= List of Kerry senior Gaelic football team captains =

This article chronologically lists players who have captained the senior Kerry county football team in the Munster Senior Football Championship and the All-Ireland Senior Football Championship. If a player captained Kerry in multiple games in a year but that captaincy was broken by an absence from the starting line up, then there will be separate entries for that player for that year.

The list is confined to players who started games as captain, it does not list players that were nominated as county captain but did not command a starting place. Unlike other counties the captain is chosen from the club that has won the Kerry Senior Football Championship.

Players indicated in bold are All-Ireland winning captains.

2022: Joe O'Connor Seán O'Shea 2021: Paul Murphy 2020: David Clifford 2019: Gavin White 2018: Shane Murphy 2017: Fionn Fitzgerald and Johnny Buckley

== List of captains ==
#	Year	Player	Club	No. of Games as Captain	All-Ireland Senior Football Championship	Munster Senior Football Championship
	2014	**Fionn Fitzgerald**	Dr. Crokes	6	All-Ireland Final winning captain	Munster Final winning captain
	2013	Colm 'Gooch' Cooper	Dr. Crokes	5	Captain, AI SF v Dublin	Munster Final winning captain
	2012	Colm 'Gooch' Cooper	Dr. Crokes	6	Captain, All-Ireland QF	
	2011	Colm 'Gooch' Cooper	Dr. Crokes	6	All-Ireland Final defeated captain	Munster Final winning captain
	2010	Bryan Sheehan	St. Mary's	5		Munster Final winning captain
	2009	**Darran O'Sullivan**	Glenbeigh-Glencar	4	All-Ireland Final winning captain	
		Donnchadh Walsh	Cromane	2	Captain, All-Ireland qualifiers v Longford and Sligo	
		Marc Ó Sé	An Ghaeltacht	1		Captain, Munster SF Replay v Cork
		Darran O'Sullivan	Glenbeigh-Glencar	1		Captain, Munster SF v Cork
	2008	ABS O Conor	An Ghaeltacht	6	All-Ireland Final defeated captain	Munster Final defeated captain
		Paul Galvin	Finuge	1		Captain, Munster SF v Clare
	2007	**Declan O'Sullivan**	Dromid Pearses	5	All-Ireland Final winning captain	Munster Final winning captain
	2006	**Declan O'Sullivan**	Dromid Pearses	1	All-Ireland Final winning captain	
		Colm 'Gooch' Cooper	Dr. Crokes	3	Captain, All-Ireland QF and SF	
		Declan O'Sullivan	Dromid Pearses	4		Munster Final defeated captain
	2005	Declan O Sullivan	Dromid Pearses	6	All-Ireland Final defeated captain	Munster Final winning captain
	2004	**Dara Ó Cinnéide**	An Ghaeltacht	5	All-Ireland Final winning captain	Munster Final winning captain
		Tomás Ó Sé	An Ghaeltacht	2		Captain, Munster QF and SF
	2003	Mike McCarthy	Kilcummin	3		Munster Final winning captain
		Declan Quill	Kerins O'Rahillys	1		Captain, Munster SF v Tipperary
	2002	Darragh Ó Sé	An Ghaeltacht	8	All-Ireland Final defeated captain	Munster Final defeated captain
		Dara Ó Cinnéide	An Ghaeltacht	1		Captain, Munster QF v Limerick
	2001	Eoin Brosnan	Dr. Crokes	1	Captain; All-Ireland Semi-Final v Meath	
		Seamus Moynihan	Glenflesk	5	Captain, All-Ireland quarter-final v Dublin	Munster Final winning captain
	2000	**Seamus Moynihan**	Glenflesk	6	All-Ireland Final winning captain	Munster Final winning captain
	1999	Johnny Crowley	Glenflesk	2		Munster Final defeated captain
		Seamus Moynihan	Glenflesk	1		Captain, Munster QF v Tipperary
	1998	Seamus Moynihan	Glenflesk	3		Munster Final winning captain
	1997	**Liam Hassett**	Laune Rangers	2	All-Ireland Final winning captain	
		Mike Hassett	Laune Rangers	1		Munster Final winning captain
		Liam Hassett	Laune Rangers	1		Captain, Munster SF v Tipperary
	1996	Billy O'Shea	Laune Rangers	4		Munster Final winning captain
	1995	Morgan Nix	Kerins O'Rahilly's	1		Munster Final defeated captain
		Anthony Gleeson	John Mitchels	1		Captain, Munster SF v Tipperary
		Darren Aherne	Austin Stacks	1		Captain, Munster QF v Tipperary
	1994	Timmy Fleming	Laune Rangers	2		Captain, Munster Championship
	1993	Seán Burke	Milltown/Castlemaine	1		Captain, Munster Championship
	1992	Connie Murphy	Dr. Crokes	3		Munster Final defeated captain
	1991	Jack O'Shea	St. Mary's	3		Munster Final winning captain;
		David Farrell	Annascaul	1		Captain; Munster QF v Limerick
	1990	Joe Shannon	Laune Rangers	2		Munster Final defeated captain
	1989	Charlie Nelligan	Castleisland Desmonds	1		Munster Final defeated captain
		Mick Galwey	Currow	1		Captain; Munster SF v Limerick
	1988	Pat Spillane	Templenoe	2		Munster Final defeated captain
	1987	Mikey Sheehy	Austin Stacks	2		Munster Final defeated captain
		Ger Power	Austin Stacks	1		Captain, Munster SF v Waterford
	1986	**Tommy Doyle**	Annascaul	3	All-Ireland Final winning captain	Munster Final winning captain
		Páidí Ó Sé	An Ghaeltacht	1		Captain, Munster SF v Tipperary
	1985	**Páidí Ó Sé**	An Ghaeltacht	5	All-Ireland Final winning captain	Munster Final winning captain
	1984	**Ambrose O'Donovan**	Gneeveguilla	3	All-Ireland Final winning captain	Munster Final winning captain
		Diarmuid O'Donoghue	Killarney Legion	1		Captain, Munster QF v Tipperary
	1983	Jack O'Shea	St. Mary's	2		Munster Final defeated captain
	1982	John Egan	Sneem	5	All-Ireland Final defeated captain	Munster Final winning captain
	1981	**Jimmy Deenihan**	Finuge	4	All-Ireland Final winning captain	Munster Final winning captain
	1980	**Ger Power**	Austin Stacks	3	All-Ireland Final winning captain	Munster Final winning captain
	1979	**Tim Kennelly**	Listowel Emmets	4	All-Ireland Final winning captain	Munster Final winning captain
	1978	**Denis 'Ogie' Moran**	Beale	4	All-Ireland Final winning captain	Munster Final winning captain
	1977	Ger O'Keeffe	Austin Stacks	3		Munster Final winning captain
	1976	John O'Keeffe	Austin Stacks	5	All-Ireland Final defeated captain	Munster Final winning captain
	1975	**Mickey 'Ned' O'Sullivan**	Kenmare	4	All-Ireland Final winning captain	Munster Final winning captain
	1974	John O'Keeffe	Austin Stacks	2		Munster Final defeated captain
	1973	Paudie O'Donoghue	Ballylongford	2		Munster Final defeated captain
	1972	Tom Prendergast	Keel	4	All-Ireland Final defeated captain	Munster Final winning captain
		Paudie Lynch	Beaufort	1		Captain, Munster SF v Tipperary
	1971	Mick Gleeson	Spa	2		Munster Final defeated captain
	1970	**Donie O'Sullivan**	Spa	4	All-Ireland Final winning captain	Munster Final winning captain
	1969	**Johnny Culloty**	Killarney Legion	4	All-Ireland Final winning captain	Munster Final winning captain
	1968	Pat Griffin	Glenbeigh-Glencar	4	All-Ireland Final defeated captain	Munster Final winning captain
	1967	Mick Morris	John Mitchels	2		Munster Final defeated captain
	1966	Donie O'Sullivan	Spa	2		Munster Final defeated captain
	1965	Jer D. O'Connor	Ballydonoghue	4	All-Ireland Final defeated captain	Munster Final winning captain
	1964	Niall Sheehy	John Mitchels	4	All-Ireland Final defeated captain	Munster Final winning captain
	1963	Niall Sheehy	John Mitchels	3		Munster Final winning captain
	1962	**Seán Óg Sheehy**	John Mitchels	4	All-Ireland Final winning captain	Munster Final winning captain
	1961	Niall Sheehy	John Mitchels	4		Munster Final winning captain
	1960	Paudie Sheehy	John Mitchels	4	All-Ireland Final defeated captain	Munster Final winning captain
	1959	**Mick O'Connell**	Young Islanders	4	All-Ireland Final winning captain	Munster Final winning captain
	1958	Mick Murphy	Kerins O'Rahilly's	3		Munster Final winning captain
	1957	Ned Fitzgerald	St. Mary's	1		Captain, Munster Championship
	1956	Jerome O'Shea	St. Mary's	3		Munster Final defeated captain
	1955	**John Dowling**	Kerins O'Rahilly's	5	All-Ireland Final winning captain	Munster Final winning captain
	1954	John Dowling	Kerins O'Rahilly's	3	All-Ireland Final defeated captain	Munster Final winning captain
	1954	Jas Murphy	Kerins O'Rahilly's	1		Captain, Munster SF v Waterford
	1953	**Jas Murphy**	Kerins O'Rahilly's	1	All-Ireland Final winning captain	
		Paudie Sheehy	John Mitchels	3		Munster Final winning captain
	1952	Tadhg Lyne	Dr. Crokes	2		Munster Final defeated captain
	1951	John Joe Sheehan	Firies	4		Munster Final winning captain
	1950	Jackie Lyne	Killarney Legion	4		Munster Final winning captain
	1949	Bill Casey	Dingle	1		Captain, Munster Championship
	1948	Joe Keohane	John Mitchels	3		Munster Final winning captain
	1947	Dinny Lyne	Killarney Legion	4	All-Ireland Final defeated captain	Munster Final winning captain
	1946	**Paddy Kennedy**	Annascaul	1	All-Ireland Final winning captain	
		Gus Cremin	Ballydonoghue	1	All-Ireland Final captain (drawn game)	
		Eddie Dowling	Ballydonoghue	2	Captain, AI SF v Antrim	Munster Final winning captain
		Bill Casey	Dingle	1		Captain, Munster SF v Clare
		Eddie Dowling	Ballydonoghue	1		Captain, Munster QF v Cork
	1945		Dingle			Munster Final defeated captain
	1944	Paddy Bawn Brosnan	Dingle	5	All-Ireland Final defeated captain	Munster Final winning captain
	1943	Johnny Walsh	Ballylongford	2		Captain, Munster Championship
	1942	Johnny Walsh	Ballylongford	1	Captain, All-Ireland SF v Galway	
	1942	Tom O'Connor	Dingle	1		Munster Final winning captain
				2		
	1941	**Bill Dillon**	Dingle	4	All-Ireland Final winning captain	Munster Final winning captain
	1940	**Dan Spring**	Kerins O'Rahilly's	5	All-Ireland Final winning captain	Munster Final winning captain
	1939	**Tom O'Connor**	Dingle	1	All-Ireland Final winning captain	
		Seán Brosnan	Dingle	2	Captain, AI SF v Mayo	
		Tom O'Connor	Dingle	1		Munster Final winning captain
	1938	Bill Kinnerk	John Mitchels		All-Ireland Final defeated captain	Munster Final winning captain
	1937	**Miko Doyle**	Austin Stack's	7	All-Ireland Final winning captain	Munster Final winning captain
	1936	Dan O'Keeffe	Kerins O'Rahilly's	4		Munster Final winning captain
	1935	n/a				Kerry did not compete
	1934	Dan O'Keeffe	Kerins O'Rahilly's	4		Munster Final winning captain
	1933	Miko Doyle	Austin Stack's	2		Munster Final winning captain
	1932	**Joe Barrett**	Austin Stack's		All-Ireland Final winning captain	
		Miko Doyle	Austin Stack's			Munster Final winning captain
	1931	**Con Brosnan**	Moyvane		All-Ireland Final winning captain	Munster Final winning captain
	1930	**John Joe Sheehy**	John Mitchels		All-Ireland Final winning captain	Munster Final winning captain
	1929	**Joe Barrett**	Austin Stack's		All-Ireland Final winning captain	Munster Final winning captain
	1928	John Joe Sheehy	Tralee Mitchels			Captain, Munster Championship
	1927	John Joe Sheehy	Tralee Mitchels		All-Ireland Final defeated captain	
		Joe Barrett	Tralee Mitchels			Munster Final winning captain
	1926	**John Joe Sheehy**	Tralee Mitchels		All-Ireland Final winning captain	Munster Final winning captain
	1925	unknown				Munster Final winning captain
		Phil O'Sullivan	Tuosist			Captain, All-Ireland semi-final v Cavan
	1924	**Phil O'Sullivan**	Tuosist		All-Ireland Final winning captain	Munster Final winning captain
	1923	Phil O'Sullivan	Tuosist		All-Ireland Final defeated captain	
		John O'Mahony	Dr. Crokes			Munster Final winning captain
	1922	n/a				Kerry did not compete
	1921	n/a				Kerry did not compete
	1920	Martin Carroll	Tralee Mitchels			Munster Final defeated captain
	1919	Con Clifford	Tralee Mitchels	5		Munster Final winning captain
	1918	Con Murphy	Dr. Crokes			Munster Final defeated captain
	1917	n/a				Kerry did not compete
	1916	Denis Doyle	Dr. Crokes			Captain, Munster Championship
	1915	Dick Fitzgerald	Dr. Crokes	4	All-Ireland Final defeated captain	Munster Final winning captain
	1914	**Dick Fitzgerald**	Dr. Crokes	6	All-Ireland Final winning captain	Munster Final winning captain
	1913	**Dick Fitzgerald**	Dr. Crokes	6	All-Ireland Final winning captain	Munster Final winning captain
	1912	Patrick J. Cahill	Tralee Mitchels	1	Captain, All-Ireland SF v Antrim	
		Dick Fitzgerald	Dr. Crokes	2		Munster Final winning captain
	1911	Jack Lawlor	Tralee Mitchels	2		Captain, Munster Championship
	1910	Con Healy	Tralee Mitchels			Munster Final winning captain
	1909	**Tom Costello**	Tralee Mitchels	6	All-Ireland Final winning captain	Munster Final winning captain
	1908	John Thomas Fitzgerald	Tralee Mitchels	2	All-Ireland Final defeated captain	
		Con Healy	Tralee Mitchels			Munster Final winning captain
	1907	Maurice McCarthy	Tralee Mitchels			Captain, Munster Championship
	1906	Maurice McCarthy	Tralee Mitchels			Munster Final defeated captain
	1905	Maurice McCarthy	Tralee Mitchels		All-Ireland Final defeated captain	Munster Final winning captain
	1904	**Austin Stack**	Tralee Mitchels	1	All-Ireland Final winning captain	
		Thady O'Gorman	Tralee Mitchels	4		Munster Final winning captain
6	1903	**Thady O'Gorman**	Tralee Mitchels	7	All-Ireland Final winning captain	Munster Final winning captain
7		Eugene O'Sullivan	Dr. Crokes	1		Captain, Munster QF v Waterford
7	1902	Eugene O'Sullivan	Dr. Crokes	3		Munster Final defeated captain
6		Thady O'Gorman	Tralee Mitchels	1		Captain, Munster QF v Cork
5	1901	Tom Looney	Dr. Crokes	2		Captain, Munster Championship
4	1900	Ned Sheehan	Laune Rangers	2		Munster Final defeated captain
	1899	n/a				Kerry did not compete
	1898	n/a				Kerry did not compete
	1897	n/a				Kerry did not compete
	1896	n/a				Kerry did not compete
3	1895	Jeremiah Clifford	Ballymacelligott	1		Captain, Munster Championship
	1894	Paddy O'Regan	Laune Rangers	1		Captain, Munster Championship
	1893	n/a				Kerry did not compete
1	1892	J.P O'Sullivan	Laune Rangers	3	All-Ireland Final defeated captain	Munster Final winning captain
2	1891	John O'Neill	Ballymacelligott	1		Captain, Munster Championship
1	1890	J.P O'Sullivan	Laune Rangers	3		Munster Final defeated captain
1	1889	J.P O'Sullivan	Laune Rangers	1		Captain, Munster Championship
