= List of All-Ireland Senior Football Championship winning captains =

This is a list of players who have captained a winning team to the All-Ireland Senior Football Championship, the premier competition in Gaelic football. The All-Ireland Senior Football Championship is an annual series of games usually played in Ireland during the summer and early autumn, and organised by the Gaelic Athletic Association (GAA). Contested by the top inter-county football teams in Ireland, the tournament has taken place every year since 1887—except in 1888, when the competition was not played due to a tour of the United States by would-be competitors.

== List of winning captains ==
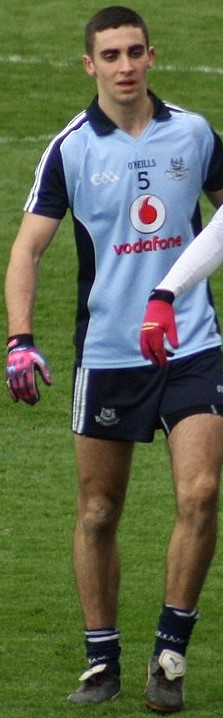
James McCarthy captained Dublin to the title in 2023.

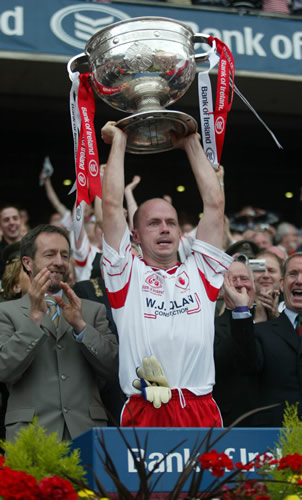
Peter Canavan, lifting the Sam Maguire Cup, captained Tyrone to the first title in team history in 2003.

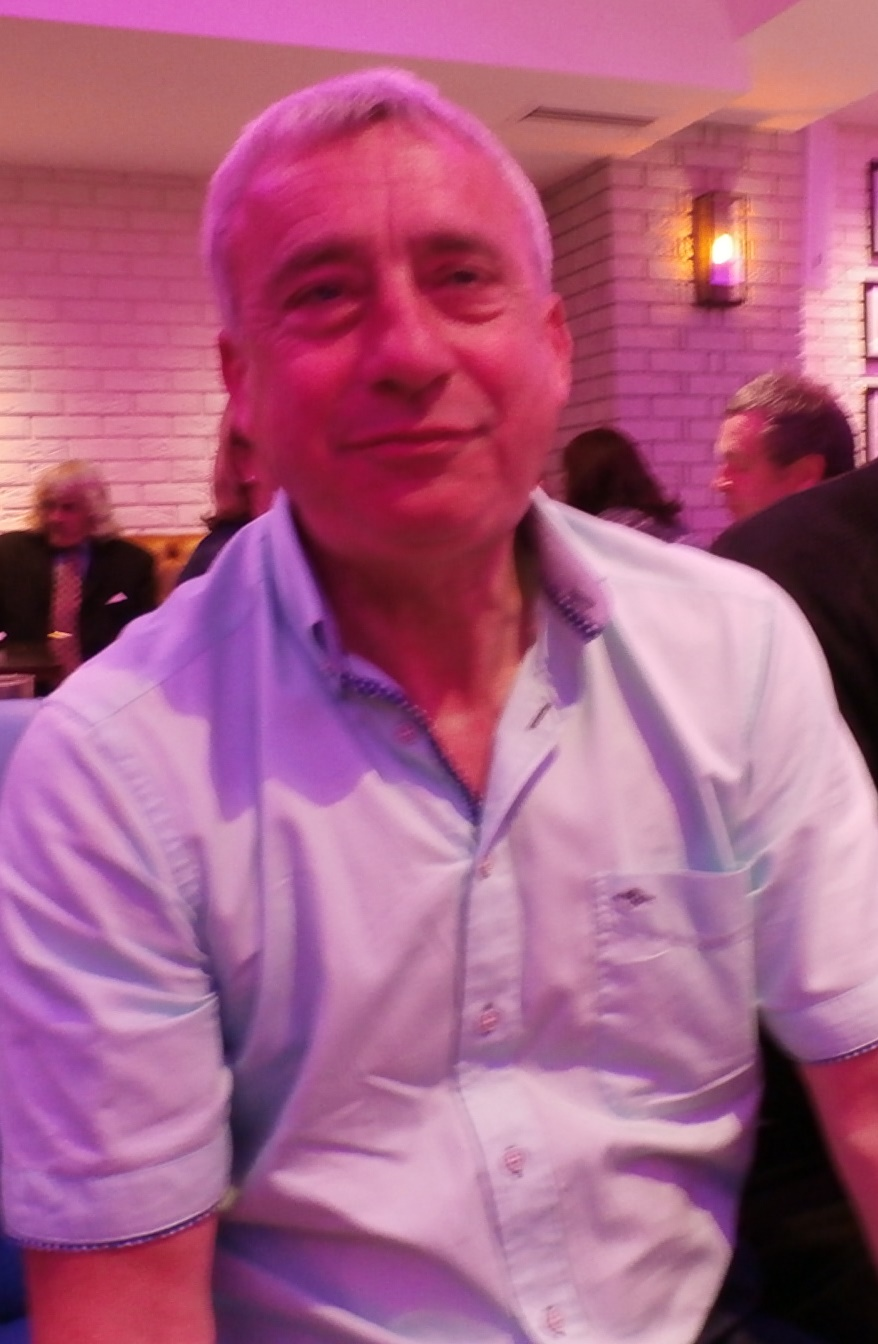
Denis Moran captained Kerry to the title in 1978.

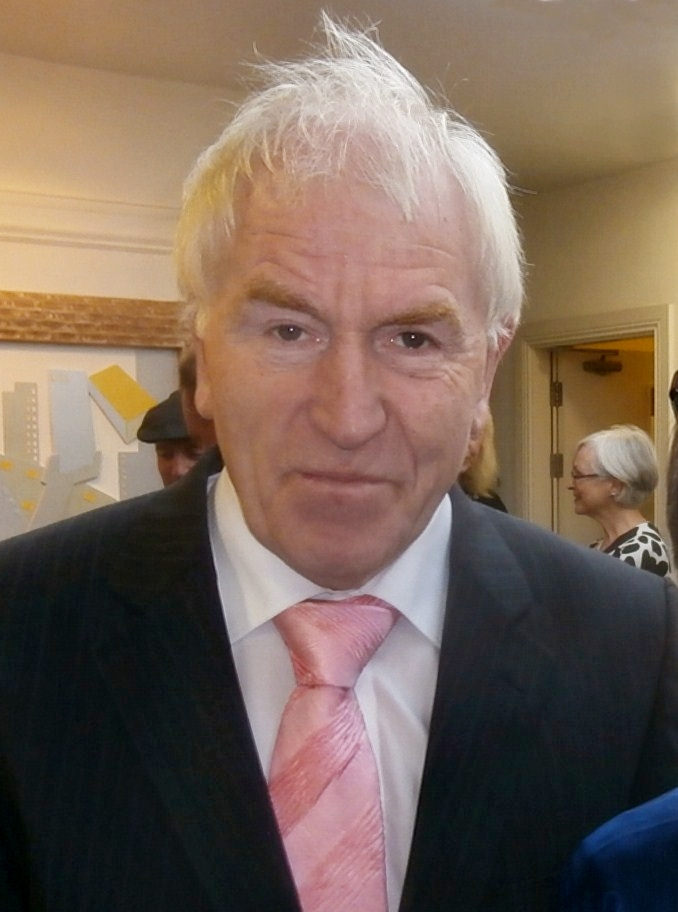
Jimmy Deenihan captained Kerry to the title in 1981.

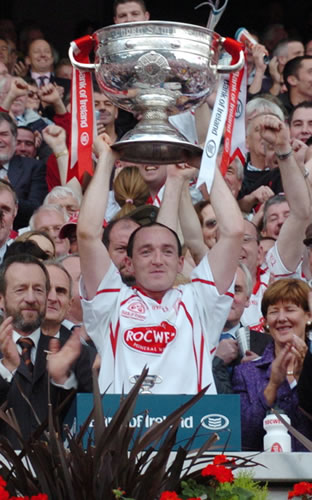
Brian Dooher, seen here lifting the Sam Maguire Cup for Tyrone in 2005, also captained his team to the 2008 title; included in the background are Seán Kelly, Martin McAleese, Bertie Ahern and Mary McAleese.

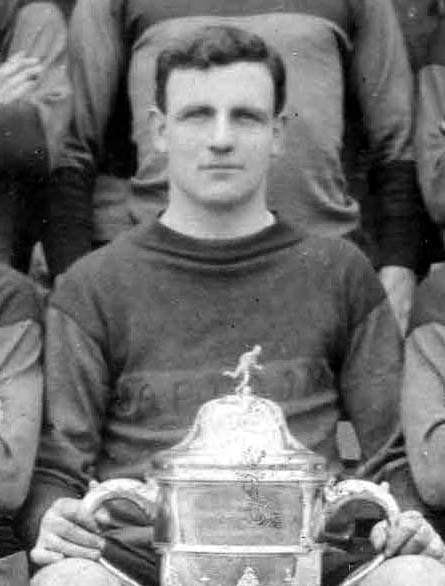
Seán O'Kennedy captained Wexford to several titles in the 1910s.

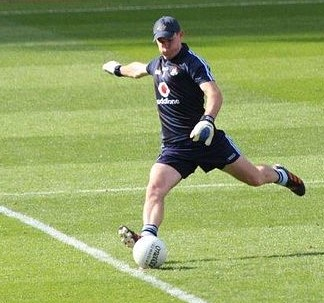
Stephen Cluxton holds the record for most titles won as captain (7). Six were won consecutively (2015–2020).

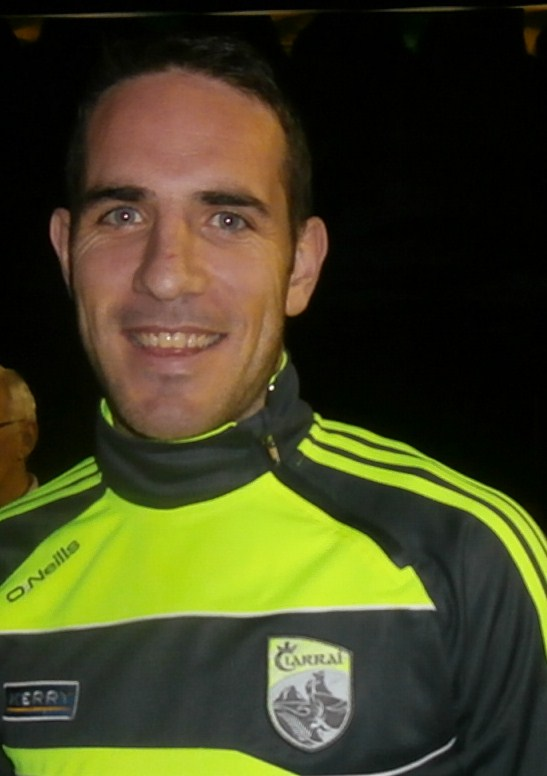
Declan O'Sullivan captained Kerry to consecutive titles in 2006 and 2007.

Year	Player	Team	Club	Sources
1887	Dennis Corbett	Limerick	Commercials	
1888	Competition not completed			
1889	Gil Cavanagh	Tipperary	Bohercrowe	
1890	Jim Power	Cork	Midleton	
1891	John Kennedy	Dublin	Young Irelands	
1892	John Kennedy	Dublin	Young Irelands	
1893	Tom Hayes	Wexford	Young Irelands	
1894	John Kennedy	Dublin	Young Irelands	
1895	Paddy Finn	Tipperary	Arravale Rovers	
1896	Con Fitzgerald	Limerick	Commercials	
1897	P. J. Walsh	Dublin	Kickhams	
1898	Matt Rea	Dublin	Geraldines	
1899	Matt Rea	Dublin	Geraldines	
1900	Jack Tobin	Tipperary	Clonmel Shamrocks	
1901	Jack Darcy	Dublin	Isle of the Sea	
1902	Jack Dempsey	Dublin	Bray Emmets	
1903	Thady Gorman	Kerry	Tralee Mitchels	
1904	Austin Stack	Kerry	Tralee Mitchels	
1905	Jack Murray	Kildare	Roseberry	
1906	Jack Grace	Dublin	Kickhams	
1907	Jack Grace	Dublin	Kickhams	
1908	Dave Kelleher	Dublin	Geraldines	
1909	Tom Costelloe	Kerry	Tralee Mitchels	
1910	Larry McCormack	Louth		
1911	Mick Mehigan	Cork	Lees	
1912	Jim Smith	Louth		
1913	Dick Fitzgerald	Kerry	Dr Crokes	
1914	Dick Fitzgerald	Kerry	Dr Crokes	
1915	Seán O'Kennedy	Wexford	New Ross	
1916	Seán O'Kennedy	Wexford	New Ross	
1917	Seán O'Kennedy	Wexford	New Ross	
1918	Tom McGrath	Wexford		
1919	Larry Stanley	Kildare	Caragh	
1920	Jerry Shelly	Tipperary	Fethard	
1921	Eddie Carroll	Dublin	St Mary's	
1922	Paddy Carey	Dublin	O'Tooles	
1923	Paddy McDonnell	Dublin		
1924	Phil O'Sullivan	Kerry	Kenmare	
1925	Michael Walsh	Galway	St Grellan's, Ballinasloe	
1926	John Joe Sheehy	Kerry	John Mitchels	
1927	Mick Buckley	Kildare	Caragh	
1928	Bill Gannon	Kildare	Kildare	
1929	Joe Barrett	Kerry	Austin Stack's	
1930	John Joe Sheehy	Kerry	John Mitchels	
1931	Con Brosnan	Kerry	Moyvane	
1932	Joe Barrett	Kerry	Austin Stack's	
1933	Jim Smith	Cavan	Killinkere	
1934	Michael Higgins	Galway		
1935	Hughie O'Reilly	Caavan	Cootehill	
1936	Séamus O'Malley	Mayo	Claremorris	
1937	Miko Doyle	Kerry	Austin Stack's	
1938	John Dunne	Galway	St Grellan's, Ballinasloe	
1939	Tom Gega O'Connor	Kerry	Dingle	
1940	Dan Spring	Kerry	Kerin's O'Rahilly's	
1941	Bill Dillon	Kerry	Dingle	
1942	Joe Fitzgerald	Dublin	Geraldines	
1943	Jimmy Murray	Roscommon	St Patrick's	
1944	Jimmy Murray	Roscommon	St Patrick's	
1945	Tadhgo Crowley	Cork	Clonakilty	
1946	Paddy Kennedy	Kerry	Geraldines	
1947	John Joe O'Reilly	Cava	Cornafean	
1948	John Joe O'Reilly	Cavan	Cornafean	
1949	Brian Smyth	Meath	Dunboyne	
1950	Seán Flanagan	Mayo	Ballaghadereen	
1951	Seán Flanagan	Mayo	Ballaghadereen	
1952	Mick Higgins	Cavan	Mountnugent	
1953	Jas Murphy	Kerry	Kerins O'Rahilly's	
1954	Peter McDermott	Meath	Navan O'Mahony's	
1955	John Dowling	Kerry	Kerin's O'Rahilly's	
1956	Jack Mangan	Galway	Tuam Stars	
1957	Dermot O'Brien	Louth	St Mary's, Ardee	
1958	Kevin Heffernan	Dublin	St Vincent’s	
1959	Mick O'Connell	Kerry	Young Islanders	
1960	Kevin Mussen	Down	Clonduff	
1961	Paddy Doherty	Down	Ballykinlar	
1962	Seán Óg Sheehy	Kerry	John Mitchels	
1963	Des Foley	Dublin	St Vincent’s	
1964	John Donnellan	Galway	Dunmore McHales	
1965	Enda Colleran	Galway	Mountbellew/Moylough	
1966	Enda Colleran	Galway	Mountbellew/Moylough	
1967	Peter Darby	Meath	Trim	
1968	Joe Lennon	Down	Aghaderg	
1969	Johnny Culloty	Kerry	Killarney Legion	
1970	Donie O'Sullivan	Kerry	Spa	
1971	Willie Bryan	Offaly	Walsh Island	
1972	Tony McTague	Offaly	Ferbane	
1973	Billy Morgan	Cork	Nemo Rangers	
1974	Seán Doherty	Dublin	Ballyboden St Enda's	
1975	Mickey O'Sullivan	Kerry	Kenmare	
1976	Tony Hanahoe	Dublin	St Vincent's	
1977	Tony Hanahoe	Dublin	St Vincent's	
1978	Denis ‘Ogie’ Moran	Kerry	Beale	
1979	Tim Kennelly	Kerry	Listowel Emmets	
1980	Ger Power	Kerry	Austin Stacks	
1981	Jimmy Deenihan	Kerry	Finuge	
1982	Richie Connor	Offaly	Walsh Island	
1983	Tommy Drumm	Dublin	Whitehall Colmcille	
1984	Ambrose O'Donovan	Kerry	Gneeveguilla	
1985	Páidí Ó Sé	Kerry	An Ghaeltacht	
1986	Tommy Doyle	Kerry	Annascaul	
1987	Mick Lyons	Meath	Summerhill	
1988	Joe Cassells	Meath	Navan O'Mahony's	
1989	Dinny Allen	Cork	Nemo Rangers	
1990	Larry Tompkins	Cork	Castlehaven	
1991	Paddy O'Rourke	Down	Burren	
1992	Anthony Molloy	Donegal	Ardara	
1993	Henry Downey	Derry	Erin's Own Lavey	
1994	D. J. Kane	Down	Newry Mitchels	
1995	John O'Leary	Dublin	O'Dwyers	
1996	Tommy Dowd	Meath	Dunderry	
1997	Liam Hassett	Kerry	Laune Rangers	
1998	Ray Silke	Galway	Corofin	
1999	Graham Geraghty	Meath	Seneschalstown	
2000	Seamus Moynihan	Kerry	Glenflesk	
2001	Gary Fahey	Galway	Killanin	
2002	Kieran McGeeney	Armagh	Na Fianna	
2003	Peter Canavan	Tyrone	Errigal Ciarán	
2004	Dara Ó Cinnéide	Kerry	An Ghaeltacht	
2005	Brian Dooher	Tyrone	Clann na nGael	
2006	Declan O'Sullivan	Kerry	Dromid Pearses	
2007	Declan O'Sullivan	Kerry	Dromid Pearses	
2008	Brian Dooher	Tyrone	Clann na nGael	
2009	Darran O'Sullivan	Kerry	Glenbeigh-Glencar	
2010	Graham Canty	Cork	Bantry Blues	
2011	Bryan Cullen	Dublin	Skerries Harps	
2012	Michael Murphy	Donegal	Glenswilly	
2013	Stephen Cluxton	Dublin	Parnells	
2014	Fionn Fitzgerald	Kerry	Dr Crokes	
2015	Stephen Cluxton	Dublin	Parnells	
2016	Stephen Cluxton	Dublin	Parnells	
2017	Stephen Cluxton	Dublin	Parnells	
2018	Stephen Cluxton	Dublin	Parnells	
2019	Stephen Cluxton	Dublin	Parnells	
2020	Stephen Cluxton	Dublin	Parnells	
2021	Pádraig Hampsey	Tyrone	Coalisland	
2022	Seán O'Shea; Joe O'Connor	Kerry	Kenmare Shamrocks; Austin Stacks	
2023	James McCarthy	Dublin		
2024	Aidan Forker	Armagh		
2025	Gavin White	Kerry	Dr Crokes	
2026	Jack Coyne	Mayo	Ballyhaunis	

== List of players who have captained their team to All-Ireland success on more than one occasion ==
A select number of players have captained their team to All-Ireland success on more than one occasion.

Player	Team	Club	Years
John Kennedy	Dublin (1)	Young Irelands	1891, 1892, 1894
Matt Rea	Dublin (2)	Geraldines	1898, 1899
Jack Grace	Dublin (3)	Kickhams	1906, 1907
Dick Fitzgerald	Kerry (1)	Dr Crokes	1913, 1914
Seán O'Kennedy	Wexford	New Ross	1915, 1916, 1917
John Joe Sheehy	Kerry (2)	John Mitchels	1926, 1930
Joe Barrett	Kerry (3)	Austin Stack's	1929, 1932
Jimmy Murray	Roscommon	St Patrick's	1943, 1944
John Joe O'Reilly	Cavan	Cornafean	1947, 1948
Seán Flanagan	Mayo	Ballaghadereen	1950, 1951
Enda Colleran	Galway	Mountbellew/Moylough	1965, 1966
Tony Hanahoe	Dublin (4)	St Vincent's	1976, 1977
Brian Dooher	Tyrone	Clann na nGael	2005, 2008
Declan O'Sullivan	Kerry (4)	Dromid Pearses	2006, 2007
Stephen Cluxton	Dublin (5)	Parnells	2013, 2015, 2016, 2017, 2018, 2019, 2020

== See also ==
- Sam Maguire Cup
- List of All-Ireland Senior Hurling Championship winning captains
