= All-Ireland Senior Football Championship Final referees =

Sporting officials

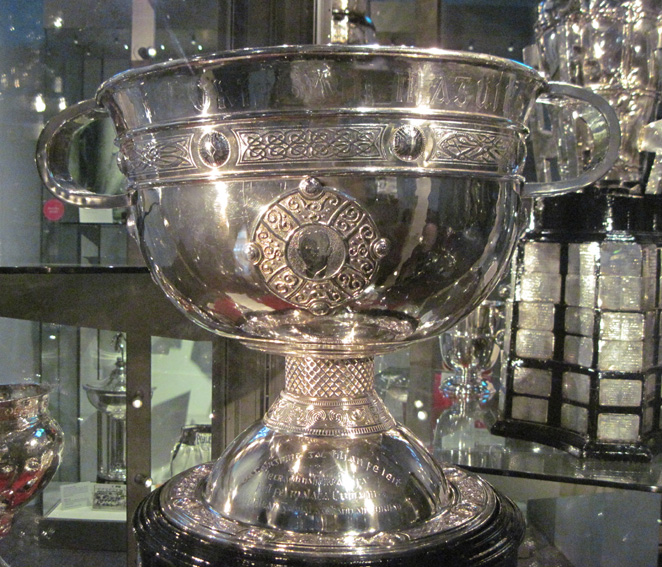
The Sam Maguire Cup

In Gaelic football, the All-Ireland Senior Football Championship Final, the deciding match of the All-Ireland Senior Football Championship competition, is considered the highest honour for referees to be appointed to officiate.

The most recent final (2024) was refereed by Sean Hurson, with Brendan Cawley on standby; Paddy Neilan as linesman; Derek O'Mahoney on sideline; and two umpires from Ardboe and one each from Clonoe and Coalisland. The 2022 All-Ireland Senior Football Championship final was also refereed by Hurson, with Neilan on standby; Barry Cassidy as linesman; Sean Laverty on sideline; and two umpires from Ardboe and one each from Clonoe and Moortown. The 2021 All-Ireland Senior Football Championship final was refereed by Joe McQuillan, with David Gough on standby; Brendan Cawley as linesman; Ciaran Brannigan on sideline; and two umpires from Kill Shamrocks and one each from Drumalee and Killygarry. The 2019 All-Ireland Senior Football Championship final was refereed by David Gough, with Conor Lane on standby; Barry Cassidy as linesman.

== Selection ==
According to The Irish Times, the referee is often "centre stage" during All-Ireland SFC finals.

Men who referee a final that ends in a draw cannot also referee the replay. This rule was highlighted in 2019, when David Gough — thought by consensus to have had a good game — was replaced by Conor Lane for the replay. Colm O'Rourke in the Sunday Independent column, "The GAA's view that the referee of a drawn game cannot take the replay defies common sense and logic. Why disqualify a referee when he has done a good job? If the referee is not up to it then certainly he should be left off, but when there is almost universal agreement that he is the best referee in the country then give him all the big games and replays too. The players want the best referees".

Brian White was the first to benefit from the rule change when he got to referee the 2000 replay.

Referees are chosen by the Gaelic Athletic Association (GAA) for their impartiality and their assessed performance scores over that championship season. A clue to the identity of the final referee may be found among those chosen to referee All-Ireland quarter-finals. In recent years, a referee who has overseen an All-Ireland SFC semi-final is never chosen for the final. However, he has tended to have refereed a quarter-final.

A referee who has officiated at one of the semi-finals is traditionally overlooked when deciding the referee for the same year's final. The referee is expected to be under 50 years of age.

When the decision is made, the identity of the referee chosen is revealed following the All-Ireland SFC semi-finals and ahead of the final. A period of media attention may ensue, sometimes even before the announcement has been made.

== Traditions ==
On the day, the referee is introduced to the President of Ireland ahead of the game.

The All-Ireland final referee gives the match ball to the captain of the winning team at the end of the game.

The referee receives a Celtic cross for each final he officiates. The referee may also be presented with a match ball, such as Martin McNally was in 2026.

== Referees ==
=== Pre-1928 ===
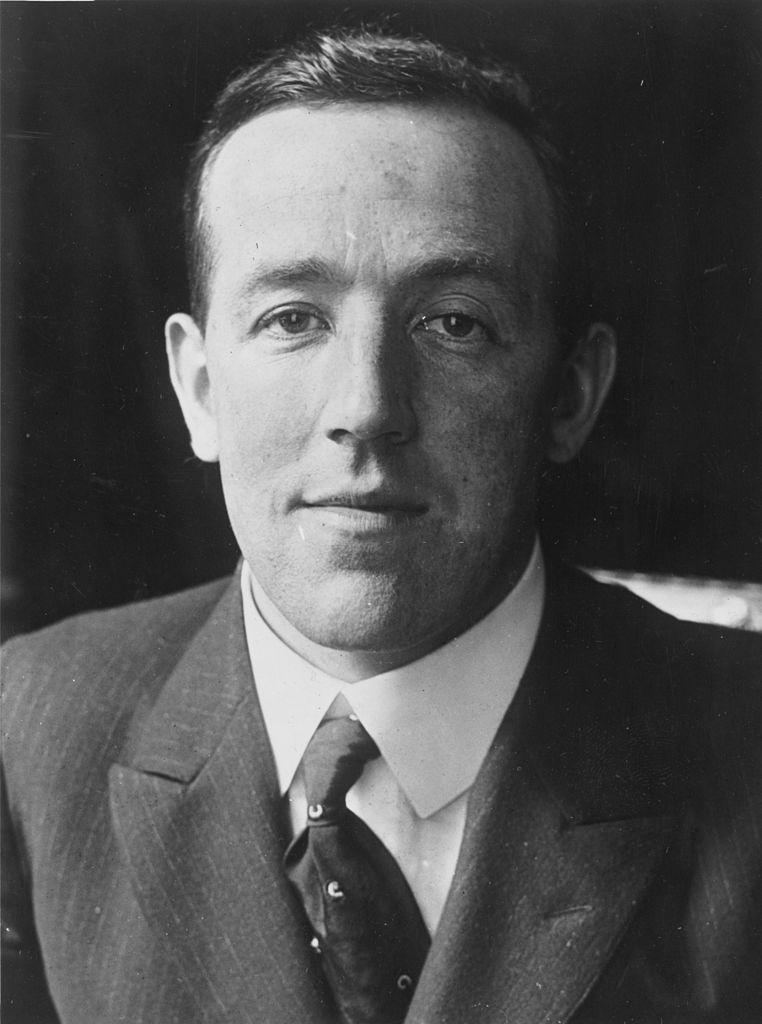
Harry Boland, 1914 referee

Year	Referee	Co.	Referee's club	Ref(s)
1887	John Cullinane	Tipperary		
1889	T. O'Driscoll			
1890	J. J. Kenny	Dublin		
1891	T. J. Whelan	Laois		
1892	Dan Fraher	Waterford		
1893	T. Gilligan	Dublin		
1894 (1st/2nd?)	R. T. Blake (Dick Blake)	Meath		
1895	J. J. Kenny	Dublin		
1896	Thomas Dooley	Cork		
1897	Spencer Lyons	Limerick		
1898	John McCarthy	Kilkenny		
1899	L. Stanley	Louth		
1900	T. H. Redmond			
1901	John McCarthy	Kilkenny		
1902	Thomas F. O'Sullivan	Kerry		
1903	John McCarthy	Kilkenny		
1904	John Fitzgerald	Cork		
1905	M. F. Crowe	Dublin		
1906	John Fitzgerald	Kildare	Roseberry	
1907	John Fitzgerald	Kildare	Roseberry	
1908	M Conroy	Dublin		
1909	M. F. Crowe	Dublin		
1910	w/o /scr.			
1911	M. O'Brennan	Roscommon		
1912	Tom Irwin			
1913	M. F. Crowe	Dublin		
1914 (1st/2nd)	Harry Boland	Dublin		
1915	Pat Dunphy	Laois		
1916	Pat Dunphy	Laois		
1917	Pat Dunphy	Laois		
1918	Pat Dunphy	Laois		
1919	Pat Dunphy	Laois		
1920	Willie Walsh	Waterford		
1921	Willie Walsh	Waterford		
1922	Pat Dunphy	Laois		
1923	James Byrne	Wexford		
1924	T. Shevlin	Roscommon		
1925	?			
1926	T. Shevlin	Roscommon		
1927	T. Shevlin	Roscommon		

=== 1928 to 1969: Introduction of the Sam Maguire Cup ===
Year	Referee	Co.	Referee's club	Ref(s)
1928	Tom Burke	Louth		
1929	Tom Burke	Louth		
1930	Jim Byrne	Wexford		
1931	T. Keating	Tipp		
1932	Martin O'Neill	Wexford		
1933	Martin O'Neill	Wexford		
1934	Sean McCarthy	Kerry		
1935	Stephen Jordan	Galway		
1936	Sean McCarthy	Kerry		
1937 (1st/2nd)	M. Hennessy	Clare		
1938 (1st)	P. Maguire	Cavan		
1938 (2nd)	Peter Waters	Kildare	Raheens	
1939	J. Flaherty	Offaly		
1940	Seamus Burke	Kildare		
1941	Patrick McKenna	Limerick		
1942	Sean Kennedy	Donegal		
1943 (1st)	Patrick McKenna	Limerick		
1943 (2nd)	P O Miotain	Wexford		
1944	Paddy Mythen	Wexford		
1945	John Dunne	Galway		
1946 (1st)	Bill Delaney	Laois		
1946 (2nd)	Paddy Mythen	Wexford		
1947	M. O'Neill	Wexford		
1948	M. J. Flaherty	Offaly		
1949	D. Ryan	Kerry	Austin Stacks, Tralee	
1950	Simon Deignan	Cavan		
1951	Bill Delaney	Laois		
1952 (1st/2nd)	Sean Hayes	Tipperary		
1953	Peter McDermott	Meath		
1954	Simon Deignan	Cavan		
1955	Willie Goodison	Wexford		
1956	Peter McDermott	Meath		
1957	Patsy Geraghty	Galway		
1958	Simon Deignan	Cavan		
1959	John Dowling	Offaly		
1960	John Dowling	Offaly		
1961	L. Maguire	Cavan		
1962	Eamonn Moules	Wicklow		
1963	Eamonn Moules	Wicklow		
1964	Jimmy Hatton	Wicklow		
1965	Mick Loftus	Mayo		
1966	Jimmy Hatton	Wicklow		
1967	John Moloney	Tipp		
1968	Mick Loftus	Mayo		
1969	John Moloney	Tipp		

=== 1970 to 2000 ===
Year	Referee	Co.	Referee's club	Ref(s)
1970	P. Kelly	Dublin		
1971	P. Kelly	Dublin		
1972 (1st)	Fintan Tierney	Cavan; originally from Longford	Butlersbridge	
1972 (2nd)	Paddy Devlin	Tyrone		
1973	John Moloney	Tipp		
1974	Paddy Devlin	Tyrone		
1975	John Moloney	Tipp		
1976	Paddy Collins	Westmeath		
1977	John Moloney	Tipp		
1978	Seamus Aldridge	Kildare	Round Towers	
1979	Hugh Duggan	Armagh		
1980	Seamus Murray	Monaghan		
1981	Paddy Collins	Westmeath		
1982	P. J. McGrath	Mayo	Kilmaine	
1983	John Gough	Antrim		
1984	Paddy Collins	Westmeath		
1985	Paddy Kavanagh	Meath		
1986	Jimmy Dennigan	Cork		
1987	Pat Lane	Limerick	St Senan's	
1988 (1st/2nd)	Tommy Sugrue	Kerry		
1989	Paddy Collins	Westmeath		
1990	Paddy Russell	Tipp		
1991	Séamus Prior	Leitrim	Aughnasheelin	
1992	Tommy Sugrue	Kerry		
1993	Tommy Howard	Kildare		
1994	Tommy Sugrue	Kerry		

Year	Referee	Co.	Referee's club	Standby referee	Other linesman	Sideline official	Ref(s)
1995	Paddy Russell	Tipp					
1996 (1st/2nd)	Pat McEnaney	Monaghan	Corduff		Paddy Russell		
1997	Brian White	Wexford	Cushinstown				
1998	John Bannon	Longford	Legan Sarsfields				
1999	Mick Curley	Galway					
2000 (1st)	Pat McEnaney	Monaghan	Corduff				
2000 (2nd)	Brian White	Wexford	Cushinstown				

=== 2001 to 2024 ===
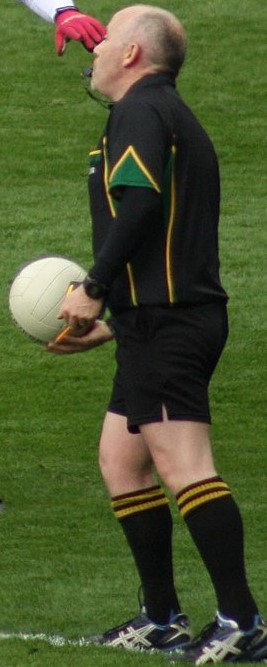
Marty Duffy, 2009 referee

Year	Referee	Co.	Referee's club	Standby referee	Other linesman	Sideline official	Ref(s)
2001	Michael Collins	Cork	Clonakilty				
2002	John Bannon	Longford	Legan Sarsfields				
2003	Brian White	Wexford	Cushinstown				
2004	Pat McEnaney	Monaghan	Corduff				
2005	Michael Monahan	Kildare	Raheens				
2006	Brian Crowe	Cavan	Cavan Gaels				
2007	David Coldrick	Meath	Blackhall Gaels				
2008	Maurice Deegan	Laois	Stradbally				
2009	Marty Duffy	Sligo	Kilgass				
2010	David Coldrick	Meath	Blackhall Gaels	Gearoid O Conamha	Maurice Deegan	Syl Doyle	
2011	Joe McQuillan	Cavan	Kill Shamrocks	David Coldrick	Pat McEnaney	Maurice Condon	
2012	Maurice Deegan	Laois	Stradbally				
2013	Joe McQuillan	Cavan	Kill Shamrocks	Cormac Reilly	Padraig O'Sullivan	Michael Duffy	
2014	Eddie Kinsella	Laois	Courtwood	Marty Duffy	Pádraig Hughes	Rory Hickey	
2015	David Coldrick	Meath	Blackhall Gaels	Joe McQuillan	Conor Lane	Derek Fahy	
2016 (1st)	Conor Lane	Cork	Banteer			Maurice Deegan	
2016 (2nd)	Maurice Deegan	Laois	Stradbally	David Coldrick/Sean Hurson	David Coldrick/Sean Hurson		
2017	Joe McQuillan	Cavan	Kill Shamrocks	Conor Lane	Padraig O'Sullivan	Niall Cullen	
2018	Conor Lane	Cork	Banteer				
2019 (1st)	David Gough	Meath	Slane	Conor Lane	Barry Cassidy	Sean Hurson	
2019 (2nd)	Conor Lane	Cork	Banteer				
2020	David Coldrick	Meath	Blackhall Gaels				
2021	Joe McQuillan	Cavan	Kill Shamrocks	David Gough	Brendan Cawley	Ciaran Brannigan	
2022	Sean Hurson	Tyrone	Galbally Parses	Paddy Neilan	Barry Cassidy	Sean Laverty	
2023	David Gough	Meath	Slane	Martin McNally	James Molloy	Fergal Kelly	
2024	Sean Hurson	Tyrone	Galbally Parses	Brendan Cawley	Paddy Neilan	Derek O'Mahoney	

=== 2025 to present ===
Year	Referee	Co.	Referee's club	Standby referee	Other linesman	Sideline official	Hawk-Eye Official	Time Official	Ref(s)
2025	Brendan Cawley	Kildare	Sarsfields	Martin McNally	David Coldrick	Thomas Murphy	Garreth Whelan	Seán Laverty	
2026	Martin McNally	Monaghan	Corduff	Sean Hurson	Thomas Murphy	Sean Lonergan	Killan Jones	Marty Duffy	

== Referees with more than one final ==
Bold = referee still active at inter-county level

Referee	Number of finals	Years
Pat Dunphy	6	1915, 1916, 1917, 1918, 1919, 1922
John Moloney	5	1967, 1969, 1973, 1975, 1977
T. Shevlin	4	1924, 1926 (draw), 1926 (replay), 1927
Paddy Collins	4	1976, 1981, 1984, 1989
Tommy Sugrue	4	1988 (draw), 1988 (replay) 1992, 1994
Pat McEnaney	4	1996 (draw), 1996 (replay), 2000 (draw), 2004
David Coldrick	4	2007, 2010, 2015, 2020
Joe McQuillan	4	2011, 2013, 2017, 2021
Paddy Mythen	3	1943 (replay), 1944, 1946 (replay)
John McCarthy	3	1898, 1901, 1903
M. F. Crowe	3	1905, 1909, 1913
Brian White	3	1997, 2000 (replay), 2003
Maurice Deegan	3	2008, 2012, 2016 (replay)
**Conor Lane**	3	2016 (draw), 2018, 2019 (replay)
Simon Deignan	3	1950, 1954, 1958
J. J. Kenny	2	1890, 1895
R. T. Blake	2	1894 (1st), 1894 (replay)
John Fitzgerald	2	1906, 1907, a man by the same name done the 1904 final but it says Cork and not Kildare?
Harry Boland	2	1914 (draw), 1914 (replay)
Willie Walsh	2	1920, 1921
Tom Burke	2	1928, 1929
Martin O'Neill	2	1932, 1933
Sean McCarthy	2	1934, 1936
M. Hennessy	2	1937 (draw), 1937 (replay)
P. Maguire	2	1938 (draw), 1938 (replay)
Patrick McKenna	2	1941, 1943 (draw)
Sean Hayes	2	1952 (draw), 1952 (replay)
John Dowling	2	1959, 1960
Eamonn Moules	2	1962, 1963
Mick Loftus	2	1965, 1968
P. Kelly	2	1970, 1971
Paddy Russell	2	1990, 1995
John Bannon	2	1998, 2002
**David Gough**	2	2019 (draw), 2023
**Sean Hurson**	2	2022, 2024

- James Byrne did 1923, a Jim Byrne did 1930?
- J Flaherty (Offaly) did 1939, then an MJ Flaherty (Offaly) did 1948?
- Pat Dunphy (1922) has the distinction of also taking charge of the 1922 All-Ireland Senior Hurling Championship final in the same year.
- John Dowling (1960) has the distinction of also taking charge of the 1960 All-Ireland Senior Hurling Championship final in the same year.
- Jimmy Hatton (1966) has the distinction of also taking charge of the 1966 All-Ireland Senior Hurling Championship final in the same year.

== See also ==
- FA Cup Final referees, the closest the English have
