= 1941 All-Ireland Senior Football Championship final =

- Event: 1941 All-Ireland Senior Football Championship
Kerry	Galway
1–8 (11)	0–7 (7)
- Date: 7 September 1941
- Venue: Croke Park, Dublin
- Referee: Patrick McKenna (Limerick)
- Attendance: 45,512

The 1941 All-Ireland Senior Football Championship final was the 54th All-Ireland Final and the deciding match of the 1941 All-Ireland Senior Football Championship, an inter-county Gaelic football tournament for the top teams in Ireland.

== Paths to the final ==
Kerry required a replay to defeat Dublin in the All-Ireland SFC semi-final. The first game was held at Croke Park on 10 August; the replay in Tralee the following Sunday, 17 August. This was the last All-Ireland SFC semi-final replay played outside Croke Park until 1983, when Dublin contested a semi-final replay against Cork at Páirc Uí Chaoimh.

P. D. Mehigan (or "Pat'O") wrote of the first game: "At the very last minute Murt Kelly drove high at the Dublin posts and the ball glanced off the upright for the balancing point. Dublin had played the better football but both sets of forwards shot wildly when well placed. As I anticipated here last week, it was a low-scoring game and without a goal, and the backs had far the better of the argument throughout. Keohane, Myers, Casey and Dillon shone in Kerry's defence whilst Kennedy, Falvey, Murphy and Quinn played steady football for Dublin".

20,000 people attended the replay; half of Dublin's team spent the night before in Limerick and landed late after a trip on a wartime turf-trains. Pat'O recorded Dublin as being "outclassed" by a scoreline of 2–9 to 0–3. When Tom O'Connor scored a goal in the twentieth minute, it was — he wrote — "the beginning of the end".

Dublin, incidentally, were not Leinster Senior Football Championship winners as would usually have been the case at this time for an All-Ireland SFC semi-finalist; the province nominated them to play Kerry due to an outbreak of foot-and-mouth disease. (The 1941 Leinster SFC final, Dublin v Carlow, was held in November, with Dublin winning by 4–6 to 1–4).

== Match ==
This year's final was played on 7 September.

=== Summary ===
Kerry completed a three-in-a-row, with a goal by Tom O'Connor. The attendance was affected by restrictions under "The Emergency", with a thousand fans travelling by peat-fueled train, and two Kerrymen cycling a tandem bicycle from Killarney to Dublin.

It was the second of three All-Ireland SFC titles won by Kerry in the 1940s.

It was also the second of three consecutive All-Ireland SFC finals lost by Galway.

With their 1940 win, Kerry had reached 14 All-Ireland SFC titles, drawing level with Dublin. Dublin had been in the lead since 1892. In 1941, Kerry took the lead; Dublin equalled the new total in 1942, but never again managed to surpass Kerry's total.

=== Details ===
7 September 1941
Final

Kerry	1–8 – 0–7	Galway
Tom Gega O'Connor (1–1), Paddy Bawn Brosnan (0–2), Jimmy Gawksie O'Gorman (0–3), Murt Kelly (0–2)		J Dunne & J Burke (0–3), E Mulhaolland (0–1)

Croke Park, Dublin
Attendance: 45,512
Referee: Patrick McKenna (Limerick)

==== Kerry ====
- 1 D. O'Keeffe
- 2 B. Myers
- 3 J. Keohane
- 4 T. Healy
- 5 B. Dillon (c)
- 6 B. Casey
- 7 E. Walsh
- 8 S. Brosnan
- 9 P. Kennedy
- 10 J. Walsh
- 11 T. O'Connor
- 12 P. B. Brosnan
- 13 J. O'Gorman
- 14 M. Kelly
- 15 C. O'Sullivan

Subs used
T. Landers for B. Myers
M. Lyne for J. Walsh

==== Galway ====
- 1 J. McGauran
- 2 M. Raftery
- 3 P. McDonagh
- 4 D. O'Sullivan (c)
- 5 F. Cunniffe
- 6 B. Beggs
- 7 J. Duggan
- 8 C. Connolly
- 9 D. Kavanagh
- 10 J. Hanniffy
- 11 J. Dunne
- 12 J. Canavan
- 13 N. Mulholland
- 14 P. McDonagh
- 15 J. Burke

Sub used
18 P. Thornton for J. Canavan

Subs not used
16 J. Casey
17 J. Flavin
19 P. Mitchell
20 C. O'Connor
21 B. Nestor
22 L. Kitt
23 J. Lynch
