= 1940 All-Ireland Senior Football Championship final =

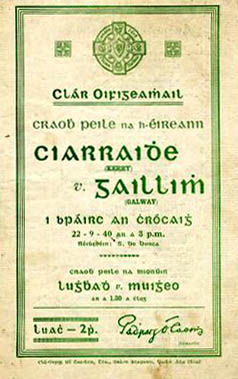
- Official programme
- Event: 1940 All-Ireland Senior Football Championship
| Kerry | Galway |
| 0–7 (7) | 1–3 (6) |
- Date: 22 September 1940
- Venue: Croke Park, Dublin
- Referee: Seamus Burke (Kildare)
- Attendance: 60,821

The 1940 All-Ireland Senior Football Championship final was the 53rd All-Ireland Final and the deciding match of the 1940 All-Ireland Senior Football Championship, an inter-county Gaelic football tournament for the top teams in Ireland.

== Match ==
This year's final was played on 22 September.

=== Summary ===
Joe Duggan scored a goal for Galway just before half-time, but Kerry hit four points in the second half to secure a narrow victory. The game was plagued by fouls, sixty-two frees being awarded in all.

It was the first of three All-Ireland SFC titles won by Kerry in the 1940s.

It was also the first of three consecutive All-Ireland SFC finals lost by Galway.

With their 1940 win, Kerry reached 14 All-Ireland SFC titles, drawing level with Dublin. Dublin had been in the lead since 1892. In 1941, Kerry would take the lead; Dublin equalled the new total in 1942, but never again managed to surpass Kerry's total.

=== Details ===
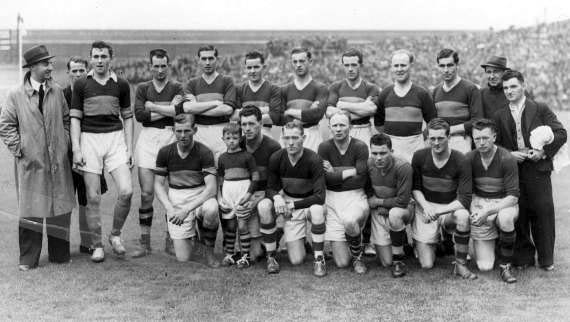
Team of Kerry, champions

22 September 1940
Final

| Kerry | 0–7 – 1–3 | Galway |
|---|---|---|
| Tom Gega O'Connor (0–1), Murt Kelly (0–2), Dan Spring (0–1), Charlie O'Sullivan (0–2), Sub, Paddy Bawn Brosnan (0–1) for Dan Spring | | J Duggan (1–0), B Nestor, J Dunne, J Burke (0–1) each |

Croke Park, Dublin
Attendance: 60,821
Referee: Seamus Burke (Kildare)

Kerry
Galway

==== Kerry ====
- 1 D. O'Keeffe
- 2 B. Myers
- 3 J. Keohane
- 4 T. Healy
- 5 B. Dillon
- 6 B. Casey
- 7 E. Walsh
- 8 S. Brosnan
- 9 J. Walsh
- 10 J. O'Gorman
- 11 T. O'Connor
- 12 P. Kennedy
- 13 M. Kelly
- 14 D. Spring (c)
- 15 C. O'Sullivan

Sub used
P. B. Brosnan for D. Spring

Trainer
C. Brosnan

==== Galway ====
- 1 J. McGauran
- 2 M. Raftery
- 3 M. Connaire
- 4 D. O'Sullivan
- 5 F. Cunniffe
- 6 B. Beggs
- 7 C. Connolly
- 8 J. Dunne (c)
- 9 J. Duggan
- 10 J. Flavin
- 11 J. Burke
- 12 J. Canavan
- 13 M. Higgins
- 13 N. Mulholland
- 14 B. Nestor
