= 1939 All-Ireland Senior Football Championship final =

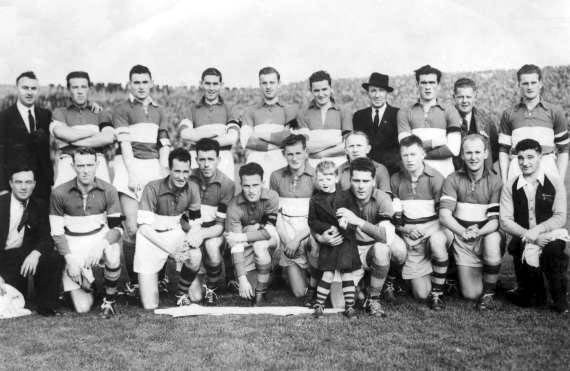
- Kerry (in Dingle shirts), champions
- Event: 1939 All-Ireland Senior Football Championship
Kerry	Meath
2–5 (11)	2–3 (9)
- Date: 24 September 1939
- Venue: Croke Park, Dublin
- Referee: J Flaherty (Offaly)
- Attendance: 46,828

The 1939 All-Ireland Senior Football Championship final was the 52nd All-Ireland Final and the deciding match of the 1939 All-Ireland Senior Football Championship, an inter-county Gaelic football tournament for the top teams in Ireland.

== Match ==
=== Summary ===
Kerry had to play without their captain, Seán Brosnan, who had a heavy cold. Dan Spring (later TD, and father of Tánaiste Dick Spring) scored both Kerry goals. Meath rued their missed chances - they shot 11 wides.

This was the fifth of five All-Ireland SFC titles won by Kerry in the 1930s.

It was also the first championship meeting of Kerry and Meath.

To avoid a colour clash, Kerry wore the red and white of Dingle, county champions at the time.

=== Details ===
24 September 1939
Final

Kerry	2–5 – 2–3	Meath

Croke Park, Dublin
Referee: J Flaherty (Offaly)
Attendance: 46,828

Kerry
Meath

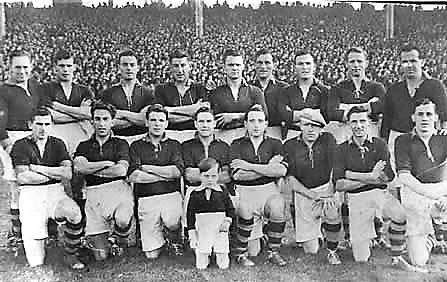
Meath team, runners-up

==== Kerry ====
- 1 Dan O'Keeffe
- 2 Billy Myers
- 3 Joe Keohane
- 4 Tadhg Healy
- 5 Bill Dillon
- 6 Bill Casey
- 7 Eddie Walsh
- 8 Paddy Kennedy
- 9 Jimmy O'Gorman
- 10 Murt Kelly
- 11 Tom O'Connor (c)
- 12 Johnny Walsh
- 13 Charlie O'Sullivan
- 14 Dan Spring
- 15 Tim Landers

Subs
16 Tony McAuliffe
17 Seán Brosnan
18 M. McCarthy
19 Mick Raymond
20 Johnny Moriarty
21 Jim Bawn Fitzgerald
22 Martin Regan

Trainer
Con Brosnan
