= 1903 All-Ireland Senior Football Championship final =

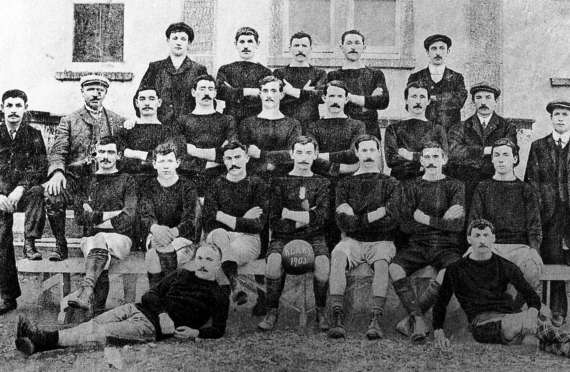
- Kerry, champions
- Event: 1903 All-Ireland Senior Football Championship
Kerry	London
0–11	0–3
- Date: 12 November 1905
- Venue: Jones' Road, Dublin
- Referee: John McCarthy (Kilkenny)
- Attendance: 10,000

The 1903 All-Ireland Senior Football Championship final was the sixteenth All-Ireland Final and the deciding match of the 1903 All-Ireland Senior Football Championship, an inter-county Gaelic football tournament for the top teams in Ireland.

== Match ==
This year's final was not played until 12 November 1905.

=== Summary ===
Sam Maguire captained London Hibernians.

The 1903 final marked the first time Kerry won an All-Ireland SFC title. They would go on to dominate the game for decades to come. Dublin were the dominant force in football at this time with eight All-Ireland SFC titles; within 40 years Kerry had surpassed this and have since left Dublin in the shade in terms of All-Ireland SFC titles secured.

=== Details ===
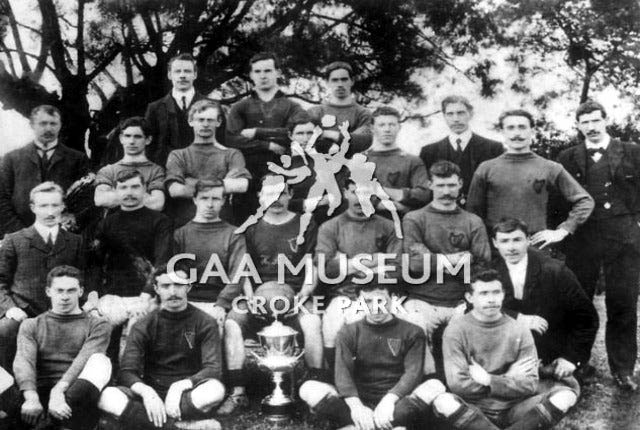
Team of London, runners-up

12 November 1905
Final

Kerry	0–11 – 0–3	London

Jones' Road, Dublin
Attendance: 10,000
Referee: John McCarthy (Kilkenny)

Kerry
London

==== Kerry ====
- 1 Paddy Dillon
- 2 Rody Kirwan
- 3 Con Healy
- 4 Maurice McCarthy
- 5 Florrie O'Sullivan
- 6 Denny Breen
- 7 Austin Stack
- 8 Dan McCarthy
- 9 John Buckley
- 10 Denny Curran
- 11 Jack Myers
- 12 Denny Kissane
- 13 Dick Fitzgerald
- 14 Thady O'Gorman
- 15 Jim O'Gorman
- 16 Willie Lynch
- 17 J. T. Fitzgerald

Subs
Con Ryan for Healy
Patrick Cahill for Kirwan

== Legacy ==
This was the fourth consecutive year that London lost the final heavily; after this, London no longer received a bye to the All-Ireland SFC final.
