= 1904 All-Ireland Senior Football Championship final =

- Event: 1904 All-Ireland Senior Football Championship
Kerry	Dublin
0–5	0–2
- Date: 1 July 1906
- City: Cork
- Referee: John Fitzgerald (Cork)
- Attendance: 10,000

The 1904 All-Ireland Senior Football Championship final was the seventeenth All-Ireland Final and the deciding match of the 1904 All-Ireland Senior Football Championship, an inter-county Gaelic football tournament for the top teams in Ireland.

== Match ==
=== Summary ===
Kerry led 0–4 to 0–2 at half-time, and Dick Fitzgerald scored the only point of the second half to secure victory.

The Irish Independent described the weather as inclement and noted its effect on the attendance.

== Details ==
=== Kerry ===
- 1 Paddy Dillon
- 2 Patrick Cahill
- 3 Con Healy
- 4 Maurice McCarthy
- 5 Florrie O'Sullivan
- 6 Denny Breen
- 7 Austin Stack (c)
- 8 Dan McCarthy
- 9 John Buckley
- 10 Denny Curran
- 11 Jack Myers
- 12 John O'Sullivan
- 13 Dick Fitzgerald
- 14 Thady O'Gorman
- 15 Jim O'Gorman
- 16 Willie Lynch
- 17 J. T. Fitzgerald

=== Dublin ===
- John Lynch (c)
- P. McCann
- Mick Kelly
- Paddy Daly
- Jim Brennan
- Jack Dempsey
- Dave Brady
- Jack Grace
- Mick Keane
- P. O'Callaghan
- T. Murphy
- Mick Barry
- J. Chadwick
- Larry Sheehan
- T. Walsh
- Paddy Casey
- J. Fahy
