= 1909 All-Ireland Senior Football Championship final =

- Event: 1909 All-Ireland Senior Football Championship
Kerry	Louth
1–9 (12)	0–6 (6)
- Date: 5 December 1909
- Venue: Jones' Road, Dublin
- Referee: M. F. Crowe (Dublin)
- Attendance: 16,000
- Weather: Fine

The 1909 All-Ireland Senior Football Championship final was the 22nd All-Ireland Final and the deciding match of the 1909 All-Ireland Senior Football Championship, an inter-county Gaelic football tournament for the top teams in Ireland.

== Match ==
=== Summary ===
Kerry led by 1-3 to 0-3 at half-time and eventually won by double scores to claim their third All-Ireland SFC title, their marksmen being: Jack Skinner (1–2); Paddy Mullane (0–3); Jack Kennelly (0–2); Tom Costelloe (0–1) and Dick Fitzgerald (0–1).

This was also the first championship meeting of Kerry and Louth.

=== Details ===
5 December 1909
Final

Kerry	1-9 – 0-6	Louth
		J. Carvin 0-3 (2f), J. Brennan, T. Matthews, T. Morgan 0-1 each

Jones' Road, Dublin
Attendance: 16,000
Referee: M. F. Crowe (Dublin)

Kerry
Louth

1	Paddy Dillon (Dr Crokes) (gk)
2	Denny Breen (Castleisland Desmonds)
3	Maurice McCarthy (Tralee Mitchels)
4	Tom Costelloe (Tralee Mitchels) (c)
5	Con Healy (Tralee Mitchels)
6	Jack McCarthy (Valentia)
7	Tom Rice (Abbeydorney)
8	Frank Cronin (Tralee Mitchels)
9	Ned Spillane (Dr Crokes)
10	Con Murphy (Dr Crokes)
11	Batt O'Connor (Dingle)
12	Jack Kennelly (Listowel Emmets)
13	Paddy Mullane (Listowel Emmets)
14	John O'Sullivan (Tralee Mitchels)
15	Jack Skinner (Dr Crokes)
16	Dick Fitzgerald (Dr Crokes)
17	Michael J. Quinlan (Tralee Mitchels)

1	Michael Byrne (Dundalk Young Irelands) (gk)
2	John Clarke (Tredaghs)
3	Jimmy Quinn (Tredaghs)
4	Joe Donnelly (Dundalk Young Irelands)
5	Joe Mulligan (Dundalk Young Irelands)
6	Jack Clarke (Tredaghs)
7	Eddie Burke (Tredaghs)
8	Jack Carvin (Tredaghs) (c)
9	Larry McCormack (Tredaghs)
10	Jack Bannon (Tredaghs)
11	Tom Morgan (Tredaghs)
12	Pat Donegan (Tredaghs)
13	Michael Hand (Tredaghs)
14	Tom Matthews (Ardee Volunteers)
15	Eoin Markey (Ardee Volunteers)
16	Johnny Brennan (Dundalk Rangers)
17	Joe Hanlon (Dundalk Rangers)
