= Molan =

Molan is a surname. Notable persons with the surname include:

- Con Molan (1886–1969), Australian rules footballer
- Erin Molan (born 1984), Australian radio and television presenter
- Jim Molan (1950–2023), Australian politician and former major general in the Australian Army
- Peter Molan (1943–2015), New Zealand biochemist
- Stan Molan (1893–1943), Australian rules footballer
