= Denny Curran =

Irish Gaelic footballer and politician

Denis "Denny" Curran (6 December 1875 – 25 August 1968) was an Irish footballer and Fianna Fáil political figure.

== Early life ==
The third son of Patrick Curran, a farmer of Ballyseedy, County Kerry, he was apprenticed as a grocer as a young man, and 'lived in' at Baily's in the Mall in Tralee.

== Football ==
Curran began his footballing career in 1903; in an article in The Kerryman published 28 January 1961, he recounted how in summer he would begin training at the sports field at seven A.M., before working from nine A.M. to eleven P.M., and often being picked up from work by Austin Stack for evening training, missing dinner due to having to return to work. Curran was one of Kerry's players (as a forward) against Kildare in the 1903 All-Ireland home final series of games, contributing to their victory (over London Hibernians)- the first ever win for the Kerry side at this level- by scoring a goal at a critical point in the final match, played on 12 November 1905, which was scored 0-11 to 0-3. The following year, he played again for Kerry, with the team defeating Dublin, in the game played on 1 July 1906, by 0–5 to 0–2 in the final. Although Kerry dominated the game for decades afterwards, their failure to score in the first half of a 1966 game (which Kerry eventually won by two points) against Wicklow led to the players being jeered by their own fans; Curran observed 'Lord bless my soul, I never saw worse in my life.'

== Other activities ==
Outside of his sporting endeavours, Curran was employed as an official of Tralee Harbour Board, serving also as Secretary of the Roger Casement Fianna Fáil Cumann of Tralee, President of the John Mitchel GAA Club, and member of Tralee Urban Council.

== Personal life ==
Curran died 25 August 1968 aged 92, leaving three sons and a daughter. Son Paddy was also a "prominent and successful" footballer. On Curran's death, only Denny Breen remained of the 1903 Kerry winning team.

Curran's younger brother Michael took in the Republican Stephen Fuller at his farm following Fuller's injury in the explosion that killed several of his compatriots during the 'Ballyseedy Massacre' of March 1923.

Curran's great-grandnephew, Micheál Quirke, played for the Kerins O'Rahilly's GAA team and for the Kerry side that won the All-Ireland Senior Football Championship in 2002, 2004, 2006, 2007, and 2009, the Munster Senior Football Championship in 2003, 2004, 2005, and 2007, and the National Football League in 2004, 2006 and 2009.
