= Rody Kirwan =

Irish Gaelic footballer

Personal information
- Native name: Ruairí Ó Ciarubháin (Irish)
- Nickname: Rody
- Born: Roger Kirwan; 3 January 1878 Kilmacthomas, County Waterford, Ireland
- Died: 8 January 1959 (aged 81) Adelphi Hotel, Waterford, Ireland
- Occupation: Bank official

Sport
- Sport: Gaelic football
Clubs
- Years: Club
- Lismore Blackwater Ramblers; Camblin Rovers; Castleisland Desmonds
Club titles
- Waterford titles: 1
Inter-county
- Years: County
- 1898–1900 1901 1902–1907: Waterford; Wexford; Kerry
Inter-county titles
- Munster titles: 3
- All-Irelands: 2

Rody Kirwan (3 January 1878 – 8 January 1959) was an Irish Gaelic footballer. His championship career with the Waterford, Wexford and Kerry senior teams spanned ten seasons from 1898 until 1907.

Born in Kilmacthomas, County Waterford, Kirwan was one of five sons born to Patrick and Catherine Kirwan (née McGrath). He was educated locally and later worked as a bank official.

At club level Kirwan first played competitive football with Lismore Blackwater Ramblers, with whom he won a county senior championship medal in 1899. Kirwan later had championship success with the Camblin Rovers club in Wexford before ending his club career with the Castleisland Desmonds club in County Kerry.

Kirwan first played on the inter-county scene as a member of the Waterford senior team that was defeated by Dublin in the 1898 All-Ireland SFC final. He later lined out with Wexford, before making his debut with the Kerry senior team in 1902. Kirwan went on to win back-to-back All-Ireland SFC medals with Kerry in 1903 and 1904. He also won three successive Munster SFC medals.

== Honours ==
Lismore Blackwater Ramblers

- Waterford Senior Football Championship (1): 1898

Kerry

- All-Ireland Senior Football Championship (2): 1903, 1904
- Munster Senior Football Championship (3): 1903, 1904, 1905
