= 1913 All-Ireland Senior Football Championship final =

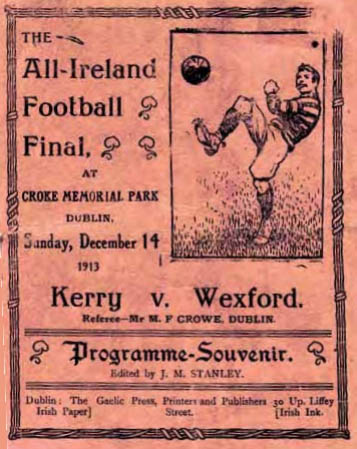
- Official programme
- Event: 1913 All-Ireland Senior Football Championship
Kerry	Wexford
2–2 (8)	0–3 (3)
- Date: 14 December 1913
- Venue: Croke Park, Dublin
- Referee: M. F. Crowe (Dublin)
- Attendance: 17,000

The 1913 All-Ireland Senior Football Championship final was the 26th All-Ireland Final and the deciding match of the 1913 All-Ireland Senior Football Championship, an inter-county Gaelic football tournament for the top teams in Ireland.

== Match ==
=== Summary ===
Kerry won, with Dick Fitzgerald (the captain) scoring 1–2 and Johnny Skinner scoring 1–0, with "Aeroplane" O'Shea as their star.

This was also the first championship meeting of Kerry and Wexford.

=== Details ===
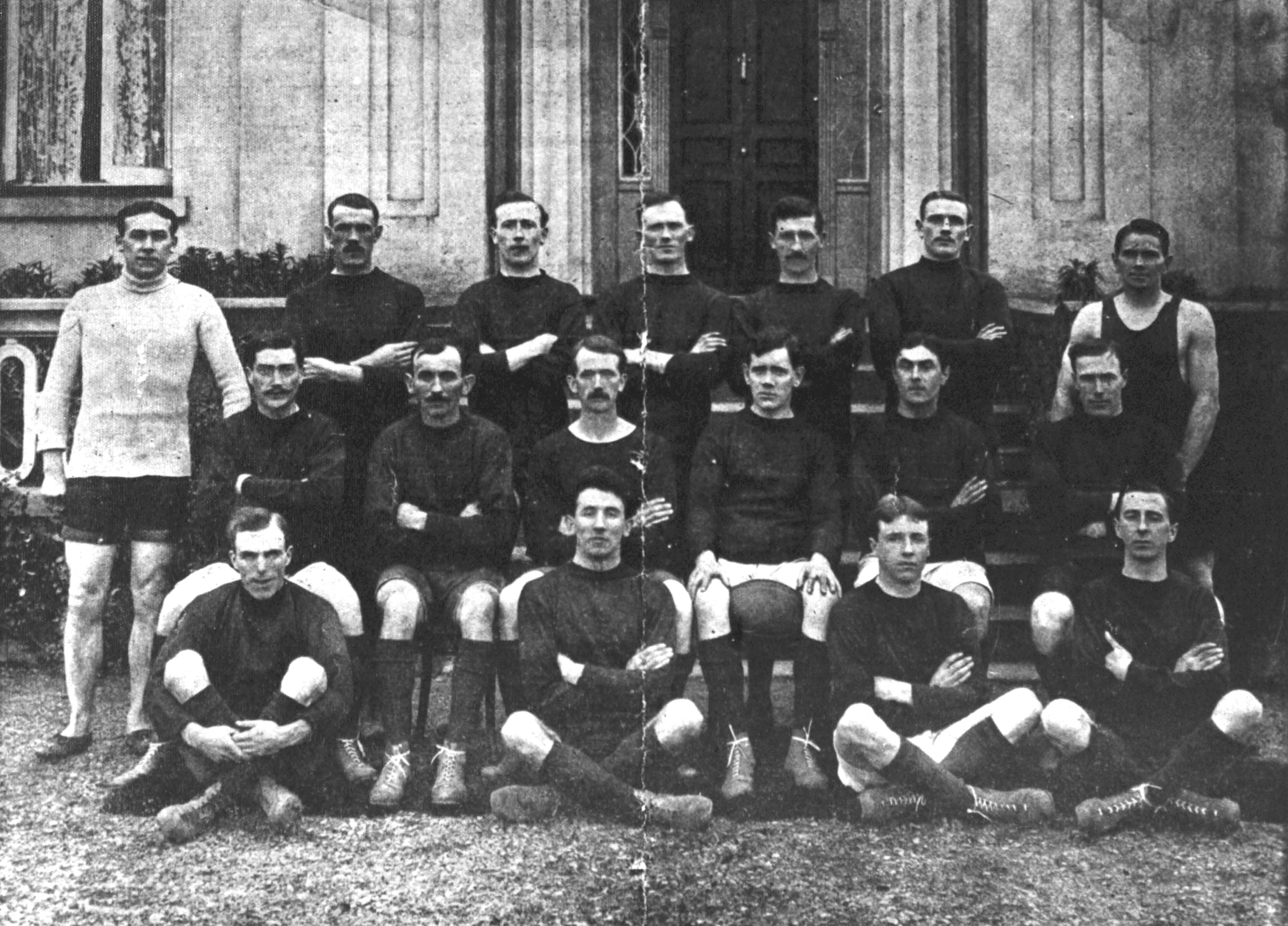
Kerry, champions

14 December 1913
Final

Kerry	2–2 – 0–3	Wexford

Jones' Road, Dublin
Attendance: 17,000
Referee: M. F. Crowe (Dublin)

Kerry	Wexford

==== Kerry ====
- 1 Danny Mullins
- 2 Maurice McCarthy
- 3 Jack Lawlor
- 4 Tom Costelloe
- 5 TomRice
- 6 Paddy Healy
- 7 Paddy Kennelly
- 8 Con Murphy
- 9 Pat O'Shea
- 10 Con Clifford
- 11 Jack Rice
- 12 John O'Mahony
- 13 Johnny Skinner
- 14 Dick Fitzgerald
- 15 Denis Doyle

==== Wexford ====
- Tom Doyle (c)
- Tom Mernagh
- Aidan Doyle
- Jim Cullen (goal)
- Ned Black
- Tom Murphy
- Jim Doyle
- Seán O'Kennedy
- Paddy Mackey
- Gus Kennedy
- Joe Mullally
- Dick Reynolds
- Frank Furlong
- Jim Byrne
- Jim Rossiter
