= Liam Hassett =

Irish Gaelic footballer (born 1975)

Personal information
- Born: Killorglin, Ireland
- Occupation: Teacher

Sport
- Sport: Gaelic football
- Position: Centre Forward
Clubs
- Years: Club
- Laune Rangers; St Anne's
Club titles
- Kerry titles: 3
- Munster titles: 2
- All-Ireland Titles: 1
Inter-county
Years	County	Apps (scores)
1995-2005	Kerry	42 (4-37)
Inter-county titles
- Munster titles: 8
- All-Irelands: 3
- NFL: 2
- All Stars: 1

Liam Hassett (born 1975 in Killorglin, County Kerry) is an Irish Gaelic footballer who has played for Laune Rangers and Dublin side St Anne's, and played at senior level for the Kerry county team between 1995 and 2005. Hassett captained Kerry to the All-Ireland SFC title in 1997. He won All-Ireland Under 21 Medals in 1995 and 1996 as captain. He also won an All-Ireland Club Championship with Laune Rangers in 1996.

He was a selector for the Kerry senior football team, under Éamonn Fitzmaurice.

Sporting positions
Preceded by Mike Hassett	Kerry Senior Football Captain; 1997	Succeeded by Séamus Moynihan
Achievements
Preceded by Tommy Dowd (Meath)	All-Ireland SFC winning captain 1997	Succeeded by Ray Silke (Galway)
