= 1907 All-Ireland Senior Football Championship final =

- Event: 1907 All-Ireland Senior Football Championship
| Dublin | Cork |
| 0–6 | 0–2 |
- Date: 5 July 1908
- City: Tipperary
- Referee: John Fitzgerald (Kildare)
- Attendance: 5,000

The 1907 All-Ireland Senior Football Championship final was the twentieth All-Ireland Final and the deciding match of the 1907 All-Ireland Senior Football Championship, an inter-county Gaelic football tournament for the top teams in Ireland.

== Match ==
=== Summary ===
Dublin's train to Tipperary was delayed, so the match started late. They won convincingly, six points to two.

It was the fourth of five All-Ireland SFC titles won by Dublin in the 1900s.

=== Details ===
==== Dublin ====
- Dave Kelleher
- Dave Brady
- Jim Brennan
- Jack Grace (c)
- John Lynch
- Hugh Hilliard
- Tom Quane
- Jack Dempsey
- Paddy Casey
- Mick Curry
- Mick Barry
- Mick Madigan
- P. O'Callaghan
- Tommy Walsh
- Mick Kelly
- Dan Kavanagh
- Pierce Grace

==== Cork ====
- Billy Mackesy (c)
- Jack McCarthy
- Jack Morrissey
- Mick Mehigan
- Paddy O'Neill
- Jackie Ryan
- Tom Breen
- Jerry Beckett
- Jack Shorten
- Jack O'Driscoll
- Jack Lehane
- Jack Kelleher
- Jack Kent
- Roy O'Sullivan
- Jim Murphy
- Dick Flavin
