= Jack Dempsey (Gaelic footballer) =

Gaelic footballer

Personal information
- Native name: Seán Ó Díomasaigh (Irish)
- Born: 1878 Ballinastraw, County Wexford, Ireland
- Died: 10 December 1913 (aged 35) Ballinastraw
- Occupation: Saddler

Sport
- Sport: Gaelic football
Club
- Years: Club
- Bray Emmets
Club titles
- Dublin titles: 1
Inter-county
- Years: County
- 1902-1907: Dublin
Inter-county titles
- Leinster titles: 4
- All-Irelands: 3

Jack Dempsey (1878 – 10 December 1913) was an Irish Gaelic footballer. His championship career at senior level with the Dublin county team lasted six seasons from 1902 until 1907.

In spite of being a native of County Wexford, Dempsey enjoyed his greatest club success as a member of the Bray Emmets club. He won his sole county senior championship medal in 1901.

Dempsey made his debut on the inter-county scene as a member of the Dublin senior football team during the 1902 championship. Over the course of the next six seasons, he won three All-Ireland medals, beginning with a lone victory as captain of the team in 1902, followed by back-to-back championships in 1906 and 1907. Demspey also won four Leinster medals.

Dempsey died from tuberculosis on 10 December 1913.

== Honours ==
Bray Emmets

- Dublin Senior Football Championship (1): 1901

Dublin

- All-Ireland Senior Football Championship (3): 1902 (c), 1906, 1907
- Leinster Senior Football Championship (4): 1902 (c), 1904, 1906, 1907

Sporting positions
| Preceded by Jack Darcy | Dublin Senior Football Captain; 1906-1907 | Succeeded by |
Achievements
| Preceded by Jack Darcy | All-Ireland Senior Football Final winning captain 1902 | Succeeded by Thady O'Gorman |
