= 1908 All-Ireland Senior Football Championship final =

- Event: 1908 All-Ireland Senior Football Championship
Dublin	London
1–10 (13)	0–4 (4)
- Date: 3 October 1909
- Venue: Jones' Road, Dublin
- Referee: M. Conroy (Dublin)
- Attendance: 10,000

The 1908 All-Ireland Senior Football Championship final was the 21st All-Ireland Final and the deciding match of the 1908 All-Ireland Senior Football Championship, an inter-county Gaelic football tournament for the top teams in Ireland.

== Match ==
=== Summary ===
Dublin won easily, despite having a player sent off after 25 minutes.

It was the fifth of five All-Ireland SFC titles won by Dublin in the 1900s.

=== Details ===
9 May 1909
Home Final

Dublin	0–10 – 0–3	Kerry

Thurles

3 October 1909
Final

Dublin	1–10 – 0–4	London

Jones' Road, Dublin
Attendance: 10,000
Referee: M Conroy (Dublin)

==== Dublin ====
- Dave Kelleher (c)
- Jack Grace
- Hugh Hilliard
- Tommy Walsh
- John Lynch
- Dan Kavanagh
- James Brennan
- Tom Healy
- Fred Cooney
- Jim Brennan
- Paddy Daly
- Tom McAuley
- Paddy Whelan
- Paddy Fallon
- Maurice Collins
- Mick Power
- Jack Shouldice
