= Jack Shouldice =

Irish Gaelic footballer, revolutionary, Gaelic games administrator and civil servant

Personal information
- Native name: Seán Seoldús (Irish)
- Born: John Francis Shouldice; 12 March 1882 Ballaghaderreen, County Mayo, Ireland
- Died: 15 February 1965 (aged 82) St Stephen's Green, Dublin, Ireland
- Occupation: Civil servant

Sport
- Sport: Gaelic football
Clubs
- Years: Club
- Geraldines; Hibernians
Club titles
- Dublin titles: 4
Inter-county
- Years: County
- 1901–1903 1908–1916: London; Dublin
Inter-county titles
- Leinster titles: 1
- All-Irelands: 1

John Francis Shouldice (12 March 1882 – 15 February 1965) was an Irish Gaelic footballer, revolutionary, Gaelic games administrator and civil servant. His championship career at senior level with the London and Dublin county teams spanned sixteen seasons from 1901 until 1916.

Born in Ballaghaderreen, County Mayo, Shouldice was one of twelve children born to Henry and Christina Shouldice (née Meighan). He was educated locally before emigrating to London in 1899. Shouldice remained in London until 1906 when he moved to Dublin to take a position with the Department of Agriculture.

After moving to London, Shouldice first played competitive Gaelic football with the Hibernians club, winning four successive county senior championship medals between 1901 and 1904. He later played with the Geraldine's club in Dublin (no connection to modern Geraldine Patrick Morans of Cornelscourt) and won four more county football championship medals.

Shouldice made his inter-county debut during the 1901 championship when he was selected for the London senior team. He played in three successive All-Ireland finals without success between 1901 and 1903. Shouldice later joined the Dublin senior team. The high point of his career was the winning of the All-Ireland title in 1908, this becoming the first Mayo-born player to claim a winners' medal. He also won a Leinster medal that year. Shouldice continued to play with Dublin until 1916, by which time he was joined on the team by his brother Frank.

After being inducted into the Gaelic League and the Irish Republican Brotherhood during his time in London, Shouldice joined the Irish Volunteers in Dublin in 1913 and was later appointed lieutenant. He was in command of Reilly’s Fort during the 1916 Easter Rising before eventually surrendering at the Four Courts. After a period of internment, Shouldice continued his Volunteer duties before playing an active role in the Irish War of Independence.

Shouldice also became involved in the administrative affairs of the Gaelic Athletic Association, serving as secretary of the Leinster Council for ten years. He died in Dublin on 15 February 1965.

== Honours ==
Hibernians

- London Senior Football Championship (4): 1901, 1902, 1903, 1904

Geradlines

- Dublin Senior Football Championship (4): 1908, 1910, 1914, 1915

Dublin

- All-Ireland Senior Football Championship (1): 1908
- Leinster Senior Football Championship (1): 1908

Sporting positions
Preceded by	Dublin Senior Football Captain; 1910	Succeeded by
