= Paddy Bawn Brosnan =

Kerry Gaelic footballer

Personal information
- Native name: Pádraig Bán Ó Brosnacháin (Irish)
- Born: 16 November 1917 Dingle, County Kerry, Ireland
- Died: 23 July 1995 (aged 77) Dingle, County Kerry, Ireland
- Occupations: Fisherman and publican

Sport
- Sport: Gaelic football
- Position: Left corner-back
Club
- Years: Club
- Dingle
Club titles
- Kerry titles: 6
Inter-county*
Years	County	Apps (scores)
1937–1952	Kerry	40 (2–06)
Inter-county titles
- Munster titles: 8
- All-Irelands: 3
- NFL: 0
- *Inter County team apps and scores correct as of 20:51, 19 October 2016.

Patrick "Paddy Bawn" Brosnan (16 November 1917 – 23 July 1995) was an Irish Gaelic footballer whose league and championship career at senior level with the Kerry county team spanned fifteen years from 1937 to 1952.

Bawn has four All-Ireland titles from 1939, 1940, 1941 and 1946 and eight Munster titles.

Sporting positions
Preceded by Johnny Walsh (Gaelic footballer)	Kerry Senior Football Captain; 1944	Succeeded by unknown
