= Bill Merriman =

Kildare Gaelic footballer

William Merriman (10 November 1878 – 23 November 1963) was an Irish Gaelic footballer. His championship career with the Kildare senior team yielded one All-Ireland SFC medal.
