= Tommy Doyle (Gaelic footballer) =

Irish Gaelic footballer (born 1956)

Personal information
- Nickname: Private
- Born: 3 March 1956 (age 70) Chicago, Illinois, United States
- Occupation: Sales rep
- Height: 6 ft 0 in (183 cm)

Sport
- Sport: Gaelic football
- Position: Half back/forward
Clubs
- Years: Club
- 1970s-1990s 1990s: Annascaul; John Mitchels
Club titles
- Kerry titles: 2
Inter-county
Years	County	Apps (scores)
1977-1988	Kerry	41(0-25)
Inter-county titles
- Munster titles: 9
- All-Irelands: 7
- All Stars: 3

Tommy Doyle (born 3 March 1956 in Chicago, Illinois) is an Irish former Gaelic footballer who played for the Annascaul GAA club and at senior level for the Kerry county team in the 1970s and 1980s. He had a brief spell with the John Mitchels club in the early 1990s. Doyle was an army private at one time, and so had the nickname "Private". He now runs Kinsale Bay Food Company and lives in Cork.

== Playing career ==
=== Inter-county ===
Doyle was a member of one of the most successful teams ever to play Gaelic football. He won seven All-Ireland Senior Football Championship medals with Kerry, and was captain of the team in 1986. He received three consecutive GAA All Stars Awards, in 1984, 1985 and 1986.

Sporting positions
Preceded by Páidí Ó Sé	Kerry Senior Football Captain; 1986	Succeeded by Mikey Sheehy
Awards and achievements
Preceded by Páidí Ó Sé (Kerry)	All-Ireland SFC winning captain 1986	Succeeded by Mick Lyons (Meath)
