= Thady O'Gorman =

Irish Gaelic footballer

Personal information
- Native name: Tadhg Ó Gormáin (Irish)
- Nickname: Thady
- Born: 30 May 1874 Tralee, County Kerry, Ireland
- Died: 15 July 1944 (aged 70) Tralee, County Kerry, Ireland
- Occupation: Printer
- Height: 5 ft 8 in (173 cm)

Sport
- Sport: Gaelic football
- Position: Wing-forward
Club
- Years: Club
- Tralee Mitchels
Club titles
- Kerry titles: 3
Inter-county
- Years: County
- 1903-1904: Kerry
Inter-county titles
- Munster titles: 2
- All-Irelands: 2

Thady O'Gorman (30 May 1874 – 15 July 1944) was an Irish Gaelic footballer. At club level he played with Tralee Mitchels and was an All-Ireland Championship-winning captain with the Kerry senior football team.

== Playing career ==
Born in Tralee, O'Gorman first played Gaelic football when he joined the Tralee Mitchels club as a 17-year-old. He won three county senior championship medals with the club between 1897 and 1903, captaining the team in the latter year. O'Gorman first lined out for the Kerry senior team at the age of 20 but enjoyed his greatest success at the end of his career. In 1903 he became the first player to captain Kerry to the All-Ireland Championship, before claiming a second successive winners' medal the following year. O'Gorman also claimed back-to-back Munster Championship medals during this time.

== Personal life ==
O'Gorman lived in Tralee his entire life and worked as printer with The Kerryman newspaper. His twin brother, Jamesy O'Gorman, was also an All-Ireland medallist with the Kerry senior team. His son, Jimmy O'Gorman, won an All-Ireland medal with Kerry in 1937.

== Honours ==
Tralee Mitchels

- Kerry Senior Football Championship (3): 1897, 1902, 1903 (c)

Kerry

- All-Ireland Senior Football Championship (2): 1903 (c), 1904
- Munster Senior Football Championship (2): 1903 (c), 1904 (c)

Sporting positions
Preceded by Eugene O'Sullivan	Kerry Senior Football Captain; 1903-1904	Succeeded by Austin Stack
Achievements
Preceded by Jack Dempsey	All-Ireland Senior Football Final winning captain 1903	Succeeded by Austin Stack
