= 1905 All-Ireland Senior Football Championship final =

- Event: 1905 All-Ireland Senior Football Championship
Kildare	Kerry
1–7 (10)	0–5 (5)
- Date: 16 June 1907
- Venue: Thurles Sportsfield, Thurles
- Referee: M. F. Crowe (Dublin)
- Attendance: c. 15,000

The 1905 All-Ireland Senior Football Championship final was the eighteenth All-Ireland Final and the deciding match of the 1905 All-Ireland Senior Football Championship, an inter-county Gaelic football tournament for the top teams in Ireland.

== Match ==
=== Summary ===
Kildare's seventeen players consisted of Clane players in the forwards and Roseberry players in the backs. Kildare led 0–6 to 0–1 at half-time, and Jack Connolly's goal secured victory. For the first time, the telephone was used to relay news of victory back to the winning county.

=== Details ===
16 Jun 1907; Final	Kildare	1–7 – 0–5	Kerry	Thurles Sportsfield, Thurles; Attendance: c. 15,000; Referee: M. F. Crowe (Dublin)

Kildare
Kerry

==== Kildare ====
- 1 Jack Fitzgerald
- 2 Jack Murray (c)
- 3 Jack Gorman
- 4 Larry Cribbin
- 5 Tom Keogh
- 6 Bill Merriman
- 7 Eddie Kennedy
- 8 Mick Fitzgerald
- 9 Joe Rafferty
- 10 Mick Murray
- 11 Jack Connolly
- 12 Jim Scott
- 13 Bill Bracken
- 14 Mick Kennedy
- 15 Bill Losty
- 16 Tom Kelly
- 17 Frank Conlan
