= 1901 All-Ireland Senior Football Championship final =

- Event: 1901 All-Ireland Senior Football Championship
Dublin	London
0–14	0–2
- Date: 2 August 1903
- Venue: Jones' Road, Dublin
- Referee: John McCarthy (Kilkenny)
- Attendance: 2,000

The 1901 All-Ireland Senior Football Championship final was the fourteenth All-Ireland Final and the deciding match of the 1901 All-Ireland Senior Football Championship, an inter-county Gaelic football tournament for the top teams in Ireland.

== Match ==
=== Summary ===
Dublin won the final easily, and was received by the Lord Mayor in the Mansion House after the game.

It was the first of five All-Ireland SFC titles won by Dublin in the 1900s.

=== Details ===
Dublin
London

==== Dublin ====
- Jack Darcy (c)
- J. McCullagh
- J. Fahy
- Dan Holland
- Thomas Doyle
- J. O'Brien
- B. Connor
- Paddy Daly
- Mick Madigan
- Luke O'Kelly
- Jack Grace
- P. Redmond
- M. O'Brien
- Peer McCann
- J. Whelan
- T. Lawless
- Val Harris
