= 1935 All-Ireland Senior Football Championship final =

- Event: 1935 All-Ireland Senior Football Championship
| Cavan | Kildare |
| 3–6 (15) | 2–5 (11) |
- Date: 22 September 1935
- Venue: Croke Park, Dublin
- Referee: Stephen Jordan (Galway)

County Donegal Railways poster advertising special trains for the game

The 1935 All-Ireland Senior Football Championship final was the 48th All-Ireland Final and the deciding match of the 1935 All-Ireland Senior Football Championship, an inter-county Gaelic football tournament for the top teams in Ireland.

Cavan won by four points after Kildare centre-back Jack Higgins was injured. The Lilywhites (Kildare) would not reach the All-Ireland SFC final again for another sixty-three years. They also lost that final, this time to Galway, in 1998.

== Details ==
22 September 1935
Final

| Cavan | 3–6 – 2–5 | Kildare |
|---|---|---|
| P. Boylan 2-0, T. O'Reilly 1-0, M.J. Magee 0-3, P. Delvin, H. O'Reilly & J. Smallhouse 0-1. | | M. Geraghty 1–1, T. Mulhall 1–0, P. Martin 0–2, P. Matthews, J. Dowling 0–1. |

Croke Park, Dublin
Referee: Stephen Jordan (Galway)
