= Con Molan =

Australian rules footballer

Personal information
- Full name: Cornelius Francis Molan
- Born: 15 October 1886; Killarney, Victoria
- Died: 9 June 1969 (aged 82); Camperdown, Victoria

Playing career^{1}
Years	Club	Games (Goals)
1904, 1907–08	Geelong	9 (1)
- ^{1} Playing statistics correct to the end of 1908.

Cornelius Francis Molan (also known as Con Ryan; 15 October 1886 – 9 June 1969) was an Australian rules footballer who played with Geelong in the Victorian Football League (VFL).
