= Joe Keohane =

Kerry Gaelic footballer

Personal information
- Native name: Seosamh Ó Ceocháin (Irish)
- Born: 18 August 1918 Tralee, County Kerry, Ireland
- Died: 5 January 1988 (aged 69) Tralee, County Kerry, Ireland
- Occupation: Gael Linn representative
- Height: 6 ft 2 in (188 cm)

Sport
- Sport: Gaelic football
- Position: Full-back
Club
- Years: Club
- 1935–1955: John Mitchels
Club titles
- Kerry titles: 3
Inter-county
| Years | County | Apps (scores) |
| 1936–1948 | Kerry | 44 (0–00) |
Inter-county titles
- Munster titles: 11
- All-Irelands: 5
- NFL: 0

Joseph Nicholas Keohane (18 August 1918 – 5 January 1988) was an Irish Gaelic football manager, selector and former player. His league and championship career at senior level with the Kerry county team spanned thirteen seasons from 1936 to 1948.

== Army career ==
Keohane spent time braced in Renmore Barracks (Dún Uí Mhaoilíosa) in Galway.

== Underage career ==
Keohane made his debut on the inter-county scene at the age of seventeen when he was selected on the Kerry minor team in 1936. He played one championship season with the minor team, and ended his tenure in this grade as an All-Ireland runner-up.

== Senior career ==
Keohane won his third Munster title in a row thanks to a big 4–14 to 0–06 win. For the second season in a row, Keohane and co faced Leinster champions Laois in the All-Ireland semi-final. It was another close game but the Kingdom came out on the right side of a 2–06 to 2–04 scoreline. In the final Kerry faced Galway. Like the year before the sides ended level 2-06 each and needed a replay. A dispute over expenses led to Keohane not playing in the game and was replaced by Paddy ‘Bawn’ Brosnan. There was confusion at the end of the game when many thought the referee Peter Waters had blown the full-time whistle with Galway leading. Jerry O’Leary, chairman of the Kerry Selection Committee outlined their dilemma. Many of the Kerry players could not be found. In the end the title went to Galway on a 2–4 to 0–7 scoreline.

Keohane was back on the team for the 1939 Munster championship. In the final with Tipperary, Kerry had a bye into the final; it was Keohane's only game where he did not line out at Full Back, he played at Left Corner Back as he picked up his fourth Munster title. For the second season in a three, the semi-final ended in a draw on a 0-04 each scoreline. The Munstermen made no mistake the second time around on a 3–08 to 1–04 scoreline. The win saw Keohane line out in his third All-Ireland final in a row and this time Kerry faced Meath. In the end Kerry came out the right side of a 2–5 to 2–3 scoreline and Keohane won his second All-Ireland medal.

Keohane won his third All-Ireland by the bare minimum on a 0–7 to 1–3 scoreline.

Kerry had a bye into the 1941 Munster final where they faced Clare. A 2–9 to 0–6 win won Keohane his sixth Munster title. In the All-Ireland semi-final, it was a Munster v Leinster clash as the Kerrymen faced Dublin. In a low-scoring game, the sides ended 0-4 each. For the third time in four seasons, Kerry faced Galway in the All-Ireland final. A 1–8 to 0–7 win gave Keohane his fourth All-Ireland medal.

In 1942 Keohane won his seventh Munster title after a first win over Cork since 1938 in the Munster final. Kerry faced Galway again in the All-Ireland semi-final. In a low-scoring game Galway on a 1–3 to 0–3 scoreline.

In 1943 Kerry faced Cork in the Munster semi-final. The sides ended level 0–9 each at full-time in Cork. Keohane suffered his only Munster championship loss in a replay with a final score of 1–05 to 1–04.

Keohane returned for the 1944 Munster final where Kerry faced Tipperary. When Kerry won 1–6 to 0–5, he earned his seventh Munster title.

Keohane did not participate in the 1946 Munster championship as Kerry retook the title. He returned for the All-Ireland semi-final as Kerry faced Ulster champions Antrim. In a close game, it was Keohane and co who came out on top after a 2–07 to 0–10 win.

== Railway Cup ==
=== Awards ===
Keohane was posthumously named in the full-back position on the Football Team of the Millennium in 1999, and selected on a list of the 125 greatest Gaelic footballers of all time in a 2009 poll.

Sporting positions
| Preceded by Eddie Dowling | Kerry Senior Football Captain; 1948 | Succeeded by Bill Casey |
| Preceded by Jackie Lyne | Kerry Senior Football Manager; 1971–1972 | Succeeded by Johnny Culloty |
