= Valentia Young Islanders =

Gaelic games club in County Kerry, Ireland

- Oilean Dairbhre Óige
- Founded: 1905
- County: Kerry
- Colours: Red and Yellow
- Grounds: O'Connor Park, Chapeltown
- Coordinates: 51°54′19.85″N 10°20′16.02″W

Playing kits
Standard colours

Valentia Young Islanders are a Gaelic Athletic Association club from Valentia Island, South County Kerry, Ireland. They play in Division 4 of the county league and in the Kerry Novice Football Championship. The club's most recent success has been winning the Munster Junior football championship final after beating Kildimo-Pallaskenry 12 points to 1-8 on 25 January 2015.

The Young Islanders is one of the many clubs affected by mass emigration, losing numerous players in this manner. In recent years the club has struggled to field a sufficient number of players and has at times explored the option of merging with other local clubs.

== Achievements ==
- Munster Junior B Football Champions 2015
- Kerry Intermediate Football Championship Winners 1986, 1995
- Kerry Club Football Championship Winners 1986
- Kerry Junior Football Championship Winners 1981
- Kerry Novice Football Championship Winners 1975, 2014
- South Kerry Senior Football Championship Winners 1939, 1945, 1950, 1957, 1958, 1959, 1961, 1962, 1964, 1979, 1981, 1982, 1983, 1986, 1987, 1988, 1990, 1993, 2000, 2005

== Notable players ==
- Ger Lynch
- Mick O'Connell
- Ger_O'Driscoll_(Gaelic_footballer)
