= Maurice McCarthy (Gaelic footballer) =

Irish Gaelic football player

Personal information
- Born: 11/06/1881 Castleisland, County Kerry
- Died: 12/08/1962

Sport
- Sport: Gaelic football
- Position: Right corner-back
Club
- Years: Club
- Tralee Mitchels
Inter-county
- Years: County
- 1902–1915: Kerry
Inter-county titles
- Munster titles: 8
- All-Irelands: 5
- NFL: 0

Maurice McCarthy (1881–1962) was an Irish sportsperson. A native of Castleisland, Maurice McCarthy took up employment in Tralee with a business firm. With He played Gaelic football with the Tralee Mitchels and was a member of the Kerry senior inter-county team from 1902 until 1915.

== Career ==
Having won three All-Ireland medals by 1910, Maurice McCarthy decided to hang up his football boots for good. But in 1913 came the Croke Memorial Final with Louth which agitated Kerry to its depths, Maurice was recalled from retirement. Willingly he responded and capably he performed, to give Kerry one of its greatest victories, though it does not appear on the record books. He continued to play, and won another All-Ireland that year and the following.

== Personal life ==
A son of Maurice’s, Dan Joe, won a minor All-Ireland title with Kerry and another son John Mitchel, helped Longford to supreme honours in the junior grade.

Sporting positions
Preceded by Austin Stack	Kerry Senior Football Captain; 1905–1907	Succeeded by Con Healy
