= Tom Costelloe (Tralee Mitchels Gaelic footballer) =

Irish Gaelic footballer

Personal information
- Native name: Tomás Mac Coisteala (Irish)
- Nickname: The mile height boy
- Born: 13 January 1887 Tralee, County Kerry, Ireland
- Died: 15 September 1934 (aged 47) Tralee, County Kerry, Ireland
- Occupation: Farmer

Sport
- Sport: Gaelic football
- Position: Right corner-back
Club
- Years: Club
- Tralee Mitchels
Club titles
	Football	Hurling
Kerry titles	4	3
Inter-county
Years	County	Apps (scores)
1903-1918	Kerry	50
Inter-county titles
- Munster titles: 8
- All-Irelands: 3

Thomas Costelloe (13 January 1887 – 15 September 1934) was an Irish Gaelic footballer. His championship career with the Kerry senior spanned fifteen years from 1903 until 1918.

Born in Tralee, County Kerry, Costelloe was born to Thomas and Mary Costelloe. He was educated locally before later working as a farmer and lime kiln operator.

As a dual player, Costelloe first played competitive football and hurling with the Tralee Mitchels club. In a lengthy career he won four county football championship medals between 1907 and 1917, as well as three county hurling championship medals between 1908 and 1912.

Costelloe was just sixteen-years-old when he made his debut as a substitute on the inter-county scene as a member of the Kerry senior football team in 1903. Over the course of the next fifteen years, he won three All-Ireland medals, beginning with a lone triumph in 1909 as captain, followed by back-to-back championships between 1913 and 1914. He also won eight Munster medals.

== Honours ==
Tralee Mitchels

- Kerry Senior Football Championship (4): 1907, 1908, 1910, 1917
- Kerry Senior Hurling Championship (3): 1908, 1911, 1912

Kerry

- All-Ireland Senior Football Championship (3): 1909 (c), 1913, 1914
- Munster Senior Football Championship (8): 1905, 1908, 1909 (c), 1910 (c), 1912, 1913, 1914, 1915

Sporting positions
Preceded by Con Healy	Kerry Senior Football Captain; 1909-1910	Succeeded by
Achievements
Preceded by Dave Kelleher	All-Ireland Senior Football Final winning captain 1909	Succeeded by Larry McCormack
