= Bill Dillon (footballer) =

Irish Gaelic footballer

Personal information
- Native name: Liam Ó Diolúin (Irish)
- Born: 1 June 1905 Dingle, County Kerry
- Died: 23 April 1979 (aged 73)
- Occupation: Bus conductor
- Height: 5 ft 10 in (178 cm)

Sport
- Sport: Gaelic football
- Position: Left wing-back
Club
- Years: Club
- 1920s-1940s: Dingle
Club titles
- Kerry titles: 6
Inter-county
Years	County	Apps (scores)
1937-1944	Kerry	26 (2-03)
Inter-county titles
- Munster titles: 5
- All-Irelands: 4
- NFL: 0

Bill Dillon (1 June 1905 – 23 May 1979) was an Irish sportsperson. He played Gaelic football with his local club Dingle and was a member of the Kerry senior inter-county team from 1937 until 1941. Dillon captained Kerry to a third consecutive All-Ireland title in 1941.

Sporting positions
Preceded by Dan Spring	Kerry Senior Football Captain; 1941	Succeeded by
Achievements
Preceded by Dan Spring (Kerry)	All-Ireland Senior Football winning captain 1941	Succeeded by Joe Fitzgerald (Dublin)
