= Billy Myers (Gaelic footballer) =

Irish Gaelic footballer

Personal information
- Native name: Liam Ó Mír (Irish)
- Born: 13 April 1916 Killarney, County Kerry, Ireland
- Died: 31 August 1963 (aged 47) Tralee, County Kerry, Ireland
- Height: 6 ft 0 in (183 cm)

Sport
- Sport: Gaelic football
- Position: Left corner-back
Club
- Years: Club
- 1930s-1950s: Dr. Crokes
Inter-county
Years	County	Apps (scores)
1937-1943	Kerry	29 (0-00)
Inter-county titles
- Munster titles: 5
- All-Irelands: 4
- NFL: 0

Billy Myers (13 April 1916 – 31 August 1963) was an Irish sportsperson. He played Gaelic football with his local club Dr. Crokes and was a member of the Kerry senior inter-county team from 1937 until 1943.

In a brief senior inter-county career, Myers won almost every honour in the game at senior level. He won four All-Ireland medals, five Munster medals, and one Railway Cup medals with Munster.
