= Murt Kelly =

Irish Gaelic footballer

Personal information
- Nickname: Murt
- Born: 28 March 1911 Beaufort, County Kerry, Ireland
- Died: 6 February 1998 (aged 86) Beaufort, County Kerry, Ireland
- Occupation: National school teacher

Sport
- Sport: Gaelic football
- Position: Full-forward
Club
- Years: Club
- Beaufort
Club titles
- Kerry titles: 0
Inter-county
Years	County	Apps (scores)
1932-1934 1936-1944	Dublin; Kerry	28 (7-52)
Inter-county titles
- Munster titles: 6
- All-Irelands: 3
- NFL: 0

Mortimer Kelly (28 March 1911 – 6 February 1998) was an Irish Gaelic footballer. He played for his local club Beaufort and was a member of the Kerry senior inter-county team in the 1936 and 1944 seasons.
