= 1941 All-Ireland Senior Football Championship =

Football championship

All-Ireland Champions
- Winning team: Kerry (15th win)
- Captain: Bill Dillon

All-Ireland Finalists
- Losing team: Galway
- Captain: Dinny O'Sullivan

Provincial Champions
- Munster: Kerry
- Leinster: Dublin
- Ulster: Cavan
- Connacht: Galway

Championship statistics

The 1941 All-Ireland Senior Football Championship was the 55th staging of Ireland's premier Gaelic football knock-out competition. Kerry won their fifteenth title, moving ahead of Dublin in the all-time standings.

== Foot-and-mouth disease ==
There was major disruption to the format of the 1941 championship due to a serious outbreak of foot-and-mouth disease in many parts of Munster and south Leinster. The championship was run on a knockout provincial basis as usual; however, there was a certain amount of tweaking required to cope with the situation. Dublin, for instance, did not contest the All-Ireland semi-final as Leinster champions; they were nominated to play the game and their Leinster final against Carlow (which Dublin won) was postponed until November.

== Munster Championship format change ==
Kerry, were a bye team to the Munster final, Cork a bye team to the Munster semi-final, A Preliminary Round game was contested between Tipperary and Waterford – the winners were awarded the Quarter-final against Clare. Limerick refused to take part in the Championship. It was also used in the 1939 championship but this format did not exist again until 1980.

== Results ==
=== Connacht Senior Football Championship ===
29 June 1941
Semi-Final

Galway	0–10 – 1–5	Mayo
		J Carney (0–1), PJ Judge (0–1), P Laffey (0–1); M O’Malley (0–1) & T Hoban (1–1).

Tuam
Attendance: 15,000

6 July 1941
Semi-Final

Roscommon	1–9 – 0–5	Sligo

Boyle

20 July 1941
Final

Galway	0–8 – 1–4	Roscommon

St. Coman's Park, Roscommon
Attendance: 15,000

=== Leinster Senior Football Championship ===
27 April 1941
Preliminary Round

Longford	1–5 – 1–3	Westmeath

Pearse Park, Longford

11 May 1941
Preliminary Round

Kildare	2–5 – 1–7	Offaly
J.Martin (2f) 1–2, T.Dalton 1–0, R.Martin, M.Brosnan, T.Mulhall 0–1.

O'Connor Park, Tullamore
Referee: M Lynch

11 May 1941
Preliminary Round

Wexford	2–3 – 1–5	Wicklow

Enniscorthy

18 May 1941
Preliminary Round

Dublin	2–7 – 3–4	Louth

Drogheda Park, Drogheda

25 May 1941
Preliminary Round Replay

Dublin	1–9 – 1–4	Louth

Croke Park, Dublin

18 May 1941
Quarter-Final

Carlow	3–4 – 3–1	Laois

Dr. Cullen Park, Carlow

1 June 1941
Quarter-Final

Dublin	1–8 – 1–6	Meath

Cusack Park, Mullingar

8 June 1941
Quarter-Final

Kildare	5–7 – 0–6	Longford
J.Malone, M.Brosnan, T.Dalton 1–1, J.Martin 0–2, T.Mulhall, J.Mackey 0–1.

Cusack Park, Mullingar

8 June 1941
Semi-Final

Carlow	3–10 – 4–7	Wexford

Dr. Cullen Park, Carlow

22 June 1941
Semi-Final Replay

Carlow	2-7– 2–7 A.E.T.	Wexford

Wexford Park, Wexford

13 July 1941
Semi-Final

Dublin	2–11 – 2–10	Kildare
Matt Fletcher 2–0, Tommy Banks 0–6 (0-5f), Jimmy Joy and Gerry Fitzgerald 0–2 each, Johnny Counihan 0–1		Joe Martin 1–4 (0-2f), Peter Waters 1–2 (1–0 pen), Mick Brosnan 0–2 (0-1f), Micky Geraghty and Tommy Mulhall 0–1 each

Croke Park, Dublin

20 July 1941
Semi-Final 2nd Replay

Carlow	1-12– 3–6 A.E.T.	Wexford

Croke Park, Dublin

27 July 1941
Semi-Final 3rd Replay

Carlow	2-8– 0–3	Wexford

Croke Park, Dublin

9 November 1941
Final

Dublin	4–6 – 1–4	Carlow
Tommy Banks 0-4f, Gerry Fitzgerald, Matt Fletcher, Paddy O'Connor, T McCann 1–0 each, Con Martin and Jimmy Joy 0–1 each		Tom Walker 1–1, Johnny Doyle 0-2f, Willie Hosey 0–1

Dr. Cullen Park, Carlow
Referee: Tom Kehoe (Wexford)

=== Munster Senior Football Championship ===
11 May 1941
Preliminary Round

Tipperary	1–6 – 1–5	Waterford

Fraher Field, Dungarvan
Referee: A. Scannell ( C )

18 May 1941
Quarter-Final

Clare	Won – Lost	Tipperary

25 May 1941
Semi-Final

Clare	1–8 – 1–3	Cork
		M. Murphy (0–1) & J. Young (1–2).

Cusack Park, Ennis

10 August 1941
Final

Kerry	2–9 – 0–6	Clare
Johnny Walsh (0–2), Paddy Bawn Brosnan (0–1), Murt Kelly (1–3) & Charlie O'Sullivan (1–3).

Gaelic Grounds, Limerick

=== Ulster Senior Football Championship ===
8 June 1941
Quarter-Final

Armagh	4–8 – 1–17	Tyrone

Athletic Grounds, Armagh

15 June 1941
Quarter-Final

Down	5–4 – 0–4	Antrim

Corrigan Park, Belfast

6 July 1941
Quarter-Final Replay

Armagh	0–1 – 3–13	Tyrone

Fr. Peter Campbell Park, Coalisland

6 July 1941
Quarter-Final

Monaghan	3–2 – 3–7	Cavan

Breffni Park, Cavan

13 July 1941
Semi-Final

Cavan	0–9 – 0–7	Donegal

Bundoran
Attendance: 3,000

13 July 1941
Semi-Final

Tyrone	1–10 – 1–9	Down

St. Patrick's Park, Newcastle

3 August 1941
Final

Cavan	3–9 – 0–5	Tyrone

Athletic Grounds, Armagh

=== All-Ireland Senior Football Championship ===
10 August 1941
Semi-Final

Kerry	0–4 – 0–4	Dublin
Murt Kelly (0–4).

Croke Park, Dublin

The 1941 semi-final replay, held in Tralee, was the last All-Ireland semi-final replay to be held outside Croke Park until the 1983 replay between Cork and Dublin in Páirc Uí Chaoimh.

17 August 1941
Semi-Final Replay

Kerry	2–9 – 0–3	Dublin
S. Brosnan (0–2), T. G. O'Connor (1–0), P. B. Brosnan (0–1), J. G. O'Gorman (0–1), M. Kelly (0–5) & C. O'Sullivan (1–0).

Tralee

17 August 1941
Semi-Final

Galway	1–12 – 1–4	Cavan

Croke Park, Dublin

7 September 1941
Final

Kerry	1–8 – 0–7	Galway
Tom Gega O'Connor (1–1), Paddy Bawn Brosnan (0–2), Jimmy Gawksie O'Gorman (0–3) & Murt Kelly (0–2).		J. Dunne & J. Burke (0–3) & E. Mulhaolland (0–1).

Croke Park, Dublin
Attendance: 45,512
Referee: Patrick McKenna (Limerick)

== Championship statistics ==
=== Miscellaneous ===
- Roscommon return to Connacht championship for the first time since 1937.
- Some games were affected by foot and mouth problems. It meant that the Tipperary vs Clare game awarded to Clare without being played & only at least 25 instead of the usual 31–32 teams took part in the championship.
- Kerry won their second ever three in a row as All Ireland Champions giving a total of 15 titles the most for a year.
