= Dan Kavanagh (Gaelic footballer) =

Irish Gaelic footballer

Personal information
- Native name: Dónall Caomhánach (Irish)
- Born: 1921 Dunquin, County Kerry, Ireland
- Died: 27 January 2008 (aged 86) Killarney, County Kerry, Ireland
- Occupation: Engineer

Sport
- Sport: Gaelic Football
- Position: Centre-forward
Clubs
- Years: Club
- Dingle; Killarney; Dick Fitzgeralds
Club titles
- Kerry titles: 3
College
- Years: College
- 1939-1943: University College Galway
College titles
- Sigerson titles: 3
Inter-county
- Years: County
- 1941-1943 1944-1950: Galway; Kerry
Inter-county titles
- Connacht titles: 2
- Munster titles: 5
- All-Irelands: 1
- NFL: 0

Daniel Kavanagh (1920 - 27 January 2008) was an Irish Gaelic footballer. His league and championship career with the Galway and Kerry senior teams lasted ten seasons from 1941 until 1950.

Kavanagh made his debut on the inter-county scene at the age of sixteen when he was selected for the Kerry minor team. He had two championship seasons with the minor team, before ending his underage career as an All-Ireland runner-up. Kavanagh later joined the Galway senior team, making his debut during the 1941 championship. Over the next three years he won two Connacht medals, before joining the Kerry senior team in 1944. Kavanagh won his sole All-Ireland medal with the team in 1946. He also won five Munster medals before retiring from inter-county football in 1950.
