= Tralee Mitchels GAA =

Gaelic games club in County Kerry, Ireland

- Founded: 1888
- County: Kerry
- Grounds: Tralee

Playing kits
Standard colours

Senior Club Championships
	All Ireland	Munster champions	Kerry champions
Football:	2	3	9
Hurling:	0	0	3

Tralee Mitchels were a Gaelic Athletic Association club in Tralee, County Kerry, Ireland before the formation of the three Tralee clubs namely John Mitchels, Austin Stacks and Kerins O'Rahilly's. They were one of the top teams in the county winning Football County Championships in 1896, 1897, 1902, 1903, 1907, 1908, 1910, 1917 and 1919. They also won three Hurling County Championship in 1908, 1911, 1912

The first recorded meeting of Tralee Mitchels club officers was on 29 January 1888 at the Young Ireland Society Rooms.

== Honours ==
- Kerry Senior Football Championship (9): 1896, 1897, 1902, 1903, 1907, 1908, 1910, 1917, 1919
- Kerry Senior Hurling Championship (3): 1908, 1911, 1912
- Munster Senior Football Championship (3): 1903, 1904, 1905
- All-Ireland Senior Football Championship (2): 1903, 1904

== County championship winning captains ==
Football

- 1896:
- 1897: James O'Connell
- 1902: Edward Hannafin
- 1903: Thady O'Gorman
- 1907: Maurice McCarthy
- 1908: Tom Costello
- 1910: Con Healy
- 1917: Jack McGaley
- 1919: Martin Carroll

Hurling

- 1908: Dan Mullins
- 1911: Paddy O'Mahoney
- 1912: Tom Costello
