= Dick Fitzgerald (Gaelic footballer) =

Irish Gaelic footballer

Personal information
- Native name: Ristéard Mac Gearailt (Irish)
- Nickname: Dickeen
- Born: Gortnagowan, Sneem, Killarney, County Kerry

Sport
- Sport: Gaelic football
- Position: Right wing-back
Club
Years	Club	Apps (scores)
1900s-1920s	Dr. Crokes	58
Club titles
- Kerry titles: 3
Inter-county
- Years: County
- 1903-1923: Kerry
Inter-county titles
- Munster titles: 10
- All-Irelands: 5

Dick Fitzgerald (1882–1930) was an Irish sportsperson. He played Gaelic football with his local club Dr. Crokes in Killarney, and was a member of the Kerry senior inter-county team from 1903 until 1923. Fitzgerald captained Kerry to back-to-back All-Ireland titles in 1913 and 1914

== Biography ==
Dick was born at 15 College Street, Killarney on 2 October 1882. After his early schooling at St. Brendan's College, Killarney he moved to Cork. He learned much of his football at Presentation Brothers College, Cork and was helping the Nil Desperandum Club before he was eighteen.

== Playing career ==
Fitzgerald played with Kerry against Kildare in the 1903 All-Ireland final, winning the championship after three previous encounters.

In 1906, he visited the US and played for Kerry in the New York Championship, which they won. He also took part in the Croke Memorial, which pitted Kerry against Louth. This game went to a replay with Kerry winning it at Jones Road. It was the first time a four-figure sum was received for a match and with this money the G.A.A purchased Croke Park in Dublin.

Fitzgerald captained the two winning teams of 1913 and 1914 against Wexford but retired from the game after Kerry's defeat in 1915 against the same opposition.

After the Easter Rising he was held in detention at Frongoch internment camp in Wales. Whilst there, he organised Gaelic football matches.

== Later life ==
He later wrote a book on Gaelic football entitled How to Play Gaelic Football which was the first of its kind in the organisation.

After retiring from play, he continued on the administrative side of the organisation. He became representative to the Central Council in 1917, Kerry Selector in 1918, and delegate to Congress in 1919. He served on the Munster Council from 1920 until his death. He was the first chairman of the East Kerry Board and also Chairman of Dr. Crokes GAA Club. In 1929 he was appointed a special vice-chairman of the Kerry Selection Committee without a vote, in appreciation of his service to the county. Dick was also a member of Killarney Urban District Council from 1917 until his death.

== Death ==
On 26 September 1930 Fitzgerald died following injuries sustained when falling from the roof of the Killarney courthouse. The circumstances of his death were never fully explained but it was claimed that he was drinking heavily at the time.

Immediately after his death, the Dr Croke Club began a campaign to develop a field in his honour. Following several years of fundraising, Fitzgerald Stadium opened in May 1936.

Sporting positions
Preceded by Patrick Cahill	Kerry Senior Football Captain; 1913–1915	Succeeded by Denis Doyle (Kerry footballer)
Achievements
Preceded by Jim Smith (Louth)	All-Ireland Senior Football winning captain 1913–1914	Succeeded by Seán O'Kennedy (Wexford)
