= Johnny Walsh (Gaelic footballer) =

Irish Gaelic footballer

Personal information
- Native name: Seán Breathnach (Irish)
- Born: 20 August 1909 Ballylongford, County Kerry, Ireland
- Died: 23 June 1998 (aged 88) Ballylongford, County Kerry, Ireland
- Occupation: National school teacher

Sport
- Sport: Gaelic football
Clubs
- Years: Club
- Ballylongford; Shannon Rangers
Club titles
- Kerry titles: 2
Inter-county
- Years: County
- 1932-1944: Kerry
Inter-county titles
- Munster titles: 10
- All-Irelands: 5
- NFL: 0

John Bernard Walsh (20 August 1909 – 23 June 1998) was an Irish Gaelic footballer. His championship career with the Kerry senior team spanned thirteen seasons from 1932 until 1944.

== Career ==
Walsh first played competitive football for the Ballylongford club. He won a number of North Kerry senior championship medals with the club towards the end of his career. As a member of the Shannon Rangers divisional team Walsh won two county senior championship medals.

Walsh made his inter-county debut during the 1932 championship. Over the course of the next thirteen seasons he won five All-Ireland medals, beginning with wins in 1932 and 1937 before winning three successive championships from 1939 to 1941. Walsh also won ten Munster medals. He played his last game for Kerry in September 1944.

After being selected for the Munster inter-provincial team for the first time in 1941, Walsh was a regular for three successive seasons. During that time he won one Railway Cup medal.

== Honours ==
Shannon Rangers

- Kerry Senior Football Championship (2): 1942, 1945

Kerry

- All-Ireland Senior Football Championship (5): 1932, 1937, 1939, 1940, 1941
- Munster Senior Football Championship (10): 1932, 1933, 1934, 1937, 1938, 1939, 1940, 1941, 1942, 1944

Munster

- Railway Cup (1): 1941

Sporting positions
Preceded by Tom Gega O'Connor	Kerry Senior Football Captain; 1942-1943	Succeeded by Paddy Bawn Brosnan
