= 1903 All-Ireland Senior Football Championship =

Football championship

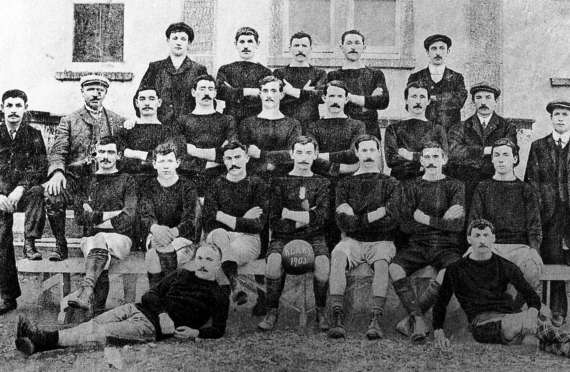

All-Ireland Champions
- Winning team: Kerry (1st win)
- Captain: Thady Gorman

All-Ireland Finalists
- Losing team: Kildare

Provincial Champions
- Munster: Kerry
- Leinster: Kildare
- Ulster: Cavan
- Connacht: Mayo

Championship statistics

The 1903 All-Ireland Senior Football Championship was the 17th staging of Ireland's premier Gaelic football knock-out competition. In the Leinster Quarter final Kildare ended Dublin's period as All Ireland champions. Kerry won their first football All-Ireland.

== Format ==
The four provincial championships are played as usual. The four champions play in the "Home" championship, with the winners of the Home final going on to face London in the All-Ireland final.

== Results ==
=== Connacht ===
Connacht Senior Football Championship

23 April 1905
Final

Mayo	3–6 – 0–1	Roscommon

Claremorris

=== Leinster ===
Leinster Senior Football Championship

November 1903
Preliminary Round

Kilkenny	0–0 – 0–0	Carlow

Kilkenny

November 1903
Preliminary Round

Louth	0–0 – 0–0	Meath

Dundalk

November 1903
Preliminary Round Replay

Louth	0–7 – 0–4	Meath

Dundalk

November 1903
Preliminary Round

Longford	0–2 – 2–12	Wexford

Jones Road, Dublin

1903
Quarter-Final

Kilkenny	1–13 – 0–0	Westmeath

Jones Road, Dublin

1903
Quarter-Final

Louth	1–6 – 0–1	Wexford

Jones Road, Dublin

21 August 1904
Quarter-Final

Offaly	0–2 – 1–5	Laois

Maryboro
Referee: J McCarthy

18 September 1904
Quarter-Final

Kildare	3–11 – 0–3	Dublin

Geashill

23 October 1904
Semi-Final

Kildare	4–5 – 1–1	Laois

Maryboro

1904
Semi-Final

Kilkenny	1–4 – 0–1	Louth

Jones Road, Dublin

11 December 1904
Final

Kildare	1–2 – 0–5	Kilkenny

Wexford

26 February 1905
Final Replay

Kildare	1–6 – 1–5	Kilkenny

Wexford

A replay was ordered due to a disputed disallowed Kilkenny point.

4 June 1905
Final, Second Replay

Kildare	0–9 – 0–1	Kilkenny
Jim Scott 0–3 (0-1f), Joe Rafferty (0-2f), Johnny Dunne, Joyce Conlan 0–2 each		Tom Hyland 0–1

Jones' Road, Dublin
Referee: M. F. Crowe (Dublin)

=== Munster ===
Munster Senior Football Championship

1903
Quarter-Final

Clare	1–5 – 0–4	Limerick

Limerick

13 June 1904
Quarter-Final

Kerry	4–8 – 0–3	Waterford

Turners Cross

19 June 1904
Semi-Final

Cork	1–5 – 0–4	Tipperary

Killmallock
Referee: L. O'Toole (D)

7 August 1904
Semi-Final

Kerry	2–7 – 2–0	Clare

Markets Field, Limerick

30 October 1904
Final

Kerry	1–7 – 0–4	Cork

Markets Field, Limerick

=== Ulster ===
Ulster Senior Football Championship

6 January 1905
Quarter-Final

Monaghan	0–11 – 0–3	Fermanagh

Enniskillen

12 March 1905
Semi-Final

Cavan	0–11 – 0–3	Monaghan

Newbliss

23 April 1905
Final

Cavan	0–5 – 0–5	Armagh

Abbey Park, Armagh

28 May 1905
Final Replay

Cavan	0–5 – 0–5 A.E.T.	Armagh

Cavan

11 June 1905
Final, Second Replay

Cavan	0–8 – 0–4	Armagh

Newbliss

=== Semi-finals ===
7 May 1905
Home Semi-Final

Kerry	2–7 – 0–4	Mayo

Limerick

18 June 1905
Home Semi-Final

Kildare	0–8 – 0–0	Cavan

Jones' Road, Dublin

23 July 1905
Home Final

Kerry	1–4 – 1–3 Unfinished	Kildare

Tipperary

Unfinished game – replay ordered.

27 August 1905
Home Final Replay

Kerry	0–7 – 1–4	Kildare

Cork

15 October 1905
Home Final, Second Replay

Kerry	0–8 – 0–2	Kildare

Cork

=== Final ===
12 November 1905
Final

Kerry	0–11 – 0–3	London

Jones' Road, Dublin
Attendance: 10,000
Referee: John McCarthy (Kilkenny)

== Statistics ==
- Kildare win their first ever Leinster final.
- Kerry win their first ever All Ireland final.
