= 1904 All-Ireland Senior Football Championship =

Football championship

All-Ireland Champions
- Winning team: Kerry (2nd win)
- Captain: Austin Stack

All-Ireland Finalists
- Losing team: Dublin
- Captain: John Lynch

Provincial Champions
- Munster: Kerry
- Leinster: Dublin
- Ulster: Cavan
- Connacht: Mayo

Championship statistics

The 1904 All-Ireland Senior Football Championship was the 18th staging of Ireland's premier Gaelic football knock-out competition. Kerry were the winners.

== Results ==
=== Connacht ===
Connacht Senior Football Championship

26 March 1905
Semi-Final

Mayo	0–7 – 0–4	Galway

Claremorris

23 April 1905
Final

Mayo	3–6 – 0–1	Roscommon

Claremorris

=== Leinster ===
Leinster Senior Football Championship

1904
Preliminary round 1

Laois	0–0 – 0–15	Louth

Jones' Road, Dublin

1904
Preliminary round 2

Meath	0–2 – 0–7	Louth

1906
Quarter-Final

Kilkenny	0–6 – 0–5	Laois

Kilkenny

1906
Quarter-Final

Meath	0–5 – 0–6	Wexford

Jones' Road, Dublin

An objection was made and a replay ordered.

1906
Quarter-Final 1st Replay

Meath	2–3 – 2–3 A.E.T.	Wexford

Athy

1906
Quarter-Final 2nd Replay

Meath	0–3 – 0–8	Wexford

Athy

21 January 1906
Quarter-Final

Offaly	2–1 – 1–5	Louth

Jones' Road, Dublin

18 March 1906
Quarter-Final

Dublin	0–9 – 0–5	Kildare

Jones' Road, Dublin

1906
Semi-Final

Dublin	0–11 – 0–6	Louth

Dundalk

1906
Semi-Final

Kilkenny	0–6 – 0–3	Wexford

Jones' Road, Dublin

17 June 1906
Final

Dublin	0–5 – 0–1	Kilkenny
John Lynch (0-2f) and J Chadwick 0–2 each, Jim Brennan 0–1		Dan Stapleton 0–1

Wexford
Attendance: 5,000
Referee: Jack Fitzgerald (Kildare)

=== Munster ===
Munster Senior Football Championship

1904
Preliminary round

Limerick	1–4 – 0–4	Waterford

Tipperary

Despite a Limerick win Waterford still qualified.

1904
Quarter-Final

Kerry	0–6 – 0–2	Clare

Limerick

11 June 1905
Quarter-Final

Waterford	1–11 – 0–6	Tipperary

Carrick-on-Suir

29 October 1905
Semi-Final

Kerry	1–4 – 0–0	Cork

Market's Field, Limerick

10 December 1905
Final

Kerry	0–3 – 0–3	Waterford

Cork Athletic Grounds

7 January 1906
Final Replay

Kerry	2–3 – 0–2	Waterford

Dungarvan

=== Ulster ===
Ulster Senior Football Championship

1904
Quarter-Final

Tyrone	0–0 – 0–0	Derry

1904
Quarter-Final

Monaghan	0–4 – 0–1	Fermanagh

Enniskillen

1904
Quarter-Final

Down	0–1 – 0–15	Armagh

Newry

1904
Quarter-Final

Cavan	0–5 – 0–2	Antrim

Cavan

An objection was made and a replay ordered.

1904
Quarter-Final

Monaghan	0–0 – 0–0	Antrim

1904
Quarter-Final

Cavan	0–5 – 0–3	Antrim

Cavan

1904
Semi-Final

Armagh	0–12 – 0–3	Tyrone

Castleblaney

An objection was made and a replay ordered.

1904
Semi-Final Replay

Armagh	0–24 – 0–1	Tyrone

Armagh

1904
Semi-Final

Cavan	1–8 – 0–3	Monaghan

Newbliss

1904
Final

Cavan	0–5 – 0–5	Armagh

Cavan

1904
Final Replay

Cavan	0–8 – 0–4	Armagh

Newbliss

=== Semi-finals ===
6 May 1906
Semi-Final

Kerry	4–10 – 0–1	Cavan

Jones' Road, Dublin

13 May 1906
Semi-Final

Dublin	0–8 – 1–4	Mayo

Athlone, Westmeath

=== Final ===
1 July 1906
Final

Kerry	0–5 – 0–2	Dublin

Cork
Attendance: 10,000
Referee: John Fitzgerald (Cork)

== Statistics ==
=== Miscellaneous ===
- Kerry become the first Munster county to be All Ireland champions for the second year in a row.
- Westmeath beat Longford in Leinster SFC Round 1 by 0–7 to 0–5 on 31 July 1904 (ref: JW Kenny) – Why is this missing from above?
