= Bill Casey (Gaelic footballer) =

Irish Gaelic footballer (1918–1999)

Personal information
- Native name: Liam Ó Cathasaigh (Irish)
- Born: 23 May 1918 Lispole, County Kerry, Ireland
- Died: 3 March 1999 (aged 80) Lispole, County Kerry, Ireland
- Occupation: Farmer

Sport
- Sport: Gaelic football
- Position: Centre-back
Club
- Years: Club
- 1930s-1950s: Dingle
Club titles
- Kerry titles: 6
Inter-county
Years	County	Apps (scores)
1938-1949	Kerry	29 (0-00)
Inter-county titles
- Munster titles: 5
- All-Irelands: 4
- NFL: 0

William Robert Casey (23 May 1918 – 3 March 1999) was an Irish sportsperson. He played Gaelic football with his local club Dingle and later Lispole and was a member of the Kerry senior inter-county team from 1938 until 1949. His nephew Brian Mullins played with Dublin in the 1970s and 1980s winning 4 All Ireland titles. Both his sons Gearóid, Gabriel and Riobard played with Kerry at all levels.
