= Austin Stack =

Irish republican (1879–1929)

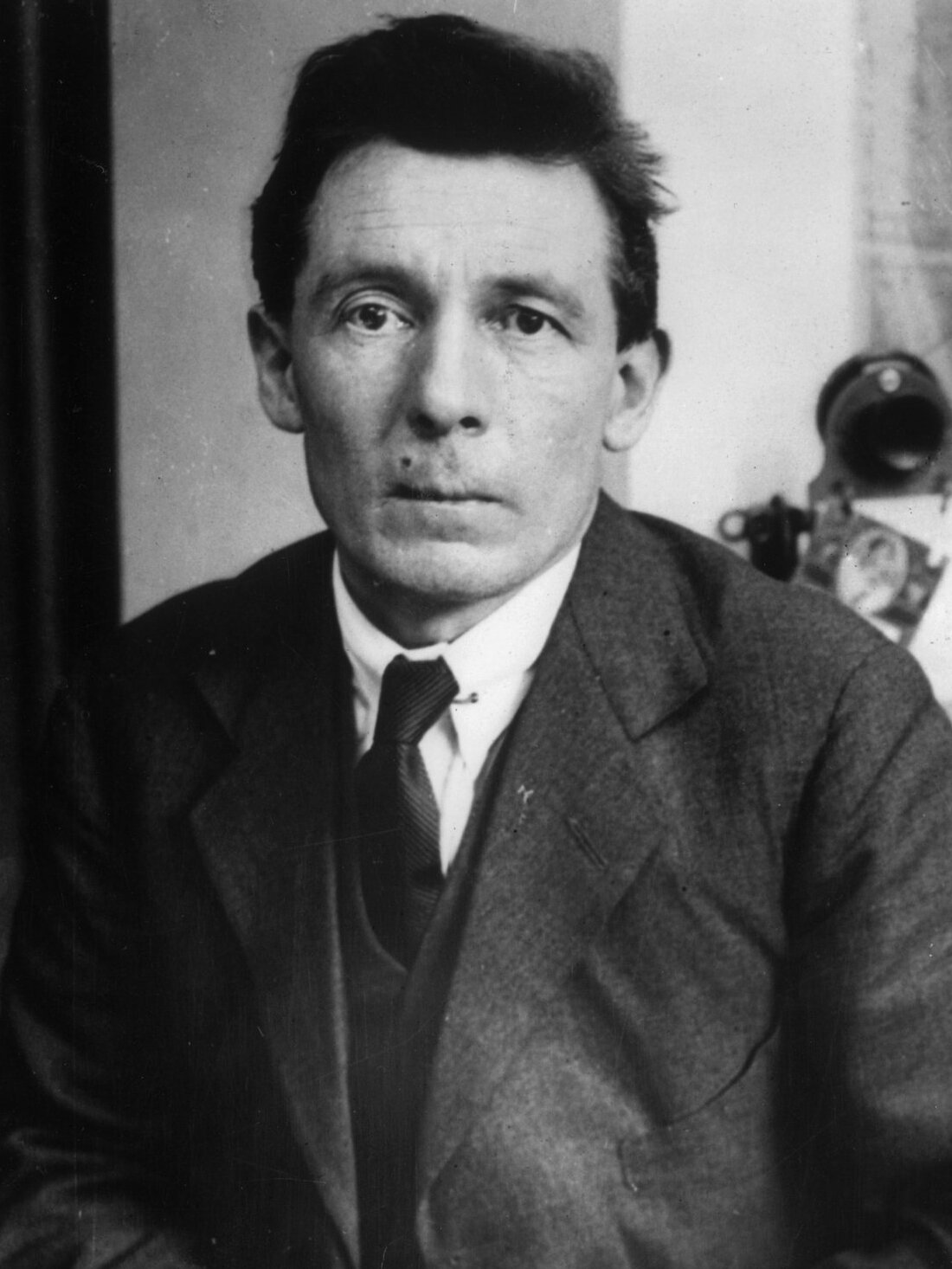
- Stack, c. 1920s

Minister for Home Affairs
- In office 22 August 1921 – 9 January 1922
- President: Éamon de Valera
- Preceded by: Arthur Griffith
- Succeeded by: Eamonn Duggan

Teachta Dála
- In office August 1923 – June 1927
- Constituency: Kerry
- In office May 1921 – August 1923
- Constituency: Kerry–Limerick West
- In office December 1918 – May 1921
- Constituency: Kerry West

Personal details
- Born: Augustine Mary Moore Stack; 7 December 1879 Tralee, County Kerry, Ireland
- Died: 27 April 1929 (aged 49) Dublin, Ireland
- Party: Sinn Féin
- Spouse: Winifred Cassidy (m. 1925)

Military service
- Allegiance: Irish Republican Brotherhood; Irish Volunteers; Irish Republican Army; Anti-Treaty IRA
- Years of service: 1916–1922
- Battles/wars: Easter Rising; Irish War of Independence; Irish Civil War
- Gaelic games career
- Sport: Gaelic football
Club
- Years: Club
- Tralee
Inter-county
- Years: County
- 1896–1905: Kerry
Inter-county titles
- All-Irelands: 1

British Army military intelligence file for Austin Stack

Augustine Mary Moore Stack (7 December 1879 – 27 April 1929) was an Irish republican and politician who served as Minister for Home Affairs from 1921 to 1922. He was a Teachta Dála (TD) from 1918 to 1927.

== Early life ==
Stack was born in Ballymullen, Tralee, County Kerry, to William Stack, an attorney's clerk, and Nanette O'Neill. He was educated at the Christian Brothers School in Tralee. At the age of fourteen, he left school and became a clerk in a solicitor's office. A gifted Gaelic footballer, he captained the Kerry team to All-Ireland SFC victory in 1904. He also served as President of the Gaelic Athletic Association's Kerry County Board.

== Activism ==
He became politically active in 1908 when he joined the Irish Republican Brotherhood. In 1916, as commandant of the Kerry Brigade of the Irish Volunteers, he made preparations for the landing of arms by Roger Casement. He was made aware that Casement was arrested on Easter Saturday and was being held in Tralee. He made no attempt to rescue him from Ballymullen Barracks.

Stack was arrested and sentenced to death for his involvement in the Rising; however, this was later commuted to penal servitude for life. Imprisoned at HM Prison Dartmoor Stack was in the company of senior leaders of the rebellion: Éamon de Valera, Harry Boland and Thomas Ashe. Stack was a leader of Irish Republican prisoners and led several hunger strikes (including one at Dundalk Gaol) in resistance to being treated as criminals. He was released under general amnesty in June 1917 and was elected as an abstentionist Sinn Féin MP for Kerry West at the 1918 Westminster election, becoming a member of the 1st Dáil. He was elected unopposed as an abstentionist member of the House of Commons of Southern Ireland and a member of the 2nd Dáil as a Sinn Féin TD for Kerry–Limerick West at the 1921 elections.

Stack, as part of his role as Minister for Home Affairs, was responsible for the creation and administration of the Dáil Courts. These were courts run by IRA in parallel and opposition to the judicial system being run by the British government. The IRA and Sinn Féin was highly successful in both getting the civilian population of Ireland to use the courts and accept their rulings. The success of this initiative gave Sinn Féin a large boost in legitimacy and supported their goals in creating a "counter-state" within Ireland as part of their overarching goals in the War of Independence. Frank O'Connor, later a republican colleague in the civil war, considered him a failure as home affairs minister for an unrealistic attitude to overseeing a ministry in constrained circumstances – a complaint many of his cabinet colleagues made.

He opposed the 1921 Anglo-Irish Treaty and took part in the subsequent Civil War. In the shadow republican government established in late 1922 he was appointed minister of finance. He remained secretary of Sinn Féin. He was captured on 14 April 1923 and participated in the 1923 Irish hunger strikes for forty-one days before being released along with approximately 15,000 Sinn Féin and IRA prisoners in July 1924.

== Dáil ==
He was elected to the 3rd Dáil at the 1922 general election and subsequent elections as an Anti-Treaty Sinn Féin TD for the Kerry constituency. When Éamon de Valera founded Fianna Fáil in 1926, Stack remained with Sinn Féin being re-elected to the Dáil at the June 1927 general election. He did not contest the September 1927 general election.

== Personal life ==
In 1925, he married Winifred (Una) Gordon née Cassidy (died 1950), the widow of a Royal Irish Constabulary district inspector, Patrick Gordon (1870–1912).

Stack's health never recovered after his hunger strike and he died in a Dublin hospital on 27 April 1929, aged 49.

== Honours ==
At the time of his death a pamphlet was issued to commemorate his dedication to the cause of Irish freedom: "...Austin Stack, a man who bore and dared and suffered, remaining through it all and at the worst, the captain of his own soul...The force of England, of the English Slave State, might try coercion, as they did in many times. It made no difference. He went his way, suffered their will, and stood his ground doggedly, smiling now and again. His determination out-stood theirs because it had a deeper foundation and a higher aim. Compromise, submission, the slave marks, did not and could not exist for him as touching himself, or the Cause for which he worked and fought, lived and died."

Austin Stack Park in his home town of Tralee, one of the Gaelic Athletic Association's stadiums, is named in his honour, as is the Austin Stacks GAA Hurling and Gaelic football club.

Parliament of the United Kingdom
Preceded by Thomas O'Donnell	Member of Parliament for Kerry West; 1918–1922	Constituency abolished
Oireachtas
New constituency	Teachta Dála for Kerry West; 1918–1921	Constituency abolished
Political offices
Preceded by Arthur Griffith	Minister for Home Affairs; 1921–1922	Succeeded by Eamonn Duggan

Dáil	Election	Deputy (Party)	Deputy (Party)	Deputy (Party)	Deputy (Party)	Deputy (Party)	Deputy (Party)	Deputy (Party)	Deputy (Party)
2nd	1921	Piaras Béaslaí (SF)	James Crowley (SF)	Fionán Lynch (SF)	Patrick Cahill (SF)	Con Collins (SF)	Thomas O'Donoghue (SF)	Edmund Roche (SF)	Austin Stack (SF)
3rd	1922	Piaras Béaslaí (PT-SF)	James Crowley (PT-SF)	Fionán Lynch (PT-SF)	Patrick Cahill (AT-SF)	Con Collins (AT-SF)	Thomas O'Donoghue (AT-SF)	Edmund Roche (AT-SF)	Austin Stack (AT-SF)
4th	1923	Constituency abolished. See Kerry and Limerick							

Dáil	Election	Deputy (Party)	Deputy (Party)	Deputy (Party)	Deputy (Party)	Deputy (Party)	Deputy (Party)	Deputy (Party)
4th	1923	Tom McEllistrim (Rep)	Austin Stack (Rep)	Patrick Cahill (Rep)	Thomas O'Donoghue (Rep)	James Crowley (CnaG)	Fionán Lynch (CnaG)	John O'Sullivan (CnaG)
5th	1927 (Jun)	Tom McEllistrim (FF)	Austin Stack (SF)	William O'Leary (FF)	Thomas O'Reilly (FF)	James Crowley (CnaG)	Fionán Lynch (CnaG)	John O'Sullivan (CnaG)
6th	1927 (Sep)	Tom McEllistrim (FF)	Frederick Crowley (FF)	William O'Leary (FF)	Thomas O'Reilly (FF)	James Crowley (CnaG)	Fionán Lynch (CnaG)	John O'Sullivan (CnaG)
7th	1932	Tom McEllistrim (FF)	Frederick Crowley (FF)	John Flynn (FF)	Thomas O'Reilly (FF)	Eamon Kissane (FF)	Fionán Lynch (CnaG)	John O'Sullivan (CnaG)
8th	1933	Tom McEllistrim (FF)	Frederick Crowley (FF)	John Flynn (FF)	Denis Daly (FF)	Eamon Kissane (FF)	Fionán Lynch (CnaG)	John O'Sullivan (CnaG)
9th	1937	Constituency abolished. See Kerry North and Kerry South						

Dáil	Election	Deputy (Party)	Deputy (Party)	Deputy (Party)	Deputy (Party)	Deputy (Party)
32nd	2016	Martin Ferris (SF)	Michael Healy-Rae (Ind.)	Danny Healy-Rae (Ind.)	John Brassil (FF)	Brendan Griffin (FG)
33rd	2020	Pa Daly (SF)	Michael Healy-Rae (Ind.)	Danny Healy-Rae (Ind.)	Norma Foley (FF)	Brendan Griffin (FG)
34th	2024	Pa Daly (SF)	Michael Healy-Rae (Ind.)	Danny Healy-Rae (Ind.)	Norma Foley (FF)	Michael Cahill (FF)
