= List of Wexford inter-county footballers =

This is a very incomplete list of Gaelic footballers who have played at senior level for the Wexford county team.

== List of players ==
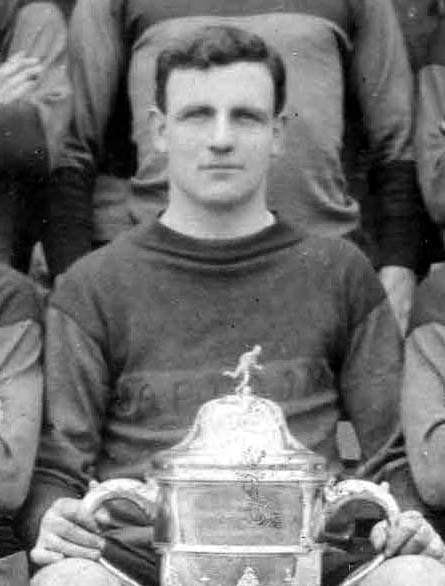
Seán O'Kennedy

=== A–L ===
- Ben Brosnan: From 2011 (in championship), in 2024, he equalled Brian Malone's 174 appearances for Wexford
- Jim Byrne
- Scott Doran: 14 years, from 1992, scorer of 25–174 during 103 competitive appearances
- Mattie Forde: All Star, Wexford's top scorer in National Football League history, finishing his career with 29–299 (386) in that competition
- John Hegarty: From 1995 until 2006, scored 21–125 in 105 appearances
- Bill Hodgins: Winner of 1917 and 1918 All-Ireland SFC titles

=== M ===
- Brian Malone: Former record appearance holder, breaking Colm Morris's record of 164 with his 165th appearance in 2020 his total equalled in 2024 by Ben Brosnan's 174th appearance
- Colm Morris: From 1999, former appearance record holder, his total broken in 2020 by Brian Malone's 165th appearance
- Anthony Masterson: Until 2016
- David Murphy & Redmond Barry: Until 2013, with 180 appearances Murphy had more appearances for Wexford than any other player when he retired

=== N–Z ===
- Seán O'Kennedy: Captained Wexford to the 1915, 1916 and 1917 All-Ireland SFC titles
- Toddy Pierse: From 1918
- Shane Roche
