= 1916 All-Ireland Senior Football Championship final =

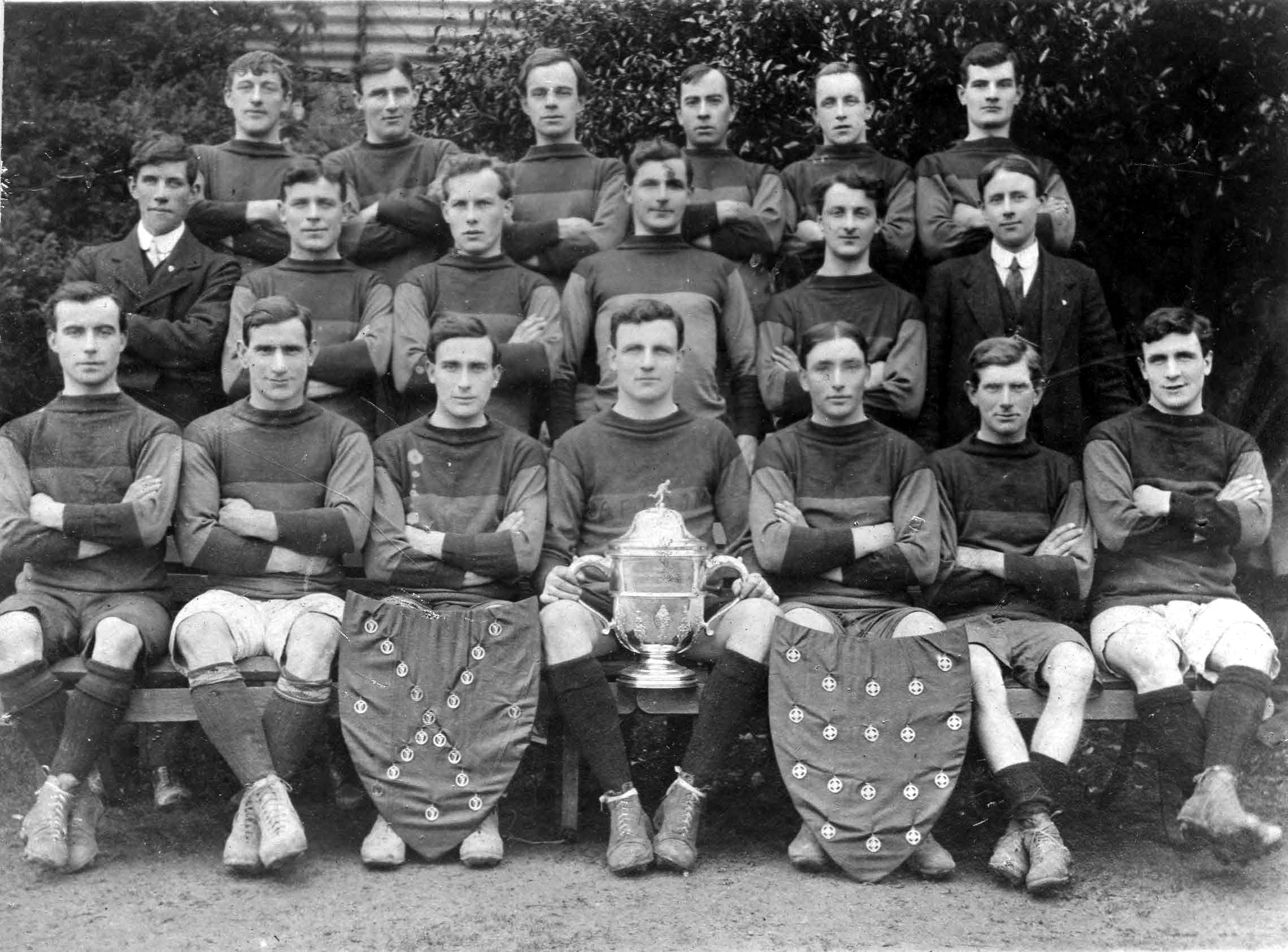
- Wexford, champions
- Event: 1916 All-Ireland Senior Football Championship
Wexford	Mayo
3–4 (13)	1–2 (5)
- Date: 17 December 1916
- Venue: Croke Park, Dublin
- Referee: Pat Dunphy (Laois)
- Attendance: 3,000
- Weather: cold, wintry

The 1916 All-Ireland Senior Football Championship final was the 29th All-Ireland Final and the deciding match of the 1916 All-Ireland Senior Football Championship, an inter-county Gaelic football tournament for the top teams in Ireland.

== Match ==
=== Summary ===
The Croke Park pitch frosted over overnight, but was pronounced playable. Mayo were the first Connacht team to reach the final, but Wexford won by a wide margin. The low attendance was due to the lack of special trains under the martial law introduced after the Easter Rising.

It was the second of four All-Ireland SFC titles won by Wexford in the 1910s.

Seán O'Kennedy, whose brother Gus played at corner-forward, captained Wexford.

=== Details ===
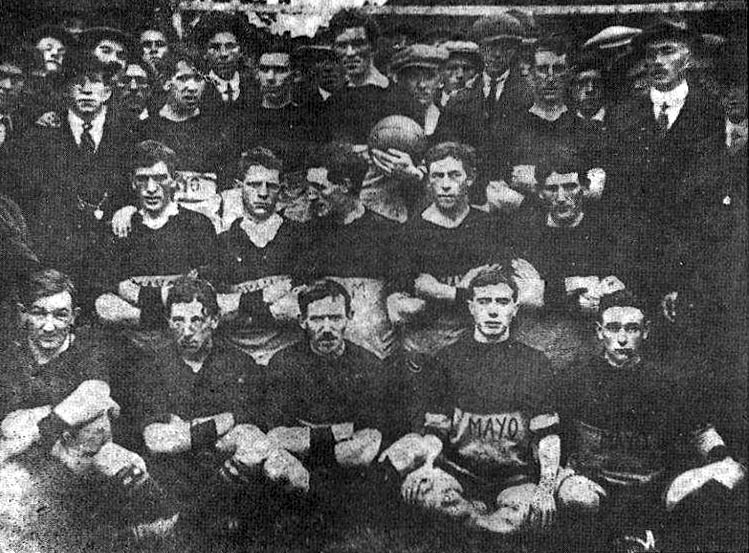
Mayo team, runners-up

17 December 1916
Final

Wexford	3–4 – 1–2	Mayo

Croke Park, Dublin
Referee: Pat Dunphy (Laois)
Attendance: 3,000

Wexford	Mayo

==== Wexford ====
- Seán O'Kennedy (c)
- Tom McGrath (goal)
- Paddy Mackey
- Edmund Wheeler
- Jim Byrne
- Tom Murphy
- Tom Mernagh
- Martin Howlett
- Frank Furlong
- Tom Doyle
- John Crowley
- Dick Reynolds
- J. Wall
- Aidan Doyle
- Gus O'Kennedy
