= 1917 All-Ireland Senior Football Championship final =

- Event: 1917 All-Ireland Senior Football Championship
Wexford	Clare
0–9	0–5
- Date: 9 December 1917
- Venue: Croke Park, Dublin
- Referee: Pat Dunphy (Laois)
- Attendance: 6,500

The 1917 All-Ireland Senior Football Championship final was the thirtieth All-Ireland Final and the deciding match of the 1917 All-Ireland Senior Football Championship, an inter-county Gaelic football tournament for the top teams in Ireland.

== Match ==
=== Summary ===
Turlough "Tull" Considine, a dual star, was through on goal for Clare but was tripped up, while both teams had goals disallowed, so only points decided the game, Wexford winning nine to five.

It was the third of four All-Ireland SFC titles won by Wexford in the 1910s.

Seán O'Kennedy, whose brother Gus played at corner-forward, captained Wexford.

=== Details ===
9 December 1917
Final

Wexford	0–9 – 0–5	Clare

Croke Park, Dublin
Attendance: 6,500
Referee: Pat Dunphy (Laois)

==== Wexford Team ====
- Seán O'Kennedy (c)
- Gus O'Kennedy
- Paddy Mackey
- Aidan Doyle
- Tom Mernagh
- Tom McGrath (goal)
- Tom Murphy
- Bill Hodgins
- J. Quinn
- Jim Byrne
- John Crowley
- Frank Furlong
- Martin Howlett
- Tom Doyle
- Dick Reynolds
