= 2025 All-Ireland Senior Football Championship =

Irish annual Gaelic football championship

Championship details
- Dates: 5 April – 27 July 2025
- Teams: 33

All-Ireland Champions
- Winning team: Kerry (39th win)
- Captain: Gavin White
- Manager: Jack O'Connor

All-Ireland Finalists
- Losing team: Donegal
- Captain: Patrick McBrearty
- Manager: Jim McGuinness

Provincial Champions
- Munster: Kerry
- Leinster: Louth
- Ulster: Donegal
- Connacht: Galway

Championship statistics
- Top Scorer: David Clifford (8–62)

The 2025 All-Ireland Senior Football Championship (SFC) was the 139th edition of the Gaelic Athletic Association's premier inter-county Gaelic football tournament. Thirty-one of the thirty-two Irish counties took part. Kilkenny did not compete, but took part in the All-Ireland Junior Championship, while London and New York completed the lineup by entering the Connacht SFC.

Armagh the defending champion, would have been assured of a place in the All-Ireland round robin phase by a top 7 finish in the 2025 National Football League; in the event, Armagh qualified as an Ulster SFC finalist. Down, as winner of the 2024 Tailteann Cup, moved up to the All-Ireland championship round robin, regardless of provincial championship or National Football League position.

The final was played on 27 July 2025 at Croke Park in Dublin, between Ulster champions Donegal and Munster champions Kerry. Kerry won a 39th title, with a 1–26 to 0–19 win against Donegal in that game.

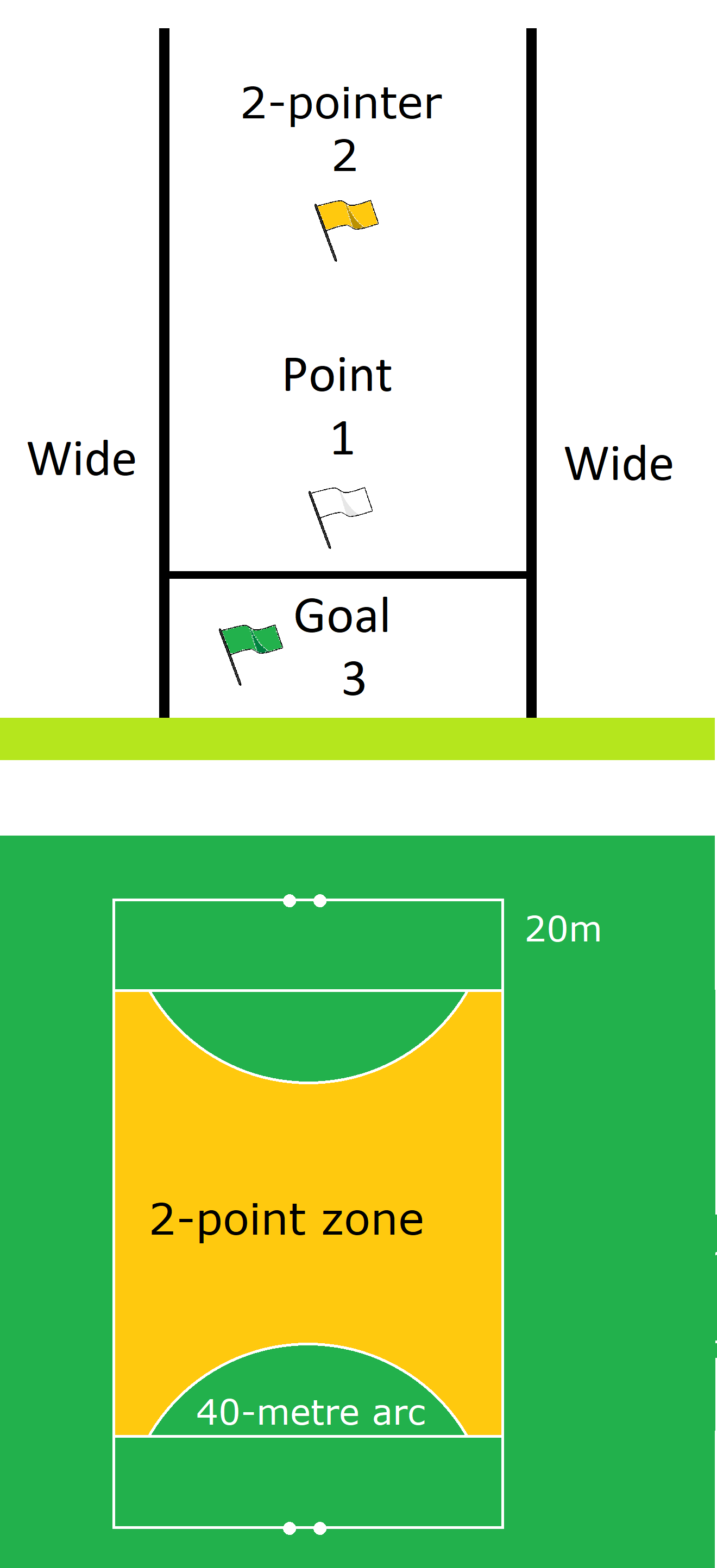
The new scoring system in Gaelic football – when the ball is kicked over the crossbar from outside the 20 m (22 yd) line and outside a 40 m (44 yd) arc, 2 points are scored.

The draws for the competition took place on 12 October 2024.

This was the first All-Ireland Football Championship to feature the new Football Review Committee (FRC) rule changes adopted in 2024, including the two-point shot for scoring outside the 40-metre arc.

== Format ==
=== Provincial Championships ===
Connacht, Leinster, Munster and Ulster each organised a provincial championship. All provincial matches were knock-out.

=== Group stage format ===
Sixteen teams progressed to the All-Ireland Championship round-robin:

- The four provincial champions
- The four beaten provincial finalists
- The 2024 Tailteann Cup winner (Down)
- The seven next-ranked teams, based on final position in the 2025 National Football League
  - Position was based on standing after promotion and relegation were applied, and after finals had been played; therefore, the top two teams in Division 2 outranked the bottom two teams in Division 1, and if the 2nd placed team in Division 2 had won the final, they were ranked above the 1st-place finisher who had lost the final.
  - If Down reached the Ulster final, an 8th team would have been chosen based on league position.
  - New York did not participate in the League, although London did.

The other 17 county teams competed in the 2025 Tailteann Cup. New York, by failing to reach the final of the Connacht SFC, joined the Tailteann Cup in the preliminary quarter-final stage, the remaining teams in the round-robin group stages.

In the All-Ireland Championship round-robin, 16 teams were drawn into four groups of four teams. Each team played the other in its group once, earning 2 points for a win and 1 for a draw. Each team played one home, one away, and one neutral fixture.

The top three in each group advanced to the knockout stages, first-place teams to the All-Ireland quarter-finals, and second and third-placed teams to the preliminary quarter-finals.

== Teams ==
Thirty-three counties competed in the All-Ireland Senior Football Championship: seven teams in the Connacht Senior Football Championship, eleven teams in the Leinster Senior Football Championship, six teams in the Munster Senior Football Championship and nine teams in the Ulster Senior Football Championship.

County	Last Provincial title	Last Championship title	Position in 2024 Championship	Current Championship
Antrim	1951	—	Tailteann Cup semi-finals (19th–20th)	Ulster Senior Football Championship
Armagh	2008	2024	All-Ireland champions (1st)	Ulster Senior Football Championship
Carlow	1944	—	Tailteann Cup group stage (29th–33rd)	Leinster Senior Football Championship
Cavan	2020	1952	All-Ireland group stage (13th–16th)	Ulster Senior Football Championship
Clare	1992	—	All-Ireland group stage (13th–16th)	Munster Senior Football Championship
Cork	2012	2010	Preliminary quarter-finals (9th–12th)	Munster Senior Football Championship
Derry	2023	1993	Quarter-finals (5th–8th)	Ulster Senior Football Championship
Donegal	2024	2012	Semi-finals (3rd–4th)	Ulster Senior Football Championship
Down	1994	1994	Tailteann Cup winners (17th)	Ulster Senior Football Championship
Dublin	2024	2023	Quarter-finals (5th–8th)	Leinster Senior Football Championship
Fermanagh	—	—	Tailteann Cup quarter-finals (21st–24th)	Ulster Senior Football Championship
Galway	2024	2001	Finalists (2nd)	Connacht Senior Football Championship
Kerry	2024	2022	Semi-finals (3rd–4th)	Munster Senior Football Championship
Kildare	2000	1928	Tailteann Cup quarter-finals (21st–24th)	Leinster Senior Football Championship
Laois	2003	—	Tailteann Cup finalists (18th)	Leinster Senior Football Championship
Leitrim	1994	—	Tailteann Cup preliminary quarter-finals (25th–28th)	Connacht Senior Football Championship
Limerick	1896	1896	Tailteann Cup quarter-finals (21st–24th)	Munster Senior Football Championship
London	—	—	Tailteann Cup preliminary quarter-finals (25th–28th)	Connacht Senior Football Championship
Longford	1968	—	Tailteann Cup group stage (29th–33rd)	Leinster Senior Football Championship
Louth	1957	1957	Quarter-finals (5th–8th)	Leinster Senior Football Championship
Mayo	2021	1951	Preliminary quarter-finals (9th–12th)	Connacht Senior Football Championship
Meath	2010	1999	All-Ireland group stage (13th–16th)	Leinster Senior Football Championship
Monaghan	2015	—	Preliminary quarter-finals (9th–12th)	Ulster Senior Football Championship
New York	—	—	Tailteann Cup preliminary quarter-finals (25th–28th)	Connacht Senior Football Championship
Offaly	1997	1982	Tailteann Cup group stage (29th–33rd)	Leinster Senior Football Championship
Roscommon	2019	1944	Quarter-finals (5th–8th)	Connacht Senior Football Championship
Sligo	2007	—	Tailteann Cup semi-finals (19th–20th)	Connacht Senior Football Championship
Tipperary	2020	1920	Tailteann Cup preliminary quarter-finals (25th–28th)	Munster Senior Football Championship
Tyrone	2021	2021	Preliminary quarter-finals (9th–12th)	Ulster Senior Football Championship
Waterford	1898	—	Tailteann Cup group stage (29th–33rd)	Munster Senior Football Championship
Westmeath	2004	—	All-Ireland group stage (13th–16th)	Leinster Senior Football Championship
Wexford	1945	1918	Tailteann Cup group stage (29th–33rd)	Leinster Senior Football Championship
Wicklow	—	—	Tailteann Cup quarter-finals (21st–24th)	Leinster Senior Football Championship

== Provincial championships ==
=== Connacht Senior Football Championship ===
Quarter-finals
5 April, Ruislip
London	0-13
Roscommon	2-26
6 April, New York City
New York	0-20
Galway	3-28
6 April, Castlebar
Mayo	2-20
Sligo	2-17

Semi-finals
20 April, Galway
Roscommon	0-18
Galway	1-24
19 April, Carrick-on-Shannon
Mayo	0-20
Leitrim	0-13

Final
4 May, Castlebar
Galway	1-17
Mayo	1-15

==== Quarter-finals ====
5 April 2025 Quarter-final	London	0–13 (13) – (32) 2–26	Roscommon	Ruislip
		(HT: 0–10 – 1–10)		Venue: McGovern Park
	Pts: Eoin Walsh 1, Liam Gallagher 2 (1tp), Daniel Clarke 2 (1tp), Kristian Healy 1, Ciaran Diver 3 (1f), Shay Rafter 4 (2fs)	Report	Gls: Diarmuid Murtagh 1, Ciaráin Murtagh 1 Pts: Ruaidhrí Fallon 1, Dylan Ruane 2, Eddie Nolan 1, Keith Doyle 1, Enda Smith 2, Ben O’Carroll 7 (1tp, 1f), Diarmuid Murtagh 1, Cian McKeon 3, Ciaráin Murtagh 5 (1tp), Cathal Heneghan 2 (1tp)	Referee: T. Murphy (Galway)

6 April 2025 Quarter-final	New York	0–20 (20) – (37) 3–28	Galway	New York City
		(HT: 0–12 – 1–12)		Venue: Gaelic Park
	Pts: C O'Dea 1, J Walsh 2 (1tp), K Murphy 1, F O’Reilly 7 (3tpfs, 1f), J Robinson 5, B O’Regan 4 (2fs, 1tpf)	Report	Gls: C Hernon 1, M Tierney 2 Pts: C Flaherty 2 (1tp), K Molloy 1, S Kelly 2, M Tierney 4 (1f, 1 tpf), J Maher 1, M Thompson 3, C McDaid 1, D O’Flaherty 2, Brian Mannion 1, R Finnerty 6 (3fs), F Ó Laoi 1, P Conroy 2 (1tpf), L Ó Conghaile 2	Referee: Joe McQuillan (Cavan); Attendance: ~6,000

6 April 2025 Quarter-final	Mayo	2–20 (26) – (23) 2–17	Sligo	Castlebar
		(HT: 1–8 – 0–8)		Venue: MacHale Park
	Gls: Aidan O’Shea 1, Ryan O’Donoghue 1 Pts: Enda Hession 1, Jack Carney 2, Matthew Ruane 1, David Neary 1, Darren McHale 4, Aidan O’Shea 3, Dylan Thornton 1, Ryan O’Donoghue 4 (4f), Fergal Boland 2, Conal Dawson 1	Report	Gls: Luke Towey 1, Cian Lally 1 Pts: Cian Lally 1, David Quinn 1, Alan McLoughlin 5 (1tp,1f), Niall Murphy 7 (1tp), Pat Spillane 2, Oisin Flynn 1	Referee: Noel Mooney (Cavan); Attendance: 9,179

==== Semi-finals ====
19 April 2025 Semi-final	Leitrim	0–13 (13) – (20) 0–20	Mayo	Carrick On Shannon
		(HT: 0–7 – 0–8)		Venue: Páirc Seán Mac Diarmada
	Pts: B McNulty 0–8 (2tp), D Cox 0–2, T Prior 0–2, R O'Rourke 0–1 (f)	Report	Pts: R O'Donoghoe 0–9 (5f), J Carney 0–2, J Flynn 0–2, P Towey 0–2, M Ruane 0–1, D McHale 0–1, A O'Shea 0–1 (f), S Coen 0–1, C Reape 0–1 ('45)	Attendance: 4,531

20 April 2025 Semi-final	Galway	1–24 (27) – (18) 0–18	Roscommon	Galway
		(HT: 1–12 – 0–7)		Venue: Pearse Stadium
	Gls: M Tierney 1 Pts: R Finnerty 0–8 (2f), P Conroy 0–5 (2tp), C McDaid 0–3, M Tierney 0–3 (1m, 1tpf), J Maher 0–2, D McHugh 0–2, L Silke 0–1	Report	Pts: D Murtagh 0–5 (3f, 1tp), C Murtagh 0–4 (1tp), B O'Carroll 0–3, D Smith 0–2 (tp), C Neary 0–1, R Fallon 0–1 (1m), S Killoran 0–1, S Lambe 0–1	Attendance: 10,573

==== Final ====
4 May 2025 Final	Mayo	1–15 (18) – (20) 1–17	Galway	Castlebar
		(HT: 1–3 – 1–11)		Venue: MacHale Park
	Gls: D McHale 1 Pts: R O'Donoghue 0–9 (1tp, 6f), D McHale 0–2, M Ruane 0–2 (tp), D Neary 0–1, C Reape 0–1 ('45)	Report	Gls: M Tierney 1 (pen); Pts: P Conroy 0–7 (2tp, 1tpf), R Finnerty 0–4 (3f), C McDaid 0–2, S Kelly 0–1, M Thompson 0–1, L O'Conghaile 0–1	Referee: Paddy Neilan (Roscommon); Attendance: 27,137

=== Leinster Senior Football Championship ===
Preliminary round
5 April, Wexford
Wexford	2-11
Laois	2-21
6 April, Longford
Longford	1-20
Wicklow	2-23
6 April, Navan
Meath	1-30
Carlow	0-19

Quarter-finals
12 April, Newbridge
Kildare	2-17
Westmeath	0-21
13 April, Newbridge
Louth	2-16
Laois	1-17
13 April, Newbridge
Dublin	2-21
Wicklow	0-18
13 April, Navan
Offaly	0-21
Meath	1-25

Semi-finals
27 April, Tullamore
Kildare	0-18
Louth	1-18
27 April, Portlaoise
Dublin	1-16
Meath	0-23

Final
11 May, Dublin
Louth	3-14
Meath	1-18

==== Preliminary round ====
5 April 2025 Preliminary round	Wexford	2–11 (17) – (27) 2–21	Laois	Wexford
		(HT: 0–6 – 2–12)		Venue: Wexford Park
	Gls: M Kinsella 1, S Ryan 1 Pts: M Rossiter 0–5 (3f), K O'Grady 0–2, D Brooks 0–2 (tpf), E Porter 0–1, N Hughes 0–1	Report	Gls: P O'Sullivan 1, D O'Reilly 1 Pts: M Barry 0–7 (2f), R Coffey 0–6 (1tp, 1tpf), P Kirwan 0–3, K Roche 0–1 ('45), T Collins 0–1, D O'Reilly 0–1, B Byrne 0–1, J Kelly 0–1

6 April 2025 Preliminary round	Meath	1–30 (33) – (19) 0–19	Carlow	Navan
		(HT: 0–22 – 0–5)		Venue: Pairc Tailteann
	Gls: R Kinsella 1 Pts: E Frayne 0–7 (1tp, 1tpf, 2f), R Kinsella 0–5 (1tp), M Costello 0–4 (2f), J Flynn 0–3 (1tp), K Curtis 0–2 (tp), J Kinlough 0–2, C Duke 0–2, D Moriarty 0–2, C Caulfield 0–1, B Menton 0–1, J Scully 0–1	Report	Pts: C Doyle 0–5 (1tp, 1tpf, 1'45), K Murphy 0–4 (1tpf, 1f), N Hickey 0–3 (1tp), C Crowley 0–3 (1f, 1m), C Moran 0–2 (tp), R Dunphy 0–1, P McDonnell 0–1	Attendance: 3,347

6 April 2025 Preliminary round	Longford	1–20 (23) – (29) 2–23 (a.e.t.)	Wicklow	Longford
		(HT: 0–12 – 0–8) (FT: 1–15 – 1–15)		Venue: Pearse Park
	Gls: D Reynold 1 Pts: M Carey 0–7 (1tpf, 1tp, 2f), J Matthews 0–4 (2f), D Farrell 0–3 (1tpf), O Kenny 0–3 (1tp), J Moran 0–1, A Farrell 0–1, C McCabe 0–1 (m)	Report	Gls: P O'Toole 1, K Quinn 1 Pts: O McGraynor 0–7 (1tp, 1f), K Quinn 0–5 (4f), D Healy 0–3 (1tp), P Keane 0–2, J Prendergast 0–1, L O'Neill 0–1, J Paul 0–1 (1'45), P O'Toole 0–1, C O'Brien 0–1, M Jackson 0–1	Attendance: ~1,000

==== Quarter-finals ====
12 April 2025 Quarter-final	Kildare	2–17 (23) – (21) 0–21	Westmeath	Newbridge
19:00 IST (UTC+1)		(HT: 1-8 - 0-12)		Venue: St Conleth's Park
	Gls: A Beirne 1, D Hyland 1 Pts: A Beirne 0-5 (3f), D Hyland 0-2 (tp), B McCormack 0-2, B McLoughlin 0-2 (tp), R Sinkey 0-2, D Kirwan 0-1, C Bolton 0-1, N Kelly 0-1, T Gill 0-1	Report	Pts: L Loughlin 0-11 (1tp, 1tpf, 1f), D McCartan 0–3, B Cooney 0–2, R Forde 0–2, R Connelllan 0–1, K O'Sullivan 0–1, J Gonoud 0–1	Referee: David Gough (Meath); Attendance: ~7,000

13 April 2025 Quarter-final	Wicklow	0–18 (18) – (27) 2–21	Dublin	Aughrim
		(HT: 0–11 – 2–9)		Venue: Aughrim Park
	Pts: O McGraynor 0–5 (1tp, 1f), D Healy 0–4 (1tp), K Quinn 0–3 (1tp), M Kenny 0–2 (tp), D Fee 0–1, P O'Keane 0–1, J Prednergast 0–1, P O'Toole 0–1	Report	Gls: C O'Callaghan 1, N Skully 1 Pts: C O'Callaghan 0–7 (1f, 1tp), T Lahiff 0–3 (1tp), C Kilkenny 0–3, C Basquel 0–2, S Bugler 0–2, G McEneaney 0–1, P Small 0–1, K McGinnis 0–1, N Skully 0–1	Attendance: ~6,600

13 April 2025 Quarter-final	Meath	1–25 (28) – (21) 0–21	Offaly	Navan
		(HT: 0–5 – 0–15)		Venue: Pairc Tailteann
	Gls: J Conlon 1 Pts: M Costello 0–9 (2f, 1tp, 2tpf), C Duke (2tp), E Frayne 0–3 (1f, 1tpf), J Flynn 0–2 (tp), B Hogan 0–2 (tpf), J Conlon 0–2, S Coffey 0–1, B Menton 0–1, A Lynch 0–1	Report	Pts: K O'Neill 0–6 (2tp, 1f), P Dunican 0–5 (1'45, 2tpf), D Hyland 0–4 (3f), K Higgins 0–2(tp), S Tierney 0–2, J Byrant 0–1, C Egan 0–1	Attendance: 5,731

13 April 2025 Quarter-final	Louth	2–16 (22) – (17) 0–17	Laois	Newbridge
		(HT: 0–8 – 0–9)		Venue: St Conleth's Park
	Gls: C Byrne 1, R Burns 1 (pen); Pts: R Burns 0–4 (1'45, 1f), C Byrne 0–3, C Downey 0–3, P Lynch 0–1, A McDonnell 0–1, K McArdle 0–1, T Durnin 0–1, C Lennon 0–1, D McKeown 0–1	Report	Pts: M Barry 0–8 (4f), R Coffey 0–3 (1f), D Larkin 0–2, D O'Reilly 0–1, K Swayne 0–1, N Corbett 0–1, B Byrne 0–1

==== Semi-finals ====
27 April 2025 Semi-final	Meath	0–23 (23) – (19) 1–16	Dublin	Portlaoise
		(HT: 0–17 – 0–5)		Venue: O'Moore Park
	Pts: E Frayne 0–11 (1tp, 1tpf, 5f), J Conlon 0–5, K Curtis 0–3 (1tp), B Menton 0–2 (tp), M Costello 0–1, A Lynch 0–1	Report	Gls: C Costello 1 Pts: C O'Callaghan 0–6 (3f, 1tp), P Small 0–5, C Basquel 0–3 (1tp), C Costello 0–1, L O'Dell 0–1	Attendance: 10,126

27 April 2025 Semi-final	Kildare	0–18 (18) – (21) 1–18	Louth	Tullamore
		(HT: 0–10 – 1–11)		Venue: O'Connor Park
	Pts: A Beirne 0–6 (2f), D Kirwan 0–5 (1f), C Dalton 0–2, K Feely 0–1, R Burke 0–1, R Sinkey 0–1, B McLoughlin 0–1, C Bolton 0–1	Report	Gls: C McKeever 1 Pts: S Mulroy 0–7 (2f, 1tp, 1tpf), C Lennon 0–4, R Burns 0–3, T Durnin 0–2 (tp), D McKenny 0–1, K McArdle 0–1	Attendance: 6,670

==== Final ====
11 May 2025 Final	Meath	1–18 (21) – (23) 3–14	Louth	Dublin
4:15 p.m.		(HT: 0–13 – 3–3)		Venue: Croke Park
	Gls: M Costello 1 Pts: E Frayne 0–4 (3f), B Hogan 0–4 (2tpf), R Kinsella 0–4 (1tp), D Keogan 0–1, S Coffey 0–1, K Curtis 0–1, J Conlon 0–1, J Morris 0–1	Report	Gls: S Mulroy 1 (pen), R Burns 1, C Lennon 1 Pts: S Mulroy 0–7 (2f, 1tpf, 1'45), R Burns 0–3 (1tp), C Lennon 0–1, B Duffy 0–1, C Downey 0–1, C Grimes 0–1	Referee: Martin NcNally (Monaghan); Attendance: 65,786

=== Munster Senior Football Championship ===
Quarter-finals
Tipperary	1-22
Waterford	1-19
5 April, Limerick
Cork	0-24
Limerick	0-13

Semi-finals
19 April, Ennis
Tipperary	1-15
Clare	2-18
19 April, Cork
Cork	1-25
Kerry	3-21

Final
4 May, Killarney
Clare	0-21
Kerry	4-20

==== Quarter-finals ====
5 April 2025 Quarter-final	Cork	0–24 (24) – (13) 0–13	Limerick	Limerick
		(HT: 0–16 – 0–7)		Venue: Gaelic Grounds
	Pts: Brian O’Driscoll 6 (2tp), Matty Taylor 1, Colm O’Callaghan 2, Paul Walsh 2, Seán McDonnell 1, Mark Cronin 6 (2tpf, 2f), Brian Hurley 4 (1f, 1tpf), Chris Óg Jones 1, Cathail O’Mahony 1	Report	Pts: Colm McSweeney 1, Paul Maher 1, Emmett Rigter 2 (1tpf), James Naughton 7 (1f, 2tpf), Peter Nash 2 (1f)	Referee: Derek O'Mahoney (Tipperary); Attendance: 2,042

5 April 2025 Quarter-final	Tipperary	1–22 (25) – (22) 1–19	Waterford	Thurles
		(HT: 1–13 – 0–8)		Venue: Semple Stadium
	Gls: S O’Brien 1 Pts: P Feehan 1, M Freaney 4 (1tp), C Smith 6 (2fs), S O’Brien 8 (2tpf, 1tp, 1 '45)		Gls: A Dunwoody 1 Pts: L Fennell 1, C Murray 5 (1tp), James Power 3 (1tp), J Curry 6 (4fs, 1 '45), A Dunwoody 2	Referee: Fergal Kelly (Longford); Attendance: 1,017

==== Semi-finals ====
19 April 2025 Semi-final	Clare	2-18 (24) – (18) 1–15	Tipperary	Ennis
		(HT: 1–8 – 0–9)		Venue: Cusack Park
	Gls: M McInerney (2). Pts: M McInerney 5, 2 frees, 1 45); E McMahon (0–4); E Cleary (0–3, 1 free); K Sexton, A Griffin (2 each); C Downes, D Walsh (1 each).	Report	Gls: S O’Connor (1). Pts: S O’Connor (2, 0–1 free); D Brennan (4, 1tp); C Smith (3, 2 frees); P Feehan (tp), S O’Brien (tp) (2 each); M Russell, M Freaney (1 each).	Attendance: 2,893

19 April 2025 Semi-final	Kerry	3–21 (30) – (28) 1–25 (a.e.t.)	Cork	Cork
		(HT: 0–11 – 0–9) (FT: 2–17 – 1–20)		Venue: Páirc Uí Chaoimh
	Gls: P Geaney 1, S O’Shea 1 & J O’Connor 1, Pts: D Clifford 9 (2p, 1f), P Geaney 3, S O’Shea J O’Connor 1 each,	Report	Gls: C Og Jones 1. Pts: B O’Driscoll 5 (2 2p), C Og Jones 3, S McDonnell 3 (2p), B Hurley 3 (2pf), M Cronin 3 (1f, 1 ’45’), E McSweeney 3 (2p), C O’Mahony 2 (2p), I Maguire 1, R Deane 1 & C Cahalane 0–1.	Attendance: 14,358

==== Final ====
4 May 2025 Final	Kerry	4–20 (32) – (21) 0–21	Clare	Killarney
		(HT: 4–10 – 0–7)		Venue: Fitzgerald Stadium
	Gls: D Clifford 2 (2 pens), B D O'Sullivan 1, M Burns 1 Pts: S O'Shea 0–8 (1tp, 1tpf, 2f), D Clifford 0–5 (1f), P Geaney 0–4 (1f), D Geaney 0–2, B D O'Sullivan 0–1	Report	Pts: E McMahon 0–8 (2tpf, 3f), M McInerney 0–6 (2f, 1'45), B McNamara 0–2, K Sexton 0–2, D Walsh 0–1, A Griffin 0–1, M Doherty 0–1	Referee: Noel Mooney (Cavan); Attendance: 13,181

=== Ulster Senior Football Championship ===
Preliminary round

Quarter-finals

Semi-finals

Final

Antrim
1-23

Armagh
1-34

Armagh
0-23

Tyrone
0-22

Tyrone
1-24

Cavan
0-20

Armagh
0-28

Donegal
2-23 (a.e.t.)

Fermanagh
0-23

Down
2-19

Down
0-16

Donegal
1-25

Donegal
1-19

Derry
1-15

Monaghan
0-21

Donegal
0-23

==== Preliminary round ====
6 April 2025 Preliminary round	Donegal	1–25 (28) – (18) 1–15	Derry	Ballybofey
		(HT: 1–12 – 1–5)		Venue: MacCumhaill Park
	Gls: D O'Baoill 1 Pts: P McBrearty 0–7 (3f), D O'Baoill 0–4 (2tp), M Murphy 0–2 (1f), C Moore 0–2, P Mogan 0–2, S O'Donnell 0–2, C O'Donnell 0–2, R McHugh 0–1, F Roarty 0–1, O Gallen 0–1, J Brennan 0–1	Report	Gls: D Higgins 1 Pts: B Rogers 0–5 (2tp), S McGuigan 0–4 (4f), C Doherty 0–2 (tp), L Murray 0–2 (1f), N Toner 0–1, P McGrogan 0–1	Attendance: 15,023

==== Quarter-finals ====
12 April 2025 Quarter-final	Antrim	1–23 (26) – (37) 1–34	Armagh	Belfast
		(HT: 0–14 – 0–13)		Venue: Corrigan Park
	Gls: R McQuillan 1 Pts: P McBride 0–9 (3tp, 1f), R McQuillan 0–5 (1tp), D McEnhill 0–4 (1tp, 1tpf), M Byrne 0–3 (1'45), D M M Jordan 0–1, R Boyle 0–1, E Quinn 0–1	Report	Gls: T McCormack 1 Pts: R Grugan 0–8 (1tpf, 4f), O O'Neill 0–6 (3tpf), C O'Neill 0–4, R McQuillan 0–3, E Rafferty 0–3 (1tpf), G McCabe 0–2, C McConville 0–2, D McMullan 0–1, A Murnin 0–1, J Hall 0–1, A Forker 0–1, T McCormack 0–1, B McCambridge 0–1	Referee: Barry Cassidy; Attendance: ~4,000

13 April 2025 Quarter-final	Cavan	0–20 (20) – (27) 1–24	Tyrone	Omagh
		(HT: 0–4 – 0–14)		Venue: Healy Park
	Pts: D McVeety 0–8 (1tpf, 1tp, 1f), S McEvoy 0–4 (3f), C Madden 0–3 (1tpf), O Kiernan 0–3 (1tp), R Donohue 0–1, R O'Neill 0–1	Report	Gls: C Kilpatrick 1 Pts: D McCurry 0–7 (2f), R Canavan 0–4 (4f), K McGeary 0–3, C McShane 0–2, N Morgan 0–1 (1'45), P Teague 0–1, N Devlin 0–1, M McKernan 0–1, B Kennedy 0–1, A Donaghy 0–1, P Harte 0–1, C Daly 0–1	Attendance: 6,791

19 April 2025 Quarter-final	Down	2–19 (25) – (23) 0–23	Fermanagh	Enniskillen
		(HT: 0–11 – 0–8)		Venue: Brewster Park
	Gls: D Guinness 1, R McEvoy 1 Pts: D Guinness 0–4 (1tp), P Havern 0–4 (3f), D Magill 0–2, O Murdock 0–2, E Branagan 0–2, R McEvoy 0–1, J McGeough 0–1, C Doherty 0–1, R Burns 0–1 ('45), S Millar 0–1	Report	Pts: C Love 0–5, G Jones 0–4 (1f), S McNally 0–3 (3'45), L Cullen 0–2 (tp), J Cassidy 0–2, D McGurn 0–2, D McCusker 0–1, F O'Brien 0–1 (f), R Lyons 0–1, J L Ellis 0–1, R McCaffrey 0–1	Attendance: 4,157

20 April 2025 Quarter-final	Monaghan	0–21 (21) – (23) 0–23	Donegal	Clones
		(HT: 0–8 – 0–14)		Venue: St Tiernach's Park
	Pts: D Ward 0–6 (2tp), M Bannigan 0–5 (1tp, 2f), C McCarthy 0–3 (1tp), S Mooney 0–2, J McCarron 0–2 (1tp), G Mohan 0–1, R Beggan 0–1 ('45), R McAnespie 0–1	Report	Pts: C Thompson 0–5 (1tp, 1m), M Langan 0–4, P Mogan 0–4, M Murphy 0–3 (1tpf), D O Baoill 0–2, J Brennan 0–2, P McBrearty 0–1, O Gallen 0–1, F Roarty 0–1	Attendance: 16,120

==== Semi-finals ====
26 April 2025 Semi-final	Armagh	0–23 (23) – (22) 0–22	Tyrone	Clones
		(HT: 0–11 – 0–8)		Venue: St Tiernach's Park
	Pts: O Conaty 0–4, O O'Neill 0–3 (1tp), C O'Neill 0–3, R Grugan 0–3 (2f), A Murnin 0–2, R McQuillan 0–2, J Og Burns 0–2, B Crealey 0–1, E Rafferty 0–1, S Campbell 0–1, C Turbitt 0–1	Report	Pts: D McCurry 0–10 (4f, 1tpf), D Canavan 0–4 (2f), E McElholm 0–2, P Harte 0–2 (tp), C Kilpatrick 0–2 (tp), M McKernan 0–2 (tp)	Attendance: 21,288

27 April 2025 Semi-final	Down	0–16 (16) – (22) 1–19	Donegal	Clones
15:00 IST (UTC+1)		(HT: 0–7 – 1–12)		Venue: St Tiernach's Park
	Pts: P Havern 0–8 (1tp, 1tpf, 2f), E Branagan 0–3, D Magill 0–2, M Rooney 0–1, R McEvoy 0–1, D Guinness 0–1	Report	Gls: P McBrearty 1 Pts: P McBrearty 0–4 (1tpf, 2f), D O Baoill 0–3 (1tp), M Murphy 0–3 (1'45), C O'Donnell 0–2, M Langan 0–2 (tpf), S Patton 0–1 ('45), J Brennan 0–1, R McHugh 0–1, O Gallen 0–1, C Moore 0–1	Attendance: 9,221

==== Final ====
10 May 2025 Final	Armagh	0–28 (28) – (29) 2–23 (a.e.t.)	Donegal	Clones
17:15		(HT: 0–11 – 0–15) (FT: 0–23 – 1–20)		Venue: St Tiernach's Park
	Pts: O O'Neill 0–7 (1tp, 1tpf), O Conaty 0–6, E Rafferty 0–3 (1tpf, 1f), S Campbell 0–3, R McQuillan 0–3, J Duffy 0–2, C O'Neill 0–1, A Murnin 0–1, B Crealey 0–1, J Og Burns 0–1	Report	Gls: C Moore 1, H McFadden 1 Pts: O Gallen 0–4, C Thompson 0–4 (2tp), M Murphy 0–3, P McBrearty 0–3 (3f), M Langan 0–2, N O'Donnell 0–2, C Moore 0–1, C O'Donnell 0–1, D O Baoill 0–1, P Mogan 0–1, J McGee 0–1	Referee: Brendan Cawley (Kildare); Attendance: 28,788

=== Team allocation ===
Seven places in the All-Ireland group stage were allocated based on performance in the 2025 National Football League, as detailed below.

Key to colours
Qualified for round-robin phase	by reaching provincial final
Qualified for round-robin phase	by winning 2024 Tailteann Cup
Qualified for round-robin phase	based on NFL position
Compete in 2025 Tailteann Cup	

Position	Team
NFL champions	Kerry
NFL finalists	Mayo
3rd Div 1	Galway
4th Div 1	Donegal
5th Div 1	Dublin
6th Div 1	Armagh
Div 2 champions	Monaghan
Div 2 finalists	Roscommon
7th Div 1	Tyrone
8th Div 1	Derry
3rd Div 2	Meath
4th Div 2	Cavan
5th Div 2	Cork
6th Div 2	Louth
Div 3 champions	Offaly
Div 3 finalists	Kildare
7th Div 2	Down
8th Div 2	Westmeath
3rd Div 3	Clare
4th Div 3	Fermanagh
5th Div 3	Sligo
6th Div 3	Laois
Div 4 champions	Limerick
Div 4 finalists	Wexford
7th Div 3	Antrim
8th Div 3	Leitrim
3rd Div 4	Wicklow
4th Div 4	Carlow
5th Div 4	Tipperary
6th Div 4	Longford
7th Div 4	London
8th Div 4	Waterford
Did not enter	New York

=== Group stage draw ===
Number in brackets indicates ranking in the 2025 NFL.

==== Pot 1 ====
- Galway (3)
- Donegal (4)
- Kerry (1)
- Louth (14)

==== Pot 2 ====
- Armagh (6)
- Clare (19)
- Mayo (2)
- Meath (11)

==== Pot 3 ====
- Dublin (5)
- Monaghan (7)
- Roscommon (8)
- Tyrone (9)

==== Pot 4 ====
- Cavan (12)
- Cork (13)
- Derry (10)
- Down (17)

== All-Ireland Championship round robin stage ==
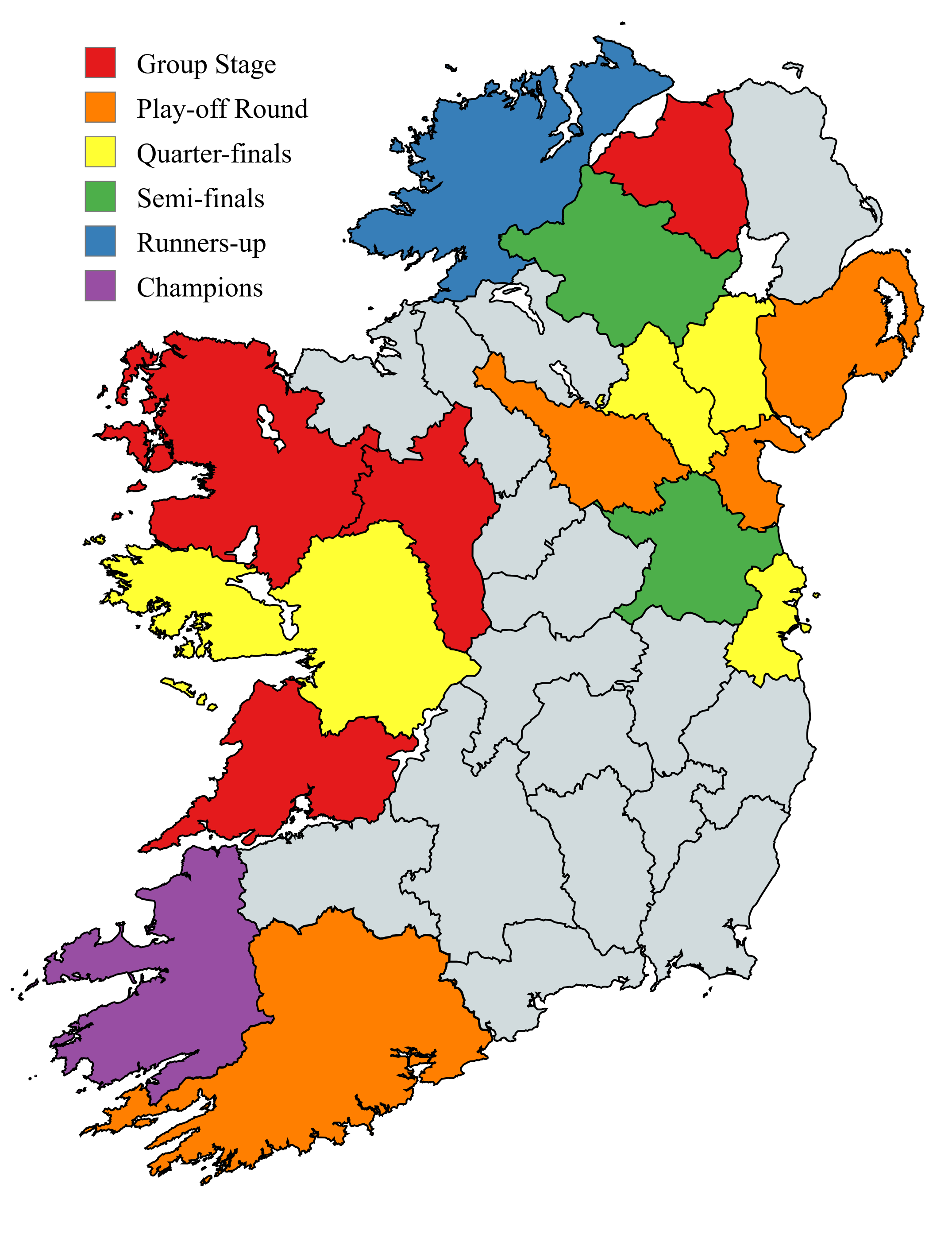
Results of counties participating in the 2025 All-Ireland Senior Football Championship

=== Group 1 ===
Pos	Team	Pld	W	D	L	PF	PA	PD	Pts	Qualification
1	Tyrone	3	2	0	1	70	61	+9	4 (Note: Tyrone are ranked ahead of Donegal as they won the head-to-head game between the teams.)	Advance to quarter-final
2	Donegal	3	2	0	1	74	57	+17	4	Advance to preliminary quarter-final
3	Cavan	3	1	0	2	54	83	−29	2 (Note: Cavan are ranked ahead of Mayo as they won the head-to-head game between the teams.)	Advance to preliminary quarter-final
4	Mayo	3	1	0	2	58	55	+3	2	

Source: GAA

==== Round 1 ====
18 May 2025 All-Ireland	Mayo	1–14 (17) – (20) 1–17	Cavan	Castlebar
14:30		(HT: 0–7 – 0–4)		Venue: MacHale Park
	Gls: A O'Shea 1 Pts: R O'Donoghue 0–5 (1tpf, 3f), S Coen 0–4, M Ruane 0–2, D McHale 0–1, D Thornton 0–1, F Boland 0–1	Report	Gls: G Smith 1 Pts: O Kiernan 0–5 (1tp), C Madden 0–3 (1f), C O'Reilly 0–3, P Faulkner 0–1, C Brady 0–1, C Reilly 0–1, B O'Connell 0–1, P Lynch 0–1, D McVeety 0–1	Referee: Paul Faloon (Down); Attendance: 7,000

24 May 2025 All-Ireland	Donegal	0–20 (20) – (23) 2–17	Tyrone	Ballybofey
19:00		(HT: 0–11 – 2–7)		Venue: MacCumhaill Park
	Pts: M Murphy 0–8 (3tpf, 1f, 1'45), M Langan 0–7 (2tp), C Thompson 0–2 (1f), P McBrearty 0–2 (tp), R McHugh 0–1	Report	Gls: S O'Donnell 2 Pts: D McCurry 0–7 (1tpf, 2f), D Canavan 0–2 (2f), P Harte 0–2 (tp), M McKernan 0–1, K McGeary 0–1, M Brennan 0–1, B McDonnell 0–1, C Daly 0–1, C Quinn 0–1	Referee: Martin McNally (Monaghan); Attendance: 16,120

==== Round 2 ====
31 May 2025 All-Ireland	Tyrone	1–13 (16) – (23) 2–17	Mayo	Omagh
19:00		(HT: 0–4 – 1–9)		Venue: Healy Park
	Gls: D Canavan 1 Pts: N Morgan 0–4 (2tpf), D Canavan 0–3 (2f), D McCurry 0–2 (1f), M McKernan 0–1, K McGeary 0–1, B McDonnell 0–1, M Donnelly 0–1	Report	Gls: D McHale 1, R O'Donoghue 1 (pen); Pts: R O'Donoghue 0–6 (5f), P Durcan 0–3, R Brickenden 0–2, C Reape 0–1 ('45), M Ruane 0–1, J Carney 0–1, B Tuohy 0–1, A O'Shea 0–1, C Dawson 0–1	Referee: David Coldrick (Meath); Attendance: 6,000

1 June 2025 All-Ireland	Cavan	1–13 (16) – (35) 3–26	Donegal	Cavan
14:00		(HT: 1–5 – 1–12)		Venue: Breffni Park
	Gls: B O'Connell 1 Pts: C Madden 0–4 (2f), D McVeety 0–3 (1tp), C O'Reilly 0–2, G Smith 0–1, K Clarke 0–1, L Brady 0–1, J Smith 0–1	Report	Gls: C O'Donnell 1, C McColgan 1, F Roarty 1 Pts: M Murphy 0–7 (1tp, 2'45, 1f), C O'Donnell 0–4, S O'Donnell 0–3, O Gallen 0–3, C Thompson 0–3 (2f), C McColgan 0–1, P Mogan 0–1, C Moore 0–1, R McHugh 0–1, J Brennan 0–1, P McBrearty 0–1 (f)	Referee: Fergal Kelly (Longford); Attendance: 12,509

==== Round 3 ====
15 June 2025 All-Ireland	Mayo	1–15 (18) – (19) 0–19	Donegal	Roscommon
16:00		(HT: 0–6 – 0–9)		Venue: Dr Hyde Park
	Gls: D McBrien 1 Pts: R O'Donoghue 0–6 (5f), D McHale 0–3, C Dawson 0–2, D McHugh 0–1, J Carney 0–1, J Flynn 0–1, F Boland 0–1	Report	Pts: M Murphy 0–5 (1tpf, 1'45), P Mogan 0–2, C Moore 0–2, C Thompson 0–2 (1f), D O Baoill 0–2 (tp), C O'Donnell 0–2, F Roarty 0–1, C McColgan 0–1, S O'Donnell 0–1, O Gallen 0–1	Referee: Paul Faloon (Down); Attendance: 18,731

15 June 2025 All-Ireland	Cavan	0–18 (18) – (31) 0–31	Tyrone	Enniskillen
16:00		(HT: 0–8 – 0–17)		Venue: Brewster Park
	Pts: P Lynch 0–9 (3f, 2tpf, 1'45), C O'Reilly 0–4, R O'Neill 0–2 (tp), O Brady 0–1, S McEvoy 0–1, R Curran 0–1	Report	Pts: D McCurry 0–9 (3f, 1tpf), D Canavan 0–5 (1f), M Donnelly 0–4, R Brennan 0–3 (1tp), K McGeary 0–2, P Harte 0–2 (tp), N Morgan 0–2 (tpf), C Daly 0–1, N Devlin 0–1, S O'Donnell 0–1, E McElholm 0–1	Referee: Martin McNally (Monaghan); Attendance: 6,791

=== Group 2 ===
Pos	Team	Pld	W	D	L	PF	PA	PD	Pts	Qualification
1	Meath	3	2	1	0	62	49	+13	5	Advance to quarter-final
2	Kerry	3	2	0	1	74	62	+12	4	Advance to preliminary quarter-final
3	Cork	3	1	0	2	51	64	−13	2	Advance to preliminary quarter-final
4	Roscommon	3	0	1	2	55	67	−12	1	

Source: GAA

==== Round 1 ====
17 May 2025 All-Ireland	Kerry	3–18 (27) – (17) 0–17	Roscommon	Killarney
14:30		(HT: 0–11 – 0–7)		Venue: Fitzgerald Stadium
	Gls: D Clifford 1, P Geaney 1, G White 1 Pts: S O'Shea 0–7 (2tpf, 1f), D Clifford 0–3 (1tpf), D O'Connor 0–2, J O'Connor 0–2, P Geaney 0–1 (m), T Brosnan 0–1, S Ryan 0–1 ('45), B O Beaglaoich 0–1	Report	Pts: R Daly 0–3 (1tp), C Cox 0–3 (1tp, 1f), D Murtagh 0–3 (1tp), B O'Carroll 0–2, C Murtagh 0–2 (1f), B Stack 0–1, E Nolan 0–1, K Doyle 0–1, D Cregg 0–1	Referee: David Coldrick (Meath); Attendance: 6,814

24 May 2025 All-Ireland	Meath	1–13 (16) – (12) 0–12	Cork	Navan
15:00		(HT: 1–5 – 0–5)		Venue: Páirc Tailteann
	Gls: J Morris 1 Pts: M Costello 0–5 (1f), E Frayne 0–3 (3f), J Conlon 0–2, J Morris 0–1, S Coffey 0–1, B Hogan 0–1	Report	Pts: C Og Jones 0–4, M Cronin 0–4 (1tp, 2f), C O'Callaghan 0–2 (tp), R Deane 0–1, M Taylor 0–1	Referee: Noel Mooney (Cavan)

==== Round 2 ====
31 May 2025 All-Ireland	Roscommon	2–15 (21) – (21) 0–21	Meath	Roscommon
		(HT: 2–5 – 0–16)		Venue: Dr Hyde Park
	Gls: D Murtagh 1, B O'Carroll 1 Pts: E Smith 0–6 (3tp), D Murtagh 0–4 (2tp), D Cregg 0–2, D Ruane 0–1, S Lambe 0–1,, C Murtagh 0–1 (f)	Report	Pts: J Conlon 0–6 (1tp), R Kinsella 0–3 (1tp), E Frayne 0–2, C Duke 0–2 (tp), B Menton 0–2 (tp), J Morris 0–2, B Hogan 0–2 (tpf), M Costello 0–1 (f), S Coffey 0–1	Referee: Paul Faloon (Down)

31 May 2025 All-Ireland	Cork	0–20 (20) – (31) 1–28	Kerry	Cork
16:45		(HT: 0–13 – 1–7)		Venue: Páirc Uí Chaoimh
	Pts: B Hurley 0–7 (2f, 1tp, 1tpf), M Cronin 0–6 (5f), P Walsh 0–3 (1tp), C O'Callaghan 0–2, C Og Jones 0–1, R Deane 0–1	Report	Gls: D Clifford 1 Pts: S O'Shea 0–9 (3tpf, 3f), D Clifford 0–8 (2f, 1tp, 1tpf), P Geaney 0–2, T O'Sullivan 0–2 (tp), T Brosnan 0–2 (tp), K Spillane 0–2, P Clifford 0–1, D Geaney 0–1, G O'Sullivan 0–1	Referee: Derek O'Mahoney (Tipperary); Attendance: 13,072

==== Round 3 ====
14 June 2025 All-Ireland	Kerry	0–16 (16) – (25) 1–22	Meath	Tullamore
16:15		(HT: 0–8 – 0–14)		Venue: Glenisk O'Connor Park
	Pts: D Clifford 0–5 (1f, 1tp), D Geaney 0–4, K Spillane 0–3 (2f), T Brosnan 0–2, P Murphy 0–1, M Burns 0–1	Report	Gls: B Menton 1 Pts: E Frayne 0–5 (2f, 1tp), C Duke 0–5 (1tp), R Kinsella 0–5 (2tp), J Morris 0–2 (1f), K Curtis 0–1, D Keogan 0–1, S Coffey 0–1, C Caulfield 0–1, B Hogan 0–1 ('45)	Referee: Joe McQuillan (Cavan); Attendance: 8,265

14 June 2025 All-Ireland	Roscommon	0–17 (17) – (19) 0–19	Cork	Portlaoise
16:15		(HT: 0–6 – 0–10)		Venue: O'Moore Park
	Pts: D Cregg 0–5, D Murtagh 0–2, C McKeon 0–2, D Smith 0–1, C Murtagh 0–1, S Lambe 0–1, E Smith 0–1, D Ruane 0–1, B O'Carroll 0–1, E Nolan 0–1, C Carroll 0–1	Report	Pts: M Cronin 0–5 (2f), S McDonnell 0–4, B O'Driscoll 0–2 (tp), I Maguire 0–2, C O'Callaghan 0–2, B Hurley 0–1, E McSweeney 0–1, P Walsh 0–1, C O'Mahony 0–1	Referee: Martin McNally (Monaghan)

=== Group 3 ===
Pos	Team	Pld	W	D	L	PF	PA	PD	Pts	Qualification
1	Monaghan	3	3	0	0	87	68	+19	6	Advance to quarter-final
2	Down	3	2	0	1	90	76	+14	4	Advance to preliminary quarter-final
3	Louth	3	1	0	2	67	71	−4	2	Advance to preliminary quarter-final
4	Clare	3	0	0	3	58	87	−29	0	

Source: GAA

==== Round 1 ====
18 May 2025 All-Ireland Group 3 Rd 1	Clare	1–16 (19) – (36) 3–27	Down	Ennis
14:00		(HT: 1–6 – 2–18)		Venue: Cusack Park
	Gls: A Griffin 1 Pts: M McInerney 0–6 (1tp, 1f, 1'45), E McMahon 0–5 (1tp, 2f), D Coughlan 0–2, A Griffin 0–1, E Cleary 0–1, J Stack 0–1	Report	Gls: J McGeough 1, D Guinness 1, C Mooney 1 Pts: P Havern 0–9 (1tp, 1tpf, 3f), D Magill 0–7 (2tp), A Crummins 0–3, J Guinness 0–2, O Murdock 0–2 (1f), J McGeough 0–1, D Guinness 0–1, M Rooney 0–1, R McEvoy 0–1	Referee: Paddy Neilan (Roscommon); Attendance: 1,556

24 May 2025 All-Ireland Group 3 Rd 1	Louth	4–08 (20) – (26) 1–23	Monaghan	Newbridge
16:45		(HT: 2–5 – 1–11)		Venue: St Conleth's Park
	Gls: S Mulroy 2 (1 pen), T Durnin 2 Pts: R Burns 0–5 (1f, 2tp), S Mulroy 0–2 (1f), C Byrne 0–1	Report	Gls: S O'Hanlon 1 Pts: M Bannigan 0–6 (1tp, 1f), R Beggan 0–4 (2tpf), D Ward 0–3, S Mooney 0–3, S O'Hanlon 0–3, J McCarron 0–2 (1f), C McCarthy 0–1, K Duffy 0–1	Referee: Brendan Cawley (Kildare)

==== Round 2 ====
31 May 2025 All-Ireland Group 3 Rd 2	Down	0–25 (25) – (24) 0–24	Louth	Newry
17:30		(HT: 0–16 – 0–7)		Venue: Pairc Esler
	Pts: D Magill 0–6 (1tp), P Havern 0–6 (1f, 1tp), O Murdock 0–5 (1f, 1tpf, 1tp), A Crummins 0–2, C Doherty 0–1, R Magill 0–1, J McGeough 0–1, M Rooney 0–1, C Mooney 0–1, S Millar 0–1	Report	Pts: S Mulroy 0–12 (3f, 2tp, 2tpf), R Burns 0–3, C Lennon 0–3 (1tp), T Durnin 0–2 (tp), C Downey 0–2, C Grimes 0–1, C McKeever 0–1	Attendance: 10,240

1 June 2025 All-Ireland Group 3 Rd 2	Monaghan	1–25 (28) – (19) 1–16	Clare	Clones
16:00		(HT: 0–7 – 0–14)		Venue: St Tiernach's Park
	Gls: C McCarthy 1 Pts: J McCarron 0–8 (2tp, 1tpf, 1f), R Beggan 0–5 (2tpf, 1'45), M Bannigan 0–3 (1f), D Garland 0–2 (tp), C McCarthy 0–1, R McAnespie 0–1, D Ward 0–1, A Woods 0–1, A Carey 0–1, S O'Hanlon 1, S Mooney 0–1	Report	Gls: A Griffin 1 Pts: C Meaney 0–4 (2tp), M McInerney 0–4 (1tp, 1f), A Griffin 0–3 (1f), D Walsh 0–2, E Cleary 0–2 (1tp), D Coughlan 0–1

==== Round 3 ====
15 June 2025 All-Ireland Group 3 Rd 3	Monaghan	2–27 (33) – (29) 1–26	Down	Armagh
14:00		(HT: 1–14 – 1–15)		Venue: Athletic Grounds
	Gls: J McCarron 1, M Bannigan 1 Pts: R Beggan 0–6 (3tpf), J McCarron 0–3 (1tp, 1f), S O'Hanlon 0–3, M Bannigan 0–2, C McCarthy 0–2 (tp), M McCarville 0–2 (tp), D Ward 0–2, A Woods 0–2, R O'Toole 0–2, A Carey 0–1, L Kelly 0–1, D Garland 0–1	Report	Gls: J McGeough 1 Pts: P Havern 0–12 (3tpf, 3f), D Magill 0–4 (1tp), A Crimmins 0–2, D Guinness 0–2, O Murdock 0–2 (1f), C McCrickard 0–2 (1f), C Doherty 0–1, E Branagan 0–1

15 June 2025 All-Ireland Group 3 Rd 3	Louth	2–17 (23) – (20) 2–14	Clare	Portlaoise
14:00		(HT: 2–8 – 0–6)		Venue: O'Moore Park
	Gls: S Mulroy 1, C Downey 1 Pts: S Mulroy 0–6 (1f, 1tpf), C Downey 0–5, C Branigan 0–2, C Lennon 0–1, C Grimes 0–1, R Burns 0–1, R Walsh 0–1	Report	Gls: E Cleary 1, R McMahon 1 Pts: M McInerney 0–5 (3f), E Cleary 0–2, E McMahon 0–2, B McNamara 0–1, A Griffin 0–1, S Ryan 0–1 ('45)

=== Group 4 ===
Pos	Team	Pld	W	D	L	PF	PA	PD	Pts	Qualification
1	Armagh	3	2	0	1	78	70	+8	4 (Note: Armagh are ranked ahead of Dublin as they won the head-to-head game between the teams.)	Advance to quarter-final
2	Dublin	3	2	0	1	62	64	−2	4	Advance to preliminary quarter-final
3	Galway	3	1	1	1	74	74	0	3	Advance to preliminary quarter-final
4	Derry	3	0	1	2	69	75	−6	1	

Source: GAA

==== Round 1 ====
17 May 2025 All-Ireland Group 4 Rd 1	Galway	2–14 (20) – (21) 1–18	Dublin	Salthill
17:00		(HT: 0-08 – 1-09)		Venue: Pearse Stadium
	Gls: R Finnerty 1, M Thompson 1 Pts: R Finnerty 0–6 (1f, 1tp), M Tierney 0–2, S Walsh 0–2 (tp), M Thompson 0–1, J McGrath 0–1, C McDaid 0–1, J Maher 0–1	Report	Gls: C Costello 1 Pts: C Costello 0–3 (2f), C O'Callaghan 0–3, S Bugler 0–3, L O'Dell 0–3, K McGinnis 0–2, C Kilkenny 0–2, B O'Leary 0–1, T Lahiff 0–1	Referee: David Gough (Meath); Attendance: ~18,000

24 May 2025 All-Ireland Group 4 Rd 1	Armagh	2–21 (27) – (23) 2–17	Derry	Armagh
17:00		(HT: 0–12 – 0–9)		Venue: Athletic Grounds (Armagh)
	Gls: B McCambridge 1, C Turbitt 1 Pts: R McQuillan 0–4, O Conaty 0–4 (1tp), R Grugan 0–3 (2f), A Murnin 0–3, C Turbitt 0–2 (1tp), R O'Neill 0–1, J Og Burns 0–1, J Duffy 0–1, D McMullan 0–1, J McElroy 0–1	Report	Gls: C Glass 1, D Higgins 1 Pts: S McGuigan 0–5 (1tp, 1tpf), P Cassidy 0–5 (1tp), C Glass 0–3, P McGrogan 0–1 ('45), E Doherty 0–1, N Toner 0–1 (f), R Forbes 0–1	Attendance: 14,979

==== Round 2 ====
1 June 2025 All-Ireland Group 4 Rd 2	Derry	2–20 (26) – (26) 4–14	Galway	Derry
14:00		(HT: 1–11 – 2–6)		Venue: Celtic Park
	Gls: C Glass 1, N Loughlin 1 Pts: S McGuigan 0–4 (1tpf, 1f), C Glass 0–3 (1'45), B Rogers 0–3 (1tp), P Cassidy 0–3 (tp), N Loughlin 0–2, L Murray 0–2, C McFaul 0–1, N Toner 0–1, C Doherty 0–1	Report	Gls: M Tierney 2, R Finnerty 1, S Walsh 1 Pts: R Finnerty 0–3 (1f), M Thompson 0–2, P Crooke 0–2 (tp), S Kelly 0–1, P Conroy 0–1, J Maher 0–1, S O'Neill 0–1, S Walsh 0–1 (f), C Darcy 0–1, D Comer 0–1

1 June 2025 All-Ireland Group 4 Rd 2	Dublin	0–19 (19) – (24) 0–24	Armagh	Dublin
16:00		(HT: 0–9 – 0–13)		Venue: Croke Park
	Pts: C Costello 0–8 (3f, 1tp), P Small 0–4 (1tp), S Bugler 0–3 (1tp), L Gannon 0–2, L O'Dell 0–1, B Howard 0–1	Report	Pts: R Grugan 0–8 (4f, 1tpf, 1tp), R O'Neill 0–6 (2tp, 1tpf), J Og Burns 0–2, O Conaty 0–2, E Rafferty 0–1, R McQuillan 0–1, D McMullan 0–1, C Turbitt 0–1, J McElroy 0–1, S Campbell 0–1	Attendance: 38,763

==== Round 3 ====
14 June 2025 All-Ireland Group 4 Rd 3	Galway	2–22 (28) – (27) 0–27	Armagh	Cavan
18:30		(HT: 0–7 – 0–15)		Venue: Breffni Park
	Gls: R Finnerty 1 (pen), J Maher; Pts: S Walsh 0–9 (1tpf, 1f), R Finnerty 0–4, P Cooke 0–3 (1tp), C McDaid 0–2, C Darcy 0–1, M Tierney 0–1, C Sweeney 0–1, P Conroy 0–1	Report	Pts: E Rafferty 0–7 (2tpf, 1tp), R McQuillan 0–3, N Grimley 0–3 (1tp), C McConville 0–3, D McMullan 0–2, R O'Neill 0–1, J Burns 0–1, P McGrane 0–1, S Campbell 0–1, S McPartlan 0–1, C Turbitt 0–1, A Murnin 0–1, J Duffy 0–1

14 June 2025 All-Ireland Group 4 Rd 3	Dublin	0–22 (22) – (20) 0–20	Derry	Newry
18:30		(HT: 0–13 – 0–13)		Venue: Páirc Esler
	Pts: C O'Callaghan 0–5, C Costello 0–4 (1tpf, 1f), K McGinnis 0–3, P Small 0–2, S Cluxton 0–2 (tpf), L Gannon 0–2, S Bugler 0–2, J Small 0–1, C Kilkenny 0–1	Report	Pts: S McGuigan 0–10 (3tpf, 3f), E Doherty 0–3, C Glass 0–2, N Loughlin 0–2, N Toner 0–1, P Cassidy 0–1, B Rogers 0–1	Attendance: 12,242

== Knockout stage ==
=== Knockout stage seeding ===
Seeded into quarter-finals

- Armagh
- Meath
- Monaghan
- Tyrone

Seeded into preliminary quarter-finals

- Donegal
- Down
- Dublin
- Kerry

Unseeded in preliminary quarter-finals

- Cavan
- Cork
- Galway
- Louth

=== Bracket ===
Preliminary Quarter-Finals
Donegal	2–22
Louth	0–12
Down	3–21
Galway	2–26
Kerry	3–20
Cavan	1–17
Dublin	1–19
Cork	1–16

Quarter-finals
Monaghan	1–20
Donegal	1–26
Meath	2–16
Galway	2–15
Armagh	1–21
Kerry	0–32
Tyrone	0–23
Dublin	0–16

Semi-finals
Donegal	3–26
Meath	0–15
Kerry	1–20
Tyrone	0–17

Final
Donegal	0–19
Kerry	1–26

=== Preliminary quarter-finals ===
21 June 2025 Preliminary quarter-final	Kerry	3–20 (29) – (20) 1–17	Cavan	Killarney
15:30		(HT: 2–12 – 0–8)		Venue: Fitzgerald Stadium
		Report		Attendance: 9,040

21 June 2025 Preliminary quarter-final	Dublin	1–19 (22) – (19) 1–16	Cork	Dublin
18:15				Venue: Croke Park
		Report		Attendance: 36,546

22 June 2025 Preliminary quarter-final	Down	3–21 (30) – (32) 2–26	Galway	Newry
13:45		(HT: 1-06 1–16)		Venue: Páirc Esler
	Gls: 3 Pts: 21	Report	Gls: 2 Pts: 26	Attendance: 14,435

22 June 2025 Preliminary quarter-final	Donegal	2–22 (28) – (12) 0–12	Louth	Ballybofey
16:00		(HT: 1-06 0-07)		Venue: MacCumhaill Park
	Gls: 2 Pts: 22	Report	Gls: 0 Pts: 12	Attendance: 15,369

=== Quarter-finals ===
28 June 2025 Quarter-final	Monaghan	1–20 (23) – (29) 1–26	Donegal	Dublin
16:00
				Attendance: 61,659

28 June 2025 Quarter-final	Tyrone	0-23 (23) – (16) 0–16	Dublin	Dublin
18:15
				Attendance: 61,659

29 June 2025 Quarter-final	Meath	2-16 (22) – (21) 2–15	Galway	Dublin
13:45
				Attendance: 70,530

29 June 2025 Quarter-final	Armagh	1-21 (24) – (32) 0–32	Kerry	Dublin
16:00
	Gls: 1 Pts: 21		Gls: 0 Pts: 32	Attendance: 70,530

=== Semi-finals ===
12 July 2025 Semi-final	Tyrone	0–17 (17) – (23) 1–20	Kerry	Dublin
17:00		(HT: 0–9 – 1–9)
	Gls: Darragh Canavan 0–7 (2fs, 1 2pt), Seánie O'Donnell 0–2, Ciarán Daly 0–2, Mattie Donnelly 0–2, Ruairi Canavan 0–2 (2pt), Kieran McGeary 0–1, Eoin McElholm 0–1		Gls: David Clifford 1–9 (0-4fs, 1 2pt), Seán O'Shea 0–3 (2fs), Paudie Clifford 0–2, Killian Spillane 0–2, Joe O'Connor 0–2	Referee: Joe McQuillan (Cavan); Attendance: 62,434

13 July 2025 Semi-final	Donegal	3-26 (35) – (15) 0–15	Meath	Dublin
16:00
	Gls: Conor O'Donnell 1–3, Michael Murphy 0–6 (1 2ptf, 1f), Oisín Gallen 1–2, Ciarán Moore 1–1, Michael Langan 0–4, Paddy McBrearty 0–3, Ciarán Thompson 0–2, Ryan McHugh, Peadar Mogan, Daire Ó Baoill, Shane O'Donnell, and Shaun Patton (45) 0–1 each	Report	Gls: Eoghan Frayne 0–5 (1 2pt, 1f), Keith Curtis and Ruairi Kinsella (1 2pt) 0–3 each, Jordan Morris, Conor Duke, Seán Rafferty, and Mathew Costello (f) 0–1 each	Referee: Paul Faloon (Down); Attendance: 82,000

=== Final ===
27 July 2025 Final	Kerry	1–26 (29) – (19) 0–19	Donegal	Dublin
15:30		(HT: 0–17 – 0–10)
	Gls: D. Clifford (0–9, 3 tps); S. O’Shea (0–6, 2 tp frees, 1 free); D. Geaney, G. White, P. Clifford (0–3 each); J. O’Connor (1–0); S. O’Brien (0–2).	Report	Gls: M. Murphy (0–8, 6 frees); C. O’Donnell (0–4); O. Gallen (0–3); S. O’Donnell (0–2); C. McConagle, D. Ó Baoill (0–1 each).	Referee: Brendan Cawley (Kildare); Attendance: 82,109

== Stadia and locations ==
County	Location	Province	Stadium	Capacity
Antrim	Belfast	Ulster	Corrigan Park	3,700
Armagh	Armagh	Ulster	Athletic Grounds	18,500
Carlow	Carlow	Leinster	Dr Cullen Park	21,000
Cavan	Cavan	Ulster	Breffni Park	25,030
Clare	Ennis	Munster	Cusack Park	19,000
Cork	Cork	Munster	Páirc Uí Chaoimh	45,000
Derry	Derry	Ulster	Celtic Park	18,500
Donegal	Ballybofey	Ulster	MacCumhaill Park	18,000
Down	Newry	Ulster	Páirc Esler	20,000
Dublin	Dublin	Leinster	Croke Park	82,300
Fermanagh	Enniskillen	Ulster	Brewster Park	20,000
Galway	Galway	Connacht	Pearse Stadium	26,197
Kerry	Killarney	Munster	Fitzgerald Stadium	38,000
Kildare	Newbridge	Leinster	St Conleth's Park	15,000
Laois	Portlaoise	Leinster	O'Moore Park	22,000
Leitrim	Carrick-on-Shannon	Connacht	Páirc Seán Mac Diarmada	9,331
Limerick	Limerick	Munster	Gaelic Grounds	44,023
London	South Ruislip	Britain	McGovern Park	3,000
Longford	Longford	Leinster	Pearse Park	10,000
Louth	Drogheda	Leinster	Drogheda Park	3,500
Mayo	Castlebar	Connacht	MacHale Park	25,369
Meath	Navan	Leinster	Páirc Tailteann	11,000
Monaghan	Clones	Ulster	St Tiernach's Park	29,000
New York	Bronx	North America	Gaelic Park	2,000
Offaly	Tullamore	Leinster	O'Connor Park	18,000
Roscommon	Roscommon	Connacht	Dr Hyde Park	18,890
Sligo	Sligo	Connacht	Markievicz Park	18,558
Tipperary	Thurles	Munster	Semple Stadium	45,690
Tyrone	Omagh	Ulster	Healy Park	17,636
Waterford	Waterford	Munster	Fraher Field	15,000
Westmeath	Mullingar	Leinster	Cusack Park	11,000
Wexford	Wexford	Leinster	Chadwicks Wexford Park	18,000
Wicklow	Aughrim	Leinster	Aughrim County Ground	7,000

== Statistics ==
=== Top scorers ===
==== Overall ====
Rank	Player	County	Tally	Total	Matches	Average
1	David Clifford	Kerry	8–62	86	9	9.55
2	Seán O'Shea	Kerry	1–50	53	8	6.62
3	Michael Murphy	Donegal	0–52	52	11	4.72
4	Robert Finnerty	Galway	3–40	49		0.00
5	Sam Mulroy	Louth	4–37	49		0.00
6	Ryan O'Donoghue	Mayo	2–39	45		0.00
7	Pat Havern	Down	0–41	41	6	6.83
6	Eoghan Frayne	Meath	0–41	41		0.00
9	Darren McCurry	Tyrone	0–37	37	7	5.28
10	Conor O'Donnell	Donegal	3–25	34		0.00
11	Cormac Costello	Dublin	2–27	33		0.00
12	Mark McInerney	Clare	2–27	33	0	0.00
13	Matthew Tierney	Galway	6–15	33		0.00

==== In a single game ====
Rank	Player	County	Tally	Total	Opposition

== Miscellaneous ==
- Liam Gallagher scored the first two-pointer in championship football. He did so against Roscommon in the 14th minute of their 2025 Connacht SFC meeting in Ruislip.
- Neither Leinster SFC semi-final was held at Croke Park. This had not happened since 1995.
- As Portlaoise hosted Dublin v Meath in the Leinster Senior Football Championship for the first since the fixture was played in Navan in 1980 that the fixture is not played at Croke Park. The match ended Dublin's 14-year spell as Leinster champions.
- Clare scored a first Munster Senior Football Championship victory over Tipperary since 2000.
- Clare reached a third consecutive Munster SFC final, having only previously done so in 1915–1916–1917.
- Louth reached a third consecutive Leinster SFC final, having only previously done so in 1912–1913–1914.
- Galway won a fourth consecutive Connacht SFC title for the first time since 1963–1966.
- Louth won a first SFC Leinster title since 1957.
- Cavan defeated Mayo in the championship for the first time since the 1948 All-Ireland SFC final.
- Meath scored their first All-Ireland Senior Football Championship victory over Kerry since the 2001 semi-final.
- Kerry's defeat against Meath (9 points) was their heaviest since the 2001 semi-final.
- Clare met Louth for the first time in the history of the championship.
- Down played Galway in the championship for the first time since 1971.
- Cavan conceded an all-time championship record of 3–26 against Donegal.
- Meath reached the All-Ireland semi-finals for the first time since 2009.
- Donegal defeated Meath by 20 points in the All-Ireland semi-finals; this tied for the fourth biggest winning margin in an All-Ireland SFC semi-final; the last score of the same size was in 1993 when Cork beat Mayo by 20. It was also the second-biggest win for Donegal in the championship (they beat Clare by 24 points in 2024), and the 3–26 (35 pts) they scored was the most scored by Donegal in a championship match.
- Donegal played against 6 different Ulster counties in the championship, only missing Fermanagh and Antrim.
- Donegal became the first team to play 11 championship matches in the same season.
- Kerry won a record 39th title.
- Kerry's score of 1–26, a total of 29 points, is the highest score ever in an All Ireland senior football championship final.

== Attendances ==
The following table lists all 2025 All-Ireland Senior Football Championship matches with an attendance of at least 30,000. Attendance figures are taken from the match reports on this page.

#	Date	Match	Venue	Attendance	Note
1	27 July 2025	Kerry vs Donegal	Croke Park	82,109	Final
2	13 July 2025	Donegal vs Meath	Croke Park	82,000	Semi-final
3	29 June 2025	Armagh vs Kerry; Meath vs Galway	Croke Park	70,530	Quarter-finals doubleheader
4	11 May 2025	Meath vs Louth	Croke Park	65,786	Leinster final
5	12 July 2025	Tyrone vs Kerry	Croke Park	62,434	Semi-final
6	28 June 2025	Monaghan vs Donegal; Tyrone vs Dublin	Croke Park	61,659	Quarter-finals doubleheader
7	1 June 2025	Dublin vs Armagh	Croke Park	38,763	Round 2
8	21 June 2025	Dublin vs Cork	Croke Park	36,546	Preliminary quarter-final

== See also ==
- 2025 Connacht Senior Football Championship
- 2025 Leinster Senior Football Championship
- 2025 Munster Senior Football Championship
- 2025 Ulster Senior Football Championship
- 2025 Tailteann Cup (Tier 2)
- 2025 All-Ireland Senior Hurling Championship
- 2025 All-Ireland Senior Ladies' Football Championship
