= 1915 All-Ireland Senior Football Championship final =

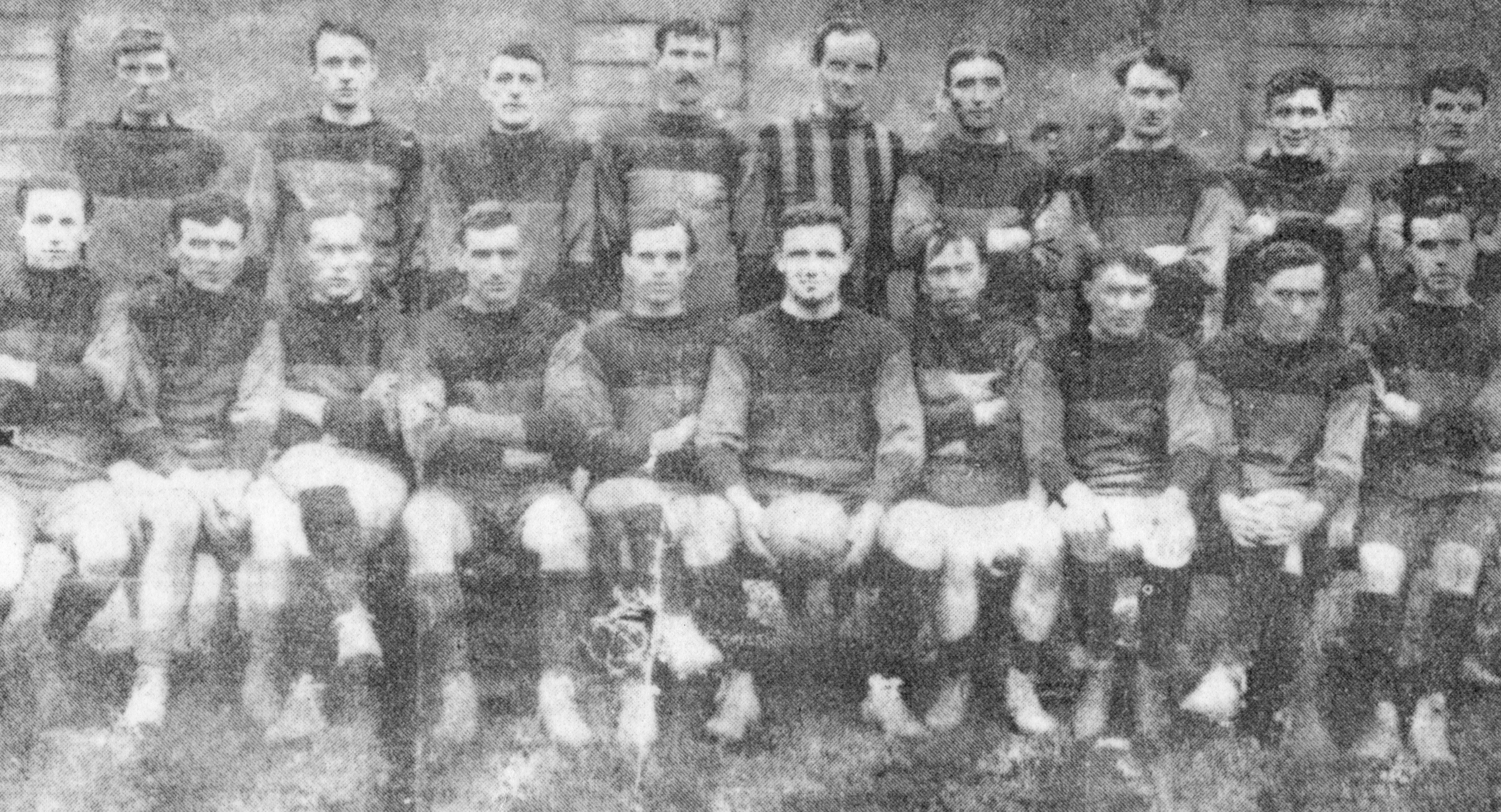
- Wexford, champions
- Event: 1915 All-Ireland Senior Football Championship
Wexford	Kerry
2–4 (10)	2–1 (7)
- Date: 7 November 1915
- Venue: Croke Park, Dublin
- Referee: Pat Dunphy (Laois)
- Attendance: 27,000
- Weather: Fine

The 1915 All-Ireland Senior Football Championship final was the 28th All-Ireland Final and the deciding match of the 1915 All-Ireland Senior Football Championship, an inter-county Gaelic football tournament for the top teams in Ireland.

== Match ==
=== Summary ===
Wexford won by three points; their goals were scored by Jim and Aidan Byrne, while Dick Fitzgerald and Denis Doyle got Kerry's goals.

It was the first of four consecutive All-Ireland SFC titles won by Wexford between 1915 and 1918.

Seán O'Kennedy, whose brother Gus played at corner-forward, captained Wexford.

=== Details ===
7 Nov 1915
Final

Wexford	2–4 – 2–1	Kerry

Croke Park, Dublin
Referee: Pat Dunphy (Laois)
Attendance: 27,000

Wexford	Kerry

==== Wexford ====
- Seán O'Kennedy (c)
- Gus O'Kennedy
- Paddy Mackey
- Tom Murphy
- Frank Furlong
- J. Wall
- Edmund Wheeler
- Tom Mernagh
- Tom Doyle
- Ned Black
- Aidan Doyle
- Jim Byrne
- Martin Howlett
- Dick Reynolds
- Tom McGrath (goal)
