= 1914 All-Ireland Senior Football Championship final =

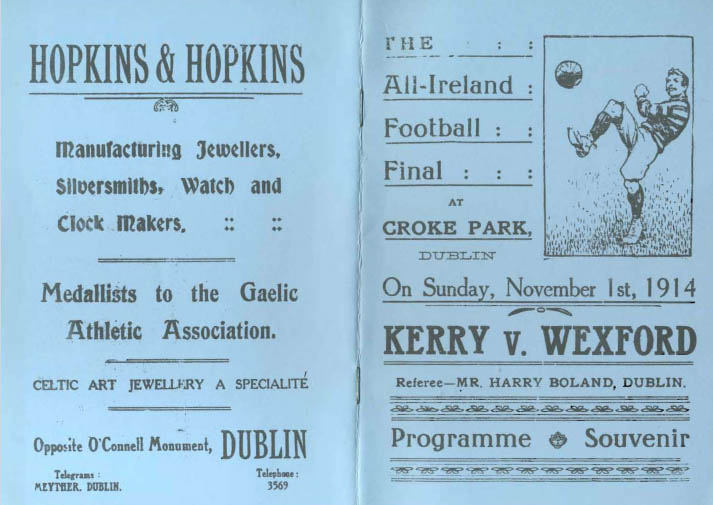
- Official match programme
- Event: 1914 All-Ireland Senior Football Championship
Kerry	Wexford
1–3 (6)	2–0 (6)
- Date: 1 November 1914
- Venue: Croke Park, Dublin
- Referee: Harry Boland (Dublin)
- Attendance: 13,000

1914 All-Ireland Senior Football Championship final replay
Kerry	Wexford
2–3 (9)	0–6 (6)
- Date: 29 November 1914
- Venue: Croke Park, Dublin
- Referee: Harry Boland (Dublin)
- Attendance: 20,000
- Weather: Windy

The 1914 All-Ireland Senior Football Championship final was the 27th All-Ireland Final and the deciding match of the 1914 All-Ireland Senior Football Championship, an inter-county Gaelic football tournament for the top teams in Ireland. It was held at Croke Park in Dublin on 1 November. The game ended in a draw, and a replay was held on 29 November.

Harry Boland was the referee.

Seán O'Kennedy, whose brother Gus played at corner-forward, captained Wexford.

== First game ==
The final ended in a draw, necessitating a replay. Wexford led 2–0 to 0–1 at half-time, but Kerry fought back to score five points in the second half.

The final score was 2–0 for Wexford and 1–3 for Kerry. The Kerry point that brought them level was scored with only two minutes of play remaining. Dick Fitzgerald got it. Wexford did not score in the second half, and managed no points in the entire game.

Over 26 trains were specially laid on for the final, coming from all parts of the island.

== Replay ==
The replay was held in windy conditions on 29 November. The wind proved critical to the outcome of the game. Wexford's six points were scored during the first half when they had the wind behind them. Kerry's scored all of their two goals and three points during the second half.

Special trains were also put on for the replay from destinations across the island: Belturbet, Cork, Cahersiveen, Dingle, Galway, Enniscorthy, New Ross, Shillelagh, Sligo, Waterford and Wexford. These trains contained young men often "accompanied by their sisters and their sweethearts. The cramping and discomforts of a three to a six hours' train journey, in a stifling and vitiated atmosphere, was borne with the greatest of goodwill and forbearance. There was no complaining; jokes were cracked; humorous, patriotic, and sentimental songs were sung; and there was every sort of music, from bands and violins down to the tin whistle and mouth organ", said an analysis from a week later (5 December).

The Dublin restaurants "did a good trade, and so did the public houses in certain districts. But there was practically no drunkenness, disorderly conduct, or horseplay on the streets".

== Details ==
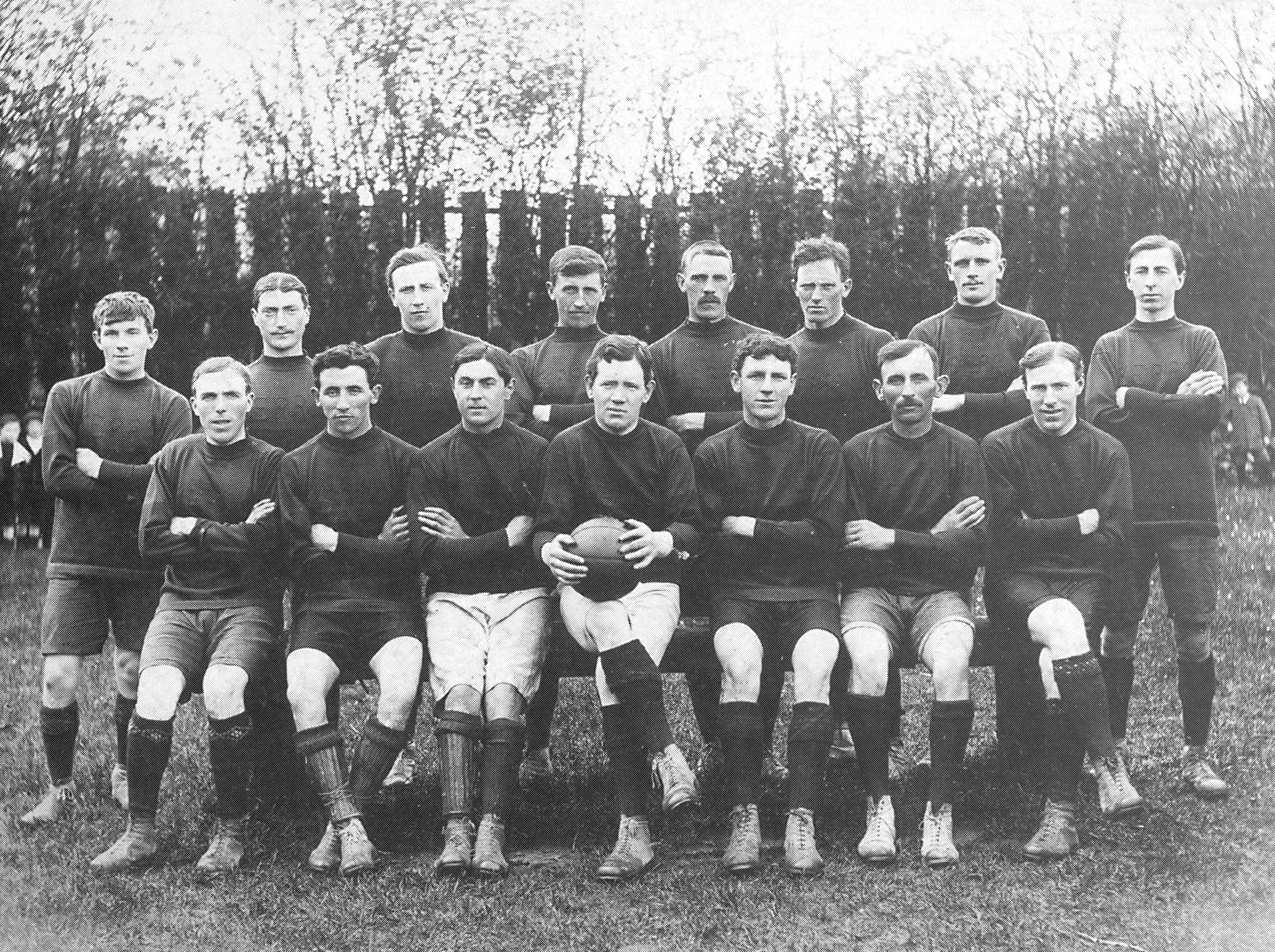
Kerry, champions

1 Nov 1914
Final

Kerry	1–3 – 2–0	Wexford

Croke Park, Dublin
Referee: Harry Boland (Dublin)
Attendance: 13,000

20 Nov 1914
Replay

Kerry	2–3 – 0–6	Wexford

Croke Park, Dublin
Referee: Harry Boland (Dublin)
Attendance: 20,000

Kerry	Wexford

=== Kerry (is this the replay or the drawn game?) ===
- 1 Danny Mullins
- 2 Maurice McCarthy
- 3 Jack Lawlor
- 4 Tom Costelloe
- 5 Tom Rice
- 6 Paddy Healy
- 7 Jack Rice
- 8 Con Murphy
- 9 Pat O'Shea
- 10 Con Clifford
- 11 Dick Fitzgerald
- 12 John O'Mahony
- 13 Johnny Skinner
- 14 Paddy Breen
- 15 Denis Doyle

=== Wexford (is this the replay or the drawn game?) ===
- Seán O'Kennedy (c)
- T. McGrath (goal)
- Tom Murphy
- Paddy Mackey
- Jim Byrne
- P. D. Breen
- Tom Doyle
- Tom Mernagh
- P. Murphy
- Jim Doyle
- Joe Mullally
- Dick Reynolds
- Aidan Doyle
- Gus O'Kennedy
- Jim Rossiter

== Aftermath ==
The great-grandson of one of the winning Kerry players was association football player Gary Breen.
