= Con Clifford =

Irish Gaelic footballer

Personal information
- Born: 26 February 1888 Tralee, County Kerry, United Kingdom of Great Britain and Ireland
- Died: 24 December 1961 (aged 73) Tralee, County Kerry, Ireland
- Occupation: Businessman

Sport
- Sport: Gaelic football
- Position: Full-back
Club
- Years: Club
- Tralee Mitchels
Club titles
	Football	Hurling
Kerry titles	3	3
Inter-county
- Years: County
- 1912-1919: Kerry
Inter-county titles
- Munster titles: 5
- All-Irelands: 2

Cornelius Clifford (26 February 1888 – 24 December 1961) was a footballer and Gaelic games administrator. His championship career with the Kerry senior team lasted eight seasons from 1912 until 1919.

== Life ==
From Tralee, County Kerry, Clifford was born to Patrick and Hanora Clifford. The son of a businessman, he was educated locally and later inherited the family business becoming head of C. Clifford and Sons, Ltd.

Clifford first played competitive football and hurling with the Tralee Mitchels club. During a successful era for the club, Clifford was a dual player and won three championship medals in each code.

Success at club level saw Clifford join the Kerry senior team and he made his debut during the 1912 championship. Over the course of the next eight seasons he enjoyed much success and won two All-Ireland medals as part of back-to-back successes in 1913 and 1914. He also won five Munster medals.

== Honours ==
Tralee Mitchels

- Kerry Senior Football Championship (3): 1907, 1908, 1910
- Kerry Senior Hurling Championship (3): 1908, 1911, 1912

Kerry

- All-Ireland Senior Football Championship (2): 1913, 1914
- Munster Senior Football Championship (5): 1912, 1913, 1914, 1915, 1919
