= Redmond Barry (disambiguation) =

Sir Redmond Barry (1813–1880) was an Irish lawyer who served as judge of the Supreme Court of Victoria.

Redmond Barry may also refer to:

- Redmond Barry (died 1750), Irish MP
- Redmond Barry (lord chancellor) (1866–1913), Lord Chancellor of Ireland
- Redmond Barry (sportsman), Wexford hurling and football player of the 2000s
- Redmond Barry, title character of the 1844 novel The Luck of Barry Lyndon and its 1975 film adaptation Barry Lyndon
