= William Hodgins =

William Hodgins may refer to:

- William H. Hodgins, American law enforcement officer
- William Thomas Hodgins, farmer and political figure in Ontario, Canada
- Bill Hodgins, Irish Gaelic footballer
