= 1914 All-Ireland Senior Football Championship =

Gaelic football competition

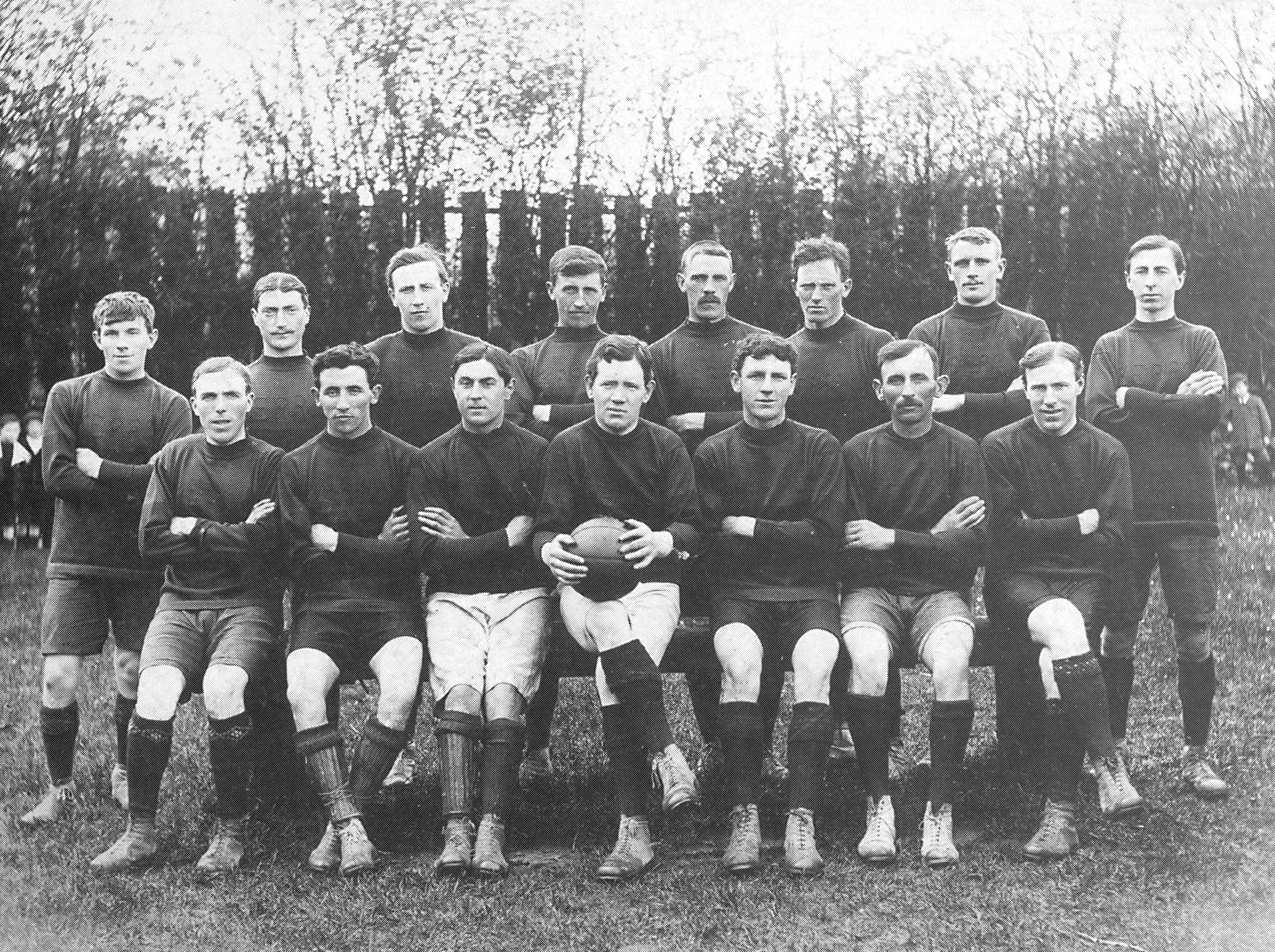

All-Ireland Champions
- Winning team: Kerry (5th win)
- Captain: Dick Fitzgerald

All-Ireland Finalists
- Losing team: Wexford

Provincial Champions
- Munster: Kerry
- Leinster: Wexford
- Ulster: Monaghan
- Connacht: Roscommon

Championship statistics

The 1914 All-Ireland Senior Football Championship was the 28th staging of Ireland's premier Gaelic football knock-out competition. Kerry were the winners.

== Results ==
=== Connacht ===
Connacht Senior Football Championship

2 August 1914
Quarter-Final

Roscommon	2–3 – 1–3	Mayo

Castlerea

12 July 1914
Semi-Final

Leitrim	5–7 – 0–2	Sligo

Boyle

20 September 1914
Semi-Final

Roscommon	0-14 – 0-1	Galway

Castlebar

17 October 1914
Final

Roscommon	1–2 – 0–1	Leitrim

Boyle

=== Leinster ===
Leinster Senior Football Championship

21 June 1914
Preliminary Round

Kilkenny	1–2 – 0–2	Wicklow

New Ross

21 June 1914
Preliminary Round

Wexford	2–4 – 1–1	Meath

Croke Park, Dublin
Referee: TC Murphy (Dublin)

7 June 1914
Quarter-Final

Dublin	0–5 – 0–1	Carlow

Portlaoise

14 June 1914
Quarter-Final

Louth	3–9 – 0–2	Offaly

Croke Park, Dublin
Referee: Patrick Dunphy (Laois)

14 June 1914
Quarter-Final

Laois	1–4 – 0–5	Kildare

Croke Park, Dublin
Referee: M Collins

12 July 1914
Quarter-Final

Wexford	1–5 – 0–3	Kilkenny

New Ross
Referee: J Dunphy (Laois)

5 July 1914
Semi-Final

Louth	5–3 – 0–3	Laois

Croke Park, Dublin
Referee: TC Murphy

1914
Semi-Final

Wexford	4–6 – 1–1	Dublin

St James Park, Kilkenny
Referee: J Dunphy (Laois)

16 August 1914
Final

Wexford	3–6 – 0–1	Louth

Croke Park, Dublin
Referee: Patrick Dunphy (Laois)

GK	1	Michael Sheridan (Newtownbarry)
RCB	2	Tom Mernagh (Ballyhogue and Davidstown)
FB	3	Paddy Mackey (New Ross Geraldines)
LCB	4	Jem Byrne (Blue and Whites)
RHB	5	Edmund Wheeler (Blue and Whites)
CHB	6	Tom Doyle (Ballyhogue and Davidstown)
LHB	7	Tom Murphy (Rapparees)
MF	8	Dick Hanrahan (New Ross Geraldines)
MF	9	Johnny Doyle (Rapparees)
RHF	10	Joe Mullally (Blue and Whites)
CHF	11	Rich Reynolds (Blue and Whites)
LHF	12	Aidan Doyle (Ballyhogue and Davidstown)
RCF	13	Seán O'Kennedy (New Ross Geraldines) (c)
FF	14	Gus O'Kennedy (New Ross Geraldines)
LCF	15	Jim Rossiter (Blue and Whites)
Substitute:
	16	Jack Crowley (Blue and Whites) for Mullally

GK	1	Tom McDonald (Dundalk Rangers)
RCB	2	John Clarke (Tredaghs)
FB	3	Joe Donnelly (Geraldines)
LCB	4	John Hearty (Dundalk Young Irelands)
RHB	5	Joe Mulligan (Dundalk Young Irelands)
CHB	6	Jim Smith (Tredaghs)
LHB	7	Pat Carroll (Dundalk Young Irelands)
MF	8	Larry McCormack (Tredaghs) (c)
MF	9	Eoin Markey (Ardee St Mochta's)
RHF	10	Joe Johnston (Geraldines)
CHF	11	Pat Ward (Geraldines)
LHF	12	Paddy Reilly (Tredaghs)
RCF	13	Johnny Brennan (Dundalk Rangers)
FF	14	Joe Quinn (Tredaghs)
LCF	15	Tom Burke (Drogheda Stars)

=== Munster ===
Munster Senior Football Championship

7 June 1914
Quarter-Final

Tipperary	4–4 – 0–4	Limerick

Waterford
Referee: J. Corbett (W )

21 June 1914
Quarter-Final

Kerry	3–6 – 2–0	Clare

Ennis

14 June 1914
Semi-Final

Cork	0–3 – 0–2	Waterford

Cork Athletic Grounds

13 September 1914
Semi-Final

Kerry	2–3 – 0–2	Tipperary

Dungarvan
Referee: A. Quillinan (Limerick)

4 October 1914
Final

Kerry	0–5 – 0–1	Cork

Tralee

=== Ulster ===
Ulster Senior Football Championship

24 May 1914
Quarter-Final

Armagh	2–5 – 0–0	Down

Newry

21 June 1914
Quarter-Final

Fermanagh	2–4 – 1–2	Tyrone

Clones

21 June 1914
Quarter-Final

Monaghan	3–2 – 0–3	Derry

Derry

4 July 1914
Quarter-Final

Cavan	2–3 – 1–2	Antrim

Clones

26 July 1914
Semi-Final

Fermanagh	2–1 – 0–4	Cavan

Clones

2 August 1914
Semi-Final

Monaghan	0–0 – 0–0	Armagh

Carrickmacross

16 August 1914
Semi-Final Replay

Monaghan	1–1 – 0–2	Armagh

Culleville

23 August 1914
Final

Monaghan	2–4 – 0–2	Fermanagh

Newbliss

=== Semi-finals ===
6 September 1914
Semi-Final

Kerry	2–4 – 0–1	Roscommon

Portlaoise

13 September 1914
Semi-Final

Wexford	2–6 – 0–1	Monaghan

Croke Park, Dublin

=== Final ===
14 November 1914
Final

Kerry	1–3 – 2–0	Wexford

Croke Park, Dublin
Attendance: 13,000
Referee: Harry Boland (Dublin)

29 November 1914
Final Replay

Kerry	2–3 – 0–6	Wexford

Croke Park, Dublin
Attendance: 20,000
Referee: Harry Boland (Dublin)

== Statistics ==
=== Miscellaneous ===
- Kerry win a second two in a row as All-Ireland champions.
