= Frank Furlong =

Wexford Gaelic footballer

Personal information
- Native name: Proinsias Furlong (Irish)
- Born: 8 February 1887 Wexford, Ireland
- Died: 26 February 1952 (aged 65) Wexford, Ireland
- Occupations: Butcher and cattle dealer
- Height: 5 ft 8 in (173 cm)

Sport
- Sport: Gaelic football
Club
- Years: Club
- Blues and Whites
Club titles
- Wexford titles: 2
Inter-county
- Years: County
- 1913–1917: Wexford
Inter-county titles
- Leinster titles: 4
- All-Irelands: 3

Francis Furlong (8 February 1887 – 26 February 1952) was an Irish Gaelic footballer. His championship career with the Wexford senior team lasted five seasons from 1913 until 1917.

== Honours ==
Wexford

- All-Ireland Senior Football Championship (3): 1915, 1916, 1917
- Leinster Senior Football Championship (4): 1913, 1915, 1916, 1917
