= Edmund Wheeler =

Wexford Gaelic footballer

Personal information
- Native name: Éamonn Ó Faoláir (Irish)
- Born: 29 March 1889 Wexford, Ireland
- Died: 14 November 1961 (aged 72) Waterford, Ireland
- Occupation: Roman Catholic priest

Sport
- Sport: Gaelic football
- Position: Full-back
Club
- Years: Club
- Blues and Whites
Club titles
- Wexford titles: 2
Inter-county
- Years: County
- 1910–1917: Wexford
Inter-county titles
- Leinster titles: 4
- All-Irelands: 3

Edmund Wheeler (29 March 1889 – 14 November 1961) was an Irish Gaelic footballer. His championship career with the Wexford senior team spanned eight seasons from 1910 until 1917.

== Honours ==
Blues and Whites

- Wexford Senior Football Championship (2): 1914, 1916

Wexford

- All-Ireland Senior Football Championship (2): 1915, 1916
- Leinster Senior Football Championship (2): 1915, 1916
