= 1918 All-Ireland Senior Football Championship =

All-Ireland Champions
- Winning team: Wexford (5th win)
- Captain: Jim Byrne

All-Ireland Finalists
- Losing team: Tipperary

Provincial Champions
- Munster: Tipperary
- Leinster: Wexford
- Ulster: Cavan
- Connacht: Mayo

Championship statistics

The 1918 All-Ireland Senior Football Championship was the 32nd staging of Ireland's premier Gaelic football knock-out competition. Wexford won a record fourth title in a row, an achievement which had never been completed.

== Results ==
=== Connacht Senior Football Championship ===
==== Quarter-final ====
30 June 1918 Quarter-final	Roscommon	0–5 – 1–4	Leitrim	Elphin

==== Semi-finals ====
18 August 1918 Semi-final

Mayo	1–6 – 1–0	Sligo

Swinford

25 August 1918
Semi-final

Galway	1–5 – 1–0	Leitrim

Elphin

==== Final ====
22 September 1918 Final	Mayo	0–4 – 0–1	Galway	Castlerea

=== Leinster Senior Football Championship ===
==== Preliminary round ====
June 1918 Preliminary round	Westmeath	3–3 – 0–3	Longford	Edgeworthstown

June 1918 Preliminary round	Louth	1–4 – 0–3	Meath	Drogheda

30 June 1918 Preliminary round	Wexford	2–2 – 0–3	Laois	Portlaoise

1918 Preliminary round	Carlow	4–3 – 0–1	Wicklow	Ferns

==== Quarter-finals ====
2 June 1918 Quarter-final	Wexford	2–6 – 0–1	Kilkenny	New Ross

23 June 1918 Quarter-final	Westmeath	4–4 – 1–2	Offaly	Rochfort Bridge

8 September 1918 Quarter-final	Louth	3–5 – 3–3	Dublin	Shamrock Lodge, Drogheda
		Report		Attendance: 2,000; Referee: Mr P Duffy

13 October 1918 Quarter-final	Kildare	4–2 – 0–3	Westmeath	Croke Park, Dublin

==== Semi-finals ====
22 September 1918 Semi-final	Wexford	5–8 – 2–2	Carlow	Enniscorthy

27 October 1918 Semi-final	Kildare	0–1 – 0–7	Louth	Croke Park, Dublin
				Attendance: 5,000 – 6,000

==== Final ====
19 January 1919 Final	Wexford	2–5 – 1–4	Louth	Croke Park, Dublin
	G. O'Kennedy 1–2, J. Byrne 0–2 (1f), J. Redmond 1–0, R. Reynolds 0–1		N. Butterly 1–2 (all frees), N. Murphy, A. Tipping 0–1 each	Attendance: 10,000; Referee: Maurice J. Collins (Dublin)

GK	1	Tom McGrath (Blue and Whites)
RCB	2	Nick Stewart (Murrintown)
FB	3	Paddy Mackey (New Ross Geraldines)
LCB	4	Jem Byrne (Fethard) (c)
RHB	5	Tom Murphy (Starlights)
CHB	6	Tom Doyle (Ballyhogue and Davidstown)
LHB	7	Martin Howlett (Gusserane and Campile United)
MF	8	Bill Hodgins (Brideswell)
MF	9	John Doran (Ballyhogue and Davidstown)
RHF	10	Jack Crowley (Blue and Whites)
CHF	11	Rich Reynolds (Blue and Whites)
LHF	12	Pierse Todd (UCD, Dublin)
RCF	13	Aidan Doyle (New Ross Geraldines)
FF	14	Gus O'Kennedy (New Ross Geraldines)
LCF	15	Jim Redmond (Enniscorthy Volunteers)

GK	1	Willie Donough (Drogheda Stars)
RCB	2	John Clarke (Tredaghs)
FB	3	Jack Murray (Drogheda Stars)
LCB	4	Peter Kiely (Éamonn Ceannt's)
RHB	5	Jim Smith (Tredaghs)
CHB	6	Nick Butterly (Drogheda Stars)
LHB	7	Pat Balfe (Tredaghs)
MF	8	Larry McCormack (Tredaghs)
MF	9	Paddy Lambe (Drogheda Stars)
RHF	10	Eoin Markey (Éamonn Ceannt's)
CHF	11	Tom Burke (Drogheda Stars) (c)
LHF	12	Joe Burke (Drogheda Stars)
RCF	13	Nick Murphy (Drogheda Stars)
FF	14	Andy Tipping (Dundalk O'Rahilly's)
LCF	15	Frank Byrne (Tredaghs)
Substitutes used:
	16	Larry Feehan (Dundalk Young Irelands)
	17	Jim Morgan (Dundalk Young Irelands)

=== Munster Senior Football Championship ===
==== Quarter-finals ====
1918 Quarter-final	Waterford	won – lost	Limerick

2 June 1918 Quarter-final	Tipperary	1–5 – 0–2	Cork	Thurles
				Referee: A. Quillinan (Limerick)

==== Semi-finals ====
21 July 1918 Semi-final	Tipperary	4–4 – 0–0	Waterford	Clonmel

25 August 1918 Semi-final	Kerry	5–3 – 1–3	Clare	Limerick

==== Final ====
22 September 1918 Final	Tipperary	1–1 – 0–1	Kerry	Cork Athletic Grounds
				Referee: M. Mehigan (Cork)

=== Ulster Senior Football Championship ===
==== Quarter-finals ====
28 April 1918 Quarter-final	Antrim	4–1 – 2–4	Derry	Belfast

5 May 1918 Quarter-final	Armagh	0–5 – 0–4	Down	Camlough

26 May 1918 Quarter-final	Cavan	1–4 – 1–2	Fermanagh	Belturbet

9 June 1918 Quarter-final	Monaghan	4–4 – 1–0	Tyrone	Armagh

==== Semi-finals ====
30 June 1918 Semi-final	Antrim	1–2 – 0–3	Monaghan	Armagh

18 August 1918 Semi-final collapsible	Cavan	2–4 – 0–0	Armagh	Cootehill
				Attendance: 3,000

==== Final ====
15 September 1918 Final	Cavan	3–2 – 0–0	Antrim	Belturbet

=== All-Ireland Senior Football Championship ===
==== Semi-finals ====
By the time the semi-final was to be played, the Leinster championship was not finished, so Louth were nominated to represent Leinster. When Wexford beat Louth in the Leinster final, they were given Louth's place in the All-Ireland final.

20 October 1918 Semi-final	Louth	2–4 – 0–4	Cavan	Belturbet

1 December 1918 Semi-final	Tipperary	2–2 – 1–4	Mayo	Croke Park, Dublin
				Referee: J. McGrath

==== Final ====
16 February 1919 Final	Wexford	0–5 – 0–4	Tipperary	Croke Park, Dublin
	J. Redmond, P. Todd 0-2 each, J. Byrne 0-1.		G. McCarthy 0-2, J. Skinner, T. Ryan 0-1 each.	Attendance: 12,000; Referee: Patrick Dunphy (Laois)

== Statistics ==
=== Miscellaneous ===
- Due to Spanish flu most games were delayed.
- Wexford become the first county to win the Leinster football title for a sixth year in a row and the All-Ireland football title for a fourth year in a row.

== Roll of Honour ==
- Dublin – 11 (1908)
- Wexford – 5 (1918)
- Kerry – 5 (1914)
- Tipperary – 3 (1900)
- Limerick – 2 (1896)
- Cork – 2 (1911)
- Louth – 2 (1912)
- Kildare – 1 (1905)
