= 1913 All-Ireland Senior Football Championship =

Football championship

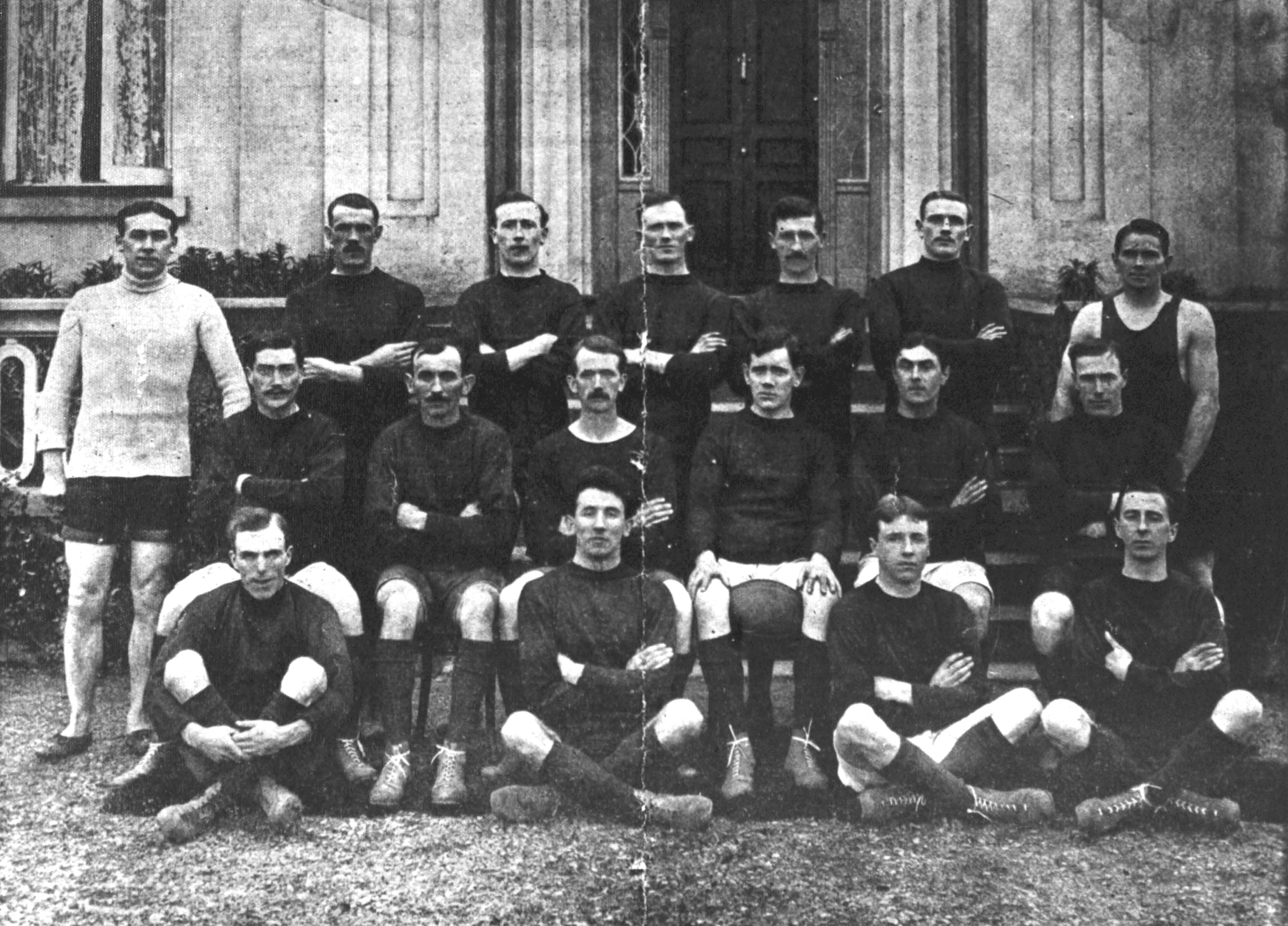

All-Ireland Champions
- Winning team: Kerry (4th win)
- Captain: Dick Fitzgerald

All-Ireland Finalists
- Losing team: Wexford

Provincial Champions
- Munster: Kerry
- Leinster: Wexford
- Ulster: Antrim
- Connacht: Galway

Championship statistics

The 1913 All-Ireland Senior Football Championship was the 27th staging of Ireland's premier Gaelic football knock-out competition. In the Leinster final Wexford ended Louth's day as All Ireland champions. Kerry were the winners.

== Results ==
=== Connacht ===
Connacht Senior Football Championship

15 June 1913
Quarter-Final

Sligo	2–1 – 1–1	Leitrim

Boyle
Attendance: 1,000

13 July 1913
Semi-Final

Galway	1–6 – 0–2	Roscommon

Athenry

10 August 1913
Semi-Final

Sligo	1–2 – 3–4	Mayo

Sligo

28 September 1913
Final

Galway	1–2 – 0–3	Mayo

Castlerea

=== Leinster ===
Leinster Senior Football Championship

Note for 1 year London took part and hosted Louth.

1913
Preliminary round

Laois	1–1 – 0–3	Wicklow

Jones' Road, Dublin

1913
Preliminary round

Louth	3–5 – 1–2	London

London

6 July 1913
Quarter-Final

Louth	2–5 – 0–1	Kilkenny

Jones' Road, Dublin

6 July 1913
Quarter-Final

Dublin	2–2 – 2–1	Kildare

Jones' Road, Dublin

20 July 1913
Quarter-Final

Meath	1–4 – 0–3	Offaly

Jones' Road, Dublin
Referee: Fred Cooney

11 August 1913
Quarter-Final

Wexford	1–4 – 1–3	Laois

Jones' Road, Dublin

1913
Semi-Final

Louth	2–3 – 0–2	Meath

Dundalk

24 August 1913
Semi-Final

Wexford	2–3 – 1–0	Dublin

Wexford Park, Wexford

21 September 1913
Final

Wexford	2–3 – 2–2	Louth

Jones' Road, Dublin
Referee: Jack Fitzgerald (Kildare)

GK	1	Jim Cullen (Rapparees)
RCB	2	Paddy Mackey (New Ross Geraldines)
FB	3	Tom Mernagh (Ballyhogue and Davidstown)
LCB	4	Tom Murphy (Rapparees)
RHB	5	Ned Black (Rapparees)
CHB	6	Tom Doyle (Ballyhogue and Davidstown)
LHB	7	Jem Byrne (Blue and Whites)
MF	8	Frank Furlong (Blue and Whites)
MF	9	Johnny Doyle (Rapparees)
RHF	10	Joe Mullally (Blue and Whites)
CHF	11	Rich Reynolds (Blue and Whites)
LHF	12	Aidan Doyle (Ballyhogue and Davidstown)
RCF	13	Seán O'Kennedy (New Ross Geraldines) (c)
FF	14	Gus O'Kennedy (New Ross Geraldines)
LCF	15	Jim Rossiter (St John's Volunteers)

GK	1	Patrick Gorman (Tredaghs)
RCB	2	John Clarke (Tredaghs)
FB	3	John J. Kirwan (Geraldines)
LCB	4	Pat Carroll (Dundalk Young Irelands)
RHB	5	Matt Conachy (Geraldines)
CHB	6	Jim Smith (Tredaghs)
LHB	7	Eddie Burke (Tredaghs)
MF	8	Larry McCormack (Tredaghs) (c)
MF	9	Eoin Markey (Ardee St Mochta's)
RHF	10	Joe Johnston (Geraldines)
CHF	11	Joe Quinn (Tredaghs)
LHF	12	Paddy Reilly (Tredaghs)
RCF	13	Johnny Brennan (Dundalk Rangers)
FF	14	Pat Harlin (Ardee St Mochta's)
LCF	15	Tom Morgan (Tredaghs)

=== Munster ===
Munster Senior Football Championship

25 May 1913
Quarter-Final

Kerry	2–2 – 0–1	Clare

Ennis

22 June 1913
Quarter-Final

Tipperary	2–4 – 1–1	Waterford

Thurles
Referee: J. Purcell (L)

24 August 1913
Semi-Final

Cork	3–3 – 0–3	Limerick

Tipperary

31 August 1913
Semi-Final

Kerry	0–2 – 0–2	Tipperary

Cork Athletic Grounds
Referee: M. Mehigan ( C )

12 October 1913
Semi-Final Replay

Kerry	0–5 – 1–0	Tipperary

Fermoy
Referee: P. Kenny (Clare)

26 October 1913
Final

Kerry	1–6 – 0–1	Cork

Cork Athletic Grounds

=== Ulster ===
Ulster Senior Football Championship

15 June 1913
Quarter-Final

Antrim	1–6 – 0–3	Down

Belfast

22 June 1913
Quarter-Final

Fermanagh	1–3 – 1–1	Armagh

Monaghan

15 June 1913
Semi-Final

Monaghan	2–0 – 1–3	Cavan

Cavan

20 July 1913
Semi-Final Replay

Monaghan	0–3 – 0–2	Cavan

Cootehill
Attendance: 2,000

31 August 1913
Semi-Final

Antrim	1–4 – 1–3	Fermanagh

Clones

21 September 1913
Final

Antrim	2–1 – 1–2	Monaghan

Newbliss

=== Semi-finals ===
5 October 1913
Semi-Final

Wexford	4–4 – 0–1	Antrim

Jones' Road, Dublin

9 November 1913
Semi-Final

Kerry	1–8 – 0–1	Galway

Portlaoise

=== Final ===
14 December 1913
Final

Kerry	2–2 – 0–3	Wexford

Jones' Road, Dublin
Attendance: 17,000
Referee: M. F. Crowe (Dublin)

== Statistics ==
=== Miscellaneous ===
- The 1913 Lockout affected some games in the competition.
- All-Ireland champions Louth hosted London in the Leinster championship.
