= Bill Hodgins =

Irish Gaelic footballer

William Hodgins
Personal information
- Native name: Liam Mac Hoisticín (Irish)
- Born: 29 December 1894 Wexford, Ireland
- Died: 25 June 1920 (aged 25) Dublin, Ireland
- Occupation: Farmer

Sport
- Sport: Gaelic football
Club
- Years: Club
- Brideswell
Club titles
- Wexford titles: 0
Inter-county
- Years: County
- 1917–1920: Wexford
Inter-county titles
- Leinster titles: 2
- All-Irelands: 2

William Hodgins (29 December 1894 – 25 June 1920) was an Irish Gaelic footballer. His championship career with the Wexford senior team lasted four seasons from 1917 until 1920.

== Honours ==
Wexford

- All-Ireland Senior Football Championship (2): 1917, 1918
- Leinster Senior Football Championship (2): 1917, 1918
