= Redmond Barry (sportsman) =

Irish hurler and Gaelic footballer

Personal information
- Born: Wexford, Ireland
- Height: 1.3 m (4 ft 3 in)

Sport
- Football Position: Left half forward
- Hurling Position: Centre forward
Clubs
- Years: Club
- St Anne's Rathangan GAA; UCD
Club titles
	Football	Hurling
Wexford titles	3	1
College
- Years: College
- UCD
College titles
- Fitzgibbon titles: 1
Inter-county
- Years: County
- 2002–2005 2001–2013: Wexford (H); Wexford (F)
Inter-county titles
	Football	Hurling
Leinster Titles	0	1
All-Ireland Titles	0	0
League titles	1 (Div 3)	0
All-Stars	0	0

Redmond Barry is an Irish dual player from County Wexford. He has played with both the Wexford Gaelic football and hurling teams.

In 2005 Barry helped Wexford GAA to a Div 1 National Football League final for the first time in over 50 years but lost out to Armagh on the day. In 2008 Wexford were back in the National League final, this time in Div 3, which they won. They later made it to the Leinster Final for the first time since the 1950s and the All Ireland Semi Final for the first time since the 1940s.

Barry plays at club level with the St Anne's club and has won County Championships in both football and hurling. He has also played with UCD and won a Dublin Hurling Championship with them.

In November 2013, Barry announced his retirement from inter-county football.

In 2014 he joined the Wexford Intermediate hurling team, where scored the winning goal against Kilkenny in the Leinster final.

== Honours ==
- Leinster Senior Hurling Championship (1): 2004
- Fitzgibbon Cup (1): 2001
- Wexford Senior Hurling Championship (1): 2000
- Wexford Senior Football Championship (3): 2000, 2001, 2012
- Dublin Senior Hurling Championship (1): 2000
