= Jim Byrne (Gaelic footballer) =

Irish Gaelic footballer

Personal information
- Native name: Séamus Ó Broin (Irish)
- Born: 15 April 1890 Ballymurphy, County Carlow, Ireland
- Died: Unknown
- Occupation: National school teacher

Sport
- Sport: Gaelic football
- Position: Left corner-back
Club
- Years: Club
- Geraldine O'Hanrahan's
Club titles
- Wexford titles: 0
Inter-county
- Years: County
- 1913–1925: Wexford
Inter-county titles
- Leinster titles: 7
- All-Irelands: 4

James Byrne (born 15 April 1890) was an Irish Gaelic football administrator, referee and player who had a lengthy career as a left corner-back with the Wexford senior team. He joined the team in 1913 and was a regular member of the starting fifteen until 1925.

Kennelly is regarded as one of Wexford's greatest-ever players. He won four consecutive All-Ireland SFC winners' medals and seven Leinster SFC winners' medals. An All-Ireland SFC runner-up on two occasions, Byrne captained the team to the 1918 All-Ireland SFC title.

At club level Byrne had a lengthy career with Geraldine O'Hanrahan's.

Sporting positions
Preceded by Seán O'Kennedy	Wexford Senior Football Captain; 1918	Succeeded by
Achievements
Preceded by Seán O'Kennedy (Wexford)	All-Ireland SFC winning captain 1918	Succeeded by Larry Stanley (Kildare)
