= 1916 All-Ireland Senior Football Championship =

All-Ireland Champions
- Winning team: Wexford (3rd win)
- Captain: Seán O'Kennedy

All-Ireland Finalists
- Losing team: Mayo
- Captain: D. F. Courell

Provincial Champions
- Munster: Cork
- Leinster: Wexford
- Ulster: Monaghan
- Connacht: Mayo

Championship statistics

The 1916 All-Ireland Senior Football Championship was the 30th staging of Ireland's premier Gaelic football knock-out competition. Wexford won the second title of their four-in-a-row.

== Results ==
=== Connacht ===
Connacht Senior Football Championship

13 August 1916
Quarter-Final

Leitrim	2–2 – 0–3	Sligo

Boyle

27 August 1916
Semi-Final

Leitrim	0–2 – 1–2	Roscommon

Elphin

3 September 1916
Semi-Final

Mayo	2–6 – 2–2	Galway

Athlone

1 October 1916
Final

Mayo	1–5 – 0–3	Roscommon

Castlerea
Attendance: 4,000

=== Leinster ===
Leinster Senior Football Championship

23 July 1916
Preliminary Round

Meath	1–2 – 0–4	Laois

Croke Park, Dublin

1916
Quarter-Final

Kilkenny	2–2 – 0–5	Westmeath

Croke Park, Dublin

23 July 1916
Quarter-Final

Kildare	3–3 – 1–4	Louth

Croke Park, Dublin

3 September 1916
Quarter-Final

Wexford	Wexford win in a walkover	Dublin

Wexford Park, Wexford

10 September 1916
Semi-Final

Kildare	1–6 – 1–3	Kilkenny

Barrett's Park, New Ross

24 September 1916
Semi-Final

Wexford	6–5 – 1–2	Meath

Croke Park, Dublin

15 October 1916
Final

Wexford	1–7 – 1–0	Kildare

Croke Park, Dublin
Attendance: 7,000
Referee: Patrick Dunphy (Laois)

=== Munster ===
Munster Senior Football Championship

9 July 1916
Quarter-Final

Kerry	2–2 – 0–1	Tipperary

Cork Athletic Grounds
Referee: T. Irwin (Cork)

Kerry withdrew from the Munster Championship after this victory.

30 July 1916
Semi-Final

Cork	4–3 – 2–4	Waterford

Cork Athletic Grounds

30 July 1916
Semi-Final

Clare	3–1 – 0–0	Limerick

Listowel

3 September 1916
Final

Cork	2–2 – 1–4	Clare

Clonmel

=== Ulster ===
Ulster Senior Football Championship

18 June 1916
Quarter-Final

Antrim	W – L	Armagh

Camlough

25 June 1916
Quarter-Final

Cavan	2–3 – 0–1	Fermanagh

Wattlebridge

7 July 1916
Quarter-Final

Monaghan	2–5 – 0–1	Derry

Clones

20 August 1916
Semi-Final

Monaghan	4–3 – 1–5	Cavan

Belturbet

27 August 1916
Semi-Final

Antrim	1–3 – 1–0	Down

Portaferry

24 September 1916
Final

Monaghan	2–3 – 0–2	Antrim

Clones

=== Semi-finals ===
22 October 1916
Semi-Final

Wexford	0–9 – 1–1	Monaghan

Carrickmacross

22 October 1916
Semi-Final

Mayo	1–2 – 0–2	Cork

Athlone

Cork made an objection and a replay was ordered.

19 November 1916
Semi-Final Replay

Mayo	1–2 – 1–1	Cork

Croke Park, Dublin

=== Final ===
17 December 1916
Final

Wexford	3–4 – 1–2	Mayo

Croke Park, Dublin
Attendance: 3,000
Referee: Pat Dunphy (Laois)

== Statistics ==
=== Miscellaneous ===
- Mayo play in a first All-Ireland final, but lose to Wexford.
