= 1917 All-Ireland Senior Football Championship =

All-Ireland Champions
- Winning team: Wexford (4th win)
- Captain: Seán O'Kennedy

All-Ireland Finalists
- Losing team: Clare

Provincial Champions
- Munster: Clare
- Leinster: Wexford
- Ulster: Monaghan
- Connacht: Galway

Championship statistics

The 1917 All-Ireland Senior Football Championship was the 31st staging of Ireland's premier Gaelic football knock-out competition. Wexford won the third title of their four-in-a-row.

== Results ==
=== Connacht ===
Connacht Senior Football Championship

1 July 1917
Quarter-Final

Roscommon	2–3 – 1–0	Leitrim

Elphin

5 August 1917
Semi-Final

Mayo	0–3 – 0–0	Sligo

Tubbercurry

12 August 1917
Semi-Final

Galway	1–4 – 1–0	Roscommon

Mountbellew

7 October 1917
Final

Galway	1–4 – 1–1	Mayo

Castlerea

=== Leinster ===
Leinster Senior Football Championship

1917
Round 1

Longford	2–2 – 4–5	Westmeath

Mostrim

1917
Round 1

Louth	2–7 – 0–2	Wicklow

Wexford

1917
Round 2

Laois	2–7 – 0–2	Carlow

Carlow

1917
Round 2

Louth	1–4 – 0–14	Dublin

Drogheda

1917
Quarter-Final

Louth	2–7 – 0–0	Meath

Navan

1 July 1917
Quarter-Final

Laois	2–7 – 0–0	Offaly

Tullamore
Referee: J Fitzgerald

8 July 1917
Quarter-Final

Dublin	2–1 – 1–6	Kildare

Newbridge

16 July 1917
Quarter-Final

Wexford	6–4 – 0–2	Wicklow

Wexford Park, Wexford

13 August 1917
Semi-Final

Wexford	1–7 – 0–1	Westmeath

Croke Park, Dublin

1917
Semi-Final

Dublin	0–5 – 0–3	Laois

Croke Park, Dublin

14 October 1917
Final

Wexford	1–3 – 1–1	Dublin

Croke Park, Dublin
Attendance: 7,000
Referee: A Rogers (Louth)

=== Munster ===
Munster Senior Football Championship

15 July 1917
Quarter-Final

Clare	2–6 – 0–3	Waterford

Waterford

22 July 1917
Quarter-Final

Tipperary	Won –	Kerry

Charleville

8 July 1917
Semi-Final

Cork	1–1 – 0–0	Limerick

Markets Field, Limerick

26 August 1917
Semi-Final

Clare	0–5 – 0–4	Tipperary

Markets Field, Limerick
Referee: T. Irwin (Cork)

14 October 1917
Final

Clare	5–4 – 0–1	Cork

Tipperary

=== Ulster ===
Ulster Senior Football Championship

13 May 1917
Quarter-Final

Antrim	2–2 – 0–4	Down

Downpatrick

13 May 1917
Quarter-Final

Cavan	2–5 – 0–2	Derry

Derry

13 May 1917
Quarter-Final

Monaghan	1–2 – 0–3	Fermanagh

Wattlebridge

13 May 1917
Quarter-Final

Armagh	0–9 – 0–6	Tyrone

Armagh

17 June 1917
Semi-Final

Antrim	2–4 – 1–5	Armagh

Armagh

An objection was made and a replay ordered.

1 July 1917
Semi-Final

Monaghan	3–1 – 0–2	Cavan

Cootehill

12 August 1917
Semi-Final Replay

Armagh	0–5 – 0–3	Antrim

Belfast

28 October 1917
Final

Monaghan	4–2 – 0–4	Armagh

Clones

=== Semi-finals ===
18 November 1917
Semi-Final

Clare	2–1 – 0–5	Galway

Athlone

18 November 1917
Semi-Final

Wexford	6–6 – 1–3	Monaghan

Wexford

=== Final ===
9 December 1917
Final

Wexford	0–9 – 0–5	Clare

Croke Park, Dublin
Attendance: 6,500
Referee: Pat Dunphy (Laois)

== Statistics ==
=== Miscellaneous ===
- Clare win a first Munster football title.
- Wexford become Leinster champions for a fifth year in a row and the second county (after Dublin) to win the All-Ireland football title for a third year in a row.
