= 1915 All-Ireland Senior Football Championship =

All-Ireland Champions
- Winning team: Wexford (2nd win)
- Captain: Seán O'Kennedy

All-Ireland Finalists
- Losing team: Kerry
- Captain: Dick Fitzgerald

Provincial Champions
- Munster: Kerry
- Leinster: Wexford
- Ulster: Cavan
- Connacht: Mayo

Championship statistics

The 1915 All-Ireland Senior Football Championship was the 29th staging of Ireland's premier Gaelic football knock-out competition. Wexford won the first title of their four-in-a-row. They ended Kerry's bid for 3 in a row until 1931.

== Results ==
=== Connacht ===
Connacht Senior Football Championship

4 July 1915
Quarter-Final

Sligo	1–2 – 1–1	Leitrim

Carrick-on-Shannon

15 August 1915
Semi-Final

Roscommon	1–2 – 0–1	Sligo

Boyle

12 September 1915
Semi-Final

Mayo	3–3 – 0–3	Galway

Athlone

26 September 1915
Final

Roscommon	0–3 – 3–1	Mayo

Castlerea
Attendance: 5,000

=== Leinster ===
Leinster Senior Football Championship

1915
Preliminary Round

Dublin	1–2 – 1–2	Laois

Croke Park, Dublin

1915
Preliminary Round Replay

Dublin	1–8 – 0–2	Laois

Newbridge

23 May 1915
Preliminary Round

Louth	0–4 – 0–1	Carllow

Croke Park, Dublin

23 May 1915
Preliminary Round

Kildare	1–6 – 1–2	Wicklow

Croke Park, Dublin

20 June 1915
Quarter-Final

Offaly	2–5 – 0–4	Meath

Croke Park, Dublin
Referee: TF O Reilly

27 June 1915
Quarter-Final

Wexford	0–9 – 0–5	Kilkenny

Waterford

8 August 1915
Quarter-Final

Dublin	1–2 – 0–1	Kildare

Croke Park, Dublin

1915
Semi-Final

Dublin	2–2 – 0–3	Louth

Navan

18 July 1915
Semi-Final

Wexford	1–7 – 0–2	Offaly

Croke Park, Dublin
Referee: J Conlan

12 September 1915
Final

Wexford	2–2 – 2–2	Dublin

Croke Park, Dublin

10 October 1915
Final Replay

Wexford	3–5 – 1–3	Dublin

Croke Park, Dublin
Attendance: 13,000
Referee: Patrick Dunphy (Laois)

=== Munster ===
Munster Senior Football Championship

18 April 1915
Quarter-Final

Kerry	4–3 – 0–2	Limerick

Markets Field, Limerick

9 May 1915
Quarter-Final

Tipperary	2–3 – 1–1	Cork

Waterford
Referee: J. McDonnell (K)

23 May 1915
Semi-Final

Clare	2–4 – 1–2	Waterford

Fermoy
Referee: A Quinlan (Limerick)

12 September 1915
Semi-Final

Kerry	1–6 – 0–2	Tipperary

Cork Athletic Grounds
Referee: T. Irwin (Cork)

17 October 1915
Final

Kerry	4–3 – 0–1	Clare

Tipperary
Referee: A Quinlan (Limerick)

=== Ulster ===
Ulster Senior Football Championship

30 May 1915
Quarter-Final

Cavan	1–3 – 0–2	Antrim

Wattlebridge

An objection was made and a replay ordered.

13 June 1915
Quarter-Final

Fermanagh	1–2 – 1–1	Monaghan

Clones

11 July 1915
Quarter-Final

Armagh	1–7 – 1–3	Down

Newry

18 July 1915
Quarter-Final Replay

Cavan	0–3 – 0–1	Antrim

Wattlebridge

1 August 1915
Semi-Final

Cavan	0–9 – 0–4	Armagh

Newbliss

8 August 1915
Semi-Final

Monaghan	5–2 – 2–0	Fermanagh

Belturbet

22 August 1915
Final

Cavan	2–5 – 3–2	Monaghan

Belturbet

2 September 1915
Final Replay

Cavan	0–4 – 0–3	Monaghan

Clones

=== Semi-finals ===
19 September 1915
Semi-Final

Kerry	2–3 – 1–1	Roscommon

O'Moore Park, Portlaoise
Referee: Pat Dunphy (Laois)

17 October 1915
Semi-Final

Wexford	3–7 – 2–2	Cavan

Croke Park, Dublin

=== Final ===
7 November 1915
Final

Wexford	2–4 – 2–1	Kerry

Croke Park, Dublin
Attendance: 27,000
Referee: Pat Dunphy (Laois)

== Statistics ==
=== Miscellaneous ===
- Wexford win a second All-Ireland football title and a first since 1893.
