= Paddy Mackey (dual player) =

Irish Gaelic footballer and hurler

Personal information
- Native name: Pádraig Mac Aodha (Irish)
- Born: Inistioge, County Kilkenny

Sport
- Football Position: Half-back
- Hurling Position: Half-back
Club
- Years: Club
- New Ross Geraldines
Club titles
- Wexford titles: 2
- Leinster titles: 4
Inter-county
- Years: County
- 1907–1918 1913–1918: Wexford (F); Wexford (H)
Inter-county titles
	Football	Hurling
Leinster Titles	6	2
All-Ireland Titles	4	1

Paddy Mackey (1889 – 29 January 1948) was an Irish dual player. He played both hurling and Gaelic football with the New Ross Geraldines and with the Wexford senior inter-county teams in both codes in the 1900s and 1910s. He played in six consecutive All-Ireland Senior Football finals, winning four. Together with his team mate and contemporary Seán O'Kennedy, he is one of two Wexford players to have won All-Ireland medals in both hurling and football.

== Playing career ==
=== Club ===
Originally from County Kilkenny, after moving to County Wexford, Mackey played club hurling and football with his local club, the New Ross Geraldines. In 1913, he won a senior Wexford Senior Hurling Championship title. Two years later, in 1915, Mackey added to his collection when he won a Wexford Senior Football Championship title.

=== Inter-county ===
As a member of the Wexford county hurling team, he won his first Leinster Senior Hurling Championship (SHC) title in 1910 as Wexford overcame Dublin by 3–3 to 1–1. Unusually, the All-Ireland series of games began before the provincial championships were completed. As a result of this, Kilkenny and Dublin represented Leinster in the All-Ireland Senior Hurling Championship (SHC) quarter-final and semi-final respectively; however, Wexford lined out in the subsequent All-Ireland SHC final against Limerick. New rules regarding the parallelogram confused the players and Limerick had two goals disallowed because of a 'square ball'. Wexford had a goal disallowed for the same reason; however, they still went on to win the game by 7–0 to 6–2. It was Mackey’s first All-Ireland SHC medal.

Three years after this, Mackey was a star player on the Wexford senior football team. He won a Leinster Senior Football Championship (SFC) title in 1913, with a one-point victory over Louth. Wexford later defeated Antrim to set up an All-Ireland Senior Football Championship (SFC) final meeting with Kerry. After a low-scoring contest, Kerry were victorious on a score-line of 2–2 to 0–3.

Mackey captured a second Leinster SFC medal in 1914 as Wexford beat Louth in the provincial decider. Monaghan were also defeated by Wexford in the penultimate game of the championship, allowing Wexford to advance to a second successive All-Ireland SFC final. Kerry were the opponents once again. While Wexford led by 0–6 to 0–1, Kerry fought back to secure a 1–3 to 0–6 draw. The replay drew a crowd of 20,000 to Croke Park and, once again, Wexford took the lead. Kerry fought back again and went on to win the game by 2–3 to 0–6.

1915 saw Mackey add a third Leinster SFC title to his collection after two matches against Dublin. After defeating Cavan in the All-Ireland SFC semi-final, Wexford lined out against Kerry in the championship decider. It was the third successive meeting of these two teams with Kerry looking for a third title in-a-row. In the end, Mackey's Wexford side won by 2-4 to 2-1. It was his first All-Ireland SFC medal. On that occasion Mackey, along with his teammate Seán O'Kennedy, jointly became the fourth players in history to have All-Ireland medals in both hurling and football.

Wexford continued their winning ways in 1916 with Mackey collecting a fourth successive Leinster SFC title. Kildare were defeated on that occasion; however, Mackey ended up on the losing side in the Leinster hurling decider. Wexford later qualified for a fourth successive All-Ireland SFC final. Because of the Easter Rising and subsequent martial law, the game was postponed until the Sunday before Christmas. Overnight frost resulted in the pitch being extremely hard; however, the game went ahead nonetheless. Mayo were Wexford's opponents on the occasion, in a game which Wexford won by 2–4 to 1–2. It was Mackey’s second All-Ireland SFC medal.

Wexford maintained their provincial dominance in 1917, with Mackey winning a fifth Leinster SFC title following a two-point win over Dublin. Once again the All-Ireland SFC final beckoned with Clare providing the opposition on this occasion. Wexford went on win, on a score-line of 0–9 to 0–5, giving Mackey a third consecutive All-Ireland SFC medal.

1918 proved to be another successful year for Mackey in both codes. At provincial level, Wexford defeated Louth by four points and Mackey won his sixth consecutive Leinster football medal. He also had success on the hurling field that year as Wexford defeated Dublin, giving Mackey a second Leinster hurling title. Both the Wexford hurlers and Wexford footballers were successful in the subsequent series of games and reached the All-Ireland final. The All-Ireland football final saw Wexford take on Tipperary. A close-scoring game saw Wexford just about secure a victory by 0–5 to 0–4. It was Mackey's fourth All-Ireland medal and a record fourth title in-a-row for Wexford. The All-Ireland hurling final also gave Wexford the chance of joining Cork and Tipperary in the unique situation of being double All-Ireland winners. That game saw Limerick provide the opposition; however, the Wexford hurlers were not able to match Limerick's scoring skills. A score line of 9–5 to 1–3 gave victory to Limerick.

A seventh Leinster football title in-a-row proved beyond this Wexford team, while the hurlers also gave up their provincial crown. Mackey retired from inter-county activities shortly afterwards.

Mackey, who married in 1923 and had three children, died in January 1948 and was buried in St Stephen's cemetery, New Ross.
