= Seán O'Kennedy =

Irish hurler and Gaelic footballer

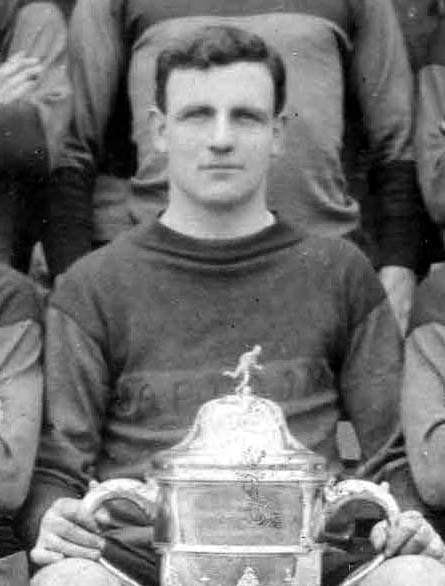

Personal information
- Native name: Seán Ó Cinnéide (Irish)
- Born: John Kennedy; 20 January 1885 New Ross, County Wexford, Ireland
- Died: 22 June 1949 (aged 64) Wexford, County Wexford, Ireland
- Occupation: Accountant

Sport
- Football Position: Half-back
- Hurling Position: Half-back
Club
- Years: Club
- New Ross Geraldines
Club titles
	Football	Hurling
Wexford titles	1	1
Inter-county
- Years: County
- 1908-1922: Wexford
Inter-county titles
	Football	Hurling
Leinster Titles	5	1
All-Ireland Titles	3	1

Seán O'Kennedy (20 January 1885 – 22 June 1949) was an Irish Gaelic footballer and hurler. His championship career with the Wexford senior teams spanned fourteen years from 1908 until 1922.

Born in New Ross, County Wexford, O'Kennedy was born to James and Mary Kennedy (née Browner). The son of a merchant clerk, he was educated locally and later worked as an accountant.

O'Kennedy first played competitive hurling and Gaelic football with the New Ross Geraldines club. He enjoyed much success at the highest level, winning a county hurling championship medal in 1913 and a county football championship medal in 1915.

By 1908, O'Kennedy was a regular member of the Wexford senior hurling team. He won an All-Ireland medal in 1910, before later becoming a key member of the Wexford senior football team. O'Kennedy won three successive All-Ireland medals as captain of the team between 1914 and 1917. He also won five successive Leinster medals as a Gaelic footballer and one Leinster medal as a hurler. O'Kennedy played his last game for Wexford in 1922.

== Honours ==
New Ross Geraldines

- Wexford Senior Football Championship (1): 1915
- Wexford Senior Hurling Championship (1): 1913

Wexford

- All-Ireland Senior Hurling Championship (1): 1910
- All-Ireland Senior Football Championship (3): 1915 (c), 1916 (c), 1917 (c)
- Leinster Senior Hurling Championship (1): 1910
- Leinster Senior Football Championship (5): 1913, 1914 (c), 1915 (c), 1916 (c), 1917 (c)

Sporting positions
Preceded by Tom Doyle	Wexford Senior Football Captain; 1914-1917	Succeeded by Tom McGrath
Preceded by	Wexford Senior Hurling Captain; 1916	Succeeded by
Achievements
Preceded by Dick Fitzgerald	All-Ireland Senior Football Final winning captain 1915-1917	Succeeded by Tom McGrath
