= List of All-Ireland Senior Football Championship final goalscorers =

The following is a list of goalscorers in All-Ireland Senior Football Championship finals. See List of FIFA World Cup final goalscorers a similar list but in soccer not Gaelic football

Scoring in Gaelic games: Most scores are points but there are goals too.

The last final to finish goalless was in 2022.

The first ever goal in a final was scored by William Spain twelve minutes from the end of the 1887 final. Billy Mackessy scored the first hat-trick in the 1911 final. Dean Rock holds the record for the fastest goal scored in the history of All-Ireland SFC finals, after sending the ball past David Clarke directly from the throw-in of the 2020 final, breaking Kerryman Garry McMahon's record which had stood since the 1962 final. Other defining goals include David Clifford's in the 2026 final, both surpassing Colm Cooper as Kerry's leading championship scorer and equalling Mikey Sheehy's all-time goalscoring record for Kerry.

== Finals goalscorers ==
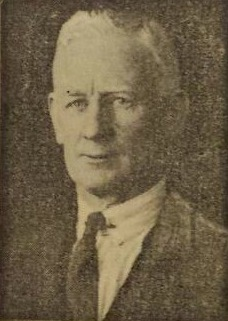
Joe Ledwidge scored two goals in the 1898 final.

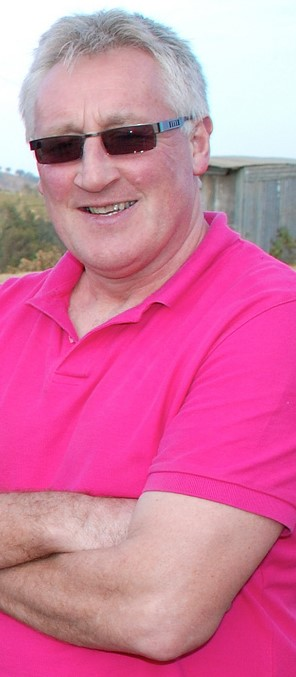
Pat Spillane

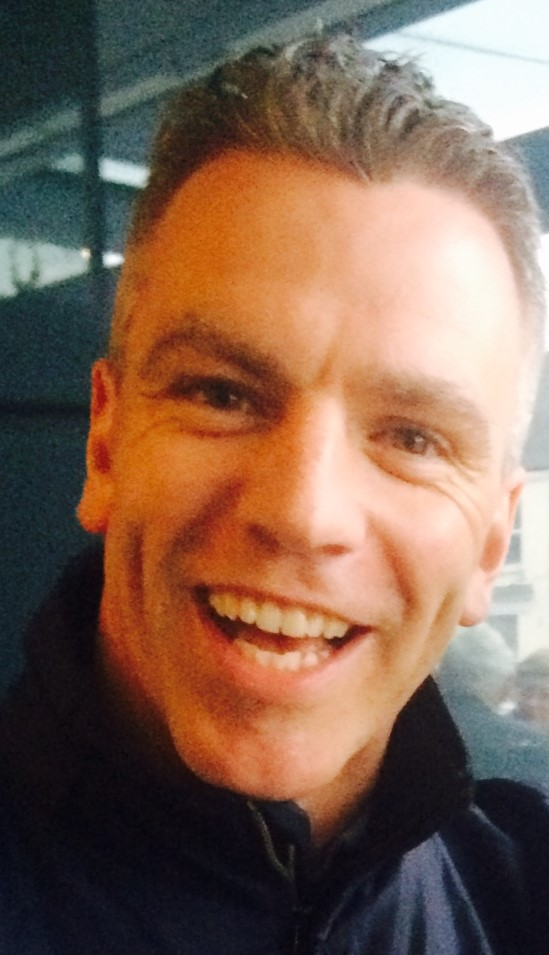
Pádraic Joyce scored a goal in the 1998 final.

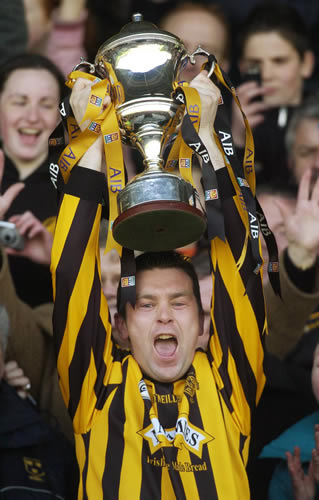
Oisín McConville scored a goal in the 2002 final.

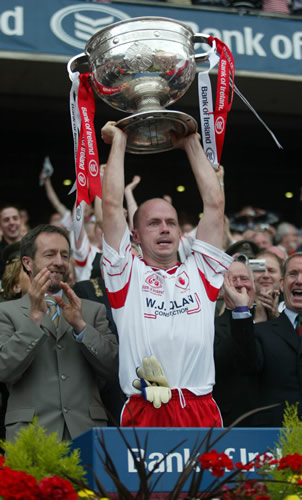
Peter Canavan scored a goal in the 2005 final.

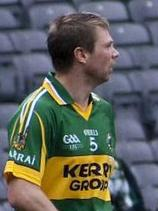
Tomás Ó Sé scored a goal in the 2005 final.

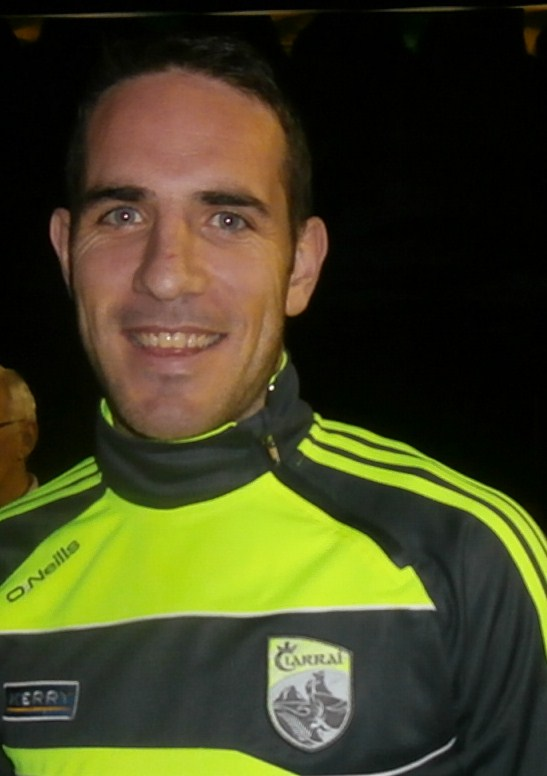
Declan O'Sullivan scored a goal in the 2006 final.

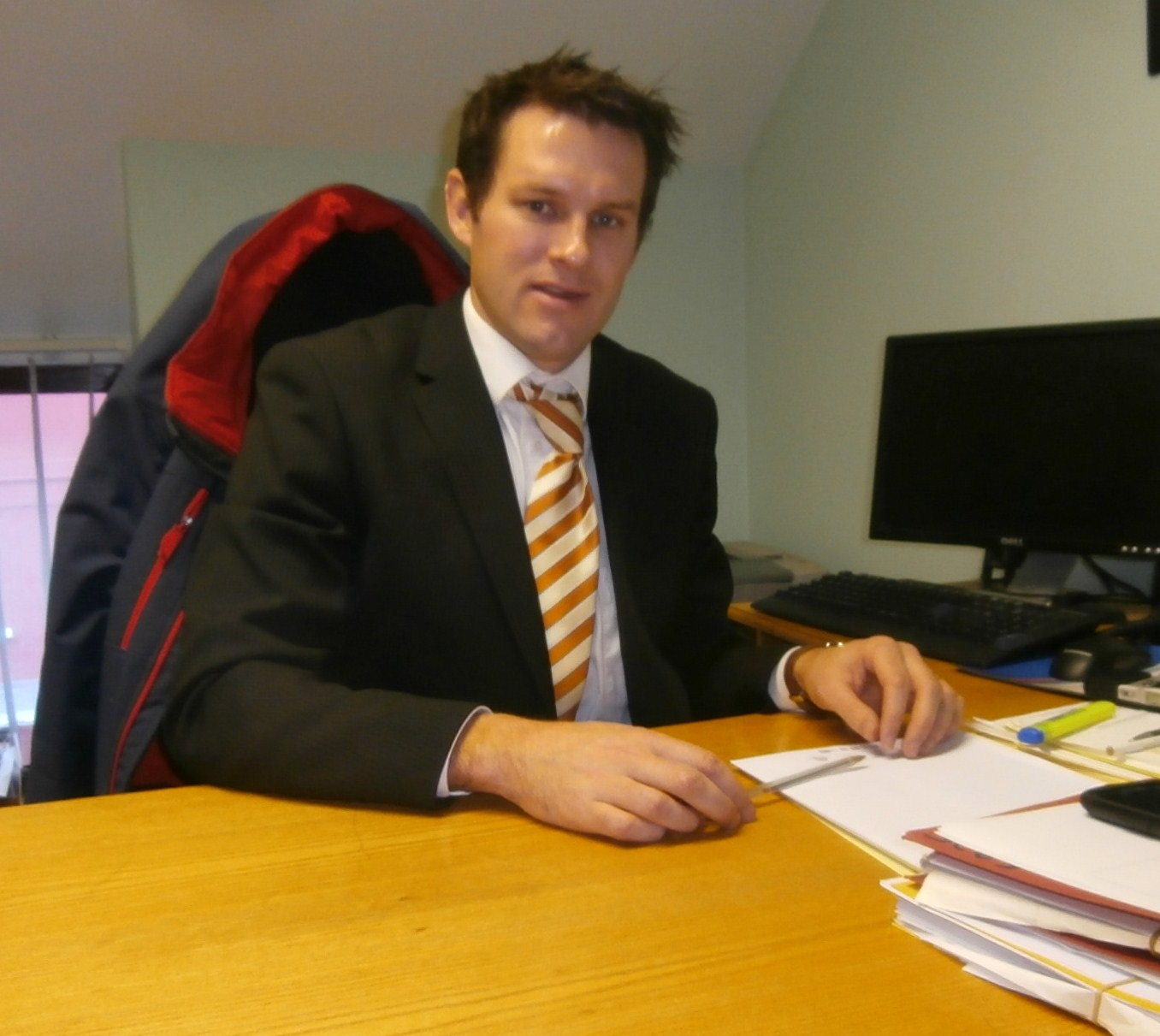
Eoin Brosnan scored a goal in the 2006 final.

=== Pre-1928 ===
| Year | Detail |
|---|---|
| 1887 | William Spain for Limerick, 12' from the end |
| 1889 | 3 goals for Tipperary |
| 1890 | 2 goals for Cork |
| 1891 | 2 goals for Dublin; 1 goal for Cork |
| 1892 | 1 goal for Dublin, with ten minutes to go |
| 1893 | 1 goal for Wexford |
| 1894 (1) | 1 goal for Dublin |
| 1894 (2) | 1 goal for Cork |
| 1896 | Bill Murphy for Limerick |
| 1897 | William Guiry X2 for Dublin |
| 1898 | Joe Ledwidge X2 for Dublin |
| 1899 | 1 goal for Dublin, in the first half |
| 1900 | 3 goals for Tipp |
| 1902 | 2 goals for Dublin, in the first half |
| 1905 | Jack Connolly for Kildare |
| 1908 | 1 goal for Dublin |
| 1909 | Johnny Skinner for Kerry |
| 1911 | 1 goal for Antrim, followed by 6 goals for Cork that included a Billy Mackessy hat-trick the first in an All Ireland Football final |
| 1912 | 1 goal apiece for Antrim and Louth |
| 1913 | Dick Fitzgerald, Johnny Skinner for Kerry |
| 1914 (1) | 2 goals for Wexford; 1 goal for Kerry |
| 1914 (2) | 2 goals for Kerry |
| 1915 | Jim and Aidan Byrne for Wexford; Dick Fitzgerald and Denis Doyle for Kerry |
| 1916 | 3 goals for Wexford; 1 goal for Mayo |
| 1919 | 2 goals for Kildare, by Frank "Joyce" Conlan and Jim O'Connor |
| 1920 | Frank Burke for Dublin; Tommy Powell for Tipp |
| 1920 | Bill Fitzsimmons for Dublin |
| 1923 | P. J. Kirwan for Dublin; 1 other goal for Kerry (Brosnan) |
| 1925 | 3 goals for Galway; 1 goal for Cavan |
| 1926 (1) | Bill Gorman for Kerry |
| 1926 (2) | Tom O'Mahoney for Kerry |

=== 1928 to 1969: Introduction of the Sam Maguire Cup ===
| Year | Detail |
|---|---|
| 1928 | 2 goals for Kildare; 2 goals for Cavan |
| 1929 | 1 goal for Kerry by Ned Sweeney, 1 for Kildare |
| 1930 | John Joe Landers, John Joe Sheehy Ned Sweeney for Kerry |
| 1931 | Paul Russell for Kerry |
| 1932 | Bill Landers and Paul Russell for Kerry |
| 1933 | Louis Blessing and "Son" Magee for Cavan (both first half); 2 other goals for Galway |
| 1934 | Michael Ferriter X2, Martin Kelly for Galway; 1 other goal for Dublin |
| 1935 | 3 goals for Cavan; 2 goals for Kildare |
| 1936 | 4 goals for Mayo including a Paddy Munnelly hat-trick |
| 1937 (1) | 3 goals for Kerry; 1 goal for Cavan |
| 1937 (2) | 4 goals for Kerry by Timmy O'Leary (2) Miko Doyle and John Joe Landers; 1 goal for Cavan |
| 1938 (1) | 3 goals for Galway; 2 goals for Kerry |
| 1938 (2) | 2 goals for Galway |
| 1939 | 2 goals for Kerry by Dan Spring; 2 goals for Meath |
| 1940 | Joe Duggan for Galway (just before half-time) |
| 1941 | Tom O'Connor for Kerry |
| 1942 | Paddy O'Connor for Dublin (10th minute); 1 other goal for Galway |
| 1943 (1) | 1 goal apiece for Cavan and Roscommon |
| 1943 (2) | 2 goals apiece for Cavan and Roscommon |
| 1944 | Frankie Kinlough for Roscommon; 2 goals for Kerry |
| 1945 | Derry Beckett and Mick Tubridy for Cork |
| 1946 (1) | 2 goals for Kerry by Paddy Burke and Tom O'Connor; 1 goal for Roscommon |
| 1946 (2) | 2 goals for Kerry also by Paddy Burke and Tom O'Connor |
| 1947 | 2 goals for Cavan; 2 goals for Kerry |
| 1948 | 3 first-half goals for Cavan, 1 second-half goal for Cavan; 4 second-half goals for Mayo |
| 1949 | 1 goal for Meath; 1 goal for Cavan (both second-half) |
| 1950 | Peter Solan(?) and Seán Flanagan(?) for Mayo; 1 goal for Louth |
| 1951 | Tom Langan and Joe Gilvarry for Mayo |
| 1952 (1) | 2 goals for Cavan; 1 goal for Meath (none in replay) |
| 1953 | Mal McEvoy for Armagh (early) |
| 1954 | Tom Moriarty for Meath; 1 goal for Kerry |
| 1955 | Ollie Freaney for Dublin |
| 1956 | Frank Stockwell X2 for Galway (both first half); Johnny Creedon and Denis Kelleher X2 for Cork (second half) |
| 1957 | Tom Furlong for Cork; possible own goal? for Louth |
| 1958 | Owen Gribben and Paddy Farnan for Dublin |
| 1959 | Dan McAuliffe X2, Garry McMahon for Kerry; 1 other goal for Galway |
| 1960 | 2 goals for Down; Dan McCartan (11 minutes into the second half), Paddy Doherty two minutes later from a (p) |
| 1961 | Mike Casey and Peter Daly for Offaly; followed by three goals for Down, all before half-time |
| 1962 | Garry MacMahon for Kerry after 35 seconds; 1 goal for Roscommon |
| 1963 | Simon Behan for Dublin |
| 1966 | Mattie McDonagh for Galway, after 21 minutes |
| 1967 | Terry Kearns for Meath, six minutes after the restart |
| 1968 | Seán O'Neill and John Murphy for Down, before eight minutes had been played; Brendan Lynch (late) for Kerry |

=== 1970 to 2000 ===
| Year | Detail |
|---|---|
| 1970 | Din Joe Crowley and Mick Gleeson for Kerry, both late in the game |
| 1971 | Murt Connor for Offaly; 2 others for Galway |
| 1972 (1) | 1 goal each for Offaly and Kerry |
| 1972 (2) | Paddy Fenning for Offaly; none for Kerry |
| 1973 | Jimmy Barry-Murphy for Cork, after 2 minutes; Tom Naughton for Galway, second half; 1 other Galway goal, second half; Jimmy Barry-Murphy for Cork, second half; Jimmy Barrett for Cork, second half |
| 1974 | Michael Rooney for Galway, first half |
| 1975 | John Egan for Kerry, Ger O'Driscoll for Kerry |
| 1976 | John McCarthy, Jimmy Keaveney, Brian Mullins (all for Dublin) |
| 1977 | Jimmy Keaveney (X2) and three other goals for Dublin; Joe Kernan (X2) and 1 other goal for Armagh |
| 1978 | John Egan for Kerry, Mikey Sheehy for Kerry, Eoin Liston X3 for Kerry |
| 1979 | 3 goals for Kerry; 1 goal for Dublin |
| 1980 | John 'Jigger' O'Connor for Roscommon, after 35 seconds; Mikey Sheehy for Kerry |
| 1981 | Jack O'Shea for Kerry |
| 1982 | Séamus Darby for Offaly, last minute |
| 1983 | Barney Rock for Dublin; Stephen Joyce for Galway |
| 1984 | Barney Rock for Dublin |
| 1985 | Jack O'Shea for Kerry (after 11 minutes); Joe McNally X2 for Dublin (second half), Timmy O'Dowd for Kerry (afterwards) |
| 1986 | Pat Spillane, Mikey Sheehy |
| 1987 | Colm O'Rourke |
| 1988 (1) | 1 goal for Cork (none in replay) |
| 1989 | Anthony Finnerty for Mayo (in the 38th minute) |
| 1991 | 1 goal for Down, 1 goal for Meath |
| 1993 | Séamus Downey for Derry; 2 goals for Cork |
| 1994 | James McCarten for Down |
| 1995 | Charlie Redmond (late in the first half) |
| 1996 (1) | 1 for Mayo |
| 1996 (2) | Trevor Giles (p) for Meath and Tommy Dowd for Meath; 1 for Mayo |
| 1997 | 1 for Mayo |
| 1998 | Dermot Earley Jnr for Kildare (first half), Pádraic Joyce for Galway (second half, before 50th minute) |
| 1999 | Joe Kavanagh for Cork (start of second half); 1 other for Meath |
| 2000 (2) | Declan Meehan for Galway in the 6th minute |

=== 2001 to present ===
| Year | Detail |
|---|---|
| 2002 | Oisín McConville for Armagh (54') |
| 2004 | 1 for Kerry (first half); 1 for Mayo (first half); 1 for Mayo (second half) |
| 2005 | Peter Canavan for Tyrone; Dara Ó Cinnéide for Kerry; Tomás Ó Sé for Kerry |
| 2006 | Declan O'Sullivan for Kerry (7'); Kieran Donaghy for Kerry (9'); Kevin O'Neill for Mayo (16'); Colm Cooper for Kerry (26'); Pat Harte for Mayo (34'); Kevin O'Neill for Mayo (soon after; before half-time); Eoin Brosnan for Kerry (second half injury time) |
| 2007 | Colm Cooper for Kerry; Kieran Donaghy X2 for Kerry; Daniel Goulding for Cork |
| 2008 | Tommy McGuigan for Tyrone |
| 2009 | Colm O'Neill for Cork |

| Year | Player | Team | Score | Minute | Result | Report | Ref |
|---|---|---|---|---|---|---|---|
| 2009 | Colm O'Neill | Cork | | 10' | 1–9 (12) – 0–16 (16) | | |
| 2011 | Colm Cooper | Kerry | | | 1–12 (15) – 1–11 (14) | | |
| 2011 | Kevin McManamon | Dublin | | | 1–12 (15) – 1–11 (14) | | |
| 2012 | Michael Murphy | Donegal | 1–0 (3) - 0-0 (0) | 3' | 2–11 (17) – 0–13 (13) | | |
| 2012 | Colm McFadden | Donegal | 2–1 (7) - 0-0 (0) | 11' | 2–11 (17) – 0–13 (13) | | |
| 2013 | Bernard Brogan | Dublin | | | 2–12 (18) – 1–14 (17) | | |
| 2013 | Bernard Brogan (2) | Dublin | | | 2–12 (18) – 1–14 (17) | | |
| 2013 | Andy Moran | Mayo | | | 2–12 (18) – 1–14 (17) | | |
| 2014 | Paul Geaney | Kerry | 1–0 (3) - 0-0 (0) | 1' | 2–9 (15) – 0–12 (12) | | |
| 2014 | Kieran Donaghy | Kerry | | | 2–9 (15) – 0–12 (12) | | |
| 2016 (1) | Kevin McLoughlin | Dublin | 1–0 (3) - 0-2 (2) | 9' (o.g.) | 2–9 (15) – 0–15 (15) | | |
| 2016 (1) | Colm Boyle | Dublin | 2–0 (6) - 0-4 (14) | 23' (o.g.) | 2–9 (15) – 0–15 (15) | | |
| 2016 (2) | Lee Keegan | Mayo | 1–4 (7) - 0-6 (6) | 18' | 1–15 (18) – 1–14 (17) | Report | |
| 2016 (2) | Diarmuid Connolly | Dublin | | 42' (p) | 1–15 (18) – 1–14 (17) | Report | |
| 2017 | Con O'Callaghan | Dublin | 1–0 (3) - 0-0 (0) | 3' | 1–17 (20) – 1–16 (19) | | |
| 2017 | Lee Keegan | Mayo | 1–12 (15) - 1-11 (14) | 53' | 1–17 (20) – 1–16 (19) | | |
| 2018 | Paul Mannion | Dublin | 1–3 (6) - 0-5 (5) | 20' (p) | 2–17 (23) – 1–14 (17) | | |
| 2018 | Niall Scully | Dublin | 2–5 (11) - 0-7 (7) | 27' | 2–17 (23) – 1–14 (17) | | |
| 2018 | Peter Harte | Tyrone | 2–14 (20) - 1-12 (15) | 65' (p) | 2–17 (23) – 1–14 (17) | | |
| 2019 (1) | Jack McCaffrey | Dublin | 1–4 (7) - 0-5 (5) | 19' | 1–16 (19) – 1–16 (19) | Report | |
| 2019 (1) | Killian Spillane | Kerry | 1–14 (17) - 1-12 (15) | 56' | 1–16 (19) – 1–16 (19) | Report | |
| 2019 (2) | Eoin Murchan | Dublin | 1–10 (13) - 0-10 (10) | 36' | 1–18 (21) – 0–15 (15) | Report | |
| 2020 | Dean Rock | Dublin | 1–0 (3) - 0-0 (0) | 1' | 2–14 (20) – 0–15 (15) | | |
| 2020 | Con O'Callaghan | Dublin | | 23' | 2–14 (20) – 0–15 (15) | | |
| 2021 | Cathal McShane | Tyrone | 1–10 (13) - 0-9 (9) | 46' | 2–14 (20) – 0–15 (15) | | |
| 2021 | Darren McCurry | Tyrone | 2–10 (16) - 0-11 (11) | between 58' and 61' | 2–14 (20) – 0–15 (15) | | |
| 2023 | Paul Geaney | Kerry | 1–4 (7) - 0–6 (6) | 35+2' | 1–15 (18) – 1–13 (16) | Report | |
| 2023 | Paddy Small | Dublin | 1–8 (11) - 1–8 (11) | 46' | 1–15 (18) – 1–13 (16) | Report | |
| 2024 | Aaron McKay | Armagh | | 47' | 1–11 (14) – 0–13 (13) | Report | |
| 2025 | Joe O'Connor | Kerry | 1–26 (29) – 0–19 (19) | 70' | 1–26 (29) – 0–19 (19) | Report | |
| 2026 | David Clifford | Kerry | 1–4 (7) - 0-1 (1) | 15' | 1–20 (23) – 1–17 (20) | Report | |
| 2026 | D. Beirne | Mayo | 1–12 (15) - 1-8 (11) | 40' | 1–20 (23) – 1–17 (20) | Report | |

== Statistics ==
=== Men with multiple goals ===
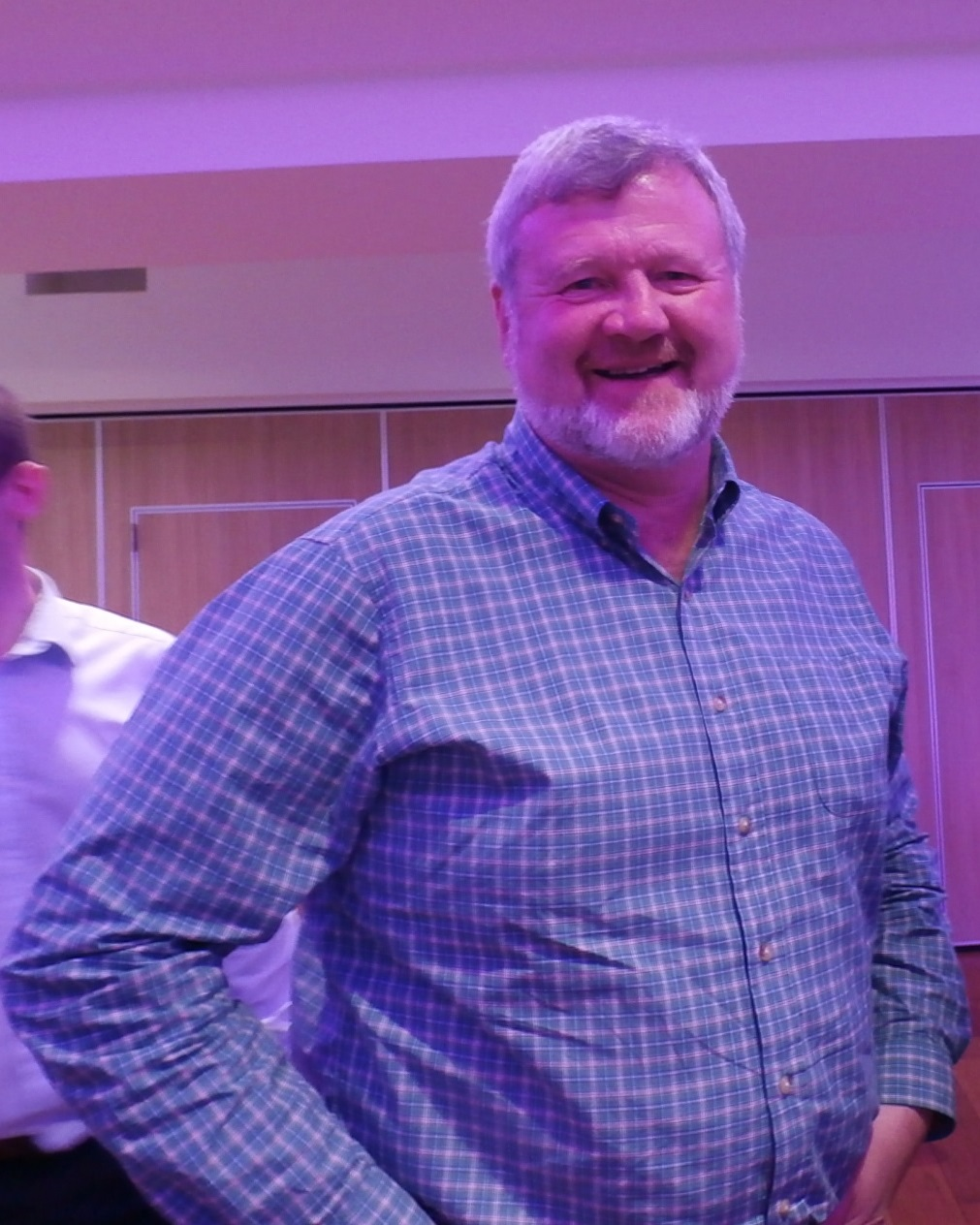
Eoin Liston once scored three goals in an All-Ireland final.

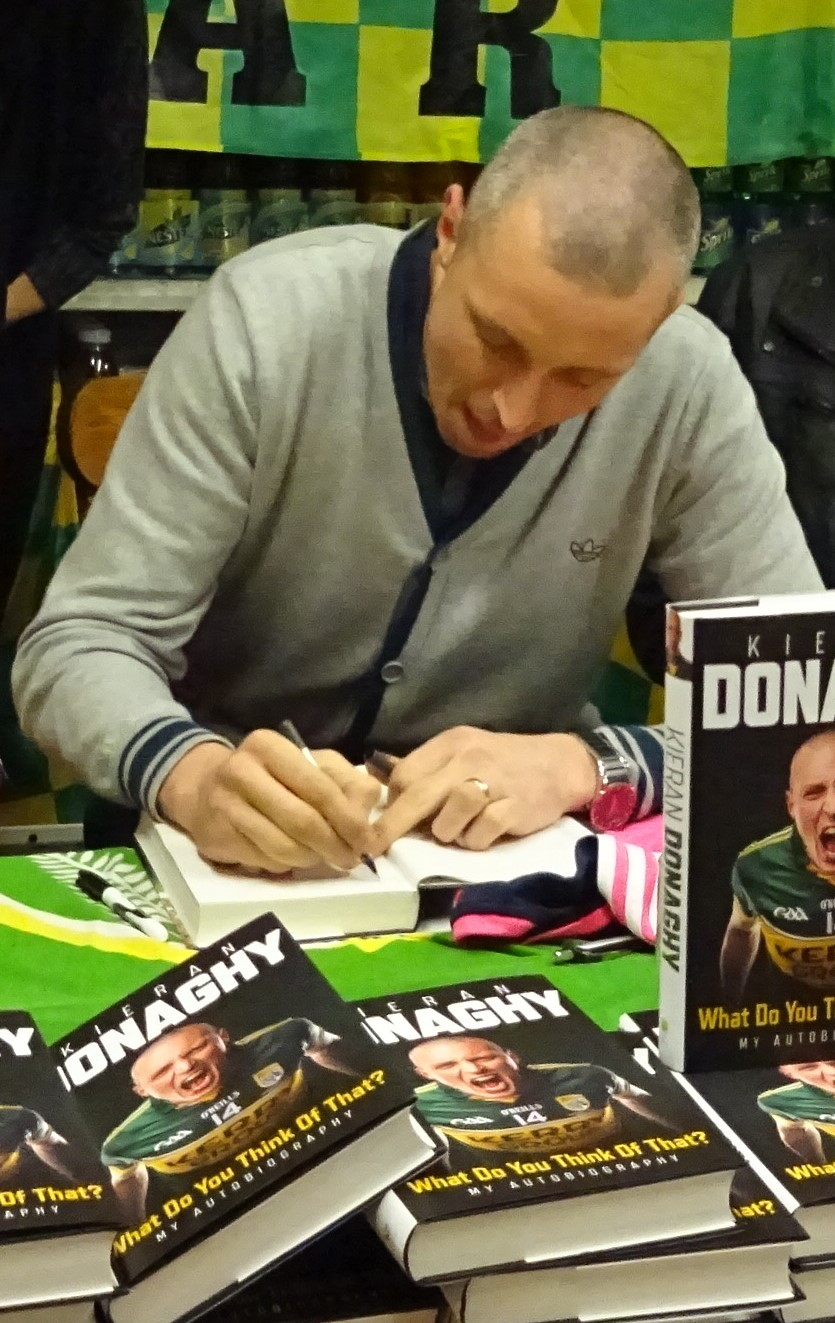
Kieran Donaghy scored four goals across three different finals.

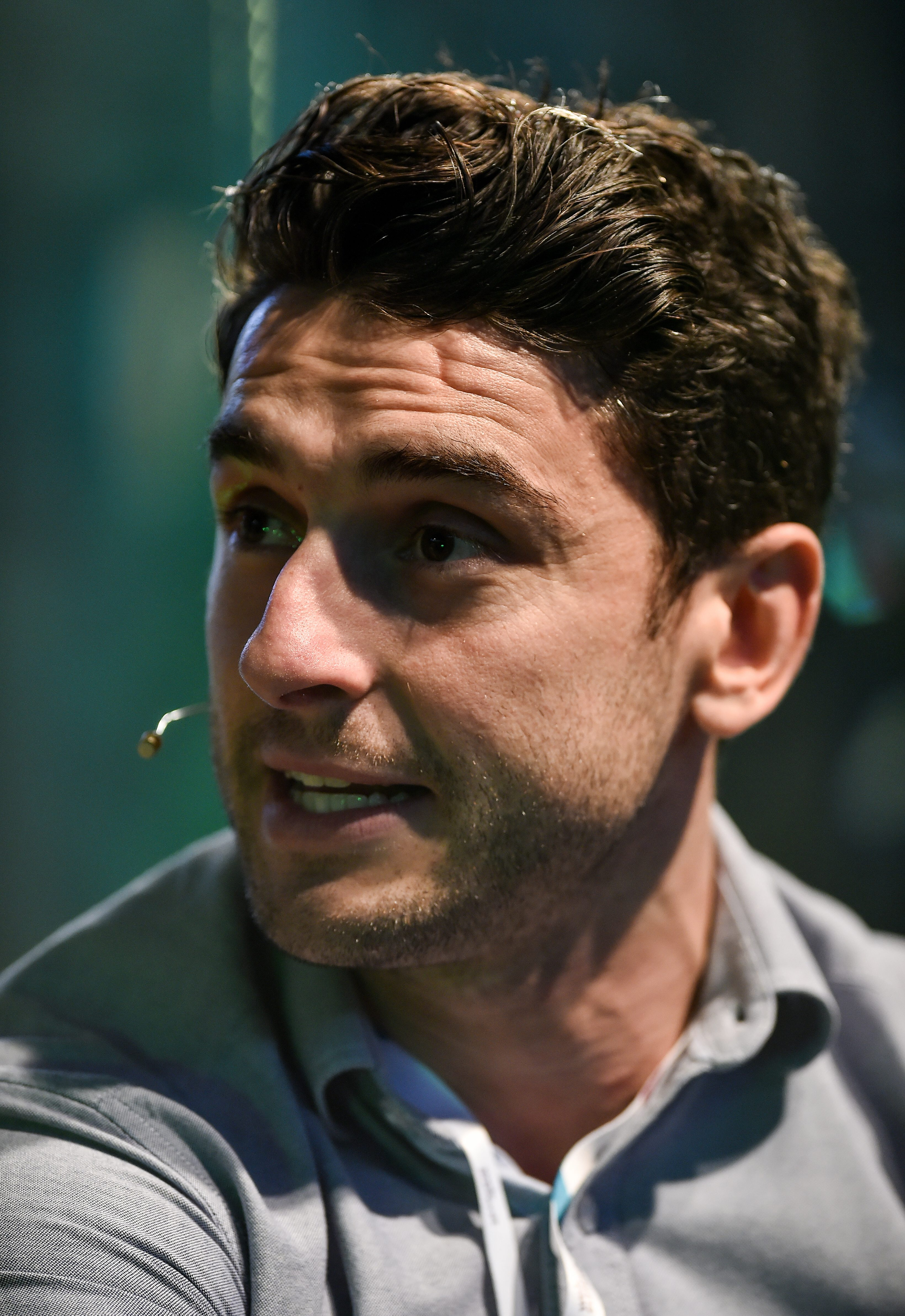
Bernard Brogan scored two goals in the 2013 final.

They include (list probably not complete):

| Player | Number of goals | Team | Year(s) |
|---|---|---|---|
| Kieran Donaghy | 4 | Kerry | 2006, 2007 (X2), 2014 |
| Billy Mackessy | 3 | Cork | 1911 |
| Paddy Munnelly | 3 | Mayo | 1936 |
| Tom O'Connor | 3 | Kerry | 1941, 1946 drawn game, 1946 replay |
| Jimmy Keaveney | 3 | Dublin | 1976, 1977 (X2) |
| Eoin Liston | 3 | Kerry | 1978 |
| Mikey Sheehy | 3 | Kerry | 1978, 1980, 1986 |
| William Guiry | 2 | Dublin | 1897 |
| Joe Ledwidge | 2 | Dublin | 1898 |
| Johnny Skinner | 2 | Kerry | 1909, 1913 |
| Dick Fitzgerald | 2 | Kerry | 1913, 1915 |
| Ned Sweeney | 2 | Kerry | 1929, 1930 |
| Paul Russell | 2 | Kerry | 1931, 1932 |
| Michael Ferriter | 2 | Galway | 1933 |
| John Joe Landers | 2 | Kerry | 1930, 1937 replay |
| Timmy O'Leary | 2 | Kerry | 1937 replay |
| Dan Spring | 2 | Kerry | 1939 |
| Paddy Burke | 2 | Kerry | 1946 drawn game, 1946 replay |
| Frank Stockwell | 2 | Galway | 1956 |
| Denis Kelleher | 2 | Cork | 1956 |
| Dan McAuliffe | 2 | Kerry | 1959 |
| Jimmy Barry-Murphy | 2 | Cork | 1973 |
| John Egan | 2 | Kerry | 1975, 1978 |
| Joe Kernan | 2 | Armagh | 1977 |
| Barney Rock | 2 | Dublin | 1983, 1984 |
| Joe McNally | 2 | Dublin | 1985 |
| Kevin O'Neill | 2 | Mayo | 2006 |
| Colm Cooper | 2 | Kerry | 1978, 2007 |
| Bernard Brogan Jnr | 2 | Dublin | 2013 |
| Con O'Callaghan | 2 | Dublin | 2017, 2020 |
| Paul Geaney | 2 | Kerry | 2014, 2022 |

=== Men who scored penalties ===
A comprehensive list of all penalties taken in All-Ireland finals was published in the Irish Independent in 2024.

=== Goalless finals ===
Complete list of goalless finals.

1895

1901

1903

1904

1906

1907

1910 (was not played)

1917

1918

1922

1924

1927

1952 replay

1964

1965

1969

1988 replay

1990

1992

2000 drawn game

2001

2003

2010

2015

2022
