= 1932 All-Ireland Senior Football Championship final =

1932 All-Ireland Senior Championship Football final
- Event: 1932 All-Ireland Senior Football Championship
Kerry	Mayo
2–7 (13)	2–4 (10)
- Date: 25 September 1932
- Venue: Croke Park, Dublin
- Referee: Martin O'Neill (Wexford)
- Attendance: 25,816
- Weather: Heavy rain

The 1932 All-Ireland Senior Football Championship final was the 45th All-Ireland Final and the deciding match of the 1932 All-Ireland Senior Football Championship, an inter-county Gaelic football tournament for the top teams in Ireland.

== Match ==
=== Summary ===
Mayo led 1–4 to 1–1 at half-time, but, as in 1931, Kerry were much stronger in the second half. Goals by Bill Landers and Paul Russell helped Kerry to a fourth consecutive All-Ireland SFC title. Kerry's Eamonn Fitzgerald missed the game as he was competing in the 1932 Summer Olympics.

It was the third of five All-Ireland SFC titles won by Kerry in the 1930s.

=== Details ===
25 September 1932
Final

Kerry	2–7 – 2–4	Mayo

Croke Park, Dublin
Referee: Martin O'Neill (Wexford)
Attendance: 25,816

Kerry	Mayo

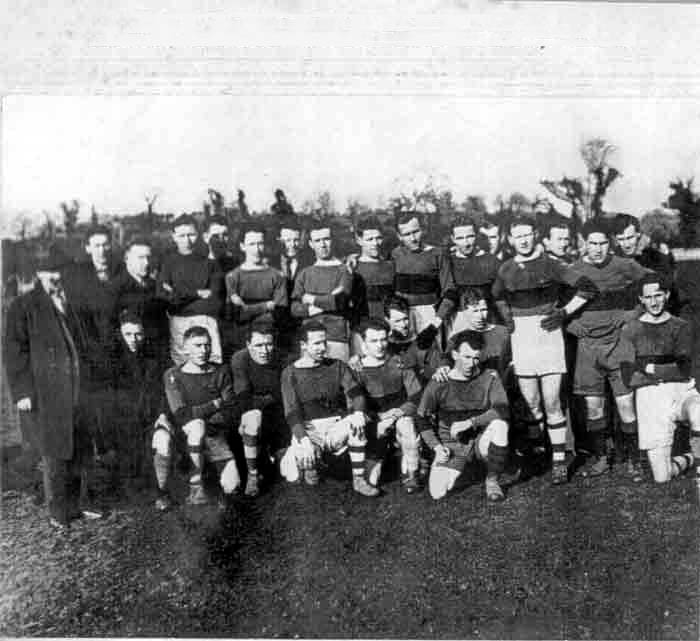
Team of Mayo, runners-up

==== Kerry ====
- 1 Dan O'Keeffe
- 2 Dee O'Connor
- 3 Joe Barrett (c)
- 4 Jack Walsh
- 5 Paul Russell
- 6 Joe O'Sullivan
- 7 Paddy Whitty
- 8 Bob Stack
- 9 J. Walsh
- 10 Con Geaney
- 11 Miko Doyle
- 12 Tim Landers
- 13 Jackie Ryan
- 14 Con Brosnan
- 15 J. J. Landers

Sub used
Bill Landers for Geaney
