= 1931 All-Ireland Senior Football Championship final =

- Event: 1931 All-Ireland Senior Football Championship
Kerry	Kildare
1–11 (14)	0–8 (8)
- Date: 27 September 1931
- Venue: Croke Park, Dublin
- Referee: T. Keating (Tipperary)
- Attendance: 42,350
- Weather: Fine

The 1931 All-Ireland Senior Football Championship final was the 44th All-Ireland Final and the deciding match of the 1931 All-Ireland Senior Football Championship, an inter-county Gaelic football tournament for the top teams in Ireland.

== Match ==
=== Summary ===
Kildare led 0–7 to 0–4 at half-time, but Kerry outclassed them in the second half, a defensive mixup allowing a Paul Russell long shot drop into the goals.

It was the second of five All-Ireland SFC titles won by Kerry in the 1930s.

=== Details ===
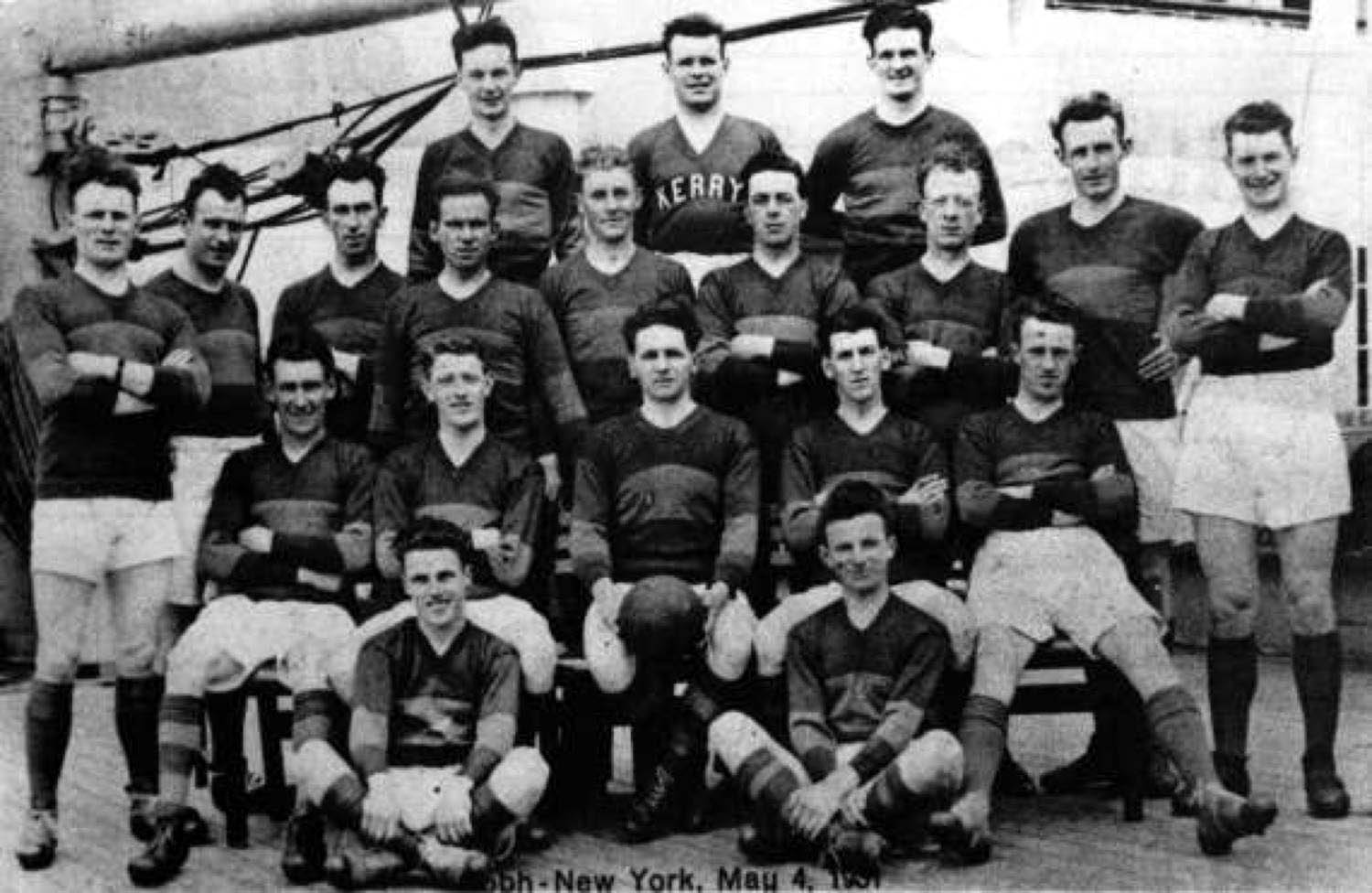
Team of Kerry, champions

27 September 1931
Final

Kerry	1–11 – 0–8	Kildare

Croke Park, Dublin
Referee: T. Keating (Tipperary)
Attendance: 42,350

Kerry
Kildare

==== Kerry ====
- 1 Dan O'Keeffe
- 2 Dee O'Connor
- 3 Joe Barrett
- 4 Jack Walsh
- 5 Paul Russell
- 6 Joe O'Sullivan
- 7 Tim Landers
- 8 Con Brosnan (c)
- 9 Bob Stack
- 10 J. J. Landers
- 11 Miko Doyle
- 12 Éamonn Fitzgerald
- 13 Jackie Ryan
- 14 Paddy Whitty
- 15 Martin Regan
