= 1929 All-Ireland Senior Football Championship final =

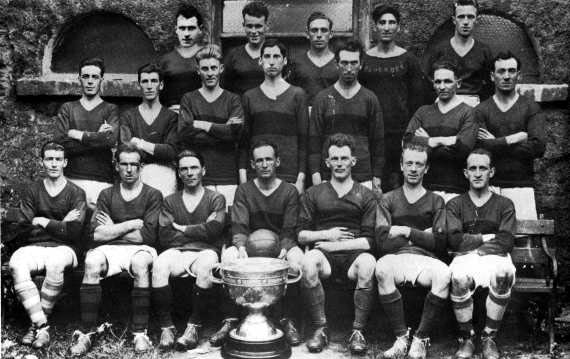
- Kerry, champions
- Event: 1929 All-Ireland Senior Football Championship
Kerry	Kildare
1–8 (11)	1–5 (8)
- Date: 22 September 1929
- Venue: Croke Park, Dublin
- Attendance: 43,839

The 1929 All-Ireland Senior Football Championship final was the 42nd All-Ireland Final and the deciding match of the 1929 All-Ireland Senior Football Championship, an inter-county Gaelic football tournament for the top teams in Ireland.

== Background ==
This was the fourth of four consecutive appearances in the decider for Kildare.

== Match ==
This year's final was played on 22 September.

=== Summary ===
Kerry won the final by three points, with a goal by Ned Sweeney.

It was the third of three All-Ireland SFC titles won by Kerry in the 1920s, which made them joint "team of the decade" with Dublin, also winner of three.

=== Details ===
22 September 1929
Final

Kerry	1–8 – 1–5	Kildare
J J Sheehy 0–6, N Sweeney 1–0, J Ryan, J J Landers 0–1 each		P.Doyle 0–5, P.Martin 1–0.

Croke Park, Dublin
Attendance: 43,839
Referee: Tom Burke (Louth)

==== Kerry ====
- 1 Johnny Riordan
- 2 Dee O'Connor
- 3 Joe Barrett (c)
- 4 Jack Walsh
- 5 Paul Russell
- 6 Joe O'Sullivan
- 7 Tim O'Donnell
- 8 Con Brosnan
- 9 Bob Stack
- 10 Jackie Ryan
- 11 Miko Doyle
- 12 J. J. Landers
- 13 Ned Sweeney
- 14 Jimmy Bailey
- 15 J. J. Sheehy
