= 1930 All-Ireland Senior Football Championship final =

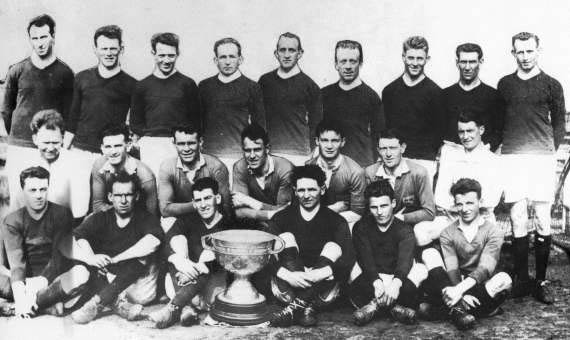
- Kerry, champions
- Event: 1930 All-Ireland Senior Football Championship
Kerry	Monaghan
3–11 (20)	0–2 (2)
- Date: 28 September 1930
- Venue: Croke Park, Dublin
- Referee: Jim Byrne (Wexford)
- Attendance: 33,280

The 1930 All-Ireland Senior Football Championship final was the 43rd All-Ireland Final and the deciding match of the 1930 All-Ireland Senior Football Championship, an inter-county Gaelic football tournament for the top teams in Ireland.

== Match ==
=== Summary ===
Monaghan scored first, but Kerry won comprehensively with goals by John Joe Landers, John Joe Sheehy (who was captain of the team) and Ned Sweeney.

It was the first of five All-Ireland SFC titles won by Kerry in the 1930s.

This was also the first championship meeting of Kerry and Monaghan. It remains Monaghan's only final appearance.

Monaghan's goalkeeper for this game, Thomas Bradley, was a First World War veteran, who had been at the Battle of the Somme and Battle of Passchendaele.

=== Details ===
28 September 1930
Final

Kerry	3–11 – 0–2	Monaghan
J J Landers 2–3, N Sweeney 1–0, J J Sheehy, J Ryan 0–3 each, M Doyle 0–2

Croke Park, Dublin
Attendance: 33,280
Referee: Jim Byrne (Wexford)

==== Kerry ====
- 1 Johnny Riordan
- 2 Dee O'Connor
- 3 Joe Barrett
- 4 Jack Walsh
- 5 Paul Russell
- 6 Joe O'Sullivan
- 7 Tim O'Donnell
- 8 Con Brosnan
- 9 Bob Stack
- 10 Jackie Ryan
- 11 Miko Doyle
- 12 Éamonn Fitzgerald
- 13 Ned Sweeney
- 14 J. J. Landers
- 15 J. J. Sheehy (c)

==== Monaghan ====
- Thomas Bradley
- ?
