= Galway–Mayo Gaelic football rivalry =

Sports rivalry in Ireland

Galway-Mayo
- Other names: Connacht Derby
- Location: County Galway; County Mayo
- Teams: Galway; Mayo
- First meeting: Mayo 2-4 – 0-3 Galway; 1901 Connacht final (9 November 1902)
- Latest meeting: Mayo 3–18 – Galway 2–18; 2026 National Football League (25 January 2026)

Statistics
- Total meetings: 93
- Most wins: Galway (44)
- All-time series: Galway 44 wins, Mayo 42 wins, 6 Draws
- Largest victory: 17 points Galway 5-13 – 2-5 Mayo; 1956 Connacht Quarter-Final; Mayo 4-16 – 0-11 Galway; 2013 Connacht Quarter-Final

The Galway–Mayo rivalry is a Gaelic football rivalry between Irish county teams Galway and Mayo, who first played each other in 1901. It is considered to be one of the biggest rivalries in Gaelic games. Mayo's home ground is MacHale Park in Castlebar, while Galway play their home games in Salthill's Pearse Stadium or St Jarlath's Park in Tuam.

The Tribesmen have enjoyed greater success in the All-Ireland, having won nine titles to Mayo's four. However Mayo has experience more recent success having won the Sam Maguire in 2026 while Galway has not won it since 2001. The rivalry has historically been good-natured but has taken on a harder edge since the turn of the millennium, with the mood between supporters souring.

== History ==
The rivalry between the teams has been added to by Mayo students attending the St Jarlath's College boarding school in Tuam.

One of the oldest rivalries in Gaelic football, the fixture was first contested in the 1901 Championship with Mayo winning by 2-4 to 0-3 on the day. The game, which took place in Claremorris on 9 November 1902, was the first official final of the Connacht Championship. The Connacht GAA Council was founded on the same day.

Mayo were the first of the two to contest an All-Ireland final, when they faced Wexford in the 1916 final. Galway became the first to win the tournament in the 1925 Championship (though the Championship itself was not completed until 1926). The 1930s was the greatest era of dominance for the two teams; between 1932 and 1942 Galway and Mayo contested eight All-Ireland senior finals, with Galway winning titles in 1934 and 1938, and Mayo winning their maiden title in 1936. The teams were also two of the strongest teams in the country in the 1950s and 1960s, with Mayo winning in 1950 and 1951, and Galway winning in 1956, 1964, 1965 and 1966. In that era, each team regularly gave the other their toughest game of the year. Following Galway's 1966 triumph however, no Connacht team would win an All-Ireland for another 32 years.

The rivalry has historically been characterised as relatively friendly, with many Galway and Mayo players from the 1950s–60s teams having attended the same schools and players from the border areas having family ties in the other county. This is in contrast to the more bitter rivalries in the sport like Cork–Kerry or Armagh–Tyrone. The good-natured rivalry has also been attributed to the similarities between the two counties and the shared socio-economic challenges they have faced through the years. With a total of nearly 40,000 people emigrating from the two counties from 1951 to 1966, their shared success in football was considered one of the few bright spots in that era.

The friendliness of the contest has been tested in recent years however. Following defeats for Mayo in the 1996 and 1997 All-Ireland finals, Galway knocked Mayo out in the opening round of the 1998 Championship and went on to win the title. Galway, who were managed by Mayo-man John O'Mahony, also won the title in 2001. Galway's win, on the back of Mayo's two defeats and under the stewardship of a Mayo native, left a sour taste. When the team knocked Galway out of the 1999 Championship, the win was celebrated "as if it was an All-Ireland."

Mayo dominated the Connacht Championship in the early 2010s, winning five-in-a-row and inflicting a record defeat on Galway in Pearse Stadium in 2013. During this period of dominance, Mayo reached the All-Ireland finals of 2012 and 2013 but were beaten on both occasions. Their winning streak in Connacht was broken by Galway in 2016 and the Tribesmen won again when they faced each other in 2017. However, in both seasons Mayo went on to reach the All-Ireland final, while Galway were eliminated in the quarter-finals. The tension between the two teams was heightened by this level of competition, and this was reflected in the stands. Galway's All-Ireland-winning captain Ray Silke described the mood between the supporters as having "gone a little bit dark over the last while."

== Senior results ==
Galway win
Mayo win
Match was a draw

== Championship ==
Galway vs Mayo
Date	Venue	Score	Competition
9 November 1902	Claremorris	2-4 – 0-3	Connacht Final
26 March 1905	Claremorris	0-7 – 0-4	Connacht Semi-Final
7 April 1907	Claremorris	2-16 – 0-1	Connacht Final
12 July 1908	Tuam	3-6 – 0-1	Connacht Semi-Final
30 October 1910	Ballina	1-4 – 0-5	Connacht Final
24 September 1911	Claremorris	W – L	Connacht Final
21 July 1912	Roscommon	4-4 – 0-3	Connacht Semi-Final
28 September 1913	Castlerea	1-2 – 0-3	Connacht Final
3 September 1916	Athlone	2-6 – 2-2	Connacht Semi-Final
7 October 1917	Castlerea	1-4 – 1-1	Connacht Final
22 September 1918	Castlerea	0-4 – 0-1	Connacht Final
5 July 1919	Tuam	1-3 – 1-2	Connacht Semi-Final
18 July 1920	Castlerea	2-4 – 0-3	Connacht Semi-Final
18 June 1922	Tuam	0-6 – 0-1	Connacht Semi-Final
4 May 1924	Tuam	0-3 – 0-2	Connacht Final
19 October 1924	Balla	0-1 – 0-1	Connacht Final
9 November 1924	Tuam	2-6 – 0-5	Connacht Final Replay
18 October 1925	Tuam	1-5 – 1-3	Connacht Final
11 July 1926	Roscommon	3-2 – 1-2	Connacht Final
17 July 1927	Tuam	1-5 – 1-4	Connacht Semi-Final
21 July 1929	Roscommon	1-6 – 0-4	Connacht Final
29 June 1930	Boyle	0-7 – 0-1*	Connacht Semi-Final
5 June 1931	Castlerea	3-5 – 1-4	Connacht Semi-Final
17 July 1932	Castlerea	3-5 – 1-3	Connacht Semi-Final
23 July 1933	Castlerea	1-7 – 1-5	Connacht Final
22 July 1934	Castlerea	2-4 – 0-5	Connacht Final
21 July 1935	Roscommon	0-12 – 0-5	Connacht Final
19 July 1936	Roscommon	2-4 – 1-7	Connacht Final
2 August 1936	Roscommon	2-7 – 1-4	Connacht Final Replay
18 July 1937	Roscommon	3-5 – 0-8	Connacht Final
17 July 1938	Roscommon	0-8 – 0-5	Connacht Final
16 July 1939	Roscommon	2-6 – 0-3	Connacht Final
21 July 1940	Roscommon	1-7 – 0-5	Connacht Final
29 June 1941	Tuam	0-10 – 1-5	Connacht Semi-Final
20 June 1943	Kiltimagh	3-6 – 1-5	Connacht Semi-Final
18 June 1944	MacHale Park, Castlebar	1-11 – 1-3	Connacht Semi-Final
22 July 1945	Roscommon	2-6 – 1-7	Connacht Final
18 July 1948	Roscommon	2-4 – 1-7	Connacht Final
25 July 1948	Roscommon	2-10 – 2-7	Connacht Final
15 July 1951	St Jarlath's Park, Tuam	4-13 – 2-3	Connacht Final
4 July 1954	St Jarlath's Park, Tuam	2-4 – 1-5	Connacht Semi-Final
17 June 1956	MacHale Park, Castlebar	5-13 – 2-5	Connacht Quarter-Final
29 June 1958	St Jarlath’s Park, Tuam	2-9 – 0-6	Connacht Semi-Final
12 June 1960	MacHale Park, Castlebar	2-5 – 1-6	Connacht Quarter-Final
11 June 1961	St Jarlath’s Park, Tuam	0-10 – 0-6	Connacht Quarter-Final
16 June 1963	MacHale Park, Castlebar	2-8 – 1-6	Connacht Semi-Final
19 July 1964	St Jarlath’s Park, Tuam	2-12 – 1-5	Connacht Final
17 July 1966	MacHale Park, Castlebar	0-12 – 1-8	Connacht Final
25 June 1967	Pearse Stadium, Salthill	3-13 – 1-8	Connacht Semi-Final
21 July 1968	MacHale Park, Castlebar	2-10 – 2-9	Connacht Final
13 July 1969	Pearse Stadium, Salthill	0-11 – 1-8	Connacht Final
3 August 1969	MacHale Park, Castlebar	1-11 – 1-8	Connacht Final Replay
27 June 1971	St Jarlath's Park, Tuam	1-7 – 0-7	Connacht Semi-Final
8 July 1973	MacHale Park, Castlebar	1-17 – 2-12	Connacht Final
16 June 1974	St Jarlath's Park, Tuam	3-11 – 0-13	Connacht Semi-Final
21 June 1981	MacHale Park, Castlebar	2-8 – 1-9	Connacht Semi-Final
11 July 1982	St Jarlath's Park, Tuam	3-17 – 0-10	Connacht Final
17 July 1983	MacHale Park, Castlebar	1-13 – 1-9	Connacht Final
8 July 1984	Pearse Stadium, Salthill	2-13 – 2-9	Connacht Final
12 July 1987	MacHale Park, Castlebar	0-8 – 0-7	Connacht Final
25 June 1989	St Jarlath's Park, Tuam	1-8 – 1-8	Connacht Semi-Final
9 July 1989	MacHale Park, Castlebar	2-13 – 1-8	Connacht Semi-Final Replay
1 July 1990	St Jarlath's Park, Tuam	2-11 – 1-12	Connacht Semi-Final
23 June 1991	MacHale Park, Castlebar	3-11 – 0-6	Connacht Semi-Final
14 June 1992	St Jarlath's Park, Tuam	1-11 – 1-11	Connacht Quarter-Final
21 June 1992	MacHale Park, Castlebar	0-15 – 1-6	Connacht Quarter-Final Replay
23 July 1995	St Jarlath's Park, Tuam	0-17 – 1-7	Connacht Final
21 July 1996	MacHale Park, Castlebar	1-11 – 3-9	Connacht Final
25 May 1997	St Jarlath's Park, Tuam	1-16 – 0-15	Connacht Quarter-Final
24 May 1998	MacHale Park, Castlebar	1-13 – 2-6	Connacht Quarter-Final
18 July 1999	St Jarlath's Park, Tuam	1-14 – 1-10	Connacht Final
2 June 2002	MacHale Park, Castlebar	0-12 – 1-7	Connacht Semi-Final
6 July 2003	Pearse Stadium, Salthill	1-14 – 0-13	Connacht Final
27 June 2004	MacHale Park, Castlebar	0-18 – 1-9	Connacht Semi-Final
10 July 2005	Pearse Stadium, Salthill	0-10 – 0-8	Connacht Final
16 July 2006	MacHale Park, Castlebar	0-12 – 1-8	Connacht Final
20 May 2007	Pearse Stadium, Salthill	2-10 – 0-9	Connacht Quarter-Final
13 July 2008	MacHale Park, Castlebar	2-12 – 1-14	Connacht Final
19 July 2009	Pearse Stadium, Salthill	2-12 – 1-14	Connacht Final
26 June 2011	MacHale Park, Castlebar	1-12 – 1-6	Connacht Semi-Final
19 May 2013	Pearse Stadium, Salthill	4-16 – 0-11	Connacht Quarter-Final
13 July 2014	MacHale Park, Castlebar	3-14 – 0-16	Connacht Final
14 June 2015	Pearse Stadium, Salthill	1-15 – 2-8	Connacht Semi-Final
18 June 2016	MacHale Park, Castlebar	1-12 – 0-12	Connacht Semi-Final
11 June 2017	Pearse Stadium, Salthill	0-15 – 1-11	Connacht Semi-Final
13 May 2018	MacHale Park, Castlebar	1-12 – 0-12	Connacht Quarter-Final
6 July 2019	Gaelic Grounds, Limerick	2-13 – 1-13	Round 4 Qualifier
15 November 2020	Pearse Stadium, Galway	0-14 – 0-13	Connacht Final
25 July 2021	Croke Park, Dublin	2-14 – 2-8	Connacht Final
24 April 2022	MacHale Park, Castlebar	1-14 – 0-16	Connacht Quarter-Final
25 June 2023	Pearse Stadium, Galway	0-12 – 1-10	All-Ireland Preliminary Quarter-finals
5 May 2024	Pearse Stadium, Galway	0-16 – 0-15	Connacht Final
4 May 2025	MacHale Park, Castlebar	1-17 – 1-15	Connacht Final
