= 1937 All-Ireland Senior Football Championship final =

- Event: 1937 All-Ireland Senior Football Championship
Kerry	Cavan
2–5 (11)	1–8 (11)
- Date: 26 September 1937
- Venue: Croke Park, Dublin
- Referee: M Hennessy (Clare)
- Attendance: 52,325

1937 All-Ireland Senior Football Championship final replay
Kerry	Cavan
4–4 (16)	1–7 (10)
- Date: 17 October 1937
- Venue: Croke Park, Dublin
- Referee: M Hennessy (Clare)
- Attendance: 51,234

The 1937 All-Ireland Senior Football Championship final was the fiftieth All-Ireland Final and the deciding match of the 1937 All-Ireland Senior Football Championship, an inter-county Gaelic football tournament for the top teams in Ireland.

== Matches ==
=== Summary ===
The Radio Athlone commentator mistakenly announced Cavan as the winners of the first game; Packie Boylan's late point had been disallowed. Kerry won the replay by six points, with goals by Tim O'Leary (2), Miko Doyle and John Joe Landers.

It was the fourth of five All-Ireland SFC titles won by Kerry in the 1930s.

=== Details ===
26 Sep 1939
Final

Kerry	2–5 – 1–8	Cavan
Gls: John Joe Landers (2); Pts: Charlie O'Sullivan, Gearóid Fitzgerald, John Joe Landers, Tim O'Donnell Camp & Tim Landers (1) each.		Gls: P. Boylan (1). Pts: M.J Magee (3), P. Delvin (2), J. Smallhorne, V. White & L. Blessing (1) each.

Croke Park, Dublin
Referee: M Hennessy (Clare)
Attendance: 52,325

17 Oct 1939
Replay

Kerry	4–4 – 1–7	Cavan
Gls: John Joe Landers & Miko Doyle (1) & Tim O'Leary (2) each. Pts: Tim Landers (4).		Gls: L. Blessing (1). Pts: M.J. Magee (3), P. Delvin & V. White (2) each.

Croke Park, Dublin
Referee: M Hennessy (Clare)
Attendance: 51,234

Kerry
Cavan

Official programmes for the final (left) and playoff (right)

==== Kerry ====
- 1 Dan O'Keeffe
- 2 Bill Kinnerk
- 3 Joe Keohane
- 4 Billy Myers
- 5 Tim O'Donnell
- 6 Bill Dillon
- 7 Tadhg Healy
- 8 Johnny Walsh
- 9 Seán Brosnan
- 10 J. Flavin
- 11 Charlie O'Sullivan
- 12 Tim Landers
- 13 J. J. Landers
- 14 Miko Doyle (c)
- 15 Tim O'Leary

Subs used
Tom O'Connor for O'Donnell

Played in drawn game
Gearóid Fitzgerald
Paddy Kennedy
Seán McCarthy
