= Kerry–Kildare Gaelic football rivalry =

Sports rivalry in Ireland

Kerry-Kildare
- Location: County Kerry; County Kildare
- Teams: Kerry; Kildare
- First meeting: Kerry 1-4 - 1-3 Kildare; 1903 All-Ireland home final (23 July 1905)
- Latest meeting: Kerry 3-22 - 0-17 Kildare; 2026 All-Ireland qualifiers (13 June 2026)

Statistics
- Total meetings: 14
- Most wins: Kerry (9)
- All-time series: Kerry 9-2-3 Kildare
- Largest victory: Kerry 7-16 - 0-10 Kildare; 2015 All-Ireland quarter-final (2 August 2015)

The Kerry-Kildare rivalry is a Gaelic football rivalry between Irish county teams Kerry and Kildare, who first played each other in 1903. It was considered to be one of the biggest rivalries in Gaelic games during the 1920s. Kerry's home ground is Fitzgerald Stadium and Kildare's home ground is St. Conleth's Park, however, all of their championship meetings have been held at neutral venues, usually Croke Park.

While Kerry have the highest number of Munster titles and Kildare lie in third position behind Dublin and Meath on the roll of honour in Leinster, they have also enjoyed success in the All-Ireland Senior Football Championship, having won 41 championship titles between them to date.

== All-time results ==
=== Legend ===
Kerry win
Kildare win
Match was a draw

=== Senior ===
No.	Date	Winners	Score	Runners-up	Venue	Stage
1.	23 July 1905	Kerry	1-4 - 1-3	Kildare	Tipperary	All Ireland home-final
2.	27 August 1905	Kerry	0-7 - 1-4	Kildare	Cork	All Ireland home-final replay
3.	15 October 1905	Kerry	0-8 - 0-2	Kildare	Cork	All Ireland home-final 2nd replay
4.	16 June 1906	Kildare	1-7 - 0-5	Kerry	Thurles	All Ireland final
5.	5 September 1926	Kerry	1-3 - 0-6	Kildare	Croke Park	All Ireland final
6.	17 October 1926	Kerry	1-4 - 0-4	Kildare	Croke Park	All Ireland final replay
7.	25 September 1927	Kildare	0-5 - 0-3	Kerry	Croke Park	All Ireland final
8.	22 September 1929	Kerry	1-8 - 1-5	Kildare	Croke Park	All Ireland final
9.	27 September 1931	Kerry	1-11 - 0-8	Kildare	Croke Park	All Ireland final
10.	30 August 1998	Kildare	0-13 - 1-9	Kerry	Croke Park	All Ireland semi-final
11.	27 July 2002	Kerry	2-10 - 1-5	Kildare	Semple Stadium	All Ireland qualifier round 4
12.	2 August 2015	Kerry	7-16 - 0-10	Kildare	Croke Park	All Ireland quarter-final
13.	4 August 2018	Kerry	3-25 - 2-16	Kildare	Fitzgerald Stadium	All Ireland quarter-final group stage
14.	13 June 2026	Kerry	3-22 - 0-17	Kildare	St Conleth's Park	All-Ireland qualifier Round 2B
