= 1926 All-Ireland Senior Football Championship final =

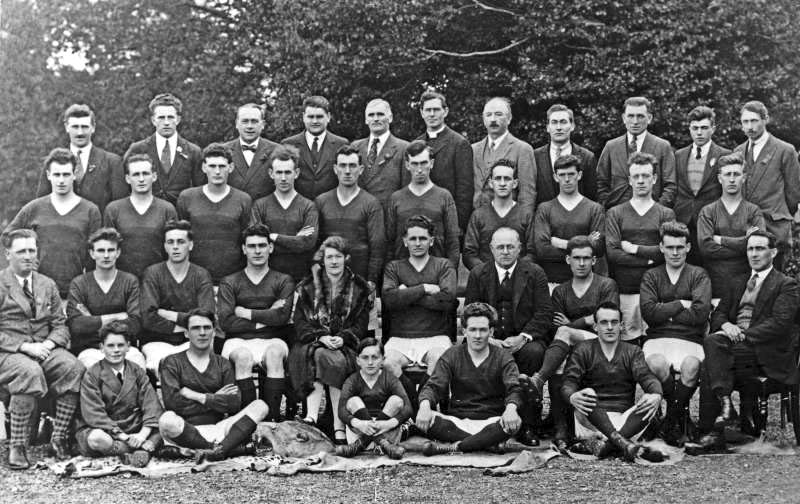
- Kerry, champions
- Event: 1926 All-Ireland Senior Football Championship
Kerry	Kildare
1–3 (6)	0–6 (6)
- Date: 5 September 1926
- Venue: Croke Park, Dublin
- Referee: T Shevlin (Roscommon)
- Attendance: 37,500
- Weather: Wet

1926 All-Ireland Senior Football Championship final replay
Kerry	Kildare
1–4 (7)	0–4 (4)
- Date: 17 October 1926
- Venue: Croke Park, Dublin
- Referee: T Shevlin (Roscommon)
- Attendance: 35,500

The 1926 All-Ireland Senior Football Championship Final was the 39th All-Ireland Final and the deciding match of the 1926 All-Ireland Senior Football Championship, an inter-county Gaelic football tournament for the top teams in Ireland.

== Background ==
Although this was a first appearance in the decider since 1919 for Kildare, 1926 began a run of four consecutive All-Ireland SFC finals featuring Kildare.

== Paths to the final ==
Kerry defeated Cavan by 1–6 to 0–1 in the first semi-final. Kildare defeated Galway by 2–5 to 0–2 in the second semi-final.

== Matches ==
=== Summary ===
The final was played on 5 September. A last-minute goal by Bill Gorman (Kerry) forced a draw. After the game, Kerry's centre-back Jack Murphy put his clothes back on without taking off his playing gear, and died of pneumonia before the replay. He was 22 years of age.

The Kingdom (Kerry) won the replay, with a Nathan O'Reilly goal. The replay was played on 17 October.

It was the second of three All-Ireland SFC titles won by Kerry in the 1920s, which made them joint "team of the decade" with Dublin, also winner of three.

=== Details ===
17 October 1926
Final

Kerry	1-4 (7) – (4) 0-4	Kildare

Croke Park, Dublin
Referee: T Shevlin (Roscommon)

Kerry	Kildare

1	Johnny Riordan
2	Pat Clifford
3	Joe Barrett
4	Jack Walsh
5	Paul Russell
6	Jerry Moriarty
7	John Slattery
8	Con Brosnan
9	Bob Stack
10	John Ryan
11	Denis O'Connell
12	Tom O'Mahony
13	J. J. Sheehy (c)
14	Jimmy Bailey
15	Bill Gorman
Played in drawn game:
John Murphy
Joe O'Sullivan
Phil O'Sullivan

1
2
3
4
5
6
7
8
9
10
11
12
13
14
15
