= Paddy Whitty =

Irish Gaelic footballer

Personal information
- Native name: Pádraig de Fuite (Irish)
- Born: 25 July 1908 Tralee, County Kerry, Ireland
- Died: March 1994 (aged 85) London, England
- Occupation: Publican

Sport
- Sport: Gaelic football
- Position: Full-forward
Club
- Years: Club
- John Mitchels
Club titles
- Kerry titles: 2
Inter-county
- Years: County
- 1926-1936: Kerry
Inter-county titles
- Munster titles: 8
- All-Irelands: 4
- NFL: 3

Patrick Desmond Whitty (25 July 1908 – March 1994) was an Irish Gaelic footballer who played at club level with John Mitchels and at inter-county level with the Kerry senior football team. He played both in defence and as a forward.

== Playing career ==
Whitty first came to Gaelic football prominence as a member of the John Mitchels club that won County Championship titles in 1929 and 1937. He was just 18-years-old when he was drafted onto the Kerry senior football team and was a member of the team that won the All-Ireland Championship in 1926, however, he didn't receive a winners' medal. Whitty was also a member of the Kerry team that won the title in 1930 but did not appear in the All-Ireland final win over Monaghan. He claimed back-to-back All-Ireland medals on the field of play in 1931 and 1932. Whitty's other honours with Kerry include being involved in eight Munster Championship-winning teams and two National Football League medals on the field of play. He also won a Railway Cup medal with Munster.

== Personal life and death ==
Born in Tralee, County Kerry, Whitty emigrated to London in 1939. He spent most of his working life there in the pub trade. Whitty was also a mainstay of the Kerry Association in London.

Whitty died in March 1994.

== Honours ==
John Mitchels

- Kerry Senior Football Championship: 1929, 1937

Kerry

- All-Ireland Senior Football Championship: 1926, 1930, 1931, 1932, 1937
- Munster Senior Football Championship: 1926, 1927, 1930, 1931, 1932, 1933, 1934, 1936
- National Football League: 1927–28, 1930–31, 1931–32

Munster

- Railway Cup: 1931
