= Jackie Ryan =

Irish Gaelic footballer (1904–1954)

- Ryan as a Kerry All Ireland footballer
- Born: John Ryan; 11 August 1904; Ardfert, County Kerry, Ireland
- Died: 17 February 1954; Tralee, County Kerry, Ireland
- Resting place: Rath, Tralee, County Kerry, Ireland
- Spouse: Aggie Ryan

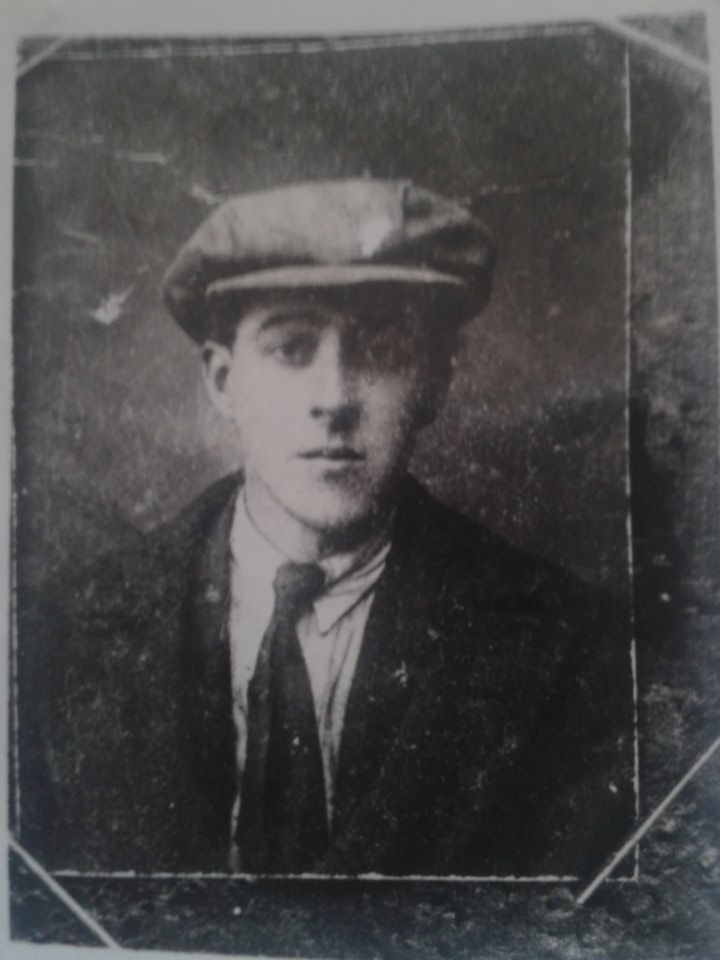
Picture of Jackie Ryan, inscription on back: Jacky Ryan, Tralee Date unknown

Kerry team training on board a transatlantic ship in 1931. Ryan is in the second row.

1930 All Ireland Senior Football Champions. Ryan is the first man on the left in the front row.

Jackie (John) Ryan (11 August 1904 – 17 February 1954) was an Irish Gaelic footballer who primarily played as a Half Forward as well as in the Full Forward line for the Kerry senior team between 1924 and 1934. Ryan won six All-Ireland Senior Football medals with Kerry over his ten-year career and received favourable reviews.

Ryan was born in Ardfert, before moving to Pembroke Street and later to Dawson's Terrace, Rock Street, Tralee. He died in Tralee in 1954. Ryan married Agnes Mary (Aggie) Sheehy in Tralee on 25 September 1928. They had one child who died in infancy.

== Family ==
Ryan's parents were Christopher Ryan, a sergeant in the Royal Irish Constabulary, and Mary Josephine McDonnell. Both Christopher and Mary Josephine were from Cork. Ryan's sisters were Babe Ryan who for many years was Postmistress in Killiardrish, Canovee GAA, County Cork, and Dolly Ryan O'Connor, who lived in Tralee. He had four brothers: Christy, Hugh, Jim and Pat.

== Career ==
Ryan commenced his career with Kerry back in 1923. A year later he scored a goal against Mayo in a semi-final. Reports of the 1924 All-Ireland final reads, "Jackie Ryan showed the style of a master craftsman with superb fielding and passing as Kerry defeated Dublin by 1–5 to 1 3". He collected his first County Championship medal in hurling that year with Tralee Parnells. On to 1925, he won the County Championship both in Football and Hurling with Tralee. His second Senior All Ireland medal came in 1926. In the semi-final against Cavan, Jackie struck a pile driver past Kiernan in the Cavan goals and later scored the best point of the game from over 50 yards out. Kerry defeated Kildare after a replay in an epic All-Ireland final. He also won his second Kerry County Championship medal that year with Tralee. In 1927 he won his only Railway Cup medal with Munster. He won his first National League medal in 1928 when Kerry defeated Kildare, the reigning All Ireland Champions in the final. Ryan won his third County Championship medal, this time with Boherbee. He won his second National League medal and his third All-Ireland medal.

In 1932 Kerry was going for their first four in-a-row to equal Wexford's record. The headlines after the game read, "Ryan and Landers switch did the trick". This was Ryan's sixth and final All-Ireland medal.

He also collected his third National League medal in 1932 and won his last Kerry County Championship medal when Rock Street defeated North Kerry by one point in the county final. He won his last two major medals in 1933 and 1934, bringing his total of Munster Championship medals to nine. He played 39 championship games for Kerry between 1923 and 1934.

=== Internment ===
Ryan was one of a number of Kerrymen interned at the Curragh 1922–1923.

Mainly a hurler until then, it was there that he honed his Gaelic Football skills. On release the ex-internees played two challenge games in early 1924 against the current Kerry team. They were defeated 5 points to one in the first game but won the second by four goals and four points to four points.

He played for Kerry from 1924 until his retirement in 1932.

=== In the press ===
As the 1920s were approaching, football had yet to get a real stranglehold on the county. Along the lanes and streets of Tralee and in the fields of north Kerry, some fine hurlers were emerging. Jackie Ryan was still a teenager in 1919 when the county board called a special meeting to discuss the state of Gaelic games in Kerry. Din Joe Baily – a man under whose gentle and politically-neutral watch the games in the county prospered – was influential on the board at the time and after this meeting had concluded, Kerry saw a clear road ahead. Importantly, the backbone of the team that would dominate the coming decade – with Jackie Ryan as a vital cog – was also forming.

On the field, Ryan was regarded as a crafty, scientific forward. 'When Mikey Sheehy was growing up, people in Austin Stacks used to say he's going to be another Jackie Ryan', says Barrett. 'That was the cut of a player he was. Total style. He had this extraordinary talent for chipping the ball when it was rolling away from him', he says. 'That was his trademark. And we're talking about a time when players wore cumbersome, orthopaedic boots with big steel toe caps.

Tipp came surging back in search of victory but Barrett held his ground and kept them at bay. When Tipperary started to tire John Joe Sheehy took the lead for Kerry with a point from a free and then Jackie Ryan blasted an unstoppable shot into the back of Tipperary's net.

Still the initiative had been very definitely taken from Mayo, and by the end of the third quarter Kerry had gone five points ahead. Three of the points, by Jackie Ryan, came. off frees to Tim Landers, and the other two were scored by Con Brosnan and Miko Doyle. (1932 All Ireland Final)

One ball rules all others in Kerry though and it is the love and respect for that ball which is why they rule. For every hour Tadghie Lyne spent on the hardfloor, he'd spend countless others in his garage, kicking and catching a football suspended by its laces from the rafters, or in Fitzgerald Stadium, attempting points from the corner flag. Jackie Ryan would hone on Rock Street the knack of chipping the rolling ball.

== Awards, championships and recognition ==
- 1924 All-Ireland Senior Football Championship Final
- 1926 All-Ireland Senior Football Championship
- 1929 All-Ireland Senior Football Championship
- 1930 All-Ireland Senior Football Championship
- 1931 All-Ireland Senior Football Championship
- 1932 All-Ireland Senior Football Championship Final
- Four National League medals
- Kerry team of the Millennium 1900–1949
- Three Railway Cup medals. He played every year from 1924 to 1932 for Munster.
- He was selected to play for Ireland in the 1932 Tailteann Games
- He won numerous Kerry County Football and Hurling Championship Medals with Rock Street. (9 Munster Championships, 3 County Championships - Hurling)
- He was selected on the 1900–1949 Kerry Team of the Millennium in 1999.
- In 1954 he was selected on the Greatest Football Team of All Time (until then) in the Irish Press.
