= Timothy O'Donnell =

Timothy O'Donnell or Tim O'Donnell may refer to:

- Timothy T. O'Donnell, Catholic theologian
- Timothy O'Donnell (triathlete) (born 1980), American triathlete
- Tim O'Donnell (director), American television director
- Tim O'Donnell (Gaelic footballer) (1907–2003), Irish Gaelic footballer
