= Dan O'Keeffe =

Kerry Gaelic football goalkeeper

Personal information
- Native name: Dónall Ó Caoimh (Irish)
- Nickname: Danno
- Died: 2 June 1967 Tralee, County Kerry, Ireland
- Occupation: Clerical officer
- Height: 5 ft 10 in (178 cm)

Sport
- Sport: Gaelic football
- Position: Goalkeeper
Club
- Years: Club
- Kerins O'Rahilly's
Club titles
- Kerry titles: 2
Inter-county
Years	County	Apps (scores)
1931–1948	Kerry	66 (0–00)
Inter-county titles
- Munster titles: 14
- All-Irelands: 7
- NFL: 2

Dan O'Keeffe (died 2 June 1967), known as "Danno", was an Irish Gaelic footballer, regarded by some as the greatest goalkeeper in the history of the sport.

== Career ==
O'Keeffe's family moved to Tralee, County Kerry when he was nine years old. His first competitive football was played with a junior team, the Rangers, but when he advanced to senior grade he joined Kerins O'Rahilly's and with them won two County Championship titles. O'Keeffe made his first inter-county appearance on the Kerry junior team that won the All-Ireland Junior Championship in 1930. A year later he was the substitute goalkeeper on the Kerry senior team to meet Kildare in the All-Ireland final, however, a few hours before the game he was informed that he would be playing and collected his first winners' medal. O'Keeffe was first-choice goalkeeper for seventeen years in total and claimed a then record of seven All-Ireland Championship titles. His other honours include a record 14 Munster Championship medals and two National League titles. O'Keeffe was also a regular on the Munster team and won three Railway Cup medals, including one as captain of the team. Playing until he was 41 years old, he was posthumously named on the Football Team of the Century and the Football Team of the Millennium.

== Personal life and death ==
O'Keeffe worked for Kerry County Council in Tralee and was eventually promoted to the post of Clerical Officer in charge of the staff on the roads division. He married Mary Moriarty in 1939 and had two children. O'Keeffe died suddenly on 2 June 1967.

== Honours ==
Kerins O'Rahilly's

- Kerry Senior Football Championship: 1933, 1939

Kerry

- All-Ireland Senior Football Championship: 1931, 1932, 1937, 1939, 1940, 1941, 1946
- Munster Senior Football Championship: 1932, 1933, 1934, 1936, 1937, 1938, 1939, 1940, 1941, 1942, 1944, 1946, 1947, 1948
- National Football League: 1930–31, 1931–32
- All-Ireland Junior Football Championship: 1930
- Munster Junior Football Championship: 1930

Munster

- Railway Cup: 1931, 1941 (c), 1948

Sporting positions
Preceded by Miko Doyle	Kerry Senior Football Captain; 1934–1936	Succeeded by Miko Doyle
