= Tom O'Connor (Gaelic footballer) =

Irish Gaelic footballer

Tom "Gega" O'Connor
Personal information
- Native name: Tomás Ó Conchubhair (Irish)
- Nickname: Gega
- Born: 3 November 1918 Dingle, County Kerry, Ireland
- Died: 26 February 1997 (aged 78) Rockaway, New York, United States
- Occupation: Publican
- Height: 5 ft 9 in (175 cm)

Sport
- Sport: Gaelic football
- Position: Centre-forward
Club
- Years: Club
- Dingle
Club titles
- Kerry titles: 6
Inter-county*
Years	County	Apps (scores)
1937-1948	Kerry	37 (7-47)
Inter-county titles
- Munster titles: 8
- All-Irelands: 5
- NFL: 0
- *Inter County team apps and scores correct as of 17:18, 18 June 2020.

Thomas O'Connor (3 November 1918 – 26 February 1997) was an Irish Gaelic footballer. At club level he played with Dingle GAA club and was an All-Ireland Championship-winning captain with the Kerry senior football team.

== Playing career ==
Born in Dingle, O'Connor first enjoyed footballing success at provincial level as a student with Dingle CBS. He progressed to inter-county level as captain of the Kerry minor football team that lost to Louth in the 1936 All-Ireland final. O'Connor was a late addition to the Kerry senior team the following year and claimed his first All-Ireland Senior Football Championship medal after coming on as a substitute in the replay defeat of Cavan. He claimed a second All-Ireland winners' medal as Kerry's team captain in the 1939 All-Ireland championship, the first of three successive final victories. O'Connor won a fifth and final championship in the 1946 competition. During his 11-year inter-county career, he claimed eight Munster Championship medals. O'Connor was also involved in all six of Dingle's county senior championship victories, and was a two-time Railway Cup-winner with Munster.

== Honours ==
Dingle

- Kerry Senior Football Championship (6): 1938, 1940, 1941, 1943, 1944, 1948

Kerry

- All-Ireland Senior Football Championship (5): 1937, 1939 (c), 1940, 1941, 1946
- Munster Senior Football Championship (8): 1938, 1939 (c), 1940, 1941, 1942, -1946, 1947, 1948

Munster

- Railway Cup (2): 1941, 1949

Sporting positions
Preceded by Bill Kinnerk	Kerry Senior Football Captain; 1939	Succeeded by Seán Brosnan
Preceded by Seán Brosnan	Kerry Senior Football Captain; 1939	Succeeded by Dan Spring
Preceded by Bill Dillon	Kerry Senior Football Captain; 1942	Succeeded by Johnny Walsh
Achievements
Preceded by John Dunne	All-Ireland Senior Football Final winning captain 1939	Succeeded by Dan Spring
