= Con Brosnan =

Irish Gaelic footballer (1900-1975)

Personal information
- Native name: Conchur Ó Brosnacháin (Irish)
- Born: 27 December 1900 Moyvane, County Kerry, Ireland
- Died: 12 August 1975 (aged 74) Moyvane, County Kerry, Ireland
- Occupation: Publican
- Height: 5 ft 11 in (180 cm)

Sport
- Sport: Gaelic football
- Position: Midfield
Clubs
- Years: Club
- Newtownsandes → North Kerry
Club titles
- Kerry titles: 0
Inter-county
Years	County	Apps (scores)
1923-1933	Kerry	39 (3-07)
Inter-county titles
- Munster titles: 9
- All-Irelands: 6
- NFL: 4

Cornelius Brosnan (27 December 1900 – 12 August 1975) was an Irish Gaelic footballer, selector and trainer. At club level he played with Newtownsandes and at inter-county level with the Kerry senior football team. He usually lined out at midfield.

== Career ==
Brosnan played with the Newtownsandes club from 1917. In 1923, he was selected for the Kerry senior football team, which lost the All-Ireland final to Dublin. The following year he won the first of six All-Ireland Championships. Partnering Bob Stack at midfield, Brosnan scored twice in the one-point victory over Dublin. A second winners' medal followed in 1926 after a replay against Kildare in which he played despite illness. In 1927 he was part of the Kerry panel that toured the United States and of the Munster team that won the inaugural Railway Cup. Brosnan's remaining All-Ireland medals were won during Kerry's record-equaling four-in-a-row achievement from 1929 to 1932, being team captain when they defeated Kildare in 1931. Renowned for his physique, fielding, and ability to kick points, he also won nine Munster Championship titles, four consecutive National League titles and was included on the national team in the Tailteann Games. In retirement from playing Brosnan remained closely linked with Kerry football and trained the team to All-Ireland victories in 1939 and 1940.

== Personal life and death ==
Educated at St. Michael's College in Listowel, Brosnan joined the Irish Volunteers and Sinn Féin in 1917. He participated in a series of engagements during the War of Independence and was among the party that killed District Inspector Tobias O'Sullivan in December 1920. After the Anglo-Irish Treaty Brosnan immediately joined the Free State Army. He resigned his army commission in 1933 when holding the rank of captain, and in the general election of that year unsuccessfully ran as a Cumann na nGaedheal candidate for Kerry. He was also a member of the Army Comrades Association. Brosnan married Catherine Walsh in 1925 and had three sons and a daughter. Two of their sons, Mick and Jim, won an All-Ireland medals with Kerry.

Brosnan died in Moyvane on 12 August 1975.

== Honours ==
=== Player ===
Kerry

- All-Ireland Senior Football Championship: 1924, 1926, 1929, 1930, 1931 (c), 1932
- Munster Senior Football Championship: 1923, 1924, 1925, 1926, 1927, 1929, 1930, 1931 (c), 1932
- National Football League: 1927–28, 1928–29, 1930–31 (c), 1931–32

Munster

- Railway Cup: 1927, 1931

=== Trainer ===
Kerry

- All-Ireland Senior Football Championship: 1939, 1940
- Munster Senior Football Championship: 1939, 1940

Sporting positions
Preceded by John Joe Sheehy	Kerry senior football team captain 1926	Succeeded by Joe Barrett
Achievements
Preceded by John Joe Sheehy	All-Ireland Senior Football Final winning captain 1931	Succeeded by Joe Barrett
