= Joe Barrett =

Irish sportsperson

Personal information
- Native name: Seosamh Bairéid (Irish)
- Born: 17 July 1902 Tralee, County Kerry
- Died: 2 June 1952 (aged 49)

Sport
- Sport: Gaelic football
- Position: Full-back
Club
- Years: Club
- 1920s-1930s: Austin Stack's
Club titles
	Football	Hurling
Kerry titles	5	4
Inter-county
Years	County	Apps (scores)
1923-1933	Kerry	15
Inter-county titles
- Munster titles: 8
- All-Irelands: 6
- NFL: 2

Joe Barrett (17 July 1902 – 2 June 1952) was an Irish sportsperson. He played Gaelic football with his local club Austin Stack's and was a member of the Kerry senior inter-county team from 1923 until 1933. Barrett captained Kerry to the All-Ireland titles of 1929 and 1932.

== Biography ==
Joe Barrett was born in Tralee in 1902. The third of five sons and six daughters, his father, John Barrett (1858–1915), was a well known pig and cattle dealer while his mother, Nora O’Mahony, hailed from Ballyduff. The influences in his family home were strongly Roman Catholic and nationalist. It were these views that shaped his outlook in his adulthood. Barrett received a brief national school education, however, in 1915 he followed his older brother, Christy, into the family business. World War I was raging at the time and the export of bacon and other meats created a huge demand which kept the Barrett's gainfully employed through their agency for the two local bacon factories.

Tragedy was to strike the family again two years later when the eldest brother, Christy, died at the age of 30 after contracting pneumonia during the great flu epidemic. The onus then fell on Joe and his fourteen-year-old brother Jimmy to hold the business together, however, in spite of the economic realities of the time the Barrett's survived.

At the age of fifteen Barrett joined the Irish Volunteers, a revolutionary organisation that hoped to established independence for Ireland. He remained active during the War of Independence. He took the republican side in the subsequent Civil War that followed the signing of the Anglo-Irish Treaty. Barrett was arrested in September 1922 and suffered much hardship during his imprisonment. While in prisoned he embarked on a 22-day hunger strike which undoubtedly affected his health in later life. Upon his release Barrett and his siblings set about rebuilding their business. It proved difficult at a time when political tensions divided friends and neighbours and boycotts of certain shops and businesses were regular occurrences.

In 1935 Barrett married Kitty Barrett (1912–2009) from Fenit and together they had four children. John, the eldest of the family, was a noted sports journalist with the Kerryman, the Irish Press and the Irish Post before his untimely death in 1995. Tim, who died in a motor accident at the age of 35, captained the Kerry minors in the 1954 All-Ireland final. He was also a high-ranking trade union official in Dublin. A third son, Jo Jo Barrett, was a well known journalist and author who lived in Bray, and later Ardfert, until his death in 2021. He won under-21 and senior All-Ireland medals with Kerry in the 1960s.

At the age of forty-five Barrett's health started to decline. He died on 2 June 1952, just a month short of his fiftieth birthday.

Long after his death Barrett's son, Joe Joe, wrote In the name of the Game, a book about how his father and other footballers such as John Joe Sheehy and Con Brosnan were joined by their love of Gaelic football but took opposite sides in the Civil War. In 2007 he was enraged when it was announced that God Save the Queen would be played at Croke Park due to Ireland's rugby international with England. Barrett withdrew his father's medal collection from the adjoining GAA museum in protest.

== Playing career ==
=== Club ===
Barrett played his club football and hurling with the famous Austin Stack's team in the 1920s and 1930s and enjoyed much success.

Before 1928 the club had never won a county title in either code of Gaelic games, however, through Barrett's inspired leadership that was about to change. The county football decider saw Austin Stack's take on Kerins O'Rahilly's with Barrett lining out as captain of his team. Goals at key times won the games for the Tralee-based club and a 3–4 to 0–7 victory gave Barrett and his club a first-ever county senior football championship title. That same year Barrett captained the Austin Stack's hurling team in the county championship decider. A local Tralee derby ensued as nearby neighbours John Mitchels provided the opposition. They proved no match on the day as Austin Stack's easily won the game by 4–2 to 0–2. It was a first county senior hurling championship winners' medal for Barrett.

In 1929 Austin Stack's reached a second consecutive county final in both codes. While the club surrendered their football crown to John Mitchels, the hurling championship decider saw more success coming Barrett's way. Another rout took place as John Mitchels were defeated for the second year in-a-row by a score line of 5–2 to 0–6.

1930 saw Austin Stack's line out in a third consecutive county football final. Kerins O'Rahill's were the opponents and an exciting game developed between these two great rivals. Austin Stack's goal-scoring abilities proved decisive again as Barrett's side collected a second title in three years on a score line of 4–4 to 2–5.

In 1931, Barrett was again captain of the Austin Stack's hurling and football teams and guided both sides to their respective county finals. In the football decider fierce local rivals John Mitchels provided the opposition in a bid to stop the march of Barrett's side. The game was a close affair but two key goals for Austin Stack's sealed a 2–7 to 1–3 victory and a third county football title for Barrett. That year Austin Stack's lined out in the county hurling decider. Kilflynn provided the opposition and an incredibly high-scoring game developed. Fifteen goals were scored in total, however, an 8–2 to 7–3 score line gave Austin Stack's a two-point win and gave Barrett a third county hurling championship winners' medal.

Austin Stack's continued their dominance of Gaelic games in Kerry again in 1932. A fifth consecutive county football championship final appearance beckoned with divisional side North Kerry providing the opposition. A close encounter was the order of the day with Barrett's side fighting tooth-and-nail to gain the upper-hand. After a thrilling sixty minutes Austin Stack's were the champions by 2–3 to 1–5 and Barrett added a fourth county winners' medal to his collection inside of five years. It was his fourth time captaining his club to the county football title.

Four county football titles in-a-row was beyond this great team, however, Austin Stack's lined out in the county hurling decider again in 1933. Causeway were the opponents, however, Barrett captained his side to a fourth county final victory since 1928.

After a few years out of the limelight Austin Stack's fought back to reach the county football decider of 1936. It was the last kick of the great team that had dominated football in 'the Kingdom' for much of the previous decade. Kerins O'Rahilly's were the opponents and a low-scoring and close game developed. At the long whistle a 0–6 to 0–4 score line gave Austin Stack's the win and gave Barrett a fifth county football winners' medal.

=== Inter-county ===
Barrett first came to prominence on the inter-county scene as a member of the Kerry senior football team in the early 1920s. It was a time when Kerry was still a divided county following the horrors of the Civil War. Many people believed that some of the Kerry players would never line out together again due to their respective allegiances during the revolutionary period, however, football proved to be a healing force for the people of 'the Kingdom'. After the fighting, Irish Free State army captain Con Brosnan managed to get safe passage guarantees for Republican players like John Joe Sheehy and Barrett to play games, and together they used football to help overcome the bitterness. In 1923 Kerry won the Munster title. While Barrett played no part in that game he was included in the starting fifteen for Kerry's subsequent All-Ireland final against Dublin. Kerry started well with Con Brosnan scoring a goal from fifty yards out to help his side to a 1–2 to 0–1 lead at half-time. John Joe Sheehy scored a point, Kerry's only score in the second-half, as 'the Dubs' took control. P. J. Kirwan scored Dublin's second-half goal while Paddy McDonnell, Jack Murphy and Joe Stynes chipped in with a point each to halt Kerry's march. A 1–5 to 1–3 score line gave Dublin the title and resulted in defeat for Barrett and Kerry.

In 1924 Barrett lined out in his first Munster final Clare provided the opposition on that occasion and an absolute rout ensued. Clare proved no match for 'the Kingdom', who won the provincial decider by 5–8 to 2–2. It was Barrett's first Munster winners' medal on the field of play. Kerry later qualified for a second consecutive All-Ireland final. Dublin, the team that had put Barrett's side to the sword in the previous year's final, provided the opposition again. A close game developed with neither side taking a decisive lead. In the dying moments of the game John Baily had a goal disallowed for Kerry, however, Con Brosnan popped up to clinch the winning point. A 0–4 to 0–3 score line gave Kerry the title and gave Barrett his first All-Ireland winners' medal.

In 1925 Kerry faced Clare in the provincial decider once again. While Clare were completely outclassed the previous year, the 1925 Munster final proved to be a massacre. A 5–5 to 0–0 score line gave Kerry the win and gave Barrett a second Munster winners' medal. Kerry later defeated Cavan in the All-Ireland semi-final, however, there would be no All-Ireland final appearance for 'the Kingdom'. Both Cavan and Kerry were disqualified from the championship over a new county of residence 'declaration' rule.

The provincial series posed little difficulty for Kerry again in 1926. An 0–11 to 1–4 defeat of Tipperary gave Barrett a third consecutive Munster winners' medal. The subsequent All-Ireland final saw Kerry take on Kildare and a close game developed. The All-Ireland title looked to be heading to Kildare, however, Bill Gorman scored a 59th-minute equaliser for Kerry to force a draw. The replay was sad affair as Kerry's Jack Murphy died of pneumonia between the drawn encounter and the second game. Another close game was the order of the day, however, Tom O'Mahony was the hero of the day. His second-half goal proved to be a match-winner as Kildare hit the woodwork three times. A 1–4 to 0–4 score line gave Kerry the win and gave Barrett a second All-Ireland winners' medal.

In 1927 Kerry faced Clare in the Munster final for the third time in four years. The result was similar to the two previous occasions as 'the Kingdom' emerged victorious by 4–4 to 1–3. It was Barrett's fourth Munster winners' medal. For the second year in-a-row Kerry and Kildare did battle in the championship decider. Kerry raced into a three-point lead early in the opening half, however, that seemed to be their lot for the day. Kildare bounced back with a succession of points to give them a 0–5 to 0–3 lead. With five minutes to go John Joe Sheehy breached the Kildare defence, however, his shot at goal hit the post. The scores remained the same for the last few minutes and Barrett's side were defeated.

In 1928 Kerry dominated the newly created National Football League. Kildare, the other outstanding team of the era, provided the opposition in the final. A 2–4 to 1–6 sealed the victory for Kerry and a first National League medal for Barrett. Kerry failed to retain the Munster crown for a sixth consecutive occasion late that year, however, the team bounced back the following year with Barrett serving as captain for the year. The National League final saw Kerry take on Kildare again. A narrow 1–7 to 2–3 score line gave Barrett's team a second consecutive title in football's secondary competition. In the subsequent Munster championship a 1–14 to 1–2 trouncing of old rivals Clare gave Kerry the title again and gave Barrett a fifth provincial winners' medal. The All-Ireland final that year pitted Kerry against reigning champions Kildare for the third time in four years. Ned Sweeney's first-half goal gave Kerry a lift and was enough to survive a great comeback by Kildare. John Joe Sheehy and Paul Doyle scored five points each from frees while Paddy Martin landed a 30-yard drop-kick into the net for Kildare's only goal of the day. It was not enough, however, as Kerry won the game by 1–8 to 1–5. With that Barrett collected a third All-Ireland winners' medal, while he also became the first Kerry man to lift the Sam Maguire Cup.

In 1930 this Kerry team were beginning to carve out a reputation as one of the best to ever represent the county. The Munster final saw Tipperary provide the opposition, however, a 3–4 to 1–2 score line gave Kerry the win. It was a sixth Munster title for Barrett. Kerry reached the All-Ireland final again, this time with Monaghan providing the opposition. Peter McConnon opened the scoring for Monaghan, however, Kerry dominated the rest of the game. John Joe Landers, Ned Sweeny and John Joe Sheehy scored three goals for Kerry while Monaghan could only manage one other point. A huge 3–11 to 0–2 score line gave Kerry the title and gave Barrett a fourth All-Ireland winners' medal.

In 1931 Barrett was in line for the Kerry captaincy again, however, he gave the captaincy to Con Brosnan in recognition of the latter's magnificent contribution to Kerry both on the football field and off. It was another move to heal the scars of the Civil War tensions. That year's Munster final saw Kerry line out against Tipperary. Another rout ensued as a 5–8 to 0–2 score line gave Kerry the title and gave Barrett an impressive seventh Munster title. Kildare hoped to stop a Kerry three-in-a-row in the subsequent All-Ireland final and gave a good account of themselves. The Leinster men took a 0–6 to 0–4 lead at half-time, however, a series of positional switches saw Kerry lead by 0–10 to 0–7 coming into the final stage of the game. A mix-up between the Kildare goalkeeper and full-back saw Kerry score the only goal of the contest. This took the win out of Kildare's sails as 'the Kingdom' went on to secure athird consecutive title with a 1–11 to 0–8 score line. It was Barrett's fifth All-Ireland winners' medal.

In 1932 Barrett took over the captaincy of the Kerry team for the second time. It was an historic year as Kerry were going for four-in-a-row, a feat only ever achieved by Wexford. The Munster series of games proved no obstacle for 'the Kingdom'. A 3–10 to 1–4 defeat of Tipperary gave Barrett an eighth provincial winners' medal. The All-Ireland final had a new twist to it as Mayo provided the opposition. In a similar pattern to the previous year, Kerry trailed at half-time, however, Bill Landers scored a quick goal straight after the interval. Mayo could only muster one goal in the second period of play as Kerry triumphed by 2–7 to 2–4. It was a sixth All-Ireland medal for Barrett, while he also lifted the Sam Maguire Cup for the second time.

In 1933 Kerry set out to make history by becoming the first team to achieve five consecutive All-Ireland titles. All went to plan as Kerry defeated Tipperary by 2–8 to 1–4 to take the Munster title again. It was Barrett's ninth provincial winners' medal. Kerry's dream of creating history came to an abrupt end in the subsequent All-Ireland semi-final as eventual champions Cavan defeated Barrett's side by 1–5 to 0–5. This was his last appearance with Kerry as he retired from inter-county football following this defeat.

Sporting positions
Preceded by John Joe Sheehy	Kerry Senior Football Captain; 1929	Succeeded by John Joe Sheehy
Preceded by Con Brosnan	Kerry Senior Football Captain; 1932	Succeeded by Miko Doyle
Achievements
Preceded by Bill "Squires" Gannon (Kildare)	All-Ireland Senior Football winning captain 1929	Succeeded by John Joe Sheehy (Kerry)
Preceded by Con Brosnan (Kerry)	All-Ireland Senior Football winning captain 1932	Succeeded by Jim Smith (Cavan)
