= Tim Landers (Gaelic footballer) =

Kerry Gaelic footballer

Tim "Roundy" Landers
Personal information
- Native name: Tadhg de Londras (Irish)
- Nickname: Roundy
- Born: 1 November 1910 Tralee, County Kerry, Ireland
- Died: 26 May 1991 (aged 80) Tralee, County Kerry, Ireland
- Occupation: Clerical officer
- Height: 5 ft 8 in (173 cm)

Sport
- Sport: Gaelic football
- Position: Right corner-forward
Clubs
- Years: Club
- Rock Street; Austin Stacks
Club titles
	Football	Hurling
Kerry titles	5	3
Inter-county
Years	County	Apps (scores)
1930–1945	Kerry	20 (8–20)
Inter-county titles
- Munster titles: 8
- All-Irelands: 5
- NFL: 2
- All Stars: 1

Timothy Landers (1 November 1910 – 26 May 1991) was an Irish Gaelic footballer. His league and championship career at senior level for the Kerry county team spanned sixteen seasons from 1930 to 1945.

Raised in Tralee, County Kerry, Landers was one of six children born to the former Catherine Roche and Garrett Landers. He was educated locally and first played competitive hurling and Gaelic football with the Rock Street club, with whom he won three county hurling championship medals, while with the later renamed Austin Stacks club Landers won five county football championship medals.

Landers made his debut on the inter-county scene at the age of fifteen when he was selected for the Kerry junior team, winning All-Ireland medals in that grade in 1928 and 1930. By this stage, he had joined the Kerry senior team, making his debut during the 1930-31 National League. Over the course of the next fifteen years, Landers won five All-Ireland medals, eight Munster medals and two National Football League medals. He played his last game for Kerry in July 1945. Landers's brothers, John Joe and Bill, also enjoyed All-Ireland success with Kerry.

After being chosen for the Munster interprovincial team for the first time in 1931, Landers was an automatic choice on the starting fifteen until 1940. During that time, he won one Railway Cup medal.

In retirement from playing, Landers came to be regarded as one of Kerry's greatest players of all time. In 1985, he and his brother John Joe were jointly presented with the GAA All-Time All Star Award.

Awards
Preceded by John Dunne	GAA All-Time All Star Award; 1985	Succeeded by Alf Murray
