= Bill Landers =

Irish Gaelic footballer

Personal information
- Native name: Liam de Londras (Irish)
- Nickname: Lang
- Born: 26 April 1901 Tralee, County Kerry, Ireland
- Died: 22 December 1958 (aged 57) Killarney, County Kerry, Ireland
- Occupation: Hospital porter

Sport
- Sport: Gaelic football
- Position: Left corner-forward
Clubs
- Years: Club
- Rock Street; Austin Stacks
Club titles
- Kerry titles: 1
Inter-county
- Years: County
- 1923-1933: Kerry
Inter-county titles
- Munster titles: 4
- All-Irelands: 2
- NFL: 1

William John Landers (26 April 1901 – 22 December 1958) was an Irish Gaelic footballer who played at club level with Rock Street and at inter-county level with the Kerry senior football team. He usually lined out as a forward.

== Career ==
Landers enjoyed a successful Gaelic football career and was part of two All-Ireland-winning teams. He was also on the losing side in the 1923 All-Ireland final. Landers's inter-county career was interrupted as a result of his emigration to the United States in 1925. He returned in 1932 and immediately regained his place on the Kerry team, while he also won a County Championship title with Rock Street. Landers captained the Kerry team that toured North America in 1933 and played his last game for the team in an All-Ireland semi-final defeat by Cavan that same year. He also earned selection on the Munster team.

== Personal life and death ==
Landers was one of three brothers, Tim (Roundy) and John Joe (Purty), who between them won 12 All-Ireland medals. He was involved in the War of Independence and took the anti-Treaty side during the Civil War.

Landers died from a heart attack on 22 December 1958.

== Honours ==
Rock Street

- Kerry Senior Football Championship: 1932

Kerry

- All-Ireland Senior Football Championship: 1924, 1932
- Munster Senior Football Championship: 1923, 1924, 1932, 1933
- National Football League: 1931–32
