= Dee O'Connor =

Irish Gaelic footballer

Personal information
- Native name: D. Ó Conchubhair (Irish)
- Born: Kilcummin, County Kerry, Ireland

Sport
- Sport: Gaelic football
- Position: Left corner-back
Clubs
- Years: Club
- Kilcummin; Dr. Crokes
Club titles
- Kerry titles: 0
Inter-county
Years	County	Apps (scores)
1927-1936	Kerry	22 (0-00)
Inter-county titles
- Munster titles: 4
- All-Irelands: 4
- NFL: 3

Dee O'Connor was an Irish Gaelic footballer who played as a left corner-back for the Kerry senior team.
