= Miko Doyle =

Irish hurler and Gaelic footballer

Personal information
- Born: 8 April 1911 Tralee, County Kerry
- Died: 29 September 1980 (aged 69)

Sport
- Sport: Gaelic football
- Position: Half Forward
Club
- Years: Club
- 1920s-1940s: Austin Stacks
Club titles
- Kerry titles: 5 (F) 4 (H)
Inter-county
| Years | County | Apps (scores) |
| 1928-1938 | Kerry | 33 (5-21) |
Inter-county titles
- Munster titles: 10
- All-Irelands: 5
- NFL: 3

Miko Doyle (8 April 1911 – 29 September 1980) was an Irish sportsperson. He played Gaelic football and hurling with his local club Austin Stacks and was Kerry senior inter-county team member from 1929 until 1939.

He won five All Ireland medals with Kerry during his playing days, four of them by age 21. He was captain of the 1937 winning team. He also won three National Football League titles.

At the time Austin Stacks were one of the main teams in Kerry in both football and hurling and Doyle won County Championships with both, five in football and four in hurling. He was captain of the 1936 winning football team.

Sporting positions
| Preceded by Joe Barrett | Kerry Senior Football Captain; 1933 | Succeeded by Dan O'Keeffe |
| Preceded by Dan O'Keeffe | Kerry Senior Football Captain; 1937 | Succeeded by Bill Kinnerk |
Achievements
| Preceded by Seamus O'Malley (Mayo) | All-Ireland Senior Football winning captain 1937 | Succeeded by J. Dunne (Galway) |
