= Tim O'Donnell (Gaelic footballer) =

Irish Gaelic footballer

Personal information
- Native name: Tadhg Ó Domhnaill (Irish)
- Born: 7 March 1907 Camp, County Kerry
- Died: 15 July 2003 (aged 96) Dublin
- Occupation: Garda Síochána
- Height: 5 ft 11 in (180 cm)

Sport
- Sport: Gaelic football
- Position: Right corner-forward
Club
- Years: Club
- 1920s–1940s: Camp
Inter-county
- Years: County
- 1927–1938: Kerry
Inter-county titles
- Munster titles: 6
- All-Irelands: 3
- NFL: 3

Tim O'Donnell (7 March 1907 – 15 July 2003) was an Irish sportsperson, and brother of the legendary John Kerry O’Donnell. He played Gaelic football with his local club Camp and was a member of the Kerry senior inter-county team from 1929 until 1937. The Holder of 3 senior All-Ireland medals won in 1929, 1930 and 1937, sadly he lost out on two more All-Ireland wins in 1931 and 32’ due to a knee injury in 1931. In his last all-Ireland win in 1937, his knee injury that he had suffered with for so long resurfaced and he had to retire. In total he won three senior All-Ireland medals, three National leagues, five Munster championships and a Railway Cup Medal. He had a very successful career, creating a never ending love for Gaelic football for his family. At the time of his death, O'Donnell was Kerry's oldest surviving All-Ireland medal winner. He died at the age of 96 in a Dublin hospital.
