= 1940 All-Ireland Senior Football Championship =

Football championship

All-Ireland Champions
- Winning team: Kerry (14th win)
- Captain: Seán Brosnan

All-Ireland Finalists
- Losing team: Galway
- Captain: John "Tull" Dunne

Provincial Champions
- Munster: Kerry
- Leinster: Meath
- Ulster: Cavan
- Connacht: Galway

Championship statistics

The 1940 All-Ireland Senior Football Championship was the 54th staging of Ireland's premier Gaelic football knock-out competition. Kerry won their fourteenth All-Ireland title, putting them level with Dublin in the all-time standings.

== Format ==
=== Provincial Championships format changes ===
==== Leinster Championship format change ====
A reduced amount of counties in the championship of 1940.

==== Munster Championship format change ====
There is normal format of 2 Quarter-finals vs 2 Semi-finals in place. Limerick played final match until 1943 took a 2-year break.

=== All Ireland semi-finals system ===
The All-Ireland Senior Football Championship was run on a provincial basis as usual in rotation of every 3rd year, with the four winners from Connacht, Leinster, Munster and Ulster advancing to the All-Ireland semi-finals. The draw for these games was as follows:

- Munster V. Ulster
- Connacht V. Leinster

== Results ==
=== Connacht Senior Football Championship ===
30 June 1940
Semi-Final

Sligo	2–4 – 1–7	Mayo
		M O’Malley (1–0) & T Hoban (0–4, one free).

Sligo

14 July 1940
Semi-Final Replay

Sligo	0–7 – 3–2	Mayo
		G Ormsby (0–2), P Moclair (2–0) & sub J Laffey (1–0).

Sligo

21 July 1940
Final

Galway	1–7 – 0–5	Mayo
		G Ormsby (0–1), P Laffey (0–1) & M O’Malley (0–3).

St. Coman's Park, Roscommon

=== Leinster Senior Football Championship ===
5 May 1940
Preliminary Round

Laois	1–7 – 1–6	Carlow

Geraldine Park, Athy

19 May 1940
Preliminary Round

Offaly	1–13 – 1–5	Wicklow

Naas
Referee: G Higgins

12 May 1940
Quarter-Final

Meath	3-11– 1–7	Longford

Cusack Park, Mullingar

19 May 1940
Quarter-Final

Dublin	1-9– 2–5	Louth

Páirc Tailteann, Navan

2 June 1940
Quarter-Final

Laois	3-4– 0–4	Wexford

Dr. Cullen Park, Carlow

23 June 1940
Quarter-Final

Offaly	2–6 – 0–8	Kildare
		A.O'Leary 0–3, R.Martin 0–2, T.Mulhall, B.Dunne, T.Dalton 0–1.

O'Moore Park, Portlaoise

7 July 1940
Semi-Final

Meath	1–7 – 0–4	Dublin

St. Conleth's Park, Newbridge

14 July 1940
Semi-Final

Offaly	0–7 – 2–7	Laois

Geraldine Park, Athy
Referee: T Kehoe (Wexford)

28 July 1940
Final

Meath	2–7 – 1–7	Laois
Jackie Maye 2–0, Kevin Devin 0-4f, Tony Donnelly 0–2, Peter McDermott 0–1		Chris Delaney 0–5 (0-3f) and Danny Douglas 1–2

Croke Park, Dublin
Attendance: 19,803
Referee: Dave Hamilton (Dublin)

=== Munster Senior Football Championship ===
19 May 1940
Quarter-Final

Kerry	4–9 – 1–2	Limerick
Tom Gega O'Connor (0–1), Jimmy Gawksie O'Gorman (1–1), Murt Kelly (0–1), Tony McAuliffe (1–1), Dan Spring (1–3) & Jimmy O'Gorman (1–2).

Páirc Uí Chathaláin, Glin

19 May 1940
Quarter-Final

Tipperary	2–7 – 1–5	Cork
		R. Harmody (0–3), J. Young (1–1) & L. O’Sullivan (0–1).

Mitchelstown
Referee: P. McKenna (Limerick)

19 May 1940
Semi-Final

Clare	1–6 – 2–3	Waterford

The Cricket Field, Kilrush

30 June 1940
Semi-Final

Kerry	4–8 – 1–5	Tipperary
Johnny Walsh (0–1), Murt Kelly (0–2), Dan Spring (2–2), Jimmy Gawksie O'Gorman (2–1) & Sub: Jim Bawn Fitzgerald (0–2) for Jack Walsh.

Cork Athletic Grounds, Cork
Referee: S. Murphy ( C )

30 June 1940
Semi-Final Replay

Clare	1–3 – 2–5	Waterford

Fraher Field, Dungarvan

21 July 1940
Final

Kerry	1–10 – 0–6	Waterford
Tom Gega O'Connor (0–2), Sean Brosnan (1–2), Murt Kelly (0–2) & Dan Spring (0–2).

Walsh Park, Waterford

=== Ulster Senior Football Championship ===
23 June 1940
Quarter-Final

Antrim	3–3 – 0–12	Cavan

Corrigan Park, Belfast

23 June 1940
Quarter-Final

Donegal	0–6 – 0–5	Armagh

Athletic Grounds, Armagh

30 June 1940
Quarter-Final

Down	3–8 – 2–5	Tyrone

St. Patrick's Park, Newcastle

7 July 1940
Quarter-Final Replay

Antrim	0–4 – 6–13	Cavan

Breffni Park, Cavan

14 July 1940
Semi-Final

Cavan	0–12 – 2–3	Donegal

Bundoran
Attendance: 3,000

14 July 1940
Semi-Final

Monaghan	2–3 – 2–3	Down

St. Mary's Park, Castleblayney

21 July 1940
Semi-Final Replay

Monaghan	1–3 – 0–8	Down

St. Patrick's Park, Newcastle

28 July 1940
Final

Cavan	4–10 – 1–5	Down

Breffni Park, Cavan

=== All-Ireland Senior Football Championship ===
18 August 1940
Semi-Final

Galway	3–8 – 2–5	Meath

Croke Park, Dublin

18 August 1940
Semi-Final

Kerry	3–4 – 0–8	Cavan
Tom Gega O'Connor (0–1), Johnny Walsh (1–1) & Sean Brosnan (0–1).

Croke Park, Dublin

22 September 1940
Final

Kerry	0–7 – 1–3	Galway
Tom Gega O'Connor (0–1), Murt Kelly (0–2), Dan Spring (0–1), Charlie O'Sullivan (0–2) & Sub, Paddy Bawn Brosnan (0–1) for Dan Spring.		J. Duggan (1–0), B. Nestor, J. Dunne & J. Burke (0–1) each.

Croke Park, Dublin
Attendance: 60,821
Referee: Seamus Burke, (Kildare)

== Championship statistics ==
=== Miscellaneous ===
- Meath retain the Leinster title for the first time in history.
- The All Ireland semi-final between Galway and Meath was their first championship meeting.
- Kerry are now level with Dublin for the most All Ireland titles.
