= 1929 All-Ireland Senior Football Championship =

Football championship

All-Ireland Champions
- Winning team: Kerry (8th win)
- Captain: Joe Barrett

All-Ireland Finalists
- Losing team: Kildare
- Captain: Jack Higgins

Provincial Champions
- Munster: Kerry
- Leinster: Kildare
- Ulster: Monaghan
- Connacht: Mayo

Championship statistics

The 1929 All-Ireland Senior Football Championship was the 43rd staging of Ireland's premier Gaelic football knock-out competition. Kerry were the winners. Starting their 1st 4 in a row stopped Kildare's bid for 3rd in a row.

== Results ==
=== Connacht Senior Football Championship ===
16 June 1929
Quarter-Final

Leitrim	0–6 – 1–4	Sligo

Boyle
Attendance: 2,000

9 June 1929
Semi-Final

Mayo	6–6 – 0–4	Roscommon
M Barrett (0–2), G Courell (2–1).

Castlerea

7 July 1929
Semi-Final

Sligo	0–0 – 1–7	Galway

Roscommon
Attendance: 3,000

21 July 1929
Final

Mayo	1–6 – 0–4	Galway
J Kenny (1–0), G Courell (0–6).

Roscommon
Attendance: 5,000

=== Leinster Senior Football Championship ===
May 1929
Quarter-Final

Wexford	0–7 – 3–3	Laois

Kilkenny

12 May 1929
Quarter-Final

Kildare	1–5 – 0–8	Meath
P.Martin 1–0, P.Doyle 0–3, P.Ryan, J.Higgins 0–1.

Drogheda Park, Drogheda

26 May 1929
Quarter-Final

Dublin	3–7 – 1–6	Longford

Mullingar

26 May 1929
Quarter-Final

Kilkenny	0–10 – 0–4	Louth

Croke Park, Dublin
Referee: Sean O'Connor

9 June 1929
Quarter-Final Replay

Kildare	3–5 – 0–9	Meath
A.O'Neill 2–1, P.Martin 1–2, P.Doyle 0–2.

Drogheda Park, Drogheda

30 June 1929
Semi-Final

Laois	5–5 – 3–10	Dublin

Geraldine Park, Athy

7 July 1929
Semi-Final

Kildare	2–11 – 0–3	Kilkenny
A.O'Neill 1–1, P.Martin 0–4, J.Higgins 1–0, P.Pringle 0–3, P.Loughlin, P.Doyle, J.Loughlin 0–1.

O'Moore Park, Portlaoise

21 July 1929
Final

Kildare	2–3 – 0–6	Laois
P.Pringle 2–2, P.Loughlin 0–2, W.Gannon 0–1.

Croke Park, Dublin

=== Munster Senior Football Championship ===
26 May 1929
Semi Final

Cork	1–3 – 1–7	Kerry
		J J Landers 1–0, S Locke 0–3, B Stack 0–2, J Stack 0–1 each

Cork Athletic Grounds, Cork

26 May 1929
Semi Final

Tipperary	1–4 – 3–3	Clare

The Cricket Field, Kilrush
Referee: S.Malone (Clare)

14 July 1929
Final

Kerry	1–14 – 1–2	Clare
J Clifford 1–1, N Sweeney, J J Sheehy, J Ryan 0–3 each, S Locke 0–2, J J Landers, M Doyle 0–1 each

Killarney

=== Ulster Senior Football Championship ===
19 May 1929
Quarter-Final

Armagh	5–4 – 3–2	Down

The Marshes, Newry

19 May 1929
Quarter-Final

Tyrone	0–8 – 0–2	Fermanagh

Brewster Park, Enniskillen

26 May 1929
Quarter-Final

Cavan	1–11 – 0–2	Fermanagh

Belfast

2 June 1929
Quarter-Final

Monaghan	2–8 – 0–1	Donegal

Bundoran

16 June 1929
Semi-Final

Tyrone	1–2 – 3–7	Monaghan

Monaghan

30 June 1929
Semi-Final

Cavan	4–10 – 0–2	Armagh

Belturbet
Attendance: 8,000

28 July 1929
Final

Monaghan	1–4 – 1–4	Cavan

Breffni Park, Cavan
Attendance: 10,000

11 August 1929
Final Replay

Monaghan	1–10 – 0–7	Cavan

Carrickmacross

=== All-Ireland Senior Football Championship ===
18 August 1929
Semi-Final

Kerry	3–8 – 1–1	Mayo
M Doyle 1–4, J J Sheehy 1–1, M Ó'Ruairc 1–0, J Ryan 0–2, P Russell 0–1		F Patten (0–1), M Barrett (1–0).

Roscommon

25 August 1929
Semi-Final

Kildare	0–9 – 0–1	Monaghan
T.Wheeler, P.Pringle, P.Martin 0–2, P.Loughlin, J.Higgins, P.Doyle 0–1.

Croke Park, Dublin

22 September 1929
Final

Kerry	1–8 – 1–5	Kildare
J J Sheehy 0–6, N Sweeney 1–0, J Ryan, J J Landers 0–1 each		P.Doyle 0–5, P.Martin 1–0.

Croke Park, Dublin
Attendance: 43,839
Referee: Tom Burke (Louth)

== Championship statistics ==
=== Miscellaneous ===
- Kilkenny vs Louth game remains Kilkenny's last winning game in the Leinster championship.
- The All Ireland semi-final between Kildare and Monaghan was the first meeting between the teams.
- Kerry won all their League games (7-0) and all their Championship games (4-0). In other words, they had a perfect season. As of 2026, there have only been 2 perfect seasons: 1929 Kerry and 1932 Kerry.
