= 1930 All-Ireland Senior Football Championship =

Football championship

All-Ireland Champions
- Winning team: Kerry (9th win)
- Captain: John Joe Sheehy

All-Ireland Finalists
- Losing team: Monaghan
- Captain: Paddy Kilroy

Provincial Champions
- Munster: Kerry
- Leinster: Kildare
- Ulster: Monaghan
- Connacht: Mayo

Championship statistics

The 1930 All-Ireland Senior Football Championship was the 44th staging of Ireland's premier Gaelic football knock-out competition. Kerry was the winner of the competition.

== Results ==
=== Connacht Senior Football Championship ===
18 May 1930
Quarter-Final

Mayo	2–4 – 1–1	Leitrim
D Hearns (1–0), P Moclair (1–0), G Courell (1–0).

Sligo

29 June 1930
Semi-Final

Sligo	2–7 – 0–5	Roscommon

Boyle

29 June 1930
Semi-Final

Galway	0–7 – 0–1	Mayo

Boyle
Attendance: 4,000

An objection was made and Mayo was awarded the win.

10 August 1930
Final

Mayo	1–7 – 1–2	Sligo
M Keating (0–2), M Moran (1–1); D Hearns (0–1), G Courell (0–3, frees).

Tuam
Attendance: 7,000

=== Leinster Senior Football Championship ===
1930
Preliminary Round

Louth	0–3 – 2–7	Westmeath

Croke Park, Dublin

1930
Preliminary Round

Dublin	2–8 – 0–4	Westmeath

Mullingar

1930
Preliminary Round

Meath	1–12 – 1–5	Longford

Mullingar

1930
Preliminary Round

Wexford	4–2 – 2–1	Kilkenny

Barrett's Park, New Ross

11 May 1930
Preliminary Round

Kildare	6–7 – 3–3	Offaly
M.Behan 3–1, J.Higgins 2–3, P.Carroll 1–1, J.Maguire 0–2.

Ballyduff Park, Tullamore

Although Kildare won the match, Offaly still played against a Semi-final against Carlow.

June 1930
Quarter Final

Laois	2–3 – 1–0	Carlow

Geraldine Park, Athy

29 June 1930
Quarter Final

Meath	3–8 – 0–4	Dublin

Drogheda Park, Drogheda
Attendance: 17,000

6 July 1930
Quarter Final

Kildare	2–11 – 0–7	Wexford
P.Martin 1–2, P.Loughlin 1–0, P.Doyle, P.Byrne 0–3, P.Ryan 0–2, H.Burke 0–1.

Croke Park, Dublin

13 July 1930
Semi Final

Offaly	1–4 – 0–9	Carlow

Geraldine Park, Athy
Referee: J Delaney

20 July 1930
Semi Final

Kildare	4–4 – 1–4	Laois
H.Burke 3–1, P.Byrne 1–0, P.Doyle, P.Ryan, P.Loughlin 0–1.

Nowlan Park, Kilkenny

10 August 1930
Final

Kildare	0–6 – 1–3	Meath
P.Doyle 0–4, P.Burke, P.Byrne 0–1.

Croke Park, Dublin

17 August 1930
Final Replay

Kildare	2–6 – 1–2	Meath
L.Stanley 1–2, J.Higgins 1–0, P.Doyle 0–3, P.Martin 0–1.

Croke Park, Dublin

=== Munster Senior Football Championship ===
1 June 1930
Quarter-Final

Cork	3–8 – 0–4	Clare
M. Murphy (0–1), M. Walsh (1–0), P. Walsh & J. O'Reagan (0–1) each.

Cork Athletic Grounds, Cork

20 July 1930
Semi-Final

Tipperary	2–6 – 1–3	Cork
		M. Donegan (0–2), JJ Horgan (1–0), P. Coughlan (1–3), J. O'Reagan (1–1) & J. Ryan (0–2).

Clonmel
Referee: P. Whelan (W)

10 August 1930
Final

Kerry	3–4 – 1–2	Tipperary
J J Sheehy 1–2, J Ryan 1–1, C Brosnan 1–0, E Fitzgerald 0–1

Tipperary
Referee: S. Hogan (W)

=== Ulster Senior Football Championship ===
25 May 1930
Quarter-Final

Armagh	2–3 – 2–3	Tyrone

Dungannon

There was not time for a replay so Armagh advanced.

1 June 1930
Quarter-Final

Antrim	3–3 – 2–5	Fermanagh

Brewster Park, Enniskillen

Fermanagh objected and was allowed another quarter-final, against Cavan.

8 June 1930
Quarter-Final

Monaghan	7–8 – 1–3	Down

Pairc Esler, Newry

22 June 1930
Quarter-Final

Cavan	2–3 – 1–0	Fermanagh

Belturbet

29 June 1930
Semi-Final

Armagh	0–5 – 2–2	Monaghan

Athletic Grounds, Armagh

6 July 1930
Semi-Final

Cavan	1–5 – 1–2	Armagh

Corrigan Park, Belfast

27 July 1930
Final

Monaghan	4–3 – 1–5	Cavan

Carrickmacross

=== All-Ireland Senior Football Championship ===
24 August 1930
Semi-Final

Monaghan	1–6 – 1–4	Kildare
		P.Burke 1–1, H.Burke, P.Ryan, P.Doyle 0–1.

Croke Park, Dublin

24 August 1930
Semi-Final

Kerry	1–9 – 1–4	Mayo
J J Sheehy 1–5, M Ó'Ruairc, T O'Donnell, B Stack, J Ryan 0–1 each.		G Courell (0–2), D Hearns (0–1), M Moran (0–1).

Roscommon

28 September 1930
Final

Kerry	3–11 – 0–2	Monaghan
J J Landers 2–3, N Sweeney 1–0, J J Sheehy, J Ryan 0–3 each, M Doyle 0–2.

Croke Park, Dublin
Attendance: 33,280
Referee: Jim Byrne (Wexford)

== Championship statistics ==
=== Miscellaneous ===
- The Armagh-Tyrone game ended in a draw but didn't go to a replay. Armagh decided to go straight to Ulster semi-final.
- Monaghan reached the All Ireland final for the first time ever but was beaten by Kerry.
