= 1926 All-Ireland Senior Football Championship =

Football championship

All-Ireland Champions
- Winning team: Kerry (7th win)
- Captain: Con Brosnan; John Joe Sheehy

All-Ireland Finalists
- Losing team: Kildare

Provincial Champions
- Munster: Kerry
- Leinster: Kildare
- Ulster: Cavan
- Connacht: Galway

Championship statistics

The 1926 All-Ireland Senior Football Championship was the 40th staging of Ireland's premier Gaelic football knock-out competition. The All Ireland semi final between Kildare ended Galway's All Ireland title. Kerry were the winners.

== Results ==
=== Connacht ===
Connacht Senior Football Championship

30 May 1926
Quarter-Final

Sligo	1–3 – 2–6	Mayo
		F Doherty (1–1), F Patten (1–0) & JE McEllin (0–2).

Castlerea

2 May 1926
Semi-Final

Galway	2–2 – 1–1	Roscommon

Roscommon

13 June 1926
Semi-Final

Mayo	2–3 – 0–2	Leitrim
JE McEllin (1–0), J White (0–1) & M Mullins (0–1).

Sligo

11 July 1926
Final

Galway	3–2 – 1–2	Mayo
		J Forde (0–2).

Roscommon
Attendance: 8,000

=== Leinster ===
Leinster Senior Football Championship

9 May 1926
Preliminary Round

Laois	2–8 – 0–4	Carlow

Tullow

11 April 1926
Preliminary Round

Kilkenny	2–5 – 1–5	Longford

Birr
Referee: Jack Delaney

16 May 1926
Preliminary Round

Wexford	0–7 – 0–3	Meath

Croke Park, Dublin
Referee: T. Burke (Louth)

23 May 1926
Quarter-Final

Kildare	6–7 – 1–5	Louth

Croke Park, Dublin
Referee: T McDonnell (Dublin)

20 June 1926
Quarter-Final

Wexford	0–4 – 0–1	Kilkenny

Barrett's Park, New Ross
Attendance: 3000
Referee: Sean O'Neill (Dublin)

20 June 1926
Semi-Final

Kildare	0–6 – 1–3	Dublin

Ballyduff Park, Tullamore

4 July 1926
Semi-Final Replay

Kildare	2–5 – 1–2	Dublin

O'Moore Park, Portlaoise

18 July 1926
Semi-Final

Wexford	2–6 – 1–2	Laois

St. James Park, Kilkenny

1 August 1926
Final

Kildare	2–8 – 1–5	Wexford
Larry Stanley 1–3 (0-2f), Bill Gannon 1–0, Paul Doyle and Joe Curtis 0–2 each, Albert O'Neill 0–1		Paddy O'Connor 1–0, Paddy Kilroy 0-2f, Pat Bailey, Martin O'Neill, Jack Fane 0–1 each

Croke Park, Dublin
Referee: Tom Burke (Louth)

=== Munster ===
Munster Senior Football Championship

9 May 1926
Quarter-Final

Kerry	0–6 – 1–1	Clare
Phil O'Sullivan (0–1), Jackie Ryan (0–1) & John Joe Sheehy (0–4).

Milltown Malbay

27 June 1926
Quarter-Final

Cork	1–6 – 1–1	Waterford

Cork Athletic Grounds, Cork

23 May 1926
Semi-Final

Tipperary	6–5 – 6–5	Limerick

Páirc Daibhín, Carrick on Suir
Referee: S. Hogan (W)

There was not time for a replay, so Tipperary advanced.

18 July 1926
Semi-Final

Kerry	1–9 – 2–1	Cork
Joe Barrett (0–1), Tom O'Mahony (0–2), Pat Farren(1–1) & Jackie Ryan (0–4).

Listowel

25 July 1926
Final

Kerry	0–11 – 1–4	Tipperary
Jackie Ryan (0–2), Tom O'Mahony (0–1) & John Joe Sheehy (0–7).

Cork Athletic Grounds, Cork
Referee: S. Hogan (W)

=== Ulster ===
Ulster Senior Football Championship

9 May 1926
Preliminary Round

Tyrone	3–8 – 2–1	Fermanagh

Omagh

9 May 1926
Quarter-Final

Antrim	3–6 – 1–8	Armagh

Camlough

16 May 1926
Quarter-Final

Monaghan	0–4 – 0–1	Down

Hilltown

16 May 1926
Quarter-Final

Cavan	4–7 – 1–5	Donegal

Cavan

6 June 1926
Quarter-Final

Tyrone	3–3 – 2–1	Derry

Dungannon

27 June 1926
Semi-Final

Cavan	0–7 – 0–7	Monaghan

Belturbet

5 July 1926
Semi-Final

Antrim	2–5 – 0–3	Tyrone

Omagh

1 August 1926
Semi-Final Replay

Cavan	0–7 – 1–3	Monaghan

Ballybay

22 August 1926
Final

Cavan	5–3 – 0–6	Antrim

Cavan
Attendance: 2,000

=== Semi-finals ===
8 August 1926
Semi-Final

Kerry	1–6 – 0–1	Cavan
John Joe Sheehy (0–1), Tom O'Mahony (0–1) & Jackie Ryan (1–4).

Croke Park, Dublin

22 August 1926
Semi-Final

Kildare	2–5 – 0–2	Galway

Croke Park, Dublin

=== Final ===
5 September 1926
Final

Kerry	1–3 – 0–6	Kildare
John Joe Sheehy (0–1), Jackie Ryan (0–1) & Bill O'Gorman (1–1).

Croke Park, Dublin
Attendance: 37,500
Referee: T Shevlin (Roscommon)

17 October 1926
Final Replay

Kerry	1–4 – 0–4	Kildare
Paul Russell (0–1), Jackie Ryan (0–1), Tom O'Mahony (1–1) & Bill O'Gorman (0–1).

Croke Park, Dublin
Attendance: 35,500
Referee: T Shevlin (Roscommon)

== Statistics ==
=== Miscellaneous ===
- The Limerick vs Tipperary game ended in a draw but didn't go to a replay. Tipperary decided to qualify for Munster final.
