= 1931 All-Ireland Senior Football Championship =

Football championship

All-Ireland Champions
- Winning team: Kerry (10th win)
- Captain: Con Brosnan

All-Ireland Finalists
- Losing team: Kildare
- Captain: Mick Walsh

Provincial Champions
- Munster: Kerry
- Leinster: Kildare
- Ulster: Cavan
- Connacht: Mayo

Championship statistics

The 1931 All-Ireland Senior Football Championship was the 45th staging of Ireland's premier Gaelic football knock-out competition. Kerry were the winners.

== Results ==
=== Connacht Senior Football Championship ===
31 May 1931
Quarter-Final

Mayo	1–8 – 1–3	Sligo
J Culkin (0–4) & G Courell (1–3).

Tuam

24 May 1931
Semi-Final

Roscommon	5–6 – 0–1	Leitrim

Boyle

5 July 1931
Semi-Final

Mayo	3–5 – 1–4	Galway
J Culkin (1–2), G Courell (1–1), P Moclair (1–2).

Castlerea
Attendance: 6,000

9 August 1931
Final

Mayo	2–10 – 3–2	Roscommon
S O’Malley (0–1), J Forde (0–1), S O’Dwyer (0–1), M Moran (0–1); G Courell (2–3) & J Culkin (0–3).

Sligo
Attendance: 6,000

=== Leinster Senior Football Championship ===
1931
Preliminary Round

Louth	2–2 – 1–3	Meath

Dundalk

1931
Quarter-Final

Louth	1–5 – 5–6	Dublin

Drogheda Park, Drogheda

17 May 1931
Quarter-Final

Westmeath	8–5 – 1–5	Kilkenny

Ballyduff Park, Tullamore

31 May 1931
Quarter-Final

Kildare	2–4 – 1–6	Laois
J.P.Murphy 1–1, P.Loughlin 1–0, F.Malone, H.Burke, J.Higgins 0–1.

O'Moore Park, Portlaoise

7 June 1931
Quarter-Final

Meath	2–1 – 1–1	Offaly

Navan
Referee: T Burke (Louth)

28 June 1931
Quarter-Final Replay

Meath	0–8 – 0–3	Offaly

Navan
Referee: A Rogers

19 July 1931
Semi-Final

Kildare	1–4 – 1–4	Meath
M.Mahon 1–0, P.Martin 0–2, P.Byrne, J.Higgins 0–1.

Croke Park, Dublin

26 July 1931
Semi-Final

Westmeath	2–4 – 1–4	Dublin

Ballyduff Park, Tullamore

2 August 1931
Semi Final Replay

Kildare	1–5 – 0–5	Meath
P.Doyle 1–2, P.Pringle, P.Waters 0–1.

Croke Park, Dublin

9 August 1931
Final

Kildare	2–9 – 1–6	Westmeath
Paul Doyle 1–5 (1-4f), Peter Pringle 1–0, Peter Waters, M Mahon, Paddy Martin, Dermot Bourke 0–1 each		Paddy Doyle 1-2f, Jack Smith 0–2, Jim Byrne (0-1f) and Paddy Bracken 0–1 each

Croke Park, Dublin
Attendance: 9,300
Referee: J. Donoghue (Wexford)

=== Munster Senior Football Championship ===
7 June 1931
Preliminary Round

Tipperary	4–4 – 0–1	Limerick

Newcastlewest
Referee: P. McNamara (Clare)

14 June 1931
Quarter-Final

Cork	3–4 – 1–2	Clare
M. Jackson (0–3), J. O'Regan (2–0) & J. Murphy (1–0).

The Mardyke, Cork

21 June 1931
Quarter-Final

Tipperary	0–7 – 0–0	Waterford

Fraher Field, Dungarvan
Referee: T. Keating (Tipperary)

5 July 1931
Semi-Final

Cork	3–1 – 2–11	Tipperary
J. Murphy & J. Warren (1–0).

Ned Hall Park, Clonmel
Referee: P. Whelan (W)

9 August 1931
Final

Kerry	5–8 – 0–2	Tipperary
Tim Landers (1–0), Jackie Ryan (1–0) & Martin Regan (3–0).

Tralee
Referee: S. Malone (Clare)

=== Ulster Senior Football Championship ===
10 May 1931
Quarter-Final

Donegal	2–4 – 0–1	Antrim

Letterkenny
Attendance: 1,000

An objection was made and the game awarded to Antrim.

17 May 1931
Quarter-Final

Monaghan	3–8 – 1–4	Tyrone

Dungannon

24 May 1931
Quarter-Final

Armagh	0–6 – 0–2	Down

The Marshes, Newry

14 June 1931
Quarter-Final

Cavan	2–5 – 1–2	Fermanagh

Belturbet

21 June 1931
Semi-Final

Armagh	1–9 – 0–4	Monaghan

Carrickmacross
Attendance: 4,000

5 July 1931
Semi-Final

Cavan	4–9 – 2–3	Antrim

Corrigan Park, Belfast

2 August 1931
Final

Cavan	0–8 – 2–1	Armagh

Dundalk

=== All-Ireland Senior Football Championship ===
30 August 1931
Semi-Final

Kerry	1–6 – 1–4	Mayo
J Ryan 1–1, P Whitty 0–3, B Stack, M Doyle 0–1 each		S O’Dwyer (0–1), G Courell (0–2) & J Culkin (1–0).

Tuam

30 August 1931
Semi-Final

Kildare	0–10 – 1–5	Cavan
P.Doyle 0–4, P.Byrne 0–3, P.Martin 0–2, P.Pringle 0–1.

Breffni Park, Cavan

27 September 1931
Final

Kerry	1–11 – 0–8	Kildare
J Ryan 0–6, P Russell 1–0, P Whitty, J J Landers 0–2 each, M Doyle 0–1.	Report	P.Byrne, H.Burke 0–3, D.Bourke, P.Martin 0–1.

Croke Park, Dublin
Attendance: 42,350
Referee: T. Keating (Tipperary)

== Championship statistics ==
=== Miscellaneous ===
- Castlebar's pitch becomes known as McHale after John MacHale.
- Kilkenny withdraw from Leinster Championship until 1943.
- Westmeath beat Dublin for the first time ever.
- Kerry become the first Munster team to be All Ireland champions for 3 years in a row.
