= Paul Russell (Gaelic footballer) =

Irish Gaelic footballer

Personal information
- Native name: Pól Ruiséil (Irish)
- Born: 1906 Killarney, County Kerry
- Died: 1965 (aged 58–59)
- Occupation: Garda Síochána

Sport
- Sport: Gaelic football
- Position: Right wing-back
Club
- Years: Club
- 1920s-1930s: Dr. Crokes
Inter-county
- Years: County
- 1924-1933: Kerry
Inter-county titles
- Munster titles: 7
- All-Irelands: 6
- NFL: 3

Paul Russell (2 July 1906 – June 1965) was an Irish sportsperson. He played Gaelic football with his local club Dr. Crokes and was a member of the Kerry senior inter-county team from 1924 until 1933.

In a senior inter-county career that lasted a decade, Russell won every honour in the game at senior level. The youngest player to win an All-Ireland medal, he was only seventeen when he captured his first Celtic cross in 1924. He went on to add five more All-Ireland titles to his collection. Russell also won seven Munster medals, three National Football League medals and three Railway Cup medals with Munster. He also played for Ireland in the Tailteann Games in 1928 and 1932.

In retirement from play Russell trained the Meath and Waterford senior football teams. In the 1960s he became a respected sports journalist.
