= 1932 All-Ireland Senior Football Championship =

Football championship

All-Ireland Champions
- Winning team: Kerry (11th win)
- Captain: Joe Barrett

All-Ireland Finalists
- Losing team: Mayo

Provincial Champions
- Munster: Kerry
- Leinster: Dublin
- Ulster: Cavan
- Connacht: Mayo

Championship statistics

The 1932 All-Ireland Senior Football Championship was the 46th staging of Ireland's premier Gaelic football knock-out competition. Kerry were the winners for the fourth year in a row.

== Results ==
=== Connacht Senior Football Championship ===
22 May 1932
Quarter-Final

| Sligo | 1–7 – 0–3 | Leitrim |

Carrick-on-Shannon
Attendance: 3,000

29 May 1932
Semi-Final

| Galway | 4–7 – 0–2 | Roscommon |

Castlerea
Attendance: 4,000

17 July 1932
Semi-Final

| Mayo | 3–5 – 1–3 | Galway |
|---|---|---|
| J Forde (1–0), G Courell (1–2), P Moclair (0–2). |

Castlerea
Attendance: 11,000

7 August 1932
Final

| Mayo | 2–6 – 0–7 | Sligo |
|---|---|---|
| G Courell (1–5), P Moclair (1–1). |

Tuam
Attendance: 12,000

=== Leinster Senior Football Championship ===
1932
Preliminary Round

| Dublin | 3–6 – 0–4 | Meath |

St. Conleth's Park, Newbridge

1 May 1932
Preliminary Round

| Kildare | 4–5 – 0–7 | Louth |
|---|---|---|
| D.Bourke 3–1, L.Stanley 1–1, C.Higgins, P.Byrne, J.Higgins 0–1. |

Navan

22 May 1932
Quarter-Final

| Westmeath | 3–5 – 0–4 | Offaly |

Ballyduff Park, Tullamore
Referee: JV Kelly (Longford)

22 May 1932
Quarter-Final

| Wexford | 5–4 – 0–8 | Laois |

Nowlan Park, Kilkenny

29 May 1932
Quarter-Final

| Dublin | 3–6 – 0–4 | Offaly |

St. Conleth's Park, Newbridge

5 June 1932
Semi-Final

| Wexford | 2–8 – 2–5 | Kildare |
|---|---|---|
| | | P.Martin snr, W.Roche (og) 1–0, J.Higgins 0–2, P.Martin jnr, D.Bourke, P.Byrne 0–1. |

Croke Park, Dublin

17 July 1932
Semi-Final

| Dublin | 3–7 – 2–5 | Westmeath |

Ballyduff Park, Tullamore

7 August 1932
Final

| Dublin | 0–8 – 1–5 | Wexford |

Croke Park, Dublin

14 August 1932
Final Replay

| Dublin | 4–6 – 1–5 | Wexford |
|---|---|---|
| Peter Synnott 2–0, T O'Dowd 1–0 and Paddy McDonnell 1–0 each, Billy Dowling 0–3, Ned McCann (0-1f), T Duffy, Murt Kelly (0-1f) 0–1 each | | Paddy Mythen 1–0, Mick Brosnan 0–2, Davy Morris (0-1f), Paddy Spillane, Martin O'Neill 0–1 each |

Croke Park, Dublin
Attendance: 10,500
Referee: Tom Burke (Louth)

=== Munster Senior Football Championship ===
15 May 1932
Quarter-Final

| Clare | 3–5 – 1–6 | Cork |
|---|---|---|
| | | D. O'Keefe (0–4) & T. Browne (0–1). |

Tralee

15 May 1932
Quarter-Final

| Tipperary | 2–4 – 1–4 | Waterford |

Ned Hall Park, Clonmel
Referee: J. Beckett ( C )

22 May 1932
Semi-Final

| Kerry | 1–11 – 1–3 | Limerick |
|---|---|---|
| Con Geaney (0–1), John Joe Landers (0–3), Jack Flavin (0–4), Martin Regan (1–2) & Tim Hayes (0–1). |

Newcastlewest

24 July 1932
Semi-Final

| Tipperary | 0–9 – 0–4 | Clare |

Gaelic Grounds, Limerick
Referee: W. Hough (L)

7 August 1932
Final

| Kerry | 3–10 – 1–4 | Tipperary |
|---|---|---|
| John Joe Landers (0–1), Martin Regan (2–4), Jackie Ryan (0–4) & Con Brosnan (0–1). |

Carrick-on-Suir
Referee: S. Hogan (W)

=== Ulster Senior Football Championship ===
10 April 1932
Quarter-Final

| Armagh | 1–5 – 1–4 | Tyrone |

Letterkenny
Attendance: 1,000

17 April 1932
Quarter-Final

| Monaghan | 1–7 – 1–3 | Fermanagh |

Monaghan

17 April 1932
Quarter-Final

| Antrim | 4–10 – 0–1 | Down |

Corrigan Park, Belfast

24 April 1932
Quarter-Final

| Cavan | 8–7 – 1–6 | Donegal |

Breffni Park, Cavan

8 May 1932
Semi-Final

| Armagh | 2–6 – 0–6 | Antrim |

Corrigan Park, Belfast

29 May 1932
Semi-Final

| Cavan | 8–8 – 2–6 | Monaghan |

Belturbet

19 June 1932
Final

| Cavan | 2–9 – 0–2 | Armagh |

Monaghan
Attendance: 11,000

=== All-Ireland Senior Football Championship ===
21 August 1932
Semi-Final

| Kerry | 1–3 – 1–1 | Dublin |
|---|---|---|
| Paul Russell (1–0), John Joe Landers (0–1), Martin Regan (0–1) & Jackie Ryan (0–1). |

Croke Park, Dublin

21 August 1932
Semi-Final

| Mayo | 2–4 – 0–8 | Cavan |
|---|---|---|
| H Kenny (0–1), G Courell (0–3, two frees), P Moclair (2–0). |

Croke Park, Dublin

25 September 1932
Final

| Kerry | 2–7 – 2–4 | Mayo |
|---|---|---|
| Miko Doyle (1–1), Tim Landers (1–1), Jackie Ryan (0–4) & Con Brosnan (0–1). | | P Munnelly (1–1), G Courell (1–1), P Moclair (0–2). |

Croke Park, Dublin
Attendance: 25,816
Referee: Martin O'Neill (Wexford)

== Championship statistics ==
=== Miscellaneous ===
- Kerry equals Wexford (1915–1918) by becoming All Ireland champions for the 4th year in a row.
- Kerry won all their League games (5-0) and all their Championship games (4-0). In other words, they had a perfect season. As of 2026, there have only been 2 perfect seasons: 1929 Kerry and 1932 Kerry.
