= John Joe Landers =

Kerry Gaelic footballer

John Joe "Purty" Landers
Personal information
- Native name: Seán Seosamh de Londras (Irish)
- Nickname: Purty
- Born: 23 April 1907 Tralee, County Kerry, Ireland
- Died: 27 August 2001 (aged 94) Millstreet, County Cork, Ireland
- Occupation: Bacon factory worker

Sport
- Sport: Gaelic football
- Position: Right corner-forward
Clubs
- Years: Club
- Tralee; Rock Street; Austin Stacks
Club titles
	Football	Hurling
Kerry titles	8	5
Inter-county
Years	County	Apps (scores)
1927–1938	Kerry	29 (11–20)
Inter-county titles
- Munster titles: 10
- All-Irelands: 5
- NFL: 4
- All Stars: 1

John Joseph Landers (23 April 1907 – 27 August 2001) was an Irish Gaelic footballer, Gaelic games administrator and republican activist. His league and championship career at senior level for the Kerry county team spanned twelve years from 1927 to 1938. Landers has been described as "one of [Kerry']s greatest football legends".

Raised in Tralee, County Kerry, Landers was one of six children born to the former Catherine Roche and Garrett Landers. He was educated locally and first played competitive hurling and Gaelic football with the combined Tralee district team with whom he won a combined total of five county senior championship medals in both codes between 1925 and 1927. With the newly created Rock Street club he won a further three county hurling championship medals, while with the Austin Stacks club Landers won five more county football championship medals.

Landers made his debut on the inter-county scene at the age of twenty when he was selected for the Kerry senior team. He made his debut during the 1927 championship. Over the course of the next eleven years, Landers won five All-Ireland medals, beginning with a record-equalling four championships in-a-row from 1929 to 1932 and a final lone triumph in 1937. He also won ten Munster medals and four National Football League medals. He played his last game for Kerry in October 1938. Landers's brothers, Bill and Tim, also enjoyed All-Ireland success with Kerry.

After being chosen on the Munster inter-provincial team for the first time in 1928, Landers was an automatic choice on the starting fifteen until 1935. During that time he won one Railway Cup medal.

Even during his playing days Landers became involved in the administrative affairs of the Gaelic Athletic Association. He served two years as joint-secretary of the Kerry County Board. Landers also served as a selector with the Kerry senior team.

In retirement from playing Landers came to be regarded as one of Kerry's greatest players of all time. In 1985 he and his brother Tim were presented with the GAA All-Time All Star Award.

Awards
Preceded by John Dunne (Galway)	GAA All-Time All Star Award; 1985	Succeeded by Alf Murray (Armagh)
