= All-Ireland Senior Football Championship records and statistics =

This article contains records and statistics related to the All-Ireland Senior Football Championship, which has run since 1887.

== General performances ==
=== Performance by county ===
County	Title(s)	Runners-up	Years won	Years runner-up
Kerry	39	25	1903, 1904, 1909, 1913, 1914, 1924, 1926, 1929, 1930, 1931, 1932, 1937, 1939, 1940, 1941, 1946, 1953, 1955, 1959, 1962, 1969, 1970, 1975, 1978, 1979, 1980, 1981, 1984, 1985, 1986, 1997, 2000, 2004, 2006, 2007, 2009, 2014, 2022, 2025	1892, 1905, 1910, 1915, 1923, 1927, 1938, 1944, 1947, 1954, 1960, 1964, 1965, 1968, 1972, 1976, 1982, 2002, 2005, 2008, 2011, 2015, 2019, 2023, 2026
Dublin	31	13	1891, 1892, 1894, 1897, 1898, 1899, 1901, 1902, 1906, 1907, 1908, 1921, 1922, 1923, 1942, 1958, 1963, 1974, 1976, 1977, 1983, 1995, 2011, 2013, 2015, 2016, 2017, 2018, 2019, 2020, 2023	1896, 1904, 1920, 1924, 1934, 1955, 1975, 1978, 1979, 1984, 1985, 1992, 1994
Galway	9	15	1925, 1934, 1938, 1956, 1964, 1965, 1966, 1998, 2001	1919, 1922, 1933, 1940, 1941, 1942, 1959, 1963, 1971, 1973, 1974, 1983, 2000, 2022, 2024
Cork	7	16	1890, 1911, 1945, 1973, 1989, 1990, 2010	1891, 1893, 1894, 1897, 1899, 1906, 1907, 1956, 1957, 1967, 1987, 1988, 1993, 1999, 2007, 2009
Meath	7	9	1949, 1954, 1967, 1987, 1988, 1996, 1999	1895, 1939, 1951, 1952, 1966, 1970, 1990, 1991, 2001
Cavan	5	6	1933, 1935, 1947, 1948, 1952	1925, 1928, 1937, 1943, 1945, 1949
Wexford	5	3	1893, 1915, 1916, 1917, 1918	1890, 1913, 1914
Down	5	1	1960, 1961, 1968, 1991, 1994	2010
Mayo	4	15	1936, 1950, 1951, 2026	1916, 1921, 1932, 1948, 1989, 1996, 1997, 2004, 2006, 2012, 2013, 2016, 2017, 2020, 2021
Kildare	4	5	1905, 1919, 1927, 1928	1926, 1929, 1931, 1935, 1998
Tyrone	4	3	2003, 2005, 2008, 2021	1986, 1995, 2018
Tipperary	4	1	1889, 1895, 1900, 1920	1918
Offaly	3	3	1971, 1972, 1982	1961, 1969, 1981
Louth	3	3	1910, 1912, 1957	1887, 1909, 1950
Roscommon	2	3	1943, 1944	1946, 1962, 1980
Donegal	2	2	1992, 2012	2014, 2025
Armagh	2	2	2002, 2024	1953, 1977
Limerick	2	0	1887, 1896	–
Derry	1	1	1993	1958
London^{[a]}	0	5	–	1900, 1901, 1902, 1903, 1908
Laois	0	2	–	1889, 1936
Antrim	0	2	–	1911, 1912
Waterford	0	1	–	1898
Clare	0	1	–	1917
Monaghan	0	1	-	1930

a. London received a bye to the final in five seasons.

=== Performance by province ===
Province	Won	Lost	Total	Different counties
Leinster	52	38	90	7
Munster	52	42	94	6
Ulster	19	18	37	8
Connacht	15	33	48	3

=== Provincial titles ===
County	Titles	Last provincial title
Kerry	87	2026 (Munster)
Dublin	63	2024 (Leinster)
Galway	51	2025 (Connacht)
Mayo	48	2021 (Connacht)
Cavan	40	2020 (Ulster)
Cork	37	2012 (Munster)
Roscommon	25	2026 (Connacht)
Meath	21	2010 (Leinster)
Monaghan	16	2015 (Ulster)
Tyrone	16	2021 (Ulster)
Armagh	15	2026 (Ulster)
Kildare	13	2000 (Leinster)
Down	12	1994 (Ulster)
Donegal	12	2025 (Ulster)
Wexford	10	1945 (Leinster)
Antrim	10	1951 (Ulster)
Offaly	10	1997 (Leinster)
Tipperary	10	2020 (Munster)
Derry	9	2023 (Ulster)
Louth	9	2025 (Leinster)
Laois	6	2003 (Leinster)
Kilkenny	3	1911 (Leinster)
Sligo	3	2007 (Connacht)
Clare	2	1992 (Munster)
Leitrim	2	1994 (Connacht)
Westmeath	2	2026 (Leinster)
Limerick	1	1896 (Munster)
Waterford	1	1898 (Munster)
Carlow	1	1944 (Leinster)
Longford	1	1968 (Leinster)

== Counties ==
=== Consecutive wins ===
==== Sextuple ====
- Dublin (2015, 2016, 2017, 2018, 2019, 2020)

==== Quadruple ====
- Wexford (1915, 1916, 1917, 1918)
- Kerry (1929, 1930, 1931, 1932)
- Kerry (1978, 1979, 1980, 1981)

==== Treble ====
- Dublin (1897, 1898, 1899)
- Dublin (1906, 1907, 1908)
- Dublin (1921, 1922, 1923)
- Kerry (1939, 1940, 1941)
- Galway (1964, 1965, 1966)
- Kerry (1984, 1985, 1986)

==== Double ====
- Dublin (1891, 1892)
- Dublin (1901, 1902)
- Kerry (1903, 1904)
- Kerry (1913, 1914)
- Kildare (1927, 1928)
- Roscommon (1943, 1944)
- Cavan (1947, 1948)
- Mayo (1950, 1951)
- Down (1960, 1961)
- Kerry (1969, 1970)
- Offaly (1971, 1972)
- Dublin (1976, 1977)
- Meath (1987, 1988)
- Cork (1989, 1990)
- Kerry (2006, 2007)

==== Single ====
- Kerry (1909, 1924, 1926, 1937, 1946, 1953, 1955, 1959, 1962, 1975, 1997, 2000, 2004, 2009, 2014, 2022, 2025)
- Dublin (1894, 1942, 1958, 1963, 1974, 1983, 1995, 2011, 2013, 2023)
- Galway (1925, 1934, 1938, 1956, 1998, 2001)
- Cork (1890, 1911, 1945, 1973, 2010)
- Meath (1949, 1954, 1967, 1996, 1999)
- Tipperary (1889, 1895, 1900, 1920)
- Tyrone (2003, 2005, 2008, 2021)
- Louth (1910, 1912, 1957)
- Cavan (1933, 1935, 1952)
- Down (1968, 1991, 1994)
- Limerick (1887, 1896)
- Kildare (1905, 1919)
- Donegal (1992, 2012)
- Armagh (2002, 2024)
- Wexford (1893)
- Mayo (1936, 2026)
- Offaly (1982)
- Derry (1993)

=== Consecutive All-Ireland Stoppers ===
Teams that ended All-Ireland winning streaks in the final of the championship.

==== 5-in-a-row ====
- Offaly (1982) defeated Kerry

==== 4-in-a-row ====
Kerry (1924) defeated Dublin

==== 3-in-a-row ====
Kildare (1905) defeated Kerry

Wexford (1915) defeated Kerry

Kerry (1929, 1978) defeated Kildare in 1929, Dublin in 1978

Meath (1949) defeated Cavan

Tyrone (2008) defeated Kerry

==== 2-in-a-row ====
Dublin (1891, 1976, 2015, 2023) defeated Cork in 1891 and Kerry in 1976, 2015 and 2023)

Louth (1910) defeated Kerry

Kildare (1927) defeated Kerry

Galway (1938) defeated Kerry

Cavan (1947) defeated Kerry

Meath (1954) defeated Kerry

Down (1960) defeated Kerry

Kerry (1975, 1984) defeated Dublin in 1975 and 1984

Tyrone (2003, 2005) defeated Armagh in 2003 and Kerry in 2005

Mayo (2026) defeated Kerry

=== By semi-final appearances ===
As of 30 June 2024.

#	Team	No. of Appearances	First semi-final	Most recent semi-final
1	Kerry	86	1903	2025
2	Dublin	55	1891	2025
3	Mayo	50	1901	2025
4	Galway	44	1890	2024
5	Cavan	40	1891	2020
6	Cork	36	1890	2012
7	Meath	22	1939	2025
8	Roscommon	20	1892	1991
9	Tyrone	18	1956	2025
10	Kildare	14	1903	2010
10	Monaghan	14	1907	2023
12	Down	13	1959	2010
13	Armagh	12	1890	2024
14	Derry	11	1958	2023
15	Offaly	10	1960	1997
15	Tipperary	10	1887	2020
15	Donegal	11	1972	2025
18	Antrim	9	1900	1951
18	Wexford	9	1890	2008
20	Louth	8	1909	1957
21	Laois	4	1936	1946
22	London	3	1906	1910
22	Sligo	3	1922	1975
24	Kilkenny	2	1900	1911
24	Leitrim	2	1927	1994
24	Clare	2	1917	1992
27	Limerick	1	1887	1887
27	Carlow	1	1944	1944
27	Longford	1	1968	1968
27	Fermanagh	1	2004	2004
31	New York	0	—	—
31	Waterford	0	—	—
31	Westmeath	0	—	—
31	Wicklow	0	—	—

=== Semi-final appearances (2001–present) ===
- Highlighted years indicate the semi final win

#	County	No.	Years
1	Kerry	21	2001, 2002, 2003, 2004, 2005, 2006, 2007, 2008, 2009, 2011, 2013, 2014, 2015, 2016, 2017, 2019, 2021, 2022, 2023, 2024, 2025
2	Dublin	17	2002, 2006, 2007, 2010, 2011, 2012, 2013, 2014, 2015, 2016, 2017, 2018, 2019, 2020, 2021, 2022, 2023
3	Mayo	12	2004, 2006, 2011, 2012, 2013, 2014, 2015, 2016, 2017, 2019, 2020, 2021
4	Tyrone	11	2003, 2005, 2008, 2009, 2013, 2015, 2017, 2018, 2019, 2021, 2025
5	Cork	8	2002, 2005, 2006, 2007, 2008, 2009, 2010, 2012
6	Donegal	6	2003, 2011, 2012, 2014, 2024, 2025
7	Derry	4	2001, 2004, 2022, 2023
7	Armagh	4	2002, 2003, 2005, 2024
7	Galway	4	2001, 2018, 2022, 2024
10	Meath	4	2001, 2007, 2009, 2025
11	Tipperary	2	2016, 2020
11	Monaghan	2	2018, 2023
13	Fermanagh	1	2004
13	Wexford	1	2008
13	Kildare	1	2010
13	Down	1	2010
13	Cavan	1	2020

=== By province ===
==== Most successful provinces ====
- Cavan and Down are the Ulster teams with the most All-Ireland titles.
- Dublin are the Leinster team with the most All-Ireland titles.
- Galway are the Connacht team with the most All-Ireland titles.
- Kerry are the Munster team with the most All-Ireland titles.

#	Province	Wins	Runners-up	Total	% Success Rate	Winners by county	Losers by county
1	Leinster	52	38	90	57%	Dublin (30), Meath (7), Wexford (5), Kildare (4), Offaly (3), Louth (3)	Dublin (13), Meath (9), Kildare (5), Wexford (3), Offaly (3), Louth (3), Laois (2)
2	Munster	51	42	93	54.8%	Kerry (38), Cork (7), Tipperary (4), Limerick (2)	Kerry (23), Cork (16), Clare (1), Tipperary (1), Waterford (1)
3	Ulster	19	18	37	51.4%	Cavan (5), Down (5), Tyrone (4), Donegal (2), Armagh (2), Derry (1)	Cavan (6), Armagh (3), Tyrone (3), Antrim (2), Derry (1), Monaghan (1) Down (1), Donegal (1)
4	Connacht	15	33	48	29.8%	Galway (9), Mayo (4), Roscommon (2)	Galway (15), Mayo (15), Roscommon (3)
5	Britain	0	5	5	0%	—	London (5)

==== Provinces with highest number of different winning counties ====
The provinces providing the highest number of different winning counties are Leinster and Ulster, with six each. Dublin, Meath, Wexford, Kildare, Offaly and Louth from Leinster have won the title, while Cavan, Down, Tyrone, Donegal, Armagh and Derry are the successful Ulster sides. For Leinster's 12 counties, this represents a success rate of 50%, while Ulster's nine counties gives them a success rate of 67%. Four of Munster's six counties have won the title, giving an identical success rate to Ulster, while three of Connacht's five counties have been successful, a success rate of 60%.

== Least successful counties ==
There are eight counties that have never been represented in a Senior All-Ireland Final. These are Carlow, Fermanagh, Leitrim, Sligo, Westmeath, Wicklow, Longford, and New York. Four of these counties have never competed in a semi-final: Waterford, Westmeath, Wicklow, and New York.

Kilkenny currently do not compete in the All-Ireland Championship, having won three Leinster Senior Football Championships in the past, with the county instead prominent in the sport of hurling but have won the Junior All Ireland in 2022. Carlow also compete in hurling and have won an All-Ireland Senior B Hurling Championship. Westmeath have enjoyed considerable success in hurling in recent years, winning a number of All-Ireland Senior B Hurling Championships and Christy Ring Cups, and their Gaelic football team won the 2004 Leinster Football Championship and the inaugural Tailteann Cup in 2022.

Fermanagh came their closest in 2004, reaching a semi-final replay having defeated 1999 Champions Meath, 2002 Munster Champions Cork, 2003 All-Ireland semi-finalists Donegal and 2002 Champions Armagh. Wicklow's most notable recent achievement was winning the 2026 Tailteann Cup final with an historic 2nd half comeback against Down.

=== Levels ===
In the last few years, counties can be divided into four levels or tiers, based on results: Tier 1 counties are consistent participants in the latter stage of the All-Ireland. Tier 2 counties usually compete in the All-Ireland championship or the Tailteann Cup. Tier 3 counties are consistent participants in the Tailteann Cup. Tier 4 counties usually compete in the All-Ireland Junior Football Championship. There is a big gap between Tier 1, 2 and 3 counties and Tier 4 counties. Tier 4 counties also do not participate in the provincial championships.

Tier 1 counties (12): Armagh, Cork, Derry, Donegal, Dublin, Galway, Kerry, Kildare, Mayo, Monaghan, Roscommon, Tyrone

Tier 2 counties (11): Cavan, Clare, Down, Limerick, Longford, Louth, Meath, Offaly, Sligo, Tipperary, Westmeath

Tier 3 counties (10): Antrim, Carlow, Fermanagh, Laois, Leitrim, London, New York, Waterford, Wexford, Wicklow

Tier 4 counties (7): Gloucestershire, Hertfordshire, Lancashire, Kilkenny, Scotland, Warwickshire, Yorkshire

== Team participation ==
=== Debut of counties ===
Year	Debutants	Total
1887	Clare, Cork, Dublin, Galway, Kilkenny, Limerick, Louth, Meath, Tipperary, Waterford, Wexford, Wicklow	12
1888	Cavan, Kildare, Laois, Monaghan	4
1889	Kerry	1
1890	Antrim, Armagh, Tyrone, Westmeath	4
1891	None	0
1892	Roscommon	1
1893-95	None	0
1896	Offaly	1
1897	Carlow	1
1898-99	None	0
1900	London	1
1901	Mayo	1
1902	None	0
1903	Fermanagh, Longford	2
1904	Derry, Down	2
1905	Sligo	1
1906	Donegal, Leitrim	2
1907-98	None	0
1999	New York	1
2000-	None	0
Total		34

=== List of All-Ireland SFC counties ===
The following teams have competed in the All-Ireland SFC for at least one season.

County team	Appearances	Debut	Most recent	Current championship	Championship Titles (Most recent title)			Best All-Ireland result
County team	Appearances	Debut	Most recent	Current championship	All-Ireland Titles	Provincial Titles	Cup titles	Best All-Ireland result
Antrim		1890	2026	Ulster SFC	—N/a	10 (1951)	1 (2008)	Runners-up
Armagh		1890	2026	Ulster SFC	2 (2024)	15 (2026)	—N/a	Champions
Carlow		1897	2026	Leinster SFC	—N/a	1 (1944)	—N/a	Semi-finals
Cavan		1888	2026	Ulster SFC	5 (1952)	40 (2020)	—N/a	Champions
Clare		1887	2026	Munster SFC	—N/a	2 (1992)	1 (2004)	Runners-up
Cork		1887	2026	Munster SFC	7 (2010)	37 (2012)	—N/a	Champions
Derry		1904	2026	Ulster SFC	1 (1993)	9 (2023)	—N/a	Champions
Donegal		1906	2026	Ulster SFC	2 (2012)	12 (2025)	—N/a	Champions
Down		1904	2026	Ulster SFC	5 (1994)	12 (1994)	1 (2024)	Champions
Dublin		1887	2026	Leinster SFC	31 (2023)	63 (2024)	—N/a	Champions
Fermanagh		1903	2026	Ulster SFC	—N/a	—N/a	—N/a	Semi-finals
Galway		1887	2026	Connacht SFC	9 (2001)	51 (2025)	—N/a	Champions
Kerry		1889	2026	Munster SFC	38 (2025)	87 (2026)	—N/a	Champions
Kildare		1888	2026	Leinster SFC	4 (1928)	13 (2000)	1 (2025)	Champions
Kilkenny		1887	1982	All-Ireland JFC	—N/a	3 (1911)	—N/a	Semi-finals
Laois		1888	2026	Leinster SFC	—N/a	6 (2003)	—N/a	Runners-up
Leitrim		1906	2026	Connacht SFC	—N/a	2 (1994)	—N/a	Semi-finals
Limerick		1887	2026	Munster SFC	2 (1896)	1 (1896)	—N/a	Champions
London		1900	2026	Connacht SFC	—N/a	—N/a	—N/a	Runners-up
Longford		1903	2026	Leinster SFC	—N/a	1 (1968)	—N/a	Semi-finals
Louth		1887	2026	Leinster SFC	3 (1957)	9 (2025)	1 (2006)	Champions
Mayo		1901	2026	Connacht SFC	4 (2026)	48 (2021)	—N/a	Champions
Meath		1887	2026	Leinster SFC	7 (1999)	21 (2010)	1 (2023)	Champions
Monaghan		1888	2026	Ulster SFC	—N/a	16 (2015)	—N/a	Runners-up
New York	25	1999	2026	Connacht SFC	—N/a	—N/a	—N/a	Connacht semi-finals
Offaly		1896	2026	Leinster SFC	3 (1982)	10 (1997)	—N/a	Champions
Roscommon		1892	2026	Connacht SFC	2 (1944)	25 (2026)	—N/a	Champions
Sligo		1905	2026	Connacht SFC	—N/a	3 (2007)	—N/a	Semi-finals
Tipperary		1887	2026	Munster SFC	4 (1920)	10 (2020)	1 (2005)	Champions
Tyrone		1890	2026	Ulster SFC	4 (2021)	16 (2021)	—N/a	Champions
Waterford		1887	2026	Munster SFC	—N/a	1 (1898)	—N/a	Runners-up
Westmeath		1890	2026	Leinster SFC	—N/a	2 (2026)	1 (2022)	Quarter-finals
Wexford		1887	2026	Leinster SFC	5 (1918)	10 (1945)	—N/a	Champions
Wicklow		1887	2026	Leinster SFC	—N/a	—N/a	2 (2026)	Leinster runners-up

== Other records ==
=== By decade ===
The most successful team of each decade, judged by number of All-Ireland titles, is as follows:

- 1890s: 6 for Dublin (1891, 1892, 1894, 1897, 1898, 1899)
- 1900s: 5 for Dublin (1901, 1902, 1906, 1907, 1908)
- 1910s: 4 for Wexford (1915, 1916, 1917, 1918)
- 1920s: 3 each for Dublin (1921, 1922, 1923) and Kerry (1924, 1926, 1929)
- 1930s: 5 for Kerry (1930, 1931, 1932, 1937, 1939)
- 1940s: 3 for Kerry (1940, 1941, 1946)
- 1950s: 3 for Kerry (1953, 1955, 1959)
- 1960s: 3 each for Down (1960, 1961, 1968) and Galway (1964, 1965, 1966)
- 1970s: 4 for Kerry (1970, 1975, 1978, 1979)
- 1980s: 5 for Kerry (1980, 1981, 1984, 1985, 1986)
- 1990s: 2 each for Down (1991, 1994) and Meath (1996, 1999)
- 2000s: 5 for Kerry (2000, 2004, 2006, 2007, 2009)
- 2010s: 7 for Dublin (2011, 2013, 2015, 2016, 2017, 2018, 2019)
- 2020s: 2 each for Dublin (2020, 2023)

and Kerry (2022, 2025)

=== Finishing positions ===
- Most championships
  - 39, Kerry (1903, 1904, 1909, 1913, 1914, 1924, 1926, 1929, 1930, 1931, 1932, 1937, 1939, 1940, 1941, 1946, 1953, 1955, 1959, 1962, 1969, 1970, 1975, 1978, 1979, 1980, 1981, 1984, 1985, 1986, 1997, 2000, 2004, 2006, 2007, 2009, 2014, 2022, 2025)
- Most second-place finishes
  - 25, Kerry (1892, 1905, 1910, 1915, 1923, 1927, 1938, 1944, 1947, 1954, 1960, 1964, 1965, 1968, 1972, 1976, 1982, 2002, 2005, 2008, 2011, 2015, 2019, 2023, 2026)
- Most semi-final finishes
  - 32, Mayo (1901, 1904, 1906, 1907, 1908, 1909, 1910, 1915, 1918, 1920, 1923, 1924, 1929, 1930, 1931, 1935, 1937, 1939, 1949, 1955, 1967, 1969, 1981, 1985, 1988, 1992, 1993, 1999, 2011, 2014, 2015, 2019)
- Most quarter-final finishes
  - 7, Tyrone (2001, 2004, 2007, 2010, 2011, 2016, 2023)
  - 7, Galway (2002, 2003, 2005, 2008, 2014, 2016, 2017)
  - 7, Armagh (2004, 2006, 2008, 2014, 2017, 2022, 2023)
- Most preliminary quarter-final finishes
  - 1, Cork (2024, 2025)
- Most group stage finishes (includes Super 8's)
  - 3, Clare (2023, 2024, 2025)
- Most qualifier round 3 finishes
  - 6, Derry (2002, 2006, 2009, 2010, 2013, 2015)
- Most qualifier round 2 finishes
  - 11, Leitrim (2002, 2003, 2004, 2005, 2006, 2010, 2011, 2013, 2016, 2017, 2019)
- Most qualifier round 1 finishes
  - 14, London (2002, 2003, 2004, 2005, 2006, 2009, 2010, 2012, 2014, 2015, 2016, 2017, 2018, 2019)

=== Unbeaten sides ===
- 132 teams have won the All-Ireland SFC unbeaten out of a possible 136.

=== Beaten sides ===
The introduction of the qualifier system in 2001 has resulted in 4 'back-door' All-Ireland champions:

- Galway (2001) were beaten by Roscommon in the Connacht semi-finals.
- Tyrone (2005) were beaten by Armagh in the Ulster final.
- Kerry (2006) were beaten by Cork in the Munster final.
- Cork (2010) were beaten by Kerry in the Munster semi-finals.

On a number of occasions a team was defeated twice but have remained in the knockout championship:

- Tyrone (2018) were beaten by Monaghan and Dublin but still qualified for the knockout stage.
- Mayo (2019) were beaten by Roscommon and Kerry but still qualified for the knockout stage.
- Tyrone (2019) were beaten by Donegal and Dublin but still qualified for the knockout stage.
- Cork (2023) were beaten by Clare and Kerry but still qualified for the knockout stage.
- Armagh (2023) were beaten by Derry and Tyrone but still qualified for the knockout stage.
- Tyrone (2023) were beaten by Monaghan and Galway but still qualified for the knockout stage.
- Roscommon (2023) were beaten by Galway and Kildare but still qualified for the knockout stage.
- Kildare (2023) were beaten by Dublin twice but still qualified for the knockout stage.
- Donegal (2023) were beaten by Down and Derry but still qualified for the knockout stage.
- Monaghan (2023) were beaten by Derry and Donegal but still qualified for the knockout stage.

=== Final success rate ===
Only 1 county have appeared in the final, being victorious on all occasions:

- Limerick (Limerick won the first ever All-Ireland Senior Football Championship Final and its 100% success rate has only ever been threatened once - in 1896. It remained intact)

On the opposite end of the scale, six counties have appeared in the All-Ireland final, losing on each occasion:

- Laois (1889, 1936)
- Antrim (1911, 1912)
- Waterford (1898)
- Clare (1917)
- Monaghan (1930)
- London (1900, 1901, 1902, 1903, 1908). In each of London's first four appearances in the Final, they have been the beneficiaries of byes to that stage. From the 1900 Championship to the 1903 Championship, the GAA ran the competition between teams based in Ireland first, with the winners of the 'Home Final' going on to play London in the 'Grand Final'. In 1908 London qualified for the Final by winning the semi-final.

=== Consecutive participations ===
- 0, 000 (0000–0000)

00 have the record number of consecutive participations in the All-Ireland SFC, taking part in the 0 seasons.

=== Winning other trophies ===
Although not an officially recognised achievement, a number of teams have achieved the distinction of winning the All-Ireland, their provincial championship and the National Football League all in the same season.

- 10, Kerry (1929, 1931, 1932, 1959, 1969, 1984, 1997, 2004, 2022, 2025)
- 6, Dublin (1958, 1976, 2013, 2015, 2016, 2018)
- 2, Down (1960, 1968)
- 1, Mayo (1936)
- 1, Cavan (1948)
- 1, Galway (1965)
- 1, Meath (1978)
- 1, Cork (1989)
- 1, Tyrone (2003)

=== Biggest wins ===
- The most one sided All-Ireland finals:
  - **19 points** – 1911: Cork 6-06 - 1-02 Antrim
  - **18 points** – 1936: Mayo 4-11 - 0-05 Laois
  - **18 points** - 1930: Kerry 3-11 - 0-02 Monaghan
  - **17 points** – 1978: Kerry 5-11 - 0-09 Dublin
  - **14 points** – 1900: Tipperary 3-07 - 0-02 London
- The most one sided All-Ireland semi-finals:
  - **27 points** – 1901: Cork 4-16 - 0-01 Mayo
  - **22 points** – 1979: Kerry 5-14 - 0-07 Monaghan
  - **21 points** - 1904: Kerry 4-10 - 0-01 Cavan
  - **20 points** – 1993: Cork 5-15 - 0-10 Mayo
  - **20 points** – 2025: Donegal 3-26 - 0-15 Meath
- The most one sided All-Ireland quarter-finals:
  - **27 points** – 2015: Kerry 7-16 - 0-10 Kildare
  - **22 points** – 2017: Mayo 4-19 - 0-09 Roscommon
  - **19 points** – 2003: Tyrone 1-21 - 0-05 Fermanagh
  - **18 points** – 2019: Dublin 2-26 - 0-14 Roscommon
  - **18 points** – 2017: Tyrone 3-17 - 0-08 Armagh
  - **18 points** – 2018: Tyrone 4-24 - 2-12 Roscommon
- The most one sided Connacht finals:
  - **26 points** – 2015: Mayo 6-25 - 2-11 Sligo
  - **20 points** – 1967: Mayo 4-15 - 0-07 Leitrim
  - **17 points** - 1907: Mayo 3-09 - 0-01 Galway
  - **16 points** – 1956: Galway 4-08 - 0-04 Leitrim
  - **16 points** – 2013: Mayo 5-11 - 0-10 London
- The most one sided Leinster finals:
  - **23 points** – 2008: Dublin 3-23 - 0-09 Wexford
  - **21 points** – 2020: Dublin 3-21 - 0-09 Meath
  - **21 points** – 2023: Dublin 5-21 - 0-15 Louth
  - **20 points** – 1955: Dublin 5-12 - 0-07 Meath (this is the biggest ever defeat of a reigning All-Ireland champion team)
  - **18 points** - 1951: Meath 4-09 - 0-03 Laois
  - **18 points** – 2018: Dublin 1-25 - 0-10 Laois
- The most one sided Munster finals:
  - **23 points** - 2022: Kerry 1-28 - 0-08 Limerick
  - **23 points** – 1919: Kerry 6-11 - 2-00 Clare
  - **22 points** – 2021: Kerry 4-22 - 1-09 Cork
  - **21 points** – 1931: Kerry 5-08 - 0-02 Tipperary
  - **20 points** - 1925: Kerry 5-05 - 0-00 Clare
- The most one sided Ulster finals:
  - **26 points** – 1933: Cavan 6-13 - 1-02 Tyrone
  - **21 points** – 1923: Cavan 5-10 - 1-01 Monaghan
  - **20 points** - 1942: Cavan 5-11 - 1-03 Down
  - **19 points** – 1919: Cavan 5-06 - 0-02 Antrim
  - **15 points** – 2003: Tyrone 0-23 - 1-05 Down

=== Scoring Events (2018–present) ===
As of 27 June 2024.

- Most goals in a match:
  - **9** – 2022: Wicklow 5-15 - 4-12 Laois
- Most points in a match:
  - **45** – 2018: London 1–19 – 2-26 Louth
- Most goals by one team in a match:
  - **7** – 2020: Wicklow 0-07 - 7-14 Meath
- Most points by one team in a match:
  - **32** – 2018: Kerry 0-32 - 0-10 Clare
- Highest aggregate score:
  - **58 points** – 2018: Dublin 4-24 - 2-16 Roscommon
- Lowest aggregate score:
  - **17 points** – 2019: Clare 0-09 - 0-08 Waterford

=== Successful defending ===
Only 12 teams of the 19 who have won the All-Ireland championship have ever successfully defended the title. These are:

- Kerry on 14 attempts out of 38 (1904, 1914, 1930, 1931, 1932, 1940, 1941, 1970, 1979, 1980, 1981, 1985, 1986, 2007)
- Dublin on 14 attempts out of 30 (1892, 1898, 1899, 1902, 1907, 1908, 1922, 1923, 1977, 2016, 2017, 2018, 2019, 2020)
- Wexford on 3 attempts out of 5 (1916, 1917, 1918)
- Galway on 2 attempts out of 9 (1965, 1966)
- Cork on 1 attempts out of 7 (1990)
- Meath on 1 attempts out of 7 (1988)
- Cavan on 1 attempts out of 5 (1948)
- Down on 1 attempts out of 5 (1961)
- Kildare on 1 attempts out of 4 (1928)
- Mayo on 1 attempts out of 3 (1951)
- Offaly on 1 attempts out of 3 (1972)
- Roscommon on 1 attempts out of 2 (1944)
- Tyrone on 0 attempts out of 4
- Tipperary on 0 attempts out of 4
- Louth on 0 attempts out of 3
- Donegal on 0 attempts out of 2
- Limerick on 0 attempts out of 2
- Armagh on 0 attempts out of 1
- Derry on 0 attempts out of 1

=== Gaps ===
- Longest gaps between successive titles:
  - 75 years: Mayo (1951–2026)
  - 45 years: Louth (1912–1957)
  - 34 years: Cork (1911–1945)
  - 32 years: Galway (1966–1998)
  - 28 years: Cork (1945–1973)
  - 23 years: Down (1968–1991)
  - 22 years: Wexford (1893–1915)
  - 22 years: Armagh (2002–2024)
  - 21 years: Cork (1890–1911)
  - 20 years: Cork (1990–2010)
  - 20 years: Donegal (1992–2012)
- Longest gaps between successive All-Ireland final appearances:
  - 63 years: Kildare (1935–1998)
  - 47 years: Laois (1889–1936)
  - 44 years: Meath (1895–1939)
  - 38 years: Louth (1912–1950)
  - 38 years: Mayo (1951–1989)
  - 35 years: Derry (1958–1993)
  - 34 years: Cork (1911–1945)
  - 25 years: Armagh (1977–2002)
  - 24 years: Armagh (1953–1977)
  - 23 years: Down (1968–1991)
- Longest gap between successive championship appearances
  - 62 years: London (1913–1975)

=== Active gaps ===
- Longest active gaps since last title:
  - 130 years: Limerick (1896–)
  - 108 years: Wexford (1918–)
  - 106 years: Tipperary (1920–)
  - 98 years: Kildare (1928–)
  - 82 years: Roscommon (1944–)
  - 74 years: Cavan (1952–)
  - 69 years: Louth (1957–)
  - 44 years: Offaly (1982–)
  - 33 years: Derry (1993–)
  - 32 years: Down (1994–)
  - 27 years: Meath (1999–)
  - 25 years: Galway (2001–)
- Longest active gaps since last All-Ireland final appearance:
  - 130 years: Limerick (1896–)
  - 128 years: Waterford (1898–)
  - 118 years: London (1908–)
  - 114 years: Antrim (1912–)
  - 109 years: Clare (1917–)
  - 108 years: Wexford (1918–)
  - 106 years: Tipperary (1920–)
  - 96 years: Monaghan (1930–)
  - 90 years: Laois (1936–)
  - 74 years: Cavan (1952–)
  - 69 years: Louth (1957–)
  - 46 years: Roscommon (1980–)
  - 44 years: Offaly (1982–)
  - 33 years: Derry (1993–)
  - 28 years: Kildare (1998–)
  - 25 years: Meath (2001–)
- Longest active gap since last championship appearance
  - 44 years: Kilkenny (1982–)

=== Provinces ===
- On 3 occasions has the All-Ireland final involved two teams from the same province.
  - Ulster: Tyrone vs Armagh (2003)
  - Munster: Kerry vs Cork (2007)
  - Munster: Kerry vs Cork (2009)
- The province providing the highest number of different winning teams is Leinster and Ulster, with six each:
  - Leinster: Dublin, Kildare, Louth, Meath, Offaly, Wexford
  - Ulster: Armagh, Cavan, Derry, Down, Donegal, Tyrone
- Province success rates
  - Ulster 67% (6 out of 9 counties)
  - Munster 67% (4 out of 6 counties)
  - Connacht 60% (3 out of 5 counties)
  - Leinster 50% (6 out of 12 counties)

=== Counties in an All-Ireland final without a provincial title ===
Bold = winners

- London (1900, 1901, 1902, 1903, 1908)
- Kerry (2002, **2006**, 2008, 2009)
- Tyrone (**2005**, **2008**, 2018)
- Mayo (2016, 2017, **2026**)
- Cork (2007, **2010**)
- Limerick (**1887**)
- Louth (1887)
- Galway (**2001**)
- Armagh (2003, **2024**)
- Down (2010)

Note: The 1887, 2008 and 2010 finals featured two teams that had not won their provincial championship that year (There were no provincial championships in 1887).

=== All-Ireland final pairings ===
Pairing	Meeting	First	Last meeting
Dublin v Kerry	15	1892	2023
Galway v Kerry	8	1938	2022
Cork v Dublin	6	1891	1907
Dublin v Galway	6	1922	1983
Cork v Meath	5	1967	1999
Dublin v Mayo	5	1921	2020
Kerry v Mayo	5	1932	2026
Kerry v Kildare	5	1905	1931
Kerry v Offaly	4	1969	1982
Kerry v Roscommon	4	1944	1980
Dublin v London	3	1901	1908
Kerry v Meath	3	1939	1970
Kerry v Tyrone	3	1986	2008
Kerry v Wexford	3	1913	1915
Armagh v Kerry	2	1953	2002
Cavan v Galway	2	1925	1933
Cavan v Kerry	2	1937	1947
Cavan v Kildare	2	1928	1935
Cavan v Meath	2	1949	1952
Cork v Galway	2	1956	1973
Cork v Kerry	2	2007	2009
Cork v Wexford	2	1890	1893
Down v Kerry	2	1960	1968
Dublin v Tyrone	2	1995	2018
Galway v Kildare	2	1919	1998
Galway v Meath	2	1966	2001
Kerry v Louth	2	1909	1910
Mayo v Meath	2	1951	1996
Donegal v Kerry	2	2014	2025
Antrim v Cork	1	1911	
Antrim v Louth	1	1912	
Armagh v Dublin	1	1977	
Armagh v Galway	1	2024	
Armagh v Tyrone	1	2003	
Cavan v Cork	1	1945	
Cavan v Mayo	1	1948	
Cavan v Roscommon	1	1943	
Clare v Wexford	1	1917	
Cork v Derry	1	1993	
Cork v Down	1	2010	
Cork v Louth	1	1957	
Cork v Mayo	1	1989	
Derry v Dublin	1	1958	
Donegal v Dublin	1	1992	
Donegal v Mayo	1	2012	
Down v Dublin	1	1994	
Down v Meath	1	1991	
Down v Offaly	1	1961	
Dublin v Limerick	1	1896	
Dublin v Tipperary	1	1920	
Dublin v Waterford	1	1898	
Galway v Offaly	1	1971	
Kerry v London	1	1903	
Kerry v Monaghan	1	1930	
Laois v Mayo	1	1936	
Laois v Tipperary	1	1889	
Limerick v Louth	1	1887	
London v Tipperary	1	1900	
Louth v Mayo	1	1950	
Mayo v Wexford	1	1916	
Mayo v Tyrone	1	2021	
Meath v Tipperary	1	1895	
Tipperary v Wexford	1	1918	

=== Longest undefeated run ===
- 45 games - Dublin (2015–2021): The record for the longest unbeaten run stands at 45 games held by Dublin. It began with a 4–25 to 0–10 win against Longford in their opening game of the 2015 championship and finished with a 0–20 to 1–09 win against Kildare in the Leinster final of the 2021 championship. The 45-game unbeaten streak ended with a 0–17 to 0–14 loss after extra-time to Mayo in the 2021 All-Ireland semi-final.

=== Miscellaneous ===
- Best finish by a debuting team
  - Champions, Limerick (1887)
- Highest winning record in final (3 or more finals)
  - 83%, Down (5 wins in 6 matches)
- Lowest winning record in final (3 or more finals)
  - 0%, London (0 wins in 5 matches)
- Most played match
  - Cork vs Kerry

In 2016 Galway became the first team to be knocked out of both Hurling and Football Championships by the same county (Tipperary)in the same season

=== Disciplinary ===
- In 1943, Joe Stafford of Cavan became the first player to be sent off in an All-Ireland Senior football final. Others to have been sent off since then include John Donnellan of Galway and the brothers Derry O'Shea and John 'Thorny' O'Shea of Kerry in 1965, Charlie Nelligan of Kerry in 1978, Páidí Ó Sé of Kerry in 1979, Brian Mullins, Kieran Duff, Ray Hazley of Dublin and Tomás Tierney of Galway in 1983, Gerry McEntee of Meath in the 1988 replay, Tony Davis of Cork in 1993, Charlie Redmond of Dublin in 1995, Liam McHale of Mayo and Colm Coyle of Meath in the 1996 replay, Nigel Nestor of Meath in 2001, Diarmaid Marsden of Armagh in 2003, Donal Vaughan of Mayo in 2017, John Small of Dublin in 2017 and again in 2018, Jonny Cooper of Dublin in the 2019 drawn game, and Matthew Ruane of Mayo in 2021.
- Nine players have received black cards during All-Ireland finals: Johnny Buckley and Aidan O'Mahony, both of Kerry, in the 2014 and 2015 finals, respectively; James McCarthy of Dublin in the 2016 drawn game; Jonny Cooper of Dublin and Rob Hennelly and Lee Keegan of Mayo in the 2016 replay; Ciarán Kilkenny of Dublin in 2017; Kieran McGeary of Tyrone in 2018 and Robbie McDaid of Dublin in 2020.
- Galway holds the record of losing a final to a team containing the fewest players, they were beaten by a Dublin team which had been reduced to just 12 players in the All-Ireland Final of 1983.

=== Fastest goals in Finals ===
- 12 seconds- Dean Rock (2020)
- 35 seconds - Garry McMahon (1962)
- 35 seconds - John 'Jigger' O'Connor (1980)
- 49 seconds - Paul Geaney (2014)
- 1 minute - Con O'Callaghan (2017)
- 3 minutes - Michael Murphy (2012)
- 4 minutes - Alan Dillon (2004)
- 5 minutes - Joe Kavanagh (1993)
- 6 minutes - Dara Ó Cinnéide (2005)

== Managers ==
=== Winning managers (2002–present) ===
#	Manager(s)	Winning team(s)	Titles(s)	Winning years
1	Jim Gavin	Dublin	6	2013, 2015, 2016, 2017, 2018, 2019
2	Jack O'Connor	Kerry	5	2004, 2006, 2009, 2022, 2025
3	Mickey Harte	Tyrone	3	2003, 2005, 2008,
4	Dessie Farrell	Dublin	2	2020, 2023
5	Joe Kernan	Armagh	1	2002
5	Pat O'Shea	Kerry	1	2007
5	Conor Counihan	Cork	1	2010
5	Pat Gilroy	Dublin	1	2011
5	Jim McGuinness	Donegal	1	2012
5	Éamonn Fitzmaurice	Kerry	1	2014
5	Feargal Logan and Brian Dooher	Tyrone	1	2021
5	Kieran McGeeney	Armagh	1	2024

== Players ==
=== All-time top scorers ===
==== (Those who have accumulated over 166 points) ====
As of match played 26 July 2026 (21:00)

Rank	Player	Team	Goals	Points	Tally	Games	Era	Average
1	Cillian O'Connor	Mayo	34	367	469	75	2011-2026	6.1
2	David Clifford	Kerry	29	272	359	53	2018-present	6.8
3	Colm Cooper	Kerry	23	283	352	85	2002-2017	4.1
4	Dean Rock	Dublin	13	292	331	63	2013-2023	5.2
5	Conor McManus	Monaghan	9	288	315	72	2005-2024	4.3
6	Michael Murphy	Donegal	4	289	301	79	2007-2026	3.8
7	Mikey Sheehy	Kerry	29	205	292	49	1973-1988	6.0
8	Seán O'Shea	Kerry	7	261	282	50	2018-present	5.7
9	John Doyle	Kildare	8	258	282	67	1999-2014	4.2
10	Pádraic Joyce	Galway	12	229	265	66	1997-2012	4.0
11	Shane Walsh	Galway	10	234	264	62	2013-present	4.2
12	Bernard Brogan	Dublin	21	197	260	59	2006-2019	4.4
13	Darren McCurry	Tyrone	5	243	258	69	2012-present	3.7
14	Paddy Bradley	Derry	17	202	253	44	1999-2012	5.8
15	Steven McDonnell	Armagh	18	197	251	67	1999-2011	3.7
16	Maurice Fitzgerald	Kerry	12	205	241	45	1988-2001	5.4
17	Cormac Costello	Dublin	10	215	245	67	2013-present	3.6
18	Brian Stafford	Meath	9	206	233	41	1986-1995	5.7
19	Con O'Callaghan	Dublin	23	164	233	62	2016-present	3.8
20	Oisín McConville	Armagh	11	197	230	52	1994-2008	4.4
21	Patrick McBrearty	Donegal	9	202	229	78	2011-2025	2.9
22	Barney Rock	Dublin	16	181	229	39	1980-1991	5.9
23	Jimmy Keaveney	Dublin	15	182	227	42	1964-1980	5.4
24	Tony McTague	Offaly	4	210	222	37	1965-1975	6.0
25	Peter Canavan	Tyrone	9	192	219	58	1989-2005	3.8
26	Ryan O'Donoghue	Mayo	9	190	217	37	2020-present	5.9
27	Ross Munnelly	Laois	7	190	211	79	2003-2022	2.7
28	Paul Geaney	Kerry	17	158	209	64	2011-present	3.2
29	Seán Cavanagh	Tyrone	9	181	208	89	2002-2017	2.3
30	Paddy Doherty	Down	15	158	203	48	1954-1971	4.2
31	Colin Corkery	Cork	5	182	197	32	1993-2004	6.2
32	John Heslin	Westmeath	4	176	188	41	2011-2024	4.6
33	Dara O'Cinneide	Kerry	11	149	182	54	1995-2005	3.4
34	Matt Connor	Offaly	13	142	181	26	1978-1984	7.0
35	Ciarán Kilkenny	Dublin	7	159	180	86	2012-present	2.1
36	Pat Spillane	Kerry	19	123	180	56	1974-1991	3.2
37	Donal Kingston	Laois	7	158	179	44	2007-present	4.1
38	Declan Browne	Tipperary	9	141	168	25	1996-2007	6.7
39	David Tubridy	Clare	9	140	167	43	2007-2022	3.9

=== All-time appearances ===
As of match played 12 July 2026

Rank	Player	Team	Appearances	Year
1	Stephen Cluxton	Dublin	128	2001-2025
2	Aidan O'Shea	Mayo	100	2009-present
3	Seán Cavanagh	Tyrone	89	2002-2017
4	Marc Ó Sé	Kerry	88	2002-2015
5	Tomás Ó Sé	Kerry	88	1998-2013
6	Ciarán Kilkenny	Dublin	86	2012-present
7	Colm Cooper	Kerry	85	2002-2016
8	Andy Moran	Mayo	84	2004-2019
9	Darragh Ó Sé	Kerry	81	1997-2010
10	Michael Murphy	Donegal	79	2007-2026
11	Ross Munnelly	Laois	79	2003-2022
12	Neil McGee	Donegal	77	2005-2022
13	Tom O'Sullivan	Kerry	76	2000-2011
14	Conor Gormley	Tyrone	75	2001-2014
15	Keith Higgins	Mayo	74	2005-2021
16	Brian Dooher	Tyrone	73	1995-2011
17	John O'Leary	Dublin	70	1980-1997
17	Declan O'Sullivan	Kerry	70	2003-14
17	Aidan O'Mahony	Kerry	70	2004-17

=== Other records ===
==== Most wins ====
- 3 players have won nine All-Ireland medals:
  - Stephen Cluxton of Dublin: 2011, 2013, 2015, 2016, 2017, 2018, 2019, 2020, 2023
  - Michael Fitzsimons of Dublin: 2011, 2013, 2015, 2016, 2017, 2018, 2019, 2020, 2023
  - James McCarthy of Dublin: 2011, 2013, 2015, 2016, 2017, 2018, 2019, 2020, 2023
- 12 players have won eight All-Ireland medals:
  - Dean Rock of Dublin: 2013, 2015, 2016, 2017, 2018, 2019, 2020, 2023
  - Ciarán Kilkenny of Dublin: 2013, 2015, 2016, 2017, 2018, 2019, 2020, 2023
  - Cormac Costello of Dublin: 2013, 2015, 2016, 2017, 2018, 2019, 2020, 2023
  - Pat Spillane of Kerry: 1975, 1978, 1979, 1980, 1981, 1984, 1985, 1986
  - Páidí Ó Sé of Kerry: 1975, 1978, 1979, 1980, 1981, 1984, 1985, 1986
  - Mikey Sheehy of Kerry: 1975, 1978, 1979, 1980, 1981, 1984, 1985, 1986
  - Denis "Ógie" Moran of Kerry: 1975, 1978, 1979, 1980, 1981, 1984, 1985, 1986
  - Ger Power of Kerry: 1975, 1978, 1979, 1980, 1981, 1984, 1985, 1986
  - Philly McMahon of Dublin: 2011, 2013, 2015, 2016, 2017, 2018, 2019, 2020
  - Kevin McManamon of Dublin: 2011, 2013, 2015, 2016, 2017, 2018, 2019, 2020
  - Cian O'Sullivan of Dublin: 2011, 2013, 2015, 2016, 2017, 2018, 2019, 2020
  - Michael Darragh MacAuley of Dublin: 2011, 2013, 2015, 2016, 2017, 2018, 2019, 2020
- These players have won seven All-Ireland medals both on the field of play and as substitutes:
  - Eoghan O'Gara of Dublin: 2011, 2013, 2015, 2016, 2017, 2018, 2019
  - Darren Daly of Dublin: 2011, 2013, 2015, 2016, 2017, 2018, 2019
  - Bernard Brogan Jr. of Dublin: 2011, 2013, 2015, 2016, 2017, 2018, 2019
  - Jonny Cooper of Dublin: 2013, 2015, 2016, 2017, 2018, 2019, 2020
  - Dan O'Keeffe of Kerry: 1931, 1932, 1937, 1939, 1940, 1941, 1946
  - Jack O'Shea of Kerry: 1978, 1979, 1980, 1981, 1984, 1985, 1986
  - Eoin Liston of Kerry: 1978, 1979, 1980, 1981, 1984, 1985, 1986
  - Brian Fenton of Dublin: 2015, 2016, 2017, 2018, 2019, 2020, 2023

==== Individual scoring ====
Cillian O'Connor's four goals (accompanied by nine points) in the 2020 All-Ireland Senior Football Championship semi-final at Croke Park broke the 5–3 record set by Johnny Joyce of Dublin in 1960 and matched with 3–9 by Rory Gallagher of Fermanagh in 2002 and O'Connor himself having scored 3-9 vs Limerick in 2018 for the highest individual scorer in any championship football match.

== Team results table ==
This section represents in colour-coded tabular format the results of GAA county teams in the All-Ireland Senior Football Championship since 2001.

Prior to 2001, counties played in separate provincial championships, with only four provincial champions coming together in the All-Ireland semi-finals, and it is difficult to directly compare results across counties. Since 2001, beaten teams from the provincial championships play together in the All-Ireland qualifier series.

However, it must be remembered that counties from the smaller provinces (Connacht with seven county teams and Munster with six) have a slight advantage over those from the larger provinces (Leinster with eleven county teams and Ulster with nine). Under the 2001–19 system they received a bye to the provincial semi-final and thus entered the second round of the qualifiers without winning a game, while counties from the larger provinces have to defeat one or even two opponents to reach the provincial semi-final. In the modern (2023) system a team from a small province can reach the provincial final after winning 1 game, qualifying directly for the All-Ireland group stages, while a team from a large province may need to win 3 games to reach the provincial final.

The old single knockout format was reintroduced in 2020 and 2021 due to the COVID-19 pandemic.

In 2022 a new competition was introduced, the Tailteann Cup, for teams that finished 17th–32nd in the National Football League and that did not reach their provincial final. These teams go straight into the Tailteann Cup and do not progress to the qualifiers.

=== Legend ===
Used in all seasons

- ♦ — provincial champions
- Ch — All-Ireland champions
- RU — Runners-up (2nd place)
- SF — All-Ireland semi-finals (3rd–4th place)

2023–present

- QF — All-Ireland quarter-finals (5th–8th place)
- PQF — All-Ireland preliminary quarter-finals (9th–12th place)
- AIgs — All-Ireland group stage (13th–16th place)
- TCx — Tailteann Cup top 4 (17th–20th place)
- TCx — Tailteann Cup, other place (21st–33rd place)

2022

- q2 — All-Ireland qualifiers, round 2 (9th–12th place)
- q1 — All-Ireland qualifiers, round 1 (13th–16th place)

2020–21

These are the colour-codes used for 2020 and 2021. X stands for the first letter of the province, e.g. Lpr is Leinster preliminary round, Cf is Connacht final.

- Xf — Provincial finalists (5th–8th place); Galway in 2020 are not counted as provincial finalists as they did not win any games prior
- Xsf — teams that won two provincial games before being eliminated (9th place)
- Xsf Xqf — teams that won one provincial game before being eliminated (8th–16th place)
- Xqr Xqf Xsf Cf — teams that lost their only game (16th–31st place)

2018–19

- S8 — All-Ireland "Super 8" quarter-final groups (5th–8th place)
- q4 — All-Ireland qualifiers, round 4 (9th–12th place)
- q3 — All-Ireland qualifiers, round 3 (13th–16th place)
- q2 — All-Ireland qualifiers, round 2 (17th–24th place)
- q1 — All-Ireland qualifiers, round 1 (25th–32nd place)

2001–17

Quarter-finals were played as single matches between 2001 and 2017.

- QF — All-Ireland quarter-finals (5th–8th place)

In 2007 and 2008, teams from Division 4 of the National Football League did not get to play in the qualifiers, instead going straight into the Tommy Murphy Cup, a secondary competition. In those years, there were only three rounds of qualifiers.

- qr3 — All-Ireland qualifiers, round 3 (9th–12th place)
- qr2 — All-Ireland qualifiers, round 2 (13th–16th place)
- qr1 — All-Ireland qualifiers, round 1 (17th–24th place)
- Cqf, Cqr — Connacht quarter-final or preliminary round (New York did not compete in the qualifiers)
- TM1 — Tommy Murphy Cup winners (25th place)
- TM2 — Tommy Murphy Cup finalists (26th place)
- TMsf — Tommy Murphy Cup semi-finalists (27th–28th place)
- TMqf — Tommy Murphy Cup quarter-finalists (29th–32nd place)

=== Table ===
County	′01	′02	′03	′04	′05	′06	′07	′08	′09	′10	′11	′12	′13	′14	′15	′16	′17	′18	′19	′20	′21	′22	′23	′24	′25	′26
Connacht
Galway	Ch	QF♦	QF♦	q3	QF♦	q4	qr3	QF♦	q4	q2	q2	q2	q4	QF	q4	QF♦	QF	SF♦	q4	Cf	Cf	RU♦	PQF♦	RU♦	QF♦	QF
Leitrim	q1	q2	q2	q2	q2	q2	qr1	TMsf	q1	q2	q2	q3	q2	q1	q1	q2	q2	q3	q2	Cqf	Csf	TCqf	TCgs	TCpqf	TCgs	TCr3
Mayo	q4	QF	q4	RU♦	QF	RU♦	qr2	qr3	QF♦	q1	SF♦	RU♦	RU♦	SF♦	SF♦	RU	RU	q3	SF	RU♦	RU♦	QF	QF	PQF	AIgs	Ch
Roscommon	QF♦	q2	QF	q4	q2	q2	qr1	qr1	q3	QF♦	q4	q2	q2	q3	q3	q4	QF♦	S8	S8♦	Csf	Csf	qr2	PQF	QF	AIgs	R2B♦
Sligo	q4	QF	q2	q1	q4	q3	QF♦	TMqf	q3	q4	q1	q4	q1	q4	q4	q3	q2	q2	q2	—	Cqf	TCsf	AIgs	TCsf	TCqf	TCqf
London	q1	q1	q1	q1	q1	q1	TMqf	TMsf	q1	q1	q2	q1	q4	q1	q1	q1	q1	q1	q1	—	—	TCr1	TCgs	TCpqf	TCgs	TCr3
New York	Cqf	Cqf	Cqf	Cqf	Cqf	Cqf	Cqf	Cqf	Cqf	Cqf	Cqf	Cqf	Cqf	Cqf	Cqf	Cpr	Cpr	Cqf	Cqf	—	—	TCqf	TCpqf	TCpqf	TCpqf	TCpqf
Leinster
Carlow	q2	q1	q2	q1	q2	q1	TMqf	TMqf	q1	q1	q2	q1	q1	q2	q1	q2	q3	q2	q1	Lpr	Lpr	TCqf	TCqf	TCgs	TCpqf	TCr2
Dublin	QF	SF♦	q3	QF	QF♦	SF♦	SF♦	QF♦	QF♦	SF	Ch♦	SF♦	Ch♦	SF♦	Ch♦	Ch♦	Ch♦	Ch♦	Ch♦	Ch♦	SF♦	SF♦	Ch♦	QF♦	QF	SF
Kildare	q3	q4	q4	q1	q2	q2	qr2	QF	QF	SF	QF	QF	q3	q4	QF	q3	q4	S8	q3	Lsf	Lf	qr2	PQF	TCqf	TC1	R2B
Laois	q3	q3	QF♦	q4	QF	QF	qr3	qr2	q2	q1	q2	QF	q4	q3	q1	q2	q2	q4	q4	Lsf	Lqf	TCr1	TCsf	TC2	TCpqf	TCqf
Longford	q1	q2	q1	q3	q1	q4	qr1	qr1	q2	q1	q2	q2	q2	q2	q3	q3	q2	q2	q2	Lqf	Lqf	TCr1	TCpqf	TCgs	TCgs	TCr3
Louth	q3	q2	q1	q2	q3	q1	qr3	qr1	q1	q4	q1	q1	q2	q1	q2	q1	q1	q2	q1	Lpr	Lpr	qr1	AIgs	QF	PQF♦	SF
Meath	RU♦	q4	q3	q2	q3	q3	SF	qr1	SF	QF♦	q3	q4	q4	q4	q2	q2	q3	q1	S8	Lf	Lsf	qr1	TC1	AIgs	SF	R3
Offaly	q2	q2	q3	q2	q1	q4	TMqf	qr1	q1	q3	q2	q1	q1	q1	q2	q2	q1	q2	q3	Lqf	Lqf	TCsf	TCpqf	TCgs	TCqf	TC2
Westmeath	QF	q2	q1	QF♦	q2	QF	qr2	qr2	q2	q2	q1	q2	q1	q1	q4	q4	q2	q1	q3	Lqf	Lsf	TC1	AIgs	AIgs	TCqf	R3♦
Wexford	q1	q1	q1	q3	q2	q3	qr1	SF	q2	q3	q4	q2	q3	q2	q2	q1	q2	q1	q1	Lpr	Lqf	TCpr	TCqf	TCgs	TCqf	TCqf
Wicklow	q2	q2	q1	q1	q1	q1	TM1	TM2	q4	q1	q2	q2	q1	q2	q1	q1	q1	q1	q1	Lqf	Lpr	TCr1	TCgs	TCqf	TCsf	TC1
Munster
Clare	q2	q2	q2	q2	q3	q2	TMsf	TMqf	q2	q1	q1	q4	q2	q3	q2	QF	q3	q3	q4	Mqf	Mqf	QF	AIgs	AIgs	AIgs	TCr2
Cork	q4	SF♦	q1	q3	SF	SF♦	RU	SF♦	RU♦	Ch	QF	SF♦	QF	QF	q4	q4	q4	q4	S8	Mf	Mf	QF	QF	PQF	PQF	QF
Kerry	SF♦	RU	SF♦	Ch♦	RU♦	Ch	Ch♦	RU	Ch	QF♦	RU♦	QF	SF♦	Ch♦	RU♦	SF♦	SF♦	S8♦	RU♦	Msf	SF♦	Ch♦	RU♦	SF♦	Ch♦	RU♦
Limerick	q2	q3	q4	q4	q3	q2	qr1	qr2	q4	q4	QF	q3	q1	q3	q1	q2	q1	q1	q2	Msf	Msf	qr2	TCqf	TCqf	TC2	TCr2
Tipperary	q1	q4	q3	q1	q1	q2	TMqf	qr1	q2	q2	q1	q4	q1	q4	q3	SF	q3	q2	q1	SF♦	Msf	TCr1	TCgs	TCpqf	TCgs	TCr3
Waterford	q1	q1	q1	q2	q1	q1	TMsf	TMqf	q1	q2	q3	q1	q2	q1	q1	q1	q1	q2	q1	Mqf	Mqf	TCpr	TCgs	TCgs	TCgs	TCr2
Ulster
Antrim	q2	q1	q2	q1	q1	q1	TM2	TM1	q4	q1	q3	q3	q1	q2	q2	q1	q1	q1	q2	Uqf	Uqf	TCr1	TCsf	TCsf	TCpqf	TCqf
Armagh	q3	Ch♦	RU	QF♦	SF♦	QF♦	qr1	QF♦	q1	q3	q3	q1	q3	QF	q2	q1	QF	q4	q3	Usf	Usf	QF	QF	Ch	QF	R3♦
Cavan	q4	q1	q2	q2	q4	q1	qr1	qr1	q2	q2	q1	q2	QF	q2	q2	q3	q2	q3	q4	SF♦	Uqf	TC2	TCqf	AIgs	PQF	R2B
Derry	SF	q3	q2	SF	q4	q3	QF	qr1	q3	q3	q4	q1	q3	q1	q3	q4	q2	q1	q2	Uqf	Uqf	SF♦	SF♦	QF	AIgs	R2B
Donegal	q2	QF	SF	q4	q2	QF	qr3	qr2	QF	q1	SF♦	Ch♦	QF	RU♦	QF	QF	q4	S8♦	S8♦	Uf	Usf	qr2	PQF	SF♦	RU♦	R3
Down	q1	q1	q4	q2	q2	q1	qr1	qr3	q3	RU	q4	QF	q2	q2	q1	q1	q4	q2	q2	Usf	Upr	TCr1	TC2	TC1	PQF	TCsf
Fermanagh	q1	q3	QF	SF	q1	q4	qr2	qr3	q1	q2	q1	q1	q2	q1	QF	q2	q1	q4	q1	Uqf	Uqf	TCqf	TCpqf	TCqf	TCsf	TCsf
Monaghan	q2	q1	q2	q1	q4	q2	QF	qr3	q2	q4	q1	q2	QF♦	QF	QF♦	q2	QF	SF	q2	Upr	Uf	qr1	SF	PQF	QF	QF
Tyrone	QF♦	q4	Ch♦	QF	Ch	q2	QF♦	Ch	SF♦	QF♦	QF	q3	SF	q2	SF	QF♦	SF♦	RU	SF	Uqf	Ch♦	qr1	QF	PQF	SF	QF

== See also ==
- All-Ireland Senior Football Championship
- All-Ireland Senior Hurling Championship records and statistics
