= 1900 All-Ireland Senior Football Championship final =

- Event: 1900 All-Ireland Senior Football Championship
Tipperary	London
3–7 (16)	0–2 (2)
- Date: 26 October 1900
- Venue: Jones' Road, Dublin
- Referee: T. H. Redmond
- Attendance: 2,000

The 1900 All-Ireland Senior Football Championship final was the thirteenth All-Ireland Final and the deciding match of the 1900 All-Ireland Senior Football Championship, an inter-county Gaelic football tournament for the top teams in Ireland.

== Match ==
=== Summary ===
Tipperary were the winners in a very one-sided final, in which they beat London by 3–7 to 0–2.

It was Tipperary's third All-Ireland SFC title, following success in 1889 and 1895.

=== Details ===
26 October 1902

Tipperary	3–7 – 0–2	London

Jones's Road, Dublin
Attendance: 2,000
Referee: T. Redmond
