= 1889 All-Ireland Senior Football Championship final =

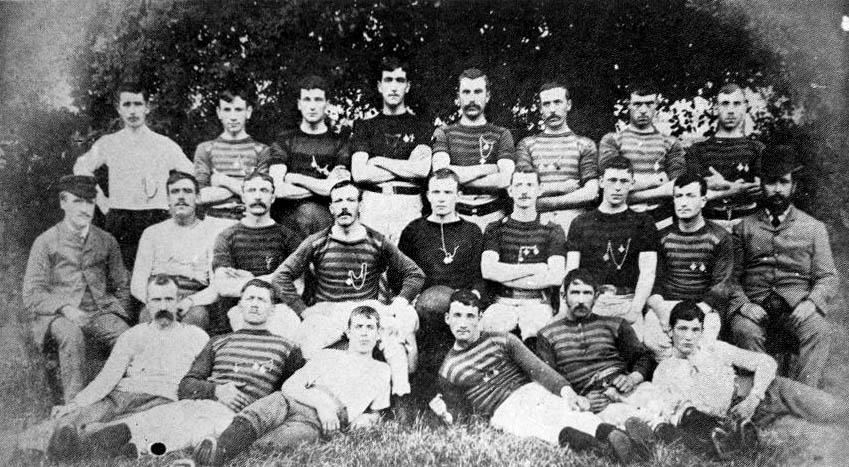
- Tipperary, champions
- Event: 1889 All-Ireland Senior Football Championship
| Tipperary | Laois |
| 3–6 (15) | 0–0 (0) |
- Date: 20 October 1889
- Venue: Inchicore, Dublin
- Referee: T. O'Driscoll
- Attendance: 1,500

The 1889 All-Ireland Senior Football Championship final was the second All-Ireland Final and the culmination of the 1889 All-Ireland Senior Football Championship, an inter-county Gaelic football tournament for the top teams in Ireland. Tipperary were the winners.

The Laois (Queens County) team that lost to Tipperary were from the Portlaoise club. They are the only team in history not to get a single score in an All–Ireland football final.

It was Tipperary's first All-Ireland SFC title: they would win three more in 1895, 1900 and 1920. Football has since declined in the county, with hurling becoming more prominent.
