= 1895 All-Ireland Senior Football Championship final =

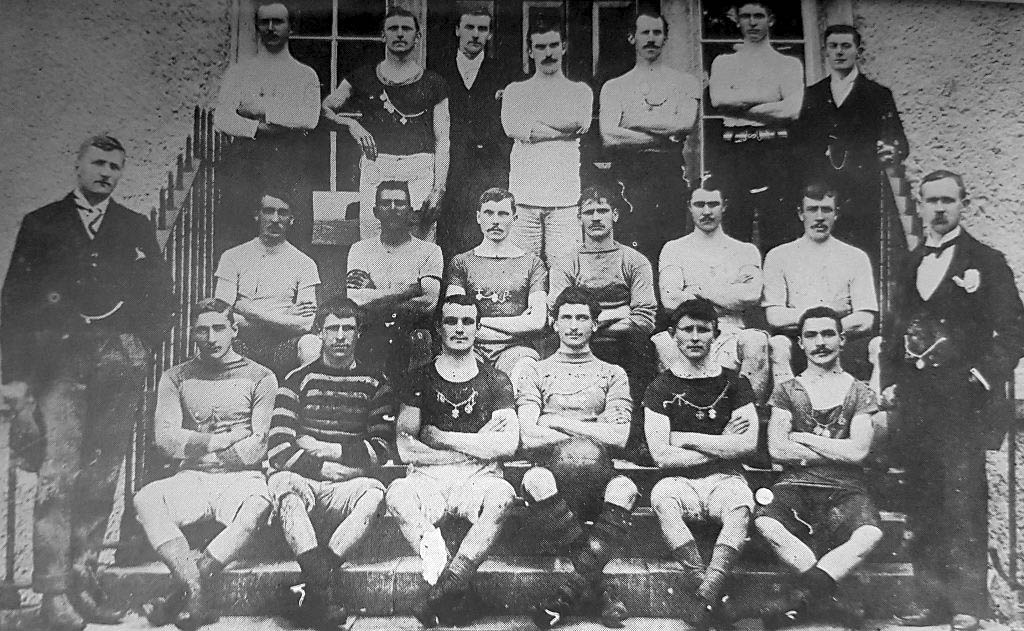
- Tipperary, champions
- Event: 1895 All-Ireland Senior Football Championship
Tipperary	Meath
0–4	0–3
- Date: 15 March 1896
- Venue: Jones' Road, Dublin
- Referee: J. J. Kenny (Dublin)
- Attendance: 8,000

The 1895 All-Ireland Senior Football Championship final was the eighth All-Ireland Final and the deciding match of the 1895 All-Ireland Senior Football Championship. It was played at the City and Suburban Grounds, Jones Road, Dublin between Tipperary and Meath on Sunday 15 March 1896.

It was the opening game on the day which also saw Tipperary defeat Kilkenny in the All-Ireland Hurling Final.

Tipperary won the game by 0-4 to 0-3.

== Match ==
=== Summary ===
As counties were represented in that era by their champion clubs, Tipperary was represented by Arravale Rovers while Pierce O'Mahony's club from Navan played for Meath. Tipp won, with all four of its points scored by Willie Ryan. The referee later admitted that he should have not awarded one of Tipperary's points, but Meath sportingly did not ask for a replay.

It was Tipperary's second All-Ireland SFC title, following success in 1889.

=== Details ===
15 March 1896
1:00pm

Tipperary	0-4 – 0-3	Meath

Jones's Road, Dublin
Attendance: 8,000
Referee: J.J. Kenny (Dublin)

Tipperary
Paddy Finn (c)
Willie Ryan (goal.)
R Quane
J Riordan
M Finn
P Glasheen
M ("Terry") McInerney
J Carew
M Conroy
J Carey
D Butler
W P Ryan
J Heffernan
P Daly
J O’Brien
B Finn
P Dwyer

Meath
M Murray (c)
H Pendleton (goal.)
P Clarke
J Hegarty
J Russell
J W Toombe
J A Shaw
M McCabe
P Fox
J Elliott
M Rogers
C Curtis
J Sharkey
P Daly
J Quinn
V McDermott
J Fitzpatrick
