= All-Ireland Senior Football Championship =

Men's Gaelic football inter-county competition

- Current season or competition: 2026 All-Ireland Senior Football Championship
- Logo
- Irish: Craobh Shinsir Peile na hÉireann
- Code: Gaelic football
- Founded: 1887; 139 years ago
- Region: Ireland (32 Teams); England (1 team); United States (1 team) (GAA)
- Trophy: Sam Maguire Cup
- No. of teams: 34
- Title holders: Mayo (4th title)
- Most titles: Kerry (39 titles)
- Sponsors: SuperValu; Allied Irish Bank; Allianz
- TV partner(s): RTÉ, BBC Northern Ireland, Premier Sports, TG4
- Official website: gaa.ie/gaa-football-championship

The All-Ireland Senior Football Championship (SFC) (Irish: Craobh Shinsir Peile na hÉireann) is the premier inter-county competition in Gaelic football. County teams compete against each other and the winner is declared All-Ireland Champions.

Organised by the Gaelic Athletic Association (GAA), the championship has been contested every year except one since 1888.

The final is played by the 35th Sunday of the year at Croke Park in Dublin, with the winning team receiving the Sam Maguire Cup. For the majority of its existence, the All-Ireland Championship has been played on a straight knockout basis whereby once a team loses they are eliminated from the championship. In more recent years, the qualification procedures for the championship have changed several times. Currently, qualification is limited to teams competing in six feeder competitions: the finalists of the four provincial championships (Connacht, Leinster, Munster and Ulster), the Tailteann Cup holders and the best non-qualified National Football League teams entering the 16-team group stage.

Thirty-three teams currently participate in the All-Ireland Championship, with Kerry, Dublin, Galway and Cavan being the most successful teams in their respective provinces.

The title has been won by 19 counties, 18 of which have won the title more than once. The all-time record-holders are Kerry, who have won the championship on 39 occasions. The current title holders (2026) are Mayo who defeated Kerry 1–20 to 1–17 at Croke Park on 26 July 2026.

== History ==
The first Championship to be held featured club teams who represented their respective counties after their county championship. The 21 a-side final was between Commercials of Limerick and Young Irelands of Louth. The final was played in Beech Hill, Donnybrook (not Bird Avenue) on 29 April 1888 with Commercials winning by 1–4 to 0–3. Unlike later All-Ireland competitions, there were no provincial championships, and the result was an open draw.

The second Championship was unfinished owing to the American Invasion Tour. The 1888 provincial championships had been completed (Tipperary, Kilkenny and Monaghan winning them; no Connacht teams entered) but after the Invasion tour returned, the All-Ireland semi-final and final were not played. English team London reached the final four times in the early years of the competition (1900–1903).

In 1892, inter-county teams were introduced to the All-Ireland Championship. Congress granted permission for the winning club to use players from other clubs in the county, thus the inter-county teams came into being. The rules of hurling and football were also altered: goals were made equal to five points, and teams were reduced from 21 to 17 a-side.

The 1903 Championship brought Kerry's first All-Ireland title. They went on to become the most successful football team in the history of the All-Ireland Senior Football Championship.

Unlike in other European countries, such as neighbouring England, where annual sports events were cancelled during the twentieth century due to the First and Second World Wars, the All-Ireland Championship has been running continuously since 1887, with the final running since 1889 (the 1888 competition was played but no final was held due to the Invasion mentioned above). The competition continued even in spite of the effects on the country of the Civil War and the Second World War (the National Football League was not held during the latter). In 1941, the All-Ireland Championship was disrupted by an outbreak of foot-and-mouth disease but the postponed Leinster final were later rescheduled.

The duration of certain championship matches increased from 60 to 80 minutes during the 1970s. They were settled at 70 minutes after five seasons of this in 1975. This applied only to the provincial finals, All-Ireland semi-finals and finals.

The first half of the twentieth century brought the rise of several teams who won two or more All-Ireland titles in that period, such as Kildare, Mayo, Cavan, Wexford and Roscommon. In the 1990s, a significant sea change took place, as the All-Ireland was claimed by an Ulster team in four consecutive years (1991–1994). Since then Ulster has produced more All-Ireland winning teams than any other province.

The All-Ireland Qualifiers were introduced in 2001. Later that year, the 2001 final brought victory for Galway who became the first football team to win an All-Ireland by springing through "the back door." In 2013, Hawk-Eye was introduced for Championship matches at Croke Park. It was first used to confirm that Offaly substitute Peter Cunningham's attempted point had gone wide 10 minutes into the second half of a game against Kildare. 2013 also brought the first Friday night game in the history of the Championship – a first round qualifier between Carlow and Laois.

In recent years further changes have been made to the structure of the championship. In 2018 the Super 8s were introduced, where the four provincial champions and the four-round 4 qualifier winners would be split into two groups of four teams. Each team plays their group rivals once, with the top two teams progressing to the All-Ireland Semi-Finals. In 2022 a two-tier format was adopted for the championship. Division 3 and 4 teams from the National Football League that fail to reach a provincial final will not proceed to the All-Ireland qualifiers and will instead play in the Tailteann Cup.

=== Format history ===
==== Historic format (1888–2000) ====
For the first All-Ireland championship in 1887, the competition was played on an open draw knockout basis. From 1888, the provincial system was introduced, whereby the counties in each of Ireland's four provinces would play each other on a knockout basis to find provincial champions. These four champions would meet in the All-Ireland semi-finals. The structure outlined above was adopted in 2001 to allow more games to be played, but still retain provincial championships and the knockout structure, resulting in every game continuing to be a meaningful fixture, with no dead-rubber league format matches being played out.

==== Quarter-finals format (2001–2017) ====
From 2001 to 2017, the Championship was played using the Quarter-finals format. Under this format, Provincial matches would take place during the months of May, June and July. The winners of each of the four Provincial Championships would earn a place in the All-Ireland Quarter-Finals, which would take place in the month of August. Replays would be played for all drawn matches, not just drawn Provincial Finals and drawn All-Ireland Finals. Extra-time would only be used for Replays and Qualifier Matches. If the teams were still level after extra time, the qualifier match would go to a replay or in the case of replays, another replay would take place.

The qualifiers series (also referred to as the "back door") for teams that did not win their provincial championships would take place in the months of June and July with the winning four teams of Round 4 playing the four Provincial Champions in the All-Ireland Quarter Finals.

- All-Ireland Quarter-Finals: The four Provincial Champions would be drawn against the winning four teams from Round 4 of the All-Ireland Qualifiers. If a match finished with both teams level, a replay would take place. The four winning teams qualify for the All-Ireland Semi-Finals.
- All-Ireland Semi-Finals: The All-Ireland Semi-Finals would take place in August and be contested by the four winners of the All-Ireland Quarter Finals. If a match ended with both teams level, a replay would take place. The two winning teams qualify for the All-Ireland Final.
- All-Ireland Final: The two remaining teams would meet in the All-Ireland Final, usually on the third Sunday in September. The winning team is crowned All-Ireland Champions.

==== Single-tier championship format (2018–2019) ====
This championship was identical to the format above, though with no second-tier championship all teams who failed to win their provincial final were eligible to play in the qualifiers. The qualifiers took place over four rounds rather than two, and the four winners of the fourth round proceeded to the All-Ireland Super 8s. As in the format above, the further a team progressed in their provincial championships the later the round they entered the qualifiers. The All-Ireland Super 8s were a round-robin group stage, featuring four teams placed into two groups. The two-highest ranked teams from each group were drawn into an All-Ireland Semi-final, which was followed by the All-Ireland Final.

==== Return to single-elimination format (2020–2022) ====
Due to the impact of the COVID-19 pandemic, the 2020 and 2021 championships returned to the historic single-elimination format. Teams that were eliminated in their provincial championships did not access the qualifiers, which were cancelled, and the "Super 8's" were removed in favour of a straight-knockout semi-final and final. In 2022 a smaller back door system took place then Knockout (2001–2017) or Super 8 (2018–2019) there was a knock out Tailteann Cup in 2022 as well.

==== Integration with the league and Tailteann Cup (2023–) ====
In 2023, the format of the championship was again altered. Under this system, approved at a Special Congress of the GAA in February 2022, the results in the National Football League (held in January through to March of each year) would have an impact on counties' progression in the championship. After the conclusion of the four provincial championships, whose structures remain unaltered, there would be a round-robin competition for 16 teams, split evenly into four. The groups would be made up of the four provincial champions and four runners-up, joined by a further eight teams based on their overall ranking from the league. The four group winners would automatically qualify for the All-Ireland Quarter Finals, and the four remaining spots in the quarter-finals are determined by playoff-matches between the second and third placed teams. The quarter finals, semi-finals and final are then played under the traditional single-elimination format. Furthermore, the 16 teams that fail to qualify for the round-robin stage would compete in the second-tier Tailteann Cup, which is also played via round-robin groups and single-elimination finals.

==== 2026 reformat ====
A new format for the 2026 All-Ireland series and beyond was approved at a GAA Central Council meeting in Donegal on February 22, 2025.

The format, inspired by systems previously used in 16-team county championships, emerged as the most favoured option and was seen as a way to reduce fixture congestion and provide a clearer break between the League and Championship seasons. It removes the group stage and replaces it with a double-elimination format as follows:

- 16 teams qualify, namely the eight provincial finalists, the previous year's Tailteann Cup winner, and the top seven teams from that year's edition of the NFL which did not reach a provincial final
  - Should the Tailteann Cup winner qualify for a provincial final or through league position, their automatic berth will transfer to the eighth-best team in the aggregate NFL table
- Eight matches will be played in Round 1, with provincial finalists enjoying home advantage
- Winners from Round 1 will play each other in Round 2A, while losers will play each other in Round 2B
- Winners from Round 2A advance direct to the All-Ireland quarter-finals; losers from Round 2A will play Round 2B winners to decide the remaining quarter-final places

== Format ==
=== Counties ===
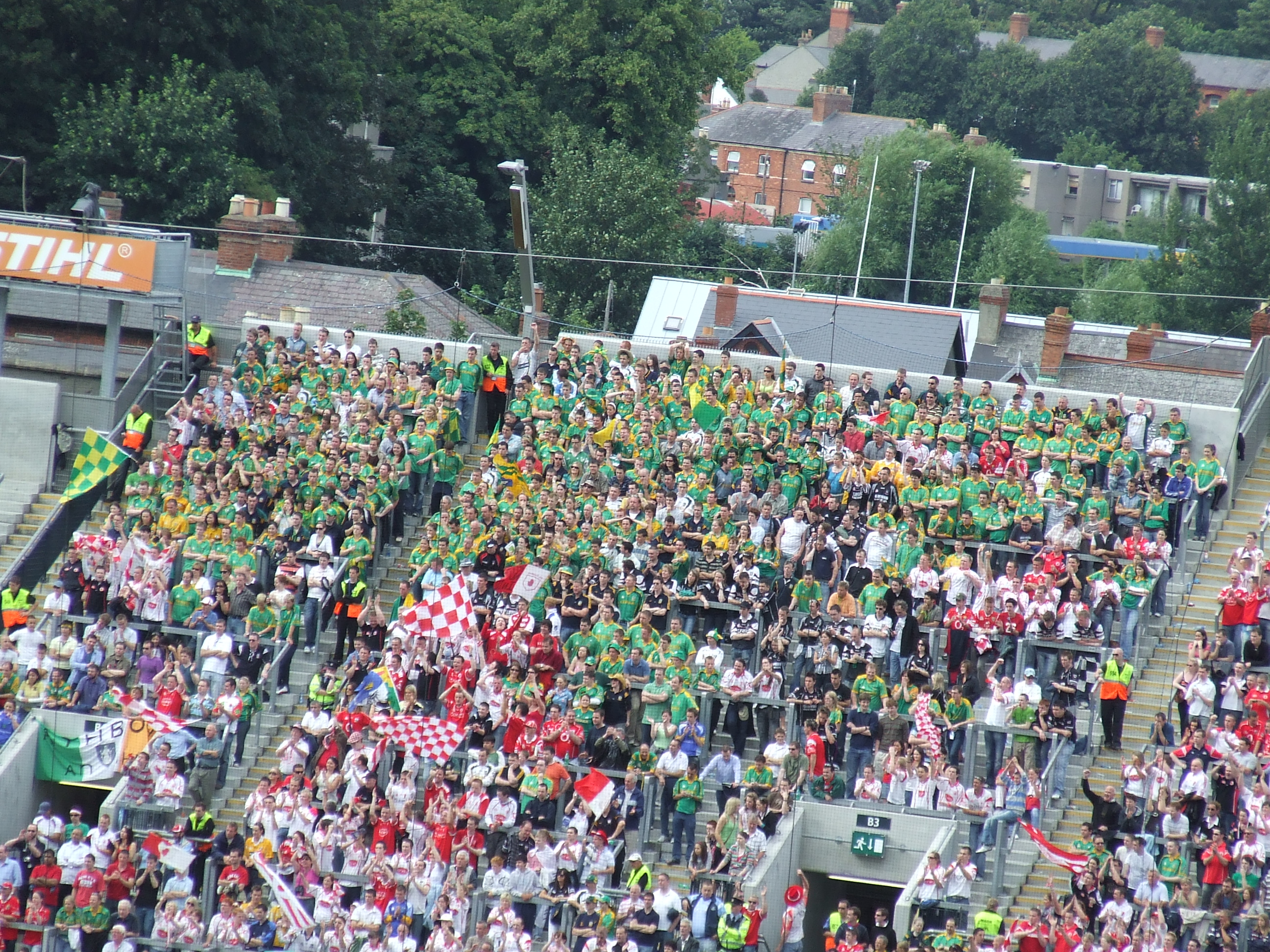
Fans of Sligo (in black) are visible in the crowd among supporters of Cork, Meath and Tyrone. The introduction of the All-Ireland Qualifiers in 2001 provided weaker counties with opportunities to play big games at Croke Park.

The county is a geographical region in Ireland, and each of the thirty-two counties in Ireland organise their own Gaelic games affairs through a County Board. The county teams play in their respective Provincial Championships (reflective of the four Irish provinces) in Connacht (which also includes teams from London and New York), Leinster, Munster, and Ulster. Kilkenny is currently unique among the 32 Irish county associations in not participating in the All-Ireland Senior Football Championship. The Provincial Championships operate through a knock-out cup competition format.

=== Provincial championships ===
==== Connacht Championship (Seven teams) ====
Quarter-finals (3 matches): Due to London and New York's participation in this round two counties' fixtures are already known; each of the Connacht counties play abroad on a five-year rotation. The remaining three teams are drawn; the first two play each other while the third receives a bye.

Semi-finals (2 matches): The winners of the three quarter-finals join the other team to make up the semi-final pairings. Two teams are eliminated at this stage while the winners advance to the final and qualify for the All-Ireland knockout stage.

Final (1 match): The winners of the two semi-finals contest this game. The Connacht champions and runners-up advance directly to the All-Ireland knockout stage and will play at home in the first round.

==== Leinster Championship (Eleven teams) ====
Preliminary round (3 matches): These are three matches between the first six teams drawn – the previous season's semi-finalists and one team at random receive byes. Three teams are eliminated at this stage while the winners advance to the quarter-finals.

Quarter-finals (4 matches): The previous year's semi-finalists are drawn against either a preliminary round winner or the county which received a bye. Four teams are eliminated at this stage while the winners advance to the semi-finals.

Semi-finals (2 matches): The winners of the four quarter-finals make up the semi-final pairings. Two teams are eliminated at this stage while the winners advance to the final and qualify for the All-Ireland knockout stage.

Final (1 match): The winners of the two semi-finals contest this game. The Leinster champions and runners-up advance directly to the All-Ireland knockout stage and play at home in the first round.

==== Munster Championship (Six teams) ====
Quarter-finals (2 matches): These are two matches between the first four teams drawn – the other two teams receive a bye. Two teams are eliminated at this stage while the winners advance to the semi-finals.

Semi-finals (2 matches): The winners of the two quarter-finals join the other two teams to make up the semi-final pairings. Two teams are eliminated at this stage while the winners advance to the final and qualify for the All-Ireland knockout stage.

Final (1 match): The winners of the two semi-finals contest this game. The Munster champions and runners-up advance to the All-Ireland knockout stage and are guaranteed a home tie in the first round.

==== Ulster Championship (Nine teams) ====
Preliminary round (1 match): This is one match between the first two eligible teams drawn – the other seven teams receive a bye. One team is eliminated at this stage while the winners advance to the quarter-finals. Teams who play in the preliminary round are automatically given a bye to the quarter-finals for the following two seasons.

Quarter-finals (4 matches): The winners of the preliminary round join the other seven teams to make up the quarter-final pairings. Four teams are eliminated at this stage while the winners advance to the semi-finals.

Semi-finals (2 matches): The winners of the four quarter-finals make up the semi-final pairings. Two teams are eliminated at this stage while the winners advance to the final and qualify for the All-Ireland knockout stage.

Final (1 match): The winners of the two semi-finals contest this game. The Ulster champions and runners-up receive home advantage in the All-Ireland knockout stage.

=== All-Ireland Senior Football Championship playoffs ===
==== First round (Sixteen teams remaining) ====
The 8 provincial finalists, the Tailteann Cup holders and the next 7 highest ranked counties in the National Football League enter the first round. (The eighth-highest ranked team in the NFL rankings will also qualify should the Tailteann Cup holders qualify either through reaching their provincial final or through league position). Teams are placed in two different pots and drawn into eight ties; the provincial finalists are placed in one pot and the league/Tailteann qualifiers in another. Eight matches are played with provincial finalists enjoying home advantage.

==== Round 2A ====
Round 2A (4 matches): Winners of the first-round ties play each other in this round. Fixtures are determined by an open draw with the first team picked playing at home. Ties can be re-drawn if one or more fixtures are rematches of games played in a provincial final. Winners of Round 2A matches advance direct to the quarter-finals while losers get a second chance in Round 3.

==== Round 2B ====
Round 2B (4 matches): Losers of the first-round ties play each other in this round, with fixtures determined as in Round 2A. Winners of Round 2B ties play the losers of Round 2A ties in Round 3; losers in Round 2B are eliminated from the competition.

==== Round 3 ====
Round 3 (4 matches): Winners of Round 2B ties play losers of Round 2A ties in this round. The open draw continues in this round but ties are also re-drawn if a fixture is a rematch of a first-round tie as well. Winners advance to the quarter-finals while losers are eliminated.

==== Quarter-finals (Eight teams remaining) ====
Quarter-finals (4 matches): Winners from Round 2A are joined by winners from Round 3. Rematches from previous rounds are avoided where possible. Four teams are eliminated at this stage while the winners advance to the semi-finals.

==== Semi-finals (Four teams remaining) ====
Semi-finals (2 matches): The winners of the quarter-finals make up the semi-final pairings. As before, rematches from prior rounds are avoided if possible. Two teams are eliminated at this stage while the winners advance to the final.

==== Final ====
Final (1 match): The two winners of the semi-finals contest this game. The winning team are declared All-Ireland champions.

== Teams ==
=== 2026 Championship ===
Thirty-three counties competed in the 2026 All-Ireland Senior Football Championship: seven teams in the Connacht Senior Football Championship, eleven teams in the Leinster Senior Football Championship, six teams in the Munster Senior Football Championship and nine teams in the Ulster Senior Football Championship.

County	Location	Stadium	Province	Position in 2026 Championship	Current Championship	First year in championship	In championship since	Provincial Titles	Last Provincial Title	Championship Titles	Last Championship Title
Antrim	Belfast	Corrigan Park	Ulster	Tailteann Cup quarter-finals	Ulster Senior Football Championship	1890		10	1951	0	—
Armagh	Armagh	Athletic Grounds	Ulster	Round 3	Ulster Senior Football Championship	1890		15	2026	2	2024
Carlow	Carlow	Dr Cullen Park	Leinster	Tailteann Cup round 2	Leinster Senior Football Championship	1897		1	1944	0	—
Cavan	Cavan	Breffni Park	Ulster	Round 2	Ulster Senior Football Championship	1888		40	2020	5	1952
Clare	Ennis	Cusack Park	Munster	Tailteann Cup round 2	Munster Senior Football Championship	1887		2	1992	0	—
Cork	Cork	Páirc Uí Chaoimh	Munster	Quarter-finals	Munster Senior Football Championship	1887		37	2012	7	2010
Derry	Derry	Celtic Park	Ulster	Round 2	Ulster Senior Football Championship	1904		9	2023	1	1993
Donegal	Ballybofey	MacCumhaill Park	Ulster	Round 3	Ulster Senior Football Championship	1906		12	2025	2	2012
Down	Newry	Páirc Esler	Ulster	Tailteann Cup runners-up	Ulster Senior Football Championship	1904		12	1994	5	1994
Dublin	Donnycarney	Parnell Park	Leinster	Semi-finals	Leinster Senior Football Championship	1887		63	2024	31	2023
Fermanagh	Enniskillen	Brewster Park	Ulster	Tailteann Cup semi-finals	Ulster Senior Football Championship	1903		0	—	0	—
Galway	Galway	Pearse Stadium	Connacht	Quarter-finals	Connacht Senior Football Championship	1887		51	2025	9	2001
Kerry	Tralee	Austin Stack Park	Munster	Runners-up	Munster Senior Football Championship	1889		87	2026	39	2025
Kildare	Newbridge	St Conleth's Park	Leinster	Round 2	Leinster Senior Football Championship	1888		13	2000	4	1928
Laois	Portlaoise	O'Moore Park	Leinster	Tailteann Cup quarter-finals	Leinster Senior Football Championship	1888		6	2003	0	—
Leitrim	Carrick-on-Shannon	Páirc Seán Mac Diarmada	Connacht	Tailteann Cup round 3	Connacht Senior Football Championship	1906		2	1994	0	—
Limerick	Limerick	Gaelic Grounds	Munster	Tailteann Cup round 2	Munster Senior Football Championship	1887	1965	1	1896	2	1896
London	South Ruislip	McGovern Park	Britain	Tailteann Cup round 3	Connacht Senior Football Championship	1900	2022	0	—	0	—
Longford	Longford	Pearse Park	Leinster	Tailteann Cup round 3	Leinster Senior Football Championship	1903		1	1968	0	—
Louth	Drogheda	Drogheda Park	Leinster	Semi-finals	Leinster Senior Football Championship	1887		9	2025	3	1957
Mayo	Castlebar	MacHale Park	Connacht	Champions	Connacht Senior Football Championship	1901		48	2021	4	2026
Meath	Navan	Páirc Tailteann	Leinster	Round 3	Leinster Senior Football Championship	1887		21	2010	7	1999
Monaghan	Clones	St Tiernach's Park	Ulster	Quarter-finals	Ulster Senior Football Championship	1888		16	2015	0	—
New York	Bronx	Gaelic Park	North America	Tailteann Cup preliminary quarter-finals	Connacht Senior Football Championship	1999	2022	0	—	0	—
Offaly	Tullamore	O'Connor Park	Leinster	Tailteann Cup semi-finals	Leinster Senior Football Championship	1896		10	1997	3	1982
Roscommon	Roscommon	Dr Hyde Park	Connacht	Round 2	Connacht Senior Football Championship	1892		25	2026	2	1944
Sligo	Sligo	Markievicz Park	Connacht	Tailteann Cup quarter-finals	Connacht Senior Football Championship	1905	2021	3	2007	0	—
Tipperary	Thurles	Semple Stadium	Munster	Tailteann Cup round 3	Munster Senior Football Championship	1887		10	2020	4	1920
Tyrone	Omagh	Healy Park	Ulster	Quarter-finals	Ulster Senior Football Championship	1890		16	2021	4	2021
Waterford	Waterford	Walsh Park	Munster	Tailteann Cup round 3	Munster Senior Football Championship	1887		1	1898	0	—
Westmeath	Mullingar	Cusack Park	Leinster	Round 3	Leinster Senior Football Championship	1890		2	2026	0	—
Wexford	Wexford	Chadwicks Wexford Park	Leinster	Tailteann Cup quarter-finals	Leinster Senior Football Championship	1887		10	1945	5	1918
Wicklow	Aughrim	Aughrim County Ground	Leinster	Tailteann Cup champions	Leinster Senior Football Championship	1887		0	—	0	—

== Venues ==
Dublin	Thurles	Limerick	Killarney
Croke Park	Semple Stadium	Gaelic Grounds	Fitzgerald Stadium
53°21′38.70″N 6°15′4.80″W	52°40′55.91″N 7°49′30.40″W	52°40′12.50″N 8°39′15.10″W	52°3′58.75″N 9°30′28.56″W
Capacity: 82,300	Capacity: 45,690	Capacity: 44,023	Capacity: 38,000
Castlebar	Location of the top 10 GAA stadiums by capacity in Ireland.		Clones
MacHale Park	Location of the top 10 GAA stadiums by capacity in Ireland.		St Tiernach's Park
53°51′13.92″N 9°17′3.93″W	Location of the top 10 GAA stadiums by capacity in Ireland.		54°11′8.04″N 7°13′57.86″W
Capacity: 25,369	Location of the top 10 GAA stadiums by capacity in Ireland.		Capacity: 29,000
Galway	Cork	Kilkenny	Cavan
53°15′47.92″N 9°5′2.98″W	51°53′59.10″N 8°26′6.15″W	52°39′23.03″N 7°14′22.85″W	53°58′54.54″N 7°21′33.38″W
Pearse Stadium	Páirc Uí Chaoimh	Nowlan Park	Breffni Park
Capacity: 26,197	Capacity: 45,000	Capacity: 27,000	Capacity: 25,030

=== Stadia and locations ===
County	Location	Province	Stadium(s)	Capacity
N / A	Dublin	Leinster	Croke Park (neutral)	82,300
Antrim	Belfast	Ulster	Corrigan Park	3,700
Armagh	Armagh	Ulster	Athletic Grounds	18,500
Carlow	Carlow	Leinster	Dr Cullen Park	21,000
Cavan	Cavan	Ulster	Breffni Park	32,000
Clare	Ennis	Munster	Cusack Park	19,000
Cork	Cork	Munster	Páirc Uí Chaoimh	45,000
Derry	Derry	Ulster	Celtic Park	15,000
Donegal	Ballybofey	Ulster	MacCumhaill Park	18,000
Down	Newry	Ulster	Páirc Esler	20,000
Dublin	Donnycarney	Leinster	Parnell Park	8,500
Fermanagh	Enniskillen	Ulster	Brewster Park	20,000
Galway	Galway	Connacht	Pearse Stadium	26,197
Kerry	Killarney	Munster	Fitzgerald Stadium	38,000
Kildare	Newbridge	Leinster	St Conleth's Park	8,200
Kilkenny	Kilkenny	Leinster	Nowlan Park	27,000
Laois	Portlaoise	Leinster	O'Moore Park	27,000
Leitrim	Carrick-on-Shannon	Connacht	Páirc Seán Mac Diarmada	9,331
Limerick	Limerick	Munster	Gaelic Grounds	44,203
London	South Ruislip	Britain	McGovern Park	3,000
Longford	Longford	Leinster	Pearse Park	6,000
Louth	Drogheda	Leinster	Drogheda Park	3,500
Mayo	Castlebar	Connacht	MacHale Park	25,369
Meath	Navan	Leinster	Páirc Tailteann	11,000
Monaghan	Clones	Ulster	St Tiernach's Park	36,000
New York	Bronx	North America	Gaelic Park	2,000
Offaly	Tullamore	Leinster	O'Connor Park	20,000
Roscommon	Roscommon	Connacht	Dr Hyde Park	25,000
Sligo	Sligo	Connacht	Markievicz Park	18,558
Tipperary	Thurles	Munster	Semple Stadium	45,690
Tyrone	Omagh	Ulster	Healy Park	17,636
Waterford	Waterford	Munster	Fraher Field	15,000
Westmeath	Mullingar	Leinster	Cusack Park	11,000
Wexford	Wexford	Leinster	Chadwicks Wexford Park	20,000
Wicklow	Aughrim	Leinster	Aughrim County Ground	7,000

== List of finals ==
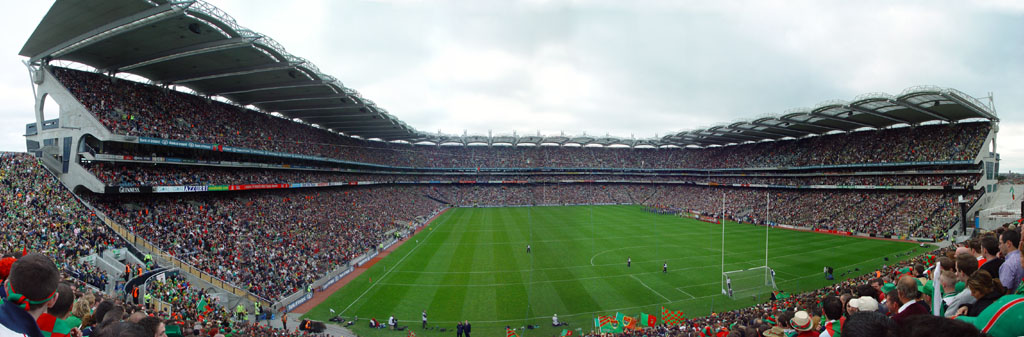
Croke Park kitted out in the green and red of Mayo fans at the 2004 All-Ireland Senior Football Championship Final.

Typically, over the four Sundays of September, All-Ireland Finals in men's football, ladies' football, hurling and camogie take place at Croke Park, the national stadium of the GAA. Two grades are played on each final day, the senior team and the minor team (consisting of younger players, under the age of 18, who have participated in that year's All-Ireland Minor Football Championship). Guests who attend these events include the President of Ireland, the Taoiseach and other important dignitaries. The football final is considered the pinnacle event of this period.

The final game of the All-Ireland Senior Football Championship historically took place on the third Sunday of September since the late 1920s. Since 2022, the final game is held on the third Sunday of July. The men's decider regularly attracts crowds of over 80,000. The winning team captain receives the Sam Maguire Cup. The current champions are Mayo.

Due to COVID-19 and the related State restrictions, the 2020 All-Ireland Senior Football Championship Final was staged on Saturday, 19 December, two weeks after the semi-finals.

For the first time since 2000, the football championship was a sudden-death scenario, while the hurling championship – completed on Sunday, 13 December – contained a backdoor format.

== Roll of Honour ==
=== Performance by county ===
County	Title(s)	Runners-up	Winning years	Losing years
Kerry	39	25	1903, 1904, 1909, 1913, 1914, 1924, 1926, 1929, 1930, 1931, 1932, 1937, 1939, 1940, 1941, 1946, 1953, 1955, 1959, 1962, 1969, 1970, 1975, 1978, 1979, 1980, 1981, 1984, 1985, 1986, 1997, 2000, 2004, 2006, 2007, 2009, 2014, 2022, 2025	1892, 1905, 1910, 1915, 1923, 1927, 1938, 1944, 1947, 1954, 1960, 1964, 1965, 1968, 1972, 1976, 1982, 2002, 2005, 2008, 2011, 2015, 2019, 2023, 2026
Dublin	31	13	1891, 1892, 1894, 1897, 1898, 1899, 1901, 1902, 1906, 1907, 1908, 1921, 1922, 1923, 1942, 1958, 1963, 1974, 1976, 1977, 1983, 1995, 2011, 2013, 2015, 2016, 2017, 2018, 2019, 2020, 2023	1896, 1904, 1920, 1924, 1934, 1955, 1975, 1978, 1979, 1984, 1985, 1992, 1994
Galway	9	15	1925, 1934, 1938, 1956, 1964, 1965, 1966, 1998, 2001	1919, 1922, 1933, 1940, 1941, 1942, 1959, 1963, 1971, 1973, 1974, 1983, 2000, 2022, 2024
Cork	7	16	1890, 1911, 1945, 1973, 1989, 1990, 2010	1891, 1893, 1894, 1897, 1899, 1906, 1907, 1956, 1957, 1967, 1987, 1988, 1993, 1999, 2007, 2009
Meath	7	9	1949, 1954, 1967, 1987, 1988, 1996, 1999	1895, 1939, 1951, 1952, 1966, 1970, 1990, 1991, 2001
Cavan	5	6	1933, 1935, 1947, 1948, 1952	1925, 1928, 1937, 1943, 1945, 1949
Wexford	5	3	1893, 1915, 1916, 1917, 1918	1890, 1913, 1914
Down	5	1	1960, 1961, 1968, 1991, 1994	2010
Mayo	4	15	1936, 1950, 1951, 2026	1916, 1921, 1932, 1948, 1989, 1996, 1997, 2004, 2006, 2012, 2013, 2016, 2017, 2020, 2021
Kildare	4	5	1905, 1919, 1927, 1928	1926, 1929, 1931, 1935, 1998
Tyrone	4	3	2003, 2005, 2008, 2021	1986, 1995, 2018
Tipperary	4	1	1889, 1895, 1900, 1920	1918
Offaly	3	3	1971, 1972, 1982	1961, 1969, 1981
Louth	3	3	1910, 1912, 1957	1887, 1909, 1950
Roscommon	2	3	1943, 1944	1946, 1962, 1980
Armagh	2	3	2002, 2024	1953, 1977, 2003
Donegal	2	2	1992, 2012	2014, 2025
Limerick	2	0	1887, 1896	–
Derry	1	1	1993	1958
London^{[a]}	0	5	–	1900, 1901, 1902, 1903, 1908
Laois	0	2	–	1889, 1936
Antrim	0	2	–	1911, 1912
Waterford	0	1	–	1898
Clare	0	1	–	1917
Monaghan	0	1	–	1930

a. London received a bye to the final in five seasons.

=== Performances by province ===
Province	Winners	Runners-up	Total
Leinster	53	38	91
Munster	52	44	96
Ulster	19	19	38
Connacht	15	33	48
Britain	0	5	5

=== Roll of honour statistics ===
- Although Wexford were the first county to win four consecutive All-Ireland Senior Football Finals (1915–18), historically Kerry has been the most successful football team in the All-Ireland Senior Football Championship. As of 2025, Kerry has won the competition on 39 occasions, winning in four consecutive years twice (1929–1932 and 1978–1981) and also for three consecutive years twice (1939–1941 and 1984–1986). Dublin follows Kerry on the competition roll of honour with 31 wins, although up to the 1950s much of the success of Dublin teams was based on teams who had many non-Dublin born players playing.
- Dublin joined the "four in a row" club in 2018 by winning the competition consecutively since 2015. As of 2019, Dublin became the first team to win the competition five times in a row. And in 2020, Dublin won a sixth consecutive title. Galway were the first team from the western province of Connacht to win an All-Ireland title, doing so in 1925. The 1933 final brought victory for Cavan, who became the first team from the northern province of Ulster to win an All-Ireland title.
- Two teams have won the All-Ireland Senior Football Championship as part of a double with that year's All-Ireland Senior Hurling Championship, namely Cork (1890 and 1990) and Tipperary (1895 and 1900). The championship has never been won by a team from outside Ireland, though London have played in five finals.
- Mayo are the reigning champions, winning their fourth title, having defeated Kerry in the 2026 All-Ireland Senior Football Championship final.

== Team records and statistics ==
=== Team results (since the introduction of Tailteann Cup) ===
==== Legend ====
- 1st – Champions
- 2nd – Runners-up
- SF – Semi-finals
- QF/PQF – Quarter-finals/Preliminary quarter-finals
- R3/R2B/R2/R1/GS – Round 3/Round 2B/Round 2/Round 1/Group stage
- TC – Tailteann Cup

For each year, the number of teams (in brackets) are shown.

Team	2022 (16)	2023 (16)	2024 (16)	2025 (16)	2026 (16)	Years
Armagh	QF	QF	1st	QF	R3	4
Cavan	TC	TC	GS	PQF		2
Clare	QF	GS	GS	GS		4
Cork	QF	QF	PQF	PQF	QF	4
Derry	SF	SF	QF	GS		4
Donegal	R2	PQF	SF	2nd	R3	4
Down	TC	TC	TC	PQF		1
Dublin	SF	1st	QF	QF	SF	4
Galway	2nd	PQF	2nd	QF	QF	4
Kerry	1st	2nd	SF	1st	2nd	4
Kildare	R2	PQF	TC	TC	R2B	2
Limerick	R2	TC	TC	TC		1
Louth	R1	GS	QF	PQF	SF	4
Mayo	QF	QF	PQF	GS	1st	4
Meath	R1	TC	GS	SF	R3	3
Monaghan	R1	SF	PQF	QF	QF	4
Roscommon	R2	PQF	QF	GS	R2B	4
Sligo	TC	GS	TC	TC		1
Tyrone	R1	QF	PQF	SF	QF	4
Westmeath	TC	GS	GS	TC	R3	2

=== Debut of counties ===
Year	Debutants	Total
1887	Clare, Cork, Dublin, Galway, Kilkenny, Limerick, Louth, Meath, Tipperary, Waterford, Wexford, Wicklow	12
1888	Cavan, Kildare, Laois, Monaghan	4
1889	Kerry	1
1890	Antrim, Armagh, Tyrone, Westmeath	4
1891	None	0
1892	Roscommon	1
1893–1895	None	0
1896	Offaly	1
1897	Carlow	1
1898–1899	None	0
1900	London	1
1901	Mayo	1
1902	None	0
1903	Fermanagh, Longford	2
1904	Derry, Down	2
1905	Sligo	1
1906	Donegal, Leitrim	2
1907–1998	None	0
1999	New York	1
2000–present	None	0
Total		34

== Player records ==
=== Player of the year ===
Year	Player	County
2025	David Clifford	Kerry
2024	Paul Conroy	Galway
2023	David Clifford	Kerry
2022	David Clifford	Kerry
2021	Kieran McGeary	Tyrone
2020	Brian Fenton	Dublin
2019	Stephen Cluxton	Dublin
2018	Brian Fenton	Dublin
2017	Andy Moran	Mayo
2016	Lee Keegan	Mayo
2015	Jack McCaffrey	Dublin
2014	James O'Donoghue	Kerry

=== All-time appearances ===
Rank	Player	Team	Appearances	Year
1	Stephen Cluxton	Dublin	128	2001–present
2	Seán Cavanagh	Tyrone	89	2002–2017
3	Marc Ó Sé	Kerry	88	2002–2015
4	Tomás Ó Sé	Kerry	88	1998–2013
5	Colm Cooper	Kerry	85	2002–2016
6	Andy Moran	Mayo	84	2004–2019
7	Darragh Ó Sé	Kerry	81	1997–2010
8	Ross Munnelly	Laois	79	2003–2022
9	Aidan O'Shea	Mayo	78	2009–present
10	Tom O'Sullivan	Kerry	76	2000–2011

== Championship Tiers ==
=== Title Holders ===
Competition	Year	Champions	Title	Runners-up	Next edition
All-Ireland Senior Football Championship	2026	Mayo	4th	Kerry	2027
Connacht Senior Football Championship	2026	Roscommon	25th	Galway	2027
Leinster Senior Football Championship	2026	Westmeath	2nd	Dublin	2027
Munster Senior Football Championship	2026	Kerry	87th	Cork	2027
Ulster Senior Football Championship	2026	Armagh	15th	Monaghan	2027
Tailteann Cup	2026	Wicklow	1st	Down	2027
All-Ireland Junior Football Championship	2026	London	7th	United States	2027

=== 2026 Tiers ===
Championship	County team	Province
All-Ireland SFC	Armagh	Ulster
All-Ireland SFC	Cavan	Ulster
All-Ireland SFC	Cork	Munster
All-Ireland SFC	Derry	Ulster
All-Ireland SFC	Donegal	Ulster
All-Ireland SFC	Dublin	Leinster
All-Ireland SFC	Galway	Connacht
All-Ireland SFC	Kerry	Munster
All-Ireland SFC	Kildare	Leinster
All-Ireland SFC	Louth	Leinster
All-Ireland SFC	Mayo	Connacht
All-Ireland SFC	Meath	Leinster
All-Ireland SFC	Monaghan	Ulster
All-Ireland SFC	Roscommon	Connacht
All-Ireland SFC	Tyrone	Ulster
All-Ireland SFC	Westmeath	Leinster
Tailteann Cup	Antrim	Ulster
Tailteann Cup	Carlow	Leinster
Tailteann Cup	Clare	Munster
Tailteann Cup	Down	Ulster
Tailteann Cup	Fermanagh	Ulster
Tailteann Cup	Laois	Leinster
Tailteann Cup	Leitrim	Connacht
Tailteann Cup	Limerick	Munster
Tailteann Cup	London	Britain
Tailteann Cup	Longford	Leinster
Tailteann Cup	New York	North America
Tailteann Cup	Offaly	Leinster
Tailteann Cup	Sligo	Connacht
Tailteann Cup	Tipperary	Munster
Tailteann Cup	Waterford	Munster
Tailteann Cup	Wexford	Leinster
Tailteann Cup	Wicklow	Leinster
All-Ireland JFC	Gloucestershire	Britain
All-Ireland JFC	Hertfordshire	Britain
All-Ireland JFC	Kilkenny	Leinster
All-Ireland JFC	Lancashire	Britain
All-Ireland JFC	London (2nd team)	Britain
All-Ireland JFC	New York (2nd Team)	North America
All-Ireland JFC	Scotland	Britain
All-Ireland JFC	USGAA	North America
All-Ireland JFC	Warwickshire	Britain
All-Ireland JFC	Yorkshire	Britain

== See also ==
- All-Ireland Senior Hurling Championship
- List of All-Ireland Senior Football Championship medal winners
- All-Ireland Senior Club Football Championship
- List of Gaelic games competitions
  - Leinster Senior Football Championship
  - Ulster Senior Football Championship
  - Connacht Senior Football Championship
  - Munster Senior Football Championship
  - Tailteann Cup (Tier 2)
  - All-Ireland Junior Football Championship (Tier 3)
