= 1986 All-Ireland Senior Football Championship =

Football championship

Championship details
- Dates: 18 May – 21 September 1986
- Teams: 32

All-Ireland Champions
- Winning team: Kerry (30th win)
- Captain: Tommy Doyle
- Manager: Mick O'Dwyer

All-Ireland Finalists
- Losing team: Tyrone
- Captain: Eugene McKenna
- Manager: Art McRory

Provincial Champions
- Munster: Kerry
- Leinster: Meath
- Ulster: Tyrone
- Connacht: Galway

Championship statistics
- No. matches played: 31
- Top Scorer: Brendan Mason (3–18)
- Player of the Year: Pat Spillane

The 1986 All-Ireland Senior Football Championship was the 100th staging of the All-Ireland Senior Football Championship, the Gaelic Athletic Association's premier inter-county Gaelic football tournament. The championship began on 18 May and ended on 21 September 1986.

Kerry entered the championship as the defending champions.

On 21 September, Kerry won the championship following a 2–15 to 1–10 defeat of first-time finalists Tyrone in the All-Ireland final. This was their 30th All-Ireland title and their third championship in succession.

Down's Brendan Mason was the championship's top scorer with 3–18. Kerry's Pat Spillane was the choice for Texaco Footballer of the Year.

== Results ==
=== Connacht Senior Football Championship ===
Quarter-finals

1 June 1986 Quarter-final	Sligo	3–5 – 2–13	Galway	Markievicz Park, Sligo
	D McDonagh 0–5, R Henneberry 2–0, J Kent 1–0.		R Fahy 1–6, B O'Donnell 1–0, M Brennan 0–3, V Daly 0–2, B Talty 0–1, G McManus 0–1.	Referee: PJ McGrath (Mayo)

1 June 1986 Quarter-final	London	0–4 – 3–14	Mayo	Emerald GAA Grounds, Ruislip
	M Finnaran 0–2, L Lacey 0–1, F McHale 0–1.		J O'Boyle 1–3, M Butler 1–2, T Reilly 1–1, TJ Kilgallon 0–3, N Durkan 0–2, L McHale 0–1, WJ Padden 0–1, J Burke 0–1.	Referee: S Prior (Leitrim)

Semi-finals

15 June 1986 Semi-final	Mayo	0–12 – 1–11	Roscommon	McHale Park, Castlebar
	P Brogan 0–8, WJ Padden 0–1, J Maughan 0–1, K McStay 0–1, N Durcan 0–1.		T McManus 1–3, P Earley 0–3, A Garvey 0–3, E McManus Snr. 0–2.	Referee: M Kearins (Sligo)

22 June 1986 Semi-final	Galway	2–15 – 2–8	Leitrim	Pearse Stadium, Galway
	B O'Donnell 1–3, B Brennan 1–2, P Kelly 0–5, G McManus 0–4, M Brennan 0–1.		M Martin 2–3, B Breen 0–3, S Mulhern 0–1, C Lynch 0–1.	Referee: S Mullaney (Roscommon)

Final

13 July 1986 Final	Roscommon	1–5 – 1–8	Galway	Dr. Hyde Park, Roscommon
	P Earley 1–0, T Óg O'Brien 0–2, J Kelly 0–1, P MacNeill 0–1, A Garvey 0–1.		S Joyce 1–0, P Kelly 0–2, T Tierney 0–1, B Talty 0–1, R Fahy 0–1, G McManus 0–1, B O'Donnell 0–1, M Brennan 0–1.	Attendance: 13,000; Referee: P Gorman (Sligo)

Quarter-finals
Galway	2–13
Sligo	3–05
Mayo	3–14
London	0–04

Semi-finals
Galway	2–15
Leitrim	2–05
Roscommon	1–11
Mayo	0–12

Final
Galway	1–08
Roscommon	1–05

=== Leinster Senior Football Championship ===
Preliminary round

18 May 1986 Preliminary round	Wexford	1–11 – 1–8	Kildare	Wexford Park, Wexford
	M Hanrick 1–7, P Barden 0–2, S Fitzhenry 0–1, J McGovern 0–1.		J Crofton 1–1, P Farrell 0–2, B Donovan 0–2, A McLoughlin 0–1, S Dowling 0–1, S Ryan 0–1.	Referee: T Jordan (Dublin)

18 May 1986 Preliminary round	Louth	2–11 – 1–5	Longford	Drogheda Park, Drogheda
	S Reid 1–2, Johnny McDonnell 1–0, Jimmy McDonnell 0–3, D McDonnell 0–3, P Matthews 0–1, S Melia 0–1, R Culhane 0–1.		K O'Rourke 1–2, D Rowley 0–2, M O'Hara 0–1.	Attendance: 5,000; Referee: P Kavanagh (Meath)

25 May 1986 Preliminary round	Wicklow	0–15 – 1–5	Westmeath	Aughrim Park, Aughrim
	R McHugh 0–8, P Baker 0–2, A O'Sullivan 0–2, K O'Brien 0–1, C Murphy 0–1, S Morris 0–1.		P McWade 1–1, M Fagan 0–2, P Walsh 0–1, S Hynes 0–1.	Referee: C Buckley (Offaly)

Quarter-finals

8 June 1986 Quarter-final	Dublin	0–17 – 3–3	Wexford	Croke Park, Dublin
	B Rock 0–6, T Carr 0–2, S Kearns 0–2, J McNally 0–2, K Duff 0–1, C Redmond 0–1, N McCaffrey 0–1, D Synnott 0–1, D Sheehan 0–1.		M Hanrick 1–2, G Byrne 1–0, S Fitzhenry 1–0, J McGovern 0–1.	Attendance: 12,085; Referee: S Aldridge (Kildare)

8 June 1986 Quarter-final	Louth	2–8 – 1–13	Offaly	Drogheda Park, Drogheda
	A Wiseman 1–2, S White 1–1, J McDonnell 0–2, D Callaqghan 0–1, D McDonnell 0–1, K Dawe 0–1.		B Lowry 0–5, P Mollen 1–0, K Dunne 0–2, P Brady 0–2, J Mooney 0–2, R Connor 0–1, P Spollen 0–1.	Attendance: 5,000; Referee: P Kavanagh (Meath)

15 June 1986 Quarter-final	Carlow	1–12 – 1–15	Meath	Dr Cullen Park, Carlow
	P Kenny 0–5, P Browne 1–1, W Doyle 0–2, J Hayden 0–1, L Molloy 0–1, L Kearns 0–1, P Quirke 0–1.		D Beggy 1–2, F Murtagh 0–5, C O'Rourke 0–2, B Stafford 0–2, B Flynn 0–1, L Hayes 0–2, J Cassells 0–1.	Attendance: 4,500; Referee: T Jordan (Dublin)

15 June 1986 Quarter-final	Wicklow	2–10 – 1–9	Laois	Aughrim Park, Aughrim
	K O'Brien 2–3, R McHugh 0–3, C Murphy 0–2, P Baker 0–1, P O'Toole 0–1.		E Whelan 1–3, L Irwin 0–3, T Prendergast 0–1, W Brennan 0–1, G Browne 0–1.	Attendance: 12,000; Referee: C Buckley (Offaly)

Semi-finals

29 June 1986 Semi-final	Dublin	1–10 – 0–7	Offaly	O'Moore Park, Portlaoise
	C Redmond 1–3, B Rock 0–3, T Carr 0–2, L Close 0–1, T Conroy 0–1.		B Lowry 0–4, J Guinan 0–1, P Brady 0–1, J Mooney 0–1.	Attendance: 13,793; Referee: P Collins (Westmeath)

6 July 1986 Semi-final	Meath	1–17 – 0–11	Wicklow	St. Conleth's Park, Newbridge
	L Hayes 0–5, B Stafford 0–4, PJ Gillick 1–0, B Flynn 0–3, F Murtagh 0–2, D Beggy 0–2, C O'Rourke 0–1.		R McHugh 0–5, P Baker 0–3, C Murphy 0–1, K O'Brien 0–1, S Morris 0–1.	Referee: S Aldridge (Kildare)

Final

27 July 1986 Final	Meath	0–9 – 0–7	Dublin	Croke Park, Dublin
	Finian Murtagh (0-1f) and Colm O'Rourke 0–3 each, Liam Hayes (0-1f), David Beggy, Bernard Flynn (0-1f) 0–1 each		Barney Rock 0–3 (0-2f, 1 '45), Kieran Duff (0-1f) and Charlie Redmond (0-1f) 0–2 each	Attendance: 43,763; Referee: Seamus Aldridge (Kildare)

Preliminary Round
Wicklow	0–15
Westmeath	1–05
Wexford	1–11
Kildare	1–08
Louth	2–11
Longford	1–05

Quarter-finals
Meath	1–15
Carlow	1–12
Wicklow	2–10
Laois	1–09
Wexford	3–03
Dublin	0–17
Offaly	1–13
Louth	2–08

Semi-finals
Meath	1–17
Wicklow	0–11
Offaly	0–07
Dublin	1–10

Final
Meath	0–09
Dublin	0–07

=== Munster Senior Football Championship ===
Quarter-finals

18 May 1986 Quarter-final	Clare	1–10 – 0–9	Waterford	Cusack Park, Ennis
	A McDermott 1–0, K Kelleher 0–2, G Killeen 0–2, P Burke 0–2, T Tubridy 0–1, F Griffin 0–1, G Fitzpatrick 0–1, P Vaughan 0–1.		E O'Brien 0–3, L Power 0–2, M Reid 0–1, M Walsh 0–1, S Power 0–1, J Maher 0–1.	Referee: T Sugrue (Kerry)

18 May 1986 Quarter-final	Tipperary	2–14 – 1–4	Limerick	Ned Hall Park, Clonmel
	F Kelly 1–6, P McGrath 1–0, J O'Mara 0–3, G McGrath 0–2, L Stokes 0–1, P Dooley 0–1, M Leahy 0–1.		T O'Connor 1–0, L Keane 0–2, L Long 0–1, F Ryan 0–1.	Referee: T Meagher (Waterford)

Semi-finals

15 June 1986 Semi-final	Cork	1–12 – 0–9	Clare	Páirc Mac Gearailt, Fermoy
	B Coffey 1–1, D Barry 0–4, R Swaine 0–3, C O'Neill 0–3, J O'Driscoll 0–1.		P Burke 0–3, P Vaughan 0–2, M Downes 0–1, N Normoyle 0–1, J McGrath 0–1, G Killeen 0–1.	Referee: T Sugrue (Kerry)

15 June 1986 Semi-final	Tipperary	0–12 – 5–9	Kerry	Ned Hall Park, Clonmel
	F Kelly 0–5, L Stokes 0–2, D Foley 0–2, J O'Meara 0–1, J Owens 0–1, G McGrath 0–1.		E Liston 2–2, P Spillane 1–2, J O'Shea 1–1, G Power 1–0, J Kennedy 0–2, M Sheehy 0–1, G Lynch 0–1.	Referee: P Lane (Limerick)

Final

6 July 1986 Final	Kerry	0–12 – 0–8	Cork	Fitzgerald Stadium, Killarney
	J Kennedy 0–4, M Sheehy 0–4, J O'Shea 0–2, T O'Dowd 0–1, T Doyle 0–1.		D Barry 0–4, C O'Neill 0–3, J O'Driscoll 0–1.	Attendance: 33,198; Referee: R Moloney (Limerick)

Quarter-finals
Clare	1–10
Waterford	0–09
Tipperary	2–14
Limerick	1–04

Semi-finals
Cork	1–12
Clare	0–09
Kerry	5–09
Tipperary	0–12

Final
Kerry	0–12
Cork	0–08

=== Ulster Senior Football Championship ===
Preliminary round

18 May 1986 Preliminary round	Down	2–8 – 1–10	Donegal	St. Patrick's Park, Newcastle
	J Treanor 1–2, F McKibben 1–0, B Mason 0–3, A Rodgers 0–1, G Blaney 0–1, L Austin 0–1.		L McGettigan 1–1, M McHugh 0–3, J McMullan 0–3, M Carlin 0–2, A Molloy 0–1.	Attendance: 7,000; Referee: J Gough (Antrim)

Quarter-finals

25 May 1986 Quarter-final	Antrim	0–7 – 1–8	Cavan	Casement Park, Belfast
	L Harbinson 0–2, A McQuillan 0–1, D Graham 0–1, R McGuckin 0–1, E Prenter 0–1, G Mulvenna 0–1,		R Carolan 0–4, D McDonnell 1–0, G Smyth 0–2, P McNamee 0–1, N O'Donnell 0–1.	Referee: S Murray (Monaghan)

1 June 1986 Quarter-final	Tyrone	2–6 – 1–7	Derry	Healy Park, Omagh
	S Rice 1–1, N McGinn 1–0, S Conway 0–4, S McNally 0–1.		D Cassidy 1–0, D Barton 0–2, E Gormley 0–2, E Young 0–1, J McGuirk 0–1, C McKee 0–1.

8 June 1986 Quarter-final	Fermanagh	0–7 – 1–11	Armagh	St. Molaise Park, Irvinestown
	E Greene 0–3, J Rahill 0–1, P McGinnity 0–1, D Corrigan 0–1, G McElroy 0–1.		D Seeley 0–6, N McCabe 1–0, M Toye 0–1, G Houlihan 0–1, S SKelton 0–1, J Kernan 0–1, J McCorry 0–1.	Attendance: 3,000; Referee: M Greenan (Cavan)

15 June 1986 Quarter-final	Monaghan	0–13 – 1–10	Down	St. Mary's Park, Castleblayney
	E Hughes 0–4, E McEneaney 0–4, R McCarron 0–4, K Carragher 0–1.		B Mason 1–3, A Rodgers 0–2, John McCartan 0–2, L Austin 0–1, G Blaney 0–1, T McArdle 0–1.	Attendance: 12,000; Referee: D Campbell (Fermanagh)

22 June 1986 Quarter-final replay	Monaghan	0–11 – 2–11	Down	Newcastle, County Down
	R McCarron 0–6, E Hughes 0–2, E Murphy 0–1, E McEneaney 0–1, B Murray 0–1.		B Mason 0–4, T McCardle 1–0, B Conlon 1–0, John McCartan 0–3, J Treanor 0–2, M Linden 0–1, L Austin 0–1.	Referee: M Greenan (Cavan)

Semi-finals

22 June 1986 Semi-final	Tyrone	2–16 – 1–12	Cavan	St. Molaise Park, Irvinestown
	S Rice 2–0, D O'Hagan 0–6, N McClure 0–3, N Mallon 0–5, K McCabe 0–1, E McKenna 0–1.		R Carolan 0–4, D McDonnell 1–0, M Faulkner 0–3, J Dillon 0–2, N O'Donnell 0–1, J Reilly 0–1, S King 0–1.	Attendance: 8,000; Referee: J Gough (Antrim)

29 June 1986 Semi-final	Down	3–7 – 0–12	Armagh	St. Mary's Park, Castleblayney
	B Mason 2–4, G Blaney 1–1, R Carr 0–2.		S SKelton 0–4, C Harney 0–3, M Toye 0–3, N Smyth 0–1, G Houlihan 0–1.	Attendance: 8,000; Referee: S Murray (Monaghan)

Final

20 July 1986 Final	Tyrone	1–11 – 0–10	Down	St. Tiernach's Park, Clones
	M McClure 0–4, P Donaghy 1–0, M Mahon 0–3, D O'Hagan 0–2, E McKenna 0–1, S McNally 0–1.		B Mason 0–4, G Blaney 0–3, J Treanor 0–2, T McArdle 0–1.	Attendance: 18,000

Preliminary Round
Down	2–08
Donegal	1–10

Quarter-finals
Down	1–10; 2–11
Monaghan	0–13; 0–11
Armagh	1–11
Fermanagh	0–07
Derry	1–07
Tyrone	2–06
Cavan	1–08
Antrim	0–7

Semi-finals
Down	3–07
Armagh	0–12
Cavan	1–12
Tyrone	2–16

Final
Tyrone	1–11
Down	0–10

=== All-Ireland Senior Football Championship ===
Semi-finals

17 August 1986 Semi-final	Tyrone	1–12 – 1–9	Galway	Croke Park, Dublin
	K McCabe 1–0, E McKenna 0–3, D O'Hagan 0–3, P Donaghy 0–1, S McNally 0–1, M Mallon 0–1, S Conway 0–1, P Quinn 0–1, N McGinn 0–1.		B O'Donnell 1–0, G McManus 0–3, S Joyce 0–2, P Kelly 0–1, M Brennan 0–1, V Daly 0–1, T Tierney 0–1.	Attendance: 26,644; Referee: P Collins (Westmeath)

24 August 1986 Semi-Final	Meath	0–12 – 2–13	Kerry	Croke Park, Dublin
	B Flynn 0–5, C O'Rourke 0–2, L Hayes 0–2, F Murtagh 0–1, T Ferguson 0–1, M O'Connell 0–1.		W Maher 1–1, M Sheehy 0–4, G Power 1–0, E Liston 0–3, P Spillane 0–2, T Doyle 0–1, J O'Shea 0–1, D Moran 0–1.	Attendance: 45,405; Referee: M Greenan (Cavan)

Final

21 September 1986 Final	Kerry	2–15 – 1–10	Tyrone	Croke Park, Dublin
	P Spillane 1–4, M Sheehy 1–4, E Liston 0–2, D Moran 0–2, T O'Dowd 0–2, G Power 0–1.		P Quinn 1–1, M Mallon 0–4, S McNally 0–2, M McClure 0–1, K McCabe 0–1, D O'Hagan 0–1.	Attendance: 65,628; Referee: J Dennigan (Cork)

== Championship statistics ==
=== Scoring ===
Overall

Rank	Player	County	Tally	Total	Matches	Average
1	Brendan Mason	Down	3–18	27	5	5.40
2	Mikey Sheehy	Kerry	1–13	16	4	4.00
2	Robert McHugh	Wicklow	0–16	16	3	5.33
4	Martin Hanrick	Wexford	2–9	15	2	7.50
5	Pat Spillane	Kerry	2–8	14	4	3.50
5	Franny Kelly	Tipperary	1–11	14	2	7.00
7	Brian O'Donnell	Galway	3–4	13	4	3.25
7	Eoin Liston	Kerry	2–7	13	4	3.25
9	Damien O'Hagan	Tyrone	0–12	12	5	2.40
10	Kevin O'Brien	Wicklow	2–5	11	3	3.66

Top scorers in a single game

Rank	Player	Team	Tally	Total	Opposition
1	Brendan Mason	Down	2–4	10	Armagh
1	Martin Hanrick	Wexford	1–7	10	Kildare
3	Kevin O'Brien	Wicklow	2–3	9	Laois
3	Michael Martin	Leitrim	2–3	9	Galway
3	Franny Kelly	Tipperary	1–6	9	Limerick
3	R. Fahy	Galway	1–6	9	London
7	Eoin Liston	Kerry	2–2	8	Clare
7	Robert McHugh	Wicklow	0–8	8	Westmeath
7	Pádraig Brogan	Mayo	0–8	8	Roscommon
10	Pat Spillane	Kerry	1–4	7	Tyrone
10	Mikey Sheehy	Kerry	1–4	7	Tyrone

=== Miscellaneous ===
- Meath win their first Leinster football title since 1970.
- After facing defeat in four previous All-Ireland semi-finals (1956, 1957, 1973, 1984), Tyrone's defeat of Galway at the penultimate stage allows the team to qualify for their very first All-Ireland final.
- Kerry's Pat Spillane, Páidí Ó Sé and Denis "Ógie" Moran became the first players in the history of the championship to win eight All-Ireland medals on the field of play. Mikey Sheehy also won an eighth All-Ireland medal, however, he missed the 1984 All-Ireland final through injury.
- The All Ireland final was the first meeting between Kerry and Tyrone.
