= 1888 All-Ireland Senior Football Championship =

Football championship

All-Ireland Champions
- Winning team: Not played ( win)

Provincial Champions
- Munster: Tipperary
- Leinster: Kilkenny
- Ulster: Monaghan
- Connacht: Not played

Championship statistics

The 1888 All-Ireland Senior Football Championship was unfinished owing to the American Invasion Tour, an unsuccessful attempt to raise funds for a revival of the Tailteann Games.

The 1888 provincial championships had been completed (Tipperary, Kilkenny and Monaghan winning them; no Connacht teams entered) but after the Invasion tour returned, the All-Ireland semi-final and final were not played.

== Results ==
=== Leinster ===
3 June 1888
Quarter-final

Dublin	1–6 – 0–1	Kildare

Donnybrook
Referee: JJ Reilly

10 June 1888
Quarter-final

Kilkenny	1–3 – 0–0	Queen's County

Maryborough
Attendance: 10,000
Referee: GF Moore

1 July 1888
Quarter-final

Wicklow	0–2 – 0–1	Wexford

Donnybrook
Attendance: 8,000
Referee: JJ Reilly

Wicklow used illegal players, and the game was stopped by a pitch invasion with ten minutes to go, so a replay was ordered.

19 August 1888
Quarter-final replay

Wexford	1–3 – 0–2	Wicklow

Clonskeagh
Attendance: 5,000
Referee: JP Cox

19 August 1888
Quarter-final

Louth	2–4 – 0–0	Meath

Bryanstown
Referee: JJ O'Reilly

2 September 1888
Semi-final

Kilkenny	2–1 – 0–3	Louth

Clonskeagh
Referee: JJ Cullen

2 September 1888
Semi-final

Wexford	0–4 – 0–3	Dublin

Clonskeagh
Referee: T Harrington

23 September 1888
Final

Kilkenny	1–4 – 0–2	Wexford

New Ross

=== Munster ===
27 May 1888
Quarter-final

Tipperary	0–2 – 0–2	Cork

Buttevant
Attendance: 12,000
Referee: T.O'Riordan

8 July 1888
Semi-final

Clare	1–3 – 1–0	Limerick

Birdhill
Referee: J Callinan

Limerick were awarded the game due to Clare playing illegal players.

22 July 1888
Semi-final

Tipperary	0–3 – 0–1	Waterford

Clonmel
Referee: T Harrington

10 November 1888
Final

Tipperary	w/o – scr.	Limerick

Pallasgreen

=== Ulster ===
19 August 1888
Final

Monaghan	0–2 – 0–2	Cavan

Drogheda

Neither team could field the full 21 players, so 15-a-side was agreed.

9 September 1888
Final Replay

Monaghan	0–3 – 0–0	Cavan

Bryanstown, County Meath

== Statistics ==
Sligo and Mayo played a draw in the Connacht final. There is no record of a replay.

=== Miscellaneous ===
No All-Ireland series due to US tour.
