= 1901 All-Ireland Senior Football Championship =

Football championship

All-Ireland Champions
- Winning team: Dublin (7th win)
- Captain: David "Gush" Brady

All-Ireland Finalists
- Losing team: London

Provincial Champions
- Munster: Cork
- Leinster: Dublin
- Ulster: Antrim
- Connacht: Mayo

Championship statistics

The 1901 All-Ireland Senior Football Championship was the 15th staging of Ireland's premier Gaelic football knock-out competition. The Munster semi-final Cork ended Tipperary's day as All Ireland champions. Dublin were the winners.

== Format ==
The four provincial championships are played as usual. The four champions play in the "Home" championship, with the winners of the Home final going on to face London in the All-Ireland final.

== Results ==
=== Connacht ===
Connacht Senior Football Championship

12 October 1902
Semi-Final

Galway	0–5 – 0–3	Roscommon

Ballaghadereen

9 November 1902
Final

Mayo	2–4 – 0–3	Galway

Claremorris

=== Leinster ===
Leinster Senior Football Championship

1901
Preliminary Round 1

Dublin	3–14 – 1–2	Kilkenny

Terenure

1901
Preliminary Round 1

Wexford	0–7 – 1–4	Wicklow

Wexford Park

1901
Preliminary Round 1

Louth	6–19 – 0–5	Meath

19 October 1902
Preliminary Round 2

Louth	2–14 – 0–0	Offaly

Jones' Road
Referee: JW Kenny

1901
Quarter-Final

Kildare	2–5 – 1–3	Laois

Portarlington

1901
Quarter-Final Replay

Kildare	4–15 – 1–1	Laois

Donnycarney

1901
Quarter-Final

Dublin	1–15 – 1–5	Wicklow

Rathmines

1901
Quarter-Final

Meath	3–6 – 2–5	Carlow

Donnycarney

1901
Quarter-Final

Louth	3–9 – 1–7	Kildare

Jones' Road

1902
Semi-Final

Meath	0–4 – 0–8	Wexford

Jones' Road

1902
Semi-Final

Dublin	1–5 – 0–3	Louth

Drogheda

An objection was made and a replay ordered.

1902
Semi-Final Replay

Dublin	1–5 – 0–3	Louth

Jones' Road

22 March 1903
Final

Dublin	1–9 – 0–1	Wexford
M Whelan 1–0, J Darcy, T Lawless, M O'Brien, Val Harris (0-1f) 0–2 each, Joe Whelan 0–1		P McCormack 0–1

Kilkenny
Referee: John McCarthy (Kilkenny)

=== Munster ===
Munster Senior Football Championship

31 August 1902
Quarter-Final

Cork	0–8 – 0–1	Kerry

Market's Field, Limerick
- Match abandoned due to an illness to the referee

5 October 1902
Quarter-Final Replay

Cork	0–8 – 0–6	Kerry

Millstreet

19 October 1902
Quarter-Final

Tipperary	0–5 – 0–4	Waterford

Turners Cross Stadium, Cork
Referee: J.Fitzgerald

15 March 1903
Quarter-Final Replay

Tipperary	0–9 – 0–2	Waterford

Carrick-on-Suir
Referee: J.Fitzgerald

29 March 1903
Semi-Final

Cork	2–3 – 0–6	Tipperary

Market's Field, Limerick
Referee: J. Fitzgerald

19 April 1903
Final

Cork	1–9 – 1–6	Limerick

Tipperary

=== Ulster ===
Ulster Senior Football Championship

22 March 1903
Final

Antrim	3–5 – 2–5	Armagh

=== Semi-finals ===
12 April 1903
Home Semi-Final

Dublin	2–12 – 0–2	Antrim

Jones' Road, Dublin

17 May 1903
Home Semi-Final

Cork	4–16 – 0–1	Mayo

Limerick

5 July 1903
Home Final

Dublin	1–2 – 0–4	Cork

Tipperary

=== Final ===
2 August 1903
Final

Dublin	0–14 – 0–2	London

Jones's Road, Dublin
Attendance: 2,000
Referee: John McCarthy (Kilkenny)
