= 1893 All-Ireland Senior Football Championship =

Football championship

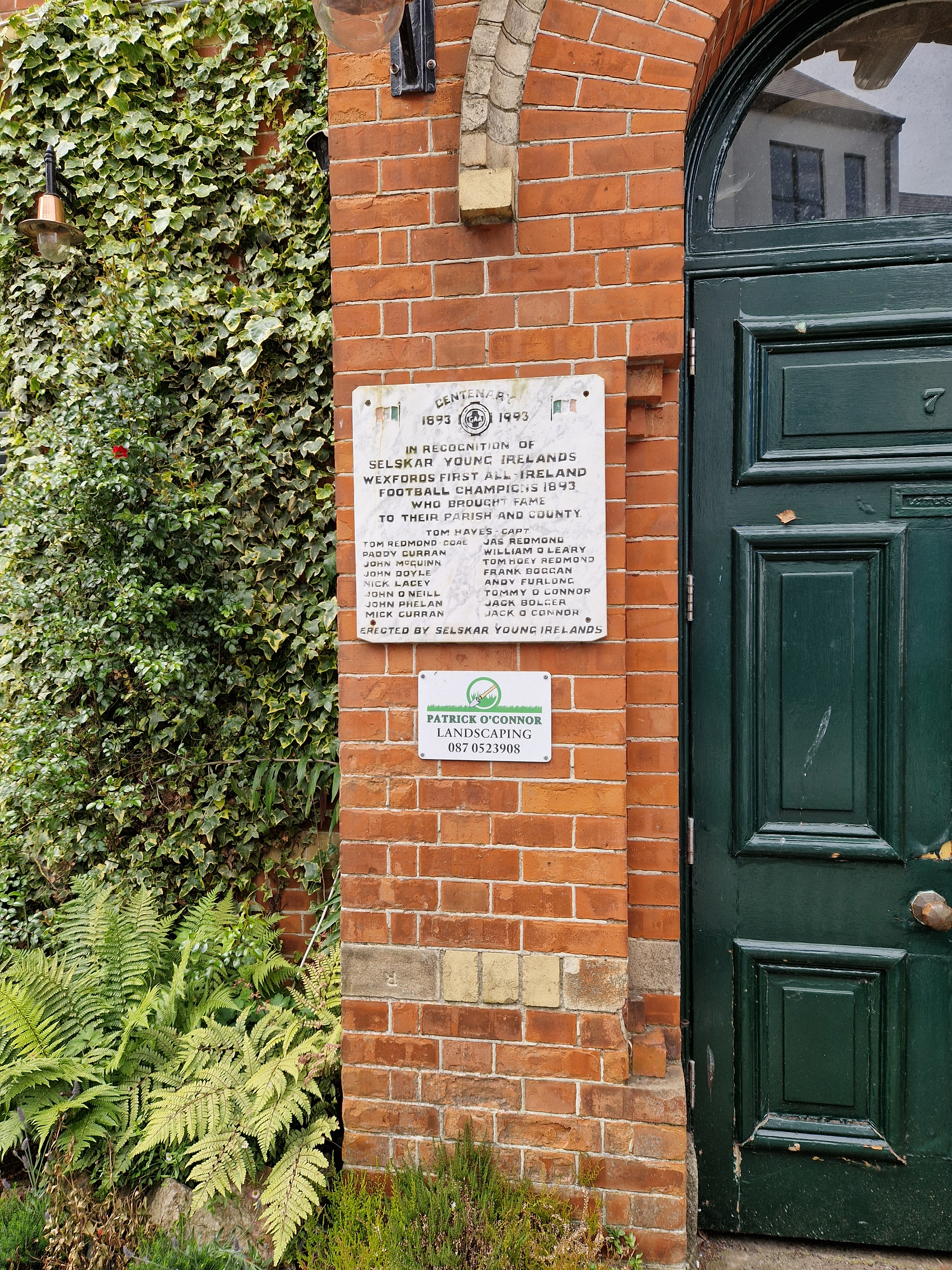

All-Ireland Champions
- Winning team: Wexford (1st win)
- Captain: Tom Hayes

All-Ireland Finalists
- Losing team: Cork

Provincial Champions
- Munster: Cork
- Leinster: Wexford

Championship statistics

The 1893 All-Ireland Senior Football Championship was the seventh staging of Ireland's premier Gaelic football knock-out competition. The previous two years' All-Ireland champions Dublin did not take part in the Leinster Championship called off game against Kilkenny. Wexford were the champions.

== Results ==
=== Leinster ===
3 June 1894
Semi-Final

Dublin	0–0 – 0–0	Kilkenny

Kilkenny

3 June 1894
Semi-Final

Wexford	2–6 – 0–1	Westmeath

Phoenix Park

3 June 1894
Final

Wexford	0–1 – 0–5 Unfinished	Kilkenny

Wexford

Kilkenny refused to take the field for the second half in protest at rough play by the Wexford team. Wexford were awarded the Leinster title.

=== Munster ===
1893
Semi-Final

Cork	0–4 – 0–3	Tipperary

Cork

1 April 1894
Final

Cork	2–3 – 1–4	Kerry

Mallow

=== Final ===
24 June 1894

Wexford	1–1 – 0–1	Cork

Phoenix Park, Dublin
Attendance: 1,000
Referee: T Gilligan (Dublin)

== Statistics ==
- Wexford win a first Leinster SFC and a first All-Ireland SFC title.
- Connacht and Ulster counties withdraw until 1899.
