= 1897 All-Ireland Senior Football Championship =

Football championship

All-Ireland Champions
- Winning team: Dublin (4th win)
- Captain: P. J. Walsh

All-Ireland Finalists
- Losing team: Cork

Provincial Champions
- Munster: Cork
- Leinster: Dublin

Championship statistics

The 1897 All-Ireland Senior Football Championship was the 11th staging of Ireland's premier Gaelic football knock-out competition. The Munster final saw Cork ending Limerick's All Ireland title. The Leinster championship was notable for seeing Wicklow's only Leinster SFC final appearance.

Dublin were the Leinster and All-Ireland winners.

== Results ==
=== Leinster ===
1898
Preliminary Round

Dublin	0–14 – 0–1	Kilkenny

Carlow

1898
Preliminary Round

Westmeath	Lost – Won	Wicklow

26 June 1898
Preliminary Round

Kildare	2–17 – 0–9	Laois

Jones's Road, Dublin

17 July 1898
Quarter-Final

Kildare	0–2 – 2–5	Dublin

Jones's Road, Dublin

24 July 1898
Quarter-Final

Offaly	Lost – Won	Wicklow

Jones's Road, Dublin

1898
Quarter-Final

Meath	0–3 – 1–7	Louth

Balbriggan

1898
Quarter-Final

Wexford	2–24 – 0–5	Carlow

Jones's Road, Dublin

1898
Semi-Final

Wexford	1–7 – 1–5	Dublin

Jones's Road, Dublin

1898
Semi-Final Replay

Wexford	0–9 – 0–10	Dublin

Jones's Road, Dublin

1898
Semi-Final

Wicklow	1–6 – 1–4	Louth

Jones's Road, Dublin

30 October 1898
Final

Dublin	scr. – w/o	Wicklow

Jones's Road, Dublin

Dublin did not take the field, assuming that heavy rain and a waterlogged pitch meant the game would be cancelled. Wicklow were initially declared Leinster champions by default, but this was overturned.

18 December 1898
Final Refixture

Dublin	1–9 – 0–3	Wicklow

Jones's Road, Dublin

=== Munster ===
1898
Quarter-Final

Tipperary	Win – Lost	Kerry

Mallow

1 May 1898
Quarter-Final

Cork	1–5 – 1–4	Waterford

Dungarvan

1 August 1898
Semi-Final

Cork	0–5 – 1–0	Tipperary

Cork Park
Referee: J. Wall (Waterford)

1898
Semi-Final

Clare	1–1 – 0–9	Limerick

Limerick

25 September 1898
Final

Cork	0–5 – 0–3	Limerick

Tipperary

=== Final ===
5 February 1899

Dublin	2–6 – 0–2	Cork

Jones's Road, Dublin
Attendance: 4,000
Referee: Spencer Lyons (Limerick)

== Statistics ==
- Dublin begin their first All-Ireland SFC triple and the first county ever to do it.
- Wicklow's only appearance in a Leinster SFC final.

== Roll of Honour ==
- Dublin – 4 (1897)
- Tipperary – 2 (1895)
- Limerick – 2 (1896)
- Cork – 1 (1890)
- Wexford – 1 (1893)
