= 1889 All-Ireland Senior Football Championship =

Football championship

All-Ireland Champions
- Winning team: Tipperary (1st win)
- Captain: Gil Cavanagh

All-Ireland Finalists
- Losing team: Laois

Provincial Champions
- Munster: Tipperary
- Leinster: Laois
- Ulster: Not played
- Connacht: Not played

Championship statistics

The 1889 All-Ireland Senior Football Championship was the third staging of Ireland's premier Gaelic football knock-out competition. 1887 All Ireland champions Limerick were not part of the Munster championship. Tipperary were the champions.

== Format ==
Only two provincial championship were played: Leinster and Munster. The winners met in the All-Ireland final.

== Representative clubs ==
From 1887 until 1891 the club champions represented the whole county.

| County | Club |
|---|---|
| Cork | Midleton |
| Kerry | Laune Rangers |
| Louth | Newtown Blues |
| Laois (Queen's County) | Maryborough |
| Tipperary | Bohercrowe |

== Results ==
=== Leinster ===
25 August 1889
Quarter-final

| Louth | 2–7 – 0–6 | Dublin |

Drogheda
Attendance: 8,000
Referee: PR Cleary

15 September 1889
Semi-final

| Louth | w/o – scr. | Kilkenny |

Dublin

15 September 1889
Semi-final

| Wicklow | w/o – scr. | Laois |

Dublin

15 September 1889
Final

| Louth | 1–7 – 1–4 | Wicklow |

Dublin

The Wicklow–Laois game was later ordered to be played again, and so the final had to be played again as well.

13 October 1889
Semi-final, Refixed

| Laois | 0–9 – 0–4 | Wicklow |

Inchicore
Attendance: 2,000
Referee: P Brown

13 October 1889
Final, Refixed

| Laois | 0–3 – 0–2 | Louth |

Inchicore
Attendance: 2,000
Referee: JJ Reilly

| 1 |
| 2 |
| 3 |
| 4 |
| 5 |
| 6 |
| 7 |
| 8 |
| 9 |
| 10 |
| 11 |
| 12 |
| 13 |
| 14 |
| 15 |
| 16 |
| 17 |
| 18 |
| 19 |
| 20 |
| 21 |

| 1 | Jack Rooney (gk) |
| 2 | James Mooney (c) |
| 3 | Eugene Clifford |
| 4 | James Kelly |
| 5 | Patrick Byrne |
| 6 | F. Farrell |
| 7 | Bernard Woods |
| 8 | Joe Carroll |
| 9 | James McCann |
| 10 | John Hughes |
| 11 | Peter Allen |
| 12 | Peter Hickey |
| 13 | J. Dillon |
| 14 | Robert Allen |
| 15 | Francis Carroll |
| 16 | Nick Tiernan |
| 17 | Paddy Rooney |
| 18 | Joe Connor |
| 19 | Pat Finegan |
| 20 | Thomas Heaney |
| 21 | Jack Louth |

=== Munster ===
29 March 1889
Quarter-final

| Tipperary | w/o – scr. | Clare |

29 March 1889
Semi-final

| Tipperary | W – L | Waterford |

28 July 1889
Semi-final

| Cork | 0–2 – 0–1 | Kerry |

Mallow
Referee: T. R. Cleary

6 October 1889
Final

| Tipperary | 1–2 – 0–3 | Cork |

Mallow
Referee: E Moynihan

=== Final ===
20 October 1889

| Tipperary | 3–6 – 0–0 | Laois |

Inchicore
Attendance: 1,500
Referee: M. O'Driscoll

== Statistics ==
- Tipperary win the first All-Ireland title.
