= 1900 All-Ireland Senior Football Championship =

Football championship

Championship details
- Dates: 18 August 1901 – 26 October 1902

All-Ireland Champions
- Winning team: Tipperary (3rd win)
- Captain: Jack Tobin

All-Ireland Finalists
- Losing team: London

Provincial Champions
- Munster: Tipperary
- Leinster: Kilkenny
- Ulster: Antrim
- Connacht: Galway

Championship statistics
- No. matches played: 9

The 1900 All-Ireland Senior Football Championship was the 14th staging of Ireland's premier Gaelic football knock-out competition. The Leinster Quarter Final Wexford end Dublin's 3 year All Ireland title. Tipperary were the winners.

== Format ==
1900 saw the introduction of a new All-Ireland format. The four provincial championships would be played as usual. The four champions play in the "Home" championship, with the winners of the Home final going on to face London in the All-Ireland final.

== Results ==
=== Connacht ===
Connacht Senior Football Championship

Galway were the only entrants, so they received a bye to the Home semi-final.

=== Leinster ===
Leinster Senior Football Championship

1901
Round 1

Wexford	0–4 – 0–5	Kildare

1901
Round 2

Dublin	0–0 – 0–0	Kildare

1901
Round 3

Dublin	7–17 – 0–3	Laois

1901
Round 4

Kilkenny	2–11 – 0–0	Carlow

Borris

1901
Round 5

Louth	6–19 – 0–7	Meath

Drogheda

19 October 1901
Quarter-Final

Laois	5–14 – 1–1	Kildare

Jones Road

1900
Quarter-Final

Wexford	1–7 – 0–8	Dublin

Kilkenny

18 August 1901
Quarter-Final

Offaly	0–1 – 6–14	Louth

Donnycarney

19 October 1901
Quarter-Final

Kildare	1–7 – 3–9	Louth

Jones Road

1901
Semi-final

Wicklow	0–7 – 1–8	Louth

Monkstown

1901
Semi-final

Kilkenny	1–5 – 0–5	Wexford

3 November 1901 Final	Kilkenny	0–12 – 0–0	Louth	Wexford Park
				Referee: W.H. Redmond (Dublin)

1	Pat Crowley (gk)
2	Dan Maher
3	Dick Purcell (c)
4	Dan Harney
5	John O'Shea
6	James Cooney
7	William Morrissey
8	Tom Phelan
9	Martin Bowers
10	Pat Wall
11	Mick Tobin
12	Jim Dwyer
13	Jim Burke
14	Jack O'Neill
15	Pat Conway
16	Bill O'Toole
17	John Hyland

1	Paddy Cluskey (gk)
2	Jim Harrison
3	Paddy McDonnell (c)
4	Jack Clarke
5	Dick Murray
6	Bill Sherry
7	Joe Mooney
8	Jim Hughes
9	Jimmy Quinn
10	Jimmy Martin
11	John Gregory
12	Johnny Gerrard
13	Peter L'Estrange
14	Jim Murray
15	Chris McCann
16	Nick O'Neill
17	Eddie Dempsey

- Kilkenny fielded the Slate Quarry Miners side that won the 1900 Kilkenny Senior Football Championship. Louth were represented by Drogheda Independents, the outgoing Louth county champions.

=== Munster ===
Munster Senior Football Championship

20 October 1901
Quarter-Final

Limerick	w/o	Clare

Markets Field

3 November 1901
Quarter-Final

Tipperary	0–3 – 0–1	Cork

Dungarvan
Referee: P. Hayes (L)

10 November 1901
Semi-final

Kerry	1–3 – 0–5	Waterford

Turner's Cross

16 March 1902
Semi-final

Tipperary	2–4 – 2–1	Limerick

Tipperary
Referee: T.Dooley

11 May 1902
Final

Tipperary	1–13 – 1–2	Kerry

Markets Field
Referee: J.Fitzgerald

=== Ulster ===
Ulster Senior Football Championship

Antrim were the only entrants, so they received a bye to the Home semi-final.

=== Semi-finals ===
1900
Home Semi-final

Galway	w/o – scr.	Antrim

29 June 1902
Home Semi-final

Tipperary	0–7 – 1–6	Kilkenny

Carrick-on-Suir
Referee: T. Redmond

Tipperary made an objection and were awarded the game.

21 September 1902
Home Final

Tipperary	2–17 – 0–1	Galway

Terenure

=== Final ===
26 October 1902
Final

Tipperary	3–7 – 0–2	London

Jones's Road, Dublin
Attendance: 2,000
Referee: T. Redmond

== Statistics ==
=== Miscellaneous ===
- Connacht and Munster back for the first time since 1892.
- London become part of the All Ireland Series.
- Tipperary won the double in football and hurling for the like 5 years before hand in 1895 the last time that it happened until Cork in 1990.
