= 1895 All-Ireland Senior Football Championship =

Football championship

All-Ireland Champions
- Winning team: Tipperary (2nd win)
- Captain: Paddy Finn

All-Ireland Finalists
- Losing team: Meath

Provincial Champions
- Munster: Tipperary
- Leinster: Meath
- Ulster: Not played
- Connacht: Not played

Championship statistics

The 1895 All-Ireland Senior Football Championship was the ninth staging of Ireland's premier Gaelic football knock-out competition. Dublin entered the championship as the defending champions, however, they were defeated by Meath in the Leinster final. Tipperary were the champions.

== Results ==
=== Leinster ===
1896
Preliminary Round

Louth	0-6– 0–1	Cavan

1896
Preliminary Round

Kildare	1–4 – 0–4	Wexford

Clonturk Park, Dublin

1896
Quarter-Final

Kildare	2–10 – 0–2	Louth

Clonturk Park, Dublin

16 February 1896
Semi-Final

Kildare	0–4 – 2–7	Dublin

Jones's Road, Dublin

1896
Semi-Final

Kilkenny	1–0 – 1–13	Meath

Jones's Road, Dublin

1 March 1896
Final

Meath	0–6 – 0–2	Dublin

Jones's Road, Dublin

=== Munster ===
1895
Quarter-Final

Limerick	0–0 – 0–0	Waterford

Tipperary

30 November 1895
Semi-Final

Limerick	5–6 – 1–1	Kerry

Mallow
Referee: RT Blake

1 February 1896
Semi-Final

Tipperary	2–7 – 0–1	Waterford

Tipperary

23 February 1896
Final

Tipperary	0–5 – 0–2	Limerick

Kilmallock
Referee: RT. Blake

=== Final ===
15 March 1896

Tipperary	0–4 – 0–3	Meath

Jones's Road, Dublin
Attendance: 8,000
Referee: J. J. Kenny (Dublin)

== Statistics ==
- Cavan were part of the Leinster SFC.
- Meath win a first Leinster SFC title.
- Tipperary, like Cork in 1890, won the Hurling and Football double in the same year, they would do so again five years later in 1900.
