= Anton O'Toole =

Irish Gaelic footballer (1951–2019)

Personal information
- Native name: Antóin Ó Tuathail (Irish)
- Nicknames: The Blue Panther, Tooler
- Born: 18 February 1951 Dublin, Ireland
- Died: 17 May 2019 (aged 68) Dublin, Ireland
- Occupation: IT consultant
- Height: 6 ft 1 in (185 cm)

Sport
- Sport: Gaelic football
- Position: Full-forward
Club
- Years: Club
- Synge Street P.P.
Club titles
- Dublin titles: 0
Inter-county**
Years	County	Apps (scores)
1972–1984	Dublin	47 (7–50)
Inter-county titles
- Leinster titles: 8
- All-Irelands: 4
- NFL: 2
- All Stars: 3
- **Inter County team apps and scores correct as of (20:30, 18 August 2006 (UTC)).

Anthony Thomas O'Toole (18 February 1951 – 17 May 2019) was an Irish Gaelic footballer. His league and championship career at senior level with the Dublin county team spanned thirteen seasons from 1972 to 1984, including six All-Ireland finals in a row. O'Toole won four All-Ireland championship titles.

== Background ==
Born in Dublin, O'Toole first played competitive Gaelic football during his schooling at Synge Street CBS. He joined Synge Street PPGFC and won a county junior championship medal in 1970.

== Inter-county career ==
O'Toole made his debut on the inter-county scene when he was picked on the Dublin minor team. He subsequently joined the Dublin under-21 team, under Eugene McGee. O'Toole joined the Dublin senior team during the 1972 championship. Over the course of the next thirteen seasons he won four All-Ireland medals, beginning with a lone triumph in 1974, back-to-back championships in 1976 and 1977 and a final title in 1983. O'Toole also won eight Leinster medals, played in 6 consecutive finals (1974–1979), won two National Football League medals and three All-Stars.

O'Toole could play anywhere in the front eight. He played much of his career at left wing forward, although he started his first All-Ireland Final in 1974 at corner-forward, and his final one in 1983 at full forward.

With Brian Mullins, he was the last of the '74 team left in the side when they won their final championship of that era in 1983, although at that stage O'Toole had been remade into a full forward. He played his last game for Dublin in September 1984.

== Managerial career ==
In retirement from playing O'Toole became involved in team management and coaching. He guided Templeogue Synge Street to the Dublin Intermediate Football Championship title in 2008.

== Death ==
He died in May 2019 after a 15-month battle with cancer. Tributes were paid from all across the GAA world. At his funeral the pallbearers included many of O'Toole's former teammates including Kevin Moran, Fran Ryder and Bobby Doyle, as well as current Dublin players Niall Scully, Ciarán Kilkenny and Brian Howard.

== Honours ==
=== Team ===
Synge Street PP

- Dublin Intermediate Football Championship (1): 1970

Dublin

- All-Ireland Senior Football Championship (4): 1974, 1976, 1977, 1983
- Leinster Senior Football Championship (8): 1974, 1975, 1976, 1977, 1978, 1979, 1983, 1984
- National Football League (2): 1975-76, 1977-78

=== Individual ===
Awards

- All-Stars Awards (3): 1975, 1976, 1977
