= Seán Doherty (Gaelic footballer) =

Irish Gaelic footballer and manager (1946–2025)

Personal information
- Native name: Seán Ó Dochartaigh (Irish)
- Nickname: The Doc
- Born: 14 July 1946 Wicklow, Ireland
- Died: 7 July 2025 (aged 78) Dublin, Ireland
- Occupation: Plumbing contractor
- Height: 6 ft 3 in (191 cm)

Sport
- Sport: Gaelic football
- Position: Full-back
Clubs
- Years: Club
- Ballyboden Wanderers; Ballyboden St Enda's
Inter-county
- Years: County
- 1968–1978: Dublin
Inter-county titles
- Leinster titles: 5
- All-Irelands: 3
- NFL: 2
- All Stars: 1

Seán Doherty (14 July 1946 – 7 July 2025) was an Irish Gaelic football manager and player who played football with his local club Ballyboden Wanderers, Ballyboden St Enda's and St Anne's and was a senior member of the Dublin county team throughout the 1970s. Doherty captained Dublin to the All-Ireland SFC title in 1974. He later served as joint-manager of the team with Gerry McCaul and Tony Hempenstall for one season in 1989.

== Early life ==
Seán Doherty was born in Wicklow, Ireland on 14 July 1946. He went to school in Wicklow Town and grew up living in Kilnamanagh, Deputy's Pass, a short distance to the West of Wicklow Town. As a teenager he moved to Dublin with his family, but continued to play football for Wicklow up until U21.

== Playing career ==
=== Club ===
Seán Doherty played his club football with a selection of clubs throughout the 1960s and 1970s; however, it was with Ballyboden Wanderers/Ballyboden St Enda's that he had his greatest successes.

He first came to prominence with Ballyboden Wanderers when he captained the 1968 Dublin Junior Football championship winning team. The following season Ballyboden Wanderers joined forces with Rathfarnham St Enda's to become Ballyboden St Enda's. He went on to play in the county intermediate championship in the 1970s. In 1971, he won his 1st Intermediate championship, before adding a 2nd to his collection three years later in 1974.

In later years, Doherty served as player-manager with Tallaght-based club St Anne's.

=== Inter-county ===
Seán Doherty first came to prominence on the inter-county scene as a senior member of the Dublin county team in 1969, amassing 105 caps playing for Dublin. He played for Dublin in some barren years. However, he was a formidable part at beginning of a resurgence for 'the Dubs' who had been in the doldrums for much of the previous decade.

In 1974, Doherty was appointed captain, by Kevin Heffernan, when he played in his first Leinster final in the senior grade. Archrivals Meath set out to stop 'the Dubs' claiming a first provincial title since 1965. A new look Dublin under the stewardship of Kevin Heffernan made no mistake in securing a 1-14 to 1-9 victory. It was Doherty's first Leinster winners' medal in the senior grade. Dublin later surprisingly defeated All-Ireland title-holders Cork in the semi-final, thus booking a place in the All-Ireland final against Galway. The men from the west, who had been beaten in two of the previous three championship deciders, took a 1-4 to 0-5 lead at half-time, however, the real turning point of the game came in the 52nd minute. Galway were awarded a penalty which Liam Sammon stepped up to take. Goalkeeper Paddy Cullen made no mistake and saved the shot. 'The Dub's' later went on to take the lead as Galway collapsed. A 0-14 to 1-6 score line resulted in a first All-Ireland winners' medal for Doherty and a first for Dublin in eleven years. He capped off the year by collecting his only All-Star award.

Dublin proved that their success in 1974 was not a flash-in-the-pan by retaining the Leinster title in 1975 after an enormous 3-13 to 0-8 defeat of Kildare. Doherty's side were the red-hot favourites going into the All-Ireland final against the youngest Kerry teams of all-time. On a rain-soaked day, John Egan and substitute Ger O'Driscoll scored two goals for Kerry and 'the Dubs' were ambushed by 2-12 to 0-11. It was a bitter defeat for a Dublin team that had expected so much.

Dublin continued their dominance in 1976. After securing the National League title 'the Dubs' dominated the provincial championship once again. A narrow 2-8 to 1-9 defeat of Meath gave Doherty a third consecutive Leinster winners' medal. Once again, it was Kerry who provided the opposition, as one of the great rivalries of football entered a new chapter. Both sides were hoping for success, however, new 'Dub' Kevin Moran was causing havoc with the Kerry defence. Immediately after the game started he careered through the Kerry half-back and full-back lines, however, his shot at goal went wide. This set the pace for the rest of the match. John McCarthy finished a five-man move to score Dublin's first goal of the day. A converted penalty by Jimmy Keaveney was followed by a third goal from Brian Mullins. A 3-8 to 0-10 score line gave Dublin the title and gave Doherty a second All-Ireland winners' medal.

The 1977 Leinster final was a replay of the previous year with the result being the same. Meath provided some stiff opposition but fell short, eventually losing the game by 1-9 to 0-8. It was Doherty's fourth consecutive Leinster title. Dublin later took on Kerry for the third consecutive year, however, this time it was in the All-Ireland semi-final. In one of the greatest games of football ever-played 'the Dubs' triumphed and booked a final spot against Armagh. An eight-goal thriller ensued, with Jimmy Keaveney scored the first of the day after just ninety seconds. He ended the day with a record 2-6 from play. Bobby Doyle soon followed with the first of his two goals while John McCarthy got a fifth. Armagh were awarded two penalties, however, the northerners spurned some golden goal-scoring opportunities. A huge 5-12 to 3-6 victory gave Dublin a second consecutive title and gave Doherty a third All-Ireland winners' medal in four years.

1978 saw Doherty add a second National League title to his collection. A fifth consecutive Leinster winners' medal soon followed as Dublin accounted for Kildare. The eleven point victory in this game made Doherty's side the favourites to secure a remarkable third All-Ireland title in-a-row. While the game should have been an historic occasion, a rout ensued. The game is chiefly remembered for Mikey Sheehy's sensational goal. A free was awarded and the Kerry forward lobbed the ball over the head of Paddy Cullen, who was caught off his line arguing with the referee. New full-forward Eoin Liston entered the record books as he scored a hat-trick of goals. Pat Spillane played all over the field, including goalkeeper after Charlie Nelligan was sent off. At the full-time whistle, Kerry were the winners by 5-11 to 0-9. Doherty retired from inter-county football following this defeat.

== Death ==
Sean Doherty died on 7 July 2025, at the age of 78, one week short of his 79th birthday.

== Honours ==
Ballyboden Wanderers

- Dublin Junior Football Championship: 1968 (c)

Ballyboden St Enda's

- Dublin Intermediate Football Championship: 1971
- Dublin Intermediate Hurling Championship: 1974
- Dublin Junior Hurling Championship: 1973

Dublin

Played 105 times for Dublin

- All-Ireland Senior Football Championship: 1974 (c), 1976, 1977
- Leinster Senior Football Championship: 1974 (c), 1975 (c), 1976, 1977, 1978
- National Football League: 1975–76, 1977–78
- All-Star 1974

Sporting positions
Preceded by	Dublin Senior Football Captain; 1974–1975	Succeeded by Tony Hanahoe
Preceded by Kevin Heffernan	Dublin Senior Football Manager (jointly with Brian Mullins & Robbie Kelleher); 1986	Succeeded by Gerry McCaul
Achievements
Preceded by Billy Morgan (Cork)	All-Ireland SFC winning captain 1974	Succeeded by Mickey 'Ned' O'Sullivan (Kerry)
