= List of Dublin senior Gaelic football team captains =

This article lists players who have captained the senior Dublin county football team in the Leinster Senior Football Championship (SFC) and the All-Ireland Senior Football Championship (SFC). Unlike other counties the captain is not chosen from the club that has won the Dublin Senior Football Championship (SFC).

== List of captains ==
Year	Player	Club	National Titles	Provincial Titles
1974	Seán Doherty	Ballyboden St Enda's	All-Ireland SFC winning captain	Leinster SFC winning captain
1975	Seán Doherty	Ballyboden St Enda's		Leinster SFC winning captain
1976	Tony Hanahoe	St. Vincent's	All-Ireland SFC winning captain	Leinster SFC winning captain
1977	Tony Hanahoe	St. Vincent's	All-Ireland SFC winning captain	Leinster SFC winning captain
1978	Tony Hanahoe	St. Vincent's		Leinster SFC winning captain
1979	Tony Hanahoe	St. Vincent's		Leinster SFC winning captain
1980	Tommy Drumm	Whitehall Colmcille		
1981				
1982	Mick Holden	Cuala		
1983	Tommy Drumm	Whitehall Colmcille	All-Ireland SFC winning captain	Leinster SFC winning captain
1984	Tommy Drumm	Whitehall Colmcille		Leinster SFC winning captain
1985	Brian Mullins	St. Vincent's		Leinster SFC winning captain
1986	John O'Leary	O'Dwyer's		
1987				
1988				
1989	Gerry Hargan	Ballymun Kickhams		Leinster SFC winning captain
1990	Tommy Carr	Lucan Sarsfields		
1991	Tommy Carr	Lucan Sarsfields		
1992	Tommy Carr	Lucan Sarsfields		Leinster SFC winning captain
1993	John O'Leary	O'Dwyer's		Leinster SFC winning captain
1994	John O'Leary	O'Dwyer's		Leinster SFC winning captain
1995	John O'Leary	O'Dwyer's	All-Ireland SFC winning captain	Leinster SFC winning captain
1996	John O'Leary	O'Dwyer's		
1997	Keith Barr	Erin's Isle		
1998	Dessie Farrell	Na Fianna		
1999	Dessie Farrell	Na Fianna		
2000	Dessie Farrell	Na Fianna		
2001	Dessie Farrell	Na Fianna		
2002	Coman Goggins	Ballinteer St Johns		Leinster SFC winning captain
2003	Ciarán Whelan	Raheny		
2004	Ciarán Whelan	Raheny		
2005	Paddy Christie	Ballymun Kickhams		Leinster SFC winning captain
2006	Bryan Cullen	Skerries Harps		
2006	Colin Moran	Ballyboden St Enda's		Leinster SFC winning captain
2007	Colin Moran	Ballyboden St Enda's		Leinster SFC winning captain
2008	Alan Brogan	St Oliver Plunkett's/Eoghan Ruadh		Leinster SFC winning captain
2009	Paul Griffin	Kilmacud Crokes		Leinster SFC winning captain
2010	David Henry	Raheny		
2011	Bryan Cullen	Skerries Harps	All-Ireland SFC winning captain	Leinster SFC winning captain
2012	Bryan Cullen	Skerries Harps		Leinster SFC winning captain
2013	Stephen Cluxton	Parnells	All-Ireland SFC winning captain	Leinster SFC winning captain
2014	Stephen Cluxton	Parnells		Leinster SFC winning captain
2015	Stephen Cluxton	Parnells	All-Ireland SFC winning captain	Leinster SFC winning captain
2016	Stephen Cluxton	Parnells	All-Ireland SFC winning captain	Leinster SFC winning captain
2017	Stephen Cluxton	Parnells	All-Ireland SFC winning captain	Leinster SFC winning captain
2018	Stephen Cluxton	Parnells	All-Ireland SFC winning captain	Leinster SFC winning captain
2019	Stephen Cluxton	Parnells	All-Ireland SFC winning captain	Leinster SFC winning captain
2020	Stephen Cluxton	Parnells	All-Ireland SFC winning captain	Leinster SFC winning captain
2021	Jonny Cooper	Na Fianna		Leinster SFC winning captain
2022	James McCarthy	Ballymun Kickhams		Leinster SFC winning captain
2023	James McCarthy	Ballymun Kickhams	All-Ireland SFC winning captain	Leinster SFC winning captain
2024	James McCarthy	Ballymun Kickhams		Leinster SFC winning captain
2025	Con O'Callaghan	Cuala		
