= Paddy Cullen =

Dublin Gaelic football goalkeeper (1944–2025)

Personal information
- Native name: Pádraig Ó Cuilinn (Irish)
- Born: 18 October 1944 Stoneybatter, Dublin, Ireland
- Died: 6 February 2025 (aged 80)
- Occupation: Publican
- Height: 6 ft 2 in (188 cm)

Sport
- Sport: Gaelic football
- Position: Goalkeeper
Club
- Years: Club
- 1959–1982: O'Connell Boys
Club titles
- Dublin titles: 0
Inter-county*
| Years | County | Apps (scores) |
| 1966–1979 | Dublin | 43 (0–00) |
Inter-county titles
- Leinster titles: 6
- All-Irelands: 3
- NFL: 2
- All Stars: 4
- *Inter County team apps and scores correct as of 17:48, 18 November 2016.

Patrick Cullen (18 October 1944 – 6 February 2025) was an Irish Gaelic football manager and player. His league and championship career at senior level with the Dublin county team spanned thirteen years from 1966 to 1979.

== Career ==
Born in Stoneybatter but raised in the North Wall area of Dublin, Cullen was introduced to Gaelic football by the Christian Brothers at St Laurence O'Toole National School and later at the North Strand Vocational College. He joined the O'Connell Boys club straight after finishing his schooling and enjoyed a club career that spanned four decades from 1959 until 1982.

Cullen combined both Gaelic football and soccer in his youth and developed a reputation as a fine soccer goalkeeper when he played in the local street leagues. He later lined out with McNaughton's in the Athletic Union League. Cullen made his debut on the Gaelic football inter-county scene when he captained the inaugural Dublin under-21 team in 1964. Two years later he made his senior debut as a late call-up at full-forward against Derry during the 1966-67 league. After impressing in a tournament game at Easter 1967, Cullen was selected as Dublin's first-choice for the championship. Over the course of the next thirteen seasons, he won three All-Ireland medals, beginning with a lone triumph in 1974, followed by back-to-back titles in 1976 and 1977. He also won six Leinster medals, two National Football League medals and four All-Stars. Cullen played his last game for Dublin in September 1979.

After being chosen on the Leinster inter-provincial team for the first time in 1974, Cullen won his sole Railway Cup medal that year as a non-playing substitute.

In retirement from playing Cullen became involved in team management. He served as manager of the Dublin senior team from 1990 to 1992 and guided the team to Leinster and National Football League titles.

Cullen died after a long illness on 6 February 2025, at the age of 80.

== Career statistics ==
| Team | Season | Leinster | | All-Ireland | | Total | |
| Team | Season | Apps | Score | Apps | Score | Apps | Score |
|---|---|---|---|---|---|---|---|
| Dublin | 1967 | 1 | 0-00 | 0 | 0-00 | 1 | 0-00 |
| Dublin | 1968 | 1 | 0-00 | 0 | 0-00 | 1 | 0-00 |
| Dublin | 1969 | 2 | 0-00 | 0 | 0-00 | 2 | 0-00 |
| Dublin | 1970 | 1 | 0-00 | 0 | 0-00 | 1 | 0-00 |
| Dublin | 1971 | 1 | 0-00 | 0 | 0-00 | 1 | 0-00 |
| Dublin | 1972 | 2 | 0-00 | 0 | 0-00 | 2 | 0-00 |
| Dublin | 1973 | 3 | 0-00 | 0 | 0-00 | 3 | 0-00 |
| Dublin | 1974 | 5 | 0-00 | 2 | 0-00 | 7 | 0-00 |
| Dublin | 1975 | 3 | 0-00 | 2 | 0-00 | 5 | 0-00 |
| Dublin | 1976 | 3 | 0-00 | 2 | 0-00 | 5 | 0-00 |
| Dublin | 1970 | 3 | 0-00 | 2 | 0-00 | 5 | 0-00 |
| Dublin | 1978 | 3 | 0-00 | 2 | 0-00 | 5 | 0-00 |
| Dublin | 1979 | 3 | 0-00 | 2 | 0-00 | 5 | 0-00 |
| Total | | 31 | 0-00 | 12 | 0-00 | 43 | 0-00 |

== Honours ==
=== Player ===
Dublin

- All-Ireland Senior Football Championship: 1974, 1976, 1977
- Leinster Senior Football Championship: 1974, 1975, 1976, 1977, 1978, 1979
- National Football League: 1975–76, 1977–78

Leinster

- Railway Cup: 1974

=== Manager ===
Dublin

- Leinster Senior Football Championship: 1992
- National Football League: 1990–91

Sporting positions
| Preceded by Gerry McCaul | Dublin Senior Football Manager; 1990–1992 | Succeeded by Pat O'Neill |
