= Jimmy Keaveney =

Dublin Gaelic footballer (born 1945)

Personal information
- Native name: Séamus Mac Géibheannaigh/ Ó Géibheannaigh (Irish)
- Born: 12 February 1945 (age 81) Whitehall, Dublin, Ireland
- Occupation: Sales director
- Height: 6 ft 0 in (183 cm)

Sport
- Sport: Gaelic football
- Position: Full-forward
Club
- Years: Club
- St Vincent's
Club titles
- Dublin titles: 10
- Leinster titles: 2
- All-Ireland Titles: 1
Inter-county
Years	County	Apps (scores)
1964–1980	Dublin	42 (15–182)
Inter-county titles
- Leinster titles: 7
- All-Irelands: 3
- NFL: 2
- All Stars: 3

James Keaveney (born 12 February 1945) is an Irish former Gaelic footballer. His league and championship career at senior level with the Dublin county team spanned sixteen seasons from 1964 to 1980. Keaveney is widely regarded as one of Dublin's greatest-ever players.

Born in Whitehall, Dublin, Keaveney's first sporting interest was in association football; however, he was later introduced to Gaelic games by his Belfast-born father. He was educated at St Joseph's Secondary School in Fairview where he favoured hurling over Gaelic football.

Keaveney first played competitive Gaelic games at underage levels with the St Vincent's club before later joining the club's senior team. Between 1964 and 1981 he won ten county football championship medals, and he won an All-Ireland Senior Club Football Championship medal in 1976. Keaveney also won two Leinster medals and three county hurling championship medals.

Keaveney made his debut on the inter-county scene when he was selected for the Dublin minor and under-21 teams. He made his senior debut during the 1964-65 league. Over the course of the following sixteen seasons, Keaveney won three All-Ireland medals, beginning with a lone triumph in 1974, followed by back-to-back championships in 1976 and 1977. He also won seven Leinster medals, two National Football League medals and was named Footballer of the Year in 1976 and 1977. He played his last game for Dublin in February 1980.

== Playing career ==
=== Club ===
Keaveney played his club football with the famous St Vincent's club in Dublin and had much success during a career that spanned two decades.

He first came to prominence on the club scene as a member of the senior team in the early 1960s. In 1964 Keaveney lined out in his first county championship decider. Nearby rivals O'Toole's provided the opposition, however, at the full-time whistle St Vincent's were the champions and Keaveney picked up his first county senior championship winners' medal.

After surrendering their title in 1965 St Vincent's were back in the county championship decider again in 1966. Seán McDermott's were the opponents; however, Keaveney's side were too strong and regained the title. Both sides met again in 1967, and the result was the same. A win for St. Vincent's gave Keaveney a third county winners' medal in four years.

St. Vincent's failed to make any impact over the next few years and, after losing the county final of 1969, Keaveney's side had a chance to atone in the championship decider of 1970. Raheny were the opponents on that occasion and a close game developed. At the end of the sixty minutes St Vincent's were the champions by 1–10 to 1-8 and Keaveney added a fourth county medal to his collection.

Keaveney's side dominated the county club championship again in 1971. A defeat of Croabh Chiaráin allowed St Vincent's to retain their county title for the second year in succession.

In 1972, St Vincent's set out to win a third county title in-a-row. College side UCD provided the opposition on that occasion and a close game developed. Goals at key moments by St Vincent's proved the difference as Keaveny's side won by 2–8 to 0–9. It was his sixth county winners' medal. St Vincent's subsequently represented the county in the provincial club series of games and even reached the final. Westmeath champions the Downs were the opponents. The game turned into a complete rout as Keaveney's side took complete control. A 6–10 to 2–5 scoreline gave St Vincent's a first Leinster club title. An All-Ireland final against Cork champions Nemo Rangers followed for the Dublin club. The sides were level six times in that game and a pointed free by Keaveney in the dying seconds secured a draw. The replay saw St. Vincent's being completely outclassed as Nemo won by 4–6 to 0–10.

St Vincent's lost out to UCD in the next two county finals, however, both sides met in the championship decider for a fourth consecutive year in 1975. Keaveney's side were awarded the title after the collegians gave them a walkover due to the final clashing with the university exams. A second provincial championship decider quickly followed for Keaveney. St Joseph's, the Laois county champions, were the opposition and were defeated by 3–9 to 1–8. It was Keaveney's second Leinster club winners' medal. A second All-Ireland club final appearance followed with Roscommon Gaels lining out in opposition. The game was a complete mismatch as St Vincent's secured a huge 4–10 to 0–5 victory. It was Keaveney's first All-Ireland club winners' medal.

Keaveney picked up a seventh county winners' medal in 1976 as St Vincent's retained their title after a narrow 3–12 to 1–15 victory over UCD. Their provincial run of success came to a halt in the early rounds of that series of games.

In 1977, St Vincent's made it three-in-a-row with another huge county final victory. In what was the club's ninth consecutive appearance in the county final, Keaveney collected a ninth winners' medal. In spite of some great displays in the county champions, St Vincent's were later defeated by Summerhill of Meath in the Leinster final.

St Vincent's went into decline over the next few years and Keaveney decided to retire from club football.

=== Inter-county ===
Keaveney first came to prominence on the inter-county scene with the Dublin senior inter-county team in the 1960s. After enjoying no success in the minor or under-21 grades, he lined out in the Leinster senior decider in 1965. Longford were the opponents on that occasion. A 3–6 to 0–9 scoreline gave Dublin the win and gave Keaveney a first Leinster winners' medal. Dublin were, however, later defeated by eventual runners-up Kerry in the Al-Ireland semi-final.

While Keaveney enjoyed success at an early age it was a short-lived experience. Over the next eight seasons Dublin failed on each occasion to even reach the Leinster decider. It was a frustrating downturn that eventually led to Keaveney announcing his retirement from inter-county football in 1973. At the age of twenty eight it was a premature decision.

In 1974 former All-Ireland winning captain Kevin Heffernan took over as manager of Dublin in time for the championship. Keaveney's retirement was short-lived as the new manager persuaded him to return to the team. The St. Vincent's man agreed and was immediately vindicated when Dublin reached the Leinster final of 1974. Archrivals Meath set out to stop 'the Dubs' claiming a first provincial title since 1965. The new look Dublin made no mistake in securing a 1–14 to 1–9 victory. It was Keaveney's second Leinster winners' medal. Dublin later surprisingly defeated All-Ireland title-holders Cork in the semi-final, thus booking a place in the All-Ireland final against Galway. The men from the west, who had been beaten in two of the previous three championship deciders, took a 1–4 to 0–5 lead at half-time, however, the real turning point of the game came in the 52nd minute. Galway were awarded a penalty which Liam Sammon stepped up to take. Goalkeeper Paddy Cullen made no mistake and saved the shot. "The Dubs" later went on to take the lead as Galway collapsed. A 0–14 to 1–6 scoreline resulted in a first All-Ireland winners' medal for Keaveney and a first for Dublin in eleven years. He capped off the year by collecting his first All-Star award.

Dublin proved that their success in 1974 was not a flash-in-the-pan by retaining the Leinster title in 1975 after an enormous 3–13 to 0–8 defeat of Kildare. Keaveney's side were the red-hot favourites going into the All-Ireland final against the youngest Kerry teams of all time. On a rain-soaked day John Egan and substitute Ger O'Driscoll scored two goals for Kerry and 'the Dubs' were ambushed by 2–12 to 0–11.

Dublin continued their dominance in 1976. After securing the National League title 'the Dubs' dominated the provincial championship once again. A narrow 2–8 to 1–9 defeat of Meath gave Keaveney a third consecutive Leinster winners' medal, his fourth in total. Once again it was Kerry who provided the opposition in the All-Ireland final, as one of the great rivalries of football entered a new chapter. Both sides were hoping for success, however, new 'Dub' Kevin Moran was causing havoc with the Kerry defence. Immediately after the game started he careered through the Kerry half-back and full-back lines, however, his shot at goal went wide. This set the pace for the rest of the match. John McCarthy finished a five-man move to score Dublin's first goal of the day. A converted penalty by Keaveney was followed by a third goal from Brian Mullins. A 3–8 to 0–10 scoreline gave Dublin the title and gave Keaveney a second All-Ireland winners' medal. Keaveney was surprisingly omitted from the All-Star selection, however, he was later named Texaco Footballer of the Year.

The 1977 Leinster final was a replay of the previous year with the result being the same. Meath provided some stiff opposition but fell short, eventually losing the game by 1–9 to 0–8. It was Keaveney's fourth consecutive Leinster title. Dublin later took on Kerry for the third consecutive year, however, this time it was in the All-Ireland semi-final. In one of the greatest games of football ever-played 'the Dubs' triumphed and booked a final apot against Armagh. An eight-goal thriller ensued, with Keaveney scoring the first of the day after just ninety seconds. He ended the day with a record 2-6 from play. Bobby Doyle soon followed with the first of his two goals while John McCarthy got a fifth. Armagh were awarded two penalties, but did not take a number of other goal-scoring opportunities. A 5–12 to 3–6 victory gave Dublin a second consecutive title and gave Keaveney a third All-Ireland winners' medal in four years. He was later presented with a second All-Star award while he retained his status as Texaco Footballer of the Year.

1978 saw Keaveney add a second National League title to his collection. A fifth consecutive Leinster winners' medal soon followed as Dublin accounted for Kildare. It was his sixth provincial medal in total. The eleven-point victory in this game made Keaveney's side the favourites to secure a remarkable third All-Ireland title in-a-row. While the game should have been an historic occasion, a rout ensued. The game is chiefly remembered for Mikey Sheehy's sensational goal. A free was awarded and the Kerry forward lobbed the ball over the head of Paddy Cullen, who was caught off his line arguing with the referee. New Kerry full-forward Eoin Liston entered the record books as he scored a hat-trick of goals. Pat Spillane played all over the field, including goalkeeper after Charlie Nelligan was sent off. At the full-time whistle Kerry were the winners by 5–11 to 0–9. In spite of surrendering the All-Ireland title Keaveney was later presented with a third All-Star. He subsequently retired from inter-county football.

== Career statistics ==
Team	Season	Leinster		All-Ireland		Total	
Team	Season	Apps	Score	Apps	Score	Apps	Score
Dublin	1965	3	1-03	1	0-00	4	1-03
Dublin	1966	1	0-02	0	0-00	1	0-02
Dublin	1967	1	0-06	0	0-00	1	0-06
Dublin	1968	1	0-00	0	0-00	1	0-00
Dublin	1969	1	0-00	0	0-00	1	0-00
Dublin	1970	1	0-03	0	0-00	1	0-03
Dublin	1971	1	0-04	0	0-00	1	0-04
Dublin	1972	1	1-00	0	0-00	1	1-00
Dublin	1973	2	0-02	0	0-00	2	0-02
Dublin	1974	4	1-24	2	0-12	6	1-36
Dublin	1975	3	1-23	2	0-15	5	1-38
Dublin	1976	3	4-11	2	2-07	5	6-18
Dublin	1977	3	0-18	2	2-09	5	2-27
Dublin	1978	3	1-17	2	1-14	5	2-31
Dublin	1979	3	1-12	0	0-00	3	1-12
Total		31	10-125	11	5-57	42	15-182

Awards
Preceded by John O'Keeffe (Kerry)	Texaco Footballer of the Year; 1976-1977	Succeeded by Pat Spillane (Kerry)
