= 1976–77 National Football League (Ireland) =

Gaelic football competition

League details
- Dates: October 1976 – 17 April 1977
- Teams: 32

League champions
- Winners: Kerry (13th win)
- Captain: John O'Keeffe
- Manager: Mick O'Dwyer

League runners-up
- Runners-up: Dublin
- Captain: Tony Hanahoe
- Manager: Tony Hanahoe (player-manager)

The 1976–77 National Football League was the 46th staging of the National Football League (NFL), an annual Gaelic football tournament for the Gaelic Athletic Association county teams of Ireland.

Kerry narrowly beat Dublin in the final.

== Format ==
All 32 counties of Ireland compete: 12 in Division 1 and 20 in Division 2.

Division 1 is composed of two groups of 6 teams (North and South). Each team plays the other teams in its group once, earning 2 points for a win and 1 for a draw.

- The first-placed team in each group advances to the NFL semi-finals.
- The second-placed team in each group advances to the NFL quarter-finals.
- The last-placed team is relegated.

Division 2 is composed of two groups of 10 teams (North and South). Each of these is further divided into two groups of 5. The top two in each group play semi-finals and finals, with the North champions and the South champions advancing to the NFL quarter-finals and being promoted.

== Group stage ==
=== Division One (North) ===
==== Play-offs ====
| 6 February 1977 For 1st Place | Mayo | 1-9 — 1-6 | Roscommon | Tuam |

| 13 March 1977 For 5th Place | Antrim | 2-7 — 0-10 | Sligo | Clones |

==== Table ====
| Team | Pld | W | D | L | Pts | Notes |
|---|---|---|---|---|---|---|
| Mayo | 5 | 4 | 0 | 1 | 8 | Qualified for knockout stages |
| Roscommon | 5 | 4 | 0 | 1 | 8 | Qualified for knockout stages |
| Tyrone | 5 | 3 | 0 | 2 | 6 |
| Derry | 5 | 2 | 0 | 3 | 4 |
| Antrim | 5 | 1 | 0 | 4 | 2 |
| Sligo | 5 | 1 | 0 | 4 | 2 | Relegated to Division Two of the 1977–78 NFL |

=== Division One (South) ===
==== Play-offs ====
| 13 March 1977 For 5th Place | Galway | 0-16 — 2-6 | Meath | O'Connor Park, Tullamore |

==== Table ====
| Team | Pld | W | D | L | Pts | Notes |
|---|---|---|---|---|---|---|
| Kerry | 5 | 4 | 1 | 0 | 9 | Qualified for Knockout Stages |
| Dublin | 5 | 3 | 1 | 1 | 7 | Qualified for Knockout Stages |
| Cork | 5 | 2 | 2 | 1 | 6 |
| Kildare | 5 | 2 | 0 | 3 | 4 |
| Galway | 5 | 0 | 2 | 3 | 2 |
| Meath | 5 | 0 | 2 | 3 | 2 | Relegated to Division Two of the 1977–78 NFL |

=== Division Two (North) ===
==== Group B play-offs ====
| 16 January 1977 For 1st Place | Cavan | 2-10 — 1-5 | Leitrim | Pearse Park, Longford |

| 30 January 1977 For 2nd Place | Donegal | 0-14 — 1-9; AET | Leitrim | Sligo |

==== Inter-group play-offs ====
| 6 February 1977 Semi-Final | Cavan | 0-12 — 0-9 | Armagh | Ballybay |

| 6 February 1977 Semi-Final | Donegal | 1-8 — 0-8 | Down | Dungannon |

| 6 March 1977 Final | Cavan | 0-12 — 0-9 | Donegal | Irvinestown |

==== Group A Table ====
| Team | Pld | W | D | L | Pts | Notes |
|---|---|---|---|---|---|---|
| Armagh | 4 | 3 | 1 | 0 | 7 |
| Down | 4 | 3 | 1 | 0 | 7 |
| Monaghan | 4 | 2 | 0 | 2 | 4 |
| Westmeath | 4 | 1 | 0 | 3 | 2 |
| Louth | 4 | 0 | 0 | 4 | 0 |

==== Group B Table ====
| Team | Pld | W | D | L | Pts | Notes |
|---|---|---|---|---|---|---|
| Cavan | 4 | 3 | 0 | 1 | 6 | Qualified for Knockout Stages; promoted to Division One of the 1977–78 NFL |
| Donegal | 4 | 3 | 0 | 1 | 6 |
| Leitrim | 4 | 3 | 0 | 1 | 6 |
| Fermanagh | 4 | 1 | 0 | 3 | 2 |
| Longford | 4 | 0 | 0 | 4 | 0 |

=== Division Two (South) ===
==== Inter-group play-offs ====
| 6 February 1977 Semi-Final | Laois | 2-9 — 2-8 | Waterford | Carlow |

| 6 February 1977 Semi-Final | Offaly | 4-14 — 2-2 | Wicklow | Croke Park, Dublin |

| 6 March 1977 Final | Offaly | 2-13 — 0-9 | Laois | Croke Park, Dublin |

==== Group A Table ====
| Team | Pld | W | D | L | Pts | Notes |
|---|---|---|---|---|---|---|
| Offaly | 4 | 3 | 1 | 0 | 7 | Qualified for Knockout Stages; promoted to Division One of the 1977–78 NFL |
| Laois | 4 | 2 | 1 | 1 | 5 |
| Clare | 4 | 2 | 0 | 2 | 4 |
| Tipperary | 4 | 2 | 0 | 2 | 4 |
| Limerick | 4 | 0 | 0 | 4 | 0 |

==== Group B Table ====
| Team | Pld | W | D | L | Pts | Notes |
|---|---|---|---|---|---|---|
| Waterford | 4 | 3 | 1 | 0 | 7 |
| Wicklow | 4 | 2 | 1 | 1 | 5 |
| Carlow | 4 | 2 | 0 | 2 | 4 |
| Wexford | 4 | 1 | 2 | 1 | 4 |
| Kilkenny | 4 | 0 | 0 | 4 | 0 |

== Knockout stage ==
=== Quarter-Finals ===
13 March 1977

| Roscommon | 1-4 – 0-5 | Offaly |

Athlone

13 March 1977

| Dublin | 2-12 – 1-7 | Cavan |

Pearse Park, Longford

=== Semi-finals ===
27 March 1977

| Mayo | 0-5 – 2-12 | Dublin |

Croke Park, Dublin

3 April 1977

| Kerry | 2-13 – 0-8 | Roscommon |

Croke Park, Dublin

=== Finals ===
17 April 1977
Final

| Kerry | 1-8 – 1-6 | Dublin |

Croke Park, Dublin
Attendance: 43,456
Referee: JJ Landers (Waterford)
