= Kevin Moran (footballer) =

Irish footballer

Personal information
- Date of birth: 29 April 1956 (age 70)
- Place of birth: Dublin, Republic of Ireland
- Height: 5 ft 11 in (1.80 m)

Youth career
- –1974: Rangers A.F.C.
- 1974–1975: Bohemians
- 1975–1976: UCD
- 1976–1978: Pegasus

Senior career*
Years	Team	Apps	(Gls)
1974–1975	Bohemians	1	(0)
1978–1988	Manchester United	231	(21)
1988–1990	Sporting Gijón	33	(0)
1990–1994	Blackburn Rovers	147	(10)
Total		412	(31)

International career
1980–1994	Republic of Ireland	71	(6)
- * Club domestic league appearances and goals

Kevin Moran
Personal information
- Native name: Caoimhín Ó Móráin (Irish)
- Born: 29 April 1956 (age 70) Dublin, Ireland
- Height: 5 ft 10 in (1.78 m)

Sport
- Sport: Gaelic football
- Position: Centre back
Club
- Years: Club
- 1972–1977: Good Counsel
Inter-county
- Years: County
- 1975–1978: Dublin
Inter-county titles
- Leinster titles: 4
- All-Irelands: 2
- NFL: 1
- All Stars: 1

Kevin Bernard Moran (born 29 April 1956) is an Irish former footballer who excelled at the top levels in two codes: Gaelic and the association brand. In the sport of hurling his earliest appearance in Croke Park saw him and his team mates from CBS James's Street lift the Fianna Fail Hurling Cup in 1967/68. Those early days set the seeds for his future success in Gaelic Football on the great Dubs team of the late 70s. Dublin county team, winning two All-Ireland Senior Football Championships with them, and in association football for his career with Blackburn Rovers, Manchester United and Ireland. In 1985 he became the first man to be sent off in an FA Cup Final.

== Early life ==
Moran grew up in Rialto, Dublin until his early teens, before he moved to the Long Mile Road in Walkinstown. While there, he attended James's Street CBS and Drimnagh Castle CBS where gaelic football was the dominant sport although association football proved to be the sport he played on the streets while growing up. During the period in which he played Gaelic football for Good Counsel and association football for Rangers, Bohemians and Pegasus, he had divided loyalties between the two sports, as both sports were then played on a Saturday.

== Gaelic football ==
In his native Ireland, Moran played at senior level for the Dublin county team. A former Dublin under-21 player, Moran was called up to the senior panel for the first time in 1976. He won two All-Ireland Championship medals with Dublin in 1976 and 1977. In the 1976 final, he helped Dublin to defeat (by 3–8 to 0–10) Kerry — the winner over Dublin in the 1975 final – and again in the 1977 semi-final, aided by new tactics which manager Kevin Heffernan introduced, and which hindered Kerry's tactic of pulling defenders forward and taking full advantage of the space behind the half-back line. The 1977 final resulted in a 5–12 to 3–6 victory over Armagh at Croke Park. Moran was awarded an All-Star for his performance in the 1976 championship.

Moran was also part of the 1976–77 side that won the National Football League for Dublin with a win over Derry in the final. He played his club football for Dublin-based GAA club Good Counsel.

The 1978 Championship began after Moran had joined Manchester United, but before the start of their 1978–79 season. Moran sneaked back to Dublin to win a last Leinster Final on 30 July, after which Kevin Heffernan and Tony Hanahoe persuaded United manager Dave Sexton to release Moran for the All-Ireland semi-final and final, downplaying the physical risks involved. Moran was injured while Dublin lost the semi-final, ending the prospect of further releases.

== Association football ==
With Bohs winning everything bar the FAI Cup in the 1974-75 League of Ireland season 18-year-old Moran did not have an opportunity for much game time and only made one League of Ireland appearance in the last game of the season on 17 April 1975. After Bohs he moved to UCD where in December 1975 he won the Collingwood Cup. In February 1976 Moran won the Universities Championship when he scored the winner for the Irish Universities against their Scottish counterparts Moran started playing as a full back with Bohemians F.C. and then Pegasus. He was spotted by Billy Behan, a Manchester United scout, who reported to Dave Sexton, and Moran signed for Manchester United in February 1978. He made his senior debut on 20 April 1979 against Southampton, and was a regular player in the first team by the time Ron Atkinson had succeeded Sexton as manager in June 1981. Despite not being the tallest of defenders, Kevin was known for his strong aerial ability and was a threat in the box from corners and set pieces.

Playing as a centre back, he won FA Cup medals with the club in 1983 and 1985.

Moran is notable for having been sent off in the 1985 FA Cup Final against Everton, the first player ever to be sent off in an FA Cup final, after bringing down Peter Reid with a two-footed foul tackle without playing the ball. He was later presented with the winner's medal that had at first been withheld.

After 10 years with United, Moran left Old Trafford as a 32-year-old in the summer of 1988, having played his final 18 months at the club under the management of Alex Ferguson. His first team opportunities had been limited since the arrival of Steve Bruce in December 1987.

He transferred to Sporting Gijón, where he remained for two seasons, making 33 appearances without scoring. During his time at Sporting Gijón, Moran roomed with promising youngster and future Real Madrid and Barcelona star Luis Enrique. While with the Spanish side he was named as the Senior International Player of the Year at the inaugural FAI International Football Awards in 1989.

In 1990, he returned to England to join Second Division Blackburn Rovers. He was an automatic choice in the first team, but endured a disappointing first season at Ewood Park as Rovers finished 19th in the Second Division. The following season was a huge success, however, as playoff victory ended the club's 26-year exile from the top division and secured their place in the new Premier League. Moran continued in his role as club captain as Rovers finished fourth in 1992–93 and runners-up in 1993–94, and finally retired at the end of the 1993–94 season – one year before Rovers won their first league title in 81 years. In both seasons preceding Moran's retirement, Rovers were beaten to the title by his old club Manchester United.

Moran made his debut for the Republic of Ireland against Switzerland in 1980 and played a key role in Ireland's unsuccessful attempt to qualify for the 1982 FIFA World Cup finals in Spain. He played 71 times for Ireland between 1980 and 1994, including UEFA Euro 1988 in Germany and the 1990 FIFA World Cup in Italy, and scored 6 goals. He was also a member of the Irish squad at the 1994 FIFA World Cup in the United States, despite being 38 years old and about to retire from playing completely, but did not play due to an injury he picked up before the tournament started.

== Later career ==
After retiring from football, Moran made a career in business. In 1994, he formed a football agency, Proactive Sports Management, with Paul Stretford and Jesper Olsen. His own clients include John O'Shea and Steve Finnan. Moran has also worked as a pundit on Irish television channel TV3.

Moran's brother Ray is a knee specialist known as "Dr Cruciate" and as a "'surgeon to the stars'", with clients including rock star Jon Bon Jovi and numerous athletes (such as Bernard Brogan, Colm Cooper, Brendan Maher, Alan Quinlan, Tara Ryan and Josh van der Flier). Moran sits on the board of his brother's Sports Surgery Clinic (SSC) in Santry, which opened in 2007.

== Honours ==
=== Gaelic football ===
Dublin

- All-Ireland Senior Football Championship: 1976, 1977
- Leinster Senior Football Championship: 1976, 1977, 1978

=== Association football ===
Manchester United

- FA Cup: 1982–83, 1984–85
- FA Charity Shield: 1983
- Football League Cup runner-up: 1982–83

Blackburn Rovers

- Football League Second Division play-offs: 1992

Individual

- FAI Senior International Player of the Year: 1989

== See also ==
- List of players who have converted from one football code to another
