= 1975–76 National Football League (Ireland) =

Gaelic football competition

League details
- Dates: October 1975 – 2 May 1976

League champions
- Winners: Dublin (4th win)
- Captain: Tony Hanahoe
- Manager: Kevin Heffernan

League runners-up
- Runners-up: Derry
- Captain: Peter Stevenson

The 1975–76 National Football League was the 45th staging of the National Football League (NFL), an annual Gaelic football tournament for the Gaelic Athletic Association county teams of Ireland.

Dublin defeated Derry in the final.

== Group stage ==
=== Division One ===
==== Group A play-offs ====
7 March 1976 For 2nd place	Cork	2-7 — 1-5	Kerry	Pairc Ui Chaoimh
				Referee: J Landers (Waterford)

==== Group B play-offs ====
7 March 1976 For 1st place	Derry	2-11 — 2-6	Galway	Croke Park
				Referee: M Meally (Kilkenny)

==== Inter-group relegation play-off ====
7 March 1976	Mayo	3-13 — 2-7	Offaly	Roscommon
				Referee: J Martin (Roscommon)

==== Group A Table ====
Team	Pld	W	D	L	Pts	Notes
Dublin	5	4	0	1	8	Qualified for Knockout Stages
Cork	5	3	1	1	7	Qualified for Knockout Stages
Kerry	5	3	1	1	7
Roscommon	5	3	0	2	6
Kildare	5	1	0	4	2
Offaly	5	0	0	5	0	Relegated to Division Two of the 1976–77 NFL

==== Group B Table ====
Team	Pld	W	D	L	Pts	Notes
Derry	5	4	0	1	8	Qualified for Knockout Stages
Galway	5	4	0	1	8	Qualified for Knockout Stages
Meath	5	3	0	2	6
Tyrone	5	1	1	3	3
Sligo	5	1	1	3	3
Mayo	5	1	0	4	2

=== Division Two ===
==== Table ====
Team	Pld	W	D	L	Pts	Notes
Antrim	5	5	0	0	10	Advanced to Knockout stage and promoted to Division One of the 1976–77 NFL
Down	5	4	0	1	8
Cavan	5	3	0	2	6
Fermanagh	5	2	0	3	4
Monaghan	5	1	0	4	2
Wicklow	5	0	0	5	0	Relegated to Division Three of the 1976–77 NFL

=== Division Three ===
==== Inter-group play-offs ====
7 March 1976 Final	Armagh	1-6 — 0-9	Clare	Croke Park
				Referee: P Kelly (Dublin)

14 March 1976 Final replay	Armagh	1-7 — 1-6	Clare	Croke Park
				Referee: P Kelly (Dublin)

==== Group A Table ====
Team	Pld	W	D	L	Pts	Notes
Armagh	6	6	0	0	12	Advanced to Knockout stage and promoted to Division Two of the 1976–77 NFL
Donegal	6	5	0	1	10
Laois	6	3	0	3	6
Leitrim	6	3	0	3	6
Longford	6	2	0	4	4
Louth	6	2	0	4	4
Westmeath	6	0	0	6	0

== Knockout stage ==
=== Quarter-finals ===
21 March 1976

Galway	0-12 – 1-5	Antrim

Croke Park, Dublin
Referee: R Barry (Meath)

21 March 1976

Cork	3-8 – 0-11	Armagh

Croke Park, Dublin
Referee: Seamus Aldridge (Kildare)

=== Semi-finals ===
4 April 1976

Dublin	1-11 – 0-12	Galway

Croke Park, Dublin
Attendance: 18,734
Referee: F Halbert (Cork)

11 April 1976

Derry	1-7 – 1-6	Cork

Croke Park, Dublin
Attendance: 7,659
Referee: R Barry (Meath)

=== Final ===
2 May 1976

Dublin	2-10 – 0-15	Derry

Croke Park, Dublin
Attendance: 33,845
Referee: John Moloney (Tipperary)
