= 1979 All-Ireland Senior Football Championship =

Football championship

Championship details
- Dates: 13 May – 16 September 1979
- Teams: 33

All-Ireland Champions
- Winning team: Kerry (25th win)
- Captain: Tim Kennelly
- Manager: Mick O'Dwyer

All-Ireland Finalists
- Losing team: Dublin
- Captain: Tony Hanahoe
- Manager: Kevin Heffernan

Provincial Champions
- Munster: Kerry
- Leinster: Dublin
- Ulster: Monaghan
- Connacht: Roscommon

Championship statistics
- No. matches played: 35
- Top Scorer: Mikey Sheehy (6–18)
- Player of the Year: Mikey Sheehy

The 1979 All-Ireland Senior Football Championship was the 93rd staging of the All-Ireland Senior Football Championship, the Gaelic Athletic Association's premier inter-county Gaelic football tournament. The championship began on 13 May 1979 and ended on 16 September 1979.

Kerry entered the championship as the defending champions.

On 16 September 1979, Kerry won the championship following a 3–13 to 1–8 defeat of Dublin in the All-Ireland final. This was their 25th All-Ireland title and their second in succession.

Kerry's Mikey Sheehy was the championship's top scorer with 6–18. He was also named as the Texaco Footballer of the Year.

== Leinster Championship format change ==
The second round of the Leinster football championship is dropped this year after 1 year.

== Results ==
=== Connacht Senior Football Championship ===
Quarter-finals

27 May 1979 Quarter-final	Galway	2–20 – 3–5	London	Pearse Stadium, Galway
	G McManus 0–10, P O'Neill 1–2, T Naughton 1–1, S Joyce 0–3, P McGettigan 0–2, P Rooney 0–1, B Talty 0–1.		E Creighton 3–1, M McGovern 0–4.	Referee: PJ McGrath (Mayo)

3 June 1979 Quarter-final	Sligo	0–12 – 1–13	Leitrim	Markievicz Park, Sligo
	J Kent 0–5, A Brennan 0–4, J Brennan 0–1, F Henry 0–1, M Laffey 0–1.		F Smith 0–5, P Holohan 1–0, M Martin 0–3, L Flynn 0–1, P McPartland 0–1, S Crossan 0–1, L Kelly 0–1, M Quinn 0–1.	Referee: T Cunningham (Galway)

Semi-finals

17 June 1979 Semi-final	Leitrim	1–10 – 3–12	Mayo	Páirc Sheáin Mhic Dhiarmada, Carrick-on-Shannon
	S Crossan 1–6, P McPartland 0–1, F Smith 0–1, M Martin 0–1, F Holohan 0–1.		J McGrath 3–1, G Cuddy 0–3, C Kelly 0–2, L Donoghue 0–2, P O'Brien 0–2, A Garvey 0–1, WJ Padden 0–1.	Attendance: 5,500; Referee: J Geraghty (Galway)

24 June 1979 Semi-final	Roscommon	3–11 – 1–11	Galway	Dr. Hyde Park, Roscommon
	A McManus 1–2, J O'Gara 1–1, S Kilbride 1–1, D Earley 0–3, M Freyne 0–2, M Menton 0–1, E McManus 0–1.		G McManus 1–3, R Lee 0–3, P Talty 0–2, J Hughes 0–1, B O'Donnell 0–1, S Joyce 0–1.	Attendance: 15,500

Final

15 July 1979 Final	Mayo	2–10 – 3–15	Roscommon	McHale Park, Castlebar
	J McGrath 2–5, L Donoghue 0–2, G Cuddy 0–1, H Gavin 0–1, T O'Malley 0–1.		T McManus 2–1, D Earley 0–5, M Finneran 1–1, J O'Connor 0–4, E McManus 0–2, M Freyne 0–1, J O'Gara 0–1.	Attendance: 23,700; Referee: P Gorman (Sligo)

=== Leinster Senior Football Championship ===
First round

13 May 1979 First round	Meath	6–19 – 0–3	Kilkenny	Páirc Tailteann, Navan
	B Cullen 4–0, F Barry 2–4, M Fay 0–4, E Mahon 0–4, M Ryan 0–3, F O'Sullivan 0–2, P Finnerty 0–2.		G Ryan 0–1, J O'Donnell 0–1, M Fitzgerald 0–1.

13 May 1979 First round	Carlow	1–16 – 4–7	Wexford	Nowlan Park, Kilkenny
	W Cullen 0–9, P Quirke 0–4, C Byrne 1–0, J Walsh 0–2, D Byrne 0–1.		M Magee 2–5, G Howling 1–0, J Wright 1–0, R Neville 0–1, P Neville 0–1.	Referee: M Meally (Kilkenny)

20 May 1979 First round	Louth	1–14 – 1–6	Longford	Croke Park, Dublin
	JP O'Kane 1–3, D Reid 0–3, S Reid 0–2, D Kelleher 0–2, E Sheelin 0–2, J McDonnell 0–1, G Nixon 0–1.		P Mullooly 1–2, D Shanley 0–1, J Murphy 0–1, T McCormack 0–1, D Shanley 0–1.	Attendance: 2,290

20 May 1979 First round	Laois	4–13 – 2–8	Westmeath	O'Connor Park, Tullamore
	T O'Brien 2–3, E Condron 2–0, E Whelan 0–3, G Browne 0–2, Robert Millar 0–2, W Brennan 0–1, G Lalor 0–1, D O'LOughlin 0–1.		J Farrell 1–1, M Kilcoyne 1–0, L Gillivan 0–3, W Lowry 0–1, T McCormack 0–1, J Quigley 0–1, J Mulligan 0–1.	Referee: J Gunning (Offaly)

27 May 1979 First round replay	Wexford	2–6 – 0–12 (aet)	Carlow	Nowlan Park, Kilkenny
	G Howlin 1–1, G Byrne 1–0, R Neville 0–2, M McGee 0–1, J Wright 0–1, G O'Connor 0–1.		P Quirke 0–4, W Cullen 0–3, E Ellis 0–2, J Walsh 0–1, C Byrne 0–1, M Moore 0–1.	Referee: M Meally (Kilkenny)

3 June 1979 First round second replay	Wexford	1–12 – 0–7	Carlow	Nowlan Park, Kilkenny

Quarter-finals

3 June 1979 Quarter-final	Dublin	4–16 – 0–4	Louth	Páirc Tailteann, Navan
	J Keaveney 1–5, D Hickey 1–5, P Ellis 1–1, B Doyle 1–0, J McCarthy 0–2, M Hickey 0–1, T Hanahoe 0–1, B Brogan 0–1.		A Wiseman 0–2, P Lennon 0–2.	Referee: R Barry (Meath)

10 June 1979 Quarter-final	Meath	0–12 – 1–9	Kildare	Croke Park, Dublin
	M Fay 0–5, C O'Rourke 0–3, F O'Sullivan 0–2, M Ryan 0–1, P Finnerty 0–1.		P Mangan 0–7, M Condon 1–0, H Hyland 0–1, P McCarthy 0–1.	Referee: T Jordan (Dublin)

10 June 1979 Quarter-final	Wicklow	3–11 – 0–13	Wexford	Dr. Cullen Park, Carlow
	J Lynch 2–2, T Foley 1–0, P Baker 0–3, T Murphy 0–2, P Burke 0–2, J McDonald 0–2.		G O'Connor 0–6, M McGee 0–3, G Howlin 0–2, G Byrne 0–1, L Fardy 0–1.	Referee: C Lally (Laois)

17 June 1979 Quarter-final replay	Meath	1–20 – 3–9	Kildare	Croke Park, Dublin
	M Ryan 1–7, K Rennicks 0–5, C o'Rourke 0–4, M Fay 0–3, P Smith 0–1.		G Power 2–0, P McCarthy 0–5, M Moore 1–0, P Mangan 0–3, M Condon 0–1.	Referee: T Jordan (Dublin)

17 June 1979 Quarter-final	Offaly	1–12 – 0–13	Laois	O'Connor Park, Tullamore
	S Lowry 0–5, M Connor 1–1, P Doyle 0–2, K Kilmurray 0–2, M Wright 0–1, G Carroll 0–1.		A O'Brien 0–4, E Whelan 0–4, W Brennan 0–3, D O'Loughlin 0–1, M Moore 0–1.	Referee: P Collins (Westmeath)

Semi-finals

1 July 1979 Semi-final	Dublin	3–13 – 2–7	Wicklow	St. Conleth's Park, Newbridge
	T Hanahoe 1–2, M Hickey 1–2, J Keaveney 0–5, B Mullins 1–0, P Ellis 0–2, B Brogan 0–1, F Ryder 0–1.		J Lynch 1–3, P Baker 1–2, P Burke 0–1, T Foley 0–1.	Attendance: 20,000; Referee: K Campbell (Meath)

8 July 1979 Semi-final	Meath	2–6 – 0–16	Offaly	Croke Park, Dublin
	C O'Rourke 1–2, E Barry 1–2, M Fay 0–1, F O'Sullivan 0–1.		S Lowry 0–10, M Connor 0–2, K Kilmurray 0–1, J Mooney 0–1, T Fitzpatrick 0–1, P Fenning 0–1.	Attendance: 21,404; Referee: P Kelly (Dublin)

Final

29 July 1979 Final	Dublin	1–8 – 0–9	Offaly	Croke Park, Dublin
	Bernard Brogan Sr 1–1, Jim Ronayne 0–3, Jimmy Keaveney 0-2f, Bobby Doyle and Mick Hickey (0-1f) each		Sean Lowry 0–6 (0-4f), Kevin Kilmurray 0–2, Matt Connor 0–1	Attendance: 52,348; Referee: Paddy Collins (Westmeath)

=== Munster Senior Football Championship ===
Quarter-finals

20 May 1979 Quarter-final	Limerick	1–9 – 1–15	Clare	Gaelic Grounds, Limerick

20 May 1979 Quarter-final	Tipperary	1–14 – 0–7	Waterford	Ned Hall Park, Clonmel
				Referee: A. Fogarty (Kerry)

Semi-finals

24 June 1979 Semi-final	Cork	2–18 – 0–5	Tipperary	Páirc Uí Chaoimh, Cork
	D Allen 0–8, C Kearney 1–2, D Barron 1–2, P Kavanagh 0–3, J Kerrigan 0–1, D McCarthy 0–1, T O'Reilly 0–1.		V O'Donnell 0–1, G McGrath 0–1, T McGrath 0–1, S Kearney 0–1, K Barron 0–1.	Referee: JJ Landers (Waterford)

1 July 1979 Semi-final	Clare	1–9 – 9–21	Kerry	Hennessy Memorial Park, Milltown Malbay
	S Moloney 0–4, D Casey 1–0, M Downes 0–3, N Normoyle 0–1, J McGrath 0–1.		P Spillane 3–3, G Power 2–2, E Liston 2–2, M Sheehy 1–4, V O'Connor 1–2, T Doyle 0–5, J O'Shea 0–2, J Egan 0–1.	Referee: J Dennigan (Cork)

Final

22 July 1979 Final	Kerry	2–14 – 2–4	Cork	Fitzgerald Stadium, Killarney
	Ger Power 2–4, Pat Spillane 0–5, Mikey Sheehy 0–3 (0-2f), Tommy Doyle and Sean Walsh 0–1 each		Dinny Allen 1–2 (0-1f), Jimmy Barry-Murphy 1–0, John Courtney (0–1 pen) and Christie Kearney 0–1 each	Attendance: 46,146; Referee: Pat Lane (Limerick); Man of the Match: Ger Power

=== Ulster Senior Football Championship ===
Preliminary round

20 May 1979 Preliminary round	Tyrone	2–9 – 2–5	Antrim	O'Neill Park, Dungannon
	O Hetherington 0–6, K Toner 1–0, B Donnelly 1–0, E Devlin 0–1, P Bell 0–1, G Devlin 0–1.		S McGourty 0–4, S Muldoon 1–0, PJ O'Hara 1–0, K McAllister 0–1.	Referee: S McManus (Fermanagh)

Quarter-finals

27 May 1979 Quarter-final	Monaghan	0–14 – 0–10	Down	St. Mary's Park, Castleblayney
	K Finlay 0–5, E Finnegan 0–3, K Treanor 0–2, B Brady 0–2, D Mulligan 0–2.		W Walsh 0–8, V McGovern 0–1, D Watson 0–1.

3 June 1979 Quarter-final	Armagh	5–3 – 1–7	Fermanagh	The Playing Fields, Lurgan
	P Loughran 2–1, C McKinestrey 1–0, J Gernan 1–1, S Devlin 1–0, J McKerr 0–1.		G McIlroy 1–3, G McGinnitty 0–4.	Referee: S Murray (Monaghan)

10 June 1979 Quarter-final	Cavan	1–13 – 2–12	Derry	Breffni Park, Cavan
	T Brady 1–2, D Donoghue 0–5, R Cullivan 0–3, S Duggan 0–1, P McNamee 0–1.		B Kelly 1–5, J McAfee 1–2, E Young 0–1, A Dallas 0–1, M Lynch 0–1, T Doherty 0–1, T McGuinness 0–1.	Referee: H Duggan (Armagh)

17 June 1979 Quarter-final	Donegal	1–11 – 1–9	Tyrone	Dean McGlinchey Park, Ballinascreen
	S Flynn 0–5, M Sweeney 1–0, S Bonner 0–3, P McGeehan 0–1, M Lafferty 0–1, E Sharkey 0–1.		K Toner 1–0, M Harte 0–3, O Hetherington 0–2, K McGarvey 0–2, P Donnelly 0–1, B Donnelly 0–1.

Semi-finals

24 June 1979 Semi-final	Monaghan	2–10 – 2–8	Armagh	Breffni Park, Cavan
	B Brady 1–1, D Mulligan 1–0, K Finlay 0–3, T Moyna 0–3, K Treanor 0–1, H Clerkin 0–1, G McCarville 0–1.		M Murphy 2–1, P Loughran 0–4, B Canavan 0–2, J Kernan 0–1.	Referee: J Heaney (Tyrone)

1 July 1979 Semi-final	Donegal	2–9 – 0–14	Derry	Healy Park, Omagh
	S Flynn 1–2, E Sharkey 1–0, M Gallagher 0–3, S Brennan 0–2, S Reilly 0–1, M Lafferty 0–1.		B Kelly 0–6, A Dallas 0–2, P Doherty 0–2, M Lynch 0–1, J McAfee 0–1, A McGuirk 0–1, J Hargan 0–1.	Referee: S McManus (Fermanagh)

Final

22 July 1979 Final	Monaghan	1–15 – 0–11	Donegal	St. Tiernach's Park, Clones
	K Finlay 1–9, D Mulligan 0–3, B Brady 0–2, H Clerkin 0–1.		S Flynn 0–4, E Sharkey 0–2, S Brennan 0–2, S Harpur 0–1, S Bonnar 0–1, K Keeney 0–1.	Attendance: 21,272; Referee: H Duggan (Armagh)

=== All-Ireland Senior Football Championship ===
Semi-finals

12 August 1979 Semi-final	Kerry	5–14 – 0–7	Monaghan	Croke Park, Dublin
	M Sheehy 3–5, E Liston 1–1, G Power 1–0, J Egan 0–3, S Walsh 0–2, V O'Connor 0–1, P Spillane 0–1, D Moran 0–1.		K Finlay 0–4, H Clerkin 0–1, E Hughes 0–1.	Attendance: 32,254; Referee: P Collins (Westmeath)

19 August 1979 Semi-final	Dublin	0–14 – 1–10	Roscommon	Croke Park, Dublin
	M Hickey 0–9, B Doyle 0–2, A O'Toole 0–2, J Ronayne 0–1.		J O'Connor 0–5, M Finneran 1–1, D Earley 0–3, A McManus 0–1.	Attendance: 53,402; Referee: J Dennigan (Cork)

Final

16 September 1979 Final	Kerry	3–13 – 1–8	Dublin	Croke Park, Dublin
	M Sheehy 2–6, J Egan 1–1, P Spillane 0–4, E Liston 0–1, J O'Shea 0–1.		J Ronayne 1–0, B Doyle 0–3, T Hanahoe 0–2, D Hickey 0–2, A O'Toole 0–1.	Attendance: 72,185; Referee: H Duggan (Armagh)

== Championship statistics ==
=== Top scorers ===
Overall

Rank	Player	County	Tally	Total	Matches	Average
1	Mikey Sheehy	Kerry	6–18	36	4	9.00
2	Kieran Finlay	Monaghan	1–21	24	4	6.00
3	Pat Spillane	Kerry	3–13	22	4	5.50
4	Joe McGrath	Mayo	5–6	21	2	10.50
4	Ger Power	Kerry	5–6	21	3	7.00

Single game

Rank	Player	County	Tally	Total	Opposition
1	Mikey Sheehy	Kerry	3–5	14	Monaghan
2	Bernard Cullen	Meath	4–0	12	Kilkenny
2	Pat Spillane	Kerry	3–3	12	Clare
2	Mikey Sheehy	Kerry	2–6	12	Dublin
2	Kieran Finlay	Monaghan	1–9	12	Donegal
6	Joe McGrath	Mayo	2–5	11	Roscommon
6	M. Magee	Wexford	2–5	11	Carlow
8	Eamon Creighton	London	3–1	10	Galway
8	Joe McGrath	Mayo	3–1	10	Leitrim
8	Eamon Barry	Meath	2–4	10	Kilkenny
8	Ger Power	Kerry	2–4	10	Cork
8	Mick Ryan	Meath	1–7	10	Kildare
8	Gay McManus	Galway	0–10	10	London
8	Seán Lowry	Offaly	0–10	10	Meath

=== Miscellaneous ===
- The Munster semi-final between Kerry and Clare had the highest score in the history of the Munster championship 9–21 to 1–9.
- Monaghan's 1–15 to 0–11 defeat of Donegal in the Ulster final gave them their first provincial title since 1938.
- Roscommon won the Connacht final for the third year in a row, the only time a team not Galway/Mayo have ever done so.
- As Dublin win their sixth Leinster title in a row they follow Wexford (1913–1918) and Kildare (1926–1931) who had previously done so.
