= 1977–78 National Football League (Ireland) =

Gaelic football competition

League details
- Dates: October 1977 – 23 April 1978

League champions
- Winners: Dublin (5th win)
- Captain: Tony Hanahoe
- Manager: Tony Hanahoe

League runners-up
- Runners-up: Mayo
- Captain: John P Keane
- Manager: Johnny Carey

The 1977–78 National Football League was the 47th staging of the National Football League (NFL), an annual Gaelic football tournament for the Gaelic Athletic Association county teams of Ireland.

Dublin beat Mayo in the final.

== Group stage ==
=== Division One (North) ===
==== Table ====
Team	Pld	W	D	L	Pts	Notes
Mayo	5	4	1	0	9	Qualified for Knockout Stages
Cavan	5	3	0	2	6	Qualified for Knockout Stages
Roscommon	5	2	1	2	5
Tyrone	5	2	1	2	5
Antrim	5	1	1	3	3
Derry	5	1	0	4	2	Relegated to Division Two of the 1978–79 NFL

=== Division One (South) ===
==== Table ====
Team	Pld	W	D	L	Pts	Notes
Dublin	5	5	0	0	10	Qualified for Knockout Stages
Kildare	5	3	1	1	7	Qualified for Knockout Stages
Cork	5	2	0	3	4
Galway	5	2	0	3	4
Kerry	5	1	1	3	3
Offaly	5	1	0	4	2	Relegated to Division Two of the 1978–79 NFL

=== Division Two (North) ===
==== Group A play-offs ====
22 January 1978 For 1st Place	Armagh	2-9 — 2-7	Down	Castleblaney

29 January 1978 For 2nd Place	Down	1-11 — 0-5	Louth	Castleblaney

==== Group B play-offs ====
22 January 1978 For 1st Place	Donegal	0-13 — 0-10	Fermanagh	Ballybofey

==== Inter-group play-offs ====
5 February 1978 Semi-Final	Armagh	2-7 — 0-7	Fermanagh	Omagh

5 February 1978 Semi-Final	Down	3-9 — 1-6	Donegal	Dungannon

19 February 1978 Final	Down	2-7 — 1-3	Armagh	Castleblaney

==== Group A Table ====
Team	Pld	W	D	L	Pts	Notes
Armagh	4	3	0	1	6
Down	4	3	0	1	6	Qualified for Knockout Stages; promoted to Division One of the 1978–79 NFL
Louth	4	3	0	1	6
Westmeath	4	1	0	3	2
Antrim	4	0	0	4	0

==== Group B Table ====
Team	Pld	W	D	L	Pts	Notes
Donegal	4	3	0	1	6
Fermanagh	4	3	0	1	6
Leitrim	4	2	0	2	4
Sligo	4	2	0	2	4
Longford	4	0	0	4	0

=== Division Two (South) ===
==== Group A play-offs ====
22 January 1978 For 1st Place	Laois	4-8 — 1-12	Meath	Tullamore
	E Whelan 2-1, L Scully 1-2, W Brennan 1-1, B Bohane 0-3, Tom Prendergast 0-1		Mick Fay 0-6, Fergus Fagan 1-1, Cormac Roe 0-2, O O'Brien, P Cromwell, Gerry McEntee 0-1 each	Referee: Johnny Geraghty (Galway)

==== Group B play-offs ====
29 January 1978	Wicklow	3-5 — 2-7	Carlow	Athy

==== Inter-group play-offs ====
5 February 1978 Semi-Final	Wexford	3-10 — 1-7	Meath	Newbridge

5 February 1978 Semi-Final	Laois	4-16 — 1-7	Wicklow	Athy
	Tom Prendergast 3-5, W Brennan 1-4, S Allen 0-3, E Whelan 0-2, B Bohane, F Hennessy 0-1 each			Referee: Martin Meally (Kilkenny)

5 March 1978 Final	Laois	1-12 — 1-6	Wexford	Carlow
	Tom Prendergast 1-2, Billy Bohane 0-5, Willie Brennan, Colm Browne 0-2 each, Liam Scully 0-1			Attendance: 12,000; Referee: Denis Guerin (Dublin)

==== Group A Table ====
Team	Pld	W	D	L	Pts	Notes
Laois	4	3	0	1	6	Qualified for Knockout Stages; promoted to Division One of the 1978–79 NFL
Meath	4	3	0	1	6
Tipperary	4	2	0	2	4
Clare	4	2	0	2	4
Limerick	4	0	0	4	0

==== Group B Table ====
Team	Pld	W	D	L	Pts	Notes
Wexford	4	4	0	0	8
Carlow	4	3	0	1	6
Wicklow	4	2	0	2	4
Waterford	4	1	0	3	2
Kilkenny	4	0	0	4	0

== Knockout stage ==
=== Quarter-finals ===
17 March 1978

Laois	4-9 – 2-10	Cavan
Tom Prendergast 2-1 Willie Brennan 0-5, Mick Moore 1-1, Stevie Allen 1-0, John Costello. Eamonn Whelan 0-1 each

Croke Park, Dublin
Attendance: 20,000
Referee: P Gorman (Sligo)

17 March 1978

Down	D – D	Kildare

Croke Park, Dublin

26 March 1978
Replay

Down	1-15 – 1-11 a.e.t.	Kildare

Croke Park, Dublin

=== Semi-finals ===
2 April 1978

Dublin	0-12 – 0-7	Laois
Bobby Doyle 0-3, Brian Mullins, Anton O'Toole 0-2 each, Tommy Drumm, Bernard Brogan, David Hickey, Fran Ryder, Pat O'Neill 0-1 each		W Brennan 0-3, L Scully, S Allen, B Bohane, T Prendergast 0-1 each

Croke Park, Dublin
Attendance: 20,000
Referee: Seamus Murray (Monaghan)

9 April 1978

Down	0-8 – 0-10	Mayo

Croke Park, Dublin

=== Final ===
23 April 1978

Dublin	2-18 – 2-13	Mayo

Croke Park, Dublin
Attendance: 39,623
Referee: Jimmy Dennigan (Cork)
