= 1978 All-Ireland Senior Football Championship =

Football championship

Championship details
- Dates: 7 May – 24 September 1978
- Teams: 33

All-Ireland Champions
- Winning team: Kerry (24th win)
- Captain: Denis "Ógie" Moran
- Manager: Mick O'Dwyer

All-Ireland Finalists
- Losing team: Dublin
- Captain: Tony Hanahoe
- Manager: Tony Hanahoe

Provincial Champions
- Munster: Kerry
- Leinster: Dublin
- Ulster: Down
- Connacht: Roscommon

Championship statistics
- No. matches played: 33
- Top Scorer: Jimmy Keaveney (2–31)
- Player of the Year: Pat Spillane

The 1978 All-Ireland Senior Football Championship was the 92nd staging of the All-Ireland Senior Football Championship, the Gaelic Athletic Association's premier inter-county Gaelic football tournament. The championship began on 7 May 1978 and ended on 24 September 1978.

Dublin entered the championship as the defending champions.

On 24 September 1978, Kerry won the championship following a 5–11 to 0–9 defeat of Dublin in the All-Ireland final. This was their 24th All-Ireland title and their first in three championship seasons.

Kerry's Pat Spillane was the choice for Texaco Footballer of the Year. Dublin's Jimmy Keaveney was the championship's top scorer with 2–31.

== Leinster Championship format change ==
In 1978 Round 2 returns to the Leinster football championship.

== Results ==
=== Connacht Senior Football Championship ===
Quarter-finals

21 May 1978 Quarter-final	Sligo	4–13 – 2–10	London	Markievicz Park, Sligo
	M Hoey 3–8, M McIntyre 1–0, J Kent 0–3, T Carty 0–1, G McCarrick 0–1.		T Quirke 1–2, D Keating 1–1, B O'Connell 0–2, J Flynn 0–2, T Flynn 0–2, N McCarthy 0–1, M McGovern 0–1, P Canavan 0–1.	Referee: S McMahon (Roscommon)

28 May 1978 Quarter-final	Mayo	2–18 – 1–8	Leitrim	James Stephens Park, Ballina
	B Fitzpatrick 1–3, J Mallee 1–3, WJ Padden 0–4, W Nally 0–3, D Dolan 0–3, R Bell 0–3.		M Tighe 0–5, M Kiernan 1–1, B Wrynne 0–2.	Referee: J Geraghty (Galway)

Semi-finals

11 June 1978 Semi-final	Galway	1–11 – 1–8	Sligo	Tuam Stadium, Tuam
	S Joyce 1–2, G McManus 0–4, T Naughton 0–2, P Lee 0–1, J Hughes 0–1, B Talty 0–1.		F Henry 1–1, M Hoey 0–4, M Kearins 0–1, M McIntyre 0–1, J Kearins 0–1.	Referee: PJ McGrath (Mayo)

18 June 1978 Semi-final	Roscommon	1–12 – 1–9	Mayo	Dr. Hyde Park, Roscommon
	J O'Connor 1–1, M Finneran 0–4, M Menton 0–3, A McManus 0–2, D Earley 0–1, S Kilbride 0–1.		L Donoghue 1–0, W Fitzpatrick 0–3, G Cuddy 0–2, W Nally 0–1, R Bell 0–1, D Dolan 0–1, WJ Padden 0–1.	Referee: T Cunningham (Galway)

Final

9 July 1978 Final	Galway	0–9 – 2–7	Roscommon	Pearse Stadium, Galway
	P McGettigan 0–2, T Naughton 0–2, G McManus 0–2, S Joyce 0–1, J Duggan 0–1, B Talty 0–1.		M Freyne 2–0, D Earley 0–3, S Kilbride 0–2, M Finneran 0–1, L O'Gara 0–1.	Attendance: 17,000; Referee: PJ McGrath (Mayo)

=== Leinster Senior Football Championship ===
First round

7 May 1978 First round	Carlow	5–8 – 3–9	Westmeath	O'Moore Park, Portlaoise
	B Doyle 3–2, D Byrne 1–1, T Geoghegan 1–0, M Moore 0–2, W Cullen 0–2, P Foley 0–1.		K Geraghty 1–5, J Keane 1–0, T McCormack 1–0, A O'Halloran 0–1, T Doyle 0–1, M Lowry 0–1, W Lowry 0–1.

7 May 1978 First round	Wicklow	2–16 – 0–3	Kilkenny	Geraldine Park, Athy
	P Doyle 2–5, P O'Toole 0–3, T Murphy 0–2, P Baker 0–2, O Doyle 0–2, M Dunne 0–1, T Foley 0–1.		M Brennan 0–2, C Heffernan 0–1.

Second round

28 May 1978 Second round	Wicklow	4–15 – 1–8	Wexford	Dr. Cullen Park, Carlow

4 June 1978 Second round	Kildare	4–15 – 1–8	Louth	Páirc Tailteann, Navan
	T Carew 1–6, G Power 2–0, M Condon 1–1, D Hyland 0–2, P Magan 0–2, J Geoghegan 0–1, H Hyland 0–1, F Mulligan 0–1, J Crofton 0–1.		D Kelleher 1–0, P Lennon 0–3, JP O'Kane 0–2, P McEvoy 0–1, D McCoy 0–1, E Judge 0–1.	Referee: P Kelly (Dublin)

4 June 1978 Second round	Offaly	2–12 – 0–8	Longford	Cusack Park, Mullingar
				Attendance: 3000; Referee: C Conlon

Quarter-finals

18 June 1978 Quarter-final	Dublin	6–15 – 2–9	Carlow	Croke Park, Dublin
	J McCarthy 3–7, T Hanahoe 1–4, D Hickey 1–0, B Doyle 1–0, J Keaveney 0–3, F Ryder 0–1.		P Kavanagh 0–5, D Byrne 1–1, T Geoghegan 1–0, P Foley 0–1, P Quirke 0–1, P Browne 0–1.

18 June 1978 Quarter-final	Kildare	3–14 – 1–12	Meath	Croke Park, Dublin
	P Mangan 1–3, M Condon 1–2, T Carew 1–2, H Hyland 0–4, G Power 0–2, J Geoghegan 0–1.		M Fay 0–7 (0-4f), G McEntee 1–0, K Rennicks 0–2, E Magee 0–1, C O'Rourke 0–1, J Cassells 0–1.	Referee: N O'Donoghue (Dublin)

25 June 1978 Quarter-final	Laois	2–8 – 0–16	Offaly	O'Moore Park, Portlaoise
				Attendance: 20,000; Referee: M Meally (Kilkenny)

Semi-finals

2 July 1978 Semi-final	Kildare	4–14 – 2–6	Wicklow	Croke Park, Dublin
	M Condon 2–1, J Geoghegan 1–3, T Carew 0–6, H Hyland 1–1, P Dunny 0–1, P Mangan 0–1, J Crofton 0–1.		T Foley 1–1, T Murphy 1–1, O Doyle 0–1, M Coffey 0–1, P O'Toole 0–1, P Byrne 0–1.	Referee: D Guerin (Dublin)

9 July 1978 Semi-final	Dublin	2–9 – 0–12	Offaly	O'Moore Park, Portlaoise
	J Keaveney 1–7, J McCarthy 1–1, B Doyle 0–1.		J Mooney 0–3, V Henry 0–3, P Doyle 0–2, W Bryan 0–1, M Connor 0–1, M Wright 0–1, P Fenning 0–1.	Attendance: 22,000; Referee: S Murray (Roscommon)

Final

30 July 1978 Final	Dublin	1–17 – 1–6	Kildare	Croke Park, Dublin
	Jimmy Keaveney 0–7 (0-3f, 1 '45), Tony Hanahoe 1–2, Anton O'Toole 0–2, Robbie Kelleher, Brian Mullins, Bernard Brogan Sr, John McCarthy, Padraig Hogan, Paddy Gogarty 0–1 each		Denis Dalton 1–0, Tommy Carew 0–3 (0-2f), Mick Condon 0–2, Pat Dunny 0–1	Attendance: 53,512; Referee: Paddy Collins (Westmeath)

=== Munster Senior Football Championship ===
Quarter-finals

28 May 1978 Quarter-final	Clare	0–19 – 1–4	Limerick	Páirc Uí Seancháin, Dunbeg
	M Downes 0–5, A Moloney 0–4, J McGrath 0–3, T Curtin 0–3, M Keogh 0–2, N Roche 0–1, B O'Reilly 0–1.		K Rennteon 1–1, M Quish 0–1, C O'Connor 0–1, G Murray 0–1.	Referee: G Ryan (Tipperary)

28 May 1978 Quarter-final	Tipperary	1–16 – 2–13	Waterford	Ned Hall Park, Clonmel
	C Murphy 0–8, H Mulhaire 1–2, V O'Donnell 0–2, G McGrath 0–2, M McCarthy 0–1, J Ryan 0–1.		J Hennessy 1–0, T Casey 0–6, M Hackett 1–1, P Keating 0–2, P Murphy 0–2, B Fleming 0–2.	Referee: B Cross (Limerick)

4 June 1978 Quarter-final replay	Waterford	2–19 – 2–17 (aet)	Tipperary	Fraher Field, Dungarvan
	T Casey 0–12, B Fleming 1–1, J McGrath 1–1, J Hennessy 0–2, M Hackett 0–2, P Keating 0–1.		H Mulhaire 1–4, S McCarthy 1–3, C Murphy 0–6, J Ryan 0–2, E McGrath 0–1, T Kavanagh 0–1.	Referee: B Cross (Limerick)

Semi-finals

11 June 1978 Semi-final	Cork	3–16 – 0–11	Clare	Páirc Uí Chaoimh, Cork
	J Barry-Murphy 2–1, R Cummins 1–3, D Allen 0–5, D Barron 0–2, S Murphy 0–2, C Ryan 0–1, D McCarthy 0–1, D Hunt 0–1.		A Moloney 0–5, B O'Reilly 0–2, M Roche 0–1, T Cartin 0–1, M Keogh 0–1, M Downes 0–1.	Referee: W Fogarty (Kerry)

18 June 1978 Semi-final	Kerry	4–27 – 2–8	Waterford	Fitzgerald Stadium, Killarney
	M Sheehy 2–8, P Spillane 2–5, J Egan 0–5, G Power 0–3, T Doyle 0–3, J Mulvihill 0–2, M O'Sullivan 0–1.		B Fleming 2–0, R Dunford 0–2, T Casey 0–2, T Keating 0–1, M Hackett 0–1, J McGrath 0–1, P Keating 0–1.	Referee: P O'Donovan (Cork)

Final

16 July 1978 Final	Cork	3–7 – 3–14	Kerry	Páirc Uí Chaoimh, Cork
	Dinny Allen 2–2 (1–0 pen, 0-2f), Jimmy Barry-Murphy 1–0, Ray Cummins 0–3 (0-2f), Tom Creedon (1 '50) and Dennis Lenihan 0–1 each		Mikey Sheehy 2–5 (0-4f), Pat Spillane 0–4, Ger Power 1–0, Tommy Doyle and John Egan 0–2 each, Paidi Ó Sé 0–1	Attendance: 46,000; Referee: Sean O'Connor (Limerick)

=== Ulster Senior Football Championship ===
Preliminary round

28 May 1978 Preliminary round	Derry	3–12 – 0–7	Donegal	Dean McGlinchey Park, Ballinascreen
	G Keane 1–6, J Fullerton 1–1, B O'Neill 1–0, M Lynch 0–2, B Kelly 0–1, D Kearney 0–1, G McIlhinney 0–1.		S Bonnar 0–2, F Rush 0–2, A Gallagher 0–1, S Marley 0–1, M Carney 0–1.	Referee: H McPoland (Antrim)

Quarter-finals

21 May 1978 Quarter-final	Antrim	4–6 – 2–4	Monaghan	Casement Park, Belfast
	G Armstrong 2–1, M Darragh 2–0, K Gough 0–2, A Hamill 0–1, P O'Hare 0–1, S McGourty 0–1.		G Brannigan 1–1, E Tavey 1–0, K Treanor 0–1, P Kerr 0–1, D Mulligan 0–1.	Referee: J Gribben (Down)

11 June 1978 Quarter-final	Cavan	0–16 – 0–9	Armagh	Breffni Park, Cavan
	D Donoghue 0–6, P McGovern 0–3, R Cullivan 0–2, A King 0–1, O Leddy 0–1, M Goldrick 0–1, F McNamee 0–1, JJ Martin 0–1.			Referee: S Murray (Monaghan)

11 June 1978 Quarter-final	Fermanagh	2–7 – 0–14	Down	St. Molaise Park, Irvinestown
	G McElroy 2–1, K Corrigan 0–2, J Donnelly 0–1, E McPartland 0–1, P McGinnity 0–1.		C McAlarney 0–3, S Fearon 0–3, P Heaney 0–2, E Toner 0–2, C Digney 0–2, Cunningham 0–1, V McGovern 0–1.	Referee: H Duggan (Armagh)

18 June 1978 Quarter-final	Derry	3–11 – 0–9	Tyrone	The Playing Fields, Lurgan

Semi-finals

2 July 1978 Semi-final	Down	1–14 – 2–8	Derry	Casement Park, Belfast
	P Rooney 0–6, V McGovern 0–4, B Gardner 1–0, M Cunningham 0–3, J Digney 0–1.		D Kearney 0–4, B O'Neill 1–0, J Hargan 1–0, G Keane 0–2, M Lynch 0–1, T McGuinness 0–1.

9 July 1978 Semi-final	Cavan	2–13 – 1–10	Antrim	St. Mary's Park, Castleblayney
	P McNamee 1–2, M Goldrick 0–4, C O'Keeffe 1–0, R Cullivan 0–3, P McGovern 0–2, D Donoghue 0–1, O Martin 0–1.		C Smith 1–1, M Darragh 0–4, G Armstrong 0–1, A McQuillan 0–1, D Laverty 0–1, J McKiernan 0–1, K Gough 0–1.	Referee: H Duggan (Armagh)

Final

23 July 1978 Final	Down	2–19 – 2–12	Cavan	St. Tiernach's Park, Clones
	J Byrne 1–3, E McGivern 1–1, C McAlarney 0–4, J Digney 0–3, L Austin 0–3, B Toner 0–2, M Cunningham 0–2, P Rooney 0–1.		A Brady 1–2, D Donohoe 0–5, C O'Keeffe 1–0, M Goldrick 0–3, R Cullivan 0–1, A King 0–1.	Attendance: 27,600; Referee: S Murray (Monaghan)

=== All-Ireland Senior Football Championship ===
Semi-finals

13 August 1978 Semi-final	Kerry	3–11 – 0–8	Roscommon	Croke Park, Dublin
	G Power 1–2, P Spillane 1–2, M Sheehy 0–4, P O'Mahony 1–0, J Egan 0–1, E Liston 0–1, J O'Shea 0–1.		J O'Connor 0–4, M Finneran 0–2, D Earley 0–1, J O'Gara 0–1.	Attendance: 25,594; Referee: S Aldridge (Kildare)

20 August 1978 Semi-final	Dublin	1–16 – 0–8	Down	Croke Park, Dublin
	J Keaveney 1–6, B Brogan 0–3, J McCarthy 0–2, B Doyle 0–2, A O'Toole 0–1, G O'Driscoll 0–1, P'O'Neill 0–1.		W Walsh 0–5, C Digney 0–1, C McAlarney 0–1, L Austin 0–1.	Attendance: 51,666; Referee: T Moran (Leitrim)

Final

24 September 1978 Final	Kerry	5–11 – 0–9	Dublin	Croke Park, Dublin
	E Liston 3–2, M Sheehy 1–4, J Egan 1–2, J O'Shea 0–1, G Power 0–1, P Spillane 0–1.		J Keaveney 0–8, B Brogan 0–1.	Attendance: 71,503; Referee: S Aldridge (Kildare)

== Championship statistics ==
=== Top scorers ===
Overall

Rank	Player	County	Tally	Total	Matches	Average
1	Jimmy Keaveney	Dublin	2–31	37	5	7.40
2	Mikey Sheehy	Kerry	5–21	36	4	9.00

=== Miscellaneous ===
- Kevin Moran, who had signed for Manchester United F.C. in February 1978, was given permission from the club to line out for Dublin in their Leinster semi-final defeat of Offaly. He remained on the panel for all of Dublin's subsequent games.
- On 28 May 1978, James Stephens Park, Ballina hosted its first championship game for 28 years it was the Connacht Quarter-final between Mayo and Leitrim.
- At the Ulster final between Down and Cavan, an official attendance of 27,600 is given, however, it is estimated that between 6,000 and 8,000 extra spectators were at the game.
- In the All-Ireland semi-final between Down and Dublin, the Down players wore black armbands as a mark of respect to the late Michael Cunningham. He was the father of the team's centre-forward Mickey Cunningham and died in the week leading up to the match.
- Kerry won their first title in a year ending with 8. They became the first county in either code to win at least one All Ireland in years ending with all ten digits.

== Roll of Honour ==
- Kerry – 24 (1978)
- Dublin – 20 (1977)
- Galway – 7 (1966)
- Wexford – 5 (1918)
- Cavan – 5 (1952)
- Cork – 4 (1973)
- Kildare – 4 (1928)
- Tipperary – 4 (1920)
- Down – 3 (1968)
- Meath – 3 (1967)
- Louth – 3 (1957)
- Mayo – 3 (1951)
- Offaly – 2 (1972)
- Roscommon – 2 (1944)
- Limerick – 2 (1896)
