= 1975 All-Ireland Senior Football Championship =

Football championship

Championship details
- Dates: 11 May – 28 September 1975
- Teams: 33

All-Ireland Champions
- Winning team: Kerry (23 win)
- Captain: Mickey "Ned" O'Sullivan
- Manager: Mick O'Dwyer

All-Ireland Finalists
- Losing team: Dublin
- Captain: Seán Doherty
- Manager: Kevin Heffernan

Provincial Champions
- Munster: Kerry
- Leinster: Dublin
- Ulster: Derry
- Connacht: Sligo

Championship statistics
- No. matches played: 35
- Goals total: 101 (2.8 per game)
- Points total: 762 (21. 7 per game)
- Top Scorer: Jimmy Keaveney (1–38)
- Player of the Year: John O'Keeffe

The 1975 All-Ireland Senior Football Championship was the 89th staging of the All-Ireland Senior Football Championship, the Gaelic Athletic Association's premier inter-county Gaelic football tournament. The championship began on 25 May 1975 and ended on 28 September 1975.

Dublin were the defending champions. London fielded a team in the senior championship for the first time.

On 28 September 1975, Kerry won the championship following a 2–12 to 0–11 defeat of Dublin in the All-Ireland final. This was their 23rd All-Ireland title, their first in five championship seasons.

Dublin's Jimmy Keaveney was the championship's top scorer with 1–38. Kerry's John O'Keeffe was the choice for Texaco Footballer of the Year.

== Format ==
The usual knock-out four-province setup was used. London played in the Connacht Senior Football Championship for the first time. Leinster Championship format change saw, Second round dropped this year first round winners go straight to the Quarter-finals. Kilkenny return to Leinster football for the first time since 1963.

== Rule change ==
As a result of a decision taken at the Gaelic Athletic Association's (GAA) annual congress the previous year, as of 1975 all provincial finals, All-Ireland semi-finals and the All-Ireland final itself were reduced to 70 minutes playing time. Prior to this all championship matches were eighty minutes in duration for the past 5 years.

== Results ==
=== Connacht Senior Football Championship ===
Quarter-finals

| 25 May 1975 Quarter-final | Mayo | 4–12 – 1–12 | London | MacHale Park, Castlebar |
| | G Feeney (0–1), T O’Malley (0–5), R Bell (1–1), G Farragher (1–1); M Henry (1–0), S Kilbride (1–2) sub E Webb (0–2). | | Jody Hickey 0–1 (Offaly), John Coffey 0–2 (Kerry), Gerry Farrelly 1–8 (Meath) & John Mahoney 0–1 (Kerry). | Referee: P Gorman (Sligo) |

| 1 June 1975 Quarter-final | Leitrim | 0–4 – 0–12 | Roscommon | Páirc Seán Mac Diarmada, Carrick-on-Shannon |
| | M Martin 0–1, M Tighe 0–1, B Wrynn 0–1, N Maxwell 0–1. | | E McManus 0–3, J O'Gara 0–2, J Keane 0–1, P Cox 0–1, P Lindsay 0–1, M Menton 0–1, G Mannion 0–1, J Finnegan 0–1, McNamara 0–1. |

Semi-finals

| 8 June 1975 Semi-final | Sligo | 1–13 – 0–6 | Galway | Markievicz Park, Sligo |
| | M Kearins 0–10, D Kerins 1–0, M Hoey 0–2, M Laffey 0–1. | | L Salmon 0–2, T Naughton 0–1, M Rooney 0–1, TJ Gilmore 0–1, M Hughes 0–1. | Referee: J Martin (Roscommon) |

| 15 June 1975 Semi-final | Roscommon | 1–9 – 1–12 | Mayo | Dr. Hyde Park, Roscommon |
| | BT Beegan 1–0, F McManus 0–2, J Keane 0–2, J Finnegan 0–1, M Menton 0–1, D Earley 0–1, P Cox 0–1, J O'Gara 0–1. | | G Farragher 1–4, T O'Mahony 0–2, JP Kean 0–2, T Welsh 0–1, W McGee 0–1, S Kilbride 0–1, R Bell 0–1. | Referee: T Moran (Leitrim) |

Finals

| 6 July 1975 Final | Sligo | 2–10 – 1–13 | Mayo | Markievicz Park, Sligo |
| | F Henry 1–3, D Kerins 1–1, M Kearins 0–4, M Laffey 0–1. | | JP Kean 1–1, T O'Malley 0–3, G Farragher 0–3, E Webb 0–2, W McGee 0–1, D McGrath 0–1, G Feeney 0–1, M Higgins 0–1. | Referee: T Moran (Leitrim) |

| 20 July 1975 Final replay | Mayo | 0–15 – 2–10 | Sligo | MacHale Park, Castlebar |
| | T O'Malley 0–4, D McGrath 0–3, M Higgins 0–2, E Webb 0–2, W McGee 0–1, S Kilbride 0–1, G Farragher 0–1, J Keane 0–1. | | M Kearins 1–4, D Kerins 1–1, M Hoey 0–4, J Stenson 0–1. | Referee: T Moran (Leitrim) |

=== Leinster Senior Football Championship ===
First round

| 11 May 1975 First round | Wexford | 2–8 – 1–10 | Carlow | Nowlan Park, Kilkenny |
| | W French 1–1, D Clancy 0–4, W Rowesome 1–0, P Cullen 0–2, G Howlin 0–1. | | D Byrne 1–1, W Cullen 0–2, B Hennessy 0–2, S King 0–1, P Quirke 0–1, S Shields 0–1, C Hughes 0–1, C Byrne 0–1. | Referee: M Meally (Kilkenny) |

| 25 May 1975 First round | Laois | 3–13 – 1–8 | Longford | O'Connor Park, Tullamore |
| | L Scally 0–6, J Hovendon 1–2, D Booth 1–0, S Allen 1–0, W Brennan 0–3, J Lalor 0–2. | | R Smith 1–1, J Hanniffy 0–2, S Kilroy 0–2, P Mullooly 0–1, S Lee 0–1, T McCormack 0–1. | Referee: M Spain (Offaly) |

| 1 June 1975 First round | Westmeath | 2–14 – 2–2 | Kilkenny | Geraldine Park, Athy |
| | P Whelan 1–3, M Galvin 1–0, S Conroy 0–3, V Murray 0–3, S Havin 0–2, B Smith 0–2, W Lowry 0–1. | | S Brennan 2–0, T Brennan 0–1, M Kelly 0–1. | Referee: E Long (Carlow) |

| 8 June 1975 First round | Louth | 2–22 – 2–6 | Wicklow | Croke Park, Dublin |
| | P McParland 0–7, P Gallagher 1–2, F Taaffe 1–1, E Shevlin 0–4, A Hoey 0–4, M McKeown 0–3, M McDonald 0–1. | | M O'Toole 0–4, T Kennedy 1–0, M Coffey 1–0, P Burke 0–1, B Laide 0–1. | Referee: P Kelly (Dublin) |

Quarter-finals

| 8 June 1975 Quarter-final | Dublin | 4–17 – 3–10 | Wexford | Dr. Cullen Park, Carlow |
| | J Keaveney 0–10, A Hanahoe 1–1, D Hickey 1–1, M Noctor 1–1, J McCarthy 1–1, B Doyle 0–2, A O'Toole 0–1. | | G Howlin 2–1, D Clancy 0–5, J Dunphy 1–0, J Cullen 0–1, W Ffrench 0–1, P Cullen 0–1, B Rowesome 0–1. | Referee: F Hayden (Carlow) |

| 15 June 1975 Quarter-final | Offaly | 0–13 – 0–13 | Laois | O'Connor Park, Tullamore |
| | T McTague 0–4, S Lowry 0–3, S Darby 0–3, E Lowry 0–1, P Fanning 0–1, K Kilmurray 0–1. | | L Scully 0–4, J Hovenden 0–3, J Lawlor 0–2, R Miller 0–2, S Allen 0–1, M Buggy 0–1. | Attendance: 20,000; Referee: P Collins (Westmeath) |

| 22 June 1975 Quarter-final | Louth | 0–15 – 1–9 | Meath | Croke Park, Dublin |
| | A Hoey 0–7, M McKeown 0–3, M McDonald 0–1, D Reid 0–1, P Gallagher 0–1, P McParland 0–1, B Gaughran 0–1. | | O O'Brien 0–7, M Kerrigan 1–1, P Traynor 0–1. | Referee: P Kelly (Dublin) |

| 29 June 1975 Quarter-final | Kildare | 1–15 – 1–8 | Westmeath | Páirc Tailteann, Navan |
| | A French 0–6, P Dunny 1–2, T Carew 0–4, M McKeever 0–1, H Hyland 0–1, J Donnelly 0–1. | | V Murray 0–5, B Smith 1–0, P Whelan 0–2, D Smith 0–1. | Referee: R Barry (Meath) |

| 29 June 1975 Quarter-final replay | Laois | 3–7 – 3–14 | Offaly | O'Moore Park, Portlaoise |
| | W Brennan 2–2, S Allen 1–1, L Scully 0–3, M Buggy 0–1. | | M Connor 3–2, T McTague 0–6, P Fenning 0–2, S Darby 0–2, E Lowry 0–1, K Kilmurray 0–1. | Attendance: 10,000; Referee: P Collins (Westmeath) |

Semi-finals

| 6 July 1975 Semi-final | Dublin | 3–14 – 4–7 | Louth | Páirc Tailteann, Navan |
| | J Keaveney 1–11, B Doyle 1–0, A O'Toole 0–2, T Hanahoe 1–0, R Kelleher 0–1. | | T Hoey 1–5, P McPartland 1–1, E Sheelan 1–0, R Brennan 1–0, D Reid 0–1. | Attendance: 31,000; Referee: P Collins (Westmeath) |

| 13 July 1975 Semi-final | Offaly | 0–11 – 2–11 | Kildare | Croke Park, Dublin |
| | T McTague 0–9, S Darby 0–2. | | J Donnelly 0–7, R O'Sullivan 1–1, P Dunny 1–0, B O'Doherty 0–2, H Hyland 0–1. | Attendance: 17,213; Referee: P Kelly (Dublin) |

Final

| 27 July 1975 Final | Dublin | 3–13 – 0–8 | Kildare | Croke Park, Dublin |
| | Brian Mullins 2–0, David Hickey 1–2, Paddy Gogarty 0–4, Bobby Doyle and Jimmy Keaveney (0-1f) 0–2 each, Bernard Brogan Sr, Tony Hanahoe, Anton O'Toole 0–1 each | | Jack Donnelly 0-3f, Pat Dunny 0–2, Jack Balfe (1 '50), Tommy Carew, Ray O'Sullivan 0–1 each | Attendance: 44,182; Referee: Brendan Hayden (Carlow) |

=== Munster Senior Football Championship ===
Quarter-finals

| 1 June 1975 Quarter-final | Tipperary | 7–18 – 1–5 | Limerick | Emly Sportsfield, Emly |
| | J Kehoe 4–0, M Keating 0–6, P Hanrahan 1–2, G Stapleton 1–2, J Tracey 1–0, L Myles 0–3, C O'Flherty 0–2, G McGrath 0–1. | | T Bradley 1–1, P Ahern 0–2, L Lawlor 0–2. | Referee: J Dennison (Cork) |

| 1 June 1975 Quarter-final | Clare | 1–15 – 1–10 | Waterford | The Cricket Field, Kilrush |
| | S Moloney 1–3, J O'Halloran 0–4, M Greene 0–4, J McMahon 0–2, T Tubridy 0–2. | | M Power 1–1, V Kirwin 0–4, T Casey 0–2, S Ahern 0–1, M Hackett 0–1, J Hennessy 0–1. | Referee: PJ O'Halloran |

Semi-finals

| 15 June 1975 Semi-final | Tipperary | 0–9 – 3–13 | Kerry | Ned Hall Park, Clonmel |
| | C O'Flaherty 0–4, L Myles 0–3, M Keating 0–2. | | J Egan 2–3, B Lynch 0–5, R Prenderville 1–0, P Spillane 0–3, M Sheehy 0–2. | Referee: F Halbert (Cork) |

| 15 June 1975 Semi-final | Clare | 0–7 – 1–16 | Cork | Páirc Uí Seancháin, Doonbeg |
| | J McMahon 0–4, B O'Reilly 0–1, M Downes 0–1. | | T Murphy 0–8, D Barron 1–3, D Long 0–2, R Cummins 0–2, J Barrett 0–1. | Referee: B Cross (Limerick) |

Final

| 13 July 1975 Final | Kerry | 1–14 – 0–7 | Cork | Fitzgerald Stadium, Killarney |
| | Brendan Lynch 0–4 (0-3f), Pat Spillane 1–1, Mikey Sheehy 0–3 (0-2f), John Egan 0–2, Pat McCarthy, Mickey O'Sullivan, Denis Moran, Ger O'Driscoll 0–1 each | | Dinny Allen 0–3, Ray Cummins 0–2, Tony Murphy and Declan Barron 0–1 each | Attendance: 43,295; Referee: Brendan Cross (Limerick) |

=== Ulster Senior Football Championship ===
Preliminary round

| 1 June 1975 Preliminary round | Fermanagh | 0–10 – 4–6 | Armagh | St. Molaise Park, Irvinestown |
| | P McGinnitty 0–4, S Reilly 0–3, F Sherry 0–2, B Keys 0–1. | | S Daly 2–5, J Christie 1–0, E O'Neill 1–0, O Carty 0–1. | Referee: M Devlin (Tyrone) |

Quarter-finals

| 1 June 1975 Quarter-final | Monaghan | 0–13 – 1–5 | Tyrone | St. Mary's Park, Castleblayney |
| | K Finlay 0–7, G Fitzpatrick 0–2, H Clerkin 0–2, E Donnelly 0–1, D Mulligan 0–1. | | E Bradley 1–0, R Beggs 0–2, J Taggart 0–1, B Donnelly 0–1, F McGuigan 0–1. | Referee: G Fagan (Armagh) |

| 8 June 1975 Quarter-final | Cavan | 0–15 – 0–13 | Donegal | MacCumhaill Park, Ballybofey |
| | S Duggan 0–7, S Leddy 0–2, H McInerney 0–2, J Carroll 0–1, D Meade 0–1, G Cusack 0–1, A King 0–1. | | M Carney 0–7, M Griffin 0–3, H McClafferty 0–1, B McEniff 0–1, S Granaghan 0–1. | Referee: T Johnston (Fermanagh) |

| 15 June 1975 Quarter-final | Down | 3–12 – 0–7 | Antrim | St. Patrick's Park, Newcastle |
| | W Walsh 1–2, P McGrath 1–1, P Rooney 1–1, D Morgan 0–4, C McAlarney 0–2, M Cunningham 0–1, D Gordon 0–1. | | A McCallin 0–3, T Doherty 0–2, D Laverty 0–1, G McCann 0–1. |

| 22 June 1975 Quarter-final | Derry | 2–15 – 1–7 | Armagh | Healy Park, Omagh |
| | J O'Leary 1–2, S O'Connell 0–4, S Mullan 0–4, P Chivers 1–0, M Lynch 0–2, B Kelly 0–2, T McGuinness 0–1. | | S Daly 1–2, J Smyth 0–2, L Kerins 0–1, P Loughran 0–1, J Kernan 0–1. | Referee: P Devlin (Tyrone) |

Semi-finals

| 29 June 1975 Semi-final | Down | 1–13 – 1–10 | Cavan | St. Mary's Park, Castleblayney |
| | M Cunningham 0–4, S O'Neill 1–0, W Walsh 0–3, D Moran 0–2, C McAlarney 0–2, J Murphy 0–1, P Rooney 0–1. | | S Duggan 0–4, D Dalton 1–0, C O'Keeffe 0–3, P McNamee 0–1, G O'Reilly 0–1, JJ Martin 0–1. | Referee: T Johnston (Fermanagh) |

| 6 July 1975 Semi-final | Monaghan | 1–11 – 1–11 | Derry | O'Neill Park, Dungannon |
| | K Finlay 0–5, G McTague 1–1, R Brady 0–2, P McEnaney 0–2, R McDonald 0–1. | | S Mullan 0–4, P Stevenson 1–0, M Lynch 0–3, N Niblock 0–2, T McGuinness 0–1, B Kelly 0–1. |

| 13 July 1975 Semi-final replay | Monaghan | 1–6 – 0–14 | Derry | O'Neill Park, Dungannon |
| | K Finlay 1–4, B Brady 0–1, JJ Gorman 0–1. | | S O'Connell 0–5, M Lynch 0–3, M Moran 0–2, J O'Leary 0–1, G McElihinney 0–1, G O'Loughlin 0–1, B Kelly 0–1. | Referee: G Fagan (Armagh) |

Final

| 27 July 1975 Final | Derry | 1–16 – 2–6 | Down | St. Tiernach's Park, Clones |
| | M Lynch 0–5, S O'Connell 0–5, G McElhinney 1–1, J O'Leary 0–2, TK McGuinness 0–2, E Laverty 0–1. | | W Walsh 2–3, P Rooney 0–2, J Murphy 0–1. | Attendance: 25,000; Referee: G Fagan (Armagh) |

=== All-Ireland Senior Football Championship ===
Semi-finals

| 10 August 1975 Semi-final | Kerry | 3–13 – 0–5 | Sligo | Croke Park, Dublin |
| | J Egan 2–2, P Spillane 1–1, P Lynch 0–4, G O'Driscoll 0–2, B Lynch 0–2, M O'Sullivan 0–1, G Power 0–1. | | M Hoey 0–3, M Kearins 0–2. | Attendance: 32,215; Referee: G Fagan (Armagh) |

| 24 August 1975 Semi-final | Dublin | 3–13 – 3–8 | Derry | Croke Park, Dublin |
| | J Keaveney 0–9, A O'Toole 2–0, T Hanahoe 1–0, D Hickey 0–2, P Gogarty 0–1, B Doyle 0–1. | | B Kelly 1–3, S O'Connell 1–3, J O'Leary 1–0, A McGuckin 0–1, G McElihinney 0–1. | Attendance: 44,455; Referee: J Moloney (Tipperary) |

Final

| 28 September 1975 Final | Kerry | 2–12 – 0–11 | Dublin | Croke Park, Dublin |
| | M Sheehy 0–4, G O'Driscoll 1–0, J Egan 1–0, P Spillane 0–3, B Lynch 0–3, D Moran 0–2. | | J Keaveney 0–6, P Gogarty 0–2, B Doyle 0–1, B Pocock 0–1, B Mullins 0–1. | Attendance: 66,346; Referee: J Moloney (Tipperary) |

== Championship statistics ==
=== Miscellaneous ===
- All championship games were reduced from eighty to seventy minutes.
- London join the Connacht championship.
- On 1 June 1975, The Cricket Field, Kilrush played host to its first championship game for 35 years as Clare play Waterford in a Munster Quarter-Final.
- Louth beat Meath for the first time since 1953.
- Kildare play Westmeath in the Leinster championship for the first time since 1960.
- Sligo won their first Connacht title since 1928 and last until 2007.
- Dublin play Kildare in the Leinster final for the first time since 1928.
- Kerry–Sligo All Ireland semi-final was the first meeting between the teams.

=== Top scorers ===
Overall

| Rank | Player | County | Tally | Total | Matches | Average |
|---|---|---|---|---|---|---|
| 1 | Jimmy Keaveney | Dublin | 1–38 | 41 | 5 | 8.20 |
| 2 | Mickey Kearns | Sligo | 1–20 | 23 | 4 | 5.75 |
| 3 | John Egan | Kerry | 5–7 | 22 | 4 | 5.50 |
| 4 | Seán O'Connell | Derry | 1–17 | 20 | 5 | 4.00 |
| 5 | Tony Hoey | Louth | 1–16 | 19 | 3 | 6.33 |
| 5 | Kieran Finlay | Monaghan | 1–16 | 19 | 3 | 6.33 |
| 5 | Tony McTague | Offaly | 0–19 | 19 | 3 | 6.33 |
| 8 | Willie Walsh | Cork | 3–8 | 17 | 3 | 5.66 |
| 9 | Seán Daly | Armagh | 3–7 | 16 | 2 | 8.00 |
| 10 | Brendan Lynch | Kerry | 0–14 | 14 | 4 | 3.50 |

Single game

| Rank | Player | County | Tally | Total | Opposition |
|---|---|---|---|---|---|
| 1 | Murt Connor | Offaly | 3–2 | 11 | Laois |
| 1 | Seán Daly | Armagh | 2–5 | 11 | Fermanagh |
| 3 | Mickey Kearns | Sligo | 0–10 | 10 | Galway |
| 3 | Jimmy Keaveney | Dublin | 0–10 | 10 | Wexford |
| 5 | John Egan | Kerry | 2–3 | 9 | Tipperary |
| 5 | Willie Walsh | Down | 2–3 | 9 | Derry |
| 5 | Tony McTague | Offaly | 0–9 | 9 | Kildare |
| 5 | Jimmy Keaveney | Dublin | 0–9 | 9 | Derry |
| 9 | Willie Brennan | Laois | 2–2 | 8 | Offaly |
| 9 | John Egan | Kerry | 2–2 | 8 | Sligo |
| 9 | Tony Hoey | Louth | 1–5 | 8 | Dublin |
| 9 | Tony Murphy | Cork | 0–8 | 8 | Clare |
