= 1977 All-Ireland Senior Football Championship =

Football championship

Championship details
- Dates: 8 May – 25 September 1977
- Teams: 33

All-Ireland Champions
- Winning team: Dublin (20th win)
- Captain: Tony Hanahoe
- Manager: Tony Hanahoe

All-Ireland Finalists
- Losing team: Armagh
- Captain: Jimmy Smyth
- Manager: Gerry O'Neill

Provincial Champions
- Munster: Kerry
- Leinster: Dublin
- Ulster: Armagh
- Connacht: Roscommon

Championship statistics
- No. matches played: 33
- Top Scorer: Jimmy Keaveney (2–27)
- Player of the Year: Jimmy Keaveney

The 1977 All-Ireland Senior Football Championship was the 91st staging of the All-Ireland Senior Football Championship, the Gaelic Athletic Association's premier inter-county Gaelic football tournament. The championship began on 8 May 1977 and ended on 25 September 1977.

Kilkenny returned to the Leinster Senior Football Championship.

Dublin entered the championship as the defending champions.

On 25 September 1977, Dublin won the championship following a 5–12 to 3–6 defeat of Armagh in the All-Ireland final. This was their 20th All-Ireland title and their second championship in succession.

Dublin's Jimmy Keaveney was the championship's top scorer with 2–27. Keaveney was also the choice for Texaco Footballer of the Year.

== Results ==
=== Connacht Senior Football Championship ===
Quarter-finals

15 May 1977 Quarter-final	Leitrim	0–6 – 0–9	London	Páirc Seán Mac Diarmada, Carrick-on-Shannon

22 May 1977 Quarter-final	Mayo	0–13 – 0–16	Roscommon	MacHale Park, Castlebar
	C Moynihan 0–6, G Feeney 0–4, T O'Malley 0–1, M Collins 0–1, S Weir 0–1.		D Earley 0–8, M Freyne 0–3, J O'Connor 0–2, P Cox 0–1, M Menton 0–1, T McManus 0–1.	Referee: J Gorman (Sligo)

Semi-finals

12 June 1977 Semi-final	Galway	5–13 – 1–9	London	Dunlo GAA Grounds, Ballinasloe
	J Tobin 2–3, G McManus 1–2, L Sammon 1–1, B Talty 0–4, B Joyce 1–0, TJ Gilmore 0–2, J Duggan 0–1.		E O'Sullivan 1–2, M McGovern 0–2, D Keating 0–2, John O'Mahoney 0–2, F Couzens 0–1, James O'Mahoney 0–1.	Referee: PJ McGrath (Mayo)

19 June 1977 Semi-final	Roscommon	2–9 – 1–6	Sligo	Dr. Hyde Park, Roscommon
	J O'Connor 1–2, E McManus 1–0, P Cox 0–2, M Freyne 0–2, A McManus 0–2, D Earley 0–1.		J Stenson 1–1, J Kearins 0–2, M Hoey 0–1, M Laffey 0–1, B Murphy 0–1.	Referee: T Moran (Leitrim)

Final

10 July 1977 Final	Roscommon	1–12 – 2–8	Galway	Dr. Hyde Park, Roscommon
	D Earley 0–9, M Freyne 1–2, T McManus 0–1.		B Talty 2–1, G McManus 0–5, TJ Gilmore 0–2.	Attendance: 18,000; Referee: T Moran (Leitrim)

=== Leinster Senior Football Championship ===
Preliminary round

8 May 1977 Preliminary round	Offaly	0–19 – 0–7	Wicklow	Croke Park, Dublin
	V Henry 0–10, G Carroll 0–2, J Dunne 0–2, E Lowry 0–2, G Hickey 0–1, P Fenning 0–1, J Mooney 0–1.		T Murphy 0–2, M Coffey 0–1, G Grehan 0–1, P O'Toole 0–1, P Quinn 0–1, F Burke 0–1.	Attendance: 1500; Referee: P Kelly (Dublin)

8 May 1977 Preliminary round	Kildare	4–13 – 2–4	Kilkenny	Geraldine Park, Athy
	T Carew 2–2, H Hyland 1–0, P Whyte 1–0, J Geoghegan 0–3, A Whelan 0–2, J Crofton 0–2, B O'Doherty 0–1, C Feeney 0–1, A Meaney 0–1, P Mangan 0–1.		K Mulhall 1–3, M Regan 1–0, G Fennelly 0–1.	Referee: J Denton (Wexford)

15 May 1977 Preliminary round	Louth	2–9 – 0–12	Westmeath	Páirc Tailteann, Navan
	D Reid 1–4, M McKeown 1–2, A McGrath 0–1, JP O'Kane 0–1, E Sheelin 0–1.		J Gillivan 0–4, T McGuire 0–2, F Scully 0–3, G McNevin 0–1, W Lowry 0–1, A O'Halloran 0–1.	Referee: R Barry (Meath)

22 May 1977 Preliminary round	Carlow	1–9 – 1–9	Longford	O'Connor Park, Tullamore
	W Cullen 1–4, P Cleere 0–2, D Byrne 0–1, T Geoghegan 0–1, J Moore 0–1.		M Greene 1–1, P Mullooly 0–3, B Smith 0–2, P Burke 0–1, S Mulvihill 0–1, J Hanniffy 0–1.	Referee: J Gunning (Offaly)

5 June 1977 Preliminary round replay	Carlow	1–10 – 1–8	Longford	O'Moore Park, Portlaoise
	W Cullen 1–3, P Clear 0–3, P Connolly 0–2, D Burke 0–2.		J Farrell 1–2, J Hanniffy 0–3, M Casey 0–2, J Bannon 0–1.	Referee: J Gunning (Offaly)

Quarter-finals

29 May 1977 Quarter-final	Dublin	1–14 – 2–8	Kildare	Páirc Tailteann, Navan
	J Keaveney 0–6, B Brogan 1–1, T Hanahoe 0–2, D Hickey 0–2, B Doyle 0–2, R Kelleher 0–1.		T Carew 1–3, P Mangan 1–0, M Condon 0–1, J Crofton 0–1, B O'Doherty 0–1, H Hyland 0–1, J Geoghegan 0–1.	Referee: P Collins (Westmeath)

5 June 1977 Quarter-final	Wexford	4–6 – 2–10	Offaly	Croke Park, Dublin
	M Quigley 2–0, G Howlin 2–0, J Shell 0–2, W French 0–1, P Neville 0–1, M Carty 0–1, B Furlong 0–1.		V Henry 1–8, J Mooney 1–1, W Bryan 0–1.	Referee: H Reilly (Louth)

12 June 1977 Quarter-final	Laois	4–15 – 1–16	Louth	Croke Park, Dublin
	W Brennan 2–4, T Prendergast 1–3, B Bohane 1–2, E Whelan 0–2, B Miller 0–2, L Scully 0–2.		D Reid 0–10, A Hoey 1–0, E Marmion 0–2, J McLoughlin 0–1, JP O'Kane 0–1, B Gaughran 0–1, T Lennon 0–1.	Referee: S Aldridge (Kildare)

19 June 1977 Quarter-final	Meath	1–18 – 0–7	Carlow	Croke Park, Dublin
	C Roe 1–4, M Kerrigan 0–5, O O'Brien 0–4, P Cromwell 0–2, C Donnegan 0–1, M Ryan 0–1, D Clare 0–1.		W Cullen 0–3, C Hughes 0–2, P Connelly 0–1, P Cleere 0–1.

Semi-finals

3 July 1977 Semi-final	Dublin	3–11 – 0–6	Wexford	Dr. Cullen Park, Carlow
	J Dunphy 0–4, W French 0–1, R Neville 0–1.		J Keaveney 0–6, J McCarthy 1–1, T Hanahoe 1–1, B Doyle 1–0, A O'Toole 0–2, R Kelleher 0–1.	Referee: S Aldridge (Kildare)

10 July 1977 Semi-final	Meath	3–20 – 1–13	Laois	Croke Park, Dublin
	K Rennicks 1–8, J Gibbons 2–0, O O'Brien 0–6, P Cromwell 0–3, G Farrelly 0–1, G McEntee 0–1, J Cassells 0–1.		W Brennan 0–6, L Scully 1–1, PJ Costello 0–1, C Browne 0–1, B Bohane 0–1, M Fennell 0–1, B Nurney 0–1, T Prendergast 0–1.

Final

31 July 1977 Final	Dublin	1–9 – 0–8	Meath	Croke Park, Dublin
	Jimmy Keaveney 0–6 (0-4f), Anton O'Toole 1–0, Bobby Doyle, John McCarthy, Fran Ryder 0–1 each		Ken Rennicks and Gerry Farrelly (0-2f) 0–2 each, Ollie O'Brien (0-1f), John Gibbons (0-1f), Cormac Rowe, Matt Kerrigan 0–1 each	Attendance: 46,044; Referee: Seamus Aldridge (Kildare)

=== Munster Senior Football Championship ===
Quarter-finals

15 May 1977 Quarter-final	Waterford	3–6 – 1–18	Clare	Fraher Field, Dungarvan
	V Kirwan 2–1, K Power 1–0, T Keating 0–2, B Fleming 0–2, T Partridge 0–1.		B McGrath 1–7, S Flanagan 1–3, A Moloney 1–3, P Curtin 0–2, M Keogh 0–1, M Downey 0–1, Martin Greene 0–1.

22 May 1977 Quarter-final	Limerick	1–5 – 4–10	Tipperary	Gaelic Grounds, Limerick
	P Kelly 1–1, G Moloney 0–2, G Brown 0–1, P Quish 0–1.		H Mulhare 2–1, G McGrath 1–4, P Morrissey 1–0, D Ryan 0–3, E Webster 0–1, T McGrath 0–1.	Referee: A Fogarty (Kerry)

Semi-finals

12 June 1977 Semi-final	Clare	1–5 – 3–12	Cork	Cusack Park, Ennis
	S Flanagan 1–0, T Curtin 0–2, M Downes 0–1, A Moloney 0–1, B O'Reilly 0–1.		D Long 0–4, D Allen 1–0, J Barry-Murphy 1–0, M Mullins 1–0, S Murphy 0–3, S Coughlan 0–3, D McCarthy 0–1, C O'Rourke 0–1.	Referee: J Landers (Waterford)

3 July 1977 Semi-final	Kerry	3–14 – 0–9	Tipperary	Austin Stack Park, Tralee
	B Walsh 2–4, P Spillane 1–0, J Egan 0–3, P Ó Sé 0–3, S Walsh 0–2, J O'Keeffe 0–1, G Power 0–1.		G McGrath 0–5, T McGrath 0–1, H Mulhare 0–1, D Ryan 0–1, S Kearney 0–1.	Referee: F Halbert (Cork)

Final

24 July 1977 Final	Kerry	3–15 – 0–9	Cork	Fitzgerald Stadium, Killarney
	Pat Spillane 1–3, Barry Walsh 0–5 (0-2f), Sean Walsh 1–1, John Egan 1–0, Mikey Sheehy 0–3 (0-2f), Jack O'Shea 0–2, Paudie Lynch 0–1		Seamus Coughlan 0-3f, Denis Long (0-1f) and Sean O'Shea 0–2 each, Dinny Allen and Jimmy Barry-Murphy 0–1 each	Attendance: 46,087; Referee: Brendan Cross (Limerick)

=== Ulster Senior Football Championship ===
Preliminary round

29 May 1977 Preliminary round	Donegal	0–12 – 1–12	Derry	MacCumhaill Park, Ballybofey
	M Carney 0–7, H McClafferty 0–2, D Doherty 0–1, S Harput 0–1, C Keeney 0–1.		S Lagan 1–5, T McGuinness 0–2, B Kelly 0–2, M Lynch 0–1, M Moran 0–1, G O'Loughlin 0–1.	Referee: L McGovern (Fermanagh)

Quarter-finals

29 May 1977 Quarter-final	Monaghan	0–10 – 0–6	Antrim	St. Mary's Park, Castleblayney
	D Mulligan 0–2, C Caddaher 0–1, K Treanor 0–1, DJ Finlay 0–1, E Hughes 0–1, B Brady 0–1, G McMeel 0–1, G Brannigan 0–1, M Quinn 0–1.		G O'Kane 0–2, G McCann 0–1, Darragh 0–1, J McKiernan 0–1, M Donaghy 0–1.	Referee: G McCabe (County Tyrone)

5 June 1977 Quarter-final	Armagh	2–14 – 1–12	Cavan	Athletic Grounds, Armagh
	C McKinstry 1–1, P Moriarty 1–0, F Toman 0–3, E O'Neill 0–3, N Marley 0–2, L Kearins 0–2, J Smyth 0–2, K Rafferty 0–1.		S Duggan 1–5, J Cusack 0–3, K O'Keeffe 0–2, O Brady 0–2.	Referee: M Devlin (County Tyrone)

12 June 1977 Quarter-final	Down	3–9 – 0–7	Fermanagh	Páirc Esler, Newry
	B Gardiner 1–1, J McParland 1–1, P Rooney 1–0, V McGovern 0–3, M Slevin 0–3, C McAlarney 0–1.		I McManus 0–4, G Lynch 0–1, V Connolly 0–1, C Corrigan 0–1.	Referee: S Murray (Monaghan)

19 June 1977 Quarter-final	Derry	3–10 – 1–11	Tyrone	The Playing Fields, Lurgan
	B Kelly 2–5, E Laverty 1–0, T McGuinness 0–2, G McElhinney 0–1, A Dallas 0–1, M Lynch 0–1.		E McKenna 0–6, B Donnelly 1–1, T Donnelly 0–2, G Taggart 0–1, K McCabe 0–1.	Referee: H Duggan (Armagh)

Semi-finals

26 June 1977 Semi-final	Armagh	2–12 – 3–5	Monaghan	O'Neill Park, Dungannon
	E O'Neill 1–1, P Trainor 1–1, P Loughran 0–3, F Tornan 0–3, J Smyth 0–2, S Daly 0–1, J Kernan 0–1.		E Tavey 1–0, G Fitzpatrick 1–1, K Treanor 1–0, K Finlay 0–1, E Hughes 0–1, R Brady 0–1, G Brannigan 0–1.	Referee: H McPolin (Antrim)

3 July 1977 Semi-final	Down	0–8 – 0–10	Derry	St. Tiernach's Park, Clones
	V McGovern 0–4, W Walsh 0–3, C McAlarney 0–1.		B Kelly 0–4, G O'Loughlin 0–3, M Lynch 0–2, T McGuinness 0–1.	Referee: P Greene (Antrim)

Final

24 July 1977 Final	Armagh	3–10 – 1–5	Derry	St. Tiernach's Park, Clones
	N Marley 1–2, P Moriarty 1–1, L Kearins 1–0, P Trainor 0–2, J Smyth 0–2, P Loughran 0–1, J Donnelly 0–1, C McKinstry 0–1.		G Keane 1–1, G McElhinney 0–1, C Faulkner 0–1, E Laverty 0–1, M Lynch 0–1.	Attendance: 25,000; Referee: S Murray (Monaghan)

=== All-Ireland Senior Football Championship ===
Semi-finals

14 August 1977 Semi-final	Armagh	3–9 – 2–12	Roscommon	Croke Park, Dublin
	J Smyth 1–4, P Moriarty 1–1, P Trainor 1–0, P Loughran 0–3, J Kernan 0–1.		D Earley 1–5, E McManus 1–1, P Cox 0–2, M Menton 0–1, J O'Gara 0–1, A McManus 0–1, M Freyne 0–1.	Attendance: 32,601; Referee: P Collins (Westmeath)

21 August 1977 Semi-final	Dublin	3–12 – 1–13	Kerry	Croke Park, Dublin
	D Hickey 1–1, J McCarthy 1–0, B Brogan 1–0, J Keaveney 0–3, A O'Toole 0–4, T Hanahoe 0–3, B Doyle 0–1.		M Sheehy 0–7, S Walsh 1–2, J Egan 0–2, J O'Keeffe 0–1, P Lynch 0–1.	Attendance: 54,974; Referee: S Murray (Monaghan)

28 August 1977 Semi-final replay	Armagh	0–15 – 0–14	Roscommon	Croke Park, Dublin
	J Smyth 0–5, P Loughran 0–5, S Devlin 0–2, P Trainor 0–2, L Kerins 0–1.		D Earley 0–7, A McManus 0–3, E McManus 0–2, P Cox 0–1, M Finneran 0–1.	Attendance: 43,322; Referee: P Collins (Westmeath)

Final

25 September 1977 Final	Dublin	5–12 – 3–6	Armagh	Croke Park, Dublin
	J Keaveney 2–6, B Doyle 2–2, J McCarthy 1–2, D Hickey 0–1, A O'Toole 0–1.		J Kernan 2–1, P Moriarty 1–0, P Loughran 0–2, J Smyth 0–1, S Devlin 0–1, P Trainor 0–1.	Attendance: 66,542; Referee: John Moloney (Tipperary)

== Championship statistics ==
=== Top scorers ===
Overall

Rank	Player	County	Tally	Total	Matches	Average
1	Jimmy Keaveney	Dublin	2–27	33	5	6.60
1	Dermot Earley	Roscommon	1–30	33	5	6.60
3	Vincent Henry	Offaly	1–18	21	2	10.50
4	Jimmy Smyth	Armagh	1–16	19	6	3.16
5	Brendan Kelly	Derry	2–11	17	4	4.25
5	Damien Reid	Louth	1–14	17	2	8.50
7	Willie Brennan	Laois	2–10	16	2	8.00
7	Willie Cullen	Carlow	2–10	16	3	5.33
9	Barry Walsh	Kerry	2–9	15	3	5.00
10	Tommy Carew	Kildare	3–5	14	2	7.00

Single game

Rank	Player	County	Tally	Total	Opposition
1	Jimmy Keaveney	Dublin	2–6	12	Armagh
2	Brendan Kelly	Derry	2–5	11	Tyrone
2	Vincent Henry	Offaly	1–8	11	Wexford
2	Ken Rennicks	Meath	1–8	11	Laois
5	Willie Brennan	Laois	2–4	10	Louth
5	Barry Walsh	Kerry	2–4	10	Tipperary
5	B. McGrath	Clare	1–7	10	Waterford
5	Vincent Henry	Offaly	0–10	10	Wicklow
5	Damien Reid	Louth	0–10	10	Laois
10	John Tobin	Galway	2–3	9	London
10	Dermot Earley	Roscommon	0–9	9	Galway

=== Miscellaneous ===
- After 2 years in the Connacht championship London record against Leitrim was their first ever championship win.
- Armagh qualify for the Ulster final for the first time since 1961. Their defeat of Derry in that game secures their first provincial title since 1953.
- The All-Ireland semi-final draw between Armagh and Roscommon was the first at that stage of the competition since 1969 when Cavan and Offaly drew.
- The attendance of 54,974 at the All-Ireland semi-final between Dublin and Kerry was the largest at an All-Ireland semi-final since 1962 when 60,396 watched the same teams in action.
- Jimmy Keaveney of Dublin set a new scoring record in an All-Ireland final when he scores 2–6 for Dublin against Armagh.
