= 1976 All-Ireland Senior Football Championship =

Football championship

Championship details
- Dates: 9 May – 26 September 1976
- Teams: 33

All-Ireland Champions
- Winning team: Dublin (19 win)
- Captain: Tony Hanahoe
- Manager: Kevin Heffernan

All-Ireland Finalists
- Losing team: Kerry
- Captain: John O'Keeffe
- Manager: Mick O'Dwyer

Provincial Champions
- Munster: Kerry
- Leinster: Dublin
- Ulster: Derry
- Connacht: Galway

Championship statistics
- No. matches played: 36
- Top Scorer: Mikey Sheehy (4–26)
- Player of the Year: Jimmy Keaveney

The 1976 All-Ireland Senior Football Championship was the 90th staging of the All-Ireland Senior Football Championship, the Gaelic Athletic Association's premier inter-county Gaelic football tournament. The championship began on 9 May 1976 and ended on 26 September 1976.

Kerry were the defending champions.

On 26 September 1976, Dublin won the championship following a 3–8 to 0–10 defeat of Kerry in the All-Ireland final. This was their 19th All-Ireland title, their first in two championship seasons.

Dublin's Jimmy Keaveney was the choice for Texaco Footballer of the Year.

== Results ==
=== Connacht Senior Football Championship ===
Quarter-finals

| 23 May 1976 Quarter-final | Mayo | 0–11 – 0–11 | Leitrim | Fr. O'Hara Park, Charlestown |
| | R Bell (0–2), JP Kean (0–2), S Kilbride (0–3); G Farragher (0–2) & W Fitzpatrick (0–2). |

| 30 May 1976 Quarter-final replay | Leitrim | 2–8 – 0–10 | Mayo | Páirc Seán Mac Diarmada, Carrick-on-Shannon |
| | E McHale 1–0, N Mahon 1–0, J Houlihan 0–2, T Dolan 0–2, M Martin 0–1, S Flanagan 0–1, F Bohan 0–1, T Mulvey 0–1. | | JP Kean 0–4, S Kilbride 0–1, M Sweeney 0–1, G Farragher 0–1, M Dixon 0–1, P Corrigan 0–1, R Bell 0–1. | Referee: J Lee (Sligo) |

| 30 May 1976 Quarter-final | Roscommon | 2–18 – 1–7 | London | Dr. Hyde Park, Roscommon |
| | M Freyne 0–7, J O'Connor 1–3, H Griffin 1–0, T Donnellan 0–3, J Finnegan 0–2, P Cox 0–1, D Watson 0–1, E McManus 0–1. | | K Maguire 1–0, D Keating 0–4, J Mahoney 0–1, G Nellis 0–1, J Coffey 0–1. | Referee: J O'Gorman (Sligo) |

Semi-finals

| 6 June 1976 Semi-final | Leitrim | 0–8 – 3–21 | Galway | Páirc Seán Mac Diarmada, Carrick-on-Shannon |
| | M Martin 0–5, S Flanagan 0–1, T Dolan 0–1, E McHale 0–1. | | J McLoughlin 1–8, J Duggan 1–2, J Barrett 1–1, B Talty 0–3, L Sammon 0–3, T Naughton 0–2, W Joyce 0–1, D Smyth 0–1. | Referee: PJ McGrath (Mayo) |

| 13 June 1976 Semi-final | Sligo | 0–7 – 2–10 | Roscommon | Markievicz Park, Sligo |
| | M Kearins 0–6, J Stenson 0–1. | | J O'Connor 0–4, J Kelly 1–0, P Cox 0–2, N Freyne 0–1, G Beirne 0–1, J Finnegan 0–1, J O'Gara 0–1. | Referee: M Loftus (Mayo) |

Finals

| 4 July 1976 Final | Roscommon | 1–8 – 1–8 | Galway | MacHale Park, Castlebar |
| | J O'Gara 1–1, J O'Connor 0–2, T Donnellan 0–1, P Cox 0–1, J Kelly 0–1, E McManus 0–1, M Freyne 0–1. | | J Duggan 1–1, D Smith 0–2, J McLoughlin 0–2, J Tobin 0–1, B Talty 0–1, S McHugh 0–1. | Attendance: 18,000; Referee: M Loftus (Mayo) |

| 18 July 1976 Final replay | Galway | 1–14 – 0–9 | Roscommon | Tuam Stadium, Tuam |
| | J McLoughlin 0–6, J Duggan 1–0, K Clancy 0–2, J Tobin 0–2, T Naughton 0–2, L O'Neill 0–1, J Hughes 0–1. | | J O'Connor 0–4, J O'Gara 0–1, T Donnellan 0–1, M McNamara 0–1, M Freyne 0–1, G Beirne 0–1. | Attendance: 16,000; Referee: M Loftus (Mayo) |

=== Leinster Senior Football Championship ===
First round

| 9 May 1976 First round | Meath | 2–13 – 1–10 | Wicklow | Croke Park, Dublin |
| | G Farrelly 1–5, C Rowe 1–1, C O'Rourke 0–4, K Rennicks 0–2, M Ryan 0–1. | | M O'Toole 0–6, E Dunne 1–0, P Kavanagh 0–1, T Foley 0–1, G Farrell 0–1, T Murphy 0–1. | Referee: P Kelly (Dublin) |

| 9 May 1976 First round | Wexford | 2–11 – 0–14 | Westmeath | Geraldine Park, Athy |
| | M Quigley 1–3, E Waters 1–2, M Carty 0–2, D Clancy 0–2, G Howling 0–1, J Dunphy 0–1. | | D Smith 0–7, J Keane 0–3, W Lowry 0–2, M Scally 0–1, P Halligan 0–1. | Referee: S Aldridge (Kildare) |

| 23 May 1976 First round | Laois | 2–12 – 0–8 | Carlow | Geraldine Park, Athy |

| 30 May 1976 First round | Longford | 3–21 – 0–5 | Kilkenny | O'Connor Park, Tullamore |

Quarter-finals

| 6 June 1976 Quarter-final | Offaly | 0–8 – 3–8 | Meath | Croke Park, Dublin |
| | L Hanlon 0–3, S Lowry 0–2, P Fenning 0–1, W Bryan 0–1, M Wright 0–1. | | G Farrelly 1–4, C O'Rourke 1–0, M Kerrigan 1–0, C Rowe 0–2, K Rennicks 0–1, J Gibbons 0–1. | Referee: P Kelly (Dublin) |

| 20 June 1976 Quarter-final | Wexford | 0–15 – 1–8 | Louth | Croke Park, Dublin |
| | E Waters 0–7, M Carthy 0–2, B Rowesome 0–2, M Miller 0–1, G Howlin 0–1, W French 0–1, M Quigley 0–1. | | A Hoey 1–1, P McPartland 0–2, G Nixon 0–1, F Brennan 0–1, D McCoy 0–1, D Reid 0–1, B Gaughran 0–1. | Referee: P Kelly (Dublin) |

| 20 June 1976 Quarter-final | Laois | 1–13 – 0–12 | Kildare | Dr. Cullen Park, Carlow |
| | W Brennan 1–6, T McCague 0–3, P Brophy 0–2, M Fennell 0–1, S Allen 0–1. | | T Shaw 0–6, P Dunny 0–3, P Swords 0–1, B O'Doherty 0–1, T Carew 0–1. | Attendance: M Meally (Kilkenny) |

| 27 June 1976 Quarter-final | Dublin | 5–16 – 0–7 | Longford | Cusack Park, Mullingar |
| | J Keaveney 3–4, P Gogarty 1–3, A O'Toole 1–1, K Moran 0–3, D Hickey 0–3, B Mullins 0–1, B Doyle 0–1. | | L Tierney 0–3, J Hanniffy 0–2, P Mullooly 0–1, T McCormick 0–1. | Attendance: 15,000; Referee: P Collins (Westmeath) |

Semi-finals

| 4 July 1976 Semi-final | Wexford | 1–9 – 2–14 | Meath | Croke Park, Dublin |
| | G Howlin 1–1, D Clancy 0–3, M Miller 0–2, M Carthy 0–1, W French 0–1, M Quigley 0–1. | | M Kerrigan 0–5, G Farrelly 1–1, C O'Rourke 0–4, PJ O'Halloran 1–0, C Rowe 0–2, K Rennicks 0–1, J Gibbons 0–1. | Referee: S Aldridge (Kildare) |

| 11 July 1976 Semi-Final | Dublin | 3–12 – 0–11 | Laois | O'Connor Park, Tullamore |
| | J Keaveney 1–3, P Gogarty 1–2, B Mullins 1–2, A O'Toole 0–2, B Doyle 0–2. | | W Brennan 0–5, T Prendergast 0–3, M Fennell 0–2, T McCague 0–1. | Referee: H O'Reilly (Louth) |

Final

| 25 July 1976 Final | Dublin | 2–8 – 1–9 | Meath | Croke Park, Dublin |
| | Jimmy Keaveny 0–4 (0-1f, 1 '50), Anton O'Toole and Tony Hanahoe 1–0 each, David Hickey 0–2, Bobby Doyle and Paddy Gogarty 0–1 each | | Colm O'Rourke 1–2 (0-1f), Gerry Farrelly 0-2f, John Gibbons (0-1f), Mick Ryan, Cormac Rowe, Mattie Kerrigan, Ollie O'Brien (0-1f) 0–1 each | Attendance: 38,955; Referee: S Aldridge (Kildare) |

=== Munster Senior Football Championship ===
Quarter-finals

| 9 May 1976 Quarter-final | Waterford | 5–11 – 1–11 | Tipperary | Fraher Field, Dungarvan |
| | J Galvin 0–6, V Kirwan 1–1, M Power 1–1, R Ahearn 1–0, S Ahern 1–0, T Moore 1–0, J Hennessy 0–2, B Fleming 0–1. | | H Mulhaire 1–4, C O'Flaherty 0–4, G McGrath 0–1, J Cummins 0–1, J Williams 0–1. | Referee: F Halbert (Cork) |

| 16 May 1976 Quarter-final | Limerick | 2–4 – 1–6 | Clare | Gaelic Grounds, Limerick |
| | M Greene 1–1, S Clanagan 1–0, C Buckley 0–1, J McMahon 0–1, M Downes 0–1. | | G Browne 1–2, T Kennedy 0–2, S Holmes 0–1, J Ryan 0–1. | Referee: B O'Grady (Kerry) |

Semi-finals

| 20 June 1976 Semi-final | Waterford | 0–6 – 3–17 | Kerry | Fraher Field, Dungarvan |
| | J Hennessy 0–2, E Halloran 0–1, J Galvin 0–1, R Dunford 0–1, D Conway 0–1. | | P Spillane 1–5, M Sheehy 1–4, B Lynch 1–2, D Moran 0–2, M O'Sullivan 0–2, J Egan 0–2. | Referee: G Ryan (Tipperary) |

| 20 June 1976 Semi-final | Cork | 2–15 – 1–10 | Clare | Semple Stadium, Thurles |
| | S Coughlan 1–3, S O'Shea 1–0, B Fields 0–3, J Barry-Murphy 0–3, D Long 0–3, S Murphy 0–2, D McCarthy 0–1. | | J McMahon 0–6, S Flanagan 1–0, C Buckley 0–1, Martin Greene 0–1, S Moloney 0–1, | Referee: J Moloney (Tipperary) |

Finals

| 11 July 1976 Final | Cork | 0–10 – 0–10 | Kerry | Páirc Uí Chaoimh, Cork |
| | Denis Long (0-2f), Billy Field (0-2f), Dinny Allen 0–2 each, Seamus Coughlan, Jimmy Barry-Murphy, Declan Barron, Sean Murphy (0-1f) 0–1 each | | Mikey Sheehy 0–5 (0-3f), Pat McCarthy and Pat Spillane 0–2, Sean Walsh 0–1 | Attendance: 40,600; Referee: John Moloney (Tipperary) |

| 25 July 1976 Final replay | Cork | 2–19 – 3–20 (a.e.t.) | Kerry | Páirc Uí Chaoimh, Cork |
| | Jimmy Barry-Murphy 1–3, Sean Murphy 0–5 (0-1f), Colman O'Rourke 0–4 (0-1f), Seamus Coughlan 1–0, Declan Barron 0–3, Denis Long, Dave McCarthy, Dinny Allen, Billy Field 0–1 each | | Mikey Sheehy 0–11 (0-5f), Pat Spillane and Sean Walsh 1–3 each, Mickey O'Sullivan 1–2, John Egan 0–1 | Attendance: 45,235; Referee: John Moloney (Tipperary) |

=== Ulster Senior Football Championship ===
Preliminary round

| 23 May 1976 Preliminary round | Armagh | 1–13 – 1–12 | Fermanagh | Athletic Grounds, Armagh |

Quarter-finals

| 30 May 1976 Quarter-final | Cavan | 1–9 – 0–8 | Donegal | Breffni Park, Cavan |
| | C O'Keeffe 1–1, O Brady 0–3, S Duggan 0–2, N Smith 0–1, D Meade 0–1, G Cusack 0–1. | | S Granaghan 0–3, M Lafferty 0–2, M Carney 0–2, H McClafferty 0–1. | Referee: T Johnston (Fermanagh) |

| 6 June 1976 Quarter-final | Antrim | 2–6 – 0–14 | Down | Casement Park, Belfast |
| | G McCann 1–0, A McCallion 0–2, JP O'Kane 0–1, P Armstrong 0–1, S McGourty 0–1, A Hamill 0–1. | | W Walsh 0–5, P Rooney 0–3, B Fitzsimons 0–2, B Bardner 0–2, V McGovern 0–1, D Rodgers 0–1. | Referee: G Fagan (Antrim) |

| 6 June 1976 Quarter-final | Tyrone | 2–10 – 1–10 | Monaghan | O'Neill Park, Dungannon |

| 13 June 1976 Quarter-final | Derry | 1–19 – 2–1 | Armagh | Healy Park, Omagh |
| | B Kelly 0–7, A McGuckin 1–2, T McGuinness 0–2, G McElhinney 0–2, J O'Leary 0–2, M Lynch 0–1, P Stevenson 0–1, G O'Loughlin 0–1, A McGurk 0–1. | | D McCoy 2–0, P Loughran 0–1. | Referee: P Devlin (Tyrone) |

Semi-finals

| 20 June 1976 Semi-final | Down | 0–10 – 1–18 | Cavan | St. Mary's Park, Castleblayney |
| | D Rodgers 0–3, W Walsh 0–3, P Rooney 0–1, B Fitzsimons 0–1, L Austin 0–1, C McAlarney 0–1. | | S Duggan 0–10, O Martin 1–1, G Cusack 0–3, N Smith 0–2, O Leddy 0–1, C O'Dea 0–1. |

| 27 June 1976 Semi-final | Tyrone | 0–8 – 0–12 | Derry | St. Tiernach's Park, Clones |
| | P McGuigan 0–2, B O'Neill 0–2, G Taggart 0–1, M Hughes 0–1, E Devlin 0–1, E McKenna 0–1. | | B Kelly 0–6, M Lynch 0–2, A McGuckin 0–1, J O'Leary 0–1, M Moran 0–1, T McGuinness 0–1. | Referee: H McPoland (Antrim) |

Finals

| 18 July 1976 Final | Derry | 1–8 – 1–8 | Cavan | St. Tiernach's Park, Clones |
| | B Kelly 0–4, J O'Leary 1–0, M Lynch 0–2, M Moran 0–1, T McGuinness 0–1. | | S Duggan 1–3, A King 0–1, O Brady 0–1, E Martin 0–1, G Cusack 0–1, C O'Keeffe 0–1. | Attendance: 20,000; Referee: G Fagan (Armagh) |

| 25 July 1976 Final replay | Derry | 0–22 – 1–16 (a.e.t.) | Cavan | St. Tiernach's Park, Clones |
| | B Kelly 0–8, M Lynch 0–4, F McCloskey 0–3, G McElhinney 0–2, A McGurk 0–1, J O'Leary 0–1, M Moran 0–1, T McGuinness 0–1. | | S Duggan 0–7, J Dwyer 1–3, O Brady 0–2, E Martin 0–2, E Cusack 0–1, O Leddy 0–1. | Attendance: 25,000; Referee: G Fagan (Armagh) |

=== All-Ireland Senior Football Championship ===
Semi-finals

| 8 August 1976 Semi-final | Kerry | 5–14 – 1–10 | Derry | Croke Park, Dublin |
| | M Sheehy 3–3, S Walsh 1–1, G O'Driscoll 1–0, B Lynch 0–3, J Egan 0–2, P Spillane 0–2, T Kennelly 0–1, M O'Sullivan 0–1, D Moran 0–1. | | B Kelly 0–4, P Stevenson 1–0, M Lynch 0–2, F McCloskey 0–1, L Diamond 0–1, J O'Leary 0–1, T McGuinness 0–1. | Attendance: 30,963; Referee: P Collins (Westmeath) |

| 29 August 1976 Semi-final | Dublin | 1–8 – 0–8 | Galway | Croke Park, Dublin |
| | J Keaveney 1–5, T Hanahoe 0–2, J McCarthy 0–1. | | J Hughes 0–2, W Joyce 0–2, J Tobin 0–2, L Sammon 0–1, B Talty 0–1. | Referee: F Halbert (Cork) |

Final

| 26 September 1976 Final | Dublin | 3–8 – 0–10 | Kerry | Croke Park, Dublin |
| | J Keaveney 1–2, J McCarthy 1–1, B Mullins 1–1, B Brogan 0–1, A O'Toole 0–1, T Hanahoe 0–1, D Hickey 0–1. | | M Sheehy 0–3, P Spillane 0–2, D Moran 0–2, M O'Sullivan 0–1, B Lynch 0–1, J Egan 0–1. | Attendance: 73,588; Referee: P Collins (Westmeath) |

== Championship statistics ==
=== Miscellaneous ===
- Leitrim recorded their first win over Mayo since 1959 after a replay.
- Cork Athletic Grounds changed its name to Pairc Ui Chaoimh after Pádraig Ó Caoimh.
- 3 Provincial finals end in a draw and to a replay in the same year for the first time since 1924 (CLU) and never since (as of 2019) Connacht, Munster and Ulster. 1888, 1903 & 1915 were the only other years up to 1976 to have had multiple provincial final draws.
- The All-Ireland final was Dublin's first win over Kerry since the All-Ireland semi-final of 1934.

=== Top scorers ===
Overall

| Rank | Player | County | Tally | Total | Matches | Average |
|---|---|---|---|---|---|---|
| 1 | Mikey Sheehy | Kerry | 4–26 | 38 | 5 | 7.60 |
| 2 | Jimmy Keaveney | Dublin | 6–18 | 36 | 5 | 7.20 |
| 3 | Brendan Kelly | Derry | 0–29 | 29 | 5 | 5.80 |
| 4 | Steve Duggan | Cavan | 1–22 | 25 | 4 | 6.25 |
| 5 | Gerry Farrelly | Meath | 3–12 | 21 | 4 | 5.25 |
| 6 | Pat Spillane | Kerry | 2–14 | 20 | 5 | 4.00 |
| 7 | Joe McLoughlin | Galway | 1–16 | 19 | 4 | 4.75 |

Single game

| Rank | Player | County | Tally | Total | Opposition |
|---|---|---|---|---|---|
| 1 | Jimmy Keaveney | Dublin | 3–4 | 13 | Longford |
| 2 | Mikey Sheehy | Kerry | 3–3 | 12 | Derry |
| 3 | Joe McLoughlin | Galway | 1–8 | 11 | Leitrim |
| 3 | Mikey Sheehy | Kerry | 0–11 | 11 | Cork |
| 5 | Steve Duggan | Cavan | 0–10 | 10 | Down |
| 6 | Willie Brennan | Laois | 1–6 | 9 | Kildare |
| 7 | Gerry Farrelly | Meath | 1–5 | 8 | Wicklow |
| 7 | Pat Spillane | Kerry | 1–5 | 8 | Waterford |
| 7 | Jimmy Keaveney | Dublin | 1–5 | 8 | Galway |
| 7 | Brendan Kelly | Derry | 0–8 | 8 | Cavan |
