= Tony Hanahoe =

Dublin Gaelic footballer and hurler

Personal information
- Native name: Antóin Ó hEanchaí (Irish)
- Born: 29 April 1945 (age 81) Clontarf, Dublin, Ireland
- Occupation: Solicitor
- Height: 6 ft 0 in (183 cm)

Sport
- Sport: Gaelic football
- Position: Centre-forward
Club
- Years: Club
- 1964–1984: St Vincent's
Club titles
- Dublin titles: 11
- Leinster titles: 3
- All-Ireland Titles: 1
Inter-county
- Years: County
- 1964–1979: Dublin
Inter-county titles
- Leinster titles: 6
- All-Irelands: 3
- NFL: 2
- All Stars: 1

Anthony Hanahoe (born 29 April 1945) is an Irish former Gaelic footballer, hurler and Gaelic football manager. His league and championship career at senior level with the Dublin county team spanned sixteen seasons from 1964 to 1979.

Born in Clontarf, Hanahoe excelled at both Gaelic football and hurling in his youth. He was educated at St. Joseph's Secondary School Fairview, where he first developed his skills in both codes. Hanahoe joined the St Vincent's club and, after progressing through the juvenile and underage grades, was a regular member of the starting fifteen by 1964. He won the first of eleven county senior championship medals that year. The highlight of his club career came in 1976 when he won an All-Ireland medal. Hanahoe also won three Leinster club medals before retiring after a two-decade-long career.

Hanahoe made his debut on the inter-county scene when he lined out for Dublin as a dual player in the respective minor grades. After little success, he made his senior debut in a challenge game in 1964. Over the course of the next fifteen years, Hanahoe won three All-Ireland medals, beginning with a lone triumph in 1974, followed by back-to-back triumphs as captain in 1976 and 1977. He also won six Leinster medals, two National Football League medals and one All Star. He played his last game for Dublin in September 1979.

Hanahone was in the twilight of his career when he was picked for the Leinster interprovincial team. He ended his career without a Railway Cup medal.

Even during his playing days Hanahoe became involved in team management. He succeeded Kevin Heffernan as player-manager of Dublin in 1977 and guided the team to a second successive All-Ireland title.

== Biography ==
Hanahoe was born in Clontarf, Dublin in 1945. He was educated locally by the Christian Brothers at Scoil Mhuire in Marino and later at St. Joseph's Fairview, affectionately known as ‘Joey’s’, in Fairview. There was no sporting tradition in Hanahoe's family, however, it was at these schools that his interest at Gaelic games was developed. Hanahoe later attended Trinity College, Dublin where he qualified with a degree in law. He subsequently worked as a solicitor and has worked with victims of the Stardust disaster

== Football career ==
=== Club ===
Hanahoe played his club hurling and club football with the famous St. Vincent's club in Dublin. With the club he won eleven Dublin SFC titles in 1964, 1966, 1967, 1970, 1971, 1972, 1975, 1976, 1977, 1981 and 1984. One of these wins was converted into an All-Ireland title in 1976. Hanahoe also won Dublin SHC titles with the club in 1964, 1967 and 1975.

=== Inter-county ===
Hanahoe played both minor hurling and football with Dublin in the early 1960s. He played in the Leinster minor final of 1963, however, his side were defeated by Westmeath. Later that same year Hanahoe got trials with the senior team in both sports. He subsequently secured a spot on Dublin's senior football team and made his debut in 1964. In 1965 Hanahoe the left the Dublin team and put his sporting career on hold. He returned in 1970 when Kevin Heffernan was manager of the side. By this stage Dublin's football fortunes were at an all-time low. This low ebb culminated in a defeat by Kildare in the 1972 Leinster semi-final. Hanahoe was captain that day and it was feared at the time that all the players would be sacked along with the management team.

Hanahoe played no part in the 1973 championship but he returned in 1974 and Kevin Heffernan was appointed manager once again. That year Hanahoe claimed his first Leinster title before later going on to beat Galway to claim his first All-Ireland medal. In 1975 Dublin retained their provincial title with Hanahoe playing a key role in the half-forward line. His side, however, were later defeated by an up-and-coming Kerry side. In 1976 Hanahoe was appointed captain of Dublin. Under his leadership Dublin captured another Leinster title before gaining revenge over Kerry for the previous year's defeat. It was Dublin's nineteenth All-Ireland title and it was Hanahoe's second. Hanahoe also became one of only seven men to have been presented the Sam Maguire Cup twice as captain. His performance in the championship earned him his sole All-Star award.

Following the conclusion of the 1976 championship, Kevin Heffernan unexpectedly stepped down as Dublin manager. Hanahoe was somewhat pushed into accepting the vacant position. He now had the unenviable task of being captain of the side as well as the manager. In spite of this pressure, he captured another Leinster title in 1977. He later led Dublin to victory against Kerry before later claiming his third All-Ireland medal following an emphatic victory over Armagh.

In 1978 Hanahoe retained his dual role as captain and manager. He captured his fifth Leinster title in-a-row before leading Dublin into their fifth All-Ireland final in-a-row. Dublin were the red hot favourites to complete the three-in-a-row, however, Kerry were back on form. The game itself is remembered for Mikey Sheehy’s cheeky goal which he scored by lobbing the ball over the head of Paddy Cullen. It was an emphatic victory for Kerry on a score line of 5–11 to 0–9. In 1979 Heffernan returned as manager, however, Hanahoe retained the captaincy of the team. He captured his sixth Leinster title which allowed Dublin to advance to their sixth All-Ireland final appearance in-a-row. Once again Hanahoe's side faced Kerry. Dublin were outplayed in the final once again and Hanahoe ended up on the losing side. This defeat brought an end to the great Dublin team of the 1970s. Hanahoe retired from inter-county football shortly after.

Sporting positions
Preceded by Seán Doherty	Dublin Senior Football Captain; 1976–1979	Succeeded by Tommy Drumm
Preceded by Kevin Heffernan	Dublin Senior Football Manager; 1976–1978	Succeeded by Kevin Heffernan
Achievements
Preceded by Mickey O'Sullivan	All-Ireland SFC winning captain 1976–1977	Succeeded by Denis 'Ogie' Moran
Preceded by Kevin Heffernan	All-Ireland SFC winning manager 1977	Succeeded by Mick O'Dwyer
