= 1981 All-Ireland Senior Football Championship final =

- Event: 1981 All-Ireland Senior Football Championship
Kerry	Offaly
1–12 (15)	0–8 (8)
- Date: 20 September 1981
- Venue: Croke Park, Dublin
- Referee: Paddy Collins (Westmeath)
- Attendance: 61,489

The 1981 All-Ireland Senior Football Championship final was the 94th All-Ireland Final and the deciding match of the 1981 All-Ireland Senior Football Championship, an inter-county Gaelic football tournament for the top teams in Ireland.

This was one of the 13 consecutive All-Ireland SFC finals contested by either Dublin or Kerry between 1974 and 1986, a period when one of either team always contested the decider.

== Match ==
=== Summary ===
Kerry completed a four-in-a-row with a brilliant Jack O'Shea goal.

It was the second of five All-Ireland SFC titles won by Kerry in the 1980s.

=== Details ===
20 September 1981; Final	Kerry	1–12 – 0–8	Offaly	Croke Park, Dublin; Attendance: 61,489; Referee: Paddy Collins (Westmeath)
20 September 1981; Final	M Sheehy 0–5, J O'Shea 1–0, D Moran 0–2, T Doyle 0–1, J Egan 0–1, P Ó Sé 0–1, S Walsh 0–1, G Power 0–1		M Connor 0–4, S Lowry 0–2, T O'Connor 0–1, B Lowry 0–1	Croke Park, Dublin; Attendance: 61,489; Referee: Paddy Collins (Westmeath)

Kerry	Offaly

==== Kerry ====
- 1 C. Nelligan
- 2 J. Deenihan (c)
- 3 J. O'Keeffe
- 4 P. Lynch
- 5 P. Ó Sé
- 6 T. Kennelly
- 7 M. Spillane
- 8 S. Walsh
- 9 J. O'Shea
- 10 G. Power
- 11 D. Moran
- 12 T. Doyle
- 13 M. Sheehy
- 14 E. Liston
- 15 J. Egan

Subs used
P. Spillane for J. Egan
G. O'Keeffe for M. Spillane

Subs not used
18 T. Spillane
19 P. Sheahan
20 B. O'Sullivan
21 P. O'Mahony

Manager
M. O'Dwyer

==== Offaly ====
- 1 M. Furlong
- 2 M. Fitzgerald
- 3 L. O'Connor
- 4 C. Conroy
- 5 P. Fitzgerald
- 6 R. Connor (c)
- 7 L. Currams
- 8 T. O'Connor
- 9 P. Dunne
- 10 V. Henry
- 11 G. Carroll
- 12 A. O'Halloran
- 13 M. Connor
- 14 S. Lowry
- 15 B. Lowry

Subs used
24 J. Mooney for T. Connor
21 J. Moran for V. Henry

Subs not used
16 D. Wynne
17 O. Minnock
18 S. Darby
19 M. Wright
20 T. Fitzpatrick
22 J. Guinan
23 M. Lowry

Manager
E. McGee
