= 1982 All-Ireland Senior Football Championship final =

- Event: 1982 All-Ireland Senior Football Championship
Offaly	Kerry
1–15 (18)	0–17 (17)
- Date: 19 September 1982
- Venue: Croke Park, Dublin
- Referee: P. J. McGrath (Mayo; Kilmaine)
- Attendance: 62,309
- Weather: Rain

The 1982 All-Ireland Senior Football Championship final was the 95th All-Ireland Final and the deciding match of the 1982 All-Ireland Senior Football Championship, an inter-county Gaelic football tournament for the top teams in Ireland. The game, played at Croke Park in Dublin, culminated in one of the most famous goals of all time.

Kerry entered the match as heavy favourite to complete an unprecedented five consecutive All-Ireland SFC titles, having won the previous four titles in a run that stretched back to 1978. Kerry's opponent Offaly had not won an All-Ireland SFC title since 1972.

Kerry and Offaly had met in the 1980 semi-final and the 1981 final, Kerry emerging as victors on both occasions. Indeed, Kerry had not lost a championship game since the 1977 semi-final. However, this time, a last-minute Séamus Darby goal — struck past the hapless Charlie Nelligan — deprived Kerry of their five-in-a-row dream. This was one of the 13 consecutive All-Ireland SFC finals contested by either Dublin or Kerry between 1974 and 1986, a period when one of either team always contested the decider, and the only one of those 13 won by another team. As a result, Kerry had to put away their "Five in a Row" song, which had been prepared especially for the occasion.

== Match ==
The 1982 Offaly team had five sets of brothers: the Lowrys (Mick, Seán and Brendan), the Fitzgeralds (Mick and Pat), the Darbys (Séamus and Stephen) and two sets of Connors brothers (Liam and Thomas, Matt and Richie).

This year's final was played on 19 September.

Kerry had a one-point lead in the second half when referee P. J. McGrath awarded a penalty against Offaly. Mikey Sheehy stepped up to take the spot kick. He was facing the Canal End of Croke Park. Sheehy had been having a poor game, unable to detach himself from the attention of Mick Fitzgerald. Offaly goalkeeper Martin Furlong, playing his 56th championship match for his county, yelled at the Offaly backs to pay heed to a possible rebound. Furlong met Sheehy's strike, a ball hit about four feet high, with the palm of his hand. Pat Fitzgerald collected the rebound. Offaly were away, and Johnny Mooney scored a point to bring the teams level.

Soon, though, Kerry acquired a four-point lead. Offaly kept with Kerry, however. Eugene McGee and his selectors opted to send Séamus Darby onto the field of play as a substitute, with instructions to stay forward and try for a goal. Darby arrived onto the field as a replacement for John Guinan with seven minutes left to play. Kerry were winning by two points with two minutes to go. Eoin Liston conceded a free after knocking over Pat Fitzgerald in the middle of the field. Darby got behind his marker Tommy Doyle and caught a "high, lobbing, dropping ball". He struck the ball with his left foot past the hapless Charlie Nelligan into the goalkeeper's top left corner, scoring one of the most famous goals of all time. It was his only kick of the match.

The referee played 45 seconds of additional time. Tom Spillane ran along the Hogan Stand side of Croke Park only to lose the ball to Seán Lowry. Furlong ran to gather the ball and sent a handpass in the direction of Brendan Lowry. Sheehy got the ball instead, sending it across Furlong's goal. Seán Lowry, beneath it, awaited its descent. He later said: "I remember thinking if I catch it over my head and the Bomber [Liston] comes in and drives it into the back of the net, it's all for nothing. Imagine all these things came into my head. I was catching it in my chest and just then, when it was still a good bit up, 'You're on your own Jack', someone behind me shouted. Paudie Lynch was nearby. Never came. Never jumped. Eoin Liston could have got there no problem. They were just shell shocked". Seán Lowry caught the ball. The referee blew the final whistle, with Lowry still in possession. Offaly had won by a single point on a scoreline of 1–15 to 0–17.

=== Details ===
19 September 1982

Offaly	1–15 – 0–17	Kerry
Matt Connor 0–7, Séamus Darby 1–0, Brendan Lowry 0–3, Johnny Mooney 0–2, Pat Fitzgerald 0–1, Seán Lowry 0–1, Liam Currams 0–1	Report	Tom Spillane 0–3, Mikey Sheehy 0–3, John Egan 0–3, Eoin Liston 0–2, Páidí Ó Sé 0–2, Seán Walsh 0–2, Pat Spillane 0–1, Jack O'Shea 0–1

Croke Park, Dublin
Attendance: 62,309
Referee: P. J. McGrath (Mayo)

Offaly	Kerry

1	Martin Furlong
2	Mick Lowry	Substituted off
3	Liam O'Connor
4	Mick Fitzgeald
5	Pat Fitzgerald
6	Seán Lowry
7	Liam Currams
8	Tomás O'Connor
9	Pádraig Dunne
10	John Guinan	Substituted off
11	Richie Connor (c)
12	Gerry Carroll
13	Johnny Mooney
14	Matt Connor
15	Brendan Lowry
Substitutes:
16	Dinny Wynne
17	Charlie Conroy
18	Stephen Darby	Substituted on
19	Liam O'Mahony
20	Séamus Darby	Substituted on
21	Martin Fitzpatrick
Manager:
Eugene McGee

1	Charlie Nelligan
2	Ger O'Keeffe
3	John O'Keeffe
4	Paudie Lynch
5	Páidí Ó Sé
6	Tim Kennelly
7	Tommy Doyle
8	Jack O'Shea
9	Seán Walsh
10	Ger Power
11	Tom Spillane
12	Denis Moran	Substituted off
13	Mikey Sheehy
14	Eoin Liston
15	John Egan (c)
Substitutes:
16	Ger Lynch
17	Vincent O'Connor
18	Mick Spillane
19	John L. McElligott
20	Pat Spillane	Substituted on
21	Paudie O'Mahony
Manager:
Mick O'Dwyer

== Post-match ==
The five-in-a-row was not achieved.

Martin Furlong was named Footballer of the Year.

Martin Breheny interviewed the players from both teams in their dressing rooms. Journalists were permitted to do so at the time, though the practice would later cease. Breheny later recalled sitting next to Jack O'Shea as he tried to make sense of what had just occurred on the field.

Pat Spillane locked himself into a toilet and wept.

This remains the last occasion on which Offaly won an All-Ireland Senior Football Championship.

Kerry reached the 1983 Munster Senior Football Championship final, where opponents Cork denied them victory with another late goal, meaning Kerry did not even make that year's All-Ireland semi-final. This appeared to signal the end for this Kerry team.

In 2005, RTÉ named Darby's goal as one of the Top 20 GAA Moments.

The expression "to do a Séamus Darby" has been used in other fields.

The match received renewed attention in 2010 when the Kilkenny hurlers were aiming to complete their own five-in-a-row, also never realised.

In 2018, Martin Breheny listed this as the greatest All-Ireland Senior Football Championship Final.

Radio Kerry played the Five in a Row song in 2018 when the minor team did what the 1982 side could not.

Loosehorse produced a documentary, Players of the Faithful, which debuted on RTÉ on 28 December 2018.

An episode of Laochra Gael focusing on Darby and titled "An Fear a Scóráil an Cúl" ("The Man Who Got the Goal") first aired on TG4 in 2019.

Offaly released a 1982 replica jersey in 2019.

The match again received great attention in 2019 as Dublin prepared for their own attempt at a five-in-a-row, having — in 2018 — become the first team since Kerry in 1981 to win four consecutive titles. By coincidence, the golfer Shane Lowry — son of Brendan and nephew of Seán and Mick — won the 2019 Open Championship during that Championship season, doing so as the Munster and Ulster champions, Kerry and Donegal, played out an entertaining draw in Croke Park, a day after Dublin hammered Connacht champions Roscommon at the same venue.

After Dublin's successful five-in-a-row, Séamus Darby declared Dublin as superior to any of Mick O'Dwyer's Kerry teams, writing in the Sunday Independent: "Dublin played out the last 10 minutes [of the 2019 final replay] like the Harlem Globetrotters. It was exhibition stuff".
