= 1978 All-Ireland Senior Football Championship final =

- Event: 1978 All-Ireland Senior Football Championship
Dublin	Kerry
0–9 (9)	5–11 (26)
- Date: 24 September 1978
- Venue: Croke Park, Dublin
- Referee: Séamus Aldridge (Kildare)
- Attendance: 71,503
- Weather: Drizzle

The 1978 All-Ireland Senior Football Championship final was the 91st All-Ireland Final and the deciding match of the 1978 All-Ireland Senior Football Championship, an inter-county Gaelic football tournament for the top teams in Ireland.

This was one of six All-Ireland SFC finals contested by both Dublin and Kerry between 1974 and 1986, a period when one of either team always contested the decider. Dublin had won the previous two finals and were bidding for a third consecutive victory. Kerry, their opponents, denied them to secure their own third from four All-Ireland football titles they won during the 1970s. This was Kerry's first of four consecutive championships, setting them on the streak that inspired the five in a row that never occurred.

In 2018, Martin Breheny listed this as the eighth greatest All-Ireland Senior Football Championship Final. It is also noted for a famous first-half goal by Mikey Sheehy, with Sheehy lobbing the Dublin goalkeeper Paddy Cullen while Cullen argued with referee Séamus Aldridge.

== Match ==
This year's final was played on 24 September.

=== Summary ===
Dublin played the opening half towards the Railway End of Croke Park, that part of the stadium featuring Hill 16. Kerry played the first half towards the Canal End.

Dublin dominated the opening third. Their goalkeeper Paddy Cullen, according to Con Houlihan, caught "a few swirling lofted balls, dropping almost onto his crossbar... as composed and technically correct as if being done to illustrate a text book". Cullen's distribution was also perfect during this period of the game. Dublin's "swift triangular" play led Kerry to foul their opponents and Jimmy Keaveney duly converted the frees. Kerry forward Eoin Liston roamed so far down field that his marker Séan Doherty was within sight of the Kerry goal.

With 25 minutes gone, Dublin were ahead by 0–6 to 0–1. Dublin kept confidently going forward until a quick brace of passes from Jack O'Shea and Pat Spillane put John Egan through on Cullen in the Dublin goal. Cullen was not far enough forward. He set off only for Egan to fist the football over his head and into the Dublin net. Kerry, encouraged, scored a few points only for Dublin to take the lead with a point of their own.

John O'Keeffe took a free, deep within the Kerry half. Jack O'Shea caught the football and drove it on a long central trajectory to the 21-yard line. A fist from Mikey Sheehy sent the football behind Dublin's backs. Dublin goalkeeper Paddy Cullen kicked the ball away from Sheehy. Referee Séamus Aldridge blew his whistle for a Kerry free. Sheehy then scored his famous lobbed goal, while Cullen argued with Aldridge. Michael O'Hehir's befuddled live television commentary went: "Paddy Cullen going out for it... And Paddy Cullen... Oh dearie me. Paddy Cullen adjudged... Oh! A goal, in the greatest freak of all time! The referee gave a free to, eh, Kerry from the 14 metre line, here it is again. Nobody was expecting the ball to be kicked, and before Paddy Cullen could get back into the goal, the ball was in the net". The manner of the goal is still contentious today. While Aldridge had awarded a free to Kerry, there are those who maintain that Ger Power had fouled Cullen shortly before. In any event, Sheehy lobbed the ball over Cullen to give his team the lead. RTÉ chose it as one of the Top 20 GAA Moments in 2005 and it features prominently in the 1978 episode of Reeling in the Years. According to Martin Breheny, it is also one of the most viewed incidents from the GAA's archives.

Dublin's resistance collapsed in the second half. The half ended in a score of 3–8 to 0–2 in Kerry's favour. Eoin Liston scored the three second-half goals. Kerry won by seventeen points.

=== Details ===
24 September 1978
Final

Dublin	0–9 – 5–11	Kerry
J Keaveney 0–8, B Brogan 0–1		E Liston 3–2, M Sheehy 1–4, J Egan 1–2, J O'Shea 0–1, G Power 0–1, P Spillane 0–1

Croke Park, Dublin
Attendance: 71,503
Referee: Séamus Aldridge (Kildare)

Dublin
Kerry

==== Dublin ====
- 1 P. Cullen
- 2 G. O'Driscoll
- 3 S. Doherty
- 4 R. Kelleher
- 5 T. Drumm
- 6 K. Moran
- 7 P. O'Neill
- 8 B. Mullins
- 9 B. Brogan
- 10 A. O'Toole
- 11 T. Hanahoe (c)
- 12 D. Hickey
- 13 B. Doyle
- 14 J. Keaveney
- 15 J. McCarthy

Subs not used
16 P. Hogan
17 J. Brogan
18 P. O'Reilly
19 F. Ryder
20 D. Maher
21 P. Gogarty

Manager
T. Hanahoe

==== Kerry ====
- 1 C. Nelligan
- 2 J. Deenihan
- 3 J. O'Keeffe
- 4 M. Spillane
- 5 P. Ó Sé
- 6 T. Kennelly
- 7 P. Lynch
- 8 J. O'Shea
- 9 S. Walsh
- 10 G. Power
- 11 D. Moran (c)
- 12 P. Spillane
- 13 M. Sheehy
- 14 E. Liston
- 15 J. Egan

Sub used
20 Paudie O'Mahony for J. Deenihan

Subs not used
16 J. Mulvihill
17 V. O'Connor
18 P. O'Mahony
19 G. Griffin
21 P. McCarthy
22 M. O'Sullivan
23 T. Bridgeman
24 G. O'Driscoll

Manager
M. O'Dwyer

== Post-match ==
In the Evening Press the following day, Con Houlihan memorably described Cullen's misfortune: "Paddy dashed back towards his goal like a woman who smells a cake burning. The ball won the race and it curled inside the near post as Paddy crashed into the outside of the net and lay against it like a fireman who had returned to find his station ablaze".

Cullen and Sheehy recreated the goal in 2017 as part of the centenary commemorations of Austin Stacks (the club of Sheehy and Ger Power in Tralee). Cullen donned an apron for the occasion and roared "Me cake" as he ran towards the goal.

Kevin Moran was a member of the losing Dublin team that day. Moran is known to the English (and others) for his time spent playing soccer with Manchester United.
