= Brian Mullins =

Irish Gaelic footballer and manager (1942–2022)

Personal information
- Native name: Brian Ó Maoláin (Irish)
- Born: 27 September 1954 Clontarf, Dublin, Ireland
- Died: 30 September 2022 (aged 68) Dublin, Ireland
- Occupation: Director of Sport
- Height: 6 ft 2 in (188 cm)

Sport
- Sport: Gaelic football
- Position: Midfield
Club
- Years: Club
- 1972–1991: St Vincent's
Club titles
- Dublin titles: 5
- Leinster titles: 3
- All-Ireland Titles: 1
Inter-county
Years	County	Apps (scores)
1974–1985	Dublin	? (10–14)
Inter-county titles
- Leinster titles: 9
- All-Irelands: 4
- NFL: 2
- All Stars: 2

Brian Mullins (27 September 1954 – 30 September 2022) was an Irish Gaelic football manager and player. He played football with his local club St Vincent's and was a senior member of the Dublin county team from 1974 until 1985. Mullins later served as manager of both Dublin and Derry. He was regarded as one of Dublin's greatest-ever players. He was a nephew of Bill Casey, who played for Kerry in the 1930s and 1940s.

== Biography ==
Mullins was born in Dublin in 1954. He received his primary and secondary education in Dublin before later attending Thomond College in Limerick. Here Mullins completed a Bachelor of Arts in physical education and Irish.

Mullins subsequently returned to Dublin where he secured a teaching job in Greendale Community School in Kilbarrack on the north side of the city. Here he taught his degree subjects as well history and geography. In 1980 he took eighteen months leave of absence from Greendale to complete a Master of Arts in athletics administration at New York University.

When Mullins returned from the United States he resumed his teaching post at Greendale and stayed there until 1991. That year he was appointed Head Teacher of Carndonagh Community School in Inishowen, County Donegal, Ireland.

Mullins returned to Dublin in 2000 to take up his role as UCD Director of Sport.

In May 2020, the Irish Independent named Mullins at number seven in its "Top 20 footballers in Ireland over the past 50 years".

His son, Nathan, holds an Ulster Senior Football Championship medal from 2018.

== Playing career ==
=== Club ===
Mullins played his club football with the St Vincent's club in Dublin and had much success during a career that spanned three decades.

Mullins first came to prominence on the club scene as a member of the senior team in the early 1970s. In 1972, Mullins lined out in his first county championship decider. College side UCD provided the opposition on that occasion and a close game developed. Key goals by St Vincent's proved the difference as Mullins's side won by 2–8 to 0–9. It was his first county senior championship winners' medal. St Vincent's subsequently represented the county in the provincial club series of games and even reached the final. Westmeath champions the Downs were the opponents. The game turned into a complete rout as Mullins's side took complete control. A 6–10 to 2–5 score line gave St Vincent's a first Leinster club title. An All-Ireland final against Cork champions Nemo Rangers followed for Mullins. The sides were level six times in that game and a pointed free by Jimmy Keaveney secured a draw. The replay saw St. Vincent's being completely outclassed as Nemo won by 4–6 to 0–10.

St Vincent's lost out to UCD in the next two county finals; however, both sides met in the championship decider for a fourth consecutive year in 1975. Mullins's side were awarded the title after the collegians gave them a walkover due to the final clashing with the university exams. A second provincial championship decider quickly followed for Mullins. St Joseph's provided the opposition, however, the Laois county champions were easily accounted for by 3–9 to 1–8. It was Mullins's second Leinster club winners' medal. A second All-Ireland club final appearance followed with Roscommon Gaels lining out in opposition. The game was a complete mismatch as St Vincent's secured a huge 4–10 to 0–5 victory. It was Mullins's first All-Ireland club winners' medal.

Mullins picked up a third county winners' medal in 1976, as St Vincent's retained their title after a narrow 3–12 to 1–15 victory over UCD. Their provincial run of success came to a halt in the early rounds of that series of games.

In 1977, St Vincent's made it three-in-a-row with another huge county final victory. It was Mullins's fourth county title. In spite of some great displays in the county champions, St Vincent's were later defeated by Summerhill of Meath in the Leinster final.

St Vincent's went into decline for the next few years while Mullins missed the club's county final victory in 1981.

In 1984, Mullins was back in yet another county final. Na Fianna provided the opposition, however, St. Vincent's engineered a win and Mullins added a fifth winners' medal to his collection in that competition. He later collected a third Leinster club winners' medal following a ten-point win over Wicklow champions Tinahely. The subsequent All-Ireland club final pitted St. Vincent's against Castleisland Desmonds of Kerry. The game has gone down in history as one of the most tense championship deciders of all-time that featured a dramatic finish. With two minutes left Mullins's side had a 0–7 to 1–2 lead. A line ball by Castleisland's Willie O'Connor found Donie Buckley who sent the ball into the net. St Vincent's had no time to launch a comeback and the Kerrymen secured a remarkable 2–2 to 0–7 victory.

In 1991, Mullins captained St Vincent's to win their third Intermediate Football Championship, beating St Brigid's in the Final. This was his last competitive outing as he retired after the game.

=== Under-21 ===
Mullins first came to prominence on the inter-county scene as a member of a very good Dublin under-21 team in the early 1970s. In 1974 'the Dubs' reached the provincial decider in that grade for the first time ever. Wexford provided the opposition on that occasion, however, Mullins's side had a relatively easy victory. The 1–10 to 0–8 score line gave him a first Leinster under-21 title. Dublin were subsequently defeated in the All-Ireland semi-final.

In 1975 Mullins lined out in a second consecutive provincial under-21 final. 'The Dubs' retained their title on that occasion following a 0–12 to 1–6 defeat of Laois. An All-Ireland final appearance quickly followed for Mullins. Kerry, a team that he would later become very familiar with, were the opponents. The Munster men made no mistake and secured a 1–15 to 0–10 defeat of Mullins's side.

=== Senior ===
By this stage Mullins was carving out a reputation for himself as a midfielder of note on the Dublin senior team. In 1974 he played in his first Leinster final in that grade. Archrivals Meath set out to stop 'the Dubs' claiming a first provincial title since 1965. A new look Dublin under the stewardship of Kevin Heffernan made no mistake in securing a 1–14 to 1–9 victory. It was Mullins's first Leinster winners' medal in the senior grade. Dublin later surprisingly defeated All-Ireland title-holders Cork in the semi-final, thus booking a place in the All-Ireland final against Galway. The men from the west, who had been beaten in two of the previous three championship deciders, took a 1–4 to 0–5 lead at half-time, however, the real turning point of the game came in the 52nd minute. Galway were awarded a penalty which Liam Sammon stepped up to take. Goalkeeper Paddy Cullen made no mistake and saved the shot. 'The Dubs' later went on to take the lead as Galway collapsed. A 0–14 to 1–6 score line resulted in a first All-Ireland winners' medal for Mullins and a first for Dublin in eleven years.

Dublin proved that their success in 1974 was not a flash-in-the-pan by retaining the Leinster title in 1975 after an enormous 3–13 to 0–8 defeat of Kildare. Mullins's side were the red-hot favourites going into the All-Ireland final against one of the youngest Kerry teams of all time. On a rain-soaked day John Egan and substitute Ger O'Driscoll scored two goals for Kerry and 'the Dubs' were ambushed by 2–12 to 0–11. It was a bitter defeat for a Dublin team that had expected so much.

Dublin continued their dominance in 1976. After securing the National League title 'the Dubs' dominated the provincial championship once again. A narrow 2–8 to 1–9 defeat of Meath gave Mullins a third consecutive Leinster winners' medal. Once again it was Kerry who provided the opposition, as one of the great rivalries of football entered a new chapter. Both sides were hoping for success, however, new 'Dub' Kevin Moran was causing havoc with the Kerry defence. Immediately after the game started he careered through the Kerry half-back and full-back lines, however, his shot at goal went wide. This set the pace for the rest of the match. John McCarthy finished a five-man move to score Dublin's first goal of the day. A converted penalty by Jimmy Keaveney was followed by a third goal from Mullins. A 3–8 to 0–10 score line gave Dublin the title and gave Mullins a second All-Ireland winners' medal. He capped off the year by collecting his first All-Star award.

The 1977 Leinster final was a replay of the previous year with the result being the same. Meath provided some stiff opposition but fell short, eventually losing the game by 1–9 to 0–8. It was Mullins's fourth consecutive Leinster title. Dublin later took on Kerry for the third consecutive year, however, this time it was in the All-Ireland semi-final. In one of the greatest games of football ever-played 'the Dubs' triumphed and booked a final spot against Armagh. An eight-goal thriller ensued, with Jimmy Keaveney scoring the first of the day after just ninety seconds. He ended the day with a record 2–6 from play. Bobby Doyle soon followed with the first of his two goals while John McCarthy got a fifth. Armagh were awarded two penalties, however, the northerners spurned some golden goal-scoring opportunities. A huge 5–12 to 3–6 victory gave Dublin a second consecutive title and gave Mullins a third All-Ireland winners' medal in four years. He was later presented with a second All-Star award.

1978 saw Mullins add a second National League title to his collection. A fifth consecutive Leinster winners' medal soon followed as Dublin accounted for Kildare. The eleven-point victory in this game made Mullins's side the favourites to secure a remarkable third All-Ireland title in-a-row. While the game should have been an historic occasion, a rout ensued. The game is chiefly remembered for Mikey Sheehy's sensational goal. A free was awarded and the Kerry forward lobbed the ball over the head of Paddy Cullen, who was caught off his line arguing with the referee. New full-forward Eoin Liston entered the record books as he scored a hat-trick of goals. Pat Spillane played all over the field, including goalkeeper after Charlie Nelligan was sent off. At the full-time whistle Kerry were the winners by 5–11 to 0–9.

Dublin and Mullins secured an historic sixth Leinster title in 1979 after a narrow 1–8 to 0–9 victory over a resurgent Offaly team. A record sixth consecutive All-Ireland final appearance soon followed, with Kerry providing the opposition for the fourth time in those six years. The reigning champions, however, were handicapped throughout the game. Ger Power did not start, while John O'Keeffe got injured and Páidí Ó Sé was sent off during the encounter. Two goals by Mikey Sheehy and a third by John Egan helped 'the Kingdom' to another huge 3–13 to 1–8 defeat of Dublin.

In 1980 Dublin set out to atone for developing a reputation as Kerry's whipping boys. A record seventh consecutive Leinster title looked likely, however, in June of that year tragedy struck. Mullins was driving out the Clontarf Road in Dublin when his Fiat 127 went out of control and collided with a lamp post. The midfielder was lucky to escape with his life, however, it now looked as if the injuries which he sustained would signal the end of his football career. Nothing could be further from Mullins's mind. He completed his studies in the United States while he recovered, a miraculous recovery which saw him return to the Dublin team.

In 1983 Mullins was back as a midfield marshal as 'the Dubs' took on reigning All-Ireland champions Offaly in the Leinster final. A five-point victory on that occasion gave him a seventh provincial winners' medal, a truly remarkable achievement after his accident. A thrilling draw and a replay against Cork allowed Dublin to advance to an All-Ireland final meeting with Galway. Both sides played on a day when the rain spoilt what has gone down in history as the dirtiest championship decider ever played. Barney Rock scored an opportunist goal ten minutes into the game when a Galway kick-out found him unmarked. Ray Hazley, Kieran Duff and Mullins were all sent-off for Dublin while Galway's Tomás Tierney was also dismissed. In spite of this Dublin's 'twelve apostles' hung on to secure a 1–10 to 1–8 victory and a fourth and final All-Ireland winners' medal for Mullins.

Dublin, as reigning champions, entered the centenary year championship of 1984 as favourites to retain the All-Ireland title. This favourites tag was justified as Mullins added an eighth Leinster title to his collection before later lining out in the All-Ireland decider. Kerry, a team that had carved out a reputation as one of the greatest of all-time over the previous decade, provided the opposition and a great game was expected. The spectators were disappointed as Kerry dominated the proceedings and Mullins's side collapsed. Only two of his teammates scored, including a goal from Barney Rock. At the full-time whistle Kerry were the new champions by 0–14 to 1–6.

By 1985 many of the iconic Dublin players from the previous decade had retired from inter-county duty. Mullins, however, was still patrolling the midfield area. He won a ninth Leinster winners' medal that year as Laois were defeated by 0–10 to 0–4 in the provincial decider. A ninth All-Ireland final appearance beckoned for Mullins, with Kerry providing the opposition for a second consecutive year. Jack O'Shea got Kerry on the way and scored a key penalty goal after just eleven minutes. By half-time Kerry had stormed into a nine-point lead. 'The Dubs' came storming back with full-forward Joe McNally scoring two goals. The gap could not be bridged, however, and Kerry won by 2–10 to 2–8. Following this game Mullins decided to retire from inter-county football.

== Post-playing career ==
Mullins retired from inter-county football in 1985, and became the caretaker manager for Dublin in 1986, along with Sean Doherty (GAA player) and Robbie Kelleher. The stint only lasted a year and ended with a disappointing loss to rivals Meath. Meath had been in the GAA wilderness for 16 years so, a loss to Meath in the Leinster final came as a shock.

Early in 1996, he was appointed senior manager of Derry county team and stayed for three seasons. He won a league title in 1996, was beaten by Cavan by a point in the 1997 Ulster final before going one better in 1998 to win the county's last Ulster title until 2022.

In 2008, there was speculation that Mullins would succeed Paul Caffrey as Dublin manager. However, he turned down the job. He had withdrawn his name from consideration on the previous occasion when the post was vacant in 2004 after a breakdown in negotiations with the Dublin County Board. Mullins gave an exclusive interview to Gary Moran of RTÉ Sport for the Sunday Sport programme of Sunday 21 November 2004 in which he explained his decision, including the board's failure to match his ambition for Dublin football and the fact that he had no communication from the County Board for over three months after attending an interview for the post, a period during which the post was offered to at least two other high-profile figures, including Mick O'Dwyer.

== Death ==
On Friday, 30 September 2022 Mullins’ death was announced just days after his 68th Birthday. The announcement was met with tributes from many across Irish social, political and sporting life. Dublin GAA described Mullins as a 'giant' who 'helped light the touchpaper that reignited Dublin's fire almost 50 years ago’.

A minute silence was held in Parnell Park for Mullins during the Dublin Senior Camogie Final between Mullins’ St.Vincent's and Na Fianna CLG just hours after the announcement of his death.

Sporting positions
Preceded by Tommy Drumm	Dublin Senior Football Captain; 1985	Succeeded by John O'Leary
Preceded by Kevin Heffernan	Dublin Senior Football Manager (jointly with Seán Doherty & Robbie Kelleher); 1986	Succeeded by Gerry McCaul
Preceded by Mickey Moran	Derry Senior Football Manager; 1995–1998	Succeeded by Éamonn Coleman
