= Top 20 GAA Moments =

Top 20 GAA Moments is a poll of the best moments of Gaelic football and hurling in the television era.

== Background ==
In early 2005, the Irish public chose its favourite from 20 memorable moments from the last 40 years, as selected by ten RTÉ sports personalities and featured on the Sunday Sport programme. The number one moment was revealed in a special broadcast on Saturday 7 May 2005, the eve of the beginning of the All-Ireland hurling and football championships.

The special programme included the views of the ten judges, Des Cahill, Jim Carney, Ger Canning, Brian Carthy, Michael Lyster, Jimmy Magee, Marty Morrissey, Tony O'Donoghue, Micheál Ó Muircheartaigh and Darragh Maloney. There were also discussions with former players as to their views regarding the best moments.

As the programme was made in 2005 it does not feature more recent GAA highlights, such as Kevin Cassidy's long-range winner against Kildare in stoppage time at the end of extra-time in the 2011 All-Ireland quarter-final, or Michael Murphy's thunderbolt of a piledriver into the back of the net in the third minute of the 2012 All-Ireland Senior Football Championship Final.

== List of "moments" ==
Gaelic football
Hurling

1	Michael Donnellan's solo run	1998 All-Ireland Senior Football Championship Final	Galway	Kildare	Croke Park	26 September 1998
2	Maurice Fitzgerald's sideline point	2001 All-Ireland Quarter-Final	Kerry	Dublin	Semple Stadium	4 August 2001
3	Séamus Darby's last-minute goal	1982 All-Ireland Final	Offaly	Kerry	Croke Park	16 September 1982
4	John Fenton's goal	1987 Munster Semi-Final replay	Cork	Limerick	Semple Stadium	28 June 1987
5	Davy Fitzgerald's penalty goal	1995 Munster Final	Clare	Limerick	Semple Stadium	9 July 1995
6	Kevin Foley's goal	1991 Leinster first round, third replay	Meath	Dublin	Croke Park	6 July 1991
7	D. J. Carey's point	2002 All-Ireland Final	Kilkenny	Clare	Croke Park	8 September 2002
8	Joe Connolly's victory speech	1980 All-Ireland Final	Galway	Limerick	Croke Park	7 September 1980
9	Jack O'Shea's goal	1981 All-Ireland Final	Kerry	Offaly	Croke Park	20 September 1981
10	Offaly comeback	1994 All-Ireland Final	Offaly	Limerick	Croke Park	4 September 1994
11	Mattie McDonagh's goal	1966 All-Ireland Final	Galway	Meath	Croke Park	25 September 1966
12	Mikey Sheehy's lob goal	1978 All-Ireland Final	Kerry	Dublin	Croke Park	24 September 1978
13	Babs Keating's barefoot play	1971 All-Ireland Final	Tipperary	Kilkenny	Croke Park	5 September 1971
14	Peter Canavan's return	2003 All-Ireland Final	Tyrone	Armagh	Croke Park	28 September 2003
15	Jimmy Barry-Murphy's goal	1973 All-Ireland Senior Football Championship Final	Cork	Galway	Croke Park	23 September 1973
16	Eddie Keher's first goal	1972 All-Ireland Senior Hurling Championship Final	Kilkenny	Cork	Croke Park	3 September 1972
17	Paddy Cullen's penalty save	1974 All-Ireland Final	Dublin	Galway	Croke Park	22 September 1974
18	Barney Rock's "goal"	1986–87 National Football League quarter-final	Dublin	Cork	Croke Park	5 April 1987
19	Frank McGuigan's point-scoring	1984 Ulster Final	Tyrone	Armagh	St Tiernach's Park	15 July 1984
20	Offaly fans' sit-down protest	1998 All-Ireland Semi-Final, first replay	Offaly	Clare	Croke Park	22 August 1998
