= Five in a Row (1982 song) =

Song
- Released: 1982
- Genre: Comedy
- Songwriter(s): Declan Lynch

"Five in a Row" was a song released in advance of the 1982 All-Ireland Senior Football Championship Final to celebrate Kerry's imminent winning of five consecutive titles. The Irish Times has described it as "infamous".

The song's chorus features such lines as: "Five in a row, five in a row, never again will there be five in a row" and "It's hard to believe we've won the five in a row".

Kerry, however, had not won the fifth title; they still had a game to play and faced Offaly in the decider. Offaly manager Eugene McGee played the song in his team's dressing room ahead of the game. With Kerry leading by two points approaching the game's conclusion, Séamus Darby scored a critical goal (worth three points) to give Offaly the lead. The referee then blew the final whistle, thus restricting Kerry to just the four.

Radio Kerry played the song in September 2018 when the county minor team did what the 1982 team could not.

The song also featured in the documentary Players of the Faithful, which first aired on national television's RTÉ One in December 2018.

The national media referred to the 1982 song in the build-up to the 2019 All-Ireland Senior Football Championship Final, with Dublin — bidding to do what Kerry had not in 1982 — meeting Kerry in the decider. Dublin did it; however, the song's lyrics refer specifically to Kerry...
