= Kerry–Offaly Gaelic football rivalry =

Football rivalry

Kerry-Offaly
- Location: County Kerry; County Offaly
- Teams: Kerry; Offaly
- First meeting: Kerry 0-10 - 0-7 Offaly; 1969 All-Ireland final (28 September 1969)
- Latest meeting: Offaly 1-15 - 0-17 Kerry; 1982 All-Ireland final (19 September 1982)

Statistics
- Total meetings: 6
- Most wins: Kerry (3)
- All-time series: Kerry 3-1-2 Offaly
- Largest victory: Offaly 1-19 - 0-13 Kerry; 1972 All-Ireland final replay (15 October 1972)

The Kerry-Offaly rivalry is a Gaelic football rivalry between Irish county teams Kerry and Offaly, who first played each other in 1969. It was considered to be one of the biggest rivalries in Gaelic games during the 1980s. Kerry's home ground is Fitzgerald Stadium and Offaly's home ground is O'Connor Park, however, all of their championship meetings have been held at neutral venues, usually Croke Park.

While Kerry have the highest number of Munster titles and Offaly lie in fourth position behind Dublin, Meath and Kildare on the roll of honour in Leinster, they have also enjoyed success in the All-Ireland Senior Football Championship, having won 40 championship titles between them to date.

== All-time results ==
=== Legend ===
Kerry win
Offaly win
Match was a draw

=== Senior ===
No.	Date	Winners	Score	Runners-up	Venue	Stage
1.	28 September 1969	Kerry	0-10 - 0-7	Offaly	Croke Park	All Ireland final
2.	24 September 1972	Kerry	1-13 - 1-13	Offaly	Croke Park	All Ireland final
3.	15 October 1972	Offaly	1-19 - 0-13	Kerry	Croke Park	All Ireland final replay
4.	24 August 1980	Kerry	4-15 - 4-10	Offaly	Croke Park	All Ireland semi-final
5.	20 September 1981	Kerry	1-12 - 0-8	Offaly	Croke Park	All Ireland final
6.	19 September 1982	Offaly	1-15 - 0-17	Kerry	Croke Park	All Ireland final
