= Tim Kennelly =

Irish Gaelic footballer (1954–2005)

Personal information
- Native name: Tadhg Mac an Fhailí (Irish)
- Nickname: Horse
- Born: 6 July 1954 Listowel, County Kerry, Ireland
- Died: 6 December 2005 (aged 51) Listowel, County Kerry, Ireland
- Occupations: Farmer and publican

Sport
- Sport: Gaelic football
- Position: Centre-back
Club
- Years: Club
- Listowel Emmets
Club titles
- Kerry titles: 2
Inter-county*
Years	County	Apps (scores)
1974–1984	Kerry	31 (0–01)
Inter-county titles
- Munster titles: 9
- All-Irelands: 5
- NFL: 3
- All Stars: 2
- *Inter County team apps and scores correct as of 21:14, 9 August 2012.

Tim Kennelly (6 July 1954 – 6 December 2005) was an Irish Gaelic footballer. His league and championship career at senior level with the Kerry county team spanned ten years from 1974 to 1984.

Born just outside Listowel, County Kerry, Kennelly played competitive Gaelic football in his youth. He came to prominence with the Listowel Emmets club, winning two divisional junior championship medals as well as a county junior championship medal in 1972. Kennelly was a regular on the Feale Rangers divisional team over a ten-year period, and won two county senior championship medals.

Kennelly made his debut on the inter-county scene at the age of seventeen when he was picked on the Kerry minor team. He had two championship seasons with the minor team, however, he was a Munster runner-up on both occasions. Kennelly subsequently joined the Kerry under-21 team, winning two All-Ireland medals as a substitute in 1973 and on the field of play in 1975. By this stage he had also joined the Kerry senior team, making his debut during the 1974–75 league. Over the course of the next ten years, Kennelly won five All-Ireland medals, beginning with a lone triumph in 1975 before a record-equalling four championships in-a-row from 1978 to 1981. He also won nine Munster medals, three National Football League medals and claimed back-to-back All Stars in 1979 and 1980. He played his last competitive game for Kerry in February 1984, but remained on the panel for the subsequent provincial championship.

After being chosen on the Munster interprovincial team for the first time in 1977, Kennelly was an automatic choice on the team for six successive championships. During that time he won four Railway Cup medals.

Kennelly's two sons also played for Kerry. Noel Kennelly won an All-Ireland medal in 2000 while Tadhg Kennelly claimed a winners' medal in 2009, having earlier become the first Irish person to win an AFL Premiership medal with Sydney Swans.

== Biography ==
Tim Kennelly was born in Listowel, County Kerry, in 1954. He grew up on the family farm in Coolaclarig, an area that had a great tradition for Gaelic football. As a young boy, Kennelly showed great skill as a footballer, and his father had influence on his subsequent inter-county career.

Kennelly was a publican by profession. His sons, Noel and Tadhg, also represented their native county in football. Noel won an All-Ireland medal with Kerry in 2000. Tadhg later played Australian rules football in the AFL with the Sydney Swans. In 2005, Tadhg became the first Irishman to win an AFL premiership medal. Tadhg returned to Ireland in 2009 and joined the Kerry senior football team, winning an All-Ireland Senior Medal and being selected as an All Star.

Tim Kennelly, who suffered from a heart condition, died on 6 December 2005.

== Playing career ==
=== Club ===
Kennelly played his club football with his local team called Listowel Emmets. He won numerous underage league and championship winners' medals before making his way onto the club's senior team. 1972 proved to be a successful year for Kennelly and for his club. He captured a North Kerry senior championship winners' medal while also winning a North Kerry league title. He finished off the year be claiming a Kerry Junior Football Championship winners' medal.

A second North Kerry championship title followed in 1976 while, two years later, in 1978 Kennelly added a second North Kerry league title to his collection. By this stage he was also lining out with divisional side Feale Rangers. An 0–8 to 0–3 defeat of Mid Kerry in 1978 gave Kennelly a county senior championship winners' medal. Two years later in 1980 Feale Rangers defeated Austin Stacks by three points, thus securing a second county senior championship title.

=== Minor and under-21 ===
By the early 1970s, Kennelly had joined the Kerry minor football team; however, he had no success in this grade as Cork dominated the provincial championship. He was promoted to the county's under-21 team, winning a Munster title in this grade in 1973. He later lined out in his first All-Ireland final at under-21 level. Mayo provided the opposition on that occasion; however, Kerry recorded a 2–13 to 0–13 victory. The win gave Kennelly an under-21 All-Ireland winners' medal.

In 1975 Kennelly captured a second Munster under-21 title following a nine-point win over Waterford. Kennelly's side later qualified for the All-Ireland final with Dublin providing the opposition. A 1–15 to 0–10 score line gave Kerry the victory and gave Kennelly a second All-Ireland winners' medal.

=== Senior ===
In 1975, a Kerry team was formed under the management of former player Mick O'Dwyer. It was the beginning of an era for Kerry football and Kennelly played a key role in orchestrating much of the success for the team that would come to be regarded as the greatest of all time. That year he won his first senior Munster title, dethroning Cork as provincial champions in the process. Kennelly later lined out in his first senior All-Ireland final. Reigning champions Dublin provided the opposition and were installed as the favourites over the youngest Kerry team of all time. On a rain-soaked day, John Egan and substitute Ger O'Driscoll scored two goals, and 'the Dubs' were ambushed with a score of 2–12 to 0–11. It was Ó Kennelly's first All-Ireland winners' medal at senior level.

In 1976, Kennelly captured his second Munster title before later lining out in his second All-Ireland final. Once again, it was Dublin who provided the opposition. New 'Dub' Kevin Moran was causing havoc with the Kerry defence. Jimmy Keaveney converted a penalty to help Dublin to a 3–8 to 0–10 victory and defeat for Kennelly.

1977 proved to be another frustrating year. The year began with Kennelly capturing a National League medal on the field of play and a third consecutive Munster title following another win over Cork. Kerry later took on Dublin for the third consecutive year, however, this time it was in the All-Ireland semi-final. In one of the greatest games of football ever-played 'the Dubs' triumphed and Kennelly was still left waiting for a second All-Ireland medal.

In 1978, Kerry secured a fourth Munster winners' medal in-a-row, however, Kennelly missed the provincial decider. He later returned in time for 'the Kingdom's' third All-Ireland final appearance in four years. Old rivals Dublin provided the opposition, however, the game turned into a rout. The game is chiefly remembered for Mikey Sheehy's sensational goal. The Kerry forward lobbed the ball over the head of Paddy Cullen, who was caught off his line arguing with the referee. New full-forward Eoin Liston scored a hat-trick of goals. Pat Spillane played all over the field, including goalkeeper after Charlie Nelligan was sent off. At the full-time whistle Kerry were the winners by 5–11 to 0–9.

In 1979, Kennelly, who was now captain of the side, won a fourth provincial title as Cork fell by ten points in the Munster final. He later went in search of a third All-Ireland medal as he lined out in a fourth championship decider. Dublin provided the opposition for the fifth consecutive occasion. Kerry were handicapped throughout the game. Ger Power did not start the game, while John O'Keeffe got injured and Páidí Ó Sé was sent off during the encounter. Two goals by Mikey Sheehy and a third by John Egan helped 'the Kingdom' to a 3–13 to 1–8 victory. It was Kennelly's third All-Ireland winners' medal while he also had the honour of lifting the Sam Maguire Cup.

Kerry's dominance continued in 1980. Another defeat of Cork in the provincial final gave Kennelly a fifth Munster winners' medal. Another All-Ireland final appearance beckoned, this time with Roscommon providing the opposition. The Connacht champions shocked Kerry and took a five-point lead inside the first twelve minutes. Mikey Sheehy popped up again to score the decisive goal, as Kerry went on to claim a 1–9 to 1–6 victory in a game that contained sixty-four frees. The victory gave Kerry a third All-Ireland title in succession, while Kennelly added a fourth All-Ireland winners' medal to his ever-growing collection.

In 1981 Kennelly missed Kerry's seventh consecutive Munster title, however, he later lined out in the All-Ireland final against Offaly. Kerry had an easy win with seven players combining for a great goal. He captured his fifth All-Ireland winners' medal that day as Kerry won by 1–12 to 0–8.

In 1982, Kennelly won his second National League winners' medal before Kerry secured an eighth consecutive Munster final victory over Cork. It was Kennelly's sixth provincial title in all. The All-Ireland final pitted 'the Kingdom' against Offaly for the second year in-a-row. Kerry had the upper hand for much of the game and were leading by two points with two minutes left to be played. The game, however, was not over as Offaly substitute Séamus Darby, who had entered the game almost unnoticed, produced the most spectacular of finishes by scoring a late goal. Kerry failed to score again to level the match and Offaly went on to win their third All-Ireland title ever. Kerry's five-in-a-row dream was shattered.

Kerry missed out on an historic nine-in-a-row in Munster in 1983, as Cork finally triumphed. 'The Kingdom' bounced back the following year; however, Kennelly was now on the periphery of the team while he also became a selector. He played no part on the field of play in Kerry's Munster final and All-Ireland final triumphs. Kennelly retired from inter-county football around this time.

=== Inter-provincial ===
Kennelly also lined out with Munster in the inter-provincial football competition and enjoyed much success. He first lined out with his province in 1977 as Munster defeated Connacht in the final by 1–14 to 1–9. It was his first Railway Cup winners' medal and the first of two-in-a-row for Kennelly and for Munster. After losing out in 1979 and 1980 Kennelly captured a third Railway Cup title in 1981. A one-point defeat of Connacht gave Kennelly a fourth Railway Cup winners' medal in 1982

== Career statistics ==
Team	Season	National League			Munster		All-Ireland		Total	
Team	Season	Division	Apps	Score	Apps	Score	Apps	Score	Apps	Score
Kerry	1974-75	Division 1A	6	0-00	4	0-00	0	0-00	10	0-00
Kerry	1975-76	Division 1A	6	0-00	3	0-00	2	0-01	11	0-01
Kerry	1976-77	Division 1 (South)	5	0-00	2	0-00	1	0-00	8	0-00
Kerry	1977-78	Division 1 (South)	5	0-00	2	0-00	2	0-00	9	0-00
Kerry	1978-79	Division 1 (South)	5	0-01	2	0-00	2	0-00	9	0-01
Kerry	1979-80	Division 1 (South)	7	0-00	1	0-00	2	0-00	10	0-00
Kerry	1980-81	Division 1	6	0-00	0	0-00	2	0-00	8	0-00
Kerry	1981-82	Division 1	13	0-01	3	0-00	2	0-00	18	0-01
Kerry	1982-83	Division 1	5	0-00	1	0-00	0	0-00	6	0-00
Kerry	1983-84	Division 1	3	0-00	0	0-00	0	0-00	3	0-00
Total			61	0-02	18	0-00	13	0-01	92	0-03

Sporting positions
Preceded by Denis 'Ogie' Moran	Kerry Senior Football Captain; 1979	Succeeded by Ger Power
Achievements
Preceded by Denis 'Ogie' Moran (Kerry)	All-Ireland SFC winning captain 1979	Succeeded by Ger Power (Kerry)
