= Players of the Faithful =

Irish documentary

- Genre: Documentary
- Starring: Séamus Darby; Martin Furlong; Gerry Carroll; Matt Connor; Richie Connor; Eugene McGee
- Country of origin: Ireland

Production
- Production company: Loosehorse

Original release
- Network: RTÉ One
- Release: 28 December 2018

Players of the Faithful is a documentary on Offaly's bid to stop Kerry becoming the first team to win five consecutive All-Ireland Senior Football Championships in 1982.

Loosehorse were responsible for putting it together; it followed on from their documentary Micko which debuted earlier that year.

It first aired on RTÉ One on Friday 28 December 2018 at 9:30 pm. At that time Dublin had just won their fourth consecutive All-Ireland Senior Football Championship and would be bidding for their fifth in 2019. Players of the Faithful was repeated on RTÉ One on the night of 1 September 2019, following The Sunday Game's highlights of the drawn 2019 All-Ireland Senior Football Championship Final in which Dublin's opponents were Kerry.

The title is a pun both on Offaly's nickname ("The Faithful County") and the series of prayers said by members of the Catholic Church.

The documentary shows how Bord na Móna and the ESB's role in employing young local men during this time led to many footballers for the county to choose from. It features contributions from five members of the 1982 Offaly team, including goalkeeper Martin Furlong (who saved a Mikey Sheehy penalty) and Séamus Darby (who scored the most famous goal in the sport's history past Charlie Nelligan). Also featured are brothers Matt and Richie Connor and Gerry Carroll. Carroll and Furlong are interviewed in New York, to where they both moved in later life. Also featured was 1982 Offaly manager Eugene McGee. McGee died shortly afterwards.
