= David Farrell (Gaelic footballer) =

Irish Gaelic footballer

Personal information
- Born: Camp, County Kerry

Sport
- Sport: Gaelic football
- Position: Forward
Club
- Years: Club
- 1980s-1990s: Annascaul
Club titles
- Kerry titles: 1
Inter-county
Years	County	Apps (scores)
1990-1991	Kerry	5 (2-01)
Inter-county titles
- Munster titles: 1
- All-Irelands: 0
- All Stars: 0

David Farrell was Gaelic footballer from Camp, County Kerry. He played with Kerry during the late 1980s and 1990s. He won an All Ireland Minor medal and an Under 21 All Ireland medal. He played his club football with Annascaul and West Kerry.

== Club ==
Farrell played club football with Annascaul. He won a County Intermediate Championship in 1992 and helped the club to the County Senior Football Championship final in 1993 when they lost out to Laune Rangers. He won a Kerry Senior Football Championship in 1990 with West Kerry.

== Underage ==
He was part of the Kerry minor team in 1988. Kerry beat Cork in the Munster final and later Dublin in the All-Ireland final ending a successful year for Farrell.

He later joined the Under 21 team where he had more success. He first joined the team in 1990, where he played in all of Kerry's games as a win over Cork in the Munster final and Tyrone in the All-Ireland final.

He was still underage in 1991 and won a second Munster title after overcoming Cork. Kerry faced Tyrone in the All-Ireland final once more. However the title went to the Ulster champions.

== Junior ==
Farrell had a short and unsuccessful time with the Kerry junior team. His only game was a loss to Cork in the Munster final.

== Senior ==
Farrell first played with the Kerry senior team during the 1990 Munster championship. It wasn't a good start however as his first game was the Munster final loss to Cork in one of Kerry's biggest championship losses.

He played in the 1990/91 National League playing in all but one of Kerry's games. He captained Kerry in their Munster championship quarter-final win over Tipperary. He was on the benach for the rest of Kerry's games, including the Munster final win over Limerick and All-Ireland semi-final loss to Down.

He played during the National League in 1991/92 and 1992/93, these were his last games with the county.

Sporting positions
Preceded by Joe Shannon (Gaelic footballer)	Kerry Senior Football Captain; 1991	Succeeded by Jack O'Shea
