= P. J. McGrath =

Irish Gaelic footballer (1941–2021)

Personal information
- Native name: P. S. MacCraith (Irish)
- Born: 28 March 1941 Kilmaine, County Mayo, Ireland
- Died: 22 March 2021 (aged 79) Claremorris, County Mayo, Ireland
- Occupation: Secondary school teacher
- Height: 6 ft 1.0 in (185.4 cm)

Sport
- Sport: Gaelic football
- Position: Full-back
Club
- Years: Club
- 19: Kilmaine
Club titles
- Mayo titles: 2 Intermediate/3 Junior Championships
Inter-county*
Years	County	Apps (scores)
1966	Mayo	4 (0-00)
Inter-county titles
- Connacht titles: 0
- All-Irelands: 0
- NFL: 0
- *Inter County team apps and scores correct as of 22:29, 22 March 2021.

Patrick J. McGrath (1941 – 22 March 2021) was an Irish Gaelic footballer who played as a full-back for club side Kilmaine and was a member of the Mayo senior football team, before having a lengthy career as a referee and an administrator.

== Career ==
As a player, McGrath played with club side Kilmaine, and was a member of the Mayo senior panel in 1966. He also played at full-back on that year's Mayo junior team. He was a referee from 1965 to 1997. McGrath was also heavily involved in GAA administration, serving as President of the Connacht Council, Trustee of the GAA and Chairman of the National Referees Committee. He served as chairman of the Mayo County Board from 1997 until 2002 when he contested the presidency of the GAA.

== Death ==
McGrath died aged 79 on 22 March 2021.

Achievements
Preceded by Paddy Collins	All-Ireland Senior Football Final referee 1982	Succeeded by John Gough
