= Johnny Mooney =

Offaly Gaelic footballer

Personal information
- Native name: Seán Ó Maonaigh (Irish)
- Born: 21 December 1958 (age 67) Tullamore, County Offaly, Ireland
- Occupation: Telecoms engineer
- Height: 6 ft 0 in (183 cm)

Sport
- Sport: Gaelic football
- Position: Right corner-forward/midfield
Clubs
- Years: Club
- Rhode; Raheen; Shannon Rangers; San Francisco; John Mitchel's Birmingham; Donegal New York; Laune Rangers
Club titles
- Offaly titles: 2 offaly chmps.1 new york.2 warickshire.
- Leinster titles: 2 railway cup1985.86.
Inter-county**
Years	County	Apps (scores)
1976–1992	Offaly	28 (3–24)
Inter-county titles
- Leinster titles: 3 senior.2 u 21.
- All-Irelands: 1
- NFL: 2 div 2titles
- All Stars: 0
- **Inter County team apps and scores correct as of 18:10, 30 December 2016.

Johnny Mooney (21 Dec 1958) is an Irish former Gaelic footballer. His league and championship career with the Offaly senior team spanned eighteen seasons from 1976 to 1992.

== Playing career ==
Mooney won two Leinster U21FC medals with Offaly.

He made his senior inter-county debut during the 1976 championship, becoming the youngest player ever to play for Offaly. He time playing for Offaly spanned an eighteen-season period.

Mooney won an All-Ireland SFC medal in 1982. He also won three Leinster SFC medals. He played his last game for Offaly in November 1992.

He also played on three winning "Rest of Ireland" vs Kerry games. He played against Kerry for the San Francisco Allstars in 1981 in Balboa Stadium.

Mooney was a player–manager for Warwickshire when that county won the British Championship in the early nineties. He trained and played hurling with the John Mitchel's Hurling Club in Birmingham, and played hurling for Warwickshire.

Bono wore Mooney’s Offaly jersey during a 1983 concert in Germany.

== Honours ==
Offaly

- All-Ireland Senior Football Championship (1): 1982
- Leinster Senior Football Championship (3): 1980, 1981, 1982
