= Gerard Griffin =

English cricketer

Gerard Sandiforth Featherstone Griffin (18 August 1882 – 28 December 1950) was an English first-class cricketer active between 1900 and 1903 who represented Middlesex in first class cricket fifteen times.

He was born in Shepherd's Bush in 1882 and died aged 68 in Hyde Heath.
