= John Guinan =

Offaly Gaelic footballer

Personal information
- Native name: Seán Ó Coinneáin (Irish)
- Born: 26 December 1961 (age 64) Raheen, County Offaly, Ireland
- Occupation: Engineer
- Height: 6 ft 0 in (183 cm)

Sport
- Sport: Gaelic football
- Position: Right wing-forward
Club
- Years: Club
- Raheen
Club titles
- Offaly titles: 0
Inter-county*
Years	County	Apps (scores)
1980–1989	Offaly	15 (2–10)
Inter-county titles
- Leinster titles: 2
- All-Irelands: 1
- NFL: 0
- All Stars: 0
- *Inter County team apps and scores correct as of 18:10, 30 December 2016.

John Guinan (born 26 December 1961) is an Irish former Gaelic footballer. His league and championship career with the Offaly senior team spanned ten seasons from 1980 to 1989.

Guinan made his senior debut for Offaly during the 1980–81 league. Over the course of the next ten seasons he won one All-Ireland SFC medal. Guinan also won two Leinster SFC medals. He played his last game for Offaly in November 1989.

== Honours ==
Offaly

- All-Ireland Senior Football Championship (1): 1982
- Leinster Senior Football Championship (2): 1981, 1982
