= Pádraig Dunne =

Offaly Gaelic footballer

Personal information
- Native name: Pádraig Ó Doinn (Irish)
- Nickname: Podge
- Born: 13 May 1962 (age 64) Gracefield, County Offaly, Ireland
- Occupation: Publican
- Height: 6 ft 2 in (188 cm)

Sport
- Sport: Gaelic football
- Position: Midfield
Club
- Years: Club
- 1980–1994: Gracefield
Club titles
- Offaly titles: 1
Inter-county*
Years	County	Apps (scores)
1981–1994	Offaly	30
Inter-county titles
- Leinster titles: 2
- All-Irelands: 1
- NFL: 0
- All Stars: 1
- *Inter County team apps and scores correct as of 23:10, 1 January 2017.

Pádraig Dunne (born 13 May 1962) is an Irish former Gaelic footballer. His league and championship career with the Offaly senior team spanned fourteen seasons from 1981 to 1994.

Dunne made his senior debut for Offaly during the 1981 championship. Over the course of the next fourteen seasons he won one All-Ireland SFC medal. Dunne also won two Leinster SFC medals. He played his last game for Offaly in June 1994.

== Honours ==
Gracefield

- Offaly Senior Football Championship (1): 1984

Offaly

- All-Ireland Senior Football Championship (1): 1982
- Leinster Senior Football Championship (2): 1981, 1982
