= Denis Moran (Gaelic footballer) =

Kerry Gaelic footballer

Denis 'Ogie' Moran
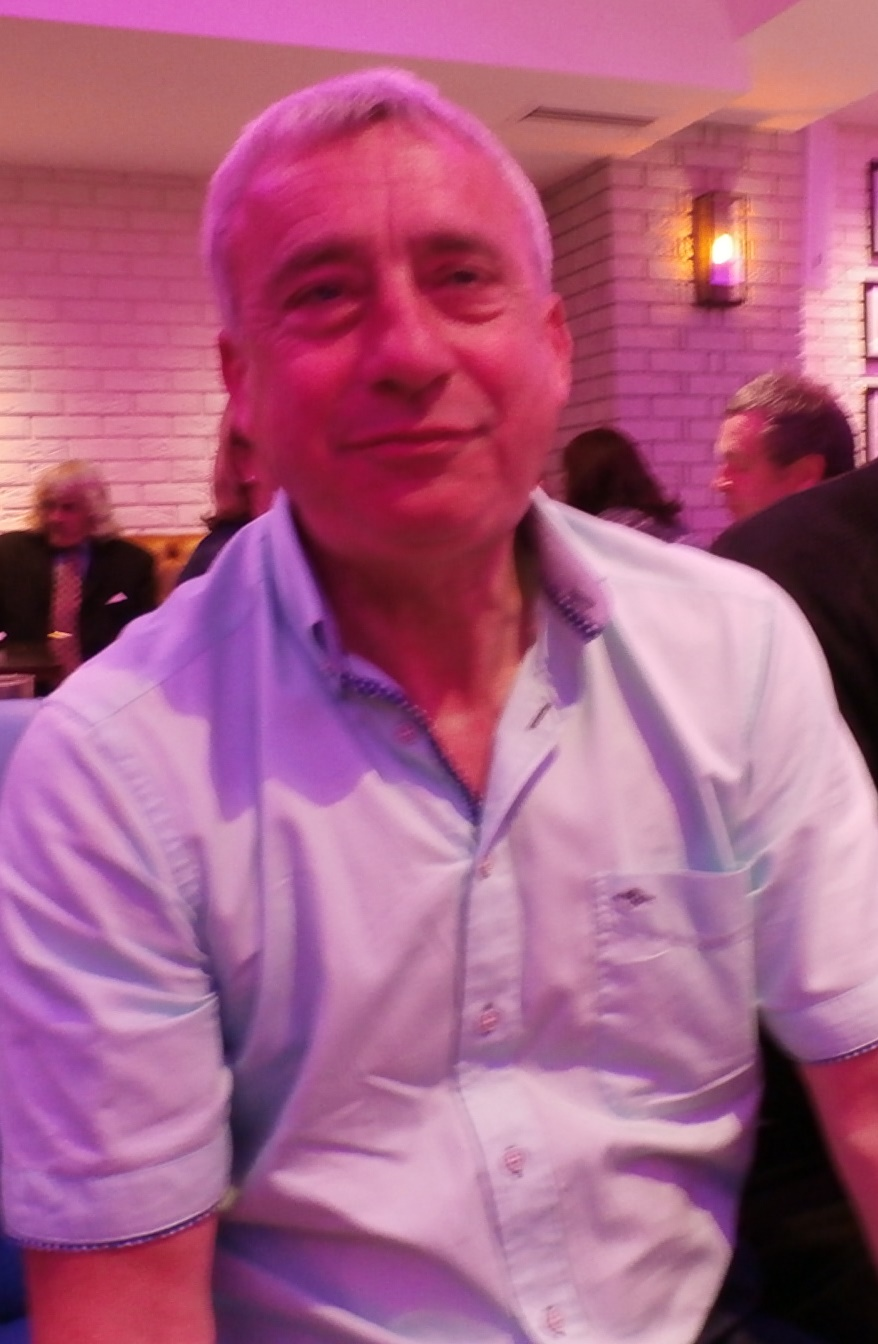

Personal information
- Native name: Donncha Ó Moráin (Irish)
- Nickname: Ogie
- Born: 16 January 1956 (age 70) Ballybunion, County Kerry
- Occupation: Shannon Development regional officer

Sport
- Sport: Gaelic football
- Position: Centre-forward
Clubs
- Years: Club
- 1970s–1990s 1970s–1980s: Beale; Shannon Rangers
Club titles
- Kerry titles: 2
Inter-county
Years	County	Apps (scores)
1975–1987	Kerry	46 (0–42)
Inter-county titles
- Munster titles: 11
- All-Irelands: 8
- NFL: 3
- All Stars: 1

Denis "Ogie" Moran (born on 16 January 1956) in Ballybunion, County Kerry) is an Irish former Gaelic footballer and manager. He played for his local club Beale, his divisional side Shannon Rangers and also at the senior level for the Kerry County team between 1975 and 1987.

== Early life ==
Denis 'Ogie' Moran was born in Ballybunion, County Kerry in 1956. Born into a family that had an interest in Gaelic games, Moran's father brought him to matches every weekend. In 1962, he travelled to Croke Park as the mascot to the Kerry team that captured the All-Ireland title.

Moran was educated at the local national school and later boarded at the famous Franciscan College in Gormanston, County Meath. Moran became a key member of the college senior team that captured three Leinster colleges' titles in a row between 1972 and 1974. In 1973, Moran's side reached the final of the All-Ireland series. St Michael's College from Enniskillen provided the opposition on that occasion and a close game developed. At the end of the game, the Franciscans had won the day by 1-8 to 1-6 and Moran picked up an All-Ireland Colleges' winners' medal.

== Playing career ==
=== Club ===
Moran played his club football and hurling throughout the 1970s and 1980s. As a footballer, he enjoyed much success with his local club Beale and as a member of the Shannon Rangers divisional side. Moran was also regarded as a hurler of note, lining out with the famous Ballyduff side in the northern part of the county.

As a key member of the Beale senior football team, Moran helped his team seven North Kerry divisional titles between 1977 and 1989. This included Beale's very first divisional title in 1977, the first of a famous three-in-a-row.

As a hurler, Moran captured numerous North Kerry divisional titles. He also claimed the ultimate honour by winning a county senior championship winners' medal.

It was with divisional side Shannon Rangers, however, that Moran enjoyed the ultimate success in terms of club football in Kerry. In 1972, he was only sixteen years-old when he was picked for the team. Rangers reached the final of the County Senior Championship that year, with Mid Kerry providing the opposition. A victory on that occasion gave Moran a county winners' medal.

Five years later, Moran lined out in his second county final, this time with nearby rivals Feale Rangers providing the opposition. Another victory followed on that occasion, giving the Beale club man a second and final county winners' medal.

=== Minor and under-21 ===
Moran first came to prominence on the inter-county scene in the early 1970s as member of the Kerry minor football team. Arch-rival Cork dominated the provincial minor championship for the early part of the decade.

Moran's performances at the minor level meant he got a spot on the Kerry under-21 team in 1975. He captured a Munster title in that grade that same year following a nine-point victory over Waterford in the provincial decider. Moran's side later qualified for the All-Ireland final against Dublin. A 1-15 to 0-10 score line gave Kerry the victory and gave Moran an All-Ireland under-21 winners' medal.

In 1976, Moran won his second in-a-row Munster under-21 title. He later lined out in a second consecutive All-Ireland final against Kildare. Kerry were victorious on this occasion, as Moran collected a second All-Ireland winners' medal following a 0-14 to 1-3 victory.

Moran captured a third provincial under-21 title in 1977 following a two-goal defeat of Cork. Kerry later qualified for a third consecutive All-Ireland final with Down providing the opposition. A 1-11 to 1-5 score line gave Kerry the victory and gave Moran a third All-Ireland under-21 winners' medal in-a-row.

=== Senior ===
By this stage, Moran was also a key member of Kerry's senior football team. In 1975, he captured his first Munster Championship and All-Ireland medals at senior level, under the new management of the legendary Mick O'Dwyer. In 1976, he won his second Munster title; however, Dublin gained revenge for the previous year by defeating Kerry in the All-Ireland final. In 1977, Kerry won another Munster title but lost out to Dublin yet again, this time in a thrilling All-Ireland semi-final.

In 1978, Moran was captain of his native county and Kerry was primed for success. They easily won another Munster title and breezed into the All-Ireland final to face Dublin. The game itself is remembered for Mikey Sheehy's goal which he scored by lobbing the ball over the head of Paddy Cullen. The final score was 5-11 to 0-9 and Moran had secured a second All-Ireland senior medal. In 1979, Kerry once again faced up against Dublin in the All-Ireland final. Like the previous year the men from "the Kingdom" had another emphatic victory over "the Dubs", and Moran claimed his third All-Ireland medal.

Victories for Kerry over Roscommon and Offaly in the respective All-Ireland finals of 1980 and 1981 brought Moran's All-Ireland medal tally up to five. In 1982 he collected his eighth consecutive Munster Championship medal and the scene was set for Kerry to become the first team in the history of the game to win five All-Ireland football titles in-a-row. Once again, Moran’s side faced Offaly in the All-Ireland final. Kerry had the upper hand for much of the game and were leading by two points with two minutes left to be played. The game, however, was not over as Offaly substitute Séamus Darby, who had entered the game almost unnoticed, produced possibly the greatest match-winner of all-time when he scored a late goal. Kerry failed to score again to level the match and Offaly went on to win their third All-Ireland title ever.

In 1983, Kerry were denied a record-breaking ninth Munster title in-a-row by Cork. Moran's side were down but not out, as they reclaimed the provincial title the following year, before securing back-to-back All-Ireland victories over their old rivals Dublin in 1984 and 1985. In 1986, he collected his third All-Ireland title in-a-row with an 8-point victory over Tyrone. It was his eighth All-Ireland medal overall. Moran also enjoyed playing Railway Cup football with Munster, winning inter-provincial titles in 1976, 1977, 1978, 1981 and 1982. His honors also include three National Football Leagues in 1977, 1982 and 1984 and one All Stars Awards. Moran also played hurling for a short period with his native county. In 1974, he won a 'Special All-Ireland' hurling medal for weaker counties when Kerry defeated Westmeath in the final.

== Managerial career ==
Kerry

Moran was appointed manager of Kerry’s senior team for the 1993 championship. His tenure as manager was not a successful one, as Billy Morgan's Cork team were the kingpins of Munster at the time. Moran was replaced as manager by Páidí Ó Sé at the end of 1995.

Kerins O'Rahilly

In 2009, Moran took over from Jack O'Connor as Kerins O'Rahilly's manager.

== Records ==
All in all Moran collected eleven Munster Championship medals, he played in ten All-Ireland finals, ending up on the winning side on eight occasions. His record haul of All-Ireland medals is a record that he shares with fellow Kerrymen Pat Spillane, Páidí Ó Sé, Ger Power and Mikey Sheehy. Moran, however, stands apart, along with Dublin's Stephen Cluxton, as the only players to win their eight medals playing in the one position. Moran was the only member of the Kerry team to have played all eight victorious All-Ireland finals. This record had been equalled only by Dublin’s James McCarthy and Stephen Cluxton.

== Personal life ==
Moran is based in Tralee and works as a regional officer with Shannon Development. His son, David, followed in Morans footsteps and, after playing with the Kerry minor team in 2006, he subsequently joined the senior team and played with Kerry in the 2006 All-Ireland Minor Football Championship final. He was added to the Kerry senior squad for the 2008 National Football League and appeared in the first three games against Donegal, Tyrone and Derry.

Sporting positions
Preceded by Ger O'Keeffe	Kerry Senior Football Captain; 1978	Succeeded by Tim Kennelly
Preceded by Mickey 'Ned' O'Sullivan	Kerry Senior Football Manager; 1992-1995	Succeeded by Páidí Ó Sé
Achievements
Preceded by Tony Hanahoe (Dublin)	All-Ireland SFC winning captain 1978	Succeeded by Tim Kennelly (Kerry)
