= 1981 All-Ireland Senior Football Championship =

Gaelic football tournament

Championship details
- Dates: 10 May – 20 September 1981
- Teams: 33

All-Ireland Champions
- Winning team: Kerry (27th win)
- Captain: Jimmy Deenihan
- Manager: Mick O'Dwyer

All-Ireland Finalists
- Losing team: Offaly
- Captain: Richie Connor
- Manager: Eugene McGee

Provincial Champions
- Munster: Kerry
- Leinster: Offaly
- Ulster: Down
- Connacht: Mayo

Championship statistics
- No. matches played: 34
- Top Scorer: Matt Connor (1–31)
- Player of the Year: Jack O'Shea

The 1981 All-Ireland Senior Football Championship was the 95th staging of the All-Ireland Senior Football Championship, the Gaelic Athletic Association's premier inter-county Gaelic football tournament. The championship began on 10 May 1981 and ended on 20 September 1981.

Kerry entered the championship as the defending champions and were hoping to win a record-equalling fourth successive championship title.

On 20 September 1981, Kerry won the championship following a 1–12 to 0–8 defeat of Offaly in the All-Ireland final. This was their 27th All-Ireland title and their fourth championship in succession.

Offaly's Matt Connor was the championship's top scorer with 1–31. Kerry's Jack O'Shea was the choice for Texaco Footballer of the Year.

== Munster Championship format change ==
The normal system of 2 Quarter-final's and 2 Semi-final's is back.

== Results ==
=== Connacht Senior Football Championship ===
Quarter-finals

30 May 1981 Quarter-final	London	1–4 – 3–11	Mayo	Emerald GAA Grounds, Ruislip
	P Maher 1–3, J Keoghan 0–1.		M Carney 1–2, J Burke 1–2, J McGrath 1–0, E McHale 0–3, J Lyons 0–2, J Maughan 0–2.	Referee: T Cunningham (Galway)

7 June 1981 Quarter-final	Galway	2–16 – 0–6	Leitrim	Tuam Stadium, Tuam
	G McManus 0–11, TJ Gilmore 1–2, S Joyce 1–0, B Brennan 0–2, T Naughton 0–1.		F Smith 0–2, J Ward 0–1, M Quinn 0–1, J Logan 0–1, S Tighe 0–1.	Referee: PJ McGrath (Mayo)

Semi-finals

14 June 1981 Semi-final	Sligo	2–9 – 1–8	Roscommon	Markievicz Park, Sligo
	J Kearins 2–1, J Kent 0–3, M Hoey 0–3, PJ Kavanagh 0–1, J Stenson 0–1.		D Earley 1–3, L Dolphin 0–2, J O'Gara 0–1, T McManus 0–1, T Donlon 0–1.	Referee: P Egan (Leitrim)

21 June 1981 Semi-final	Mayo	2–8 – 1–9	Galway	McHale Park, Castlebar
	J Bourke 1–1, J Lyons 1–0, M Carney 0–3, G Feeney 0–1, T Reilly 0–1, J McGrath 0–1, J Maughan 0–1.		S Joyce 1–1, V Daly 0–2, G McManus 0–2, B Brennan 0–1, B Talty 0–1, B Joyce 0–1, TJ Gilmore 0–1.	Attendance: 20,000; Referee: T. Moran (Leitrim)

Final

12 July 1981 Final	Mayo	0–12 – 0–4	Sligo	McHale Park, Castlebar
	M Carney 0–5, WJ padden 0–2, J Maughan 0–1, J Bourke 0–1, J McGrath 0–1, T O'Malley 0–1, M O'Toole 0–1.		John Kent 0–2, P Henry 0–1, E McHale 0–1.	Referee: T Cunningham (Galway)

=== Leinster Senior Football Championship ===
First round

10 May 1981 First round	Longford	1–10 – 3–10	Westmeath	Pearse Park, Longford
	B Smith 0–5, M Casey 1–0, T Sheridan 0–3, J McCormack 0–1, L Tierney 0–1.		W Lowry 0–4, E Coughlan 1–0, S Hannratty 1–0, M Behan 1–0, T McCormack 0–3, F Tone 0–2, E Tynan 0–1.	Attendance: 3,000; Referee: P Kavanagh (Meath)

10 May 1981 First round	Kilkenny	2–4 – 2–11	Wexford	Nowlan Park, Kilkenny
	S Fennelly 1–1, P Lannon 1–1, J O'Donnell 0–1, J Walsh 0–1.		G Howlin 2–0, E Mann 0–6, T Wright 0–3, G Byrne 0–1, J Wright 0–1.	Referee: C Lally (Laois)

10 May 1981 First round	Wicklow	3–11 – 1–8	Carlow	Geraldine Park, Athy
	T Murphy 1–3, J Lynch 1–3, D Foley 1–0, P Burke 0–3, P O'Byrne 0–1, P Baker 0–1.		W Cullen 1–3, N Bambrick 0–2, D O'Connor 0–1, C Ware 0–1, M Doyle 0–1.	Referee: S Aldridge (Kildare)

17 May 1981 First round	Laois	5–8 – 3–8	Louth	Croke Park, Dublin
	E Whelan 2–2, W Brennan 1–4, D O'Loughlin 1–2, T Prendergast 1–0.		K Dawe 2–4, M McDermott 1–1, E Judge 0–1, G O'Callaghan 0–1, Jim McDonnell 0–1.	Attendance: 3,755; Referee: A Jordan (Dublin)

Quarter-finals

31 May 1981 Quarter-final	Dublin	0–10 – 0–8	Wicklow	St. Conleth's Park, Newbridge
	J McCarthy 0–4, A McCaul 0–4, K Duff 0–1, PJ Buckley 0–1.		P Baker 0–3, P O'Byrne 0–2, T Murphy 0–2, J Lynch 0–1.	Attendance: 11,000; Referee: J Gunning (Offaly)

31 May 1981 Quarter-final	Westmeath	1–9 – 1–14	Offaly	Cusack Park, Mullingar
	F Tone 1–4, S Hannratty 0–1, T Collins 0–1, E Tynan 0–1, W Lowry 0–1.		M Connor 0–9, B Lowry 1–2, S Lowry 0–1, J Moran 0–1, M Wright 0–1.	Attendance: 7000; Referee: K Campbell (Meath)

7 June 1981 Quarter-final	Wexford	2–9 – 1–11	Meath	Croke Park, Dublin
	E Mahon 0–6, J Wright 1–0, G Howlin 1–0, G O'Connor 0–3.		E Barry 0–6, L Smith 1–1, C O'Rourke 0–3, F O'Sullivan 0–1.	Referee: D Guerin (Dublin)

14 June 1981 Quarter-final	Laois	3–13 – 1–9	Kildare	O'Connor Park, Tullamore
	T Prendergast 3–3, W Brennan 0–5, E Whelan 0–3, M Moore 0–2.		G Power 1–4, T Shaw 0–2, L Tompkins 0–2, M Condon 0–1.	Referee: P Collins (Westmeath)

Semi-finals

28 June 1981 Semi-final	Offaly	1–16 – 0–14	Wexford	Croke Park, Dublin
	M Connor 1–5, B Lowry 0–4, G Carroll 0–3, J Mooney 0–2, M Wright 0–1, T Connor 0–1.		E Mahon 0–8, G Howlin 0–2, G O'Connor 0–2, G Byrne 0–1, S Fitzhenry 0–1.	Attendance: 7,000; Referee: C Lally (Laois)

5 July 1981 Semi-final	Dublin	0–11 – 2–9	Laois	O'Connor Park, Tullamore
	A McCaul 0–8, J Thompson 0–2, J Ronayne 0–1.		T Prendergast 1–1, J Costello 1–0, W Brennan 0–3, E Whelan 0–2, D O'Loughlin 0–1, G Brown 0–1, M Moore 0–1.	Attendance: 25,000; Referee: P Kavanagh (Meath)

Final

26 July 1981 Final	Offaly	1–18 – 3–9	Laois	Croke Park, Dublin
	Brendan Lowry 1–4, Matt Connor 0–5 (0-3f), Tomas O'Connor, Pat Fitzgerald, Gerry Carroll, Sean Lowry 0–2 each, Aidan O'Halloran 0–1		Willie Brennan 1–3 (0-2f), Mick Moore 1–2, Tom Prendergast 1–1, John Costello, Eamon Whelan, Declan O'Loughlin 0–1 each	Attendance: 28,398; Referee: Paddy Collins (Westmeath)

=== Munster Senior Football Championship ===
Quarter-finals

31 May 1981 Quarter-final	Tipperary	0–9 – 3–14	Clare	Gaelic Grounds, Limerick
	B Kennedy 0–2, B Conway 0–2, M O'Riordan 0–2, H Mulhaire 0–1, G McGrath 0–1, J Dunne 0–1.		G Fitzpatrick 1–4, T Tubridy 1–4, M O'Reilly 1–2, P Burke 0–2, N Normoyle 0–1, M Murray 0–1.	Referee: W Fogarty (Kerry)

31 May 1981 Quarter-final	Limerick	0–10 – 0–10	Waterford	Gaelic Grounds, Limerick
	A Moran 0–3, K Hanley 0–2, T Cummins 0–2, M Quish 0–1, F Ryan 0–1, D Fitzgerald 0–1.		P White 0–4, M Horgan 0–2, R Dunford 0–1, M Hackett 0–1, T Keating 0–1, J Power 0–1.

14 June 1981 Quarter-final replay	Waterford	0–10 – 1–4	Limerick	Fraher Field, Dungarvan
	T Casey 0–5, P White 0–3, J Kelly 0–1, T Keating 0–1.		T Cummins 1–0, A Moran 0–2, D Kiely 0–1, K Hanley 0–1.	Referee: M Griffin (Clare)

Semi-finals

28 June 1981 Semi-final	Kerry	4–17 – 0–6	Clare	Frank Sheehy Park, Listowel
	E Liston 3–3, M Sheehy 0–6, J Egan 1–1, P Spillane 0–3, P Ó Sé 0–1, J O'Shea 0–1, T Spillane 0–1, O Moran 0–1.		G Fitzpatrick 0–2, P McNamara 0–2, N Roche 0–1, J McGrath 0–1.	Referee: P Lane (Limerick)

28 June 1981 Semi-final	Waterford	0–7 – 2–18	Cork	Fraher Field, Dungarvan
	P White 0–3, M Kavanagh 0–2, T Casey 0–2.		D Allen 0–7, J Allen 1–2, D Barron 1–0, T Dalton 0–3, F O'Mahony 0–2, C Ryan 0–1, B Lotty 0–1, D Barry 0–1, S Hayes 0–1.	Referee: W Fogarty (Kerry)

Final

19 July 1981 Final	Kerry	1–11 – 0–3	Cork	Fitzgerald Stadium, Killarney
	Mikey Sheehy 1–5 (0-2f), Pat Spillane 0–3, Jack O'Shea, Eoin Liston, John Egan 0–1 each		Tom Creedon (0-1f), Dave Barry, Dinny Allen (0-1f) 0–1 each	Attendance: 41,292; Referee: Paddy Collins (Westmeath)

=== Ulster Senior Football Championship ===
Preliminary round

17 May 1981 Preliminary round	Monaghan	2–9 – 0–6	Tyrone	St. Mary's Park, Castleblayney
	E McEneaney 1–7, S McAleer 1–1, K Treanor 0–1.		B Donnelly 0–2, P Ball 0–2, J Devlin 0–1, E McKenna 0–1.	Referee: S McManus (Fermanagh)

Quarter-finals

24 May 1981 Quarter-final	Antrim	2–13 – 2–12	Cavan	Casement Park, Belfast
	J Herron 1–4, K Gough 1–1, A McQuillan 0–4, D Maguire 0–3, S McGourdy 0–1.		D Donohoe 2–5, M Reilly 0–1, C O'Keeffe 0–1, M Faulkner 0–1.	Referee: S Murray (Monaghan)

31 May 1981 Quarter-final	Armagh	2–16 – 0–13	Donegal	Athletic Grounds, Armagh
	B Hughes 1–1, N Marley 1–1, P Loughran 0–3, J Kernan 0–2, P Rafferty 0–2, J Loughran 0–2, C McKinstry 0–1, J Donnelly 0–1.		M McHugh 0–4, S Reilly 0–3, S Bonnar 0–2, M Gallagher 0–1, C Mulgrew 0–1, S Flynn 0–1, M Carr 0–1.	Referee: J Heaney (Tyrone)

7 June 1981 Quarter-final	Derry	0–12 – 0–10	Fermanagh	Dean McGlinchey Park, Ballinascreen
	B Kelly 0–4, M Feeley 0–4, J McGrourty 0–2, T Doherty 0–1, J McAree 0–1.		P McGinnitty 0–4, G McEvoy 0–3, E McPartland 0–1, P Connolly 0–1, P Courtney 0–1.	Referee: S Gallagher (Donegal)

14 June 1981 Quarter-final	Down	0–10 – 0–10	Monaghan	Pairc Esler, Newry
	B McGovern 0–7, N Toner 0–1, L Austin 0–1, D Morgan 0–1.		E McEneaney 0–6, S McAleer 0–2, D Mulligan 0–1, T Moyna 0–1.	Referee: J Gough (Antrim)

28 June 1981 Quarter-final replay	Monaghan	1–9 – 3–4	Down	St. Mary's Park, Castleblayney
	K Treanor 1–1, E McEneaney 0–4. G McCarville 0–2, K Finlay 0–1, H Clerkin 0–1.		B McGovern 1–0, D Morgan 1–0, J McCartan 1–0, L Austin 0–1, P O'Rourke 0–1, N Toner 0–1, A McGranaghan 0–1.	Referee: J Gough (Antrim)

Semi-finals

21 June 1981 Semi-final	Armagh	4–7 – 1–3	Antrim	St. Mary's Park, Castleblayney
	P Rafferty 1–2, S Devlin 1–0, J Kernan 1–0, C McKinstrey 1–0, B Hughes 0–2, P LOughlin 0–2, J Loughran 0–1.		PJ O'Gara 1–0, D Maguire 0–2, K Gough 0–1.	Referee: S Murray (Monaghan)

5 July 1981 Semi-final	Down	0–12 – 0–9	Derry	St. Tiernach's Park, Clones
	B McGovern 0–5, G Blaney 0–2, N Toner 0–2, J McCartan 0–2, A Rogers 0–1.		J McAfee 0–3, B Kelly 0–2, J McGrourty 0–1, T Doherty 0–1, M Lynch 0–1, M McFeeley 0–1.	Referee: S McManus (Fermanagh)

Final

19 July 1981 Final	Down	3–12 – 1–10	Armagh	St. Tiernach's Park, Clones
	A Rodgers 0–4, G Blaney 1–0, N King 0–1, B McCartan 0–1.		P Loughran 0–5, B Hughes 1–1, C McKinstrey 0–2, P Moriarty 0–1, P Rafferty 0–1.	Attendance: 25,000; Referee: J Heaney (Tyrone)

=== All-Ireland Senior Football Championship ===
Semi-finals

9 August 1981 Semi-final	Mayo	1–6 – 2–19	Kerry	Croke Park, Dublin
	E McHale 1–0, J McGrath 0–2, J Lyons 0–1, A Garvey 0–1, M Carney 0–1, J Lyons 0–1.		M Sheehy 0–6, E Liston 1–2, G Power 1–0, D Moran 0–3, J Egan 0–3, P Spillane 0–3, J O'Shea 0–1, T Doyle 0–1.	Attendance: 24,631; Referee: P Collins (Westmeath)

23 August 1981 Semi-final	Down	0–6 – 0–12	Offaly	Croke Park, Dublin
	G Blaney 0–3, Jim McCartan 0–1, N King 0–1, B Toner 0–1.		M Connor 0–7, B Lowry 0–2, M Lowry 0–1, G Carroll 0–1, A O'Halloran 0–1.	Attendance: 35,406; Referee: W Fogarty (Kerry)

Final

20 September 1981 Final	Kerry	1–12 – 0–8	Offaly	Croke Park, Dublin
	M Sheehy 0–5, J O'Shea 1–0, D Moran 0–2, T Doyle 0–1, J Egan 0–1, P Ó Sé 0–1, S Walsh 0–1, G Power 0–1.		M Connor 0–4, S Lowry 0–2, T O'Connor 0–1, B Lowry 0–1.	Attendance: 65,898; Referee: P Collins (Westmeath)

== Championship statistics ==
=== Top scorers ===
Overall

Rank	Player	County	Tally	Total	Matches	Average
1	Matt Connor	Offaly	1–31	34	5	6.80
2	Mikey Sheehy	Kerry	1–22	25	4	6.25
3	Tom Prendergast	Laois	6–5	23	4	5.75
4	Eamonn McEneaney	Monaghan	1–17	20	3	6.66
5	Eoin Liston	Kerry	4–6	18	4	4.50

Single game

Rank	Player	County	Tally	Total	Opposition
1	Tom Prendergast	Laois	3–3	12	Kildare
1	Eoin Liston	Kerry	3–3	12	Clare
3	Donal Donohoe	Cavan	2–5	11	Antrim
3	Gay McManus	Galway	0–11	11	Leitrim
5	Kevin Dawe	Louth	2–4	10	Laois
5	Eamonn McEneaney	Monaghan	1–7	10	Tyrone
7	Matt Connor	Offaly	0–9	9	Westmeath
8	Eamonn Whelan	Laois	2–2	8	Louth
8	Matt Connor	Offaly	1–5	8	Wexford
8	Mikey Sheehy	Kerry	1–5	8	Cork
8	Eddie Mahon	Wexford	0–8	8	Offaly
8	Anto McCaul	Dublin	0–8	8	Laois

=== Miscellaneous ===
- London after six years in the Connacht championship play their games this year on home ground at Ruislip.
- Mayo won their first Connacht title since 1969.
- Armagh vs Down Ulster final the only 1 (1961-1999).
- Kerry become the third team in the history of the championship to win four All-Ireland titles in-a-row. They equalled the record set by Wexford (1915–1918) and Kerry (1929–1932). Lasted until Dublin winning six in a row (2015–2020).
