= Eugene McGee (sports administrator) =

Irish Gaelic footballer and manager (1941–2019)

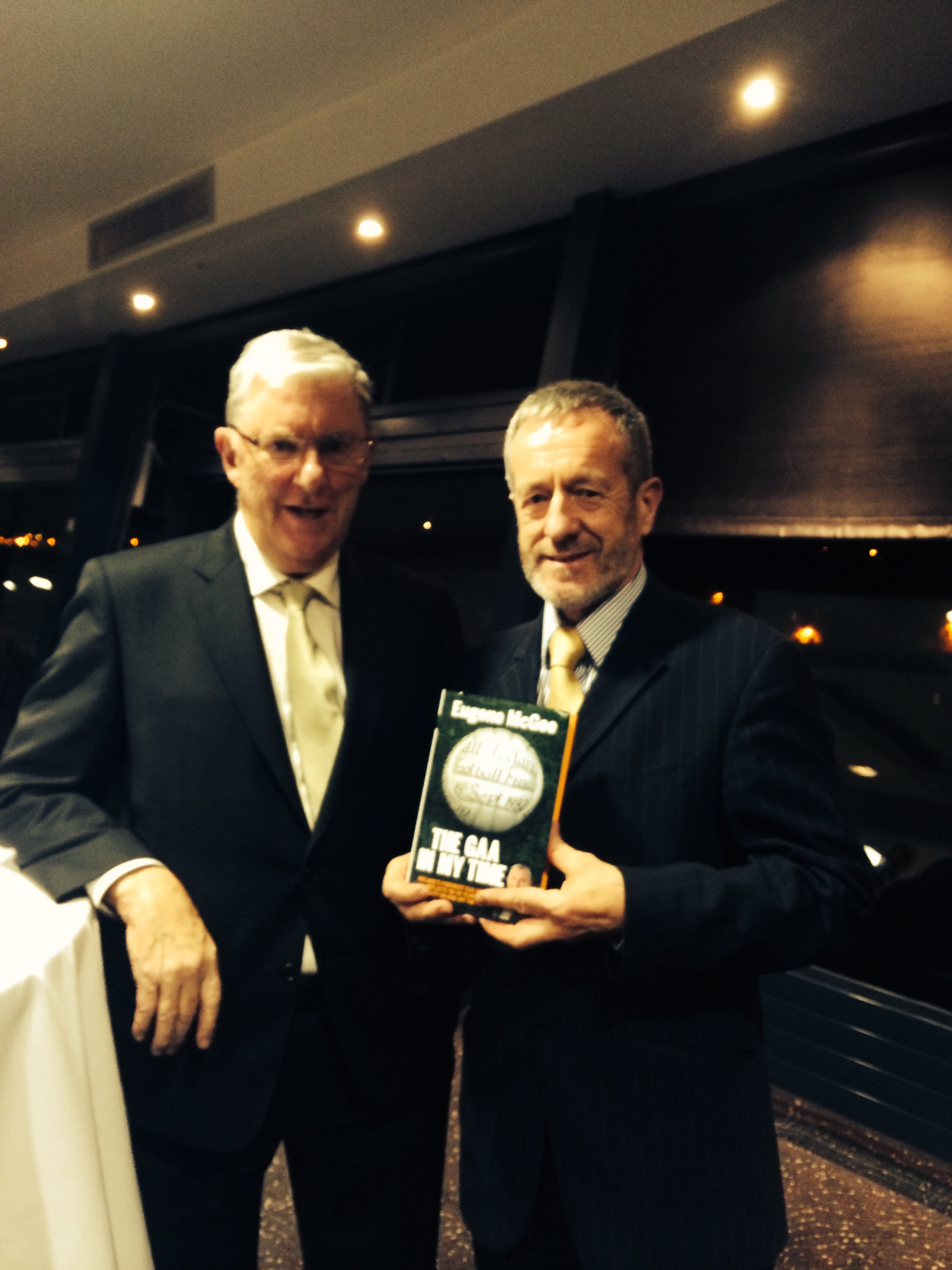
- Left, with Seán Kelly on the right

Personal information
- Native name: Eoghan Mag Aoidh (Irish)
- Born: 16 November 1941 Aughnacliffe, County Longford, Ireland
- Died: 5 May 2019 (aged 77) Longford, County Longford, Ireland
- Occupation: Managing editor

Sport
- Sport: Gaelic football
Club management
- Years: Club
- University College Dublin; Newtowncashel
	2; 1	2; 0	2; 0
Inter-county management
- Years: Team
- 1976–1984 1984–1988: Offaly; Cavan
Inter-county titles as manager
County	League	Province	All-Ireland
Offaly	1	3	3

Eugene McGee (16 November 1941 – 5 May 2019) was an Irish Gaelic footballer, manager, trainer, selector, Gaelic games administrator and journalist, who is best known for his time as manager of the Offaly senior football team. McGee guided the Offaly team to success in the 1980, 1981, and 1982 Leinster Senior Football Championship, and to the 1982 All-Ireland Senior Football Championship title.

McGee was in charge of Ireland when they toured Australia for the 1990 International Rules Series. He was also in charge for the 1987 International Rules Series and Seán McCague was his assistant manager on both occasions.

In 2004, McGee was intermediary in a dispute between Offaly's International Rules Series player Ciaran McManus and the Offaly County Board when McManus questioned the selection of a new manager.

McGee chaired the Football Review Committee (FRC) during Liam O'Neill's GAA presidency that led to adjustments to the game such as the introduction of a black card.

He wrote for the Longford Leader, The Irish Press, The Sunday Press, Sunday Tribune and Irish Independent.

Seán Lowry described him as "a stern man".

McGee was interviewed for the documentary Players of the Faithful, which RTÉ One showed less than six months before his death.

== Honours ==
University College Dublin

- All-Ireland Senior Club Football Championship (2): 1974, 1975
- Leinster Senior Club Football Championship (2): 1973, 1974
- Dublin Senior Football Championship (2): 1973, 1974
- Sigerson Cup (7): 1968, 1973, 1974, 1975, 1977, 1978, 1979

Newtowncashel

- Longford Senior Football Championship (1): 1977

Offaly

- All-Ireland Senior Football Championship (1): 1982
- Leinster Senior Football Championship (3): 1980, 1981, 1982
- Leinster Under-21 Football Championship (2): 1977, 1979

Cavan

- Dr McKenna Cup (1): 1988

Achievements
Preceded by Mick O'Dwyer	All-Ireland SFC winning manager 1982	Succeeded by Kevin Heffernan
