= Charlie Nelligan =

Kerry Gaelic footballer (born 1957)

Personal information
- Native name: Cathal Ó Neileagáin (Irish)
- Born: 26 February 1957 (age 69) Castleisland, County Kerry, Ireland
- Height: 5 ft 10 in (178 cm)

Sport
- Sport: Gaelic football
- Position: Goalkeeper
Club
- Years: Club
- 1970s–1990s: Castleisland Desmonds
Club titles
- Kerry titles: 7/8
- Munster titles: 2
- All-Ireland Titles: 1
Inter-county
Years	County	Apps (scores)
1976–1991	Kerry	49 (0-00)
Inter-county titles
- Munster titles: 9
- All-Irelands: 7
- NFL: 3
- All Stars: 2

Charlie Nelligan (born 26 February 1957 in Castleisland, County Kerry) is an Irish former sportsperson. He played Gaelic football with his local club Castleisland Desmonds and at senior level for the Kerry county team between 1974 and 1991. He also played association football with Home Farm in Dublin and with the Irish amateur team.

== Playing career ==
=== Club ===
Nelligan played for his local Castleisland Desmonds club. He won a number of county club championship titles with Castleisland throughout the 1980s and 1990s. These victories allowed the club to represent the county in the provincial club championship. A 2–6 to 0–9 defeat of the St Finbarr's club gave Nelligan a Munster club winners' medal. He later lined out in Croke Park for the All-Ireland final against St Vincents of Dublin. In one of the most dramatic endings ever a fifty-eighth-minute goal gave Castleisland a 2–2 to 0–7 victory. The win gave Nelligan an All-Ireland club winners' medal.

Nelligan collected a second consecutive Munster club winners' medal in 1985 as St Finbarr's were defeated for a second consecutive year. Castleisland later qualified for another All-Ireland final. This time Burren provided the opposition and the game was another close affair. A second-half goal secured the title for Burran as Nelligan's side were defeated by 1–10 to 1–6.

He also played hurling with St Patrick's and won a Kerry Intermediate Hurling Championship with them in 1983.

=== Minor and under-21 ===
Nelli first came to prominence on the inter-county scene in the 1970s as goalkeeper on the Kerry minor football team. He won a Munster title at this level in 1975 following a 3–7 to 1–11 defeat of Cork. Kerry later qualified for the All-Ireland final, with Tyrone providing the opposition. Kerry had an easy 1–10 to 0–4 win on that occasion, giving Nelligan an All-Ireland winners' medal.

That same year Nelligan was also the goalkeeper on the Kerry under-21 football team. He captured a Munster title in that grade that same year following a nine-point trouncing of Waterford. Nelligan's side later qualified for the All-Ireland final with Dublin providing the opposition. A 1–15 to 0–10 score line gave Kerry the victory and gave Nelligan an All-Ireland under-21 winners' medal.

In 1976 Nelligan made it two Munster under-21 titles in-a-row as Kerry retained their provincial crown at the expense of Cork. He later lined out in a second All-Ireland final. Kildare provided the oppsoution on that occasion; however, they were no match for Kerry. Nelligan collected a second All-Ireland winners' medal following a 0–14 to 1–3 victory.

Nelligan captured a third provincial under-21 title in 1977 following a two-goal defeat of Cork. Kerry later qualified for a third consecutive All-Ireland final with Down providing the opposition. A 1–11 to 1–5 score line gave Kerry the victory and gave Nelligan a third All-Ireland under-21 winners' medal.

In 1978 Nelligan made it four-in-a-row in Munster as Kerry retained their under-21 provincial crown at the expense of Cork again. He later lined out in a fourth consecutive All-Ireland final. Roscommon provided the opposition on that occasion; however, a close game developed. At the final whistle Kerry were defeated narrowly by 1–9 to 1–8.

=== Senior ===
Nelligan made his senior inter-county debut with Kerry in the 1976 All-Ireland final. He came on as a substitute as both sides were hoping for success; however, new 'Dub' Kevin Moran was causing havoc with the Kerry defence. Jimmy Keaveney converted a penalty to help Dublin to a 3–8 to 0–10 victory and defeat for Kerry.

Two years later in 1978 Nelligan became the first-choice goalkeeper as Kerry faced little competition in the provincial championship once again. A defeat of Cork gave Liston a Munster winners'. Kerry later qualified for a third All-Ireland final in four years, with Nelligan playing in his second championship decider. Old rivals Dublin provided the opposition; however, the game turned into a rout. The game is chiefly remembered for Mikey Sheehy's sensational goal. The Kerry forward lobbed the ball over the head of Paddy Cullen, who was caught off his line arguing with the referee. Eoin Liston announced his arrival on the inter-county scene and scored a hat-trick of goals. Pat Spillane played all over the field, including goalkeeper after Nelligan was sent off. At the full-time whistle Kerry were the winners by 5–11 to 0–9.

In 1979 Kerry made it five-in-a-row in Munster as Cork fell by ten points in the provincial final. It was Nelligan's second Munster title. He later went in search of a second consecutive All-Ireland medal. Dublin provided the opposition for the fifth consecutive occasion. Kerry were handicapped throughout the game. Ger Power did not start the game, while John O'Keeffe got injured and Páidí Ó Sé was sent off during the encounter. Two goals by Mikey Sheehy and a third by John Egan helped 'the Kingdom' to a 3–13 to 1–8 victory. It was Nelligan's second All-Ireland winners' medal.

Kerry's dominance continued in 1980. Another defeat of Cork in the provincial final gave Nelligan a third Munster winners' medal in succession. Another All-Ireland final appearance beckoned; this time with Roscommon providing the opposition. The Connacht champions shocked Kerry and took a five-point lead inside the first twelve minutes. Mikey Sheehy popped up again to score the decisive goal, as Kerry went on to claim a 1–9 to 1–6 victory in a game that contained sixty-four frees. The victory gave Kerry and Nelligan a third All-Ireland title in succession.

In 1981 Nelligan won his fourth consecutive Munster title, before lining out in the All-Ireland final against Offaly. Kerry had an easy win with seven players combining for a great goal. He captured his fourth All-Ireland winners' medal that day as Kerry won by 1–12 to 0–8.

In 1982 Nelligan won his second National League medal before Kerry secured an eighth consecutive Munster final victory over Cork, giving him a fifth provincial winners' medal. The All-Ireland final pitted 'the Kingdom' against Offaly for the second year in-a-row. Kerry had the upper hand for much of the game and were leading by two points with two minutes left to be played. The game, however, was not over as Offaly substitute Séamus Darby, who had entered the game almost unnoticed, produced the most spectacular of finishes by scoring a late goal. Kerry failed to score again to level the match and Offaly went on to win their third All-Ireland title ever. Kerry's five-in-a-row dream was shattered.

Kerry missed out on an historic nine-in-a-row in Munster in 1983, as Cork finally triumphed. 'The Kingdom' bounced back the following year with Nelligan winning his third National League medal and his sixth Munster title. The centenary-year All-Ireland final pitted Kerry against old rivals and reigning champions Dublin. 'The Kingdom' dominated the game from start to finish. Only two Dublin forwards scored as Kerry ran out easy winners by 0–14 to 1–6. It was Nelligan's fifth All-Ireland winners' medal.

Kerry made no mistake again in 1985. A two-goal victory over Cork gave Nelligan a seventh Munster winners' medal. Another All-Ireland final beckoned, with Dublin providing the opposition for a second consecutive year. Jack O'Shea scored a key goal after eleven minutes and Kerry stormed to a nine-point lead at half-time. 'The Dubs' came storming back with Joe McNally scoring two goals. The gap could not be bridged and Kerry won by 2–1 to 2–8. The victory gave Nelligan an impressive sixth All-Ireland winners' medal.

In 1986 Kerry's dominance showed no sign of disappearing. Cork fell again in the provincial final, giving Nelligan an eighth Munster title. An eighth All-Ireland final appearance quickly followed and it turned out to be an historic occasion. Tyrone provided the opposition in their first-ever championship decider. A Peter Quinn goal gave the Ulster men a six-point lead in the second-half; however, the game was far from over. Pat Spillane ran fifty yards up the field for a hand-passed goal to get Kerry back on track. Mikey Sheehy scored a second goal to give 'the Kingdom' a 2–15 to 1–10 victory. It was Nelligan's seventh All-Ireland winners' medal.

Cork ended Kerry's run by capturing the next four Munster titles. Nelligan continued to play with Kerry, winning his ninth Munster title in 1991. Kerry were subsequently defeated by eventual champions Down in the All-Ireland semi-final and Nelligan decided to retire from inter-county football.

=== Inter-provincial ===
Nelligan also lined out with Munster in the inter-provincial football competition. He first lined out with his province in 1979; however, Munster were defeated on that occasion. Nelligan's side lost out again in 1980; however, in 1981 he won his first Railway Cup winners' medal as Connacht were accounted for. It was the first of two titles in-a-row for Munster and for Liston. He lined out in the next three inter-provincial campaigns also; however, Munster were defeated on all three occasions. Nelligan lined out for Munster again in 1989; however, defeat was his lot.
