= Ger O'Keeffe =

Irish hurler and Gaelic footballer

Gerard O'Keeffe
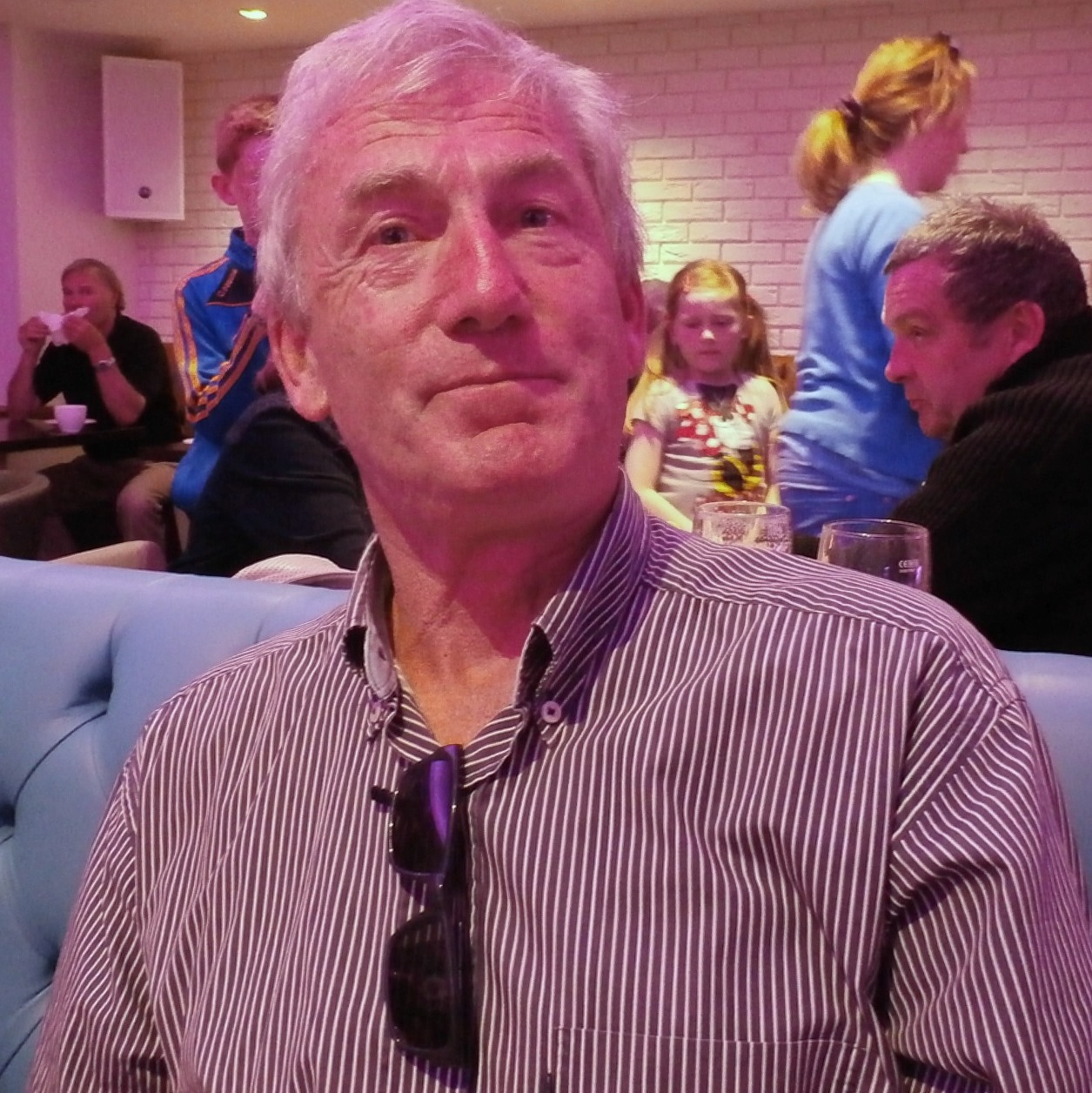
- O'Keeffe at Sea Lodge Hotel, Waterville

Personal information
- Native name: Gearóid Ó Cuív (Irish)

Sport
- Sport: Gaelic football
- Position: Half-back
Club
- Years: Club
- 1970s-1992: Austin Stack's
Club titles
- Kerry titles: 5
- Munster titles: 1
- All-Ireland Titles: 1
Inter-county
Years	County	Apps (scores)
1973-1982	Kerry	28 (0-01)
Inter-county titles
- Munster titles: 5
- All-Irelands: 3
- NFL: 4
- All Stars: 1

Ger O'Keeffe is an Irish former Gaelic footballer who played for Austin Stack's and at senior level for the Kerry county team between 1973 and 1982.

He is currently a selector with the Kerry senior football team.

== Playing career ==
=== Schools ===
O'Keeffe was part of the St Brendan's College, Killarney side that won the Munster Colleges Corn Uí Mhuirí and Hogan Cup in 1969.

=== Underage ===
In 1970 O'Keeffe was part of the Kerry minor team that won the Munster Minor Football Championship after beating Cork in the final. Kerry later qualified for the All-Ireland Minor Football Championship, where they lost out to Galway after a replay.

=== Senior ===
O'Keeffe was Kerry captain in 1977 when Kerry lost to Dublin.

He was a member of the Kerry four-in-a-row All-Ireland SFC team from 1978 to 1981.

== Selector ==
O'Keeffe was a selector of the senior Kerry team from 2004 to 2006 and again from 2009 until the present. He was also a selector with Jack O'Connor for the Kerry U21 team in 2002 and 2008. He won an All-Ireland Under 21 medal in 1973 and won an All-Ireland Club SFC title with Austin Stacks in 1977.

Sporting positions
Preceded by John O'Keeffe	Kerry Senior Football Captain; 1977	Succeeded by Denis 'Ogie' Moran
