= Eoin Liston =

Kerry Gaelic footballer (born 1957)

Eoin 'Bomber' Liston
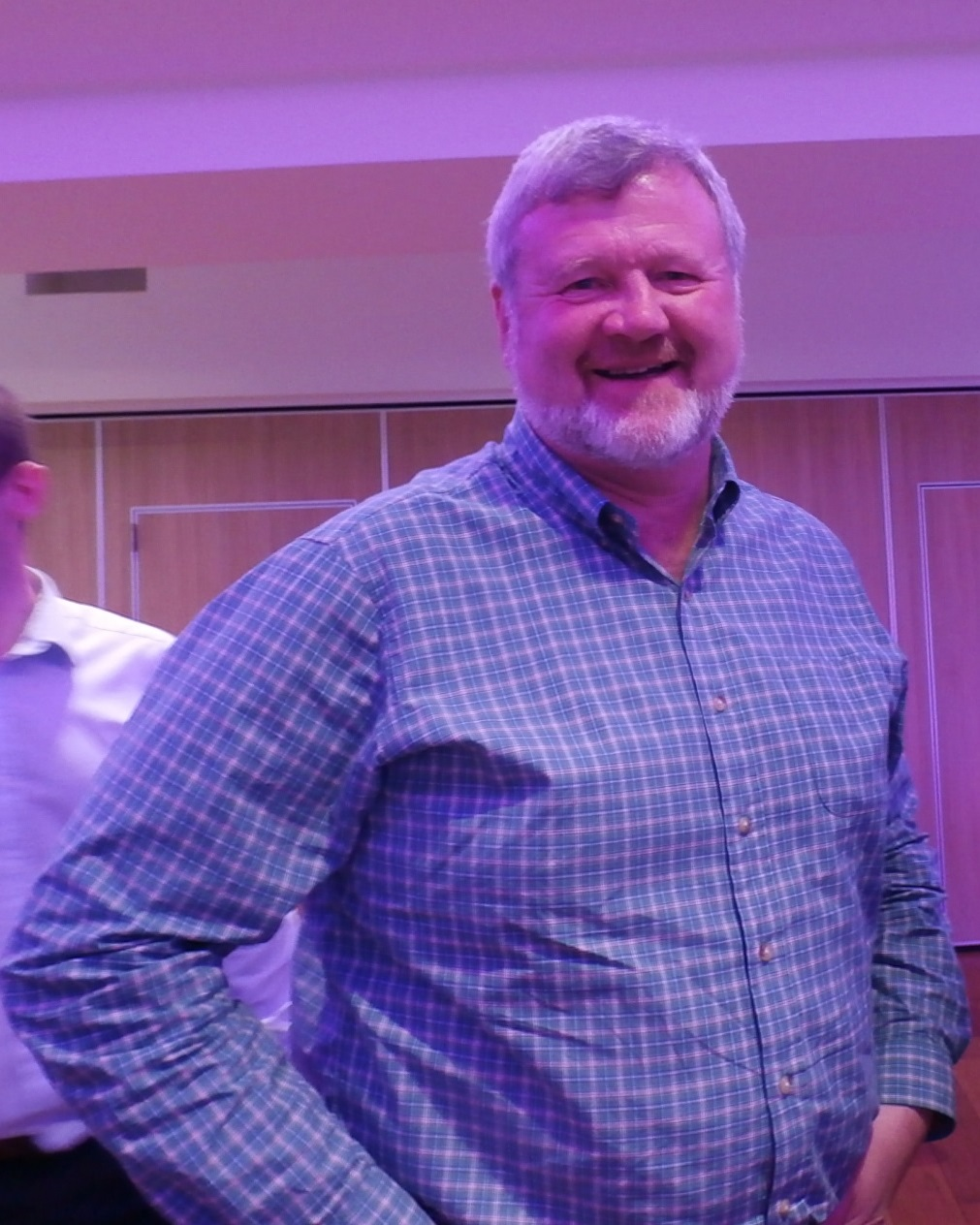

Personal information
- Native name: Eoin Liostún (Irish)
- Nickname: Bomber
- Born: 16 October 1957 (age 69) Ballybunion, County Kerry, Ireland
- Height: 6 ft 3 in (191 cm)

Sport
- Sport: Gaelic football
- Position: Full-forward
Club
- Years: Club
- 1970s–1990s: Beale
Club titles
- Kerry titles: 1
Inter-county
Years	County	Apps (scores)
1978–1993	Kerry	39 (20–50)
Inter-county titles
- Munster titles: 9
- All-Irelands: 7
- NFL: 2
- All Stars: 4

Eoin "Bomber" Liston (born 16 October 1957 in Ballybunion, County Kerry) is an Irish former sportsperson. He played Gaelic football with his local club Beale, his divisional side Shannon Rangers and at senior level for the Kerry county team between 1978 and 1993. Liston is regarded as one of the greatest full-forwards in the history of the game.

== Playing career ==
=== Club ===
Liston played his club football with his local club called Beale. He lined out in the county championship with Shannon Rangers. In 1977 he was a member of the side that defeated Feale Rangers to take the county senior championship title. It was Liston's only victory in the county championship.

=== Minor and under-21 ===
He never played minor football for Kerry.

By the late 1970s, Liston had joined the Kerry under-21 football team. He captured a Munster title in this grade in 1977 following a two-goal defeat of Cork. Liston's side later qualified for the All-Ireland final with Down providing the opposition. A 1–11 to 1–5 scoreline gave Kerry the victory and gave Liston an All-Ireland winners' medal.

In 1978 Liston made it two Munster under-21 titles in a row as Kerry retained their provincial crown at the expense of Cork. He later lined out in a second All-Ireland final. Roscommon provided the opposition on that occasion; however, a close game developed. At the final whistle, Kerry were defeated by 1–9 to 1–8.

=== Senior ===
Liston made his senior inter-county debut with Kerry in 1978, and it proved to be a successful year. Kerry faced little competition in the provincial championship once again. A defeat of Cork gave Liston a Munster winners'. Kerry later qualified for a third All-Ireland final in four years, with Liston playing at full-forward in his first championship decider. Old rivals Dublin provided the opposition; however, the game turned into a rout. The game is chiefly remembered for Mikey Sheehy's sensational goal. The Kerry forward lobbed the ball over the head of Paddy Cullen, who was caught off his line arguing with the referee. Liston announced his arrival on the inter-county scene and scored a hat-trick of goals. Pat Spillane played all over the field, including goalkeeper after Charlie Nelligan was sent off. At the full-time whistle Kerry were the winners by 5–11 to 0–9.

In 1979 Kerry made it five-in-a-row in Munster as Cork fell by ten points in the provincial final. It was Liston's second Munster title. He later went in search of a second consecutive All-Ireland medal. Dublin provided the opposition for the fifth consecutive occasion. Kerry were handicapped throughout the game. Ger Power did not start the game, while John O'Keeffe got injured and Páidí Ó Sé was sent off during the encounter. Two goals by Mikey Sheehy and a third by John Egan helped 'the Kingdom' to a 3–13 to 1–8 victory. It was Liston's second All-Ireland winners' medal.

Kerry's dominance continued in 1980. Another defeat of Cork in the provincial final gave Liston a third Munster winners' medal in succession. Another All-Ireland final appearance beckoned, this time with Roscommon providing the opposition. The Connacht champions shocked Kerry and took a five-point lead inside the first twelve minutes. Mikey Sheehy popped up again to score the decisive goal, as Kerry went on to claim a 1–9 to 1–6 victory in a game that contained sixty-four frees. The victory gave Kerry and Liston a third All-Ireland title in succession.

In 1981 Liston won his fourth consecutive Munster title, before lining out in the All-Ireland final against Offaly. Kerry had an easy win with seven players combining for a great goal. He captured his fourth All-Ireland winners' medal that day as Kerry won by 1–12 to 0–8.

In 1982 Liston won his first National Football League medal before Kerry secured an eighth consecutive Munster final victory over Cork, giving him a fifth provincial winners' medal. The All-Ireland final pitted 'the Kingdom' against Offaly for the second year in-a-row. Kerry had the upper hand for much of the game and were leading by two points with two minutes left to be played. The game, however, was not over as Offaly substitute Séamus Darby, who had entered the game almost unnoticed, produced the most spectacular of finishes by scoring a late goal. Kerry failed to score again to level the match and Offaly went on to win their third All-Ireland title ever. Kerry's five-in-a-row dream was shattered.

Kerry missed out on a historic nine-in-a-row in Munster in 1983, as Cork finally triumphed. 'The Kingdom' bounced back the following year with Liston winning his second National League medal and his sixth Munster title. The centenary-year All-Ireland final pitted Kerry against old rivals and reigning champions Dublin. 'The Kingdom' dominated the game from start to finish. Only two Dublin forwards scored as Kerry ran out easy winners by 0–14 to 1–6. It was Liston's fifth All-Ireland winners' medal.

Kerry made no mistake again in 1985. A two-goal victory over Cork gave Liston a seventh Munster winners' medal. Another All-Ireland final beckoned, with Dublin providing the opposition for a second consecutive year. Jack O'Shea scored a key goal after eleven minutes and Kerry stormed to a nine-point lead at half-time. 'The Dubs' came storming back with Joe McNally scoring two goals. The gap could not be bridged and Kerry won by 2–1 to 2–8. The victory gave Liston an impressive sixth All-Ireland winners' medal.

In 1986 Kerry's dominance showed no sign of disappearing. Cork fell again in the provincial final, giving Liston an eighth Munster title. An eighth All-Ireland final appearance quickly followed and it turned out to be a historic occasion. Tyrone provided the opposition in their first-ever championship decider. A Peter Quinn goal gave the Ulster men a six-point lead in the second half; however, the game was far from over. Spillane ran fifty yards up the field for a hand-passed goal to get Kerry back on track. Mikey Sheehy scored a second goal to give 'the Kingdom' a 2–15 to 1–10 victory. It was Liston's seventh All-Ireland medal.

Cork ended Kerry's run by capturing the next four Munster titles. Liston retired from inter-county activity; however, he was recalled to the squad in 1993. It was an unsuccessful year for Kerry and Liston entered into permanent retirement following Kerry's exit from the championship.

=== Inter-provincial ===
Liston also lined out with Munster in the inter-provincial football competition. He first lined out with his province in 1979; however, Munster were defeated on that occasion. Liston's side lost out again in 1980; however, in 1981 he won his first Railway Cup winners' medal as Connacht were accounted for. It was the first of two titles in a row for Munster and for Liston. He lined out in the next three inter-provincial campaigns also; however, Munster were defeated on all three occasions.

== Managerial career ==
In retirement from playing Liston became involved in team management. In 2002 he guided Kerins O'Rahilly's to a defeat of Kilcummin and a first county title in forty-five years.

Liston also served as a selector under Seán Boylan for the Irish compromise rules football teams in 2006 and 2008. He is also frequently touted as a possible future manager of the Kerry senior team.

== Honours ==
- In May 2020, the Irish Independent named Liston as one of the "dozens of brilliant players" who narrowly missed selection for its "Top 20 footballers in Ireland over the past 50 years".
