= Seán Walsh (footballer) =

Kerry Gaelic footballer

Personal information
- Native name: Seán Breathnach (Irish)
- Born: 6 April 1957 (age 69) Tralee, County Kerry, Ireland
- Occupation: Auctioneer
- Height: 1.85 m (6 ft 1 in)

Sport
- Sport: Gaelic football
- Position: Midfield
Club
- Years: Club
- Kerins O'Rahilly's
Inter-county
Years	County	Apps (scores)
1976-1987	Kerry	41 (6-22)
Inter-county titles
- Munster titles: 8
- All-Irelands: 7
- NFL: 3
- All Stars: 2

Seán Walsh (born 6 April 1957) is an Irish former Gaelic footballer who played for the Kerins O'Rahilly's club and at senior level for the Kerry county team between 1976 and 1987, during which he won seven All-Ireland SFC titles.

His sons Tommy and Barry John also played football for Kerry.
