= Paudie Lynch =

Kerry Gaelic footballer

Personal information
- Native name: Páidí Ó Loingsigh (Irish)
- Born: 2 February 1952 (age 74) Beaufort, County Kerry
- Height: 6 ft 0 in (183 cm)

Sport
- Sport: Gaelic football
- Position: Left wing-back
Club
- Years: Club
- 1970s–1980s: Beaufort
Inter-county
- Years: County
- 1972–1982: Kerry
Inter-county titles
- Munster titles: 8
- All-Irelands: 6
- NFL: 4
- All Stars: 3

Paudie Lynch (born 1952 in Beaufort, County Kerry) is an Irish former Gaelic footballer who played for Beaufort and at senior level for the Kerry county team between 1972 and 1982.
