= Ger O'Driscoll (Gaelic footballer) =

Kerry Gaelic footballer

Personal information
- Born: Valentia Island, County Kerry

Sport
- Sport: Gaelic football
- Position: Midfield
Club
- Years: Club
- 1970s–1980s: Young Islanders
Club titles
- Kerry titles: 2
Inter-county
Years	County	Apps (scores)
1975–1980	Kerry	7 (2–03)
Inter-county titles
- Munster titles: 3
- All-Irelands: 2

Ger O'Driscoll was a Gaelic footballer from Valentia Island, County Kerry. He played at senior level for the Kerry county team between 1975 and 1980. He also played for his local Young Islanders club.
