= Jack O'Shea =

Kerry Gaelic footballer

Personal information
- Native name: Seán Ó Sé (Irish)
- Nickname: Jacko
- Born: 19 November 1957 (age 68) Cahersiveen, County Kerry

Sport
- Sport: Gaelic football
- Position: Midfield
Clubs
- Years: Club
- 1970s–1984 1985-1997: St Mary's; Leixlip; Palatine, County Carlow
Club titles
- Kerry titles: 2
Inter-county
| Years | County | Apps (scores) |
| 1976–1992 | Kerry | 53 (11–55) |
Inter-county titles
- Munster titles: 10
- All-Irelands: 7
- NFL: 3
- All Stars: 6

John O'Shea (born 19 November 1957, Cahersiveen, County Kerry) is an Irish former Gaelic footballer. He at various times with his local clubs St Mary's in Kerry and Leixlip in Kildare and was a member of the highly successful Kerry senior football team from 1976 until 1992. Primarily a midfielder, O'Shea is regarded as one of the all-time great players, being selected at midfield in the GAA's Football Team of the Century in 1984 and winning the Footballer of the Year award a record four times.

== Personal life ==
O'Shea was born in Cahersiveen, south Kerry. Educated at Cahersiveen CBS, he is one of seven siblings (five sisters and two brothers). His father was a harness-maker who had a very bad accident in his early 30s and was never able to work again. O'Shea's mother was a local woman who ran the house. As a boy O'Shea hunted with dogs and did cross-country running with them. He believes he had a great upbringing, with the siblings all chipping into the family income, and "wasn't born with a silver spoon in my mouth". He was a plumber, has lived in Leixlip for many years, is married to Mary and has three children.

He has been a media pundit for the Irish edition of The Sunday Times.

While working as a plumber in Leixlip, O'Shea travelled back home every other weekend for eight years to play for his club. His son Aidan made his debut for the Kerry senior team in the 2009 National Football League.

He is a keen club golfer and once played a pro am against Ernie Els in 1990.

== Playing career ==
=== Club ===
O'Shea represented St Mary's, Cahersiveen, in the South Kerry league and championship.

=== Minor and Under 21 ===
By the early 1970s, O'Shea had come to prominence on the Kerry minor football team. He made his championship debut against Waterford in 1974. In 1975, a 3–7 to 1–11 defeat of arch-rivals Cork gave O'Shea a Munster winners' medal. That same year he was a late inclusion on Kerry's under-21 football team. O'Shea missed Kerry's Munster under-21 final triumph but lined out in the All-Ireland final defeat of Dublin by 1–15 to 0–10.

In 1976, O'Shea won his first Munster under-21 title as Kerry retained their provincial crown at the expense of Cork. In the All-Ireland final, Kildare were no match for Kerry and O'Shea collected a second winners' medal (0–14 to 1–3).

O'Shea's third consecutive Munster title came in 1977 with a two-goal defeat of Cork. In the All-Ireland final against Down, a 1–11 to 1–5 victory earned O'Shea a third winners' medal.

In 1978, O'Shea made it four Munster titles in a row, again at the expense of Cork. Kerry lost to Roscommon in the All-Ireland final by one point.

=== Senior ===
O'Shea made his senior debut with Kerry in late 1976 versus Meath in Navan. He won a first National Football League medal and later a first Munster title with Kerry's a win over Cork in the 1976–77 season. Kerry later took on Dublin for the third consecutive year, this time in the All-Ireland semi-final, which Kerry lost.

In 1978, O'Shea won a second consecutive Munster title and a first All-Ireland crown with Kerry's convincing victory over Dublin.

1979 saw O'Shea win a third Munster title before he lifted a second consecutive All-Ireland medal with his county's 3–13 to 1–8 win over Dublin.

Kerry's dominance continued in 1980. Another defeat of Cork in the provincial final gave O'Shea a fourth Munster winners' medal in a row. Roscommon were the opposition in the All-Ireland final. Kerry came from behind to win 1–9 to 1–6 victory in a game riddled with frees. The victory gave Kerry and O'Shea a third All-Ireland title in succession and he earned a first Texaco Footballer of the Year award.

In 1981, O'Shea won his fifth consecutive Munster title, before lining out in the All-Ireland final against Offaly. Kerry won handily to give O'Shea a fourth winners' medal. O'Shea also retained the Footballer of the Year title.

In 1982, O'Shea won his second National League medal before Kerry secured an eighth consecutive Munster final victory over Cork, his sixth provincial winners' medal. The All-Ireland final saw Kerry lose a memorable game late on to Offaly and the "five in a row" dream disappear.

Kerry missed out on a historic nine-in-a-row in Munster in 1983, as Cork finally triumphed. The Kingdom bounced back the following year with O'Shea winning his third National League medal and his seventh Munster title. The centenary-year All-Ireland final pitted Kerry against old rivals and reigning champions Dublin. Kerry defeated the holders 0–14 to 1–6. It was O'Shea's fifth All-Ireland winners' medal. A third Footballer of the Year award quickly followed. Also in this centenary year, O'Shea was selected in one of the midfield positions in the GAA's Football Team of the Century.

The following season saw Kerry defeat Cork to earn O'Shea an eighth Munster winners' medal. Another All-Ireland final against Dublin beckoned, in which O'Shea scored a key goal after eleven minutes and Kerry survived a fightback to win by 2–12 to 2–8. The victory gave O'Shea a sixth All-Ireland winners' medal. He was also voted Footballer of the Year for a record fourth occasion, while also collecting a record sixth All Star at midfield.

Cork fell again in the provincial final of 1986, giving O'Shea a ninth Munster title. In O'Shea's eighth All-Ireland final, a memorable game against Tyrone, Kerry came back to win by 2–15 to 1–10. It was O'Shea's seventh and final All-Ireland medal.

O'Shea earned an eleventh Munster title as captain of the team in 1991 but Kerry were defeated by eventual champions Down in the All-Ireland semi-final. He retired from inter-county football the following year when Clare defeated Kerry to win only their second-ever Munster Senior Football crown.

=== Interprovincial ===
O'Shea first played for Munster in the Railway Cup interprovincial football competition in 1977, with Munster defeating Connacht in the final by 1–14 to 1–9 and retaining the title the next season. After losing out in 1979 and 1980, O'Shea captured a third Railway Cup title in 1981 and a fourth in 1982. Despite representing Munster up until 1991, he never tasted Railway Cup success again.

=== Internationals ===
O'Shea represented Ireland in nine International Rules Tests against Australia. He played in all three Tests in each of the 1984 and 1986 series, and his international career culminated in being awarded the Harry Beitzel Medal as the outstanding player of the 1990 series.

== Managerial career ==
O'Shea enjoyed a very successful club management with Walterstown GAA (County Meath) in the early 1980s. In 1992 he was appointed manager of the Mayo senior football team. His two-year period produced one Connacht title. In his first year, he won the Connacht title by beating Roscommon by 1–5 to 0–7 before seeing his team heavily defeated by Cork in the All-Ireland semi-final. In O'Shea's second campaign as manager, Leitrim, led by former Mayo manager John O'Mahony, beat Mayo 0–12 to 2–4 in the Connacht final, after which O'Shea resigned as manager.

== Views on Gaelic games ==
O'Shea is a fan of the new rules other than advancing the ball 50 yards and the hooter. He feels Mick O'Dwyer was a "great man manager" and considered his Dublin rival Brian Mullins a "close friend". Players to whom O'Shea gave a particular mention in a BBC interview are: Colm McAlarney of Down, one of his "idols growing up"; Matt Connor of Offaly, one of the best ever; Peter McGinnity of Fermanagh; Greg Blaney and Conor Deegan of Down; Kerrymen Maurice Fitzgerald, John Egan, a laid back and relaxed individual but a "phenomenal player" and impossible to dispossess, Paudie Lynch – a highly versatile player from whom he learnt most – and David Clifford, whom O'Shea feels is as good as he's ever seen and the best kicker of a ball with either feet.

O'Shea was known as a midfielder, although he occasionally lined out in the forwards at minor and U-21 level. He was rarely injured and he missed only one game ever for Kerry, against Clare in 1979. He attributes his injury record to a mixture of hard training and adequate rest, as well as being a manual worker. James McCartan Jnr of Down believes O'Shea was the fittest player he ever met, which echoes what Tony Scullion said about the importance to O'Shea of strengthening the hamstrings through building work.

== Honours ==
Kerry

- Munster Minor Football Championship: 1 (1975)
- Munster Under-21 Football Championship: 3 (1976, 1977, 1978)
- All-Ireland Under-21 Football Championship: 3 (1975, 1976, 1977)
  - Runner-Up: 1 (1978)
- Munster Senior Football Championship: 10 (1977, 1978, 1979, 1980, 1981, 1982, 1984, 1985, 1986, 1991; capt.)
  - Runner-Up: 5 (1983, 1987, 1988, 1989, 1990, 1992)
- All-Ireland Senior Football Championship: 7 (1978, 1979, 1980, 1981, 1984, 1985, 1986)
  - Runner-Up: 1 (1982)
- National Football League: 3 (1976-77, 1981-82, 1983-84)
  - Runner-Up: 2 (1979-80, 1986-87)

Munster

- Railway Cup: 4 (1977, 1978, 1981, 1982)

Individual

- GAA's Football Team of the Century, 1984
- Texaco Footballer of the Year: 4 (1980, 1981, 1984, 1985)
- All Stars Awards: 6 (1980, 1981, 1982, 1983, 1984, 1985)
- In May 2020, a public poll conducted by RTÉ named O'Shea at midfield alongside Brian Fenton in a team of footballers who had won All Stars during the era of The Sunday Game.
- Also in May 2020, the Irish Independent named O'Shea at number one in its "Top 20 footballers in Ireland over the past 50 years".

Awards
| Preceded by Mikey Sheehy (Kerry) | Texaco Footballer of the Year; 1980 | Succeeded by retained |
| Preceded by current holder | Texaco Footballer of the Year; 1981 | Succeeded by Martin Furlong (Offaly) |
| Preceded by Tommy Drumm (Dublin) | Texaco Footballer of the Year; 1984 | Succeeded by retained |
| Preceded by current holder | Texaco Footballer of the Year; 1985 | Succeeded by Pat Spillane (Kerry) |
Sporting positions
| Preceded by John Egan (Gaelic footballer) | Kerry Senior Football Captain; 1983 | Succeeded by Diarmuid O'Donoghue |
| Preceded by David Farrell (Gaelic footballer) | Kerry Senior Football Captain; 1991 | Succeeded by Connie Murphy |
| Preceded by Brian McDonald | Mayo Senior Football Manager; 1992–1994 | Succeeded by Anthony Egan |
