= Ger Power =

Irish hurler and Gaelic footballer

Personal information
- Native name: Gearóid de Paor (Irish)
- Born: 27 June 1952 (age 74) Annacotty, County Limerick, Ireland
- Occupation: Civil servant
- Height: 5 ft 8 in (173 cm)

Sport
- Sport: Gaelic football
- Position: Left wing-back\wing-forward
Club
- Years: Club
- 1970s – 1990s: Austin Stacks
Club titles
- Kerry titles: 5
- Munster titles: 1
- All-Ireland Titles: 1
Inter-county
Years	County	Apps (scores)
1972–1988	Kerry	52 (14–34)
Inter-county titles
- Munster titles: 11
- All-Irelands: 8
- NFL: 5
- All Stars: 6

Gerard Power (born 27 June 1952) is an Irish former Gaelic footballer who played for the Austin Stacks club and at senior level for the Kerry county team between 1973 and 1988. Power captained Kerry to the All-Ireland title in 1980.

== Early life ==
Ger Power was born in Annacotty, County Limerick in 1952. He was little over a week old when his father, Jackie Power, who worked for CIÉ, was transferred to Tralee in County Kerry. Jackie was a great hurler with Limerick in the 1930s and 1940s, winning three All-Ireland medals in 1934, 1936 and 1940. He later played hurling with Kerry and was a huge influence on his son's sporting career. Ger Power began his inter-county career with the Kerry under-16 hurling team, however, he soon realised that football was the most important sport to Kerry people.

== Playing career ==
=== Club ===
Power played his club football with Austin Stacks in Tralee. He showed exceptional talent from a young age and played a key role when the club won an under-16 county championship. Power subsequently won seven Kerry SFC titles with the club throughout the 1970s and 1980s. One of these county titles was converted into an All-Ireland title in 1977.

He also played hurling with the club and won a Minor County Championship in 1967.

=== Inter-county ===
Power played with Kerry's minor football team for two years and was captain of the side when they lost to Galway in the 1970 All-Ireland final. Power was a substitute on the Kerry senior team that lost in a replay to Offaly in the All-Ireland final of 1972. He played with the under-21 side for three years, winning an All-Ireland medal in 1973. Two years later in 1975 Power had a very successful year with the Kerry senior team. He captured his very first Munster Championship and All-Ireland medals at senior level, under the new management of the legendary Mick O'Dwyer. It was the beginning of a glorious era for Kerry football and Power played a key role in orchestrating much of the success.

In 1976 Power won his second Munster title; however, Dublin gained revenge for the previous year by defeating Kerry in the All-Ireland final. 1977 was another frustrating year as Kerry won another Munster title but lost out to Dublin yet again, this time in a thrilling All-Ireland semi-final. By 1978 Kerry were ready for success. They easily won another Munster title and breezed into the All-Ireland final to face Dublin. The game itself is remembered for Mikey Sheehy's cheeky goal which he scored by lobbing the ball over the head of Paddy Cullen. The final score was 5–11 to 0–9 and Power had secured a second All-Ireland medal. In 1979, Kerry once again faced up to Dublin in the All-Ireland final; however, Power missed the game because of a hamstring injury. In spite of this he was playing the best football of his career and scored a massive 2–6 against Cork in the Munster final.

Victories for Kerry over Roscommon and Offaly in the respective All-Ireland finals of 1980 and 1981 brought Power's All-Ireland medal tally up to five. In 1980, he was captain of the side; however, he had to retire early from the game due to injury. In 1982, he collected his eighth consecutive Munster Championship medal and the scene was set for Kerry to become the first team in the history of the game to win five consecutive All-Ireland football titles. Once again, Power's side faced Offaly in the All-Ireland final. Kerry had the upper hand for much of the game and were leading by two points with two minutes left to be played. The game, however, was not over as Offaly substitute Séamus Darby, who had entered the game almost unnoticed, produced possibly the greatest match-winner of all-time when he scored a late goal. Kerry failed to score again to level the match and Offaly went on to win their third All-Ireland title ever.

In 1983, Kerry were denied a record-breaking ninth consecutive Munster title by Cork. Power's side were down but not out, as they reclaimed the provincial title the following year, before securing back-to-back All-Ireland victories over their old rivals Dublin in 1984 and 1985. In 1986, Power collected his third consecutive All-Ireland title with an 8-point victory over Tyrone. It was his seventh All-Ireland medal overall. In all Power collected eleven Munster Championship medals. He played in nine All-Ireland finals, ending up on the winning side on eight occasions. Power also enjoyed playing Railway Cup football with Munster, winning inter-provincial titles in 1975, 1976, 1977, 1978, 1981 and 1982. His honours also include four National Football Leagues in 1974, 1977, 1982 and 1984 and six All Stars Awards, winning All Stars at three different positions: half-back, half-forward and corner-forward.

=== Post career ===
After retiring Power became trainer of the Limerick senior football team during the 1990s. He was also part of the back-team with Austin Stacks. He has also trained the Kerry senior hurling team with John O'Keeffe.

Preceded by Tim Kennelly	Kerry Senior Football Captain; 1980	Succeeded by Jimmy Deenihan
Preceded by Tim Kennelly (Kerry)	All-Ireland SFC winning captain 1980	Succeeded by Jimmy Deenihan (Kerry)
