= Séamus Darby =

Offaly Gaelic footballer

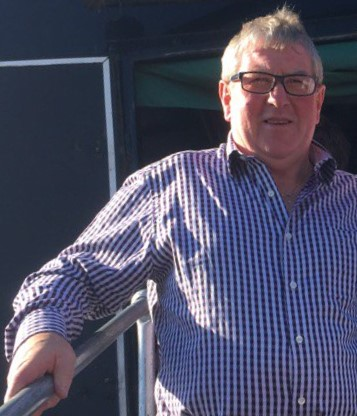

Personal information
- Native name: Séamus Ó Darbaig (Irish)
- Born: 1950 (age 75–76) Rhode, County Offaly, Ireland

Sport
Clubs
- Years: Club
- Rhode; Edenderry; Borrisokane
Inter-county
- Years: County
- Offaly
Inter-county titles
- Leinster titles: 3
- All-Irelands: 3

Séamus Darby (born 1950, Rhode, County Offaly) is an Irish former Gaelic footballer.

Darby is best remembered for scoring an unexpected late goal that deprived Kerry of a 5-in-a-row in the 1982 All-Ireland Senior Football Championship Final. In 2005, it was voted the third greatest moment in GAA history.

== Playing career ==
During his footballing career, Darby won Leinster Senior Football Championship titles with Offaly in 1972, 1973 and 1982, playing in various forward positions. He won his second All-Ireland medal in 1972 when Offaly defeated Kerry in the final. He had been an unused substitute in the 1971 final v Galway, Offaly's first-ever win. He was dropped from the county panel after the 1976 season.

Darby was recalled to the Offaly team for the 1982 Leinster final, playing full-forward against Dublin. He pulled a hamstring in that match and missed the All-Ireland semi-final against Galway. His replacement Johnny Mooney played well in that match so Darby was left on the bench for the final.

The 1982 All-Ireland Senior Football Championship Final was a repeat of the previous year's encounter and was also significant in that a win for Kerry would give them an unprecedented fifth All-Ireland Final victory in a row. Kerry were winning by two points with two minutes to go when Darby — who had arrived on the field of play as a substitute, with instructions to stay forward and try for a goal — got behind his marker Tommy Doyle, caught a "high, lobbing, dropping ball", and scored one of the most famous goals of all time. It was his only kick of the match. Kerry fumbled the counterattack which allowed Offaly to win by one single point with a score of 1–15 to 0–17.

In 2005, Darby's goal against Kerry was voted third in a poll to find the Top 20 GAA Moments.

The expression "to do a Séamus Darby" has been used in other fields.

Darby's last match for Offaly was the Leinster semi-final against Dublin in 1984. He played club football for Rhode till 1986. He later played for Edenderry in 1989, and for Borrisokane in County Tipperary in 1991.

== Later life ==
The 1982 All-Ireland and Darby's part in it received renewed attention in 2010 when the Kilkenny hurlers were aiming to complete their own five-in-a-row, also never realised.

Darby was interviewed for the documentary Players of the Faithful. This aired in 2018 when Dublin's footballers had just won their fourth consecutive All-Ireland Senior Football Championship and would be bidding for their fifth in 2019.

An episode of Laochra Gael dedicated to his life first aired on TG4 in 2019.
