= Mikey Sheehy =

Irish Gaelic footballer (born 1954)

Personal information
- Born: 28 July 1954 (age 72) Tralee, County Kerry, Ireland
- Occupation: Financial consultant
- Height: 5 ft 10 in (178 cm)

Sport
- Sport: Gaelic football
- Position: Right corner-forward
Club
- Years: Club
- Austin Stacks
Club titles
- Kerry titles: 5
- Munster titles: 1
- All-Ireland Titles: 1
Inter-county*
Years	County	Apps (scores)
1973–1988	Kerry	45 (29–205)
Inter-county titles
- Munster titles: 11
- All-Irelands: 8
- NFL: 3
- All Stars: 7
- *Inter County team apps and scores correct as of 18:49, 8 November 2016.

Michael Sheehy (born 28 July 1954) is an Irish Gaelic football selector and former player. His league and championship career at senior level with the Kerry county team spanned fifteen seasons from 1973 to 1988.

Sheehy's father Jim had played with the Laune Rangers club in his youth. Born in a council estate in Tralee, County Kerry, and the only boy in a family of seven, Sheehy first played competitive Gaelic football during his schooling at Tralee CBS. He first appeared for the Austin Stacks club at underage levels, before winning an All-Ireland medal with the senior team in 1977. Sheehy also won one Munster medal and five county club championship medals.

Sheehy made his debut on the inter-county scene at the age of sixteen when he was picked on the Kerry minor team. He played two championship seasons with the minors and was a Munster Minor Football Championship runner-up on both occasions. Sheehy subsequently joined the Kerry under-21 team, winning two All-Ireland Under-21 Football Championship medals in 1973 and 1975. By this stage he had also joined the Kerry senior team, making his debut during the 1973-74 league. Over the course of the next fifteen seasons, Sheehy won eight All-Ireland SFC medals, beginning in 1975, followed by a record-equalling four championships in a row from 1978 to 1981 and three championships in a row from 1984 to 1986. He also won eleven Munster SFC medals, three National Football League medals and was named Footballer of the Year in 1979. He played his last game for Kerry in July 1987.

After being chosen on the Munster inter-provincial team for the first time in 1976, Sheehy was an automatic choice on the starting fifteen for the following seven years. During that time he won five Railway Cup medals.

In retirement from playing, Sheehy became involved in team management and coaching. In 2012 he was appointed as a selector with the Kerry senior team. Since then he has helped steer the team to one All-Ireland title and four successive Munster titles.

Sheehy was named in the right corner-forward position on the Football Team of the Century in 1984. Sheehy was one of only two players from the modern era to be named on that team, and was also included (also in the right corner-forward position) on the Football Team of the Millennium in 1999. Sheehy also won seven All-Stars, while his tally of eight All-Ireland medals, albeit one as a non-playing substitute, is also a record which he shares with fellow Kerry players Páidí Ó Sé, Pat Spillane and Denis "Ógie" Moran. His scoring tally of 29-205 was a record which stood for 25 years.

Sheehy married in 1980 and has two sons.

== Playing career ==
=== Club ===
Sheehy played his club football with the local club, Austin Stacks, in Tralee. He won his first county senior championship title with the club in 1973, following a defeat of West Kerry. A second county winners' medal followed two years later, in 1975, following a win over Mid Kerry. Austin Stacks retained their title in 1976 before later representing the county in the provincial club series and even reaching the final. A narrow 1–7 to 0–8 defeat of St Finbarr's gave Sheehy a Munster club winners' medal. He later lined out at Croke Park for the All-Ireland final against Ballerin of Derry. The Ulster champions took an early lead, courtesy of two first-half goals. Sheehy, however, scored two late points, one from an acute line-ball and one from a 45-metre free, giving Austin Stacks a 1–13 to 2–7 win and Sheehy an All-Ireland club winners' medal.

=== Minor and under-21 ===
By the early 1970s, Sheehy had joined the Kerry minor football team; however, he had no success in this grade, as Cork dominated the provincial championship. He quickly progressed onto the Kerry under-21 team, where he captured a Munster Under-21 Football Championship title in 1973, following a one-goal defeat of Cork. Sheehy's side later qualified for the All-Ireland final with Mayo providing the opposition. A 2–13 to 0–13 score line gave Kerry the victory and earned Sheehy an All-Ireland Under-21 Football Championship winners' medal.

Two years later, in 1975, Sheehy secured a second Munster title, following a nine-point trouncing of Waterford. Kerry later qualified for the All-Ireland final with Dublin providing the opposition. A 1–15 to 0–10 scoreline for Kerry earned Sheehy a second All-Ireland under-21 winners' medal.

=== Senior ===
Sheehy made his senior inter-county debut for Kerry in the 1973–1974 National Football League campaign. Kerry reached the final of the competition and recorded a victory, following a replay, over Roscommon. Sheehy retained his place as a substitute for Kerry's unsuccessful Munster Senior Football Championship campaign.

In 1975 a new-look Kerry team was formed under the management of former player Mick O'Dwyer. That year Sheehy won his first senior Munster title, dethroning Cork as provincial champions in the process. Sheehy later lined out in his first senior All-Ireland SFC final. Reigning champions Dublin provided the opposition against over the youngest Kerry team of all time. On a rain-soaked day, John Egan and substitute Ger O'Driscoll scored two goals, and Dublin were beaten by 2–12 to 0–11. It was Sheehy's first All-Ireland SFC winners' medal.

In 1976 Sheehy captured his second Munster title, before later lining out in his second All-Ireland final. Once again it was Dublin who provided the opposition. Jimmy Keaveney converted a penalty to help Dublin to a 3–8 to 0–10 victory.

1977 began with Sheehy winning a second National League medal on the field of play, and a third consecutive Munster title following another win over Cork. Kerry later took on Dublin for the third consecutive year; however, this time it was in the All-Ireland semi-final. Dublin won the game.

In 1978, Kerry faced little competition in the provincial championship once again. A defeat of Cork gave Sheehy a fourth Munster winners' medal in a row. Kerry later qualified for a third All-Ireland final in four years. Old rivals Dublin provided the opposition. The game is chiefly remembered for Sheehy's sensational goal. The Kerry forward lobbed the ball over the head of Paddy Cullen, who was caught off his line arguing with the referee, Seamus Aldridge. At the full-time whistle, Kerry were the winners by 5–11 to 0–9.

In 1979, Kerry made it five-in-a-row in Munster, as Cork fell by ten points in the provincial final. Sheehy later went in search of a third All-Ireland medal as he lined out in a fourth championship decider. Dublin provided the opposition for the fifth consecutive occasion. Two goals by Sheehy and a third by John Egan, helped Kerry to a 3–13 to 1–8 victory. It was Sheehy's third All-Ireland winners' medal.

Kerry's dominance continued in 1980. Another defeat of Cork in the provincial final gave Sheehy a sixth Munster winners' medal in succession. Another All-Ireland final appearance beckoned, this time with Roscommon providing the opposition. The Connacht champions shocked Kerry, and took a five-point lead inside the first twelve minutes. Sheehy popped up again to score a decisive goal, as Kerry went on to claim a 1–9 to 1–6 victory in a game that contained sixty-four frees. The victory gave Kerry a third All-Ireland title in succession, while Sheehy added a fourth All-Ireland winners' medal to his collection.

In 1981, Sheehy won his seventh consecutive Munster title, before lining out in a fourth consecutive All-Ireland final against Offaly. He secured his fifth All-Ireland SFC winners' medal that day, with Kerry winning by a score of 1–12 to 0–8.

In 1982, Sheehy secured an eighth consecutive Munster final victory over Cork to keep Kerry's record-breaking All-Ireland SFC five-in-a-row bid intact. The championship decider pitted Kerry against Offaly for the second year in a row. Kerry had the upper hand for much of the game and, despite Sheehy missing a penalty with less than ten minutes remaining, were leading by two points with barely minutes left. Offaly substitute Séamus Darby then scored a late "brilliant" goal, as Sheehy called it. Kerry failed to take several chances to score again and Offaly went on to win their third All-Ireland title to shatter Kerry's five-in-a-row dream.

Kerry missed out on a historic nine-in-a-row in Munster in 1983, losing to Cork. Kerry recovered the following year, with Sheehy winning his third National League medal and his ninth Munster title. The centenary-year All-Ireland final pitted Kerry against old rivals, and reigning champions, Dublin. Kerry dominated the game from start to finish. Only two Dublin forwards scored as Kerry ran out easy winners on a score line 0–14 to 1–6. It was Sheehy's sixth All-Ireland winners' medal.

In 1985, a two-goal victory over Cork gave Sheehy a tenth Munster winners' medal. Another All-Ireland final beckoned, with Dublin providing the opposition for a second consecutive year. Kerry won by 2–1 to 2–8. The victory gave Sheehy a record-equalling seventh All-Ireland winners' medal.

In 1986 Cork fell again in the provincial final, giving Sheehy an eleventh Munster title. A tenth All-Ireland final appearance followed, and Tyrone provided the opposition in their first-ever Championship decider. Sheehy scored a second goal to give Kerry a 2–15 to 1–10 victory. The victory gave Sheehy a third All-Ireland medal in-a-row. It was his eighth All-Ireland SFC winners' medal overall, a record haul of championship medals and a record that he shared with fellow Kerrymen Páidí Ó Sé, Ger Power, Ogie Moran and Pat Spillane.

Cork won the Munster title following a replay in 1987. In the same year, Sheehy decided to retire from inter-county football.

According to Sheehy, the best player he played with was Jack O'Shea, whom he considered a superbly fit athlete. He also mentions Kevin Moran as a talented opponent.

=== Inter-provincial ===
Sheehy also lined out with Munster in the inter-provincial football competition. He first lined out with his province in 1976, as Munster defeated Leinster by 2–15 to 2–8. It was his first Railway Cup winners' medal, and the first of three in a row for Sheehy and for Munster. After losing out in 1979 and 1980, Spillane captured a fourth Railway Cup title in 1981. His fifth, and final, Railway Cup title came in 1982

=== Soccer ===
Sheehy also played soccer in his youth. He had been offered trials with Southampton F.C. in the early 1970s. He was given a list of fixtures for the Southampton reserve team, and told to travel over any weekend for a trial with the team. There was only one snag: he would have to pay his own way. Sheehy didn't think that was the way to do things, so he turned down the offer. Sheehy played for St. Brendan's Park F.C. in Tralee. Later in the supplement, it is said that he gave up soccer when he broke on to the Kerry senior team.

== Career statistics ==
Team	Season	National League			Munster		All-Ireland		Total	
Team	Season	Division	Apps	Score	Apps	Score	Apps	Score	Apps	Score
Kerry	1973-74	Division 1A	9	4-32	2	2-04	0	0-00	11	6-36
Kerry	1974-75	Division 1A	6	2-16	2	0-05	2	0-04	10	2-25
Kerry	1975-76	Division 1A	6	3-23	3	1-20	2	3-06	11	7-49
Kerry	1976-77	Division 1 (South)	5	1-18	1	0-03	1	0-07	7	1-28
Kerry	1977-78	Division 1 (South)	4	2-14	2	4-13	2	1-08	8	7-35
Kerry	1978-79	Division 1 (South)	6	2-20	2	1-07	2	5-11	10	8-38
Kerry	1979-80	Division 1 (South)	6	2-28	1	0-03	2	2-09	9	4-40
Kerry	1980-81	Division 1	6	4-14	2	1-11	2	0-11	10	5-36
Kerry	1981-82	Division 1	1	0-04	3	2-15	2	1-07	6	3-26
Kerry	1982-83	Division 1	5	1-18	2	2-11	0	0-00	7	3-29
Kerry	1983-84	Division 1	7	1-21	2	0-07	1	1-04	10	2-32
Kerry	1984-85	Division 1	0	0-00	2	1-10	3	0-11	5	1-21
Kerry	1985-86	Division 1	2	0-05	2	0-05	2	1-08	6	1-18
Kerry	1986-87	Division 1	8	0-31	2	1-05	0	0-00	10	1-36
Kerry	1987-88	Division 1	3	0-07	0	0-00	0	0-00	3	0-07
Total			74	22-251	28	15-129	21	14-86	123	51-466

== Individual honours ==
- In May 2020, the Irish Independent named Sheehy at number five in its "Top 20 footballers in Ireland over the past 50 years".

== See also ==
- List of people on the postage stamps of Ireland

Preceded by Pat Spillane (Kerry)	Texaco Footballer of the Year; 1979	Succeeded by Jack O'Shea (Kerry)
Preceded by Ger Power	Kerry Senior Football Captain; 1987	Succeeded by Pat Spillane
