= Leinster Senior Football Championship =

Annual Gaelic football competition in Ireland

- Current season or competition: 2026 Leinster Senior Football Championship
- Irish: Craobh Sinsir Peile Laighean
- Code: Gaelic football
- Founded: 1888; 138 years ago
- Region: Leinster (GAA)
- Trophy: Delaney Cup
- No. of teams: 11
- Title holders: Westmeath (2nd title)
- Most titles: Dublin (63 titles)
- Sponsors: SuperValu, Allianz, AIB
- TV partner(s): RTÉ; GAA+
- Motto: Experience The Unforgettable
- Official website: Official website

The Leinster Senior Football Championship, known simply as the Leinster Championship and shortened to Leinster SFC, is an annual inter-county Gaelic football competition organised by the Leinster Council of the Gaelic Athletic Association (GAA). It is the highest inter-county Gaelic football competition in the province of Leinster, and has been contested every year since the 1888 championship.

The final serves as the culmination of a series of games played during April and May, and the results determine which team receives the Delaney Cup. The championship has always been played on a straight knockout basis, whereby once a team loses they are eliminated from the championship.

The Leinster SFC is an integral part of the wider All-Ireland Senior Football Championship. The winners of the Leinster SFC final, like their counterparts in Connacht, Munster and Ulster, are rewarded by advancing directly to the All-Ireland SFC quarter-finals. Depending on results earlier in the season and elsewhere, some of the defeated teams may advance to the All-Ireland SFC, while other defeated teams play any further games they may have in the Tailteann Cup.

11 teams currently participate in the Leinster SFC. One of the most successful team in Gaelic football, namely Dublin, play their provincial football in this competition, and have won the title on a record 63 occasions, while they have also claimed 30 All-Ireland SFC titles.

The Leinster SFC title has been won at least once by 11 of the Leinster counties, eight of which have won the title more than once. Wicklow are the only team never to have won the title, while three-time winner Kilkenny no longer participate. Dublin have dominated the competition since its beginning.. Westmeath are the title holders, defeating Dublin by 2-28 to 0–26 in the 2026 final.

== History ==
=== Development ===
Following the foundation of the Gaelic Athletic Association in 1884, new rules for Gaelic football and hurling were drawn up and published in the United Irishman newspaper. In 1886, county committees began to be established, with several counties affiliating over the next few years. The GAA ran its inaugural All-Ireland Senior Football Championship in 1887. The decision to establish that first championship was influenced by several factors. Firstly, inter-club contests in 1885 and 1886 were wildly popular and began to draw huge crowds. Clubs started to travel across the country to play against each other and these matches generated intense interest as the newspapers began to speculate which teams might be considered the best in the country. Secondly, although the number of clubs was growing, many were slow to affiliate to the Association, leaving it short of money. Establishing a central championship held the prospect of enticing GAA clubs to process their affiliations, just as the establishment of the FA Cup had done much in the 1870s to promote the development of the Football Association in England. The championships were open to all affiliated clubs who would first compete in county-based competitions, to be run by local county committees. The winners of each county championship would then proceed to represent that county in the All-Ireland series. For the first and only time in its history the All-Ireland Championship used an open draw format. 12 teams entered the first championship, however, this number increased to 15 in 1888. Because of this, and in an effort to reduce travelling costs, the GAA decided to introduce provincial championships.

=== Beginnings ===
The inaugural Leinster Championship featured Dublin, Kildare, Kilkenny, Louth, Meath, Queen's County, Wexford and Wicklow. Dublin and Kildare contested the very first match on Sunday 3 June 1888. Wicklow beat Wexford in the third quarter-final a month later, however, a replay was ordered after the game was stopped with ten minutes to go as a result of a pitch invasion, and it was also revealed that Wicklow had played a number of illegal player. Postponements, disqualifications, objections, withdrawals and walkovers were regular occurrences during the initial years of the championship. The inaugural Leinster final between Kilkenny and Wexford was played on Sunday 23 September 1888, with Kilkenny claiming a 1–4 to 0–2 victory.

=== Team dominance ===
The first years of the Leinster Championship saw one of the most equitable eras in terms of titles won, with five different teams claiming their inaugural titles between 1888 and 1895. In winning the 1892 Leinster final, Dublin, as well as becoming the first team to retain the title, also set in train a level of championship dominance that continues to the present day. After two decades of dominance, Wexford broke the hegemony by setting a new record of six successive titles between 1913 and 1918. Dublin remained the standard-bearers of the province, however, Kildare emerged as a new force, winning eight titles between 1919 and 1935. Since winning their second ever title in 1939, Meath enjoyed some brief periods of dominance and claimed titles in each of the decades that followed to eventually become second only to Dublin in the all-time roll of honour by 1970. A Dublin resurgence in the 1970s was followed by Meath's most successful era, winning eight titles between 1986 and 2001 under Seán Boylan. In the 21st century Dublin set a new record of fourteen-in-a-row between 2011 and 2024. In 2025 Louth won the title, ending the long Dublin era.

=== Leinster SFC moments ===
- Meath 1–12 – 1–10 Louth (11 July 2010): Meath won the Leinster SFC final, due to a controversial late goal they scored. Many observers, particularly Louth supporters, believed that the goal should have been disallowed due to a foul. This incident led to debate regarding officiating standards and fair play.
- Carlow 2–14 – 1–10 Kildare (27 May 2018): In a quarter-final clash, Carlow pulled off a notable upset by defeating Kildare. Carlow's victory surprised many, as Division 1 Kildare were the favorites going into the game against their Division 4 opponents. The result marked a brief rise of Carlow football, in a county whose hurlers are more traditionally competitive, playing at Joe MacDonagh and Liam McCarthy Cup level.
- Meath 0–23 – 1–16 Dublin (27 April 2025): Meath ended Dublin’s 15-year dominance of the Leinster SFC with a famous semi-final victory in Portlaoise. The Royals produced a stunning first-half display and held off a late Dublin comeback to reach their first Leinster final since 2010. The defeat was Dublin’s first in the Leinster championship since Meath had last beaten them fifteen years earlier, and signalled a major shift in the balance of power within the province.
- Westmeath 2–28 – 0–26 Dublin (17 May 2026): Westmeath claimed only their second ever Leinster SFC title after defeating Dublin after extra time at Croke Park. Having also overcome Meath and Kildare on their run to the final, Westmeath defeated Leinster football’s traditional “big three” to secure their first provincial crown since 2004. The triumph was widely regarded as one of the greatest upsets in championship history.

== Format ==
=== Overview ===
The Leinster Championship is a single elimination tournament. Each team is afforded only one defeat before being eliminated from the championship. The draw is seeded, with the previous year's semi-finalists receiving byes to the quarter-finals. Six of the remaining seven teams are drawn together in three first round matches, while the seventh team also receives a bye to the quarter-finals.

In September 2019, the Leinster Council decided against awarding champions Dublin a bye into the semi-final stage; instead deciding to retain the status quo. The Leinster Council did, however, introduce a semi-final draw scheduled for the Sunday night when all quarter-final winners were confirmed, meaning that semi-finalists would not know if they were on the champions' side of the draw until two weeks before the game.

=== Progression ===
	Teams entering in this round	Teams advancing from previous round
First round (6 teams)	6 teams drawn at random	
Quarter-finals (8 teams)	4 seeded teams; 1 team drawn at random	3 winners from the first round
Semi-finals (4 teams)		4 winners from the quarter-finals
Final (2 teams)		2 winners from the semi-finals

== Qualification for subsequent competitions ==
- The winners and runners-up of the championship qualify to the All-Ireland Senior Football Championship group stage. The remaining nine Leinster teams may also qualify to the all-Ireland group stage via the National Football League. Those who fail to do so qualify to the Tailteann Cup.
- Before the introduction of the qualifiers in 2001, the winners of the Leinster Championship went straight to the semi-final stage of the All-Ireland Championship, along with the winners of the Connacht, Munster and Ulster Championships.

== Teams ==
=== 2026 teams ===
Eleven counties competed in the 2026 Leinster Senior Football Championship.

County	Location	Stadium	Position in 2026	Leinster SFC titles	Last Leinster SFC title	All-Ireland SFC titles	Last All-Ireland SFC title
Carlow	Carlow	Dr Cullen Park	Preliminary round	1	1944	0	—N/a
Dublin	Donnycarney	Parnell Park	Runners-up	63	2024	30	2023
Kildare	Newbridge	St Conleth's Park	Semi-finalist	13	2000	4	1928
Laois	Portlaoise	O'Moore Park	Quarter-finalist	6	2003	0	—N/a
Longford	Longford	Pearse Park	Preliminary round	1	1968	0	—N/a
Louth	Drogheda	Drogheda Park	Semi-finalist	9	2025	3	1957
Meath	Navan	Páirc Tailteann	Quarter-finalist	21	2010	7	1999
Offaly	Tullamore	O'Connor Park	Preliminary round	10	1997	3	1982
Westmeath	Mullingar	Cusack Park	Champions	2	2026	0	—N/a
Wexford	Wexford	Chadwicks Wexford Park	Quarter-finalist	10	1945	5	1918
Wicklow	Aughrim	Aughrim County Ground	Quarter-finalist	0	—N/a	0	—N/a

=== Personnel and kits ===
County	Manager	Captain	Sponsors
Carlow	Niall Carew	Sean Gannon	SETU
Dublin	Ger Brennan	Vacant	Staycity
Kildare	Brian Flanagan	Mick O'Grady	Brady Family
Laois	Justin McNulty	Trevor Collins and Evan O'Carroll	MW Hire Group
Longford	Mike Solan	Patrick Fox	Glennon Brothers
Louth	Gavin Devlin	Sam Mulroy	STATSports
Meath	Robbie Brennan	Eoghan Frayne	Bective Stud, Tea Rooms and Apartments
Offaly	Mickey Harte	Lee Pearson	Glenisk
Westmeath	Mark McHugh	Ronan Wallace	TEG
Wexford	John Hegarty	Liam Coleman	Zurich Insurance Group
Wicklow	Oisín McConville	Padraig O'Toole	Joule

== Trophy and medals ==
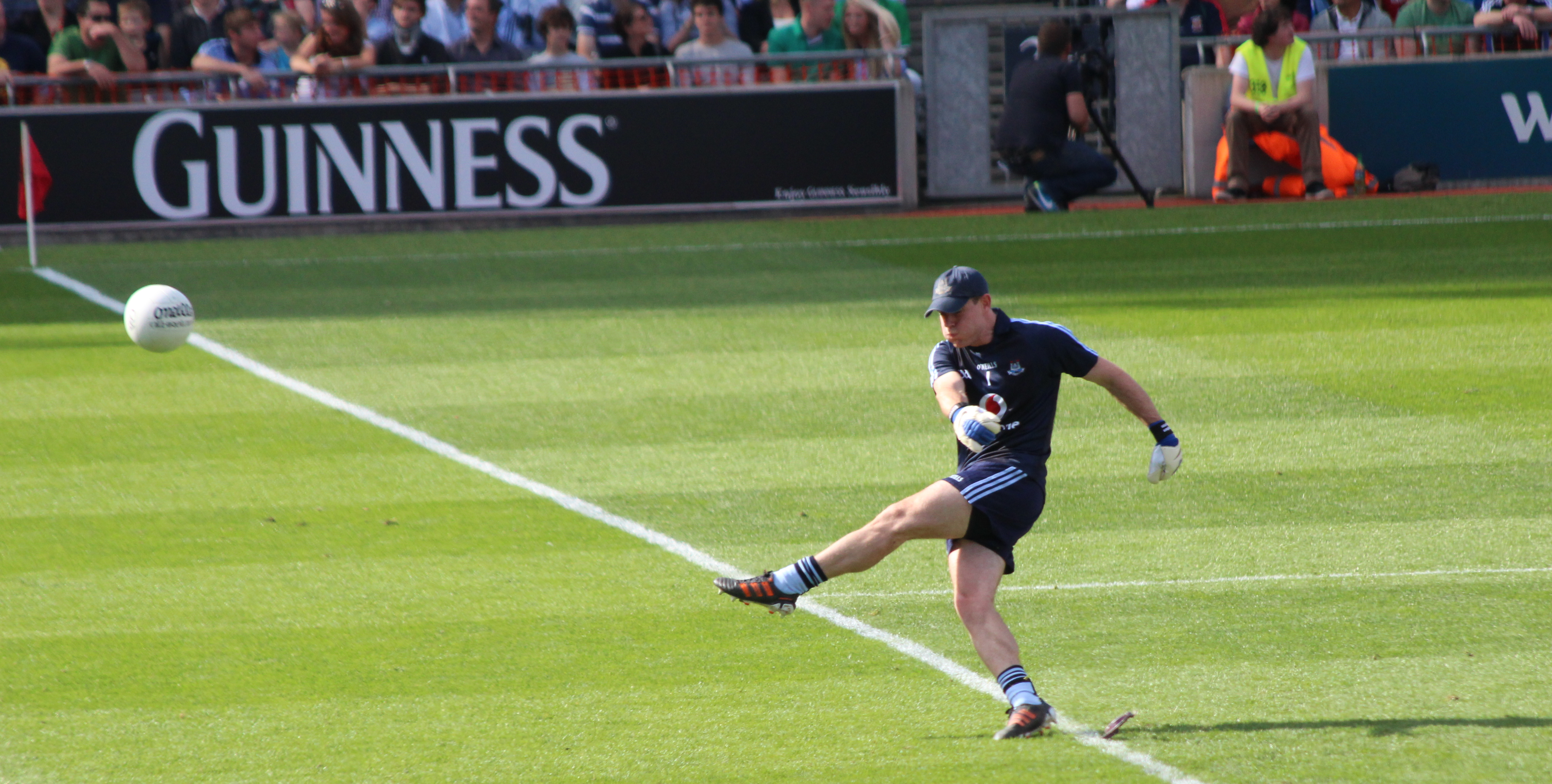
Stephen Cluxton of Dublin has won a record 18 Leinster medals.

At the end of the Leinster SFC final, the winning team is presented with a trophy. The Delaney Cup is held by the winning team until the following year's final. Traditionally, the presentation is made at a special rostrum in the Hogan Stand of Croke Park, where GAA and political dignitaries and special guests view the match.

The cup is decorated with ribbons in the colours of the winning team. During the game the cup actually has both teams' sets of ribbons attached and the runners-up ribbons are removed before the presentation. The winning captain accepts the cup on behalf of his team before giving a short speech. Individual members of the winning team and management then have an opportunity to come to the rostrum to lift the cup.

The current cup was first presented after the 1953 final, however, it would be another 50 years before it was named the Delaney Cup. The Delaney brothers were a famous Gaelic football family from Portlaoise who lined out at club, county and provincial level.

In accordance with GAA rules, the Leinster Council awards up to twenty-six gold medals to the winners of the Leinster SFC final.

== List of finals ==
=== List of Leinster SFC finals ===
Year	Date	Winner		Runner-up		Venue	Winning captain(s)	Winning margin	Referee
Year	Date	County team	Score	County team	Score	Venue	Winning captain(s)	Winning margin	Referee
1888	23 September	Kilkenny	1–04	Wexford	0–02	New Ross		5	
1889	13 October	Laois	0-03	Louth	0-02	Inchicore		1	JJ Reilly
1890	2 November	Wexford	1–03	Dublin	1–02	Clonturk Park		1	
1891	8 November	Dublin	w/o	Kildare	scr.	Clonturk Park		Dublin awarded	
1892	12 March 1893	Dublin	w/o	Louth	scr.	Clonturk Park		Dublin awarded	JP Cox
1893	3 June 1894	Wexford	0–01	Kilkenny	0–05	Wexford Park		4 but title was awarded to Wexford	
1894	24 February 1895 (2nd replay)	Dublin	1–08	Meath	1–02	Clonturk Park		6	
1895	1 March 1896	Meath	0–06	Dublin	0–02	Jones Road		4	
1896	24 October 1897	Dublin	2–04	Meath	1–05	Jones Road		4	
1897	18 December 1898	Dublin	1–09	Wicklow	0–03	Jones Road		9	
1898	4 February 1900	Dublin	2–06	Wexford	0–00	Jones Road		12	
1899	13 January 1901	Dublin	1–07	Wexford	0–03	Jones Road		7	
1900	3 November 1901	Kilkenny	0–12	Louth	0–02	Wexford Park		10	W.H. Redmond (Dublin)
1901	22 March 1903	Dublin	1–09	Wexford	0–01	Kilkenny		12	John McCarthy (Kilkenny)
1902	12 June 1904	Dublin*	1–05	Wexford	0–05	Kilkenny		3	
1903	4 June 1905	Kildare	0–09	Kilkenny	0–01	Jones Road		9	M. F. Crowe (Dublin)
1904	17 June 1906	Dublin	0-05	Kilkenny	0-01	Wexford Park		4	Jack Fitzgerald (Kildare)
1905	6 January 1907	Kildare	0–12	Louth	1–07	Jones Road		2	
1906	7 July 1907	Dublin	1–09	Kildare	0–08	Kilkenny		4	John Kennedy (Wexford)
1907	26 April 1908	Dublin	1–11	Offaly	0–04	Athy		10	
1908	13 December	Dublin	1–07	Kildare	0–03	Athy		5	
1909	24 October	Louth	2–09	Kilkenny	0–04	Jones Road	Jack Carvin	11	M.F. Crowe (Dublin)
1910	16 October	Louth	0-03	Dublin	0-00	Jones Road	Larry McCormack	3	S. McNamee (Meath)
1911	22 October	Kilkenny	2–04	Meath	1-01	Inchicore		6	
1912	20 October	Louth	1–02	Dublin	1–01	Navan	Jim Smith	1	John May (Kildare)
1913	21 September	Wexford	2–03	Louth	2–02	Croke Park		1	Jack Fitzgerald (Kildare)
1914	16 August	Wexford	3–06	Louth	0–01	Croke Park		14	Patrick Dunphy (Laois)
1915	10 October (replay)	Wexford	2–05	Dublin	1–04	Croke Park	Seán O'Kennedy	4	Patrick Dunphy (Laois)
1916	15 October	Wexford	1–07	Kildare	1–00	Croke Park	Seán O'Kennedy	7	Patrick Dunphy (Laois)
1917	14 October	Wexford	1–03	Dublin	1–01	Croke Park	Seán O'Kennedy	2	A Rogers (Louth)
1918	19 January 1919	Wexford	2–05	Louth	1–04	Croke Park	Jim Byrne	4	
1919	7 September	Kildare	1–03	Dublin	1–02	Croke Park	Larry Stanley	1	
1920	29 August	Dublin	1–03	Kildare	0–03	Croke Park	P McDonnell	3	PD Breen (Wexford)
1921	18 September (replay)	Dublin	3–03	Kildare	1–02	Croke Park	Eddie Carroll	7	James Byrne (Wexford)
1922	5 November	Dublin	1–07	Kilkenny	0–02	Croke Park	Paddy Carey	8	James Byrne (Wexford)
1923	12 August	Dublin	3–05	Meath	0–00	Croke Park	Paddy McDonnell	14	
1924	30 November (replay)	Dublin	3–05	Wexford	2–03	Croke Park	Paddy McDonnell	5	
1925	23 August	Wexford	2–07	Kildare	0–03	Croke Park		10	Tom Burke (Louth)
1926	1 August	Kildare	2–08	Wexford	1–05	Croke Park		6	Tom Burke (Louth)
1927	14 August	Kildare	0-05	Dublin	0-03	Croke Park	Mick Buckley	2	Tom Burke (Louth)
1928	22 July	Kildare	0–10	Dublin	1–06	Croke Park	Bill 'Squires' Gannon	1	Jim Byrne (Wexford)
1929	21 July	Kildare	2–03	Laois	0–06	Croke Park	Jack Higgins	3	
1930	17 August (replay)	Kildare	2–06	Meath	1–02	Croke Park		7	
1931	9 August	Kildare	2–09	Westmeath	1–06	Croke Park	Mick Walsh	6	J. Donoghue (Wexford)
1932	14 August (replay)	Dublin	4–06	Wexford	1–05	Croke Park		10	Tom Burke (Louth)
1933	30 July	Dublin	0–09	Wexford	1–04	Croke Park		2	J.V. Kelly (Longford)
1934	19 August (2nd replay)	Dublin	2–09	Louth	1–10	Croke Park		2	Sean Robbins (Offaly)
1935	28 July	Kildare	0–08	Louth	0–06	Croke Park		2	Martin Lynch (Carlow)
1936	19 July	Laois	3–03	Kildare	0–08	Croke Park	J. McDonnell	4	Martin Lynch (Carlow)
1937	25 July	Laois	0-12	Louth	0–04	Croke Park		8	Martin Lynch (Carlow)
1938	7 August	Laois	2–08	Kildare	1–03	Croke Park		8	Dave Hamilton (Dublin)
1939	30 July	Meath	2–07	Wexford	2–03	Croke Park	Matt Gilsenan	4	J. Dunne (Dublin)
1940	28 July	Meath	2–07	Laois	1–07	Croke Park	Matt Gilsenan	3	Dave Hamilton (Dublin)
1941	9 November	Dublin	4–06	Carlow	1–04	Dr Cullen Park, Carlow		8	Tom Kehoe (Wexford)
1942	19 July	Dublin	0–08	Carlow	0–06	Geraldine Park, Athy	Joe Fitzgerald	2	Peter Waters (Kildare)
1943	25 July	Louth	3–16	Laois	2–04	Croke Park	Jack Regan	10	Paddy Mythen (Wexford)
1944	30 July	Carlow	2–06	Dublin	1–06	Geraldine Park, Athy		3	J. Dowling (Kildare)
1945	22 July	Wexford	1–09	Offaly	1–04	O'Moore Park, Portlaoise		5	Mick Leech (Louth)
1946	14 July	Laois	0–11	Kildare	1–06	Croke Park		2	Patsy Ratty (Meath)
1947	20 July	Meath	3–07	Laois	1–07	Croke Park		6	Paddy Mythen (Wexford)
1948	11 July	Louth	2–10	Wexford	2–05	Croke Park	Jim Quigley	5	Jimmy Flaherty (Offaly)
1949	31 July	Meath	4–5	Westmeath	0–6	Croke Park	Brain Symth	11	J. Dowling (Kildare)
1950	6 August (replay)	Louth	3–5	Meath	0–13	Croke Park	Tom Conlon	4	J. Conroy (Laois)
1951	5 August	Meath	4–9	Laois	0–3	Croke Park	Séamus Heery	18	Paddy Mythen (Wexford)
1952	13 July	Meath	1–6	Louth	0–8	Croke Park	Paddy Meegan	1	Bill Delaney (Laois)
1953	26 July	Louth	1–7	Wexford	0–7	Croke Park	Jack Regan	3	Bill Delaney (Laois)
1954	25 July	Meath	4–7	Offaly	2–10	Croke Park	Peter McDermott	3	Bill Goodison (Wexford)
1955	24 July	Dublin	5–12	Meath	0–7	Croke Park	Denis Mahony	20	Bill Goodison (Wexford)
1956	22 July	Kildare	2–11	Wexford	1–8	Croke Park		6	Mick McArdle (Louth)
1957	7 July	Louth	2–9	Dublin	1–7	Croke Park	Dermot O'Brien	5	Eamonn Moules (Wicklow)
1958	20 July	Dublin	1–11	Louth	1–6	Croke Park	Kevin Heffernan	5	John Dowling (Offaly)
1959	2 August	Dublin	1–18	Laois	2–8	Croke Park		7	John Dowling (Offaly)
1960	31 July	Offaly	0–10	Louth	1–6	Croke Park	Donie Hanlon	1	Brian Smyth (Meath)
1961	23 July	Offaly	1–13	Dublin	1–8	O'Moore Park, Portlaoise	Willie Nolan	5	J. Kavanagh (Kildare)
1962	15 July	Dublin	2–8	Offaly	1–7	Croke Park	Kevin Heffernan	4	Eamonn Moules (Wicklow)
1963	14 July	Dublin	2–11	Laois	2–9	Croke Park	Des Foley	2	Brian Smyth (Meath)
1964	26 July	Meath	2–12	Dublin	1–7	Croke Park		8	John Dowling (Offaly)
1965	25 July	Dublin	3–6	Longford	0–9	Croke Park		6	Paddy Hughes (Louth)
1966	24 July	Meath	1–9	Kildare	1–8	Croke Park	Dave Carty	1	John Dowling (Offaly)
1967	23 July	Meath	0–8	Offaly	0–6	Croke Park	Peter Darby	2	Jim Shannon (Dublin)
1968	21 July	Longford	3–9	Laois	1–4	Croke Park		11	John Dowling (Offaly)
1969	27 July	Offaly	3–07	Kildare	1–8	Croke Park	Johnny Egan	5	Brendan Hayden (Carlow)
1970	19 July	Meath	2–22	Offaly	5–12	Croke Park	Jack Quinn	1	Brendan Hayden (Carlow)
1971	18 July	Offaly	2–14	Kildare	0–6	Croke Park	Willie Bryan	14	P. Kelly (Dublin)
1972	23 July	Offaly	1–18	Kildare	2–8	Croke Park	Tony McTague	7	George Hoey (Louth)
1973	22 July	Offaly	3–21	Meath	2–12	Croke Park	Pat Keenan	12	Brendan Hayden (Carlow)
1974	28 July	Dublin	1–14	Meath	1–9	Croke Park	Seán Doherty	5	Paddy Collins (Westmeath)
1975	27 July	Dublin	3–13	Kildare	0–8	Croke Park	Seán Doherty	14	Brendan Hayden (Carlow)
1976	25 July	Dublin	2–8	Meath	1–9	Croke Park	Tony Hanahoe	2	Seamus Aldridge (Kildare)
1977	31 July	Dublin	1–9	Meath	0–8	Croke Park	Tony Hanahoe	4	Seamus Aldridge (Kildare)
1978	30 July	Dublin	1–17	Kildare	1–6	Croke Park	Tony Hanahoe	11	Paddy Collins (Westmeath)
1979	29 July	Dublin	1–8	Offaly	0–9	Croke Park	Tony Hanahoe	2	Paddy Collins (Westmeath)
1980	27 July	Offaly	1–10	Dublin	1–8	Croke Park	Richie Connor	2	Paddy Kavanagh (Meath)
1981	26 July	Offaly	1–18	Laois	3–9	Croke Park	Richie Connor	3	Paddy Collins (Westmeath)
1982	1 August	Offaly	1–16	Dublin	1–7	Croke Park	Richie Connor	9	Paddy Collins (Westmeath)
1983	31 July	Dublin	2–13	Offaly	1–11	Croke Park	Tommy Drumm	5	Paddy Collins (Westmeath)
1984	22 July	Dublin	2–10	Meath	1–9	Croke Park	Tommy Drumm	4	J. Gunning (Offaly)
1985	28 July	Dublin	0–10	Laois	0–4	Croke Park	Brian Mullins	6	Paddy Kavanagh (Meath)
1986	27 July	Meath	0-9	Dublin	0-7	Croke Park	Joe Cassells	2	Seamus Aldridge (Kildare)
1987	26 July	Meath	1-13	Dublin	0-12	Croke Park	Mick Lyons	4	Seamus Aldridge (Kildare)
1988	31 July	Meath	2-05	Dublin	0-9	Croke Park	Joe Cassells	2	Seamus Aldridge (Kildare)
1989	30 July	Dublin	2-12	Meath	1-10	Croke Park	Gerry Hargan	5	S. Kelly (Carlow)
1990	29 July	Meath	1-14	Dublin	0-14	Croke Park	Colm O'Rourke	3	Paddy Collins (Westmeath)
1991	10 August	Meath	1-11	Laois	0-8	Croke Park	Liam Hayes	6	Tommy Howard (Kildare)
1992	26 July	Dublin	1-13	Kildare	0-10	Croke Park	Tommy Carr	6	Brian White (Wexford)
1993	25 July	Dublin	0-11	Kildare	0-7	Croke Park	John O'Leary	4	T. McDermott (Cavan)
1994	31 July	Dublin	1-9	Meath	1-8	Croke Park	John O'Leary	1	Brian White (Wexford)
1995	30 July	Dublin	1-18	Meath	1-8	Croke Park	John O'Leary	10	P. Casserly (Westmeath)
1996	28 July	Meath	0-10	Dublin	0-8	Croke Park	Tommy Dowd	2	Brian White (Wexford)
1997	16 August	Offaly	3-17	Meath	1-15	Croke Park		8	Brian White (Wexford)
1998	2 August	Kildare	1-12	Meath	0-10	Croke Park	Glenn Ryan	5	John Bannon (Longford)
1999	1 August	Meath	1-14	Dublin	0-12	Croke Park	Graham Geraghty	5	Mick Curley (Galway)
2000	12 August (replay)	Kildare	2-11	Dublin	0-12	Croke Park		5	Pat McEnaney (Monaghan)
2001	15 July	Meath	2-11	Dublin	0-14	Croke Park	Trevor Giles	3	Mick Curley (Galway)
2002	14 July	Dublin	2-13	Kildare	2-11	Croke Park	Coman Goggins	2	Michael Collins (Cork)
2003	20 July	Laois	2-13	Kildare	1-13	Croke Park	Ian Fitzgerald	3	S. McCormack (Meath)
2004	24 July (replay)	Westmeath	0-12	Laois	0-10	Croke Park	David O'Shaughnessy	2	Michael Monahan (Kildare)
2005	17 July	Dublin	0-14	Laois	0-13	Croke Park	Paddy Christie	1	Joe McQuillan (Cavan)
2006	16 July	Dublin	1-15	Offaly	0-9	Croke Park	Colin Moran	9	M. Duffy (Sligo)
2007	15 July	Dublin	3-15	Laois	1-15	Croke Park	Colin Moran	6	Michael Hughes (Tyrone)
2008	20 July	Dublin	3-23	Wexford	0-9	Croke Park	Alan Brogan	23	Gearoid Ó Conamha (Galway)
2009	12 July	Dublin	2-15	Kildare	0-18	Croke Park	Paul Griffin	3	Pat McEnaney (Monaghan)
2010	11 July	Meath	1-12	Louth	1-10	Croke Park	Nigel Crawford	2	Martin Sludden (Tyrone)
2011	10 July	Dublin	2-12	Wexford	1-12	Croke Park	Bryan Cullen	3	Joe McQuillan (Cavan)
2012	22 July	Dublin	2-13	Meath	1-13	Croke Park	Bryan Cullen	3	Marty Duffy (Sligo)
2013	14 July	Dublin	2-15	Meath	0-14	Croke Park	Stephen Cluxton	7	Eddie Kinsella (Laois)
2014	20 July	Dublin	3-20	Meath	1-10	Croke Park	Stephen Cluxton	16	Pádraig Hughes (Armagh)
2015	12 July	Dublin	2-13	Westmeath	0-6	Croke Park	Stephen Cluxton	13	Joe McQuillan (Cavan)
2016	17 July	Dublin	2-19	Westmeath	0-10	Croke Park	Stephen Cluxton	15	Fergal Kelly (Longford)
2017	16 July	Dublin	2-23	Kildare	1-17	Croke Park	Stephen Cluxton	9	Anthony Nolan (Wicklow)
2018	24 June	Dublin	1-25	Laois	0-10	Croke Park	Stephen Cluxton	18	Barry Cassidy (Derry)
2019	23 June	Dublin	1-17	Meath	0-4	Croke Park	Stephen Cluxton	16	Sean Hurson (Tyrone)
2020	21 November	Dublin	3-21	Meath	0-9	Croke Park	Stephen Cluxton	21	Derek O'Mahoney (Tipperary)
2021	1 August	Dublin	1-20	Kildare	0-9	Croke Park	Johnny Cooper	14	Martin McNally (Monaghan)
2022	28 May	Dublin	5-17	Kildare	1-15	Croke Park	James McCarthy	14	Paddy Neilan (Roscommon)
2023	14 May	Dublin	5-21	Louth	0-15	Croke Park	James McCarthy	21	Conor Lane (Cork)
2024	12 May	Dublin	1-19	Louth	2-12	Croke Park	James McCarthy	4	Noel Mooney (Cavan)
2025	11 May	Louth	3-14	Meath	1-18	Croke Park	Sam Mulroy	2	Martin McNally (Monaghan)
2026	17 May	Westmeath	2-28	Dublin	0-26	Croke Park	Ronan Wallace	10 (a.e.t.)	

== Matches ==
=== Details of all finals ===
2026	Westmeath	2–28 – 0–26	Dublin	Croke Park; Attendance: 36,536; Referee: David Coldrick (Meath)
2026	Cormac Costello 0-8 (4f, 1tpf), Ciarán Kilkenny 0-3, Niall Scully 0-2, Paddy Small 0-2, David Byrne 0-2, Seán Bugler 0-2, Seán Guiden 0-2 (tp), Greg McEneaney 0-2, Eoin Kennedy 0-1, Luke Breathnach 0-1, Brian Howard 0-1 each.	Report	points2=Jack Duncan 1-1, Brandon Kelly 0-4, Matthew Whittaker 0-4 (1tp), Senan Baker 0-4, Brían Cooney 1-0, Ronan Wallace 0-3, John Heslin 0-3 (1tp, 1f), Kevin O'Sullivan 0-2, Shane Allen 0-2 (tp), Sam McCartan 0-2, Shane Corcoran 0-1, Conor Dillon 0-1, Robbie Forde 0-1 each.	Croke Park; Attendance: 36,536; Referee: David Coldrick (Meath)

2025	Louth	3-14 – 1-18	Meath	Croke Park; Attendance: 65,786; Referee: Martin McNally (Monaghan); Man of the Match: Sam Mulroy
2025	S. Mulroy 1-7 (2f, 1 2pf, 1 '45), R. Burns 1-3 (1 2p), C. Lennon 1-1, C. Downey, B. Duffy, C. Grimes 0-1 each	Report	M. Costello 1-1, E. Frayne 0-4 (2f), B. Hogan 0-4 (2 2pf), R. Kinsella 0-4 (1 2p), S. Coffey, J. Conlon, K. Curtis, D. Keogan, J. Morris 0-1 each	Croke Park; Attendance: 65,786; Referee: Martin McNally (Monaghan); Man of the Match: Sam Mulroy

2024	Dublin	1-19 – 2-12	Louth	Croke Park; Attendance: 23,113; Referee: Noel Mooney (Cavan)
2024	O'Callaghan 1-4, Costello 6, Fenton 3, Basquel, Bugler, Lahiff, Mannion, Kilkenny & P Small 1	Report	Mulroy 6 (5f), Grimes 4, Keenan & Lennon 1-0, Downey & Durnin 1	Croke Park; Attendance: 23,113; Referee: Noel Mooney (Cavan)

2023	Dublin	5-21 - 0-15	Louth	Croke Park; Attendance: 40,115; Referee: Conor Lane (Cork); Man of the Match: Sean Bugler (St. OP/ER)
2023	Sean Bugler 1-3, Cormac Costello 0-5 (0-3f, 1 '45), Paul Mannion 1-1 (0-1f), Con O'Callaghan 0-4 (0-2m), James McCarthy, Paddy Small, Colm Basquel 1-0 each, Ciaran Kilkenny 0-3, Jack McCaffrey 0-2, John Small, Dean Rock, Sean McMahon 0-1 each	Report	Sam Mulroy 0-10 (0-7f, 1 '45), Conor Grimes 0-2, Ciaran Downey, Liam Jackson, Craig Lennon 0-1 each	Croke Park; Attendance: 40,115; Referee: Conor Lane (Cork); Man of the Match: Sean Bugler (St. OP/ER)

2022	Dublin	5-17 - 1-15	Kildare	Croke Park; Attendance: 38,000 (est.); Referee: Paddy Neilan (Roscommon); Man of the Match: Con O'Callaghan (Cuala)
2022	Con O'Callaghan 1-5 (0-1m), Cormac Costello 2-1, Dean Rock 0-4f, John Small and Ciaran Kilkenny 1-0 each, Brian Fenton 0-3, Lee Gannon 0-2, Niall Scully and Aaron Byrne 0-1 each	Report	Jimmy Hyland 1-4 (0-3f), Ben McCormack 0-5 (0-1m), Kevin Feely 0-2 (0-1m), Kevin Flynn, Paul Cribbin, Darragh Kirwan, Paddy Woodgate (0-1f) 0-1 each	Croke Park; Attendance: 38,000 (est.); Referee: Paddy Neilan (Roscommon); Man of the Match: Con O'Callaghan (Cuala)

2021	Dublin	0-20 - 1-9	Kildare	Croke Park; Attendance: 18,000; Referee: Martin McNally (Monaghan); Man of the Match: Daniel Flynn (Johnstownbridge)
2021	Dean Rock 0-5 (0-3f), Ciaran Kilkenny (0-1m) and Cormac Costello 0-4 each, Niall Scully 0-2 (0-1m), James McCarthy, Brian Howard, Paddy Small, Con O'Callaghan, Ryan Basquel 0-1 each	Report	Daniel Flynn 1-2 (0-1m), Jimmy Hyland 0-4 (0-1m, 0-1f), Neil Flynn, Alex Beirne, Brian McLoughlin 0-1 each	Croke Park; Attendance: 18,000; Referee: Martin McNally (Monaghan); Man of the Match: Daniel Flynn (Johnstownbridge)

2020	Dublin	3–21 – 0–9	Meath	Croke Park; Referee: Derek O'Mahoney (Tipperary); Man of the Match: Dean Rock (Ballymun Kickhams)
2020	Dean Rock 1–7 (0-5f, 1 '45), Sean Bugler 1–2, Niall Scully 1–1, Ciaran Kilkenny 0–4, Paddy Small 0–3 (0-2m), Con O'Callaghan 0–2, John Small and Paul Mannion (0-1f) 0–1 each	Report	Jordan Morris 0–4 (0-1f), Bryan Menton, Cillian O'Sulivan, Thomas O'Reilly (0-1f), Joey Wallace, Jason Scully 0–1 each	Croke Park; Referee: Derek O'Mahoney (Tipperary); Man of the Match: Dean Rock (Ballymun Kickhams)

2019	Dublin	1–17 – 0–4	Meath	Croke Park; Attendance: 47,027; Referee: Sean Hurson (Tyrone); Man of the Match: Paul Mannion (Kilmacud Crokes)
2019	Dean Rock 0–4 (0-1f), Con O'Callaghan 1–0, Cormac Costello (0-2f, 1 '45) and Paul Mannion 0–3 each, Jack McCaffrey 0–2, Philly McMahon, Brian Fenton, Brian Howard, Ciaran Kilkenny, Paddy Andrews 0–1 each	Report	Michael Newman 0–3 and Bryan Menton 0–1	Croke Park; Attendance: 47,027; Referee: Sean Hurson (Tyrone); Man of the Match: Paul Mannion (Kilmacud Crokes)

2018	Dublin	1–25 – 0–10	Laois	Croke Park; Attendance: 41,728; Referee: Barry Cassidy (Derry); Man of the Match: Ciaran Kilkenny (Castleknock)
2018	Dean Rock 0–8 (0-5f, 1 '45), Ciaran Kilkenny 1–4, Cormac Costello 0–4, Brian Fenton, Con O'Callaghan, Paddy Andrews 0–2 each, Brian Howard, Niall Scully, Paul Mannion 0–1 each	Report	Donie Kingston 0–4 (0-2f), Alan Farrell and Gary Walsh 0–2 each, Kieran Lillis and Evan O'Carroll 0–1 each	Croke Park; Attendance: 41,728; Referee: Barry Cassidy (Derry); Man of the Match: Ciaran Kilkenny (Castleknock)

2017	Dublin	2–23 – 1–17	Kildare	Croke Park; Attendance: 66,734; Referee: Anthony Nolan (Wicklow); Man of the Match: Con O'Callaghan (Cuala)
2017	Con O'Callaghan 0-12 (0-6f), Bernard Brogan 0-5, James McCarthy and Dean Rock 1-0 each, Ciaran Kilkenny 0-2, Paul Mannion, Paddy Andrews, Shane B. Carthy, Brian Howard 0-1 each	Report	Paddy Brophy 1-3 (0-1f), Kevin Feely 0-5 (0-4f), Daniel Flynn and Cathal McNally 0-2 each, Johnny Byrne, Keith Cribbin, Niall Kelly, David Slattery, Fionn Dowling 0-1 each	Croke Park; Attendance: 66,734; Referee: Anthony Nolan (Wicklow); Man of the Match: Con O'Callaghan (Cuala)

2016	Dublin	2–19 – 0–10	Westmeath	Croke Park; Attendance: 38,885; Referee: Fergal Kelly (Longford); Man of the Match: Bernard Brogan (St. OP/ER)
2016	Dean Rock 0-8f, Bernard Brogan 1–4, Kevin McManamon 1–2, Paddy Andrews 0–2, John Small, Paul Flynn, Diarmuid Connolly 0–1 each	Report	John Heslin 0–6 (0-5f), Ger Egan 0–2, Denis Corroon, Callum McCormack 0–1 each	Croke Park; Attendance: 38,885; Referee: Fergal Kelly (Longford); Man of the Match: Bernard Brogan (St. OP/ER)

2015	Dublin	2–13 – 0–6	Westmeath	Croke Park; Attendance: 47,840; Referee: Joe McQuillan (Cavan); Man of the Match: Diarmuid Connolly (St Vincents)
2015	Bernard Brogan 1-1, Jack McCaffrey 1-0, Ciaran Kilkenny and Diarmuid Connolly 0-3 each, Dean Rock 0-2f, Philly McMahon, James McCarthy, Michael Darragh Macauley, Alan Brogan 0-1 each.	Report	John Heslin 0-3 (0-2f), Kieran Martin 0-2, Francis Boyle 0-1	Croke Park; Attendance: 47,840; Referee: Joe McQuillan (Cavan); Man of the Match: Diarmuid Connolly (St Vincents)

2014	Dublin	3–20 – 1–10	Meath	Croke Park; Attendance: 62,660; Referee: Padraig Hughes (Armagh); Man of the Match: Kevin McManamon (St. Judes)
2014	Bernard Brogan 1–6 (0-4f), Kevin McManamon 1–5, Eoghan O’Gara 1–1, Diarmuid Connolly, Stephen Cluxton (1 '45), Cian O’Sullivan, Alan Brogan, Jack McCaffrey, Paul Flynn, Dean Rock, Cormac Costello 0–1 each	Report	Mickey Newman 1–2 (0-1f), Shane O’Rourke (0-2f), Andy Tormey, Stephen Bray 0–2 each, Damien Carroll and David Bray 0–1 each	Croke Park; Attendance: 62,660; Referee: Padraig Hughes (Armagh); Man of the Match: Kevin McManamon (St. Judes)

2013	Dublin	2–15 – 0–14	Meath	Croke Park; Attendance: 54,485; Referee: Eddie Kinsella (Laois); Man of the Match: Ciaran Kilkenny (Castleknock)
2013	Paul Mannion 1-4 (0-2f), Paul Flynn 1-1, Stephen Cluxton (0-2f, 1 '45) and Ciaran Kilkenny 0-3 each, Dean Rock 0-2 (0-1f), Diarmuid Connolly and Bernard Brogan (0-1f) 0-1 each	Report	Michael Newman 0-8 (0-6f), Stephen Bray and Eamonn Wallace 0-2 each, Brian Meade and Joe Sheridan 0-1 each	Croke Park; Attendance: 54,485; Referee: Eddie Kinsella (Laois); Man of the Match: Ciaran Kilkenny (Castleknock)

2012	Dublin	2–13 – 1–13	Meath	Croke Park; Attendance: 69,657; Referee: Marty Duffy (Sligo); Man of the Match: Bernard Brogan (St. OP/ER)
2012	Bernard Brogan 1–7 (0-4f), Denis Bastick 1–0, Alan Brogan and Eoghan O'Gara 0–2 each, James McCarthy and Kevin McManamon 0–1 each	Report	Brian Farrell 0–7 (0-6f), Jamie Queeney 1–0, Graham Reilly 0–3, Donnacha Tobin, Joe Sheridan (1 '45), Stephen Bray 0–1 each	Croke Park; Attendance: 69,657; Referee: Marty Duffy (Sligo); Man of the Match: Bernard Brogan (St. OP/ER)

2011	Dublin	2–12 – 1–12	Wexford	Croke Park; Attendance: 43,983; Referee: Joe McQuillan (Cavan); Man of the Match: Alan Brogan (St. OP/ER)
2011	James McCarthy 1–0, Alan Brogan and Bernard Brogan (0-1f) 0–3 each, Stephen Cluxton (1 '45), Denis Bastick, Paul Flynn, Bryan Cullen, Kevin McManamon, Ross McConnell 0–1 each, Graeme Molloy 1–0 o.g.	Report	Ben Brosnan 0–9 (0-5f, 2 '45), Redmond Barry 1–0, Ciaran Lyng 0–2, Adrian Flynn 0–1	Croke Park; Attendance: 43,983; Referee: Joe McQuillan (Cavan); Man of the Match: Alan Brogan (St. OP/ER)

2010	Meath	1–12 – 1–10	Louth	Croke Park; Attendance: 48,875; Referee: Martin Sludden (Tyrone); Man of the Match: Eamonn McAuley (Na Piarsaigh)
2010	Graham Reilly and Cian Ward (0-4f) 0–4 each, Joe Sheridan 1–0, Stephen Bray 0–2, Anthony Moyles and Nigel Crawford 0–1 each	Report	JP Rooney 1–1, Brian White 0–4 (0-1f), Colm Judge 0–2 (0-1f), Paddy Keenan, Andy McDonnell, Adrian Reid 0–1 each	Croke Park; Attendance: 48,875; Referee: Martin Sludden (Tyrone); Man of the Match: Eamonn McAuley (Na Piarsaigh)

2009	Dublin	2–15 – 0–18	Kildare	Croke Park; Attendance: 74,573; Referee: Pat McEnaney (Monaghan)
2009	Bernard Brogan 0–7 (0-2f), Barry Cahill and Jason Sherlock 1–1 each, Conal Keaney 0–3 (0-2f), Alan Brogan 0–2, Ciaran Whelan 0–1	Report	Ken Donnelly 0–3, Mikey Conway, James Kavanagh, Padraig O'Neill, Ronan Sweeney, Alan Smith, John Doyle 0–2 each, Dermot Earley, Robert Kelly, Eamon Callaghan 0–1 each	Croke Park; Attendance: 74,573; Referee: Pat McEnaney (Monaghan)

2008	Dublin	3–23 – 0–9	Wexford	Croke Park; Attendance: 80,112; Referee: Gearoid Ó Conamha (Galway)
2008	Alan Brogan 1–4 (1 '45), Diarmuid Connolly 1–3, Conal Keaney 0–6 (0-4f), Tomás Quinn 0-4f, Mark Vaughan 1–0, Jason Sherlock 0–3, Collie Moran, Barry Cahill, Shane Ryan 0–1 each	Report	Ciarán Lyng 0-4f, Eric Bradley and Matty Forde 0–2 each, Redmond Barry 0–1	Croke Park; Attendance: 80,112; Referee: Gearoid Ó Conamha (Galway)

2007	Dublin	3–14 – 1–14	Laois	Croke Park; Attendance: 81,394; Referee: Michael Hughes (Tyrone)
2007	Mark Vaughan 1–6 (0-5f), Alan Brogan and Bernard Brogan 1–1 each, Ciaran Whelan and Conal Keaney (0-1f) 0–2 each, Tomás Quinn and Ger Brennan 0–1 each	Report	MJ Tierney 0–7 (0-6f, 1 '45), Ross Munnelly 1–1, Colm Parkinson 0–3, Brian McCormack, Peter O'Leary, Billy Sheehan 0–1 each	Croke Park; Attendance: 81,394; Referee: Michael Hughes (Tyrone)

2006	Dublin	1–15 – 0–9	Offaly	Croke Park; Attendance: 81,754; Referee: Marty Duffy (Sligo)
2006	Tomás Quinn 0–7 (0-3f), Jason Sherlock 1–1, Alan Brogan 0–4, Conal Keaney 0–3 (0-1f)	Report	Niall McNamee 0–4 (0-1f), Ciaran McManus (0-2f) and Thomas Deehan 0–2 each, Alan McNamee 0–1	Croke Park; Attendance: 81,754; Referee: Marty Duffy (Sligo)

2005	Dublin	0–14 – 0–13	Laois	Croke Park; Attendance: 81,025; Referee: Joe McQuillan (Cavan); Man of the Match: Bryan Cullen (Skerries Harps)
2005	Tomás Quinn 0–4 (0-3f, 1 '45), Bryan Cullen 0–3, Jason Sherlock 0–2, Stephen O'Shaughnessy, Ciaran Whelan, Collie Moran, Alan Brogan, Conal Keaney 0–1 each	Report	Ross Munnelly 0–5 (0-2f), Chris Conway 0–4 (0-2f), Noel Garvan and Donie Brennan 0–2 each	Croke Park; Attendance: 81,025; Referee: Joe McQuillan (Cavan); Man of the Match: Bryan Cullen (Skerries Harps)

2004	Westmeath	0–13 – 0–13	Laois	Croke Park; Attendance: 56,000; Referee: Pat McEnaney (Monaghan)
2004	Denis Glennon 0–5, Dessie Dolan 0–4 (0-3f), Fergal Wilson (0-2f) and Joe Fallon 0–2 each	Report	Brian McDonald 0–4 (0-2f), Ross Munnelly, Chris Conway, Shane Cooke (0-2f) 0–2 each, Darren Rooney, Kevin Fitzpatrick, Mick Lawlor 0–1 each	Croke Park; Attendance: 56,000; Referee: Pat McEnaney (Monaghan)

2004 Replay	Westmeath	0–12 – 0–10	Laois	Croke Park; Attendance: 38,300; Referee: Mick Monahan (Kildare)
2004 Replay	Alan Mangan 0–4, Dessie Dolan 0–3 (0-1f), Denis Glennon 0–2, Michael Ennis, Brian Morley, Fergal Wilson (0-1f) 0–1 each	Report	Ross Munnelly 0-3f, Kevin Fitzpatrick 0–2, Tom Kelly, Padraig Clancy, Brian McDonald, Donie Brennan, Colm Parkinson 0–1 each	Croke Park; Attendance: 38,300; Referee: Mick Monahan (Kildare)

2003	Laois	2–13 – 1–13	Kildare	Croke Park; Attendance: 61,786; Referee: Seamus McCormack (Meath)
2003	Brian McDonald 1–2, Ross Munnelly 1–1, Ian Fitzgerald 0–4, Tom Kelly 0–2, Padraig Clancy, Gary Kavanagh, Barry Brennan, Donal Miller 0–1 each	Report	John Doyle 0–5 (0-4f), Patrick Murray 0–4 (0-3f), Ronan Sweeney 1–0 pen, Stuart McKenzie-Smith 0–2, Glenn Ryan and Padraig Brennan 0–1 each	Croke Park; Attendance: 61,786; Referee: Seamus McCormack (Meath)

2002	Dublin	2–13 – 2–11	Kildare	Croke Park; Attendance: 78,033; Referee: Michael Collins (Cork)
2002	Ray Cosgrove 1–4 (0-2f), Alan Brogan 1–2, John McNally 0–3 (1 '45), Senan Connell 0–2, Paddy Christie and Ciaran Whelan 0–1	Report	Tadhg Fennin 2–2, John Doyle 0–7 (0-5f), Karl O'Dwyer and Patrick Murray 0–1 each	Croke Park; Attendance: 78,033; Referee: Michael Collins (Cork)

2001	Meath	2–11 – 0–14	Dublin	Croke Park; Attendance: 66,275; Referee: Michael Curley (Galway)
2001	Richie Kealy 1–1, Graham Geraghty 1–0, Evan Kelly and Trevor Giles (1 '45) 0–3 each, Donal Curtis 0–2, Ollie Murphy and Ray Magee 0–1 each	Report	Collie Moran 0–4, Ciaran Whelan, Dessie Farrell, Wayne McCarthy (0-3f) 0–3 each, Jason Sherlock 0–1	Croke Park; Attendance: 66,275; Referee: Michael Curley (Galway)

2000	Kildare	0–14 – 0–14	Dublin	Croke Park; Attendance: 50,066; Referee: Paddy Russell (Tipperary)
2000	Padraig Brennan 0–5 (0-4f), John Doyle (0-2f) and Tadhg Fennin 0–3 each, Anthony Rainbow, Martin Lynch, Ronan Sweeney 0–1 each	Report	Brian Stynes, Collie Moran, Jason Sherlock 0–3 each, Johnny Magee, Ciaran Whelan, Dessie Farrell, Jim Gavin (0-1f), Vinnie Murphy 0–1 each	Croke Park; Attendance: 50,066; Referee: Paddy Russell (Tipperary)

2000 Replay	Kildare	2–11 – 0–12	Dublin	Croke Park; Attendance: 51,156; Referee: Pat McEnaney (Monaghan)
2000 Replay	Padraig Brennan 0–5 (0-4f), Dermot Earley and Tadhg Fennin 1–0 each, Willie McCreery and John Doyle (0-2f) 0–2 each, Martin Lynch and Bryan Murphy 0–1 each	Report	Collie Moran 0–3, Ciaran Whelan, Jim Gavin (0-2f), Dessie Farrell 0–2 each, Brian Stynes (0-1f), Jason Sherlock, Vinnie Murphy (0-1f) 0–1 each	Croke Park; Attendance: 51,156; Referee: Pat McEnaney (Monaghan)

1999	Meath	1–14 – 0–12	Dublin	Croke Park; Attendance: 56,315; Referee: Michael Curley (Galway)
1999	Ollie Murphy 1–5, Trevor Giles 0–5 (0-4f), Graham Geraghty 0–2, Hank Traynor and Nigel Nestor 0–1 each	Report	Declan Darcy 0-6f, Jim Gavin 0–5 (0-3f), Ciaran Whelan 0–1	Croke Park; Attendance: 56,315; Referee: Michael Curley (Galway)

1998	Kildare	1–12 – 0–10	Meath	Croke Park; Attendance: 62,504; Referee: John Bannon (Longford)
1998	Padraig Graven 0-4f, Bryan Murphy 1–0, Willie McCreery, Eddie McCormack, Karl O'Dwyer 0–2 each, Anthony Rainbow and Declan Kerrigan 0–1 each	Report	Trevor Giles (0-2f) and Ray Magee (0-2f) 0–3 each, John McDermott, Tommy Dowd, Ollie Murphy, Jody Devine 0–1 each	Croke Park; Attendance: 62,504; Referee: John Bannon (Longford)

1997	Offaly	3–17 – 1–15	Meath	Croke Park; Attendance: 46,047; Referee: Brian White (Wexford); Man of the Match: Vinny Claffey (Doon)
1997	Roy Malone 2–0, Vinny Claffey 1–5, Colm Quinn 0–4, David Reynolds (0-1f) and Peter Brady 0–3 each, Ciaran McManus (0-1f) and Ronan Mooney 0–1 each		Brendan Reilly 0–7 (0-3f, 1 '45), Jimmy McGuinness 1–2, Trevor Giles and Ollie Murphy 0–3 each	Croke Park; Attendance: 46,047; Referee: Brian White (Wexford); Man of the Match: Vinny Claffey (Doon)

1996	Meath	0–10 – 0–8	Dublin	Croke Park; Attendance: 55,182; Referee: Brian White (Wexford); Man of the Match: John McDermott (Skryne)
1996	Trevor Giles 0–4 (0-3f), Tommy Dowd and Brendan Reilly 0–2 each, Evan Kelly and Barry Callaghan 0–1 each		Charlie Redmond 0–4 (1f, 1'45), Ciaran Whelan 0–2, Eamon Heery and Brian Stynes 0–1 each	Croke Park; Attendance: 55,182; Referee: Brian White (Wexford); Man of the Match: John McDermott (Skryne)

1995	Dublin	1–18 – 1–8	Meath	Croke Park; Attendance: 63,000; Referee: Pat Casserly (Westmeath)
1995	Charlie Redmond 0–7 (0-6f), Paul Clarke 1–2, Dessie Farrell 0–3 (0-1f), Paul Curran and Jason Sherlock 0–2 each, Jim Gavin and Mick Galvin 0–1 each	Report	Evan Kelly 1–0, Trevor Giles 0-3f, Colm O'Rourke 0–2 (0-1f), Graham Geraghty, Jody Devine, Brian Stafford (0-1f) 0–1 each	Croke Park; Attendance: 63,000; Referee: Pat Casserly (Westmeath)

1994	Dublin	1–09 – 1–08	Meath	Croke Park; Attendance: 50,172; Referee: Brian White (Wexford)
1994	Charlie Redmond 1–4 (0-4f), Brian Stynes 0–2, Niall Guiden, Dessie Farrell, Paul Clarke 0–1 each	Report	Graham Geraghty 1–2, Jimmy McGuinness, Brendan Reilly, Colm O'Rourke, Bernard Flynn, Tommy Dowd, PJ Gillic 0–1 each	Croke Park; Attendance: 50,172; Referee: Brian White (Wexford)

1993	Dublin	0–11 – 0–7	Kildare	Croke Park; Attendance: 59,696; Referee: Tommy McDermott (Cavan); Man of the Match: Jack Sheedy (Lucan Sarsfields)
1993	Charlie Redmond 0–5 (0-3f, 1 '45), Pat Gilroy, Dessie Farrell, Paul Bealin, Vinnie Murphy, Mick Galvin, Johnny Barr 0–1 each	Report	Niall Buckley 0-4f, Sean McGovern, Johnny McDonald, Declan Kerrigan 0–1 each	Croke Park; Attendance: 59,696; Referee: Tommy McDermott (Cavan); Man of the Match: Jack Sheedy (Lucan Sarsfields)

1992	Dublin	1–13 – 0–10	Kildare	Croke Park; Attendance: 60,271; Referee: Brian White (Wexford); Man of the Match: Keith Barr (Erin's Isle)
1992	Charlie Redmond 0–5 (0-4f,1'45), Keith Barr 1–0, Vinnie Murphy 0–3, Paul Curran, Eamon Heery, Paul Clarke, Dessie Farrell, Mick Galvin 0–1 each	Report	Niall Buckley 0–4 (0-3f), Martin Lynch and Paul McLoughlin 0–2, Brian Fahy and Johnny McDonald 0–1 each	Croke Park; Attendance: 60,271; Referee: Brian White (Wexford); Man of the Match: Keith Barr (Erin's Isle)

1991	Meath	1–11 – 0–8	Laois	Croke Park; Attendance: 28,157; Referee: Tommy Howard (Kildare); Man of the Match: Martin O'Connell (St. Michaels)
1991	Brian Stafford 0–5 (0-4f), David Beggy 1–0, Bernard Flynn 0–3, Colm Coyle 0–2, Colm O'Rourke 0–1		Michael Turley 0–4 (0-3f), Leo Turley 0–2, Pat Roe and Colm Maher 0–1 each	Croke Park; Attendance: 28,157; Referee: Tommy Howard (Kildare); Man of the Match: Martin O'Connell (St. Michaels)

1990	Meath	1–14 – 0–14	Dublin	Croke Park; Attendance: 53,847; Referee: Paddy Collins (Westmeath); Man of the Match: Dave Foran (Thomas Davis)
1990	Brian Stafford 0–8 (0-6f), Colm O'Rourke 1–1, Bernard Flynn 0–2, Martin O'Connell, David Beggy, PJ Gillic 0–1 each	Report	Barney Rock 0-5f, Paul Clarke and Kieran Duff (0-2f) 0–2 each, Keith Barr, Vinnie Murphy, Charlie Redmond, Joe McNally, Leo Close 0–1 each	Croke Park; Attendance: 53,847; Referee: Paddy Collins (Westmeath); Man of the Match: Dave Foran (Thomas Davis)

1989	Dublin	2–12 – 1–10	Meath	Croke Park; Attendance: 56,839; Referee: S Kelly (Carlow)
1989	V Murphy 1-2, K Duff 1-2, B Rock 0-5, P Curran 0-2, J McNally 0-1.		B Stafford 0-5, B Flynn 0-4, M McCabe 1-0, C O'Rourke 0-1.	Croke Park; Attendance: 56,839; Referee: S Kelly (Carlow)

1988	Meath	2–05 – 0–09	Dublin	Croke Park; Attendance: 42,302; Referee: Seamus Aldridge (Kildare)
1988	PJ Gillic 1-3 (0-2f), Mattie McCabe 1-1, Liam Hayes 0-1		Declan Sheehan 0-3 (0-1f), Vinnie Murphy 0-2, Noel McCaffrey, Charlie Redmond (0-1 pen), Barney Rock (0-1f), Mick Galvin 0-1 each	Croke Park; Attendance: 42,302; Referee: Seamus Aldridge (Kildare)

1987	Meath	1–13 – 0–12	Dublin	Croke Park; Attendance: 48,122; Referee: Seamus Aldridge (Kildare)
1987	Brian Stafford 0-6 (0-5f) Mattie McCabe 1-2, Colm O'Rourke and Finian Murtagh 0-2 each, David Beggy 0-1.		Barney Rock 0-4 (0-3f), Noel McCaffrey and Joe McNally 0-2 each, Declan Bolger, Charlie Redmond, Mick Gavin, Anto McCaul 0-1 each	Croke Park; Attendance: 48,122; Referee: Seamus Aldridge (Kildare)

1986	Meath	0–09 – 0–07	Dublin	Croke Park; Attendance: 43,763; Referee: Seamus Aldridge (Kildare)
1986	Finian Murtagh (0-1f) and Colm O'Rourke 0-3 each, Liam Hayes (0-1f), David Beggy, Bernard Flynn (0-1f) 0-1 each		Barney Rock 0-3 (0-2f, 1 '45), Kieran Duff (0-1f) and Charlie Redmond (0-1f) 0-2 each	Croke Park; Attendance: 43,763; Referee: Seamus Aldridge (Kildare)

1985	Dublin	0–10 – 0–04	Laois	Croke Park; Attendance: 33,425; Referee: Paddy Kavanagh (Meath)
1985	Barney Rock 0-6 (0-4f), Anto McCaul 0-2, Jim Ronayne and Tommy Carr 0-1 each		Liam Irwin (0-1f), Willie Brennan, Christy Maguire (0-1f), Gerry Browne 0-1 each	Croke Park; Attendance: 33,425; Referee: Paddy Kavanagh (Meath)

1984	Dublin	2–10 – 1–09	Meath	Croke Park; Attendance: 56,051; Referee: J Gunning (Offaly)
1984	Barney Rock 1-4 (0-3f), Kieran Duff 1-4, Anton O'Toole and Joe McNally 0-1 each		Ben Tansey 1-0, Liam Smith 0-3f, Mattie McCabe 0-2, Martin O'Connell (1 '50), Liam Hayes, Colm O'Rourke, Bernard Flynn 0-1 each	Croke Park; Attendance: 56,051; Referee: J Gunning (Offaly)

1983	Dublin	2–13 – 1–11	Offaly	Croke Park; Attendance: 36,912; Referee: P Collins (Westmeath)
1983	Joe McNally 1-2, Barney Rock 0-5f, John Caffrey 1-0, Tommy Conroy and Kieran Duff 0-2 each, Anton O'Toole and John Kearns 0-1 each		Matt Connor 1-7 (0-6f), Brendan Lowry 0-2, Tomas O'Connor and Martin Fitzpatrick 0-1 each	Croke Park; Attendance: 36,912; Referee: P Collins (Westmeath)

1982	Offaly	1–16 – 1–07	Dublin	Croke Park; Attendance: 32,50; Referee: Paddy Collins (Westmeath)
1982	Séamus Darby 1-3, Gerry Carroll, John Guinan, Matt Connor (0-1f, 1 '50), Liam O'Mahony 0-3 each, Brendan Lowry 0-1		Niall Gaffney 1-1, Barney Rock 0-2, John Kearns 0-2, Anto McCaul 0-1, Kieran Duff 0-1	Croke Park; Attendance: 32,50; Referee: Paddy Collins (Westmeath)

1981	Offaly	1–18 – 3–09	Laois	Croke Park; Attendance: 28,398; Referee: Paddy Collins (Westmeath)
1981	Brendan Lowry 1-4, Matt Connor 0-5 (0-3f), Tomas O'Connor, Pat Fitzgerald, Gerry Carroll, Sean Lowry 0-2 each, Aidan O'Halloran 0-1		Willie Brennan 1-3 (0-2f), Mick Moore 1-2, Tom Prendergast 1-1, John Costello, Eamon Whelan, Declan O'Loughlin 0-1 each	Croke Park; Attendance: 28,398; Referee: Paddy Collins (Westmeath)

1980	Offaly	1–10 – 1–08	Dublin	Croke Park; Attendance: 50,276; Referee: Paddy Kavanagh (Meath)
1980	Matt Connor 1-7 (0-3f), Aiden O'Halloran 0-2, Gerry Carroll 0-1		Bobby Doyle 1-1, Barney Rock 0-3f, Tommy Drumm, Anton O'Toole, David Hickey, John Caffrey 0-1 each	Croke Park; Attendance: 50,276; Referee: Paddy Kavanagh (Meath)

1979	Dublin	1–08 – 0–09	Offaly	Croke Park; Attendance: 52,348; Referee: Paddy Collins (Westmeath)
1979	Bernard Brogan Sr 1-1, Jim Ronayne 0-3, Jimmy Keaveney 0-2f, Bobby Doyle and Mick Hickey (0-1f) each		Sean Lowry 0-6 (0-4f), Kevin Kilmurray 0-2, Matt Connor 0-1	Croke Park; Attendance: 52,348; Referee: Paddy Collins (Westmeath)

1978	Dublin	1–17 – 1–06	Kildare	Croke Park; Attendance: 53,512; Referee: Paddy Collins (Westmeath)
1978	Jimmy Keaveney 0-7 (0-3f, 1 '45), Tony Hanahoe 1-2, Anton O'Toole 0-2, Robbie Kelleher, Brian Mullins, Bernard Brogan Sr, John McCarthy, Padraig Hogan, Paddy Gogarty 0-1 each		Denis Dalton 1-0, Tommy Carew 0-3 (0-2f), Mick Condon 0-2, Pat Dunny 0-1	Croke Park; Attendance: 53,512; Referee: Paddy Collins (Westmeath)

1977	Dublin	1–09 – 0–08	Meath	Croke Park; Attendance: 46,044; Referee: Seamus Aldridge (Kildare)
1977	Jimmy Keaveney 0-6 (0-4f), Anton O'Toole 1-0, Bobby Doyle, John McCarthy, Fran Ryder 0-1 each		Ken Rennicks and Gerry Farrelly (0-2f) 0-2 each, Ollie O'Brien (0-1f), John Gibbons (0-1f), Cormac Rowe, Matt Kerrigan 0-1 each	Croke Park; Attendance: 46,044; Referee: Seamus Aldridge (Kildare)

1976	Dublin	2–08 – 1–09	Meath	Croke Park; Attendance: 38,955; Referee: S Aldridge (Kildare)
1976	Jimmy Keaveny 0-4 (0-1f, 1 '50), Anton O'Toole and Tony Hanahoe 1-0 each, David Hickey 0-2, Bobby Doyle and Paddy Gogarty 0-1 each		Colm O'Rourke 1-2 (0-1f), Gerry Farrelly 0-2f, John Gibbons (0-1f), Mick Ryan, Cormac Rowe, Mattie Kerrigan, Ollie O'Brien (0-1f) 0-1 each	Croke Park; Attendance: 38,955; Referee: S Aldridge (Kildare)

1975	Dublin	3–13 – 0–08	Kildare	Croke Park; Attendance: 44,182; Referee: Brendan Hayden (Carlow)
1975	Brian Mullins 2–0, David Hickey 1–2, Paddy Gogarty 0–4, Bobby Doyle and Jimmy Keaveney (0-1f) 0–2 each, Bernard Brogan Sr, Tony Hanahoe, Anton O'Toole 0–1 each		Jack Donnelly 0-3f, Pat Dunny 0–2, Jack Balfe (1 '50), Tommy Carew, Ray O'Sullivan 0–1	Croke Park; Attendance: 44,182; Referee: Brendan Hayden (Carlow)

1974	Dublin	1–14 – 1–09	Meath	Croke Park; Attendance: 37,067; Referee: P Collins (Westmeath)
1974	J Keaveney 1–8, A O'Toole 0–3, D Hickey 0–2, S Rooney 0–1.		M Fay 1–1, O O'Brien 0–3, K Rennicks 0–2, M Kerrigan 0–2, G Farrelly 0–1.	Croke Park; Attendance: 37,067; Referee: P Collins (Westmeath)

1973

Offaly	3–21 – 2–12	Meath

Croke Park

1972

Offaly	1–18 – 2–08	Kildare

Croke Park

1971

Offaly	2–14 – 0–06	Kildare

Croke Park

1970

Meath	2–22 – 5–12	Offaly

Croke Park

1969

Offaly	3–07 – 1–08	Kildare

Croke Park

1968

Longford	3–09 – 1–04	Laois

Croke Park

1967

Meath	0–08 – 0–06	Offaly

Croke Park

1966

Meath	1–09 – 1–08	Kildare

Croke Park

1965

Dublin	3–06 – 0–09	Longford

Croke Park

1964

Meath	2–12 – 1–07	Dublin

Croke Park

1963

Dublin	2–11 – 2–09	Laois

Croke Park

1962

Dublin	2–08 – 1–07	Offaly

Croke Park

1961

Offaly	1–13 – 1–08	Dublin

O'Moore Park, Portlaoise
Attendance: 26,826

1960

Offaly	0–10 – 1–06	Louth

Croke Park

1959

Dublin	1–18 – 2–08	Laois

Croke Park

1958

Dublin	1–11 – 1–06	Louth

Croke Park

1957

Louth	2–09 – 1–07	Dublin

Croke Park

1956

Kildare	2–11 – 1–08	Wexford

Croke Park

1955

Dublin	5–12 – 0–07	Meath

Croke Park

1954

Meath	4–07 – 2–10	Offaly

Croke Park

1953

Louth	1–07 – 0–07	Wexford

Croke Park

1952

Meath	1–06 – 0–08	Louth

Croke Park

1951

Meath	4–09 – 0–03	Laois

Croke Park

1950

Louth	1–03 – 1–03	Meath

Croke Park

1950 Replay

Louth	3–05 – 0–13	Meath

Croke Park

1949

Meath	4–05 – 0–06	Westmeath

Croke Park

1948

Louth	2–10 – 2–05	Wexford

Croke Park

1947

Meath	3–07 – 1–07	Laois

Croke Park

1946

Laois	0–11 – 1–06	Kildare

Croke Park
Attendance: 27,353

1945

Wexford	1–09 – 1–04	Offaly

O'Moore Park
Attendance: 9,873

1944

Carlow	2–06 – 1–06	Dublin

Athy

1943

Louth	3–16 – 2–04	Laois

Croke Park

1942

Dublin	0–08 – 0–06	Carlow

Croke Park

1941

Dublin	4–06 – 1–04	Carlow

Croke Park

1940

Meath	2–07 – 1–07	Laois

Croke Park

1939

Meath	2–07 – 2–03	Wexford

Croke Park

1938

Laois	2–08 – 1–03	Kildare

Croke Park

1937

Laois	0–12 – 0–04	Louth

Croke Park
Attendance: 15,317

1936

Laois	3–03 – 0–08	Kildare

Croke Park
Attendance: 13,567

1935

Kildare	0–08 – 0–06	Louth

Croke Park

1934

Dublin	1–02 – 0–05	Louth

Croke Park

1934 Replay

Dublin	3–02 – 2–05	Louth

Croke Park

1934 Second Replay

Dublin	2–09 – 1–10	Louth

Croke Park

1933

Dublin	0–09 – 1–04	Wexford

Croke Park

1932

Dublin	0–08 – 1–05	Wexford

Croke Park

1932 Replay

Dublin	4–06 – 1–05	Wexford

Croke Park

1931

Kildare	2–09 – 1–06	Westmeath

Croke Park

1930

Kildare	0–06 – 1–03	Meath

Croke Park

1930 Replay

Kildare	2–06 – 1–02	Meath

Croke Park

1929

Kildare	2–03 – 0–06	Laois

Croke Park

1928

Kildare	0–10 – 1–06	Dublin

Croke Park

1927

Kildare	0–05 – 0–03	Dublin

Croke Park

1926

Kildare	2–08 – 1–05	Wexford

Croke Park

1925

Wexford	2–07 – 0–03	Kildare

Croke Park

1924

Dublin	1–04 – 1–04	Wexford

Croke Park

1924 Replay

Dublin	3–05 – 2–03	Wexford

Croke Park

1923

Dublin	3–05 – 0–00	Meath

Croke Park

1922

Dublin	1–07 – 0–02	Kilkenny

Croke Park

1921

Dublin	0–06 – 1–03	Kildare

Croke Park

1921 Replay

Dublin	3–03 – 1–02	Kildare

Croke Park

1920

Dublin	1–03 – 0–03	Kildare

Croke Park

1919

Kildare	1–03 – 1–02	Dublin

Croke Park

1918

Wexford	2–05 – 1–04	Louth

Croke Park

1917

Wexford	1–03 – 1–01	Dublin

Croke Park

1916

Wexford	1–07 – 1–00	Kildare

Croke Park

1915

Wexford	2–02 – 2–02	Dublin

Croke Park

1915 Replay

Wexford	2–05 – 1–04	Dublin

Croke Park

1914

Wexford	3–06 – 0–01	Louth

Croke Park

1913

Wexford	2–03 – 2–02	Louth

Croke Park

1912

Louth	1–02 – 1–01	Dublin

Croke Park

1911

Kilkenny	2–04 – 1–01	Meath

Inchicore

1910

Louth	0–03 – 0–00	Dublin

Croke Park

1909

Louth	2–09 – 0–04	Kilkenny

Croke Park

1908

Dublin	1–07 – 0–03	Kildare

Croke Park

1907

Dublin	1–11 – 0–04	Offaly

Croke Park

1906

Dublin	1–09 – 0–08	Kildare

Croke Park

1905

Kildare	0–12 – 1–07	Louth

Croke Park

1904

Dublin	0–05 – 0–01	Kilkenny

Croke Park

1903

Kildare	1–02 – 0–05	Kilkenny

Croke Park

1903 Replay (disputed)

Kildare	1–06 – 1–05	Kilkenny

Croke Park

1903 Second Replay

Kildare	0–09 – 0–01	Kilkenny

Croke Park

1902 (Unfinished)

Dublin	2–04 – 0–02	Wexford

Croke Park

1902

Dublin	1–05 – 0–05	Wexford

Croke Park

1901

Dublin	1–09 – 0–01	Wexford

Kilkenny

1900

Kilkenny	0–12 – 0–02	Louth

Inchicore

1899

Dublin	1–07 – 0–03	Wexford

Jones Road

1898

Dublin	2–06 – 0–00	Wexford

Jones Road

1897

Dublin	1–09 – 0–03	Wicklow

Jones Road

1896

Dublin	2–04 – 1–05	Meath

Jones Road

1895

Meath	0–06 – 0–02	Dublin

Jones Road

1894

Dublin	0–04 – 0–04	Meath

1894 Replay

Dublin	0–02 – 0–02	Meath

1894 Second Replay

Dublin	1–08 – 1–02	Meath

1893 (unfinish, Wexford awarded title)

Wexford	0–01 – 0–05	Kilkenny

1892

Dublin	w/o – scr.	Louth

Clonturk

1891

Dublin	w/o – scr.	Kildare

Clonturk

1890

Wexford	1–03 – 1–02	Dublin

1889

Laois	0–03 – 0–02	Louth

Inchicore

1888

Kilkenny	1–04 – 0–02	Wexford

Inchicore

== Team records and statistics ==
=== Roll of honour ===
==== Legend ====
- Golden background – Leinster SFC winner or runner-up also won the All-Ireland SFC that year.

==== Performance by team ====
County team	Title(s)	Runner-up	Winning years	Losing years
Dublin	63	24	1891, 1892, 1894, 1896, 1897, 1898, 1899, 1901, 1902, 1904, 1906, 1907, 1908, 1920, 1921, 1922, 1923, 1924, 1932, 1933, 1934, 1941, 1942, 1955, 1958, 1959, 1962, 1963, 1965, 1974, 1975, 1976, 1977, 1978, 1979, 1983, 1984, 1985, 1989, 1992, 1993, 1994, 1995, 2002, 2005, 2006, 2007, 2008, 2009, 2011, 2012, 2013, 2014, 2015, 2016, 2017, 2018, 2019, 2020, 2021, 2022, 2023, 2024	1890, 1895, 1910, 1912, 1915, 1917, 1919, 1927, 1928, 1944, 1957, 1961, 1964, 1980, 1982, 1986, 1987, 1988, 1990, 1996, 1999, 2000, 2001, 2026
Meath	21	23	1895, 1939, 1940, 1947, 1949, 1951, 1952, 1954, 1964, 1966, 1967, 1970, 1986, 1987, 1988, 1990, 1991, 1996, 1999, 2001, 2010	1894, 1896, 1911, 1923, 1930, 1950, 1955, 1973, 1974, 1976, 1977, 1984, 1989, 1994, 1995, 1997, 1998, 2012, 2013, 2014, 2019, 2020, 2025
Kildare	13	23	1903, 1905, 1919, 1926, 1927, 1928, 1929, 1930, 1931, 1935, 1956, 1998, 2000	1891, 1906, 1908, 1916, 1920, 1921, 1925, 1936, 1938, 1946, 1966, 1969, 1971, 1975, 1978, 1992, 1993, 2002, 2003, 2009, 2017, 2021, 2022
Wexford	10	16	1890, 1893, 1913, 1914, 1915, 1916, 1917, 1918, 1925, 1945	1888, 1897, 1898, 1899, 1901, 1902, 1924, 1926, 1932, 1933, 1939, 1948, 1953, 1956, 2008, 2011
Offaly	10	9	1960, 1961, 1969, 1971, 1972, 1973, 1980, 1981, 1982, 1997	1907, 1945, 1954, 1962, 1967, 1970, 1979, 1983, 2006
Louth	9	16	1909, 1910, 1912, 1943, 1948, 1950, 1953, 1957, 2025	1889, 1892, 1900, 1905, 1913, 1914, 1918, 1934, 1935, 1937, 1952, 1958, 1960, 2010, 2023, 2024
Laois	6	15	1889, 1936, 1937, 1938, 1946, 2003	1929, 1940, 1943, 1947, 1951, 1959, 1963, 1968, 1981, 1985, 1991, 2004, 2005, 2007, 2018
Kilkenny	3	5	1888, 1900, 1911	1893, 1903, 1904, 1909, 1922
Westmeath	2	4	2004, 2026	1931, 1949, 2015, 2016
Carlow	1	2	1944	1941, 1942
Longford	1	1	1968	1965
Wicklow	0	1	—N/a	1897

=== Team progress: 2001–2019 ===
Below is a record of each county's performance following the introduction of the qualifier system to the All-Ireland series in 2001. Before 2001 only the Leinster SFC title winner contested the All-Ireland SFC. Qualifiers did not occur from 2020–2021 due to the impact of the COVID-19 pandemic on Gaelic games. The qualifiers have since been replaced by a revamped All Ireland format made up of the 16 teams top teams and the Tailteann cup for the lower 16 teams.

==== Key ====
Winner
Finalist
Semi-finalist
Quarter-finalist / Super 8s
Qualifier Rounds 1–4 / Tommy Murphy Cup

Championship	2001	2002	2003	2004	2005	2006	2007	2008	2009	2010	2011	2012	2013	2014	2015	2016	2017	2018	2019
Carlow	Q2	Q1	Q2	Q1	Q2	Q1	TM	TM	Q1	Q1	Q2	Q1	Q1	Q2	Q1	Q2	Q3	Q1	Q1
Dublin	QF	SF	Q3	QF	QF	SF	SF	QF	QF	SF	W	SF	W	SF	W	W	W	W	W
Kildare	Q3	Q4	Q4	Q1	Q2	Q2	Q2	QF	QF	SF	QF	QF	Q3	Q4	QF	Q3	Q4	S8s	Q3
Laois	Q3	Q3	QF	Q4	QF	QF	Q4	Q3	Q2	Q1	Q2	QF	Q4	Q3	Q1	Q2	Q2	Q4	Q4
Longford	Q1	Q2	Q1	Q3	Q1	Q4	Q2	Q1	Q2	Q2	Q2	Q2	Q2	Q2	Q3	Q3	Q2	Q2	Q1
Louth	Q3	Q2	Q1	Q2	Q3	Q1	Q3	Q1	Q1	Q4	Q1	Q1	Q2	Q1	Q2	Q1	Q1	Q2	Q1
Meath	F	Q4	Q3	Q2	Q3	Q3	SF	Q1	SF	QF	Q3	Q4	Q4	Q4	Q2	Q2	Q3	Q1	S8s
Offaly	Q2	Q2	Q3	Q2	Q1	Q4	TM	Q1	Q1	Q3	Q2	Q1	Q1	Q1	Q2	Q2	Q1	Q2	Q3
Westmeath	QF	Q2	Q1	QF	Q2	QF	Q2	Q2	Q2	Q2	Q1	Q2	Q1	Q1	Q4	Q4	Q2	Q1	Q3
Wexford	Q1	Q1	Q1	Q3	Q2	Q3	Q1	SF	Q2	Q3	Q4	Q2	Q3	Q2	Q2	Q1	Q2	Q1	Q1
Wicklow	Q2	Q2	Q1	Q1	Q1	Q1	TM	TM	Q4	Q1	Q2	Q2	Q1	Q2	Q1	Q1	Q1	Q1	Q1

=== Team Results This Decade ===
Legend

- 1st – Winner
- 2nd – Runner-up
- SF/QF/PR – Semi-finalist / Quarter-finalist / Preliminary round exit

For each year, the number of competing teams is shown (in brackets).

Team	2022 (11)	2023 (11)	2024 (11)	2025 (11)	2026 (11)	Years
Carlow	PR	PR	PR	PR	PR	3
Dublin	1st	1st	1st	SF	2nd	3
Kildare	2nd	SF	SF	SF	SF	3
Laois	PR	QF	QF	QF	QF	3
Longford	QF	PR	PR	PR	PR	3
Louth	QF	2nd	2nd	1st	SF	3
Meath	SF	QF	QF	2nd	QF	3
Offaly	PR	SF	SF	QF	PR	3
Westmeath	SF	QF	PR	QF	1st	3
Wexford	QF	PR	QF	PR	QF	3
Wicklow	QF	QF	QF	QF	QF	3

=== Most recent championship meetings ===
	Car	Dub	Kil	Lao	Lon	Lou	Mea	Off	Wes	Wex	Wic
Carlow	—N/a					2022	2025			2024	2026
Dublin		—N/a	2023	2023		2026	2025	2024	2026	2022	2026
Kildare		2023	—N/a	2026		2025			2026		2024
Laois				—N/a		2025		2026		2025	2022
Longford					—N/a		2024	2023	2026		2025
Louth						—N/a	2025	2023	2023	2026	
Meath							—N/a	2025	2026		2022
Offaly								—N/a		2022	
Westmeath									—N/a		2024
Wexford										—N/a	
Wicklow											—N/a

=== Titles by decade ===
The most successful team of each decade, judged by number of Leinster SFC titles, is as follows:

- 1880s: 1 each for Kilkenny (1888) and Laois (1889)
- 1890s: 7 for Dublin (1891-92-94-96-97-98-99)
- 1900s: 6 for Dublin (1901-02-04-06-07-08)
- 1910s: 6 for Wexford (1913–14-15-16-17-18)
- 1920s: 5 for Dublin (1920-21-22-23-24)
- 1930s: 3 each for Kildare (1930-31-35), Dublin (1932-33-34) and Laois (1936-37-38)
- 1940s: 3 for Meath (1940-47-49)
- 1950s: 3 each for Louth (1950-53-57), Meath (1951-52-54) and Dublin (1955-58-59)
- 1960s: 3 each for Offaly (1960-61-69), Dublin (1962-63-65) and Meath (1964-66-67)
- 1970s: 6 for Dublin (1974-75-76-77-78-79)
- 1980s: 4 for Dublin (1983-84-85-89)
- 1990s: 4 each for Meath (1990-91-96-99) and Dublin (1992-93-94-95)
- 2000s: 6 for Dublin (2002-05-06-07-08-09)
- 2010s: 9 for Dublin (2011-12-13-14-15-16-17-18-19)
- 2020s: 5 for Dublin (2020-21-22-23-24)

=== Other records ===
==== Gaps ====
- Longest gaps between successive Leinster SFC titles:
  - 68 years: Louth (1957–2025)
  - 57 years: Laois (1946–2003)
  - 44 years: Meath (1895–1939)
  - 42 years: Kildare (1956–1998)
  - 31 years: Louth (1912–1943)
  - 22 years: Westmeath (2004–2026)
  - 20 years: Wexford (1925–1945)

==== Active gaps ====
- Longest gaps since last Leinster SFC title:
  - 115 years: Kilkenny (1911–)
  - 82 years: Carlow (1944–)
  - 81 years: Wexford (1945–)
  - 58 years: Longford (1968–)
  - 29 years: Offaly (1997–)
  - 26 years: Kildare (2000–)
  - 23 years: Laois (2003–)
  - 16 years: Meath (2010–)
  - 2 years: Dublin (2024–)
  - 1 year: Louth (2025–)
  - 0 years: Westmeath (2026–)
- Longest gaps since last Leinster SFC final appearance:
  - 129 years: Wicklow (1897–)
  - 104 years: Kilkenny (1922–)
  - 82 years: Carlow (1944–)
  - 58 years: Longford (1968–)
  - 20 years: Offaly (2006–)
  - 15 years: Wexford (2011–)
  - 8 years: Laois (2018–)
  - 4 years: Kildare (2022–)
  - 1 year: Louth (2025–)
  - 1 year: Meath (2025–)
  - 0 years: Dublin (2026–)
  - 0 years: Westmeath (2026–)

==== Longest undefeated run ====
- Dublin - 43 matches (2011–2025): The record for the longest unbeaten run stands at 39 games held by Dublin. It began with a 1–16 to 0–11 win over Laois on 5 June 2011. Dublin completed a provincial 10 in a row with a 3–21 to 0–9 win over Meath on 21 November 2020. The streak is still running at 42 matches, after Dublin won the 2024 Leinster SFC title. In 2025 Meath ended Dublin spell in the Leinster championship semi-final.

==== Leinster SFC final pairings ====
Pairing	Meeting	First Meeting	Last meeting
Dublin v Meath	25	1894	2020
Dublin v Kildare	18	1891	2022
Dulbin v Wexford	12	1890	2011
Dublin v Offaly	8	1907	2006
Dublin v Louth	8	1892	2024
Dublin v Laois	6	1959	2018
Louth v Wexford	5	1913	1953
Meath v Offaly	5	1954	1997
Kildare v Laois	5	1929	2003
Kildare v Wexford	4	1916	1956
Laois v Meath	4	1940	1991
Louth v Meath	4	1950	2025
Laois v Louth	3	1889	1943
Carlow v Dublin	3	1941	1944
Kildare v Meath	3	1930	1998
Kildare v Offaly	3	1969	1972
Dublin v Westmeath	3	2015	2026
Kilkenny v Wexford	2	1888	1893
Kilkenny v Louth	2	1900	1909
Dublin v Kilkenny	2	1904	1922
Kildare v Louth	2	1905	1935
Dublin v Wicklow	1	1897	
Kildare v Kilkenny	1	1903	
Kilkenny v Meath	1	1911	
Kildare v Westmeath	1	1931	
Meath v Wexford	1	1939	
Offaly v Wexford	1	1945	
Meath v Westmeath	1	1949	
Louth v Offaly	1	1960	
Dublin v Longford	1	1965	
Laois v Longford	1	1968	
Laois v Offaly	1	1981	
Laois v Westmeath	1	2004	

== Player records ==
=== Top scorers ===
==== All time ====
As of 2020 championship
Pos.	Name	Team	Goals	Points	Total
1	Brian Stafford	Meath	9	152	179
2	Barney Rock	Dublin	10	136	166
3	Tony McTague	Offaly	3	149	158
4	Jimmy Keaveney	Dublin	10	125	155
5	Charlie Redmond	Dublin	6	124	142

==== By year ====
Year	Top scorer	Team	Score	Total
1968	John Lalor	Laois	1–22	25
1969	Jack Berry	Wexford	2–18	24
1970	Jim Hanniffy	Longford	1–21	24
1970	Tony Brennan	Meath	0–21	24
1971	Tony McTague	Offaly	1–20	23
1972	Tony McTague	Offaly	0–14	14
1973	Tony McTague	Offaly	0–22	22
1974	Jimmy Keaveney	Dublin	1–24	27
1975	Jimmy Keaveney	Dublin	1–23	26
1976	Jimmy Keaveney	Dublin	4–11	23
1977	Vincent Henry	Offaly	1–18	21
1978	John McCarthy	Dublin	4-09	21
1979	Seán Lowry	Offaly	0–21	21
1980	Matt Connor	Offaly	3–22	31
1981	Tom Prendergast	Laois	6-05	23
1981	Matt Connor	Offaly	1–20	23
1982	Barney Rock	Dublin	1–18	21
1983	Matt Connor	Offaly	3–19	28
1984	Matt Connor	Offaly	2–17	23
1985	Barney Rock	Dublin	2–13	19
1986	Robert McHugh	Wicklow	0–16	16
1987	Barney Rock	Dublin	0–23	23
1988	John McCormack	Longford	1–21	24
1989	Brian Stafford	Meath	1–19	22
1990	Mick Turley	Laois	2–12	18
1991	Brian Stafford	Meath	4–48	60
1992	Charlie Redmond	Dublin	1–20	23
1993	Niall Buckley	Kildare	1–17	20
1994	Charlie Redmond	Dublin	3–20	29
1995	Charlie Redmond	Dublin	0–23	23
1996	Anthony Keating	Carlow	1–19	22
1997	Trevor Giles	Meath	2–18	24
1998	Ger Heavin	Westmeath	2–14	20
1999	Dessie Dolan	Westmeath	2–13	19
2000	Leigh O'Brien	Wexford	0–21	21
2001	Trevor Giles	Meath	1–14	17
2002	Ray Cosgrove	Dublin	3–12	21
2003	Brian McDonald	Laois	2–13	19
2004	Dessie Dolan	Westmeath	1–23	26
2005	Tomás Quinn	Dublin	0–20	20
2006	Mattie Forde	Wexford	1–19	22
2007	Mark Vaughan	Dublin	2–17	23
2008	Alan Brogan	Dublin	2–12	18
2009	Bernard Brogan Jnr	Dublin	2–17	23
2010	Cian Ward	Meath	1–21	24
2011	Ben Brosnan	Wexford	0–29	29
2012	Brian Farrell	Meath	0–29	29
2013	Michael Newman	Meath	0–22	22
2014	Michael Newman	Meath	4-04	16
2014	Ross Munnelly	Laois	0–16	16
2015	John Heslin	Westmeath	1–23	26
2016	Dean Rock	Dublin	1–28	31
2017	Dean Rock	Dublin	2–11	17
2017	Con O'Callaghan	Dublin	0–17	17
2018	Dean Rock	Dublin	2–16	22
2019	Cormac Costello	Dublin	1–24	27
2020	Jordan Morris	Meath	4-09	21

==== Single game ====
Year	Top scorer	Team	Score	Total
1995	Damien Delaney	Laois	2-05	11
1996	Dessie Barry	Longford	2-05	11
1997	Trevor Giles	Meath	2-08	14
1998	Dessie Barry	Longford	0-09	9
1999	Dessie Dolan	Westmeath	1-07	10
2000	Tommy Gill	Wicklow	1-06	9
2000	Pádraig Davis	Longford	0-09	9
2001	Ollie Murphy	Meath	2-02	8
2001	Pádraig Davis	Longford	1-05	8
2001	Pádraig Davis	Longford	1-05	8
2001	Ger Heavin	Westmeath	1-05	8
2001	Trevor Giles	Meath	1-05	8
2001	Pádraig Brennan	Kildare	0-08	8
2002	Ray Cosgrove	Dublin	2-03	9
2002	Ciaran McManus	Offaly	1-06	9
2003	Dessie Dolan	Westmeath	1-07	10
2004	Dessie Dolan	Westmeath	1-07	10
2005	Tomás Quinn	Dublin	0–10	10
2006	Mattie Forde	Wexford	0–12	12
2007	Brian Kavanagh	Longford	2-06	12
2008	Alan Brogan	Dublin	1-07	10
2009	Bernard Brogan Jnr	Dublin	2-08	14
2010	Bernard Brogan Jnr	Dublin	2-04	10
2011	Shane Roche	Wexford	2-04	10
2011	Ciarán Lyng	Wexford	0–10	10
2012	Bernard Brogan Jnr	Dublin	2-05	11
2013	Michael Newman	Meath	0-09	9
2014	Michael Newman	Meath	3-02	11
2015	John Heslin	Westmeath	1-09	12
2016	Dean Rock	Dublin	1–10	13
2017	Con O'Callaghan	Dublin	0–12	12
2018	Ciarán Kilkenny	Dublin	1-07	10
2019	Cormac Costello	Dublin	1–12	15
2020	Jordan Morris	Meath	3-04	13

==== Finals ====
Year	Top scorer	Team	Score	Total
1966	Murty O'Sullivan	Meath	0-05	5
1966	Jack Donnelly	Kildare	0-05	5
1967	Tony Brennan	Meath	0-04	4
1968	Seán Donnelly	Longford	2-01	7
1969	Jack Donnelly	Kildare	0-05	5
1970	Tony Brennan	Meath	0–10	10
1971	Tony McTague	Offaly	0-09	9
1972	Tony McTague	Offaly	0-06	6
1973	Tony McTague	Offaly	0–11	11
1974	Jimmy Keaveney	Dublin	1-08	11
1975	Brian Mullins	Dublin	2-00	6
1976	Colm O'Rourke	Meath	1-01	4
1976	Jimmy Keaveney	Dublin	0-04	4
1977	Jimmy Keaveney	Dublin	0-06	6
1978	Jimmy Keaveney	Dublin	0-07	7
1979	Seán Lowry	Offaly	0-06	6
1980	Matt Connor	Offaly	1-07	10
1981	Willie Brennan	Laois	1-03	6
1981	Brendan Lowry	Offaly	1-03	6
1981	Matt Connor	Offaly	0-06	6
1982	Séamus Darby	Offaly	1-03	6
1983	Matt Connor	Offaly	1-07	10
1984	Kieran Duff	Dublin	1-04	7
1985	Barney Rock	Dublin	0-06	6
1986	Finian Murtagh	Meath	0-03	3
1986	Colm O'Rourke	Meath	0-03	3
1986	Barney Rock	Dublin	0-03	3
1987	Mattie McCabe	Meath	1-02	5
1987	Brian Stafford	Meath	0-05	5
1988	P. J. Gillic	Meath	1-03	6
1989	Vinnie Murphy	Dublin	1-02	5
1989	Brian Stafford	Meath	0-05	5
1990	Brian Stafford	Meath	0-08	8
1991	Brian Stafford	Meath	0-05	5
1992	Charlie Redmond	Dublin	0-05	5
1993	Charlie Redmond	Dublin	0-05	5
1994	Charlie Redmond	Dublin	1-04	7
1995	Charlie Redmond	Dublin	0-07	7
1996	Trevor Giles	Meath	0-04	4
1997	Vinny Claffey	Offaly	1-05	8
1998	Pádraig Graven	Kildare	0-04	4
1999	Ollie Murphy	Meath	1-05	8
2000	Pádraig Brennan	Kildare	0-05	5
2001	Richie Kealy	Meath	1-01	4
2001	Collie Moran	Dublin	0-04	4
2002	Tadhg Fennin	Kildare	2-02	8
2003	Brian McDonald	Laois	1-02	5
2003	John Doyle	Kildare	0-05	5
2004	Denis Glennon	Westmeath	0-05	5
2005	Ross Munnelly	Laois	0-05	5
2006	Tomás Quinn	Dublin	0-07	7
2007	Mark Vaughan	Dublin	1-06	9
2008	Alan Brogan	Dublin	1-04	7
2009	Bernard Brogan Jnr	Dublin	0-07	7
2010	Brian White	Louth	0-04	4
2010	Graham Reilly	Meath	0-04	4
2010	Cian Ward	Meath	0-04	4
2011	Ben Brosnan	Wexford	0-09	9
2012	Bernard Brogan Jnr	Dublin	1-07	10
2013	Michael Newman	Meath	0-08	8
2014	Bernard Brogan Jnr	Dublin	1-06	9
2015	Bernard Brogan Jnr	Dublin	1-01	4
2016	Dean Rock	Dublin	0-08	8
2017	Con O'Callaghan	Dublin	0–12	12
2018	Dean Rock	Dublin	0-08	8
2019	Dean Rock	Dublin	0-04	4
2020	Dean Rock	Dublin	1-07	10

=== Leinster SFC medal winners ===
Rank	Player	Team	No.	Years
1	Stephen Cluxton	Dublin	18	2002, 2005, 2006, 2007, 2008, 2009, 2011, 2012, 2013, 2014, 2015, 2016, 2017, 2018, 2019, 2020, 2023, 2024
2	Michael Fitzsimons	Dublin	14	2011, 2012, 2013, 2014, 2015, 2016, 2017, 2018, 2019, 2020, 2021, 2022, 2023, 2024
2	James McCarthy	Dublin	14	2011, 2012, 2013, 2014, 2015, 2016, 2017, 2018, 2019, 2020, 2021, 2022, 2023, 2024
4	Bernard Brogan Jnr	Dublin	13	2006, 2007, 2008, 2009, 2011, 2012, 2013, 2014, 2015, 2016, 2017, 2018, 2019
4	Philly McMahon	Dublin	13	2008, 2009, 2011, 2012, 2013, 2014, 2015, 2016, 2017, 2018, 2019, 2020, 2021
6	Paddy Andrews	Dublin	12	2008, 2009, 2011, 2012, 2013, 2014, 2015, 2016, 2017, 2018, 2019, 2020
7	Alan Brogan	Dublin	11	2002, 2005, 2006, 2007, 2008, 2009, 2011, 2012, 2013, 2014, 2015
7	Diarmuid Connolly	Dublin	11	2007, 2008, 2009, 2011, 2012, 2013, 2014, 2015, 2016, 2017, 2019
7	Cian O'Sullivan	Dublin	11	2009, 2011, 2012, 2013, 2014, 2015, 2016, 2017, 2018, 2019, 2020

== Managers ==
Managers in the Leinster SFC are involved in the day-to-day running of the team, including the training, team selection, and sourcing of players from the club championships. Their influence varies from county-to-county and is related to the individual county boards. From 2018, all inter-county head coaches must be Award 2 qualified. The manager is assisted by a team of two or three selectors and an extensive backroom team consisting of various coaches. Prior to the development of the concept of a manager in the 1970s, teams were usually managed by a team of selectors with one member acting as chairman.

=== Winning managers (1971–present) ===
#	Manager(s)	Winning team(s)	Titles(s)	Winning years
1	Seán Boylan	Meath	8	1986, 1987, 1988, 1990, 1991, 1996, 1999, 2001
2	Kevin Heffernan	Dublin	7	1974, 1975, 1976, 1979, 1983, 1984, 1985
2	Jim Gavin	Dublin	7	2013, 2014, 2015, 2016, 2017, 2018, 2019
4	Dessie Farrell	Dublin	5	2020, 2021, 2022, 2023, 2024
5	Paul Caffrey	Dublin	4	2005, 2006, 2007, 2008
6	Tom Gilhooley	Offaly	3	1971, 1972, 1973
6	Eugene McGee	Offaly	3	1980, 1981, 1982
6	Pat O'Neill	Dublin	3	1993, 1994, 1995
6	Mick O'Dwyer	Kildare; Laois	2; 1	1998, 2000; 2003
6	Pat Gilroy	Dublin	3	2009, 2011, 2012
11	Tony Hanahoe	Dublin	2	1977, 1978
11	Tommy Lyons	Offaly; Dublin	2	1997, 2002
13	Gerry McCaul	Dublin	1	1989
13	Paddy Cullen	Dublin	1	1992
13	Páidí Ó Sé	Westmeath	1	2004
13	Éamonn O'Brien	Meath	1	2010
13	Ger Brennan	Louth	1	2025
13	Mark McHugh	Westmeath	1	2026

== Sponsorship ==
Since 1994, the Leinster SFC has been sponsored. The sponsor has usually been able to determine the championship's sponsorship name.

Period	Sponsor(s)	Name
1888–1993	No main sponsor	The Leinster Championship
1994–2007	Bank of Ireland	The Bank of Ireland Leinster Championship
2008–2009	Toyota, Ulster Bank, Vodafone	The Leinster GAA Football Championship
2010	SuperValu, Ulster Bank, Vodafone	The Leinster GAA Football Championship
2011–2013	SuperValu, Ulster Bank, Eircom	The Leinster GAA Football Championship
2014	SuperValu, GAAGO, Eircom	The Leinster GAA Football Championship
2015	SuperValu, AIB, Eircom	The Leinster GAA Football Championship
2016–	SuperValu, AIB, Eir	The Leinster GAA Football Championship

== Venues ==
Croke Park has hosted the Leinster final since the early years of the championship.

=== History ===
Leinster SFC matches were traditionally played at neutral venues or at a location that was deemed to be halfway between the two participants; however, teams eventually came to home and away agreements. Every second meeting between these teams is played at the home venue of one of them. Championship semi-finals were usually played both on the same day at Croke Park. The selection of Croke Park for the vast majority of Dublin's games in recent years has also come in for criticism in the 2nd decade of the 21st century, as it offers a perceived advantage to play in what is effectively their "home" stadium. This has continued into the 2020s.

Cavan took part in 1895 when the Connacht and Ulster championships were abolished between 1893 and 1899. London played Louth in the 1913 championship.

=== Attendances ===
Stadium attendances are a significant source of regular income for the Leinster Council and for the teams involved. For the 2018 championship, gate receipts fell by almost 30% to €1,879,326, compared to €2,634,837 the previous year. The average attendance for the entire series of games was just over 20,000, down from a peak of over 60,000 in 2002. The 2006 final between Dublin and Offaly saw a record attendance of 81,754.

=== Current venues ===
County team	Location	Province	Stadium	Capacity
Carlow	Carlow	Leinster	Dr Cullen Park	11,000
Dublin	Dublin	Leinster	Croke Park	82,300
Kildare	Newbridge	Leinster	St Conleth's Park	8,200
Laois	Portlaoise	Leinster	O'Moore Park	22,000
Longford	Longford	Leinster	Pearse Park	6,000
Louth	Drogheda	Leinster	Drogheda Park	3,500
Meath	Navan	Leinster	Páirc Tailteann	11,000
Offaly	Tullamore	Leinster	O'Connor Park	18,000
Westmeath	Mullingar	Leinster	Cusack Park	11,500
Wexford	Wexford	Leinster	Chadwicks Wexford Park	18,000
Wicklow	Aughrim	Leinster	Aughrim County Ground	7,000

== See also ==
- Leinster Senior Club Football Championship
- Leinster Senior Hurling Championship
- All-Ireland Senior Football Championship
  - Connacht Senior Football Championship
  - Munster Senior Football Championship
  - Ulster Senior Football Championship

== Sources ==
- Roll of Honour from Leinster GAA website
