= 2022 Leinster Senior Football Championship =

Gaelic football season

2022 Leinster SFC
Tournament details
- Year: 2022

Winners
- Champions: Dublin (61st win)
- Manager: Dessie Farrell
- Captain: James McCarthy

Runners-up
- Runners-up: Kildare
- Manager: Glenn Ryan
- Captain: Mick O'Grady

The 2022 Leinster Senior Football Championship was the 2022 iteration of the Leinster Senior Football Championship organised by Leinster GAA.

The draws for the preliminary round and quarter-finals took place on Saturday 27 November 2021, while the draw for the semi-finals took place on Sunday 1 May 2022.

Dublin won the competition.

== Teams ==
The Leinster championship was contested by 11 of the 12 county teams in Leinster, a province of Ireland. Kilkenny was the only county team not to compete.

Team	Colours	Sponsor	Manager	Captain	Most recent success
Team	Colours	Sponsor	Manager	Captain	All-Ireland	Provincial
Carlow	Red, green and gold	IT Carlow	Niall Carew			1944
Dublin	Sky blue and navy	AIG	Dessie Farrell		2020	2021
Kildare	White	Brady's Family Ham	Glenn Ryan		1928	2000
Laois	Blue and white	MW Hire	Billy Sheehan			2003
Longford	Royal blue and gold	Glennon Brothers	Billy O'Loughlin			1968
Louth	Red and white	StatSports	Mickey Harte	Sam Mulroy	1957	1957
Meath	Green and gold	Devenish	Andy McEntee	Shane McEntee	1999	2010
Offaly	White, green and gold	Carroll's	John Maughan		1982	1997
Westmeath	Maroon and white	Renault	Jack Cooney	Kevin Maguire		2004
Wexford	Purple and gold	Zurich	Shane Roche		1918	1945
Wicklow	Royal blue and gold	Joule	Alan Costello and Gary Duffy	Dean Healy

== Draw ==
The semi-finalists from the 2021 competition, along with one unseeded team, received a bye to the quarter-finals. The six remaining unseeded teams played in the preliminary round.

Seeded	Unseeded
Dublin Kildare Meath Westmeath	Carlow Laois Longford Louth Offaly Wexford Wicklow

== Bracket ==
Preliminary round 24 April
Louth	5-10
Carlow	0-10
Wexford	1-15
Offaly	1-12
Wicklow	5-15
Laois	4-12

Quarter-finals; 30 April / 1 May
Louth	0-12
Kildare	2-22
Westmeath	3-13
Longford	0-14
Wexford	0-04
Dublin	1-24
Meath	4-13
Wicklow	1-12

Semi-finals; 15 May
Kildare	1-21
Westmeath	2-15
Dublin	1-27
Meath	1-14

Final; 29 May
Kildare	1-15
Dublin	5-17

== Preliminary round ==
24 April 2022; Preliminary round	Louth	5-10 - 0-10	Carlow	Pairc Tailteann, Navan; Attendance: 3,000; Referee: Niall Cullen (Fermanagh); Man of the Match: Sam Mulroy (Naomh Máirtín)
24 April 2022; Preliminary round	Sam Mulroy 2-5 (1-0 pen, 0-3f, 1 '45), Tommy Durnin and Conor Grimes 1-1 each, Ciaran Byrne 1-0, Ciaran Downey 0-2, Conor Earley 0-1	Report	Darragh Foley 0-3 (0-2f), Ross Dunphy 0-2, Josh Moore, Jamie Clarke (0-1f), Conor Crowley, Colm Hulton, Niall Hickey 0-1 each	Pairc Tailteann, Navan; Attendance: 3,000; Referee: Niall Cullen (Fermanagh); Man of the Match: Sam Mulroy (Naomh Máirtín)

24 April 2022; Preliminary round	Wicklow	5-15 - 4-12	Laois	Aughrim Park, Aughrim; Attendance: 4,100; Referee: Fergal Kelly (Longford); Man of the Match: Kevin Quinn (Blessington)
24 April 2022; Preliminary round	Kevin Quinn 3-0, Mark Kenny 0-5, Eoin Darcy 1-2 (0-1f), Padraig O'Toole 1-1, Mark Jackson 0-3f, Dean Healy 0-2, Andy Maher and Darragh Fitzgerald 0-1 each	Report	Gary Walsh 2-2 (0-2f), Paddy O'Sullivan 1-1, Sean O'Flynn 1-0, Mark Barry (0-3f) and Paul Kingston (0-1m, 0-2f) 0-3 each, Evan O'Carroll 0-2, Brian Byrne 0-1	Aughrim Park, Aughrim; Attendance: 4,100; Referee: Fergal Kelly (Longford); Man of the Match: Kevin Quinn (Blessington)

24 April 2022; Preliminary round	Wexford	1-15 - 1-12	Offaly	Wexford Park, Wexford; Referee: Derek O'Mahoney (Tipperary)
24 April 2022; Preliminary round	Ben Brosnan 1-8 (0-4f), Darragh Brooks (0-1f), Martin O'Connor, Paraic Hughes, Glen Malone, Kevin O'Grady (0-1f), Eoghan Nolan (0-1m), Tom Byrne 0-1 each	Report	Lee Pearson 1-0, Paddy Dunican 0-3f, Bill Carroll 0-2, Colm Doyle, Niall Darby (0-1f), Johnny Moloney (0-1f), Dylan Hyland (0-1f), Mark Abbott, Bernard Allen (0-1f), Joseph O'Connor 0-1 each	Wexford Park, Wexford; Referee: Derek O'Mahoney (Tipperary)

== Quarter-finals ==
30 April 2022; Quarter-final	Dublin	1-24 - 0-4	Wexford	Wexford Park, Wexford; Referee: Barry Cassidy (Derry); Man of the Match: Brian Fenton (Raheny)
30 April 2022; Quarter-final	Con O'Callaghan 1-6, Brian Fenton and Dean Rock (0-1f, 1 '45) 0-5 each, Brian Howard and Cormac Costello 0-2 each, John Small, Tom Lahiff, Ciaran Kilkenny, Lorcan O'Dell 0-1 each	Report	Paraic Hughes, Niall Hughes (0-1m), Eoghan Nolan, Ben Brosnan 0-1 each	Wexford Park, Wexford; Referee: Barry Cassidy (Derry); Man of the Match: Brian Fenton (Raheny)

30 April 2022; Quarter Final	Westmeath	3-13 - 0-14	Longford	Cusack Park, Mullingar; Attendance: 2,290; Referee: Brendan Cawley (Kildare); Man of the Match: Ronan Wallace (Multyfarnham)
30 April 2022; Quarter Final	John Heslin 1-5 (0-4f), Alex Gardiner 0-3, Ronan O'Toole and Robbie Forde 1-0 each, Nigel Harte and Ray Connellan 0-2 each, Lorcan Dolan 0-1	Report	Darren Gallagher 0-4 (0-2f, 1 '45), Dylan Farrell 0-3f, Paddy Collum (1 '45), Mickey Quinn, Kevin Diffley, Dessie Reynolds, Daniel Reynolds, Keelin McGann, Darragh Doherty 0-1 each	Cusack Park, Mullingar; Attendance: 2,290; Referee: Brendan Cawley (Kildare); Man of the Match: Ronan Wallace (Multyfarnham)

1 May 2022; Quarter-final	Meath	4-13 - 1-12	Wicklow	Páirc Tailteann, Navan; Attendance: 5,000; Referee: Paul Faloon (Down); Man of the Match: Bryan Menton (Donaghmore Ashbourne)
1 May 2022; Quarter-final	Jack O'Connor 1-3 (0-2f), Bryan Menton and Jordan Morris (0-2f) 0-4 each, James McEntee, Matthew Costello, Jack Flynn 1-0 each. Thomas O'Reilly 0-2	Report	Mark Jackson (0-3f, 1 '45) and Eoin Darcy (0-4f) 0-4 each, Oisin McGraynor 1-0 each, Padraig O'Toole 0-2, Rory Stokes and Kevin Quinn 0-1 each	Páirc Tailteann, Navan; Attendance: 5,000; Referee: Paul Faloon (Down); Man of the Match: Bryan Menton (Donaghmore Ashbourne)

1 May 2022; Quarter-final	Kildare	2-22 - 0-12	Louth	O'Connor Park, Tullamore; Attendance: 5,308; Referee: David Gough (Meath); Man of the Match: Ben McCormack (Sarsfields)
1 May 2022; Quarter-final	Darragh Kirwan 1-3 (0-1f), Jimmy Hyland 0-5 (0-1f), Ben McCormack 0-4, Kevin Feely 1-0 pen, Paul Cribbin and Daniel Flynn (0-1m) 0-3 each, Paddy Woodgate 0-2 (0-1f), Alex Beirne and Brian McLoughlin 0-1 each	Report	Sam Mulroy 0-5 (0-1m, 0-1f), Conor Grimes 0-3 (0-2f), Tommy Durnin, Conor Early, Ciaran Byrne, Jack Murphy 0-1 each	O'Connor Park, Tullamore; Attendance: 5,308; Referee: David Gough (Meath); Man of the Match: Ben McCormack (Sarsfields)

== Semi-finals ==
The draw took place after the quarter-finals.

15 May 2022; Semi-final	Kildare	1-21 - 2-15	Westmeath	Croke Park, Dublin; Attendance: 38,081; Referee: Sean Hurson (Tyrone); Man of the Match: Ben McCormack (Sarsfields)
15 May 2022; Semi-final	Jimmy Hyland 1-4 (0-1f), Ben McCormack (0-1m) and Darragh Kirwan (0-1f) 0-5 each, Daniel Flynn 0-2 (0-1m), Tony Archbold, Kevin Flynn, Alex Beirne, Paul Cribbin, Neil Flynn (0-1f) 0-1 each	Report	Ronan O'Toole 1-3, Sam McCartan and John Heslin (0-1f) 0-4 each, Jamie Gonoud 1-0, Ray Conellan 0-2, Nigel Harte and Luke Loughlin 0-1 each	Croke Park, Dublin; Attendance: 38,081; Referee: Sean Hurson (Tyrone); Man of the Match: Ben McCormack (Sarsfields)

15 May 2022; Semi-final	Dublin	1-27 - 1-14	Meath	Croke Park, Dublin; Attendance: 38,081; Referee: Derek O'Mahoney (Tipperary); Man of the Match: James McCarthy (Ballymun Kickhams)
15 May 2022; Semi-final	Dean Rock 1-8 (1-0 pen, 0-5f, 1 '45), Ciarán Kilkenny 0-5, Cormac Costello 0-3, James McCarthy, Tom Lahiff, Lorcan O'Dell, Con O'Callaghan 0-2 each, Brian Howard, Sean Bugler, Paddy Small (0-1m) 0-1 each	Report	Jordan Morris 1-3 (1-0 pen, 0-2f), Bryan Menton and Jack O'Connor (0-2f) 0-3 each, Donal Keogan, Thomas O'Reilly, Joey Wallace, Jack Flynn, Shane McEntee 0-1 each	Croke Park, Dublin; Attendance: 38,081; Referee: Derek O'Mahoney (Tipperary); Man of the Match: James McCarthy (Ballymun Kickhams)

== Final ==
28 May 2022	Dublin	5-17 - 1-15	Kildare	Croke Park, Dublin; Attendance: 38,000 (est.); Referee: Paddy Neilan (Roscommon); Man of the Match: Con O'Callaghan (Cuala)
28 May 2022	Con O'Callaghan 1-5 (0-1m), Cormac Costello 2-1, Dean Rock 0-4f, John Small and Ciarán Kilkenny 1-0 each, Brian Fenton 0-3, Lee Gannon 0-2, Niall Scully and Aaron Byrne 0-1 each	Report	Jimmy Hyland 1-4 (0-3f), Ben McCormack 0-5 (0-1m), Kevin Feely 0-2 (0-1m), Kevin Flynn, Paul Cribbin, Darragh Kirwan, Paddy Woodgate (0-1f) 0-1 each	Croke Park, Dublin; Attendance: 38,000 (est.); Referee: Paddy Neilan (Roscommon); Man of the Match: Con O'Callaghan (Cuala)

== See also ==
- 2022 All-Ireland Senior Football Championship
  - 2022 Connacht Senior Football Championship
  - 2022 Munster Senior Football Championship
  - 2022 Ulster Senior Football Championship
