= 2021 Leinster Senior Football Championship =

Gaelic football season

2021 Leinster SFC
Tournament details
- Year: 2021

Winners
- Champions: Dublin (60th win)
- Manager: Dessie Farrell

Runners-up
- Runners-up: Kildare
- Manager: Jack O'Connor

The 2021 Leinster Senior Football Championship is the 2021 iteration of the Leinster Senior Football Championship organised by Leinster GAA.

== Teams ==
The Leinster championship was contested by 11 of the 12 county teams in Leinster, a province of Ireland. Kilkenny was the only county team not to compete.

Team	Colours	Sponsor	Manager	Captain	Most recent success
Team	Colours	Sponsor	Manager	Captain	All-Ireland	Provincial
Carlow	Red, green and gold	IT Carlow	Niall Carew			1944
Dublin	Sky blue and navy	AIG	Dessie Farrell		2020	2020
Kildare	White	Brady's Family Ham	Jack O'Connor		1928	2000
Laois	Blue and white	MW Hire	Mike Quirke			2003
Longford	Royal blue and gold	Glennon Brothers	Padraic Davis			1968
Louth	Red and white	StatSports	Mickey Harte		1957	1957
Meath	Green and gold	Devenish	Andy McEntee	Shane McEntee	1999	2010
Offaly	White, green and gold	Carroll's	John Maughan		1982	1997
Westmeath	Maroon and white	Renault	Jack Cooney	Kevin Maguire		2004
Wexford	Purple and gold	Zurich	Shane Roche		1918	1945
Wicklow	Royal blue and gold	Joule	Davy Burke	Dean Healy

== Championship draw ==
The draw for the preliminary rounds and quarter-finals took place on 20 April 2021. The draw for the semi-finals took place on 4 July 2021, after the completion of the quarter-final ties.

Preliminary round 27 June
Offaly	3-19 AET
Louth	0-19
Longford	0-25
Carlow	2-13
Wexford	2-11
Wicklow	0-14

Quarter-finals; 4 July
Kildare	1-15
Offaly	0-13
Laois	1-10
Westmeath	3-20
Meath	4-22
Longford	0-12
Dublin	0-15
Wexford	0-7

Semi-finals; 18 July
Kildare	2-14
Westmeath	0-18
Meath	1-13
Dublin	2-16

Final; 1 August
Kildare	1-9
Dublin	0-20

== Preliminary round ==
27 June 2021; 13:30; Round 1	Offaly	3-19 - 0-19 aet	Louth	Páirc Tailteann, Navan; Attendance: 0 Referee: Brendan Cawley (Kildare)
27 June 2021; 13:30; Round 1	Cian Farrell 0-7 (0-3f), Niall McNamee 1-3, Peter Cunningham 1-1, Bernard Allen 1-0, Paddy Dunican 0-2 (0-1f, 1 '45), Niall Darby, Jordan Hayes, Ruairi McNamee, Bill Carroll, Eoin Carroll, Mark Abbott 0-1 each	Report	Sam Mulroy 0-6 (0-4f), Ciaran Byrne 0-3, Ciaran Keenan 0-2, Dermot Campbell, Anthony Williams, Eoghan Callaghan, Liam Jackson, Ciaran Downey, Conor Grimes, Ryan Burns, Declan Byrne 0-1 each	Páirc Tailteann, Navan; Attendance: 0 Referee: Brendan Cawley (Kildare)

27 June 2021; 15:00; Round 1	Wexford	2-11 - 0-14	Wicklow	Aughrim; Attendance: 0 Referee: Fergal Kelly (Longford)
27 June 2021; 15:00; Round 1	Mark Rossiter 1-6 (0-1f), Martin O'Connor 1-0, John Turbitt and Donal Shanley (0-2f) 0-2 each, Paraic Hughes 0-1	Report	Patrick O'Connor 0-4, Arran Murphy 0-3, Mark Jackson (0-2f) and Chris O'Brien (0-2f) 0-2 each, Padraig O'Toole, Mark Kenny, Conor Byrne 0-1 each	Aughrim; Attendance: 0 Referee: Fergal Kelly (Longford)

27 June 2021; 16:30; Round 1	Longford	0-25 - 2-13	Carlow	O'Connor Park, Tullamore; Attendance: 0 Referee: Conor Lane (Cork)
27 June 2021; 16:30; Round 1	Robbie Smyth and Rian Brady 0-5 each, Darren Gallagher 0-4 (0-3f), Dessie Reynolds, David McGivney, Joseph Hagan 0-2 each, Patrick Fox, Michael Quinn, Kevin Diffley, Donal McElligott, Dylan Farrell 0-1 each	Report	Darragh Foley 1-4 (0-3f), Paul Broderick 0-4 (0-3f), Conor Crowley 1-0, Chris Blake 0-3, Colm Hulton 0-2	O'Connor Park, Tullamore; Attendance: 0 Referee: Conor Lane (Cork)

== Quarter-finals ==
4 July 2021; 16:30; Quarter-final	Kildare	1-15 - 0-13	Offaly	O'Moore Park, Portlaoise; Attendance: 500; Referee: Martin McNally (Monaghan)
4 July 2021; 16:30; Quarter-final	Neil Flynn 1-7 (0-4f, 2 '45), Fergal Conway and Jimmy Hyland 0-2 each, Mick O'Grady (0-1m), Kevin Feely, Aaron Masterson, Darragh Kirwan 0-1 each	Report	Cian Farrell 0-8 (0-4f), Niall McNamee 0-2f, Paddy Dunican (1 '45), Anton Sullivan, Bernard Allen 0-1 each	O'Moore Park, Portlaoise; Attendance: 500; Referee: Martin McNally (Monaghan)

4 July 2021; 15:30; Quarter-final	Dublin	0-15 - 0-7	Wexford	Wexford Park, Wexford; Attendance: 500; Referee: Derek O'Mahoney (Tipperary)
4 July 2021; 15:30; Quarter-final	Cormac Costello 0-7 (0-5f), Brian Howard and Brian Fenton 0-2 each, Ciaran Kilkenny, Tom Lahiff, Colm Basquel, Dean Rock 0-1 each	Report	Mark Rossiter 0-3 (0-2f), Donal Shanley 0-2 (0-1f), Paraic Hughes and John Tubritt 0-1 each	Wexford Park, Wexford; Attendance: 500; Referee: Derek O'Mahoney (Tipperary)

4 July 2021; 13:30; Quarter-final	Westmeath	3-20 - 1-10	Laois	O'Connor Park, Tullamore; Attendance: 500; Referee: David Coldrick (Meath)
4 July 2021; 13:30; Quarter-final	Lorcan Dolan 1-3 (0-1f), Ger Egan and John Heslin (0-3f) 0-5 each, Denis Corroon 1-1, David Lynch 1-0, Ronan O'Toole 0-3, James Dolan, Darren Giles, Tommy McDaniel 0-1 each	Report	Donie Kingston 0-6 (0-5f), Evan O'Carroll 1-0, Colm Murphy 0-3 (0-1m), Eoin Lowry 0-1	O'Connor Park, Tullamore; Attendance: 500; Referee: David Coldrick (Meath)

4 July 2021; 15:00; Quarter-final	Meath	4-22 - 0-12	Longford	Páirc Tailteann, Navan; Attendance: 500; Referee: Ciaran Branagan (Down)
4 July 2021; 15:00; Quarter-final	Jordan Morris 1-4 (0-1f), Cathal Hickey 1-2, Bryan McMahon (0-1f) and James McEntee 0-4 each, Shane McEntee and James Conlon 1-0 each, Cillian O'Sullivan 0-3, Fionn Reilly, Bryan Menton, Matthew Costello (1 '45), Joey Wallace, Eamon Wallace 0-1 each	Report	David McGivney (0-3f) and Rian Brady (0-1f) 0-3 each, Kevin Diffley, Darren Gallagher (0-1f), Dessie Reynolds, Robbie Smyth (0-1f), Joseph Hagan (0-1m), Darragh Doherty 0-1 each	Páirc Tailteann, Navan; Attendance: 500; Referee: Ciaran Branagan (Down)

== Semi-finals ==
18 July 2021; 14:00; Semi-final	Kildare	2-14 - 0-18	Westmeath	Croke Park, Dublin; Attendance: Limited to 18,000 due to COVID-19 restrictions. Referee: Derek O'Mahoney (Tipperary)
18 July 2021; 14:00; Semi-final	Neil Flynn 0-7 (0-4f), Daniel Flynn and Jimmy Hyland 1-1 each, Kevin Feely, Aaron Masterson, Alex Beirne, Fergal Conway, Shane O'Sullivan 0-1 each	Report	John Heslin 0-8 (0-7f), Lorcan Dolan 0-5 (0-1m), James Dolan, Sam McCartan (1 '45), Ger Egan, David Lynch, Darren Giles 0-1 each	Croke Park, Dublin; Attendance: Limited to 18,000 due to COVID-19 restrictions. Referee: Derek O'Mahoney (Tipperary)

18 July 2021; 16:30; Semi-final	Dublin	2-16 - 1-13	Meath	Croke Park, Dublin; Attendance: Limited to 18,000 due to COVID-19 restrictions. Referee: Conor Lane (Cork)
18 July 2021; 16:30; Semi-final	Cormac Costello 1-4 (1-0 pen), Con O'Callaghan 1-3, Ciaran Kilkenny 0-5, Dean Rock 0-2 (0-1f), Brian Fenton and Paddy Small 0-1 each	Report	Matthew Costello 1-2 (0-1f), Jordan Morris 0-3 (0-1), Eamonn Wallace and Joey Wallace 0-2 each, Cillian O'Sullivan, Bryan McMahon, James McEntee (1 '45), Thomas O'Reilly (0-1f) 0-1 each	Croke Park, Dublin; Attendance: Limited to 18,000 due to COVID-19 restrictions. Referee: Conor Lane (Cork)

== Final ==
RTÉ

1 August 2021
16:00 IST (UTC+1)
Final

Dublin	0-20 (20) – (12) 1-09	Kildare
(HT: 0-9 - 0-5)

Croke Park, Dublin
Referee: Martin McNally (Monaghan)
Attendance: 18,000

Dublin advanced to the 2021 All-Ireland SFC semi-finals.

== See also ==
- 2021 All-Ireland Senior Football Championship
  - 2021 Connacht Senior Football Championship
  - 2021 Munster Senior Football Championship
  - 2021 Ulster Senior Football Championship
