= 2020 Leinster Senior Football Championship =

2020 Leinster SFC
Tournament details
- Year: 2020

Winners
- Champions: Dublin (59th win)

Runners-up
- Runners-up: Meath

The 2020 Leinster Senior Football Championship is the 2020 iteration of Leinster Senior Football Championship organised by Leinster GAA.

The tournament was won by Dublin, their 59th Leinster championship, and tenth in a row, en route to their sixth consecutive All-Ireland title.

== Teams ==
The Leinster championship was contested by 11 of the 12 county teams in Leinster, a province of Ireland. Kilkenny was the only county team not to compete.

Team	Colours	Sponsor	Manager	Captain	Most recent success
Team	Colours	Sponsor	Manager	Captain	All-Ireland	Provincial
Carlow	Red, green and gold		Niall Carew			1944
Dublin	Sky blue and navy	AIG	Dessie Farrell	Stephen Cluxton	2019	2019
Kildare	White		Jack O'Connor		1928	2000
Laois	Blue and white					2003
Longford	Royal blue and gold		Padraic Davis			1968
Louth	Red and white		Wayne Kierans		1957	1957
Meath	Green and gold		Andy McEntee		1999	2010
Offaly	White, green and gold		John Maughan		1982	1997
Westmeath	Maroon and white		Jack Cooney	Kieran Martin		2004
Wexford	Purple and gold		Shane Roche^{i}		1918	1945
Wicklow	Royal blue and gold	Joule	Davy Burke	Dean Healy

(i) = interim

Shane Roche was originally a selector but was appointed interim manager of Wexford after Paul Galvin left suddenly in September 2020. Roche was formally ratified for a two-year term as manager in January 2021.

== Draw ==
The draw for the preliminary rounds and quarter-finals was released by Leinster GAA on 7 October 2019. In a change to previous years' championships, a separate draw for the semi-finals was due to take place once the quarter-final ties had been played, however, due to the impact of the COVID-19 pandemic on Gaelic games and the resultant rescheduling of the 2020 All-Ireland Senior Football Championship, the draw for the semi-finals was made on 26 June 2020.

Preliminary round
Carlow	0-20
Offaly	3-14
Wexford	0-11
Wicklow	2-09
Louth	1-07
Longford	1-09

Quarter-finals
Offaly	0-16
Kildare	0-20
Wicklow	0-07
Meath	7-14
Longford	1-14
Laois	1-16
Westmeath	0-11
Dublin	0-22

Semi-finals
Kildare	0-15
Meath	5-09
Laois	0-07
Dublin	2-23

Final
Meath	0-09
Dublin	3-21

== Matches ==
=== Preliminary round ===
1 November 2020 First round	Carlow	0–20 (20) – (23) 3–14	Offaly	Tullamore
13:30 GMT (UTC+0)		(HT: 2-06 – 0-09)		Venue: O'Connor Park
	Pts: P Broderick 8 (5f, 1 '45', 0-1 pen); C Blake 3; E Ruth 1, D Foley (f) 1, R Dunphy 1, J Morrissey 1, J Clarke 1, J Murphy 1, S Bambrick 1, C Hulton 1, D Murphy (f) 1.	Report	Gls: B Allen 1, N McNamee 1, J Hayes 1. Pts: B Allen 4 (1f, 1m); C Farrell 4 (2f, 1 '45); N McNamee 2 (1f); A Sullivan 2; P Cunningham 1, C Mangan 1.	Referee: Fergal Kelly (Longford); Attendance: 0

1 November 2020 First round	Wexford	0–11 (11) – (15) 2-09	Wicklow	Wexford
13:30 GMT (UTC+0)		(HT: 0-08 – 1-03)		Venue: Wexford Park
	Pts: B Brosnan 5 (5f), A Tobin 2 (1f), M Rossiter 1, D Waters 1, E Nolan 1 (m), M O’Connor, 1.	Report	Gls: C Byrne 1, D Healy 1. Pts: S Furlong 4 (2f), C Byrne 1 (1f), G Murphy 1, P O’Toole 1, R Finn 1, M Jackson (’45) 1.	Referee: Maurice Deegan (Laois); Attendance: 0

1 November 2020 First round	Louth	1–07 (10) – (12) 1-09	Longford	Mullingar
13:30 GMT (UTC+0)		(HT: 1-04 – 1-05)		Venue: Cusack Park
	Gls: S Mulroy 1 Pts: S Mulroy 7 (4f, 1 45).	Report	Gls: D Gallagher 1 Pts: D Gallagher 3 (1f), R Smyth 2 (1m), R Brady 2, D Mimnagh 1, L Connerton 1.	Referee: David Coldrick (Meath); Attendance: 0

=== Quarter-finals ===
7 November 2020; 18:15; Quarter-final	Dublin	0-22 - 0-11	Westmeath	O'Moore Park, Portlaoise; Attendance: 0 Referee: Martin McNally (Monaghan); Man of the Match: Ciarán Kilkenny (Castleknock)
7 November 2020; 18:15; Quarter-final	Dean Rock 0-7 (0-6f), Ciarán Kilkenny 0-5, Sean Bugler and Paddy Small 0-2 each, Eoin Murchan, Jonny Cooper, Robbie McDaid, James McCarthy, Niall Scully, Con O’Callaghan 0-1 each	Report	John Heslin 0-3 (0-2f), Ray Connellan, Luke Loughlin, Kieran Martin (0-1m) 0-2 each, Ronan O’Toole and Jack Smith 0-1 each	O'Moore Park, Portlaoise; Attendance: 0 Referee: Martin McNally (Monaghan); Man of the Match: Ciarán Kilkenny (Castleknock)

8 November 2020; 13:30; Quarter-final	Meath	7-14 - 0-7	Wicklow	Aughrim County Ground; Attendance: 0 Referee: Ciaran Branagan (Down); Man of the Match: Shane McEntee (St Peters Dunboyne)
8 November 2020; 13:30; Quarter-final	Jordan Morris 3-4 (2-0 pen, 0-1f), Bryan Menton 1-1, Matthew Costello, Joey Wallace, Cathal Hickey 1-0 each, Shane Walsh 0-3 (0-1f), Bryan McMahon and James Conlon 0-2 each, Shane McEntee and Cillian O'Sullivan 0-1 each	Report	Mark Jackson (0-2f) and Seanie Furlong (0-2f) 0-2 each, Andy Maher, Dean Healy, Eoin Darcy 0-1 each	Aughrim County Ground; Attendance: 0 Referee: Ciaran Branagan (Down); Man of the Match: Shane McEntee (St Peters Dunboyne)

8 November 2020 Quarter-final	Longford	1–14 (17) – (19) 1–16	Laois	Longford
13:30				Venue: Glennon Brothers Pearse Park
	Gls: D Reynolds 1 Pts: R Brady 5 (3fs), D McElligott 2, D Minmagh 2, D Reynolds 1, L Connerton 1, D Gallagher 1 (f), I O’Sullivan 1, J Hagan 1.	Report	Gls: P Kingston; Pts: G Walsh 8 (7fs); P Kingston 1; E O’Carroll 1, T Collins 1, S O’Flynn 1, R Munnelly 1 (m), M Keogh 1, M Barry 1, J O’Loughlin 1.	Referee: Sean Hurson (Tyrone); Attendance: 0

8 November 2020 Quarter-final	Offaly	0–16 (16) – (20) 0–20	Kildare	Portlaoise
17:30		(HT: 0-09 – 0–10)		Venue: O'Moore Park
	Pts: C Farrell 6 (1f, 0-2 '45), N McNamee 4f, R McNamee 2, B Allen 1, A Sullivan 1, J O'Connor 1, P Dunican 1f	Report	Pts: D Kirwan 6 (0-1m), P Brophy 3, N Flynn 3 (2f, 1m), J Hyland 2 (1f), B McCormack 2, D Flynn 1, D Malone 1, A Masterson 1, P Cribbin 1	Referee: David Coldrick (Meath); Attendance: 0 TV: GAAGO

=== Semi-finals ===
15 November 2020 Semi-final	Kildare	0-15 (15) – (24) 5-09	Meath	Dublin
13:00 GMT (UTC+0)		(HT: 0-10 - 0-04)		Venue: Croke Park
	Pts: J Hyland 5 (3f, 1m), D Kirwan 2, P Brophy 2, D Flynn 1, B McCormack 1, M Byrne 1, K Flynn 1, F Conway 1, D Hyland 1.	Report	Gls: J Morris 1, M Costello 1, C O'Sullivan 1, J Scully 1, J Wallace 1. Pts: T O'Reilly 2, S Walsh 1, C Hickey 1, S McEntee 1, J Conlon 1, J Morris 1 (1f), M Costello 1, C O'Sullivan 1.	Referee: Conor Lane (Cork); Attendance: 0 TV: RTÉ News Now

15 November 2020; 15:30; Semi-final	Dublin	2-23 - 0-7	Laois	Croke Park; Attendance: 0 Referee: Ciaran Branagan (Down); Man of the Match: Ciarán Kilkenny (Castleknock)
15 November 2020; 15:30; Semi-final	Ciarán Kilkenny 1-4, Cormac Costello 0-7 (0-3f, 0-1m, 1 '45), Brian Fenton 0-4, Sean Bugler 1-0, Niall Scully 0-3, Dean Rock 0-2 (0-1f, 1 '45), Robbie McDaid, Paddy Small, Con O'Callaghan 0-1 each	Report	Paul Kingston and Gary Walsh (0-1f) 0-2 each, Brian Byrne, Evan O'Carroll (0-1m), Ross Munnelly (0-1f) 0-1 each	Croke Park; Attendance: 0 Referee: Ciaran Branagan (Down); Man of the Match: Ciarán Kilkenny (Castleknock)

=== Final ===
21 November 2020 Final	Meath	0-09 (9) – (30) 3-21	Dublin	Dublin
19:00 GMT (UTC+0)		(HT: 0-02 - 2-12)		Venue: Croke Park
	Pts: J Morris 4 (1f); B Menton 1, C O'Sullivan 1, J Scully 1; T O'Reilly 1 (f); J Wallace 1 (m).	Report	Gls: D Rock 1, S Bugler 1, N Scully 1. Pts: D Rock 7 (5f, 1 '45'); C Kilkenny 4; P Small 3 (2m); C O'Callaghan 2; S Bugler 2, J Small 1; P Mannion 1 (f), N Scully 1.	Referee: Derek O'Mahoney (Tipperary); Attendance: 0 TV: RTÉ

== See also ==
- 2020 All-Ireland Senior Football Championship
  - 2020 Connacht Senior Football Championship
  - 2020 Munster Senior Football Championship
  - 2020 Ulster Senior Football Championship
