= Jack Donnelly (Gaelic footballer) =

Irish Gaelic footballer

Personal information
- Native name: Seán Ó Donnaile (Irish)
- Born: 1944 Rathangan, County Mayo, Ireland
- Height: 6 ft 0 in (183 cm)

Sport
- Sport: Gaelic football
- Position: Midfield
Club
- Years: Club
- Ellistown
Club titles
- Kildare titles: 0
Inter-county
- Years: County
- Kildare
Inter-county titles
- Leinster titles: 0
- All-Irelands: 0
- NFL: 0
- All Stars: 0

John Donnelly (born 1944) is an Irish former Gaelic football coach and player. At club level, he played with Ellistown and he was also a member of the Kildare senior football team.

== Playing career ==
Donnelly played his club Gaelic football with Ellistown. He was part of the team that won the Kildare IFC title in 1964 following a defeat of Maynooth in the final.

At inter-county level, Donnelly was part of the Kildare team that won consecutive Leinster U21FC titles as well as the All-Ireland U21FC title in 1965. He later spent several years with the senior team but lost four leinster SFC finals in 1966 and 1975. Donnelly also earned a call-up to the Leinster team for the Railway Cup.

== Post-playing career ==
Donnelly later became involved in team management and coaching. He was a long-time selector with the Kildare senior team. He was named in the right wing-forward position on Kildare's Team of the Millennium.

== Honours ==
Ellistown

- Kildare Intermediate Football Championship: 1964

Kildare

- All-Ireland Under-21 Football Championship: 1965
- Leinster Under-21 Football Championship: 1965, 1966
