= John McCarthy (Gaelic footballer) =

Irish Gaelic footballer (born 1955)

Personal information
- Native name: Seán Mac Cárthaigh (Irish)
- Born: 1955 (age 70–71)

Sport
- Sport: Gaelic football
- Position: Midfielder/Forward
Clubs
- Years: Club
- Garda; Na Fianna; Ballymun Kickhams
Inter-county
Years	County	Apps (scores)
1974–1981	Dublin	?
Inter-county titles
- Leinster titles: ?
- All-Irelands: 3

John McCarthy (born 1955) is a former Gaelic footballer who played at senior level for the Dublin county team, who making his championship debut in a defeat by Louth in a Leinster SFC Replay in 1973. However this would be his team's last defeat in the province until 1980. He was once described by former Donegal manager Brian McEniff as the most lethal of the six Dublin forwards.

== Playing career ==
=== Inter-county ===
In the period 1974 to 1979, McCarthy won three All Ireland medals in 1974, 1976 and 1977. McCarthy was a crucial figure in these years particularly in the 1976 All-Ireland Senior Football Championship Final against old rivals Kerry as McCarthy struck for the first goal to set Dublin on their way to victory. He proved to be a real thorn in Kerry's side as he was also fouled for the penalty which led to Dublin's second goal. He repeated the dose against Kerry in the classic semi-final of 1977 when he plundered Dublin's first goal shortly after half time. In the final of 1977, McCarthy was part of a Dublin full forward line that amassed all but two of the team's two points in a tally of 5-12 against Armagh.

=== Club ===
Throughout his career he played for three clubs Garda, Na Fianna and Ballymun Kickhams. He is currently a selector with Ballymun Kickhams senior team, which won the 2009 Dublin SFL (bridging a 20-year gap).

== Personal ==
MCCarthy was a Garda by profession based at Mountjoy and holds a unique record alongside Kerry's Aidan O'Mahony and Tom O'Sullivan within the force of being the only Gardaí to play in six successive All-Ireland finals. He retired from the Garda Síochána in 2005.

McCarthy's son named James also became a senior footballer with Dublin, winning the All-Ireland Senior Football Championship on nine occasions.
