= Seamus Aldridge =

Gaelic football referee

Personal information
- Born: 1935 (age 90–91)
- Years active: 1952–present
- Employer: GAA

Sport
- Sport: Gaelic football
- Position: Referee
- Club: Round Towers

Seamus Aldrdge (born 1935) is a Gaelic games administrator, Gaelic football referee and former player. He is a member of the Round Towers club in County Kildare.

== Career ==
Aldridge played for the Kildare minor football team. He played until the age of 29. He refereed his first match in 1958.

He began refereeing in 1963 after his playing career had concluded. He allowed Dublin player Éamonn Breslin's header into the goal at the Canal End of Croke Park twenty minutes into a National League game against Laois in 1964; this was the first header scored at Croker.

He referred the famous 1978 All-Ireland Senior Football Championship Final when Mikey Sheehy lobbed the goalie. Death threats followed. He has also refereed in hurling.

Aldridge first became involved in administration in 1952. He served in various roles: secretary and chairman of Kildare's Referees Committee; secretary (1975–2000) and treasurer (1976–2000) of the Kildare County Board. Aldridge spent 20 years as a delegate to the Leinster Council. He became vice chairman (1996–1999) and chairman (1999–2001) of the Leinster Council. He oversaw the managerial appointments of Mick O'Dwyer and Dermot Earley Snr, and then the reappointment of O'Dwyer in advance of the county's appearance in the 1998 All-Ireland Senior Football Championship Final. Central Council: GAA Management vice-president (1999–2001).

He ran for the position of President of the Gaelic Athletic Association, finishing as runner-up to Seán Kelly. He was later appointed President of Kildare County Board. Aldrigde was President of Kildare GAA during the 2018 over the Mayo fixture in Newbridge. the Newbridge or Nowhere".

== Personal life ==
Aldridge attended De La Salle and St Joseph's Academy (both in the town of Kildare) for his primary and secondary education respectively. Tom Keogh, an uncle of his, played for the Kildare county team that won the 1927 and 1928 All-Ireland Senior Football Championship titles, before he played for Laois.

Aldridge is Secretary of Athy Golf Club and Athy Rugby Club and a member of the Fine Gael political party.

== Honours ==
Round Towers

- Kildare Senior Football Championship (3)
- Kildare Intermediate Football Championship (1)
- Kildare Minor Football Championship (3)
- Kildare Under-16 Football Championship (2)
- Kildare Under-14 Football Championship (2)

Kildare

- Leinster Championship (1) : 1956
