= 1976 All-Ireland Senior Football Championship final =

- Event: 1976 All-Ireland Senior Football Championship
Dublin	Kerry
3–8 (17)	0–10 (10)
- Date: 26 September 1976
- Venue: Croke Park, Dublin
- Referee: Paddy Collins (Westmeath)
- Attendance: 73,588

The 1976 All-Ireland Senior Football Championship final was the 89th All-Ireland Final and the deciding match of the 1976 All-Ireland Senior Football Championship, an inter-county Gaelic football tournament for the top teams in Ireland.

This was one of six All-Ireland SFC finals contested by both Dublin and Kerry between 1974 and 1986, a period when one of either team always contested the decider.

== Match ==
This year's final was played on 26 September.

=== Summary ===
Dublin won the second of the famous Kerry–Dublin 1970s duels with a seven-point win, goals coming from John McCarthy, Jimmy Keaveney, and Brian Mullins. It was Dublin's first championship win over Kerry since 1934.

Dublin manager Kevin Heffernan declared: "I've waited 21 years for this".

Kerry blamed a cancelled training session. The players asked for this because of "fatigue" though they also wished to take up a Beamish and Crawford invitation to the Tralee Races.

=== Details ===
26 September 1976; Final	Dublin	3–8 – 0–10	Kerry	Croke Park, Dublin; Attendance: 73,588; Referee: Paddy Collins (Westmeath)
26 September 1976; Final	J Keaveney 1–2, J McCarthy 1–1, B Mullins 1–1, B Brogan 0–1, A O'Toole 0–1, T Hanahoe 0–1, D Hickey 0–1		M Sheehy 0–3, P Spillane 0–2, D Moran 0–2, M O'Sullivan 0–1, B Lynch 0–1, J Egan 0–1	Croke Park, Dublin; Attendance: 73,588; Referee: Paddy Collins (Westmeath)

Dublin
Kerry

==== Dublin ====
- 1 P. Cullen
- 2 G. O'Driscoll
- 3 S. Doherty
- 4 R. Kelleher
- 5 T. Drumm
- 6 K. Moran
- 7 P. O'Neill
- 8 B. Mullins
- 9 B. Brogan
- 10 A. O'Toole
- 11 T. Hanahoe (c)
- 12 D. Hickey
- 13 B. Doyle
- 14 J. Keaveney
- 15 J. McCarthy

Subs used
19 F. Ryder for T. Hanahoe
20 P. Gogarty for B. Doyle

Subs not used
16 J. Brogan
17 P. O'Reilly
18 P. Pocock
21 L. Deegan

Manager
K. Heffernan

==== Kerry ====
- 1 P. O'Mahony
- 2 G. O'Keeffe
- 3 J. O'Keeffe (c)
- 4 J. Deenihan
- 5 P. Ó Sé
- 6 T. Kennelly
- 7 G. Power
- 8 P. Lynch
- 9 P. McCarthy
- 10 D. Moran
- 11 M. Sheehy
- 12 M. O'Sullivan
- 13 B. Lynch
- 14 J. Egan
- 15 P. Spillane

Subs used
21 C. Nelligan for P. O'Mahony
16 S. Walsh for P. McCarthy
17 G. O'Driscoll for M. O'Sullivan

Subs not used
18 J. Long
19 A. O'Keeffe
20 J. Walsh
22 V. O'Connor
23 B. Walsh

Manager
M. O'Dwyer
