= Paddy Collins (referee) =

Gaelic football referee

- Full name: Paddy Collins
- Born: 1942 (age 83–84); Athboy, County Meath, Ireland

Patrick Collins (born 1942) is an Irish former Gaelic football referee and Gaelic games administrator. Born in Athboy, County Meath, Collins refereed the All-Ireland SFC finals of 1976, 1981, 1984 and 1989. A 2014 article in Hoganstand.com noted that he is regarded as "one of the top football referees of all time".

Páidí Ó Sé appointed him as a selector when he was made manager of the Westmeath senior football team in 2003, by which time Collins had long served as secretary of the Westmeath County Board.

Collins remained involved with the Westmeath senior team under Ó Sé's successor as manager Tomás Ó Flatharta, appointed in 2005.

Collins was also county secretary in 2000 when manager Brendan Lowry received a controversial six-month ban which was later lifted.

In 2022, Martin Breheny named him among "five of the best football referees".

Achievements
Preceded by John Moloney	All-Ireland Senior Football Final referee 1976	Succeeded by John Moloney
Preceded by Séamus Murray	All-Ireland Senior Football Final referee 1981	Succeeded by P. J. McGrath
Preceded by John Gough	All-Ireland Senior Football Final referee 1984	Succeeded by Paddy Kavanagh
Preceded by Tommy Sugrue	All-Ireland Senior Football Final referee 1989	Succeeded by Paddy Russell
