= 2010 Leinster Senior Football Championship =

The 2010 Leinster Senior Football Championship was that year's installment of the annual Leinster Senior Football Championship held under the auspices of the Leinster GAA. It was won by Meath who defeated Louth in an eventful final on 11 July. A contentious goal was given. Irate Louth fans pursued the referee around the pitch at the final whistle, bottles were hurled from the stand and the mayhem was compared to soccer player Thierry Henry's handball that cheated the Irish soccer team of their place at the 2010 FIFA World Cup the previous November.

The winning Meath team received the Delaney Cup, and automatically advanced to the quarter-final stage of the 2010 All-Ireland Senior Football Championship. Kildare beat them there.

== Bracket ==
Preliminary round
Louth	1-11
Longford	1-7
Wicklow	3-13
Carlow	0-12
Meath	1-20
Offaly	2-7

Quarter-finals
Louth	1-22
Kildare	1-16
Wicklow	1-11
Westmeath	0-15
Meath	2-14
Laois	0-10
Wexford	0-15
Dublin	2-16

Semi-finals
Louth	1-15
Westmeath	2-10
Meath	5-9
Dublin	0-13

Final
Louth	1-10
Meath	1-12

== Preliminary round ==
16 May 2010
Preliminary round

Wicklow	3-13 – 0-12	Carlow
L Glynn 1-4, T Hannon 0-6, P Earls, JP Dalton 1-0 each, S Furlong 0-2, P McWalter 0-1. N Mernagh SO	Report	S Rea 0-4, A Curran, B Murphy 0-3 each, JJ Smith, D St Ledger 0-1 each. B Murphy, T Walsh SO

O'Moore Park, Portlaoise
Referee: G. Kinneavy (Galway)
23 May 2010
Preliminary round

Meath	1-20 – 2-7	Offaly
C Ward 0-8 J Sheridan 1-3, S O'Rourke 0-4, S Bray 0-2, G O'Brien, N Crawford, B Farrell 0-1 each.	Report	K Casey 1-2, B Connor 1-0, N Darby 0-2, J Reynolds, N McNamee, A Sullivan 0-1 each. J Coughlan SO

O'Moore Park, Portlaoise
Referee: D. Fahy (Longford)
23 May 2010
Preliminary round

Louth	1-11 – 1-7	Longford
B White 0-4, S Lennon 1-0, C Judge, P Keenan, JP Rooney 0-2 each, D Byrne 0-1.	Report	B McElvaney 1-0, F McGee, S McCormack 0-2 each, P Foy, P Dowd, K Mulligan 0-1 each.

O'Moore Park, Portlaoise
Referee: P. Fox (Westmeath)

== Quarter-finals ==
5 June 2010
Quarter-final

Louth	1-22 - 1-16	Kildare
B White 0-6, C Judge, S Lennon 0-4 each, A McDonnell, JP Rooney 0-3 each, R Finnegan 1-0, M Brennan, A Reid 0-1 each.	Report	J Doyle 0-9, P O'Neill 1-1, J Kavanagh 0-2, D Flynn, D Whyte, R Sweeney, A Smith 0-1 each.

Páirc Tailteann, Navan
Referee: M. Duffy (Sligo)
6 June 2010
Quarter-final

Wicklow	1-11 - 0-15	Westmeath
T Hannon 0-5, P Earls 1-1, S Furling 0-2, C Hyland, D Hayden, N Mernagh 0-1 each. L Glynn SO	Report	M Flanagan, C Lynam, P Greville 0-3 each, D Glennon 0-2, P Bannon, M Ennis, D Harte, D Dolan 0-1 each. J Gaffey, D Duffy SO

O'Connor Park, Tullamore
Referee: M. Collins (Cork)
13 June 2010
Quarter-final

Meath	2-13 - 1-16 AET	Laois
G Reilly 1-4, J Sheridan 0-3, C McGuinness 1-0, C Ward, S O'Rourke 0-2 each, S Bray, C Gillespie 0-1 each.	Report	D Kingston 0-6, MJ Tierney 0-3, P McMahon 1-0, P Clancy, J O'Loughlin 0-2 each, C Healy, D Strong, R Munnelly 0-1 each.

Croke Park, Dublin
Attendance: 49,757
Referee: M. Duffy (Sligo)
13 June 2010
Quarter-final

Wexford	0-15 - 2-16 AET	Dublin
M Forde 0-7, S Roche, R Barry 0-2 each, E Bradley, A Flynn, C Lyng, PJ Banville 0-1 each.	Report	B Brogan 2-4, T Quinn 0-4, C Keaney, A Brogan 0-2 M McAuley, P Flynn, B Cullen, K Nolan 0-1 each.

Croke Park, Dublin
Attendance: 49,757
Referee: M. Haggins (Fermanagh)
19 June 2010
Quarter-final replay

Meath	2-14 - 0-10	Laois
J Sheridan 2-2, G Reilly 0-4, C Ward, S O'Rourke 0-3 each, C King, B Meade 0-1 each.	Report	MJ Tierney 0-4, D Kingston 0-2, P O'Leary, P McMahon, C Healy, D Strong 0-1 each.

O'Connor Park, Tullamore
Attendance: 12,659
Referee: M. Condon (Waterford)

== Semi-finals ==
27 June 2010
Semi-final

Louth	1-15 - 2-10	Westmeath
C Judge 1-2, B White 0-4, P Keenan 0-3, S Lennon 0-2, M Brennan, A Reid, P Smith, D Maguire 0-1 each	Report	P Greville 0-5, P Bannon 1-1, M Flanagan 1-0, D Glennon 0-2, D Dolan, G Egan 0-1 each

Croke Park, Dublin
Attendance: 60,035
Referee: S. Doyle (Wexford)
27 June 2010
Semi-final

Dublin	0-13 - 5-9	Meath
T Quinn 0-7, B Brogan 0-3, B Cullen, C Keaney, K McManamon 0-1 each	Report	S Bray 2-1, C Ward 1-4, J Sheridan, B Farrell 1-0 each, S O'Rourke 0-3, G Reilly 0-1

Croke Park, Dublin
Attendance: 60,035
Referee: P. Hughes (Armagh)

== Final ==
11 July 2010
Final

Louth	1-10 - 1-12	Meath
B White 0-4, JP Rooney 1-1, C Judge 0-2, P Keenan, A Reed, A McDonnell 0-1 each	Report	G Reilly, C Ward 0-4 each, J Sheridan 1-0, S Bray 0-2, A Moyles 0-1

Croke Park, Dublin
Attendance: 48,875
Referee: M. Sludden (Tyrone)
