= List of Offaly inter-county footballers =

This is a very incomplete list of Gaelic footballers who have played at senior level for the Offaly county team.

== List of players ==
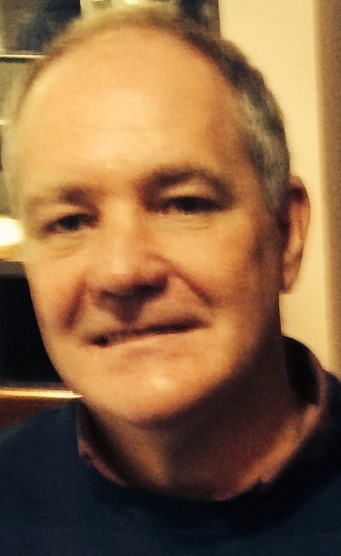
Matt Connor

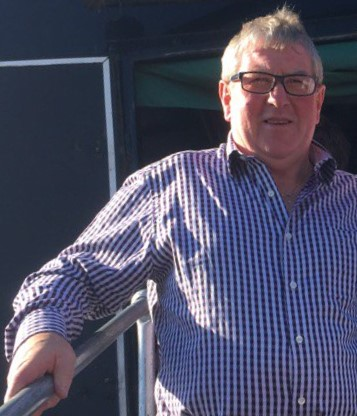
Séamus Darby

=== A–D ===
- Vinny Claffey: 17 years, until 2003; 1997 Leinster SFC and 1998 NFL winner
- Nicholas Clavin: All-Ireland SFC winner
- Matt Connor: remembered for his role in the 1980 All-Ireland SFC semi-final, he was also part of the winning team in the 1982 All-Ireland SFC final
- Richie Connor: captained the 1982 All-Ireland SFC-winning team
- Larry Coughlan: twice an All-Ireland SFC winner
- Finbarr Cullen: lost three of his teeth during a game against Dublin in 1997
- Tommy Cullen: father of Finbarr
- Cathal Daly: 1997 All Star
- Peter Daly: twice a Leinster SFC winner
- Séamus Darby: scored the only goal of the 1982 All-Ireland SFC final, "the most famous goal in the history of Gaelic football"
- Harry Donnelly: twice a Leinster SFC winner
- Nigel Dunne: from 2010 until 2025

=== E–L ===
- Johnny Egan: from 1957 until 1970, played 99 times in league and championship
- Paddy Fenning: scored the only goal of the 1972 All-Ireland SFC final replay
- Seán Foran: played 82 times in league and championship
- Martin Furlong: three-time All-Ireland SFC-winning, four-time All Star goalkeeper
- Seán Grennan
- John Guinan: All-Ireland SFC winner in 1982
- Donie Hanlon: captained Offaly to the 1960 Leinster SFC title
- Martin Heavey: twice an All-Ireland SFC winner
- Ambrose Hickey: played in the 1969 All-Ireland SFC final
- Greg Hughes: Leinster SFC winner in 1960
- Pascal Kelleghan
- Pádraic Kelly: from 1994 until 2009, goalkeeper who won 1997 Leinster SFC and 1998 NFL titles
- Kevin Kilmurray: twice an All-Ireland SFC winner
- Brendan Lowry: 1982 All-Ireland SFC winner
- Mick Lowry: 1982 All-Ireland SFC winner
- Seán Lowry: three-time All-Ireland SFC winner, twice an All Star

=== M ===
- Roy Malone: 1997 Leinster SFC winner, scorer of two goals against Meath in the final
- Ciaran McManus: 1997 Leinster SFC winner
- Niall McNamee
- Ruairí McNamee: from 2016 until 2025
- Tony McTague: captained Offaly to the 1972 All-Ireland SFC title

=== N–Z ===
- Liam O'Connor: 1982 All-Ireland SFC winner, set up Séamus Darby for the only goal of the final
- Dónal O'Neill: goalkeeper who deputised for the injured Martin Furlong in 1985
- Mick O'Rourke: twice an All-Ireland SFC winner
- Mick Ryan: twice an All-Ireland SFC winner, twice an All Star
- Seán Ryan: twice a Leinster SFC winner
- Anton Sullivan: included on the 2022 Tailteann Cup Team of the Year
