= Murt Connor =

Offaly Gaelic footballer

Personal information
- Native name: Muireartach Ó Conchubhair (Irish)
- Born: 1951 (age 74–75) Walsh Island, County Offaly, Ireland
- Occupation: Retired primary school principal
- Height: 6 ft 2 in (188 cm)

Sport
- Sport: Gaelic football
- Position: Left corner-forward
Clubs
- Years: Club
- Walsh Island; Éire Óg
Club titles
- Offaly titles: 6
- Leinster titles: 2
Inter-county*
Years	County	Apps (scores)
1969–1976	Offaly	16 (8–15)
Inter-county titles
- Leinster titles: 3
- All-Irelands: 2
- NFL: 0
- All Stars: 0
- *Inter County team apps and scores correct as of 14:22, 15 June 2016.

Mortimer "Murt" Connor (born 1951) is an Irish former Gaelic footballer who played as a left corner-forward for the Offaly senior team.

Born in Walsh Island, County Offaly, Connor first played competitive Gaelic football in his youth. He came to prominence at underage levels with the Walsh Island club. Connor later won two Leinster Club SFC medals and six Offaly SFC medals with the Walsh Island senior team. He also played for Éire Óg.

Connor made his debut on the inter-county scene at the age of seventeen when he first linked up with the Offaly minor team. He later played for the under-21 team, winning a Leinster U21FC medal. Connor made his senior debut during the 1969–70 league. He went on to play a key role for Offaly in attack during a hugely successful era, and won two All-Ireland SFC medals and three Leinster SFC medals.

Though a member of the Leinster inter-provincial team on a number of occasions, Connor never won a Railway Cup medal. Throughout his inter-county career Connor made 16 championship appearances. He retired from inter-county football during the 1975–76 league.

Connor is a member of a famous Gaelic football dynasty in Offaly. His father, Jim Connor, and his uncle, Tommy O'Connor, played with Offaly during the 1930s and 1940s, while his brothers, Matt, Richie and Séamus also played for Offaly throughout the 1970s and 1980s. His cousins, Liam O'Connor and Willie Bryan, were also All-Ireland medal winners with Offaly.

== Honours ==
Walsh Island

- Leinster Senior Club Football Championship (2): 1979, 1980
- Offaly Senior Club Football Championship (6): 1978, 1979, 1980, 1981, 1982, 1983

Offaly

- All-Ireland Senior Football Championship (2): 1971, 1972
- Leinster Senior Football Championship (3): 1971, 1972, 1973 (sub)
