= 1984 All-Ireland Senior Football Championship =

Football championship

Championship details
- Dates: 13 May – 23 September 1984
- Teams: 32

All-Ireland Champions
- Winning team: Kerry (28th win)
- Captain: Ambrose O'Donovan
- Manager: Mick O'Dwyer

All-Ireland Finalists
- Losing team: Dublin
- Captain: Tommy Drumm
- Manager: Kevin Heffernan

Provincial Champions
- Munster: Kerry
- Leinster: Dublin
- Ulster: Tyrone
- Connacht: Galway

Championship statistics
- No. matches played: 34
- Top Scorer: Barney Rock (5–24)
- Player of the Year: Jack O'Shea

The 1984 All-Ireland Senior Football Championship was the 98th staging of the All-Ireland Senior Football Championship, the Gaelic Athletic Association's premier inter-county Gaelic football tournament. The championship began on 13 May 1984 and ended on 23 September 1984.

Dublin entered the championship as the defending champions.

On 23 September 1984, Kerry won the championship following a 0–14 to 1–6 defeat of Dublin in the All-Ireland final. This was their 28th All-Ireland title.

Dublin's Barney Rock was the championship's top scorer with 5–24. Kerry's Jack O'Shea was the choice for Texaco Footballer of the Year.

== Centenary year ==
1984 was a special year in the annals of Gaelic games as it was the centenary of the foundation of the Gaelic Athletic Association. Because of this a series of events celebrating the occasion were planned to take place throughout the year. The festivities were officially launched on 18 March at the Michael Cusack cottage in Carron, County Clare. Ash trees were planted to mark the occasion and a plaque was also unveiled in memory of the founder of the association. The Railway Cup finals were later played in Cusack Park, Ennis.

A £100,000 film was also commissioned by the centenary committee. Made by Louis Marcus the film was designed to be a portrait rather than a chronological history of the GAA.

== Results ==
=== Connacht Senior Football Championship ===
Quarter-finals

3 June 1984 Quarter-final	London	0–10 – 3–16	Galway	Emerald GAA Grounds, Ruislip
	B O'Dwyer 0–3, J McPartland 0–2, D Diggins 0–1, F McHale 0–1, B Vaughan 0–1, B Grealish 0–1, P Canavan 0–1.		S Joyce 0–8, K Clancy 2–0, V Daly 1–0, M Brennan 0–3, L Higgins 0–2, P Conroy 0–2, B Talty 0–1.	Referee: P Egan (Leitrim)

10 June 1984 Quarter-final	Leitrim	1–14 – 0–9	Sligo	Páirc Sheáin Mhic Dhiarmada, Carrick-on-Shannon
	M Martin 1–3, K McKeown 0–4, F Smith 0–2, J Reynolds 0–2, S Mulhern 0–1, M Quinn 0–1, J Ward 0–1.		T Mahon 0–5, S Durkin 0–1, John Kent 0–1, J Stenson 0–1, M McCarrick 0–1.	Referee: S MacManamon (Galway)

Semi-finals

17 June 1984 Semi-final	Galway	1–17 – 0–7	Roscommon	Tuam Stadium, Tuam
	B O'Donnell 0–4, K Clancy 1–0, G McManus 0–3, S Joyce 0–3, V Daly 0–3, M Brennan 0–1, T Tierney 0–1, B Talty 0–1, P Conroy 0–1.		D Earley 0–5, S Hayden 0–1, T McManus 0–1.	Attendance: 8,000; Referee: M Kearins (Sligo)

24 June 1984 Semi-final	Mayo	3–16 – 1–8	Leitrim	McHale Park, Castlebar
	A Finnerty 2–2, T Byrne 1–5, K McStay 0–5, H Gavin 0–3, D Flanagan 0–1.		M Quinn 1–0, J Reynolds 0–3, R Dolan 0–2, J Ward 0–1, S McManus 0–1, S Mulhern 0–1.	Attendance: 12,832; Referee: S Mullaney (Roscommon)

Final

8 July 1984 Final	Galway	2–13 – 2–9	Mayo	Pearse Stadium, Galway
	S Joyce 1–5, B Talty 1–1, M Brennan 0–3, B O'Donnell 0–2, P O'Neill 0–1, G McManus 0–1.		K McStay 1–7, J Burke 1–0, H Gavin 0–1, M Carney 0–1.	Attendance: 17,560; Referee: M Kearins (Sligo)

=== Leinster Senior Football Championship ===
Preliminary round

13 May 1984 Preliminary round	Carlow	1–6 – 1–12	Laois	Dr. Cullen Park, Carlow
	J Owens 1–1, T Dwyer 0–3, W Cullen 0–1, W Doyle 0–1.		S Ramsbottom 0–9, P Doran 1–0, C Browne 0–1, S Dempsey 0–1, E Whelan 0–1.	Referee: T Jordan (Dublin)

20 May 1984 Preliminary round	Wicklow	1–9 – 4–4	Longford	Aughrim Park, Aughrim
	P Baker 0–5, P Tyrrell 1–1, P O'Byrne 0–2, J Lynch 0–1.		J McCormack 2–2, E McCormack 1–1, K O'Rourke 1–0, M O'Hara 0–1.

27 May 1984 Preliminary round	Westmeath	1–5 – 2–15	Meath	Cusack Park, Mullingar
	W Lowry 1–1, E Coughlan 0–2, M Lowry 0–1, S Hayes 0–1.		C O'Rourke 1–2, JJ McCormack 1–2, L Smith 0–3, F Murtagh 0–3, C Coyle 0–2, M McCabe 0–2, B Flynn 0–1.	Referee: J Gunning (Offaly)

Quarter-finals

3 June 1984 Quarter-final	Kildare	0–7 – 1–10	Laois	St. Conleth's Park, Newbridge
	L Tompkins 0–4, G Power 0–2, G Donnelly 0–1.		P Doran 1–4, J Ramsbottom 0–4, G Browne 0–1, B Miller 0–1.	Referee: P Kavanagh (Meath)

3 June 1984 Quarter-final	Meath	1–12 – 0–10	Louth	Páirc Tailteann, Navan
	L Smith 1–4, F Murtagh 0–3, C O'Rourke 0–2, L Hayes 0–1, G McEntee 0–1, M McCabe 0–1.		J McDonnell 0–5, R Culhane 0–2, R Quinn 0–2, E Cluskey 0–1.	Attendance: 14,000; Referee: C Buckley (Offaly)

10 June 1984 Quarter-final	Longford	0–15 – 1–12	Offaly	Pearse Park, Longford
	J McCormack 0–7, K O'Rourke 0–4, G Clarke 0–2, M O'Hara 0–1, M Duggan 0–1.		M Connor 0–9, J Mooney 1–2, A O'Halloran 0–1.	Attendance: 10,000; Referee: P Collins (Westmeath)

10 June 1984 Quarter-final	Dublin	4–12 – 0–9	Wexford	Croke Park, Dublin
	B Rock 2–4, K Duff 1–2, J McNally 1–1, T Conroy 0–2, J Ronayne 0–1, B Mullins 0–1, J Caffrey 0–1.		E Mahon 0–2, G O'Connor 0–2, N Swords 0–2, M Quigley 0–1, James McGovern 0–1, M Henrick 0–1.	Attendance: 16,025; Referee: K Campbell (Meath)

17 June 1984 Quarter-final replay	Offaly	3–15 – 3–10	Longford	Croke Park, Dublin
	M Connor 2–5, B Lowry 1–4, A O'Halloran 0–2, S Darby 0–2, J Mooney 0–1, P Dunne 0–1.		J McCormack 0–7, F McNamee 2–0, D Barry 1–1, M O'Hara 0–2.	Attendance: 33,061; Referee: P Collins (Westmeath)

Semi-finals

24 June 1984 Semi-final	Dublin	0–13 – 0–5	Offaly	Croke Park, Dublin
	B Rock 0–4, K Duff 0–2, A O'Toole 0–2, J McNally 0–1, T Conroy 0–1, B Mullins 0–1, PJ Buckley 0–1, J Ronayne 0–1.		M Connor 0–3, B Lowry 0–1, J Mooney 0–1.	Attendance: 38,101; Referee: P Kavanagh (Meath)

24 June 1984 Semi-final	Meath	3–15 – 3–10	Laois	Croke Park, Dublin
	F Murtagh 0–8, M McCabe 1–3, C O'Rourke 1–3, B Tansey 1–0, L Smith 0–1.		C Browne 2–0, S Dempsey 1–2, J Ramsbottom 0–4, G Lawlor 0–2, G Browne 0–1, R Miller 0–1.	Attendance: 38,101; Referee: S Aldridge (Kildare)

Final

22 July 1984 Final	Dublin	2–10 – 1–9	Meath	Croke Park, Dublin
	Barney Rock 1–4 (0-3f), Kieran Duff 1–4, Anton O'Toole and Joe McNally 0–1 each		Ben Tansey 1–0, Liam Smith 0-3f, Mattie McCabe 0–2, Martin O'Connell (1 '50), Liam Hayes, Colm O'Rourke, Bernard Flynn 0–1 each	Attendance: 56,051; Referee: J Gunning (Offaly)

=== Munster Senior Football Championship ===
Quarter-finals

20 May 1984 Quarter-final	Waterford	1–6 – 0–9	Tipperary	Fraher Field, Dungarvan
	P Whyte 1–1, J Maher 0–3, E O'Brien 0–1, M Hogan 0–1.		F Kelly 0–3, O Maher 0–2, T Carr 0–2, J O'Donnell 0–1, B Conway 0–1.	Referee: E Porter (Cork)

27 May 1984 Quarter-final replay	Tipperary	4–13 – 0–10	Waterford	Semple Stadium, Thurles
	B Conway 1–4, F Kelly 1–4, E O'Dwyer 1–2, J O'Donnell 1–0, O Maher 0–2, K Barron 0–1.		J Maher 0–4, J Casey 0–3, E O'Brien 0–1, P Keating 0–1, C McGrath 0–1.	Referee: E Porter (Cork)

27 May 1984 Quarter-final	Clare	0–10 – 1–7	Limerick	Semple Stadium, Thurles
	N Normoyle 0–3, Pat McNamara 0–2, T Tubridy 0–2, P Burke 0–1, J Roche 0–1, D Casey 0–1.		M Quish 1–2, F Ryan 0–2, R Doherty 0–1, P Barrett 0–1, T Lenihan 0–1.	Referee: T Sugrue (Kerry)

3 June 1984 Quarter-final replay	Limerick	0–10 – 2–5	Clare	Gaelic Grounds, Limerick
	R O'Doherty 0–3, F Ryan 0–2, D Fitzgibbon 0–1, M Quish 0–1, F Brosnahan 0–1, T Browne 0–1, T Cummins 0–1.		P McNamara 0–4, D O'Loughlin 1–0, P Burke 1–0, T Tubridy 0–1.	Referee: T Sugrue (Kerry)

Semi-finals

10 June 1984 Semi-final	Kerry	0–23 – 0–6	Tipperary	Austin Stack Park, Tralee
	J Kennedy 0–6, T O'Dowd 0–4, M Sheehy 0–4, E Liston 0–4, P Spillane 0–3, J O'Shea 0–1, D O'Donoghue 0–1.		J O'Donnell 0–2, F Kelly 0–2, O Maher 0–1, B Conway 0–1.	Attendance: 4,500; Referee: R Moloney (Limerick)

17 June 1984 Semi-final	Cork	3–11 – 1–5	Clare	Semple Stadium, Thurles
	D Allen 2–0, E O'Mahony 1–3, D Barry 0–3, J Cleary 0–3, M Lynch 0–1, T Nation 0–1.		G Killeen 1–0, P McNamara 0–1, J McGrath 0–1, N Normoyle 0–1, P Burke 0–1, F Mescall 0–1.	Referee: T Sugrue (Kerry)

Final

1 July 1984 Final	Kerry	3–14 – 2–10	Cork	Fitzgerald Stadium, Killarney
	P Spillane 2–0, J Kennedy 0–4, W Maher 1–0, M Sheehy 0–3, D Moran 0–2, G Power 0–2, J O'Shea 0–1, T Spillane 0–1, E Liston 0–1.		D Barry 1–4, B Coffey 1–0, M Burns 0–2, C Corrigan 0–1, J Kerrigan 0–1, D Allen 0–1, J Allen 0–1.	Attendance: 36,258; Referee: J Moloney (Tipperary)

=== Ulster Senior Football Championship ===
Preliminary round

27 May 1984 Preliminary round	Cavan	0–13 – 1–13	Derry	Breffni Park, Cavan
	D Donohoe 0–3, M McEntee 0–3, M Faulkner 0–2, J Reilly 0–1, B Tierney 0–1, R Cullivan 0–1, D McDonnell 0–1, A King 0–1.		G Bradley 1–3, D Cassidy 0–5, Dermot McNicholl 0–2, D Barron 0–1, E Young 0–1, Declan McNicholl 0–1.	Referee: J Heaney (Tyrone)

Quarter-finals

20 May 1984 Quarter-final	Down	3–6 – 0–8	Fermanagh	Pairc Esler, Newry
	B Mason 1–1, L Austin 1–1, L Heaney 1–0, J Treanor 0–2, M Linden 0–2.		P McGinnity 0–4, T Maguire 0–2, Dom Corrigan 0–1, K Corrigan 0–1.

27 May 1984 Quarter-final	Antrim	1–6 – 2–17	Monaghan	Casement Park, Belfast
	A McQuillan 1–1, K Gough 0–2, M Darragh 0–1, K McAllister 0–1, G Higgins 0–1.		B Murray 1–4, R McDermott 1–1, R McCarron 0–4, E Hughes 0–3, E McEneaney 0–2, M Caulfield 0–2, H Clerkin 0–1.

3 June 1984 Quarter-final	Armagh	1–10 – 0–12	Donegal	Athletic Grounds, Armagh
	J Corvan 0–5, G Houlihan 1–1, B Hughes 0–1, P Rafferty 0–1, T Coleman 0–1, C Harney 0–1.		G Curran 0–5, S Maguire 0–3, B Murray 0–2, M Lafferty 0–1, D Reid 0–1.	Referee: J Gough (Antrim)

10 June 1984 Quarter-final	Derry	3–4 – 1–13	Tyrone	Dean McGlinchey Park, Ballinascreen
	G Bradley 2–0, Dermot McNicholl 1–1, D CAssidy 0–2, Declan McNicholl 0–1.		F McGUigan 0–6, D O'Hagan 1–2, E McKenna 0–3, P O'Neill 0–1, K McCabe 0–1.	Referee: D Campbell (Fermanagh)

Semi-finals

17 June 1984 Semi-final	Armagh	2–8 – 0–9	Monaghan	Breffni Park, Cavan
	Coleman 1–0, G Houlihan 1–0, J Corvan 0–2, F McMahon 0–2, Kiernan 0–2, J McCorry 0–1, Hughes 0–1.		McCarron 0–3, Finlay 0–2, Hughes 0–2, Murphy 0–1, Clerkin 0–1.	Referee: D Campbell (Fermanagh)

24 June 1984 Semi-final	Tyrone	0–10 – 0–5	Down	Casement Park, Belfast
	D O'Hagan 0–5, P Kerlin 0–2, F McGuigan 0–2, S Daly 0–1.		J Treanor 0–2, P Browne 0–1, G Blaney 0–1, A Rodgers 0–1.	Attendance: 10,000; Referee: M Greenan (Cavan)

Final

15 July 1984 Final	Tyrone	0–15 – 1–7	Armagh	St. Tiernach's Park, Clones
	F McGuigan 0–11, E McKenna 0–1, P Kerlin 0–1, C Donaghy 0–1, N McGlinn 0–1.		G Houlihan 1–1, J Corvan 0–3, F McMahon 0–1, J McCorry 0–1, J McKerr 0–1.	Attendance: 25,000

=== All-Ireland Senior Football Championship ===
Semi-finals

12 August 1984 Semi-final	Kerry	2–17 – 0–11	Galway	Croke Park, Dublin
	M Sheehy 1–4, J Egan 1–2, J O'Shea 0–5, P Spillane 0–3, K Kennedy 0–1, A O'Donovan 0–1, T Spillane 0–1.		T Tierney 0–3, P Kelly 0–2, V Daly 0–2, G McMnaus 0–1, M Brennan 0–1, P Conory 0–1, B O'Donnell 0–1.	Attendance: 19,248; Referee: S Murray (Monaghan)

22 August 1984 Semi-final	Dublin	2–11 – 0–8	Tyrone	Croke Park, Dublin
	B Rock 1–7, J McNally 1–0, B Mullins 0–1, T Conroy 0–1, C Duff 0–1, C Sutton 0–1.		F McGuigan 0–4, E McKenna 0–2, P O'Neill 0–1, C Donaghy 0–1.	Attendance: 39,915; Referee: PJ McGrath (Mayo)

Final

23 September 1984 Final	Kerry	0–14 – 1–6	Dublin	Croke Park, Dublin
	J Kennedy 0–5, P Spillane 0–4, E Liston 0–3, J O'Shea 0–1, D Moran 0–1.		B Rock 1–5, T Conroy 0–1.	Attendance: 68,365; Referee: P Collins (Westmeath)

== Championship statistics ==
=== Miscellaneous ===
- For the first time in years there were 2 draws and replays in the Munster football championship Quarter-finals.
- Tyrone are Ulster champions for the first time since 1973.
- The All Ireland semi-final between Dublin vs Tyrone was their first championship meeting.

=== Scoring ===
Overall

Rank	Player	County	Tally	Total	Matches	Average
1	Barney Rock	Dublin	5–24	39	5	7.80
2	Matt Connor	Offaly	2–17	26	3	8.66
3	Frank McGuigan	Tyrone	0–23	23	4	5.75
4	John McCormack	Longford	2–16	22	3	7.33
5	Stephen Joyce	Galway	1–16	19	4	4.75
6	John Ramsbottom	Laois	0–17	17	3	5.66
7	John Kennedy	Kerry	0–16	16	4	4.00
8	Kieran Duff	Dublin	2–9	15	5	3.00
8	Kevin McStay	Mayo	1–12	15	2	7.50
10	Finian Murtagh	Meath	0–14	14	3	4.66
10	Mikey Sheehy	Kerry	1–11	14	4	3.50

Top scorers in a single game

Rank	Player	Team	Tally	Total	Opposition
1	Matt Connor	Offaly	2–5	11	Longford
1	Frank McGuigan	Tyrone	0–11	11	Armagh
3	Barney Rock	Dublin	2–4	10	Wexford
3	Kevin McStay	Mayo	1–7	10	Galway
3	Barney Rock	Dublin	1–7	10	Tyrone
6	John Ramsbottom	Laois	0–9	9	Carlow
6	Matt Connor	Offaly	0–9	9	Longford
8	Anthony Finnerty	Mayo	2–2	8	Leitrim
8	John McCormack	Longford	2–2	8	Wicklow
8	Barney Rock	Dublin	1–5	8	Kerry
8	Tom Byrne	Mayo	1–5	8	Leitrim
8	Stephen Joyce	Galway	1–5	8	Mayo
8	Finian Murtagh	Meath	0–8	8	Laois
8	Stephen Joyce	Galway	0–8	8	London
