= 1961 All-Ireland Senior Football Championship final =

- Event: 1961 All-Ireland Senior Football Championship
Down	Offaly
3–6 (15)	2–8 (14)
- Date: 24 September 1961
- Venue: Croke Park, Dublin
- Referee: L Maguire (Cavan)
- Attendance: 90,556

The 1961 All-Ireland Senior Football Championship final was the 74th All-Ireland Final and the deciding match of the 1961 All-Ireland Senior Football Championship, an inter-county Gaelic football tournament for the top teams in Ireland. A crowd of 90,556 (a record at the old Croke Park) watched the match between Down and Offaly.

== Match ==
=== Summary ===
The biggest crowd ever to attend Croke Park saw an explosive opening to the match - Offaly's Mick Casey and Peter Daly got goals to put them six points ahead with the match barely begun. Down recovered with three goals by half-time, and led by two points with minutes to go. Har Donnelly had a 21-yard free for Offaly, and took a point when a goal was really needed.

This was Down's second appearance in an All-Ireland SFC final, and their second win from two. It was the second of three All-Ireland SFC titles won by Down in the 1960s, which made them joint "team of the decade" with Galway who also won three.

=== Details ===
24 September 1961

Down	3–6 – 2–8	Offaly
J. McCartan, S. O'Neill 1-1, B. Morgan 1-0, P. Doherty & T. Hadden 0-2.		M. Casey, P. Daly 1-0, H. Donnelly 0-6, Ti Cullen & S. Brereton 0-1.

Croke Park, Dublin
Attendance: 90,556
Referee: L Maguire (Cavan)

==== Down ====
- 1 E. McKay
- 2 G. Lavery
- 3 L. Murphy
- 4 P. Rice
- 5 P. O'Hagan
- 6 D. McCartan
- 7 J. Smith
- 8 J. Carey
- 9 J. Lennon
- 10 S. O'Neill
- 11 J. McCartan
- 12 P. Doherty (c)
- 13 T. Hadden
- 14 P. J. McElroy
- 15 B. Morgan

Subs used
K. O'Neill for P. Rice
P. Rice for G. Lavery

Manager
B. Carr

==== Offaly ====
- 1 W. Nolan (c)
- 2 P. McCormack
- 3 G. Hughes
- 4 J. Egan
- 5 P. O'Reilly
- 6 M. Brady
- 7 C. Wrenn
- 8 S. Brereton
- 9 S. Ryan
- 10 T. Cullen
- 11 P. Daly
- 12 T. Greene
- 13 M. Casey
- 14 D. Hanlon
- 15 H. Donnelly

Subs used
F. Weir for M. Casey
S. Foran for S. Ryan
F. Higgins for P. O'Reilly

Trainer
P. O'Reilly
