= 1971 All-Ireland Senior Football Championship =

Football championship

Championship details
- Dates: 25 April – 26 September 1971
- Teams: 31

All-Ireland Champions
- Winning team: Offaly (1st win)
- Captain: Willie Bryan
- Manager: Fr. Tom Scully

All-Ireland Finalists
- Losing team: Galway
- Captain: Liam Sammon
- Manager: John "Tull" Dunne

Provincial Champions
- Munster: Cork
- Leinster: Offaly
- Ulster: Down
- Connacht: Galway

Championship statistics
- No. matches played: 32
- Top Scorer: Tony McTague (1–35)
- Player of the Year: Eugene Mulligan

The 1971 All-Ireland Senior Football Championship was the 85th staging of the All-Ireland Senior Football Championship, the Gaelic Athletic Association's premier inter-county Gaelic football tournament. The championship began on 25 April 1971 and ended on 26 September 1971.

Kerry entered the championship as the defending champions, however, they were defeated by Cork in the Munster final.

On 26 September 1971, Offaly won the championship following a 1–14 to 2–8 defeat of Galway in the All-Ireland final. This was their first All-Ireland title.

Offaly's Tony McTague was the championship's top scorer with 1–35. Offaly's Eugene Mulligan was the choice for Texaco Footballer of the Year.

== Leinster Championship format change ==
The Second Round returns to Leinster football championship this year.

== Results ==
=== Connacht Senior Football Championship ===
Quarter-final

13 June 1971 Quarter-final	Mayo	5–7 – 2–4	Leitrim	Fr. O'Hara Park, Charlestown
	D Griffith 2–1, J Carey 1–1, J Corcoran 0–4, T Fitzgerald 1–0, PJ Loftus 1–0, J Gibbons 0–1.		M Doorigan 1–0, R Prendergast 1–0 og, P Dolan 0–2, B Wrynne 0–2.	Referee: P O'Connor (Roscommon)

Semi-finals

20 June 1971 Semi-final	Roscommon	1–5 – 0–10	Sligo	Dr. Hyde Park, Roscommon
	A O'Sullivan 1–0, T Kenny 0–3, M Fallon 0–1, J Keane 0–1.		M Kearins 0–7, M Brennan 0–2, G Mitchell 0–1.	Referee: M Connaughton (Mayo)

27 June 1971 Semi-final	Galway	1–7 – 0–7	Mayo	Tuam Stadium, Tuam
	F Canavan 1–0, L Sammon 0–3, M Ferrick 0–1, E Farrell 0–1, S Leydon 0–1, J Duggan 0–1.		J Corcoran 0–5, J Nealon 0–1, J Carey 0–1.	Referee: R Barry (Meath)

Finals

11 July 1971 Final	Galway	2–15 – 2–15	Sligo	MacHale Park, Castlebar
	J McLoughlin 0–8, S Leydon 1–3, F Canavan 1–1, P Burke 0–1, M Rooney 0–1, C McDonagh 0–1.		M Kearins 0–13, P Brennan 2–0, G Mitchell 0–1, H Quinn 0–1.	Attendance: 19,764; Referee: J Martin (Roscommon)

25 July 1971 Final replay	Galway	1–17 – 3–10	Sligo	MacHale Park, Castlebar
	S Leydon 1–7, F Canavan 0–4, J McLoughlin 0–4, W Joyce 0–1, E Farrell 0–1.		G Mitchell 2–1, M Kearins 0–7, D Pugh 1–0, J Gilmartin 0–1, H Quinn 0–1.	Attendance: 20,000; Referee: J Martin (Roscommon)

=== Leinster Senior Football Championship ===
First round

25 April 1971 First round	Wicklow	2–8 – 0–6	Wexford	Dr. Cullen Park, Carlow

2 May 1971 First round	Laois	4–12 – 2–7	Carlow	St. Conleth's Park, Newbridge
	E Condron 1–7, S Allen 1–2, B Delaney 1–0, S Lawler 1–0, J Conway 0–2, K Brennan 0–1.		B McNally 1–3, S King 1–2, B Hayden 0–1, P McNally 0–1.	Referee: M Spain (Offaly)

Second round

23 May 1971 Second round	Laois	2–9 – 2–5	Wicklow	Dr. Cullen Park, Carlow
	S Allen 1–1, B Lawlor 0–2, H Mulhaire 0–2, B Delaney 0–1, E Condron 0–1, W Miller 0–1, J Lawlor 0–1.		P Clarke 1–0, P Kelly 1–0, S Kelly 0–2, D Byrne 0–2, J Doyle 0–1.	Referee: P Kelly (Dublin)

Quarter-finals

2 May 1971 Quarter-final	Meath	1–14 – 0–9	Westmeath	O'Connor Park, Tullamore
	N Curran 1–4, M Fay 0–2, A Burns 0–2, K Rennicks 0–2, T Brennan 0–2, M Kerrigan 0–1, M Mellett 0–1.		P Buckley 0–3, M Fagan 0–2, J Carolan 0–1, F Connaughton 0–1, M Carley 0–1, D Dolan 0–1.	Referee: P Kelly (Dublin)

9 May 1971 Quarter-final	Offaly	1–7 – 0–3	Longford	Cusack Park, Mullingar
	T McTague 0–7, S Cooney 1–0.		J Hanniffy 0–2, P Burke 0–1.	Referee: P Kelly (Dublin)

30 May 1971 Quarter-final	Louth	1–7 – 1–7	Kildare	Croke Park, Dublin
	M McKeown 1–1, M Leech 0–3, B Gaughran 0–2, W Murphy 0–1.		P Dunny 1–2, J Goulding 0–2, M Kelly 0–1, T Carew 0–1, J Donnelly 0–1.	Referee: P Kelly (Dublin)

6 June 1971 Quarter-final	Laois	3–8 – 0–13	Dublin	Dr. Cullen Park, Carlow
	J Lawlor 2–2, S Allen 1–0, E Condron 0–3, B Delaney 0–2, H Mulhaire 0–1.		T O'Hanlon 0–5, J Keaveney 0–4, J O'Reilly 0–2, F Murray 0–1, D Hickey 0–1.	Referee: M Spain (Offaly)

13 June 1971 Quarter-final replay	Kildare	0–11 – 1–5	Louth	Croke Park, Dublin
	J Donnelly 0–5, T Carew 0–2, P Dunny 0–2, E O'Donoghue 0–1, K Kelly 0–1.		M Keown 1–0, B Gaughran 0–2, M Leech 0–2, L Leech 0–1.	Referee: P Kelly (Dublin)

Semi-finals

27 June 1971 Semi-final	Kildare	4–8 – 2–12	Meath	Croke Park, Dublin
	T Walshe 2–1, E O'Donoghue 1–0, P Archbold 1–0, K Kelly 0–3, P Dunny 0–3, T Carew 0–1.		T Brennan 2–6, M Fay 0–3, N Curran 0–2, K Rennicks 0–1.	Referee: P Kelly (Dublin)

4 July 1971 Semi-final	Laois	0–10 – 2–12	Offaly	O'Moore Park, Portlaoise
	E Condron 0–5, S Lalor 0–2, S Allen 0–1, H Mulhaire 0–1, B Millar 0–1.		T McTague 1–4, S Evans 1–0, S Cooney 0–3, M Connor 0–2, J Gunning 0–2, K Kilmurray 0–1.	Attendance: 23055; Referee: B Hayden (Carlow)

Final

18 July 1971 Final	Offaly	2–14 – 0–6	Kildare	Croke Park, Dublin
	Tony McTague 0–9 (0-5f), Murt Connor 2–1, Kevin Kilmurray 0–4.		Pat Dunny 0-2f, Tommy Carew 0–2, Hugh Hyland 0–1, Kevin Kelly 0-1f.	Attendance: 34,255; Referee: P Kelly (Dublin)

=== Munster Senior Football Championship ===
Quarter-finals

6 June 1971 Quarter-final	Clare	1–9 – 3–2	Limerick	Hennessy Memorial Park, Milltown Malbay
	P Cotter 1–1, M Moloney 0–4, J Hehir 0–3, M Chambers 0–1.		T Madigan 2–1, É Cregan 1–1.	Referee: P Vernon (Tipperary)

6 June 1971 Quarter-final	Tipperary	1–14 – 1–9	Waterford	Ned Hall Park, Clonmel
	P Blythe 0–9, V O'Donnell 1–2, M Keating 0–2, B Strang 0–1.		P Casey 1–3, T Power 0–4, L O'Rourke 0–1, V Kirwan 0–1.	Referee: P Finnegan (Cork)

Semi-finals

13 June 1971 Semi-final	Clare	0–5 – 2–10	Cork	Páirc Uí Seancháin, Doonbeg
	J Hehir 0–4, E O'Neill 0–1.		D Coughlan 1–6, D Hunt 1–2, B O'Neill 0–1, J Barrett 0–1.	Referee: J Moloney (Tipperary)

13 June 1971 Semi-final	Kerry	1–14 – 1–7	Tipperary	Fitzgerald Stadium, Killarney
	M O'Dwyer 1–6, B Lynch 0–4, M Gleeson 0–1, P Griffin 0–1, J O'Keeffe 0–1, DJ Crowley 0–1.		M Keating 1–1, P Blythe 0–4, D Burke 0–1, P O'Connor 0–1.	Referee: N Dalton (Waterford)

Final

18 July 1971 Final	Cork	0–25 – 0–14	Kerry	Cork Athletic Grounds, Cork
	D Coughlan 0–10, R Cummins 0–6, J Barrett 0–3, KJ O'Sullivan 0–2, D Hunt 0–2, E Kirby 0–1, T O'Brien 0–1.		M O'Dwyer 0–7, M Gleeson 0–2, M O'Connell 0–2, B Lynch 0–2, E O'Donoghue 0–1.	Attendance: 28,347; Referee: S O'Connor (Limerick)

=== Ulster Senior Football Championship ===
Preliminary round

6 June 1971 Preliminary round	Derry	4–10 – 1–10	Fermanagh	Dean McGlinchey Park, Ballinascreen
	M Niblock 2–2, A McGuirk 1–1, E Devlin 1–0, S O'Connor 0–3, J O'Leary 0–1, A McGuckin 0–1, L Diamond 0–1, G O'Loughlin 0–1.		V Greene 1–1, P McGinnity 0–4, G Gallagher 0–2, A Hennerson 0–1, E McPartland 0–1, S McGrath 0–1.	Referee: F Greene (Antrim)

Quarter-finals

6 June 1971 Quarter-final	Armagh	4–9 – 2–10	Tyrone	The Playing Fields, Lurgan
	L McCabe 2–0, J Smith 1–2, J O'Loan 1–0, B Hanna 0–3, G O'Reilly 0–2, P Loughran 0–1, L Kerins 0–1.		P Barrett 1–7, A Mcahon 1–1, S Donaghy 0–1, J McCreesh 0–1.	Referee: B Treanor (Down)

13 June 1971 Quarter-final	Antrim	0–4 – 0–8	Derry	Casement Park, Belfast
	A McCallin 0–2, E Close 0–1, A Hamill 0–1.		S O'Connell 0–5, J O'Leary 0–1, A McGuirk 0–1, M Niblock 0–1.	Referee: P Devlin (Tyrone)

13 June 1971 Quarter-final	Monaghan	1–12 – 2–10	Cavan	Pearse Park, Ballybay
	D McCabe 0–9, G Finnegan 1–0, P Donnelly 0–1, J Leahy 0–1, S Woods 0–1.		G Cosack 0–5, P Murray 1–0, H Newman 1–0, H McInerney 0–3, S Duggan 0–2.	Referee: P Kelly (Down)

20 June 1971 Quarter-final	Down	3-14– 3–6	Donegal	Páirc Esler, Newry
	S O'Neill 2–1, M Cunningham 1–2, J Morgan 0–3, M Cole 0–3, C McAlarney 0–2, C Ward 0–2, P Rooney 0–1.		P McShen 1–1, S Garnnaghan 1–1, T Quinn 1–0, J Hannigan 0–3, M Carney 0–1.	Referee: F Tierney (Cavan)

Semi-finals

4 July 1971 Semi-final	Derry	3–12 – 1–10	Armagh	Casement Park, Belfast
	S O'Connell 1–5, S Gribben 1–2, E Coleman 1–0, M Moran 0–3, A McGuirk 0–1, M Niblock 0–1.		L McCabe 1–2, P Moriarty 0–5, J Smith 0–2, P Loughran 0–1.	Referee: F Greene (Antrim)

11 July 1971 Semi-final	Down	0–11 – 2–3	Cavan	St. Mary's Park, Castleblayney
	P Doherty 0–3, J Morgan 0–2, S O'Neill 0–2, C McAlareny 0–1, J Murphy 0–1, D Gordon 0–1, T O'Hare 0–1.		G Cosack 1–3, S McGuigan 1–0.	Referee: T Johnson (Fermanagh)

Final

25 July 1971 Final	Down	4–15 – 4–11	Derry	Casement Park, Belfast
	M Cunningham 2–0, J Morgan 0–6, D Davey 1–2, J Murphy 1–1, C McAlarney 0–2, S O'Neill 0–2, T O'Hare 0–1, D Gordon 0–1.		M Niblock 2–4, A McGuirk 1–2, S O'Connor 0–5, E Coleman 1–0.	Referee: P Devlin (Tyrone)

=== All-Ireland Senior Football Championship ===
Semi-finals

8 August 1971 Semi-final	Galway	3–11 – 2–7	Down	Croke Park, Dublin
	S Leydon 0–5, P Burke 1–1, E Farrell 1–1, J Duggan 1–0, L Sammon 0–2, J McLoughlin 0–1, W Joyce 0–1.		J Morgan 0–5, D McCartan 1–0, J Fitzsimons 1–0, D Davey 0–1, M Cunningham 0–1.	Attendance: 36,052; Referee: B Hayden (Carlow)

22 August 1971 Semi-final	Offaly	1–16 – 1–11	Cork	Croke Park, Dublin
	T McTague 0–9, K Kilmurray 1–0, J Cooney 0–3, M Connor 0–1, P Fenning 0–1, W Bryan 0–1, K Claffey 0–1.		J Barrett 1–2, D Coughlan 0–4, R Cummins 0–2, D Hunt 0–1, D Long 0–1, KJ O'Sullivan 0–1.	Attendance: 38,000; Referee: L Maguire (Monaghan)

Final

26 September 1971 Final	Offaly	1–14 – 2–8	Galway	Croke Park, Dublin
	T McTague 0–6, M Connor 1–2, S Evans 0–2, K Kilmurray 0–2, B Clavin 0–1, J Cooney 0–1.		S Leydon 2–3, F Canavan 0–3, L Smamon 0–2.	Attendance: 70,798; Referee: P Kelly (Dublin)

== Championship statistics ==
=== Miscellaneous ===
- On 13 June 1971, the Ulster quarter final meeting of Cavan and Monaghan was the first game to be played at Pearse Park, Ballybay in 45 years.
- Belfast hosted the Ulster final last time until 2004 not played at Clones.
- There were a number of first-time championship meetings;
- The All Ireland semi-final between Offaly and Cork was the first ever championship meeting between the two teams.
- The All-Ireland final between Offaly and Galway was the first to be broadcast in colour by Telefís Éireann. It was also the first ever championship meeting between the two teams.
- By claiming their first championship, Offaly become the 15th team to win the All-Ireland title who the last before Donegal in 1992 to do so.

=== Top scorers ===
Overall

Rank	Player	County	Tally	Total	Matches	Average
1	Tony McTague	Offaly	1–35	38	5	7.60
2	Seamus Leydon	Galway	4–19	31	5	6.20
3	Mickey Kearns	Sligo	0–27	27	3	9.00
4	Denis Coughlan	Cork	1–20	23	3	7.66
5	Mickey Niblock	Derry	4–8	20	4	5.00
6	Enda Condron	Laois	1–16	19	4	4.75
7	Mick O'Dwyer	Kerry	1–13	16	2	8.00
7	James Morgan	Down	0–16	16	4	4.00
9	Murt Connor	Offaly	3–6	15	5	3.00
10	Tony Brennan	Meath	2–8	14	2	7.00

Single game

Rank	Player	County	Tally	Total	Opposition
1	Mickey Kearns	Sligo	0–13	13	Galway
2	Tony Brennan	Meath	2–6	12	Kildare
3	Mickey Niblock	Derry	2–4	10	Down
3	Patsy Barrett	Tyrone	1–7	10	Armagh
3	Enda Condron	Laois	1–7	10	Carlow
3	Seamus Leydon	Galway	1–7	10	Sligo
3	Denis Coughlan	Cork	0–10	10	Kerry
8	Seamus Leydon	Galway	2–3	9	Offaly
8	Denis Coughlan	Cork	1–6	9	Clare
8	Mick O'Dwyer	Kerry	1–6	9	Tipperary
8	Tony McTague	Offaly	0–9	9	Kildare
8	Paudie Blythe	Tipperary	0–9	9	Waterford
8	Declan McCabe	Monaghan	0–9	9	Cavan
8	Tony McTague	Offaly	0–9	9	Cork
