= 1983 All-Ireland Senior Football Championship =

Football championship

Championship details
- Dates: 15 May – 18 September 1983
- Teams: 32

All-Ireland Champions
- Winning team: Dublin (21st win)
- Captain: Tommy Drumm
- Manager: Kevin Heffernan

All-Ireland Finalists
- Losing team: Galway
- Captain: Séamus McHugh
- Manager: Mattie McDonagh

Provincial Champions
- Munster: Cork
- Leinster: Dublin
- Ulster: Donegal
- Connacht: Galway

Championship statistics
- No. matches played: 34
- Top Scorer: Barney Rock (6–27)
- Player of the Year: Tommy Drumm

The 1983 All-Ireland Senior Football Championship was the 97th staging of the All-Ireland Senior Football Championship, the Gaelic Athletic Association's premier inter-county Gaelic football tournament. The championship began on 15 May 1983 and ended on 18 September 1983.

Offaly entered the championship as the defending champions, however, they were defeated by Dublin in the Leinster final.

On 18 September 1983, Dublin won the championship following a 1–10 to 1–8 defeat of Galway in the All-Ireland final. This was their 21st All-Ireland title and their first in six championship seasons.

Dublin's Barney Rock was the championship's top scorer with 6–27. Dublin's Tommy Drumm was the choice for Texaco Footballer of the Year.

== Results ==
=== Connacht Senior Football Championship ===
Quarter-finals

5 June 1983 Quarter-final	London	0–7 – 2–8	Sligo	Emerald GAA Grounds, Ruislip
	J McParland 0–2, B Grealish 0–2, T O'Donoghue 0–1, D Charles 0–1, R O'Dwyer 0–1.		T Carty 2–0, A Brennan 0–3, J Kearins 0–3, John Kent 0–1, C Murphy 0–1.	Referee: J Mullaney (Roscommon)

12 June 1983 Quarter-final	Mayo	0–9 – 0–7	Roscommon	McHale Park, Castlebar
	M Carney 0–3, TJ Kilgallon 0–2, WJ Padden 0–2, B Kilkenny 0–1, P Dixon 0–1.		D Earley 0–4, A Dooley 0–2, GK Connellan 0–1.	Referee: T Moran (Leitrim)

Semi-finals

26 June 1983 Semi-final	Leitrim	1–6 – 1–8	Galway	Páirc Sheáin Mhic Dhiarmada, Carrick-on-Shannon
	P Prendergast 0–4, S Mulhern 1–0, J Ward 0–1, P Kelly 0–1.		B Brennan 0–4, M Brennan 1–0, B O'Donnell 0–2, S Joyce 0–1, T Tierney 0–1.

3 July 1983 Semi-final	Sligo	0–9 – 0–13	Mayo	Markievicz Park, Sligo
	J Kearins 0–3, A Brennan 0–2, J Kent 0–1, M McCarrick 0–1, P Henry 0–1, R Henneberry 0–1.		M Carney 0–5, R Bell 0–2, TJ Kilgallon 0–2, P Dixon 0–2, J Lyons 0–1, P Duffy 0–1.	Referee: S Mullaney (Roscommon)

Final

17 July 1983 Final	Mayo	1–10 – 1–13	Galway	McHale Park, Castlebar
	M Carney 1–0, K McStay 0–2, G Geraghty 0–2, P Dixon 0–2, R Bell 0–1, P Brogan 0–1, J Lyons 0–1, WJ Padden 0–1.		S Joyce 1–2, B O'Donnell 0–3, G McManus 0–3, V Daly 0–3, T Conneely 0–1, WJ Padden 0–1.	Attendance: 18,000; Referee: S Mullaney (Roscommon)

=== Leinster Senior Football Championship ===
First round

15 May 1983 First round	Longford	3–15 – 0–13	Carlow	O'Connor Park, Tullamore
	J McCormack 1–7, M Casey 1–3, E McCormack 1–2, K O'Rourke 0–2, L Tierney 0–1.		W Cullen 0–3, J Owens 0–2, P Carey 0–2, P Quirke 0–2, J Walsh 0–2, T Dwyer 0–1, N Molloy 0–1.	Attendance: 1,500; Referee: J Gunning (Offaly)

15 May 1983 First round	Louth	2–11 – 2–5	Westmeath	Croke Park, Dublin
	Jim McDonnell 1–7, D Kelleher 1–2, R Culhane 0–2.		R Fahy 1–3, T McCormack 1–0, W Lowry 0–2.	Attendance: 3,186; Referee: A Jordan (Dublin)

22 May 1983 First round	Wicklow	0–11 – 0–11	Wexford	Dr. Cullen Park, Carlow
	P Baker 0–8, K Ryan 0–1.		E Mahon 0–6, G O'Connor 0–4, E Kehoe 0–1.	Referee: C Lally (Laois)

5 June 1983 First round replay	Wexford	4–20 – 2–14 (aet)	Wicklow	Croke Park, Dublin
	M Hanrick 1–4, E Mahon 0–7, M Fitzhenry 1–3, S Fitzhenry 1–2, P Walsh 1–0, E Kehoe 0–2, T Foran 0–1, N Swords 0–1.		P Baker 0–7, K Baker 1–2, T Foley 1–0, P O'Toole 0–2, T Murphy 0–1, P Byrne 0–1, J Lynch 0–1.	Referee: C Lally (Laois)

Quarter-final

5 June 1983 Quarter-final	Kildare	3–9 – 2–9	Longford	O'Connor Park, Tullamore
	L Tompkins 2–3, J Ryan 1–1, P Farrell 0–4, S Fahy 0–1.		J McCormack 1–4, K O'Rourke 1–2, D Barry 0–2, L Tierney 0–1.	Referee: P Kavanagh (Meath)

5 June 1983 Quarter-final	Louth	3–11 – 0–8	Laois	Croke Park, Dublin
	Jim McDonnell 1–4, P Reneghan 1–1, B Gaughran 1–0, John McDonnell 0–3, E Judge 0–1, R Culhane 0–1, A Wiseman 0–1.		B Clancy 0–2, E Whelan 0–1, P Roe 0–1, J Ramsbottom 0–1, L Scully 0–1, J Lawlor 0–1, J Irwin 0–1.	Referee: D Guerin (Dublin)

12 June 1983 Quarter-final	Dublin	2–8 – 2–8	Meath	Croke Park, Dublin
	B Rock 1–2, A O'Toole 0–2, K Duff 0–2, J Kearns 0–2.		C O'Rourke 1–4, B Tansey 1–0, P Smith 1–0 og, F Murtagh 0–2, E Barry 0–1, M Downes 0–1.	Referee: J Gunning (Offaly)

12 June 1983 Quarter-final	Offaly	2–18 – 1–8	Wexford	Croke Park, Dublin
	M Connor 1–4, G Carroll 1–2, D Farrell 0–5, J Guinan 0–2, A O'Halloran 0–2, Séamus Darby 0–2, P Dunne 0–1.		G O'Connor 0–6, S Fitzhenry 1–0, M Hanrick 0–1, N Swords 0–1.	Attendance: 25,069; Referee: K Campbell (Meath)

3 July 1983 Quarter-final replay	Dublin	3–9 – 0–16 (aet)	Meath	Croke Park, Dublin
	B Rock 2–3, B Jordan 1–0, K Duff 0–3, P Canavan 0–1, J Kearns 0–1, A O'Toole 0–1.		F Murtagh 0–8, C O'Rourke 0–4, L Smith 0–1, E Barry 0–1, M Downes 0–1, JJ McCormack 0–1.	Referee: J Gunning (Offaly)

Semi-finals

26 June 1983 Semi-final	Offaly	2–15 – 0–6	Kildare	Páirc Tailteann, Navan
	M Connor 1–8, B Lowry 1–0, D Farrell 0–2, J Guinan 0–2, A O'Halloran 0–1, R Connor 0–1, T O'Connor 0–1.		L Tompkins 0–2, S Fahy 0–2, P Farrell 0–1, J Ryan 0–1.	Referee: P Collins (Westmeath)

17 July 1983 Semi-final	Dublin	1–12 – 0–3	Louth	Croke Park, Dublin
	B Rock 0–4, K Duff 1–0, A O'Toole 0–3, C Redmond 0–2, A McCaul 0–2, B Jordan 0–1.		D Callaghan 0–2, Johnny McDonnell 0–1.	Referee: T Collins (Meath)

Final

31 July 1983 Final	Dublin	2–13 – 1–11	Offaly	Croke Park, Dublin
	Joe McNally 1–2, Barney Rock 0-5f, John Caffrey 1–0, Tommy Conroy and Kieran Duff 0–2 each, Anton O'Toole and John Kearns 0–1 each		Matt Connor 1–7 (0-6f), Brendan Lowry 0–2, Tomas O'Connor and Martin Fitzpatrick 0–1 each	Attendance: 36,912; Referee: P Collins (Westmeath)

=== Munster Senior Football Championship ===
Quarter-finals

29 May 1983 Quarter-final	Limerick	1–9 – 2–16	Tipperary	Gaelic Grounds, Limerick
	T Cummins 1–3, A Moran 0–3, T Browne 0–2, F Ryan 0–1.		M Beston 1–3, F Kelly 0–6, L Conroy 1–2, B Conway 0–2, J Dunne 0–1, T Carr 0–1, M O'Riordan 0–1.	Referee: W Fogarty (Kerry)

12 June 1983 Quarter-final	Clare	4–16 – 0–5	Waterford	Cusack Park, Ennis
	F Mescall 3–0, P McNamara 0–7, S Moloney 0–5, D O'Loughlin 1–0, G Fitzpatrick 0–1, N Normoyle 0–1, G Curtin 0–1, T Bonsis 0–1.		M Reid 0–2, P Keating 0–1, J Hartery 0–1, M Hogan 0–1.	Referee: W Fogarty (Kerry)

Semi-finals

26 June 1983 Semi-final	Tipperary	2–5 – 5–16	Kerry	Ned Hall Park, Clonmel
	B Conway 1–2, I Conroy 1–0, O Maher 0–1, G McGrath 0–1, F Kelly 0–1.		M Sheehy 2–4, J O'Shea 2–1, S Walsh 1–1, D Moran 0–4, T Doyle 0–2, G Power 0–2, J Egan 0–2.	Referee: J Dennigan (Cork)

3 July 1983 Semi-final	Clare	1–5 – 1–11	Cork	Cusack Park, Ennis
	G Fitzpatrick 1–1, P McNamara 0–2, F Mescall 0–1, N Roche 0–1.		J Cleary 0–8, T Murphy 1–2, D Barry 0–1.	Referee: W Fogarty (Kerry)

Final

17 July 1983 Final	Cork	3–10 – 3–9	Kerry	Páirc Uí Chaoimh, Cork
	T Murphy 2–2, J Cleary 1–6, D Allen 0–2,		M Sheehy 0–7, J O'Shea 2–0, S Walsh 1–0, J Egan 0–1, G Power 0–1.	Attendance: 17,000; Referee: J Moloney (Tipperary)

=== Ulster Senior Football Championship ===
Preliminary round

22 May 1983 Preliminary round	Derry	0–11 – 1–12	Cavan	Dean McGlinchey Park, Ballinascreen
	J Irwin 0–4, K Quinn 0–3, K McWilliams 0–2, M Lynch 0–1, B O'Neill 0–1.		D McDonnell 1–4, R Cullivan 0–3, D Donohoe 0–2, M Lynch 0–2, B O'Grady 0–1.	Referee: J Gough (Antrim)

Quarter-finals

29 May 1983 Quarter-final	Fermanagh	0–10 – 0–8	Down	St. Molaise Park, Irvinestown
	P McGinnitty 0–3, P Connolly 0–2, K Corrigan 0–2, K McElroy 0–1, A McCaffrey 0–1, D Corrigan 0–1.		G Blaney 0–3, B McGOvern 0–2, D Bell 0–1, P Browne 0–1, L Austin 0–1.	Referee: S Gallagher (Donegal)

5 June 1983 Quarter-final	Monaghan	2–18 – 0–4	Antrim	St. Mary's Park, Castleblayney
	E Hughes 1–3, E McEneaney 1–3, R McCarron 0–4, R McDermott 0–2, Séamus Carville 0–2, M Caulfield 0–2, D Mulligan 0–1, H Clerkin 0–1.		D Armstrong 0–3, D Graham 0–1.	Referee: J Heaney (Tyrone)

13 June 1983 Quarter-final	Donegal	1–10 – 0–7	Armagh	MacCumhaill Park, Ballybofey
	M McHugh 0–5, C Mulgrew 1–1, J McMullen 0–1, M Carr 0–1, M Lafferty 0–1, C Keaney 0–1.		J Horgan 0–6, C McGuirk 0–1.	Referee: J McCorry (Cavan)

19 June 1983 Quarter-final	Cavan	0–11 – 0–10	Tyrone	Breffni Park, Cavan
	M Lynch 0–7, D Donohoe 0–1, P McNamee 0–1, D McDonnell 0–1, J Reilly 0–1.		F McGuigan 0–4, S Daly 0–2, P Hannigan 0–1, S Donnelly 0–1, E Bradley 0–1, E McKenna 0–1.	Referee: S Murray (Monaghan)

Semi-finals

26 June 1983 Semi-final	Donegal	1–14 – 1–9	Monaghan	St. Molaise Park, Irvinestown
	J McMullen 1–3, P McGettigan 0–3, D Reid 0–2, S Bonnar 0–2, C Mulgrew 0–1, K Keaney 0–1, T McDermott 0–1, A Molloy 0–1.		R McCarron 0–4, H Clerkin 1–0, E McEneaney 0–2, R McDermott 0–1, N McKenna 0–1, M Caulfield 0–1.	Attendance: 12,000; Referee: J McCorry (Cavan)

3 July 1983 Semi-final	Cavan	2–12 – 1–7	Fermanagh	St. Tiernach's Park, Clones
	D McDonnell 2–5, M Lynch 0–5, D Donohoe 0–2.		D Corrigan 1–0, G McElroy 0–3, P McGinnity 0–2, K Corrigan 0–1, P Connolly 0–1.	Referee: S Murray (Monaghan)

Final

24 July 1983 Final	Donegal	1–14 – 1–11	Cavan	St. Tiernach's Park, Clones
	M McHugh 0–7, S Bonnar 1–1, J McMullan 0–3, D Reid 0–2, M Carr 0–1.		D McDonnell 1–2, M Lynch 0–4, S King 0–1, J Reilly 0–1, D Donohue 0–1, M Faulkner 0–1, R Cullivan 0–1.	Attendance: 25,000; Referee: J Gough (Antrim)

=== All-Ireland Senior Football Championship ===
Semi-finals

14 August 1983 Semi-final	Galway	1–12 – 1–11	Donegal	Croke Park, Dublin
	V Daly 1–1, S Joyce 0–4, H O'Donnell 0–2, G McManus 0–2, T Tierney 0–1, P Lee 0–1, R Lee 0–1.		K Keeney 1–0, M McHugh 0–5, S Bonnar 0–2, M Corr 0–1, D Reid 0–1, T McDermott 0–1, J McMullen 0–1.	Referee: W Fogarty (Kerry)

21 August 1983 Semi-final	Dublin	2–11 – 2–11	Cork	Croke Park, Dublin
	B Rock 1–3, A O'Toole 1–1, K Duff 0–2, T Conroy 0–2, J McNulty 0–2, PJ Buckley 0–1.		D Allen 2–1, J Cleary 0–3, J Allen 0–3, C Ryan 0–1, T Murphy 0–1, D Barry 0–1, D Creedon 0–1.	Attendance: 49,773; Referee: PJ McGrath (Mayo)

28 August 1983 Semi-final replay	Cork	2–10 – 4–15	Dublin	Páirc Uí Chaoimh, Cork
	D Barry 2–1, J Cleary 0–7, T Murphy 0–1, J Kerrigan 0–1.		B Rock 1–4, K Duff 1–3, J McNally 1–3, B Mullins 1–0, T Conroy 0–2, A O'Toole 0–1, J Ronayne 0–1, J Caffrey 0–1.	Attendance: 43,433; Referee: PJ McGrath (Mayo)

Final

18 September 1983 Final	Dublin	1–10 – 1–8	Galway	Croke Park, Dublin
	B Rock 1–6, J Ronayne 0–1, PJ Buckley 0–1, J McNally 0–1, K Duff 0–1.		S Joyce 1–1, B Brennan 0–3, M Coleman 0–1, S McHugh 0–1, G McManus 0–1, M Brennan 0–1.	Attendance: 71,988; Referee: J Gough (Antrim)

== Championship statistics ==
=== Scoring ===
Overall

Rank	Player	County	Tally	Total	Matches	Average
1	Barney Rock	Dublin	6–27	45	7	6.42
2	Matt Connor	Offaly	3–19	28	3	7.33
3	John Cleary	Cork	1–24	27	4	6.75
4	Derek McDonnell	Cavan	4–12	24	4	6.00
5	Kieran Duff	Dublin	2–13	19	7	2.71
6	Mikey Sheehy	Kerry	2–11	17	2	8.50
6	John McCormack	Longford	2–11	17	2	8.50
6	Mikey Sheehy	Kerry	2–11	17	2	8.50
6	Jim McDonnell	Louth	2–11	17	3	5.66
10	Tadhg Murphy	Cork	3–6	15	4	3.75

Top scorers in a single game

Rank	Player	Team	Tally	Total	Opposition
1	Derek McDonnell	Cavan	2–5	11	Fermamagh
1	Matt Connor	Offaly	1–8	11	Kildare
3	Mikey Sheehy	Kerry	2–4	10	Tipperary
3	John McCormack	Longford	1–7	10	Carlow
3	Jim McDonnell	Louth	1–7	10	Westmeath
3	Matt Connor	Offaly	1–7	10	Dublin
7	Frank Mescall	Clare	3–0	9	Waterford
7	Larry Tompkins	Kildare	2–3	9	Longford
7	Barney Rock	Dublin	2–3	9	Meath
7	John Cleary	Cork	1–6	9	Kerry
7	Barney Rock	Dublin	1–6	9	Galway

=== Miscellaneous ===
- After losing eight consecutive Munster finals, Cork finally defeated Kerry by 3–10 to 3–9 to take the provincial title for the first time since 1974.
- The Dublin vs Cork All Ireland semi-final replay was played at Pairc Ui Chaoimh, Cork was the last to be outside Croke Park, Dublin until 2014. It was also the first All-Ireland semi-final replay to be played outside Croke Park since 1941.
- The All-Ireland final has gone down as the most ill-disciplined decider in championship history. Dubbed the Game of Shame, four players were sent off – three from the Dublin team and one from Galway. Although the official attendance was 71,988 there was overcrowding on both terraces with many supporters failing to get into the ground. Same scoreline as 1942 All Ireland final 41 years later.
