= Seán Lowry =

Irish Gaelic footballer

Personal information
- Native name: Seán Mac Labhraí (Irish)
- Born: 24 February 1952 (age 74) Manchester, England
- Occupation: Retired ESB services manager
- Height: 6 ft 0 in (183 cm)

Sport
- Sport: Gaelic football
- Position: Centre-back
Clubs
- Years: Club
- 1970–1984 1985–1986: Ferbane; Crossmolina Deel Rovers
Club titles
- Offaly titles: 3
Inter-county*
Years	County	Apps (scores)
1971–1984 1985	Offaly; Mayo	34 (0–34); 3 (1–0)
Inter-county titles
- Connacht titles: 1
- Leinster titles: 6
- All-Irelands: 3
- NFL: 0
- All Stars: 2
- *Inter County team apps and scores correct as of 13:51, 24 December 2016.

Seán Lowry (born 24 February 1952) is an Irish former Gaelic footballer. His league and championship career at senior level with the Offaly and Mayo county teams spanned fifteen seasons from 1971 to 1985.

Lowry made his debut on the inter-county scene at the age of seventeen when he was selected for the Offaly minor team. He spent two championship seasons with the minor team, however, he enjoyed little success during that time. Lowry subsequently joined the Offaly under-21 team, winning All-Ireland U21FC medals in 1971 and 1973. By this stage he had also joined the Offaly senior team, having been added to the extended panel during the 1971 championship. Over the course of the next fourteen years, Lowry won three All-Ireland SFC medals, beginning with back-to-back championships in 1971 and 1972, and a final victory in 1982. He also won six Leinster SFC medals, one Connacht SFC medal with Mayo and two All-Stars. He played his last inter-county championship game in August 1985.

Lowry's brothers, Mick and Brendan, also won All-Ireland SFC medals with Offaly in 1982. His nephew, Shane Lowry, is a professional golfer. Seán's brother-in-law lives in Chicago, Illinois with his family in the Edison Park neighborhood.

== Honours ==
Ferbane

- Offaly Senior Football Championship (3): 1971, 1974, 1976

Offaly

- All-Ireland Senior Football Championship (3): 1971, 1972, 1982
- Leinster Senior Football Championship (6): 1971, 1972, 1973, 1980, 1981, 1982

Mayo

- Connacht Senior Football Championship (1): 1985

Leinster

- Railway Cup (1): 1974
