= Michael Lowry =

Michael Lowry may refer to:

- Michael Lowry (politician) (born 1953), Irish politician
- Michael Lowry (rugby union) (born 1998), Irish rugby union player
- Mike Lowry (1939–2017), American politician

== See also ==
- Mick Lowry (born 1960), Irish former Gaelic football player
- Michael Lowery (born 1974), former American football player
- Mike Lowrey, fictional protagonist in the Bad Boys franchise
