= Tomás O'Connor (Gaelic footballer) =

Offaly Gaelic footballer

Tomás O' Connor
Personal information
- Native name: Tomás Ó Conchubhair (Irish)
- Born: 13 May 1958 (age 68) Walsh Island, County Offaly
- Occupation: Clerical officer
- Height: 6 ft 3 in (191 cm)

Sport
- Sport: Gaelic football
- Position: Midfield
Club
- Years: Club
- 1970s–1990s: Walsh Island
Inter-county
Years	County	Apps (scores)
1978–1986	Offaly	26
Inter-county titles
- Leinster titles: 3
- All-Irelands: 1
- NFL: 0
- All Stars: 1

Tomás O'Connor (born 13 May 1955 in Walsh Island, County Offaly) is an Irish former sportsman. He played Gaelic football with his local club Walsh Island and was a member of the Offaly senior county team from 1978 until 1986.
