= 1982 All-Ireland Senior Football Championship =

Football championship

Championship details
- Dates: 9 May – 19 September 1982
- Teams: 33

All-Ireland Champions
- Winning team: Offaly (3rd win)
- Captain: Richie Connor
- Manager: Eugene McGee

All-Ireland Finalists
- Losing team: Kerry
- Captain: John Egan
- Manager: Mick O'Dwyer

Provincial Champions
- Munster: Kerry
- Leinster: Offaly
- Ulster: Armagh
- Connacht: Galway

Championship statistics
- No. matches played: 34
- Top Scorer: Matt Connor (0–34)
- Player of the Year: Martin Furlong

The 1982 All-Ireland Senior Football Championship was the 96th staging of the All-Ireland Senior Football Championship, the Gaelic Athletic Association's premier inter-county Gaelic football tournament. The championship began on 9 May 1982 and ended on 19 September 1982.

It was the last year to date that a Kilkenny team played in the Leinster championship.

Kerry were the defending champions and were hoping to win a record-breaking fifth successive championship title.

Kerry qualified for the final. On 19 September 1982, Offaly won the championship following a 1–15 to 0–17 defeat of Kerry in one of the most dramatic and iconic All-Ireland finals in the history of the championship. This was their third All-Ireland title, their first in ten championship seasons. It remains their last All-Ireland SFC victory.

Offaly's Matt Connor was the championship's top scorer with 0–34. Offaly's Martin Furlong was the choice for Texaco Footballer of the Year.

== Results ==
=== Connacht Senior Football Championship ===
Quarter-finals

23 May 1982 Quarter-final	London	0–5 – 1–13	Leitrim	Emerald GAA Grounds, Ruislip
				Referee: S. McManamon (Galway)

6 June 1982 Quarter-final	Roscommon	3–8 – 0–13	Sligo	Dr. Hyde Park, Roscommon
	M Finneran 2–2, D Earley 0–4, P McNeill 1–0, T McManus 0–2.		M Hoey 0–4, J Kearins 0–3, R Hennerberry 0–2, J Kent 0–2, F McHale 0–1, M McCarrick 0–1.	Referee: PJ McGrath (Mayo)

Semi-finals

13 June 1982 Semi-final	Leitrim	1–7 – 2–7	Mayo	Páirc Seán Mac Diarmada, Carrick-on-Shannon
	M Quinn 1–2, E Duignan 0–3, F Holohan 0–1, M Martin 0–1.		J Lyons 1–0, T Reilly 1–0, T O'Malley 0–3, J McGrath 0–1, D McGrath 0–1, H Gavin 0–1, WJ Padden 0–1.	Referee: S Mulleney (Roscommon)

20 June 1982 Semi-final	Roscommon	0–9 – 1–9	Galway	Dr. Hyde Park, Roscommon
	D Earley 0–5, M Finneran 0–3, J O'Connor 0–1.		G McManus 0–6, S Joyce 1–0, P O'Neill 0–1, V Daly 0–1, R Lee 0–1.	Attendance: 12,832; Referee: P Gorman (Sligo)

Final

11 July 1982 Final	Galway	3–17 – 0–10	Mayo	Tuam Stadium, Tuam
	R Lee 2–0, B Brennan 0–6, G McManus 0–5, S Joyce 1–1, V Daly 0–3, P Conroy 0–1, B Talty 0–1.		M Carney 0–6, J Bourke 0–2, WJ Padden 0–1, TJ Kilgallon 0–1.	Attendance: 18,000; Referee: P Gorman (Sligo)

=== Leinster Senior Football Championship ===
Preliminary round

9 May 1982 Preliminary round	Kildare	4–10 – 1–2	Kilkenny	Nowlan Park, Kilkenny
	G Power 2–4, T Shaw 1–2, N Byrne 1–1, P Kelly 0–1, C Moran 0–1, S Fahy 0–1.		M Fitzgerald 1–0, D Hoyne 0–2.	Referee: PJ Kelly (Carlow)

16 May 1982 Preliminary round	Louth	2–13 – 0–8	Carlow	Croke Park, Dublin
	K Dawe 1–2, P O'Hare 0–5, D Kelleher 1–1, J McDonnell 0–2, M Carr 0–1, J McDonnell 0–1, M McDermott 0–1.		W CUllen 0–4, J Walsh 0–2, J Owens 0–1.	Referee: D Guerin (Dublin)

16 May 1982 Preliminary round	Meath	0–11 – 0–12	Longford	O'Connor Park, Tullamore
	M Downes 0–5, C O'Rourke 0–2, K Rennicks 0–1, E Barry 0–1, L Hayes 0–1, F O'Sullivan 0–1.		J McCormack 0–6, G Crowe 0–3, L Tierney 0–2, P Masterson 0–1.	Referee: J Gunning (Offaly)

23 May 1982 Preliminary round	Westmeath	1–8 – 0–11	Wicklow	St. Conleth's Park, Newbridge
	F Tone 0–5, C Flanagan 1–0, M Behan 0–2, S Conroy 0–1.		P Baker 0–2, P Byrne 0–2, C Murphy 0–2, T Murphy 0–2, O Doyle 0–1, P O'Byrne 0–1, M Coffey 0–1.	Referee: P Kavanagh (Meath)

6 June 1982 Preliminary round replay	Westmeath	3–7 – 2–5	Wicklow	Croke Park, Dublin
	S Conroy 1–2, M Clarke 1–1, B Coughlan 1–0, W Lowry 0–2, F Tone 0–1, M Behan 0–1.		P Baker 1–3, P Byrne 1–1, T Murphy 0–1.	Referee: P Kavanagh (Meath)

Quarter-finals

6 June 1982 Quarter-final	Dublin	1–15 – 2–6	Longford	O'Connor Park, Tullamore
	B Rock 1–9, N Gaffney 0–2, K Duff 0–1, P Canavan 0–1, J Kearns 0–1, G O'Neill 0–1.		J McCormack 1–4, G Crowe 1–0, P Kiernan 0–1, P Mullooly 0–1.	Referee: J Gunning (Offaly)

6 June 1982 Quarter-final	Kildare	1–17 – 1–9	Wexford	Croke Park, Dublin
	L Tompkins 0–8, T Shaw 1–2, S Fahy 0–2, N Byrne 0–2, G Power 0–1, J Giblin 0–1.		G Howlin 1–0, E Mahon 0–3, S Fitzhenry 0–2, M Carty 0–2, M Hendrick 0–1, G O'Connor 0–1.	Referee: K Campbell (Meath)

13 June 1982 Quarter-final	Offaly	0–17 – 0–8	Louth	Croke Park, Dublin
	M Connor 0–8, B Lowry 0–3, O Minnock 0–2, G Carroll 0–2, P Dunne 0–1, P Healy 0–1.		JP O'Kane 0–3, P O'Hare 0–2, B Gaughren 0–1, Jimmy McDonnell 0–1, E Judge 0–1.	Attendance: 8,212; Referee: C Lally (Laois)

13 June 1982 Quarter-final	Laois	2–9 – 1–7	Westmeath	Croke Park, Dublin
	J Ramsbottom 1–2, B Miller 1–2, M Moore 0–3, Whelan 0–1, G Browne 0–1.		W Lowry 1–1, E Coughlan 0–2, M Fagan 0–2, C Flanagan 0–1, F Tone 0–1.	Referee: T Jordan (Dublin)

Semi-finals

27 June 1982 Semi-final	Offaly	3–13 – 1–15	Laois	O'Connor Park, Tullamore
	M Connor 0–9, B Lowry 1–2, J Guinan 1–1, G Carroll 1–0, S Lowry 0–1.		B Miller 1–3, J Ramsbottom 0–6, T Prendergast 0–2, E Whelan 0–2, C Browne 0–1, M Moore 0–1.	Attendance: 12,000; Referee: P Collins (Westmeath)

4 July 1982 Semi-final	Dublin	1–13 – 0–12	Kildare	Páirc Tailteann, Navan
	B Rock 0–7, C Duff 1–0, N Gaffney 0–2, A McCaul 0–2, A Walsh 0–2.		L Tompkins 0–6, G Power 0–2, S Fahy 0–1, N Byrne 0–1, C Moran 0–1, D Kavanagh 0–1.	Referee: K Campbell (Meath)

Final

1 August 1982 Final	Offaly	1–16 – 1–7	Dublin	Croke Park, Dublin
	Séamus Darby 1–3, Gerry Carroll, John Guinan, Matt Connor (0-1f, 1 '50), Liam O'Mahony 0–3 each, Brendan Lowry 0–1		Niall Gaffney 1–1, Barney Rock 0–2, John Kearns 0–2, Anto McCaul 0–1, Kieran Duff 0–1.	Attendance: 32,504; Referee: Paddy Collins (Westmeath)

=== Munster Senior Football Championship ===
Quarter-finals

9 May 1982 Quarter-final	Tipperary	0–11 – 0–9	Waterford	Ned Hall Park, Clonmel
	G McGrath 0–4, T McGrath 0–3, F Kelly 0–2, B Conway 0–1, S McGrath 0–1.		O O'Brien 0–5, J Butler 0–2, T O'Keeffe 0–1, T Hayes 0–1.	Referee: E Porter (Cork)

16 May 1982 Quarter-final	Clare	4–12 – 0–8	Limerick	Cusack Park, Ennis
	S Moloney 1–5, A Moloney 2–0, M Brew 1–0, G Fitzpatrick 0–3, P McNamara 0–3, D O'Donoghue 0–1.		A McCallin 0–2, G Collins 0–2, P Barrett 0–1, K Hanley 0–1, T Cummins 0–1.	Referee: G O'Sullivan (Kerry)

Semi-finals

6 June 1982 Semi-final	Clare	0–7 – 1–15	Kerry	Cusack Park, Ennis
	P McNamara 0–2, A Moloney 0–2, T Benfil 0–1, N Normoyle 0–1, G Fitzpatrick 0–1.		M Sheehy 0–6, P Spillane 0–4, E Liston 1–0, G Power 0–2, D Moran 0–1, T Doyle 0–1, V O'Connor 0–1.	Attendance: 3,000; Referee: R Moloney (Limerick)

6 June 1982 Semi-final	Cork	1–19 – 1–5	Tipperary	Páirc Mac Gearailt, Fermoy
	T O'Reilly 0–5, D Allen 0–4, E Fitzgerald 0–4, D Barry 0–4, D McCarthy 1–0, T Murphy 0–2.		O Maher 1–2, S McCarthy 0–2, J Conroy 0–1.	Referee: W Fogarty (Kerry)

Finals

4 July 1982 Final	Kerry	0–9 – 0–9	Cork	Páirc Uí Chaoimh, Cork
	Mikey Sheehy 0–5 (0-2f), Sean Walsh 0–3, Eoin Liston 0–1		Michael Burns, Dinny Allen (0-2f), Declan Barron, Diarmuid McCarthy 0–2 each, Tadhg O'Reilly 0-1f	Attendance: 25,320; Referee: Ray Moloney (Limerick)

1 August 1982 Final replay	Kerry	2–18 – 0–12	Cork	Fitzgerald Stadium, Killarney
	Mikey Sheehy 2–4 (0-3f), Ogie Moran, Tom Spillane, Eoin Liston 0–4 each, Jack O'Shea and John Egan 0–1 each		Dinny Allen 0-4f, Ephie Fitzgerald 0–3 (0-1f), Diarmuid McCarthy 0–2, Michael Burns, Tadhg Murphy, Tadhg O'Reilly 0–1 each	Attendance: 34,208; Referee: Ray Moloney (Limerick)

=== Ulster Senior Football Championship ===
Preliminary round

16 May 1982 Preliminary round	Monaghan	0–9 – 1–9	Tyrone	O'Neill Park, Dungannon
	K Finlay 0–5, N McKenna 0–2, D McElligot 0–1, S McAleer 0–1.		E Bradley 1–2, G Taggart 0–3, B Donnelly 0–3, S Daly 0–1.

Quarter-finals

23 May 1982 Quarter-final	Antrim	1–7 – 0–8	Cavan	Breffni Park, Cavan
	A McToal 1–1, A McQuillan 0–4, L Perry 0–1, S McAuley 0–1.		D Donohoe 0–3, P McNamee 0–2, M Faulkner 0–1, B Tierney 0–1, F McDonagh 0–1.	Referee: J Heaney (Tyrone)

30 May 1982 Quarter-final	Donegal	0–13 – 1–11	Armagh	MacCumhaill Park, Ballybofey
	M McHugh 0–8, K Kenney 0–3, M Griffin 0–1, C Mulgrew 0–1.		J Corvan 0–5, M McDonald 1–1, F McMahon 0–2, J Kernan 0–1, D Dowling 0–1, D Hughes 0–1.	Referee: S Murray (Monaghan)

6 June 1982 Quarter-final	Derry	1–8 – 1–9	Fermanagh	St. Molaise Park, Irvinestown
	J Browne 0–4, P Murphy 1–0, J Irwin 0–2, D Barton 0–1, P Dougan 0–1.		A Mulligan 1–2, P McGinnitty 0–2, G McElroy 0–1, A Jones 0–1, P McKenna 0–1, D Corrigan 0–1.

13 June 1982 Quarter-final	Down	0–11 – 1–12	Tyrone	Páirc Esler, Newry
	G Blaney 0–5, B McGovern 0–4, N King 0–1, P Brown 0–1.		T Feddis 0–6, F McGuigan 1–0, B Donnelly 0–2, S Daly 0–1, F Rafferty 0–1, E McKenna 0–1, G Taggart 0–1.	Referee: J Gough (Antrim)

Semi-finals

20 June 1982 Semi-final	Armagh	1–20 – 1–6	Antrim	St. Tiernach's Park, Clones
	K Corvan 1–3, F McMahon 0–6, M McDonald 0–3, S Devlin 0–3, D Dowling 0–2, C McKinstry 0–1, P Rafferty 0–1.		P O'Hare 1–1, A McQuillan 0–3, D Armstrong 0–1, L Perry 0–1.	Referee: J Heaney (Tyrone)

27 June 1982 Semi-final	Fermanagh	1–8 – 0–10	Tyrone	Breffni Park, Cavan
	D Corrigan 1–3, P McGinnitty 0–5.		T Feddis 0–5, F McGuigan 0–2, M Bradley 0–1, K McCabe 0–1, G Taggart 0–1.	Referee: S Murray (Monaghan)

Final

18 July 1982 Final	Armagh	0–10 – 1–4	Fermanagh	St. Tiernach's Park, Clones
	F McMahon 0–3, B Dowling 0–3, J Corvan 0–2, J Kernan 0–1, A Short 0–1.		P McGinnitty 1–2, P McKenna 0–2.	Referee: J McCorry (Cavan)

=== All-Ireland Senior Football Championship ===
Semi-finals

15 August 1982 Semi-final	Armagh	1–11 – 3–15	Kerry	Croke Park, Dublin
	J Kernan 1–3, J Corvan 0–3, F McMahon 0–2, B Hughes 0–1, B McGeown 0–1, N Marley 0–1.		M Sheehy 1–4, E Liston 1–3, J Egan 1–1, T Spillane 0–2, D Moran 0–2, G Power 0–2, S Walsh 0–1.	Attendance: 17,523; Referee: PJ McGrath (Mayo)

22 August 1982 Semi-final	Galway	1–11 – 1–12	Offaly	Croke Park, Dublin
	B Brennan 0–5, T Naughton 1–0, S Joyce 0–2, V Daly 0–1, R Lee 0–1, P O'Neill 0–1, B Talty 0–1.		M Connor 0–7, B Lowry 1–1, J Mooney 0–2, R Connor 0–1, G Carroll 0–1.	Attendance: 25,111; Referee: A Fogarty (Kerry)

Final

19 September 1982 Final	Offaly	1–15 – 0–17	Kerry	Croke Park, Dublin
	M Connor 0–7, Séamus Darby 1–0, B Lowry 0–3, J Mooney 0–2, P Fitzgerald 0–1, S Lowry 0–1, L Currams 0–1.		T Spillane 0–3, M Sheehy 0–3, J Egan 0–3, E Liston 0–2, P Ó Sé 0–2, S Walsh 0–2, P Spillane 0–1, J O'Shea 0–1.	Attendance: 62,309; Referee: PJ McGrath (Mayo)

== Championship statistics ==
=== Scoring ===
Overall

Rank	Player	County	Tally	Total	Matches	Average
1	Matt Connor	Offaly	0–34	34	5	6.80
2	Mikey Sheehy	Kerry	3–22	31	5	6.20
3	Barney Rock	Dublin	1–18	21	3	7
4	Brendan Lowry	Offaly	2–10	16	5	3.20
4	Eoin Liston	Kerry	2–10	16	5	3.66

Top scorers in a single game

Rank	Player	Team	Tally	Total	Opposition
1	Ger Power	Kildare	2–4	10	Kilkenny
1	Mikey Sheehy	Kerry	2–4	10	Cork
3	Matt Connor	Offaly	0–9	9	Laois
4	Mick Finneran	Roscommon	2–2	8	Sligo
4	Seán Moloney	Clare	1–5	8	Limerick
4	Larry Tompkins	Kildare	0–8	8	Wexford
4	Martin McHugh	Donegal	0–8	8	Armagh
4	Matt Connor	Offaly	0–8	8	Louth
9	John McCormack	Longford	1–4	7	Dublin
9	Mikey Sheehy	Kerry	1–4	7	Armagh
9	Matt Connor	Offaly	0–7	7	Kerry
9	Matt Connor	Offaly	0–7	7	Galway
9	Barney Rock	Dublin	0–7	7	Kildare

=== Miscellaneous ===
- Kilkenny's 4–10 to 2–2 defeat by Kildare in the Leinster preliminary round was their last game in the Leinster Championship as the Kilkenny County Board declined to enter a team in all subsequent championships.
- London decide to play Connacht championship games in a rotational system and are dropped from the Connacht championship draws.
- Offaly stop Kerry from winning a fifth All Ireland title in a row in the All Ireland final. A new record of that was set by Dublin winning 6 in a row (2015–2020).

== See also ==
- "Five in a Row", a song
- Players of the Faithful, a documentary
