= Vinny Claffey =

Offaly Gaelic footballer

Personal information
- Born: Doon, County Offaly
- Occupation: Farmer

Sport
- Sport: Gaelic football
- Position: Full Forward
Club
- Years: Club
- Doon
Inter-county
- Years: County
- 1986–2003: Offaly
Inter-county titles
- Leinster titles: 1
- NFL: 1

Vinny Claffey is an Irish former sportsman from Doon, County Offaly. He attended St Joseph & St Saran's Secondary School in Ferbane.

Claffey played Gaelic football with his home club Doon and was a member of the Offaly senior team from 1986 until 2003. He won a Leinster Senior Football Championship medal in 1997 and a National Football League medal in 1998. During Tommy Lyons reign as Offaly manager, Claffey formed part of the full-forward line that included Peter Brady and Roy Malone.

In late 2003, Offaly manager Gerry Fahey dropped Claffey from his panel.

== Honours ==
Senior

- Leinster Senior Football Championship (1): 1997
- National Football League Division 1 (1): 1998
- O'Byrne Cup (3): 1993, 1997, 1998

Under-21

- All-Ireland Under-21 Football Championship (1): 1988
- Leinster Under-21 Football Championship (2): 1986, 1988
