= Mick Ryan (Gaelic footballer) =

Offaly Gaelic footballer

Personal information
- Native name: Mícheál Ó Riain (Irish)
- Born: 1946 (age 79–80) Doon, County Offaly
- Height: 5 ft 11 in (180 cm)

Sport
- Sport: Gaelic football
- Position: Right corner-back
Clubs
- Years: Club
- 1960s 1960s–1980s: Doon; Erin's Isle
Inter-county
Years	County	Apps (scores)
1965–1976	Offaly	31 (0–0)
Inter-county titles
- Leinster titles: 4
- All-Irelands: 2
- NFL: 0
- All Stars: 2

Mick Ryan (born 1946 in Doon, County Offaly) is an Irish former sportsman. He played Gaelic football with Dublin-based club Erin's Isle and was a member of the Offaly senior team from 1965 until 1976.
