= 1999 Ulster Senior Football Championship final =

Ulster Championship Match

1999 Ulster SFC Final
- Event: 1999 Ulster Senior Football Championship
Armagh	Down
3-12 (21)	0-10 (10)
- Date: 1 August 1999
- Venue: St Tiernach's Park, Clones
- Referee: Paddy Russell (Tipperary)
- Attendance: 36,345

The 1999 Ulster Senior Football Championship Final was the showpiece game of that year's Ulster Championship, contested by Armagh and Down and played at St Tiernach's Park, Clones on 1 August 1999.

Armagh won the game by 3–12 to 0–10, thereby ending a 17-year wait for a provincial title.

== Details ==
1 August 1999
Final

Armagh	3-12 - 0-10	Down
O. McConville 2-7, D. Marsden 1-2, P. McGrane, J. McEntee, T McEntee	Report	S. Mulholland 0-4, C. McCabe 0-2 B. Burns, R. Carr, S. Ward, G. McCartan

Clones
Attendance: 36,345
Referee: Paddy Russell (Tipperary)

Armagh	Down

1	B Tierney
2	E McNulty
3	G Reid
4	J McNulty	(yellow card) 28'
5	K Hughes
6	K McGeeney	(yellow card) 31'
7	A McCann
8	J Burns (c)
9	P McGrane
10	P McKeever
11	J McEntee
12	J Rafferty	(substituted off) 50'
13	C O'Rourke	(substituted off) 69'
14	D Marsden
15	O McConville
Substitutes:
	T McEntee	(substituted in) 50'
	G Houlihan	(substituted in) 69'
Manager:
Brian McAlinden and Brian Canavan

1	M McVeigh
2	F Caulfield
3	Sean Ward	(yellow card) 24' (yellow card) 62' (red card)
4	P Matthews	(substituted off) 44'
5	P Higgins
6	M Magill	(yellow card) 19'
7	S Poland
8	B Burns
9	A Molloy
10	R Carr	(yellow card) 42'
11	S Mulholland
12	G Deegan
13	M Linden	(substituted off) 10'
14	C McCabe	(yellow card) 45'
15	Shane Ward
Substitutes:
	G McCartan	(substituted in) 33' (yellow card) 54'
	A Farrell	(substituted in) 58'
	J McCartan	(substituted in) 61'
Manager:
Pete McGrath

Man of the Match:
Oisín McConville (Armagh)
