= Donie Hanlon =

Offaly Gaelic footballer (1937–2023)

Personal information
- Native name: Dónal Ó hAnluain (Irish)
- Born: 1937 Gracefield, County Offaly, Ireland
- Died: 31 January 2023 (aged 85) Tullamore, County Offaly, Ireland
- Height: 5 ft 9 in (175 cm)

Sport
- Sport: Gaelic football
- Position: Full-forward
Clubs
- Years: Club
- Gracefield; St Patrick's
Club titles
- Offaly titles: 4
- Leinster titles: 1
Inter-county
- Years: County
- 1958–1964: Offaly
Inter-county titles
- Leinster titles: 2
- All-Irelands: 0
- NFL: 0

Donie Hanlon (1937 – 31 January 2023) was an Irish Gaelic footballer. At club level he played with Gracefield and at inter-county level with the Offaly senior team. Hanlon usually lined out as a forward.

== Playing career ==
Hanlon first played Gaelic football as a schoolboy at Portarlington CBS. He simultaneously lined out as a minor with the Gracefield club, before winning an Offaly JFC title in 1958. Hanlon was drafted onto the St Patrick's amalgamated team, and added an Offaly SFC title in 1959.

Hanlon was first selected for the Offaly senior football team during the 1958–59 league. He spent a season with the junior team before returning to the senior team as captain in 1960. Offaly won the Leinster SFC for the first time under Hanlon's captaincy. He was at full-forward when Offaly lost to Down in the 1961 All-Ireland SFC final.

== Death ==
Hanlon died on 31 January 2023, at the age of 85.

== Honours ==
Gracefield

- Leinster Senior Club Football Championship: 1961, 1970, 1972
- Offaly Senior Football Championship: 1961, 1970, 1972
- Offaly Junior Football Championship: 1958

St Patrick's

- Offaly Senior Football Championship: 1959

Offaly

- Leinster Senior Football Championship: 1960 (c), 1961

Awards
Preceded by	Offaly senior football team captain 1960	Succeeded by Willie Nolan
