= Roy Malone =

Irish Gaelic footballer

Roy Malone (born 1975/1976) is an Irish former Gaelic footballer who played for Rhode and the Offaly county team.

Malone played for the Offaly under-21 team. He won a Leinster Senior Football Championship (SFC) medal in 1997. He scored two goals in the final against Meath. Malone played alongside James Brady and Vinny Claffey in that team. Mayo then defeated Offaly in the 1997 All-Ireland Senior Football Championship semi-final. The following year, Malone won a National Football League medal. The Games Administration Committee gave Malone an eight-week ban in 2002, following that year's Leinster SFC semi-final replay. As of 2015, he continued to play for Rhode.
