= Tommy Cullen =

Irish Gaelic footballer (1939–2020)

Personal information
- Native name: Tomás Ó Cuilinn (Irish)
- Born: 1939 Edenderry, County Offaly, Ireland
- Died: 5 October 2020 (aged 81) Tullamore, County Offaly, Ireland
- Height: 5 ft 9 in (175 cm)

Sport
- Sport: Gaelic football
- Position: Right wing-forward
Club
- Years: Club
- Edenderry
Club titles
- Offaly titles: 1
Inter-county*
Years	County	Apps (scores)
1957–1968	Offaly	23
Inter-county titles
- Leinster titles: 2
- All-Irelands: 0
- NFL: 0
- *Inter County team apps and scores correct as of 22:42, 9 October 2020.

Thomas Cullen (1939 – 5 October 2020) was an Irish Gaelic footballer. At club level he had some success with Edenderry and was a two-time Leinster SFC winner with the Offaly senior team.

== Playing career ==
Cullen played club football with Edenderry. He began his inter-county career as a dual player with the Offaly minor teams that contested provincial finals in both hurling and Gaelic football in 1957. He was called up to the Offaly senior football panel during the 1957–58 National League and made his championship debut in the 1958 Leinster SFC. Cullen played a role in the Offaly breakthrough, claiming back-to-back Leinster SFC titles in 1960 and 1961, before losing to Down in the 1961 All-Ireland SFC final. He continued to line out for Offaly until June 1968 and in total he represented the team on 58 occasions, 23 times in the championship and 35 times in the league. At club level, Cullen won an Offaly County Championship with Edenderry when he was still a minor, while he also played a role in the club's rise to the senior ranks of Offaly hurling when the team won an Offaly JHC title in 1962 and an IHC title in 1963.

== Honours ==
Edenderry

- Offaly Senior Football Championship (1): 1957
- Offaly Intermediate Hurling Championship (1): 1963
- Offaly Junior Hurling Championship (1): 1962

Offaly

- Leinster Senior Football Championship (2): 1960, 1961
