= Willie Bryan =

Offaly Gaelic footballer

Personal information
- Native name: Liam Mac Braoin (Irish)
- Born: 1947 (age 78–79) Walsh Island, County Offaly
- Occupation: Company director

Sport
- Sport: Gaelic football
- Position: Midfield
Club
- Years: Club
- 1960s–1980s: Walsh Island
Club titles
- Offaly titles: 6
- Leinster titles: 2
Inter-county
Years	County	Apps (scores)
1965–1975	Offaly	36
Inter-county titles
- Leinster titles: 4
- All-Irelands: 2
- NFL: 0
- All Stars: 2

Willie Bryan (born 1947 in Walsh Island, County Offaly) is an Irish former Gaelic footballer who played for his local club Walsh Island and at senior level for the Offaly county team from 1966 until 1978. Bryan captained Offaly to the All-Ireland SFC title in 1971. He won one of the first All Stars at midfield in 1971 and another the following year in 1972. He also won footballer of the year 1972.

Sporting positions
Preceded by Eugene Mulligan	Offaly Senior Football Captain; 1971	Succeeded by Tony McTague
Achievements
Preceded by Donie O'Sullivan (Kerry)	All-Ireland SFC winning captain 1971	Succeeded by Tony McTague (Offaly)
Awards
Preceded by Eugene Mulligan (Offaly)	Texaco Footballer of the Year; 1972	Succeeded by Billy Morgan (Cork)
