= Enda Condron =

Laois Gaelic footballer

- Occupation: Gaelic footballer

Enda Condron is a former Gaelic footballer who played as a forward at senior level for the Laois county team during the 1960s and 1970s.

In 1967, he was part of the Laois team that won the Leinster Minor Football Championship.

In March 1975 he became the first Laoisman to win an All-Ireland Senior Club Football Championship medal when he appeared as a substitute for UCD in their 0-18 to 0-10 win over Queen's University in the final of the Sigerson Cup.

He assisted his home club Ballylinan to victory in the Laois Intermediate Football Championship in 1973.
