= Liam O'Connor (Gaelic footballer) =

Irish Gaelic footballer

Personal information
- Native name: Liam Ó Conchubhair (Irish)
- Born: 13 September 1955 Walsh Island, County Offaly, Ireland
- Died: 2 December 2013 (aged 58) Aglish, County Waterford, Ireland
- Occupation: Iarnród Éireann employee
- Height: 6 ft 3 in (191 cm)

Sport
- Sport: Gaelic football
- Position: Full-back
Club
- Years: Club
- 1970s–1990s: Walsh Island
Club titles
- Offaly titles: 6
- Leinster titles: 2
Inter-county
Years	County	Apps (scores)
1979–1986	Offaly	20 (0–0)
Inter-county titles
- Leinster titles: 3
- All-Irelands: 1
- NFL: 0
- All Stars: 1

Liam O'Connor (13 September 1955 – 2 December 2013) was an Irish Gaelic footballer who played as a full-back for the Offaly senior team.

Born in Walsh Island, County Offaly, O'Connor arrived on the inter-county scene at the age of twenty-three when he first linked up with the Offaly senior team when he made his debut in the 1979 championship. O'Connor went on to play a key part for the Offaly defence over the next few years, and won an All-Ireland SFC medal and three Leinster SFC medals. He was also an All-Ireland SFC runner-up on one occasion.

O'Connor was a member of the Leinster inter-provincial team on a number of occasions throughout his career, however, he never won a Railway Cup medal. At club level he was a two-time Leinster medallist with Walsh Island. He also won six successive championship medals with the club.

Throughout his career O'Connor made 20 championship appearances. His retirement came following Offaly's defeat by Louth in the 1986 championship.
