= John Conway (Gaelic footballer) =

Irish Gaelic footballer

Personal information
- Native name: Sean Ó Conbhuí (Irish)
- Born: County Laois

Sport
- Sport: Gaelic football
- Position: Centre Back
Club
- Years: Club
- Arles
Inter-county
- Years: County
- Laois

John Conway (also known by his Irish name Sean Ó Conbhuí) is a former Gaelic footballer from County Laois.

== Biography ==
He formerly played in defence for Laois and in 1968 (along with his brother JJ) was part of the Laois team that lost the Leinster Senior Football Championship final to Longford.
