= Tommy Drumm =

Dublin Gaelic footballer

Personal information
- Native name: Tomás Ó Droma (Irish)
- Born: 22 March 1955 (age 71) Whitehall, Dublin
- Occupation: Company director
- Height: 6 ft 0 in (183 cm)

Sport
- Sport: Gaelic football
- Position: Centre-back
Club
- Years: Club
- 1970s–1980s: Whitehall Colmcille
Inter-county
- Years: County
- 1976–1984: Dublin
Inter-county titles
- Leinster titles: 5
- All-Irelands: 3
- NFL: 0
- All Stars: 4

Tommy Drumm (born 22 March 1955) is an Irish former sportsman. He lived on Collins Avenue West. He attended (Primary) The School of the Holy Child, Larkhill, Whitehall, and (Secondary) St Aidan's Christian brothers School, Dublin 9. He played Gaelic football with his local club Whitehall Gaels, renamed Whitehall Colmcille's GAA and was a senior member of the Dublin county team from 1976 until 1984. Drumm captained Dublin to the All-Ireland title in 1983.

Sporting positions
Preceded by Mick Holden	Dublin Senior Football Captain; 1983–1984	Succeeded by Brian Mullins
Achievements
Preceded by Richie Connor (Offaly)	All-Ireland SFC winning captain 1983	Succeeded by Ambrose O'Donovan (Kerry)
Awards
Preceded by Jack O'Shea (Kerry)	Texaco Footballer of the Year; 1983	Succeeded by Jack O'Shea (Kerry)
