= Richie Connor =

Offaly Gaelic footballer

Personal information
- Native name: Risteard Ó Conchubhair (Irish)
- Born: Walsh Island, County Offaly
- Occupation: Primary school teacher

Sport
- Sport: Gaelic football
- Position: Midfield
Club
- Years: Club
- 1970s–1990s: Walsh Island
Club titles
- Offaly titles: 6
- Leinster titles: 2
Inter-county
- Years: County
- 1975–1989: Offaly
Inter-county titles
- Leinster titles: 3
- All-Irelands: 1
- NFL: 0
- All Stars: 1

Richie Connor (born 1954 in Walsh Island, County Offaly) is an Irish former Gaelic footballer who played for his local club Walsh Island and, from 1975 until 1989, at senior level for the Offaly county team. Walsh later served as manager of the Laois and Offaly senior football teams.

As a player, Connor was captain of the Offaly team which won the All-Ireland Senior Football Championship title in 1982, denying Kerry a 'five in a row' title. He played at centre forward that day, having appeared as centre back in earlier years.

Richie's only All-Star award came in 1981.

Richie's first success was with the Erins Hope team that won the Dublin under-21 title in 1974. He helped that club retain the title in 1975 and also won an Offaly under-21 medal with Walsh Island in the same year.

With Walsh Island, Richie was part of the team that won six Offaly Senior Football Championship titles in a row from 1978 to 1983. He was captain in 1981 and 1983.

He was interviewed for the documentary Players of the Faithful.

Connor was appointed manager of the Offaly senior team on a three-year-term in 2008, but resigned in February 2009.

Sporting positions
Preceded by	Offaly Senior Football Captain; 1980–1982	Succeeded by Martin Furlong
Preceded by Martin Furlong	Offaly Senior Football Captain; 1982	Succeeded by
Preceded by Bobby Miller	Laois Senior Football Manager; 1989–1993	Succeeded by Colm Browne
Preceded by Pat Roe	Offaly Senior Football Manager; 2008–2009	Succeeded by Tom Cribbin
Achievements
Preceded by Jimmy Deenihan (Kerry)	All-Ireland SFC winning captain 1982	Succeeded by Tommy Drumm (Dublin)
