= Peter Daly (Gaelic footballer) =

Irish Gaelic footballer and hurler (1940–2022)

Personal information
- Native name: Peadar Ó Dálaigh (Irish)
- Born: 21 September 1940 Tullamore, County Offaly, Ireland
- Died: 16 December 2022 (aged 82) Ennis, County Clare, Ireland
- Occupation: Army officer
- Height: 5 ft 11 in (180 cm)

Sport
- Sport: Gaelic football
- Position: Centre-forward
Clubs
- Years: Club
- Ballinamere; Tullamore
Club titles
- Offaly titles: 1
Inter-county
Years	County	Apps (scores)
1959–1962	Offaly	11
Inter-county titles
- Leinster titles: 2
- All-Irelands: 0
- NFL: 0

Peter M. Daly (21 September 1940 – 16 December 2022) was an Irish Gaelic footballer. At club level he played with Ballinamere and was also a member of the Offaly senior football team.

== Career ==
Daly was educated at Tullamore CBS, with whom he lined out in various Leinster Colleges' competitions. A dual player at minor levels in 1956, 1957 and 1958, he came onto the Offaly senior football team during the 1958–59 National League. Daly also lined out with the Offaly junior hurling team in 1959.

Daly won back-to-back Leinster SFC titles in 1960 and 1961, and lined out at centre-forward when Offaly were beaten by Down in the 1961 All-Ireland SFC final. He also earned inclusion on the All-Army selection in the representative game against the Combined Universities. Daly's other honours include an Offaly JHC with Ballinamere in 1959, an Offaly SHC with Tullamore in 1960, minor titles in both codes as well as Army tournament and athletics awards.

== Personal life and death ==
Daly enlisted in the Defence Forces in 1960 and was commissioned into the Infantry Corps as a Second-Lieutenant on a year later. He served in the Southern Command for much of his career. Daly also served overseas with the United Nations and was Chief Operations Officer with UNIFIL in 1992.

Daly died in Ennis, County Clare on 16 December 2022, at the age of 82.

== Honours ==
Ballinamere

- Offaly Junior Hurling Championship: 1959

Tullamore

- Offaly Senior Hurling Championship: 1960

Offaly

- Leinster Senior Football Championship: 1960, 1961
