= Harry Donnelly =

Irish Gaelic footballer (1937–2021)

Personal information
- Native name: Anraí Ó Donnaile (Irish)
- Nickname: Har
- Born: September 1937 Kilcormac, County Offaly, Ireland
- Died: 4 February 2021 (aged 83) Arklow, County Wicklow, Ireland
- Occupation: Air Corps member
- Height: 5 ft 9 in (175 cm)

Sport
- Sport: Gaelic football
- Position: Right corner-forward
Clubs
- Years: Club
- Athlone; Air Corps
Club titles
- Dublin titles: 0
Inter-county*
Years	County	Apps (scores)
1954–1958	Offaly	18
Inter-county titles
- Leinster titles: 2
- All-Irelands: 0
- NFL: 0
- *Inter County team apps and scores correct as of 22:42, 4 February 2021.

Ronald Henry Donnelly (September 1937 – 4 February 2021), known as Har Donnelly, was an Irish Gaelic footballer.

== Career ==
Born in Kilcormac, County Offaly of a Dublin-born father and an Offaly-born mother, Donnelly and his family moved to Athlone at an early age. Here he received an education and a Gaelic football tuition in the Marist College. With the college Donnelly played in various Leinster competitions, and, in County Westmeath juvenile and minor championships, he lined out with the Athlone club. Shortly after he joined the Air Corps in 1955 he lined out with Dublin's "Offaly Exiles", who invited him to play in a number of challenge matches which brought him to the attention of the Offaly selectors. After making his competitive debut in the 1958 Leinster Championship, Donnelly made a combined total of 50 league-championship appearances in a six-year career. During that time he claimed back-to-back Leinster SFC titles and played at left corner-forward when Offaly made their maiden appearance in an All-Ireland SFC final in 1961.

Donnelly died on 4 February 2021, aged 83.

== Honours ==
Offaly

- Leinster Senior Football Championship: 1960, 1961

Leinster

- Railway Cup; 1962
