= Mick Lowry =

Offaly Gaelic footballer

Personal information
- Native name: Mícheál Ó Labhraí (Irish)
- Born: 8 October 1960 (age 66) Ferbane, County Offaly, Ireland
- Occupation: ESB employee
- Height: 5 ft 9 in (175 cm)

Sport
- Sport: Gaelic football
- Position: Right corner-back
Club
- Years: Club
- Ferbane
Club titles
- Offaly titles: 7
Inter-county*
Years	County	Apps (scores)
1980–1991	Offaly	23 (0–0)
Inter-county titles
- Leinster titles: 2
- All-Irelands: 1
- NFL: 0
- All Stars: 0
- *Inter County team apps and scores correct as of 16:40, 30 December 2016.

Mick Lowry (born 8 October 1960) is an Irish former Gaelic footballer whose league and championship career with the Offaly senior county team spanned eleven seasons from 1980 to 1991.

Lowry attended St Joseph & St Saran's Secondary School in Ferbane.

He made his senior debut for Offaly during the 1980–81 league. Over the course of the next eleven seasons, he won many medals with his county. Lowry won an All-Ireland SFC title in 1982. Lowry also won two Leinster SFC medals. He played his last game for Offaly in July 1991.

Lowry's brothers, Seán and Brendan, also won All-Ireland SFC medals with Offaly in 1982. His nephew, Shane, is a professional golfer.

== Honours ==
Ferbane

- Offaly Senior Football Championship (7): 1986, 1987, 1988, 1989, 1990, 1992, 1994

Offaly

- All-Ireland Senior Football Championship (1): 1982
- Leinster Senior Football Championship (2): 1981, 1982
