= Johnny Egan (Offaly Gaelic footballer) =

Irish Gaelic footballer

Personal information
- Native name: Seán Mac Aogáin (Irish)
- Born: 26 September 1939 Doon, County Offaly, Ireland
- Died: 14 December 2015 (aged 76) Dublin, Ireland
- Occupation: Hotelier
- Height: 5 ft 9 in (175 cm)

Sport
- Sport: Gaelic football
- Position: Left corner-back
Clubs
- Years: Club
- Doon; Ballycumber; Kickhams
Inter-county
Years	County	Apps (scores)
1957–1970	Offaly	35 (0–0)
Inter-county titles
- Leinster titles: 2
- All-Irelands: 0
- NFL: 0

John Francis Egan (26 September 1939 – 14 December 2015) was an Irish Gaelic footballer who played as a left corner-back for the Offaly senior county team.

Born in Doon, County Offaly, Egan first arrived on the inter-county scene when he linked up with the Offaly minor team. Named on the Offaly Football Team of the Century and regarded as one of his county's finest ever footballers, he made his senior debut during the 1957–58 league. Egan went on to play a key role for over a decade and had 99 league and championship appearances and won two Leinster SFC medals on the field of play. He was an All-Ireland SFC runner-up on two occasions, in 1961 and 1969. He played in front of a record crowd of 90,556 against Down in 1961. He captained the team in 1969.

At club level Egan began his career with Doon before later playing with Ballycumber and, after moving to Dublin for work, Kickhams in Dublin.

Throughout Egan's inter-county career, of his 99 appearances, 35 were championship appearances for Offaly. His retirement came during the conclusion of the 1970–71 league and Egan's last game for Offaly was in November 1970 when he lined out in his customary corner back position against Longford in the National Football League.

Sporting positions
Preceded by Pat Monaghan	Offaly Senior Football Captain; 1969	Succeeded by Eugene Mulligan
