= Eugene Mulligan =

Offaly Gaelic footballer

Personal information
- Native name: Eoghan Ó Maolagáin (Irish)
- Born: 1949 (age 76–77) Rhode, County Offaly
- Height: 5 ft 0 in (152 cm)

Sport
- Sport: Gaelic football
- Position: Right wing-back
Club
- Years: Club
- 1960s–1980s: Rhode
Club titles
- Offaly titles: 4
Inter-county
Years	County	Apps (scores)
1968–1980	Offaly	41
Inter-county titles
- Leinster titles: 5
- All-Irelands: 2
- NFL: 0
- All Stars: 1

Eugene Mulligan (born 1949 in Rhode, County Offaly) is an Irish former Gaelic footballer. He played for his local club Rhode and was a member of the Offaly senior county team from 1968 until 1980.

Sporting positions
Preceded by Pat Monaghan	Offaly Senior Football Captain; 1970	Succeeded by Willie Bryan
Awards
Preceded by Tom Prendergast (Kerry)	Texaco Footballer of the Year; 1971	Succeeded by Willie Bryan (Offaly)
