= 1980 All-Ireland Senior Football Championship =

Football championship

Championship details
- Dates: 11 May – 21 September 1980
- Teams: 33

All-Ireland Champions
- Winning team: Kerry (26th win)
- Captain: Ger Power
- Manager: Mick O'Dwyer

All-Ireland Finalists
- Losing team: Roscommon
- Captain: Danny Murray
- Manager: Tom Heneghan

Provincial Champions
- Munster: Kerry
- Leinster: Offaly
- Ulster: Armagh
- Connacht: Roscommon

Championship statistics
- No. matches played: 33
- Top Scorer: Matt Connor (5–31)
- Player of the Year: Jack O'Shea

The 1980 All-Ireland Senior Football Championship was the 94th staging of the All-Ireland Senior Football Championship, the Gaelic Athletic Association's premier inter-county Gaelic football tournament. The championship began on 11 May 1980 and ended on 21 September 1980.

Kerry entered the championship as the defending champions.

On 21 September 1980, Kerry won the championship following a 1–9 to 1–6 defeat of Roscommon in the All-Ireland final. This was their 26th All-Ireland title and their third in succession.

Offaly's Matt Connor was the championship's top scorer with 5–31. Kerry's Jack O'Shea was named as the Texaco Footballer of the Year.

== Munster Championship format change ==
Following a number of one-sided results in the Munster Championship in the late 1970s, the Munster Council changed the format in 1980. Kerry, long regarded as the standard bearers in the province, were given a bye to the Munster final. Cork, who had been second to Kerry since 1975, were given a bye to a lone semi-final. The other four "weaker" teams (Clare, Limerick, Tipperary and Waterford) were paired against each other in two preliminary round games. The winners of these two games faced each other in a lone quarter-final with the winners of that game qualifying to meet Cork in the lone semi-final. This format was previously used in 1941 and lasted only one season.

== Results ==
=== Connacht Senior Football Championship ===
Quarter-finals

1 June 1980 Quarter-final	Roscommon	9–19 – 1–10	London	Dr. Hyde Park, Roscommon
	M Finneran 3–3, T McManus 3–3, D Earley 1–5, J O'Connor 1–3, M Dolphin 1–1, E McManus 0–4.		E Blake 0–4, D Barrett 1–0, J Keoghan 0–2, S Hehir 0–1, J Dunne 0–1, B McCamley 0–1, P Cavavan 0–1.	Referee: J Lee (Sligo)

8 June 1980 Quarter-final	Sligo	1–7 – 2–11	Mayo	Markievicz Park, Sligo
	M Laffey 1–5, F Henry 0–1, J Kearins 0–1.		T O'Malley 1–2, G Farragher 1–1, M Kearney 0–4, TJ Kilgallon 0–1, J Bourke 0–1, J McGrath 0–1, G Feeney 0–1.	Referee: T Moran (Leitrim)

Semi-finals

15 June 1980 Semi-final	Galway	0–10 – 1–14	Roscommon	Tuam Stadium, Tuam
	S Joyce 0–5, G McManus 0–2, S Burke 0–1, B Brennan 0–1, B Joyce 0–1.		T McManus 1–2, D Earley 0–3, M Finneran 0–3, J O'Connor 0–3, G Connellan 0–2, E McManus 0–1.	Referee: P Gorman (Sligo)

22 June 1980 Semi-final	Mayo	1–17 – 1–8	Leitrim	St. Tiernach's Park, Crossmolina
	J McGrath 0–8, J Burke 1–1, G Farragher 0–4, T O'Malley 0–3, J Maughan 0–1.		M martin 1–5, O Honeyman 0–2, D McNulty 0–1.	Referee: T Cunningham (Galway)

Final

13 July 1980 Final	Roscommon	3–13 – 0–8	Mayo	Dr. Hyde Park, Roscommon
	M Finneran 1–5, J O'Connor 1–3, T McManus 1–1, E McManus 0–2, D Earley 0–1, J O'Gara 0–1.		J McGrath 0–5, M Carney 0–2, G Farragher 0–1.	Attendance: 17,880; Referee: M Kearins (Sligo)

=== Leinster Senior Football Championship ===
First round

11 May 1980 First round	Westmeath	2–15 – 0–4	Kilkenny	O'Moore Park, Portlaoise

11 May 1980 First round	Carlow	2–11 – 2–17	Kildare	Dr. Cullen Park, Carlow
	W Cullen 2–5, P Delaney 0–2, N Bambrick 0–2, D Byrne 0–1, C Hughes 0–1.		T Shaw 1–4, T Carew 1–2, P O'Flaherty 0–5, N Byrne 0–2, J O'Rourke 0–1, D Reilly 0–1, P Kelly 0–1, G Power 0–1.	Referee: M Meally (Kilkenny)

18 May 1980 First round	Laois	5–12 – 1–10	Longford	O'Moore Park, Portlaoise

18 May 1980 First round	Wexford	1–13 – 3–10	Louth	Croke Park, Dublin
	S Fitzhenry 1–2, G Byrne 0–2, T Wright 0–2, M McCarthy 0–1.		J McDonnell 2–4, JP Kane 1–1, A Wiseman 0–2, K Dawe 0–2 E Marmian 0–2, D Kelleher 0–1, P Lennon 0–1.	Referee: T Jordan (Dublin)

Quarter-finals

1 June 1980 Quarter-final	Kildare	1–13 – 0–4	Wicklow	Croke Park, Dublin
	T Shaw 1–6, P Flaherty 0–2, M Moore 0–2, M Condon 0–1, J Kelly 0–1, G Power 0–1.		P Byrne 0–1, P O'Toole 0–1, T Murphy 0–1, P Baker 0–1.	Referee: D Guerin (Dublin)

1 June 1980 Quarter-final	Offaly	0–13 – 0–7	Louth	Croke Park, Dublin
	M Connor 0–7, P Fenning 0–4, J Mooney 0–2.		K Dawe 0–3, A Wiseman 0–2, P Lennon 0–1, J McDonnell 0–1.	Attendance: 13,303; Referee: P Kelly (Dublin)

8 June 1980 Quarter-final	Dublin	2–14 – 2–8	Laois	O'Connor Park, Tullamore
	C Duff 0–5, D Hickey 1–0, B Mullins 1–0, A O'Toole 0–2, A Roche 0–2, J Caffrey 0–2, B Brogan 0–1, J Ronayne 0–1, PJ Buckley 0–1.		T Prendergast 0–5, J Hovendon 1–0, J Costello 1–0, W Brennan 0–2, B Miller 0–1.	Attendance: 17,000; Referee: P Collins (Westmeath)

15 June 1980 Quarter-final	Meath	4–12 – 1–5	Westmeath	O'Connor Park, Tullamore
	F Barry 1–5, W Smith 1–1, F O'Sullivan 0–4, P Finnerty 1–0, J Cassells 1–0, C Reilly 0–1, C O'Rourke 0–1.		C Flanagan 1–0, W Lowry 0–1, M Kilcoyne 0–1, E Coughlan 0–1, D Corrigan 0–1, J Keane 0–1.	Referee: S Aldridge (Kildare)

Semi-finals

29 June 1980 Semi-final	Offaly	2–14 – 1–10	Kildare	Croke Park, Dublin
	M Connor 2–8, A O'Halloran 0–4, K Kilmurray 0–1, S Lalor 0–1.		G Power 1–1, T Carew 0–2, N Byrne 0–2, M Moore 0–1, T Shaw 0–1, P Flaherty 0–1, D Reilly 0–1, D Bergin 0–1.	Attendance: 13,046; Referee: P Kavanagh (Meath)

6 July 1980 Semi-final	Meath	2–7 – 3–13	Dublin	Páirc Tailteann, Navan
	E Barry 1–2, L Smyth 1–1, C O'Rourke 0–3, F O'Sullivan 0–1.		B Doyle 1–3, J Ronayne 1–2, B Brogan 1–1, A O'Toole 0–2, C Duff 0–2, B Rock 0–1, K Moran 0–1, PJ Buckley 0–1.	Referee: H Reilly (Louth)

Final

27 July 1980 Final	Offaly	1–10 – 1–8	Dublin	Croke Park, Dublin
	Matt Connor 1–7 (0-3f), Aiden O'Halloran 0–2, Gerry Carroll 0–1.		Bobby Doyle 1–1, Barney Rock 0-3f, Tommy Drumm, Anton O'Toole, David Hickey, John Caffrey 0–1 each	Attendance: 50,276; Referee: Paddy Kavanagh (Meath)

=== Munster Senior Football Championship ===
Preliminary round

11 May 1980 Preliminary round	Waterford	2–10 – 1–15	Tipperary	Fraher Field, Dungarvan
	M Hackett 1–2, S Aherne 0–4, J Hennessy 1–0, J Moloney 0–2, L Looby 0–1, T Hayes 0–1.		M Downes 0–5, H Mulcaire 1–1, S Sherlock 0–4, C Flaherty 0–2, B kennedy 0–2, E McGrath 0–1.	Referee: J Dennigan (Cork)

11 May 1980 Preliminary round	Clare	1–11 – 1–11	Limerick	Páirc Uí Seancháin, Doonbeg
	N Roche 0–4, M Keogh 1–0, B Reilly 0–3, S Moloney 0–3, T Curtin 0–1.		A Moran 0–5, F Ryan 1–1, C Walsh 0–2, G Collins 0–2, P Ryan 0–1.

25 May 1980 Preliminary round replay	Limerick	0–10 – 0–9	Clare	Gaelic Grounds, Limerick
	A Moran 0–7, C Walsh 0–2, G Collins 0–1.		B O'Reilly 0–3, N Normoyle 0–1, J McGrath 0–1, M Downes 0–1, S O'Doherty 0–1, P Garry 0–1, T Curtis 0–1.	Referee: J Conway (Kerry)

Quarter-final

1 June 1980 Quarter-final	Tipperary	2–7 – 1–11	Limerick	Semple Stadium, Thurles
	K Barron 1–1, M Keating 1–1, C McGrath 0–3, B Kennedy 0–2.		A Moran 0–6, K Hanley 1–1, C Walsh 0–3.	Referee: W Fogarty (Kerry)

Semi-final

8 June 1980 Semi-final	Cork	5–19 – 1–6	Limerick	Páirc Uí Chaoimh, Cork
	D Allen 2–4, T Dalton 1–6, D Barry 1–3, J Allen 1–0, S Murphy 0–3, C Ryan 0–1, D Barron 0–1, T Creedon 0–1.		P Ryan 1–0, A Moran 0–3, C Walsh 0–1, T Cummins 0–1, K Hanley 0–1.	Referee: W Fogarty (Kerry)

Final

6 July 1980 Final	Cork	0–12 – 3–13	Kerry	Páirc Uí Chaoimh, Cork
	Dinny Allen 0–5 (0-2f), Tom Creedon 0-3f, Tadhg O'Reilly 0–2, Christy Ryan and Tim Dalton 0–1 each		Eoin Liston 2–1, Ger Power 1–2, Pat Spillane 0–5, Mikey Sheehy 0-3f, Tommy Doyle and John Egan 0–1 each	Attendance: 43,360; Referee: Pat Lane (Limerick)

=== Ulster Senior Football Championship ===
Preliminary round

18 May 1980 Preliminary round	Antrim	1–7 – 1–8	Tyrone	Casement Park, Belfast

Quarter-finals

25 May 1980 Quarter-final	Down	1–4 – 0–13	Monaghan	Pairc Esler, Newry
	L Austin 1–0, D Morgan 0–2, J McCartan 0–2.		K Finlay 0–8, B Brady 0–3, D Mulligan 0–1, G McCarville 0–1.	Attendance: 10,000; Referee: J Heaney (Tyrone)

1 June 1980 Quarter-final	Fermanagh	1–4 – 3–8	Armagh	St. Molaise Park, Irvinestown
	F Sherry 1–0, J Cleary 0–3, B O'Reilly 0–1.		S Devlin 1–2, J Smyth 1–2, C McKinstrey 1–0, P Moriarty 0–1, D McCoy 0–1, M Murphy 0–1, B Canavan 0–1.	Referee: S Curry (Cavan)

8 June 1980 Quarter-final	Derry	2–7 – 2–9	Cavan	Dean McGlinchey Park, Ballinascreen
	C McKee 1–1, M Moran 1–1, I Doherty 0–1, G McElhinney 0–1, B McGoldrick 0–1, M Lynch 0–1, A McGurk 0–1.		P McNamee 2–2, S Cole 0–3, D Donohoe 0–2, F McDonagh 0–1, C O'Keeffe 0–1.	Referee: S Murray (Monaghan)

15 June 1980 Quarter-final	Donegal	0–8 – 1–17	Tyrone	St. Molaise Park, Irvinestown
	S Reilly 0–6, S Bonner 0–2.		M Harte 0–5, P Hetherington 0–5, A Hamilton 1–0, P Donnelly 0–3, D O'Hagan 0–2, P Kerlin 0–2.	Referee: H Duggan (Armagh)

Semi-finals

22 June 1980 Semi-final	Monaghan	0–5 – 0–12	Armagh	Breffni Park, Cavan
	K Finlay 0–3, G McCarville 0–1, K Treanor 0–1.		P Loughran 0–4, S Devlin 0–3, N Marley 0–1, J Kernan 0–1, M Murphy 0–1, F McMahon 0–1, B Hughes 0–1.	Attendance: 17,224; Referee: J Heaney (Tyrone)

29 June 1980 Semi-final	Tyrone	2–12 – 1–9	Cavan	St. Tiernach's Park, Clones
	P Kerlin 2–1, P Hetherington 0–4, D O'Hagan 0–3, K McCabe 0–2, G Taggart 0–1, M Harte 0–1.		C O'Keeffe 1–1, P McNamee 0–3, D Donoghue 0–2, P McGill 0–1, O Martin 0–1, B Tierney 0–1.	Attendance: 10,000; Referee: S McManus (Fermanagh)

Final

20 July 1980 Final	Tyrone	4–7 – 4–10	Armagh	St. Tiernach's Park, Clones
	D O'Hagan 2–1, P Hetherington 1–2, P Kerlin 1–0, G Taggart 0–2, M Harte 0–2.		J Kernan 2–1, P Loughran 0–5, B Hughes 1–1, H Kernan 1–0, J Smyth 0–2, N Marley 0–1.	Attendance: 25,000; Referee: S Murray (Monaghan)

=== All-Ireland Senior Football Championship ===
Semi-finals

10 August 1980 Semi-final	Roscommon	2–20 – 3–11	Armagh	Croke Park, Dublin
	M Finneran 1–8, A McManus 1–2, J O'Connor 0–4, D Earley 0–3, J O'Gara 0–1, A Dooley 0–1, D Murray 0–1.		P Loughran 1–4, M Murphy 1–2, J Smyth 1–0, B Canavan 0–2, J Kernan 0–2, B Hughes 0–1.	Attendance: 36,043; Referee: Seamus Aldridge (Kildare)

24 August 1980 Semi-final	Kerry	4–15 – 4–10	Offaly	Croke Park, Dublin
	P Spillane 2–2, J Egan 1–4, M Sheehy 1–3, G Power 0–2, T Doyle 0–2, D Moran 0–1, E Liston 0–1.		M Connor 2–9, G Carroll 2–1.	Attendance: 36,125; Referee: P Collins (Westmeath)

Final

21 September 1980 Final	Kerry	1–9 – 1–6	Roscommon	Croke Park, Dublin
	M Sheehy 1–6, J O'Shea 0–1, G Power 0–1, P Spillane 0–1.		J O'Connor 1–2, D Earley 0–1, S Hayden 0–1, J O'Gara 0–1, M Finneran 0–1.	Attendance: 65,898; Referee: S Murray (Monaghan)

== Championship statistics ==
=== Top scorers ===
Overall

Rank	Player	County	Tally	Total	Matches	Average
1	Matt Connor	Offaly	5–31	46	4	11.50
2	Michael Finneran	Roscommon	5–20	35	5	7.00
3	Tony McManus	Roscommon	6–8	26	5	5.20

Single game

Rank	Player	County	Tally	Total	Opposition
1	Matt Connor	Offaly	2–9	15	Kerry
2	Matt Connor	Offaly	2–8	14	Kildare
3	Michael Finneran	Roscommon	3–3	12	London
3	Tony McManus	Roscommon	3–3	12	London
5	Willie Cullen	Carlow	2–5	11	Kildare
5	Michael Finneran	Roscommon	1–8	11	Armagh
7	Jim McDonnell	Louth	2–4	10	Wexford
7	Dinny Allen	Cork	2–4	10	Limerick
7	Matt Connor	Offaly	1–7	10	Dublin
10	Tom Shaw	Kildare	1–6	9	Wicklow
10	Tim Dalton	Cork	1–6	9	Limerick
10	Mikey Sheehy	Kerry	1–6	9	Roscommon

=== Miscellaneous ===
- Limerick beat Clare for the first time since 1945 after a replay.
- Navan host Dublin vs Meath fixture for the first time since 1961 the only meeting between played outside Croke Park until Portlaoise fixture in 2025.
- At the Munster final between Cork and Kerry at Páirc Uí Chaoimh, Cork Secretary of the Cork County Board Frank Murphy delivered an oration in honour of Tom Barry, a guerrilla leader during the War of Independence. Barry had died in the week leading up to the game.
- Roscommon win the Connacht title for the fourth year in a row being the only time its happened not to be Galway/Mayo.
- Offaly stop Dublin to 7 Leinster titles in a row in the Leinster final.
- Roscommon play in the All Ireland final for the first time since 1962.
- The All Ireland semifinal between Kerry and Offaly sets a new record for goals (8) in a semifinal. It would not be equalled until 2020 and as of July 2022, it has not been surpassed.
