= Greg Hughes (Gaelic footballer) =

Irish Gaelic footballer (1939–2014)

Personal information
- Native name: Gréagóir Ó hAodha (Irish)
- Nickname: The prince of full-backs
- Born: 17 November 1939 Cloghan, County Offaly, Ireland
- Died: 15 May 2014 (aged 75) Lorrha, County Tipperary, Ireland
- Occupation: Bank official

Sport
- Sport: Gaelic football
- Position: Full-back
Clubs
- Years: Club
- Cloghan; St Rynagh's; Gaeil Colmcille
Club titles
- Meath titles: 2
Inter-county
Years	County	Apps (scores)
1958–1971	Offaly	36
Inter-county titles
- Leinster titles: 3
- All-Irelands: 0
- NFL: 0

Greg Hughes (17 November 1939 – 15 May 2014) was an Irish Gaelic footballer who played as a full-back for the Offaly senior team.

Born in Cloghan, County Offaly, Hughes first arrived on the inter-county scene when he linked up with the Offaly senior team at the age of nineteen. He made his senior debut in the 1958. Hughes went on to play a key role for over a decade, and won three Leinster SFC medals. An All-Ireland SFC runner-up on two occasions, Hughes won an All-Ireland SFC medal as a non-playing substitute.

Hughes represented the Leinster inter-provincial team on a number of occasions, winning three Railway Cup medals. At club level he played with Cloghan, St Rynagh's and Gaeil Colmcille, with whom he won two championship medals.

Throughout his inter-county career, Hughes made 36 championship appearances for Offaly. His retirement came following the conclusion of the 1971 championship.

His brother, Patsy Hughes, also played with Offaly.

In retirement from playing Hughes became involved in team management and coaching. At inter-county level he guided the Offaly under-21 team to Leinster success before later taking charge of the Offaly senior team. Hughes also trained the St Rynagh's senior football team.

== Honours ==
=== Player ===
Gaeil Colmcille

- Meath Senior Football Championship (2): 1966, 1968

Offaly

- All-Ireland Senior Football Championship (1): 1971 (sub)
- Leinster Senior Football Championship (4): 1960, 1961, 1969, 1971 (sub)

Leinster

- Railway Cup (3): 1959, 1961, 1962 (c)

=== Manager ===
St Rynagh's

- Offaly Senior B Football Championship (1): 1988

Offaly

- Leinster Under-21 Football Championship (1): 1986

Achievements
Preceded by Willie Nolan (Leinster)	Railway Cup Football Final winning captain 1962	Succeeded by Jim McDonnell (Cavan)
