= Walsh Island GAA =

Gaelic games club in County Offaly, Ireland

Walsh Island
- Inis na mBreatnach
- Founded: 1930
- County: Offaly
- Nickname: The Island
- Colours: Green and White
- Grounds: O'Connor Park, Walsh Island

Playing kits
Standard colours

Senior Club Championships
| | All Ireland | Leinster champions | Offaly champions |
|---|---|---|---|
| Football: | 0 | 2 | 12 |

Walsh Island is a Gaelic Athletic Association club located in the village of Walsh Island in County Offaly, Ireland. With 12 Senior Football wins and 2 Leinster Championship wins, they are one of the most successful clubs in the Offaly.

== History ==
Before the club was formed in 1930, many players from Walsh Island played for nearby Geashill GAA. It was decided that the club's colours would be the green and white hoops of Shamrock Rovers, the top football club in Ireland. The hoops did not clash with any club colours in North Offaly and were adopted as the colours. The first match played by Walsh Island was against Ballykeane. The club won the Offaly Senior Football Championship in 1933, their first year in the competition. Walsh Island was now the dominant team in the county and remained so until 1943.

After many years the club became the dominant force in Offaly once more in 1977, losing the Championship Semi Final to Tullamore GAA that year and winning it for the next six consecutive years. In 1979 and 1980 Walsh island won the Leinster Senior Club Football Championship, becoming one of the only clubs in Leinster to have 2 consecutive wins in the competition and the second club from Offaly to win it.

== Honours ==
- Leinster Senior Club Football Championships: 2
  - 1979, 1980
- Offaly Senior Football Championships: 12
  - 1933, 1934, 1937, 1938, 1942, 1943, 1978, 1979, 1980, 1981, 1982, 1983
- Offaly Intermediate Football Championship (1)
  - 2009
- Offaly Under-21 Football Championship
  - 1974
- Offaly Junior Football Championship (3)
  - 1932, 1961, 1996

== Notable players ==
- Richie Connor
- Willie Bryan
- Matt Connor
- Liam Connor
- Tomás O'Connor

| Preceded by Walsh Island | Offaly Senior Football Champions; 1983 | Succeeded by Gracefield |

| Preceded by Walsh Island | Leinster Senior Football Champions; 1980 | Succeeded by Walterstown |
