= Brendan Lowry =

Offaly Gaelic footballer

Personal information
- Native name: Breandán Mac Labhraí (Irish)
- Born: 19 July 1959 (age 67) Ferbane, County Offaly, Ireland
- Occupation: Post office worker
- Height: 5 ft 11 in (180 cm)

Sport
- Sport: Gaelic football
- Position: Left corner-forward
Club
- Years: Club
- Ferbane
Inter-county
Years	County	Apps (scores)
1981–1992	Offaly	27 (8–58)
Inter-county titles
- Leinster titles: 2
- All-Irelands: 1
- NFL: 0
- All Stars: 1

Brendan Lowry (born 11 July 1959) is an Irish former Gaelic footballer who played for his local club Ferbane and for the Offaly senior county team from 1981 until 1992. He attended St Joseph & St Saran's Secondary School in Ferbane.

Lowry scored 0–3 to help his team to victory in the 1982 All-Ireland Senior Football Championship final, the most recent occasion that Offaly won the Sam Maguire Cup. His brothers Mick and Seán also played in the 1982 All-Ireland SFC winning side.

Lowry managed the Westmeath senior team between 1997 and 2000. He received a controversial six-month ban (which was later lifted) after protesting against a tackle on Dessie Dolan in the 2000 O'Byrne Cup final.

His son Shane, a professional golfer, won the 2009 Irish Open, as an amateur, and the Amgen Irish Open in 2026 as a professional.

He won the 2019 Open Championship at Portrush.
