= Tony McTague =

Irish Gaelic footballer

Personal information
- Born: January 1946 (age 80) Clonakilty, County Cork, Ireland
- Occupation: ESB worker
- Height: 5 ft 9 in (175 cm)

Sport
- Sport: Gaelic football
- Position: Left wing-forward
Club
- Years: Club
- 1960s–1980s: Ferbane
Club titles
- Offaly titles: 3
Inter-county
Years	County	Apps (scores)
1964–1975	Offaly	36 (4–205)
Inter-county titles
- Leinster titles: 4
- All-Irelands: 2
- NFL: 0
- All Stars: 2

Tony McTague (born January 1946 in Clonakilty, County Cork) is an Irish former Gaelic footballer who played for the Ferbane club and at senior level for the Offaly county team from 1965 until 1975.

McTague captained Offaly to the All-Ireland SFC title in 1972.

He was inducted into the GAA Hall of Fame in 2013.

McTague is his county's top scorer in National Football League history, finishing his career with 9–360 (387) in that competition.

Sporting positions
Preceded by Willie Bryan	Offaly Senior Football Captain; 1972	Succeeded by Pat Keenan
Achievements
Preceded by Willie Bryan (Offaly)	All-Ireland SFC winning captain 1972	Succeeded by Billy Morgan (Cork)
