= Seán Ryan (Offaly Gaelic footballer) =

Irish Gaelic footballer

Personal information
- Native name: Seán Ó Riain (Irish)
- Born: 1939 Ballinahown, County Offaly, Ireland
- Died: 1 March 2012 (aged 73) Portarlington, County Offaly, Ireland
- Occupation: Mechanic

Sport
- Sport: Gaelic football
- Position: Midfield
Clubs
- Years: Club
- Doon; St Monica's
Club titles
- Offaly titles: 0
Inter-county*
| Years | County | Apps (scores) |
| 1959–1966 | Offaly | 17 |
Inter-county titles
- Leinster titles: 2
- All-Irelands: 0
- NFL: 0
- *Inter County team apps and scores correct as of 00:10, 2 January 2017.

Seán Ryan (1939 - 1 March 2012) was an Irish Gaelic footballer. His league and championship career with the Offaly senior team spanned nine seasons from 1959 to 1966.

Ryan made his senior debut for Offaly during the 1958–59 league. Over the course of the next nine seasons he won two Leinster SFC medals. Ryan played his last game for Offaly in November 1966.

He played for St Monica's while working with Aer Lingus in London.

== Honours ==
Offaly

- Leinster Senior Football Championship (2): 1960, 1961
