= Martin Furlong =

Offaly Gaelic football goalkeeper

Personal information
- Native name: Máirtín Furlong (Irish)
- Born: 14 September 1946 (age 80) Tullamore, County Offaly
- Occupation: Retired
- Height: 5 ft 9 in (175 cm)

Sport
- Sport: Gaelic football
- Position: Goalkeeper
Club
- Years: Club
- 1963–1985: Tullamore
Club titles
- Offaly titles: 3
Inter-county
Years	County	Apps (scores)
1966–1985	Offaly	62 (0–0)
Inter-county titles
- Leinster titles: 7
- All-Irelands: 3
- NFL: 0
- All Stars: 4

Martin Furlong (born 14 September 1946 in Tullamore, County Offaly) is an Irish former Gaelic footballer who played for his local club Tullamore and was the first-choice goalkeeper at senior level on the Offaly county team from 1966 until 1985. Furlong is the only Offaly player to have won three All-Ireland SFC medals in 1971, 1972 and 1982. He also won an All-Ireland Minor Football Championship in 1964. He won the Texaco Footballer of the Year in 1982 after Offaly's All-Ireland SFC win.

In 1989 Martin moved from Clonminch, Tullamore to America following the request of him older brother Tom, to assist him in running his bar. Martin continues to live in New York, two of his sons live in America, one son and his only daughter returned to Ireland.

He was interviewed from his American base for the documentary Players of the Faithful.

In May 2020, the Irish Independent named Furlong as one of the "dozens of brilliant players" who narrowly missed selection for its "Top 20 footballers in Ireland over the past 50 years".
