= Doon, County Offaly =

Coordinates: 53°19′57″N 7°49′20″W

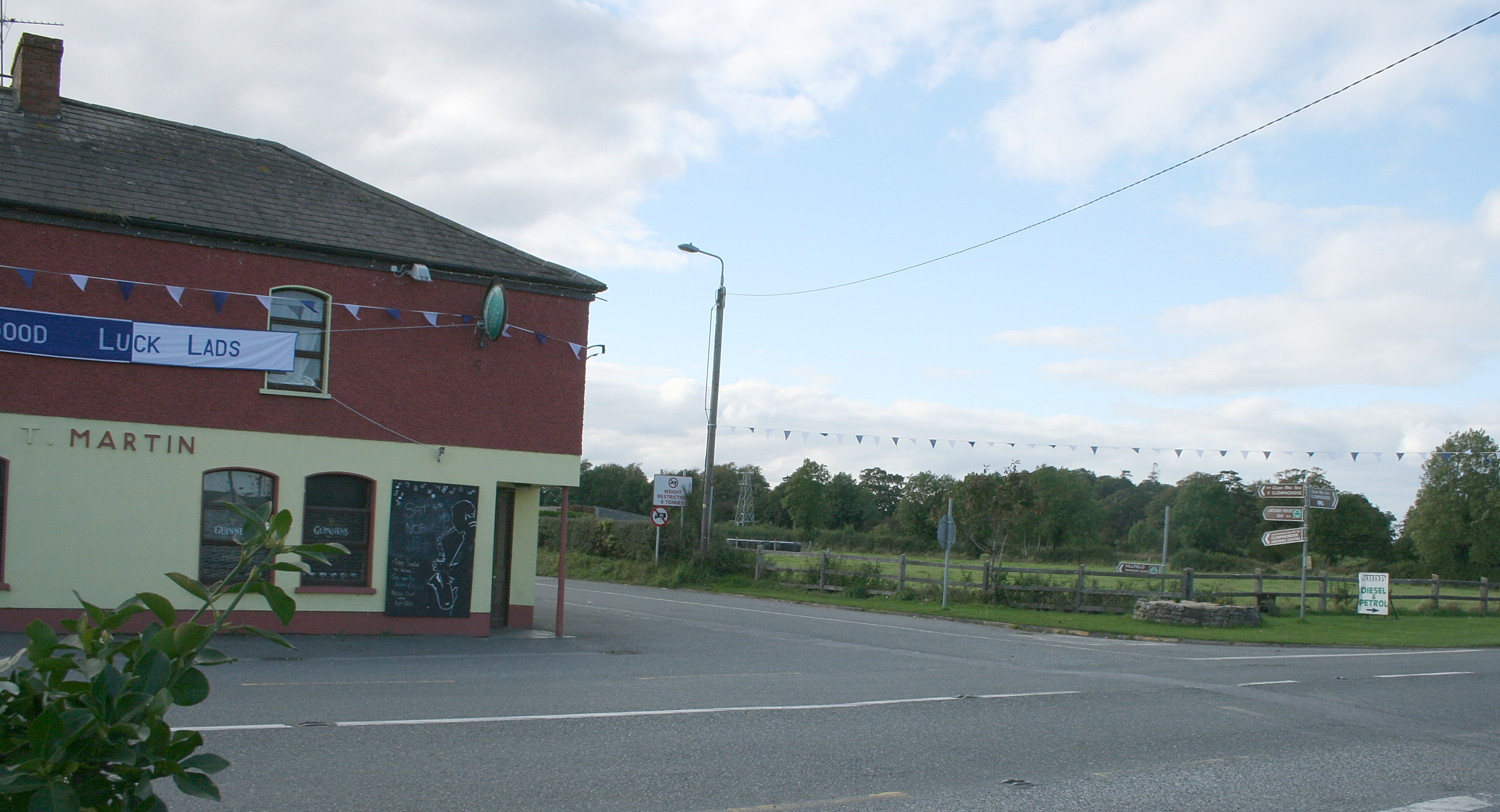
Doon Crossroads

Doon (Irish: An Clochán) is a small village in the north-west corner of County Offaly, Ireland. The Doon landscape is dominated by the ruins of the castle of Esker, which stands on a sandy ridge north of Doon crossroads. A short distance to the east of the crossroads stands the ruin of an ancient building know locally as 'the monastery'. It was the private religious house attached to the castle. The area's (mostly) farming community and catchment are served by Doon's pub (Martins of Doon), the local Gaelic football club (Doon GAA).

== See also ==
- List of towns and villages in Ireland
