= Walsh Island =

Village in County Offaly, Ireland

Walsh Island Inis na mBreatnach (Irish)
- Village
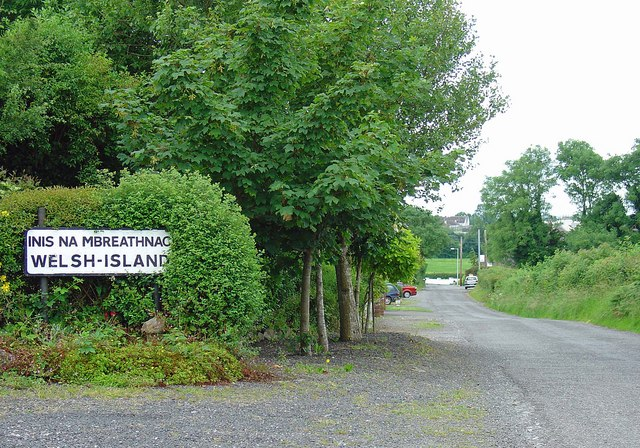
- Entrance to Walsh Island

- Location in Ireland
- Coordinates: 53°13′51″N 7°13′22″W
- Country: Ireland
- Province: Leinster
- County: County Offaly
- Elevation: 89 m (292 ft)

Population (2016)
  - Total: 443
- Time zone: UTC+0 (IST)
  - Summer (DST): UTC-1 (IST (WEST))
- Irish Grid Reference: N518204

Walsh Island or Walshisland (Irish: Inis na mBreatnach) is a village in County Offaly, Ireland. It takes its name from the surrounding hinterland which is a fertile area of land on a hill (104m) located in an area of bogland known as the Bog of Allen, (hence, "island"). The village is one kilometre west of the R400 regional road which runs through the bog below. Walsh Island is 12 km from the nearest town, Portarlington. As of the 2016 census, the village had a population of 443 people.

== Sports ==
Walsh Island GAA club has produced two All-Ireland Senior Football Championship winning captains in Willie Bryan and Richie Connor. Walsh Island's Matt Connor was also selected in 1999 as a member of the GAA Millennium Football team. He was also the subject of a Laochra Gael television programme on TG4. The club's intermediate level team was also featured on the RTÉ programme ParkLive in 2006.

The local soccer team, the Walsh Island Shamrocks, plays its home games at Carty Park. They play in the C.C.F.L League (for teams from Counties Offaly, Laois, Westmeath and Longford).

The village also has a small Gaelic handball alley which was restored by Walsh Island development group and officially opened in August 2015.

== Economy and culture ==
Bogland plays a role in the culture and economy of Walsh Island. Its "island" name is thought to refer to the fact that the village is surrounded by bogs - which may have flooded in centuries gone by, creating an "island". The village has one pub called 'The Hoppers', which is run by the Flint family.

A threshing festival is held in Walsh Island each summer to celebrate the harvest season, called the Hopper's Harvest. It is usually held in August and incorporates a vintage tractor run, traditional cooking, butter making, animal display and a dog show.

The Mountlucas Wind Farm, just outside the village, has a recreational walking route.

Walsh Island is known for the preserved blacksmith's forge in the village centre.

== See also ==
- List of towns and villages in Ireland
