= Texaco Footballer of the Year =

Gaelic football award (1958–2012)

The Texaco Footballer of the Year was a Gaelic football award, created in 1958, that honoured the achievements of a footballer of outstanding excellence. The award was part of the Texaco Sportstars Awards, in which Irish sportspeople from all fields were honoured.

The award was presented annually to the Gaelic footballer considered to have performed the best over the previous year in the Football Championship. Voting for the award was undertaken by a select group of journalists from television and the print media. The award itself, standing 14 inches high, was one of the most sought-after accolades in Irish sport.

This award is distinct from the All Stars Footballer of the Year, awarded by the GAA since 1995, as part of the GAA GPA All Stars Awards. Marc and Tomás Ó Sé of Kerry, and Alan and Bernard Brogan (junior) of Dublin are the only pairs of brothers to have won the award. Jack O'Shea of Kerry has won the award the most times, with four wins.

The award was discontinued in 2012 after Texaco withdrew their sponsorship.

== Recipients ==
Year	Player	County	Club	Notes
2011	Alan Brogan	Dublin	St Oliver Plunketts	Played half forward, succeeded his brother Bernard who won in 2010
2010	Bernard Brogan	Dublin	St Oliver Plunketts	One of only three winners to win, despite their county not winning that year's All-Ireland
2009	Tomás Ó Sé	Kerry	An Ghaeltacht	Played right-half back
2008	Sean Cavanagh	Tyrone	Moy	Played at full forward
2007	Marc Ó Sé	Kerry	An Ghaeltacht	Corner back
2006	Kieran Donaghy	Kerry	Austin Stacks	Full forward
2005	Stephen O'Neill	Tyrone	Clann na nGael	Full forward
2004	Colm Cooper	Kerry	Dr Crokes	Corner forward
2003	Peter Canavan	Tyrone	Errigal Ciarán	Full forward
2002	Kieran McGeeney	Armagh	CLG Na Fianna	
2001	Pádraic Joyce	Galway	Killererin	Full forward
2000	Séamus Moynihan	Kerry	Glenflesk	Centre back
1999	Trevor Giles	Meath	Skryne	Centre forward
1998	Michael Donnellan	Galway	Dunmore McHales	Wing forward
1997	Maurice Fitzgerald	Kerry	St. Mary's Cahirciveen	Corner forward
1996	Martin O'Connell	Meath	St. Michaels	Wing Back
1995	Paul Curran	Dublin	Thomas Davis	Wing Back
1994	Mickey Linden	Down	Mayobridge	Corner forward
1993	Henry Downey	Derry	Lavey	Centre back
1992	Martin McHugh	Donegal	Kilcar	Centre forward
1991	Colm O'Rourke	Meath	Skryne	One of only three winners to win despite their county not winning that year's All-Ireland
1990	Shea Fahy	Cork	Nemo Rangers	
1989	Teddy McCarthy	Cork	Glanmire	
1988	Robbie O'Malley	Meath	St Colmcille's	
1987	Brian Stafford	Meath	Kilmainhamwood	Full forward
1986	Pat Spillane	Kerry	Templenoe	Wing forward, second win
1985	Jack O'Shea	Kerry	St. Mary's Cahirciveen	Midfield, fourth win
1984	Jack O'Shea	Kerry	St. Mary's Cahirciveen	Midfield, third win
1983	Tommy Drumm	Dublin	Whitehall Colmcilles	Centre back
1982	Martin Furlong	Offaly	Tullamore	Goalkeeper
1981	Jack O'Shea	Kerry	St. Mary's Cahirciveen	Midfield, second win
1980	Jack O'Shea	Kerry	St. Mary's Cahirciveen	Midfield
1979	Mikey Sheehy	Kerry	Austin Stacks	Corner forward
1978	Pat Spillane	Kerry	Templenoe	Wing forward
1977	Jimmy Keaveney	Dublin	St Vincents	Full forward, second win
1976	Jimmy Keaveney	Dublin	St Vincents	Full forward, did not win an All-Star
1975	John O'Keeffe	Kerry	Austin Stacks	Full back
1974	Kevin Heffernan	Dublin	St Vincents	The only person to be awarded this award while not a player but a manager
1973	Billy Morgan	Cork	Nemo Rangers	Goalkeeper
1972	Willie Bryan	Offaly	Walsh Island	
1971	Eugene Mulligan	Offaly	Rhode	
1970	Tom Prendergast	Kerry	Keel	
1969	Mick O'Dwyer	Kerry	Waterville	Wing forward
1968	Seán O'Neill	Down	John Mitchel	
1967	Bertie Cunningham	Meath	Ballivor	
1966	Mattie McDonagh	Galway	Ballygar	
1965	Martin L. Newell	Galway	Father Griffins	
1964	Noel Tierney	Galway	Milltown	Full back
1963	Lar Foley	Dublin	St Vincents	
1962	Mick O'Connell	Kerry	Young Islanders	Midfield
1961	James McCartan Snr	Down	Tullylish	Second win
1960	James McCartan Snr	Down	St Patrick's	
1959	Seán Murphy	Kerry	Dingle	
1958	Jim McKeever	Derry	Ballymaguigan	Inaugural winner. One of only three winners to win, despite their county not winning that year's All-Ireland.
