= Matt Connor =

Irish Gaelic footballer

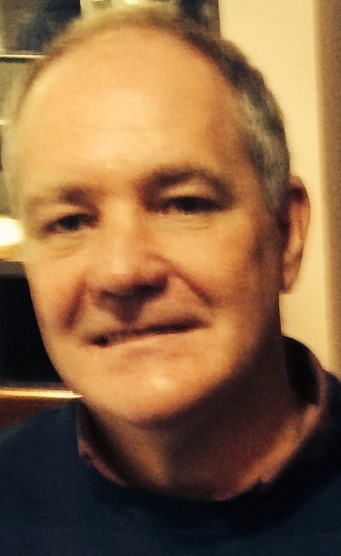

Personal information
- Native name: Maitiú Ó Conchubhair (Irish)
- Born: 1959 (age 66–67) Walsh Island, County Offaly
- Occupation: Garda Síochána

Sport
- Sport: Gaelic football
- Position: Full-forward
Club
- Years: Club
- 1977–1984: Walsh Island
Club titles
- Offaly titles: 6
- Leinster titles: 2
- All-Ireland Titles: 0
Inter-county
| Years | County | Apps (scores) |
| 1978–1984 | Offaly | 26 (13–142) |
Inter-county titles
- Leinster titles: 3
- All-Irelands: 1
- NFL: 0
- All Stars: 3

Matt Connor (born 9 July 1959 in Walsh Island, County Offaly) is an Irish former Gaelic footballer who played for his local club Walsh Island and at senior level for the Offaly county team from 1978 until 1984, when he was seriously injured in a car crash.

Connor's display for Offaly in the 1980 All-Ireland SFC semi-final against Kerry, scoring 2–9, was his signature performance, and is considered one of the best personal performances in the history of Gaelic football.

He was interviewed for the documentary Players of the Faithful.

In May 2020, the Irish Independent named Connor at number six in its "Top 20 footballers in Ireland over the past 50 years".

Armagh captain and BBC GAA commentator Jimmy Smyth considers Connor the finest player he ever saw.

== Honours ==
Walsh Island

- Leinster Senior Club Football Championship (2): 1979, 1980
- Offaly Senior Club Football Championship (6): 1978, 1979, 1980, 1981, 1982, 1983

Offaly

- All-Ireland Senior Football Championship (1): 1982
- Leinster Senior Football Championship (3): 1980, 1981, 1982

Individual

- All Star (3): 1980, 1982, 1983
