= List of All-Ireland Senior Football Championship finals =

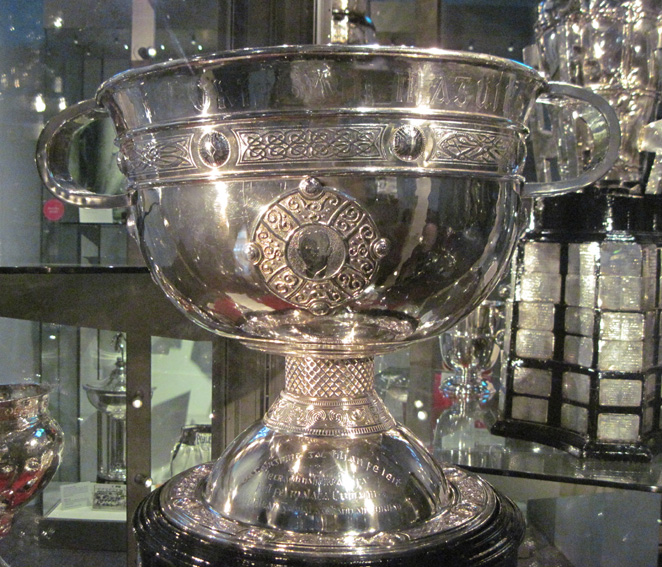
- Founded: 1887
- Region: Ireland (GAA)
- Teams: 34 (qualifiers)
- Most championships: Kerry (39 titles)

The All-Ireland Men's Senior Football Championship, the premier competition in Gaelic football, is an annual series of games played in Ireland during the summer and early autumn, and organised by the Gaelic Athletic Association (GAA). Contested by the top male inter-county football teams in Ireland, the tournament has taken place every year since 1887, except in 1888 when the competition was not played due to a tour of the United States by would-be competitors.

The competition traditionally culminates on the third or fourth Sunday in September with the All-Ireland Men's Senior Football Championship Final. Since 2022 the final game played on the third Sunday of July. The winning team receives the Sam Maguire Cup.

Finals held before the GAA's acquisition of Croke Park in 1913 were played at various venues in Dublin, Cork, Kildare, and Tipperary; since then the final has been played at Croke Park in Dublin, except for the 1947 final which was played at the Polo Grounds in New York.

== History ==
Teams from the southern province of Munster shared the early titles, with Limerick, Tipperary and Cork winning the first three finals. The first Championship featured club teams who represented their respective counties after their county championship. The 21 a-side final, played in Beech Hill, Donnybrook on 29 April 1888, was contested between Commercials of Limerick and Young Irelands of Louth, with Commercials winning by 1–4 to 0–3.

The second Championship was unfinished owing to the American Invasion Tour. The 1888 provincial championships had been completed (won by Tipperary, Kilkenny and Monaghan, with no Connacht teams entering) but after the Invasion Tour ended, the All-Ireland semi-final and final were not played. London reached the final four times in the early years of the competition (1900–03).

The 1903 Championship brought Kerry's first All-Ireland title. They went on to become the most successful football team in the history of the All-Ireland Senior Football Championship. As of 2025, the Kingdom have won the competition on 39 occasions, including two four-in-a-rows (1929–32 and 1978–81) and two three-in-a-rows (1939–41 and 1984–86). Galway were the first team from the western province of Connacht to win an All-Ireland title, in 1925, while Cavan were the first from the northern province of Ulster, in 1933.

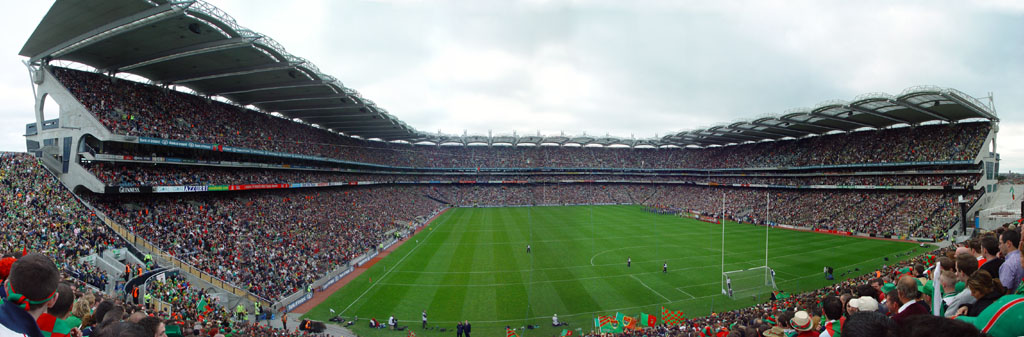
Croke Park kitted out in the green and red of Mayo fans at the 2004 All-Ireland Senior Football Championship final

The first half of the twentieth century brought the rise of several teams who won two or more All-Ireland titles during this period, such as Kildare, Mayo, Cavan, Wexford and Roscommon. Wexford won four consecutive titles between 1915 and 1918, while Kildare were the first winners of the Sam Maguire Cup in 1928. Cavan won five titles between 1933 and 1952, including in 1947 when the final was played in New York. None of these teams have won an All-Ireland title since, with only Kildare, Mayo and Roscommon reaching the final. Most notably, Mayo appeared in eleven finals since winning the title in 1951, losing them all (1989, 1996 after a replay, 1997, 2004, 2006, 2012, 2013, 2016 after a replay, 2017, 2020 and 2021); this is the longest unbroken sequence of losing finals in the history of the competition. The sequence was brought to an end in 2026 when Mayo defeated Kerry by 3 points in the final.

A record 90,556 attended the 1961 final between Down and Offaly. For 13 consecutive finals between 1974 and 1986, either Dublin or Kerry always contested the decider, with both playing against each other in six of them, and Offaly (in 1982) the only other team to win a title in that period. In the 1990s, a significant sea change took place, as the All-Ireland was claimed by an Ulster team in four consecutive years (1991–94). For the next 25 years Ulster produced more All-Ireland winning teams than any other province. The introduction of the qualifier system (commonly known as the "back door") in 2001 enabled Galway to reach and win that year's final despite losing to Roscommon in the Connacht semi-finals; a further six teams have since claimed the All-Ireland after coming through the qualifiers. Between 2011 and 2023 All Ireland champions won their Province. But in 2023 became a round robin system. ({Tyrone in 2005 and 2008, Kerry in 2006 and 2009, Cork in 2010} and Armagh in 2024 under a Round Robin system). The 2003 final between Tyrone and Armagh was the first to be contested by two teams from the same province.

The duration of certain championship matches increased from 60 to 80 minutes during the 1970s. They were settled at 70 minutes after five seasons of this in 1975. This applied only to the provincial finals, All-Ireland semi-finals and finals.

== Finals ==
The following table sets out the winning team and beaten finalist of each All-Ireland Senior Football Championship final. The vast majority of finals were contested by the winning semi-finalists, although in certain cases in the early years a provincial championship had not been completed in time and the affected province nominated a team to participate in the All-Ireland semi-final. In some of these cases, the nominated team (e.g. Dublin in 1905) won its semi-final, but was then vanquished in their provincial championship, and their place in the All-Ireland final taken by another team from that province.

=== Key ===
Key to list of winners
	Final won after Replay
†	Final not played
‡	Winning county won the Double (Senior Football and Hurling Championship)

All teams are based in Ireland, except for London and New York.

=== Results ===
Year	Date	Winners		Runners-up		Venue	Attendance	
Year	Date	County (titles)	Score	County	Score	Venue	Attendance	Winning margin^{[A]} (points) |
1887	29 April 1888	Limerick (1)	1–04	Louth	0–03	Donnybrook	7,000	1 goal, 1 point
1888 †	Championship unfinished — the GAA committee and players travelled to the USA to promote the game abroad							
1889	20 October	Tipperary (1)	3–06	Laois	0–00	Inchicore	1,500	3 goals, 6 points
1890	26 June 1892	Cork ‡ (1)	2–04	Wexford	0–01	Clonturk	1,000	2 goals, 3 points
1891	28 February 1892	Dublin (1)	2–01	Cork	1–01	Clonturk	2,000	1 goal
1892	26 March 1893	Dublin (2)	1–04	Kerry	0–03	Clonturk	5,000	6
1893	24 June 1894	Wexford (1)	1–01	Cork	0–01	Phoenix Park	1,000	5
1894	21 April 1895	Dublin (3)	0–05	Cork	1–02	Thurles	10,000	–^{[B]}
1895	15 March 1896	Tipperary ‡ (2)	0–04	Meath	0–03	Jones' Road	8,000	1
1896	6 February 1898	Limerick (2)	1–05 (8)	Dublin	0–07	Jones' Road	3,500	1
1897	5 February 1899	Dublin (4)	2–06 (12)	Cork	0–02	Jones' Road	4,000	10
1898	8 April 1900	Dublin (5)	2–08 (14)	Waterford	0–04	Tipperary	1,000	10
1899	10 February 1901	Dublin (6)	1–10 (13)	Cork	0–06	Jones' Road	2,000	7
1900	26 October 1902	Tipperary ‡ (3)	3–07 (16)	London	0–02	Jones' Road	2,000	14
1901	2 August 1903	Dublin (7)	0–14	London	0–02	Jones' Road	2,000	12
1902	11 September 1904	Dublin (8)	2–8 (14)	London	0–04	Cork	10,000	10
1903	12 November 1905	Kerry (1)	0–11	London	0–03	Jones' Road	10,000	8
1904	1 July 1906	Kerry (2)	0–05	Dublin	0–02	Cork	10,000	3
1905	16 June 1906	Kildare (1)	1–07 (10)	Kerry	0–05	Thurles	15,000	5
1906	20 October 1907	Dublin (9)	0–05	Cork	0–04	Geraldine Park, Athy	8,000	1
1907	5 July 1908	Dublin (10)	0–06	Cork	0–02	Tipperary	5,000	4
1908	3 October 1909	Dublin (11)	1–10 (13)	London	0–04	Jones' Road	10,000	9
1909	5 December	Kerry (3)	1–09 (12)	Louth	0–06	Jones' Road	16,000	6
1910 †	13 November	Louth (1)	W/O	Kerry	Scratch^{[C]}	Jones' Road		
1911	14 January 1912	Cork (2)	6–06 (24)	Antrim	1–02 (5)	Jones' Road	11,000	19
1912	3 November	Louth (2)	1–07 (10)	Antrim	1–02 (5)	Jones' Road	13,000	5
1913	14 December	Kerry (4)	2–02 (8)	Wexford	0–03	Croke Park	17,000	5
1914	29 November	Kerry (5)	2–03 (9)	Wexford	0–06	Croke Park	20,000	3
1915	7 November	Wexford (2)	2–04 (10)	Kerry	2–01 (7)	Croke Park	27,000	3
1916	17 December	Wexford (3)	3–04 (13)	Mayo	1–02 (5)	Croke Park	3,000	8
1917	9 December	Wexford (4)	0–09	Clare	0–05	Croke Park	6,500	4
1918	16 February 1919	Wexford (5)	0–05	Tipperary	0–04	Croke Park	12,000	1
1919	28 September	Kildare (2)	2–05 (11)	Galway	0–01	Croke Park	32,000	10
1920	11 June 1922	Tipperary (4)	1–06 (9)	Dublin	1–02 (5)	Croke Park	17,000	4
1921	17 June 1923	Dublin (12)	1–09 (12)	Mayo	0–02	Croke Park	16,000	10
1922	7 October 1923	Dublin (13)	0–06	Galway	0–04	Croke Park	11,792	2
1923	28 September 1924	Dublin (14)	1–05 (8)	Kerry	1–03 (6)	Croke Park	18,500	2
1924	16 April 1925	Kerry (6)	0–04	Dublin	0–03	Croke Park	28,844	1
1925 †	10 January 1926	Galway (1)	3–02 (11)	Cavan^{[D]}	1–02 (5)	Croke Park		6
1926	17 October	Kerry (7)	1–4 (7)	Kildare	0–4	Croke Park	35,500	3
1927	25 September	Kildare (3)	0–05	Kerry	0–03	Croke Park	36,529	2
1928	30 September	Kildare (4)	2–06 (12)	Cavan	2–05 (11)	Croke Park	24,700	1
1929	22 September	Kerry (8)	1–08 (11)	Kildare	1–05 (8)	Croke Park	43,839	3
1930	28 September	Kerry (9)	3–11 (20)	Monaghan	0–02	Croke Park	33,280	18
1931	27 September	Kerry (10)	1–11 (14)	Kildare	0–08	Croke Park	42,350	6
1932	25 September	Kerry (11)	2–07 (13)	Mayo	2–04 (10)	Croke Park	25,816	3
1933	24 September	Cavan (1)	2–05 (11)	Galway	1–04 (7)	Croke Park	45,188	4
1934	23 September	Galway (2)	3–05 (14)	Dublin	1–09 (12)	Croke Park	36,143	2
1935	22 September	Cavan (2)	3–06 (15)	Kildare	2–05 (11)	Croke Park	50,380	4
1936	27 September	Mayo (1)	4–11 (23)	Laois	0–05	Croke Park	50,168	18
1937	17 October	Kerry (12)	4–04 (16)	Cavan	1–07 (10)	Croke Park	51,234	6
1938	23 October	Galway (3)	2–4 (10)	Kerry	0–7	Croke Park	47,851	3
1939	24 September	Kerry (13)	2–05 (11)	Meath	2–03 (9)	Croke Park	46,828	2
1940	22 September	Kerry (14)	0–07	Galway	1–03 (6)	Croke Park	60,821	1
1941	7 September	Kerry (15)	1–08 (11)	Galway	0–07	Croke Park	45,512	4
1942	20 September	Dublin (15)	1–10 (13)	Galway	1–08 (11)	Croke Park	37,105	2
1943	10 October	Roscommon (1)	2–07 (13)	Cavan	2–02 (8)	Croke Park	47,193	5
1944	24 September	Roscommon (2)	1–09 (12)	Kerry	2–04 (10)	Croke Park	79,245	2
1945	23 September	Cork (3)	2–05 (11)	Cavan	0–07	Croke Park	67,329	4
1946	27 October	Kerry (16)	2–08 (14)	Roscommon	0–10	Croke Park	65,661	4
1947	14 September	Cavan (3)	2–11 (17)	Kerry	2–07 (13)	Polo Grounds, New York	34,491	4
1948	26 September	Cavan (4)	4–05 (17)	Mayo	4–04 (16)	Croke Park	74,645	1
1949	25 September	Meath (1)	1–10 (13)	Cavan	1–06 (9)	Croke Park	79,460	4
1950	24 September	Mayo (2)	2–05 (11)	Louth	1–06 (9)	Croke Park	76,174	2
1951	23 September	Mayo (3)	2–08 (14)	Meath	0–09	Croke Park	78,201	5
1952	12 October	Cavan (5)	0–09	Meath	0–05	Croke Park	62,515	4
1953	27 September	Kerry (17)	0–13	Armagh	1–06 (9)	Croke Park	86,155	4
1954	26 September	Meath (2)	1–13 (16)	Kerry	1–07 (10)	Croke Park	75,276	6
1955	25 September	Kerry (18)	0–12	Dublin	1–06 (9)	Croke Park	87,102	3
1956	7 October	Galway (4)	2–13 (19)	Cork	3–07 (16)	Croke Park	70,772	3
1957	22 September	Louth (3)	1–09 (12)	Cork	1–07 (10)	Croke Park	72,732	2
1958	28 September	Dublin (16)	2–12 (18)	Derry	1–09 (12)	Croke Park	73,371	6
1959	27 September	Kerry (19)	3–07 (16)	Galway	1–04 (7)	Croke Park	85,897	9
1960	25 September	Down (1)	2–10 (16)	Kerry	0–08	Croke Park	87,768	8
1961	24 September	Down (2)	3–06 (15)	Offaly	2–08 (14)	Croke Park	90,556	1
1962	23 September	Kerry (20)	1–12 (15)	Roscommon	1–06 (9)	Croke Park	75,771	6
1963	22 September	Dublin (17)	1–09 (12)	Galway	0–10	Croke Park	87,106	2
1964	27 September	Galway (5)	0–15	Kerry	0–10	Croke Park	76,498	5
1965	26 September	Galway (6)	0–12	Kerry	0–09	Croke Park	77,735	3
1966	25 September	Galway (7)	1–10 (13)	Meath	0–07	Croke Park	71,569	6
1967	24 September	Meath (3)	1–09 (12)	Cork	0–09	Croke Park	70,343	3
1968	22 September	Down (3)	2–12 (18)	Kerry	1–13 (16)	Croke Park	71,294	2
1969	28 September	Kerry (21)	0–10	Offaly	0–07	Croke Park	67,828	3
1970	27 September	Kerry (22)	2–19 (25)	Meath	0–18	Croke Park	71,775	7
1971	26 September	Offaly (1)	1–14 (17)	Galway	2–08 (14)	Croke Park	70,789	3
1972	15 October	Offaly (2)	1–19 (22)	Kerry	0–13	Croke Park	66,136	9
1973	23 September	Cork (4)	3–17 (26)	Galway	2–13 (19)	Croke Park	73,308	7
1974	22 September	Dublin (18)	0–14	Galway	1–06 (9)	Croke Park	71,898	5
1975	28 September	Kerry (23)	2–12 (18)	Dublin	0–11	Croke Park	66,346	7
1976	26 September	Dublin (19)	3–08 (17)	Kerry	0–10	Croke Park	73,588	7
1977	25 September	Dublin (20)	5–12 (27)	Armagh	3–06 (15)	Croke Park	66,542	12
1978	24 September	Kerry (24)	5–11 (26)	Dublin	0–09	Croke Park	71,503	17
1979	16 September	Kerry (25)	3–13 (22)	Dublin	1–08 (11)	Croke Park	72,185	11
1980	21 September	Kerry (26)	1–09 (12)	Roscommon	1–06 (9)	Croke Park	63,854	3
1981	20 September	Kerry (27)	1–12 (15)	Offaly	0–08	Croke Park	61,489	7
1982	16 September	Offaly (3)	1–15 (18)	Kerry	0–17	Croke Park	62,309	1
1983	18 September	Dublin (21)	1–10 (13)	Galway	1–08 (11)	Croke Park	71,988	2
1984	23 September	Kerry (28)	0–14	Dublin	1–06 (9)	Croke Park	68,365	5
1985	22 September	Kerry (29)	2–12 (18)	Dublin	2–08 (14)	Croke Park	69,389	4
1986	21 September	Kerry (30)	2–15 (21)	Tyrone	1–10 (13)	Croke Park	68,628	8
1987	20 September	Meath (4)	1–14 (17)	Cork	0–11	Croke Park	68,431	6
1988	9 October	Meath (5)	0–13	Cork	0–12	Croke Park	64,069	1
1989	17 September	Cork (5)	0–17	Mayo	1–11 (14)	Croke Park	65,519	3
1990	16 September	Cork ‡ (6)	0–11	Meath	0–09	Croke Park	65,723	2
1991	15 September	Down (4)	1–16 (19)	Meath	1–14 (17)	Croke Park	64,500	2
1992	20 September	Donegal (1)	0–18	Dublin	0–14	Croke Park	64,547	4
1993	19 September	Derry (1)	1–14 (17)	Cork	2–08 (14)	Croke Park	64,500	3
1994	18 September	Down (5)	1–12 (15)	Dublin	0–13	Croke Park	58,684	2
1995	17 September	Dublin (22)	1–10 (13)	Tyrone	0–12	Croke Park	65,000	1
1996	29 September	Meath (6)	2–09 (15)	Mayo	1–11 (14)	Croke Park	65,802	1
1997	28 September	Kerry (31)	0–13	Mayo	1–07 (10)	Croke Park	65,601	3
1998	27 September	Galway (8)	1–14 (17)	Kildare	1–10 (13)	Croke Park	65,886	4
1999	26 September	Meath (7)	1–11 (14)	Cork	1–08 (11)	Croke Park	63,276	3
2000	7 October	Kerry (32)	0–17	Galway	1–10 (13)	Croke Park	64,094	4
2001	23 September	Galway (9)	0–17	Meath	0–08	Croke Park	70,842	9
2002	22 September	Armagh (1)	1–12 (15)	Kerry	0–14	Croke Park	79,500	1
2003	28 September	Tyrone (1)	0–12	Armagh	0–09	Croke Park	79,394	3
2004	26 September	Kerry (33)	1–20 (23)	Mayo	2–09 (15)	Croke Park	79,749	8
2005	25 September	Tyrone (2)	1–16 (19)	Kerry	2–10 (16)	Croke Park	82,112	3
2006	17 September	Kerry (34)	4–15 (27)	Mayo	3–05 (14)	Croke Park	82,289	13
2007	16 September	Kerry (35)	3–13 (22)	Cork	1–09 (12)	Croke Park	82,126	10
2008	21 September	Tyrone (3)	1–15 (18)	Kerry	0–14	Croke Park	82,204	4
2009	20 September	Kerry (36)	0–16	Cork	1–09 (12)	Croke Park	82,246	4
2010	19 September	Cork (7)	0–16	Down	0–15	Croke Park	81,604	1
2011	18 September	Dublin (23)	1–12 (15)	Kerry	1–11 (14)	Croke Park	82,300	1
2012	23 September	Donegal (2)	2–11 (17)	Mayo	0–13	Croke Park	82,269	4
2013	22 September	Dublin (24)	2–12 (18)	Mayo	1–14 (17)	Croke Park	82,274	1
2014	21 September	Kerry (37)	2–09 (15)	Donegal	0–12	Croke Park	82,184	3
2015	20 September	Dublin (25)	0–12	Kerry	0–09	Croke Park	82,243	3
2016	1 October	Dublin (26)	1–15 (18)	Mayo	1–14 (17)	Croke Park	82,249	1
2017	17 September	Dublin (27)	1–17 (20)	Mayo	1–16 (19)	Croke Park	82,243	1
2018	2 September	Dublin (28)	2–17 (23)	Tyrone	1–14 (17)	Croke Park	82,300	6
2019	14 September	Dublin (29)	1–18 (21)	Kerry	0–15	Croke Park	82,300	6
2020	19 December	Dublin (30)	2–14 (20)	Mayo	0–15	Croke Park	0^{[E]}	5
2021	11 September	Tyrone (4)	2–14 (20)	Mayo	0–15	Croke Park	41,150^{[F]}	5
2022	24 July	Kerry (38)	0–20	Galway	0–16	Croke Park	82,300	4
2023	30 July	Dublin (31)	1–15 (18)	Kerry	1–13 (16)	Croke Park	82,300	2
2024	28 July	Armagh (2)	1–11 (14)	Galway	0–13	Croke Park	82,164	1
2025	27 July	Kerry (39)	1–26 (29)	Donegal	0–19	Croke Park	82,109	10
2026	26 July	Mayo (4)	1–20 (23)	Kerry	1–17 (20)	Croke Park	82,300	3

^{A} Originally, a goal outweighed any number of points. In 1892, the value of a goal was set at five points; this was reduced to three points in 1896.
^{B} The 1894 replay was abandoned after Dublin walked off following some of their players being assaulted by Cork supporters. Cork led by two points at the time, but Dublin were awarded the championship as Cork were deemed to have been responsible for the abandonment.
^{C} The 1910 Final was scratched and Louth were awarded the championship after Kerry objected to the Great Southern and Western Railway not selling tickets to their fans at reduced rates and refused to travel to Dublin.
^{D} Kerry beat Cavan 1–7 to 2–3 in the semi-final, but after an objection by Cavan and counter-objection by Kerry, both sides were disqualified. Galway were declared champions but, following protests, a substitute competition between the four provincial finalists was organised, with Galway and Cavan proceeding to the final.
^{E} Game was played behind closed doors due to the COVID-19 pandemic in the Republic of Ireland.
^{F} Game was played at 50% capacity due to the COVID-19 pandemic in the Republic of Ireland.

== Results by team ==
Results by team
Team	Wins	First final won	Last final won	Runners-up	Last final lost	Total final appearances
Kerry	39	1903	2025	24	2026	63
Dublin	31	1891	2023	13	1994	44
Galway	9	1925	2001	15	2024	24
Cork	7	1890	2010	16	2009	23
Meath	7	1949	1999	9	2001	16
Cavan	5	1933	1952	6	1949	11
Wexford	5	1893	1918	3	1914	8
Down	5	1960	1994	1	2010	6
Mayo	4	1936	2026	15	2021	19
Kildare	4	1905	1928	5	1998	9
Tipperary	4	1889	1920	1	1918	5
Tyrone	4	2003	2021	3	2018	7
Offaly	3	1971	1982	3	1981	6
Louth	3	1910	1957	3	1950	5
Roscommon	2	1943	1944	3	1980	5
Donegal	2	1992	2012	2	2025	4
Limerick	2	1887	1896	0	–	2
Armagh	2	2002	2024	3	2003	5
Derry	1	1993	1993	1	1958	2
London	0	–		5	1908	5
Antrim	0	–		2	1912	2
Laois	0	–		2	1936	2
Waterford	0	–		1	1898	1
Clare	0	–		1	1917	1
Monaghan	0	–		1	1930	1

== Man of the match ==
- 1990 Shea Fahy
- 1991: James McCartan Jnr
- 1992: Manus Boyle
- 1993: Johnny McGurk
- 1994: Mickey Linden
- 1995: Paul Curran
- 1996 (draw): Liam McHale
- 1996 (replay): Tommy Dowd
- 1997: Maurice Fitzgerald
- 1998: Michael Donnellan
- 1999: Mark O'Reilly
- 2000 (draw): Mike Frank Russell
- 2000 (replay): Seamus Moynihan
- 2001: Pádraic Joyce
- 2002: Oisín McConville
- 2003: Kevin Hughes
- 2004: Colm Cooper
- 2005: Owen Mulligan
- 2006: Aidan O'Mahony
- 2007: Colm Cooper
- 2008: Seán Cavanagh
- 2009: Tom O'Sullivan
- 2010: Daniel Goulding
- 2011: Kevin Nolan
- 2012: Michael Murphy
- 2013: Bernard Brogan Jnr
- 2014: Paul Murphy
- 2015: Brian Fenton
- 2016 (draw): John Small
- 2016 (replay): Mick Fitzsimons
- 2017: James McCarthy
- 2018: Jack McCaffrey
- 2019 (draw): Jack McCaffrey
- 2019 (replay): Ciarán Kilkenny
- 2020: Con O'Callaghan
- 2021: Darren McCurry
- 2022: David Clifford
- 2023: Paul Mannion
- 2024: Oisín Conaty
- 2025: Gavin White
- 2026: Ryan O'Donoghue

== See also ==
- List of All-Ireland Senior Football Championship final goalscorers
- All-Ireland Senior Football Championship Final referees
- List of All-Ireland Senior Hurling Championship finals
- List of National Football League (Ireland) finals
- List of All-Ireland Senior Football Championship semi-finals
