= 1912 All-Ireland Senior Football Championship final =

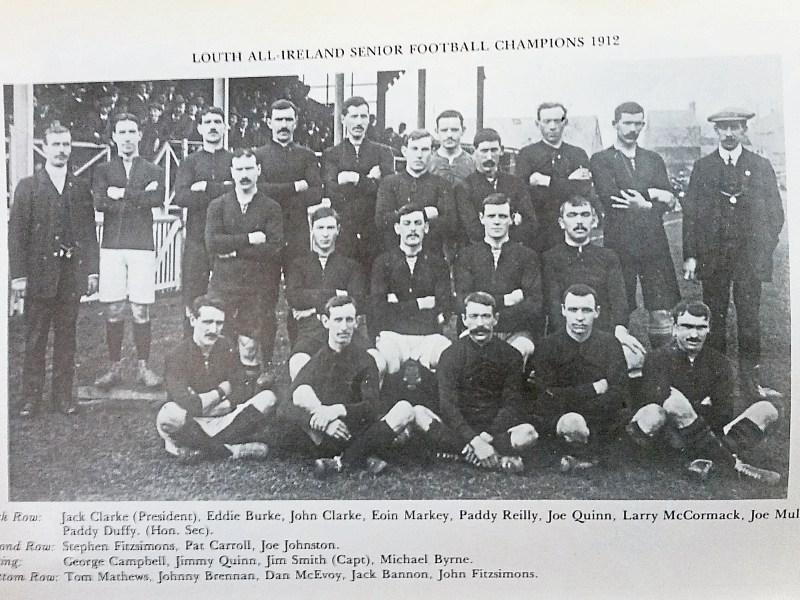
- Louth, champions
- Event: 1912 All-Ireland Senior Football Championship
Louth	Antrim
1–7 (10)	1–2 (5)
- Date: 3 November 1912
- Venue: Jones' Road, Dublin
- Referee: Tom Irwin (Cork)
- Attendance: 20,000

The 1912 All-Ireland Senior Football Championship final was the 25th All-Ireland Final and the deciding match of the 1912 All-Ireland Senior Football Championship, an inter-county Gaelic football tournament for the top teams in Ireland.

The match pitted the Leinster champions Louth against Antrim, the champions of Ulster. Louth were aiming to repeat their 1910 success, while Antrim sought their first All-Ireland SFC title, having lost the previous year's final to Cork.

== Match ==
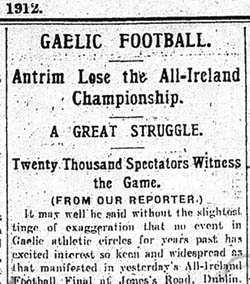
Chronicle of the match

Antrim won the toss, and the game began when Dublin Lord Mayor Lorcan Sherlock threw in the ball.

Louth led 0–2 to 0–1 at half-time. Antrim, who had beaten Kerry in the semi-final, were two points in front during the second half, but Louth came back strongly to win a second All-Ireland SFC title by five points.

Antrim's team included five Louth natives, among them captain John Coburn from Kilcurry. The gate receipts totalled £510, then a record for the Gaelic Athletic Association.

=== Details ===
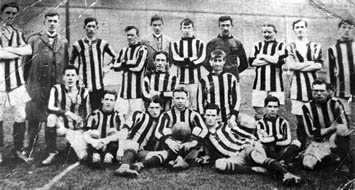
Antrim, runners-up

3 November 1912
2.30pm

Louth	1–7 – 1–2	Antrim
T. Matthews 1–2, J. Brennan 0–2 (1f), J. Bannon, G. Campbell, P. Reilly 0–1 each		J. Mullan 1-0, W. Goggan, E. Gorman 0-1 each

Jones' Road, Dublin
Referee: Tom Irwin (Cork)

Louth
Antrim

1	Michael Byrne (Dundalk Young Irelands) (gk)
2	John Clarke (Tredaghs)
3	John Fitzsimons (Dundalk Young Irelands)
4	Jimmy Quinn (Tredaghs)
5	Joe Mulligan (Dundalk Young Irelands)
6	Jim Smith (Tredaghs) (c)
7	Eddie Burke (Tredaghs)
8	Joe Johnston (Geraldines)
9	Johnny Brennan (Dundalk Rangers)
10	Eoin Markey (Ardee St Mochta's)
11	George Campbell (Ardee St Mochta's)
12	Tom Matthews (Ardee St Mochta's)
13	Stephen Fitzsimons (Dundalk Young Irelands)
14	Dan "Warren" McEvoy (Tredaghs)
15	Jack Bannon (Tredaghs)
16	Larry McCormack (Tredaghs)
17	Paddy Reilly (Tredaghs)
Substitutes:
17	Pat Carroll (Dundalk Young Irelands)
18	Joe Quinn (Tredaghs)
19	Andy Tipping (Dundalk Young Irelands)

1	J. Monaghan (Vintners) (gk)
2	Peter Moylan (Ollamh Fodhla)
3	Tom Meaney (Cúchulainns)
4	John Coburn (Sarsfields) (c)
5	Harry Sheehan (Shane O'Neill's)
6	P. L. Kelly (Ollamh Fodhla)
7	William Manning (John Mitchels)
8	James Murphy (Shane O'Neill's)
9	Willie Goggan (Sarsfields)
10	Louis Waters (Ollamh Fodhla)
11	J. Mulvihill (Shane O'Neill's)
12	Edward Ward (Sarsfields)
13	Joseph Mullan (John Mitchels)
14	Eddie Gorman (John Mitchels)
15	Patrick Barnes (Shane O'Neill's)
16	Joe Gallagher (Clonard Harps)
17	Matt Maguire (Sarsfields)
