= 1906 All-Ireland Senior Football Championship final =

- Event: 1906 All-Ireland Senior Football Championship
Dublin	Cork
0–5	0–4
- Date: 20 October 1907
- Venue: Geraldine Park, Athy
- Referee: John Fitzgerald (Kildare)
- Attendance: 8,000

The 1906 All-Ireland Senior Football Championship final was the nineteenth All-Ireland Final and the deciding match of the 1906 All-Ireland Senior Football Championship, an inter-county Gaelic football tournament for the top teams in Ireland. Kickhams represented Dublin whilst Fermoy represented Cork.

== Match ==
=== Summary ===
Dublin trailed 0–3 to 0–2 at half-time, but came back to win.

It was the third of five All-Ireland SFC titles won by Dublin in the 1900s.

=== Details ===
==== Dublin ====
- Jack Grace (c)
- Dave Brady
- Jack Dempsey
- Dave Kelleher
- Jim Brennan
- Mick Kelly
- Mick Keane
- Mick Curry
- Mick Barry
- P. O'Callaghan
- Paddy Casey
- Hugh Hilliard
- Mick Madigan
- Tom Quane
- Tommy Walsh
- Pierce Grace
- Larry Sheehan

==== Cork ====
- Martin Conners (c)
- Peter Daly
- Peter Linehan
- Charlie Paye
- Jack Kent
- Roy O'Sullivan
- Billy Mackesy
- Mick Mehigan
- Mick Twomey
- Tom Breen
- Tim O'Donoghue
- Jack McCarthy
- Jack Morrissey
- Con McCarthy
- Jim Murphy
- Frank Searles
- Dick Flavin
