= 1890 All-Ireland Senior Football Championship final =

- Event: 1890 All-Ireland Senior Football Championship
Cork	Wexford
2–4 (10)	0–1 (1)
- Date: 26 June 1892
- Venue: Clonturk Park, Dublin
- Referee: J. J. Kenny (Dublin)
- Attendance: 1,000

The 1890 All-Ireland Senior Football Championship final was a Gaelic football match played at Clonturk Park on 26 June 1892 to determine the winners of the 1890 All-Ireland Senior Football Championship, the 4th season of the All-Ireland Senior Football Championship, a tournament organised by the Gaelic Athletic Association for the champions of the four provinces of Ireland. The final was contested by Cork of Munster who were represented by Midleton and Wexford of Leinster who were represented by Blue and Whites, with Cork winning by 2–4 to 0–1.

== Match ==
=== Summary ===
The All-Ireland SFC final had originally been fixed for 17 November 1890; however, the surprise arrival of Ulster SFC winner Armagh necessitated a semi-final, which Cork won. The final was then postponed for nineteen months, only being arranged on the Monday before the refixed date. Wexford were hampered from the beginning as they were short four of their regular team. After missing a great goal chance, the Wexfordmen were in arrears by 1–3 to 0–1 at the interval.

The second half was a stop-start affair. 13 minutes of play were followed by an 8-minute stoppage as one of the teams couldn't locate a substitute for an injured player. 3 more minutes of play followed before a 7-minute stoppage due to an injury to a Cork player. Shortly after Wexford scored a goal, before bagging a second moments later to level the game. A proposed replay was cancelled due to a fair being held in Midleton and Cork were declared the champions on a score line of 2–4 to 0–1.

This was Cork's first All-Ireland SFC title. As All-Ireland champions in hurling also, Cork became the first county to achieve the double.

=== Details ===
26 June 1892

Cork	2–4 – 0–1	Wexford

Clonturk Park, Dublin
Attendance: 1,000
Referee: J. J. Kenny (Dublin)

==== Cork ====
- Jim Power (c)
- Patrick Moore
- Jeremiah Leahy
- Richard Kelleher
- Mick Coleman
- Tom Lucey
- Jack Fitzgerald
- Joe Fitzgerald
- Ted Downey
- Matt O'Riordan
- Dick Power
- J. D. O'Brien
- Michael Hennessy
- William Hennessy
- Michael Egan
- John Aherne
- M. Murphy
- Mick Buckley
- W. Buckley
- Jack Downey
- P. O'Sullivan
- William Kennedy
- William Colbert
- Mick Roche
- Michael Moore
- John Kennedy
