= Kerry–Tipperary Gaelic football rivalry =

Gaelic football rivalry

Kerry-Tipperary
- Location: County Kerry; County Tipperary
- Teams: Kerry; Tipperary
- First meeting: Kerry 0-4 - 0-2 Tipperary; 1894 Munster semi-final (19 August 1894)
- Latest meeting: Kerry 0-25 - 0-5 Tipperary; 2023 Munster semi-final (22 April 2023)

Statistics
- Total meetings: 69
- Most wins: Kerry (59)
- All-time series: Kerry 58-4-5 Tipperary

The Kerry-Tipperary rivalry is a Gaelic football rivalry between Irish county teams Kerry and Tipperary, who first played each other in 1894. It is a rivalry that has existed since the very early provincial championships, however, Kerry have dominated throughout. Kerry's home ground is Fitzgerald Stadium and Tipperary's home ground is Semple Stadium.

While Kerry are the standard bearers in Munster and Tipperary are ranked in third position on the roll of honour, they have also enjoyed success in the All-Ireland Senior Football Championship, having won 41 championship titles between them to date.

== Statistics ==
Up to date as of 2023 Munster Final

Team	All-Ireland	Munster	National League	Total
Kerry	38	84	23	128
Tipperary	4	10	0	13
Combined	42	94	23	159

== All-time results ==
=== Legend ===
Kerry win
Tipperary win
Match was a draw

=== Senior ===
No.	Date	Winners	Score	Runners-up	Venue	Stage
1.	19 August 1894	Kerry	0-4 - 0-2	Tipperary	Cork Park	Munster semi-final
2.	30 September 1894	Tippearary	w.o -	Kerry	Mallow Town Park	Munster semi-final Replay
3.	11 May 1902	Tippearary	1-13 - 1-2	Kerry	Markets Field	Munster final
4.	4 October 1903	Tipperary	1-4 - 1-4	Kerry	Turner's Cross	Munster final
5.	1 November 1903	Tipperary	1-6 - 1-4	Kerry	Turner's Cross	Munster final Replay
6.	27 August 1905	Kerry	5-8 - 1-4	Tipperary	Cork Athletic Grounds	Munster quarter-final
7.	21 July 1907	Kerry	0-7 - 1-3	Tipperary	Markets Field	Munster semi-final
8.	4 July 1909	Kerry	2-10 - 0-5	Tipperary	Fermoy	Munster quarter-final
9.	31 August 1913	Kerry	0-2 - 0-2	Tipperary	Cork Athletic Grounds	Munster semi-final
10.	12 October 1913	Kerry	0-5 - 1-0	Tipperary	Fermoy	Munster semi-final Replay
11.	13 September 1914	Kerry	2-2 - 0-2	Tipperary	Fraher Field	Munster semi-final
12.	12 September 1915	Kerry	1-6 - 0-2	Tipperary	Cork Athletic Grounds	Munster semi-final
13.	9 July 1916	Kerry	2-2 - 0-1	Tipperary	Cork Athletic Grounds	Munster quarter-final
14.	22 July 1917	Tipperary	w.o -	Kerry	Charleville	Munster quarter-final
15.	22 September 1918	Tipperary	1-1 - 0-1	Kerry	Cork Athletic Grounds	Munster final
16.	25 May 1919	Kerry	2-4 - 2-3	Tipperary	Cork Athletic Grounds	Munster quarter-final
17.	9 April 1922	Tipperary	2-2 - 0-2	Kerry	Cork Athletic Grounds	Munster final
18.	14 October 1923	Kerry	0-5 - 0-3	Tipperary	Tralee	Munster final
19.	11 May 1924	Kerry	5-3 - 1-5	Tipperary	Clonmel	Munster quarter-final
20.	31 May 1925	Kerry	1-2 - 0-4	Tipperary	Limerick	Munster quarter-final
21.	28 June 1925	Kerry	3-1 - 0-4	Tipperary	Cork Athletic Grounds	Munster quarter-final Replay
22.	25 July 1926	Kerry	0-11 - 1-4	Tipperary	Cork Athletic Grounds	Munster final
23.	14 August 1927	Kerry	2-6 - 1-1	Tipperary	Fraher Field	Munster semi-final
24.	8 July 1928	Tipperary	1-7 - 2-3	Kerry	Tipperary	Munster semi-final
25.	10 August 1930	Kerry	3-4 - 1-2	Tipperary	Tipperary	Munster final
26.	9 August 1931	Kerry	5-8 - 0-2	Tipperary	Tralee	Munster final
27.	7 August 1932	Kerry	3-10 - 1-4	Tipperary	Tralee	Munster final
28.	13 August 1933	Kerry	2-8 - 1-4	Tipperary	Ned Hall Park	Munster final
29.	15 July 1934	Kerry	2-8 - 0-12	Tipperary	Ned Hall Park	Munster semi-final
30.	12 July 1936	Kerry	1-5 - 0-5	Tipperary	Gaelic Grounds	Munster semi-final
31.	11 July 1937	Kerry	2-11 - 0-4	Tipperary	Mitchelstown	Munster semi-final
32.	3 July 1938	Kerry	2-6 - 1-3	Tipperary	Mitchelstown	Munster semi-final
33.	23 July 1939	Kerry	2-11 - 0-4	Tipperary	Ned Hall Park	Munster final
34.	30 June 1940	Kerry	4-8 - 1-5	Tipperary	Cork Athletic Grounds	Munster semi-final
35.	28 June 1942	Kerry	3-6 - 1-5	Tipperary	Tipperary	Munster semi-final
36.	9 July 1944	Kerry	1-6 - 0-5	Tipperary	Gaelic Grounds	Munster final
37.	24 June 1956	Kerry	3-7 - 3-2	Tipperary	Austin Stack Park	Munster semi-final
38.	29 June 1958	Kerry	1-6 - 0-7	Tipperary	Semple Stadium	Munster semi-final
39.	5 July 1959	Kerry	1-15 - 1-2	Tipperary	Fitzgerald Stadium	Munster semi-final
40.	10 July 1960	Kerry	0-11 - 0-3	Tipperary	Ned Hall Park	Munster semi-final
41.	23 June 1963	Kerry	5-10 - 1-6	Tipperary	Frank Sheehy Park	Munster semi-final
42.	28 June 1964	Kerry	1-14 - 1-7	Tipperary	Semple Stadium	Munster semi-final
43.	26 June 1966	Kerry	3-16 - 2-6	Tipperary	Fitzgerald Stadium	Munster Semi-final
44.	23 June 1968	Kerry	3-4 - 1-2	Tipperary	Ned Hall Park	Munster Semi-final
45.	13 June 1971	Kerry	1-14 - 1-7	Tipperary	Fitzgerald Stadium	Munster semi-final
46.	11 June 1972	Kerry	1-12 - 0-9	Tipperary	Ned Hall Park	Munster semi-final
47.	17 June 1973	Kerry	3-11 - 0-5	Tipperary	Austin Stack Park	Munster semi-final
48.	15 June 1975	Kerry	3-13 - 0-9	Tipperary	Ned Hall Park	Munster semi-final
49.	3 July 1977	Kerry	3-14 - 0-9	Tipperary	Austin Stack Park	Munster semi-final
50.	26 June 1983	Kerry	5-16 - 2-5	Tipperary	Ned Hall Park	Munster semi-final
51.	10 June 1984	Kerry	0-23 - 0-6	Tipperary	Austin Stack Park	Munster semi-final
52.	15 June 1986	Kerry	5-9 - 0-13	Tipperary	Ned Hall Park	Munster semi-final
53.	25 June 1995	Kerry	7-12 - 1-13	Tipperary	Austin Stack Park	Munster semi-final
54.	19 May 1996	Kerry	2-15 - 1-7	Tipperary	Ned Hall Park	Munster quarter-final
55.	29 June 1997	Kerry	2-12 - 1-10	Tipperary	Austin Stack Park	Munster semi-final
56.	2 August 1998	Kerry	0-17 - 1-10	Tipperary	Semple Stadium	Munster final
57.	23 May 1999	Kerry	1-11 - 0-8	Tipperary	Austin Stack Park	Munster quarter-final
58.	13 May 2001	Kerry	3-17 - 1-4	Tipperary	Ned Hall Park	Munster quarter-final
59.	15 June 2003	Kerry	0-25 - 1-10	Tipperary	Austin Stack Park	Munster semi-final
60.	29 May 2005	Kerry	2-22 - 0-13	Tippearary	Semple Stadium	Munster quarter-final
61.	11 June 2006	Kerry	0-17 - 1-5	Tippearary	Fitzgerald Stadium	Munster semi-final
62.	16 May 2010	Kerry	2-18 - 2-6	Tippearary	Semple Stadium	Munster quarter-final
63.	22 May 2011	Kerry	2-16 - 0-11	Tippearary	Fitzgerald Stadium	Munster quarter-final
64.	27 May 2012	Kerry	0-16 - 0-10	Tippearary	Semple Stadium	Munster quarter-final
65.	26 May 2013	Kerry	2-19 - 2-8	Tippearary	Fitzgerald Stadium	Munster quarter-final
66.	14 June 2015	Kerry	2-14 - 2-8	Tippearary	Semple Stadium	Munster semi-final
67.	3 July 2016	Kerry	3-17 - 2-10	Tippearary	Fitzgerald Stadium	Munster final
68.	10 July 2021	Kerry	1-19 - 1-8	Tippearary	Semple Stadium	Munster semi-final
69.	22 April 2023	Kerry	0-25 - 0-5	Tippearary	Fitzgerald Stadium	Munster semi-final
