= Séamus Ó Braonáin =

Irish sportsman and high-ranking public servant

Séamus Ó Braonáin (Jimmy Brennan) (1881–1970) was an Irish sportsman and high-ranking public servant, founding father of the women’s team field sport of camogie in 1904 (based on the men's field sport of hurling), third Director General of Radio Éireann 1940-47, and winner of four All-Ireland Senior Football Championship medals with the Dublin county team in 1902, 1906, 1907 and 1908.

== Education ==
He went to school in Ballyouskill, near Ballyragget, County Kilkenny, where his teacher was the father of Pádraig Puirséil, and then came to Dublin to study in St Mary's College, Rathmines, captaining their Senior Cup side. He joined the Craobh Céitinn branch of the Gaelic League in 1902 and became branch secretary.

== Radio ==
He was attached to the department of education until 1936 when he became secretary for the commission of Irish in the Civil Service and deputy director of broadcasting of Radio Éireann and eventually succeeded TJ Kiernan as Acting Director in 1940 and Director of Broadcasting from May 1942, serving until 1947. When he retired Eamonn Andrews wrote:

At least one radio scribe will miss his consideration and his patience. I am wondering if he will now acquire the ability to listen with pleasure and detachment to Raidio Eireann without wondering if an announcer is going to develop convulsions or an artiste suddenly discard his script and talk chattily of things that must not be talked about chattily.”

.

The radio critic of The Irish Press wrote:

All of us who have come into contact with the present director regret his retirement under age regulations and will remember him particularly for the unfailing courtesy he has always shown. His term of office encompassed the difficult days of the Emergency and his competent direction during those crucial years has merited the many tributes he has been paid.

.

== Sport ==
He played hurling and football with Keatings and won four All-Ireland Senior Football Championship medals with Dublin in 1902, 1906, 1907 and 1908, five Leinster medals, two Dublin championships and one Dublin senior league. He was also a club cricketer and a founder member and later captain of Donabate golf club. He was also founder of An Golf-Chumann Gaedhealach in 1940. He was close friends with Bohemians goalkeeper Jack Hehir. He contributed a sports column in Irish to The Sunday Press for many years.

== Army career ==
He joined the Irish Volunteers and served as secretary of the 1916 Veterans Association, Cumann Sean Óglaigh 1916.

== Camogie ==
He refereed the first camogie practice match at the Thatch in Drumcondra. With Máire Ní Chinnéide, Seán Ó Ceallaigh and Tadhg Ó Donnchadha he drew up the first rule of the game which remained largely unchanged until 1999. The major changes were the increase in playing time from the original 40 minutes to 50 minutes in 1934 and 60 minutes in 1989. In 1990 O’Braonain’s original 12-a-s9ide code on a modified hurling playing field was replaced with a 15-a-side code on a full length and width field.

== Personal life ==
He married Brighid ni Diolúin (Bridget Dillon) who played for Keatings in the first camogie practice match at the Thatch in Drumcondra and the first camogie match in Navan in 1904 and lived on 51 Beaumont Road, Drucmondra. They had 8 children – Flann, Grainne, Brendan, Brighid, Marie, Eithne, together with Maire and Nora who pre-deceased them. He died on 3 May 1970.
