= Pierce Grace =

Irish Gaelic footballer and hurler

Personal information
- Native name: Piaras Grás (Irish)
- Born: 7 September 1885 Tullaroan, County Kilkenny, Ireland
- Died: 4 October 1966 (aged 81) Kilkenny, Ireland
- Occupation: Medical doctor

Sport
- Football Position: Forward
- Hurling Position: Forward
Clubs
- Years: Club
- Tullaroan; Kickhams
Club titles
- Kilkenny titles: 4
Inter-county
- Years: County
- 1906-1910 1911-1914: Dublin; Kilkenny
Inter-county titles
	Football	Hurling
Leinster Titles	2	4
All-Ireland Titles	2	3

Pierce Grace (7 September 1885 – 4 October 1966) was an Irish Gaelic footballer and hurler. His championship career as a dual player with the Dublin and Kilkenny senior teams spanned nine seasons from 1906 until 1914.

Born in Tullaroan, County Kilkenny, Grace was one of eleven children born to Nicholas and Kate Grace (née Keoghan). Raised on the family farm, he was educated locally before attending St. Joseph's CBS and St. Kieran's College. Grace subsequently qualified as a medical doctor from University College Dublin and the Royal College of Surgeons.

Grace first played competitive hurling in his early teens with the Tullaroan club. He won four county hurling championship medals with the club between 1899 and 1903. After moving to Dublin, Grace joined the Kickhams club where he played both hurling and Gaelic football. He won back-to-back county football championship medals in 1906 and 1907, while he also won a county hurling championship medal with the club in 1908.

Success at club level allowed Grace join the Dublin senior football team during the 1906 championship. In a brief career with the team he won back-to-back All-Ireland medals in 1906 and 1907. Grace later joined the Kilkenny senior hurling team, winning three successive All-Ireland medals between 1911 and 1913. He also won two Leinster medals as a footballer and four Leinster medals as a hurler.

Grace's brothers, - Jack and Dick - also had All-Ireland success in both codes with Kilkenny and Dublin. Between them, the three Grace brothers won a total of 15 All-Ireland medals.

== Honours ==
Dublin

- All-Ireland Senior Football Championship (2): 1906, 1907
- Leinster Senior Football Championship (2): 1906, 1907
- Leinster Senior Hurling Championship (1): 1908

Kilkenny

- All-Ireland Senior Hurling Championship (3): 1911, 1912, 1913
