= Ted Downey =

Irish Gaelic footballer

Personal information
- Native name: Tadhg Ó Dúnaigh (Irish)
- Nickname: Ted
- Born: 15 February 1874 Midleton, County Cork, Ireland
- Died: 24 September 1942 (aged 68) Kilmainham, Dublin, Ireland
- Occupation: Floorwalker

Sport
- Sport: Gaelic Football
- Position: Forward
Clubs
- Years: Club
- Midleton; Young Irelands; Kickhams
Club titles
- Cork titles: 1
Inter-county
- Years: County
- 1892 1897: Cork; Dublin
Inter-county titles
- Munster titles: 0
- Leinster titles: 1
- All-Irelands: 2

Timothy Downey (15 February 1874 – 24 September 1942) was an Irish Gaelic footballer who played as a forward for club sides Midleton, Young Irelands and Kickhams and was a member of the Cork and Dublin senior football teams throughout the 1890s.

== Career ==
Born near Midleton, County Cork, Downey showed much promise as a Gaelic footballer in his youth and was selected, at the age of 16, to play for Midleton's first team in the 1890 County Championship. It was a successful campaign which yielded his first winners' medal. Downey subsequently lined out in the 1890 All-Ireland final which saw Cork claim the title after a 2–04 to 0–01 defeat of Wexford. A move to Dublin saw him join up with the Young Irelands and, in 1896, he claimed County Championship honours. Downey claimed a second successive Dublin County Championship title in 1897, however, this time it was with the Kickhams club. He ended the season by winning a second ALl-Ireland medal after Dubin's 2–06 to 0–02 defeat of Cork.

== Personal life and death ==
The son of a national school teacher, Downey moved to Dublin about 1895 where he worked as a floorwalker in Arnotts. He died from heart failure on 24 September 1942 at Dr Steevens' Hospital and was buried in Glasnevin Cemetery. In November 2022, the GAA created a memorial to Downey in the cemetery.

== Honours ==
Midleton

- Cork Senior Football Championship: 1890

Young Irelands

- Dublin Senior Football Championship: 1896

Kichams

- Dublin Senior Football Championship: 1897

Cork

- All-Ireland Senior Football Championship: 1890

Dublin

- All-Ireland Senior Football Championship: 1897
- Leinster Senior Football Championship: 1897
