= 1910 All-Ireland Senior Football Championship final =

- Event: 1910 All-Ireland Senior Football Championship
Louth	Kerry
w/o	scr.
- Date: 13 November 1910
- Venue: Jones' Road, Dublin

The 1910 All-Ireland Senior Football Championship final was the 23rd All-Ireland Final and the deciding match of the 1910 All-Ireland Senior Football Championship, an inter-county Gaelic football tournament for the top teams in Ireland.

== Match ==
=== Summary ===
For a second consecutive year, the final pitted the Leinster champions Louth against Kerry, the champions of Munster. Louth, captained by Larry McCormack of Drogheda, was seeking its first All-Ireland SFC title, while Kerry aimed to repeat the success of 1909 and secure a fourth title overall.

However, the eagerly anticipated contest did not take place, as Louth received a walkover due to Kerry's refusal to play, after the Great Southern and Western Railway declined to sell tickets to their supporters at reduced rates.

=== Details ===
The Louth team officially selected to meet Kerry in the All-Ireland final at Jones’s Road on 13 November 1910 was announced the previous day. The selection differed from the team that defeated Dublin in the Leinster final by one change, with Jim Hughes (Young Irelands) replacing the injured Jim McDonnell (Tredaghs).

1	Michael Byrne (Dundalk Young Irelands) (gk)
2	John Clarke (Tredaghs)
3	Joe Donnelly (Geraldines)
4	Jimmy Quinn (Tredaghs)
5	Joe Mulligan (Dundalk Young Irelands)
6	Jim Smith (Tredaghs)
7	Eddie Burke (Tredaghs)
8	Johnny Brennan (Dundalk Rangers)
9	Eoin Markey (Ardee Volunteers)
10	Tom Matthews (Ardee Volunteers)
11	Larry McCormack (Tredaghs) (c)
12	Jack Bannon (Tredaghs)
13	Michael Hand (Tredaghs)
14	Paddy Reilly (Tredaghs)
15	Hughes (Dundalk Young Irelands)
16	Tom Morgan (Tredaghs)
17	Jack Carvin (Tredaghs)
