= Kickhams GAA =

Gaelic sports club in Dublin, Ireland

Kickhams
- Ciceam
- Founded: 1885
- County: Dublin

Senior Club Championships
	All Ireland	Leinster champions	Dublin champions
Football:	0	0	5
Hurling:	0	0	5

CJ Kickhams GAA was a Gaelic Athletic Association club located in Dublin, Ireland. The club was affiliated to the Dublin County Board and fielded teams in both hurling and Gaelic football.

== History ==
CJ Kickhams GAA Club was founded in 1885 and drew from men working in the drapery business in Dublin. The club was named after Charles Joseph Kickham (1828–1882), a Tipperary-born novelist, poet, journalist and prominent member of the Irish Republican Brotherhood. The club had a successful period in both codes at county, provincial and national levels in the early decades of the Gaelic Athletic Association. Kickhams won a total of four Dublin SHC and five Dublin SFC titles in the 36-year period between 1888 and 1924. These titles were subsequently converted into All-Ireland SHC victories in 1889 and 1924, while Kickhams won All-Ireland SFC titles in 1897, 1906 and 1907.

Kickhams also ran inter-firm competitions in both hurling and Gaelic football during the summer months. Dublin-based drapery stores such as Arnotts, Clerys and Guineys took part, with the Kickham Cup being awarded in Gaelic football and the Power Cup being awarded in hurling. These competitions ran from 1896 until the 1970s.

After 70 years in existence, Kickhams faced a major split in 1955 when tension and bitterness developed between club members. The Dublin County Board disbanded the club for a period at one stage, before 201 members left and formed the Na Fianna club. The Kickhams club continued to exist until 1969, when a merger with Ballymun Gaels resulted in the establishment of the Ballymun Kickhams club.

== Honours ==
- All-Ireland Senior Hurling Championship (2): 1889, 1924
- All-Ireland Senior Football Championship (3): 1897, 1906, 1907
- Leinster Senior Hurling Championship (3): 1889, 1908, 1924
- Leinster Senior Football Championship (4): 1897, 1904, 1906, 1907
- Dublin Senior Hurling Championship (5): 1888, 1889, 1890, 1908, 1924
- Dublin Senior Football Championship (5): 1897, 1904, 1905, 1906, 1907

== Notable players ==
- Jack Grace: All-Ireland SFC-winning captain (1906, 1907)
- Nicholas O'Shea: All-Ireland SHC-winning captain (1889)
- Frank Wall: All-Ireland SHC-winning captain (1924)
