= Dick Flavin =

Dick Flavin may refer to:

- Dick Flavin (Gaelic footballer) (born 1978), Irish Gaelic football player
- Dick Flavin (poet) (1936–2022), American poet
