= Gaelic games in County Kildare =

Gaelic games are the traditional Irish sports of Gaelic football, ladies' Gaelic football, hurling, camogie, Gaelic handball and rounders. This article gives an overview of Gaelic games in County Kildare.

== County symbols ==
Kildare traditionally used the county arms featuring oak trees, acorns and a lily; this was replaced by a blue Saint Brigit cross on a green circle in 2005, so that this symbol could be copyrighted. The all-white strip was originally worn by Clane, and when Kildare won the 1905 All-Ireland Senior Football Championship wearing the Clane colours, it was decided to adopt it permanently. Kildare is thus the only county to have only one county colour.

== Gaelic football ==
Gaelic football in County Kildare is overseen by the Kildare County Board of the Gaelic Athletic Association. Kildare senior football team represents the county in the All-Ireland Senior Football Championship.

== Ladies' Gaelic football ==
Ladies' football in County Kildare is overseen by the Kildare County Board of the Ladies' Gaelic Football Association. Kildare senior ladies' football team represents the county in the All-Ireland Junior Ladies' Football Championship.

== Hurling ==
Hurling in County Kildare is overseen by the Kildare County Board of the Gaelic Athletic Association. At present, there are 11 registered hurling clubs in County Kildare. Kildare senior hurling team represents the county in the All-Ireland Senior Hurling Championship.

== Camogie ==
Camogie in County Kildare is overseen by the Kildare County Board of the Camogie Association. Kildare senior camogie team represents the county in the All-Ireland Senior Camogie Championship.

== Gaelic handball ==
Handball in County Kildare is overseen by the Kildare County Board of the Gaelic Athletic Association.

== Rounders ==
Rounders in County Kildare is overseen by the Kildare County Board of the Gaelic Athletic Association.
