= Forfeit (sport) =

Means of cancelling a competition, causing a competitor to lose automatically

In various sports, a forfeit is a method in which a match automatically ends, and the forfeiting team loses.

There are two distinct forms of forfeiture. One occurs when a team is unable (or refuses) to meet the basic standards for playing the game, either before the game begins or as a result of actions that happen during the match. In such a case, the team not forfeiting wins the match. Another is punitive forfeiture, in which a team has been found to have broken the rules of a sanctioning body during a match they have won and must have the results stricken from the record; whether or not the other team receives a win in such a case depends on the rules of that body and/or whether or not they were in compliance with the rules - if neither team was in compliance with the rules and/or the rules do not allow a losing team to be credited for a win in such a manner then the result is either a double forfeit and/or otherwise recorded as a loss for both teams.

== Association football ==
Both teams must have at least seven players at the beginning of the match per the Laws of the Game. When a team has fewer than seven players, the match cannot start or continue. When the number of players in a team falls definitely below seven (e.g. by five players sent off with red cards, or by injured players with no substitutions left, or a combination of both), the match is forfeited. Forfeits are also used as ex post disciplinary sanctions by governing bodies.

A forfeited match is handled differently in various competitions; FIFA Disciplinary Code punishes the team sanctioned with a forfeit with a 3–0 loss, but the result on the pitch is upheld if the goal difference at the end of the match was three or greater so as to ensure the non-forfeiting team is not unfairly disadvantaged in any potential tiebreakers involving goal difference and/or goals scored.

Forfeited games also could be identified with what is known as a "technical score" like +/-, +:-, where a plus sign (+) signifies a win and a minus sign (-) stands for a loss. Traditionally, technical score is implied as 3:0 score, but earlier in history it also used to be understood as 2:0 score. Beside forfeiture, technical score could be applied for disciplinary sanctions on various of administrative matter such as violence on the field, use of ineligible players, or other reasons. Because it is a "cabinet" score, unless specified in season's (league's) regulations or official executive decision of governing sports organization, the technical score does not necessarily have to carry any numerical value.

In penalty shoot-out, if the player does not come in time to take a kick, the player's kick will be forfeited.

== Baseball ==
In rare cases, baseball games are forfeited, usually in the event when a team is no longer able to play.

== Basketball ==
In the basketball rules published by FIBA, a forfeit and a default are two different things.

A team will forfeit if:

- Fifteen minutes after the scheduled starting time, the team is not present or is unable to field five players ready to play.
- Its actions prevent the game from being played.
- It refuses to play after being instructed to do so by the referee.

A forfeit results in loss for the offending team by a score of 20−0, and in tournaments that use the FIBA points system for standings, zero points for the match. Furthermore, in FIBA tournaments that use a two-game home-and-away series (two-legged tie) or a best-of-three playoff format, a team that forfeits a game also loses the series by forfeit.

In FIBA tournaments, a team will default if, at any time during a game, they have fewer than two players ready to play (by reason of players being injured with no subs left, fouling out, or being ejected). In this case, the opponents are awarded with a win, and if they are leading, the score at the time of stoppage will be the final score; if they are not leading, they are awarded a 2−0 win. Furthermore, in FIBA tournaments that use a two-game home-and-away series, a team that defaults in either game automatically loses the series by default.

In tournaments and leagues that use winning percentage or number of wins to rank teams, the difference between a loss by forfeit and a loss by default is insignificant, as both are treated as ordinary losses. However, for those that use the FIBA points system, a default is treated like an ordinary loss (as the team earns one point) while a team that forfeited earns zero points.

It is also detrimental in tiebreaking situations as a defaulting team's worst result is the actual score if they were trailing when the game was stopped, or a 2–0 loss if they were leading, while a forfeit is deemed to be a 0–20 loss, which drags down a team's goal average worse than a 0–2 loss would.

=== NCAA ===
In U.S. NCAA basketball, a referee decides a game is to be forfeited when any of these criteria are satisfied:

- Any player, squad member or bench personnel fails to comply with any technical foul penalty and/or makes a travesty of the game.
- When conditions warrant.
- A team refuses to play after being instructed to do so by an official.

The forfeiting team loses the game 2−0 unless 30 minutes have elapsed on the game clock; in this case, the score at the end of play shall stand. If the team that is behind in the scorebook is to be declared the winning team, that score shall be marked with an asterisk in the official statistics, and it shall be noted that the game was won by forfeit.

In some cases for if a conference game is forfeited, the win/loss is only counted in the conference standings.

In March 2015, a women's basketball game between Southern and Texas Southern was declared a double forfeit by the officials because of a brawl 30 minutes into the game, but the Southwestern Athletic Conference declared Southern, who was leading the game 51-49 when it was abandoned, the winner. It is somewhat unclear if the NCAA recognizes Southern as the winner or if they recognize the game as a double forfeit.

A forfeit is distinct from a declaration of no contest, when outside conditions prevent a team from being able to play. In the event of a no contest declaration, the affected team is not afforded a loss; in the event it is held during a single-elimination tournament, the unaffected team still advances in effectively a walkover but is not awarded a win. A no-contest was declared in a game during the Round of 64 of the 2021 NCAA Division I men's basketball tournament after the Virginia Commonwealth University Rams had several players placed in COVID-19 quarantine, allowing their opponents, the Oregon Ducks, to advance via walkover. On December 5, 2021, the Washington Huskies canceled and forfeited their game against the UCLA Bruins due to COVID-19 issues.

=== NBA ===
The rules of the National Basketball Association do not mention how forfeitures are dealt with, but mention it is a possible sanction on a player or coach who violates the rules on ejections. Also, in the NBA, defaulting is virtually impossible unless injuries or ejections (not being disqualified for having six fouls) bring a team to fewer than five players. Technical fouls are also dealt differently in the NBA. Certain types of administrative fouls (entering a scratched player, delay of game, hanging on the ring, illegal defense, time out violations) are classified as non-unsportsmanlike conduct fouls where a person cannot be ejected where in the FIBA rules, are grounds for ejection.

Rule 3-I-(a) and (b) go into effect when a team is reduced to five players by fouls or injuries. When a team is reduced to five players in a game and one fouls out, the fouling player remains in the game and the player is in a player foul penalty situation. The rule also applies when (after an injury) a player who fouled out of the game previously returns to the game, where re-entering the game after fouling out places the player in the player foul penalty for re-entering the game. One free throw is awarded, regardless of offensive or defensive foul or re-entry caused by injury. Each such re-entry results in the player foul penalty.

During the playoffs in the 2020 NBA Bubble, the Milwaukee Bucks refused to take the floor before the scheduled start of the fifth game in their series against the Orlando Magic, and were prepared to accept a forfeit in that game as a show of solidarity with Jacob Blake, a Black man who had been shot by police in Kenosha, Wisconsin near the team's home city. However, once the Magic became aware of the Bucks' intent, they left the court themselves rather than agreeing to the forfeit victory, which led to all NBA games over the following three days being postponed.

== Ice hockey ==
=== NHL ===
Under National Hockey League rules, a team forfeits a game when they fail to comply with the rules to an extent that the Referee or the Commissioner of the league (or his designee) refuses to allow the game to continue because of that team's actions. If the game is forfeited prior to the start of the game, the result will be a 1-0 victory to the non-offending team, but no players will be credited with any personal statistics.

If the game was in progress at the time it is declared forfeited, the score shall be recorded as zero for the loser and 1, or the number of goals scored, to the winning team. All players will be credited with any personal statistics earned until the game was forfeited.

=== IIHF ===
Under IIHF rules, a team will forfeit the game if:

- They refuse to begin play with the prescribed number of players on ice.
- They cannot place the required number of players on the ice during the course of a game, because of penalties and injuries.
- They decline to participate in the penalty-shot shootout.
- They repeatedly refuse to start play after being ordered to do so by the referee.

There is no rule pertaining to the procedure as to how a forfeited game is to be scored.

Probably the best known example of an incomplete IIHF-sanctioned game was the Punch-up in Piestany, an infamous bench-clearing brawl between Canada and the Soviet Union at the 1987 World Junior Ice Hockey Championships. In that case, the IIHF judged both teams equally at fault, and declared the game null and void (as opposed to either or both teams forfeiting the game). The IIHF also ejected both teams from the competition, denying Canada a medal which it had seemingly earned regardless of the result of the game.

== Chess ==
As well as checkmate, chess games can be resigned or lost on time, but the term "forfeit" generally has a narrower meaning in the game.

A forfeit occurs when a player does not appear at the match, and is generally a rare occurrence. A notable instance of forfeiture happened in the second game of the 1972 World Chess Championship. Bobby Fischer, due to disputes over the organisation of the match, refused to show, and the game was recorded as a win for his opponent Boris Spassky.

Anatoly Karpov won the 1975 World Championship on forfeit after Bobby Fischer refused to play.

Additionally, a player caught cheating will lose by forfeit.

If two players both failed to show up, the arbitrator will declare a double forfeit, which means both players neither win nor draw the match.

== Cricket ==
In the sport of cricket a forfeiture occurs when a captain chooses to forfeit one of his side's innings. If a team forfeits the entire match, then the umpires will award the match to the other team.

== Gaelic games ==
In the Gaelic games of hurling, Gaelic football, camogie and ladies' Gaelic football, a forfeit is called a walkover (Irish: bua gan choimhlint). The team that concedes a game in a competition may receive punishment(s) such as a fine, deduction of league points, automatic relegation or elimination from a competition.

The most famous walkover in GAA history came in the 1910 All-Ireland Senior Football Championship Final: Louth were awarded the championship after Kerry objected to the Great Southern and Western Railway not granting their fans, players and officials discounted fares and refused to travel to Dublin.

== Gridiron football ==
In American football, a team must begin with at least seven players (the number legally required to man a line of scrimmage) ready to play; a forfeiture occurs if a team does not have that many. It can also occur when the number of able players drops to below seven at any point during the game, as a result of an unfair act, or punitive retroactive sanctions against a team from a governing body such as the NCAA.

In the event the team forfeiting the game is already losing at the time of the forfeit, the score at the time stands as is. Otherwise, forfeits result in a 2–0 score in the National Football League or a 1–0 score in high school football, NCAA and Canadian football.

In the case of high school and the NCAA, the forfeit is one of only two ways for a team to finish with a score of only one point (the other theoretical possibility is if a team's only score comes from a defensive safety, i.e. a botched conversion attempt that results in its opponent getting backed all the way back into its own end zone).

The National Football League rulebook has a provision for forfeiture but has never used it (there was at least one alleged "forfeit" in 1921, but because league schedules were so fluid in the 1920s and it was never clear who was at fault for the game not being played, the league now considers it a cancellation, which was very common at the time). Former NFL commissioner Pete Rozelle noted that he had never used the league's forfeit provisions and would never change the result of a game after the fact, a stance that prevented the result of the Snowplow Game, a game that had been decided on an alleged but unpunished unfair act, from being forfeited. It was briefly discussed after a botched call in the 2018 NFC Championship Game, but interfering with the results of a game after it has finished would cause logistical chaos and massive expense in having to reschedule games, especially in the playoffs.

The NFL threatened forfeiture during the 2020 season if coronavirus-related protocols were not adhered to. No games were forfeited in 2020, but NFL Commissioner Roger Goodell warned teams on July 22, 2021 in a memo that if games had been cancelled during the season due to COVID-19 outbreaks among unvaccinated players, the team responsible for the outbreak would forfeit and would cover financial losses, because teams do not get paid for games not played. NFL policy states that the winning team is not paid its weekly salary if its opponent forfeits the game.

The Canadian Football League's early history with respect to forfeiture is more complicated because the professional Canadian game only gradually diverged from university and other amateur competitions, a process which culminated in the founding of the CFL in 1958. Forfeits were somewhat common up until the early years of the modern CFL for a number of reasons. Sometimes, a team would refuse to travel to play a game because its cut of the gate (the primary source of revenue in those days) would not cover the expenses of the journey. Playoff implications of the game were another factor - unlike in the U.S., conference playoffs in Canadian football were two game playoffs or even best of three series, so teams sometimes preferred a loss at the end of the season, especially if it would not affect their playoff fortunes, in order to gain extra rest for a grueling playoff run. Finally, as the Eastern and Western Conferences gradually turned fully professional teams sometimes forfeited games after fielding ineligible players. The "ineligible" players were typically Americans playing in violation of strict rules limiting their use in Canadian football.

For the 2021 season the CFL (which did not play in 2020 due to the pandemic) has announced that it will employ similar protocols to the NFL with regards to potential COVID-19 disruptions, but the CFL has explicitly specified that a double forfeit will be enforced if and when a game cannot be played because both teams cannot play due to COVID-19 violations, and also that players on teams in compliance will be paid for any games they may win by forfeit.

The Arena Football League has had two forfeits in its history, which came in 2012 as a result of a player's strike and another in 2024 due to a team boycotting a game as a protest of the management of the league. In another case in 2015, two teams ceased operations prior to the end of the season. Because they were both slated to play each other, the game was recorded as a scoreless tie.

A related concept is to vacate results, in which a team's wins are stricken from the record. NCAA bylaws allow wins to be vacated as a form of punishment, although the NFL does not. A loss is not put in place of a vacated win, and a win is not retroactively awarded to the losing team if vacated by the winning team. Once a team loses a game, even if the winning team's victory is later vacated, it is still considered a loss.

== Handball ==
In handball a game which results in a forfeit loss is counted 0–10 unless the goal difference of the game was bigger than the game result.

== Poker ==
In cases where a poker game is arranged but an opponent drops out or folds (a fold is when a player gives up for multiple reasons), that person forfeits and remaining players win at that player's expense.

== See also ==
- Walkover
