= 1910 All-Ireland Senior Football Championship =

Football championship

All-Ireland Champions
- Winning team: Louth (1st win)
- Captain: Larry McCormack

All-Ireland Finalists
- Losing team: Kerry
- Captain: Tom Costelloe

Provincial Champions
- Munster: Kerry
- Leinster: Louth
- Ulster: Antrim
- Connacht: Galway

Championship statistics

The 1910 All-Ireland Senior Football Championship was the 24th staging of Ireland's premier Gaelic football knock-out competition. Louth were the winners, receiving a walkover from Kerry in the final.

== Format ==
The four provincial championships were played as usual; the four champions joined London in the All-Ireland championship.

== Results ==
=== Connacht ===
Connacht Senior Football Championship

6 November 1910
Quarter-Final

Leitrim	0–3 – 0–0	Sligo

Carrick-on-Shannon

26 March 1911
Semi-Final

Galway	0–5 – 0–3	Leitrim

Athlone

16 July 1911
Semi-Final

Mayo	0–5 – 0–6	Roscommon

Athlone

==== Final ====
6 November 1910
Final

Roscommon	1–2 – 1–3	Galway

Athlone
Attendance: 3,000

=== Leinster ===
Leinster Senior Football Championship

1910
Preliminary Round

Dublin	1–11 – 0–5	Wicklow

Jones Road, Dublin

1910
Preliminary Round

Wexford	2–11 – 0–2	Laois

Jones Road, Dublin

1910
Quarter-Final

Wexford	0–1 – 1–6	Dublin

Jones Road, Dublin

19 June 1910
Quarter-Final

Offaly	1–9 – 0–5	Kilkenny

Maryboro

3 July 1910
Quarter-Final

Louth	3–12 – 0–10	Kildare

Jones Road, Dublin

1910
Semi-Final

Louth	3–12 – 1–3	Meath

Athletic Grounds, Dundalk

25 September 1910
Semi-Final

Offaly	1–0 – 3–7	Dublin

Jones Road, Dublin
Referee: J McHale

==== Final ====
16 October 1910

Louth	0–3 – 0–0	Dublin
J. Brennan 0–2, J. Bannon 0–1

Navan Showgrounds
Attendance: 5,000
Referee: S. McNamee (Meath)

1	Michael Byrne (Dundalk Young Irelands) (gk)
2	John Clarke (Tredaghs)
3	Joe Donnelly (Geraldines)
4	Jimmy Quinn (Tredaghs)
5	Joe Mulligan (Dundalk Young Irelands)
6	Jim Smith (Tredaghs)
7	Eddie Burke (Tredaghs)
8	Johnny Brennan (Dundalk Rangers)
9	Eoin Markey (Ardee Volunteers)
10	Tom Matthews (Ardee Volunteers)
11	Larry McCormack (Tredaghs) (c)
12	Jack Bannon (Tredaghs)
13	Michael Hand (Tredaghs)
14	Paddy Reilly (Tredaghs)
15	Jim McDonnell (Tredaghs)
16	Tom Morgan (Tredaghs)
17	Jack Carvin (Tredaghs)
Substitutes:
18	Jim Morgan (Dundalk Young Irelands) for McDonnell

1	P. Fallon (Geraldines) (gk)
2	D. Kavanagh (C.J. Kickhams)
3	H. Hilliard (C.J. Kickhams)
4	T. Walsh (C.J. Kickhams)
5	J. Brennan (Keatings)
6	T. Healy (Keatings)
7	T. Donnelly (Parnells)
8	E. Letman (Parnells)
9	J. Brennan (Sandymount)
10	J. Shouldice (Geraldines) (c)
11	J. Grace (C.J. Kickhams)
12	P. Daly (Geraldines)
13	P. Whelan (Geraldines)
14	D. Kelleher (Geraldines)
15	M. Collins (Geraldines)
16	R. Flood (Geraldines)
17	B. Halliden (Geraldines)

=== Munster ===
Munster Senior Football Championship

1910
Quarter-Final

Kerry	2–13 – 0–1	Waterford

Cork Athletic Grounds

1910
Quarter-Final

Clare	0–0 – 0–0	Limerick

Ennis

17 July 1910
Semi-Final

Cork	2–10 – 0–3	Tipperary

Dungarvan
Referee: J.F. O'Donnell (W)

2 October 1910
Semi-Final

Kerry	3–1 – 0–0	Clare

Market's Field, Limerick

==== Final ====
30 October 1910
Final

Kerry	0–4 – 0–2	Cork

Cork Athletic Grounds

=== Ulster ===
Ulster Senior Football Championship

1 May 1910
Quarter-Final

Monaghan	0–10 – 1–7	Armagh

Castleblayney

1 May 1910
Quarter-Final

Antrim	w/o – scr.	Down

Belfast

1 May 1910
Quarter-Final

Cavan	0–2 – 0–2 Abandoned	Fermanagh

Belturbet

Game abandoned after the ball burst.

3 July 1910
Quarter-Final Replay

Monaghan	1–5 – 0–4	Armagh

Crossmaglen

8 May 1910
Quarter-Final

Tyrone	w/o – scr.	Derry

3 July 1910
Quarter-Final Replay

Cavan	1–9 – 0–5	Fermanagh

Belturbet

17 July 1910
Semi-Final

Cavan	1–9 – 1–4	Tyrone

Bundoran

4 September 2010
Semi-Final

Antrim	1–4 – 1–3	Monaghan

Armagh

An objection was made and a replay ordered.

4 September 1910
Semi-Final Replay

Antrim	1–2 – 0–3	Monaghan

Athletic Grounds, Dundalk

==== Final ====
18 June 1911
Final

Antrim	3–4 – 0–1	Cavan

Athletic Grounds, Dundalk

=== Quarter-final ===
By the time the semi-final was to be played, the Leinster championship was not finished, so Dublin were nominated to represent Leinster. When Louth beat Dublin in the Leinster final, they were given Dublin's place in the All-Ireland semi-final.

9 October 1910
Quarter-Final

Dublin	3–5 – 1–2	Antrim

Jones' Road, Dublin

=== Semi-finals ===
21 August 1910
Semi-Final

Kerry	1–7 – 0–4	Galway

Tuam

11 September 1910
Semi-Final

Louth	3–4 – 1–2	London

Athletic Grounds, Dundalk

=== Final ===
13 November 1910
Final

Louth	w/o ^{1}	Kerry

Jones' Road, Dublin

^{1} The final was scratched, with Louth awarded the championship after Kerry refused to travel to Dublin. This was because the Great Southern and Western Railway company would not sell tickets to their supporters at reduced rates.

== Statistics ==
=== Miscellaneous ===
- It was the only year between 1907 and 2001 that there was a quarter-final in the All-Ireland Series and the only year from 1909 to 1974 that London played.
- Louth win a first All-Ireland title.
