= Dan McEvoy (Gaelic footballer) =

Personal information
- Full name: Dan McEvoy
- Nickname: Warren
- Born: 25 March 1885 Sunday's Gate, Drogheda, Louth, Ireland
- Died: 22 June 1949 (aged 64) 4 Bolton Square, Drogheda, Louth, Ireland

Sport
- Sport: Gaelic football
- Position: Right corner-forward
Club
- Years: Club
- Tredaghs
Inter-county
- Years: County
- 1910s: Louth
Inter-county titles
- Leinster titles: 1
- All-Irelands: 1

Dan "Warren" McEvoy was an Irish Gaelic footballer who played for Tredaghs of Drogheda and represented the Louth senior team during the early years of the Gaelic Athletic Association.

McEvoy was a member of the Louth team that won the 1912 All-Ireland Senior Football Championship, when Louth defeated Antrim in the final. He played at right corner-forward in the final.

== Club career ==
McEvoy played his club football with Tredaghs, one of the leading Gaelic football clubs in Louth during the early twentieth century. The club supplied many players to successful Louth teams of the period.

He was associated with the Tredaghs team that achieved success in Louth club competitions in the early 1900s, including the club's championship-winning teams.

== Inter-county career ==
McEvoy represented Louth during the county's successful period in the early All-Ireland championships. He was selected on the Louth team for the 1912 All-Ireland Senior Football Championship final, where Louth defeated Antrim to win the All-Ireland senior football title.

== Early life and personal life ==
McEvoy was a native of Drogheda and lived at Bolton Square in the town. He was employed by Drogheda Corporation for thirty-three years. He was married to Lizzie Lennon and they had several children.

== Legacy ==
The Dan McEvoy Cup was named in his honour in recognition of his contribution to Louth Gaelic football. The trophy has been associated with Louth club football competitions.
