= Cribbin =

Cribbin is a surname, and may refer to:

- J. J. Cribbin, Irish priest and Gaelic footballer who played for Ballyhaunis and Mayo
- Larry Cribbin, Irish Gaelic footballer who played for Clane and Kildare
- Tom Cribbin, Irish Gaelic footballer who played for Clane and managed Clane, Laois, Offaly and Westmeath

== See also ==
- Bernard Cribbins, English actor
