= Bill Guiry =

Irish Gaelic footballer

Personal information
- Native name: Liam Ó Gadhra (Irish)
- Occupation: Cap maker

Sport
- Sport: Gaelic football
Clubs
- Years: Club
- Commercials; Kickhams
Inter-county
- Years: County
- 1896 1897: Limerick; Dublin
Inter-county titles
- Munster titles: 1
- Leinster titles: 1
- All-Irelands: 2

William J. Guiry was an Irish Gaelic footballer. His championship career at senior level with the Limerick and Dublin county teams lasted two seasons from 1896 until 1897.

Guiry first played competitive football with the Commercials club in Limerick. He later joined the Kickhams club in Dublin and enjoyed championship success with both clubs.

Commercials represented Limerick in the 1896 championship, with Guiry lining out and winning a first All-Ireland medal. A year later he lined out with Dublin and won a second consecutive All-Ireland medal. Guiry also won a set of Munster and Leinster medals.

== Honours ==
Limerick

- All-Ireland Senior Football Championship (1): 1896
- Munster Senior Football Championship (1): 1896

Dublin

- All-Ireland Senior Football Championship (1): 1897
- Leinster Senior Football Championship (1): 1897
