= 1905 All-Ireland Senior Football Championship =

Football championship

Championship details
- Dates: 1905 – 16 June 1907

All-Ireland Champions
- Winning team: Kildare (1st win)
- Captain: Jack Murray

All-Ireland Finalists
- Losing team: Kerry
- Captain: Maurice McCarthy

Provincial Champions
- Munster: Kerry
- Leinster: Kildare
- Ulster: Cavan
- Connacht: Roscommon

Championship statistics

The 1905 All-Ireland Senior Football Championship was the 19th staging of Ireland's premier Gaelic football knock-out competition. Kildare were the winners ended 2 years of Kerry in the All Ireland final.

== Format ==
The four provincial championships were played as usual; the four champions joined London in the All-Ireland Championship.

== Results ==
=== Connacht ===
Connacht Senior Football Championship

8 April 1906
Semi-Final

Roscommon	0–8 – 0–3	Galway

Claremorris

29 April 1906
Semi-Final

Mayo	1–7 – 0–2	Sligo

Claremorris

27 May 1906
Final

Roscommon	0–7 – 0–5	Mayo

Tuam

=== Leinster ===
Leinster Senior Football Championship

1906
Quarter-Final

Kilkenny	2–7 – 1–4	Laois

Athy

1906
Quarter-Final

Louth	1–8 – 1–1	Wexford

Jones' Road, Dublin

19 August 1906
Quarter-Final

Dublin	0–2 – 0–6	Kildare

Athy

2 September 1906
Quarter-Final

Offaly	0–8 – 0–1	Meath

Jones' Road, Dublin
Referee: Joe Kenny

14 October 1906
Semi-Final

Kildare	1–6 – 0–6	Offaly

Geashill

1906
Semi-Final

Louth	0–5 – 0–5	Kilkenny

Jones' Road, Dublin

1906
Semi-Final 1st Replay

Louth	1–1 – 0–6	Kilkenny

Jones' Road, Dublin

An objection was made and a replay ordered.

1906
Semi-Final 2nd Replay

Louth	0–6 – 0–5	Kilkenny

Jones' Road, Dublin

6 January 1907 Final	Kildare	0–12 – 1–7	Louth	Jones' Road, Dublin
	J. Scott 0–4, F. Conlan 0–3, B. Losty 0–2, E. Kennedy, W. Bracken, W. Merriman 0–1 each		N. McCourt 1–0, M. Byrne, S. Fitzsimons, J. Hanlon, P. Hughes, J. Matthews, J. Mulligan, J. Ross 0–1 each	Referee: M.F. Crowe (Dublin)

1	Jack Fitzgerald (Roseberry) (gk)
2	Jack Murray (Roseberry) (c)
3	Jack Gorman (Roseberry)
4	Larry Cribbin (Clane)
5	Tom Brown (Roseberry)
6	William Merriman (Clane)
7	Edward Kennedy (Clane)
8	Mick Fitzgerald (Roseberry)
9	Joe Rafferty (Clane)
10	Mick Murray (Roseberry)
11	Mick Kennedy (Roseberry)
12	Jim Scott (Roseberry)
13	William Bracken (Clane)
14	Matt Donnelly (Roseberry)
15	Bill Losty (Clane)
16	Tom Crowley (Kilcock)
17	Frank Conlan (Roseberry)

1	Frank Ward (Dundalk Young Irelands) (gk)
2	Peter Markey (Ardee Volunteers)
3	Matt Coleman (Dundalk Young Irelands)
4	Arthur Hanratty (Dundalk John Dillons)
5	Joe Mulligan (Dundalk Young Irelands) (c)
6	Pat Brennan (Geraldines)
7	James Coburn (Geraldines)
8	Eoin Markey (Ardee Volunteers)
9	John McCabe (Geraldines)
10	Joe Hanlon (Dundalk Rangers)
11	William McAllister (Dundalk Young Irelands)
12	Joe Matthews (Geraldines)
13	Pat Hughes (Dundalk Young Irelands)
14	Stephen Fitzsimons (Dundalk Young Irelands)
15	Joe Ross (Dundalk Rangers)
16	Nick McCourt (Dundalk Young Irelands)
17	Michael Byrne (Geraldines)
Substitutes:
18	Nick Tuite (Dundalk John Dillons) for McAllister

=== Munster ===
Munster Senior Football Championship

1905
Preliminary Round

Waterford	2–10 – 0–6	Clare

Tipperary

27 August 1905
Quarter-Final

Kerry	5–8 – 1–4	Tipperary

Cork Athletic Grounds
Referee: W. Curtin (Cork)

13 May 1906
Quarter-Final

Cork	3–8 – 0–5	Waterford

Dungarvan

20 January 1907
Semi-Final

Kerry	1–7 – 0–5	Cork

Cork Athletic Grounds

7 April 1907
Final

Kerry	2–10 – 1–6	Limerick

Tralee

=== Ulster ===
Ulster Senior Football Championship

1905
Final

Cavan	0–7 – 0–3	Monaghan

=== Quarter-final ===
As the Leinster Championship was not finished by the time London was supposed to play their quarter-final, Dublin was nominated to face them. When Kildare won the Leinster Championship, they were deemed to have defeated London.

5 August 1906
Quarter-Final

Dublin	1–9 – 1–4	London

Jones' Road, Dublin

=== Semi-finals ===
2 September 1906
Semi-Final

Kerry	2–10 – 1–3	Roscommon

Limerick

30 September 1906; Semi-Final	Kildare	4–15 – 1–6	Cavan	Jones' Road, Dublin

=== Final ===
16 June 1907
Final

Kildare	1–7 – 0–5	Kerry
Ned Kennedy 0–3, Jack Connolly 1–0, Bill "Steel" Losty 0–2, Frank "Joyce" Conlan 0–1

Thurles
Attendance: 15,000
Referee: M. F. Crowe (Dublin)

== Statistics ==
=== Miscellaneous ===
- Roscommon are Connacht champions for the first time.
- Kildare are All Ireland champions for the first time.
