= Dave Kelleher =

Personal information
- Native name: Daithí Ó Céileachair (Irish)
- Born: 24 May 1887 Charleville, County Cork, Ireland
- Died: Unknown
- Occupation: Clerk

Sport
Club
- Years: Club
- Geraldines
Inter-county
- Years: County
- 1906-1915: Dublin
Inter-county titles
	Football	Hurling
Leinster Titles	3	1
All-Ireland Titles	3	0

David Patrick Kelleher (born 24 May 1887) was an Irish Gaelic footballer, hurler, athlete and golfer. His championship career as a dual player with the Dublin senior teams spanned ten seasons from 1906 until 1915.

Kelleher made his debut on the inter-county scene as a member of the Dublin senior football team during the 1906 championship. Over the course of the next decade, he won three successive All-Ireland medals between 1906 and 1908 when he captained the team. He also won three Leinster medals. As a hurler, Kelleher was a one-time Leinster medal winner.

== Honours ==
Dublin

- All-Ireland Senior Football Championship (3): 1906, 1907, 1908 (c)
- Leinster Senior Football Championship (3): 1906, 1907, 1908 (c)
- Leinster Senior Hurling Championship (3): 1908

Sporting positions
Preceded by Jack Grace	Dublin Senior Football Captain; 1908	Succeeded by
Achievements
Preceded by Jack Grace	All-Ireland Senior Football Final winning captain 1908	Succeeded by Tom Costello
