= 1889 Dublin Senior Hurling Championship =

Annual hurling competition season

- Champions: Kickhams (2nd title)
- Runners-up: Davitts

The 1889 Dublin Senior Hurling Championship was the third staging of the Dublin Senior Hurling Championship since its establishment by the Dublin County Board.

Kickhams entered the championship as the defending chammpions.

The final was played on 9 June 1889, between Kickhams and Davitts, in what was their first ever meeting in the final. Kickhams won the match by 3–07 to 0–05 to claim their second consecutive championship title.

== Results ==
=== Final ===
9 June 1889 Final	Kickhams	3-07 - 0-05	Davitts
