= 1897 All-Ireland Senior Football Championship final =

- Event: 1897 All-Ireland Senior Football Championship
Dublin	Cork
2–6 (12)	0–2 (2)
- Date: 5 February 1899
- Venue: Jones' Road, Dublin
- Referee: Spencer Lyons (Limerick)
- Attendance: 4,000
- Weather: fine

The 1897 All-Ireland Senior Football Championship final was the tenth All-Ireland Final and the deciding match of the 1897 All-Ireland Senior Football Championship, an inter-county Gaelic football tournament for the top teams in Ireland, played on 5 February 1899.

== Match ==
=== Summary ===
Dublin went into the final with a well-balanced team with players drawn from several counties, while Cork arrived on the back of a strong provincial campaign, including a win over the defending champions, Limerick Commercials. Despite this, they struggled to match expectations on the day.

The match began evenly, with both sides trading early pressure. Dublin opened the scoring with a point after a crowded passage of play near goal, and soon followed it up with a goal after sustained possession in the Cork half. Cork responded with a point but found it difficult to make further inroads. A wide from a promising attack and a poorly taken free typified their problems in the final third.

Dublin suffered a blow with the loss of T. Downey through injury but reorganised well, bringing in J. Flynn who contributed directly to the scoreboard. Cork were unable to take advantage of a subsequent free, and Dublin remained in control up to the break.

The first half ended with Dublin leading 1–2 to 0–1. Cork started the second half with more urgency and reduced the deficit with a point, but the game turned again when Bill Guiry struck a goal from a well-taken free. Cork pressed for a spell but failed to convert their chances.

As the match progressed, Dublin’s superior conditioning and organisation showed. They added three more points without reply, two from open play and one from a free. Cork had one further chance from a placed ball but failed to capitalise, while Dublin closed out the match with steady control.

=== Details ===
5 February 1899
12:30 IST
Final

Dublin	2–6 – 0–2	Cork
(HT: 1–2 – 0–1)
Gls: Bill Guiry 2 Pts: Bill Guiry (1f), P. Redmond, R. Scallan, F. Skelly, C. Ganon, others unknown		Gls: – Pts: Paul Geaney (1), unknown scorer (1)

Jones's Road, Dublin
Referee: Spencer Lyons (Limerick)
Attendance: 4,500

	Player
GK	P. Walsh (Captain)
	W. J. Guiry (Vice-captain)
	L. O'Kelly
	P. Donohoe
	C. Ganon
	R. O'Brien
	W. Calvan
	J. Matthews
	P. Redmond
	J. Flynn
	R. Scallan
	F. Skelly
	D. O’Connell
	M. Crambers
	T. Downey
	R. Curtis
	J. Delaney

	Player
GK	F. J. Crowley
	D. O’Donovan (Captain)
	J. Fuller (Vice-captain)
	J. O’Kelly-Lynch
	D. Crowley
	J. Crowley
	T. Gordan
	P. Gordan
	T. Coughlan
	C. Coughlan
	T. Crowley
	T. Mullane
	D. Coughlan
	J. Murphy
	J. Ahern
	D. Bernard
	T. Twohill
