= 1890 Cork Senior Football Championship =

Gaelic football competition

- Champions: Midleton (2nd title); Jim Power (captain)
- Runners-up: Dromtarriffe

The 1890 Cork Senior Football Championship was the fourth staging of the Cork Senior Football Championship since its establishment by the Cork County Board in 1887.

Midleton won the championship following a 2–03 to 0–02 defeat of Dromtarriffe in the final at Cork Park. This was their second championship title in succession and their second title overall. It remains their last championship success.

== Results ==
=== Final ===
13 July 1890 Final	Midleton	2-03 - 0-02	Dromtarriffe	Mallow Town Park
