= List of All-Ireland Senior Football Championship semi-finals =

Ireland football competition

The All-Ireland Senior Football Championship semi-finals are played to determine which teams will contest the All-Ireland Football Final. They are the penultimate phase of the All-Ireland Senior Football Championship, a Gaelic football competition contested by the top teams in Ireland. The semi-finals are usually contested at Croke Park, Dublin.

2026: Louth 0–15 (15) – (32) 3–23 Mayo Dublin 0–20 (20) – (24) 2–18 Kerry

2025: Tyrone 0–17 (17) – (23) 1–20 Kerry Donegal 3-26 (35) – (15) 0–15 Meath

2024: Armagh 1–18 – 1–16 (a.e.t.) Kerry Donegal 0–15 – 1–14 Galway

2023: Dublin 1–17 – 0–13 Monaghan Kerry 1–17 – 1–15 Derry

2022: Galway 2–8 (14) – (9) 1–6 Derry Dublin 1–13 (16) – (17) 1–14 Kerry

2021: Mayo 0–17 – 0–14 (a.e.t.) Dublin Kerry 0–22 (22) – (23) 3–14 (a.e.t.) Tyrone

2020: Dublin 1–24 (27) – (12) 0–12 Cavan Mayo 5–20 (35) – (22) 3–13 Tipperary

2019: Mayo 1–10 (13) – (23) 3–14 Dublin Tyrone 0–18 (18) – (21) 1–18 Kerry

2018: Dublin 1–24 (27) – (18) 2–12 Galway Monaghan 0–15 (15) – (16) 1–13 Tyrone

2017: Mayo 2–14 – 2–14 Kerry Mayo 2–16 – 0–17 (replay) Kerry Dublin 2–17 – 0–11 Tyrone

2016: Mayo 2–13 – 0–14 Tipperary Dublin 0–22 – 2–14 Kerry

2015: Kerry 0–18 – 1–11Tyrone Dublin 2–12 – 1–15 Mayo Dublin 3–15 – 1–14 (replay) Mayo

2014: Kerry 1–16 – 1–16 Mayo Kerry 3–16 – 3–13 (replay, a.e.t.) Mayo Donegal 3–14 – 0–17 Dublin

2013: Mayo 1–16 – 0–13 Tyrone Kerry 3–11 – 3–18 Dublin

2012: Cork 1–11 – 0–16 Donegal Mayo 0–19 – 0–16 Dublin

2011: Mayo 1–11 – 1–20 Kerry Dublin 0–8 – 0–6 Donegal

2010: Cork 1–15 – 1–14 Dublin Kildare 1–14 – 1–16 Down

2009: Cork 1–13 – 0–11 Tyrone Kerry 2–8 – 1–7 Meath

2008: Kerry 1–13 – 3–7 Cork Kerry 3–14 – 2–13 (replay) Cork Wexford 1–14 – 0–23 Tyrone

2007: Cork 1–16 0–9 Meath Dublin 0–16 1–15 Kerry

2006: Kerry 0–16 – 0–10 Cork Mayo 1–16 – 2–12 Dublin

2005: Kerry 1–19 – 0–9 Cork Tyrone 1–11 – 1–12 Armagh

2004: Mayo 0–9 – 0–9 Fermanagh Mayo 0–13 – 1–8 (replay) Fermanagh Derry 1–11 – 1–17 Kerry

2003: Kerry 0–6 – 0–13 Tyrone Armagh 2–10 – 1–9 Donegal

2002: Kerry 3–19 – 2–7 Cork Armagh 1–14 – 1–13 Dublin
