= Dick Flavin (Gaelic footballer) =

Irish Gaelic footballer

Personal information
- Born: 27 December 1878 Youghal, County Cork, Ireland
- Died: Unknown
- Occupation: Grocer

Sport
- Sport: Gaelic Football
- Position: Goalkeeper
Club
- Years: Club
- 1890s-1910s: Youghal
Club titles
- Cork titles: 0
Inter-county
- Years: County
- 1905-1909: Cork
Inter-county titles
- Munster titles: 2
- All-Irelands: 0

Richard Flavin (born 27 December 1878) is an Irish Gaelic footballer who played as a goalkeeper for the Cork senior team.

Flavin made his first appearance for the team during the 1905 championship and was a regular member of the starting fifteen for a number of seasons until his retirement during the 1909 championship. During that time he won two Munster medals but failed to capture an All-Ireland medal.

At club level Flavin played with Youghal.
