= 1925 All-Ireland Senior Football Championship =

Football championship

All-Ireland Champions
- Winning team: Galway (1st win)
- Captain: Michael Walsh (St Grellan's, Ballinasloe)

All-Ireland Finalists
- Losing team: Cavan

Provincial Champions
- Munster: Kerry
- Leinster: Wexford
- Ulster: Cavan
- Connacht: Galway

Championship statistics

The 1925 All-Ireland Senior Football Championship was the 39th staging of Ireland's premier Gaelic football knock-out competition. Galway were the winners.

In 1924 Kerry won the All Ireland title.

The championship has become known for the farcical manner in which the title was awarded. There was no 1925 All-Ireland Football Final.

The Connacht final had not been held by the time the semi-finals were played; Mayo were nominated to represent the province. In the semi-finals, Mayo beat Wexford and Kerry beat Cavan. However, both Kerry and Cavan were disqualified for fielding illegal players. This meant that Mayo were declared champions without the need for a final. Following this, however, Galway defeated Mayo in the Connacht final. Galway were therefore proclaimed All-Ireland champions.

Following protests from Galway, Kerry and Mayo, the GAA Central Council organised a substitute competition between the four provincial champions, with Galway as Connacht champions. However, Kerry complained that their semi-final victory over Cavan should stand in this new competition. When the GAA insisted that it should not stand, Kerry withdrew, leaving Cavan to automatically proceed to the final. Galway defeated Cavan in the final of that tournament, which was played on 10 January 1926.

== Results ==
=== Connacht ===
Connacht Senior Football Championship

17 May 1925
Quarter-Final

| Roscommon | 2–4 – 2–2 | Sligo |

Boyle

An objection was made and a replay ordered.

28 June 1925
Semi-Final

| Galway | 1–1 – 1–1 | Leitrim |

Castlerea

5 July 1925
Quarter-Final, 1st Replay

| Roscommon | 1–5 – 1–5 A.E.T. | Sligo |

Roscommon

19 July 1925
Quarter-Final, 2nd Replay

| Roscommon | 1–3 – 0–6 A.E.T. | Sligo |

Sligo

26 July 1925
Quarter-Final, 3rd Replay

| Roscommon | 2–0 – 0–6 A.E.T. | Sligo |

Boyle

2 August 1925
Quarter-Final, 4th Replay

| Roscommon | 1–5 – 1–3 | Sligo |

Roscommon

An objection was made and a replay ordered.

2 August 1925
Semi-Final, 1st Replay

| Galway | 1–4 – 2–1 A.E.T. | Leitrim |

Roscommon

13 September 1925
Quarter-Final, 5th Replay

| Roscommon | 0–2 – 2–3 | Sligo |

Roscommon

13 September 1925
Semi-Final, 2nd Replay

| Galway | 1–4 – 0–5 | Leitrim |

Roscommon

4 October 1925
Semi-Final

| Mayo | 2–6 – 1–6 | Sligo |

Tuam

18 October 1925
Final

| Galway | 1–5 – 1–3 | Mayo |

Tuam
Attendance: 26,000

=== Leinster ===
Leinster Senior Football Championship

03 May 1925
Preliminary Round

| Kilkenny | 2–4 – 0–3 | Longford |

Croke Park, Dublin
Referee: Seán O'Neill

17 May 1925
Preliminary Round

| Kildare | 5–8 – 1–0 | Carlow |

Geraldine Park, Athy

24 May 1925
Preliminary Round

| Louth | 4–2 – 3–3 | Laois |

Croke Park, Dublin
Referee: Sean O'Neill (Dublin)

1925
Quarter-Final

| Wexford | 4–9 – 0–2 | Meath |

Croke Park, Dublin

12 July 1925
Quarter-Final

| Louth | 0–7 – 0–3 | Kilkenny |

Croke Park, Dublin

5 July 1925
Semi-Final

| Dublin | 0–6 – 2–4 | Wexford |

St James Park, Kilkenny
Referee: T. Walsh (Kilkenny)

2 August 1925
Semi-Final

| Louth | 0–5 – 3–3 | Kildare |

Croke Park, Dublin
Referee: J. Delaney (Laois)

23 August 1925
Final

| Wexford | 2–7 – 0–3 | Kildare |

Croke Park, Dublin
Attendance: 12,000
Referee: Tom Burke (Louth)

=== Munster ===
Munster Senior Football Championship

31 May 1925
Quarter-Final

| Kerry | 1–2 – 0–4 | Tipperary |

Limerick
Referee: A. Quillinan (Limerick)

An objection was made and a replay ordered.

28 June 1925
Quarter-Final Replay

| Kerry | 3–1 – 0–4 | Tipperary |

Cork
Referee: W. P. Aherne (Cork)

19 July 1925
Quarter-Final

| Cork | 1–3 – 1–1 | Limerick |

Buttevant

14 June 1925
Semi-Final

| Clare | 2–2 – 0–1 | Waterford |

Miltown Malbay

16 August 1925
Semi-Final

| Kerry | 3–8 – 1–0 | Cork |

Tralee

13 September 1925
Final

| Kerry | 5–5 – 0–0 | Clare |

Killarney

=== Ulster ===
Ulster Senior Football Championship

3 May 1925
Quarter-Final

| Monaghan | 1–3 – 0–5 | Armagh |

St. Mary's Park, Castleblayney

An objection was made and a replay ordered.

10 May 1925
Quarter-Final

| Antrim | 0–16 – 0–1 | Down |

Pairc Esler, Newry

24 May 1925
Quarter-Final

| Cavan | 1–5 – 1–3 | Tyrone |

Dungannon

14 June 1925
Quarter-Final

| Fermanagh | 3–6 – 0–1 | Donegal |

Ballyshannon

21 June 1925
Quarter-Final Replay

| Monaghan | 2–2 – 1–4 | Armagh |

St. Mary's Park, Castleblayney

5 July 1925
Semi-Final

| Antrim | 2–5 – 0–4 | Monaghan |

Pairc Esler, Newry

19 July 1925
Semi-Final

| Cavan | 0–18 – 0–2 | Donegal |

Ballyshannon

2 August 1925
Final

| Cavan | 2–3 – 3–0 | Antrim |

Monaghan
Attendance: 6,000

16 August 1925
Final Replay

| Cavan | 3–6 – 0–1 | Antrim |

Belturbet
Attendance: 6,000

=== Semi-finals ===
The Connacht championship was not finished in time, so Mayo were nominated to play in the All-Ireland semi-final.

23 August 1925
Semi-Final

| Kerry | 1–7 – 2–3 | Cavan |

Tralee
Attendance: 5000

Both teams lodged objections against each other, and both were disqualified.

30 August 1925
Semi-Final

| Mayo | 2–4 – 1–4 | Wexford |

Croke Park, Dublin

With both Kerry and Cavan disqualified, Mayo now had no opponent to play in the All-Ireland final. And when Galway defeated Mayo in the Connacht final, the GAA decided to award the All-Ireland title to Galway.

Galway were declared All-Ireland Champions on 5 December 1925. The All-Ireland Championship of 1925 was declared to be finished.

A substitute competition was organised by Central Council. Kerry, Cavan, Wexford and Galway were invited to participate. Kerry wanted their victory over Cavan to stand, but when they were ordered to replay it, they withdrew in protest.

Galway won the substitute competition, but this game had no bearing on their status as All-Ireland Champions. They entered the final game as All-Ireland Champions and the match had no bearing on the destination of the title.

=== Central Council Tournament ===
Semi-Final

| Cavan | w/o – scr. | Kerry |

6 December 1925
Semi-Final

| Galway | 3–4 – 1–1 | Wexford |

Croke Park, Dublin

10 January 1926
Final

| Galway | 3–2 – 1–2 | Cavan |

Croke Park, Dublin

== Statistics ==
=== Miscellaneous ===
- There were a number of replays, mostly due to draws, but on some occasions resulting from objections: in the Connacht championship Galway met Leitrim three times and Sligo met Roscommon six times (once after a disputed result); in the Munster championship the Kerry vs Tipperary match went to a replay due to a disputed result; and in the Ulster championship Monaghan vs Armagh was also replayed following an objection.
- Galway became the first Connacht county to win an All-Ireland title and first not from Munster or Leinster.
