= Mick Coleman =

Irish Gaelic footballer

Michael Coleman
Personal information
- Native name: Mícheál Ó Colmáin (Irish)
- Born: 1871 Midleton, County Cork, Ireland
- Died: 1961 (aged 89–90)
- Occupation: General labourer

Sport
- Sport: Gaelic Football
Club
- Years: Club
- Midleton
Club titles
- Cork titles: 1
Inter-county*
| Years | County | Apps (scores) |
| 1890-1894 | Cork | 10 |
Inter-county titles
- Munster titles: 2
- All-Irelands: 1
- *Inter County team apps and scores correct as of 20:48, 28 April 2012.

Michael Coleman (1871-1961) was an Irish Gaelic footballer who played for the Cork senior team.

Coleman made his first appearance for the team during the 1890 championship and was a regular member of the starting fifteen until the end of the 1894 championship. During that time he won one All-Ireland medal and two Munster medals.

At club level Moore was a one-time county championship medalist with Midleton.
