= 1890 Dublin Senior Hurling Championship =

Annual hurling competition season

- Champions: Kickhams (3rd title)
- Runners-up: Erin's Pride

The 1890 Dublin Senior Hurling Championship was the fourth staging of the Dublin Senior Hurling Championship since its establishment by the Dublin County Board.

Kickhams entered the championship as the defending chammpions.

The final was played on 20 July 1890 at Clonturk Park in Dublin, between Kickhams and Erin's Pride, in what was their first ever meeting in the final. Kickhams won the match by 3–06 to 0–02 to claim their third consecutive championship title.

== Results ==
=== Final ===
20 July 1890 Final	Kickhams	3-06 - 0-02	Erin's Pride	Clonturk Park
