= 1912 All-Ireland Senior Football Championship =

Football championship

All-Ireland Champions
- Winning team: Louth (2nd win)
- Captain: Jim Smith

All-Ireland Finalists
- Losing team: Antrim
- Captain: John Coburn

Provincial Champions
- Munster: Kerry
- Leinster: Louth
- Ulster: Antrim
- Connacht: Roscommon

Championship statistics

The 1912 All-Ireland Senior Football Championship was the 26th staging of Ireland's premier Gaelic football knock-out competition. The Munster Quarter-Final Kerry ended Cork's All Ireland title. Louth were the winners.

== Results ==
=== Connacht ===
Connacht Senior Football Championship

21 July 1912
Semi-Final

Mayo	0–3 – 4–4	Galway

Roscommon

1 September 1912
Semi-Final

Roscommon	0–3 – 0–1	Leitrim

Carrick-on-Shannon

==== Final ====
15 September 1912
Final

Roscommon	0–2 – 0–0	Galway

Castlerea

=== Leinster ===
Leinster Senior Football Championship

23 June 1912
Preliminary Round

Kilkenny	1–4 – 0–3	Meath

Jones Road, Dublin

1912
Quarter-Final

Kilkenny	0–0 – 0–0	Dublin

Enniscorthy

1912
Quarter-Final 1st Replay

Kilkenny	2–3 – 2–3 A.E.T.	Dublin

Athy

1912
Quarter-Final 2nd Replay

Kilkenny	0–1 – 3–4	Dublin

Jones Road, Dublin

23 June 1912
Quarter-Final

Louth	1–2 – 0–2	Kildare

Jones Road, Dublin

1912
Quarter-Final

Wicklow	4–4 – 1–3	Wexford

New Ross

16 June 1912
Quarter-Final

Laois	0–2 – 2–2	Dublin

Maryboro
Referee: J Boylan

4 August 1912
Semi-Final

Louth	1–2 – 0–1	Offaly

Jones Road, Dublin
Referee: John May (Kildare)

1912
Semi-Final

Wicklow	0–0 – 0–0	Dublin

Wexford Park, Wexford

1912
Semi-Final Replay

Wicklow	0–4 – 1–4	Dublin

Wexford Park, Wexford

==== Final ====
20 October 1912

Louth	1–02 – 1–01	Dublin
J. Mulligan 1–0 ('45), J. Johnston, D. McEvoy 0–1 each		T. Doherty 1–0, H. Hilliard 0–1

Navan Showgrounds
Referee: John May (Kildare)

1	Michael Byrne (Dundalk Young Irelands) (gk)
2	John Clarke (Tredaghs)
3	John Fitzsimons (Dundalk Young Irelands)
4	Pat Carroll (Dundalk Young Irelands)
5	Joe Mulligan (Dundalk Young Irelands)
6	Jim Smith (Tredaghs) (c)
7	Eddie Burke (Tredaghs)
8	Joe Johnston (Geraldines)
9	Johnny Brennan (Dundalk Rangers)
10	Eoin Markey (Ardee St Mochta's)
11	George Campbell (Ardee St Mochta's)
12	Tom Matthews (Ardee St Mochta's)
13	Jack Carvin (Tredaghs)
14	Dan McEvoy (Tredaghs)
15	Jack Bannon (Tredaghs)
16	Larry McCormack (Tredaghs)
17	Paddy Reilly (Tredaghs)

1	M. Collins (Geraldines) (gk)
2	P. Fallon (Geraldines)
3	B. Halliden (Geraldines)
4	R. Flood (Geraldines)
5	J. Parker (Geraldines)
6	R. Manifold (Parnells)
7	M. Manifold (Parnells)
8	P. Brady (Parnells)
9	C. Flynn (Keatings)
10	R. Mullen (Keatings)
11	D. Kavanagh (C.J. Kickhams) (c)
12	T. Walsh (C.J. Kickhams)
13	J. Grace (C.J. Kickhams)
14	H. Hilliard (C.J. Kickhams)
15	M. Kelly (C.J. Kickhams)
16	T. Doherty (C.J. Kickhams)
17	R. Downey (C.J. Kickhams)

=== Munster ===
Munster Senior Football Championship

1912
Quarter-Final

Waterford	0–5 – 0–1	Limerick

Waterford

23 June 1912
Quarter-Final

Kerry	2–3 – 0–1	Cork

Tralee

21 July 1912
Semi-Final

Clare	2–2 – 1–0	Tipperary

Tipperary
Referee: J. Cooke (W)

15 September 1912
Semi-Final

Kerry	1–4 – 0–1	Waterford

Fermoy
Referee: W. Mackessy (Cork)

==== Final ====
20 October 1912
Final

Kerry	0–3 – 0–1	Clare

Ennis

=== Ulster ===
Ulster Senior Football Championship

1912
Quarter-Final

Armagh	w/o – scr.	Down

26 May 1912
Quarter-Final

Cavan	2–2 – 0–2	Fermanagh

Wattlebridge

12 May 1912
Semi-Final

Antrim	3–1 – 0–5	Monaghan

Clones

14 July 1912
Semi-Final

Cavan	0–1 – 0–1	Armagh

Newbliss

4 August 1912
Semi-Final Replay

Cavan	1–2 – 1–1	Armagh

Newbliss

==== Final ====
10 November 1912
Final

Antrim	2–2 – 0–1	Armagh

Castleblayney

=== Semi-finals ===
By the time the semi-final was to be played, the Leinster championship was not finished, so Dublin were nominated to represent Leinster. When Louth beat Dublin in the Leinster final, they were given Dublin's place in the All-Ireland final.

25 August 1912
Semi-Final

Antrim	3–5 – 0–2	Kerry

Jones' Road, Dublin

29 September 1912
Semi-Final

Dublin	2–4 – 1–1	Roscommon

Jones' Road, Dublin

=== Final ===
3 November 1912
Final

Louth	1–7 – 1–2	Antrim

Jones' Road, Dublin
Attendance: 13,000
Referee: Tom Irwin (Cork)

== Statistics ==
=== Miscellaneous ===
- Louth win a second All-Ireland football title.
