= Stephen Fitzsimons =

Irish Gaelic footballer

Stephen Fitzsimons (4 February 1882 – 14 January 1952) was an Irish Gaelic footballer. His championship career with the Louth senior team spanned several seasons during the first decade of the 20th century and he won an All-Ireland medal in 1912. His brother, John Fitzsimons, also had All-Ireland success with Louth.

== Honours ==
Louth

- All-Ireland Senior Football Championship (1): 1912
- Leinster Senior Football Championship (1): 1912
