= Jack Grace =

Irish Gaelic footballer

Personal information
- Native name: Seán Grás (Irish)
- Born: 8 February 1884 Tullaroan, County Kilkenny, Ireland
- Died: 9 March 1915 (aged 31) Jervis Street Hospital, Dublin, Ireland
- Occupation: Draper

Sport
- Football Position: Full-back
- Hurling Position: Half-back
Club
- Years: Club
- Kickhams
Club titles
	Football	Hurling
Dublin titles	4	1
Inter-county
- Years: County
- 1901-1912: Dublin
Inter-county titles
	Football	Hurling
Leinster Titles	6	3
All-Ireland Titles	5	0

Jack Grace (8 February 1884 – 9 March 1915) was an Irish Gaelic footballer and hurler. His championship career as a dual player with the Dublin senior teams spanned twelve seasons from 1901 until 1912.

Born in Tullaroan, County Kilkenny, Grace was one of eleven children born to Nicholas and Kate Grace (née Keoghan). Raised on the family farm, Grace was educated locally before moving to Dublin in his teens to take up a position in the drapery trade with Todd, Burns & Co.

After moving to Dublin, Grace joined the Kickhams club where he played both hurling and Gaelic football. He won four successive county football championship medals between 1904 and 1907, while he also won a county hurling championship medal with the club in 1908.

Grace was just eighteen-years-old when he made his debut on the inter-county scene as a member of the Dublin senior football team in the delayed 1901 championship. Over the course of the next decade, he won five All-Ireland medals, beginning with back-to-back wins in 1901 and 1902, followed by three successive championships between 1906 and 1908. He also won six Leinster medals. As a hurler, Grace was a three-time Leinster medal winner.

Grace's brothers - Pierce and Dick - also had All-Ireland success in both codes with Kilkenny and Dublin. Between them, the three Grace brothers had a total of 15 All-Ireland medals.

Grace died from pneumonia on 9 March 1915.

== Honours ==
Kickhams

- Dublin Senior Football Championship (4): 1904, 1905, 1906, 1907
- Dublin Senior Hurling Championship (1): 1908

Dublin

- All-Ireland Senior Football Championship (5): 1901, 1902, 1906 (c), 1907 (c), 1908
- Leinster Senior Football Championship (6): 1901, 1902, 1904, 1906 (c), 1907 (c), 1908
- Leinster Senior Hurling Championship (3): 1902, 1906, 1908 (c)

Sporting positions
Preceded by	Dublin Senior Football Captain; 1906-1907	Succeeded by Dave Kelleher
Preceded by Joe Hickey	Dublin Senior Hurling Captain; 1908	Succeeded by
Achievements
Preceded by Jack Murray	All-Ireland Senior Football Final winning captain 1906-1907	Succeeded by Dave Kelleher
