= Patrick Moore (Gaelic footballer) =

Irish Gaelic footballer

Personal information
- Native name: Pádraig Ó Mordha (Irish)
- Born: 1867 Midleton, County Cork, Ireland
- Died: Unknown
- Occupation: Horse dealer

Sport
- Sport: Gaelic Football
Club
- Years: Club
- Midleton
Club titles
- Cork titles: 2
Inter-county*
Years	County	Apps (scores)
1889-1890	Cork	7
Inter-county titles
- Munster titles: 1
- All-Irelands: 1
- *Inter County team apps and scores correct as of 20:48, 28 April 2012.

Patrick D. Moore (born 1867) was an Irish Gaelic footballer who played for the Cork senior team.

Moore made his first appearance for the team during the 1889 championship and was a regular member of the starting fifteen for the next two seasons. During that time, he won one All-Ireland medal and one Munster medal.

At club level, Moore was a two-time county championship medalist with Midleton.
