= 1893 All-Ireland Senior Football Championship final =

- Event: 1893 All-Ireland Senior Football Championship
Wexford	Cork
1–1	0–1
- Date: 24 June 1894
- Venue: Phoenix Park, Dublin
- Referee: T. Gilligan (Dublin)
- Attendance: 1,000

The 1893 All-Ireland Senior Football Championship final was the sixth All-Ireland Final and the deciding match of the 1893 All-Ireland Senior Football Championship, an inter-county Gaelic football tournament for the top teams in Ireland.

== Match ==
=== Summary ===
Wexford were represented by Young Irelands, a club based in the Selskar area of Wexford town, while Cork were represented by Dromtariffe. Young Irelands wore green jerseys with a gold harp, Dromtariffe's original colours were green with a gold sash.

Wexford led 1–1 to 0–1 early in the second half, when a pitch invasion began and several players were injured. The referee tried to restart the game with substitutes to replace injured players, but Cork refused. Wexford were awarded the title.

Cork and Wexford did not meet again in the championship until 2010.

=== Details ===
24 June 1894

Wexford	1-1 – 0-1	Cork

Phoenix Park, Dublin
Attendance: 1,000
Referee: T Gilligan (Dublin)

==== Cork ====
- Jack O'Keeffe (c)
- M. O'Keeffe
- P. J. O'Sullivan
- Tom Irwin
- Dan O'Hanlon
- R. Mulcahy
- James Coughlan
- Michael Buckley
- W. O'Riordan
- T. Healy
- James Mulcahy
- Tim Burton
- John O'Leary
- J. Vaughan
- Tim Forrest
- Denis Doherty
- J. O'Riordan

Subs
Murty Downey
Andy Desmond
