= Jeremiah Leahy =

Irish Gaelic footballer

Personal information
- Native name: Diarmuid Ó Liathaigh (Irish)
- Born: 31 January 1866 Midleton, County Cork, Ireland
- Died: 26 July 1950 (aged 84) Mercy Hospital, Cork, Ireland
- Occupation: Rates collector

Sport
- Sport: Gaelic Football
Club
- Years: Club
- Midleton
Club titles
- Cork titles: 2
Inter-county*
Years	County	Apps (scores)
1889-1890	Cork	7
Inter-county titles
- Munster titles: 2
- All-Irelands: 1
- *Inter County team apps and scores correct as of 20:48, 28 April 2012.

Jeremiah J. Leahy (31 January 1866 – 26 July 1950) was an Irish Gaelic footballer who played for the Cork senior team.

Leahy made his first appearance for the team during the 1889 championship and was a regular member of the starting fifteen for the next two seasons. During that time he won one All-Ireland medal and one Munster medal.

At club level Leahy was a double county championship medalist with Midleton.
