= Larry McCormack =

Irish Gaelic footballer

Personal information
- Native name: Labhrás Mac Cormaic (Irish)
- Born: 20 May 1882 Drogheda, County Louth, Ireland
- Died: 13 September 1935 (aged 53) Drogheda, County Louth, Ireland
- Occupation: Motor proprietor

Sport
- Sport: Gaelic football
Clubs
- Years: Club
- Tredaghs; Boyne Rangers
Club titles
- Louth titles: 5
Inter-county
- Years: County
- 1904-1919: Louth
Inter-county titles
- Leinster titles: 3
- All-Irelands: 2

Laurence McCormack (20 May 1882 – 13 September 1935) was an Irish Gaelic footballer. His championship career with the Louth senior team spanned fifteen years from 1904 until 1919. He captained his county to victory in the All-Ireland Senior Football Championship of 1910. In a 2000 poll he was nominated as one of the greatest ever Louth footballers. His great-grandson Colin Kelly followed in his footsteps by giving long service to Louth, as both player and manager.

== Honours ==
Tredaghs

- Louth Senior Football Championship (4): 1906, 1909, 1910, 1912
- Louth Junior Football Championship (1): 1904

Boyne Rangers

- Louth Senior Football Championship (1): 1921

Drogheda Stars

- Louth Junior Football Championship (1): 1914

Louth

- All-Ireland Senior Football Championship (2): 1910, 1912
- Leinster Senior Football Championship (3): 1909, 1910, 1912

Sporting positions
Preceded by Jack Carvin	Louth Senior Football Captain; 1910	Succeeded by
Preceded by Jim Smith	Louth Senior Football Captain; 1913-14	Succeeded by
Achievements
Preceded by Tom Costello	All-Ireland Senior Football Final winning captain 1910	Succeeded by Mick Mehigan
