= Jack Carvin =

Irish Gaelic footballer

John "Jack" Carvin
Personal information
- Native name: Seán Ó Cearbháin (Irish)
- Nickname: Sandman
- Born: 1 March 1878 Balbriggan, County Dublin, Ireland
- Died: 9 November 1943 (aged 65) Drogheda, County Louth, Ireland
- Occupation: Dock labourer

Sport
- Sport: Gaelic football
Clubs
- Years: Club
- Drogheda Owen Roes; Kickhams; Drogheda Independents; Boyne Rovers; Dundalk Young Irelands; Tredaghs
Club titles
- Louth titles: 7
Inter-county
- Years: County
- 1900-1916: Louth
Inter-county titles
- Leinster titles: 2
- All-Irelands: 1

John "Jack" "Sandman" Carvin (1 March 1878 – 9 November 1943) was an Irish Gaelic footballer. His championship career with the Meath, Dublin and Louth senior county teams spanned eighteen years from 1898 until 1916. He was a fascinating character described in 1946 by the legendary GAA writer Paddy Mehigan as "Louth’s greatest footballer". In 1889 his father's ship was run down by a steamer and he was sent to work in his uncle’s quarry in Bohernabreena - hence the nickname "Sandman". There with his exceptionally long arms and great strength he astounded the GAA people of Dublin and joined Kickhams.

It was back to Drogheda and 2 bloodless Louth titles in 1900 & ‘01 when his club Drogheda Independents were the only club affiliated. Independents won again in 1902, then further medals with Boyne Rovers (1904), Dundalk Young Irelands (’05), and finally Tredaghs in 1906, ‘09 and ‘10. In 1905 the Great Southern & Western Railway presented a Shield for an inter-provincial competition and Jack played for Leinster in 1906 and 1907 the only 2 years in which it was run.

Played 35 Championship matches between 1900 and 1916 he missed the 1912 All-Ireland Final through injury. An all-round sportsman he was a noted handballer and was also one of 4 players who missed the 1902 championship when they were suspended for playing soccer.

In 1910 Jack's team, Louth team were scheduled to play against Kerry at the All Ireland final on Jones Road, (now Croke Park). It was never played. Kerry refused to travel and Louth were awarded and accepted a walk- over from the Centrel Council in the first ever GAA strike.

In 1916, since many players had been imprisoned, he played his last tournament outside of Frongach prison camps in Wales. In that tournament, his team, Louth, won against Mayo.

He finished his days working on the Drogheda Docks.

== Honours ==
Drogheda Owen Roes

- Meath Senior Football Championship (1): 1897

Drogheda Independents

- Louth Senior Football Championship (2): 1901, 1902

Boyne Rovers

- Louth Senior Football Championship (1): 1904

Dundalk Young Irelands

- Louth Senior Football Championship (1): 1905

Tredaghs

- Louth Senior Football Championship (3): 1906, 1909, 1910

Louth

- All-Ireland Senior Football Championship (1): 1910
- Leinster Senior Football Championship (2): 1909, 1910

Sporting positions
Preceded by	Louth Senior Football Captain; 1909	Succeeded by Larry McCormack
