= Jim Smith (Louth Gaelic footballer) =

Irish Gaelic footballer

Personal information
- Native name: Séamus Mac Gabhann (Irish)
- Nickname: Jem
- Born: James Valentine Smith; 13 February 1887 Drogheda, County Louth, Ireland
- Died: 10 November 1951 (aged 64) Drogheda, County Louth, Ireland
- Occupation: Farmer

Sport
- Sport: Gaelic football
- Position: Centre-back
Clubs
- Years: Club
- Bettystown; Tredaghs
Club titles
- Louth titles: 2
Inter-county
| Years | County | Apps (scores) |
| 1909 1910-1919 | Meath; Louth | 1; 28 |
Inter-county titles
- Leinster titles: 2
- All-Irelands: 2

James Valentine Smith (13 February 1887 – 10 November 1951) was an Irish Gaelic footballer. His championship career with the Meath and Louth senior teams spanned eleven seasons from 1909 until 1919.

Born in Drogheda, County Louth, Smith was born to Francis and Margaret Smith (née Eakins). He was educated locally before later moving to Julianstown where he worked as a farmer.

Smith first played club football with the Bettystown club in Meath and won a county junior championship medal in 1908. He later transferred to the Tredaghs club in Drogheda and won county senior championship medals in 1910 and 1912.

Smith made his debut on the inter-county scene as a member of the Meath junior and senior teams during the 1909 championship. After one season he transferred to Louth where he captained the team to All-Ireland titles in 1910 and 1912. Smith also won two Leinster medals. He retired from inter-county football following the conclusion of the 1919 championship.

Smith died at the age of 64 following a car accident on 10 November 1951.

== Honours ==
Bettystown

- Meath Junior Football Championship (1): 1908

Tredaghs

- Louth Senior Football Championship (2): 1910, 1912

Louth

- All-Ireland Senior Football Championship (2): 1910, 1912 (c)
- Leinster Senior Football Championship (2): 1910, 1912 (c)

Sporting positions
| Preceded by | Louth Senior Football Captain; 1912 | Succeeded by Larry McCormack |

| Preceded by Mick Mehigan | All-Ireland Senior Football Final winning captain 1912 | Succeeded by Dick Fitzgerald |
