= Larry Cribbin =

Irish Gaelic footballer and hurler

Personal information
- Native name: Labhrás Mac Roibín (Irish)
- Born: 27 August 1880 Clane, County Kildare, Ireland
- Died: 15 October 1962 (aged 82) Clane, County Kildare, Ireland
- Occupation: Agricultural labourer

Sport
- Sport: Gaelic football
- Position: Goalkeeper
Club
- Years: Club
- Clane
Club titles
	Football	Hurling
Kildare titles	4	10
Inter-county
- Years: County
- 1901-1920: Kildare
Inter-county titles
- Leinster titles: 3
- All-Irelands: 2

Lawrence Cribbin (27 August 1880 – 15 October 1962) was an Irish Gaelic footballer who played as a goalkeeper for the Kildare senior team.

Cribbin made his first appearance for the team during the 1901 championship and was a regular member of the starting fifteen until his retirement after the 1920 championship. During that time he won two All-Ireland medals and three Leinster medals. Cribbin was an All-Ireland runner-up on one occasion.

At club level, Cribbin won fourteen county club championship medals in both hurling and football with his home club of Clane.
