= 1888 Dublin Senior Hurling Championship =

Annual hurling competition season

- Champions: Kickhams (1st title)
- Runners-up: Dunleary

The 1888 Dublin Senior Hurling Championship was the second staging of the Dublin Senior Hurling Championship since its establishment by the Dublin County Board.

Metropolitans entered the championship as the defending chammpions.

The final was played on 27 May 1888 at Clonturk Park in Dublin, between Kickhams and Dunleary, in what was their first ever meeting in the final. Kickhams won the match by 2–06 to 1–02 to claim their first ever championship title.

== Results ==
=== Final ===
27 May 1888 Final	Kickhams	2-06 - 1-02	Dunleary	Clonturk Park
