= Jim Power (Gaelic footballer) =

Irish Gaelic footballer

Personal information
- Native name: Séamus de Paor (Irish)
- Born: Shanballymore, County Cork, Ireland

Sport
- Sport: Gaelic Football
- Position: Centre-forward
Club
- Years: Club
- Midleton
Club titles
- Cork titles: 2
Inter-county*
Years	County	Apps (scores)
1889-1892	Cork	7
Inter-county titles
- Munster titles: 1
- All-Irelands: 1
- *Inter County team apps and scores correct as of 20:48, 28 April 2012.

James Power was an Irish Gaelic footballer who played as a centre-forward for the Cork senior team.

Power made his first appearance for the team during the 1889 championship and was a regular member of the starting fifteen for the next two seasons. During that time he won one All-Ireland medal and one Munster medal. In 1890 Power captained the team to the All-Ireland title.

At club level Power was a double county championship medalist with Midleton.

Sporting positions
Preceded by William Daly	Cork Senior Football Captain; 1889-1890	Succeeded by Con O'Leary
Achievements
Preceded by Gil Kavanagh (Tipperary)	All-Ireland Senior Football Final winning captain 1890	Succeeded by John Kennedy (Dublin)
