= 1908 All-Ireland Senior Football Championship =

Football championship

All-Ireland Champions
- Winning team: Dublin (11th win)
- Captain: Dave Kelleher

All-Ireland Finalists
- Losing team: London

Provincial Champions
- Munster: Kerry
- Leinster: Dublin
- Ulster: Antrim
- Connacht: Mayo

Championship statistics

The 1908 All-Ireland Senior Football Championship was the 22nd staging of Ireland's premier Gaelic football knock-out competition. Dublin won their eleventh All-Ireland title.

== Format ==
The four provincial championships were played as usual; the four champions joined London in the All-Ireland championship.

== Results ==
=== Connacht ===
Connacht Senior Football Championship

3 May 1908
Quarter-Final

Leitrim	0–1 – 0–5	Sligo

Mohill

27 September 1908
Semi-Final

Mayo	1–6 – 1–3	Sligo

Sligo

1908
Semi-Final

Roscommon	W – L	Galway

31 January 1909
Final

Mayo	2–5 – 0–4	Roscommon

Tuam

=== Leinster ===
Leinster Senior Football Championship

1908
Quarter-Final

Laois	2–9 – 0–9	Wexford

1908
Quarter-Final

Louth	2–7 – 1–10	Kilkenny

Jones Road

1908
Quarter-Final

Louth	0–11 – 0–6	Kilkenny

Jones Road

1908
Quarter-Final

Dublin	0–0 – 0–0	Meath

Jones Road

1908
Quarter-Final Replay

Dublin	1–9 – 0–1	Meath

Jones Road

11 October 1908
Quarter-Final

Offaly	0–0 – 0–0	Kildare

Jones Road

1 November 1908
Quarter-Final Replay

Offaly	0–1 – 2–13	Kildare

Jones Road
Referee: D McCarthy

1908
Semi-Final

Dublin	0–13 – 0–7	Laois

Jones Road

15 November 1908
Semi-Final

Louth	0–5 – 0–5	Kildare

Jones Road

29 November 1908
Semi-Final Replay

Louth	1–5 – 1–6	Kildare

Jones Road

13 December 1908
Final

Dublin	1–7 – 0–3	Kildare

Athy
Attendance: 4,000

=== Munster ===
Munster Senior Football Championship

2 August 1908
Quarter-Final

Cork	0–16 – 0–3	Limerick

Ennis

27 September 1908
Quarter-Final

Waterford	0–13 – 2–4	Tipperary

Fermoy
Referee: D. Rounghan (L)

26 July 1908
Semi-Final

Kerry	1–8 – 0–3	Clare

Listowel

18 October 1908
Semi-Final

Cork	1–5 – 1–7	Waterford

Mallow

6 December 1908
Final

Kerry	0–7 – 0–2	Waterford

Cork Athletic Grounds

=== Ulster ===
Ulster Senior Football Championship

1 November 1908
Final

Cavan	0–3 – 0–2	Antrim

Newbliss

An objection was made and a replay ordered.

13 December 1908
Final Replay

Cavan	2–4 – 0–4	Antrim

Castleblayney

=== Semi-finals ===
14 February 1909
Home Semi-Final

Kerry	2–4 – 0–1 Unfinished	Mayo

Limerick

21 February 1909
Home Semi-Final

Dublin	1–8 – 0–2	Antrim

Jones' Road, Dublin

=== Final ===
9 May 1909
Home Final

Dublin	0–10 – 0–3	Kerry

Thurles

3 October 1909
Final

Dublin	1–10 – 0–4	London

Jones' Road, Dublin
Attendance: 10,000
Referee: M Conroy (Dublin)

== Statistics ==
=== Miscellaneous ===
- Dublin win a 10th All Ireland in 17 years a 2nd 3 in a row in history.

== Roll of Honour ==
- Dublin – 11 (1908)
- Tipperary – 3 (1900)
- Kerry – 2 (1904)
- Limerick – 2 (1896)
- Kildare – 1 (1905)
- Cork – 1 (1890)
- Wexford – 1 (1893)
