= 1890 All-Ireland Senior Football Championship =

Football championship

All-Ireland Champions
- Winning team: Cork (1st win)
- Captain: Jim Power

All-Ireland Finalists
- Losing team: Wexford

Provincial Champions
- Munster: Cork
- Leinster: Wexford
- Ulster: Armagh
- Connacht: Galway

Championship statistics

The 1890 All-Ireland Senior Football Championship was the fourth staging of Ireland's premier Gaelic football knock-out competition. Previous years All Ireland champions Tipperary didn't take part in the Munster championship cancelled game against Clare. Cork were the champions.

== Representative clubs ==
From 1887 until 1891 the club champions represented the whole county.

County	Club
Armagh	Armagh Harps
Cork	Midleton
Dublin	Isle of the Sea
Galway	
Kerry	Laune Rangers GAA
Limerick	St. Patricks
Tyrone	
Wexford	Blues & Whites

== Results ==
=== Connacht ===
Galway were the only entrants, so they received a bye to the All-Ireland semi-final.

=== Munster ===
3 August 1890
Quarter-Final

Clare	0–0 – 0–0	Tipperary

Limerick

3 August 1890
Quarter-Final

Kerry	0–9 – 0–0	Limerick

Tralee

17 August 1890
Semi-Final

Cork	0–6 – 0–0	Waterford

Youghal

14 September 1890
Semi-Final

Kerry	w/o – scr.	Clare

Market's Field

28 September 1890
Final

Cork	0–0 – 0–0 Unfinished. The ball burst after 57mins of play	Kerry

Raheen, Limerick

19 October 1890
Final Replay

Cork	1–4 – 0–1	Kerry

Banteer

=== Leinster ===
1890
Quarter-Final

Dublin	6–11 – 0–2	Westmeath

Clonturk

1890
Quarter-Final

Wexford	0–2 – 0–2	Kilkenny

Waterford

1890
Quarter-Final Replay

Wexford	0–0 – 0–0	Kildare

Clonturk

9 November 1890
Quarter-Final

Laois	0–5 – 0–0	Kildare

Clonturk

19 October 1890
Semi-Final

Laois	0–1 – 2–8	Dublin

Clonturk
Referee: T Lee (Dublin)

19 October 1890
Semi-Final

Wexford	0–3 – 0–2	Louth

Clonturk

2 November 1890
Final

Wexford	1–3 – 1–2	Dublin

Clonturk

=== Ulster ===
17 August 1890
Semi-final

Armagh	3–7 – 0–1	Antrim

Armagh
Referee: James Weldon

12 October 1890
Final

Armagh	2–8 – 1–2	Tyrone

Blaris, Lisburn

=== Semi-finals ===
16 November 1890
Semi-Final

Cork	1–15 – 0–0	Armagh

Clonturk

1890
Semi-Final

Wexford	w/o – scr.	Galway

=== Final ===
26 June 1892

Cork	2–4 – 0–1	Wexford

Clonturk
Attendance: 1,000
Referee: J. J. Kenny (Dublin)

== Statistics ==
- Cork won both the Munster and All-Ireland titles for the first time. The county was Double All-Ireland champion in both football and hurling; it happened again 100 years later, in 1990.
