= 1908 All-Ireland Senior Hurling Championship =

All-Ireland champions
- Winning team: Tipperary (8th win)
- Captain: Tom Semple

All-Ireland Finalists
- Losing team: Dublin
- Captain: Jack Grace

Provincial champions
- Munster: Tipperary
- Leinster: Dublin
- Ulster: Derry
- Connacht: Galway

Championship statistics
- All-Star Team: See here

The All-Ireland Senior Hurling Championship 1908 was the 22nd series of the All-Ireland Senior Hurling Championship, Ireland's premier hurling knock-out competition. Tipperary won the championship, beating Dublin 3–15 to 1–5 in a replay of the final.

== Format ==
All-Ireland Championship

Semi-finals: (2 matches) The four provincial representatives made up the semi-final pairings. Two teams are eliminated at this stage while the two winning teams advance to the All-Ireland final.

Final: (1 match) The winners of the two semi-finals contest this game with the winners being declared All-Ireland champions.

== Results ==
=== Connacht Senior Hurling Championship ===
31 January 1909
Final

Galway	3–5 – 1–2	Roscommon

Tuam

=== Leinster Senior Hurling Championship ===
7 March 1909
Final

Dublin	w/o – scr.	Kilkenny

Jones' Road, Dublin

Kilkenny refused to play due a dispute over the Railway Shield.

=== Munster Senior Hurling Championship ===
Final

Tipperary	w/o – scr.	Kerry

=== Ulster Senior Hurling Championship ===
Semi-final

Cavan	3–6 – 0–3	Fermanagh

Final

Derry	2–8 – 0–2	Cavan

=== All-Ireland Senior Hurling Championship ===
14 February 1909
Semi-final

Tipperary	5–15 – 1–0	Galway

Markets Field, Limerick

21 February 1909
Semi-final

Dublin	4–12 – 0–3	Cavan

Jones's Road, Dublin

25 April 1909
Final

Tipperary	2–5 – 1–8	Dublin

Jones's Road, Dublin

27 June 1909
Final replay

Tipperary	3–15 – 1–5	Dublin

Athy

== Sources ==
- Corry, Eoghan, The GAA Book of Lists (Hodder Headline Ireland, 2005).
- Donegan, Des, The Complete Handbook of Gaelic Games (DBA Publications Limited, 2005).
