= Owen Markey =

Irish Gaelic footballer

Personal information
- Native name: Eoghan Ó Marcaigh (Irish)
- Born: Eugene Markey; 11 July 1883 Ardee, County Louth, Ireland
- Died: 7 November 1968 (aged 85) Ardee, County Louth, Ireland
- Occupation: Labourer

Sport
- Sport: Gaelic football
Clubs
- Years: Club
- Ardee Volunteers; Ardee St Mochta's; Éamonn Ceannt's (Ardee)
Club titles
- Louth titles: 2
Inter-county
- Years: County
- 1903-1923: Louth
Inter-county titles
- Leinster titles: 3
- All-Irelands: 2

Eugene "Owen" Markey (11 July 1883 – 7 November 1968) was an Irish Gaelic footballer. His championship career with the Louth senior team spanned twenty years from 1903 until 1923.

== Honours ==
Ardee Volunteers

- Louth Senior Football Championship (1): 1903

Ardee St Mochta's

- Louth Senior Football Championship (1): 1914

Louth

- All-Ireland Senior Football Championship (2): 1910, 1912
- Leinster Senior Football Championship (3): 1909, 1910, 1912

Éamonn Ceannt's

- Louth Senior Football Championship Runner-Up (1): 1921
