= 1907 All-Ireland Senior Football Championship =

Football championship

All-Ireland Champions
- Winning team: Dublin (10th win)
- Captain: Jack Grace

All-Ireland Finalists
- Losing team: Cork

Provincial Champions
- Munster: Cork
- Leinster: Dublin
- Ulster: Monaghan
- Connacht: Mayo

Championship statistics

The 1907 All-Ireland Senior Football Championship was the 21st staging of Ireland's premier Gaelic football knock-out competition. Dublin won their tenth All-Ireland title.

== Format ==
The four provincial championships were played as usual; the four champions joined London in the All-Ireland championship.

== Results ==
=== Connacht ===
Connacht Senior Football Championship

21 April 1907
Quarter-Final

Roscommon	3–6 – 1–3	Sligo

Ballaghadereen

3 May 1907
Semi-Final

Roscommon	0–3 – 0–1	Leitrim

Mohill

12 July 1908
Semi-Final

Mayo	3–6 – 0–1	Galway

Tuam

26 May 1908
Final

Mayo	2–13 – 0–5	Roscommon

Tuam

=== Leinster ===
Leinster Senior Football Championship

1907
Preliminary Round

Westmeath	0–0 – 0–0	Kilkenny

Jones Road, Dublin

1907
Preliminary Round

Meath	1–9 – 1–5	Kilkenny

Jones Road, Dublin

1907
Preliminary Round

Louth	1–17 – 0–5	Wicklow

8 December 1907
Quarter-Final

Offaly	1–17 – 0–2	Wexford

Jones Road, Dublin

8 December 1907
Quarter-Final

Dublin	0–11 – 0–7	Kildare

Jones Road, Dublin

1907
Quarter-Final

Louth	1–3 – 0–5	Meath

Jones Road, Dublin

An objection was made and a replay ordered.

1907
Quarter-Final Replay

Louth	7–3 – 2–8	Meath

Jones Road, Dublin

1907
Semi-Final

Dublin	0–2 – 1–8	Louth

Dundalk

An objection was made and a replay ordered.

1907
Semi-Final Replay

Dublin	2–6 – 0–6	Louth

Jones Road, Dublin

5 April 1908
Semi-Final

Meath	0–4 – 1–6	Offaly

Jones Road, Dublin
Referee: S Wall

26 April 1908
Final

Dublin	1–11 – 0–4	Offaly

Athy

=== Munster ===
Munster Senior Football Championship

8 December 1907
Quarter-Final

Cork	2–5 – 0–2	Limerick

Limerick

15 March 1908
Quarter-Final

Kerry	4–6 – 0–2	Clare

Market's Field, Limerick

29 March 1908
Semi-Final

Cork	1–9 – 0–6	Kerry

Market's Field, Limerick

29 March 1908
Semi-Final

Tipperary	1–14 – 0–3	Waterford

Carrick-on-Suir

26 April 1908
Final

Cork	1–7 – 1–1	Tipperary

Dungarvan
Referee: P. Naughton (L)

=== Ulster ===
Ulster Senior Football Championship

25 December 1907
Quarter-Final

Antrim	0–4 – 0–4	Down

Newry

26 January 1908
Quarter-Final

Fermanagh	W – L	Monaghan

Clones

2 February 1908
Quarter-Final Replay

Antrim	0–9 – 0–5	Down

Newry

16 February 1908
Quarter-Final

Cavan	W – L	Tyrone

Newbliss

6 June 1908
Semi-Final

Antrim	0–12 – 0–6	Armagh

Armagh

21 June 1908
Semi-Final

Cavan	0–7 – 0–2	Fermanagh

Enniskillen

13 September 1908
Final

Antrim	1–8 – 0–4	Cavan

Clones

=== Quarter-final ===
10 May 1908
Quarter-Final

Cork	2–10 – 0–2 Unfinished	Mayo

Limerick

Match unfinished; Cork were awarded the game.

=== Semi-finals ===
15 March 1908
Semi-Final

Dublin	1–5 – 0–2	Monaghan

Jones' Road, Dublin

7 June 1908
Semi-Final

Cork	1–14 – 1–5	London

Cork

=== Final ===
5 July 1908
Final

Dublin	0–6 – 0–2	Cork

Tipperary
Attendance: 5,000
Referee: John Fitzgerald (Kildare)
