= 1909 All-Ireland Senior Football Championship =

Gaelic football competition

All-Ireland Champions
- Winning team: Kerry (3rd win)
- Captain: Tom Costelloe

All-Ireland Finalists
- Losing team: Louth
- Captain: Jack Carvin

Provincial Champions
- Munster: Kerry
- Leinster: Louth
- Ulster: Antrim
- Connacht: Mayo

Championship statistics

The 1909 All-Ireland Senior Football Championship was the 23rd staging of Ireland's premier Gaelic football knock-out competition. In the Leinster semi-final Louth ended Dublin's period as All Ireland champions. Kerry were the winners.

== Results ==
=== Connacht ===
Connacht Senior Football Championship

2 January 1910
Quarter-Final

Sligo	1–3 – 0–3	Leitrim

Carrick-on-Shannon

28 August 1910
Semi-Final

Sligo	1–7 – 2–5	Galway

Sligo

==== Final ====
30 October 1910
Final

Mayo	1–4 – 0–5	Galway

Ballina

=== Leinster ===
Leinster Senior Football Championship

1909
Quarter-Final

Laois	0–5 – 2–16	Kilkenny

Kilkenny

16 May 1909
Quarter-Final

Offaly	1–9 – 1–4	Kildare

Maryboro
Attendance: 1500

11 July 1909
Quarter-Final

Dublin	0–18 – 0–6	Wexford

11 July 1909
Quarter-Final

Louth	0–7 – 0–5	Meath

Navan
Attendance: 2,000

1909
Semi-Final

Louth	1–11 – 1–7	Dublin

Dundalk

1909
Semi-Final

Kildare	1–4 – 2–3	Kilkenny

Carlow

==== Final ====
24 October 1909

Louth	2–9 – 0–4	Kilkenny
J. Brennan 0–6, T. Matthews 1–1, J. Hanlon 1–0, J. Bannon 0–2

Jones' Road, Dublin
Attendance: 6,000
Referee: M.F. Crowe (Dublin)

1	Michael Byrne (Dundalk Young Irelands) (gk)
2	John Clarke (Tredaghs)
3	Jimmy Quinn (Tredaghs)
4	Joe Donnelly (Dundalk Young Irelands)
5	Joe Mulligan (Dundalk Young Irelands)
6	Jack Clarke (Tredaghs)
7	Eddie Burke (Tredaghs)
8	Jack Carvin (Tredaghs) (c)
9	Pat Burke (Tredaghs)
10	Jack Bannon (Tredaghs)
11	Tom Morgan (Tredaghs)
12	Pat Donegan (Tredaghs)
13	Michael Hand (Tredaghs)
14	Tom Matthews (Ardee Volunteers)
15	Eoin Markey (Ardee Volunteers)
16	Johnny Brennan (Dundalk Rangers)
17	Joe Hanlon (Dundalk Rangers)

1	D. Holohan (gk) (c)
2	P. Dalton
3	J. Dwyer
4	D. Dalton
5	B. Dwyer
6	J. Doyle
7	J. Galavan
8	T. Butler
9	J. Foskin
10	L. O'Neill
11	J. Donovan
12	P. O'Neill
13	J. Borris
14	D. Cass
15	D. Hoyne
16	M. Drea

=== Munster ===
Munster Senior Football Championship

1909
Quarter-Final

Limerick	0–12 – 0–9	Clare

Ennis

4 July 1909
Quarter-Final

Kerry	2–10 – 0–5	Tipperary

Fermoy
Referee: J. Fgan ( C )

11 July 1909
Semi-Final

Cork	2–7 – 0–3	Waterford

Dungarvan

1909
Semi-Final

Kerry	2–18 – 1–2	Limerick

Listowel

==== Finals ====
19 September 1909
Final

Kerry	2–8 – 1–7	Cork

Market's Field, Limerick

7 November 1909
Final Replay

Kerry	1–6 – 0–6	Cork

Cork Athletic Grounds

=== Ulster ===
Ulster Senior Football Championship

28 March 1909
Quarter-Final

Monaghan	Abandoned	Armagh

Castleblayney

1 August 1909
Quarter-Final Replay

Monaghan	1–7 – 0–3	Armagh

Castleblayney

22 August 1909
Quarter-Final

Fermanagh	2–4 – 1–6	Tyrone

Clones

29 August 1909
Quarter-Final

Cavan	W – L	Down

Newry

12 September 1909
Semi-Final

Antrim	0–10 – 0–6	Monaghan

Clones

17 October 1909
Semi-Final

Cavan	0–6 – 0–1	Fermanagh

Belturbet

==== Final ====
28 November 1909
Final

Antrim	1–9 – 0–5	Cavan

Clones

=== Semi-finals ===
10 October 1909
Semi-Final

Louth	2–13 – 0–15	Antrim

Shauns Park, Belfast

21 November 1909
Semi-Final

Kerry	2–12 – 0–6	Mayo

Ennis

=== Final ===
5 December 1909
Final

Kerry	1–9 – 0–6	Louth

Jones' Road, Dublin
Attendance: 16,000
Referee: M. F. Crowe (Dublin)

== Statistics ==
=== Miscellaneous ===
- 1909 was the GAA's 25th anniversary.
