= 1906 All-Ireland Senior Football Championship =

Football championship

All-Ireland Champions
- Winning team: Dublin (9th win)
- Captain: Jack Grace

All-Ireland Finalists
- Losing team: Cork

Provincial Champions
- Munster: Cork
- Leinster: Dublin
- Ulster: Monaghan
- Connacht: Mayo

Championship statistics

The 1906 All-Ireland Senior Football Championship was the 20th year of the Gaelic football competition. The competition was between the winners of the four provincial championships with Dublin as the All-Ireland champion for that year. In the Leinster final they ended Kildare's period as All Ireland champions.

== Results ==
=== Connacht ===
Connacht Senior Football Championship

3 February 1907
Quarter-Final

Roscommon	5–6 – 0–3	Leitrim

Longford

3 February 1907
Semi-Final

Mayo	1–9 – 0–1	Sligo

Claremorris

1907
Semi-Final

Galway	W – L	Roscommon

7 April 1907
Final

Mayo	2–16 – 0–1	Galway

Claremorris

=== Leinster ===
Leinster Senior Football Championship

1906
Quarter-Final

Louth	2–18 – 0–4	Laois

Jones' Road, Dublin

1906
Quarter-Final

Kildare	0–8 – 0–2	Meath

Jones' Road, Dublin

1906
Quarter-Final

Kilkenny	0–5 – 1–9	Dublin

Enniscorthy

31 March 1907
Quarter-Final

Offaly	0–6 – 1–6	Wexford

Jones' Road, Dublin

1907
Semi-Final

Louth	0–5 – 1–9	Dublin

Navan

28 April 1907
Semi-Final

Kildare	0–13 – 0–1	Wexford

Athy

7 July 1907
Final

Dublin	1–9 – 0–8	Kildare
Mick Madigan 1–1, Tommy Walsh 0–3 (0-2f), Hugh Hilliard 0–2, Jack Grace, Paddy Casey, Tom Quane 0–1 each		Jack Connolly and Mick Kennedy 0–2 each, Mick Fitzgerald, Bill Bracken, Bill Losty, Joyce Conlan 0–1 each

Kilkenny
Attendance: 5,000
Referee: John Kennedy (Wexford)

=== Munster ===
Munster Senior Football Championship

23 June 1907
Quarter-Final

Tipperary	0–6 – 0–6	Limerick

Cork
Referee: D. Roughan (Clare)

7 July 1907
Quarter-Final Replay

Tipperary	1–9 – 0–2	Limerick

Fermoy
Referee: W. Curtin (Cork)

12 May 1907
Quarter-Final

Kerry	2–8 – 0–1	Clare

Market's Field

19 May 1907
Semi-Final

Cork	2–7 – 1–2	Waterford

Dungarvan

21 July 1907
Semi-Final

Kerry	0–7 – 0–3	Tipperary

Market's Field
Referee: W. Curtin (Cork)

18 August 1907
Final

Cork	1–10 – 0–3	Kerry

Tipperary

=== Ulster ===
Ulster Senior Football Championship

28 April 1907
Quarter-Final

Monaghan	2–4 – 0–5	Cavan

Cootehill
Attendance: 7,000

6 May 1907
Preliminary Round

Down	1–6 – 0–4	Armagh

Newry
Attendance: 5,000

14 June 1907
Quarter-Final

Antrim	1–8 – 0–9	Down

Newry

21 June 1907
Quarter-Final

Derry	0–18 – 0–2	Donegal

7 July 1907
Semi-Final

Monaghan	0–10 – 1–4	Fermanagh

Newbliss

18 August 1907
Semi-Final

Antrim	1–14 – 0–4	Derry

Belfast

13 September 1907
Final

Monaghan	2–10 – 1–2	Antrim

Clones

=== Quarter-final ===
Because the Leinster championship was still underway when the quarter-final was to be played, Kildare was nominated to represent Leinster. When Dublin beat Kildare in the Leinster final, they were declared the champions.

19 May 1907
Quarter-Final

Kildare	2–1 – 1–3	Monaghan

Shauns Park, Belfast

=== Semi-finals ===
4 August 1907
Semi-Final

Dublin	2–7 – 0–3	London

Wexford

8 September 1907
Semi-Final

Cork	0–10 – 0–6	Mayo

Limerick

=== Final ===
20 October 1907
Final

Dublin	0–5 – 0–4	Cork

Geraldine Park, Athy
Attendance: 8,000
Referee: John Fitzgerald (Kildare)

== Statistics ==
=== Miscellaneous ===
- For the 1st time All 5 counties played in the Connacht championship.
