= 2011 Dublin Senior Football Championship =

- 2011 Craobh Sinsear Peile; Bhaile Átha Cliath

Tournament details
- County: Dublin
- Year: 2011

Winners
- Champions: St Brigid's (2nd win)
- Manager: Gerry McEntee/ Mark Byrne
- Captain: Shane Supple

Promotion/Relegation
- Promoted team(s): Skerries Harps
- Relegated team(s): Fingallians

The 2011 Dublin Senior Football Championship is the inter club Gaelic football competition between the top teams in Dublin GAA. There are currently 8 teams remaining in contention for the Dublin Championship.

== First round ==
The winners of the first round progressed to the second round, the losers went on to a backdoor round with a chance to progress to the second round.

| 26 April; Round One | UCD | 3–16 – 0–05 | St Pats Palmerstown | Iveagh Grounds; Referee: B O'Shea (St Mark's). |
| 26 April; Round One | C Carthy 1–3 (0-3f), M O'Hanlon 1–1, D Kingston (0-3f), J Heslin, L Smith 0–3 each, E Tiernan 1–0, L Keaney 0–2, C Boyle 0–1. | Report | P Faughnan 0–3 (2f), B Carson, D Farren 0–1 each. | Iveagh Grounds; Referee: B O'Shea (St Mark's). |

| 27 April; Round One | Erins Isle | 3–16 – 0–05 | Naomh Mearnóg | Cloghran; Referee: D Deasy (Ballymun Kickhams). |
| 27 April; Round One | D Fegan 1–1, J Noonan 0–3, N Crossan 0–2 (0-1f), K Nicholson, A Whelan 0–1 each. | Report | J Walsh 0–3 (0-2f), A Sheppard (0-1f), D Barry 0–2 each, K O'Brien, S Kenny, M Gibbs, A Kenny 0–1 each. | Cloghran; Referee: D Deasy (Ballymun Kickhams). |

| 29 April; Round One | Kilmacud Crokes* | (Cancelled) | St Marys |
| 29 April; Round One | | Report |

| 28 April; Round One | Trinity Gaels | 2–14 – 3–10 | O'Tooles | Parnell Park; Referee: F Shanahan (St Margaret's). |
| 28 April; Round One | B O'Brien 1–7 (1–0 pen, 0-6f), E McInerney 1–1, G Dillon 0–3, D Kelly 0–2 (0-1f), J McCann 0–1. | Report | A Morris, A King 1–1 each, D Farrelly 1–0, M Healy 0–3 (0-2f), G O'Meara 0–2, D Mooney, B McLoughlin, P Brennan 0–1 each. | Parnell Park; Referee: F Shanahan (St Margaret's). |

| 29 April; Round One | Na Fianna | 1–13 – 0–10 | Raheny | Alfie Byrne Road; Referee: A McAllister (Starlights). |
| 29 April; Round One | D Quinn 1–2, P Quinn 0–3 (0-1f), C Duignan (0-1f), A Caffrey 0–2 each, J McGurk, C O'Connor, S Coughlan, K Gormley 0–1 each. | Report | E Delaney 0–4 (0-1f), D Henry 0–2 (0-1f), E Keogh (0–1 '45'), N O'Sullivan, C Hanley, C Woods 0–1 each. | Alfie Byrne Road; Referee: A McAllister (Starlights). |

| 29 April; Round One | Round Towers (C) | 3–09 – 1–10 | Clontarf | Islandbridge (Civil Service Grounds); Referee: P Fitzsimons (Liffey Gaels). |
| 29 April; Round One | C Carty 1–4 (0-1f), J Joyce 1–1, S McGibney 1–0, B Gallagher 0–2 (0-2f), D Whelan, P Clifford 0–1 each | Report | S Harkin 1–3, I O'Dwyer 0–3, R McHugh, G Johnson, D Mullins, K McGrath 0–1 each. | Islandbridge (Civil Service Grounds); Referee: P Fitzsimons (Liffey Gaels). |

| 29 April; Round One | Ballyboden St Enda's | 0–14 – 2–13 | Thomas Davis | O'Toole Park; Referee: K Tighe (St Anne's). |
| 29 April; Round One | A Kerin 0–6 (0-4f), K Naughton 0–3 (0-2f), S Gibbons 0–2, D Davey, P Galvin, D O'Mahony 0–1 each. | Report | J O'Connor, S McGrath 1–1, P Hudson 0–4 (0-1f), S Smith, E Kirby 0–2, D Shanahan, S Reilly, C Farrelly 0–1 each. | O'Toole Park; Referee: K Tighe (St Anne's). |

| 29 April; Round One | Ballymun Kickhams | 0–10 – 1–13 | St Sylvester's | Parnell Park; Referee: G McCormack (Naomh Barrog). |
| 29 April; Round One | E Christie 0–6 (0-6f), D Byrne 0–3, K Leahy 0–1 (0–1 '45'). | Report | M McCarthy 1–4 (0-2f), D Clarke 0–4 (2f), N Dunne 0–3, C Hanratty, R Cleere 0–1 each. | Parnell Park; Referee: G McCormack (Naomh Barrog). |

| 29 April; Round One | St Peregrine's | 1–18 – 1–12 | Lucan Sarsfields | Russell Park; Referee: S Kavanagh (St Brigid's). |
| 29 April; Round One | R McCarthy 0–9 (0-3f), C Lowndes 1–2, S Lowndes 0–3, C McGuinness 0–2, E Jennings (0-1f), C Foley 0–1 each. | Report | J O'Neill 0–5, S Gorbutt 1–0, T Brennan 0–3 (0-1f), B Gallagher 0–2, B O'Neill, D Quinn 0–1 each. | Russell Park; Referee: S Kavanagh (St Brigid's). |

| 30 April; Round One | Fingallians | 2–17 – 1–14 | St Maur's | Naul; Referee: G Owen McMahon (O'Dwyer's). |
| 30 April; Round One | C McLoughlin 0–5 (0-4f), P Flynn 1–0, D Killeen 0–3 (0-2f), G Donnelly, D Farrell 0–2 each, B Clarke, M Hanley 0–1 each. | Report | C Carthy 1–8 (0-6f), M McGrath 0–4, C McGuire 1–1, D Byrne 0–2, C Moore, C Reddin 0–1 each. | Naul; Referee: G Owen McMahon (O'Dwyer's). |

| 29 April; Round One | St Brigid's | 0–13 – 0–12 | Templeogue Synge St | Iveagh Grounds; Referee: P Kiernan (St Olaf's). |
| 29 April; Round One | B Cahill 0–3, Mark Cahill (0-2f), K Darcy (0-1f), P Andrews, L McCarthy, 0–2 each, P Ryan 0–1. | Report | D Treanor 0–5 (0-1f), F O'Gara 0–3, F Coffey, G Vickery 0–2 each, A O'Brien 0–1. | Iveagh Grounds; Referee: P Kiernan (St Olaf's). |

| 29 April; Round One | Ballinteer St John's | 1–17 – 1–07 | St Mark's | O'Toole Park; Referee: J Fagan (Erin's Isle). |
| 29 April; Round One | S O'Reilly 0–6 (0-3f), J McNally 0–5 (0-4f), S McCann 1–0, S O'Connor, P O'Connor 0–2, P O'Curry, N Devereux 0–1 each. | Report | B Kennedy 0–4 (0-1f), J Kelly 1–0, B Walsh, P Murphy, G Kramer 0–1 each. | O'Toole Park; Referee: J Fagan (Erin's Isle). |

| 29 April; Round One | St Jude's | 0–12 – 1–12 | St Anne's | O'Toole's; Referee: J Rutherford (Ballyboden St Enda's). |
| 29 April; Round One | D Gallagher 0–4 (0-1f), D Donnelly, K McManamon 0–3, S Gallagher, P Cunningham 0–1 each. | Report | M O'Driscoll 0–6 (0-4f), S Fulham 1–2 (1–0 pen), T Connolly 0–2, C McKeown, C Brady 0–1 each. | O'Toole's; Referee: J Rutherford (Ballyboden St Enda's). |

| 30 April; Round One | Whitehall Colmcille | 1–14 – 0–04 | Parnell's | Parnell Park; Referee: R Malone (St Mary's, Saggart). |
| 30 April; Round One | C O'Connor (0–1 '45'), A Holly, S Walsh, S Ryan (f) 0–1 each. | Report | J Murtagh 0–6 (0-2f), MJ Tierney 1–2 (0-1f), M Gleeson 0–3, A Doyle, C Begley, J Dignam 0–1 each. | Parnell Park; Referee: R Malone (St Mary's, Saggart). |

| 30 April; Round One | St Oliver Plunkett's/ER | 2–10 – 1–11 | St Vincent's | Parnell Park; Referee: J Murray (Castleknock). |
| 30 April; Round One | A Brogan 0–5 (0-2f), C Daly, J Sherlock 1–0 each, S Dunne 0–2, C Dunleavy, G Smith, P Houlihan 0–1 each. | Report | T Quinn 0–5 (0-5f), D Connolly 1–1, S Carthy 0–3, E Fennell 0–2. | Parnell Park; Referee: J Murray (Castleknock). |

| 2 May; Round One Replay | Erin's Isle | 0–12 – 1–07 | Naomh Mearnóg | Rolestown; Referee: B Carroll (Fingal Ravens). |
| 2 May; Round One Replay | N Crossan 0–8 (5f), D Fox, C Flynn (1f), C Mac Aodhán, S McCoy 0–1 each. | Report | A Sheppard 0–5 (3f), K O'Brien 1–1 (1–0 pen), D Barry 0–1. | Rolestown; Referee: B Carroll (Fingal Ravens). |

- Kilmacud Crokes progress to the next round.

== Second round ==
The winners of the first-round games are tied together in a winners section of the second round. The losers of the winners section go on to the third round and the winners progress to the fourth round. The losers of the first round are tied in a losers section of the second round. The losers of the losers section go on to the relegation championship and the winners progress to the third round to play against the losers of the winners section.

| 3 May; Second Round Winners Section | UCD | 0–11 – 1–06 | Fingals Ravens | Páirc Naomh Uinsionn; Referee: J. Fagan (Erin's Isle). |
| 3 May; Second Round Winners Section | D Kingston 0–4 (3f), M O'Hanlon, T Warburton 0–2 each, J Heslin, D Larkin, C Kenny 0–1 each. | Report | W Finnegan 0–3 (0-2f, 0–1 pen), M Flanagan 1–0, D Daly, N Tormey, A Casey 0–1 each. | Páirc Naomh Uinsionn; Referee: J. Fagan (Erin's Isle). |

| 5 May; Second Round Winners Section | St Maurs | 1–12 – 0–14 | Na Fianna | Drumnigh; Referee: D Deasy (Ballymun Kickhams). |
| 5 May; Second Round Winners Section | C Carthy 0–7 (0-3f), C Maguire 1–0, M McGrath, C Moore 0–2 each, R Maguire 0–1. | Report | P Quinn 0–4 (0-2f), A Caffrey (0-1f), C Duignan (0–2 '45s') 0–3 each, C O'Connor, D Quinn (0-1f) 0–2 each. | Drumnigh; Referee: D Deasy (Ballymun Kickhams). |

| 5 May; Second Round Winners Section | Kilmacud Crokes | 2–13 – 1–09 | St Marys | Parnell Park; Referee: D Feeney (Parnell's). |
| 5 May; Second Round Winners Section | P Burke 2–3 (1-0f), D Kelleher, R Cosgrove (0-3f), B Kavanagh (0-1f) 0–3 each, A Morrissey 0–1. | Report | D Marshall 0–6 (0-4f), E Murray 1–1 (0-1f), B Kelly 0–2. | Parnell Park; Referee: D Feeney (Parnell's). |

| 6 May; Second Round Losers Section | St Marks | 1–04 – 2–14 | St Brigids | O'Toole Park; Referee: P Fitzsimons (Liffey Gaels). |
| 6 May; Second Round Losers Section | B Redmond 1–0, J Kelly, B Kennedy 0–2 each. | Report | P Andrews 1–3, D Lally, P Ryan 0–3 each, K Darcy 1–0, M Cahill 0–2 (0-2f), B Cahill, L McCarthy (0-1f), D O'Connor 0–1 each. | O'Toole Park; Referee: P Fitzsimons (Liffey Gaels). |

| 7 May; Second Round Winners Section | Ballinteer St Johns | 2–04 – 1–13 | Templeogue Synge Street | Referee: K Tighe (St Anne's). |
| 7 May; Second Round Winners Section | G Vickery 0–4; D O'Reilly 1–0; A O'Brien (0-1f); B McKiernan, D Treanor (1f) 0–2, E McKiernan, M Cannon, T Hourican 0–1 each | Report | J McNally 1–4 (1–0 pen, 0-4f), C McCabe 1–0. | Referee: K Tighe (St Anne's). |

| 7 May; Second Round Winners Section | St Annes | 1–14 – 2–14 | St Peregrines | O'Toole Park; Referee: N Cocoman (St Oliver Plunkett's/E Ruadh). |
| 7 May; Second Round Winners Section | M O'Driscoll 0–8 (7f), S Fulham 1–2, T Connolly 0–2, A Doran, C O'Gara 0–1 each. | Report | R McCarthy 1–7 (0-3f), S Lowndes 1–2 (1–0 pen, 0–1 '45'), C McGuinness 0–2 (1f), C Foley, C Lowndes, C O'Hara 0–1 each. | O'Toole Park; Referee: N Cocoman (St Oliver Plunkett's/E Ruadh). |

| 7 May; Second Round Losers Section | O'Tooles | 2–13 – 0–12 | Clontarf | Balgriffin; Referee: F Shanahan (St Margaret's). |
| 7 May; Second Round Losers Section | A King 1–1, C Sexton 1–0, D Mooney 0–3, A Morris 0–3, M Healy 0–3 (3f), D Farrelly 0–2, P Carton 0–1. | Report | I O'Dwyer 0–5 (2f), P Syron 0–4 (1f), D Mullins 0–2, R McHugh 0–1. | Balgriffin; Referee: F Shanahan (St Margaret's). |

| 7 May; Second Round Losers Section | Whitehall Colmcille | 0–06 – 2–18 | Ballymun Kickhams | St Margaret's; Referee: B Tiernan (O'Dwyer's). |
| 7 May; Second Round Losers Section | L O'Donovan 0–5 (0-2f, 0–1 '45'), S Ryan 0–1 (0-1f). | Report | E Christie 1–5 (0-3f), A Hubbard, 1–2, K Leahy 0–3, J Burke, Derek Byrne 0–2 each, E Dolan, K Connolly, J McCarthy, P McMahon 0–1 each | St Margaret's; Referee: B Tiernan (O'Dwyer's). |

| 7 May; Second Round Losers Section | St Judes | 0–11 – 1–10 | Lucan Sarsfields | O'Toole Park; Referee: B Carroll (Fingal Ravens). |
| 7 May; Second Round Losers Section | K McManamon 0–3 (0-1f), S Gallagher (1f), D Sutcliffe, D Gallagher (1f) 0–2 each, N Cronin, J Donnelly 0–1 each. | Report | T Brennan 0–5 (0-3f), B Gallagher 1–1 (0-1f), J O'Neill 0–2 (0-1f), S Garbutt, A Kirwan 0–1 each. | O'Toole Park; Referee: B Carroll (Fingal Ravens). |

| 7 May; Second Round Winners Section | St Oliver Plunketts | 0–17 – 1–07 | Erins Isle | Parnell Park; Referee: G. McCormack |
| 7 May; Second Round Winners Section | A Brogan 0–8 (0-4f), J Sherlock 0–3, G Smith 0–2 (0-1f, 0–1 '45'), C Dunleavy, C Walsh, S Dunne, C Daly 0–1 each. | Report | C Mac Aoghain 1–1, N Crossan 0–3 (0-3f), P Murray, A Whelan, J Noonan (0–1 '45') 0–1 each. | Parnell Park; Referee: G. McCormack |

| 7 May; Second Round Winners Section | Parnells | 0–12 – 1–13 | St Sylvesters | Parnell Park; Referee: R. Malone |
| 7 May; Second Round Winners Section | J Murtagh 0–5 (0-4f), MJ Tierney 0–3 (0-3f0, C Talty, N Collins 0–1 each. | Report | D Clarke 0–6 (0-2f), N Dunne 1–2, M McCarthy 0–3 (0-2f), G McArdle, R Cleere 0–1 each | Parnell Park; Referee: R. Malone |

| 8 May; Second Round Winners Section | Trinity Gaels | 1–12 – 1–13 | Round Towers (C) | Balgriffin; Referee: T McCarthy (St Vincent's). |
| 8 May; Second Round Winners Section | B O'Brien 1–4 (0-2f), D Kelly, J McCann 0–3 each, E McInerney, G Dillon 0–1 each. | Report | C Carthy 0–7 (0-2f), D Whelan 1–0, S Gibney, B Gallagher (0-2f) 0–2 each, J Joyce, M Taylor (0-1f) 0–1 each. | Balgriffin; Referee: T McCarthy (St Vincent's). |

| 8 May; Second Round Losers Section | Fingallians | 1–10 – 2–16 | Raheny | Balgriffin; Referee: A McAllister (Starlights). |
| 8 May; Second Round Losers Section | D Farrell 0–3, M Hanley 1–0 (1–0 pen), P Flynn, C McLoughlin (0-2f) 0–2 each, D Keane, B Clarke, D Sinnott 0–1 each. | Report | D Shatwell 1–2, E Delaney 0–5 (0-4f), C Woods 0–4 (0-3f), T O'Doinn 1–0, E Keogh, Stephen Swords, G Beaddie, D Henry, G Bennett 0–1 each. | Balgriffin; Referee: A McAllister (Starlights). |

| 8 May; Second Round Losers Section | St Vincents | 1–24 – 0–07 | Naomh Mearnóg | Blakestown Road; Referee: J Rutherford (Ballyboden St Enda's). |
| 8 May; Second Round Losers Section | T Quinn 0–8 (0-2f, 0–2 '45'), C Dorney 1–2, D Connolly 0–4, C Brady 0–3, S Byrne, S Lawlor 0–2 each, E Fennell, K Golden, N Mullins 0–1 each. | Report | A Sheppard 0–4 (0-3f), D Barry, M Gibbs, N Houlihan 0–1 each. | Blakestown Road; Referee: J Rutherford (Ballyboden St Enda's). |

| 10 June 2011; Second Round Winners Section | Kilmacud Crokes | 0–14 – 0–11 | Thomas Davis | O'Toole Park; Referee: N Cocoman (St Oliver Plunkett's/ER). |
| 10 June 2011; Second Round Winners Section | B Kavanagh 0–6 (0-5f), L Og O hEineachain 0–3, R Cosgrove 0–2, K Nolan, D Kelleher, P Burke 0–1 each. | Report | P Hudson 0–5 (0-3f), C Farrelly 0–4 (0-2f), E Kirby, S McGrath 0–1 each. | O'Toole Park; Referee: N Cocoman (St Oliver Plunkett's/ER). |

| 28 September 2011; Second Round Losers Section | Ballyboden St Endas | 1–11 – 0–08 | St Mary's | Parnell Park; Referee: D McKItterick (Fingallians). |
| 28 September 2011; Second Round Losers Section | A Kerin 1–6 (0–4), R Basquel 0–2 (0-2f), M O'Sullivan, D O'Reilly, S Gibbons 0–1 each. | Report | E Murray 0–3 (0-1f), D Marshall, B Kelly 0–2 each, A Marshall 0–1. | Parnell Park; Referee: D McKItterick (Fingallians). |

- Bye in 1st round Losers Section = St Patricks (P), which leaves them safe from relegation

== Third round ==
The third round comprises the losers of the winners section of the second round and also the winners of the losers section of the second round. Fingal Ravens, Ballinteer St Johns, St Annes, Erins Isle, Parnells, Trinity Gaels, Thomas Davis and Na Fianna will be taking part in the third round after losing their winners section clashes. St Brigids, O'Tooles, Lucan Sarsfields, St Vincents, Ballymun Kickhams, St Marys/Ballyboden St Enda's and Raheny will be taking part in the third round due to winning their second round losers section clashes. St Pats (P) got a bye to the third round. All third-round games will go into extra-time if the game is level at the end of sixty minutes. Trinity Gaels were knocked out at the third round, they will play their next championship game in the 2012 Championship.

| 1 October 2011; 17:30; Round Three | Lucan Sarsfields | 1–11 – 1–05 | St Annes | O'Toole Park; Referee: J Rutherford (Ballyboden St Enda's). |
| 1 October 2011; 17:30; Round Three | B Gallagher 1–4 (0-2f), T Brennan 0–3, P Casey, S Newcombe, D Quinn, S O'Shaughnessy 0–1 each. | Report | A Doran 1–0, M O'Driscoll 0–2 (2f), T Connolly (1f), S Fulham (1f), C Brady 0–1 each. | O'Toole Park; Referee: J Rutherford (Ballyboden St Enda's). |

| 1 October 2011; 15:45; Round Three | St Pat's, Palmerstown | 1–08 – 2–13 | Thomas Davis | O'Toole Park; Referee: S Finucane (Templeogue Synge Street). |
| 1 October 2011; 15:45; Round Three | P Faughnan 1–1, G Kelly 0–3, D Farren 0–2, C Driver, A Glennon 0–1 each. | Report | P Hudson (2f), S McGrath 0–4 each, S Reilly 1–1, C Farrelly 1–0, J O'Reilly 0–2, C Deasy (45), P O'Connor 0–1 each. | O'Toole Park; Referee: S Finucane (Templeogue Synge Street). |

| 2 October 2011; 14:15; Round Three | O'Tooles | 2–12 – 0–08 | Ballinteer St Johns | Balgriffin; Referee: B Tiernan (O'Dwyer's). |
| 2 October 2011; 14:15; Round Three | Paddy Carton 1–1, P Brennan 1–0, M Healy (3f), Peadar Carton 0–3 each, R Walker 0–2, G O'Meara, D Farrelly (f), R Bergin 0–1 each. | Report | J McNally (3f), P Corcoran 0–3 each, F Duffy, F Ward 0–1 each. | Balgriffin; Referee: B Tiernan (O'Dwyer's). |

| 30 September 2011; 20:15; Round Three | Trinity Gaels | 0–14 – 2–12 | St Vincents | Parnell Park; Referee: Gary McCormack (Naomh Barróg). |
| 30 September 2011; 20:15; Round Three | B O'Brien 0–6 (0-6f), D Kelly, G Dillon, C Reilly (0–2 45) 0–2 each, E McInerney, J McCann 0–1 each. | Report | T Quinn 1–9 (1–0 pen, 0-5f), M Concarr 1–0, D Connolly 0–2, C Dorney 0–1. | Parnell Park; Referee: Gary McCormack (Naomh Barróg). |

| 2 October 2011; Round 3 | Fingal Ravens | 0–12 – 0–12 (A.E.T.) | Ballyboden St Endas | Lawless Park; Referee: M Bissett (Whitehall Colmcille). |
| 2 October 2011; Round 3 | W Finnegan 0–6 (4f), A Casey 0–4 (3f), S Madigan, D Daly 0–1 each. | Report | D O'Mahony (4f), A Kerin (5f) 0–5 each, R Basquel, S Gibbons 0-1each. | Lawless Park; Referee: M Bissett (Whitehall Colmcille). |

| 1 October 2011; 17:30; Round Three | St Brigids | 0–14 0–11 | Na Fianna | Parnell Park; Referee: J Fagan (Erin's Isle). |
| 1 October 2011; 17:30; Round Three | K Darcy 0–3 (2f), Mark Cahill (2f), G McIntyre, L McCarthy (1 45) 0–2 each, A Daly, C Moran, G Kane, P Ryan, P Andrews 0–1 each. | Report | J Cooper, P Quinn (f) 0–3 each, D Quinn 0–2, N Cooper, M Jarocki, A Caffrey (f) 0–1 each. | Parnell Park; Referee: J Fagan (Erin's Isle). |

| 1 October 2011; 15:45; Round Three | Erins Isle | 0–07 – 3–13 | Ballymun Kickhams | Parnell Park; Referee: R Malone (St Mary's, Saggart). |
| 1 October 2011; 15:45; Round Three | J Noonan 0–3 (1f), N Crossan 0–2 (2f), A Browning, D Fegan 0–1 each. | Report | D Rock 0–6 (5f), K Leahy, C Weir, T Furman 1–0 each, Derek Byrne 0–2, A Hubbard, K Connolly, B McCullagh, E Reilly, K Doyle 0–1 each. | Parnell Park; Referee: R Malone (St Mary's, Saggart). |

| 2 October 2011; 16:00; Round Three | Parnells | 1–13 – 1–05 | Raheny | Parnell Park; Referee: Brian O'Shea (St MArks) |
| 2 October 2011; 16:00; Round Three | J Murtagh 0–9 (0-4f), J Peyton 0–3, A Doyle, MJ Tierney 0–1 (0-1f). | Report | D Shatwell 1–0, D Henry, C Woods, J Ryan, D O'Brien, E Delaney 0–1 each. | Parnell Park; Referee: Brian O'Shea (St MArks) |

| 11 October 2011; 19:30; Third Round Replay | Fingal Ravens | 0–13 – 2–10 | Ballyboden St. Enda's | Parnell Park; Referee: K Tighe (St Anne's). |
| 11 October 2011; 19:30; Third Round Replay | W Finnegan 0–7 (0-3f, 0–1 45), C Norton, D Kavanagh 0–2 each, I Kavanagh, A Casey (0-1f) 0–1 each. | Report | A Kerin 1–4 (1–0 pen, 0-1f), B Dwane 1–0, S Gibbons, D O'Mahony (0-1f) 0–2 each, P Galvin, MD Macauley 0–1 each. | Parnell Park; Referee: K Tighe (St Anne's). |

== Last Sixteen ==
The winners of the winners section of the second round qualify for this round, and will be paired against the winners of the third round fixtures. UCD, St Peregrines, Templeogue Synge Street, Kilmacud Crokes, St Oliver Plunketts, St Sylvesters, Round Towers (C), and St Maur's qualified for the last 16 by winning their second round winners section matches. St. Vincents, Thomas Davis, St. Brigid's, Ballymun Kickhams, Ballyboden St. Enda's, Parnells, O'Toole's and Lucan Sarsfields qualified by winning their third-round games. St. Maur's, O'Toole's, Kilmacud Crokes, Templeogue Synge Street, St. Peregrine's, UCD, St. Sylvester's and Round Towers, Clondalkin were knocked out during the fourth round, they will compete in the 2012 championship.

| 15 October 2011; 5:00; Last 16 | Lucan Sarsfields | 0–14 – 1–09 | Templeogue Synge Street | O'Toole Park; Referee: G McMahon (Kilmacud Crokes). |
| 15 October 2011; 5:00; Last 16 | T Brennan 0–4 (0-2f), M Twomey, J O'Neill, D Gallagher, B Gallagher (0-2f) 0–2 each, P Casey, S O'Shaughnessy 0–1 each. | Report | D Treanor 0–5 (0-3f), N Scully 1–1, A O'Brien 0–2, C Morley 0–1. | O'Toole Park; Referee: G McMahon (Kilmacud Crokes). |

| 13 October 2011; 8:15; Last 16 | Thomas Davis | 2–13 – 1–05 | St Maurs | Parnell Park; Referee: D Feeney (Parnells). |
| 13 October 2011; 8:15; Last 16 | S Smith 1–2, C Farrelly, P Hudson (2f) 0–4 each, J O'Reilly 1–0, E Kirby 0–2, S McGrath 0–1. | Report | R McGuire 1–0, C Reddin 0–2, L Fletcher, C Carty, C Moore 0–1 each. | Parnell Park; Referee: D Feeney (Parnells). |

| 15 October 2011; 3:30; Last 16 | O'Tooles | 0–07 – 1–14 | St Oliver Plunketts Eoghan Ruadh | Parnell Park; Referee: S McCarthy (St Vincent's). |
| 15 October 2011; 3:30; Last 16 | M Healy 0–4 (3f), D Mooney (45'), Peadar Carton, C Mulligan 0–1 each. | Report | B Brogan 1–7 (0-1f), G Smith 0–4 (1f), A Moyles, J Sherlock, S Dunne 0–1 each. | Parnell Park; Referee: S McCarthy (St Vincent's). |

| 16 October 2011; 3:45; Last 16 | St Vincents | 4–11 – 1–12 | UCD | O'Toole Park; Referee: B Carroll (Fingal Ravens). |
| 16 October 2011; 3:45; Last 16 | T Quinn (0-2f), D Connolly (0-1f, 0–1 45'), C Dorney 1–3, P Lee 1–1, S Carthy 0–1. | Report | C Kenny 1–3 (1–0 pen, 0-2f) N Kilroy 0–5 (0-f), C Kelly 0–2 (2f), D St Leger (f), M Brazil 0–1 each. | O'Toole Park; Referee: B Carroll (Fingal Ravens). |

| 16 October 2011; 3:45; Last 16 | Ballyboden St Endas | 2–19 – 0–04 | St Peregrines | Parnell Park; Referee: B O'Shea (St Mark's). |
| 16 October 2011; 3:45; Last 16 | A Kerin 1–3 (1–0 pen, 1f), D O'Mahony (0-1f) 1–2, S Gibbons, D Davey 0–3 each, R Basquel (1f) 0–2, B Dwane, P O'Brien, D Manley, D O'Reilly, C Hiney, P O'Connell 0–1 each. | Report | C Murtagh, C McGuinness (2f) 0–2 each. | Parnell Park; Referee: B O'Shea (St Mark's). |

| 15 October 2011; 5:00; Last 16 | St Brigids | 0–08 – 0–07 | Kilmacud Crokes | Parnell Park; Referee: T McCarthy (St Vincent's). |
| 15 October 2011; 5:00; Last 16 | K Darcy 0–4 (2f), J O'Loughlin, K Kilmurray, Mark Cahill (f), P Andrews 0–1 each. | Report | M Vaughan 0–5 (1f, 1 45'), B Kavanagh (f), B O'Rorke 0–1 each. | Parnell Park; Referee: T McCarthy (St Vincent's). |

| 12 October 2011; 7:30; Last 16 | Ballymun Kickhams | 4–17 – 0–04 | Round Towers, Clondalkin | Iveagh Grounds; Referee: S Finucane (Templeogue Synge Street). |
| 12 October 2011; 7:30; Last 16 | D Rock 0–10 (7f), Derek Byrne 2–3, K Connolly 1–1, E Christie 1–0, K Leahy 0–2, T Furman 0–1. | Report | D Whelan, L Connolly, I Ward, S Gibney 0–1 each. | Iveagh Grounds; Referee: S Finucane (Templeogue Synge Street). |

| 16 October 2011; 3:45; Last 16 | Parnells | 1–18 – 2–09 | St Sylvesters | Lawless Park; Referee: A McAllister (Starlights). |
| 16 October 2011; 3:45; Last 16 | J Murtagh 0–6 (4f), MJ Tierney 0–5 (4f), N Collins 1–1, R Quinlivan 0–3, A Doyle, D Rooney, M Gleeson 0–1 each. | Report | D Glennon, G Sweeney 1–0 each, N Dunne 0–3, M McCarthy 0–2, G McArdle, J Murphy, R Cleere, D Clarke (f) 0–1 each. | Lawless Park; Referee: A McAllister (Starlights). |

== Quarter-finals ==
Ballymun Kickhams, Thomas Davis, St. Brigid's, Lucan Sarsfields, Ballyboden St. Enda's, Parnell's, St. Vincent's and St. Oliver Plunkett's/Eoghan Ruadh qualified for the quarter-finals of the Dublin championship.

| 22 October 2011; 4:30; Quarter-final | St. Brigid's | 1–13 – 0–05 | Ballyboden St. Enda's | O'Toole Park; Referee: G McCormack (Naomh Barróg). |
| 22 October 2011; 4:30; Quarter-final | A Kerin 1–3 (0-3f), S Gibbons 0–3, D O'Reilly 0–1. | Report | Mark Cahill 0–7 (6f), P Ryan 1–1, K Darcy (2f), G McIntyre, P Andrews, A Daly 0–2, B Cahill 0–1. | O'Toole Park; Referee: G McCormack (Naomh Barróg). |

| 22 October 2011; 3:00; Quarter-final | Parnell's | 0–07 – 1–09 | Ballymun Kickhams | Parnell Park; Referee: K Tighe (St Anne's). |
| 22 October 2011; 3:00; Quarter-final | J Murtagh 0–2, B Byrne, C Begley, J Peyton, J Collins, MJ Tierney (1f) 0–1 each. | Report | E Reilly 1–0, D Rock (1f), J Burke, E Christie 0–2 each, A Hubbard, K Connolly, Derek Byrne 0–1 each. | Parnell Park; Referee: K Tighe (St Anne's). |

| 22 October 2011; 4:30; Quarter-final | St. Vincent's | 1–09 – 2–09 | St. Oliver Plunkett's/Eoghan Ruadh | Parnell Park; Referee: B O'Shea (St Mark's). |
| 22 October 2011; 4:30; Quarter-final | R Trainor 1–1, D Connolly 0–3 (2 45'), T Quinn (0-1f) 0–2, C Dorney, P Lee, A Baxter 0–1 each. | Report | B Brogan 0–6 (3f), J Sherlock 1–1, D Matthews 1–0, R McConnell, A D'Arcy, 0–1 each. | Parnell Park; Referee: B O'Shea (St Mark's). |

| 22 October 2011; 3:00; Quarter-final | Thomas Davis | 0–10 – 1–12 | Lucan Sarsfields | O'Toole Park; Referee: B Carroll (Fingal Ravens). |
| 22 October 2011; 3:00; Quarter-final | P Hudson 0–5 (4f), E Kirby, S McGrath, C Farrelly (f), J O'Reilly, S Smith 0–1 each. | Report | Dermot Gallagher 0–5, D Quinn 0–4 (1f), S Garbutt 1–0, B Gallagher 0–2 (1f), S O'Shaughnessy 0–1. | O'Toole Park; Referee: B Carroll (Fingal Ravens). |

== Semi-finals ==
Lucan Sarsfields, St. Brigid's, St. Oliver Plunkett's Eoghan Ruadh and Ballymun Kickhams qualified for the semi-finals of the Dublin championship.

| 29 October 2011; Semi-final | St. Oliver Plunkett's Eoghan Ruadh | 1–12 – 1–08 | Lucan Sarsfields | Parnell Park; Referee: P Kiernan (St Olaf's) |
| 29 October 2011; Semi-final | B Brogan 1–7 (0-2f), R McConnell, G Smith (2f) 0–2 each, J Sherlock 0–1. | Report | T Brennan 0–5 (2f), Dermot Gallagher 1–0, D Quinn 0–2, B Gallagher 0–1. | Parnell Park; Referee: P Kiernan (St Olaf's) |

| 29 October 2011; Semi-final | St. Brigid's | 1–18 – 0–12 | Ballymun Kickhams | Parnell Park; Referee: R Malone (St Mary's Saggart). |
| 29 October 2011; Semi-final | K Darcy 0–6 (5f), P Ryan 1–2, Mark Cahill (3f), P Andrews 0–3, B Cahill 0–2, J O'Loughlin, L McCarthy 0–1 each. | Report | Derek Byrne 1–3, K Leahy, D Rock (1f, 1 45') 0–3, B McCullagh, E Reilly, J Burke (f), 0–1. | Parnell Park; Referee: R Malone (St Mary's Saggart). |

== Dublin Senior Football Final ==
| St. Oliver Plunkett's Eoghan Ruadh | 0-08 – 0–10 (final score after 60 minutes) | St Brigids |
| Manager: Mick Galvin Team: Philip Brogan; R O'Connor; S Lyons; M Brides; C Evans; Paul Brogan; S Dunne; A Moyles; R McConnell (45) 0–1; C Walsh; G Smith (f) 0-01; D Matthews; A Brogan 0-03; B Brogan (2f) 0-03; J Sherlock. Substitutes: C Dunleavy for Dunne (ht); A Darcy for Matthews (48); C Daly for Smith (59) | Half-time: 0-04 – 0-04 Competition: Dublin Senior Football Championship (Final) Date: 15.30 GMT; 6 November 2011 Venue: Parnell Park, Dublin Attendance: Referee: G McCormack (Naomh Barróg) Match rules: 60 minutes. Replay if scores still level. Maximum of 5 substitutions. | Manager: Mark "Ram" Byrne & Gerry McEntee Team: Shane Supple; G Norton; Sean Murray; C Moran; A Daly; Martin Cahill; G Kane; Barry Cahill; John O'Loughlin; Paddy Andrews 0-01; G McIntyre 0-01; K Kilmurray; P Ryan; K Darcy (2f) 0–3; Mark Cahill 0–1 (f). Substitutes: L McCarthy (2f) 0-03 for Ryan (44); C Mullins for McIntyre (45); O McCann 0-01 for Kilmurray (54); C Doyle for Mark Cahill (61) |

== Relegation Championship ==
St Marks, Whitehall Colmcille, Naomh Mearnóg, Clontarf, St Judes and Fingallians contested the relegation championship due to losing their second round losers section games. Naomh Mearnóg and Clontarf won the first phase and therefore remained as senior championship teams for 2012. St. Jude's and Whitehall Colmcille won their respective second phase fixtures and also retained their senior status. The relegation final was contested by Fingallians and St. Mark's, with Fingallians being replaced in the senior championship by Dublin Intermediate Champions Skerries Harps.

The competition worked in the opposite way to a knockout competition. If you win, you are out and remain in the 2012 championship.

| 16 October 2011; 2:15; Relegation phase 1 | Naomh Mearnóg | 2–05 – 1–06 | St. Mark's | O'Toole Park |

| 16 October 2011; 3:00; Relegation phase 1 | Whitehall Colmcille | 0–01 – 1–16 | Clontarf | St. Margaret's |

| 20 November 2011; 12:00; Relegation phase 2 | St. Mark's | 0–07 – 1–10 | Whitehall Colmcille | O'Toole Park; Referee: B Carroll (Fingal Ravens) |

| 20 November 2011; 10:30; Relegation phase 2 | St. Jude's | v | Fingallians | O'Toole Park; Referee: B O'Shea (St. Mark's) |

| Relegation final | St. Mark's | 3–08 – 1–10 | Fingallians |
| Relegation final | | Report |
