= 2013 Dublin Senior Football Championship =

- 2013 Craobh Sinsear Peile; Bhaile Átha Cliath

Tournament details
- County: Dublin
- Year: 2013

Winners
- Champions: St. Vincent's (27th win)
- Captain: Ger Brennan

Promotion/Relegation
- Promoted team(s): St. Olaf's
- Relegated team(s): St. Mark's

The 2013 Dublin Senior Football Championship was the top club championship competition on the Dublin GAA calendar for 2013. The championship was changed since 2012, with a backdoor system no longer in place, meaning that the championship was played on a knockout basis. All teams knocked out in the first round of the Dublin championship were entered into a new Dublin Senior B Championship.

== Round one ==
The first round tie between Raheny and Naomh Maur finished on a draw after extra time and therefore the 16th team in the second round was to be decided with a replay. The shock of the round was a victory for Dublin minnows Ballinteer St. John's against a strong Oliver Plunketts Eoghan Ruadh side. Raheny defeated Naomh Maur in the first round replay at Parnell Park.

May 08, 2013; First Round	Parnells	1-11 - 0-06	O'Tooles	Parnell Park
May 08, 2013; First Round	Conor Mortimer 0-5 (0-1f), Andrew Shore 1-0, Stephen Cluxton (0-1f), Liam Browne, Andreas Doyle, M Gleeson, Colm Begley, John Dignam 0-1 each		Andrew Morris 0-3f, David Mooney, Conor McStay, Ciaran McGrath 0-1 each	Parnell Park

May 08, 2013; First Round	Ballyboden St. Enda's	2-18 - 3-09 aet	Lucan Sarsfields	Iveagh Grounds
May 08, 2013; First Round	Ryan Basquel 2-3, Declan O'Mahoney and Andrew Kerin (0-4f) 0-4 each, Sean Gibbons 0-3, Michael Darragh McCauley, Donagh McCabe, P. O'Brien, C. Smyth 0-1 each	Report	Brian Gallagher 1-2 (1-0 pen), Sean Newcombe and Stephen Garbutt 1-0 each, Tommy Brennan 0-3f, David Quinn and James O’Neill 0-2 each	Iveagh Grounds

May 08, 2013; First Round	St. Patrick's (P)	0-15 - 0-16	Fingal Ravens	St Margaret's

May 08, 2013; First Round	Templeogue SS	2-11 - 0-07	St. Peregrines	Kiltipper Road

May 08, 2013; First Round	Thomas Davis	1-14 - 0-11	Trinity Gaels	Cloghran

May 08, 2013; First Round	UCD	2-13 - 0-12	Skerries Harps	Balgriffin

May 08, 2013; First Round	St. Vincent's	0-11 - 0-06	Cuala	Parnell Park
May 08, 2013; First Round	T Quinn 0-5 (4f), D Connolly 0-3 (1f), E Fennell, G Burke, C Dorney 0-1 each.	Report	L Keating 0-3 (1f), C O'Brien, R Scollard, D MacBrien ('45') 0-1 each.	Parnell Park

May 09, 2013; First Round	St. Jude's	0-19 - 0-04	St. Anne's	O'Toole Park; Referee: P Fitzsimons (Liffey Gaels).
May 09, 2013; First Round	K McManamon 0-7 (1f), D Gallagher 0-3 (1f), S Ryan, R Joyce, J Donnelly 0-2 each, R O'Brien, D Donnelly, P Cunningham 0-1 each.	Report	C McKeown, S Fulham (f), D Watson, S Stewart 0-1 each.	O'Toole Park; Referee: P Fitzsimons (Liffey Gaels).

May 09, 2013; First Round	St. Sylvester's	2-16 - 3-08	Clontarf

May 09, 2013; First Round	Ballinteer St. John's	2-09 - 1-11	St. Oliver Plunkett's Eoghan Ruadh	Newcastle
May 09, 2013; First Round	Ferghal Duffy 1-4, Jack Gilligan 0-3, Aodhan Clabby 0-1, Paul Cronin 0-1, Peter O’Curry 1-0.	Report	Gareth Smith 1-5, Paddy McNulty 0-2 Paddy Bergin, Bernard Brogan, Leigh Herron & Jason Sherlock 0-1.	Newcastle

May 09, 2013; First Round	Na Fianna	2-11 - 2-06	Naomh Mearnóg

May 09, 2013; First Round	Erin's Isle	2-11 - 1-04	St. Mark's

May 10, 2013; First Round	Raheny	1-08 - 0-11	St. Maur's	Rolestown

May 10, 2013; First Round	Ballymun Kickhams	1-19 - 1-04	Round Towers, Clondalkin	Parnell Park

May 10, 2013; First Round	Kilmacud Crokes	5-16 - 2-05	St. Mary's, Saggart	O'Toole Park
May 10, 2013; First Round		Report		O'Toole Park

May 10, 2013; First Round	St. Brigid's	7-16 - 0-05	Whitehall Colmcille	Parnell Park

== Round two ==
The following teams qualified for the last 16 of the Dublin Senior Football Championship: St. Jude's, Parnell's, Ballyboden St. Enda's, Fingal Ravens, Templeogue Synge Street, Thomas Davis, UCD, St. Vincent's, Ballinteer St. John's, St. Sylvester's, Na Fianna, Kilmacud Crokes, Ballymun Kickhams, St. Brigid's, Raheny and Erin's Isle.* All winning teams from the second round progressed to the quarter finals of the Dublin championship and the losing sides will return in the 2014 Dublin Senior Football Championship.

2 October 2013; Round Two	**Fingal Ravens**	**2-9 - 1-13**	**Raheny**	Balgriffin; Referee: J King (Garda).
2 October 2013; Round Two	E O’Flaherty 2-0, N Tormey (0-3f), C Norton (0-3f) 0-3 each, R Begg, D Kavanagh, S McDonagh 0-1 each.	Report	G Ivory 1-4 (1-0 pen, 0-2f), B Fenton, P Reid 0-2 each, M Victory (45), G Coady, Stephen Swords, S Collins, E Keogh 0-1 each.	Balgriffin; Referee: J King (Garda).

2 October 2013; Round Two	**UCD**	**1-05 - 3-12**	**St. Jude's**	Iveagh Grounds; Referee: R Malone (St Mary’s Saggart).
2 October 2013; Round Two	J Heslin 1-0, C Boyle, P Reilly (0-1 ’45′) 0-2, N Kilroy 0-1.	Report	D Donnelly 2-1 (1-0pen), R Joyce 1-1, K McManamon (1f), J Donnelly (1f), M Sweeney 0-2, C Guckian, C Murphy, E Dalton, P Maguire 0-1 each.	Iveagh Grounds; Referee: R Malone (St Mary’s Saggart).

3 October 2013; Round Two	**St. Vincent's**	**2-24 - 2-07**	**Na Fianna**	St. Margaret's; Referee: G McCormack (Naomh Barróg).
3 October 2013; Round Two	C Dorney 2-3, T Quinn 0-7 (0-3f, 0-1 ‘45’), G Burke, R Trainor 0-3 each, S Carthy 0-2, C Diamond, E Fennell, M Loftus, D Connolly, A Martin, M Concarr 0-1 each.	Report	C McHugh 2-3 (1-0 pen, 0-1f), P Quinn (0-1f), A Caffrey (f), N McGovern (0-145), E Connolly 0-1 each.	St. Margaret's; Referee: G McCormack (Naomh Barróg).

4 October 2013; Round Two	**Ballinteer St. John's**	**1-08 - 1-19**	**St. Sylvester's**	Balgriffin; Referee: M Bissett (Whitehall Colmcille).
4 October 2013; Round Two	E Keating 0-7, N Dunne 0-5 (2f), E Fanning 1-1, M McCarthy 0-2, G Sweeney, K Sweeney, G Hazley, A Foy 0-1 each.	Report	P Cronin 1-1 (1-0 pen), P O’Connor 0-4, A Clabby, S Tully, D Gormley 0-1 each.	Balgriffin; Referee: M Bissett (Whitehall Colmcille).

4 October 2013; Round Two	**St. Brigid's**	**5-16 - 0-17**	**Thomas Davis**	Newcastle
4 October 2013; Round Two	P Ryan 2-05 (1f), K Bonner 2-0, P Andrews 1-1, L McCarthy 0-2, D Plunkett, M Cahill 0-1 each.	Report	P Hudson 0-8 (4f), C Farrelly 0-6 (4f), C Galvin, S Reilly and E Kirby 0-1 each.	Newcastle

4 October 2013; Round Two	**Erin's Isle**	**0-4 - 4-23**	**Ballymun Kickhams**	Parnell Park; Referee: D Feeney (Parnell’s).
4 October 2013; Round Two	D Murray, C Flynn (f), D Fegan, L Sweetman 0-1 each.	Report	J Whelan, A O’Brien (0-2f) 1-2 each, D Rock, T Furman 1-1 each, K Leahy, L O’Donovan, Derek Byrne 0-4 each, S George 0-3, J McCarthy, Davy Byrne 0-1 each.	Parnell Park; Referee: D Feeney (Parnell’s).

5 October 2013; Round Two	**Kilmacud Crokes**	**0-12 - 2-09**	**Ballyboden St. Enda's**	O'Toole Park; Referee: B O’Shea (St Mark’s).
5 October 2013; Round Two	M Vaughan 0-7 (0-4f, 0-1 ‘45’), S Williams, B Kavanagh (f), K Nolan, M Coughlan, L óg Ó hÉineacháin 0-1 each.	Report	R Basquel (0-1f), A Kerin (0-2f) 1-2, C Keaney 0-2, S O’Connor, S Gibbons, D McCabe 0-1 each.	O'Toole Park; Referee: B O’Shea (St Mark’s).

5 October 2013; Round Two	**Parnell's**	**1-22 - 0-05**	**Templeogue Synge Street**	Parnell Park; Referee: S McCarthy (St Vincent’s).
5 October 2013; Round Two	C Mortimer 1-9 (0-4f), J Bealin, J Dignam (1f), C Begley 0-3 each, A Hurley, S Cluxton (45), A Jameson, A Shore 0-1 each.	Report	T Coyne 0-3 (3f), M Hiney, M Swaine 0-1 each.	Parnell Park; Referee: S McCarthy (St Vincent’s).

- Winning teams in bold.

== Quarter-finals ==
St. Vincent's, St. Jude's, St. Brigid's, Raheny, St. Sylvester's, Ballyboden St. Enda's and Ballymun Kickhams all qualified for the quarter finals of the Dublin championship.

18 October 2013; Semi Final	Parnells	1-09 - 1-12	St. Jude's	Parnell Park; Referee: J King (Garda).
18 October 2013; Semi Final	M Lynch 1-0, C Mortimer 0-3 (1f), J Dignam 0-2 (2f), S Cluxton (f), R Quinlivan, A Jameson, A Shore 0-1 each.	Report	K McManamon 1-6 (0-5f), R Joyce 0-2, P Maguire, M Sweeney, R O’Brien, T McKeon 0-1 each.	Parnell Park; Referee: J King (Garda).

18 October 2013; Semi Final	Raheny	0-07 - 0-15	Ballymun Kickhams	Parnell Park; Referee: R Malone (St Mary’s, Saggart).
18 October 2013; Semi Final	D Henry 0-2 (1f), P Reid, P O’Higgins, E Keogh, Stephen Swords, C Murphy 0-1 each.	Report	D Rock 0-7 (5f), K Leahy, Derek Byrne (1f) 0-2, T Furman, E Reilly, S George, J Burke 0-1 each.	Parnell Park; Referee: R Malone (St Mary’s, Saggart).

19 October 2013; Semi Final	St. Brigid's	1-11 - 2-13	Ballyboden St. Enda's	Parnell Park; Referee: S McCarthy (St Vincent’s).
19 October 2013; Semi Final	P Ryan 0-4 (2f), S Supple 1-0 (pen), L McCarthy 0-2 (1f), D Plunkett, K Bonner, Mark Cahill, P Andrews, W Finnegan 0-1 each.	Report	R Basquel 1-2 (0-1 ‘45’), C Keaney, A Kerin (2f) 0-4, D O’Reilly 1-0, D O’Mahony 0-2, K Naughton 0-1.	Parnell Park; Referee: S McCarthy (St Vincent’s).

19 October 2013; Semi Final	St. Vincent's	0-14 - 2-07	St. Sylvester's	Parnell Park; Referee: Go McMahon (O’Dwyer’s)
19 October 2013; Semi Final	T Quinn 0-6 (0-2f, 0-2 ‘45’), C Dorney 0-3, D Connolly, G Burke, S Carthy, H Gill, G Brennan 0-1 each.	Report	E Keating 1-2, N Dunne 0-3, M Brennan 1-0, M McCarthy 0-2.	Parnell Park; Referee: Go McMahon (O’Dwyer’s)

== Semifinals ==
Semi Final	Ballymun Kickhams	0-15 - 0-09	St. Jude's	Parnell Park; Referee: J King (Garda).
Semi Final	D Rock 0-8 (0-7f), T Furman 0-4, K Leahy, J Small, Derek Byrne 0-1 each.	Report	K McManamon 0-5 (0-4f), R O’Brien, P Maguire, M Sweeney, T McKeon 0-1 each.	Parnell Park; Referee: J King (Garda).

Semi Final	Ballyboden St. Enda's	0-15 - 4-12	St. Vincent's	Parnell Park; Referee: D Sheppard (St Peregrine’s).
Semi Final	A Kerin 0-10 (0-9f), K Naughton 0-3, D McCabe, S O’Connor 0-1 each.	Report	D Connolly 2-2, C Dorney 1-1, K Bonnie 1-0, T Quinn 0-4 (0-1f), S Carthy, G Burke 0-2, C Diamond 0-1.	Parnell Park; Referee: D Sheppard (St Peregrine’s).

== Finals ==
Final	St. Vincent's	0-20 - 1-17	Ballymun Kickhams	Parnell Park; Referee: G McMahon (O’Dwyer’s).
Final	G Burke, T Quinn (0-4f) 0-6 each, K Golden 1-0, D Connolly 0-2 (0-1f), C Dorney, S Carthy, R Trainor 0-1 each..	Report	D Rock 0-8 (0-6f), K Leahy, T Furman, L O’Donovan 0-2 each, E Reilly, A O’Brien, A Hubbard, J McCarthy, Derek Byrne, J Small 0-1 each.	Parnell Park; Referee: G McMahon (O’Dwyer’s).

Final Replay	St. Vincent's	1-09 - 1-08	Ballymun Kickhams	Parnell Park; Referee: D Sheppard (Round Tower, Lusk).
Final Replay	T Quinn 0-5 (0-4f), C Dorney 1-0, D Connolly 0-2, K Golden (0-1f), C Diamond 0-1 each.	Report	D Rock 1-5 (1-0 pen, 0-4f), Derek Byrne, T Furman, L O’Donovan 0-1 each.	Parnell Park; Referee: D Sheppard (Round Tower, Lusk).

== Senior B Championship ==
=== First round ===
The eight winning teams in the first round progress to the second round of the senior B championship. The eight losers must enter a relegation championship.

2013; Round One	St. Mark's	1-06 - 12-20	St. Oliver Plunkett's Eoghan Ruadh

2013; Round One	St. Peregrine's	1-12 - 0-18	Lucan Sarsfields

2013; Round One	Skerries	3-14 - 0-14	St. Patrick's, Palmerstown

2013; Round One	St. Anne's	4-16 - 3-09	Naomh Mearnóg

2013; Round One	Cuala	1-16 - 0-13	Trinity Gaels

2013; Round One	Clontarf	0-10 - 2-05	O'Toole's

2013; Round One	Whitehall Colmcille	0-06 - 2-08	St. Mary's

2013; Round One	Round Tower's Clondalkin	0-13 - 0-12	Naomh Maur

=== Quarter-finals ===
2013; Quarter Final	St. Oliver Plunkett's/Eoghan Ruadh	5-16 - 1-11	Round Towers, Clondalkin

2013; Quarter Final	St. Anne's	1-15 - 3-10	Skerries Harps

2013; Quarter Final	O'Toole's	v	Lucan Sarsfields

2013; Quarter Final	St. Mary's, Saggart	1-11 - 4-10	Cuala

== Relegation Championship ==
The relegation championship is the opposite of the usual format of a championship. The winner of each game leaves the competition when they lose their game, the losers go on to the next stage. The team that loses all their games will get relegated if the Dublin Intermediate champions are a non senior championship club. The relegation championship was cancelled as St. Mark's opted to be relegated and rebuild their team in the Dublin Intermediate Football Championship in 2015.

2013; Relegation	St. Mark's	v	St. Maur's

2013; Relegation	Naomh Mearnóg	v	St. Pat's, Palmerstown

2013; Relegation	Clontarf	v	St. Peregrine's

2013; Relegation	Whitehall Colmcille	v	Trinity Gaels
