= John O'Loughlin (dual player) =

Gaelic footballer from County Laois, Ireland

Personal information
- Native name: Seán Ó Lochlainn (Irish)
- Nickname: Johno
- Born: 7 January 1989 (age 37) Laois, Ireland
- Occupation: Teacher
- Height: 1.88 m (6 ft 2 in)

Sport
- Sport: Gaelic football
- Position: Midfield
Clubs
- Years: Club
- Until 2011 2011 - 2019 2019 - present: Mountmellick GAA; St Brigid's; Rosenallis GAA
Club titles
- Dublin titles: 1
Inter-county
Years	County	Apps (scores)
2008–2022	Laois	167

John O'Loughlin (born 7 January 1989) is a Gaelic footballer and hurler from County Laois.

He usually plays in defence or midfield for the Laois county football team and in 2007 was part of the Laois teams that won the Leinster Minor Football Championship and Leinster Under-21 Football Championship.

In 2008, he was called on to the Laois senior squad by manager Liam Kearns. He played his first match for Laois against Galway in Salthill in the national league and made his championship debut in May 2008 in a win over Wicklow.

In July 2011, he joined Dublin club St Brigid's, which is based in Castleknock. O'Loughlin follows several other Laois players who have recently transferred to Dublin clubs, with Parnells club the most prominent destination.

O'Loughlin made a winning start with his new club on 26 July 2011 as he started on the St Brigid's team which defeated Trinity Gaels to move to the top of Dublin's Division 1 league table. He later helped them to win the Dublin Senior Football Championship.

In 2015, O'Loughlin was chosen to represent Ireland in the International Rules Series in Croke Park, as Ireland won by a four-point margin.

In February 2018, O'Loughlin made his 100th league and championship appearance for Laois against Waterford in O'Moore Park in the national league in his 11th season.

In May 2022, O'Loughlin announced his retirement from inter-county football, having appeared in 167 games, making him the Laois player with the third highest all-time number of appearances (behind Ross Munnelly and Michael Lawlor).

== Honours ==
Club

- Laois Intermediate Football Championship (1): 2006
- Dublin Senior Football Championship (1): 2011

County

- Leinster Minor Football Championship (1): 2007
- Leinster Under-21 Football Championship (1): 2007

Country

- International Rules Series (1) : 2015

== Personal ==
O'Loughlin works as a primary school teacher. In 2022 he married his longtime girlfriend Anna.
