= 2002 Dublin Senior Football Championship =

Tournament details
- County: Dublin
- Year: 2002

Winners
- Champions: UCD

UCD (University College Dublin) won the 2002 Dublin Senior Football Championship. This was the 6th time that they won the Championship. They would have another win in 2006.
