= Isles of the Sea GAA =

Gaelic games club in County Dublin, Ireland

Isles of the Sea
- Inse na Mara
- Founded: 1889
- County: Dublin

Isles of the Sea GAA (Irish: Inse na Mara ) was a Gaelic Athletic Association gaelic football club in the Ringsend area of County Dublin, Ireland.

== History ==
The club was founded in the late 1880s in the very early years of the GAA.

The Dublin Senior Football Championship was won on three occasions (1890, 1895 and 1901) and players from the club backboned the Dublin team that won the 1901 All-Ireland Senior Football Championship on 2 August 1903.

The club first won the championship in 1890 beating Young Irelands 0-5 to 0-0 in the final, captained by Charlie Thompson. The captain for the second win in 1895 was Tommy Dunne.

In the 1901 Dublin final, Isles of the Sea, captained by Dan Holland, defeated Ballymun Kickhams. The club was awarded the Dublin senior championship cup to keep permanently and the cup is now in the museum in Collins Barracks near Heuston station. Isles of the Sea then qualified for the 1901 All Ireland Final against London Hibernians, winning 0-14 to 0-2. The captain of London Hibernians was Sam Maguire after whom the All-Ireland trophy would later be named.

Isles had four Whelans in the team, Val Harris, who went on to play international soccer for Ireland and at the top level in England for Everton and Thomas Doyle, grandfather of another future Republic of Ireland international soccer player Jackie Mooney.

== Roll of Honour ==
- Dublin Senior Football Championship: Winners (3) 1890, 1895, 1901
