= 2003 Dublin Senior Football Championship =

Tournament details
- County: Dublin
- Year: 2003

Winners
- Champions: St Brigid's (1st win)

St Brigid's won the 2003 Dublin Senior Football Championship against Kilmacud Crokes. Brigid's won by 0–17 to 1–08 against.
