= 2015 Dublin Senior Football Championship =

- 2015 Craobh Sinsear Peile; Bhaile Átha Cliath

Tournament details
- County: Dublin
- Year: 2015

Promotion/Relegation
- Promoted team(s): N/A
- Relegated team(s): N/A

In Gaelic football, St. Vincent's were the defending champions in the Dublin Senior Football Championship after winning the Dublin Championship in 2013 and 2014. Castleknock played in the 2015 Senior Championship after winning the 2014 Dublin Intermediate Football Championship.

== Round 1 ==
The first round began on 6 May 2015 with five games. A further four games were played on 7 May with a facile win for last years finalists St. Oliver Plunkett's Eoghan Ruadh as the standout fixture. On 8 May, several games were cancelled due to weather conditions although, two games did go ahead with wins for Clontarf and Na Fianna. Parnells, Naomh Maur, Erins Isle, Whitehall Colmcille, Round Towers Clondalkin, O'Toole's, St. Peregrines, Thomas Davis, Fingal Ravens, St. Mary's, Cuala, Castleknock and Templeogue Synge Street were all knocked out in the first round. All the losing teams go on to play in the Dublin Senior B Football Championship and the winning teams progress to the second round of the Dublin Senior Football Championship.

First Round	Ballymun Kickhams	2-19 - 0-5	Parnells	Parnell Park; Referee: D Harrington (St Sylvester's)
First Round	Dean Rock 1-6 (1-0 pen, 0-5f), Jason Whelan 0-4, Kevin Leahy 1-0, Alan Hubbard and Fiach Andrews 0-2 each, Davy Byrne, James McCarthy, Elliott Reilly, Andrew O'Brien, Derek Byrne 0-1 each	Report	Willie Henry and Shane Duffy (0-1f) 0-2 each, Colm Begley 0-1	Parnell Park; Referee: D Harrington (St Sylvester's)

First Round	Ballyboden St. Enda's	2-10 - 0-7	Naomh Maur	Parnell Park
First Round	Andrew Kerin 1-5 (1-0 pen, 0-3f, 1 sl), Sam Molony 1-1, Ryan Basquel 0-2, Declan O'Mahony 0-1		Conor McGuire 0-3 (0-1f), Chis Carthy 0-2, Luke Fletcher and Ciaran Reddin 0-1 each	Parnell Park

First Round	St. Brigid's	3-17 - 0-06	Erins Isle

First Round	Kilmacud Crokes	0-13 - 0-5	Whitehall Colmcille	Silverpark; Referee: A Cummins (RT Clondalkin)
First Round	Brian Kavanagh (0-3f), Barry O'Rorke (0-1f), Dara Mullin 0-3 each, Shane Horan 0-2, David Campbell and Mark Vaughan (0-1f) 0-1 each		Cormac Costello 0-4 (0-2f) and Sean Moran 0-1	Silverpark; Referee: A Cummins (RT Clondalkin)

First Round	St. Anne's	0-10 - 1-06	Round Tower's, Clondalkin

First Round	Skerries Harps	1-15 - 1-09	O'Toole's	Balgriffin

First Round	St. Oliver Plunkett's Eoghan Ruadh	5-15 - 0-9	St. Peregrine's	Russell Park; Referee: D McKitterick (Fingallians)
First Round	Bernard Brogan 2-7 (0-1f), Niall Walsh 2-1, Gareth Smith 0-4, Paul Brogan 1-0, James Brogan, Ross McConnell, Alan Brogan 0-1 each	Report	Robert McCarthy 0-7 (0-5f) and Eric Lowndes 0-2	Russell Park; Referee: D McKitterick (Fingallians)

First Round	St. Jude's	3-20 - 0-08	St. Mary's Saggart	Bohernabreena

First Round	Na Fianna	0-16 - 1-09	Thomas Davis

First Round	Fingal Ravens	3-03 - 0-13	Clontarf

9 May 2015; First Round	Ballinteer St. John's	2-10 - 0-12	Cuala	O'Toole Park; Referee: Donal Ryan (St Patrick's Palmerstown)
9 May 2015; First Round	Shane McCann 1-2, Luke Naughton 1-0, Fearghal Duffy 0-3f, Aodhan Clabby 0-2, Glenn Whelan, Ciaran McCabe, Robbie Gaughan (0-1f) 0-1 each	Report	Luke Keating 0-6 (0-4f), Darren McBrien (0-2f) and Matthew Clancy 0-2 each, Colum Sheanon and Dara Spillane 0-1 each	O'Toole Park; Referee: Donal Ryan (St Patrick's Palmerstown)

9 May 2015; First Round	UCD	1-10 - 0-12	Templeogue Synge Street	O'Toole Park; Referee: Shay Farrelly (Ballinteer St John's)
9 May 2015; First Round	Rob Carr 0-7 (0-3f), Mark Hughes 1-0, Conor McCarthy 0-2, M Monahan 0-1	Report	Niall Scully 0-3 (0-1f), T Coyne (0-2f) and Cathal Morley 0-2 each, C O'Sullivan, Mark Swaine, Fintan Coffey, Declan Treanor, A O'Brien 0-1 each	O'Toole Park; Referee: Shay Farrelly (Ballinteer St John's)

5 June 2015; First Round	Raheny	1-13 - 0-7	Naomh Mearnóg	Parnell Park; Referee: Darragh Sheppard (Round Tower Lusk)
5 June 2015; First Round	Donal Ryan 1-4 (0-2f), Brian Fenton 0-3, Eoghan Keogh 0-2, Ger Coady, David Shatwell, David Carroll, Paddy Reid 0-1 each	Report Report	Jamie Storey 0-4, Jordan Briggs, Niall Murphy, Jamie Walsh (0-1f) 0-1 each	Parnell Park; Referee: Darragh Sheppard (Round Tower Lusk)

June 2015; First Round	St. Vincents	2-14 - 0-6	Naomh Olaf	Chanel College; Referee: F Shanahan (St. Margaret's)
June 2015; First Round	Ruairi Treanor 1-3, Tomás Quinn 1-2 (1-0 pen, 0-2f), Gavin Burke 0-4, Cormac Diamond 0-2, Brendan Egan, Eamonn Fennell, Nathan Mullins 0-1 each	Report	Brian Begley (0-1f) and Darragh Byrne 0-2 each, Fergal McCann and Mark Doyle 0-1 each	Chanel College; Referee: F Shanahan (St. Margaret's)

September 2015; First Round	St. Pats	4-06 - 2-08	St. Sylvester's	Garristown.
September 2015; First Round		Report		Garristown.

30 September 2015; First Round	Lucan Sarsfields	1-9 - 0-10	Castleknock	Monastery Road
30 September 2015; First Round	Sean Newcombe 1-0, Emmett Ó Conghaile 0-3, Paul Casey, Stephen O'Shaugnessy, John McCaffrey, Brendan Gallagher 0-1 each	Report	Ciaran Kilkenny and Tommy Corcoran 0-3 each, Des Carlos 0-2f, Dave McConn and Martin Brady 0-1 each	Monastery Road

== Second round ==
June 2015; Second Round	Clontarf	1-10 - 0-11	Skerries Harps	Donabate; Referee: S McCarthy (St Vincent's)
June 2015; Second Round	Ciaran Johnson 1-3 (0-1f), Ian O'Dwyer 0-3 (3f), Aidan O'Neill 0-2, Mark Hughes, Padraic Syron 0-1 each	Report	D Reilly 0-4 (1f), Graham Cullen, Bryan Cullen 0-2 each, C Daly, Paul Cashman, Harry Dawson 0-1 each.	Donabate; Referee: S McCarthy (St Vincent's)

June 2015; Second Round	Na Fianna	6-17 - 0-09	UCD	O'Toole Park
June 2015; Second Round	Conor McHugh 0-7 (0-2f), Aaron Byrne (1-0 pen), E Neville 2-0 each, D Quinn 1-1, JJ Martin 1-0, Tomas Brady 0-3, P Quinn 0-2, Adam Caffrey, Jack Caffrey, Jonny Cooper, Glen O’Reilly 0-1 each.	Report	R Carr 0-4 (0-4f), Conor McCarthy 0-3 (0-1f), D Murphy, B Smith 0-1 each.	O'Toole Park

June 2015; Second Round	St. Anne's	1-09 - 0-11	Ballinteer St. Johns
June 2015; Second Round		Report

2 October 2015; Second Round	Ballyboden St. Enda's	1-11 - 0-10	Kilmacud Crokes	Parnell Park
2 October 2015; Second Round	Andrew Kerin 1-5 (1-0 pen, 0-2f), Conal Keaney, Ryan Basquel 0-2 each, Stephen O'Connor, Michael Darragh Macauley 0-1 each.	Report	Brian Kavanagh 0-3 (0-2f), Mark Vaughan (0-2f), D Mullin 0-2 each, D Ward, Paul Mannion (0-1f) 0-1 each.	Parnell Park

2 October 2015; Second Round	St. Oliver Plunketts/Eoghan Ruadh	0-13 - 1-05	Raheny	Parnell Park; Referee: B Tiernan (O'Dwyer's).
2 October 2015; Second Round	Gareth Smith 0-6 (0-1 '45'), Bernard Brogan 0-3, Alan Brogan 0-2, S O'Connor, Niall Walsh (0-1f) 0-1 each.	Report	Gavin Ivory 1-1 (0-1 '45'), Eoghan Smith, Donal Ryan (0-1f), Eoin Keogh, Stephen Swords 0-1 each.	Parnell Park; Referee: B Tiernan (O'Dwyer's).

3 October 2015; Second Round	St. Vincent's	0-19 - 0-13	Ballymun Kickhams	Parnell Park; Referee: D O'Connor (Nh Mearnóg).
3 October 2015; Second Round	Tomas Quinn 0-9 (0-7, 0-1 '45'), Nathan Mullins, K Golden, Diarmuid Connolly (0-1f) 0-2 each, Cameron Diamond, Shane B. Carthy, Cormac Diamond, Joe Feeney 0-1 each.	Report	Dean Rock 0-5 (0-4f, 0-1 pen), Jason Whelan 0-2, Karl Connolly, Alan Hubbard, James Burke, D McGivney, L O'Donovan, Paddy Small 0-1 each.	Parnell Park; Referee: D O'Connor (Nh Mearnóg).

3 October 2015; Second Round	Lucan Sarsfields	4-15 - 0-07	St. Patrick's Palmerstown	O'Toole Park; Referee: S McCarthy (St Vincent’s).
3 October 2015; Second Round	Brendan Gallagher 2-5 (0-2f), Declan O’Shaughnessy 1-2, Brian Collopy 1-1, C Gallagher 0-3, Phillip Green (0-1f), Emmett Ó Conghaile, Sean Newcome, K Fitzgerald 0-1 each.	Report	C Driver 0-3 (0-2f), J Kelly 0-2 (0-2f), D Rushe, D Murray 0-1 each.	O'Toole Park; Referee: S McCarthy (St Vincent’s).

3 October 2015; Second Round	St. Jude's	0-13 - 0-09	St. Brigids	O'Toole Park; Referee: G Power (Parnell's).
3 October 2015; Second Round	Kevin McManamon 0-8 (0-5f, 0-1 ‘45’), Ronan Joyce, Paul Maguire, Thomas Lahiff, Colm Murphy, Paul Cunningham 0-1 each.	Report	Paddy Andrews 0-5 (0-4f), Philly Ryan 0-2 (0-2f), C Doyle, Barry Cahill 0-1 each.	O'Toole Park; Referee: G Power (Parnell's).

== Quarter finals ==
18 October 2015; Quarter Final	St. Jude's	0-07 - 1-09	Na Fianna	Parnell Park; Referee: D O'Connor (Nh Mearnóg).
18 October 2015; Quarter Final	Kevin McManamon 0-4 (0-2f, 0-1 45), Enda Dalton 0-2, Declan Donnelly 0-1 (0-1f).	Report	Aaron Byrne 1-2, Adam Caffrey 0-3 (0-2f), JJ Martin, Conor McHugh, Tomas Brady, Jack Caffrey 0-1 each.	Parnell Park; Referee: D O'Connor (Nh Mearnóg).

18 October 2015; Quarter Final	Lucan Sarsfields	2-11 - 2-21	St. Vincent's	Parnell Park; Referee: D Feeney (Parnell's).
18 October 2015; Quarter Final	Brendan Gallagher 1-3 (0-1f), Stephen O’Shaughnessy 1-1, Emmett O Conghaile 0-3, Sean Newcombe, Philip Greene (0-1 '45'), Conor Gallagher (0-1f), Rory Kelly 0-1 each.	Report	Tomas Quinn 0-6 (0-3f, 0-2 45), Shane B. Carthy 0-5, Nathan Mullins, Joe Feeney 1-0 each, Ciaran Dorney, Diarmuid Connolly 0-3 each, Gavin Burke 0-2, Cormac Diamond, Ruairi Trainor 0-1 each.	Parnell Park; Referee: D Feeney (Parnell's).

17 October 2015; Quarter Final	St. Anne's	0-07 - 0-19	Clontarf	Parnell Park; Referee: Barry Tiernan (O’Dwyer’s).
17 October 2015; Quarter Final	Criag McKeown 0-4 (0-2f), Scott Fulham 0-3 (0-2f).	Report	Ciaran Johnson 0-7 (0-2f, 0-1 ‘45’), Jack McCaffrey, Maitias MacDonncha, Aidan O’Neill 0-2 each, Ian O’Dwyer, Andrew Foley, Martin Dufficy, Mark Hughes, Padraic Syron, Ciaran Finan 0-1 each.	Parnell Park; Referee: Barry Tiernan (O’Dwyer’s).

17 October 2015; Quarter Final	Ballyboden St. Enda's	1-12 - 1-11	St. Oliver Plunkett's Eoghan Ruadh	Parnell Park; Attendance: Parnell Park; Referee: Seán McCarthy (St Vincent’s).
17 October 2015; Quarter Final	Colm Basquel 1-1, Andrew Kerin 0-3 (0-1f), Ryan Basquel 0-2 (0-2f), Darren O’Reilly, Bob Dwan, Darragh Nelson, Conal Keaney, Sam Molony, David O’Callaghan 0-1 each.	Report	Bernard Brogan 1-4 (0-3f), Gareth Smith, Niall Walsh 0-2 each, Ross McConnell, Alan Brogan, Padraic Lee 0-1 each.	Parnell Park; Attendance: Parnell Park; Referee: Seán McCarthy (St Vincent’s).

== Semi finals ==
25 October 2015; Semi Final	St. Vincent's	0-22 - 2-09	Na Fianna	Parnell Park; Referee: D Sheppard (Round Towers, Lusk)
25 October 2015; Semi Final	Diarmuid Connolly 0-5, Ruairi Trainor 0-4, Joe Feeney 0-3, Gavin Burke, Ciaran Dorney and Tomas Quinn 0-2 (0-1f) each, Cormac Diamond, Michael Concarr, Shane B. Carthy and Brendan Egan 0-1 each.		Adam Caffrey 1-2 (0-2f), Odhran O'Maoleidigh 1-0, Aaron Byrne 0-3 (0-1f), Tomas Brady, Jack Caffrey (0-1f), Niall Cooper and Glen O’Reilly 0-1 each.	Parnell Park; Referee: D Sheppard (Round Towers, Lusk)

26 October 2015; Semi Final	Ballyboden St. Enda's	0-12 - 0-10	Clontarf	Parnell Park; Referee: G McCormack (Naomh Barróg).
26 October 2015; Semi Final	Andrew Kerin 0-7 (7f), Ryan Basquel, Stephen Hiney, Stephen O’Connor, Sean Gibbons and David O’Callaghan 0-1 each.	Report	Ciaran Johnson 0-3 (2f), Maitias MacDonncha 0-2 (1f), Declan Monaghan, Morgan Walsh, Jack McCaffrey, Aidan O’Neill, Padraic Syron 0-1 each.	Parnell Park; Referee: G McCormack (Naomh Barróg).

== Final ==
1 November 2015; Final	Ballyboden St. Enda's	2-08 - 0-10	St. Vincent's	Parnell Park; Referee: B Tiernan (O'Dwyer's)
1 November 2015; Final	Andrew Kerin 2-1 (1-0 pen, 1f), Ryan Basquel 0-3, Aaron Waters, Darren O'Reilly, Colm Basquel, Conal Keaney 0-1 each.	Report	Tomas Quinn 0-6 (6f), Ruairi Trainor 0-2, Shane B. Carthy, Gavin Burke 0-1 each.	Parnell Park; Referee: B Tiernan (O'Dwyer's)
