= 2004 Dublin Senior Football Championship =

Irish football championship

Tournament details
- County: Dublin
- Year: 2004

Winners
- Champions: Kilmacud Crokes (4th win)

Kilmacud Crokes won the 2004 Dublin Senior Football Championship against Ballyboden St Endas. Kilmacud won by 1-11 to 2-02 against Ballyboden.
