= Tyrrelstown GAA =

Gaelic games club in Dublin, Ireland

- Founded: 2009
- County: Dublin
- Colours: Navy, Green and White
- Grounds: Bellgree

Playing kits
Standard colours

Tyrrelstown GAA (Irish: CLG Bhaile an Tirialaigh) is one of six Gaelic Athletic Association (GAA) clubs based in Dublin 15 (the others are Castleknock, Erin Go Bragh, Garda, St Brigid's, St Peregrines and Westmanstown Gaels). The club was officially launched, in 2009, during the GAA's 125th anniversary year. The club fields teams at juvenile level in football, hurling, and camogie from Under 8 through to Under 16. Their colours are navy, green and white.

== History ==
Tyrrelstown GAA club was founded in February 2009.

The Tyrrelstown GAA Social team played in the Dublin 15 Cross Community Integration Group Cup in 2009 against St. Peregrines GAA winning 3-4 to 2-6 winning the club's first trophy.

The club started competing for the first time at junior level in 2010, entering a team in the Junior E Championship and Division 11 North. Their Junior football team reached their first Junior football championship final in 2011 losing to Geraldine Morans.

The junior football team played their home games in St. Catherines Park for the 2012 season. They co-organised a football tournament with St. Peregrines in August 2012. Also participating, along with Tyrrelstown and St. Peregrines, were fellow Dublin 15 club Erin Go Bragh and Croi Ro Naofa from Killinarden. Croi Ro Naofa beat Tyrrelstown in the cup final while St. Peregrines defeated Erin Go Bragh in the shield final.

== Honours ==
- Dublin Junior E Football Championship (0): (runners up in 2011)
