= Geraldine Moran's GAA =

Gaelic games club in County Dublin, Ireland

Geraldines P. Moran GAA
- Founded: 1886
- County: Dublin
- Colours: Black and Amber
- Grounds: Cornelscourt

Playing kits
Standard colours

Geraldines Patrick Moran (Irish: Gearaltaigh Uí Mhóráin ) are a Gaelic Athletic Association (GAA) club based in Cornelscourt, south Co. Dublin. They are one of the oldest GAA clubs in County Dublin. Their home ground is located beside Cornelscourt Shopping Centre. The club is an amalgamation of two clubs - Foxrock Geraldines and Patrick Morans. They currently play Gaelic Football in Dublin Intermediate Championship and AFL Division 5, as well as Minor Football in Division 7. The club also has juvenile teams from Under 8 to Under 16. Ladies Gaelic Division 7 and Gaelic for Mothers and Others is also available with the team set up during 2021. During 2021, the adult hurling section was also re-established.

== History ==
=== Foxrock Geraldines ===
Foxrock Geraldines were founded in 1900 and originally called Foxrock Independents until 1903. The club amalgamated with Cabinteely Geraldines and was then known as Foxrock Geraldines. Cabinteely Geraldines themselves named after Lord Edward Fitzgerald were founded in 1886. James Farrell was listed as club secretary and Oliver Whites as captain. Players hailed from Stillorgan, Glenamuck, Deansgrange and Dun Laoghire.

The club was present at the first ever Dublin County Board meeting with Patrick Cunniam as their delegate. Cabinteely Geraldines reached the first ever Dublin Senior Football Championship final losing to Feagh McHughs 2-4 to 2-1 in Donnybrook. They reached the final again in 1888, losing to C.J. Kickhams. The club lost many players to Dun Leary Independents in 1890 due to the Parnell Split, a time when many clubs in Dublin disbanded. The club continued onwards until 1903, joining forces with Foxrock Independents. The club went on to win a junior football league in 1907. McGarry of Foxrock Geraldines represented Dublin at junior inter county level in 1915.

They lost several players to Stars of Erin in 1913. From 1900 to the early 1920s the club was to lose many players not only to other clubs but also World War I, the War of Independence and the Civil War. J.J. Clare the Irish Olympic Chairman around this time was also a committed Foxrock Geraldines member.

The club competed at both adult and minor levels through the 1930s and 1940s, expanding with a juvenile section in the 1950s and 1960s. The construction of 58 houses in what was then a rural area of Dublin also increased the playing population. Tom Loftus was elected as Dublin County Board Chairman, a position he held from 1960 to 1968. The club won a Conlon Cup in the 1960s, but they struggled to field teams in the 1970s and 1980s with the juvenile section disbanding completely, meaning the supply of young players began to dry up.

=== Patrick Morans ===
Patrick Morans, originally known as Dun Laoghaire Commercials, was founded in 1920 and won a Dublin Intermediate Football Championship in its first year. The club played both football and hurling and at one stage were a senior hurling club. The club changed its name shortly afterwards to Patrick Morans in memory of a founding member. Patrick Moran from Boyle, Roscommon was involved in the 1916 Rising and in 1920 accused of assassination of a British army officer. He was jailed in Kilmainham and later hanged in Mountjoy jail in 1921. During his time in Kilmainham, Moran was offered a chance of escape with Frank Teeling, a player of the O’Tooles club, Ernie O’Malley and Simon Donnelly. But believing he had a sound alibi, Moran turned the opportunity down. A plaque was unveiled and a park named in his honour in 1966 by Éamon de Valera.

=== Amalgamation ===
Both Foxrock Geraldines and Patrick Morans decided to join forces in the early 1970s. Both clubs had been experiencing difficulties in fielding teams. They played senior hurling for three years before football became the dominant sport. The club won several leagues and cups in the 1970s and 1980s, but the absence of a juvenile section continued to experience difficulties in fielding. A juvenile section was started up in the 1990s and took part in the Wicklow league, however it was short-lived and had disbanded by 1996. The club won a football cup in 2000 but with the lack of players experienced a drop down the leagues. The juvenile section was eventually restarted and has grown to eight teams today. 2011 was to be a very successful year for the club in its 125th year of existence. The under 14 team won the Division 6 Football feile. The minor football team were division 4A runners up. The club won its first championship in 2011 in Junior Football, with one of Dublin's oldest clubs beating one of its newest, Tyrrelstown in the final.

== Honours ==
Cabinteely Geraldines

- Dublin Senior Football Championship Runners Up 1888, 1890

Foxrock Geraldines

- Junior Football League Winners 1907
- Conlon Cup Winners 1960

Dun Laoghire Commercials

- Dublin Intermediate Football Championship 1920

Geraldine Patrick Morans

- Football Cup 2000
- Dublin Division 6 Football Feile Winners (under 14) 2011
- Junior E Football Championship Winners 2011
- Dublin Minor Football League Division 4A Runners Up 2011
- Dublin Division 7 Football Feile Winners (under 14) 2017
- Dublin AFL Div. 5 Promotion 2023
- Dublin AFL Div. 7 Winners 2018
- Dublin AFL Div. 8 Promotion 2017
- Dublin AFL Div. 9 Promotion 2014
- Dublin AFL Div. 10S Winners 2013
