= 2005 Dublin Senior Football Championship =

Tournament details
- County: Dublin
- Year: 2005

Winners
- Champions: Kilmacud Crokes (5th win)

Kilmacud Crokes won the 2005 Dublin Senior Football Championship against Na Fianna. Kilmacud won by 1–12 to 0–9 against a Na Fianna side which came under new management with the loss of Paul Caffrey to the Dublin Senior Football Team.
