= Dublin Senior Football Championship =

Annual football competition

- Current season or competition: 2026 Dublin Senior Football Championship
- Irish: Craobh Shinsear Peile; Átha Cliath
- Founded: 1887
- Title holders: Cuala (2nd title)
- Most titles: St Vincent's (29 titles)
- Sponsors: Go-Ahead Ireland

The Dublin Senior Football Championship (currently known for sponsorship reasons as the PTSB Dublin Senior Football Championship) is an annual Gaelic Athletic Association competition between the top Dublin GAA clubs.

The winners of the Dublin Championship qualify to represent their county in the Leinster Senior Club Football Championship, the winners of which progress to the All-Ireland Senior Club Football Championship.

The 2026 Dublin champions are Cuala who defeated Castleknock in the final.

== History ==
The first Dublin Football Championship took place in 1887, Erin's Hope were the first Dublin Champions. St Vincent's have won the most titles, having won on twenty eight occasions.

There were no champions in 1902 as there was no Dublin Football Championship that year. The 1902 final was played in 1903, with Bray Emmets going on to represent Dublin and win the 1902 Leinster and All-Ireland Senior Football Championship representing Dublin (six Bray Emmets Players in all), a final which was played in 1904.

The Dublin senior football championship had received a dramatic revamp for 2006. A backdoor system was introduced and the new system was on a two-year trial which ended in 2007. A whole new system was introduced for the 2008 competition, the teams were divided into groups which were based on seeding from the previous year. The new system was to only involve the senior football championship. The backdoor system was restored for 2009 but was then removed in 2012. The new format included the introduction of a 'Senior B' championship. All the teams that lost in the first round were placed in a competition which was run in parallel to the 'A' Championship.

The Championship received another revamp in 2018 where the straight knock-out format was removed and replaced with a group format that contained 16 teams divided into 4 groups of four. The four teams who played in the semi-final the previous year were seeded and placed in separate groups while the other 12 teams were drawn into the remaining spots. Each team plays the 3 other teams in their group once and the teams that finish first and second within their groups qualify for the quarter-finals.

== Wins listed by club ==
#	Team	Wins	Years won	Last final lost
1	St Vincent's	29	1949, 1950, 1951, 1952, 1953, 1954, 1955, 1957,1958, 1959, 1960, 1961, 1962, 1964, 1966, 1967, 1970, 1971, 1972, 1975, 1976, 1977, 1981, 1984, 2007, 2013, 2014, 2016, 2017	2015
2	O'Tooles	11	1918, 1919, 1920, 1922, 1923, 1924, 1925, 1926, 1928, 1931, 1946	1964
2	Kilmacud Crokes	11	1992, 1994, 1998, 2004, 2005, 2008, 2010, 2018, 2021, 2022, 2023	2024
4	Geraldines	10	1898, 1899, 1908, 1910, 1914, 1915, 1917, 1940, 1941, 1942	1912
5	UCD	7	1943, 1963, 1965, 1973, 1974, 2002, 2006	1976
6	Parnells	6	1913, 1916, 1939, 1945, 1987, 1988	1991
7	Garda	5	1927, 1929, 1933, 1934, 1935	1955
8	Kickhams	5	1897, 1904, 1905, 1906, 1907	1925
8	Na Fianna	5	1969, 1979, 1999, 2000, 2001	2025
8	Young Irelands	5	1891, 1892, 1893, 1894, 1896	1890
8	Ballyboden St Enda's	5	1995, 2009, 2015, 2019, 2025	2023
11	Ballymun Kickhams	4	1982, 1985, 2012, 2020	2017
11	Erin's Hope	4	1887, 1932, 1956, 1978	1980
11	Clanna Gael	4	1936, 1937, 1948, 1968	1963
15	Thomas Davis	3	1989, 1990, 1991	2019
15	Isles of the Sea	3	1890, 1895, 1900	1892
15	Keatings	3	1903, 1909, 1911	1917
18	Erin's Isle	2	1993, 1997	1996
18	Civil Service	2	1944, 1980	1992
18	Seán McDermotts	2	1938, 1947	1967
18	Scoil Ui Chonaill	2	1983, 1986	1968
18	St Brigid's	2	2003, 2011	2010
18	Cuala	2	2024, 2026	1988
24	St. Sylvester's	1	1996	1997
24	Faughs	1	1889	
24	St Mary's	1	1921	1922
24	Feach McHughs	1	1888	
24	Bray Emmets	1	1901	
24	St. Joseph's	1	1930	1934

== Finals listed by year ==
Leinster and All-Ireland winners
Leinster winners and All-Ireland finalists
Leinster winners

Year	Winner	Score	Opponent	Score
2026	Cuala	3-15	Castleknock	1-06
2025	Ballyboden St Enda's	1-16	Na Fianna	1-12
2024	Cuala	0-14	Kilmacud Crokes	1-10
2023	Kilmacud Crokes	1-14	Ballyboden St Enda's	0-09
2022	Kilmacud Crokes	0-11	Na Fianna	0-10
2021	Kilmacud Crokes	1-07	St Jude's	1-06
2020	Ballymun Kickhams	1-19	Ballyboden St Enda's	0-08
2019	Ballyboden St Enda's	0-15	Thomas Davis	0-09
2018	Kilmacud Crokes	2-12	St Jude's	0-13
2017	St Vincent's	1-08	Ballymun Kickhams	0-08
2016	St Vincent's	0-15	Castleknock	0-10
2015	Ballyboden St Enda's	2-08	St Vincent's	0-10
2014	St Vincent's	0-14	St Oliver Plunketts Eoghan Ruadh	1-10
2013	St Vincent's	1-17, 1-09 (R)	Ballymun Kickhams	0-20, 1-08 (R)
2012	Ballymun Kickhams	1-12	Kilmacud Crokes	0-14
2011	St Brigid's	0-10	St Oliver Plunketts Eoghan Ruadh	0-08
2010	Kilmacud Crokes	2-12	St Brigid's	0-11
2009	Ballyboden St Enda's	2-12	St Jude's	1-13
2008	Kilmacud Crokes	1-10, 3-06 (R)	St Oliver Plunketts Eoghan Ruadh	0-13, 0-13 (R)
2007	St Vincent's	0-12	St Brigid's	1-07
2006	UCD	0-10	St Vincent's	0-09
2005	Kilmacud Crokes	1-14	Na Fianna	0-09
2004	Kilmacud Crokes	0-11	Ballyboden St Enda's	2-02
2003	St Brigid's	0-17	Kilmacud Crokes	1-08
2002	UCD	0-16	St Vincent's	1-06
2001	Na Fianna	3-15	St Brigid's	1-05
2000	Na Fianna	2-06	Kilmacud Crokes	1-08
1999	Na Fianna	1-13	St Brigid's	0-12
1998	Kilmacud Crokes	1-16	Na Fianna	0-13
1997	Erin's Isle	2-10	St. Sylvester's, Malahide	1-11
1996	St. Sylvester's, Malahide	0-11	Erin's Isle	0-09
1995	Ballyboden St Enda's	1-07	Erin's Isle	0-09
1994	Kilmacud Crokes	0-12, 1-14 (R)	Erin's Isle	1-09, 2-10 (R)
1993	Erin's Isle	0-08, 1-08 (R)	Kilmacud Crokes	1-05, 0-06 (R)
1992	Kilmacud Crokes	0-11	Civil Service	0-10
1991	Thomas Davis	1-09	Parnells	1-07
1990	Thomas Davis	0-10	Parnells	1-06
1989	Thomas Davis	2-10	Ballymun Kickhams	0-10
1988	Parnells	1-15	Cuala	0-12
1987	Parnells	0-12	St Anne's	0-08
1986	Scoil Ui Chonaill	0-09	Thomas Davis	0-01
1985	Ballymun Kickhams	2-07	Clontarf	0-08
1984	St Vincent's	1-08	Na Fianna	1-05
1983	Scoil Ui Chonaill	0-12	St Vincent's	1-06
1982	Ballymun Kickhams	2-11	Erin's Isle	1-08
1981	St Vincent's	0-12	Ballymun Kickhams	2-04
1980	Civil Service	3-09	Erin's Hope	2-08
1979	Na Fianna	0-11	Civil Service	0-09
1978	Erin's Hope	0-09, 3-07 (R)	Erin's Isle	1-06, 0-13 (R)
1977	St Vincent's	4-15	Synge Street PP	0-06
1976	St Vincent's	3-12	UCD	1-15
1975 ^{[a]}	St Vincent's	W/O	UCD	SCR
1974	UCD	0-12	St Vincent's	1-03
1973	UCD	1-11	St Vincent's	0-10
1972	St Vincent's	2-08	UCD	0-09
1971	St Vincent's	3-13	Craobh Chiaráin	3-03
1970	St Vincent's	1-11	Raheny	1-08
1969	Na Fianna	1-08	St Vincent's	0-10
1968	Clanna Gael	1-08	Scoil Ui Chonaill	0-05
1967	St Vincent's	2-16	Sean McDermotts	1-06
1966	St Vincent's	3-09	Sean McDermotts	2-06
1965	UCD	1-12	Round Towers	0-07
1964	St Vincent's	0-14	O'Toole's	1-07
1963	UCD	1-04, 2-12 (R)	Clanna Gael	0-07, 2-08 (R)
1962	St Vincent's	3-13	Clanna Gael	3-08
1961	St Vincent's	2-12	Air Corps	1-06
1960	St Vincent's	1-06	Air Corps	0-07
1959	St Vincent's	5-03	UCD	2-10
1958	St Vincent's	1-08	Sean McDermott's	1-05
1957	St Vincent's	2-13	Clanna Gael	1-04
1956	Erin's Hope	1-07	St Vincent's	0-07
1955	St Vincent's	4-04	Garda	1-07
1954	St. Vincent's	3-06	College of Pharmacy	2-01
1953	St Vincent's	2-05	Clanna Gael	0-06
1952	St Vincent's	1-10, 0-13 (R)	Garda	3-04, 1-08 (R)
1951	St Vincent's	1-06	Sean McDermott's	0-04
1950	St Vincent's	1-11	Parnells	1-03
1949	St Vincent's	4-11	Clanna Gael	2-05
1948	Clanna Gael	2-08	St Vincent's	2-03
1947	Sean McDermott's	0-11	Westerns	0-05
1946	O'Toole's	2-05, 1-06 (R)	Parnells	1-08, 1-05 (R)
1945	Parnells	0-10	Civil Service	1-04
1944	Civil Service	3-04	Peadar Mackens	1-01
1943	UCD	1-08	Sean McDermott's	1-06
1942	Geraldines	0-11	Peadar Mackens	0-08
1941	Geraldines	3-04	Parnells	0-01
1940	Geraldines	2-05	Sean McDermott's	1-06
1939	Parnells	1-02	Sean McDermott's	0-03
1938	Sean McDermott's	2-07	O'Toole's	1-05
1937 ^{[b]}	Clanna Gael	W/O	Sean McDermott's	SCR
1936	Clanna Gael	1-09	St Lawrence's	1-02
1935	Garda	2-07	O'Toole's	1-02
1934	Garda	3-08	St Joseph's	1-02
1933	Garda	1-11	UCD	1-03
1932	Erin's Hope	1-06	St Lawrence's	1-05
1931	O'Toole's	0-05, 1-08 (R)	Erin's Hope	0-05, 1-05 (R)
1930	St Joseph's	0-06, 2-03 (R)	O'Toole's	0-06, 1-05 (R)
1929	Garda	1-04	O'Toole's	0-04
1928	O'Toole's	2-09	O'Dwyer's	0-04
1927	Garda	3-04	O'Toole's	0-02
1926	O'Toole's	0-06	Garda	0-04
1925	O'Toole's	3-07	Kickhams	1-03
1924	O'Toole's	4-05	UCD	3-02
1923	O'Toole's	1-04	Garda	0-04
1922	O'Toole's	0-03, 1-02 (R)	St Mary's	0-03, 0-03 (R)
1921	St Mary's	1-05	Kickhams	0-03
1920	O'Toole's	1-02	Kickhams	0-01
1919	O'Toole's	1-07	McCrackens	0-02
1918	O'Toole's	1-06	Collegians	0-03
1917	Geraldines	3-04	Keatings	0-04
1916	Parnells	1-04	Hibernian Knights	0-06
1915	Geraldines	0-07	Parnells	0-01
1914	Geraldines	3-02	Parnells	0-02
1913	Parnells	2-03	Kickhams	2-02
1912	Kickhams	1-01	Geraldines	0-01
1911	Keatings	2-02	Geraldines	1-00
1910	Geraldines	0-07	Parnells	0-06
1909	Keatings	3-03	Geraldines	1-06
1908	Geraldines	0-05	Keatings	0-04
1907	Kickhams	0-11	Keatings	0-02
1906	Kickhams	0-08	Parnells	0-05
1905	Kickhams	0-05	Geraldines	0-04
1904	Kickhams	0-11	Isles of the Sea	0-02
1903	Keatings	0-07, 2-09 (R)	Geraldines	0-07, 0-05 (R)
1902	Championship Not Staged			
1901	Bray Emmets	0-11	Kickhams	0-06
1900	Isles of the Sea	1-05	Kickhams	1-04
1899	Geraldines	1-06, 1-12 (R)	Kickhams	0-09, 0-06 (R)
1898	Geraldines	4-13	Kickhams	1-04
1897 ^{[c]}	Kickhams	1-07, 2-08 (R)	Cabinteely Geraldines	0-08, 2-03
1896	Young Irelands	3-07	Lucan Sarsfields	0-03
1895	Isles of the Sea	W/O	Erin's Hope	SCR
1894	Young Irelands		Dolphins	
1893	Young Irelands			
1892	Young Irelands	3-02	Isles of the Sea	1-00
1891	Young Irelands	3-07	Sons of the Sea	0-03
1890	Isles of the Sea	0-05	Young Irelands	0-03
1889	Faughs	0-05	Raheny	0-01
1888	Feach McHughs	2-04	Cabinteely Geraldines	2-01
1887^{[d]}	Erin's Hope	1-20	Grocers Assistants	0-01

Notes

- ^{^[a]} UCD refused to play due to college examinations and St. Vincent's were declared champions.
- ^{^[b]} Sean McDermott's, insisting that they could only field a team for an afternoon throw-in rather than the scheduled eight o'clock in the evening start, conceded a walkover.
- ^{^[c]} Geraldines lodged an objection claiming Kickhams had played an unregistered player and a replay was ordered.
- ^{^[d]} score uncertain - all forfeit points included in score.

== Senior 2 ==
The second tier of the senior championship was first founded in 2016 (Senior B) and with St Oliver Plunkett's Eoghan Ruadh crowned champions. In 2017 the second tier competition was known as the Senior Football Championship Tournament and was won by Ballyboden St Enda's. In 2016 and 2017, the losers in the first round of the senior championship formed the years B championship.

In 2018, the senior football championship tournament changed name to the Senior 2 Championship. In 2018, the second tier was given a more permanent set-up. The second tier of the Dublin Championship became a proper second tier in 2018. The teams that were placed in Senior 2 can only leave the championship through promotion and relegation. Senior 2 champions gain promotion to Senior 1 and one side can also be relegated to the Dublin Intermediate football championship from 2019 onwards.

Year	Winner	Score	Opponent	Score
2026	St Brigid's	3=16 (4 pens)	St. Vincents	0-25 (2 pens)
2025	Skerries Harps	3-14	St Oliver Plunketts Eoghan Ruadh	1-17
2024	Whitehall Colmcille	0-12	Templeogue Synge Street	1-08
2023	Clontarf	0-12	Fingallians	1-08
2022	St. Vincents	1-08	St. Sylvesters	0-08
2021	Cuala	1-17	Templeogue Synge Street	2-11
2020	Cuala	0-14	St Brigid's	0-10
2019	Round Towers Lusk	3-21	Whitehall Colmcille	3-10
2018	Thomas Davis	4-11	St Mary's	1-07
2017	Ballyboden St Enda's	1-17	Raheny	1-16
2016	St Oliver Plunketts Eoghan Ruadh	0-12	Cuala	0-11
