= 2012 Dublin Senior Football Championship =

- 2012 Craobh Sinsear Peile; Bhaile Átha Cliath

Tournament details
- County: Dublin
- Year: 2012

Winners
- Champions: Ballymun Kickhams (3rd win)
- Manager: Paul Curran

Promotion/Relegation
- Promoted team(s): Cuala
- Relegated team(s): N/A

The 2012 Dublin Senior Football Championship was the inter club Gaelic football competition between the top teams in Dublin GAA. St Brigid's were the defending champions and Skerries Harps were the latest addition to the senior championship having won the Intermediate championship in 2011.

== First round ==
The winners of the first-round games went on to the second round and were drawn against the other winners of the first round. The losers of the first round entered a losers section of the second round.

UCD, Ballyboden St Enda's, Raheny, St Oliver Plunkett's-Eoghan Ruadh, Skerries Harps, St Vincent's, St Peregrine's, Kilmacud Crokes, Trinity Gaels, Na Fianna, Ballymun Kickham's, St Patrick's Palmerstown, Parnells, Templeogue Synge Street, St Brigid's and Lucan Sarsfields all went on to qualify for the winners section of the second round of the Dublin Championship. St Mary's, Ballinteer St John's, Thomas Davis, St Anne's, St Jude's, Fingal Ravens, Naomh Mearnóg, St Maur's, Clontarf, St Mark's, Erin's Isle, St Sylvester's, O'Tooles and Round Towers Clondalkin all progressed to the second round losers section.

Whitehall Colmcille received a bye for the second round losers section and therefore avoided relegation, progressing to the third round of the Dublin Championship.

| 16 May 2012; First Round | Round Towers, Clondalkin | 0-13 - 4-15 | St Oliver Plunkett's Eoghan Ruadh | Russell Park; Referee: P McCabe (Fingallians). |
| 16 May 2012; First Round | C Carty (0-1f), C Le Strange (0-3f), 0-4 each, I Ward 0-2, J Kelly, B Keane, L Connolly 0-1 each. | Report | J Sherlock 2-3, A Brogan 0-5, B Brogan 1-1, P McNulty 1-0, G Smith 0-3 (0-2f), A Moyles 0-2, M Brides 0-1. | Russell Park; Referee: P McCabe (Fingallians). |

| 16 May 2012; First Round | Ballinteer St John's | 1-15 - 2-13 | Lucan Sarsfields | Iveagh Grounds; Referee: T Lambe (St Vincents). |
| 16 May 2012; First Round | D OShaughnessy 1-2, Dan Gallagher 1-0, N Flynn 0-3 (0-1f), Dermot Gallagher 0-3 (0-2f), E ÓConghaile, M McCaffrey, D Quinn, S Newcome, S OShaughnessy 0-1 each. | Report | G Whelan 1-7 (1-0 pen, 0-2f), POCurry 0-2 (0-1f, 0-1 45), C Judge 0-2, P OConnor 0-2, F Duffy, S McCann 0-1 each. | Iveagh Grounds; Referee: T Lambe (St Vincents). |

| 18 May 2012; First Round | Skerries Harps | 1-08 - 0-05 | St Anne's | Rolestown; Referee: T Dennehy (Nh Mearnog). |
| 18 May 2012; First Round | H Dawson 0-4, D Reilly 1-1 (1-0 pen, 0-1f), M Boylan 0-2, G Cullen 0-1 each. | Report | D Watson 0-3(0-2f), D O'Keefe, S Cashin 0-1 each. | Rolestown; Referee: T Dennehy (Nh Mearnog). |

| 16 May 2012; First Round | Na Fianna | 3-12 - 0-06 | Fingal Ravens | Garristown; Referee: G Owen McMahon (Kilmacud Crokes). |
| 16 May 2012; First Round | P Quinn 0-4 (0-3f), D Quinn, B Downes 1-2 each, A Caffrey 1-1, D Coughlan, S Connell, K Duignan 0-1 each. | Report | D Keogh, C Prendeville, Darren Daly, N Tormey, D Kavanagh, Derek Daly 0-1 each. | Garristown; Referee: G Owen McMahon (Kilmacud Crokes). |

| 16 May 2012; First Round | Kilmacud Crokes | 1-15 - 0-10 | Naomh Maur | Newcastle; Referee: J Murray (Castleknock). |
| 16 May 2012; First Round | P Burke 0-5 (0-1f), P Mannion 0-3 (0-3f), B ORorke 1-0, D Kelleher, C Dias, L Óg Ó hÉineachain 0-2 each, C Dias, A Morrissey, B Hanamy 0-1 each. | Report | C Carthy 0-4 (0-4f), M McGrath 0-2, C McGuire, C Moore, R McGuire, V Whelan 0-1 each. | Newcastle; Referee: J Murray (Castleknock). |

| 16 May 2012; First Round | St Patrick's, Palmerstown | 0-22 - 1-06 | St Mark's | Kiltipper Road; Referee: J Fagan (Erins Isle). |
| 16 May 2012; First Round | A Glennon (0-2f) J Kelly (0-1f) 0-4 each, C Driver, G Kelly 0-3 each, B Carson 0-2, D Rushe, P Keaney, D Farren, F Maher, L Dunne, G Dunne 0-1 each. | Report | D Daley 1-0, D Cairns 0-3 (0-3f), S Galvin, M OMeara (0-1f), R Farrell 0-1 each. | Kiltipper Road; Referee: J Fagan (Erins Isle). |

| 17 May 2012; First Round | Trinity Gaels | 2-14 - 2-12 (AET) | Naomh Mearnóg | St Margarets; Referee: D Mc Kitterrick (Fingallians). |
| 17 May 2012; First Round | K Dillon 2-2, B OBrien 0-6 (0-4f), G Dillon 0-4, R Sheridan, D Sheridan 0-1 each. | Report | S McHale 1-3 (0-2f), B Colreavy 0-4, J Madden 1-1, A Kenny 0-2 (2f), F McGowan, M Gibbs 0-1 each. | St Margarets; Referee: D Mc Kitterrick (Fingallians). |

| 17 May 2012; First Round | St Brigid's | 1-18 - 0-14 | Thomas Davis | Parnell Park; Referee: G McCormack (Naomh Barróg). |
| 17 May 2012; First Round | K Darcy 0-5 (0-4f), P Ryan (0-1f), L McCarthy (0-3f) 0-4 each, S Supple 1-0 (1-0 pen), B Cahill, C Mullins 0-2 each, P Andrews 0-1. | Report | P Hudson 0-6 (0-5f), S McGrath 0-3, C Farrelly (0-1f), S Reilly 0-2 each, D Cawley 0-1. | Parnell Park; Referee: G McCormack (Naomh Barróg). |

| 17 May 2012; First Round | Ballymun Kickhams | 0-18 - 0-06 | Erin's Isle | Parnell Park; Referee: D Feeney (Parnells). |
| 17 May 2012; First Round | D Rock 0-11 (0-5f), K Leahy 0-3, A Hubbard 0-2, Derek Byrne, E Reilly 0-1 each. | Report | N Crossan 0-3 (0-2f), J Noonan, C Flynn, L Sweetman 0-1 each. | Parnell Park; Referee: D Feeney (Parnells). |

| 16 May 2012; First Round | Templeogue Synge Street | 1-15 - 2-09 | St. Sylvester's | O'Toole Park; Referee: P Carr (Round Tower, Clonalkin). |
| 16 May 2012; First Round | F OGara 0-7 (0-6f), D Bastick 1-0, E OGara 0-3, C Morley 0-2, C McKiernan, G Vickery, D Treanor 0-1 each. | Report | D Clarke 1-8 (0-5f), C Daly 1-0, N Dunne 0-1. | O'Toole Park; Referee: P Carr (Round Tower, Clonalkin). |

| 18 May 2012; First Round | UCD | 1-10 - 0-04 | Whitehall Colmcille | Blakestown Road; Referee: J King (Garda). |
| 18 May 2012; First Round | D Kingston 0-6 (0-4f), M OHanlon 1-0, L Keaney, M Dineen, D Larkin, C Downey 0-1 each. | Report | S Walsh 0-3 (0-2f), J Bridgeman 0-1. | Blakestown Road; Referee: J King (Garda). |

| 17 May 2012; First Round | Raheny | 1-11 - 0-09 | St Mary's, Saggart |
| 17 May 2012; First Round | D Henry 0-5 (0-3f), G Ivory 1-0, C Murphy, E Keogh 0-2 each, Stephen Swords, D Ryan 0-1 each. | Report | B Kelly 0-4 (3f), D Marshall 0-3 (0-1f), A Marshall, M Coyne 0-1 each. |

| 16 May 2012; First Round | O'Toole's | 0-07 - 0-12 | Parnells | Parnell Park; Referee: F McGreevy (St Oliver Plunketts/ER) |
| 16 May 2012; First Round | A Morris 0-3, C McStay, G Morris, D Mooney, C Mulligan 0-1 each. | Report | C Mortimer 0-5 (0-3f), J Murtagh 0-4 (0-2f), D Rooney, R Quinlivan, G Collins 0-1 each. | Parnell Park; Referee: F McGreevy (St Oliver Plunketts/ER) |

| 16 May 2012; First Round | Clontarf | 0-18 - 4-11 | St Peregrine's | Parnell Park; Referee: S Gahan (Erins Isle). |
| 16 May 2012; First Round | I ODwyer 0-9 (0-7f), P Synon 0-3, C Johnson 0-2 (0-1f), S Doyle, C Cronin, P Curran, J McCaffrey 0-1 each. | Report | R McCarthy 3-5, D Lynch 1-1, C OHara, C McGuinness 0-2, S Sweeney 0-1. | Parnell Park; Referee: S Gahan (Erins Isle). |

| 18 May 2012; First Round | St Vincent's | 1-08 - 0-10 | St Jude's | Newcastle; Referee: R Malone (St Mary’s, Saggart). |
| 18 May 2012; First Round | T Quinn 0-5 (0-2f), C Diamond 1-0, D Connolly 0-3 (1f). | Report | DA Donnelly 0-4 (3f), E Dalton, B McManamon (1f) 0-2 each, C Murphy, P Maguire 0-1 each. | Newcastle; Referee: R Malone (St Mary’s, Saggart). |

- Ballyboden St. Enda's - BYE

== Second round ==
The second round was divided into two sections, the losers and winners sections. The winning teams in the losers section went on to qualify for the third round of the championship while the losers of the losers section entered the relegation championship and the fight for their senior status. The losers of the winners section qualified for the third round and played the winners of the second round losers section. The winners of the winners section went on to qualify for the fourth round where they met the winners of the third round. UCD, Templeogue Synge Street and Na Fianna all progressed to the fourth round of the Dublin championship.

| 2012; Winners section | UCD | 1-13 - 2-07 | Ballyboden St Enda's | Iveagh Grounds; Referee: T Lambe (St Vincent's). |
| 2012; Winners section | D Kingston 1-7 (1-0 pen, 0-5f), N Kilroy (f), C Boyle, C Downey, A Giles, C Kelly, A Murphy 0-1 each. | Report | D O'Mahony 1-1, D O'Reilly 1-0, R Basquel 0-2 (1f), C Dooley ('45'), K Naughton (f), I Clarke, C Smyth 0-1 each. | Iveagh Grounds; Referee: T Lambe (St Vincent's). |

| 2012; Winners section | Raheny | 1-08 - 1-11 | St Oliver Plunkett's Eoghan Ruadh | Parnell Park; Referee: T Dennehy (Nh Mearnóg). |
| 2012; Winners section | D Henry 1-4 (0-3f), G Ivory 0-2, E Keogh, E Delaney 0-1 each. | Report | D Lally 1-1, B Brogan 0-4 (2f), C Walsh 0-3, G Smith 0-2 (1f), A Brogan 0-1. | Parnell Park; Referee: T Dennehy (Nh Mearnóg). |

| 2012; Winners section | Skerries Harps | 1-03 - 3-12 | St Vincent's | Parnell Park; Referee: G McCormack (Naomh Barróg). |
| 2012; Winners section | J Smith 1-0, H Dawson 0-3 (2f). | Report | T Quinn 1-3 (0-1f, 0-1 45), C Diamond 1-2, T Diamond 1-1, D Connolly 0-3 (1f), S Carthy 0-2, M Loftus 0-1. | Parnell Park; Referee: G McCormack (Naomh Barróg). |

| 2012; Winners section | St Peregrine's | 0-06 - 3-19 | Kilmacud Crokes | Parnell Park; Referee: K Roche (Whitehall Colmcille). |
| 2012; Winners section | R McCarthy 0-6 (3f). | Report | D Kelleher 1-4; P Burke 1-2 (0-1f), R Cosgrove 1-1, B ORorke (0-1f), A Morrissey (0-1f) 0-4 each, P Mannion 0-2, L Óg Ó hEineachain, C Dias 0-1 each. | Parnell Park; Referee: K Roche (Whitehall Colmcille). |

| 2012; Winners section | Trinity Gaels | 1-08 - 2-17 | Na Fianna | St Margaret's; Referee: B Tiernan (O'Dwyer's). |
| 2012; Winners section | D Kelly 1-4 (0-2f), G Dillon, K Dillon 0-2 each. | Report | D Quinn 1-5, JJ Martin 1-1, P Quinn (2f), C Duignan (1f) 0-4 each, B Downes 0-2, E Connolly 0-1. | St Margaret's; Referee: B Tiernan (O'Dwyer's). |

| 2012; Winners section | Ballymun | 3-11 - 0-01 | St Patrick's, Palmerstown | O'Toole Park; Referee: A Cummins (Round Tower, Clondalkin). |
| 2012; Winners section | D Rock 0-5 (4f), C Weir, J Whelan 1-1 each, S Forde 1-0, F Andrews 0-3, J Small 0-1. | Report | A Glennon 0-1 (f). | O'Toole Park; Referee: A Cummins (Round Tower, Clondalkin). |

| 2012; Winners section | Parnell's | 0-12 - 2-10 | Templeogue Synge Street | O'Toole Park; Referee: R Malone (St Mary's Saggart). |
| 2012; Winners section | MJ Tierney 0-5 (4f), J Murtagh 0-4 (2f), D Rooney 0-2, J Bealin 0-1. | Report | E O'Gara 1-4, N Scully 1-2 (0-1f), D Bastick 0-3, C Morley 0-1. | O'Toole Park; Referee: R Malone (St Mary's Saggart). |

| 2012; Winners section | St. Brigid's | 3-11 - 1-10 | Lucan Sarsfields | Parnell Park; Referee: S McCarthy (St Vincents). |
| 2012; Winners section | P Ryan 2-0, O McCann 1-0, K Darcy (0-1f), P Andrews 0-3, L McCarthy (0-1f), C Mullins 0-2, J OLoughlin 0-1. | Report | Dermot Gallagher 0-6 (0-5f), B Collopy 1-1 (0-1f), E Ó Conghaile 0-2, K Fitzgerald 0-1. | Parnell Park; Referee: S McCarthy (St Vincents). |

| 2012; Losers section | Round Towers, Clondalkin | 1-10 - 0-16 | St Mary's | Newcastle. Referee: B O'Shea (St Mark's). |
| 2012; Losers section | L Connolly 1-0, C Lestrange 0-3 (0-3f), C Carthy 0-2, C Corrigan, Derek Murray, I Ward, B Keane, C McGrath 0-1 each. | Report | Blaine Kelly 0-6 (0-1f), S Walsh 0-3, C Broderick, D Marshall (0-1f) 0-2 each, S Kelly, D Corrigan, G Murray 0-1 each. | Newcastle. Referee: B O'Shea (St Mark's). |

| 2012; Losers section | Ballinteer St John's | 0-13 - 2-09 | Thomas Davis | O'Toole Park; Referee: J King (Garda). |
| 2012; Losers section | P O'Curry 0-3, P O'Connor, G Whelan (1f), R Gaughan, F Duffy 0-2, S McCann, N Devereux 0-1 each. | Report | S Reilly 2-2, P Hudson 0-2 (1f), J O'Reilly, P Boland, E Kirby, C Farrelly, D Cawley 0-1 each. | O'Toole Park; Referee: J King (Garda). |

| 2012; Losers section | St Anne's | 1-04 - 1-16 | St Jude's | Kiltipper Road; Referee: S Rutherford (Ballyboden St Endas). |
| 2012; Losers section | D Gallagher 0-7 (0-4f), E Dalton 1-1, D Donnelly, P Cunningham 0-2 each; J Donnelly, B McManamon, C Murphy, R Joyce 0-1 each. | Report | S Fulham 1-1 (0-1f), N Bergin, P Robinson, D Watson 0-1 each. | Kiltipper Road; Referee: S Rutherford (Ballyboden St Endas). |

| 2012; Losers section | Fingal Ravens | 0-12 - 1-10 | Naomh Mearnóg | the Naul; Referee: F Shanahan (St Margaret's). |
| 2012; Losers section | N Tormey, A Casey (2f) 0-3 each, I Kavanagh, C McGrath, M White, D Daly, I Kavanagh, D Flanagan 0-1 each. | Report | R OSullivan 1-3, S Carthy 0-4 (2f), A Kenny 0-2, J Madden 0-1. | the Naul; Referee: F Shanahan (St Margaret's). |

| 2012; Losers section | St Maur's | 5-13 - 0-06 | Clontarf | Garristown; Referee: D McKitterick (Fingalllians). |
| 2012; Losers section | C McGuire 3-2, C Carthy 0-6 (1f), C Sweetman 1-2, D Carrick 1-1, M McGrath, D Byrne 0-1 each. | Report | C Johnston 0-3 (0-2f, 0-1 45), P Sylon, C McConnell (f), R McCullough 0-1 each. | Garristown; Referee: D McKitterick (Fingalllians). |

| 2012; Losers section | St Mark's | 2-07 - 1-11 | Erin's Isle | Referee: T Clarke (Lucan Sarsfields). |
| 2012; Losers section | J Kelly 1-1, G Browne 1-0, P Murphy 0-3 (0-2f), S Tynan 0-2, F Morris 0-1. | Report | N Crossan 0-7 (0-3f), A Whelan 1-0, G OConnell, L Sweetman 0-2 each, C Pike 0-1. St | Referee: T Clarke (Lucan Sarsfields). |

| 13 June 2012; Losers section | Sylvester's | 3-19 - 0-04 | O'Toole's | Drumnigh; Referee: D Deasy (Ballymun Kickhams). |
| 13 June 2012; Losers section | D Clarke 1-6 (0-3f), C Daly 2-1, M Brennan 0-5, G Sweeney 0-4, A Relihan 0-2, A Hartnett 0-1. | Report | A Morris 0-2 (2f), M Healy (f) D Mooney 0-1 each. | Drumnigh; Referee: D Deasy (Ballymun Kickhams). |

- Whitehall Colmcille get a BYE

== Third round ==
The second round winners of the losers section were paired against the losers of the winners section for the third round of the championship. Lucan Sarsfields, St Peregrine's, Trinity Gaels, Whitehall Colmcille, St Mary's Saggart, Skerries Harps, Naomh Mearnóg and Raheny were knocked out of the Dublin championship in September 2012, to return in 2013.

Ballyboden St Enda's, Parnell's, Thomas Davis, St Pat's Palmerstown, St Maur's and Erin's Isle all won their respective third round ties and progressed to the fourth round stage of the competition.

| 15 September 2012; 18:00; Third Round | St Patrick's (P) | 0-13 - 0-10 | St Mary's (S) | Newcastle; Referee: J King (Garda) |
| 15 September 2012; 18:00; Third Round | A Glennon 0-6 (0-4f), J Kelly 0-3 (0-1f), R Carson 0-2, B OHanlon, C Driver 0-1 each. | Report | E Murray 0-3 (0-3f), C Broderick, D McConn 0-2 each, S Walsh, D Marshall (0-1f), B Kelly 0-1 each. | Newcastle; Referee: J King (Garda) |

| 15 September 2012; 18:00; Third Round | Skerries Harps | 2-07 - 1-15 | Thomas Davis | Blakestown; Referee: P Fitzsimons (Liffey Gaels) |
| 15 September 2012; 18:00; Third Round | G Cullen 2-1, H Dawson 0-4 (0-2f), J Smith, B Cullen 0-1 each. | Report | P Hudson 0-7 (0-1f), S McGrath 0-4, C Galvin 1-0, S Reilly 0-2, J OReilly, A Fallon 0-1 each. | Blakestown; Referee: P Fitzsimons (Liffey Gaels) |

| 13 September 2012; 19:30; Third Round | Lucan Sarsfields | 0-10 - 0-13 | St Jude's | Newcastle; Referee: T Lambe (St Vincent's). |
| 13 September 2012; 19:30; Third Round | E Ó Conghaile, D OShaughnessy, D Gallagher (0-2f), B O’Neill 0-2 each, T Brennan (0-1f), B Collopy 0-1 each. | Report | D Gallagher (0-2f) 0-4, B McManamon, R Joyce 0-3 each, K McManamon 0-2, A Glover 0-1. | Newcastle; Referee: T Lambe (St Vincent's). |

| 15 September 2012; 18:00; Third Round | Ballyboden St Enda's | 1-14 - 3-07 | Naomh Mearnóg | O'Toole Park; Referee: F McGreevy (St Oliver Plunketts/ER). |
| 15 September 2012; 18:00; Third Round | A Kerin 0-4 (0-3f), R Basquel (0-1f), S Lambert (0-2 45), M McCabe 0-3, D OReilly 1-0, D Nelson 0-1. | Report | S Kenny 2-0, R OSullivan 1-0, S McHale (0-2f), K OBrien (0-1f) 0-2, J Dolan, B Colreavy, F McGowan 0-1 each. | O'Toole Park; Referee: F McGreevy (St Oliver Plunketts/ER). |

| 14 September 2012; 19:30; Third Round | Trinity Gaels | 0-15 - 6-11 | St. Maur's | St Margarets; Referee: T McCarthy (St Vincent's). |
| 14 September 2012; 19:30; Third Round | Brendan OBrien 0-7 (0-6f), G Dillon, C Reilly (0-1f), G Trimble 0-2 each, R Monaghan, D Kelly 0-1 each. | Report | D Byrne, C McGuire 2-0 each, C Carthy 0-5 (0-4f), C Reddin 1-1, D Carrick 1-0, R McGuire 0-2, M Reilly, B Horgan, S McGuinness 0-1 each. | St Margarets; Referee: T McCarthy (St Vincent's). |

| 13 September 2012; 20:15; Third Round | Raheny | 0-05 - 5-12 | St Sylvester's | Parnell Park; Referee: R Malone (St Mary's, Saggart) |
| 13 September 2012; 20:15; Third Round | E Delaney (0-2f), D Ryan (0-1f), Sean Swords, E Keogh (0-1 45) 0-1 each. | Report | N Dunne 3-1, C Daly 2-2, M McCarthy 0-6 (0-3f), S OConnor 0-2, J Coughlan 0-1. | Parnell Park; Referee: R Malone (St Mary's, Saggart) |

| 14 September 2012; 18:45; Third Round | Parnells | 0-17 - 0-07 | Whitehall Colmcille | Parnell Park; Referee: B O'Shea (St Mark's) |
| 14 September 2012; 18:45; Third Round | J Murtagh 0-7 (0-3f), C Mortimer 0-5 (0-2f), MJ Tierney, J Dignam 0-2 each, A Shore 0-1. | Report | S Sharpe (0-1f), L ODonovan 0-3 each, D Redmond 0-1. | Parnell Park; Referee: B O'Shea (St Mark's) |

| 14 September 2012; 18:45; Third Round | St Peregrine's | 0-09 - 0-20 | Erin's Isle | Parnell Park; Referee: K Roche (Whitehall Colmcille) |
| 14 September 2012; 18:45; Third Round | N Crossan 0-10 (0-5f), L Sweetman, J Noonan 0-3 each, D Fegan 0-2, C MacAodhaine, C Flynn 0-1 each. | Report | R McCarthy 0-3 (0-2f), C McGuinness (0-2f), S Lowndes 0-2 each, C OHara, C Lowndes 0-1 each. | Parnell Park; Referee: K Roche (Whitehall Colmcille) |

== Last Sixteen ==
The fourth round consists of the winners of the second round winners section who are drawn against the winners of the third round. This round consists of the last 16 remaining teams in the Dublin Championship for 2012. Second round winners UCD, Templeogue Synge Street, Na Fianna, St Vincent's, Ballymun Kickhams, St Oliver Plunkett's-Eoghan Ruadh, Kilmacud Crokes and St Brigid's were drawn against the third round winners Ballyboden St Enda's, Parnells, Thomas Davis, St Pat's Palmerstown, St Maur's, Erin's Isle, St Sylvester's and St Jude's. St Judes, Na Fianna, Ballymun Kickhams, St Brigid's, St Sylvester's, Templeogue Synge Street, Kilmacud Crokes and St Vincent's qualified for the quarter-finals; St Oliver Plunkett's-Eoghan Ruadh, UCD, Erin's Isle, Parnell's, Thomas Davis, Ballyboden St Enda's, St Pat's Palmerstown and St Maur's were knocked out during round four.

| 5 October 2012; 18:45; Round 4 | Erin’s Isle | 1-12 - 2-16 | Na Fianna | Parnell Park; Referee: G McCormack (Naomh Barróg) |
| 5 October 2012; 18:45; Round 4 | N Crossan 0-7 (2f), L Sweetman 1-1, P Murray 0-2, D Feagan, J Noonan 0-1 each. | Report | P Quinn 1-6 (0-5f), C OConnor 1-1, J Cooper, D Quinn 0-2 each, E Connolly, B Downes, A Caffrey, S Connell, S Coughlan 0-1 each. | Parnell Park; Referee: G McCormack (Naomh Barróg) |

| October 2012; 15:30; Round 4 | Templeogue Synge St | 2-11 - 2-11 | St Patrick's, Palmerstown | O'Toole Park; Referee: P Fitzsimons (Liffey Gaels) |
| October 2012; 15:30; Round 4 | N Scully 0-5 (4f), G Vickery, E O’Gara 1-0 each, A O’Brien 0-2 (2f), D Bastick ('45), F Coffey, C Morley, C Byrne 0-1 each. | Report | A Glennon 1-5 (1-0 pen, 0-4f), G Kelly 1-1, B Carson 0-2 (1f), B O’Hanlon, P Keaney, C Driver 0-1 each. | O'Toole Park; Referee: P Fitzsimons (Liffey Gaels) |

| 6 October 2012; 17:00; Round 4 | St Oliver Plunkett’s/Eoghan Ruadh | 2-06 - 1-13 | St Sylvester's | Parnell Park; Referee: R Malone (St Mary's, Saggart) |
| 6 October 2012; 17:00; Round 4 | A Darcy 1-2, G Smith 1-1 (0-1f), D Lally, C Dunleavy, B Brogan (0-1f) 0-1 each. | Report | M McCarthy 1-6 (0-2f), D Clarke 0-3 (0-3f), G McArdle, N Dunne, E Fanning, R Cleere 0-1 each. | Parnell Park; Referee: R Malone (St Mary's, Saggart) |

| October 2012; Round 4 | Ballymun Kickham's | 1-14 - 0-13 | Parnell’s | Parnell Park; Referee: B O'Shea (St Mark's) |
| October 2012; Round 4 | D Rock 0-5 (0-1f, 0-1 pen), T Furman 1-2, E Reilly 0-3, A Hubbard, J Whelan, J McCarthy, K Leahy 0-1 each. | Report | J Murtagh 0-6 (0-2f, 0-1 sideline), C Mortimer (0-1f) 0-5, C Begley, R Quinlivan 0-1 each. | Parnell Park; Referee: B O'Shea (St Mark's) |

| 4 October 2012; 19:30; Round 4 | St Vincent's | 2-16 - 1-07 | St Maur’s | Swords; Referee: J King (Garda) |
| 4 October 2012; 19:30; Round 4 | T Quinn 1-6 (0-5f), D Connolly 1-3 (0-1f), C Diamond 0-2 (1f), E Fennell, R Trainor, D Russell, N Billings, K Golden 0-1 each. | Report | C Carthy 0-4 (2f), C McGuire 1-0, C Moore, D Carrick, R Kelly 0-1 each. | Swords; Referee: J King (Garda) |

| October 2012; Round 4 | St Brigid's | 2-12 - 1-08 | Thomas Davis | Parnell Park; Referee: S McCarthy (St Vincent's) |
| October 2012; Round 4 | P Andrews 1-2, B Cahill 1-0, L McCarthy (0-1f), J OLoughlin 0-3 each, S Supple (0-1f), C Kilmurray (0-1f), O McCann, G McIntyre 0-1 each. | Report | C Farrelly 1-2, P Hudson 0-3 (0-2f), S McGrath 0-2, D Ryan 0-1. | Parnell Park; Referee: S McCarthy (St Vincent's) |

| 3 October 2012; 19:30; Round 4 | UCD | 1-07 - 1-09 | St Jude’s | Iveagh Grounds; Referee: J Rutherford (Ballyboden St Enda's) |
| 3 October 2012; 19:30; Round 4 | D Larkin 1-1, D Kingston 0-2 (0-2f), M O’Hanlon, K Dyas, N Murray, M O’Regan (0-1 ‘45’) 0-1 each. | Report | D Donnelly 0-3 (0-1f), A Glover 1-0, B McManamon 0-2 (0-1f), P Maguire 0-2, K McManamon, C Guckian 0-1 each. | Iveagh Grounds; Referee: J Rutherford (Ballyboden St Enda's) |

| 6 October 2012; Round 4 | Kilmacud Crokes | 0-14 - 2-08 | Ballyboden St Enda’s | O'Toole Park; Referee: K Tighe (St Anne's) |
| 6 October 2012; Round 4 | M Vaughan 0-5 (0-4f), C O’Sullivan 0-4, P Mannion (0-1f), C Dias 0-2 each, P Burke 0-1. | Report | A Kerin 2-3 (1-0 pen, 0-3f), C Keaney 0-3 (0-3f), B Dwane, D Davey 0-1 each. | O'Toole Park; Referee: K Tighe (St Anne's) |

| 10 October 2012; Round 4 Replay | Templeogue Synge Street | 1-17 - 1-06 | St Patrick's, Palmerstown | Parnell Park; Referee: S Gahan (Erin's Isle) |
| 10 October 2012; Round 4 Replay | N Scully 0-6 (5f), M Hiney 1-2, C Morley, E OGara, A OBrien 0-3 each. | Report | A Glennon 1-4 (0-3f), R Carson, G Kelly 0-1 each. | Parnell Park; Referee: S Gahan (Erin's Isle) |

| 10 October 2012; Round 4 Replay | Kilmacud Crokes | 1-10 - 0-08 | Ballyboden St. Enda's | Parnell Park; Referee: D Feeney (Parnell's) |
| 10 October 2012; Round 4 Replay | P Mannion 0-5 (0-2 ‘45s’), P Burke 1-1, C Dias, A Morrissey, M Vaughan, L Óg Ó hEineacháin 0-1 each. | Report | C Keaney 0-4 (0-2f), A Kerin 0-2 (0-2f), B Dwane, S Lambert 0-1 each. | Parnell Park; Referee: D Feeney (Parnell's) |

== Last Eight ==
The quarter finals of the Dublin Championship consisted of the eight winners of the fourth round. The games were to be played on the weekend of 14 October. The St Brigid's game was cancelled and rescheduled for 17 October 2012 due to the untimely death of Seamus Bonner. The Kilmacud Crokes was also brought forward to the 17th due to their hurling side appearing in the Dublin senior hurling championship final on the same weekend as 14 October. Na Fianna, St Sylvester's, Templeogue Synge Street and St Vincent's were knocked out at the quarter-final stage. St Jude's, St Brigid's, Kilmacud Crokes and Ballymun Kickham's progressed to the last four of the competition.

| 17 October 2012; Quarter-final | St Brigid's | 1-14 - 2-09 | Templeogue Synge Street | Parnell Park; Referee: T Lambe (St Vincents). |
| 17 October 2012; Quarter-final | P Andrews 0-6, J OLoughlin, K Darcy (2f) 0-3 each, B Cahill 1-0, G Norton, E McGuire 0-1 each. | Report | E OGara 1-2, D Bastick 1-1, N Scully 0-3 (1f), C Morley, A OBrien 0-1, C OReilly 0-1 each. | Parnell Park; Referee: T Lambe (St Vincents). |

| 17 October 2012; Quarter-final | Kilmacud Crokes | 1-06 - 0-06 | St Sylvester's | Parnell Park; Referee: G McCormack (Naomh Barróg) |
| 17 October 2012; Quarter-final | P Mannion 1-2, M Vaughan 0-3 (2f, 1 45), C Dias 0-1. | Report | M McCarthy (2f), D Clarke (1f) 0-2 each, N Dunne, C Daly 0-1 each. | Parnell Park; Referee: G McCormack (Naomh Barróg) |

| 12 October 2012; Quarter-final | Ballymun Kickhams | 0-14 - 1-10 | St Vincents | Parnell Park; Referee: B O'Shea (St Mark's). |
| 12 October 2012; Quarter-final | D Rock 0-9 (0-8f), K Leahy 0-2, J Whelan, T Furman, Derek Byrne 0-1 each. | Report | T Quinn 0-6 (0-3f), D Connolly 0-3 (0-1f), D O Murchú 1-0, S Carthy 0-1. | Parnell Park; Referee: B O'Shea (St Mark's). |

| 12 October 2012; Quarter-final | St Jude's | 1-13 0-14 | Na Fianna | Parnell Park; Referee: S McCarthy (St Vincent's) |
| 12 October 2012; Quarter-final | D Donnelly 1-2, E Dalton 0-4, B McManamon (0-2f), K McManamon, R Joyce 0-2 each, A Glover 0-1 each. | Report | A Caffrey 0-5 (0-4f), P Quinn 0-4 (0-2f), J Cooper 0-2, S Connell (0-1f), N McGovern (0-1 45), D Quinn 0-1 each. | Parnell Park; Referee: S McCarthy (St Vincent's) |

== Last Four ==
| 21 October 2012; 16:00; Semi-final | St Jude's | 1-07 - 1-16 | Ballymun Kickham's | Parnell Park; Referee: G McMahon (O'Dwyers) |
| 21 October 2012; 16:00; Semi-final | D Donnelly 1-1, K McManamon (1f), D Gallagher 0-2 each, B McManamon, R Joyce 0-1 each. | Report | T Furman 1-3, D Rock 0-4 (2f, 1 s), K Leahy 0-3, Derek Byrne 0-2, J McCarthy, E Reilly, S Forde, A OBrien 0-1 each. | Parnell Park; Referee: G McMahon (O'Dwyers) |

| 21 October 2012; 14:15; Semi-final | Kilmacud Crokes | 2-18 - 2-12 | St Brigid's | Parnell Park; Referee: Seán Gahan (Erin's Isle) |
| 21 October 2012; 14:15; Semi-final | A Morrissey (2f), P Mannion (3f) 0-6 each, P Burke, C OSullivan 1-0 each, B ORorke 0-2, D Magee, C Dias, M Vaughan (0-1f), S Williams 0-1 each. | Report | P Andrews 1-2, K Darcy 0-3 (2f), C Kilmurray 1-0, J OLoughlin, B Cahill 0-2 each, C Mullins, K Bonner, L McCarthy (f) 0-1 each. | Parnell Park; Referee: Seán Gahan (Erin's Isle) |

== The Final ==
| 29 October 2012; Final | Kilmacud Crokes | 0-14 - 1-12 | Ballymun Kickhams | Parnell Park; Referee: S Gahan (Erin's Isle) |
| 29 October 2012; Final | P Mannion (1f), P Burke 0-4 each, M Vaughan 0-3 (1f), K Nolan, C Dias, D Kelleher 0-1 each. | Report | D Rock 0-7 (1f, 1 45), J Whelan 0-3 (1f), S Forde 1-0, K Leahy, T Furman 0-1 each. | Parnell Park; Referee: S Gahan (Erin's Isle) |

== Relegation Championship ==
Each winning team in the relegation championship avoids potential relegation. The relegation championship works in the opposite way to a normal championship. It is the aim of each team to exit the relegation championship and the only way to do this is by beating the opposition. Only losing teams progress to the successive rounds of the relegation championship. Any team that remains a losing side for the entire duration of the championship can be relegated to the Dublin Intermediate Football Championship although, if the winners of the Intermediate championship already have a team in the senior championship, they are not promoted and no team is relegated. Although, in the case of 2012, no team will be relegated due to a decision to increase the Dublin senior football championship from 31 teams to 32 teams.

St Anne's, St Mark's, Clontarf, O'Toole's, Ballinteer St John's, Fingal Ravens and Round Towers Clondalkin were due to compete in the 2012 relegation championship but the games were cancelled.
