= 2014 Dublin Senior Football Championship =

- 2014 Craobh Sinsear Peile; Bhaile Átha Cliath

Tournament details
- County: Dublin
- Year: 2014

Winners
- Champions: St. Vincent's (27th win)
- Manager: Tommy Conroy
- Captain: Ger Brennan

Promotion/Relegation
- Promoted team(s): Castleknock
- Relegated team(s): Trinity Gaels

St. Vincent's won the Championship for the second year in a row beating St. Oliver Plunkett's Eoghan Ruadh in the final on 27 October 2014 at a packed Parnell Park. The 2014 Dublin Senior Football Championship was the top club championship competition on the Dublin GAA calendar for 2014. The championship was changed since 2012, with a backdoor system no longer in place, meaning that the championship was played on a knockout basis. All teams knocked out in the first round of the Dublin championship are entered into the Dublin Senior B Championship. St. Maur's were eventual B Championship winners.

== Round 1 ==
First Round	St. Sylvester's	1-09 - 0-09	Naomh Maur	Naul
First Round	A Foy 1-2, M McCarthy 0-3 (0-2f), R Hazley, S Cunningham, J Coughlan E Fanning 0-1 each.	Report	C McGuire 0-3 (0-1f), Cathal Sweetman 0-2, D Carrick, K Watson, V Whelan (0-1f), C Reddin 0-1 each.	Naul

First Round	Whitehall Colmcille	2-12 - 2-10	Erin's Isle	Balgriffin; Referee: A McAlister (Starlights).
First Round	F Byrne 0-5 (0-2f), E O'Donnell 1-1, S Dwyer 1-0, S Sharpe 0-2 (0-1f), B Mulligan, S Ryan, P Corry, J Bridgeman 0-1 each.	Report	J Noonan 1-3 (1-0 pen), C Whelan 1-1, C Pike 0-2, K Nicholson, L Sweetman, G Nugent, G Bedford (0-1 '45') 0-1 each.	Balgriffin; Referee: A McAlister (Starlights).

First Round	Fingal Ravens	0-11 - 0-10	Round Tower's, Clondalkin	St. David's Artane; Referee: P McCabe (Fingallians).
First Round	A Casey (0-2f), N Tormey (0-2f), C Norton 0-3 each, E O'Flaherty, L Griffin 0-1 each.	Report	C Corrigan 0-6 (0-1f), C Carthy 0-2, E Finn, C Le Strange 0-1 each.	St. David's Artane; Referee: P McCabe (Fingallians).

First Round	Ballinteer St. John's	3-13 - 2-10	O'Toole's	O'Toole Park; Referee: J Murray (Castleknock).
First Round	A Clabby 1-3 (0-1f), F Duffy 0-5 (0-3f), P Cronin, N Devereux 1-0, G Whelan, R Gaughan 0-2, J Oliver 0-1.	Report	R Bergin (0-1f), G O’Meara 1-2, A Morris 0-4 (0-2f), M Cunningham, D Hoare (‘45’) 0-1 each.	O'Toole Park; Referee: J Murray (Castleknock).

First Round	Ballyboden St. Enda's	6-23 - 0-10	Trinity Gaels	Finglas; Referee: D Sheppard (Rd Tower, Lusk).
First Round	A Kerin 1-7 (0-2f), MD McAuley, R Cleary 2-2 each, D O’Reilly 1-4, K Naughton (0-1f), C Dunne 0-2 each, D Nelson, T Hannifin, D O’Mahony, B Dwayne 0-1 each.	Report	B O’Brien 0-8 (0-6f), G Dillon 0-2.	Finglas; Referee: D Sheppard (Rd Tower, Lusk).

First Round	St. Oliver Plunkett's Eoghan Ruadh	3-10 - 2-11	Kilmacud Crokes	Clondalkin; Referee: R Malone (St Mary’s, Saggart).
First Round	B Brogan 2-4 (0-3f), G Smith 1-4 (1-0 pen, 0-2f), L Herron, A Brogan 0-1 each.	Report	P Mannion 1-3 (0-1f), P Burke 1-1 (0-1f), M Vaughan 0-2 (1f), R McGowan, B McGrath, D Kelleher, L óg Ó hÉineacháin, S Cunningham 0-1 each.	Clondalkin; Referee: R Malone (St Mary’s, Saggart).

First Round	Raheny	2-14 - 1-11	St. Peregrine's	St. Margaret's; Referee: G McCormack (Naomh Barróg).
First Round	G Ivory (0-3f), D Ryan (0-1f) 0-4 each, G Coady, C Heapes 1-0 each, B Fenton 0-3, E Keogh 0-2, R Real 0-1.	Report	R McCarthy 0-8 (0-5f), D Whelan 1-0, S Lowndes 0-2 (0-1 '45'), C Lowndes 0-1.	St. Margaret's; Referee: G McCormack (Naomh Barróg).

First Round	Skerries Harps	2-10 - 0-10	UCD	O'Toole Park; Referee: P Fitzsimons (Liffey Gaels).
First Round	H Dawson 1-4 (1-0 pen, 0-3f), P Cashman 1-2, B Cullen, M Boylan 0-2 each.	Report	L Kelly (3f), J McEntee 0-5 each	O'Toole Park; Referee: P Fitzsimons (Liffey Gaels).

First Round	Lucan Sarsfields	1-07 - 1-05	Parnell's	Blakestown Road; Referee: J King (Garda).
First Round	B Gallagher 1-4 (0-3f), A Hope 0-2, P Casey 0-1.	Report	J Dignam 0-5 (0-5f), D Joyce 1-0 (1-0 pen).	Blakestown Road; Referee: J King (Garda).

First Round	Templeogue Synge Street	0-14 - 1-05	St. Mary's	Kiltipper Road; Referee: D O’Donovan (St Mark’s).
First Round	D Bastick, T Coyne (0-3f) 0-3 each, N Scully 0-2 (0- 1' 45') C McKiernan, A O’Brien (0-1f), M Hiney, E O’Gara, Cillian O’Gara, G Vickery 0-1 each.	Report	T Mac Gearailt 0-4 (0-1f), E Murray 1-0 (1-0 pen), C Walsh 0-1.	Kiltipper Road; Referee: D O’Donovan (St Mark’s).

First Round	St. Vincent's	3-13 - 1-08	St. Pat's, Palmerstown	Parnell Park; Referee: S Gahan (Erin’s Isle).
First Round	T Quinn (0-1 ’45’), S Carthy, D Connolly 1-1 each, A Martin 0-4, C Dorney, G Burke, C Diamond, A Baxter, M Loftus, M Concarr 0-1 each.	Report	C Driver 1-6 (0-4f), G Kelly, J Kelly 0-1 each.	Parnell Park; Referee: S Gahan (Erin’s Isle).

First Round	Ballymun Kickhams	1-18 - 1-06	Naomh Olaf	Parnell Park; Referee: T McCarthy (St Vincent’s)
First Round	Derek Byrne 0-6 (0-4f), P McMahon 1-2, J Whelan, F Andrews (0-1f), D Rock (1f, ‘45’) 0-2 each, K Connolly, L O’Donovan, K Leahy, M Brady 0-1 each.	Report	J Burke 1-0 (own goal), E Kinsella (1f), S Whyte 0-2, M Doyle, Daragh Byrne (f) 0-1 each.	Parnell Park; Referee: T McCarthy (St Vincent’s)

First Round	St. Brigid's	0-16 - 0-11	Clontarf	Parnell Park; Referee: B Tiernan (O’Dwyer’s)
First Round	P Ryan 0-5 (0-2f), P Andrews, L McCarthy (0-3f, 0-1 ‘45’) 0-4, M Cahill 0-2, C Mullins 0-1.	Report	C Johnson 0-6 (0-4f, 0-1 ‘45’), P Mohan, M MacDonncha (0-2f) 0-2, K McGrath 0-1.	Parnell Park; Referee: B Tiernan (O’Dwyer’s)

First Round	St. Jude's	2-14 - 1-05	Naomh Mearnóg	Parnell Park; Referee: D Feeney (Parnells)
First Round	K McManamon 1-5, DA Donnelly 1-1 (1-0 pen), J Donnelly (0-1f), C Guckian 0-2, R Joyce, P Courtney, M Sweeney, D McLoughlin 0-1 each.	Report	J Walsh 1-1 (0-1f), N Murphy (0-f), M Gibbs, A Fee, S Kenny 0-1 each.	Parnell Park; Referee: D Feeney (Parnells)

First Round	Na Fianna	3-20 - 0-08	Cuala	O'Toole Park; Referee: P Faughnan (St Patrick’s Palmerstown).
First Round	A Caffrey 0-5, J Caffrey (0-1f), E Neville 1-2 each, P Quinn, C McHugh 0-3 each, D Quinn 1-0, D McGrath 0-2, N Cooper, J Cooper, E Connolly.	Report	M Clancy 0-3, R Scollard (0-1f), C Sheanon (f), E Breathnach, M Fitzsimons, S O’Brien 0-1 each.	O'Toole Park; Referee: P Faughnan (St Patrick’s Palmerstown).

First Round	St. Anne's	1-14 - 1-10	Thomas Davis	O'Toole Park; Referee: S McCarthy (St Vincent’s).
First Round	C McKeown 0-4 (0-4f), D Watson 1-1, E Kennedy 0-3 (0-1f), D Wright (0-2f), L O’Brien 0-2 each, S Fulham, D Fulham 0-1 each.	Report	P Hudson 0-5 (0-3f), S McGrath 0-3, C Galvin 1-0, C Farrelly (0-1), E Kirby 0-1 each.	O'Toole Park; Referee: S McCarthy (St Vincent’s).

== Round 2 ==
St. Sylvester's, Fingal Ravens, Ballinteer St. John's, Ballyboden St. Enda's, St. Oliver Plunkett's Eoghan Ruadh, Raheny, Skerries Harps, Lucan Sarsfields, Templeogue Synge Street, St. Vincent's, Ballymun Kickhams and Whitehall Colmcille qualified for the second round of the Dublin football Championship.

Second Round	St. Vincent's	3-12 - 1-09	St. Sylvester's	Parnell Park; Referee: J King (Garda).
Second Round	R Trainor 1-3, S Carty, D Connolly 1-1 each, T Quinn 0-3 (0-2f), G Burke, C Dorney, E Fennell, C Diamond 0-1 each.	Report	A Foy 1-0; M McCarthy 0-3 (0-2f), R Hazley 0-2, G Sweeney, D McDonnell (0-1f), G McArdle,	Parnell Park; Referee: J King (Garda).

Second Round	St. Jude's	1-13 - 0-06	Whitehall Colmcille	Parnell Park; Referee: P Behan (Trinity Gaels).
Second Round	D Donnelly 1-5 (0-2f, 0-1 ‘45’), B McManamon 0-5 (0-4f), J Donnelly, T Lahiff, M Sweeney 0-1 each.	Report	C Costello 0-4 (0-3f), E O’Donnell; P Corry 0-1 each.	Parnell Park; Referee: P Behan (Trinity Gaels).

Second Round	Lucan Sarsfields	2-12 - 0-12	Raheny	Attendance: D Sheppard (Round Tower, Lusk).
Second Round	B Gallagher 1-5 (0-1f), E O Conghaile 1-3 (0-1f), J McCormack 0-2, A Hope, D Gallagher 0-1 each.	Report	D Ryan 0-8 (0-6f), B Fenton 0-2, E Keogh, G Ivory (0-1 ’45’) 0-1 each.	Attendance: D Sheppard (Round Tower, Lusk).

Second Round	Templeogue Synge Street	2-09 - 0-14	Na Fianna	Parnell Park; Referee: D Ashton (Nh Mearnog).
Second Round	E O'Gara 1-4, D Bastick 1-1 (1-0 pen), T Coyle, C O'Gara, G Vickery, DTreanor 0-1 each.	Report	A Caffrey 0-5 (0-3f), C McHugh 0-4, E Neville, J Caffrey (0-1f) 0-2 each, D Quinn 0-1.	Parnell Park; Referee: D Ashton (Nh Mearnog).

Second Round	St. Oliver Plunketts Eoghan Ruadh	1-12 - 0-09	St. Anne's	Parnell Park; Referee: G McCormack (Naomh Barróg).
Second Round	B Brogan 1-3 (0-1f), A Brogan, G Smith (0-1f, 0-1 ‘45’) 0-2 each, D Lally, N Walsh, C Dunleavy, P McNulty, D Matthews 0-1 each.	Report	C McKeown, S Fulham 0-2 each, D Galvin, E Kennedy, N Bergin, D Watson, P McGrath 0-1 each.	Parnell Park; Referee: G McCormack (Naomh Barróg).

Second Round	Ballymun Kickhams	3-17 - 0-05	Fingal Ravens	Parnell Park; Referee: P Fitzsimons (Liffey Gaels).
Second Round	D Rock 1-5 (1-0pen, 0-2f, 0-2 ‘45’), T Furman 1-4, D Givney 1-1, J Whelan 0-3, K Leahy 0-2, A Hubbard, F Andrews 0-1 each.	Report	A Casey 0-3, N Tormey, C Norton 0-1 each.	Parnell Park; Referee: P Fitzsimons (Liffey Gaels).

Second Round	Ballyboden St. Enda's	3-15 - 0-08	Ballinteer St. John's	O'Toole Park; Referee: B Tiernan (O’Dwyer’s).
Second Round	R Basquel 2-2; C Keaney1-2; A Kerin0-4 (0-2f); B Dwan 0-2; D Nelson, D O’Mahoney, S Molony, SnGibbons, A Flood 0-1 each.	Report	B Colleran 0-4 (0-3f); A Clabby 0-2 (0-1f); F Duffy (0-1f), L Naughton 0-1 each.	O'Toole Park; Referee: B Tiernan (O’Dwyer’s).

Second Round	St. Brigids	0-15 - 0-13	Skerries Harps	Chanel; Referee: R Malone (St Mary’s, Saggart).
Second Round	P Ryan 0-4 (0-2f), M Cahill 0-3, E Mulligan (0-2f), L McCarthy (0-1f), P Andrews 0-2 each, K Bonner, C Lynch 0-1 each.	Report	H Dawson 0-8 (0-6f), D Reilly 0-2, J Smith, B Cullen (0-1 '45'), P Cashman 0-1 each.	Chanel; Referee: R Malone (St Mary’s, Saggart).

== Quarter finals ==
The quarter final draw was announced on 20 September 2014 at Parnell Park.

4 October 2014; 3.30pm Quarter-Final	St. Oliver Plunketts/Eoghan Ruadh	2-12 - 0-10	Ballymun Kickhams	Parnell Park; Referee: G McCormack (Naomh Barróg).
4 October 2014; 3.30pm Quarter-Final	G Smith 0-5 (0-3f), B Brogan 0-4, J Brogan, A Brogan 1-0, C Dunleavy 0-2, N Walsh 0-1.	Report	D Rock 0-6 (0-5f), J Burke 0-2, S George, J Small 0-1 each.	Parnell Park; Referee: G McCormack (Naomh Barróg).

4 October 2014; 5.00pm Quarter-Final	Templeogue Synge Street	3-9 - 3-20	St. Vincent's	Parnell Park; Referee: D Sheppard (Round Towers, Lusk).
4 October 2014; 5.00pm Quarter-Final	E O’Gara 1-1, G Vickery, J Swaine 1-0 each, N Scully 0-3, T Coyle, D Treanor (1f) 0-2 each, M Treanor 0-1.	Report	T Quinn 3-4 (0-3f), R Trainor 0-4, D Connolly, C Dorney 0-3 each, G Burke, S Carthy 0-2 each, E Fennell, T Diamond 0-1 each.	Parnell Park; Referee: D Sheppard (Round Towers, Lusk).

5 October 2014; 2.30pm Quarter Final	St. Jude's	3-11 - 0-12	St. Brigid's	O'Toole Park; Referee: S Gahan (Erin’s Isle).
5 October 2014; 2.30pm Quarter Final	K McManamon 3-5 (0-1f), C Murphy, P Maguire, B McManamon, J Donnelly, R Joyce, T Lahiff 0-1 each.	Report	E Mulligan 0-8 (0-5f), D Plunkett, C Mullins, L McCarthy, K Bonner 0-1 each.	O'Toole Park; Referee: S Gahan (Erin’s Isle).

5 October 2014; 4.00pm Quarter Final	Ballyboden St. Enda's	0-14 - 0-09	Lucan Sarsfields	O'Toole Park; Referee: J King (Garda)
5 October 2014; 4.00pm Quarter Final	A Kerin 0-6 (0-2f), S Molony 0-3, D O’Mahony, R Basquel (0-1f) 0-2 each, C Keaney 0-1.	Report	B Gallagher (0-3f), E O Conghaile 0-3 each, S O’Shaughnessy, S Newcombe, D Gallagher 0-1 each.	O'Toole Park; Referee: J King (Garda)

== Semi finals ==
18 October 2014; 15:30; Semi-Final	St. Oliver Plunketts/Eoghan Ruadh	1-11 - 0-04	St. Jude's	Parnell Park; Referee: M Bissett (Whitehall Colmcille)
18 October 2014; 15:30; Semi-Final	B Brogan 1-2 (0-1f), G Smith 0-4 (0-1f, 0-1 ‘45’), N Walsh 0-2, J Brogan, C Walsh, C Dunleavy 0-1 each.	Report	D Donnelly, J Donnelly, R Finnegan, R Joyce 0-1 each.	Parnell Park; Referee: M Bissett (Whitehall Colmcille)

18 October 2014; 17:15; Semi-Final	Ballyboden St. Enda's	1-10 - 1-17	St. Vincent's	Parnell Park; Referee: D Feeney (Parnells)
18 October 2014; 17:15; Semi-Final	C Keaney 1-1, A Kerin (3f), S Molony 0-3 each, D Davey 0-2, D O’Mahoney 0-1.	Report	D Connolly 1-6, T Quinn 0-4 (3f), E Fennell, S Carthy 0-2 each, R Trainor, M Loftus, Cormac Diamond 0-1 each.	Parnell Park; Referee: D Feeney (Parnells)

== Final ==
St. Vincents retain the Dublin Championship and go on to the Leinster Senior Club Football Championship.

27 October 2014; 19:45; Final	St. Vincent's	0-14 - 1-10	St. Oliver Plunketts/Eoghan Ruadh	Parnell Park
27 October 2014; 19:45; Final	Ciaran Dorney, Gavin Burke 0-3 each, Shane Carthy, Ruairi Trainor 0-2 each, Diarmuid Connolly, Eamon Fennell, Tomas Quinn (0-1f), Cameron Diamond 0-1 each.	Report	Bernard Brogan 0-5 (0-3f), Alan Brogan 1-1, Gareth Smith 0-3 (0-1 ’45), Paraic Lee 0-1.	Parnell Park
