= 2001 Dublin Senior Football Championship =

Tournament details
- County: Dublin
- Year: 2001

Winners
- Champions: Na Fianna (5th win)

The 2001 Dublin senior football championship was won by Na Fianna. Na Fianna managed to retain the title having won it in 2000 by beating St. Brigid's at Parnell Park.
