= 1894 All-Ireland Senior Football Championship final =

- Event: 1894 All-Ireland Senior Football Championship
Dublin	Cork
1–1	0–6
- Date: 24 March 1895
- Venue: Clonturk Park, Dublin
- Referee: R. T. Blake (Meath)

1894 All-Ireland Senior Football Championship final replay
Dublin	Cork
0–5	1–2
- Date: 21 April 1895
- City: Thurles
- Referee: R. T. Blake (Meath)
- Attendance: 10,000

The 1894 All-Ireland Senior Football Championship final was the seventh All-Ireland Final and the deciding match of the 1894 All-Ireland Senior Football Championship, an inter-county Gaelic football tournament for the top teams in Ireland.

== Matches ==
=== Summary ===
The first game was a draw, 0–6 to 1–1 (at the time, a goal equalled five points) and so a replay was played. With ten minutes remaining, and Cork leading by 1–2 to 0–5 (seven points to five), several Dublin players were attacked by Cork supporters. Dublin refused to play on and the Gaelic Athletic Association (GAA) Central Council awarded them the championship.

The Cork County Board never accepted this finding and four months later a ceremony was held to award gold medals to the victorious Nil Desperandum players (in those days each county was represented by the previous years' county champions). At the ceremony the Lord Mayor of Cork said that he "was positively certain that the Dublin Gaels always recognised the merits of the Nils, and now hailed them as winners of the Football Championship for '94."

However, the final went into the record books as Dublin's third All-Ireland SFC title of the 1890s; they won three more that decade.

=== Details ===
==== Dublin (is this the replay or the drawn game?) ====
- John Kennedy (c)
- George Charlemont
- Dick Curtis
- George Roche
- Pat Heslin
- T. Lyons
- J. Geraghty
- Luke O'Kelly
- P. Kelly
- T. Hughes
- T. Mahony
- Myles Condon
- M. Byrne
- Tommy Errity
- P. O'Toole
- Jack Kirwan
- Frank O'Malley

==== Cork (is this the replay or the drawn game?) ====
- John O'Leary (c)
- Murty Downey
- Billy Riordan
- Dick Coughlan
- P. J. Walsh
- W. Burgess
- Dan O'Coughlan
- Tom Irwin
- Frankie Joyce
- Dave Kelleher
- T. Houlihan
- Tim Lucey
- Dan Coughlan
- J. O'Riordan
- Mick McCarthy
- James Mulcahy
- Michael Coleman

Subs
R. Mulcahy
P. Lane
