= 1892 All-Ireland Senior Football Championship final =

- Event: 1892 All-Ireland Senior Football Championship
Dublin	Kerry
1–4 (7)	0–3 (3)
- Date: 26 March 1893
- Venue: Clonturk Park, Dublin
- Referee: Dan Fraher (Waterford)
- Attendance: 5,000

The 1892 All-Ireland Senior Football Championship final was the fifth All-Ireland Final and the deciding match of the 1892 All-Ireland Senior Football Championship, an inter-county Gaelic football tournament for the top teams in Ireland.

== Match ==
=== Summary ===
At this time, the club champions of each county represented their county in the All-Ireland championships. Dublin were represented by the Young Irelanders club while Kerry were represented by Laune Rangers.

The sides were level 0–3 apiece at half-time.

Dublin won, scoring the all-important goal with ten minutes to go.

It was the second of six All-Ireland SFC titles won by Dublin in the 1890s.

It was the first meeting of Dublin and Kerry. The rivalry between the sides would grow into something massive in the years and decades ahead.

=== Details ===
26 March 1893

Dublin	1–4 – 0–3	Kerry

Clonturk Park, Drumcondra
Attendance: 5,000
Referee: Dan Fraher (Waterford)

Dublin
Kerry

==== Dublin ====
- John Kennedy (c)
- George Charlemont
- George Roche
- Jim Roche
- J. Geraghty
- R. Flood
- S. Flood
- S. Hughes
- Frank O'Malley
- Tom Doran
- Luke O'Kelly
- P. Kelly
- Pat Heslin
- M. Byrne
- J. Silke
- Tommy Errity
- Dick Curtis

=== Post-match ===
With their 1940 win, Kerry would reach 14 All-Ireland SFC titles, drawing level with Dublin. Dublin had been in the lead since 1892. In 1941, Kerry would take the lead; Dublin equalled the new total in 1942, but never again managed to surpass Kerry's total.
