= Cork–Dublin Gaelic football rivalry =

Cork-Dublin
- Location: County Cork; County Dublin
- Teams: Cork; Dublin
- First meeting: Dublin 2-1 - 1-9 Cork; 1891 All-Ireland final (28 February 1892)
- Latest meeting: Dublin 1-19 - 1-16 Cork; 2025 All-Ireland preliminary quarter-final (21 June 2025)

Statistics
- Total meetings: 18
- Most wins: Dublin (14)
- Top scorer: Barney Rock (2-12)
- All-time series: Dublin 14-2-2 Cork
- Largest victory: Dublin 5-18 - 1-17 Cork; 2019 All-Ireland quarter-final group stage (13 July 2019)

The Cork-Dublin rivalry is a Gaelic football rivalry between Irish county teams Cork and Dublin, who first played each other in 1891. It is considered to be one of the biggest rivalries in Gaelic games. Cork's home ground is Páirc Uí Chaoimh and Dublin's home ground is Parnell Park, however, all of their championship meetings have been held at neutral venues, usually Croke Park.

While Cork have the second highest number of Munster titles and Dublin are the standard bearers in Leinster, they have also enjoyed success in the All-Ireland Senior Football Championship, having won 35 championship titles between them to date.

== Statistics ==
Team	All-Ireland	Provincial	National League	Total
Cork	7	37	8	52
Dublin	28	58	13	99
Combined	35	95	21	151

== History ==
=== 1974: a first semi-final meeting ===
For the first time in over 66 years, Cork and Dublin clashed in the championship on 11 August 1974. It was their first ever championship meeting at the semi-final stage of the All-Ireland series and the only 80-minute clash between the sides. Cork misread the semi-final, assuming that Dublin's first win in Leinster since 1965 was down to a drop in standards in the province, rather than a marked improvement by Kevin Heffernan's newly charged outfit. Cork led for only 90 seconds of the game, by a point between the 50th second of the game and the end of the second minute. Dublin kicked eight wides during the opening 40 minutes compared to Cork's five, however, they still held a 0-7 to 0-4 interval lead. John McCarthy put them four clear in the 44th minute and, three minutes later, Anton O'Toole scored the first goal of the game. Cork regrouped and a goal from a penalty by Jimmy Barry-Murphy brought them back into the game. In the 68th minute Cork goalkeeper Billy Morgan dragged down a goal-bound Jimmy Keaveney and another penalty awarded. Brian Mullins converted the goal which ultimately sealed Dublin's 2-11 to 1-8 victory.

=== 2010-2013: 21st century rivalry ===
For the first time in fifteen years, Cork and Dublin clashed in the All-Ireland semi-final on 22 August 2010. Barely a minute had elapsed when Niall Corkery’s searching delivery found Bernard Brogan lurking behind Ray Carey, and he beat Alan Quirke with a low shot, planted in the corner of the net. Cork had points from Donncha O'Connor and Daniel Goulding, but had a series of bad wides. The Brogan brothers stretched the Dubs’ lead to five on 18 minutes, and Cork’s defending was at times haphazard. Dublin led by 1-8 to 0-7 at the break, and Cork’s difficulties intensified when injured captain Graham Canty was unable to return for the second half. Ross McConnell powered over Dublin’s first score of the second half in the 42nd minute. Their defence was superb, closing out their opponents, who managed just one point, through Goulding, in the opening 15 minutes of the second half. Bernard Brogan stretched Dublin's advantage to five, but the lead was cut back to a point in the 54th minute when Donncha O'Connor slotted a penalty in off the post. Dublin quickly restored their three points advantage, but Paul Kerrigan, Colm O'Neill and Patrick Kelly landed points to level the game. Cork continued to chip away at the lead, with O’Connor securing the lead for the first time in the 70th minute. Derek Kavanagh nailed on a point, and while Bernard Brogan brought his total to 1-7, the Dubs fell just short.

On 3 August 2013, Cork and Dublin clashed for the first time in an All-Ireland quarter-final. Cork settled quickest with Daniel Goulding firing the opening point after two minutes. Dublin goalkeeper Stephen Cluxton impressed from placed balls, firing Dublin 0-4 to 0-2 ahead, but Cork bounced back to tie the game at 0-4 apiece after 12 minutes, with Brian Hurley and John O'Rourke on target. Dublin regained the lead thanks to Paul Flynn. Cork pushed ahead once again, however, Dublin finished the half strongly, outscoring the Rebels by three points to one before the interval, with Flynn, Ciarán Kilkenny and Bernard Brogan on target as they claimed a 0-9 to 0-7 half-time lead. Most of these goal opportunities came in the closing 35 minutes, with Jack McCaffrey the only man to place the ball in the back of the net, three minutes after the restart to push Dublin four points clear. Ciarán Sheehan was denied of a Cork goal in the 40th minute, after Rory O'Carroll made a superb block. Cork continued to plug away and cut the gap to two points in the 49th minute. But the Leesiders couldn't get any closer despite their efforts in the final quarter, with Dean Rock, Kevin McManamon, Kilkenny, Cluxton and Denis Bastick on target.

== All-time results ==
=== Legend ===
Cork win
Dublin win
Match was a draw

=== Senior ===
No.	Date	Winners	Score	Runners-up	Venue	Stage
1.	28 February 1892	Dublin	2-1 - 1-9	Cork	Clonturk Park	All-Ireland final
2.	24 March 1895	Dublin	0-6 - 1-1	Cork	Clonturk Park	All-Ireland final
3.	21 April 1895	Dublin	0-5 - 1-2	Cork	Thurles Sportsfield	All-Ireland final replay
4.	5 February 1899	Dublin	2-6 - 0-2	Cork	Jones's Road	All-Ireland final
5.	10 February 1901	Dublin	1-10 - 0-6	Cork	Jones's Road	All-Ireland final
6.	5 July 1903	Dublin	1-2 - 0-4	Cork	Tipperary Sportsfield	All-Ireland home final
7.	20 October 1907	Dublin	0-5 - 0-4	Cork	Geraldine Park	All-Ireland final
8.	5 July 1908	Dublin	0-6 - 0-2	Cork	Tipperary Sportsfield	All-Ireland final
9.	11 August 1974	Dublin	2-11 - 1-8	Cork	Croke Park	All-Ireland semi-final
10.	21 August 1983	Dublin	2-11 - 2-11	Cork	Croke Park	All-Ireland semi-final
11.	28 August 1983	Dublin	4-15 - 2-10	Cork	Páirc Uí Chaoimh	All-Ireland semi-final replay
12.	20 August 1989	Cork	2-10 - 1-9	Dublin	Croke Park	All-Ireland semi-final
13.	20 August 1995	Dublin	1-12 - 0-12	Cork	Croke Park	All-Ireland semi-final
14.	22 August 2010	Cork	1-15 - 1-14	Dublin	Croke Park	All-Ireland semi-final
15.	3 August 2013	Dublin	1-16 - 0-14	Cork	Croke Park	All-Ireland quarter-final
16.	13 July 2019	Dublin	5-18 - 1-17	Cork	Croke Park	All-Ireland quarter-final group stage
17.	25 June 2022	Dublin	0-21 - 0-10	Cork	Croke Park	All-Ireland quarter-final
18.	21 June 2025	Dublin	1-19 - 1-16	Cork	Croke Park	All-Ireland Preliminary Quarter Final

=== Junior ===
No.	Date	Winners	Score	Runners-up	Venue	Stage
1.	28 August 1955	Cork	2-5 - 0-6	Dublin	Cork Athletic Grounds	All-Ireland semi-final
2.	24 October 1971	Dublin	1-14 - 2-5	Cork	Clonmel GAA Ground	All-Ireland home final
3.	25 July 1987	Cork	2-7 - 0-8	Dublin	Semple Stadium	All-Ireland semi-final

=== Under-21/Under-20 ===
No.	Date	Winners	Score	Runners-up	Venue	Stage
1.	12 October 1990	Cork	2-8 - 1-5	Dublin	MacDonagh Park	All-Ireland semi-final
2.	19 April 2009	Cork	1-10 - 1-9	Dublin	Semple Stadium	All-Ireland semi-final
3.	21 April 2012	Dublin	3-11 - 0-14	Cork	O'Moore Park	All-Ireland semi-final
4.	3 August 2019	Cork	3-16 - 1-14	Dublin	O'Moore Park	All-Ireland final

=== Minor ===
No.	Date	Winners	Score	Runners-up	Venue	Stage
1.	17 August 1959	Dublin	1-12 - 1-8	Cork	Croke Park	All-Ireland semi-final
2.	4 August 1968	Cork	2-10 - 1-6	Dublin	Croke Park	All-Ireland semi-final
3.	22 August 1971	Cork	2-13 - 1-10	Dublin	Croke Park	All-Ireland semi-final
4.	24 August 1986	Cork	2-7 - 0-8	Dublin	Croke Park	All-Ireland semi-final
5.	31 August 2003	Dublin	1-18 - 1-9	Cork	Croke Park	All-Ireland semi-final
6.	1 August 2011	Dublin	1-11 - 1-3	Cork	O'Moore Park	All-Ireland quarter-final
7.	4 August 2013	Dublin	2-14 - 1-13	Cork	Croke Park	All-Ireland quarter-final

== Records ==
=== Top scorers ===
Team	Player	Score	Total
Cork	John Cleary	2-10	16
Dublin	Barney Rock	2-12	18

== Club level ==
=== Legend ===
Cork win
Dublin win
Match was a draw

=== Senior ===
No.	Date	Winners	Score	Runners-up	Venue	Stage
1.	4 June 1973	Nemo Rangers	2-11 - 2-11	St. Vincent's	O'Moore Park	All-Ireland final
2.	24 June 1973	Nemo Rangers	4-6 - 0-10	St. Vincent's	O'Moore Park	All-Ireland final replay
3.	16 March 1975	University College Dublin	1-11 - 0-12	Nemo Rangers	Croke Park	All-Ireland final
4.	22 February 1976	St. Vincent's	0-10 - 0-3	Nemo Rangers	Croke Park	All-Ireland semi-final
5.	19 February 1989	Nemo Rangers	1-4 - 0-5	Parnells	Páirc Liam Mhic Cárthaigh	All-Ireland semi-final
6.	26 February 1995	Kilmacud Crokes	1-11 - 1-7	Castlehaven	Semple Stadium	All-Ireland semi-final
7.	22 February 1998	Erin's Isle	2-12 - 0-17	Castlehaven	Semple Stadium	All-Ireland semi-final
8.	17 March 2008	St. Vincent's	1-11 - 0-13	Nemo Rangers	Croke Park	All-Ireland final
