= 1896 All-Ireland Senior Football Championship final =

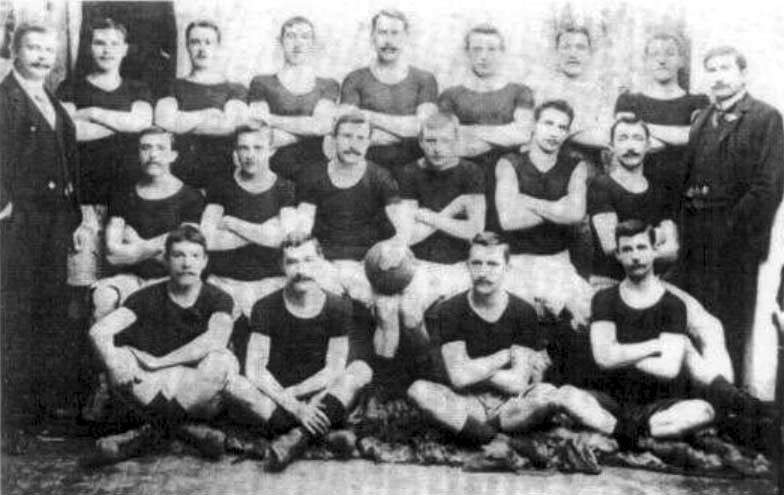
- Limerick, champions
- Event: 1896 All-Ireland Senior Football Championship
Limerick	Dublin
1–5 (8)	0–7 (7)
- Date: 6 February 1898
- Venue: Jones' Road, Dublin
- Referee: Thomas Dooley (Cork)
- Attendance: 3,500
- Weather: dry, cold, windy

The 1896 All-Ireland Senior Football Championship Final, the ninth in the competition's history, took place at Jones Road, Dublin, on 6 February 1898, with Cork official Thomas Dooley as referee. Munster champions Limerick defeated Leinster champions Dublin by 1-5 to 0-7, securing a 3-point win. This was Limerick’s second and final appearance in an All-Ireland Football Final.

== Match ==
=== Summary ===
The Commercials club represented Limerick, while Young Irelands represented Dublin.

The Limerick team, having won the toss, chose to defend the railway goal, gaining the advantage of a diagonal but strong wind. At the throw-in, Dublin immediately rushed forward and scored a point within ten seconds. Limerick quickly countered, driving the ball toward the Dublin goal, but Roche saved splendidly. Despite Limerick’s early pressure, Dublin transferred the play and scored their second point after a brief delay due to an injury to a Young Irelands player.

Shortly after resuming, Limerick pressed hard, quickly earning a goal from William Murphy, levelling the score at 1-4 to 0-7 after 16 minutes. Limerick then added another point three minutes later and continued pressing, scoring another soon after, with Fitzgerald excelling. By half-time, Limerick led 1-4 to 0-3.

The second half started with Limerick scoring a low point within a minute. Dublin responded with sustained pressure, but despite their efforts, many shots went wide. Dublin edged closer, scoring two more points to trail by just one. Limerick, however, managed to hold off Dublin’s advances, and the final whistle blew with Limerick victorious, 1-5 (8 points) to 0-7 (7 points).

=== Details ===
==== Limerick ====
- Con Fitzgerald (c)
- D. Birrane
- Bill Guiry
- James O'Riordan
- L. Roche
- John O'Riordan
- Larry Sheehan
- P. Roche
- Ailbe Quillinan
- J. Buttimer
- Tom Campion
- James Dalton
- Bill Murphy
- W. McNamara
- John Murphy
- James Nash
- M. Ryan

Sub used
J. Griffin

==== Dublin ====
- George Roche (c)
- J. Kirwan
- Luke O'Kelly
- W. Conlon
- J. Teeling
- T. Hession
- J. Gannon
- Dick Curtis
- S. Mooney
- R. Graham
- P. O'Toole
- J. Brady
- Tom Doran
- Tommy Errity
- Pat Heslin
- M. Byrne
- Joseph Ledwidge
