= Kerry county football team =

Gaelic football team

Kerry
- Sport: Gaelic football
- Irish: Ciarraí
- Nickname(s): The Kingdom; The Green and Gold
- County board: Kerry GAA
- Manager: Jack O’Connor
- Captain: Gavin White
- Home venue(s): Austin Stack Park, Tralee; Fitzgerald Stadium, Killarney

Recent competitive record
- Current All-Ireland status: Runners-up in 2026
- Last championship title: 2025
- Current NFL Division: 1 (2nd in 2026)
- Last league title: 2025
First colours	Second colours

The Kerry county football team represents Kerry in men's Gaelic football and is governed by Kerry GAA, a county board of the Gaelic Athletic Association. The team competes in the three major annual inter-county competitions: the All-Ireland Senior Football Championship, the Munster Senior Football Championship and the National Football League. They are the most successful county in Gaelic football history, having won the record most titles in each of these competitions: 39 All-Irelands, 24 National Football Leagues, and 86 Munster titles.

Kerry fast established itself as a major force after its maiden All-Ireland win in 1903, capturing at least two All-Irelands in each decade between the 1900s and 1980s. The Kerry team of the 1970s and 1980s, managed by Mick O'Dwyer, is considered to be one of the greatest in football history. O'Dwyer led the Kingdom to 8 All-Ireland titles between 1975 and 1989, the highest such tally for a single manager. He is widely regarded as one of the sport's greatest ever managers. O'Dwyer's departure brought a period of decline in the 1990s, but Kerry football has rebounded significantly in the 21st century. The team's current manager, Jack O'Connor, has won five All-Ireland SFC titles over three separate spells since 2000.

Kerry has played in green shirts with gold hoops and white shorts for most of its history. Its long-standing and fierce rivalry with Dublin emerged from periods of intense competition during the 1970s and 1980s and is one of the sport's most renowned. Notably, the teams contested five consecutive All-Ireland finals between 1975 and 1979. Dublin's All-Ireland tally of 31 is outmatched only by Kerry's, and the sides are considered Gaelic football's "Big Two". Another important rivalry exists with Cork, their geographic neighbors in Munster and the second most successful Munster SFC side.

Kerry's home grounds are Austin Stack Park, Tralee and Fitzgerald Stadium, Killarney. Kerry was the fourth Munster county to win both the All-Ireland Senior Football Championship and All-Ireland Senior Hurling Championship, following Limerick, Tipperary and Cork. The team last won the Munster Senior Championship in 2026, the All-Ireland Senior Championship in 2025, and the National League in 2025.

== History ==
Kerry is the most successful team in Gaelic football history, having won the All-Ireland Senior Football Championship (SFC) on 39 occasions and the National Football League 21 times. The team also holds a number of distinctive records in football championship history. It has contested 59 All-Ireland SFC finals, the next highest participator being Dublin with 36 appearances. Kerry's record in the All-Ireland SFC involves having played 30 of the 31 other counties, with only Kilkenny being the exception.

[[

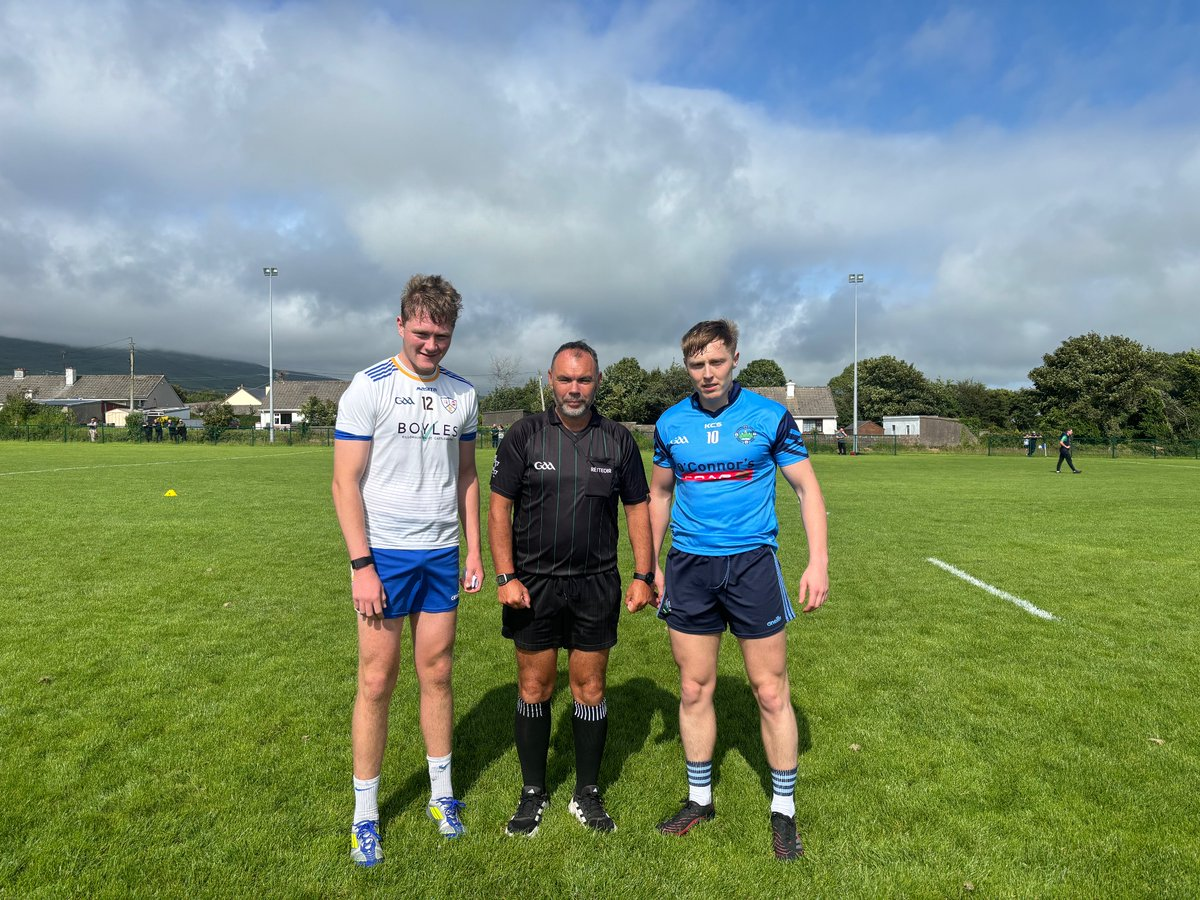
keel bounce

|thumb|left|Team of Kerry that won the 1924 Senior Championship]]

The traditional Irish game of caid, from which modern football developed, was especially popular in Kerry. The GAA was formed in 1884 and codified the modern rules of the game, which were soon adopted in Kerry clubs such as Laune Rangers. Despite this, the county team did not win an All-Ireland SFC in the nineteenth century. The 1903 title was the first won by Kerry, with the county defeating London in the final at a time when London was given a bye to that stage of the championship; Kerry's overall exceptional success in the game began in this period.

The Kerry team of the 1970s and 1980s was considered to be the greatest in the history of football and its manager (Mick O'Dwyer) one of the greatest of all time. Of the twenty All-Ireland SFC finals held during those two decades, Kerry participated in twelve, with victory coming on nine occasions. During this time most other finals were won by Dublin, and there was a major rivalry between the two counties, especially during the 1970s and 1980s. In 1982, Kerry came within one minute of winning an unprecedented fifth consecutive All-Ireland SFC title, only for a late goal by Offaly's Séamus Darby to give the title to Offaly. This goal was voted third in a poll to find the Top 20 GAA Moments.

Towards the end of the 1980s, Kerry went into decline and did not appear in an All-Ireland SFC final for eleven years, between 1986 and 1997. The 1997 victory, however, marked the beginning of a revival for Kerry which spanned roughly the first decade of the 21st century. Of the fifteen All-Ireland SFC finals between 1997 and 2011, Kerry contested ten and won six, including five titles in the 2000s.

Kerry reached the 2002 All-Ireland Senior Football Championship Final. Its opponent, Armagh, had lost its two previous appearances at this stage of the competition. Kerry led at half-time, but not at full-time, giving a first All-Ireland title to Armagh. Kerry later got rid of its manager Páidí Ó Sé, All-Ireland SFC winning manager in 1997 and 2000 and All-Ireland SFC winning player eight times between 1975 and 1986. Ó Sé fell ill and died some years later, at the age of 57.

Kerry reached the 2005 All-Ireland Senior Football Championship Final. Its opponent, Tyrone, had lost two of its three previous appearances at this stage. Tyrone did not lose this one.

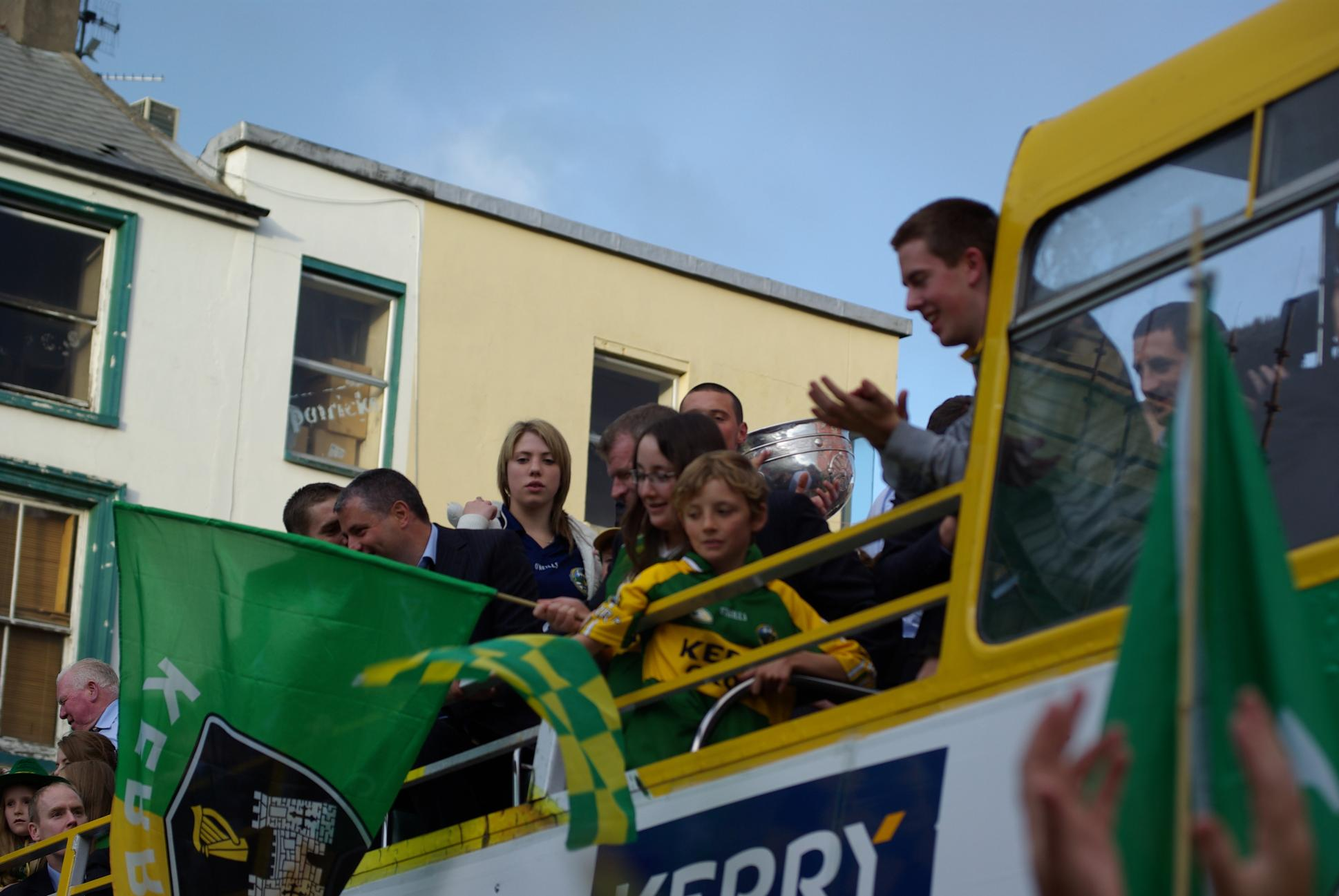
Kerry team celebrating with Sam Maguire Cup in Tralee in 2007

In 2006 and 2007, Kerry won consecutive All-Ireland SFC titles (the first team to do so since Cork in 1989 and 1990).

Kerry reached the 2008 All-Ireland Senior Football Championship Final. Its opponent, Tyrone, defeated it once more. By reaching the same stage in 2009, Kerry became only the third team to reach six consecutive All-Ireland SFC finals (a feat last achieved by Dublin between 1974 and 1979).

Kerry quietly exited the 2010 and 2012 All-Ireland SFCs at the quarter-final stage, losing to Down and Donegal respectively, while Dublin defeated Kerry in dramatic fashion on the last kick in the 2011 final. Dublin were also responsible for their exit at the semi-final stage in 2013 in a closely contested classic match. Kerry won its 37th All-Ireland SFC title in 2014 against Donegal, winning by a margin of 2–09 to 0–12. This win was notable due to Kerry's fairly young squad and a belief that Kerry were becoming unable to produce the talent they once had, after pundit Joe Brolly had suggested as such. In the aftermath of the game, Kerry player Kieran Donaghy gave a famous interview in which he directly referenced Brolly's claim that the 'production line' in Kerry had stopped, with Donaghy speaking directly to the camera and asking 'Well, Joe Brolly, what do you think of that?'. The next year, Kerry again reached the All-Ireland SFC final, only this time to be comfortably beaten by Dublin, 0–12 to 0–9. The next two years saw Kerry bow out at the semi-final stage. In 2016, the team was narrowly defeated by Dublin in a thrilling encounter, while in 2017 the team was beaten by Mayo in a replay – its first championship defeat to Mayo in 21 years. Kerry crashed out of the 2018 championships at the group stages of the new Super Eights format. However, in 2019 Kerry reached their first All-Ireland SFC final for four years. The first match was drawn on a scoreline of 1–16 to 1–16, with the replay fixed for 14 September.

Kerry's 2009 title was also notable since it followed the return of Tadhg Kennelly. The son of Tim Kennelly, a five-time All-Ireland winner with Kerry, and a former talented underage player with the county, he had joined the AFL's Sydney Swans and become the first Irish player to win an AFL Premiership in 2005 (the Swans' first in 72 years). Following Tim's death later that year, he elected to return to Ireland and rejoin Kerry in 2009 in pursuit of winning an All-Ireland of his own playing for the county. After he succeeded and became the first player to have won an All-Ireland and an AFL Premiership, he returned to Australia and the Swans to finish his career.

Kerry reached the 2011 All-Ireland Senior Football Championship Final, where its opponent was Dublin (appearing at this stage for the first time in 16 years). In what was a memorable ending to the game, Kerry conceded a free and Dublin goalkeeper Stephen Cluxton sent the ball over Kerry's bar to consign The Kingdom to defeat.

Kerry contested the 2019 All-Ireland Senior Football Championship Final, attempting to prevent Dublin from achieving five consecutive titles (the record Offaly denied Kerry in 1982). Kerry, however, failed to stop Dublin from achieving the record. Kerry had also been the team to set the record going, after losing the 2015 All-Ireland Senior Football Championship Final to Dublin as well.

Shortly after winning the 2020 National Football League, Kerry's footballers were knocked out of the 2020 All-Ireland Senior Football Championship after a defeat by Cork.

Kerry won its 38th All-Ireland SFC title in 2022 against Galway, winning by a margin of 0–20 to 0–16. It repeated the feat in 2025, defeating Donegal.

== Support ==
In January 2003, Páidí Ó Sé famously described Kerry supporters "fucking animals". More than 15 years later, former Tyrone footballer Seán Cavanagh, recalling his own experiences of the Kerry supporters, agreed that Ó Sé had been right. Cavanagh mentioned a 2012 match at Fitzgerald Stadium when an injury meant he could not play. "Then you sit in the stand, and you realise Páidí Ó Sé was right. They are absolute animals when the game is on". Cavanagh also questioned their "patronising" attitude towards their opponents. "It was strange that day. Their fans were riled on the terraces. They beat us well. They beat us out the gate, and you thought, 'Jesus, these guys are absolute dogs'. And then I remember as we were leaving the changing room, walking out onto the team bus there were hundreds of Kerry supporters, all clapping us. Either side of us, as we were walking through. They were back slapping us, 'ah youse are great lads', and all this. To me, it seemed a wee bit patronising".

Kerry has its own supporters' club, which Seán Kelly established in 1987. Another supporters' club exists in Dublin for those from the county who live in the capital city.

== Management team ==
Appointed 4 October 2021, some additions and subtractions noted:

- Bainisteóir: Jack O'Connor
- Roghnóirí: ~~Micheál Quirke~~ (until August 2024), ~~Diarmuid Murphy~~ (until 2024), James Costello (as of September 2024), Aodán Mac Gearailt (as of 2024), Cian O'Neill (as of September 2024)
- Later additions:
  - Head coach: ~~Paddy Tally~~ (as of 8 October 2021) Cian O'Neill (as of September 2024)
  - Assistant coach: Pa McCarthy (as of 2024)
  - Performance coach: ~~Tony Griffin~~ (until 2024)
  - Head of athletic development: Jason McGahan
  - Strength and conditioning coach: Arthur Fitzgerald
  - Sports science: John Barry
  - Statistics: Colin Trainor
  - Video: John C. O'Shea
  - Team doctors: Dr Mike Finnerty and John Rice
  - Physiotherapists: Jimmy Galvin and Paudie McQuinn
  - Masseurs: Harry O'Neill and Liam O'Regan
  - Goalkeeping coach: ~~Brendan Kealy~~ (until 2024), Brian Kelly (as of 2024)
  - Nutritionists: Kevin Beasley and Gavin Rackard (Rackard is also performance nutritionist for Connacht Rugby)
  - Equipment: Colm Whelan
  - Equipment/in-house referee: Brendan Griffin

== Panel ==
Team as per Kerry vs Tyrone in the 2025 All-Ireland Senior Football Championship Semi-Final, 12th July 2025

No.	Player	Position	Club
1	Shane Ryan	Goalkeeper	Rathmore
2	Paul Murphy	Right corner-back	Rathmore
3	Jason Foley	Full-back	Ballydonoghue
4	Dylan Casey	Left corner-back	Austin Stacks
5	Brian Ó Beaglaoich	Right half-back	An Ghaeltacht
6	Mike Breen	Centre-back	Beaufort
7	Gavin White (c)	Left half-back	Dr Crokes
8	Seán O'Brien	Midfield	Beaufort
9	Joe O'Connor	Midfield	Austin Stacks
10	Micheál Burns	Right half-forward	Dr Crokes
11	Seán O'Shea	Centre-forward	Kenmare Shamrocks
12	Graham O'Sullivan	Left half-forward	Dromid Pearses
13	David Clifford	Right corner-forward	Fossa
14	Conor Geaney	Full-forward	Dingle
15	Dylan Geaney	Left corner-forward	Dingle

No.	Player	Position	Club
16	Shane Murphy	Goalkeeper	Dr Crokes
17	Killian Spillane	Full-forward	Templenoe
18	Evan Looney	Wing-forward	Dr Crokes
19	Armin Heinrich	Centre-back	Austin Stacks
20	Tom Leo O'Sullivan	Corner-back	Dingle
21	Paudie Clifford	Centre-forward	Fossa
22	Mark O'Shea	Midfield	Dr Crokes
23	Tomás Kennedy	Wing-forward	Kerins O'Rahilly's
24	Tadhg Morley	Centre-back	Templenoe
25	Paul Geaney	Corner-forward	Dingle
26	Tony Brosnan	Corner-forward	Dr Crokes

^{INJ} Player has had an injury which has affected recent involvement with the county team.
^{RET} Player has since retired from the county team.
^{WD} Player has since withdrawn from the county team due to a non-injury issue.

== Managerial history ==
Kerry — like Cork, Dublin and Tyrone — traditionally appoints managers from inside, rather than seeking a "foreign" appointment.

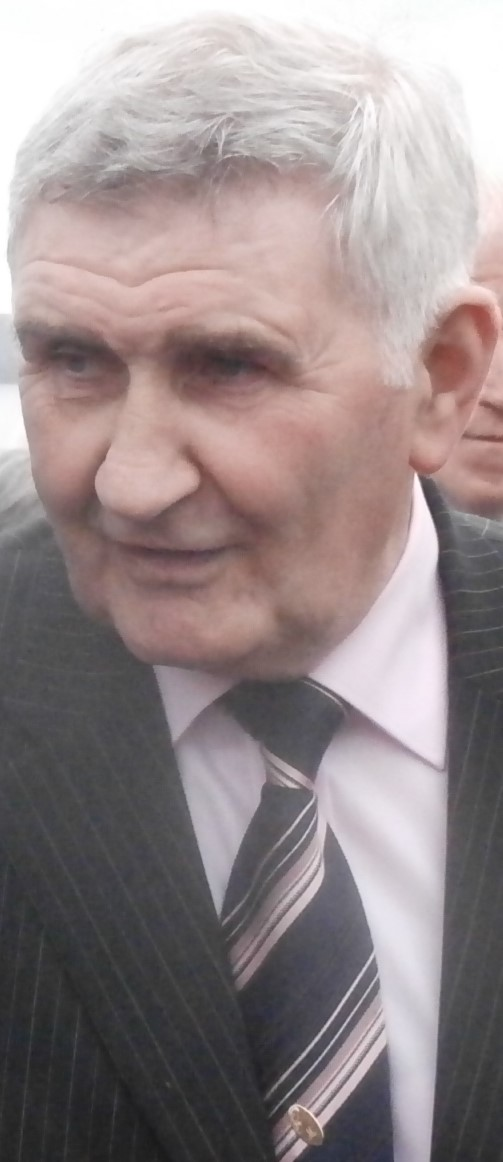
Mick O'Dwyer

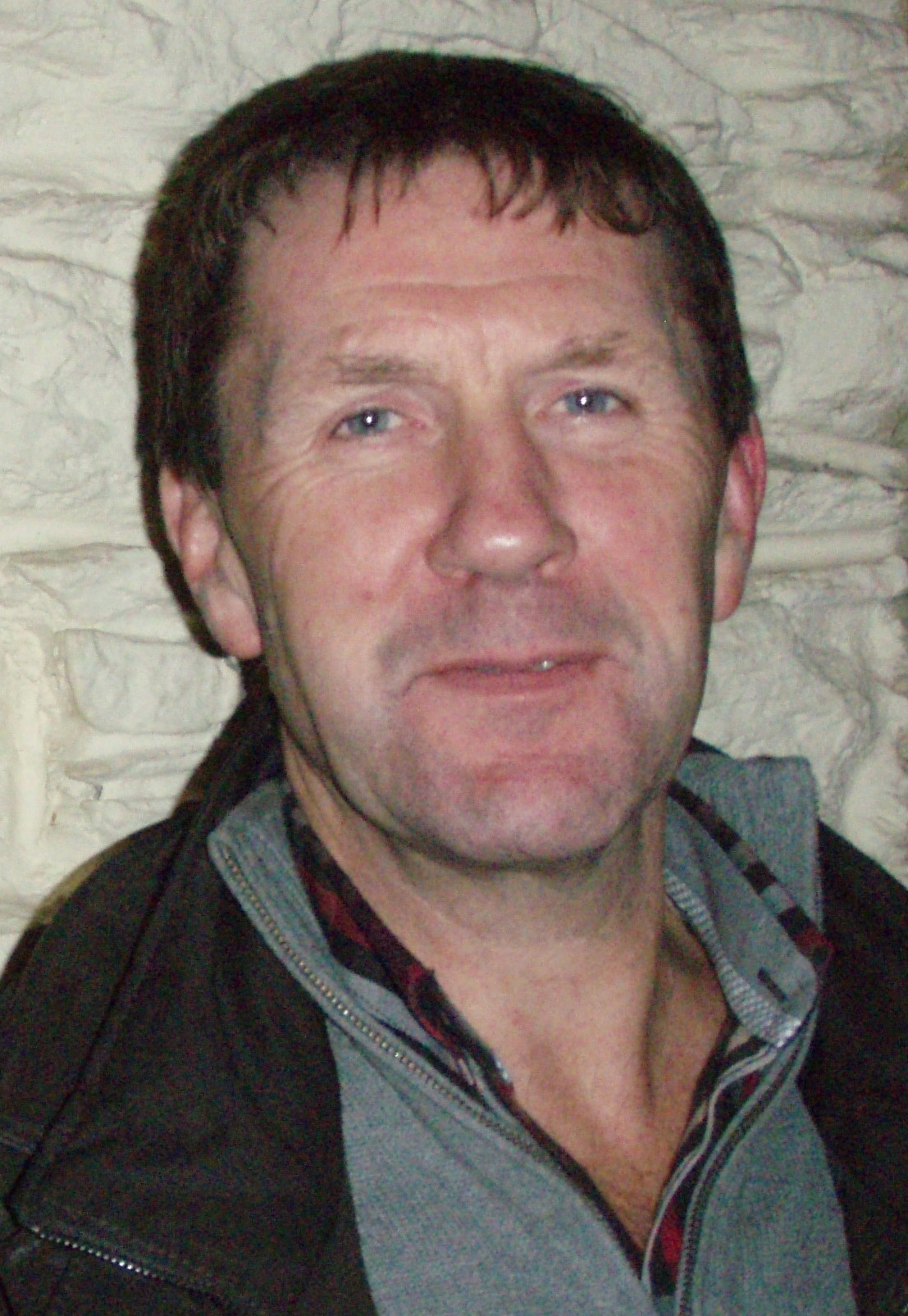
Jack O'Connor

O'Dwyer managed Kerry to eight All-Ireland SFC titles between 1975 and 1986, while current manager O'Connor has led Kerry to five All-Ireland SFC titles during three spells in charge.

Name	Club	From	To	All-Ireland SFC titles	Munster SFC titles
Dr Jim Brosnan	Dingle	1965	1968	—N/a	1965
Jackie Lyne	Killarney Legion	1968	1971	1969, 1970	1968, 1969, 1970
Joe Keohane	John Mitchels	1971	1972	—N/a	—N/a
Johnny Culloty	Killarney Legion	1972	1974	—N/a	1972
Mick O'Dwyer	Waterville	1975	1989	1975, 1978, 1979, 1980, 1981, 1984, 1985, 1986	1975, 1976, 1977, 1978, 1979, 1980, 1981, 1982, 1984, 1985, 1986
Mickey "Ned" O'Sullivan	Kenmare	1989	1992	—N/a	1991
Denis "Ogie" Moran	Beale	1992	1995	—N/a	—N/a
Páidí Ó Sé	An Ghaeltacht	1995	2003	1997, 2000	1996, 1997, 1998, 2000, 2001, 2003
Jack O'Connor	Piarsaigh Na Dromada	2004	2006	2004, 2006	2004, 2005
Pat O'Shea	Dr Crokes	2007	2008	2007	2007
Jack O'Connor (2)	Piarsaigh Na Dromada	2009	2012	2009	2010, 2011
Éamonn Fitzmaurice	Finuge	2013	2018	2014	2013, 2014, 2015, 2016, 2017, 2018
Peter Keane	St Mary's	2019	2021	—N/a	2019, 2021
Jack O'Connor (3)	Piarsaigh Na Dromada	2022	Present	2022, 2025	2022, 2023, 2024, 2025, 2026

== Players ==
=== Dynasties ===
Kerry has several noted families who have competed at the sport's highest level; these include the Ó Sés, the Sheehys, the Spillane–Lynes and the Walshes and Kennellys; Frank and John O'Keeffe; Jack and Aidan O'Shea; Ogie and David Moran; Con and Jim Brosnan; Ned and Maurice Fitzgerald; John Egan and his son.

=== Records ===
- Colm Cooper was the highest scoring player in the All-Ireland Senior Football Championship until 2019 when Cillian O'Connor of Mayo surpassed the record against Kerry during a defeat in Killarney. Cooper had taken the record from fellow Kerryman Mikey Sheehy.
- Mick O'Dwyer is the team's top scorer in National Football League history, finishing his career with 19–313 (370) in that competition. As of 2021, he remained in the top ten all-time scorers in that competition, though he had been passed by numerous players including Ronan Carolan of Cavan, Mattie Forde of Wexford, Steven McDonnell of Armagh, Conor McManus of Monaghan, Brian Stafford of Meath and David Tubridy of Clare.
- Beginning with Páidí, the Ó Sé family had at least one member play a part in all 22 All-Ireland SFC finals that Kerry participated in between 1975 and 2014.
- Pat Spillane received nine All Star Awards during his career, a feat matched by no other footballer.
- Tadhg Kennelly became the first (and thus far only) holder of both an AFL Premiership medallion and a Senior All-Ireland Championship medal, the highest respective possible honours in the sports of Australian rules football and Gaelic football, in addition to winning a GAA Medal as Irish Player of the Series in the International Rules Series. He was the third former AFL player to win the Sam Maguire Cup, following Dermot McNicholl in 1993 and Brian Stynes in 1995.

== Colours and crest ==
The team's current crest, which came into use in 2012, features design elements that represent the county: Kerry's people, landscape, flora, fauna and artistry.

Former Kerry crest (1988–2011)

County name – A bold decorative Celtic-style Ciarraí brand featuring a crowned C which pays homage to the county's moniker, 'The Kingdom'.

Kerry's people – St Brendan and his epic voyage: an inspiring tale of bravery, skill and innovation. The naomhóg (a craft associated with the coastal communities around Kerry) is propelled by a sail featuring a Celtic cross – the symbol of the GAA.

Kerry's fauna – Red Deer (Fia Rua): Ireland's largest wild animal whose only remaining native herd is found on the slopes of Torc and Mangerton. These animals are believed to have had a continuous presence in Ireland since the end of the last Ice Age (c. 10,000 BC) and are steeped in folklore. It is said that 'Tuan', the King of the Deer, was given rights of free passage by Fionn McCool to the mountains of Kerry and that his blood line lives on in the present herd.

Kerry's landscape – Skellig Michael's iconic silhouette rising out of the Atlantic Ocean. A designated UNESCO World Heritage site and famous around the globe.

Kerry's flora – Killarney woodland fern that thrives in wild exotic places; an evocation of majestic mountains, valleys and hills.

Kerry's artistry – A background pattern of concentric circles inspired by the gilding on the Ballinclemisig 'gold box' (part of the 'Kerry gold hoard' in the National Museum) and by Bronze Age stone carvings found all over Kerry.

Kerry's birdlife – Storm Petrel (An Guairdeall): Kerry plays host to the largest numbers of this species anywhere in the world and is the world headquarters for breeding pairs.

The new crest was introduced for copyright reasons, to secure the Kerry county board financially. The previous crest, shown on the right, which was used from 1988 to 2011, was based more on Irish and Celtic symbolism, featuring Rattoo Round Tower, an Irish Wolfhound and a harp.

=== Kit evolution ===
Kerry traditional colours are gold and green and the county team kits are composed by a green shirt with a single golden hoop, white shorts and green and gold socks. In the early days of the All-Ireland Football Championship, counties were represented by the county champions. Kerry's first representatives were from Laune Rangers, and the blue of Laune Rangers was worn in Kerry's first championship outing in 1889. The royal blue of Laune Rangers were also worn in the 1892 All-Ireland Senior Football Championship Final. Between 1889 and 1895 inclusive, the teams that went forward to represent Kerry were Laune Rangers and Ballymacelligott, who both wore blue.

In the early 20th century, selection committees had been established by the county board, but as Tralee Mitchels dominated the county championship, they had an influential voice in the selection of the team, and the county footballers wore the Mitchels' colours of green and gold.

There are conflicting accounts of the jersey that Kerry wore in the first of the three games of the 1903 All-Ireland Senior Football Championship Final series with Kildare, but both accounts agree that the predominant colour was red. One account says that it was a red jersey with green neck and cuffs, which were the colours of the Tralee Mitchels junior football team. Another account says that it was an entirely red jersey with no green in it. The reason that Kerry wore this red or mainly red jersey was that a new set of green and gold jerseys was not delivered in time for the game. For the later games in the 1903 series of games, Kerry wore green jerseys with gold on the cuffs and over the shoulders. These were the colours of the Tralee Mitchels senior team.

The dominance of players from the Mitchels club on the Kerry team at the point in which they won their first All-Ireland, reinforced the idea that green and gold were the Kerry colours, and they have been Kerry's traditional colours from the 1903 triumph onward. The 'classic' style is green with a gold hoop. The colours have been changed only rarely, most of all in the 80's finals against Offaly to avoid again colour clashes. In the 1939 All-Ireland Senior Football Championship Final Kerry were to play Meath, who also wear green and gold. To avoid a colour clash, Kerry wore the red and white of Dingle, the county champions at the time.

The change kit is usually blue, reflecting the Munster GAA colours.

1889–1895	1903	1904–25	c. 1926–present

=== Team sponsorship ===
Kerry's inter-county teams are sponsored by the Kerry Group, in one of the longest standing sponsorship arrangements in the GAA. The teams have been connected with the Kerry Group since sponsorship became more open in the GAA in the early 1990s.

Kerry's jerseys are currently provided by O'Neills sportswear. The team kit had been supplied from 1996 to 1998 by Adidas, while prior to that contract in 1998, Kerry were partnered with the now-defunct Millfield brand.

== Competitive record ==
This is Kerry's record in All-Ireland SFC finals. Bold denotes a year in which the team won the competition.

Year	Venue	Result	Attendance
1892	Clonturk	Dublin 1–4 Kerry 0–3	Not known
**1903**	Jones' Road	Kerry 0–11 London 0–3	Not known
**1904**	Jones' Road	Kerry 0–5 Dublin 0–2	Not known
1905	Thurles	Kildare 1–7 Kerry 0–5	Not known
**1909**	Jones' Road	Kerry 1–9 Louth 0–6	Not Known
1910	Louth won because Kerry refused to travel
**1913**	Croke Park	Kerry 2–2 Wexford 0–3	17,000
**1914**	Croke Park	Kerry 1–3 Wexford 0–6	13,000
	Croke Park	Replay: Kerry 2–3 Wexford 0–6	20,000
1915	Croke Park	Wexford 2–4 Kerry 2–1	27,000
1923	Croke Park	Dublin 1–5 Kerry 1–3	20,000
**1924**	Croke Park	Kerry 0–4 Dublin 0–3	28,844
**1926**	Croke Park	Kerry 1–3 Kildare 0–6	37,500
	Croke Park	Replay: Kerry 1–4 Kildare 0–4	35,500
1927	Croke Park	Kildare 0–5 Kerry 0–3	36,529
**1929**	Croke Park	Kerry 1–8 Kildare 1–5	43,839
**1930**	Croke Park	Kerry 3–11 Monaghan 0–2	33,280
**1931**	Croke Park	Kerry 1–11 Kildare 0–8	42,550
**1932**	Croke Park	Kerry 2–7 Mayo 2–4	25,816
**1937**	Croke Park	Kerry 2–5 Cavan 1–8	52,325
	Croke Park	Replay: Kerry 4–4 Cavan 1–7	51,234
1938	Croke Park	Galway 3–3 Kerry 2–6	68,950
	Croke Park	Replay: Galway 2–4 Kerry 0–7	47,581
**1939**	Croke Park	Kerry 2–5 Meath 2–3	46,828
1940	Croke Park	Kerry 0–7 Galway 1–3	60,824
**1941**	Croke Park	Kerry 1–8 Galway 0–7	45,512
**1944**	Croke Park	Roscommon 1–9 Kerry 2–4	79,245
**1946**	Croke Park	Kerry 2–4 Roscommon 1–7	75,771
	Croke Park	Replay: Kerry 2–8 Roscommon 0–10	65,661
1947	Polo Grounds, New York	Cavan 2–11 Kerry 2–7	34,941
**1953**	Croke Park	Kerry 0–13 Armagh 1–6	86,155
1954	Croke Park	Meath 1–13 Kerry 1–7	72,276
**1955**	Croke Park	Kerry 0–12 Dublin 1–6	87,102
**1959**	Croke Park	Kerry 3–7 Galway 1–4	85,897
1960	Croke Park	Down 2–10 Kerry 0–8	87,768
**1962**	Croke Park	Kerry 1–12 Roscommon 1–6	75,771
1964	Croke Park	Galway 0–15 Kerry 0–10	76,498
1965	Croke Park	Galway 0–12 Kerry 0–9	77,735
1968	Croke Park	Down 2–12 Kerry 1–13	71,294
**1969**	Croke Park	Kerry 0–10 Offaly 0–7	67,828
**1970**	Croke Park	Kerry 2–19 Meath 0–18	71,755
1972	Croke Park	Offaly 1–13 Kerry 1–13	72,032
	Croke Park	Replay: Offaly 1–19 Kerry 0–13	66,136
**1975**	Croke Park	Kerry 2–12 Dublin 0–11	66,346
1976	Croke Park	Dublin 3–8 Kerry 0–10	73,588
**1978**	Croke Park	Kerry 5–11 Dublin 0–9	71,503
**1979**	Croke Park	Kerry 3–13 Dublin 1–8	72,185
**1980**	Croke Park	Kerry 1–9 Roscommon 1–6	63,854
**1981**	Croke Park	Kerry 1–12 Offaly 0–8	61,489
1982	Croke Park	Offaly 1–15 Kerry 0–17	62,309
**1984**	Croke Park	Kerry 0–14 Dublin 1–6	68,365
**1985**	Croke Park	Kerry 2–12 Dublin 2–8	69,389
**1986**	Croke Park	Kerry 2–15 Tyrone 1–10	68,628
**1997**	Croke Park	Kerry 0–13 Mayo 1–7	65,601
**2000**	Croke Park	Kerry 0–14 Galway 0–14	63,349
	Croke Park	Replay: Kerry 0–17 Galway 1–10	64,094
2002	Croke Park	Armagh 1–12 Kerry 0–14	79,500
**2004**	Croke Park	Kerry 1–20 Mayo 2–9	Not known
2005	Croke Park	Tyrone 1–16 Kerry 2–10	79,500
**2006**	Croke Park	Kerry 4–15 Mayo 3–5	82,500
**2007**	Croke Park	Kerry 3–13 Cork 1–9	82,126
2008	Croke Park	Tyrone 1–15 Kerry 0–14	82,204
**2009**	Croke Park	Kerry 0–16 Cork 1–09	82,286
2011	Croke Park	Dublin 1–12 Kerry 1–11	82,300
**2014**	Croke Park	Kerry 2–09 Donegal 0–12
2015	Croke Park	Dublin 0–12 Kerry 0–09
2019	Croke Park	Dublin 1–16 Kerry 1–16
	Croke Park	Replay: Dublin 1–18 Kerry 0–15
**2022**	Croke Park	Kerry 0–20 Galway 0–16
**2025**	Croke Park	Kerry 1–26 Donegal 0–19
**2026**	Croke Park	Mayo 1–20 Kerry 1–17

== Honours ==
Kerry has won a record 39 All-Ireland Senior Football Championships and has been the loser in 24 other All-Ireland SFC finals.

Kerry has also won the most Munster Senior Football Championships, with 86 titles.

=== National ===
- All-Ireland Senior Football Championship
  - (gold) Winners (39): 1903, 1904, 1909, 1913, 1914, 1924, 1926, 1929, 1930, 1931, 1932, 1937, 1939, 1940, 1941, 1946, 1953, 1955, 1959, 1962, 1969, 1970, 1975, 1978, 1979, 1980, 1981, 1984, 1985, 1986, 1997, 2000, 2004, 2006, 2007, 2009, 2014, 2022, 2025
  - (silver) Runners-up (25): 1892, 1905, 1910, 1915, 1923, 1927, 1938, 1944, 1947, 1954, 1960, 1964, 1965, 1968, 1972, 1976, 1982, 2002, 2005, 2008, 2011, 2015, 2019, 2023, 2026
- National Football League
  - (gold) Winners (24): 1927–28, 1928–29, 1930–31, 1931–32, 1958–59, 1960–61, 1962–63, 1968–69, 1970–71, 1971–72, 1972–73, 1973–74, 1976–77, 1981–82, 1983–84, 1996–97, 2004, 2006, 2009, 2017, 2020, 2021 (shared), 2022, 2025
  - (silver) Runners-up (8): 1956–57, 1964–65, 1979–80, 1986–87, 2008, 2016, 2019, 2026
- National Football League Division 2
  - (gold) Winners (1): 2002
- All-Ireland Junior Football Championship
  - (gold) Winners (20): 1913, 1915, 1924, 1928, 1930, 1941, 1949, 1954, 1963, 1967, 1983, 1991, 1994, 2006, 2012, 2015, 2016, 2017, 2018, 2019
- All-Ireland Under-21 Football Championship
  - (gold) Winners (11): 1964, 1973, 1975, 1976, 1977, 1990, 1995, 1996, 1998, 2008, 2026
  - (silver) Runners-up (8): 1967, 1972, 1978, 1987, 1991, 1993, 1999, 2024
- All-Ireland Minor Football Championship
  - (gold) Winners (16): 1931, 1932, 1933, 1946, 1950, 1962, 1963, 1975, 1980, 1988, 1994, 2014, 2015, 2016, 2017, 2018
  - (silver) Runners-up (14): 1936, 1938, 1949, 1954, 1965, 1970, 1979, 1982, 1990, 1996, 2004, 2006, 2020, 2025
- All-Ireland Vocational Schools Championship
  - (gold) Winners (9): 1973, 1977, 1978, 1986, 1987, 1990, 1992, 1993, 1997

=== Provincial ===
- Munster Senior Football Championship
  - (gold) Winners (87): 1892, 1903, 1904, 1905, 1908, 1909, 1910, 1912, 1913, 1914, 1915, 1919, 1923, 1924, 1925, 1926, 1927, 1929, 1930, 1931, 1932, 1933, 1934, 1936, 1937, 1938, 1939, 1940, 1941, 1942, 1944, 1946, 1947, 1948, 1950, 1951, 1953, 1954, 1955, 1958, 1959, 1960, 1961, 1962, 1963, 1964, 1965, 1968, 1969, 1970, 1972, 1975, 1976, 1977, 1978, 1979, 1980, 1981, 1982, 1984, 1985, 1986, 1991, 1996, 1997, 1998, 2000, 2001, 2003, 2004, 2005, 2007, 2010, 2011, 2013, 2014, 2015, 2016, 2017, 2018, 2019, 2021, 2022, 2023, 2024, 2025, 2026
  - (silver) Runners-up (24): 1890, 1893, 1900, 1902, 1906, 1918, 1920, 1945, 1952, 1956, 1966, 1967, 1971, 1973, 1974, 1983, 1987, 1988, 1989, 1990, 1992, 1999, 2006, 2008
- Munster Football League
  - (gold) Winners (1): 1926
- McGrath Cup
  - (gold) Winners (6): 1996, 2010, 2011, 2013, 2017, 2022
- Munster Junior Football Championship
  - (gold) Winners (46): 1913, 1914, 1915, 1924, 1926, 1927, 1928, 1930, 1931, 1934, 1936, 1938, 1941, 1946, 1947, 1949, 1954, 1956, 1958, 1959, 1960, 1961, 1963, 1965, 1967, 1968, 1969, 1983, 1985, 1991, 1994, 1995, 1997, 2000, 2002, 2003, 2006, 2008, 2010, 2012, 2014, 2015, 2016, 2017, 2018, 2019
- Munster Under-21/Under-20 Football Championship (under-20 since 2018)
  - (gold) Winners (33): 1962, 1964, 1966, 1967, 1968, 1972, 1973, 1975, 1976, 1977, 1978, 1983, 1987, 1988, 1990, 1991, 1992, 1993, 1995, 1996, 1997, 1998, 1999, 2002, 2008, 2017, 2018, 2020, 2022, 2023, 2024, 2025, 2026
  - (silver) Runners-up (12): 1963, 1969, 1974, 1981, 1982, 2003, 2004, 2010, 2011, 2012, 2016, 2019
- Munster Minor Football Championship
  - (gold) Winners (52): 1931, 1932, 1933, 1936, 1937, 1938, 1940, 1941, 1945, 1946, 1947, 1948, 1949, 1950, 1951, 1954, 1957, 1958, 1962, 1963, 1965, 1970, 1975, 1978, 1979, 1980, 1982, 1988, 1989, 1990, 1994, 1996, 1997, 1998, 2001, 2002, 2003, 2004, 2006, 2008, 2009, 2013, 2014, 2015, 2016, 2017, 2018, 2019, 2020, 2023, 2024, 2025
  - (silver) Runners-up (30): 1939, 1955, 1956, 1959, 1960, 1966, 1967, 1968, 1969, 1971, 1972, 1973, 1974, 1976, 1977, 1981, 1984, 1985, 1986, 1987, 1991, 1992, 1999, 2000, 2005, 2007, 2010, 2012, 2022, 2026
