= 1891 All-Ireland Senior Football Championship final =

Gaelic football final

- Event: 1891 All-Ireland Senior Football Championship
Dublin	Cork
2–1	1–9
- A goal outweighed any number of points
- Date: 28 February 1892
- Venue: Clonturk Park, Dublin
- Referee: T. J. Whelan (Laois)
- Attendance: 4,000
- Weather: Fine

The 1891 All-Ireland Senior Football Championship final was the fourth All-Ireland Senior Football Final and the culmination of the 1891 All-Ireland Senior Football Championship.

It took place at Clonturk Park on 28 February 1892, but had been due to take place a week earlier, on 21 February, however it was postponed owing to a snow storm.

Counties were represented by club teams in the early years of the GAA, and Dublin was represented by Young Irelands while Clondrochid represented Cork.

This was the last All-Ireland Final to be played where a goal outweighed any number of points.

It was the first of six All-Ireland SFC titles won by Dublin in the 1890s.

== Match ==
=== Summary ===
The game was immediately preceded by the 1891 All-Ireland Senior Hurling Championship Final which was won by Kerry, who defeated Wexford. Dublin had started the day not yet qualified for the final, having to beat Cavan in the opening game of the day.

In the final, Dublin led Cork at half time by 2-0 to 0-2. In the second half, Cork dominated, scoring another 1-7, however as a goal outweighed any number of points, Dublin were declared the winners. Cork claimed that another goal had been scored and were reported to have appealed the decision to Central Council but the result of the appeal is unknown.

=== Details ===
28 February 1892

Dublin	2-1 - 1-9	Cork

Clonturk Park, Drumcondra
Referee: T.J. Whelan (Laois)

Dublin
J Kennedy (c)
G Charlemont (goal.)
G Roche
J Scully
T Lyons
J Roche
J Silke
P Heslin
J Mahony
A O’Hagan
P O’Hagan
D Curtis
S Hughes
S Flood
T Murphy
J Geraghty
T Halpin
M Cooney
P Kelly
R Flood
M Condon

Cork
Con O’Leary (c)
Denis O’Leary
J O’Leary
Dan O’Leary
D J Kelleher
J Kelleher
Con Kelleher
Jer Kelleher
C Duggan
J Duggan
A Desmond
P Desmond
T O’Riordan
M O’Riordan
M Quill
J O’Sullivan
J Murphy
D O’Sullivan
T O’Shea
J Ahern
M Kelleher
