= National Football League (Ireland) records and statistics =

This is a list of records from the National Football League, a Gaelic football competition for county teams in Ireland.

== Team ==
- Most League titles: Kerry (24)
- Best record in League finals: Kerry, 24 wins and 8 losses (75%) — note that Kerry won the 2020 league which had no final, while the 2021 final was not played, Kerry and Dublin sharing the title
- Worst record in League finals: Kildare, 0 wins and 5 losses (0%)
- Most consecutive wins: 6, Mayo, from 1933–34 to 1938–39
- Longest gap between League titles: 60 years, Laois, 1925–26 and 1985–86

== Scoring ==
David Tubridy of Clare became top scorer in National Football League history against Cork in May 2021.

=== All-time scoring record ===
As of 1 June 2021, with scores in bolded italics by Tubridy and McManus because they continued to play after this time

- David Tubridy **22–412 (478)**
- Mickey Kearins 7–448 (469)
- Ronan Carolan 19–387 (444)
- Tony McTague 9–360 (387)
- Mattie Forde 29–299 (386)
- Conor McManus **14–341 (383)**
- Steven McDonnell 33–282 (381)
- Brian Stafford 13–334 (373)
- Mick O'Dwyer 19–313 (370)
- Dermot Earley Snr 17–316 (367)

=== Top scorers for each team ===
- Antrim:
- Armagh: Steven McDonnell
- Carlow:
- Cavan: Ronan Carolan
- Clare: David Tubridy
- Cork:
- Derry:
- Donegal:
- Down:
- Dublin: Dean Rock
- Fermanagh:
- Galway:
- Kerry: Mick O'Dwyer
- Kildare:
- Laois:
- Leitrim:
- Limerick:
- London:
- Longford:
- Louth:
- Mayo:
- Meath: Brian Stafford
- Monaghan: Conor McManus
- Offaly: Tony McTague
- Roscommon: Dermot Earley Snr
- Sligo: Mickey Kearins
- Tipperary:
- Tyrone:
- Waterford:
- Westmeath:
- Wexford: Mattie Forde
- Wicklow:
