= Dick Curtis (Gaelic footballer) =

Irish Gaelic footballer

Personal information
- Native name: Risteard de Cuirtéis (Irish)

Sport
- Sport: Gaelic football
Club
- Years: Club
- Young Irelands
Club titles
- Dublin titles: 5
Inter-county
- Years: County
- 1891-1897: Dublin
Inter-county titles
- Leinster titles: 5
- All-Irelands: 4

Richard Curtis was an Irish Gaelic footballer. His championship career at senior level with the Dublin county team lasted seven seasons from 1891 until 1897.

Curtis first played competitive football with the Young Irelands club. He won five county senior championship medals with the club between 1891 and 1896.

Young Irelands represented Dublin in the championship, with Curtis making his inter-county debut during the 1891 championship. Over the following seven seasons, he won four All-Ireland medals - the first player to do so. Curtis also won five Leinster medals.

== Honours ==
Young Irelands

- Dublin Senior Football Championship (5): 1891, 1892, 1893, 1894, 1896

Dublin

- All-Ireland Senior Football Championship (4): 1891, 1892, 1894, 1897
- Leinster Senior Football Championship (5): 1891, 1892, 1894, 1896, 1897
