= Charlemont =

Charlemont may refer to:

== Places ==
- Charlemont, County Armagh, a village in Northern Ireland
  - Charlemont (Parliament of Ireland constituency), a former constituency
  - Charlemont Luas stop, a tram stop in Dublin
- Charlemont, Massachusetts, a town in the United States
- Charlemont, Victoria, a suburb of Geelong in Australia
- Charlemont and Grove Vale, a political ward in Sandwell, England
- Fortress of Charlemont, a fortification along the Belgian border in Givet, France

== People ==
- George Charlemont (1873–1907), Irish Gaelic footballer
- Joseph Charlemont (1839–1918), French savate and canne de combat teacher
- Viscount Charlemont and other titles in the peerage of Ireland
- James Caulfeild, 1st Earl of Charlemont
