= Dublin–Meath Gaelic football rivalry =

Sports rivalry in Ireland

Dublin-Meath
- Location: County Dublin; County Meath
- Teams: Dublin; Meath
- First meeting: Dublin 0-4 - Meath 0-4; 1894 Leinster final (14 October 1894)
- Latest meeting: Meath 0-23 - 1-16 Dublin; 2025 Leinster semi-final (27 April 2025)

Statistics
- Total meetings: 70
- Most wins: Dublin (40)
- All-time series: Dublin 40-8-20 Meath

The Dublin-Meath rivalry is a Gaelic football rivalry between Irish county teams Dublin and Meath, who first played each other in 1894. It is considered to be one of the biggest rivalries in Gaelic games. Dublin's home ground is Parnell Park and Meath's home ground is Páirc Tailteann, however, many of their championship meetings have been held at neutral venues, usually Croke Park.

While Dublin have the highest number of Leinster titles and Meath are ranked second on the roll of honour, they have also enjoyed success in the All-Ireland Senior Football Championship, having won 35 championship titles between them to date.

Regarded as one of the greatest rivalries in Gaelic football, a Leinster final between Dublin and Meath is regarded as a special occasion.

== Statistics ==
Team	All-Ireland	Provincial	National League	Total
Dublin	31	63	14	108
Meath	7	21	7	35
Combined	38	84	21	143

== Notable moments ==
- Popular rivalry during Dublin's 2 in a row (1976-1977) and Meath's 2 in a row as All Ireland championship (1987-1988).
- In first round of the 1991 Leinster championship the famous 4.
- Since Navan in 1961 expect for Navan in 1980 and Portlaoise in 2025 when Meath ended Dublin's long spell of winning Leinster titles all fixtures have been played at Croke Park.

== All-time results ==
=== Legend ===
Dublin win
Meath win
Match was a draw

=== Senior ===
No.	Date	Winners	Score	Runners-up	Venue	Stage
1.	14 October 1894	Dublin	0-4- 0-4	Meath	Clonturk	Leinster final
2.	15 December 1894	Dublin	0-2- 0-2	Meath	Navan	Leinster final replay
3.	24 February 1895	Dublin	1-8- 1-2	Meath	Clonturk Park	Leinster final 2nd replay
4.	1 March 1896	Meath	0-6 - 0-2	Dublin	Jones's Road	Leinster final
5.	24 October 1897	Dublin	2-4 - 1-5	Meath	Jones's Road	Leinster final
6.	1908	Dublin	0-0 - 0-0	Meath	Jones's Road	Leinster quarter-final
7.	1908	Dublin	1-9 - 0-1	Meath	Jones's Road	Leinster quarter-final replay
8.	1911	Meath	1-3 - 0-2	Dublin	Jones's Road	Leinster semi-final
9.	1919	Dublin	0-7 - 0-2	Dublin	Navan	Leinster quarter-final
11.	1921	Dublin	3-6 - 0-0	Meath	Croke Park	Leinster quarter-final
12.	12 August 1923	Dublin	3-5 - 0-0	Meath	Croke Park	Leinster final
13.	1924	Dublin	2-3 - 1-4	Meath	Navan	Leinster Preliminary round
14.	29 June 1930	Meath	3-8 - 0-4	Dublin	Drogheda Park	Leinster quarter-final
15.	1932	Dublin	3-6 - 0-4	Meath	Newbridge	Leinster Preliminary round
16.	11 June 1933	Dublin	1-8 - 1-4	Meath	Drogheda Park	Leinster quarter-final
17.	8 July 1934	Dublin	2-8 - 2-9	Meath	Drogheda Park	Leinster semi-final
18.	7 July 1940	Meath	1-7 - 0-4	Dublin	St. Conleth's Park	Leinster semi-final
19.	1 June 1941	Dublin	1-8 - 1-6	Meath	Cusack Park	Leinster quarter-final
20.	31 May 1942	Dublin	3-5 - 1-3	Meath	Drogheda Park	Leinster semi-final
21.	28 May 1944	Dublin	3-6 - 4-3	Meath	Drogheda Park	Leinster quarter-final
22.	10 June 1945	Meath	3-6 - 4-3	Dublin	Drogheda Park	Leinster quarter-final
23.	17 June 1945	Meath	2-16 - 1-10	Dublin	Croke Park	Leinster quarter-final replay
24.	3 June 1951	Meath	0-11 - 1-5	Dublin	Drogheda Park	Leinster quarter-final
25.	25 May 1952	Meath	2-7 - 2-5	Dublin	Drogheda Park	Leinster quarter-final
26.	24 May 1953	Meath	2-6 - 2-5	Dublin	Páirc Tailteann	Leinster quarter-final
27.	24 July 1955	Dublin	5-12 - 0-7	Meath	Croke Park	Leinster final
28.	1 June 1958	Dublin	1-12 - 2-7	Meath	Drogheda Park	Leinster quarter-final
29.	9 July 1961	Dublin	4-14 - 1-7	Meath	Páirc Tailteann	Leinster semi-final
30.	2 June 1963	Dublin	2-6 - 2-5	Meath	Croke Park	Leinster quarter-final
31.	26 July 1964	Meath	2-12 - 1-7	Dublin	Croke Park	Leinster final
32.	28 July 1974	Dublin	1-14 - 1-9	Meath	Croke Park	Leinster final
33.	25 July 1976	Dublin	2-8 - 1-9	Meath	Croke Park	Leinster final
34.	31 July 1977	Dublin	1-9 - 0-8	Meath	Croke Park	Leinster final
35.	6 July 1980	Dublin	3-13 - 2-7	Meath	Páirc Tailteann	Leinster semi-final
36.	12 June 1983	Dublin	2-8 - 2-8	Meath	Croke Park	Leinster quarter-final
37.	3 July 1983	Dublin	3-9 - 0-16	Meath	Croke Park	Leinster quarter-final replay
38.	22 July 1984	Dublin	2-10 - 1-7	Meath	Croke Park	Leinster final
39.	27 July 1986	Meath	0-9 - 0-7	Dublin	Croke Park	Leinster final
40.	26 July 1987	Meath	1-13 - 0-12	Dublin	Croke Park	Leinster final
41.	31 July 1988	Meath	2-5 - 0-9	Dublin	Croke Park	Leinster final
42.	30 July 1989	Dublin	2-12 - 1-10	Meath	Croke Park	Leinster final
43.	29 July 1990	Meath	1-14 - 0-14	Dublin	Croke Park	Leinster final
44.	2 June 1991	Meath	1-12 - 1-12	Dublin	Croke Park	Leinster Preliminary round
45.	9 June 1991	Meath	1-11 - 1-11	Dublin	Croke Park	Leinster Preliminary round replay
46.	23 June 1991	Meath	2-11 - 1-14	Dublin	Croke Park	Leinster Preliminary round 2nd replay
47.	6 July 1991	Meath	2-10 - 0-15	Dublin	Croke Park	Leinster Preliminary round 3rd replay
48.	4 July 1993	Dublin	1-10 - 0-12	Meath	Croke Park	Leinster semi-final
49.	31 July 1994	Dublin	1-9 - 1-8	Meath	Croke Park	Leinster final
50.	30 July 1995	Dublin	1-18 - 1-8	Meath	Croke Park	Leinster final
51.	28 July 1996	Meath	0-10 - 0-8	Dublin	Croke Park	Leinster final
52.	15 June 1997	Meath	1-13 - 1-10	Dublin	Croke Park	Leinster quarter-final
53.	1 August 1999	Meath	1-14 - 0-12	Dublin	Croke Park	Leinster final
54.	15 July 2001	Meath	2-11 - 0-14	Dublin	Croke Park	Leinster final
55.	23 June 2002	Dublin	2-11 - 0-10	Meath	Croke Park	Leinster semi-final
56.	5 June 2005	Dublin	1-12 - 1-10	Meath	Croke Park	Leinster quarter-final
57.	3 June 2007	Dublin	1-11 - 0-14	Meath	Croke Park	Leinster quarter-final
58.	17 June 2007	Dublin	0-16 - 0-12	Meath	Croke Park	Leinster quarter-final replay
59.	7 June 2009	Dublin	0-14 - 0-12	Meath	Croke Park	Leinster quarter-final
60.	27 June 2010	Meath	5-9 - 0-13	Dublin	Croke Park	Leinster semi-final
61.	22 July 2012	Dublin	2-13 - 1-13	Meath	Croke Park	Leinster final
62.	14 July 2013	Dublin	2-15 - 0-14	Meath	Croke Park	Leinster final
63.	20 July 2014	Dublin	3-20 - 1-10	Meath	Croke Park	Leinster final
64.	26 June 2016	Dublin	0-21 - 0-11	Meath	Croke Park	Leinster semi-final
65.	23 June 2019	Dublin	1-17 - 0-4	Meath	Croke Park	Leinster final
66.	21 November 2020	Dublin	3-21 - 0-9	Meath	Croke Park	Leinster final
67.	18 July 2021	Dublin	2-16 - 1-13	Meath	Croke Park	Leinster semi-final
68.	15 May 2022	Dublin	1-27 - 1-14	Meath	Croke Park	Leinster semi-final
69.	14 April 2024	Dublin	3-19 - 0-12	Meath	Croke Park	Leinster quarter-final
70.	27 April 2025	Meath	0-23 - 1-16	Dublin	O'Moore Park	Leinster semi-final
