= George Roche (Gaelic footballer) =

Irish Gaelic footballer

Personal information
- Native name: Seoirse de Róiste (Irish)
- Died: 3 April 1942 Aughrim, County Wicklow, Ireland
- Occupation: Brewery employee

Sport
- Sport: Gaelic football
Club
- Years: Club
- Young Irelands
Club titles
- Dublin titles: 5
Inter-county
- Years: County
- 1891-1896: Dublin
Inter-county titles
- Leinster titles: 4
- All-Irelands: 3

George Roche was an Irish Gaelic footballer. His championship career at senior level with the Dublin county team lasted six seasons from 1891 until 1896.

== Career ==
Roche first played competitive football with the Young Irelands club. He won five county senior championship medals with the club between 1891 and 1896.

Young Irelands represented Dublin in the championship, with Roche making his inter-county debut during the 1891 championship. Over the following six seasons, he won three All-Ireland medals. Roche also won four Leinster medals.

== Honours ==
Young Irelands

- Dublin Senior Football Championship: 1891, 1892, 1893, 1894, 1896

Dublin

- All-Ireland Senior Football Championship: 1891, 1892, 1894
- Leinster Senior Football Championship: 1891, 1892, 1894, 1896 (c)

Sporting positions
Preceded by	Dublin Senior Football Captain; 1896	Succeeded by P. J. Walsh
