= Dublin–Kerry Gaelic football rivalry =

Gaelic football rivalry

Dublin-Kerry
- Location: County Dublin; County Kerry
- Teams: Dublin; Kerry
- First meeting: Dublin 1-4 - Kerry 0-3; 1892 All-Ireland final (26 March 1892)
- Latest meeting: Kerry 2-18 - 0-20 Dublin; 2026 All-Ireland semi-final (12 July 2026)

Statistics
- Total meetings: 34
- Most wins: Kerry (19)
- Top scorer: Mikey Sheehy (3-27)
- All-time series: Kerry 19-3-12 Dublin
- Largest victory: Kerry 5-11 - 0-9 Dublin; 1978 All-Ireland final (24 September 1978)

The Dublin-Kerry rivalry is a Gaelic football rivalry between Irish county teams Dublin and Kerry, who first played each other in 1892. It is considered to be one of the biggest rivalries in Gaelic games, with many considering it the greatest of all GAA rivalries. Dublin's home ground is Parnell Park and Kerry's home ground is Fitzgerald Stadium; however, all of their championship meetings have been held at neutral venues, usually Croke Park.

While Dublin have the highest number of Leinster titles and Kerry are the standard bearers in Munster, they are also the two most successful teams in the All-Ireland Senior Football Championship, having won 70 championship titles between them to date.

Regarded as the "big two" of Gaelic football, an All-Ireland final between Dublin and Kerry is regarded as a special occasion and the ultimate urban-rural battle. It is the most common All-Ireland final pairing.

== History ==
=== 1975–1979: the greatest era ===
Their first meeting in a decade and their first All-Ireland final clash in twenty years, reigning champions Dublin faced a young and inexperienced Kerry team on 28 September 1975. The Dubs were stunned after just three minutes when John Egan pounced for the opening goal. At half-time, Kerry led by 1-6 to 0-4. Jimmy Keaveney points from placed balls kept the Dubs in touch to some degree in the second half, but Kerry always had that extra gear they could use and a Ger O'Driscoll goal and a Pat Spillane sealed a surprise 2-12 to 0-11 victory. Kerry captain Mickey "Ned" O'Sullivan was unable to accept the Sam Maguire Cup as he was knocked unconscious during the game and had to be hospitalised.

For the second successive year, Dublin and Kerry qualified for the All-Ireland final on 26 September 1976. The Dubs unveiled a new hero when Kevin Moran careered through the Kerry defence, took a return pass from Bernard Brogan and sent a shot screaming narrowly wide to set the pace for a fast, thrilling match. John McCarthy finished a five-man move for their first goal after fifteen minutes. Jimmy Keaveney converted a penalty at the start of the second half before Brian Mullins bagged a third with twelve minutes remaining. The 3-8 to 0-10 victory was Dublin's first defeat of Kerry since 1934.

On 21 August 1977, Dublin and Kerry met for the third successive year in what has been described as the greatest game of all time. Kerry were a goal to the good at the break - their green flag coming from Seán Walsh - in a period where Dublin hit eight wides. However, it was Dublin's dominance of midfield in the second period and Bernard Brogan's introduction in that sector, that saw Dublin gain a real foothold. John McCarthy goaled shortly after the break to bring the sides level. Points were exchanged thereafter as the intensity level ratcheted up. Yet, it was the Dubs' graph that was rising faster. In a move started by Brian Mullins, the ball eventually found its way to Tony Hanahoe, who slipped it off to David Hickey and the latter shot brilliantly to the back of the net for Dublin's second goal. Goal number three saw Hickey, Hanahoe and Bobby Doyle combine to set up Bernard Brogan for the clinching score as Dublin ran out five-point winners.

...and suddenly Paddy dashed back towards his goal like a
woman who smells a cake burning. The ball won the race
and it curled inside the near post as Paddy crashed into the
outside of the net and lay against it like a fireman who had
returned to find his station ablaze.

— Con Houlihan describes Paddy Cullen's futile dash to save
Mikey Sheehy's lobbed effort in the 1978 All-Ireland final.

Dublin were the red hot favourites to make it three All-Ireland titles in-a-row in 1978 as they faced Kerry in the All-Ireland decider on 24 September 1978. All was going well for the Dubs as they had a five-point lead after twenty minutes. What subsequently unfolded was one of the most amazing turnarounds in All-Ireland final history.text In the 32nd minute a foul was awarded against Dublin goalkeeper Paddy Cullen who continued to remonstrate with the referee as Mikey Sheehy lined up to take the free. Sheehy lobbed the ball into an empty net over the back-pedaling Cullen, who crashed into the side netting. The Kerry full-forward line scored 5-8 between them, with Eoin "Bomber" Liston scoring a hat-trick of goals in the second half to secure a 5-11 to 0-9 victory.

For the fifth successive championship season, Dublin and Kerry faced each other in the All-Ireland series on 16 September 1979. Starting without Ger Power, losing John O'Keeffe to injury and having Páidí Ó Sé sent off did not deter Kerry, who crushed Dublin with a shattering Mikey Sheehy goal after ten minutes, another Sheehy penalty after 56 minutes and a John Egan goal eight minutes from the end. Jim Ronayne's controversial hand-passed goal provided little solace for Dublin, whose 3-13 to 1-8 defeat brought the curtain down on their great team of the decade.

=== 1984-1985: Kerry dominate ===
After a five-year absence, Dublin and Kerry faced each other in the All-Ireland decider on 23 September 1984. Dublin were the reigning All-Ireland champions and were well fancied to retain the title as Kerry had lost the 1982 All-Ireland final to Offaly and the 1983 Munster final to Cork. Bizarrely, an article in the RTÉ Guide described the Kerry squad as "a cowardly blend of experienced players, has-beens and a few newcomers" and acted as motivation for the entire team. Kerry led by 0-7 to 0-3 at half-time and by six points when Barney Rock scored Dublin's goal. Kerry responded by stretching on again. Dublin's return of 1-6, from only two scoring forwards, was their lowest against Kerry since 1955. The 0-14 to 1-6 victory gave Kerry the Centenary All-Ireland title.

Dublin and Kerry qualified for the All-Ireland decider once again on 22 September 1985. Kerry proved that they were far from finished and seized the initiative with a Jack O'Shea penalty after 11 minutes. Dublin tailed by nine points at the interval, however, they came storming back with two goals by Joe McNally. A Timmy O'Dowd goal steadied Kerry as they went on to retain the title by 2-12 to 2-8.

=== 2001-2009: 21st century revival ===
After a 17-year hiatus, Dublin and Kerry renewed their rivalry in an All-Ireland quarter-final at Semple Stadium, Thurles on 4 August 2001. Kerry had been in charge for three quarters of the match, with Dara Ó Cinnéide contributing six points, primarily from placed balls, and also providing the pass for Aodán Mac Gearailt to score a goal after just 11 minutes. For long stages it looked like Kerry would run out easy winners as Collie Moran and Dessie Farrell spurned two goal chances in the first half. After 46 minutes Kerry were eight points clear. When referee Michael Curley awarded Kerry a somewhat dubious free, Dublin manager Tommy Carr was quick to vent his frustration and remonstrated strongly with the Galway official. That face-off brought Dublin to life. Vinny Murphy and Darren Homan bagged quick-fire goals as Dublin scored 2-3 without replay to give them a one-point lead as the game drew to a close. When Dublin goalkeeper David Byrne miscued his kick-out, Maurice Fitzgerald responded with what has been described as the greatest point in the history of the championship. 45 metres out on the sideline and with the outside of his right boot, Fitzgerald steered the football over the bar to level the game. Dublin still had a chance to win but substitute Wayne McCarthy didn’t have the distance into the wind from a 45 straight in front of the posts and the game ended in a 2-11 to 1-14 draw.

The All-Ireland quarter-final replay a week later on 11 August 2001 was also played at the home of hurling. Johnny Crowley, who was held scoreless in the drawn match, was unmarkable in the replay as he helped himself to 2-2. He slipped past Paddy Christie on 13 minutes to score his first goal and when the Dublin defender slipped to the turf in the 22nd minute, Crowley once again fired the ball past David Byrne. In nine minutes Dublin went from being level to conceding 2-4 while managing just a point themselves. Kerry were reduced to fourteen men when Tomás Ó Sé was handed a straight red card for a foul on Collie Moran as the Dublin player bore down on goal. The Dubs had two opportunities to rescue a draw, the first of which occurred in the 69th minute when corner back Coman Goggins raced towards goal but Kerry goalkeeper Declan O'Keeffe managed to save and the ball was cleared after a goalmouth scramble. Dublin substitute Niall O'Donoghue had an injury-time shot on goal blocked by Kerry centre back Eamonn Fitzmaurice. A brace of late points from Wayne McCarthy narrowed the deficit to three points but there was to be no late heroics to rescue Dublin who were defeated by 2-12 to 1-12.

On 14 August 2004, Dublin and Kerry renewed their All-Ireland quarter-final rivalry in what was their first Croke Park meeting in almost twenty years. In a game of two halves, Dublin dominated the first in terms of territory, possession and goal chances. Midfielder Darren Homan kicked two points and dominated the middle of the pitch initially but, like his team, he could not sustain the challenge. Ciarán Whelan, operating between midfield and centre forward where he was named to start, saw a thundering shot rebound off the crossbar as the sides were level at the interval. In contrast there was a touch of good fortune about Kerry’s goal with Colm Cooper’s half-blocked shot coming back off an upright to the unmarked Dara Ó Cinnéide, who goaled on 47 minutes. Kerry went on to dominate the rest of the match and secured a 1-15 to 1-8 victory.

The All-Ireland semi-final meeting Dublin and Kerry on 26 August 2007 is regarded as a classic in its own right. Within four minutes Dublin trailed by three points, however, Kerry lost Darragh Ó Sé to injury after twenty minutes. Dublin led by 0-8 to 0-7 at the interval, however, within eight minutes of the restart they had shipped 1-3. Kerry made the match-winning break just after the interval when man-of-the-match and team captain Declan O'Sullivan’s goal was followed by a string of points which put them 1-12 to 0-9 ahead after 49 minutes. Dublin fought back, outscoring Kerry by seven points to two in a 17-minute spell but a number of unforced errors and a late point by O’Sullivan ensured the Kingdom’s progress on a score line of 1-15 to 0-16.

On 3 August 2009, Dublin faced Kerry in an eagerly-anticipated All-Ireland quarter-final, however, the game ended in a demolition of Dublin. Colm Cooper’s goal after just 40 seconds set the tone for Kerry supremacy. That score launched the Kingdom into a compelling, enthralling exhibition of controlled football that simply blew their opponents away and they led by 1-14 to 0-3 at the break, with Gooch hitting 1-4 and skipper Darran O'Sullivan three points. Conal Keaney netted a Dublin goal on 56 minutes, but Kerry responded with the last five points of the game to win by a massive 17 points margin, Cooper finishing with a 1-7 tally in a 1-24 to 1-7 rout.

=== 2011-present: Dublin dominance ===
A free kick to win the All-Ireland...Stephen Cluxton...in
his 55th championship match...15 points in his career
so far, he's already got one today...the distance with
the angle about 45 metres, here he comes to win the
All-Ireland...Cluxton...he's put it over the bar...and Dublin
are in front by 1-12 to 1-11...Cluxton the hero.

— RTÉ's Ger Canning describes the last moments of the
2011 All-Ireland final.

On 18 September 2011, Dublin and Kerry faced off in their first All-Ireland final meeting in 26 years. Declan O'Sullivan’s early fisted point was Kerry’s only score of the opening 18 minutes, while it took Dublin ten minutes to get their opening score from Alan Brogan. Kerry struck for a goal in the 19th minute when Darran O'Sullivan sliced through the Dublin defence, off-loaded to Colm Cooper, and the Kerry skipper beat Stephen Cluxton. Kieran Donaghy, having moved to full-forward after starting at midfield, was later denied a second goal for Kerry. Dublin pushed ahead with two Bernard Brogan efforts, as Kerry were held scoreless for 15 minutes until Paul Galvin - in as a sub after 24 minutes - found the target. Dublin led by 0-6 to 1-2 at the end of a low-scoring first half, and surged further ahead with points from Bernard Brogan and Denis Bastick. Kerry’s vast experience began to tell in the second half, and they eased into a four-point lead with seven minutes to play. But the game took a sensational twist in the 64th minute when Dublin dragged themselves back into it with a superb goal. Alan Brogan made the break, off-loaded to Kevin McManamon, and the substitute skipped past Declan O’Sullivan and fired low past Brendan Kealy. The sides were level for a fifth time a minute later when wing-back Kevin Nolan split the posts from distance. And in a gripping finish, Cluxton kept his cool to make history as the first goalkeeper to score an All-Ireland final winner, when he slotted over a stoppage time free to seal a 1-12 to 1-11 victory.

The championship draw pitted Dublin against Kerry in the All-Ireland semi-final on 1 September 2013. Michael Darragh Macauley and Bernard Brogan struck early for the Dubs, but they were knocked back by James O'Donoghue’s seventh-minute goal. Donnchadh Walsh fired in a second goal four minutes later from a Darran O'Sullivan assist. 60 seconds later Diarmuid Connolly floated in a tantalising delivery from the left, and a flying Paul Mannion rose to punch to the net past a helpless Brendan Kealy. Dublin conceded a third goal in the 20th minute when Stephen Cluxton hauled down Walsh, and O’Donoghue drilled home the penalty for a three points advantage. Both sides exchanged several points as Kerry held a 3-5 to 1-9 half-time advantage. Having conceded five points in a row, Kerry regained their composure. Twice they went level through Colm Cooper and O’Donoghue, before Darran O’Sullivan steered over the lead point from a tight angle in the 63rd minute. But there was another fascinating twist in this memorable encounter, as Dublin cut loose with a devastating 2-2 salvo in the closing stages. Kevin McManamon plundered possession 50 metres out to drive through and plant the perfect shot past Kealy, and in stoppage time Eoghan O'Gara’s drive smashed against the crossbar and over the line for a 3-18 to 3-11 victory.

On 20 September 2015, Dublin faced Kerry in the All-Ireland final for the 13th time. The five-in-a-row Leinster champions were attack-minded from the off and opened up a two-point lead. Wet conditions conspired against a quality game and with 20 minutes on the clock it was poised at 0-3 apiece. Dublin found their best form after this and took over with a series of scores, including points from defenders Jack McCaffrey and Philly McMahon. Paddy Andrews also got on the score sheet after shrugging off Fionn Fitzgerald to give Dublin a deserved 0-8 to 0-4 double-scores advantage. Kerry were guilty of wasting their own great goal chance late on as substitute Kieran Donaghy fed Killian Young but the defender fumbled his catch close to goal, allowing Dublin to regroup and block the goal threat. From their next attack Dublin substitute Alan Brogan kicked a point that proved to be their insurance score. Kerry rallied late on and Donaghy did his best under the high ball to pinch a crucial goal, but the best they could muster in the closing stages was a converted free from Bryan Sheehan as Dublin ran out 0-12 to 0-9 winners.

Dublin faced Kerry again the following year this time at the semi-final stage. Dublin went into the game as favourites and a strong start by them led to the leading by 0-9 to 0-4 after 24 minutes. Kerry rallied before half-time and scored 2-4 with reply to go in 5 points up at half time with the goals being scored by Paul Geaney and Darran O'Sullivan. Dublin started the second half strongly and were level by the 51st minute. Kerry regained composure to retake the lead only to be pegged back by Dublin again. With the match approaching injuring time, the sides were level at 0-20 to 2-14 until two late points for Dublin courtesy of Eoghan O'Gara and Diarmuid Connolly ensured a Dublin victory with the final scoreline being Dublin 0-22 Kerry 2-14. The match was regarded as another Dublin-Kerry classic and drew comparisons to previous classic semi-finals between the two counties such as in 1977 and 2013. The match also proved to be Kerry legend Colm Cooper's last championship appearance for Kerry.

== Statistics ==
Titles won by each. Up to date as of 2026 provincial finals.

Team	All-Ireland	Provincial	National League	Total
Dublin	31	63	14	108
Kerry	39	87	24	150
Combined	70	150	38	258

Head to head matches.

Team	Win	Draw	Loss
Kerry	19	3	12
Dublin	12	3	19

== All-time results ==
=== Legend ===
Dublin win
Kerry win
Match was a draw

=== Senior ===
No.	Date	Winners	Score	Runners-up	Venue	Stage
1.	26 March 1893	Dublin	1-4 - 0-3	Kerry	Clonturk Park	All-Ireland final
2.	1 July 1906	Kerry	0-5 - 0-2	Dublin	Cork Athletic Grounds	All-Ireland final
3.	9 May 1909	Dublin	0-10 - 0-3	Kerry	Thurles Sportsfield	All-Ireland home final
4.	28 September 1924	Dublin	1-5 - 1-3	Kerry	Tuam Stadium	All-Ireland final
5.	16 April 1925	Kerry	0-4 - 0-3	Dublin	Croke Park	All-Ireland final
6.	21 August 1932	Kerry	1-3 - 1-1	Dublin	Croke Park	All-Ireland semi-final
7.	9 September 1934	Dublin	3-8 - 0-6	Kerry	Tuam Stadium	All-Ireland semi-final
8.	10 August 1941	Dublin	0-4 - 0-4	Kerry	Croke Park	All-Ireland semi-final
9.	17 August 1941	Kerry	2-9 - 0-3	Dublin	Tralee	All-Ireland semi-final replay
10.	25 September 1955	Kerry	0-12 - 1-6	Dublin	Croke Park	All-Ireland final
11.	16 August 1959	Kerry	1-10 - 2-5	Dublin	Croke Park	All-Ireland semi-final
12.	5 August 1962	Kerry	2-12 - 0-10	Dublin	Croke Park	All-Ireland semi-final
13.	8 August 1965	Kerry	4-8 - 2-6	Dublin	Croke Park	All-Ireland semi-final
14.	28 September 1975	Kerry	2-12 - 0-11	Dublin	Croke Park	All-Ireland final
15.	26 September 1976	Dublin	3-8 - 0-10	Kerry	Croke Park	All-Ireland final
16.	21 August 1977	Dublin	3-12 - 1-13	Kerry	Croke Park	All-Ireland semi-final
17.	24 September 1978	Kerry	5-11 - 0-9	Dublin	Croke Park	All-Ireland final
18.	16 September 1979	Kerry	3-13 - 1-8	Dublin	Croke Park	All-Ireland final
19.	23 September 1984	Kerry	0-14 - 1-6	Dublin	Croke Park	All-Ireland final
20.	22 September 1985	Kerry	2-12 - 2-8	Dublin	Croke Park	All-Ireland final
21.	4 August 2001	Kerry	1-14 - 2-11	Dublin	Semple Stadium	All-Ireland quarter-final
22.	11 August 2001	Kerry	2-12 - 1-12	Dublin	Semple Stadium	All-Ireland quarter-final replay
23.	14 August 2004	Kerry	1-15 - 1-8	Dublin	Croke Park	All-Ireland quarter-final
24.	26 August 2007	Kerry	1-15 - 0-16	Dublin	Croke Park	All-Ireland semi-final
25.	3 August 2009	Kerry	1-24 - 1-7	Dublin	Croke Park	All-Ireland quarter-final
26.	18 September 2011	Dublin	1-12 - 1-11	Kerry	Croke Park	All-Ireland final
27.	1 September 2013	Dublin	3-18 - 3-11	Kerry	Croke Park	All-Ireland semi-final
28.	20 September 2015	Dublin	0-12 - 0-9	Kerry	Croke Park	All-Ireland final
29.	28 August 2016	Dublin	0-22 - 2-14	Kerry	Croke Park	All-Ireland semi-final
30.	1 September 2019	Dublin	1-16 - 1-16	Kerry	Croke Park	All-Ireland final
31.	14 September 2019	Dublin	1-18 - 0-15	Kerry	Croke Park	All-Ireland final replay
32.	10 July 2022	Kerry	1-14 - 1-13	Dublin	Croke Park	All-Ireland semi-final
33.	30 July 2023	Dublin	1-15 - 1-13	Kerry	Croke Park	All-Ireland final
34.	12 July 2026	Kerry	2-18 - 0-20	Dublin	Croke Park	All-Ireland semi-final

== Records ==
=== Scorelines ===
- Biggest championship winning margin:
  - For Dublin: 11 points, Dublin 3-8 - 0-6 Kerry, All-Ireland semi-final, Tuam Stadium, 9 September 1934
  - For Kerry: 17 points, Kerry 5-11 - 0-9 Dublin, All-Ireland final, Croke Park, 24 September 1978
- Highest aggregate:
  - Dublin 3-18 - 3-11 Kerry (47 points total), All-Ireland semi-final, Croke Park, 1 September 2013

=== Top scorers ===
Team	Player	Score	Total
Dublin	Dean Rock	0-29	29
Kerry	Mikey Sheehy	3-27	36

- Top scorer in a single game:
  - For Kerry: 2-6
    - Mikey Sheehy, Kerry 3-13 - 1-8 Dublin, All-Ireland Final, Croke Park, 16 September 1979
  - For Dublin: 0-12
    - Dean Rock, Dublin 0-22 - 2-14 Kerry, All-Ireland Semi-Final, Croke Park, 28 August 2016

=== Attendance ===
- Highest attendance:
  - 87,102 - Kerry 0-12 - 1-6 Dublin, All-Ireland final, Croke Park, 25 September 1955
