= George Charlemont =

Irish Gaelic footballer

Personal information
- Native name: Seoirse Charlemont (Irish)
- Born: 16 September 1873 Enniskerry, County Wicklow, Ireland
- Died: 13 August 1907 (aged 33) Stoneybatter, Dublin, Ireland
- Occupation: Clerk

Sport
- Sport: Gaelic football
- Position: Goalkeeper
Club
- Years: Club
- Young Irelands
Club titles
- Dublin titles: 5
Inter-county
- Years: County
- 1891–1894: Dublin
Inter-county titles
- Leinster titles: 3
- All-Irelands: 3

George Charlemont (16 September 1873 – 13 August 1907) was an Irish Gaelic footballer. His championship career with the Dublin senior team lasted four seasons from 1891 until 1894.

Born in Enniskerry, County Wicklow, Charlemont was born to George and Mary Charlemont (née Kearney). He was educated locally before finding employment in Dublin as a timekeeper and clerk.

Charlemont first played competitive football with the Young Irelands club. He won five county senior championship medals with the club between 1891 and 1896.

Young Irelands represented Dublin in the championship, with Charlemont making his inter-county debut during the 1891 championship. As the regular goalkeeper over the following four seasons, he won three All-Ireland medals during that time – the first goalkeeper to reach that milestone. Charlemont also won three Leinster medals.

Charlemont died from tuberculosis on 13 August 1907.

== Honours ==
Young Irelands

- Dublin Senior Football Championship (5): 1891, 1892, 1893, 1894, 1896

Dublin

- All-Ireland Senior Football Championship (3): 1891, 1892, 1894
- Leinster Senior Football Championship (3): 1891, 1892, 1894
