= 1994 All-Ireland Minor Football Championship =

Gaelic football competition

Championship details

All-Ireland Champions
- Winning team: Kerry (11th win)
- Captain: Jack Ferriter
- Manager: Charlie Nelligan

All-Ireland Finalists
- Losing team: Galway

Provincial Champions
- Munster: Kerry
- Leinster: Dublin
- Ulster: Armagh
- Connacht: Galway

The 1994 All-Ireland Minor Football Championship was the 63rd staging of the All-Ireland Minor Football Championship, the Gaelic Athletic Association's premier inter-county Gaelic football tournament for boys under the age of 18.

Cork entered the championship as defending champions, however, they were defeated by Kerry in the Munster semi-final.

On 18 September 1994, Kerry won the championship following a 0-16 to 1-7 defeat of Galway in the All-Ireland final. This was their 11th All-Ireland title and their first title in six championship seasons.

== Results ==
=== Leinster Minor Football Championship ===
First Round

30 April 1994 First round	Offaly	2-09 - 0-05	Wicklow	Aughrim, Wicklow

30 April 1994 First round	Westmeath	2-14 - 2-05	Louth	Castletown-Geoghegan, Westmeath

30 April 1994 First round	Dublin	0-19 - 0-07	Kilkenny	Kilkenny, Kilkenny

30 April 1994 First round	Laois	0-11 - 1-08	Longford	Portlaoise, Laois

7 May 1994 First round replay	Laois	3-05 - 2-04	Longford	Longford, Longford

Second Round

14 May 1994 Second round	Wexford	1-12 - 3-03	Offaly	Wexford, Wexford

14 May 1994 Second round	Dublin	2-11 - 1-07	Kildare	Newbridge, Kildare

14 May 1994 Second round	Carlow	1-13 - 0-15	Westmeath	Carlow, Carlow

14 May 1994 Second round	Meath	1-08 - 0-10	Laois	Portlaoise, Laois

Semi-Finals

3 July 1994 Semi-Final	Wexford	2-08 - 2-08	Meath	Croke Park, Dublin

10 July 1994 Semi-Final	Dublin	1-19 - 0-05	Carlow	Croke Park, Dublin

17 July 1994 Semi-Final Replay	Wexford	3-06 - 3-05	Meath	Croke Park, Dublin

Final

31 July 1994 Final	Dublin	2-12 - 2-06	Wexford	Croke Park, Dublin

=== Connacht Minor Football Championship ===
First Round

21 May 1994 First round	Roscommon	3-07 - 0-09	Leitrim	Carrick-on-Shannon, Leitrim

Semi-Final

26 June 1994 Semi-Final	Mayo	1-08 - 0-09	Sligo	Castlebar, County Mayo

3 July 1994 Semi-Final	Galway	2-09 - 1-10	Roscommon	Carrick-on-Shannon, Leitrim

Final

24 July 1994 Final	Galway	2-11 - 0-09	Mayo	Hyde Park, Roscommon

=== Munster Minor Football Championship ===
==== First round ====
6 May 1994 First round	Kerry	1-24 - 1-06	Limerick	Askeaton, County Limerick

11 May 1994 First round	Waterford	1-07 - 0-06	Tipperary	Stradbally, County Laois

==== Semi-final ====
14 July 1994 Semi-Final	Kerry	3-14 - 2-07	Cork	Páirc Uí Chaoimh, Cork

15 July 1994 Semi-Final	Clare	2-07 - 1-07	Waterford	Ennis, County Clare

==== Final ====
24 July 1994 Final	Kerry	2-11 - 3-05	Clare	Páirc Uí Chaoimh, Cork

=== Ulster Minor Football Championship ===
==== First round ====
15 May 1994 First round	Armagh	1-08 - 1-05	Fermanagh	Armagh, County Armagh

22 May 1994 First round	Monaghan	1-08 - 0-10	Cavan	Breffni Park, County Cavan

29 May 1994 First round	Down	2-10 - 0-09	Derry	Celtic Park, Derry

5 June 1994 First round	Donegal	1-14 - 0-07	Antrim	Casement Park, Belfast

==== Second round ====
12 June 1994 Second round	Tyrone	0-10 - 0-10	Armagh	Omagh, County Tyrone

==== Second round replay ====
19 June 1994 Second round replay	Armagh	1-08 - 0-10	Tyrone	Armagh, County Armagh

==== Semi-final ====
26 June 1994 Semi-Final	Armagh	1-15 - 0-08	Donegal	Breffni Park, County Cavan

3 July 1994 Semi-Final	Down	3-09 - 0-15	Monaghan	Casement Park, Belfast

==== Final ====
17 July 1994 Final	Armagh	3-13 - 1-07	Down	Clones, County Monaghan

=== All-Ireland Minor Football Championship ===
Semi-Finals

14 August 1994 Semi-Final	Kerry	2-10 - 0-09	Armagh	Croke Park, Dublin

21 August 1994 Semi Final	Galway	1-12 - 0-12	Dublin	Croke Park, Dublin

Final

18 September 1994 Final	Kerry	0-16 - 1-07	Galway	Croke Park, Dublin
