= John Kennedy (Dublin Gaelic footballer) =

Irish Gaelic footballer

Personal information
- Native name: Seán Ó Cinnéide (Irish)

Sport
- Sport: Gaelic football
Club
- Years: Club
- Young Irelands
Club titles
- Dublin titles: 4
Inter-county
- Years: County
- 1891-1984: Dublin
Inter-county titles
- Leinster titles: 3
- All-Irelands: 3

John Kennedy was an Irish Gaelic footballer. His championship career at senior level with the Dublin county team lasted four seasons from 1891 until 1894.

Kennedy first played competitive football with the Young Irelands club. He won four successive county senior championship medals with the club between 1891 and 1894.

Young Irelands represented Dublin in the championship, with Kennedy making his inter-county debut during the 1891 championship. As captain of the team over the following four seasons, he won three All-Ireland medals during that time - the first player to captain a team to three championships. Kennedy also won three Leinster medals.

== Honours ==
Young Irelands

- Dublin Senior Football Championship (4): 1891, 1892, 1893, 1894

Dublin

- All-Ireland Senior Football Championship (3): 1891 (c), 1892 (c), 1894 (c)
- Leinster Senior Football Championship (3): 1891 (c), 1892 (c), 1894 (c)

Sporting positions
Preceded by	Dublin Senior Football Captain; 1891-1894	Succeeded by
Achievements
Preceded by Jim Power	All-Ireland Senior Football Final winning captain 1891-1892	Succeeded by Tom Hayes
Preceded by Tom Hayes	All-Ireland Senior Football Final winning captain 1894	Succeeded by Paddy Finn
