= Ronan Carolan =

Cavan Gaelic footballer

Personal information
- Born: County Cavan, Ireland
- Occupation: Physiotherapist

Sport
- Sport: Gaelic football
- Position: Half forward
Club
- Years: Club
- Cuchulainns
Inter-county
| Years | County | Apps (scores) |
| 1986–1998 | Cavan | 2–138 (144 pts) |
Inter-county titles
- Ulster titles: 1 & 1 (U-21)
- NFL: 1 (Div.2)

Ronan Carolan is a former Gaelic footballer who played for the Cavan county team.

== Playing career ==
Carolan was a prolific freetaker for Cavan. He helped Cavan reach the All-Ireland Under 21 Football Championship final in 1988, but they were defeated by Offaly. In 1989, Cavan had a great run in the National Football League claiming the Div. 2 title and reaching the semi-final, only to lose narrowly to Dublin in Croke Park. In the same year he won a Dr McKenna Cup medal when Cavan defeated Derry in the Final. He was a member of the Cavan squad that lost in the Ulster Final in 1996. But, in 1997, Carolan scored 10 points to help Cavan claim their only Ulster Senior Football Championship title in 28 years, beating Derry in Clones.

Carolan is 10th in the top all-time Ulster marksman, scoring 2–138 (144 pts).

Carolan is his county's top scorer in National Football League history, finishing his career with 19–387 (444) in that competition.
