= 1891 All-Ireland Senior Football Championship =

Football championship

All-Ireland Champions
- Winning team: Dublin (1st win)
- Captain: John Kennedy

All-Ireland Finalists
- Losing team: Cork

Provincial Champions
- Munster: Cork
- Leinster: Dublin
- Ulster: Cavan
- Connacht: Not played

Championship statistics

The 1891 All-Ireland Senior Football Championship was the fifth staging of Ireland's premier Gaelic football knock-out competition. Dublin were the champions ending Cork's spell.

== Representative clubs ==
From 1887 until 1891 the club champions represented the whole county.

County	Club
Armagh	
Cavan	Cavan Slashers
Cork	Clondrohid
Dublin	Young Irelands
Kerry	Ballymacelligott
Kildare	Mountrice Blunts
Waterford	

== Results ==
=== Connacht ===
There were no entrants from Connacht.

=== Munster ===
1891
Semi-Final

Limerick	0–0 – 0–0	Waterford

20 September 1891
Semi-Final

Cork	2–5 – 0–2	Kerry

Killarney

1 November 1891
Final

Cork	1–5 – 0–4	Waterford

Youghal

=== Leinster ===
1891
Semi Final

Dublin	4–11 – 0–0	Wicklow

Clonturk

8 November 1891
Semi Final

Kildare	0–5 – 0–0	Laois

Clonturk
Referee: A Murphy (Dublin)

8 November 1891
Final

Dublin	w/o – scr.	Kildare

Clonturk

=== Ulster ===
18 October 1891
Semi-final

Cavan	3–9 – 0–0	Antrim

Armagh
Referee: James Lennon

1 November 1891
Final

Cavan	0–7 – 0–1	Armagh

Bailieboro
Referee: Connolly

Game was replayed due to an objection.

6 December 1891
Final Replay

Cavan	1–11 – 0–0	Armagh

Smithborough

=== Semi-final ===
28 February 1892
Semi-Final

Dublin	3–7 – 0–3	Cavan

Clonturk Park, Drumcondra
Referee: Patrick Larkin (Galway)

=== Final ===
28 February 1892

Dublin	2–1 – 1–1	Cork

Clonturk Park, Drumcondra
Referee: T.J. Whelan (Laois)

== Statistics ==
- Dublin win both their first Leinster and All-Ireland titles.
- Cavan win their first Ulster title.
- Dublin played the All-Ireland semi-final and the All-Ireland final on the same day. The 1891 All-Ireland Senior Hurling Championship final between Kerry and Wexford was played between the two football matches.

== Roll of Honour ==
- Limerick – 1 (1887)
- Tipperary – 1 (1889)
- Cork – 1 (1890)
- Dublin – 1 (1891)
