= 1892 All-Ireland Senior Football Championship =

Football championship

All-Ireland Champions
- Winning team: Dublin (2nd win)
- Captain: John Kennedy

All-Ireland Finalists
- Losing team: Kerry

Provincial Champions
- Munster: Kerry
- Leinster: Dublin
- Ulster: Not played
- Connacht: Roscommon

Championship statistics

The 1892 All-Ireland Senior Football Championship was the sixth staging of Ireland's premier Gaelic football knock-out competition. Dublin were the champions, becoming the first county to retain the title.

This was the first championship in which players from any part of a county (rather than just the county champions) could play on the county team. Other important rule changes were also introduced: the goal was made worth 5 points (previously, a goal was worth more than any number of points) and teams were reduced from 21-a-side to 17.

== Results ==
=== Connacht ===
Roscommon were the only entrant, so they received a bye to the All-Ireland semi-final.

=== Leinster ===
12 March 1893
Semi-Final

Dublin	3–5 – 0–1	Kildare

Clonturk
Referee: JP Kavanagh

12 March 1893
Final

Dublin	w/o – scr.	Louth

Clonturk
Referee: JP Cox

=== Munster ===
30 October 1892
Semi-Final

Kerry	3–6 – 0–5	Cork

Killarney

4 December 1892
Final

Kerry	1–6 – 0–3	Waterford

Fermoy

=== Ulster ===
There were no entrants from Ulster.

=== Semi-final ===
19 March 1893
Semi-Final

Dublin	1–9 – 1–1	Roscommon

Clonturk Park, Drumcondra

=== Final ===
26 March 1893

Dublin	1–4 – 0–3	Kerry

Clonturk Park, Drumcondra
Attendance: 5,000
Referee: Dan Fraher (Waterford)

== Statistics ==
- Dublin become the first county to win the All-Ireland title for a second year in a row.
