= 1894 All-Ireland Senior Football Championship =

Football championship

All-Ireland Champions
- Winning team: Dublin (3rd win)
- Captain: John Kennedy

All-Ireland Finalists
- Losing team: Cork

Provincial Champions
- Munster: Cork
- Leinster: Dublin
- Ulster: Not played
- Connacht: Not played

Championship statistics

The 1894 All-Ireland Senior Football Championship was the eighth staging of Ireland's premier Gaelic football knock-out competition. Dublin were the champions in the first replayed final. In the Leinster semi final they ended Wexford's All Ireland title defence.

== Results ==
=== Leinster ===
29 September 1895
Quarter-Final

Kildare	1–4 – 0–4	Wexford

Clonturk Park, Drumcondra

10 November 1895
Quarter-Final

Louth	0–2 – 2–10	Kildare

Clonturk Park, Drumcondra

9 September 1894
Semi-Final

Meath	1–6 – 0–0	Kilkenny

Phoenix Park

1894
Semi-Final

Dublin	1–10 – 0–0	Wexford

Clonturk Park, Drumcondra

14 October 1894
Final

Dublin	0–4 – 0–4	Meath

Clonturk Park, Drumcondra

15 December 1894
Final Replay

Dublin	0–2 – 0–2 A.E.T.	Meath

Navan

24 February 1895
Final, Second Replay

Dublin	1–8 – 1–2	Meath

Clonturk Park, Drumcondra

=== Munster ===
19 August 1894
Semi-Final

Tipperary	0–2 – 0–4	Kerry

Cork Park

Tipperary objected – this was upheld.

30 September 1894
Semi-Final Replay

Tipperary	w/o – scr.	Kerry

Mallow

16 September 1894
Semi-Final

Cork	3–5 – 0–0	Limerick

Cork Park

2 December 1894
Final

Cork	0–6 – 0–2	Tipperary

Limerick
Referee: Mr Trownsell, Limerick

Tipperary objected – this was upheld.

3 March 1895
Final Replay

Cork	2–4 – 0–1	Tipperary

Charleville

=== Final ===
24 March 1895

Dublin	1–1 – 0–6	Cork

Clonturk Park, Drumcondra
Referee: R.T. Blake (Meath)

21 April 1895
Replay

Dublin	0–5 – 1–2	Cork

Clonturk Park, Drumcondra
Attendance: 10,000
Referee: R.T. Blake (Meath)

Note that, at the time, a goal was worth five points, so the first game was a draw: 6 points each. Cork led the replay 7 points to 5 when the Dublin team walked off the field after Cork supporters assaulted their players. As Cork were deemed responsible for the incident, Dublin were awarded the title.

== Statistics ==
- Dublin awarded the points to become All-Ireland champions.
