= Dublin county football team =

Gaelic football team

Dublin
- Sport: Football
- Irish: Áth Cliath
- Nickname(s): The Dubs; The Jacks; The Capital men The Boys in Blue; The Liffeysiders; The Metropolitans
- County board: Dublin GAA
- Manager: Ger Brennan
- Captain: Con O'Callaghan (2025)
- Most appearances: Stephen Cluxton (?)
- Top scorer: Dean Rock (?–?)
- Home venue(s): Parnell Park, Dublin; Croke Park, Dublin

Recent competitive record
- Current All-Ireland status: SF in 2026
- Last championship title: 2023
- Current NFL Division: 1 (7th in 2026); relegated to Division 2
- Last league title: 2021
First colours	Second colours

The Dublin county football team represents Dublin in men's Gaelic football and is governed by Dublin GAA, a county board of the Gaelic Athletic Association. It competes in the three major annual inter-county competitions: the All-Ireland Senior Football Championship, Leinster Senior Football Championship and National Football League.

The team's history is defined by three golden eras. They dominated the All-Ireland SFC's early years, winning eleven titles between 1891 and 1908. The mid-1970s to early 1980s was another successful period, with Kevin Heffernan and Tony Hanahoe overseeing four more championships. Jim Gavin’s tenure (2012–2019) produced six All-Ireland titles, including five-in-a-row from 2015 to 2019. He is Dublin's most successful manager and widely regarded as one of the sport's greatest-ever managers. Gavin left after 2019, but Dublin extended the streak to a record sixth consecutive title in 2020—the longest such run in either Gaelic football or hurling.

Dublin is the second most-successful team in the All-Ireland SFC, with their 31 titles trailing Kerry's 39. The sides are considered Gaelic football's "big two", and their long-standing rivalry is one of the sport's most renowned. They also had a long-standing and fierce rivalry with Meath, one of their geographic neighbors in Leinster. Dublin and Meath rank first and second in Leinster Senior Championships won, respectively.

Although Dublin's official home ground is Parnell Park in Donnycarney, home games are generally played at Croke Park. The team's manager is Ger Brennan. The team last won the Leinster Senior Championship in 2024, the All-Ireland Senior Championship in 2023 and the National League in 2021.

== History ==
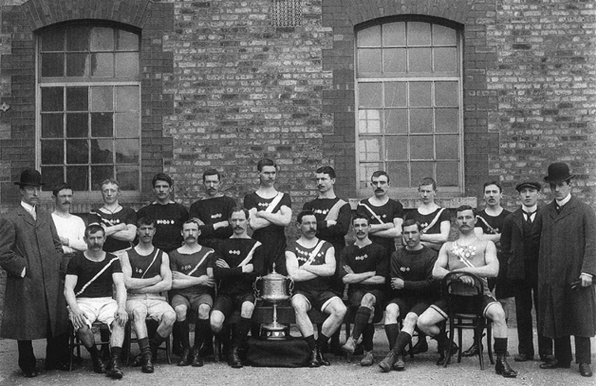
1899 Dublin team that won the All-Ireland championship

Wexford defeated Dublin in the final of the 1890 Leinster Senior Football Championship (SFC). Dublin won its first Leinster SFC the following year by defeating Kildare in the final, and followed up by winning its first All-Ireland Senior Football Championship (SFC) by defeating Cork by a scoreline of 2–1 to 1–1 in the 1891 All-Ireland Senior Football Championship Final. Dublin retained the Leinster SFC in 1892, defeating Louth in the final and then retained the All-Ireland SFC with victory over Kerry by a scoreline of 1–4 to 0–3 in the 1892 All-Ireland Senior Football Championship Final.

=== Heffernan and Hanahoe: 1974–1986 ===
"In '73, a Dublin footballer had no profile whatsoever. We were regularly beaten in the first round of the Leinster Championship... Dublin didn't really train in those days. We prepared for one championship match, were usually beaten by Laois or Longford and then had the summer off... But then when (Kevin) Heffernan came back into it in '74, it was a different ball game... Much more rigorous in terms of tolerating any drinking or messing".

— David Hickey on the difference in Dublin before Heffernan and after Heffernan.

After winning the 1963 All-Ireland final, Dublin's football team fell into a period of abject irrelevance, with a Leinster championship win in 1965 the only success they would see for the remainder of the decade. A frustrated board turned to former captain Kevin Heffernan ahead of the 1974 inter-county season to try and revive their fortunes, entrusting him and his assistants with complete control over team construction in an era where other counties would decide the panel by committee.

Heffernan had a reputation as a maverick: as a player in the 1950s was derided as a "soccerite" for encouraging a style focused on quick passing and interplay, off the park he ignored the episcopal ban on Catholics attending Trinity College Dublin to gain a degree there while establishing the university's GAA club, and openly cited soccer manager Don Revie as an influence. His appointment could not have come at a more opportune time. The post-World War II baby boom, growth of newly-built suburbs, and increased migration to Dublin meant that a surfeit of young talent was at his disposal. Many came from Heffernan's own club, St Vincents in the northern suburb of Marino, which would dominate the local club scene at the same time Dublin were making their mark nationally. This newly-built team, playing a rapid, exciting brand of football, did not take long to find success, winning the 1974 All-Ireland Senior Football Championship final over Galway thanks to goalkeeper Paddy Cullen stopping a penalty and talismanic forward Jimmy Keaveney, whom Heffernan had convinced to come out of inter-county retirement, kicking critical scores.

Dublin's win was arguably more importantly felt off the park than it was on it. During the late 1960s and early 1970s the city's sporting public were starved for success: Gaelic sports were uncompetitive, many of the local League of Ireland sides had fallen on hard times, and Leinster Rugby were little better. Couple that with the arrival of colour television, where viewers could watch Match of the Day or The Big Match via reception from across the Irish Sea, and the result was more people in the capital following the fortunes of Liverpool or Manchester United, Celtic or Arsenal, than domestic sport. The arrival of a dynamic, successful team that most importantly was from and represented Dublin captivated the city and led to an explosion of interest in Gaelic football from all corners of society. Younger fans brought the terrace culture they had observed from British soccer, with its creative banners, scarves, and songs, to Croke Park; a single released to support the Dublin team said in its chorus "Hill 16 has never seen the likes of Heffo's Army", as supporters nicknamed themselves. Indeed many of the more conservative GAA support from elsewhere were stunned by the style and numbers of fans that came out to support the Dubs home and away.

The Dublin team of this era won four All-Ireland SFCs (1974, 1976, 1977 and 1983) and seven Leinster Senior Football Championship (SFC) titles (six of which were consecutive). It was also the first team to play in six straight All-Ireland SFC finals (from 1974 to 1979), which would not be matched until 2009. Four of those six finals came against Kerry, establishing a fierce rivalry that came with all the hallmarks of great sporting clashes: tradition against modernity, rural versus urban, power versus pace. Heffernan briefly retired after the 1976 championship win over the Kingdom, which carried extra emotional weight as his first All-Ireland final appearance as a player ended in defeat to Kerry. He handed off the team to longtime captain Tony Hanahoe, who won the 1977 championship as a player-manager, only to return in 1979 and later claim his third All-Ireland as a manager in the infamous 1983 final. Fittingly played against Galway, the match saw three Dublin players sent off and a shorthanded team (nicknamed the "Twelve Apostles" or the "Dirty Dozen") hang on to claim the Sam Maguire and put a coda on a defining era of Dublin football.

In January 1986, Heffernan retired as Dublin manager, this time for good.

=== Post-Heffernan years: 1986–2008 ===
Dublin and Meath were involved in one of the most famous of Leinster SFC encounters in 1991, the Dublin and Meath four-parter. The teams had to go to three replays in their Leinster SFC first round match before a winner could be found. This series of games had the added factor of Dublin and Meath being long-time fierce rivals, a rivalry that intensified when Meath won four from the previous five Leinster SFCs and two All-Ireland SFCs over the previous five years, to replace Dublin as the strongest team in the province of Leinster. Meath eventually won the series, thanks to a last-minute goal scored by Kevin Foley, and a point scored by David Beggy, in the third replay. Foley took seven steps for the winning goal,just as Kevin McManamon took 13 for the Dublin goal aginst Kerry in the 2011 final.

Dublin qualified for the 1992 All-Ireland Senior Football Championship Final by defeating surprise Munster champions Clare in the All-Ireland SFC semi-final. However, the county was surprised itself in the final to be defeated unexpectedly by Donegal.

Dublin qualified for the 1994 All-Ireland Senior Football Championship Final by defeating surprise Connacht champions Leitrim in the All-Ireland SFC semi-final. However, the county lost to Down in the final on this occasion. The following year, Dublin won the 1995 All-Ireland Senior Football Championship final, defeating Tyrone by a single point.

=== Gilroy, Gavin, Farrell: 2008–present ===
In the 2010s, Dublin produced the greatest teams in modern times. The Dubs won seven All-Ireland SFCs in this decade (five of which were consecutive, the first team to achieve this feat). Six of these were won without defeat (with the exception of one loss to Jim McGuinness's Donegal in the 2014 All-Ireland semi-final). Dublin limited Cork, Donegal and Kerry to a single All-Ireland SFC each during that decade.

Pat Gilroy led Dublin to the first of these All-Ireland SFCs in 2011.

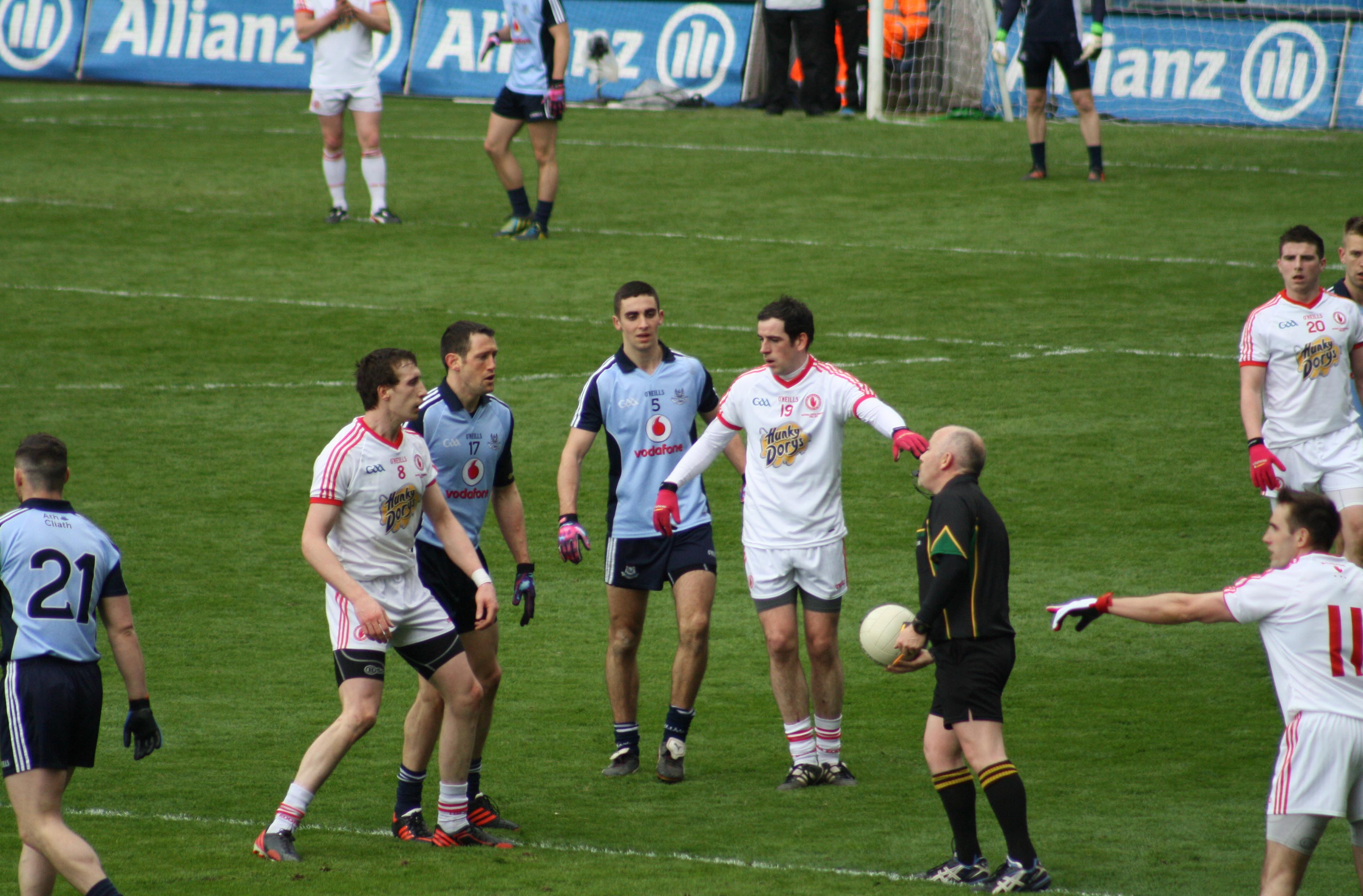
Dublin against Tyrone in the 2013 National Football League final

Jim Gavin led Dublin to the next six from 2013, including the five-in-a-row from 2015 onwards.

He introduced new players to the team each year, starting with Paul Mannion and Jack McCaffrey in 2013, continuing with Cormac Costello and Nicky Devereaux in 2014, followed by Brian Fenton and John Small in 2015 and Davy Byrne in 2016.

On 25 March 2017, when beating Roscommon by 2–29 to 0–14 in a National League game at Croke Park, Dublin set a new record of playing 35 games in League and Championship without defeat. The previous record, held by Kerry, had stood for 84 years.

Jim Gavin continued to introduce new players, with Con O'Callaghan and Niall Scully appearing in 2017 and Brian Howard and Eoin Murchan emerging in 2018. But Gavin tended to wait one year from when he noticed them to introduce them to his team, O'Callaghan having been ready in 2016 and Howard in 2017.

Jim Gavin stood down as manager in 2019.

Alan Brogan noted in 2020: "The only year he didn't do it [introduce new players] was last year. Last year, [Jim Gavin] kept with the same players which, in hindsight, leads you to believe that maybe he had it in the back of his mind it would be his final year".

Dessie Farrell replaced him.

Mayo defeated Dublin in the semi-final of the 2021 All-Ireland SFC, ending a record run of six consecutive All-Ireland SFC titles for Dublin and marking the team's first championship loss since the 2014 semi-final. A year later, Dublin met the same fate when Kerry defeated Dublin in the 2022 All-Ireland SFC semi-final, Kerry's first victory against Dublin since 2009.

Dublin had earlier been relegated from Division 1 at the conclusion of the 2022 National Football League, but returned to the top flight in 2023, beating Derry in the Division 2 league final.

Galway knocked Dublin out of the 2024 All-Ireland SFC at the quarter-final stage.

Farrell stood down as manager in June 2025 immediately after a second successive All-Ireland SFC quarter-final exit, this time to Tyrone, almost a year to the day of the 2023 defeat to Galway. His replacement was Ger Brennan, who had won two All-Irelands as a player with Dublin and recently led Louth to their first Leinster SFC championship in seven decades as a manager.

== Colours and crest ==
=== Kit evolution ===
Until 1918 Dublin wore the colours of the reigning Club Champions as was also the case in many other counties. In 1918 they adopted the well-known sky blue shirt with the Dublin shield, though some of the details were different compared to the modern strip: collar and shorts were white and the socks hooped, white and blue. The team moved to navy blue shorts, socks, trim, and numbers in 1974, on the advice of a secretary at an ad agency who suggested the darker details would look better on colour television. Navy sleeves on the jersey were not used from 2013 until 2023.

1918–74	1974–80	1983 (Note: All-Ireland SFC Final)	1990s	2011	2013
2013–15	2016–18	2019–20 (Note: 2019–March 2020 suspension of play)	2020 NFL (Note: resumption–2022)	2023–

=== Team sponsorship ===
The following is a list of sponsors of the Dublin county football team (senior).

Years	Sponsor	
Years	Manufacturer	Sponsor
1880s–1990	O'Neills (1918–)	No Sponsor
1990	O'Neills (1918–)	Kaliber
1991 league games	O'Neills (1918–)	National Irish Bank
1991–2009	O'Neills (1918–)	Arnotts
2010–2013	O'Neills (1918–)	Vodafone
2014–2023	O'Neills (1918–)	AIG
2023–	O'Neills (1918–)	Staycity Aparthotels

== Management team ==
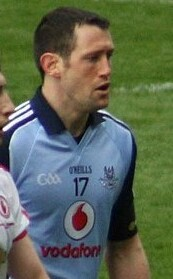
Denis Bastick

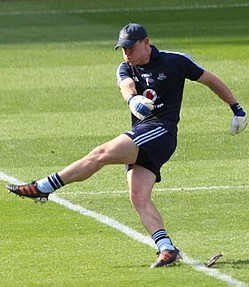
Stephen Cluxton

Members of the management team

As of September 2025:

- Manager: Ger Brennan
- Selectors: Dean Rock, Denis Bastick, Stephen Cluxton, Professor Niall Moyna

== Panel ==
Team as per Dublin vs Tyrone in the 2025 All-Ireland Senior Football Championship Quarter-Final, 28th June 2025

No.	Player	Position	Club
1	Stephen Cluxton	Goalkeeper	Parnells
2	Eoin Murchan	Right corner-back	Na Fianna
3	David Byrne	Full-back	Naomh Ólaf
4	Seán MacMahon	Left corner-back	Raheny
5	Brian Howard	Right half-back	Raheny
6	John Small	Centre-back	Ballymun Kickhams
7	Lee Gannon	Left half-back	Whitehall Colmcille
8	Peadar Ó Cofaigh-Byrne	Midfield	Cuala
9	Killian McGinnis	Midfield	Skerries Harps
10	Seán Bugler	Right half-forward	Plunketts/ER
11	Ciarán Kilkenny	Centre-forward	Castleknock
12	Niall Scully	Left half-forward	Templeogue Synge St
13	Paddy Small	Right corner-forward	Ballymun Kickhams
14	Cormac Costello	Full-forward	Whitehall Colmcille
15	Lorcan O'Dell	Left corner-forward	Templeogue Synge St

No.	Player	Position	Club
16	Evan Comerford	Goalkeeper	Ballymun Kickhams
17	Luke Breathnach	Forward	Ballinteer St John's
18	Theo Clancy	Full-back	Kilmacud Crokes
19	Nathan Doran	Back	Clontarf
20	Alex Gavin	Back	Ballyboden St Enda's
21	Tom Lahiff	Midfield	St Jude's
22	Greg McEneaney	Wing-back	Skerries Harps
23	Ross McGarry	Wing-forward	Ballyboden St Enda's
24	Cian Murphy	Wing-back	Thomas Davis
25	Con O'Callaghan (c)	Full-forward	Cuala
26	Brian O'Leary	Forward	Na Fianna

^{INJ} Player has had an injury which has affected recent involvement with the county team.
^{RET} Player has since retired from the county team.
^{WD} Player has since withdrawn from the county team due to a non-injury issue.

== Supporters ==
Dublin supporters are commonly known as The Dubs, and in the 1970s as Heffo's army. While songs are still popular with the Dublin fans they tend to be Dublin-centric, such as "Molly Malone" and "Dublin in the Rare Old Times", or focus on the team itself, singing "Come on You Boys in Blue".

The Hill 16 end in Croke Park is an area for which many Dubs hold a special affection and it is not uncommon to see the Hill filled entirely with Dubs. Dublin supporters have been known to chant "Hill 16 is Dublin only" as a humorous jibe at supporters from rival teams.

The Dublin team are sometimes called The Jacks, with the ladies called The Jackies. These names came from a shortening of the word Jackeen.

=== Rivalries ===
Dublin's biggest rivalry has been with nearby Meath. Both counties were the strongest sides from Leinster during the 1970s and 1980s. The 1991 four-game tie added to the intensity between the two counties. The Dublin football team also shares a rivalry with neighbours Kildare. Lesser local rivalries exist with nearby Wicklow, Laois and Westmeath.

On a national level Dublin's rivalry with Kerry is one of Ireland's most renowned. The rivalry between the two counties intensified in the 1970s and early 1980s. A rivalry with Mayo began in 2006 and intensified in the 2010s as the two sides consistently played in All-Ireland semi-finals and finals. Other smaller footballing rivalries have developed over the decades between Dublin and teams such as Cork, Tyrone (see Battle of Omagh), Donegal and Galway, who Dublin played in the 1983 Final known as the Game of Shame.

== Managerial history ==
Dublin — like Cork, Kerry and Tyrone — traditionally appoints managers from inside, rather than seeking a "foreign" appointment.

Kevin Heffernan 1974–76

Tony Hanahoe 1976–78

Kevin Heffernan (2) 1978–86

Brian Mullins, Robbie Kelleher & Seán Doherty 1986

Gerry McCaul 1986–90

Paddy Cullen 1990–92

Pat O'Neill 1992–95

Mickey Whelan 1995–97

Tommy Carr 1997–01

Tommy Lyons 2001–04

Paul Caffrey 2004–08

Pat Gilroy 2008–12

Jim Gavin 2012–2019

Dessie Farrell 2019–2025

Ger Brennan 2025–

== Players ==
=== Records ===
- Johnny Joyce, by scoring 5–3 against Longford in 1960, set a record for the highest individual scorer in any championship football match. Rory Gallagher of Fermanagh, with 3–9 against Monaghan in 2002, matched this record after 42 years. Cillian O'Connor's four goals (accompanied by nine points) in the 2020 All-Ireland Senior Football Championship semi-final at Croke Park broke that record after a further 18 years.
- In 1995, Brian Stynes became the second former AFL player to win the Sam Maguire Cup, following Dermot McNicholl in 1993.
- Dean Rock holds the record for the fastest goal scored in the history of All-Ireland SFC finals, after sending the ball past David Clarke directly from the throw-in of the 2020 final, breaking Kerryman Garry McMahon's record which had stood since the 1962 final.

==== Most appearances ====
Stephen Cluxton made his 112th appearance in the All-Ireland Football Championship when he captained Dublin to their six-in-a-row on 19 December 2020.

Cluxton became his county's most capped player, overtaking Johnny McDonnell's record against Meath in the National League on 17 October 2020.

==== Top scorers ====
- Dean Rock is the team's all-time record scorer, surpassing the long-time record of Jimmy Keaveney against Meath on 17 October 2020. The early goal for Rock in this National League match at Parnell Park meant Rock had scored 17–442 (493), one ahead of Keaveney's 30–402 (492). Rock achieved this in 95 appearances to Keaveney's 104.

=== Cú Chulainn Awards ===
1963: Paddy Holden, Des Foley, Mickey Whelan
1964: Paddy Holden^{2nd}
1965: Paddy Holden^{3rd}, Des Foley^{2nd}

=== Texaco Footballer of the Year ===
1963: Lar Foley
1974: Kevin Heffernan
1976: Jimmy Keaveney
1977: Jimmy Keaveney^{2nd}
1983: Tommy Drumm
1995: Paul Curran
2010: Bernard Brogan Jnr
2011: Alan Brogan

=== All Stars ===
- 7 All Stars: Cluxton
- 6 All Stars: Fenton, Kilkenny
- 5 All Stars: McCarthy, O'Leary
- 4 All Stars: B. Brogan Jnr, J. McCaffrey, Fitzsimons, Cullen, Flynn, Kelleher, Drumm
- 3 All Stars: A. Brogan, O'Toole, B. Rock, Redmond, O'Sullivan, O'Callaghan, D. Rock, Keaveney, Curran, Mannion
- 2 All Stars: Doyle, Howard, Mullins, Whelan, Hickey, Connolly, O'Driscoll, Hargan, Cooper, Barr, Duff, MacAuley, McMahon, O'Carroll

Note: Paddy Holden received 3 Cú Chulainn Awards, while Des Foley received 2 Cú Chulainn Awards.

=== All Stars Footballer of the Year ===
2010: Bernard Brogan Jnr
2011: Alan Brogan
2013: Michael Darragh Macauley
2015: Jack McCaffrey
2018: Brian Fenton
2019: Stephen Cluxton
2020: Brian Fenton^{2nd}

=== All Stars Young Footballer of the Year ===
2017: Con O'Callaghan

=== GPA Gaelic Football Team of the Year ===
2006: Stephen Cluxton, Bryan Cullen, Alan Brogan
2007: Stephen Cluxton^{2nd}, Barry Cahill, Alan Brogan^{2nd}
2010: Philly McMahon, Bernard Brogan Jnr*
2010 was the final year of the GPA Gaelic Football Team of the Year and the GPA Footballer of the Year as it was amalgamated with the All Star Awards.

=== GPA footballer of the year ===
2010: Bernard Brogan Jnr

=== Under 21 Footballer of the Year ===
2010: Rory O'Carroll
2012: Ciarán Kilkenny
2014: Conor McHugh
2017: Aaron Byrne

=== Under 20 Footballer of the Year ===
2019: Ciarán Archer

== Honours ==
Dublin has won the All-Ireland Senior Football Championship (SFC) final on 31 occasions – only Kerry, with 38 All-Ireland SFC titles, has won more. Dublin defeated Mayo by five points in the 132nd All-Ireland Final on 19 December 2020. This was their eighth championship since 2011. Dublin is the only county team in men's football or hurling to have won six consecutive All-Ireland Championships.

Dublin has also won the Leinster Championship on 63 occasions, and lost to Meath in the 2025 semi-finals. The 2024 final defeat of Louth was Dublin's eighth consecutive title, a record, and one that that saw Dublin become Leinster champion for a twelfth time in thirteen years. Only Meath split Dublin's wins during this period, by winning the Leinster Championship in 2010.

Dublin has won the National Football League on 14 occasions, most recently in 2013, 2014, 2015, 2016, 2018 and 2021. Only Kerry (21) has more league titles.

=== National ===
- All-Ireland Senior Football Championship
  - (gold) Winners (31): 1891, 1892, 1894, 1897, 1898, 1899, 1901, 1902, 1906, 1907, 1908, 1921, 1922, 1923, 1942, 1958, 1963, 1974, 1976, 1977, 1983, 1995, 2011, 2013, 2015, 2016, 2017, 2018, 2019, 2020, 2023
  - (silver) Runners-up (13): 1896, 1904, 1920, 1924, 1934, 1955, 1975, 1978, 1979, 1984, 1985, 1992, 1994
- National Football League
  - (gold) Winners (14): 1952–53, 1954–55, 1957–58, 1975–76, 1977–78, 1986–87, 1990–91, 1992–93, 2013, 2014, 2015, 2016, 2018, 2021 (shared)
  - (silver) Runners-up (14): 1925–26, 1933–34, 1940–41, 1951–52, 1961–62, 1966–67, 1974–75, 1976–77, 1987–88, 1988–89, 1998–99, 2011, 2017, 2020
- All-Ireland Junior Football Championship
  - (gold) Winners (6): 1914, 1916, 1939, 1948, 1960, 2008
- All-Ireland Under-21/Under-20 Football Championship
  - (gold) Winners (5): 2003, 2010, 2012, 2014, 2017
  - (silver) Runners-up (5): 1975, 1980, 2002, 2019, 2020
- All-Ireland Minor Football Championship
  - (gold) Winners (11): 1930, 1945, 1954, 1955, 1956, 1958, 1959, 1979, 1982, 1984, 2012
  - (silver) Runners-up (7): 1946, 1948, 1978, 1988, 2001, 2003, 2011

=== Provincial ===
- Leinster Senior Football Championship
  - (gold) Winners (63): 1891, 1892, 1894, 1896, 1897, 1898, 1899, 1901, 1902, 1904, 1906, 1907, 1908, 1920, 1921, 1922, 1923, 1924, 1932, 1933, 1934, 1941, 1942, 1955, 1958, 1959, 1962, 1963, 1965, 1974, 1975, 1976, 1977, 1978, 1979, 1983, 1984, 1985, 1989, 1992, 1993, 1994, 1995, 2002, 2005, 2006, 2007, 2008, 2009, 2011, 2012, 2013, 2014, 2015, 2016, 2017, 2018, 2019, 2020, 2021, 2022, 2023, 2024
  - (silver) Runners-up (24): 1890, 1895, 1910, 1912, 1915, 1917, 1919, 1927, 1928, 1944, 1957, 1961, 1964, 1980, 1982, 1986, 1987, 1988, 1990, 1996, 1999, 2000, 2001, 2026
- O'Byrne Cup
  - (gold) Winners (9): 1956, 1958, 1960, 1966, 1999, 2007, 2008, 2015, 2017
- Leinster Junior Football Championship
  - (gold) Winners (20): 1908, 1914, 1916, 1922, 1926, 1930, 1939, 1948, 1950, 1951, 1954, 1955, 1959, 1960, 1971, 1983, 1985, 1987, 1994, 2008
- Leinster Under-21/Under-20 Football Championship
  - (gold) Winners (16): 1974, 1975, 1980, 1984, 2002, 2003, 2005, 2009, 2010, 2012, 2014, 2015, 2016, 2017, 2019, 2020
  - (silver) Runners-up (10): 1976, 1992, 1993, 1998, 2001, 2004, 2018, 2021, 2022, 2023
- Leinster Minor Football Championship
  - (gold) Winners (35): 1930, 1933, 1934, 1945, 1946, 1948, 1949, 1954, 1955, 1956, 1958, 1959, 1961, 1968, 1970, 1971, 1976, 1978, 1979, 1981, 1982, 1984, 1986, 1988, 1994, 1999, 2001, 2003, 2009, 2011, 2012, 2014, 2017, 2022, 2023
  - (silver) Runners-up (17): 1929, 1935, 1947, 1950, 1962, 1963, 1967, 1969, 1972, 1977, 1987, 1991, 1996, 2000, 2019, 2021, 2024

=== Other ===
- RTÉ Sports Team of the Year Award
  - (gold) Winners (1): 2019
