= Clonturk =

Area on the Northside of Dublin, Ireland

Clonturk Cluain Torc (Irish)
- Neighbourhood
- Location in Dublin
- Coordinates: 53°22′26″N 6°14′36″W
- Country: Ireland
- Province: Leinster
- County: County Dublin
- Local authority: Dublin City Council
- Elevation: 96 m (315 ft)

Clonturk (Irish: Cluain Torc - Meadow of the boars) is an area on the Northside of Dublin, in Ireland. It is located in the south of the suburb of Drumcondra, just north of the River Tolka, but previously, Clonturk had been an alternative name for Drumcondra and the wider area. Clonturk lies within the Dublin 9 postal district. There is some evidence that the name originally was Ceann Torc or the 'headland of the boars', but had changed to Clonturk by the middle of the 16th century, perhaps under the influence of the more famous neighbouring placename Clontarf. The civil parish of Clonturk is part of the barony of Coolock.

== Clonturk House ==
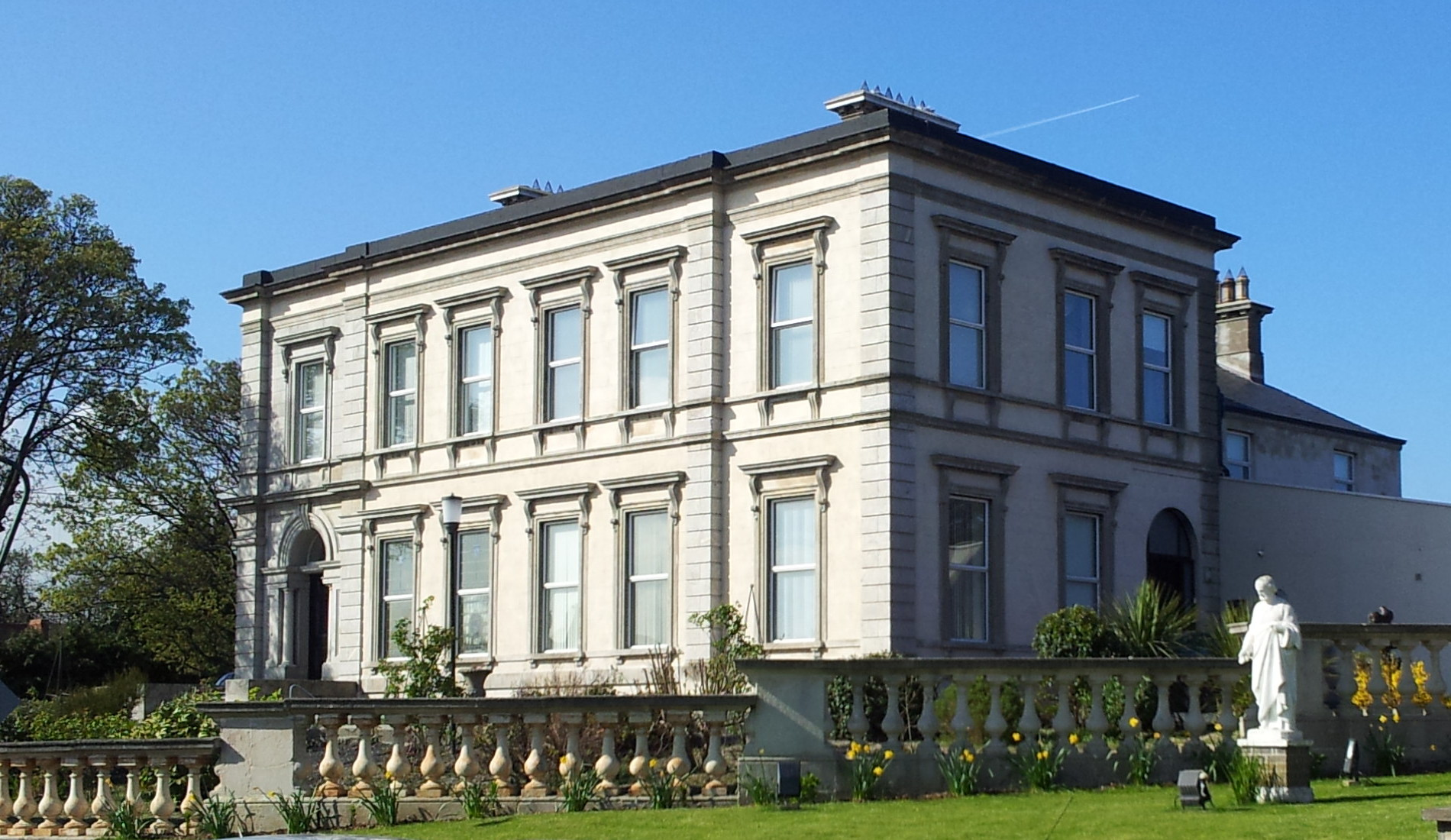
Rosminians centre, Clonturk House

The name 'Clonturk' mainly survives today through the existence of Clonturk House on Ormond Road. Clonturk House was built in 1830 by the then City Architect, as a gentleman’s residence and was extensively renovated in 1880 and given its Georgian frontage. For a number of years until 1960 Clonturk House was run by the Presbyterian Church which gave accommodation to girls attending school in Dublin both as fee-paying and on a subsidised basis. Until 2009 it was a home for blind men, run by the Rosminians order. The balustrade which now forms its boundary came from the original Carlisle Bridge and was moved there when this structure was replaced by the present O'Connell Bridge.

A numbering of neighbouring streets bear the name Clonturk, including Clonturk Park, Clonturk Gardens, and Clonturk Avenue, probably as a result of their proximity to Clonturk House. There is also Clonturk Community College, further north on the Swords Road at Whitehall.

== Sport ==
- Clonturk Park, off Richmond Road, is the home ground of Drumcondra F.C.
- The All-Ireland Senior Football Championship finals of 1890, 1891 and 1892 were played at Clonturk Park. The All-Ireland Senior Hurling Championship finals of 1890, 1891, 1892 and 1894 were also played at this venue. Nearby Croke Park now hosts these matches, since 1913.
