= 1923 All-Ireland Senior Football Championship final =

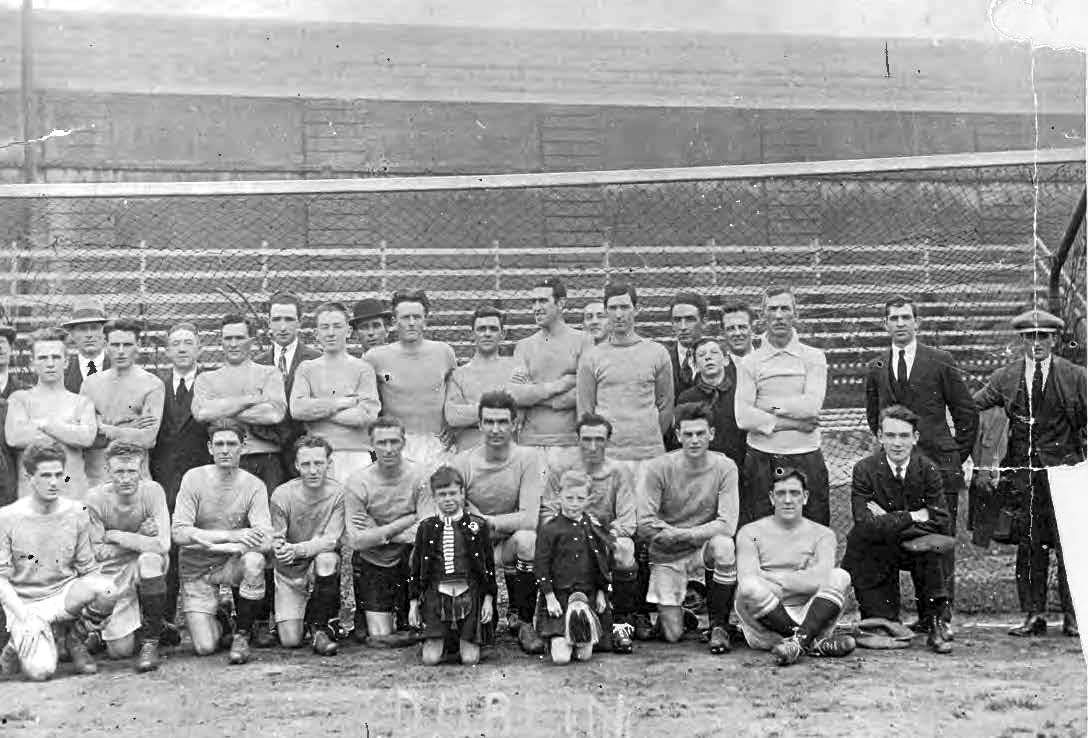
- Dublin, champions
- Event: 1923 All-Ireland Senior Football Championship
Dublin	Kerry
1–5 (8)	1–3 (6)
- Date: 28 September 1924
- Venue: Croke Park, Dublin
- Referee: James Byrne (Wexford)
- Attendance: 18,500
- Weather: dry, sunny, cold

The 1923 All-Ireland Senior Football Championship final was the 36th All-Ireland Final and the deciding match of the 1923 All-Ireland Senior Football Championship, an inter-county Gaelic football tournament for the top teams in Ireland.

== Pre-game ==
The Irish Civil War cast a shadow on the match — Kerry initially considered refusing to play in protest at the imprisonment of County Board chairman and republican Austin Stack. The Kerry team played a selection match between pro- and anti-Treaty players.

== Match ==
=== Summary ===
Dublin won the final by two points, with a goal by P. J. Kirwan. Kerry had led 1–2 to 0–1 at half-time, with a goal from Brosnan, but failed to score again in the game.

Joe Stynes, granduncle of Australian rules footballer Jim Stynes, played on the winning Dublin team that day.

It was the third of three All-Ireland SFC titles won by Dublin in the 1920s, which made them joint "team of the decade" with Kerry, also winner of three.

=== Details ===
28 September 1924
Final

Dublin	1–5 – 1–3	Kerry

Croke Park, Dublin
Attendance: 18,500
Referee: James Byrne (Wexford)

Dublin
Kerry

==== Dublin ====
- 1 Johnny McDonnell
- 2 Jack O'Reilly
- 3 Paddy McDonnell (c)
- 4 John Murphy
- 5 Joe Norris
- 6 Joe Synnott
- 7 Paddy Carey
- 8 Paddy Kirwan
- 9 Joe Stynes
- 10 Frank Burke
- 11 John Synnott
- 12 Martin Shanahan
- 13 Jack Sherlock
- 14 P. O'Beirne
- 15 Larry Stanley

==== Kerry ====
- 1 Jack Sheehy (goal)
- 2 Phil O'Sullivan (c)
- 3 Joe Barrett
- 4 Eugene Moriarty
- 5 John Russell
- 6 Toss Kelleher
- 7 Jerry Moriarty
- 8 Con Brosnan
- 9 Pat McKenna
- 10 John Ryan
- 11 Redmond Prendiville
- 12 J. J. Sheehy
- 13 John Bailey
- 14 Jimmy Bailey
- 15 Bill Landers

Subs
16 Denis O'Donoghue
17 Jack McCarthy
18 Moss Galvin
19 Bob Stack
20 Michael Murphy
21 Tom O'Mahony
22 Denis Hurley

== Post-match ==
The 1923 final marked the end of the initial era of the Dublin–Kerry Gaelic football rivalry. Dublin would not beat Kerry in the championship again until the 1976 final. An attendance of 25,000 people was reported at the 1923 final. Dublin would not win another All-Ireland SFC title until 1942, the county's 19-year barren spell rivalled only by their team of the late 1990s and 2000s.
