= 1924 All-Ireland Senior Football Championship final =

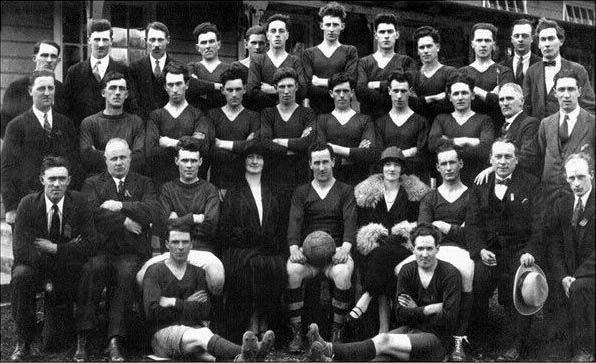
- Kerry, winners
- Event: 1924 All-Ireland Senior Football Championship
Kerry	Dublin
0–4	0–3
- Date: 26 April 1925
- Venue: Croke Park, Dublin
- Referee: T Shevlin (Roscommon)
- Attendance: 28,844

The 1924 All-Ireland Senior Football Championship final was the 37th All-Ireland Final and the deciding match of the 1924 All-Ireland Senior Football Championship, an inter-county Gaelic football tournament for the top teams in Ireland.

== Match ==
=== Summary ===
The Hogan Stand and a new scoreboard were unveiled at Croke Park for this final. Con Brosnan scored the winning point.

Dublin would not win another All-Ireland SFC title until 1942.

It was the first of three All-Ireland SFC titles won by Kerry in the 1920s, which made them joint "team of the decade" with Dublin, also winner of three.

=== Details ===
16 April 1925
Final

Kerry	0–4 – 0–3	Dublin

Croke Park, Dublin
Attendance: 28,844
Referee: T Shevlin (Roscommon)

Kerry
Dublin

==== Kerry ====
- 1 Jack Sheehy
- 2 Phil O'Sullivan (c)
- 3 Joe Barrett
- 4 Jack Walsh
- 5 Paul Russell
- 6 Jerry Moriarty
- 7 John Murphy
- 8 Con Brosnan
- 9 Bob Stack
- 10 John Ryan
- 11 John Joe Sheehy
- 12 Redmond Prendiville
- 13 John Bailey
- 14 Jimmy Bailey
- 15 Bill Landers

Trainer
Jeremiah Collins

==== Dublin ====
- Paddy McDonnell (c)
- Johnny McDonnell
- Paddy Carey
- W. O'Reilly
- Joe Synnott
- Joe Norris
- Jack O'Reilly
- Peter Synnott
- M. O'Brien
- Pat O'Beirne
- John Murphy
- Martin Shanahan
- Frank Burke
- G. Madigan
- Paddy Kirwan
