= 1922 All-Ireland Senior Football Championship final =

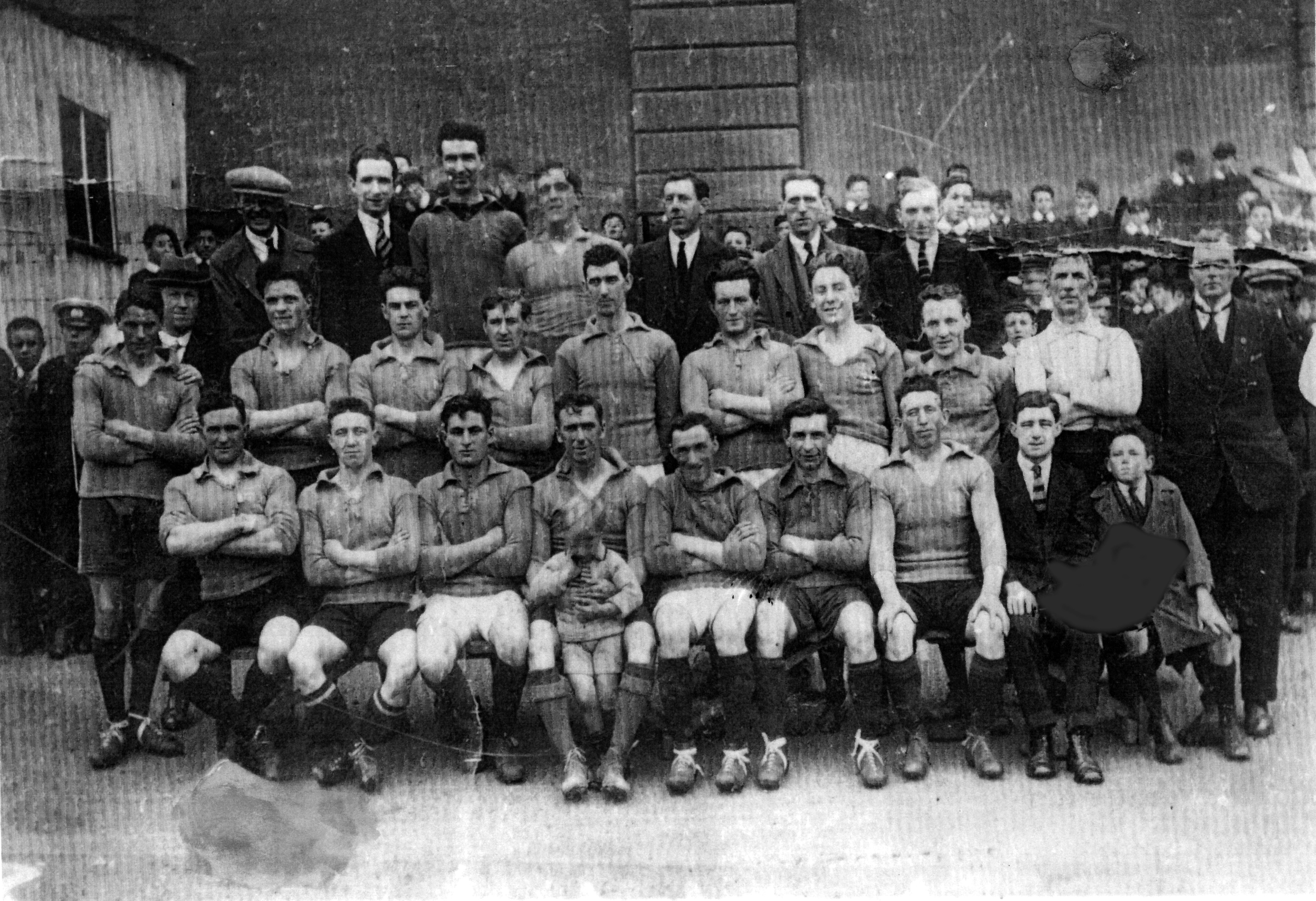
- Dublin, champions
- Event: 1922 All-Ireland Senior Football Championship
Dublin	Galway
0–6	0–4
- Date: 7 October 1923
- Venue: Croke Park, Dublin
- Referee: Pat Dunphy (Laois)
- Attendance: 11,792
- Weather: dull, drizzle, wind

The 1922 All-Ireland Senior Football Championship final was the 35th All-Ireland Final and the deciding match of the 1922 All-Ireland Senior Football Championship, an inter-county Gaelic football tournament for the top teams in Ireland.

Dublin defeated Galway.

Sligo had qualified, but were ejected in spectacular circumstances, and also stripped of their Connacht SFC title (given instead to Galway).

== Pre-match ==
This was Galway's second appearance in an All-Ireland SFC final following their first appearance (a loss to Kildare) in 1919. They would not win the All-Ireland SFC title until 1925.

Galway were lucky to have even been there in the first place. Sligo had won that year's Connacht Senior Football Championship, defeating Roscommon, Mayo and Galway, before disposing of Tipperary in their subsequent All-Ireland SFC semi-final meeting. However, "a flimsy technicality" led to a replay of the Galway versus Sligo Connacht SFC final, which Sligo lost. Galway had then become Connacht SFC winner, thus being elevated into the All-Ireland SFC final at Sligo's expense. Sligo were left with ... nothing.

== Match ==
=== Summary ===
Dublin won by six points to four, Paddy Carey, their captain, scoring the final point from a 50-yard kick.

It was the second of three All-Ireland SFC titles won by Dublin in the 1920s, which made them joint "team of the decade" with Kerry, also winner of three.

=== Details ===
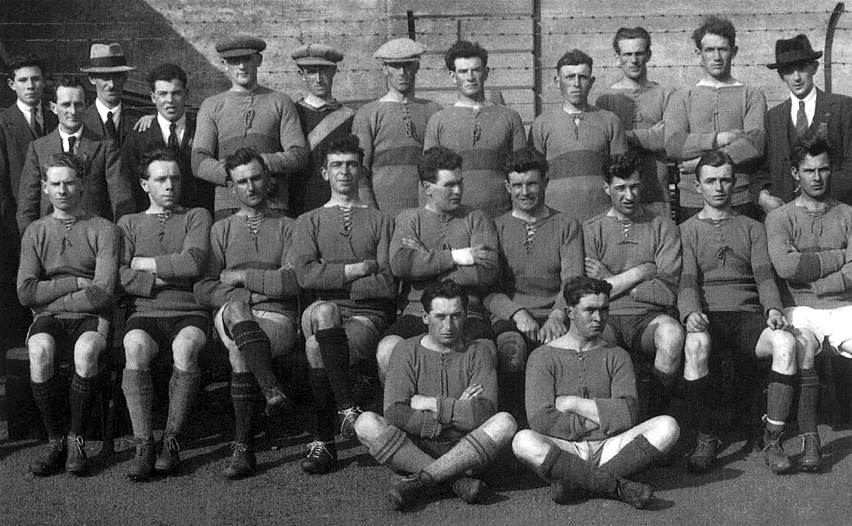
Galway, losing team

7 October 1923; Final	Dublin	0–6 – 0–4	Galway	Croke Park, Dublin; Attendance: 11,792; Referee: Pat Dunphy (Laois)

Dublin
Galway

==== Dublin ====
- Paddy Carey (c)
- Johnny McDonnell
- Paddy McDonnell
- Tony Gibbons
- Joe Synnott
- John Synnott
- Joe Norris
- Jack O'Reilly
- W. Rooney
- Charlie McDonald
- Bill Donovan
- Paddy Kirwan
- Frank Burke
- Toddy Pierse
