= 1921 All-Ireland Senior Football Championship final =

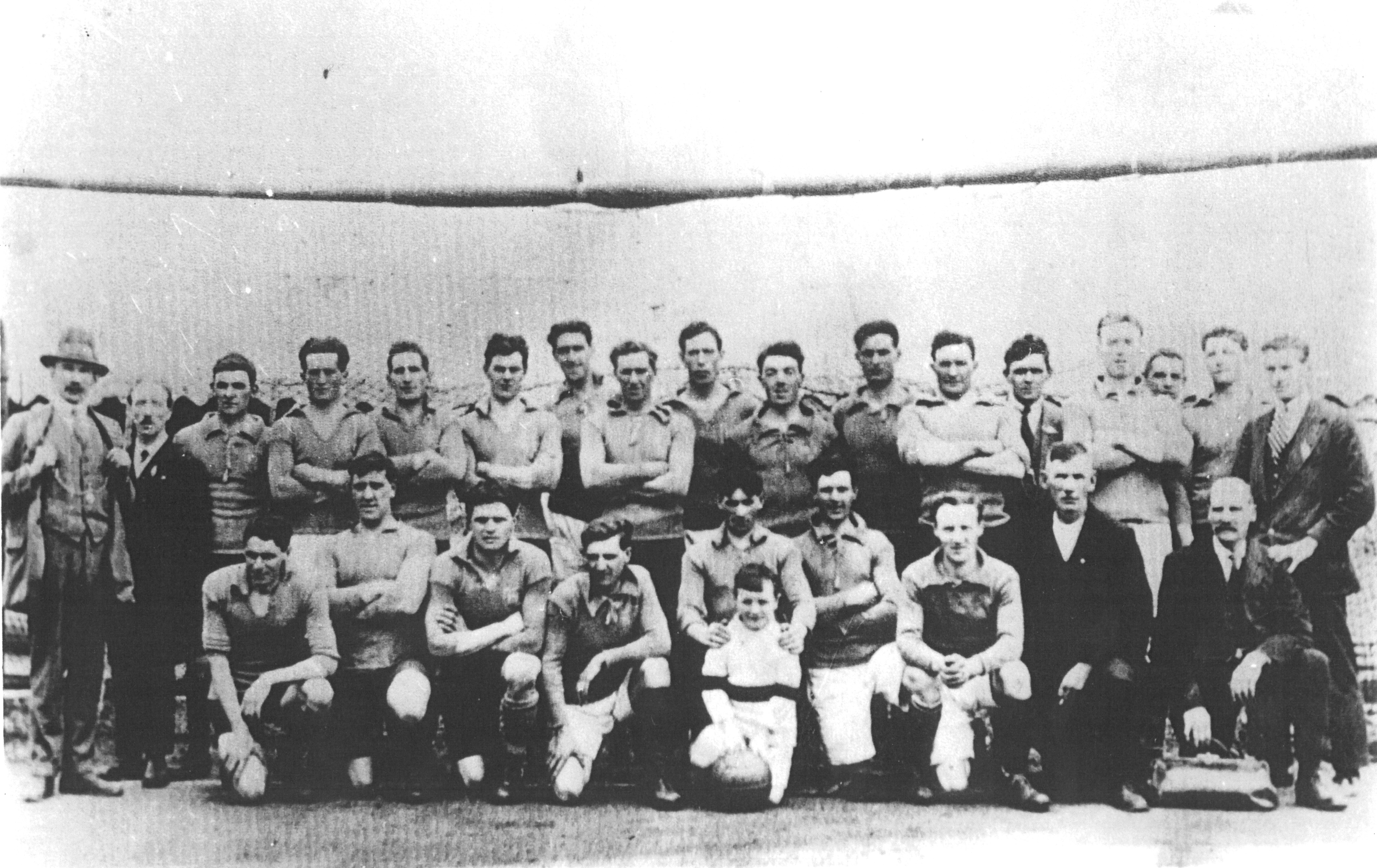
- Dublin, champions
- Event: 1921 All-Ireland Senior Football Championship
Dublin	Mayo
1–9 (12)	0–2 (2)
- Date: 17 June 1923
- Venue: Croke Park, Dublin
- Referee: Willie Walsh (Waterford)
- Attendance: 16,000
- Weather: Fine

The 1921 All-Ireland Senior Football Championship final was the 34th All-Ireland Final and the deciding match of the 1921 All-Ireland Senior Football Championship, an inter-county Gaelic football tournament for the top teams in Ireland.

== Match ==
=== Summary ===
Dublin led 0–4 to 0–1 at half-time, and a late Bill Fitzsimmons goal gave them a comprehensive victory.

It was the first of three All-Ireland SFC titles won by Dublin in the 1920s, which made them joint "team of the decade" with Kerry, also winner of three.

=== Details ===
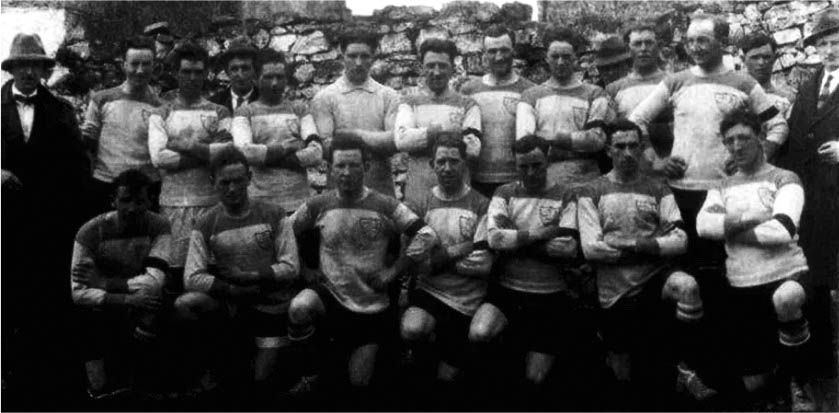
Team of Mayo, runners-up

17 June 1923
Final

Dublin	1–9 – 0–2	Mayo

Croke Park, Dublin
Referee: Willie Walsh (Waterford)
Attendance: 16,000

Dublin	Mayo

==== Dublin ====
- Eddie Carroll (c)
- Jack O'Reilly
- Joe Norris
- Paddy Carey
- Joe Synnott
- Paddy Kirwan
- Bill Donovan
- Paddy Fallon
- John Murphy
- Toddy Pierse
- Frank Burke
- Charlie McDonald
- Alec Belmaine
- J. O'Grady
- W. Fitzsimons
