= Cork–Waterford Gaelic football rivalry =

Cork-Waterford
- Location: County Cork; County Waterford
- Teams: Cork; Waterford
- First meeting: Cork 0-6 - 0-0 Waterford; 1890 Munster semi-final (17 August 1890)
- Latest meeting: Cork 1-12 - 1-11; 2017 Munster quarter-final (27 May 2017)

Statistics
- Total meetings: 36
- Most wins: Cork (31)
- All-time series: Cork 31-1-4 Waterford

The Cork-Waterford rivalry is a Gaelic football rivalry between Irish county teams Cork and Waterford, who first played each other in 1890. It is a rivalry that has been dominated by Cork. Cork's home ground is Páirc Uí Chaoimh and Waterford's home ground is the Walsh Park.

While Cork have 37 Munster titles, Waterford are regarded as provincial minnows and have won just one provincial title.

== All time results ==
=== Championship ===
| Cork win |
| Waterford win |
| Drawn game |

| No. | Date | Winners | Score | Runners-up | Venue | Stage |
|---|---|---|---|---|---|---|
| 1 | 17 August 1890 | Cork (1) | 0-6 - 0-0 | Waterford | Youghal | MSFC semi-final |
| 2 | 1 November 1891 | Cork (2) | 1-5 - 0-4 | Waterford | Youghal | MSFC final |
| 3 | 1 November 1898 | Cork (3) | 1-5 - 0-4 | Waterford | Dungarvan | MSFC quarter-final |
| 4 | 24 September 1899 | Waterford (1) | 1-3 - 0-4 | Cork | Lismore | MSFC final |
| 5 | 15 July 1900 | Cork (4) | w.o. | Waterford | Cork Park | MSFC final |
| 6 | 13 May 1906 | Cork (5) | 3-8 - 0-5 | Waterford | Dungarvan | MSFC quarter-final |
| 7 | 19 May 1907 | Cork (6) | 2-7 - 1-2 | Waterford | Dungarvan | MSFC semi-final |
| 8 | 18 May 1908 | Waterford (2) | 1-7 - 1-5 | Cork | Mallow | MSFC semi-final |
| 9 | 11 July 1909 | Cork (7) | 2-7 - 0-3 | Waterford | Dungarvan | MSFC semi-final |
| 10 | 29 October 1911 | Cork (8) | 2-5 - 0-1 | Waterford | Dungarvan | MSFC final |
| 11 | 14 June 1914 | Cork (9) | 0-3 - 0-2 | Waterford | Cork Athletic Grounds | MSFC semi-final |
| 12 | 30 July 1916 | Cork (10) | 4-3 - 2-4 | Waterford | Cork Athletic Grounds | MSFC semi-final |
| 13 | 18 May 1919 | Waterford (3) | 2-0 - 0-2 | Cork | Dungarvan | MSFC quarter-final |
| 14 | 8 July 1923 | Cork (11) | 1-5 - 2-1 | Waterford | Cork Athletic Grounds | MSFC quarter-final |
| 15 | 18 May 1924 | Cork (12) | 2-1 - 0-0 | Waterford | Fraher Field | MSFC quarter-final |
| 16 | 27 June 1926 | Cork (13) | 1-6 - 2-1 | Waterford | Cork Athletic Grounds | MSFC quarter-final |
| 17 | 14 May 1933 | Cork | 4-4 - 4-4 | Waterford | Mitchelstown | MSFC quarter-final |
| 18 | 2 July 1933 | Cork (14) | 2-7 - 0-1 | Waterford | Fraher Field | MSFC quarter-final replay |
| 19 | 14 May 1939 | Cork (15) | 0-8 - 0-7 | Waterford | Fraher Field | MSFC preliminary round |
| 20 | 14 June 1942 | Cork (16) | 1-8 - 0-2 | Waterford | Fraher Field | MSFC semi-final |
| 21 | 2 July 1950 | Cork (17) | 3-8 - 2-2 | Waterford | Páirc MacGearailt | MSFC quarter-final |
| 22 | 5 July 1953 | Cork (18) | 1-7 - 1-5 | Waterford | Walsh Park | MSFC semi-final |
| 23 | 24 June 1956 | Cork (19) | 0-12 - 0-1 | Waterford | Castle Grounds | MSFC semi-final |
| 24 | 21 July 1957 | Cork (20) | 0-16 - 1-2 | Waterford | Semple Stadium | MSFC final |
| 25 | 29 June 1958 | Cork (21) | 1-11 - 1-4 | Waterford | Páirc MacGearailt | MSFC semi-final |
| 26 | 10 July 1960 | Waterford (4) | 1-9 - 0-11 | Cork | Castle Grounds | MSFC semi-final |
| 27 | 9 June 1963 | Cork (22) | 2-14 - 2-1 | Waterford | Páirc Mac Gearailt | MSFC semi-final |
| 28 | 14 June 1964 | Cork (23) | 2-8 - 1-2 | Waterford | Fraher Field | MSFC semi-final |
| 29 | 11 June 1972 | Cork (24) | 2-8 - 0-9 | Waterford | Páirc MacGearailt | MSFC semi-final |
| 30 | 28 June 1981 | Cork (25) | 2-18 - 0-7 | Waterford | Fraher Field | MSFC semi-final |
| 31 | 28 May 1995 | Cork (26) | 0-23 - 0-9 | Waterford | Páirc Uí Chaoimh | MSFC quarter-final |
| 32 | 23 May 1999 | Cork (27) | 3-23 - 0-4 | Waterford | Fraher Field | MSFC quarter-final |
| 33 | 13 May 2001 | Cork (28) | 3-16 - 1-7 | Waterford | Páirc Uí Chaoimh | MSFC quarter-final |
| 34 | 24 May 2009 | Cork (29) | 2-18 - 1-7 | Waterford | Fraher Field | MSFC quarter-final |
| 35 | 5 June 2011 | Cork (30) | 5-17 - 2-13 | Waterford | Páirc Uí Chaoimh | MSFC semi-final |
| 36 | 27 May 2017 | Cork (31) | 1-12 - 1-11 | Waterford | Fraher Field | MSFC quarter-final |
