= Cavan–Monaghan Gaelic football rivalry =

Cavan–Monaghan
- Location: County Cavan; County Monaghan
- Teams: Cavan; Monaghan
- First meeting: Monaghan 0-2 - 0-2 Cavan; 1888 Ulster final (19 August 1888)
- Latest meeting: Monaghan 0-27 - 2-14 Cavan; 2024 Ulster quarter final (19 April 2026)

Statistics
- Total meetings: 60
- Most wins: Cavan (30)
- All-time series: Cavan 30-13-17 Monaghan

The Cavan–Monaghan rivalry is a Gaelic football rivalry between Irish county teams Cavan and Monaghan, who first played each other in 1888. It is considered to be one of the biggest rivalries in Ulster Gaelic games. Cavan's home ground is Kingspan Breffni Park and Monaghan's home ground is St Tiernach's Park.

== All-time results ==
=== Legend ===
Cavan win
Monaghan win
Match was a draw

=== Senior ===
No.	Date	Winners	Score	Runners-up	Venue	Stage
1.	19 August 1888	Cavan	0-2 - 0-2	Monaghan	Drogheda	Ulster final
2.	9 September 1888	Monaghan	0-3 - 0-0	Cavan	Bryanstown	Ulster final replay
3.	12 March 1905	Cavan	0-11 - 0-3	Monaghan	Newbliss	Ulster semi final
4.	1904	Cavan	1-8 - 0-3	Monaghan	Newbliss	Ulster semi final
5.	1905	Cavan	0-7 - 0-3	Monaghan	[[]]	Ulster final
6.	28 April 1907	Monaghan	2-4 - 0-5	Cavan	Cootehill	Ulster quarter final
7.	15 June 1913	Monaghan	2-0 - 1-3	Cavan	Cootehill	Ulster quarter final
8.	20 July 1913	Monaghan	0-3 - 0-2	Cavan	Cavan	Ulster quarter final replay
9.	22 August 1915	Cavan	0-0 - 0-0	Monaghan		Ulster final
10.	22 August 1915	Cavan	0-0 - 0-0	Monaghan	Belfast	Ulster final
11.	22 August 1915	Cavan	2-5 - 3-2	Monaghan	Belturbet	Ulster final
12.	22 August 1915	Cavan	2-5 - 3-2	Monaghan	Belturbet	Ulster final
13.	12 September 1915	Cavan	0-4 - 0-3	Monaghan	Clones	Ulster final replay
14.	1 July 1917	Monaghan	3-1 - 0-2	Cavan	Cootehill	Ulster semi final
15.	23 May 1920	Cavan	2-2 - 1-3	Monaghan	Clones	Ulster preliminary round
16.	11 December 1921	Monaghan	0-8 - 0-8	Cavan	Clones	Ulster semi final
17.	22 January 1922	Monaghan	2-2 - 0-2	Cavan	Clones	Ulster semi final replay
18.	22 April 1923	Monaghan	2-2 - 0-2	Cavan	Clones	Ulster final
19.	22 January 1923	Monaghan	2-7 - 2-6	Cavan	Clones	Ulster final replay
20.	2 September 1923	Cavan	5-10 - 1-1	Monaghan	Cavan	Ulster final
21.	21 September 1924	Cavan	1-3 - 0-6	Monaghan	Belturbet	Ulster final
22.	2 November 1924	Cavan	2-3 - 1-6	Monaghan	Ballybay	Ulster final replay
23.	27 June 1926	Monaghan	0-7 - 0-7	Cavan	Belturbet	Ulster semi final
24.	1 August 1926	Monaghan	1-3 - 0-7	Cavan	Ballybay	Ulster semi final replay
25.	19 June 1927	Monaghan	2-6 - 1-6	Cavan	St. Mary's Park	Ulster semi final
26.	28 July 1929	Monaghan	1-4 - 1-4	Cavan	Breffni Park	Ulster final
27.	11 August 1929	Monaghan	1-10 - 0-7	Cavan	Carrickmacross	Ulster final replay
28.	27 July 1930	Monaghan	4-3 - 1-5	Cavan	Carrickmacross	Ulster final
29.	29 May 1932	Cavan	8-8 - 2-6	Monaghan	Belturbet	Ulster semi final
30.	30 June 1935	Cavan	2-12 - 0-1	Monaghan	Breffni Park	Ulster semi final
31.	9 August 1936	Cavan	1-7 - 0-7	Monaghan	St. Mary's Park	Ulster final
32.	6 July 1941	Cavan	3-7 - 3-2	Monaghan	Breffni Park	Ulster quarter-final
33.	14 June 1942	Cavan	1-4 - 0-6	Monaghan	St. Mary's Park	Ulster final
34.	1 August 1943	Cavan	2-3 - 0-5	Monaghan	Breffni Park	Ulster final
35.	15 June 1947	Cavan	0-9 - 1-6	Monaghan	Breffni Park	Ulster quarter final
36.	22 July 1947	Cavan	1-11 - 1-9	Monaghan	St. Tiernach's Park	Ulster quarter final replay
37.	11 July 1948	Cavan	1-9 - 0-7	Monaghan	Breffni Park	Ulster semi final
38.	27 July 1952	Cavan	1-8 - 0-8	Monaghan	Breffni Park	Ulster final
39.	21 June 1953	Cavan	2-7 - 0-2	Monaghan	Breffni Park	Ulster quarter final
40.	27 June 1954	Cavan	3-8 - 2-5	Monaghan	St. Tiernach's Park	Ulster quarter final
41.	16 June 1957	Cavan	1-12 - 1-5	Monaghan	Breffni Park	Ulster quarter final
42.	15 June 1958	Cavan	0-7 - 0-7	Monaghan	St. Tiernach's Park	Ulster quarter final
43.	7 July 1958	Cavan	1-9 - 1-5	Monaghan	Breffni Park	Ulster quarter final 1st replay
44.	7 July 1958	Cavan	0-14 - 0-6	Monaghan	St. Tiernach's Park	Ulster quarter final 2nd replay
45.	7 July 1968	Cavan	1-11 - 0-5	Monaghan	St. Tiernach's Park	Ulster semi final
46.	11 June 1972	Cavan	3-9 - 0-6	Monaghan	Casement Park	Ulster quarter final
47.	24 May 1987	Cavan	0-12 - 0-10	Monaghan	Breffni Park	Ulster quarter final
48.	22 May 1988	Monaghan	0-16 - 0-14	Cavan	St. Tiernach's Park	Ulster quarter final
49.	23 May 1993	Monaghan	2-9 - 0-15	Cavan	St. Mary's Park	Ulster quarter final
50.	30 May 1993	Monaghan	3-10 - 2-8	Cavan	Breffni Park	Ulster quarter final replay
51.	22 May 1994	Monaghan	3-10 - 1-12	Cavan	Breffni Park	Ulster quarter final
52.	2 July 1995	Cavan	0-10 - 1-9	Monaghan	St Tiernach's Park	Ulster semi final
53.	24 June 2001	Cavan	0-13 - 0-11	Monaghan	St Tiernach's Park	Ulster semi final
54.	29 June 2013	Monaghan	1-10 - 0-12	Cavan	St Tiernach's Park	Ulster semi final
55.	24 May 2015	Monaghan	0-16 - 0-15	Cavan	Breffni Park	Ulster quarter final
56.	11 June 2017	Monaghan	1-15 - 0-15	Cavan	Breffni Park	Ulster quarter final
57.	18 May 2019	Cavan	1-13 - 0-12	Monaghan	Breffni Park	Ulster quarter final
58.	31 October 2020	Cavan	2-15 - 1-17	Monaghan	St Tiernach's Park	Ulster preliminary round
59.	7 April 2024	Cavan	3-12 - 1-12	Monaghan	St Tiernach's Park	Ulster preliminary round
60.	19 April 2026	Monaghan	0-27 - 2-14	Cavan	St Tiernach's Park	Ulster quarter final
