= John Synnott =

Irish Gaelic footballer

Personal information
- Native name: Seán Sionóid (Irish)
- Born: 10 October 1895 Sheriff Street, Dublin, Ireland
- Occupation: Labourer

Sport
- Sport: Gaelic football
Club
- Years: Club
- O'Tooles
Club titles
- Dublin titles: 9
Inter-county
- Years: County
- 1919-1928: Dublin
Inter-county titles
- Leinster titles: 5
- All-Irelands: 3

John Francis Synnott (born 10 October 1895) was an Irish Gaelic footballer. His championship career at senior level with the Dublin county team spanned ten seasons from 1919 until 1928.

Synnott first played competitive football during a golden age for the O'Tooles club. In ten years from 1918 until 1928 he won nine county senior championship medals with the club.

Success at club level saw Synnott join the Dublin senior team and he made his debut during the 1919 championship. Over the course of the next decade he had much success and won three successive All-Ireland medals between 1921 and 1923, albeit his first medal was as a non-playing substitute. He also won five Leinster medals.

Synnott's brothers, Joe and Peter Synnott, also played with Dublin.

== Honours ==
O'Tooles

- Dublin Senior Football Championship (9): 1918, 1919, 1920, 1922, 1923, 1924, 1925, 1926, 1928

Dublin

- All-Ireland Senior Football Championship (3): 1921, 1922, 1923
- Leinster Senior Football Championship (5): 1920, 1921, 1922, 1923, 1924
