= 1919 All-Ireland Senior Football Championship final =

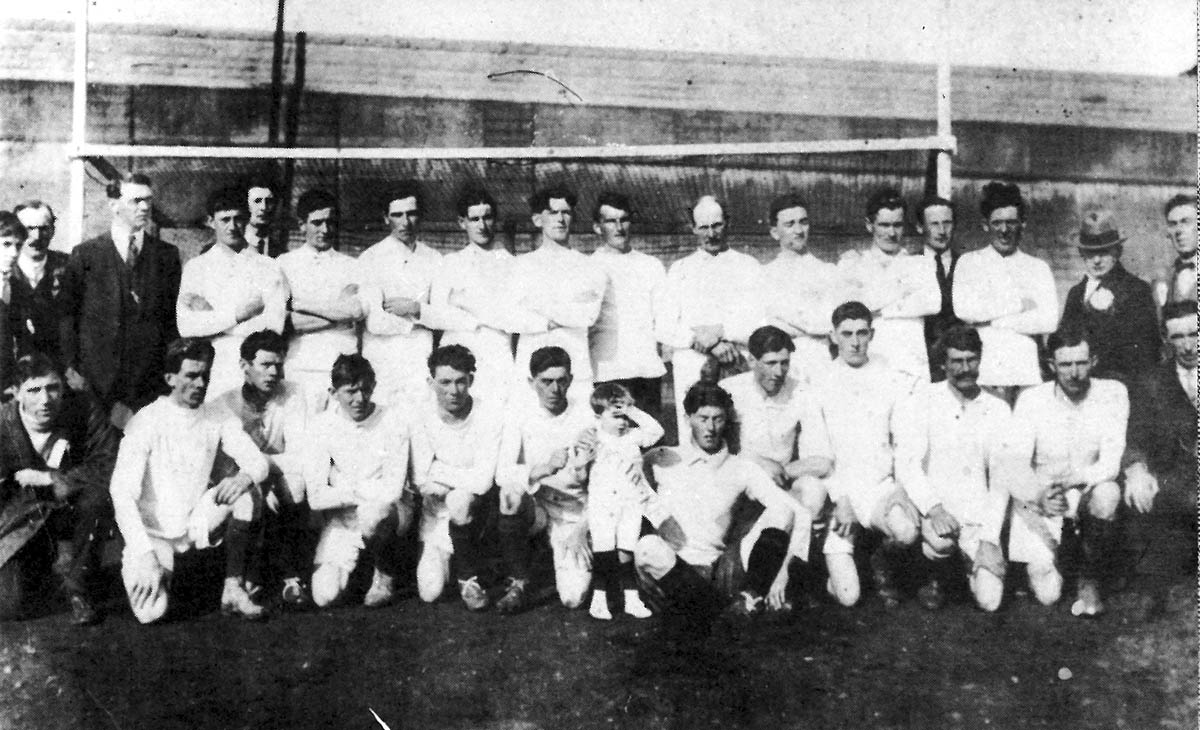
- Kildare, champions
- Event: 1919 All-Ireland Senior Football Championship
Kildare	Galway
2–5 (11)	0–1 (1)
- Date: 28 September 1919
- Venue: Croke Park, Dublin
- Referee: Pat Dunphy (Laois)
- Attendance: 32,000

The 1919 All-Ireland Senior Football Championship final was the 32nd All-Ireland Final and the deciding match of the 1919 All-Ireland Senior Football Championship, an inter-county Gaelic football tournament for the top teams in Ireland.

== Background ==
This was Galway's first appearance in an All-Ireland SFC final.

Wexford were the reigning champions, having completed a first senior four-in-a-row in 1918. However, Wexford did not qualify for the 1919 final as they were knocked out in the semi-final of that year's Leinster Senior Football Championship.

== Match ==
This year's final was played on 28 September.

=== Summary ===
Kildare won an extremely one-sided final, with goals from Frank "Joyce" Conlan and Jim O'Connor.

=== Details ===
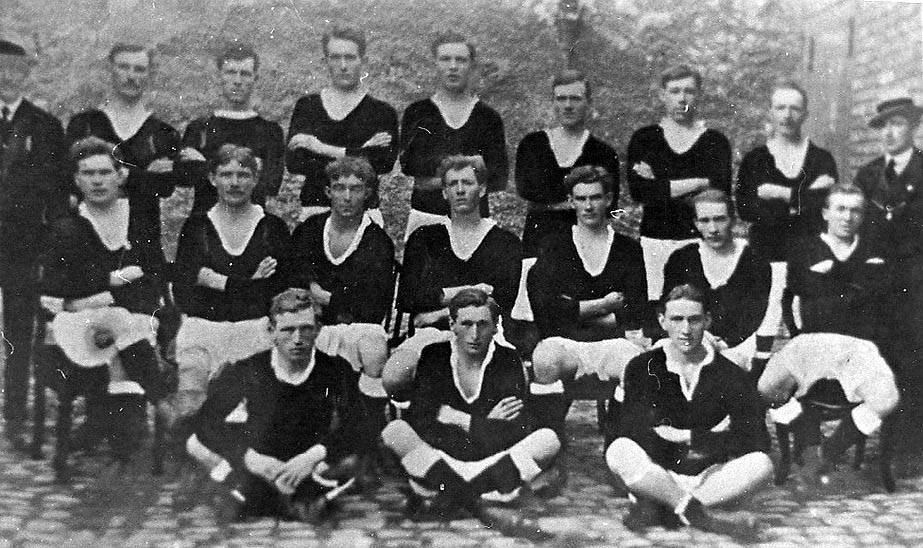
Galway, losing team

28 Sep 1919; Final	Kildare	2–5 – 0–1	Galway	Croke Park, Dublin; Referee: Pat Dunphy (Laois)

Kildare
Galway

==== Kildare ====
- 1 Larry Cribbin
- 2 Jim Conlon
- 3 James Moran
- 4 Tom Goulding
- 5 Mick Buckley
- 6 Joe O'Connor
- 7 Paul Doyle
- 8 Mick Sammon
- 9 Larry Stanley (c)
- 10 George Magan
- 11 Jim Stanley
- 12 Chris Flynn
- 13 Bernie McGlade
- 14 James O'Connor
- 15 Frank Conlan

== Legacy ==
Galway would not win the All-Ireland SFC title until 1925, having also been beaten in the final of 1922.

Kildare would not return to the All-Ireland SFC final until 1926.
