= Joe Stynes =

Irish politician and sportsman

Sport
- Sport: Gaelic football
Club
- Years: Club
- 1921 - 1925: O'Tooles
Club titles
- Dublin titles: 4
Inter-county
- Years: County
- 1922 - 1923: Dublin
Inter-county titles
- Leinster titles: 1
- All-Irelands: 1

Joseph Andrew Stynes (15 January 1903 – 29 January 1991) was an Irish Republican and played Gaelic football and soccer.

== In Dublin ==
Stynes was born in Newbridge, County Kildare, and attended Newbridge College, where he first played Gaelic football and hurling. He moved to Dublin after World War I to find work. He was sworn into the IRA in 1920 by Seán Lemass, joining "C" Company, 2nd battalion, Dublin brigade. He was stewarding in Croke Park on Bloody Sunday 1920, while carrying concealed guns for the IRA. When British security forces raided the ground, he dumped the guns and escaped over a wall. He participated in the burning of the Custom House in 1921.

Stynes played Gaelic football for the McCracken's club on the Northside, then transferred to the elite O'Tooles club in February 1922. He was an 'outstanding' forward with 'rare qualities'. He took the anti-Treaty side during the Irish Civil War, but managed to play several games for the senior Dublin county football team while "on the run" from the Irish Free State authorities. He fought in the O'Connell Street area during the Battle of Dublin, evading capture during the evacuation of the Hammam Hotel. An attempt to tunnel into Mountjoy Prison from an adjoining house ended when the house was raided while Stynes was absent. He missed Dublin's win in the 1922 All-Ireland final (played 7 October 1923) as by then he was interned in the Curragh Camp. Major General Tom Ennis of the National Army, a former teammate of Stynes who took the pro-Treaty side, secured Stynes' availability for subsequent Dublin matches, and he got a winner's medal for the 1923 final (played 28 September 1924), in which he scored the final two points. He missed the 1924 final (played 26 April 1925) after being suspended by the GAA for breaching its ban on playing "foreign" games by playing soccer, a game he had learnt while in the Curragh.

While suspended from the GAA, he played soccer for Bohemians, where he scored 13 times in 28 appearances during the 1925–26 season. In the Leinster Senior Cup final of 1926, he played well, but retired injured, as Bohs beat Shelbourne 2–1. He also played semi-professionally for Shelbourne at a time when work was hard to find, partly because of his unpopular political views.

== In New York ==
In 1926, Stynes emigrated to the United States, settling in New York City, where he worked as an accountant with Cartier jewellers. He remained active in both North American GAA and emigrant Irish Republican groups. In later years, he returned annually to Ireland for the All Ireland football final in Dublin and political meetings in Northern Ireland.

In May 1927, he played for a New York county team that beat the visiting All-Ireland champions, Kerry. He regularly returned to visit Ireland, and represented America in football internationals against Ireland at the Tailteann Games in Dublin in both 1928 and 1932. During his 1928 trip, he turned out once more for Dublin in their Leinster Final defeat to Kildare. He also represented New York touring sides against Mayo in 1932 and Kerry in 1933. In December 1932, he won a Dublin junior club title with Sean McDermotts. He won New York state championships with Kildare in 1938 and with Kilkenny as late as 1947. He also played on the New York hurling teams in 1943 and 1946.

In 1938, Stynes signed on behalf of the American GAA an Irish-American petition for the release of Frank Ryan, the IRA leader imprisoned by Franco's Nationalists during the Spanish Civil War for fighting in the International Brigades. In 1939, he was indicted and charged with attempting to bribe US Customs officials while operating as an agent for the Irish Sweepstakes. He was politically active in Clan na Gael, and after 1948 was leader of the few branches that had remained loyal to the rump of the IRA. In 1949, Stynes supported a decision, which split the Clan, to use its funds for a monument in Dublin to Seán Russell rather than retaining them for a future IRA campaign. After the decline of Clan na Gael, and the outbreak of the Northern Troubles, he was sympathetic to NORAID. He sided with Republican Sinn Féin after its 1986 split from Sinn Féin, and in 1987 he co-founded the National Irish Freedom Committee (NIFC; Irish: Cumann Na Saoirse Náisiúnta) for its American supporters. Most younger and American-born Irish republicans remained with NORAID and Sinn Féin.

He died at his home in Queens, New York.

== Relatives ==
Stynes married Bridget Ní Mahon, originally from Athy, in 1930 in New York. They had nine children. His grandson Chris Stynes played Major League Baseball.

Joe Stynes's brother Peter played Gaelic football for Dublin in the 1925 and 1926 Leinster championships, and got a 1926 League runners-up medal. Peter won Dublin club titles with O'Toole's in 1925, 1926, and 1928. Peter was the father of Jim Stynes, Australian rules footballer, and his brother Brian, who won an All-Ireland with Dublin in 1995.
