= Johnny McDonnell (Gaelic footballer) =

Irish Gaelic footballer

Personal information
- Native name: Seán Mac Dónaill (Irish)

Sport
- Sport: Gaelic football
- Position: Goalkeeper
Club
- Years: Club
- O'Tooles
Club titles
- Dublin titles: 10
Inter-county
- Years: County
- 1919–1934: Dublin
Inter-county titles
- Leinster titles: 7
- All-Irelands: 2

John McDonnell was an Irish Gaelic footballer. His championship career at senior level with the Dublin county team spanned ten seasons from 1919 until 1934.

McDonnell first played competitive football during a golden age for the O'Tooles club. In ten years from 1918 until 1928 he won nine county senior championship medals with the club before adding a tenth in 1931.

Success at club level saw McDonnell join the Dublin senior team and he made his debut during the 1919 championship. Over the course of the next decade he had much success and won back-to-back All-Ireland medals in 1922 and 1923. He also won seven Leinster medals.

His brother, Paddy McDonnell, was also an All-Ireland medal winner with Dublin.

McDonnell's appearances record for Dublin was not broken until Stephen Cluxton became his county's most capped player against Meath in the National League on 17 October 2020.

== Honours ==
O'Tooles

- Dublin Senior Football Championship (10): 1918, 1919, 1920, 1922, 1923, 1924, 1925, 1926, 1928, 1931

Dublin

- All-Ireland Senior Football Championship (2): 1922, 1923
- Leinster Senior Football Championship (7): 1920, 1922, 1923, 1924, 1932, 1933, 1934
