= Donegal–Tyrone Gaelic football rivalry =

Donegal–Tyrone
- Location: County Donegal; County Tyrone
- Teams: Donegal; Tyrone
- First meeting: Donegal 4-3 - 1-0 Tyrone; 1919 Ulster quarter-final (25 May 1919)
- Latest meeting: Donegal 0-13 - 1-18 Tyrone; 2023 All-Ireland Senior Football Championship Preliminary Quarter-Finals (24 June 2023)

Statistics
- Total meetings: 25
- Most wins: Tyrone (13)
- All-time series: Tyrone 14-1-10 Donegal
- Largest victory: Tyrone 2-13 - 0-7 Donegal; 1989 Ulster final replay (23 July 1989)

The Donegal–Tyrone rivalry is a Gaelic football rivalry between Irish county teams Donegal and Tyrone, who first played each other in 1919. It is considered to be one of the biggest and most intense rivalries in Gaelic games. Donegal's home ground is MacCumhaill Park and Tyrone's home ground is Healy Park.

While Tyrone have 13 Ulster titles and Donegal are ranked in sixth position on the roll of honour, they have also enjoyed success in the All-Ireland Senior Hurling Championship, having won 5 championship titles between them to date.

Following the 2013 National Football League meeting of the teams, the then reigning All Stars Footballer of the Year, Donegal's Karl Lacey, was hit by some spit from the mouth of a Tyrone fan. Lacey was targeted as he left the pitch via the tunnel at Healy Park in Omagh. He had not been playing in the game due to a hip injury. President of the Gaelic Athletic Association Liam O'Neill condemned the action against Lacey, "I have always said that any behaviour that makes anyone feel less good about themselves or about being involved in Gaelic games is abhorrent to me. I wouldn't condone that type of behaviour and to spit at anyone is disgraceful behaviour. I really cannot understand the behaviour of anybody who insults or demeans anyone. It has no part in Gaelic games. My message to those people is 'we don't need you'. I don't want them in our organisation and I don't want them going to our games. I would appeal to them to go and leave our games to people who want to come and enjoy themselves."

== All-time results ==
=== Legend ===
Tyrone win
Donegal win
Match was a draw

=== Senior ===
No.	Date	Winners	Score	Runners-up	Venue	Stage
1.	25 May 1919	Donegal	4-3 - 1-0	Tyrone	Strabane	Ulster Quarter-Final
2.	18 May 1924	Tyrone	0-2 - 0-1	Donegal	Letterkenny	Ulster Quarter-Final
3.	20 June 1943	Tyrone	1-8 - 0-7	Donegal	Omagh	Ulster Quarter-Final
4.	14 June 1953	Tyrone	8-7 - 0-3	Donegal	MacCumhaill Park	Ulster Quarter-Final
5.	13 June 1954	Tyrone	1-7 - 1-5	Donegal	O'Neill Park	Ulster Quarter-Final
6.	14 July 1957	Tyrone	3-5 - 2-3	Donegal	Breffni Park	Ulster Semi-Final
7.	30 July 1972	Donegal	2-13 - 1-11	Tyrone	St Tiernach's Park	Ulster Final
8.	24 June 1973	Tyrone	0-12 - 1-7	Donegal	MacCumhaill Park	Ulster Quarter-Final
9.	16 June 1974	Donegal	1-9 - 0-8	Tyrone	MacCumhaill Park	Ulster Quarter-Final
10.	17 June 1979	Donegal	1-11 - 1-9	Tyrone	Dean McGlinchey Park	Ulster Quarter-Final
11.	15 June 1980	Tyrone	1-17 - 0-8	Donegal	St. Molaise Park	Ulster Quarter-Final
12.	16 July 1989	Tyrone	0-11 - 0-11	Donegal	St Tiernach's Park	Ulster Final
13.	23 July 1989	Tyrone	2-13 - 0-7	Donegal	St Tiernach's Park	Ulster Final Replay
14.	26 June 1994	Tyrone	1-15 - 0-10	Donegal	Breffni Park	Ulster Semi-Final
15.	20 June 2004	Donegal	1-11 - 0-9	Tyrone	St Tiernach's Park	Ulster Semi-Final
16.	17 June 2007	Tyrone	2-15 - 1-7	Donegal	St Tiernach's Park	Ulster Semi-Final
17.	26 June 2011	Donegal	2-6 - 0-9	Tyrone	St Tiernach's Park	Ulster Semi-Final
18.	30 June 2012	Donegal	0-12 - 0-10	Tyrone	St Tiernach's Park	Ulster Semi-Final
19.	26 May 2013	Donegal	2-10 - 1-10	Tyrone	MacCumhaill Park	Ulster Quarter-Final
20.	17 May 2015	Donegal	1-13 - 1-11	Tyrone	MacCumhaill Park	Ulster Preliminary Round
21.	17 June 2016	Tyrone	0-13 - 0-11	Donegal	St Tiernach's Park	Ulster Final
22.	18 June 2017	Tyrone	1-21 - 1-12	Donegal	St Tiernach's Park	Ulster Semi-Final
23.	5 August 2018	Tyrone	2-17 - 1-16	Donegal	MacCumhaill Park	All-Ireland Quarter-Final group stage
24.	8 June 2019	Donegal	1-16 - 0-15	Tyrone	Breffni Park	Ulster Semi-Final
25.	1 November 2020	Donegal	1-13 - 1-11	Tyrone	MacCumhaill Park	Ulster Quarter-Final
26.	18 July 2021	Tyrone	0-23 - 1-14	Donegal	Brewster Park	Ulster Semi-Final
27.	24 June 2023	Tyrone	1-18 - 0-13	Donegal	MacCumhaill Park	All-Ireland Preliminary Quarter-Final
