= Dublin–Galway Gaelic football rivalry =

Sports rivalry in Ireland

Dublin–Galway
- Location: County Dublin; County Galway
- Teams: Dublin; Galway
- First meeting: Dublin 0-6 – 0-4; 1922 All-Ireland final (7 October 1923)
- Latest meeting: Dublin 1-25 – 1-21 Galway; 2026 All-Ireland Senior Football Championship (28 June 2026)

Statistics
- Total meetings: 13
- Most wins: Dublin (10)
- All-time series: Dublin 10–3 Galway
- Largest victory: 9 points Dublin 1-24 – 2-12 Galway; 2018 All-Ireland semi-final (11 August 2018)

The Dublin–Galway rivalry is a Gaelic football rivalry between Irish county teams Dublin and Galway, who first played each other in 1902. Dublin's home ground is Parnell Park and Galway's home ground is Pearse Stadium, however, all but one of their championship meetings have been held at neutral venues, usually Croke Park.

With Galway having the highest number of Connacht titles and Dublin the standard bearers in Leinster, they have both enjoyed success in the All-Ireland level. Dublin and Galway have the second and third highest number of All-Ireland titles to their names respectively.

The teams have faced each other in the final on multiple occasions, with their first ever meeting coming in the 1922 final. They next met in the semi-final of the 1933 Championship, with Galway emerging victorious in Mullingar's Cusack Park. The following year's final saw the two meet again, with Galway coming out on top. The two sides next met in further finals over the following decades, facing off in 1942, 1963 and 1974 with Dublin victorious on each occasion.

The rivalry reached its nadir in the 1983 final, also known as the "Game of Shame" which was infamous for its levels of thuggery, seeing four red cards, as Dublin won by two points. The game has been described as "sour and violent" with a "poisonous atmosphere" in the crowd. They did not meet in the Championship again for 35 years, and when the teams next faced each other in the All-Ireland semi-final in 2018, Dublin emerged victorious before marching on to secure their fourth All-Ireland title in a row.

Galway ended a 90-year wait for a victory over Dublin in 2024 with a one point win over the reigning champions in the quarter final. Despite losing their captain Seán Kelly and all-star forward Shane Walsh to injuries, Galway took the lead with two minutes remaining and held on for a famous win. This Galway win reinvigorated the rivalry and the teams would meet again the following year in Salthill. This time Dublin edged it with a one point win. The two sides would meet for the third year in a row in the 2016 All-Ireland quarter-final when Dublin emerged the victors by a 4 point margin, 1-25 to 1-21

== Senior results ==
=== Legend ===
Dublin win
Galway win
Match was a draw

=== Championship ===
Dublin vs Galway
Date	Venue	Score	Competition
7 October 1923	Croke Park, Dublin	0-6 – 0-4	All-Ireland Final
20 August 1933	Cusack Park, Mullingar	0-8 – 1-4	All-Ireland Semi-Final
23 September 1934	Croke Park, Dublin	3-5 – 1-9	All-Ireland Final
20 September 1942	Croke Park, Dublin	1-10 – 1-8	All-Ireland Final
17 August 1958	Croke Park, Dublin	2-7 – 1-9	All-Ireland Semi-Final
22 September 1963	Croke Park, Dublin	1-9 – 0-10	All-Ireland Final
22 September 1974	Croke Park, Dublin	0-14 – 1-6	All-Ireland Final
29 August 1976	Croke Park, Dublin	1-8 – 0-8	All-Ireland Semi-Final
18 September 1983	Croke Park, Dublin	1-10 – 1-8	All-Ireland Final
11 August 2018	Croke Park, Dublin	1-24 – 2-12	All-Ireland Semi-Final
29 June 2024	Croke Park, Dublin	0-17 – 0-16	All-Ireland Quarter-Final
17 May 2025	Pearse Stadium, Galway	1-18 – 2-14	Round Robin Stage
28 June 2026	Pearse Stadium, Galway	1-25 – 1-21	All-Ireland Quarter-Final
