= 1925 All-Ireland Senior Football Championship final =

1925 Central Council Tournament
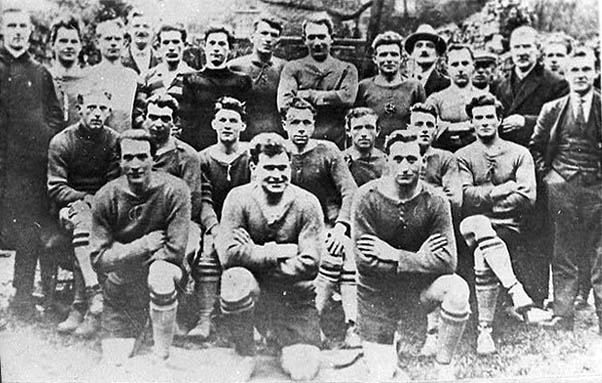
- Galway, champions
- Event: 1925 Central Council Tournament
Galway	Cavan
3–2 (11)	1–2 (5)
- Date: 10 January 1926
- Venue: Croke Park, Dublin

There was no All-Ireland Senior Football Championship final in 1925. The 1925 All-Ireland Senior Football Championship ended in chaos, with first Mayo, and then Galway being proclaimed champions after Kerry and Cavan were disqualified. Instead, a new inter-provincial tournament was organised by the GAA Central Council, of which the final was played between Galway and Cavan on 10 January 1926.

Galway were under pressure to cement their All-Ireland SFC title, and soothe the dissatisfaction over the manner of their claiming it.

== Match ==
=== Summary ===
Galway won the match by two clear goals, 3–2 to 1–2. It was their first ever All-Ireland SFC title, and it followed two previous losing appearances in the final (a loss to Kildare in 1919 and a loss to Dublin in 1922). The GAA lists this match as the 1925 All-Ireland Final on its website, though it was the final of a distinct and separate tournament.

=== Details ===
10 January 1926
Final

Galway	3–2 – 1–2	Cavan

Croke Park, Dublin

==== Galway ====
- Michael Walsh (c)
- Tom Molloy
- John Egan
- Denis Egan
- Harry Burke
- Frank Benson
- Willie Smith
- Tom Leetch
- Mick Bannerton
- Leonard McGrath
- Paddy Roche
- Gilbey Jennings
- Paddy Ganley
- Lar McGrath
- Michael Donnellan

== Legacy ==
2025 marked the 100th anniversary of the event - celebrations will take place in January 2026.
