= Brendan McLoughlin =

Irish hurler

Personal information
- Native name: Breandán Mac Lochlainn (Irish)
- Born: Dublin, Ireland

Sport
- Sport: Hurling
- Position: Goalkeeper / midfield
Club
- Years: Club
- 1993–2019: O'Tooles
Club titles
- Dublin titles: 4
Inter-county
- Years: County
- 1995–2006: Dublin
Inter-county titles
- Leinster titles: 0

Brendan McLoughlin (Irish: Breandán Mac Lochlainn) is an Irish former hurler and Gaelic footballer who played as a goalkeeper and midfielder at senior level for O'Tooles and the Dublin county team.

== Hurling career ==
=== Club ===
At club level, McLoughlin was a dual player with O'Tooles GAA club and played in the Dublin Senior Hurling Championship and the Dublin Senior Football Championship.

He is a winner of four senior hurling championships in 1995, 1996, 1997 and 2002.

=== County ===
McLoughlin was a member of the Dublin senior hurling team from 1995 to 2006. He was a contributor to the Last Man Standing: Hurling Goalkeepers book by Christy O'Connor. McLoughlin has acted as an analyst for the Dublin senior hurling team.

== Honours ==
O'Tooles

- Dublin Senior Hurling Championship:
  - (gold) Winners (4): 1995, 1996, 1997, 2002
  - (silver) Runners-up (1): 2011
- Dublin Senior Hurling League:
  - Winners (1): 2006

Individual

- Dublin Hurler of the Year: 2000
