= Chris Stynes =

American baseball player (born 1973)

- Third baseman / Second baseman / Left fielder
- Born: January 19, 1973 (age 53); Queens, New York, U.S.
- Batted: Right Threw: Right

MLB debut
- May 19, 1995, for the Kansas City Royals

Last MLB appearance
- July 30, 2004, for the Pittsburgh Pirates

MLB statistics
- Batting average: .275
- Home runs: 51
- Runs batted in: 265
- Stats at Baseball Reference

Teams
- Kansas City Royals (1995–1996); Cincinnati Reds (1997–2000); Boston Red Sox (2001); Chicago Cubs (2002); Colorado Rockies (2003); Pittsburgh Pirates (2004)

Christopher Desmond Stynes (born January 19, 1973) is an American former Major League Baseball utility player.

== Early life ==
Christopher Desmond Stynes was born in Queens, New York, and attended Boca Raton Community High School in Florida. He attended Florida Atlantic University.

His grandfather Joe Stynes won the 1923 All-Ireland Senior Football Championship; his cousin Jim Stynes was a legend for the Melbourne Football Club in the Australian Football League.

== Career ==
Among the Minor League Baseball teams that he played for was the Knoxville Smokies.

He played in the majors from 1995 to 2004 for the Kansas City Royals, Cincinnati Reds, Chicago Cubs, Boston Red Sox, Colorado Rockies, Pittsburgh Pirates, and Baltimore Orioles.

Noted for his base-running speed, he managed to steal 3 consecutive bases in a single inning (second, third and then home-plate) while a member of the Kansas City Royals on May 12, 1996, during an 8–5 win against the Seattle Mariners.

In the 1997 season, Stynes had 7 hits in his first 7 at bats, setting an MLB record for most consecutive hits to start a season. The record was broken in 2021 by Yermín Mercedes, who went 8-for-8 to start the 2021 season.

Stynes missed nearly a month of play during the 2001 season after a pitch from Aaron Sele hit Stynes in the cheek, breaking the cheekbone in two places.
