= Paddy Kirwan =

Paddy Kirwan may refer to:

- Paddy Kirwan (hurler), Irish hurler
- Paddy Kirwan (Gaelic footballer) (1899–1963), Irish Gaelic footballer
