= Joe Synnott =

Irish Gaelic footballer

Personal information
- Native name: Seosamh Sionóid (Irish)
- Nickname: Josie
- Born: 22 September 1893 Sheriff Street, Dublin, Ireland
- Died: 14 August 1952 (aged 58) Jervis Street, Dublin, Ireland
- Occupation: Coal merchant

Sport
- Sport: Gaelic football
Club
- Years: Club
- O'Tooles
Club titles
- Dublin titles: 9
Inter-county
- Years: County
- 1919–1928: Dublin
Inter-county titles
- Leinster titles: 5
- All-Irelands: 3

Joseph Synnott (22 September 1893 – 14 August 1952) was an Irish Gaelic footballer. His championship career at senior level with the Dublin county team spanned ten seasons from 1919 until 1928.

Synnott first played competitive football during a golden age for the O'Tooles club. In ten years from 1918 until 1928 he won nine county senior championship medals with the club.

Success at club level saw Synnott join the Dublin senior team and he made his debut during the 1919 championship. Over the course of the next decade he had much success and won three successive All-Ireland medals between 1921 and 1923. He also won five Leinster medals.

Synnott's brothers, John and Peter Synnott, also played with Dublin.

== Honours ==
O'Tooles

- Dublin Senior Football Championship (9): 1918, 1919, 1920, 1922, 1923, 1924, 1925, 1926, 1928

Dublin

- All-Ireland Senior Football Championship (3): 1921, 1922, 1923
- Leinster Senior Football Championship (5): 1920, 1921, 1922, 1923, 1924
