= Ger O'Meara =

Irish hurler and Gaelic footballer

Personal information
- Native name: Gearóid Ó Meára (Irish)
- Born: 1985 (age 40–41) Dublin, Ireland

Sport
- Sport: Hurling
- Position: Right Corner Back
Club
- Years: Club
- 2002 - Present: O'Tooles
Club titles
- Dublin titles: 1
Inter-county
- Years: County
- Dublin
Inter-county titles
- NHL: 1

Ger O'Meara is an inter-county hurler and Gaelic footballer for O'Tooles and Dublin.

== Career ==
=== O'Tooles ===
He plays his club hurling for O'Tooles and plays anywhere across the back line or midfield. He won a Dublin Senior Hurling Championship in 2002 and a Dublin Senior Hurling League in 2006.

He received a Dublin Hurling Blue Star award for his performances for O'Tooles in 2004 and 2014.

=== Dublin ===
O'Meara had previously opted out of the Dublin Senior Hurling squad due to a call up to the senior football panel by manager Paul Caffrey, although he made his return to play for Dublin's hurling team for the All-Ireland Group B clash against Offaly in 2006. O'Meara played a valuable part in Dublin's hurling relegation clash with Westmeath which retained Dublin's Liam MacCarthy Cup status for 2007. O'Meara played in the 2006 Leinster Under-21 Hurling Championship final for Dublin, finishing on the losing team against Kilkenny in Nowlan Park.

== Honours ==
=== O'Tooles ===
Dublin Senior Hurling Championship (1): 2002

Dublin Senior Hurling League (1): 2006

Dublin Under 21 Hurling Championship: 2004

Dublin Under 21 Division 1 Hurling League (1):

Dublin Under-21 Division 1 Football League (1):

=== County ===
Leinster Minor Football Championship (1): 2003 (c)

=== Individual ===
Dublin Blue Stars (1): 2004
