= Paddy Carey =

Irish Gaelic footballer

Personal information
- Native name: Pádraig Ó Ciara (Irish)

Sport
- Sport: Gaelic football
Club
- Years: Club
- O'Tooles
Club titles
- Dublin titles: 10
Inter-county
- Years: County
- 1919-1928: Dublin
Inter-county titles
- Leinster titles: 5
- All-Irelands: 3

Patrick Carey was an Irish Gaelic footballer. His championship career at senior level with the Dublin county team spanned ten seasons from 1919 until 1928.

Carey first played competitive football during a golden age for the O'Tooles club. In ten years from 1918 until 1928 he won nine county senior championship medals with the club before adding a tenth in 1931.

Success at club level saw Carey join the Dublin senior team and he made his debut during the 1919 championship. Over the course of the next decade he enjoyed much success and won three successive All-Ireland medals between 1921 and 1923. He also won five Leinster medals.

== Honours ==
O'Tooles

- Dublin Senior Football Championship (10): 1918, 1919, 1920, 1922, 1923, 1924, 1925, 1926, 1928, 1931

Dublin

- All-Ireland Senior Football Championship (3): 1921, 1922 (c), 1923
- Leinster Senior Football Championship (5): 1920, 1921, 1922 (c), 1923, 1924

Sporting positions
Preceded by	Dublin Senior Football Captain; 1919-1920	Succeeded by Alec Balmain
Preceded by Eddie Carroll	Dublin Senior Football Captain; 1922	Succeeded by Paddy McDonnell
Achievements
Preceded by Eddie Carroll	All-Ireland Senior Football Final winning captain 1922	Succeeded by Paddy McDonnell
