= Paddy McDonnell =

Irish Gaelic footballer

Personal information
- Native name: Pádraig Mac Dónaill (Irish)
- Nickname: Macker
- Born: Patrick Joseph McDonald; 29 April 1895 North Strand, Dublin, Ireland
- Died: 18 July 1977 (aged 82) Fairview, Dublin, Ireland
- Occupation: Sweepstakes official
- Height: 6 ft 3 in (191 cm)

Sport
- Sport: Gaelic football
Club
- Years: Club
- O'Tooles
Club titles
- Dublin titles: 10
Inter-county
- Years: County
- 1919-1932: Dublin
Inter-county titles
- Leinster titles: 6
- All-Irelands: 3

Patrick Joseph McDonnell (29 April 1895 – 18 July 1977) was a Gaelic footballer and Gaelic games administrator. At club level, he played with O'Tooles and also lined out at inter-county level with Dublin.

== Career ==
McDonnell first played competitive football during a golden age for the O'Tooles club. In ten years from 1918 until 1928 he won nine county senior championship medals with the club before adding a tenth in 1931.

Success at club level saw McDonnell join the Dublin senior team and he made his debut during the 1919 championship. Over the course of the next decade he had much success and won three successive All-Ireland medals between 1921 and 1923, albeit his first medal was as a non-playing substitute. He also won six Leinster medals.

His brother, Johnny McDonnell, was also an All-Ireland medal winner with Dublin.

== Honours ==
O'Tooles

- Dublin Senior Football Championship: 1918, 1919, 1920, 1922, 1923, 1924, 1925, 1926, 1928, 1931

Dublin

- All-Ireland Senior Football Championship: 1921, 1922, 1923
- Leinster Senior Football Championship: 1920, 1921, 1922, 1923, 1924, 1932
- All-Ireland Junior Football Championship: 1916
- Leinster Junior Football Championship: 1916

Leinster

- Railway Cup: 1928, 1929, 1930

Sporting positions
Preceded by	Dublin Senior Football Captain; 1919-1920	Succeeded by Alec Balmain
Preceded by Paddy Carey	Dublin Senior Football Captain; 1923-1924	Succeeded by
Achievements
Preceded by Paddy Carey	All-Ireland Senior Football Final winning captain 1923	Succeeded by Phil O'Sullivan
