= Jim Smith (Cavan Gaelic footballer) =

Cavan Gaelic footballer

Personal information
- Native name: Séamus Mac Gabhann (Irish)
- Born: 7 May 1901 Killinkere, County Cavan, Ireland
- Died: 20 July 1970 (aged 69) Stoneybatter, Dublin, Ireland
- Occupation: Garda Síochána
- Height: 6 ft 1 in (185 cm)

Sport
- Sport: Gaelic football
- Position: Centre-back
Clubs
- Years: Club
- Virginia Blues; Garda
Club titles
- Cavan titles: 1
Inter-county
- Years: County
- 1918–1937: Cavan
Inter-county titles
- Ulster titles: 13
- All-Irelands: 2

James Smith (7 May 1901 – 20 July 1970) was an Irish Gaelic footballer. His championship career at senior level with the Cavan county team spanned nineteen years from 1918 until 1937.

== Honours ==
Virginia Blues

- Cavan Senior Football Championship (1): 1919

Cavan

- All-Ireland Senior Football Championship (2): 1933, 1935

Achievements
| Preceded by Joe Barrett (Kerry) | All-Ireland SFC winning captain 1933 | Succeeded by Mick Higgins (Galway) |
