= Michael Carton =

Mick Carton
Personal information
- Native name: Micheál Mac Artáin (Irish)
- Born: 4 September 1984 (age 42) Dublin, Ireland
- Occupation: Firefighter
- Height: 1.85 m (6 ft 1 in)

Sport
- Sport: Hurling
- Position: Left wing-back
Clubs
- Years: Club
- 2001-2019 2019-Present: O'Tooles; St. Peter’s, Dunboyne
Club titles
- Dublin titles: 1
Inter-county*
Years	County	Apps (scores)
2003-present	Dublin	48 (2-17)
Inter-county titles
- Leinster titles: 1
- All-Irelands: 0
- NHL: 1
- All Stars: 0
- *Inter County team apps and scores correct as of 10:14, 8 July 2015.

Mick Carton (born 4 September 1984) is an Irish hurler who played as a left wing-back with the Dublin senior team.

== Biography ==
Born in Dublin, Carton first played competitive hurling during his schooling at St Declan's College. He arrived on the inter-county scene at the age of sixteen when he first linked up with the Dublin minor team, before later joining the under-21 side. He made his senior debut during the 2003 championship. Carton immediately became a regular member of the starting fifteen and won one Leinster medal and one National Hurling League medal.

As a member of the Leinster inter-provincial on a number of occasions, Carton won one Leinster medal. At club level he is a one-time championship medallist with O'Tooles.

His father, Peadar Carton Snr, and his brother, Peadar Carton Jnr, also played for Dublin.

Throughout his career Carton made 49 championship appearances. He quit the Dublin panel on 8 July 2015.

On 14 March 2020, he announced that he tested positive for COVID-19. He became active in advising the public on maintaining social distancing. He admitted that, though he had no underlying medical conditions, he was struggling with the virus. He later recovered.

== Honours ==
=== Player ===
O'Toole's

- Dublin Senior Hurling Championship (1): 2002

Dublin

- Leinster Senior Hurling Championship (1): 2013
- National League (Division 1) (1): 2011
- National League (Division 2) (1): 2006

Leinster

- Railway Cup (1): 2014
