= Liam Ryan (Dublin hurler) =

Irish hurler

Personal information
- Native name: Liam Ó Riain (Irish)
- Born: 1 January 1978 (age 48) Dublin, Ireland
- Occupation: Teacher

Sport
- Sport: Hurling
- Position: Full Forward
Club
- Years: Club
- O'Tooles
Inter-county
- Years: County
- Dublin
Inter-county titles
- NHL: 1

Liam Ryan (born 1 January 1978) is a former hurler with the Dublin senior team and O'Tooles GAC. Ryan retired from intercounty hurling prior to the commencement of the 2012 National hurling league.
