= Peadar Carton =

Irish hurler

Personal information
- Native name: Peadar Mac Artáin (Irish)
- Born: 2 April 1986 (age 40) Dublin, Ireland
- Occupation: Carpenter

Sport
- Sport: Hurling
- Position: Right corner forward
Club
- Years: Club
- 2003-: O'Tooles
Inter-county
- Years: County
- Dublin

Peadar Carton (born 2 April 1986) is a hurler who plays inter-county senior hurling for Dublin and for his club O'Tooles. His brother Michael also hurls for Dublin and O'Tooles.

Peadar scored 1-2 for Dublin U21s in the Leinster final victory over Offaly at Parnell Park in July 2007

== Honours ==
- Leinster Under-21 Hurling Championship (1): 2007
