= Toddy Pierse =

Irish Gaelic footballer

Personal information
- Native name: Tomás Mac Piarais (Irish)
- Nickname: Toddy
- Born: 21 July 1898 Wexford, Ireland
- Died: 11 October 1968 (aged 70) Wexford, Ireland
- Occupation: Medical doctor

Sport
- Sport: Gaelic football
College
- Years: College
- University College Dublin
College titles
- Sigerson titles: 2
Inter-county
- Years: County
- 1918–1920 1921–1922 1923–1924: Wexford; Dublin; Wexford
Inter-county titles
- Leinster titles: 3
- All-Irelands: 3

Thomas Edward "Toddy" Pierse (21 July 1898 – 11 October 1968) was an Irish Gaelic footballer. His championship career at senior level with the Wexford and Dublin county teams spanned seven seasons from 1918 until 1924.

Pierse first played competitive football on the inter-county scene as a member of the Wexford senior team in 1918. He won an All-Ireland SFC medal that year, as Wexford won a record fourth successive championship. In 1921, Pierse joined the Dublin senior team and went on to win back-to-back All-Ireland SFC medals in 1921 and 1922. He also won three Leinster SFC medals. Pierse ended his career back with the Wexford team in 1924.

== Honours ==
University College Dublin

- Sigerson Cup (2): 1920 (c), 1924

Wexford

- All-Ireland Senior Football Championship (1): 1918
- Leinster Senior Football Championship (1): 1918

Dublin

- All-Ireland Senior Football Championship (2): 1921, 1922
- Leinster Senior Football Championship (2): 1921, 1922
