= Peter Synnott =

Irish Gaelic footballer (1903–?)

Personal information
- Native name: Peadar Sionóid (Irish)
- Born: 26 May 1903 Sheriff Street, Dublin, Ireland

Sport
- Sport: Gaelic football
Club
- Years: Club
- O'Tooles
Inter-county
- Years: County
- 1932-1933: Dublin
Inter-county titles
- Leinster titles: 2
- All-Irelands: 0

Peter Synnott (born 26 May 1903) was an Irish Gaelic footballer. His championship career at senior level with the Dublin county team lasted two seasons from 1932 until 1933.

Synnott first played competitive football during a golden age for the O'Tooles club. During his playing days he won several county senior championship medals.

Success at club level saw Synnott join the Dublin senior team and he made his debut during the 1932 championship. Over the next few years he had much success and won back-to-back Leinster medals.

Synnott's brothers, John and Joe Synnott, also played with Dublin.

== Honours ==
Dublin

- Leinster Senior Football Championship (2): 1932, 1933
