= Frank Conlan =

Irish Gaelic footballer

Frank "Joyce" Conlan
Personal information
- Native name: Prionsias Ó Conalláin (Irish)
- Nickname: Joyce
- Born: 4 July 1883 Newbridge, County Kildare, Ireland
- Died: 28 February 1953 (aged 69) Newbridge, County Kildare, Ireland
- Occupation: Weighmaster

Sport
- Sport: Gaelic football
- Position: Left corner-forward
Club
- Years: Club
- Roseberry
Club titles
- Kildare titles: 9
Inter-county
- Years: County
- 1903-1921: Kildare
Inter-county titles
- Leinster titles: 3
- All-Irelands: 2

Francis Conlan (4 July 1883 – 28 February 1953) was an Irish Gaelic footballer who played as a left corner-forward for the Kildare senior team.

Regarded as one of Kildare's greatest-ever players, Conlan made his first appearance for the team during the 1903 championship and was a regular member of the starting fifteen until his retirement after the 1921 championship. During that time he won two All-Ireland medals and three Leinster medals. Conlan was an All-Ireland runner-up on one occasion.

At club level, Conlan played with Roseberry, winning nine county club championship medals.
