= Jack O'Reilly (Gaelic footballer) =

Irish Gaelic footballer

Personal information
- Native name: Seán Ó Raghallaigh (Irish)
- Nickname: Stonewall
- Born: 7 October 1896 North Wall, Dublin, Ireland
- Died: 18 March 1942 (aged 45) Arbour Hill, Dublin, Ireland
- Occupation: Army officer

Sport
- Sport: Gaelic football
Club
- Years: Club
- O'Tooles
Club titles
- Dublin titles: 9
Inter-county
- Years: County
- 1918-1928: Dublin
Inter-county titles
- Leinster titles: 4
- All-Irelands: 3

John James O'Reilly (7 October 1896 - 18 March 1942) was an Irish Gaelic footballer. His championship career at senior level with the Dublin county team spanned eleven seasons from 1919 until 1929.

Born in the North Wall area of Dublin, O'Reilly was the youngest of three sons born to John and Kate O'Reilly (née Hackett). He was educated locally and later worked as a van boy before joining the Irish Army.

O'Reilly first played competitive football with O'Tooles GAA club. In ten years, from 1918 until 1928, he won nine Dublin Senior Football Championship medals with the club.

Success at club level saw O'Reilly join the Dublin senior team and he made his debut during the 1918 championship. Over the course of the next decade, he won three successive All-Ireland Senior Football medals between 1921 and 1923. He also won four Leinster medals.

== Honours ==
O'Tooles

- Dublin Senior Football Championship (9): 1918, 1919, 1920, 1922, 1923, 1924, 1925, 1926, 1928

Dublin

- All-Ireland Senior Football Championship (3): 1921, 1922, 1923
- Leinster Senior Football Championship (4): 1921, 1922, 1923, 1924
