= Frank Burke (dual player) =

Irish Gaelic footballer

Personal information
- Native name: Proinsias de Búrca (Irish)
- Nickname: Fergus
- Born: James Francis Burke; 8 April 1895 Carbury, County Kildare, Ireland
- Died: 28 December 1987 (aged 92) Rathfarnham, Dublin, Ireland
- Occupation: Secondary school teacher

Sport
- Football Position: Forward
- Hurling Position: Forward
Club
- Years: Club
- Collegians
Club titles
	Football	Hurling
Dublin titles	0	3
College
- Years: College
- 1915–1924: University College Dublin
College titles
- Sigerson titles: 4
- Fitzgibbon titles: 5
Inter-county
- Years: County
- 1917–1927: Dublin
Inter-county titles
	Football	Hurling
Leinster Titles	5	4
All-Ireland Titles	3	2

James Francis Burke (8 April 1895 – 28 December 1987) was an Irish hurler, Gaelic footballer and revolutionary. His championship career as a dual player with the Dublin senior teams spanned ten years from 1917 until 1927.

Born in Carbury, County Kildare, Burke was educated locally before later boarding at St. Enda's School in Dublin. Under the influence of Patrick Pearse he joined the Irish Republican Brotherhood and was a founder-member of the Irish Volunteers in 1913. During the 1916 Easter Rising Burke was stationed in the General Post Office before later manning a barricade on Moore Street. His sister, Aoife de Búrca was a nurse in the GPO while he was there. After a period of internment in Stafford and Frongoch he returned to Dublin where he took over as headmaster of St. Enda's School.

Burke enjoyed his first successes in competitive hurling in St Enda's, where he was captain of Sgoil Éanna's Junior Hurlers, leaders of Dublin Minor League, Division B, aged 15, and also captain of the Junior Footballers, who won the Schools Football Championship and was a star handball player. He then won a scholarship to the National University, as did fellow-pupils Denis Gwynn and Donal O'Connor.

He continued his success in hurling and football during his studies at University College Dublin. A regular on the university's inter-varsities team he won five Sigerson Cup medals and four Fitzgibbon Cup medals between 1915 and 1924.

At club level Burke played with the Colegians team. As a hurler he won three successive county senior championship medals from 1917 to 1919.

Burke made his debut on the inter-county scene in 1914 when he was selected for the Dublin junior team. He won an All-Ireland medal that year before collecting a second in 1916. Burke subsequently joined the Dublin senior teams in both codes, making his debut in 1917. Over the course of the next decade he became one of the greatest and most successful dual players of all time, winning All-Ireland medals as a hurler in 1917 and 1920 before collecting three successive All-Ireland medals as a footballer from 1921 to 1923. Burke also won a total of nine Leinster medals. He played his last game for Dublin during the 1927 championship.

== Honours ==
University College Dublin

- Fitzgibbon Cup (4): 1915, 1916, 1917, 1924,
- Sigerson Cup (5): 1915, 1917, 1918, 1920, 1924,

Collegians

- Dublin Senior Hurling Championship (3): 1917, 1918, 1919

Dublin

- All-Ireland Senior Football Championship (3): 1921, 1922, 1923
- All-Ireland Senior Hurling Championship (2): 1917, 1920
- Leinster Senior Football Championship (5): 1920, 1921, 1922, 1923, 1924
- Leinster Senior Hurling Championship (4): 1917, 1919, 1920, 1921
- All-Ireland Junior Football Championship (2): 1914, 1916
- Leinster Junior Football Championship (2): 1914, 1916
