= Phil O'Sullivan =

Irish Gaelic footballer

Personal information
- Native name: Pilib Ó Súilleabháin (Irish)
- Nickname: The Master
- Born: 10 May 1895 Tuosist, County Kerry, Ireland
- Died: August 1952 (aged 57) New York City, United States
- Occupation: Teacher

Sport
- Sport: Gaelic football
- Position: Right corner-back
Clubs
- Years: Club
- Lauragh; Kenmare; Faughs; Ballymacelligott
Club titles
- Kerry titles: 1
College
- Years: College
- University College Dublin
Inter-county
- Years: County
- 1923-1927: Kerry
Inter-county titles
- Munster titles: 4
- All-Irelands: 2
- NFL: 0

Philip O'Sullivan (10 May 1895 – August 1952) was an Irish Gaelic footballer who played for a number of clubs in Kerry and Dublin and at inter-county level with the Kerry senior football team. He usually lined out as a defender.

== Career ==
As a Gaelic footballer, hurler and athlete, O'Sullivan played his football with Lauragh and hurling with Kenmare. While a student in Dublin, he played with Faughs and University College Dublin and later when he took up a teaching post in Ballymacelligott he played with the local team. O'Sullivan first appeared on the inter-county scene as a member of the Kerry junior football team that won the All-Ireland Junior Championship title in 1915. He was subsequently promoted to the senior team and, after being on the losing side to Dublin in the 1923 All-Ireland final, captained the team to the All-Ireland Senior Championship title the following year. O'Sullivan claimed a second winners' medal in 1926 and also won four Munster Championship titles during his brief senior career.

== Personal life and death ==
Born in Tuosist, County Kerry, O'Sullivan worked as a national school teacher. In 1927 he travelled with the Kerry team to New York City where he met and later married Kathleen O'Mahoney. O'Sullivan spent the remainder of his life in New York.

O'Sullivan died in August 1952 and is buried in Calvary Cemetery in Queens.

== Honours ==
Ballymacelligott

- Kerry Senior Football Championship: 1918

Kerry

- All-Ireland Senior Football Championship: 1924 (c), 1926
- Munster Senior Football Championship: 1923, 1924 (c), 1926, 1927
- All-Ireland Junior Football Championship: 1915
- Munster Junior Football Championship: 1914, 1915

Sporting positions
Preceded by John O'Mahony	Kerry senior football team captain 1923-1924	Succeeded by Tom O'Mahony
Achievements
Preceded by Paddy McDonnell	All-Ireland Senior Football Final winning captain 1924	Succeeded by Michael Walsh
