= Frank Benson (footballer) =

Irish Gaelic footballer

Personal information
- Native name: Proinsias Mac Giolla Dé (Irish)
- Born: 1 March 1898 Keash, County Sligo, Ireland
- Died: 10 December 1981 (aged 83) Dublin, Ireland

Sport
- Sport: Gaelic football
Inter-county
- Years: County
- Galway
Inter-county titles
- All-Irelands: 1

Francis Benson (1 March 1898 – 10 December 1981) was an Irish Gaelic footballer. He won an All-Ireland medal with the Galway senior team in 1925.

== Honours ==
Galway

- All-Ireland Senior Football Championship (1): 1925
