= O'Tooles GAA =

Gaelic games club in County Dublin, Ireland

O'Tooles GAC
- Cumann Uí Thuathail
- Founded: 1901
- County: Dublin
- Nickname: The Larriers
- Colours: Green and White
- Grounds: An Pairc Ui Thuthail, Ayrfield
- Coordinates: 53°23′52.41″N 6°11′04.43″W

Playing kits
Home Kit	Change Kit

Senior Club Championships
	All Ireland	Leinster champions	Dublin champions
Football:	0	0	11
Hurling:	0	0	8

O'Tooles GAC (Irish: Cumann Uí Thuathail) is a Gaelic Athletic Association club based in Ayrfield, Dublin, Ireland, formed in 1901. The club originally served Dublin’s north inner city from their base at 100 Seville Place. They have won multiple Dublin Senior Championships; produced All-Ireland winning captains; and an O'Tooles selection took to the pitch against Tipperary on Bloody Sunday in 1920.

== History ==
=== Early years ===
O'Tooles GAC was formed in 1901 at 100 Seville Place in the inner north of the city of Dublin from the Gaelic League branch. The Gaelic League branch held their inaugural meeting in February 1901. Francis Cahill was one of the founding members of the club and Brother J.A. O'Mahoney, who was superior of O'Connell School was elected as the first president.

On Thursday 8 October 1901, after Irish classes, the club's first hurling team was formed. The captain of the team was Edward Keegan, with Thomas Keegan elected as secretary and John Taylor as treasurer. In 1905, captained by Tim O'Neill, the club won their first competition, the Saturday Junior Hurling League.

August 1902 brought about the formation of the football team, with the clubs first major success arriving in 1910 in the form of the minor league.

In 1910, the St. Laurence O'Toole Pipe Band was formed with Tom Clarke elected president and playwright Seán O'Casey elected secretary.

=== Easter Rising ===
On the morning of Monday 24 April 1916, around 1,200 members of the Irish Volunteers and Irish Citizen Army arrived at a number of locations in Dublin. Among them were over 70 members of the O'Tooles club including two executed leaders, Tom Clarke (3 May) and Seán Mac Diarmada (12 May). Others involved included Liam Ó Briain, future TD and a professor of languages. Frank Robbins, future President of the Dublin Council of Trade Unions and Tom Ennis who was later a Free State Army General.

O'Tooles members who fought in the Easter Rising
G.P.O.	Jacob's	St Stephen's Green	Four Courts	Boland's Mills	South Dublin Union	Ashbourne
David Begley	James Barrett	James Brougham	Dan Begley	Toby Breslin	Edward Keegan	Patrick Birney
Michael Brady	Vinny Byrne	Joseph Connelly	Sean Cody			
Tom Clarke	James Cassells	James Donnelly	Jim Dempsey			
James Redmond	Michael Colgan	Patrick Duffy	Patrick Kelly			
Tom Crimmins	Liam Daly	Joseph Duffy	Bernard Murphy			
Michael Croke	Tom Drumm	Robert Humphreys	Sean O'Moore			
Tom Ennis	James Hannon	Tom Kehoe	Thomas Yourell			
John Fitzharris	James Kenny	James Lawless	Thomas Smart			
Frank Henderson	Thomas Losty	Michael Lawless	John Halpin			
Sean Kerr	Sean Lynch	Johnny McDonald	Charles McMahon			
Thomas Leahy	William Lynch	David O'Leary				
Laurence Mackey	Mick McDonnell	Diarmuid O'Leary				
Michael Mackey	Paddy McDonnell	Tim O'Neill				
Seán Mac Diarmada	Michael Meade	Liam O'Briain				
Patrick Mitchell	Owen Meade	Frank O'Brien				
John O'Neill	James Murran	Willian O'Brien				
Thomas J. Roche	Edward O'Hanrahan	Frank Robbins				
Hugh Thornton	Joseph O'Hanrahan	Sean Rogan				
Frank Thornton	Michael O'Rourke					
Patrick J. Weafer	Sean O'Rourke					
Thomas Wheatley	Kathleen Pollard					
	Josephine Pollard					
	Patrick Rooney					
	James Sheils					
	Denis Shelly					
	Thomas Shelly					
	Jim Slattery					
	Michael Smith					
	Johnny McDonnell					

=== Bloody Sunday ===
On 21 November 1920, Dublin and Tipperary played a football challenge match in Croke Park. As a result of a mass shooting by the British Forces 14 innocent people including one player (Michael Hogan from Tipperary), died. It is estimated that around 60 – 100 people were also injured. O'Tooles have a deep connection with the events of this day as they contributed 12 players to the Dublin team with 9 players starting.

Dublin
Number	Position	Name
1	Goalkeeper	Johnny McDonnell
3	Full back	Paddy Carey
4	Left corner back	William Robbins
5	Right half back	John Synnott
7	Left half back	Jack O'Reilly
11	Centre forward	Paddy McDonnell (c)
12	Left half forward	John Carey
13	Right corner forward	Joe Synnott
14	Full forward	Stephen Synnott

Substitutes: Tom Carey, Joe Norris & Tom Fitzgerald

== Football ==
An amalgamation of O'Tooles and another local club Emeralds brought the golden age of football to the Seville Place club. The 1916 Dublin Intermediate Football Championship which was played in 1917 due to the number of players interned after the 1916 Rising heralded the beginning of the club's most successful football teams.

From 1918 to 1931, O'Tooles won 10 Dublin Senior Football Championship titles and produced the county's first five-in-a-row club team. During this period the club also contributed the majority of players to All-Ireland Senior Football Championship winning Dublin teams, including producing All-Ireland winning captains in Paddy Carey and Paddy McDonnell.

Year	Winners	Runners-up
1946	O'Tooles	Parnells
1931	O'Tooles	Erin's Hope
1928	O'Tooles	O'Dwyers
1926	O'Tooles	Garda
1925	O'Tooles	Kickhams
1924	O'Tooles	UCD
1923	O'Tooles	Garda
1922	O'Tooles	St. Mary's
1920	O'Tooles	Kickhams
1919	O'Tooles	McCrackens
1918	O'Tooles	Collegians

== Hurling ==
A Dublin Intermediate Hurling Championship was won 1956 and 1961 with a Dublin Junior Hurling Championship arriving in 1982. In 1969, O'Tooles made the breakthrough and won their first Dublin Senior Hurling Championship. Further success was achieved in 1977, 1984 and 1990.

During the 1990s, O'Tooles who three county titles in a row in 1995, 1996 and 1997 and reached the Leinster Senior Club Hurling Championship final in 1996.

In 2002, O'Tooles defeated north side rivals and defending champions Craobh Chiaráin after a replay on a score line of 1–13 to 2–7.

Year	Winners	Runners-up
2002	O'Tooles	Craobh Chiaráin
1997	O'Tooles	St. Vincents
1996	O'Tooles	Kilmacud Crokes
1995	O'Tooles	St. Vincents
1990	O'Tooles	St. Vincents
1984	O’Tooles	Kilmacud Crokes
1977	O'Tooles	Faughs
1969	O'Tooles	Faughs

== Camogie ==
O'Tooles were affiliated to the Dublin Camogie Leagues in 1911. In 1915, they were top of the league with Kevins, however, the league was not completed. O'Tooles competed in league competitions across the 1910s and '20s. However, by the 1930s their participation had ended. In the early years of the Camogie board, O'Tooles organised an annual Aeridheacht, it involved a match between North Dublin and South Dublin. The club entered teams intermittently, ending in the 1960s. Saint Laurence O Toole G.A.C. 1901-2001: A Centenary History. (p.1282)

In 1995, the Cameron Park Camogie Club which served Ayrfield, Edenmore and Donaghmede merged under the O'Tooles banner and the camogie section in the club was reformed.

The camogie section went into hibernation before being revived in the 2010s through a juvenile section leading to the establishment of an adult team.

== Ladies' football ==
Ladies' football was introduced in the 2000s through the development of an underage section, leading to the adult team winning the Junior D championship in 2011. The Ladies section was paused before being reestablished in the late 2010s, leading to a juvenile section and adult team.

== Present day ==
As of 2027, O'Tooles field two adult hurling teams. Their Senior team compete in the Division 3 league and the Dublin Premier Intermediate Hurling Championship. Their Junior team are in Division 9 and the Junior F Championship.

In football, they also field two teams. Their Senior team are in the Division 4 league and the Dublin Intermediate Football Championship. Their Junior team are in Division 10A and the Junior 6 All-County Championship.

In Camogie they are in Junior 3 in the league and the Junior 3 Championship.

In Ladies' football they are in Division 6 and the Junior E Championship. The club has a Gaelic4Mothers & Others (G4MO) team.

== Honours ==
=== Hurling ===
- Dublin Senior Hurling Championship:
  - (gold) Winners (8): 1969, 1977, 1984, 1990, 1995, 1996, 1997, 2002
  - (silver) Runners-up (5): 1973, 1981, 1982, 1985, 2011
- Dublin Intermediate Hurling Championship:
  - Winners (4): 1917, 1956, 1961, 2026
- Dublin Junior Hurling Championship:
  - Winners (1): 1982
- Dublin Hurling League - Division 1:
  - Winners (9): 1969, 1970, 1979, 1980, 1982, 1983, 1984, 1985, 2006
- Dublin Hurling League - Division 4:
  - Winners (1): 2026
- Dublin Hurling League - Division 10:
  - Winners (1): 2026
- Dublin Under 21 Hurling Championship:
  - Winners (3): 1974, 1981, 2004
- Dublin Under 21D Hurling Championship:
  - Winners (2): 2023, 2025
- Dublin Minor A Hurling Championship:
  - Winners (5): 1911, 1920, 1953, 1975, 1993
- Dublin Féile na nGael - Division 2:
  - Winners (1): 1994
- Dublin Féile na nGael - Division 4:
  - Winners (2): 2016, 2021
- Boland Cup:
  - Winners (8): 1966, 1969, 1970, 1971, 1972, 1990, 1993, 1997
- Smithwicks Cup:
  - Winners (4): 1968, 1969, 1970, 1997

=== Gaelic Football ===
- Dublin Senior Football Championship:
  - (gold) Winners (11): 1918, 1919, 1920, 1922, 1923, 1924, 1925, 1926, 1928, 1931, 1946
  - (silver) Runners-up (6): 1927, 1929, 1930, 1935, 1938, 1964
- Dublin Intermediate Football Championship:
  - Winners (1): 1916
- Dublin Junior Football Championship:
  - Winners (2): 1922, 1945
- Dublin Football League - Division 1:
  - Winners (9): 1918, 1919, 1920, 1921, 1922, 1923, 1924, 1925, 1929
- Dublin Football League - Division 2:
  - Winners (1): 1987
- Dublin Minor A Football Championship:
  - Winners (10): 1911, 1919, 1920, 1921, 1924, 1931, 1933, 1934, 1954, 1957
- Dublin Minor B Football Championship:
  - Winners (1): 2012
- Dublin Minor E Football Championship:
  - Winners (1): 2021

=== Camogie ===
- Dublin Camogie Championship - Senior 4:
  - Winners (1): 1996
- Dublin Camogie Championship - Junior 4:
  - Winners (1): 2026
- Dublin Camogie Championship - Junior 6:
  - Winners (1): 2025
- Dublin Camogie League - Junior 4:
  - Winners (1): 2026
- Dublin Camogie Féile - Division 2:
  - Winners (2): 1998, 2000

=== Ladies Football ===
- Dublin LGFA Championship - Junior D:
  - Winners (1): 2011
- Dublin LGFA Championship - Junior G:
  - Winners (1): 2025
- Dublin LGFA Féile - Division 2:
  - Winners (1): 2010
- Dublin LGFA Féile - Division 6:
  - Winners (1): 2019
- Dublin LGFA Féile - Division 8:
  - Winners (1): 2025

== Notable players ==
=== Senior inter-county footballers ===
Dublin

- Paddy Carey, All-Ireland winning captain with Dublin
- Paddy McDonnell, All-Ireland winning captain with Dublin
- Johnny McDonnell, All-Ireland winner with Dublin
- Joe Synnott, All-Ireland winner with Dublin
- John Synnott, All-Ireland winner with Dublin
- Peter Synnott, Leinster Senior Football Championship Winner
- Jack O'Reilly, All-Ireland winner with Dublin
- William Robbins, All-Ireland winner with Dublin
- Joe Stynes, All-Ireland winner with Dublin. Played with Bohemian F.C. Uncle of AFL player Jim Stynes

Kildare & Dublin

- Larry Stanley, All-Ireland winning captain with Kildare & All-Ireland winner with Dublin

Meath & Dublin

- Joe Norris, All-Ireland winner with Dublin

=== Senior inter-county hurlers ===
Dublin

- Ger O'Meara
- Kevin Ryan
- Kevin Flynn - Former Dublin Captain
- Michael Carton - 2013 Leinster Senior Hurling Championship Winner
- Liam Ryan
- Peadar Carton - 2007 Leinster Under-21 Hurling Winner
- Philip Brennan - Former Dublin Captain
- Brendan McLoughlin

Kilkenny & Dublin

- Eamon Morrissey - All-Ireland Senior Hurling Winner
- Jamesie Brennan - All-Ireland Senior Hurling Winner

== Notable members ==
- Francis Cahill - Founding Member and Teachta Dála for Dublin North
- Seán O'Casey - Irish Playwright
- Liam Ó Briain - Irish Language Expert and Easter Rising Veteran
- Tom Clarke - Signatory of the Proclamation of the Irish Republic
- Seán Mac Diarmada - Signatory of the Proclamation of the Irish Republic
- Larry Stanley - High jumper who represented Ireland at the 1924 Summer Olympics
- Frank Robbins - President of the Dublin Council of Trade Unions
- Tom Ennis - Captain of the first O'Tooles team to win the Dublin Senior Football Championship. Stationed at the D.B.C tower in O'Connell Street during the Easter Rising under the orders of James Connolly and Free State Army General
- Edward Keegan - Founding member and first hurling captain. Stationed at the South Dublin Union during the Easter Rising
- Michael O'Hanrahan - second in command of Dublin's 2nd battalion under Commandant Thomas MacDonagh during the Easter Rising
- Con Clarke - Dublin County Board Chairman, O'Tooles Chairman and winner of Senior Hurling Championships as player and manager.
- Jimmy Wren - Club Historian and Dublin Senior Hurling Championship winner in 1969
