= 1916 All-Ireland Junior Football Championship =

All Ireland Champions
- Winners: Dublin (2nd win)
- Captain: James Maguire

All Ireland Runners-up
- Runners-up: Limerick
- Captain: Con Kiely

Provincial Champions
- Munster: Limerick
- Leinster: Dublin
- Ulster: Cavan
- Connacht: Not Played

The 1916 All-Ireland Junior Hurling Championship was the fifth staging of the All-Ireland Junior Championship, the Gaelic Athletic Association's second tier Gaelic football championship.

The All-Ireland final replay was played on 18 November 1917 at Jones's Road in Dublin, between Dublin and Limerick, in what was their first ever championship meeting. Dublin won the match by 6–04 to 0–03 to claim their second championship title overall and a first title in two years.

== Results ==
=== All-Ireland Junior Football Championship ===
==== All-Ireland final ====
16 September 1917 Final	Dublin	1-02 - 1-02	Limerick	Croke Park

18 November 1917 Final replay	Dublin	6-04 - 0-03	Limerick	Croke Park
