= Jeremiah Collins (Gaelic football trainer) =

Irish athlete, Gaelic football trainer and greyhound racing judge

- Born: Jeremiah Michael Collins; 21 August 1882; Farranfore, County Kerry, Ireland
- Died: 29 June 1967 (aged 84); Blackrock, County Dublin, Ireland
- Occupation: Civil servant
- Employer: Kerry County Board
- Known for: Kerry football team trainer

Jeremiah Michael Collins (21 August 1882 – 29 June 1967) was an Irish athlete, Gaelic football trainer and greyhound racing judge.

Born in Farranfore, County Kerry, Collins was born to Michael and Mary Collins (née Brosnan). He was educated locally and later emigrated to England where he worked in the civil service.

An athlete in his youth, Collins returned to Dublin in 1913 and took the role of trainer of the Kerry senior football team. In 1924 he guided the team to the All-Ireland SFC title.
