= Larry Stanley =

Gaelic footballer and athlete

Personal information
- Full name: Laurence Stanley
- Nationality: Irish
- Born: 19 May 1896 Blacktrench, Naas, County Kildare
- Died: 20 September 1987 (aged 91)

Sport
- Country: Ireland
- Sport: Athletics
- Event: High jump

Achievements and titles
- Personal bests: 1.91m (Dublin, 1924)
Medal record
Representing Ireland
Tailteann Games
Silver medal – second place	1924 Dublin	High jump

Larry Stanley
Personal information
- Native name: Labhrás de Stainléigh (Irish)
- Born: 19 May 1896 Blacktrench, Caragh, Naas, County Kildare
- Died: 21 September 1987 (aged 91) Dublin, Ireland
- Occupation: Garda Síochána
- Height: 6 ft 1 in (185 cm)

Sport
- Sport: Gaelic football
- Position: Centre-forward
Clubs
- Years: Club
- Caragh; O'Tooles; Garda
Club titles
- Kildare titles: 2
Inter-county
- Years: County
- 1916-1919 1920-1925 1926-1930: Kildare; Dublin; Kildare
Inter-county titles
- Leinster titles: 3
- All-Irelands: 2
- NFL: 0
- All Stars: 1

Larry Stanley (19 May 1896 – 21 September 1987) was an Irish Gaelic footballer who played at senior level for the Kildare and Dublin county teams.

== Biography ==
Regarded as one of the greatest players of his generation, Stanley made his first appearance on the inter-county scene during the 1916 championship and was a regular member of the starting fifteen for both Kildare and Dublin until his retirement after the 1930 championship. During that time he won two All-Ireland medals and three Leinster medals. Stanley captained Kildare to the All-Ireland title in 1919.

At club level Stanley enjoyed a hugely successful career with Caragh, winning two county club championship. He also played with O'Tooles and the Garda club in Dublin.

Stanley was also a successful high jumper, winning the British AAA Championships title in the high jump event at the 1924 AAA Championships. Shortly afterwards he was selected for the Irish team at the 1924 Summer Olympics in Paris.

In retirement from sport Stanley came to be recognised as one of the greats of Gaelic football. In 1980 he was the inaugural recipient of the All-Time All Star Award. He was posthumously included on a special selection of the greatest Garda football team ever.

Sporting positions
Preceded by	Kildare Senior Football Captain; 1919	Succeeded by Mick Buckley
Achievements
Preceded by Jim Byrne (Wexford)	All-Ireland Senior Football Final winning captain 1919	Succeeded by Jerry Shelly (Tipperary)
Awards
Preceded by Newly created award	All-Time All Star Award; 1980	Succeeded by Tommy Murphy (Laois)
