= Dublin Senior Hurling League =

Annual club hurling competition

Dublin Adult Hurling Leagues (AHL)
- Irish: Sraith Iomána Baile Átha Cliath
- Code: Hurling
- Founded: 1905
- Region: Dublin (GAA)
- No. of teams: AHL 1-10 (12 Teams); AHL 11-12 (10 Teams)
- Title holders: Ballyboden St. Enda's (11th title)
- Most titles: Faughs (28 titles)
- Sponsors: PTSB
- Official website: https://www.dublingaa.ie

The Dublin Adult Hurling Leagues (AHL) (Irish: Sraith Iomána Baile Átha Cliath) (branded as the PTSB Dublin Adult Hurling Leagues) are the annual league competitions organised by the Dublin County Board of the Gaelic Athletic Association for hurling clubs in Dublin.

== Division 1 ==
Year	Winner	Finalist
2026	Ballyboden St. Enda's	
2025	Kilmacud Crokes 1-18	Lucan Sarsfields 0-12
2024	Kilmacud Crokes	Ballyboden St Enda's
2023		
2022		
2021	Na Fianna 0-22	Ballyboden St Enda's 0-17
2020		
2019	Cuala 3-17	Ballyboden St Enda's 0-18
2018	Ballyboden St Enda's 1-14	Na Fianna 1-10
2017	Ballyboden St Enda's 0-23	St Brigid's 1-12
2016	Cuala 0-18	O'Tooles 0-14
2015	Cuala 2-10	O'Tooles 0-09
2014	St Jude's 1-13	Kilmacud Crokes 0-13
2013	Ballyboden St Enda's 3-14	O'Tooles 1-12
2012	Ballyboden St Enda's 0-10	Craobh Chiaráin 0-07
2011	Kilmacud Crokes 0-16	Crumlin 2-08
2010	Craobh Chiaráin	Ballyboden St Enda's
2009	Ballyboden St Enda's 3-10	Lucan Sarsfields 1-09
2008	Craobh Chiaráin 1-12	Crumlin 1-07
2007	Ballyboden St Enda's	
2006	O'Tooles 2-14	St Vincents 0-05
2005		
2004	Ballyboden St Enda's	
2003		
2002	Craobh Chiaráin	
2001	Craobh Chiaráin	
2000		
1999	Ballyboden St Enda's	
1998	Craobh Chiaráin	
1997	Craobh Chiaráin	
1996	Kilmacud Crokes	
1995		
1994	Craobh Chiaráin	
1993	Ballyboden St Enda's	
1992		
1991	Craobh Chiaráin	
1990	Cuala	
1989	Cuala	
1988		
1987	Faughs	
1986	Faughs	
1985	O'Tooles	
1984	O'Tooles	
1983	O'Tooles	
1982	O'Tooles	
1981		
1980	O'Tooles	
1979	O'Tooles	
1978		
1977		
1976	Cuala	
1975		
1974	Craobh Chiaráin	
1973	Faughs	
1972	Craobh Chiaráin	
1971	Faughs	
1970	O'Tooles	
1969	O'Tooles	
1968		
1967		
1966	Faughs	
1965		
1964		
1963		
1962	Faughs	
1961	Faughs	
1960		
1959		
1958		
1957	Civil Service	
1956		
1955		
1954	Kilmacud Crokes	
1953	Faughs	
1952	Faughs	
1951		
1950		
1949		
1948	Faughs	
1947		
1946	Faughs	
1945		
1944	Faughs	
1943		
1942	Faughs	
1941		
1940		
1939	Faughs	
1938	Faughs	
1937	Faughs	
1936		
1935		
1934		
1933		
1932		
1931	Army Metro	
1930	Faughs	
1929	Garda	
1928	Garda	
1927	Faughs	
1926		
1925	Faughs	
1924		
1923		
1922	Faughs	
1921	Faughs	
1920	Faughs	
1919		
1918		
1917		
1916		
1915	Faughs	
1914	Faughs	
1913		
1912		
1911	Faughs	
1910	Faughs	
1906	Faughs	
1905		
1904	Faughs	

== Division 2 ==
=== By club ===
#	Team	Titles	Years
1	St. Oliver Plunketts/ER	1	2026
1	Castleknock	1	2025

== Division 3 ==
=== By club ===
#	Team	Titles	Years
1	Whitehall Colmcille	1	2026
1	Naomh Ólaf	1	2025

== Division 4 ==
=== By club ===
#	Team	Titles	Years
1	O’Tooles	1	2026
1	Kilmacud Crokes	1	2025
