= Martin Shanahan =

Former Irish public servant, later management consultant

Martin Shanahan (born 1973) is a former Irish public servant, CEO of inward investment agency IDA Ireland from 2014 to 2022, now a partner at Grant Thornton Ireland. During his 8 years heading the IDA, which encompassed Brexit, the COVID-19 pandemic and a major change to US corporate taxation policy, multinational presence in Ireland grew by a significant percentage, and employment in that sector grew from around 160,000 to over 300,000. The holder of multiple degrees and a professor at University College Dublin, he initially worked in the hospitality trade, including management of hotels.

== Early life and education ==
Shanahan was born in Abbeydorney, County Kerry.

He studied at Cathal Brugha Street DIT, and holds a H.Dip (Higher Diploma) in Hotel and Catering Management, and an M.Sc., from Dublin Institute of Technology, as well as a B.Sc. (Mgmt.) and M.A. (1994) from Trinity College Dublin, and an M.Res (Master of Educational Research) from Lancaster University.

== Early career - hospitality ==
Shanahan's early experience was in the hospitality industry, working in bars and hotels from what he describes as an early age, including with the Sinnott chain, eventually managing hotels.

== Public sector ==
Shanahan moved to the public sector, taking roles including at Fáilte Ireland, the Irish tourism promotion and development authority, and in regional operations and management of CERT (a State tourism training body).

=== Forfás ===
He worked from 2005 to 2014 in Forfás, an Irish state-funded policy agency which advised government on enterprise, trade, science, technology, and innovation, with a staff of 90. Shanahan worked in a number of Forfás roles before becoming CEO in 2010. Forfas was dissolved in 2014, as part of the Government's commitment to reducing the number of Irish State quangos, and its functions were transferred to the Department of Jobs, Enterprise and Innovation, Enterprise Ireland, the Industrial Development Authority and the Health and Safety Authority.

=== IDA Ireland ===
Shanahan held the position of CEO of IDA Ireland from 2014 to 2022. The role was described by journalist Colm Kelpie as "part politician, part diplomat, and part salesman". Shanahan highlighted the availability of talent above all, and satisfaction with the quality of the country's third-level education system, as reasons why Ireland has been so popular with multinational companies.

==== Brexit ====
The first major event to occur during Shanahan's tenure as IDA CEO was Brexit, and he was quoted as saying Brexit was likely to be a net positive for IDA Ireland in terms of attracting companies (both UK and non-UK) to Ireland as a base for selling into the EU. In June 2017 Shanahan was criticized for filling only one of ten positions that his office had been given to hire people to attract companies to Ireland that were leaving the UK due to Brexit.

In October 2017 and January 2018, Shanahan testified before the Public Accounts Committee that Ireland needed to improve the affordability of its housing and its infrastructure, particularly broadband internet access, to remain competitive in attracting foreign companies; he also said that while companies in the financial industry were considering moving from the UK to Ireland due to Brexit, the loss of access to the UK for companies that depend on it for sales or supplies could harm Irish companies. As of December 2017, several major financial firms based in the UK had chosen to go to Frankfurt, Luxembourg, Brussels, or Paris, and in January 2018 Shanahan reported that no new jobs had been created in Ireland due to Brexit and that he expected to see the outcome of his office's efforts at the end of 2018 or the beginning of 2019. By June 2018 companies opting to go elsewhere had caused Ireland to fall out of the top 10 rankings for European financial firms.

==== US corporate tax changes ====
The second major event was the Tax Cuts and Jobs Act of 2017 (or TCJA) which changes the tax structure for U.S. multinationals in Ireland. Shanahan was confident that the impact of the TCJA could be managed, noting Ireland's headline corporate tax rate of 12.5% was competitive against the new headline U.S. corporate tax rate of 21%.

==== Interviews ====
In November 2014, Shanahan was interviewed on CNBC's Squawk Box live in the CNBC studio. During the interview, long-standing CNBC presenter Joe Kernen asked unusual questions including: "Do tax breaks lead to better golfers?" "Is Ireland really in the euro?" "Is it not just part of Britain?" and "Is it actually its own island?". The unusual interview received international coverage

During the Irish Same-sex marriage referendum in 2015, Shanahan stated that a 'Yes' vote would be in the State's economic interest and that a 'No' vote would send a negative message to the international business community (Ireland's largest company is Apple). His interview drew praise and criticism with some questioning if he had over-stepped his position, as Shanahan himself is gay.

==== Editing of Wikipedia articles ====
In April 2019, there was a controversy relating to the alleged editing of Wikipedia pages by paid editors, following allegations by Web Summit founder Paddy Cosgrave. Various pages were claimed to have been impacted, including those relating to Shanahan, the Irish economy and taxation system, and others (many of these pages had been established or mainly contributed to by a Wikipedia user named Britishfinance).

==== Bogus IDA jobs scheme ====
In 2023, investigative news website The Ditch reported that Shanahan, along with then Taoiseach Enda Kenny and then Junior Minister for Enterprise Damien English, announced the creation of 50 jobs in 2014 linked to the now defunct Succeed in Ireland scheme. Not a single one of the 50 jobs was ever created.

==== Departure ====
In July 2022, Shanahan announced that he would be leaving his role at the IDA, and moving to the private sector. His contract contained no limitations on such a move but he voluntarily agreed to undertake a period of "gardening leave" between jobs, set by the board of the IDA at 3 months, followed by a further period of leave before starting his new job. He departed the IDA in October 2022.

==== Overall achievements ====
During Shanahan's time as head of IDA Ireland, the number of multinational companies with operations in Ireland grew from 1098 to 1691, and employment by multinationals in Ireland rose from around 160,000 to in excess of 300,000, more than 275,000 of those in IDA clients.

== Professional services ==
In June 2023, Martin Shanahan was announced as taking up a role as a partner, and head of the "FDI and Industries" function at professional services provider Grant Thornton Ireland.

== Academia ==
As of October 2019, Shanahan was appointed for five years as a Full Professor on an adjunct basis at Ireland's largest university, University College Dublin.

== Personal life ==
As of last report, Shanahan lives in Skerries, in Fingal, north of Dublin, with his partner, Gary. He is a prominent member of the LGBT community and LGBT in business. He was ranked #11 in the Financial Times OUTstanding Lists for LGBT Public Sector executives.
