= Paddy Kirwan (Gaelic footballer) =

Irish Gaelic footballer

Personal information
- Native name: Pádraig Ó Ciarubháin (Irish)
- Born: 13 November 1899 Cavan, County Cavan, Ireland
- Died: 1 September 1963 (aged 63) Raheny, Dublin, Ireland
- Occupation: Garda Síochána

Sport
- Sport: Gaelic football
Club
- Years: Club
- Dublin Metropolitan Police
Inter-county
- Years: County
- 1923-1924: Dublin
Inter-county titles
- Leinster titles: 2
- All-Irelands: 1

Patrick J. Kirwan (13 November 1899 – 1 September 1963) was an Irish Gaelic footballer. His championship career at senior level with the Dublin county team lasted two seasons from 1923 until 1924.

Kirwan joined the Dublin senior team during the 1923 championship. Over the course of the next two seasons he enjoyed much success and won an All-Ireland medal in 1923. He also won back-to-back Leinster medals.

== Honours ==
Dublin

- All-Ireland Senior Football Championship (1): 1923
- Leinster Senior Football Championship (2): 1923, 1924
