= 1933 All-Ireland Senior Football Championship =

Football championship

All-Ireland Champions
- Winning team: Cavan (1st win)
- Captain: Jim Smith

All-Ireland Finalists
- Losing team: Galway
- Captain: Michael Donnellan

Provincial Champions
- Munster: Kerry
- Leinster: Dublin
- Ulster: Cavan
- Connacht: Galway

Championship statistics

The 1933 All-Ireland Senior Football Championship was the 47th staging of Ireland's premier Gaelic football knock-out competition. Cavan won their first title. Were also the first county from the province of Ulster to win. They ended Kerry's 4-year period in the All Ireland semi-final as All Ireland champions.

== Results ==
=== Connacht Senior Football Championship ===
28 May 1933
Quarter-Final

Galway	2–10 – 0–0	Roscommon

Tuam

11 June 1933
Semi-Final

Mayo	4–10 – 1–0	Leitrim

Tubbercurry

2 July 1933
Semi-Final

Galway	4–8 – 0–4	Sligo

Castlerea

23 July 1933
Final

Galway	1–7 – 1–5	Mayo
		G Ormsby (0–1) & G Courell (1–2).

Castlerea

=== Leinster Senior Football Championship ===
7 May 1933
Quarter-Final

Offaly	1–3 – 4–4	Wexford

Croke Park, Dublin
Referee: J Curran

28 May 1933
Quarter-Final

Louth	4–7 – 1–6	Westmeath

Navan

28 May 1933
Quarter-Final

Kildare	1–9 – 2–6	Laois
P.Pringle 1–1, P.Byrne 0–3, T.Keogh, P.Martin 0–2, P.Matthews 0–1.

Nowlan Park, Kilkenny

11 June 1933
Quarter-Final

Dublin	1–8 – 1–4	Meath

Drogheda Park, Drogheda

11 June 1933
Quarter-Final

Kildare	2–11 – 1–5	Laois
P.Byrne 1–4, T.Keogh 1–2, P.Martin 0–2, H.Burke, M.Behan, J.Higgins 0–1.

Nowlan Park, Kilkenny

25 June 1933
Semi-Final

Dublin	3–6 – 1–3	Louth

Navan

2 July 1933
Semi-Final

Kildare	1–8 – 2–8	Wexford
P.Byrne 0–5, T.Keogh 1–0, P.Pringle, P.Martin, H.Burke 0–1.

Croke Park, Dublin

30 July 1933
Final

Dublin	0–9 – 1–4	Wexford
Murt Kelly 0-3f, Joe Fitzgerald and Peter Synott 0–2 each, Billy Dowling and Paddy Perry 0–1 each		Martin O'Neill 1–2, Jack Fane (0-1f) and Davy Morris 0–1 each

Croke Park, Dublin
Attendance: 16,000
Referee: J.V. Kelly (Longford)

=== Munster Senior Football Championship ===
14 May 1933
Quarter-Final

Tipperary	1–11 – 1–2	Clare

Gaelic Grounds, Limerick
Referee: W. Hough (L)

14 May 1933
Quarter-Final

Cork	4–4 – 4–4	Waterford
D. McCarthy (0–1), J. McKenna (1–2), D. O'Sullivan (2–0) & J. O'Regan (1–0).

Mitchelstown

2 July 1933
Quarter-Final Replay

Cork	2–7 – 0–1	Waterford
J. Cummins (0–1), W. Lynch (0–3), D. O'Sullivan (1–0), J. McKenna (0–3) & J. O'Regan (1–0).

Fraher Field, Dungarvan

23 July 1933
Semi-Final

Tipperary	2–9 – 2–2	Cork
		J. McKenna (1–1) & J. O'Regan (1–0).

Ned Hall Park, Clonmel
Referee: S. Moynihan (K)

13 August 1933
Final

Kerry	2–8 – 1–4	Tipperary
Paul Russell (1–1), Johnny Walsh (0–1), Martin Regan (0–1), Tim Landers (1–0), Jackie Ryan (0–4) & Charlie O'Sullivan (0–1).

Ned Hall Park, Clonmel
Referee: P. O'Donnell (W)

=== Ulster Senior Football Championship ===
11 June 1933
Quarter-Final

Antrim	0–3 – 0–3	Tyrone

Coalisland

18 June 1933
Quarter-Final

Armagh	2–1 – 1–3	Down

Warrenpoint

25 June 1933
Quarter-Final Replay

Antrim	3–5 – 3–5 A.E.T.	Tyrone

Corrigan Park, Belfast

25 June 1933
Quarter-Final

Fermanagh	2–3 – 0–3	Monaghan

Belturbet

9 July 1933
Quarter-Final, 2nd Replay

Antrim	1–2 – 1–8	Tyrone

Omagh

2 July 1933
Semi-Final

Armagh	0–2 – 1–8	Cavan

Breffni Park, Cavan
Attendance: 2,500

16 July 1933
Semi-Final

Fermanagh	1–3 – 1–4	Tyrone

Bundoran
Attendance: 6,000

6 August 1933
Final

Cavan	6–13 – 1–2	Tyrone

Breffni Park, Cavan

=== All-Ireland Senior Football Championship ===
20 August 1933
Semi-Final

Galway	0–8 – 1–4	Dublin

Cusack Park, Mullingar

27 August 1933
Semi-Final

Cavan	1–5 – 0–5	Kerry
		Jackie Ryan 0–3, Paul Russell 0–1, Miko Doyle 0–1

Breffni Park, Cavan

24 September 1933
Final

Cavan	2–5 – 1–4	Galway

Croke Park, Dublin
Attendance: 45,188
Referee: Martin O'Neill (Wexford)

== Championship statistics ==
=== Miscellaneous ===
- Leitrim withdraw from Connacht championship until 1942.
- Mullingar's Grounds becomes known as Cusack Park, in Mullingar after Michael Cusack.
- Kerry are denied a five-in-a-row by losing the All-Ireland semi-final to Cavan; they would later be denied a five-in-a-row after losing the 1982 final.
- Cavan becomes the first Ulster team to win the All Ireland title.
