= 1919 All-Ireland Senior Football Championship =

All-Ireland Champions
- Winning team: Kildare (2nd win)
- Captain: Larry Stanley

All-Ireland Finalists
- Losing team: Galway

Provincial Champions
- Munster: Kerry
- Leinster: Kildare
- Ulster: Cavan
- Connacht: Galway

Championship statistics

The 1919 All-Ireland Senior Football Championship was the 33rd staging of Ireland's premier Gaelic football knock-out competition. In the Leinster semi-final Dublin ended Wexford's 4-year period as All Ireland champions but lost Leinster final to Kildare were the winners.

== Results ==
=== Connacht ===
Connacht Senior Football Championship

15 June 1919
Quarter-Final

Sligo	1–1 – 3–1	Roscommon

Boyle

5 July 1919
Semi-Final

Galway	1–3 – 1–2	Mayo

Tuam
Attendance: 6,000

13 July 1919
Semi-Final

Roscommon	1–6 – 0–1	Leitrim

Castlerea

3 August 1919
Final

Galway	1–6 – 0–5	Roscommon

Tuam
Attendance: 3,000

=== Leinster ===
Leinster Senior Football Championship

1919
Preliminary Round

Wexford	0–6 – 0–2	Kilkenny

New Ross

1919
Preliminary Round

Meath	2–5 – 2–5	Louth

Drogheda

1919
Preliminary Round 1st Replay

Meath	1–6 – 1–6 A.E.T.	Louth

1919
Preliminary Round 2nd Replay

Meath	1–5 – 1–4	Louth

Navan

1919
Preliminary Round

Westmeath	2–2 – 1–0	Longford

Edgeworthstown

15 June 1919
Quarter-Final

Westmeath	0–3 – 0–2	Offaly

Tullamore

June 1919
Quarter-Final

Wexford	5–3 – 0–1	Wicklow

Enniscorthy

1 June 1919
Quarter-Final

Kildare	3–5 – 2–5	Laois

Newbridge

1919
Quarter-Final

Dublin	0–7 – 0–2	Meath

Navan

6 July 1919
Semi-Final

Westmeath	1–5 – 4–3	Kildare

Edenderry

1919
Semi-Final

Dublin	0–11 – 1–1	Wexford

Croke Park, Dublin

7 September 1919
Final

Kildare	1–3 – 1–2	Dublin

Croke Park, Dublin
Referee: Patrick Dunphy (Laois)

=== Munster ===
Munster Senior Football Championship

18 May 1919
Quarter-Final

Waterford	2–0 – 0–2	Cork

Dungarvan

25 May 1919
Quarter-Final

Kerry	2–4 – 2–3	Tipperary

Cork Athletic Grounds
Referee: T. Irwin (Cork)

1919
Semi-Final

Kerry	6–5 – 0–0	Waterford

Tralee

1919
Semi-Final

Clare	1–4 – 0–2	Limerick

Ennis

3 August 1919
Final

Kerry	6–11 – 2–0	Clare

Ennis

=== Ulster ===
Ulster Senior Football Championship

18 May 1919
Quarter-Final

Armagh	0–4 – 0–3	Monaghan

Castleblayney

25 May 1919
Preliminary Round

Derry	2–4 – 0–3	Fermanagh

Wattlebridge

25 May 1919
Quarter-Final

Donegal	4–3 – 1–0	Tyrone

Strabane

1 June 1919
Quarter-Final

Cavan	0–10 – 1–0	Down

Cavan

1 June 1919
Quarter-Final

Antrim	1–4 – 1–1	Derry

Derry

22 June 1919
Semi-Final

Antrim	2–4 – 1–4	Armagh

Armagh

6 July 1919
Semi-Final

Cavan	3–11 – 2–3	Donegal

Bundoran
Attendance: 3,000

31 August 1919
Final

Cavan	5–5 – 0–2	Antrim

Clones

=== Semi-finals ===
24 August 1919
Semi-Final

Galway	2–6 – 3–3	Kerry

Croke Park, Dublin

14 September 1919
Semi-Final Replay

Galway	4–2 – 2–2	Kerry

Croke Park, Dublin

14 September 1919
Semi-Final

Kildare	3–2 – 1–3	Cavan
Frank "Joyce" Conlon 2–0

Navan

=== Final ===
28 September 1919
Final

Kildare	2–5 – 0–1	Galway

Croke Park, Dublin
Attendance: 32,000
Referee: Pat Dunphy (Laois)

== Statistics ==
=== Miscellaneous ===
- Last Munster final to be played in Ennis until 2024.
- Galway play in a first All-Ireland final, but lose it to Kildare.
