= 1922 All-Ireland Senior Football Championship =

Football championship

All-Ireland Champions
- Winning team: Dublin (13th win)
- Captain: Paddy Carey

All-Ireland Finalists
- Losing team: Galway

Provincial Champions
- Munster: Tipperary
- Leinster: Dublin
- Ulster: Monaghan
- Connacht: Galway

Championship statistics

The 1922 All-Ireland Senior Football Championship was the 36th staging of Ireland's premier Gaelic football knock-out competition. Dublin were the winners.

== Results ==
=== Connacht ===
Connacht Senior Football Championship

6 May 1923
Quarter-Final

| Sligo | 2–4 – 0–4 | Roscommon |

Ballaghadereen
Referee: W. J. Tolan (Sligo)

An objection was made and a replay ordered.

5 August 1923
Quarter-Final Replay

| Sligo | 3–5 – 0–2 | Roscommon |

Ballaghadereen

22 July 1923
Semi-Final

| Galway | 3–3 – 0–3 | Leitrim |

Boyle

19 August 1923
Semi-Final

| Sligo | 3–8 – 2–5 | Mayo |

Castlerea

2 September 1923
Final

| Sligo | 3–2 – 1–7 | Galway |

Tuam

Galway made an objection and a replay was ordered.

30 September 1923
Final Replay

| Galway | 2–4 – 1–5 | Sligo |

Croke Park, Dublin

=== Leinster ===
Leinster Senior Football Championship

1922
Quarter-Final

| Kilkenny | 4–4 – 0–1 | Laois |

Kilkenny

1922
Quarter-Final

| Dublin | 1–5 – 0–2 | Louth |

Navan

30 April 1922
Quarter-Final

| Kildare | 2–5 – 1–1 | Wexford |

Croke Park, Dublin

1922
Semi-Final

| Meath | 1–2 – 4–4 | Kilkenny |

Croke Park, Dublin

1 October 1922
Semi-Final

| Dublin | 2–5 – 0–2 | Kildare |

Croke Park, Dublin

5 November 1922
Final

| Dublin | 1–7 – 0–2 | Kilkenny |
|---|---|---|
| Paddy McDonnell 1–4 (0-2f), Bill Donovan 0–2, Bill Robbins 0–1 | | Mick Connolly 0–2 |

Croke Park, Dublin
Referee: Jim Byrne (Wexford)

=== Munster ===
Munster Senior Football Championship

22 April 1923
Quarter-Final

| Cork | 1–7 – 0–2 | Clare |

Markets Field, Limerick

28 April 1923
Quarter-Final

| Tipperary | W.O. – lost | Waterford |

Clonmel

20 May 1923
Semi-Final

| Tipperary | 2–3 – 2–2 | Cork |

Cork Athletic Grounds
Referee: A. Quillinan (Limerick)

1923
Semi-Final

| Limerick | W.O. – Scr. | Kerry |

1 July 1923
Final

| Tipperary | 1–7 – 0–1 | Limerick |

Thurles
Referee: W. P. Aherne (Cork)

=== Ulster ===
Ulster Senior Football Championship

7 May 1922
Quarter-Final

| Monaghan | 1–4 – 1–3 | Antrim |

Clones

16 July 1922
Semi-Final

| Monaghan | 2–9 – 0–2 | Armagh |

Ballybay

13 August 1922
Semi-Final

| Cavan | 4–4 – 1–1 | Derry |

Cavan

22 April 1923
Final

| Cavan | 2–3 – 2–3 | Monaghan |

Clones

20 May 1923
Final Replay

| Cavan | 2–6 – 2–7 | Monaghan |

Belturbet
Attendance: 5,000

=== Semi-finals ===
By the time the semi-final was to be played, the Connacht championship was not finished, so Sligo were nominated to represent Connacht. When Galway beat Sligo in the Connacht final, they were given Sligo's place in the All-Ireland semi-final. Sligo beat Galway in the Connacht final, then beat Tipperary in the semi-final, but Galway objected to Sligo's Connacht final victory and a replay was ordered. A depleted Sligo team lost to Galway, who then took Sligo's place in the final against Dublin.

15 July 1923
Semi-Final

| Dublin | 2–5 – 0–0 | Monaghan |

Dundalk

9 September 1923
Semi-Final

| Sligo | 1–8 – 0–7 | Tipperary |

Croke Park, Dublin
Referee: J. Kirwan

=== Final ===
7 October 1923
Final

| Dublin | 0–6 – 0–4 | Galway |

Croke Park, Dublin
Attendance: 11,792
Referee: Pat Dunphy (Laois)

== Statistics ==
=== Miscellaneous ===
- Most games were delayed and effected by the War of Independence.
- Last Connacht final that was played at Croke Park. Dublin until 2021 the replay game due to an objection.
