= 1921 All-Ireland Senior Football Championship =

Football championship

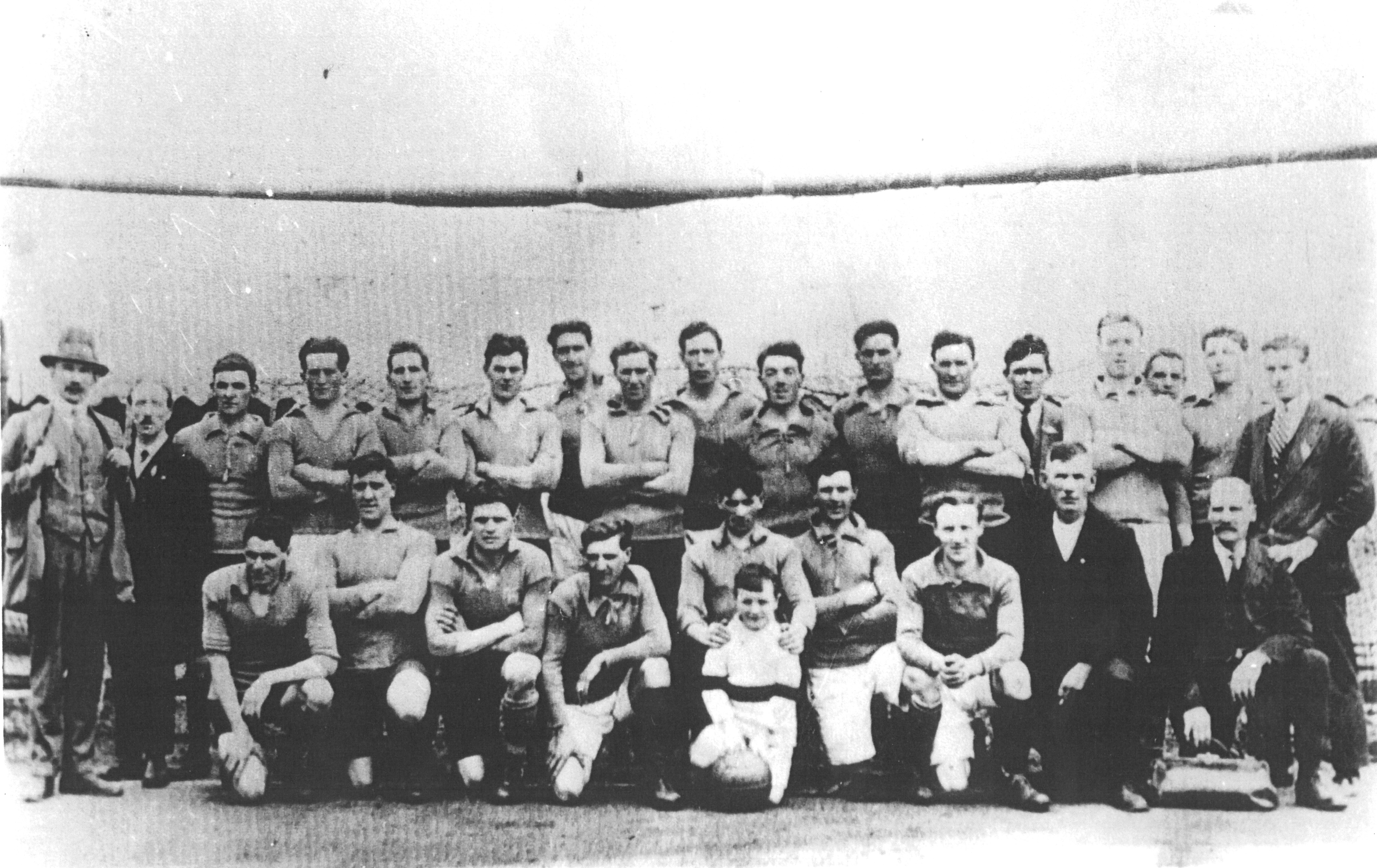

All-Ireland Champions
- Winning team: Dublin (12th win)
- Captain: Eddie Carroll

All-Ireland Finalists
- Losing team: Mayo

Provincial Champions
- Munster: Tipperary
- Leinster: Dublin
- Ulster: Monaghan
- Connacht: Mayo

Championship statistics

The 1921 All-Ireland Senior Football Championship was the 35th staging of Ireland's premier Gaelic football knock-out competition. Dublin were the winners. They ended Tipperary's All Ireland title in the final.

Tipperary were awarded the Munster title due to Civil War the rest of the Munster counties didn't compete in the championship.

== Results ==
=== Connacht ===
Connacht Senior Football Championship

20 November 1921
Quarter-Final

| Mayo | 0–24 – 0–1 | Roscommon |

Castlerea

18 June 1922
Semi-Final

| Galway | 0–1 – 0–6 | Mayo |

Tuam

4 July 1922
Semi-Final

| Roscommon | w/o – scr. | Sligo |

25 March 1923
Final

| Mayo | 1–4 – 0–1 | Roscommon |

Castlerea
Attendance: 2,000

=== Leinster ===
Leinster Senior Football Championship

8 May 1921
Preliminary Round

| Laois | 1–3 – 2–3 | Kildare |

Geraldine Park, Athy

1921
Quarter-Final

| Louth | 4–4 – 0–1 | Westmeath |

Drogheda

5 June 1921
Quarter-Final

| Carlow | 1–1 – 9–8 | Kildare |

Geraldine Park, Athy

1921
Quarter-Final

| Dublin | 3–6 – 0–0 | Meath |

Croke Park, Dublin

1921
Semi-Final

| Dublin | 1–6 – 0–3 | Louth |

Croke Park, Dublin

31 July 1921
Semi-Final

| Kildare | 2–7 – 0–2 | Wexford |

Croke Park, Dublin

28 August 1921
Final

| Dublin | 0–6 – 1–3 | Kildare |
|---|---|---|
| Paddy McDonnell 0–4 (0-1f) and A Dixon 0–2 | | Eamon O'Neill 1–2 (0-1f) and Paul Doyle 0–1 |

Croke Park, Dublin
Attendance: 20,000
Referee: P Dunphy (Laois)

18 September 1921
Final Replay

| Dublin | 3–3 – 1–4 | Kildare |
|---|---|---|
| Joe Synnott 2–0, John Synnott 1–0, Paddy McDonnell 0–2 (0-1f), Martin Shanahan 0–1 | | Joyce Conlan 1–0, Albert O'Neill (0-1f), Mick Sammon (0-1f), George Magan, Eamon O'Neill 0–1 each |

Croke Park, Dublin
Attendance: 27,000
Referee: James Byrne (Wexford)

=== Munster ===
Munster Senior Football Championship

The championship was not held due to the Irish Civil War. Tipperary were chosen to represent the province.

=== Ulster ===
Ulster Senior Football Championship

12 June 1921
Quarter-Final

| Antrim | 1–5 – 1–2 | Down |

Newcastle

6 November 1921
Quarter-Final

| Monaghan | 0–3 – 0–1 | Armagh |

Clones

13 November 1921
Quarter-Final

| Derry | 2–1 – 0–3 | Donegal |

Strabane

11 December 1921
Semi-Final

| Derry | 1–4 – 0–3 | Antrim |

Derry

11 December 1921
Semi-Final

| Monaghan | 0–8 – 0–8 | Cavan |

Clones

22 January 1922
Semi-Final Replay

| Monaghan | 2–2 – 0–2 | Cavan |

Clones

28 October 1923
Final

| Monaghan | 2–2 – 0–1 | Derry |

Clones

=== Semi-finals ===
18 June 1922
Semi-Final

| Dublin | 2–8 – 2–2 | Monaghan |

Dundalk
Referee: T. Burke, (Louth)

29 April 1923
Semi-Final

| Mayo | w/o – scr. | Tipperary |

=== Final ===
17 June 1923
Final

| Dublin | 1–9 – 0–2 | Mayo |

Croke Park, Dublin
Attendance: 16,000
Referee: Willie Walsh (Waterford)

== Statistics ==
=== Miscellaneous ===
- Many games were delayed due to home rule protests.
- Dublin's Semi-Final win v Monaghan was played just one week after Dublin's loss in the 1920 All-Ireland Senior Football Championship Final. Despite this they had to wait almost one year to play the final, owing to the political turmoil.
- Mayo's Semi-Final v Tipperary was originally scheduled for 15 April 1923, but was postponed for one week. Mayo refused a walkover from Tipperary in respect of the Semi-Final scheduled for 22 April 1923, and the match was again rescheduled for 29 April. Tipperary could not field a team on 29 April.
