= 1924 All-Ireland Senior Football Championship =

Football championship

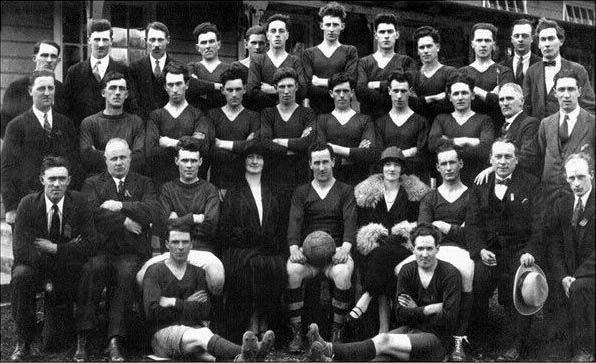

All-Ireland Champions
- Winning team: Kerry (6th win)
- Captain: Phil O'Sullivan

All-Ireland Finalists
- Losing team: Dublin
- Captain: Paddy McDonnell

Provincial Champions
- Munster: Kerry
- Leinster: Dublin
- Ulster: Cavan
- Connacht: Mayo

Championship statistics

The 1924 All-Ireland Senior Football Championship was the 38th staging of Ireland's premier Gaelic football knock-out competition. Dublin entered the championship as the defending champions but failed to win 4 in a row until 2018. Kerry were the winners.

== Results ==
=== Connacht ===
Connacht Senior Football Championship

25 May 1924
Quarter-Final

Roscommon	1–4 – 0–2	Sligo

Ballaghaderreen

22 June 1924
Semi-Final

Mayo	0–2 – 0–2	Leitrim

Ballaghaderreen

6 July 1924
Semi-Final

Galway	2–4 – 1–2	Roscommon

Ballinasloe

An objection was made and a replay ordered.

31 August 1924
Semi-Final Replay

Mayo	3–1 – 1–2	Leitrim

Sligo

21 September 1924
Semi-Final Replay

Galway	4–3 – 1–1	Roscommon

Castlerea

19 October 1924
Final

Mayo	0–1 – 0–1	Galway

Balla

9 November 1924
Final Replay

Mayo	2–6 – 0–5	Galway

Tuam

=== Leinster ===
Leinster Senior Football Championship

1924
Preliminary Round

Dublin	2–3 – 1–4	Meath

Navan

1924
Quarter-Final

Wexford	4–1 – 1–2	Carlow

Barrett's Park, New Ross

20 April 1924
Quarter-Final

Kildare	3–4 – 0–2	Laois

Geraldine Park, Athy

11 May 1924
Quarter-Final

Kilkenny	0–0 – 3–4	Louth

Croke Park, Dublin

7 September 1924
Semi-Final

Dublin	2–6 – 2–4	Louth

Navan
Attendance: 15000
Referee: P. McCullagh (Wexford)

21 September 1924
Semi-Final

Kildare	0-1– 1–1	Wexford

Croke Park, Dublin

19 October 1924
Final

Dublin	1–4 – 1–4	Wexford

Croke Park, Dublin

30 November 1924
Final Replay

Dublin	3–5 – 2–3	Wexford

Croke Park, Dublin

=== Munster ===
Munster Senior Football Championship

11 May 1924
Quarter-Final

Kerry	5–3 – 1–5	Tipperary

Clonmel
Referee: W. Walsh (Waterford)

18 May 1924
Quarter-Final

Cork	2–1 – 0–0	Waterford

Dungarvan

1924
Semi-Final

Clare	0–6 – 0–0	Limerick

Kilkee

7 September 1924
Semi-Final

Kerry	4–3 – 2–1	Cork

Cork Athletic Grounds
Referee: A. Quilivan (Limerick)

12 October 1924
Final

Kerry	5–8 – 2–2	Clare

Limerick

=== Ulster ===
Ulster Senior Football Championship

18 May 1924
Quarter-Final

Cavan	5–6 – 1–6	Armagh

Cootehill

18 May 1924
Quarter-Final

Tyrone	0–2 – 0–1	Donegal

Letterkenny

25 May 1924
Quarter-Final

Monaghan	4–6 – 2–1	Fermanagh

Clones

1 June 1924
Quarter-Final

Antrim	0–9 – 0–5	Down

Downpatrick

22 June 1924
Semi-Final

Monaghan	1–5 – 1–4	Antrim

Ballybay

An objection was made and a replay ordered.

24 August 1924
Semi-Final

Cavan	1–7 – 0–7	Tyrone

Belturbet

31 August 1924
Semi-Final

Monaghan	1–4 – 1–1	Antrim

Carrickmacross

21 September 1924
Final

Cavan	1–3 – 0–6	Monaghan

Belturbet

2 November 1924
Final Replay

Cavan	2–3 – 1–6	Monaghan

Ballybay

=== Semi-finals ===
7 December 1924
Semi-Final

Kerry	1–4 – 0–1	Mayo

Croke Park, Dublin

18 January 1925
Semi-Final

Dublin	0–6 – 1–1	Cavan

Croke Park, Dublin

=== Final ===
26 April 1925
Final

Kerry	0–4 – 0–3	Dublin

Croke Park, Dublin
Attendance: 28,844
Referee: T Shevlin (Roscommon)

== Statistics ==
=== Miscellaneous ===
- There was a six-week gap between the drawn and replay of the Leinster final between Dublin and Wexford. And the Ulster final between Cavan and Monaghan.
- Kerry stopped Dublin to winning a might have been a 4th All-Ireland title in a row in the All-Ireland final.
