= 1923 All-Ireland Senior Football Championship =

Football championship

All-Ireland Champions
- Winning team: Dublin (14th win)
- Captain: Paddy McDonnell

All-Ireland Finalists
- Losing team: Kerry
- Captain: Phil O'Sullivan

Provincial Champions
- Munster: Kerry
- Leinster: Dublin
- Ulster: Cavan
- Connacht: Mayo

Championship statistics

The 1923 All-Ireland Senior Football Championship was the 37th staging of Ireland's premier Gaelic football knock-out competition. Dublin were the winners.

== Results ==
=== Connacht ===
Connacht Senior Football Championship

14 October 1923
Quarter-Final

Leitrim	2–5 – 0–2	Roscommon

Boyle

28 October 1923
Semi-Final

Mayo	3–5 – 1–2	Sligo

Castlerea

13 April 1924
Semi-Final

Galway	1–3 – 1–0	Leitrim

Strokestown

4 May 1924
Final

Mayo	0–3 – 0–2	Galway

Tuam
Referee: W. J. Tolan (Sligo)

=== Leinster ===
Leinster Senior Football Championship

1923
Quarter-Final

Laois	2–7 – 1–4	Wexford

Croke Park, Dublin

15 April 1923
Quarter-Final

Kilkenny	2–3 – 2–1	Kildare

Portlaoise

1923
Quarter-Final

Meath	1–4 – 0–2	Louth

Navan

1923
Semi-Final

Dublin	3–3 – 1–2	Laois

Kilkenny

8 July 1923
Semi-Final

Meath	3–1 – 0–3	Kilkenny

Croke Park, Dublin
Referee: P. McCullagh (Wexford)

12 August 1923
Final

Dublin	3–5 – 0–0	Meath

Croke Park, Dublin
Attendance: 3,500

=== Munster ===
Munster Senior Football Championship

8 July 1923
Quarter-Final

Cork	1–5 – 2–1	Waterford

Cork Athletic Grounds

29 July 1923
Quarter-Final

Kerry	4–5 – 1–3	Limerick

Market's Field, Limerick

22 July 1923
Semi-Final

Tipperary	4–8 – 1–2	Clare

Nenagh
Referee: A. Quillinan (Limerick)

2 September 1923
Semi-Final

Kerry	3–4 – 0–3	Cork

Cork Athletic Grounds

14 October 1923
Final

Kerry	0–5 – 0–3	Tipperary

Tralee
Referee: W. P. Aherne (Cork)

=== Ulster ===
Ulster Senior Football Championship

10 June 1923
Quarter-Final

Cavan	1–5 – 0–4	Antrim

Belturbet

17 June 1923
Quarter-Final

Derry	1–3 – 1–2	Donegal

Letterkenny

8 July 1923
Quarter-Final

Monaghan	4–1 – 1–4	Armagh

Ballybay

12 August 1923
Semi-Final

Cavan	4–10 – 3–1	Donegal

Bundoran

2 September 1923
Final

Cavan	5–10 – 1–1	Monaghan

Cavan

=== Semi-finals ===
27 April 1924
Semi-Final

Kerry	1–3 – 1–2	Cavan

Croke Park, Dublin

18 May 1924
Semi-Final

Dublin	1–6 – 1–2	Mayo

Croke Park, Dublin

=== Final ===
28 September 1924
Final

Dublin	1–5 – 1–3	Kerry

Croke Park, Dublin
Attendance: 18,500
Referee: James Byrne (Wexford)

== Statistics ==
=== Miscellaneous ===
- Dublin win the All-Ireland title for a third year in a row.
