= 2014 Munster Senior Football Championship =

The 2014 Munster Senior Football Championship was that year's installment of the annual Munster Senior Football Championship held under the auspices of Munster GAA. It was one of the four provincial competitions of the 2014 All-Ireland Senior Football Championship. Kerry entered the competition as defending Munster champions.

In September 2013, it was announced that the Munster Championship would become a seeded competition for 2014. This allowed footballing powerhouses Cork and Kerry to avoid each other until the final - where they duly met, Kerry emerging victorious and proceeding to an All-Ireland Final against Donegal. The decision to ease Cork and Kerry's passage through the Championship was overturned ahead of the 2015 competition after footballing minnows Clare, Limerick, Tipperary and Waterford (all four traditionally more successful at the ancient field sport of hurling) ganged together and gathered in a hotel on Tipperary soil to hammer out a format more suitable for their own needs.

The draw for the 2014 competition was made on 3 October 2013.

== Teams ==
The Munster championship is contested by all six counties in the Irish province of Munster.

Team	Colours	Sponsor	Manager	Captain	Most recent success
Team	Colours	Sponsor	Manager	Captain	All-Ireland	Provincial
Clare	Saffron and Blue	Pat O'Donnell	Colm Collins	Gary Brennan		1992
Cork	Red and white	Chill Insurance	Brian Cuthbert	Michael Shields	2010	2012
Kerry	Green and gold	Kerry Group	Éamonn Fitzmaurice	Fionn Fitzgerald; Kieran O'Leary (Note: Colm Cooper was initially named as Kerry captain ahead of the Championship, but a cruciate ligament injury sustained in the All-Ireland Club Championship ruled him out for the season.)	2009	2013
Limerick	Green and white	Sporting Limerick	John Brudair	Seanie Buckley	1896	1896
Tipperary	Blue and gold	Škoda Auto	Peter Creedon	Paddy Codd	1920	1935
Waterford	White and blue	3 Mobile	Niall Carew	Shane Briggs		1898

== Bracket ==
Quarter-finals
Limerick	1-11
Tipperary	2-14
Clare (R)	2-08; 3-11
Waterford (R)	2-08; 0-12

Semi-finals
Tipperary	1-11
Cork	0-16
Kerry	1-17
Clare	1-13

Final
Cork	0-12
Kerry	0-24

== Fixtures ==
=== Quarter-finals ===
31 May 2014
7.00pm
Quarter Final

Limerick	1-11 – 2-14	Tipperary
E Hanrahan (1-04), I Ryan (0-04), I Corbett, D Tracey, G Collins (0-01 each)	Report	B Grogan (1-04), P Austin (1-02), P Acheson (0-02), C O’Riordan, R Kiely, G Hannigan, B Fox, M Quinlivan, C Sweeney (0-01 each)

Gaelic Grounds, Limerick
Referee: A Nolan (Wicklow)

7 June 2014
7.00pm
Quarter Final

Clare	2-8 – 2-8	Waterford
D Tubridy (1-02), E Coughlan (1-00), G Brennan, S McGrath (0-02 each), J Malone, M O’Leary (0-01 each)	Report	P Whyte (1-02), L O Lonain (1-00), S Aherne, JJ Hutchinson (0-02 each), M Curry, T O hUllachain (0-01 each)

Cusack Park, Ennis
Referee: C Lane (Cork)

14 June 2014
7.00pm
Quarter Final Replay

Clare	3-11 – 0-12	Waterford
G Brennan (1-02), S Brennan, R Donnelly (1-00 each), S Collins, S McGrath (0-03 each), D Tubridy, J Malone, C Russell (0-01 each)	Report	P Whyte (0-05), JJ Hutchinson (0-04), L O’Lonan (0-02), D Allen (0-01)

Fraher Field, Dungarvan
Attendance: 1357
Referee: M Deegan (Laois)

=== Semi-finals ===
21 June 2014
7.00pm
Semi Final

Cork	0-16 – 1-11	Tipperary
D Goulding, A Walsh (0-03 each), M Collins, C O’Neill, B O’Driscoll (0-02 each), B Hurley, J Hayes, P Kerrigan, F Goold (0-01 each)	Report	C Sweeney (1-04), B Grogan (0-02), M Quinlivan, S O’Brien, C O’Riordan, P Acheson, B Mulvihill (0-01 each)

Páirc Uí Chaoimh, Ballintemple
Referee: F Kelly (Longford)

22 June 2014
3.30pm
Semi Final

Clare	1-13 – 1-17	Kerry
S McGrath (1-02) D Tubridy (0-04), E Coughlan (0-02), S Brennan, M O’Leary, S Collins, R Donnelly, E Cleary (0-01 each)	Report	P Geaney (0-06), B Sheehan (0-04), P Murphy (1-00), S O’Brien, D O’Sullivan (0-02 each), A Maher, M Geaney, BJ Keane (0-01 each)

Cusack Park, Ennis
Referee: D Gough (Meath)

=== Final ===
6 July 2014
2.00pm
Final

Cork	0-12 – 0-24	Kerry
D Goulding (0-06), B Hurley (0-04), A Walsh, F Goold (0-01 each)	Report	J O’Donoghue (0-10), J Buckley, B Sheehan (0-04 each), P Geaney (0-03), S O’Brien, D Walsh, Declan O’Sullivan (0-01 each)

Páirc Uí Chaoimh
Referee: C Reilly (Meath)

== Miscellaneous ==
- For the first time since 2008 and last time until 2026 Munster championship was seeded not allowing Kerry vs Cork fixture until Munster final day.

== See also ==
- Fixtures and results
- 2014 All-Ireland Senior Football Championship
  - 2014 Connacht Senior Football Championship
  - 2014 Leinster Senior Football Championship
  - 2014 Ulster Senior Football Championship
