= Tadhg Morley =

Kerry Gaelic footballer

Personal information
- Native name: Tadhg Ó Muraile (Irish)
- Born: 1993 (age 32–33)
- Occupation: Primary school teacher
- Height: 6 ft 0 in (183 cm)

Sport
- Sport: Gaelic football
- Position: Centre Back
Club
- Years: Club
- 2011–: Templenoe
College
- Years: College
- 2011–2015: Marino Institute of Education
Inter-county*
Years	County	Apps (scores)
2016–2026	Kerry	57
Inter-county titles
- Munster titles: 7
- All-Irelands: 2
- NFL: 5
- All Stars: 1
- *Inter County team apps and scores correct as of Match played 24 July 2022.

Tadhg Morley (Irish: Tadhg Ó Muraile) is an Irish Gaelic footballer who previously played for the Kerry county team.

== Playing career ==
=== Underage ===
Morley played minor for Kerry in 2010 and 2011.

He played Under-21 for Kerry in 2012, 2013 and 2014.

=== Club ===
Morley plays for the Templenoe club who are situated just outside of Kenmare.

In 2015, he won Kerry and Munster Junior Club Football Championships and the All-Ireland Junior Championship in 2016. Morley won Kerry and Munster Intermediate Championships in 2019.

=== Kerry ===
==== 2016–2021 ====
Morley made his championship debut versus Clare in 2016.

He won five Munster Senior Football Championships and three National Football Leagues in his first six seasons on the Kerry county football team.

==== 2022 ====
Morley was one of just three Kerry players to start every League and Championship game in 2022.

He played in the 2022 All-Ireland Senior Football Championship Final and won his first All-Ireland against Galway on a scoreline of 0-20 to 0-16.

Morley was one of seven Kerry players included in The Sunday Game team of the year.

In October 2026, Morley announced his retirement from inter-county football after 11 seasons playing for Kerry.

== Personal life ==
Morley is a primary school teacher in Kenmare, having graduated from Marino Institute of Education.

== Honours ==
Templenoe

- Kerry Junior Football Championship:
  - Winner (1): 2015
- Munster Junior Club Football Championship:
  - Winner (1): 2015
- All-Ireland Junior Club Football Championship:
  - Winner (1): 2016
- Kerry Intermediate Football Championship:
  - Winner (1): 2019
- Munster Intermediate Club Football Championship:
  - Winner (1): 2019

Kerry

- All-Ireland Senior Football Championship:
  - Winner (2): 2022, 2025
- Munster Senior Football Championship:
  - Winner (9): 2016, 2017, 2018, 2019, 2021, 2022, 2023, 2024, 2025
- National Football League:
  - Winner (5): 2017, 2020, 2021, 2022, 2025
- McGrath Cup:
  - Winner (2): 2017, 2022

Individual

- All Star:
  - Winner (1): 2022
- The Sunday Game Team of the Year:
  - Winner (2): 2022, 2023
