= 2019 Munster Senior Football Championship =

2019 Munster SFC
Tournament details
- Year: 2019

Winners
- Champions: Kerry

Runners-up
- Runners-up: Cork

The 2019 Munster Senior Football Championship was the 2019 installment of the annual Munster Senior Football Championship organised by the Munster GAA. The fixtures were announced on 12 October 2018.

Darren Mulhearne notably made his championship debut for Waterford against Clare in the quarter-final at the age of 46, believed to be the oldest player to debut. Two of his opponents in that game, and fellow debutants, had a combined age that was less than that of Mulhearne. He kept a clean sheet, in a one-point loss. Mulhearne was called into the team after Aaron Beresford sustained an injury. Mulhearne had first been part of the Waterford senior team as a 17-year-old schoolboy, but never played.

== Teams ==
The Munster championship is contested by all six counties in the Irish province of Munster.

Team	Colours	Sponsor	Manager	Captain	Most recent success
Team	Colours	Sponsor	Manager	Captain	All-Ireland	Provincial
Clare	Saffron and Blue		Colm Collins	Gary Brennan		1992
Cork	Red and white		Ronan McCarthy	Paul Kerrigan	2010	2012
Kerry	Green and gold		Peter Keane	Gavin White	2014	2018
Limerick	Green and white		Billy Lee	Donal O'Sullivan	1896	1896
Tipperary	Blue and gold		Liam Kearns	Robbie Kiely	1920	1935
Waterford	White and blue		Benji Whelan	Paul Whyte		1898

== Bracket ==
Quarter-finals, May 11
Tipperary	1-10
Limerick	3-11
Clare	0-9
Waterford	0-8

Semi-finals, June 1
Cork	3-18
Limerick	0-06
Kerry	1-15
Clare	0-12

Final, June 22
Cork	3-10
Kerry	1-19

== Quarter-finals ==
The 4 non-finalists of the 2018 championship entered this round. The lowest ranked counties to play in the quarter-finals are Limerick and Waterford of Division 4.

11 May 2019 Quarter Final	Tipperary (2)	1-10 - 3-11	Limerick (4)	Semple Stadium, Thurles
		Report

11 May 2019 Quarter Final	Clare (2)	0-09 - 0-08	Waterford (4)	Cusack Park, Ennis
		Report

== Semi-finals ==
The 2 finalists of the 2018 championship entered this round along with the 2 quarter-final winners. The lowest ranked counties to play in the semi-finals are and Limerick of Division 3.

1 June 2019 Semi Final	Cork (2)	3-18 - 0-06	Limerick (3)	Páirc Uí Rinn, Cork
		Report

1 June 2019 Semi Final	Kerry (1)	1-15 - 0-12	Clare (2)	Cusack Park, Ennis
		Report

== Final ==
22 June 2019	Cork	3-10 - 1-19	Kerry	Páirc Uí Chaoimh, Cork
		Report

Kerry advance to the All-Ireland quarter-finals while Cork advance to the qualifiers.

== See also ==
- 2019 All-Ireland Senior Football Championship
  - 2019 Connacht Senior Football Championship
  - 2019 Leinster Senior Football Championship
  - 2019 Ulster Senior Football Championship
