= 2018 Munster Senior Football Championship =

2018 Munster SFC
Tournament details
- Year: 2018

Winners
- Champions: Kerry

Runners-up
- Runners-up: Cork

The 2018 Munster Senior Football Championship was the 2018 installment of the annual Munster Senior Football Championship organised by the Munster GAA. The fixtures were announced on 31 October 2017.

Kerry won the championship, defeating rivals Cork in the final.

== Teams ==
The Munster championship is contested by all six counties in the Irish province of Munster.

Team	Colours	Sponsor	Manager	Captain	Most recent success
Team	Colours	Sponsor	Manager	Captain	All-Ireland	Provincial
Clare	Saffron and Blue		Colm Collins	Gary Brennan		1992
Cork	Red and white		Ronan McCarthy	Paul Kerrigan	2010	2012
Kerry	Green and gold		Éamonn Fitzmaurice	Fionn Fitzgerald	2014	2017
Limerick	Green and white		Billy Lee	Donal O’Sullivan	1896	1896
Tipperary	Blue and gold		Liam Kearns	Robbie Kiely	1920	1935
Waterford	White and blue		Tom McGlinchey	Paul Whyte		1898

== Bracket ==
Quarter-finals
Tipperary	0-20
Waterford	0-9
Limerick	0-14
Clare	1-22

Semi-finals
Tipperary	0-9
Cork	1-17
Kerry	0-32
Clare	0-10

Final
Cork	2-4
Kerry	3-18

== Fixtures ==
=== Quarter-finals ===
19 May 2018
7:00pm
Quarter-Final

Report

Limerick	0-14 (14) – (26) 1-23	Clare
(HT: 0-07 – 1-09)
Pts: S McSweeney 5 (5f), J Ryan 3 (2f), J Lee 3 (1f), D Neville 2, P White 1		Gls: K Malone 1 Pts: E Cleary 5, K Malone 3, D Tubridy 3 (1f), C Finucane 2, E Courtney 2, P Lillis 1, C O'Connor 1; J Malone 1, K Sexton 1, C Ó hAiniféin 1, G O'Brien 1, G Cooney 1, M O'Leary 1

Gaelic Grounds, Limerick
Referee: Noel Mooney (Cavan)
Attendance: 2,304

19 May 2018
7:00pm
Quarter-Final

Report

Tipperary	0-20 (20) – (9) 0-9	Waterford
(HT: 0-07 – 0-03)
Pts: L McGrath 9 (7f), M Quinlivan 3, K O’Halloran 2, J Feehan 1, J Kennedy 1, J Keane 1, L Boland 1, P Austin 1, J Lonergan 1		Pts: J Curry 3 (1f, 1 sideline), S Prendergast 2, G Crotty 2, C Murray 1, JJ Hutchinson 1

Semple Stadium, Thurles
Referee: Fergal Kelly (Longford)
Attendance: 1,658

=== Semi-finals ===
26 May 2018
7:00 pm
Semi-Final

Report

Tipperary	0-9 (9) – (20) 1-17	Cork
(HT: 0-04 – 1-08)
Pts: L McGrath 5 (4f), J Kennedy 1 (1f), M Quinlivan 1, P Austin 1, L Boland 1		Gls: C O’Neill 1 Pts: L Connolly 10 (5f), M Collins 3, P Kerrigan 2, S White 1, B Hurley 1

Semple Stadium, Thurles
Referee: Anthony Nolan (Wicklow)
Attendance: 3,339

3 June 2018
3:30 pm
Semi-Final

Report

Kerry	0-32 (32) – (10) 0-10	Clare
(HT: 0-16 – 0-4)
Pts: S O’Shea 7 (4f, 1 ’45), P Geaney 7 (1f), J O’Donoghue 4 (2f), S O’Brien 3, BJ Keane 3, M Burns 2, D Clifford 2 (1f), J Barry 1, A Maher 1, M Geaney 1, D O’Sullivan (1f)		Pts: E Cleary 5 (4f), D Tubridy 2 (1f), J Malone 2, P Lillis 1

Fitzgerald Stadium, Killarney
Referee: Barry Cassidy (Derry)
Attendance: 16,729

=== Final ===
RTÉ

23 June 2018
7:00 pm
Munster Final

Report

Cork	2-4 (10) – (27) 3-18	Kerry
(HT: 2-01 – 1-11)
Gls: M Collins 1, L Connolly 1 Pts: L Connolly 2 (1f), M Collins 1, P Kelleher 1		Gls: P Geaney 2, S O’Brien 1 Pts: P Geaney 5, S O’Shea 4 (2 45, 1f), J O’Donoghue 3 (1f), D Clifford 2, P Murphy 2, G White 1, BJ Keane 1

Páirc Uí Chaoimh, Cork
Referee: Ciarán Branagan (Down)
Attendance: 27,764

== See also ==
- 2018 All-Ireland Senior Football Championship
  - 2018 Connacht Senior Football Championship
  - 2018 Leinster Senior Football Championship
  - 2018 Ulster Senior Football Championship
