= 2017 Munster Senior Football Championship =

KUMAR AMRIT

2017 Munster SFC
Tournament details
- Year: 2017

The 2017 Munster Senior Football Championship was the 2017 installment of the annual Munster Senior Football Championship organised by the Munster GAA. It is one of the four provincial competitions of the 2017 All-Ireland Senior Football Championship. Kerry are the defending Munster champions.

Both 2016 Munster finalists receive a bye into this year's Munster semi-finals. The four remaining teams play two quarter-final matches with the winners completing the semi-final line-up. All matches are knock-out. The draw for the competition was held on 13 October 2016 and broadcast on RTÉ2 television.

== Teams ==
The Munster championship is contested by all six counties in the Irish province of Munster.

Team	Colours	Sponsor	Manager	Captain	Most recent success
Team	Colours	Sponsor	Manager	Captain	All-Ireland	Provincial
Clare	Saffron and Blue		Colm Collins	Gary Brennan		1992
Cork	Red and white		Peadar Healy	Paul Kerrigan	2010	2012
Kerry	Green and gold		Éamonn Fitzmaurice	Johnny Buckley	2014	2016
Limerick	Green and white		Billy Lee	Iain Corbett	1896	1896
Tipperary	Blue and gold		Liam Kearns	Brian Fox	1920	1935
Waterford	White and blue		Tom McGlinchey	Paul Whyte		1898

== Bracket ==
Quarter-finals
Limerick	1-12
Clare	1-13
Cork	1-12
Waterford	1-11

Semi-finals
Kerry	1-18
Clare	1-12
Tipperary	1-9
Cork	1-10

Final
Kerry	1-23
Cork	0-15

== Quarter-finals ==
27 May 2017
19:00

Waterford	1-11 - 1-12	Cork
Donie Breathnach 0-6 (0-5f), Gavin Crotty 1-0, Paul White 0-2, Tommy Prendergast, Michael Curry, Aidan Trihy 0-1 each	Report	Paul Kerrigan 1-3, John O’Rourke and Donncha O’Connor 0-3 each, James Loughrey, Mark Collins, Colm O'Neill (0-1f) 0-1 each

Fraher Field, Dungarvan
Referee: Rory Hickey (Clare)
28 May 2017
19:00

Clare	1-13 - 1-12	Limerick
Eoin Cleary 1-4 (0-2f), David Tubridy 0-4 (0-2f), Keelan Sexton 0-3 (1 '45), Pearse Lillis and Sean Collins 0-1 each	Report	Josh Ryan 1-1, Seamus O’Carroll 0-3 (1 sl), Danny Neville and Ger Collins (0-1f) 0-2 each, Sean O’Dea, Darragh Treacy, James Naughton, Iain Corbett 0-1 each

Cusack Park, Ennis
Attendance: 2, 968
Referee: Cormac Reilly (Meath)

== Semi-finals ==
10 June 2017
5pm

Cork	1-10 - 1-9	Tipperary
Luke Connolly 1-2; Paul Kerrigan 0-3; Donncha O’Connor 0-2 (1f); Brian O’Driscoll, Colm O’Neill (1f), Mark Collins 0-1 each.	Report	Conor Sweeney 1-5 (1f); Ken O’Halloran, Liam McGrath, Robbie Kiely, Liam Boland 0-1 each

Pairc Ui Rinn, Cork
Attendance: 4, 570
Referee: Ciaran Branagan (Down)
11 June 2017
3.30pm

Clare	1-12 - 1-18	Kerry
Eoin Cleary 0-6 (4f), David Tubridy 1-3 (1p), Ciaran Russell, Cathal O’Connor (1f), Jamie Malone 0-1 each.	Report	James O’Donoghue 0-9 (5f), Paul Geaney 0-4 (2f), Stephen O'Brien 1-1, Shane Enright, Anthony Maher, Michael Geaney 0-1 each,

Cusack Park, Ennis
Attendance: 5,786
Referee: P Hughes (Armagh)

== Munster Final ==
2 July 2017; 2:00 pm	Cork	0-15 - 1-23	Kerry	Fitzgerald Stadium, Killarney; Attendance: 31,836; Referee: Paddy Neilan (Roscommon)
2 July 2017; 2:00 pm	Donncha O’Connor 0-6 (0-4f), Mark Collins 0-2 (0-1f), Niall Coakley (0-2f) and Luke Connolly (0-1f), Tomas Clancy, Ian Maguire, Paul Kerrigan 0-1 each.	Report	Paul Geaney 1-05 (0-1f), James O'Donoghue 0-7 (0-4f), Stephen O’Brien 0-3, Michael Geaney 0-2 (1 ’45), Shane Enright, Paul Murphy, David Moran, Anthony Maher, Kieran Donaghy, Barry John Keane 0-1 each	Fitzgerald Stadium, Killarney; Attendance: 31,836; Referee: Paddy Neilan (Roscommon)

== See also ==
- 2017 All-Ireland Senior Football Championship
  - 2017 Connacht Senior Football Championship
  - 2017 Leinster Senior Football Championship
  - 2017 Ulster Senior Football Championship
