= 2016 Munster Senior Football Championship =

2016 Munster SFC
Tournament details
- Year: 2016

Winners
- Champions: Kerry (78th win)
- Manager: Éamonn Fitzmaurice
- Captain: Bryan Sheehan

Runners-up
- Runners-up: Tipperary
- Manager: Liam Kearns
- Captain: Peter Acheson

The 2016 Munster Senior Football Championship was the 2016 installment of the annual Munster Senior Football Championship held under the auspices of Munster GAA. It is one of the four provincial competitions of the 2016 All-Ireland Senior Football Championship. Kerry entered the competition as defending Munster champions and retained their title after a 3-17 to 2-10 victory over Tipperary

Last year's Munster finalists receive a bye into this year's Munster semi-finals. The four remaining teams play two quarter-final matches with the winners completing the semi-final line-up. All matches are knock-out.

== Teams ==
The Munster championship is contested by all six counties in the Irish province of Munster.

Team	Colours	Sponsor	Manager	Captain	Most recent success
Team	Colours	Sponsor	Manager	Captain	All-Ireland	Provincial
Clare	Saffron and Blue	Pat O'Donnell	Colm Collins	Gary Brennan		1992
Cork	Red and white	Chill Insurance	Peadar Healy	Paul Kerrigan	2010	2012
Kerry	Green and gold	Kerry Group	Éamonn Fitzmaurice	Bryan Sheehan	2014	2015
Limerick	Green and white	Sporting Limerick	John Brudair	Iain Corbett	1896	1896
Tipperary	Blue and gold	Intersport	Liam Kearns	Peter Acheson	1920	1935
Waterford	White and blue	3 Mobile	Tom McGlinchey	Tommy Prendergast		1898

== Bracket ==
Quarter-finals
Clare	0-16
Limerick	0-13
Waterford	1-07
Tipperary	1-15

Semi-finals
Clare	0-17
Kerry	2-23
Cork	2-16
Tipperary	3-15

Final
Kerry	3-17
Tipperary	2-10

== Fixtures ==
=== Quarter-finals ===
29 May 2016
3:30 p.m.
First round

Limerick	0-13 - 0-16	Clare
I. Ryan (0-8, 7 frees); D. Neville (0-2, 1 free); C. Sheehan, S. Buckley, S. Cahill (0-1 each).	Report	D. Tubridy (2 frees), J. Malone (0-3 each); K. Sexton, P. Collins, E. Cleary (0-2 each); C. O’Connor, S. Collins, S. McGrath, G. Brennan (0-1 each).

Gaelic Grounds, Limerick
Attendance: 3,343
Referee: P Neilan (Roscommon)
29 May 2016
3:30 p.m.
First round

Waterford	1-7 - 1-15	Tipperary
P Whyte (1-5, 0-3 frees, 0-1 ’45); G Crotty, T Prendergast (0-1 each).	Report	M Quinlivan (0-4); G Hannigan, P Acheson (0-3 each); M O’Gorman (1-0 OG); K O’Halloran (0-2, 0-2 frees); M Dunne, C O’Shaughnessy, B Fox (0-1 each).

Fraher Field, Dungarvan
Attendance: 1,753
Referee: D Gough (Meath)

=== Semi-finals ===
12 June 2016
Semi Final

Kerry	2-23 - 0-17	Clare
S O'Brien 1-5, C Cooper 1-3 (1f), P Geaney 0-5 (1f), BJ Keane, D O'Sullivan, B Sheehan (2f) 0-2 each, P Murphy, K Young, D Moran, A Maher 0-1 each	Report	D Tubridy 0-7 (4f, 2 45), E Cleary (1 sl, 1f) P Lillis 0-3 each, G Brennan 0-2, P Collins, C O'Connor 0-1.

Fitzgerald Stadium, Killarney
Attendance: 11,358
Referee: F Kelly (Longford)
12 June 2016
Semi Final

Cork	2-16 - 3-15	Tipperary
M Collins 2-1, D O'Connor (3fs), P Kerrigan (1f) 0-3 each, C Dorman, C O'Neill (2fs), D Goulding (1f) 0-2 each, B Hurley, J O'Rourke, P Kelleher 0-1 each.	Report	M Quinlivan 1-3 (0-1f), K O'Halloran 0-7 (3fs, 2 45s), B Fox 1-1, C Sweeney 1-0, P Acheson 0-2, C McDonald, B Maher 0-1 each.

Semple Stadium, Thurles
Attendance: 2,734
Referee: P Neilan (Roscommon)
- Tipperary's last victory over Cork in the Munster Senior Football Championship was in 1944.

=== Munster Final ===
3 July 2016
Final

Kerry	3-17 - 2-10	Tipperary
Paul Geaney 2-3, Paul Murphy 1-1, Bryan Sheehan (0-4f), James O’Donoghue (0-3f) 0-4 each, Barry John Keane, Mikey Geaney, Killian Young, Darran O’Sullivan, Stephen O’Brien 0-1 each	Report	Kevin O’Halloran 0-6 (0-4f, 0-1 ’45), Jimmy Feehan, Robbie Kiely 1-0 each, Michael Quinlivan 0-3 (0-2f), Alan Moloney 0-1

Fitzgerald Stadium, Killarney
Attendance: 21,512
Referee: D Gough (Meath)

== See also ==
- 2016 All-Ireland Senior Football Championship
  - 2016 Connacht Senior Football Championship
  - 2016 Leinster Senior Football Championship
  - 2016 Ulster Senior Football Championship
