= 2010 Munster Senior Football Championship =

The 2010 Munster Senior Football Championship was that year's installment of the annual Munster Senior Football Championship held under the auspices of the Munster GAA. Kerry won the title, defeating Limerick in the final. It was Limerick's second consecutive appearance in the final and a second consecutive loss. Limerick had not won a Munster SFC title since 1896.

The winning Kerry team received the Munster Championship Cup, and automatically advanced to the quarter-final stage of the 2010 All-Ireland Senior Football Championship.

== Bracket ==
Quarter-finals
Waterford	1–10
Clare	0–9
Tipperary	2–6
Kerry	2–18

Semi-finals
Limerick	1–17
Waterford	1–9
Cork	1–14
Kerry	1–15

Final
Limerick	1–14
Kerry	1–17

== Quarter-finals ==
16 May 2010
Quarter-final

Tipperary	2–6 – 2–18	Kerry
B Grogan 1-3, P Austin 1-0, P Acheson, G Hannigan, B Mulvihill 0-1 each.	Report	B Sheehan 2-5, C Cooper 0-5, P Galvin, BJ Keane 0-2 each, K Donaghy, Declan O'Sullivan, D Walsh, S Scanlon 0-1 each.

Semple Stadium, Thurles
Attendance: 4,965
Referee: David Coldrick (Meath)
23 May 2010
Quarter-final

Waterford	1–10 – 0–9	Clare
G Hurney 1-1, B Wall, P Hurney 0-3 each, W Hennessy, T Prendergast, R Ahearne 0-1 each.	Report	D Tubridy 0-4, G Brennan, M O'Shea 0-2 each, A Clohessy 0-1. D Callinan SO

Fraher Field, Dungarvan
Referee: A. Mangan (Kerry)

== Semi-finals ==
6 June 2010
Semi-final

Waterford	1–9 - 1–17	Limerick
B Wall 0-4, G Hurney 1-0, T Grey 0-2, C McGrath, R Ahearne, K Power 0-1 each.	Report	G Collins 1-4, I Ryan, C Fitzgerald 0-3 each, S Lavin 0-2, M O'Riordan, P Browne, S Buckley, S Kelly, E O'Connor 0-1 each.

Fraher Field, Dungarvan
Referee: Syl Doyle (Wexford)
6 June 2010
Semi-final

Kerry	0–15 - 0–15	Cork
B Sheehan 0-6, C Cooper 0-4, T O Se 0-2, Declan O'Sullivan, BJ Keane, A Maher 0-1 each.	Report	P Kerrigan, D Goulding, P Kissane 0-3 each, D O'Connor 0-2, P Kelly, P O'Neill, A O'Connor, C O'Neill 0-1 each.

FitzGerald Stadium, Killarney
Attendance: 35,782
Referee: Pádraig Hughes (Armagh)
13 June 2010
Semi-final replay

Kerry	1–15 - 1–14	Cork
C Cooper 0-6, K Donaghy 1-1, B Sheehan 0-3, Declan O'Sullivan, BJ Keane 0-2 each, M O Se 0-1.	Report	D Goulding 1-3, D O'Connor 0-4, C Sheehan 0-2, M Shields, P Kelly, F Goold, N O'Leary, J Hayes 0-1 each.

Páirc Uí Chaoimh, Cork
Attendance: 26,486
Referee: Pat McEnaney (Monaghan)

== Final ==
4 July 2010
Final

Limerick	1–14 - 1–17	Kerry
G Collins 0-5, J Galvin 1-2, B Scanlon, J Ryan 0-2 each, J O'Donovan, S Kelly, S Buckley 0-1 each	Report	C Cooper 1-5, Declan O'Sullivan 0-3, B Sheehan, M McCarthy, T O Se 0-2 each, Darran O'Sullivan, M Quirke, D Moran 0-01 each

FitzGerald Stadium, Killarney
Attendance: 23,864
Referee: Patrick Fox (Westmeath)
