= Francis McInerney =

Irish Gaelic football player from County Clare

Personal information
- Born: County Clare, Ireland

Sport
- Sport: Gaelic football
- Position: -Center Forward
Club
- Years: Club
- Doonbeg
Club titles
- Clare titles: 7
- Munster titles: 1
Inter-county
- Years: County
- 1986-...: Clare
Inter-county titles
- Munster titles: 1
- All Stars: 0

McInerney, Francis was a Gaelic footballer from Doonbeg County Clare. He won a Munster Senior Football Championship as captain in 1992 when Clare had a surprise win over Kerry in the final.

At club level he played with Doonbeg and had much success. He won Clare Senior Football Championship in 1988, 1991, 1995, 1996, 1998, 1999 and 2001, he also won a Munster Senior Club Football Championship and played in losing finals in 1991 and 1999.
