= Con Fitzgerald =

Irish Gaelic footballer

Personal information
- Native name: Conn Mac Gearailt (Irish)
- Born: 16 August 1872 Glin, County Limerick, Ireland
- Died: 14 December 1953 (aged 81) Glin, County Limerick, Ireland
- Occupation: Commercial traveller

Sport
- Sport: Gaelic football
Club
- Years: Club
- Commercials
Inter-county
- Years: County
- Limerick
Inter-county titles
- Munster titles: 1
- All-Irelands: 1

Cornelius Fitzgerald (2 August 1872 – 14 December 1953) was an Irish Gaelic footballer. His championship career with the Limerick senior team lasted several seasons in the 1890s.

Fitzgerald had his greatest success on the inter-county scene with Limerick during the 1896 championship. He captained the team that year and won his sole All-Ireland medal that year as Limerick defeated Dublin in the final. Fitzgerald also won a Munster medal that year.

== Honours ==
Limerick

- All-Ireland Senior Football Championship (1): 1896 (c)
- Munster Senior Football Championship (1): 1896 (c)

Sporting positions
Preceded by	Limerick Senior Football Captain; 1896	Succeeded by
Achievements
Preceded by Paddy Finn	All-Ireland Senior Football Final winning captain 1896	Succeeded by P. J. Walsh
