= 2009 Munster Senior Football Championship =

The 2009 Munster Senior Football Championship was that year's installment of the annual Munster Senior Football Championship held under the auspices of the Munster GAA. Cork won the title, defeating Limerick in the final to retain the title for the first time in 14 years. Limerick had not won a Munster SFC title since 1896. After Cork's defeat of Kerry in the semi-final there were concerns that Kerry football was in "terminal decline."

The winning Cork team received the Munster Championship Cup, and automatically advanced to the quarter-final stage of the 2009 All-Ireland Senior Football Championship.

== Bracket ==
Quarter-finals
Waterford	1–7
Cork	2–18
Tipperary	1–9
Limerick	1–11

Semi-finals
Cork	1–17
Kerry	0–12
Clare	1–9
Limerick	1–13

Final
Cork	2–6
Limerick	0–11

== Quarter-finals ==
24 May 2009
Quarter-final

Tipperary	1–9 – 1–11	Limerick
B Coen 1-2, B Grogan 0-4, H Coghlan, A Fitzgerald, B Mulvihill 0-1 each	Report	I Ryan 1-2, G Collins 0-4, C Joyce-Power 0-2, P Ranahan, S Lucey, K O'Callaghan 0-1 each

Semple Stadium, Thurles
24 May 2009
Quarter-final

Waterford	1–7 – 2–18	Cork
S Walsh 1-0, B Wall 0-2, S O'Hare, W Hennessy, S Cunningham, M O'Gorman, G Hurney 0-1 each	Report	D O'Connor 1-5, P Kerrigan 1-2, J Miskella 0-3, J Masters, D Goulding, C O'Neill 0-2 each, M Shields, P O'Flynn 0-1 each

Fraher Field, Dungarvan

== Semi-finals ==
7 June 2009
Semi-final

Clare	1–9 – 1–13	Limerick
D Tubridy 0-4, G Brennan 1-0, G Quinlan 0-2, Gordon Kelly, E Coughlan, M O’Shea 0-1 each	Report	I Ryan 0-6, S Lavin 1-0, G Collins 0-3, S Lucey, J O’Donovan, S Buckely, E Hogan 0-1 each

Cusack Park, Ennis
7 June 2009
Semi-final

Kerry	0–13 – 1–10	Cork
B Sheehan 0-5, C Cooper 0-3, D Walsh 0-2, T Walsh, T Kennelly, D Ó Sé 0-1 each	Report	P O'Neill 1-2, D O'Connor 0-3, D Goulding 0-2, G Canty, N O'Leary, C O'Neill 0-1 each

FitzGerald Stadium, Killarney
13 June 2009
Semi-final replay

Cork	1–17 – 0–12	Kerry
D O'Connor 1-5, D Goulding 0-5, J Miskella 0-2, P Kelly, P Kerrigan, J Masters, F Goold, P O'Flynn 0-1 each, N O'Leary SO	Report	C Cooper 0-4, Darren O'Sullivan, B Sheehan 0-2 each, Declan O'Sullivan, T Kennelly, D Moran, D Ó Sé 0-1 each, P Galvin SO

Páirc Uí Chaoimh, Cork

== Final ==
5 July 2009
Final

Limerick	0–11 – 2–6	Cork
I Ryan 0-4, S Buckley 0-3, S Lavin, P Ranahan, G Collins, S Kelly 0-1 each	Report	D Goulding 1-3, D O'Connor 1-1, J Masters, C O'Neill 0-1 each

Páirc Uí Chaoimh, Cork
Attendance: 20,676
Referee: R Hickey (Clare)

== Miscellaneous ==
- Revert to open draw until 2013.
