= 2011 Munster Senior Football Championship =

Sports event

The 2011 Munster Senior Football Championship was that year's installment of the annual Munster Senior Football Championship held under the auspices of the Munster GAA. It was won by Kerry who defeated Cork in the final. This was Kerry's second consecutive appearance in the final and second consecutive title - they defeated Limerick in the 2010 final.

The winning Kerry team received the Munster Championship Cup, and automatically advanced to the quarter-final stage of the 2011 All-Ireland Senior Football Championship.

== Bracket ==
Quarter-finals
Tipperary	0-11
Kerry	2-16
Clare	0-11
Cork	1-23

Semi-finals
Kerry	1-26
Limerick	3-9
Waterford	2-8
Cork	5-17

Final
Kerry	1-15
Cork	1-12

== Quarter-finals ==
22 May 2011
3:30pm
Quarter Final

Kerry	2-16 - 0-11	Tipperary
C Cooper 0-5 (2f), B Sheehan 2-1 (1-0 pen, 1f), Darran O'Sullivan, Declan O'Sullivan 0-3 each, K O'Leary, E Brosnan, A O'Mahony, D Walsh 0-1 each	Report	B Grogan (2f) 0-3, C Sweeney (1f), P Austin 0-2 each, B Fox, G Hannigan, B Mulvihill, P Acheson 0-1 each

Fitzgerald Stadium, Killarney
Attendance: 9,500
Referee: M Condon (Waterford)
22 May 2011
3:30pm
Quarter Final

Cork	1-23 - 0-11	Clare
D Goulding 0-8 (6f), D O'Connor 1-4 (0-2f), C Sheehan 0-4, P O'Neill 0-2, A Walsh, A O'Connor, M Shields, P Kerrigan, J Miskella all 0-1 each	Report	R Donnelly 0-5, D Tubridy 0-3 (1f), G Brennan 0-2, A Clohessy 0-1.

Páirc Uí Chaoimh, Cork
Attendance: 4,186
Referee: E Kinsella (Laois)

== Semi-finals ==
4 June 2011
Semi Final

Kerry	1-26 - 3-9	Limerick
C Cooper 0-7 ( 0-1 free), Darran O'Sullivan 1-3, Declan O'Sullivan 0-4, B Sheehan (0-1 '45), K Donaghy, K O'Leary 0-2 each, K Young, P Galvin, B J Keane, E Brosnan, D Bohan, D Geaney 0-1 each	Report	G Collins 1-4 (0-1 free), S Buckley, S O'Carroll 1-0, S Kelly (0-1f), J O'Donovan J McCarthy, S Gallagher, M Sheehan 0-1 each

Páirc na nGael, Limerick
Attendance: 6,800
Referee: R Hickey (Clare)
5 June 2011
Semi Final

Cork	5-17 - 2-8	Waterford
D Goulding 2-2, P Kerrigan 1-3, J Miskella 1-2, F Goold 1-0, F Lynch, D Goold 0-2 each, P Kelly, A Walsh, C Sheehan, E Cotter, D O'Connor (0-1f), G Spillane 0-1 each	Report	B Wall (1-0f), G Hurney (1-0 pen) 1-1 each, T Prendergast, S Fleming (0-1f) 0-2 each, S Briggs, B Phelan 0-1 each

Páirc Uí Chaoimh, Cork
Attendance: 3,365
Referee: P Fox (Westmeath)

== Final ==
3 July 2011
Final

Kerry	1-15 - 1-12	Cork
Declan O'Sullivan 0-5, Darran O'Sullivan 1-0, C Cooper (1f) B Sheehan, K Donaghy 0-2 each, K O'Leary, D Walsh, E Brosnan, J O'Donoghue 0-1 each	Report	D Goulding 0-5 (3f), D O'Connor 1-1 (1-0 pen), P Kerrigan 0-3, C Sheehan, A O'Connor, P Kelly 0-1 each

FitzGerald Stadium, Killarney
Attendance: 40,892
Referee: D Coldrick (Meath)

== See also ==
- Cork–Kerry Gaelic football rivalry
