= 2013 Munster Senior Football Championship =

Munster Senior football championship

The 2013 Munster Senior Football Championship was that year's installment of the annual Munster Senior Football Championship held under the auspices of the Munster GAA. It was won by Kerry who defeated Cork in the final. It was Kerry's 75th title. Cork defeated Limerick and Clare, while Kerry defeated Tipperary and Waterford on their way to the final. The winning Kerry team received the Munster Championship Cup, and automatically advanced to the quarter-final stage of the 2013 All-Ireland Senior Football Championship.

== Bracket ==
Quarter-finals
Limerick	0-8
Cork	3-17
Kerry	2-19
Tipperary	0-8

Semi-finals
Clare	1-11
Cork	1-20
Waterford	1-4
Kerry	4-21

Final
Cork	0-17
Kerry	1-16

== Quarter-finals ==
25 May 2013
Quarter-Final

Limerick	0-08 - 3-17	Cork
J Galvin (0-01), S Buckley (0-01), G Collins (0-01), E O'Connor (0-03, 0-01f), M Sheehan (0-01), S Lucey (0-01).	Report	D Cahalane (0-02, 0-01f, 0-01'45), P O'Neill (1-00), C Sheehan (0-01), J O'Rourke (1-01); D Goulding (0-05, 0-01f), B Hurley (1-01), P Kerrigan (0-02), F Goold (0-02), M Collins (0-03).

Gaelic Grounds, Limerick
Referee: Michael Duffy (Sligo)

26 May 2013
Quarter-Final

Kerry	2-19 - 0-08	Tipperary
J O'Donoghue 1-3, C Cooper 0-5 (1f), J Buckley 0-3 (2f), Darran O'Sullivan 1-0, P Galvin 0-2, D Walsh 0-1, A Maher 0-1, K Donaghy 0-1, T Ó Sé 0-1, Declan O'Sullivan 0-1, B Sheehan 0-1 (1 45')	Report	B Grogan 0-3 (2f, 1 45'), C Sweeney 0-3 (3f), P Austin 0-1, C McDonald 0-1

Fitzgerald Stadium, Killarney
Referee: Connor Lane (Cork)

== Semi-finals ==
1 June 2013
Semi-Final

Kerry	4-21 - 1-4	Waterford
B. Sheehan 1-01, C. Cooper, J. Buckley 0-04 each, K. Donaghy, A. Maher, Declan O'Sullivan 1-00 each, T. Ó Sé, P. Galvin, J. O'Donoghue 0-02 each, M. Ó Sé, F. Fitzgearld, P. Crowley, D. Walsh, Darren O'Sullivan, K. O'Leary 0-01 each	Report	T. Grey 1-01, P. Whyte 0-02, S. Aherne 0-01

Fitzgerald Stadium, Killarney
Referee: Martin Higgins (Fermanagh)

16 June 2013
Semi-Final

Clare	1-11 - 1-20	Cork
D. Tubridy 0-04, G. Brennan 1-00, I. McInerney 0-02, J. Hayes, R. Donnelly, C. Dunning, S. McGrath, J. Keane 0-01 each	Report	D. Goulding 1-05, B. Hurley 0-05, F. Goold 0-04, P. Kerrigan, J. O'Rourke 0-02 each, C. Sheehan, D. O'Connor 0-01 each

Cusack Park, Ennis
Referee: Derek Fahy (Longford)

== Final ==
7 July 2013
Final

Kerry	1-16 - 0-17	Cork
C Cooper 1-03 (3f), J O'Donoghue 0-03, Declan O'Sullivan 0-02, B Kealy (1f), M O'Sé, P Crowley, A Maher, J Buckley (1f), P Galvin, Darran O'Sullivan and B Sheehan (1f) 0-01 each	Report	D Goulding 0-07 (4f, 2 ’45), J Loughrey, D O'Connor (1f), B Hurley 0-02 each, A Walsh, J O'Rourke, P Kerrigan and C Sheahan 0-01 each

Fitzgerald Stadium, Killarney
Attendance: 36,370
Referee: Marty Duffy (Sligo)

== Miscellaneous ==
Remains an open draw since 2009 moving to seeded draw for 2014 due Waterford having a 1 sided defeat to Kerry.
