= Fionn Fitzgerald =

Irish Gaelic footballer

Personal information
- Native name: Fionn Mac Gearailt (Irish)
- Born: 27 April 1990 (age 36) Killarney, County Kerry, Ireland
- Occupation: Lecturer
- Height: 5 ft 9 in (175 cm)

Sport
- Sport: Gaelic Football
- Position: Left corner-back
Club
- Years: Club
- 2007-present: Dr. Crokes
Club titles
- Kerry titles: 9
- Munster titles: 6
- All-Ireland Titles: 1
Inter-county*
Years	County	Apps (scores)
2013-2018	Kerry	11 (0-2)
Inter-county titles
- Munster titles: 5
- All-Irelands: 1
- NFL: 1
- All Stars: 0
- *Inter County team apps and scores correct as of 22:11, 21 September 2014.

Fionn Fitzgerald (born 27 April 1990) is an Irish Gaelic footballer who plays as a left corner-back with the Kerry senior team.

Born in Killarney, County Kerry, Fitzgerald first played competitive Gaelic football during his schooling at St. Brendan's College. He arrived on the inter-county scene at the age of seventeen when he first linked up with the Kerry minor team. He made his senior debut during the 2013 National Football League. Since then Fitzgerald has become a regular member of the team and has won one All-Ireland medal and two Munster medals. He co-captained the team to the All-Ireland title in 2014.

At club level, Fitzgerald is a three-time Munster medallist with Dr. Crokes. In addition to this, he has also won four championship medals.

Sporting positions
Preceded by Colm Cooper	Kerry Senior Football Co-Captain; 2014	Succeeded by Kieran Donaghy
Achievements
Preceded by Stephen Cluxton (Dublin)	All-Ireland Senior Football Final winning co-captain with Kieran O'Leary; 2014	Succeeded by Stephen Cluxton (Dublin)
