= Munster Senior Football Championship =

Annual Gaelic football competition in Ireland

- Current season or competition: 2026 Munster Senior Football Championship
- Irish: Craobh Peile na Mumhan
- Code: Gaelic football
- Founded: 1888; 138 years ago
- Region: Munster (GAA)
- Trophy: Corn Pháidí Uí Shé
- No. of teams: 6
- Title holders: Kerry (87th title)
- Most titles: Kerry (87 titles)
- Sponsors: SuperValu, Allianz, AIB
- TV partner(s): RTÉ; GAA+
- Motto: Experience The Unforgettable
- Official website: munster.gaa.ie

The Munster Senior Football Championship, known simply as the Munster Championship and shortened to Munster SFC, is an annual inter-county Gaelic football competition organised by the Munster Council of the Gaelic Athletic Association (GAA). It is the highest inter-county Gaelic football competition in the province of Munster, and has been contested every year, bar one, since the 1888 championship.

The final, currently held on the fourth Saturday in June, serves as the culmination of a series of games played during May and June, and the results determine which team receives the championship. The winners traditionally received the Munster Cup, however beginning in 2026 a new trophy was introduced, the Corn Pháidí Uí Shé, named after legendary Kerry footballer and manager Páidí Ó Sé. The championship has always been played on a straight knockout basis whereby once a team loses they are eliminated from the championship.

The Munster SFC is an integral part of the wider All-Ireland Senior Football Championship. The winners and runners-up of the Munster SFC, like their counterparts in Connacht, Leinster and Ulster, are rewarded by advancing directly to the All-Ireland group stage. Each of the other defeated teams, depending on their league ranking, advance to the All-Ireland SFC, or to the second-tier Tailteann Cup.

Six teams currently participate in the Munster SFC. The title has been won at least once by all six of the Munster counties, four of which have won the title more than once. Kerry have won the most titles, with 87 in total. Kerry are the three-time title holders, having defeated Clare by 4–20 to 0–21 in the 2025 final.

== History ==
=== Development ===
Following the foundation of the Gaelic Athletic Association in 1884, new rules for Gaelic football and hurling were drawn up and published in the United Irishman newspaper. In 1886, county committees began to be established, with several counties affiliating over the next few years. The GAA ran its inaugural All-Ireland Senior Football Championship in 1887. The decision to establish that first championship was influenced by several factors. Firstly, inter-club contests in 1885 and 1886 were wildly popular and began to draw huge crowds. Clubs started to travel across the country to play against each other and these matches generated intense interest as the newspapers began to speculate which teams might be considered the best in the country. Secondly, although the number of clubs was growing, many were slow to affiliate to the Association, leaving it short of money. Establishing a central championship held the prospect of enticing GAA clubs to process their affiliations, just as the establishment of the FA Cup had done much in the 1870s to promote the development of the Football Association in England. The championships were open to all affiliated clubs who would first compete in county-based competitions, to be run by local county committees. The winners of each county championship would then proceed to represent that county in the All-Ireland series. For the first and only time in its history the All-Ireland Championship used an open draw format. Six teams entered the first championship, however, this number increased to nine in 1888. Because of this, and in an effort to reduce travelling costs, the GAA decided to introduce provincial championships.

=== Beginnings ===
The inaugural Munster Championship featured Clare, Cork, Limerick, Tipperary and Waterford. Cork and Tipperary contested the first match on Sunday 27 May 1888, as part of a hurling-football double-header between the counties at Buttevant. Clare defeated Limerick in the first semi-final, however, Limerick were later awarded the game as Clare champions Newmarket-on-Fergus used players from other clubs to supplement their team. Such a format was not yet allowed. The inaugural Munster SFC final between Tipperary and Limerick was to be played on Saturday 10 November 1888, however, no game was played as Tipperary received a walkover from Limerick.

Postponements, disqualifications, objections, withdrawals and walkovers were regular occurrences during the initial years of the championship. Kerry became the sixth and final team to enter the championship in 1889. On Sunday 6 October 1889, the first Munster SFC final took place. Tipperary won their first title on the field of play after a 1–2 to 0–3 defeat of Cork. Since then the championship title has been awarded every year, except in 1921, when the championship was cancelled due to the ongoing Civil War.

=== Team dominance ===
The championship has been dominated by Kerry, and to a lesser extent Cork, who have won the title every year since 1936, with the exception of victories by Tipperary in 2020 and Clare in 1992.

Limerick have lost too many Munster SFC finals since 1896, but Waterford have been without a Munster SFC final appearance since 1960.

The first 15 years of the Munster SFC saw the most equitable era in its history with five of the six participating teams claiming the title. Cork led the way by claiming seven titles, closely followed by five for Tipperary, who also became the first team to retain the title. Limerick, Waterford and Kerry all claimed one title apiece during this era. In winning the 1903 Munster SFC final, Kerry claimed the first of a new record of three successive titles and set in train a level of championship dominance that continues to the present day. This record was bested in each of the following decades with Kerry winning four-a-in-a-row between 1912 and 1915, five-in-a-row between 1923 and 1927, six-in-a-row between 1929 and 1934, seven-in-a-row between 1936 and 1942 and eight-in-a-row between 1958 and 1965. The dominance continued with Kerry claiming 20 of the 25 available Munster SFC titles between 1958 and 1982. Since the turn of the 20th century, Cork had claimed titles in almost every decade, including several back-to-back successes, but had never enjoyed a prolonged period of dominance. Cork won the 1987 Munster final, bringing an end to a run of success by a Kerry team that has since come to be regarded as the greatest of all time and securing the first of seven Munster SFC titles over the following nine seasons. For the first time in 100 years, Cork ended the nineties as the "team of the decade" after winning five Munster SFC titles in total. The first two decades of the 21st century has seen Kerry win 15 of a possible 20 Munster SFC titles.

=== Format history ===
The Munster Senior Football Championship has always been a knockout tournament whereby once a team is defeated they are eliminated from the championship. In the early years the pairings were drawn at random and there was no seeding. Each match was played as a single leg. If a match ended in a draw there was a replay. Drawn replays were settled with extra time; however, if both sides were still level at the end of extra time a second replay took place and so on until a winner was found. Extra-time was eventually adopted in the event of a draw for all championship games except the final.

The dominance of Kerry and, to a lesser extent, Cork led to both these teams being seeded on opposite sides of the championship draw. This was later viewed as a mean of penalising the other "weaker" teams. While it might be possible to beat one of these teams it was deemed near impossible to beat the two strongest teams in the province in a single championship season. This practice was eventually abolished for 1991 with a return to the open draw in advance of the 1992 championship, which eventually saw Clare become the first "non-traditional" champions since 1935. In 2020 Tipperary won a Munster SFC title for the first time since 1935.

The Munster Council abandoned the open draw and returned to a system of seeding both Cork and Kerry on opposite sides before the 2008 championship. After an outcry, the open draw was reinstated in 2009 after just one season of seeding. The policy of seeding Cork and Kerry returned once again in 2013, however, it was abandoned after just one season and the open draw has remained in place ever since.

The Munster SFC has always been an integral part of the All-Ireland Senior Football Championship. Between 1888 and 2000 the Munster final winners automatically qualified for the All-Ireland SFC semi-final. The introduction of the All-Ireland Qualifiers system in 2001 allowed the five defeated teams a second chance of qualifying the All-Ireland SFC, while the Munster SFC champions received a bye to the All-Ireland SFC quarter-final.

Waterford no Munster SFC final since 1960 hold the longest record and weakest team in the province to this day.

- 1935 Kerry withdraw due to IRA trouble.
- 1936-1938 Open draw all 6 teams involved.
- 1939 Two First round games, One Quarter-final, one Semi-final with Cork a bye team and Kerry bye to the final.
- 1940 Open draw all 6 teams involved.
- 1941-1942 Limerick not part of the championship due to Foot and Mouth, Kerry were a bye to Munster final in 1941.
- 1943-1948 Open draw all 6 teams involved.
- 1949-1950 Limerick not part of the championship.
- 1951-1952 Open draw all 6 teams involved.
- 1953–1964 Limerick did not take part expect in 1955 Limerick were approved to host Waterford but withdrew match was cancelled due to a dispute over the eligibility of players.
- 1954 Clare skipped a year.
- 1965 Cork and Kerry byes to semi-finals.
- 1966 Kerry and Limerick byes to semi-finals.
- 1967–1979 Seeded draw meaning Cork and Kerry only allowed to meet in the final.
- 1980 Two First round games, One Quarter-final, one Semi-final with Cork a bye team and Kerry bye to the final.
- 1981–1990 Seeded draw meaning Cork and Kerry only allowed to meet in the final.
- 1991–1996 Open draw straight forward.
- 1997–1998 One First round game, One Quarter-final and two Semi-finals.
- 1999–2007 Open draw straight forward.
- 2008 Seeded draw meaning Cork and Kerry only allowed to meet in the final.
- 2009–2013 Open draw straight forward.
- 2014 Seeded draw meaning Cork and Kerry only allowed to meet in the final.
- 2015 Open draw but two teams reach final are byes to semi-final. A straight forward open draw was ruled out due to Waterford's 1 sided defeats to Kerry in 2007 and 2013.

=== Munster SFC moments ===
- Clare 2–10 – 0–12 Kerry (19 July 1992): Clare, who were 1991 Senior B champions and 1992 league quarter-finalists, carried their momentum into the Munster SFC final and defeated Kerry. It was their first Munster SFC title since 1917.
- Cork 1–12 – 0–13 Kerry (8 November 2020): Kerry, aiming for their eight provincial title in a row, were defeated by Cork in the semi-finals.
- Tipperary 0–17 – 0–14 Cork (22 November 2020): Tipperary defeated Cork to secure their first Munster SFC title in 85 years.
- Clare 0–14 – 0–13 Cork (9 April 2023): Clare, who needed to reach the Munster SFC final to qualify for the All-Ireland SFC, beat Cork for the first time since 1997, doing so in the quarter-final.

== Format ==
=== Overview ===
The Munster Senior Football Championship is a single elimination tournament. Each team is afforded only one defeat before being eliminated from the championship. Pairings for matches are drawn at random and there is currently no seeding. Each match is played as a single leg. If a match is drawn there is a period of extra time, however, if both sides are still level at the end of extra time a replay takes place and so on until a winner is found.

=== Progression ===
	Teams entering in this round	Teams advancing from previous round
Quarter-finals (4 teams)	Non-finalists of the previous championship	
Semi-finals (4 teams)	Finalists of the previous championship	2 winners from the quarter-finals
Final (2 teams)		2 winners from the semi-finals

== Qualification for subsequent competitions ==
The Munster SFC champion and runner-up qualify for the All-Ireland Senior Football Championship group stage.

Qualification to the All-Ireland Senior Football Championship and the Tailteann Cup are linked with the provincial championships and the National Football League. The Munster SFC finalists, along with the six other provincial finalists, qualify for the All-Ireland SFC group stage as top seeds. The other eight spots in the All-Ireland SFC are allocated to the Tailteann Cup holders and the seven highest ranked counties in the National Football League that have not qualified. Teams that fail to reach the Munster SFC final and are not ranked high enough in the league qualify for the Tailteann Cup.

== Teams ==
=== 2026 Championship ===
Six counties competed in the 2026 Munster Senior Football Championship:

County team	Location	Stadium	Position in 2026 Championship	Munster SFC titles	Last Munster SFC title	All-Ireland SFC titles	Last All-Ireland SFC title
Clare	Ennis	Cusack Park	Semi-finalist	2	1992	0	—N/a
Cork	Cork	Páirc Uí Chaoimh	Runners-up	37	2012	7	2010
Kerry	Tralee	Austin Stack Park	Winners	87	2026	39	2025
Limerick	Limerick	Gaelic Grounds	Quarter-finalist	1	1896	2	1896
Tipperary	Thurles	Semple Stadium	Semi-finalist	10	2020	4	1920
Waterford	Waterford	Walsh Park	Quarter-finalist	1	1898	0	—N/a

=== List of teams ===
The following teams have competed in the Munster SFC for at least one season.

Team	App.	Debut	Most recent	# of Munster SFC titles	Last Munster SFC title	Best Munster SFC result
Clare		1888	2026	2	1992	Winner
Cork		1888	2026	37	2012	Winner
Kerry		1889	2026	87	2026	Winner
Limerick		1888	2026	1	1896	Winner
Tipperary		1888	2026	10	2020	Winner
Waterford		1888	2026	1	1898	Winner

=== Personnel and kits ===
County team	Manager	Captain(s)	Sponsors
Clare	Peter Keane	Cillian Brennan	Pat O'Donnell
Cork	John Cleary	Brian Hurley	Sports Direct
Kerry	Jack O'Connor	Gavin White	Kerry Group
Limerick	Jimmy Lee	Cillian Fahy	None
Tipperary	Niall Fitzgerald	Stephen O'Brien	Fiserv
Waterford	Ephie Fitzgerald	Conor Murray	Cognizant

== Trophy and medals ==
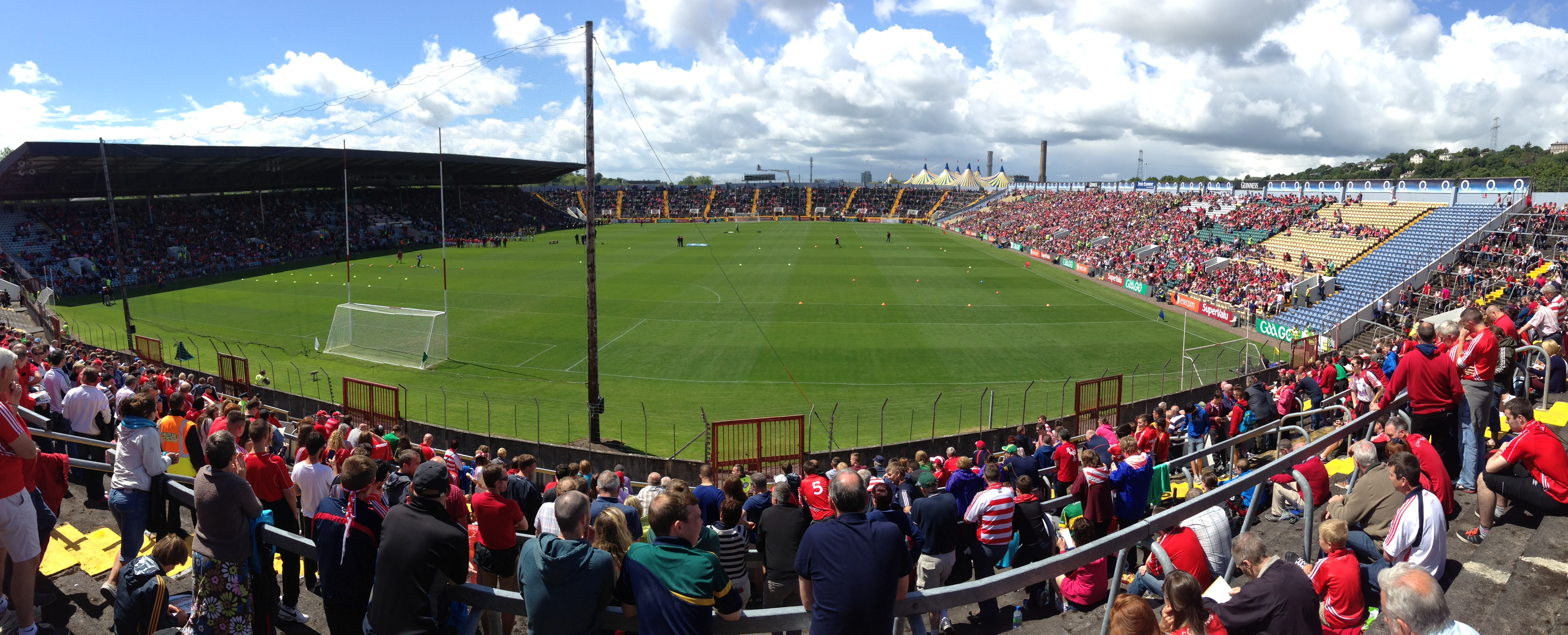
View from the Blackrock End terrace of the old Páirc Uí Chaoimh during the 2014 Munster final between Cork and Kerry

=== Trophy ===
At the end of the Munster SFC final, the winning team is presented with a trophy. The Munster Cup is held by the winning team until the following year's final. Traditionally, the presentation is made at a special rostrum in the stand where GAA and political dignitaries and special guests view the match.

The cup is decorated with ribbons in the colours of the winning team. During the game the cup actually has both teams' sets of ribbons attached and the runners-up ribbons are removed before the presentation. The winning captain accepts the cup on behalf of his team before giving a short speech. Individual members of the winning team then have an opportunity to come to the rostrum to lift the cup.

The present Munster Cup was first used in 1928, when it was donated by the Munster Council. In 2013, there was a debate around naming the cup in honour of a former player or administrator, however, this was rejected. In March 2021, the Munster Council deferred a decision to name the trophy, with Michael Hogan and Páidí Ó Sé the two names proposed.

=== Medals ===
In accordance with GAA rules, the Munster Council awards up to 26 gold medals to the winners of the Munster SFC final.

== List of finals ==
=== Key ===
All-Ireland SFC winner
All-Ireland SFC runner-up

=== List of Munster SFC finals ===
Year	Date	Winner		Runner-up		Venue	Winning captain(s)	Winning margin	Attendance	Referee
Year	Date	County team	Score	County team	Score	Venue	Winning captain(s)	Winning margin	Attendance	Referee
1888		Tipperary	w/o	Limerick	scr.		Gil Kavanagh	Tipperary awarded		
1889	6 October	Tipperary	0–3	Cork	0–2	Mallow Town Park	Gil Kavanagh	1		
1890; R	28 September; 19 October	Cork	0-0; 1–4	Kerry	0-0; 0–1	Raheen; Banteer Sportsfield	Jim Power	4		
1891	1 November	Cork	1–5	Waterford	0–4	Youghal Sportsfield	Con O'Leary	4		
1892	4 December	Kerry	1–6	Cork	1–3	Páirc Mac Gearailt	JP O'Sullivan	3		
1893	1 April 1894	Cork	2–3	Kerry	1–4	Mallow Town Park	Jack O'Keeffe	9		
1894; R	2 December 1894; 3 March 1895	Cork	0-6; 1–7	Tipperary	0-2; 1–3	Limerick; Charleville Sportsfield	John O'Leary	4		Mr Trownsell, (Limerick)
1895	23 February 1896	Tipperary	0–5	Limerick	0–3	Kilmallock Sportsfield	Paddy Finn	2		
1896	21 November 1897	Limerick	0–4	Waterford	0–1	Mallow Town Park	Con Fitzgerald	3		
1897	25 September 1898	Cork	0–5	Limerick	0–3	Tipperary Sportsfield	Danny O'Donovan	2		
1898	24 September 1899	Waterford	1–3	Cork	0–4	Castle Grounds	James Wall	2		
1899 (R)2	14 October; 18 November 1900; 17 November 1901	Cork	1–9; 1-2; 3-11	Tipperary	2–1; 0-1; 0-1	Tipperary Grounds; Markets Field	Dan Coughlan	19		P.J. Hayes, (Limerick); J.Wall (W)
1900	11 May 1902	Tipperary	2–4	Kerry	2–1	Markets Field	Jack Tobin	3		J.Fitzgerald
1901	19 April 1903	Cork	1–9	Limerick	1–6	Tipperary Sportsfield	Jim Murphy	3		
1902 (R)	4 October; 1 November 1903	Tipperary	1–4; 2–4	Kerry	1–4; 0–3	Turners Cross	Bob Quane	7		J. Fitzgerald
1903	30 October 1904	Kerry	0–5	Cork	0–3	Markets Field	Thady O'Gorman	2		
1904 (R)	10 December 1905; 7 January 1906	Kerry	0–3; 2–3	Waterford	0–3; 0–2	Cork Athletic Grounds; Fraher Field	Austin Stack	7		
1905	7 April 1907	Kerry	2–10	Limerick	1–6	Tralee Sportsfield	Maurice McCarthy	7		
1906	18 August 1907	Cork	1–10	Kerry	0–3	Tipperary Sportsfield	Martin O'Connor	10		
1907	26 April 1908	Cork	1–7	Tipperary	0–1	Fraher Field	Billy Mackesy	9		P. Naughton (L)
1908	6 December	Kerry	0–7	Waterford	0–2	Cork Athletic Grounds	Con Healy	5		
1909 (R)	19 September; 7 November	Kerry	2–8; 1-6	Cork	1–7; 0-6	Markets Field; Cork Athletic Grounds	Tom Costello	3		
1910	30 October	Kerry	0–4	Cork	0–2	Cork Athletic Grounds	Tom Costello	2		
1911	29 October	Cork	2–5	Waterford	0–1	Fraher Field	Mick Mehigan	10		
1912	20 October	Kerry	0–3	Clare	0–1	Cusack Park	Dick Fitzgerald	2		
1913	26 October	Kerry	1–6	Cork	0–1	Cork Athletic Grounds	Dick Fitzgerald	8		
1914	4 October	Kerry	0–5	Cork	0–1	Tralee Sportsfield	Dick Fitzgerald	4		
1915	17 October	Kerry	4–3	Clare	0–1	Tipperary Sportsfield	Dick Fitzgerald	14		
1916	3 September	Cork	2–2	Clare	1–4	Clonmel Sportsfield	Paddy O'Connell	1		
1917	14 October	Clare	5–4	Cork	0–1	Tipperary Sportsfield		15		
1918	22 September	Tipperary	1–1	Kerry	0–1	Cork Athletic Grounds	Ned O'Shea	3		M. Mehigan (Cork)
1919	3 August	Kerry	6–11	Clare	2–0	Cusack Park	Con Clifford	20		
1920	9 April 1922	Tipperary	2–2	Kerry	0–2	Cork Athletic Grounds	Ned O'Shea	6		W. Walsh (Waterford)
1921		No championship								
1922	1 July 1923	Tipperary	1–7	Limerick	0–1	Thurles Sportsfield	Ned O'Shea	9		W. P. Aherne (Cork)
1923	14 October	Kerry	0–5	Tipperary	0–3	Tralee Sportsfield	John O'Mahony	2		W. P. Aherne (Cork)
1924	12 October	Kerry	5–8	Clare	2–2	Markets Field	Phil O'Sullivan	15		
1925	13 September	Kerry	5–5	Clare	0–0	Killarney Sportsfield	Tom O'Mahony	20		
1926	25 July	Kerry	0–11	Tipperary	1–4	Cork Athletic Grounds	John Joe Sheehy	4		S. Hogan (W)
1927	11 September	Kerry	4–4	Clare	1–3	The Cricket Field	Joe Barrett	10		
1928	5 August	Cork	4–3	Tipperary	0–4	Fraher Field		11		P. Whelan (W)
1929	14 July	Kerry	1–14	Clare	1–2	Killarney Sportsfield	Joe Barrett	12		
1930	10 August	Kerry	3–4	Tipperary	1–2	Tipperary Sportsfield	John Joe Sheehy	8		S. Hogan (W)
1931	9 August	Kerry	5–8	Tipperary	0–2	Tralee Sportsfield	Con Brosnan	21		S. Malone (Clare)
1932	7 August	Kerry	3–10	Tipperary	1–4	Carrick Sportsfield	Miko Doyle	12		S. Hogan (W)
1933	13 August	Kerry	2–8	Tipperary	1–4	Clonmel Sportsfield	Miko Doyle	7		P. O'Donnell (W)
1934	29 July	Kerry	1–14	Limerick	1–2	Listowel Sportsfield	Dan O'Keeffe	12		
1935	21 July	Tipperary	2–8	Cork	1–2	Páirc Mac Gearailt	Dick Power	9		D. Ryan (Kerry)
1936	26 July	Kerry	1–11	Clare	2–2	Gaelic Grounds	Dan O'Keeffe	6		
1937	18 July	Kerry	4–9	Clare	1–1	Gaelic Grounds	Miko Doyle	17		
1938	7 August	Kerry	4–14	Cork	1–6	Clonakilty Sportsfield	Bill Kinnerk	17		
1939	23 July	Kerry	2–11	Tipperary	0–4	Clonmel Sportsfield	Tom O'Connor	13		D. Goode (W)
1940	21 July	Kerry	1–10	Waterford	0–6	Waterford Sportsfield	Dan Spring	7		
1941	10 August	Kerry	2–9	Clare	0–6	Gaelic Grounds	Bill Dillon	9		
1942	19 July	Kerry	3–7	Cork	0–8	Tralee Sportsfield	Tom O'Connor	8		
1943	25 July	Cork	1–7	Tipperary	1–4	Páirc Mac Gearailt	Tadhgo Crowley	3		T. Greaney (W)
1944	9 July	Kerry	1–6	Tipperary	0–5	Gaelic Grounds	Paddy Bawn Brosnan	4		P. McKenna (Limerick)
1945	8 July	Cork	1–11	Kerry	1–6	Fitzgerald Stadium	Tadhg Crowley	5	7,000	
1946	21 July	Kerry	2–16	Waterford	2–1	Austin Stack Park	Eddie Dowling	15		
1947	27 July	Kerry	3–8	Cork	2–6	Cork Athletic Grounds	Jackie Lyne	5		
1948	25 July	Kerry	2–9	Cork	2–6	Fitzgerald Stadium	Joe Keohane	3		
1949	31 July	Cork	3–6	Clare	0–7	Gaelic Grounds	John O'Keeffe	8		
1950	30 July	Kerry	2–5	Cork	1–5	Cork Athletic Grounds	Jackie Lyne	3		
1951	15 July	Kerry	1–6	Cork	0–4	Fitzgerald Stadium	John Joe Sheehan	5		
1952	20 July	Cork	0–11	Kerry	0–2	Cork Athletic Grounds	Éamonn Young	9		
1953	19 July	Kerry	2–7	Cork	2–3	Fitzgerald Stadium	Paudie Sheehy	4		
1954	25 July	Kerry	4–9	Cork	2–3	Cork Athletic Grounds	John Dowling	12		
1955	24 July	Kerry	0–14	Cork	2–6	Fitzgerald Stadium	John Dowling	2		
1956 (R)	15 July; 29 July	Cork	0–8; 1–8	Kerry	2–2; 1–7	Cork Athletic Grounds; Fitzgerald Stadium	Donal O'Sullivan	1		
1957	21 July	Cork	0–16	Waterford	1–2	Thurles Sportsfield	Nealie Duggan	11		
1958	13 July	Kerry	2–7	Cork	0–3	Cork Athletic Grounds	Mick Murphy	10	21,858	P. Silke (Limerick)
1959	2 August	Kerry	2–15	Cork	2–8	Fitzgerald Stadium	Mick O'Connell	7	26,184	Tom Cunningham (Waterford)
1960	24 July	Kerry	3–15	Waterford	0–8	Cork Athletic Grounds	Paudie Sheehy	16	8,100	A Carroll (Clare)
1961 (R)	16 July; 23 July	Kerry	0–10; 2–13	Cork	1–7; 1–4	Cork Athletic Grounds; Fitzgerald Stadium	Niall Sheehy	12	17,500; 27,852	A Carroll (Clare)
1962	15 July	Kerry	4–8	Cork	0–4	Cork Athletic Grounds	Seán Óg Sheehy	16	25,090	M Colbert (Limerick)
1963	14 July	Kerry	1–18	Cork	3–7	Fitzgerald Stadium	Niall Sheehy	5	22,847	J Martin (Roscommon)
1964	19 July	Kerry	2–11	Cork	1–8	Cork Athletic Grounds	Niall Sheehy	6	26,023	J Hatton (Wicklow)
1965	18 July	Kerry	2–16	Limerick	2–7	Gaelic Grounds	Jer D. O'Connor	9		John Dowling (Offaly)
1966	17 July	Cork	2–7	Kerry	1–7	Fitzgerald Stadium	Jerry O'Sullivan	3		J Martin (Roscommon)
1967	16 July	Cork	0–8	Kerry	0–7	Cork Athletic Grounds	Denis Coughlan	1	15,000	J. Martin (Tyrone)
1968	14 July	Kerry	1–21	Cork	3–8	Fitzgerald Stadium	Pat Griffin	7		J. Dowling (Offaly)
1969	20 July	Kerry	0–16	Cork	1–4	Cork Athletic Grounds	Johnny Culloty	9	29,985	J Moloney (Tipperary)
1970	26 July	Kerry	2–22	Cork	2–9	Fitzgerald Stadium	Donie O'Sullivan	13		J Moloney (Tipperary)
1971	18 July	Cork	0–25	Kerry	0–14	Cork Athletic Grounds	Mick Scannell	11	28,347	Sean O'Connor (Limerick)
1972	16 July	Kerry	2–21	Cork	2–15	Fitzgerald Stadium	Tom Prendergast	6	29,827	J Moloney (Tipperary)
1973	15 July	Cork	5–12	Kerry	1–15	Cork Athletic Grounds	Billy Morgan	9	28,859	J Moloney (Tipperary)
1974	14 July	Cork	1–11	Kerry	0–7	Fitzgerald Stadium	Denis Coughlan	7	49,822	Brendan Cross (Limerick)
1975	13 July	Kerry	1–14	Cork	0–7	Fitzgerald Stadium	Mickey Ned O'Sullivan	10	43,295	Brendan Cross (Limerick)
1976 (R)	11 July; 25 July	Kerry	0–10; 3–20	Cork	0–10; 2–19	Páirc Uí Chaoimh	John O'Keeffe	4	40,600; 45,235	J Moloney (Tipperary)
1977	24 July	Kerry	3–15	Cork	0–9	Fitzgerald Stadium	Ger O'Keeffe	15	46,087	Brendan Cross (Limerick)
1978	16 July	Kerry	3–14	Cork	3–7	Páirc Uí Chaoimh	Denis Moran	7	46,000	Sean O'Connor (Limerick)
1979	22 July	Kerry	2–14	Cork	2–9	Fitzgerald Stadium	Tim Kennelly	5	46,146	Pat Lane (Limerick)
1980	6 July	Kerry	3–13	Cork	0–12	Páirc Uí Chaoimh	Ger Power	10	43,360	Pat Lane (Limerick)
1981	19 July	Kerry	1–11	Cork	0–3	Fitzgerald Stadium	Jimmy Deenihan	11	41,292	Paddy Collins (Westmeath)
1982 (R)	4 July; 2 August	Kerry	0–9; 2–18	Cork	0–9; 0–12	Páirc Uí Chaoimh; Fitzgerald Stadium	John Egan	12	25,320; 34,208	R Moloney (Limerick)
1983	24 July	Cork	3–10	Kerry	3–9	Páirc Uí Chaoimh	Christy Ryan	1	17,000	J Moloney (Tipperary)
1984	1 July	Kerry	3–14	Cork	2–10	Fitzgerald Stadium	Ambrose O'Donovan	7	36,258	J Moloney (Tipperary)
1985	21 July	Kerry	2–11	Cork	0–11	Páirc Uí Chaoimh	Páidí Ó Sé	6	28,524	J Moloney (Tipperary)
1986	6 July	Kerry	0–12	Cork	0–8	FitzGerald Stadium	Tommy Doyle	4	33,198	R Moloney (Limerick)
1987 (R)	26 July; 2 August	Cork	1–10; 0–13	Kerry	2–7; 1–5	Páirc Uí Chaoimh; Fitzgerald Stadium	Conor Counihan	5	49,358	P. Lane (Limerick)
1988	3 July	Cork	1–14	Kerry	0–16	Páirc Uí Chaoimh	Tony Nation	1	41,234	P. Lane (Limerick)
1989	23 July	Cork	1–12	Kerry	1–9	Fitzgerald Stadium	Dinny Allen	3	47,011	P Russell (Tipperary)
1990	1 July	Cork	2–23	Kerry	1–11	Páirc Uí Chaoimh	Larry Tompkins	15	40,065	P. Lane (Limerick)
1991	21 July	Kerry	0–23	Limerick	3–12	Fitzgerald Stadium	Jack O'Shea	2	25,900	P Russell (Tipperary)
1992	19 July	Clare	2–10	Kerry	0–12	Gaelic Grounds	Francis McInerney	4	24,015	P Russell (Tipperary)
1993	18 July	Cork	1–16	Tipperary	1–8	Semple Stadium	Mick McCarthy	8	22,140	T Sugrue (Kerry)
1994	24 July	Cork	2–19	Tipperary	3–9	Páirc Uí Chaoimh	Steven O'Brien	7	13,118	W O'Mahony (Limerick)
1995	23 July	Cork	0–15	Kerry	1–9	Fitzgerald Stadium	Niall Cahalane	3	42,735	P Russell (Tipperary)
1996	21 July	Kerry	0–14	Cork	0–11	Páirc Uí Chaoimh	Billy O'Shea	3		K Walsh (Clare)
1997	20 July	Kerry	1–13	Clare	0–11	Gaelic Grounds	Mike Hassett	5		N Barrett (Cork)
1998	2 August	Kerry	0–17	Tipperary	1–10	Semple Stadium	Séamus Moynihan	4	27,263	N Barrett (Cork)
1999	18 July	Cork	2–10	Kerry	2–4	Páirc Uí Chaoimh	Philip Clifford	6	42,755	Pat McEnaney (Monaghan)
2000	16 July	Kerry	3–15	Clare	0–8	Gaelic Grounds	Séamus Moynihan	16	23,176	J Bannon (Longford)
2001	15 July	Kerry	0–19	Cork	1–13	Páirc Uí Chaoimh	Séamus Moynihan	3	41,158	B O'Gorman (Armagh)
2002 (R)	14 July; 21 July	Cork	2–11; 1–23	Tipperary	1–14; 0–7	Semple Stadium; Páirc Uí Chaoimh	Colin Corkery	19	33,254; 17,708	G Kinneavey (Roscommon); M Monaghan (Kildare)
2003	13 July	Kerry	1–11	Limerick	0–9	Fitzgerald Stadium	Mike McCarthy	5		Brian Crowe (Cavan)
2004 (R)	11 July; 18 July	Kerry	1–10; 3–10	Limerick	1–10; 2–9	Gaelic Grounds; Fitzgerald Stadium	Dara Ó Cinnéide	4	23,214; 29,379	E Kinneavy (Roscommon); M Curley (Galway)
2005	10 July	Kerry	1–11	Cork	0–11	Páirc Uí Chaoimh	Declan O'Sullivan	3	32,000	David Coldrick (Meath)
2006 (R)	9 July; 16 July	Cork	0–10; 1–12	Kerry	0–10; 0–9	Fitzgerald Stadium; Páirc Uí Chaoimh	Derek Kavanagh	6	26,220; 23,693	J. McQuillan (Cavan); Syl Doyle (Wexford)
2007	1 July	Kerry	1–15	Cork	1–13	Fitzgerald Stadium	Declan O'Sullivan	2	31,420	Marty Duffy (Sligo)
2008	6 July	Cork	1–16	Kerry	1–11	Páirc Uí Chaoimh	Graham Canty	5	22,784	Derek Fahy (Longford)
2009	5 July	Cork	2–6	Limerick	0–11	Páirc Uí Chaoimh	Graham Canty	1	20,676	Rory Hickey (Clare)
2010	4 July	Kerry	1–17	Limerick	1–14	Fitzgerald Stadium	Bryan Sheehan	3	23,864	Patrick Fox (Westmeath)
2011	3 July	Kerry	1–15	Cork	1–12	Fitzgerald Stadium	Colm Cooper	3	40,892	David Coldrick (Meath)
2012	8 July	Cork	3–16	Clare	0–13	Gaelic Grounds	Graham Canty	12	9,139	Eddie Kinsella (Laois)
2013	7 July	Kerry	1–16	Cork	0–17	Fitzgerald Stadium	Colm Cooper	2	36,370	Marty Duffy (Sligo)
2014	6 July	Kerry	0–24	Cork	0–12	Páirc Uí Chaoimh	Fionn Fitzgerald; Kieran O'Leary	12	21,028	C Reilly (Meath)
2015 (R)	5 July; 18 July	Kerry	2–15; 1–11	Cork	3–12; 1–6	Fitzgerald Stadium	Kieran Donaghy	5	35,651; 32,233	Pádraig Hughes (Armagh); Maurice Deegan (Laois)
2016	3 July	Kerry	3–17	Tipperary	2–10	Fitzgerald Stadium	Bryan Sheehan	10	21,512	David Gough (Meath)
2017	2 July	Kerry	1–23	Cork	0–15	Fitzgerald Stadium	Fionn Fitzgerald; Johnny Buckley	11	31,836	Paddy Neilan (Roscommon)
2018	23 June	Kerry	3–18	Cork	2–4	Páirc Uí Chaoimh	Shane Murphy	17	27,764	Ciarán Branagan (Down)
2019	22 June	Kerry	1–19	Cork	3–10	Páirc Uí Chaoimh	Gavin White	3	18,265	Anthony Nolan (Wicklow)
2020	22 November	Tipperary	0–17	Cork	0–14	Páirc Uí Chaoimh	Conor Sweeney	3	0*	Maurice Deegan (Laois)
2021	25 July	Kerry	4–22	Cork	1–9	Fitzgerald Stadium	Paul Murphy	22	2,500*	Barry Cassidy (Derry)
2022	28 May	Kerry	1–28	Limerick	0–8	Fitzgerald Stadium	Seán O'Shea	23	14,587	Martin McNally (Monaghan)
2023	7 May	Kerry	5–14	Clare	0–15	Gaelic Grounds	David Clifford	14	12,499	Jerome Henry (Mayo)
2024	5 May	Kerry	0–23	Clare	1–13	Cusack Park	Paudie Clifford	7	12,059	Fergal Kelly (Longford)
2025	4 May	Kerry	4–20	Clare	0–21	Fitzgerald Stadium	Gavin White	11	13,181	Noel Mooney (Cavan)
2026	10 May	Kerry	1–23	Cork	1–15	Fitzgerald Stadium		8		
^{*}Denotes match in which COVID-19 restrictions limited attendance

== Team records and statistics ==
=== Roll of honour ===
==== Legend ====
- Golden background – Munster SFC winner or runner-up also won the All-Ireland SFC that year.

==== Performance by team ====
County team	Title(s)	Runner-up	Winning years	Losing years
Kerry	87	24	1892, 1903, 1904, 1905, 1908, 1909, 1910, 1912, 1913, 1914, 1915, 1919, 1923, 1924, 1925, 1926, 1927, 1929, 1930, 1931, 1932, 1933, 1934, 1936, 1937, 1938, 1939, 1940, 1941, 1942, 1944, 1946, 1947, 1948, 1950, 1951, 1953, 1954, 1955, 1958, 1959, 1960, 1961, 1962, 1963, 1964, 1965, 1968, 1969, 1970, 1972, 1975, 1976, 1977, 1978, 1979, 1980, 1981, 1982, 1984, 1985, 1986, 1991, 1996, 1997, 1998, 2000, 2001, 2003, 2004, 2005, 2007, 2010, 2011, 2013, 2014, 2015, 2016, 2017, 2018, 2019, 2021, 2022, 2023, 2024, 2025 2026	1890, 1893, 1900, 1902, 1906, 1918, 1920, 1945, 1952, 1956, 1966, 1967, 1971, 1973, 1974, 1983, 1987, 1988, 1989, 1990, 1992, 1999, 2006, 2008
Cork	37	54	1890, 1891, 1893, 1894, 1897, 1899, 1901, 1906, 1907, 1911, 1916, 1928, 1943, 1945, 1949, 1952, 1956, 1957, 1966, 1967, 1971, 1973, 1974, 1983, 1987, 1988, 1989, 1990, 1993, 1994, 1995, 1999, 2002, 2006, 2008, 2009, 2012	1889, 1892, 1898, 1903, 1909, 1910, 1913, 1914, 1917, 1935, 1938, 1942, 1947, 1948, 1950, 1951, 1953, 1954, 1955, 1958, 1959, 1961, 1962, 1963, 1964, 1968, 1969, 1970, 1972, 1975, 1976, 1977, 1978, 1979, 1980, 1981, 1982, 1984, 1985, 1986, 1996, 2000, 2001, 2005, 2007, 2011, 2013, 2014, 2015, 2017, 2018, 2019, 2020, 2021, 2026
Tipperary	10	18	1888, 1889, 1895, 1900, 1902, 1918, 1920, 1922, 1935, 2020	1894, 1899, 1907, 1923, 1926, 1928, 1930, 1931, 1932, 1933, 1939, 1943, 1944, 1993, 1994, 1998, 2002, 2016
Clare	2	15	1917, 1992	1912, 1915, 1916, 1919, 1925, 1929, 1936, 1937, 1941, 1949, 1997, 2012, 2023, 2024, 2025
Limerick	1	13	1896	1888, 1895, 1901, 1905, 1922, 1934, 1965, 1991, 2003, 2004, 2009, 2010, 2022
Waterford	1	9	1898	1891, 1896, 1904, 1908, 1911, 1940, 1946, 1957, 1960

=== Team progress: 2001–2019 ===
Below is a record of each county's performance following the introduction of the qualifier system to the All-Ireland series in 2001. Before 2001 only the Munster SFC title winner contested the All-Ireland SFC. Qualifiers did not occur from 2020–2021 due to the impact of the COVID-19 pandemic on Gaelic games. They are no longer held, with weaker teams instead playing in the Tailteann Cup.

Key

Winner
Final
Semi-final
Quarter-final / Super 8s
Qualifier Rounds 1–4 / Tommy Murphy Cup

Championship	2001	2002	2003	2004	2005	2006	2007	2008	2009	2010	2011	2012	2013	2014	2015	2016	2017	2018	2019
Clare	Q2	Q2	Q2	Q2	Q3	Q2	TM	TM	Q2	Q1	Q1	Q4	Q2	Q3	Q2	QF	Q3	Q3	Q4
Cork	Q4	SF	Q1	Q3	SF	SF	F	SF	F	W	QF	SF	QF	QF	Q4	Q4	Q4	Q4	S8s
Kerry	SF	F	SF	W	F	W	W	F	W	QF	F	QF	SF	W	F	SF	SF	S8s	F
Limerick	Q2	Q3	Q4	Q4	Q3	Q2	Q1	Q2	Q4	Q4	QF	Q3	Q1	Q3	Q1	Q2	Q1	Q1	Q2
Tipperary	Q1	Q4	Q3	Q1	Q1	Q2	TM	Q1	Q2	Q2	Q1	Q4	Q1	Q4	Q3	SF	Q3	Q2	Q1
Waterford	Q1	Q1	Q1	Q2	Q1	Q1	TM	TM	Q1	Q2	Q3	Q1	Q2	Q1	Q1	Q1	Q1	Q2	Q1

=== Team results ===
Legend

- 1st – Winner
- 2nd – Finalist
- SF/QF – Semi-finalist / Quarter-finalist

Team	2013	2014	2015	2016	2017	2018	2019	2020	2021	2022	2023	2024	2025	Years
Clare	SF	SF	SF	SF	SF	SF	SF	QF	QF	QF	2nd	2nd	2nd	13
Cork	2nd	2nd	2nd	SF	2nd	2nd	2nd	2nd	2nd	SF	QF	SF	SF	13
Kerry	1st	1st	1st	1st	1st	1st	1st	SF	1st	1st	1st	1st	1st	13
Limerick	QF	QF	QF	QF	QF	QF	SF	SF	SF	2nd	SF	QF	QF	13
Tipperary	QF	SF	SF	2nd	SF	SF	QF	1st	SF	SF	SF	QF	SF	13
Waterford	SF	QF	QF	QF	QF	QF	QF	QF	QF	QF	QF	SF	QF	13

=== By semi-final appearances (2013–present) ===
Team	No.	Years
Kerry	14	2013, 2014, 2015, 2016, 2017, 2018, 2019, 2020, 2021, 2022, 2023, 2024, 2025, 2026
Cork	13	2013, 2014, 2015, 2016, 2017, 2018, 2019, 2020, 2021, 2022, 2024, 2025, 2026
Tipperary	11	2014, 2015, 2016, 2017, 2018, 2020, 2021, 2022, 2023, 2025, 2026
Clare	11	2013, 2014, 2015, 2016, 2017, 2018, 2019, 2023, 2024, 2025, 2026
Limerick	5	2019, 2020, 2021, 2022, 2023
Waterford	2	2013, 2024

=== Most recent championship meetings ===
	Cla	Cor	Ker	Lim	Tip	Wat
Clare	—N/a	2023	2025	2023	2025	2024
Cork		—N/a	2025	2025	2020	2017
Kerry			—N/a	2022	2023	2013
Limerick				—N/a	2022	2021
Tipperary					—N/a	2025
Waterford						—N/a

=== Most recent championship wins ===
	Cla	Cor	Ker	Lim	Tip	Wat
Clare	—N/a	2023		2023	2025	2024
Cork	2018	—N/a	2020	2025	2018	2017
Kerry	2025	2025	—N/a	2022	2023	2013
Limerick	2009			—N/a	2022	2021
Tipperary	2020	2020		2020	—N/a	2025
Waterford	2010	1960	1957	1981	2024	—N/a

=== Consecutive titles ===
==== Octuple ====
- Kerry (1958, 1959, 1960, 1961, 1962, 1963, 1964, 1965)
- Kerry (1975, 1976, 1977, 1978, 1979, 1980, 1981, 1982)

==== Septuple ====
- Kerry (1936, 1937, 1938, 1939, 1940, 1941, 1942)
- Kerry (2013, 2014, 2015, 2016, 2017, 2018, 2019)

==== Sextuple ====
- Kerry (1929, 1930, 1931, 1932, 1933, 1934)
- Kerry (2021, 2022, 2023, 2024, 2025, 2026)

==== Quintuple ====
- Kerry (1923, 1924, 1925, 1926, 1927)

==== Quadruple ====
- Kerry (1912, 1913, 1914, 1915)
- Cork (1987, 1988, 1989, 1990)

==== Treble ====
- Kerry (1903, 1904, 1905)
- Kerry (1908, 1909, 1910)
- Kerry (1946, 1947, 1948)
- Kerry (1953, 1954, 1955)
- Kerry (1968, 1969, 1970)
- Kerry (1984, 1985, 1986)
- Cork (1993, 1994, 1995)
- Kerry (1996, 1997, 1998)
- Kerry (2003, 2004, 2005)

==== Double ====
- Tipperary (1888, 1889)
- Cork (1890, 1891)
- Cork (1893, 1894)
- Cork (1906, 1907)
- Kerry (1950, 1951)
- Cork (1956, 1957)
- Cork (1966, 1967)
- Cork (1973, 1974)
- Kerry (2000, 2001)
- Cork (2008, 2009)
- Kerry (2010, 2011)

=== Titles by decade ===
The most successful team of each decade, judged by number of Munster SFC titles, is as follows:

- 1880s: 2 for Tipperary (1888–89)
- 1890s: 6 for Cork (1890-91-93-94-97-99)
- 1900s: 5 for Kerry (1903-04-05-08-09)
- 1910s: 6 for Kerry (1910-12-13-14-15-19)
- 1920s: 6 for Kerry (1923-24-25-26-27-29)
- 1930s: 9 for Kerry (1930-31-32-33-34-36-37-38-39)
- 1940s: 7 for Kerry (1940-41-42-44-46-47-48)
- 1950s: 7 for Kerry (1950-51-53-54-55-58-59)
- 1960s: 8 for Kerry (1960-61-62-63-64-65-68-69)
- 1970s: 7 for Kerry (1970-72-75-76-77-78-79)
- 1980s: 6 for Kerry (1980-81-82-84-85-86)
- 1990s: 5 for Cork (1990-93-94-95-99)
- 2000s: 6 for Kerry (2000-01-03-04-05-07)
- 2010s: 9 for Kerry (2010-11-13-14-15-16-17-18-19)
- 2020s: 6 for Kerry (2021-22-23-24-25-26)

=== Finishing positions ===
- Most championships
  - 87, Kerry (1892, 1903, 1904, 1905, 1908, 1909, 1910, 1912, 1913, 1914, 1915, 1919, 1923, 1924, 1925, 1926, 1927, 1929, 1930, 1931, 1932, 1933, 1934, 1936, 1937, 1938, 1939, 1940, 1941, 1942, 1944, 1946, 1947, 1948, 1950, 1951, 1953, 1954, 1955, 1958, 1959, 1960, 1961, 1962, 1963, 1964, 1965, 1968, 1969, 1970, 1972, 1975, 1976, 1977, 1978, 1979, 1980, 1981, 1982, 1984, 1985, 1986, 1991, 1996, 1997, 1998, 2000, 2001, 2003, 2004, 2005, 2007, 2010, 2011, 2013, 2014, 2015, 2016, 2017, 2018, 2019, 2021, 2022, 2023, 2024, 2025, 2026)
- Most second-place finishes
  - 55, Cork (1889, 1892, 1898, 1903, 1909, 1910, 1913, 1914, 1917, 1935, 1938, 1942, 1947, 1948, 1950, 1951, 1953, 1954, 1955, 1958, 1959, 1961, 1962, 1963, 1964, 1968, 1969, 1970, 1972, 1975, 1976, 1977, 1978, 1979, 1980, 1981, 1982, 1984, 1985, 1986, 1996, 2000, 2001, 2005, 2007, 2011, 2013, 2014, 2015, 2017, 2018, 2019, 2020, 2021, 2026)
- Most semi-final finishes
  - Tipperary
- Most quarter-final finishes
  - Waterford

=== Team debuts ===
Year	Debutants	Total
1888	Clare, Cork, Limerick, Tipperary, Waterford	5
1889	Kerry	1
1890–	None	0
Total		6

=== Other records ===
==== Gaps ====
- Longest gaps between successive Munster SFC titles:
  - 85 years: Tipperary (1935–2020)
  - 75 years: Clare (1917–1992)
  - 16 years: Tipperary (1902–1918)
  - 15 years: Cork (1928–1943)
  - 13 years: Tipperary (1922–1935)
  - 12 years: Cork (1916–1928)
  - 11 years: Kerry (1892–1903)
- Longest gaps between successive Munster SFC finals:
  - 49 years: Tipperary (1944–1993)
  - 43 years: Clare (1949–1992)
  - 31 years: Limerick (1934–1965)
  - 29 years: Waterford (1911–1940)
  - 26 years: Limerick (1965–1991)
  - 17 years: Limerick (1905–1922)
  - 15 years: Clare (1997–2012)
  - 14 years: Tipperary (2002–2016)
  - 12 years: Limerick (1922–1934)
  - 12 years: Limerick (1991–2003)
  - 12 years: Limerick (2010–2022)
  - 11 years: Tipperary (1907–1918)
  - 11 years: Cork (1917–1928)
  - 11 years: Waterford (1946–1957)
  - 11 years: Clare (2012–2023)

==== Active gaps ====
- Longest active gaps since a Munster SFC title:
  - 130 years: Limerick (1896–)
  - 128 years: Waterford (1898–)
  - 34 years: Clare (1992–)
  - 14 years: Cork (2012–)
  - 6 years: Tipperary (2020–)
- Longest active gaps since Munster SFC final appearance:
  - 66 years: Waterford (1960–)
  - 6 years: Tipperary (2020–)
  - 4 years: Limerick (2022–)
  - 1 year: Clare (2025–)

==== Longest undefeated run ====
- The record for the longest unbeaten run stands at 18 games, and is held by Kerry. They achieved this feat on three separate occasions: 1936–1943, 1958–1966 and 1975–1983.

==== Munster SFC final pairings ====
Pairing	Meeting	First meeting	Last meeting
Cork v Kerry	69	1890	2026
Clare v Kerry	16	1912	2025
Kerry v Tipperary	14	1918	2016
Cork v Tipperary	11	1889	2020
Kerry v Limerick	8	1905	2022
Kerry v Waterford	5	1904	1960
Cork v Waterford	4	1891	1957
Clare v Cork	4	1916	2012
Limerick v Tipperary	3	1888	1922
Cork v Limerick	3	1897	2009
Limerick v Waterford	1	1896	

=== All-time table (2020–present) ===
Legend

Colours
Currently competing in the All-Ireland Senior Football Championship
Currently competing in the Tailteann Cup

As of 17 May 2026 (after 2026 Munster SFC).

#	Team	Pld	W	D	L	Points
1	Kerry	14	13	0	1	26
2	Tipperary	13	7	0	6	14
3	Cork	13	6	0	7	12
4	Clare	11	4	0	7	8
=	Limerick	11	4	0	7	8
6	Waterford	8	1	0	7	2

== Player records ==
=== Most appearances ===
Rank	Player	Team	Games	Era
1	Colm Cooper	Kerry	41	2002–2016
1	Tomás Ó Sé	Kerry	41	1997–2013
3	Darragh Ó Sé	Kerry	40	1994–2009
4	Marc Ó Sé	Kerry	38	2002–2016
5	Dan O'Keeffe	Kerry	36	1932–1948
6	Tom O'Sullivan	Kerry	34	2000–2011
6	Séamus Moynihan	Kerry	34	1992–2006
6	Jack O'Shea	Kerry	34	1977–1992
6	Mick O'Connell	Kerry	34	1956–1974
10	Maurice Fitzgerald	Kerry	33	1988–2001
10	Billy Morgan	Cork	33	1966–1981

=== Record Munster SFC medal winners ===
Rank	Player	Team	No.	Years
1	Dan O'Keeffe	Kerry	14	1932, 1933, 1934, 1936, 1937, 1938, 1939, 1940, 1941, 1942, 1944, 1946, 1947, 1948
2	Mick O'Connell	Kerry	12	1958, 1959, 1960, 1961, 1962, 1963, 1964, 1965, 1968, 1969, 1970, 1972
3	Pat Spillane	Kerry	12	1975, 1976, 1977, 1978, 1979, 1980, 1981, 1982, 1984, 1985, 1986, 1991
4	Mick O'Dwyer	Kerry	11	1958, 1959, 1960, 1961, 1962, 1963, 1965, 1968, 1969, 1970, 1972
5	John O'Keeffe	Kerry	11	1970, 1972, 1975, 1976, 1977, 1978, 1979, 1980, 1981, 1982, 1984
6	Páidí Ó Sé	Kerry	11	1975, 1976, 1977, 1978, 1979, 1980, 1981, 1982, 1984, 1985, 1986
7	Ger Power	Kerry	11	1975, 1976, 1977, 1978, 1979, 1980, 1981, 1982, 1984, 1985, 1986
8	Mikey Sheehy	Kerry	11	1975, 1976, 1977, 1978, 1979, 1980, 1981, 1982, 1984, 1985, 1986
9	Denis "Ógie" Moran	Kerry	11	1975, 1976, 1977, 1978, 1979, 1980, 1981, 1982, 1984, 1985, 1986
10	Dick Fitzgerald	Kerry	10	1903, 1905, 1908, 1909, 1910, 1912, 1913, 1914, 1915, 1923
11	Miko Doyle	Kerry	10	1929, 1930, 1931, 1932, 1933, 1934, 1936, 1937, 1938, 1939
12	Joe Keohane	Kerry	10	1936, 1937, 1938, 1939, 1940, 1941, 1942, 1944, 1947, 1948
13	Johnny Culloty	Kerry	10	1955, 1959, 1960, 1961, 1962, 1963, 1964, 1965, 1969, 1970
14	Jack O'Shea	Kerry	10	1977, 1978, 1979, 1980, 1981, 1982, 1984, 1985, 1986, 1991

=== Top scorers ===
==== All time ====
Rank	Player	Team	Score	Tally	Era
1	Maurice Fitzgerald	Kerry	9–167	194	1988–2001
2	Mikey Sheehy	Kerry	15–119	164	1974–1987
3	Colin Corkery	Cork	4–132	144	1993–2004
4	Colm Cooper	Kerry	8–110	134	2002–2016
5	Declan Browne	Tipperary	5–106	121	1996–2007
6	Pat Spillane	Kerry	14–77	119	1975–1991
7	Bryan Sheehan	Kerry	5–97	112	2005–2017
8	Peter Lambert	Tipperary	11–68	101	1988–2003
9	Dara Ó Cinnéide	Kerry	8–71	95	1994–2005
10	Mick O'Dwyer	Kerry	4–79	91	1957–1973
10	Dinny Allen	Cork	11–58	91	1972–1989

==== By year ====
Year	Name	Team	Score	Total
1965	Éamonn Cregan	Limerick	2-8	14
1966	Gene McCarthy	Cork	3-6	15
1967	Mick Tynan	Limerick	3–12	21
1968	Mick O'Dwyer	Kerry	0–12	12
1969	Vinny Kirwan	Waterford	0–12	12
1969	John Cummins	Tipperary	0–12	12
1970	Denis Coughlan	Cork	3–14	23
1971	Denis Coughlan	Cork	1–16	19
1972	Mick O'Dwyer	Kerry	0–13	13
1973	Billy Field	Cork	2–14	20
1974	Ray Cummins	Cork	1-8	11
1975	Jim Kehoe	Tipperary	4-0	12
1976	Mikey Sheehy	Kerry	1–20	23
1977	Barry Walsh	Kerry	2-9	15
1978	Mikey Sheehy	Kerry	4–13	25
1979	Ger Power	Kerry	4-6	18
1980	Anthony Moran	Limerick	0–21	21
1981	Mikey Sheehy	Kerry	1–11	14
1982	Mikey Sheehy	Kerry	2–15	21
1983	Mikey Sheehy	Kerry	2–11	17
1983	John Cleary	Cork	1–14	17
1984	Franny Kelly	Tipperary	1-9	12
1985	Franny Kelly	Tipperary	1–19	22
1986	Franny Kelly	Tipperary	1–11	14
1987	Larry Tompkins	Cork	0–15	15
1988	Maurice Fitzgerald	Kerry	0–16	16
1989	Eoin Sheehan	Limerick	4-7	19
1990	Maurice Fitzgerald	Kerry	1–14	17
1991	Maurice Fitzgerald	Kerry	0–24	24
1992	Maurice Fitzgerald	Kerry	1–20	23
1993	Colin Corkery	Cork	2–20	26
1994	Peter Lambert	Tipperary	4–13	25
1996	Maurice Fitzgerald	Kerry	4–20	32
1996	Dara Ó Cinnéide	Kerry	1–15	18
1997	Brendan Cummins	Tipperary	1–13	16
1998	Declan Browne	Tipperary	2–29	35
1099	Podsie O'Mahony	Cork	1–13	16
2000	Dara Ó Cinnéide	Kerry	2-9	15
2001	Dara Ó Cinnéide	Kerry	1–13	16
2002	Colin Corkery	Cork	0–29	29
2003	Declan Browne	Tipperary	1–16	19
2004	Muiris Gavin	Limerick	0–24	24
2005	Colm Cooper	Cork	3–12	21
2006	James Masters	Cork	1–21	24
2007	James Masters	Cork	3–18	27
2008	Daniel Goulding	Cork	1-8	11
2009	Donncha O'Connor	Cork	3–14	23
2010	Colm Cooper	Kerry	1–20	23
2011	Daniel Goulding	Cork	2–15	21
2012	Ian Ryan	Limerick	1–17	20
2013	Daniel Goulding	Cork	1–17	20
2014	Paul Whyte	Waterford	1-7	10
2014	David Tubridy	Clare	1-7	10
2014	Shane McGrath	Clare	1-07	10
2014	James O'Donoghue	Kerry	0–10	10
2015	Colm O'Neill	Cork	1–14	17
2016	Kevin O'Halloran	Tipperary	0–15	15
2017	James O'Donoghue	Kerry	0–16	16
2018	Paul Geaney	Kerry	2–12	18
2019	Mark Collins	Cork	0–17	17
2020	Conor Sweeney	Tipperary	1–18	21
2021	Sean O'Shea	Kerry	2–21	27
2022	Sean O'Shea	Kerry	0–16	16
2023	Eoin Cleary	Clare	0-14	14
2023	David Clifford	Kerry	2-08	14
2024	Sean O'Shea	Kerry	0–15	15
2025	David Clifford	Kerry	2–14	20

=== Captains ===
==== Each team's most recent winning captain ====
- Clare: Francis McInerney (1992)
- Cork: Graham Canty (2012)
- Kerry: Gavin White (2025)
- Limerick: Con Fitzgerald (1896)
- Tipperary: Conor Sweeney (2020)
- Waterford: James Wall (1898)

==== Winning captains ====
Captain	County team	As captain / joint captain	
Captain	County team	Titles	Years won
Dick Fitzgerald	Kerry	4	1912, 1913, 1914, 1915
Graham Canty	Cork	3	2008, 2009, 2012
Séamus Moynihan	Kerry	3	1998, 2000, 2001
Niall Sheehy	Kerry	3	1961, 1963, 1964
Miko Doyle	Kerry	3	1932, 1933, 1937
Ned O'Shea	Tipperary	3	1918, 1920, 1922
Gavin White	Kerry	2	2018, 2025
Fionn Fitzgerald	Kerry	2	2014, 2017
Bryan Sheehan	Kerry	2	2010, 2016
Colm Cooper	Kerry	2	2011, 2013
Declan O'Sullivan	Kerry	2	2005, 2007
Denis Coughlan	Cork	2	1967, 1974
Paudie Sheehy	Kerry	2	1953, 1960
John Dowling	Kerry	2	1954, 1955
Tadhg Crowley	Cork	2	1943, 1945
Tom O'Connor	Kerry	2	1939, 1942
Dan O'Keeffe	Kerry	2	1934, 1936
John Joe Sheehy	Kerry	2	1926, 1930
Joe Barrett	Kerry	2	1927, 1929
Tom Costello	Kerry	2	1909, 1910
Gil Kavanagh	Tipperary	2	1888, 1889

==== Captains Gallery ====
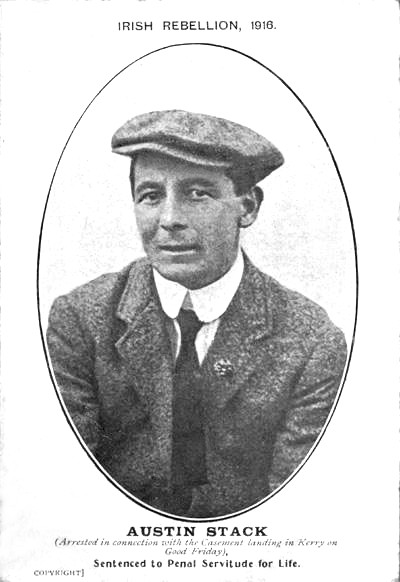
Austin Stack captained Kerry in 1904.

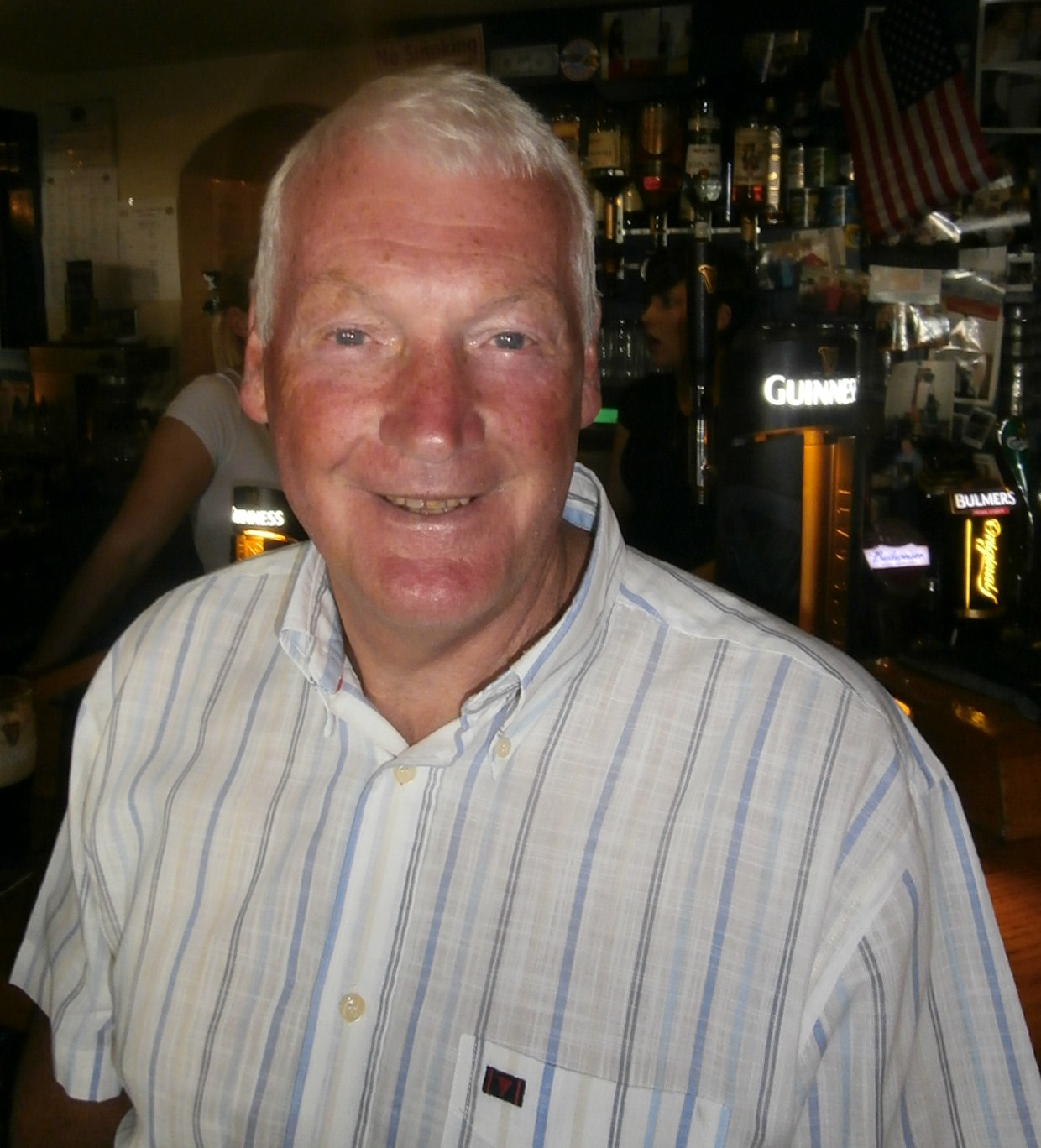
Billy Morgan captained Cork in 1973.

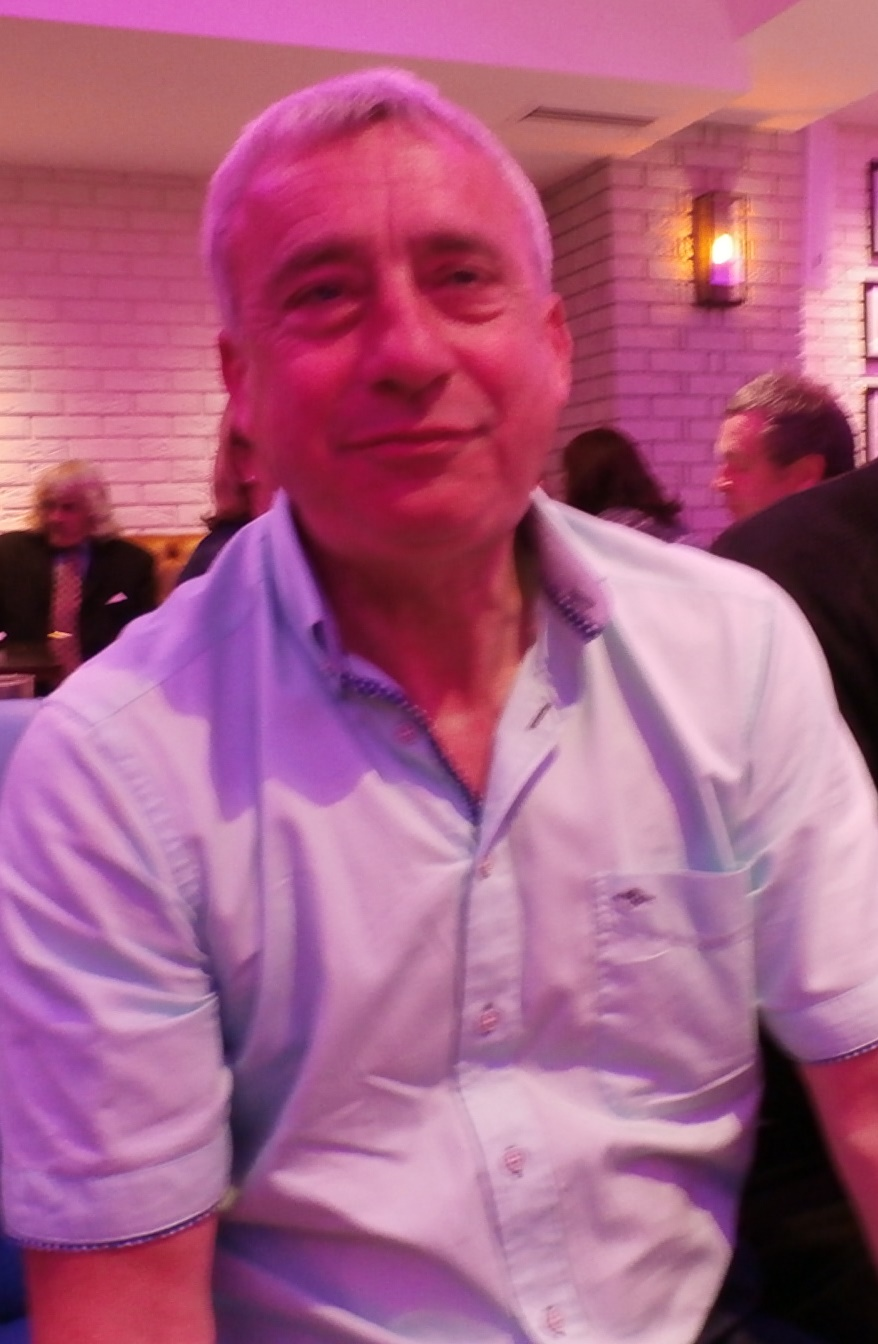
Denis "Ógie" Moran captained Kerry in 1978.

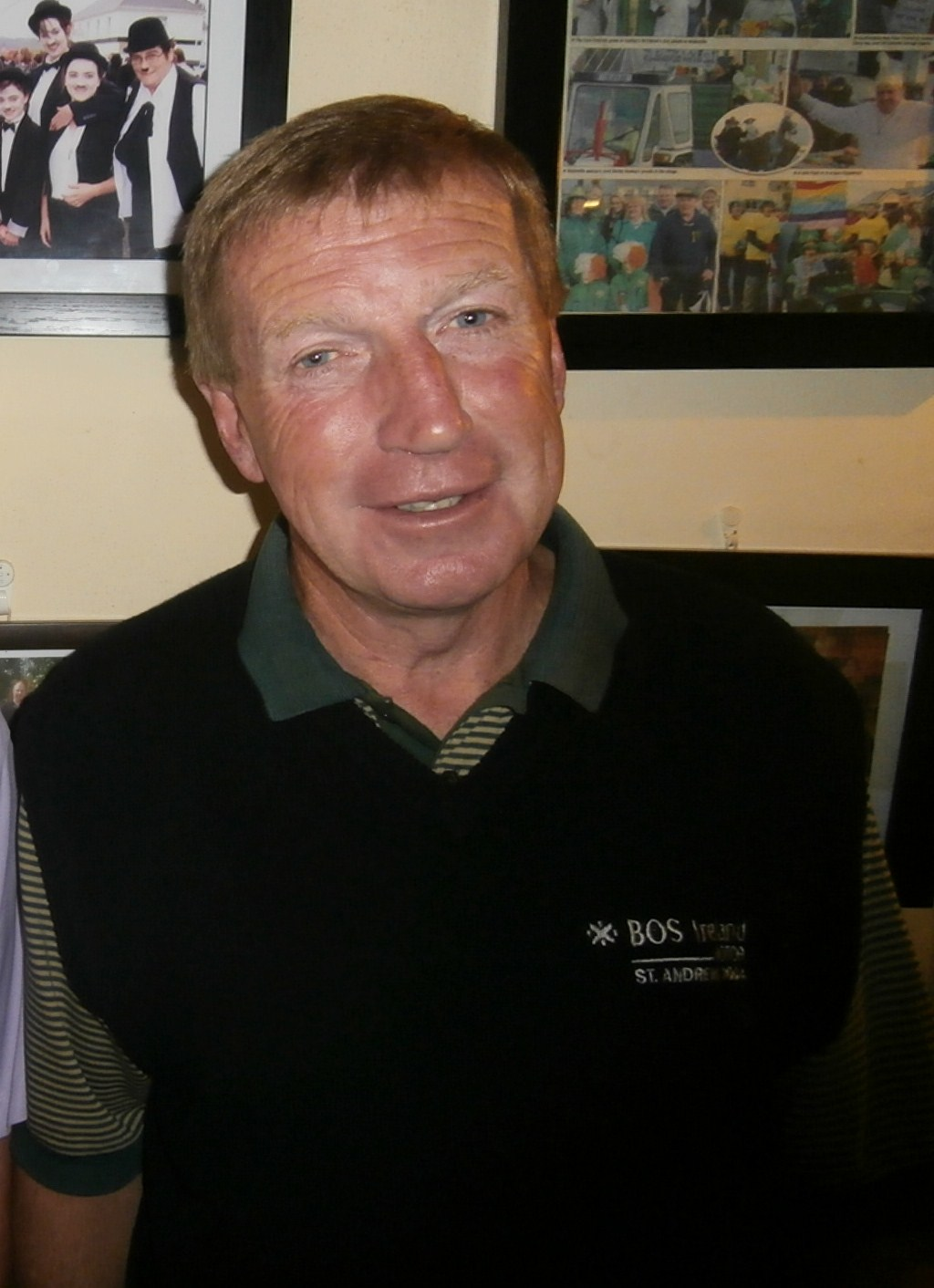
Dinny Allen captained Cork in 1989.

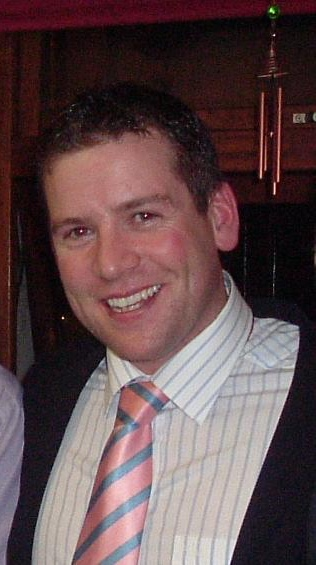
Dara Ó Cinnéide captained Kerry in 2004.

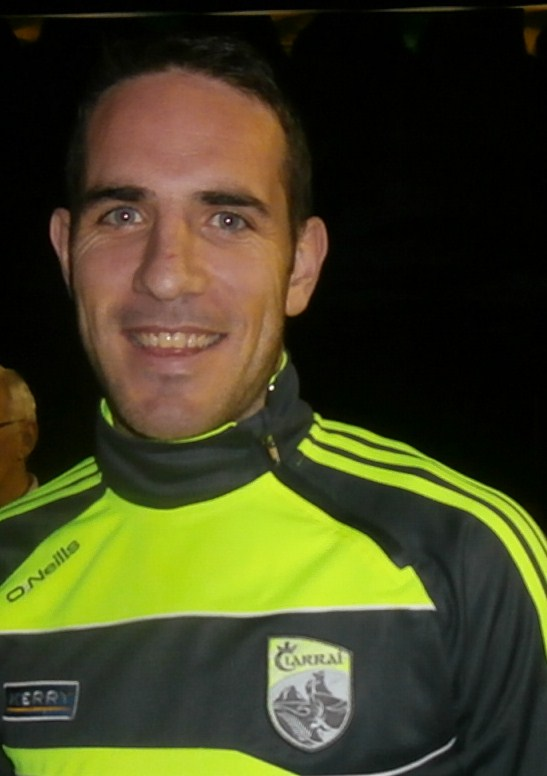
Declan O'Sullivan captained Kerry in 2005 and 2007.

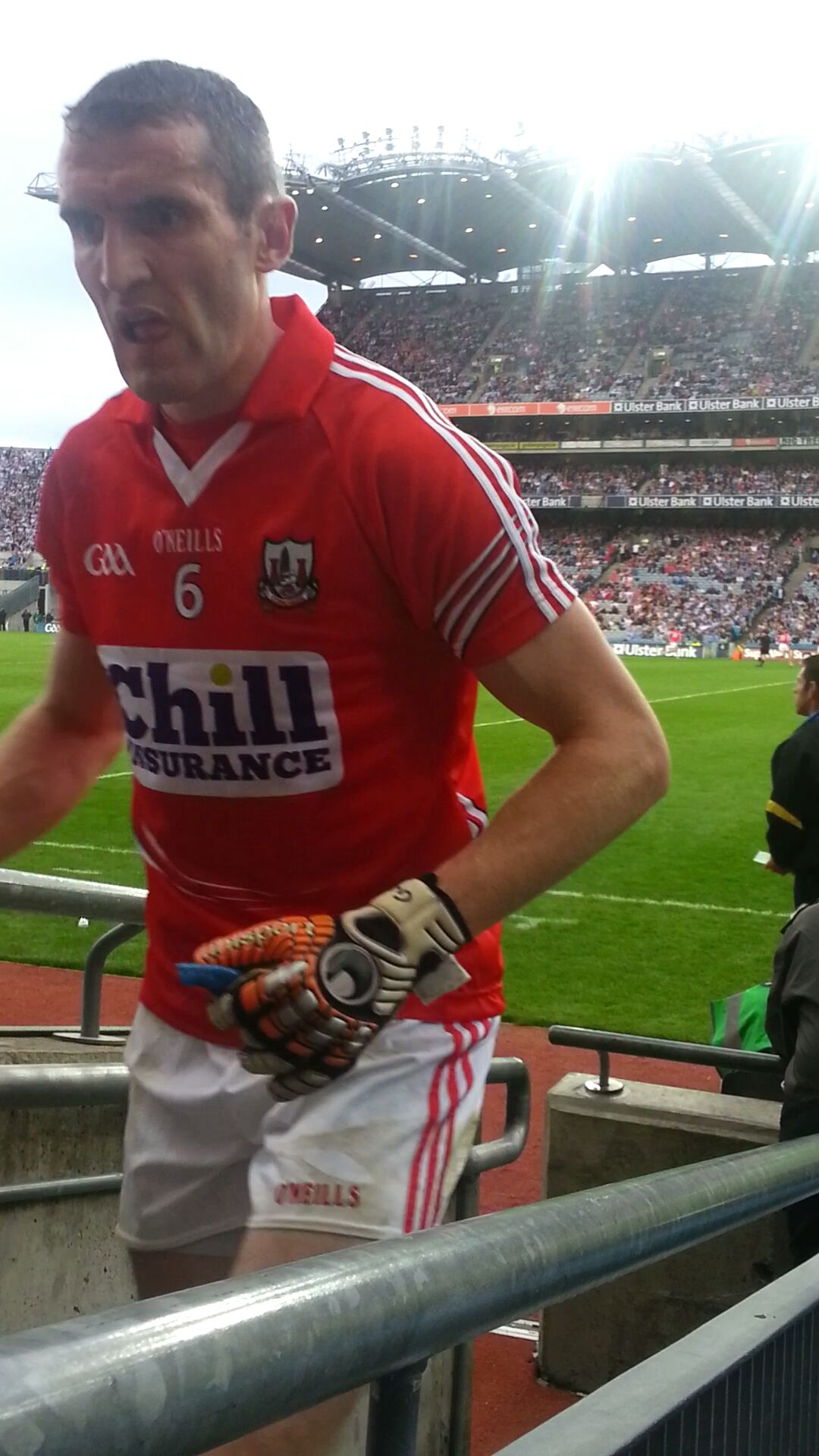
Graham Canty captained Cork in 2008 and 2009.

== Managers ==
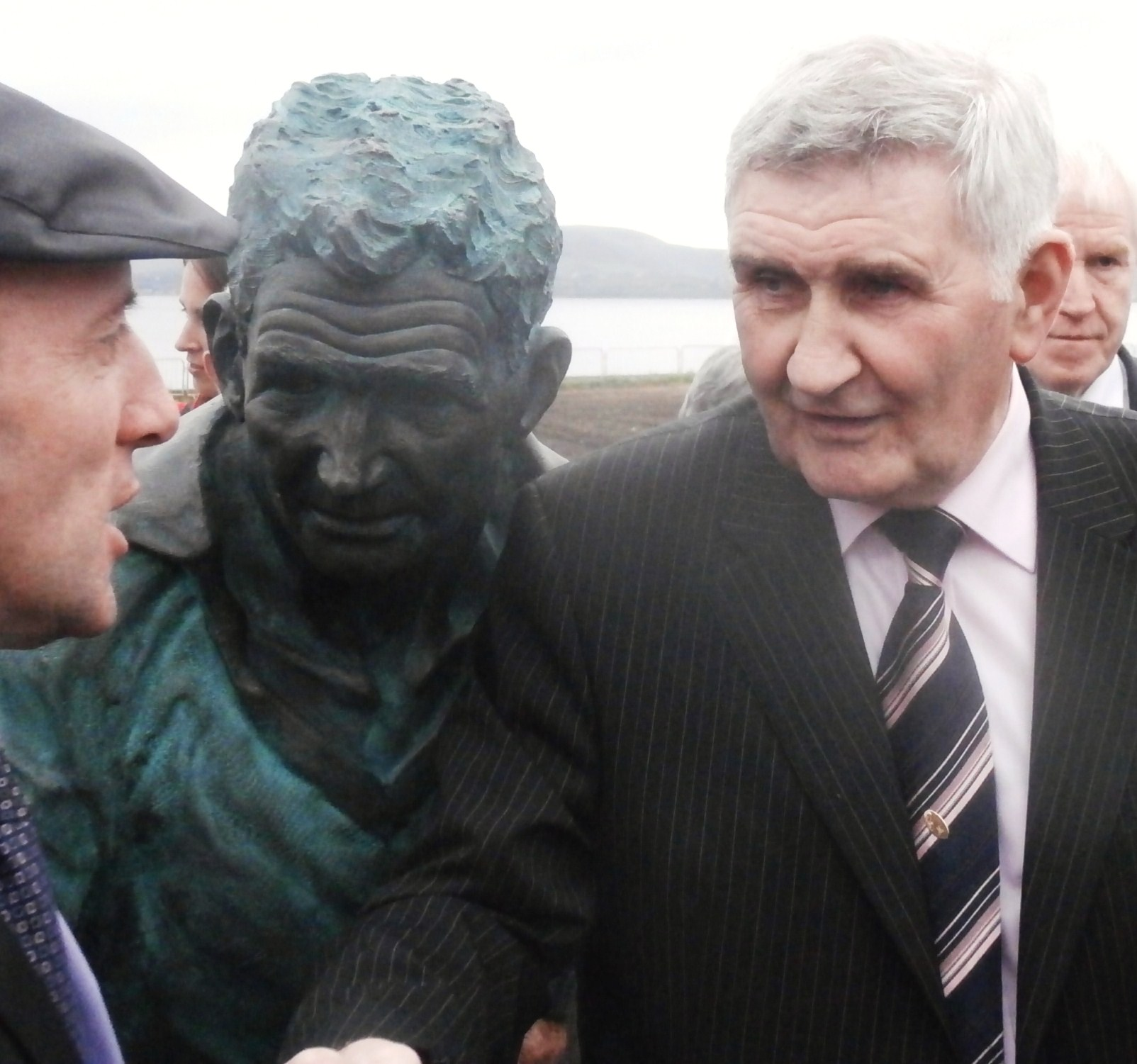
Mick O'Dwyer (right) won more titles that any other manager. Behind his left ear is Jimmy Deenihan, the former Kerry player.

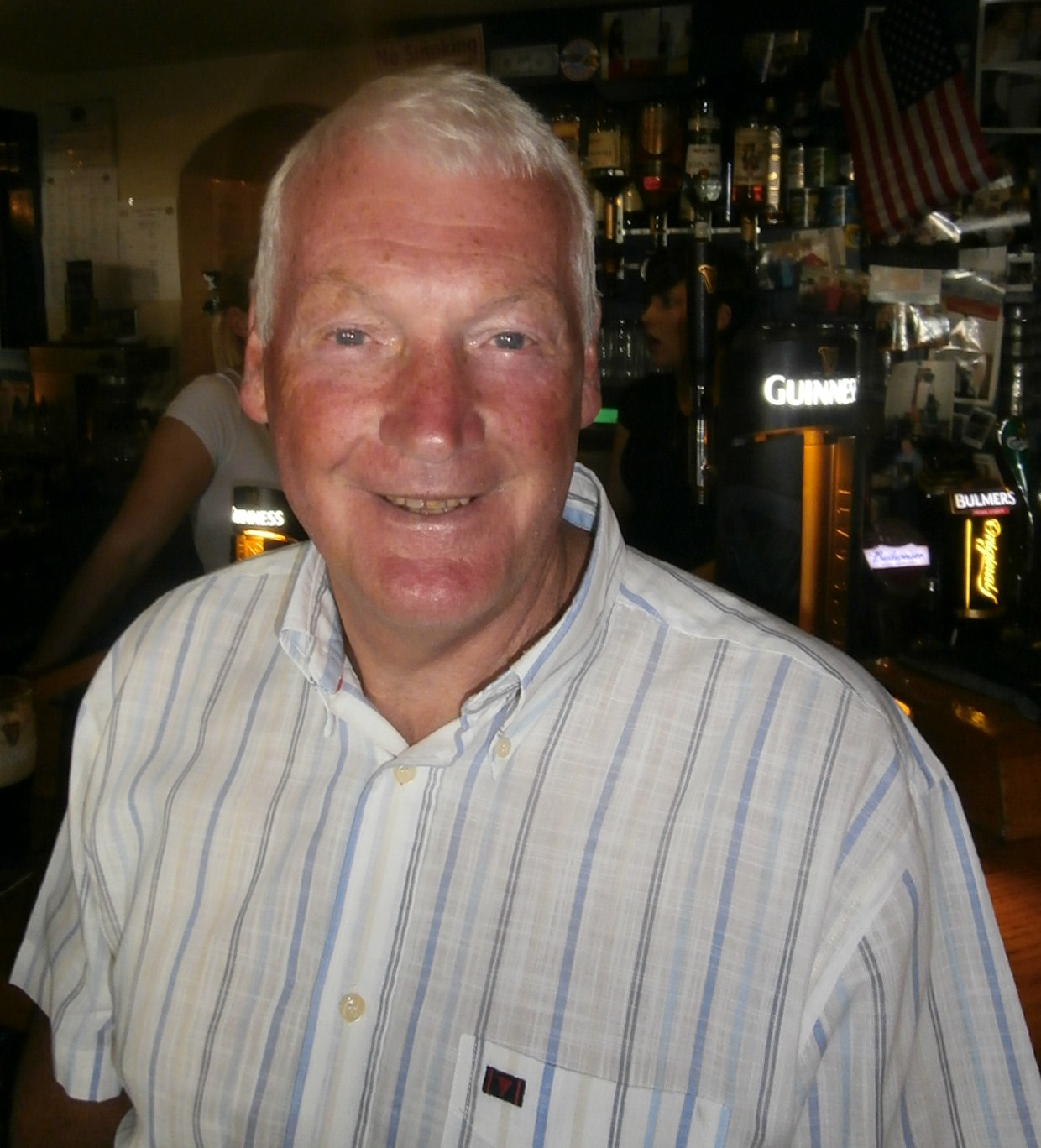
Billy Morgan managed Cork to 8 titles across three separate decades.

Managers in the Munster SFC are involved in the day-to-day running of the team, including the training, team selection, and sourcing of players from the club championships. Their influence varies from county-to-county and is related to the individual county boards. From 2018, all inter-county head coaches must be Award 2 qualified. The manager is assisted by a team of two or three selectors and an extensive backroom team consisting of various coaches. Prior to the development of the concept of a manager in the 1970s, teams were usually managed by a team of selectors with one member acting as chairman.

=== Winning managers (1968–present) ===
Manager	Team	Wins	Winning years
Mick O'Dwyer	Kerry	11	1975, 1976, 1977, 1978, 1979, 1980, 1981, 1982, 1984, 1985, 1986
Billy Morgan	Cork	8	1987, 1988, 1989, 1990, 1993, 1994, 1995, 2006
Jack O'Connor	Kerry	8	2004, 2005, 2010, 2011, 2022, 2023, 2024, 2025
Páidí Ó Sé	Kerry	6	1996, 1997, 1998, 2000, 2001, 2003
Éamonn Fitzmaurice	Kerry	6	2013, 2014, 2015, 2016, 2017, 2018
Jackie Lyne	Kerry	3	1968, 1969, 1970
Donie O'Donovan	Cork	3	1971, 1973, 1974
Conor Counihan	Cork	3	2008, 2009, 2012
Larry Tompkins	Cork	2	1999, 2002
Peter Keane	Kerry	2	2019, 2021
Johnny Culloty	Kerry	1	1972
Éamonn Ryan	Cork	1	1983
Mickey Ned O'Sullivan	Kerry	1	1991
John Maughan	Clare	1	1992
Pat O'Shea	Kerry	1	2007
David Power	Tipperary	1	2020

=== Current managers ===
Manager	County	Appointed	Time as manager
Peter Keane	Clare	28 October 2024	1 year, 306 days
Philly Ryan	Tipperary	27 August 2024	2 years, 3 days
Jack O'Connor	Kerry	4 October 2021	4 years, 330 days
Vacant	Waterford		
John Cleary	Cork	13 April 2022	4 years, 139 days
Jimmy Lee	Limerick	11 September 2024	1 year, 353 days

== Media coverage ==
- RTÉ broadcasts highlights of the Munster SFC. They are shown through a dedicated highlights programme called The Sunday Game. The first edition of the programme was in 1979.
- Since 2017, Sky Sports and RTÉ have shared live coverage of championship matches.

== Sponsorship ==
Since 1994, the Munster SFC has been sponsored. The sponsor has usually been able to determine the championship's sponsorship name.

Period	Sponsor(s)	Name
1888–1993	No main sponsor	The Munster Championship
1994–2007	(Republic of Ireland) Bank of Ireland	The Bank of Ireland Munster Championship
2008–2009	(Japan) Toyota, Ulster Bank, (Republic of Ireland) Vodafone	The Munster GAA Football Championship
2010	(Republic of Ireland) SuperValu, Ulster Bank, (Republic of Ireland) Vodafone	The Munster GAA Football Championship
2011–2013	(Republic of Ireland) SuperValu, Ulster Bank, (Republic of Ireland) Eircom	The Munster GAA Football Championship
2014	(Republic of Ireland) SuperValu, (Republic of Ireland) GAAGO, (Republic of Ireland) Eircom	The Munster GAA Football Championship
2015	(Republic of Ireland) SuperValu, (Republic of Ireland) AIB, (Republic of Ireland) Eircom	The Munster GAA Football Championship
2016–present	(Republic of Ireland) SuperValu, (Republic of Ireland) AIB, (Republic of Ireland) Eir	The Munster GAA Football Championship

== Venues ==
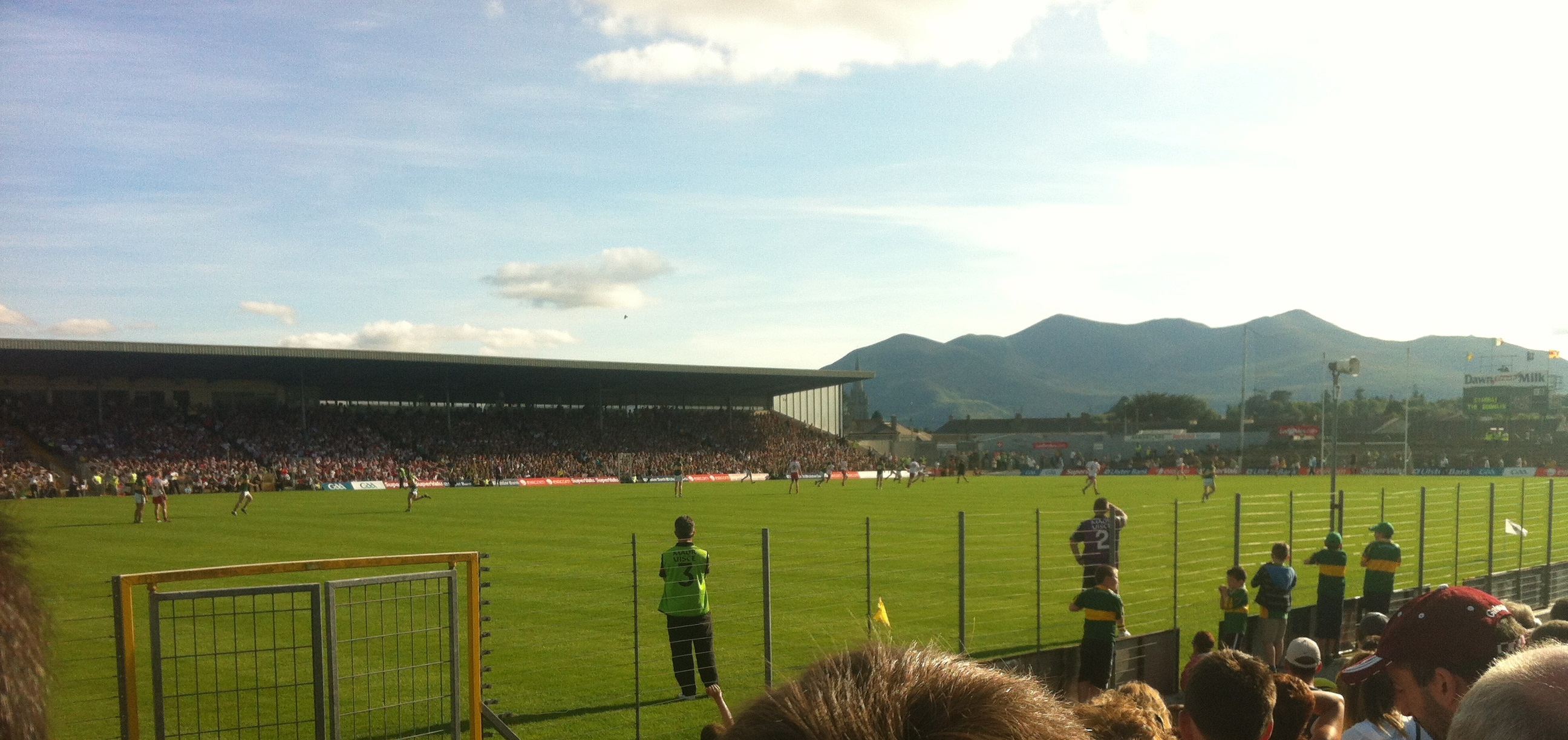
FitzGerald Stadium is the home venue of Kerry and is one of the most popular Munster final venues

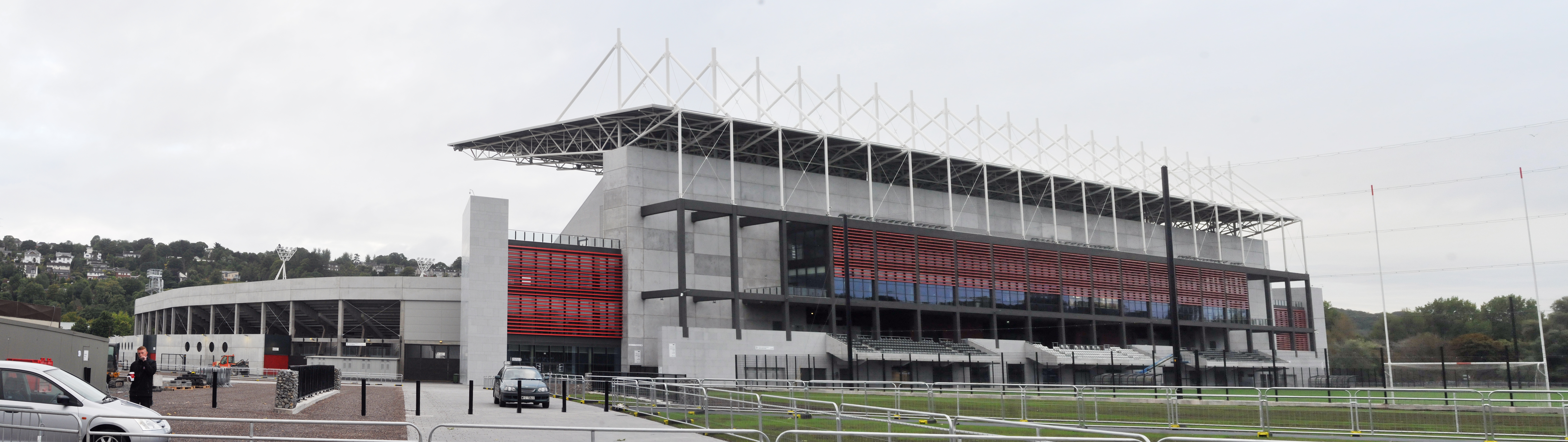
As well as being the home venue of Cork, the newly rebuilt Páirc Uí Chaoimh hosted the 2018 and 2019 finals

=== History ===
Munster SFC matches were traditionally played at neutral venues or at a location that was deemed to be halfway between the two participants; however, all of the teams eventually came to home and away agreements. Every second meeting between these teams is played at the home venue of one of them.

While the six county grounds have regularly been used for championship matches in recent times, smaller club grounds have historically been used for games which may not have had such a high-profile. These grounds include: Ned Hall Park in Clonmel, FitzGerald Park in Kilmallock, Páirc na nGael in Askeaton, Páirc Mac Gearailt in Fermoy, Hennessy Memorial Park in Milltown Malbay and Frank Sheehy Park in Listowel.

=== Attendances ===
Stadium attendances are a significant source of regular income for the Munster Council and for the teams involved. For the 2019 championship, average attendances were 6,146 with a total aggregate attendance figure of 30,731. Excluding the final, these figures revealed a drop of 49% recorded from those through the turnstiles the previous year.

=== Stadia and locations ===
County team	Location	Province	Stadium	Capacity
Clare	Ennis	Munster	Cusack Park	19,000
Cork	Cork	Munster	Páirc Uí Chaoimh	45,000
Kerry	Killarney	Munster	Fitzgerald Stadium	38,000
Limerick	Limerick	Munster	Gaelic Grounds	44,023
Tipperary	Thurles	Munster	Semple Stadium	45,690
Waterford	Waterford	Munster	Fraher Field	15,000

== See also ==
- Munster Senior Club Football Championship
- Munster Senior Hurling Championship
- All-Ireland Senior Football Championship
  - Connacht Senior Football Championship
  - Leinster Senior Football Championship
  - Ulster Senior Football Championship
