= Billy Lee (Gaelic footballer) =

Limerick Gaelic footballer and manager

Billy Lee is a former Gaelic footballer and former manager of the Limerick county football team. He is from Newcastle West.

== Player ==
Lee played for Limerick. He became a selector when Liam Kearns managed the team between 1999 and 2005, and then was manager for six years. He won the McGrath Cup and won the National Football League Division 4 title. He got them promoted to Division Two where he left them with a place in the Sam Maguire Cup. He went out on a high when he led Limerick to a Munster Final in 2022. He beat Clare on penalties then sent off Tipperary at Semple Stadium, only for Kerry to send them into a last-12 outing with Cork, which they lost. They were ranked 31st of 32 in 2018 and Lee was going to forfeit that year's championship. In his last year with Limerick, Lee was one of the longest serving inter-county managers on the circuit. He was part of the selection committee for a new manager and then the others asked him to do the job. He left his post in August 2022.

Preceded by John Brudair	Limerick Senior Football Manager; 2016–2022	Vacant
