= 2012 Munster Senior Football Championship =

The 2012 Munster Senior Football Championship was that year's installment of the annual Munster Senior Football Championship held under the auspices of the Munster GAA. It was won by Cork who defeated Clare in the final. It was Cork's 37th title. This was Clare's first appearance in the final since 2000.

The winning Cork team received the Munster Championship Cup, and automatically advanced to the quarter-final stage of the 2012 All-Ireland Senior Football Championship. Clare entered the All-Ireland Qualifiers but lost their next game, to Kerry. Cork were eliminated by eventual All-Ireland winners Donegal.

== Bracket ==
Quarter-finals
Limerick	2-12
Waterford	0-7
Tipperary	0-10
Kerry	0-16

Semi-finals
Limerick	0-15
Clare	1-13
Cork	0-17
Kerry	0-12

Final
Clare	0-13
Cork	3-16

== Quarter-finals ==
20 May 2012
3:30pm
Quarter Final

Limerick	2-12 - 0-7	Waterford
I Ryan 1-7 (6f), S O'Carroll 1-1, G Collins 0-2, J Cooke, I Corbett 0-1 each.	Report	T Grey, M Ferncombe, JJ Hutchinson 0-2 each, S Ahearne 0-1.

Gaelic Grounds, Limerick
Attendance: 2,431
Referee: C Lane (Cork)
27 May 2012
2:00pm
Quarter Final

Tipperary	0-10 - 0-16	Kerry
A Maloney 0-4 (3f), P Acheson 0-2, M Quinlivan 0-2 (2f), H Coghlan, P Austin 0-1 each.	Report	B Sheehan 0-6 (5f), C Cooper 0-4 (2f), T O Se, A Maher, Darran O'Sullivan, Declan O'Sullivan, K O'Leary, J O'Donoghue 0-1 each.

Semple Stadium, Thurles
Attendance: 4,000 (approx)
Referee: M Duffy (Sligo)

== Semi-finals ==
9 June 2012
7:00pm
Semi Final

Clare	1-13 - 0-15	Limerick
D Tubridy 0-5 (1 '45', 1f), R Donnelly 0-3, G Kelly 1-0, S McGrath 0-2, G Brennan 0-1, A Clohessy 0-1, G Quinlan 0-1	Report	I Ryan 0-10 (5f), G Collins 0-2, S O'Carroll 0-1, S Kelly 0-1, E O'Connor 0-1

Gaelic Grounds, Limerick
Attendance: 4,446
Referee: D Fahy (Longford)
10 June 2012
2:00pm
Semi Final

Cork	0-17 - 0-12	Kerry
D O'Connor 0-6 (2f), C O'Neill 0-5 (3f), P Kerrigan, D Goulding 0-2 each, C Sheehan, P Kissane 0-1 each	Report	C Cooper 0-5 (3f), Declan O'Sullivan, J O'Donoghue 0-2 each, P Galvin, E Brosnan, Darran O'Sullivan 0-1 each

Páirc Uí Chaoimh, Cork
Attendance: 23,184
Referee: D Coldrick (Meath)

== Final ==
8 July 2012
2:00pm
Final

Cork	3-16 - 0-13	Clare
A Walsh 1-1, C Sheehan, C O'Neill 0-4 each, N Murphy, F Goold 1-0 each, D O'Connor, D Goulding, P Kerrigan all 0-2 each, B O'Driscoll 0-1.	Report; Report 2	M O'Shea 0-4, R Donnelly, D Tubridy (2f) 0-3 each, G Brennan 0-2, Gordan Kelly 0-1.

Gaelic Grounds, Limerick
Attendance: 9,139
Referee: E Kinsella (Laois).
