= Colm Collins =

Gaelic football manager

Sport
Club management
- Years: Club
- Clare

Colm Collins is a Gaelic football manager, associated with Cratloe GAA club.

== Career ==
Collins is a native of Kilmihil. He began managing Clare in late 2013 and became the longest-serving inter-county football manager when Mickey Harte left Tyrone.

Collins led Clare from Division 4 to Division 3 of the National Football League, then to Division 2 where he consolidated his team's position. He led Clare to the 2016 All-Ireland Senior Football Championship qauerter-finals. He stayed on as Clare's manager for 2018. At the end of that year he became the fourth longest-serving manager after Mickey Harte, Jim Gavin and Malachy O'Rourke. At the end of 2019, the third longest, he announced then that he would take time to consider his future after Clare's championship exit. He led Clare to the 2022 All-Ireland Senior Football Championship quarter-finals, when they had the beating of Roscommon.

With his appointment for a tenth season at the end of 2022, Collins became the longest serving inter-county manager in either code (since Brian Cody had earlier resigned as Kilkenny hurling manager).

Collins stepped down as Clare manager when his team exited the championship in June 2023, leaving Armagh manager Kieran McGeeney as the longest serving manager in inter-county football.

== Personal life ==
His son, Podge, is a footballer and hurler. Podge concentrated on the football for 2015. He concentrated on the football for 2021, from '14 up until '16, he did the two teams but only hurling in '17.

Sporting positions
Preceded by Mick O'Dwyer	Clare Senior Football Manager; 2013–2023	Succeeded by Mark Fitzgerald
