= 1898 All-Ireland Senior Football Championship =

Men's Gaelic football inter-county competition

All-Ireland Champions
- Winning team: Dublin (5th win)
- Captain: Matt Rea

All-Ireland Finalists
- Losing team: Waterford

Provincial Champions
- Munster: Waterford
- Leinster: Dublin
- Ulster: Not played
- Connacht: Not played

Championship statistics

The 1898 All-Ireland Senior Football Championship was the 12th staging of Ireland's premier Gaelic football knock-out competition. Dublin were the winners.

== Results ==
=== Leinster ===
1898
Round 1

Meath	2–6 – 0–6	Offaly

Jones's Road, Dublin

11 July 1898
Round 2

Wexford	2–24 – 0–5	Carlow

1898
Round 3

Louth	1–7 – 0–3	Meath

19 March 1899
Round 4

Offaly	2–6 – 1–3	Wicklow

Jones's Road, Dublin
Referee: Charles Brady

19 November 1899
Quarter-Final

Offaly	0–4 – 1–11	Wexford

Jones's Road, Dublin

1898
Quarter-Final

Dublin	2–6 – 0–6	Laois

Jones's Road, Dublin

1900
Semi-Final

Dublin	1–16 – 0–1	Kilkenny

Jones's Road, Dublin

1900
Semi-Final

Wexford	3–10 – 0–3	Wicklow

Jones's Road, Dublin

4 February 1900
Final

Dublin	2–6 – 0–0 Unfinished	Wexford

Jones's Road, Dublin

Dublin were awarded the game.

=== Munster ===
10 September 1899
Quarter-Final

Limerick	scr. – scr.	Clare

Tipperary

1899
Semi-Final

Waterford	0–9 – 0–0	Tipperary

Waterford

24 September 1899
Final

Waterford	1–3 – 0–4	Cork

Lismore

=== Final ===
8 April 1900

Dublin	2–8 – 0–4	Waterford

Tipperary
Attendance: 1,000
Referee: J McCarthy (Kilkenny)

== Statistics ==
- Waterford won an only ever Munster SFC final.
- Waterford were represented by Erin's Hope, with a few representatives from Lismore Blackwater Ramblers.
- Limerick and Clare were thrown out because they refused to play their tie at Tipperary.
- It was Dublin's second two-in-a-row as All-Ireland champions.
