= 1896 All-Ireland Senior Football Championship =

Football championship

All-Ireland Champions
- Winning team: Limerick (2nd win)
- Captain: Con Fitzgerald

All-Ireland Finalists
- Losing team: Dublin

Provincial Champions
- Munster: Limerick
- Leinster: Dublin
- Ulster: Not played
- Connacht: Not played

Championship statistics

The 1896 All-Ireland Senior Football Championship was the tenth staging of Ireland's premier Gaelic football knock-out competition. It was the first championship in which a goal was worth three points. Limerick won their second, and so far last, title. In the Munster final they beat Tipperary, the defending champions.

== Results ==
=== Leinster ===
1896
Quarter-Final

| Dublin | 0–12 – 1–3 | Wicklow |

Jones's Road, Dublin

29 November 1896
Quarter-Final

| Louth | 1–6 – 0–2 | Offaly |

Jones's Road, Dublin

6 December 1896
Quarter-Final

| Kildare | 0–6 – 02 | Wexford |

Jones's Road, Dublin

30 May 1897
Semi-Final

| Kildare | 1–12 – 2–13 | Dublin |

Jones's Road, Dublin

1897
Semi-Final

| Kilkenny | 0–4 – 1–10 | Meath |

Jones's Road, Dublin

24 October 1897
Final

| Dublin | 2–4 – 1–5 Unfinished | Meath |

Jones's Road, Dublin

The final was abandoned after 50 minutes of play. It was refixed on several occasions but never replayed. On 2 January 1898 Dublin were awarded the Leinster title.

=== Munster ===
14 March 1897
Quarter-final

| Limerick | 1–2 – 1–1 | Cork |

Tipperary

3 November 1897
Semi-final

| Limerick | 2–4 – 0–6 | Tipperary |

Mallow
Referee: D.Power

21 November 1897
Final

| Limerick | 0–4 – 0–1 | Waterford |

Mallow

=== Final ===
6 January 1898

| Limerick | 1–5 – 0–7 | Dublin |

Jones's Road, Dublin
Attendance: 3,500
Referee: Thomas Dooley (Cork)

== Statistics ==
- Limerick win a Munster SFC title and a second All-Ireland SFC title.
