= 2020 Munster Senior Football Championship final =

- Event: 2020 Munster Senior Championship
Tipperary	Cork
0–17	0–14
- Date: 22 November 2020
- Venue: Páirc Uí Chaoimh, Cork
- Man of the Match: Conor Sweeney
- Referee: Maurice Deegan (Laois)
- Attendance: 0 (Note: The game was played behind closed doors due to the impact of the COVID-19 pandemic on Gaelic games.)
- Weather: Dry

The 2020 Munster Senior Football Championship final was played at Páirc Uí Chaoimh in Cork on 22 November 2020. It was contested by Tipperary and Cork. Tipperary won a first title since 1935, doing so in the home ground of their opponent. This was also the first time since 1992 that neither Cork nor Kerry won the competition.

== Pre-match ==
The game was held amid the COVID-19 pandemic in the Republic of Ireland, which also led to the delayed championship.

To mark the centenary of Bloody Sunday, Tipperary wore special commemorative jerseys in white and green for the game, a replica of the colours worn by the Tipperary team which played Dublin at Croke Park in 1920.

Former under-21 footballer of the year and professional Australian rules footballer Colin O'Riordan was named in the team.

== Match details ==
22 November 2020

Tipperary	0–17 – 0–14	Cork
C Sweeney 7 (2fs, 2m); M Quinlivan 5 (1f); L Casey 2 (f); K Fahey 1, E Comerford 1 (free), P Austin 1.	Report	L Connolly 4 (2fs, 1 45), M Collins 4 (4fs); J O'Rourke 2; C O'Callaghan 1, B Hurley 1, S White 1, C O'Mahony 1 (f).

Páirc Uí Chaoimh, Cork
Referee: Maurice Deegan (Laois)

Tipperary	Cork

1	Evan Comerford
2	Colm O'Shaughnessy
3	Alan Campbell
4	Jimmy Feehan
5	Bill Maher
6	Kevin Fahey
7	Robbie Kiely
8	Steven O'Brien
9	Liam Casey
10	Brian Fox
11	Michael Quinlivan
19	Colin O'Riordan
13	Colman Kennedy
14	Conor Sweeney (c)
15	Conal Kennedy
Substitutes:
26	Liam Boland for Colman Kennedy (51 mins)
21	Paudie Feehan for K. Fahey (54 mins)
12	Emmett Moloney for B. Fox (61 mins)
20	Pádraic Looram for R. Kiely (63 mins)
23	Philip Austin for L. Casey (71 mins)
Manager:
David Power

1	M. A. Martin
2	M. Shanley
3	P. Ring
4	K. O'Donovan
5	T. Corkery
6	S. Meehan
7	M. Taylor
8	I. Maguire (c)
9	K. O'Hanlon
10	R. Deane
11	C. O'Callaghan
12	J. O'Rourke
13	L. Connolly
14	B. Hurley
15	M. Collins
Substitutes:
?	C. O'Mahony for L. Connolly
?	S. Ryan for P. Ring
?	S. White for C O'Callaghan
?	M. Keane for K. O'Hanlon
?	M. Hurley for M. Taylor
Manager:
Ronan McCarthy

Man of the Match:
Conor Sweeney

== Post-match ==
The result meant Tipperary qualified for a repeat of the 2016 All-Ireland Senior Football Championship semi-final against Mayo. Mayo won, to qualify for the 2020 All-Ireland Senior Football Championship final.

Tipp captain Conor Sweeney laid a wreath at the Bloody Sunday memorial at Croke Park on Hill 16 after the game against Mayo.
