= 2016 Tipperary county football team season =

Tipperary county football team
2016 season
| Manager | Liam Kearns |
| Captain | Peter Acheson |
| All-Ireland SFC | Semi-finalist |
| Munster SFC | Finalist |
| NFL D3 | 6th |

The 2016 season was Liam Kearns's first year as manager of the senior Tipperary county football team.

Tipperary recorded their first victory over Cork in the Munster Senior Football Championship since 1944 and reached the All-Ireland semi-finals for the first time since 1935.

In November 2015, Liam Kearns had been named as the new manager of the senior Tipperary county football team.

Intersport/Elverys continued as sponsors of Tipperary GAA for the second year. The Tipperary jersey for the 2016 season was the same as was used in 2015 and displayed the Intersport brand name on the front and their co-sponsor Elvery’s name on the back.

On 3 November 2016, Michael Quinlivan won Tipperary's first All-Star award since 2003, being picked in the full-forward position. Evan Comerford, Robbie Kiely, Peter Acheson, and Conor Sweeney were also nominated. Josh Keane and Jimmy Feehan were also nominated for the GAA/GPA Young Footballer of the Year award. Quinlivan became just the second Tipperary footballer to claim an All Star, joining Declan Browne who won the awards in 1998 and 2003.

== Squad ==
| No. | Player | Position | Club |
|---|---|---|---|
| 1 | Evan Comerford | Goalkeeper | Kilsheelan-Kilcash |
| 2 | Colm O'Shaughnessy | Right corner back | Ardfinnan |
| 3 | Alan Campbell | Full back | Moyle Rovers |
| 4 | Ciarán McDonald | Left corner back | Aherlow |
| 5 | Bill Maher | Right half back | Kilsheelan-Kilcash |
| 6 | Robbie Kiely | Centre back | Carbery Rangers |
| 7 | Jimmy Feehan | Left half back | Killenaule |
| 8 | Peter Acheson (c) | Midfield | Moyle Rovers |
| 9 | George Hannigan | Midfield | Shannon Rovers |
| 10 | Josh Keane | Right half Forward | Golden-Kilfeacle |
| 11 | Michael Quinlivan | Centre forward | Clonmel Commercials |
| 12 | Brian Fox | Left half Forward | Éire Óg, Annacarty |
| 13 | Kevin O'Halloran | Right corner forward | Portroe |
| 14 | Conor Sweeney | Full forward | Ballyporeen |
| 15 | Philip Austin | Left corner forward | Borrisokane |

| No. | Player | Position | Club |
|---|---|---|---|
| 16 | Ciarán Kenrick | Substitute | Moyle Rovers |
| 17 | Alan Moloney | Substitute | Rockwell Rovers |
| 18 | Shane Leahy | Substitute | Arravale Rovers |
| 19 | Martin Dunne | Substitute | Moyle Rovers |
| 20 | Billy Hewitt | Substitute | Ardfinnan |
| 21 | Mark Hanley | Substitute | Aherlow |
| 22 | Ian Fahey | Substitute | Clonmel Commercials |
| 23 | Donal Lynch | Substitute | Clonmel Commercials |
| 24 | John O'Callaghan | Substitute | Ballyporeen |
| 25 | Donough Leahy | Substitute | Arravale Rovers |
| 26 | Shane O'Connell | Substitute | Golden-Kilfeacle |

== Management ==
- Manager: Liam Kearns
- Selectors: Shane Stapleton, Tommy Toomey, Paul Fitzgerald

== Competitions ==
=== National Football League ===
Compete in Division 3 final and automatic promotion to Division 2
Automatic relegation to Division 4

| Team | Pld | W | D | L | F | A | Diff | Pts |
|---|---|---|---|---|---|---|---|---|
| Kildare | 7 | 6 | 0 | 1 | 10-92 | 6-73 | 31 | 12 |
| Clare | 7 | 4 | 0 | 3 | 7-95 | 3-81 | 26 | 8 |
| Offaly | 7 | 4 | 0 | 3 | 3-85 | 5-80 | -1 | 8 |
| Longford | 7 | 4 | 0 | 3 | 3-88 | 7-82 | -6 | 8 |
| Sligo | 7 | 3 | 1 | 3 | 8-84 | 10-85 | -7 | 7 |
| Tipperary | 7 | 2 | 3 | 2 | 12-60 | 5-90 | -9 | 7 |
| Westmeath | 7 | 2 | 1 | 4 | 5-76 | 5-75 | 1 | 5 |
| Limerick | 7 | 0 | 1 | 6 | 4-73 | 11-87 | -35 | 1 |

^{1}Clare, Offaly and Longford are ranked by scoring difference.

^{2}Sligo are ranked ahead of Tipperary by scoring difference as the head-to-head between the teams was a draw.

| 31/01/16; Round 1 | Limerick | 1-12 - 2-9 | Tipperary | Gaelic Grounds, Limerick; Referee: B Cawley |
| 31/01/16; Round 1 | I Ryan (0-9), P Nash (1-0), S Buckley (0-2), S Cahill (0-1) | Report | C Sweeney (0-4), P Acheson (1-1), J Keane (1-0), P Austin (0-2), A Maloney (0-1), M Dunne (0-1) | Gaelic Grounds, Limerick; Referee: B Cawley |

| 07/02/16; Round 2 | Tipperary | 2-7 - 1-7 | Clare | Clonmel GAA Ground, Clonmel; Referee: P O'Sullivan |
| 07/02/16; Round 2 | P Austin (0-4), B Fox (1-1), C Sweeney (1-0), J Keane (0-1), P Acheson (0-1) | Report | D Tubridy (0-3), J Malone (1-0), E Cleary (0-2), G Brennan (0-2) | Clonmel GAA Ground, Clonmel; Referee: P O'Sullivan |

| 28/02/16; Round 3 | Westmeath | 0-11 - 1-8 | Tipperary | Cusack Park, Mullingar; Referee: F Barry |
| 28/02/16; Round 3 | J Connellan (0-3), J Heslin (0-3), K Martin (0-3), J Egan (0-1), S Dempsey (0-1) | Report | A Maloney (0-3), R Kiely (1-0), C Sweeney (0-2), B Fox (0-1), M Quinlivan (0-1), S Leahy (0-1) | Cusack Park, Mullingar; Referee: F Barry |

| 06/03/16; Round 4 | Tipperary | 2-11 - 0-12 | Offaly | Sean Treacy Park, Tipperary; Referee: J Molloy |
| 06/03/16; Round 4 | M Quinlivan (1-4), C Sweeney (0-6), M Dunne (1-0), P Austin (0-1) | Report | N Dunne (0-4), N McNamee (0-3), S Doyle (0-3), B Allen (0-1), S Pender (0-1) | Sean Treacy Park, Tipperary; Referee: J Molloy |

| 13/03/16; Round 5 | Longford | 1-17 - 1-11 | Tipperary | Pearse Park, Longford; Referee: S McLaughlin |
| 13/03/16; Round 5 | B Kavanagh (0-8), J McGivney (0-5), L Moran (1-0), B McKeon (0-1), D Gallagher (0-1), L Connerton (0-1), M Hughes (0-1) | Report | C Sweeney (0-6), M Quinlivan (0-4), J Lonergan (1-1) | Pearse Park, Longford; Referee: S McLaughlin |

| 26/03/16; Round 6 | Tipperary | 1-5 - 2-13 | Kildare | Semple Stadium, Thurles; Referee: N Mooney |
| 26/03/16; Round 6 | K Fahey (1-1), A Moloney (0-2), M Quinlivan (0-1), P Austin (0-1) | Report | D Flynn (1-2), A Tyrrell (0-3), E O'Flaherty (0-3), N Kelly (1-0), P Cribbin (0-2), T Moolick (0-2), E Callaghan (0-1) | Semple Stadium, Thurles; Referee: N Mooney |

| 03/04/16; Round 7 | Sligo | 0-18 - 3-9 | Tipperary | Markievicz Park, Sligo; Referee: N McKenna |
| 03/04/16; Round 7 | N Murphy (0-7), A Marren (0-4), K Cawley (0-3), B Egan (0-1), M Breheny (0-1), N Ewing (0-1), N Gaughan (0-1) | Report | A Moloney (1-3), P Acheson (1-1), M Quinlivan (1-0), C Sweeney (0-2), E Comer (0-1), J Lonergan (0-1), K Fahey (0-1) | Markievicz Park, Sligo; Referee: N McKenna |

=== Munster Senior Football Championship ===
Quarter-finals
Clare | 0-16
Limerick | 0-13
Waterford | 1-07
Tipperary | 1-15

Semi-finals
Clare | 0-17
Kerry | 2-23
Cork | 2-16
Tipperary | 3-15

Final
Kerry | 3-17
Tipperary | 2-10

==== Summary ====
In June 2016, Tipperary reached the Munster final after a 3-15 to 2-16 win against Cork. They lost the Munster final to Kerry by 3-17 to 2-10 in a game which was shown live on RTÉ One.

29 May 2016
3:30 p.m.
First round

| Waterford | 1-7 - 1-15 | Tipperary |
|---|---|---|
| P Whyte (1-5, 0-3 frees, 0-1 ’45); G Crotty, T Prendergast (0-1 each). | Report | M Quinlivan (0-4); G Hannigan, P Acheson (0-3 each); M O’Gorman (1-0 OG); K O’Halloran (0-2, 0-2 frees); M Dunne, C O’Shaughnessy, B Fox (0-1 each). |

Fraher Field, Dungarvan
Attendance: 1,753
Referee: D Gough (Meath)
12 June 2016
Semi Final

| Cork | 2-16 - 3-15 | Tipperary |
|---|---|---|
| M Collins 2-1, D O'Connor (3fs), P Kerrigan (1f) 0-3 each, C Dorman, C O'Neill (2fs), D Goulding (1f) 0-2 each, B Hurley, J O'Rourke, P Kelleher 0-1 each. | Report | M Quinlivan 1-3 (0-1f), K O'Halloran 0-7 (3fs, 2 45s), B Fox 1-1, C Sweeney 1-0, P Acheson 0-2, C McDonald, B Maher 0-1 each. |

Semple Stadium, Thurles
Attendance: 2,734
Referee: P Neilan (Roscommon)
- Tipperary's last victory over Cork in the Munster Senior Football Championship was in 1944.
3 July 2016
Final

| Kerry | 3-17 - 2-10 | Tipperary |
|---|---|---|
| Paul Geaney 2-3, Paul Murphy 1-1, Bryan Sheehan (0-4f), James O’Donoghue (0-3f) 0-4 each, Barry John Keane, Mikey Geaney, Killian Young, Darran O’Sullivan, Stephen O’Brien 0-1 each | Report | Kevin O’Halloran 0-6 (0-4f, 0-1 ’45), Jimmy Feehan, Robbie Kiely 1-0 each, Michael Quinlivan 0-3 (0-2f), Alan Moloney 0-1 |

Fitzgerald Stadium, Killarney
Attendance: 21,512

=== All-Ireland Senior Football Championship ===
==== Summary ====
Tipperary went on to defeat Derry by 1-21 to 2-17 in round 4A of the qualifiers to reach the All Ireland Quarter-finals for the first time. On 31 July 2016, Tipperary defeated Galway by 3-13 to 1-10 in the 2016 All-Ireland Quarter-finals at Croke Park as they reached their first All-Ireland semi-final since 1935.

On 21 August 2016, Tipperary were beaten in the semi-final by Mayo on a 2-13 to 0-14 scoreline. In the first half of the match Robbie Kiely received a black card after ten minutes for pulling on the jersey of Jason Doherty which the referee David Coldrick deemed as a cynical foul. Former players including Jim McGuinness and Peter Canavan have said that the black card was a wrong decision by the referee. The Derry game was shown live on Sky Sports with the Galway game shown live on RTÉ One. The Mayo game was shown live on RTÉ One and Sky Sports.

23 July 2016
5.00 PM
Round 4A

| Derry | 2-17 - 1-21 | Tipperary |
|---|---|---|
| M. Lynch (1-4, 0-3 frees); D. Heavron (0-4); N. Loughlin (0-3); E. Brown (1-0); J. Kielt (0-2, 1 free); E. Lynn, E. Bradley, L. McGoldrick, C. Bradley (0-1 each). | Report | K. O’Halloran (1-5, 0-4 frees, 0-1 45); M. Quinlivan (0-6, 4 frees); C. Sweeney (0-5); J. Keane (0-2); P. Austin, P. Acheson, B. Maher (0-1 each). |

Breffni Park, Cavan
Attendance: 2,795
Referee: M. Duffy (Sligo)
31 July
4.00 PM

| Galway | 1-10 - 3-13 | Tipperary |
|---|---|---|
| S Walsh 0-4 (4fs), D Comer 1-0, D Cummins 0-3, E Brannigan 0-1, P Conroy 0-1, P Varley 0-1 | Report | C Sweeney 2-2, M Quinlivan 1-4 (1f), K O'Halloran 0-4 (2fs, 145), B Fox 0-1, R Kiely 0-1, P Acheson 0-1 |

Croke Park, Dublin
Attendance: 29,251
Referee: C Lane (Cork)
21 August
3:30 pm

| Mayo | 2-13 - 0-14 | Tipperary |
|---|---|---|
| A. Moran (0-4); J. Doherty, C. O’Shea (1-0 each); C. O’Connor (0-3, frees); D. O’Connor (0-2); K. McLoughlin, L. Keegan, A. O’Shea, C. Boyle (0-1 each). | Report | M. Quinlivan (0-7, frees); C. Sweeney (0-3, 1 free); K. O’Halloran (0-2, frees); P. Austin, B. Maher (0-1 each). |

Croke Park, Dublin
Attendance: 53,212
Referee: David Coldrick (Meath)

== See also ==
- 2016 Tipperary county hurling team season
