= 2020 Tipperary county football team season =

Tipperary county football team
2020 season
Manager	David Power
Captain	Conor Sweeney
All-Ireland SFC	Semi-finalist
Munster SFC	Winners
NFL D3	5th

The following is a summary of Tipperary county football team's 2020 season. David Power was in his first year as manager. The season was suspended in March 2020 due to the COVID-19 pandemic. The season resumed in mid-October of the same year.

On 22 November 2020, Tipperary won the Munster Senior Football Championship after a 0–17 to 0–14 win against Cork in the final. It was Tipperary's first Munster SFC title in 85 years.

To mark the centenary of Bloody Sunday, Tipperary wore special commemorative jerseys in white and green in the final, a replica of the colours worn by the Tipperary team which played Dublin at Croke Park in 1920.

Tipperary went on to play Mayo in the All-Ireland Semi-final on 6 December. In foggy conditions they lost the game by 5–20 to 3-13 after being behind by 4–12 to 1–5 at half-time.

== Competitions ==
=== National Football League ===
Pos	Team	Pld	W	D	L	PF	PA	PD	Pts	Qualification or relegation
1	Cork (P)	7	7	0	0	132	90	+42	14	NFL Division 3 champions and promotion to 2021 NFL Division 2
2	Down (P)	7	4	1	2	87	87	0	9 (Note: Head-to-head result: Down 0-14 – 0-12 Derry.)	Promotion to 2021 NFL Division 2
3	Derry	7	4	1	2	110	95	+15	9	
4	Longford	7	3	1	3	96	90	+6	7 (Note: Head-to-head result: Longford 3-12 – 3-7 Tipperary.)	
5	Tipperary	7	3	1	3	99	104	−5	7	
6	Offaly	7	2	1	4	102	111	−9	5	
7	Leitrim (R)	7	1	1	5	90	109	−19	3	Relegation to 2021 NFL Division 4
8	Louth (R)	7	1	0	6	105	135	−30	2	Relegation to 2021 NFL Division 4

Updated to match(es) played on 25 October 2020. Source: GAA.ie
Rules for classification: 1) League points 2) Where only two teams are involved, the outcome of the meeting of the two teams in the competition 3) Scoring Difference 4) Highest Total Score For 5) A Play-Off.
(P) Promoted; (R) Relegated
Notes:

26 January 2020 1	Tipperary	0-10 (10) – (10) 0-10	Down	Clonmel
				Referee: Anthony Nolan

2 February 2020 2	Louth	1-07 (10) – (11) 0-11	Tipperary	Drogheda
				Venue: Gaelic Grounds
				Referee: John Hickey

9 February 2020 3	Derry	0-10 (10) – (05) 0-05	Tipperary	Derry
13:00				Venue: Celtic Park
				Referee: Jerome Henry

22 February 2020 4	Tipperary	0-21 (21) – (22) 3-13	Cork	Thurles
				Venue: Semple Stadium
				Referee: Brendan Cawley

1 March 2020 5	Longford	3-12 (21) – (16) 3-07	Tipperary	Longford
				Venue: Pearse Park
				Referee: Niall McKenna

18 October 2020 6	Tipperary	1-16 (19) – (16) 0-16	Offaly	Thurles
16:00 IST (UTC+1)				Venue: Semple Stadium

25 October 2020 7	Leitrim	0-15 (15) – (17) 2-11	Tipperary	Carrick-on-Shannon
14:00 GMT (UTC+0)				Venue: Páirc Seán Mac Diarmada
				Referee: Padraig Hughes (Armagh)

=== Munster Senior Football Championship ===
Quarter-finals
Waterford	0-9
Limerick	2-14
Tipperary	2-11
Clare	1-11

Semi-finals
Limerick	2-11
Tipperary	1-15
Cork	1-12
Kerry	0-13

Final
Tipperary	0-17
Cork	0-14

1 November 2020 Quarter-final	Tipperary	2–11 (17) – (14) 1–11	Clare	Thurles
13:00 GMT (UTC+0)		(HT: 1-06 – 0-05)		Venue: Semple Stadium
	Gls: C Sweeney 1, B Maher 1. Pts: C Sweeney 4 (2f); J Kennedy 3 (3f); L Casey 2; L Boland 1, E Moloney 1.	Report	Gls: J Feehan 1 (og). Pts: E Cleary 4 (4f); K Sexton 2 (2f), P Collins 2; Gary Brennan 1, C O'Connor 1, J Malone 1.	Referee: Conor Lane (Cork)

7 November 2020 Semi-final	Limerick	2–11 (17) – (18) 1–15 (a.e.t.)	Tipperary	Limerick
13:15 GMT (UTC+0)		(HT: 2–6 – 0–5)		Venue: LIT Gaelic Grounds
	Gls: S McSweeney 1, C Fahey 1 Pts: S McSweeney 2, H Bourke 2 (2f), D O’Sullivan (1f, ’45) 2, T Griffin 1, K Ryan 1, D Treacy 1, C Sheehan 1, C Fahey 1.	Report	Gls: L Casey 1 Pts: C Sweeney 7 (5f), J Kennedy 2 (2f), L Boland 2, M Quinlivan 1, K Fahey 1, R Kiely 1, B Fox 1.	Referee: Maurice Deegan (Laois)

RTÉ

22 November 2020
13:30 GMT (UTC+0)
Final

Report

Tipperary	0-17 (17) – (14) 0-14	Cork
(HT: 0-11 - 0-07)
Pts: C Sweeney 7 (2fs, 2m); M Quinlivan 5 (1f); L Casey 2 (f); K Fahey 1, E Comerford 1 (free), P Austin 1.		Pts: L Connolly 4 (2fs, 1 45), M Collins 4 (4fs); J O’Rourke 2; C O’Callaghan 1, B Hurley 1, S White 1, C O’Mahony 1 (f).

Páirc Uí Chaoimh, Cork
Referee: Maurice Deegan (Laois)

=== All-Ireland Senior Football Championship ===
RTÉ
Sky Sports

6 December 2020
15:30 GMT (UTC+0)
Semi-Final

Report

Mayo	5-20 (35) – (22) 3-13	Tipperary
(HT: 4-12 – 1-05)
Gls: C O'Connor 4, D O'Connor 1. Pts: C O’Connor 9 (6fs); T Conroy 4 (1m); D Coen 2; M Ruane 1, P Durcan 1, K McLoughlin 1, A O’Shea 1, C Loftus 1.		Gls: C Sweeney 1, B Fox 1, P Feehan 1. Pts: C Sweeney 9 (8fs); C O’Riordan 2; S O’Brien 1, K Fahey 1.

Croke Park, Dublin
Referee: David Gough ((Meath)
Attendance: 0 (Note: The game was played behind closed doors due to the COVID-19 pandemic in the Republic of Ireland)

== Awards ==
In January 2021, Kevin Fahey, Bill Maher, Colin O’Riordan and Conor Sweeney were nominated for an All-Star award.

On 19 February 2021, Conor Sweeney was named at full-forward on the All-Star team for 2020, becoming the third ever Tipperary player to win an All-Star award.
