= 2024 Tipperary Senior Football Championship =

County Gaelic Games competition

- Dates: 3 August 2024 - 20 October 2024
- Teams: 13
- Sponsor: FBD Insurance
- Champions: Loughmore–Castleiney (16th title); Liam Treacy (captain); Shane Hennessy (manager)
- Runners-up: Clonmel Commercials; Jack Kennedy (captain); Tommy Morrissey (manager)

Tournament statistics
- Matches played: 23
- Goals scored: 39 (1.7 per match)
- Points scored: 565 (24.57 per match)
- Top scorer(s): Liam McGrath (1-27)

The 2023 Tipperary Senior Football Championship was the 132nd staging of the Tipperary Senior Football Championship since its establishment by the Tipperary County Board in 1887.

Clonmel Commercials were the defending champions and lost in the final to Loughmore–Castleiney.

== Team changes ==
=== To Championship ===
Promoted from the Tipperary Intermediate Football Championship

- Grangemockler–Ballyneale GAA

=== From Championship ===
Relegated to the Tipperary Intermediate Football Championship

- Éire Óg Annacarty
- Moycarkey–Borris
- Rockwell Rovers

== Format change ==
At the February county board meeting, former football board chairperson Conor O'Dwyer confirmed that Drom & Inch would not be fielding a team in the 2024 Tipperary senior football championship. Following a proposal from Ardfinnan, which was passed by 32 votes to 16, it was confirmed that there would be no relegation from this year's senior football championship, and that Drom & Inch would compete in the Tipperary Intermediate Football Championship in 2025. The group stage would consist of one group of four teams, one group of three and one group of six, with the top two teams in each group progressing to the quarter-finals, along with the 3rd and 4th placed teams in the group of six. All other teams entered the Tom Cusack Cup.

== Group stage ==
The draw for the group stage took place on 18 April 2024.

Advance to quarter-finals

=== Group 1 ===
| Team | Matches | | | | Score | | | Pts |
| Team | Pld | W | D | L | For | Against | Diff | Pts |
|---|---|---|---|---|---|---|---|---|
| Kilsheelan–Kilcash | 3 | 2 | 0 | 1 | 3-35 | 1-30 | +11 | 4 |
| JK Brackens | 3 | 2 | 0 | 1 | 2-36 | 3-29 | +4 | 4 |
| Ardfinnan | 3 | 1 | 1 | 1 | 3-29 | 2-35 | -3 | 3 |
| Grangemockler–Ballyneale | 3 | 0 | 1 | 2 | 0-29 | 2-35 | -12 | 1 |

==== Results ====
| 3 August 2024 Round 1 | Grangemockler–Ballyneale | 0-6 – 0-12 | JK Brackens | Cashel |
| 19:00 | Sean O'Meara (2f) and Manus McFadden (1f) 0-2 each, Leon Kennedy and Paudie O'Shea 0-1 each | Report | Jack Kennedy 0-6 (4f), Dean McEnroe 0-3 (1f), Paddy Cadell, Eanna McBride and Jamie Ormond 0-1 each | Referee: Tom Loughnane |

| 3 August 2024 Round 1 | Ardfinnan | 1-8 – 0-10 | Kilsheelan–Kilcash | Cahir |
| 19:00 | Darragh O'Leary 1-1, Gerry Cronin, Billy Hewitt and Oisin Ryan 0-2 each, Michael Barlow 0-1 | Report | Jamie Roche 0-3, Sean Freaney and Barry Kehoe 0-2 each, Evan Comerford, Micheal Freaney and Billy Murphy 0-1 each | Referee: Seanie Peters |

| 17 August 2024 Round 2 | Grangemockler–Ballyneale | 0-10 – 1-13 | Kilsheelan–Kilcash | Carrick |
| 17:30 | Mark O'Meara 0-5 (1f), Sean O'Meara 0-2 (1f), Manus McFadden, Leon Kennedy and Brian Walsh 0-1 each | Report | Jamie Roche 0-6 (4f), Liam Freaney 1-1, Evan Comerford 0-2 (2f), Tommy O'Connor, Mark Kehoe, Conor Davin-Murphy and Tadhg McGuire 0-1 each | Referee: Seanie Peters |

| 18 August 2024 Round 2 | Ardfinnan | 1-11 – 2-12 | JK Brackens | Cashel |
| 16:00 | Gerry Cronin 1-0, Michael Barlow 0-3 (1f), Luke O'Brien, Oisin Ryan and Billy Hewitt (1f) 0-2 each, Michael O'Sullivan and Shane Ryan 0-1 each | Report | Dean McEnroe 2-2, Jack Kennedy 0-4 (3f), Paddy Cadell and Shane Doyle 0-2 each, Conor Cadell and Lyndon Fairbrother 0-1 each | Referee: David Grogan |

| 31 August 2024 Round 3 | Ardfinnan | 1-10 – 0-13 | Grangemockler–Ballyneale | Monroe |
| 16:00 | Gerry Cronin 1-1 (0-1 45'), Shane Ryan 0-3, Jack O'Neill and Michael Barlow (1f) 0-2 each, Oisin Ryan and Billy Hewitt (1f) 0-1 each | Report | David Power (2f, 1 45') and Mark O'Meara (2f) 0-3 each, Mickey Lyons (1f) 0-2, Thomas Regan, Michael Meaney, Ben Comerford, Sean O'Meara and Lorcan Magorrian 0-1 each | Referee: Willie Fitzharris |

| 31 August 2024 Round 3 | Kilsheelan–Kilcash | 2-12 – 0-12 | JK Brackens | Cashel |
| 16:00 | Jamie Roche 0-6 (6f), Mark Kehoe 1-1, Liam Freaney 1-0, Billy O'Connor 0-2, Evan Comerford (1 45'), Conor Neville and Barry Kehoe 0-1 each | Report | Jack Kennedy 0-7 (5f, 1m), Paddy Cadell 0-2, Lyndon Fairbrother, Jamie Ormond and James Corcoran 0-1 each | Referee: Sean Lonergan |

=== Group 2 ===
| Team | Matches | | | | Score | | | Pts |
| Team | Pld | W | D | L | For | Against | Diff | Pts |
|---|---|---|---|---|---|---|---|---|
| Ballina | 2 | 1 | 0 | 1 | 2-15 | 0-19 | +2 | 2 |
| Cahir | 2 | 1 | 0 | 1 | 0-20 | 1-16 | +1 | 2 |
| Upperchurch–Drombane | 2 | 1 | 0 | 1 | 1-17 | 2-17 | -3 | 2 |

==== Results ====
| 4 August 2024 Round 1 | Cahir | 0-10 – 0-8 | Ballina | The Ragg |
| 14:30 | Conor O'Brien 0-7 (5f), Kevin Grogan, Liam Casey and Craig Guiry 0-1 each | Report | Teddy Doyle 0-4 (3f), Jack O'Mahoney and Ben King (2f) 0-2 each | Referee: Sean Everard |

| 16 August 2024 Round 2 | Cahir | 0-10 – 1-8 | Upperchurch–Drombane | Dundrum |
| 19:00 | Conor O'Brien 0-5 (5f), Ian Flannery and Craig Guiry 0-2 each, Nicholas Reidy 0-1 | Report | Conor Fahey 1-1, Paul Shanahan 0-4 (4f), Luke Shanahan 0-2, Niall Grant 0-1 | Referee: Derek O'Mahoney |

| 30 August 2024 Round 3 | Ballina | 2-7 – 0-9 | Upperchurch–Drombane | Newport |
| 18:45 | Charlie King and Jack O'Mahony (0-1m) 1-1 each, Brian Carson 0-2, Tom Lee, David Kelly and Josh Egan 0-1 each | Report | Luke Shanahan 0-3 (2f), Paul Shanahan (2f) and Conor Fahey 0-2 each, Niall Grant and Sean Ryan 0-1 each | Referee: Seanie Peters |

=== Group 3 ===
| Team | Matches | | | | Score | | | Pts |
| Team | Pld | W | D | L | For | Against | Diff | Pts |
|---|---|---|---|---|---|---|---|---|
| Moyle Rovers | 3 | 3 | 0 | 0 | 6-24 | 3-18 | +15 | 6 |
| Loughmore–Castleiney | 3 | 2 | 1 | 0 | 4-27 | 1-28 | +8 | 5 |
| Clonmel Commercials | 3 | 1 | 1 | 1 | 3-42 | 4-29 | +10 | 3 |
| Arravale Rovers | 3 | 1 | 0 | 2 | 3-27 | 4-36 | -12 | 2 |
| Killenaule | 3 | 1 | 0 | 2 | 1-20 | 1-19 | +1 | 2 |
| Ballyporeen | 3 | 0 | 0 | 3 | 3-28 | 7-38 | -22 | 0 |

==== Results ====
| 3 August 2024 Round 1 | Clonmel Commercials | 2-16 – 0-8 | Arravale Rovers | Bansha |
| 19:00 | Cian Smith 2-3, Jack Kennedy 0-4 (1f), Ross Peters, Peter McGarry and Michael Murphy 0-2 each, Ryan Lambe, Rory O'Dowd and Padraic Looram 0-1 each | Report | Orrin Jones 0-6 (6f), Brendan Delaney and Eoin Doocey 0-1 each | Referee: Jonathan Cullen |

| 3 August 2024 Round 1 | Killenaule | 0-7 – 1-10 | Loughmore–Castleiney | Littleton |
| 19:00 | Michael Doyle 0-2, Jimmy Feehan, Ciaran O'Dwyer, Paudie Feehan, Oisin Shelly and Fionn Fitzgerald 0-1 each | Report | Liam Treacy 1-2, Tomas McGrath and Ciaran McGrath 0-2 each, Noel McGrath, Eamon Connolly, Aidan McGrath and Liam McGrath 0-1 each | Referee: Tom McGlinchey |

| 4 August 2024 Round 1 | Moyle Rovers | 4-12 – 2-7 | Ballyporeen | New Inn |
| 14:00 | Dean English 3-0, Ger O'Sullivan 0-4, Brian McKeown 1-0, Liam Boland 0-3 (1f), Riain Quigley 0-2, Rory Collins, Ben Owens and Shane Foley 0-1 each | Report | Conor Sweeney 2-6 (0-4f), Sam McGrath 0-1 | Referee: Derek O'Mahoney |

| 16 August 2024 Round 2 | Moyle Rovers | w/o – scr. | Killenaule | Fethard |
| 19:00 |

| 16 August 2024 Round 2 | Clonmel Commercials | 0-15 – 2-9 | Loughmore–Castleiney | Clonoulty |
| 19:00 | Jack Kennedy (2f) and Cian Smith (4f) 0-4 each, Peter McGarry and Sean O'Connor (1m) 0-2 each, Michael Murphy, Ross Peters and Cathal Deely 0-1 each | Report | Liam McGrath 1-4 (1-0p, 0-4f), Ciaran McGrath 1-1, Tomas McGrath, John Ryan, Eamon Connolly and Philip O'Connell (1m) 0-1 each | Referee: Sean Lonergan |

| 17 August 2024 Round 2 | Ballyporeen | 1-12 – 2-13 | Arravale Rovers | New Inn |
| 15:00 | Conor Sweeney 0-7 (4f), Glen Walsh 1-0, Tommy Sweeney 0-3, Darragh Lyons and Charlie English 0-1 each | Report | Alex Webster 2-1, Paddy Dalton 0-3, Eoin Doocey and Shane Leahy 0-2 each, Darren Heuston (1f), Brendan Delaney, Micheal Lowry, Niall Sharpe and Eoghan Lonergan 0-1 each | Referee: Joe Leahy |

| 1 September 2024 Round 3 | Moyle Rovers | 2-12 – 1-11 | Clonmel Commercials | Kilsheelan |
| 15:30 | Liam Boland 1-5 (1-1f), Dean English 1-0, Riain Quigley 0-3, Stephen Quirke 0-2 (1f), Dara Ryan and Rory Collins 0-1 each | Report | Sean O'Connor 1-4 (0-1f), Cian Smith 0-3 (1f), Jason Lonergan, Cathal Deely, Kevin Fahey and Peter McGarry 0-1 each | Referee: Sean Everard |

| 1 September 2024 Round 3 | Killenaule | 1-13 – 0-9 | Ballyporeen | Ardfinnan |
| 15:30 | Paudie Feehan 1-1 (0-1f), Joe O'Dwyer (1 45') 0-3, Luke Ryan, Oisin Shelly and Tom Stakelum 0-2 each, Eoin O'Connell, Fionn Fitzgerald and David McCormack 0-1 each | Report | Darragh Brennan 0-6 (3f), Tomas Vaughan 0-2, Paudie Fitzgerald 0-1 | Referee: Derek O'Mahoney |

| 1 September 2024 Round 3 | Loughmore–Castleiney | 1-8 – 1-6 | Arravale Rovers | Dundrum |
| 15:30 | Liam McGrath 0-5 (4f), Tommy Maher 1-0, Noel McGrath 0-2, Daragh McCahey 0-1 | Report | Orrin Jones 1-0, Darren Heuston 0-2 (2f), Eoin Doocey, Niall Sharpe, Paddy Dalton and Cian Ryan 0-1 each | Referee: Seamus Delaney |

== Tom Cusack Cup ==
=== Semi-finals ===
| 22 September 2024 Semi-Final | Killenaule | 2-15 – 0-12 | Ardfinnan | Kilsheelan |
| 12:00 | Fionn Fitzgerald 0-6 (4f), Paudie Feehan (0-1f) and Eoin Shaw 1-2 each, Darragh Fitzgerald 0-2, Joe O'Dwyer (1f), Luke Ryan and Oisin Shelly 0-1 each | Report | Michael Barlow 0-5 (2f), James O'Mahoney 0-4, Billy Hewitt 0-3 (2f) | Referee: Brian Tyrrell |

| 22 September 2024 Semi-Final | Grangemockler–Ballyneale | 1-13 – 0-20 | Ballyporeen | Kilsheelan |
| 13:30 | | | | Referee: Donnie Horan |

=== Final ===
| 6 October 2024 Final | Ballyporeen | 1-10 – 2-16 | Killenaule | Ardfinnan |
| 16:30 | Conor Sweeney 1-3 (1-0p, 0-2f), Darragh Brennan 0-5 (2f), Mikey Maher 0-2 | Report | Fionn Fitzgerald 0-7 (6f), Micheal Doyle 1-1, Joe O'Dwyer 0-4 (3f), Paudie Feehan 1-0 (p), Dara Fitzgerald 0-2, Eoin O'Connell and Oisin Shelly 0-1 each | Referee: Brian Tyrell |

== Knockout stage ==
=== Bracket ===
Quarter-finals
22 September, Templetuohy
Loughmore–Castleiney | 2-12
JK Brackens | 0-11
21 September, New Inn
Moyle Rovers | 0-14
Arravale Rovers | 0-5
22 September, The Ragg
Ballina | 0-6
Clonmel Commercials | 1-12
21 September, Ardfinnan
Kilsheelan–Kilcash | 2-13
Cahir | 1-14

Semi-finals
6 October, Cashel
Loughmore–Castleiney | 2-16
Moyle Rovers | 0-5
6 October, Cashel
Clonmel Commercials | 0-16
Kilsheelan–Kilcash | 0-5

Final
20 October, Semple Stadium
Loughmore–Castleiney | 0-11
Clonmel Commercials | 0-7

=== Quarter-finals ===
| 21 September 2024 Quarter-Final | Moyle Rovers | 0-14 – 0-5 | Arravale Rovers | New Inn |
| 16:30 | Liam Boland 0-6 (6f), Riain Quigley 0-3, Luke Boland, Brian McKeown, Dean English, Stephen Quirke (1m) and Ger O'Sullivan 0-1 each | Report | Eoin Doocey 0-2 (2f), Darren Heuston (1f), Micheal Lowry and Eoghan Lonergan 0-1 each | Referee: Tom Loughnane |

| 21 September 2024 Quarter-Final | Kilsheelan–Kilcash | 2-13 – 1-14 | Cahir | Ardfinnan |
| 16:30 | Jamie Roche 1-2, Mark Kehoe 0-5, Daire Brennan 1-0, Evan Comerford 0-2, Michael Freaney, Tommy O'Connor, Barry Kehoe and Conor Davin Murphy 0-1 each | Report | Craig Guiry 0-5, Stephen Grogan 1-1, Niall McKenna 0-3, Kevin Grogan and Dylan Butler 0-2 each, Ian Flannery 0-1 | Referee: Seanie Peters |

| 22 September 2024 Quarter-Final | Loughmore–Castleiney | 2-12 – 0-11 | JK Brackens | Templetuohy |
| 15:30 | Liam McGrath 0-5 (4f), John McGrath 0-4 (1f), Tommy Maher and Eamonn Connolly 1-0 each, Eoin O'Connell, Noel McGrath and Daragh McCahey 0-1 each | Report | Jack Kennedy 0-7 (4f), Paddy Cadell 0-2, Shane Doyle and Jamie Ormond 0-1 each | Referee: Derek O'Mahoney |

| 22 September 2024 Quarter-Final | Ballina | 0-6 – 1-12 | Clonmel Commercials | The Ragg |
| 15:30 | Jack O'Mahoney (1f) 0-2, Charlie King, Harry Byrne, Cathal O'Donnell and Ben King 0-1 each | Report | Sean O'Connor 1-3 (1-0p, 0-1f), Cian Smith 0-3 (2f), Jack Kennedy (1f) 0-2, Michael Quinlivan, Jason Lonergan, Joe Higgins and Aldo Matassa 0-1 each | Referee: Sean Everard |

=== Semi-finals ===
| 6 October 2024 Semi-Final | Loughmore–Castleiney | 2-16 – 0-5 | Moyle Rovers | Cashel |
| 13:00 | Liam McGrath 0-7 (5f), Philip O'Connell 1-1, Ciaran McGrath 1-0, Liam Treacy 0-2, Lorcan Egan, Eoin O'Connell, Noel McGrath, Brian McGrath, Eamonn Connolly and Conor Ryan 0-1 each | Report | Liam Boland (2f) and Rian Quigley 0-2 each, Ger O'Sullivan 0-1 | Referee: Derek O'Mahoney |

| 6 October 2024 Semi-Final | Clonmel Commercials | 0-16 – 0-5 | Kilsheelan–Kilcash | Cashel |
| 14:45 | Sean O'Connor 0-9 (4f, 2m), Peter McGarry 0-3, Jason Lonergan, Jack Kennedy (1f), Cian Smith and Ross Peters 0-1 each | Report | Liam Freaney 0-2, Evan Comerford (1 45'), Mark Stokes and Jamie Roche (1f) 0-1 each | Referee: Joe Leahy |

=== Final ===
| 20 October 2024 Final | Loughmore–Castleiney | 0-11 – 0-7 | Clonmel Commercials | Semple Stadium |
| 16:00 | Liam McGrath 0-5 (3f), Liam Treacy and Brian McGrath 0-2 each, Eoin O'Connell and Noel McGrath 0-1 each | Report | Sean O'Connor 0-2 (1f), Tadhg Conlon, Cathal Deely (1m), Padraic Looram, Peter McGarry and Cian Smith 0-1 each | Referee: Sean Everard |

== Championship statistics ==
=== Top scorers ===
==== Overall ====
| Rank | Player | Club | Tally | Total | Matches | Average |
|---|---|---|---|---|---|---|
| 1 | Liam McGrath | Loughmore–Castleiney | 1-27 | 30 | 6 | 5 |
| 2 | Sean O'Connor | Clonmel Commercials | 2-20 | 26 | 5 | 5.2 |
| 3 | Jack Kennedy | JK Brackens | 0-24 | 24 | 4 | 6 |
| 4 | Jamie Roche | Kilsheelan–Kilcash | 1-18 | 21 | 5 | 4.2 |
| 4 | Cian Smith | Clonmel Commercials | 2-15 | 21 | 6 | 3.5 |
| 6 | Conor Sweeney | Ballyporeen | 2-13 | 19 | 2 | 9.5 |
| 6 | Liam Boland | Moyle Rovers | 1-16 | 19 | 4 | 4.75 |
| 8 | Dean English | Moyle Rovers | 4-1 | 13 | 4 | 3.25 |
| 9 | Conor O'Brien | Cahir | 0-12 | 12 | 3 | 4 |
| 10 | Dean McEnroe | JK Brackens | 2-5 | 11 | 3 | 3.67 |
| 10 | Jack Kennedy | Clonmel Commercials | 0-11 | 11 | 5 | 2.2 |

==== In a single game ====
| Rank | Player | Club | Tally | Total | Opposition |
|---|---|---|---|---|---|
| 1 | Conor Sweeney | Ballyporeen | 2-6 | 12 | Moyle Rovers |
| 2 | Dean English | Moyle Rovers | 3-0 | 9 | Ballyporeen |
| 2 | Cian Smith | Clonmel Commercials | 2-3 | 9 | Arravale Rovers |
| 2 | Sean O'Connor | Clonmel Commercials | 0-9 | 9 | Moyle Rovers |
| 5 | Dean McEnroe | JK Brackens | 2-2 | 8 | Ardfinnan |
| 5 | Liam Boland | Moyle Rovers | 1-5 | 8 | Clonmel Commercials |
| 7 | Alex Webster | Arravale Rovers | 2-1 | 7 | Ballyporeen |
| 7 | Liam McGrath | Loughmore–Castleiney | 1-4 | 7 | Clonmel Commercials |
| 7 | Sean O'Connor | Clonmel Commercials | 1-4 | 7 | Moyle Rovers |
| 7 | Jack Kennedy | JK Brackens | 0-7 | 7 | Kilsheelan–Kilcash |
| 7 | Jack Kennedy | JK Brackens | 0-7 | 7 | Loughmore–Castleiney |
| 7 | Conor Sweeney | Ballyporeen | 0-7 | 7 | Arravale Rovers |
| 7 | Conor O'Brien | Cahir | 0-7 | 7 | Ballina |
| 7 | Liam McGrath | Loughmore–Castleiney | 0-7 | 7 | Moyle Rovers |
