= Alan Campbell =

Alan Campbell may refer to:

== In arts and entertainment ==
- Alan Campbell (actor) (born 1957), American TV actor in Jake and the Fatman
- Alan Campbell (screenwriter) (1904–1963), American film scriptwriter
- Alan Campbell (writer) (born 1971), Scottish fantasy novelist

== In sport ==
- Alan Campbell (footballer, born 1944) (born 1944), Northern Irish footballer
- Alan Campbell (Gaelic footballer) (born 1991), Irish Gaelic football player
- Alan Campbell (Irish footballer) (born 1960), Irish international
- Alan Campbell (rower) (born 1983), British Olympic sculler
- Alan Campbell (Scottish footballer) (born 1948), Scottish midfielder

== In government, politics and religion ==
- Alan Campbell (pastor) (1949–2017), Northern Ireland
- Sir Alan Campbell (politician) (born 1957), British Labour MP
- Alan Campbell, Baron Campbell of Alloway (1917–2013), British judge and peer
- Sir Alan Campbell (diplomat) (1919–2007), British ambassador
- Alan K. Campbell (1923–1998), American government official

== See also ==
- Al Campbell (disambiguation)
- Alan Campbell-Swinton (1863–1930), Scottish electrical engineer
- Allan Campbell (disambiguation)
- Allen Campbell (1956–1994), trainer of Tyke (elephant)
- Allen G. Campbell (1834–1902), delegate from Utah Territory to the U.S. House of Representatives
