= Steven O'Brien (dual player) =

Irish Gaelic footballer and hurler

Personal information
- Born: 22 December 1994 (age 31) Ballina, County Tipperary, Ireland
- Occupation: Student

Sport
- Sport: Gaelic football
- Position: Centre-forward
Club
- Years: Club
- Ballina
Club titles
- Tipperary titles: 0
Inter-county*
Years	County	Apps (scores)
2013-present	Tipperary	9 (0-9)
Inter-county titles
- Munster titles: 1
- All-Irelands: 1
- NFL: 0
- All Stars: 0
- *Inter County team apps and scores correct as of 19:22, 1 August 2015.

Steven O'Brien (born 22 December 1994) is an Irish Gaelic footballer and hurler who has played for the Tipperary senior hurling and football teams.

Born in Ballina, County Tipperary, O'Brien first played competitive Gaelic games during his schooling at Nenagh CBS. He arrived on the inter-county scene at the age of fifteen when he first linked up with the Tipperary minor teams as a dual player before later joining the under-21 sides. He made his senior football debut during the 2013 championship. O'Brien immediately became a regular member of the starting fifteen.

At club level O'Brien is a one-time championship medallist in the intermediate grade as a hurler with Ballina.

O'Brien made his debut for the Tipperary hurlers in the 2014 Waterford Crystal Cup final victory against Clare and was a member of the Tipperary hurling panel in 2016 which went on to win the All-Ireland title. He made his debut as a late substitute against Clare on 3 April 2016. He made his first league start for Tipperary against Dublin on 11 February 2017 in the 2017 National Hurling League.

In October 2017, O'Brien confirmed that he will be playing with the Tipperary senior football team in 2018 after two years with the Tipperary hurling team.

On 22 November 2020, Tipperary won the 2020 Munster Senior Football Championship after a 0–17 to 0–14 win against Cork in the final. It was Tipperary's first Munster title in 85 years.

== Honours ==
=== Player ===
Ballina

- Tipperary Intermediate Hurling Championship (1): 2013
- North Tipperary Junior A Football Championship (2): 2020, 2021
- Tipperary Junior A Football Championship (1): 2021

St Joseph's CBS, Nenagh

- Dr. Croke Cup (1): 2011–12

Tipperary Football

- National League (Division 4) (1): 2015
- Munster Under-21 Football Championship (1): 2015
- All-Ireland Minor Football Championship (1): 2011
- Munster Minor Football Championship (2): 2011, 2012
- Munster Senior Football Championship (1): 2020

Tipperary Hurling

- All-Ireland Senior Hurling Championship (1): 2016
- Munster Senior Hurling Championship (1): 2016
- All-Ireland Minor Hurling Championship (1): 2012
- Munster Minor Hurling Championship (1): 2012
- Waterford Crystal Cup (1): 2014
