= Jason Lonergan =

Irish Gaelic footballer

Personal information
- Native name: Iásón Ó Lonargáin (Irish)
- Nickname: Badger
- Born: 1994 (age 31–32) Clonmel, County Tipperary, Ireland

Sport
- Sport: Gaelic football
- Position: Left corner-forward
Club
- Years: Club
- Clonmel Commercials
Club titles
- Tipperary titles: 1
Inter-county*
| Years | County | Apps (scores) |
| 2015- | Tipperary | 4 (0-00) |
Inter-county titles
- Munster titles: 1
- All-Irelands: 0
- NFL: 0
- All Stars: 0
- *Inter County team apps and scores correct as of 18:22, 1 August 2015.

Jason Lonergan (born 1994) is an Irish Gaelic footballer who plays as a left corner-forward for the Tipperary senior team.

Born in Clonmel, County Tipperary, Lonergan first played competitive Gaelic football during his schooling at CBS High School Clonmel. He arrived on the inter-county scene at the age of sixteen when he first linked up with the Tipperary minor team before later joining the under-21 side. He made his senior debut during the 2015 championship. Lonergan immediately became a regular member of the starting fifteen.

At club level Lonergan is a one-time championship medal with Clonmel Commercials.

On 22 November 2020, Lonergan was a substitute as Tipperary won the 2020 Munster Senior Football Championship after a 0–17 to 0–14 win against Cork in the final. It was Tipperary's first Munster title in 85 years.

== Honours ==
=== Player ===
Clonmel Commercials

- Tipperary Senior Football Championship (1): 2012

Tipperary

- Munster Under-21 Football Championship (1): 2015 (c)
- All-Ireland Minor Football Championship (1): 2011
- Munster Minor Football Championship (2): 2011, 2012
- Munster Senior Football Championship (1): 2020
