= Ian Fahey =

Irish Gaelic footballer

Personal information
- Native name: Iain Ó Fathaigh (Irish)
- Nickname: Terrence
- Born: 29 June 1994 (age 32) Clonmel, County Tipperary, Ireland
- Height: 6 ft 7 in (201 cm)

Sport
- Sport: Gaelic football
- Position: Centre-forward
Club
- Years: Club
- Clonmel Commercials
Club titles
- Tipperary titles: 1
Inter-county*
Years	County	Apps (scores)
2013-present	Tipperary	7 (0-00)
Inter-county titles
- Munster titles: 0
- All-Irelands: 0
- NFL: 0
- All Stars: 0
- *Inter County team apps and scores correct as of 19:44, 1 August 2015.

Ian Fahey (born 29 June 1994) is an Irish Gaelic footballer who plays as a centre-forward for the Tipperary senior team.

== Life ==
Born in Clonmel, County Tipperary, Fahey first arrived on the inter-county scene at the age of sixteen when he first linked up with the Tipperary minor team before later joining the under-21 side. He made his senior debut during the 2013 championship. Fahey immediately became a regular member of the starting fifteen and has won one National League (Division 4) medal. He is known for his versatility, playing corner forward but tracking back.

At club level Fahey is a 5 time championship winner with Clonmel Commercials. He also plays soccer for Moyglass united and hurling for Carrick Davins.

== Honours ==
=== Player ===
Clonmel Commercials

- Tipperary Senior Football Championship (1): 2012

Tipperary

- National Football League (Division 4) (1): 2015
- Munster Under-21 Football Championship (1): 2015
- All-Ireland Minor Football Championship (1): 2011
- Munster Minor Football Championship (2): 2011, 2012
