= Colin O'Riordan =

Irish Australian rules footballer

- Cóilín Ó Ríordáin
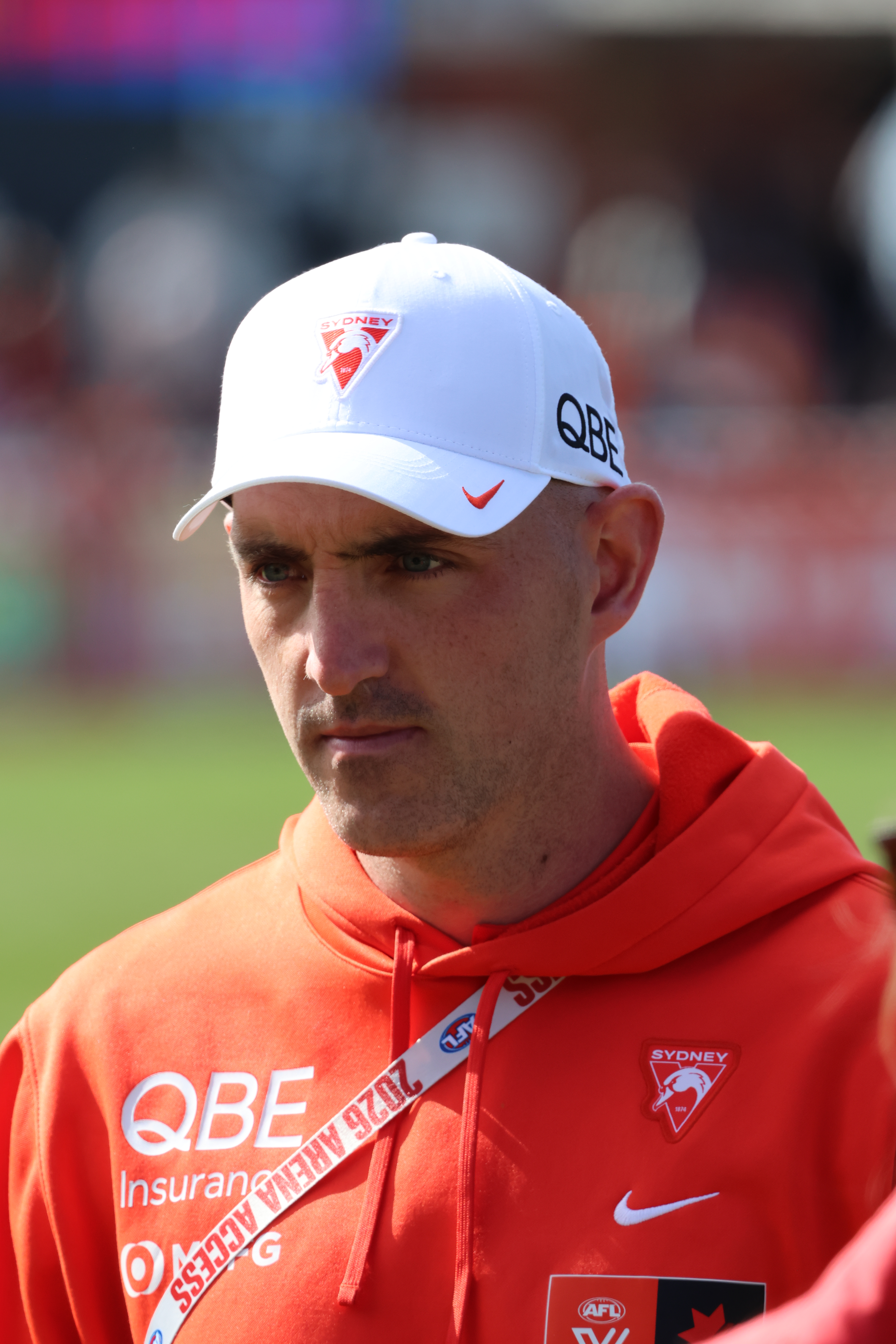
- O'Riordan in August 2026
- Born: 12 October 1995 (age 31); Templemore, County Tipperary
- Height: 187 cm (74 in)
Australian rules football career
Personal information
- Original team: Tipperary
- Debut: Round 17, 2018
- Weight: 87 kg (192 lb)
- Position: Halfback
Club information
- Current club: Sydney (women's coach)
Playing career^{1}
Years	Club	Games (Goals)
2015–2022	Sydney	34 (1)
Coaching career^{3}
Years	Club	Games (W–L–D)
2026–	Sydney (women's)	2 (2–0–0)
2026	Representative; Ireland (women's)	1 (0–1–0)
Total		3 (2–1–0)
- ^{1} Playing statistics correct to the end of round 23, 2022.^{3} Coaching statistics correct as of round 2, 2026.
- Gaelic games career
- Sport: Gaelic Football
- Position: Midfield
Club
- Years: Club
- 2012—2015: J.K. Bracken's
College
- Years: College
- UCD
Inter-county
Years	County	Apps (scores)
2014–2015 2020	Tipperary	9 (2-8)
Inter-county titles
- Munster titles: 1
- NFL: 1

Colin O'Riordan (born 12 October 1995) is an Irish former professional Australian rules footballer for the Sydney Swans in the Australian Football League (AFL) and the current coach of the Sydney Swans AFLW side. Before leaving Ireland O'Riordan played Gaelic football as a midfielder for the Tipperary senior team.

== Early life ==
Born in Templemore, County Tipperary, O'Riordan first played competitive Gaelic games during his schooling at Our Lady's Secondary School. He arrived on the inter-county scene at the age of fifteen when he first linked up with the Tipperary minors teams as a dual player before later joining the under-21 sides.

O'Riordan's father, Michael, and his brothers, Kevin and Alan, have also played at various levels with Tipperary.

== Gaelic football ==
O’Riordan started the 2011 All-Ireland minor football final for Tipperary at wing back. Tipperary went on to beat Dublin narrowly.

O’Riordan played a pivotal role in the journey to the 2015 u21 All-Ireland football final loss to Tyrone.

O'Riordan made his senior debut during the 2014 league. O'Riordan immediately became a regular member of the starting fifteen and has won one National League (Division 4) medal.

At club level O'Riordan plays both Gaelic football and hurling with J. K. Bracken's.

On 22 November 2020, O'Riordan who had returned to Ireland had permission from the Sydney Swans to play for Tipperary in the 2020 Munster Final, which Tipperary won 0–17 to 0–14 against Cork. It was Tipperary's first Munster title in 85 years.

In January 2021, O'Riordan was nominated for an All-Star award.

== AFL ==
=== Playing career ===
In October 2015, O'Riordan signed a rookie contract with the Sydney Swans in the AFL.

In 2018, O'Riordan trained under 2005 premiership Swan Tadhg Kennelly. On 15 July 2018, O'Riordan became the third Irish player to play for Sydney, making his debut in round 17 against North Melbourne.

In August 2022, O'Riordan announced his retirement from the AFL due to a chronic hip injury. He played 34 games since joining the Sydney Swans in October 2015.

=== Coaching career ===
Following his retirement, he remained at Sydney in various coaching roles including AFL Women's (AFLW) assistant coach and male academy head coach. Ahead of the 2026 season, he was named as the Swans' AFLW senior coach. This made him the first Irish senior coach in the history of the VFL/AFL and AFLW.

== Statistics ==
Updated to the end of round 23, 2022.

Legend
G	Goals	K	Kicks	D	Disposals	T	Tackles
B	Behinds	H	Handballs	M	Marks

Season	Team	No.	Games	Totals							Averages (per game)						
Season	Team	No.	Games	G	B	K	H	D	M	T	G	B	K	H	D	M	T
2016	Sydney	38	0	–	–	–	–	–	–	–	–	–	–	–	–	–	–
2017	Sydney	38	0	–	–	–	–	–	–	–	–	–	–	–	–	–	–
2018	Sydney	38	3	0	1	24	25	49	17	7	0.0	0.3	8.0	8.3	16.3	5.7	2.3
2019	Sydney	38	12	1	1	86	83	169	52	27	0.1	0.1	7.2	6.9	14.1	4.3	2.3
2020 (Note: The 2020 season was played with 17 home-and-away matches per team (down from 22) and 16-minute quarters with time on (down from 20-minute quarters with time on) due to the impact of the COVID-19 pandemic.)	Sydney	38	8	0	0	39	37	76	20	13	0.0	0.0	4.9	4.6	9.5	2.5	1.6
2021	Sydney	38	6	0	0	30	15	45	13	6	0.0	0.0	5.0	2.5	7.5	2.2	1.0
2022	Sydney	38	5	0	0	21	15	36	9	1	0.0	0.0	4.2	3.0	7.2	1.8	0.2
Career			34	1	2	200	175	375	111	54	0.0	0.1	5.9	5.1	11.0	3.3	1.6

== Honours ==
Tipperary

- National League (Division 4) (1): 2014
- Munster Under-21 Football Championship (1): 2015 (c)
- All-Ireland Minor Football Championship (1): 2011
- Munster Minor Football Championship (2): 2011, 2012
- Munster Senior Football Championship (1): 2020

Awards

- EirGrid Under-21 Player of the Year (1): 2015

== See also ==
- Irish experiment
