= David Power (Gaelic footballer) =

Irish Gaelic football manager

Personal information
- Native name: Daithí de Paor (Irish)
- Born: 1983 (age 42–43) Kilsheelan, County Tipperary, Ireland

Sport
- Sport: Gaelic football
Inter-county management
- Years: Team
- 2014–2016 2019–2023: Wexford; Tipperary

David Power (born 1983) is an Irish Gaelic football manager. He managed the Tipperary county team from 2019, having previously managed Wexford. In 2020, he led Tipperary to a first Munster Senior Football Championship title for 85 years.

== Career ==
Born in Kilsheelan, County Tipperary, Power played for the Kilsheelan–Kilcash club.

Power went on to become involved in team management and coaching. An All-Ireland-winning manager with Tipperary in the minor grade, he has also taken charge of the Tipperary under-21 and junior teams.

Power was the manager of the senior Wexford county team from 2014 until 2016.

In September 2019, Power was named as the new manager of the Tipperary senior football team on a two-year term.

On 22 November 2020, he managed Tipperary to their first Munster Senior Football Championship title for 85 years.

In the 2020 All-Ireland SFC semi-final on 6 December, Tipperary again faced Mayo. In foggy conditions and losing by 16 points at half-time they eventually lost the game by a scoreline of 5–20 to 3–13.

In September 2021, Power was given a new three-year term in charge of the Tipperary senior football team. He resigned in June 2023, leaving the role vacant until Paul Kelly was appointed in late 2023.

== Honours ==
=== Manager ===
Tipperary

- All-Ireland Minor Football Championship (1): 2011
- Munster Minor Football Championship (2): 2011, 2012
- Munster Senior Football Championship (1): 2020
- Sigerson Cup Football Championship: 2026

Sporting positions
Preceded by Philly Ryan	Tipperary Minor Football Manager; 2008–2012	Succeeded by Charlie McGeever
Preceded by John Evans	Tipperary Under-21 Football Manager; 2012–2014	Succeeded by Tommy Toomey
Preceded by Jim O'Meara	Tipperary Junior Football Manager; 2013–2014	Succeeded by Tommy Toomey
Preceded by Aidan O'Brien	Wexford Senior Football Manager; 2014–2016	Succeeded by Séamus McEnaney
Preceded by Liam Kearns	Tipperary Senior Football Manager; 2019–2023	Succeeded by Paul Kelly
Achievements
Preceded by Raymond Munroe (Tyrone)	All-Ireland MFC winning manager 2011	Succeeded by Dessie Farrell (Dublin)
