= Iron Angel (disambiguation) =

Iron Angel is a speed metal band from Hamburg, Germany.

Iron Angel may also refer to:

- Iron Angel, the second novel of The Deepgate Codex trilogy by Alan Campbell
- Iron Angels, a poetry collection by author Geoffrey A. Landis
- Iron Angel (film), a 1964 American film directed by Ken Kennedy
- Angel (1987 film), a Hong Kong action film also known as Iron Angels
