= Allan Campbell =

Allan Campbell may refer to:

- Allan M. Campbell (1929–2018), American microbiologist and geneticist
- Allan Campbell (Canadian politician) (born 1969), member of the Legislative Assembly of Prince Edward Island
- Allan Campbell (Australian politician) (1836–1898), South Australian MLC and physician
- Allan Campbell (footballer) (born 1998), Scottish footballer

== See also ==
- Al Campbell (disambiguation)
- Alan Campbell (disambiguation)
- Alan Campbell-Swinton (1863–1930), Scottish electrical engineer
- Allen Campbell (1956–1994), trainer of Tyke (elephant)
- Allen G. Campbell (1834–1902), delegate from Utah Territory to the U.S. House of Representatives
