= Alfred Campbell =

Alfred Campbell may refer to:

- Alfred Walter Campbell (1868–1937), Australian neurologist
- Eric Campbell (actor) (Alfred Eric Campbell, 1879–1917), British-born early Hollywood actor

== See also ==
- Al Campbell (disambiguation)
