= Alister Campbell =

Alister Campbell may refer to:

- Alister Campbell (rugby union, born 1959), Scottish rugby union player
- Alister Campbell (rugby union, born 1979), Australian rugby union player

== See also ==
- Alistair Campbell (disambiguation)
