= Al Campbell (disambiguation) =

Al Campbell (born 1954) is a Jamaican reggae singer.

Al Campbell may also refer to:

- Al Campbell (keyboard player) (fl. 1980s), American keyboard player and session musician

== See also ==
- Alan Campbell (disambiguation)
- Albert Campbell (disambiguation)
- Alfred Campbell (disambiguation)
- Alistair Campbell (disambiguation)
