= Jimmy Feehan =

Irish Gaelic footballer

Personal information
- Native name: Séamus Ó Fiacháin (Irish)
- Born: 1995 (age 30–31) Killenaule, County Tipperary, Ireland
- Occupation: Student

Sport
- Sport: Gaelic football
- Position: Left corner-back
Club
- Years: Club
- Killenaule
Club titles
- Tipperary titles: 0
College
- Years: College
- University College Dublin
Inter-county*
Years	County	Apps (scores)
2015-	Tipperary	2 (0-00)
Inter-county titles
- All-Irelands: 0
- NFL: 0
- All Stars: 0
- *Inter County team apps and scores correct as of 185144, 1 August 2015.

James Feehan (born 16 August 1995) is an Irish Gaelic footballer who plays as a left corner-back for the Tipperary senior team.

Born in Killenaule, County Tipperary, Feehan first played competitive Gaelic football during his schooling at Rockwell College. He arrived on the inter-county scene at the age of sixteen when he first linked up with the Tipperary minor team before later joining the under-21 and junior sides. He made his senior debut during the 2015 championship. Feehan immediately became a regular member of the starting fifteen.

At club level Feehan plays with Killenaule.

On 31 July 2016, he started in the half-back line as Tipperary defeated Galway in the 2016 All-Ireland Quarter-finals at Croke Park to reach their first All-Ireland semi-final since 1935. On 21 August 2016, Tipperary were beaten in the semi-final by Mayo on a 2-13 to 0-14 scoreline.

On 22 November 2020, Tipperary won the 2020 Munster Senior Football Championship after a 0-17 to 0-14 win against Cork in the final. It was Tipperary's first Munster title in 85 years.

== Honours ==
=== Player ===
Tipperary

- Munster Under-21 Football Championship (1): 2015
- Munster Minor Football Championship (1): 2012
- Munster Senior Football Championship (1): 2020
