= Evan Comerford (Tipperary Gaelic footballer) =

Irish Gaelic footballer

Personal information
- Native name: Éimhín Mac Cumascaigh (Irish)
- Nickname: Badge
- Born: 18 January 1994 (age 32) Clonmel, County Tipperary, Ireland
- Height: 5 ft 8 in (173 cm)

Sport
- Sport: Gaelic football
- Position: Goalkeeper
Club
- Years: Club
- Carrick Davins
Club titles
- Tipperary titles: 1
College
- Years: College
- PLC in tech
Inter-county*
Years	County	Apps (scores)
2015-	Tipperary	67(0-42)
Inter-county titles
- Munster titles: 1
- All-Irelands: 0
- NFL: 0
- All Stars: 0
- *Inter County team apps and scores correct as of 18:22, 1 August 2015.

Evan Comerford (born 18 January 1994) is an Irish Gaelic footballer who previously played as a goalkeeper for the Tipperary senior team.

== Career ==
Born in Clonmel, County Tipperary, Comerford first arrived on the inter-county scene at the age of sixteen when he first linked up with the Tipperary minors team before later joining the under-21 side. He made his senior debut during the 2015 league. Comerford immediately became a regular member of the starting fifteen. At club level Comerford plays with Kilsheelan–Kilcash.

He made his championship debut in 2015 against Waterford. On 31 July 2016, Comerford started as Tipperary defeated Galway in the 2016 All-Ireland Quarter-finals at Croke Park to reach their first All-Ireland semi-final since 1935. On 21 August 2016, Tipperary were beaten in the semi-final by Mayo on a 2–13 to 0–14 scoreline.

On 30 May 2017, Comerford was handed a 12-week suspension following an incident in a club game on 23 May. He was reported by referee Paddy Russell for minor physical interference after he was sent-off against JK Brackens.

On 22 November 2020, Tipperary won the 2020 Munster Senior Football Championship after a 0–17 to 0–14 win against Cork in the final. It was Tipperary's first Munster title in 85 years.

He has a namesake in the Dublin footballer, Evan Comerford, with whom he has sometimes been confused.

== Honours ==
Tipperary

- Munster Under-21 Football Championship (1): 2015
- All-Ireland Minor Football Championship (1): 2011
- Munster Minor Football Championship (2): 2011, 2012
- National Football League Division 3 (1): 2017
- Munster Senior Football Championship (1): 2020
