= Albert Campbell =

Albert Campbell may refer to:

- Albert J. Campbell (1857–1907), U.S. Representative from Montana
- Albert Campbell (singer) (1872–1947), American pioneer recording artist
- Albert Ralph Campbell (1875–1925), American Medal of Honor recipient
- Albert Campbell (dogsled racer) (1894–1961), Canadian dogsled racer
- Albert Campbell (Canadian politician) (1910–1973)
- Albert Campbell (footballer) (1938–2022), Northern Ireland footballer
- Ken Campbell (basketball) (Albert Kenton Campbell, 1926–1999), American basketball player

== See also ==
- Al Campbell (disambiguation)
