= Alan Campbell (footballer, born 1944) =

Northern Irish footballer

Personal information
- Full name: Thomas Alan Campbell
- Date of birth: 11 September 1944 (age 82)
- Place of birth: Belfast, Northern Ireland
- Height: 1.78 m (5 ft 10 in)
- Position: Left back

Senior career*
Years	Team	Apps	(Gls)
1960–1961	Distillery		
- Sheffield Wednesday
1962–1970	Coleraine		
1970–1973	Grimsby Town	85	(0)
1973–1975	Coleraine		
- Glenavon

International career
1959	Northern Ireland Schoolboys	3	(0)
1962–1964	Northern Ireland Amateurs	4	(0)
1963–1969	Irish League XI	10	

Managerial career
- 1975–1978: Glenavon
- 1979–1982: Ballymena United
- 1983–1985: Distillery
- 1984–1985: Ballymena United
- 1990: Ypsonna
- 1991: Sotira
- 1993: Ballyclare Comrades
- 1997–1999: Bangor
- 2000–2002: Carrick Rangers
- Barn United
- * Club domestic league appearances and goals

Thomas Alan Campbell (born 11 September 1944) is a retired Northern Irish footballer who played as a left back in the Football League for Grimsby Town. After his retirement as a player, he embarked on a long career in management.

== Managerial statistics ==
Managerial record by team and tenure
Team	From	To	Record					Ref
Team	From	To	P	W	D	L	Win %	Ref
Ballymena United	29 January 1979	2 February 1982	140	67	35	38	47.9	
Ballymena United	29 June 1984	30 April 1985	48	18	10	20	37.5	
Total			188	85	45	58	45.2	―

== Honours ==
Ballymena United

- Irish Cup: 1980–81
- Ulster Cup: 1980–81
- County Antrim Shield: 1979–80
