= Brian Fox (Gaelic footballer) =

Irish Gaelic football player

Personal information
- Born: 19 July 1988 (age 38)

Sport
- Sport: Gaelic Football
- Position: Left Half Forward
Club
- Years: Club
- 2006-present: Éire Óg
Inter-county
Years	County	Apps (scores)
2008-2021	Tipperary	28 (2-17)
Inter-county titles
- Munster titles: 1

Brian Fox (born 19 July 1988) is an Irish Gaelic football who plays his club football for Éire Óg and previously at inter-county level for Tipperary. Fox is the nephew of former Tipperary hurler Pat Fox.

== Career ==
He made his championship debut in 2009 against Limerick. On 31 July 2016, Fox started in the half forward line as Tipperary defeated Galway in the 2016 All-Ireland Quarter-finals at Croke Park to reach their first All-Ireland semi-final since 1935. On 21 August 2016, Tipperary were beaten in the semi-final by Mayo on a 2-13 to 0-14 scoreline.

On 8 April 2017, Tipperary captained by Fox won the Division 3 final of the 2017 National Football League after a 3-19 to 0-19 win against Louth in Croke Park.

On 22 November 2020, Tipperary won the 2020 Munster Senior Football Championship after a 0-17 to 0-14 win against Cork in the final. It was Tipperary's first Munster title in 85 years.

In November 2021, Fox announced his retirement from inter-county football after 14 seasons.

== Honours ==
Tipperary

- National Football League Promotion Division 4: 2008
- National Football League Division 3 Winners: 2009
- National Football League Division 4 Winners: 2014
- National Football League Division 3 (1): 2017 (c)
- Munster Senior Football Championship (1): 2020
