= Colm O'Shaughnessy =

Irish Gaelic footballer

Personal information
- Born: 27 December 1996 (age 29)

Sport
- Sport: Gaelic Football
- Position: Corner-back
Club
- Years: Club
- 2014-present: Ardfinnan
Inter-county
Years	County	Apps (scores)
2015-present	Tipperary	7 (0-01)
Inter-county titles
- Munster titles: 1

Colm O'Shaughnessy (born 27 December 1996) is an Irish Gaelic football player who plays at inter-county level for Tipperary, and plays his club football for Ardfinnan in south Tipperary.

== Career ==
O'Shaughnessy made his championship debut for Tipperary in 2015 against Louth. On 31 July 2016, he started at right corner back as Tipperary defeated Galway in the 2016 All-Ireland Quarter-finals at Croke Park to reach their first All-Ireland semi-final since 1935. On 21 August 2016, Tipperary were beaten in the semi-final by Mayo on a 2-13 to 0-14 scoreline, with O'Shaughnessy going off injured in the second half.

On 22 November 2020, Tipperary won the 2020 Munster Senior Football Championship after a 0-17 to 0-14 win against Cork in the final. It was Tipperary's first Munster title in 85 years.

== Honours ==
Tipperary

- Munster Senior Football Championship (1): 2020
- National Football League Division 3 (1): 2017
- Munster Under 21 Football Championship: 2015
