= Paudie Feehan =

Irish hurler and footballer

Personal information
- Born: County Tipperary, Ireland

Sport
- Sport: Hurling
- Position: Half-back
Club
- Years: Club
- Killenaule
Inter-county
- Years: County
- 2018 -: Tipperary
Inter-county titles
- Munster titles: 1

Paudie Feehan is an Irish hurler and footballer who plays as a forward for the Tipperary senior team. He plays his club hurling with Killenaule.

== Career ==
Feehan made his senior debut for the Tipperary hurling team on 3 February 2018 in the second round of the 2018 National Hurling League against Waterford. He came into the team a few minutes before the start due to Cathal Barrett picking up a groin injury.

On 22 November 2020, Feehan was a substitute as Tipperary won the 2020 Munster Senior Football Championship after a 0–17 to 0–14 win against Cork in the final. It was Tipperary's first Munster title in 85 years.

== Honours ==
- All-Ireland Under-21 Hurling Championship (1): 2018
- Munster Senior Football Championship (1): 2020
