= Alistair Campbell =

Alistair or Alastair Campbell may refer to:

- Alastair Campbell (athlete) (1890–1943), English cricketer and footballer
- Alistair Campbell (academic) (1907–1974), British Anglo-Saxon scholar
- Alistair Te Ariki Campbell (1925–2009), New Zealand writer
- Alastair Campbell (bioethicist) (born 1938), British theologian and bioethicist
- Alastair Campbell, Lord Bracadale (born 1949), Scottish jurist
- Alastair Campbell, 4th Baron Colgrain (born 1951), British hereditary peer
- Alastair Campbell (born 1957), British journalist and political strategist
- Ali Campbell (Alistair Ian Campbell; born 1959), British singer in UB40
- Alistair Campbell (cricketer) (born 1972), Zimbabwean test cricketer

== See also ==
- Alister Campbell (disambiguation)
