= Philip Austin (Gaelic footballer) =

Irish Gaelic football player

Personal information
- Native name: Pilib Mac Aibhistín (Irish)
- Born: 18 December 1986 (age 39)

Sport
- Sport: Gaelic Football
- Position: Corner Forward
Club
- Years: Club
- 2003-: Borrisokane
Club titles
- Tipperary titles: 1
Inter-county
Years	County	Apps (scores)
2006-2020	Tipperary	32 (3-26)
Inter-county titles
- Munster titles: 1

Philip Austin (born 18 December 1986) is an Irish Gaelic football player who previously played at inter-county level for Tipperary. He plays his club football for Borrisokane.

== Career ==
Austin played minor football for Tipperary in 2004, and under-21 football in 2006 and 2007. He made his championship debut in 2006 against Kerry. On 31 July 2016, Austin started at corner-forward as Tipperary defeated Galway in the 2016 All-Ireland Quarter-finals at Croke Park to reach their first All-Ireland semi-final since 1935. On 21 August 2016, Tipperary were beaten in the semi-final by Mayo on a 2-13 to 0-14 scoreline.

On 22 November 2020, Tipperary won the 2020 Munster Senior Football Championship after a 0-17 to 0-14 win against Cork in the final. It was Tipperary's first Munster title in 85 years.

In April 2021, Austin announced his retirement from inter-county football after 15 years. At the time of his retirement he was the longest serving member of the Tipperary panel. He was also one of the longest serving inter-county footballers.

== Honours ==
Thomas MacDonagh's

- Tipperary Senior Football Championship (1): 2011

Tipperary

- National Football League Promotion Division 4: 2008
- National Football League Division 3 Winners: 2009, 2017
- National Football League Division 4 Winners: 2014
- Munster Under-21 Hurling Championship (1): 2006
- Munster Senior Football Championship (1): 2020
