= Liam Casey =

Irish Gaelic footballer

Personal information
- Native name: Liam Ó Cathasaigh (Irish)
- Born: 1995 (age 30–31) Cahir, County Tipperary, Ireland
- Occupation: Student

Sport
- Sport: Gaelic football
- Position: Centre-forward
Club
- Years: Club
- Cahir
Club titles
- Tipperary titles: 0
College
- Years: College
- University College Dublin
Inter-county*
Years	County	Apps (scores)
2015-	Tipperary	4 (0-00)
Inter-county titles
- Munster titles: 1
- All-Irelands: 0
- NFL: 0
- All Stars: 0
- *Inter County team apps and scores correct as of 18:44, 1 August 2015.

Liam Casey (born 1995) is an Irish Gaelic footballer who plays as a centre-forward for the Tipperary senior team.

Born in Cahir, County Tipperary, Casey first played competitive Gaelic football during his schooling at Rockwell College. He arrived on the inter-county scene at the age of seventeen when he first linked up with the Tipperary minor team before later joining the under-21 side. He made his senior debut during the 2015 championship. Casey immediately became a regular member of the starting fifteen.

At club level Casey plays with Cahir

On 22 November 2020, Tipperary won the 2020 Munster Senior Football Championship after a 0-17 to 0-14 win against Cork in the final. It was Tipperary's first Munster title in 85 years.

== Honours ==
=== Player ===
Tipperary

- Munster Under-21 Football Championship (1): 2015
- National Football League Division 3 (1): 2017
- Munster Senior Football Championship (1): 2020
