= 2020 All-Ireland Senior Football Championship =

Championship details
- Dates: 31 October 2020 – 19 December 2020
- Teams: 31

All-Ireland Champions
- Winning team: Dublin (30th win)
- Captain: Stephen Cluxton
- Manager: Dessie Farrell

All-Ireland Finalists
- Losing team: Mayo
- Captain: Aidan O'Shea
- Manager: James Horan

Provincial Champions
- Munster: Tipperary
- Leinster: Dublin
- Ulster: Cavan
- Connacht: Mayo

Championship statistics
- No. matches played: 29
- Goals total: 59 (2.03 per game)
- Points total: 803 (27.68 per game)
- Top Scorer: Cillian O'Connor (5–40)
- Player of the Year: Brian Fenton

The 2020 All-Ireland Senior Football Championship (SFC) was the 134th edition of the Gaelic Athletic Association's premier inter-county Gaelic football tournament since its establishment in 1887.

The public health measures introduced to combat the COVID-19 pandemic resulted in the competition being delayed. On 17 March, the GAA confirmed that the opening fixture – due to have taken place at Gaelic Park in The Bronx on 3 May – had been postponed. In June, the GAA announced that the 2020 championship would be straight knock-out, the first straight-knockout since 2000.

Thirty teams took part – thirty of the thirty-two counties of Ireland. New York, initially scheduled to host Galway decided on 26 June not reschedule the match, and were unable to participate due to travel restrictions resulting from the COVID-19 pandemic. London, initially scheduled to host Roscommon at Ruislip at the beginning of May, were also eliminated from the 2020 All-Ireland SFC after a meeting of the GAA's Ard Chomhairle on 12 September 2020. Sligo later withdrew due to a COVID-19 outbreak from 3 November.

London were initially scheduled to host Roscommon at Ruislip at the beginning of May, before all GAA activity was postponed due to the COVID-19 pandemic. Roscommon were then set to play their rescheduled Connacht football quarter-final on the weekend of 31 October, with the winner facing Mayo or Leitrim the following weekend. Roscommon advanced directly into the semi-final.

The Galway v Sligo Connacht SFC semi-final was not played as Sligo was overcome by the COVID-19 virus and did not have anyone left to field a team. Thus Galway's first match was the Connacht SFC final. This also left the Connacht SFC with only four teams instead of the usual seven. This previously only happened during the period when all Connacht SFC finals were between Galway and Mayo (1933–1940) again in 1965 the match was rescheduled for the 2023 season.

Both the London and New York games were rescheduled for the 2025 All-Ireland Senior Football Championship.

It emerged that, in order for London's quarter-final to have taken place, their entire panel and backroom team would have had to self-isolate in Ireland for two weeks prior to the match. Kilkenny, as in previous years, did not enter.

In 2020 the GAA planned to introduce the Tailteann Cup, a competition for Division 3 and 4 National Football League teams who did not qualify for their provincial finals or achieve promotion to Division 2 of the league. The Tailteann Cup was cancelled as a result of the impact of the COVID-19 pandemic on Gaelic games and was rescheduled for introduction in 2021, when its introduction was again postponed.

Dublin, the defending champion, completed an unprecedented six-in-a-row.

== Format ==
=== Provincial Championships format ===
Connacht, Leinster, Munster and Ulster each organise a provincial championship. Most of the teams who lost a match in their provincial championship entered the All-Ireland qualifiers in the years prior to 2020 – New York did not enter the qualifiers. As the championship was delayed due to the impact of the COVID-19 pandemic, the qualifiers were abandoned with all matches being changed to straight knock-out.

If the score is level at the end of the normal seventy minutes, two periods of ten minutes each way are played. If the score is still level the tie is decided by a penalty shoot-out.

=== All-Ireland format ===
The four provincial champions compete in the semi-finals. If the score is level at the end of the normal seventy minutes in a semi-final, two periods of ten minutes each way are played. If the score is still level the semi-final is replayed. If the score is level at the end of the normal seventy minutes in the final, the match is replayed.

== Rule changes from 2019 competition ==
Advanced Mark

Initially trialled in the 2019 Leagues, the advanced mark rule was introduced in 2020. The possibility of an advanced mark occurs when a player catches a ball cleanly on or inside a 45m line from a kick in play delivered by an attacking player on or beyond the opposition's 45m line that travels at least 20m and without touching the ground. The player who catches the ball, either an attacker or defender, can signal his intent to stop and take the free-kick resulting from the mark by raising an arm or play on immediately.

Sin-bin

A player who commits a black card offence is sent off the pitch to the sin-bin for ten minutes. Teams are not permitted to replace the player while he is in the sin-bin. If a player receives a black card and has received a black or yellow card previously he is also given a red card.

Kick-out

Goalkeepers must take their kick-out from the 20 metre line (previously kick-outs were taken from the 13 metre line). The ball must be kicked forward and all players must be 13 metres from the ball until it has been kicked.

Following a motion proposed by Kildare at the GAA Congress on 28 September 2020, the kick-out rule was further modified so that an outfield player receiving a ball direct from the kick-out cannot play the ball back to their goalkeeper. Unusually, the "no back-pass" modification was not trialled before its introduction in the 2020 senior championship.

== Provincial championships ==
=== Connacht Senior Football Championship ===
Quarter-finals
Mayo	2-15
Leitrim	0-10

Semi-finals
Galway	w/o
Sligo	conc
Roscommon	0-13
Mayo	1-16

Final
Galway	0-13
Mayo	0-14

RTÉ

15 November 2020
13:30 GMT (UTC+0)
Connacht Final

Report

Galway	0–13 (13) – (14) 0–14	Mayo
(HT: 0-05 – 0-08)
Pts: S Walsh 7 (4f), P Conroy 3, D Conneely 1, P Kelly 1, G O’Donnell 1.		Pts: C O’Connor 4 (2f), T Conroy 3, M Ruane 2, B Walsh 2, P Durcan 1, D O’Connor 1, R O’Donoghue 1.

Pearse Stadium, Galway
Referee: Sean Hurson (Tyrone)
Attendance: 0 (Note: The game was played behind closed doors due to the impact of the COVID-19 pandemic on Gaelic games.)

=== Leinster Senior Football Championship ===
Preliminary round
Carlow	0-20
Offaly	3-14
Wexford	0-11
Wicklow	2-09
Louth	1-07
Longford	1-09

Quarter-finals
Offaly	0-16
Kildare	0-20
Wicklow	0-07
Meath	7-14
Longford	1-14
Laois	1-16
Westmeath	0-11
Dublin	0-22

Semi-finals
Kildare	0-15
Meath	5-09
Laois	0-07
Dublin	2-23

Final
Meath	0-09
Dublin	3-21

RTÉ

21 November 2020
19:00 GMT (UTC+0)
Leinster Final

Report

Meath	0–09 (9) – (30) 3–21	Dublin
(HT: 0-02 – 2–12)
Pts: J Morris 4 (1f); B Menton 1, C O'Sullivan 1, J Scully 1; T O'Reilly 1 (f); J Wallace 1 (m).		Gls: D Rock 1, S Bugler 1, N Scully 1. Pts: D Rock 7 (5f, 1 '45'); C Kilkenny 4; P Small 3 (2m); C O'Callaghan 2; S Bugler 2, J Small 1; P Mannion 1 (f), N Scully 1.

Croke Park, Dublin
Referee: Derek O'Mahoney (Tipperary)
Attendance: 0

=== Munster Senior Football Championship ===
The two teams who won the semi-finals in the previous year are given byes to this year's semi-finals.

Quarter-finals
Waterford	0-9
Limerick	2-14
Tipperary	2-11
Clare	1-11

Semi-finals
Limerick	2-11
Tipperary	1-15
Cork	1-12
Kerry	0-13

Final
Tipperary	0-17
Cork	0-14

RTÉ

22 November 2020
13:30 GMT (UTC+0)
Munster Final

Report

Tipperary	0–17 (17) – (14) 0–14	Cork
(HT: 0–11 – 0-07)
Pts: C Sweeney 7 (2fs, 2m); M Quinlivan 5 (1f); L Casey 2 (f); K Fahey 1, E Comerford 1 (free), P Austin 1.		Pts: L Connolly 4 (2fs, 1 45), M Collins 4 (4fs); J O’Rourke 2; C O’Callaghan 1, B Hurley 1, S White 1, C O’Mahony 1 (f).

Páirc Uí Chaoimh, Cork
Referee: Maurice Deegan (Laois)

=== Ulster Senior Football Championship ===
An un-seeded draw determined the fixtures for all nine teams. In April 2018, the Ulster GAA Competitions Control Committee introduced a rule that the two teams playing in the preliminary round would be exempt from playing in the preliminary round in the following two years. As a result of the draw for 2020, Cavan and Monaghan were awarded byes to the quarter-finals in 2021 and 2022.

Preliminary round
Monaghan	1–17
Cavan	2–15

Quarter-finals
Donegal	1–13
Tyrone	1–11
Derry	0–15
Armagh	0–17
Fermanagh	0–11
Down	1–15
Antrim	0–9
Cavan	0–13

Semi-finals
Donegal	1–22
Armagh	0–13
Down	1–13
Cavan	1–14

Final
Donegal	0–12
Cavan	1–13

RTÉ
BBC NI

22 November 2020
16:00 GMT (UTC+0)
Ulster Final

Report

Donegal	0–12 (12) – (16) 1–13	Cavan
(HT: 0-09 – 0-07)
Pts: P McBrearty 4 (2f), N O’Donnell, C McGonigle 2, R McHugh 1, P Mogan 1, M Langan 1, M Murphy 1.		Gls: C Madden 1. Pts: C Madden 2, J Smith 2, O Kiernan 2, G McKiernan 2 (2f), J McLoughlin 1, G Smith 1, C Brady 1, T Galligan 1, M Reilly 1.

Athletic Grounds, Armagh
Referee: Barry Cassidy (Derry)
Attendance: 0

== All-Ireland Series ==
Semi-finals
Dublin	1–24
Cavan	0–12
Mayo	5–20
Tipperary	3–13

Final
Dublin	2–14
Mayo	0–15

=== Semi-finals ===
RTÉ
Sky Sports

5 December 2020
17:30 GMT (UTC+0)
Semi-final

Report

Dublin	1–24 (27) – (12) 0–12	Cavan
(HT: 0–12 – 0-07)
Gls: R McDaid 1 Pts: D Rock 6 (2f); C Kilkenny 4 (1m), C O’Callaghan 4, B Fenton 4; R McDaid 2, P Small 2 (1f); B Howard 1, C Costello 1.		Pts: M Reilly 3; O Kiernan 2; J Smith 1, R Galligan 1, C Brady 1, G McKiernan 1 (f), C Conroy 1 (f), C Madden 1, J Smith 1.

Croke Park, Dublin
Referee: Ciaran Branagan (Down)
Attendance: 0

RTÉ
Sky Sports

6 December 2020
15:30 GMT (UTC+0)
Semi-final

Report

Mayo	5–20 (35) – (22) 3–13	Tipperary
(HT: 4–12 – 1-05)
Gls: C O'Connor 4, D O'Connor 1. Pts: C O’Connor 9 (6fs); T Conroy 4 (1m); D Coen 2; M Ruane 1, P Durcan 1, K McLoughlin 1, A O’Shea 1, C Loftus 1.		Gls: C Sweeney 1, B Fox 1, P Feehan 1. Pts: C Sweeney 9 (8fs); C O’Riordan 2; S O’Brien 1, K Fahey 1.

Croke Park, Dublin
Referee: David Gough (Meath)
Attendance: 0

=== Final ===
RTÉ
Sky Sports

19 December 2020
17:00 GMT (UTC+0)
Final

Report

Dublin	2–14 (20) – (15) 0–15	Mayo
(HT: 2-06 – 0–10)
Gls: D Rock 1, C O'Callaghan 1. Pts: D Rock 4 (fs); C Kilkenny 3; C O'Callaghan 1, S Bugler 1, P Small 1, N Scully 1, B Fenton 1, P Mannion 1 (f), B Howard 1.		Pts: C O’Connor 9 (5fs, 2ms); R O’Donoghue 2; O Mullen 1, C Loftus 1, S Coen 1 (m), D Coen 1.

Croke Park, Dublin
Referee: David Coldrick (Meath)
Attendance: 0

== Stadia and locations ==
Locations of stadia used during the championship

Stadia
County	Location	Stadium	Capacity
Cavan	Cavan	Breffni Park	32,000
Cork	Cork	Páirc Uí Chaoimh	45,000
Derry	Derry	Celtic Park	22,000
Donegal	Ballybofey	MacCumhaill Park	18,000
Fermanagh	Enniskillen	Brewster Park	20,000
Dublin	Drumcondra	Croke Park	82,300
Galway	Galway	Pearse Stadium	26,197
Laois	Portlaoise	O'Moore Park	27,000
Leitrim	Carrick-on-Shannon	Páirc Seán Mac Diarmada	9,331
Monaghan	Clones	St Tiernach's Park	36,000
Offaly	Tullamore	O'Connor Park	20,000
Roscommon	Roscommon	Dr Hyde Park	25,000
Tipperary	Thurles	Semple Stadium	45,690
Waterford	Dungarvan	Fraher Field	15,000
Westmeath	Mullingar	Cusack Park	11,000
Wexford	Wexford	Wexford Park	20,000

== Referees panel ==
Championship Panel
Name	County	Club	Matches refereed
BRANAGAN, Ciaran	Down		
CASSIDY, Barry	Derry	Bellaghy	
CAWLEY, Brendan	Kildare		
COLDRICK, David	Meath	Blackhall Gaels	
DEEGAN, Maurice	Laois		
FALOON, Paul	Down		
GOUGH, David	Meath	Slane	
HENRY, Jerome	Mayo		
HURSON, Sean	Tyrone		
KELLY, Fergal	Longford		
LANE, Conor	Cork		
MCNALLY, Martin	Monaghan		
MCQUILLAN, Joe	Cavan		
O'MAHONEY, Derek	Tipperary		

== Statistics ==
- All scores correct as of 7 December 2020

=== Top scorer: overall ===
Rank	Player	County	Tally	Total	Matches	Average
1	Cillian O'Connor	Mayo	5–40	55	5	11.0
2	Conor Sweeney	Tipperary	2–27	33	4	8.2
3	Dean Rock	Dublin	1–26	29	5	5.8
4	Ciarán Kilkenny	Dublin	1–20	23	5	4.6
5	Jordan Morris	Meath	4-09	21	3	7
6	Gearóid McKiernan	Cavan	0–12	12	5	2.4
6	Con O'Callaghan	Dublin	1-09	12	5	2.4
8	Rian O'Neill	Armagh	0–11	11	2	5.5
8	Cian Farrell	Offaly	0–11	11	2	5.5
8	Donal O'Hare	Down	1-08	11	2	5.5
8	Tommy Conroy	Mayo	1-08	11	5	2.2
8	Martin Reilly	Cavan	2-05	11	5	2.2
8	Seán Bugler	Dublin	2-05	11	5	2.2
14	Gary Walsh	Laois	0–10	10	2	5
14	Sam Mulroy	Louth	1-07	10	1	10

=== Top scorer: single game ===
Rank	Player	County	Tally	Total	Opposition
1	Cillian O'Connor	Mayo	4-09	21	Tipperary
2	Jordan Morris	Meath	3-04	13	Wicklow
3	Cillian O'Connor	Mayo	1-09	12	Leitrim
3	Conor Sweeney	Tipperary	1-09	12	Mayo
5	Dean Rock	Dublin	1-07	10	Meath
5	Sam Mulroy	Louth	1-07	10	Longford
7	Cillian O'Connor	Mayo	0-09	9	Roscommon
7	Cillian O'Connor	Mayo	0-09	9	Dublin
9	Paul Broderick	Carlow	0-08	8	Offaly
9	Gary Walsh	Laois	0-08	8	Longford

=== Scoring events ===
- Widest winning margin: 28
  - Wicklow 0-07 – 7–14 Meath (Leinster SFC)
- Most goals in a match: 8
  - Mayo 5–20 – 3–13 Tipperary (All-Ireland SFC semi-final)
- Most points in a match: 36
  - Dublin 1–24 – 0–12 Cavan (All-Ireland SFC semi-final)
  - Offaly 0–16 – 0–20 Kildare (Leinster SFC)
- Most goals by one team in a match: 7
  - Wicklow 0-07 – 7–14 Meath (Leinster SFC)
- Highest aggregate score: 57 points
  - Mayo 5–20 – 3–13 Tipperary (All-Ireland SFC semi-final)
- Lowest aggregate score: 22 points
  - Cavan 0–13 – 0-09 Antrim (Ulster SFC)
  - Louth 1-07 – 1-09 Longford (Leinster SFC)

=== Miscellaneous ===
- Due to the impact of the COVID-19 pandemic on Gaelic games, the All-Ireland Qualifiers and Super 8 Games were not played.
- Sligo, London and New York withdrew from Connacht championship, meaning that only four teams competed for the first since 1952.
  - Due to rotation both London and New York fixtures were rescheduled for the 2025 season.
- Kerry lost their only championship match, making it their first championship without a win since 1993. They had reached the quarter-final stage every year since its introduction in 2001.
- Tipperary vs Clare first meeting in the Munster Championship since 2002.
- Dublin set a new record by becoming the first team to win six successive All-Irelands, and were also the first to win ten successive Leinster Championship titles.
- The Athletic Grounds, Armagh hosted the Ulster final for the first time since 1941.
- Mayo also set a record: ten final defeats in a row (1989, 1996, 1997, 2004, 2006, 2012, 2013, 2016, 2017, 2020).
- Tipperary won their first Munster Championship title since 1935.
- Cavan won their first Ulster Championship title and reached the All-Ireland semi-final for the first time since 1997.
- The four provincial winners were exactly the same as the four provincial winners from 100 years earlier in 1920. Cavan also playing Dublin and Mayo also playing Tipperary, confirmed on the weekend of the centenary of Bloody Sunday due to the delay caused by the COVID-19 pandemic.
- Cillian O'Connor's four goals (accompanied by nine points) in the 2020 All-Ireland SFC semi-final at Croke Park broke the 5–3 record set by Johnny Joyce of Dublin in 1960 and matched with 3–9 by Rory Gallagher of Fermanagh in 2002 for the highest individual scorer in any championship football match.
- Dublin also scored the fastest goal in the history of the All Ireland final when Dean Rock netted after just 12 seconds.
- Dublin played five championship games en route to their All Ireland success without conceding a goal in all five matches, another impressive record.
- Dublin extended their record-breaking unbeaten streak to 42 consecutive championship games, as of 25 December 2020. This amounts to 39 wins, 3 draws and 0 losses.
- It was Dublin's first All Ireland championship win in a year ending in 0 and completed the set for them. They became the first football county since Kerry (1978) to do so.
- Mayo & Tipperary equal the record for the number of goals (8) in an All Ireland semi-final (1980 Kerry v Offaly).

== Awards ==
All Star Team of the Year

Pos.	Player	Team	Appearances
GK	Raymond Galligan	Cavan	1
RCB	Oisín Mullin	Mayo	1
FB	Padraig Faulkner	Cavan	1
LCB	Michael Fitzsimons	Dublin	3
RWB	James McCarthy	Dublin	4
CB	John Small	Dublin	1
LWB	Eoin Murchan	Dublin	1
MD	Brian Fenton^{FOTY}	Dublin	5
MD	Thomas Galligan	Cavan	1
RWF	Niall Scully	Dublin	1
CF	Ciarán Kilkenny	Dublin	4
LWF	Con O'Callaghan	Dublin	3
RCF	Cillian O'Connor	Mayo	2
FF	Conor Sweeney	Tipperary	1
LCF	Dean Rock	Dublin	3

Player has previously been selected.

County breakdown

- Dublin = 9
- Cavan = 3
- Mayo = 2
- Tipperary = 1
