= Robbie Kiely =

Irish Gaelic footballer

Personal information
- Born: 16 December 1990 (age 35)

Sport
- Sport: Gaelic Football
- Position: Half back
Club
- Years: Club
- 2007-201?: Barryroe GAA Carbery Rangers GAA
Inter-county
Years	County	Apps (scores)
2011-2023	Tipperary	20 (1-03)
Inter-county titles
- Munster titles: 1

Robbie Kiely (born 16 December 1990) is an Irish Gaelic football player who plays his club football for Barryroe GAA in Cork and previously at inter-county level for Tipperary.

== Career ==
Kiely made his championship debut for Tipperary in 2011 against Louth On 31 July 2016, he started in the half back line as Tipperary defeated Galway in the 2016 All-Ireland Quarter-finals at Croke Park to reach their first All-Ireland semi-final since 1935.

On 21 August 2016, Tipperary were beaten in the semi-final by Mayo on a 2–13 to 0–14 scoreline, with Kiely receiving a black card in the first ten minutes of the match for a pull on the jersey of Jason Doherty which the referee David Coldrick deemed as a cynical foul. Former players including Jim McGuinness and Peter Canavan have said that the black card was a wrong decision by the referee.

On 22 November 2020, Tipperary won the 2020 Munster Senior Football Championship after a 0–17 to 0–14 win against Cork in the final. It was Tipperary's first Munster title in 85 years.

In May 2021, Kiely was ruled out for the entirety of the delayed 2021 season after sustaining a grade three C hamstring tear and tendon damage.

In January 2023, Kiely announced his retirement form inter-county football after 11 years.

== Honours ==
Tipperary

- Munster Under-21 Football Championship (1): 2010
- National Football League Division 3 (1): 2017
- Munster Senior Football Championship (1): 2020
- West Cork Junior Football League Division 3B (1): 2021
- West Cork Junior A championship (2023)
