= COVID-19 pandemic in Ireland =

COVID-19 pandemic in Ireland may refer to:

- COVID-19 pandemic in the Republic of Ireland, the sovereign state
- COVID-19 pandemic in Northern Ireland, a country of the United Kingdom
