= Bill Maher (hurler) =

Irish sportsperson (born 1994)

Personal information
- Born: 21 January 1994 (age 32)

Sport
- Position: Midfield
Club
- Years: Club
- Kilsheelan–Kilcash
Inter-county
Years	County	Apps (scores)
2015–	Tipperary	1 (0-0)
Inter-county titles
- Munster titles: 1

Bill Maher (born 21 January 1994) is an Irish sportsperson. He plays hurling and Gaelic football with his local club Kilsheelan–Kilcash and with the Tipperary senior inter-county team since 2015 and Tipperary senior football team since 2016. Bill made the move to New York in late 2021 and joined up with the Brooklyn Shamrocks GFC club playing under the guidance of Tommy McConvey.

== Career ==
Maher captained Tipperary to win the 2012 All-Ireland Minor Hurling Championship, defeating Dublin in the final on a 2–18 to 1–11 scoreline. He made his championship debut for the Tipperary hurlers on 21 June 2015 against Limerick in the 2015 Munster Senior Hurling Championship. He was also named in the Tipperary squad for the 2016 National Hurling League.

Maher made his championship debut for the Tipperary footballers in 2016 against Waterford. On 31 July 2016, he started in the half-back line as Tipperary defeated Galway in the 2016 All-Ireland Quarter-finals at Croke Park to reach their first All-Ireland semi-final since 1935. On 21 August 2016, Tipperary were beaten in the semi-final by Mayo on a 2–13 to 0–14 scoreline, with Maher being sent-off in the second half.

On 22 November 2020, Tipperary won the 2020 Munster Senior Football Championship after a 0–17 to 0–14 win against Cork in the final. It was Tipperary's first Munster title in 85 years.

In January 2021, Maher was nominated for an All-Star award.

== Honours ==
Tipperary

- Munster Senior Hurling Championship (1): 2015
- All-Ireland Minor Hurling Championship (1): 2012
- Munster Minor Hurling Championship (1): 2012
- All-Ireland Minor Football Championship (1): 2011
- Munster Minor Football Championship (1): 2011
- Munster Under-21 Football Championship (1): 2015
- Munster Senior Football Championship (1): 2020
- National Football League Division 3 (1): 2017
