= Alan Campbell (writer) =

Scottish fantasy novelist

Alan Campbell (born 7 July 1971) is a Scottish fantasy novelist.

== Biography ==
Campbell was born and raised in Falkirk, Scotland. He studied computer science at the University of Edinburgh. After graduating, he worked as a software engineer for DMA Design, Visual Sciences, and Rockstar North, developing the video games Body Harvest (for the Nintendo 64), Formula One 2000 (PlayStation), and the Grand Theft Auto series (PC, PlayStation 2). Following the completion of Grand Theft Auto: Vice City, he left to pursue a career in photography and writing.

Campbell's debut novel was Scar Night, the first of the Deepgate Codex trilogy, followed by Iron Angel in 2008, and God of Clocks in 2009. The novella Lye Street is a prequel to the series.

In 2013, Campbell was awarded an Inkpot Award.

== Bibliography ==
=== Deepgate Codex series ===
- Scar Night (2006)
- Iron Angel (2008)
- God of Clocks (2009)

=== Gravedigger Chronicles ===
- Sea of Ghosts (2011)
- Art of Hunting (2013)
