= Alan Campbell (Gaelic footballer) =

Irish Gaelic football player

Personal information
- Born: 9 October 1991 (age 35)
- Height: 6’2”

Sport
- Sport: Gaelic Football
- Position: Full Back
Club
- Years: Club
- 2008-present: Moyle Rovers
Inter-county
Years	County	Apps (scores)
2012-present	Tipperary	21 (0-01)
Inter-county titles
- Munster titles: 1

Alan Campbell (born 9 October 1991) is an Irish Gaelic football player who plays at inter-county level for Tipperary, and plays his club football for Moyle Rovers.

== Career ==
He played under-21 football for Tipperary in 2012. Campbell made his championship debut for Tipperary in 2012 against Kerry On 31 July 2016, he started at full-back as Tipperary defeated Galway in the 2016 All-Ireland Quarter-finals at Croke Park to reach their first All-Ireland semi-final since 1935. On 21 August 2016, Tipperary were beaten in the semi-final by Mayo on a 2-13 to 0-14 scoreline.

On 22 November 2020, Tipperary won the 2020 Munster Senior Football Championship after a 0-17 to 0-14 win against Cork in the final. It was Tipperary's first Munster title in 85 years.

Tipperary

- National Football League Division 3 (1): 2017
- National Football League Division 4 (1): 2014
- Munster Senior Football Championship (1): 2020
