= Conor Sweeney =

Irish Gaelic footballer

Personal information
- Born: 29 March 1990 (age 36)

Sport
- Sport: Gaelic Football
- Position: Full Forward
Club
- Years: Club
- 2007–: Ballyporeen
Inter-county*
| Years | County | Apps (scores) |
| 2010–2024 | Tipperary | 33 (14-107) |
Inter-county titles
- Munster titles: 1
- All Stars: 1
- *Inter County team apps and scores correct as of match played 30 April 2022.

Conor Sweeney (born 29 March 1990) is a Gaelic football player who previously played at inter-county level for Tipperary, and plays his club football for Ballyporeen in South Tipperary. He also plays club hurling for Skeheenarinky.

== Career ==
Sweeney played minor football for Tipperary in 2007 and 2008, and under-21 football from 2009 to 2011, winning the Munster Under-21 Football Championship in 2010. He made his senior debut for Tipperary in 2010 in the McGrath Cup against UL and his league debut in 2010 against Laois. He made his championship debut in 2010 also against Laois. On 31 July 2016, Sweeney scored 2-2 as Tipperary defeated Galway in the 2016 All-Ireland Quarter-finals at Croke Park to reach their first All-Ireland semi-final since 1935. On 21 August 2016, Tipperary were beaten in the semi-final by Mayo on a 2-13 to 0-14 scoreline. Sweeney ended the 2016 Championship with a scoring total of 3-9.

In October 2017, Sweeney was named in the Ireland squad for the 2017 International Rules Series against Australia in November.

In November 2020, Sweeney scored 1-04 (1-02 from play) as Tipperary won against Clare in the Munster Senior Football Championship Quarter-final. In the semi-final against Limerick, Sweeney was top scorer for Tipperary with his tally of 0-07 (0-05 from frees) helping his team to a 1-15 to 2-11 win after extra time. In the 2020 Munster Final Sweeney, who produced a man of the match display scoring 0-07 (0-05 from play), inspired Tipperary to a 0-17 to 0-14 victory over Cork. Sweeney captained the Tipperary team which ended the Premier county's 85 year wait for a Munster Senior Football Championship title

In the 2020 All-Ireland semi-final on 6 December, Tipperary again faced Mayo. In foggy conditions and losing by 16 points at half-time they eventually lost the game by 5-20 to 3-13.

In January 2021, Sweeney was again nominated for an All-Star award after previously being nominated in 2016.

On 19 February 2021, he was named at full-forward on the All-Star team for 2020, becoming the third ever Tipperary footballer to win an All-Star award.

In January 2023, Sweeney suffered a cruciate ligament rupture in the opening round of the 2023 National Football League against Down and missed the rest of the season before returning in 2024.

In October 2024, Sweeney announced his retirement from inter-county football after 15 years.

== Career statistics ==
As of match played 30 April 2022

| Year | National League | | | Munster | | All-Ireland | | Total | |
| Year | Division | Apps | Score | Apps | Score | Apps | Score | Apps | Score |
|---|---|---|---|---|---|---|---|---|---|
| 2010 | Division 2 | 4 | 0-12 | - | | 2 | 0-03 | 6 | 0-15 |
| 2011 | Division 3 | 5 | 0-09 | 1 | 0-2 | - | | 6 | 0-11 |
| 2012 | Division 3 | 5 | 0-00 | - | | 1 | 0-00 | 6 | 0-00 |
| 2013 | Division 4 | 7 | 1-08 | 1 | 0-03 | 1 | 0-05 | 9 | 1-16 |
| 2014 | Division 4 | 8 | 6-49 | 2 | 1-05 | 3 | 3-14 | 13 | 10-68 |
| 2015 | Division 3 | 7 | 2-29 | 2 | 0-05 | 2 | 1-02 | 11 | 3-36 |
| 2016 | Division 3 | 7 | 1-20 | 2 | 1-00 | 3 | 2-10 | 12 | 4-30 |
| 2017 | Division 3 | 8 | 4-38 | 1 | 1-05 | 2 | 1-08 | 11 | 6-51 |
| 2018 | Division 2 | 6 | 3-31 | 1 | 0-00 | 1 | 0-02 | 8 | 3-33 |
| 2019 | Division 2 | 7 | 2-30 | 1 | 0-04 | 1 | 0-04 | 9 | 2-38 |
| 2020 | Division 3 | 7 | 1-23 | 3 | 1-18 | 1 | 1-09 | 11 | 3-50 |
| 2021 | Division 3 | 4 | 2-13 | 1 | 1-04 | - | | 5 | 3-17 |
| 2022 | Division 4 | 8 | 4-32 | 1 | 1-04 | | | 9 | 5-36 |
| Total | | 83 | 26-294 | 16 | 6-50 | 17 | 8-57 | 116 | 40-401 |

== Honours ==
Ballyporeen

- Tipperary Intermediate Football Championship (1): 2013
- South Tipperary Intermediate Football Championship (1): 2013

Skeheenarinky

- Tipperary Junior A Hurling Championship (2): 2014, 2021

Tipperary

- Munster Under-21 Football Championship (1): 2010
- National Football League Division 3 (1): 2017
- Munster Senior Football Championship (1): 2020 (c)

Individual

- All Star Award (1): 2020
