= Maurice Deegan =

Gaelic football referee

Maurice Deegan (born 1972) is a former inter-county referee from County Laois. A member of the Stradbally club, he refereed three finals of the All-Ireland SFC.

== Career ==
Deegan began refereeing when the Stradbally club secretary asked if he would oversee a friendly game. Deegan officiated, wearing jeans and a t-shirt. The club secretary recommended him for training and Deegan began working on local club matches and, later, underage development matches.

Deegan refereed three All-Ireland Senior Football Championship finals at Croke Park — the 2016 All-Ireland final replay between Dublin and Mayo, the 2012 All-Ireland Senior Football Championship final between Donegal and Mayo and the 2008 All-Ireland Senior Football Championship final between Kerry and Tyrone. He refereed his first All-Ireland final when he was 35 years old.

Deegan also refereed the 2020 Munster Senior Football Championship final between Tipperary and Cork which resulted in Tipp's first title since 1935. Cork-based newspaper, the Irish Examiner, reckoned Deegan gave a "solid" performance.

Deegan was originally listed to referee the 2022 Tailteann Cup final, but the GAA confirmed a change of referee on 6 July. Deegan was absent for what would have been his final inter-county game after contracting COVID-19. Barry Cassidy deputised in Deegan's absence.

Deegan refereed the 2022 Leinster Senior Club Football Championship final (contested by The Downs and Kilmacud Crokes), his last game at Croke Park. He fell and injured his shoulder during the second half of the match. He was also involved in another collision, with the weather at fault. Deegan was able to carry on.

After retiring, he rated the 2011 All-Ireland semi-final between Donegal and Dublin as the most difficult game he had refereed.

After retiring from officiating at inter-county level, Deegan joined BBC's coverage of championship games, explaining to viewers decisions made by the on-field referee.

He also became a member of the Football Review Committee. He joined alongside Peter Canavan in January 2025, succeeding previous members Michael Murphy and Malachy O'Rourke when they became unavailable.

== Personal life ==
Deegan as father of two.
