= 2012 All-Ireland Minor Football Championship =

Gaelic football competition

All-Ireland Minor Football Championship 2012
Championship details
- Dates: 1 April – 23 September 2012
- Teams: 34

All-Ireland Champions
- Winning team: Dublin (11th win)

Provincial Champions
- Leinster: Dublin

Championship statistics
- No. matches played: 40
- Goals total: 1
- Points total: 1

The 2012 All-Ireland Minor Football Championship was the premier "knockout" competition for under-18 competitors who play the game of Gaelic football in Ireland. The games were organised by the Gaelic Athletic Association. The 2012 series of games started in April with the majority of the games played during the summer months. The All-Ireland Minor Football Final took place on 23 September in Croke Park, Dublin, preceding the Senior Game, and was won by Dublin.

== Results ==
=== Leinster Minor Football Championship ===
==== Rob Robin ====
2012 Rob Robin	Offaly	8–30 – 1–0	Kilkenny

2012 Rob Robin	Kildare	3–19 – 0–10	Wexford	St Conleth's Park, Newbridge

2012 Rob Robin	Wicklow	2–10 – 2–6	Laois	Aughrim Park, Aughrim

2012 Rob Robin	Louth	2–10 – 0–6	Wexford	Haggardstown

2012 Rob Robin	Meath	1–11 – 0–11	Longford

==== Preliminary round ====
2012 Preliminary round	Wexford	2–12 – 2–12	Carlow
1:35 PM

2012 Preliminary round Replay	Wexford	2–11 – 0–9	Carlow	Dr. Cullen Park, Carlow
1:35 PM

2012 Preliminary round	Longford	2–10 – 1–10	Laois	Pearse Park, Longford
1:35 PM

2012 Preliminary round	Carlow	1–13 – 0–9	Westmeath	Dr. Cullen Park, Carlow
1:35 PM

==== Quarter-finals ====
2012 Quarter-final	Wicklow	0–7 – 0–10	Westmeath	Aughrim Park, Aughrim

2012 Quarter-final	Meath	3–11 – 1–8	Offaly	O'Connor Park, Tullamore

2012 Quarter-final	Kildare	2–16 – 2–8	Louth	St Conleth's Park, Newbridge

==== Semi-finals ====
2012 Semi-final	Dublin	2–14 – 1–5	Longford	Parnell Park, Dublin
1:35 PM

2012 Semi-final	Meath	3–14 – 1–7	Westmeath	Cusack Park, Mullingar
1:35 PM

==== Final ====
22 July 2012 Final	Meath	1–11 – 3–17	Dublin	Croke Park, Dublin
1:35 PM

=== Munster Minor Football Championship ===
==== Rob Robin ====
2012 Rob Robin	Waterford	1–3 – 1–14	Kerry	Fraher Field, Dungarvan

2012 Rob Robin	Limerick	0–5 – 3–9	Kerry	Austin Stack Park, Tralee

==== Quarter-finals ====
2012 Quarter-final	Tipperary	2–9 – 0–8	Kerry	Austin Stack Park, Tralee

2012 Quarter-final	Clare	2–20 – 0–6	Kerry	Cusack Park, Ennis

2012 Quarter-final	Limerick	0–6 – 3–13	Cork	Gaelic Grounds, Limerick

==== Semi-finals ====
2012 Semi-final	Tipperary	1–10 – 0–9	Cork	Páirc Uí Chaoimh, Cork
1:35 PM

2012 Semi-final	Kerry	0–17 – 3–4	Clare	Cusack Park, Ennis
1:35 PM

==== Final ====
8 July 2012 Final	Tipperary	2–14 – 1–14	Kerry	Gaelic Grounds, Limerick
1:35 PM

=== Ulster Minor Football Championship ===
==== Preliminary round ====
2012 Preliminary round	Donegal	1–11 – 0–10	Cavan	Breffni Park, Cavan
1:35 PM

==== Quarter-finals ====
2012 Quarter-final	Monaghan	2-10- 1–2	Antrim	St Tiernach's Park, Clones

2012 Quarter-final	Derry	2–9 – 1–7	Donegal	Healy Park, Omagh

2012 Quarter-final	Down	1-11- 1–8	Fermanagh	Nowlan Park, Kilkenny

2012 Quarter-final	Armagh	0-19- 4–11	Tyrone	Athletic Grounds, Armagh

==== Semi-finals ====
2012 Semi-final	Down	0–8 – 0–11	Monaghan	Athletic Grounds, Armagh
1:35 PM

2012 Semi-final	Tyrone	0–15 – 0–6	Derry	St Tiernach's Park, Clones
1:35 PM

==== Final ====
22 July 2012 Final	Tyrone	0–14 – 1–8	Monaghan	St. Tiernach's Park, Clones
1:35 PM

=== Connacht Minor Football Championship ===
==== Quarter-final ====
2012 Quarter-final	Roscommon	4–15 – 2–3	Leitrim	Páirc Seán Mac Diarmada, Carrick-on-Shannon

==== Semi-finals ====
2012 Semi-final	Sligo	0–6 – 1–6	Mayo	McHale Park, Castlebar
1:35 PM

2012 Semi-final	Galway	1–11 – 1–9	Roscommmon
1:35 PM

==== Final ====
15 July 2012 Final	Mayo	0–10 – 0–8	Roscommon	Dr. Hyde Park, Roscommon
1:35 PM

=== All Ireland Series ===
==== Quarter-finals ====
2012 Quarter-final	Dublin	1–16 – 0–8	Monaghan	Pairc Esler, Newry

2012 Quarter-final	Meath	1–14 – 2–12	Tyrone	Pairc Esler, Newry

2012 Quarter-final	Tipperary	1–8 – 0–19	Mayo	Croke Park, Dublin

2012 Quarter-final	Roscommon	0–11 – 1–9	Kerry	Croke Park, Dublin

==== Semi-finals ====
2012 Semi-final	Meath	2–10 – 1–11	Mayo	Croke Park, Dublin
1:35 PM

2012 Semi-final	Kerry	1–10 – 3–12	Dublin	Croke Park, Dublin
1:35 PM

==== Final ====
23 September 2012 Final	Meath	1–5 – 0–14	Dublin	Croke Park, Dublin
1:35 PM
