= 2011 All-Ireland Minor Football Championship =

Gaelic football competition

All-Ireland Minor Football Championship 2011
Championship details
- Dates: 13 April – 18 September 2011
- Teams: 34

All-Ireland Champions
- Winning team: Tipperary (2nd win)
- Captain: Liam McGrath

All-Ireland Finalists
- Losing team: Dublin

Provincial Champions
- Munster: Tipperary
- Leinster: Dublin
- Ulster: Cavan
- Connacht: Roscommon

Championship statistics
- No. matches played: 40
- Goals total: 104 (2.60 per game)
- Points total: 854 (21.35 per game)
- Top Scorer: C. Kilkenny (Dublin) 0-39 (39)

The 2011 All-Ireland Minor Football Championship (known for sponsorship reasons as the ESB Minor Football Championship) was the premier "knockout" competition for under-18 competitors of the game of Gaelic football played in Ireland. The games were organised by the Gaelic Athletic Association. The 2011 series of games kicked off on the 13 April with the majority of the games played during the summer months. The All-Ireland Minor Football Final took place on the 18 September in Croke Park, Dublin, preceding the All-Ireland Senior Football Final. Tipperary won the competition for the second time and the first time since 1934 after a 3-9 to 1-14 win against Dublin.

== Leinster Minor Football Championship ==
=== First round ===
16 April 2011 Round 1	Kilkenny	0-00 - 7-17	Wexford	Páirc Uí Shíocháin, Gorey
3:00 PM		Irish Independent	A. Nolan 1-06 (2f); C. McCabe 3-00; D. Foley 1-03; B. Kearney 1-02 (1f); Aoidh Doyle 1-01; N. Colfer, B. Hughes, E. O'Byrne, P. O'Leary, J. Tubritt, 0-01 each;	Referee: G. Whelan (Wicklow)

16 April 2011 Round 1	Wicklow	1-09 - 3-07	Offaly	Aughrim County Ground, Aughrim
3:00 PM	A. Conway 0-04 (4f); B. McCrea 0-03 (2f); N. Sweeney 1-00 (1p); P. Murphy, T. Smith (1 '45), 0-01 each		N. Wynne 1-02 (2f); P. Cunningham 0-03; A. McDonagh, B. Grehan, 1-00 each; C. Cahill, B. Norris, 0-01 each	Referee: F. Barry (Kildare)

16 April 2011 Round 1	Louth	1-13 - 1-11	Meath	Haggardstown, Dundalk
3:00 PM	C. Byrne 0-9 (8f); J. Horan 1-0; R. McCabe 0-2 (f, '45'); C. Grimes, P. Reilly 0-1 each	Ógspórt Lú	C. Smith 0-5 (3f); R. Farrelly 1-2; N. Shortall 0-3; P. Harnan 0-1	Referee: B. Hickey (Kildare)

16 April 2011 Round 1	Kildare	1-15 - 0-08	Longford	St. Conleth's Park, Newbridge
3:00 PM	B. Coffey 0-04 (3f, 1 '45); P. Brophy 1-01; N. Kelly 0-03; T. Gibbons (1f), G. Farrell, 0-02 each; F. Conway, D. Hyland, D. King, 0-01 each	Longford Leader	R. Smith 0-04 (3f); J. McGivney 0-02; B. McKeon, D. Mimnagh 0-01 each	Referee: D. Brazil (Offaly)

16 April 2011 Round 1	Dublin	4-15 - 0-8	Westmeath	Parnell Park, Dublin
3:00 PM	S. Fulham 3-01; C. Kilkenny 0-06 (4f); J. McCaffrey 1-01; G. Ivory 0-02; D. Campbell, E. Ó Conghaile, K. Kindlon, E. Lowndes, C. Meaney, 0-01 each	The Dub Hub	D. McCormack 0-03 (3f); A. Coffey 0-02; L. Dolan, G. Leech, D. Whelan, 0-01 each	Referee: F. Kelly (Longford)

16 April 2011 Round 1	Carlow	1-07 - 1-14	Laois	Dr. Cullen Park, Carlow
6:30 PM	C. Blake 0-03 (3f); M. Fitzgerald 1-00; P. Farrell, S. Murphy, D. O'Brien (1f), G. Power, 0-01 each	Carlow Nationalist	P. Kingston 1-05 (0-3f; 1-0p); M. Campion, B. Kenna, 0-02 each; E. Costello, D. Dunne, L. McGovern, P. Murphy, M. Scully, 0-01 each	Referee: D. Maher (Westmeath)

=== Losers Group ===
27 April 2011 Losers Group	Longford	1-10 - 0-07	Westmeath	Pearse Park, Longford
7:00 PM	R. Smyth 1-02 (1-00p; 0-02f); J. McGivney 0-04 (3f); B. McKeon 0-02; C. Clarke, C. Lynn (1f), 0-01 each	Irish Times	K. Daly, L. Dolan, R. Henshaw, G. Leech (1f), D. McCormack, J. Rock, D. Whelan, 0-01	Referee: D. Gough (Meath)

29 April 2011 Losers Group	Carlow	1-03 - 1-17	Meath	Dr. Cullen Park, Carlow
7:15 PM	D. O'Brien 1-01 (1-0 pen); C. Lawlor (1f), R. Jeffers, 0-1 each	Irish Independent	B. McMahon 0-05 (2f); W. McGrath, N. Shortall (1f), 0-03 each; S. McEntee 1-0; A. Forde, B. O'Brien, C. O'Sullivan, R. Farrelly, B. Dardis, C. Finn, 0-01 each	Referee: F. Smith (Offaly)

7 May 2011 Losers Group	Longford	4-14 - 0-04	Wicklow	Pearse Park, Longford
3:00 PM IST	B. McKeon 2-03; R. Smyth 1-02; B. Walsh 1-01; J. McGivney 0-03; C. Clarke, G. Maguire, D. Mimnagh, 0-01 each	Longford Leader	T. Smith 0-02; P. Ellis, M. Healy, 0-01 each	Attendance: c. 300; Referee: N. Hand (Louth)

=== Quarter-finals ===
14 May 2011 Quarter-Final	Meath	1-16 - 0-03	Wexford	Páirc Tailteann, Navan
3:00 PM	B. O'Brien 1-04; B. McMahon 0-04 (3f); C. O'Sullivan, N. Shortall (2f), W. McGrath, 0-02 each; R. Farrelly, A. Forde, 0-01 each	Irish Times	B. Hughes, B. Kearney (1f), A. Nolan, 0-01 each	Referee: D. Maher (Westmeath)

14 May 2011 Quarter-Final	Laois	1-06 - 3-06	Louth	O'Moore Park, Portlaoise
5:15 PM	P. Kingston 1-01; D. Dunne 0-02; S. Attride, A. Farrelly, M. Scully, 0-01 each	Irish Times	C. Grimes 2-00; C. Byrne 0-05; C. McKeever 1-01	Referee: J. Hickey (Carlow)

14 May 2011 Quarter-Final	Longford	0-05 - 0-10	Dublin	Pearse Park, Longford
7:00 PM	R. Smyth 0-03 (2f); J. McGivney (1f), B. McKeon, 0-01 each	Irish Times	G. Ivory 0-05 (2 '45s); C. Kilkenny 0-02 (1f); E. Ó Conghaile, C. Costello, J. McCaffrey, 0-01 each	Referee: F. Smith (Offaly)

14 May 2011 Quarter-Final	Offaly	0-08 - 0-16	Kildare	O'Connor Park, Tullamore
7:00 PM	N. Bracken 0-02; E. Carroll 0-02; P. Cunningham, A. McDonagh, J. O'Connor (1 '45), N. Wynne (1f), 0-01 each	Irish Times	B. Coffey 0-05 (3f); N. Kelly 0-03; P. Brophy, F. Conway, 0-02 each; G. Farrell, D. Hyland, C. Kilkenny, D. King, 0-01 each	Referee: F. Kelly (Longford)

=== Semi-finals ===
29 June 2011 Semi-Final	Meath	0-13 - 0-10	Louth	Páirc Tailteann, Navan
7:30 PM	B. McMahon 0-04; C. O'Sullivan, N. Shortall (3f), C. Smith (1f), 0-03 each	Irish Times	C. Byrne 0-09 (5f); D. Grimes 0-1	Referee: F. Barry (Kildare)

29 June 2011 Semi-Final	Dublin	1-24 - 0-11	Kildare	Parnell Park, Dublin
7:30 PM	C. Kilkenny 0-11 (4f); G. Ivory 0-5 (1 '45); P. Mannion 1-01; C. Costello 0-03; D. Campbell 0-02; S. Fulham, J. McCaffrey, 0-01 each	Irish Times	N. Kelly 0-03 (2f); B. Coffey 0-02; P. Brophy, F. Conway, D. Duke, T. Gibbons, D. Hyland, D. King, 0-01 each	Referee: D. Maher (Westmeath)

=== Final ===
10 July 2011 Final	Meath	1-11 - 2-18	Dublin	Croke Park, Dublin
12:00 PM	W. McGrath 1-01; B. McMahon 0-03 (2f); C. Finn, A. Forde, S. Mattimoe, C. O'Sullivan, N. Shortall (1f), C. Smith, D. Smith, 0-01 each	Irish Times	G. Ivory 0-06 (1 '45); C. Costello, S. Fulham, 1-02 each; C. Kilkenny (1f), P. Mannion, J. McCaffrey, E. Ó Conghaile, 0-02 each;	Referee: F. Kelly (Longford)

== Connacht Minor Football Championship ==
=== Quarter-finals ===
23 April 2011 Preliminary round	Roscommon	4-20 - 0-03	New York	Croke Park, Dublin
3:00 PM	E. Lannon 2-03; D. Smith 1-05; K. Finn 1-02; T. Corcoran (1f), S. Jordan, F. Kelly, 0-02 each; C. Daly, M. Healy, T. McKenna, F. Sweeney, 0-01 each	Roscommon Herald	B. Twomey 0-02; S. Hogan 0-01	Referee: R. McBrien (Leitrim); Man of the Match: D. Smith (Roscommon)

25 June 2011 Quarter-Final	Sligo	1-06 - 2-11	Galway	Markievicz Park, Sligo
6:00 PM	G. Cadden 1-01; P. Logan (2f), N. Murphy, 0-02 each; S. Kilcoyne 0-01 (1f)	Irish Examiner	S. Walsh 0-4 (1f); I. Burke, S. Moran, 1-00 each; S. Maughan (1f), C. Rabbitte, 0-02 each; P. Glynn, G. Kelly, J. Kelleher, 0-01 each	Referee: L. Devenney (Mayo)

=== Semi-finals ===
26 June 2011 Semi-Final	Mayo	1-08 - 3-08	Roscommon	McHale Park, Castlebar
12:00 PM	E. Regan 1-02 (2f); R. Quirke 0-04 (3f); A. Jordan, J. Shaughnessey, 0-01 each	Irish Examiner	D. Smith 1-04; E. Smith 1-01; L. Conlon 1-00; T. Corcoran 0-02 (2f); F. Kelly 0-01	Referee: R. McBrien (Leitrim)

2 July 2011 Semi-Final	Galway	4-13 - 0-11	Leitrim	Páirc Seán Mac Diarmada, Carrick-on-Shannon
7:00 PM	S. Maughan 1-07 (5f); J. Kelleher 2-01; I. Burke 1-01; S. Walsh 0-02; P. Glynn, G. Armstrong, 0-01 each	The Connacht Sentinel	D. Wrynn 0-06 (6f); F. McHugh 0-03; C. Farrell, N. Moore, 0-01 each	Referee: P. Neilan (Roscommon)

=== Final ===
17 July 2011 Final	Roscommon	1-09 - 0-06	Galway	Dr. Hyde Park, Roscommon
12:00 PM	T. Corcoran (4f), D. Smith (2f), 0-04 each; E. Lannon 1-00; K. Finn 0-01	Galway Advertiser	S. Maughan 0-03 (1f); C. Mulryan, C. Rabbitte, S. Walsh, 0-01 each	Referee: R. McBrien (Leitrim)

== Munster Minor Football Championship ==
=== Quarter-finals ===
13 April 2011 Quarter-Final	Limerick	0-09 - 1-13	Tipperary	Kilmallock
6:30 PM	D. Tracey, D. Lillis, F. O'Riordan (1f), 0-02 each; J. Quaid, D. O'Dea, D. Frewen, 0-01 each	Munster GAA	T.J. Ryan 0-06 (3f); M. Quinlivan 1-02; P. Quirke (1f), D. Lonergan, 0-02 each; L. McGrath 0-01	Referee: S. Jay (Kerry)

13 April 2011 Quarter-Final	Kerry	4-16 - 0-06	Waterford	Austin Stack Park, Tralee
7:30 PM	T. Hickey 1-05 (4f); P. Boyle 2-01; J. O'Donoghue 0-05 (3f); J. Moriarty 1-01; C. Keating 0-02; M. O'Connor, S. Keane, 0-01 each	Munster GAA	G. Nugent, E. Power, T. Burke (2f), 0-02 each	Referee: K. O'Brien (Tipperary)

13 April 2011 Quarter-Final	Cork	2-10 - 0-11	Clare	Páirc Uí Rinn, Cork
7:30 PM	D. MacEoin 1-04 (2f); C. O'Sullivan 0-03; S. O'Mahony 1-00; B. O'Driscoll (1f), K. Crowley, K. McIntyre, 0-01 each	Munster GAA	N. Hickey 0-05 (3f); M. O'Leary 0-02; J. Malone, C. Cleary, E. Cleary (1f), W. Flynn, 0-01 each	Referee: R. Moloney (Limerick)

=== Play-offs ===
16 April 2011 1st Play-off	Waterford	1-09 - 4-14	Clare	Fraher Field, Dungarvan
7:00 PM	T. Burke 0-05 (4f); G. Nugent 0-03; D. Sheridan 1-00; E. O'Toole 0-01	Munster GAA	N. Hickey 2-02; C. Cleary 1-03; Eoin Cleary 0-05 (3f); M. O'Leary 1-01 (1-00 pen); J. Scanlon, A. O'Neill, C. McConigley, 0-01 each	Referee: J. Bermingham (Cork)

23 April 2011 2nd Play-off	Limerick	0-10 - 1-10	Clare	Gaelic Grounds, Limerick
7:30 PM	D. Frewen 0-07 (3f); D. Neville, F. O'Riordan (1f), J. Quaid, 0-01 each	Munster GAA	N. Hickey 0-05 (4f); A. Murrihy 1-00; C. Cleary, E. Cleary (1f), 0-02 each; M. O'Leary 0-01	Referee: J. Lynch (Kerry)

=== Semi-finals ===
18 May 2011 Semi-Final	Clare	0-06 - 1-16	Cork	Cusack Park, Ennis
7:00 PM	N. Hickey 0-03 (3f); E. Cleary 0-02 (1f); J. Malone 0-01.	Munster GAA	D. MacEoin 0-05; M. Sugrue 1-02; C. Vaughan 0-03 (2f); C. O'Sullivan, B. O'Driscoll (1 ‘45), 0-02 each; J. Corkery (1f), S. O'Mahony, 0-01 each	Referee: S. Joy (Kerry)

18 May 2011 Semi-Final	Tipperary	2-12 - 3-08	Kerry	Semple Stadium, Thurles
7:00 PM	C. Kennedy (1f), M. Quinlivan, 1-01 each; I. Fahey 0-04 (2f, 1 '45); L. McGrath 0-02; S. O'Brien, G. Henry, T.J. Ryan, P. Quirke, 0-01 each	Munster GAA	C. Keating 1-02; J. Moriarty 1-01; P. Boyle 1-00; K. McCarthy, J. O'Donoghue (2f), 0-02 each; S. McCarthy 0-01	Referee: J. Bermingham (Cork)

=== Final ===
3 July 2011 Final	Tipperary	3-11 - 1-09	Cork	Páirc Uí Chaoimh, Cork
12:00 PM	T.J. Ryan 0-06 (2f); M. Quinlivan (1-00 pen), G. Henry 1-01, each; L. McGrath 1-00; C. O'Riordan 0-02; I. Fahey 0-01 (1 '45)	Irish Examiner	D MacEoin 1-04 (0-03f); B. O'Driscoll 0-02 (2 '45); T. Brosnan, C. O'Sullivan, D. Harrington, 0-01 each	Referee: Padraig O'Sullivan (Kerry)

== Ulster Minor Football Championship ==
=== First round ===
15 May 2011 First round	Donegal	1-07 - 2-09	Antrim	MacCumhaill Park, Ballybofey
1:45 PM	P. McBrearty 1-03 (2f); J. O'Malley 0-02 (1f); R. McNamee, M. O'Reilly, 0-01 each	Irish Times	K. Quinn 2-01 (1f); R. Murray 0-05 (2f); M. Hynds, M. Jordan, D. McCann, 0-01 each	Referee: N. Cullen (Fermanagh)

=== Quarter-finals ===
22 May 2011 Quarter-Final	Derry	0-07 - 1-09	Fermanagh	Celtic Park, Derry
1:45 PM	A. O'Neill 0-04; J. Morgan, A. McElhone, N. McNicholl, 0-01 each	Irish Times	E. Courtney 0-04 (3f); R. McGrade 0-03 (2f); L. Leonard 1-00; J. Duffy, S. Lynch, 0-01 each	Referee: M. McNally (Monaghan)

28 May 2011 Quarter-Final	Armagh	3-11 - 5-04	Down	Athletic Grounds, Armagh
5:45 PM	P. McGeown 1-08 (1-00 pen, 7f, 1 '45); P. Grant, M. McKenna, 1-00 each; E. Rafferty 0-02; M. Murphy 0-01	Irish Times	S. McArdle, S. McCartan, 2-00 each; C. Mooney 1-01 (1f); J. Scannell 0-02 (1f); P. Murdock 0-01	Referee: N. Mooney (Cavan)

29 May 2011 Quarter-Final	Cavan	2-11 - 2-02	Antrim	Páirc Esler, Newry
7:00 PM	A. Graham 1-03; K. Bouchier 1-01; G. Dillon, C. Finnegan, C. McEnroe (1f), 0-02 each; M. Argue 0-01	Irish Times	R. Murray 1-01; F. O'Neill 1-00; R. Lynch 0-01	Referee: C. O'Hagan (Tyrone)

29 May 2011 Quarter-Final	Tyrone	0-15 - 1-05	Monaghan	Brewster Park, Enniskillen
7:00 PM	S. Hackett, D. McCurry (2f), D. McNulty (1f, 1 '45), 0-03 each; R. Devlin, M. Heagney, E. McGahan (2f), 0-02 each	Irish Times	M. McGuirk 1-03 (3f); C. Boyle, F. McGeough, 0-01 each	Referee: I. Molloy (Donegal)

=== Semi-finals ===
19 June 2011 Semi-Final	Fermanagh	0-07 - 2-18	Armagh	St. Tiernach's Park, Clones
12:15 PM	E. Courtney 0-03 (2f); B. Owens 0-02; J. Duffy, R. McGrade (1f), 0-01 each	Irish Times	P. McGeown (1f) 0-05; C. Cumiskey 1-01; P. Burns 1-00; P. Óg Grant, C. McNally (1f), C. O'Hanlon, E. Rafferty (1 '45), 0-02 each; M. Carson, A. Findon, C. Gough, R. McShane, 0-01 each	Referee: S. Hurson (Tyrone)

3 July 2011 Semi-Final	Tyrone	2-10 - 2-13	Cavan	Brewster Park, Enniskillen
7:00 PM	D. McNulty 1-01 (0-01f); D McCurry 0-05 (4f); S. Molloy 1-00; M. Cassidy 0-02 (1f); R. Mayse, P. Barker, 0-1 each	Irish Examiner	C. Finnegan 2-00; D. McVeety 0-03; J. Dillon, M. Argue, 0-02 each; P. Graham, A. Graham, K. Bouchier (1f), V. Coyle, N. O'Donnell, F. Moore, 0-1 each	Referee: B. Rice (Down)

=== Final ===
17 July 2011 Final	Armagh	1-06 - 0-12	Cavan	St. Tiernach's Park, Clones
2:00 PM	P. McGeown 1-02 (1f); C. White, E. Rafferty, C. Gough, C. McNally, 0-01 each	Irish Times	A. Graham 0-03; C. Finnegan, N. O'Donnell (1f), 0-02 each; G. Smith, M. Argue, P. Graham, A. Dewart, J. Dillon, D. McVeety, 0-01 each	Referee: C. O'Hagan (Tyrone)

== All-Ireland Series ==
=== Quarter-finals ===
30 July 2011 Quarter-Final	Roscommon	1-16 - 0-18	Armagh	Croke Park, Dublin
2:00 PM	D. Smith 1-02; T. Corcoran 0-04 (4f); C. Daly, K. Finn, 0-03 each; F. Sweeney 0-02; S. Jordan, E. Smith, 0-01 each	Irish Examiner	P. McGeown 0-05 (2f); C. O'Hanlon, R. McShane, 0-03 each; M. McKenna 0-02; C. Trainor, P. Burns, M. Carson (1f), D. McQuade, C. McNally, 0-01 each	Referee: C. Lane (Cork)

30 July 2011 Quarter-Final	Cavan	0-09 - 1-09	Galway	Pearse Park, Longford
3:00 PM	K. Bouchier 0-03; J. Dillon 0-02; D. McVeety, C. Finnegan, C. Brady, A. Graham, 0-01 each	Irish Examiner	S Walsh 0-06 (4f); S. Moran 1-00; G. Armstrong, I. Burke, C. Mulryan, 0-01 each	Referee: D. Brazil (Offaly)

1 August 2011 Quarter-Final	Tipperary	0-11 - 0-07	Meath	O'Moore Park, Portlaoise
2:00 PM	M. Quinlivan 0-04 (2f); I. Fahey (1f), P. Quirke (2f), 0-02 each; C. O'Riordan, D. Fitzelle, B. Maher, 0-01 each	Irish Times	B. McMahon 0-04 (3f); A. Forde, B. O'Brien, O'Sheridan, 0-01 each	Referee: B. Cassidy (Derry)

1 August 2011 Quarter-Final	Dublin	1-11 - 1-03	Cork	O'Moore Park, Portlaoise
4:00 PM	C. Kilkenny 0-05 (1f); P. Mannion 1-01 (1f); G. Ivory, D. Campbell, 0-02 each; E. Ó Conghaile 0-01	Irish Times	D. MacEoin 1-03 (3f)	Referee: C. Branaghan (Down)

=== Semi-finals ===
21 August 2011 Semi-Final	Tipperary	1-11 - 0-12	Roscommon	Croke Park, Dublin
1:30 PM	M. Quinlivan 1-01; I. Fahey 0-03 (1f); C. O'Riordan 0-02; S. O'Brien, TJ Ryan, G. Henry, L. McGrath, C. Kennedy, 0-01 each.	Report	D. Smith 0-04 L. Conlon, C. Daly 0-02 each; T. Corcoran, F. Kelly, E. Smith, M. Gunning, 0-1 each.	Referee: D. Brazil (Offaly)

28 August 2011 Semi-Final	Dublin	1-11 - 1-9	Galway	Croke Park, Dublin
1:30 PM	C. Kilkenny 0-6 (2f); S. Fulham 1-01; C. Costello, G. Ivory, P. Mannion, J. Small, 0-01 each	Report	S. Walsh 1-04 (1f); C. Rabbitte 0-03; I. Burke, S. Maughan, 0-01 each	Referee: R. O'Donnell (Donegal)

=== Final ===
18 September 2011 Final	Tipperary	3-09 - 1-14	Dublin	Croke Park, Dublin
13:15	L. McGrath 1-02 (1f); C. Kennedy 1-02 (2f); M. Quinlivan 1-01 (1-00 pen); P. Quirke 0-03; B. Maher 0-01	Report	C. Kilkenny 0-07; G. Ivory 1-01; P. Mannion 0-02; J. McCaffrey, E. Ó Conghaile, C. Costello, J. Small, 0-01 each	Referee: P. Hughes (Armagh)

== Championship statistics ==
=== Scoring ===
- Widest winning margin: 38 points
  - Wexford 7-17 - 0-00 Kilkenny (Round 1 Leinster Football Championship)
- Most goals in a match: 8
  - Armagh 3-11 - 5-04 Down (Ulster Quarter Final)
- Most points in a match: 35
  - Dublin 1-24 - 0-11 Kildare (Leinster Semi Final)
- Most goals by one team in a match: 7
  - Wexford 7-17 - 0-00 Kilkenny (Round 1 Leinster Football Championship)
- Most goals scored by a losing team: 5
  - Armagh 3-11 - 5-04 Down (Ulster Quarter Final)
- Most points by one team in a match: 24
  - Dublin 1-24 - 0-11 Kildare (Leinster Semi Final)
- Most points scored by a losing team: 18
  - Roscommon 1-16 - 0-18 Armagh (All-Ireland Quarter Final)

=== Top scorers ===
	Name	Team	Tally	Total
1	C. Kilkenny	Dublin	0-39	39
2	D. Smith	Roscommon	3-19	28
3	P. McGeown	Armagh	2-20	26
4	G. Ivory	Dublin	1-22	25
—	D. MacEoin	Cork	3-16	25
6	M. Quinlivan	Tipperary	5-09	24
7	C. Byrne	Louth	0-23	23
8	N. Hickey	Clare	2-15	21
9	B. McMahon	Meath	0-20	20
—	S. Walsh	Galway	1-17	20
—	S. Fulham	Dublin	5-05	20

* Where the total points are the same, players are ordered according to total scores. e.g. 2-19 is equal to 21 scores

== See also ==
- All-Ireland Senior Football Championship 2011
