= 2020 Munster Senior Football Championship =

2020 Munster SFC
Tournament details
- Year: 2020

Winners
- Champions: Tipperary (10th win)
- Manager: David Power
- Captain: Conor Sweeney

Runners-up
- Runners-up: Cork

The 2020 Munster Senior Football Championship was the 2020 installment of the annual Munster Senior Football Championship organised by the Munster GAA. The fixtures were announced on RTÉ Radio on 8 October 2019. Due to the impact of the COVID-19 pandemic on Gaelic games, all GAA activity was suspended until late in the year.

On 22 November 2020, Tipperary won the title after a 0-17 to 0-14 win against Cork in the final. It was Tipperary's first Munster title in 85 years.

To mark the centenary of Bloody Sunday, Tipperary wore special commemorative jerseys in white and green in the final, a replica of the colours worn by the Tipperary team which played Dublin in Croke Park in 1920.

== Teams ==
The Munster championship is contested by all six counties in the Irish province of Munster.

County	Colours	Manager	Captain	Most Recent Munster Title
Clare	Saffron and Blue	Colm Collins	Gary Brennan	1992
Cork	Red and white	Ronan McCarthy	Paul Kerrigan	2012
Kerry	Green and gold	Peter Keane	David Clifford	2019
Limerick	Green and white	Billy Lee	Donal O'Sullivan	1896
Tipperary	Blue and gold (final) White and Green	David Power	Conor Sweeney	1935
Waterford	White and blue	Benji Whelan	Paul Whyte	1898

== Bracket ==
Quarter-finals
Waterford	0-9
Limerick	2-14
Tipperary	2-11
Clare	1-11

Semi-finals
Limerick	2-11
Tipperary	1-15
Cork	1-12
Kerry	0-13

Final
Tipperary	0-17
Cork	0-14

== Quarter-finals ==
The four non-finalists of the 2019 championship entered this round. The lowest ranked counties to play in the quarter-finals were Limerick and Waterford of Division 4.

=== Summary ===
Div	Team 1	Score	Team 2	Div
4	Waterford	0-09 - 2-14	Limerick	4
3	Tipperary	2-11 - 1-11	Clare	2

=== Matches ===
31 October 2020 Quarter-final	Waterford (4)	0–09 (09) – (20) 2–14	Limerick (4)	Dungarvan
19:00 GMT (UTC+0)		(HT: 0-04 – 2-05)		Venue: Fraher Field
	Pts: J Curry 3 (2f), C Murray 2, D Guiry 1, D Corcoran 1, T Grey 1, S Ahearne 1 (1m).	Report	Gls: A Enright 1, C Fahy 1. Pts: H Bourke 4 (2f; 1m), D Lyons 2, S McSweeney 2 (1f), K Ryan 1, T McCarthy 1, I Corbett 1, C Fahy 1, G Brown 1, S O’Carroll 1.	Referee: Brendan Cawley (Kildare)

1 November 2020 Quarter-final	Tipperary (3)	2–11 (17) – (14) 1–11	Clare (2)	Thurles
13:00 GMT (UTC+0)		(HT: 1-06 – 0-05)		Venue: Semple Stadium
	Gls: C Sweeney 1, B Maher 1. Pts: C Sweeney 4 (2f); J Kennedy 3 (3f); L Casey 2; L Boland 1, E Moloney 1.	Report	Gls: J Feehan 1 (og). Pts: E Cleary 4 (4f); K Sexton 2 (2f), P Collins 2; Gary Brennan 1, C O'Connor 1, J Malone 1.	Referee: Conor Lane (Cork)

== Semi-finals ==
The two finalists from the 2019 championship entered this round along with the two quarter-final winners. The lowest ranked county to play in the semi-finals was Limerick of Division 4.

=== Summary ===
Div	Team 1	Score	Team 2	Div
4	Limerick	2-11 - 1-15	Tipperary	3
3	Cork	1-12 - 0-13	Kerry	1

=== Matches ===
7 November 2020 Semi-final	Limerick (4)	2–11 (17) – (18) 1–15 (a.e.t.)	Tipperary (3)	Limerick
13:15 GMT (UTC+0)		(HT: 2–6 – 0–5)		Venue: LIT Gaelic Grounds
	Gls: S McSweeney 1, C Fahey 1 Pts: S McSweeney 2, H Bourke 2 (2f), D O’Sullivan (1f, ’45) 2, T Griffin 1, K Ryan 1, D Treacy 1, C Sheehan 1, C Fahey 1.	Report	Gls: L Casey 1 Pts: C Sweeney 7 (5f), J Kennedy 2 (2f), L Boland 2, M Quinlivan 1, K Fahey 1, R Kiely 1, B Fox 1.	Referee: Maurice Deegan (Laois)

8 November 2020 Semi-final	Cork (3)	1–12 (15) – (13) 0–13 (a.e.t.)	Kerry (1)	Cork
16:00 GMT (UTC+0)		(HT: 0-06 – 0-05)		Venue: Páirc Uí Chaoimh
	Gls: M Keane 1. Pts: M Collins 4 (3fs), L Connolly 3 (2fs), K O'Hanlon 2 (1f 1 45), K O'Donovan 1, B Hurley 1 (m), S Powter 1.	Report	Pts: K Spillane 4, D Clifford 4 (1f), S O'Shea 2 (1f), R Buckley 1, D Moynihan 1, T Brosnan 1.	Referee: Derek O'Mahoney (Tipperary); TV: RTÉ

== Final ==
RTÉ

22 November 2020
13:30 GMT (UTC+0)
Final

Report

Tipperary	0-17 (17) – (14) 0-14	Cork
(HT: 0-11 - 0-07)
Pts: C Sweeney 7 (2fs, 2m); M Quinlivan 5 (1f); L Casey 2 (f); K Fahey 1, E Comerford 1 (free), P Austin 1.		Pts: L Connolly 4 (2fs, 1 45), M Collins 4 (4fs); J O’Rourke 2; C O’Callaghan 1, B Hurley 1, S White 1, C O’Mahony 1 (f).

Páirc Uí Chaoimh, Cork
Referee: Maurice Deegan (Laois)

Tipperary advanced to the 2020 All-Ireland SFC semi-finals.

== See also ==
- 2020 All-Ireland Senior Football Championship
  - 2020 Connacht Senior Football Championship
  - 2020 Leinster Senior Football Championship
  - 2020 Ulster Senior Football Championship
