= 2026 Munster Senior Football Championship =

Gaelic football championship in Ireland

2026 Munster SFC
Tournament details
- Province: Munster
- Year: 2026
- Trophy: Páidí Ó Sé Cup
- Date: 12 April – 10 May 2026
- Defending champions: Kerry

Winners
- Champions: Kerry (87th win)
- Manager: Jack O'Connor
- Captain: Paul Geaney

Runners-up
- Runners-up: Cork
- Manager: John Cleary
- Captain: Ian Maguire

The 2026 Munster Senior Football Championship was the 2026 installment of the annual Munster Senior Football Championship organised by Munster GAA. It was one of the four provincial competitions of the 2026 All-Ireland Senior Football Championship. The winning team received the Munster Cup. The draw for the championship was made on 27 November 2025. The defending champion was Kerry.

The defending champions Kerry defeated Cork 1-23 to 1-15 to retain the Páidí Ó Sé Cup for the 6th year in a row and win their 87th Munster Senior Football Championship.

== Teams ==
=== General Information ===
Six counties compete in the Munster Senior Football Championship:

County	Last Championship title	Last All-Ireland title	Position in 2025 Championship
Clare	1992	—	Runners-up
Cork	2012	2010	Semi-finals
Kerry	2025	2025	Champions
Limerick	1896	1896	Quarter-finals
Tipperary	2020	1920	Semi-finals
Waterford	1898	—	Quarter-finals

=== Personnel and kits ===
County	Manager	Captain(s)	Sponsors
Clare	Paul Madden	Cillian Rouine	Pat O'Donnell
Cork	John Cleary	Ian Maguire	Sports Direct
Kerry	Jack O'Connor	Paul Geaney	Kerry Group
Limerick	Jimmy Lee	Cillian Fahy	None
Tipperary	Niall Fitzgerald	Paudie Feehan	Clover
Waterford	Vacant	Conor Murray	Suir Engineering

== Bracket ==
Quarter-finals
12 April, Dungarvan
Waterford	1-7
Tipperary	0-15
12 April, Cork
Cork	4-16
Limerick	1-16

Semi-finals
25 April, Thurles
Tipperary	1-12
Cork	4-18
25 April, Ennis
Clare	1-14
Kerry	2-19

Final
10 May, Killarney
Cork	1-15
Kerry	1-23

== Quarter-finals ==
12 April 2026 Quarter-final	Tipperary	0-15 (15) – (10) 1-7	Waterford	Dungarvan
14:00 IST (UTC+1)		(HT: 0-5 - 1-3)		Venue: Fraher Field
	Pts: Seán O'Connor 0-6 (1tp, 2f), Cian Smith 0-4 (3f), Jack O'Neill 0-1, Charlie King 0-1, Eoin Craddock 0-1, Micheál Freaney 0-1, Killian Butler 0-1	Report	Pts: Michael O'Brien 1-0, Stephen Curry 0-2 (1f), Alan Dunwoody 0-2, Billy Hynes 0-1, Conor Murray 0-1, Adam Murray 0-1	Referee: Barry Tiernan (Dublin); Attendance: 846

12 April 2026 Quarter-final	Cork	4-16 (28) – (19) 1-16	Limerick	Cork
14:00 IST (UTC+1)		(HT: 4-10 - 0-7)		Venue: Páirc Uí Chaoimh
	Pts: Steven Sherlock 0-4 (1'45, 1f), Tommy Walsh 1-0, Ian Maguire 1-0, Seán McDonnell 1-0, Dara Sheedy 1-0, Mark Cronin 0-3, Conor Calahane 0-3, Paul Walsh 0-2, Chris Óg Jones 0-2, Luke Fahy 0-1, Brian Hurley 0-1	Report	Pts: James Naughton 1-4 (1pen, 1f), Eliah O'Riordan 0-5 (4'45, 1f), Barry Coleman 0-2 (tp), Killian Ryan 0-1, Rory O'Brien 0-1, Cillian Fahy 0-1, Peter Nash 0-1, Mark McCarthy 0-1	Referee: Séamus Mulhare (Laois); Attendance: 4,709

== Semi-finals ==
25 April 2026 Semi-final	Kerry	2-19 (25) – 1-14 (17)	Clare	Ennis
14:00		(HT: 0-13 - 1-6)		Venue: Cusack Park
	Pts: David Clifford 1-7 (2tpf), Paudie Clifford 1-3 (1tpf), Diarmuid O'Connor 0-3, Killian Spillane 0-2, Micheál Burns 0-2, Dylan Casey 0-1, Keith Evans 0-1	Report	Pts: Mark McInerney 0-6 (2tp, 1f), Aaron Griffin 0-4, Alan Sweeney 1-0, Conor Meaney 0-2, Cormac Murray 0-1, Brian McNamara 0-1	Referee: Thomas Murphy (Galway); Attendance: 5,526; TV: GAA+

25 April 2026 Semi-final	Tipperary	1-12 (15) – 4-18 (30)	Cork	Thurles
14:00		(HT: 1-4 - 1-5)		Venue: Semple Stadium
	Pts: Seân O'Connor 1-6 (1tpf, 1f), Micheál Freany 0-2 (1tp), Eoin Craddock 0-1, Cian Smith 0-1 (1f), Daithí Hogan 0-1, Killian Butler 0-1	Report	Pts: Chris Óg Jones 2-2, Steven Sherlock 0-7 (1tp, 2f), Colm O'Callaghan 1-0, Conor Corbett 1-0, Luke Fahy 0-3, Brian Hurley 0-3 (1tp), Brian O'Driscoll 0-1, Mark Cronin 0-1, Ruairí Deane 0-1	Referee: Fergal Kelly (Longford); Attendance: 1,755

== Final ==
10 May 2026 Final	Kerry	1-23 (26) – 1-15 (18)	Cork	Killarney
13:45		(HT: 0-10 - 0-13)		Venue: Fitzgerald Stadium
	Pts: David Clifford 1-6 (1tp, 1f), Tony Brosnan 0-5 (1tp), Keith Evans 0-2, Armin Heinrich 0-2, Tomás Kennedy 0-2 (2f), Mike Breen 0-1, Paudie Clifford 0-1, Gavin White 0-1, Killian Spillane 0-1, Dylan Geaney 0-1	Report	Pts: Mark Cronin 0-5 (1tp, 1f), Brian O'Driscoll 1-2 (1tp), Sean McDonnell 0-2, Chris Óg Jones 0-2, Steven Sherlock 0-2 (1 s/l, 1 45), Colm O'Callaghan 0-1, David Buckley 0-1	Referee: Paul Faloon (Down); Attendance: 32,691; TV: RTÉ2

== Statistics ==
=== Scoring events ===
- Widest winning margin: 15 points
  - Cork 4-18 – 1-12 Tipperary (Semi-finals)
- Most goals in a match: 5
  - Cork 4-16 – 1-16 Limerick (Quarter-finals)
  - Cork 4-18 – 1-12 Tipperary (Semi-finals)
- Most points in a match: 38
  - Kerry 1-23 – 1-15 Cork (Final)
- Most goals by one team in a match: 4
  - Cork 4-16 – 1-16 Limerick (Quarter-finals)
  - Cork 4-18 – 1-12 Tipperary (Semi-finals)
- Most points by one team in a match: 23
  - Kerry 1-23 – 1-15 Cork (Final)
- Highest aggregate score: 47 points
  - Cork 4-16 – 1-16 Limerick (Quarter-finals)
- Lowest aggregate score: 25 points
  - Tipperary 0-15 - 1-7 Waterford (Quarter-finals)

== Stadia and attendance ==
County	Location	Province	Stadium	Capacity
Clare	Ennis	Munster	Cusack Park	20,100
Cork	Cork	Munster	Páirc Uí Chaoimh	45,300
Kerry	Killarney	Munster	Fitzgerald Stadium	38,000
Limerick	Limerick	Munster	Gaelic Grounds	44,023
Tipperary	Thurles	Munster	Semple Stadium	45,690
Waterford	Waterford	Munster	Fraher Field	15,000

Total attendance	45,797
Average attendance	9,159
Highest attendance	32,961; Keryy 1-23 - 1-15 Cork; 10 May 2026

== See also ==
- 2026 All-Ireland Senior Football Championship
  - 2026 Connacht Senior Football Championship
  - 2026 Leinster Senior Football Championship
  - 2026 Ulster Senior Football Championship
