= 2023 All-Ireland Senior Football Championship =

Championship details
- Dates: 8 April – 30 July 2023
- Teams: 33

All-Ireland Champions
- Winning team: Dublin (31st win)
- Captain: James McCarthy
- Manager: Dessie Farrell

All-Ireland Finalists
- Losing team: Kerry
- Captain: David Clifford
- Manager: Jack O'Connor

Provincial Champions
- Munster: Kerry
- Leinster: Dublin
- Ulster: Derry
- Connacht: Galway

Championship statistics
- Top Scorer: Shane McGuigan (2–52)
- Player of the Year: David Clifford

The 2023 All-Ireland Senior Football Championship (SFC) was the 137th edition of the Gaelic Athletic Association's premier inter-county Gaelic football tournament since its establishment in 1887. Thirty one of the thirty two Irish counties took part – Kilkenny did not compete, while London and New York completed the lineup.

The championship worked as a two-tier system for the second time, with the Tailteann Cup being the second tier competition for those that do not qualify for the Sam Maguire Cup competition.

The draws for the provincial championships took place on 15 October 2022. The final was played on 30 July 2023 at Croke Park in Dublin, between defending champion Kerry and Leinster champion Dublin. Dublin won a 31st title, with a 1–15 to 1–13 win against Kerry in that game.

== Format ==
=== Provincial Championships ===
Connacht, Leinster, Munster and Ulster each organise a provincial championship. All provincial matches are knock-out.

=== Group stage format ===
Sixteen teams progress to the All-Ireland Championship round-robin:

- The 4 provincial champions
- The 4 beaten provincial finalists
- The 2022 Tailteann Cup winners (Westmeath)
- The 7 next-ranked teams, based on final position in the 2023 National Football League
  - Position is based on standing after promotion and relegation are applied and after finals are played; therefore, the top two teams in Division 2 outrank the bottom two teams in Division 1, and if the 2nd placed team in Division 2 wins the final, they are ranked above the 1st place finishers who lost the final.
  - If Westmeath reach the Leinster final, then an 8th team will be chosen based on league position.

The other 17 county teams compete in the 2023 Tailteann Cup.

In the All-Ireland Championship round-robin, 16 teams are drawn into four groups of four teams. Each team plays the other teams in its group once, earning 2 points for a win and 1 for a draw. Each team plays one home, one away and one neutral fixture.

The top three in each group advance to the knockout stages; first-place teams to the All-Ireland quarter-finals, and second- and third-placed teams to the preliminary quarter-finals.

=== All-Ireland format ===
The four second-placed teams play against the third-placed teams in the preliminary quarter-finals. The winners of the preliminary quarter-finals advance to play the group winners in the All-Ireland quarter-finals. Two semi-finals and a final follow. All matches are knock-out.

=== Teams by province ===
The participating teams, listed by province, with numbers in parentheses indicating final positions in the 2023 National Football League before the championship were:

Britain (1)

- London (32)

Connacht (5)

- Galway (2)
- Leitrim (29)
- Mayo (1)
- Roscommon (3)
- Sligo (23)

Leinster (11)

- Carlow (30)
- Dublin (7)
- Kildare (13)
- Laois (27)
- Longford (25)
- Louth (11)
- Meath (14)
- Offaly (21)
- Westmeath (20)
- Wexford (28)
- Wicklow (24)

Munster (6)

- Clare (17)
- Cork (12)
- Kerry (5) (title-holders)
- Limerick (18)
- Tipperary (26)
- Waterford (31)

Ulster (9)

- Antrim (22)
- Armagh (9)
- Cavan (15)
- Derry (8)
- Down (19)
- Donegal (10)
- Fermanagh (16)
- Monaghan (6)
- Tyrone (4)

Other (1)

- New York (DNE)

== Teams ==
Thirty three counties competed in the All-Ireland Senior Football Championship: seven teams in the Connacht Senior Football Championship, eleven teams in the Leinster Senior Football Championship, six teams in the Munster Senior Football Championship and nine teams in the Ulster Senior Football Championship.

County	Last Provincial Title	Last Championship Title	Position in 2022 Championship	Current Championship
Antrim	1951	—	Round 1 (Tailteann Cup)	Ulster Senior Football Championship
Armagh	2008	2002	Quarter-finals	Ulster Senior Football Championship
Carlow	1944	—	Quarter-finals (Tailteann Cup)	Leinster Senior Football Championship
Cavan	2020	1952	Runners-up (Tailteann Cup)	Ulster Senior Football Championship
Clare	1992	—	Quarter-finals	Munster Senior Football Championship
Cork	2012	2010	Quarter-finals	Munster Senior Football Championship
Derry	2022	1993	Semi-finals	Ulster Senior Football Championship
Donegal	2019	2012	Qualifiers Round 2	Ulster Senior Football Championship
Down	1994	1994	Round 1 (Tailteann Cup)	Ulster Senior Football Championship
Dublin	2022	2020	Semi-finals	Leinster Senior Football Championship
Fermanagh	—	—	Quarter-finals (Tailteann Cup)	Ulster Senior Football Championship
Galway	2022	2001	Runners-up	Connacht Senior Football Championship
Kerry	2022	2022	Champions	Munster Senior Football Championship
Kildare	2000	1928	Qualifiers Round 2	Leinster Senior Football Championship
Laois	2003	—	Round 1 (Tailteann Cup)	Leinster Senior Football Championship
Leitrim	1994	—	Quarter-finals (Tailteann Cup)	Connacht Senior Football Championship
Limerick	1896	1896	Qualifiers Round 2	Munster Senior Football Championship
London	—	—	Round 1 (Tailteann Cup)	Connacht Senior Football Championship
Longford	1968	—	Round 1 (Tailteann Cup)	Leinster Senior Football Championship
Louth	1957	1957	Qualifiers Round 1	Leinster Senior Football Championship
Mayo	2021	1951	Quarter-finals	Connacht Senior Football Championship
Meath	2010	1999	Qualifiers Round 1	Leinster Senior Football Championship
Monaghan	2015	—	Qualifiers Round 1	Ulster Senior Football Championship
New York	—	—	Quarter-finals (Tailteann Cup)	Connacht Senior Football Championship
Offaly	1997	1982	Semi-finals (Tailteann Cup)	Leinster Senior Football Championship
Roscommon	2019	1944	Qualifiers Round 2	Connacht Senior Football Championship
Sligo	2007	—	Semi-finals (Tailteann Cup)	Connacht Senior Football Championship
Tipperary	2020	1920	Round 1 (Tailteann Cup)	Munster Senior Football Championship
Tyrone	2021	2021	Qualifiers Round 1	Ulster Senior Football Championship
Waterford	1898	—	Preliminary round (Tailteann Cup)	Munster Senior Football Championship
Westmeath	2004	—	Champions (Tailteann Cup)	Leinster Senior Football Championship
Wexford	1945	1918	Preliminary round (Tailteann Cup)	Leinster Senior Football Championship
Wicklow	—	—	Round 1 (Tailteann Cup)	Leinster Senior Football Championship

== Provincial championships ==
=== Connacht Senior Football Championship ===
Quarter-finals

Semi-finals

Final

London
0-12

Sligo
2-20

Sligo
2-16

New York
0-06

New York
0-15 (2)

Leitrim
0-15 (0)

Sligo
0-12

Galway
2-20

Roscommon
2-08

Mayo
0-10

Roscommon
1-09

Galway
1-13

==== Quarter-finals ====
8 April 2023 Quarter-final	London	0–12 – 2–20	Sligo	Ruislip
15:00	Christopher Farley (0–6, 6f), Aidan McLoughlin (0–2), Enda Lynn (0–1), Christopher Duggan (0–1), Liam Gavaghan (0–1), Conal Gallagher (0–1)	Report	Pat Spillane (1–4), Sean Carrabine (1–1,1f), Niall Murphy 0–3, 1f), Patrick O'Connor (0–3, 1m), Cian Lally (0–3), Paul Kilcoyne (0–1), Paul McNamara (0–1), Luke Towey (0–1), Nathan Mullen (0–1), Donal Conlon (0–1), Alan Reilly (0–1,1f)	Stadium: McGovern Park; Referee: Brendan Cawley (Kildare)

8 April 2023 Quarter-final	New York	0–15 – 0–15 (aet); 2–0 pens	Leitrim	New York
18:00 EDT (UTC−04:00)	Connell Ahearne 0–4 (0-2f, 0-2m), Shane Carthy 0–3, (0-1f), Mick Cunningham 0–1 (0-1f), Shane Brosnan 0–1, Adrian Varley 0–2 (0-1f), Mikey Brosnan 0–1, Peter Fox 0–1, Daniel O’Sullivan 0–1, Jack Reilly 0–1.	Report	Keith Beirne 0–9, (0-5f, 0-1m), Evan Sweeney 0–3, Mark Plunkett 0–2, Paul Keaney 0–1 (0-1f)	Stadium: Gaelic Park; Referee: David Coldrick (Meath)

9 April 2023 Quarter-final	Mayo	0–10 – 2–8	Roscommon	Castlebar
16:00	Colm Reape 0–2 (2fs), Ryan O’Donoghue 0–2 (2fs), Paddy Durcan 0–1, Donnacha McHugh 0–1, Matthew Ruane 0–1, Tommy Conroy 0–1, Aidan O’Shea 0–1, Cillian O’Connor 0–1.	Report	Diarmuid Murtagh 0–6 (4fs), Enda Smith 1–1 (1–0 pen), Donie Smith 1–0, Conor Cox 0–1.	Stadium: McHale Park; Attendance: 19,361; Referee: Noel Mooney (Cavan)

==== Semi-finals ====
23 April 2023 Semi-final	Roscommon	1–9 – 1–13	Galway	Roscommon
16:00	Ciaráin Murtagh 1–6 (3fs), Cian McKeon 0–2, Conor Daly 0–1.	Report	Damien Comer 1–4, John Maher, Matthew Tierney (1m), and Shane Walsh 0–2, Cathal Sweeney, Ian Burke, and Johnny Heaney 0–1 each.	Stadium: Dr Hyde Park; Attendance: 16,917; Referee: D Gough (Meath); Man of the Match: Ciarán Murtagh

22 April 2023 Semi-final	Sligo	2–16 – 0–6	New York	Sligo
14:30	Patrick O’Connor 2–1, Niall Murphy 0–5 (2fs), Sean Carrabine 0–3 (2f), Pat Spillane 0–2, Cian Lally 0–2, Paul McNamara 0–1, Luke Towey 0–1, Paul Kilcoyne 0–1	Report	Gavin O’Brien 0–2, Adrian Varley 0–2 (1 ‘mark’), Bill Maher 0–1, Connell Ahearne 0–1 (1 ‘mark’)	Stadium: Markievicz Park; Attendance: 5,677; Referee: Barry Cassidy (Derry)

==== Final ====
7 May 2023 Final	Sligo	0–12 – 2–20	Galway	Castlebar
13:45	Seán Carrabine 0–4 (2fs), Darragh Cummins and Niall Murphy (1f, 145) 0–3 each, Paul Kilcoyne and Pat Spillane 0–1 each.	Report	Matthew Tierney 2–7 (1f, 145), Cathal Sweeney, Johnny Heaney, Ian Burke, and Shane Walsh (2fs) 0–2 each, Dylan McHugh, Cillian McDaid, Peter Cooke, Seán Kelly, and Tomo Culhane 0–1 each.	Stadium: McHale Park; Attendance: 11,867; Referee: Brendan Cawley (Kildare); Man of the Match: Matthew Tierney

=== Leinster Senior Football Championship ===
Preliminary round

Quarter-finals

Semi-finals

Final

Offaly
1-11

Longford
1-11

Meath
0-10

Offaly
1-12

Offaly
2-15

Louth
0-27*

Westmeath
1-11

Louth
2-10

Louth
0-15

Wicklow
2-12

Dublin
5-21

Carlow
0-10

Wicklow
0-10

Kildare
1-17

Kildare
0-12

Wexford
2-13

Dublin
0-14

Laois
2-17

Laois
2-09

Dublin
4-30

==== Preliminary Round ====
9 April 2023 Preliminary Round	Longford	1–11 – 1–12	Offaly	Longford
15:00	Darren Gallagher 1–4 (2fs), Joe Hagan 0–3, Iarla O’Sullivan 0–1, Mickey Quinn 0–1, Dessie Reynolds 0–1, Dylan Farrell 0–1	Report	Peter Cunningham 1–1, Cian Farrell 0–3 (1m), Nigel Dunne 0–2 (1f), Jamie Evans 0–2, Lee Pearson 0–1, Ruairi McNamee 0–1, Dylan Hyland 0–1 (1f), Bernard Allen 0–1.	Stadium: Pearse Park; Attendance: ~1,000; Referee: Sean Hurson (Tyrone)

9 April 2023 Preliminary Round	Wicklow	2–12 – 0–10	Carlow	Aughrim
14:30	Eoin Darcy 1–2 (1f), Kevin Quinn 0–4 (1f), Malachy Stone 1–0, Mark Jackson 0–2 (2fs), Mark Kenny 0–2, Padraig O'Toole 0–1, Gearoid Murphy 0–1.	Report	Darragh Foley 0–4 (3fs), Colm Hulton 0–3, Jordan Morrissey 0–1, Ross Dunphy 0–1, Jamie Clarke 0–1	Stadium: Aughrim Park; Attendance: 2,000; Referee: Barry Tiernan (Dublin)

9 April 2023 Preliminary Round	Laois	2–17 – 2–13	Wexford	Portlaoise
15:30	Mark Barry 2–4 (2fs, 1m), Evan O'Carroll 0–6 (1f, 1m, 145), Paul Kingston 0–4 (3fs), Damon Larkin 0–2, Paddy O'Sullivan 0–1	Report	Ben Brosnan 1–7 (1–0 pen, 5fs), Robbie Brooks 1–1, Sean Nolan 0–2, Paudie Hughes 0–1, Kevin O'Grady 0–1, Eoghan Nolan 0–1 (1 45)	Stadium: Laois Hire O'Moore Park, Referee: Conor Lane (Cork)

==== Quarter-finals ====
23 April 2023 Quarter-final	Laois	2–9 – 4–30	Dublin	Portlaoise
3:30pm		Report		Stadium: Laois Hire O'Moore Park; Referee: Barry Judge (Sligo)

23 April 2023 Quarter-final	Offaly	1–11 – 0–10	Meath	Tullamore
4:00pm		Report		Stadium: Glenisk O'Connor Park; Attendance: 5,041; Referee: S Mulhare (Laois)

23 April 2023 Quarter-final	Kildare	1–17 – 0–10	Wicklow	Navan
2:00pm		Report		Stadium: Pairc Tailteann; Referee: Martin McNally (Monaghan)

23 April 2023 Quarter-final	Westmeath	1–11 – 2–10	Louth	Carlow
2:30pm		Report		Stadium: Netwatch Cullen Park; Referee: James Molloy (Galway)

==== Semi-finals ====
30 April 2023 Semi-final	Kildare	0–12 – 0–14	Dublin	Dublin
				Stadium: Croke Park; Attendance: 30,499; Referee: Fergal Kelly (Longford)

30 April 2023 Semi-final	Offaly	2–15 – 0–27 (aet)	Louth	Dublin
		Report		Stadium: Croke Park; Attendance: 30,499; Referee: J McQuillan (Cavan)

==== Final ====
14 May 2023 Final	Louth	0–15 – 5–21	Dublin	Dublin
	S Mulroy (0–10, 7f, 1'45), C Grimes (0–2), L Jackson (0–1), C Downey (0–1), C Lennon (0–1)	Report	S Bugler (1–3), C Costello (0–5, 3f, 1'45), P Mannion (1–1, 1f), C O'Callaghan (0–4), C Kilkenny (0–3), J McCarthy (1–0), C Basquel (1–0), P Small (1–0), J McCaffrey (0–2), J Small (0–1), S McMahon (0–1), D Rock (0–1)	Stadium: Croke Park; Attendance: 40,115; Referee: Conor Lane (Cork)

=== Munster Senior Football Championship ===
Quarter-finals

Semi-finals

Final

Clare
1-16

Limerick
0-16

Cork
0-13

Clare
0-14

Clare
0-15

Kerry
5-14

Tipperary
3-09

Waterford
1-11

Tipperary
0-05

Kerry
0-25

==== Quarter-finals ====
9 April 2023 Quarter-final	Clare	0–14 – 0–13	Cork	Ennis
	Keelan Sexton and Eoin Cleary (1f) 0–4 each, Emmet McMahon 0–2, Jamie Malone, Padraic Collins, Gavin Cooney, and Cillian Rouine 0–1 each.	Report	Steven Sherlock 0–10 (7fs, 145), Sean Powter, Rory Maguire, and Kevin O'Donovan 0–1 each.	Stadium: Cusack Park; Attendance: 3,661; Referee: Fergal Kelly (Longford)

9 April 2023 Quarter-final	Tipperary	3–09 – 1–11	Waterford	Thurles
	Steven O'Brien 1–3, Stephen Quirke 1–1, Sean O'Connor 0–2, Jack Kennedy 0–2, Paudie Feehan 1–0, Colman Kennedy 0–1	Report	Darragh Corcoran 1–4, Jason Curry 0–5, Dermot Ryan 0–2	Stadium: Semple Stadium; Attendance: 1,443; Referee: James Molloy (Galway)

==== Semi-finals ====
22 April 2023 Semi-final	Limerick	0–15 – 1–15	Clare	Limerick
7:00pm				Stadium: Gaelic Grounds; Attendance: 3,616

22 April 2023 Semi-final	Kerry	0–25 – 0–05	Tipperary	Killarney
4:00pm		Report		Stadium: Fitzgerald Stadium; Attendance: 6,939; Referee: Conor Lane (Cork)

==== Final ====
7 May 2023	Kerry	5–14–0–15	Clare	Limerick
		Report		Stadium: Gaelic Grounds; Attendance: 12,499; Referee: Jerome Henry (Mayo)

=== Ulster Senior Football Championship ===
Preliminary round

Quarter-finals

Semi-finals

Final

Fermanagh
2–8

Derry
3–17

Derry
1–21

Monaghan
2–10

Tyrone
1–18

Monaghan
2–17

Derry
1–15 (3)

Armagh
0–18 (1)

Down
2–13

Donegal
1–11

Down
0–12

Armagh
4–10

Cavan
0–12

Armagh
0–20

Armagh
1–14

Antrim
1–8

==== Preliminary round ====
8 April 2023 Preliminary round	Armagh	0–20 – 1–8	Antrim	Armagh
17:00 IST (UTC+1)	Conor Turbitt 0–8 (0–3f, 0–1m), Shane McPartlan 0–4, Rory Grugan 0–3 (0–1f), Ethan Rafferty 0–1 (0–1f), Ciaran Mackin 0–1, Stefan Campbell 0–1, Jemar Hall 0–1, Tiernan Kelly 0–1	Report	Conor Stewart 1–1, Ruairi McCann (Creggan) 0–1 (0–1f), Ryan Murray 0–1 (0–1f), Eoghan McCabe 0–1, James McAuley 0–1, Pat Shivers 0–1, Ruairi McCann (Aghagallon) 0–1, Odhrán Eastwood 0–1	Stadium: Athletic Grounds; Attendance: 10,063; Referee: Jerome Henry

==== Quarter-finals ====
15 April 2023 Quarter-final	Fermanagh	2–8 – 3–17	Derry	Enniskillen
17:00 IST (UTC+1)	Ché Cullen 2–0, Ryan Lyons 0–2 (0–2f), Ultán Kelm 0–2, Seán McNally 0–1 (0–1 '45), Ryan Jones 0–1, Aidan Breen 0–1, Declan McCusker 0–1	Report	Shane McGuigan 2–5 (1–0 pen, 0–1f), Paul Cassidy 1–2, Padraig Cassidy 0–2, Odhran Lynch 0–1, Padraig McGrogan 0–1, Conor McCluskey 0–1, Conor Glass 0–1, Brendan Rogers 0–1, Niall Toner 0–1, Ethan Doherty 0–1, Eoin McEvoy 0–1	Stadium: Brewster Park; Attendance: 6,928; Referee: Joe McQuillan

16 April 2023 Quarter-final	Tyrone	1–18 – 2–17	Monaghan	Omagh
16:00 IST (UTC+1)	Darragh Canavan 1–5 (0–1f), Darren McCurry 0–5 (0–3f), Mattie Donnelly 0–3, Conor Meyler 0–2, Niall Morgan 0–1 (0–1 '45), Niall Sludden 0–1, Conn Kilpatrick 0–1	Report	Conor McManus 0–9 (0–8f), Ryan O'Toole 1–1, Stephen O'Hanlon 1–0, Jack McCarron 0–2 (0–2f), Conor McCarthy 0–2, Micheál Bannigan 0–1, Kieran Duffy 0–1, Shane Carey 0–1	Stadium: Healy Park; Attendance: 10,067; Referee: Niall Cullen

22 April 2023 Quarter-final	Cavan	0–12 – 1–14	Armagh	Cavan
18:30 IST (UTC+1)	Paddy Lynch 0–4 (0–1f, 0–1m), Gearóid McKiernan 0–3 (0–1f), Cian Madden 0–2, Raymond Galligan 0–1 (0–1 '45), Oisin Brady 0–1, Conor Brady 0–1	Report	Conor Turbitt 0–7 (0–3f), Ben Crealey 1–0, Ethan Rafferty 0–1 (0–1 '45), Rory Grugan 0–1 (0–1f), Conor O'Neill 0–1, Greg McCabe 0–1, Shane McPartlan 0–1, Jemar Hall 0–1, Andrew Murnin 0–1	Stadium: Breffni Park; Attendance: 11,527; Referee: Paul Faloon

23 April 2023 Quarter-final	Down	2–13 – 1–11	Donegal	Newry
14:00 IST (UTC+1)	Pat Havern 1–3 (1–0 pen, 0–3f), Ryan Johnston 0–3 (0–2m), Liam Kerr 1–0, Andrew Gilmore 0–2 (0–1f), Daniel Guinness 0–2, Danny Magill 0–1, Eugene Branagan 0–1, Conor Poland 0–1	Report	Jason McGee 1–1, Daire Ó Baoill 0–3, Ciarán Thompson 0–2 (0–2f), Conor O'Donnell 0–2, Shaun Patton 0–1 (0–1 '45), Caolan Ward 0–1, Oisín Gallen 0–1	Stadium: Páirc Esler; Attendance: 9,139; Referee: Brendan Cawley

==== Semi-finals ====
29 April 2023 Semi-final	Derry	1–21 – 2–10	Monaghan	Omagh
17:00 IST (UTC+1)	Shane McGuigan 0–9 (0–5f), Conor McCluskey 1–0, Padraig McGrogan 0–2, Conor Glass 0–2, Paul Cassidy 0–2, Ethan Doherty 0–2, Niall Toner 0–1 (0–1f), Odhran Lynch 0–1, Conor Doherty 0–1, Brendan Rogers 0–1	Report	Karl O'Connell 1–1, Conor McManus 0–3 (0–3f), Karl Gallagher 1–0, Rory Beggan 0–2 (0–2f), Conor Boyle 0–1, Stephen O'Hanlon 0–1, Micheál Bannigan 0–1, Kieran Hughes 0–1	Stadium: Healy Park; Attendance: 13,371; Referee: Sean Hurson

30 April 2023 Semi-final	Armagh	4–10 – 0–12	Down	Clones
16:00 IST (UTC+1)	Andrew Murnin 1–1, Shane McPartlan 1–0, Ciaran Mackin 1–0, Rían O'Neill 1–0, Jason Duffy 0–2, Rory Grugan 0–1 (0–1f), Callum Cumiskey 0–1, Conor O'Neill 0–1, Aidan Forker 0–1, Aidan Nugent 0–1, Jemar Hall 0–1, Stefan Campbell 0–1	Report	Pat Havern 0–6 (0–5f), Ryan McEvoy 0–2 (0–2f), Andrew Gilmore 0–1, Ryan Johnston 0–1, Liam Kerr 0–1, Patrick Branagan 0–1	Stadium: St Tiernach's Park; Attendance: 22,520; Referee: Conor Lane

==== Final ====
14 May 2023 Final	Derry	1–15 – 0–18 (a.e.t.) (3–1 p)	Armagh	Clones
16:00 IST (UTC+1)	Shane McGuigan 0–7 (0–2f), Brendan Rogers 1–2, Niall Toner 0–2 (0–2f), Gareth McKinless 0–1, Conor Glass 0–1, Niall Loughlin 0–1, Lachlan Murray 0–1	Report	Rían O'Neill 0–6 (0–3f, 0–1 '45), Rory Grugan 0–2 (0–2f), Jarlath Óg Burns 0–2 (0–1m), Ethan Rafferty 0–2, Stefan Campbell 0–2, Greg McCabe 0–1 (0–1m), Conor O'Neill 0–1, Ciaran Mackin 0–1, Ross McQuillan 0–1	Stadium: St Tiernach's Park; Attendance: 28,720; Referee: David Gough
	Penalties
	Shane McGuigan; Paul Cassidy; Conor Glass; Ciaran McFaul		Rían O'Neill; Callum Cumiskey; Aidan Nugent; Ethan Rafferty

== Team allocation and draw ==
=== Team allocation ===
All-Ireland Senior Football Championship
Group Stage
Kerry (1st)	Dublin (1st)	Galway (1st)	Derry (1st)
Clare (2nd)	Louth (2nd)	Sligo (2nd)	Armagh (2nd)
Mayo (NFL)	Roscommon (NFL)	Tyrone (NFL)	Monaghan (NFL)
Cork (NFL)	Kildare (NFL)	Donegal (NFL)	Westmeath (TC)
Tailteann Cup
Preliminary quarter-finals
New York			
Group Stage
Meath	Cavan	Fermanagh	Limerick
Down	Offaly	Antrim	Wicklow
Longford	Tipperary	Laois	Wexford
Leitrim	Carlow	Waterford	London

=== Format ===
16 teams were divided into 4 groups of 4 teams and played a round robin to qualify for the knockout stages of the All-Ireland. Group games took place between 20 May and 18 June 2023.

Key to colours
Qualified for round-robin phase	by reaching provincial final
Qualified for round-robin phase	by winning 2022 Tailteann Cup
Qualified for round-robin phase	based on NFL position
Compete in 2023 Tailteann Cup	

Ranking	Team	
1	Mayo	NFL champions
2	Galway	NFL finalists
3	Roscommon	Div 1 – 3rd
4	Tyrone	Div 1 – 4th
5	Kerry	Div 1 – 5th
6	Monaghan	Div 1 – 6th
7	Dublin	Div 2 champions
8	Derry	Div 2 finalists
9	Armagh	Div 1 – 7th
10	Donegal	Div 1 – 8th
11	Louth	Div 2 – 3rd
12	Cork	Div 2 – 4th
13	Kildare	Div 2 – 5th
14	Meath	Div 2 – 6th
15	Cavan	Div 3 champions
16	Fermanagh	Div 3 finalists
17	Clare	Div 2 – 7th
18	Limerick	Div 2 – 8th
19	Down	Div 3 – 3rd
20	Westmeath	Div 3 – 4th
21	Offaly	Div 3 – 5th
22	Antrim	Div 3 – 6th
23	Sligo	Div 4 champions
24	Wicklow	Div 4 finalists
25	Longford	Div 3 – 7th
26	Tipperary	Div 3 – 8th
27	Laois	Div 4 – 3rd
28	Wexford	Div 4 – 4th
29	Leitrim	Div 4 – 5th
30	Carlow	Div 4 – 6th
31	Waterford	Div 4 – 7th
32	London	Div 4 – 8th
33	New York	Did not enter

=== Qualified teams ===
Teams qualified to the All-Ireland group stage.

Team	Qualified as	Qualified on	Previous appearances in group stage
Armagh	Ulster runners-up		1 (2022)
Clare	Munster runners-up		1 (2022)
Cork	League position		1 (2022)
Derry	Ulster champions		1 (2022)
Donegal	League position		1 (2022)
Dublin	Leinster champions		1 (2022)
Galway	Connacht champions		1 (2022)
Kerry	Munster champions		1 (2022)
Kildare	League position		1 (2022)
Louth	Leinster runners-up		1 (2022)
Mayo	League position		1 (2022)
Monaghan	League position		1 (2022)
Roscommon	League position		1 (2022)
Sligo	Connacht runners-up		0 (debut)
Tyrone	League position		1 (2022)
Westmeath	Tailteann Cup winners		0 (debut)

=== Group Stage seeding ===
Numbers in brackets indicate ranking in the 2023 NFL.

Pot 1

- Galway (2)
- Kerry (5)
- Dublin (7)
- Derry (8)

Pot 2

- Armagh (9)
- Louth (11)
- Clare (17)
- Sligo (23)

Pot 3

- Mayo (1)
- Roscommon (3)
- Tyrone (4)
- Monaghan (6)

Pot 4

- Donegal (10)
- Cork (12)
- Kildare (13)
- Westmeath (20)

== Group stage ==
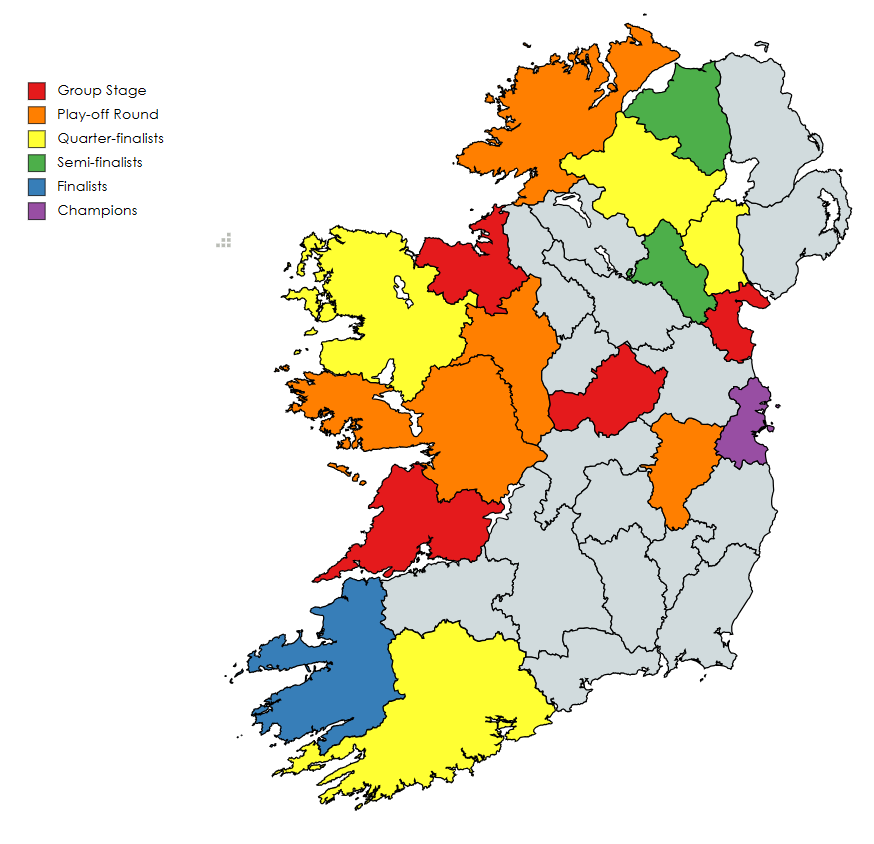
Results of teams participating in the 2023 All-Ireland Senior Football Championship

=== Group 1 ===
Pos	Team	Pld	W	D	L	PF	PA	PD	Pts	Qualification
1	Kerry	3	2	0	1	73	48	+25	4 (Note: Kerry, Cork and Mayo are ranked by score difference. Cork are placed above Mayo because of their greater number of total points scored.)	Advance to quarter-final
2	Cork	3	2	0	1	54	51	+3	4	Advance to preliminary quarter-final
3	Mayo	3	2	0	1	50	47	+3	4	Advance to preliminary quarter-final
4	Louth	3	0	0	3	44	75	−31	0	

Updated to match(es) played on 18 June 2023. Source: GAA
Notes:

20 May 2023 Round 1	Kerry	0–17 – 1–19	Mayo	Killarney
15:00 IST (UTC+1)	David Clifford 0–8 (0–3f), Seán O'Shea 0–3 (0–2f, 0–1 '45), Paul Geaney 0–3, Tom O'Sullivan 0–2, Dara Moynihan 0–1	Report	Ryan O'Donoghue 0–5 (0–2f), Aidan O'Shea 0–3 (0–2f, 0–1m), James Carr 0–3, Eoghan McLaughlin 1–0, Matthew Ruane 0–2, Pádraig O'Hora 0–1, Donnacha McHugh 0–1, Jason Doherty 0–1, Jack Carney 0–1, Jordan Flynn 0–1, Paddy Durcan 0–1	Stadium: Fitzgerald Stadium; Attendance: 23,128; Referee: Sean Hurson

27 May 2023 Round 1	Louth	1–17 – 1–19	Cork	Navan
15:00 IST (UTC+1)	Sam Mulroy 0–8 (0–4f), Liam Jackson 1–0, Ciarán Downey 0–2, Peter Lynch 0–1, Leonard Grey 0–1, Tommy Durnin 0–1, Conor Early 0–1, Craig Lennon 0–1, Dylan McKeown 0–1, Conor Grimes 0–1	Report	Brian Hurley 0–8 (0–6f), Brian O'Driscoll 1–1, Colm O'Callaghan 0–2, Ian Maguire 0–2, Killian O'Hanlon 0–1, Seán Powter 0–1, Chris Óg Jones 0–1, Steven Sherlock 0–1, Conor Corbett 0–1, John O'Rourke 0–1	Stadium: Páirc Tailteann; Referee: Martin McNally

3 June 2023 Round 2	Cork	0–15 – 1–14	Kerry	Cork
15:00 IST (UTC+1)	Brian Hurley 0–6 (0–5f, 0–1m), Seán Powter 0–2, Steven Sherlock 0–2, Eoghan McSweeney 0–2, Brian O'Driscoll 0–1, Killian O'Hanlon 0–1, Chris Óg Jones 0–1	Report	David Clifford 1–5 (1–0 pen, 0–1f), Seán O'Shea 0–5 (0–2f), Paudie Clifford 0–2, Tom O'Sullivan 0–1, Adrian Spillane 0–1	Stadium: Páirc Uí Chaoimh; Attendance: 14,081; Referee: David Gough

4 June 2023 Round 2	Mayo	0–14 – 1–10	Louth	Castlebar
14:00 IST (UTC+1)	Aidan O'Shea 0–4 (0–4f), Ryan O'Donoghue 0–3 (0–2f), Colm Reape 0–1 (0–1f), Stephen Coen 0–1, Matthew Ruane 0–1, Jordan Flynn 0–1, Jack Carney 0–1, Paddy Durcan 0–1, Fionn McDonagh 0–1	Report	Sam Mulroy 0–3 (0–3f), Conall McKeever 1–0, Ciarán Downey 0–2 (0–1m), Conor Grimes 0–2, Leonard Grey 0–1, Niall Sharkey 0–1, Conor Early 0–1	Stadium: Hastings Insurance MacHale Park; Attendance: 11,347; Referee: Noel Mooney

18 June 2023 Round 3	Kerry	5–24 – 0–11	Louth	Portlaoise
14:00 IST (UTC+1)	Seán O'Shea 1–8 (0–3f, 0–1m), David Clifford 2–4 (1–0 pen, 0–1m), Paudie Clifford 1–2, Tony Brosnan 0–3 (0–1m), Diarmuid O'Connor 0–3, Mike Breen 1–0, Tom O'Sullivan 0–2, Dara Moynihan 0–2	Report	Dylan McKeown 0–2 (0–1f), Ciarán Downey 0–2, Conor Grimes 0–2, Sam Mulroy 0–1 (0–1f), Niall Sharkey 0–1, Liam Jackson 0–1, Anthony Williams 0–1, Conor Early 0–1	Stadium: Laois Hire O'Moore Park; Referee: James Molloy

18 June 2023 Round 3	Mayo	1–11 – 1–14	Cork	Limerick
14:00 IST (UTC+1)	Ryan O'Donoghue 0–5 (0–4f), Jordan Flynn 0–4, Tommy Conroy 1–1, Colm Reape 0–1 (0–1 '45)	Report	Steven Sherlock 1–5 (1–0 pen, 0–1f, 0–1 '45), Brian Hurley 0–2 (0–1f), Rory Maguire 0–2, Colm O’Callaghan 0–1, Chris Óg Jones 0–1, John O’Rourke 0–1, Tommy Walsh 0–1, Eoghan McSweeney 0–1	Stadium: TUS Gaelic Grounds; Attendance: 9,210; Referee: Paul Faloon

=== Group 2 ===
Pos	Team	Pld	W	D	L	PF	PA	PD	Pts	Qualification
1	Armagh	3	2	0	1	43	43	0	4 (Note: Armagh are ranked ahead of Galway as they won the head-to-head game between the teams.)	Advance to quarter-final
2	Galway	3	2	0	1	51	41	+10	4	Advance to preliminary quarter-final
3	Tyrone	3	1	1	1	44	45	−1	3	Advance to preliminary quarter-final
4	Westmeath	3	0	1	2	45	54	−9	1	

Updated to match(es) played on 18 June 2023. Source: GAA
Notes:

20 May 2023 Round 1	Galway	0–16 – 0–13	Tyrone	Galway
17:15 IST (UTC+1)	Shane Walsh 0–6 (0–4f), Cillian McDaid 0–2, Paul Conroy 0–2, Peter Cooke 0–2, Matthew Tierney 0–1, Johnny Heaney 0–1, Damien Comer 0–1, Robert Finnerty 0–1	Report	Darren McCurry 0–7 (0–5f), Darragh Canavan 0–2 (0–2f), Conor Meyler 0–1, Cormac Quinn 0–1, Peter Harte 0–1, Mattie Donnelly 0–1	Stadium: Pearse Stadium; Referee: David Gough

27 May 2023 Round 1	Armagh	1–13 – 1–12	Westmeath	Armagh
16:45 IST (UTC+1)	Rían O'Neill 0–4 (0–3f), Rory Grugan 0–3 (0–2f), Andrew Murnin 0–3, Conor Turbitt 1–0, Stefan Campbell 0–2, Ciaran Mackin 0–1	Report	John Heslin 0–6 (0–4f), Ronan O'Toole 1–1, Luke Loughlin 0–2, David Lynch 0–1, Sam Duncan 0–1, Sam McCartan 0–1	Stadium: Box-It Athletic Grounds; Attendance: 10,842; Referee: Fergal Kelly

3 June 2023 Round 2	Westmeath	0–12 – 0–20	Galway	Mullingar
17:00 IST (UTC+1)	John Heslin 0–2 (0–1f), Ronan O'Toole 0–2, Luke Loughlin 0–2, Jack Smith 0–1, Ronan Wallace 0–1, Ray Connellan 0–1, Sam McCartan 0–1, Stephen Smith 0–1, Eoin Mulvihill 0–1	Report	Shane Walsh 0–4 (0–3f), Peter Cooke 0–4, Damien Comer 0–3, Johnny Heaney 0–2 (0–1m), Cian Hernon 0–2, Matthew Tierney 0–1 (0–1 '45), Paul Conroy 0–1, Cathal Sweeney 0–1, Ian Burke 0–1, John Maher 0–1	Stadium: TEG Cusack Park; Referee: Joe McQuillan (Cavan)

3 June 2023 Round 2	Tyrone	0–13 – 0–11	Armagh	Omagh
19:00 IST (UTC+1)	Darren McCurry 0–5 (0–2f), Darragh Canavan 0–3, Conn Kilpatrick 0–1 (0–1m), Michael McKernan 0–1, Pádraig Hampsey 0–1, Conor Meyler 0–1, Mattie Donnelly 0–1	Report	Rory Grugan 0–4 (0–2f), Oisín Conaty 0–2, Rian O'Neill 0–1 (0–1f), Jarly Óg Burns 0–1, Conor Turbitt 0–1, Andrew Murnin 0–1, Shane McPartlan 0–1	Stadium: O'Neills Healy Park; Referee: Martin McNally (Monaghan)

18 June 2023 Round 3	Galway	1–12 – 0–16	Armagh	Carrick-on-Shannon
16:00 IST (UTC+1)	Shane Walsh 0–5 (0–3f), Seán Kelly 1–1, Cillian McDaid 0–2, Matthew Tierney 0–2, Peter Cooke 0–2	Report	Rory Grugan 0–4 (0–3f), Conor Turbitt 0–4 (0–2f), Andrew Murnin 0–3 (0–1m), Aidan Forker 0–2, Stefan Campbell 0–2, Jason Duffy 0–1	Stadium: Avant Money Páirc Seán Mac Diarmada; Attendance: 6,803; Referee: Joe McQuillan

18 June 2023 Round 3	Tyrone	0–18 – 0–18	Westmeath	Cavan
16:00 IST (UTC+1)	Darragh Canavan 0–10 (0–6f), Ruairí Canavan 0–3 (0–1f), Peter Harte 0–1 (0–1f), Brian Kennedy 0–1, Conn Kilpatrick 0–1, Joe Oguz 0–1, Kieran McGeary 0–1	Report	John Heslin 0–8 (0–7f), Luke Loughlin 0–4 (0–2f), Sam McCartan 0–2, Ray Connellan 0–1, Ronan O'Toole 0–1, Senan Baker 0–1, Kieran Martin 0–1	Stadium: Kingspan Breffni; Referee: Noel Mooney

=== Group 3 ===
Pos	Team	Pld	W	D	L	PF	PA	PD	Pts	Qualification
1	Dublin	3	2	1	0	68	35	+33	5	Advance to quarter-final
2	Kildare	3	1	1	1	46	54	−8	3 (Note: Kildare are ranked ahead of Roscommon as they won the head-to-head game between the teams.)	Advance to preliminary quarter-final
3	Roscommon	3	1	1	1	56	47	+9	3	Advance to preliminary quarter-final
4	Sligo	3	0	1	2	36	70	−34	1	

Source: GAA
Notes:

21 May 2023 Round 1	Sligo	0–14 – 0–14	Kildare	Sligo
14:30 IST (UTC+1)	Niall Murphy 0–6 (0–2f), Seán Carrabine 0–4, Finnian Cawley 0–2, Darragh Cummins 0–1, David Quinn 0–1	Report	Paddy Woodgate 0–4 (0–1f, 0–1 '45), Darragh Kirwan 0–3, Kevin Flynn 0–2, Alex Beirne 0–2, Kevin Feely 0–1 (0–1m), Jack Robinson 0–1 (0–1f), Aaron Masterson 0–1	Stadium: Markievicz Park; Attendance: 2,933; Referee: Joe McQuillan

28 May 2023 Round 1	Dublin	1–11 – 0–14	Roscommon	Dublin
16:00 IST (UTC+1)	Cormac Costello 0–7 (0–2f, 0–2 '45), John Small 1–0, Seán Bugler 0–2, Con O'Callaghan 0–2	Report	Ciaráin Murtagh 0–5 (0–2f), Diarmuid Murtagh 0–3 (0–2f), Ciarán Lennon 0–2, Donie Smith 0–1 (0–1f), Conor Cox 0–1 (0–1f), Niall Daly 0–1, Enda Smith 0–1	Stadium: Croke Park; Attendance: 30,802; Referee: Barry Cassidy

3 June 2023 Round 2	Kildare	0–13 – 0–22	Dublin	Kilkenny
17:00 IST (UTC+1)	Neil Flynn 0–5 (0–1f), Ben McCormack 0–3, Paddy Woodgate 0–1 (0–1f), Kevin Feely 0–1 (0–1m), Kevin O'Callaghan 0–1, Aaron Masterson 0–1, Darragh Kirwan 0–1	Report	Colm Basquel 0–5, Dean Rock 0–4 (0–2f), Con O'Callaghan 0–4, Seán Bugler 0–3, Paul Mannion 0–2, Brian Fenton 0–1, Niall Scully 0–1, Killian O'Gara 0–1, Tom Lahiff 0–1	Stadium: UPMC Nowlan Park; Attendance: 8,216; Referee: Sean Hurson

4 June 2023 Round 2	Roscommon	1–21 – 1–11	Sligo	Roscommon
15:00 IST (UTC+1)	Diarmuid Murtagh 0–6 (0–4f), Enda Smith 0–5, Dylan Ruane 1–1, Cian McKeon 0–3, Ciaráin Murtagh 0–2 (0–1f), Donie Smith 0–2, Ben O’Carroll 0–1, Colin Walsh 0–1	Report	Alan Reilly 1–3, Niall Murphy 0–4 (2fs), Seán Carrabine 0–3, Nathan Mullen 0–1	Stadium: Dr Hyde Park; Attendance: 5,773; Referee: Conor Lane (Cork)

18 June 2023 Round 3	Dublin	3–23 – 0–8	Sligo	Cavan
13:45 IST (UTC+1)	Con O'Callaghan 1–5, Colm Basquel 1–3 (0–1f), Paddy Small 0–5 (0–3f), Lee Gannon 0–3, Eoin Murchan 1–0, Seán Bugler 0–2, Paul Mannion 0–2, Brian Howard 0–1, John Small 0–1, Ciarán Kilkenny 0–1	Report	Sean Carrabine 0–4 (0–2f, 0–1 '45), Niall Murphy 0–2, Darragh Cummins 0–1, Patrick O'Connor 0–1	Stadium: Kingspan Breffni; Referee: Niall Cullen

18 June 2023 Round 3	Roscommon	1–15 – 1–16	Kildare	Tullamore
13:45 IST (UTC+1)	Enda Smith 1–3, Ciaráin Murtagh 0–4 (0–3f), Cian McKeon 0–3 (0–1m), Donie Smith 0–1 (0–1f), Diarmuid Murtagh 0–1 (0–1f), Dylan Ruane 0–1, Niall Daly 0–1, Ben O'Carroll 0–1	Report	Alex Beirne 1–2, Kevin Feely 0–4 (0–3m, 0–1f), Neil Flynn 0–4 (0–3f), Ben McCormack 0–3, Daniel Flynn 0–1 (0–1m), Kevin O'Callaghan 0–1, Darragh Kirwan 0–1	Stadium: Glenisk O'Connor Park; Attendance: 7,000; Referee: Martin McNally

=== Group 4 ===
Pos	Team	Pld	W	D	L	PF	PA	PD	Pts	Qualification
1	Derry	3	2	1	0	59	48	+11	5	Advance to quarter-final
2	Donegal	3	2	0	1	51	49	+2	4	Advance to preliminary quarter-final
3	Monaghan	3	1	1	1	57	54	+3	3	Advance to preliminary quarter-final
4	Clare	3	0	0	3	46	62	−16	0	

Updated to match(es) played on 17 June 2023. Source: GAA

20 May 2023 Round 1	Clare	0–9 – 0–14	Donegal	Ennis
14:00 IST (UTC+1)	Eoin Cleary 0–2 (0–2f), Emmet McMahon 0–2 (0–1f), Pearse Lillis 0–2, Keelan Sexton 0–1, Darragh Bohannon 0–1, Aaron Griffin 0–1	Report	Ciarán Thompson 0–4, Oisín Gallen 0–4, Caolan McGonagle 0–2, Eoghan Bán Gallagher 0–1, Hugh McFadden 0–1, Luke McGlynn 0–1, Rory O'Donnell 0–1	Stadium: Cusack Park; Attendance: 2,296; Referee: James Molloy

27 May 2023 Round 1	Derry	0–14 – 0–14	Monaghan	Derry
19:00 IST (UTC+1)	Shane McGuigan 0–9 (0–6f, 0–1m), Niall Toner 0–2 (0–1f), Ethan Doherty 0–1, Ciaran McFaul 0–1, Lachlan Murray 0–1	Report	Conor McCarthy 0–3 (0–1f), Micheál Bannigan 0–3 (0–1f), Rory Beggan 0–2 (0–2f), Shane Carey 0–2, Ryan Wylie 0–1, Karl O'Connell 0–1, Conor Boyle 0–1, Gary Mohan 0–1	Stadium: Celtic Park; Referee: Noel Mooney

4 June 2023 Round 2	Monaghan	1–23 – 1–18	Clare	Clones
14:00 IST (UTC+1)	Jack McCarron 0–9 (0–1f), Conor McCarthy 1–2, Micheál Bannigan 0–3 (0–1f), Conor McManus 0–2 (0–1f), Karl O'Connell 0–2, Rory Beggan 0–1 (0–1 '45), Ryan O'Toole 0–1, Gary Mohan 0–1, Stephen O'Hanlon 0–1, Karl Gallagher 0–1	Report	Emmet McMahon 0–6 (0–5f), Darragh Bohannon 1–1, Keelan Sexton 0–3 (0–1f), Cathal O'Connor 0–3, Mark McInerney 0–2 (0–1f), Jamie Malone 0–2, Daniel Walsh 0–1	Stadium: St Tiernach's Park; Referee: Niall Cullen

4 June 2023 Round 2	Donegal	1–15 – 3–14	Derry	Ballybofey
16:00 IST (UTC+1)	Oisín Gallen 0–9 (0–3f, 0–3m), Rory O'Donnell 1–0, Ciarán Thompson 0–2 (0–1f), Conor O'Donnell 0–2, Shaun Patton 0–1 (0–1 '45), Patrick McBrearty 0–1	Report	Paul Cassidy 0–4, Shane McGuigan 0–3 (0–1f), Conor Doherty 1–0, Lachlan Murray 1–0, Padraig McGrogan 1–0, Brendan Rogers 0–2, Ciaran McFaul 0–2, Niall Toner 0–1 (0–1f), Conor Glass 0–1, Benny Heron 0–1	Stadium: MacCumhaill Park; Attendance: 8,253; Referee: Brendan Cawley

17 June 2023 Round 3	Derry	1–19 – 1–13	Clare	Longford
18:00 IST (UTC+1)	Shane McGuigan 0–9 (0–4f), Niall Loughlin 0–4 (0–1f)– Benny Heron 1–0, Paul Cassidy 0–2, Odhrán Lynch 0–2, Gareth McKinless 0–2, Ethan Doherty 0–1	Report	Emmet McMahon 1–6 (0–6f), Jamie Malone 0–3 (0–1f), Darragh Bohannon 0–1, Daniel Walsh 0–1, Micheál Garry 0–1, Mark McInerney 0–1	Stadium: Glennon Brothers Pearse Park; Referee: Sean Hurson

17 June 2023 Round 3	Monaghan	0–17 – 0–19	Donegal	Omagh
18:00 IST (UTC+1)	Jack McCarron 0–5 (0–3f, 0–1m), Gary Mohan 0–3 (0–1m), Conor Boyle 0–2, Micheál Bannigan 0–2, Darren Hughes 0–2, Conor McManus 0–1 (0–1f), Stephen O'Hanlon 0–1, Ryan McAnespie 0–1	Report	Oisín Gallen 0–5 (0–3f), Ciarán Thompson 0–3 (0–1f), Daire Ó Baoill 0–3, Conor O'Donnell 0–3, Jamie Brennan 0–2 (0–1f), Shaun Patton 0–1 (0–1f), Caolan McGonagle 0–1, Odhran Doherty 0–1	Stadium: O'Neills Healy Park; Referee: Liam Devenney

== Knockout stage ==
=== Bracket ===
Preliminary quarter-finals
Galway	0–12
Mayo	1–10
Kildare	0–13
Monaghan	1–11
Donegal	0–13
Tyrone	1–18
Cork	1–14
Roscommon	0–16

Quarter-finals
Dublin	2–17
Mayo	0–11
Armagh	0–14 (8)
Monaghan	0–14 (9)
Kerry	2–17
Tyrone	0–12
Derry	1–12
Cork	1–8

Semi-finals
Dublin	1–17
Monaghan	0–13
Kerry	1–17
Derry	1–15

Final
Dublin	1–15
Kerry	1–13

=== Preliminary quarter-finals ===
24 June 2023 Preliminary quarter-final	Cork	1–14 – 0–16	Roscommon	Cork
14:00 IST (UTC+1)	Steven Sherlock 0–5 (0–4f), Conor Corbett 1–0, Rory Maguire 0–2, Chris Óg Jones 0–2, Tommy Walsh 0–1, Luke Fahy 0–1, Matty Taylor 0–1, Brian O'Driscoll 0–1, Kevin O'Donovan 0–1	Report	Diarmuid Murtagh 0–6 (0–3f), Ciaráin Murtagh 0–5 (0–3f), Daire Cregg 0–2 (0–1m), Enda Smith 0–2, Conor Carroll 0–1 (0–1 '45)	Stadium: Páirc Uí Chaoimh; Attendance: 14,294; Referee: Brendan Cawley

24 June 2023 Preliminary quarter-final	Kildare	0–13 – 1–11	Monaghan	Tullamore
16:45 IST (UTC+1)	Neil Flynn 0–5 (0–3f, 0–1 '45), Ben McCormack 0–4 (0–1m), Alex Beirne 0–2, Kevin Flynn 0–1, Darragh Kirwan 0–1	Report	Conor McCarthy 1–2, Micheál Bannigan 0–3 (0–2f), Jack McCarron 0–3 (0–1f), Rory Beggan 0–1 (0–1f), Gary Mohan 0–1 (0–1m), Darren Hughes 0–1 (0–1m)	Stadium: Glenisk O'Connor Park; Attendance: 7,893; Referee: Jerome Henry

24 June 2023 Preliminary quarter-final	Donegal	0–13 – 1–18	Tyrone	Ballybofey
19:00 IST (UTC+1)	Oisín Gallen 0–4 (0–1f), Paddy McBrearty 0–3 (0–2f), Ciarán Thompson 0–2, Shaun Patton 0–1 (0–1 '45), Caolan McColgan 0–1, Odhran Doherty 0–1, Luke McGlynn 0–1	Report	Darren McCurry 0–5 (0–4f), Darragh Canavan 0–5 (0–1f), Ruairí Canavan 1–1, Mattie Donnelly 0–3, Michael McKernan 0–2, Brian Kennedy 0–1, Conn Kilpatrick 0–1	Stadium: MacCumhaill Park; Attendance: 11,971; Referee: Conor Lane

25 June 2023 Preliminary quarter-final	Galway	0–12 – 1–10	Mayo	Galway
15:00 IST (UTC+1)	Shane Walsh 0–4 (0–4f), Matthew Tierney 0–2 (0–1f), John Maher 0–2, Paul Conroy 0–1, Cillian McDaid 0–1, Peter Cooke 0–1, Damien Comer 0–1	Report	Ryan O'Donoghue 0–3 (0–1f), David McBrien 1–0, Paddy Durcan 0–2, Tommy Conroy 0–2, Stephen Coen 0–1, Kevin McLoughlin 0–1, Cillian O'Connor 0–1	Stadium: Pearse Stadium; Attendance: 23,897; Referee: Sean Hurson

=== Quarter-finals ===
1 July 2023 Quarter-final	Kerry	2–18 – 0–12	Tyrone	Dublin
15:45 IST (UTC+1)	Seán O'Shea 1–5 (0–2f), David Clifford 0–5 (0–3f, 0–1m), Diarmuid O'Connor 1–2, Adrian Spillane 0–2, Paul Geaney 0–1, Paudie Clifford 0–1, Tom O'Sullivan 0–1, Stephen O'Brien 0–1	Report	Darren McCurry 0–4 (0–4f), Darragh Canavan 0–2, Ruairí Canavan 0–2, Cathal McShane 0–2, Michael McKernan 0–1, Mattie Donnelly 0–1	Stadium: Croke Park; Attendance: 57,570; Referee: Brendan Cawley

1 July 2023 Quarter-final	Armagh	0–14 – 0–14 (a.e.t.) (8–9 p)	Monaghan	Dublin
18:00 IST (UTC+1)	Rían O'Neill 0–6 (0–4f, 0–1 '45), Andrew Murnin 0–3 (0–1m), Rory Grugan 0–2 (0–1f), Aidan Forker 0–2, Ross McQuillan 0–1	Report	Conor McManus 0–4 (0–3f), Conor McCarthy 0–3, Gary Mohan 0–3, Jack McCarron 0–2 (0–1f), Micheál Bannigan 0–2	Stadium: Croke Park; Attendance: 57,570; Referee: Conor Lane
	Penalties
	Rían O'Neill; Shane McPartlan; Callum Cumiskey; Oisín Conaty; Rory Grugan; Rían O'Neill; Shane McPartlan; Oisín Conaty; Rory Grugan; Callum Cumiskey		Conor McManus; Jack McCarron; Kieran Hughes; Micheál Bannigan; Gary Mohan; Conor McManus; Jack McCarron; Kieran Hughes; Micheál Bannigan; Gary Mohan

2 July 2023 Quarter-final	Derry	1–12 – 1–8	Cork	Dublin
13:45 IST (UTC+1)	Shane McGuigan 0–4 (0–4f), Conor Doherty 1–0, Brendan Rogers 0–2, Paul Cassidy 0–2, Ethan Doherty 0–2, Ciaran McFaul 0–1, Niall Loughlin 0–1	Report	Rory Maguire 1–0, Steven Sherlock 0–2 (0–1f, 0–1 '45), Colm O'Callaghan 0–2, Kevin O'Donovan 0–1, Ruairi Deane 0–1, Eoghan McSweeney 0–1, Chris Óg Jones 0–1	Stadium: Croke Park; Attendance: 82,300; Referee: Joe McQuillan

2 July 2023 Quarter-final	Dublin	2–17 – 0–11	Mayo	Dublin
16:00 IST (UTC+1)	Colm Basquel 2–2, Cormac Costello 0–5 (0–3f), James McCarthy 0–2, Paul Mannion 0–2, Con O'Callaghan 0–2, Brian Fenton 0–1, Ciarán Kilkenny 0–1, Paddy Small 0–1, Dean Rock 0–1	Report	Ryan O'Donoghue 0–5 (0–2f), Tommy Conroy 0–2, Aidan O'Shea 0–1 (0–1f), Colm Reape 0–1 (0–1 '45), Paddy Durcan 0–1, Jordan Flynn 0–1	Stadium: Croke Park; Attendance: 82,300; Referee: David Gough

=== Semi-finals ===
15 July 2023 Semi-final	Dublin	1–17 – 0–13	Monaghan	Dublin
17:30 IST (UTC+1)	Cormac Costello 0–7 (0–3f 0–1m), Dean Rock 1–1 (0–1f), Paul Mannion 0–2 (0–1m), Con O'Callaghan 0–2, Brian Fenton 0–2, Jack McCaffrey 0–1, Paddy Small 0–1, Lee Gannon 0–1	Report	Conor McManus 0–5 (0–2f, 0–1m), Rory Beggan 0–3 (0–3 '45), Gary Mohan 0–1, Micheál Bannigan 0–1, Stephen O'Hanlon 0–1, Ryan McAnespie 0–1, Jack McCarron 0–1	Stadium: Croke Park; Attendance: 82,000; Referee: Sean Hurson (Tyrone)

16 July 2023 Semi-final	Kerry	1–17 – 1–15	Derry	Dublin
16:00 IST (UTC+1)	David Clifford 0–9 (0–4f, 0–1m), Seán O'Shea 0–4 (0–1f), Gavin White 1–0, Paudie Clifford 0–1, Diarmuid O'Connor 0–1, Shane Ryan 0–1, Stephen O'Brien 0–1	Report	Shane McGuigan 0–6 (0–3f), Gareth McKinless 1–0, Brendan Rogers 0–2, Paul Cassidy 0–2, Ciaran McFaul 0–2, Padraig McGrogan 0–1, Odhrán Lynch 0–1, Conor Doherty 0–1	Stadium: Croke Park; Attendance: 43,192; Referee: Joe McQuillan (Cavan)

=== Final ===
RTÉ
BBC

30 July 2023
15:30 IST (UTC+1)
Final

Report

Dublin	1–15 – 1–13	Kerry
(HT: 0–6 – 1–4)
Gls: Paddy Small 1 Pts: Paul Mannion 5 (1f), Paddy Small 1, Colm Basquel 2, Stephen Cluxton 2 (1 '45, 1f), Brian Fenton 2, Brian Howard 1, Cormac Costello 1 (1f), Dean Rock 1 (1f)		Gls: Paul Geaney 1 Pts: Seán O'Shea 5 (4f), Paul Geaney 1, David Clifford 3 (1f), Paudie Clifford 3, Killian Spillane 1

Croke Park, Dublin
Referee: David Gough (Meath)
Attendance: 82,300
Standby: Martin McNally (Monaghan)
Linesman: James Molloy (Galway)
Sideline: Fergal Kelly (Longford)
Umpires: Dean Gough, Eugene Gough, Stephen Gough, Terry Gough (Slane)

== Incidents ==
=== Armagh v Monaghan quarter-final ===
During the All-Ireland quarter-final clash between Armagh and Monaghan, Gardaí arrested seven people and 15 fans were ejected from Croke Park after a fight broke out on Hill 16 before the penalty shoot-out. Video footage later emerged on social media showing blows being exchanged between Armagh and Monaghan fans and some of those involved being knocked to the ground. The footage was condemned by the GAA, saying it represented "unacceptable behaviour from a small number of supporters", warning fans that Hill 16 could be converted to seats if fighting in the terraced stand continued.

Earlier in the match, the Hawk-Eye score detection system malfunctioned again after it returned a 'data unavailable' message. The GAA requested an explanation from Hawk-Eye who concluded that the message was a result of operator error. The next day the GAA took the decision to stand down Hawk-Eye once again.

== Stadia and locations ==
County	Location	Province	Stadium	Capacity
Antrim	Belfast	Ulster	Corrigan Park	3,700
Armagh	Armagh	Ulster	Athletic Grounds	18,500
Carlow	Carlow	Leinster	Dr Cullen Park	21,000
Cavan	Cavan	Ulster	Breffni Park	25,030
Clare	Ennis	Munster	Cusack Park	19,000
Cork	Cork	Munster	Páirc Uí Chaoimh	45,000
Derry	Derry	Ulster	Celtic Park	18,500
Donegal	Ballybofey	Ulster	MacCumhaill Park	18,000
Down	Newry	Ulster	Páirc Esler	20,000
Dublin	Dublin	Leinster	Croke Park	82,300
Fermanagh	Enniskillen	Ulster	Brewster Park	20,000
Galway	Galway	Connacht	Pearse Stadium	26,197
Kerry	Killarney	Munster	Fitzgerald Stadium	38,000
Kildare (Note: Kildare's usual home venue, St. Conleth's Park in Newbridge, was under redevelopment.)	Kilkenny	Leinster	Nowlan Park	27,000
Kildare	Tullamore	Leinster	O'Connor Park	18,000
Laois	Portlaoise	Leinster	O'Moore Park	22,000
Leitrim	Carrick-on-Shannon	Connacht	Páirc Seán Mac Diarmada	9,331
Limerick	Limerick	Munster	Gaelic Grounds	44,023
London	South Ruislip	Britain	McGovern Park	3,000
Longford	Longford	Leinster	Pearse Park	10,000
Louth	Drogheda	Leinster	Drogheda Park	3,500
Mayo	Castlebar	Connacht	MacHale Park	25,369
Meath	Navan	Leinster	Páirc Tailteann	11,000
Monaghan	Clones	Ulster	St Tiernach's Park	29,000
New York	Bronx	North America	Gaelic Park	2,000
Offaly	Tullamore	Leinster	O'Connor Park	18,000
Roscommon	Roscommon	Connacht	Dr Hyde Park	18,890
Sligo	Sligo	Connacht	Markievicz Park	18,558
Tipperary	Thurles	Munster	Semple Stadium	45,690
Tyrone	Omagh	Ulster	Healy Park	17,636
Waterford	Waterford	Munster	Fraher Field	15,000
Westmeath	Mullingar	Leinster	Cusack Park	11,000
Wexford	Wexford	Leinster	Chadwicks Wexford Park	18,000
Wicklow	Aughrim	Leinster	Aughrim County Ground	7,000

== Statistics ==
=== Top scorers ===
==== Top scorer overall ====
Rank	Player	County	Tally	Total	Matches	Average
1	Shane McGuigan	Derry	2–52	58	7	7.42
2	David Clifford	Kerry	5–39	54	8	6.75

=== Scoring events ===
Does not include extra time.

- Widest winning margin: 28 points
  - Kerry 5–24 – 0–11 Louth (All Ireland SFC group stage)
- Most goals in a match: 6
  - Dublin 4–30 – 2-09 Laois (Leinster SFC)
- Most points in a match: 41
  - Monaghan 1–23 — 1–18 Clare (All Ireland SFC group stage)
- Most goals by one team in a match: 5
  - Kerry 5–14 – 0–15 Clare (Munster SFC)
  - Dublin 5–21 – 0–15 Louth (Leinster SFC)
  - Kerry 5–24 – 0–11 Louth (All Ireland SFC group stage)
- Most points by one team in a match: 30
  - Dublin 4–30 – 2-09 Laois (Leinster SFC)
- Highest aggregate score: 57 points
  - Dublin 4–30 – 2-09 Laois (Leinster SFC)
- Lowest aggregate score: 23 points
  - Clare 0-09 — 0–14 Donegal (All Ireland SFC group stage)

=== Miscellaneous ===
- First-time championship meetings:
  - Monaghan vs Clare (All-Ireland group stage)
- New York won their first ever Connacht Senior Football Championship game.
- Armagh and Antrim meet in the Ulster Senior Football Championship for first time since 1982.
- Clare beat Cork for the first time since 1997.
- Derry retain the Ulster Senior Football Championship for first time since 1976.
- Sligo qualify to their first Connacht final since 2015.
- Clare qualify to their first Munster final since 2012.
- It's the first Leinster final between Dublin and Louth since 1958. Dublin make it 13 Leinster titles in a row.
- Limerick and Meath enter the Tailteann Cup for the first time.
- Kerry are defeated at Fitzgerald Stadium in the championship for the first time since the Munster Final of 1995, ending an unbeaten record of 39 championship games. This occurred in a five-point defeat to Mayo.
- Armagh beat Galway for the first time ever in the championship.
- This is the first time since the 2015 championship that 4 Ulster counties reached the quarterfinals.
- Galway were provincial champions but failed to reach the quarter-finals, the first time this has happened and the first season that such an outcome was possible.
- It's the first championship meeting between Derry and Kerry since the 2004 championship.

== See also ==
- 2023 Connacht Senior Football Championship
- 2023 Leinster Senior Football Championship
- 2023 Munster Senior Football Championship
- 2023 Ulster Senior Football Championship
- 2023 Tailteann Cup (Tier 2)
- 2023 All-Ireland Junior Football Championship (Tier 3)
