= 2024 Munster Senior Football Championship =

Sports tournament

2024 Munster SFC
Tournament details
- Year: 2024

Winners
- Champions: Kerry (85th win)
- Manager: Jack O'Connor

Runners-up
- Runners-up: Clare

The 2024 Munster Senior Football Championship was the 2024 installment of the annual Munster Senior Football Championship organised by the Munster GAA. Kerry were defending champions.

== Draw ==
Clare and Kerry, finalists from the 2023 championship, received a bye to the semi-finals.

Seeded	Unseeded
Kerry (1st) Clare (2nd)	Limerick (SF) Tipperary (SF) Cork (QF) Waterford (QF)

== Teams ==
=== General Information ===
Six counties competed in the Munster Senior Football Championship:

County	Last Championship Title	Last All-Ireland Title	Position in 2023 Championship
Clare	1992	—	Runners-up
Cork	2012	2010	Quarter-finals
Kerry	2023	2022	Champions
Limerick	1896	1896	Semi-finals
Tipperary	2020	1920	Semi-finals
Waterford	1898	—	Quarter-finals

=== Personnel and kits ===
County	Manager	Captain(s)	Sponsors
Clare	Mark Fitzgerald	Eoin Cleary	Pat O'Donnell
Cork	John Cleary	Ian Maguire	Sports Direct
Kerry	Jack O'Connor	Jack Moloney	Kerry Group
Limerick	Jimmy Lee		None
Tipperary	Paul Kelly	Conor Sweeney	Fiserv
Waterford	Paul Shankey	Dermot Ryan	Cognizant

== Bracket ==
Quarter-finals

Semi-finals

Final

Waterford
1-09

Clare
2-20

Waterford
2-07

Tipperary
1-05

Clare
1-13

Kerry
0-23

Cork
3-13

Limerick
0-11

Kerry
0-18

Cork
1-12

- Kerry and Clare were seeded through to thesemi-finals as they were the previous year's finalists in the Munster Senior Football Championship.

== Quarter-finals ==
=== Matches ===
7 April 2024
14:00
Quarter-final

Waterford	2-07 - 1-05	Tipperary
O'Connell 2-3(3f), S Curry 0-3, J Curry 0-1(1f)	Report	Stokes 1-0, Grogan 0-1, Quigley 0-1, McGarry 0-1, Sweenwy 0-1, Doyle 0-1

Fraher Field, Dungarvan
Attendance: 1,071
Referee: Brendan Griffin (Kerry)
7 April 2024
14:00
Quarter-final

Cork	3-13 - 0-11	Limerick
Jones 1-2, Hurley 0-4(3f) Maguire 1-0, Deane 1-0, Fahy 0-2, O'Maholy 0-1, Taylor 0-1, O'Driscoll 0-1, Corbett 0-1, Sherlock 0-1	Report	Naughton 0-4(1f, 2 '45), Rigter 0-2, T Childs 0-1, Nix 0-1, Nash 0-1(1f), B Childs 0-1, Costello 0-1(1m)

Páirc Uí Chaoimh, Cork
Attendance: 4,062
Referee: Fergal Kelly (Longford)

== Semi-finals ==
=== Matches ===
20 April 2024
Semi-final

Waterford	1-09 - 2-20	Clare
Tom O'Connell 1-1 (1f), Alan Dunwoody 0-3 (2fs), Jason Curry 0-2 (1f), Ross Browne 0-1, Robbie McGrath 0-1, Seán Whelan-Barrett 0-1	Report	Emmet McMahon 1-3 (1f), Mark McInerney 1-2 (1f), Aaron Griffin 0-5, Ciarán Downes 0-4 (1 45'), Darragh Bohannon 0-2, Diarmuid O'Donnell 0-2, Gavin Murray 0-1, Dermot Coughlan 0-1

Fraher Field, Dungarvan
Attendance: 1,504
Referee: David Murnane (Cork)
20 April 2024
Semi-final

Kerry	0-18 - 1-12	Cork
Seán O'Shea 0-6 (3fs), David Clifford 0-4 (1f), Tom O’Sullivan 0-3, Dara Moynihan 0-2, Graham O'Sullivan 0-1, Cillian Burke 0-1, Paul Geaney 0-1	Report	Brian Hurley 0-8 (4fs), Paul Walsh 1-0, Conor Corbett 0-2 (1m), Matty Taylor 0-1, Chris Óg Jones 0-1

Fitzgerald Stadium, Killarney
Attendance: 17,568
Referee: Noel Mooney (Cavan)

== Final ==
=== Munster final ===
5 May 2024
13:45

Clare	1–13 – 0–23	Kerry

Cusack Park, Ennis
Attendance: 12,059
Referee: Fergal Kelly (Longford)
- Clare and Kerry qualify to the 2024 All-Ireland Senior Football Championship group stage.

== Stadia and Attendance ==
County	Location	Province	Stadium	Capacity
Clare	Ennis	Munster	Cusack Park	20,100
Cork	Cork	Munster	Páirc Uí Chaoimh	45,000
Kerry	Killarney	Munster	Fitzgerald Stadium	38,000
Limerick	Limerick	Munster	Gaelic Grounds	44,023
Tipperary	Thurles	Munster	Semple Stadium	45,690
Waterford	Waterford	Munster	Fraher Field	15,000

Total attendance	36,264
Average attendance	7,253
Highest attendance	17,568; Kerry 0-18 - 1-12 Cork; 20 April 2024

== Statistics ==
=== Scoring events ===
- Most points — 23
  - Clare 1-13 - 0-23 Kerry (Final)
- Most goals — 3
  - Cork 3-13 - 0-11 Limerick (quarter-final)
- Biggest win — 14
  - Waterford 1-09 - 2-20 Clare (semi-final)
- Highest scoring — 39
  - Clare 1-13 - 0-23 Kerry (Final)
- Lowest scoring — 21
  - Waterford 2-07 - 1-05 Tipperary (quarter-final)
- Most points in a match — 36
  - Clare 1-13 - 0-23 Kerry (Final)
- Most goals in a match — 3
  - Waterford 2-07 - 1-05 Tipperary (quarter-final)
  - Cork 3-13 - 0-11 Limerick (quarter-final)
  - Waterford 1-09 - 2-20 Clare (semi-final)

== Miscellaneous ==
- Clare appear in consecutive Munster finals for the first time since 1937.

== See also ==
- 2024 All-Ireland Senior Football Championship
- 2024 Connacht Senior Football Championship
- 2024 Leinster Senior Football Championship
- 2024 Ulster Senior Football Championship
- 2024 Tailteann Cup (Tier 2)
- 2024 All-Ireland Junior Football Championship (Tier 3)
