= 2023 Munster Senior Football Championship =

Sports tournament

2023 Munster SFC
Tournament details
- Year: 2023

Winners
- Champions: Kerry (84th win)
- Manager: Jack O'Connor
- Captain: David Clifford

Runners-up
- Runners-up: Clare
- Manager: Colm Collins

The 2023 Munster Senior Football Championship was the 2023 installment of the annual Munster Senior Football Championship organised by the Munster GAA. Kerry were defending champions.

== Draw ==
Limerick and Kerry, finalists from the 2022 championship, received a bye to the semi-finals.

Seeded	Unseeded
Kerry (1st) Limerick (2nd)	Cork (SF) Tipperary (SF) Clare (QF) Waterford (QF)

== Teams ==
=== General Information ===
Six counties will compete in the Munster Senior Football Championship:

County	Last Championship Title	Last All-Ireland Title	Position in 2022 Championship
Clare	1992	—	Quarter-finals
Cork	2012	2010	Semi-finals
Kerry	2022	2022	Champions
Limerick	1896	1896	Runners-up
Tipperary	2020	1920	Semi-finals
Waterford	1898	—	Quarter-finals

=== Personnel and kits ===
County	Manager	Captain(s)	Sponsors
Clare	Colm Collins	Eoin Cleary	Pat O’Donnell
Cork	John Cleary	Brian Hurley	Sports Direct
Kerry	Jack O'Connor	David Clifford	Kerry Group
Limerick	Mark Fitzgerald		None
Tipperary	David Power	Conor Sweeney	Fiserv
Waterford	Ephie Fitzgerald	Dermot Ryan	Cognizant

== Bracket ==
Quarter-finals

Semi-finals

Final

Clare
1-16

Limerick
0-16

Cork
0-13

Clare
0-14

Clare
0-15

Kerry
5-14

Tipperary
3-09

Waterford
1-11

Tipperary
0-05

Kerry
0-25

== Quarter-finals ==
9 April 2023; Quarter-final	Clare	0-14 - 0-13	Cork	Cusack Park, Ennis; Attendance: 3,661; Referee: Fergal Kelly (Longford)
9 April 2023; Quarter-final	Keelan Sexton and Eoin Cleary (1f) 0-4 each, Emmet McMahon 0-2, Jamie Malone, Padraic Collins, Gavin Cooney, and Cillian Rouine 0-1 each.	Report	Steven Sherlock 0-10 (7fs, 145), Sean Powter, Rory Maguire, and Kevin O'Donovan 0-1 each.	Cusack Park, Ennis; Attendance: 3,661; Referee: Fergal Kelly (Longford)

9 April 2023; Quarter-final	Tipperary	3-09 - 1-11	Waterford	Semple Stadium, Thurles; Attendance: 1,443; Referee: James Molloy (Galway)
9 April 2023; Quarter-final	Steven O'Brien 1-3, Stephen Quirke 1-1, Sean O'Connor 0-2, Jack Kennedy 0-2, Paudie Feehan 1-0, Colman Kennedy 0-1	Report	Darragh Corcoran 1-4, Jason Curry 0-5, Dermot Ryan 0-2	Semple Stadium, Thurles; Attendance: 1,443; Referee: James Molloy (Galway)

== Semi-finals ==
22 April 2023; 7:00pm Semi-final	Limerick	0-15 - 1-15	Clare	Gaelic Grounds, Limerick; Attendance: 3,616; Referee: Liam Devanney (Mayo)
22 April 2023; 7:00pm Semi-final		Report		Gaelic Grounds, Limerick; Attendance: 3,616; Referee: Liam Devanney (Mayo)

22 April 2023; 4:00pm Semi-final	Kerry	0-25 - 0-05	Tipperary	Fitzgerald Stadium, Killarney; Attendance: 6,939; Referee: Conor Lane (Cork)
22 April 2023; 4:00pm Semi-final		Report		Fitzgerald Stadium, Killarney; Attendance: 6,939; Referee: Conor Lane (Cork)

== Final ==
7 May 2023

Kerry	5-14 - 0-15	Clare
David Clifford 2-6 (0-4f); Dara Moynihan, Tony Brosnan 1-1 each; Paudie Clifford 1-0; Seán O’Shea 0-2 (1 45); Dylan Casey, Gavin White, Paul Geaney, Killian Spillane 0-1 each.	Report	Eoin Cleary 0-6 (4f); Emmet McMahon 0-4 (2f); Stephen Ryan (2f), Keelan Sexton 0-2; Ciarán Russell 0-1.

Gaelic Grounds, Limerick
Attendance: 12,499
Referee: Jerome Henry (Mayo)

== Stadia and Attendance ==
County	Location	Province	Stadium	Capacity
Clare	Ennis	Munster	Cusack Park	19,000
Cork	Cork	Munster	Páirc Uí Chaoimh	45,000
Kerry	Tralee	Munster	Fitzgerald Stadium	38,000
Limerick	Limerick	Munster	Gaelic Grounds	44,023
Tipperary	Thurles	Munster	Semple Stadium	45,690
Waterford	Waterford	Munster	Fraher Field	15,000

Total attendance	28,158
Average attendance	5,632
Highest attendance	12,499; Kerry 5-14 - 0-15 Clare; 7 May 2023

== Statistics ==
=== Scoring events ===
- Widest winning margin: 20 points
  - Kerry 0-25 - 0-05 Tipperary (Semi-finals)
- Most goals in a match: 5
  - Kerry 5-14 - 0-15 Clare (Final)
- Most points in a match: 30
  - Kerry 0-25 - 0-05 Tipperary (Semi-finals)
  - Limerick 0-15 - 1-15 Clare (Semi-finals)
- Most goals by one team in a match: 5
  - Kerry 5-14 - 0-15 Clare (Final)
- Most points by one team in a match: 25
  - Kerry 0-25 - 0-05 Tipperary (Semi-finals)
- Highest aggregate score: 44 points
  - Kerry 5-14 - 0-15 Clare (Final)
- Lowest aggregate score: 27 points
  - Clare 0-14 - 0-13 Cork (Quarter-finals)

== Miscellaneous ==
- Clare beat Cork for the first time since 1997.
- Clare qualified for their first Munster final since 2012.
- It was the first Munster final between Clare and Kerry since 2000 which Kerry won by 3-15 to 0-8.

== See also ==
- 2023 All-Ireland Senior Football Championship
- 2023 Connacht Senior Football Championship
- 2023 Leinster Senior Football Championship
- 2023 Ulster Senior Football Championship
- 2023 Tailteann Cup (Tier 2)
- 2023 All-Ireland Junior Football Championship (Tier 3)
