= 2025 Munster Senior Football Championship =

Gaelic football tournament

2025 Munster SFC
Tournament details
- Province: Munster
- Year: 2025
- Trophy: Munster Cup
- Date: April – May 2025
- Defending champions: Kerry

Winners
- Champions: Kerry (86th win)

Runners-up
- Runners-up: Clare

The 2025 Munster Senior Football Championship was the 2025 installment of the annual Munster Senior Football Championship organised by Munster GAA. It was one of the four provincial competitions of the 2025 All-Ireland Senior Football Championship. The winning team received the Munster Cup. The draw for the championship was made on 12 October 2024. The defending champion was Kerry and they went on to retain the title.

== Draw ==
Seeded	Unseeded
Kerry (1st) Clare (2nd)	Limerick (QF) Tipperary (QF) Cork (SF) Waterford (SF)

== Teams ==
=== General information ===
Six counties competed in the Munster Senior Football Championship:

County	Last Championship title	Last All-Ireland title	Position in 2024 Championship
Clare	1992	—	Runners-up
Cork	2012	2010	Semi-finals
Kerry	2024	2022	Champions
Limerick	1896	1896	Quarter-finals
Tipperary	2020	1920	Quarter-finals
Waterford	1898	—	Semi-finals

=== Personnel and kits ===
County	Manager	Captain(s)	Sponsors
Clare	Peter Keane	Eoin Cleary	Pat O'Donnell
Cork	John Cleary	Ian Maguire	Sports Direct
Kerry	Jack O'Connor	Jack Moloney	Kerry Group
Limerick	Jimmy Lee	Cillian Fahy	None
Tipperary	Philly Ryan	Vacant	Fiserv
Waterford	Paul Shankey	Dermot Ryan	Cognizant

== Bracket ==
Quarter-finals
Tipperary	1-22
Waterford	1-19
5 April, Limerick
Cork	0-24
Limerick	0-13

Semi-finals
19 April, Ennis
Tipperary	1-15
Clare	2-18
19 April, Cork
Cork	1-25
Kerry	3-21

Final
4 May, Killarney
Clare	0-21
Kerry	4-20

== Quarter-finals ==
=== Matches ===
5 April 2025 Quarter-final	Tipperary	1-22 – 1-19	Waterford	Thurles
				Venue: Semple Stadium
	Gls: S O’Brien 1 Pts: P Feehan 1, M Freaney 4 (1tp), C Smith 6 (2fs), S O’Brien 8 (2tpf, 1tp, 1 '45)	Report	Gls: A Dunwoody 1 Pts: L Fennell 1, C Murray 5 (1tp), James Power 3 (1tp), J Curry 6 (4fs, 1 '45), A Dunwoody 2	Referee: Fergal Kelly (Longford); Attendance: 1,017

5 April 2025 Quarter-final	Cork	0-24 – 0-13	Limerick	Limerick
				Venue: TUS Gaelic Grounds
	Pts: Brian O'Driscoll 6 (2tp), Matty Taylor 1, Colm O’Callaghan 2, Paul Walsh 2, Seán McDonnell 1, Mark Cronin 6 (2tpf, 2f), Brian Hurley 4 (1f, 1tpf), Chris Óg Jones 1, Cathail O'Mahony 1	Report	Pts: Colm McSweeney 1, Paul Maher 1, Emmett Rigter 2 (1tpf), James Naughton 7 (1f, 2tpf), Peter Nash 2 (1f)	Referee: Derek O’Mahoney (Tipperary); Attendance: 2,042

== Semi-finals ==
=== Matches ===
19 April 2025 Semi-final	Clare	2-18 – 1-15	Tipperary	Ennis
2.00pm				Venue: Zimmer Biomet Phairc
		Report		Referee: James Molloy (Galway); Attendance: 2,893

19 April 2025 Semi-final	Kerry	3-21 – 1-25	Cork	Cork
7.00pm				Venue: Páirc Uí Chaoimh
		Report		Referee: Barry Tiernan (Dublin); Attendance: 14,358

== Final ==
=== Munster final ===
4 May 2025 Final	Kerry	4-20 – 0-21	Clare	Killarney
1.45pm				Venue: Fitzgerald Stadium
		Report		Referee: Noel Mooney (Cavan); Attendance: 13,181

- Clare and Kerry qualified for the 2025 All-Ireland Senior Football Championship group stage.

== Statistics ==
=== Scoring events ===
Does not include scores after extra-time.

- Widest winning margin: 11 points
  - Cork 0–24 — 0–13 Limerick (Quarter-finals)
  - Kerry 4–20 — 0–21 Clare (Final)
- Most goals in a match: 4
  - Kerry 4–20 — 0–21 Clare (Final)
- Most points in a match: 41
  - Tipperary 1–22 — 1–19 Waterford (Quarter-finals)
  - Kerry 4–20 — 0–21 Clare (Final)
- Most goals by one team in a match: 4
  - Kerry 4–20 — 0–21 Clare (Final)
- Most points by one team in a match: 24
  - Cork 0–24 — 0–13 Limerick (Quarter-finals)
- Highest aggregate score: 53 points
  - Kerry 4–20 — 0–21 Clare (Final)
- Lowest aggregate score: 37 points
  - Cork 0–24 — 0–13 Limerick (Quarter-finals)

== Stadia and attendance ==
County	Location	Province	Stadium	Capacity
Clare	Ennis	Munster	Cusack Park	20,100
Cork	Cork	Munster	Páirc Uí Chaoimh	45,300
Kerry	Killarney	Munster	Fitzgerald Stadium	38,000
Limerick	Limerick	Munster	Gaelic Grounds	44,023
Tipperary	Thurles	Munster	Semple Stadium	45,690
Waterford	Waterford	Munster	Fraher Field	15,000

Total attendance	33,491
Average attendance	6,698
Highest attendance	14,358; Cork 1-25 - 3-21 Kerry; 19 April 2025

== Miscellaneous ==
- Clare score their first Munster Senior Football Championship victory over Tipperary since 2000.
- Clare reached a third consecutive Munster Senior Football Championship Final, only previously doing so in the 1915, 1916, and the 1917 championships.

== See also ==
- 2025 All-Ireland Senior Football Championship
  - 2025 Connacht Senior Football Championship
  - 2025 Leinster Senior Football Championship
  - 2025 Ulster Senior Football Championship
