= 2022 Munster Senior Football Championship =

2022 Munster SFC
Tournament details
- Year: 2022

Winners
- Champions: Kerry (83rd win)
- Manager: Jack O'Connor
- Captain: Seán O'Shea

Runners-up
- Runners-up: Limerick

The 2022 Munster Senior Football Championship was the 2022 installment of the annual Munster Senior Football Championship organised by the Munster GAA. The defending champion, Kerry, retained the title after a 1–28 to 0–8 win against Limerick in the final on 28 May.

== Teams ==
The Munster championship is contested by all six counties in the Irish province of Munster.

Team	Colours	Sponsor	Manager	Captain	Last previous success
Team	Colours	Sponsor	Manager	Captain	All-Ireland	Provincial
Clare	Saffron and Blue		Colm Collins			1992
Cork	Red and white		John Cleary	Paul Kerrigan	2010	2012
Kerry	Green and gold		Jack O'Connor	Joe O'Connor	2014	2021
Limerick	Green and white		Billy Lee	Donal O'Sullivan	1896	1896
Tipperary	Blue and gold		David Power	Conor Sweeney	1920	2020
Waterford	White and blue		Ephie Fitzgerald	Paul Whyte		1898

== Draw ==
Cork and Kerry, finalists from the 2021 championship, received a bye to the semi-finals.

Seeded	Unseeded
Kerry (1st) Cork (2nd)	Limerick (SF) Tipperary (SF) Clare (QF) Waterford (QF)

== Bracket ==
Quarter-finals; 30 April
Waterford	1-08
Tipperary	2-13
Clare	1-19
Limerick	2-16 (p)

Semi-finals; 7/14 May
Cork	0-11
Kerry	0-23
Tipperary	0-10
Limerick	2-10

Final; 28 May
Kerry	1-28
Limerick	0-8

== Quarter-finals ==
=== Matches ===
The four non-finalists from the 2021 championship entered this round. The lowest ranked counties to play in the quarter-finals were Tipperary and Waterford of Division 4.

30 April 2022
Quarter-final

Waterford	1–8 – 2–13	Tipperary
J Curry (1-4, 1-0 pen, 0-4 frees), D Ryan and C Murray (0-2 each).	Report	C Sweeney (1-4, 1-0 pen, 0-2 frees), S O'Connor (0-4, 0-1 free), S O'Brien (1-0), M O'Shea (0-3), J Kennedy (0-2).

Fraher Field, Dungarvan
30 April 2022
Quarter Final

Clare	1-19 - 2-16 (a.e.t.)	Limerick
Jamie Malone (0-1), Darren O'Neill (0-2), Pearse Lillis (0-1), Eoin Cleary (capt, 0-6, 0-2F), Emmet McMahon (0-1); Gavin Cooney (0-1), David Tubridy (1-1, 1-0 penalty), Aaron Griffin (0-4), Brendan Rouine (0-2)	Report	Brian Fanning (1-0), Darragh Treacy (0-1), Cillian Fahy (0-2), Adrian Enright (0-1), Brian Donovan (0-1), Peter Nash (0-2), Josh Ryan (0-6, 0-4F, 0-1 mark), Hugh Bourke (0-1), Robbie Bourke (1-2, 0-1F)
Penalties
✗ Darren O'Neill; ✗ Conor Jordan; Joe McGann	1–4	Iain Corbett; Robbie Bourke; Brian Donovan; James Naughton

Cusack Park, Ennis
Attendance: 2,980
Referee: Conor Lane (Cork)

== Semi-finals ==
The two finalists from the 2021 championship entered this round along with the two quarter-final winners.

7 May 2022	Cork	0–11 – 0–23	Kerry	Pairc Ui Rinn, Cork; Attendance: 10,743; Referee: Brendan Cawley (Kildare)
7 May 2022	Steven Sherlock 0-6 (0-5f), Cathail O'Mahony 0-3, Eoghan McSweeney 0-1, Kevin O'Donovan 0-1.	Report	Seán O'Shea 0-10 (0-7f, 0-1 '45), David Clifford 0-4 (0-3f), Stephen O'Brien 0-2, Paul Geaney 0-2, Paudie Clifford 0-2, Diarmuid O'Connor 0-1, Tony Brosnan 0-1, Micheal Burns 0-1.	Pairc Ui Rinn, Cork; Attendance: 10,743; Referee: Brendan Cawley (Kildare)

14 May 2022	Limerick	2–10 – 0–10	Tipperary	Semple Stadium, Thurles; Referee: Paddy Neilan (Roscommon).
14 May 2022	Josh Ryan 1-1 (1f), Brian Donovan 1-0, Cillian Fahy and Robbie Bourke (1f) 0-3 each, Hugh Bourke 0-2 (1f), Adrian Enright 0-1	Report	Jack Kennedy 0-5 (2f, 3'45s), Sean O'Connell 0-2, Sean O'Connor (1f), Mark Russell and Shane O'Connell 0-1 each	Semple Stadium, Thurles; Referee: Paddy Neilan (Roscommon).

== Final ==
28 May 2022

Kerry	1–28 – 0–8	Limerick
Seán O'Shea 0-6 (0-1f, 0-1 '45), Killian Spillane 1-3, Paul Geaney 0-4 (0-1 mark), Tony Brosnan 0-3, Tom O'Sullivan 0-3, Mícheál Burns 0-2, Brian Ó Beaglaoich 0-2, Paudie Clifford 0-2, Gavin White 0-1, Adrian Spillane 0-1, Stephen O'Brien 0-1.	Report	Cian Sheehan 0-3, Iain Corbett 0-2, Josh Ryan 0-2 (0-1f, 0-1 '45), Gordon Brown 0-1.

Fitzgerald Stadium, Killarney
Attendance: 14,587
Referee: Martin McNally (Monaghan)

Kerry advanced to the 2022 All-Ireland Senior Football Championship quarter-finals, while Limerick advanced to the qualifiers.

== Stadia and locations ==
County	Location	Province	Stadium	Capacity
Clare	Ennis	Munster	Cusack Park	19,000
Cork	Cork	Munster	Páirc Uí Chaoimh	45,000
Kerry	Tralee	Munster	Fitzgerald Stadium	40,000
Limerick	Limerick	Munster	Gaelic Grounds	44,203
Tipperary	Thurles	Munster	Semple Stadium	45,690
Waterford	Waterford	Munster	Fraher Field	15,000

== All-Ireland/Tailteann Cup qualification ==
NFL Rank	Team	Championship	Qualification Method
1	Kerry	Qualification for the 2022 All-Ireland Senior Football Championship	Via the Provincial Final
13	Clare	Qualification for the 2022 All-Ireland Senior Football Championship	Via the 2022 National Football League
14	Cork	Qualification for the 2022 All-Ireland Senior Football Championship	Via the 2022 National Football League
16	Limerick	Qualification for the 2022 All-Ireland Senior Football Championship	Via the Provincial Final
24	Tipperary	Qualification for the 2022 Tailteann Cup	Via the 2022 National Football League
32	Waterford	Qualification for the 2022 Tailteann Cup	Via the 2022 National Football League
