= Shane Ronayne =

Gaelic football manager (born 1979)

Personal information
- Born: 29 September 1979 (age 47) Mitchelstown, County Cork, Ireland
- Occupation: Secondary school teacher

Sport
Club management
- Years: Club
- 2014–present: Mourneabbey
	6	6	2
Inter-county management
- Years: Team
- 2016–2020 2021 2021–: Tipperary ladies Waterford; Cork ladies

Shane Ronayne (born 29 September 1979) is a Gaelic football manager whose first senior inter-county management job, since January 2021, was as manager of the Waterford county team, his father's native county. He resigned after eight months, having managed Waterford to an opening round exit from the 2021 Munster SFC against Limerick and a solitary competitive win against Wexford in the NFL's Division 4.

Before taking charge of the Waterford footballers, he led the Tipperary ladies' Gaelic football team to four national titles during four years in charge. Ronayne took over a team playing Division Three league football and intermediate championship, he left the team as it was about to begin a third year in Division One of the National League and a second year of senior championship.

Ronayne began managing in 2005.

== Honours ==
Mourneabbey

- All-Ireland Ladies' Club Football Championship: 2018, 2019
- Munster Ladies' Senior Club Football Championship: 2014, 2015, 2016, 2017, 2018, 2019
- Cork Ladies' Club Football Championship: 2014, 2015, 2016, 2017, 2018, 2019

Tipperary

- All-Ireland Intermediate Ladies' Football Championship: 2017, 2019

Sporting positions
Preceded by Benji Whelan	Waterford Senior Football Team Manager; 2021	Succeeded by Ephie Fitzgerald
Preceded by Ephie Fitzgerald	Cork Senior Ladies' Football Team Manager; 2021–	Succeeded by Incumbent
