= 2021 Munster Senior Football Championship =

2021 Munster SFC
Tournament details
- Year: 2021

Winners
- Champions: Kerry (82nd win)

Runners-up
- Runners-up: Cork

The 2021 Munster Senior Football Championship was the 2021 installment of the annual Munster Senior Football Championship organised by the Munster GAA. Kerry won the tournament beating Cork in the final.

== Teams ==
The Munster championship is contested by all six counties in the Irish province of Munster.

Team	Colours	Sponsor	Manager	Captain	Last previous success
Team	Colours	Sponsor	Manager	Captain	All-Ireland	Provincial
Clare	Saffron and Blue		Colm Collins	?		1992
Cork	Red and white		Ronan McCarthy	Paul Kerrigan	2010	2012
Kerry	Green and gold		Peter Keane	Paul Murphy	2014	2019
Limerick	Green and white		Billy Lee	Donal O'Sullivan	1896	1896
Tipperary	Blue and gold		David Power	Conor Sweeney	1920	2020
Waterford	White and blue		Shane Ronayne	Paul Whyte		1898

== Bracket ==
Quarter-finals
Limerick	4-18
Waterford	0-12
Kerry	3-22
Clare	1-11

Semi-finals
Cork	1-16
Limerick	0-11
Tipperary	1-8
Kerry	1-19

Final
Cork	1-9
Kerry	4-22

== Quarter-finals ==
The four non-finalists from the 2020 championship entered this round. The lowest ranked county to play in the quarter-finals was Waterford of Division 4.

=== Summary ===
Div	Team 1	Score	Team 2	Div
3	Limerick	4-18 - 0-12	Waterford	4
1	Kerry	3-22 - 1-11	Clare	2

=== Matches ===
26 June 2021; 15:00; Quarter-final	Limerick (3)	4-18 - 0-12	Waterford (4)	Gaelic Grounds, Limerick; Attendance: 0 (Note: The game was played behind closed doors due to the impact of the COVID-19 pandemic on Gaelic games.); Referee: Joe McQuillan (Cavan)
26 June 2021; 15:00; Quarter-final	Hugh Bourke 1-6 (0-3f), Iain Corbett (1-0 pen) and Robbie Bourke (0-1f) 1-2 each, Cillian Fahy 1-1, Cian Sheehan and Danny Neville 0-2 each, Tommie Childs, Brian Donovan, Josh Ryan 0-1 each	Report	Brian Lynch 0-4 (0-3f), Dermot Ryan 0-3, Jason Curry (0-2f) and Darragh Corcoran 0-2 each, Michael Kiely 0-1	Gaelic Grounds, Limerick; Attendance: 0 Referee: Joe McQuillan (Cavan)

26 June 2021; 19:00; Quarter-final	Kerry (1)	3-22 - 1-11	Clare (2)	Fitzgerald Stadium, Killarney; Attendance: 0 Referee: Jerome Henry (Mayo); Man of the Match: Sean O'Shea (Kenmare Shamrocks)
26 June 2021; 19:00; Quarter-final	Seán O'Shea 1-7 (0-3f), David Clifford 1-6 (0-2f), Micheál Burns 1-0, Killian Spillane 0-3, Gavin White and Paudie Clifford 0-2 each, David Moran and Paul Geaney 0-1 each	Report	Eoin Cleary 0-6 (0-2f), David Tubridy 1-1 (0-1f), Darragh Bohannon 0-2, Podge Collins and Emmet McMahon 0-1 each	Fitzgerald Stadium, Killarney; Attendance: 0 Referee: Jerome Henry (Mayo); Man of the Match: Sean O'Shea (Kenmare Shamrocks)

== Semi-finals ==
The finalists from the 2020 championship entered this round along with the two quarter-final winners. The lowest ranked counties to play in the quarter-finals were Limerick and Tipperary of Division 3.

=== Summary ===
Div	Team 1	Score	Team 2	Div
2	Cork	1-16 - 0-11	Limerick	3
1	Kerry	1-19 - 1-08	Tipperary	3

=== Matches ===
10 July 2021; 15:00 IST (UTC+1); Semi-final	Cork (2)	1-16 - 0-11	Limerick (3)	Gaelic Grounds, Limerick; Attendance: 500; Referee: Brendan Cawley (Kildare)
10 July 2021; 15:00 IST (UTC+1); Semi-final	John O'Rourke 1-3, Brian Hurley 0-6 (0-4f), Sean Powter and Cian Kiely 0-2 each, Sean Meehan, Mattie Taylor, Ian Maguire 0-1 each	Report	Hugh Bourke 0-5f, Iain Corbett and Danny Neville 0-2 each, Gordon Brown and Aaron O'Sullivan (1 '45) 0-1 each	Gaelic Grounds, Limerick; Attendance: 500; Referee: Brendan Cawley (Kildare)

10 July 2021; 19:00 IST (UTC+1); Semi-final	Kerry (1)	1-19 - 1-8	Tipperary (3)	Semple Stadium, Thurles; Attendance: 500; Referee: Niall Cullen (Fermanagh); Man of the Match: Paudie Clifford (Fossa)
10 July 2021; 19:00 IST (UTC+1); Semi-final	Seán O'Shea 0-8 (0-5f, 1 '45), David Clifford 1-2 (0-1f), Killian Spillane 0-3, Tom O'Sullivan 0-2, David Moran, Diarmuid O'Connor, Paul Geaney, Paudie Clifford 0-1 each	Report	Conor Sweeney 1-4 (1-0 pen, 0-3f), Jack Kennedy 0-3 (0-2f), Kevin Fahey 0-1	Semple Stadium, Thurles; Attendance: 500; Referee: Niall Cullen (Fermanagh); Man of the Match: Paudie Clifford (Fossa)

== Final ==
25 July 2021; 16:00 IST (UTC+1); Final	Kerry	4-22 - 1-9	Cork	Fitzgerald Stadium, Killarney; Attendance: 2,500; Referee: Barry Cassidy, Bellaghy (Derry)
25 July 2021; 16:00 IST (UTC+1); Final	Seán O'Shea 1-6 (0-3f), Paul Geaney 2-1, Paudie Clifford 0-3, Brian Ó Beaglaoich 1-0, Jack Barry, Killian Spillane, Tom O'Sullivan 0-2 each, Mike Breen, David Moran, David Clifford (0-1f), Stephen O'Brien, Tadhg Morley, Tommy Walsh 0-1 each.	Report	Brian Hurley 1-3 (0-1f), Michael Hurley 0-2, Brian Hartnett, Ian Maguire, Luke Connolly, Daniel Dineen (0-1 mark) 0-1 each.	Fitzgerald Stadium, Killarney; Attendance: 2,500; Referee: Barry Cassidy, Bellaghy (Derry)

Kerry advanced to the 2021 All-Ireland Senior Football Championship semi-finals.

== Stadia and locations ==
County	Location	Province	Stadium	Capacity
Clare	Ennis	Munster	Cusack Park	19,000
Cork	Cork	Munster	Páirc Uí Chaoimh	45,000
Kerry	Tralee	Munster	Fitzgerald Stadium	40,000
Limerick	Limerick	Munster	Gaelic Grounds	44,203
Tipperary	Thurles	Munster	Semple Stadium	45,690
Waterford	Waterford	Munster	Fraher Field	15,000
