= Benji Whelan =

Gaelic football manager

Sport
Inter-county management
- Years: Team
- 2018–2020: Waterford

Benji Whelan is a Gaelic football manager. He managed his native Waterford between 2018 and 2020.

He is from Kilmacthomas and has 1 wife and a small number of children.

He led The Nire to two Munster Senior Club Football Championship finals (2014 and 2016).

Sporting positions
Preceded by Tom McGlinchey	Waterford Senior Football Manager; 2018–2020	Succeeded by Shane Ronayne
