= Brendan Cawley =

Gaelic games referee

Brendan Cawley is a Gaelic football referee and a member of the National Referees Panel.

A member of the Sarsfields GAA club in County Kildare, Cawley was appointed to the National Referees Panel in 2019, and took charge of the 2023 National Football League final, the All-Ireland Club Senior Football Championship final in 2024, and the 2025 Ulster Senior Football Championship final.

Cawley was tested with the 2024 All-Ireland Senior Football Championship quarter-final between Armagh and Kerry. On 14 July, the Irish Examiner reported on its website that Cawley was the leading contender to referee the 2025 All Ireland final. The next day, he was appointed for his first final as referee. It would be his 30th SFC match. He was also the first Kildare referee since 2005, and seventh overall. But it is his third final to be involved in overall as he was a linesman in both 2021 and 2024.

The dominance of Sarsfields in the Kildare Senior Football Championship meant Cawley did not referee a final there until 2022 and by the time of his first All Ireland final he had refereed the county final in 2024 as well.

The ‘’Belfast Telegraph’’, described Cawley in 2025 as “a diligent, capable whistler who allows play to flow but is quick to intercede when rough play ensues”. Cahair O'Kane, journalist with ‘’The Irish News’’, called Cawley in 2025 "alongside Sean Hurson as the best referee in the country the last couple of years". However, Jim McGuinness criticised decisions Cawley made during Donegal's loss to Galway in the 2024 semi-final, saying “There were a number that we weren't happy with. In the first minute, Ryan McHugh was breaking through, had two men pulling at him and he was blown for over-carrying“.
