= John Cleary (Gaelic footballer) =

Irish Gaelic footballer

Personal information
- Native name: Seán Ó Cléirigh (Irish)
- Born: 20 June 1963 (age 63) Castlehaven, County Cork, Ireland
- Occupation: Insurance broker
- Height: 5 ft 8 in (173 cm)

Sport
- Sport: Gaelic football
- Position: Left corner-forward
Club
- Years: Club
- 1979-1999: Castlehaven
Club titles
- Cork titles: 2
- Munster titles: 3
Inter-county*
Years	County	Apps (scores)
1983-1993	Cork	21 (4-48)
Inter-county titles
- Munster titles: 3
- All-Irelands: 2
- NFL: 1
- All Stars: 0
- *Inter County team apps and scores correct as of 14:22, 30 July 2015.

John Cleary (born 20 June 1963) is an Irish former Gaelic footballer who played as a left corner-forward at senior level for the Cork county team.

Born in Castlehaven, County Cork, Cleary first arrived on the inter-county scene at the age of sixteen when he first linked up with the Cork minor team before later joining the under-21 side. He made his senior debut during the 1983 championship. Cleary immediately became a regular member of the starting fifteen and won two All-Ireland medals, three Munster medals and one National Football League medal. He was an All-Ireland runner-up on three occasions.

Cleary was a member of the Munster inter-provincial team on a number of occasions but never won a Railway Cup medal. At club level he is a three-time Munster medallist with Castlehaven. In addition to this Cleary also on two championship medals.

Cleary's sister, Nollaig Cleary, and his brother-in-law, Niall Cahalane, are also All-Ireland medallists with Cork.

Throughout his career Cleary made 21 championship appearances. He retired from inter-county football following the conclusion of the 1993 championship.

In retirement from playing Cleary became involved in team management and coaching. He is an All-Ireland-winning manager and selector with the Cork under-21 team while he also had championship success as a selector with Castlehaven.

== Playing career ==
=== Club ===
After enjoying championship success in the under-21 grade with Castlehaven, Cleary subsequently joined the senior team. In 1989 the club qualified for only their second ever championship decider with St. Finbarr's providing the opposition. A narrow 0-9 to 0-7 victory gave Cleary his first championship medal. Castlehaven later qualified for the provincial decider. A 0-13 to 1-8 defeat of St. Senan's gave Cleary his first Munster medal.

Cleary won a second championship medal in 1994 as Castlehaven defeated bitter local rivals O'Donovan Rossa by 0-12 to 0-10 in one of the greatest deciders of all time. He later won a second Munster medal following a 2-14 to 1-4 defeat of Clonmel Commercials.

In spite of losing a controversial championship decider in 1997, Castlehaven still represented Cork in the provincial series as divisional side Beara were prohibited from doing so. A 1-14 to 1-8 defeat of Fethard in the decider gave Cleary a third Munster medal.

=== Minor and under-21 ===
Cleary first played for Cork as a member of the minor team on 8 May 1980. He scored 3-2 after being introduced as a substitute in Cork's 8-20 to 1-2 Munster semi-final defeat of Limerick.

In 1981 Cleary won a Munster medal in the minor grade following a narrow 0-9 to 1-5 defeat of archrivals Kerry. On 20 September 1981 Cork faced Derry in the All-Ireland decider. A comfortable 4-9 to 2-7 victory gave Cleary, who scored 1-4, an All-Ireland Minor Football Championship medal.

Cleary joined the Cork under-21 team the following year and enjoyed further success. A 2-12 to 0-4 trouncing of Kerry gave him his first Munster medal in that grade.

In 1984 Cleary was in his final year with the under-21 team. He won a second Munster medal that year as Limerick were accounted for by 1-18 to 0-4. On 26 August 1984 Cork faced Mayo in the All-Ireland decider. A narrow 0-9 to 0-6 victory gave Cleary an All-Ireland medal.

=== Senior ===
Cleary made his senior championship debut on 3 July 1983 in a 1-11 to 1-5 Munster semi-final defeat of Clare. Cork later shocked nine-in-a-row hopefuls Kerry in the provincial decider. A last-minute Tadhg Murphy goal secured a narrow 3-10 to 3-9 victory and a first Munster medal for Cleary.

Kerry dominated the next three championships, however, Cork ended their greatest generation in 1987. A 0-13 to 1-5 victory in the provincial decider replay gave Cleary a second Munster medal. On 20 September 1987 Cork faced Meath in the All-Ireland decider. Cork were well on top for the opening twenty minutes and nearly took a seven-point lead when Jimmy Kerrigan's shot was blocked by Mick Lyons. A Colm O'Rourke goal in the 25th minute steadied the Meath ship and gave them an interval lead of 1-6 to 0-8. An injury to Cork full-back Colman Corrigan necessitated his withdrawal and had a further upsetting effect on the team. Cork failed to capitalize on another goal chance and were eventually defeated by 1-14 to 0-11.

Cleary missed Cork's championship campaign in 1988, but returned to the starting fifteen during the 1988-89 league campaign. He won a National League medal that year as Cork defeated New York with an aggregate score of 3-21 to 2-14 after a two-leg final. Cleary later added a third Munster medal to his collection as Cork defeated Kerry by 1-12 to 1-9. On 17 September 1989 Cleary lined out in a second All-Ireland decider as Mayo provided the opposition. Cork started quickly and took an early three-point lead. An Anthony Finnerty goal in the 38th minute gave Mayo a brief lead, however, they failed to score in the last nineteen minutes of the game. A 0-17 to 1-11 victory gave Cork the victory and saved them from becoming the first team to lose three All-Ireland finals in-a-row. It was Cleary's first All-Ireland medal.

Throughout the 1990 championship campaign Cleary's appearances were limited. He missed Cork's fourth successive provincial triumph and also failed to make the starting fifteen for the All-Ireland decider against Meath on 16 September 1990. Shay Fahy controlled midfield as Cork built up an early lead. Colm O'Neill was dismissed just before the interval, however, fourteen-man just about survived in the second half. Cleary was introduced as a substitute and won his second All-Ireland medal following a narrow 0-11 to 0-9 victory.

Cleary was confined to the bench for Cork's unsuccessful championship campaigns in 1991 and 1992, however, he returned to the starting fifteen for Cork's opening games in 1993. After being dropped for the Munster final he also failed to make the starting fifteen for Cork's All-Ireland final meeting with Derry on 15 September 1993. Cork started well once again but Derry capitalized on some careless play to take the lead. Tony Davis was unjustly and incorrectly sent off for what was later deemed to be a legal challenge on an opponent. Cleary was introduced as a substitute, however, Séamus Downey scored the key goal which gave Derry a 1-14 to 2-8 victory. This was Cleary's last game for Cork.

== Managerial career ==
=== Castlehaven ===
Having previously served as manager of the Castlehaven senior team, Cleary was a selector in 2011 when the club reached their first championship decider in eight years. University College Cork provided the opposition and the game looked to be heading for a draw. With five minutes left a Daithí Casey penalty gave UCC the lead and they eventually won by 1-12 to 0-10.

Castlehaven were back in the decider again in 2012 where they faced divisional side Duhallow. Once again it looked as if Castlehaven were going to be narrowly defeated, however, a Shane Nolan goal in the dying minutes of the game secured a 1-7 to 0-9 victory. It was Cleary's first championship success as a selector.

For the third year in-a-row, Castlehaven were back in the championship decider and Cleary was still involved as a selector. County kingpins Nemo Rangers were the opponents and, once again, a close game developed. A personal tally of 0-12 for Brian Hurley helped Castlehaven to a 0-16 to 1-11 victory.

In 2014 Cleary was appointed manager of the Castlehaven under-21 team.

=== Cork under-21 selector ===
In October 2003 Cleary was included as a selector as part of Tony Leahy's Cork under-21 management team. Success was immediate as Cork claimed the Munster title in 2004 following a narrow 0-13 to 0-12 defeat of Kerry. Cork's under-21 footballers continued their provincial dominance once again in 2005. A 1-14 to 1-11 defeat of Limerick saw Cleary's side retain the Munster title. Cork made it three provincial titles in-a-row in 2006 following a 4-14 to 1-6 trouncing of Waterford, however, All-Ireland success still eluded the team.

Cork won a remarkable fourth successive Munster title in 2007 following a 3-19 to 3-12 defeat of Tipperary. On 5 May 2007 Cork faced Laois in the All-Ireland decider. A Daniel Goulding point, two minutes into injury time, secured a narrow 2-10 to 0-15 victory for Cork and an All-Ireland title for the Cleary-coached side.

=== Cork under-21 manager ===
In November 2007 Cleary succeeded Tony Leahy as manager of the Cork under-21 team. After a disastrous opening season Cleary guided Cork to the Munster title in 2009 following a narrow 1-9 to 2-5 defeat of Tipperary. On 4 May 2009 Cork faced Down in the All-Ireland decider. Cork were trailing by two points in an injury time when a Colm O'Driscoll goal two minutes into injury time secured a narrow 1-13 to 2-9 victory. It was Cleary's first All-Ireland victory as a manager.

After surrendering their provincial and All-Ireland titles in 2010, Cork bounced back the following year. A 2-24 to 0-8 trouncing of age-old rivals Kerry secured the Munster title.

Cleary's side retained their provincial crown in 2012 following a 2-12 to 1-14 defeat of Kerry.

Cork secured a third successive Munster crown in 2013 following a 1-17 to 0-9 defeat of Tipperary. This victory gave Cleary an eighth provincial title with the Cork under-21 team. On 4 May 2013 Cork faced Galway in the All-Ireland decider. Four points from both Ian Burke and Shane Walsh together with Damien Comer's second-half goal ensured a 1-14 to 1-11 defeat for Cork.

Cleary stepped down as Cork under-21 manager in June 2013.

=== Cork senior coach and manager ===
Keith Ricken was ratified as manager of the senior Cork county team for the 2022 season.

He stood aside as Cork senior manager for the remainder of the season in April 2022, due to health problems. John Cleary, who had been coaching the team, replaced him.

== Honours ==
=== Player ===
Castlehaven

- Munster Senior Club Football Championship (3): 1989, 1994, 1997
- Cork Senior Club Football Championship (2): 1990, 1995
- Cork Under-21 Club Football Championship (2): 1981, 1983

Cork

- All-Ireland Senior Football Championship (2): 1989, 1990
- Munster Senior Football Championship (6): 1983, 1987, 1988, 1989, 1990, 1993
- National Football League (1): 1988-89
- All-Ireland Under-21 Football Championship (1): 1984
- Munster Under-21 Football Championship (2): 1982, 1984
- All-Ireland Minor Football Championship (1): 1981
- Munster Minor Football Championship (1): 1981

=== Manager/Selector ===
Castlehaven

- Cork Senior Club Football Championship (2): 2012, 2013

Cork Ladies

- All-Ireland Under-16 Ladies' Football Championship (1): 2014

Cork

- All-Ireland Under-21 Football Championship (2): 2007, 2009
- Munster Under-21 Football Championship (8): 2004, 2005, 2006, 2007, 2009, 2011, 2012, 2013

Sporting positions
Preceded by Tony Leahy	Cork Under-21 Football Manager; 2007-2013	Succeeded by Seán Hayes
Preceded by Keith Ricken	Cork Senior Football Manager; 2022-	Succeeded by Incumbent
Achievements
Preceded by Seán Geaney	All-Ireland Under-21 Football Final winning manager 2009	Succeeded by Jim Gavin
