= List of Gaelic Athletic Association stadiums =

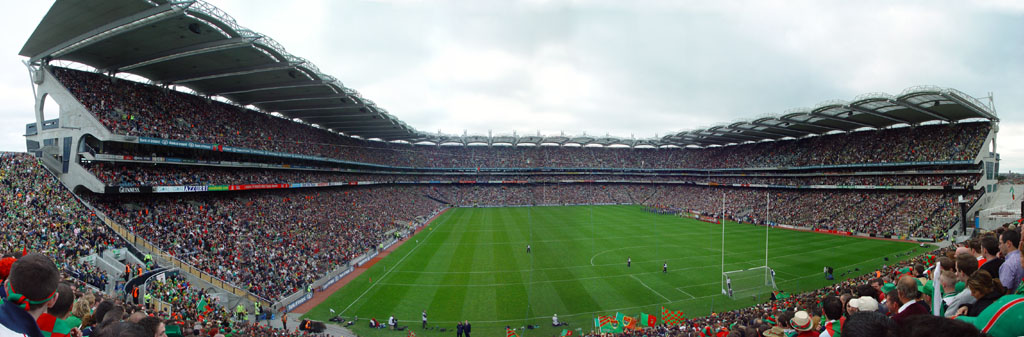
Croke Park, the largest stadium of any kind in Ireland.

The following is a list of stadiums used by the Gaelic Athletic Association (GAA). The stadiums are ordered by capacity; that is, the maximum number of spectators each stadium is authorised by the GAA to accommodate.

Three of the stadiums above 35,000 capacity are used for Gaelic football and hurling provincial finals, while the largest stadium, Croke Park, is used for the All-Ireland Senior Championship Finals each year, and the semi- and quarter-finals of each sport. It is also used on occasion for the Leinster provincial finals and Ulster provincial finals in Gaelic football, and has been leased for non-GAA events.

Croke Park has hosted 124 of the 138 finals of the All-Ireland Senior Football Championship, and all finals since 1908, except for the 1947 All-Ireland Senior Football Championship Final, which was played at the Polo Grounds in New York City.

Similarly, Croke Park has hosted 120 of the 138 finals of the All-Ireland Senior Hurling Championship, and all finals since 1912, except in 1937, when it was held at FitzGerald Stadium in Killarney due to construction work at Croke Park, and in 1984, when it was held at Semple Stadium in Thurles, County Tipperary, to mark the centenary of the founding of the GAA in the town.

Fans are not usually segregated at GAA venues.

== County grounds ==
Below are the locations of the county stadiums for county teams that participate in either the All-Ireland Senior Hurling Championship or the All-Ireland Senior Football Championship.

Locations of County grounds used for Gaelic Games

Locations of County grounds used for Gaelic Games in Dublin

Outside Ireland

Locations of County grounds used for Gaelic games in New York

Locations of County grounds used for Gaelic Games in England

=== County grounds ===
This is a list of all the current county grounds and their location.

County	Location	Province	Stadium(s)	Capacity
Antrim	Belfast	Ulster	Casement Park	31,661
Antrim	Belfast	Ulster	Corrigan Park	3,700
Armagh	Armagh	Ulster	Athletic Grounds	18,500
Carlow	Carlow	Leinster	Dr Cullen Park	11,000
Cavan	Cavan	Ulster	Breffni Park	25,030
Clare	Ennis	Munster	Cusack Park	19,000
Cork	Cork	Munster	Páirc Uí Chaoimh	45,300
Cork	Cork	Munster	Páirc Uí Rinn	16,440
Derry	Derry	Ulster	Celtic Park	22,000
Derry	Owenbeg	Ulster	Owenbeg Derry GAA Centre	7,200
Donegal	Ballybofey	Ulster	MacCumhaill Park	18,000
Donegal	Ballyshannon	Ulster	Fr Tierney Park	9,000
Donegal	Letterkenny	Ulster	O'Donnell Park	8,200
Down	Newry	Ulster	Páirc Esler	20,000
Down	Ballycran	Ulster	McKenna Park	1,320
Dublin	Dublin	Leinster	Croke Park	82,300
Dublin	Dublin	Leinster	Parnell Park	7,300
Fermanagh	Enniskillen	Ulster	Brewster Park	18,000
Galway	Galway	Connacht	Pearse Stadium	26,197
Galway	Athenry	Connacht	Kenny Park	6,500
Galway	Tuam	Connacht	St Jarlath's Park	6,700
Kerry	Killarney	Munster	Fitzgerald Stadium	38,000
Kerry	Tralee	Munster	Austin Stack Park	14,000
Kildare	Newbridge	Leinster	St Conleth's Park	15,000
Kilkenny	Kilkenny	Leinster	Nowlan Park	27,000
Lancashire	East Didsbury	Britain	Old Bedians	
Laois	Portlaoise	Leinster	O'Moore Park	22,000
Leitrim	Carrick-on-Shannon	Connacht	Páirc Seán Mac Diarmada	9,331
Limerick	Limerick	Munster	Gaelic Grounds	44,203
London	South Ruislip	Britain	McGovern Park	3,000
Longford	Longford	Leinster	Pearse Park	10,000
Louth	Drogheda	Leinster	Gaelic Grounds	3,500
Mayo	Castlebar	Connacht	MacHale Park	27,870
Meath	Navan	Leinster	Páirc Tailteann	11,000
Monaghan	Clones	Ulster	St Tiernach's Park	29,000
New York	The Bronx		Gaelic Park	2,000
Offaly	Tullamore	Leinster	O'Connor Park	20,000
Offaly	Birr	Leinster	St Brendan's Park	8,800
Roscommon	Roscommon	Connacht	Dr Hyde Park	18,890
Sligo	Sligo	Connacht	Markievicz Park	18,558
Tipperary	Thurles	Munster	Semple Stadium	45,690
Tyrone	Omagh	Ulster	Healy Park	17,636
Warwickshire	Solihull	Britain	Páirc na hÉireann	4,500
Waterford	Waterford	Munster	Walsh Park	16,500
Waterford	Dungarvan	Munster	Fraher Field	3,600
Westmeath	Mullingar	Leinster	Cusack Park	11,000
Wexford	Wexford	Leinster	Wexford Park	18,000
Wicklow	Aughrim	Leinster	Aughrim County Ground	7,000

== List of GAA grounds by capacity ==
Below is a list of the 50 GAA stadiums ranked by capacity.

Rank	Stadium	Capacity	Location	Coordinates	County	Image
1	Croke Park	82,300	Dublin	53°21′38.70″N 6°15′4.80″W	GAA	
2	Semple Stadium	45,690	Thurles	52°40′55.91″N 7°49′30.40″W	Tipperary GAA	
3	Páirc Uí Chaoimh	45,000	Cork	51°53′59.10″N 8°26′6.15″W	Cork GAA	
4	Gaelic Grounds	44,023	Limerick	52°40′12.50″N 8°39′15.10″W	Limerick GAA	
5	Fitzgerald Stadium	38,000	Killarney	52°3′58.75″N 9°30′28.56″W	Kerry GAA	
6	St Tiernach's Park	29,000	Clones	54°11′8.04″N 7°13′57.86″W	Monaghan GAA	
7	MacHale Park	27,870	Castlebar	53°51′13.92″N 9°17′3.93″W	Mayo GAA	
8	Nowlan Park	27,000	Kilkenny	52°39′23.03″N 7°14′22.85″W	Kilkenny GAA	
9	Pearse Stadium	26,197	Galway	53°15′47.92″N 9°5′2.98″W	Galway GAA	
10	Breffni Park	25,030	Cavan	53°58′54.54″N 7°21′33.38″W	Cavan GAA	
11	Dr. Hyde Park	23,900	Roscommon	53°37′29.70″N 8°10′50.54″W	Roscommon GAA	
12	O'Moore Park	22,000	Portlaoise	53°1′33.84″N 7°18′7.93″W	Laois GAA	
13	Cusack Park	20,100	Ennis	52°50′46.73″N 8°58′43.18″W	Clare GAA	
14	Páirc Esler	20,000	Newry	54°9′9.77″N 6°19′27.42″W	Down GAA	
15	Markievicz Park	18,558	Sligo	54°15′26.10″N 8°27′56.08″W	Sligo GAA	
16	Páirc na gCeilteach	18,500	Derry	54°59′35.73″N 7°20′0.83″W	Derry GAA	
17	Athletic Grounds	18,500	Armagh	54°20′36.15″N 6°39′41.21″W	Armagh GAA	
18	Wexford Park	18,000	Wexford	52°19′57.47″N 6°28′33.20″W	Wexford GAA	
19	Brewster Park	18,000	Enniskillen	54°21′3.62″N 7°38′1.92″W	Fermanagh GAA	
20	O'Connor Park	18,000	Tullamore	53°16′49.80″N 7°29′21.93″W	Offaly GAA	
21	Healy Park	17,636	Omagh	54°36′49.89″N 7°17′45.95″W	Tyrone GAA	
22	MacCumhaill Park	17,500	Ballybofey	54°48′3.69″N 7°46′42.38″W	Donegal GAA	
23	Páirc Uí Rinn	16,440	Cork	51°53′29.1″N 8°26′13.39″W	Cork GAA	
24	Fraher Field	15,000	Dungarvan	52°5′48.06″N 7°37′25.09″W	Waterford GAA	
25	St Conleth's Park	15,000	Newbridge	53°10′45.88″N 6°47′39.77″W	Kildare GAA	
26	St Mary's Park	14,000	Castleblayney	54°11′8.04″N 7°13′57.86″W	Monaghan GAA	
27	Austin Stack Park	14,000	Tralee	52°16′09.51″N 9°41′38.37″W	Kerry GAA	
28	Cusack Park	11,500	Mullingar	53°31′40.83″N 7°20′18.75″W	Westmeath GAA	
29	Dr. Cullen Park	11,000	Carlow	52°50′49.38″N 6°54′58.82″W	Carlow GAA	
30	Walsh Park	11,046	Waterford	52°15′17″N 7°7′43.79″W	Waterford GAA	
31	Páirc Tailteann	11,000	Navan	53°38′59.03″N 6°41′38.28″W	Meath GAA	
32	Páirc Seán Mac Diarmada	9,331	Carrick-on-Shannon	53°56′53.01″N 8°4′30.53″W	Leitrim GAA	
33	Fr Tierney Park	9,000	Ballyshannon		Donegal GAA	
34	St Brendan's Park	8,800	Birr	53°5′29.14″N 7°54′31.01″W	Offaly GAA	
35	Parnell Park	8,500	Donnycarney	53°22′22.70″N 6°13′0″W	Dublin GAA	
36	O'Donnell Park	8,200	Letterkenny		Donegal GAA	
37	Aughrim County Ground	7,000	Wicklow	52°51′9.58″N 6°20′7.29″W	Wicklow GAA	
38	O'Garney Park	7,000	Sixmilebridge		Clare GAA	
39	St Jarlath's Park	6,700	Tuam	53°50′34″N 8°51′11″W	Galway GAA	
40	Pearse Park	6,000	Longford	53°44′21.29″N 7°48′7.46″W	Longford GAA	
41	McKenna Park	5,000	Ballycran	54°28′38.99″N 5°30′26.94″W	Down GAA	
42	Pearse Park	5,000	Arklow		Wicklow GAA	
43	Corrigan Park	3,700	Belfast		Antrim GAA	
44	Gaelic Grounds	3,500	Drogheda	53°43′24.89″N 6°21′33.76″W	Louth GAA	
45	McGovern Park	3,000	Ruislip	51°33′01″N 0°23′54″W	London GAA	
46	Duggan Park	3,000	Ballinasloe		Galway GAA	
47	Gaelic Park	2,000	New York City	40°53′15″N 73°54′5″W	New York GAA	
48	Páirc Phroinsías	1,000	Clara		Offaly GAA	

== See also ==
- Sport in Ireland
- Féile na nGael
- List of stadiums by capacity
- List of stadiums in Ireland by capacity
- List of British stadiums by capacity
- List of stadiums in England
- List of stadiums in Wales by capacity
- List of European stadiums by capacity
- Lists of stadiums
