= Jack O'Connor (Gaelic footballer) =

Irish Gaelic footballer and manager

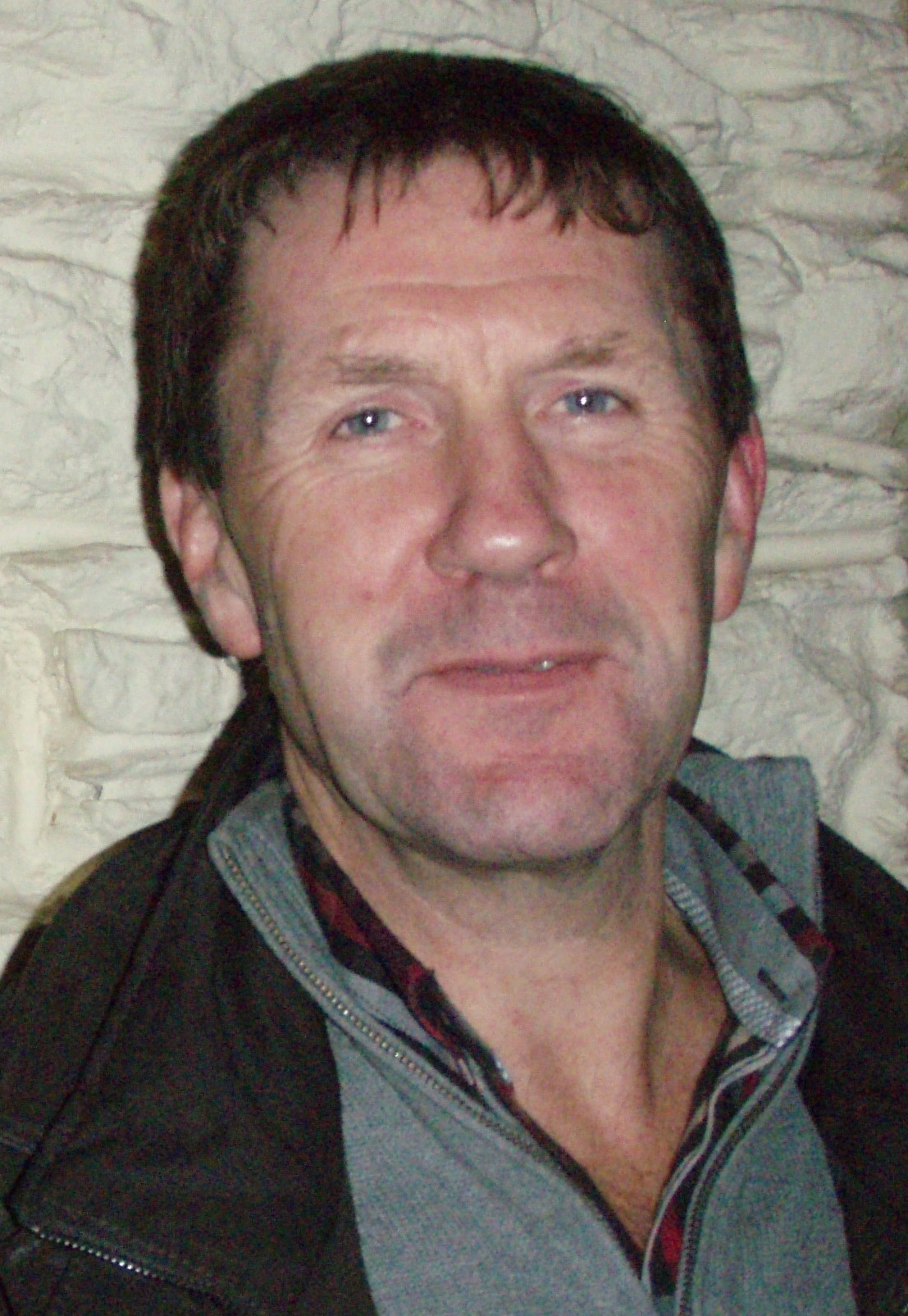

Personal information
- Native name: Seán Ó Conchubhair (Irish)
- Born: 27 October 1960 (age 66) Mastergeehy, County Kerry, Ireland

Sport
- Sport: Gaelic football
Club management
- Years: Club
- 2007–2008: Kerins O'Rahilly's
Club titles as manager
Club	County	Province	All-Ireland
Kerins O'Rahilly's	0	0	0
Inter-county management
- Years: Team
- 2003–2006 2008–2012 2019–2021 2021–: Kerry; Kerry; Kildare; Kerry
Inter-county titles as manager
County	League	Province	All-Ireland
Kerry	5	9	5

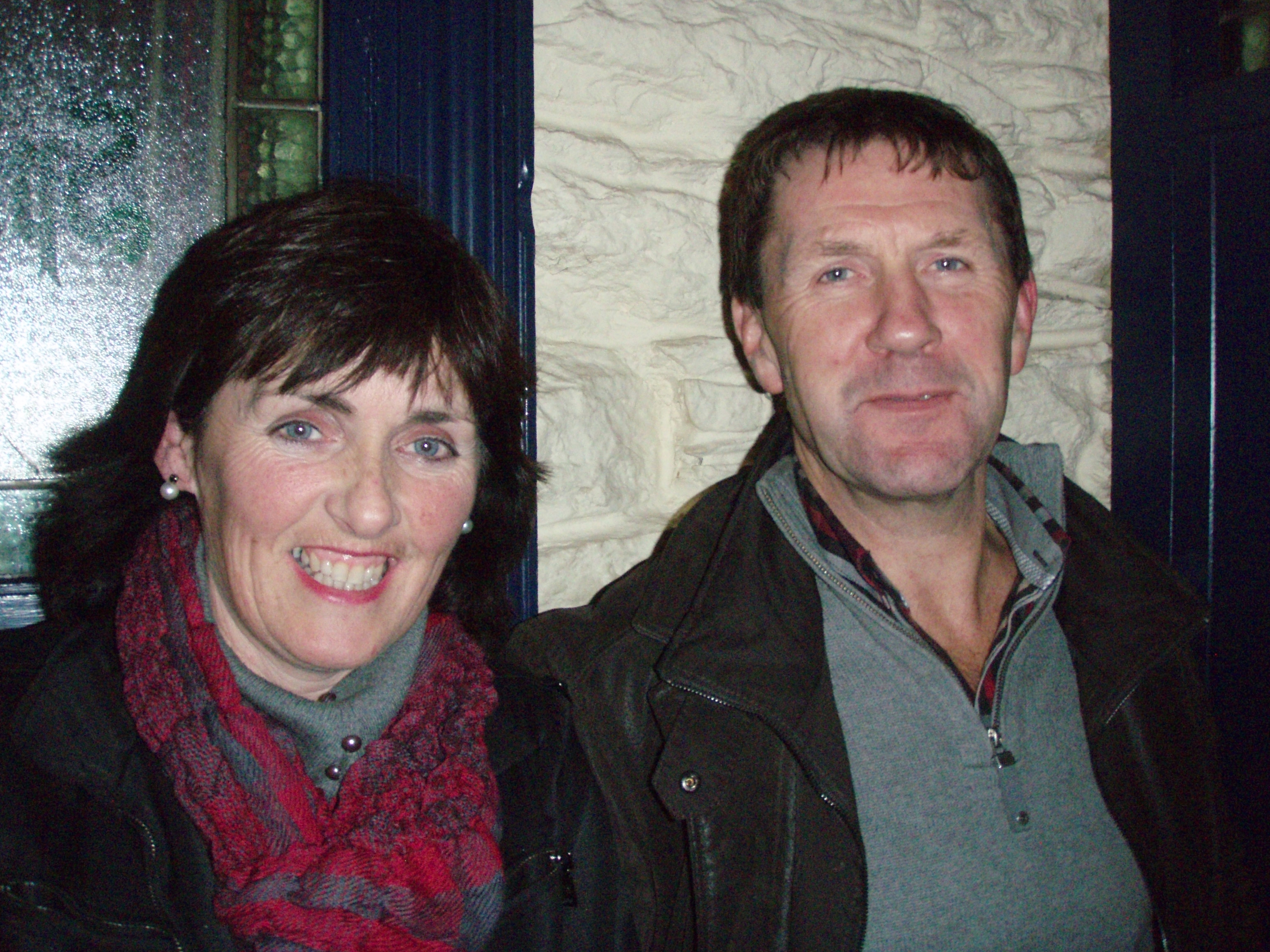
O'Connor and his wife Bridie

Jack O'Connor (born 23 October 1960) is an Irish Gaelic football manager and former player. He has been manager of the senior Kerry county team since 2021, having earlier managed it over two terms in the 2000s.

O'Connor played football with his local club, Dromid Pearses, from the 1970s until the early 2000s. As manager, he guided Kerry to five All-Ireland SFC titles: in 2004, 2006, 2009, 2022, and 2025, during his three terms as manager. Kerry also won the National Football League in all of those years

== Early life ==
Born in 1960 at Toorsaleen in Mastergeehy County Kerry. The youngest of nine children born to Michael and Síle O'Connor, he was educated locally at Caslagh national school before later attending Scoil Uí Chonaill in Cahersiveen. It was here that O'Connor's football skills were developed and he was picked for the Kerry vocational schools team in 1977 and 1978. Defeats of Kildare and Mayo respectively gave O'Connor back-to-back All-Ireland winners' medals in this competition.

After completing his secondary education O'Connor moved on to Maynooth College where he obtained a B.A, H.dip Ed in Spanish and Irish.

== Work and family ==
O'Connor's first teaching job was at Waterville Tech. He progressed from there to his alma mater, Scoil Ui Chonaill, where he remained on the teaching staff until 1999. Here O'Connor became involved in training the school's football team and he enjoyed much success as a coach. In 1997 he guided Scoil Uí Chonaill to the Kerry county title in the vocational schools championship. A Munster title quickly followed before an All-Ireland final showdown with St. Malachy's from Castlewellan. O'Connor's side were victorious on that occasion.

He managed Kerry County Vocational Schools Teams to All-Ireland wins in 1992 and 93.

The amalgamation of the three schools in Cahersiveen in 1999 led to the creation of Coláiste na Sceilge. O'Connor remained on the teaching staff while also holding on to his position as coach of the school's football team. In 1999 he guided the school to another set of county and provincial vocational titles while another All-Ireland final appearance beckoned. Holy Trinity College provided the opposition on that occasion, however, victory went to the Kerry team. In 2000 Coláiste na Sceilge made history when they retained their county, Munster and All-Ireland vocational titles.

Further success followed for O'Connor's youngsters in the early 2000s. Coláiste na Sceilge won three consecutive Corn Uí Mhuirí titles in 2001, 2002 and 2003, however, the team fell in the subsequent All-Ireland semi-final on all three occasions. After a prolonged absence O'Connor guided his school team to a fourth Corn Uí Mhuirí title in 2009. At the fourth attempt Coláiste na Sceilge reached the All-Ireland final. St Mary's of Edenderry provided the opposition, however, the Kerry youngsters were too strong and won the game by 1–9 to 0–10. It was a first Hogan Cup title for Coláiste na Sceilge.

In March 2007, O'Connor published his autobiography, Keys to the Kingdom.

He is married to Bridie (née Moriarty), and has two sons – Cian (born 1989) and Éanna (born 1992). The latter was a member of the Kerry minor football team in 2009. Cian and Éanna have both since played for Moorefield in County Kildare, and Éanna has shown interest in playing for his adopted county.

== Playing career ==
=== Club ===
O'Connor played his club football with Dromid Pearses and has enjoyed some success. As a player and a coach with the club for over twenty years he helped them progress through the ranks in Kerry football from Division 5 to Division 1.

In 1981 he was a member of the South Kerry team that reached the final of the county senior championship. On that occasion the divisional side accounted for the famed Austin Stacks club. O'Connor collected a county winners' medal as a non-playing substitute.

In 1982 O'Connor was still confined to the substitutes' bench as South Kerry contested a second consecutive county final. Feale Rangers, a division from the northern part of the county, provided the opposition. O'Connor's side were far too strong and recorded back-to-back county titles.

Three-in-a-row proved beyond O'Connor's divisional side, however, South Kerry were back in the county championship decider again in 1984 with O'Connor making it onto the starting fifteen. A Páidí Ó Sé-trained West Kerry team defeated the men from the south on that occasion.

In 1999 O'Connor captured a county novice championship title with Dromid Pearses.

== Managerial career ==
=== Kerry (first term, 2003-2006) ===
Jack became Kerry manager in the autumn of 2003, after the sacking of Páidí Ó Sé. He won the All-Ireland twice in his first term, in 2004 and 2006, defeating Mayo in the final on both occasions. Kerry also won the National Football League in both of those years, as well as reaching the final in 2005, where they lost to Tyrone. O'Connor considered resigning after Kerry's 2006 victory, although county board chairman Seán Walsh wanted him to stay on. O'Connor finally stepped down, along with his backroom staff (selectors Ger O'Keeffe and Johnny Culloty, and trainer Pat Flanagan) on 16 October 2006. His final decision to step down as the manager was said to be for personal reasons. Seán Walsh was disappointed by the final decision but made a point of acknowledging O'Connor's successes as manager. Few managers achieved his successes in such a short period of time; two all-Irelands, two Munster Championships and two National League Division One titles. O'Connor was the first Kerry manager to take Kerry to three All-Ireland finals since Mick O'Dwyer.

=== Kerins O'Rahillys ===
After taking a break from management for a year he took over Tralee club side Kerins O'Rahilly's in 2008 whom he led to the Munster Club Championship Final but lost out to Nemo Rangers of Cork. He also led them to the Kerry County Final against Mid Kerry, losing in the replay.

=== Kerry (second term, 2009-2012) ===
After Pat O'Shea's resignation as Kerry Manager he was confirmed as manager for the 2009 campaign. On 26 April 2009, he managed Kerry to win the Allianz NFL Division 1 title, beating Derry 1–15 to 0–15 in the final at Croke Park.

On 20 September 2009, he managed Kerry to win their 36th All-Ireland Senior Football title with a four-point win over Cork in Croke Park. Despite being written off by many of the games experts O'Connor's men proved their worth first with a stunning quarter-final victory over Dublin and from that point on never looked back and went on to beat Meath in the semi-final before claiming the title against Cork. O'Connor said 'There is a lot of satisfaction in this, we were being written off by many experts". On 30 August 2010, O'Connor reappointment as manager was ratified by the Kerry county committee in Tralee, which agreed to a new three-year term for the management team.

On 11 August 2012, O'Connor stepped down as Kerry manager for the second time despite pressure from the County Board for him to stay.

=== Kerry minors ===
On 31 August 2013, O'Connor was appointed as Kerry minor manager taking over from Mickey Ned O'Sullivan on a two-year term. O'Connor led Kerry to a second consecutive Munster championship in 2014, beating near rivals Cork in the final. They went on to win the All-Ireland in 2014, Kerry's first victory in the competition in 20 years, beating Donegal 0-17 to 1-10 in the final, matching their senior counterparts victory in the senior final. O'Connor's charges repeated the success in 2015, comprehensively beating Munster rivals Tipperary in both the Munster final and the All-Ireland Final, winning 2-14 to 1-11 and 4-14 to 0-6 respectively.

=== Kerry under-21s ===
In 2016, O'Connor was appointed manager of the under-21 football team. He left to manage the Kildare senior team in 2019.

=== Kildare ===
In September 2019, O'Connor was ratified as the new Kildare manager. In order to make himself available for a third term with Kerry he stepped away from his role with Kidare two years later.

=== Kerry (third term, 2021-present) ===
Jack was ratified by the Kerry County Board on 4 October 2021 to take charge of the Kerry Senior Team for the third time on a two-year term. He successfully led Kerry to an All-Ireland Final victory in 2022, and again in 2025.

== Honours ==
Inter-county

- All-Ireland Senior Football Championship (5): 2004, 2006, 2009, 2022, 2025
  - Runner-up (4): 2005, 2011, 2023, 2026
- All-Ireland Under 21 Football Championship (1): 1998
  - Runner-up (1): 1999
- All-Ireland Minor Football Championship (2): 2014, 2015
- Munster Senior Football Championship (9): 2004, 2005, 2010, 2011, 2022, 2023, 2024, 2025, 2026
- Munster Under-21 Football Championship (3): 1998, 1999, 2017
- Munster Under-20 Football Championship (1): 2018
- Munster Minor Football Championship (2): 2014, 2015
- National Football League (5): 2004, 2006, 2009, 2022, 2025

Schools

- All-Ireland Vocational Schools Championship (3): 1997, 1999, 2000
- All Ireland Colleges Hogan Cup (1): 2009
- Munster Vocational Schools Championship (3): 1997, 1999, 2000
- Kerry Vocational Schools Championship (3): 1997, 1999, 2000
- Munster Colleges A Championship (4): 2001, 2002, 2003, 2009

Achievements
Preceded by Mickey Harte	All-Ireland SFC winning manager 2004	Succeeded by Mickey Harte
Preceded by Mickey Harte	All-Ireland SFC winning manager 2006	Succeeded by Pat O'Shea
Preceded by Mickey Harte	All-Ireland SFC winning manager 2009	Succeeded by Conor Counihan
Preceded by Brian Dooher and Feargal Logan	All-Ireland SFC winning manager 2022	Succeeded by Dessie Farrell
Sporting positions
Preceded by Páidí Ó Sé	Kerry Senior Football Manager; 2003–2006	Succeeded by Pat O'Shea
Preceded by Pat O'Shea	Kerry Senior Football Manager; 2008–2012	Succeeded by Éamonn Fitzmaurice
Preceded by Cian O'Neill	Kildare Senior Football Manager; 2019–2021	Succeeded by Glenn Ryan
Preceded by Peter Keane	Kerry Senior Football Manager; 2021–	Succeeded by Incumbent
