= 1920 All-Ireland Senior Football Championship final =

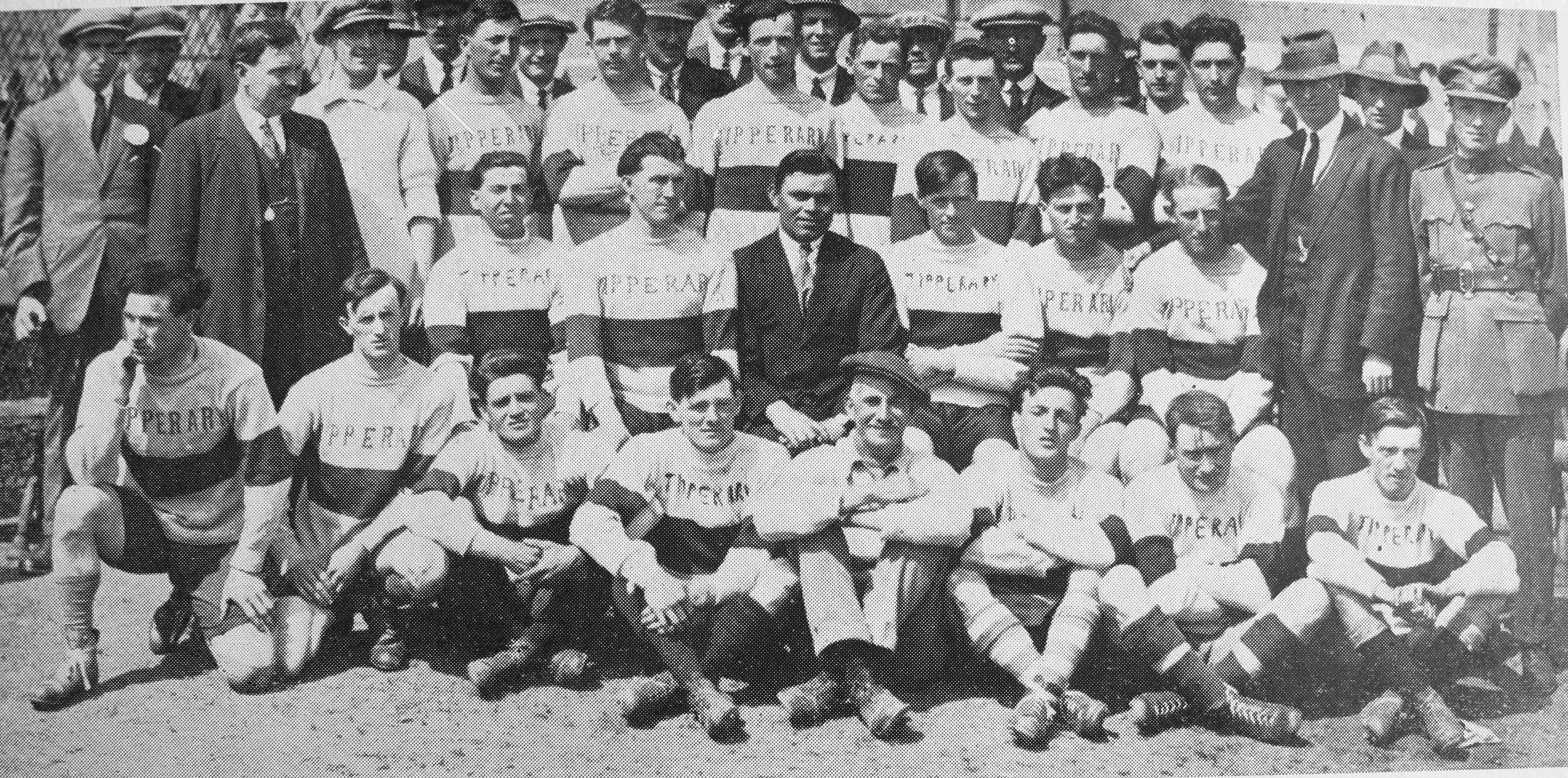
- Tipperary, champion
- Event: 1920 All-Ireland Senior Football Championship
Tipperary	Dublin
1–6 (9)	1–2 (5)
- Date: 11 June 1922
- Venue: Croke Park, Dublin
- Referee: Willie Walsh (Waterford)
- Attendance: 17,000

The 1920 All-Ireland Senior Football Championship final was the 33rd All-Ireland Final and the deciding match of the 1920 All-Ireland Senior Football Championship, an inter-county Gaelic football tournament for the top teams in Ireland.

== Pre-match ==
The final was the first time the teams had met since Bloody Sunday (21 November 1920); since then, the Anglo-Irish Treaty had been signed and 26 counties had been offered independence from British rule.

== Match ==
=== Summary ===
IRA volunteer Dan Breen, who previously fought against the British Empire during the War of Independence, threw the ball in at kickoff. The Civil War would begin just 17 days after.

Dublin were held scoreless in the second half, they had led by 1–2 to 0–3 at half-time. A late goal by Tommy Powell sealed victory for Tipperary.

It was Tipperary's fourth All-Ireland SFC title, following success in 1889, 1895 and 1900. Football later became the secondary Gaelic sport in the county, with hurling taking its place.

=== Details ===
11 June 1922
3.30 p.m.

Tipperary	1–6 – 1–2	Dublin
T Powell (1–3); V Vaughan (0–2); G McCarthy (0–1)		Frank Burke (1–0); P McDonnell (0–1); S Synott (0–1)

Croke Park, Dublin
Attendance: 17,000
Referee: Willie Walsh (Waterford)

Tipperary
Dublin

1	Arthur Carroll
Jimmy McNamara
Ned O'Shea
Dick Lannigan
Bill Ryan
6	Jerry Shelly	(c)
Bill Grant
Bill Barrett
Mick Tobin
Jim Ryan
Jimmy Doran
Gus McCarthy
Vincent Vaughan
Mick Arrigan
Tommy Powell
Manager:

1	J McDonnell
W Robbins
Joe Joyce
P Carey
Joe Synnott
Joe Norris
John Reilly
8	J Murphy
9	W Donovan
J Carey
P McDonnell	(c)
G Doyle
John Synnott
Stephen Synnott
Frank Burke
Manager:

Linesmen:

Sideline Official
