= 1918 All-Ireland Senior Football Championship final =

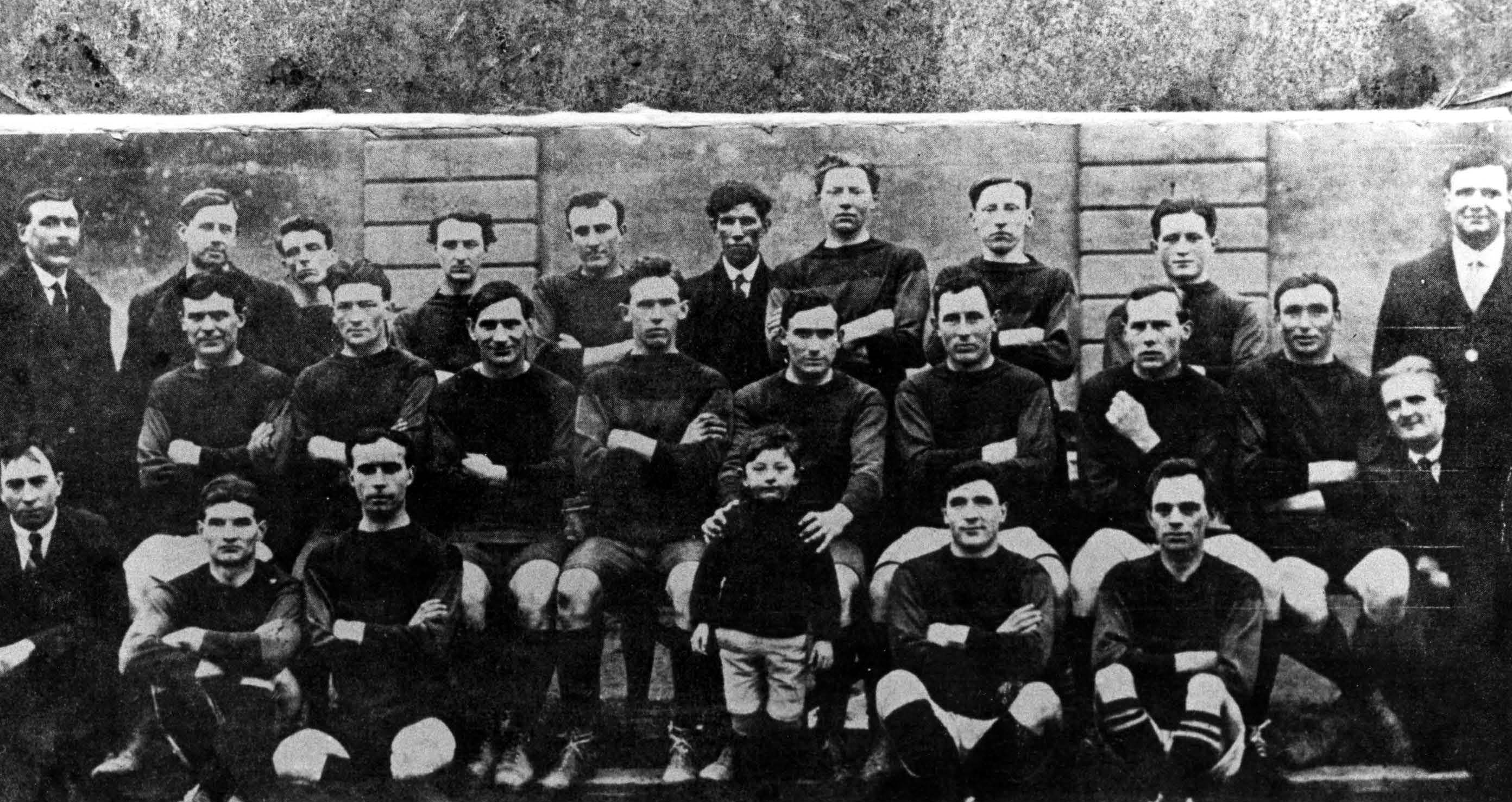
- Wexford, champions
- Event: 1918 All-Ireland Senior Football Championship
Wexford	Tipperary
0–5	0–4
- Date: 16 February 1919
- Venue: Croke Park, Dublin
- Referee: Pat Dunphy (Laois)
- Attendance: 12,000
- Weather: fine but bitterly cold

The 1918 All-Ireland Senior Football Championship final was the 31st All-Ireland Final and the deciding match of the 1918 All-Ireland Senior Football Championship, an inter-county Gaelic football tournament for the top teams in Ireland.

== Match ==
=== Summary ===
Tipperary's preparations were severely hampered by military regulations following the Soloheadbeg ambush, not to mention the death of Davey Tobin by Spanish flu. A disallowed goal and a last-minute miss by Gus McCarthy were enough to allow Wexford to complete a four-in-a-row. The match, played on 16 February 1919, had been postponed from the previous autumn due to the spread of the flu.

Leading 0-3 to 0-2 at half-time, Wexford eventually won by a point to claim their fourth of four All-Ireland SFC titles in the 1910s. They have not since appeared in an All-Ireland football final.

=== Team Details ===
Wexford	0-5 – 0-4	Tipperary
J. Redmond, P. Todd 0-2 each, J. Byrne 0-1		G. McCarthy 0-2, J. Skinner, T. Ryan 0-1 each

GK	1	Tom McGrath
RCB	2	Nick Stewart
FB	3	Paddy Mackey
LCB	4	Jem Byrne (c)
RHB	5	Tom Murphy
CHB	6	Tom Doyle
LHB	7	Martin Howlett
MF	8	Bill Hodgins
MF	9	John Doran
RHF	10	Jack Crowley
CHF	11	Rich Reynolds
LHF	12	Pierse Todd
RCF	13	Aidan Doyle
FF	14	Gus O'Kennedy
LCF	15	Jim Redmond

GK	1	Arthur Carroll
RCB	2	Jimmy McNamara
FB	3	Ned O'Shea (c)
LCB	4	Jerry Shelly
RHB	5	Bill Ryan
CHB	6	Ned Egan
LHB	7	Tommy Powell
MF	8	Tommy Ryan
MF	9	Tom Quinlan
RHF	10	Jim Ryan
CHF	11	Bill Grant
LHF	12	Jack Skinner
RCF	13	Dick Heffernan
FF	14	Gus McCarthy
LCF	15	John O'Shea

== See also ==
- 1956 All-Ireland Senior Football Championship final, also postponed due to an outbreak of infectious disease
- 2021 All-Ireland Senior Football Championship final, also postponed due to an outbreak of infectious disease
