= List of Tipperary senior Gaelic football team captains =

This article lists players who have recently captained the senior Tipperary county football team in the Munster Senior Football Championship and the All-Ireland Senior Football Championship. The captain was originally chosen from the club that had won the Tipperary Senior Football Championship; however, this method has been discontinued and the captain is now chosen by the manager.

== List of captains ==
Year	Player	Club	National titles	Provincial titles
1999	Declan Browne	Moyle Rovers		
2000	Liam Cronin	Moyle Rovers		
2001	Liam Cronin	Moyle Rovers		
2002	Damien Byrne	Fethard		
2003	Philly Ryan	Clonmel Commercials		
2004	Robbie Costigan	Cahir		
2005	Declan Browne	Moyle Rovers	Tommy Murphy Cup-winning captain	
2006	Michael Phelan	Ardfinnan		
2007	Colin Morrissey	Galtee Rovers		
2008	Aidan Foley	Moyle Rovers		
2009	Barry Grogan	Aherlow		
2010	Robbie Costigan	Cahir		
2011	Barry Grogan	Aherlow		
2012	Philip Austin	Borrisokane		
2013	Paddy Codd	Killenaule		
2014	Paddy Codd	Killenaule		
2015	Paddy Codd	Killenaule		
