= Philly Ryan (Gaelic footballer) =

Irish Tipperary Gaelic football goalkeeper (1968–2025)

Personal information
- Born: 1968 Clonmel, County Tipperary, Ireland
- Died: 18 October 2025 (aged 56–57)
- Height: 5 ft 10 in (178 cm)

Sport
- Sport: Gaelic football
- Position: Goalkeeper
Club
- Years: Club
- Clonmel Commercials
Club titles
- Tipperary titles: 5
Inter-county
- Years: County
- 1987–2003: Tipperary
Inter-county titles
- Munster titles: 0
- All-Irelands: 0
- NFL: 0
- All Stars: 0

Philip Ryan (1968 – 18 October 2025) was an Irish Gaelic football manager and goalkeeper at senior level for the Tipperary county team. He managed the Tipperary senior team from 2024 until his death in 2025.

== Playing career ==
Born in Clonmel, County Tipperary, Ryan first arrived on the inter-county scene at the age of sixteen when he linked up with the Tipperary minor team. He then joined the under-21 and junior sides. Ryan joined the senior panel during the 1987 championship.

Although a member of the Munster inter-provincial team on a number of occasions, Ryan never won a Railway Cup medal. At club level he was a five-time championship medallist with Clonmel Commercials.

Ryan retired from inter-county football following the conclusion of the 2003 championship.

== Coaching career ==
In retirement from playing Ryan became involved in team management and coaching. He served as manager of the Tipperary minor team on one occasion.

In August 2024, Ryan was named as manager of the Tipperary senior football team.

Ryan was appointed senior football manager for the 2025 season, and led Tipperary to a fifth-place finish in Division 4 of the Allianz Football League.

== Personal life ==
He underwent hip surgery in May 2025, but was back on the sideline on crutches for Tipperary's final game of the year, a Tailteann Cup defeat to Leitrim.

On 18 October 2025, Ryan died after collapsing while walking in his hometown Clonmel. He is survived by his wife Anna, his son Shane, who is the current Tipperary Senior goalkeeper, and daughters Amy and Katie.

== Honours ==
=== Player ===
Clonmel Commercials

- Tipperary Senior Football Championship (5): 1986, 1989, 1990, 1994, 2002

Tipperary

- All-Ireland Senior B Football Championship (1): 1995 (c)

Sporting positions
Preceded by Donal O'Keeffe	Tipperary Senior Football Captain; 1991	Succeeded by Brian Burke
Preceded by Damien Byrne	Tipperary Senior Football Captain; 2003	Succeeded by Robbie Costigan
Preceded by Peter Creedon	Tipperary Minor Football Manager; 2006–2008	Succeeded by David Power
Preceded by Paul Kelly	Tipperary Senior Football Manager; 2024–2025	Succeeded by Niall Fitzgerald
