= Bill Grant (Gaelic footballer) =

Tipperary Gaelic footballer

Personal information
- Native name: Liam Grant (Irish)
- Born: 26 April 1891 Templemore, County Tipperary, Ireland
- Died: 8 August 1955 (aged 64) Templemore, County Tipperary, Ireland
- Occupation: Tailor

Sport
- Sport: Gaelic football
Clubs
- Years: Club
- Templemore; Templemore-Castleiney
Club titles
- Tipperary titles: 1
Inter-county
- Years: County
- 1915–1926: Tipperary
Inter-county titles
- Munster titles: 3
- All-Irelands: 1

William Grant (26 April 1891 – 8 August 1955) was an Irish Gaelic footballer. His championship career at senior level with the Tipperary county team spanned eleven years from 1915 to 1926.

Grant made his debut on the inter-county scene at the age of twenty-four when he was selected for the Tipperary senior team. He made his debut during the 1915 championship. The highlight of his inter-county career came in 1920 when he won an All-Ireland medal. Grant also won three Munster medals.

== Honours ==
Templemore-Castleiney

- Tipperary Senior Football Championship (1): 1925

Tipperary

- All-Ireland Senior Football Championship (1): 1920
- Munster Senior Football Championship (3): 1918, 1920, 1922,
