= Niall Fitzgerald =

Tipperary Gaelic footballer

Personal information
- Native name: Niall Mac Gearailt (Irish)
- Born: 1981 (age 44–45) Clonmel, County Tipperary, Ireland

Sport
- Sport: Gaelic football
- Position: Midfield
Club
- Years: Club
- Moyle Rovers
Club titles
- Tipperary titles: 2
Inter-county
- Years: County
- 2000–2009: Tipperary
Inter-county titles
- Munster titles: 0
- All-Irelands: 0
- NFL: 0
- All Stars: 0

Niall Fitzgerald (born 1981) is an Irish Gaelic football manager and former midfielder. He has been manager of the senior Tipperary county team since 2025.

== Playing career ==
Born in Clonmel, County Tipperary, Fitzgerald first arrived on the inter-county scene at the age of seventeen when he first linked up with the Tipperary minor team before later joining the under-21 side. He joined the senior panel during the 2000 championship. Fitzgerald subsequently became a regular member of the starting fifteen and won one Tommy Murphy Cup medal.

At club level Fitzgerald is a two-time championship medallist with Moyle Rovers

Fitzgerald retired from inter-county football following the conclusion of the 2009 championship.

== Managerial career ==
On 6 November 2025, Fitzgerald was announced as the new manager of the Tipperary senior team. He replaced Philly Ryan, who died suddenly in October 2025.

== Honours ==
=== Player ===
Moyle Rovers

- Tipperary Senior Football Championship (1): 2000, 2009

Tipperary

- Tommy Murphy Cup (1): 2005
- McGrath Cup (1): 2003
