= Vincent Vaughan (Gaelic footballer) =

Tipperary Gaelic footballer (1888–1954)

Personal information
- Native name: Uinseann Ó Macháin (Irish)
- Born: 17 July 1888 Mullinahone, County Tipperary, Ireland
- Died: 30 November 1954 (aged 66) Cashel, County Tipperary, Ireland
- Occupation: Farmer

Sport
- Sport: Gaelic football
Clubs
- Years: Club
- Mullinahone; Arravale Rovers
Club titles
- Tipperary titles: 3
Inter-county
- Years: County
- 1911–1925: Tipperary
Inter-county titles
- Munster titles: 2
- All-Irelands: 1

Vincent Vaughan (17 July 1888 – 30 November 1954) was an Irish Gaelic footballer. His championship career at senior level with the Tipperary county team spanned fourteen years from 1911 to 1925.

Vaughan made his debut on the inter-county scene at the age of twenty-one when he was selected for the Tipperary junior team in 1910. He enjoyed several championship seasons with the junior team, culminating with the winning of All-Ireland medals in 1912 and 1923. By this time Vaughan had also joined the Tipperary senior team, making his debut during the 1911 championship. The highlight of his inter-county career came in 1920 when he won an All-Ireland medal. Vaughan also won two Munster medals.

== Honours ==
Mullinahone

- Tipperary Senior Football Championship (3): 1912, 1913, 1916

Tipperary

- All-Ireland Senior Football Championship (1): 1920
- Munster Senior Football Championship (2): 1920, 1922,
- All-Ireland Junior Football Championship (1): 1912, 1923
- Munster Junior Football Championship (1): 1912
