= Colm O'Flaherty =

Irish Gaelic footballer

Personal information
- Native name: Colm Ó Flatharta (Irish)
- Born: 1950 (age 75–76) Cahir, County Tipperary, Ireland

Sport
- Sport: Gaelic football
Clubs
- Years: Club
- Cahir; Fr. Griffin's
Club titles
- Galway titles: 1
Inter-county
- Years: County
- 1970-1980: Tipperary
Inter-county titles
- Munster titles: 0
- All-Irelands: 0
- NFL: 0
- All Stars: 0

Colm O'Flaherty (born 1950) is an Irish retired Gaelic footballer who played for the Tipperary and Leitrim senior teams.

Born in Cahir, County Tipperary, O'Flaherty first arrived on the inter-county scene at the age of fifteen when he first linked up with the Tipperary minor team before later joining the under-21 side. He joined the Tipperary senior panel during the 1970 championship. O'Flaherty subsequently became a regular member of the starting fifteen.

At club level O'Flaherty is a one-time championship medallist with Fr. Griffin's. He played the majority of his club football with Cahir.

O'Flaherty retired from inter-county football following the conclusion of the 1980 championship.

In retirement from playing O'Flaherty became involved in team management and coaching. He has served as a selector, coach and manager with the Tipperary minor, under-21 and senior teams in both Gaelic football and hurling.

== Honours ==
=== Player ===
Fr. Griffin's

- Galway Senior Football Championship (1): 1970

=== Selector ===
Tipperary

- National Hurling League (1): 1993-94
- Munster Minor Hurling Championship (1): 1993

Sporting positions
Preceded by Séamus McCarthy	Tipperary Under-21 Football Manager; 1999-2000	Succeeded by Noel Byrne
Preceded by Colm Browne	Tipperary Senior Football Manager; 1999-2000	Succeeded by Tom McGlinchey
