= Arthur Carroll =

Tipperary Gaelic football goalkeeper

Personal information
- Native name: Artúr Ó Cearúill (Irish)
- Born: 6 June 1893 Templemore, County Tipperary, Ireland
- Died: 22 July 1959 (aged 66) Templemore, County Tipperary, Ireland
- Occupation: Farmer

Sport
- Sport: Gaelic football
- Position: Goalkeeper
Clubs
- Years: Club
- Templemore; Templemore-Castleiney
Club titles
- Tipperary titles: 2
Inter-county
- Years: County
- 1917–1926: Tipperary
Inter-county titles
- Munster titles: 3
- All-Irelands: 1

Arthur Carroll (6 June 1893 – 22 July 1959) was an Irish Gaelic footballer. His championship career at senior level with the Tipperary county team spanned nine years from 1917 to 1926.

Carroll made his debut on the inter-county scene at the age of twenty-four when he was selected for the Tipperary senior team. He made his debut during the 1917 championship. The highlight of his inter-county career came in 1920 when he won an All-Ireland medal. Carroll also won three Munster medals.

== Honours ==
Templemore-Castleiney

- Tipperary Senior Football Championship (1): 1925, 1936

Tipperary

- All-Ireland Senior Football Championship (1): 1920
- Munster Senior Football Championship (3): 1918, 1920, 1922,
