= Mick Arrigan =

Tipperary Gaelic footballer

Personal information
- Native name: Mícheál Ó hArgáin (Irish)
- Born: 12 November 1899 Deerpark, County Tipperary, Ireland
- Died: 20 February 1958 (aged 58) Abbeyside, County Waterford, Ireland
- Occupation: Farmer

Sport
- Sport: Gaelic football
Club
- Years: Club
- Grangemockler
Club titles
- Tipperary titles: 0
Inter-county
- Years: County
- 1920–1926: Tipperary
Inter-county titles
- Munster titles: 2
- All-Irelands: 1

Michael Arrigan (12 November 1899 – 20 February 1958) was an Irish Gaelic footballer. His championship career at senior level with the Tipperary county team spanned six years from 1920 to 1926.

Arrigan made his debut on the inter-county scene at the age of twenty when he was selected for the Tipperary senior team. He made his debut during the 1920 championship, and was part of the team that won the All-Ireland Senior Football Championship in his debut season. Arrigan also won two Munster medals.

== Honours ==
Tipperary

- All-Ireland Senior Football Championship (1): 1920
- Munster Senior Football Championship (2): 1920, 1922,
