= Kevin Mulryan =

Irish Gaelic footballer (born 1981)

Personal information
- Native name: Caoimhín Ó Maoilriain (Irish)
- Born: 1981 (age 44–45) Templemore, County Tipperary, Ireland

Sport
- Sport: Gaelic football
- Position: Midfield
Club
- Years: Club
- J. K. Bracken's
Club titles
- Tipperary titles: 0
Inter-county
- Years: County
- 2001-2010: Tipperary
Inter-county titles
- Munster titles: 0
- All-Irelands: 0
- NFL: 0
- All Stars: 0

Kieran Mulryan (born 1981) is an Irish Gaelic footballer who played as a midfielder for the Tipperary senior team.

Born in Templemore, County Tipperary, Mulryan first arrived on the inter-county scene at the age of sixteen when he first linked up with the Tipperary minors teams as a dual player before later joining the under-21 sides. He made his senior debut during the 2001 championship. Mulryan immediately became a regular member of the starting fifteen and won one Tommy Murphy Cup medal.

At club level Mulryan plays both Gaelic football and hurling with J. K. Bracken's.

Mulryan retired from inter-county football on 30 December 2010.

In retirement from playing Mulryan became involved in team management and coaching. He has served as a selector with the Tipperary minor team.

== Honours ==
=== Player ===
Tipperary

- Tommy Murphy Cup (1): 2005
- McGrath Cup (1): 2003
- Munster Minor Hurling Championship (1): 1999

=== Selector ===
Tipperary

- Munster Minor Football Championship (1): 2012
