= 1976–77 National Hurling League =

46th season of the National Hurling League

League details
- Dates: 10 October 1976 – 24 April 1977

League champions
- Winners: Clare (2nd win)
- Captain: Jimmy McNamara
- Manager: Fr Harry Bohan

League runners-up
- Runners-up: Kilkenny
- Captain: Liam O'Brien
- Manager: Fr Tommy Maher

Other division winners
- Division 2: Westmeath

The 1976–77 National Hurling League was the 46th season of the National Hurling League.

== Division 1 ==
National Hurling League Division 1
- Season: 1976-77
- Champions: Clare; 2nd National League title Captain: Jimmy McNamara; Manager: Harry Bohan
- Relegated: Wicklow
- Top goalscorer: Pat Moylan (3-25); Colm Honan (1-31)
- All statistics correct as of 28 February 2017.

Kilkenny came into the season as defending champions of the 1975-76 season. Wicklow entered Division 1 as the promoted team.

On 24 April 1977, Clare won the title after a 2–8 to 0–9 win over Kilkenny in the final. It was their second league title overall and their first since 1945-46.

Wicklow were relegated from Division 1 after just one season in the top flight.

Cork's Pat Moylan and Clare's Colm Honan were the Division 1 joint-top scorers.

=== Division 1A ===
Pos	Team	Pld	W	D	L	Pts	Notes
1	Clare	6	6	0	0	12	Division 1 champions
2	Kilkenny	6	4	1	1	9	Division 1 runners-up
3	Tipperary	6	4	0	2	8	
4	Wexford	6	2	1	3	5	
5	Cork	6	2	0	4	4	
6	Limerick	6	1	2	3	4	Relegated to Division 1A
7	Dublin	6	0	0	6	0	Relegated to Division 1A

=== Group stage ===
10 October 1976	Cork	1-8 - 3-10	Kilkenny	Páirc Uí Chaoimh, Cork
	B Óg Murphy 1-1, P Moylan 0-4, G McCarthy 0-1, M Malone 0-1, C McCarthy 0-1.		E Keher 1-5, B Fitzpatrick 1-3, M Ruth 1-1, M Malone 0-1.	Referee: S O'Grady (Limerick)

17 October 1976	Kilkenny	0-16 - 0-6	Tipperary	Nowlan Park, Kilkenny
	B Fitzpatrick 0-6, M Ruth 0-3, P Delaney 0-3, K Fennelly 0-2.		Jim Kehoe 0-3, B Kenny 0-1, F Loughnane 0-1, J Gorgan 0-1.	Referee: JJ Landers (Waterford)

24 October 1976	Tipperary	2-8 - 2-7	Wexford	Ned Hall Park, Clonmel
	J Kehoe 1-2, P Fanning 1-1, J Ryan 0-3, S Hogan 0-1, P Byrne 0-1.		J Quigley 1-1, M Browne 1-0, M Butler 0-2, M Jacob 0-1, T Byrne 0-1, N Buggy 0-1.	Referee: P Cronin (Cork)

31 October 1976	Dublin	1-9 - 1-13	Kilkenny	Croke Park, Dublin
	M Holden 1-1, A English 0-3, PJ Holden 0-1, D Quinn 0-1, D Keely 0-1, J Towell 0-1, C Hennebry 0-1.		L O'Brien 0-6, T Waters 1-2, B Cody 0-1, J Morrissey 0-1, F Cummins 0-1, T Brennan 0-1, M Ruth 0-1.	Referee: G Kirwan (Offaly)

31 October 1976	Tipperary	2-8 - 2-9	Clare	MacDonagh Park, Nenagh
	T Butler 0-4, B Kenny 1-0, P Fanning 1-0, T O'Dwyer 0-2, T O'Connor 0-1, J Ryan 0-1.		C Honan 0-5, J McNamara 1-0, E O'Connor 1-0, P O'Connor 0-2, J Callinan 0-1, S Hehir 0-1.	Referee: J Rankins (Laois)

31 October 1976	Cork	2-8 - 1-10	Limerick	Páirc Uí Chaoimh, Cork
	P Moylan 1-4, T Murphy 1-0, C McCarthy 0-1, J Fenton 0-1, G McCarthy 0-1, E O'Donoghue 0-1.		E Cregan 1-6, E Grimes 0-1, J Neenan 0-1, G Moloney 0-1, S Foley 0-1.	Referee: M SLattery (Clare)

14 November 1976	Kilkenny	0-14 - 1-6	Wexford	Nowlan Park, Kilkenny
	L O'Brien 0-7, M Brennan 0-2, B Cody 0-1, B Fitzpatrick 0-1, T Waters 0-1, M Crotty 0-1, P Delaney 0-1.		M Butler 1-0, T Byrne 0-1, C Kehoe 0-1, M Jacob 0-1, J Conran 0-1, J Murphy 0-1, S Kinsella 0-1.	Referee: N Dalton (Waterford)

14 November 1976	Limerick	1-8 - 2-10	Tipperary	Gaelic Grounds, Limerick
	J Neenan 1-0, E Grimes 0-2, J McKenna 0-2, P Kelly 0-2, M Carroll 0-1, S Foley 0-1.		T Butler 1-0, M Coen 1-0, J Grogan 0-3, J Kehoe 0-2, B Kenny 0-2, P Fanning 0-2, S Hogan 0-1.	Referee: F Murphy (Cork)

14 November 1976	Clare	4-8 - 1-3	Dublin	Dr. Daly Park, Tulla
	N Casey 2-3, E O'Connor 2-0, C Honan 0-4, J Callinan 0-1.		V Holden 1-0, A English 0-1, T Naughton 0-1, P Walsh 0-1.	Referee: S O'Connor (Limerick)

28 November 1976	Dublin	3-6 - 2-10	Limerick	Croke Park, Dublin
	M Holden 1-2, Denis Murphy 1-0, H Dalton 1-0, L Walsh 0-2, M Morris 0-1, A English 0-1.		E Tuohy 1-0, P Kelly 1-0, J Neenan 0-3, E Cregan 0-3, S Foley 0-2, J Grimes 0-1, E Grimes 0-1.	Referee: G Delaney (Wicklow)

28 November 1976	Tipperary	3-9 - 3-8	Cork	Semple Stadium, Thurles
	T Butler 2-1, F Loughnane 0-4, M Coen 1-0, J Kehoe 0-2, T O'Connor 0-1, P Fanning 0-1.		J Horgan 2-0, P Moylan 0-5, E O'Donoghue 1-0, C McCarthy 0-1, J Allen 0-1, T Collins 0-1.	Referee: P Johnston (Kilkenny)

28 November 1976	Wexford	1-7 - 2-14	Clare	O'Kennedy Park, New Ross
	M Butler 1-3, M Jacob 0-2, J Murphy 0-1, J Quigley 0-1.		T Ryan 0-6, M Murphy 1-1, N Casey 1-0, E O'Connor 0-3, S Stack 0-2, P O'Connor 0-1, M Moroney 0-1.	Referee: J Murphy (Kilkenny)

5 December 1976	Clare	1-9 - 1-5	Cork	Dr. Daly Park, Tulla
	E O'Connor 1-2, C Honan 0-5, M Moroney 0-1, N Casey 0-1.		T Collins 1-0, P Moylan 0-1, J Fenton 0-1, E O'Donoghue 0-1, J Allen 0-1, C McCarthy 0-1.	Referee: D Nealon (Tipperary)

12 December 1976	Limerick	2-7 - 2-10	Clare	Gaelic Grounds, Limerick
	E Cregan 1-3, N Rea 1-0, E Grimes 0-1, J McKennan 0-1.		C Honan 1-5, E O'Connor 1-0, M Moroney 0-4, J Callinan 0-1.	Referee: J Moloney (Tipperary)

12 December 1976	Wexford	2-17 - 1-7	Dublin	Páirc Uí Shíocháin, Gorey
	P Hanrick 0-7, T Doran 1-3, J Quigley 1-1, N Quigley 0-3, N Buggy 0-2, C Keogh 0-1.		V Holden 1-2, A English 0-2, L Walsh 0-2, H Dalton 0-1.	Referee: G Kirwan (Offaly)

30 January 1977	Clare	3-11 - 1-8	Kilkenny	Dr. Daly Park, Tulla
	P O'Connor 2-2, N Casey 1-0, C Honan 0-3, M Moroney 0-2, J Callinan 0-2, T Ryan 0-1, G Loughnane 0-1.		L O'Brien 0-5, P Delaney 1-1, M Grennan 0-2.	Referee: S O'Connor (Limerick)

30 January 1977	Limerick	2-6 - 1-9	Wexford	Gaelic Grounds, Limerick
	L O'Donoghue 1-1, E Cregan 0-4, J McKenna 1-0, E Grimes 0-1.		P Hannrick 0-4, M Butler 1-0, N Buggy 0-2, M Quigley 0-1, T Doran 0-1, L Conran 0-1.	Referee: M Slattery (Clare)

30 January 1977	Cork	0-11 - 1-7	Dublin	Páirc Uí Chaoimh, Cork
	P Moylan 0-6, J Barry-Murphy 0-2, D Coughlan 0-1, M malone 0-1, B Murphy 0-1.		S Kinsella 1-1, H Dalton 0-3, L Walsh 0-1, P Carton 0-1, M Bermingham 0-1.	Referee: J Landers (Waterford)

20 February 1977	Wexford	2-15 - 4-8	Cork	Wexford Park, Wexford
	N Buggy 0-7, P Hanrick 0-5, M Quigley 1-0, T Doran 1-0, M Butler 0-2, M Casey 0-1.		P Moylan 2-5, M Malone 1-1, J Barry-Murphy 1-0, T Cashman 0-2.	Referee: N Dalton (Waterford)

20 February 1977	Kilkenny	1-12 - 2-9	Limerick	Nowlan Park, Kilkenny
	P Delaney 1-0, M Brennan 0-3, E Keher 0-3, M Ruth 0-2, K Brennan 0-2, L O'Brien 0-1, F Cummins 0-1.		E Grimes 1-1, E Cregan 0-4, N Rea 1-0, P Hartigan 0-1, G Moloney 0-1, L O'Donoghue 0-1, M Carroll 0-1.	Referee: G Ryan (Tipperary)

20 February 1977	Dublin	1-7 - 3-14	Tipperary	Croke Park, Dublin
	V Holden 1-3, M Reidy 0-2, J Towell 01-, H Dalton 0-1.		T O'Dwyer 1-1, P Fanning 1-1, J Kehoe 0-4, T Butler 0-4, B Kenny 1-0, S Hogan 0-2, P Fitzelle 0-2.	Referee: G Kirwan (Offaly)

=== Division 1B ===
Pos	Team	Pld	W	D	L	Pts	Notes
1	Offaly	6	5	1	0	11	Promoted to Division 1A
2	Galway	6	5	0	1	10	Promoted to Division 1A
3	Kildare	6	4	0	2	8	
4	Waterford	6	3	1	2	7	
5	Laois	6	2	0	4	4	
6	Antrim	6	1	0	5	2	
7	Wicklow	6	0	0	6	0	Relegated to Division 2

=== Group stage ===
10 October 1976	Laois	0-10 - 3-11	Waterford	O'Moore Park, Portlaoise
	P Dillon 0-6, A Lanham 0-2, M Ahern 0-1, M Mahon 0-1.		M Hickey 2-0, M Walsh 1-1, M Whelan 0-3, J Galvin 0-2, D Fitzpatrick 0-2, J Dalton 0-1, J Brick 0-1, L Ahern 0-1.	Referee: M Kelleher (Kildare)

17 October 1976	Offaly	1-12 - 1-11	Laois	St. Brendan's Park, Birr
	PJ Whelehan 0-5, P Delaney 0-4, J Kelly 1-0, P Hoctor 0-2, B Coulihan 0-1.		P Dillon 0-4, M Dunphy 0-2, P Dowling 0-2, M Mahon 0-1, M Cuddy 0-1, A Lanham 0-1.	Referee: P Robinson (Galway)

17 October 1976	Antrim	2-9 - 2-7	Wicklow	Corrigan Park, Belfast
	E Donnelly 2-4, A Hamill 0-2, J O'Neill 0-1, P Doyle 0-1, R McDonnell 0-1.		S Doyle 1-1, G Byrne 1-0, T Collins 0-3, J Reilly 0-1, M Hogan 0-1, S Kehoe 0-1.	Referee: M Slattery (Clare)

24 October 1976	Wicklow	0-1 - 0-3	Offaly	Aughrim County Ground, Aughrim
	J Reilly 0-1.		P Delaney 0-1, P Carroll 0-1, PJ Whelehan 0-1.	Referee: N Matthews (Wexford)

31 October 1976	Laois	2-11 - 2-8	Antrim	O'Moore Park, Portlaoise
	A Lanham 2-0, P Dillon 0-5, P Kelly 0-2, M Mahon 0-2, M Walsh 0-1, M Brophy 0-1.		E Donnelly 2-3, P Boyle 0-2, R McDonald 0-1, B McGarry 0-1, J Fagan 0-1.	Referee: D Nealon (Tipperary)

31 October 1976	Kildare	2-7 - 1-13	Offaly	Sallins Road, Naas
	T Carew 2-0, J Walsh 0-5, M Deely 0-1, B Burke 0-1.		P Delaney 0-8, J Fleury 1-0, P Horan 0-1, J Kelly 0-1, E Coughlan 0-1, PJ Whelehan 0-1, D Egan 0-1.	Referee: N Donoghue (Dublin)

31 October 1976	Wicklow	1-5 - 3-11	Galway	Aughrim County Ground, Aughrim
	S Doyle 1-1, J Reilly 0-1, D Foley 0-1, Pat Brennan 0-1, T Sullivan 0-1.		A Furey 1-4, G Holland 1-2, P Fahy 1-0, PJ Molloy 0-1, Joe Connolly 0-1, M Connolly 0-1, John Connolly 01-, S Murphy 0-1.	Referee: P Johnston (Kilkenny)

14 November 1976	Offaly	1-11 -2-8	Waterford	St. Brendan's Park, Birr
	M Cleere 1-0, P Delaney 0-3, P Horan 0-3, B Coolahan 0-2, PJ Whelehan 0-2, P Hoctor 0-1.		D Fitzpatrick 0-6, J Galvin 1-0, A Heffernan 1-0, L Aherne 0-1, M Whelan 0-1.

14 November 1976	Galway	3-14 - 4-5	Laois	Duggan Park, Ballinasloe
	G Holland 1-3, F Burke 1-1, P Fahy 1-0, PJ Molloy 0-3, T Furey 0-3, V Mullins 0-2, I Clarke 0-1, M Connolly 0-1.		A Lanham 2-1, P Dillon 0-4, M Walsh 1-0, P Kelly 1-0.	Referee: S O'Meara (Tipperary)

14 November 1976	Antrim	3-4 - 2-11	Kildare	Corrigan Park, Belfast
	R McDonnell 1-0, A Thornbury 1-0, B McGarry 1-0, E Donnelly 0-3, S McFadden 0-1.		M Deely 2-1, B Burke 0-4, E Walsh 0-3, J Walsh 0-3.	Referee: M Slattery (Clare)

28 November 1976	Waterford	3-7 - 1-8	Antrim	Fraher Field, Dungarvan
	A Heffernan 2-0, L Ahearne 1-1, B Fitzpatrick 0-3, J Galvin 0-2, M Hickey 0-1.		V Denny 1-1, B Donnelly 0-3, A McCallin 0-2, P Doherty 0-1, C Ward 0-1.	Referee: N Matthews (Wexford)

28 November 1976	Laois	2-10 - 3-3	Wicklow	O'Moore Park, Portlaoise
	A Lanham 2-0, P Dillon 0-6, M Ahearne 0-2, M Walsh 0-1, P Dolwing 0-1.		M Hogan 2-0, P Kehoe 1-0, T Finn 0-2, S Kehoe 0-1.

28 November 1976	Kildare	1-9 - 1-11	Galway	St. Conleth's Park, Newbridge
	P Walsh 0-5, L O'Leary 1-1, T Carew 0-1, N Walsh 0-1, P White 0-1.		John Connolly 1-2, PJ Molloy 0-3, F Burke 0-3, Joe Connolly 0-1, PJ Qualter 0-1, T Furey 0-1.	Referee: C Foley (Dublin)

12 December 1976	Galway	2-14 -0-7	Antrim	Duggan Park, Ballinasloe
	PJ Qualter 1-2, PJ Molloy 1-1, F Burke 0-3, T O'Donoghue 0-2, G Holland 0-2, J Connolly 0-2, M Connolly 0-1, T Brehony 0-1.		E Donnelly 0-4, J Fagan 0-1, J Crossey 0-1, A McCallin 0-1.	Referee: S O'Meara (Tipperary)

12 December 1976	Waterford	2-8- 2-13	Kildare	Fraher Field, Dungarvan
	J Greene 1-1, A Heffernan 1-0, D Fitzpatrick 0-2, M Hickey 0-2, S Brick 0-1, J Galvin 0-1, M Whelan 0-1.		M Moore 1-3, J Walsh 0-5, M Deely 1-1, M Power 0-1, N Walsh 0-1, B Burke 0-1, J O'Leary 0-1.	Referee: S Meally (Kilkenny)

30 January 1977	Galway	2-17 - 1-3	Waterford	Duggan Park, Ballinasloe
	V Mullins 0-5, Joe Connolly 1-0, PJ Qualter 1-0, F Burke 0-3, PJ Molloy 0-3, M Connolly 0-1.		P McGrath 1-0, D Fitzpatrick 0-2, A Heffernan 0-1.	Referee: J Moloney (Tipperary)

20 February 1977	Offaly	2-6 - 1-5	Galway	St. Brendan's Park, Birr
	P Delaney 1-3, PJ Whelehan 1-1, M Cleere 0-1, P Carroll 0-1.		PJ Qualter 1-0, Joe Connolly 0-2, John Connolly 0-1, M Connolly 0-1, F Burke 0-1.	Referee: P Johnston (Kilkenny)

20 February 1977	Waterford	4-19 - 2-6	Wicklow	Portlaw SPortsfield, Portlaw
	D Fitzpatrick 1-10, H Maher 2-2, B Landers 1-2, M Ormonde 0-1, N Connors 0-1, M Walsh 0-1, P McGrath 0-1, M Whelan 0-1.		G Doyle 1-2, M Doyle 1-0, S Doyle 0-2, G Bynre 0-1, J O'Reilly 0-1.	Referee: P Cronin (Cork)

20 February 1977	Kildare	1-10 - 1-4	Laois	Sallins Road, Naas
	J Walsh 0-6, M Moore 1-1, J O'Leary 1-0, M Deely 0-1, B Burke 0-1, M Power 0-1,		A Monaghan 1-0, P Dillon 0-2, P Kearnan 0-2.	Referee: G Delaney (Wicklow)

27 February 1977	Antrim	1-6 - 3-8	Offaly	Corrigan Park, Belfast
	A Hamill 0-4, R McDonnell 1-0, E Donnelly 0-1, P Boyle 0-1.		E Coughlan 1-0, PJ Whelehan 1-0, P Hoctor 1-0, P Delaney 0-3, P Horan 0-2, J Kelly 0-2, P Carroll 0-1.	Referee: N O'Donoghue (Dublin)

27 February 1977	Wicklow	3-3 - 1-12	Kildare	Carnew
	M Hogan 2-0, M Doyle 1-0, S O'Brien 0-2, J Reilly 0-1.		T Carew 1-1, J Walsh 0-4, J O'Leary 0-2, P Connolly 0-2, T White 0-1, G Tiernan 0-1, M Deely 0-1.	Referee: M Bowe (Wexford)

=== Play-off ===
13 March 1977 Play-off	Cork	1-10 - 1-8	Limerick	Semple Stadium, Thurles
	S O'Leary 1-1, C McCarthy 0-4, M Malone 0-3, T Crowley 0-1, T Cashman 0-1.		W Fitzmaurice 1-0, J Foley 0-2, L O'Donoghue 0-1, J McKenna 0-1, E Cregan 0-1, J Neenan 0-1, L Grimes 0-1, P Hartigan 0-1.	Referee: JJ Landers (Waterford)

=== Knock-out stage ===
Quarter-finals

13 March 1977 Quarter-final	Galway	0-12 - 0-12	Tipperary	Croke Park, Dublin
	PJ Molloy 0-6, F Burke 0-2, P Fahy 0-2, V Mullins 0-1, J Connolly 0-1.		P Butler 0-4, P Fitzell 0-2, M Doyle 0-2, B Kenny 0-1, P Fanning 0-1, J Keogh 0-1, T O'Connor 0-1.	Referee: P Johnston (Kilkenny)

27 March 1977 Quarter-final replay	Tipperary	1-11 - 1-7	Galway	Gaelic Grounds, Limerick
	T Butler 1-4, P Fitzell 0-2, P Quigley 0-2, T o'Dwyer 0-1, P Fanning 0-1, M Doyle 0-1.		PJ Qualter 1-0, P Fahy 0-3, PJ Molloy 0-3, V Mullins 0-1.	Referee: F Murphy (Cork)

27 March 1977 Quarter-final	Offaly	1-12 - 1-8	Wexford	Nowlan Park, Kilkenny
	P Delaney 0-5, P Carroll 1-1, P Horan 0-2, M Cleere 0-2, J Kelly 0-1, PJ Whelehan 0-1.		D Bernie 0-4, M Casey 1-0, P Handrick 0-2, T Doran 0-1, N Buggy 0-1.	Referee: P Johnston (Kilkenny)

Semi-finals

10 April 1977 Semi-final	Clare	2-15 – 0-7	Offaly	Semple Stadium, Thurles
	J Callanan 1-2, C Honan 0-5, N Casey 1-0, S Stack 0-3, M Moroney 0-2, J McNamara 0-2, P O'Connor 0-1.		PJ Whelehan 0-2, M Cleere 0-2, P Carroll 0-1, P Delaney 0-1, J Kelly 0-1.	Referee: S O'Grady (Limerick)

10 April 1977 Semi-final	Kilkenny	3-12 – 2-9	Tipperary	Semple Stadium, Thurles
	M Brennan 1-1, M Crotty 1-1, E Keher 0-4, L O'Brien 0-4, M Ruth 1-0, F Cummins 0-2.		P Quigley 1-3, J Keogh 1-0, T Butler 0-3, P Fitzelle 0-2, M Doyle 0-1.	Referee: N Dalton (Waterford)

Final

24 April 1977 Final	Kilkenny	0-9 – 2-8	Clare	Semple Stadium, Thurles
	E Keher 0-3, M Brennan 0-3, T Delaney 0-1, M Ruth 0-1, M Crotty 0-1.		T Crowe 1-1, C Honan 0-4, J McNamara 1-0, N Casey 0-1, M Moroney 0-1, E O'Connor 0-1.	Attendance: 24,500; Referee: G Kirwan (Offaly)

=== Scoring statistics ===
Top scorers overall

Rank	Player	Team	Tally	Total	Matches	Average
1	Pat Moylan	Cork	3-25	34	7	4.85
1	Colm Honan	Clare	1-31	34	7	4.85
3	Pat Delaney	Offaly	1-28	31	8	3.87
4	Declan Fitzpatrick	Waterford	1-25	28	6	4.66
5	Tommy Butler	Tipperary	4-16	28	8	3.50
6	Eddie Donnelly	Antrim	4-15	27	6	4.50
6	Éamonn Cregan	Limerick	2-21	27	7	3.85
6	Pat Dillon	Laois	0-27	27	6	4.50
9	P. J. Molloy	Galway	1-20	23	8	2.87
9	Johnny Walsh	Kildare	0-23	23	5	4.60
9	Liam O'Brien	Kilkenny	0-23	23	7	3.28

Top scorers in a single game

Rank	Player	Team	Tally	Total	Opposition
1	Declan Fitzpatrick	Waterford	1-10	13	Wicklow
2	Pat Moylan	Cork	2-05	11	Wexford
3	Eddie Donnelly	Antrim	2-04	10	Wicklow
4	Noel Casey	Clare	2-03	9	Dublin
4	Eddie Donnelly	Antrim	2-03	9	Laois
4	Éamonn Cregan	Limerick	1-06	9	Cork
7	Pat O'Connor	Clare	2-02	8	Kilkenny
7	Hugh Maher	Waterford	2-02	8	Wicklow
7	Eddie Keher	Kilkenny	1-05	8	Cork
7	Colm Honan	Clare	1-05	8	Limerick
7	Pat Delaney	Offaly	0-08	8	Kildare

== Division 2 ==
National Hurling League Division 2
- Season: 1975-76
- Champions: Westmeath
- All statistics correct as of 28 February 2017.

On 20 February 1977, Westmeath won the title after a 5–14 to 0–7 win over Meath in the final round of the group stage.

=== Division 2 table ===
Pos	Team	Pld	W	D	L	Pts	Notes
1	Westmeath	5	5	0	0	10	Division 2 champions
2	Kerry	5	4	0	1	8	
3	Down	5	3	0	2	6	
4	Carlow	5	1	0	4	2	
5	Meath	5	1	0	4	2	
6	Roscommon	5	1	0	4	0	
