= Tommy Powell (Gaelic footballer) =

Tipperary Gaelic footballer

Personal information
- Native name: Tomás Mac Giolla Phóil (Irish)
- Born: 28 October 1894 Clonmel, County Tipperary, Ireland
- Died: 24 June 1964 (aged 69) Abbeyside, County Waterford, Ireland
- Occupation: Ironmonger

Sport
- Sport: Gaelic football
- Position: Left wing-back
Club
- Years: Club
- Clonmel Commercials
Club titles
- Tipperary titles: 0
Inter-county
- Years: County
- 1918–1923: Tipperary
Inter-county titles
- Munster titles: 3
- All-Irelands: 1

Thomas Powell (28 October 1894 – 24 June 1964) was an Irish Gaelic footballer. His championship career at senior level with the Tipperary county team spanned six years from 1920 to 1926. Powell was a member of the Tipperary team that played on Bloody Sunday.

== Career ==
Powell made his debut on the inter-county scene at the age of nineteen when he was selected for the Tipperary junior team. After an unsuccessful season with the junior team, he later joined the Tipperary senior team and made his debut during the 1918 championship. The highlight of Powell's inter-county career came in when he was part of the Tipperary team that won the 1920 All-Ireland final. Powell was the stand out player in the game, scoring 1–3 of Tipperary's 1–6 in their victory over Dublin. His late goal was critical.

== Honours ==
Tipperary

- All-Ireland Senior Football Championship (1): 1920
- Munster Senior Football Championship (3): 1918, 1920, 1922
