= Benny Hahessy =

Irish Gaelic footballer

Personal information
- Native name: Beircheart Ó hAitheasa (Irish)
- Born: 1972 (age 53–54) Carrick-on-Suir, County Tipperary, Ireland

Sport
- Sport: Gaelic football
- Position: Left wing-forward
Club
- Years: Club
- Carrick Swans
Club titles
- Tipperary titles: 0
Inter-county
- Years: County
- 1997-2005: Tipperary
Inter-county titles
- Munster titles: 0
- All-Irelands: 0
- NFL: 0
- All Stars: 0

Benny Hahessy (born 1972) is an Irish retired Gaelic footballer who played as a left wing-forward for the Tipperary senior team.

Born in Carrick-on-Suir, County Tipperary, Hahessy first arrived on the inter-county scene at the age of sixteen when he first linked up with the Tipperary minor team before later joining the under-21 and junior sides. He joined the senior panel during the 1997 championship. Hahessy subsequently became a regular member of the starting fifteen and won one Tommy Murphy Cup medal.

At club level Hahessy played with Carricks Swans.

Hahessy retired from inter-county football following the conclusion of the 2005 championship.

== Honours ==
=== Player ===
Tipperary

- Tommy Murphy Cup (1): 2005
- McGrath Cup (1): 2003
