= Éamonn Corcoran =

Irish hurler

Personal information
- Native name: Éamonn Ó Corcráin (Irish)
- Born: 17 October 1977 (age 49) Templemore, County Tipperary
- Height: 6 ft 0 in (183 cm)

Sport
- Sport: Hurling
- Position: Right wing-back
Club
- Years: Club
- J.K. Bracken's GAC
Inter-county
| Years | County | Apps (scores) |
| 1999-2008 | Tipperary | 43 (0-04) |
Inter-county titles
- Munster titles: 2
- All-Irelands: 1
- NHL: 3
- All Stars: 1

Éamonn Corcoran (born 17 October 1977 in Templemore, County Tipperary) is an Irish sportsperson. He plays hurling with his local club J.K. Bracken's GAC. He was a member of the Tipperary GAA senior inter-county team from 1999 until 2008.

== Early life ==
Éamonn Corcoran was born in Templemore, County Tipperary in 1977 . From an early age he showed great skill at the game of hurling. Corcoran began his hurling career with Scoil Colmchille Primary School where he won county honours. From here Corcoran later went to Our Lady's Secondary School, Templemore where his hurling skills were further developed. Here he won an All-Ireland Colleges' B Championship medal. In 1997 Corcoran began studying at the Waterford Institute of Technology. Here he had more hurling success, winning an All-Ireland Freshers medal together with an All-Ireland Senior League medal. In 1999 and 2000 he won back-to-back Fitzgibbon Cup and All-Ireland Senior League medals with the college. Corcoran was named the player of the tournament in both Fitzgibbon Cup tournaments playing at centre-back.

== Playing career ==
=== Club ===
Corcoran plays his club hurling with the famous J.K. Bracken's club in Templemore.

=== Inter-county ===
Corcoran played minor and under-21 hurling with Tipperary for several years without success. He quickly joined the senior team, winning a National Hurling League medal in 1999. Later that summer he made his championship hurling debut in a Munster Championship game against Kerry. Two years later in 2001 Corcoran captured his second National League medal with Tipp. Later that same year he won his first Munster medal before later winning his first All-Ireland medal following a win over Galway. Corcoran's performance throughout the championship also earned him an All-Star award. Corcoran was part of the Tipperary team who won the league championship in 2008, his third league medal. His two top fans are Damien Byrne and Patrick Fennell. Corcoran retired from the inter-county scene in January 2009. He is one of the best takers of sideline cuts in the game.
