= Paddy Morrissey =

Irish Gaelic footballer (born 1955)

Personal information
- Native name: Padraig Ó Muireasa (Irish)
- Born: 1955 (age 70–71) Bansha, County Tipperary, Ireland

Sport
- Sport: Gaelic football
- Position: Right wing-back
Club
- Years: Club
- Galtee Rovers
Club titles
- Tipperary titles: 3
Inter-county
- Years: County
- 1977-1984: Tipperary
Inter-county titles
- Munster titles: 0
- All-Irelands: 0
- NFL: 0
- All Stars: 0

Paddy Morrissey (born 1955) is an Irish retired Gaelic footballer who played for the Tipperary senior team.

Born in Bansha, County Tipperary, Morrissey first arrived on the inter-county scene at the age of seventeen when he first linked up with the Tipperary minor team before later joining the under-21 and junior sides. He joined the Tipperary senior panel during the 1976 championship. Morrissey subsequently became a regular member of the starting fifteen.

At club level Morrissey is a three-time championship medallist with Galtee Rovers.

Morrissey retired from inter-county football following the conclusion of the 1984 championship.

In retirement from playing Morrissey became involved in team management and coaching. He served as a selector with the Tipperary minor and junior teams before taking charge of the senior team as manager.

== Honours ==
=== Player ===
Galtee Rovers

- Tipperary Senior Football Championship (3): 1976, 1980, 1981

Sporting positions
Preceded by Séamus MCarthy	Tipperary Senior Football Manager; 1996-1997	Succeeded by Colm Browne
