= Declan Browne =

Irish Gaelic football player

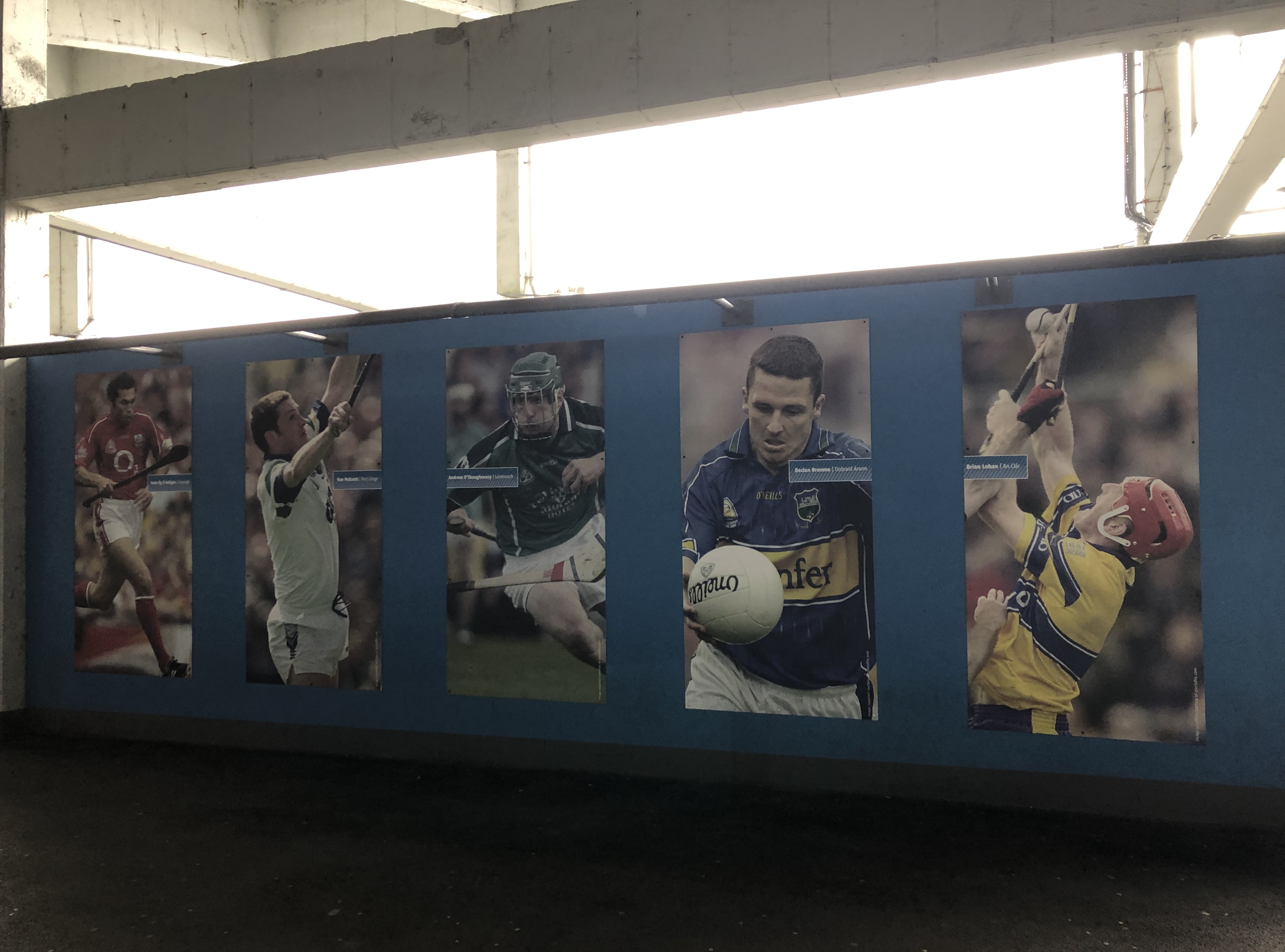

Personal information
- Native name: Déaglan de Brun (Irish)
- Born: 16 June 1978 (age 48) Tipperary, Ireland
- Height: 5 ft 8 in (173 cm)

Sport
- Sport: Gaelic football
- Position: Forward
Club
- Years: Club
- ? 1995–present: Moyle Rovers
Club titles
- Tipperary titles: 7 (senior football); 2 (junior hurling)
- Munster titles: 1 (junior hurling)
Inter-county**
Years	County	Apps (scores)
1996–2007	Tipperary	25 (9-140)
Inter-county titles
- All Stars: 2
- **Inter County team apps and scores correct as of (20:47, 3 June 2007 (UTC)).

Declan Browne (born 16 June 1978) is an Irish Gaelic football coach and player who competed at inter-county level for Tipperary for 11 years. He currently plays his club football for Moyle Rovers. He represented Ireland against Australia in the 2003 and 2004 International Rules series.

== Playing career ==
Browne made his championship debut in 1996 in a Munster championship game against Kerry. Browne received Tipperary's first football All-Star in 1998 when he was picked at corner-forward after leading the Tipperary team to the Munster Football Final. Browne won his second All-Star award in 2003. He has won seven Tipperary Senior Football Championship medals with his club, Moyle Rovers. He won a Munster Minor Football Championship medal in 1995, a Munster and All Ireland Minor Hurling medal in 1996 and a Munster U-21 Hurling medal in 1999 as well as a McGrath Cup medal in 2003 and was awarded the Munster footballer of the year award for that same year. He also won 2 Fitzgibbon Cup medals. Browne captained Tipperary to win the 2005 Tommy Murphy Cup. In 2007, he announced his retirement from the inter-county scene, following Tipperary's defeat by Clare in the Tommy Murphy Cup.

== Management ==
Browne took over as the manager of the Tipperary Under-21 Football team in September 2016. His first game in charge was against Limerick on 8 March 2017 in the Munster Under-21 Football Championship which Tipperary lost 0–14 to 0–16.

In January 2021, Browne joined the Tipperary senior football management team as the forwards coach.

== Career statistics ==
Team	Year	National League			Munster		All-Ireland		Total	
Team	Year	Division	Apps	Score	Apps	Score	Apps	Score	Apps	Score
Tipperary	1996	Division 4			1	0-00	-		1	0-00
Tipperary	1997	Group D			3 (?)	1-10	-		3	1-10
Tipperary	1998	Division 2 Group B			4	2-29	-		4	2-29
Tipperary	1999	Division 2 Group B			1	0-04	-		1	0-04
Tipperary	2000	Not played			1	0-08	-		1	0-08
Tipperary	2001	-								
Tipperary	2002	Division 2 Group B			4	2-20	1	0-07	5	2-27
Tipperary	2003	Division 2 Group B			2	1-16	2	1-18	4	2-34
Tipperary	2004	Division 2 Group B	6	2-48	1	1-03	-		7	3-51
Tipperary	2005	Division 2 Group B	4	0-07	1	0-09	1	1-02	6	1-18
Tipperary	2006	Division 2 Group B	7	2-31	1	0-05	1	0-04	9	2-40
Tipperary	2007	Division 2 Group B			1	0-05	-		1	0-05
Total					20	7-109	5	2-31	25	9-141

== Honours ==
Moyle Rovers

- 7 Tipperary Senior Football Championship 199,5 1996, 1998, 1999, 2000, 2007, 2009
- 2 Tipperary Junior Hurling Championship 1998, 2007

Tipperary

- 1 Munster Junior Club Hurling Championship
- 1 Munster Minor Hurling Championship: 1996
- 1 All-Ireland Minor Hurling Championship: 1996
- 1 Munster Minor Football Championship: 1995
- 1 McGrath Cup: 2003
- 1 Munster Intermediate Hurling Championship: 2000
- 1 All-Ireland Intermediate Hurling Championship: 2000
- 1 Tommy Murphy Cup: 2005
- 1 Munster Under-21 Hurling Championship: 1999

Waterford Institute of Technology

- 2 Fitzgibbon Cup: 1999 2000

Munster

- 1 Railway Cup: 1999

Individual

- 2 All Stars Awards 1998 2003
