= Tom McGlinchey =

Irish Gaelic footballer and manager from County Cork

Personal information
- Native name: Tomás Mag Loingsigh (Irish)
- Born: 1972 (age 53–54) Mourneabbey, County Cork, Ireland
- Occupation: Garda Síochána

Sport
- Sport: Gaelic football
Club management
- Years: Club
- 2007: Ballylanders
Inter-county management
- Years: Team
- 2000–2003 2014–2018: Tipperary; Waterford

Thomas "Tom" McGlinchey (born 1972) is an Irish Gaelic football manager and former dual player of football and hurling.

== Career ==
Born in Mourneabbey, County Cork, McGlinchey played both Gaelic football and hurling for Clyda Rovers.

In retirement from playing McGlinchey became involved in team management and coaching. At club level he coached Ballylanders, while at inter-county level he was manager of the Limerick minor and under-21 teams, as well as the Tipperary and Waterford senior teams.

In October 2018, McGlinchey was appointed manager of the Tipperary under-20s. In February 2021, his successor in that role was appointed.

== Trial and Acquittal ==
Tom McGlinchey is a member of An Garda Síochána, the police force of the Republic of Ireland. He is currently stationed in Murroe Garda Station, County Limerick. Garda McGlinchey came to national prominence in 2025 as one of five Garda members, along with a retired superintendent and three fellow serving Gardaí, charged with attempting to pervert the course of justice in connection with alleged interference in road traffic prosecutions between October 2016 and September 2019.

In November 2025, McGlinchey, together with retired Superintendent Eamon O’Neill, Sergeants Michelle Leahy and Anne-Marie Hassett, and Garda Colm Geary, appeared before Limerick Circuit Criminal Court on a total of 39 charges alleging they unlawfully intervened in or attempted to influence the prosecution of fixed charge penalty notices for road traffic offences such as speeding, not wearing seat-belts, driving without insurance, and using a mobile phone while driving.

The charges stemmed from an investigation by the Garda National Bureau of Criminal Investigation into whether the accused improperly “squared away” alleged motoring offences on behalf of motorists, including passing on communications between individuals and detecting Gardaí.

At trial, McGlinchey pleaded not guilty, with his defence counsel stating that he simply passed on messages from Superintendent O’Neill and had “nothing to hide,” having voluntarily provided his phone and PIN to investigators.

By January 2026, closing arguments were presented, with the prosecution asserting that the actions represented a perversion of justice, and the defense arguing that what occurred were routine communications and discretion in traffic enforcement, that did not amount to criminal conduct. On 26 January 2026, the jury returned a not guilty verdict on all counts.

== Honours ==
=== Coach ===
Ballylanders

- Limerick Senior Football Championship (1): 2007

Sporting positions
Preceded by Colm O'Flaherty	Tipperary Senior Football Manager; 2000–2003	Succeeded by Andy Shortall
Preceded by Gerard O'Connor	Limerick Minor Football Manager; 2010-2012	Succeeded by Gerry O'Sullivan
Preceded by John Cummins	Limerick Under-21 Football Manager; 2012–2013	Succeeded by Diarmuid Sheehy
Preceded by Niall Carew	Waterford Senior Football Manager; 2014–2018	Succeeded by Benji Whelan
