= Damien Byrne (Gaelic footballer) =

Irish Gaelic footballer (born 1978)

Personal information
- Native name: Damien Ó Broin (Irish)
- Nicknames: Hairiest Man in Tipp, Mongo, Cardinal of the Craic, Killusty Lovin', Thatcher
- Born: 16 June 1976 (age 50) Fethard, County Tipperary, Ireland

Sport
- Sport: Gaelic football
- Position: Right corner-back
Club
- Years: Club
- Fethard
Club titles
- Tipperary titles: 5
Inter-county
- Years: County
- 1999–2005: Tipperary
Inter-county titles
- Munster titles: 0
- All-Irelands: 0
- NFL: 0
- All Stars: 0

Damien Byrne (born 16 June 1978) is an Irish retired Gaelic footballer who played as a right corner-back for the Tipperary senior team.

Born in Fethard, County Tipperary, Byrne first arrived on the inter-county scene at the age of sixteen when he first linked up with the Tipperary minor team before later joining the under-21 and junior sides. He joined the senior panel during the 1998 championship. Byrne later became a regular member of the starting fifteen and won one Tommy Murphy Cup medal.

At club level Byrne is a two-time championship medallist with Fethard GAA.

He retired from inter-county football following the conclusion of the 2005 championship.

== Honours ==
=== Player ===
==== Fethard ====
- Tipperary Senior Football Championship (2): 1997, 2001

==== Tipperary ====
- Tommy Murphy Cup (1): 2005
- McGrath Cup (1): 2003
- All-Ireland Junior Football Championship (1): 1998
- Munster Junior Football Championship (1): 1998

Sporting positions
Preceded by Liam Cronin	Tipperary Senior Football Captain; 2002	Succeeded by Philly Ryan
