= Jerry Shelly =

Tipperary Gaelic footballer

Personal information
- Native name: Diarmuid Ó Sealbhaigh (Irish)
- Born: 27 February 1891 Heathview, County Tipperary, Ireland
- Died: 13 August 1963 (aged 72) Carrick-on-Suir, County Tipperary, Ireland
- Occupation: Commercial traveller

Sport
- Sport: Gaelic football
- Position: Left corner-back
Club
- Years: Club
- Grangemockler
Club titles
- Tipperary titles: 0
Inter-county
- Years: County
- 1914–1924: Tipperary
Inter-county titles
- Munster titles: 2
- All-Irelands: 1

Jeremiah Shelly (27 February 1891 – 13 August 1963) was an Irish Gaelic footballer. His championship career at senior level with the Tipperary county team spanned ten years from 1914 to 1924.

Shelly made his debut on the inter-county scene at the age of twenty when he was selected for the Tipperary junior team in 1911. He enjoyed two championship seasons with the junior team, culminating with the winning of an All-Ireland medal in 1912. Shelly subsequently joined the Tipperary senior team, making his debut during the 1914 championship. The highlight of his inter-county career came in 1920 when he won an All-Ireland medal as captain of the team. Shelly also won two Munster medals.

== Honours ==
Tipperary

- All-Ireland Senior Football Championship (1): 1920 (c)
- Munster Senior Football Championship (2): 1918, 1920 (c)
- All-Ireland Junior Football Championship (1): 1912
- Munster Junior Football Championship (1): 1912

Achievements
Preceded by Larry Stanley	All-Ireland SFC winning captain 1920	Succeeded by Eddie Carroll
