= Paul Kelly (football manager) =

Paul Kelly is an Irish Gaelic football manager. He managed the Tipperary county team from November 2023, when he was given a three-year contract, before stepping down in June 2024.

== Career ==
Kelly was previously part of the Wicklow management team in 2023. He previously managed the Thomas Davis club in Dublin that reached the 2019 Dublin County football final and also managed Naas in 2021.

In June 2024, Kelly stepped down as manager of the Tipperary senior football team after one year in charge.

== Personal life ==
Kelly is originally from Tallaght, but now lives in Eadestown in Co Kildare.

Sporting positions
Preceded by David Power	Tipperary Senior Football Manager; 2023–2024	Succeeded by Philly Ryan
