= Liam Cronin =

Irish Gaelic footballer (born 1968)

Personal information
- Native name: Liam Ó Cróinín (Irish)
- Nickname: Cully
- Born: 1968 (age 57–58) Clonmel, County Tipperary, Ireland

Sport
- Sport: Gaelic football
Club
- Years: Club
- Moyle Rovers
Club titles
- Tipperary titles: 5
Inter-county
- Years: County
- 1994-2004: Tipperary
Inter-county titles
- Munster titles: 0
- All-Irelands: 0
- NFL: 0
- All Stars: 0

Liam Cronin (born 1968) is an Irish retired Gaelic footballer who played for the Tipperary senior team.

Born in Clonmel, County Tipperary, Cronin first arrived on the inter-county scene at the age of seventeen when he first linked up with the Tipperary minor team before later joining the junior side. He joined the senior panel during the 1992 championship. Cronin subsequently became a regular member of the starting fifteen.

At club level, Cronin is a five-time championship medallist with Moyle Rovers.

Cronin retired from inter-county football following the conclusion of the 2004 championship.

In retirement from playing, Cromin became involved in team management and coaching. He served as coach of the Tipperary minor team on one occasion.

== Honours ==
=== Player ===
Moyle Rovers

- Tipperary Senior Football Championship (5): 1995, 1996, 1998, 1999, 2000

Sporting positions
Preceded by	Tipperary Senior Football Captain; 1997	Succeeded by
Preceded by Declan Browne	Tipperary Senior Football Captain; 2000-2001	Succeeded by Damien Byrne
