= Jimmy McNamara =

Irish football player

Personal information
- Native name: Séamus Mac Conmara (Irish)
- Born: 5 April 1893 Cahir, County Tipperary, Ireland
- Died: 21 August 1929 (aged 36) Cahir, County Tipperary, Ireland
- Occupation: Shopkeeper

Sport
- Sport: Gaelic football
Club
- Years: Club
- Cahir
Club titles
- Tipperary titles: 0
Inter-county
- Years: County
- 1918–1926: Tipperary
Inter-county titles
- Munster titles: 2
- All-Irelands: 1

James McNamara (5 April 1893 – 21 August 1929) was an Irish association footballer and Gaelic footballer. His championship career at senior level with the Tipperary county team spanned eight years from 1918 to 1926.

McNamara made his debut on the inter-county scene at the age of twenty-five when he was selected for the Tipperary senior team, making his debut during the 1918 championship. The highlight of McNamara's inter-county career came in 1920 when he won an All-Ireland medal. He also won two Munster medals.

== Honours ==
Tipperary

- All-Ireland Senior Football Championship (1): 1920
- Munster Senior Football Championship (2): 1918, 1920
