= Damian O'Brien =

Irish Gaelic footballer

Personal information
- Native name: Damian Ó Briain (Irish)
- Born: 1980 (age 45–46) Donohill, County Tipperary, Ireland
- Occupation: Secondary school teacher

Sport
- Sport: Gaelic football
- Position: Left corner-forward
Club
- Years: Club
- Éire Óg Annacarty
Club titles
- Tipperary titles: 0
Inter-county
- Years: County
- 2000-2010: Tipperary
Inter-county titles
- Munster titles: 0
- All-Irelands: 0
- NFL: 0
- All Stars: 0

Damian O'Brien (born 1980) is an Irish Gaelic footballer who played as a left corner-forward for the Tipperary senior team.

Born in Donohill, County Tipperary, O'Brien first arrived on the inter-county scene at the age of seventeen when he first linked up with the Tipperary minor team before later joining the under-21 and junior sides. He joined the senior panel during the 2000 championship. O'Brien later became a regular member of the starting fifteen and has won one Tommy Murphy Cup medal.

At club level O'Brian plays with Éire Óg Annacarty.

O'Brien retired from inter-county football following the conclusion of the 2010 championship.
