= Robbie Costigan =

Irish Gaelic footballer (born 1982)

Personal information
- Native name: Roibeárd Ó Costagáin (Irish)
- Born: 1982 (age 43–44) Cahir, County Tipperary, Ireland

Sport
- Sport: Gaelic football
- Position: Left wing-back
Club
- Years: Club
- Clerihan
Club titles
- Tipperary titles: 1
Inter-county
- Years: County
- 2002-2013: Tipperary
Inter-county titles
- Munster titles: 0
- All-Irelands: 0
- NFL: 0
- All Stars: 0

Robert "Robbie" Costigan (born 1982) is an Irish Gaelic footballer who played as a left wing-back for the Tipperary senior team.

Born in Cahir, County Tipperary, Costigan first arrived on the inter-county scene at the age of twenty when he first linked up with the Tipperary under-21 team. He joined the senior panel during the 2002 championship. Costigan became a regular member of the starting fifteen of both teams and won one Tommy Murphy Cup medal.

As a member of the Munster inter-provincial team on a number of occasions Costigan won one Railway Cup medal. At club level he is a one-time championship medallist with Cahir.

Costigan retired from inter-county football following the conclusion of the 2013 championship.

== Honours ==
=== Player ===
Cahir

- Tipperary Senior Football Championship (1): 2003

Tipperary

- Tommy Murphy Cup (1): 2005

Munster

- Railway Cup (1): 2008

Sporting positions
Preceded by Philly Ryan	Tipperary Senior Football Captain; 2004	Succeeded by Declan Browne
Preceded by Barry Grogan	Tipperary Senior Football Captain; 2010	Succeeded by Barry Grogan
