= 2005 Tommy Murphy Cup =

- Dates: 16 July 2005 – 4 September 2005
- Teams: 12
- Sponsor: Bank of Ireland
- Champions: Tipperary (1st title); Declan Browne (captain); Séamus McCarthy (manager)
- Runners-up: Wexford; John Hudson (captain); Michael Furlong (manager)

Tournament statistics
- Matches played: 9
- Goals scored: 19 (2.11 per match)
- Points scored: 211 (23.44 per match)
- Top scorer(s): Mattie Forde (2-14)

The 2005 Tommy Murphy Cup was the 2nd staging of the Tommy Murphy Cup, the Gaelic Athletic Association's secondary inter-county Gaelic football tournament. The draw for the preliminary round fixtures took place on 9 July 2005. The championship began on 16 July 2005 and ended on 4 September 2005.

Clare were the defending champions but they did not enter the championship.

On 4 September 2005, Tipperary won the championship following a 3-10 to 0-15 defeat of Wexford in the final. This was their first Tommy Murphy Cup title.

Wexford's Mattie Forde was the championship's top scorer with 2-14.

== Teams ==
=== Summaries ===
Team	Colours	Sponsor	Manager	Most recent success		
Team	Colours	Sponsor	Manager	All-Ireland	Provincial	League
Antrim	Saffron and white	Bushmills Distillery	Michael Culbert		1951	
Carlow	Green, red and yellow	Stone Developments	Liam Hayes			
Fermanagh	Green and white	Tracey Concrete	Charlie Mulgrew			
Kilkenny	Black and amber	Avonmore			1911	
Leitrim	Green and yellow	Masonite	Dessie Dolan		1994	
London	Blue and green	JCB	Noel Dunning			
Longford	Blue and gold	Longford Arms Hotel	Luke Dempsey		1968	1965-66
Roscommon	Yellow and blue	Ballymore Properties	Val Daly	1944	2001	
Tipperary	Blue and gold	Enfer	Séamus McCarthy	1920	1935	
Waterford	White and blue	Lawlors Hotel	John Kiely		1898	
Wexford	Purple and gold	Wexford Creamery	Michael Furlong	1918	1945	
Wicklow	Blue and gold	White Young Green	Hugh Kenny			

=== Withdrawals ===
In July Carlow manager Liam Hayes was forced to pull his side out of the championship due to the unavailability of the majority of his first-choice squad. Hayes made the decision as 12 of his panel were injured and four dual players decided to line out for the Carlow hurlers.

In August the Antrim County Board took the decision to withdraw from the championship due to a full club hurling fixture list, injuries and players on holidays.

== Preliminary round ==
Matches

16 July 2005 Preliminary round	Longford	1-13 - 0-10	Wicklow	Leo Casey Park
	P Barden 1-3, B Kavanagh 0-4, K Mulligan 0-3, J Martin 0-3.		J Daniels 0-4, JP Davis 0-2, T Harney 0-2, L Glynn 0-1, W O’Gorman 0-1.	Referee: S Doyle (Wexford)

16 July 2005 Preliminary round	London	1-15 - 0-9	Kilkenny	Páirc Tailteann
	S McInerney 1-1, JP Boyle 0-4, B Solan 0-3, F Cunningham 0-2, E Brennan 0-2, P McConigley 0-1, P Morgan 0-1, D O’Connor 0-1.		A Holden 0-3, D Herity 0-2, P Maher 0-2, P Donnelly 0-1, P Sheehan 0-1.	Referee: M Sludden (Tyrone)

16 July 2005 Preliminary round	Tipperary	2-9 - 1-11	Leitrim	Semple Stadium
	D O'Brien 1-2; B Mulvihill 1-1; B Hickey 0-3; N Fitzgerald 0-2; C Maher 0-1.	Report	M Foley, B Prior 0-4 each; D Duignan 1-0; S Foley, D Brennan and D Maxwell 0-1 each.	Referee: E Whelan (Laois)

16 July 2005 Preliminary round	Fermanagh	w/o - scr.	Carlow

== Quarter-finals ==
Matches

30 July 2005 Quarter-final	Wexford	2-8 - 1-7	Fermanagh	Wexford Park
	M Forde 1-2, 2 frees; J Hegarty 1-1; J D'Arcy 0-2, 1 free; S Cullen, J Hudson, R Barry 0-1 each.	Report	C O’Reilly 0-5, F Reilly 1-0, D Kelly 0-2.	Referee: G Kinneavey (Galway)

30 July 2005 Quarter-final	Longford	2-15 - 0-7	Waterford	Leo Casey Park
	P Barden 1-3 (0-2f), J Martin 0-4, K Mulligan 0-3, S Mulligan 1-0, K Smith 0-2, B Kavanagh, D Glennon and D Brady (0-1, each).	Report	N Curran 0-5, G Power 0-1, L O Lionnain 0-1.	Referee: E Whelan (Laois)

7 August 2005 Quarter-final	Roscommon	1-15 - 0-9	London	Dr. Hyde Park
	G Heneghan 0-7, S Lohan 0-6, J Rogers, S O'Neill, J Callery, J Collins 0-1 each.	Report	B Solan 0-3, E Brennan, F Heir, J Rafter, K Waldron, C Donnellan 0-1 each).

14 August 2005 Quarter-final	Tipperary	w/o - scr.	Antrim

== Semi-finals ==
Matches

20 August 2005 Semi-final	Wexford	3-19 - 2-13	Longford	Wexford Park
	M Forde 1-6, J Hudson 1-4, P Colfer 1-2, D Foran 0-3, P Curtis 0-2, R Barry 0-1, PJ Banville 0-1.		B Kavanagh 0-5, J Martin 0-5, L Keenan 1-1, W Murray 1-0, P Barden 0-1, K Mulligan 0-1.	Referee: M Ryan (Limerick)

22 August 2005 Semi-final	Tipperary	0-15 - 0-11	Roscommon	Semple Stadium
	D Browne (0-7), B Hickey (0-5), B Mulvihill (0-1), A Fitzgerald (0-1), B Lacey (0-1).	Report	S Lohan (0-7), K Mannion (0-2), D Hoey (0-1), B Higgins (0-1).

== Final ==
4 September 2005 Final	Tipperary	3-10 - 0-15	Wexford	Croke Park
	D Browne (1-7), D O'Brien (1-2), A Fitzgerald (1-0), B Hickey (0-1).	Report	M Forde (0-6, including 0-4 frees), D Kinsella (0-3), PJ Banville (0-1), J Hegarty (0-1), C Morris (0-1), D Breen (0-1), D Murphy (0-1), S Cullen (0-1).	Referee: J White (Donegal)

== Statistics ==
=== Top scorers ===
==== Overall ====
Rank	Player	County	Tally	Total	Matches	Average
1	Mattie Forde	Wexford	2-14	20	3	6.66
2	Declan Browne	Tipperary	1-14	17	3	5.66
3	Paul Barden	Longford	2-7	13	3	4.33
3	Stephen Lohan	Roscommon	0-13	13	2	6.50
5	Damian O'Brien	Tipperary	2-4	10	3	3.33
5	Brian Kavanagh	Longford	0-10	10	3	3.33

==== Single game ====
Rank	Player	County	Tally	Total	Opposition
1	Declan Browne	Tipperary	1-7	10	Wexford
2	Mattie Forde	Wexford	1-6	9	Longford
3	John Hudson	Wexford	1-4	7	Longford
3	Declan Browne	Tipperary	0-7	7	Roscommon
3	Stephen Lohan	Roscommon	0-7	7	Tipperary
3	Ger Heneghan	Roscommon	0-7	7	London
7	Paul Barden	Longford	1-3	6	Wicklow
7	Stephen Lohan	Roscommon	0-6	6	London
7	Paul Barden	Longford	1-3	6	Waterford
10	Damian O'Brien	Tipperary	1-2	5	Leitrim
10	Mattie Forde	Wexford	1-2	5	Fermanagh
10	Paddy Colfer	Wexford	1-2	5	Longford
10	Damian O'Brien	Tipperary	1-2	5	Wexford
10	Niall Curran	Waterford	0-5	5	Longford
10	Ciaran O'Reilly	Fermanagh	0-5	5	Wexford
10	Brian Kavanagh	Longford	0-5	5	Wexford
10	Jamesie Martin	Longford	0-5	5	Wexford
10	Benny Hickey	Tipperary	0-5	5	Roscommon

== Miscellaneous ==
- Tipperary win their first championship in 10 years, last winning the 1995 All-Ireland Senior B Football Championship

== See also ==
- 2005 All-Ireland Senior Football Championship
