= Séamus McCarthy =

Tipperary Gaelic footballer (born 1954)

Personal information
- Native name: Séamus Mac Cárthaigh (Irish)
- Born: 1954 (age 71–72) Bansha, County Tipperary, Ireland

Sport
- Sport: Gaelic football
Club
- Years: Club
- Galtee Rovers
Club titles
- Tipperary titles: 3
Inter-county
- Years: County
- 1974–1982: Tipperary
Inter-county titles
- Munster titles: 0
- All-Irelands: 0
- NFL: 0
- All Stars: 0

Séamus McCarthy (born 1954) is an Irish former Gaelic footballer who played at senior level for the Tipperary county team.

Born in Bansha, County Tipperary, McCarthy first arrived on the inter-county scene at the age of seventeen when he first linked up with the Tipperary minor team in 1972 before later joining the under-21 side in 1974 and 1975. He joined the senior panel during the 1974 championship. McCarthy subsequently became a regular member of the starting fifteen.

At club level McCarthy is a three-time championship medallist with Galtee Rovers.

McCarthy retired from inter-county football following the conclusion of the 1982 championship.

In retirement from playing McCarthy became involved in team management and coaching. He has served as manager and selector with the Tipperary minor, under-21, junior and senior teams.

He was also an umpire, who aged 21 during the 1975 All-Ireland Senior Football Championship Final, became part of the first father-and-son pair (with his 50-year-old father Eddie) to umpire at an All-Ireland final.

== Honours ==
=== Player ===
Galtee Rovers

- Tipperary Senior Football Championship (3): 1976, 1980, 1981
- Tipperary Under 21 Championship (1): 1975

=== Manager ===
Tipperary

- Tipperary- Munster Minor Football Champions : 1984
- Tipperary- All Ireland 'B' Senior Football Champions: 1995
- Tipperary- Munster and All Ireland Junior Football Champions: 1998
- Tipperary- Tommy Murphy Cup Senior Football Champions: 2005

Munster

- Munster- Railway Cup Champions: 1999

Ireland

- Ireland- International Rules Selector: 2013, 2014

Sporting positions
Preceded by	Tipperary Under-21 Football Manager; 1985–1988	Succeeded by Colm O'Flaherty
Preceded by Mickey Niblock	Tipperary Senior Football Manager; 1991–1996	Succeeded by Paddy Morrissey
Preceded by Don Ryan	Tipperary Under-21 Football Manager; 1997–1999	Succeeded by Walter Moloney
Preceded by Paddy Morrissey	Tipperary Junior Football Manager; 1997–2003	Succeeded by Liam Molloy
Preceded by Peter Creedon	Tipperary Under-21 Football Manager; 2005–2006	Succeeded by John Cummins
Preceded by Andy Shortall	Tipperary Senior Football Manager; 2004–2006	Succeeded by John Owens
Achievements
Preceded by John Kennedy (Clare)	Tommy Murphy Cup Final winning manager 2005	Succeeded by Eamon McEnenaey (Louth)
