= JK Brackens GAA Club =

Gaelic games club in County Tipperary, Ireland

JK Brackens GAA Club, Templemore
- SC Breacháin
- Founded: 1992
- County: Tipperary
- Colours: Black and White
- Grounds: Páirc Shíleáin
- Coordinates: 52°47′56.50″N 7°50′08.68″W

Playing kits
Standard colours

Senior Club Championships
	All Ireland	Munster champions	Tipperary champions
Football:	-	-	2

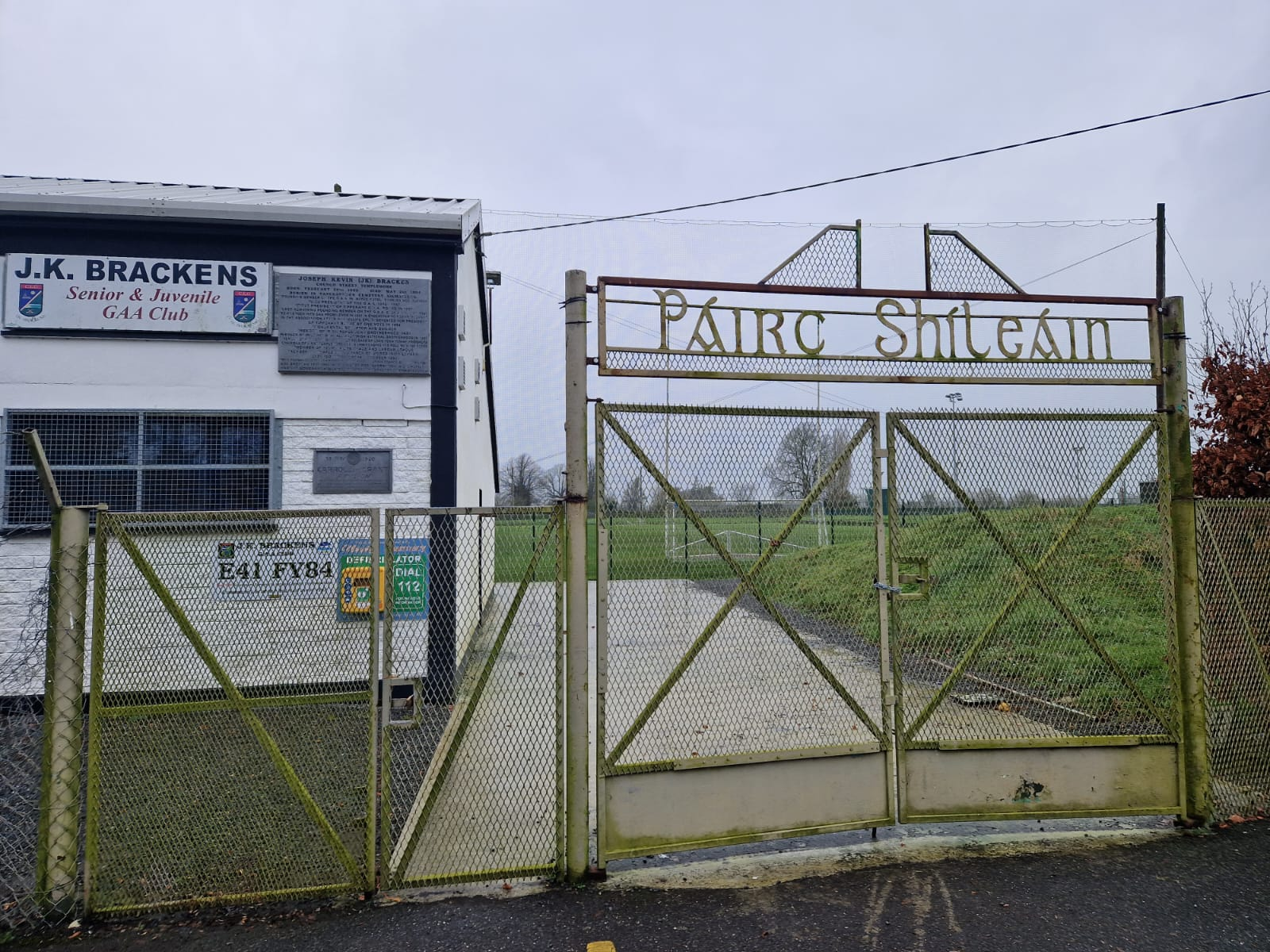
Páirc Shíleáin in Templemore

JK Brackens is a Gaelic Athletic Association club serving the parish of Templemore, Clonmore and Killea in County Tipperary, Ireland.

JK Brackens compete in the county Tipperary GAA and Mid-Tipperary divisional competitions and is one of only two clubs in Tipperary that consistently complete at senior level in both the Hurling and Gaelic football. The club is also nationally renowned as one of the country's leading GAA Scór clubs. In 2025, the club's official website recognises the club fields 21 teams from under 6 up to senior grades and has approximately 250 playing members.

The club is named after Joseph Kevin Bracken, "the radical stonemason from Templemore", who was one of the seven founding members of the Gaelic Athletic Association in 1884. Furthermore, Bracken was the first Chairman of the Tipperary County Board, he served as vice-president of the GAA, and of the original seven signatories, he was the longest serving member on the GAA national executive. He was an elected representative and chairman of Templemore Urban District Council, and was a member of the oath-bound republican organisation the IRB (Irish Republican Brotherhood).

He is the son of Patrick Bracken (1830–1897) and Anne Bracken (née Hennessy; 1828–1893) of Templemore, Co. Tipperary. Father Patrick played a pre-GAA form of Irish football as early as 1847 for the Templemore citizen's team playing against the Templemore Garrison barrack team, alongside John Kidd Guest (1831-1871), ex Templemore man, and a person linked to the embryonic formation of the North Melbourne Football Club.

JK Brackens GAA club is one of only three GAA clubs to be named after both a founding member of the GAA, and a local parishioner.

== History ==
=== Early Parish GAA – 1884-1980 ===
The Gaelic Athletic Association was founded in Thurles on 1 November 1884 less than 14 kilometres from Templemore Town with prominent local resident Joseph Kevin Bracken one of the seven founding signatories. Bracken was a well known Parnellite, IRB affiliate and 'champion athlete' according to reports. These factors were possible reasons for Joseph Kevin Bracken's invitation as a 'representative Irishman'.

Brackens prominence within the fledgling organisation influenced early formation of local GAA clubs, Templemore in 1886 with Killea, College Hill and Clonmore clubs formed soon after. The first recorded silverware claimed by a local selection was in Dublin on 14 June 1886, where the Templemore footballers played Faugh-a-Ballaghs with the Tipperary men claiming the cup and 21 Celtic Crosses. In 1887 Templemore represented Tipperary in the first All Ireland Football Championship defeating Commercials of Limerick in the first round on a score line of 9 points to 3. However an objection was raised to this result and a rematch was ordered. A depleted Templemore team lost the re-fixture on a score line of 1-9 to 4 and the Limerick side went on to win the inaugural All Ireland Football championship.

Divisional honours were first achieved in 1909 when the Templemore Grattan Football Club won a North title, followed by Templemore Éire Óg claiming 12 Mid Football crowns from 1913 to 1964. During this period Éire Óg added 2 County Football Championships in 1925 (defeating Fethard 1-04 to 1-01), and in 1936 (defeating Arravale Rovers 2-05 to 1-06). Hurling was also to the fore during this period with Killea winning Mid Junior and Intermediate titles in '27 and '31 respectively, and a Senior Mid crown in '28 - a Castleiney amalgamation), and Clonmore claiming Mid Junior Hurling honours in 1931. Other Junior Hurling crowns of honourable mention were Collegehill victory in 1954 and Templemore Kickhams title in 1961.

In the early 1960s, Templemore joined forces with Drom at Minor level as Na Fianna winning 3 divisional hurling titles in '61, '62, '63 plus Mid football in '62, however the most significant year at underage (prior to the formation of the Brackens club) was in 1973 with Templemore Éire Óg claiming a first Minor A Football County Championship.

=== Pre-Formation Era – 1980-1992 ===
The introduction of the "one club one parish" rule in 1961 saw rural GAA clubs amalgamate to single parish clubs, however up until 1992 the Templemore parish maintained a disjointed approach to club GAA with the Éire Óg Club represented the area in football, Clonmore in intermediate hurling and the Killea club for junior hurling. Nonetheless as the GAA Centenary approached, local consensus grew for a more unified one parish club and throughout the decade prior to the club's formation, combined parish teams were entered in various competitions, which in 1980 Clonmore and Killea amalgamated as Clonmore / Killea and enter hurling teams competing at junior, intermediate and senior levels. This arrangement continued until the GAA centenary year of '84 when Clonmore and Killea agreed to enter Junior and Intermediate competitions as single clubs but competed as one club at senior level, and it was under the name of JK Brackens that this group played as. The following year JK Brackens competed at Minor and Under 21 hurling only, however in ’86 and ‘87 the Brackens represented the parish at senior grade once more. A senior JK Brackens selection did not feature in 1988 as Clonmore had won promotion to senior ranks by virtue of winning the County Intermediate Hurling Championship of 1987. Instead ‘The Brackens’ were represented at minor and under 21 grades only, and it was at these grades that JK Brackens claimed their first silverware, winning Mid Minor B and Mid Under 21 B hurling titles in 1989 and 1990 respectively.

The period from ‘79 to ‘91 was up to that point the most successful period for hurling in the parish, with Killea winning Junior A Mid titles in ‘89 and ‘91, (their first silverware since 1928), Clonmore winning Intermediate Mid title in ’79, ’84, ’86 and Mid and County honours in 1987. Add to this Minor and Under 21 B titles in ‘89 and ‘91 for the JK Brackens selection, the case for a single GAA club for the parish grew strong impedes with the common consensus amongst players and local club officials was that to compete and develop Gaelic Games locally, that a ‘one parish, one club’ approach should be adopted. Retrospectively considered, the club recognises publicly today that Gaelic football in the parish benefited from the inclusion of Templemore Éire Óg in a Clonmore Killea partnership.

=== Foundation to Present Day ===
In 1991, the three GAA clubs of the parish approached the county board seeking assistance to oversee the amalgamation process. Following a lengthy exercise in which county board appointees visited the parish on over a dozen occasions, the three clubs democratically voted their clubs out of existence for a 5-year period, and backed the formation of a single club. One of the most influencing factors in this decision was the voice of the playing members of the clubs, who voted by 56 to 3 in favour of an amalgamation.

In February 1992, at a special convention in Páirc Shíleáin, the attendance of close to 150 members of the three clubs, gave their overwhelming support to the new venture, and the JK Brackens GAA club was officially formed merging the former GAA clubs of Templemore Éire Óg, Clonmore GAA and Killea GAA, and thereafter was ratified by Mid and County Boards, and by Croke Park for a five-year period. In 1997 some members of the Killea GAA club decided to leave the partnership and reform into their old entity however many player from that catchment area decided to continue to play under the Brackens flag.

The newly formed Club was an immediate success with the Intermediate footballer and hurlers both winning Mid championships in ‘92 and there were numerous titles at Minor, U16, U14 and U12 levels. The footballers repeated their achievement in ’93 and also added county honours, thus winning promotion to senior ranks where they have remained since. The Mid Intermediate Hurling championship was ultra-competitive at this time and included teams such as Drom-Inch GAA and Upperchurch-Drombane GAA. JK Brackens had to wait until ’96 and ’97 for further Intermediate titles to add to the trophy cabinet. ‘Brackens lost two successive county finals in both of these years however they won promotion to senior level by virtue of winning two divisional crowns in a row, and have subsequently competed at senior grade since.

1997 was also the year that the 'Brackens won their first county hurling title winning the Under 21 B championship in a side captained by Eamonn Corcoran. Further B hurling county titles were claimed in 2002 and 2004 at U21 and Minor levels respectively. The club had to wait until 2002 for their first title at senior level, winning the Mid Senior Football Championship, the first parish side to claim the trophy in 38 years. They have subsequently won the title 6 times since the turn of the millennium thus breaking the dominance of Loughmore-Castleiney GAA. Brackens won their title in senior hurling silverware winning the Cahill Cup in ’07 and ’08, and they won their first county titles at senior level in 2005 and 2006, winning the Tipperary Division 1 Football League, the former year a first senior county title for the parish in 69 years.

In 2016, JK Brackens GAA and Killea GAA agreed to join forces at minor and under 21 levels under the name JK Brackens Óg. In effect, this arrangement extended the agreed structures of the juvenile club up to 21 years of age, and therefore the teams had the full pick of the parish while players were free able to represent their own half at the parish at adult hurling. This agreement also facilitated players from Killea to play football with Brackens at Junior and Senior grades, as their club had no affiliated Gaelic football teams. The foresight of both clubs proved an instant success when the Brackens Óg line-up completed a historic double, winning the Mid Minor A football crown and the parishes first Minor A hurling title in a squad that had 3 members of the All-Ireland winning minor team of that year.

JKB Óg created further history in 2018 capturing the Minor and Under 21 A county titles becoming only the 6th Tipperary club to complete this remarkable double, and also bridged a parish gap of 45 years since a last A county title.

== Honours ==
- Mid Tipperary Senior Hurling Championship: (2)
  - JK Brackens: 2022 2025
- Tipperary Senior Hurling Championship Roinn II - Séamus Ó Riain Cup: (1)
  - 2019
- Tipperary Senior Football champions: (3)
  - Templemore Éire Óg: 1887, 1925, 1936
- Mid Tipperary Senior Football Championship: (19)
  - Templemore Éire Óg: 1913, 1916, 1924, 1927, 1928, 1935, 1936, 1938, 1939, 1942, 1963, 1964
  - JK Brackens: 2002, 2006, 2011, 2013, 2014, 2019, 2022
- North Tipperary Senior Football Championship: (1)
  - Templemore: 1909
- County Tipperary Intermediate Hurling Championship: (1)
  - Clonmore: 1987
- Mid Tipperary Intermediate Hurling Championship: (7)
  - Clonmore: 1979, 1984, 1986, 1987
  - JK Brackens: 1992, 1996, 1997
- Tipperary Intermediate Football Championship: (1)
  - 1993
- Mid Tipperary Intermediate Football Championship: (5)
  - Templemore Éire Óg: 1982
  - JK Brackens: 1992, 1993, 2002, 2023
- Mid Tipperary Junior A Hurling Championship: (10)
  - Clonmore: 1932, 1970, 1974, 1975, 1978
  - Collegehill: 1954
  - Templemore Kickhams: 1961
  - JK Brackens: 1997, 1998, 2023
- Tipperary Junior A Football Championship: (3)
  - Templemore Éire Óg: 1957, 1972
  - JK Brackens: 2018
- Mid Tipperary Junior A Football Championship: (13)
  - Templemore Éire Óg: 1916, 1929, 1930, 1931, 1932, 1933, 1957, 1960, 1972
  - JK Brackens: 1997, 1999, 2000, 2018
- Mid Tipperary Junior B Hurling Championship: (2)
  - 1999, 2021
- Tipperary Junior B Football Championship: (1)
  - 2003
- Mid Tipperary Junior B Football Championship: (2)
  - 2003, 2007
- Tipperary Under-21 B Hurling Championship: (2)
  - 1997, 2002
- Mid Tipperary Under-21 B Hurling Championship: (6)
  - Templemore Brackens: 1990
  - JK Brackens: 1993, 1997, 2002, 2009, 2014
- Tipperary Under-21 A Football Championship: (2)
  - 2018, 2019
- Mid Tipperary Under-21 A Football Championship: (14)
  - Templemore Éire Óg: 1971, 1983, 1986, 1987, 1988, 1989
  - JK Brackens: 1998, 2008, 2014, 2017, 2018, 2019, 2023, 2024
- Mid Tipperary Under-19 A Football Championship: (3)
  - 2021, 2023, 2024
- Mid Tipperary Minor A Hurling Championship: (4)
  - Na Fianna: 1961, 1962, 1963
  - JK Brackens: 2016
- Tipperary Minor B Hurling Championship: (1)
  - 2004
- Mid Tipperary Minor B Hurling Championship: (3)
  - Templemore Brackens: 1990
  - JK Brackens: 2004, 2012
- Tipperary Minor A Football Championship: (3)
  - Templemore Éire Óg: 1973
  - JK Brackens: 2018
- Mid Tipperary Minor A Football Championship: (28)
  - Templemore Éire Óg: 1950, 1951, 1952, 1958, 1967, 1968, 1969, 1970, 1971, 1973, 1981, 1982, 1984, 1985, 1986, 1987
  - Na Fianna: 1962
  - JK Brackens: 1992, 1994, 1998, 1999, 2000, 2007, 2012, 2014, 2016, 2017, 2018

== Notable players ==
This lists outlines current or former JK Brackens players that have represented and won provincial or national honours with Tipperary.

Player	Tipperary Teams Represented	Honours Won	Notes
Brendan Bane	Minor Football 1986 U21 Hurling 1989, 1990 Junior Hurling 1988, 1991, 1992	Munster U21 Hurling 1989, 1990 All-Ireland U21 Hurling 1989 Munster Junior Hurling 1988, 1991 All-Ireland Junior Hurling 1991	
John Bane	Minor Football 1995	Munster Minor Football 1995	
Martin Bohan	Minor Football 1968 Masters Hurling 1994, 1996	Munster Masters Hurling 1994, 1996 All-Ireland Masters Hurling 1994, 1996	
David Bourke	U21 Football 1998 Junior Football 1998 Intermediate Hurling 1998	Munster Junior Football 1998 All-Ireland Junior Football 1998	Bourke has also won an All-Ireland Championship with the London Hurlers in the 2005 Nicky Rackard Cup, alongside former Bracken's player Paul Doyle Bourke also has won a Fitgibbon Cup medal with WIT in 2000
Martin Bourke	Junior Hurling 1984, 1985, 1987, 1988, 1992 Masters Hurling 1999, 2000, 2001, 2002, 2003	Munster Junior Hurling 1985, 1988 Munster Masters Hurling 2000, 2001, 2003 All-Ireland Masters Hurling 2000, 2001, 2003	Bourke became the first player from the parish to captain a Tipperary side to honours in the 1988 Munster Junior Hurling Final Bourke was captain when Templemore CBS won its first Harty Cup and Dr. Croke Cup (All Ireland Schools A hurling) in 1978
Seamus Bourke	Minor Hurling 1975 U21 Hurling 1977, 1978 Senior Hurling 1978, 1979, 1980, 1981, 1982, 1983 Junior Hurling 1985, 1987, 1988 Masters Hurling 1997, 1998, 1999, 2000, 2001, 2002	Munster U21 Hurling 1978 Munster Junior Hurling 1985, 1988 Munster Masters Hurling 2000, 2001 All-Ireland Masters Hurling 2000, 2001	Bourke was part of the UCD Fitzgibbon Cup winning teams of 1978 and 1979
Shane Bourke	Minor Hurling 2006 U21 Hurling 2008, 2009 Senior Hurling 2011, 2012, 2013, 2014, 2015	All-Ireland Minor Hurling 2006 Munster U21 Hurling 2008 Munster Senior Hurling 2011, 2012, 2015	Bourke was part of the UCC Fitzgibbon Cup winning teams of 2009 and 2012, captaining the 2012 team
Paddy Cadell	Minor Hurling 2016, 2017 U21 Hurling 2018 U20 Hurling 2019 Senior Hurling 2019, 2020, 2021, 2022, 2023, 2024	Munster Minor Hurling 2016 All-Ireland Minor Hurling 2016 All-Ireland U21 Hurling 2018 Munster U20 Hurling 2019 All-Ireland U20 Hurling 2019 All-Ireland Senior Hurling 2019	Cadell captained the victorious Our Lady's Templemore Harty and Croke Cup teams (All-Ireland A Schools) of 2017 Cadell was selected captain of the 2017 Tipperary minor hurling panel Cadell was part of the UCC Fitzgibbon Cup winning teams of 2019 and 2020 Cadell is one of only three GAA players to hold All-Ireland hurling medals at Minor, U20, U21 and Senior levels, and has a distinct record of All-Ireland medals at 6 different grades
Jim Cahill	Minor Hurling 1985, 1986 Minor Football 1986 U21 Hurling 1989 U21 Football 1987, 1988, 1989 Junior Hurling 1992, 1993	Munster U21 Hurling 1989 All-Ireland U21 Hurling 1989	
Sean Collum	Minor Hurling 1989, 1990 Minor Football 1989, 1990 U21 Hurling 1992, 1993 U21 Football 1992, 1993 Junior Hurling 1995, 1996 Intermediate Hurling 1997 Senior Football 1992, 1993, 1994, 1995, 1996, 1997, 1998, 1999, 2001, 2002, 2003, 2004, 2005	Senior Football Tommy Murphy Cup 2005 All-Ireland Senior B Football 1995	Collum captained the 1993 Tipperary Senior football team to their first appearance in a Munster final in 49 years Collum coached the victories UCD Fitzgibbon Cup team of 2001
Éamonn Corcoran	Minor Hurling 1995 U21 Hurling 1997, 1998 Intermediate Hurling 1997, 1998 Senior Hurling 1999, 2000, 2001, 2002, 2003, 2004, 2005, 2006, 2007, 2008	Munster Senior Hurling 2001, 2008 All-Ireland Senior Hurling 2001 National Hurling League 1999, 2001, 2008	Corcoran was the club's first senior All-Ireland winner since its foundation He is the club's first All Star, he was selected at right wing back on the 2001 team Corcoran has won 2 Fitzgibbon Cups with WIT in 1999 and 2000, and was awarded the Player of the Tournament for both years
Pa Delaney	Junior Hurling 1988	Munster Junior Hurling 1988	
Ian Delaney	Minor Hurling 2003, 2004 U21 Hurling 2006, 2007	Munster Minor Hurling 2003 U21 Munster Hurling 2006	Delaney was a member of the Roscommon senior hurling team that won the 2015 Nicky Rackard Cup
Aidan Doyle	Minor Hurling 1996 Minor Football 1996 U21 Hurling 1998 Intermediate Hurling 1998	Munster Minor Hurling 1996 All-Ireland Minor Hurling 1996	Doyle was man of the match in the drawn All-Ireland final scoring 4 points from play
Lyndon Fairbrother	Minor Hurling 2015, 2016 U21 Hurling 2017, 2018	Munster Minor Hurling 2015, 2016 All-Ireland Minor Hurling 2016 All-Ireland U21 Hurling 2018	Fairbrother was awarded the 2015 Young Hurler of the Year by the Munster Council Fairbrother was a member of the victorious Our Lady's Templemore Harty and Croke Cup teams (All-Ireland A Schools) of 2017
Tomas Hamill***	Minor Hurling 2011, 2012 U21 Hurling 2013, 2014, 2015 Senior Hurling 2013, 2014, 2016, 2017	Munster Minor Hurling 2012 All-Ireland Minor Hurling 2012 Munster Senior Hurling 2015, 2016 All-Ireland Senior Hurling 2016	Hamill represented JK Brackens at juvenile level only. At senior club level he represented Killea from 2011 to 2013, transferring to Moyne Templetouhy in 2014 Hamill also has won a Fitzgibbon Cup with WIT in 2014
Declan Lynagh	Minor Football 2007 U21 Football 2010	Munster U21 Football 2010	
Dean McEnroe	Minor Football 2012 U21 Football 2014, 2015 Junior Football 2014, 2015 Senior Football 2019, 2020	Munster Minor Football 2012 Munster U21 Football 2015 Munster Senior Football 2020	
Kevin Mulryan	Minor Hurling 1998, 1999 Minor Football 1998, 1999 U21 Hurling 2001, 2002 U21 Football 2000, 2001, 2002 Junior Football 2000 Senior Football 2001, 2002, 2003, 2004, 2005, 2006, 2007, 2008, 2009, 2010	Munster Minor Hurling 1999 Senior Football Tommy Murphy Cup 2005 National Football League Division 3 2009	Mulryan was a selector over the victorious Tipperary Minor Football panel which won Munster honours in 2012
Tom Murphy	Minor Hurling 2015, 2016	Munster Minor Hurling 2015, 2016 All-Ireland Minor Hurling 2016	
Alan O'Riordan	Minor Football 2011 Junior Football 2015	Munster Minor Football 2011 All-Ireland Minor Football 2011	
Colin O'Riordan	Minor Hurling 2012, 2013 Minor Football 2011, 2012, 2013 U21 Hurling 2013, 2014, 2015 U21 Football 2014, 2015 Senior Hurling 2014 Senior Football 2014, 2015, 2020	Munster Minor Football 2011, 2012 All-Ireland Minor Football 2011 All-Ireland Minor Hurling 2012 Munster U21 Football 2015 National Football League Division 4 2014 Munster Senior Football 2020	O'Riordan became the second clubman to captain a victorious Tipperary side when he led the U21 footballers to the 2015 Munster Championship He was only 15 when he won an All-Ireland Minor Football title O'Riordan has been nominated on the GAA All-Star Football team in 2014 and 2020 He was vote GAA U21 Player of the Year in 2015 In 2015, O'Riordan was signed by the Australian Rules Football team Sydney Swans.
Kevin O'Riordan	Minor Football 2007, 2008 U21 Football 2010, 2011	Munster U21 Football 2010	
Andrew Ormond	Minor Hurling 2017 U20 Hurling 2019, 2020 Senior Hurling 2021, 2023, 2024, 2025, 2026	Munster U20 Hurling 2019 All-Ireland U20 Hurling 2019 All-Ireland Senior Hurling 2025	Ormond was a member of the victorious Our Lady's Templemore Harty and Croke Cup teams (All-Ireland A Schools) of 2017 Ormond started in the half-forward line for Tipperary's All-Ireland Senior hurling championship win in 2025 Ormond is the club's 2nd all-star player. He was named at centre-forward on the 2025 all-star team
Jamie Ormond	Minor Hurling 2022, 2023 U20 Hurling 2024, 2025, 2026 Senior Hurling 2026	Munster Minor Hurling 2022 All-Ireland Minor Hurling 2022 Munster U20 Hurling 2024, 2025 All-Ireland U20 Hurling 2025	Ormond was the Tipperary team captain for 2023 Munster Minor Hurling Championship.
Darren Owens	Minor Football 1995 U21 Football 1996	Munster Minor Football 1995	Owens scored the winning goal in the Munster minor decider of 1995

Note: *** Represented JK Brackens at juvenile level only

== GAA Scór ==
JK Brackens has gained notable status among the county's Scór clubs and has gained recognition nationally. This arm of the club is centered in Clonmore village where these activities are given the same level of credence as on the field activities.

Recent successes include Scór Sinsear Set Dancing Munster titles in 2013 & 2017 and an All-Ireland title in 2013. Furthermore, Clonmore man Noel Joyce has won treble Munster and All-Ireland Scór titles in 2013, 2015 and 2017 in the Recitation competition. Additionally, in 2015 Noel coached Ciarán Byrne to claim Scór na nÓg Munster and All-Ireland awards.

== Playing Fields ==
=== Páirc Shíleáin ===
Páirc Shíleáin (referred loccaly as "The Park") is the home grounds for the JK Brackens GAA club, is located in the Town Park area of Templemore Town. The pitch was first levelled, sodded and enclosed by local Templemore GAA volunteers in 1924 but this tenancy was initially a turbulent one and involved many strict conditions from landlords Templemore UDC, including no training, a fee per match played and ground sharing with the newly formed Templemore RFC. A suitable agreement was eventually reached between Templemore GAA and the Urban Council in ’53 and the venue was officially opened on 8 May 1955 when the Tipperary played Wexford in a senior hurling tournament. On that occasion the grounds were dedicated to St. Sileann, the patron saint of Templemore.

Tipperary hosted the Kilkenny hurlers on 28 May 1980 marking the officially opening of the clubhouse, The Carroll and Grant Pavilion, named in memory of two local Gaels, Arthur Carroll and Bill Grant who both won All-Ireland football medals with Tipperary in 1920, (it was also this duo who represented the club to first mark out the club grounds when acquired from the council in 1924). A spectator stand was completed in 1994, Tipperary beating Dublin in a hurling challenge on that occasion.

Since the club's foundation, Páirc Shíleáin has been the club's home ground for training and matches for both senior and juvenile clubs. Over these years several additional facilities have been added such as a spectator stand extension, a clubhouse extension, electronic scoreboard, hurling wall with an additional training area.

=== Graffin Sportsfield ===
Originally the home of Clonmore GAA club, Graffin is used as the club's second pitch for training and occasionally for home games, and it is also rented out to the Knock GAA club for that club's junior B hurling team. Located in the townland of Graffin directly 1.5 kilometres north of Clonmore village, the grounds were first acquired in 1927, it was levelled and re-sodded in 1987 with the dressing rooms built and open in 1988. During the 1970s and 1980s the Clonmore club often trained in Templemore as the village field could not handle the increased activity during this period.
