= Tipperary county football team =

Gaelic football team

Tipperary
- Sport: Football
- Irish: Tiobraid Árann
- Nickname(s): The Premier men
- County board: Tipperary GAA
- Manager: Niall Fitzgerald
- Captain: Steven O'Brien
- Home venue(s): Semple Stadium, Thurles

Recent competitive record
- Current All-Ireland status: Munster (SF) in 2025
- Last championship title: 1920
- Current NFL Division: 4 (5th in 2025)
- Last league title: None
First colours	Second colours

The Tipperary county football team represents Tipperary in men's Gaelic football and is governed by Tipperary GAA, the county board of the Gaelic Athletic Association. The team competes in the three major annual inter-county competitions; the All-Ireland Senior Football Championship, the Munster Senior Football Championship and the National Football League.

Tipperary's home ground is Semple Stadium, Thurles. The team's manager is Niall Fitzgerald.

Tipperary was the second Munster county to win an All-Ireland Senior Football Championship (SFC), as well as to appear in the final, following Limerick. The team last won the Munster Senior Championship in 2020, the All-Ireland Senior Championship in 1920 and has never won the National League.

== History ==
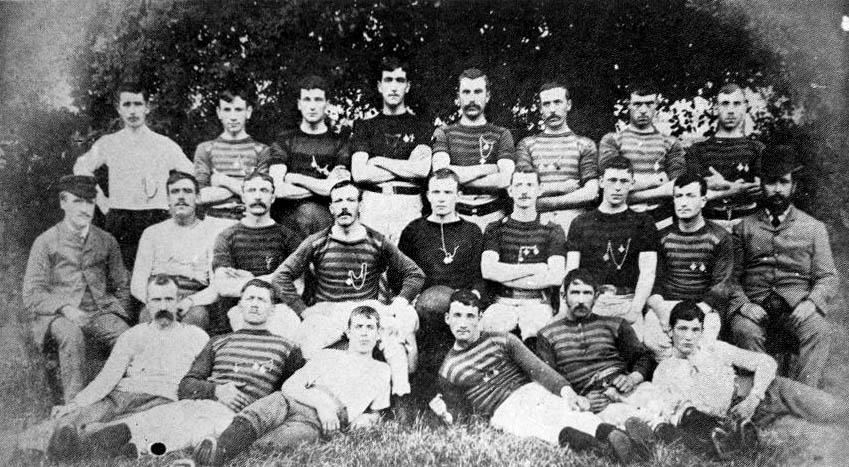
Team of Tipperary that won the 1889 All-Ireland championship

Tipperary has won the All-Ireland Senior Football Championship (SFC) on four occasions — in 1889, 1895, 1900, and 1920. Munster Senior Football Championships also followed in 1922 and 1935, but seven provincial final defeats spanning 85 years came after those until winning against Cork in the 2020 Munster Senior Football Championship final.

As the football championship is contested by a much larger number of teams than in hurling, success is hard won because of the high standard attained by many counties. For details on football history, see here.

Tipperary played in the first ever All-Ireland Qualifier in 2001, but lost by two points to Louth.

=== Kearns era: 2015–2019 ===
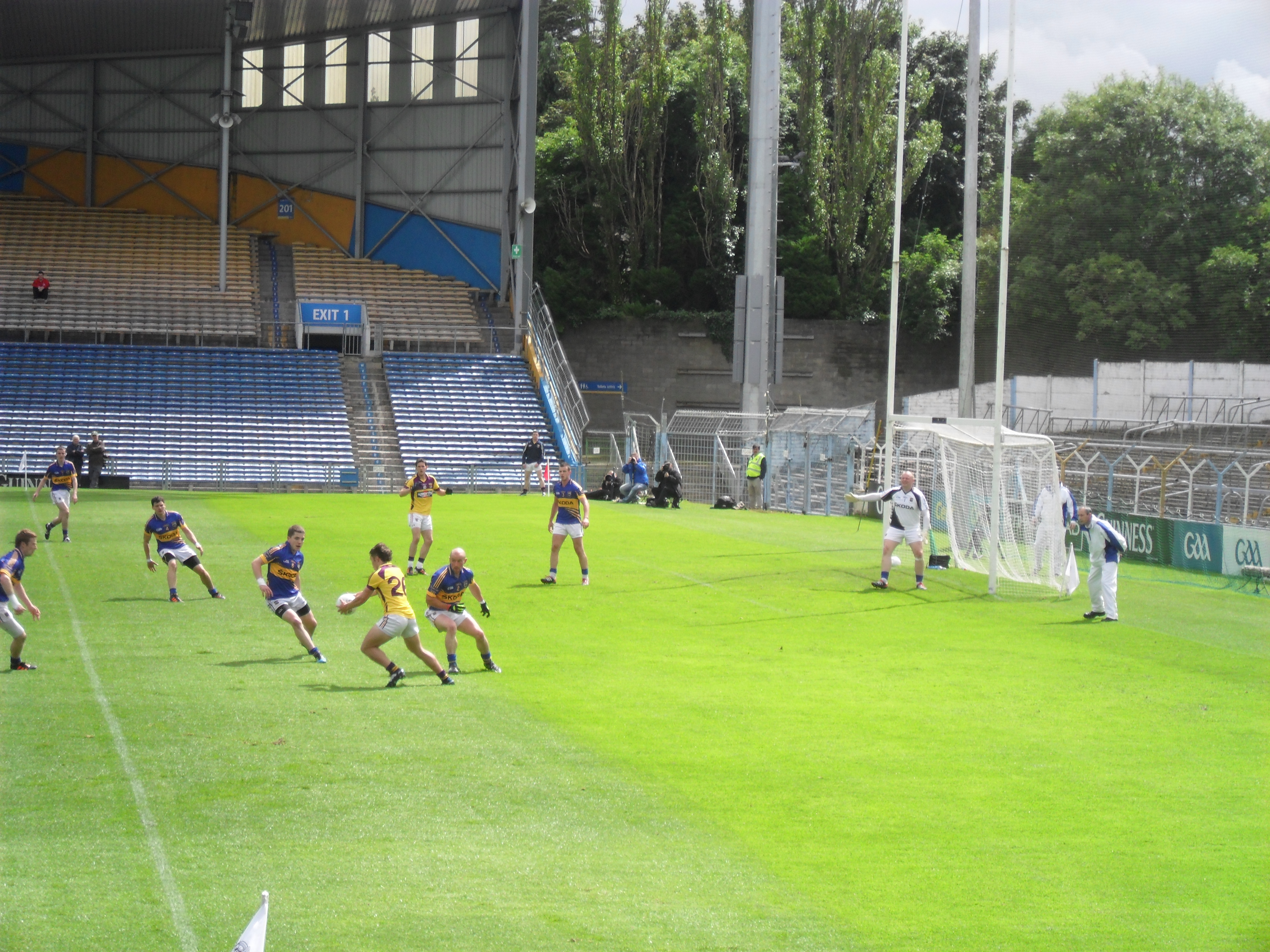
Tipperary playing Wexford in a 2012 All-Ireland SFC Round 2 Qualifier at Semple Stadium

In November 2015, Liam Kearns, from the Kerry GAA club Austin Stacks, was appointed manager, with under-21, minor and junior manager Tommy Toomey as selector and Kearns's other selectors were Paul Fitzgerald of Fethard (Tipperary) and Shane Stapleton of Golden-Kilfeacle (Tipperary).

In the 2016 All-Ireland SFC, the county reached the semi-final for the first time since 1935. Michael Quinlivan scored an early goal against Galway in the quarter-final victory. Conor Sweeney scored two more goals for Tipperary in that game.

But the following three seasons brought only two championship wins, against Waterford and Cavan, the former in 2017 and the latter in 2018. The 2017 Munster Senior Football Championship semi-final was lost to a last-minute goal conceded to opponents Cork.

Tippeary achieved promotion to Division 2 in 2017, sealed late on in the concluding game against Armagh with the completion of by a second-half hat-trick from Michael Quinlivan.

The team was relegated to Division 3 in 2019. Exit from the 2019 Munster Senior Football Championship swiftly followed, the defeat to Limerick that county's first championship victory in seven years. An All-Ireland SFC qualifier defeat to Down in Newry ended Tipperary's season and Kearns's time as manager. It was the first year since 2013 that Tipperary did not win a single championship match.

=== Power era: 2019–2023 ===
In September 2019, David Power was named as the new manager of the Tipperary senior team on a two-year term.

On 22 November 2020, Tipperary won the 2020 Munster Senior Football Championship after a 0-17 to 0-14 win against Cork in the final. It was Tipperary's first Munster SFC title in 85 years. This achievement was all the more noteworthy as Tipperary had won only four league games in their previous two campaigns.

On 6 December 2020, Tipperary played a second All-Ireland SFC semi-final in four years and again faced Mayo. In foggy conditions and losing by 16 points at half-time, the team eventually lost the game by a scoreline of 5-20 to 3-13.

Power resigned in June 2023, leaving the role vacant until Paul Kelly was appointed in late 2023.

Philly Ryan was appointed in August 2024. Niall Fitzgerald succeeded Ryan after his sudden death in 2025.

== Support ==
Friends of Tipperary Football was established in 1993. It organises fundarsing events and provides support for football in a county where hurling traditionally dominates. It has an officer board and executive committee.

== Crest and colours ==
The Tipperary players wore a white and green commemorative jersey for the 2020 Munster Senior Football Championship final - a replica of the jersey colours worn by the Tipperary team which was attacked on Bloody Sunday of 1920. At that time the county wore the colours of its county champions, not having an official jersey. The then county champions Fethard wore blue and white but Grangemockler's white and green was worn instead.

== Panel ==
Team as per Tipperary vs Kerry in the 2023 Munster SFC semi-final, 22 April 2023

No.	Player	Position	Club
1	Evan Comerford	Goalkeeper	Kilsheelan-Kilcash
2	Shane O'Connell	Right corner-back	Golden Kilfeacle
3	Jimmy Feehan	Full-back	Killenaule
4	Willie Eviston	Left corner-back	Loughmore-Castleiney
5	Kevin Fahey	Right half-back	Clonmel Commercials
6	Colman Kennedy	Centre-back	Clonmel Commercials
7	Colm O'Shaughnessy	Left half-back	Ardfinnan
8	Mark Russell	Midfield	Aherlow
9	Jack Kennedy	Midfield	Clonmel Commercials
10	Emmet Moloney	Right half-forward	Drom & Inch
11	Teddy Doyle	Centre-forward	Ballina
12	Keith Ryan	Left half-forward	Upperchurch–Drombane
13	Steven O'Brien	Right corner-forward	Ballina
14	Stephen Quirke	Full-forward	Moyle Rovers
15	Cathal Deeley	Left corner-forward	Clonmel Commercials

No.	Player	Position	Club
16	Kuba Beben	Substitute	J.K. Bracken's
17	Luke Boland	Substitute	Moyle Rovers
18	Dáire Brennan	Substitute	Ballyporeen
19	Conor Cadell	Substitute	J.K. Bracken's
20	Martin Kehoe	Substitute	Mullinahone
21	Conal Kennedy	Substitute	Clonmel Commercials
22	Donough Leahy	Substitute	Arravale Rovers
23	Tommy Maher	Substitute	Loughmore-Castleiney
24	Liam McGrath	Substitute	Loughmore-Castleiney
25	Sean O'Connor	Substitute	Clonmel Commercials
26	Mikey O'Shea	Substitute	Mullinahone

^{INJ} Player has had an injury which has affected recent involvement with the county team.
^{RET} Player has since retired from the county team.
^{WD} Player has since withdrawn from the county team due to a non-injury issue.

== Management team ==
- Manager: Niall Fitzgerald

== Managerial history ==
This is an incomplete list of Tipperary county football team managers (senior).

Dates	Name	Origin	Provincial titles	National titles
1985–1990	Johnny Mulvihill		—N/a	—N/a
1990–1991	Mickey Niblock	Clonmel Commercials	—N/a	—N/a
1991–1996	Séamus McCarthy	Galtee Rovers	—N/a	—N/a
1996–1997	Paddy Morrissey	Galtee Rovers	—N/a	—N/a
1997–1999	Colm Browne		—N/a	—N/a
1999–2000	Colm O'Flaherty	Cahir	—N/a	—N/a
2000–2003	Tom McGlinchey	Newport	—N/a	—N/a
2003–2004	Andy Shorthall		—N/a	—N/a
2004–2006	Séamus McCarthy (2)	Galtee Rovers	—N/a	2005 Tommy Murphy Cup
2006–2007	John Owens	Moyle Rovers	—N/a	—N/a
2007–2012	John Evans		—N/a	2009 NFL Division 3
2012–2015	Peter Creedon		—N/a	2014 NFL Division 4
2015–2019	Liam Kearns		—N/a	2017 NFL Division 3
2019–2023	David Power	Kilsheelan–Kilcash	2020 Munster Senior Football Championship	—N/a
2023–2024	Paul Kelly	Thomas Davis	—N/a	—N/a
2024–2025	Philly Ryan	Clonmel Commercials	—N/a	—N/a
2025–	Niall Fitzgerald	Moyle Rovers	—N/a	—N/a

== Players ==
=== Notable players ===
Notable players include:

- Philip Austin: 2006–2020
- Tommy Doyle
- Michael Hogan
- Peter Lambert
- Declan Browne
- John O'Callaghan
- Michael Quinlivan
- Conor Sweeney: until 2024

=== All Stars ===
Tipperary have won four football All Stars.

All Star winners
Awards	Players
2	Declan Browne (1998, 2003)
1	Michael Quinlivan (2016)
1	Conor Sweeney (2020)

== Team sponsorship ==
Since 1991 the following companies have sponsored all of the Tipperary county football teams.

- 1991–1992: Cidona
- 1993–1995: Hayes Hotel
- 1995–1997: Moy Insulation
- 1998–2001: Finches
- 2002–2011: Enfer Scientific
- 2011–2014: Škoda
- 2015–2018: Intersport/Elverys
- 2019–2021: Teneo
- 2022–: Fiserv

== Honours ==
=== National ===
- All-Ireland Senior Football Championship
  - (gold) Winners (4): 1889, 1895, 1900, 1920
  - (silver) Runners-up (1): 1918
- Tommy Murphy Cup
  - (gold) Winners (1): 2005
- All-Ireland Senior B Football Championship
  - (gold) Winners (1): 1995
- All-Ireland Junior Football Championship
  - (gold) Winners (3): 1912, 1923, 1998
- All-Ireland Under-21 Football Championship
  - (silver) Runners-up (1): 2015
- All-Ireland Minor Football Championship
  - (gold) Winners (2): 1934, 2011

=== Provincial ===
- Munster Senior Football Championship
  - (gold) Winners (10): 1888, 1889, 1895, 1900, 1902, 1918, 1920, 1922, 1935, 2020
  - (silver) Runners-up (18): 1894, 1899, 1907, 1923, 1926, 1928, 1930, 1931, 1932, 1933, 1939, 1943, 1944, 1993, 1994, 1998, 2002, 2016
- Munster Junior Football Championship
  - (gold) Winners (7): 1910, 1912, 1923, 1935, 1937, 1952, 1998
- Munster Under-21 Football Championship
  - (gold) Winners (2): 2010, 2015
- Munster Minor Football Championship
  - (gold) Winners (7): 1934, 1935, 1955, 1984, 1995, 2011, 2012
- McGrath Cup
  - (gold) Winners (3): 1989, 1993, 2003
- Munster Football League
  - (gold) Winners (2): 1929–30, 1934–35
