= 1920 All-Ireland Senior Football Championship =

All-Ireland Champions
- Winning team: Tipperary (4th win)
- Captain: Jerry Shelly

All-Ireland Finalists
- Losing team: Dublin
- Captain: P McDonnell

Provincial Champions
- Munster: Tipperary
- Leinster: Dublin
- Ulster: Cavan
- Connacht: Mayo

Championship statistics

The 1920 All-Ireland Senior Football Championship was the 34th staging of Ireland's premier Gaelic football knock-out competition.

In the Leinster final Dublin ended Kildare's period as All Ireland champions.

The championship was disrupted by the ongoing Irish War of Independence, including the events of Bloody Sunday in November 1920, when British forces killed fourteen people at a match between Dublin and Tipperary at Croke Park in Dublin. Because Dublin and Tipperary were the eventual finalists, it is often incorrectly assumed that this was the All-Ireland final, but it was actually a challenge match held to raise funds for the Republican Prisoners Dependents Fund. In fact, Tipperary did not play their semi-final match until 1922, 19 months after Dublin won the first semi-final.

The Final was played in June 1922. Tipperary beat Dublin by 1–6 to 1–2.

100 years later, the same four teams appeared in the semi-finals, with Cavan also playing Dublin and Mayo also playing Tipperary, confirmed on the weekend of the centenary of Bloody Sunday with the championship delayed by the COVID-19 pandemic.

== Fixtures ==
=== Connacht ===
Connacht Senior Football Championship

4 July 1920
Quarter-Final

Leitrim	3–3 – 0–2	Roscommon

Elphin

18 July 1920
Semi-Final

Galway	0–3 – 2–4	Mayo

Castlerea

8 August 1920
Semi-Final

Sligo	1–7 – 0–2	Leitrim

Elphin

22 August 1920
Final

Mayo	2–3 – 1–4	Sligo

Castlerea
Attendance: 2,000

=== Leinster ===
Leinster Senior Football Championship

1920
Preliminary Round

Kilkenny	0–3 – 2–1	Laois

Kilkenny

1920
Preliminary Round

Westmeath	2–2 – 2–1	Longford

Mullingar

1920
Preliminary Round

Wicklow	1–7 – 3–2	Carlow

Tullow

1920
Preliminary Round

Meath	0–1 – 1–4	Louth

Dundalk

1920
Quarter-Final

Westmeath	0–6 – 0–3	Louth

Navan

1920
Quarter-Final

Laois	3–5 – 2–2	Carlow

16 May 1920
Quarter-Final

Dublin	3–3 – 0–3	Offaly

Maryboro

13 June 1920
Quarter-Final

Kildare	2–6 – 1–2	Wexford

Croke Park, Dublin

1920
Semi-Final

Dublin	2–6 – 0–1	Laois

Croke Park, Dublin

15 August 1920
Semi-Final

Kildare	1–5 – 0–1	Westmeath

Croke Park, Dublin

29 August 1920
Final

Dublin	1–3 – 0–3	Kildare
Paddy Carey 1–0, Bill Robbins (0-1f), Frank Burke, Stephen Synott 0–1 each		Joyce Conlan 0–2 and Albert O'Neill 0-1f

Croke Park, Dublin
Referee: PD Breen (Wexford)

=== Munster ===
Munster Senior Football Championship

1920
Quarter-Final

Waterford	3-2– 1–1	Limerick

Dungarvan

6 June 1920
Quarter-Final

Clare	1-2– 1–2	Tipperary

Limerick
Referee: P. Parfrey ( C )

1920
Quarter-Final 1st Replay

Clare	0-2– 0–2 A.E.T.	Tipperary

15 August 1920
Quarter-Final 2nd Replay

Tipperary	1–7 – 0–1	Clare

Clonmel
Referee: W. Benn ( T )

20 June 1920
Semi-Final

Kerry	2–6 – 0–4	Cork

Cork Athletic Grounds

19 February 1922
Semi-Final

Tipperary	3–4 – 0–1	Waterford

Dungarvan
Referee: W. Walsh (Waterford)

9 April 1922
Final

Tipperary	2–2 – 0–2	Kerry

Cork Athletic Grounds
Referee: W. Walsh (Waterford)

=== Ulster ===
Ulster Senior Football Championship

9 May 1920
Quarter-Final

Down	0–10 – 0–5	Antrim

Newcastle

16 May 1920
Quarter-Final

Armagh	2–1 – 0–0	Tyrone

Dungannon

23 May 1920
Preliminary Round

Cavan	2–2 – 1–3	Monaghan

Clones

23 May 1920
Quarter-Final

Derry	0–11 – 0–7	Donegal

Derry

13 June 1920
Quarter-Final

Cavan	8–3 – 2–1	Fermanagh

Wattlebridge

20 June 1920
Semi-Final

Armagh	0–4 – 0–3	Down

Camlough

23 July 1920
Semi-Final

Cavan	3–4 – 0–1	Derry

Belturbet

8 August 1920
Final

Cavan	4–6 – 1–4	Armagh

Cootehill

=== Semi-finals ===
26 September 1920
Semi-Final

Dublin	3–6 – 1–3	Cavan

Navan

7 May 1922
Semi-Final

Tipperary	1–5 – 1–0	Mayo

Croke Park, Dublin

=== Final ===
11 June 1922
Final

Tipperary	1–6 – 1–2	Dublin
T Powell (1–03), V Vaughan (0–02) & G McCarthy (0–01).	Report	Frank Burke (1-00), P McDonnell (0-01) & S Synott (0-01).

Croke Park, Dublin
Attendance: 17,000
Referee: W. Walsh (Waterford)

Bracket

Semi-Finals
Dublin	3–6
Cavan	1–3
Tipperary	1–5
Mayo	1–0

Final
Dublin	1–2
Tipperary	1–6
