= Dublin Under 21 Football Championship =

- Irish: Craobh Faoi 21 Peile; Bhaile Átha Cliath
- Title holders: Ballinteer St Johns (2nd title)
- Most titles: St. Vincent's (8 titles)
- Sponsors: Evening Herald

The Dublin Under 21 Football Championship is an annual Gaelic Athletic Association club competition between the under-21 Gaelic footballers of Dublin clubs. The current (2025) under 21 champions of Dublin are Ballinteer St John’s.

== Under 21 A Championship ==
=== Top Winners ===
#	Club	Wins	Years won
1	St. Vincent's	8	1973, 1978, 1980, 1982, 1984, 1993, 1994, 2004
2	Ballymun Kickhams	6	1990, 1991, 1996, 2007, 2008, 2018
3	Na Fianna	5	1977, 2011, 2012, 2013, 2017
3	Kilmacud Crokes	5	1983, 1988, 2002, 2015, 2016
4	Ballyboden St. Enda's	6	1995, 1997, 2003, 2014, 2023, 2024
5	Ballinteer St. John’s Lucan Sarsfields	2 2	2022, 2025 2006, 2010
6	Cuala	1	2019
6	Skerries Harps	1	2021

== 2022 Under 21 Football Final ==
26 November 2022; 14:00	Ballinteer St. John's	2-16 - 0-6	Ballyboden St. Enda's	O'Toole Park; Referee: Darren Delaney (Wanderers GAA Ballyboden); Man of the Match: Luke Breathnach
26 November 2022; 14:00	Luke Breathnach (1-8), Mark McNally (1-0), Oisin Grady (0-3) Jack Lundy (0-2), Liam Smyth, Finán Chambers, Matthew Gardiner 0-1 each	Report	Daire Sweeney 0-3, Hugh O'Sullivan (0-1), Malachy Codd, Luke Byrne 0-1 each	O'Toole Park; Referee: Darren Delaney (Wanderers GAA Ballyboden); Man of the Match: Luke Breathnach

== Under 21 Football Final ==
9 December 2017	Na Fianna	2-11 - 0-9	Ballyboden St. Enda's	O'Toole Park; Referee: Joe Dromgoole (Fingallians); Man of the Match: Sean Caffrey
9 December 2017	Sean Caffrey 0-4, Alistair Fitzgerald and James Doran 1-1 each, Gavin King 0-2, Jonathan Treacy (1 '45), Glenn O'Reilly, Aaron Byrne 0-1 each	Report	Colm Basquel 0-5 (0-4f, 1 '45), James Madden, Warren Egan, Ross McGarry, Dylan Walsh 0-1 each	O'Toole Park; Referee: Joe Dromgoole (Fingallians); Man of the Match: Sean Caffrey

=== Roll of Honour ===
Year	Winner	Score	Opponent	Score
2025	Ballinteer St. John's	1-16	St Jude's	1-10
2024	Ballyboden St. Enda's	1-13	Na Fianna	0-06
2023	Ballyboden St. Enda's	0-16	Ballymun Kickhams	1-01
2022	Ballinteer St. John's	2-16	Ballyboden St. Enda's	0-06
2021	Skerries Harps	1-08	Whitehall Colmcille	1-07
2020	No Championship			
2019	Cuala	2-16	Na Fianna	2-15
2018	Ballymun Kickhams	2-14	Thomas Davis	1-07
2017	Na Fianna	2-11	Ballyboden St. Enda's	0-09
2016	Kilmacud Crokes	0-12	Ballymun Kickhams	0-06
2015	Kilmacud Crokes	3-10	St. Vincent's	1-05
2014	Ballyboden St. Enda's	1-05	Raheny	0-07
2013	Na Fianna	1-08	Ballyboden St. Enda's	1-06
2012	Na Fianna		Kilmacud Crokes	
2011	Na Fianna	1-10	Kilmacud Crokes	1-08
2010	Lucan Sarsfields	2-13	Na Fianna	2-11
2009	Cuala	2-07	Kilmacud Crokes	0-06
2008	Ballymun Kickhams	2-11	Thomas Davis	1-07
2007	Ballymun Kickhams	0-14	Na Fianna	1-09
2006	Lucan Sarsfields	1-09	Kilmacud Crokes	0-11
2005	St Jude's		St. Brigid's	
2004	St. Vincent's	0-08	St. Brigid's	0-06
2003	Ballyboden St. Enda's		Round Towers Clondalkin	
2002	Kilmacud Crokes	0-11	St Jude's	0-04
2001	UCD		St. Brigid's	
2000	UCD		St. Brigid's	
1999	UCD		Ballyboden St. Enda's	
1998				
1997	Ballyboden St. Enda's			
1996	Ballymun Kickhams		St. Sylvesters	
1995	Ballyboden St. Enda's		Trinity Gaels	
1994	St. Vincent's			
1993	St. Vincent's			
1992	Thomas Davis	1-07	Fingallians	0-08
1991	Ballymun Kickhams	3-10	Thomas Davis	1-04
1990	Ballymun Kickhams			
1989	Round Towers Clondalkin		Naomh Ólaf	
1988	Kilmacud Crokes	0-14	Synge St.	1-05
1987	Whitehall Colmcille			
1986	Whitehall Colmcille			
1985	Whitehall Colmcille			
1984	St. Vincent's		St Oliver Plunketts	
1983	Kilmacud Crokes		An Caislean	
1982	St. Vincent's		Scoil Ui Chonaill	
1981	Erin's Hope	2-05	Scoil Ui Chonaill	0-08
1980	St. Vincent's	4-13	Thomas Davis	1-02
1979	Erin's Isle			
1978	St. Vincent's			
1977	Na Fianna			
1976	Cuala		Kilmacud Crokes	
1975	Erin's Hope			
1974	Erin's Hope			
1973	St. Vincent's		St Enda's, Crumlin	
1972	Raheny		Scoil Ui Chonaill	
1971	UCD			
1970	Erin's Hope			
1969	UCD			
1968	UCD			
1967	Scoil Ui Chonaill			
1966	Erin's Hope			
1965	Clanna Gael			
1964	Round Towers Clondalkin			

== Under 21 B Football Championship ==
Year	Winner	Score	Opponent	Score
2025	Skerries Harps	1-14	St Patrick's, Donabate	1-13
2024	St. Brigid's	0-10	Thomas Davis	0-07
2023	Clontarf	1-13	Castleknock	1-10
2022	Lucan Sarsfields	1-19	Thomas Davis	1-11
2021	Ballinteer St. Johns	0-17	Cuala	0-12
2019	St. Vincent's		Ballinteer St. Johns	
2018	Clontarf	4-12	Skerries Harps	4-11
2017	Round Towers, Lusk		Skerries Harps	
2016	St. Sylvesters	2-13	Raheny	0-13
2015	St. Brigid's	1-10	Castleknock	2-05
2014	Skerries Harps	1-06	Templeogue Synge St	0-07
2013	Ballymun Kickhams	2-05	Raheny	0-06
2012	Ballinteer St. Johns		Thomas Davis	
2011	Thomas Davis		Naomh Mearnóg	
2010	Erin's Isle			
2009				
2008				
2007				
2006				
2005				
2004				
2003	Skerries Harps			

== Under 21 C Football Championship ==
Year	Winner	Score	Opponent	Score
2025	Whitehall Colmcille	2-07	Raheny	0-11
2024	St. Sylvester's	4-06	O'Dwyer's	1-07
2023	Skerries Harps	1-14	St. Judes's	0-11
2022	Templeogue Synge St	2-11	St. Brigid's	1-08
2019	Templeogue Synge St		Naomh Mearnóg	
2018	Erin's Isle	2-08	Round Towers Clondalkin	2-06
2017	St. Margaret's	1-25	Ballyboden St. Enda's	0-12
2016	Naomh Mearnóg		Erin's Isle	
2015				
2014				
2013	Na Fianna	3-09	Clan na Gael Fontenoy	0-03
2012				
2011	Castleknock	1-15	Naomh Barróg	1-12
2010				
2009	Naomh Mearnóg	0-11	Round Towers Clondalkin	0-07
2008	Ballinteer St. Johns	1-10	Naomh Mearnóg	0-07
2007				
2006				
2005				
2004	Ballyboden St. Enda's			
2003				

== Under 21 D Football Championship ==
Year	Winner	Score	Opponent	Score
2025	Fingallians	0-16	St. Maur's	1-04
2024	St. Mary's, Saggart	5-01	Na Fianna	2-08
2023	Round Towers Clondalkin	2-07	Whitehall Colmcille	1-04
2016	Na Fianna	2-20	Trinity Gaels	0-13
2015				
2014				
2013				
2012				
2011	Na Fianna		Kilmacud Crokes	

== Under 21 E Football Championship ==
Year	Winner	Score	Opponent	Score
2025	St. Margaret's	2-10	St. Anne's	2-08
2024	St. Maur's		Trinity Gaels	
2023	Parnells	2-10	St. Judes's	1-02
2011	Good Counsel		St. Margaret's	

== Under 21 F Football Championship ==
Year	Winner	Score	Opponent	Score
2025	Round Towers Clondalkin	4-11	Man O'War	1-09
2024	Beann Eadair	6-11	Parnells	2-05
2023	Castleknock	2-07	St. Peregrine's	0-10

== Under 21 G Football Championship ==
Year	Winner	Score	Opponent	Score
2025	Clanna Gael Fontenoy	0-11	O'Toole's	0-10
2024	Trinity Gaels	3-11	St. Mark's	2-04

== Under 21 H Football Championship ==
Year	Winner	Score	Opponent	Score
2025	Ballyboden St. Enda's	6-06	St. Vincent's	1-10
2024	Clanna Gael Fontenoy	0-11	Castleknock	2-04
