= Dublin Junior Football Championship =

Gaelic football competition in Ireland

Junior Football Championship
- Irish: Craobh Shóisear Peile; Bhaile Átha Cliath
- Founded: 1928
- Title holders: St Finian's GAA (Swords) (2nd title)
- Most titles: St Vincents (6 titles)
- Sponsors: Go Ahead Transport

The Dublin Junior Football 1 Championship is the Junior Gaelic Athletic Association Gaelic football competition of Dublin. The winners of the Junior championship go on to qualify for the Dublin Intermediate Football Championship. The winners will also represent Dublin in the Leinster Junior Club Football Championship. St Vincent's are the most successful club in the Junior A championship having won the competition on six occasions, with their most recent victory in 2014 beating Craobh Chiaráin in the final.

== Format ==
In 2018, the grading system of Junior Championships was drastically changed. The Dublin Junior Football Championship is divided between Junior 1 and 2.

Junior 1 consists of 16 teams who are divided into four groups of four. The top two sides in each group are then included in an open draw for the quarter-finals of the championship. The team that wins the Dublin Junior Football Championship is promoted to the Dublin Intermediate Championship. The teams that finish at the bottom of their respective groups go on to play in a relegation championship. The eventual loser drops to the Dublin Junior Football Championship 2.

Junior 2 consists of 14 teams who are divided into two groups of three and two groups of four. The top two sides in each group are then included in an open draw for the quarter-finals of the championship. No team can be relegated from the Dublin Junior Football Championship 2.

A club that has a team in the Intermediate or Senior Championship will compete in the All County Championship. The all county championship is divided in three divisions and participation will vary each year depending on each club's performance in higher graded divisions. The winner of each all county championship will progress to a higher ranking all county championship if they do not already have a side in that championship.

== Junior Football A ==
#	Team	Wins	Years won
1	St Vincents	6	1976, 1984, 1991, 1995, 1997, 2014
2	Innisfails	4	1937, 1943, 1973, 2001
3	Craobh Chiaráin	3	1964, 2019, 2024
3	St. Sylvester's	3	1939, 1963, 1989
3	Fingallians	3	1942, 1956, 1993
3	Round Towers Lusk	3	1962, 1992, 2015
4	Man-O-War	2	1979, 2023
4	Garristown	2	1965, 2022
4	Peadar Mackens	2	1934, 1947
4	Sean McDermotts	2	1932, 1944
4	St Joseph's	2	1929, 1959
4	Thomas Davis	2	1957, 1982
4	Parnells	2	1983, 2011
4	St Brigid's	2	1996, 2010
4	Naomh Maur	2	1951, 1972
4	Ballyboden Wanderers	2	1928, 1968
4	Ballyboughal	2	1967, 2009
4	Erin's Isle	2	1953, 2007
4	Na Fianna	2	1975, 2005
4	Skerries Harps	2	1943, 1954
4	Lucan Sarsfields	2	1977, 2003
4	St Patrick's, Donabate	2	1980, 2008
4	Fingal Ravens	2	1969, 1999
4	Cuala	2	1978, 2013
4	Kilmacud Crokes	2	1986, 2016
4	St Finian's, Swords	2	2000, 2025
5	St Marks	1	2021
5	St Oliver Plunketts Eoghan Ruadh	1	2017
5	St Mary's, Saggart	1	2002
5	St Marnocks	1	1936
5	St Pauls	1	1935
5	Portrane	1	1946
5	Pioneers	1	1933
5	Star of the Sea	1	1949
5	Eastern Command	1	1952
5	O'Tooles	1	1945
5	Clann O'Tooles	1	1931
5	Brian Boru	1	1930
5	Crumlin	1	2006
5	Inchicore Gaels	1	1958
5	Naomh Mearnóg	1	2004
5	St. Peregrines	1	1998
5	Clann Mhuire	1	1994
5	Ard Craobh	1	1941
5	St. Margarets	1	1940
5	Naomh Fionbarra	1	1961
5	Clanna Gael	1	1955
5	Naomh Ólaf	1	1990
5	Whitehall Colmcille	1	1966
5	Wolfe Tones	1	1938
5	Trinity Gaels	1	1988
5	St Monica's	1	1987
5	Rosmini Gaels	1	1985
5	Rialto Gaels	1	1960
5	Naomh Barróg	1	1981
5	Beann Eadair	2	1974, 2026
5	O'Dwyer's	2	1950, 2020
5	St Brendan's	1	1971
5	Synge Street PP	1	1970
5	Castleknock	1	2012
5	St Finian's, Newcastle	1	2018

=== Roll of Honour ===
Year	Winner	Score	Opponent	Score
2026	Lucan Sarsfields	1-11	Cuala	2-05
2025	St Finian's, Swords	0-18	St Finian's, Newcastle	2-04
2024	Craobh Chiaráin	2-16	Ranelagh Gaels	1-07
2023	Man-O-War	2-09	O'Dwyers	0-10
2022	Garristown	2-07	St Finian's, Swords	2-06
2021	St Marks	0-10	Geraldine Moran's	1-05
2020	O'Dwyers	0-17	St Monica's	1-06
2019	Craobh Chiaráin	1-14	St Brendan's	1-06
2018	St Finian's, Newcastle	2-10	Craobh Chiaráin	1-14
2017	St Oliver Plunketts Eoghan Ruadh	1-11	Ballymun Kickhams	0-12
2016	Kilmacud Crokes	2-09	St Oliver Plunketts Eoghan Ruadh	1-11
2015	Round Towers Lusk	4-12	Raheny	1-10
2014	St Vincent's	5-05	Craobh Chiaráin	2-12
2013	Cuala	2-14	St Monica's	1-12
2012	Castleknock	2-22	Raheny	1-07
2011	Parnells	1-10	Man O'War	0-07
2010	St Brigid's	0-14	St Jude's	0-04
2009	Ballyboughal	0-13	Man O'War	1-07
2008	St Patrick's, Donabate		Round Towers	
2007	Erin's Isle	2-08	Whitehall Colmcille	0-11
2006	Crumlin		Castleknock	
2005	Na Fianna		Round Towers	
2004	Naomh Mearnóg			
2003	Lucan Sarsfields			
2002	St Mary's, Saggart			
2001	Innisfails			
2000	St Finian's, Swords			
1999	Fingal Ravens		St Finian's, Swords	
1998	St. Peregrines	1-14	Innisfails	1-10
1997	St Vincent's			
1996	St Brigid's			
1995	St Vincent's			
1994	Clann Mhuire			
1993	Fingallians		Postal Gaels	
1992	Round Towers Lusk	0-11	St Vincent's	0-08
1991	St Vincent's			
1990	Naomh Ólaf			
1989	St. Sylvester's		Cuala	
1988	Trinity Gaels	1-08	Cuala	1-07
1987	St Monica's			
1986	Kilmacud Crokes		Thomas Davis	
1985	Rosmini Gaels		Ballymun Kickhams	
1984	St Vincent's		St. Margaret's	
1983	Parnells		Churchtown	
1982	Thomas Davis			
1981	Naomh Barróg			
1980	St Patrick's, Donabate			
1979	Man O'War		Fingallians	
1978	Cuala		St Vincent's	
1977	Lucan Sarsfields		Park Rangers	
1976	St Vincent's			
1975	Na Fianna			
1974	Beann Eadair			
1973	Innisfails			
1972	St Maur's			
1971	St Brendan's			
1970	Synge Street PP			
1969	Fingal Ravens			
1968	Ballyboden Wanderers	1-08	St. Colmcilles	0-06
1967	Ballyboughal		St Maur's	
1966	Whitehall Colmcille			
1965	Garristown			
1964	Craobh Chiaráin		St Gerard's, Walkinstown	
1963	St. Sylvester's			
1962	Round Towers Lusk		Ballyboughal	
1961	Naomh Fionbarra			
1960	Rialto Gaels			
1959	St Joseph's		St Caillian's	
1958	Inchicore Gaels		Round Towers, Lusk	
1957	Thomas Davis			
1956	Fingallians			
1955	Clanna Gael			
1954	Skerries Harps			
1953	Erin's Isle			
1952	Eastern Command			
1951	St Maurs		Skerries Harps	
1950	O'Dwyer's			
1949	Star of the Sea		St Maur's	
1948	Innisfails			
1947	Peadar Mackens		Ballyboughal	
1946	Portrane			
1945	O'Tooles			
1944	Sean McDermotts			
1943	Skerries Harps		Parish Gaels	
1942	Fingallians		O'Dwyer's	
1941	Ard Craobh			
1940	St Margaret's			
1939	St. Sylvester's			
1938	Wolfe Tones			
1937	Innisfails			
1936	St. Marnocks		Fingallians	
1935	St Paul's		Innisfails	
1934	Peadar Mackens			
1933	Pioneers			
1932	Sean McDermotts			
1931	Clan O'Tooles			
1930	Brian Boru			
1929	St Joseph's			
1928	Ballyboden Wanderers			
1927	St Joseph's			

== Junior Football B ==
=== Roll of Honour ===
Junior B Football Championship
- Irish: Craobh Shóisear Peile; Bhaile Átha Cliath
- Founded: 1993
- Title holders: Skerries Harps (1st title)
- First winner: St Brendan's
- Most titles: St. Sylvester's (2 titles)
- Sponsors: ?

Year	Winner	Score	Opponent	Score
2025				
2024	St. Anne's		St Mary's	
2023				
2022	Fingal Ravens	1-09	St Oliver Plunketts Eoghan Ruadh	0-09
2021				
2020	Wanderers	1-10	Ballyfermot	0-08
2019	Stars of Erin	1-12	Beann Eadair	1-09
2018	Ranelagh Gaels	1-13	Ballyfermot	2-08
2017	Skerries Harps	3-17	St Oliver Plunketts Eoghan Ruadh	1-09
2016	Ballymun Kickhams	3-09	Wanderers	1-06
2015	Fingallians	2-17	Bank Of Ireland	3-08
2014	St. Sylvester's	0-13	Civil Service	0-08
2013	Whitehall Colmcille	2-11	Fingallians	0-06
2012	St James Gaels	1-10	St Maur's	0-06
2011	Ballyboden St Enda's	3-07	St. Maur's	1-09
2010	Na Fianna	1-14	Skerries Harps	1-07
2009	Parnells	1-11	St. Sylvester's	0-05
2008	Cuala	0-10	St Vincent's	0-09
2007	Fingal Ravens		St Vincent's	
2006	St Brigid's	1-14	Man O'War	1-09
2005	Liffey Gaels	1-07	St Vincent's	0-09
2004	St Joseph's/OCB		St Vincent's	
2003				
2002	Naomh Ólaf	2-04	Naomh Jude's	0-02
2001	Lucan Sarsfields		St Kevins Killians	
2000	St Kevins Killians		Kilmacud Crokes	
1999	St. Sylvester's		St Vincent's	
1998	Naomh Mearnóg			
1997				
1996	AIB	2-14	St Vincent's	0-11
1995				
1994				
1993	St Brendan's			

== Junior Football C/3 ==
The 2020 Junior 3 All County Football Championship will be contested by Clontarf and St Patrick's, Donabate.

=== Roll of Honour ===
Junior C Football Championship
- Irish: Craobh Shóisear Peile; Bhaile Átha Cliath
- Founded: ?
- Title holders: St Vincents (2nd title)
- First winner: ?
- Most titles: Ballinteer St. Johns (3 titles)
- Sponsors: ?

Year	Winner	Score	Opponent	Score
2025				
2024	St. Sylvester's		St Jude's	
2023				
2022				
2021				
2020	St Patrick's, Donabate		Clontarf	
2019	Round Towers Lusk	0-13	Na Fianna	0-11
2018	Cuala	1-11	Na Fianna	0-08
2017	St Brigid's	2-17	Lucan Sarsfields	2-15
2016	St Vincent's	3-09	Lucan Sarsfields	1-12
2015	Ballinteer St. Johns	1-07	Castleknock	0-09
2014	Raheny	1-15	Round Towers Clondalkin	0-08
2013	Thomas Davis	3-13	Stars of Erin	2-09
2012	Ballyboden St Enda's	2-11	Naomh Fionbarra	0-09
2011	Parnells		Ballyboden St Enda's	
2010	St Vincent's	3-12	St Brigid's	1-06
2009	St Oliver Plunketts ER	1-11	Clontarf	0-06
2008	Ballinteer St. Johns	2-06	Erin's Isle	0-08
2007	Ballinteer St. Johns	2-07	St Jude's	2-10
2006				
2005				
2004	Ballyboden St Enda's			
2003	St Brigid's			
2002	O'Dwyer's		Ballinteer St. Johns	

== Junior Football D ==
=== Roll of Honour ===
Junior 4 All County Football Championship
- Irish: Craobh Shóisear Peile; Bhaile Átha Cliath
- Founded: ?
- Title holders: St Finians, Swords (1st title)
- First winner: ?
- Most titles: Kilmacud Crokes (2 titles)
- Sponsors: Jameson

Year	Winner	Score	Opponent	Score
2025				
2024	St Patrick's, Donabate		Ballyboden St Enda's	
2023				
2022				
2021				
2020	St Finian's, Swords	0-18	St. Jude's	0-14
2019	Kilmacud Crokes	2-14	Raheny	1-12
2018	Round Towers Lusk	3-08	Raheny	2-07
2017	Kilmacud Crokes	1-14	Starlights	1-10
2016	Naomh Ólaf	2-17	St Oliver Plunketts Eoghan Ruadh	0-11
2015	St Jude's	1-13	St Finian's, Swords	1-10
2014	Na Fianna	1-15	St Oliver Plunketts Eoghan Ruadh	1-09
2013	Fingallians	2-08	St Patrick's, Palmerstown	1-10
2012	Cuala	0-08	Ballyboughal	1-04
2011	St Anne's	3-12	Erin go Bragh	0-07
2010	Stars of Erin	1-06	Wild Geese	0-06
2009	St. Sylvester's		Parnells	
2008	St Brigid's		St Anne's	
2007				
2006				
2005				
2004				
2003	St Jude's			
2002	St. Sylvester's			

== Junior Football E ==
Junior 5 All County Football Championship
- Irish: Craobh Shóisear Peile; Bhaile Átha Cliath
- Founded: 2008
- Title holders: Ballyfermot De La Salle (1st title)
- First winner: Park Rangers
- Most titles: Rosmini Gaels (2 titles)
- Sponsors: P.J. Carroll and Company

The Junior E Championship was created at the start of the 2008 season and is open to clubs who only have one adult team taking part in the Adult Football Leagues.

This championship is played on a round robin format which gives each team three championship games a year.

Park Rangers won the First Junior E Final in 2008, defeating Wild Geese, who themselves would taste glory a year later in 2009.

In 2010 Rosmini Gaels won their first championship since winning the original Junior A championship in 1985. Two players from the '85 team played in the 2010 final. Rosmini Gaels repeated their victory in 2012.

The 2014 Junior E Final took place on September 20 between St Kevin Killians and St Colmcilles of Swords in O'Toole Park. In a hard-fought close game, St Colmcilles came out on top to claim the first championship win in the history of the club and in the process going one step further than the previous year in which they finished up as runners-up.

AIB defeated Rosmini Gaels in the 2015 final after extra time to claim their first Junior E title.

In 2016 Cloghran outfit Starlights lifted the crown defeating Beann Eadair in the final.

=== Roll of Honour ===
Year	Winner	Score	Opponent	Score
2025	Clanna Gael Fontenoy	2-09	Naomh Mearnóg	0-11
2024	Raheny		Garristown	
2023				
2022				
2021	Kilmacud Crokes	1-07	Castleknock	1-06
2020	St Brigid's	1-18	Clann Mhuire	2-08
2019	Ballyboden St Enda's	1-12	Skerries Harps	1-09
2018	Parnells	0-13	Skerries Harps	0-08
2017	Ballyfermot De La Salle	1-14	Rosmini Gaels	1-11
2016	Starlights	2-16	Beann Eadair	0-05
2015	AIB		Rosmini Gaels	
2014	St. Colmcille's (Swords)	1-08	St Kevin's Killians	0-09
2013	Croi Ro Naofa		St. Colmcille's (Swords)	
2012	Rosmini Gaels	1-08	St Kevin's Killians	1-05
2011	Geraldine Morans	2-13	Tyrrelstown	2-05
2010	Rosmini Gaels	0-10	Croi Ro Naofa	0-08
2009	Wild Geese	2-08	St Brendan's	0-09
2008	Park Rangers		Wild Geese	

== Junior Football F/6 ==
The First ever Dublin Junior 6 All County Football Final was contested by St Annes and Clontarf

Junior 6 All County Football Championship
- Irish: Craobh Shóisear Sé Peile; Bhaile Átha Cliath
- Founded: 2020
- Title holders: St Marks
- First winner: Clontarf
- Most titles: St Marks (1 titles)

=== Roll of Honour ===
Year	Winner	Score	Opponent	Score
2021	St Marks	4-11	Lucan Sarsfields	0-09
2020	Clontarf	4-18	St Annes	1-09
