= Naomh Mearnóg CLG =

Naomh Mearnóg
- Founded: 1975
- County: Dublin
- Nickname: Mearnógs
- Colours: Black and amber
- Grounds: Páirc Mhearnóg, Portmarnock
- Coordinates: 53°26′16.18″N 6°08′39.12″W

Playing kits
Standard colours

Senior Club Championships
	All Ireland	Leinster champions	Dublin champions
Camogie:	0	0	1

Naomh Mearnóg is a Gaelic Athletic Association club in the parish of Portmarnock, County Dublin, Ireland. The club was founded in 1975 and now fields a total of 35 teams in football, hurling, camogie and ladies' football. These include three adult football teams, two adult hurling teams, two adult camogie teams and an adult ladies' football team. They also cater for many juvenile teams.

== History ==
=== Early years ===
In the late 1920s and early 1930s, there were two grades of adult inter-club football: senior and junior. It was the same at inter-county level. However, the interest in inter-county football was nothing like it is nowadays, most of the focus was on the inter-club scene.

In the late 1920s, there was a temporary break-up of Innisfails' junior football team in Balgriffin, and as a result it was decided to form a team in Portmarnock. At that time, Portmarnock would have been what is now called 'Old Portmarnock'. The population was sparse and if a team lost a few players it found it very difficult to survive. The team was named St Marnock's after a contemporary of St Patrick, who first introduced Christianity to Portmarnock. The team wore a black jersey with an amber sash, the colours of which were inspired by the crest of the Jameson family, of whiskey fame, who lived locally.

Success came to the newly formed team quite quickly. In their first year of competition, they were runners-up in Division 3 of the Fingal League. In the following years, they won the Fingal League Division 1 on two occasions and the Fingal Championship once. During those years, 7-a-side tournaments were very popular and drew huge crowds to the venues. St Marnock's were beaten in extra time by St Margaret's in the final of the Swords tournament played on a Monday in August 1930. They won the Fintan Lalor tournament, beating Erin's Isle in the final. This final was played at ‘The Thatch’, where the present Catholic Church stands in Whitehall. Quite often, St Marnock's travelled to their ‘away’ games by train. The club secretary would fill in a form by the Thursday before the game and the team consequently travelled at a reduced rate.

As early as 1935, St Marnock's were unable to field a team against Innisfails, who were back playing again, at Brian Boru Park. St Marnock's had won the game by 1–1 to 0–1 but Innisfails were objecting to them being awarded the points because the list of players supplied by St Marnock's contained only 14 names. The game was refixed for the following Sunday in Parnell Park. St Marnock's were already in danger of breaking up. As things worked out they did not break up and Innisfails went on to reach the final of the Dublin Junior Football Championship only to be beaten by St Paul's by 1–3 to 0–3. The following September, St Marnock's beat the reigning Dublin Junior Football Champions, St Paul's, in the semi-final of the Loving Cup by 1–4 to 0–2.

St Marnock's original kit (1920s–1930s)

The greatest achievement of this team was beating Fingallians in the final of 1936 Dublin Junior Football Championship in Parnell Park. This promoted the club to senior ranks but they played very few games at this level. The reason for this was they lost three of their key players: Gilsenan, Michael Reilly and Tom Tighe, all from Malahide. The team did not remain senior for very long after that. The team that lined out in the Junior Final was: J. McManus, F. Morris, J. Brady, N. Morton, J. Rafferty, J. Connor, F. Donnelly, T. McLernon, M. Reilly, D. Fitzgerald, P. French, T. Tighe, E. Kealy, M. Gilsenan and J. Fogarty.

St Marnock's' home games were played at different venues during those years:

- A field behind Freaney's house in Old Portmarnock.
- The site of the old St Anne's Church.
- The site of the present St Anne's Church. (By coincidence the newly formed Naomh Mearnóg played many of their early games on the same site.)

Other clubs that St Marnock's would have played against during those years were: Pioneers (Balbriggan), Ballyboughal, St Maur's, Parnells, Wild Geese, Peadar Mackens (Ringsend), St Laurence's (Howth) and many others.

=== Naomh Mearnóg Re-launch ===
At the relaunch of the club, chaired by Mr. Leo Nealon, some members of the Dublin panel including Jimmy Keaveney, David Hickey and Robbie Kelleher were present. The club was not officially registered with the Dublin County Board during that first year. The first year, under the chairmanship of Paddy Doherty, was spent putting the club on a proper footing in terms of organising football and hurling at adult level and putting a juvenile structure in place with the co-operation of St Marnock's National School. In 1975, St Helen's National School did not exist, nor was there a community school in existence.

Having made the initial breakthrough, it was deemed appropriate to have the club affiliated to the County Board. The first proper meeting of the club was held on 29 January 1976 at the North Coast Hotel. Paddy Doherty chaired that meeting with Jackie Hughes acting as secretary and his brother-in-law Éanna Mac Cába acting as treasurer. Records show that that meeting was attended by Frank McNulty, Patsy Haran (later to become Lord Mayor of Portmarnock), Danny McCormick, Vincent Hughes, Mícheál Ó Braonáin, Jim Carroll, Eugene Keaveney, the Hanley brothers, Tom, Pat and Jack, Pat Keaveney (Principal of St Marnock's School), Christy Dwyer, Tony Jordan, Pat Dillon and Robert Kenny as well as the five original founding members. The meeting was also attended by Liam Price of Naomh Maur, who was later to become chairman of the Fingal Football Board. Éanna Mac Cába, as acting Treasurer, reported to the meeting that the club's finances were in a healthy state, showing a credit balance of £27 made up of subscriptions from Jackie Hughes, Brother O’Fearghail (Coláiste Mhuire), Ray Burke T.D. and Shay Corrigan. In the course of his report, the secretary in waiting reported that the visit of the Dublin team to the parish, in 1974, proved very valuable. The meeting decided that a football and hurling team be registered with the County Board under the name St Marnock's.

At this meeting, Patsy Haran commenced his long and distinguished career in football management when he was chosen to manage the club's adult football team. Eugene Keaveney was selected team captain and Pat Dillon was chosen as vice-captain. Robert Kenny was selected as trainer of this team. Selectors on the junior football side were to be Danny McCormick, Jackie Hughes and Vincent Hughes. This first meeting set up a finance committee with the following members: Tom Farrelly, Pat Keaveney, Brendan Shannon, Martin McDonagh and Frank McNulty. A juvenile committee was also set up to organise underage games in the club under the auspices of the following: Frank McNulty, Patsy Haran, Mícheál Ó Braonáin, Pat Keaveney and Christy Dwyer.

On the playing side, two teams were registered at under 11 and under 13 in the Dublin Football League. This historic event took place on 25 February 1976. Just over a month later, on 29 March, an adult hurling team was formed with John Joe Lane selected as team Manager with Danny McCormick and Vincent Hughes as Selectors. Dermot Kennedy was selected as captain with Jim Carroll (he of Camogie fame) as vice-captain. Also, notable players are Oliver Freaney. Oliver came into prominence as a very versatile and solid corner back. At the age of 25 he cooped an award for player of the year for 2018.

In May 1976, Fr. Philips was appointed club president, a position he held until his departure some years later to Ballymun. Two years later, Dublin County Council made two pitches available to the club at Carrickhill, Portmarnock.

=== Modern Naomh Mearnóg ===
Naomh Mearnóg has some of the best facilities available in any GAA club in Ireland, covering almost 32 acres (13 ha). There is a modern clubhouse containing dressing rooms, club bar, function hall, handball alley, gym, catering facilities, meeting rooms and club shop. There are three adult pitches, a flood lit AstroTurf pitch, a juvenile pitch, training areas and a hurling wall. The two county council pitches in Carrickhill are also still in use.

The club made history on 19 September 2009, when the Senior A camogie team won the club's first ever Dublin Senior Championship title, beating Good Counsel 1–10 to 1–8 in the final.

The club grounds were officially named "Páirc Mhearnóg" in 2010 to mark the tenth anniversary since the clubhouse was built.

In 2019 the Adult Men's Football team won promotion to Division 1 of the League.

In 2019 the U21 Hurlers won the U21C Championship.

In 2020 the Adult Men's Hurling Team won the Dublin Intermediate Hurling Championship.

In 2026 the Adult Women's Camogie Team won the Dublin Intermediate 1 Camogie Championship.

== Notable players ==
=== Senior inter-county footballers ===
Dublin

- Kevin O'Brien
- Shane Ryan
- Shane Carthy, until 2025

=== Senior inter-county hurlers ===
Dublin

- Shane Ryan
- Cian Hendricken, who made his first league start in the opening round of the 2018 National Hurling League

=== Senior inter-county ladies' footballers ===
Dublin

- Clíodhna O'Connor

=== others ===
- Ian Garry

== Honours ==
=== Football ===
- Dublin Intermediate Football Championship:
  - 1996, 2024
- Dublin Junior Football Championship:
  - 1936, 2004
- Dublin Under 21 C Football Championship:
  - 2009, 2016
- Dublin AFL Div. 10
  - 2011

=== Hurling ===
- Dublin Senior 3 Hurling Championship:
  - 2023
- Dublin Intermediate Hurling Championship:
  - 2020, 2022
- Dublin Junior Hurling Championship:
  - 1995
- U21 ‘C’ Hurling Championship 2019

=== Camogie ===
- Dublin Senior A Camogie Championship: 1
  - 2009
- Dublin Senior B Camogie Championship: 1
  - 1999
- Dublin Junior B Camogie Championship: 1
  - 2005
- Dublin Junior C Camogie Championship: 1
  - 1990
- Dublin Senior B Camogie League: 1
  - 1999
- Dublin Intermediate Camogie League: 2
  - 2002, 2007, 2026
- Dublin Junior A Camogie League: 1
  - 1991
- Dublin Junior C Camogie League: 1
  - 1990
- Orla Ryan Shield: 2
  - 2005, 2006
- Dublin Intermediate Open Cup: 2
  - 2002, 2007

Sporting positions
Preceded by Ballyboden St Enda's	Dublin Senior Camogie Champions; 2009	Succeeded by –
