= Dublin Intermediate Football Championship =

Annual Gaelic football competition

- Irish: Craobh Idirmheánach Peile; Bhaile Átha Cliath
- Founded: 1946
- Title holders: St Patrick's, Donabate (1st title)
- Most titles: St Brigid's (5 titles)

The Dublin Intermediate Football Championship is an annual Gaelic Athletic Association competition organised by Dublin GAA between second-tier Gaelic football clubs in County Dublin, Ireland.

== Qualification for subsequent competitions ==
=== Leinster Intermediate Club Football Championship ===
The Dublin IFC winner qualifies for the Leinster Intermediate Club Football Championship. It is the only team from Dublin to qualify for this competition. The Dublin IFC winner may enter the Leinster Intermediate Club Football Championship at either the preliminary round or the quarter-final stage. For example, Ballyboughal played in the 2017 Leinster IFC final but lost to the club of Wexford All Star Mattie Forde. This was the first appearance of the Dublin IFC representative at that stage of the competition since 2013, when St Olaf's played in the Leinster IFC final.

2007's winning club, Fingal Ravens, went on to win the Leinster IFC final.

=== All-Ireland Intermediate Club Football Championship ===
The Dublin IFC winner — by winning the Leinster Intermediate Club Football Championship — may qualify for the All-Ireland Intermediate Club Football Championship, at which it would enter at the semi-final stage, providing it hasn't been drawn to face the British champions in the quarter-finals.

=== Dublin Senior Football Championship ===
The winner of the Dublin IFC also qualifies to play in the Dublin Senior Football Championship.

== History ==
In 2018, a second Intermediate Championship was added. The new championship was entitled the Dublin All County Intermediate Football Championship.

The 2018 Dublin Intermediate Championship consisted of 17 teams and did not include any club that also had a team in the senior championship. The all county championship is an intermediate championship that consists of clubs that are also at senior level.

== Top winners ==
#	Team	Wins	Years won
1	St Brigid's	5	1958, 1980, 1992, 2005, 2010
2	St Vincent's	4	1953, 1977, 1991, 2015
3	Garristown	3	1970, 1982, 1999
3	Ballyboughal	3	1968, 1972, 2019
3	Naomh Fionnbarra	3	1966, 2000, 2020
6	Naomh Ólaf	2	1993, 2013
6	St. Maur's	2	1973, 2003
6	Kilmacud Crokes	2	1978, 1987
6	Clann Coláiste Mhuire	2	1983, 1988
6	St Anne's	2	1964, 1985
6	Cuala	2	1981, 2012
6	Skerries Harps	2	1955, 2011
15	O'Tooles	1	1916
15	Ballyboden St Enda's	1	1971
15	Templeogue Synge Street	1	2008
15	Craobh Chiaráin	1	1969
15	Fingal Ravens	1	2007
15	Whitehall Gaels	1	1967
15	Guinness	1	1965
15	Scoil Ui Chonaill	1	1963
15	St Callians	1	1962
15	Rialto Gaels	1	1961
15	Synge St PP	1	1960
15	Inchicore Hibs	1	1959
15	Fingallians	1	1957
15	O'Dwyer's	1	1956
15	Erin's Isle	1	1954
15	Round Towers, Clondalkin	1	1952
15	St Agnes	1	1951
15	Fintan Lawlors	1	1950
15	St Finians (Newcastle)	1	1949
15	Peadar Mackens	1	1948
15	Portrane	1	1947
15	Parish Gaels	1	1946
15	St. Peregrine's	1	2006
15	Garda	1	1986
15	Parnells	1	2004
15	St Mark's	1	2002
15	St Finians (Swords)	1	2001
15	Ballinteer St. Johns	1	1998
15	Raheny	1	1997
15	Naomh Mearnóg	1	1996
15	Lucan Sarsfields	1	1995
15	Trinity Gaels	1	1994
15	Naomh Barróg	1	1990
15	Kilmore	1	1989
15	Innisfails	1	1984
15	Ballymun Kickhams	1	1979
15	St Mary's, Saggart	1	1976
15	St Oliver Plunketts	1	1975
15	St Patrick's, Palmerstown	1	2009
15	St Enda's	1	1974
15	Castleknock	1	2014
15	Na Fianna	1	2017
15	Round Towers Lusk	1	2018
15	St Patrick's, Donabate	1	2021

=== Finals listed by year ===
Year	Winner	Score	Opponent	Score	Notes
2026	Naomh Ólaf	6-09	Ballyboughal	1-20	
2025	Round Towers Lusk	1-22	St Anne's	0-12	
2024	Naomh Mearnóg		Clanna Gael Fontenoy		
2023	Scoil Uí Chonaill				
2022					
2021	St Patrick's, Donabate	2-13	Round Towers, Clondalkin	1-15	
2020	Naomh Fionnbarra	3-10	Naomh Barróg	2-11	
2019	Ballyboughal	1-11	Trinity Gaels	1-10	
2018	Round Towers Lusk	1-18	Naomh Barróg	0-15	
2017	Na Fianna	2-13	St Jude's	1-11	
2016	Fingallians	2-16	Ballymun Kickhams	2-07	
2015	St Vincent's	1-12	St Patrick's, Donabate	1-06	
2014	Castleknock	1-10	Fingallians	1-07	
2013	Naomh Ólaf	1-13	Fingallians	0-12	
2012	Cuala	1-15	Fingallians	1-11	
2011	Skerries Harps	1-11	Cuala	1-10	
2010	St Brigid's	1-14	Cuala	0-09	
2009	St Patrick's, Palmerstown	1-08	Naomh Barróg	1-03	
2008	Templeogue Synge Street	2-07	Kilmacud Crokes	0-10	
2007	Fingal Ravens	0-07	St Brigid's	0-06	
2006	St. Peregrine's		St Margaret's		
2005	St Brigid's	0-11	St Jude's	0-04	
2004	Parnells				
2003	St. Maur's	1-06	Parnells	0-08	
2002	St Mark's				
2001	St Finian's, Swords	5-10	O'Dwyers	0-11	
2000	Naomh Fionnbarra		Good Counsel		
1999	Garristown	0-14	Craobh Chiaráin	0-12	
1998	Ballinteer St. Johns		Naomh Fionnbarra		
1997	Raheny		Naomh Fionnbarra		
1996	Naomh Mearnóg		Erin's Isle		
1995	Lucan Sarsfields		St Vincent's		
1994	Trinity Gaels		St Kevin's		
1993	Naomh Ólaf				
1992	St Brigid's				
1991	St Vincent's		St Brigid's		
1990	Naomh Barróg		St. Maur's		
1989	Kilmore		St. Monica's		
1988	Clann Colaiste Mhuire	(1-10) 0-10 Replay	Kilmore	(2-7) 1-4	
1987	Kilmacud Crokes		An Caislean		
1986	Garda				
1985	St Anne's	0-11	Craobh Chiaráin	1-06	
1984	Innisfails		St Anne's		
1983	Clann Colaiste Mhuire		Craobh Chiaráin (replay)		
1982	Garristown				
1981	Cuala		Man o' War		
1980	St Brigid's		St Brendan's		
1979	Ballymun Kickhams				
1978	Kilmacud Crokes	3-10	Lucan Sarsfields	0-11	
1977	St Vincent's				
1976	St Mary's				
1975	St Oliver Plunketts				
1974	St Enda's (Crumlin)	0-11	St Brendan's	0-07 (replay)	
1973	St Maur's		St Brigid's	(replay)	
1972	Ballyboughal		St Brendan's		
1971	Ballyboden St Enda's				
1970	Garristown				
1969	Craobh Chiaráin				
1968	Ballyboughal		St Sylvester's		
1967	Whitehall Gaels				
1966	Naomh Fionnbarra		Clanna Gael		
1965	Guinness				
1964	St Anne's				
1963	Scoil Ui Chonaill				
1962	St Callians				
1961	Rialto Gaels				
1960	Synge St PP				
1959	Inchicore Hibs				
1958	St Brigid's				
1957	Fingallians				
1956	O'Dwyer's				
1955	Skerries Harps				
1954	Erin's Isle				
1953	St Vincent's		St Enda's, Crumlin		
1952	Round Towers, Clondalkin				
1951	St Agnes		Round Towers, Clondalkin		
1950	Fintan Lawlors		Round Towers, Clondalkin		
1949	St Finian's (Newcastle)				
1948	Peadar Macken's		Round Towers, Clondalkin		
1947	Portrane				
1946	Parish Gaels				
1945					
1944					
1943					
1942					
1941					
1940					
1939					
1938					
1937					
1936					
1935					
1934	St Mary's		Pioneers		
1933					
1932					
1931					
1930	St Lawrence's				
1929	Dolphins				
1928	St Joseph's				
1927	Parnells				
1926					
1925					
1924					
1923					
1922					
1921					
1920	Dún Laoghaire Commercials				
1919					
1918	St Mary's				
1917	Henry Joy McCrackens				
1916	O'Tooles				Match played in 1917 due to number of players interned due the Easter Rising

== All County Championship ==
The Dublin All County Intermediate Football Championship which began in 2018, is a championship consisting of 12 clubs that have teams in the senior championship but also have a side that is at an intermediate level. The winners of this championship do not progress to the senior championship as they already have a team at that level. The championship begins with four groups of three teams in a league format. The top two teams in the leagues progress to the knockout stage and opposition is decided through an open draw. The teams that finish at the bottom of each league must compete in a series of games to prevent relegation to the Dublin Junior Football Championship 1 (all county).

=== Final ===
2026	Na Fianna	1-14 - 1-12	Cuala	O'Toole Park

2025	Ballyboden St Enda's	0-15 - 0-13	Na Fianna	O'Toole Park

2024	Na Fianna	0-13 - 1-6	Kilmacud Crokes	O'Toole Park

2023	Ballyboden St Enda's	2-8 - 0-7	Na Fianna	O'Toole Park

2022	Ballyboden St Enda's	1-14 - 1-11	Na Fianna	O'Toole Park

2021	Na Fianna	1-14 - 0-14	Cuala

2019	Kilmacud Crokes	1-10 - 0-07	Ballyboden St Enda's

2018	Round Towers, Lusk	1-18 - 0-15	Naomh Barróg	Parnell Park
