= St Finian's GAA =

St Finian's GAA may refer to:

- St Finian's GAA (Newcastle), a sports club in south-west Dublin, Ireland
- St Finian's GAA (Swords), a sports club in the River Valley area of north Dublin, Ireland
