= Dublin Intermediate Hurling Championship =

Hurling competition in Ireland

- Irish: Craobh Idirmheánach Iomáint Átha Cliath
- Code: Hurling
- Region: Dublin (GAA)
- Trophy: Harry Boland Cup
- No. of teams: 8
- Title holders: O’Tooles (2026) (4th title)
- Most titles: St. Vincents (9 titles)
- Sponsors: PTSB
- Official website: Dublin GAA

The Dublin Intermediate Hurling Championship (Irish: Craobh Idirmheánach Iomáint Átha Cliath) (branded as the PTSB Dublin Intermediate Hurling Championship) is an annual hurling competition organised by the Dublin County Board of the Gaelic Athletic Association and contested by the intermediate hurling clubs in the county of Dublin. The finalists of this Championship qualify for the Dublin Premier Intermediate Hurling Championship the following season, with the winners receiving the Harry Boland Cup. In the 2026 final, O’Tooles defeated St. Vincents on a scoreline of 3-20 to 2-18 (AET) in O'Toole Park.

== Format ==
The Dublin Hurling Championships were restructured in 2025, with an eight team Intermediate Hurling Championship formed.

=== Group stage ===
The championship consists of 8 teams. Each team plays one another once (7 matches in total). Matches are played at the participating clubs grounds, resulting in either 3 or 4 home games for each club. Two points are awarded for a win, one for a draw and zero for a loss. The teams are ranked in the group stage table by points gained, then scoring difference and then their head-to-head record.

=== Knockout stage ===
The top four teams qualify for the promotion semi-finals, the bottom four teams enter the relegation semi-finals. There must be a winner on the day for each knockout fixture, extra-time and penalties will be used if necessary.

Relegation Semi-finals:

The bottom four teams enter this stage. The higher ranked team receives home advantage.

- 5th v 8th
- 6th v 7th

The two losers are relegated to the Dublin Junior Hurling Championship.

Semi-finals:

The top four teams enter this stage. The higher ranked team receives home advantage.

- 1st v 4th
- 2nd v 3rd

The two winners advance to the final and are promoted to the Dublin Premier Intermediate Hurling Championship.

Final: The two semi-final winners contest the final in a neutral ground. There must be a winner on the day (extra-time and penalties if necessary). The winning team are declared champions.

== Teams ==
=== 2025 Teams ===
The 10 teams competing in the 2025 Dublin Intermediate Hurling Championship are:

Team	Location	Division	Colours	In championship since	Championship titles	Last championship title
Crumlin	Crumlin	Dublin City	Royal blue and white	2025	0	—
Cuala	Dalkey	Dún Laoghaire–Rathdown	Red and white	2025	2	2018
Good Counsel-Liffey Gaels	Drimnagh-Ballyfermot	Dublin City	White and black	2024	1 (as Good Counsel)	1966
Kilmacud Crokes	Stillorgan	Dún Laoghaire–Rathdown	Purple and yellow	?	2	2011
Lucan Sarsfields	Lucan	South Dublin	White and green	?	1	1999
O'Tooles	Ayrfield	Dublin City	Green and white	2025	2	1961
Round Towers	Lusk	Fingal	Blue and white	?	3	2019
Scoil Uí Chonaill	North Richmond Street	Dublin City	Royal blue, maroon and amber	2024	3	1980
St Maur's	Rush	Fingal	Maroon and gold	?	0	—
St Peregrine's	Clonsilla	Fingal	Black and white	2025	0	—

== Roll of Honour ==
=== By club ===
#	Team	Titles	Championships won
1	St Vincent's	9	1953, 1981, 1984, 1988, 1998, 2000, 2003, 2008, 2014
2	O'Tooles	4	1917, 1956, 1961, 2026
2	Kevin's	4	1924, 1979, 2002, 2010
3	Scoil Ui Chonaill	3	1959, 1968, 1980
3	Civil Service	3	1949, 1962, 1986
3	Commercials	3	1964, 1977, 1991
3	Ballyboden St Enda's	3	1974, 1996, 1997
3	Naomh Fionbarra	3	1969, 1983, 2009
3	Round Towers	3	1989, 2006, 2019
9	Young Irelands	2	1950, 1951
9	St Columba's	2	1954, 1957
9	Colmcille	2	1967, 1971
9	St Oliver Plunkett's	2	1978, 1985
9	St Brigid's	2	1975, 1990
9	Craobh Chiaráin	2	1965, 1992
9	Eoghan Ruadhs	2	1955, 1994
9	Trinity Gaels	2	1995, 2001
9	St Mark's	2	1993, 2005
9	Raheny	2	1970, 2007
9	Kilmacud Crokes	2	1982, 2011
9	Cuala	2	1976, 2018
9	Naomh Mearnóg	2	2020, 2022
9	Fingallians	2	2021, 2023
24	Con Colberts	1	1934
24	St Dymphna's	1	1952
24	Na Fianna	1	1958
24	Mondearg	1	1960
24	Crokes	1	1963
24	Good Counsel	1	1966
24	St Brendan's	1	1972
24	Ss. Michael & James	1	1973
24	Faughs	1	1987
24	Lucan Sarsfields	1	1999
24	St Patrick's, Palmerstown	1	2004
24	St Sylvester's	1	2012
24	Setanta	1	2013
24	Castleknock	1	2015
24	St Jude's	1	2016
24	Thomas Davis	1	2017

== List of finals ==
=== List of Dublin IHC finals ===
Year	Winners		Runners-up		Notes	
Year	Club	Score	Club	Score	Venue	Top Scorer
2026	O’Tooles	3-20	St. Vincents	2-18	O'Toole Park	Conn Rock - O’Tooles (1-12)
2025	Lucan Sarsfields	0-22	Scoil Ui Chonaill	0-13	Parnell Park	Joey Dunne - Lucan (0-09)
2024	Commercials	1–19	Naomh Ólaf	2–13	Parnell Park	Diarmuid Ó Dúlaing - Commercials (0-10)
2023	Fingallians	4–17	St Vincent's	3–10	Parnell Park	Seán Hickey - Fingallians (2-05)
2022	Naomh Mearnóg	1-20	St Sylvester's	1–17		
2021	Fingallians	1-20	Erin's Isle	0–10		
2020	Naomh Mearnóg	1–11	Fingallians	1–10	Parnell Park	Liam Mullins - Mearnóg (0-06)
2019	Round Towers	0–13	Clontarf	1-09		
2018	Cuala	2–16	St Mark's	2–10		
2017	Thomas Davis	0–10	Na Fianna	1-06	Parnell Park	Kevin Ward - TD & Aaron Jesson - NAF (0-05)
2016	St Jude's	1–17	Raheny	2–13	St. Peregrine's	Colm O’Callaghan - Jude’s (1-07)
2015	Castleknock	0–15	Naomh Mearnóg	0-09		
2014	St Vincent's	1–15	St Peregrines	2-09		
2013	Setanta		Whitehall Colmcille			
2012	St Sylvester's	2–11	Round Towers	1–10		
2011	Kilmacud Crokes	4–10	Naomh Barróg	1-09		
2010	Kevin's		Thomas Davis			
2009	Naomh Fionbarra	2–10	Round Towers	2-08		
2008	St Vincent's	1–13	Trinity Gaels	0–13		
2007	Raheny	0–16	Ballyboden St Enda's	0–12		
2006	Round Towers	2–10	Thomas Davis	2-07		
2005	St Mark's					
2004	St Patrick's, Palmerstown	0–13	Naomh Ólaf	1-09		
2003	St Vincent's					
2002	Kevin's					
2001	Trinity Gaels		Craobh Chiaráin			
2000	St Vincent's					
1999	Lucan Sarsfields					
1998	St Vincent's					
1997	Ballyboden St Enda's					
1996	Ballyboden St Enda's					
1995	Trinity Gaels					
1994	Eoghan Ruadhs					
1993	St Mark's		Round Towers			
1992	Craobh Chiaráin					
1991	Commercials		Ballyboden St Enda's			
1990	St Brigid's		Commercials			
1989	Round Towers	1 - 12	St Brigid's	2 - 07		
1988	St Vincent's					
1987	Faughs					
1986	Civil Service					
1985	St Oliver Plunkett's					
1984	St Vincent's					
1983	Naomh Fionbarra					
1982	Kilmacud Crokes					
1981	St Vincent's					
1980	Scoil Ui Chonaill					
1979	Kevin's					
1978	St Oliver Plunkett's					
1977	Commercials		Erin's Isle			
1976	Cuala		Erin's Isle			
1975	St Brigid's					
1974	Ballyboden St Enda's					
1973	Ss. Michael & James					
1972	St Brendan's		Ss. Michael & James			
1971	Colmcille					
1970	Raheny					
1969	Naomh Fionbarra		Kickhams			
1968	Scoil Ui Chonaill		Dalkey Mitchell's			
1967	Colmcille					
1966	Good Counsel		O'Tooles			
1965	Craobh Chiaráin					
1964	Commercials					
1963	Crokes					
1962	Civil Service					
1961	O'Tooles					
1960	Mondearg					
1959	Scoil Ui Chonaill					
1958	Na Fianna					
1957	St Columba's					
1956	O'Tooles					
1955	Eoghan Ruadh					
1954	St Columba's					
1953	St Vincent's					
1952	St Dymphna's					
1951	Young Irelands					
1950	Young Irelands					
1949	Civil Service					
1948						
1947						
1946						
1945						
1944						
1943						
1942						
1941						
1940						
1939						
1938						
1937						
1936						
1935						
1934	Con Colberts		Round Towers Lusk			
1933						
1932						
1931						
1930						
1929						
1928						
1927						
1926						
1925						
1924	Kevin's					
1917	O’Tooles	7-02	Clann Uí Neills	0-01		

== See also ==
- Dublin Senior A Hurling Championship (Tier 1)
- Dublin Senior B Hurling Championship (Tier 2)
- Dublin Premier Intermediate Hurling Championship (Tier 3)
- Dublin Junior A Hurling Championship (Tier 5)
