= 2018 Dublin Senior Hurling Championship =

Annual hurling competition season

- 2018 Craobh Sinsear Peile; Bhaile Átha Cliath

Tournament details
- County: Dublin
- Year: 2018

Winners
- Champions: Ballyboden St Enda’s
- Manager: Joe Fortune
- Captain: Simon Lambert

The 2018 Dublin Senior Hurling Championship was the 131st staging of the Dublin Senior Hurling Championship since its establishment by the Dublin County Board in 1887. The championship began on 5 April 2018 and ended on 28 October 2018.

Cuala were the defending champions, defeating Kilmacud Crokes in the 2017 final and winning their third Dublin Senior Hurling Championship in a row.

== Group stage ==
=== Group 1 ===
Team	Pld	W	L	D	PF	PA	PD	Pts
St. Vincents	3	3	0	0	64	38	+26	6
St. Jude's	3	2	1	0	56	39	+17	4
O'Toole's	3	1	2	0	50	63	-13	2
Raheny	3	0	3	0	39	69	-20	0

7 April 2018 Round 1	St. Vincents	3-13 (22) – (10) 0-10	Raheny	Parnell Park
16:00
	Gls: Cian McBride 2-1, Conor Burke 0-5 (0-4f), Rian McBride 0-3, Tomas McGrane 1-0, Sean McCaw, Brian Bolger, Alan Moore, Keith Connolly 0-1 each	av av	Gls: Eoghan Smyth 0-6 (0-5f), Sean Dempsey 0-2, Michael Grenham and Ger Coady 0-1 each	Referee: Finbar Gaffney (Na Fianna)

7 April 2018 Round 1	St. Jude's	0-20 (20) – (11) 0-11	O'Toole's	O'Toole Park
16:00
	Gls: Fionn Ó Riain Broin 0-7 (0-1f), Danny Sutcliffe 0-4, Mark Maguire 0-3, Donal Fox (0-1f, 1 '65) and Joe McManus (0-1f) 0-2 each, Tom Devlin and Ronan Joyce 0-1 each		Gls: Conor Carton 0-7f, Eoin Darcy and Andrew Morris (0-1f) 0-2 each	Referee: Jason Buckley (Setanta)

19 April 2018 Round 2	O'Toole's	2-18 (24) – (17) 0-17	Raheny	Parnell Park
20:15
	Gls: Conor Carton (0-6f) and Andrew Morris (0-3f) 0-7 each, Cian Wilson and Christy Mulligan 1-1 each, Peadar Carton 0-2		Gls: Eoghan Smyth 0-13 (0-11f), Ben McHugh, Sean Dempsey, Jack Lyons, Shane Bell 0-1 each	Referee: Dave Aston (Naomh Mearnóg)

21 April 2018 Round 2	St. Vincents	1-13 (16) – (13) 0-13	St. Jude's	Parnell Park
17:45
				Referee: Danny Harrington

8 September 2018 Round 3	St. Vincents	1-23 (26) – (18) 1-15	O'Toole's	Parnell Park
17:30
				Referee: Chris Mooney

8 September 2018 Round 3	Raheny	0-12 (12) – (23) 1-20	St. Jude's	O'Toole Park
17:30

=== Group 2 ===
Team	Pld	W	L	D	PF	PA	PD	Pts
Kilmacud Crokes	3	3	0	0	70	42	+28	6
Na Fianna	3	2	1	0	83	55	+28	4
Whitehall Colmcille	3	1	2	0	68	77	-9	2
Naomh Fionnbarra	3	0	3	0	44	91	-47	0

5 April 2018 Round 1	Na Fianna	1-28 (31) – (20) 0-20	Whitehall Colmcille	Parnell Park
18:45
	Gls: Eoghan McHugh 0-7, Donal Burke 0-6 (0-2f), Colin Currie 0-5 (0-3f), Peter Feeney 1-0, Feargal Breathnach and Sean Murphy 0-3 each, Paul O'Dea, Gavin King, Seán Ryan, Seamie O'Sullivan 0-1 each	av av lv	Gls: Sean Gray 0-8 (0-4f), Daire Gray 0-4, Niall O'Connor, Cathal Ryan, Paddy Spellacy, Cormac Costello 0-2 each	Referee: Thomas Gleeson (Naomh Fionnbarra)

5 April 2018 Round 1	Kilmacud Crokes	0-24 (24) – (9) 1-6	Naomh Fionnbarra	Parnell Park
20:15
	Gls: Mark Howard 0-8 (0-7f), Fergal Whitely 0-5, Oisín O'Rorke 0-3, Lorcan McMullan, Caolan Conway, Barry O'Rorke 0-2 each, Damien Kelly and Ronan Hayes 0-1	Report av av	Gls: Ryan Curley 0-4 (0-3f), Dylan Owens 1-0, Jay Roe and Ger Dodrill 0-1 each	Referee: Finbar Gaffney (Na Fianna)

19 April 2018 Round 2	Na Fianna	3-26 (35) – (15) 2-9	Naomh Fionnbarra	Parnell Park
18:45
	Gls: Colin Currie 1-8 (0-4f, 1 '65), Andrew Jamieson-Murphy 0-5, Ciaran Heeney and Seán Ryan 1-1 each, Gavin King 0-3 (1 sl), Joey Boland, Eoghan McHugh, Donal Burke 0-2 each, Sean Murphy and Seamie O'Sullivan 0-1 each		Gls: Dylan Curley 1-1, Ryan Curley 0-4 (0-3f), Glenn Dodrill 1-0, Ger Dodrill 0-2, Gary McCauley and Anthony Costello 0-1 each	Referee: Damien Burnett (Craobh Chiaráin)

20 April 2018 Round 2	Kilmacud Crokes	2-20 (26) – (16) 0-16	Whitehall Colmcille	O'Toole Park
18:45
	Gls: Mark Howard 1-11 (0-7f), Ronan Hayes 1-0, Caolan Conway, Fergal Whitely, Oisín O'Rorke 0-2 each, Lorcan McMullan, Damien Kelly, Barry O'Rorke 0-1 each		Gls: Sean Gray 0-12 (0-8f, 2 '65), Niall O'Connor, Paddy Spellacy, Cathal Ryan, Sean Power 0-1 each	Referee: Gerard Delaney (Faughs)

7 September 2018 Round 3	Whitehall Colmcille	4-20 (32) – (20) 2-14	Naomh Fionnbarra	Parnell Park
18:45
				Referee: PJ Murray

7 September 2018 Round 3	Kilmacud Crokes	0-20 (20) – (17) 1-14	Na Fianna	Parnell Park
20:15
				Referee: Seán Stack

=== Group 3 ===
Team	Pld	W	L	D	PF	PA	PD	Pts
Ballyboden St. Enda's	3	3	0	0	68	42	+26	6
Cuala	3	2	1	0	49	25	+4	4
Craobh Chiaráin	3	1	2	0	50	58	-8	2
St. Brigid's	3	0	3	0	43	65	-22	0

7 April 2018 Round 1	Cuala	1-14 (17) – (10) 1-7	St. Brigid's	Parnell Park
17:45
	Gls: David Treacy 0-9 (0-7f, 1 '65), Brian Fitzgerald 1-0, Sean Moran (0-1f), Darragh O'Connell, Colm Cronin, Jake Malone, Con O'Callaghan 0-1 each		Gls: Johnny McGuirk 0-5 (0-3f), Derry Murphy 1-0, Donncha Ryan 0-2	Referee: Sean Stack (Parnells)

17 April 2018 Round 1	Ballyboden St. Enda's	1-19 (22) – (13) 2-7	Craobh Chiaráin	O'Toole Park
19:45
	Gls: Paul Ryan 0-12 (0-6f, 1 '65), Conal Keaney 0-3, Conor McCormack 1-0, Simon Lambert, Finn McGarry, Paul Doherty, David O'Connor 0-1 each	av av	Gls: Kevin Warren 1-2, Alan McCrabbe 0-4 (0-3f, 1 '65) Cian Derwin 1-1	Referee: Chris Mooney (St Pat's Palmerstown)

21 April 2018 Round 2	Cuala	1-15 (18) – (14) 0-14	Craobh Chiaráin	Parnell Park
16:00
				Referee: Chris Mooney

22 April 2018 Round 2	Ballyboden St. Enda's	2-19 (25) – (15) 1-12	St. Brigid's	O'Toole Park
11:00
				Referee: Tony Lambe

5 September 2018 Round 3	St. Brigid's	2-12 (18) – (23) 3-14	Craobh Chiaráin	Parnell Park
18:45
				Referee: Thomas Gleeson

5 September 2018 Round 3	Cuala	0-14 (14) – (21) 1-18	Ballyboden St. Enda's	Parnell Park
20:15
				Referee: Seán McCarthy

=== Group 4 ===
Team	Pld	W	L	D	PF	PA	PD	Pts
Lucan Sarsfields	3	3	0	0	68	46	+22	6
Ballinteer St. John's	3	1	1	1	53	60	-7	3
Setanta	3	1	2	0	57	54	+3	2
Crumlin	3	0	2	1	56	74	-18	1

8 April 2018; 14:15; Round 1	Lucan Sarsfields	1-25 - 1-12	Crumlin	O'Toole Park; Referee: Tony Lambe (St Vincent's)
8 April 2018; 14:15; Round 1	Ben Coffey 1-4, Ciaran Dowling 0-6 (0-1f), Matt McCaffrey and Peter Kelly 0-4 each, Chris Crummey, Seán McClelland, Kevin Fitzgerald 0-2 each, Aidan Roche 0-1		Adam McGreal 1-4 (1-0 pen, 0-3f, 1 '65), Shane Ryan 0-3, Lee Coleman 0-2, Conor Foley, Ben Quinn, Kevin Byrne 0-1 each	O'Toole Park; Referee: Tony Lambe (St Vincent's)

8 April 2018; 16:00; Round 1	Ballinteer St. John's	0-17 - 1-13	Setanta	O'Toole Park; Referee: Peter Smyth (O'Tooles)
8 April 2018; 16:00; Round 1	Danny McCarthy 0-7 (0-6f, 1 '65), Aodhán Clabby 0-4 (0-1f, 1 sl), Eoin Coffey, Glenn Whelan, Tom Aherne 0-2 each		Ryan Clarke 0-7 (0-4f), Fiontán McGibb 1-2, Dara De Búrca 0-2, Nathan Whelan and Seán Ó Riain 0-1 each	O'Toole Park; Referee: Peter Smyth (O'Tooles)

21 April 2018; 16:00; Round 2	Lucan Sarsfields	0-23 - 1-12	Ballinteer St. John's	O'Toole Park; Referee: PJ Murray

21 April 2018; 17:45; Round 2	Setanta	3-16 - 2-14	Crumlin	O'Toole Park; Referee: Donal Ryan

8 September 2018; 16:00; Round 3	Lucan Sarsfields	0-17 - 0-16	Setanta	O'Toole Park; Referee: Paul Faughnan

8 September 2018; 16:00; Round 3	Crumlin	3-12 - 1-18	Ballinteer St. John's	Parnell Park; Referee: Peter Smyth

== Quarter-finals ==
21 September 2018; 18:45; Quarter-Final 1	St Vincents	1-14 - 1-12	Na Fianna	Parnell Park; Referee: Dave Aston

21 September 2018; 20:15; Quarter-Final 2	Ballyboden St. Enda's	3-21 - 0-18	Ballinteer St John's	Parnell Park; Referee: Jason Buckley

23 September 2018; 14:15; Quarter-Final 3	Kilmacud Crokes	0-19 - 0-14	St Jude's	Parnell Park; Referee: PJ Murray

23 September 2018; 16:00; Quarter-Final 4	Lucan Sarsfields	2-13 - 2-26	Cuala	Parnell Park; Referee: Sean Stack

== Semi-finals ==
7 October 2018; 14:15; Semi Final l	St Vincents	0-18 - 2-16	Ballyboden St. Enda's	Parnell Park; Referee: Thomas Gleeson (Naomh Fionnbarra)
7 October 2018; 14:15; Semi Final l	J Hetherton 0-11 (0-9f, 0-1 ‘65’), R McBride 0-3, T Connolly, A Moore, C McBride, C Burke 0-1 each		P Ryan 0-8 (0-7f, 0-1 ‘65’), A Mellett 1-3, P Doherty 1-2, N McMorrow 0-2, S Durkin 0-1	Parnell Park; Referee: Thomas Gleeson (Naomh Fionnbarra)

7 October 2018; 16:00; Semi Final 2	Kilmacud Crokes	3-13 - 1-17	Cuala	Parnell Park; Referee: J Buckley (Setanta)
7 October 2018; 16:00; Semi Final 2	M Howard 0-6 (0-6f), O O’Rorke 1-1, L McMullan 0-3, D Kelly, R Hayes 1-0 each, C Conway 0-2, S McGrath 0-1.		D Treacy 0-11 (0-9f), Con O’Callaghan 0-4, S Moran 1-0 (1-0 pen), C Cronin, D Ó Floinn 0-1 each.	Parnell Park; Referee: J Buckley (Setanta)

== Final ==
21 October 2018; 16:00; Final	Ballyboden St. Enda's	2-17 - 1-20	Kilmacud Crokes	Parnell Park; Referee: Chris Mooney
21 October 2018; 16:00; Final	P Ryan 0-11 (0-7f, 0-1 ‘65’, 0-1 sl), G Maguire (1-0f), A Mellett 1-0 each, C Dooley 0-2, C Keaney, N Ryan, D Curtin, N McMorrow 0-1 each.		M Howard 0-11 (10f), S McGrath 1-1, C Conway 0-2, L McMullan, F Whitely, C Mac Gabhann, S Veale, R O’Carroll, O O’Rorke 0-1 each.	Parnell Park; Referee: Chris Mooney

28 October 2018; 15:30; Final replay	Ballyboden St. Enda's	v	Kilmacud Crokes	Parnell Park; Referee: Jason Buckley
