= Park Rangers GAA =

Gaelic games club in Dublin, Ireland

Park Rangers
- Founded: 1966
- County: Dublin
- Colours: Green and Gold
- Grounds: Phoenix Park

Park Rangers were a Gaelic Athletic Association (GAA) club and Ladies Gaelic Football Association (LGFA) club based in the Phoenix Park, Dublin.

They were one of the few clubs in Dublin with no juvenile section and had a single junior Football team.

The club was founded in 1966 and the colours were green and gold. Players from the club An Riocht which disbanded in the early 1970s moved to the club while others moved to Clanna Gael/Fontenoy. A Riocht itself was founded in the 1950s following the disbandment of the Peadar Mackens club. The club won its first championship, the Dublin Junior Football Championship E in 2008. Their only previous appearance in a championship final was in 1977.

Park Rangers were instrumental in founding the Dublin Ladies Football County Board in the mid 1980s and had much success in the early decade of the Ladies competitions under the new County board's administration, and were runners up in the Dublin Senior Ladies Championship in 1991. The ladies' section of Park Rangers disbanded in 1992, and most players transferred to Marino.

Due to poor numbers the club merged with Liffey Gaels for the 2012 season.

== Honours ==
- Dublin Junior Football Championship: runners-up 1977
- Junior E Football Championship winners 2008
- Dublin AFL Division 9 runners-up 2010
- Duffy Cup 2001
