= Dublin Premier Intermediate Hurling Championship =

Annual hurling competition for intermediate clubs in Dublin

- Irish: Craobh Príomh-Idirmheánach Iomáint Átha Cliath
- Code: Hurling
- Founded: 2025; 1 year ago
- Region: Dublin (GAA)
- No. of teams: 8
- Title holders: Fingallians (2026) (1st title)
- Most titles: Commercials ; Fingallians (1 titles)
- Sponsors: PTSB
- Official website: Dublin GAA

The Dublin Premier Intermediate Hurling Championship (Dublin PIHC) (Irish: Craobh Príomh-Idirmheánach Iomáint Átha Cliath) (branded as the PTSB Dublin Premier Intermediate Hurling Championship) is an annual hurling competition organised by the Dublin County Board of the Gaelic Athletic Association and contested by the top-ranking intermediate clubs in the county of Dublin in Ireland. It is the third tier championship in Dublin Adult Hurling and was introduced in 2025. The finalists of the Dublin Premier Intermediate Championship, gain automatic promotion to the Dublin Senior 2 Championship. The winner qualifies for the subsequent Leinster Club Championship. Fingalians are the title holders after defeating Lucan Sarsfields by 0–23 to 1–13 in the 2026 final.

== History ==
The Dublin Intermediate Hurling Championship was established in 1924 in an effort to provide a meaningful competition for clubs and also to bridge the standard of play between the Dublin Senior Hurling Championship and the Dublin Junior Hurling Championship. As the number of club teams increased, the need for more appropriate championships also increased. By 2024, the Dublin hurling system featured three senior championships, one intermediate championship and one junior championship.

In February 2025, the Dublin County Committee ratified a new structure for all adult hurling championships. The new structure resulted in the abolition of the Dublin Senior 3 Hurling Championship and the creation of a new Dublin Premier Intermediate Hurling Championship. This new competition consisted of the bottom six teams from SHC 3 in 2024, as well as the winner and runner-up from the 2024 IHC.

The eight teams in the inaugural championship were: Commercials, Cuala, Naomh Fionnbarra, Naomh Ólaf, O'Tooles, Setanta, St Sylvester's and St Vincent's. The very first matches took place on 12 July 2025. Commercials went on to win the very first championship after a 1–22 to 0–13 win over St Sylvester's in the 2025 final.

== Format ==
=== Group stage ===
The eight teams form one single group. Over the course of the group stage, each team plays once against the others in the group, resulting in each team being guaranteed seven games. Two points are awarded for a win, one for a draw and zero for a loss. The teams are ranked in the group stage table by points gained, then scoring difference and then their head-to-head record. The top four teams in the group qualify for the knockout stage.

=== Knockout stage ===
The top four teams qualify for the promotion semi-finals, the bottom four teams enter the relegation semi-finals. There must be a winner on the day for each knockout fixture, extra-time and penalties will be used if necessary.

Relegation Semi-finals:

The bottom four teams enter this stage. The higher ranked team receives home advantage.

- 5th v 8th
- 6th v 7th

The two losers are relegated to the Dublin Intermediate Hurling Championship.

Semi-finals:

The top four teams enter this stage. The higher ranked team receives home advantage.

- 1st v 4th
- 2nd v 3rd

The two winners advance to the final and are promoted to the Dublin Senior 2 Hurling Championship.

Final: The two semi-final winners contest the final in a neutral ground. There must be a winner on the day (extra-time and penalties if necessary). The winning team are declared champions.

=== Promotion and relegation ===
The winners qualify for the Leinster Intermediate Club Hurling Championship.

== Roll of Honour ==
=== By club ===
#	Team	Titles	Championships won
1	Commercials	1	2025
1	Fingallians	1	2026

== List of finals ==
Year	Winners		Runners-up		Venue	Top Scorer	#
Year	Club	Score	Club	Score	Venue	Top Scorer	#
2026	Fingalians	0-23	Lucan Sarsfields	1-13	Parnell Park	Eoin O’Connor - Fingallians (0-08)	
2025	Commercials	1-22	St Sylvester's	0–13	Parnell Park	Diarmaid Ó Dúlaing - Commercials (1-14)	

== 2027 Teams ==
The 8 teams competing in the 2027 Dublin Premier Intermediate Hurling Championship are:

Colour	Team	Location
	Kilmacud Crokes (B)	Stillorgan
	Cuala (B)	Dalkey
	Naomh Olaf	Sandyford
	Setanta	Ballymun
	St. Vincents (B)	Marino
	O'Tooles	Ayrfield
	Thomas Davis	Kiltipper
	Na Fianna (B)	Glasnevin
