= Innisfail =

Innisfail may refer to:

== Australia ==
- Innisfail, Queensland, a town in the Cassowary Coast Region

== Canada ==
- Innisfail, Alberta, town
- Innisfail (provincial electoral district)
- Innisfail (territorial electoral district)

== Ireland ==
- Inisfail, poetic name for Ireland
- Innisfails GAA, Gaelic games club in based in Balgriffin, Fingal

== United States ==
- Innisfails, team which competed in the St. Louis Soccer League from 1907 to 1921

== See also ==
- Innisfil, town in Ontario, Canada
