= Garristown GAA =

Gaelic games club in County Dublin, Ireland

- CLG Baile Gháire
- Founded: 1938
- County: Dublin
- Colours: Sky blue and Navy
- Grounds: Chapel Lane, Garristown, County Dublin

Playing kits
Standard colours

Garristown GAA is a Gaelic Athletic Association club in based in Garristown in the north of County Dublin.

The club fields teams at adult and juvenile level in both women's and men's football.

== Background ==
Garristown, a small local GAA club, was founded in 1938. It has played at John McDonnell Memorial Park since its formation. The club compete in the Dublin GAA Football leagues and Championship in both men's and women's football. The club has some successes in both codes, including Dublin Intermediate Championship wins in 1970, 1982 and 1999, Dublin Junior Championship wins in 1965 and 2022 and Dublin Ladies Championship wins in 2015 and 2017.

The clubs boy's juvenile section are part of the amalgamated St Peters teams with fellow local clubs Ballyboughil and Clann Mhuire. This amalgamation has proved a success, with several St Peters teams playing in the top divisions in Dublin.

== Honours ==
Men's

- Dublin Intermediate Football Championship: (3) 1970, 1982, 1999
- Dublin Junior Football Championship: (2) 1965, 2022
- Dublin AFL Division 5 (1): 2024
- Dublin AFL Division 6 (1): 2023
- Dublin AFL Division 7 (1): 2022
- Dublin AFL Division 8 (1): 2019

Ladies

- Dublin Junior G Ladies Football Championship (1): 2015
