= Shane Ryan (Dublin Gaelic footballer) =

Irish sportsman (born 1978)

Personal information
- Native name: Shane Ó Riaín (Irish)
- Born: 5 October 1978 (age 48) Dublin, Ireland
- Occupation: Primary school teacher
- Height: 1.83 m (6 ft 0 in)

Sport
- Football Position: Midfield
- Hurling Position: Left half-forward
Club
- Years: Club
- Naomh Mearnóg
Inter-county
Years	County	Apps (scores)
1999–2009 1999-2001, 2009–2011	Dublin (F); Dublin (H)	48 (1–16); 4 (0–5)
Inter-county titles
	Football	Hurling
Leinster Titles	6	0
All-Ireland Titles	0	0
League titles	0	1
All-Stars	1	0

Shane Ryan (born 5 October 1978) is an Irish sportsman who plays hurling for the Dublin county team and, formerly, Gaelic football also for the Dublin county team (F), for which he received an All Star. Ryan plays his club hurling and football for Naomh Mearnóg and his preferred position is centre back, although he is known to have played many positions for Dublin. He made his senior debut for Dublin on 4 June 1999. He made the decision to concentrate solely on Gaelic football in 2004, which dealt a blow to the then hurling manager Humphrey Kelleher. In 2009, he made the decision to switch back to hurling and join Anthony Daly's team after giving it much consideration. Ryan is a graduate of Business Studies (2001) in Dublin City University and is a teacher by profession.

Ryan has an illustrious ancestry in the Gaelic Athletic Association as his father, Jack Ryan, won an All-Ireland Senior Hurling Championship medal with Tipperary in 1971. His mother, the late Orla Ní Shíocháin was an inter-county camogie player with Dublin for many years and won three All-Ireland Senior Camogie medals. She also won many Interprovincial Championship medals with Leinster. His paternal grandfather Séamus Ó Riain was President of the Gaelic Athletic Association 1967–70, and his maternal grandfather, Seán Ó Síocháin, was the first Director General of the Association, having served as General Secretary for many years.

== Sporting achievements ==
Ryan was a Leinster Under 21 finalist in 1998 in football and a Leinster Minor and Under 21 finalist in 1996 and 1998 in hurling. He has won six Leinster Senior Football Championship medals with Dublin in 2002, 2005, 2006, 2007, 2008 and 2009. In 2011 Ryan won a National Hurling League medal and was part of the Dublin team that reached the All-Ireland Hurling semi-finals against Tipperary.

In 2006, Ryan won the Sigerson Cup with Dublin City University and was nominated for an All Star award for his performances with Dublin in Midfield. 2006 continued to be a good year for Ryan as Seán Boylan named him on the Compromise Rules squad to play Australia in the first test at Pearse Stadium on 29 October 2006. He then won an All Star award in 2008, when he was named in midfield alongside Tyrone player Enda McGinley. In May 2012, Ryan announced his retirement from the inter-county game due to plagues of injuries.
