= Keith Gorman (Gaelic footballer) =

Irish Gaelic footballer (1979–2025)

Personal information
- Native name: Keith Ó Gormáin (Irish)
- Nickname: Beezer
- Born: 1979 Balbriggan, County Dublin, Ireland
- Died: 27 September 2025 (aged 46) Sandyford, Dublin, Ireland
- Occupation: Pharmaceutical plant worker
- Height: 6 ft 4 in (193 cm)

Sport
- Sport: Gaelic football
- Position: Goalkeeper
Clubs
- Years: Club
- O'Dwyers; Newtown Blues
Club titles
- Dublin titles: 0
Inter-county
- Years: County
- 1998–1999: Dublin
Inter-county titles
- Leinster titles: 0
- All-Irelands: 0
- NFL: 0
- All Stars: 0

Keith Gorman (1979 – 27 September 2025) was an Irish Gaelic footballer. At club level, he played with O'Dwyers in Dublin, Newtown Blues in Louth and at inter-county level as a goalkeeper with the Dublin senior team.

== Career ==
Gorman first played Gaelic football at club level with the O'Dwyers club. He later transferred to the Newtown Blues club in Drogheda. Gorman first appeared on the inter-county scene with Dublin during a two-year tenure with the under-21 team in 1998 and 1999. He later progressed to the senior team and won an O'Byrne Cup medal in 1999. Gorman was sub-goalkeeper for the subsequent National League campaign, which ended with a defeat to Cork in the final.

== Illness and death ==
Gorman was diagnosed with pancreatic cancer in May 2024. He died on 27 September 2025, at the age of 46.

== Honours ==
Dublin

- O'Byrne Cup: 1999
