= Wild Geese GAA =

Gaelic games club in County Dublin, Ireland

- Founded: 1888
- County: Dublin
- Nickname: Geese
- Colours: Black and Amber
- Grounds: Oldtown

Playing kits
Standard colours

Wild Geese (Irish: Na Géanna Fiáine CLG ) are a GAA club based in Oldtown.

== Honours ==
=== Football Roll of Honour ===
- 2014 Promoted to Dublin AFL Div. 7
- 2010 Dublin Junior D Football Championship Runners Up
- 2010 Promoted to Dublin AFL Div. 8
- 2009 Dublin Junior E Football Championship Winners
- 2009 Dublin AFL Div. 10: Runners Up
- 2008 Dublin Junior E Football Championship Runners Up
- 2007, 2009 Sheridan Cup Winners
- 1986 McArdle Cup Winners
- 1931 Feis Cup Winners

=== Hurling Roll of Honour ===
- 2025 Dublin Hurling Minor D Shield Winners
- 2024 Dublin Hurling Junior C Winners
- 2025 Dublin Hurling League Division 6 Winners
- 2018 Dublin Hurling League Division 8 Winners
- 2009 Dublin Hurling League Division 8 Winners
- 2009 Gus Warren Challenge Cup Winners
