= Starlights GAA =

Gaelic Athletic Association club

- CLG Réaltsoilse
- Founded: 1950
- County: Dublin
- Colours: White and black
- Grounds: Santry, Fingal
- Coordinates: 53.418°N 6.259°W

Playing kits
Standard colours

Starlights GAA is a Gaelic Athletic Association club in based in the Collinstown area in Fingal, within the traditional County Dublin. It was founded in 1950.

The club has an adult men's Gaelic football team which in 2016 played in the Dublin AFL Division 9 and won the Dublin Junior "E" Football Championship.

== Honours ==
- Junior E Football Championship (1): 2016
