= St Finian's GAA (Newcastle) =

Gaelic games club in Newcastle, County Dublin, Ireland

- Naomh Finnéin CLG
- Founded: 1943
- County: Dublin
- Colours: Green and red
- Grounds: Aylmer Road, Newcastle-Lyons, Co Dublin

Playing kits
Standard colours

St Finian's GAA is a Gaelic Athletic Association club in based in Newcastle-Lyons, in the west of County Dublin.

The club has adult football and ladies football teams and underage teams at various levels. St Finian's won promotion to the Dublin Intermediate Football Championship in 2018 by defeating Craobh Chiaráin in the Dublin Junior 1 Football Championship final.

== Honours ==
- Dublin Intermediate Football Championship: winner 1949
- Dublin Junior 1 Football Championship: winner 2018
- Dublin Under 21 Football Championship winner 2004 -
