= Croi Ro Naofa GAA =

Gaelic games club in County Dublin, Ireland

Croí Ró-Naofa GAA
- CLG Croí Ró-Naofa
- County: Dublin
- Colours: White & red
- Grounds: Killinarden Park Clubhouse, Killinarden Way, Dublin 24

Playing kits
Standard colours

Croí Ró-Naofa GAA is a Gaelic Athletic Association club in based in the Tallaght, South Dublin.

The club has an adult men's football team which in 2016 played in the Dublin AFL Division 10 and the Dublin Junior "E" Football Championship.

== History ==
The club was formed in 2000 and serves the Killinarden-Jobstown area of Tallaght.

As of 2022, the club fields teams for both boys and girls at U11, U16, and Adult age groups.
In October 2019, the club was left without its home pitch in Killinarden Park for over a year after a car had been driven around the pitch overnight and burnt out on the grounds, destroying the pitch for the 18th time that year.

== Honours ==
- Dublin Junior E Football Championship Winners 2013
- Dublin Adult Ladies Junior B Championship Winners 2019
- Dublin Adult Ladies Div 4 League Winners 2019
