= St James Gaels GAA =

Gaelic games club in County Dublin, Ireland

St James Gaels GAA Club
- Gael Naomh Sheamais CLG
- Founded: 1994
- County: Dublin
- Nickname: Gaels
- Colours: Blue and Yellow
- Grounds: Iveagh Grounds; Drimnagh Castle
- Coordinates: 53°19′47″N 6°18′29″W

Playing kits
Standard colours

St. James Gaels, or Gaeil Naomh Shéamais in Irish, are a Gaelic Athletic Association club located in Dublin, Ireland.

Also sometimes known as St James Gaels / An Caislean, the club was formed in July 1994 as the result of the amalgamation of An Caisleán and Guinness GAA clubs. Both of these clubs had been in existence for several decades, but were struggling due to the increasing age profile within their respective base areas. Rather than allow two clubs to go out of existence, both sets of club officers agreed, following negotiation, to pool resources and to form one club serving Walkinstown and its surrounding areas.

== History ==
An Caisleán's roots can be traced back to a couple of weeks' after Dublin's victory over Derry in the 1958 All-Ireland Senior Football Championship final. A group of church stewards in Walkinstown Church decided, in the aftermath of Dublin's success, that the newly constituted parish needed its own identity and that a parish GAA club was an important part in promoting that identity. CLG Naomh Gearóid (St. Gerard's) was subsequently formed.

In 1966, Naomh Gearóid — wanting to play their games within the boundaries of the parish — entered into an agreement with Drimnagh Castle Secondary School, which was run by the Christian Brothers. In return for changing the club's name to "An Caisleán", they were given use of the school pitches and dressing rooms, becoming the club for the secondary school's past and present pupils. During its 28 years of existence, An Caisleán won a number of leagues and championships at various grades. This included winning the Intermediate Football League in 1987 and being runners-up in the Dublin Intermediate Football Championship in the same year. The junior hurlers also reached the final of the Dublin Junior Hurling Championship in 1979.

Guinness GAA Club's history goes back further than that of An Caisleán. The first club to represent and win in an All-Ireland (1891) for Dublin was a team called Young Irelands. Young Irelands team and officials were all labourers in the Guinness Brewery and in the 1890s they won several All Ireland titles at a time when club champions represented their counties in All Ireland championships. Young Irelands went out of existence in the early years of the 20th century and were replaced in the Guinness brewery by a club called Phoenix GFC. This club had limited success during their lifetime before they, in turn, were replaced in the mid-1940s by Guinness Hurling and Football Club. This club based themselves in the Iveagh Grounds.

Guinness GAA Club, whose membership was confined to families and employees of the brewery and its associated companies, ran into difficulties as a result of the rationalising of the brewery operation during the economic downturn in the late 1980s and early 1990s. This rationalisation reduced the intake of staff members of playing age and forced those running the club to consider winding up their operation or merging with another club.

In 1994, the two clubs (An Caisleán and Guinness GAA club) merged to form St. James Gaels GAA club. A Ladies' Gaelic football team was formed in 2005.

St James Gaels won the Dublin Junior 'B' Football Championship in 2012.

== Notable former players ==
- Pico Lopes
