= Good Counsel-Liffey Gaels =

Gaelic Athletic Association club

Good Counsel/Liffey Gaels
- Deagh Comhairle/Gaeil na Life
- Founded: 2016
- County: Dublin
- Nickname: Counsel Gaels
- Colours: White and Black
- Grounds: Galtymore Road, Drimnagh Castle, Liffey Park

Playing kits
Standard colours

Good Counsel/Liffey Gaels (Irish: Deagh Comhairle/Gaeil na Life) is a Gaelic Athletic Association club based in Drimnagh/Ballyfermot, Dublin, Ireland, formed following a merger between Good Counsel of Drimnagh and Liffey Gaels of Ballyfermot.

== History ==
In March 2016, Liffey Gaels announced that they would be merging with Good Counsel for their upcoming Junior B Hurling Campaign. Over the next few years, other teams from both clubs beginning to merge. Liffey Gaels played their last game on the 17th of November 2018 vs St Vincents in the Minor Football League Division 4. Good Counsel played their last game as Good Counsel in a 4–14 to 0-12 Quarter-final defeat against Lucan Sarsfields in the 2019 Dubin U21 Hurling 'C' Championship on the 19th of November 2019.

== Honours ==
2019:

- Dublin Junior B Hurling Championship Runners-Up
- Dublin Adult Hurling League Div 5 Winners
