= St Mark's GAA =

Gaelic games club in County Dublin, Ireland

St Mark's
- Naomh Marcais
- Founded: 1975
- County: Dublin
- Nickname: Mustangs
- Colours: Amber and Black
- Grounds: McGee Park
- Coordinates: 53°17′07.69″N 6°25′05.35″W

Playing kits
Standard colours

St Mark's is a Gaelic Athletic Association club based in Springfield, Tallaght in South Dublin, Ireland. St Marks won the 2005 Dublin Intermediate A Hurling Championship then went on in 2006 to win the Dublin Senior B Hurling Championship. St Mark's hurlers were promoted to AHL3 in 2018. St Mark's fielded teams at AFL4 in football and AHL3 Hurling in 2019. The hurling team won AHL5 and made it to the Dublin Junior A championship final too in 2017. They also got to the Intermediate Hurling championship Final in 2018, another promotion in AHL4 the same year. The club also caters for Juvenile, Minor and Junior teams in Football, Hurling, Camogie and Ladies Football.

== Notable players ==
- Michael Doyle, later a professional association football player in England
- David O'Callaghan (dual player)
- Declan Bolger (Dublin Midfielder)

== Honours ==
- Dublin Junior Football Championship: Winner 2021
- Dublin Junior 6 All County Football Championship: Winner 2021
- Dublin AHL5 Hurling League: Winner 2016
- Dublin Senior B Hurling Championship: Winner 2006
- Dublin Intermediate Football Championship: Winner 2002
- Dublin AFL Division 11S: Winner 2016, 2009
- Dublin Intermediate Hurling Championship: Winner 1993, 2005
- Dublin Junior E Hurling Championship: Winner 2012
- Dublin Junior F Hurling Championship: Winner 2011
- Dublin U21 FL Div 1: Winner 1994
