= St Finian's GAA (Swords) =

Gaelic games club in Swords, County Dublin, Ireland

- Cumann Naomh Fhionnáin
- Founded: 1983
- County: Dublin
- Colours: Maroon and White
- Grounds: River Valley Park, Swords; Ridgewood Park, Swords; Nevinstown Pitch, Swords
- Coordinates: 53°27′13.13″N 6°14′34.40″W

Playing kits
Standard colours

St Finian's GAA, Camogie and LGFA (Irish: Cumann Naomh Fhionnáin) is a Gaelic Athletic Association club based in the River Valley, Ridgewood, Boroimhe and Forest Road area of Swords in the north of County Dublin. The club was founded on the 22nd July 1983 following the finalisation of development plans for 419 new homes in River Valley.

The club fields teams at adult and juvenile level in Camogie, Hurling, and Ladies' and Men's Gaelic football. Two adult Rounders teams were founded in September 2020.

St Finian's saw the Irish actor Brendan Gleeson play for the team during his twenties. Gleeson played as a full-forward for the club's Gaelic football team, where he was selected as a member of the club’s "Team of the Decade".

== Name Origin ==
St. Finian's GAA was named after "Saint Finian the Leper" (Irish: Fíonán Lobhar). Saint Finian was a disciple of Saint Columba, who founded a monastery in Swords, as well as reportadly founding the town itself. The local church in Rivervalley, Swords is named for Saint Finian, who was the abbot of Swords Abbey.

== Notable players ==
- Brendan Gleeson
- Senan Crosbie
- Dom 'Brady' Harris
- Shane McQuillan
- Eoin O’Connor
- Anabelle Timothy

== Grounds ==
The club hosts four venues for its GAA playing pitches. The club's original pitch, now referred to as "Rivervalley Grass Pitch", is located in Rivervalley Park, with subsequent pitches being developed in Ridgewood in 2012, Nevinstown in 2014, and the opening of the Ward Vallery Recreational Hub in March 2023 saw an all-weather pitch added to Rivervalley Park in 2023. The launch of the Recreational Hub saw one of the club's original grass pitches converted into a car park.

In 2024, St. Finian's GAA purchased for-sale farmland on Cooks Road, Swords. This land is to be developed under "The Finian's Field of Dreams" initiative as a part of the club's plans for growth.

== Honours ==
- Men's Football
  - Dublin Intermediate Football Championship: Winner 2001
  - Leinster Junior Club Football Championship: Runners-Up 2000
  - Dublin Junior Football Championship: Winner 2000, 2025
  - Dublin Junior Football Championship: Runners-Up 1999, 2022
  - Dublin Junior D Football Championship: Winner 2020
  - Dublin Junior D Football Championship: Runners-Up 2015
  - Dublin AFL Div. 3: Winner 2012
- Hurling
  - Dublin Junior B Hurling Championship: Winner 2003
  - Dublin Junior B Hurling Championship: Runners-Up 1994, 1997, 2012, 2024
  - Dublin Junior H Hurling Championship (North): Runners-Up 2026
  - Dublin AHL Div. 5: Runners-Up 2026
- Ladies Football
  - Dublin LGFA Junior B Championship: Winner 2026
  - Dublin LGFA Junior B Championship: Runners-Up 2025
  - Dublin LGFA League Division 3: Runners-Up 2026
- Camogie
  - Dublin Junior Camogie League: Winner 2025
  - Dublin Junior 2 Camogie Championship: Winner 2025

== See also ==
- List of Gaelic games clubs in Dublin
- Official website
