= Beann Eadair GAA =

Gaelic games club in County Dublin, Ireland

- Beann Eadair CLG
- Founded: 1885
- County: Dublin
- Colours: Blue and white
- Grounds: Pairc O'Ruairc, Balkill Road, Howth, County Dublin

Playing kits
Standard colours

Beann Eadair GAA is a Gaelic Athletic Association club in based in Howth, Fingal.

The club has an adult men's and ladies football team and boys' and girls' underage football hurling and camogie teams at various levels.

== Achievements ==
- Dublin Junior Football Championship: (2) 1974, 2022
