= Rosmini Gaels GAA =

Gaelic games club in County Dublin, Ireland

Rosmini Gaels
- Founded: 1969
- County: Dublin
- Nickname: The Rosser
- Colours: Red & Black
- Grounds: St. Plunketts VEC

Playing kits
Standard colours

Rosmini Gaels GAA Club are based in Drumcondra, within a stone's throw of Croke Park and have been involved in the Dublin GAA scene since their foundation in 1969. Rosmini currently compete in the Dublin Junior 2 Club Football Championship.

== History ==
Founded by their Club President, Noel McLoughlin, then caretaker of Pobalscoil Rosmini on Grace Park Road, with the help of past and then-present pupils of the school, the club was set up to provide an outlet for Football and Hurling for children and adults of the Drumcondra and greater Dublin 9 area and at the outset was involved at Underage, Minor, Under 21 and Adult Junior level.

Major success was first achieved at Minor and Under 21 level in 1983/84, with members of those teams, such as Cormac Day, Paddy Flynn and Bernie O'Toole, still playing with the current Junior team.

In 1984/85 Philip McElwee, a teacher in Rosmini School, took over the management and coaching of the adult team and in 1985 made a Junior Football clean sweep, becoming the first club to win the treble of Junior Championship, Junior League, (Division 1), and the Joy Cup. On that treble-winning team were notable inter-county players such as Brian Ladden, Brian Looney and Jim Woods, (Kerry), Gerry McGovern, (Longford), and Dublin Minor stars in the shape of Paddy Flynn and Paul Redmond.

A number of years in the Intermediate league followed but by the early 1990s Rosmini had slipped down a few divisions until the arrival of Player/Manager Timmy Walsh from Cork. Timmy masterminded a revival in the club's fortunes and secured promotion to Junior Division 2 in 1994,

The following season in 1995 brought even greater success with a Division 2 League title and Parson Cup double. Notably, twelve of the 1985 treble-winning squad were still involved in the successes of 1994/95.

Notable players from 1995 include Paul Baitson (Dublin), Padraig Reilly(Cavan), Mike, Fibarr, Brian, Stephen Carrig (Kerry), Barney Fitzgerald (Dublin), Cormac Day(Dublin), Gary Power (Kildare), Gavin Murphy (Meath), Paddy Flynn (Dublin), Stephen Nolan (Dublin), Seamus Reilly (god only knows!) Mattin McHugh (Mayo) Enda (Galway) Norman Gernan (Dublin).

In the following years, Rosmini Gaels held their own in the upper Junior divisions but a crisis point was reached in 2000/2001 when the club were finding it very difficult to get new players involved. With many bigger neighbouring clubs developing greatly and offering more modern facilities, the club faced closure.

The club re-graded to the lower Junior divisions, thereby providing Sunday afternoon matches. This move proved attractive to both current and new players.

Rosmini finished as runners-up in the Duffy Cup Final in 2009.

However, in 2010, Rosmini were again Dublin Football Championship winners, beating Croi Ro Naofa in the Junior E Final in O'Toole Park.

In 2012 Rosmini again tasted success in the Dublin Junior E Football Championship with a 1-8 to 1-5 victory over St Kevins Killians with Reilly again involved as a second half sub to win his third championship medal.

Rosmini are still operating and are involved in Football League, Cup and Championship competitions.

== Club Colours/Pitch ==
Rosmini Gaels' colours are black and red vertical stripes and they play their home games at Plunkett's VEC College grounds, Whitehall.

== Club Honours ==
- 1983 Murphy Cup Winners
- 1983 Junior Football League Division Four Winners
- 1984 Parson Cup Winners
- 1984 Junior Football League Division Two Runners Up
- 1985 Junior A Football Championship Winners
- 1985 Junior Football League Division One Winners
- 1985 Conlon Cup Winners
- 1994 Junior Football League Division Three Runners Up
- 1995 Parson Cup Winners
- 1995 Junior Football League Division Three Winners
- 1996 Conlon Cup Winners
- 2009 Duffy Cup Runners Up
- 2010 Junior E Football Championship Winners
- 2012 Junior E Football Championship Winners
- 2015 Junior E Football Championship Runners Up
- 2017 Duffy Cup Runners Up
- 2017 Junior E Football Championship Runners Up
- 2018 Inner City Tournament Winners
- 2019 AFL Division Nine Runners Up
- 2024 Inner City Tournament Winners
