= Shane Carthy =

GAA player

Personal information
- Native name: Shane Ó Carthaigh (Irish)
- Born: 24 November 1994 (age 31) Dublin, Ireland
- Height: 1.80 m (5 ft 11 in)

Sport
- Sport: Gaelic football
- Position: Midfield
Club
- Years: Club
- 2011–: Naomh Mearnog
Club titles
- Dublin titles: 2
- Leinster titles: 2
- All-Ireland Titles: 1
Inter-county
- Years: County
- 2014–: Dublin
Inter-county titles
- Leinster titles: 1
- All-Irelands: 1
- NFL: 1
- All Stars: 0

Shane Carthy is a Gaelic footballer who plays for Naomh Mearnóg CLG and for the Dublin county team. He was a member of the Dublin squad that won the 2016 All-Ireland Senior Football Championship and the 2016 National Football League.

In January 2021, he discussed his mental health and how he confided in his manager on The Late Late Show.

== Honours ==
- All-Ireland Senior Football Championship (1): 2013
- Leinster Senior Football Championship (1): 2013
- All-Ireland Under-21 Football Championship (1): 2014
- Leinster Under-21 Football Championship (1): 2014
- All-Ireland Minor Football Championship (1): 2012
