= Raheny GAA =

Gaelic games club in County Dublin, Ireland

- CLG Ráth Éanna
- Founded: 1958
- County: Dublin
- Colours: Maroon and White
- Grounds: within St Anne's Park
- Coordinates: 53°22′42.58″N 6°10′42.95″W

Playing kits
Standard colours

Raheny GAA (Irish: CLG Rath Éanna ), founded 1958, is a Gaelic Athletic Association club based in Raheny, Dublin.

== History ==
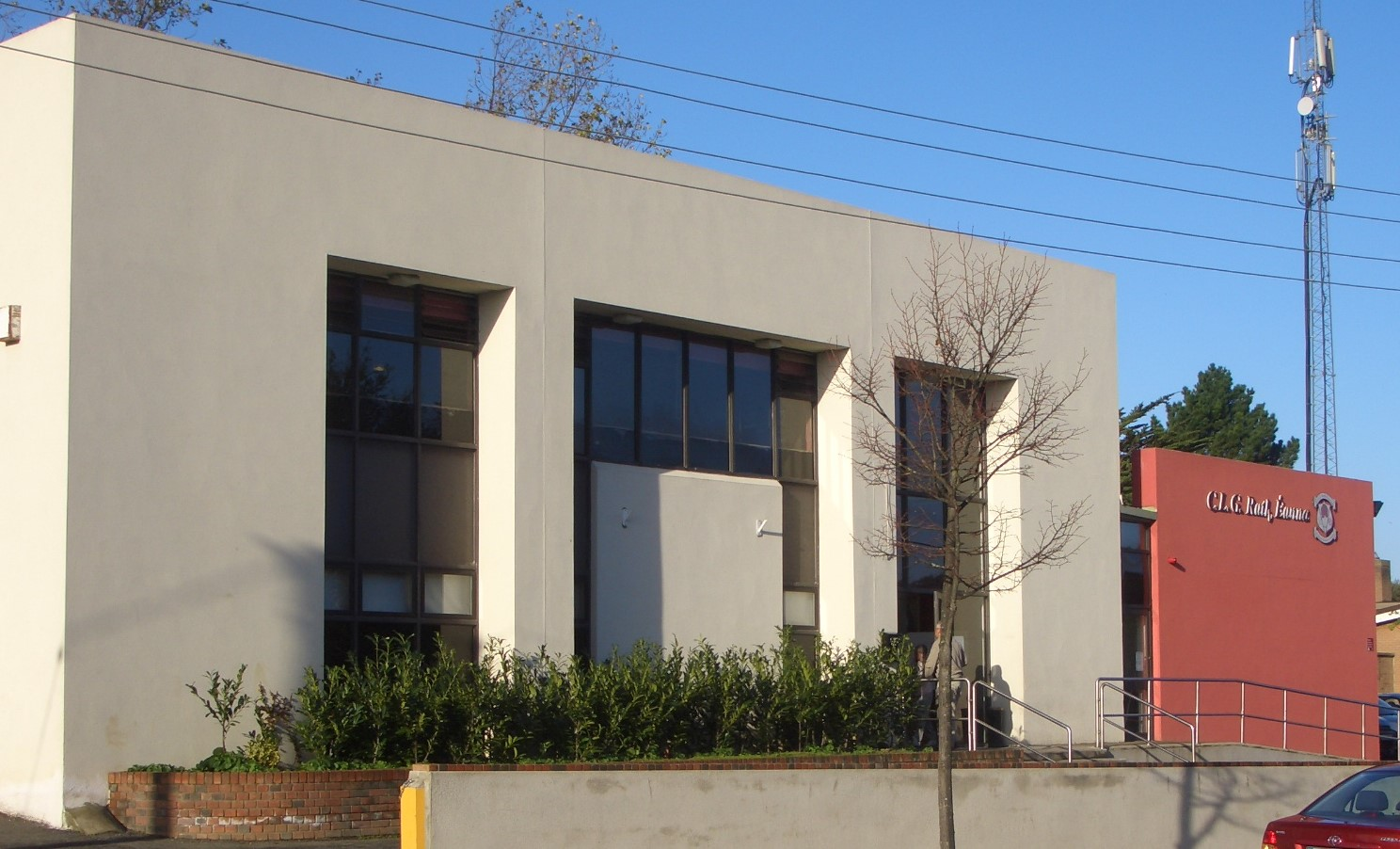
Raheny GAA Clubhouse

The club was established in 1958, and was at first one of two clubs in the area, though the other, St Vincent's, with grounds at The Oval in central Raheny, served a different catchment.

Raheny were the 2007 Dublin Intermediate Hurling Championship after they defeated Ballyboden St Endas by 0–16 to 0–12 at O'Toole Park. Raheny last won the intermediate championship in 1970. Raheny won promotion to Dublin AFL Division 1 from Dublin AFL Division 2 in 2007 for the 2008 season.

== Roll of Honour ==
- Dublin Senior Football Championship: Runners-Up 1970
- Dublin Intermediate Football Championship: Winners 1997
- Dublin Junior C Football Championship Winner 2014
- Dublin Under 21 Football Championship: Winners 1972
- Dublin Minor Football Championship: Winners 1972, 1973
- Dublin Minor C Football Championship Winners 2013, 2018
- Dublin Senior Football League Division 2 Winners 2007
- Dublin AFL Div. 5 Winners 2012
- Dublin Senior B Hurling Championship: Winners 2017
- Dublin Senior B Football Championship: Runners-Up 2017
- Dublin Intermediate Hurling Championship: Winners 1990, 2007
- Dublin Junior Hurling Championship: Winners 1969, 2004
- Dublin Junior D Hurling Championship Winner 2012

== Notable players ==
=== Club football players ===
==== Dublin senior men's SFC inter-county footballers ====
- Brian Fenton
- Brian Howard
- Seán MacMahon
- Paddy Gogarty
- David Henry
- David Hickey
- Alan Larkin
- Ciarán Whelan

==== Lady footballers ====
- Siobhán Killeen – Republic of Ireland women's international footballer
