= Man-O-War GFC =

Gaelic Athletic Association club

- An Long Cogaidh
- Founded: 1946
- County: Dublin
- Nickname: The 'War
- Colours: Yellow and Blue
- Grounds: Man-O-War
- Coordinates: 53°33′07.55″N 6°11′16.03″W

Playing kits
Standard colours

Man-O-War GFC is a Gaelic Athletic Association (GAA) club based in Man of War, County Dublin, Ireland. Founded in 1946, the club is affiliated with Dublin GAA. The club's grounds are located between Lusk , Skerries and Balbriggan.

== History ==
=== Formation and development ===
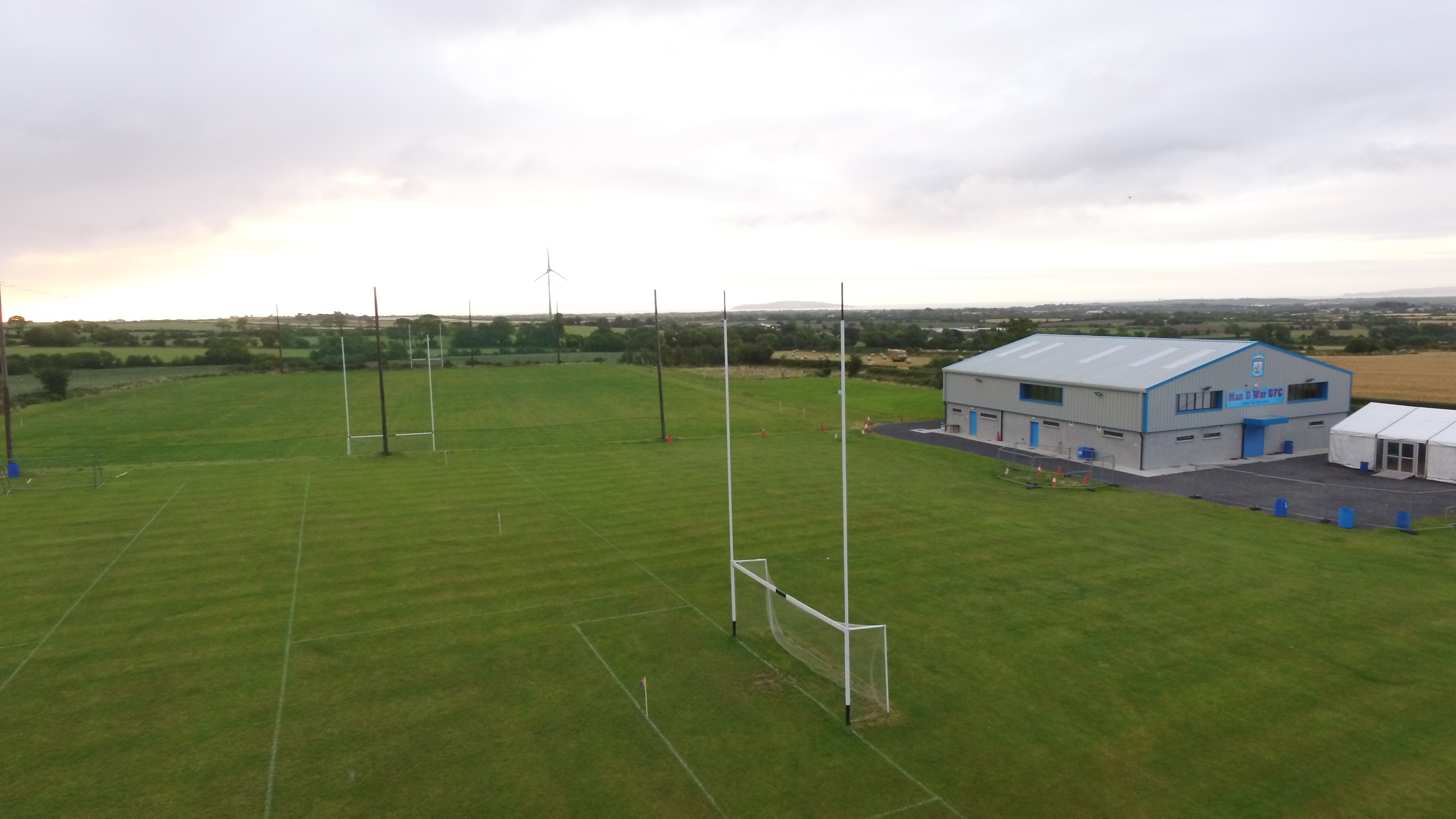
Club grounds

The club was founded in 1946. It was formed following a 'challenge' match between Hedgestown and the Man Of War. Both sides had difficulty fielding a full team, so they decided to amalgamate. In 1954, the club won its first trophy – the Nugent Cup for the Fingal Junior League.

The club went on to win several other regional trophies, before winning the Dublin Junior Football Championship in 1979. The club had sporadic successes during the late 1980s and 1990s with the men's team then playing football in Division 8.

The Ladies section of the club began in October 1992 with a minor team composed of girls ranging from 12 to 17 years. In 1995, the Ladies minor team finished runners-up in the league. In 1999, the ladies team went through the Division 3 North League campaign undefeated and defeated St Peregines in the playoff for the Division 3 title and promotion to Division 2.

=== 21st century ===
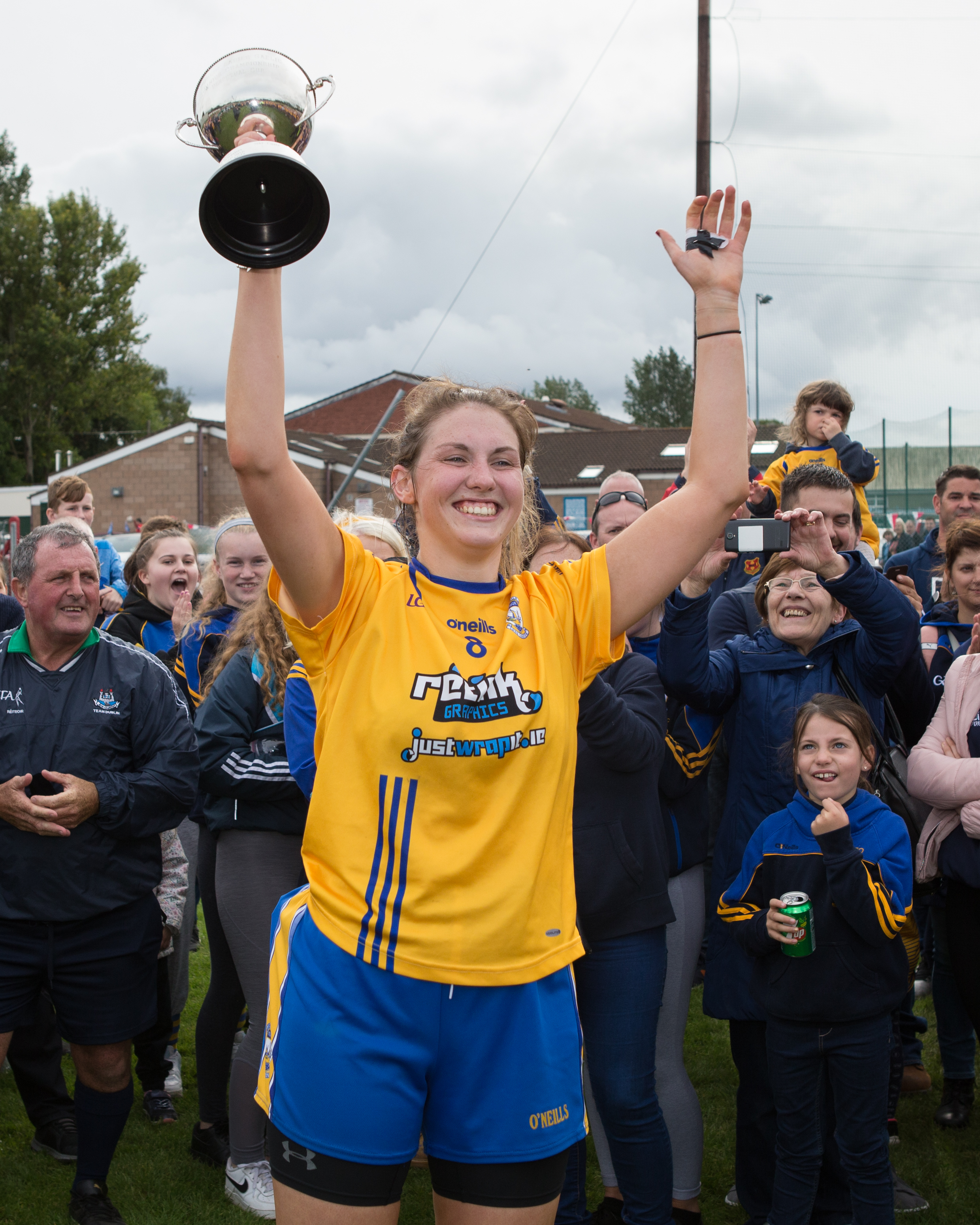
Ladies captain lifts the 2019 championship trophy

In 2005, the club won the Parson Cup and earned a return to Division 7. In subsequent years the team progressed through Division 6 to Division 5. The men's team reached (but lost) the 2006 Junior 'B' Championship Final. In May 2007, the club won the Division 6 title and the Stacey Cup were won later in the year, followed by the Conlon Cup in 2008.

The ladies team campaigned in Division 2 until 2008, ultimately progressing to the Intermediate Championship Finals in 2003 and 2004 at Parnell Park where they were runners-up on both occasions.

In 2005, the club were invited to participate in the Powerscreen International 7s Tournament in Toronto. The travelling party consisted of 53 people, made up of a men's 'A' team, a men's 'B' team, a ladies team and supporters. The ladies team were beaten in the Senior Final after a game against Donoughmore, County Tyrone. The men's 'A' team were beaten in the Senior semi-final by the eventual winners and the men's 'B' team were knocked out before the Junior semi-finals.

The Ladies Adult Team won the Junior A Championship in 2019. The final, which took place in September 2019, saw the ladies team beat O'Dwyers in Lawless Memorial Park in Swords. It was the first ladies adult championship for the club.

In August 2022, Man O'War GFC celebrated 30 years of Ladies Football at the club. A commemorative game was played, preceded by a reception in the club's hall where photographs from over the 30 years was on display. After the game, the participating players were presented with a medal and speeches were held.

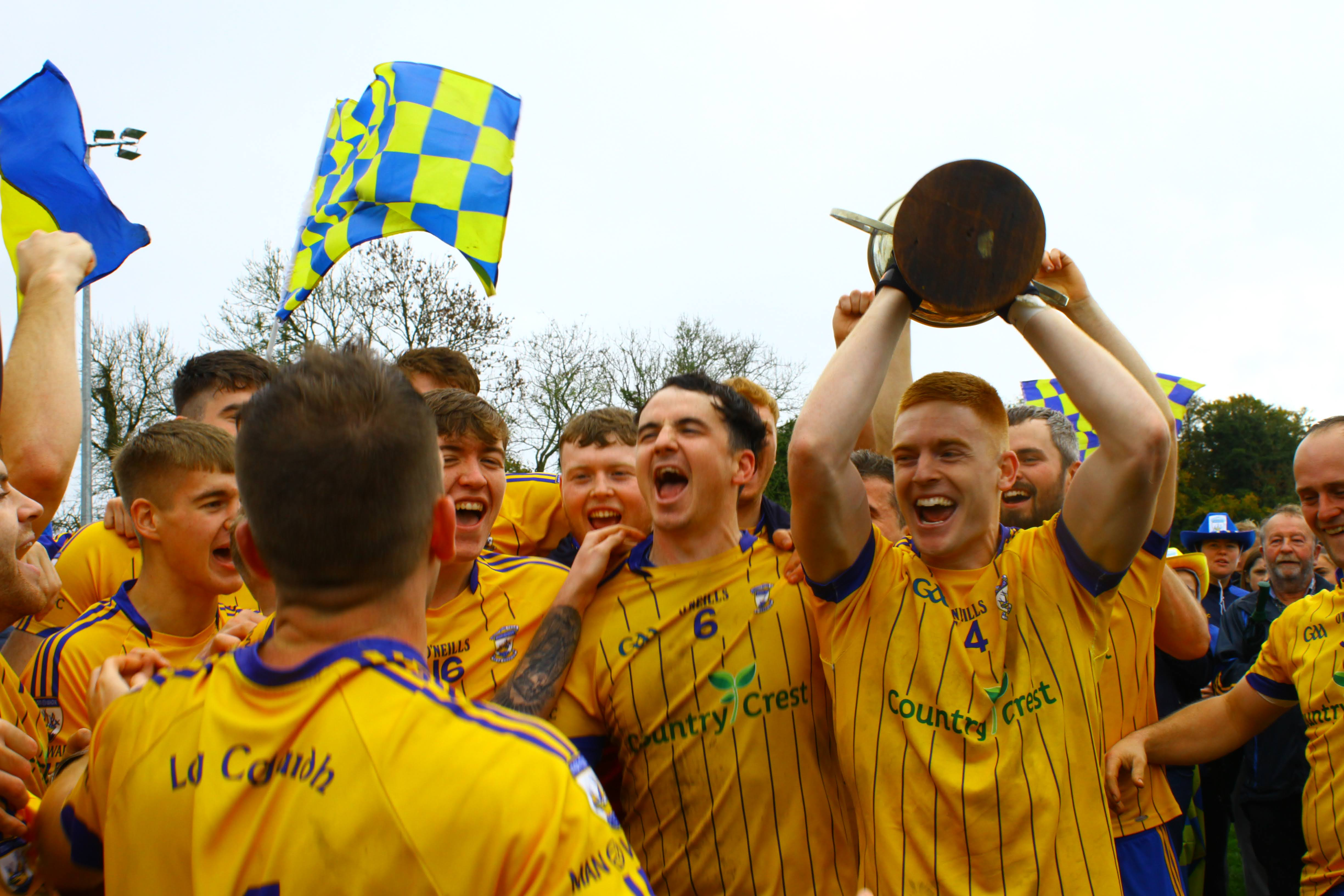
Man O'War lift the 2023 Men's Dublin Junior 1 Championship

The Mens Adult Team won the Dublin Junior 1 Championship, for the first time in 44 years, in October 2023. The 2023 final, in which the club defeated O'Dwyers GAA by 2–9 to 0–10, was tightly contested.

== Roll of honour ==
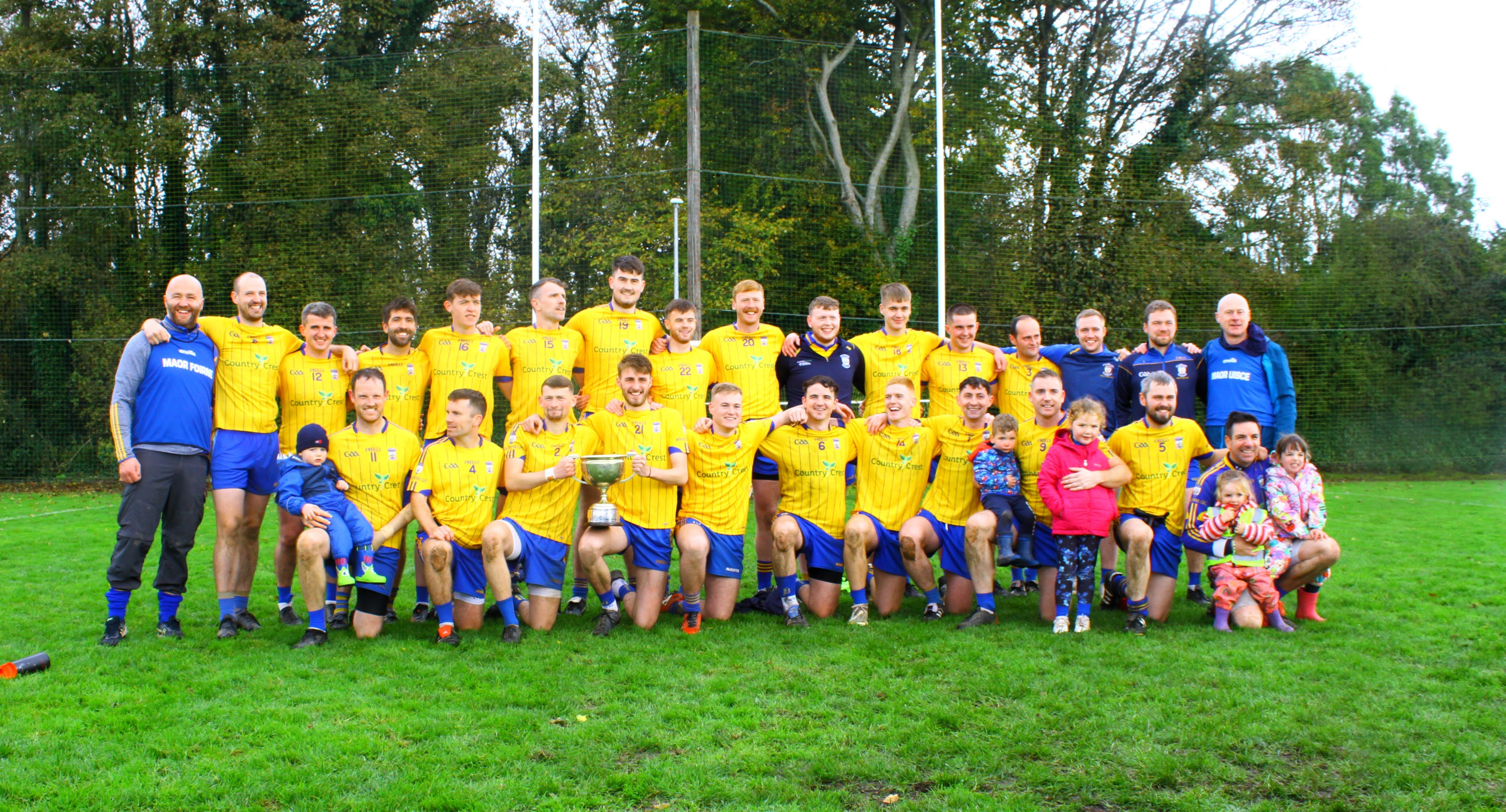
2023 Men's Junior 1 Championship winners

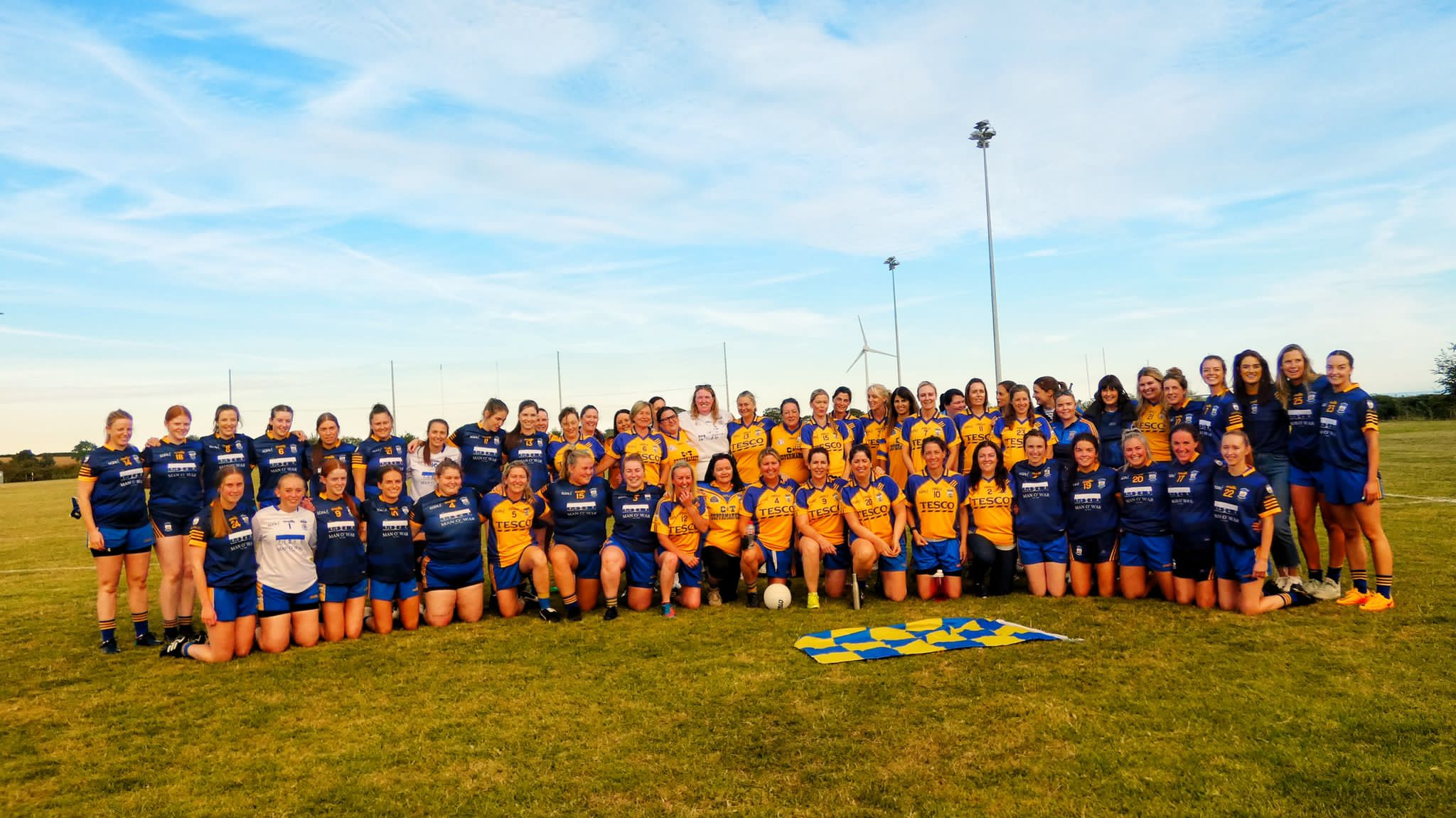
Ladies players in 2023

- Dublin Junior Football Championship (2): 1979, 2023
- Dublin AFL Div. 6 (1): 2007
- Dublin Ladies Junior A Football Championship (1): 2019
