= Parnells GAA =

Gaelic games club in County Dublin, Ireland

Parnells
- An Cumann Parnell C.L.G.
- Founded: 1893
- County: Dublin
- Nickname: The Nells
- Colours: Black and Green
- Grounds: Coolock, Dublin
- Coordinates: 6953°23′19.32″N 6°12′15.92″W

Playing kits
Standard colours

Senior Club Championships
	All Ireland	Leinster champions	Dublin champions
Football:	-	1	6

Parnells GAA or Parnells Gaelic Athletic Association club Gaelic football club was a Gaelic Athletic Association club based in Coolock, Dublin, Ireland. It was founded in 1893, named after the recently deceased Charles Stewart Parnell, and at that time was known as Parnell Volunteers. Parnells won the Dublin senior football championship on six occasions, in 1913, 1916, 1939, 1945 and most recently in 1987, 1988. Following financial mismanagement the club entered liquidation and was wound up in January 2025.

== Coming of Age ==
Within ten years of the club's foundation Parnell's had become well established in Dublin GAA circles. Indeed, as well as competing in local competitions, the club was now competing and contributing players to Dublin as well.

The Dublin Senior football Team winners of the Croke Cup 1897, featuring Joe Teeling of Parnell's

The Dublin Senior Football team of 1902 included three Parnell's players.

Parnell's won the final of the Wolfe Tone Tournament in 1903 against Clane. The same team won the Kiltiernan and Malahide Tournaments.

In 1907-08 Parnell's were the winners of the Junior Football Championship, The Intermediate League and the Martyn Cup.

The Dublin Junior Football Team (Parnell's Selection) won the Leinster Championship in 1908.

Parnell's won the Senior Football Championship in 1913 and 1916.

The Parnell's Junior Team 1916-1917 won the North County League, and were runners-up in the Junior Championship.

Parnell's had two players in the all Ireland Final in 1920.

Parnell's Minor Team 1919–1920 were winners of the Dublin League.

Parnell's in 1924 were winners of the North County League

== The Easter Rising ==
Parnell members that took part in the Easter Rising 1916 were Peader Christie, Owen McDermot, John Joyce, Patrick Lanigan of Artane and Thomas Reilly, John Brien of Donnycarney and Martin Mullen fought in Jacobs. Edmund Boland of Marino and Martin Savage of Co Sligo fought in the GPO. Peter Coates and Charles Kenny of North Strand fought in Stephens Green and Boland's Mills.

In July 1916 three Parnell's men - Peader Christie, Owen McDermot and John Joyce played on a Dublin selection against Wexford prisoners. Shortly afterwards some of the prisoners were released, including men who were to help Parnell's win their second Senior Football Championship.

== The Golden Jubilee (1934) ==
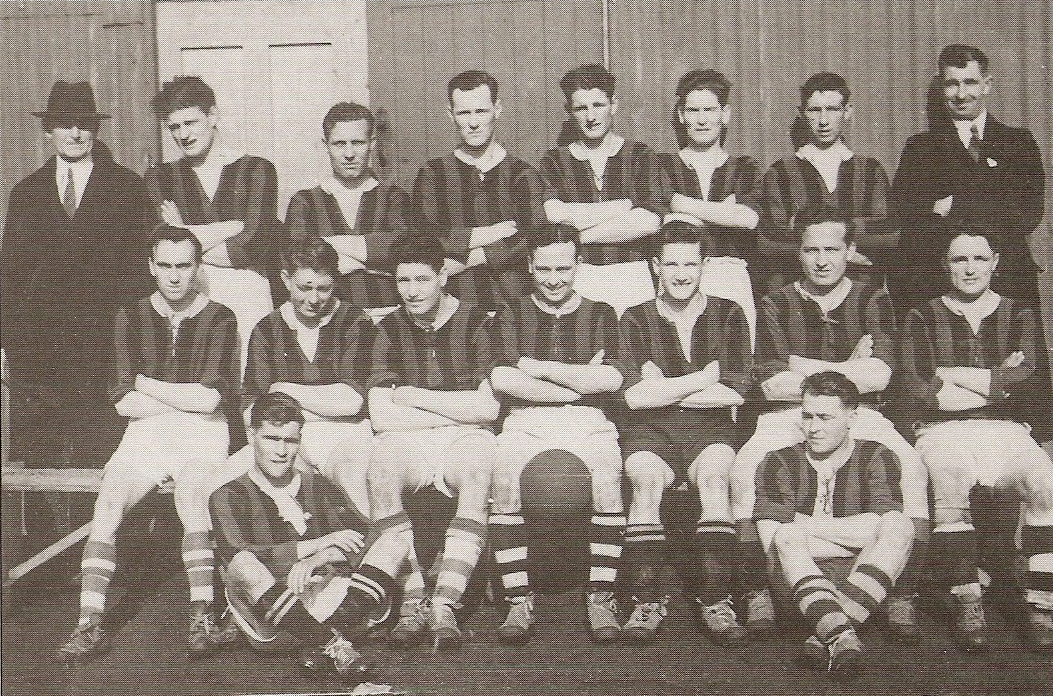
Parnells 1938 - Winners Senior League Division II, Back Row:WR Quinn(secretary) J.Gibbons, M. McCann, Padraig Toolan, E. Boland, D. Quinn, P. O'Connor, J. Flood. Middle row: J. Hunt, W. Brien, B. Quinn, J. Teeling(capt.), P. Kilbride, R. McCann, P. Deegan. Front Row: T. Mahady, P. Power

During 1934 GAA members celebrated the Golden Jubilee of the foundation of the association. All clubs were urged to organise their own celebrations during the course of the year.

Unfortunately for Parnell's their senior footballers fared badly in league matches in the first few months of the year. Matters improved somewhat when they defeated Dolphins in the first round of the championship. Success was short-lived. On 20 May 1934 at Croke Park they were beaten 2–4 to 1–6 in the quarter-final.

The following year, 1935, the senior footballers lost the first round of the Championship when they were defeated 1–6 to 0-1 by Garda, the eventual winners. Corner Forward Jim Brady of Parnell's was a member of the Dublin Senior Football team beaten by Louth in the 1935 Leinster Championship. The following year did not bring any relief to the club; nevertheless, the officials, selectors and players struggled on manfully in the hope of better times ahead.

During 1937 the club did not enter the junior league or the Championship but concentrated on the Minor and Senior Level. In the first round of the Senior Championship, Parnell's were drawn against Sean Mc Dermott's. Their first encounter ended in a draw, but Sean Mc Dermott's went on to win the replay with ease.

In 1938 Parnell's won the Second Division of the senior Football League. The team was strengthened by the inclusion of ex-St Vincent's minors including Brendan Quinn, Johnny Gibbons, Tom McCann, Pádraig Toolan, Ned Boland, Albert Farrell, Mick Delaney, George Ingham, Robert Hurley, Andy Hanratty and Frank Moore. They met Dolphins in the final of Division II and defeated them by 2–7 to 0–1. The victories of 1938 paved the way for further feats in 1939.

== Collapse ==
The end of Parnells can be traced to the 2008 decision to move most of its training fields from a site near Dublin Airport, sold for €22 million, which the club then used to buy the sports fields of Chanel College on a 999-year lease from the Marist Fathers. The hub of the new headquarters was a large sports and social club called The Chanel, which contained a fitness centre, restaurant, and banquet facilities.

An RTÉ Prime Time investigation in June 2025 found substantial amounts of fiscal irresponsibility following the sale, including:

- The lease of the ground technically being void since 2012, as they never completed a promised gym and hurling wall for Chanel College pupils to use
- More than €1m being spent on staff salaries out of a €3m annual turnover
- The club failing to keep up on dues payments to Dublin GAA and nearly having the electricity turned off due to unpaid bills
- Five-figure expenses payments for senior football players who transferred into the club, who also took advantage of a club-leased apartment in Artane
- Two failed tax audits, the first in 2013

The investigation reported that club members had raised the issue of Parnells' tenuous finances to the GAA head office in 2011, however their reports were largely not acted upon. Even the decision by star player Stephen Cluxton to voluntarily drop to the reserves in 2014, stating in a letter that he was "disgusted that the club is now in debt", did not change the course of the club.

The COVID-19 pandemic and associated shutdowns of hospitality (such as The Chanel) proved to be the final nail in the coffin for Parnells, which went into liquidation owing roughly €1.5 million to creditors, including €475,000 to the GAA and a separate €300,000 to the Dublin county board. The fields and function centre are now owned by the Marists. A phoenix club, Pobal Parnell, was formed in 2025 to keep Gaelic sports active in Coolock; however, they do not at this time have access to any of the old Parnells facilities.

== Facilities ==
In 2012, Parnells acquired the sports fields of Chanel College, adjoining their Coolock clubhouse, and built a new sports complex on the site, consisting of several floodlit all-weather pitches, training facilities, and a social centre. Chanel College now makes use of those facilities. The previous clubhouse, located at the entrance to the new facilities, was demolished in the process. They also had a gym at St. David's CBS school in Artane. The club had no connection (other than through the GAA) with Parnell Park in nearby Donnycarney.

Paul Bealin was managing the club in 2013 when he was appointed as manager of the Westmeath senior football team.

== Achievements ==
- Dublin Senior Football Championship: Winners 1913, 1916, 1939, 1945, 1987, 1988
- Dublin Intermediate Football Championship: Winners 2004
- Dublin Junior Football Championship: Winners 1983, 2011
- Dublin Junior B Football Championship Winner 2009
- Dublin Junior C Football Championship Winner 2011
- Dublin Senior Football League Division 1 Winners 1928
- Dublin AFL Div. 5: Winners 2013
- Dublin AFL Div. 6: Winners 2011
- Dublin AFL Div. 8: Winners 2011
- Dublin AFL Div. 10: Winners 2009
- Dublin Senior B Hurling Championship: Winners 2013
- Dublin Junior Hurling Championship Winners 2011
- Dublin Junior B Hurling Championship Winner 2010
- Dublin Junior D Hurling Championship Winner 2010
- Dublin Junior E Hurling Championship Winner 2009

== Notable players ==
=== Ireland international rules football team players ===
- (Republic of Ireland) Stephen Cluxton

=== Senior inter-county footballers ===
Dublin

- Stephen Cluxton

Galway

- Brian Talty

Mayo

- Conor Mortimer

Laois

- Colm Parkinson

=== Senior inter-county ladies' footballers ===
Dublin

- Niamh McEvoy
- Lindsay Peat
- Avril Cluxton
- Chloe Darby

=== Senior inter-county hurlers ===
Laois

- Darren Rooney

=== Others ===
Republic of Ireland football international

- (Republic of Ireland) Shay Gibbons
- (Republic of Ireland) Jeff Hendrick

Ireland women's rugby union international

- (Ireland) Lindsay Peat

Politicians

- Charles Haughey, former Taoiseach
