= Liffey Gaels GAA =

Gaelic games club in County Dublin, Ireland

- Gaeil na Life
- Founded: 1951
- County: Dublin
- Colours: Maroon and sky blue
- Grounds: Sarsfield Road, Ballyfermot, Dublin 10

Playing kits
Standard colours

Liffey Gaels GAA is a Gaelic Athletic Association club in based in the Inchicore and Ballyfermot areas of Dublin.

== History ==
The club was founded in 1951 and was known as Rialto Gaels at that time.

In the 1970s and 1980s the name was changed to "SS Michaels & James" as St Michael's CBS & St James's CBS were the two schools which most of the club members originated from.

Their colours at the time were Maroon & white (no blue). Two of the mentors who were the driving force at the time were Brian Greg & Sean Fox.

The change of name to Liffey Gaels came in the early 1980s.

The club has adult football, hurling and camogie teams and underage teams at various levels.

On 4 March 2016, the club announced that it would be merging with neighbours Good Counsel for their upcoming adult hurling campaign and would be playing under the name "Counsel Gaels".

The club played its last match under the Liffey Gaels name versus St Vincents on 11 November 2018.
