= St Monica's GAA =

Gaelic games club in County Dublin, Ireland

- Founded: 1964
- County: Dublin
- Colours: Blue and white
- Grounds: Edenmore Park (the back pitch)

Playing kits
Standard colours

Senior Club Championships
	All Ireland	Leinster champions	Dublin champions
Ladies' football:	–	–	1

St Monica's GAA is a Gaelic Athletic Association club in based in Edenmore, Raheny, in the northern suburbs of Dublin in Ireland.

The club was formed in 1964 and was originally called Edenmore Gaels. The club name was changed, in 1968, to St Monica's after the local parish church.

In 1989, the club's Ladies' Gaelic football team won the Dublin Ladies' Senior Football Championship.

St Monica's fields adult men's Gaelic football and ladies football teams, a minor team and a small number of teams at juvenile levels. The club plays its home games at Edenmore Park (Millwood Park) in Raheny.
