= Innisfails GAA =

Gaelic games club in County Dublin, Ireland

- Founded: 1886
- County: Dublin
- Colours: Green and black
- Grounds: Carrs Lane, Balgriffin, Dublin 13

Playing kits
Standard colours

Innisfails GAA is a Gaelic Athletic Association club in based in Balgriffin, Fingal.

The club fields boys and girls from under 8's to Minor and has a free nursery for children aged 4–7 years.

During the COVID-19 pandemic in the Republic of Ireland, the Irish Independent published photographs of a coach-led group of Dublin county football team members, including All Stars Footballer of the Year Brian Fenton, whom it reported had gathered at Innisfails GAA club before 7am on the previous morning. The session occurred around 12 hours after the GAA sent a note to each club and county, warning that any club or county team ignoring the collective training ban could risk putting the GAA's intentions to return to action "in serious jeopardy". That evening, after investigating the accuracy of the report, Dublin GAA suspended its own football team manager Dessie Farrell for 12 weeks with immediate effect. The incident provoked much public commentary from politicians and sportspeople.

== Honours ==
- Dublin Junior Football Championship; 1937, 1943, 1973, 2001
- Dublin Intermediate Football Championship: 1984
