= O'Dwyers GAA =

Sports club in County Dublin, Ireland

O'Dwyers GAA Club
- Cumann Uí Dhuibhir
- Founded: 1918
- County: Dublin
- Nickname: The Boys in green
- Colours: Green and White
- Grounds: Bremore Park
- Coordinates: 53°37′01.94″N 6°11′45.20″W

Playing kits
Standard colours

O'Dwyers GAA is a Gaelic Athletic Association club based at Hamlet Lane, Balbriggan, County Dublin, Ireland, serving the communities of Balbriggan, Balrothery, Balscadden and surrounding areas. Its principal grounds are at Bremore Park, but it also has grounds at Bells Field, Balbriggan, opposite the club house.

The club operates a "skills camp" on a Saturday morning for five- to eight-year-olds, indoors during winter. The club plays football at U-8 (mixed), U-9 (mixed), U-10 (mixed), U11(mixed), U-12 (boys) and U-14 (boys). Girls football is played at U-13, U-14 and U-15. Hurling is catered for ages U-8 (mixed), U9 (mixed), U-10 (boys), U-12 (boys) and U-14 (boys). There is a juvenile camogie team, aimed at girls aged 10/12 years old. There has been some success at juvenile level, with league and cup wins.

At adult level the club has one football team competing in AFL5 and the Dublin Intermediate Football Championship and one Junior hurling team (AHL9).

The club also has a culture club and for part of the year, adults and juvenile members learn set-dancing on a Monday night. Also during the week, tin-whistle and fiddle classes take place in the club house.

== Roll of honour ==
- Dublin Intermediate Football Championship: Winners 1956
- Dublin Junior Football Championship: Winners 1950, 2020
- Dublin Junior C Football Championship Winners 2002
- Dublin AFL Division 1: Winners 1970
- Dublin AFL Div. 10: Winners 2013
- Dublin Junior B Hurling Championship: Winners 2006
- Dublin Junior C Hurling Championship Winners 2003

== Notable players ==
- Keith Gorman, O'Byrne Cup winner with Dublin
- John O'Leary, former O Byrne cup winner with dublin
- Stephen Rooney, former Dublin inter-county footballer
- George Wilson, former Dublin inter-county footballer
- Stephen Melia, former Louth inter-county footballer
- Colm Nally, former Louth inter-county goalkeeper

Preceded by Craobh Chiaráin	Dublin Junior Football Champions; 2020	Succeeded by Incumbent
