= St Vincents GAA =

Sports club in County Dublin, Ireland

St Vincents
- Naomh Uinsionn
- Founded: 1931
- County: Dublin
- Nickname: Vinnys
- Colours: White and blue
- Grounds: Páirc Naomh Uinsionn
- Coordinates: 53°22′24″N 6°13′45″W

Playing kits
Home Kit	Change Kit

Senior Club Championships
	All Ireland	Leinster champions	Dublin champions
Football:	3	7	29
Hurling:	-	-	13
Camogie:	-	4	18

St Vincents is a Gaelic Athletic Association (GAA) club based in Marino, on the northside of Dublin, Ireland. The club was founded in 1931. Although the club's grounds were in Raheny for a number of years, it moved to its home back into Marino in 1987. St Vincents merged with Marino Camogie Club in 1997 to form the St. Vincents Hurling, Football and Camogie Club. St Vincents have won the All-Ireland Senior Club Football Championship on three occasions, most recently in 2014. They are the most successful side in the Dublin Senior Football championship having won the title 29 times. The club has also won 18 Dublin Senior 1 camogie titles (6 as Marino).

== Grounds ==
As well as using their own pitches at their clubhouse and Páirc Naomh Uinsionn, the club uses nearby pitches at Ardscoil Ris (where facilities were redeveloped in 2020 in association with St. Vincents), the pitch at Marino Institute of Education adjacent to the club, in Fairview Park, and also in St Anne's Park. In 2019, a 4G all-weather GAA pitch was installed.

The club grounds in Marino were developed largely on what was part of the walled garden of Lord Charlemont's estate, which had become Christian Brothers' St. Mary's Teacher training college (Colaiste Mhuire/Marino Institute) grounds and the O'Brien Institute. Part of the walls of the garden can still be seen to the south and east (Casino Park) borders of the club grounds. A logo of Marino Casino and part of the Charlemont family motto (Ferro Comitante), the full motto is Deo Duce, Ferro Comitante (God as my leader, my sword my companion), are embossed on the club's crest.

== Honours ==
=== Football ===
Vincents have won the Dublin Senior Football Championship 29 times. Their nearest rivals are O'Tooles who have won the Dublin Championship on 11 occasions. St Vincents won in the years 1949, 1950, 1951, 1952, 1953, 1954, 1955, 1957, 1958, 1959, 1960, 1961, 1962, 1964, 1966, 1967, 1970, 1971, 1972, 1975, 1976, 1977, 1981, 1984, 2007, 2013, 2014, 2016 and 2017.

The club have seven consecutive (1949-1955) and six consecutive (1957-1962) winning seasons in the Dublin Senior Championship and, in two additional instances, had three consecutive (1970-1972, 1975-1975) seasons.

They have also won Leinster football titles on seven occasions (1972, 1975, 1984, 2007, 2013, 2014 and 2016),

St Vincents highest accolades to date were their three All-Ireland Senior Club Football Championship titles in 1976, 2008 and 2014. In the 1976 decider, they defeated Roscommon Gaels by 4–10 to 0–05 and in 2008 they overcame Nemo Rangers by 1–11 to 0–13 in the final at Croke Park. In 2014, the club won its third All-Ireland title having defeated Castlebar Mitchels by 4–12 to 2–11.

St Vincents are also the most successful club in the Dublin Minor Football Championship. They have won the competition on 23 occasions in 1936, 1942, 1943, 1945, 1946, 1947, 1948, 1950, 1955, 1956, 1958, 1959, 1970, 1971, 1978, 1979, 1980, 1981, 1982, 1983, 1986, 1987 and 1994.

St Vincents also captured a "double double" in 1993/94 capturing the U21 Football & Hurling Championships in two consecutive seasons.

==== List of football honours ====
- All-Ireland Senior Club Football Championship: 1975-76, 2007–08, 2013–14
- Leinster Senior Club Football Championship: 1972–73, 1975–76, 1984–85, 2007–08, 2013–14, 2014–15, 2016–17
- Dublin Senior Football Championship: 1949, 1950, 1951, 1952, 1953, 1954, 1955, 1957, 1958, 1959, 1960, 1961, 1962, 1964, 1966, 1967, 1970, 1971, 1972, 1975, 1976, 1977, 1981, 1984, 2007, 2013, 2014, 2016, 2017
- Dublin Senior Football League: 2015, 2018
- Dublin Intermediate Football Championship: 1953, 1977, 1991, 2015
- Dublin Junior Football Championship: 1976, 1984, 1991, 1995, 1997, 2014
- Dublin Junior C Football Championship: 2006,2010, 2016
- Dublin Under 21 Football Championship: 1973, 1978, 1980, 1982, 1984, 1993, 1994, 2004
- Dublin Minor A Football Championship: 1936, 1942, 1943, 1945, 1946, 1947, 1948, 1950, 1955, 1956, 1958, 1959, 1970, 1971, 1978, 1979, 1980, 1981, 1982, 1983, 1986, 1987, 1994
- Dublin Minor B Football Championship: 2017
- Dublin AFL Div. 5: 2014
- Dublin AFL Div. 6: 2013

=== Hurling ===
Although St Vincents are better known for Gaelic football, they have also been successful as a senior hurling side. St Vincents have won the Dublin Senior Hurling Championship 13 times (second in the roll of honour behind Faughs), collecting the title in the years 1953, 1954, 1955, 1957, 1960, 1962, 1964, 1967, 1975, 1981, 1982, 1988 and 1993. St Vincents competed in the 2007 and 2010 Dublin Senior Hurling Championship finals but lost to Ballyboden St Endas on both occasions. St Vincents are the most successful club in the history of the Dublin Minor Hurling Championship. They have won the A competition on twenty occasions, most recently in 2002.

==== List of hurling honours ====
- Dublin Senior Hurling Championship: 1953, 1954. 1955, 1957, 1960, 1962, 1964, 1967, 1975, 1981, 1982, 1988, 1993
- Dublin Intermediate Hurling Championship: 1953, 1981, 1984, 1988, 1998, 2000, 2003, 2008, 2014
- Dublin Junior Hurling Championship: 1943, 1948, 1957, 1980, 1990, 2006
- Dublin Junior B Hurling Championship: 2016, 2019
- Dublin Junior C Hurling Championship: 2010
- Dublin Junior E Hurling Championship: 2025, 2026
- Dublin Under 21 Hurling Championship: 1967, 1971, 1978, 1979, 1980, 1983, 1993, 1994
- Dublin Minor A Hurling Championship: 1936, 1943, 1944, 1945, 1946, 1947, 1948, 1949, 1950, 1951, 1955, 1957, 1961, 1962, 1966, 1971, 1978, 1979, 1982, 1988, 1990, 1991, 2002
- Dublin Minor C Hurling Championship: 2009
- Dublin Minor D Hurling Championship: 2009, 2015

=== Camogie ===
==== List of camogie honours ====
- Dublin Senior 1 Championship:
  - Marino: (6) 1990, 1992, 1993, 1994, 1995, 1996
  - St Vincent's: (12) 1998, 2005, 2007, 2015, 2016, 2017, 2019, 2022, 2023, 2024, 2025, 2026
- Dublin Senior 2 Championship: 2010
- Leinster Senior Championship: 1998, 2019, 2022, 2024

== Notable players ==
=== Football ===
- Michael Savage
- Ger Brennan
- Diarmuid Connolly
- Eamonn Fennell
- Tomás Quinn
- David O'Gorman
- Shane Carthy
- Des Ferguson
- Des Foley
- Jackie Gilroy
- Pat Gilroy
- Tony Hanahoe
- Kevin Heffernan
- Jimmy Keaveney
- Brian Mullins
- Nathan Mullins
- Gay O'Driscoll
- Bobby Doyle
- Pat Canavan
- Tommy Conroy

=== Hurling ===
- Diarmuid Connolly
- Shane Dalton
- Noel Drumgoole
- Rónán Fallon
- Des Ferguson
- Des Foley
- Lar Foley
- Kevin Heffernan
- Tomás McGrane
- Damien Russell

== See also ==
- Dublin GAA
