= Good Counsel GAA =

Gaelic games club in County Dublin, Ireland

Good Counsel
- Muire na Dea-Chomhairle
- Founded: 1954
- County: Dublin
- Colours: Black & White
- Grounds: Drimnagh
- Coordinates: 53°20′07.83″N 6°18′25.32″W

Playing kits
Standard colours

Senior Club Championships
	All Ireland	Leinster champions	Dublin champions
Camogie:	-	-	2

Good Counsel GAA is a Gaelic Athletic Association club in County Dublin, Ireland. The club is based in Drimnagh in the south of Dublin.

== History ==
The club was formed in 1954. The club's most famous player was Kevin Moran. The club fields teams in Gaelic football, hurling and camogie to represent the South Dublin parish of Drimnagh.

The club, known locally as 'Counsel', is one of the biggest sporting clubs in the area, with approximately 800 members. There are boys and girls teams which play hurling, football and camogie from nursery up to minor level. The club is represented at intermediate hurling, senior camogie and at intermediate football level with junior teams in football, and camogie.

In March 2016, the club merged with Liffey Gaels of nearby Ballyfermot for their 2016 Junior B Hurling Campaign and would be competing as Counsel Gaels. Over the coming years, other teams from both clubs began to merge. The men's section of the club played their last match under the "Good Counsel" name on 19 November 2019 in a 4–14 to 0-12 quarter-final defeat against Lucan Sarsfields in the 2019 Dubin U21 Hurling 'C' Championship.

The Ladies' section of the club fully merged with Liffey Gaels in 2022.

The camogie section of the club continues to play under the "Good Counsel" name, fielding three teams at adult level as of 2022.

== Honours ==
- Dublin Senior Camogie Championship (2) 2002, 2004
- Dublin Junior B Hurling Championship (1) 2009
- Dublin Minor Hurling Championship
