= 2021 Dublin Senior Football Championship =

Gaelic football tournament

Tournament details
- County: Dublin
- Province: Leinster
- Year: 2021
- Trophy: Clerys Cup
- Date: 10 September 2021 - 21 November 2021
- Teams: 16 Senior 1; 16 Senior 2
- Defending champions: Ballymun Kickhams

Winners
- Champions: Kilmacud Crokes
- Qualify for: Leinster Club SFC

Runners-up
- Runners-up: St Jude's

Other
- Website: Dublin GAA.ie

The 2021 Dublin Senior Football Championship was the 135th edition of Dublin GAA's premier gaelic football tournament for senior clubs in County Dublin, Ireland. 32 teams participate (16 in Senior 1 and 16 in Senior 2), with the winner of Senior 1 representing Dublin in the Leinster Senior Club Football Championship.

Kilmacud Crokes defeated St Jude's to win the Senior 1 Championship.

St Pat's Donabate won the 2021 I.F.C. and were promoted along with I.F.C. finalists Round Towers Clondalkin to Senior 2. They replaced St Peregrines and Fingal Ravens who were relegated to the 2022 I.F.C.

Cuala won the Senior 2 Championship and were promoted along with finalists Templeogue Synge Street to Senior 1. They replaced St Oliver Plunketts and St Vincents who were relegated to the 2022 SFC2.

== Senior 1 ==
=== Group 1 ===
Team	Pld	W	D	L	PF	PA	PD	Pts
Ballyboden St. Enda's	3	2	1	0	47	34	+13	5
Na Fianna	3	2	0	1	52	40	+12	4
Raheny	3	1	1	1	49	50	-1	3
Whitehall Colmcille	3	0	0	3	35	59	-24	0

Round 1

10 September 2021 Round 1	Na Fianna	1-18 (21) – (12) 0-12	Whitehall Colmcille	Parnell Park

6 October 2021 Round 1	Ballyboden St. Enda's	2-09 (15) – (15) 1-12	Raheny	Parnell Park

Round 2

24 September 2021 Round 2	Raheny	3-14 (23) – (18) 3-09	Whitehall Colmcille	St Margarets

26 September 2021 Round 2	Ballyboden St. Enda's	1-14 (17) – (14) 0-14	Na Fianna	Parnell Park

Round 3

10 October 2021 Round 3	Raheny	0-11 (11) – (17) 0-17	Na Fianna	Parnell Park

10 September 2021 Round 3	Whitehall Colmcille	0-05 (5) – (15) 1-12	Ballyboden St. Enda's	O'Toole Park

=== Group 2 ===
Team	Pld	W	D	L	PF	PA	PD	Pts
Kilmacud Crokes	3	3	0	0	68	34	+34	6
Castleknock	3	1	0	2	52	60	-8	2
Ballinteer St John's	3	1	0	2	43	62	-19	2
St Vincents	3	1	0	2	48	55	-7	2

Round 1

12 September 2021 Round 1	Kilmacud Crokes	2-18 (24) – (15) 1-12	Castleknock	Parnell Park

12 September 2021 Round 1	St Vincents	1-17 (20) – (16) 2-10	Ballinteer St John's	O'Toole Park

Round 2

26 September 2021 Round 2	Kilmacud Crokes	1-15 (18) – (13) 2-07	St Vincents	Parnell Park

26 September 2021 Round	Castleknock	1-13 (16) – (21) 2-15	Ballinteer St John's	O'Toole Park

Round 3

9 October 2021 Round 3	Ballinteer St John's	0-06 (6) – (26) 1-23	Kilmacud Crokes	O'Toole Park

9 October 2021 Round	Castleknock	1-18 (21) – (15) 1-12	St Vincents	Naul

=== Group 3 ===
Team	Pld	W	D	L	PF	PA	PD	Pts
Ballymun Kickhams	3	2	1	0	44	40	+4	5
Thomas Davis	3	2	0	1	46	34	+12	4
Skerries Harps	3	1	1	1	36	44	-8	3
Clontarf	3	0	0	3	28	36	-8	0

Round 1

10 September 2021 Round 1	Clontarf	0-07 (7) – (11) 0-11	Skerries Harps	Lawless Park

10 September 2021 Round 1	Ballymun Kickhams	1-12 (15) – (13) 1-10	Thomas Davis	Parnell Park

Round 2

25 September 2021 Round 2	Thomas Davis	0-11 (11) – (9) 0-09	Clontarf	O'Toole Park

25 September 2021 Round 2	Skerries Harps	0-15 (15) – (15) 1-12	Ballymun Kickhams	Parnell Park

Round 3

8 October 2021 Round 3	Ballymun Kickhams	0-14 (14) – (12) 1-09	Clontarf	St Margarets

8 October 2021 Round 3	Thomas Davis	2-16 (22) – (10) 1-07	Skerries Harps	Parnell Park

=== Group 4 ===
Team	Pld	W	D	L	PF	PA	PD	Pts
Lucan Sarsfields	3	2	1	0	60	40	+20	5
St Judes	3	2	1	0	72	42	+30	5
Round Towers Lusk	3	1	0	2	46	63	-17	2
St Oliver Plunketts	3	0	0	3	46	79	-33	0

Round 1

10 September 2021 Round 1	Round Towers Lusk	3-16 (25) – (19) 0-19	St Oliver Plunketts	Naul

12 September 2021 Round 1	St Judes	1-12 (15) – (15) 1-12	Lucan Sarsfields	O'Toole Park

Round 2

25 September 2021 Round 2	Lucan Sarsfields	1-12 (15) – (14) 1-11	Round Towers Lusk	Parnell Park

26 September 2021 Round 2	St Oliver Plunketts	1-15 (18) – (26) 3-17	St Judes	O'Toole Park

Round 3

10 October 2021 Round 3	St Judes	2-23 (29) – (7) 0-07	Round Towers Lusk	Parnell Park

10 October 2021 Round 3	Lucan Sarsfields	4-16 (28) – (9) 0-09	St Oliver Plunketts	O'Toole Park

=== Quarter-finals ===
24 October 2021 Quarter Final	Kilmacud Crokes	1-11 (14) – (12) 0-12	Na Fianna	Parnell Park
		Report

24 October 2021 Quarter Final	Ballyboden St. Enda's	2-17 (23) – (14) 1-11	Castleknock	Parnell Park
		Report

23 October 2021 Quarter Final	Lucan Sarsfields	1-16 (19) – (18) 0-18	Ballymun Kickhams	Parnell Park
		Report

23 October 2021 Quarter Final	St Jude's	3-14 (23) – (15) 0-15	Thomas Davis	Parnell Park
		Report

=== Semi-finals ===
6 November 2021 Semi Final	Kilmacud Crokes	1-15 (18) – (11) 1-08	Ballyboden St. Enda's	Parnell Park
		Report		TV: RTE

6 November 2021 Semi Final	St Jude's	1-18 (21) – (14) 3-05	Lucan Sarsfields	Parnell Park
		Report		TV: RTE

=== Final ===
21 November 2021 Final	Kilmacud Crokes	1-07 (10) – (9) 1-06	St Jude's	Parnell Park
		Report		TV: RTÉ

=== Relegation play-offs ===
22 October 2021 Relegation play-off	Clontarf	2-24 (30) – (15) 1-12	St Oliver Plunketts	Garristown

22 October 2021 Relegation play-off	Whitehall Colmcille	1-12 (15) – (13) 0-13	St Vincents	St Margarets

== Senior 2 ==
=== Group 1 ===
Team	Pld	W	D	L	PF	PA	PD	Pts
St Brigid's	3	3	0	0	65	30	+35	6
St Anne's	3	2	0	1	56	46	+10	4
Ballyboughal	3	1	0	2	53	69	-16	2
Trinity Gaels	3	0	0	3	31	60	-29	0

Round 1

12 September 2021 Round 1	Ballyboughal	2-14 (20) – (24) 1-21	St Anne's

12 September 2021 Round 1	Trinity Gaels	1-05 (8) – (17) 1-14	St Brigid's

Round 2

25 September 2021 Round 2	Ballyboughal	1-17 (20) – (16) 1-13	Trinity Gaels

25 September 2021 Round 2	St Anne's	0-09 (9) – (19) 1-16	St Brigid's

Round 3

9 October 2021 Round 3	St Brigid's	5-14 (29) – (13) 1-10	Ballyboughal

9 October 2021 Round 3	St Anne's	2-17 (23) – (7) 0-07	Trinity Gaels

=== Group 2 ===
Team	Pld	W	D	L	PF	PA	PD	Pts
Cuala	3	3	0	0	76	35	+41	6
St Maurs	3	2	0	1	66	41	+25	4
Naomh Mearnóg	3	1	0	2	41	57	-16	2
St Peregrines	3	0	0	3	15	65	-50	0

Round 1

12 September 2021 Round 1	Cuala	3-11 (20) – (12) 1-09	St Maurs

12 September 2021 Round 1	Naomh Mearnóg	0-08 (8) – (4) 0-04	St Peregrines

Round 2

25 September 2021 Round 2	Cuala	4-18 (30) – (16) 1-13	Naomh Mearnóg

25 September 2021 Round	St Maurs	3-22 (31) – (4) 1-01	St Peregrines

Round 3

9 October 2021 Round 3	St Peregrines	1-04 (7) – (26) 5-11	Cuala

9 October 2021 Round	St Maurs	3-14 (23) – (17) 0-17	Naomh Mearnóg

=== Group 3 ===
Team	Pld	W	D	L	PF	PA	PD	Pts
Templeogue Synge Street	3	2	0	1	46	42	+4	4
St Sylvester's	3	2	0	1	38	38	+0	4
Erins Isle	3	1	0	2	31	37	-6	2
Fingallians	3	1	0	2	40	38	+2	2

Round 1

12 September 2021 Round 1	Erins Isle	0-10 (10) – (5) 0-05	Fingallians

12 September 2021 Round 1	Templeogue Synge Street	0-15 (15) – (9) 0-09	St Sylvester's

Round 2

25 September 2021 Round 2	Templeogue Synge Street	2-13 (17) – (13) 0-13	Erins Isle

25 September 2021 Round 2	St Sylvester's	1-13 (16) – (15) 1-12	Fingallians

Round 3

8 October 2021 Round 3	Fingallians	3-11 (20) – (12) 1-09	Templeogue Synge Street

8 October 2021 Round 3	St Sylvester's	1-10 (13) – (8) 1-05	Erins Isle

=== Group 4 ===
Team	Pld	W	D	L	PF	PA	PD	Pts
Parnells	3	3	0	0	43	39	+4	6
St Mary's	3	2	0	1	45	34	+11	4
Naomh Ólaf	3	1	0	2	42	41	+1	2
Fingal Ravens	3	0	0	3	40	56	-16	0

Round 1

12 September 2021 Round 1	Naomh Ólaf	1-09 (12) – (14) 1-11	St Mary's

12 September 2021 Round 1	Parnells	3-09 (18) – (16) 2-10	Fingal Ravens

Round 2

25 September 2021 Round 2	Fingal Ravens	0-14 (14) – (18) 1-15	Naomh Ólaf

25 September 2021 Round 2	St Mary's	0-11 (11) – (12) 1-09	Parnells

Round 3

9 October 2021 Round 3	Naomh Ólaf	2-06 (12) – (13) 1-10	Parnells

9 October 2021 Round 3	St Mary's	2-14 (20) – (10) 1-07	Fingal Ravens

=== Quarter-finals ===
24 October 2021 Quarter Final	St Sylvester's	5-08 (22) – (9) 0-09	Parnells

24 October 2021 Quarter Final	Templeogue Synge Street	0-20 (20) – (11) 0-11	St Mary's

24 October 2021 Quarter Final	Cuala	4-18 (30) – (5) 0-05	St Anne's

24 October 2021 Quarter Final	St Brigid's	1-13 (16) – (13) 0-13	St Maurs

=== Semi-finals ===
7 November 2021 Semi Final	Cuala	4-18 (30) – (18) 1-15	St Sylvester's	O'Toole Park

7 November 2021 Semi Final	Templeogue Synge Street	0-10 (10) – (9) 0-09	St Brigid's	O'Toole Park

=== Final ===
21 November 2021 Final	Cuala	1-17 (20) – (17) 2-11	Templeogue Synge Street	O'Toole Park
		Report

=== Relegation play-offs ===
22 October 2021 Relegation play-off	Fingallians	1-09 (12) – (9) 0-09	Fingal Ravens

22 October 2021 Relegation play-off	Trinity Gaels	2-20 (26) – (13) 2-07	St Peregrines
