= 2023 Dublin Senior Football Championship =

Gaelic football tournament

Tournament details
- County: Dublin
- Province: Leinster
- Year: 2023
- Trophy: Clerys Cup
- Date: 09 August 2023 - 22 October 2023
- Teams: 16 Senior 1; 16 Senior 2
- Defending champions: Kilmacud Crokes

Winners
- Champions: Kilmacud Crokes (11th win)
- Qualify for: Leinster Club SFC

Runners-up
- Runners-up: Ballyboden St Enda's

Other
- Website: Dublin GAA.ie

The 2023 Dublin Senior Football Championship was the 137th edition of Dublin GAA's premier gaelic football tournament for senior clubs in County Dublin, Ireland. 32 teams participate (16 in Senior 1 and 16 in Senior 2), with the winner of Senior 1 representing Dublin in the Leinster Senior Club Football Championship. Kilmacud Crokes defeated Ballyboden St Enda's in the 2023 final to win their third dublin title in a row.

Clontarf won the Senior 2 Championship and were promoted along with finalists Fingallians to Senior 1. They replaced Whitehall Colmcille and Templeogue Synge Street who were relegated to Senior 2.

Scoil Uí Chonaill won the Intermediate championship, and were promoted to Senior 2, along with finalists Parnells. They replaced Naomh Mearnóg and St Anne's who were relegated.

== Senior 1 ==
=== Group 1 ===
Team	Pld	W	D	L	PF	PA	PD	Pts
Ballyboden St. Enda's	3	3	0	0	65	43	+22	6
Ballymun Kickhams	3	2	0	1	41	37	+4	4
Ballinteer St John's	3	1	0	2	50	55	-5	2
Templeogue Synge Street	3	0	0	3	40	61	-21	0

Round 1

9 August 2023 Round 1	Templeogue Synge Street	4-08 (20) – (23) 3-14	Ballinteer St John's	O'Toole Park

9 August 2023 Round 1	Ballyboden St. Enda's	1-16 (19) – (14) 1-11	Ballymun Kickhams	Parnell Park

Round 2

26 August 2023 Round 2	Ballinteer St John's	1-13 (16) – (20) 1-17	Ballyboden St. Enda's	O'Toole Park

26 August 2023 Round 2	Ballymun Kickhams	1-09 (12) – (7) 0-07	Templeogue Synge Street	Parnell Park

Round 3

10 September 2023 Round 1	Ballyboden St. Enda's	3-17 (26) – (13) 2-07	Templeogue Synge Street	O'Toole Park

10 September 2023 Round 1	Ballymun Kickhams	1-12 (15) – (11) 0-11	Ballinteer St John's	Parnell Park

=== Group 2 ===
Team	Pld	W	D	L	PF	PA	PD	Pts
Kilmacud Crokes	3	3	0	0	57	45	+12	6
Castleknock	3	2	0	1	55	51	+4	4
Skerries Harps	3	1	0	2	48	58	-10	2
St Sylvester's	3	0	0	3	39	45	-6	0

Round 1

9 August 2023 Round 1	Skerries Harps	1-12 (15) – (23) 2-17	Castleknock	Parnell Park

12 August 2023 Round 1	Kilmacud Crokes	0-14 (14) – (11) 2-05	St Sylvester's	Parnell Park

Round 2

27 August 2023 Round 2	Skerries Harps	1-13 (16) – (15) 1-12	St Sylvester's	Parnell Park

27 August 2023 Round 2	Castleknock	1-14 (17) – (23) 4-11	Kilmacud Crokes	Parnell Park

Round 3

9 September 2023 Round 3	Kilmacud Crokes	1-17 (20) – (17) 0-17	Skerries Harps	Parnell Park

9 September 2023 Round 3	Castleknock	1-12 (15) – (13) 1-10	St Sylvester's	O'Toole Park

=== Group 3 ===
Team	Pld	W	D	L	PF	PA	PD	Pts
Raheny	3	2	0	1	60	35	+25	4
Thomas Davis	3	2	0	1	46	40	+6	4
Cuala	3	2	0	1	42	37	+5	4
Lucan Sarsfields	3	0	0	3	37	73	-36	0

Round 1

12 August 2023 Round 1	Thomas Davis	3-12 (21) – (12) 1-09	Lucan Sarsfields	O'Toole Park

12 August 2023 Round 1	Cuala	1-06 (9) – (13) 1-10	Raheny	O'Toole Park

Round 2

26 August 2023 Round 2	Thomas Davis	1-10 (13) – (12) 1-09	Raheny	Parnell Park

27 August 2023 Round 2	Lucan Sarsfields	0-12 (12) – (17) 0-17	Cuala	O'Toole Park

Round 3

10 September 2023 Round 3	Thomas Davis	0-12 (12) – (16) 1-13	Cuala	O'Toole Park

10 September 2023 Round 3	Lucan Sarsfields	2-07 (13) – (35) 7-14	Raheny	Parnell Park

=== Group 4 ===
Team	Pld	W	D	L	PF	PA	PD	Pts
St Judes	3	3	0	0	67	51	+16	6
St Vincents	3	2	0	1	59	45	+14	4
Na Fianna	3	1	0	2	58	51	+7	2
Whitehall Colmcille	3	0	0	3	27	64	-37	0

Round 1

11 August 2023 Round 1	St Vincents	2-11 (17) – (14) 1-11	Whitehall Colmcille	Parnell Park

12 August 2023 Round 1	Na Fianna	1-10 (13) – (17) 2-11	St Judes	Parnell Park

Round 2

26 August 2023 Round 2	Whitehall Colmcille	0-15 (15) – (25) 3-13	Na Fianna	Parnell Park

27 August 2023 Round 2	St Judes	4-11 (23) – (14) 1-11	St Vincents	O'Toole Park

Round 3

9 September 2023 Round 3	St Vincents	1-16 (19) – (18) 0-18	Na Fianna	Parnell Park

9 September 2023 Round 3	Whitehall Colmcille	1-09 (12) – (15) 1-12	St Judes	O'Toole Park

=== Knockout stages ===
Quarter-Finals		Semi-Finals		Final
Kilmacud Crokes	0-14
Ballymun Kickhams	0-10	Kilmacud Crokes	2-15 (5p)
Raheny	0-14	Raheny	2-15 (4p)
St Vincents	1-08			Kilmacud Crokes	1-14
St Judes	2-11			Ballyboden St Enda's	0-09
Cuala	2-10	Ballyboden St Enda's	3-13
Ballyboden St Enda's	1-19	St Judes	0-09
Castleknock	0-11

=== Quarter-finals ===
23 September 2023 Quarter Final	Kilmacud Crokes	0-14 (14) – (10) 0-10	Ballymun Kickhams	Parnell Park
		Report

23 September 2023 Quarter Final	Ballyboden St Enda's	1-19 (22) – (11) 0-11	Castleknock	Parnell Park
		Report

24 September 2023 Quarter Final	St Judes	2-11 (17) – (16) 2-10	Cuala	Parnell Park
		Report

24 September 2023 Quarter Final	Raheny	0-14 (14) – (11) 1-08	St Vincents	Parnell Park
		Report

=== Semi-finals ===
7 October 2023 Semi Final	Kilmacud Crokes	2-15 (21) – (21) 2-15 (5 - 4 pen)	Raheny	Parnell Park
		Report
		Penalty shootout

8 October 2023 Semi Final	Ballyboden St Enda's	3-13 (22) – (9) 0-09	St Judes	Parnell Park
		Report

=== Final ===
22 October 2023 Final	Kilmacud Crokes	1-14 (17) – (9) 0-09	Ballyboden St Enda's	Parnell Park
		Report

=== Relegation play-offs ===
Relegation play-off	Lucan Sarsfields	1-12 (15) – (13) 1-10	Whitehall Colmcille

Relegation play-off	St Sylvester's	3-13 (22) – (11) 0-11	Templeogue Synge Street

== Senior 2 ==
=== Group 1 ===
Team	Pld	W	D	L	PF	PA	PD	Pts
Naomh Barróg	3	3	0	0	64	39	+25	6
Round Towers Clondalkin	3	1	1	1	48	45	+3	3
St Maurs	3	1	0	2	46	65	-19	2
St Anne's	3	0	1	2	47	56	-9	1

Round 1

12 August 2023 Round 1	St Anne's	2-10 (16) – (16) 2-10	Round Towers Clondalkin

12 August 2023 Round 1	St Maurs	1-08 (11) – (30) 4-18	Naomh Barróg

Round 2

26 August 2023 Round 2	Naomh Barróg	1-13 (16) – (11) 2-05	St Anne's

26 August 2023 Round 2	Round Towers Clondalkin	2-09 (15) – (11) 0-11	St Maurs

Round 3

9 September 2023 Round 3	St Anne's	1-17 (20) – (24) 3-15	St Maurs

9 September 2023 Round 3	Round Towers Clondalkin	2-11 (17) – (18) 2-12	Naomh Barróg

=== Group 2 ===
Team	Pld	W	D	L	PF	PA	PD	Pts
Naomh Ólaf	3	2	0	1	43	44	-1	4
Round Towers Lusk	3	1	1	1	47	45	+2	3
St Mary's	3	1	1	1	43	42	+1	3
St Oliver Plunketts	3	1	0	2	41	43	-2	2

Round 1

12 August 2023 Round 1	St Mary's	0-14 (14) – (16) 2-10	Naomh Ólaf

12 August 2023 Round 1	St Oliver Plunketts	3-05 (14) – (18) 3-09	Round Towers Lusk

Round 2

26 August 2023 Round 2	St Mary's	1-11 (14) – (11) 2-05	St Oliver Plunketts

26 August 2023 Round 1	Naomh Ólaf	1-13 (16) – (14) 2-08	Round Towers Lusk

Round 3

9 September 2023 Round 3	Round Towers Lusk	0-15 (15) – (15) 1-12	St Mary's

9 September 2023 Round 3	Naomh Ólaf	1-08 (11) – (16) 2-10	St Oliver Plunketts

=== Group 3 ===
Team	Pld	W	D	L	PF	PA	PD	Pts
Clontarf	3	3	0	0	54	19	+35	6
Fingallians	3	2	0	1	45	27	+18	4
Ballyboughal	3	1	0	2	27	45	-18	2
Naomh Mearnóg	3	0	0	3	23	58	-35	0

Round 1

12 August 2023 Round 1	Naomh Mearnóg	0-04 (4) – (22) 2-16	Clontarf

12 August 2023 Round 1	Fingallians	2-08 (14) – (7) 0-07	Ballyboughal

Round 2

26 August 2023 Round 2	Clontarf	1-07 (10) – (7) 0-07	Fingallians

27 August 2023 Round 2	Ballyboughal	0-12 (12) – (9) 0-09	Naomh Mearnóg

Round 3

9 September 2023 Round 3	Naomh Mearnóg	1-07 (10) – (24) 1-21	Fingallians

9 September 2023 Round 1	Clontarf	4-10 (22) – (8) 1-05	Ballyboughal

=== Group 4 ===
Team	Pld	W	D	L	PF	PA	PD	Pts
St Pat's Donabate	3	2	1	0	44	26	+18	5
St Brigid's	3	2	1	0	40	33	+7	5
Fingal Ravens	3	1	0	2	50	50	0	2
Erins Isle	3	0	0	3	32	57	-25	0

Round 1

12 August 2023 Round 1	Fingal Ravens	0-13 (13) – (16) 1-13	St Pat's Donabate

12 August 2023 Round 1	Erins Isle	0-10 (10) – (15) 1-12	St Brigid's

Round 2

26 August 2023 Round 2	Fingal Ravens	– Abandoned due to injury v	Erins Isle

26 August 2023 Round 2	St Brigid's	0-07 (7) – (7) 1-04	St Pat's Donabate

6 September 2023 Round 2 Replay	Fingal Ravens	4-09 (21) – (16) 0-16	Erins Isle

Round 3

9 September 2023 Round 3	St Brigid's	1-16 (19) – (16) 2-10	Fingal Ravens

9 September 2023 Round 2	St Pat's Donabate	1-18 (21) – (6) 0-06	Erins Isle

=== Quarter-finals ===
24 September 2023 Quarter Final	Clontarf	2-07 (13) – (7) 0-07	St Brigid's

23 September 2023 Quarter Final	Naomh Barróg	2-12 (18) – (17) 1-14	Round Towers Lusk

24 September 2022 Quarter Final	Fingallians	3-14 (23) – (18) 1-15	St Pat's Donabate

24 September 2022 Quarter Final	Naomh Ólaf	2-12 (18) – (11) 1-08	Round Towers Clondalkin

=== Semi-finals ===
7 October 2023 Semi Final	Clontarf	2-10 (16) – (12) 0-12	Naomh Barróg
		Report

8 October 2023 Semi Final	Fingallians	0-14 (14) – (12) 0-12	St Brigid's
		Report

=== Final ===
12 November 2023 Final	Clontarf	0-12 (12) – (11) 1-08	Fingallians	Parnell Park
		Report

=== Relegation play-offs ===
24 September 2023 Relegation play-off	Naomh Mearnóg	1-15 (18) – (19) 0-19	Erins Isle

24 September 2023 Relegation play-off	St Anne's	0-11 (11) – (37) 6-19	St Oliver Plunketts
