= 2019 Dublin Senior Football Championship =

Gaelic football tournament

Tournament details
- County: Dublin
- Year: 2019
- Trophy: Clerys Cup
- Date: April–October 2019
- Teams: 16 Senior 1; 16 Senior 2
- Defending champions: Kilmacud Crokes

Winners
- Champions: Ballyboden St. Enda's
- Manager: Anthony Rainbow
- Captain: Ryan Basquel
- Qualify for: Leinster Club SFC

Runners-up
- Runners-up: Thomas Davis
- Manager: ???

Promotion/Relegation
- Promoted team(s): Round Towers Lusk (SF2 to SF1); Whitehall Colmcille (SF2 to SF1)
- Relegated team(s): St. Brigid's (SF1 to SF2); St. Sylvester's (SF2 to SF1); Round Towers Clondalkin (SF2 to IFC); St. Patrick's Palmerstown (SF2 to IFC)

Other
- Website: Dublin GAA.ie

The 2019 Dublin Senior Football Championship was the 133rd edition of Dublin GAA's premier gaelic football tournament for senior clubs in County Dublin, Ireland. 32 teams participate (16 in Senior 1 and 16 in Senior 2), with the winner of Senior 1 representing Dublin in the Leinster Senior Club Football Championship.

Round Towers, Lusk won the 2018 I.F.C. and were promoted to Senior 2. Thomas Davis won the Senior 2 Championship and were promoted to Senior 1.

== Senior 1 ==
=== Teams ===
Team	Division	Manager	Last win
Kilmacud Crokes	Division 1		2010
Ballyboden St. Enda's	Division 1		2015
St. Oliver Plunkett's Eoghan Ruadh	Division 1
Raheny	Division 2
St. Vincent's	Division 1		2017
Na Fianna	Division 1		2001
Skerries Harps	Division 1
Lucan Sarsfields	Division 1
St. Jude's	Division 1
St. Sylvester's	Division 2		1996
Thomas Davis	Division 1		1991
Ballinteer St. John's	Division 1
Ballymun Kickhams	Division 1		2012
Castleknock	Division 2
St. Brigid's	Division 1		2011
Clontarf	Division 2

=== Group 1 ===
Team	Pld	W	L	D	PF	PA	PD	Pts
Kilmacud Crokes	3	3	0	0	58	36	+22	6
Na Fianna	3	2	1	0	45	32	+13	4
Ballymun Kickhams	3	1	2	0	54	47	+7	2
St. Sylvesters	3	0	3	0	38	80	-42	0

Round 1

13 April 2019; 17:15	Na Fianna	3-14 - 0-9	St. Sylvesters	Parnell Park; Referee: David Sweeney (St. OP/ER); Man of the Match: Conor McHugh
13 April 2019; 17:15	Conor McHugh (0-1f) and David Lacey (0-1f, 1 '45) 1-4 each, Aaron Byrne 1-0, Glenn O'Reilly 0-2 (0-1f), Killian Deeley, Sean Caffrey, David Quinn, Odhran Ó Maoléidigh 0-1 each	Report	Micheál McCarthy 0-7 (0-6f), Alex Wright and James Walsh 0-1 each	Parnell Park; Referee: David Sweeney (St. OP/ER); Man of the Match: Conor McHugh

13 April 2019; 19:00	Kilmacud Crokes	2-12 - 0-14	Ballymun Kickhams	Parnell Park; Referee: Barry Tiernan (O'Dwyers); Man of the Match: Andrew McGowan
13 April 2019; 19:00	Paul Mannion 1-2 (1-0 pen), Stephen Williams 1-0, Andrew McGowan and Pat Burke (0-3f) 0-3 each, Callum Pearson 0-2, Cillian O'Shea and Shane Cunningham 0-1 each	Report	Dean Rock 0-7 (0-5f), Ted Furman 0-2, Alan Hubbard, Jason Whelan, Anton Swann, Liam O'Donovan, Paddy Small 0-1 each	Parnell Park; Referee: Barry Tiernan (O'Dwyers); Man of the Match: Andrew McGowan

Round 2

25 April 2019; 19:30	Ballymun Kickhams	4-20 - 2-10	St. Sylvesters	Balgriffin
25 April 2019; 19:30	Dean Rock 2-6 (1-0 pen), Paddy Small 0-6, Carl Keeley and James McCarthy 1-0 each, Jason Whelan 0-3, Liam O'Donovan 0-2	Report	Micheál McCarthy 0-6 (0-3f), Alex Wright 0-4 (0-1f), Ross Hazley and Mark Finnerty 1-0 each	Balgriffin

25 April 2019; 20:15	Kilmacud Crokes	1-12 - 0-9	Na Fianna	Parnell Park; Referee: D O'Connor (Naomh Mearnog)
25 April 2019; 20:15	Pat Burke 1-4 (0-3f), Shane Horan and Paul Mannion (0-2f) 0-2 each, Cian O'Connor, Shane Cunningham, Callum Pearson, Ciaran Russell 0-1 each	Report	Conor McHugh 0-3 (0-2f), Aaron Byrne and Michael Deegan (0-1f) 0-2 each, Killian Deeley and David Lacey 0-1 each	Parnell Park; Referee: D O'Connor (Naomh Mearnog)

Round 3

27 September 2019	Kilmacud Crokes	2-19 - 1-10	St. Sylvesters	Parnell Park; Referee: David Sweeney (St. OP/ER)
27 September 2019	Pat Burke 1-4 (0-1f), Callum Pearson 0-4, Ciaran Russell 1-0, Dan O'Brien, Shane Cunningham, Shane Horan (0-1f), Hugh Kenny 0-2 each, Cillian O'Shea, Niall O'Leary, Stephen Williams 0-1 each	Report	Alex Wright 1-3 (1-0 pen), Ross Hazley and Dan Brennan 0-2, Karl Archibald, J Whelan (0-1f), Micheál McCarthy 0-1 each	Parnell Park; Referee: David Sweeney (St. OP/ER)

27 September 2019	Na Fianna	0-13 - 0-8	Ballymun Kickhams	Parnell Park; Referee: Sean McCarthy (St Vincents)
27 September 2019	James Doran and Conor McHugh (0-3f) 0-4 each, Aaron Byrne 0-3f, Sean Caffrey and Leon Young o.p. 0-1 each	Report	Paddy Small and Dean Rock (0-2f) 0-2 each, Carl Keeley, Dillon Keating, Fiach Andrews, Jason Whelan 0-1 each	Parnell Park; Referee: Sean McCarthy (St Vincents)

=== Group 2 ===
Team	Pld	W	L	D	PF	PA	PD	Pts
Ballyboden St. Enda's	3	3	0	0	59	28	+31	6
Clontarf	3	1	2	0	46	41	+5	2
Lucan Sarsfields	3	1	2	0	46	53	-7	2
Skerries Harps	3	1	2	0	38	67	-29	2

Round 1

12 April 2019; 19:30	Lucan Sarsfields	3-14 - 1-10	Skerries Harps	Garristown; Referee: John Higgins (Na Fianna)
12 April 2019; 19:30	Brendan Gallagher 2-9 (0-7f), Brian Collopy 1-0, Donal Smith 0-1	Report	Ciaran Murphy 1-0, Mark Boylan, Kevin Gilmore, Collie Daly 0-2 each	Garristown; Referee: John Higgins (Na Fianna)

13 April 2019; 15:30	Ballyboden St. Enda's	0-11 - 0-10	Clontarf	O'Toole Park; Referee: Ronnie Malone (St Mary's Saggart)
13 April 2019; 15:30	Ryan Basquel (0-4f) and Ross McGarry (0-1f) 0-4 each, Brian Bobbett, Sean Gibbons, Alan Flood 0-1 each	Report	Kevin Lillis 0-6 (0-3f), Nathan Doran 0-2f, Kieran McKeon 0-1	O'Toole Park; Referee: Ronnie Malone (St Mary's Saggart)

Round 2

25 April 2019; 19:30	Ballyboden St. Enda's	1-19 - 1-9	Lucan Sarsfields	Monastery Road; Referee: Tony Lambe (St Vincent's)
25 April 2019; 19:30	Ryan Basquel 0-7 (0-2f), Tom Hayes 1-1, Warren Egan and Ross McGarry 0-3 each, Darren O'Reilly 0-2, MD McCauley and Alan Flood 0-1 each	Report	Brian Collopy 1-0, Brendan Gallagher 0-2f, CJ Smith 0-1	Monastery Road; Referee: Tony Lambe (St Vincent's)

25 April 2019; 18:45	Skerries Harps	2-13 - 2-12	Clontarf	Parnell Park; Referee: Dan Stynes (St Peregrine's)
25 April 2019; 18:45	Ciaran Murphy 0-8 (0-6f), Donal McIlgorm 1-1, Conan Doherty 1-0, Jack Smith, Collie Daly, Mark Boylan, Killian McGinnis 0-1 each	Report	Kevin Lillis 0-6 (0-2f), Matias Mac Donncha 2-0 (1-0 pen), Andrew Foley 0-3, Nathan Doran 0-2f, Kieran McKeon 0-1	Parnell Park; Referee: Dan Stynes (St Peregrine's)

Round 3

28 September 2019	Ballyboden St. Enda's	2-20 - 0-6	Skerries Harps	Parnell Park
28 September 2019	Ryan Basquel 1-5 (0-2f), Colm Basquel 0-5 (0-4f), Aran Waters 1-0, Ross McGarry and Warren Egan 0-3 each, Conal Keaney 0-2 (0-1f), Darragh Gogan (1 '45) and Darren O'Reilly 0-1 each	Report	Killian McGinnis 0-4 (0-1f) and Stephen Smith 0-2 (1 '45)	Parnell Park

28 September 2019	Clontarf	1-17 - 1-10	Lucan Sarsfields	O'Toole Park; Referee: Ronnie Malone (St Mary's Saggart)
28 September 2019	Kevin Lillis 1-6 (1-0 pen, 0-2f), Brian Berney 0-5 (0-2f), Andrew Foley 0-3, Kieran McKeon 0-2, Jack McCaffrey 0-1	Report	Brendan Gallagher 0-6 (0-5f), Brian Collopy 1-1 (1 '45), CJ Smith, Emmett Ó Conghaile, Mark Lavin 0-1 each	O'Toole Park; Referee: Ronnie Malone (St Mary's Saggart)

=== Group 3 ===
Team	Pld	W	L	D	PF	PA	PD	Pts
St Jude's	3	2	0	1	42	31	+11	5
Thomas Davis	3	1	1	1	35	29	+6	3
Raheny	3	1	1	1	44	44	+0	3
St. Oliver Plunkett's/ER	3	0	2	1	35	52	-17	1

Round 1

10 April 2020; 19:30	St Jude's	2-6 - 1-9	St. Oliver Plunkett's/ER	Parnell Park; Referee: Dan Stynes (St Peregrine's)
10 April 2020; 19:30	Ronan Joyce 2-1, Diarmuid McLoughlin and Niall Coakley (0-2f) 0-2 each, Tom Lahiff 0-1	Report	Bernard Brogan 1-5 (0-5f), Sean Bugler 0-2, Adam Keating and Niall Walsh 0-1 each	Parnell Park; Referee: Dan Stynes (St Peregrine's)

13 April 2020; 17:15	Raheny	1-7 - 0-10	Thomas Davis	O'Toole Park; Referee: Luke Lacey (Na Fianna)
13 April 2020; 17:15	Eoin Keogh 1-0 and Brian Fenton 0-1		Mark Nolan and Eoin Kirby (0-2f) 0-3 each	O'Toole Park; Referee: Luke Lacey (Na Fianna)

Round 2

24 April 2020; 19:30	St Jude's	2-12 - 2-5	Raheny	St Margaret's
24 April 2020; 19:30	Kevin McManamon 1-3 (0-1f), Tom Devlin 1-0, Diarmuid McLoughlin and Niall Coakley (0-1f) 0-1 each	Report	Brian Howard and Andy Carroll 1-0 each, Eoin Keogh 0-1	St Margaret's

24 April 2020; 19:30	Thomas Davis	2-11 - 0-7	St. Oliver Plunkett's/ER	12th Lock
24 April 2020; 19:30	Sean Reilly 1-1, Shane McGrath 0-2, Robbie Crilly (0-1f), Ryan Deegan, Ciaran Farrelly 0-1 each			12th Lock

Round 3

28 September 2020	St Jude's	1-9 - 0-8	Thomas Davis	O'Toole Park; Referee: Tony Lambe (St Vincent's)
28 September 2020	Diarmuid McLoughlin 1-1, Kieran Doherty and Padraic Clarke (0-2f) 0-2 each, Ronan Joyce, Niall Coakley, Kevin McManamon, David Sheehy 0-1 each	Report	Ryan Deegan 0-3 (0-1f), Eoin Kirby 0-2f, Robbie Crilly (0-1f), David Keogh, Shane McGrath 0-1 each	O'Toole Park; Referee: Tony Lambe (St Vincent's)

28 September 2020	Raheny	2-17 - 2-10	St. Oliver Plunkett's/ER	Parnell Park; Referee: Barry Tiernan (O'Dwyers)
28 September 2020	Brian Fenton 0-6, Gavin Ivory 1-3, Rutherson Real 1-1, Cian Ivers (0-1f) and Patrick Reid 0-2 each, Sean Grenham, Eoin Keogh, Brian Howard 0-1 each	Report	Gareth Smith 1-7 (1-0 pen, 0-1f), Darragh Brogan 1-0, Niall Walsh, Sean Bugler, Bernard Brogan 0-1 each	Parnell Park; Referee: Barry Tiernan (O'Dwyers)

=== Group 4 ===
Team	Pld	W	L	D	PF	PA	PD	Pts
Castleknock	3	3	0	0	53	42	+11	6
St Vincent's	3	2	1	0	56	39	+17	4
Ballinteer St John's	3	1	2	0	46	63	-17	2
St Brigid's	3	0	3	0	40	51	-11	0

Round 1

10 April 2019; 19:30	Castleknock	1-18 - 1-11	Ballinteer St John's	Monastery Road; Referee: Andrew Cummins (RT Clondalkin)
10 April 2019; 19:30	Tommy McDaniel 0-7, Seamus O'Carroll 1-2 (1-0 pen, 0-1f), Gerard McDermottroe 0-3 (0-2f), Darragh Warnock 0-2, Shane Boland, Kevin Kindlon, Ben Galvin, Ciaran Kilkenny 0-1 each	Report	Aaron Bradshaw 1-1, Aodhan Clabby 0-2f, Eoghan Fitzpatrick, Peter O'Curry, Fearghal Duffy 0-1 each	Monastery Road; Referee: Andrew Cummins (RT Clondalkin)

12 April 2019; 19:30	St Vincent's	1-14 - 1-6	St Brigid's	Lawless Park; Referee: Liam Aherne Clarke
12 April 2019; 19:30	Tomás Quinn 1-8 (1-0 pen, 0-4f), Sean Lowry, Cormac Diamond, Enda Varley, Lorcan Smyth, Joe Feeney, Adam Baxter 0-1 each	Report	Philly Ryan 1-1 (1-0 pen, 0-1f), Mark Donnelly 0-3 (0-1f), Malachy Tighe and Collie Carr 0-1 each	Lawless Park; Referee: Liam Aherne Clarke

Round 2

24 April 2019; 18:45	Castleknock	3-8 - 0-14	St Vincent's	Broomfield; Referee: D Harrington (St. Sylvester’s)
24 April 2019; 18:45	Gerard McDermottroe and Kevin Stephenson 1-1 each, Shane Boland 1-0, Tommy McDaniel 0-3 (0-1f), Seamus O'Carroll, Ciaran Kilkenny, Kevin Kindlon 0-1 each	Report	Tomás Quinn 0-5 (0-3f), Shane B. Carthy and Lorcan Smyth 0-2 each, Michael Concarr, James McCusker, Diarmuid Connolly, Cameron Diamond, Adam Baxter 0-1 each	Broomfield; Referee: D Harrington (St. Sylvester’s)

24 April 2019; 18:45	Ballinteer St John's	1-16 - 2-11	St Brigid's	O'Toole Park
24 April 2019; 18:45	Aodhan Clabby 0-9 (0-8f), Aaron Bradshaw 1-2, Eoghan Fitzpatrick and Donnacha Carey 0-2 each, Daniel O'Leary 0-1	Report	Sean Egan 1-1, Mark Donnelly (0-1f) and Philly Ryan (0-1f) 0-3 each, Cian Mullins 1-0, Malachy Tighe 0-2, Lorcan McCarthy and Collie Carr 0-1 each	O'Toole Park

Round 3

27 September 2019	St Vincent's	4-13 - 1-10	Ballinteer St John's	Monastery Road
27 September 2019	Enda Varley 2-0, Diarmuid Connolly and Tomás Quinn (1 '45) 1-1 each, Adam Baxter 0-2, Albert Martin and Sean Lowry 0-1 each	Report	Aodhan Clabby 1-0 and Aaron Bradshaw 0-1	Monastery Road

28 September 2019	Castleknock	0-15 - 1-11	St Brigid's	Blakestown Road
28 September 2019	Gerard McDermottroe 0-5, Seamus O'Carroll 0-4 (0-2f), Tommy McDaniel 0-2, Rob Shaw, Kevin Stephenson, Ben Galvin, Darragh Warnock 0-1 each	Report	Philly Ryan 1-3, Paddy Andrews 0-6 (0-3f), Malachy Tighe and Lorcan McCarthy 0-1 each	Blakestown Road

=== Quarter-finals ===
12 October 2019	St Jude's	0-11 - 0-4	St Vincent's	Parnell Park; Referee: James King (Garda)
12 October 2019	Padraic Clarke 0-4f, Kevin McManamon 0-3 (0-1f), Tom Devlin, Diarmuid McLoughlin, Ronan Joyce, Niall Coakley (0-1f) 0-1 each	Report	Gavin Burke, Tomás Quinn, Adam Baxter, Joe Feeney 0-1 each	Parnell Park; Referee: James King (Garda)

12 October 2019	Ballyboden St. Enda's	3-15 - 1-15 aet	Na Fianna	Parnell Park; Referee: Barry Tiernan (O'Dwyers)
12 October 2019	Colm Basquel 3-4 (0-1f), Ryan Basquel 0-5 (0-2f), Ross McGarry 0-3, Darragh Gogan (1 '45), Declan O'Mahony, Conal Keaney 0-1 each	Report	Conor McHugh 0-6 (0-1f), Aaron Byrne 0-5 (0-1f, 1 '45), Killian Deeley 1-0, James Doran 0-3, Niall McGovern 0-1	Parnell Park; Referee: Barry Tiernan (O'Dwyers)

13 October 2019	Kilmacud Crokes	0-16 - 0-8	Clontarf	Parnell Park; Referee: Dave Aston (Naomh Mearnóg)
13 October 2019	Paul Mannion 0-4 (0-3f), Shane Cunningham 0-3, Pat Burke (0-2f) and Callum Pearson 0-2 each, Cian O'Connor, Craig Dias, Shane Horan (0-1f), Dara Mullin, Darragh Jones 0-1 each	Report	Kieran McKeon 0-4, Kevin Lillis 0-2, Declan Monaghan (1 '45) and Ciaran Brennan 0-1 each	Parnell Park; Referee: Dave Aston (Naomh Mearnóg)

13 October 2019	Thomas Davis	3-12 - 1-17	Castleknock	Parnell Park; Referee: Gary McCormack (Naomh Barrog)
13 October 2019	Eoin Kirby 0-5 (0-2f), Ryan Deegan and Ciaran Farrelly 1-1 each, Brendan Kirby 1-0, Shane McGrath 0-3, Robbie Crilly (0-1f) and Cian Murphy 0-1 each	Report	Gerard McDermottroe 0-7 (0-2f), Tommy McDaniel 1-3 (0-1f), Ciaran Kilkenny 0-3, Rob Shaw, Shane Boland, Tom Shields, Seamus O'Carroll (1 '45) 0-1 each	Parnell Park; Referee: Gary McCormack (Naomh Barrog)

=== Semi-finals ===
26 October 2019	Ballyboden St. Enda's	2-10 - 1-10	St Jude's	Parnell Park; Referee: David Sweeney (St. OP/ER)
26 October 2019	Colm Basquel 1-4 (0-3f), Darren O'Reilly 1-1, Ryan Basquel 0-2 (0-1f), Darragh Gogan (1 '45), Declan O'Mahony, Ross McGarry 0-1 each	Report	Chris Guckian 1-0, Tom Devlin, Niall Coakley (0-1f), Kevin McManamon (0-1f) 0-3 each, Padraic Clarke 0-1f	Parnell Park; Referee: David Sweeney (St. OP/ER)

26 October 2019	Thomas Davis	2-12 - 1-10	Kilmacud Crokes	Parnell Park; Referee: Ronnie Malone (St Mary's Saggart)
26 October 2019	Eoin Kirby 0-5 (0-4f), Ciaran Farrelly 1-1, Brendan Kirby 1-0, Ryan Deegan 0-2, Cian Murphy, Shane McGrath, Oisin Kelly, Sean Reilly 0-1 each	Report	Pat Burke 1-4 (0-3f), Shane Horan 0-2 (0-1f), Andrew McGowan, Craig Dias, Callum Pearson, Dara Mullin 0-1 each	Parnell Park; Referee: Ronnie Malone (St Mary's Saggart)

=== Final ===
3 November 2019	Ballyboden St. Enda's	0-15 - 0-9	Thomas Davis	Parnell Park; Attendance: 5,183; Referee: John Higgins (Na Fianna); Man of the Match: Ryan Basquel
3 November 2019	Ryan Basquel 0-6 (0-3f), Ross McGarry 0-4, Colm Basquel 0-3 (0-2f), Declan O'Mahony and Alan Flood 0-1 each	Report	Eoin Kirby 0-4f, David Keogh 0-2, Shane McGrath, Ryan Deegan (0-1f), Eanna O'Toole 0-1 each	Parnell Park; Attendance: 5,183; Referee: John Higgins (Na Fianna); Man of the Match: Ryan Basquel

=== Relegation play-offs ===
- Skerries Harps 1-20, 1-14 St. Brigid's, St. Margaret's, 13/10/2019,
- St. Oliver Plunkett's 1-13, 2-8 St. Sylvester's, Drumnigh, 26/10/2019,

== Senior 2 ==
=== Teams ===
Team	Division	Manager
Cuala
Round Tower's, Lusk
St. Mary's, Saggart
Erin's Isle
St. Pergrine's
Round Tower's, Clondalkin
Fingallians
St. Patrick's, Palmerstown
Fingal Ravens
Parnells
Naomh Ólaf
Naomh Mearnóg
St. Anne's
Templeogue Synge Street
Whitehall Colmcille
Naomh Maur

=== Group 1 ===
Team	Pld	W	L	D	PF	PA	PD	Pts
Cuala	3	3	0	0	57	40	+17	6
Naomh Maur	3	2	1	0	57	45	+12	4
Fingallians	3	1	2	0	45	53	-8	2
Round Towers (C)	3	0	3	0	37	58	-21	0

Round 1

11 April 2019	St. Maur's	1-16 - 1-10	Round Towers Clondalkin	Balgriffin
11 April 2019	Ciaran Reddin 0-6 (0-1f), Ciaran Archer 0-4 (0-1f, 2 '45), Chris Carthy 0-3, Conor McGuire 1-0, Jack Burke 0-2, David Carthy 0-1	Report		Balgriffin

14 April 2019	Cuala	2-16 - 0-9	Fingallians	O'Toole Park
14 April 2019	Luke Keating 1-2 (0-1f), Con O'Callaghan 0-5 (0-1f), Niall O'Callaghan 1-0, Cathal Ó Giolláin 0-2, Jack Flynn and Conor Mullally 0-1 each	Report	Oisin Lynch 0-3 (0-2f) Dylan Staunton and Shane Howard 0-2 each, David Kileen 0-1	O'Toole Park

Round 2

24 April 2019	Fingallians	1-16 - 0-8	Round Towers Clondalkin	Parnell Park
24 April 2019	Paul Flynn 1-3, Oisin Lynch 0-6 (0-1f), Shane Howard 0-3, Ian O'Reilly (1 '45), Paul Graves, David Killeen, Dillon Staunton 0-1 each		Thomas Galvin 0-4 (0-3f), Ian Ward 0-2 (0-1f), Jason Joyce and Adam Doyle 0-1 each	Parnell Park

24 April 2019	Cuala	2-10 - 1-12	St. Maur's	Parnell Park
24 April 2019	Jamie Keenan 1-1 (1-0 pen), Peadar Ó Cofaigh Byrne 1-0, Conor Mullally 0-3, Darragh Spillane and Niall O'Callaghan 0-2 each, Mick Fitzsimons and Luke Keating (0-1f) 0-1 each		Ciaran Archer 0-7 (0-1f, 1 '45), Danny Byrne 1-0, Jack Burke and Chris Carthy 0-2 each, Conor McGuire 0-1	Parnell Park

Round 3

26 September 2019	St. Maur's	4-11 - 0-16	Fingallians	Donabate
26 September 2019	Ciaran Archer 2-5 (1-2f), Danny Byrne and Conor McGuire 1-1 each, Jack Burke, Eoghan Conroy, Chris Carthy, Ciaran Reddin 0-1 each	Report	Oisin Lynch 0-9 (0-3f, 1 '45), Paul Flynn 0-4, Dillon Staunton 0-2, Ian O'Reilly 0-1f	Donabate

28 September 2019	Cuala	1-16 - 1-13	Round Towers Clondalkin

=== Group 2 ===
Team	Pld	W	L	D	PF	PA	PD	Pts
Templeogue Synge Street	3	3	0	0	52	32	+20	6
Naomh Mearnóg	3	2	1	0	42	31	+11	4
St. Anne's	3	1	2	0	40	49	-9	2
Erin's Isle	3	0	3	0	30	52	-22	0

Round 1

13 April 2019	Templeogue Synge Street	0-13 - 0-8	Naomh Mearnóg	Balgriffin
13 April 2019	Niall Scully 0-5, Eoghan O'Gara 0-3, Joe Varley, Killian O'Gara, Ger Vickery, Eoin O'Donovan 0-1 each		Shane Carthy 0-5	Balgriffin

13 April 2019	St. Annes	0-17 - 1-8	Erin's Isle

Round 2

26 April 2019	Templeogue Synge Street	3-11 - 0-12	St. Annes	O'Toole Park
26 April 2019	Ger Vickery 1-1, Niall Scully and Alex O'Toole 1-0 each, Eoghan O'Gara 0-3, Killian O'Gara 0-1	Report	Scott Fulham 0-2	O'Toole Park

26 April 2019	Naomh Mearnóg	0-16 - 0-7	Erin's Isle

Round 3

26 September 2019	Naomh Mearnóg	2-12 - 1-8	St. Annes	St Margarets; Referee: Derek McKitterick
26 September 2019	Jamie Walsh 1-3, Karl Lynch Bissett 1-1, Shane Carthy and Alan Doyle 0-4 each	Report		St Margarets; Referee: Derek McKitterick

27 September 2019	Templeogue Synge Street	1-16 - 0-12	Erin's Isle
27 September 2019	Eoghan O'Gara 1-0

=== Group 3 ===
Team	Pld	W	L	D	PF	PA	PD	Pts
Round Tower's (L)	3	3	0	0	73	36	+37	6
Whitehall Colmcille	3	2	1	0	77	43	+34	4
Naomh Olaf	3	1	2	0	45	55	-10	2
St. Patrick's (P)	3	0	3	0	26	87	-61	0

Round 1

13 April 2019	Round Towers Lusk	4-18 - 0-6	St. Patrick's Palmerstown	St Margaret's
13 April 2019	Cormac Howley 1-5, Stephen Harford 2-1, Kieran McKitterick 0-7, Darragh Kelly 1-0, Luke White 0-2, Liam Bohan, James Hanratty, Kyle Connell 0-1 each			St Margaret's

14 April 2019	Whitehall Colmcille	2-13 - 1-13	Naomh Ólaf	O'Toole Park
14 April 2019	Cormac Costello 1-8 (0-6f), Lee Gannon 1-0, John Bridgeman 0-2, Eoghan O'Donnell and Keith Campbell 0-1 each	Report	Tom Keane 1-5 (0-2f)	O'Toole Park

Round 2

25 April 2019	Naomh Ólaf	0-13 - 1-7	St. Patrick's Palmerstown

25 April 2019	Round Towers Lusk	1-14 - 0-14	Whitehall Colmcille

Round 3

28 September 2019	Round Towers Lusk	3-17 - 0-16	Naomh Ólaf	Balgriffin; Referee: Derek McKitterick
28 September 2019	Cormac Howley 1-6, Darragh Kelly and James Hanratty 1-0 each, Liam Bohan 0-6, Luke Caul, Adam Caul, Jack Hussey, Chris Tonge, Chris Neville 0-1 each		David Byrne 0-2	Balgriffin; Referee: Derek McKitterick

28 September 2019	Whitehall Colmcille	4-23 - 0-10	St. Patrick's Palmerstown
28 September 2019	Cormac Costello 0-9 (0-4f, 1 '45), Lee Gannon 1-3, John Bridgeman 0-6, Niall O'Donnell 1-1, Hugh McInerney 1-0, Tony O'Sullivan 0-2, Keith Campbell and Kevin O'Donoghue 0-1 each

=== Group 4 ===
Team	Pld	W	L	D	PF	PA	PD	Pts
Fingal Ravens	3	2	1	0	43	37	+6	4
St. Mary's (S)	3	2	1	0	43	30	+13	4
St. Peregrine's	3	1	2	0	40	49	-9	2
Parnells	3	1	2	0	43	53	-10	2

Round 1

11 April 2019	Fingal Ravens	2-12 - 0-9	St. Peregrine's

11 April 2019	St. Mary's Saggart	1-15 - 1-6	Parnells	Parnell Park
11 April 2019	Blaine Kelly 0-7 (0-3f), James Timmons 1-4 (0-3f), Alex Darcy, Peter Doyle, Carl Finn, Rhys Butler 0-1 each	Report	Darragh Joyce 1-2 (0-2f)	Parnell Park

Round 2

26 April 2019	St. Peregrine's	3-13 - 2-10	Parnells
26 April 2019	Ciaran McGuinness 1-5 (0-5f), Conor Hynes 1-3, Christian O'Hara 1-0

26 April 2019	Fingal Ravens	1-9 - 0-10	St. Mary's Saggart
26 April 2019	Caomhin O'Scanaill 1-0, Barry Caulfield 0-3		Blaine Kelly 0-8 (0-3f), Adam Brady and Peter Doyle 0-1 each

Round 3

26 September 2019	St. Mary's Saggart	1-12 - 0-9	St. Peregrine's

27 September 2019	Parnells	2-12 - 2-7	Fingal Ravens
27 September 2019			Derrick Daly and James O'Donnell 1-1 each

=== Senior 2 Football Championship Knock-Out Stage ===
==== Last Eight ====
Quarter-Finals		Semi-Finals		Final
Round Towers Lusk	1-19
St. Mary's Saggart	2-10	Round Towers Lusk	1-13
Cuala	4-12	Cuala	0-15
Naomh Mearnóg	1-11			Round Towers Lusk	3-21
Templeogue Synge St.	5-10			Whitehall Colmcille	3-10
St. Maur's	3-8	Whitehall Colmcille	1-16
Whitehall Colmcille	5-13	Templeogue Synge St.	0-6
Fingal Ravens	0-14

=== Quarter-finals ===
12 October 2019	Round Towers Lusk	1-19 - 2-10	St. Mary's Saggart	O'Toole Park; Referee: David Sweeney (St. OP/ER)
12 October 2019	Cormac Howley 0-9, Liam Bohan 0-8, Kyle Connell 1-0		Ciaran Howard and Blaine Kelly (1-0 pen) 1-0 each, Jack Maguire and Eoin Murray 0-1 each	O'Toole Park; Referee: David Sweeney (St. OP/ER)

12 October 2019	Whithall Colmcille	5-13 - 0-14	Fingal Ravens	O'Toole Park; Referee: Ciaran Reilly (Na Fianna)
12 October 2019	Cormac Costello 1-5, Lee Gannon 1-3, Niall O'Donnell, Eoghan O'Donnell, John Bridgeman 1-0 each, Enda O'Donnell 0-3, Sean Moran 0-1			O'Toole Park; Referee: Ciaran Reilly (Na Fianna)

13 October 2019	Templeogue Synge Street	5-10 - 3-8	St. Maur's	O'Toole Park; Referee: Seamus Farrelly (Ballinteer St John's)
13 October 2019	Killian O'Gara 2-1, Ger Vickery 2-0, Niall Scully 1-2 (0-1f)	Report	Chris Carthy 1-1 (0-1f), Tom O'Neill and Conor McGuire 1-0 each, Ciaran Archer 0-3 (0-1f), Mark McGrath, Jack Burke, David Carthy, Ciaran Reddin 0-1 each	O'Toole Park; Referee: Seamus Farrelly (Ballinteer St John's)

13 October 2019	Cuala	4-12 - 1-11	Naomh Mearnóg	O'Toole Park; Referee: Liam Aherne Clarke (Ballyboughal)
13 October 2019	Niall O'Callaghan 2-1, Con O'Callaghan 1-1, Jamie Keenan and Cathal O'Giollain 0-1 each	Report	Shane Carthy 0-3, Mark Phelan 1-0, Niall Murphy, Jamie Walsh, Sean Hawkshaw 0-1 each	O'Toole Park; Referee: Liam Aherne Clarke (Ballyboughal)

=== Semifinals ===
26 October 2019	Whitehall Colmcille	1-16 - 0-6	Templeogue Synge Street	O'Toole Park; Referee: Philip Fitzsimons (Liffey Gaels)
26 October 2019	Cormac Costello 1-11 (0-6f, 1 sl), Sean Moran, Tony O'Sullivan, Lee Gannon, John Bridgeman, Dan Redmond 0-1 each		Eoghan O'Gara 0-2, Killian O'Gara, Ger Vickery, Niall Scully (0-1f), Luke O'Brien 0-1 each	O'Toole Park; Referee: Philip Fitzsimons (Liffey Gaels)

26 October 2019	Round Towers Lusk	1-13 - 0-15	Cuala	O'Toole Park; Referee: Ciaran Reilly (Na Fianna)
26 October 2019	Cormac Howley 0-6 (0-2f), Darragh Kelly 1-0, Liam Bohan 0-3 (0-1f, 1 '45)	Report	Jamie Keenan 0-7	O'Toole Park; Referee: Ciaran Reilly (Na Fianna)

=== Final ===
3 November 2019	Round Towers Lusk	3-21 - 3-10	Whitehall Colmcille	Parnell Park; Referee: Ciaran Reilly (Na Fianna)
3 November 2019	Liam Bohan 0-8 (0-4f), Luke White 1-2, Kyle Connell 1-1, Cormac Howley 0-4 (0-2f), Darragh Kelly 1-0, James Hanratty 0-3, Adam Caul 0-2, Aaron Duffy 0-1	Report	Cormac Costello 1-8 (0-7f, 1 '45), Eoghan O'Donnell 1-1, Keith Campbell 1-0, Niall O'Connor 0-1	Parnell Park; Referee: Ciaran Reilly (Na Fianna)

=== Relegation play-offs ===
- Parnells 0-13, 1-8 St. Patrick's Palmerstown, Garristown, 13/10/2019, (AET)
- Erin's Isle 2-11, 0-14 Round Towers Clondalkin, Bohernabreena, 13/10/2019,
