= 2018 Dublin Senior Football Championship =

Tournament details
- County: Dublin
- Year: 2018
- Trophy: Clerys Cup
- Date: 12 April - 29 October 2018
- Teams: 16 Senior 1; 15 Senior 2
- Defending champions: St. Vincent's

Winners
- Champions: Kilmacud Crokes
- Manager: Johnny Magee
- Captain: Craig Dias
- Qualify for: Leinster Club SFC

Runners-up
- Runners-up: St. Judes
- Manager: ???

Promotion/Relegation
- Relegated team(s): Parnells (SF1 to SF2)

Other
- Website: Dublin GAA.ie

The 2018 Dublin Senior Football Championship was the 132nd edition of Dublin GAA's premier Gaelic football tournament for senior clubs in County Dublin, Ireland. 31 teams participate (16 in Senior 1 and 15 in Senior 2), with the winner of Senior 1 representing Dublin in the Leinster Senior Club Football Championship. The draw for the group stages of the championship were made on 21 March 2018.

No team was promoted from the 2017 I.F.C. due to the rule that no reserve side who wins the I.F.C. (in this case Na Fianna 'B') can be promoted to the S.F.C.

St. Vincent's were the defending champions having defeated Ballymun Kickhams in the previous year's final.

== Team changes ==
The following teams have changed division since the 2017 championship season.

=== To S.F.C. ===
Promoted from 2017 Dublin Intermediate Football Championship

- None - (no reserve side who wins the I.F.C. [in this case Na Fianna 'B] can be promoted to the S.F.C.)

=== From S.F.C. ===
Relegated to 2018 Dublin Intermediate Football Championship

- None - (no senior side is relegated once a reserve side wins the I.F.C.)

Withdrew from Dublin Championships

- U.C.D.

== Format changes for 2018 ==
In 2018 the Dublin S.F.C. moved away from the straight knock-out format used in previous years. The championship was split into two sections called the Senior 1 and Senior 2 Football Championships. Teams were graded as Senior 1 or 2 depending on their performances in the previous five Dublin S.F.C.s.

=== Senior 1 Football Championship ===
16 teams compete in 4 randomly drawn groups of 4. The top 2 teams in each group qualify for the S.1.F.C. Quarter-Finals, with the outright winner of the S.1.F.C. representing Dublin in the Leinster S.C.F.C. The bottom teams in each of the four groups contest the relegation play-offs with the losers of the relegation final being relegated to the 2019 S.2.F.C.

=== Senior 2 Football Championship ===
15 teams compete in 3 randomly drawn groups of 4 and 1 group of 3 (due to the withdrawal of U.C.D. from the Dublin Championships). The top 2 teams in each group qualify for the S.2.F.C. Quarter-Finals, with the outright winner of the S.2.F.C. winning promotion to the 2019 Dublin S.1.F.C. The bottom teams in each of the four groups contest the relegation play-offs with the losers of the relegation final being relegated to the 2019 I.F.C.

=== Intermediate Football Championship ===
All reserve sides who played in previous I.F.C.'s will now compete in a separate competition among themselves known as the "All-County Intermediate Football Championship" (A.C.I.F.C.). All 16 first-teams compete in a separate championship in 4 randomly drawn groups of 4. The top 2 teams in each group qualify for the I.F.C. Quarter-Finals, with the outright winner of the I.F.C. winning promotion to the 2019 Dublin S.2.F.C. The bottom teams in each of the four groups contest the relegation play-offs with the losers of the relegation final being relegated to the 2019 Junior Football 1 Championship.

=== Junior 1 Football Championship ===
All reserve sides who played in previous J.F.C.'s will now compete in a separate competition among themselves known as the "All-County Junior 1 Football Championship" (A.C.J.1.F.C.). All 16 first-teams compete in a separate championship in 4 randomly drawn groups of 4. The top 2 teams in each group qualify for the J.1.F.C. Quarter-Finals, with the outright winner of the J.1.F.C. winning promotion to the 2019 Dublin I.F.C. The bottom teams in each of the forum groups contest the relegation play-offs with the losers of the relegation final being relegated to the 2019 J.2.F.C.

== Senior 1 Football Championship ==
=== Group A ===
Team	Pld	W	L	D	PF	PA	PD	Pts
Kilmacud Crokes	3	3	0	0	49	35	+14	6
Ballyboden St. Enda's	3	1	1	1	45	46	-1	3
Raheny	3	1	2	0	33	39	-6	2
St. Oliver Plunkett's/ER	3	0	2	1	44	51	-7	1

Round 1

13 April 2018; 19:00	Raheny	3-8 - 0-14	St. Oliver Plunkett's/ER	Garristown; Referee: Dave Aston (Naomh Mearnóg); Man of the Match: Rutherson Real
13 April 2018; 19:00	Gavin Ivory (1-0 pen), Aran Kelly, Sean McCarthy 1-0 each, Michael Grenham 0-3 (0-1f), Brian Fenton 0-2, Brian Howard, Simon Deignan, Eoghan Keogh 0-1 each	Report	Sean Bugler 0-5, Gareth Smith 0-3 (0-2f, 1 '45), Tomás Corrigan 0-2, Niall Walsh, Darragh Brogan, Alan Brogan, Declan Lally 0-1 each	Garristown; Referee: Dave Aston (Naomh Mearnóg); Man of the Match: Rutherson Real

14 April 2018; 17:45	Kilmacud Crokes	3-12 - 1-11	Ballyboden St. Enda's	Parnell Park; Referee: Gary McCormack (Naomh Barrog); Man of the Match: Mo Leahey
14 April 2018; 17:45	Shane Horan 2-1, Callum Pearson 1-2, Paul Mannion 0-3 (0-2f), Cian O'Connor 0-2, Conor Casey, Craig Dias, Pat Burke (0-1f), Dan O'Brien 0-1 each		James Madden 1-2, Ryan Basquel 0-4 (0-2f), Colm Basquel 0-3 (0-2f), Darren O'Reilly and Conal Keaney 0-1 each	Parnell Park; Referee: Gary McCormack (Naomh Barrog); Man of the Match: Mo Leahey

Round 2

26 April 2018; 18:45	Ballyboden St. Enda's	4-6 - 1-9	Raheny	Parnell Park; Referee: David O'Connor (Naomh Mearnog)
26 April 2018; 18:45	Ryan Basquel 1-2, Alan Flood 1-1, Darren O'Reilly and Colm Basquel 1-0, James Madden 0-2, Cathal Flaherty 0-1	Report	Aran Kelly 1-1, Gavin Ivory 0-3 (0-1f, 1 '45), Eoin Keogh 0-2, Sean McMahon, Brian Fenton. James Keane (0-1f) 0-1 each	Parnell Park; Referee: David O'Connor (Naomh Mearnog)

26 April 2018; 20:15	Kilmacud Crokes	2-15 - 0-17	St. Oliver Plunkett's/ER	Parnell Park; Referee: Seamus Farrelly (Ballinteer St. John's)
26 April 2018; 20:15	Shane Horan 2-1, Paul Mannion 0-5 (0-3f), Pat Burke 0-3 (0-1f), Cian O'Connor (0-1f) and Shane Cunningham 0-2 each, Tom Fox and Dan O'Brien 0-1 each	Report	Gareth Smith 0-5 (0-4f, 1 '45), Sean Bugler 0-4, Tomas Corrigan 0-3, Niall Walsh 0-2, Ross McConnell, Darragh Brogan, Leigh Herron 0-1 each	Parnell Park; Referee: Seamus Farrelly (Ballinteer St. John's)

Round 3

14 September 2018	Kilmacud Crokes	0-7 - 0-4	Raheny	Balgriffin; Referee: ??? Man of the Match: ???

14 September 2018	St. Oliver Plunkett's/ER	2-7 0-13	Ballyboden St. Enda's	Parnell Park; Referee: ??? Man of the Match: ???

=== Group B ===
Team	Pld	W	L	D	PF	PA	PD	Pts
St. Vincents	3	3	0	0	86	46	+40	6
Na Fianna	3	1	1	1	54	51	+3	3
Skerries Harps	3	0	1	2	42	63	-21	2
Lucan Sarsfields	3	0	2	1	41	63	-22	1

Round 1

12 April 2018; 16:45	St. Vincents	5-18 - 1-9	Skerries Harps	Parnell Park; Referee: Darragh Sheppard (Round Towers Lusk); Man of the Match: ???
12 April 2018; 16:45	Cormac Diamond 2-3, Tomás Quinn 2-2 (0-1f), Shane B. Carthy 1-3 (0-2f), Enda Varley 0-4, Gavin Burke 0-3, Ger Brennan, Lorcan Galvin, Lorcan Smyth 0-1 each	Report	Harry Dawson 1-2 (1-0pen, 0-2f), Kevin Gilmore and Stephen Smith 0-2 each, Bryan Cullen, Gerry Daly, Shane Hickey 0-1 each	Parnell Park; Referee: Darragh Sheppard (Round Towers Lusk); Man of the Match: ???

12 April 2018; 18:15	Na Fianna	3-9 - 1-10	Lucan Sarsfields	Parnell Park; Referee: Barry Tiernan (O'Dwyers); Man of the Match: ???
12 April 2018; 18:15	Sean Caffrey 1-3, Glenn O'Reilly 0-5 (0-2f), Darragh Kennedy and Conor McHugh 1-0 each, Aaron Byrne 0-1	Report	Connor Gallagher 0-4 (0-2f), Brendan Gallagher 0-3, Harry Ladd 1-0, Darren Gavin 0-2, John McCormack 0-1	Parnell Park; Referee: Barry Tiernan (O'Dwyers); Man of the Match: ???

Round 2

27 April 2018; 19:15	Lucan Sarsfields	1-12 - 1-12	Skerries Harps	St. Margarets; Referee: David Sweeney; Man of the Match: ???

28 April 2018; 17:45	St. Vincents	2-17 - 2-15	Na Fianna	Parnell Park; Referee: Darragh Sheppard (Round Towers Lusk); Man of the Match: ???
28 April 2018; 17:45	Enda Varley 1-8 (0-2f), Tomás Quinn 1-4 (0-4f), Lorcan Smyth 0-3, Nathan Mullins and Shane B. Carthy 0-1 each,	Report	Conor McHugh 1-4 (0-1f), Glen O'Reilly 0-6 (0-3f), Sean Caffrey 1-0, James Doran and Michael Deegan 0-2 each, Eoin Murchan 0-1	Parnell Park; Referee: Darragh Sheppard (Round Towers Lusk); Man of the Match: ???

Round 3

15 September 2018	St. Vincent's	4-18 - 2-7	Lucan Sarsfields	O'Toole Park; Referee: ??? Man of the Match: ???

15 September 2018	Na Fianna	1-12 - 1-12	Skerries Harps	Parnell Park; Referee: ??? Man of the Match: ???

=== Group 3 ===
Team	Pld	W	L	D	PF	PA	PD	Pts
St. Jude's	3	3	0	0	55	35	+20	6
St. Sylvesters	3	2	1	0	59	36	+23	4
Ballinteer St. John's	3	1	2	0	48	43	+5	2
Parnells	3	0	3	0	21	69	-48	0

Round 1

13 April 2018; 19:00	St. Sylvesters	0-19 - 0-6	Parnells	Balgriffin; Referee: David Sweeney (St. OP/ER); Man of the Match: ???
13 April 2018; 19:00	Michael McCarthy 0-8 (0-4f), Edmund Walsh 0-7 (0-2f), Jack Hazley 0-2, Ciaran Charlton and Jamie Kennedy 0-1 each	Report	Stephen Cluxton (0-2f) and Jamie Sammon (0-1f) 0-2 each, Stephen Duffy and John Sammon 0-1 each	Balgriffin; Referee: David Sweeney (St. OP/ER); Man of the Match: ???

14 April 2018; 16:00	St. Jude's	0-20 - 0-8	Ballinteer St. John's	O'Toole Park; Referee: Willy O'Connor (Clontarf); Man of the Match: ???
14 April 2018; 16:00	Kevin McManamon 0-6, Niall Coakley 0-5 (0-1f), Paul Cunningham 0-3, Tom Lahiff, Mark Sweeney, Colm Murphy, Chris Guckian, Tom Devlin, Declan Donnelly 0-1 each	Report	Fearghal Duffy 0-4 (0-3f), Nicky Devereux, Glenn Whelan, Robbie Gaughan, Aodhán Clabby (0-1f) 0-1 each	O'Toole Park; Referee: Willy O'Connor (Clontarf); Man of the Match: ???

Round 2

28 April 2018; 16:00	St. Jude's	1-22 - 0-8	Parnells	O'Toole Park; Referee: Seamus Farrelly (Ballinteer St. John's); Man of the Match: ???
28 April 2018; 16:00	Niall Coakley 0-6 (0-2f), Neal Mangan 1-1, Kevin McManamon 0-3 (0-2f), Mark Sweeney, Simon King, Enda Dalton, Ronan Joyce 0-2 each, Tom Lahiff, Seamus Ryan, Tom Devlin, Kieran Doherty 0-1 each		Stephen Cluxton 0-3 (0-2f, 1 '45), John Dignam (0-1f) and Stephen Duffy 0-2 each, L Fahy 0-1	O'Toole Park; Referee: Seamus Farrelly (Ballinteer St. John's); Man of the Match: ???

28 April 2018; 17:45	St. Sylvesters	0-16 - 2-9	Ballinteer St. John's	O'Toole Park; Referee: Tony Lambe (St. Vincents)
28 April 2018; 17:45	Michael McCarthy 0-8 (0-1f), Edmund Walsh 0-5 (0-1f), Jack Hazley, Glen Hazley, Alex Wright 0-1 each		Fearghal Duffy 1-2 (0-2f), Sam Tully 0-3, Luke Naughton 1-0, Aaron Bradshaw 0-2, Eoin Fitzpatrick and Shane McCann 0-1 each	O'Toole Park; Referee: Tony Lambe (St. Vincents)

Round 3

16 September 2018	St. Sylvester's	2-14 - 1-11	St. Jude's	Parnell Park; Referee: ??? Man of the Match: ???

16 September 2018	Ballinteer St. John's	2-19 - 0-7	Parnells	O'Toole Park; Referee: ??? Man of the Match: ???

=== Group D ===
Team	Pld	W	L	D	PF	PA	PD	Pts
Ballymun Kickhams	3	3	0	0	68	38	+30	6
Castleknock	3	2	1	0	60	35	+25	4
St. Brigid's	3	1	2	0	42	48	-6	2
Clontarf	3	0	3	0	28	77	-49	0

Round 1

14 April 2018; 16:00	Ballymun Kickhams	2-13 - 1-10	St. Brigid's	Parnell Park; Referee: James King (Garda); Man of the Match: ???
14 April 2018; 16:00	Dean Rock 1-10 (0-6f, 1 '45), Conor Kavanagh 1-0, Fiach Andrews, Liam O'Donovan, Ted Furman 0-1 each	Report	Philly Ryan 1-2 (1-0 pen, 0-2f), Lorcan McCarthy 0-4 (0-1f, 2 '45), Paddy Andrews 0-2, Gavin Kane and Patrick Maguire 0-1 each	Parnell Park; Referee: James King (Garda); Man of the Match: ???

14 April 2018; 17:45	Castleknock	2-19 - 0-9	Clontarf	O'Toole Park; Referee: Seamus Farrelly (Ballinteer St. John's); Man of the Match: ???
14 April 2018; 17:45	Seamus O'Carroll 2-3 (1 '45), Ciaran Kilkenny 0-8 (0-3f), Mikey Galvin 0-3, Kevin Kindlon 0-2, Shane Boland, Ben Galvin, Tommy McDaniel 0-1 each	Report	Kevin Lillis (0-1f) and Joe McDonagh 0-3 each, Liam Howley, Patrick Mohan, Maitias MacDonncha (0-1f) 0-1 each	O'Toole Park; Referee: Seamus Farrelly (Ballinteer St. John's); Man of the Match: ???

Round 2

27 April 2018; 19:15	Ballymun Kickhams	4-18 - 1-6	Clontarf	Balgriffin; Referee: Barry Tiernan (O’Dwyers); Man of the Match: ???
27 April 2018; 19:15	Ted Furman 1-6 (0-2f), Paddy Small 0-5 (0-1f), Leon Young 1-1, Carl Keeley and Conor Kavanagh 1-0 each, Fiach Andrews 0-3, Jason Whelan 0-2, Evan Comerford 0-1 (1 '45)		Kevin Lillis 1-2 (0-1f), Patrick Broin, Patrick Mohan, Craig McConnell, Conor McGinn 0-1 each	Balgriffin; Referee: Barry Tiernan (O’Dwyers); Man of the Match: ???

28 April 2018; 16:00	Castleknock	1-16 - 0-7	St. Brigid's	Parnell Park; Referee: Dave Feeney (Parnells); Man of the Match: ???
28 April 2018; 16:00	Ciaran Kilkenny 1-4 (0-1f), Rob Shaw 0-4, Tommy McDaniel and John Kindlon 0-2 each, Kevin Kindlon, Ben Galvin, Mickey Galvin, James Sherry 0-1 each	Report	Lorcan McCarthy 0-6f and John O'Loughlin 0-1	Parnell Park; Referee: Dave Feeney (Parnells); Man of the Match: ???

Round 3

16 September 2018	Ballymun Kickhams	2-13 - 1-13	Castleknock	Parnell Park; Referee: ??? Man of the Match: ???

16 September 2018	St. Brigid's	2-16 - 0-10	Clontarf	O'Toole Park; Referee: ??? Man of the Match: ???

=== Senior 1 Football Championship Knock-Out Stage ===
==== Last Eight ====
Quarter-Finals		Semi-Finals		Final
Kilmacud Crokes	2-17
St Sylvesters	0-15	Kilmacud Crokes	2-09
Ballyboden St. Endas	3-13	Ballyboden St Endas	0-9
Na Fianna	0-15			Kilmacud Crokes	2-12
Ballymun Kickhams	1-11			St Judes	0-13
St Judes	2-09	St Judes	2-11
St Vincents	1-21	St Vincents	0-08
Castleknock	1-09

==== Quarter-finals ====
St. Jude's, St. Sylvester's, Kilmacud Crokes, St. Vincent's, Na Fianna, Castleknock, Ballymun and Ballyboden qualified for the last eight of the Dublin Senior Football Championship.

29 September 2018; 4:00pm Quarter Final	St. Judes	2-09 - 1-11	Ballymun Kickhams	Parnell Park; Referee: B Tiernan (O’Dwyer’s). Man of the Match: ???
29 September 2018; 4:00pm Quarter Final	N Coakley 1-4 (0-3f), C Guckian 1-0, T Lahiff, P Clarke (0-2f) 0-2 each, K Doherty 0-1.		D Rock 1-7 (1-0 pen, 0-3f), P Small 0-2, C Keeley, T Furman 0-1 each.	Parnell Park; Referee: B Tiernan (O’Dwyer’s). Man of the Match: ???

29 September 2018; 5:45pm	Ballyboden St. Endas	3-13 - 0-15	Na Fianna	Parnell Park; Referee: S Farrelly (Ballinteer St John’s). Man of the Match: ???
29 September 2018; 5:45pm	R Basquel 2-5 (1-0 pen, 0-1f), C Basquel 1-2, C Keaney 0-3, R McDaid, D O’Reilly, A Waters 0-1 each.		C McHugh 0-7 (0-4f), M Deegan 0-5 (0-3f), S Caffrey, G O’Reilly, J Doran 0-1 each.	Parnell Park; Referee: S Farrelly (Ballinteer St John’s). Man of the Match: ???

30 September 2018; 2.15pm Quarter Final	St. Sylvesters	0-15 - 2-17	Kilmacud Crokes	Parnell Park; Referee: J. King (Garda); Man of the Match: ???
30 September 2018; 2.15pm Quarter Final	E Walsh 0-7 (0-3f, 0-1 ‘45’), M McCarthy 0-6 (0-1f), J Hazley 0-2.		C Pearson 1-3, P Mannion 1-2 (1-0 pen), S Cunningham 0-4, P Burke (0-2f), S Horan 0-2 each, C O’Connor 0-1 (‘45’), A McGowan, C Dias, S Williams 0-1 each.	Parnell Park; Referee: J. King (Garda); Man of the Match: ???

30 September 2018; 4.00pm Quarter Final	St. Vincents	1-21 - 1-09	Castleknock	Parnell Park; Referee: ??? Man of the Match: ???
30 September 2018; 4.00pm Quarter Final	T Quinn 1-6 (0-4f), E Varley, E Fennell, C Diamond 0-3 each, S Carthy 0-2, N Mullins, G Burke, L Smyth, A Baxter 0-1 each.		T McDaniel 1-4 (0-1f), K Kindlon 0-2, B Galvin, S O’Carroll (f), C Kilkenny 0-1 each.	Parnell Park; Referee: ??? Man of the Match: ???

==== Semi-finals ====
13 October 2018	Kilmacud Crokes	2-09 - 0-09	Ballyboden St Endas	Parnell Park; Referee: Darragh Sheppard

14 October 2018; Semi Final	St. Jude's	2-11 - 0-08	St. Vincent's	Parnell Park; Referee: ??? Man of the Match: ???

==== Final ====
29 October 2018; 5.15; Final	Kilmacud Crokes	2-12 - 0-13	St. Jude's	Parnell Park; Referee: Sean McCarthy(St. Vincents); Man of the Match: Paul Mannion
29 October 2018; 5.15; Final	Cian O'Connor (0-02, 0-01 45), Craig Dias (0-02), Shane Cunningham (0-01), Callum Pearson (0-01) Paul Mannion (1-06), Pat Burke (1-00).	https://www.rte.ie/sport/gaa/2018/1029/1007401-mannion-masterclass-fires-kilmacud-to-dublin-glory/	Tom Lahiff (0-01), Chris Guckian (0-01); Seamus Ryan (0-01); Niall Coakley (0-04, 0-04f), Kevin McManamon (0-02), Padraic Clarke (0-03, 0-01f), Tom Devlin (0-01).	Parnell Park; Referee: Sean McCarthy(St. Vincents); Man of the Match: Paul Mannion

=== Senior 1 Football Championship Relegation Playoffs ===
==== Relegation Semi-Finals ====
The relegation semi finals were cancelled as Parnells conceded relegation to the Senior 2 Football Championship for 2019. Clontarf, St. Oliver Plunkett's Eoghan Ruadh and Lucan Sarsfields retained their Senior 1 status and will compete in the 2019 Senior 1 Football Championship.

St. Oliver Plunkett's/ER	Cancelled	Clontarf

Lucan Sarsfields	Cancelled	Parnells

== Senior 2 Football Championship ==
=== Group A ===
Team	Pld	W	L	D	PF	PA	PD	Pts
Thomas Davis	3	3	0	0	73	29	+44	6
St. Mary's Saggart	3	2	1	0	46	42	+4	4
Erin's Isle	2	0	2	0	31	51	-20	0
St. Peregrine's	2	0	2	0	17	45	-28	0

Round 1

13 April 2018; 19:00	Thomas Davis	4-16 - 1-9	St. Peregrine's	St Margarets; Referee: Finbarr Shanahan (St Margarets)
13 April 2018; 19:00	Eoin Kirby 3-3, Chris Sallier 1-5, Ciaran Farrelly 0-3, Mark Nolan 0-2, Daithi Ryan 0-1	Report	Conor Hynes 1-0, Eric Lowndes and Shane Sweeney 0-1 each	St Margarets; Referee: Finbarr Shanahan (St Margarets)

24 April 2018; 19:00	St. Mary's Saggart	2-7 - 1-7	Erin's Isle	Balgriffin; Referee: Dave O'Donovan (St Marks)

Round 2

28 April 2018; 18:00	Thomas Davis	1-10 - 0-10	St. Mary's Saggart	Newcastle; Referee: Brendan Carroll (Fingal Ravens)

??? 2018; 18:00	St. Peregrine's	-vs-	Erin's Isle	Naul; Referee: Seán McCarthy (St. Vincents)

Round 3

15 September 2018	St. Mary's Saggart	4-11 - 0-19	St. Peregrine's	Glencullin; Referee: ???

15 September 2018	Thomas Davis	6-18 - 1-07	Erin's Isle	Balgriffin; Referee: ???

=== Group B ===
Team	Pld	W	L	D	PF	PA	PD	Pts
Round Towers Clondalkin	3	3	0	0	60	38	+22	6
Fingallians	3	2	1	0	57	51	+6	4
St. Patrick's Palmerstown	3	1	2	0	43	60	-17	2
Fingal Ravens	3	0	3	0	43	64	-19	0

Round 1

14 April 2018	Round Towers Clondalkin	3-12 - 1-5	Fingallians	Cloghran; Referee: Finbarr Shanahan (St Margarets)
14 April 2018	Jason Joyce 1-7 (0-3f), Ian Ward 1-1, Eric Finn 1-0, Micheal Walsh 0-2, Conor L'Estrange (0-1f) and Thomas Galvin 0-1 each	Report		Cloghran; Referee: Finbarr Shanahan (St Margarets)

24 April 2018; 19:00	St. Patrick's Palmerstown	2-13 - 3-8	Fingal Ravens	St. Margarets; Referee: Finbarr Shanahan (St Margarets)

Round 2

28 April 2018; 18:00	Round Towers Clondalkin	2-13 - 2-12	Fingal Ravens	Cloghran; Referee: Liam Aherne Clarke (Ballyboughal)

28 April 2018; 18:00	Fingallians	2-17 - 1-9	St. Patrick's Palmerstown	Rolestown; Referee: Finbar Gaffney (Na Fianna)
28 April 2018; 18:00	Oisin Lynch 0-14 (0-3f), Paul Flynn 1-1, Niall Tormey 1-0			Rolestown; Referee: Finbar Gaffney (Na Fianna)

Round 3

15 September 2018	Fingallians	2-20 - 2-12	Fingal Ravens	Chanel; Referee: ??? Man of the Match: ???

15 September 2018	Round Towers Clondalkin	2-14 - 0-12	St. Patrick's Palmerstown	Newcastle; Referee: ??? Man of the Match: ???

=== Group C ===
Team	Pld	W	L	D	PF	PA	PD	Pts
Naomh Ólaf	2	2	0	0	31	22	+9	4
Naomh Mearnóg	2	1	1	0	28	29	-1	2
St. Annes	2	0	2	0	28	36	-8	0

Round 1

15 April 2018; 14:15	Naomh Ólaf	3-9 - 0-12	St. Annes	O'Toole Park; Referee: Philip Carr (Round Towers Clondalkin)

Round 2

29 April 2018; 14:15	Naomh Ólaf	0-13 - 1-7	Naomh Mearnóg	O'Toole Park; Referee: Dan Stynes (St. Peregrines); Man of the Match: ???

Round 3

15 September 2018	Naomh Mearnóg	2-12 - 1-13	St. Anne's	Balgriffin; Referee: ??? Man of the Match: ???

=== Group D ===
Team	Pld	W	L	D	PF	PA	PD	Pts
Cuala	3	3	0	0	82	25	+57	6
Templeogue Synge Street	3	2	1	0	43	45	-2	4
Whitehall Colmcille	3	1	2	0	40	69	-29	2
St. Maur's	3	0	3	0	29	55	-26	0

Round 1

14 April 2018; 18:00	Whitehall Colmcille	2-8 - 1-10	St. Maur's	Garristown; Referee: Derek McKitterick (Fingallians); Man of the Match: ???
14 April 2018; 18:00	Cormac Costello 1-7, Eoghan O'Donnell 1-0		Chris Carthy 1-4 (0-4f), Ciaran Archer 0-4 (0-3f), Conor McGuire 0-2	Garristown; Referee: Derek McKitterick (Fingallians); Man of the Match: ???

15 April 2018; 16:00	Cuala	1-17 - 0-8	Templeogue Synge Street	??? Referee: Darren Malone (St. Mary's Saggart); Man of the Match: ???

Round 2

26 April 2018; 19:15	Cuala	5-15 - 0-9	Whitehall Colmcille	O'Toole Park; Referee: Pat McCabe
26 April 2018; 19:15	Niall O'Callaghan 2-3, Con O'Callaghan 1-5 (1-0 pen), Mark Treacy and Jamie Keenan 1-0 each			O'Toole Park; Referee: Pat McCabe

29 April 2018; 11:00	Templeogue Synge Street	0-9 - 0-8	St. Maur's	Drumnigh; Referee: PJ Murray

Round 3

15 September 2018	Cuala	4-20 - 1-5	St. Maur's	Parnell Park; Referee: ??? Man of the Match: ???

15 September 2018	Templeogue Synge Street	5-11 - 1-12	Whitehall Colmcille	O'Toole Park; Referee: ??? Man of the Match: ???

=== Senior 2 Football Championship Knock-Out Stage ===
==== Last Eight ====
Quarter-Finals	Semi-Finals	Final
Cuala
Naomh Mearnog	Cuala
Noamh Olafs	Thomas Davis/Naomh Olafs
Thomas Davis		???
Fingallians		???
Templeogue Synge Street	Fingallians
St. Mary's Saggart	St. Marys Saggart
Round Towers Clondalkin

==== Quarter-finals ====
29 September 2018	Thomas Davis	2-17 - 1-05	Naomh Olaf	O'Toole Park; Referee: ??? Man of the Match: ???
29 September 2018		Match Cancelled		O'Toole Park; Referee: ??? Man of the Match: ???

29 September 2018	Cuala	2-17 - 2-07	Naomh Mearnóg	O'Toole Park; Referee: ??? Man of the Match: ???

29 September 2018	Templeogue Synge Street	1-11 - 1-19	Fingallians	Skerries; Referee: ??? Man of the Match: ???

29 September 2018	St. Mary's Saggart	0-17 - 1-13	Round Towers Clondalkin	Newcastle; Referee: ??? Man of the Match: ???

==== Semi-finals ====
14 October 2018; 14:15; Semi Final	Cuala	2-11 - 2-15	Thomas Davis	Parnell Park; Referee: ??? Man of the Match: ???

13 October 2018; 15:45; Semi Final	Fingallians	0-16 - 1-14	St Marys Saggart	Parnell Park; Referee: ??? Man of the Match: ???

==== Final ====
27 October 2018	St. Mary's, Saggart	1-7 v 4-11	Thomas Davis	Parnell Park; Referee: James King (Garda); Man of the Match: ???
27 October 2018	J. Timmons 0-3 (0-2f), A. Marshall 1-0, B. Kelly (0-1f), S. Redmond (0-1f), G. Murray, R. Butler 0-1 each.		J. White 2-1, C. Farrelly 1-3 (1-0 pen), E. Kirby 0-4 (0-2f), E. Conroy 1-0, G. Carruth, D. Keogh, J. O'Reilly 0-1 each.	Parnell Park; Referee: James King (Garda); Man of the Match: ???

=== Senior 2 Football Championship Relegation Playoffs ===
==== Relegation Semi-Finals ====
2018	BYE	-vs-	BYE	??? Referee: ??? Man of the Match: ???

2018	BYE	-vs-	BYE	??? Referee: ??? Man of the Match: ???

==== Relegation Final ====
2018	BYE	-vs-	BYE	??? Referee: ??? Man of the Match: ???
