= 1994 All-Ireland Junior Football Championship =

All Ireland Champions
- Captain: Michael Keating
- Manager: Buddy O'Grady

All Ireland Runners-up
- Runners-up: Galway
- Captain: Tom Ryder
- Manager: Bosco McDermott

Provincial Champions
- Munster: Kerry
- Leinster: Dublin
- Ulster: Not Played
- Connacht: Galway

The 1994 All-Ireland Junior Football Championship was the 63rd staging of the All-Ireland Junior Championship, the Gaelic Athletic Association's second tier Gaelic football championship.

Cork entered the championship as the defending champions, but lost to Kerry at the semi-final stage of the Munster Championship.

The 1994 All-Ireland final, held at the Gaelic Grounds in Limerick on 6 August 1994, was contested by Kerry and Galway. In what was the second ever meeting of the two counties in the final, Kerry won by 0–15 to 0–04 to claim their 13th championship title overall and a first since 1991.

== Results ==
=== Munster Junior Football Championship ===
| 26 June 1994 Final | Kerry | 1-06 - 0-08 | Clare | Páirc Uí Chaoimh, Cork |
| | | | | Referee: T. Lonergan (Tipperary) |

=== Leinster Junior Football Championship ===
| 12 June 1994 Final | Dublin | 0-09 - 0-05 | Louth | Páirc Tailteann, Navan |
| | D. O'Brien 0-4, B. Heaslip 0-2, C. Foran, J. McGuinness, R. Davis 0-1 each | | B. Martin 0-4, N. Callan 0-1 | Referee: P. Whelan (Wicklow) |

| GK | 1 | Alan Durnan (Clann Mhuire) |
| RCB | 2 | Declan North (Fingallians) |
| FB | 3 | Ben Molloy (Ballyboden St Enda's) |
| LCB | 4 | Kevin Donovan (Thomas Davis) |
| RHB | 5 | John Campbell (Parnells) |
| CHB | 6 | Fergus McNulty (Lucan Sarsfields) |
| LHB | 7 | Wayne Daly (St Kevin's) |
| MF | 8 | Anthony Costello (Naomh Fionnbarra) |
| MF | 9 | Joe McGuinness (St Maurs) |
| RHF | 10 | Paddy Feehan (Naomh Ólaf) |
| CHF | 11 | Damien O'Brien (Lucan Sarsfields) |
| LHF | 12 | Brian Rowe (St Kevin's) |
| RCF | 13 | Ken Rowe (St Kevin's) |
| FF | 14 | Ciarán Foran (Thomas Davis) |
| LCF | 15 | Brian Heaslip (St Anne's) |
Substitutes:
| | 16 | Rupert Davis (O'Dwyer's) for McGuinness |
| | 17 | Anthony White (Clann Mhuire) for Foran |
| | 18 | Colm Kelly (Lucan Sarsfields) for Campbell |

| GK | 1 | Fergus Byrne (Clan na Gael) |
| RCB | 2 | Stephen Matthews (St Kevin's) |
| FB | 3 | Dessie Levins (Hunterstown Rovers) (c) |
| LCB | 4 | Terry Donegan (Mattock Rangers) |
| RHB | 5 | Mark Gogarty (Naomh Malachi) |
| CHB | 6 | Mark Devlin (Naomh Fionnbarra) |
| LHB | 7 | Kieran Maguire (Dundalk Young Irelands) |
| MF | 8 | John Osborne (Naomh Fionnbarra) |
| MF | 9 | Gareth Doyle (Dundalk Young Irelands) |
| RHF | 10 | Noel Callan (Lann Léire) |
| CHF | 11 | Philip Grogan (St Kevin's) |
| LHF | 12 | Stephen Flood (Lann Léire) |
| RCF | 13 | Mark Leavy (Dundalk Young Irelands) |
| FF | 14 | Brendan McGahon (Seán McDermott's) |
| LCF | 15 | Brendan Martin (Lann Léire) |
Substitutes:
| | 16 | Nicky Malone (Lann Léire) for Doyle |
| | 17 | Derek Breagy (John Mitchels) for McGahon |

=== Connacht Junior Football Championship ===
| 14 May 1994 Final | Galway | 0-12 - 1-09 | Mayo | Tuam Stadium, Galway |
| | | | | Referee: A. Noone (Leitrim) |

| 10 June 1994 Final (replay) | Mayo | 0-08 - 0-11 | Galway | MacHale Park, Castlebar |
| | | | | Referee: A. Noone (Leitrim) |

=== All-Ireland semi-finals ===
| 16 July 1994 | Dublin | 1-07 - 0-13 | Kerry | Parnell Park, Dublin |
| | | | | Referee: S. Prior (Leitrim) |

| 17 July 1994 | Lancashire | 0-08 - 1-13 | Galway | Old Bedians, Manchester |

=== All-Ireland final ===
| 6 August 1994 | Kerry | 0-15 - 0-04 | Galway | Gaelic Grounds, Limerick |
| | S. Murphy 0-5, J. Crowley 0-4, P. O'Donoghue, D. Moynihan 0-2 each, S. Stack, S. Fitzgerald 0-1 | | D. O'Fatharta 0-2, N. Ó Neachtain, L. Ó Callaráin 0-1 each | Referee: T. McDermott (Cavan) |
