= Dublin AFL Divisions 3 – 12B =

Dublin Adult Football League Division 3–10 2021
- Title holders: St. Mary's Saggart (Division 3); Clontarf (Division 4); Thomas Davis (Division 5); Ballyboden St. Enda's (Division 6); St Oliver Plunketts ER (Division 7); St Kevin's Killians (Division 8); Naomh Ólaf (Division 9); St. Colmcille's (Division 10); Naomh Mearnog (Division 11 North); Cuala (Division 11 South)

The Dublin adult football league is divided up into a tier system of 13 teams. These teams range from the top two Divisions one and two and eleven other divisions, 3, 4, 5, 6, 7, 8, 9, 10, 11 North and South. The winner of each league title goes on to qualify for the next highest ranking division.

== AFL Division 3 ==
The 2024 Division 3 League, was won by Naomh Fionnbarra who alongside runners up Templeogue Synge Street will qualify for the Division 2 of the Dublin Adult Football League.

=== Roll of honour ===
Year	Winner	Second Place
2025	Naomh Maur	Clanna Gael Fontenoy
2024	Naomh Fionnbarra	Templeogue Synge Street
2023	Naomh Barróg	St Patrick's, Donabate
2022	St. Mary's Saggart	Parnells
2021	St. Mary's Saggart 3–10	St Patrick's, Donabate 1–13
2020	Season Abandoned	COVID-19 pandemic
2019	Naomh Barróg	St Anne's
2018	Kilmacud Crokes	Round Towers, Lusk
2017	Fingallians	Naomh Fionnbarra
2016	Na Fianna	Naomh Ólaf
2015	Kilmacud Crokes	Whitehall Colmcille
2014	Clontarf	Scoil Ui Chonaill
2013	Naomh Barróg	Whitehall Colmcille
2012	St Finian's Swords	Na Fianna
2011	Naomh Barróg	Ballyboden St Enda's
2010	Naomh Fionnbarra	
2009		
2008		
2007		
2006		
2005		
1985	Cuala	

== AFL Division 4 ==
The 2024 Division 4 League was won by Clontarf who won all 15 matches in the League.

=== Roll of honour ===
Year	Winner	Second Place
2025	Castleknock	O'Dwyers
2024	Clontarf	St Finian's Swords
2023	Clann Mhuire	St. Patrick's, Palmerstown
2022	Cuala	St Sylvester's
2021	Clontarf 1–11	Cuala 1-08
2020	Season Abandoned	COVID-19 pandemic
2019	St. Jude's	Clanna Gael Fontenoy
2018	St. Margaret's	Man O War
2017	Trinity Gaels	Good Counsel
2016	Round Towers, Lusk	
2015	Clann Mhuire	Ballyboden St Enda's
2014	Ballymun Kickhams	St. Jude's
2013	Garda	Scoil Ui Chonaill
2012	Castleknock	Scoil Ui Chonaill
2011	Na Fianna	St. Patrick's, Donabate
2010	Ballyboughal	
2009		
2008		
2007		
2006	St Mary's, Saggart	
2005		
2004		
2003		
2002	Cuala	
1993	St Brendan's	

== AFL Division 5 ==
The 2021 Division 5 Final, played on 29 August was won by Thomas Davis and who alongside runners up St Finian's Swords will qualify for the Division 4 of the Dublin Adult Football League.

=== Roll of honour ===
Year	Winner	Second Place
2025	St Patrick's, Donabate	Craobh Chiaráin
2024	Garristown	St Vincent's
2023	Fingal Ravens	O'Dwyers
2022	Thomas Davis	St Oliver Plunketts ER
2021	Thomas Davis 2–14	St Finian's Swords 0-08
2020	Season Abandoned	COVID-19 pandemic
2019	Templeogue Synge Street	Kilmacud Crokes
2018	Clontarf	Na Fianna
2017	Skerries Harps	Raheny
2016	Cuala	Thomas Davis
2015	Round Towers, Lusk	Kilmacud Crokes
2014	St Vincent's	Craobh Chiaráin
2013	Parnells	Craobh Chiaráin
2012	Raheny	Round Towers, Clondalkin
2011	Castleknock	Raheny
2010		
2009	Ballyboughal	
2008		
2007	St Brigid's	
2006		
2005		

== AFL Division 6 ==
The 2021 Division 6 Final, played on 29 August was won by Ballyboden St. Enda's and alongside runners up Fingal Ravens will qualify for the Division 5 of the Dublin Adult Football League.

=== Roll of honour ===
Year	Winner	Second Place
2025	St Brigid's	Ranelagh Gaels
2024	Craobh Chiaráin	St Vincent's
2023		
2022	Fingal Ravens	Whitehall Colmcille
2021	Ballyboden St. Enda's 1–10	Fingal Ravens 1-09
2020	Season Abandoned	COVID-19 pandemic
2019	Crumlin	Naomh Ólaf
2018	Na Gaeil Óga	Craobh Chiaráin
2017	Ballymun Kickhams	St Brendan's
2016	Clontarf	Skerries Harps
2015	St. Peregrines	Castleknock
2014	Templeogue Synge Street	St Sylvester's
2013	St Vincent's	Civil Service
2012	St. Peregrines	Naomh Barróg
2011	Parnells	Na Fianna
2010		
2009		
2008		
2007	Man O War	
2006	St Patrick's, Donabate	
2005	Ballyboden Wanderers	

== AFL Division 7 ==
In 2022, Garristown finished an impressive year as league champions where they were unbeaten throughout.

=== Roll of honour ===
Year	Winner	Second Place
2025	St. Anne's	St Patrick's, Donabate
2024	Beann Eadair	Ranelagh Gaels
2023		
2022	Garristown	St James Gaels/An Caisleán
2021	St Oliver Plunkett's ER 2–10	St Patrick's, Donabate 1-05
2020	Season Abandoned	COVID-19 pandemic
2019	St. Anne's	Kilmacud Crokes
2018	Geraldine Moran's	Naomh Ólaf
2017	Na Gaeil Óga	Thomas Davis
2016	Ballyboden Wanderers	Ballymun Kickhams
2015	Lucan Sarsfields	St Vincent's
2014	St Oliver Plunketts ER	St Brendan's
2013	St Brigid's	Bank of Ireland
2012	St. Sylvester's	St. Vincent's
2011	Naomh Fionnbarra	St. Vincent's
2010		
2009	Skerries Harps	
2008	Trinity Gaels	
2007		
2006		
2005		
2004		
2003		
2002	Ballinteer St. John's	

== AFL Division 8 ==
The 2021 Division 8 Final, played on 29 August was won by St Kevin's Killians and alongside runners up Na Fianna will qualify for the Division 7 of the Dublin Adult Football League.

=== Roll of honour ===
Year	Winner	Second Place
2025	Naomh Barróg	Clann Mhuire
2024	Clontarf	Parnells
2023		
2022		
2021	St Kevin's Killians 0–28	Na Fianna 0–25
2020	Season Abandoned	COVID-19 pandemic
2019	Garristown	St Patrick's Donabate
2018	Kilmacud Crokes	Round Towers, Lusk
2017	Naomh Ólaf	Geraldine P Morans
2016	Cuala	Na Gaeil Óga
2015	Scoil Uí Chonaill	Liffey Gaels
2014	Round Towers, Clondalkin	St Vincents
2013	St Brendan's	Lucan Sarsfields
2012	Ballinteer St. John's	Raheny
2011	Parnells	Erin go Bragh
2010	Stars of Erin	Ballyboden St Enda's
2009	St. Joseph's/OCB	
2008		
2007	Trinity Gaels	
2006		
2002	Cuala	

== AFL Division 9 ==
The 2021 Division 9 Final, played on 29 August was won by Naomh Ólaf and alongside runners up Ballyboughal will qualify for the Division 8 of the Dublin Adult Football League.

=== Roll of honour ===
Year	Winner	Second Place
2025	Robert Emmets	Garda Westmanstown Gaels
2024		
2023		
2022		
2021	Naomh Ólaf 0–18	Ballyboughal 2-04
2020	Season Abandoned	COVID-19 pandemic
2019	Clontarf	Rosmini Gaels
2018	Ballyfermot De La Salle	Beann Eadair
2017	St Oliver Plunketts/Eoghan Ruadh	Kilmacud Crokes
2016	Naomh Ólaf	Ballyboden St Enda's
2015	St Sylvester's	St Patrick's, Donabate
2014	Cuala	Geraldine P. Morans
2013	Ballyboughal	Na Gaeil Óga
2012	Round Towers, Clondalkin	Na Fianna
2011	St Brendan's	Raheny
2010	Wild Geese	Park Rangers
2009	Ranelagh Gaels	Ballyboden St Enda's
2008	Kilmacud Crokes	St Brigid's
2007	St. Peregrines	St Patrick's, Palmerstown
2006	Craobh Chiaráin 3-04	Raheny 1-06

== AFL Division 10 ==
The 2021 Division 10 Final, played on 29 August was won by St. Colmcille's and alongside runners up Thomas Davis will qualify for the Division 9 of the Dublin Adult Football League.

=== Roll of honour ===
Year	Winner	Second Place
2025	O'Dwyer's	St Margaret's
2024		
2023		
2022		
2021	St. Colmcille's 3-09	Thomas Davis 1–14
2020	Season Abandoned	COVID-19 pandemic
2019	Naomh Ólaf	Clanna Gael Fontenoy
2018	St. Sylvester's	Cuala
2017	Ballyfermot De La Salle	St Vincent's
2016	Skerries Harps	Clann Mhuire
2015	Castleknock	St Jude's
2014	St Patrick's, Donabate	St. Colmcilles
2013	O'Dwyer's	St. Colmcille's
2012	St. Maurs	St Margaret's
2011	Naomh Mearnóg	Innisfails
2010	St Margaret's	Beann Eadair
2009	Parnells	Wild Geese

For the 2015 season, The Dublin County Board announced that Division 10 would be run on an All County basis. The teams that contested AFL10 North County in 2015 were: Castleknock, Crumlin, Cuala, Fingal Ravens, Na Fianna, Naomh Fionnbarra, Rosmini Gaels, Round Towers (L), St Brendan's, St Jude's, St Mark's, St Patrick's (P)

== AFL Division 10S ==
The current Division Ten South County champions are St Kevins Killians, who made up for their defeat in the Junior E Championship Final by going through the whole division undefeated and now go on to qualify for the Division 9 of the Dublin Adult Football League.

=== Roll of honour ===
Year	Winner	Second Place
2025	Man O War	Na Fianna
2024	Robert Emmets	St Jude's
2014	St Kevin's Killians	St Marks
2013	Geraldine Moran's	Wanderers
2012	Na Gaeil Óga	St Kevin's Killians
2011	Castleknock	Oliver Plunketts Eoghan Ruadh
2010	Cuala	Lucan Sarsfields
2009	St Anne's	St. James Gaels

For the 2015 season, The Dublin County Board announced that Division 10 would be run on an All County Basis.

== AFL Division 11N ==
The Dublin Division 11 North was won by St. Margarets who finished the year unbeaten

=== Roll of honour ===
Year	Winner	Second Place
2025	Na Gaeil Aeracha	Ranelagh Gaels
2024	Craobh Chiaráin	Man O War
2023		
2022	St. Margaret's	Garristown
2021	Naomh Mearnóg 0–14	Fingal Ravens 0–10
2020	Season Abandoned	COVID-19 pandemic
2019	Starlights	Whitehall Colmcille
2018	Man O War	Erin Go Bragh
2017	Lucan Sarsfields	St Monica's
2016	Erins Isle	St Brigid's
2015	Fingallians	Clann Mhuire
2014*	Clontarf	Clanna Gael Fontenoy
2013*	St. Peregrines	AIB Dublin
2012*	Parnells	AIB Dublin
2011	Round Towers Lusk	Innisfails
2010	O'Tooles	Fingal Ravens
2009	St. Maurs	St Margarets

- As AFL10 Mid County, which was discontinued after 2014 after the Dublin County Board announced that Division 10 would be run on an All County Basis.

== AFL Division 11S ==
The Dublin County Board Division 11 South title was won by Cuala, who defeated St Finian's Newcastle 3–1 on a penalty shoot out after the game finished level 2–8 to 1–11 after extra time.

=== Roll of honour ===
Year	Winner	Second Place
2025	Clontarf	Na Dubh Ghall
2024	Ballinteer St. John's	Stars of Erin
2023		
2022	St Jude's	Lucan Sarsfields
2021	Cuala 2-08	St Finian's, Newcastle 1–11
2020	Season Abandoned	COVID-19 pandemic
2019	Crumlin	
2018	Round Towers, Clondalkin	Thomas Davis
2017	Naomh Ólaf	Ballyboden Wanderers
2016	St Marks	Cabinteely
2015	Round Towers, Clondalkin	Ballyfermot De La Salle
2014		
2013		
2012	Templeogue Synge Street	Good Counsel
2011	Wanderers	St Jude's
2010	Robert Emmetts	Kilmacud Crokes
2009	St Marks	Castleknock

{^ As AFL10 South City}
