= Lorcan Redmond =

Personal information
- Native name: Lorcán Réamonn (Irish)
- Born: 26 October 1930 (age 96) Dublin, Ireland
- Occupation: Wholesaler

Sport
- Sport: Gaelic football
- Position: Right wing-forward
Club
- Years: Club
- 1946-1975: St Margaret's
Club titles
- Dublin titles: 0
Inter-county
- Years: County
- 1954-1957: Wicklow
Inter-county titles
- Leinster titles: 0
- All-Irelands: 0
- NFL: 0

Lorcan Redmond
Sport
Inter-county management
- Years: Team
- 1973-1986: Dublin senior football team
Inter-county titles as manager
County	League	Province	All-Ireland
Dublin	4	9	9

Lorcan Redmond (born 26 October 1930) is an Irish former Gaelic football player and selector. As a player he lined out with St Margaret's and the Wicklow senior football team before later enjoying success as a selector with the Dublin senior football team.

== Playing career ==
Redmond spent over 30 years playing with the St Margaret's club in north County Dublin. After beginning in the juvenile and underage grades, he continued to line out for the club into his forties. At inter-county level, Redmond won two O'Byrne Cup titles with the Wicklow senior football team.

== Management career ==
Redmond, alongside Donal Colfer, became a selector under the management of Kevin Heffernan with the Dublin senior football team in 1973. It was a triumvirate that yielded four All-Ireland Championships over the course of the following decade. Redmond's tenure as a selector, which ended in 1986, also saw Dublin win nine Leinster Championships and two National Football League titles. He returned as a selector under Mickey Whelan in 1995 and later served as manager of the Dublin under-21 team. His management lasted for the span of 3 matches, all of which were won by Dublin, leaving Redmond with a 100% win rate as a manager

== Honours ==
=== Player ===
Wicklow

- O'Byrne Cup: 1955, 1957

=== Selector ===
Dublin

- All-Ireland Senior Football Championship: 1974, 1976, 1977, 1983
- Leinster Senior Football Championship: 1974, 1975, 1976, 1977, 1978, 1979, 1983, 1984, 1985
- National Football League: 1975–76, 1977–78
