= Na Gaeil Óga CLG =

Gaelic games club in County Dublin, Ireland

- Na Gaeil Óga
- Founded: 2010
- County: Dublin
- Colours: Navy and blue
- Grounds: Phoenix Park and St. Catherines Park, Lucan.
- Coordinates: 53°22′23.63″N 6°13′44.96″W

Playing kits
Standard colours

Senior Club Championships
	All Ireland	Leinster champions	Dublin champions
Football:	0	0	0
Hurling:	-	-	0
Camogie:	-	0	1

Na Gaeil Óga, CLG are a Dublin GAA, Irish-speaking Gaelic football, hurling and camogie club based in St. Catherines Park, Lucan and Phoenix Park, County Dublin founded in 2010. An underage structure was founded in 2014 catering for girls and boys in hurling, camogie and football.

== History ==
Na Gaeil Óga currently have seven adult teams, two male football teams, one ladies football team, three hurling teams and a camogie team. They take part in the Junior Football C and D championships and Divisions 5 and 10 South of the Adult Football League. They also have a ladies football team. In their first season as a team in 2011, the male football team finished second last in the division 10 south of the AFL and were knocked out at the semi-final stage of the Dublin Junior E Football Championship. They take part in Comórtas Peile na Gaeltachta and have done so each year since 2011.

The club expanded to two football teams and a ladies football team in 2012 winning Division 10 South County and Corn Uí Bhroin. They started fielding a hurling team in 2013 and the third in 2022. 2013 ended with a mid table finish for both hurling and the second football team known as 'The B Special's'. Both the ladies football team and men's A football team were promoted.

A camogie team was started in 2015. A third hurling team was fielded from 2022.

== Honours ==
- Dublin AFL Div. 10S Winners 2012
- Corn Uí Bhroin/The Ó Broin Cup 2012.
- Dublin AFL Div. 9 Runners up and winners of the promotion play-offs - 2013.
- Ladies football team, 2013 runners up and promoted.
- Dublin AFL Div. 8 Runners-Up & promoted 2016.
- Dublin AFL Div. 7 2017 - promotion to Division 6. Hurling team winners of division 8, promotion to Division 7.
- Camogie team Division 8 2018 - Winners and promoted. Men's A football team, winners of Division 6, promotion to Division 5. Hurling team runners up in Junior D Championship Final and promoted.
- Camogie team win first ever championship in the club's history.
- Ladies' football team won League 8 in 2021
