= Round Towers GAA =

Round Towers GAA may refer to:

- Round Towers GAA (Kildare) - Kildare town
- Round Towers GAA (Clondalkin) - Dublin
- Round Towers GAA (London) - London
- Round Towers GAA (Lusk) - Dublin
