= St Dympna's GAA =

St Dympna's GAA may refer to:

- St Brendan's GAA (Dublin), a sports club formerly known as St Dympna's
- Dromore St Dympna's GFC, a sports club
