= St Colmcille's (Balheary) =

- Founded: 1935
- County: Dublin
- Nickname: Cilles
- Colours: Royal Blue and Amber
- Grounds: Balheary, Swords

Playing kits
Standard colours

St Colmcille's (Irish: Naomh Colmcille) are one of three GAA clubs in Swords, County Dublin, Ireland. The other two Swords clubs are St Finians and Fingallians.

The club was founded in 1935, and fields a single junior football team in Division 10 of the Dublin AFL (adult football league). The club's grounds are located at Hollybanks, Glen Ellen Road, Swords.

== History ==
The club was founded in 1935 and initially shared football pitches with other clubs in the area. The club is traditionally associated with the 'Top Of The Town' (from Kettles Lane to Mountgorry to Balheary) as the club founders were from that part of the town.

In 2003, the club began construction of a new clubhouse costing 1.7 million EUR. The project was funded through a 300,000 EUR grant from the Sports Capital Programme, 75,000 EUR from Fingal County Council, with the club raising the rest of the required funds through club finance and a loan. The new clubhouse development was built on a one-acre site adjacent to the club's pitch. The two-storey building has two dressing rooms, a referee's room, sports hall, office, gym, meeting room and a bar/lounge as well as car parking facilities.

A new extension has since been added which incorporates additional meeting rooms and a balcony area from which matches can be viewed.

== Football ==
The club reached a Dublin Junior Football Championship final in 1968. Around the same time the club had several representatives on the Dublin junior, under 21 and minor football panels.

In 2006 the club had two football teams in Division 8 and 11 North. By 2011, the club was fielding a single team.

In 2013, the Junior team reached the Championship Final Junior E Football Championship and were runners up in the League Cup and Duffy Cup.

In 2014, the club went one step better than in 1968 and 2013 by winning a Dublin Football Championship. The 2014 Junior E Final took place on 20 September between St.Kevin Killians and St. Colmcilles in O'Toole Park. St.Colmcilles won the game.

== Honours ==
- Dublin Junior Football Championship (0): Runners-up 1968
- Junior E Football Championship (1): Winners 2014
- Dublin AFL Div. 10 (1): Winners 2021
