= St Brendan's GAA (Dublin) =

Gaelic games club in County Dublin, Ireland

- CLG Naomh Breandáin
- Founded: 1920
- County: Dublin
- Nickname: The Dark Force
- Grounds: Grangegorman

Playing kits
Standard colours

Senior Club Championships
	All Ireland	Leinster champions	Dublin champions
Football:	-	-	-
Hurling:	-	-	1
Ladies' football:	-	-	-
Camogie:	-	-	-

St Brendan's GAA is a Dublin GAA-affiliated Gaelic football club based in the Grangegorman area of the north of Dublin city, Ireland.

The club dates back (in one guise or another) to 1920. Founded in 1920 the club was firstly named the Richmond Asylum Hurling Club. The name was changed in 1923 to St Dympna‘s. The club became known as St Brendan’s in 1958 to coincide with the change in name of the hospital with which it is closely associated.

The most famous day in the club's history was probably the 1980 Dublin Senior Hurling Championship final win over Faughs.

== Men's Hurling ==
The club competes in Division 6 of the Dublin hurling leagues.

== Men's Football ==
The club competes in Division 5 and Division 10 of the Dublin leagues.

Between 2011 and 2017 the Men's football team went from Division 9 to Division 5, winning Divisions 9 and 8 and winning playoffs from Divisions 7 and 6.

They lost the 2019 Junior Football Championship Final and were promoted to Intermediate where they remained until 2022.

They were hammered by St Finians Swords in the first stage of the championship 2025, losing by 8 points. Finian's then went on to win the final.

== Ladies Football ==
A Ladies Football team was set up in the club in 2012 and started playing in the 2013 season. In 2016 The Ladies won their first trophy winning the Ladies Adult Football Division 9 League Title. In 2017 The team went one further by bring the first Ladies Football Championship to Grangegorman when winning the Junior F Championship. In 2018 there is now two Ladies Football teams in the club with the 1st team playing in Division 5 and the 2nd team in Division 8. In 2019, Both Ladies Football teams won their respective Junior Football Championships, the 1sts defeating Crumlin on 31 August in Junior C and the 2nds defeating Erin Go Brágh on 4 September in Junior H.

== Juvenile Section ==
A juvenile section was set up in 2014 and there is now an academy catering for boys and girls aged 4–7 and teams up to U12. The Juvenile club is very active in the Dublin 7 community, providing coaching to local schools, running initiatives like Gaelic4Girls, and participating in events such as the Pride of Stoneybatter festival.

== Camogie ==
A camogie team was set up in 2021 and won a county championship in its first year of existence.

== Club Honors ==
- Dublin Senior Hurling Championship: Winners 1980
- Dublin Intermediate Hurling Championship: (as St Dympna's 1952) Winners 1972
- Dublin Junior Hurling Championship: Winners (as St Dympna's 1937, 1950) 1970, 1987
- 2009 Dublin Hurling League Division 7 Champions
- 2010 Dublin Hurling League Division 6 Champions
- Dublin AFL Div. 9: Champions 2011
- Dublin AFL Div. 8: Champions 2013
- 2013 Dublin Hurling League Division 6 Champions
- Dublin AFL Div. 7: Promotion Play Off Winners 2014
- 2016 Dublin Ladies Adult Football League Division 9 Champions
- 2017 Dublin Ladies Football Junior F Championship
- Dublin AFL Div. 6: Promotion Play Off Winners 2017
- 2019 Dublin Ladies Football Junior C Championship 1st XV
- 2019 Dublin Ladies Football Junior H Championship 2nd XV
- 2020 Dublin Ladies Football Junior G Shield Winners 2nd XV
- 2021 Dublin Camogie Junior 5B Championship Champions
- 2022 Dublin Junior D Hurling Championship Champions

Preceded by Crumlin	Dublin Senior Hurling Champions; 1980	Succeeded by St Vincents
