= Dublin Senior Camogie Championship =

Annual camogie competition in Ireland

- Code: Camogie
- Founded: 1927
- Region: Dublin (GAA)
- Trophy: Maura Brady Cup
- No. of teams: 10
- Title holders: St Vincents (12th title)
- First winner: Crokes
- Most titles: UCD (15 titles)
- Sponsors: PTSB
- Official website: www.dublincamogie.ie

The Dublin Camogie Championship is the senior Camogie competition featuring clubs affiliated to the Dublin GAA. The championship is sponsored by PTSB.

In 2026, 82 teams competed across 12 divisions in Dublin. 10 teams compete in the Senior Championship.

The winners of the Dublin Senior Camogie Championship are awarded the Maura Brady Cup.

UCD are the competitions most successful club, having won 15 titles.

St Vincents are the reigning champions, having defeated St Jude's in the 2026 final.

== Format ==
=== Group stage ===
Ten teams compete in two groups of five. Two points are awarded for a win and one for a draw. The 1st and 2nd placed teams of both groups advance to the Semi-Finals. The 4th and 5th placed teams advance to a relegation play-off.

=== Knock Out stage ===
The 1st and 2nd placed teams of both groups face off in the Semi-Finals. The winners advance to the Finals. The winner of the Finals becomes champion and qualifies for the Leinster Senior Club Camogie Championship.

== Teams ==
Team	Position in 2026	Titles	Last Title
St Vincent's	Champion	12	2026
St Jude's	Runners-up	3	2021
Ballyboden St Enda's	Semi-Finalist	10	2014
Kilmacud Crokes	Semi-Finalist	1	1927
Lucan Sarsfields	Group stage	0	—
Cuala	Group stage	0	—
Na Fianna	Relegation Play-off	0	—
St Oliver Plunketts/Eoghan Ruadh	Relegation Play-off	5	1969
Faughs	Relegated	0	—
Castleknock	Relegated	0	—

== Roll of honour ==
#	Club	Total Titles	Seasons
1	UCD	15	1928, 1931, 1932, 1935, 1937, 1938, 1940, 1942, 1955, 1956, 1957, 1958, 1962, 1981, 1982
2	Celtic	14	1952, 1961, 1964, 1965, 1973, 1976, 1977, 1978, 1978, 1983, 1984, 1988, 1991, 1997
3	St Vincents	12	1998, 2005, 2007, 2015, 2016, 2017, 2019, 2022, 2023, 2024, 2025, 2026
4	Ballyboden	10	1999, 2000, 2001, 2006, 2008, 2010, 2011, 2012, 2013, 2014
5	Austin Stacks	9	1945, 1948, 1963, 1970, 1971, 1972, 1974, 1975, 1980
6	Marino	6	1990, 1992, 1993, 1994, 1995, 1996
6	CIE	6	1947, 1949, 1950, 1951, 1954, 1958
8	Eoghan Ruadh	5	1953, 1960, 1967, 1968, 1969
9	Coláiste San Dominic	4	1933, 1936, 1939, 1946
10	St Jude's	3	2018, 2020, 2021
10	Crumlin	3	1985, 1986, 1987
12	Good Counsel	2	2002, 2004
12	Optimists	2	1943, 1944
14	Naomh Mearnóg	1	2009
14	Erins Isle	1	2003
14	Cumann Uí Chonaill	1	1989
14	Naomh Aoife	1	1966
14	Scoil Brighide	1	1934
14	Clan United	1	1930
14	Bray United	1	1929
14	Crokes	1	1927

== Finals ==
The winners of the Dublin Senior Camogie Championship qualify to play in the Leinster Senior Club Camogie Championship and if they win that, they qualify for the All-Ireland Club Camogie Championship.

Leinster and All-Ireland winners
Leinster winners and All-Ireland finalists
Leinster winners

Year	Winner	Score	Runners up	Score	Venue
2026	St Vincents	3-14	St Jude's	0-10	Parnell Park
2025	St Vincents	2–15	Lucan Sarsfields	2–04	Parnell Park
2024	St Vincents	1–12	Ballyboden	0–08	Parnell Park
2023	St Vincents	0–15	St Jude's	2–06	Parnell Park
2022	St Vincents	1–14	Na Fianna	0–10	Parnell Park
2021	St Jude's	1–14	St Vincents	0–15	Abbotstown
2020	St Jude's	3–13	St Vincents	0–15	Abbotstown
2019	St Vincents	4–11	St Jude's	2–05	Abbotstown
2018	St Jude's	0–15	Na Fianna	1–09	St Peregrine's
2017	St Vincents	1–13	Na Fianna	1–03	Abbotstown
2016	St Vincents	1–08	Lucan Sarsfields	1–05	Abbotstown
2015	St Vincents	1–14	Lucan Sarsfields	3–07	Bohernabreena
2014	Ballyboden	1–07	St Vincents	0–07	O'Toole Park
2013	Ballyboden	2–07	St Vincents	1–07	Donaghmede
2012	Ballyboden	1–11	St Vincents	1–05	St Peregrine's
2011	Ballyboden	2–08	Raheny GAA	1–06	Parnell Park
2010	Ballyboden	2–17	Erins Isle	0–08	St Peregrine's
2009	Naomh Mearnóg	1–11	Good Counsel	1–09	Iveagh Grounds
2008	Ballyboden	0–10	St Vincents	0–04	St Peregrine's
2007	St Vincents	4–15	Naomh Mearnóg	1–07	Páirc Barróg
2006	Ballyboden	2–02	St Vincents	0–07	St Peregrine's
2005	St Vincents	4–05	Erins Isle	2–04	Naomh Mearnóg
2004	Good Counsel	3–05	Ballyboden	1–10	O'Toole Park
2003	Erins Isle		St Vincents		
2002	Good Counsel	5–07	Ballyboden	1–04	O'Toole Park
2001	Ballyboden	1–14	Good Counsel	0-06	Parnell Park
2000	Ballyboden	2-07	Crumlin	0-02	Parnell Park
1999	Ballyboden	2-07	St Vincents	1-09	Parnell Park
1998	St Vincents	1–15	Ballyboden	1–10	O'Toole Park
1997	Celtic				
1996	Marino				
1995	Marino				
1994	Marino				
1993	Marino				
1992	Marino				
1991	Celtic				
1990	Marino				
1989	Cumann Uí Chonaill				
1988	Celtic				
1987	Crumlin				
1986	Crumlin				
1985	Crumlin				
1984	Celtic				
1983	Celtic				
1982	UCD				
1981	UCD				
1980	Austin Stacks				
1979	Celtic				
1978	Celtic				
1977	Celtic				
1976	Celtic				
1975	Austin Stacks				
1974	Austin Stacks				
1973	Celtic				
1972	Austin Stacks				
1971	Austin Stacks				
1970	Austin Stacks				
1969	Eoghan Ruadh				
1968	Eoghan Ruadh				
1967	Eoghan Ruadh				
1966	Naomh Aoife				
1965	Celtic				
1964	Celtic				
1963	Austin Stacks				
1962	UCD				
1961	Celtic				
1960	Eoghan Ruadh				
1959	UCD				
1958	CIE				
1957	UCD				
1956	UCD				
1955	UCD				
1954	CIE				
1953	Eoghan Ruadh				
1952	Celtic				
1951	CIE				
1950	CIE				
1949	CIE				
1948	Austin Stacks				
1947	CIE				
1946	Coláiste San Dominic				
1945	Austin Stacks				
1944	Optimists				
1943	Optimists				
1942	UCD				
1941					
1940	UCD				
1939	Coláiste San Dominic				
1938	UCD				
1937	UCD				
1936	Coláiste San Dominic				
1935	UCD				
1934	Scoil Brighide				
1933	Coláiste San Dominic				
1932	UCD				
1931	UCD				
1930	Clan United				
1929	Bray United				
1928	UCD				
1927	Crokes				
