= Stars of Erin GAA =

Gaelic games club in County Dublin, Ireland

- Réaltaí na hÉireann CLG
- Founded: 1903
- County: Dublin
- Colours: Green and red
- Grounds: Ballybrack Road, Glencullen, Stepaside, County Dublin

Playing kits
Standard colours

Stars of Erin GAA is a Gaelic Athletic Association club based in the Glencullen/Stepaside areas of Dún Laoghaire–Rathdown within the traditional County Dublin. Stars of Erin is famously known as the highest GAA Club & Pitch in Ireland in terms of altitude above Sea Level.

As of 25 June 2020, the club had around 400 members.

== Honours ==
- Dublin Junior D Football Championship: Winners 2010
- Dublin AFL Div. 8: Winners 2010
- Dublin Junior Hurling Championship: Winners of 2024 Junior G Hurling Championship
