= Ballyboden Wanderers GAA =

Football club in Ireland

Wanderers GAA Club
- Na Fánaithe
- Founded: 1910
- County: Dublin
- Nickname: Wanderers
- Colours: Black and red
- Grounds: Frank Kelly Park, Mount Venus Road
- Coordinates: 53°15′38.53″N 6°18′09.75″W

Playing kits
Standard colours

Wanderers GAA Ballyboden (Irish: Fánaithe Bhaile Baodáin) is a Gaelic Athletic Association (GAA) club located in Ballyboden, Dublin, Ireland.

The men's first team won the Dublin Junior Two Football Championship in 2020. The club had previously won the Dublin Junior Football Championship in 1968 and 1928.

== History ==
Ballyboden Wanderers GAA Club was originally founded in 1910. The club played its first match against Clanna Gael Fontenoys in April 1910. This match was played, with the permission of Padraig Mac Piarais, in the grounds of Scoil Eanna, Grange Road Rathfarnham. The club won the inaugural Dublin Junior Football Championship in 1928.

The club disbanded in 1932 and, while there some fixtures played in the intervening years, it was not officially reformed until 1961. After winning the Dublin Junior Football Championship in 1968, under the captaincy of Seán Doherty, the Ballyboden club amalgamated with Rathfarnham St. Enda's in order to join the senior ranks under the name Ballyboden St. Enda's.

The current club was formed in 1980, when a group of breakaway members formed Wanderers. Since then, the club has grown and it fields several football teams and juvenile hurling teams at juvenile and adult levels.

The club has 8 acres (3.2 ha) of ground incorporating two playing pitches, and a training area at Frank Kelly Park. These club grounds were officially opened in 1991 and were named for (and opened by) the club president Frank Kelly. Opened when Kelly was still alive, the grounds were the first to be dedicated in tribute to a living member of the association - in breach of the official GAA rules. Kelly died in 1995.

The development of a new clubhouse commenced in 1998, when then Minister Tom Kitt "turned the sod" in March 1998. This clubhouse was officially opened in 1999. In 2006, Wanderers opened a new meeting room and a weights room on the premises.

== Colours and crest ==
Wanderers club crest

The club's primary kit comprises a black jersey with a red band, black shorts and black socks with red and white trimmings. The club's alternative jersey is red with a black band.

The club's crest features the Whitechurch Carnegie Library which opened at Taylor's Lane in 1910. Players from the club assembled for many years outside the library before matches, while the club's committee also met there prior to the opening of the clubhouse. The Hell Fire Club, at the summit of Mount Pelier, is in the backdrop, while the blue coloured foreground symbolises the Owendoher and Little Dargle River which are boundaries of the Ballyboden parish. The triangular shape of the crest is intended to symbolise a modern club built on strong foundations.

== Location ==
The club's catchment area mostly spans Ballyboden parish. Many of the club's juvenile players attend the local primary and secondary schools.

The club's headquarters are at Frank Kelly Park, Mount Venus Road in Rathfarnham, Dublin 16. There are two playing pitches, a training ground, and a 250-square metre clubhouse. The club also use pitches at Scoil Mhuire school, Ballyboden. In early 2026, it was reported that €2.5m had been allocated to develop facilities at Whitechurch to "become a new home for Ballyboden Wanderers GAA and Whitechurch Boxing Club".

== Roll of honour ==
- Dublin Junior Football Championships (2): 1928, 1968
- Dublin Junior 2 Football Championships (1): 2020
- Dublin Junior B Football Championship (0): (runners-up in 2016, 2022)
- Dublin AFL Div 6 (1): 2005
- Dublin AFL Div 7 (1): 2016
- Dublin AFL Div. 10S (section): 2013
- Dublin AFL Div 11 South (1): 2011
- Dublin AFL Div. 12 (1): 2009
- Dublin Ladies Junior F Football Championship (2): 2008, 2018
- Dublin Ladies Junior E Football Championship (1): 2019

== Notable former players ==
- Seán Doherty, Senior Dublin men's footballer
- Nicola Daly, Senior Dublin Ladies' footballer and women's field hockey international
- Alison Meeke, Women's field hockey international

Preceded by Ballyboughal	Dublin Junior Champions; 1967–1968	Succeeded by Fingal Ravens

Preceded by Inaugural winners	Dublin Junior Champions; 1927–1928	Succeeded by St. Josephs
