= Dublin AFL Division 2 =

Dublin Adult Football League Division 2
- Title holders: St Oliver Plunketts eoghan rugadh

The Dublin AFL Division 2 or Dublin Adult Football League Division 2 is the second division of the top tier of Gaelic football in County Dublin. The winners will play in Dublin AFL Division 1 the following year.

== Roll of honour ==
Year	Winner	Second Place
2025	Skerries Harps	Raheny
2024	St Patrick's, Donabate	Fingal Ravens
2023		St Marys, Saggart
2022	St Sylvester's	Naamh Olaf
2021	St Oliver Plunketts/Eoghan Ruadh 1-21	Raheny 3-11
2020		
2019	Castleknock	Clontarf
2018	Templeogue Synge Street	Fingallians
2017	Ballinteer St John's	Naomh Ólaf
2016	Skerries Harps	Clontarf
2015	Castleknock	Lucan Sarsfields
2014	Fingal Ravens	Cuala
2013	St Patrick's, Donabate	Ballinteer St. John's
2012	Raheny	Round Towers, Clondalkin
2011	St. Maurs	
2010		
2009	Erins Isle	
2008	Fingal Ravens	St Marys, Saggart
2007		
2006	St Oliver Plunketts/Eoghan Ruadh	
2005		
2004		
2003		
2002	Ballinteer St. John's	
2001		
2000	St Marys, Saggart	
1999	Trinity Gaels	
1998		
1997		
1996		
1995		
1994		
1993	St Marys, Saggart	
1988	Kilmacud Crokes	
1987		
1986		
1985		Scoil Ui Chonaill
1984	Fingallians	
1983		
1982	Erin's Isle	Fingallians
1981		
1980	Kilmacud Crokes	
1979		
1978		
1977	Scoil Ui Chonaill	
1976		
1975		
1974		
1973	Civil Service	
1972		Scoil Ui Chonaill
1943	Ard Craobh	Fingallians
