= Clann Mhuire CLG =

Gaelic Athletic Association club in Ireland

- Clann Mhuire
- Founded: 1957
- County: Dublin
- Nickname: The Mhuire
- Colours: Green and Gold
- Grounds: Naul
- Coordinates: 53°35′12.44″N 6°17′36.4″W

Playing kits
Standard colours

Clann Mhuire (Irish pronunciation: [klˠɑːn̪ˠ ˈwɪɾʲə], lit. 'Clan of Mary') is a Gaelic Athletic Association club based at Naul, County Dublin, Ireland, serving Naul and its surrounding areas.

The club was founded in 1957, and originally based in Reynoldstown before later moving to just outside Naul village. Its crest depicts a football; St Bernadette praying to the Marian apparition at Lourdes (the club was founded just after the Marian year 1954); and the Big Tree, a sweet chestnut that stood in the centre of Naul until 2017.

Its current pitch on the Fieldstown road was opened on 16 May 2004 by then-GAA president Sean Kelly.

The club fields teams from U-8 to U-18 for both boys and girls. At adult level, the club has two football teams competing in Dublin AFL Div. 3 and AFL Div. 8, the Dublin Intermediate Football Championship, and one ladies football team in Division 2.

== Achievements ==
- Dublin Junior Football Championship Winners 1994
- Dublin Ladies Junior A Football Championship Winners 2014.
- Dublin AFL Div. 4 Winners 2015
