= Scoil Uí Chonaill CLG =

Sports club in County Dublin, Ireland

Scoil Uí Chonaill
- Founded: 1950
- County: Dublin
- Nickname: Scoil
- Colours: Royal blue, maroon & amber
- Grounds: 95 Clontarf Road, Dublin 3
- Coordinates: 53°21′41.21″N 6°12′22.15″W

Playing kits
Standard colours

Senior Club Championships
	All Ireland	Leinster champions	Dublin champions
Football:	-	-	2

Scoil Uí Chonaill is a Gaelic Athletic Association club based in Dublin, Ireland.

== History ==
Scoil Uí Chonaill CLG was founded in 1950 by Brother Jim Scully, Principal of O’Connell School, initially to provide Gaelic games for pupils and past pupils of the O'Connell School.

The Club maintains strong ties with O’Connell Primary and Secondary schools.

== Achievements & Facilities ==
The last 5 years has seen its facilities transform with the addition of redeveloped unisex changing facilities, club gym and hurling wall. This has helped both men’s teams earn six promotions, including 2 league titles, which is testament to the Club's ambition and effort. There are three Adult Men's teams which play football in AFL2, AFL7 and AFL11. Adult Hurlers play in AHL2 and AHL9 while the Adult Ladies teams play in AFL3 and AFL9, Championships and Cups. The Adult teams also play in hurling and football Championships and Cups organised by the County Board.

== Roll of Honour ==
- Dublin Senior Football Championship Winners 1983, 1986
- Dublin Senior B Hurling Championship Winners 2019
- Dublin Intermediate Hurling Championship Winners 1959, 1969, 1980
- Dublin Intermediate Football Championship Winners 1963, 2023
- Dublin Intermediate Hurling League Winners 1958, 1969, 1973
- Dublin Minor Football Championship Winners 1962, 1963, 1964, 1968, 1969
- Dublin Minor Football League Winners 1953, 1963, 1964
- Dublin Minor Football League Division 2 Winners 1977, 1982, 1992, 1994
- Dublin Minor Hurling C Championship Winners 2024
- Dublin Minor Hurling League Winners 1968, 2025
- Dublin Junior Hurling Championship Winners 1958
- Dublin Junior Hurling League Winners 1956
- Corn Ceitinn Hurling Cup Winners 1969
- Dublin Under 21 Football Championship Winners 1967
- Dublin Under 21 Football League Winners 1969
- Dublin Under 21 Football League Division 2 Winners 1977
- Dublin Under 21 Hurling League Division 1 Winners 1985
- Dublin Under 21 Hurling League Division 2 Winners 1978
- Dublin Senior Football League Division 2 Winners 1977
- Dublin AFL Div. 8 Winners 2015
- Dublin Senior Camogie Championship Winners 1989 Runners-Up 1982
- Dublin Intermediate A Camogie Championship Winners 1979, 1982
- Dublin Intermediate B Camogie Championship Winners 1978, 1980
- Dublin Junior B Camogie Championship Winners 1982
- Dublin Junior C Camogie Championship Winners 1980
- Dublin Junior C Camogie League Winners 1980
- Dublin Senior Hurling League Division 2 Winners 1992

== Notable former players ==
- Robbie Kelleher
- Tommy Naughton
- Larry Shannon
- Siobhán Killeen
