= St Kevin's Killians =

Gaelic games club in County Dublin, Ireland

- County: Dublin
- Colours: Green and white
- Grounds: Kingswood

Playing kits
Standard colours

St Kevin's Kilians (Irish: Naomh Caoimhín Cillian ) is a Gaelic Athletic Association (GAA) club based in the Kilnamanagh and Kingswood area of Dublin 24 in Ireland. The club was formed following the amalgamation of St Kevin's of Kilnamanagh and St Killian's of Kingswood. They primarily play Gaelic football. The junior football team play in Division 8 and the Junior D Football Championship. At juvenile level, they have under 8 and under 14 football teams. The club also fields a men's hurling team that started in 2020.

== Honours ==
- Duffy Cup winners: 2014
- Dublin AFL Div. 10S winners: 2014
- Jack O'Brien Cup winners: 2011, 2010
