= Na Gaeil Aeracha =

- Na Gaeil Aeracha
- Founded: 2020
- County: Dublin
- Nickname: The Rainbow Gaels
- Colours: Black and Pink
- Grounds: Marino Institute of Education, Dublin

Playing kits
Standard colours

Na Gaeil Aeracha GAA is a Gaelic Athletic Association (GAA) club that is based in Dublin in Ireland. It plays the majority of its games in Marino and in the Phoenix Park on Dublin's Northside. Founded in 2020, Na Gaeil Aeracha was the first explicitly LGBTQ+ inclusive GAA club in Ireland. It aims to promote inclusivity, diversity, and equality within Gaelic games. The club is open to all individuals regardless of gender identity, sexual orientation, or previous GAA experience. Na Gaeil Aeracha has fielded Ladies' Gaelic football (LGFA) teams since 2021, men's Gaelic football teams since 2022, and hurling since 2023.

As of 2024, the club fields adult men'sᕀ football, hurling, camogie, and LGFA teams.

== History ==
Na Gaeil Aeracha was established, between 2019 and 2020, with the aim of creating a more inclusive environment within the GAA which, according to some sources, has traditionally been "link[ed] with masculinity" and "like most sporting organisations, has struggled to break the 'taboo' relating to its LGBTQ+ members". Founded by a group from Dublin's LGBTQ+ community and allies, the club's Irish name, Na Gaeil Aeracha, translates to "The Gay Gaels" in English.

According to the club's website, it aims to promote "inclusivity, pride and comradery amongst our members" and to increase "awareness of issues and experiences for LGBTQ+ players in sport and look to provide a safe space for those looking to regain a love for our national sport".

== Teams ==
Na Gaeil Aeracha fields both men’sᕀ and women’sᕀ Gaelic football teams. The club provides opportunities for competitive play as well as social participation, catering to players of all skill levels. Since its foundation, the club has competed in various Dublin GAA leagues and tournaments. The club emphasizes skill development for newcomers while also offering a platform for more experienced players to engage in competitive matches.

The men's + football team compete in Division 11N of the Dublin football league and play in the Junior 2 Football Championship. The men's+ hurling team competes in the Dublin Junior G Hurling Championship.

== Honours ==
- Women's + Junior K
