= St Margaret's GAA =

Gaelic games club in County Dublin, Ireland

St Margaret's
- Cumann Naomh Mairead
- Founded: 1908
- County: Dublin
- Colours: Green and Gold
- Grounds: Blakestown Road

Playing kits
Standard colours

St Margaret's GAA is a Gaelic Athletic Association club based in the St. Margaret's area of north County Dublin, near Dublin Airport. The club, which was founded in 1908, has its grounds at Kilreesk. The club has 3 adult teams, a minor boys team, 4 ladies teams and 5 juvenile teams.

The club won the first of many Fingal Championships in 1928 and further victories followed in 1957, 1958, 1963, 1965, 1979, 1981, 1987, 1988 and 1994. During the late 1930s and early 1940s, St Margaret's had a three-in-a-row win in the Loving Cup from 1937 to 1939, and success in the Dublin Junior Football Championship in 1940. The latter brought St. Margaret's to Senior football, a grade in which they remained until 2003.

Further success was achieved when the St. Vincent de Paul was secured in 1962 and the Senior League Division 3 was won in 1985.

Several St. Margaret's players have represented Dublin over the years. Tom Markey won an All-Ireland Junior Football Championship medal, Sean Skelly won a National League medal in 1952 and Mick Cronin won an All-Ireland Minor Football Championship medal in 1954. Paddy Reilly and Mick Kennedy represented the Dublin senior team in later years.

== Honours ==
- Dublin Junior Football Championship (1): 1940
- Dublin AFL Div. 4 (1): 2018
- Dublin AFL Div. 10 (1): 2010
- Promoted from Division three in 2022
