= St Patrick's GAA (Donabate) =

Gaelic Athletic Association club in County Dublin, Ireland

St Patrick's, Donabate GAA
- Naomh Pádraig Domhnach Beathach
- Founded: 1924
- County: Dublin
- Colours: Green and Black
- Grounds: Robbie Farrell Park

Playing kits
Standard colours

Senior Club Championships
	All Ireland	Leinster champions	Dublin champions
Football:	0	0	0

St Patrick's, Donabate GAA is a Gaelic Athletic Association club in Donabate, County Dublin, Ireland.

== Club history ==
Prior to 1924, Gaelic football was played in Donabate and Portrane by the Stars of Fingal. In 1924 a new club was formed which took the name of the patron saint of the parish, Saint Patrick. In 2024 the club has 4 Men's football teams, 1 Hurling Team and 2 Ladies Football teams at adult level as well GAA, LGFA & Camogie underage teams.

One of the highlights of the club's history was the winning of the club's first Dublin Junior Football Championship in 1980, a feat repeated in 2008. More recently in the club's history it achieved 3 league promotions in a row from 2011 to 2014. Most notably winning Division 2 of the Dublin Adult Football League for the first time in 2013. An achievement then repeated in 2024. Three Players played in both seasons winning AFL2 Niall Collins, Conor Dowling and Adam Darby. In 1987 St Patrick's GAA club was named as Irelands highest achieving Minor Club (Under 1,000 Members)

2021 Was a momentous year for the club, as it saw its men's first team win the Dublin Intermediate Football Championship for the first time in the clubs history. It would see them play Senior Championship for the first time ever, in 2022.

== Facilities ==
The club's playing pitches are located in Robbie Farrell Park, Ballymastone, Donabate, Co Dublin. Great progress has been made in recent years through the establishment of a capital development fund. "Capital Club 250" encourages members to donate €21 per month, i.e. €250 per year, for the specific purpose of developing the club's facilities.

== Honours ==
- Dublin Intermediate Football Championship Winners 2021
- Dublin Junior Football Championship Winners 1980, 2008
- Dublin Junior All County Football Championships Winners 2020, 2021, 2024
- Dublin AFL Division 2 Winners 2013, 2024
- Dublin AFL Div. 6 Winners 2006
- Dublin AFL Div. 10 Winners 2014
