= Ballyboughal GAA =

Gaelic games club in County Dublin, Ireland

- Founded: 1935
- County: Dublin
- Colours: Green and White
- Grounds: Ballyboughal

Playing kits
Standard colours

Ballyboughal GAA is a Gaelic Athletic Association club based at Ballyboughal, Fingal, Ireland, serving Ballyboughal and its surrounding areas.

At adult level the club has two football teams competing in AFL2 and AFL9 and the Dublin Intermediate Football Championship and one ladies football team.

== Achievements ==
Ballyboughal have won the Dublin Intermediate Football Championship in 1968 1972 and 2019 and the Dublin Junior Football Championship in 1967 and 2009, the latter following a terrific win over neighbours Man O War when Dublin minor, Gerry Seaver, inspired them to victory. Club honours include:

- 1967 Dublin Junior Football Championship Winners
- 1968 Dublin Intermediate Football Championship Winner
- 1972 Dublin Intermediate Football Championship Winner
- 1991 Fingal Minor Football Championship Winner
- 2009 Dublin Junior Football Championship Winner
- 2009 Dublin AFL Div 5 Champions
- 2010 Dublin AFL Div 4 Champions

2019 Intermediate Football champions
