= Round Towers GAA (Lusk) =

Gaelic sports club in County Dublin, Ireland

Round Towers Lusk
- Na Cloigthithe, Lusca
- Founded: 1906
- County: Dublin
- Colours: Blue and White
- Grounds: Thomas Ashe Park
- Coordinates: 53.527924°N 6.178261°W

Playing kits
Standard colours

Round Towers Lusk is a Gaelic Athletic Association club based at Lusk, County Dublin, Ireland, serving Lusk and its surrounding areas.

As of 2019, the club fields teams from under 9's to under 18's for both boys and girls, while at adult level the club has three football teams competing in AFL2, AFL6 and AFL11N and the Dublin Senior Football Championship and one ladies football team. They have one Junior Hurling Team competing in AHL7

== History ==
Irish Volunteer Thomas Ashe founded the GAA club when a primary teacher in the local school. He died on hunger strike protesting inhuman treatment by British forces in Ireland in 1917.

== Achievements ==
- Dublin Junior Football Championship Winners 1962, 1992, 2015
- Dublin Intermediate Football Championship Winners 2018
- Dublin Junior 4 All County Football Championship Winners 2018
- Dublin Under 21 B Football Championship: Winner 2017
- Dublin AFL Div. 4 Winners 2016
- Dublin AFL Div. 5 Winners 2015
- Dublin AFL Div. 11 North Winners 2011
- Dublin Junior Hurling Championship: Winners 1951
- Dublin Senior B Football Championship: Winners 2019
