= Templeogue Synge Street GAA =

Football club in Dublin, Ireland

Templeogue
- Teach Mealóg Sráid Singe
- Founded: 1999
- County: Dublin
- Colours: Blue Yellow & White Hoops
- Grounds: Dolphin Park & Bushy Park
- Coordinates: 53°18′08.59″N 6°17′40.74″W

Playing kits
Standard colours

Templeogue Synge Street (Irish: Teach Mealóg Sráid Singe) is a Gaelic Athletic Association club based in Dublin, Ireland. Synge Street Past Pupils G.F.C was founded in 1945 and Templeogue G.F.C formed in 1978. The two clubs were merged in 1999. They won the Dublin Intermediate Football Championship in 2008 giving them a coveted spot in the Dublin Senior Football Championship for 2009. As of 2008, the club was playing in AFL 1, AFL 5 and AFL 9.

== Grounds ==
Dolphin Park is the club’s owned home ground. The club also extensively use Bushy Park for home matches. Dolphin Park originally belonged to Synge Street CBS but the club took over the ground on an 850 year lease in the early 2000s,.

In 2018, the club submitted plans to redevelop part of the grounds in order to generate funding to build a new, modern, two-storey clubhouse, floodlighting, all weather surfaces etc. The plans were initially rejected, in part because of a local campaign to maintain access to ever decreasing green spaces in the south inner city.

In November 2019, the plans were eventually approved on appeal and then following a judicial review the plans were finally ceased . New plans were submitted for a sporting only development in November 2022.

== Achievements ==
- Dublin Intermediate Football Championship: Winners 2008
- Dublin Senior Football Championship: Runners-Up 1977 (as Synge Street)
- Dublin AFL Division 2: Winners 2018
- Dublin AFL Div. 6: Winners 2014
- Dublin AFL Division 11S Winner 2012

== Notable players ==
- Niyi Adeolokun
- Denis Bastick
- Eoghan O'Gara
- Anton O'Toole
- Niall Scully

== See also ==
- Synge Street CBS
