= St Peregrine's GAA =

Gaelic games club in County Dublin, Ireland

Naomh Peregrine
- Cumann Naomh Peregrine
- Founded: 1978
- County: Dublin
- Colours: Black and White
- Grounds: Blakestown Road
- Coordinates: 53°23′40.77″N 6°24′17.30″W

Playing kits
Standard colours

St Peregrine's GAA, also known as Cumann Naomh Peregrine C.L.G., is a Gaelic Athletic Association club in Clonsilla, Fingal, Ireland.

== History ==
The club was founded in 1978 when a group of local people got together with Fr. Joe Madden of the Servite Order and decided to form a GAA club of their own.

== Description ==
The club caters for a range of age groups from four years upwards in the parishes of Hartstown, Huntstown, Porterstown, Blakestown and Mountview.

St Peregrine's has a 500-seater spectator stand, a gym, astro turf and sports hall. Local rivals include St Brigid's and Castleknock.

The adult football team competes in AFL3 and also competes in the Dublin Senior Football Championship, having won the IFC in 2006. The senior hurlers compete in AHL3 and the Intermediate Hurling Championship.

The club is humorously referred to as " The Penguins" because of its strip.

== Notable players ==
- Eric Lowndes
- David McGovern - Leitrim inter-county hurler
- Conor Hynes - under-20 Dublin squad member

== Honours ==
- Dublin Intermediate A Camogie Championship: Winners 2022
- Dublin LGFA Junior B Football Championship: Winners 2021
- Dublin Intermediate Football Championship: Winners 2006
- Dublin Junior Football Championship: Winners 1998
- Dublin AFL Div. 6: Winners 2012, 2015
- Dublin AFL Div. 9: Winners 2007
- Dublin AFL Div. 11N: Winners 2013
- Dublin Minor D Hurling Championship Winners 2017
- 1999 League Winners and Cup Winners , The Junior A team, managers Paul Harte and Owen Gilhooley.
- Dublin AFL Div. 11B: Winners 2026
