= St Mary's GAA (Dublin) =

Sports club in County Dublin, Ireland

- Naomh Mhuire CLG
- Founded: 1906
- County: Dublin
- Nickname: Marys
- Colours: Blue and Green
- Grounds: Saggart
- Coordinates: 53°16′45″N 6°26′31″W

Playing kits
Standard colours

Senior Club Championships
	All Ireland	Leinster champions	Dublin champions
Football:	0	0	1

St Mary's is a Gaelic Athletic Association club based in Saggart, County Dublin, Ireland. Founded in 1906, Mary's have won the Dublin Senior Football Championship on one occasion in 1921. Since then they had been relegated to the Dublin Intermediate Football Championship and regained their senior status in 1976 and have remained a Senior club ever since. St Mary's currently play in the Dublin AFL Division 1.

Five St Mary's players were on the Dublin team which won the 1942 All Ireland Final against Galway. The five players were Paddy Bermingham, Gerry Fitzgerald, Peter O'Reilly, Caleb Crone and Paddy O'Connor. Caleb Crone also won an All-Ireland medal with Cork in 1945.

== Honours ==
- Dublin Intermediate Football Championship (1): 1976
- Dublin Junior Football Championship (1): 2002
- Dublin Senior Football League Division 1 (1): 2004
- Dublin AFL Division 2 (1): 1993
- Dublin AFL Division 3 (2): 2021, 2022

== Notable players ==
- Caleb Crone
