= St Anne's GAA (Dublin) =

Gaelic games club in County Dublin, Ireland

St Anne's
- Cumann Naomh Áine
- Founded: 1937
- County: Dublin
- Colours: Blue and White
- Grounds: Bohernabreena, Dublin 24

Playing kits
Standard colours

St Anne's is a Gaelic Athletic Association club in Bohernabreena, Dublin, Ireland.

It was founded in 1937 and caters for a range of age groups from four years upwards in the areas of Tallaght and Firhouse.

== Honours ==
- Dublin Senior Football Championship Runner-Up 1987
- Dublin Senior Football League Winners 1989
- Dublin Intermediate Football Championship (2) 1964, 1985, Runner-up 2025
- Dublin Junior B Football Championship: Winners 2024
- Dublin Junior D Football Championship: Winners 2011
- Dublin Junior F Football Championship: Winners 2025
- Dublin Minor C Football Championship: Winners (2) 2009, 2024
- Dublin AFL Div. 7: Winners 2025
- Dublin AFL Div. 10S Winners 2009
