= 2007 Dublin Senior Football Championship =

- 2007 Craobh Sinsear Peile; Bhaile Átha Cliath

Tournament details
- County: Dublin
- Year: 2007

Winners
- Champions: St Vincents (25th win)
- Manager: Mickey Whelan

Promotion/Relegation
- Promoted team(s): Fingal Ravens
- Relegated team(s): Garda

This is a round-up of all the latest in the 2007 Dublin Senior Football Championship which began on 18 April 2007 when Garda took on champions UCD at Parnell Park. UCD had finished the 2006 championship by beating St Vincents in the final. St Vincents managed to better their 2006 performance by beating St Brigids in the final at Parnell Park.

== Round 1 ==
St Sylvesters were the first team to qualify for the second round as Erins Hope failed to field a team for the game. Defending champions UCD began their title race with a one-sided victory over Garda. St Judes beat Ballymun Kickhams convincingly and went on to the second round. Naomh Maur defeated O'Tooles sending them straight to the backdoor round and Naomh Mearnóg defeated their Fingal rivals Fingallians with Cillian O'Driscoll scoring a total of five frees for Mearnóg. Ballyboden will hope to do better than their fourth round appearance in 2006 as they cruised past Trinity Gaels. Raheny defeated Parnells despite a late attempt by the opposition. St Marys beat Whitehall Colmcille with a late goal by substitute Kenneth Kelly. Former Sligo forward T Brennan impressed with seven points in Lucan Sarsfields four point win over St Annes. Na Fianna had a comfortable five point win over St Marks and St Brigids crushed a lacklustre Round Towers. Kilmacud Crokes beat St Vincents by two goals in what proved to be a disappointing game between two of Dublins highest rated teams. Plunkett's forward line proved too hot to handle for a gutsy Olaf's with solid performances from Alan Brogan and Jason Sherlock. Last years Intermediate champions St Peregrines lost their first senior game to Naomh Barróg. Ballinteer St Johns cruised into the second round with a victory over Clontarf. Thomas Davis went on to play in the backdoor round against St Vincents as they lost to Erins Isle who progress to the next stage.

=== Structure ===
The winners of their respective first-round games went on to qualify for the second round, the losers were given a second chance in a backdoor system which gave them a place in the third round when they won their backdoor tie.

=== Fixtures ===
Game	Date	Venue	Winner	Score	Loser	Score
Dublin SFC; First round	18 April	Portmarnock	St Sylvesters	0-00	Erins Hope	0-00
Dublin SFC; First round	18 April	Parnell Park	UCD; S Lennon 1-6 (0-4f, 0-1 '45'), D Gilhooley 1-2, C O'Dwyer 1-1 each, P Kelly 1-0, F Canavan 0-2, A Fennelly, B Collins, D Bailey, D O'Connor 0-1 each.	4-15	Garda; W Skelly (0-1f), M Houlihan (0-1f) 0-1 each.	0-02
Dublin SFC; First round	18 April	Parnell Park	St Judes; D Donnelly 1-2, E Crennan 0-4, K McManamon 0-2 (0-1f), P Cunningham, S Earley, J Donnelly 0-1 each.	1-11	Ballymun Kickhams; K Leahy 0-3 (0-2f), P Christie, R Shorthall, T Furman 0-1 each.	0-06
Dublin SFC; First round	19 April	Naul	Naomh Maur; G Archer 1-1, C McGuire 1-0, C Moore 0-3, C Carty 0-2, J Sweetman, R McGinty, A Kelly 0-1 each.	2-09	O'Toole's; M Thompson 0-2 (0-2f), D Mooney, E Fennell, W O'Connor, G Coughlan 0-1 each.	0-06
Dublin SFC; First round	19 April	Páirc Barróg	Naomh Mearnóg; Cillian O'Driscoll 0-6 (0-5f), Colm O'Driscoll, A Kenny 0-2 each, R O'Driscoll, S Ryan, R O'Reilly, A Shepherd 0-1 each.	0-14	Fingallians; P Lawless 0-8 (0-6f), P Flynn 1-0, D Campion, D Farrell, P Murtagh 0-1 each.	1-10
Dublin SFC; First round	20 April	Blunden Drive	Raheny; C Donegan 0-5 (0-3f), D Ryan 0-3, M O'Keeffe, J Keogh 0-2 each, D Henry, C Whelan, S Dempsey 0-1 each.	0-15	Parnells; S Mills 1-2 (0-1f), M Whelan 0-2, P Keogh, J Peyton, W Henry 0-1 each.	1-07
Dublin SFC; First round	20 April	Blakestown	Ballyboden St Endas; N Clarke 1-1, A Kerin 0-4 (0-1f), S Hiney 1-0, K Naughton, P Galvin 0-3 each, S Lambert, C Keaney (0-1f) 0-2 each, C Moran 0-1.	2-16	Trinity Gaels; B O'Brien (0-1f), E McInerney 0-3 each, G Dillon 0-2, D Sheridan, D McCormack 0-1 each.	0-10
Dublin SFC; First round	21 April	O'Toole Park	St Marys (Saggart); K Kelly 1-0, S Cooke (2f), D McConn (2f) 0-3 each, D Brennan, D Corrigan, L Magee 0-1 each.	1-09	Whitehall Colmcille; C Byrne 1-1 (0-1f), L O'Donovan 0-2 (0-1f), S O'Sullivan, J Morrissey 0-1 each.	1-05
Dublin SFC; First round	21 April	Parnell Park	St Brigids; Paddy Andrews 0-6 (0-2f), B Cahill 1-1, M Galvin, L McCarthy 1-0 each, D Lally 0-2, J Noonan, D Cahill, G Norton, O McCann, M Cahill 0-1 each.	3-14	Round Towers (C); Derek Byrne 0-3 (0-3f), C Corrigan 0-2, T Mulligan 0-1.	0-06
Dublin SFC; First round	21 April	Parnell Park	CLG Na Fianna; M O Collarain 1-2, B O Collarain (0-2f), S Connell 0-3 each, M Jerocki 0-2, J Boland, B Downes, R O'Hagan, N Cooper 0-1 each.	1-14	St Mark's; B Kennedy 0-9 (0-4f, 0-3 '45'), S McCann, D O'Callaghan, J Kelly 0-1 each.	0-12
Dublin SFC; First round	21 April	O'Toole Park	Lucan Sarsfields; T Brennan 0-7 (0-5f), J O'Neill 0-3, M Daly, B Gallagher 0-2 each, D Gallagher, F O'Hare, M Casey 0-1 each.	0-17	St Anne's; N Bergin 1-4 (1-0 pen, 0-3 f), D Watson 0-2, K Costello, T Connolly, C O'Gara, A McNally 0-1 each.	1-10
Dublin SFC; First round	22 April	Parnell Park	Kilmacud Crokes; R Cosgrove, M Vaughan (0-1f), D Kelleher 1-1 each, J Magee 0-2 (0-1f), L Og O hEineachain, D Magee 0-1.	3-07	St Vincent's; T Quinn 1-6 (0-4f, 0-1 '45'), D Connolly 0-1 (0-1f).	1-07
Dublin SFC; First round	22 April	O'Toole Park	Erins Isle; L Sweetman (0-1f), N Crossan (2f) 0-4 each, K Dunne, D Collins 0-1 each.	0-10	Thomas Davis; S Smith 0-5 (0-3f), J O'Connor 0-2, J Owens, C Farrelly 0-1 each.	0-09
Dublin SFC; First round	22 April	O'Toole Park	Ballinteer St Johns; P O'Connor 1-4, D Goggins 1-1, D O'Brien 1-0, F Ward 0-2 (2f), J McNally (`45'), S McCann, C Goggins 0-1 each.	3-10	Clontarf; D O'Brien 1-2, S McIntyre 1-1 (0-1f), P Curran 0-2 (0-1f), S Cohen, K Devine, S Barrett 0-1 each.	2-08
Dublin SFC; First round	22 April	Parnell Park	St Oliver Plunketts ER; G Smith 0-6 (0-1f), J Sherlock, A Brogan 0-5 each, B Brogan 1-2, L Fleming 0-1.	1-19	Naomh Olaf; E Kinsella 1-4 (1-0 pen, 0-1f), F Purcell 1-2, E Christian 0-2, P Feehan, K Lynch 0-1 each.	2-10
Dublin SFC; First round	22 April	Lawless Park	Naomh Barróg; R Croft 0-3 (0-3f), E Bennis 0-2, N Carey (0-1 `45'), E Duggan, P Croft, D O'Sullivan, J O'Rourke 0-1 each.	0-10	St Peregrines; J Dowling, M Barden (3f) 0-3 each, D Byrne, D Rooney 0-1 each.	0-08

== Backdoor ==
O'Tooles were the first team to be knocked of the Dublin Senior Football Championship and will now enter the relegation playoffs. Round Towers went on to qualify for the third round where they would meet one of the losers from the second round. Dublin AFL Division 1 champions Thomas Davis were knocked out of the Dublin championship by St Vincents who progressed to the third round.

=== Structure ===
All of the losing teams from round one face each other in the backdoor round. The losers of these backdoor games are knocked out of the championship and go on to play in the relegation playoffs. The winning teams go on to qualify for the third round which also includes the losers of the second round games.

=== Fixtures ===
Game	Date	Venue	Winner	Score	Loser	Score
Dublin SFC; Backdoor	N/A	N/A	St Marks/Bye	N/A	Erins Hope/Withdrew	N/A
Dublin SFC; Backdoor	2 May	Parnell Park	Round Towers (C); Derek Byrne 0-5 (0-5f), T Mulligan 0-3, C Corrigan 0-2, S McGibney, M Taylor 0-1 each.	0-12	O'Tooles; R Dinh 0-4 (0-3f), P O’Donoghue, G Coughlan, G O’Meara (0-1f), G Morris 0-1 each.	0-09
Dublin SFC; Backdoor	3 May	Blakestown	St Annes; N Bergin 2-5 (0-4f), T Connolly 0-1.	2-06	Ballymun Kickhams; I Robertson (0-1f), K Leahy, D Ducie, O Clinton 0-2 each, P McMahon, M Leahy, S Condon (0-1f), T Furman 0-1 each.	0-12
Dublin SFC; Backdoor Replay	7 May	Blakestown	Ballymun Kickhams; E Christie 0-6 (0-3f), K Leahy 0-4 (0-3f), P McMahon 0-3, I Robertson 0-1.	0-14	St Annes; N Bergin 1-2 (0-2f), D Fullam, J Nolan (0-1f) 0-2 each, C Brady, D Watson, A McNally 0-1 each.	1-09
Dublin SFC; Backdoor	3 May	Lawless Park	Whitehall Colmcille; C Beirne 0-5 (0-1f), G Beirne 0-3, B Morrissey, J Bridgeman, J Morrissey 0-2 each, L O'Donovan, S O'Sullivan, D Joyce 0-1 each.	0-17	Naomh Olaf; E Kinsella 1-2 (0-1f), F Purcell 0-4 (0-3f), E Christian 0-1.	1-07
Dublin SFC; Backdoor	4 May	Parnell Park	St Vincents; T Quinn 0-4 (0-2f), B Maloney 0-2, P Kelly, H Coughlan, D Connolly (0-1f), P Gilroy, S Loughlin 0-1 each.	0-11	Thomas Davis; S Smith 0-6 (0-3f), S O'Connor, S McGrath 0-1 each.	0-08
Dublin SFC; Backdoor	5 May	Portmarnock	Trinity Gaels; B O'Brien 0-6 (0-2f), P Coyne 1-1, G Dillon 0-2, M Forde, D Kelly 0-1 each.	1-11	Clontarf; P Curran, S Barrett 0-3 each, D O'Brien, S McIntyre 0-2 each, N Shanahan, K Devine 0-1 each.	0-12
Dublin SFC; Backdoor	5 May	Naul	Fingallians; P Lawless 1-7 (0-2f), P Flynn 1-0, C Farrell 0-3 (1f), D Farrell, G Hyde 0-1 each.	2-12	St Peregrines; B McCarthy 2-0, C McGuinness 0-6 (0-1f), D Byrne (f), M Barden, J Dowling 0-1 each.	2-09
Dublin SFC; Backdoor	5 May	Portmarnock	Parnells; J Peyton, M Whelan (0-4f) 0-4 each, S Cluxton 0-2 (0-1 '45'), G Dowling 0-1.	0-11	Garda; W Skelly 0-3, B O'Connor 0-2 (0-2f), M Houlihan 0-1.	0-06

== Round 2 ==
The first team to go on to the fourth round were Ballyboden St Endas with an easy victory Naomh Mearnóg who join St Marks in the third round. Kilmacud Crokes sent St Sylvesters into the third round in a one sided game with a Ray Cosgrove scoring an impressive 2-03. Na Fianna sent Lucan Sarsfields into the third round with solid performances from Dublin hurlers Tomás Brady and Joey Boland. Erins Isle had a surprise one sided win over Naomh Maur which sends them into the fourth round of the Dublin Championship. Last year's champions had a tight game against St Marys, Saggart which resulted in UCD eventually winning the game by one point. St Judes had a comfortable win over Raheny to take them on to the fourth round with a strong performance by K McMenamin. It took a late goal from David Matthews to give Plunketts a two-point win over northside rivals St Brigids. Ballinteer progress despite a late comeback attempt by Naomh Barróg.

=== Structure ===
All teams who won in the first round were drawn against each other in the second round. The winning teams from this round go on to qualify for the fourth round of the Dublin championship. The losing teams go on to play in the third round against the winners of the backdoor round.

=== Fixtures ===
Game	Date	Venue	Winner	Score	Loser	Score
Dublin SFC; Second round	1 May	O'Toole Park	Ballyboden St Endas; A Kerin 1-3 (0-2f), C Keaney 1-2, S Lambert, P Galvin 0-3 each, S Durkin, D O'Mahony 0-2 each, S Hiney, C Moran 0-1 each.	2-17	Naomh Mearnóg; R O'Reilly, A Sheppard (0-1f), S Ryan (snr), Colm O'Driscoll, S Ryan (snr) 0-1 each.	0-05
Dublin SFC; Second round	2 May	Blakestown	Na Fianna; B Colleran 0-5 (0-3f), J Boland 0-4 (0-1 `45'), D Farrell 1-0, S Connell 0-2, B Courtney, M Colleran 0-1 each.	1-13	Lucan Sarsfields; T Brennan 0-5 (0-3f), M Daly 1-1, B Gallagher 0-2, C O'Neill, D O'Shaughnessy 0-1 each.	1-10
Dublin SFC; Second round	2 May	O'Toole Park	UCD; S Lennon 0-6 (0-4f), C O Dwyer 0-3, D Gillhooley 0-2, B Collins 0-1.	0-12	St Marys, Saggart; S Cooke 0-4 (0-4f), L Magee 1-0, D McConn 0-2 (0-2f), B Kelly, S Kelly 0-1 each.	1-08
Dublin SFC; Second round	2 May	Naul	Erins Isle; N Crossan 2-1, L Sweetman 1-4 (0-1f, 0-1 `45'), T Gorman, P Murray 1-0 each, P McCluskey, N Carty 0-1 each.	5-07	Naomh Maur; C Moore 0-3 (1f), A Kelly 0-2, C Carty (f), R McGinty 0-1 each.	0-08
Dublin SFC; Second round	2 May	Parnell Park	Kilmacud Crokes; R Cosgrove 2-3, M Vaughan 1-1, L Og O hEineachain, D Kelleher 0-3 each, K Nolan, M Davoren 1-0 each, D Walsh, P Duggan, D Magee, C O’Sullivan, N Corkery 0-1 each.	5-15	St Sylvesters; M Ryan, R Cleere (0-1f) 0-2 each, A Relihan (0-1f), N Coughlan 0-1 each.	0-06
Dublin SFC; Second round	3 May	O'Toole Park	St Judes; K McMenamin 0-5 (0-2f), B McMenamin, S Earley 0-2 each, N O'Shea, P Cunningham, J Donnelly (0-1f), D Donnelly, R McDermott 0-1 each.	0-14	Raheny; L Eviston 0-3 (0-3f), C Whelan 0-2, D Henry, C Donegan (f), M O'Keeffe 0-1 each.	0-08
Dublin SFC; Second round	4 May	O'Toole Park	Ballinteer St Johns; F Ward 1-3 (0-2f, 1-0 pen), S McCann 1-1, P McGlynn 1-1, J Oliver, C Ward, C Goggins 0-1 each.	3-08	Naomh Barróg; J O'Rourke 2-3 (0-1f), A O'Grady 1-0, B Hehir, F Dennis, N Carey 0-1 (0-1f) each.	3-06
Dublin SFC; Second round	4 May	Parnell Park	St Oliver Plunketts/ER; A Brogan (0-3f), G Smith (0-3f) 0-3 each, D Matthews 1-0, R McConnell 0-1.	1-07	St Brigids; Paddy Andrews 0-3 (0-3f), D Lally 0-2, Martin Cahill, O McCann, L McCarthy 0-1 each.	0-08

== Round three ==
=== Structure ===
This round was restricted by a rule that did not allow two clubs who had met earlier in the championship to meet again. Therefore, there was no chance given for a repeat of a previous encounter. Round 3 consisted of 16 teams, comprising the eight losers from Round 2 plus the eight winners from the backdoor system. So, it comprised eight games and eight of the winners progressed to the fourth round. All of the losing teams from round three were eliminated from the Dublin championship but had successfully retained their senior status for 2008 competition.

=== Fixtures ===
St Marks were the only team to qualify for the third round after only playing one game, due to the withdrawal of Erins Hope from the previous backdoor round. Trinity Gaels, Naomh Maur, Lucan Sarsfields, Naomh Mearnóg, Raheny, Naomh Barróg, St Sylvesters and Fingallians were knocked out at the third round stage. St Marks, St Marys, Saggart, Whitehall Colmcille, Round Towers, Clondalkin, Ballymun Kickhams, St Vincents, Parnells and St Brigids progressed to the fourth round.

Game	Date	Venue	Winner	Score	Loser	Score
Dublin SFC; Third round	19 July	Blakestown	St Marks; J Kelly 0-7 (0-1f), S Tynan, B Shovlin 1-0 each, S McCann, C Duffy 0-2 each, M Lucas 0-1.	2-12	Naomh Maur; C Maguire 1-1, D Caffrey, G Kirk (0-1f) 0-3 each, C Carty, A Kelly (0-1f) 0-2 each, C Sweetman, J Sweetman, R McGinty 0-1 each.	1-14
Dublin SFC; Third round	19 July	Parnell Park	St Marys, Saggart; S Cooke 1-3 (0-3f), D McConn 0-5 (0-2f), G Finn 1-2, A Marshall 0-2, S Walsh, F Boland, P Courtney, D Byrne, L Magee 0-1 each.	2-17	Trinity Gaels; B O'Brien 1-3 (1-0 pen, 0-2f), M Forde, E McInerney 1-1 each, G Dillon 0-1.	3-06
Dublin SFC; Third round	21 July	Parnell Park	Whitehall Colmcille; L O'Donovan 1-3, D Joyce 0-4 (0-2f), E McCarthy, A Holly, P McNamee, C Beirne 0-1 each.	1-11	Lucan Sarsfields; T Brennan 0-5 (0-1f), S O'Shaughnessy 1-0, J O'Neill 0-2 (0-1f), D Gallagher, P Casey, B Gallagher 0-1 each.	1-10
Dublin SFC; Third round	21 July	Parnell Park	St Brigids; K Bonner 0-9, D Lally 2-2, J Noonan 0-2, C O'Sullivan, A Daly, Martin Cahill (0-1f), Peadar Andrews, K Darcy, Paddy Andrews 0-1 each.	2-19	Fingallians; P Lawless 0-7 (0-2f, 0-1 '45'), C Farrell 0-2 (0-2f), D Sinnott 0-1.	0-10
Dublin SFC; Third round	22 July	Blakestown	Naomh Mearnóg; Cillian O'Driscoll 0-3(0-1f), Shane Ryan jr, A Kenny, R O'Driscoll 0-1 each.	0-06	Round Towers (C); M Hallows 1-2, Derek Byrne 0-4 (0-4f), J O'Brien 0-2, Damien Murray, M Taylor, T Mulligan 0-1 each.	1-11
Dublin SFC; Third round	22 July	Parnell Park	Raheny; D Ryan 1-3, D Henry (0-1f), M O'Keeffe 0-2 each, D Pelly, J Keogh 0-1 each.	1-09	Ballymun Kickhams; K Leahy 0-6 (0-2f, 0-1 '45'), T Furman 1-2, E Lee 0-2, J Burke, B McCullagh, P McMahon 0-1 each.	1-13
Dublin SFC; Third round	22 July	Blunden Drive	Naomh Barróg; P Whelan 0-3, N Duggan, F Dennis, D O'Sullivan, E Bennis (0-1f) 0-1 each.	0-07	St Vincents; D Connolly 1-3 (0-1f), K Golden 0-5 (0-3f), P Kelly 0-2, B Maloney, T Quinn (0-1f), P Gilroy 0-1 each.	1-13
Dublin SFC; Third round	22 July	Parnell Park	St Sylvesters; J Coughlan 0-3, N Cleere, S Keogh, M Ryan, N Coughlan 0-1 each.	0-08	Parnells; M Whelan 0-3, P Keogh, A Cromwell, J Peyton, S Mills, S Cluxton (0-1 '45') 0-1 each.	0-09

== Relegation Round ==
Game	Date	Venue	Team A	Score	Team B	Score
Dublin SFC; Relegation Playoff Quarter-final	7 October	O'Toole Park	Garda	1-07	St Annes	2-06
Dublin SFC; Relegation Playoff Quarter-final	7 October	O'Toole Park	Naomh Olaf	2-07	Thomas Davis	2-13
Dublin SFC; Relegation Playoff Quarter-final	5 December	Druimnigh	O'Tooles GAC	1-18	Clontarf	0-06
Dublin SFC; Relegation Playoff Semi-final	5 December	Parnell Park	St Peregrines	1-11	Garda	1-07
Dublin SFC; Relegation Playoff Semi-final	16 December	Parnell Park	Naomh Olaf	1-06	Clontarf	2-05
Dublin SFC; Relegation Playoff Final	27 January	Parnell Park	Naomh Olaf	1-11	Garda	0-08

== Round Four ==
=== Structure ===
The fourth round will feature eight matches between the final sixteen teams left in the championship. The round will comprise the eight winners from round two and the eight winners from round 3. The winners of the second round were drawn against the third-round winners; they were separated by two distinct lots meaning the second-round winners were kept apart from third-round winners in the fourth-round draw. The eight winners progress to quarter-finals of the Dublin Senior Football Championship. The eight losers were knocked out of the 2007 competition, to return in the Dublin championship. The fourth round was drawn on 30 July, with times and date to be decided based on Dublin's progress in the 2007 All-Ireland Senior Football Championship.

=== Fixtures ===
The Dublin senior football champions maintained their 2006 form by beating Round Towers of Clondalkin to set up a quarter final clash with St Brigids who beat Erins Isle by six points.

Game	Date	Venue	Winner	Score	Loser	Score
Dublin SFC; Fourth round	22 September	O'Toole Park	Kilmacud Crokes; M Vaughan 1-10 (0-6f, 0-1 sline); M Davoren 1-0; B McGrath, L og O hEinneachain, N Corkery, D Kelleher, R Cosgrove 0-1 each.	2-15	St Marys, Saggart; D McConn (0-2f), S Cooke (0-2f) 0-2 each; L McGee (0-1f) 0-1.	0-05
Dublin SFC; Fourth round	21 September	Parnell Park	UCD; S Lennon 0-9 (0-5f), P Kelly 1-0, D Gilhooley, C O'Dwyer 0-2 each, W Minchin 0-1.	1-14	Round Towers, Clondalkin; Derek Murray 1-1, J O'Brien 0-3 (2f), D Byrne 0-2 (0-2f), S McGibney, C Corrigan 0-1 each.	1-08
Dublin SFC; Fourth round	22 September	Parnell Park	Na Fianna; S Connell (0-1f), K O'Neill 0-2 each, R O'Hagan, K McGeeney, J Boland, B Colleran 0-1 each.	0-08	St Vincents; T Quinn (0-2f), K Golden 0-2 each, P Conlon, T Diamond, N Billings, B Maloney, D Connolly 0-1 each.	0-09
Dublin SFC; Fourth round	22 September	Parnell Park	St Oliver Plunketts/ER; G Smith 1-5 (0-5f), B Brogan 0-4, J Sherlock 0-3, P Brogan 1-0, C Brennan, D Sweeney 0-1 each.	2-14	Parnells; S Cluxton 0-3 (0-2f, 0-1 45), B Byrne 0-2, M Whelan (0-1 pen) 0-2, P Keogh, A Cromwell.	0-09
Dublin SFC; Fourth round	21 September	Parnell Park	Erins Isle; N Crossan 0-3 (0-1f), P Murray 1-0, D Moher 0-2 (2f), L Sweetman 0-1.	1-06	St Brigids; R Gallagher 0-7 (0-4f), Paddy Andrews 0-4, G Norton, A Daly, D Lally, F Condron 0-1 each.	0-15
Dublin SFC; Fourth round	22 September	O'Toole Park	Ballyboden St Endas; C Keaney 0-9 (0-3f); A Kerin 1-1 (0-1f); K Naughton, S Durkin, C Moran, S Lambert 0-1 each.	1-14	Ballymun Kickhams; K Leahy 0-8 (0-5f, 0-1 sline); P McMahon 1-0; S Lawlor, T Furman 0-1 each.	1-10
Dublin SFC; Fourth round	19 September	Iveagh Grounds	St Judes; K McMenamon 2-4, S Cunningham, E Crennan 0-3 each, J Donnelly 0-2 (0-1f), S Early, P Harlow, C Murphy 0-1 each.	2-15	St Marks; D Kearns (0-1f, 0-1 sline), C Ferguson 0-2 each, S McCann 0-1.	0-05
Dublin SFC; Fourth round	19 September	Páirc Naomh Uinsionn	Ballinteer St Johns; D Goggins 1-2, S McCambridge, S McCann (0-1f), F Ward, B Gibbons 0-1 each.	1-06	Whitehall Colmcille; D Joyce 0-6 (0-3f, 0-1 45), L O'Donovan 0-3, J Bridgeman 0-2, S Sharpe (0-1f), C Beirne (0-1f), G Beirne, J Morrissey 0-1 each.	0-15

== Quarter and Semi-finals ==
=== Fixtures ===
Game	Date	Venue	Winner	Score	Loser	Score
Dublin SFC; Quarter-final	6 October	Parnell Park	Whitehall Colmcille; C Beirne 0-4 (0-2f, 0-1, '45'), G Beirne (0-1 '45'), D Joyce 0-3 each, J Morrissey 0-2.	0-12	St Vincents; T Quinn 2-4 (0-2f, 0-1 '45'), N Billings 1-2, P Kelly 1-0, D Connolly, B Maloney 0-2 each, T Doyle, H Coughlan, T Diamond, C Brady, M Loftus 0-1 each.	4-15
Dublin SFC; Quarter-final	7 October	Parnell Park	UCD; S Lennon 1-4 (0-3f), C O’Dwyer 1-1.	2-05	St Brigids; R Gallagher 0-3 (0-3f), K Bonner, L McCarthy 0-2 each, C Lynch, A Daly, B Cahill, Paddy Andrews, K Darcy (f) 0-1 each.	0-12
Dublin SFC; Quarter-final	7 October	Parnell Park	Kilmacud Crokes; M Vaughan 0-8 (0-6f, 0-1 '45', 0-1 pen), P Griffin, P Burke, L Óg Ó hÉineacháin 0-1 each.	0-11	Ballyboden St Endas; A Kerin 1-2 (0-1f), D O'Mahony, S Lambert, C Keaney (0-1f) 0-1 each.	1-05
Dublin SFC; Quarter-final	7 October	O'Toole Park	St Oliver Plunkett/ER; B Brogan 0-4, G Smith (0-2f), A Brogan 0-2 each; M Brides, D Sweeney, J Sherlock, J Brogan 0-1 each.	0-11	St Judes; J Donnelly 2-0, K McManamon 0-4 (0-3f), B McManamon 0-2, S Cunningham 0-1.	2-07
Dublin SFC; Semi-final	18 October	Parnell Park	St Judes; J Donnelly 0-3 (0-3f), K McMenamin 0-2 (0-1f), J Reilly, R McDermott 0-1 each.	0-07	St Brigids; R Gallagher 0-6 (0-4f), K Bonner 1-2, Paddy Andrews 0-2, B Cahill 0-1.	1-11
Dublin SFC; Semi-final	18 October	Parnell Park	Kilmacud Crokes; L Og O hEineachain 1-3 (1-0 pen), M Vaughan 0-4 (0-2f, 0-1 45), N Behan 1-0, K Nolan, R Cosgrove 0-1 each.	0-09	St Vincents; T Quinn 1-6 (1-0 pen, 0-3f), B Maloney 1-1, D Connolly 0-2 (901f), M O'Shea, P Gilroy 0-1 each.	2-08

== Last Eight Layout ==
Quarterfinals
Whitehall Colmcille 0-14
St Vincents 4-15
Kilmacud Crokes 0-11
Ballyboden St Endas 1-5
UCD 2-5
St Brigids 0-12
St Judes 2-7
St Oliver Plunkett/ER 0-12

Semifinals
St Vincents 2-11
Kilmacud Crokes 2-09
St Brigids 1-11
St Judes 0-07

Final
St Vincents	0-12
St Brigids	1-07

== Dublin Senior Football final ==
St Vincent's	0-12 - 1-07 (final score after 70 minutes)	St Brigids
Manager:Mickey Whelan Team: M. Savage; P. Conlon; E. Brady; H. Gill; T. Doyle; G. Brennan; P. Kelly; H. Coughlan; M. O'Shea; K. Golden 0-02; T. Diamond; N. Billings 0-01; B. Maloney 0-02; Diarmuid Connolly 0-03; T Quinn 0-04 Substitutes: P Gilroy for H Coughlan; C Brady for N Billings	Half-time: 0-06 - 1-02 Competition: Dublin Senior Football Championship (Final) Date: 20.00 BST; Monday 29 October 2007 Venue: Parnell Park, Dublin Attendance: Referee: Gary McCormack Match rules: 60 minutes. Replay if scores still level. Maximum of 5 substitutions.	Manager: Team: P. Keane; M. Cahill 0-01; D. Cahill; A Daly; G Norton; D. Lally 0-01; P. Andrews; K. Darcy; B. Cahill; M. Cahill; D Dineen; M Galvin; P. Andrews 1-01; K. Bonner 0-01; R. Gallagher 0-02 Substitutes: J Noonan (0-1) for D Cahill. C Lynch for D Dineen; L McCarthy for M Cahill
