= Erin go Bragh GAA =

Dublin-based Gaelic Athletic Association club

Erin Go Bragh
- Founded: 1986
- County: Dublin
- Nickname: the braghs
- Colours: Green and White
- Grounds: Hunters Run, Hazelbury Park, St. Catherines Park
- Coordinates: 53°24′04″N 6°25′41″W

Playing kits
Standard colours

Erin go Bragh GAA are a Dublin-based Gaelic Athletic Association (GAA) club based in Clonee, Littlepace/Castaheaney/Ongar district in Dublin 15 in Ireland. As of 2023, the club was fielding one team in junior Gaelic football (AFL 8 and Junior 2 Championship), one junior hurling team (AHL 8 and Junior F Championship) and one Ladies Gaelic Football team. The club also has a boys and girls juvenile section fielding from Under 8-minor in football, hurling and camogie.

== History ==
=== Early days ===
1887–1917

The name "Erin go Bragh" (deriving from the Irish meaning "Ireland forever") in Dublin GAA dates back to 1887. The club was founded in 1887 in Clonsilla. It was one of 120 clubs affiliated in Dublin in 1888. The club was active until 1890 when, like a number of GAA clubs in Dublin at the time, it was disbanded.

The club name is rarely found afterward but was re-organised on several occasions. A club named Erin go Bragh competed in the Sunday Junior Football League from 1904 to 1909. The name of the club was often misspelt in results and fixtures section of papers, most commonly as Eire go bragh and at other times as Erin go Brath. The club had two football teams, one in the Junior B Division and the second in an Under Junior Division in 1905 and 1906. Erin go Bragh were Junior league runners up in 1906 defeating Stars of Erin at Jones Road (now Croke Park) for the runners-up medals. Reorganisation of the league structures in 1907 meant that the club's first team competed in the Intermediate Division and their second team in the Junior C Division. Erin go Bragh was one of ten clubs with representation in an inter-league Dublin junior football team who played Cork in a challenge at Jones Road in 1907. Thomas C. Murphy of Erin go Bragh was the first ever Dublin inter-league captain and Stephen Lynch also played for Dublin against Cork and later Louth. The club competed until 1909, when it suddenly disbanded and despite efforts to revive the club in 1910, Erin go Bragh remained absent from the field of play until 1917.

1917–1943

The club was again reorganised in 1917, fielding a single team at Junior level and in 1918 expanded to two teams: one at junior, the second at minor level.

In 1919, Erin go Bragh fielded a single team but also began competing in cross country running (their involvement coinciding with the recent revival of athletic in GAA which had lapsed over the years). Erin go Bragh competed in the Dublin County Board Novice race in 1919, 1921 and 1922 and the Dublin Cross Country championship of 1922.

In 1920, the team again fielded a junior football team but failed to complete the season after conceding three games. T. C. Murphy of Clonsilla, son of Thomas Murphy who was captain of the Erin go Bragh hurling team at the club's foundation, was elected as the first-ever chairman for the Dublin Junior Board.

Erin go Bragh won the County Dublin Novice Cross Country race in 1921 and also held an invitational five-mile race, starting at the court house in Blanchardstown. The club fielded a Junior and schools football team and for the first time since 1890 a hurling team. The club was absent from the field of play in both hurling and football in 1922 but did compete at cross country before sadly disbanding once again in late 1922 early 1923.

1943–1985

The club name is rarely seen afterwards in papers. Erin go Bragh reappeared in 1943 and they were one of six new teams to be re-organise or founded at the end of 1943 for the forthcoming 1944 season. They played their games on the Porterstown Road. They competed until around the 1950s winning the Junior A league in 1945 and were Junior League runners up, losing by one point to Parish Gaels who went on to win the Intermediate football Championship the following year. The club continued competing until around 1947 disbanding again.

The club was reorganised in the 1950s and played at juvenile level. A single team from the club win a minor league in 1963. They disbanded again shortly after with most of the team joining St. Brigids and others joining a club called Maurice O'Neills who played their games in the Phoenix Park. Erin Go Bragh played their games in the colours of green and red at this time.

=== Re-emergence of Erin go Bragh 1986 ===
The name Erin Go Bragh emerged once again in 1986 in Dromheath. The club was reorganised by a number of people who left St. Brigids GAA club. The club started out at juvenile level with 3 teams at Under 10, Under 12 and at Under 14. A junior football team was also founded and played in the then Junior Division 2. Their first game was against St. Brigids B team and attracted a crowd of around 250 people. They reached the quarter-finals of the junior A football championship in their second year however endured several seasons of relegation as the years progressed. The club moved to Porterstown Park in Clonsilla and expanded at under age level with teams at Under 16 and minor level in 1996. The club was once again on the move in 2003 relocating to Clonee, Littlepace/Castaheaney. In September 2005, Fingal County Council allocated football pitches to the club. Former GAA President Mr. Sean Kelly formally launched Erin Go Bragh GAA Club in Littlepace/Castaheany on 23 November 2005. The Clonee, Littlepace/Castaheaney area was identified as having a large and growing population yet no GAA presence.

At the club's first "dinner dance" in, October 2008, the club gave out "club player of the year awards" in Gaelic football (Men's and Ladies') and hurling. A "club person of the year" and "life time achievement" honours were also awarded. The club also unveiled its new crest.

Erin go Bragh celebrated 125 years of the GAA on 10 May 2009, holding a club day (Lá na gClub) in Hazelbury Park. Members of the club and people from the locality were invited to participate in juvenile and adult games of football and hurling. Also in 2009, the club announced that approval in principle had been secured for the placing of temporary juvenile dressing room facilities on a site adjacent to Mary Mother of Hope, National School, Littlepace. The club launched a monthly newsletter in September 2009.

In January 2010, the club installed temporary changing facilities in the grounds of the Mary Mother of Hope Primary school. The dressing room were officially on 9 May 2010. Also in 2010, former Erin go Bragh Footballer Michael O'Riordan was named as manager of the Kildare hurling team. However, his term was a short one. A separate executive committee was set up to look after the development, growth and administration of ladies Gaelic football and camogie.

In 2011, Erin go Bragh featured in the 2011 Dublin GAA Yearbook, being one of thirty clubs to feature in the book. The club also changed their jersey design staying with the same colours of green and white. The club was allocated a new pitch in Beech Park located beside Clonsilla train station. The Junior football team gained promotion from Division 8 to Division 7 and reached the Junior D Football Championship final. The ladies section were awarded small club of the year by the Dublin Ladies Gaelic Football board at their annual dinner dance in November 2011.

The club's adult representation in Gaelic Football increased to two football teams during 2012. The club played their games for the 2012 season in Hazelbury Park, Hunters Run and St. Catherines Park. Erin Go Bragh also appeared in an article in the Evening Herald in 2012. At the time, Erin Go Bragh were one of three clubs (along with St. Brigids and Tyrellstown in Dublin 15) doing a weekly radio show together on Monday nights on local radio station 92.5 Phoenix FM called 'The Throw In'. In 2012, the club's A football team reached the quarter-finals of the Junior D Football Championship losing to Ballyboughal 1–10 to 0–8. For the first time in the club's history, the hurling team reached the final of the Junior E Hurling Championship. They played St. Marks in the final in O'Toole Park, losing 3–13 to 4–4 on 14 October.

During 2013, the club had several successes at juvenile level and their Under 14 camogie team won the Division 5 feile and Under 14 boys football team winning feile Division 8. The ladies minor football team won the Division 4 Shield beating local rivals Castleknock in the final. At adult level, the hurling team won Division 9 and reaching the quarter-finals of the junior D hurling championship. However, the adult football section of the club experienced a difficult year going from fielding two teams to one and were relegated from Division 7.

In 2014, the club fielded its first adult camogie team. For the second year in a row, the hurling team won their league. They went the league season unbeaten winning 12 games and drawing one.

The club joined with Westmanstown Gaels at under 15 football to form St. Catherines during the 2015 season. This was expanded in 2016 with St. Catherine fielding football teams at under 15, 16 and minor and also an under 16 hurling team. The junior football team reached the junior E football championship semi final.

== Club crest ==
Erin go Bragh's first crest, 1986–2008

Erin go Bragh's new crest, 2008

It was decided, in 2008, that the club needed a new crest. To this end, they held a competition for the children in the local primary school where they had to design a crest for their local GAA club. The competition was won by a nine-year-old.

== Grades ==
=== Football ===
The men's football team dates back to the club's foundation. They were junior league runners up in 1906, 1945. They won a minor league in 1963. They finished in 10th position in AFL 8 in 2008 and reached the second round of the Junior C Football Championship.

In 2009, they once again reached the second round of the Junior C Championship exiting after a one-point defeat to St. Marks in a replay having defeated Round Towers, Clondalkin in round one. They finished 13th in AFL 8 in 2009 and 2010. The football team were defeated by Naomh Fionnbarra in the second round of the Junior Football C Championship having received a bye if the first round in 2010. The team finished in 10th position in AFL 8, winning 5, drawing 1, and losing 8 games in the 2010 season.

They reached the 2010 semi-finals of the Murphy Cup losing to Ballinteer St. Johns in a replay. They gained promotion to Division 7 from Division 8 finishing second in the league. In the Junior D Football Championship Erin go Bragh reached the final defeating Round Towers of Lusk in the first round, Innisfalis in the second round, Castleknock in round three, St. Pats of Donabate in the quarter-finals and Wild Geese in the semi-final. The final held in O'Toole Park in Crumlin was against St. Annes who defeated them 3–12 to 0–7.

In 2012, the first team reached the semi-final of the Parsons Cup losing to Robert Emmets in a replay once again. The first game had ended in a draw after extra time. They reached the quarter-finals of the Junior D Football Championship, losing to Ballyboughal in Ballyboughal. They had beaten St. Margarets, St. Finians of Newcastle and Whitehall Colmcille before being knocked out. The club fielded a second football team for the 2012 season. Their first game was against Clann Mhuire in Naul in Division 10 North County of the league, losing 2–5 to 2–15. They won their first ever game on 31 June beating Man O'War in Man O'War 2–12 to 1–10. The second team competed in a tournament hosted by St. Peregrines and co-organised by Tyrrellstown with Croi Ro Naofa also competing on 18 August. Croi Ro Naofa won the cup and St. Peregrines the shield, defeating Erin Go Bragh in the final.

The club started the 2013 season with 2 adult football teams and ended the season with one. The sole remaining football team were relegated from division 7 and knocked out of the junior D football championship in the first round by Wild Geese.

The competed in Division 10 North County and the junior E football championship during 2014. They failed to progress out of their group in the championship and finished in the bottom half of the league.

With the county board reorganizing the leagues, Erin Go Bragh's football team competed in AFL Division 11 North County in 2015. They reached the Junior E football championship semi final, losing to Rosmini Gaels.

In 2016, the club's football team narrowly missed out on a promotion play off place and reached the Junior E football championship semi final losing out to eventual winners Starlights.

The team started the 2017 season strongly and were top of the table at the end of June and had also reached the championship semi finals. However a losing streak of four games saw the side once again exit the championship at the semi-final stage and slip to fourth in the league ending any hopes of promotion.

=== Hurling ===
The club was listed as having a hurling team in 1887 and again in 1921, however there is little or no information on hurling's history in Erin go Bragh. In early September 2005, Erin Go Bragh introduced hurling and camogie to the Littlepace/Castaheaney area. A junior hurling team was set up during the summer of 2007 with a view to competing in the 2008 hurling season. The hurling team played their home games at Saint Catherines due to the club's current pitch in Castaheany/Littlepace close proximity to houses in the area. The hurling team's first match was a friendly against St Peregrines on 30 September 2007. Their first competitive match was against Civil Service Hurling Club in Islandbridge. They finished in 11th position in AHL 8 in 2008 and reached the quarter-finals of the Junior E hurling championship losing to eventual runners up St. Josephs OCB in their first season.

The Erin go Bragh squad for its first competitive hurling game against Civil Service

In the 2009 season, the side played Wild Geese in the first ever Gus Warren Challenge Cup. They were defeated in Oldtown 2–5 to 2–9. The team narrowly missed out on a place in the quarter-finals of the Junior E Championship. The hurling team finished in 10th position in AHL 8 and 4th in the Eddie Barron Shield which was run on a league format with the top two playing off in a final in 2009.

The hurling team reached the Junior E hurling championship quarter finals again in 2010. The team finished in third position in their group behind Kilmacud Crokes and Skerries Harps. They defeated Clontarf, Raheny and Na Fianna, losing to Kilmacud Crokes and Skerries Harps. They played Setanta Hurling Club of Ballymun in the quarter-finals losing by a point in injury time. Setanta went on to the final losing to Saint Patricks of Palmerstown.

During the 2011 season, the hurling team was relegated to Division 9 but remained at Junior E level for championship. They reached the quarter-finals finishing fourth in their group behind Skerries Harps, Kilmacud Crokes and Castleknock beating Commercials and Na Fianna. They were beaten by Realt Dearg who were later defeated by Kilmacud Crokes in the semi-final. The team took part in the Sean Walsh Hurling Tournament on 22 October in Carrick-on-Shannon in County Leitrim. They reached the semi-final playing Clonguish GAA of Longford, Ballinamore Seán O'Heslin's of Leitrim in the group stages and St. Vincents of Dublin in the semi-final. Both Clonguish and St. Vincents who beat Erin Go Bragh reached the final with Clonguish winning the tournament.

In 2012, for the first time in the club's hurling history, the club progressed to the final of the Junior E Hurling Championship. They beat Setanta, Good Counsel, Naomh Mearnog and St. Monicas and losing to Commercials in the group stages. In the quarter-final they played Civil Service, their first competitive game rivals, winning 1–13 to 1–8 on 16 August in Hazelbury Park. They played fellow Dublin 15 club Castleknock in the 2012 semi-final, winning in Somerton 3–11 to 0–8. On 14 October 2012 in O'Toole Park they played St. Marks in their first ever hurling final, losing 3–13 to 4–4. Eight members of the first team who started out in 2007 were part of the squad.

2013 was to be one of the hurling section's most successful seasons. They once again competed in Division 9 of the league losing only a single game and winning the league. But it wasn't until the last day that they won the league with both Lucan Sarsfields and St. Pats of Palmerstown also in the running. They defeated Castleknock in Somerton on 6 October 2013 on a scoreline of 6–17 to 0–8. In the championship, the team was promoted to the D championship after reaching the Junior E championship final in 2012. They reached the quarter-finals beating Whitehall Colmcille, Faughs and Clanna Gael/Fontenoy, losing to Naomh Fionnbarra and Skerries Harps in the group stage. They lost to eventual runners ups Castleknocks second team in the quarter-finals.

During the 2014 season, the club competed in division 8 of the hurling league and the junior D hurling championship. While they failed to progress from the group stages of the championship they went the league unbeaten to win it winning 12 and drawing one.

In 2015, the side maintained their status in Division 7 but were relegated to the Junior E hurling championship.

2016 proved to be the club's hurling team's toughest since their foundation. A manager for the team could not be found, and while caretaker management was in place, the team won just a single game in Division 7 and as a result were relegated to Division 8 for 2017. The team did, however, manage to maintain their Junior E hurling championship status.

The club failed to find a coach for the 2017 season and, again with caretaker coaches in place, the hurling team once again struggled in 2017 with only a draw to their name in the championship they were relegated to junior F status for 2018 after losing to St Brigids in a relegation play off. In the league narrowly avoided relegation.

In 2018, the hurling side retained their status in AHL 8 and won the Junior F hurling championship, the first club championship ever for the club beating Fingallians in the final on 18 November in Collinstown Lane 1–14 to 1–6.

=== Ladies football and camogie ===
In 2005, a ladies adult Gaelic football team was set up shortly after the club's relocation to the Littlepace area. The ladies football team finished seventh in Division 7 and picked up their first ever competitive wins in both league and championship in 2008.

The first underage football and camogie teams were fielded at Under 12 in 2008. The underage section of Erin go Bragh had a number of successes in 2008. Erin Go Bragh U12's Camogie team reached the County Championship Final following a last minute score against Cuala. They were, however, beaten by Good Counsel in the final. The Under 12 camogie team were also runners up in Division 2 group 2 league. Four members of the Under 12 camogie team were selected for the Under 12's Dublin Camogie development squad becoming the first players to be selected for any intercounty team at the club. In ladies Gaelic football, the Under 12 girls team were Division 3 shield runners up to St. Peregrines.

In 2009, the Under 13 girls football team won the Division Three Championship shield.

A separate executive committee was set up in 2010 in order to ensure the development and growth of ladies Gaelic games as both the ladies football and camogie are both administered by separate county boards to the men's games in Dublin. The Under 14 team were runners up in Division 3 of the 2010 camogie league defeating Cuala in a play off. The Under 14s went on to win the Division 4 Championship defeating Ballyboughal in the semi-final in Hunters Run, and Thomas Davis in the final on Ballinteer Saint Johns all-weather pitch on 31 October 2010.

Following on their success in 2010, the ladies section expanded in the number of teams taking to the field for the 2011 season. Along with the now Under 15 girls camogie and football team, they also fielded teams at U13 football and camogie and at Under 10. The ladies section also took part in the Gaelic for girls initiative. The Under 15s won their league in 2011. Two girls were also selected on the Under 14 Dublin Ladies Camogie development squad with Kevin Kenny also on the coaching team. The ladies section were awarded small club of the year award by the Dublin ladies Gaelic Football board at their annual awards night in November 2011.

In 2012 the ladies section fielded teams in Under 10,11, 14 and 16 football and Under 11, 14 and 16 Camogie. The Under 14 Camogie team won the Dublin Division 5 Camogie Feile on 27 May defeating Commercials in the Final 0–1 to 0–0 in Parnell Park. The Under 14 Football team reached the Division 5 Championship final. They beat Foxrock–Cabinteely on 22 October in Craobh Chiarans ground Clonshaugh. The Under 16 Football team are in the semi-final. The U16 camogie team had to play of against Lucan Sarfields for a spot in the semi-final of the C championship. Both teams were level on points after the group stages and Lucan won the playoff. The Under 16s lost to Ballyboden/St. Endas by one point in the C Shield final.

In 2013 the ladies section started an Under 9 team and a girls nursery for 4–7 year olds was also set up. For the second year in a row the Under 14 camogie team won the Division 5 camogie feile beating Setanta in the final. Jessica Carroll and Niamh Padden were selected for the Under 14 Dublin camogie development panel while Alannah Kenny and Saoirse Donohue were selected for the Under 15 Dublin development panel. The Under 15 ladies football team were runners up in the division 4 championship while the camogie team lost to Ballyboden/St. Endas in the Division 4 championship shield final. The ladies minor football team won the Division 4 championship shield beating Castleknock in the final. The minor camogie team reached the final of the Minor Development Shield losing out narrowly to St. Oliver Plunketts/Eoghan Ruadh.

The ladies section fielded adult teams in adult football and camogie in 2014. It will be the first time since 2008 that the club has fielded an adult ladies football team and the first time in the club's history that they will field an adult camogie team. The under 13 ladies football team won the division 4 cup while the under 16 ladies football team won the division 4 shield. The under 13 camogie team were division 5 runners up. The under 16 camogie team won the C championship shield while the under 13 camogie team won the D championship shield. Alannah Kenny and Sorcha Donohue were part of the Dublin under 16B Leinster winning camogie team.

=== Underage/juvenile ===
The club is involved in coaching children ranging from 4 to 16 years of age in football, hurling and camogie. A Juvenile Committee was set up to oversee the development of the club's younger players. Erin Go Bragh, with financial support from the Dublin County Board, also provide coaching through a Gaelic Games Promotions Officer (and an additional coach through a Community Employment Scheme) during school hours at three primary schools; the Mary Mother of Hope National School, Scoil Benedict, Scoil Grainne and one secondary school Colaiste Pobail Setanta.

In 2015, Erin Go Bragh joined with Westmanstowns Gaels to form a team at under 15 called Saint Catherines. The amalgamation was expanded in 2018 to see teams field at U14, U15, U16 and minor for football and at U14, U15 and U16 for hurling.

== Roll of honour ==
- Dublin Junior Football League Runners Up 1906
- Dublin Junior 'A' Football League Winners 1945
- Dublin Minor Football League Winners 1963
- Dublin Minor Division 5 Football League Winners 2005
- Dublin Minor Division 4 Football League Winners 2006
- Dublin AFL Div. 8 Runners Up 2011
- Dublin Junior D Football Championship Runners Up 2011
- Dublin Junior E Hurling Championship Runners Up 2012
- Dublin Hurling AHL Division 9 Winners 2013
- Dublin Hurling AHL Division 8 Winners 2014
- Dublin Junior F Hurling Championship Winners 2018
- Dublin AFL Div. 11 North Runners Up 2018
- Mooney Cup (Football) Winners 2018
