= Dublin Senior 2 Hurling Championship =

Gaelic Athletic Association competition

- Irish: Craobh Sinsear Iomána 2 Baile Átha Cliath
- Founded: 1999
- Region: Dublin (GAA)
- No. of teams: 12
- Title holders: St. Oliver Plunkett's/ER (2026) (3rd title)
- First winner: St. Oliver Plunkett's/ER
- Most titles: Faughs (4 titles)
- Sponsors: PTSB

The Dublin Senior 2 Hurling Championship (Dublin SHC2) (Irish: Craobh Sinsear Iomána 2 Baile Átha Cliath) (branded as the PTSB Dublin Senior 2 Hurling Championship) is an annual Gaelic Athletic Association competition involving the second tier hurling clubs in Dublin. The winners and the runner-up of the Dublin 2 Hurling Championship go on to qualify for the Dublin Senior Hurling Championship.

== Format ==
The championship consists of 12 teams placed into two groups of 6 (A & B).

=== Group stage ===
The championship consists of 12 teams. Each team plays the teams in their group once (5 matches in total). Matches are played at the participating clubs grounds, resulting in either 2 or 3 home games for each club. Two points are awarded for a win, one for a draw and zero for a loss. The teams are ranked in the group stage table by points gained, then scoring difference and then their head-to-head record.

=== Knockout stage ===
The top four teams in each group qualify for the quarter semi-finals, the bottom two teams in each group enter the relegation semi-finals. There must be a winner on the day for each knockout fixture, extra-time and penalties will be used if necessary.

Relegation Semi-finals:

The bottom four teams enter this stage. The higher ranked team receives home advantage.

- 5A v 6B
- 5B v 6A

The two losers are relegated to the Dublin Premier Intermediate Hurling Championship.

Quarter-finals:

The top 8 teams enter this stage. The higher ranked team receives home advantage.

- 1A v 4B
- 1B v 4A
- 2A v 3B
- 2B v 3A

The four winners advance to the semi-finals.

Semi-finals:

The winners of the quarter-finals will be drawn against each other. The higher placed team from the group stage receives home advantage.

Final: The two semi-final winners contest the final in a neutral ground. There must be a winner on the day (extra-time and penalties if necessary). Both teams are promoted to the Dublin Senior Hurling Championship. The winning team are declared champions.

== Roll of Honour ==
=== By club ===
#	Team	Titles	Championships won
1	Faughs	4	2001, 2005, 2018, 2025
2	St. Oliver Plunketts/ER	3	1999, 2015, 2026
2	Naomh Fionbarra	3	2011, 2016, 2020
4	Kilmacud Crokes	2	2002, 2014
5	Whitehall Colmcille	1	2022
5	St. Brigid’s	1	2009
5	Scoil Ui Chonaill	1	2019
5	St. Jude’s	1	2007
5	Commercials	1	2004
5	Ballyboden St Enda's	1	2012
5	St. Mark’s	1	2006
5	Erin's Isle	1	2000
5	St Pat's, Palmerstown	1	2008
5	Ballinteer St. John's	1	2010
5	Parnells	1	2013
5	Raheny	1	2017
5	Castleknock	1	2021
5	Craobh Chiaráin	1	2023
5	Naomh Barróg	1	2024

== List of Finals ==
Year	Winner	Score	Opponent	Score
2026	St Oliver Plunkett's ER	1-15	Craobh Chiaráin	0-06
2025	Faughs	1-17 (2 pens)	Ballyboden St Enda's	1-17 (1 pen)
2024	Naomh Barróg	0-20	St Oliver Plunkett's ER	0–12
2023	Craobh Chiaráin	0-19	St Jude's	0-15
2022	Whitehall Colmcille		Faughs	
2021	Castleknock		Kilmacud Crokes	
2020	Naomh Fionbarra	2–14	Cuala	0–17
2019	Scoil Ui Chonaill	1–11	Thomas Davis	0–11
2018	Faughs	2–17	St Oliver Plunkett's ER	2-08
2017	Raheny	0–21	Whitehall Colmcille	0–20
2016	Naomh Fionbarra	1–16	Naomh Barróg	2–10
2015	St Oliver Plunkett's ER	1–18	Ballyboden St Enda's	0–19
2014	Kilmacud Crokes	1–16	Setanta	0–14
2013	Parnells	1–16	Ballyboden St Enda's	2–10
2012	Ballyboden St Enda's			
2011	Naomh Fionbarra	1–19	St Patrick's, Palmerstown	3–12
2010	Ballinteer St John's	1–11	Na Fianna	0–13
2009	St Brigid's	3–14	St Vincent's	1-08
2008	St Patrick's, Palmerstown		Faughs	
2007	St Jude's		Na Fianna	
2006	St Mark's		Crumlin	
2005	Faughs		St Brigid's	
2004	Commercials		Lucan Sarsfields	
2003				
2002	Kilmacud Crokes		Erin's Isle	
2001	Faughs		Naomh Fionbarra	
2000	Erin's Isle		St Oliver Plunkett's ER	
1999	St Oliver Plunkett's ER		Kevin's	
