= Réalt Dearg GAA =

Gaelic games club in County Dublin, Ireland

Realt Dearg
- Founded: 2009
- County: Dublin
- Nickname: the stars
- Colours: Red and Black
- Grounds: Drimnagh Castle, Bushy Park,

Playing kits
Standard colours

Réalt Dearg is one of Dublins six hurling only clubs (the others are Faughs, Kevins, Commercials, Civil Service Hurling Club and Setanta of Ballymun). The club is also the county's youngest, established in November 2009. The teams catchment area is the South Dublin City suburbs of Rathmines, Ranelagh, Rathgar, Terenure, Donnybrook and Clonskeagh. They currently train in Drimnagh Castle and Stepaside and play their games in Drimnagh Castle. Players can often be found in Vaughans and Bushy Park too.

== Club formation ==
Kilkenny native Liam Lanigan and Conor Droma Cavan, noticed that hurling was poorly catered for in the Ranelagh/Terenure/Rathmines area of the city and decided with some help to try and set up a team. They had hoped to set up a team with Ranelagh Gaels. However, there was not much support from the club. After investigating the prospects of setting up a new club using internet forums the two decided to establish their own club to cater for hurling only. Nine people attended their first meeting in November 2009 and by their maiden game they had nineteen members. They were originally decided on Cú Chulainn as the name of the new club but on hearing that there was a Minor Football team in Fingal by the same name called themselves Réalt Dearg. Their first game was against Commercials of Rathcoole.

== 2010 and Beyond ==
In their first year the club reached the Junior F Hurling Championship semi final losing out to eventual winners Castleknock. By the time the 2011 season had come around the club's numbers had risen to fifty three. This was due mostly to the club's use of the internet and internet forums and the club's visibility in their catchment area with a poster campaign. The club a has also featured on the Gaelic Athletic Association (GAA) website and the Evening Herald. While the club has witnessed no problem in recruiting players in it early days getting a coach has proved difficult. The club entered two teams for the 2011 season in Division 8 and 9 and Junior E and F championship. The rise of Réalt Dearg reflects the change in fortunes of Dublin hurling at both county and inter county level. Since 2008 along with Réalt Dearg other clubs such as Erin go Bragh, St. Pats of Donabate, Wild Geese, Na Gaeil Óga CLG have started hurling and the expansion of the Dublin hurling leagues from eight to nine Divisions and an additional Junior hurling championship reflects the interest in the game in Dublin. The club also participated in the Leinster Hurling League. The A team reached the semi-finals of the Junior E Hurling Championship losing to Kilmacud Crokes. They were runners up in Division 8 of the league losing in the league final to Clanna Gael/Fontenoy after a replay. The B team reached the quarter-final of the Junior F Hurling Championship losing to St. Marks who went on to reach the final. The Club has progressed steadily since then thanks to the work and determination of the players and the various committee's over the years . As of 2019 the Club fields 3 teams operating in the Junior A, Junior E Championships and competing in the AHL 5, AHL 8 and AHL 9 Leagues. The Club has competed in a number of Junior County Finals which has allowed for the progression from humble beginnings of Junior F Championship to currently competing for promotion to the Intermediate Championship. The ethos of the club is to accept every one no matter what skill level and make them part of the hurling community both in the club and in the wider Dublin Hurling Community. The Goal of the Club is to be competitive at senior club hurling with a thriving juvenile section which is currently being actively progressed by the club committee.

== Honours ==
- Dublin Junior Hurling AHL Division 7 Winners 2014.
