= Dublin Minor Hurling Championship =

- Irish: ?
- Founded: 1929
- Title holders: Lucan Sarsfields (1st title)
- Most titles: St Vincents (20 titles)
- Sponsors: ?

The Dublin Minor Club Hurling Championship is a Gaelic Athletic Association competition between the top teams in minor club hurling in County Dublin. Clontarf GAA are the current title holders. The Dublin Minor Club Hurling Championship is regarded as the pinnacle of the

== Roll of Honour ==
Year	Winner	Score	Opponent	Score
2026	Kilmacud Crokes	0-15	Ballyboden St Enda's	1-10
2025	Lucan Sarsfields	4-13	St Jude's	2-13
2023	Lucan Sarsfields	1-19	Kilmacud Crokes	1-18
2022	Lucan Sarsfields		Kilmacud Crokes	
2021	Raheny	2-11	St Vincent's	0-13
2020	Kilmacud Crokes	4-19	St Oliver Plunketts/Eoghan Ruadh	1-15
2019	Kilmacud Crokes	0-15	Ballyboden St Enda's	0-14
2018	Kilmacud Crokes	2-21	Ballyboden St Enda's	2-16
2017	Na Fianna	5-15	Lucan Sarsfields	3-09
2016	Na Fianna	1-20	St Vincent's	1-15
2015	Na Fianna	2-14	St Brigid's	1-12
2014	Na Fianna	1-26	Kilmacud Crokes	0-14
2013	Ballyboden St Enda's	3-09	Kilmacud Crokes	0-17
2012	Na Fianna	3-07	Ballyboden St Enda's	0-15
2011	Kilmacud Crokes	4-05	Ballyboden St Enda's	2-06
2010	Kilmacud Crokes	3-12	Ballyboden St Enda's	1-09
2009	Kilmacud Crokes	2-11	St Vincent's	2-06
2008	Ballyboden St Enda's	0-11	Cuala	0-10
2007	Kilmacud Crokes	1-11	Na Fianna	0-05
2006	Ballyboden St Enda's	4-13	Na Fianna	1-08
2005	Lucan Sarsfields		Ballyboden St Enda's	
2004	Round Towers Clondalkin	4-05	Ballyboden St Enda's	2-10
2003	St Brigid's			
2002	St Vincent's	3-11	St Jude's	3-07
2001	Ballyboden St Enda's			
2000	Ballyboden St Enda's			
1999	Ballyboden St Enda's			
1998	Kilmacud Crokes		Erin's Isle	
1997	Ballyboden St Enda's			
1996	Ballyboden St Enda's		Erin's Isle	
1995	Ballyboden St Enda's			
1994	Ballyboden St Enda's			
1993	O'Toole's	4-11	St Brigid's	2-02
1992	St Vincent's			
1991	St Vincent's			
1990	St Vincent's			
1989	Craobh Chiaráin			
1988	St Vincent's			
1987	St Oliver Plunketts			
1986	St Oliver Plunketts			
1985	Kilmacud Crokes	3-10	Trinity Gaels	1-06
1984	St Oliver Plunketts			
1983	Erin's Isle			
1982	St Vincent's			
1981	Na Fianna	1-10	O'Toole's	0-08
1980	St Oliver Plunketts		Erin's Isle	
1979	St Vincent's			
1978	St Vincent's		Kevin's	
1977	St Oliver Plunketts			
1976	Crumlin			
1975	O'Toole's		Eoghan Ruadh	
1974	Eoghan Ruadh			
1973	Eoghan Ruadh			
1972	Eoghan Ruadh			
1971	St Vincent's			
1970	Cuala Casements			
1969	Cuala Casements			
1968	St Columba's			
1967	Colmcille			
1966	St Vincent's			
1965	St Columba's			
1964	Na Fianna			
1963	Ballyfermot BLS			
1962	St Vincent's			
1961	St Vincent's			
1960	Dalcassians			
1959	Rialto Gaels			
1958	Scoil Ui Chonaill			
1957	St Vincent's			
1956	Kevin's			
1955	St Vincent's			
1954	St Columba's			
1953	O'Tooles			
1952	St Columba's			
1951	St Vincent's			
1950	St Vincent's			
1949	St Vincent's			
1948	St Vincent's			
1947	St Vincent's			
1946	St Vincent's			
1945	St Vincent's			
1944	St Vincent's			
1943	St Vincent's			
1942	Eoghan Ruadh			
1941	Eoghan Ruadh			
1940	Eoghan Ruadh			
1939	Eoghan Ruadh			
1938	Eoghan Ruadh			
1937	Eoghan Ruadh			
1936	St Vincent's			
1935	Crokes			
1934	Crokes			
1933	Crokes			
1932	Crokes			
1931	Crokes			
1930	Crokes			
1929	Crokes			

== Minor B Championship ==
=== Roll of Honour ===
Year	Winner	Score	Opponent	Score
2025	Trinity Gaels	1-17	Fingallians	1-13
2024	Fingallians	4-14	Kevin's	3-15
2023	Fingallians	3-14	Thomas Davis	2-13
2022	Naomh Barróg	5-17	St Vincent's	1-11
2021	Ballinteer St John's	2-16	Castleknock	1-18
2020	Ballinteer St John's		St Brigid's	
2019	St Oliver Plunketts/Eoghan Ruadh	3-24	St Brigid's	2-06
2018	Ballinteer St John's	2-12	Raheny	2-07
2017	St Oliver Plunketts/Eoghan Ruadh		Thomas Davis	
2016	Faughs	2-13	Ballinteer St John's	1-12
2015	Cuala	0-16	Ballinteer St John's	0-11
2014	St Brigid's			
2013	St Oliver Plunkett's/Eoghan Ruadh	3-09	Lucan Sarsfields	2-09
2012	Faughs		Castleknock	
2011	St Brigid's	1-15	St Vincents	1-10
2010			Kevin's	
2009	Castleknock	1-08	Kevin's	0-08
2008	Ballyboden St Enda's		St Vincent's	
2007	Lucan Sarsfields	4-05 (17)	St Oliver Plunkett's/Eoghan Ruadh	1-09 (12)
2006	Naomh Barróg	2-07	Whitehall Colmcille	2-05
2005				
2004				
2003				
2002	Round Towers			
2001	Lucan Sarsfields			
2000	Naomh Fionnbarra			

== Minor C Championship ==
=== Roll of Honour ===
Year	Winner	Score	Opponent	Score
2026	Lucan Sarsfields	1-10	Castleknock	0-10
2025	Thomas Davis	4-16	Ballyboden St Enda's	0-15
2024	Scoil Ui Chonaill	1-12	St Jude's	2-08
2023	Commercials	6-19	Ballyboden St Enda's	2-04
2022				
2021	Erin's Isle	2-18	Ballyboden St Enda's	2-14
2020				
2019	Naomh Ólaf	4-18	Clanna Gael Fontenoy	3-10
2018	Cu Chuallain	1-20	Faughs	1-13
2017	Castleknock		Na Fianna	
2016	Erin's Isle		Isles of the Sea	
2015	Ballyboden St Enda's B	3-06	St Sylvester's	1-11
2014	Erin's Isle	1-10	Naomh Barróg	0-09
2013	Na Fianna B	2-10	Skerries Harps	0-08
2012	Thomas Davis	4-16	St Peregrine's	1-04
2011	St Sylvester's	3-09	Raheny	1-11
2010	St Brigid's			
2009	St Vincents B		St Mark's	
2008	Faughs		Naomh Barróg	
2007	St Jude's	1-10	St Patrick's, Palmerstown	0-10
2006	Kilmacud Crokes B	2-08	Cuala	0-06
2005	Naomh Barróg			
2004	Faughs			
2003	Ballyboden St Enda's B			

== Minor D Championship ==
Dublin Minor D Hurling Championship
- Irish: ?
- Founded: 2007
- Title holders: Raheny (1st title)
- First winner: Cuala
- Most titles: St Vincents B (2 titles)

=== Top winners ===
#	Team	Wins	Years won	Last final lost
1	Na Fianna	2	2010, 2014	
1	Ballyboden St Enda's	2	2013, 2016	2017
1	Cuala	2	2007, 2020	2012, 2015

=== Roll of Honour ===
Year	Winner	Score	Opponent	Score
2026	Crumlin	2-14	St Patrick's, Palmerstown/Good Counsel	1-15
2025	Raheny	1-12	Castleknock	1-07
2024	Kilmacud Crokes	2-12	Ranelagh Gaels	0-12
2023	St Sylvester's	2-12	Lucan Sarsfields	2-11
2022				
2021	Clanna Gael Fontenoy	1-12	Kevin's	2-07
2020	Cuala	4-12	Faughs	2-14
2019	Naomh Fionnbarra	4-14	Castleknock	0-05
2018	Commercials	2-07	Lucan Sarsfields	1-09
2017	St Peregrines	2-24	Ballyboden St Enda's	3-06
2016	Ballyboden St Enda's	3-08	St Sylvester's	1-11
2015	St Vincents B	1-10	Cuala	0-10
2014	Na Fianna	2-12	Lucan Sarsfields	2-10
2013	Ballyboden St Enda's	1-12	Fingallians	2-07
2012	Castleknock	0-08	Cuala	0-07
2011	Skerries Harps	1-13	Alfie Byrne Gaels	1-05
2010	Thomas Davis	4-08	Parnells	3-05
2009	St Vincents B	2-11	St Mark's A	1-11
2008	Whitehall Colmcille	3-07	St Sylvester's	0-10
2007	Cuala	1-10	Naomh Mearnóg	3-02

== Minor E Championship ==
=== Roll of Honour ===
Year	Winner	Score	Opponent	Score
2026	Na Gaeil Óga	5-11	Scoli Ui Conaill	1-11
2025	Round Towers Clondalkin	5-06	Raheny	1-05
2024				
2023				
2022				
2021	Ballinteer St John's	0-11	Castleknock	0-04
2020				
2019				
2011	Setanta	4-19	Castleknock	1-04
2010				
2009				
2008	Ballyboden St Enda's			
2007	Na Fianna	4-14	Clontarf	1-03
