= Dublin Minor Football Championship =

Annual football competition

- Irish: Craobh Mionúir; Bhaile Átha Cliath
- Founded: 1930
- Title holders: Na Fianna (9th title)
- Most titles: St Vincent's (24 titles)
- Sponsors: ?

The Dublin Minor Football Championship "A" is a Gaelic Athletic Association competition organised by Dublin GAA between the top teams in minor (under-18) Gaelic football in County Dublin, Ireland. The trophy awarded for the championship is the FitzGerald Cup.

== A Championship ==
=== Top winners ===
#	Team	Wins	Years won	Last final lost
1	St Vincents	24	1936, 1942, 1943, 1945, 1946, 1947, 1948, 1950, 1955, 1956, 1958, 1959, 1970, 1971, 1978, 1979, 1980, 1981, 1982, 1983, 1986, 1987, 1994	2009
2	Na Fianna	9	1960, 1965, 1974, 1975, 2008, 2009, 2014, 2017, 2025	2016
3	Ballyboden St Enda's	8	1990, 1993, 1996, 1998, 2002, 2010, 2020, 2023,	2018
4	Kilmacud Crokes	6	1999, 2003, 2005, 2012, 2021, 2026	2014
5	Scoil Ui Chonaill	5	1962, 1963, 1964, 1968, 1969	
5	O'Toole's	5	1931, 1933, 1934, 1954, 1957	
5	Ballymun Kickhams	5	1977, 2015 (1953, 1952, 1951 as Kickhams)	2005
6	Kevin's	4	1932, 1937, 1938, 1940	
7	St. Sylvester's, Malahide	3	1992, 2000, 2001	2025
7	Castleknock	2	2011, 2019	
7	Whitehall Colmcille	2	1984, 2018	
7	Raheny	2	1972, 1973	
7	Peadar Mackens	2	1935, 1944	
7	Synge Street PP	2	1949, 1961	
7	St Brigid's	2	1995, 2007	
7	Cuala	2	2006, 2013	
9	G.S.R.	1	1941	
9	Good Counsel	1	1966	
9	Bulfins	1	1939	
9	Air Corps	1	1967	
9	Crumlin	1	1976	
9	Round Towers	1	2004	1997
9	Naomh Mearnóg	1	1997	
9	Thomas Davis	1	1991	
9	Skerries Harps	1	1989	
9	Fingallians	1	1988	
9	Erin's Isle	1	1985	
9	Desmonds	1	1930	
9	Clontarf	1	2016	2024
9	St. Jude's	1	2024	

=== Roll of Honour ===
Year	Winner	Score	Opponent	Score
2026	Kilmacud Crokes	2-09	Ballyboden St. Enda's	1-10
2025	Na Fianna	1-11	St. Sylvester's	1-06
2024	St. Jude's	4-05	St. Patrick's, Donabate	0-08
2023	Ballyboden St. Enda's	6-08	Kilmacud Crokes	3-07
2022				
2021	Kilmacud Crokes	2-13	St Vincents	1-09
2020	Ballyboden St. Enda's	4-12	Ballinteer St John's	2-11
2019	Castleknock	2-16	Thomas Davis	0-16
2018	Whitehall Colmcille	2-07	Ballyboden St. Enda's	0-12
2017	Na Fianna	1-08	Thomas Davis	1-07
2016	Clontarf	2-05	Na Fianna	0-09
2015	Ballymun Kickhams	5-04	Ballyboden St. Enda's	2-09
2014	Na Fianna	2-09	Kilmacud Crokes	1-06
2013	Cuala	2-14	Kilmacud Crokes	1-09
2012	Kilmacud Crokes	0-10	St. Sylvester's, Malahide	0-08
2011	Castleknock	0-13	Ballyboden St. Enda's	1-05
2010	Ballyboden St. Enda's	0-07	Na Fianna	0-06
2009	Na Fianna	1-11	St Vincent's	0-06
2008	Na Fianna	1-10	St. Brigid's	1-09
2007	St. Brigid's	0-11	Na Fianna	0-06
2006	Cuala	2-11	St. Vincent's	1-03
2005	Kilmacud Crokes		Ballymun Kickhams	
2004	Round Towers, Clondalkin	2-08	Lucan Sarsfields	1-05
2003	Kilmacud Crokes			
2002	Ballyboden St. Enda's		Craobh Chiaráin	
2001	St. Sylvester's, Malahide			
2000	St. Sylvester's, Malahide		Kilmacud Crokes	
1999	Kilmacud Crokes		St. Sylvester's, Malahide	
1998	Ballyboden St. Enda's	2-09	Kilmacud Crokes	1-07
1997	Naomh Mearnóg		Round Towers, Clondalkin	
1996	Ballyboden St. Enda's		St. Vincent's	
1995	St. Brigid's		Ballyboden St. Enda's	
1994	St. Vincent's		St. Brigid's	
1993	Ballyboden St. Enda's		St. Sylvester's, Malahide	
1992	St. Sylvester's, Malahide			
1991	Thomas Davis		Whitehall Colmcille	
1990	Ballyboden St. Enda's		Fingallians	
1989	Skerries Harps	1-07	Erin's Isle	0-04
1988	Fingallians			
1987	St. Vincent's		Thomas Davis	
1986	St. Vincent's		Erin's Isle	
1985	Erin's Isle		St Anne's	
1984	Whitehall Colmcille		Ballyboden St. Enda's	
1983	St. Vincent's			
1982	St. Vincent's			
1981	St. Vincent's			
1980	St. Vincent's		Na Fianna	
1979	St. Vincent's			
1978	St. Vincent's			
1977	Ballymun Kickhams			
1976	Crumlin			
1975	Na Fianna			
1974	Na Fianna			
1973	Raheny			
1972	Raheny			
1971	St. Vincent's			
1970	St. Vincent's	2-12	Kilmacud Crokes	2-05
1969	Scoil Ui Chonaill			
1968	Scoil Ui Chonaill			
1967	Air Corps			
1966	Good Counsel			
1965	Na Fianna			
1964	Scoil Ui Chonaill			
1963	Scoil Ui Chonaill			
1962	Scoil Ui Chonaill			
1961	Synge Street PP			
1960	Na Fianna			
1959	St. Vincent's			
1958	St. Vincent's			
1957	O'Tooles			
1956	St. Vincent's			
1955	St. Vincent's			
1954	O'Tooles			
1953	Kickhams			
1952	Kickhams			
1951	Kickhams			
1950	St. Vincent's			
1949	Synge Street PP			
1948	St. Vincent's			
1947	St. Vincent's			
1946	St. Vincent's			
1945	St. Vincent's			
1944	Peader Mackens			
1943	St. Vincent's			
1942	St. Vincent's			
1941	G.S.R.			
1940	Kevin's			
1939	Bulfins			
1938	Kevin's			
1937	Kevin's			
1936	St. Vincent's			
1935	Peader Mackens			
1934	O'Tooles			
1933	O'Tooles			
1932	Kevin's			
1931	O'Tooles			
1930	Desmonds			

== B Championship ==
Year	Winner	Score	Opponent	Score
2026	Castleknock	1-14	Skerries Harps	0-16
2025	Ballinteer St. John's	1-17	Castleknock	1-07
2024	Skerries Harps	0-12	Ballyboden St. Enda's	2-05
2023				
2022	Fingal Ravens	4-13	Skerries Harps	0-17
2021	Thomas Davis	0-14	Naomh Barróg	0-13
2020				
2019	Cuala		Fingal Ravens	
2018	Castleknock		Lucan Sarsfields	
2017	St Vincent's		St. Mary's, Saggart	
2016	St. Oliver Plunketts/Eoghan Ruadh	3-09	Round Towers, Lusk	0-08
2015	Cuala	3-08	Clontarf	0-13
2014	St. Brigids			
2013	Naomh Fionbarra	6-13	Trinity Gaels	0-07
2012	O'Tooles		Clontarf	
2011	Lucan Sarsfields	2-08	St. Brigid's	0-08
2010				
2009	Lucan Sarsfields		Ballinteer St. John's	
2008	Fingallians		Clontarf	
2007	St Jude's		Fingallians	
2006	St Patrick's, Palmerstown		Ballinteer St. John's	
2005	Lucan Sarsfields		Naomh Ólaf	
2004	Fingal Ravens			
2003	Skerries Harps			
2002				
2001				
2000	Ballyboden St. Enda's			
1999				
1998				
1997	St Brigid's			
1996				
1995			Ballyboden St. Enda's	
1994	Ballyboden St. Enda's			
1993	Kilmacud Crokes		St. Brigid's	
1992	Kilmacud Crokes	1-07	St. Sylvester's	1-05

== C Championship ==
Year	Winner	Score	Opponent	Score
2026	North County Gaels	2-13	Ranelagh Gaels	0-14
2025	Trinity Gaels	2-07	Whitehall Colmcille	1-09
2024	St. Anne's	1-19	Castleknock	2-13
2023				
2022				
2021	Fingal Ravens		St. Patrick's, Donabate	
2020	Cuala	2-07	Kilmacud Crokes	7-13
2019	St. Peter's	2-12	Kilmacud Crokes	3-07
2018	Raheny	1-08	St. Brigid's	1-07
2017	Craobh Chiaráin	2-08	Ballyboden St. Enda's	0-13
2016	St Marys, Saggart	1-10	Erin's Isle	0-11
2015	Skerries Harps		St. Patrick's, Donabate	
2014				
2013	Raheny	2-17	Kilmacud Crokes	3-07
2012				
2011	Fingal Ravens	4-13	Castleknock	0-07
2010				
2009	St. Anne's		Erin's Isle	
2008				
2007	Clontarf	1-09	Clann Mhuire	1-05
2006	Naomh Maur	2-13	Castleknock	1-09

== D Championship ==
Date	Winner	Score	Opponent	Score
2026	Naomh Fionbarra	3-10	Clanna Gael Fontenoy	1-09
2025	St Patrick's, Palmerstown	0-16	St. Sylvester's	0-14
2024	Ballyboden St. Enda's	0-11	Round Towers, Lusk	0-10
2023	Kilmacud Crokes	4-07	St Agnes GAA	2-04
2022				
2021	Clanna Gael Fontenoy	1-14	Parnells	0-11
2019	Trinity Gaels	2-09	Na Fianna	0-08
2018	Commercials	2-07	Lucan Sarsfields	1-09
2017	Thomas Davis	1-10	Castleknock	0-08
2016				
2015				
2014	Kilmacud Crokes	1-07	Castleknock	1-06
2013	Cuala	2-12	St. Vincent's	3-07
2012	Ballyboden St. Enda's	3-10	St. Peter's	0-06
2011	Na Fianna	2-15	St. Mary's, Saggart	0-09
2010				
2009	Na Fianna	0-08	Skerries Harps	1-09
2008				
2007	Lucan Sarsfields	1-09	St. Vincent's	2-12

== E Championship ==
Year	Winner	Score	Opponent	Score
2026	Clontarf	2-17	SSE Gaels	1-10
2025	Geraldine P Morans	2-20	Whitehall Colmcille	2-08
2024	Man O'War	4-06	O'Dwyer's	0-16
2023				
2022				
2021	O'Tooles	2-13	Castleknock	3-07
2019	Kilmacud Crokes	7-15	St Patrick's, Palmerstown	0-07
2018	St. Sylvester's, Malahide	2-07	Raheny	1-07
2011	Ballyboden St. Enda's	1-11	Craobh Chiaráin	0-07

== F Championship ==
Year	Winner	Score	Opponent	Score
2026	Scoli Ui Conaill	1-12	Man O'War	1-05
2025	Ballymun Kickhams	0-12	Naomh Barróg	0-07
2024	Trinity Gaels	4-13	St. Finian's, Newcastle	3-10
2011				

== G Championship ==
Year	Winner	Score	Opponent	Score
2026	St. Sylvester's	10-05	Raheny	2-06
2025	Raheny	6-08	Templeogue Synge Street	1-06
2011	St. Patrick's, Donabate	0-11	Cu Chuaillainn	1-04
