= Dublin Junior Hurling Championship =

Hurling competition in Dublin, Ireland

Dublin Junior Hurling Championship 2021
- Title holders: Ballyboden St Enda's (Junior A); St Patrick's, Palmerstown (Junior B); Lucan Sarsfields (Junior C); Thomas Davis (Junior D); Naomh Barróg (Junior E); St Peregrines (Junior F); St Vincent's (Junior G); Portobello (Junior H)

The Dublin Junior Hurling championship is the Junior Gaelic Athletic Association hurling competition of Dublin. The winners of the Junior championship go on to qualify for the Dublin Intermediate Hurling Championship in the following year. The winner will also represent Dublin GAA in the Special Section of the Leinster Junior Club Hurling Championship.

== Teams ==
=== 2024 teams ===
Team	Location	Division	Colours	In championship since	Championship titles	Last championship title
Crumlin	Crumlin		Royal blue and white			
Faughs	Templeogue		Gold with green sash			
St Oliver Plunketts/Eoghan Ruadh	Navan Road		Maroon and gold			
St Patricks	Chapelizod and Palmerstown					
Ballyboden St Enda's	Knocklyon	South Dublin	Blue and white			
Clanna Gael Fontenoy	Ringsend		Blue, green, gold and white			
Kevin's	Dolphin's Barn		Blue and white			
Lucan Sarsfields	Lucan	South Dublin	White and green			
Skerries Harps	Skerries		Blue and white			
St Brigid's	Castleknock	Fingal	Red and white			
St Jude's	Templeogue	South Dublin	Navy and Sky Blue			
St Peregrine's	Clonsilla		Black and white			

== Qualification for subsequent competitions ==
At the end of the championship, the winning team qualify to the subsequent Leinster Junior Club Hurling Championship.

== List of finals ==
=== List of Dublin JAHC finals ===
Year	Winners		Runners-up	
Year	Club	Score	Club	Score
2026	Clanna Gael Fontenoy	1-16	St. Peregrine's	0-15
2025	Kevin's	0-19	Ballyboden St Enda's	0-15
2024	Crumlin	0–13	St. Peregrine's	0-08
2023	Good Counsel/Liffey Gaels	1–14	St Mark's	2-04
2022				
2021	Ballyboden St Enda's	0–16	Clanna Gael Fontenoy	0–10
2020	St Brigid's	0–17	Lucan Sarsfields	1–13
2019	Fingallians	0–13	St Jude's	0–11
2018	St Maur's	1–13	Naomh Mearnóg	0–11
2017	Erin's Isle	1–14	St Mark's	1–11
2016	Clontarf	1–16	Kilmacud Crokes	0-09
2015	Cuala	4-22	Scoil Ui Chonaill	3-08
2014	St Jude's	1–13	Ballyboden St Enda's	2-08
2013	Castleknock	0–14	Lucan Sarsfields	0-09
2012	Na Fianna	1–15	Faughs	1–10
2011	Parnells	2–13	Good Counsel	1-08
2010	Fingallians	2–11	St Jude's	2-09
2009	St Sylvester's	1–15	Clanna Gael Fontenoy	1-04
2008	St Brigid's		Naomh Barróg	
2007	Faughs	1–15	St Jude's	2-05
2006	St Vincent's		Whitehall Colmcille	
2005	St Brigid's		Naomh Barróg	
2004	Raheny			
2003	Ballinteer St John's			
2002	Kilmacud Crokes		Fingallians	
2001	St Oliver Plunkett's		Civil Service	
2000	Ballyboden St Enda's			
1999	Clanna Gael Fontenoy		Naomh Fionnbarra	
1998	St Patrick's, Palmerstown		Na Fianna	
1997	Setanta		Civil Service	
1996	St Jude's			
1995	Naomh Mearnóg			
1994	Trinity Gaels			
1993	Cuala	3-08	Trinity Gaels	0–11
1992	Kilmacud Crokes			
1991	Na Fianna			
1990	St Vincent's			
1989	St Jude's		St Vincent's	
1988	Ballyboden St Enda's		Cuala	
1987	St Brendan's			
1986	Na Fianna			
1985	Cuala			
1984	Faughs		Lucan Sarsfields	
1983	New Ireland			
1982	O'Tooles			
1981	Na Fianna			
1980	St Vincent's			
1979	Erin's Isle		An Caislean	
1978	Kevin's			
1977	Cuala		Kevin's	
1976	Young Ireland			
1975	New Ireland			
1974	Erin's Isle			
1973	Ballyboden St Enda's		St. Ita's, Portrane	
1972	Cuala Casements ^{A}	3–10	St Vincent's	0–11
1971	Aer Lingus			
1970	St Brendan's			
1969	Raheny			
1968	Clanna Gael			
1967	Dalkey Mitchels ^{A}	4-07	Clanna Gael	2-07
1966	Colmcille			
1965	Naomh Fionnbarra		Rialto	
1964	Craobh Chiaráin		Naomh Fionnbarra	
1963	St Columba's			
1962	Good Counsel			
1961	Civil Service			
1960	Aer Corps			
1959	St Ita's			
1958	Scoil Ui Chonaill			
1957	St Vincent's			
1956	Na Fianna			
1955	Guinness			
1954	St Columba's			
1953	Sean Treacys			
1952	Grocers			
1951	Lusk			
1950	St Dymphna's			
1949	Young Ireland			
1948	St Vincent's			
1947	Faughs			
1946	Eoghan Ruadh			
1945	Fontenoy			
1944	Faughs			
1943	St Vincents			
1942	Eoghan Ruadh			
1941	Con Colberts			
1940	Commercials			
1939	Kevin's			
1938	New Ireland			
1937	St Dympna's			
1936	Crokes			
1935	Unknown			
1934	Eoghan Ruadh			
1933	Round Towers Lusk			
1932	Army Metro			
1931	Erin's Isle			
1930	Young Ireland			
1929	Eoghan Ruadh			
1928	Collins Barracks			
1927	Banba			
1926	Civil Service		Parnells	
1925	Commercials			
1924				
1923				
1922				

==== Notes ====
A - Cuala Casements and Dalkey Mitchels merged to become Cuala in 1974

== Junior B Hurling Championship Roll of Honour ==
Year	Winner	Score	Opponent	Score
2026	St Patrick's, Palmerstown	0-18	Na Fianna	0-16
2025	Castleknock	0-17	Cuala	2-08
2024	Raheny	1-19	St Finian's, Swords	0-13
2023	Ballyboden St Enda's	0-18	Lucan Sarsfields	0-15
2022	St Oliver Plunketts ER	2-14	Faughs	2-13
2021	St Patrick's, Palmerstown	1-08	Commercials	0–10
2020	Skerries Harps	2–19	Craobh Chiaráin	2–13
2019	St Vincent's	2–15	Good Counsel / Liffey Gaels	0–17
2018	Cuala	1-21	Realt Dearg	2–11
2017	St Maur's	2-21	Faughs	1–14
2016	St Vincent's	3–12	Faughs	2-07
2015	St Brigid's	1–14	O'Tooles	0–16
2014	St. Oliver Plunkett's ER	2–16	Naomh Fionnbarra	0-09
2013	Clontarf	3–13	Scoil Ui Chonaill	0–12
2012	Lucan Sarsfields	2-14	St Finian's, Swords	1-04
2011	Cuala	0–11	Ballinteer St John's	0-04
2010	Parnells	2-09	Civil Service	1–10
2009	Good Counsel		Kilmacud Crokes	
2008				
2007				
2006	O'Dwyers			
2005				
2004	Naomh Barróg	2-09	St Brigid's	1-09
2003				
2002	St. Judes			
2001	St Brigid's		St Kevin's	
2000				
1999				
1998	Kilmacud Crokes			
1997	Cabinteely		St. Finian's, Swords	
1996	Ballyboden St Enda's			
1995	St Patrick's	1-15 (replay) (1–9)	Faughs	1-7 (0–12)
1994	Cabinteely		St. Finian's, Swords	
1993				

== Junior C Hurling Championship Roll of Honour ==
Year	Winner	Score	Opponent	Score
2026	Commercials	1-16	St Brendan's	1-12
2025	Clontarf	1-20	Naomh Barróg	1-12
2024	Wild Geese	0–14	Kilmacud Crokes	1-09
2023	Thomas Davis	1–15	Raheny	1–14
2022	Whitehall Colmcille	2–13	Na Fianna	0–17
2021	Lucan Sarsfields	1–17	Ballyboden St Enda's	2–11
2020	Lucan Sarsfields	3–15	St Sylvester's	2–15
2019	St Jude's	1–12	Castleknock	0–11
2018	Civil Service	1–12	Raheny	0–11
2017	Cuala	1–18	Realt Dearg	1–13
2016	Kilmacud Crokes	0–19	Skerries Harps	1–10
2015	Ballyboden St Enda's	3–12	Whitehall Colmcille	0–11
2014	Raheny	2–14	St Brendan's	1–13
2013	St Oliver Plunkett's ER	3–14	St Vincent's	1–17
2012	Faughs	2–10	O'Tooles	2-07
2011	St Maur's	2–11	Kevin's	0-06
2010	St Vincent's		Na Fianna	
2009	Ballinteer St John's			
2008	Erin's Isle	4-08	Cuala	1–12
2007	Craobh Chiaráin			
2006	Liffey Gaels		St Brigid's	
2005	St Brigid's	1–11	Liffey Gaels	1-07
2004	St Jude's			
2003	O'Dwyer's			
2002				
2001	St Maur's			
2000	Faughs			
1999	Clontarf			
1998	St Jude's			
1997				

== Junior D Hurling Championship Roll of Honour ==
Year	Winner	Score	Opponent	Score
2026	Trinity Gaels	0-24	Round Towers, Lusk	0-18
2025	Pobal Parnell	2-21	Faughs	1-08
2024	Castleknock		St Brigid's	
2023	Clontarf	1–13	Naomh Barróg	1–12
2022	St Brendan's	1–12	Round Towers, Lusk	1–11
2021	Thomas Davis	1–11	Na Fianna	0–10
2020	Na Fianna	0-23	Clontarf	1–16
2019	Lucan Sarsfields	3–14	Wild Geese	4-07
2018	St Joseph's OCB	1–14	Na Gaeil Óga	3-07
2017	Trinity Gaels	1–12	Setanta	0–10
2016	St Jude's	1–16	Cuala	0–13
2015	Skerries Harps	0-26	Realt Dearg	3–11
2014	Whitehall Colmcille	3–17	Naomh Olaf	0–13
2013	St Jude's	1–16	Castleknock	0–13
2012	Raheny	5-06	Kilmacud Crokes	2-09
2011	St Oliver Plunkett's ER	3–14	St Sylvester's	4-07
2010	Parnells	1–10	St Brendan's	1-03
2009	Na Fianna			
2008	Ballinteer St John's			
2007				
2006	Crumlin		Commercials	
2005				
2004	Thomas Davis		Civil Service	
1997	Ballinteer St John's			

== Junior E Hurling Championship Roll of Honour ==
Year	Winner	Score	Opponent	Score
2026	St Vincent's	1-22	St. James Gaels/An Caislean	3-12
2025	St Vincent's	2-20	St. Anne's	3-16
2024	Parnells		St Patrick's, Donabate	
2023				
2022				
2021	Naomh Barróg	3–13	Naomh Mearnóg	0–12
2020	Round Towers Lusk	2–13	Commercials	2–10
2019	Round Towers Clondalkin	1–14	Na Fianna	2–10
2018	St Brigid's	0–13	St Patrick's, Donabate	0–11
2017	St Joseph's OCB	1–11	Na Gaeil Óga	0–10
2016	Clontarf	4–12	Wild Geese	1–10
2015	Ballyboden St Enda's	3–11	Ballinteer St John's	1–14
2014	Setanta	0–15	Commercials	2-07
2013	Thomas Davis		Round Towers	
2012	St Mark's		Erin Go Bragh	
2011	Skerries Harps		Kilmacud Crokes	
2010	St Patrick's, Palmerstown		Setanta	
2009	Parnells		Commercials	
2008	Whitehall Colmcille		St Joseph's/OCB	
2007				

== Junior F Hurling Championship Roll of Honour ==
The 2020 Junior F Hurling Final was played between Castleknock and Fingallians in O'Toole Park.

Junior F Hurling Championship
- Irish: Craobh Shóisear Iomaint; Bhaile Átha Cliath
- Founded: 2010
- Title holders: Lucan Sarsfields (2nd title)
- First winner: Castleknock
- Sponsors: Benson & Hedges

Year	Winner	Score	Opponent	Score
2026	O'Dwyer's	1-19	Erin's Isle	3-11
2025	Lucan Sarsfields	0-16	St. James Gaels/An Caislean	0-13
2024	Stars of Erin		St. Anne's	
2023				
2022	Whitehall Colmcille	0-09	St Vincent's	0-07
2021	St Peregrines	1–14	Erin's Isle	2-09
2020	Fingallians	1-06	Castleknock	0-08
2019	Round Towers, Lusk	1–12, 1-11 (R)	Raheny	2-09, 1-08 (R)
2018	Erin Go Bragh	1–14	Fingallians	1-06
2017	Na Fianna	3-07	Whitehall Colmcille	1–11
2016	St Joseph's OCB	6–12	Realt Dearg	3–14
2015	Cuala		Clontarf	
2014	Ballinteer St John's	3–12	Wild Geese	1-05
2013	Lucan Sarsfields	1–14	O'Dwyer's	0–14
2012	St Oliver Plunketts/Eoghan Ruadh		Naomh Barróg	
2011	St Mark's		St Monica's	
2010	Castleknock			

== Junior G Hurling Championship Roll of Honour ==
The first ever Junior G Hurling Championship between St Vincents and Thomas Davis was never played due to the Government COVID-19 restrictions. The 2021 Final was played between St Monica's and St Vincent's

Junior G Hurling Championship
- Irish: Craobh Shóisear G Iomaint; Bhaile Átha Cliath
- Founded: 2020
- Title holders: TBA (1st title)
- First winner: TBA
- Sponsors: The Local Pub

Year	Winner	Score	Opponent	Score
2026	Ranelagh Gaels	0-17	Naomh Barróg	1-13
2025	Geraldine P. Moran's	4-08	Kevin's	0-08
2024	St. James Gaels/An Caislean		O'Dwyer's	
2023				
2022				
2021	St Vincent's	1–15	St Monica's	1-07

== Junior H Hurling Championship Roll of Honour ==
The first ever Junior H Hurling Championship Final was between Round Towers Clondalkin and Portobello

Junior H Hurling Championship
- Irish: Craobh Shóisear H Iomaint; Bhaile Átha Cliath
- Founded: 2020
- Title holders: Round Towers Lusk; Clanna Gael Fontenoy
- First winner: Portobello
- Sponsors: Go-Ahead Ireland

Year	Winner	Score	Opponent	Score
2026 (North)	Round Towers Lusk	2-11	St Finian's (Swords)	3-05
2026 (South)	Clanna Gael Fontenoy	4-19	St Kevin's Killians	5-09
2025	Ranelagh	2-23	Naomh Barróg	3-19
2024	Beann Eadair		Fingallians	
2023				
2022				
2021	Portobello	1–15	Round Towers Clondalkin	0–11

== See also ==
- Dublin Senior 1 Hurling Championship (Tier 1)
- Dublin Senior 2 Hurling Championship (Tier 2)
- Dublin Senior 3 Hurling Championship (Tier 3)
- Dublin Intermediate Hurling Championship (Tier 4)
