= Liam Rushe =

Irish hurler (born 1990)

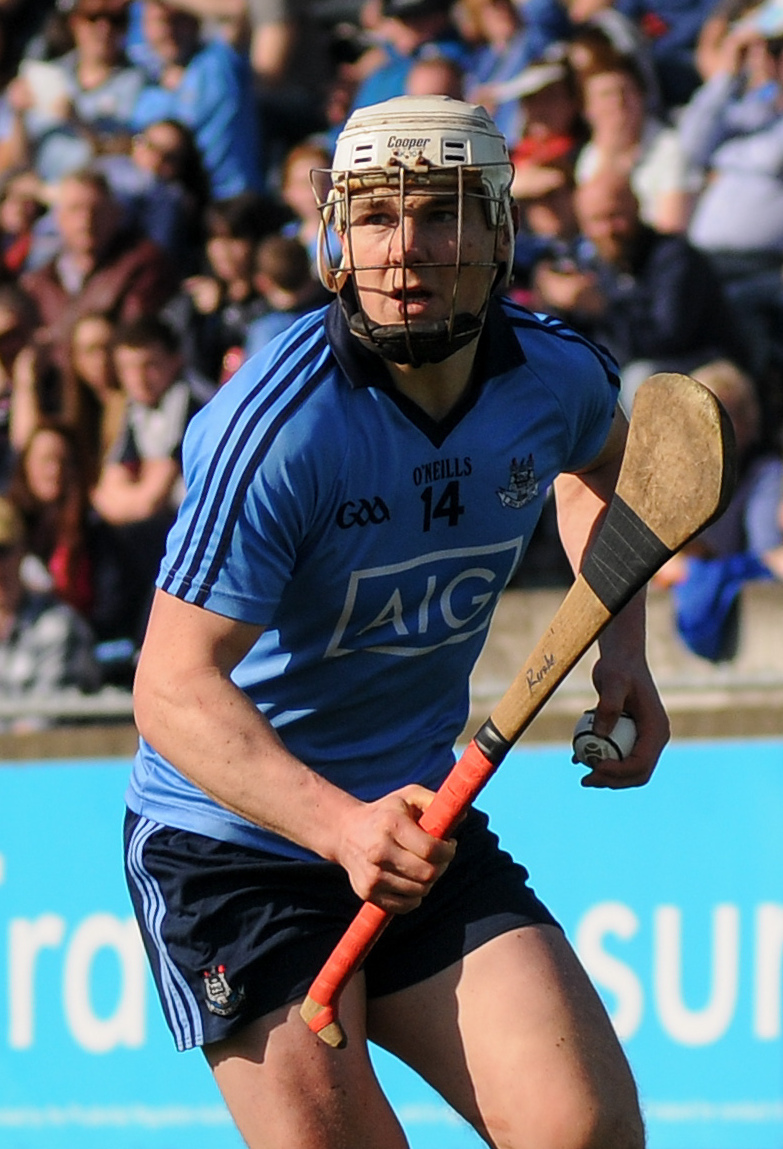
- Rushe in 2015

Personal information
- Native name: Liam Ó Luachra (Irish)
- Born: 18 June 1990 (age 36) Dublin, Ireland
- Occupation: Accountant
- Height: 1.88 m (6 ft 2 in)

Sport
- Sport: Hurling
- Position: Half-back
Clubs
- Years: Club
- 2007–2020 2021–: St Patrick's, Palmerstown; Na Fianna
Club titles
- Dublin titles: 2
- Leinster titles: 1
- All-Ireland Titles: 1
Inter-county
Years	County	Apps (scores)
2009–2026	Dublin	14 (3-15)
Inter-county titles
- Leinster titles: 1
- All-Irelands: 0
- NHL: 1
- All Stars: 2

Liam Rushe (born 18 June 1990) is an Irish hurler who plays for Dublin Senior Championship club Na Fianna and formerly at inter-county level with the Dublin senior hurling team.

Rushe made his first appearance for the team during the 2009 championship and has become a regular member of the starting fifteen since then. During that time he has won one Leinster Senior Hurling Championship winner's medal (2013) one National Hurling League winner's medal and has been a runner-up in two Leinster finals.

At club level Rushe originally played with St Patrick's, Palmerstown before transferring to Na Fianna. Rushe did both his primary and secondary schooling through Irish. He is a fluent Irish speaker and does match commentary work with TG4.

== Playing career ==
=== Club ===
As a member of the St Patrick's, Palmerstown club, he won a county club 'B' championship title in 2008.

Rushe transferred from his home club St Patrick's, Palmerstown to Na Fianna ahead of the 2021 season and has gone on to win a senior county title in 2023.

=== Minor and under-21 ===
Rushe first came to prominence on the inter-county scene in 2007 as a member of the Dublin minor hurling team in 2007. He won a Leinster title that year following a 2–14 to 1–10 defeat of Kilkenny.

By 2010 Rushe had joined the Dublin under-21 hurling team. He won a Leinster title in that grade that year following a 2–15 to 0–15 defeat of Wexford.

Rushe's side retained their provincial title in 2011 following another comprehensive defeat of Wexford. He was named man of the match for his performance in that game. Dublin later played in the All-Ireland final against Galway, however, they were beaten by 3–14 to 1–10.

=== Senior ===
Rushe had recently finished up with the minor grade team when he made his senior championship debut at full-forward in a Leinster quarter-final game against Antrim. The Dublin team subsequently qualified for a first Leinster final in eighteen years. However Kilkenny won the match with a 2–18 to 0–18 score line.

After a disappointing championship in 2010, Dublin qualified for the National Hurling League final in 2011, their first decider in over seventy years. A 0–22 to 1–7 victory over Kilkenny gave Rushe a National League winners' medal. Dublin and Kilkenny would play again in the Leinster final that day, however, the result was reversed on this occasion. A 4–17 to 1–15 score line gave victory to Kilkenny. In spite of this defeat Dublin remained in the championship and reached an All-Ireland semi-final against reigning All-Ireland champions Tipperary. However, Tipperary narrowly won by 1–19 to 0–18. Rushe finished off the season by winning his very first All-Star award while he was also named All-Stars Young Hurler of the Year.

In October 2026, Rushe announced his retirement from inter-county hurling.

== Honours ==
Dublin

- Leinster Senior Hurling Championship (1): 2013
- Leinster Under-21 Hurling Championship (2): 2010, 2011
- Leinster Minor Hurling Championship (1): 2007
- National Hurling League (1): 2011
- National Hurling Division 1B (1): 2013

St Patrick's Palmerstown

- Dublin Senior B Hurling Championship (1): 2008

Leinster

- Interprovincial Championship (1): 2012

Personal

- All-Star Awards (2): 2011, 2013
- All Stars Young Hurler of the Year (1): 2011

Sporting positions
Preceded by Johnny McCaffrey	Dublin Senior Hurling Captain; 2015–2017	Succeeded by Chris Crummey
Awards
Preceded by Brendan Maher (Tipperary)	All Stars Young Hurler of the Year; 2011	Succeeded by Johnny Coen (Galway)
