= Robbie Boyle =

Dublin Gaelic footballer

Personal information
- Native name: Roibeard Ó Baoill (Irish)
- Born: Dublin, Ireland

Sport
- Sport: Gaelic football
- Position: Forward
Club
- Years: Club
- ?–?: Erin's Isle
Inter-county
- Years: County
- ?: Dublin
Inter-county titles
- Leinster titles: ?
- All-Irelands: 1
- All Stars: 0

Robert 'Robbie' Boyle is a former Gaelic footballer. He played for the Erin's Isle club and for the Dublin county team.

== Football career ==
He won an all-Ireland medal with Dublin in 1995, with an appearance as a substitute.
