= Erin's Isle GAA =

Gaelic games club in Finglas, Dublin, Ireland

Erin's Isle
- CLG Oileán na hÉireann
- Founded: 1917
- County: Dublin
- Nickname: The Parish, The Isles
- Colours: Green with black band
- Grounds: Farnham Drive, Finglas
- Coordinates: 53°23′03.39″N 6°17′52.64″W

Playing kits
Standard colours

Senior Club Championships
	All Ireland	Leinster champions	Dublin champions
Football:	-	1	2
Hurling:	-	-	1
Camogie:	-	-	1

Erin's Isle (Irish: Oileán na hÉireann) is a Gaelic games club in Finglas, Dublin, Ireland.

The club has won the Dublin Senior Football Championship on two occasions, in 1993 and 1997. It also won the Leinster Senior Club Football Championship in 1997, and contested the final of the 1997–98 All-Ireland Senior Club Football Championship, losing to Corofin.

Erin's Isle won the Dublin Juvenile Football Championship for the first time in 1983 and the Dublin Minor Football Championship for the first time in 1985. The club has won the Dublin Senior Hurling Championship on one occasion, in 1983.

== Notable players ==
Football

- Keith Barr – former Dublin player
- Robbie Boyle – former Dublin player
- P. J. Buckley – former Dublin player
- Mick Deegan – former Dublin player
- Charlie Redmond – former Dublin player
- Sheamus – WWE wrestler

Hurling

- Thomas Moore – former Dublin player
- John Twomey – former Dublin player

== Honours ==
- Leinster Senior Club Football Championship Winners 1997-98
- Dublin Senior Football Championship Winners (2) 1993, 1997
- Dublin Senior Hurling Championship Winners 1983
- Dublin Senior B Hurling Championship: Winner 2000
- Dublin Junior Football Championship Winners 1953, 2007
- Dublin Under 21 A Football Championship: Winner 1979
- Dublin Under 21 B Football Championship: Winner 2010
- Dublin Under 21 C Football Championship: Winner 2018
- Dublin Minor A Football Championship Winner 1985
- Dublin Senior Football League Division 2 Winners 1982, 2009
- Dublin Senior Hurling League Division 2 Winner 2006
- Dublin Intermediate Hurling League Division 3 Winners 2012, 2017
- Dublin Junior Hurling Championship Winners (3) 1974, 1979, 2017
- Dublin Junior C Hurling Championship Winners 2008
- Dublin Minor A Hurling Championship Winners 1983
- Dublin Minor C Hurling Championship Winners 2014, 2016, 2021
- Dublin Minor Hurling League Division 1 Winners 1997, 1998
- Dublin Senior Camogie Championship Winners 2003
- Dublin Senior B Camogie Championship: Winners 2014
- Dublin Intermediate Camogie Championship: Winners 2020
- Dublin Ladies Junior B Football Championship winners 2025
- Dublin Ladies Div 4 league and cup winners 2022
- Dublin Ladies Junior F Football Championship: Winners 2014
- Dublin Ladies Junior C Football Championship: Winners 2017
- Dublin Ladies Minor C Football Championship: Winners 2018, 2021
