= Setanta Hurling Club (Dublin) =

Gaelic games club in Ballymun, Ireland

Setanta
- Cumann Báire Setanta
- Founded: 1980
- County: Dublin
- Colours: Navy blue, Sky blue
- Grounds: Clubteach Setanta, Ballymun Road, Dublin
- Coordinates: 53.3908°N 6.2650°W

Playing kits

Setanta Hurling Club (Irish: Cumann Báire Setanta) is a hurling club in Ballymun in Dublin, Ireland. The club, which was formed in the 1980s, is concerned with the games of hurling and camogie and plays in the Senior 3 division of the Dublin Senior Hurling Championship. The club's clubhouse and pitch are adjacent to the Ballymun Library.

== History ==
Setanta Hurling Club was established, in the early 1980s, because "there was no hurling outlet" for local children after they left the local primary school. The primary school's headmaster at the time, Padraig Ó hEarcain, assisted in setting-up the club. In 1983, the club won a Division IV Féile na nGael title in Croke Park.

In 1991, Setanta reached the Juvenile Hurling championships for the first time, but were knocked-out after being defeated by Crumlin GAA. In June 1993, a team representing the club defeated Naomh Barrog in the Junior C Hurling Championship final. After winning a Junior "A" Hurling League match against St Sylvester's at Malahide Castle in July 1995, the club were re-graded to the intermediate league. Niall Scully, reporting on the match for the Evening Herald, described the club's "rise from Junior 'D' five years ago to Intermediate next season" as "Highly commendable progress".

In March 1996, The Evening Herald reported on the club's first season playing at Intermediate grade, noting that the "Ballymun Blitz continues as stylish Setanta come up in the world on Dublin hurling".

In August 2000, Setanta lost a match against St Vincent's in the Intermediate final, a match that would've advanced them to the senior status. The following weekend, Setanta defeated Craobh Chiaráin and advanced to senior status, making them the first club to ever play senior hurling in Ballymun. When the club was founded, it aimed to achieve senior status by 2000.

In 2008, in an Evening Herald article which described Setanta as one of "Dublin's best loved clubs", club member Padraig Ó Maoilsteighe was quoted as expressing "sheer frustration" at changes to how hurling games in Dublin were arranged and "irate" that only one competitive game had been scheduled over "three hurling weekends".

In 2014, the club played a friendly match against Nihon Gaels, a mixed hurling team made up of members of Dublin City University's Japanese Society. The match was recorded and turned into a short film called "Hurling: Nihon Gaels vs Setanta" which was archived to the Irish Film Institute's Ballymun Community Films collection. Another similar event was held in 2015, and it was attended by GAA President Aogán Ó Fearghail, former Dublin GAA chief John Costello, Dublin County Board chairman Seán Shanley and representatives of the Japanese Embassy.

In October 2014, Setanta made it to the Dublin Senior 'B' final advancing to Senior A status for the 2015 season. Also in October 2014, Setanta claimed the Dublin Junior 'E' Hurling Championship title after beating Commercials 4-3 to 3-3 at O'Toole Park in Crumlin. The Herald described the club as "one of Dublin's great hurling clubs" after they made their Dublin Senior Hurling 'A' Championship debut in 2015.

In 2018, representatives of the club asked the then Minister of State at the Department of Health (with responsibility for the National Drugs Strategy), Catherine Byrne, to "take 'immediate action' to tackle a crack cocaine epidemic" in the area. An article in DublinLive.ie suggested that two former players had been "dealing drugs in Ballymun" and that "the situation had become so bad the Setanta chairperson Eilis Ni Chearnaigh appeared on The Late Late Show [..] to speak about it".

In 2020, Setanta beat Na Fianna 5-19 to 0-16 in the Dublin Senior Hurling Championship at St. Mobhi Road in Glasnevin.

In 2021, Setanta built and opened a new hurling wall. An article in the Irish Independent, covering its official opening, noted that it was "week to remember for Setanta, on and off the pitch" as Setanta were in three adult finals at the time.

In June 2022, Setanta defeated Naomh Maur 4-16 to 2-19 in Rush to win the Division 3 league title. Niall Scully, writing for the Irish Independent described it as a "joyous day for the Ballymun club". Later that year, in October 2022, Setanta was featured in an episode of the third season of TG4's children's TV show C.L.U.B.

== Facilities ==
As of the mid-1990s, Setanta Hurling Club was playing on the grounds of Ballymun Comprehensive (now Trinity Comprehensive School) and undertaking indoor training at the Poppintree Sports Complex. Both the club's changings room in Balcurris, and a flat near the pitch which had made available to the club by Dublin Corporation, were damaged by vandals in this period. While it had reportedly been proposed, by Dublin Corporation, to "ban" hurling and football from the pitch used by the club, the Corporation confirmed in May 1996 this proposal wouldn't be moving forward.

In 2000, the club was promised land by Dublin Corporation that would allow them to build a new clubhouse. Later that year, after a survey was carried out to gauge interest in Gaelic games locally, Setanta applied to Dublin Corporation's successor Dublin City Council for planning permission to build their clubhouse between Ballymun Library and Ballymun Comprehensive School (now Trinity Comprehensive School) on Ballymun Road. Setanta also requested five additional pitches. Planning permission was granted for the clubhouse and pitches in the same year as part of the regeneration of Ballymun.

Clubteach Setanta, on the Ballymun Road, is the club's main club house. Its facilities include a hurling wall and all-weather floodlit (Astro) pitch.

== Honours ==
- Dublin Junior A Hurling Championship (1): 1997
- Dublin Junior E Hurling Championship (1): 2014
