= Civil Service Hurling Club =

Irish hurling club

Civil Service hurling Club
- Founded: 1923
- County: Dublin
- Nickname: none
- Colours: maroon, yellow, white
- Grounds: Islandbridge

Civil Service Hurling Club (Irish: Cumann Báire na Státseirbhíse ) is a hurling club in county Dublin GAA. The club was founded in 1923 by members of the Irish Civil Service. It currently field two adult hurling teams, in Division 5 and 8 and play in the Junior A and E Hurling championships. They share a ground at Islandbridge with the Civil Service Gaelic Football Club.

== History ==
Founded in 1923, the club's first hurling practice took place in October 1923 at the former British Army Polo grounds on the Navan Road. The club played its first competitive match in the Dublin Junior hurling league on 19 May 1924 against Pioneers, losing by two goals. In 1926, the club won its first league title and its first championship having gone the season unbeaten. In 1929, the club won the Intermediate league and in 1934, an U-21 league. In 1935 Service won the Corn Ceitin. Their path to victory was somewhat unusual however. The club had received a walkover in the semi-final from Crokes, and as a result were to play Banba in the final which they did ending in a draw. In the meantime, Crokes persuaded the board to refix their semi final and so Service were now forced to play Crokes who they beat. The replay against Banba took place which the club won.

In 1938 an interclub committee meeting between Civil Service Hurling, Gaelic football and Camogie clubs took place in order to attain a common goal; their own grounds. Islandbridge came on stream as a result in 1944. A former dump, transformation to a level playing pitch was a difficult task with arable soil difficult to come by. The clubs managed to obtain around 600 tons of good soil from Ballyfermot where building was in progress for the foundations of what is now suburb of Dublin. The club was able to cover the cost of the soil through a grant from the unemployment relief scheme. The club developed a club house and changing rooms starting out with a two mini apartment wooden hut – without water or sanitation. Development was difficult due to the scarcity of building materials after World War II, resulting in a statutory limit of £750 outlay on recreational buildings. Using voluntary labour, the club dug out the foundations for a new four-apartment concrete building with hot and cold showers and sanitation in 1947 and developed by 1951.

The club's senior status which they had obtained in when they won the Intermediate Championship was lost in 1948 and regained again in 1949 when they won their second Intermediate championship. In 1949 the club was fielding two teams at senior and junior level. The senior team won the Corn Ceitin while the junior team reached both league and championship final, losing in both. The club's success resulted in four members of the club being selected to the Dublin panel which won in the Leinster junior hurling championship in 1950. The Junior team won the Junior A league and Smyth cup in 1952. The Senior team reached their first ever Senior hurling championship final having beaten Young Irelands in semi final. They were defeated by St. Vincents. Nine members of the team that had played inter county hurling at some stage with counties Wicklow, Dublin, Clare, Laois, Cork and Waterford. The club reached the semi-final of the Senior championship the following year but won the senior league. The junior league won the Miller Shield in 1958. In 1961 the junior team won the championship and the following year they won the intermediate championship. In 1964 the club won Senior League Division 2.

The 1960s saw new difficulties facing the club and indeed other Dublin clubs who depended on players from the country resident in Dublin. The advent of the five-day week, the allowing of players resident outside their native county to play with that county, transport out of Dublin becoming more easily available. These and others resulted in the end to the days where people would arrive in Dublin from the country in the summer and not travel home again until Christmas time. The club continued to compete despite these difficulties at senior level and in 1973 were runners up in Senior league Division 2 and promoted to Division 1. The junior team won the Junior A league in 1976. The club embarked on a successful run from 1983 to 1986 winning the 1983 Intermediate League after a top Four playoff, the Intermediate League in 1984, the Junior League in 1985, an Intermediate league and championship in 1986, Doyle Cup in 1986, the Naas Tournament in 1986 and the Leixlip Tournament in the same year. The club returned to Senior status in 1987 however by 1989 they were reduced to fielding a single team and nearly disbanded.

The club dropped down to Junior status winning the Miller shield in 1992 and in 1993 won the Junior League, Junior B championship and retained the Miller Shield. The club continued to experience difficulty in fielding until 1995 when a successful recruitment drive gave them sufficient numbers. The club won the Corn Fag a Bealach in 1996. The club won the Corn Fag a Bealach again and reached the Junior hurling championship final the following year, losing to Setanta of Ballymun. The club celebrated 75 years in existence in 2001. Since 2002 the club has had a golf society. One of the club's players who is from Buenos Aires, Argentina was featured in an article in the Irish Independent called Juan Facundo Contreras.

== Roll of honour ==
- Dublin Junior Hurling League 1926, 1952, 1957, 1976
- Dublin Junior Hurling Championship 1926, 1961
- Dublin Intermediate Hurling League 1929, 1983, 1984, 1986
- Dublin Under 21 Hurling League 1934
- Corn Ceitin 1935, 1949
- Dublin Intermediate Hurling Championship 1949, 1958, 1962, 1985
- Smyth Cup 1952
- Dublin Senior Hurling Championship Runners Up 1952
- Dublin Senior Hurling League 1957
- Miller Shield 1958, 1992, 1993
- Dublin Senior Hurling League Division 2 1964
- Dublin Junior B Hurling League 1985, 1993
- Doyle Cup 1986
- Naas Tournament 1986
- Leixlip Tournament 1986
- Dublin Junior B Hurling League 1993
- Corn Fag a Bealach 1996, 1997
- Tobin Cup 2004
- Dublin Junior C Hurling Championship 2018
- Adult Hurling League 6 Winners 2022

== Notable people ==
- James Andrew Walsh - Played in the 1934 All-Ireland Final representing the Civil Service.
