= St Patrick's GAA (Palmerstown) =

Gaelic games club in County Dublin, Ireland

St Patrick's GAA Club
- Cumann Naomh Pádraig, Baile Phámar—Seipeal Iosolde
- Founded: 1961
- County: Dublin
- Nickname: Pats
- Colours: Red and White
- Grounds: Glenaulin Park, Palmerstown
- Coordinates: 53°20′48.35″N 6°21′51.35″W

Playing kits
Standard colours

St Patrick's are a Gaelic Athletic Association club located in Chapelizod and Palmerstown, South Dublin.

== History ==
The club was founded in 1961 and took its name because that was the Patrician year. The club colours came about as one of the founders, Peter Kavanagh, had two sets of jerseys, one green and the other red. Originally the main colours were to be green and white (the colours of Saint Patrick and the shamrock) but because neighbouring clubs Round Towers and Lucan Sarsfields used green and white, it was decided to use red and white and keep the green as second colours.

The first match to ever take place was the U13’s against Round Towers of Clondalkin, which John Daly (founder and current club president) refereed. The match took place in a field where the Assembly Hall and St Brigid's School currently stands today.

The first championship won was U16 1/2 football in 1966. St Patrick's have traditionally been stronger in football but in recent times have enjoyed more success on the hurling front. St Patrick's won the Dublin Junior Hurling Championship for the first time in 1998. The club gained Senior hurling status for the first time in 2004 when they lifted the Dublin Intermediate Hurling Championship. In 2008 they lifted the Dublin Senior B Hurling Championship, thus gaining promotion to the Dublin Senior Hurling Championship.

In the same season, the St Patrick's footballers lifted the Dublin AFL Division 3 title resulting in promotion to Dublin AFL Division 2. More success was to follow in 2009 for the footballers as they won the Dublin Intermediate Football Championship and gaining promotion to the Dublin Senior Football Championship.

Most recent success has come in winning the 2013 Dublin AHL Division 2 and promotion to the Dublin Senior Hurling League.

== Achievements ==
- Dublin Senior B Hurling Championship: Winners 2008
- Dublin Intermediate Football Championship: Winners 2009
- Dublin Minor B Football Championship Winners 2006
- Dublin Intermediate Hurling Championship: Winners 2004
- Dublin Junior Hurling Championship: Winners 1998
- Dublin Junior B Hurling Championship: Winners 1995, 2021
- Dublin Senior Hurling League Division 2 Winners 2013

== Players ==
- Liam Rushe
