= Fingallians GAA =

Gaelic games club in County Dublin, Ireland

Fingallians
- Fine Ghallainn
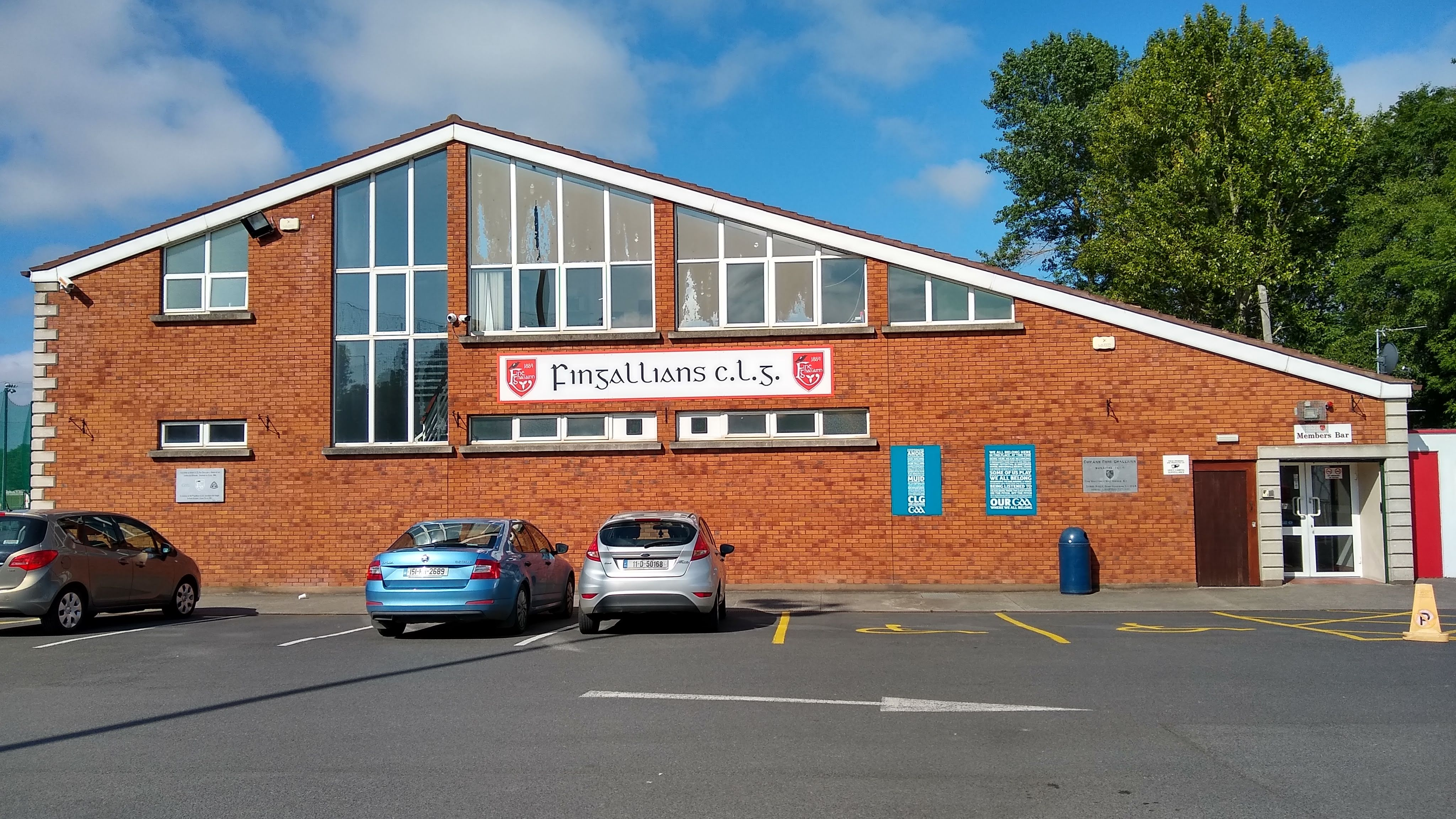
- Founded: 1884
- County: Dublin
- Nickname: Fins
- Colours: Red and White
- Grounds: Lawless Memorial Park
- Coordinates: 53°27′58.33″N 6°12′47.13″W

Playing kits
Standard colours

Senior Club Championships
	All Ireland	Leinster champions	Dublin champions
Ladies' football:	–	–	1

Fingallians is a Gaelic Athletic Association club in Swords, County Dublin, Ireland. Founded in 1884, Fingallians are one of the oldest clubs in Dublin and they are based at Lawless Memorial Park.

== History ==
The club caters for Gaelic football, hurling, Ladies football and camogie, at all age groups. They currently play football in the Dublin Intermediate Football Championship, having been relegated from the senior grade in 2011. They have never won the Dublin Senior Football Championship but won the Intermediate Championship in 1957.

Fingallians have reached the Dublin Intermediate Football Championship final in the three seasons they have played at the grade since being relegated. They lost finals by four points to Cuala in 2012 and to Naomh Ólaf in 2013 and by three points to Castleknock in 2014.

== Notable players ==
Among the noted Fingallians players from the past are Kieran Duff, Paul Flynn and Harry Keegan. Keegan won three All Stars with Roscommon in the 1970s and 1980s, while Duff played at right-half-forward in the Dublin team that won the 1983 All-Ireland Senior Football Championship final. Flynn became the most decorated individual player in the club's history by winning four successive All Stars, while also representing Ireland in the International Rules Series.

- Kieran Duff
- Paul Flynn
- Darragh Power
- Graham O'Brien
- Cameron Dooley

== Achievements ==
- Dublin Ladies' Senior Football Championship Winners 2013
- Dublin Intermediate Football Championship Winners 1957, 2016
- Dublin Junior Football Championship Winners 1942, 1956, 1993
- Dublin Junior B Football Championship: Winners 2015
- Dublin Junior D Football Championship: Winners 2013
- Dublin Junior Hurling Championship Winners 2010, 2019
- Dublin Intermediate Hurling champions 2021
- Leinster Special Junior Hurling Championship Winners (1) 2010
- Dublin Minor B Football Championship: Winners 2008
- Dublin Senior Football League Division 1 Winners 1931
- Dublin AFL Division 2 Winners 1984
- Dublin AFL Div. 3 Winners 2017
- Dublin AFL Div. 11 North Winners 2015
- Dublin Junior Hurling Championship Winners 2010
