= St Sylvester's GAA =

Sports club in County Dublin, Ireland

St Sylvester's
- Naomh Sailbheastar CLG
- Founded: 1903
- County: Dublin
- Colours: Blue with a green sash
- Coordinates: 53°27′00.54″N 6°09′13.89″W

Playing kits
Standard colours

Senior Club Championships
	All Ireland	Leinster champions	Dublin champions
Football:	0	0	1

St Sylvester's is a Gaelic Athletic Association club based in Malahide, Fingal, Ireland. The club was founded in 1903 and last won the Dublin Senior Football Championship in 1996. The club plays hurling, camogie and Men's and Women's Gaelic football. In 1996, they became the only Fingal to win the Dublin Senior Football championship when they defeated Erins Isle in the final.

== Notable players ==
=== Senior inter-county men's footballers ===
Dublin

- Keith Galvin
- John Leonard
- Shay Keogh

- Declan Rooney

Louth

- Darren Clarke
- Benny Gaughran

Galway

- Niall Finnegan
- Ray Silke
- Brian Talty

=== Senior inter-county ladies' footballers ===
Dublin

- Sinéad Aherne, Dublin county captain
- Niamh McEvoy

== Achievements ==
- Dublin Senior Football Championship: 1996
- Leinster Senior Club Football Championship: Runners-Up 1996-97
- Dublin Junior Football Championship: 1989, 1963, 1939
- Dublin Junior B Football Championship Winner 1999, 2014
- Dublin Junior D Football Championship Winner 2009, 2022
- Dublin Minor Football Championship: 1992, 2000, 2001
- Dublin AFL Division 1: 2010
- Dublin AFL Division 2: 2022
- Dublin AFL Div. 7 Winner 2012
- Dublin AFL Div. 10 Winner 2018
- Dublin Junior Hurling Championship: 2009
- Leinster Special Junior Hurling Championship Winners (1) 2009
- Dublin Intermediate Hurling Championship: 2012
- Dublin Under 21 B Football Championship: 2016
- Dublin Under 21 C Hurling Championship Winner 2017, 2006
- Dublin Minor C Hurling Championship Winners 2011
- Dublin Minor D Hurling Championship Winners 2023
