= Clontarf GAA =

Irish Gaelic Athletic Association club

- CLG Cluain Tarbh
- Founded: 1961
- County: Dublin
- Nickname: The Tarf
- Colours: Red & White
- Grounds: Seafield Road Clubhouse/St Anne's Park
- Coordinates: 53°21′49.65″N 6°11′54.12″W

Playing kits
Standard colours

Clontarf GAA is a Gaelic Athletic Association club based in Clontarf, Dublin, Ireland.

== Notable players ==
- Chris Barrett
- Jack McCaffrey
- Noel McCaffrey
- Jim Ronayne
- Martin Doran
- Nathan Doran

== Honours ==
- Dublin AFL Div. 3 Winners 2014
- Dublin AFL Div. 5 Winners 2018
- Dublin AFL Div. 6 Winners 2016
- Dublin AFL Div. 9 Winners 2019
- Dublin AFL Div. 11 North Winners 2014
- Dublin Minor A Hurling Championship Winners 2024
- Dublin Minor A Football Championship Winners 2016
- Dublin Minor C Football Championship Winners 2007
- Dublin Under 21 B Football Championship: Winners 2018
- Dublin Junior B Hurling Championship Winners 2013
- Dublin Junior C Hurling Championship Winners 1999
- Dublin Junior E Hurling Championship Winners 2016
- Dublin Junior 6 Football Championship Winners 2020
