= Ballinteer St John's GAA =

Sports club in County Dublin, Ireland

Ballinteer St John's
- Cumann Naomh Eoin Baile an tSaoir
- Founded: 1982
- County: Dublin
- Coordinates: 53°16′29.44″N 6°15′47.56″W

Playing kits
Standard colours

Ballinteer St John's (Irish: Naomh Eoin Bhaile an tSaoir) is a Gaelic Athletic Association club based in Ballinteer, Dún Laoghaire–Rathdown, Ireland. Gaelic football and hurling are played.

== History ==
The clubhouse is situated beside Marlay Park just off the Ballinteer bypass and junction 13 on the M50. It was founded in May 1982. Initially the chosen name was Ballinteer Gaels though the name was later changed to Ballinteer St Johns. The club's crest is made up of Three Castles (Dublin crest), The Eagle (Emblem of St John the Evangelist) and the Celtic Cross (GAA emblem). A large clubhouse, Áras Naomh Eoin, was opened in 2003.

In December 2020, former Laois inter-county footballer Seán Dempsey was named as manager of the club's team competing in the Dublin Senior Football Championship.

== Notable players ==
- Coman Goggins: All Star who captained Dublin to the 2002 Leinster SFC title, international rules player, the club's first player to play for the Dublin senior team

== Honours ==
- Dublin Senior B Hurling Championship: (1) 2010
- Dublin Intermediate Football Championship: (1) 1998
- Dublin Junior C Football Championship (3) 2007, 2008, 2015
- Dublin Junior Hurling Championship: (1) 2003
- Dublin Junior C Hurling Championship (1) 2009
- Dublin Junior D Hurling Championship (1) 2008
- Dublin Junior F Hurling Championship (1) 2014
- Dublin Under 21 A Football Championship: (2) 2022, 2025
- Dublin Under 21 B Football Championship: (2) 2012, 2021
- Dublin Under 21 C Football Championship: (1) 2008
- Dublin AFL Division 2 (1) 2002
- Dublin AFL Div. 7 Winners 2002
- Dublin AFL Div. 8 Winners 2012
- Dublin Minor B Hurling Championship Winners(2) 2018,2021
- Dublin Minor B Football Championship Winners 2012
