= Naomh Maur CLG =

Gaelic games club in County Dublin, Ireland

St Maur's
- Naomh Maur
- Founded: 1928
- County: Dublin
- Colours: Maroon and gold
- Grounds: Park Road, Rush, County Dublin
- Coordinates: 53°31′57.05″N 6°06′28.98″W

Playing kits
Standard colours

Naomh Maur is a Gaelic Athletic Association club based in Rush, County Dublin, Ireland. The club was founded in 1928.

== History ==
Naomh Maur G.A.A. club is based in Rush, Fingal, North County Dublin. Rush is a farming and market gardening area, seventeen miles from Dublin City. Football was played in the area between local Parish Teams prior to the foundation of the G.A.A. in 1884. It is believed that a Club called "Emerald Isles" existed c. 1900, but there are no records to support this. After an unsuccessful attempt to set up a Club between 1914 and 1919, local Curate Fr. Skeehan organised football games in the local school.

In 1928, two Gardaí, Tom MacCarville and Peter Fallon, who were stationed in Rush, and local G.A.A enthusiast Mick Jones called a meeting. The meeting was held on 28 June 1928 and St. Maurs G.A.A Club was founded. Mick Jones was elected chairman. The club colours were a maroon jersey with a gold diagonal sash, which remain with the club to the present day.

In the club's first year, it won the Division 3 Championship and progressed to win the Division 2 title in 1929–30. St. Maurs entered the Division 1 league in 1930 and subsequent to this the "Big team" or "A team" never played below this level. In 1936, the club embarked on a tour to Liverpool to play against a team of Irish farm workers, and St. Maurs won the game. Under the guidance of Mick Jones, the club had built a solid foundation and continued to grow. The 1940s were a quiet time, with many founding players "hanging up their boots", though giving assistance to their younger replacements. Pat Butterly succeeded Mick Jones as chairman in 1949 and did Trojan work with the young players. They qualified to play in the Dublin Junior Football Championship but lost. However, on 23 December 1951, they beat Skerries Harps in Parnell Park to give the club its first Dublin County Championship. This game is still spoken about as a huge crowd packed to Parnell Park to see the game. St. Maurs won by two points.

A prominent player was Séamus (Jim) McGuinnes, who progressed to the Dublin Senior Team where he became one of the finest footballers of that era. Injury cut short his Inter-County career, but not before he won a National League medal and played in the semi-final against Kerry. Liam (Willie) Price was elected chairman in 1950 and over the next forty-four years he led the club with great skill, style and dedication. After the club won the 1951 Championship, Price set to obtain a pitch; nine acres on the west side of the Parmer Estate were purchased from the Land Commission in 1958. With the willing hands of the Rush men, the field was turned into one of the finest pitches in Ireland. The pitch and new dressing rooms were opened in 1961 with Dublin and Kildare playing in a Senior Football Challenge.

During the 1960s, the club established a good Juvenile section and by the late 1960s things were taking shape. The 1970s brought a golden era to Naomh Maur. 1972 saw the club win its second Dublin Junior Championship and in 1973 Senior status was achieved for the first time by winning the Intermediate title. The club stayed Senior for eleven years and won a Senior League title during that time, but fell back to Intermediate football in 1985. In 1986, the club qualified to play in Croke Park against a rejuvenated and star-studded Garda team which included Ashley Sullivan (Wicklow), Davy Byrne (Monaghan) and John McGrath (Tipperary). Naomh Maur won by 2–8 to 0–10. The final was against Round Towers of Lusk, which had a few relations playing against each other. The final was played in The Naul and a massive crowd were present for a superb game which St. Maurs won by 11 points to 6. During the club's first spell in Senior Football, the need for a clubhouse was realised and Áras Naomh Maur was opened in 1983. A huge amount of work was done by the committee with the kindness and generosity of the people. The club gained a top-class handball alley, squash court, three badminton courts, basketball court, kitchen, changing rooms, meeting rooms and a lounge bar. The club remained Senior for a few years but slipped back to Intermediate football.

The 1990s brought about many changes and a big juvenile policy from 1993 is aimed at returning the club to Senior football. 1994 saw the end of a forty-four-year term as chairman for Liam Price, who had done much for the association and Club. Liam is now club president and ever-present at games.

Brendan Harpur took over as chairman in 1994 and served for three very fruitful years, placing an emphases on juvenile development and coaching. A native of Co. Tyrone, Brendan was the first person from outside the parish to hold executive office. Brendan is couch to our first football team. In 1997, Maureen Bollard took over the Chair of the club for one year and spared no effort with her team. Maureen came from a great football background. Her father, Rupert Newcomen, played for St. Maurs and her uncles, Pat and Jackser, were voted players of their time. Jackser captained the 1951 Junior Championship winning team. Séamus Carton, a native of Lusk, took over the chair in 1998. He had been a noted hurler and goalkeeper of the 1972 and 1973 team, and a former Inter-County referee. He was soft-spoken and things were done without a fuss. Séamus died during his term of office, which shook the club.

John Keely was elected chairman in 1998 for a three-year term, and showed boundless energy and enthusiasm. During his term of office, the club lounge was refurbished and a new development plan launched. The 1999–2000 season saw the club enter a Junior hurling team for the first time in the Dublin Adult League, and 2001 saw the club win the County Dublin Junior C Division 3 hurling title. St. Maurs, like many other clubs, have family names associated with it from its founding. These names include Bollard, McGuinness, Price, Rennicks, Kelly, Devine, Weldon, Butterly, Farren, Walsh, Wilde, Ferguson, Newcomen, Leonard, Bissett, Flynn, Monks, Sweetman, Carrick and Clerkin. These names are as synonymous with St. Maurs as O'Sullivan or Spillane with Kerry, Murphy or MacCarthy with Cork, Loftus or Flanagan with Mayo, Stockwell or Purcell with Galway, O'Neill or Jones with Tyrone.

== Achievements ==
- Dublin Junior Football Championship Winners 1951, 1972
- Dublin Intermediate Football Championship Winners 1973, 2003
- Dublin Senior Football League Division 2 Winners 2011
- Dublin AFL Div. 10 Winners 2012
- Dublin Junior Hurling Championship Winners 2018
- Dublin Junior B Hurling Championship Winners 2017
- Dublin Junior C Hurling Championship Winners 2001, 2011
- Dublin Under 21 C Hurling Championship Winner 2016
- Dublin Minor C Football Championship Winners 2006

== Current Football panel ==
- Ciaran Archer
- Conor McGuire
- Jack Burke
- Cian Rock

Current Hurling Panel

- Eoghan Conroy
- JM Sheridan
- Paddy Sheridan

=== Ladies' footballers ===
- Olivia Leonard
