= Whitehall Colmcille GAA =

Sports club in County Dublin, Ireland

Whitehall Colmcille
- Fionnbhrú Colmcille
- Founded: 1954
- County: Dublin
- Nickname: The Badgers
- Colours: Red & White
- Grounds: Collins Avenue Pitches (Highfield), Cloghran, ellenfield, Belcamp, St. Aidans Back Pitch
- Coordinates: 53°24′47.48″N 6°14′27.76″W

Playing kits
Standard colours

Whitehall Colmcille (Irish: Fionnbhrú Colmcille ) is a Gaelic Athletic Association club based on Collins' Avenue in Dublin 9, Ireland. The Club has contributed in a big way to the success of various County Football teams and All Ireland titles producing many well known names.

== History ==
Whitehall Gaels took over the lease Thorndale Tennis Club had with Dublin Corporation on Collins Avenue in 1966. Whitehall Gaels merged with Cumann Barra Colmcille in 1973. The club has won both hurling and football championships since then.

The club has a members bar (opened 1978), sports hall (built 1986) and ancillary rooms. The club purchased land in Cloghran in 1988 and built dressing rooms on the site in 1997, an all weather training pitch in 2002 and weights room in 2004.

In December 2010, the club applied to Dublin City Council for planning permission for a playing pitch and clubhouse on land opposite the Whitehall cinema on Collins Avenue, Dublin.

== Achievements ==
- Dublin Senior Football Championship: Senior 2 Winners 2024
- Dublin Junior Football Championship Winners 1966
- Dublin Junior B Football Championship: Winners 2017
- Dublin Under 21 Football Championship: Winners 1985, 1986, 1987, 2025
- Dublin Minor A Football Championship Winners (2) 1984, 2018
- Dublin Senior Football League Division 1 Winners 1993
- Dublin Senior Football League Division 2 Winners 2023
- Dublin Senior Hurling Championship: Senior 2 Winners 2022
- Dublin Intermediate Hurling Championship: Winners 1967, 1971 (both as Colmcille)
- Dublin Junior Hurling Championship: Winners 1966 (as Colmcille)
- Dublin Junior C Hurling Championship Winners 2022
- Dublin Junior D Hurling Championship Winners 2014
- Dublin Junior E Hurling Championship Winners 2008
- Dublin Junior F Hurling Championship Winners 2022
- Dublin Under 21 B Hurling Championship Winners 2014, 2017
- Dublin Minor D Hurling Championship Winners 2008

== Notable players ==
- Cormac Costello - Seven-time All Ireland winning Dublin senior footballer
- Eoghan O'Donnell - Dublin senior hurler and club footballer
- Tommy Drumm - Former Dublin All Ireland Winning Football Captain and GAA Texaco Footballer of the Year 1983
- Paul Clarke - Former Dublin All-Ireland Winning Footballer, All-Star Winner and Dublin Assistant Manager
- Paddy Moran - Former Dublin All-Ireland Winning Footballer
- Lee Gannon - Dublin Senior Footballer
