= Castleknock GAA =

Gaelic Athletic Association club in Ireland

Castleknock Hurling and Football Club
- Cumann Báire agus Peile Chaisleán Cnucha
- Founded: 1998
- County: Dublin
- Colours: Blue and Yellow
- Grounds: Somerton, Tir na nÓg
- Coordinates: 53°22′24.95″N 6°24′31.98″W

Playing kits
Standard colours

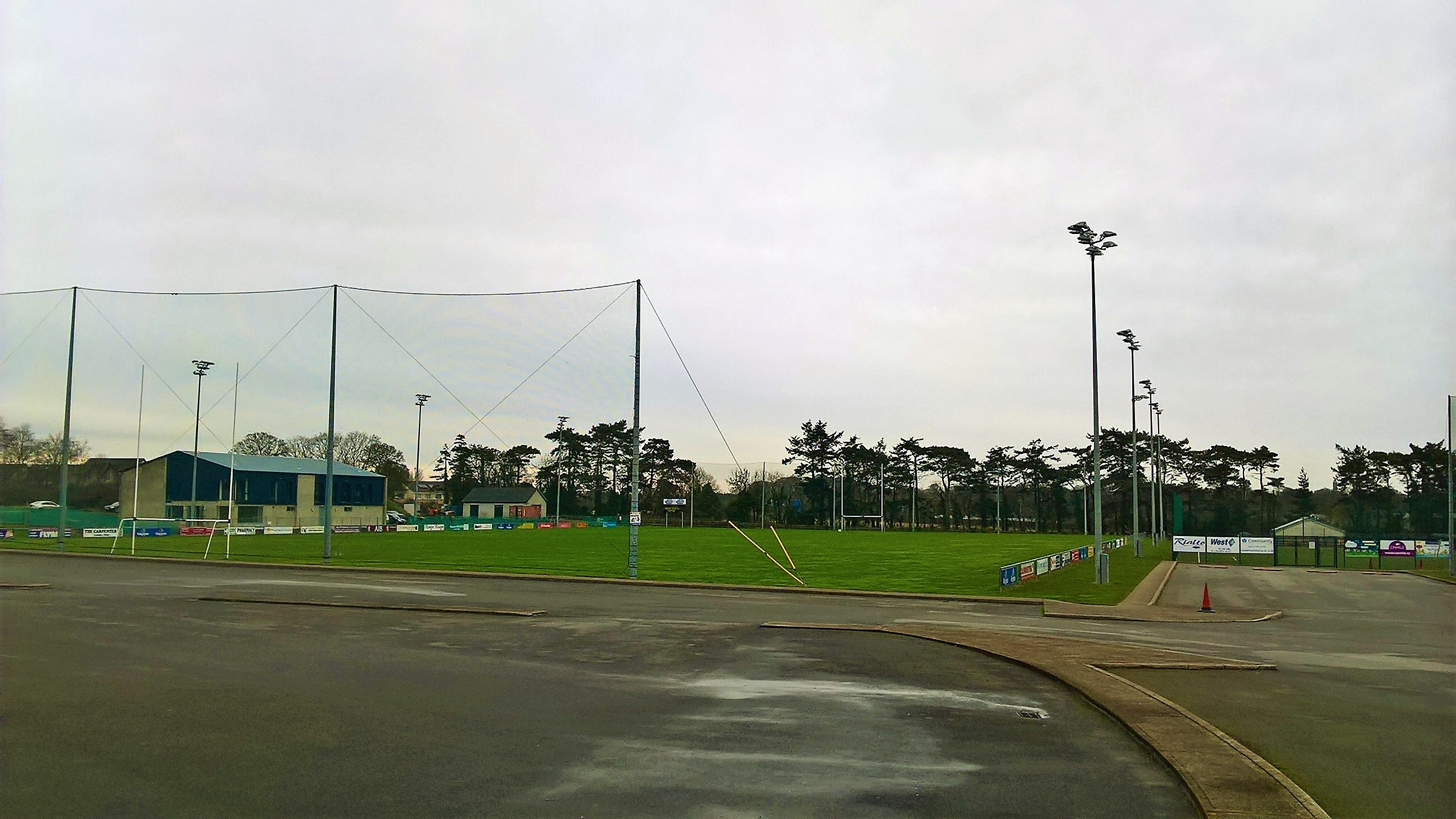
Somerton Park

Castleknock Hurling and Football Club is a Dublin GAA club centered on the townlands of Carpenterstown and Diswellstown in the civil parish of Castleknock in Fingal, Ireland. It serves large parts of the suburban areas of Castleknock, Hartstown, Coolmine, Blanchardstown, Laurel Lodge and Clonsilla. The club plays the following Gaelic games at all age levels from nursery to adult: Hurling, Gaelic football, Camogie and Ladies' Gaelic football.

It has a rivalry with the St Brigid's club.

== Grounds ==
The club's main grounds are located at Somerton Lane, Diswellstown. It also uses grounds managed by Fingal County Council at Porterstown, St.Catherine's Park and "Tir na nÓg" (beside Castleknock Community College).

== History ==
The club's first major discovery was a then five-year-old Ciarán Kilkenny, whom it invited to participate in its "Tir na nÓg" sessions in 1998.

The club began life in the tenth tier of the Dublin Senior Football Championship, later rising to the top tier.

The club won the National Féile in 2007 and recently 2016 and 2017.

The club has teams from the juvenile to senior levels. It has 1500 members from 650 different families.

A clubhouse worth about €1.5 million was about to be opened in 2019, as Kilkenny was winning All-Ireland titles around him. The man who opened it, Leo Varadkar, was Taoiseach and had nephews playing for the club at the time.

Lar Norton is the coach of the Castleknock senior footballers. Maria Bergin from Naas is the club's full-time "games promotion officer", paid by the Dublin County Board to visit local schools and inculcate the children she finds there into football and hurling. She runs a nursery for four to seven year-olds each Saturday morning in Carpenterstown to the west of Castleknock.

== Honours ==
- Dublin Senior Football Championship Runners up 2016
- Leinster Junior Club Football Championship Winners 2012
- Dublin Junior Football Championship Winners 2012
- Dublin Junior Hurling Championship Winners 2013
- Leinster Special Junior Hurling Championship Winners (1) 2013
- Dublin Intermediate Football Championship Winners 2014
- Dublin Intermediate Hurling Championship Winners 2015
- Dublin Under 21 C Football Championship Winners 2011
- Feile Division 1 Football All Ireland Championship Winners 2016
- Feile Division 1 Hurling All Ireland Championship Winners 2007
- Dublin Minor A Football Championship Winners 2011, 2019
- Dublin Senior Football League Division 2 Winners 2015
- Dublin AFL Div. 4 Winners 2012
- Dublin AFL Div. 5 Winners 2011
- Dublin AFL Div. 10 Winners 2015
- Dublin Junior F Hurling Championship Winners 2010
- Dublin Junior B Hurling Championship Winners 2006
- Dublin Junior B+ Hurling Championship Winners 2004
- Dublin Junior D Hurling Championship Winners 2003
- Dublin Minor B Hurling Championship Winners 2009
- Dublin Minor C Hurling Championship Winners 2017
- Dublin Minor D Hurling Championship Winners 2012
