= Naomh Barróg CLG =

Gaelic games club in County Dublin, Ireland

Naomh Barróg
- Naomh Barróg
- Founded: 1974
- County: Dublin
- Nickname: Barróg
- Colours: Green, Red
- Grounds: Páirc Barróg
- Coordinates: 53°23′23.13″N 6°09′04.83″W

Playing kits
Standard colours

Senior Club Championships
	All Ireland	Leinster champions	Dublin champions
Football:	0	0	0

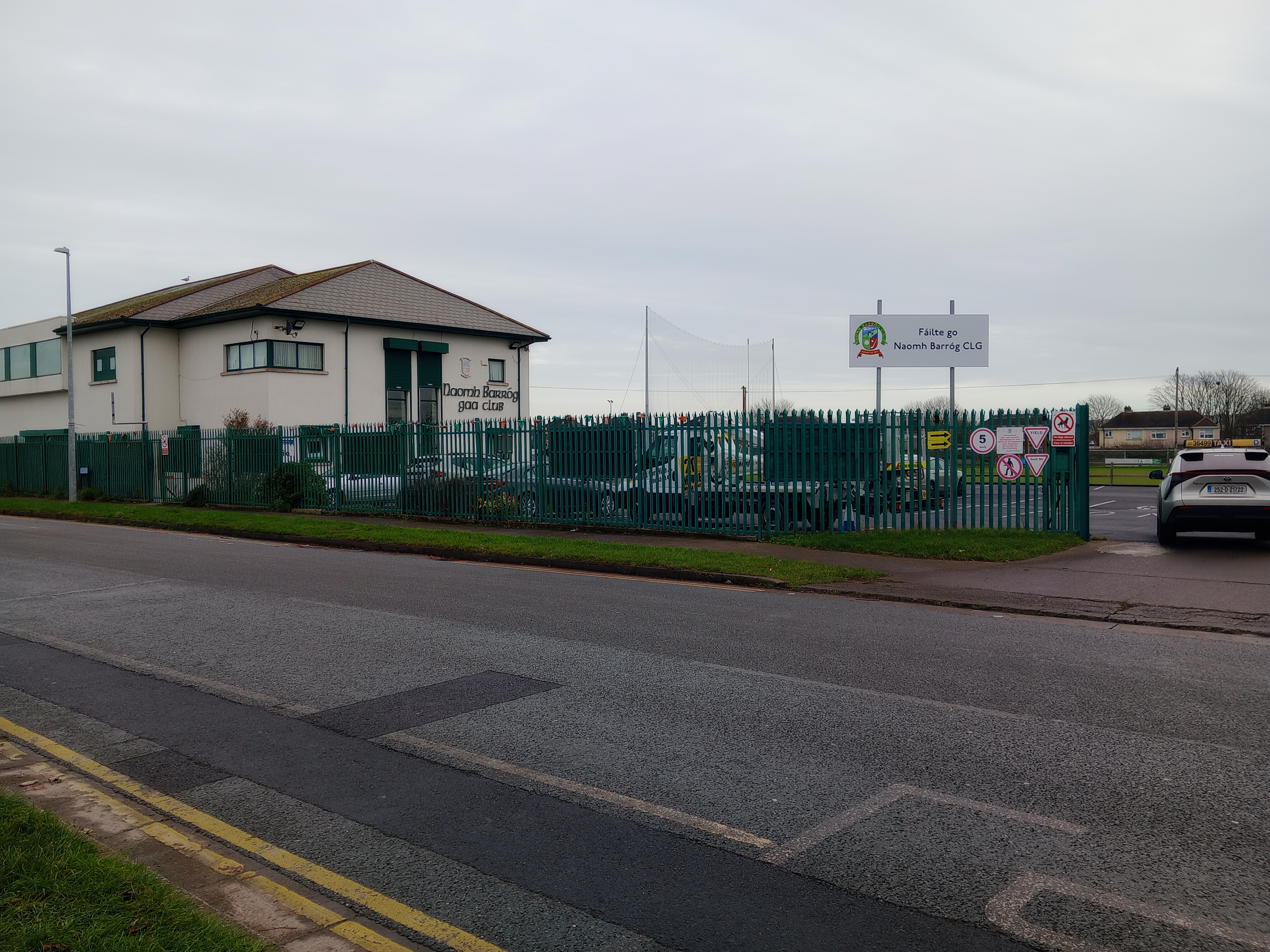
Naomh Barróg CLG clubhouse, welcome sign and pitch in typical Irish weather

Naomh Barróg is a Dublin based Gaelic Athletic Association club.

== History ==
Gaelic games were introduced to the parish of Kilbarrack-Foxfield through the Scoil Lorcáin school, which had successes in Cumann na mBunscol competitions in 1972, 1973, and 1974.

Following the interest created by these titles, it was decided to form a local GAA club. At a meeting attended by eight people in Scoil Lorcain on 5 September 1974, Naomh Barróg GAA club was formed. The club was named after the 6th-century founder of a church in Kilbarrack, the remains of which still survive in Kilbarrack graveyard.

In the club's first year, four teams were entered in North Dublin GAA competitions. The club fields football teams at all levels from U9 to Senior, hurling from U9 to Junior, and Ladies football from U10 to Junior.

The club has won two national Féile na nGael titles and has won a title at every football level from U10 to Intermediate.

The club's main ground, Pairc Barróg, was acquired in 1982. It was developed and officially opened in September 1984. During its history, Naomh Barróg has expanded to include membership from the neighboring areas of Bayside, Baldoyle, Sutton Park, Donaghmede and Grange-Woodbine. Naomh Barróg's opened a new clubhouse in July 2001.

Naomh Barróg currently have Senior Hurling status and play in Dublin Senior Hurling League Division 1. Naomh Barróg footballers currently have Intermediate status and compete in AFL Division 2.

== Honours ==
- Dublin Senior 2 Hurling: 2022
- Dublin Intermediate Football: 2022
- Dublin AHL Division 2 (2): 2019, 2024
- Dublin Junior Football Championship: 1981
- Dublin AFL Division 3: 2019
- Dublin Junior B Hurling Championship: 2004
- Leinster Special Junior Hurling Championship (1): 2008
- Dublin Minor B Hurling Championship (2): 2006, 2022
- Dublin Minor C Hurling Championship: 2005
