= Philly McMahon =

Irish Gaelic footballer (born 1987)

Personal information
- Native name: Pilib Mac Mathúna (Irish)
- Born: 5 September 1987 (age 39) Dublin, Ireland
- Occupation: Strength and conditioning coach
- Height: 1.83 m (6 ft 0 in)

Sport
- Sport: Gaelic football
- Position: Left corner-back
Club
- Years: Club
- Ballymun Kickhams
Club titles
- Dublin titles: 2
- Leinster titles: 1
- All-Ireland Titles: 0
College
- Years: College
- DCU
College titles
- Sigerson titles: 2
Inter-county
Years	County	Apps (scores)
2008–2021	Dublin	25 (1–8)
Inter-county titles
- Leinster titles: 12
- All-Irelands: 8
- NFL: 5
- All Stars: 2

Philip "Philly" McMahon (born 5 September 1987) is a Gaelic footballer who plays for the Ballymun Kickhams club and, previously, for the Dublin county team.

Since retiring from inter-county football in 2021, McMahon has written for the Irish Independent and provided commentary for the BBC.

== Playing career ==
=== Club ===
McMahon is a member of the Ballymun Kickhams senior football team. In 2013, Ballymun reached the 2012–13 All-Ireland Senior Club Football Championship final. McMahon scored a goal as Ballymun were defeated by Roscommon GAA club St Brigid's by a single point, on a scoreline of 2–11 to 2–10.

=== Inter-county ===
McMahon won the 2008 O'Byrne Cup with Dublin, defeating Longford in the final. He made his championship debut that year as a substitute against Louth. He played Interprovincial Championship football for Leinster and won two Dublin Under 21 Football Championship titles with Ballymun. He was named on the 2010 GPA Gaelic Team of the Year. He replaced James McCarthy as a substitute in the second half of the 2011 All-Ireland Senior Football Championship final, a game which Dublin won by 1–12 to 1–11 against Kerry.

On 22 September 2013, McMahon made his first start of the championship in the All-Ireland SFC final. He was a key performer as Dublin defeated Mayo by a scoreline of 2–12 to 1–14.

McMahon helped Dublin to win the 2015 All-Ireland SFC final. Throughout the season he became a strong attacking threat despite being named at left corner-back. He scored 1–2 in the replayed semi final against Mayo, notably holding Aidan O'Shea to a single point over both games. McMahon was a key performer in the final where Dublin defeated reigning champions Kerry by a scoreline of 0–12 to 0–9, with McMahon scoring a point in the first half while keeping marker Colm Cooper scoreless. McMahon received his first All Star Award, while he was also named on the shortlist for GAA Footballer of the Year, ultimately won by teammate Jack McCaffrey.

McMahon was again a key performer as Dublin again defeated Mayo after a replay in the 2016 All-Ireland SFC final by a single point and a scoreline of 1–15 to 1–14 to retain the Sam Maguire Cup. McMahon received his second All Star for his performances.

In 2017, Kerry narrowly defeated Dublin in the National League final by a single point. Dublin then went on to win a record seventh consecutive Leinster SFC titles. On 17 September, McMahon was heavily involved as Dublin claimed an historic third consecutive All-Ireland SFC titles, with another narrow 1–17 to 1–16 victory against Mayo in the 2017 All-Ireland SFC final. Having been outplayed in the first half, Dublin turned the game around to win courtesy of a 75th minute Dean Rock free.

McMahon announced his retirement from inter-county football on 17 December 2021.

=== International rules ===
McMahon made his debut in the 2015 International Rules Series. Ireland edged out the single game series against a strong Australia side on a scoreline of 56–52.

== Other work ==
McMahon writes regularly for the Irish Independent. He has provided television commentary for the BBC.

McMahon set up a charity called Half Time Talk, which aims to motivate young adults with social problems. He has been involved with charity fundraising, such as the Focus Ireland "Shine A Light Night" to raise money for homeless families.

He is a business owner and operates multiple gyms. He also launched a health food company.

In November 2012, McMahon was the strength and conditioning coach at Shamrock Rovers. In May 2021, McMahon began working with the Bohemians club's first team as a performance coach.

In 2024, he was approached by the Derry County Board to replace Mickey Harte as manager of the senior team; he declined.

== Personal life ==
McMahon changed his surname from Caffrey, his mother's name, to McMahon, his father's name, whom he was named after. His father died from cancer at the age of 64 in 2018. McMahon's brother died in 2012 from a drug overdose, and McMahon has spoken about the effects of drugs in his community. He has spoken in support of safe injection centres, and criticised Fine Gael TD Paul Kehoe in 2022 for his usage of the term "druggies".

McMahon has spoken openly about having had a hair transplantation. He is a saxophonist.

In 2017, after winning his fifth All-Ireland Senior Championship, McMahon released his autobiography called The Choice, which was co-written by sports journalist Niall Kelly. The book won the 2017 Eir Sports Book of the Year award in December 2017. The book also won the Sports Book of the Year award at the 2017 Irish Book Awards.

He married his long-term girlfriend Sarah Lacey in December 2019.

== Honours ==
=== Team ===
==== Dublin ====
- All-Ireland Senior Football Championship (8): 2011, 2013, 2015, 2016, 2017, 2018, 2019, 2020
- Leinster Senior Football Championship (12): 2009, 2011, 2012, 2013, 2014, 2015, 2016, 2017, 2018, 2019, 2020, 2021
- National Football League (5): 2013, 2014, 2015, 2016, 2018
- O'Byrne Cup (1): 2008

==== Ballymun Kickhams ====
- Leinster Senior Club Football Championship (1): 2012-13
- Dublin Senior Football Championship (2): 2012, 2020

==== Ireland ====
- International Rules Series (1): 2015

==== DCU ====
- Sigerson Cup (2): 2010, 2012

=== Individual ===
- All Star Awards (2): 2015, 2016
