= 2017 Leinster Senior Football Championship =

2017 Leinster SFC
Tournament details
- Year: 2017

Winners
- Champions: Dublin (56th win)
- Manager: Jim Gavin
- Captain: Stephen Cluxton

Runners-up
- Runners-up: Kildare
- Manager: Cian O'Neill
- Captain: Eoin Doyle

The 2017 Leinster Senior Football Championship was the 2017 installment of the annual Leinster Senior Football Championship organised by Leinster GAA.

Dublin were the defending champions, having won their 55th title and completed a 6-in-a-row in 2016. The draw for the championship was made on 13 October 2016.

== Teams ==
The Leinster championship was contested by 11 of the 12 county teams in Leinster, a province of Ireland. Kilkenny was the only county team not to compete.

| Team | Colours | Sponsor | Manager | Captain | Most recent success |
| Team | Colours | Sponsor | Manager | Captain | All-Ireland | Provincial |
|---|---|---|---|---|---|---|
| Carlow | Red, green and gold | Tickets.ie | Turlough O'Brien | Darragh Foley | | 1944 |
| Dublin | Sky blue and navy | American International Group | Jim Gavin | Stephen Cluxton | 2016 | 2016 |
| Kildare | White | Brady Family Ham | Cian O'Neill | Eoin Doyle | 1928 | 2000 |
| Laois | Blue and white | MW Hire Services | Peter Creedon | Stephen Attride | | 2003 |
| Longford | Royal blue and gold | Glennon Brothers | Denis Connerton | Mickey Quinn | | 1968 |
| Louth | Red and white | Morgan Fuels | Colin Kelly | Pádraig Rath | 1957 | 1957 |
| Meath | Green and gold | Devenish Beyond Nutrition | Andy McEntee | Donal Keogan | 1999 | 2010 |
| Offaly | White, green and gold | Carroll's Cuisine | Pat Flanagan | Alan Mulhall | 1982 | 1997 |
| Westmeath | Maroon and white | Renault | Tom Cribbin | Ger Egan | | 2004 |
| Wexford | Purple and gold | Gain Feeds | Séamus McEnaney | Graeme Molloy | 1918 | 1945 |
| Wicklow | Blue and gold | Arklow Bay Hotel | Johnny Magee | Rory Finn |

== Draw ==
The four teams who won the quarter-finals in the previous year were given byes to this year's quarter-finals.

Preliminary round
Louth | 1-19
Wicklow | 1-14
Laois | 4-15
Longford | 0-16
Carlow | 2-17
Wexford | 2-13

Quarter-finals
Meath | 0-27
Louth | 3-9
Kildare | 1-21
Laois | 1-7
Dublin | 0-19
Carlow | 0-7
Westmeath | 0-10; 3-17 (R)
Offaly | 0-10; 0-15 (R)

Semi-finals
Meath | 0-13
Kildare | 2-16
Dublin | 4-29
Westmeath | 0-10

Final
Kildare | 1-17
Dublin | 2-23

=== Preliminary round ===
21 May 2017
15:00
Preliminary round

| Louth | 1-19 - 1-14 | Wicklow |
|---|---|---|
| Ryan Burns 0-6 (0-4f, 0-1 ’45), Eoin O’Connor 1-2, Padraic Smith, Jim McEneaney, Declan Byrne 0-2 each, Padraig Rath, Conal McKeever, Bevan Duffy, Ruairi Moore, Gerard McSorley 0-1 each | Report | Mark Kenny 1-1, Seanie Furlong 0-4 (0-3f), Paul Cunningham 0-3 (0-1f), Robert Lambert (0-1f), Daren Hayden, David Boothman, Dean Healy, Conor Ffrench, John McGrath 0-1 each |

Parnell Park
Attendance: 4,000
Referee: Niall Cullen (Fermanagh)
21 May 2017
15:00
Preliminary round

| Laois | 4-15 - 0-16 | Longford |
|---|---|---|
| Paul Kingston 2-1, Donie Kingston 1-4 (0-3f), Alan Farrell 1-0, John O’Loughlin 0-3, Padraig McMahon, Darren Strong, Eoin Buggie, Brendan Quigley, Colm Begley, Evan O'Carroll, Niall Donoher 0-1 each | Report | Robbie Smyth 0-11 (0-6f), Ronan McEntire, Sean McCormack, Liam Connerton, Darren Gallagher, Conor Berry 0-1 each |

O'Moore Park, Portlaoise
Attendance: 3,500
Referee: Anthony Nolan (Wicklow)
21 May 2017
15:00
Preliminary Round

| Carlow | 2-17 - 2-13 | Wexford |
|---|---|---|
| Paul Broderick 0-10 (0-5f), Brendan Murphy 1-2, Danny Moran 1-0, Darragh Foley 0-2, Gary Kelly, Alan Kelly, Sean Gannon 0-1 each | Report | Ben Brosnan (0-5f) and Ciarán Lyng (0-5f) 0-5 each, PJ Banville 1-1, Naomhan Rossiter 1-0, Michael Furlong and Adrian Flynn 0-1 each |

Dr Cullen Park
Attendance: 3,044
Referee: Fergal Kelly (Longford)

=== Quarter-finals ===
| 3 June 2017; 19:00; Quarter-final | Dublin | 0-19 - 0-7 | Carlow | O'Moore Park, Portlaoise; Attendance: 13,238; Referee: Sean Hurson (Tyrone); Man of the Match: Sean Murphy (Fenagh) |
| 3 June 2017; 19:00; Quarter-final | Dean Rock 0-6f, Ciaran Kilkenny 0-3, Jack McCaffrey, Con O’Callaghan (0-2f), Bernard Brogan 0-2 each, Niall Scully, Paul Mannion, Diarmuid Conolly (1 '45), Conor McHugh 0-1 each | Report | Paul Broderick 0-3f, Danny Moran, Brendan Murphy, Sean Murphy, Darragh Foley (0-1f) 0-1 each | O'Moore Park, Portlaoise; Attendance: 13,238; Referee: Sean Hurson (Tyrone); Man of the Match: Sean Murphy (Fenagh) |

| 4 June 2017; 15:00; Quarter-final | Meath | 0-27 - 3-9 | Louth | Parnell Park; Referee: Barry Cassidy (Derry); Man of the Match: Graham Reilly (St Colmcille's) |
| 4 June 2017; 15:00; Quarter-final | Graham Reilly 0-7, Donal Lenihan 0-6 (0-2f, 1 '45), James Toher 0-5 (0-3f), Bryan McMahon, Ruairí Ó Coileáin, Thomas Reilly 0-2 each, Ronan Jones, Cillian O'Sullivan, Sean Tobin 0-1 each | Report | Jim McEneaney 1-2 (1-0 pen), Conal McKeever and Ronan Holcroft 1-0 each, James Califf 0-3 (0-1f), Ryan Burns 0-2f, Anthony Williams and Bevan Duffy 0-1 each | Parnell Park; Referee: Barry Cassidy (Derry); Man of the Match: Graham Reilly (St Colmcille's) |

| 4 June 2017; 15:00; Quarter-final | Kildare | 1-21 - 1-7 | Laois | O'Connor Park; Attendance: 7,477; Referee: David Coldrick (Meath); Man of the Match: Keith Cribbin (Johnstownbridge) |
| 4 June 2017; 15:00; Quarter-final | Daniel Flynn 1-3, Niall Kelly and Cathal McNally 0-3 each, Kevin Feely (0-2f) and Paul Cribbin 0-2 each, Mark Donnellan (1 '45), Ollie Lyons, Johnny Byrne, Keith Cribbin, Tommy Moolick, David Slattery, Eamonn Callaghan, Fionn Dowling 0-1 each | Report | Donal Kingston 1-2 (0-2f), Gary Walsh 0-3 (1 '45), Alan Farrell and Evan O'Carroll (0-1f) 0-1 each | O'Connor Park; Attendance: 7,477; Referee: David Coldrick (Meath); Man of the Match: Keith Cribbin (Johnstownbridge) |

| 11 June 2017; 15:00; Quarter-final | Offaly | 0-10 - 0-10 | Westmeath | O'Connor Park; Attendance: 8,723; Referee: Padraig O'Sullivan (Kerry); Man of the Match: Ger Egan (Tyrrellspass) |
| 11 June 2017; 15:00; Quarter-final | Nigel Dunne 0-3 (0-1f), Graham Guilfoyle and Michael Brazil 0-2 each, Niall Darby, Johnny Moloney, Niall McNamee 0-1 each | Report | Ger Egan and John Heslin (0-3f) 0-4 each, Noel Mulligan and Shane Dempsey 0-1 each | O'Connor Park; Attendance: 8,723; Referee: Padraig O'Sullivan (Kerry); Man of the Match: Ger Egan (Tyrrellspass) |

| 17 June 2017; 15:00; Quarter-final replay | Westmeath | 3-17 - 0-15 | Offaly | Cusack Park; Attendance: 4,714; Referee: Rory Hickey (Clare); Man of the Match: John Heslin (St Loman's) |
| 17 June 2017; 15:00; Quarter-final replay | John Heslin 1-6 (0-2f), Kieran Martin 1-2, Paul Sharry 0-3 (2 '45), John Egan 1-0, Frank Boyle 0-2, Ger Egan, Callum McCormack, Tommy McDaniel, Noel Mulligan 0-1 each | Report | Nigel Dunne 0-5 (0-3f), Peter Cunningham 0-4, Sean Doyle 0-2, Niall Darby, Conor McNamee, Michael Brazil, Graham Guilfoyle 0-1 each. | Cusack Park; Attendance: 4,714; Referee: Rory Hickey (Clare); Man of the Match: John Heslin (St Loman's) |

=== Semi-finals ===
| 17 June 2017; 7:00 pm Semi-final | Meath | 0-13 - 2-16 | Kildare | O'Connor Park; Attendance: 12,702; Referee: Joe McQuillan (Cavan); Man of the Match: Daniel Flynn (Johnstownbridge) |
| 17 June 2017; 7:00 pm Semi-final | Donal Lenihan 0-5 (0-2f), Ruairi O’Coileain 0-3, Bryan Menton 0-2, Mickey Burke, James McEntee, James Toher 0-1 each | Report | Daniel Flynn 1-4, Cathal McNally 1-3, Kevin Feely 0-5 (0-4f), Paddy Brophy 0-2, Eamonn Callaghan and Neil Flynn (0-1f) 0-1 each | O'Connor Park; Attendance: 12,702; Referee: Joe McQuillan (Cavan); Man of the Match: Daniel Flynn (Johnstownbridge) |

| 25 June 2017; 4:00 pm Semi-final | Dublin | 4-29 - 0-10 | Westmeath | Croke Park; Attendance: 33,370; Referee: Conor Lane (Cork); Man of the Match: Paul Mannion (Kilmacud Crokes) |
| 25 June 2017; 4:00 pm Semi-final | Dean Rock 1-5 (0-3f, 2 '45), Paul Mannion 0-8, Ciarán Kilkenny 1-3, Kevin McManamon 1-1, Con O'Callaghan 0-3, Eoghan O’Gara 1-0, Brian Fenton, Paddy Andrews, Bernard Brogan (0-1f), Shane B. Carthy 0-2 each, Jack McCaffrey 0-1. | Report | John Heslin 0-4 (0-3f), Kieran Martin 0-3, John Egan 0-2, Ger Egan 0-1 | Croke Park; Attendance: 33,370; Referee: Conor Lane (Cork); Man of the Match: Paul Mannion (Kilmacud Crokes) |

=== Final ===
| 16 July 2017; 4:00 pm Final | Dublin | 2-23 - 1-17 | Kildare | Croke Park; Attendance: 66,734; Referee: Anthony Nolan (Wicklow); Man of the Match: Con O'Callaghan (Cuala) |
| 16 July 2017; 4:00 pm Final | Con O'Callaghan 0-12 (0-6f), Bernard Brogan 0-5, James McCarthy and Dean Rock 1-0 each, Ciarán Kilkenny 0-2, Paul Mannion, Paddy Andrews, Shane B. Carthy, Brian Howard 0-1 each | Report | Paddy Brophy 1-3 (0-1f), Kevin Feely 0-5 (0-4f), Daniel Flynn and Cathal McNally 0-2 each, Johnny Byrne, Keith Cribbin, Niall Kelly, David Slattery, Fionn Dowling 0-1 each | Croke Park; Attendance: 66,734; Referee: Anthony Nolan (Wicklow); Man of the Match: Con O'Callaghan (Cuala) |

== See also ==
- 2017 All-Ireland Senior Football Championship
  - 2017 Connacht Senior Football Championship
  - 2017 Munster Senior Football Championship
  - 2017 Ulster Senior Football Championship
