= Niall Carew =

Irish Gaelic footballer and hurler

Personal information
- Native name: Niall Carrún (Irish)
- Born: 1973 or 1974 (age 52–53) Staplestown, County Kildare, Ireland

Sport
- Sport: Gaelic football
Inter-county management
- Years: Team
- 2007–2012? 2012–2014 2014–2017 2020–2024: Kildare (selector); Waterford; Sligo; Carlow

Niall Carew (born 1974) is an Irish Gaelic football selector, manager and former Gaelic footballer won a Leinster minor football medal in 1991 and played with Kildare hurlers for a number of years .hurler

Carew has managed three inter-county football teams: Waterford, Sligo and Carlow.

== Career ==
Born in Staplestown, County Kildare, Carew played Gaelic football for the St Kevin's club and hurling for Coill Dubh. Six senior hurling championship medals .

He played until he was 27 years of age.

In retirement from playing, Carew became involved in team management. At inter-county level he served as a selector with the senior Kildare county team. He was five seasons a selector with Kildare when Kieran McGeeney was manager, beginning from McGeeney's appointment to that role in 2007.

A former selector by 2012, Carew was appointed to manage the Waterford county team in November of that year. He was appointed manager of the Sligo county team in 2014.

As of 2015, he was managing Ballylinan GAA in south Laois.

In August 2020, Carlow announced him as their successor to Turlough O'Brien.

Carew spent until 2024 as Carlow manager. After four and half seasons in charge, Carew left in June 2024, informing Carlow's footballers directly after their exit from the 2024 Tailteann Cup. According to Frank Roche, writing in the Irish Independent in 2024, "few current managers will replicate" the five championships which Carew amassed with Carlow.

As of 2024, Carew had been working with St John of God for more than two and a half decades. Working from 8:30 until 4:30, he spent an additional five or six hours of each day working when he was involved with an inter-county team.

== Personal life ==
Carew is married to Michelle. Her illness in late 2023, for which she received chemotherapy, led to Carew leaving the Carlow managerial post in 2024.

Sporting positions
Preceded by John Owens	Waterford Senior Football Manager; 2012–2014	Succeeded by Tom McGlinchey
Preceded by Pat Flanagan	Sligo Senior Football Manager; 2014–2017	Succeeded by Cathal Corey
Preceded by Pat Flanagan	Sligo Under-21 Football Manager; 2014–?	Succeeded by ?
Preceded by Turlough O'Brien	Carlow Senior Football Manager; 2020–2024	Succeeded by Shane Curran
