= 2015 Leinster Senior Football Championship =

2015 Leinster SFC
Tournament details
- Year: 2015

Winners
- Champions: Dublin (54th win)
- Manager: Jim Gavin
- Captain: Stephen Cluxton

Runners-up
- Runners-up: Westmeath
- Manager: Tom Cribbin
- Captain: Ger Egan

The 2015 Leinster Senior Football Championship is the 2015 installment of the annual Leinster Senior Football Championship held under the auspices of Leinster GAA. The competition was scheduled to start on 16 May 2015 with Offaly drawn against Longford in the opening game. The final took place 12 July. Dublin won their tenth Leinster title in 11 years after a 2-13 to 0-6 win against Westmeath.

== Teams ==
The Leinster championship was contested by 11 of the 12 county teams in Leinster, a province of Ireland. Kilkenny was the only county team not to compete.

Team	Colours	Sponsor	Manager	Captain	Most recent success
Team	Colours	Sponsor	Manager	Captain	All-Ireland	Provincial
Carlow	Red, green and gold	Tickets.ie	Turlough O'Brien	Brendan Kavanagh		1944
Dublin	Sky blue and navy	American International Group	Jim Gavin	Stephen Cluxton	2013	2014
Kildare	White	Brady Family Ham	Jason Ryan	Eamonn Callaghan	1928	2000
Laois	Blue and white	MW Hire Services	Tomás Ó Flatharta	Ross Munnelly		2003
Longford	Royal blue and gold	Glennon Brothers	Jack Sheedy	Dermot Brady		1968
Louth	Red and white	Morgan Fuels	Colin Kelly	Paddy Keenan	1957	1957
Meath	Green and gold	Tayto Park	Mick O'Dowd	Kevin Reilly	1999	2010
Offaly	White, green and gold	Carroll Cuisine	Pat Flanagan	Niall McNamee	1982	1997
Westmeath	Maroon and white	Renault	Tom Cribbin	Ger Egan		2004
Wexford	Purple and gold	Gain Feeds	David Power	Graeme Molloy	1918	1945
Wicklow	Blue and gold	Arklow Bay Hotel	Johnny Magee	Leighton Glynn

Preliminary round
Offaly	0-13
Longford	0-16
Laois	3-16
Carlow	0-08
Louth	0-16
Westmeath	3-14

Quarter-finals
Longford	0-10
Dublin	4-25
Laois	0-16 1-11
Kildare	0-16 3-18
Westmeath	1-21
Wexford	0-15
Wicklow	3-12
Meath	2-19

Semi-finals
Dublin	5-18
Kildare	0-14
Westmeath	3-19
Meath	2-18

Final
Dublin	2-13
Westmeath	0-06

=== Preliminary Round ===
16 May 2015; Preliminary Round	Offaly	0-13 – 0-16	Longford	O'Connor Park, Tullamore
16 May 2015; Preliminary Round		Report		O'Connor Park, Tullamore

16 May 2015; Preliminary Round	Laois	3-16 – 0-8	Carlow	Dr Cullen Park, Carlow
16 May 2015; Preliminary Round		Report		Dr Cullen Park, Carlow

17 May 2015; Preliminary Round	Louth	0-16 – 3-14	Westmeath	Drogheda
17 May 2015; Preliminary Round		Report		Drogheda

=== Quarter Finals ===
31 May 2015; Quarter Final	Longford	0-10 – 4-25	Dublin	Croke Park, Dublin
31 May 2015; Quarter Final		Report		Croke Park, Dublin

6 June 2015; Quarter Final	Laois	0-16 – 0-16	Kildare	O'Connor Park, Tullamore
6 June 2015; Quarter Final		Report		O'Connor Park, Tullamore

14 June 2015; Quarter Final	Westmeath	1-21 – 0-15	Wexford	Cusack Park, Mullingar
14 June 2015; Quarter Final		Report		Cusack Park, Mullingar

14 June 2015; Quarter Final	Wicklow	3-12 – 2-19	Meath	Páirc Tailteann, Navan
14 June 2015; Quarter Final		Report		Páirc Tailteann, Navan

6 June 2015; Quarter Final Replay	Laois	1-11 – 3-18	Kildare	O'Connor Park, Tullamore
6 June 2015; Quarter Final Replay		Report		O'Connor Park, Tullamore

=== Semi-finals ===
28 June 2015; 2:00 pm Semi-final	Westmeath	3-19 – 2-18	Meath	Croke Park, Dublin; Attendance: 50,324; Referee: Conor Lane (Cork); Man of the Match: John Heslin
28 June 2015; 2:00 pm Semi-final	John Heslin 1-9 (0-5f), Kieran Martin 2-3, Paul Sharry (2 '45), Shane Dempsey, John Connellan 0-2 each, Ray Connellan 0-1	Report	Brian McMahon 2-2, Graham Reilly and Eamon Wallace 0-4 each, Stephen Bray 0-3, Andrew Tormey (0-2f) and Michael Newman (0-1f) 0-2 each, Bryan Menton 0-1	Croke Park, Dublin; Attendance: 50,324; Referee: Conor Lane (Cork); Man of the Match: John Heslin

28 June 2015; 4:00 pm Semi-final	Dublin	5-18 – 0-14	Kildare	Croke Park, Dublin; Attendance: 50,324; Referee: David Coldrick (Meath); Man of the Match: Diarmuid Connolly
28 June 2015; 4:00 pm Semi-final	Diarmuid Connolly (1-0 pen) and Bernard Brogan 2-3 each, Dean Rock 1-4 (0-4f), Ciarán Kilkenny 0-4, Alan Brogan 0-3, Philly McMahon 0-1	Report	Eoghan O'Flaherty 0-4 (0-2f), Padraig Fogarty 0-3, Padraig O'Neill 0-2, Emmet Bolton, Paul Cribbin, Cathal McNally, Alan Smith, Niall Kelly 0-1 each.	Croke Park, Dublin; Attendance: 50,324; Referee: David Coldrick (Meath); Man of the Match: Diarmuid Connolly

=== Final ===
12 July; 2:00 pm Final	Dublin	2-13 - 0-6	Westmeath	Croke Park; Attendance: 47,840; Referee: Joe McQuillan (Cavan); Man of the Match: Diarmuid Connolly
12 July; 2:00 pm Final	Bernard Brogan 1-1, Jack McCaffrey 1-0, Ciarán Kilkenny, Diarmuid Connolly 0-3 each, Dean Rock 0-2 (2f), Philip McMahon, James McCarthy, Michael Darragh Macauley, Alan Brogan 0-1 each.	Report	John Heslin 0-3 (2f), Kieran Martin 0-2, Francis Boyle 0-1	Croke Park; Attendance: 47,840; Referee: Joe McQuillan (Cavan); Man of the Match: Diarmuid Connolly

Preliminary round refs

Quarter-final refs

Semi-final refs

Final ref
