= 2017 All-Ireland Senior Football Championship =

Championship details
- Dates: 7 May – 17 September 2017
- Teams: 33

All-Ireland Champions
- Winning team: Dublin (27th win)
- Captain: Stephen Cluxton
- Manager: Jim Gavin

All-Ireland Finalists
- Losing team: Mayo
- Captain: Cillian O'Connor
- Manager: Stephen Rochford

Provincial Champions
- Munster: Kerry
- Leinster: Dublin
- Ulster: Tyrone
- Connacht: Roscommon

Championship statistics
- Top Scorer: Cillian O'Connor (3–66)
- Player of the Year: Andy Moran

The 2017 All-Ireland Senior Football Championship was the 131st edition of the GAA's premier inter-county Gaelic football tournament since its establishment in 1887.

Thirty-three teams took part – thirty-one of the thirty-two Counties of Ireland (Kilkenny, as in previous years, do not enter), London and New York.

Dublin won their third championship in a row, defeating Mayo in the final on 17 September 2017 by 1–17 to 1–16.

== Format ==
=== Provincial Championships format ===
Connacht, Leinster, Munster and Ulster each organise a provincial championship. All teams who lose a match in their provincial championship (with the exception of New York) enter the All-Ireland qualifiers. All provincial matches are knock-out.

=== Qualifiers format ===
Twenty eight of the twenty nine teams beaten in the provincial championships enter the All-Ireland qualifiers, which are knockout. Sixteen of the seventeen teams (New York do not enter the qualifiers) eliminated before their provincial semi-finals play eight matches in round 1, with the winners of these games playing the eight beaten provincial semi-finalists in round 2. The eight winning teams from round 2 play-off against each other in round 3, with the four winning teams facing the four beaten provincial finalists in round 4 to complete the double-elimination format. Further details of the format are included with each qualifier round listed below.

=== All-Ireland format ===
The four provincial champions play the four winners of round 4 of the qualifiers in the quarter-finals. Two semi-finals and a final follow. All matches are knock-out. If a game ends in a draw it is replayed. If a replay ends in a draw, two ten minute periods of extra time are played each way. If extra time ends in a draw, the match is replayed for a third time.

== Changes from 2016 ==
On 1 January 2017 the 'mark' was introduced. It is defined as –

When a player catches the ball cleanly from a kick-out without it touching the ground, on or past the 45 metre line nearest the kick out point, he shall be awarded a ‘mark’ by the referee. The player awarded a ‘mark’ shall have the options of (a) taking a free kick or (b) playing on immediately.

== Provincial championships ==
=== Leinster Senior Football Championship ===
The four teams who won the quarter-finals in the previous year are given byes to this year's quarter-finals.

Preliminary round
Louth | 1-19
Wicklow | 1-14
Laois | 4-15
Longford | 0-16
Carlow | 2-17
Wexford | 2-13

Quarter-finals
Meath | 0-27
Louth | 3-9
Kildare | 1-21
Laois | 1-7
Dublin | 0-19
Carlow | 0-7
Westmeath | 0-10; 3-17 (R)
Offaly | 0-10; 0-15 (R)

Semi-finals
Meath | 0-13
Kildare | 2-16
Dublin | 4-29
Westmeath | 0-10

Final
Kildare | 1-17
Dublin | 2-23

=== Munster Senior Football Championship ===
The two teams who won the semi-finals in the previous year are given byes to this year's semi-finals.

Quarter-finals
Limerick | 1-12
Clare | 1-13
Cork | 1-12
Waterford | 1-11

Semi-finals
Kerry | 1-18
Clare | 1-12
Tipperary | 1-9
Cork | 1-10

Final
Kerry | 1-23
Cork | 0-15

The Munster championship differed from the other provincial championships with regard to which teams were designated A or B in the qualifiers –

- the loser of Limerick v Clare went into the B qualifiers, while the loser of Cork v Waterford went into the A qualifiers
- the winner of Limerick v Clare joined Kerry on the A side of the draw, while the winner of Cork v Waterford joined Tipperary on the B side of the draw

=== Ulster Senior Football Championship ===
An un-seeded draw determines the fixtures for all nine teams.

Preliminary round
Monaghan | 1-20
Fermanagh | 1-11

Quarter-finals
Derry | 0-11
Tyrone | 0-22
Donegal | 3-19
Antrim | 1-9
Down | 0-15
Armagh | 2-7
Cavan | 0-15
Monaghan | 1-15

Semi-finals
Tyrone | 1-21
Donegal | 1-12
Down | 1-14
Monaghan | 0-15

Final
Tyrone | 2-17
Down | 0-15

=== Connacht Senior Football Championship ===
Preliminary round
New York | 1-13
Sligo | 1-21

Quarter-finals
Mayo | 2-14
Sligo | 0-11
London | 0-16
Leitrim | 3-10

Semi-finals
Galway | 0-15
Mayo | 1-11
Roscommon | 2-23
Leitrim | 1-09

Final
Galway | 0-12
Roscommon | 2-15

== All-Ireland Series ==
=== Qualifiers ===
==== A and B teams ====
An A and B system for the qualifier draws was introduced in 2014 and was retained. The teams were designated as A or B depending on which half of their provincial championships they played in. Although some teams receive byes in the early provincial rounds, their position in the round in which they entered the competition was usually determined by the provincial draw, resulting in most teams being designated as A or B randomly. For example, each of the four provinces had two semi-finals – one between two teams designated A and one between two teams designated B – and the beaten semi-finalists in each province were always one A team and one B team.

In all qualifier rounds A teams played A teams and B teams played B teams. Usually the A teams played their provincial games before the B teams, which allowed the A qualifier games to be scheduled a week before the B qualifier games. The A and B system attempted to ensure that teams beaten in the provincial championships had a least two weeks before playing their subsequent qualifier match, though this was not always possible.

==== Round 1 ====
In the first round of the qualifiers sixteen of the seventeen teams beaten in the preliminary rounds or quarter-finals of the provincial championships competed. New York did not enter the qualifiers. Four A teams played four A teams and four B teams played four B teams. The round 1 draw was unrestricted − if two teams had played each other in a provincial match they could be drawn to meet again, with the winner of the provincial match receiving home advantage. The eight round 1 winners played the eight beaten provincial semi-finalists in round 2 of the qualifiers.

The following teams took part in round 1;

Connacht (2)

Sligo (A)
London (B)

Leinster (7)

Laois (A)
Longford (A)
Louth (A)
Wicklow (A)
Carlow (B)
Offaly (B)
Wexford (B)

Munster (2)

Waterford (A)
Limerick (B)

Ulster (5)

Antrim (A)
Derry (A)
Armagh (B)
Cavan (B)
Fermanagh (B)

17 June 2017
3.00 PM
Round 1A

| Waterford | 0–13 – 1–17 | Derry |
|---|---|---|
| D Breathnach (0–5, 3 frees); G Crotty (0–3); T Prendergast, F Ó Cuirrín (0–2 each), P Whyte (0–1). | Report | D Heavron (1–1); J Kielt (2 frees), D Tallon (0–3 each); N Loughlin (1 free), C McFaul, R Bell (0–2 each); N Keenan, C McKaigue, E McGuckin, M Lynch (0–1 each). |

Fraher Field, Dungarvan
Attendance: 1, 067
Referee: J Henry (Mayo)

17 June 2017
5.00 PM
Round 1A

| Louth | 1–10 – 2–15 | Longford |
|---|---|---|
| Eoin O’Connor 1–0, James Califf 0–3 (2f), John Bingham 0–2, Ryan Burns 0–2 (1f), Gerard McSorley 0–1 (1free), Tommy Durnin 0–1, Jim McEneaney 0–1. | Report | Robbie Smyth 0–7 (4f, 1sl), Liam Connerton 1–1 (1–0 pen), Barry McKeon 1–0, David McGivney 0–2 (2f), Larry Moran 0–1, Micheal Quinn 0–1, Barry Gilleran 0–1, Dessie Reynolds 0–1, John Keegan 0–1 |

Gaelic Grounds, Drogheda
Referee: N Mooney (Cavan)

17 June 2017
5.00 PM
Round 1A

| Wicklow | 3–10 – 2–16 | Laois |
|---|---|---|
| S Furlong 0–3 (3f); Paddy Byrne 1–0; P Cunningham 2–3 (1f); J McGrath 0–2; M Kenny 0–2 | Report | G Walsh 1–3 (1f, 2 ‘45); D Kingston 0–5; C Begley 0–2; D Conway 0–1; J O’Loughlin 0–1; T Collins 0–1; A Farrell 0–1; R Munnelly 0–1; D O’Connor 0–1 |

Joule Park, Aughrim
Referee: B Cassidy (Derry)

17 June 2017
5.00 PM
Round 1A

| Sligo | 0–22 – 3–7 | Antrim |
|---|---|---|
| E McHugh (0–1), P O'Connor (0–2), M Breheny (0–1, 0-1f), N Murphy (0–2), S Coen (0–8, 0-4f), P Hughes (0–2), A Marren (0–5, 0-3f), K McDonnell (0–1) | Report | P McBride (1–1), C Murray (0–3), M Fitzpatrick (1–0), CJ McGourty (1–2, 1-0pen, 0-2f), T McCann (0–1) |

Markievicz Park, Sligo
Referee: F Kelly (Longford)

24 June 2017
3.00 PM
Round 1B

| Limerick | 0–11 – 0–12 | Wexford |
|---|---|---|
| Seamus O’Carroll 0–2 (1 45), Iain Corbett 0–2 (0–1 pen), Sean O’Dea 0–1, Ger Collins 0–1 (f), Josh Ryan 0–1, Danny Neville 0–1, Sean McSweeney 0–1 (f), Jamie Lee 0–1, Darragh Treacy 0–1. | Report | Ciaran Lyng 0–4 (2fs), PJ Banville 0–4 (1f), Michael Furlong 0–2, Adrian Flynn 0–1, John Tubritt 0–1. |

Gaelic Grounds, Limerick
Referee: Pádraig O’Sullivan (Kerry)

25 June 2017
1.00 PM
Round 1B

| London | 0–12 – 0–13 | Carlow |
|---|---|---|
| J Branagan (0–1), E Murray (0–2), L Gavaghan (0–4, 1f), R Mason (0–4, 4 frees), A Moyles (0–1) | Report | B Murphy (0–1), S Murphy (0–1), D Foley (c) (0–3, 2f), P Broderick (0–6, 6f), J Murphy (0–1), D O’Brien (0–1) |

McGovern Park, Ruislip

25 June 2017
6.30 PM
Round 1B

| Offaly | 0–16 – 1–17 | Cavan |
|---|---|---|
| B Darby (0–1), P Cunningham (0–1), G Guilfoyle (0–2), S Doyle (0–1), R McNamee (0–1), M Brazil (0–1), R Allen (0–1), N Dunne (0–5, 2 frees), B Allen (0–2), N McNamee (0–1) | Report | G Smith (0–1), C Moynagh (0–1), C Brady (0–1), L Buchanan (0–2), G McKiernan (1–4), S Johnston (0–2, frees), N McDermott (0–4, 2 frees), R Connolly (0–2 frees) |

O'Connor Park, Tullamore
Referee: Derek O’Mahoney (Tipperary)

25 June 2017
6.30 PM
Round 1B

| Armagh | 0–20 – 0–11 | Fermanagh |
|---|---|---|
| N Grimley (0–6, 4f, 1 ’45), C O’Hanlon (0–1), R Grugan (0–5, 5f), J Clarke (0–3), A Murnin (0–2), S Campbell (0–2), E Rafferty (0–1) | Report | E Donnelly (0–1), R Lyons (0–2), T Corrigan (0–6, 5f, 1 sideline), S Quigley (0–2) |

Athletic Grounds, Armagh
Attendance: 10,500
Referee: C Reilly (Meath)

==== Round 2 ====
In the second round of the qualifiers the eight winning teams from Round 1A and Round 1B played the eight beaten provincial semi-finalists. The round 2 draw was unrestricted − if two teams had played each other in a provincial match they could be drawn to meet again, with the winner of the provincial match receiving home advantage. The eight winners of these matches played each other in Round 3.

The following teams took part in round 2;

Round 1A
Winners (4)

Derry

Laois

Longford

Sligo

Beaten Provincial
Semi-finalists – A

Clare

Donegal

Mayo

Meath

Round 1B
Winners (4)

Armagh

Carlow

Cavan

Wexford

Beaten Provincial
Semi-finalists – B

Leitrim

Monaghan

Tipperary

Westmeath

1 July 2017
3.00 PM
Round 2A

| Laois | 0–14 – 2–18 | Clare |
|---|---|---|
| Laois: D Kingston 0–8 (7f), S Attride 0–3, G Walsh (f), C Begley, D Conway 0–1 each. | Report | E Cleary 0–9 (3f, 3 45s), K Sexton 1–2 (0-1f), G Brennan, C O'Connor, P Lillis 0–2 each, J Malone 0–1. |

O'Moore Park, Portlaoise
Referee: J Henry (Mayo)

| 1 July 2017; 5:00 PM; Round 2A | Mayo | 2–21 – 1–13 (AET) | Derry | MacHale Park, Castlebar; Attendance: 11,433; Referee: M Deegan (Laois); Man of the Match: Conor Loftus |
| 1 July 2017; 5:00 PM; Round 2A | Cillian O’Connor 0–12 (0-9f, 1 '45); Conor Loftus 1–1, Jason Doherty 1–1, Andy Moran 0–2, Kevin McLoughlin, Aidan O’Shea, Diarmuid O’Connor, Lee Keegan, Patrick Durcan 0–1 each | Report | Niall Loughlin 0–6 (5f), Mark Lynch 1–1, Ryan Bell 0–3, Benny Heron, James Kielt, Danny Heavron 0–1 each | MacHale Park, Castlebar; Attendance: 11,433; Referee: M Deegan (Laois); Man of the Match: Conor Loftus |

1 July 2017
5:00 PM
Round 2A

| Donegal | 0–12 – 0–7 | Longford |
|---|---|---|
| Patrick McBrearty 0–5 (4f), Michael Murphy 0–3 (3f), Martin McElhinney 0–2, Jamie Brennan and Eoin McHugh 0–1 each. | Report | David McGivney 0–3 (3f), Robbie Smyth 0–3 (2f), Diarmuid Masterson 0–1. |

MacCumhaill Park, Ballybofey
Attendance: 9, 915
Referee: Padraig Hughes (Armagh)

1 July 2017
6.00 PM
Round 2A

| Meath | 0–14 – 1–9 | Sligo |
|---|---|---|
| Donal Lenihan 0–3 (3f), Sean Tobin 0–3 (0–1 ’45), Graham Reilly 0–2, Michael Newman 0–2 (0-2f), Cillian O’Sullivan 0–1, Ronan Jones 0–1, James McEntee 0–1, Shane McEntee 0–1 | Report | Gerard O’Kelly-Lynch 1–1, Adrian Marren 0–4 (0-3f, 0–1 ’45), Neil Ewing 0–1, Pat Hughes 0–1, Niall Murphy 0–1, David Kelly 0–1 |

Páirc Tailteann, Navan
Referee: Noel Mooney (Cavan)

8 July 2017
2.00 PM
Round 2B

| Cavan | 0–18 – 2–15 | Tipperary |
|---|---|---|
| Geariod McKiernan 0–3 (1f), Thomas Corr 0–2, Martin Reilly 0–2, Caoimhin O'Reilly 0–2, N McDermott 0–2 (2f), Seanie Johnston 0–2 (1f), Padraig Faulkner, Conor Moynagh, Cian Mackey, D McVeety, Thomas Galligan 0–1 each. | Report | Conor Sweeney 1–5 (1 pen, 5f), Robbie Kiely 1–1, Jack Kennedy 0–3 (2f), Kevin O’Halloran 0–2 (1f), Brian Fox, D Foley, Philip Austin, Michael Quinlivan 0–1 each |

Breffni Park, Cavan
Referee: F Kelly (Longford)

8 July 2017
3.00 PM
Round 2B

| Carlow | 2–14 – 0–13 | Leitrim |
|---|---|---|
| Paul Broderick 1–6 (3f), Darragh Foley 0–2 (1f), Ciaran Moran 1–1, Eoghan Ruth, Gary Kelly, Kieran Nolan, Sean Gannon, Shane Clarke 0–1 each | Report | Ryan O’Rourke 0–4, Ronan Kennedy 0–4 (4f), Brendan Gallagher 0–2 (1f), Conor Cullen 0–1, Darragh Rooney 0–1, Keith Beirne 0–1 (f) |

Dr. Cullen Park, Carlow
Referee: Padraig Hughes (Armagh)

8 July 2017
3.00 PM
Round 2B

| Wexford | 1–11 – 3–23 | Monaghan |
|---|---|---|
| Ben Brosnan 1–5 (3fs, 145), Ciaran Lyng 0–3 (3fs), P J Banville 0–2 (1f), Adrian Flynn 0–1 | Report | Kieran Duffy, Owen Duffy 1–1 each, Fintan Kelly 1–0, C McCarthy 0–4 (2fs), D Freeman, S Carey, Jack McCarron (1f) 0–3 each, Kieran Hughes, G Doogan 0–2 each, D Malone, D Ward, Colin Walshe, C McManus 0–1 each |

Wexford Park, Wexford
Attendance: 3, 501
Referee: C Lane (Cork)

8 July 2017
7.00 PM
Round 2B

| Westmeath | 1–7 – 1–12 | Armagh |
|---|---|---|
| Paul Sharry 1–0, John Heslin 0–6 (4f), Alan Gaughan 0–1 | Report | Ethan Rafferty 1–0, Gavin McParland 0–3, Rory Grugan 0–3 (2f), Oisin O’Neill 0–2, Aidan Forker, Stephen Sheridan, Niall Grimley (f), Stefan Campbell 0–1 each |

Cusack Park, Mullingar
Attendance: 5, 012
Referee: P O'Sullivan (Kerry)

==== Round 3 ====
In the third round of the qualifiers winning teams from round 2A played against winning teams from round 2A, while winning teams from round 2B played against winning teams from round 2B. Round 3 draw rules did not allow two teams that had played each other in a provincial match to meet again if such a pairing could be avoided. The four winners of these matches played the four beaten provincial finalists in round 4.

The following teams took part in round 3;

Round 2A Winners (4)

Clare

Donegal

Mayo

Meath

Round 2B Winners (4)

Armagh

Carlow

Monaghan

Tipperary

8 July 2017
5.00 PM
Round 3A

| Clare | 0–13 – 2–14 | Mayo |
|---|---|---|
| David Tubridy 0–4 (4fs), Eoin Cleary 0–3 (2fs), Keelan Sexton 0–2 (1 45), Jamie Malone, Sean Collins, Gary Brennan, and Gearoid O’Brien 0–1 each | Report | Cillian O’Connor 1–5 (5f), Diarmuid O’Connor 1–1, Andy Moran 0–3, Kevin McLoughlin 0–2, Lee Keegan, Keith Higgins, and Aidan O’Shea 0–1 each |

Cusack Park, Ennis
Attendance: 11,576
Referee: Sean Hurson (Tyrone)

8 July 2017
6.00 PM
Round 3A

| Meath | 1–14 – 1–15 | Donegal |
|---|---|---|
| Donal Lenihan 0–7 (7f), Cillian O'Sullivan 1–1, Graham Reilly 0–1, Ruairi O Coileain 0–1, Donal Keogan 0–1, Shane McEntee 0–1, James McEntee 0–1, Bryan Menton 0–1 | Report | Patrick McBrearty 0–7 (3f), Michael Murphy 0–5 (2f), Ryan McHugh 1–0, Jason McGee 0–2, Frank McGlynn 0–1 |

Páirc Tailteann, Navan
Attendance: 11,100
Referee: Derek O'Mahoney (Tipperary)

15 July 2017
5.00 PM
Round 3B

| Tipperary | 1–15 – 1–17 | Armagh |
|---|---|---|
| Josh Keane 0–4 (2fs), Michael Quinlivan 1–0, Conor Sweeney 0–3 (3fs), Liam Casey, Kevin O’Halloran (1f), Jack Kennedy (2fs) 0–2 each, Brian Fox and Philip Austin 0–1 each | Report | Niall Grimley 0–8 (5fs, 1 45), Jamie Clarke 1–1, Gavin McParland and Rory Grugan (1f) 0–2 each, Aidan Forker, Stephen Sheridan, Gregory McCabe and Stefan Campbell 0–1 each |

Semple Stadium, Thurles
Attendance: 6,823
Referee: Paddy Neilan (Roscommon)

15 July 2017
7.00 PM
Round 3B

| Carlow | 1–7 – 1–12 | Monaghan |
|---|---|---|
| Paul Broderick 0–5 (5f), Gary Kelly 1–0, Brendan Murphy 0–2 | Report | Kieran Hughes 0–3, Conor McManus 0–3 (2f), Fintan Kelly 1–0, Conor McCarthy 0–2 (1f), Rory Beggan 0–1 (1f), Shane Carey 0–1, Ryan McAnespie 0–1. Dermot Malone 0–1 |

Dr. Cullen Park, Carlow
Attendance: 6,124
Referee: Cormac Reilly (Meath)

==== Round 4 ====
In the fourth round of the qualifiers, the four winning teams from round 3 played the four beaten provincial finalists. Round 4 draw rules did not allow two teams that had played each other in a provincial match to meet again if such a pairing could be avoided. The matches were normally held in neutral venues. The four winners of these matches played the provincial champions in the All-Ireland quarter-finals.

The following teams took part in round 4;

Round 3A
Winners

Donegal

Mayo

Beaten Provincial
Finalists – A

Cork

Galway

Round 3B
Winners

Armagh

Monaghan

Beaten Provincial
Finalists – B

Down

Kildare

- Galway had beaten Mayo in the Connacht semi-final. In order to avoid a repeat pairing of Galway and Mayo, the round 4A fixtures of Galway v Donegal and Mayo v Cork were arranged without the need for a draw.
- Down had beaten both Armagh and Monaghan in the Ulster championship meaning that a repeat pairing was unavoidable in round 4B. A draw held on Monday 17 July 2017 determined that Down would meet Monaghan again.

| 22 July; 5:00pm Round 4A | Mayo | 0–27 – 2–20 (AET) | Cork | Gaelic Grounds, Limerick; Attendance: 13,505; Referee: Ciaran Branagan (Down); Man of the Match: Cillian O'Connor (Ballintubber) |
| 22 July; 5:00pm Round 4A | Cillian O’Connor 0–11 (0-4f, 1 '45), Andy Moran 0–4, Aidan O’Shea 0–3, Patrick Durcan and Conor Loftus 0–2 each, Keith Higgins, Lee Keegan, Tom Parsons, Diarmuid O'Connor, Jason Doherty 0–1 each | Report | Donncha O'Connor 0–6 (0-4f), Luke Connolly 1–1 (0-1f), Sean Powter 1–0, John O'Rourke, Paul Kerrigan, Colm O'Neill (0-1f) 0–3 each, Michael Hurley 0–2, Tomas Clancy and Barry O'Driscoll 0–1 each | Gaelic Grounds, Limerick; Attendance: 13,505; Referee: Ciaran Branagan (Down); Man of the Match: Cillian O'Connor (Ballintubber) |

| 22 July; 7:00pm Round 4A | Donegal | 0–14 – 4–17 | Galway | Markievicz Park, Sligo; Attendance: 10,564; Referee: Anthony Nolan (Wicklow); Man of the Match: Johnny Heaney (Killanin) |
| 22 July; 7:00pm Round 4A | Paddy McBrearty 0–6 (2f), Michael Murphy 0–4 (3f, 1 '45), Martin O’Reilly 0–2, Martin McElhinney 0–1, Michael Langan 0–1 | Report | Johnny Heaney 2–2, Sean Armstrong 0–6 (4f), Liam Silke 1–0 (pen), Danny Cummins 1–0, Gary O’Donnell 0–2, Shane Walsh 0–1, Paul Conroy 0–1, Ian Burke 0–1, Damien Comer 0–1, Eamonn Brannigan 0–2, Michael Daly 0–1 | Markievicz Park, Sligo; Attendance: 10,564; Referee: Anthony Nolan (Wicklow); Man of the Match: Johnny Heaney (Killanin) |

| 29 July; 5:00 pm Round 4B | Down | 1–16 – 1–24 | Monaghan | Croke Park, Dublin; Referee: Maurice Deegan (Laois); Man of the Match: Kieran Hughes (Scotstown) |
| 29 July; 5:00 pm Round 4B | Connaire Harrison 1–4, Jerome Johnston 0–3 (0-1f), Darragh O'Hanlon (0-2f), Kevin McKernan, Conor Maginn 0–2 each, Caolan Mooney, Shay Millar, David McKibbin 0–1 each | Report | Conor McManus 0–10 (0-8f), Conor McCarthy 0–4, Kieran Hughes (0-1f) and Darren Hughes 0–3 each, Fintan Kelly 1–0, Jack McCarron 0–2, Ryan Wylie and Owen Duffy 0–1 each. | Croke Park, Dublin; Referee: Maurice Deegan (Laois); Man of the Match: Kieran Hughes (Scotstown) |

| 29 July; 7:00 pm Round 4B | Kildare | 0–17 – 1–17 | Armagh | Croke Park, Dublin; Referee: Derek O'Mahoney (Tipperary); Man of the Match: Jamie Clarke (Crossmaglen Rangers) |
| 29 July; 7:00 pm Round 4B | Kevin Feely 0-5f, Paddy Brophy 0–3, Keith Cribbin, Fergal Conway, Niall Kelly 0–2, Mark Donnellan (0-1f), Daniel Flynn, Ben McCormack 0–1 each | Report | Andrew Murnin 1–1, Jamie Clarke 0–4, Gavin McParland 0–3, Niall Grimley (0-2f) and Rory Grugan (0-1f) 0–2 each, Brendan Donaghy, Aidan Forker, Stefan Campbell, Joe McElroy, Ethan Rafferty 0–1 each | Croke Park, Dublin; Referee: Derek O'Mahoney (Tipperary); Man of the Match: Jamie Clarke (Crossmaglen Rangers) |

Quarter-finals
30 July & 7 August, Croke Park
Roscommon (R) | 2-9; 0-9
Mayo (R) | 1-12; 4-19
30 July, Croke Park
Kerry | 1–18
Galway | 0–13
5 August, Croke Park
Tyrone | 3–17
Armagh | 0–8
5 August, Croke Park
Dublin | 1–19
Monaghan | 0–12

Semi-finals
20 & 26 August, Croke Park
Mayo (R) | 2-14; 2-16
Kerry (R) | 2-14; 0-17
27 August, Croke Park
Tyrone | 0–11
Dublin | 2–17

Final
17 September, Croke Park
Mayo | 1-16
Dublin | 1-17

=== Quarter-finals ===
The four provincial champions played the four winners from round 4 of the qualifiers. Draw rules 1) Two teams who met in a provincial final could not meet again 2) If one of the provincial champions had already met one of the qualifiers in an earlier match then those two teams could not be drawn together if such a pairing could be avoided.

This was the final year of the knock-out quarter-finals which began with the introduction of the All-Ireland qualifiers in 2001. Following a vote at the GAA congress on Saturday 25 February 2017, the last eight teams in 2018 competed in two groups of four with the winners and runners-up in each group progressing to the semi-finals.

| 30 July; 2:00 pm Quarter-final | Kerry | 1–18 – 0–13 | Galway | Croke Park, Dublin; Attendance: 65,746; Referee: David Coldrick (Meath); Man of the Match: Paul Murphy (Rathmore) |
| 30 July; 2:00 pm Quarter-final | Kieran Donaghy 1–1, Paul Geaney 0–4 (0-1f), Paul Murphy, David Moran, Johnny Buckley, Stephen O'Brien, Barry John Keane 0–2 each, Donnchadh Walsh, James O'Donoghue (0-1f), Jack Savage 0–1 each | Report | Ian Burke 0–5 (0-1f), Sean Armstrong 0–4 (0-1f), Johnny Heaney, Michael Daly, Shane Walsh (0-1f), Eamonn Brannigan 0–1 each | Croke Park, Dublin; Attendance: 65,746; Referee: David Coldrick (Meath); Man of the Match: Paul Murphy (Rathmore) |

| 30 July; 4:00 pm Quarter-final | Roscommon | 2–9 – 1–12 | Mayo | Croke Park, Dublin; Attendance: 65,746; Referee: Joe McQuillan (Cavan); Man of the Match: Lee Keegan (Westport) |
| 30 July; 4:00 pm Quarter-final | Ciaran Murtagh 1–2 (0-2f), Fintan Cregg 1–1, Diarmuid Murtagh and Donie Smith (0-1f) 0–2 each, Enda Smith and Conor Devaney 0–1 each | Report | Lee Keegan 1–3, Cillian O’Connor 0–3 (0-2f), Andy Moran and Paddy Durcan 0–2 each, Colm Boyle and Jason Doherty 0–1 each. | Croke Park, Dublin; Attendance: 65,746; Referee: Joe McQuillan (Cavan); Man of the Match: Lee Keegan (Westport) |

| 5 August; 4:00 pm Quarter-final | Tyrone | 3–17 – 0–8 | Armagh | Croke Park, Dublin; Attendance: 82,000; Referee: David Gough (Meath); Man of the Match: Peter Harte (Errigal Ciaran) |
| 5 August; 4:00 pm Quarter-final | David Mulgrew 2–1, Peter Harte 1–2 (1–0 pen), Sean Cavanagh 0–4 (0-3f), Mark Bradley 0–3, Niall Morgan 0-2f, Tiernan McCann, Colm Cavanagh, Declan McClure, Mattie Donnelly, Darren McCurry 0–1 each | Report | Rory Grugan 0–3 (0-2f), Paul Hughes, Mark Shields, Niall Grimley (0-1f), Jamie Clarke, Gavin McParland 0–1 each | Croke Park, Dublin; Attendance: 82,000; Referee: David Gough (Meath); Man of the Match: Peter Harte (Errigal Ciaran) |

| 5 August; 6:00 pm Quarter-final | Dublin | 1–19 – 0–12 | Monaghan | Croke Park, Dublin; Attendance: 82,000; Referee: Conor Lane (Cork); Man of the Match: Dean Rock (Ballymun Kickhams) |
| 5 August; 6:00 pm Quarter-final | Dean Rock 1–8 (0-7f, 1 '45), Paul Mannion and Paddy Andrews 0–3 each, James McCarthy, Con O’Callaghan, Jack McCaffrey, Paul Flynn, Eoghan O’Gara 0–1 each | Report | Conor McManus 0–4 (0-3f), Conor McCarthy 0–3, Rory Beggan (0-1f), Colin Walshe, Karl O’Connell, Darren Hughes, Ryan McAnespie 0–1 each | Croke Park, Dublin; Attendance: 82,000; Referee: Conor Lane (Cork); Man of the Match: Dean Rock (Ballymun Kickhams) |

| 7 August; 2:00 pm Quarter-final Replay | Mayo | 4–19 – 0–9 | Roscommon | Croke Park, Dublin; Attendance: 39,154; Referee: Anthony Nolan (Wicklow); Man of the Match: Aidan O'Shea (Breaffy) |
| 7 August; 2:00 pm Quarter-final Replay | Cillian O’Connor 1–6 (0-5f), Andy Moran 1–1, Keith Higgins and Kevin McLoughlin 1–0 each, Aidan O’Shea, Jason Doherty, Shane Nally 0–2 each, Donal Vaughan, Chris Barrett, Tom Parsons, Diarmuid O’Connor, David Drake, Stephen Coen 0–1 each | Report | Diarmuid Murtagh 0–4 (0-2f), Sean Mullooly, Enda Smith, Niall Kilroy, Conor Devaney, Donie Smith 0–1 each | Croke Park, Dublin; Attendance: 39,154; Referee: Anthony Nolan (Wicklow); Man of the Match: Aidan O'Shea (Breaffy) |

=== Semi-finals ===
There was no draw for the semi-finals as the fixtures were pre-determined on a three yearly rotation. This rotation ensured that a provinces champions played the champions of the other three provinces once every three years in the semi-finals if they each won their quarter-finals and prevented the champions from the same two provinces meeting in the semi-finals in successive years. If a qualifier team were to defeat a provincial winner in a quarter-final, the qualifier team would take that provincial winner's place in the semi-final.

| 20 August; 3:30 pm Semi-final | Mayo | 2–14 – 2–14 | Kerry | Croke Park, Dublin; Attendance: 66,195; Referee: Maurice Deegan (Laois); Man of the Match: Andy Moran (Ballaghaderreen) |
| 20 August; 3:30 pm Semi-final | Andy Moran 1–5, Cillian O’Connor 0–4 (0-1f), Colm Boyle 1–0, Tom Parsons 0–2, Donal Vaughan, Jason Doherty, Patrick Durcan 0–1 each | Report | Paul Geaney 0–7 (0-4f), Johnny Buckley and Stephen O’Brien 1–0 each, James O’Donoghue 0–3 (0-2f), Killian Young, Paul Murphy, Kieran Donaghy, Barry John Keane 0–1 each | Croke Park, Dublin; Attendance: 66,195; Referee: Maurice Deegan (Laois); Man of the Match: Andy Moran (Ballaghaderreen) |

| 26 August; 3:00 pm Semi-final Replay | Mayo | 2–16 – 0–17 | Kerry | Croke Park, Dublin; Attendance: 53,032; Referee: David Gough (Meath); Man of the Match: Colm Boyle (Davitts) |
| 26 August; 3:00 pm Semi-final Replay | Cillian O'Connor 0-6f, Andy Moran 1–1, Diarmuid O'Connor 1–0, Jason Doherty 0–3 (0-1f, 1 '45), Kevin McLoughlin and Conor Loftus 0–2 each, Chris Barrett and Patrick Durcan 0–1 each | Report | Paul Geaney 0–10 (0-8f), James O'Donoghue 0–3 (0-1f), Jack Barry, Jonathan Lyne, Johnny Buckley, Fionn Fitzgerald 0–1 each | Croke Park, Dublin; Attendance: 53,032; Referee: David Gough (Meath); Man of the Match: Colm Boyle (Davitts) |

| 27 August; 4:00 pm Semi-final | Dublin | 2–17 – 0–11 | Tyrone | Croke Park, Dublin; Attendance: 82,300; Referee: David Coldrick (Meath); Man of the Match: Jack McCaffrey (Clontarf) |
| 27 August; 4:00 pm Semi-final | Con O'Callaghan 1–2, Dean Rock 0–5 (0-4f), Eoghan O'Gara 1–1, Paul Flynn 0–3, Paddy Andrews 0–2, Jack McCaffrey, Brian Fenton, Ciaran Kilkenny, Paul Mannion 0–1 each | Report | Peter Harte 0–4 (0-3f), Colm Cavanagh and Niall Sludden 0–2 each, Tiernan McCann, Sean Cavanagh (0-1f), Declan McClure 0–1 each | Croke Park, Dublin; Attendance: 82,300; Referee: David Coldrick (Meath); Man of the Match: Jack McCaffrey (Clontarf) |

=== Final ===
| 17 September 2017; 3:30 pm | Dublin | 1–17 – 1–16 | Mayo | Croke Park, Dublin; Attendance: 82,243; Referee: Joe McQuillan (Cavan); Man of the Match: James McCarthy (Ballymun) |
| 17 September 2017; 3:30 pm | Dean Rock 0–7 (0-3f), Con O’Callaghan 1–0, Paul Mannion 0–3, James McCarthy 0–2, John Small, Brian Fenton, Eoghan O’Gara, Diarmuid Connolly, Kevin McManamon 0–1 each | Report | Cillian O’Connor 0–7 (0-4f), Lee Keegan 1–0, Andy Moran 0–3, Kevin McLoughlin, Jason Doherty 0–2 each, Donal Vaughan, Colm Boyle 0–1 each | Croke Park, Dublin; Attendance: 82,243; Referee: Joe McQuillan (Cavan); Man of the Match: James McCarthy (Ballymun) |

== Stadia and locations ==
Each team has a nominal home stadium, though not all teams are guaranteed a home game over the course of the Championship. In addition, games may be played at a neutral or alternate venue. For example, Dublin have not played a Championship game in Parnell Park, their nominal home, since the 2004 Championship.

| Team | Location | Stadium | Stadium capacity |
| Antrim | Belfast | Casement Park | 32,500 |
| Armagh | Armagh | Athletic Grounds | 19,500 |
| Carlow | Carlow | Dr Cullen Park | 21,000 |
| Cavan | Cavan | Breffni Park | 32,000 |
| Clare | Ennis | Cusack Park | 14,864 |
| Cork | Cork | Páirc Uí Chaoimh | 50,288 |
| Derry | Derry | Celtic Park | 22,000 |
| Donegal | Ballybofey | MacCumhaill Park | 18,000 |
| Down | Newry | Páirc Esler | 25,000 |
| Dublin | Dublin | Parnell Park | 12,000 |
| Fermanagh | Enniskillen | Brewster Park | 20,000 |
| Galway | Galway | Pearse Stadium | 26,197 |
| Kerry | Killarney | Fitzgerald Stadium | 43,180 |
| Kildare | Newbridge | St Conleth's Park | 6,200 |
| Laois | Portlaoise | O'Moore Park | 27,000 |
| Leitrim | Carrick-on-Shannon | Páirc Seán Mac Diarmada | 9,331 |
| Limerick | Limerick | Gaelic Grounds | 49,866 |

| Team | Location | Stadium | Stadium capacity |
| London | Ruislip | Emerald GAA Grounds | 5,000 |
| Longford | Longford | Pearse Park | 10,000 |
| Louth | Drogheda | Drogheda Park | 7,000 |
| Mayo | Castlebar | MacHale Park | 42,000 |
| Meath | Navan | Páirc Tailteann | 10,000 |
| Monaghan | Clones | St Tiernach's Park | 36,000 |
| New York | Kingsbridge | Gaelic Park | 2,000 |
| Offaly | Tullamore | O'Connor Park | 20,000 |
| Roscommon | Roscommon | Dr Hyde Park | 25,000 |
| Sligo | Sligo | Markievicz Park | 18,558 |
| Tipperary | Thurles | Semple Stadium | 53,500 |
| Tyrone | Omagh | Healy Park | 26,500 |
| Waterford | Waterford | Walsh Park | 17,000 |
| Westmeath | Mullingar | Cusack Park | 11,000 |
| Wexford | Wexford | Wexford Park | 20,000 |
| Wicklow | Aughrim | Aughrim County Ground | 10,000 |

== Referees Panel ==
As announced in May 2017:

Cormac Reilly (Meath) returned after missing 2016, while Eddie Kinsella (Laois) retired at the end of 2016.

This was a first year as a referee in the SFC for two men: Niall Cullen (Fermanagh) and Jerome Henry (Mayo).

Championship Panel
| Name | County | Club | Matches refereed |
|---|---|---|---|
| BRANAGAN, Ciarán | Down | | |
| CASSIDY, Barry | Derry | Bellaghy | |
| COLDRICK, David | Meath | Blackhall Gaels | |
| CULLEN, Niall | Fermanagh | | |
| DEEGAN, Maurice | Laois | Stradbally | |
| DUFFY, Martin | Sligo | Kilgass | |
| GOUGH, David | Meath | Slane | |
| HENRY, Jerome | Mayo | | |
| HICKEY, Rory | Clare | | |
| HUGHES, Pádraig | Armagh | | |
| HURSON, Sean | Tyrone | Galbally Pearses | |
| KELLY, Fergal | Longford | | |
| LANE, Conor | Cork | Banteer | |
| MCQUILLAN, Joe | Cavan | Kill Shamrocks | |
| MOONEY, Noel | Cavan | | |
| NEILAN, Paddy | Roscommon | St Faithleach's | |
| NOLAN, Annthony | Wicklow | | |
| O'MAHONEY, Derek | Tipperary | | |
| O'SULLIVAN, Padraig | Kerry | | |
| REILLY, Cormac | Meath | | |

Linesman Panel

1. James Bermingham (Cork)
2. Brendan Cawley (Kildare)
3. Liam Devenney (Mayo)
4. Paul Faloon (Down)
5. John Hickey (Carlow)
6. Shaun McLaughlin (Donegal)
7. Martin McNally (Monaghan)
8. James Molloy (Galway)

== Statistics ==
- All scores correct as of 21 September 2017

=== Top scorer: overall ===
| Rank | Player | County | Tally | Total | Matches | Average |
|---|---|---|---|---|---|---|
| 1 | Cillian O'Connor | Mayo | 3–66 | 75 | 10 | 7.5 |
| 2 | Dean Rock | Dublin | 3–31 | 40 | 6 | 6.7 |
| 3 | Conor McManus | Monaghan | 2–31 | 37 | 7 | 5.3 |
| 4 | Paul Broderick | Carlow | 1–30 | 33 | 5 | 6.6 |
| 4 | Andy Moran | Mayo | 3–24 | 33 | 10 | 3.3 |
| 6 | Paul Geaney | Kerry | 1–29 | 32 | 5 | 6.4 |
| 7 | Patrick McBrearty | Donegal | 1–26 | 29 | 5 | 5.8 |
| 8 | Con O'Callaghan | Dublin | 2–20 | 26 | 6 | 4.3 |
| 9 | Donal Kingston | Laois | 2–19 | 25 | 4 | 6.25 |
| 10 | Eoin Cleary | Clare | 1–22 | 25 | 4 | 6.2 |
| 11 | James O'Donoghue | Kerry | 0–24 | 24 | 5 | 4.8 |
| 12 | John Heslin | Westmeath | 1–20 | 23 | 3 | 7.7 |
| 13 | Michael Murphy | Donegal | 0–21 | 21 | 5 | 4.2 |
| 13 | Robbie Smyth | Longford | 0–21 | 21 | 3 | 7 |
| 13 | Donal Lenihan | Meath | 0–21 | 21 | 4 | 5.2 |
| 16 | Conor Sweeney | Tipperary | 2–13 | 19 | 3 | 6.3 |

=== Top scorer: from play ===
| Rank | Player | County | Tally | Total | Matches | Average |
|---|---|---|---|---|---|---|
| 1 | Andy Moran | Mayo | 3–24 | 33 | 10 | 3.3 |
| 2 | Cillian O'Connor | Mayo | 3–18 | 27 | 10 | 2.7 |
| 3 | Con O'Callaghan | Dublin | 2–12 | 18 | 6 | 3.0 |
| 4 | Paul Mannion | Dublin | 0–17 | 17 | 6 | 2.8 |
| 5 | Conor McManus | Monaghan | 2–10 | 16 | 7 | 2.3 |
| 5 | Paul Geaney | Kerry | 1–13 | 16 | 5 | 3.2 |
| 5 | Patrick McBrearty | Donegal | 1–13 | 16 | 5 | 3.2 |
| 5 | Daniel Flynn | Kildare | 2–10 | 16 | 4 | 4.0 |

=== Top scorer: single game ===
| Rank | Player | County | Tally | Total | Opposition |
|---|---|---|---|---|---|
| 1 | John Heslin | Westmeath | 1–10 | 13 | Offaly |
| 2 | Con O'Callaghan | Dublin | 0–12 | 12 | Kildare |
| 2 | Cillian O'Connor | Mayo | 0–12 | 12 | Derry |
| 4 | Robbie Smyth | Longford | 0–11 | 11 | Laois |
| 4 | Cillian O'Connor | Mayo | 0–11 | 11 | Cork |
| 4 | Dean Rock | Dublin | 1–8 | 11 | Monaghan |
| 7 | Paul Broderick | Carlow | 0–10 | 10 | Wexford |
| 7 | Conor McManus | Monaghan | 0–10 | 10 | Down |
| 9 | Eoin Cleary | Clare | 0–9 | 9 | Laois |
| 9 | James O'Donoghue | Kerry | 0–9 | 9 | Clare |
| 9 | Paul Broderick | Carlow | 1–6 | 9 | Leitrim |
| 9 | Cillian O'Connor | Mayo | 1–6 | 9 | Sligo |
| 9 | Cillian O'Connor | Mayo | 1–6 | 9 | Roscommon |
| 9 | Paul Cunningham | Wicklow | 2–3 | 9 | Laois |

=== Scoring events ===
- Widest winning margin: 31
  - Dublin 4–29 – 0–10 Westmeath (Leinster SFC semi-final)
- Most goals in a match: 5
  - Wicklow 3–10 – 2–16 Laois (All-Ireland SFC Qualifiers 1A)
- Most points in a 70-minute match: 40
  - Dublin 2–23 – 1–17 Kildare (Leinster SFC final)
  - Monaghan 1–24 – 1–16 Down (All-Ireland SFC Qualifiers 4B)
- Most points in a match (including extra-time): 47
  - Mayo 0–27 – 2–20 Cork (All-Ireland SFC Qualifiers 4A)
- Most goals by one team in a match: 4
  - Laois 4–15 – 0–16 Longford (Leinster SFC quarter-final)
  - Dublin 4–29 – 0–10 Westmeath (Leinster SFC semi-final)
  - Galway 4–17 – 0–14 Donegal (All-Ireland SFC Qualifiers 4A)
  - Mayo 4–19 – 0–9 Roscommon (All-Ireland SFC quarter-final replay)
- Most goals by a losing team: 3
  - Meath 0–27 – 3–9 Louth (Leinster SFC quarter-final)
  - Wicklow 3–10 – 2–16 Laois (All-Ireland SFC Qualifiers 1A)
  - Sligo 0–22 – 3–7 Antrim (All-Ireland SFC Qualifiers 1A)
- Highest aggregate score in a 70-minute match: 51 points
  - Dublin 4–29 – 0–10 Westmeath (Leinster SFC semi-final)
- Highest aggregate score in a match (including extra-time): 53 points
  - Mayo 0–27 – 2–20 Cork (All-Ireland SFC Qualifiers 4A)
- Lowest aggregate score: 19 points
  - Donegal 0–12 – 0–7 Longford (All-Ireland SFC Qualifiers 2A)

=== Miscellaneous ===
- The Dublin-Carlow game was the first championship meeting between the sides since 1988.
- Down beat Armagh for the first time since 1992.
- Kerry won their 5th Munster title in a row for the first time since winning 8 in a row (1975–1982).
- Dublin become the first county to win 7 Leinster titles in a row.
- Mayo defeated Kerry for the first time in 21 years and only their second time in 66 years.
- First-time championship meetings:
  - Waterford vs Derry (Qualifiers Round 1A)
  - Sligo vs Antrim (Qualifiers Round 1A)
  - London vs Carlow (Qualifiers Round 1B)
  - Meath vs Sligo (Qualifiers Round 2A)
  - Westmeath vs Armagh (Qualifiers Round 2B)
  - Carlow vs Leitrim (Qualifiers Round 2B)
  - Clare vs Mayo (Qualifiers Round 3A)
  - Carlow vs Monaghan (Qualifiers Round 3B)
  - Tipperary vs Armagh (Qualifiers Round 3B)
  - Kildare vs Armagh (Qualifiers Round 4B)
- Dublin are the first county since Kerry (1984–1986) to win 3 All Ireland Championships in a row.
- Carlow won three championship games for the first time since 1944.

== Broadcast rights ==
Matches were broadcast live on television in Ireland on RTÉ and Sky Sports under a new five-year contract that was agreed in December 2016. In the United Kingdom, matches were shown on Sky Sports and worldwide coverage was provided on GAAGO. RTÉ Radio 1 also had full radio rights to all championship games which were previously shared with Newstalk.

RTÉ coverage was shown on RTÉ Two on The Sunday Game Live presented by Michael Lyster in high definition. Des Cahill presented The Sunday Game highlights and analysis show on Sunday evening.

=== Live TV coverage ===
RTÉ, the national broadcaster in Ireland, provide the majority of the live television coverage of the football championship in the first year of a five-year deal running from 2017 until 2021. Sky Sports also broadcast a number of matches and have exclusive rights to some games including two All-Ireland football quarter-finals. BBC Northern Ireland broadcast all games from the Ulster Championship which are shown live on RTÉ, with full deferred coverage later in the evening of those games not shown live.

Live Football On TV Schedule
| Date | Fixture & Match Details | RTÉ Sky Sports |
Provincial and Qualifier Matches
| 20 May | Monaghan v Fermanagh; Ulster Preliminary round | RTÉ; BBC NI |
| 21 May | Mayo v Sligo; Connacht Quarter-final | RTÉ |
| 28 May | Derry v Tyrone; Ulster Quarter-final | RTÉ; BBC NI |
| 3 June | Dublin v Carlow; Leinster Quarter-final | Sky Sports |
| 4 June | Down v Armagh; Ulster Quarter-final | RTÉ; BBC NI |
| 10 June | Cork v Tipperary; Munster Semi-final | RTÉ |
| 11 June | Cavan v Monaghan; Ulster Quarter-final | RTÉ; BBC NI |
| 11 June | Galway v Mayo; Connacht Semi-final | RTÉ |
| 17 June | Kildare v Meath; Leinster Semi-final | Sky Sports |
| 18 June | Tyrone v Donegal; Ulster Semi-final | RTÉ; BBC NI |
| 24 June | Down v Monaghan; Ulster Semi-final | RTÉ; BBC NI |
| 25 June | Dublin v Westmeath; Leinster Semi-final | RTÉ |
| 1 July | Mayo v Derry; Qualifier Round 2A | RTÉ |
| 2 July | Cork v Kerry; Munster Final | RTÉ |
| 8 July | Clare v Mayo; Qualifier Round 3A | RTÉ |
| 9 July | Galway v Roscommon; Connacht Final | RTÉ |
| 15 July | Tipperary v Armagh; Qualifier Round 3B | Sky Sports |
| 15 July | Carlow v Monaghan; Qualifier Round 3B | Sky Sports |
| 16 July | Tyrone v Down; Ulster Final | RTÉ; BBC NI |
| 16 July | Dublin v Kildare; Leinster Final | RTÉ |
| 22 July | Mayo v Cork; Qualifier Round 4A | Sky Sports |
| 22 July | Donegal v Galway; Qualifier Round 4A | Sky Sports |
| 29 July | Down v Monaghan; Qualifier Round 4B | Sky Sports |
| 29 July | Kildare v Armagh; Qualifier Round 4B | Sky Sports |
All-Ireland Football Quarter-finals
| 30 July | Kerry v Galway | RTÉ |
| 30 July | Mayo v Roscommon | RTÉ |
| 5 August | Tyrone v Armagh | Sky Sports |
| 5 August | Dublin v Monaghan | Sky Sports |
| 7 August | Mayo v Roscommon; Replay | RTÉ |
All-Ireland Football Semi-finals
| 20 August | Mayo v Kerry | RTÉ & Sky Sports |
| 26 August | Mayo v Kerry; Replay | RTÉ & Sky Sports |
| 27 August | Dublin v Tyrone | RTÉ & Sky Sports |
All-Ireland Football Final
| 17 September | Dublin v Mayo | RTÉ & Sky Sports |

== Awards ==
=== The Sunday Game Team of the Year ===
The Sunday Game team of the year was picked on 17 September, the night of the final. Dublin's James McCarthy was named as The Sunday Game player of the year.

1. Stephen Cluxton (Dublin)
2. Mick Fitzsimons (Dublin)
3. Chris Barrett (Mayo)
4. Keith Higgins (Mayo)
5. Colm Boyle (Mayo)
6. Cian O'Sullivan (Dublin)
7. Jack McCaffrey (Dublin)
8. Tom Parsons (Mayo)
9. James McCarthy (Dublin)
10. Kevin McLoughlin (Mayo)
11. Aidan O'Shea (Mayo)
12. Con O'Callaghan (Dublin)
13. Paul Mannion (Dublin)
14. Paul Geaney (Kerry)
15. Andy Moran (Mayo)

=== All Star Team of the Year ===
Nominations were revealed on 21 September 2017. The football All Stars were revealed on 3 November 2017. Andy Moran was announced as player of the year and Con O'Callaghan as young player of the year.

1. David Clarke
2. Chris Barrett
3. Michael Fitzsimmons
4. Keith Higgins
5. Colm Boyle
6. Cian O'Sullivan
7. Jack McCaffrey
8. Colm Cavanagh
9. James McCarthy
10. Dean Rock
11. Aidan O'Shea
12. Ciaran Kilkenny
13. Paul Mannion
14. Paul Geaney
15. Andy Moran

Nominated Players

GOALKEEPERS

Stephen Cluxton (Dublin), David Clarke (Mayo), Niall Morgan (Tyrone)

DEFENDERS

Jack McCaffrey, Cian O’Sullivan, Michael Fitzsimons, Philip McMahon, John Small, Jonny Cooper (Dublin), Keith Higgins, Lee Keegan, Chris Barrett, Colm Boyle, Brendan Harrison (Mayo), Pádraig Hampsey, Tiernan McCann (Tyrone), Paul Murphy, Tadhg Morley (Kerry), Conor Devanney (Roscommon), Caolan Mooney (Down), Fintan Kelly (Monaghan).

MIDFIELDERS

James McCarthy, Brian Fenton (Dublin), Tom Parsons (Mayo), Colm Cavanagh (Tyrone), Enda Smith (Roscommon), Kevin Feely (Kildare).

FORWARDS

Andy Moran, Kevin McLoughlin, Aidan O’Shea, Jason Doherty, Cillian O’Connor (Mayo), Ciarán Kilkenny, Con O’Callaghan, Paul Mannion, Dean Rock (Dublin), Paul Geaney, Kieran Donaghy, James O’Donoghue (Kerry), Peter Harte, Niall Sludden (Tyrone), Connaire Harrison (Down), Patrick McBrearty (Donegal), Jamie Clarke (Armagh), Daniel Fly
