= 2016 Leinster Senior Football Championship =

2016 Leinster SFC
Tournament details
- Year: 2016

Winners
- Champions: Dublin (55th win)
- Manager: Jim Gavin
- Captain: Stephen Cluxton

Runners-up
- Runners-up: Westmeath
- Manager: Tom Cribbin
- Captain: Ger Egan

The 2016 Leinster Senior Football Championship was the 2016 installment of the annual Leinster Senior Football Championship held under the auspices of Leinster GAA. The competition ran from 14 May 2016 to 17 July 2016.

Dublin came into the competition as the defending champions, having won their 54th title and completed a 5-in-a-row the previous season. The draw for the championship was made on 16 October 2015. As in the previous two seasons, the two sides were named as A and B, to allow for teams to more easily predict the dates of their qualifier matches. Carlow, Dublin, Laois, Louth, Meath and Wicklow were named to the A side, with Kildare, Longford, Offaly, Westmeath and Wexford on the B side.

The final was a replay of the previous year's decider, with Dublin facing Westmeath. Dublin won 2–19 to 0–10 in the final at Croke Park, the county's first six-in-a-row since the 1970s.

== Teams ==
The Leinster championship was contested by 11 of the 12 county teams in Leinster, a province of Ireland. Kilkenny was the only county team not to compete.

Team	Colours	Sponsor	Manager	Captain	Most recent success
Team	Colours	Sponsor	Manager	Captain	All-Ireland	Provincial
Carlow	Red, green and gold	Tickets.ie	Turlough O'Brien	Darragh Foley		1944
Dublin	Sky blue and navy	American International Group	Jim Gavin	Stephen Cluxton	2015	2015
Kildare	White	Brady Family Ham	Cian O'Neill	Eoin Doyle	1928	2000
Laois	Blue and white	MW Hire Services	Mick Lillis	Donal Kingston		2003
Longford	Royal blue and gold	Glennon Brothers	Denis Connerton	Mickey Quinn		1968
Louth	Red and white	Morgan Fuels	Colin Kelly	Pádraig Rath	1957	1957
Meath	Green and gold	Tayto Park	Mick O'Dowd	Donal Keogan	1999	2010
Offaly	White, green and gold	Carroll's Cuisine	Pat Flanagan	Alan Mulhall	1982	1997
Westmeath	Maroon and white	Renault	Tom Cribbin	Ger Egan		2004
Wexford	Purple and gold	Gain Feeds	David Power	Graeme Molloy	1918	1945
Wicklow	Blue and gold	Arklow Bay Hotel	Johnny Magee	Rory Finn

== Bracket ==
Preliminary round
Laois	3-16
Wicklow	0-18
Louth	2-24
Carlow	3-11
Longford	2-13
Offaly	2-21

Quarter-finals
Laois	2-10
Dublin	2-21
Louth	1-13
Meath	0-20
Offaly	0-12
Westmeath	0-13
Wexford	0-8
Kildare	0-9

Semi-finals
Dublin	0-21
Meath	0-11
Westmeath	1-12
Kildare	1-11

Final
Dublin	2-19
Westmeath	0-10

Preliminary round refs Quarter-final refs

=== Preliminary round ===
14 May 2016
19:00
Preliminary round

Laois	3-16 – 0-18	Wicklow
D Kingston (1-6), G Walsh (1-1), E O'Carroll (0-4), R O'Connor (1-0), R Munnelly (0-2), P Cahillane, G Dillon, J O'Loughlin (0-1 each)	Report	R Finn (0-6), P Cunningham, D Healy, J McGrath (0-2 each), P Byrne, J Crowe, D Hayden, A McLoughlin, P McLoughlin, A Murphy (0-1 each)

O'Moore Park, Portlaoise
Attendance: 4,575
Referee: Fergal Kelly (Longford)
14 May 2016
17:00
Preliminary round

Louth	2-24 – 3-11	Carlow
R Burns (1-7), J Califf (0-5), A Williams (1-0), J McEneaney (0-3), D Byrne, C Grimes, D Maguire (0-2 each), R Holcroft, G McSorley, J Stewart (0-1 each)	Report	D Foley (0-5), P Broderick (1-1), C Blake, D O'Brien (1-0 each), B Murphy (0-2), S Gannon, B Kavanagh, J Murphy (0-1 each)

O'Moore Park, Portlaoise
Attendance: 4,575
Referee: Noel Mooney (Cavan)
15 May 2016
15:30
Preliminary round

Offaly	2-21 – 2-13	Longford
N Smith (1-1), B Allen, N Dunne, N McNamee (0-4 each), G Guilfoyle (1-0), P Cunningham, A Sullivan (0-2 each), M Brazil, E Carroll, J Moloney, J O’Connor (0-1 each)	Report	R Smyth (1-5), B McKeon (1-1), J McGivney (0-4), D Gallagher, M Quinn, CP Smyth (0-1 each)

O'Connor Park, Tullamore
Attendance: 5,023
Referee: Anthony Nolan (Wicklow)

=== Quarter-finals ===
21 May 2016; 17:15; Quarter-final	Kildare	0-9 - 0-8	Wexford	Croke Park; Attendance: 13,066; Referee: Rory Hickey (Clare)
21 May 2016; 17:15; Quarter-final	Neil Flynn 0-3, Alan Smith 0-2, Ollie Lyons, Morgan O'Flaherty, Cian O’Donoghue, Eamonn Callaghan 0-1 each	Report	Donal Shanley 0-4f, Colm Kehoe, Kevin O’Grady, John Tubritt, Shane Roche 0-1 each	Croke Park; Attendance: 13,066; Referee: Rory Hickey (Clare)

4 June 2016; 19:00; Quarter-final	Dublin	2-21 - 2-10	Laois	Nowlan Park; Attendance: 16,764; Referee: Ciaran Branagan (Down); Man of the Match: Diarmuid Connolly (St Vincent's)
4 June 2016; 19:00; Quarter-final	Dean Rock 1-10 (0-6f), Diarmuid Connolly 1-4, Ciarán Kilkenny 0-4, David Byrne, Kevin McManamon, Con O'Callaghan 0-1 each	Report	Paul Cahillane 1-2 (1-0 pen, 0-2f), Stephen Attride 1-0, Donal Kingston 0-2 (0-1f), Gay Walsh, John O'Loughlin, Kevin Meaney, Ross Munnelly, Darren Strong, Damien O'Connor 0-1 each	Nowlan Park; Attendance: 16,764; Referee: Ciaran Branagan (Down); Man of the Match: Diarmuid Connolly (St Vincent's)

12 June 2016; 15:30; Quarter-final	Louth	1-13 – 0-20	Meath	Parnell Park; Attendance: 8,500; Referee: Pádraig Hughes (Armagh)
12 June 2016; 15:30; Quarter-final	Ryan Burns, James Califf (0-4 each), Jim McEneaney (1-0), Declan Byrne, Anthony Williams 0-2 each, Bevan Duffy (0-1)	Report	Michael Newman 0-7, Eamonn Wallace 0-4, Graham Reilly, Andrew Tormey 0-3 each, Cillian O'Sullivan 0-2 Conor O'Brien 0-1	Parnell Park; Attendance: 8,500; Referee: Pádraig Hughes (Armagh)

12 June 2016; 15:00; Quarter-final	Westmeath	0-13 - 0-12	Offaly	Cusack Park, Mullingar; Attendance: 8,123; Referee: Padraig O'Sullivan (Kerry); Man of the Match: James Dolan (Garrycastle)
12 June 2016; 15:00; Quarter-final	John Heslin 0-5 (0-2f), John Connellan 0-3, Paul Sharry 0-2 (1 '45), James Dolan, Denis Corroon, Kieran Martin 0-1 each	Report	Nigel Dunne 0-6 (0-5f), Peter Cunningham 0-2, Graham Guilfoyle, Bernard Allen, Niall McNamee, Johnny Moloney 0-1 each	Cusack Park, Mullingar; Attendance: 8,123; Referee: Padraig O'Sullivan (Kerry); Man of the Match: James Dolan (Garrycastle)

=== Semi-finals ===
26 June 2016; 16:15; Semi-final	Westmeath	1-12 – 1-11	Kildare	Croke Park; Attendance: 42,259; Referee: Derek O'Mahony (Tipperary); Man of the Match: Ger Egan (Tyrrellspass)
26 June 2016; 16:15; Semi-final	John Heslin 0-4f, James Dolan 1-0, Paul Sharry 0-3 (1 '45), Ray Connellan and Kieran Martin 0-2 each, Callum McCormack 0-1	Report	Neil Flynn 0-4f, Tommy Moolick 1-0, Emmet Bolton 0-2, Johnny Byrne, Fergal Conway, Adam Tyrrell, Eoghan O'Flaherty, Niall Kelly 0-1 each	Croke Park; Attendance: 42,259; Referee: Derek O'Mahony (Tipperary); Man of the Match: Ger Egan (Tyrrellspass)

26 June 2016; 18:35; Semi-final	Dublin	0-21 – 0-11	Meath	Croke Park; Attendance: 42,259; Referee: Rory Hickey (Clare); Man of the Match: Diarmuid Connolly (St Vincent's)
26 June 2016; 18:35; Semi-final	Dean Rock 0-10 (0-9f), Diarmuid Connolly 0-4, Bernard Brogan 0-3, Paul Flynn 0-2, Brian Fenton and Paul Mannion 0-1 each	Report	Michael Newman 0-4, Graham Reilly 0-3, Cillian O'Sullivan 0-2 (0-1f), Eamonn Wallace and Ronan Jones 0-1 each	Croke Park; Attendance: 42,259; Referee: Rory Hickey (Clare); Man of the Match: Diarmuid Connolly (St Vincent's)

=== Final ===
17 July 2016; 4:00 pm Final	Dublin	2-19 – 0-10	Westmeath	Croke Park, Dublin; Attendance: 38,885; Referee: Fergal Kelly (Longford); Man of the Match: Bernard Brogan (St Oliver Plunketts/ER)
17 July 2016; 4:00 pm Final	Dean Rock 0-8f, Bernard Brogan 1-4, Kevin McManamon 1-2, Paddy Andrews 0-2, John Small, Paul Flynn, Diarmuid Connolly 0-1 each	Report	John Heslin 0-6 (0-5f), Ger Egan 0-2, Denis Corroon and Callum McCormack 0-1 each	Croke Park, Dublin; Attendance: 38,885; Referee: Fergal Kelly (Longford); Man of the Match: Bernard Brogan (St Oliver Plunketts/ER)

== See also ==
- 2016 All-Ireland Senior Football Championship
  - 2016 Connacht Senior Football Championship
  - 2016 Munster Senior Football Championship
  - 2016 Ulster Senior Football Championship
