= Kevin Leahy (Gaelic footballer) =

Irish Gaelic footballer

Personal information
- Native name: Caoimhín Ó Laocha (Irish)
- Born: Dublin, Ireland

Sport
- Sport: Gaelic football
- Position: Left Half Forward
Club
- Years: Club
- 2007–: Ballymun Kickhams
Club titles
- Dublin titles: 1
Inter-county
- Years: County
- 2007: Dublin

Kevin Leahy is a Gaelic footballer who plays for the Ballymun Kickhams club and, formerly, for the Dublin junior team.

== Playing career ==
Leahy opened his 2007 Junior campaign with Dublin by scoring a total of 0-10 (0-9f) against Louth in the quarter final of the Leinster Junior Football Championship. Dublin then progressed to the semi-final against neighbours Wicklow. Leahy continued with his impressive scoring for Dublin by getting 0-8 (0-3f, 0-1 '45'). This leaves him with a total of 0-18 (0-12f, 0-1 '45') in the 2007 Junior championship. Dublin meet Wexford in the final as they beat last years champions Meath by 2-14 to 2-09. Leahy continued with his scoring but his four points weren't enough to seal the victory against Wexford in the final. Wexford beat Dublin by 1-10 to 1-08 at Wexford Park.

Kevin won the 2012 Dublin Senior Football Championship with Ballymun Kickhams against Kilmacud Crokes at Parnell Park.
