= Gerry McCaul =

Irish Gaelic footballer and manager

Personal information
- Native name: Gearóid Mac Camhaoil (Irish)
- Nickname: Mac/The Tank
- Born: Cremartin, Monaghan, Ireland
- Occupation: School principal

Sport
- Sport: Gaelic football
- Position: Corner Back
Club
- Years: Club
- ?–?: Ballymun Kickhams
Inter-county
- Years: County
- ?–?: Dublin

Gerry McCaul is a former Gaelic football manager and player who spent time in both roles with the senior Dublin county team. Before being appointed as manager of Dublin, McCaul had been the player-manager of Dublin club Ballymun Kickhams. He is the brother of former Dublin player Anto McCaul, who also played with Ballymun Kickhams. Gerry also played at UCD with players such as Gerry McEntee.

He is a secondary school principal.

Sporting positions
Preceded by Brian Mullins; Robbie Kelleher; Seán Doherty	Dublin Senior Football Manager; 1986–1990	Succeeded by Paddy Cullen
