= Brendan Hackett =

Irish Gaelic football manager and sports psychologist

Personal information
- Native name: Breandán Ó hAicéad (Irish)
- Born: 1960/1
- Occupation: Sports psychologist

Sport
Inter-county management
- Years: Team
- 1987–1990 1990–1992 2009–2010: Longford; Offaly; Westmeath

Brendan Hackett (born c.1960) is a Gaelic football manager, sports psychologist and former chief executive officer of Athletics Ireland. As of 2022, he was manager of Ballymun Kickhams. He previously managed the Longford, Offaly and Westmeath county teams during the 1980s, 1990s, 2000s and 2010s. He has also trained the Ireland international rules football team and worked with numerous county teams as a psychologist during the 21st century.

== Career ==
Hackett's first management role was Limerick's Thomond College at the age of 20 (1981–1983). As manager of Leixlip (1983–1985), one of his players was Jack O'Shea.

Hackett managed Longford's senior footballers between 1987 and 1990, taking the role at the age of 26. Longford made the 1988 Leinster Senior Football Championship semi-finals and also two quarter-finals of the National Football League. He trained Ireland for the 1990 International Rules Series. He managed Offaly's senior footballers between 1990 and 1992.

The GAA gave him a postgraduate scholarship in 1992, which Hackett used to obtain an MA in Sports Psychology from the University of Limerick. He coached middle-distance runners Noel Cullen and James Nolan. He also worked as a sports psychologist with Team Ireland's boxers and sailors at the 2004 Summer Olympics. He also had involvement with other Irish Olympic teams. He worked as a psychologist with Roscommon (2001), Sligo (2002), Fermanagh (2003), Limerick (2004), Monaghan (2006) and Wexford (2007). In the midst of this, Hackett was chief executive officer of Athletics Ireland from October 2005 until his resignation in January 2008.

Westmeath GAA, searching for a manager after the resignation of Tomás Ó Flatharta, appointed Hackett as senior and under-21 football manager in September 2009, with the choice of someone who had not managed at that level for many years seen as unexpected. Hackett included Michael Carruth as a masseur and Eoin Rheinisch as part of "physical preparations" on his backroom team. Westmeath embarked on a second successive league campaign without winning a game and were relegated to Division 3 of the National Football League. Hackett resigned in April 2010. He did not contest a single championship match.

Hackett later managed the Kildare minor football team, where his players included the actor Paul Mescal. He then assisted the Down senior football team as a psychologist.

As the COVID-19 pandemic emerged in 2020, Hackett was managing the Ballymun Kickhams footballers. He led that club to the 2020 Dublin Senior Football Championship.

In 2022, still managing Ballymun, Hackett was reported to have been interviewed for the Monaghan senior football team's managerial vacancy that arose following Séamus McEnaney's departure.

== Personal life ==
Hackett is originally from Monaghan. He is a member of the Donore Harriers athletics club in Dublin.

Sporting positions
Preceded by	Longford Senior Football Manager; 1987–90	Succeeded by
Preceded by Jody Gunning	Offaly Senior Football Manager; 1990–92	Succeeded by Pat Fitzgerald
Preceded by Tomás Ó Flatharta	Westmeath Senior Football Manager; 2009–10	Succeeded by Pat Flanagan
