= Ballymun Kickhams GAA =

Gaelic games club in Ballymun, Dublin, Ireland

Ballymun Kickhams
- Ciceam Bhaile Munna
- Founded: 1969
- County: Dublin
- Nickname: The Mun, The Ballymun
- Colours: Red and Green
- Grounds: Pairc Ciceam
- Coordinates: 53°25′00.61″N 6°15′53.49″W

Playing kits
Standard colours

Senior Club Championships
	All Ireland	Leinster champions	Dublin champions
Football:	-	1	4

Ballymun Kickhams (Irish: Ciceam Bhaile Munna ) is a GAA club in Ballymun, Dublin, Ireland. The club has a clubhouse and its home pitch, Pairc Ciceam, just off the Ballymun (junction 4) exit of the M50. Ballymun also has a full size astroturf pitch. The club derives its name from Charles Joseph Kickham (1828–1882). They last won the Dublin Senior Football Championship in 2020.

== History ==
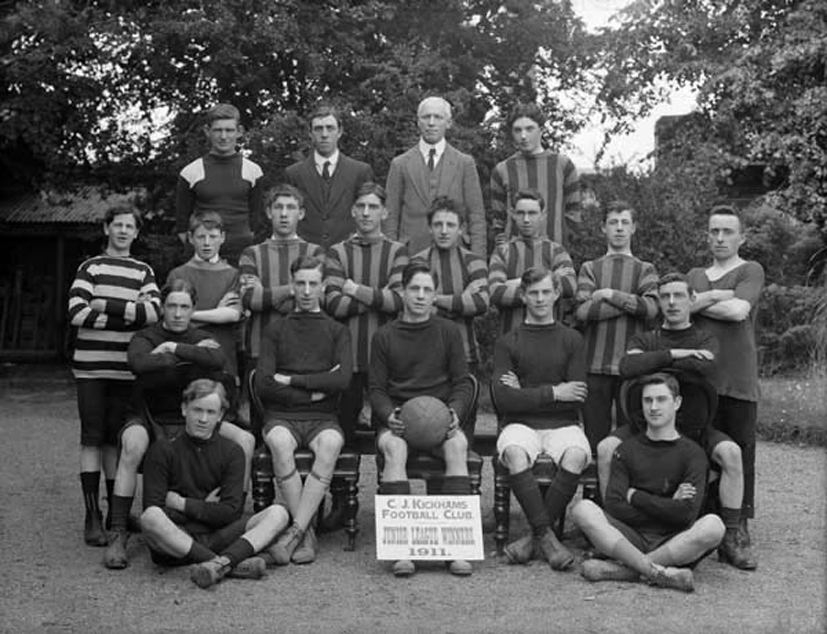
C.J. Kickham's GAA Football Club, predecessor of the current club, pictured in August 1912

The club was set up in 1969 following the merging of two clubs, Ballymun Gaels and C.J. Kickhams. Senior status was first achieved in 1978 when Ballymun Kickhams beat Fingal Ravens in the Intermediate league final. In 1981 Ballymun made it to their first Dublin Senior Football Championship Final. The club's Intermediate team participated in the 2010 RTÉ series Celebrity Bainisteoir, with Today FM's Maireád Farrell.

Ballymun Kickhams won their first Dublin Football Championship in 1982, won their second in 1985 before claiming their third in 2012. Ballymun claimed the Division 1 league title in 1983, 1984, 1987, 1988 and, most recently, in 2009. On Sunday 9 December 2012, Ballymun Kickhams won their first Leinster Senior Football Final, defeating Portlaoise, in Mullingar.

In 2011, the U14 Ballymun Kickhams team won the All Ireland Division 1 Féile for the first time in the club's history.

In March 2013, Ballymun Kickhams reached the All-Ireland Senior Club Football Final, a game which Roscommon GAA club St Brigid's won.

In 2015, the Ballymun minor team, managed by former Dublin senior footballer, Paddy Christie, won a historic treble. They won the Minor 'A' Football Championship, Division 1 League Title and Leinster Minor Football Championship.

As the COVID-19 pandemic emerged in 2020, Brendan Hackett was Ballymun Kickhams coach. He led the club to the 2020 Dublin Senior Football Championship. As of 2022, Hackett was still managing the club.

== Notable players ==
- Paddy Christie
- Evan Comerford
- Dermot Deasy
- Gerry Hargan
- Kevin Leahy
- James McCarthy
- John McCarthy
- Gerry McCaul
- Philly McMahon
- Ian Robertson
- Barney Rock
- Dean Rock
- John Small
- Paddy Small

== Notable managers ==
Notable former managers at the club include:

- Paul Curran, c. 2011–2014
- Paddy Carr, c. 2016–2017
- Brendan Hackett, c. 2018–2022

== Honours ==
- All-Ireland Senior Club Football Championship (0): (runner-up in 2013)
- Leinster Senior Club Football Championship (1): 2012-13 (runner-up in 1982-83)
- Dublin Senior Football Championship (4): 1982, 1985, 2012, 2020
- Dublin AFL Division 1 (6): 1983, 1984, 1987, 1988, 2009, 2019
- Dublin Intermediate Football Championship (1): 1979
- Dublin Junior B Football Championship (1): 2016
- Dublin Under 21 A Football Championship (6): 1990, 1991, 1996, 2007, 2008, 2018
- Dublin Under 21 B Football Championship (1): 2013
- Dublin Minor A Football Championship (5): 1951, 1952, 1953 (as Kickhams), 1977, 2015
- Dublin AFL Div. 4 (1): 2014
- Dublin AFL Div. 6 (1): 2017
