= Dean Rock =

Irish Gaelic footballer (born 1990)

Personal information
- Born: 26 February 1990 (age 36) Ballymun, Dublin, Ireland
- Occupations: Fundraising & communications manager
- Height: 1.85 m (6 ft 1 in)

Sport
- Sport: Gaelic football
- Position: Left corner-forward
Club
- Years: Club
- 2007–: Ballymun Kickhams
Club titles
- Dublin titles: 2
- Leinster titles: 1
College
- Years: College
- 2011–2014: Dublin City University
College titles
- Sigerson titles: 1
Inter-county*
Years	County	Apps (scores)
2013-2023	Dublin	53 (11–253)
Inter-county titles
- Leinster titles: 12
- All-Irelands: 8
- NFL: 6
- All Stars: 3
- *Inter County team apps and scores correct as of 22:43, 2 September 2021 (UTC).

Dean Rock (born 26 February 1990) is an Irish Gaelic footballer who was a senior member of the Dublin county team from 2013 to 2023.

He has represented Dublin at all grades, Minor, Junior, U21 and Senior. He is a noted free taker and scored the winning point from a free in the 2017 All-Ireland Senior Football Championship Final. Colm O'Rourke has described Rock as "statistically the best free taker that has been to Croke Park".

== Early life ==
Born in Ballymadun, Garristown, Rock was born into a family with a strong association with Gaelic football. His great-grandfather, grandfather and granduncle all worked as groundsmen at Croke Park, while his father, Barney Rock, is an All-Ireland medal winner with Dublin.

== Playing career ==
=== Secondary school ===
Rock attended the Catholic University School where he played rugby union in the absence of a Gaelic football team.

=== Club ===
He simultaneously came to prominence at juvenile and underage levels with the Ballymun Kickhams club before making his debut with the senior team in 2008. Since then he has won one Leinster medal and two county senior championship medals.

=== Inter-county ===
==== Minor and under-21 ====
Rock made his debut on the inter-county scene when he was selected for the Dublin minor team. After an unsuccessful tenure with the minor team, he later won an All-Ireland medal as part of the Dublin under-21 team.

==== Junior ====
Dean Rock represented Dublin at Junior level in the 2009 Leinster Junior Football Championship. Dublin were knocked out in the semi-final by Louth. Dean Rock scored a total of 14 points for Dublin in his two appearances for Dublin Juniors.

==== Senior ====
Rock made his senior debut during the 2012 league when he was introduced as a substitute against Donegal in March. He made his championship debut the following year against Westmeath. Since then he has won six All-Ireland medals, beginning with his first title in 2013 and followed by five successive championships from 2015 to 2019. Rock has also won six Leinster medals and five National League medals. Rock has been awarded two All Star awards for Dublin in 2017 and 2016, when he finished the season as top scorer of the All-Ireland Senior Football Championship.

Rock only started his first league match for Dublin in 2015, after which he participated in 63 consecutive league and championship games.

He is noted for his taking Dublin's frees, while attaining hitherto unimaginable levels of accuracy. Having spent to years as a substitute in 2013 and 2014, he studied placed-ball kicking and worked kicking expert Dave Alred, as he revealed in 2017.

In the 2016 All-Ireland Senior Football Championship Final replay defeat of Mayo, Rock scored 0–9 (including seven frees).

In the 2017 All-Ireland Senior Football Championship Final defeat of Mayo, Rock scored 0–7 (including three frees), including the late winner through Lee Keegan's thrown GPS pack.

In the 2018 All-Ireland Senior Football Championship Final defeat of Tyrone, Rock also scored 0–7 (including four frees).

Rock's fifth point of the drawn 2019 All-Ireland Senior Football Championship Final (which gave Dublin a lead of 1–7 to 0–6) was his 411th point for his county in league and championship in his 88th game. Combined with his 14 Dublin goals, Rock passed Bernard Brogan the Second to become the second highest scorer ever in Dublin football. Unusually, Rock has done this mostly through points; he has the lowest goal-scoring record among the top ten (with only Charlie Redmond's 15 goals within reach) and achieved the feat while making fewer appearances than those around him in the all-time list.

Rock holds the record for the fastest goal scored in the history of All-Ireland SFC finals, after sending the ball past David Clarke directly from the throw-in of the 2020 final, breaking Kerryman Garry McMahon's record which had stood since the 1962 final.

On 16 January 2024, Rock announced his retirement from inter-county football.

== Post-playing career ==
After retiring from inter-county football, Rock contributed to the GAAGO podcast

In September 2025, it was announced that Rock would be joining the backroom team of the recently appointed Dublin senior manager Ger Brennan.

== Career statistics ==
As of match played 14 August 2021.

Appearances and scores by team, season and competition
Team	Season	National League			Leinster		All-Ireland		Total	
Team	Season	Division	Apps	Score	Apps	Score	Apps	Score	Apps	Score
Dublin	2013	Division 1	2	0–2	3	0–6	3	0–4	8	0–12
Dublin	2014	Division 1	0	0–0	3	0–8	2	0–2	5	0–10
Dublin	2015	Division 1	9	1–52	3	2–12	4	0–11	16	3–75
Dublin	2016	Division 1	9	1–40	3	1–28	4	0–30	16	2–98
Dublin	2017	Division 1	8	0–48	3	2–11	3	1–20	14	3–79
Dublin	2018	Division 1	8	1–32	3	2–16	4	0–25	15	3–73
Dublin	2019	Division 1	7	2–32	1	0–4	5	1–35	13	3–71
Dublin	2020	Division 1	7	3–37	3	1–16	2	1–10	12	5–63
Dublin	2021	Division 1	0	0–0	3	0–8	1	0–7	4	0–15
Dublin	2022	Division 1	3	0–12	0	0–0	0	0–0	3	0–12
Total			53	8–255	25	8–109	28	3–144	106	19–508

== Personal life ==
Rock is married to Niamh McEvoy, the Dublin senior ladies' footballer. They have a daughter called Sadie Rose Rock and live in McEvoy's home town, the affluent Dublin suburb Malahide.

Following the completion of the five-in-row in 2019, Rock spent a week in New York with Ciarán Kilkenny and Paddy Andrews.

He debuted the "Dean Rock Free Taking Project" in mid-2020.

== Honours ==
Dublin City University

- Sigerson Cup (1): 2012

Ballymun Kickhams

- Leinster Senior Club Football Championship (1): 2012
- Dublin Senior Football Championship (2): 2012, 2020

Dublin

- All-Ireland Senior Football Championship (8): 2013, 2015, 2016, 2017, 2018, 2019, 2020, 2023
- Leinster Senior Football Championship (10): 2013, 2014, 2015, 2016, 2017, 2018, 2019, 2020, 2021, 2022
- National Football League (5): 2013, 2014, 2015, 2016, 2018, 2021
- All-Ireland Under-21 Football Championship (1): 2010
- Leinster Under-21 Football Championship (2): 2009, 2010

Individual

- GAA-GPA All Stars Awards (3): 2016, 2017, 2020
