= Ger Egan =

Westmeath Gaelic footballer

Personal information
- Born: 1990/1991

Sport
- Sport: Gaelic football
Club
- Years: Club
- 2008–: Tyrrellspass
College
- Years: College
- Athlone IT
Inter-county
- Years: County
- 2010–2022: Westmeath

Ger Egan (born 1990/1991) is a Gaelic footballer who plays for Tyrrellspass and at senior level for the Westmeath county team.

His uncle Joe Hyland was a goalkeeper for Tyrrellspass, who was part of the team that won the 1999 Westmeath Senior Football Championship. Egan got involved in the senior setup at his club in 2007 when he was 16 years of age and when Pat Flanagan was manager, but he was too young to play at the time. He started playing for the Tyrellspass senior team in 2008.

He played in the 2015 Leinster Senior Football Championship final.

He played in the 2016 Leinster Senior Football Championship final.

He was a crucial part of the team, scoring 1–5 (1–4 from open play) to defeat Dublin at Parnell Park, that won the 2019 O'Byrne Cup, his county's first time to win that trophy since 1988. He won his second piece of silverware of 2019 when Westmeath won the 2019 National Football League Division 3 league title by a goal against Laois at Croke Park, Egan scored 1–7 including the crucial goal in 60 minutes. He was named the Man of the Match in that game.

Egan tore his cruciate ligament in a game against Clare in 2019, and underwent surgery on it.

He returned to become part of the Westmeath side that won the 2022 Tailteann Cup, and played in the final.

== Honours ==
Westmeath

- Tailteann Cup (1): 2022
- National Football League Division 3 (1): 2019
- O'Byrne Cup (1): 2019
