= St Kevin's GAA =

Gaelic games club in County Kildare, Ireland

St Kevin's
- Naomh Caoimhín
- Founded: 1945
- County: Kildare
- Colours: Red and black
- Grounds: Staplestown
- Coordinates: 53.33094°N 6.75919°W

Playing kits
Standard colours

St Kevin's is a Gaelic Athletic Association (GAA) club in the Kildare GAA based in Staplestown in North County Kildare, Ireland.

== History ==
The club was founded in 1945 under the name Staplestown GFC. The original colours were green white and gold and remained so until 1963 when the club added St. Kevin's to the Staplestown name and changed their colour to black and red. The name refers to Saint Kevin of Glendalough. Various locations were used for matches until the present grounds were acquired in 1961. The dressing rooms were built in 1982 and the ground was named the Jack Casey Memorial Park in memory of the club secretary who had been so instrumental in purchasing the pitch originally. The bar and hall were added in later years.

The first official match played by the club was a junior league game against Caragh in Prosperous in March 1946 losing out by 3–4 to 1–3. It took until the third round of the league to gain the first win, defeating another newly formed club Firmount 1–3 to 1–2 which was played in Allen. In their first ever championship match they defeated Rathcoffey 1–2 to 1–1 but lost to Straffan in the second round.

A lean few years followed until 1966 when they contested the junior league final, the first ever final contested by the club, but were beaten by a point by Milltown.

In the 1970s, the club went from Junior B to Senior grade. In that period, the club contested two Junior B finals, two Jack Higgins Cup finals, a division 3 senior league final, a division 2 senior league final and two junior league division 2 finals. The Junior B championship was won in 1972 when they defeated Raheens, the first ever championship win for the club. The Junior A championship was won in 1976 when they defeated Leixlip. The intermediate final was contested for the first time in 1978 but was lost by a point. The intermediate championship crown was secured in 1979 when they defeated St. Laurence's in the final. The senior league division 3 crown was also won in 1973 by going through the entire campaign unbeaten. Although they lost the division 2 final, promotion to division 1 was won for the first time in 1980. Another Division 2 final defeat came in 1982. The club played in the senior championship from 1980 to 1990, reaching the semi-final in 1984 where they were beaten by five points by eventual winners Clane.

During the 1990s, the club unsuccessfully contested four intermediate finals: from 1995 to 1999. In 1995, they lost to local rivals Caragh. They came back again the following year only to lose the final after a replay by a point to Eadestown. Two years later, they again reached the intermediate final only to lose to Kilcullen this time. The following year they lost to Maynooth by a point, yet again after a replay. Some consolidation could be taken during the 1990s as the division 3 title was won in 1997.

In 2004, the club secured the division 3 title. However two more intermediate final defeats came in 2004 and 2005. In 2004, they lost to Maynooth again in the final. The following year, Confey beat them in the intermediate final. While they lead Confey by 1–2 to 0–0 after 10 minutes, they "faded badly" and Confey won by two points. Confey went on to win the Leinster intermediate championship.

However, they beat Maynooth in the Division 2 final by 0–15 to 0–7 in 2008. The intermediate championship title was finally won in 2008. They played Monasterevan in the final having lost in the group stage already to Monasterevan in the group stage. The first final was to prove a tense affair with Monaterevan leading throughout. With one minute left, Kevin's were down by 4 points but a goal was scored before they equalised deep into injury time. It finished 1–8 apiece. The replay was to prove a rather one sided affair with Kevin's winning out 2–9 to 0–6.

All of the players who play hurling play for Coill Dubh as they are in the same parish. Coill Dubh in return provides a lot of players for St. Kevin's.

== Honours ==
- Kildare Intermediate Football Championship: (2) 1979, 2008
- Kildare Intermediate Football Championship: Runner-up 2006, 2005, 1999, 1998, 1996, 1995, 1978
- Kildare Junior A Football Championship: (1) 1976
- Kildare Junior B Football Championship (1) 1972
- Kildare Senior Football League Division 2: 2008, 2017
- Kildare Senior Football League Division 3: (2) 1997, 2004
- Kildare Senior Football Championship: Semi-finalists 1984

== Bibliography ==
- Kildare GAA: A Centenary History, by Eoghan Corry, CLG Chill Dara, 1984, ISBN 0-9509370-0-2 hb ISBN 0-9509370-1-0 pb
- Kildare GAA yearbook, 1972, 1974, 1978, 1979, 1980 and 2000– in sequence especially the Millennium yearbook of 2000
- Soaring Sliothars: Centenary of Kildare Camogie 1904–2004 by Joan O'Flynn Kildare County Camogie Board.
