= Staplestown =

Village in County Kildare, Ireland

Coordinates: 53.3301°N 6.7666°W

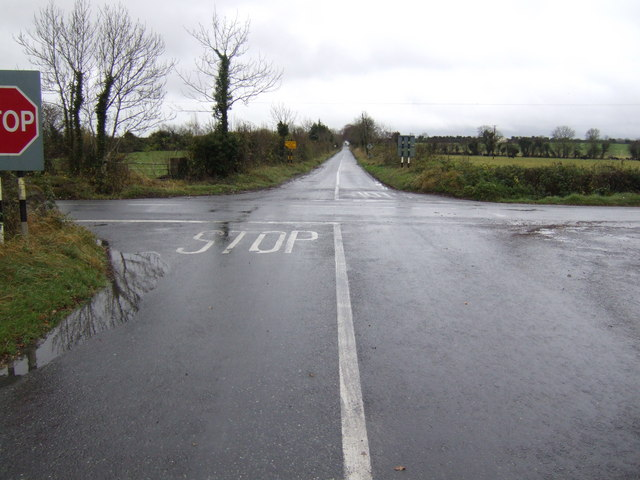
Staplestown cross roads

Staplestown (Irish: Baile an Stáibléaraigh) is a village and townland in north County Kildare, Ireland, located 40 kilometres west of Dublin. The village has a church, a school and is home to St Kevin's GAA. The local national (primary) school is Scoil Naomh Mhuire National School.

The Roman Catholic church in Staplestown is dedicated to St. Benignus. It was built c. 1840, and is one of the oldest churches in the Kildare and Leighlin diocese. The church was built to a 'T-plan' and has three galleries. It was extended in the 1970s.

An old school, built c. 1870, is also on the grounds of the church. This was renovated in 2006 and is used as a town hall. A statue of Christ the King stands opposite the church, on the wall of Scoil Naomh Mhuire. There is also a church in Cooleragh, in Staplestown parish, called Christ the King.

Donadea Forest Park is located in the neighbouring civil parish of Donadea. The forest is managed by the state forestry agency, Coillte.

== See also ==
- List of towns and villages in Ireland
- History of County Kildare
