= 2020 Dublin Senior Football Championship =

Gaelic football tournament

Tournament details
- County: Dublin
- Year: 2020
- Trophy: Clerys Cup
- Date: July–October 2020
- Teams: 16 Senior 1; 16 Senior 2
- Defending champions: Ballyboden St Enda's

Winners
- Champions: Ballymun Kickhams
- Manager: Brendan Hackett
- Captain: James McCarthy
- Qualify for: Leinster Club SFC

Runners-up
- Runners-up: Ballyboden St Enda's
- Manager: Anthony Rainbow

Promotion/Relegation
- Promoted team(s): No promotion/relegation due to COVID-19 pandemic

Other
- Website: Dublin GAA.ie

The 2020 Dublin Senior Football Championship was the 134th edition of Dublin GAA's premier gaelic football tournament for senior clubs in County Dublin, Ireland. 32 teams participate (16 in Senior 1 and 16 in Senior 2), with the winner of Senior 1 representing Dublin in the Leinster Senior Club Football Championship.

Ballyboughal won the 2019 I.F.C. and were promoted along with I.F.C. finalists Trinity Gaels to Senior 2. They replaced St. Patrick's Palmerstown and Round Towers Clondalkin who were relegated to the 2020 I.F.C.

Round Towers Lusk won the Senior 2 Championship and were promoted along with finalists Whitehall Colmcille to Senior 1. They replaced St. Brigid's and St. Sylvester's who were relegated to the 2020 SFC2.

== Senior 1 ==
The team named first in Rounds 1 and 2 in each group will have home advantage. Round 3 will see teams play at neutral venues.

=== Group 1 ===
Team	Pld	W	L	D	PF	PA	PD	Pts
Ballymun Kickhams	3	3	0	0	86	33	+53	6
Skerries Harps	3	2	1	0	52	56	-4	4
Thomas Davis	3	1	2	0	41	51	-10	2
Round Towers Lusk	3	0	3	0	40	79	-39	0

Round 1

25 July 2020; 18:30	Ballymun Kickhams	3-18 - 0-12	Skerries Harps	Pairc Ciceam

25 July 2020; 18:30	Thomas Davis	2-14 - 0-11	Round Towers Lusk	Kiltipper Road
25 July 2020; 18:30	David Keogh and Conor Guilfoyle 1-0 each, Ryan Deegan, Eoin Kirby, Sean Farrelly, Mark Nolan, Paul Hudson 0-2 each, Sean Kennedy, Eoin Lambert, Adam Fallon, Josh Lambert 0-1 each	Report	Liam Bohan 0-6, Cormac Howley 0-4, Chris Tonge 0-1	Kiltipper Road

Round 2

5 August 2020; 19:30	Ballymun Kickhams	3-26 - 1-10	Round Towers Lusk	Lusk

5 August 2020; 19:30	Skerries Harps	3-7 - 1-10	Thomas Davis	Skerries

Round 3

15 August 2020; 17:30	Ballymun Kickhams	3-15 - 0-8	Thomas Davis	Parnell Park

15 August 2020; 17:30	Skerries Harps	3-15 - 2-10	Round Towers Lusk	Garristown

=== Group 2 ===
Team	Pld	W	L	D	PF	PA	PD	Pts
St Jude's	3	3	0	0	43	24	+19	6
Na Fianna	3	2	1	0	49	36	+13	4
Lucan Sarsfields	3	1	2	0	42	50	-8	2
Ballinteer St John's	3	0	3	0	25	49	-24	0

Round 1

25 July 2020; 18:30	Lucan Sarsfields	0-19 - 0-9	Ballinteer St John's	12th Lock; Referee: Ciaran Reilly (Na Fianna)
25 July 2020; 18:30	Brendan Gallagher 0-6 (0-2f), Emmett Ó Conghaile 0-3, Ciaran Dowling, Mark Lavin, Harry Ladd, Jordan Delmar 0-2 each, Sean Newcombe and Darren Gavin 0-1 each		Robbie Gaughan and Donnacha Carey (0-2f, 1 '45) 0-3 each, Aaron Bradshaw and Joe Sweeney 0-1 each	12th Lock; Referee: Ciaran Reilly (Na Fianna)

25 July 2020; 18:30	St Jude's	1-10 - 0-8	Na Fianna	Parnell Park
25 July 2020; 18:30	Niall Coakley 1-3 (0-2f), Brian Coakley 0-4 (0-1m, 1 '45), Tom Devlin 0-2, Tom Lahiff 0-1m	Report	Aaron Byrne 0-3f, Dean Ryan, Glenn O'Reilly, Paddy Quinn, Conor McHugh (0-1f), David Quinn 0-1 each	Parnell Park

Round 2

5 August 2020; 19:30	Na Fianna	1-22 - 1-12	Lucan Sarsfields	St Mobhi Road

5 August 2020; 19:30	St Jude's	0-14 - 0-8	Ballinteer St John's	Marlay Park

Round 3

15 August 2020; 16:00	St Jude's	2-10 - 0-8	Lucan Sarsfields	O'Toole Park

15 August 2020; 16:00	Na Fianna	2-10 - 0-8	Ballinteer St John's	Balgriffin

=== Group 3 ===
Team	Pld	W	L	D	PF	PA	PD	Pts
Ballyboden St. Enda's	3	3	0	0	92	47	+45	6
St Vincents	3	2	1	0	63	53	+10	4
Clontarf	3	1	2	0	46	69	-23	2
Whitehall Colmcille	3	0	3	0	44	76	-32	0

Round 1

25 July 2020; 18:30	Ballyboden St. Enda's	4-20 - 2-8	Clontarf	Páirc Uí Mhurchú; Referee: Dan Stynes (St Peregrines)
25 July 2020; 18:30	Colm Basquel 1-10 (1-0 pen, 0-5f), Warren Egan 2-0, Ross McGarry and Conal Keaney (0-1f) 0-4 each, Simon Lambert 1-0, Declan O'Mahoney and Tom Hayes 0-1 each	Report	Kevin Lillis 2-4 (0-2f), Nathan Doran 0-2 (0-1f), Morgan Walsh and Fiachra Dodd 0-1 each	Páirc Uí Mhurchú; Referee: Dan Stynes (St Peregrines)

25 July 2020; 18:30	St Vincents	2-15 - 1-13	Whitehall Colmcille	Collins Avenue
25 July 2020; 18:30	Tomás Quinn 1-8 (1-0 pen, 0-4f, 1 '45), Sean Lowry 1-1, Diarmuid Connolly (0-2f) and Shane B. Carthy 0-2 each, Liam McGovern and Greg Murphy 0-1 each	Report	Cormac Costello 1-8 (0-7f), Lee Gannon, Hugh McInerney, Keith Campbell, Eoghan O'Donnell, Peter Corry (0-1m) 0-1 each	Collins Avenue

Round 2

5 August 2020; 19:30	Clontarf	3-12 - 0-15	Whitehall Colmcille	St Anne's Park

5 August 2020; 19:30	Ballyboden St. Enda's	5-11 - 1-17	St Vincents	Páirc Naomh Uinsionn
5 August 2020; 19:30	Colm Basquel 2-3 (0-3f), Simon Lambert, Tom Hayes, Donogh McCabe 1-0 each, Warren Egan and Ross McGarry 0-2 each, Kieran Kennedy, Darren O'Reilly, Alan Flood, Conal Keaney 0-1 each	Report	Tomas Quinn 0-5 (0-4f), Shane B. Carthy 1-1, Diarmuid Connolly 0-4 (0-2f), Gavin Burke and Greg Murphy 0-3 each, Albert Martin 0-1	Páirc Naomh Uinsionn

Round 3

15 August 2020; 18:30	Ballyboden St. Enda's	4-22 - 1-10	Whitehall Colmcille	O'Toole Park

15 August 2020; 19:30	St Vincents	2-16 - 0-11	Clontarf	Parnell Park

=== Group 4 ===
Team	Pld	W	L	D	PF	PA	PD	Pts
Kilmacud Crokes	3	2	0	0	74	39	+35	6
Raheny	3	2	1	0	45	60	-15	4
Castleknock	3	1	2	0	46	44	+2	2
St Oliver Plunketts/ER	3	0	3	0	47	69	-22	0

Round 1

25 July 2020; 18:30	Castleknock	2-15 - 1-11	St Oliver Plunketts/ER	Somerton Park
25 July 2020; 18:30	Gerard McDermottroe 1-3 (1-0 pen), Conor Chawke 1-1, Tommy McDaniel 0-4 (0-1f, 0-1m), Ben Galvin 0-3, Ciaran Kilkenny, Rob Shaw, Darragh Warnock, Seamus O'Carroll 0-1 each	Report	Bernard Brogan 1-1, Sean Bugler 0-2, Niall Walsh 0-1	Somerton Park

25 July 2020; 18:30	Kilmacud Crokes	6-13 - 0-10	Raheny	Silverpark
25 July 2020; 18:30	Paul Mannion 2-6, Mark O'Leary, Conor Kinsella, Dara Jones, Niall O'Leary 1-0 each			Silverpark

Round 2

5 August 2020; 19:30	Raheny	0-16 - 1-10	Castleknock	St Anne's Park

5 August 2020; 19:30	Kilmacud Crokes	3-20 - 3-8	St Oliver Plunketts/ER	Martin Savage Park; Referee: Darren Delaney
5 August 2020; 19:30	Dara Mullin 2-3 (0-2f), Shane Cunningham 0-6, Hugh Kenny 1-1, Cian O'Connor 0-3 (1 '45), Andrew McGowan and Paul Mannion 0-2 each, Ross McGowan, Conor Kinsella, Aidan Jones 0-1 each		Sean Bugler 1-3, Gareth Smith 0-3f, Sean O'Connor and Cillian Hayes 1-0 each, Niall Walsh and Bernard Brogan 0-1 each	Martin Savage Park; Referee: Darren Delaney

Round 3

16 August 2020; 14:30	Kilmacud Crokes	1-11 - 0-12	Castleknock	Parnell Park

26 August 2020; 19:30	Raheny	2-13 - 2-10	St Oliver Plunketts/ER	Parnell Park

=== Quarter-finals ===
- Kilmacud Crokes 4-15, 1-12 St. Vincent's, Parnell Park, 29/8/2020,
- St. Jude's 1-17, 1-10 Skerries Harps, Parnell Park, 29/8/2020,
- Ballyboden St. Enda's 2-16, 0-16 Raheny, Parnell Park, 30/8/2020,
- Ballymun Kickhams 1-18, 2-13 Na Fianna, Parnell Park, 30/8/2020,

=== Semi-finals ===
- Ballyboden St. Enda's 2-11, 1-11 St. Judes, Parnell Park, 12/9/2020,
- Ballymun Kickhams 1-18, 2-12 Kilmacud Crokes, Parnell Park, 13/9/2020,

=== Final ===
- Ballymun Kickhams 1-19- 0-08 Ballyboden St. Enda's 0-08, Parnell Park, 27/9/2020

=== Relegation play-offs ===
- Games not played due to COVID-19 pandemic

== Senior 2 ==
The team named first in Rounds 1 and 2 in each group will have home advantage. Round 3 will see teams play at neutral venues.

=== Group 1 ===
Team	Pld	W	L	D	PF	PA	PD	Pts
Templeogue Synge Street	3	3	0	0	60	30	+30	6
Ballyboughal	3	2	0	0	45	35	+10	4
Fingallians	3	1	0	0	51	34	+17	2
St. Peregrines	3	0	0	0	24	81	-57	0

Round 1

25 July 2020; 18:30	Fingallians	1-23 - 0-7	St. Peregrines	Blakestown

25 July 2020; 18:30	Templeogue Synge Street	1-11 - 0-9	Ballyboughal	Ballyboughal
25 July 2020; 18:30	Luke O'Brien 1-2, Niall Scully 0-3, Alex O'Toole and Tom Muldoon 0-2 each, Barra Dignam 0-1		Gerry Seaver 0-5 and John Rodgers 0-3	Ballyboughal

Round 2

5 August 2020; 19:30	Templeogue Synge Street	4-18 - 0-6	St. Peregrines	Dolphin Park

5 August 2020; 19:30	Ballyboughal	0-11 - 0-10	Fingallians	Lawless Park

Round 3

15 August 2020; 18:30	Templeogue Synge Street	1-13 - 1-12	Fingallians	Dolphin Park

15 August 2020; 18:30	Ballyboughal	1-22 - 1-8	St. Peregrines	Blakestown

=== Group 2 ===
Team	Pld	W	L	D	PF	PA	PD	Pts
Cuala	3	3	0	0	57	28	+29	6
Naomh Ólaf	3	2	1	0	44	55	-11	4
Parnells	3	1	2	0	36	40	-4	2
St Mary's Saggart	3	0	3	0	31	45	-14	0

Round 1

25 July 2020; 18:30	Cuala	1-7 - 0-7	St Mary's Saggart	Saggart

25 July 2020; 18:30	Naomh Ólaf	0-13 - 1-8	Parnells	Páirc Uí Bhriain
25 July 2020; 18:30	Tom Keane 0-4 (0-3f), Glenn Sorahan 0-3 (0-1f, 0-1m), Eoin Foley, Luke Murphy-Guinane, Niall Manning 0-1 each	Report		Páirc Uí Bhriain

Round 2

5 August 2020; 19:30	Cuala	2-24 - 1-6	Naomh Ólaf	Hyde Park

5 August 2020; 19:30	Parnells	1-10 - 1-7	St Mary's Saggart	Chanel

Round 3

15 August 2020; 18:30	Naomh Ólaf	2-16 - 1-11	St Mary's Saggart	Saggart

15 August 2020; 18:30	Cuala	0-17 - 1-9	Parnells	Hyde Park

=== Group 3 ===
Team	Pld	W	L	D	PF	PA	PD	Pts
Naomh Mearnóg	3	2	1	0	47	34	+13	4
St Brigid's	3	2	1	0	46	32	+14	4
Fingal Ravens	3	2	1	0	35	44	-9	4
St. Maur's	3	0	3	0	34	52	-18	0

Round 1

25 July 2020; 18:30	Naomh Mearnóg	1-12 - 1-10	St Maur's	Portmarnock

25 July 2020; 18:30	Fingal Ravens	1-9 - 0-8	St Brigid's	Rolestown

Round 2

5 August 2020; 19:30	Fingal Ravens	2-9 - 1-11	St Maur's	Rush

5 August 2020; 19:30	St Brigid's	1-13 - 0-10	Naomh Mearnóg	Russell Park

Round 3

15 August 2020; 18:30	Naomh Mearnóg	3-13 - 0-8	Fingal Ravens	Portmarnock

15 August 2020; 18:30	St Brigid's	2-16 - 0-10	St Maur's	Rush

=== Group 4 ===
Team	Pld	W	L	D	PF	PA	PD	Pts
St. Sylvester's	3	3	0	0	71	31	+40	6
Trinity Gaels	3	1	1	1	48	54	-6	3
St Annes	3	1	2	0	41	62	-21	2
Erins Isle	3	0	2	1	47	60	-13	1

Round 1

25 July 2020; 18:30	St Anne's	0-16 - 1-9	Erin's Isle	Bohernabreena

25 July 2020; 18:30	St Sylvester's	1-14 - 1-5	Trinity Gaels	Broomfield
25 July 2020; 18:30	Dan Brennan 1-3, Ross Hazley and Alex Wright 0-3 each, Luke Troy, Mark Hazley, Jamie Kennedy, Stephen Cunningham, Jack Hazley 0-1 each			Broomfield

Round 2

5 August 2020; 19:30	St Sylvester's	0-24 - 2-9	Erin's Isle	Finglas

5 August 2020; 19:30	Trinity Gaels	2-14 - 1-14	St Anne's	Drumnigh

Round 3

15 August 2020; 18:30	St Sylvester's	5-15 - 1-5	St Anne's	Bohernabreena

15 August 2020; 18:30	Erin's Isle	2-14 - 1-17	Trinity Gaels	Finglas

=== Quarter-finals ===
8/29/20; 18:00	Templeogue Synge Street	2-16 - 2-6	Naomh Ólaf	Dolphin Park

8/29/20; 18:00	Cuala	3-12 - 0-15	Balyboughal	Bray Emmets

8/29/20; 18:00	Naomh Mearnóg	0-20 - 1-5	Trinity Gaels	Portmarnock

8/29/20; 18:00	St. Brigid's	1-13 - 1-9	St Sylvester's	Broomfield

=== Semi-finals ===
9/12/20; 15:00	St. Brigid's	0-15 - 0-13	Naomh Mearnóg	Parnell Park

9/13/20; 14:00	Cuala	1-17 - 3-9	Templeogue Synge Street	Parnell Park

=== Final ===
9/27/20; 14:00	Cuala	0-14 - 0-10	St. Brigid's	Parnell Park

=== Relegation play-offs ===
- Games not played due to COVID-19 pandemic
