= James McCarthy (Gaelic footballer) =

Irish Gaelic footballer (born 1990)

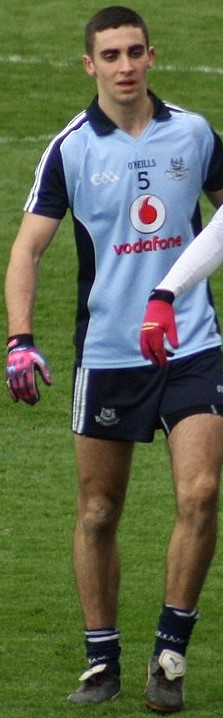
- McCarthy during the 2013 National Football League final against Tyrone at Croke Park

Personal information
- Born: 1 March 1990 (age 36) Dublin, Ireland
- Occupation: EBS

Sport
- Sport: Gaelic football
- Position: Midfield
Club
- Years: Club
- Ballymun Kickhams
Club titles
- Dublin titles: 2
- Leinster titles: 1
College
- Years: College
- DCU
College titles
- Sigerson titles: 1
Inter-county
Years	County	Apps (scores)
2010–2024	Dublin	22 (1–2)
Inter-county titles
- Leinster titles: 14
- All-Irelands: 9
- NFL: 5
- All Stars: 5

James McCarthy (born 1 March 1990) is a Gaelic footballer who plays for the Ballymun Kickhams club and, formerly, for the Dublin county team. He is widely regarded as one of Dublin's greatest ever players.

== Early life ==
He was a student at Sacred Heart BNS Ballygall and St Kevin's College in Ballygall.

His father John was also a Dublin senior inter-county player, who won the All-Ireland Senior Football Championship (SFC) on three occasions.

== Playing career ==
=== College ===
McCarthy attended DCU where he was a defender for the Gaelic football team. In 2012, he won the Sigerson Cup and the O'Byrne Cup with the college.

=== Club ===
McCarthy won two Dublin SFC titles with Ballymun, in 2012 and 2020. He added a Leinster Club SFC title in 2012. Ballymun then defeated Dr Crokes in the All-Ireland Club SFC semi-final before losing the 2013 All-Ireland Club SFC final to St Brigid's GAA (Roscommon).

=== Inter-county ===
==== Under-21 ====
McCarthy won the 2010 Leinster Under-21 Football Championship and All-Ireland Under-21 Football Championship with Dublin.

==== Senior ====
He made his championship debut for Dublin against Laois in the 2011 Leinster SFC quarter-final, winning his first Leinster SFC title against Wexford at Croke Park in July that year. Dublin progressed to the 2011 All-Ireland SFC final against Kerry, and McCarthy won his first All-Ireland Senior Football Championship. The game finished on a scoreline of 1–12 to 1–11, in Dublin's favour. McCarthy was nominated for GAA GPA Young Player of the Year for his performances.

On 4 November 2024, McCarthy announced his retirement from inter-county football, ending his 14-year senior career. In a released statement he said: "I have decided to retire from representing Dublin GAA at inter-county level, this decision hasn't been an easy one to make but I feel it's the right time."

== Personal life ==
As of 2020, McCarthy was employed by AIB and lived within two kilometres of Poppintree Park, Albert College Park and Johnstown Park.

== Honours ==
Dublin

- All-Ireland Senior Football Championship (9): 2011, 2013, 2015, 2016, 2017, 2018, 2019, 2020, 2023 (c)
- Leinster Senior Football Championship (14): 2011, 2012, 2013, 2014, 2015, 2016, 2017, 2018, 2019, 2020, 2021, 2022 (c), 2023 (c), 2024 (c)
- National Football League (5): 2013, 2014, 2015, 2016, 2018
- All-Ireland Under 21 Football Championship (1): 2010
- Leinster Under-21 Football Championship (1): 2010

Ballymun Kickhams

- Leinster Senior Club Football Championship (1): 2012
- Dublin Senior Football Championship (2): 2012, 2020

DCU

- Sigerson Cup (1): 2012
- O'Byrne Cup (1): 2012

Individual

- All Star (5): 2014, 2017, 2018, 2020, 2023
- All-Ireland Senior Football Championship Final Man of the Match (1): 2017
- The Sunday Game Team of the Year (1): 2023
- The Sunday Game Footballer of the Year (1): 2023
- In May 2020, the Irish Independent named McCarthy at number eighteen in its "Top 20 footballers in Ireland over the past 50 years".

Sporting positions
Preceded by Jonny Cooper	Dublin senior football team captain 2022–2024	Succeeded by Con O'Callaghan
Awards and achievements
Preceded by Seán O'Shea	All-Ireland SFC winning captain 2023	Succeeded by Aidan Forker
Awards
Preceded by Michael Fitzsimons	All-Ireland SFC Final; Man of the Match; 2017	Succeeded by Jack McCaffrey
