= Turlough O'Brien =

Gaelic football manager

Sport
Inter-county management
- Years: Team
- 2014–2020: Carlow

Turlough O'Brien is a Gaelic football manager. He managed Carlow between 2014 and 2020.

In the 2018 National Football League, O'Brien led the team out of Division 4. This was their first promotion in more than three decades.

In the 2018 Leinster Senior Football Championship, he led Carlow to a quarter-final victory against Kildare at O'Connor Park.

He resigned in June 2020.

He has since worked as a match analyst with RTÉ.

At the beginning of 2025, O’Brien took over the role of Portlaoise GAA Senior Football Manager and has remained in the role ever since.

Sporting positions
| Preceded by | Carlow Senior Football Manager; 2014–2020 | Succeeded by Niall Carew |
