= Pat Flanagan (Gaelic footballer) =

Irish Gaelic footballer and manager

Personal information
- Native name: Pádraig Ó Flanagáin (Irish)

Sport
- Sport: Gaelic football
- 1
Inter-county management
- Years: Team
- 2010–2013 2013–2014 2014–2017: Westmeath; Sligo; Offaly

Pat Flanagan is a Gaelic football manager and former player. Since 2018 he has managed Roscommon GAA club Padraig Pearses.

Flanagan played for the Offaly football team. He previously managed Westmeath, Sligo and Offaly.

== Early life ==
Born in Clara, County Offaly.

== Management career ==
Flanagan managed Kilbeggan Shamrocks to the 2000 Westmeath Intermediate Football Championship title.

=== Westmeath ===
Flanagan served as a selector under Westmeath senior football team manager Tomás Ó Flatharta. In April 2010, Flanagan was appointed after Brendan Hackett resigned due to a disastrous league campaign with the team being relegated to Division 3. Flanagan was initially appointed as interim manager in April 2010.

He was then given unanimous support to continue; though Flanagan asked for a two-year term, this was not granted as county bye-laws had it that the manager must be ratified every year.

The year 2011 proved to be a great improvement as Weatmeath qualified all the way to promotion to Division 3 where the faced Leinster finalists Louth. The game turned out to be very tense as both teams performed well; however, Louth ran out winners by a scoreline Louth 1-15 Westmeath 0-13. 2013 proved to be the best success as The Lake County gained promotion to Division 1 for the first time since 2008 despite narrowly losing to opponents Derry. Flanagan's team were then throttled by Dublin in the Championship, prompting the manager to express concern about the ever increasing gulf opening up between counties.

In September 2013, the Westmeath County Board informed Flanagan that he would be let go from his post due lack of achievements. Flanagan said he was confused by the actions of the Westmeath County Board as he had achieved promotion to Division 1 and been told that he had been given a two-year extension as manager the previous year, only to then be told while on holiday that he would have to interview to continue in the role.

=== Sligo ===
On 25 November 2013, Flanagan was ratified for one term as manager of the Sligo senior team, succeeding Kevin Walsh.

=== Offaly ===
On 30 October 2014, Flanagan was ratified as manager of both the Offaly senior and under-21 teams.

Flanagan's wife informed him that he had been sacked as Offaly manager in 2017 after she saw it posted on Twitter.

=== Padraig Pearses ===
Flanagan took control of Roscommon GAA club Padraig Pearses in 2018.

He expressed interest in the Roscommon senior football team managerial vacancy in August 2022, following Anthony Cunningham's departure, and was nominated by Padraig Pearses having led them to the Connacht Senior Club Football Championship the previous year, while also denying interest in the Longford senior football team managerial vacancy following Billy O'Loughlin's departure.

After Davy Burke was appointed to the Roscommon managerial vacancy, Flanagan quit as Pearses manager in November 2022, after five seasons.

Sporting positions
Preceded by Brendan Hackett	Westmeath Senior Football Manager; 2010–2013	Succeeded by Paul Bealin
Preceded by Kevin Walsh	Sligo Senior Football Manager; 2013–2014	Succeeded by Niall Carew
Preceded by Emmet McDonnell	Offaly Senior Football Manager; 2014–2017	Succeeded by John Maughan
