= Dublin GAA honours =

This is a list of athletes and teams who have won honours while representing Dublin GAA in Gaelic games (i.e. football, hurling, etc.).

== Football ==
=== All Stars Awards winners (football) ===
1963: Paddy Holden*, Des Foley*, Mickey Whelan*
1964: Paddy Holden*^{2nd}
1965: Paddy Holden*^{3rd}, Des Foley*^{2nd}

* Cú Chulainn Awards

Records

- 7 All Stars: Cluxton
- 6 All Stars: Fenton, Kilkenny
- 5 All Stars: McCarthy, O'Leary
- 4 All Stars: B. Brogan Jnr, J. McCaffrey, Fitzsimons, Cullen, Flynn, Kelleher, Drumm
- 3 All Stars: A. Brogan, O'Toole, B. Rock, Redmond, O'Sullivan, O'Callaghan, D. Rock, Keaveney, Curran, Mannion
- 2 All Stars: Doyle, Howard, Mullins, Whelan, Hickey, Connolly, O'Driscoll, Hargan, Cooper, Barr, Duff, MacAuley, McMahon, O'Carroll

Note: Paddy Holden received 3 Cú Chulainn Awards, while Des Foley received 2 Cú Chulainn Awards.

=== All Stars Young Footballer of the Year ===
2017: Con O'Callaghan

=== All Stars Footballer of the Year ===
2010: Bernard Brogan Jnr
2011: Alan Brogan
2013: Michael Darragh Macauley
2015: Jack McCaffrey
2018: Brian Fenton
2019: Stephen Cluxton
2020: Brian Fenton^{2nd}

=== Texaco Footballer of the Year ===
1963: Lar Foley
1974: Kevin Heffernan
1976: Jimmy Keaveney
1977: Jimmy Keaveney^{2nd}
1983: Tommy Drumm
1995: Paul Curran
2010: Bernard Brogan Jnr
2011: Alan Brogan

=== GPA Gaelic Football Team of the Year ===
2006: Stephen Cluxton, Bryan Cullen, Alan Brogan
2007: Stephen Cluxton^{2nd}, Barry Cahill, Alan Brogan^{2nd}
2010: Philly McMahon, Bernard Brogan Jnr

2010 was the final year of the GPA Gaelic Football Team of the Year and the GPA Footballer of the Year as it was amalgamated with the All Star Awards.

=== GPA Footballer of the Year ===
2010: Bernard Brogan Jnr

=== Under 21 Footballer of the Year ===
2010: Rory O'Carroll
2012: Ciarán Kilkenny
2014: Conor McHugh
2017: Aaron Byrne

=== Dublin Footballer of the Year ===
This award is presented to the Dublin Gaelic footballer judged to have been the greatest of that year.

- 1978 – Tony Hanahoe (St Vincent's)
- 1992 – Vinny Murphy (Trinity Gaels)
- 1994 – Charlie Redmond (Naomh Barróg)
- 1995 – Dessie Farrell (Na Fianna)
- 1996 – Brian Stynes (Ballyboden St Enda's)
- 1997 – John O'Leary (O'Dwyers)
- 1998 – Brian Stynes (Ballyboden St Enda's)
- 1999 – Ciarán Whelan (Raheny)
- 2000 – Paddy Christie (Ballymun Kickhams)
- 2001 – Darren Homan (Round Towers, Clondalkin)
- 2002 – Ray Cosgrove (Kilmacud Crokes)
- 2003 – Paddy Christie (Ballymun Kickhams)
- 2004 – Jason Sherlock (Na Fianna)
- 2005 – Tomás Quinn (St Vincent's)
- 2006 – Alan Brogan (St Oliver Plunketts Eoghan Ruadh)

=== All-Ireland Senior Football Championship ===
30

Year	Panel	Opponent	Final score
1891	(21-a-side)Young Irelands: G. Charlemont, G. Roche, J. Scully, T. Lyons, J. Roche, J. Silke, J. Kennedy, P. Heslin, J. Mahony, A. O’Hagan, P. O’Hagan, D. Curtis, S. Hughes, S. Flood, T. Murphy, J. Geraghty, T. Halpin, M. Cooney, P. Kelly, R. Flood, M. Condon.	Cork (Clondrohid)	2-1 - 1-1
1892	(17-a-side): G. Charlemont, G. Roche, J. Roche, J. Geraghty, R. Flood, J. Kennedy, S. Flood, S. Hughes, F. O’Malley, T. Doran. L. Kelly, P. Kelly, P. Heslin, M. Byrne, J. Silke, T. Errity, R. Curtis.	Roscommon	1-4 - 0–3
1894	(17-a-side) G. Charlemont, D. Curtis, G. Roche, P. Heslin, T. Lyons, J. Geraghty, L. Kelly, P. Kelly, T. Hughes, J. Kennedy, T. O’Mahony, M. Condon, M. Byrne, T. Errity, P. O’Toole, J. Kirwan, F. O’Malley.	Cork	Draw: 0-6 - 1-1; Replay: 0-5 - 1–2
1897	(17-a-side) W. Guiry, R. Scanlon, L. Kelly, W. Callaghan, E. Downey, D. Curtis, D. O’Donnell, M. Chambers, V. Kelly, P.J. Walsh, C. Cannon, P. O’Donaghue, R. O’Brien, P. Redmond, J. Matthews, W. Flynn, J. O’Brien.	Cork	2-6 - 0–2
1898	(17-a-side) J.J. Keane, T. Redmond, W. Sherry, J. Heslin, D. O’Callaghan, P. Levey, M. Rea, C. Sargent, P. Redmond, P. McCann, T. Norton, T. Errity, P. Fitzsimmons, P. Smith, J. Ryan, J. Ledwidge.	Waterford	2-8 - 0–4
1899	(17-a-side) J.J. Keane, J. Lane, P. McCann, D. Smith, W. Sherry, T. Errity, G. Brady, J. Ryan, M. Rea, J. Norton, J. Farrelly, P. Leary, P. Fitzsimmons, D. O’Callaghan, J. Heslin, J. Ledwidge, T. Redmond.	Cork	1-10 - 0–6
1901	(17-a-side) M. McCullagh, B. Connor, P. McCann, J. Fahy, J. O’Brien, M. Madigan, J. Grace, J. Darcy, T. Doyle, J. Whelan, T. Lawless, M. O’Brien, L. Kelly, V. Harris, P. Redmond, D. Holland, P. Daly.	London	0-14 - 0–2
1902	(17-a-side) S. Mulvey, D. Brady, M. Casey, W. Sherry, J. McCann, T. Errity, J. Keane, J. Grace, J. Dempsey, C. Brady, P. Daly, J. Brennan, P. Weymess, A. Wall, J. Fahy, P. Breen, P. Brady.	London	2-8 - 0–4
1906	(17-a-side) M. Curry, D. Brady, J. Grace, J. Dempsey, D. Kelleher, J. Brennan, M. Kelly, M. Keane, M. Barry, P. O’Callaghan, P. Casey, H. Hilliard, M. Madigan, T. Quane, T. Walsh, P. Grace, L. Sheehan.	Cork	0-5 - 0–4
1907	(17-a-side) D. Kelleher, D. Brady, J. Brennan, J. Grace, J. Lynch. H. Hilliard, T. Quane, J. Dempsey, P. Casey, M. Curry, M. Barry, M. Madigan, P. O’Callaghan, T. Walsh, M. Kelly, D. Kavanagh, P. Grace.	Cork	0-6 - 0–2
1908	(17-a-side) D. Kelleher, J. Grace, H. Hilliard, T. Walsh, J. Lynch, D. Kavanagh, J.S. Brennan, T. Healy, F. Cooney, J. Brennan, P. Daly, T. McCauley, P. Whelan, P. Fallon, M. Collins, M. Power, J. Shouldice. Subs - R. Flood, M. Griffin, B. Halliden, P. Sheehan.	London	1-10 - 0–4
1921	P. Fallon, J. Reilly, J. Norris, P. Carey, J. Synnott, P. Kirwan, W. Donavon, E. Carroll, J. Murphy, T. Pierce, F. Burke, C. McDonald, A. Balmain, J. O’Grady, W. Fitzsimons.	Mayo	1-9 - 0–2
1922	J. McDonnell, P. McDonnell, W. Robbins, A. Gibbons, J. Synnott, John Synnott, P. Carey, J. Norris, J. Reilly, W. Rooney, C. McDonald, W. Donavon, P. Kirwan, F. Burke, T. Pierce.	Galway	0-6 - 0–4
1923	J. McDonnell, J. Reilly, P. McDonnell, J. Murphy, J. Norris, J. Synnott, P. Carey, P. Kirwan, J. Stynes, F. Burke, J. Synnott, M. Shanahan, J. Sherlock, P. O’Beirne, L. Stanley.	Kerry	1-5 - 1–3
1942	C. Kelly, R. Beggs, P. Kennedy, C. Crone, P. Henry, P. O’Reilly, B. Quinn, M. Falvey, J. Fitzgerald, J. Joy, P. Bermingham, G. Fitzgerald, M. Fletcher, P. O’Connor, T. Banks. Subs - F. Ryan, S. Healy, J. Murphy, S. Moriarty, C. Boland, J. Delaney, M. Richardson.	Galway	1-10 - 1–8
1958	P. O’Flaherty, L. Foley, M. Wilson, Joe Timmons, C. O’Leary, J. Crowley, J. Boyle, John Timmons, S. Murray, P. Haughey, O. Freaney, D. Ferguson, P. Farnan, J. Joyce, K. Heffernan. Subs: M. Whelan for S. Murray, P. Downey for John Timmons, J.Brennan, B. Morris, C. Leaney, T. Gillen, D. McCann.	Derry	2-12 - 1–9
1963	P. Flynn, L. Hickey, L. Foley, W. Casey, D. McKane, P. Holden, M. Kissane, D. Foley, John Timmons, B. McDonald, M. Whelan, G. Davey, S. Behan, D. Ferguson, N. Fox. Subs - P. Downey for P. Holden, F. McPhillips, Christopher J. Kane, A. Donnelly, E. Breslin, P. Synnott, S. Lee, S. Coen, K. Heffernan.	Galway	1-9 - 0–10
1974	P. Cullen, G. O’Driscoll, S. Doherty, R. Kelleher, P. Reilly, A. Larkin, G. Wilson, S. Rooney, B. Mullins, B. Doyle, T. Hanahoe, D. Hickey, J. McCarthy, J. Keaveney, A. O’Toole. Subs - D. Billings, K. Synnott, B. Pocock, P. Gogarty, L. Deegan, B. Donovan, P. O’Neill, J. Brogan, F. Ryder.	Galway	0-14 - 1–6
1976	P. Cullen, G. O’Driscoll, S. Doherty, R. Kelleher, T. Drumm, K. Moran, P. O’Neill, B. Mullins, B. Brogan, A. O’Toole, T. Hanahoe, D. Hickey, B. Doyle, J. Keaveney, J. McCarthy. Subs: F. Ryder for T. Hanahoe, P. Gogarty for B. Doyle, J. Brogan, P. Reilly, B. Pocock, L. Deegan.	Kerry	3-8 - 0–10
1977	P. Cullen, G. O’Driscoll, S. Doherty, R. Kelleher, T. Drumm, K. Moran, P. O’Neill, B. Mullins, B. Brogan, A. O’Toole, T. Hanahoe, D. Hickey, B. Doyle, J. Keaveney, J. McCarthy. Subs: A. Larkin for B. Brogan, P. Reilly for P O’Neill, J. Brogan for R. Kelleher, P. Gogarty, B. Pocock, F. Ryder, N. Bernard, M. Hickey, L. Egan, D. Maher.	Armagh	5-12 - 3–6
1983	J. O’Leary, M. Holden, G. Hargan, R. Hazley, P. Canavan, T. Drumm, P. J. Buckley, J. Ronayne, B. Mullins, B. Rock, T. Conroy, K. Duff, J. Caffrey, A. O’Toole, J. McNally. Subs: J. Kearns for T. Conroy, K. Maher for J. Caffrey. M. Kennedy, A. McCaul, B. Jordan, C. Redmond, F. McGrath, V. Conroy, W. Hughes, P. Ryan, R. Crean, D. McGrath.	Galway	1-10 - 1–8
1995	J. O’Leary, P. Moran, C. Walsh, K. Galvin, P. Curran, K. Barr, M. Deegan, P. Bealin, B. Stynes, J. Gavin, D. Farrell, P. Clarke, M. Galvin, J. Sherlock, C. Redmond. Subs: P. Gilroy for K. Galvin, R. Boyle for M. Galvin, V. Murphy for D. Farrell, D. Byrne, B. Barnes, J. O’Callaghan, E. Sheehy, S. Cahill, S. Keogh.	Tyrone	1-10 - 0–12
2011	S. Cluxton, C. O'Sullivan, R. O’Carroll, M. Fitzsimons, J. McCarthy, G. Brennan, K. Nolan, D. Bastick, M. D. MacAuley, P. Flynn, B. Cahill, B. Cullen, A. Brogan, D. Connolly, B. Brogan. Subs: P. McMahon for McCarthy, K. McManamon for Flynn, E. O’Gara for Cahill, E. Fennell for Bastick.	Kerry	1-12 - 1–11
2013	S Cluxton, P. McMahon, R. O’Carroll, J Cooper, J McCarthy, G Brennan, J McCaffrey, M. D. MacAuley, C O'Sullivan, P. Flynn, C Kilkenny, D Connolly, P Mannion, P Andrews, B. Brogan. Subs: E. O’Gara for Mannion, Darren Daly for McCaffrey, Dean Rock for Kilkenny, K. McManamon for Andrews, D. Bastick for Cooper	Mayo	2-12 - 1–14
2015	S Cluxton; J Cooper, R. O’Carroll, P. McMahon; J McCarthy, C O’Sullivan, J McCaffrey; B. Fenton, D. Bastick; P. Flynn, D Connolly, C Kilkenny; P Andrews, D Rock, B. Brogan. Subs: K. McManamon for Rock, M. D. MacAuley for Bastick, M. Fitzsimons for Cooper, J Small for McCaffrey, D Daly for O'Sullivan, A. Brogan for Fenton.	Kerry	0-12 - 0–9
2016	S Cluxton, P McMahon, J Copper, M Fitzsimons, J McCarthy, C O'Sullivan, J Small, B. Fenton, P. Flynn, P Andrews, K. McManamon, C Kilkenny, D Rock, D Connolly, P Mannion. Subs: D Byrne for Cooper, B. Brogan for Andrews, MD. MacAuley for Mannion, C Costello for McManamon, E Lowndes for Small, D Daly for O’Sullivan.	Mayo	1-15 - 1–14
2017	S Cluxton, J Copper, P McMahon, M Fitzsimons, J Small, C O’Sullivan, J McCaffrey, B. Fenton, J McCarthy, C Kilkenny, D Rock, C O'Callaghan, P Andrews, E. O’Gara, P Mannion Subs: P. Flynn for McCaffrey, D Connolly for Andrews, K. McManamon for O'Gara, B. Brogan for Paul Flynn, N Scully for O'Callaghan, C Costello for Mannion.	Mayo	1-17 - 1–16
2018	S Cluxton, P McMahon, J Copper, Eoin Murchan; J Small, C O'Sullivan, J McCaffrey, B. Fenton, J McCarthy, N Scully, C O'Callaghan, Brian Howard; P Mannion, C Kilkenny, D Rock. Subs: M Fitzsimons, for Cian O'Sullivan), C Costello for Niall Scully, K. McManamon for Paul Mannion, D Daly for Eoin Murchan, E Lowndes for Jonny Cooper, M. D. MacAuley for Dean Rock.	Tyrone	2-17 - 1–14
2019	S Cluxton, D Byrne, M Fitzsimons, J Copper, J McCaffrey, Eoin Murchan, J Small; B. Fenton, J McCarthy, N Scully, C Kilkenny, Brian Howard; P Mannion, C O'Callaghan, D Rock. Subs: D Connolly for McCaffrey; P McMahon for Murchan; C Costello for Scully; C O’Sullivan for Byrne; K. McManamon for Mannion; MD. MacAuley for Howard.	Kerry	1-18 - 0–15
2020	S Cluxton, J Copper, D Byrne, M Fitzsimons, E Murchan, J Small, R McDaid, B. Fenton, J McCarthy, S Bugler, C Kilkenny, N Scully, D Rock, C O'Callaghan, P Small Subs: B Howard for Bugler, P Mannion for P. Small, C Basquel for Cooper, C Costello for Paul Flynn, P McMahon for Murchan, C Costello for Scully,	Mayo	2-14 - 0–15

=== National Football League ===
13

Year	Panel	Opponent
1953	A. O’Grady, D. Mahony, M. Moylan, M. Wilson, J. Lavin, N. Allen, N. Maher, J. Crowley, M. Whelan, D. Ferguson, O. Freaney, C. Freaney, B. Atkins, A. Young, K. Heffernan.	Cavan
1955	P. O’Flaherty, D. Mahony, J. Lavin, M. Moylan, W. Monks, N. Allen, N. Maher, J. Crowley, S. McGuinness, D. Ferguson, O. Freaney, C. O’Leary, P. Haughey, K. Heffernan, S. O’Boyle. Sub: Mossy Whelan	Meath
1958	P. O’Flaherty, M. Wilson, Joe Timmons, J. Brennan, C. O’Leary, J. Crowley, S. O’Boyle, S. Murray, P. Downey, P. Haughey, O. Freaney, D. Ferguson, P. Farnan, J. Joyce, K. Heffernan. Subs: L. Foley, C. Leaney	Kildare
1976	P. Cullen, G. O’Driscoll, S. Doherty, R. Kelleher, B. Pocock, P. O’Neill, K. Synnott, B. Mullins, K. Moran, A. O’Toole, T. Hanahoe, D. Hickey, R. Doyle, J. Keaveney, P. Gogarty. Sub: B. Brogan	Derry
1978	P. Cullen, G. O’Driscoll, S. Doherty, R. Kelleher, F. Ryder, J. Brogan, P. O’Neill, B. Mullins, B. Brogan, A. O’Toole, T. Hanahoe, D. Hickey, R. Doyle, J. Keaveney, J. McCarthy.	Mayo
1987	J. O’Leary, D. Carroll, G. Hargan, M. Kennedy, D. Synnott, G. O’Neill, N. McCaffrey, J. Ronayne, D. Bolger, B. Rock, J. McNally, K. Duff, D. De Lappe, M. Galvin, A. McCaul. Sub: D. Sheehan	Kerry
1991	J. O’Leary, M. Deegan, C. Walsh, M. Kennedy, T. Carr, K. Barr, E. Heery, D. Foran, P. Clarke, C. Redmond, P. Curran, N. Guiden, J. Sheedy, V. Murphy, D. McCarthy. Sub: M. Galvin, K. Duff	Kildare
1993	J. O’Leary, C. Walsh, D. Deasy, P. Moran, E. Heery, P. Curran, M. Deegan, J. Sheedy, P. Bealin, J. Calvert, T. Carr, N. Guiden, C. Redmond, V. Murphy, M. Doran. Subs: K. Barr, M. Galvin. The Game finished as a draw.	Donegal
1993 Replay	J. O’Leary, C. Walsh, D. Deasy, P. Moran, E. Heery, P. Curran, M. Deegan, J. Sheedy, P. Bealin, J. Gavin, T. Carr, N. Guiden, P. Clarke, V. Murphy, M. Doran.	Donegal
2013	S Cluxton; K O’Brien, J Cooper, D Daly; J McCarthy, G. Brennan, J McCaffrey, MD. MacAuley, C O'Sullivan, J Whelan, Diarmuid Connolly, B Cullen, P Mannion, P Andrews, B. Brogan. Subs used: S Carthy for Whelan, K. McManamon for Cullen, D Bastick for O’Sullivan, P. McMahon for McAuley, D Rock for Brogan	Tyrone
2014	S Cluxton, P. McMahon, R O'Carroll, J Cooper, J McCarthy, N Devereux, K. Nolan; MD. MacAuley, C O'Sullivan, P. Flynn, P Andrews, Diarmuid Connolly, A Brogan, E. O’Gara, B. Brogan Subs Used: K. McManamon for Andrews, D Byrne for Nolan, M. Fitzsimons for O’Carroll, C Reddin for O’Gara, D Nelson for O’Sullivan, T Brady for A Brogan.	Derry
2015	S Cluxton; P McMahon, R O'Carroll, J Cooper; J McCarthy, C O'Sullivan, J McCaffrey; D Bastick, B Fenton; T Brady, C Kilkenny, D Connolly; D Rock, K. McManamon, B. Brogan. Subs: M. Fitzsimons for O'Carroll, P Andrews for Brady, E O Conghaile for Bastick, C Costello for Connolly, J Small for McMahon, D Daly for Fenton.	Cork
2016	S Cluxton; David Byrne, P McMahon, J Cooper; J Small, C O'Sullivan, J McCarthy; B Fenton, D Bastick; P. Flynn, D Rock, C Kilkenny; P Mannion, D Connolly, B. Brogan. Subs: MD. MacAuley for Bastick, K. McManamon for Connolly, C Costello for Rock, M. Fitzsimons for McMahon, E Lowndes for Mannion, D Daly for Small.	Kerry
2018		Galway

=== Leinster Senior Football Championship ===
59

- 1891, 1892, 1894, 1896, 1897, 1898, 1899, 1901, 1902, 1904, 1906, 1907, 1908, 1920, 1921, 1922, 1923, 1924, 1932, 1933, 1934, 1941, 1942, 1955, 1958, 1959, 1962, 1963, 1965, 1974, 1975, 1976, 1977, 1978, 1979, 1983, 1984, 1985, 1989, 1992, 1993, 1994, 1995, 2002, 2005, 2006, 2007, 2008, 2009, 2011, 2012, 2013, 2014, 2015, 2016, 2017, 2018, 2019, 2020

Year	Panel	Opponent
1994	J. O'Leary, C. Walsh, D. Deasy, P. Moran, P. Curran, K. Barr, M. Deegan, B. Stynes, P. Bealin, P. Gilroy, J. Sheedy, N. Guiden, D. Farrell, M. Galvin, C. Redmond. Subs: P. Clarke for Bealin, V. Murphy for Gilroy, G. Reganfor Deasy.	Meath
1995	J. O’Leary, P. Moran, D. Deasy, K. Galvin, P. Curran, K. Barr, M. Deegan, P. Bealin, B. Stynes, J. Gavin, D. Farrell, P. Clarke, C. Redmond, J Sherlock, M. Galvin. Sub: V. Murphy.	Meath
2002	S. Cluxton, B. Cahill, P. Christie, C. Goggins, P. Casey, P. Andrews, P. Curran, C. Whelan, D. Homan, S. Ryan, S. Connell, A. Brogan, R. Cosgrove, J. McNally. Subs: D. Magee for Curran 41, J. Sherlock for Connell 55, D. Farrell for McNally 58, D. Henry for Homan 60.	Kildare
2005	S Cluxton, P Griffin, P Christie, S O'Shaughnessy; C Goggins, B Cahill, P Casey, C Whelan, S Ryan; C Moran, B Cullen, C Keaney; J Sherlock, A Brogan, T Quinn. Subs: S Connell for Goggins, P Andrews for Christie, D Homan for Ryan.	Laois
2006	S Cluxton, D Henry, B Cahill, P Griffin, P Casey, B Cullen, C Goggins; C Whelan, S Ryan; C Keaney (0–2), A Brogan (0–4), R Cosgrove; J Sherlock (1-1), D Lally, T Quinn (0–8). Subs: S Connell, D O’Callaghan, D Magee, C Moran, S O’Shaughnessy	Offaly
2007	S. Cluxton, D Henry, R McConnell, P Griffin, P Casey, B Cullen, B Cahill, C Whelan, S Ryan; C Moran, J Sherlock, Bernard Brogan, C Keaney, A Brogan, M Vaughan. Subs: T Quinn for Sherlock, K Bonner for Vaughan, G. Brennan for Casey, D Connolly for B Brogan, J Magee for Whelan.	Laois
2008	S Cluxton, D Henry, P Griffin, C Moran, K. Nolan, B Cullen, B Cahill, C Whelan, S Ryan, D Connolly; J Sherlock, K Bonner; A Brogan(capt), C Keaney, T Quinn; Subs: P Casey for Nolan, P. Flynn for Bonner, M Vaughan for Connolly, R McConnell for Griffin, D Murray for Sherlock.	Wexford
2009	S Cluxton, D Henry, D Bastick, P Andrews, P Griffin, G. Brennan, B Cahill; R McConnell, D Magee, P. Flynn, A Brogan, D Connolly; C Keaney, Bernard Brogan, J Sherlock; Subs: B Cullen for Connolly, C Whelan for Magee, T Quinn for Sherlock, S Ryan for McConnell, P Burke for Flynn.	Kildare
2011	S Cluxton; M. Fitzsimons, R O'Carroll, P Conlon; J McCarthy, G. Brennan, K Nolan; D Bastick, E Fennell, P. Flynn, A Brogan, B Cullen, Bernard Brogan, D Connolly, E. O’Gara; Subs: T Quinn for Connolly, K. McManamon for O'Gara, B Cahill for Fennell, D Henry, for B Brogan, R McConnell for Quinn.	Wexford
2012	S Cluxton; M. Fitzsimons, R O'Carroll, P. McMahon, J McCarthy, K. Nolan, C O'Sullivan; E Fennell, D Bastick, P. Flynn, A Brogan, B Cullen, Bernard Brogan, MD. MacAuley, K. McManamon; Subs: E. O’Gara for A Brogan, P Andrews for McManamon, B Cahill for Fennell, C Dias for Flynn, P Brogan for Cullen.	Meath
2013	S Cluxton; K O'Brien, R O'Carroll, J Cooper, J McCarthy, G. Brennan, J McCaffrey; MD. MacAuley, C O'Sullivan, P. Flynn, C Kilkenny, D Connolly; P Mannion, P Andrews, D Connolly; Subs: K. McManamon for A Brogan, D Bastick for McManamon, D Daly for Fennell, D Rock for Flynn, B Cullen, for Connolly.	Meath
2014	S Cluxton; R O'Carroll, M. Fitzsimons, P. McMahon, J McCarthy, N Devereux, J McCaffrey; M. D. MacAuley, C O'Sullivan; P. Flynn, K. McManamon D Connolly; A Brogan, P Mannion, D Connolly. Subs: C Costello for P Mannion, D Rock for D Connolly, E. O’Gara for A Brogan, D Daly for N Devereux, D Bastick for MD Macauley, T Brady for C O’Sullivan.	Meath
2015	S Cluxton; J Cooper, R O'Carroll, P. McMahon; J McCarthy, C O’Sullivan, J McCaffrey; Brian Fenton, MD. MacAuley; P. Flynn, C Kilkenny, D Connolly; D Rock, K. McManamon, Bernard Brogan. Subs: M. Fitzsimons for Cooper; P Andrews; D Bastick for Macauley; A Brogan for Rock; John Small; T Brady for Connolly.	Westmeath
2016	S Cluxton; J Cooper, P. McMahon, David Byrne; John Small, C O’Sullivan, E Lowndes; B Fenton, M. D. MacAuley; P. Flynn, C Kilkenny, D Connolly; K. McManamon, D Rock, Bernard Brogan. Subs: P Andrews for E Lowndes, C O'Callaghan for M D Macauley, D Bastick for D Connolly, D Daly for J Small, M. Fitzsimons for C O'Sullivan, P Mannion for D Rock	Westmeath
2017	S Cluxton; P. McMahon, C O’Sullivan, M. Fitzsimons; E Lowndes, John Small, J McCaffrey; J McCarthy, B Fenton; C O'Callaghan, C Kilkenny, N Scully; P Mannion, P Andrews, D Rock. Subs: Bernard Brogan for Rock, S Carthy for Scully, D Daly for McMahon, K. McManamon for Andrews, D Byrne for O'Sullivan, B Howard for Fenton.	Kildare
2018	Evan Comerford, Philly McMahon, Michael Fitzsimons, Eric Lowndes, James McCarthy, Jonny Cooper, Brian Howard, Brian Fenton, Michael Darragh Macauley, Niall Scully, Con O’Callaghan, Ciaran Kilkenny, Paul Mannion, Dean Rock, Paddy Andrews Subs: Jack McCaffrey for Lowndes, Cormac Costello for Andrews, John Small for Macauley, Paul Flynn for O'Callaghan, Darren Daly for Mannion, Conor McHugh for Rock	Laois
2019		Meath
2020		Meath
2020		Kildare

=== O'Byrne Cup ===
9

- 1956, 1958, 1960, 1966, 1999, 2007, 2008, 2015, 2017

=== All-Ireland Under-21 Football Championship ===
5

Year	Panel	Opponent
2003	Paul Copeland; N Kane, M Fitzpatrick, P Griffin; Niall Cooper, B Cullen, C Prenderville; D O'Mahony, P Brennan; C Keaney, L Óg Ó hÉineacháin, D Lally; A Brogan, Graham Cullen, J Noonan. Subs - D Murray, M Lyons, S Walsh.	Tyrone
2010	V Whelan; E Culligan, R. O'Carroll, D Nelson; J Cooper, James McCarthy, N Devereux; Eoin Murray, C Mullins; M Coughlan, T Furman, G Sweeney; R McCarthy, D Rock, C Dorney. Subs: D Quinn (Lucan Sarsfields) for R McCarthy (HT); C Reddin for J McCarthy; B O’Rorke for Furman; S McGuinness for Nelson; N Brogan for Dorney.	Donegal
2012	JB Carthy; M Concarr, K O'Brien, S George; L Fletcher, J Kelly, J McCaffrey; E O Conghaile, C Reddin; D Byrne, G Sweeney, M Schutte; C Kilkenny, P Ryan, P Hudson. Subs: P Maguire, G Seaver, H Dawson, P O'Higgins, P Mannion.	Roscommon
2014	L Molloy; R McGowan, D Byrne, R McDaid; C Mullally, J Small, J McCaffrey; P O’Higgins, B Fenton; S Boland, E Lowndes, N Scully; P Mannion, C Costello, C McHugh. Subs: E Ó’Conghaíle for Byrne, G Hanningan for Boland, G Ivory for O’Higgins, S Cunningham for Costello, N Walsh for Mannion.	Roscommon
2017	Evan Comerford; Darren Byrne, Sean MacMahon, Declan Monaghan; Cillian O’Shea, Eoin Murchan, Cian Murphy; Andrew Foley, Brian Howard; Dan O’Brien, Glenn O’Reilly, Aaron Byrne; Colm Basquel, C O'Callaghan, Tom Fox. Subs: Darren Gavin for Andrew Foley, Darragh Spillane for Tom Fox, Chris Sallier for Glenn O’Reilly, Andrew McGowan for Sean McMahon, Paddy Small for Colm Basquel	Galway

=== Leinster Under-21 Football Championship ===
14

Year	Panel	Opponent
1974		Wexford
1975		Laois
1980		Kildare
1984		Carlow
2002		Kildare
2003		Longford
2005		Kildare
2009		Laois
2010		Westmeath
2012	JB Carthy; S George, K OBrien, M Concarr; L Fletcher, J Kelly, J McCaffrey; C Reddin, E Ó Conghaile; M Schutte, G Sweeney, D Byrne; P Hudson, P Ryan, C Kilkenny. Subs: H Dawson for Ryan, G Seaver for Byrne, J Small for Concarr, P Maguire for Hudson, P Keogh for O Conghaile.	Louth
2014	L Molloy; R McGowan, D Byrne, R McDaid; E Lowndes, J Small, J McCaffrey; P O'Higgins, S Cunningham; N Scully, S Carthy, P Mannion; C McHugh, M Deegan, C Costello. Subs: S Boland for Deegan; G Burke for Stephen Cunningham; E O Conghaile for Costello; Shane Cunningham for O'Higgins.	Meath
2015	Lorcan Molloy; Emile Mullan, David Byrne, Ross McGowan; Eric Lowndes, Conor Mullally, Eoin Murchan; Stephen Cunningham, Shane Carthy; Gavin Burke, Andy Foley, Niall Scully; Cormac Costello, Conor McHugh, Colm Basquel. Subs - Eoin Fletcher for Mullan, Robert Gaughan for Burke, Aaron Byrne for Basquel	Kildare
2016	L Molloy; E Smith, S McMahon, D Monaghan; C O’Shea, B Howard, M Cahilan; A Foley, D McIlgorm; K Deeley, C Basquel, G O’Reilly; C Sallier, C O’Callaghan, D Spillane. Subs: S Clayton for O’Shea, A Elliot for McIlgorm, E Murchan for Monaghan, P Small for Spillane, M Deegan for Elliot. O’Shea for Sallier (e/t), K Doherty for O’Reilly, Spillane for Murchan, T O’Sullivan for Smith.	Kildare
2017		Offaly

=== All-Ireland Minor Football Championship ===
11

Year	Panel	Opponent
1930	B. Synott, G. McLoughlin, T. Sharkey, K. Barry, S. O’Toole, T. Markham, T. Lawless, J. Scott, P. Diffney, W. Fallon, W. Bastow, B. Murphy, M. Grimes, J. Pearse, P. Castian. Subs: F. Williams, J. Brady, P. Crummey	Mayo
1945	C. Feeney, D. O’Mahony, J. Sharry, G. Jennings, N. Maher, D. Healy, T. Nolan, S. McEntaggert, S. Guinea, L. Donnelly, O. Freaney, J. Nugent, J. Copeland, P. McCarthy, C. Digham	Leitrim
1954	R. Brady, M. Bohan, B. O’Boyle, D. Sweeney, T. Bracken, N. Boylan, M. Cronin, B. McLaughlin, P. Heron, V. Bell, P. Farnan, A. Kavanagh, G. O’Reilly, P. Feeney, D. Waters. Subs: E. Gilbert, V. Lyons	Kerry
1955	S. Denigan, V. Murphy, D. Sweeney, D. Hearns, R. Doherty, S. Graham, C. Jones, P. Heron, L. Foley, E. Burgess, S. Linehan, C. McSweeney, J. Joyce, G. Wolfe, C. Leaney. Sub: L. Boyle	Tipperary
1956	D. Creed, A. Talbot, P. Lacey, D. Hearns, R. Doherty, D. Cashel, V. Kavanagh, L. Foley, S. Lenihan, J. Brogan, D. Foley, N. Fox, R. McCrea, G. Wolfe, C. Leaney. Sub: P. Dennis	Leitrim
1958	K. Donnelly, N. Joyce, P. Holden, D. Mulligan, D. Jones, A. Whelan, M. Kissane, D. Foley, A. O’Reilly, P. Taylor, N. Fox, B. McDonald, J. Sweeney, J. Gilroy, B. Beggs. Sub: S. Behan	Mayo
1959	P. Talbot, E. Grainger, A. Doran, F. McCourt, M. Campion, M. Kissane, F. Byrne, S. Behan, J. Levins, P. Delaney, B. McDonald, J. Dowling, J. McKettrick, G. McCabe, S. Coen. Subs: B. Cooney, P. Taylor	Cavan
1979	J. O’Leary, J. Grace, V. Conroy, S. Wade, C. Eustace, C. Finnegan, Derek Murphy, B. Kavanagh, P. Boylan, B. Jordan, M. Loftus, C. Duff, Dermot Murphy, B. Rock, K. Barry. Subs: T. Kelly, P. McCabe.	Kerry
1982	J. McNally, C. Sage, F. McGrath, L. O’Rourke, E. Heery, T. Delaney, M. Deegan, D. Sheehan, B. Cooke, M. Coffey, M. Egan, S. O’Brien, P. O’Carroll, T. McCormack, B. Redmond. Sub: T. Murphy	Kerry
1984	M. Broderick, G. Walsh, J. Barry, C. Walsh, A. Martin, J. Power, B. McKeon, J. Stynes, P. Clarke, D. de Lappe, A. McClean, J. Fahy, N. Clancy, M. Crowley, C. Crowley. Subs: P. Daly, D. Whelan, P Robinson	Tipperary
2012	L Molloy; E Mullan, D Byrne, R McGowan; M Mac Donncha, C Mulally, E Lowndes; Stephen Cunningham, S Carthy; G Burke, C McHugh, N Walsh; N Scully, R Gaughan, C Costello. Subs: Shane Cunningham for Gaughan, D Gormley for Burke, D Campbell for Walsh, M Deegan for Scully.	Meath

=== Leinster Minor Football Championship ===
33

- 1930, 1933, 1934, 1945, 1946, 1948, 1949, 1954, 1955, 1956, 1958, 1959, 1961, 1968, 1970, 1971, 1976, 1978, 1979, 1981, 1982, 1984, 1986, 1988, 1994, 1999, 2001, 2003, 2009, 2011, 2012, 2014, 2017

=== Gerry Reilly Cup ===
6

- 1993, 1998, 2006, 2008 (U17 Blitz), 2012, 2013

=== All-Ireland Junior Football Championship ===
6

Year	Panel	Opponent
1914	P. Carey, S. Synott, T. Corr, M. Nolan, P. Smith, D. Kiely, D. Kelly, P. Kearns, F. Burke, F. McGann, J. Cromien, P. McDonnell, J. Coogan, J. McAdams, P. Whelan	Mayo
1916	F. McGann, J. Maguire, H. O’Neill, N. Sheridan, J. O’Reilly, P. McDonnell, J. Molloy, P. White, J. O’Donavon, P. McCarville, F. Burke, B. Joyce, J. Hayden, J. Treacy, J. Byrne	Limerick
1939	P. Dowling, B. Murphy, C. Donnellan, W. Rayburn, F. Harford, H. Donnelly, D. Smyth, R. Smyth, J. Farrell, T. Dowling, M. Richardson, M. Meehan, T. Markey, J. Sweeney, M. O’Reilly. Sub: P. Kennedy	London
1948	V. Russell, L. Ledwidge, G. Donoghue, N. Fingleton, M. Richardson, E. Lyons, M. Scanlon, S. Farrell, J. Tunney, P. Walsh, J. O’Toole, J. McDonnell, J. Copeland, E. Kenneally, K. Heffernan	London
1960	F. McPhillips, Christopher J. Kane, J. Farrell, F. McHugh, C. Carroll, D. Mulligan, O. Callaghan, S. Murray, P. Hallinan, P. Delaney, V. Murphy, S. Coen, B. McDonald, J. Kirwan, F. McCourt	London
2008	C Clarke; D Daly, M. Fitzsimons, C. Prenderville; M White, A Dennis, N Brogan; D. Bastick, C Daly; R Joyce, K Connolly, J Cooper; W Finnegan, E O'Gara, A Darcy. Subs: D. Homan for Joyce (42); C Norton for Finnegan (51); N Tormey for Connolly (61).	Roscommon

=== Leinster Junior Football Championship ===
20

- 1908, 1914, 1916, 1922, 1926, 1930, 1939, 1948, 1950, 1951, 1954, 1955, 1959, 1960, 1971, 1983, 1985, 1987, 1994, 2008

== Hurling ==
=== All Stars Awards winners (hurling) ===
9

- 1971: M. Bermingham
- 1990: B. McMahon
- 2009: Alan McCrabbe
- 2011: Liam Rushe Gary Maguire
- 2013: Peter Kelly, Liam Rushe, Danny Sutcliffe
- 2025: Cian O'Sullivan

Record

- 2 All Stars: Liam Rushe

=== All-Ireland Senior Hurling Championship ===
6

Year	Panel	Opponent	Venue	Final score	Attendance
1889	Kickhams: (21-a-side): F. Coughlan, T. Butler, J. Lambe, D. Kerwick, J.D. O’Byrne, T. McKenna, W. Spain, J. Harper, C. Hackett, T. Maher, N. O’Shea, J. Bishop, T. Belton, P. Ryan, J. Cahill, E. Gilligan, F. Palmer, S. Riordan, P. O’Shea, P. Riordan, M. Madigan.	Clare (Tulla)	Inchicore	5-1 - 1–6	Unknown
1917	Collegians: T. Daly, John Ryan (c), S. Hyde, S. O’Donavon, H. Burke, C. Stuart, J. Phelan, R. Mockler, T. Moore, J. Cleary, F. burke, M. Neville, M. Hackett, M. Hayes, P. Kenefick. Sub: B. Considine.	Tipperary (Boherlahan)	Croke Park	5-4 - 4–2	11,000
1920	Faughs: T. Daly, R. Doherty, J. Walsh, F. Burke, J.J. Callanan, J. Phelan, J. Ryan, J. Clune, R. Mockler, M. Hayes, M. Neville, T. Moore, T. Hayes, J. Cleary, E. Tobin.	Cork (Selection)	Croke Park	4-9 - 4–3	22,000
1924	T. Daly, J. Bannon, W. Small, T. Kelly, M. Gill, J. Walsh, R. Mockler, P. Aylward, R. Doherty, M. Holland, D. O’Neill, G. Howard, T. Barry, W. Banim, T. Finlay.	Galway	Croke Park	5-3 - 2–6	9,000
1927	T. Daly, M. Gill, P. McInerney, W. Phelan, E. Tobin, J. Gleeson, T. O’Rourke, G. Howard, M. Power, E. Fahy, T. Barry, J. Walsh, D. O’Neill, J. Bannon, M. Hayes.	Cork	Croke Park	4-8 - 1–3	23,824
1938	M. Daniels, C. Forde, T. Teehan, M. Butler, C. McMahon, M. Gill, P. Farrell, J. Byrne, H. Gray, R. Ryan, M. McDonnell, P. Doody, M. Brophy, M. Flynn, W. Loughnane. Sub: J. Gilmartin.	Waterford	Croke Park	2-5 - 1–6	37,129

=== National Hurling League ===
3

- 1929, 1939, 2011

=== Leinster Senior Hurling Championship ===
24

- 1889, 1892, 1894, 1896, 1902, 1906, 1908, 1917, 1919, 1920, 1921, 1924, 1927, 1928, 1930, 1934, 1938, 1941, 1942, 1944, 1948, 1952, 1961, 2013

=== Walsh Cup ===
5

- 1960, 1964, 1966, 2003, 2011

=== Walsh Shield ===
1

- 2009

=== Kehoe Cup ===
1

- 1981

=== All-Ireland Under-21 Hurling Championship ===
0

=== Leinster Under-21 Hurling Championship ===
5

Year	Panel	Opponent
1967		
1972		
2007	P Curtin; R Drumgoole, P Callaghan, D Webster; K Dunne, T Brady, M McGarry; J Boland, A McCrabbe; E Moran, D Connolly, S Lehane; P Carton, D O'Dwyer, R O'Carroll. Subs: J McCaffrey for Lehane (34 mins), S Durkin for Moran (35).	Offaly
2010		
2011		
2016	J Treacy; J Madden, E O’Donnell, C Hendricken; S Barrett, C MacGabhann, J Bellew; J Malone, M McCallion; A Jamieson Murphy, R McBride, E Conroy; S Treacy, S O’Riain, C Bennett. Subs: C Boland for M McCallion, C O’Neill for C Bennett, P O’Dea for C Hendricken, F O Riain Broin for J Malone, E McHugh for E Conroy.	Offaly

=== All-Ireland Minor Hurling Championship ===
4

- 1945, 1946, 1954, 1965

=== Leinster Minor Hurling Championships ===
15

Year	Panel	Opponent
2005	C McCormack; P Callaghan, R Drumgoole, E Walsh; K Dunne, T Brady, C Connolly; J Boland, J McCaffrey; K O'Reilly, S Casey, J Maher; R O'Carroll, D O'Dwyer, S Durkin. Subs: S O'Rorke for Durkin, C Twomey for Maher.	Wexford
2007	F McGarry; O Gough, E Walsh, P Schutte; P Buckeridge, R O'Carroll, P Kelly; D Mooney, D Whelan; J Cooper, D Treacy, B. O'Rorke; N McMurrow, P Garbutt, W Brogan. Subs: A McMullan for Mooney, K O'Loughlin for Garbutt, E McCabe for McMurrow, R O'Loughlin for Brogan, M Jordan for Schutte.	Kilkenny
2011	C Ryan; E Lowndes, C O’Callaghan, S McClelland; C Crummey, J Desmond, M McCaffrey; G Whelan, C Cronin; C McHugh, C Kilkenny, A Clabby; C Costello, E Ó Conghaile, P Winters. Subs: O O’Rorke for Winters, B McCarthy for Cronin, D Forde for Whelan and C Boland for McHugh.	Kilkenny
2012	C Mac Gabhann; E Lowndes, C O'Callaghan, S Barrett; S McClelland, R Murphy, E O'Donnell; C Costello, C Cronin; C McHugh, S Treacy, C Conway; C Boland, O O'Rorke, P Winters. Subs: D Gormley for Conway, C Bennett for Treacy, J Roche for McHugh.	Wexford
2016	D De Poire; J O’Neill, P Smyth, D Ryan; J McVeigh, C O’Sullivan, E Foley; C Ryan, D Gray; C Burke, J McGuirk, D Burke; C Currie, C Dowling, M O’Keeffe Subs: R Hayes for O’Keeffe, D Hawkshaw for McVeigh, J Walsh for Gray, D Keogh for C Ryan, P Feeney for Currie.	Wexford
2018		Kilkenny

- 1928, 1938, 1945, 1946, 1947, 1952, 1953, 1954, 1965, 1983

=== All-Ireland Junior Hurling Championship ===
3

- 1932, 1937, 1952

=== Leinster Junior Hurling Championship ===
8

- 1908, 1925, 1932, 1937, 1947, 1950, 1952, 1955

=== Leinster Intermediate Hurling Championship ===
4

- 1966, 1968, 1970, 1972

== Handball ==
=== Senior Hardball Singles ===
Year	Player	Club
1926, 1927, 1928, 1929, 1930, 1931	T. Soye	
1944	A. Clarke	
1948, 1949	A. Clarke	
1951	A. Clarke	
1954, 1955	A. Clarke	
2003, 2004, 2005	E. Kennedy	St Brigid's

=== Senior Softball Singles ===
Years	Player	Club
1925	M. Joyce	
1927	W. McGuire	
1947, 1949, 1951	L. Rowe	
1980	P. Ryan	
2004, 2005, 2006	Eoin Kennedy	St Brigid's Senior Softball SinglesYears Player Club 1925: M. Joyce 1927: W. McGuire 1947, 1949, 1951: L. Rowe 1980: P. Ryan 2004, 2005, 2006: Eoin Kennedy St Brigid's

== Ladies' football ==
=== All Stars ===
Season	
1983	Kathleen Kennedy
1984	Kathleen Kennedy
1991	Julie Kavanagh
1993	Denise Smith
2001	Louise Kelly
2002	Suzanne Hughes, Síle Nic Coitir
2003	Maria Kavanagh, Martina Farrell, Angie McNally
2004	Clíodhna O'Connor, Louise Keegan, Bernie Finlay, Mary Nevin
2005	Gemma Fay, Lyndsey Davey
2009	Clíodhna O'Connor, Siobhán McGrath, Sinéad Aherne
2010	Rachel Ruddy, Siobhán McGrath, Gemma Fay, Denise Masterson, Amy McGuinness, Sinéad Aherne
2011	Elaine Kelly, Sinéad Aherne
2012	Sinéad Goldrick
2013	Sinéad Goldrick
2014	Sinéad Goldrick, Noëlle Healy, Lyndsey Davey, Sinéad Aherne
2015	Sinead Finnegan, Sinéad Goldrick, Carla Rowe, Lyndsey Davey
2016	Leah Caffrey, Sinéad Goldrick, Noëlle Healy, Carla Rowe, Sinéad Aherne
2017	Ciara Trant, Rachel Ruddy, Leah Caffrey, Nicole Owens, Sinéad Aherne, Noëlle Healy
2018	Sinéad Aherne, Sinéad Goldrick, Ciara Trant, Siobhán McGrath, Lauren Magee, Noëlle Healy, Lyndsey Davey
2019	Niamh Collins, Sinéad Goldrick, Olwen Carey, Siobhán McGrath, Carla Rowe, Niamh McEvoy, Lyndsey Davey

=== All-Ireland Senior Ladies' Football Championship ===
- Winners: 2010, 2017, 2018, 2019, 2020: 5
- Runners up: 2003, 2004, 2009, 2014, 2015, 2016, 2021: 7

=== Ladies' National Football League ===
Division One

- Winners: 2018: 1
- Runners up: 2014 : 1

Division Two

- Winners: 2007

=== Leinster Senior Ladies' Football Championship ===
- Winners: 2003, 2004, 2005, 2008, 2009, 2010, 2012, 2013, 2014, 2015, 2016, 2017, 2018, 2019: 14 ?

=== All-Ireland Junior Ladies' Football Championship ===
- 1989

=== All-Ireland Under-18 Ladies' Football Championship ===
- Winners: 2008, 2012: 2
- Runners up: 1990, 2007, 2011, 2013, 2016 : 5

=== All-Ireland Under-16 Ladies' Football Championship: 2 ===
- Winners: 1989, 2006, 2010: 3
- Runners up: 2005, 2011, 2013, 2014, 2016 : 5

=== All-Ireland Under-14 Ladies' Football Championship ===
- Winners: 2004, 2005, 2007: 3
- Runners up: 2006, 2010, 2011, 2018 : 4

=== Leinster Minor A Football Championship ===
- 2008

== Camogie ==
=== All-Ireland Senior Camogie Championship ===
26

(click on year for team line-outs)

- 1932, 1933, 1937, 1938, 1942, 1943, 1944, 1948, 1949, 1950, 1951, 1952, 1953, 1954, 1955, 1957, 1958, 1959, 1960, 1961, 1962, 1963, 1964, 1965, 1966, 1984

=== National Camogie League ===
3

- Dublin has won the National Camogie League on three occasions (click on year for the teams): in 1979, 1981, 1983.

=== All-Ireland Intermediate Camogie Championship ===
- 1992

=== All-Ireland Junior Camogie Championship ===
5

- 1970, 1971, 1975, 2005, 2006

=== All-Ireland Under-16 Camogie Championship ===
2

- 1982
- 2012
