= 1994 All-Ireland Senior Football Championship final =

- Event: 1994 All-Ireland Senior Football Championship
Down	Dublin
1–12 (15)	0–13 (13)
- Date: 18 September 1994
- Venue: Croke Park, Dublin
- Referee: Tommy Sugrue (Kerry)
- Attendance: 58,684

The 1994 All-Ireland Senior Football Championship final was the 107th All-Ireland Final and the deciding match of the 1994 All-Ireland Senior Football Championship, an inter-county Gaelic football tournament for the top teams in Ireland.

== Match ==
This year's final was played on 18 September.

=== Summary ===
James McCartan Jnr scored the winning goal to complete an unprecedented Ulster four-in-a-row, and to extend Down's unbeaten final record to five wins out of five. Down maintained this remarkable record in All-Ireland finals until their sixth appearance in 2010, when Cork defeated them by a score of 0–16 to 0–15.

Down's second All-Ireland football title of the decade following their success in 1991, they were joint "team of the decade" for the 1990s with Meath who won two titles in 1996 and 1999.

This was the last occasion on which a team from Ulster won an All-Ireland SFC until Armagh won the 2002 All-Ireland Senior Football Championship final.

=== Details ===
18 September 1994	Down	1-12 - 0-13	Dublin	Croke Park, Dublin
	M Linden 0-4, J McCartan 1-0, R Carr 0-3, G Mason 0-3, G McCartan 0-1, A Farrell 0-1.		C Redmond 0-4, J Sheedy 0-2, P Curran 0-1, P Clarke 0-1, B Stynes 0-1, V Murphy 0-1, N Guiden 0-1, D Farrell 0-1, S Cahill 0-1.	Attendance: 58,684; Referee: T Sugrue (Kerry)

==== Down ====
- 1 N. Collins
- 2 M. Magill
- 3 B.Burns
- 4 P. Higgins
- 5 É. Burns
- 6 B. Breen
- 7 D. J. Kane (c)
- 8 G. McCartan
- 9 C. Deegan
- 10 R. Carr
- 11 G. Blaney
- 12 J. McCartan
- 13 M. Linden
- 14 A. Farrell
- 15 G. Mason

Sub used
17 G. Colgan for C. Deegan

Subs not used
16 E. Connolly
18 G. Deegan
19 P. Withnell
20 J. Kelly
21 R. Starkey
22 C. McCabe
23 B. Hynes
24 R. Sharvin

Manager
P. McGrath

==== Dublin ====
- 1 J. O'Leary
- 2 P. Moran
- 3 D. Deasy
- 4 P. Curran
- 5 P. Clarke
- 6 K. Barr
- 7 M. Deegan
- 8 B. Stynes
- 9 J. Sheedy
- 10 P. Gilroy
- 11 V. Murphy
- 12 N. Guiden
- 13 C. Redmond
- 14 M. Galvin
- 15 D. Farrell

Subs used
19 P. Bealin for P. Gilroy
20 S. Cahill for M. Galvin
21 J. Barr for N. Guiden

Subs not used
16 M. Pender
17 L. Walsh
18 G. Regan
22 T. Carr
23 J. Gavin
24 J. Calvert

Manager
P. O'Neill
