= St Declan's College =

Location
- Nephin Road; Cabra West, Dublin 7, D07NN63; Ireland

Information
- School type: Public, Secondary
- Motto: Cursum Tenere (Stay thy course)
- Established: 1960
- Principal: Eibhlín O'Reilly
- Staff: ~50
- Enrollment: ~700
- Colour: Yellow
- Website: www.stdeclanscollege.ie

St Declan's College is an all-boys, Catholic secondary school located in Cabra West, Dublin, Ireland. It was originally established by The Christian Brothers in 1960 with an initial enrollment of 75. It is now a public (state-funded) school under the management of the Edmund Rice Schools Trust.

== Notable alumni ==
=== Sportspeople (footballers) ===
- The Brogan family: Bernard Brogan Snr; Jim Brogan; Alan Brogan, born 1982; Bernard Brogan Jnr, born 1984; Paul Brogan, born 1986
- Harry Kenny, born 1962
- Owen Heary, born 1976
- Richie Partridge, born 1980
- Barry Cahill, born 1981
- Paul Keegan, born 1984
- Shane Supple, born 1987
- Kevin Bonner
- Senan Connell
- Declan Lally
- Kevin Nolan
- Seán Bugler

=== Sportspeople (other) ===
- Alan Nolan, hurler born 1985
- Peadar Carton, hurler and footballer born 1986
- Donal Burke, hurler

=== Artists ===
- Barry Ward (actor), stage and screen actor
- Gavin James (singer), singer-songwriter and musician.
- Kojaque (hip-hop artist), rapper and producer.

=== Politicians ===
- Paschal Donohoe, born 1974

=== Broadcasters ===
- Gareth O'Callaghan, born 1961

== See also ==
- Education in the Republic of Ireland
