= 2020 Dublin county football team season =

Dublin county football team
2020 season
- Manager: Dessie Farrell
- Stadium: Parnell Park, Donnycarney
- NFL D1: 2nd (runner-up)
- All-Ireland SFC: Winners
- Leinster SFC: Winners

The following is a summary of Dublin county football team's 2020 season. It was a first season in charge for newly appointed Dublin manager Dessie Farrell. The season was suspended in March 2020 due to the COVID-19 pandemic. The season resumed in mid-October of the same year.

== Competitions ==
=== National Football League Division 1 ===
==== Table ====
Pos	Team	Pld	W	D	L	PF	PA	PD	Pts	Qualification
1	Kerry (C)	7	5	1	1	133	112	+21	11	National Football League champions
2	Dublin	7	4	2	1	126	112	+14	10	
3	Galway	7	4	0	3	128	127	+1	8 (Note: Head-to-head result: Galway 2-25 – 0-12 Tyrone.)	
4	Tyrone	7	4	0	3	109	126	−17	8	
5	Donegal	7	3	1	3	117	109	+8	7	
6	Monaghan	7	2	2	3	113	114	−1	6	
7	Mayo (R)	7	2	1	4	122	123	−1	5	Relegation to 2021 NFL Division 2
8	Meath (R)	7	0	1	6	103	128	−25	1	Relegation to 2021 NFL Division 2

Updated to match(es) played on 24 October 2020. Source: GAA.ie
Rules for classification: 1) League points 2) Where only two teams are involved, the outcome of the meeting of the two teams in the competition 3) Scoring Difference 4) Highest Total Score For 5) A Play-Off.
(C) League champions; (R) Relegated

==== Reports ====
25 January 2020 1	Dublin	1-19 (22) – (22) 1-19	Kerry	Drumcondra, Dublin
19:15 GMT (UTC+0)				Venue: Croke Park
		Report		Referee: Sean Hurson (Tyrone)

1 February 2020 2	Mayo	0-08 (08) – (14) 1-11	Dublin	Castlebar
19:00 GMT (UTC+0)				Venue: MacHale Park
		Report		Referee: Barry Cassidy (Derry)

8 February 2020 3	Dublin	1-15 (18) – (18) 1-15	Monaghan	Drumcondra, Dublin
19:00 GMT (UTC+0)				Venue: Croke Park
				Referee: Ciaran Branagan (Down)

22 February 2020 4	Dublin	1-15 (18) – (17) 1-14	Donegal	Drumcondra, Dublin
19:00 GMT (UTC+0)				Venue: Croke Park
		Report		Referee: Maurice Deegan (Laois)

29 February 2020 5	Tyrone	1-10 (13) – (10) 1-07	Dublin	Omagh
19:15 GMT (UTC+0)				Venue: Healy Park
				Referee: Cormac Reilly (Meath)

17 October 2020 6	Dublin	1-20 (23) – (19) 0-19	Meath	Donnycarney, Dublin
19:00 IST (UTC+1)				Venue: Parnell Park
				Referee: Brendan Cawley (Kildare); TV: eir Sport

25 October 2020 7	Galway	0-15 (15) – (21) 2-15	Dublin	Salthill
14:00 GMT (UTC+0)				Venue: Pearse Stadium
				Referee: David Coldrick (Meath); TV: TG4

=== Leinster Senior Football Championship ===
The draw for the preliminary rounds and quarter-finals was released by Leinster GAA on 7 October 2019. In a change to previous years' championships, a separate draw for the semi-finals was due to take place once the quarter-final ties had been played. However, due to the impact of the COVID-19 pandemic on Gaelic games and the resultant rescheduling of the 2020 All-Ireland Senior Football Championship, the draw for the semi-finals was made on 26 June 2020.

==== Fixtures ====
7 November 2020; 18:15; Quarter-final	Dublin	0-22 - 0-11	Westmeath	O'Moore Park, Portlaoise; Attendance: 0 Referee: Martin McNally (Monaghan); Man of the Match: Ciarán Kilkenny (Castleknock)
7 November 2020; 18:15; Quarter-final	Dean Rock 0-7 (0-6f), Ciarán Kilkenny 0-5, Sean Bugler and Paddy Small 0-2 each, Eoin Murchan, Jonny Cooper, Robbie McDaid, James McCarthy, Niall Scully, Con O’Callaghan 0-1 each	Report	John Heslin 0-3 (0-2f), Ray Connellan, Luke Loughlin, Kieran Martin (0-1m) 0-2 each, Ronan O’Toole and Jack Smith 0-1 each	O'Moore Park, Portlaoise; Attendance: 0 Referee: Martin McNally (Monaghan); Man of the Match: Ciarán Kilkenny (Castleknock)

15 November 2020; 15:30; Semi-final	Dublin	2-23 - 0-7	Laois	Croke Park; Attendance: 0 Referee: Ciaran Branagan (Down); Man of the Match: Ciarán Kilkenny (Castleknock)
15 November 2020; 15:30; Semi-final	Ciarán Kilkenny 1-4, Cormac Costello 0-7 (0-3f, 0-1m, 1 '45), Brian Fenton 0-4, Sean Bugler 1-0, Niall Scully 0-3, Dean Rock 0-2 (0-1f, 1 '45), Robbie McDaid, Paddy Small, Con O'Callaghan 0-1 each	Report	Paul Kingston and Gary Walsh (0-1f) 0-2 each, Brian Byrne, Evan O'Carroll (0-1m), Ross Munnelly (0-1f) 0-1 each	Croke Park; Attendance: 0 Referee: Ciaran Branagan (Down); Man of the Match: Ciarán Kilkenny (Castleknock)

21 November 2020 Final	Meath	0-09 (9) – (30) 3-21	Dublin	Dublin
19:00 GMT (UTC+0)		(HT: 0-02 - 2-12)		Venue: Croke Park
	Pts: J Morris 4 (1f); B Menton 1, C O'Sullivan 1, J Scully 1; T O'Reilly 1 (f); J Wallace 1 (m).	Report	Gls: D Rock 1, S Bugler 1, N Scully 1. Pts: D Rock 7 (5f, 1 '45'); C Kilkenny 4; P Small 3 (2m); C O'Callaghan 2; S Bugler 2, J Small 1; P Mannion 1 (f), N Scully 1.	Referee: Derek O'Mahoney (Tipperary); Attendance: 0 TV: RTÉ

==== Bracket ====
Preliminary round
Carlow	0-20
Offaly	3-14
Wexford	0-11
Wicklow	2-09
Louth	1-07
Longford	1-09

Quarter-finals
Offaly	0-16
Kildare	0-20
Wicklow	0-07
Meath	7-14
Longford	1-14
Laois	1-16
Westmeath	0-11
Dublin	0-22

Semi-finals
Kildare	0-15
Meath	5-09
Laois	0-07
Dublin	2-23

Final
Meath	0-09
Dublin	3-21

=== All-Ireland Senior Football Championship ===
RTÉ
Sky Sports

5 December 2020
17:30 GMT (UTC+0)
Semi-final

Report

Dublin	1–24 (27) – (12) 0–12	Cavan
(HT: 0–12 – 0-07)
Gls: R McDaid 1 Pts: D Rock 6 (2f); C Kilkenny 4 (1m), C O’Callaghan 4, B Fenton 4; R McDaid 2, P Small 2 (1f); B Howard 1, C Costello 1.		Pts: M Reilly 3; O Kiernan 2; J Smith 1, R Galligan 1, C Brady 1, G McKiernan 1 (f), C Conroy 1 (f), C Madden 1, J Smith 1.

Croke Park, Dublin
Referee: Ciaran Branagan (Down)
Attendance: 0 (Note: The game was played behind closed doors due to the impact of the COVID-19 pandemic on Gaelic games.)

RTÉ
Sky Sports

19 December 2020
17:00 GMT (UTC+0)
Final

Report

Dublin	2–14 (20) – (15) 0–15	Mayo
(HT: 2-06 – 0–10)
Gls: D Rock 1, C O'Callaghan 1. Pts: D Rock 4 (fs); C Kilkenny 3; C O'Callaghan 1, S Bugler 1, P Small 1, N Scully 1, B Fenton 1, P Mannion 1 (f), B Howard 1.		Pts: C O’Connor 9 (5fs, 2ms); R O’Donoghue 2; O Mullen 1, C Loftus 1, S Coen 1 (m), D Coen 1.

Croke Park, Dublin
Referee: David Coldrick (Meath)
Attendance: 0

== Management team ==
As of December 2020:

- Manager: Dessie Farrell
- Selectors: Shane O'Hanlon, Mick Galvin, Brian O'Regan
- Coach: Darren Daly
- Physiotherapists: James Allen, Niall Barry, Kieran O'Reilly
- Analysis team: Stephen Behan, John Courtney, Frankie Roeback, Ciarán Toner
- Kitmen: David Boylan, John Campbell
- Performance development coach: Bryan Cullen
- Media manager: Seamus McCormack
- Goalkeeping coach: Josh Moran
- Team doctors: Kieran O'Malley, Diarmuid Smith
- Sports therapists: Richard Daly, Paul Donnelly
- Nutritionists: Daniel Davey, Neil Irwin
- Cameraman: Chris Farrell
- Logistics: David Hendrick
- Development gym coach: Shane Malone
- Gym coach: Tommy Mooney
- Performance consultants: Brendan Murphy, Seán Murphy
