= Prendeville =

Prendeville (also spelled Prindiville, Prindeville, Prenderville, or Prendiville) is a surname of Irish Norman origins. The name is found predominantly in County Kerry, Ireland, the family being centred in the town of Castleisland, although like many other surnames, the Irish diaspora has spread it around the world. It is thought to derive from the Norman surname, de Frondeville.

== Notable individuals with this surname ==
- Andrew Prendeville, American indy racing driver
- Colin Prenderville, Gaelic footballer
- Kieran Prendiville, television script writer, best known for the series Ballykissangel (brother of Paddy Prendiville)
- Neil Prendeville, presenter on the radio station Red FM in Cork
- Paddy Prenderville, editor of The Phoenix, Irish satirical magazine
- Redmond Prendiville, Catholic archbishop of Perth

== See also ==
- Prendergast (surname)
