= Steve O'Shaughnessy =

Steve or Stephen O'Shaughnessy may refer to:

- Steve O'Shaughnessy (cricketer) (born 1961), English cricketer
- Steve O'Shaughnessy (footballer) (born 1967), Welsh footballer and manager
- Stephen O'Shaughnessy (Gaelic footballer), Gaelic footballer for Dublin
