= Bernard Brogan =

Bernard Brogan may refer to:

- Bernard Brogan Snr (born 1953), Dublin footballer of the 1970s
- Bernard Brogan Jnr (born 1984), Dublin footballer of the 2000s–2010s
