= Barry Cahill =

Barry Cahill may refer to:

- Barry Cahill (Gaelic footballer) (born 1981), Gaelic footballer for Dublin
- Barry Cahill (actor) (1921–2012), Canadian-born American actor
