= Coman Goggins =

Dublin Gaelic footballer

Personal information
- Native name: Comán Ó Gógáin (Irish)
- Born: Dublin, Ireland

Sport
- Sport: Gaelic football
- Position: Left half-back
Club
- Years: Club
- ?–: Ballinteer St John's
Club titles
- Dublin titles: 0
- Leinster titles: 0
Inter-county
- Years: County
- 2000–2007: Dublin
Inter-county titles
- Leinster titles: 4
- All Stars: 1

Coman Goggins is an Irish former Gaelic footballer who played for the Ballinteer St John's club and the Dublin county team. His club's first player to play for the Dublin senior team, he captained Dublin to the 2002 Leinster SFC title, won an All Star and also played international rules football.

Goggins went to school in Coláiste Eoin, Stillorgan. He is therefore a fluent Irish speaker.

Coman was the only Dublin player to receive an All-star in 2001, although, this came as a great honour in a year in which Dublin collected no silverware. In the same year he was selected to play Inter-Provincial football for Leinster along with his Dublin team-mate Ciarán Whelan. He was on Dublin's 2002, 2005 and 2006 Leinster Senior Football title winning sides. Goggins was appointed Captain for Dublin in the 2002 Senior Football Championship by the then new, Dublin Senior Football manager, Tommy Lyons. In 2003, his luck began to change and he was a surprise omission from the Dublin squad. Surprisingly Dublin forward Collie Moran was selected in his place. He has been in fine form in 2006 particularly during the league campaign where he excelled at centre half back. During the 2006 championship he lined up in his favoured wing back position and played a pivotal role although at times he looked very unsure on the ball. Goggins played in Dublin's last game in the 2006 Championship, an All-Ireland semi-final defeat at the hands of Mayo. Goggins was named on the 2006 Dublin Bus/Evening Herald Blue Star football XV at left half-back. He won the 2007 O'Byrne Cup for Dublin against Laois at O'Connor Park in Offaly. The game finished on a scoreline of 1-18 to 2-13 against Laois.

He announced his retirement from the inter-county scene at the start of the 2008 season. He has since worked as a GAA analyst for both RTÉ and TG4.

Sporting positions
| Preceded by Dessie Farrell | Dublin Senior Football Captain; 2002 | Succeeded by Ciarán Whelan |
