= Bryan Cullen =

Irish Gaelic footballer

Personal information
- Native name: Brían Ó Cuilinn (Irish)
- Born: 7 April 1984 (age 42) Dublin, Ireland
- Occupation: Physio
- Height: 1.8 m (5 ft 11 in)

Sport
- Sport: Gaelic football
- Position: Left half-forward
Club
- Years: Club
- 2001–: Skerries Harps
Club titles
- Dublin titles: 1
College
- Years: College
- DCU
College titles
- Sigerson titles: 2
Inter-county*
Years	County	Apps (scores)
2003–2015	Dublin	55 (0–36)
Inter-county titles
- Leinster titles: 9
- All-Irelands: 2
- NFL: 2
- All Stars: 0
- *Inter County team apps and scores correct as of 9 January 2015.

Bryan Cullen (born 7 April 1984) is an Irish former Gaelic footballer who played as a left wing-forward at senior level for the Dublin county team. Cullen announced his retirement on 9 January 2015. He stated 'I would like to extend my sincere thanks to Dublin managers Tommy Lyons, Pillar Caffrey, Pat Gilroy and Jim Gavin and especially to all the Dublin players past and present that I had the pleasure of sharing the pitch with.'

Cullen made his first appearance for the team during the 2003 championship and has become a regular player over the last few seasons. During that time he has won two All-Ireland winner's medals and six Leinster winner's medals. In 2011 Cullen captained the team to the All-Ireland title, beating Kerry in the final.

At club level, Cullen plays with Skerries Harps.

Cullen is also studying for a PhD at Dublin City University.

== Playing career ==
=== Inter-county ===
At Minor level, Cullen was part of the Dublin side that won the 2001 Leinster Minor Football Championship. With the Dublin Under 21 team, he won the Leinster Under 21 Championship three times, and the All-Ireland Under 21 Championship once. His brother Graham was also on the All-Ireland Under 21 winning team.

Cullen was called up to the Dublin Senior team in 2003, and made his League debut against Armagh in February 2003. He made his Championship debut later that year against Louth. In 2005, he won a Leinster Senior Football Championship medal with Dublin; defeating Laois in the final, with Cullen scoring three points. He scored eight points in total in that year's Leinster and All-Ireland Championships.

Cullen was cited after the controversial 2006 National League clash between Dublin and Tyrone. A game in which resulted in disciplinary action being taken against nine players involved in the game. Cullen was suspended for four weeks in accordance with Rules 140 and 138, which deals with physical contact. Cullen along with Dublin's Ciarán Whelan, Alan Brogan and Kevin Bonner were all exonerated from all charges along with the Tyrone trio of Kevin Hughes, Michael McGee and Owen Mulligan. The official reason given for the exoneration was stated as 'a technicality'. Owing to the regular Dublin captain Collie Moran's prolonged injury, Cullen captained Dublin to victory against Laois in the 2006 Leinster semi-final. He also captained the team for most of the 2006 Leinster final, although Moran made his long-awaited return to the Dublin team in time to deliver the winning speech. Dublins two captains stood shoulder to shoulder holding the Delaney Cup after an easy win over Offaly in the match. Cullen continued to captain Dublin against Westmeath in the All-Ireland quarter-final and Mayo in the semi-final despite Moran's return to fitness. Cullen was nominated for an All Star award in the half-back line for his 2006 performances. He missed out on the All Star, but was named half-back on the 2006 GPA Team of the Year.

Cullen came on as a substitute in the 2007 O'Byrne Cup final against Laois at O'Connor Park in Offaly. Dublin won the game 1–18 to 2–13. The 2007 National League saw Dublin being relegated to Division 2. In that year's Championship, Dublin won the Leinster Championship again, before being knocked out of the All-Ireland Championship be Kerry at the semi-final stage.

Cullen was on Dublin's 2008 O'Byrne Cup winning team - defeating Longford in the final. Later in the year, he won a fourth consecutive Leinster Championship medal with the county, before being beaten by Tyrone in the All-Ireland quarter-final stage.

Cullen guided Dublin to victory as captain in their opening match of the 2011 Leinster Senior Football Championship against Laois. He scored a point in the game in what proved to be a facile win of 1–16 to 0–11 at Croke Park. Dublin advanced to face Kildare in the semi-final of the Leinster championship. Dublin became won against the lilywhites with a controversial free in the dying minutes of the game. Cullen scored a point in the game and continued his unbeaten run in the championship as team captain in a game that finished on the scoreline 1–12 to 1–11. Cullen continued his trend of a point a game against Wexford in the Leinster final. Dublin won the 2011 Leinster senior football championship with a disappointing performance against a strong Wexford side. The game finished with James McCarthy's goal proving the difference between the sides. The game finished 2–12 to 1–12.

In a repeat of the previous years quarter final, Dublin were drawn against Tyrone. Unlike last year, Dublin pulled off a hugely convincing victory over Tyrone with Diarmuid Connolly dominating the scoring and Cullen continuing his trend of a point a game. Dublin won the game by a margin of seven points with the Croke park clash ending 0–22 to 0–15. Dublin progressed to the semi-final against a very defensive Donegal side. Cullen scored again and Dublin won the game in a low-scoring affair ending sixteen years of absence from the all-Ireland final. The semi final against Donegal finished 0–08 to 0-06 and was a game that led to a final against a much fancied Kerry team. Cullen captained Dublin to all-Ireland victory at a packed Croke Park. With seven minutes remaining, Kerry were leading by four points and a victory looked all but certain for the Kingdom. Once substitute Kevin McManamon scored a goal for Dublin, it was clear that Dublin were not beaten. In the dying minutes of the game, goalkeeper Stephen Cluxton kicked a free over the bar to give Dublin a dramatic victory against a stunned Kerry side. The game finished 1–12 to 1-11 giving Cullen the honour of being the first Dubliner to lift the Sam Maguire cup since 1995.

Two years later, goalkeeper Stephen Cluxton succeeded Cullen as Dublin captain in 2013.

=== International Rules ===
Cullen has represented Ireland in the International Rules Series in 2004, 2005 and 2008 which Ireland won in 2004 and 2005. He was not selected for the team that lost to Australia in 2010.

=== Province ===
Cullen has played for Leinster in the Railway Cup.

=== School / college ===
Cullen was captain of DCU when they won the Sigerson Cup for the first time ever in 2006. In doing so, Cullen became the first Dublin player to captain a Sigerson winning team. Cullen won his second Sigerson Cup medal in 2010 when DCU defeated UCC in the final.

== Honours ==
- All-Ireland Senior Football Championship (2): 2011, 2013
- Leinster Senior Football Championship (9): 2005, 2006, 2007, 2008, 2009, 2011 (c), 2012 (c), 2013, 2014
- National Football League (2): 2013, 2014
- All-Ireland Under-21 Football Championship (1): 2003
- Leinster Under-21 Football Championship (3): 2002, 2003, 2005
- Sigerson Cup (2): 2006, 2010
- Dublin Intermediate Football Championship (1): 2011
- Leinster Minor Football Championship (1): 2001
- International Rules (1): 2008

== Coaching career ==
=== Leinster Rugby ===
After the 2011 All-Ireland Senior Football Championship Final, Cullen was offered the role of coaching Leinster Rugby's academy players.

== Personal life ==
Cullen married to Cork native, Ailis McSweeney in January 2013, who is the current holder of the Irish record for the 100m sprint.

Awards and achievements
Preceded by Graham Canty (Cork)	All-Ireland SFC winning captain 2011	Succeeded by Michael Murphy (Donegal)

Sporting positions
Preceded by David Henry	Dublin Senior Football Captain; 2011 – 2012	Succeeded by Stephen Cluxton
