= Transplant surgeon =

Surgeon specializing in organ transplantation

A transplant surgeon is a surgeon who performs organ transplants. Among the many organs that can be transplanted are: kidneys, livers, hearts, lungs, the pancreas, the intestine (especially the small intestine), and recently, faces, tracheal (windpipe) tissue, and penises.

== Medical training ==
Training in the U.S. involves the four years of the undergraduate education, four years of medical school, five years of general surgery residency, followed by a two-year fellowship in transplant surgery.

== Notable surgeons ==
- Thomas Starzl – first human liver transplants. Often quoted as the “father of modern transplantation”
- Theodor Kocher – first modern transplant
- James D. Hardy – first successful lung transplant
- Bruce Reitz – first successful heart-lung transplant
- Patrick Soon Shiong – first encapsulated human islet transplant
- David Hickey – trained under Starzl, this sportsman was described by the Irish Independent in 2021 as "one of the world's most eminent transplant surgeons"

== See also ==
- Transplant surgery
