= Stephen O'Shaughnessy (Gaelic footballer) =

Irish Gaelic footballer

Stephen O'Shaughnessey
Personal information
- Native name: Stiofán Ó Seachnasaigh (Irish)
- Nicknames: Shaugho (pronounced shocko)
- Born: Galway, Ireland

Sport
- Sport: Gaelic football
- Position: Left Corner Back
Club
- Years: Club
- ?-present: Lucan Sarsfields
Inter-county**
| Years | County | Apps (scores) |
| 2005–2008 | Dublin | 13 (0–2) |
Inter-county titles
- Leinster titles: 3
- **Inter County team apps and scores correct as of 10:40, 11 February 2008 (UTC).

Stephen O'Shaughnessy is a Gaelic footballer who plays for the Lucan Sarsfields club and at senior level for the Dublin county team.

== Inter-county ==
O'Shaughnessy made his debut for Dublin in 2005. He proved an important asset to the Dublin team in the absence of former Dublin captain, Paddy Christie, who was out due to injury. O'Shaughnessy met the same fate when he too had to drop out of the championship due to a shoulder injury. However, he returned to play in the Leinster final and All-Ireland quarter-final defeat to Tyrone. He was nominated for an All-Star later that year.

Due to a recurrence of a shoulder injury O'Shaughnessy missed the entire 2006 league campaign. He was expected to return to the Dublin side after Dublin's first championship match against Longford, although he did not return until Dublin's victory in the 2006 Leinster Senior Football Championship final against Offaly.

He came on as a substitute in the 2007 O'Byrne Cup final for Dublin against Laois at O'Connor Park in Offaly. The game finished on a scoreline of 1–18 to 2–13 against Laois. He was yet to make a championship appearance for Dublin in 2007.

O'Shaughnessy played in all of Dublin's 2008 O'Byrne Cup games, including scoring a point in the semi-final against Carlow. He was on Dublin's winning team for the 2008 O'Byrne Cup winning team which defeated Longford in the final. He also played in Dublin's first two wins in the championship over Louth and Westmeath before a hamstring injury keep him out of the Leinster Senior Football Championship final.
