= David Henry (Gaelic footballer) =

Irish hurler and Gaelic footballer

Personal information
- Native name: Daithí Mac Éinrí (Irish)
- Born: Raheny, Dublin

Sport
- Sport: Gaelic football
- Position: Right half-back
Club
- Years: Club
- Raheny
Inter-county
- Years: County
- 2002–2011: Dublin
Inter-county titles
- Leinster titles: 7
- All-Irelands: 1

David Henry is a Gaelic footballer who played at senior level for the Dublin county team and plays his club football for Raheny. Henry played at right half-back, featuring on the Leinster SFC-winning side in 2005, 2006, 2007 and 2008. He came on as a substitute and was later sent off in the O'Byrne Cup final for Dublin against Laois at O'Connor Park in Tullamore. The game finished on a scoreline of 1–18 to 2–13. David was on Dublin's 2008 O'Byrne Cup winning team, which defeated Longford in the final.

He also played senior hurling with Dublin. David has worked as an analyst for Irish language television station TG4. He also worked as a youth leader at Coláiste Árainn Mhóir in Donegal in the summer holidays during college, assisting in teaching Irish to teenagers.

David was part of the Dublin panel that beat Kerry by 1–12 to 1–11 in the 2011 All-Ireland Senior Football Championship final.

David went to NUI Maynooth as a hurler under their GAA scholarship programme.

| Preceded by Paul Griffin | Dublin Senior Football Captain; 2010–2011 | Succeeded by Bryan Cullen |
