= Eamon Heery =

Dublin Gaelic footballer

Personal information
- Native name: Éamon Ó hÍorua (Irish)
- Born: Dublin, Ireland

Sport
- Sport: Gaelic football
- Position: Left half-back
Inter-county
- Years: County
- Dublin
Inter-county titles
- Leinster titles: 5
- NFL: 2
- All Stars: 1

Eamon Heery is a former Gaelic footballer who played for the Dublin county team. He was awarded an All Star for his performances with Dublin in 1992. He won an All-Ireland Minor Football Championship medal with Dublin in 1982.
