= Gay O'Driscoll =

Irish hurler and Gaelic footballer

Personal information
- Native name: Gaibriél Ó Drisceoil (Irish)
- Born: 1946 (age 79–80) Clonakilty, County Cork, Ireland
- Occupation: Retired company director
- Height: 6 ft 0 in (183 cm)

Sport
- Sport: Gaelic football
Club
- Years: Club
- St Vincent's
Club titles
- Dublin titles: 10
- Leinster titles: 2
- All-Ireland Titles: 1
Inter-county
- Years: County
- 1966–1979: Dublin
Inter-county titles
- Leinster titles: 6
- All-Irelands: 3
- NFL: 2
- All Stars: 2

Denis Gabriel "Gay" O'Driscoll (born 1946) is an Irish former Gaelic footballer. His championship career at senior level with the Dublin county team spanned thirteen seasons from 1966 until 1979.

Born in West Cork, O'Driscoll was the son of a Royal Navy serviceman. He moved with his family to Marino in Dublin at an early age where he attended Scoil Mhuire and St Joseph's Secondary School in Fairview.

O'Driscoll first played competitive football with the St Vincent's club and had much success in a career which spanned three decades. The highlight of his club career was in 1976 when he won an All-Ireland medal with the club. O'Driscoll also won two Leinster medals and ten county senior championship medals.

O'Driscoll first appeared on the inter-county scene as a hurler at minor and under-21 levels with Dublin. An All-Ireland runner-up in the under-21 grade in 1967, he enjoyed an eight-year career with the Dublin senior team. In spite of never having played minor or under-21 football, O'Driscoll made his senior debut during the 1966–67 league. Over the course of the following thirteen seasons he enjoyed much success and won three All-Ireland medals between 1974 and 1977. He also won six successive Leinster medals and two National League medals. He is the grandfather of Louis O’Driscoll
