= Paddy Gogarty =

Irish Gaelic footballer

Personal information
- Native name: Pádraig Mag Fhógartaigh (Irish)
- Born: Dublin, Ireland

Sport
- Sport: Gaelic football
- Position: Corner forward
Club
- Years: Club
- ?-?: Raheny
Inter-county
- Years: County
- 1969-1977: Dublin
Inter-county titles
- Leinster titles: 4
- All-Irelands: 2
- All Stars: 0

Paddy Gogarty is a former Gaelic football corner forward for the Dublin county team. He played his club football for Raheny. Paddy won an All-Ireland Senior Football Championship medal with Dublin in 1976. He won a National Football League medal with Dublin in during the same year.
