= Eric Lowndes =

Dublin Gaelic footballer (born 1994)

Personal information
- Native name: Eiric na Leamhna (Irish)
- Born: 1994 (age 31–32) Dublin, Ireland
- Occupation: Teacher

Sport
- Sport: Gaelic football
- Position: Right corner-back
Club
- Years: Club
- St Peregrine's
Club titles
	Football	Hurling
Dublin titles	0	0
Inter-county
- Years: County
- 2014–: Dublin
Inter-county titles
- Leinster titles: 6
- All-Irelands: 4
- NFL: 4
- All Stars: 0

Eric Lowndes (born 1994) is an Irish Gaelic footballer. His league and championship career as a corner-back at senior level with the Dublin county team has lasted four seasons since 2014.

Lowndes made his debut on the inter-county scene when he was selected for the Dublin minor teams as a dual player in 2011. After back-to-back All-Ireland defeats with the hurlers, he ended his minor career as an All-Ireland medal winner with the footballers in 2012. He subsequently joined the Dublin under-21 team and won an All-Ireland medal in this grade in 2014. Lowndes made his senior debut during the 2014 league. Since then he has won three successive All-Ireland medals. Lowndes has also won four Leinster medals and three National League medals.

== Honours ==
Dublin

- All-Ireland Senior Football Championship (3): 2015, 2016, 2017
- Leinster Senior Football Championship (4): 2014, 2015, 2016, 2017
- National Football League (4): 2014, 2015, 2016, 2018
- All-Ireland Under-21 Football Championship (1): 2014
- Leinster Under-21 Football Championship (2): 2014, 2015
- All-Ireland Minor Football Championship (1): 2012
- Leinster Minor Football Championship (2): 2011, 2012
- Leinster Minor Hurling Championship (2): 2011, 2012
