= Keith Galvin =

Irish Gaelic footballer

Personal information
- Native name: Ceiteach Ó Gealbháin (Irish)
- Born: Dublin, Ireland
- Height: 1.8 m (5 ft 11 in)

Sport
- Sport: Gaelic football
- Position: Left Corner Back
Club
- Years: Club
- St Sylvester's
Inter-county
- Years: County
- 1995-2001: Dublin
Inter-county titles
- Leinster titles: 1
- All-Irelands: 1

Keith Galvin is a former Gaelic footballer. He played for the St Sylvester's club and for the Dublin county team.

== Playing career ==
Galvin made his debut for Dublin in April 1995 against Armagh. 1995 went on to be a hugely successful year for Galvin as he was on Dublin's All-Ireland final winning team who defeated Tyrone Tyrone. He has represented Dublin at U21 and Minor level, captaining the Dublin U21 side in 1996. Galvin still plays his club football with St Sylvesters and won the Malahide club's first Dublin Senior football Championship title in 1996. Galvin's inter-county career was interrupted after a serious illness in 1998. He went on to play in Dublin loss to Meath in the 1999 Leinster final. He eventually called time on his Dublin career in 2001.
