= Cian O'Sullivan =

Dublin Gaelic footballer

Personal information
- Native name: Cian Ó Súilleabháin (Irish)
- Born: 27 March 1988 (age 38) Dublin, Ireland
- Occupation: Tax Director

Sport
- Sport: Gaelic football
- Position: Centre Back
Club
- Years: Club
- Kilmacud Crokes
Club titles
- Dublin titles: 3
- Leinster titles: 2
- All-Ireland Titles: 1
Inter-county
- Years: County
- 2009–2021: Dublin
Inter-county titles
- Leinster titles: 10
- All-Irelands: 8
- NFL: 5
- All Stars: 3

Cian O'Sullivan (born 27 March 1988) is a Gaelic footballer who plays for the Kilmacud Crokes club and previously at senior level for the Dublin county team.

== Playing career ==
=== Club ===
O'Sullivan won his first Dublin Senior Football Championship medal for Kilmacud Crokes in 2008. He won a Leinster Senior Club Football Championship medal and an All-Ireland Senior Club Football Championship medal in 2009. He won a second Dublin title and a Leinster title in 2010 and a third Dublin title in 2018.

=== Inter-county ===
O'Sullivan made his inter-county debut for Dublin in 2009.

He won his first All-Ireland Senior Football Championship with Dublin in September 2011, defeating Kerry in the final at Croke Park.

He won the National Football League with Dublin 2013 playing in midfield at Croke Park against Tyrone. The game finished on a scoreline of 0–18 to 0–17. On 22 September 2013, he started in midfield for the All Ireland Final. He was a key performer in the game ultimately moving to corner back following an injury to Jonny Cooper in Dublin's defeat of Mayo on a scoreline of 2–12 to 1–14. He won his first all star at centre back following displays of versatility throughout the year.

O'Sullivan was crucial to Dublin's success in 2015. Following defeat to Donegal in 2014, manager Jim Gavin deployed him as a "sweeping centre back", responsible for shoring up Dublin's defense against leaking goals. He became the lynchpin of Dublin's team with his reading of the game, calmness in possession and athleticism key to Dublin conceding only 4 goals in their 7 championship games played, of which Dublin kept 4 clean sheets. Despite suffering a hamstring injury in the final minutes of the semi-final replay defeat of Mayo, O'Sullivan started the final where Dublin defeated reigning champions Kerry 0–12 to 0-09, playing just over an hour of the game. He received his second All Star award at centre back.

He was again a key performer in 2016 as Dublin retained both their National League and Leinster titles. He also played a key role as the Dubs defeated Mayo by a single point after a replay on a scoreline of 1–15 to 1–14 to retain the Sam Maguire Cup.

In 2017, Dublin were narrowly defeated in the National League final by Kerry by a single point. They then went on to win a record 7 Leinster titles in a row. On 17 September, O'Sullivan was heavily involved as Dublin claimed a historic 3 in a row All Ireland titles with another narrow 1–17 to 1–16 victory against Mayo. Having been outplayed in the first half, the Dubs turned the game around to win a thrilling game courtesy of a 75th minute Dean Rock free. O'Sullivan won his third all star following his displays.

In June 2021, O'Sullivan announced his retirement from inter-county football.

== Honours ==
Dublin

- All-Ireland Senior Football Championship (8): 2011, 2013, 2015, 2016, 2017, 2018, 2019, 2020
- Leinster Senior Football Championship (10): 2011, 2012, 2013, 2014, 2015, 2016, 2017, 2018, 2019, 2020
- National Football League (5): 2013, 2014, 2015, 2016, 2018

Kilmacud Crokes

- Dublin Senior Football Championship (3): 2008, 2010, 2018
- Leinster Senior Club Football Championship (2): 2008, 2010
- All-Ireland Senior Club Football Championship (1): 2009

Individual

- All Star (3): 2013, 2015, 2017
