= Paul Casey (Gaelic footballer) =

Irish Gaelic footballer

Personal information
- Native name: Pól Ó Cathasaigh (Irish)
- Born: 14 October 1981 (age 45) Dublin, Republic of Ireland
- Height: 1.8 m (5 ft 11 in)

Sport
- Sport: Gaelic Football
- Position: Right half back
College
- Years: College
- DCU
College titles
- Sigerson titles: 1
Inter-county
- Years: County
- 2001-2012: Dublin
Inter-county titles
- retired titles: 7
- All-Irelands: 1

Paul Casey (born 14 October 1981) is an Irish Gaelic footballer who played for the Dublin county team and played for Lucan Sarsfields before retiring.

He is a wing-back. He captained Dublin during their Leinster Minor Football victory in 1999 and also won an under 21 medal in 2002. He made his league debut for Dublin in 2002 against Offaly. Casey's father was a Munster Minor Football Championship winner with Kerry in 1968. Paul has won seven Leinster Senior Football Championship medals with Dublin in 2002, 2005, 2006, 2007, 2009, 2011 and 2012, four as a starter and three as a panelist. He won a 2006 Sigerson Cup medal with DCU with a win over Queens University Belfast and was vice captain on this winning team. Captain was current Dublin teammate Bryan Cullen. Paul also won a Leinster minor medal in 1999, and an Under 21 Leinster medal in 2002. Paul was on Dublin's winning team for the 2008 O'Byrne Cup winning team which defeated Longford in the final.

Paul Casey was on the Leinster and all-Ireland winning panel for Dublin in 2011. He made his championship debut for Dublin in 2002 against Carlow in the Leinster Championship at Dr Cullen Park, Alan Brogan and Barry Cahill also made their debut the same day. He retired from inter county football in October 2012. He got engaged to long-term girlfriend the following month November 2012. They plan on getting married the end of 2013.
