= Colin Prenderville =

Irish Gaelic footballer

Colin Prendeville
Personal information
- Native name: Coilín de Prionnbhíol (Irish)
- Born: Dublin, Ireland

Sport
- Sport: Gaelic football
- Position: -
Club
- Years: Club
- ? - Present: Fingal Ravens
Inter-county
- Years: County
- Present: Dublin

Colin Prendeville is an Irish Gaelic footballer who plays for the Dublin county team. He won the 2007 O'Byrne Cup for Dublin against Laois at O'Connor Park in Offaly. The game finished on a scoreline of 1-18 to 2-13 against Laois. Colin won a Dublin Intermediate Club Football Championship title and a Leinster Intermediate Club Football Championship title with Fingal Ravens in 2007. In 2008, Prendeville won an All-Ireland Junior Football Championship medal while playing for Dublin.
