= Eoghan O'Gara =

Dublin Gaelic footballer

Personal information
- Native name: Eoghan Ó Gadhra (Irish)
- Born: 24 September 1985 (age 41) Dublin, Ireland
- Occupation: Sales executive
- Height: 6 ft 2 in (188 cm)

Sport
- Sport: Gaelic football
- Position: Full Forward
Clubs
- Years: Club
- ?–2022 2022–: Templeogue Synge Street; Shelmaliers
College
- Years: College
- DCU
College titles
- Sigerson titles: 1
Inter-county
Years	County	Apps (scores)
2008–2019	Dublin	44 (10-21)
Inter-county titles
- Leinster titles: 9
- All-Irelands: 7
- NFL: 5

Eoghan O'Gara (born 24 September 1985) is a Gaelic footballer who played as a forward at senior level for the Dublin county team. O'Gara attended St. Josephs BNS primary school in Terenure.

== Playing career ==
O'Gara made his Championship debut for Dublin coming on at half-time in place of Kevin McManamon. He had an immediate impact on the game, causing trouble for the Wexford defence in Dublin's comeback in the Leinster quarter final. O'Gara made a substitute appearance for Dublin in the Leinster semi-final defeat to Meath, which proved to be Dublin's biggest defeat ever to their rivals. This ended Dublin's five-year reign as Leinster champions.

Dublin and O'Gara went on to play in the qualifiers at the second round stage. O'Gara scored his first inter county point for Dublin against Tipperary in the second round of the 2010 qualifiers at Croke Park. O'Gara scored a 2–01 in Dublin's victory over Leinster finalists Louth in the final round of the qualifiers at Croke Park. This was O'Gara's highest scoring game for Dublin and his first Championship goal. O'Gara scored a crucial goal against Tyrone during the 2010 All-Ireland quarter final victory. O'Gara scored 3–2 in the 2010 All-Ireland Senior Football Championship.

On 5 November 2019, O'Gara officially confirmed his retirement from inter-county football.

In 2022, he transferred to Wexford GAA club Shelmaliers, his fiancé Elaine's club.

== Honours ==
- Leinster Senior Football Championship (9): 2008, 2011, 2012, 2013, 2014, 2015, 2016, 2017, 2018
- All-Ireland Senior Football Championship (7): 2011, 2013, 2015, 2016, 2017, 2018, 2019
- National Football League (5): 2013, 2014, 2015, 2016, 2018,
