= Bobby Doyle (Gaelic footballer) =

Dublin Gaelic footballer

Personal information
- Native name: Roibeard Ó Dúghaill (Irish)
- Born: Dublin, Ireland

Sport
- Sport: Gaelic football
- Position: Corner forward
Club
- Years: Club
- 1968–1982: St Vincent's
Inter-county
- Years: County
- 1972–1980: Dublin
Inter-county titles
- Leinster titles: 6
- All-Irelands: 3
- All Stars: 2

Bobby Doyle is a former Gaelic footballer who played for the Dublin county team. Renowned more as a hurler, he made his name with the Dublin football team as a free-running and free-scoring forward.

== Career ==
Doyle won All-Ireland senior medals with Dublin in 1974, 1976 and 1977. He also won two National Football League meals. And he was on the St Vincent's team that won the All-Ireland Club title in 1976.

Doyle played soccer with Malahide United F.C.

== Personal life ==
Bobby is the father of Ronan Doyle. He became a full member of Clontarf Golf Club.
