= David Hickey (Gaelic footballer) =

Irish Gaelic footballer, rugby union player and selector

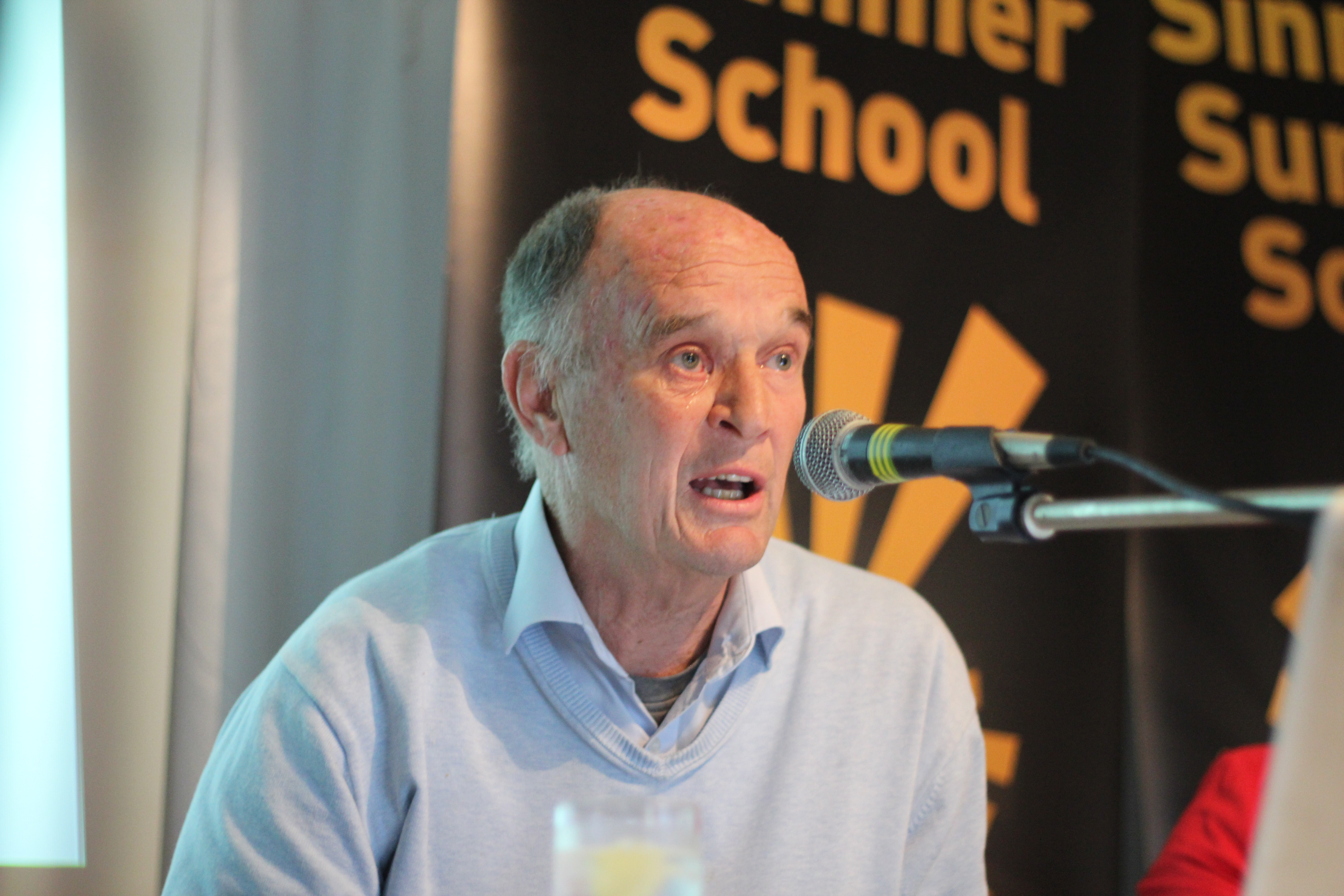
- Hickey in 2015

Personal information
- Native name: Daithí Ó hÍcí (Irish)
- Born: Dublin, Ireland

Sport
- Sport: Gaelic football
- Position: Half-forward
Club
- Years: Club
- Raheny
Inter-county
- Years: County
- 1969–: Dublin
Inter-county titles
- All-Irelands: 3
- All Stars: 2

David Hickey is a former Gaelic footballer and selector (both with the Dublin county team) and semi-professional rugby union player. With Dublin he played as wing-forward, with French rugby union club Stade Rochelais as full-back.

A consultant urologist by profession and director of transplantation at Beaumont Hospital, Dublin, the Irish Independent has described Hickey as "one of the world's most eminent transplant surgeons".

== Early life ==
Hickey studied medicine at University College Dublin (UCD). His training was at Jervis Street Hospital and the Richmond Surgical Hospital in the Northside suburb of Grangegorman, as well as with Thomas Starzl in the U.S. state of Pittsburgh.

Hickey was interested in rugby union, specifically the French variety, from a young age. His father, Patrick, was a Waterpark RFC player.

== Playing career ==
Hickey first featured for Dublin at the age of 17, and was the only footballer in a medical class dominated by rugby players. He appeared in six consecutive All-Ireland Senior Football Championship finals during the 1970s, winning three of them and receiving two All-Stars. His All-Ireland winning years were 1974, 1976 and 1977. His two All-Stars for Dublin were in 1974 and 1976. He also won two National Football League medals with Dublin in 1976 and 1978.

Offaly, on their way to three consecutive Leinster Senior Football Championship titles, ended Dublin's run of All-Ireland finals by defeating them in the 1980 All-Ireland Senior Football Championship. Hickey joined the then semi-professional French rugby union club Stade Rochelais, where he spent two years, after an agreement was reached through rugby commentator Pierre Salviac. The club's president, who also happened to be a local councillor and surgeon, allowed Hickey to continue his medical training with him in the operating theatre. He was given his own apartment and learned what he later described as a sort of "aristocratic French". He left the club because his surgical training programme required him to be in Ireland but said he would never have returned to his own country if he had been studying another subject. He later told the Irish Independent: "There's a harbour lined with cafes, restaurants and bars and they're lovely people. I had a really wonderful time there, really, really loved it". Hickey, the club's first signing from abroad, received the Freedom of the City of La Rochelle. Clontarf were invited to France to play a game against Stade Rochelais to commemorate the end of Hickey's time there. He invited his old French rugby teammates to Ireland for the 2019 All-Ireland Senior Football Championship final (drawn game), having introduced them to Gaelic football through repeated viewings of the 1977 Dublin and Kerry All-Ireland semi-final while travelling to rugby games across France.

Hickey, upon his return to Ireland, was first sent to Waterford. There he played one season of rugby for Waterpark. He was tipped to become a selector for the Dublin football panel, replacing Paul Nugent ahead of the 2010 football season. As of 2011, he was still a Dublin selector.

== Personal life ==
Hickey lives in Portmarnock.

He is a consultant urologist by profession and director of transplantation at Beaumont Hospital, Dublin. According to the Irish Independent, Hickey is "one of the world's most eminent transplant surgeons". In early 2011, he spent time working in Sudan.

In September 2024, Hickey spoke about a swelling in his mouth and what he described as a "small ulcer" on his gums and how this had led a to a diagnosis of oral cancer. This came in 2018, with Hickey also having survived sinus cancer earlier in his life.
