= Jim Ronayne (footballer) =

Irish Gaelic footballer

Personal information
- Born: Clontarf, Dublin

Sport
- Sport: Gaelic football
- Position: Midfield
Club
- Years: Club
- 20: Clontarf
Inter-county
- Years: County
- 1979-1989: Dublin
Inter-county titles
- Leinster titles: 4
- All-Irelands: 1

Jim Ronayne (born 28 February 1959) is a former Gaelic footballer who played for the Clontarf club and for the Dublin county team.

Ronayne made his debut for the Dublin senior football team in the 1979 Leinster Senior Football Championship final against Offaly. He won an All-Ireland Senior Football Championship medal in 1983 when a twelve-man Dublin team, dubbed the ‘Twelve Apostles’, defeated Galway in the final. In total he won four Leinster Senior Football Championship medals in 1979, 1983, 1984, and 1985, and an under 21 Leinster Football Championship medal in 1980. He won a National Football League medal with Dublin in 1987 beating Kerry 1-11 to 0-11 in the final.

During his career, Ronayne played for Dublin in four All-Ireland Senior Football Championship finals, eight Leinster Senior Football Championship Finals, two National Football League Finals, one Under-21 All-Ireland Football Championship Final, one Leinster Minor Football Championship Final and one Dublin Senior Football Championship Final with Clontarf.
