= Kieran Duff =

Dublin Gaelic footballer

Personal information
- Native name: Ciarán Ó Duibh (Irish)
- Nickname: Dully
- Born: 14 February 1961 (age 65) Dublin, Ireland
- Height: 6 ft 0 in (183 cm)

Sport
- Sport: Gaelic football
- Position: Right wing-forward
Club
- Years: Club
- Fingallians
Club titles
- Dublin titles: 0
Inter-county
Years	County	Apps (scores)
1980–1992	Dublin	40 (9–57)
Inter-county titles
- Leinster titles: 4
- All-Irelands: 1
- NFL: 2
- All Stars: 2

Kieran Duff (born 14 February 1961) is an Irish former Gaelic footballer. His league and championship career at senior level playing for the Dublin county team spanned thirteen seasons from 1979 to 1992.

Born in Dublin, Duff first played competitive Gaelic football during his schooling. He later joined the Fingallians club and won a county junior championship medal in 1993.

Duff made his debut on the inter-county scene at the age of seventeen when he was picked on the Dublin minor team. He won a Leinster medal in this grade in 1979. Duff later joined the Dublin under-21 team, winning a Leinster medal in 1980. By this stage he had joined the Dublin senior team, making his debut during the 1979-80 league. Over the course of the next thirteen seasons Duff won one All-Ireland medal in 1983. He also won four Leinster medals, two National Football League medals and two All-Stars. He retired from inter-county football during the 1991-92 league.

Duff also played association football for Swords Celtic and Shelbourne, making his League of Ireland debut as a substitute on 8 December 1985.

In retirement from playing Duff became involved in team management and coaching. He was a selector with the Dublin senior team under Paul Caffrey.

== Honours ==
=== Team ===
Fingallians

- Dublin Junior Football Championship (1): 1993

Dublin

- All-Ireland Senior Football Championship (1): 1983
- Leinster Senior Football Championship (4): 1983, 1984, 1985, 1989
- National Football League (2): 1986-87, 1990-91

=== Individual ===
Awards

- All-Stars Awards (2): 1987, 1988
