= Darren Homan =

Irish Gaelic footballer

Personal information
- Native name: Darran Ó hEoghamáin (Irish)
- Born: 31 December 1974 (age 51) Dublin, Ireland

Sport
- Sport: Gaelic football
- Position: Midfield
Clubs
- Years: Club
- St Kevin's Killians; Ballyboden St Enda's; Round Towers
Inter-county
- Years: County
- 1997-2005: Dublin
Inter-county titles
- Leinster titles: 1

Darren Homan is a former Gaelic footballer from Kilnamanagh, Tallaght. He played for the Dublin county team.

== Football career ==
Homan retired in 2005 from the Dublin senior football panel after the 2005 quarter-final against Tyrone due to injury. He left Ballyboden St Enda's to join Round Towers in Clondalkin, although it was announced that he would rejoin Ballyboden for the next season. Prior to his first spell with Ballyboden, he had played club football with St Kevin's of Kilnamanagh.

Homan is an electrician by trade and is a firefighter in the Dublin Fire Brigade.
