= Paul Bealin =

Dublin Gaelic footballer

Personal information
- Born: 1967 or 1968 (age 58–59) Dublin, Ireland
- Occupation: Account Manager

Sport
- Sport: Gaelic football
- Position: Midfield
Clubs
- Years: Club
- Ballyboden St Enda's; St Kevins
Club titles
- Dublin titles: 1
Inter-county
- Years: County
- Dublin
Inter-county titles
- All-Irelands: 1
- NFL: 1

Paul Bealin (born 1967/1968) is a former Gaelic footballer who played in midfield at senior level for the Dublin county team. He later managed three senior county teams: Westmeath (sacked after a year), Wexford (resigning in October 2007) and Carlow (after two years at the helm), as well as clubs in several counties.

Bealin is the key account manager for Baro Lighting, in Dundrum, in Dublin 14.

== Playing career ==
Bealin is most remembered for his performances in his All-Ireland Senior Football Championship winning year with Dublin in 1995, in which he partnered Brian Stynes in midfield. Paul Caffrey, the former Dublin senior football manager, was quoted as saying: "Paul Bealin is a great Dub and nobody needs to tell me that. A lot of people have great memories of him from his great years as well as 1995".

He also won a National Football League title with Dublin in 1993. Bealin famously guided Ballyboden St Enda's to their first Dublin SFC title in 1995 as player-manager.

== Managerial career ==
Bealin managed Ballyboden St Enda's up until 2003. He then managed Wicklow GAA club Blessington in 2004. He then took a position as manager of Cavan GAA club Mullahoran for two seasons in 2004 and 2005, guiding Mullahoran to two successive county finals which they lost to Cavan Gaels.

Bealin succeeded Pat Roe as Wexford senior football team manager in 2005, with Roe having stepped down after that year's championship.

Bealin was also Carlow senior football team manager but stepped down after one year in charge.

Bealin briefly managed the Westmeath senior football team between 2013 and 2014. He had been managing Dublin GAA club Parnells at the time of this appointment.

In September 2013, Bealin was appointed as the Westmeath senior football team manager, succeeding Pat Flanagan. However, the clubs sacked him from the position (also after one year), though Bealin blamed the players for not wanting him.

He managed a Wicklow GAA club at intermediate football for the 2019–20 season.
