= Paul Griffin (Gaelic footballer) =

Irish Gaelic footballer

Personal information
- Native name: Pól Ó Gríofa (Irish)
- Born: Stillorgan, Dublin, Ireland
- Height: 1.8 m (5 ft 11 in)

Sport
- Sport: Gaelic football
- Position: Left Corner Back
Club
- Years: Club
- 2000-: Kilmacud Crokes
Club titles
- Dublin titles: 4
- Leinster titles: 3
- All-Ireland Titles: 1
Inter-county
- Years: County
- 2004-2011: Dublin
Inter-county titles
- Leinster titles: 6
- All-Irelands: 1
- NFL: 0
- All Stars: 0

Paul Griffin is an Irish Gaelic footballer. He was educated at Oatlands College, Stillorgan, and University College Dublin, where he graduated in Physiotherapy. He plays for club side Kilmacud Crokes and plays left full-back for the Dublin county team, although he started his Dublin career in the half-back line. He has been one of Dublin's most consistent performers since making his Dublin debut in 2004. He has won the Leinster senior football championship with Dublin on two occasions in 2005 and 2006. He was on the Kilmacud Crokes side that won the 2006 Leinster Senior club football championship. He has won the Dublin club football championship with the Crokes on two occasions, 2004 and 2005. Paul Griffin captained Dublin's U-21 football side in 2004. Griffin was nominated for a 2006 all-star award. Griffin was named on the 2006 Dublin Bus/Evening Herald Blue Star football XV at right half-back. He won the 2007 O'Byrne Cup for Dublin against Laois at O'Connor Park in Offaly. The game finished on a scoreline of 1-18 to 2-13 against Laois. In April 2009 he was named by Dublin football manager Pat Gilroy as captain for the 2009 season. He played hurling for Dublin up to minor level but eventually he committed to football.

== Honours ==
He won the Leinster Minor football championship with Dublin in 2001. Griff has won five Leinster Senior Football Championship medals, one All-Ireland U-21 Football Championship and two Leinster U-21 Football Championship medals. At club level he has won the All-Ireland Senior Club Football Championship, two Leinster Senior Club Football Championship, three Dublin Senior Football Championship and one Dublin Junior D Football Championship medals. He also won a county division one championship medal with Crokes in 2008, one Leinster Colleges' Hurling championship, one U-16, U-21 and minor football championships too.

Preceded by Alan Brogan	Dublin Senior Football Captain; 2009-2010	Succeeded by David Henry
