= Robbie Kelleher =

Dublin Gaelic footballer

Personal information
- Native name: Roibeard Ó Céileachair (Irish)
- Born: Dublin, Ireland

Sport
- Sport: Gaelic football
- Position: Left full-back
Club
- Years: Club
- ?–?: Scoil Uí Chonaill
Inter-county
- Years: County
- 1969–?: Dublin
Inter-county titles
- Leinster titles: ?
- All-Irelands: 4
- All Stars: 4

Robbie Kelleher is a former Gaelic footballer who played for the Dublin county team. He is All-Ireland winning.

== Biography ==
He grew up in Glasnevin, County Dublin. He was educated at Coláiste Mhuire, where he excelled in his studies which included an A in Higher Level Mathematics. He went on to study economics at University and has a successful career in that field.

== Playing career ==
Kelleher has won four All Stars for his performances for Dublin in 1978, 1977, 1975 and 1974, a feat yet to be matched by any left full back. He won three all-Ireland medals for Dublin in 1977, 1976, 1974. The 1974 won his first All-Ireland in a game in which Dublin defeated Galway by a scoreline of 0–14 to 1–6. His second all-Ireland with Dublin in 1976 with a 3–8 to 0–10 victory over Kerry. 1977 proved the most memorable of years for Kelleher. Dublin won the semi-final and just one week before the final Robbie Kelleher married his wife in San Francisco returning in time for the all-Ireland final victory over Armagh. The game finished on a scoreline of 5–12 to 3-6 and he was later awarded an all star for his performances. The day before the game the newspapers famously read on the day before the final Wife of Star Flies in for Match.

He won the National Football League with Dublin 1978 and 1976. 1979 proved a very disappointing year for Kelleher as he suffered very serious injuries. 'That was the year he broke his leg, two operations, screws inserted and the long haul back to fitness for the championship'. Despite expressing his desire to retire in 1979 at the age of 28, the then Dublin manager Kevin Heffernan convinced him to make a return to the Dublin side. He retired in 1981 at the age of 31.
