= Fingal Ravens GAA =

Gaelic games club in County Dublin, Ireland

Fingal Ravens
- Raibíní Fhine Gall
- Founded: 1926
- County: Dublin
- Nickname: Ravens and Hoops
- Colours: Black and White
- Grounds: Rolestown
- Coordinates: 53°30′13.80″N 6°18′17.75″W

Playing kits
Standard colours

Fingal Ravens is a Gaelic Athletic Association club based in Rolestown, County Dublin, Ireland. Fingal Ravens won the 2007 Dublin Intermediate Football Championship and are therefore in the Senior championship for 2008. The Senior team won the Dublin Intermediate Football Championship in 2007 and booked a place in the Leinster Intermediate Semi Final against Suncroft. The Senior team won the Lenister Intermediate Semi Final on Sunday 25 November 2007 against Suncroft of Kildare. They eventually went on to the final against neighbours and local rivals Donaghmore/Ashbourne. It proved an interesting game because the Fingal Ravens manager Mick Deegan was a resident of Ashbourne in County Meath. Ravens won the IFC title with a goal to spare in Parnell Park on Sunday 9 December 2007. Fingal then went on to the All-Ireland Intermediate Club Football Championship semi final against Ballinagh of Cavan. Ravens won the semi against Ballinagh by 0–11 to 0–08 to seal their place in the 2008 all-Ireland intermediate club final.

Fingal Ravens went on to play the All Ireland Intermediate Club Football Championship Final in Croke Park, but didn't come home All Ireland Champions.

With all this success, 2007–2008 was the greatest in the club's history to date.

Ravens then went on to win AFL Division 2 in November 2008 and also securing promotion to Division 1.

== Roll of honour ==
- All-Ireland Intermediate Club Football Championship: Runners-Up 2008
- Leinster Intermediate Club Football Championship: Winners 2007–08
- Dublin Intermediate Football Championship: Winners 2007, Runners up 2022
- Dublin Junior Football Championship: Winners 1969, 1999
- Dublin Junior B Football Championship: Winners 2007, 2022
- Dublin Minor B Football Championship: Winners 2004
- Dublin Minor C Football Championship: Winners 2011
- Dublin AFL Division 2: Winners 2008, 2014
- Féile na nÓg 2019: Boys Division 12 Cup Final Winners (rep Dublin)
- Dublin AFL Division 6: Winners 2022
- Dublin AFL Division 5: Winners 2023
- Dublin U16 B Football Championship 2021: Finalists
- Dublin Minor B Football Championship: Winners 2022
- Dublin Minor Div 2 Football League: Winners 2023
- Dublin Minor A Football Championship : Semi Finalists 2023

== Notable players ==
Darren Daly
