= Frank McPhillips =

Irish Gaelic footballer

Personal information
- Native name: Proinsias Mac Philib (Irish)
- Born: Dublin, Ireland
- Occupation: Garda

Sport
- Sport: Gaelic football
- Position: Goalkeeper
Club
- Years: Club
- ?: ?
Inter-county
- Years: County
- ?: Dublin
Inter-county titles
- Leinster titles: 2
- All-Irelands: 1
- NFL: 0
- All Stars: 0

Frank McPhillips is a former Gaelic footballer who played at senior level for the Dublin county team.

== Playing career ==
McPhillips was a goalkeeper and was a member of the Dublin panel which won the All-Ireland Senior Football Championship in 1963. He collected 2 Leinster Senior Football Championship medals in 1962, '63 and he also won an All-Ireland Junior Football Championship medal in 1960. He won MacRory Cup with St Michael's Enniskillen in 1973.
