= Alan Larkin =

Irish Gaelic footballer

Personal information
- Native name: Ailéin Ó Lorcáin (Irish)
- Born: Dublin, Ireland
- Occupation: QFA

Sport
- Sport: Gaelic football
- Position: centreback
Club
- Years: Club
- Raheny
Inter-county
- Years: County
- ?–?: Dublin
Inter-county titles
- Leinster titles: ?
- All-Irelands: 2
- All Stars: 0

Alan Larkin is a former Gaelic footballer who played for the Raheny club and for the Dublin county team.

== Playing career ==
Larkin won his first all-Ireland SFC title in 1974, as part of the Dublin team that defeated Galway by 0–14 to 1–6. He won his second title in 1977, when Dublin defeated Armagh by 5–12 to 3–6. Larkin served as manager of the Dublin minor team and led them to an All-Ireland MFC in the 1980s.

== Post-football career ==
Larkin has worked for Ministers of the Word in Beaumont Hospital and in his own parish of Kilmore West. He coached a Dublin minor league team, which won the Leinster Championship in 1994. He is married to his wife, Rose, and together they have five children and several grandchildren.

He is part of a "Dublin 70s group" who meet for social events and organise reunions for teams on anniversaries.
