= Ross McConnell =

Irish Gaelic footballer

Personal information
- Born: Glasnevin, County Dublin
- Height: 6 ft 3 in (191 cm)

Sport
- Sport: Gaelic football
- Position: Midfield
Club
- Years: Club
- 2005–: St Oliver Plunketts/Eoghan Ruadh
Inter-county
Years	County	Apps (scores)
2007–2012	Dublin	32 (0-5)
Inter-county titles
- Leinster titles: 4
- All-Irelands: 1

Ross McConnell is an Irish Gaelic footballer who plays for the St Oliver Plunketts/Eoghan Ruadh club and for the senior Dublin county team. McConnell is 6'3" tall

== Playing career ==
=== Inter-county ===
McConnell made his league debut for Dublin against Limerick on Saturday 10 February 2007, in Dublin's first league win of the season. Dublin won the game by a scoreline of 0-14 to 1-10. He made his championship debut for Dublin against Meath in the quarter-final of the Leinster Senior Football Championship at Croke Park and played full back on the side which won the Leinster Senior football Championship on Sunday July 15. Ross was on Dublins winning team for the 2008 O'Byrne Cup winning team which defeated Longford in the final.

McConnell was sent off during the defeat to Cork in the 2010 All-Ireland semi-final.

== Family life ==
McConnell's father played with Meath in the 1970s, while his grandfather Kevin senior was an All-Ireland medal winner with Meath in 1949 and 1954.
