= Paddy Reilly (Gaelic footballer) =

Dublin Gaelic footballer

Personal information
- Native name: Pádraig Ó Raghallaigh (Irish)
- Born: Dublin, Ireland

Sport
- Sport: Gaelic football
- Position: -
Club
- Years: Club
- ?–?: St Margaret's
Inter-county
- Years: County
- 1972–?: Dublin
Inter-county titles
- All-Irelands: 2
- All Stars: 1

Paddy Reilly is a former Gaelic footballer who played for the Dublin county team. Reilly was awarded an All Star for his performances with Dublin in 1974. He won an All-Ireland medal with Dublin during his All Star year. His next and final All-Ireland medal came in 1977, where he appeared as a substitute.
