= Mick Deegan =

Irish Gaelic footballer (born 1964)

Personal information
- Native name: Mícheál Ó Duíginn (Irish)
- Born: Dublin, Ireland

Sport
- Sport: Gaelic football
- Position: Left half-back
Club
- Years: Club
- 1982–?: Erin's Isle
Club titles
- Dublin titles: 2
- Leinster titles: 1
Inter-county
- Years: County
- 1985–: Dublin
Inter-county titles
- Leinster titles: 9
- All-Irelands: 1
- All Stars: 1

Mick Deegan (born 1964) is a former manager of the Dublin junior Gaelic football team and Fingal Ravens. He is a former inter-county Gaelic footballer for Dublin, and a former footballer for Crusaders.

== Playing career ==
Mick won his first inter-county medal for Dublin in 1982 when Dublin won the All-Ireland Minor Football Championship. He went on to make his debut for the Dublin senior team in a National Football League game against Longford in 1985. In his 1991 all star year, he was on the victorious National football league Dublin team that defeated Kildare. He won his second NFL medal with Dublin in 1993, in a hard-fought final against Donegal. The game was brought to a replay which Dublin eventually won to win their 8th title.

He also won the All-Ireland senior football championship with Dublin in 1995. The game which finished on a scoreline of 1–10 to 0–12, was against Tyrone.

In the Dublin Senior Football Championship, Deegan had a successful club career with Erin's Isle. He appeared in his first Dublin championship in 1982, the same year in which he won an all-Ireland minor medal. Ballymun Kickhams went on to win the 1982 Dublin championship. He eventually won his first Dublin championship with Erin's Isle in 1993 by beating Kilmacud Crokes in the final. The next three consecutive finals resulted in losses to Kilmacud Crokes in 1994, Ballyboden St Enda's in 1995 and St Sylvester's, Malahide in 1996. He won his final championship with Erin's Isle in 1997. After the 1997 win, Erin's Isle went on to win the 1997 Leinster Senior Club Football Championship.

Deegan also had spells playing soccer for Tolka Rovers, and for Northern Irish club Crusaders, with whom he won the Irish Premier League title in 1995 and 1997. He played as a defender.

He is a garage proprietor by trade.

== Managerial career ==
He is the manager of Fingal Ravens and guided them to their first ever Dublin Intermediate Football Championship in 2007. This means that Ravens will play in the Dublin Senior Football Championship in 2008. He won the Leinster Intermediate Club Football Championship title as manager of Fingal Ravens on 9 December 2007. Deegan also manages the Dublin county junior football team, which won the All Ireland Junior Title in 2008.

He was a selector for the Dublin senior football team under Jim Gavin.
