= Kevin Bonner =

Irish Gaelic footballer

Personal information
- Native name: Caoimhín Ó Cnáimhsí (Irish)
- Born: Castleknock, County Dublin, Ireland

Sport
- Sport: Gaelic football
- Position: Forward
Club
- Years: Club
- ? - present: St Brigid's
Inter-county*
Years	County	Apps (scores)
2006 - present	Dublin	4 (0-2)
Inter-county titles
- Leinster titles: 5
- *Inter County team apps and scores correct as of (00:03, August 2006 (UTC)).

Kevin Bonner is a Gaelic footballer who has played for the Dublin county team. The son of Donegal footballing legend Seamus Bonner, he plays his club football for St Brigid's.

== Career ==
=== Early years: 2006 - 2008 ===
Bonner made his championship debut for Dublin against Longford in the quarter final against and continued in the starting line-up against Laois in the 2006 Leinster Senior Football Championship. He was on Dublin's winning side in the 2006 Leinster Senior Football Championship final. Although he made his first appearance for the Dublin Senior team against UCD in the O'Byrne Cup when Dublin defeated UCD by a scoreline of 2-15 to 2–7. he finished the game with a scoreline of 1-01. He went on to complete his first term in the O'Byrne Cup with a scoreline of 1-07 and he finished the 2006 National Football League with 0-01. Bonner received a suspension of eight weeks following the controversial 2006 National League match between Dublin and Tyrone, a game which resulted in disciplinary action against 9 players involved in the game. Kevin Bonner, Whelan, Bryan Cullen and Alan Brogan were all exonerated from all charges along with the Tyrone trio of Kevin Hughes, Michael McGee and Owen Mulligan. The official reason given for the exoneration was stated as 'a technicality'.

He won the 2007 O'Byrne Cup for Dublin against Laois at O'Connor Park in Offaly. The game finished on a scoreline of 1-18 to 2-13 against Laois. He scored the winning goal for Dublin in extra time. Bonner scored 1-06 for Dublin during their 2007 campaign in Division 1A. Bonner had his first appearance for Dublin in the Leinster Senior Football Championship against Laois at Croke Park. He was on the St Brigid's team who lost the Dublin SFC final in Parnell Park to St Vincent's (who eventually won the All-Ireland competition).

Kevin was on Dublin's winning team for the 2008 O'Byrne Cup winning team which defeated Longford in the final. Kevin scored 0-01 in the game which saw Dublin defeat Longford by 2-12 to 1-14 at Parnell Park.
