= Paddy Moran (Gaelic footballer) =

Irish Gaelic footballer

Personal information
- Native name: Pádraig Ó Móráin (Irish)
- Born: 28 May 1967 (age 59) Dublin, Ireland
- Height: 1.86 m (6 ft 1 in)

Sport
- Sport: Gaelic football
- Position: Right Corner Back
Club
- Years: Club
- Whitehall Colmcille
Club titles
- All-Ireland Titles: 1995
Inter-county
- Years: County
- 1990–1999: Dublin
Inter-county titles
- Leinster titles: 4
- All-Irelands: 1

Paddy Moran (born 28 May 1967) is a former Gaelic footballer who played for the Whitehall Colmcille club and for the Dublin county team, operating from full-back and centre-back. He was a member of the 1995 All-Ireland winning Dublin team. He won a National League in 1993 and 4 Leinster medals from 1992–1995.
