= Paddy Christie =

Dublin Gaelic footballer

Personal information
- Native name: Pádraig Mac Críosta (Irish)
- Born: 1976 (age 49–50) Dublin, Ireland
- Occupation: Primary school principal
- Height: 6 ft 0 in (183 cm)

Sport
- Sport: Gaelic football
- Position: Full-back
Club
- Years: Club
- 1995–2007: Ballymun Kickhams
Inter-county
- Years: County
- 1995–2007: Dublin
Inter-county titles
- Leinster titles: 3
- All Stars: 1

Patrick Christie (Irish: Pádraig Mac Críosta; born 1976 in Dublin) is an Irish Gaelic football manager and former player who tended to occupy the full-back position for his club Ballymun Kickhams and at senior level for the Dublin county team. He has been manager of the Longford county team since 2022.

== Playing career ==
=== Club ===
He won an Under 21 Championship with Ballymun Kickhams.

One of the highlights of his achievements at underage level was getting the triple with Ballymun Kickhams U-21 team by winning the Dublin Championship, the North League and then overall league winners in the same season. Although he has retired from inter-county and club football, he occasionally makes substitute appearances or starts for the Ballymun Kickhams club.

=== Inter-county ===
He made his inter-county senior debut for the Dublin against Armagh in April 1995.

He was selected in the 2002 GAA All Stars Awards team at full-back.

He won three Leinster Senior Football Championship medals, in 2002, 2005 and 2006. He collected a 2006 Leinster championship medal, despite not appearing in any of the matches.

He served as Dublin captain in 2005.

He built himself a "cult following" among Dublin supporters. Christie was expected to make his re-appearance in the Dublin full-back line during the first round of the 2007 National Football League. This changed however, when Christie retired and dedicated himself to completing his Masters at University.

== Managerial career ==
Long after retiring as a player he joined the Tipperary backroom management team led by David Power, which won the 2020 Munster Senior Football Championship, their first in 85 years.

In February 2021, he succeeded Tom McGlinchey as manager of the Tipperary under-20s.

In August 2022, he was appointed as manager of the Longford senior football team.

| Preceded by Ciarán Whelan | Dublin Senior Football Captain; 2005 | Succeeded by Colin Moran |
