= Declan Lally =

Irish Gaelic footballer

Personal information
- Native name: Déaglán Ó Maolalaidh (Irish)
- Born: Dublin, Ireland
- Occupation: Teacher

Sport
- Sport: Gaelic football
- Position: Left Half Forward
Clubs
- Years: Club
- 1988–2011 2012–: St Brigid's; St Oliver Plunketts/ER
Club titles
- Dublin titles: 1
- Leinster titles: 1
College
- Years: College
- DCU
College titles
- Sigerson titles: 1
Inter-county
- Years: County
- 2004–2012: Dublin
Inter-county titles
- Leinster titles: 5
- All-Irelands: 1

Declan Lally, or Déaglán Ó Maolalaidh, is an Irish Gaelic footballer who plays the left half forward position at senior level for the Dublin county team. Lally won 5 Leinster titles and one All Ireland title.

== Playing career ==
Lally was on the DCU side that won the 2006 Sigerson Cup winning player of the match in the final. He was also on the Dublin side that won the 2006 Leinster Senior Football Championship against Offaly. Lally was on the winning sides for Dublin in the U21 Leinster football championship finals against Longford (2003) and Wicklow (2002) scoring goals in both finals. The 2003 game was the first time since 1974–75 that Dublin won back to back Leinster U-21 football championship titles. Dublin went on to win the 2003 U21 All-Ireland football championship. Lally studied finance at NUI Maynooth and for his master's degree in Dublin City University. Lally was on the winning side for the 2006 Railway Cup victory for Leinster against Connacht which was played in Boston, Massachusetts, US. Lally was on Dublin's winning team for the 2008 O'Byrne Cup which defeated Longford in the final. At the beginning of April 2008 Lally decided to take a break from inter-county football and to travel. In 2007, he worked in Ladyswell National School before taking up a position with Bank of Ireland. Lally then played for McAnespies in Boston, USA winning both the Boston and North American championships for the club's second time ever. After spending a year in the UK, Lally returned to Ireland to win an All-Ireland with the Dublin football team and then as a primary school teacher at Mary Mother of hope senior national school.
