= Keith Barr (Gaelic footballer) =

Dublin Gaelic footballer

Personal information
- Native name: Ceiteach Ó Bairr (Irish)
- Born: 26 January 1968 (age 58) Dublin, Ireland

Sport
- Sport: Gaelic football
- Position: Centre Back
Club
- Years: Club
- Erin's Isle
Club titles
- Dublin titles: 2
- Leinster titles: 1
Inter-county
- Years: County
- 1989–1999: Dublin
Inter-county titles
- Leinster titles: 5
- All-Irelands: 1
- NFL: 1
- All Stars: 2

Keith Barr is a former Gaelic footballer who played for the Erin's Isle club and the Dublin county team.

== Sporting career ==
Barr made his inter county championship debut against Wicklow in 1989. Keith was on the 1995 All-Ireland winning team when Dublin narrowly defeated Tyrone. He won two National football league titles with Dublin, in 1991 and again in the National football league final replay against Donegal. Although, Barr had come on as a substitute against Donegal in 1993, he did not appear in the replayed game but still received his winners' medal. Barr received two All-Star awards, the first in 1991 and the second in Dublin's All-Ireland winning year. He also has a Compromise rules medals for Ireland's victory over Australia in 1990.

In 1991, Dublin had 3 draws in a row against Meath, a game which in Meath winning the fourth game by a scoreline of 2-10 to 0-15. It was claimed by Jimmy Keaveney, that Keith Barr's penalty miss was the turning point in the game. He was adamant that Barr had been instructed to take the point, but he went for glory and subsequently missed his chance. Although it is also claimed that the penalty miss was due to Mick Lyons of Meath running alongside Barr as he took the penalty, a penalty retake was never given.

Sporting positions
Preceded by John O'Leary	Dublin Senior Football Captain; 1997	Succeeded by Dessie Farrell
