= Senan Connell =

Irish Gaelic footballer from Dublin

Personal information
- Native name: Seanán Ó Conaill (Irish)
- Born: Dublin, Ireland
- Height: 5 ft 11 in (180 cm)

Sport
- Sport: Gaelic football
Clubs
- Years: Club
- 1997-? ?-1997: Na Fianna; Oliver Plunketts
Club titles
- Dublin titles: 3
- Leinster titles: 1
Inter-county
- Years: County
- ? - present: Dublin
Inter-county titles
- Leinster titles: 3

Senan Connell is an Irish Gaelic footballer who played for the Na Fianna club on Dublin's Northside and for the Dublin county team.

== Career ==
Senan operated in the half forward line for Dublin. He made his debut for Dublin in a national league match in 1998 against Offaly kicking two points. He cemented his place on the team before a cruciate ligament injury forced him to miss the league final versus Cork in 1999. Senan played at half forward in both the 2000 Leinster final loss to Meath and the 2001 Leinster final loss to Kildare under Tommy Carr. In 2002 Senan was again in the half forward line as Dublin had a breakthrough year beating Wexford, Meath and Kildare as they were crowned Leinster champions with Senan kicking two points in the final. Dublin were eventually undone in the 2002 All Ireland semi-final by eventual champions Armagh with Connell again kicking 2 points. Connell was a mainstay of the Lyons era, kicking five points against Kerry in the 2004 quarter-final loss, Lyons's last game in charge. Connell won two more Leinster titles during the Caffrey reign, in 2005 and 2006, operating mostly as an impact sub before retiring from inter-county football at the age of 32, following the crushing 2006 All Ireland semi-final loss to Mayo.

Connell won the Dublin football championship with his club Na Fianna in 1999 against St Brigid's and went on to win the Leinster Club football championship only to be eventually defeated in the All-Ireland club final against Crossmaglen Rangers of Armagh. He won two more Dublin senior football championship medals with Na Fianna in 2000 (v Kilmacud Crokes) and 2001 (v St Brigids) and Na Fianna made it to both Leinster Finals. Connell won the Man of the Match award in the 2001 final. His club pedigree was recognised with 5 Dub Star awards at wing back, centre forward and wing forward. Connell won the Player of the Tournament award in the 2003 All Ireland Kilmacud 7's on a day when Na Fianna were narrowly defeated by Aghada of Cork in the final. Connell still plays club football in the capital with Na Fianna and won a Dublin Senior League medal in 2012 beating St Sylvesters in the final.

== Club honours ==
- Dublin Senior Football Championship (3): 1999, 2000, 2001
- Leinster Senior Club Football Championship (1): 1999

== County honours ==
- Leinster Senior Football Championship (3): 2002, 2005, 2006

== Personal life ==
As of 2004, Connell was working as a schoolteacher while playing for Dublin GAA.
