= Darren Daly =

Irish Gaelic footballer (born 1987)

Personal information
- Native name: Dáire Ó Dálaigh (Irish)
- Born: 11 March 1987 (age 39) Abbeylea, Swords, Ireland
- Occupations: Health & Safety Advisor
- Height: 1.81 m (5 ft 11 in)

Sport
- Sport: Gaelic football
- Position: Left Corner Back
Club
- Years: Club
- 2005-: Fingal Ravens
Inter-county*
Years	County	Apps (scores)
2013-2020	Dublin	65+ (0-0)
Inter-county titles
- Leinster titles: 7
- All-Irelands: 6
- NFL: 5
- All Stars: 0
- *Inter County team apps and scores correct as of 23 August 2014.

Darren Daly (born 11 March 1987) is a Gaelic footballer who plays for the Fingal Ravens club and, formerly, for the Dublin county team.

In April 2013, Daly was part of the Dublin team that defeated Tyrone by 0–18 to 0–17 to win the 2013 National Football League, first league title since 1993. Daly made his Championship debut in June 2013 against Westmeath and came on as a substitute in the 2013 All-Ireland Senior Football Championship Final win against Mayo.
