= Jim Brogan (Gaelic footballer) =

Dublin Gaelic footballer

Personal information
- Native name: Séamus Ó Brógáin (Irish)
- Born: Dublin, Ireland

Sport
- Sport: Gaelic football
- Position: Left corner-back
Club
- Years: Club
- St Oliver Plunketts/Eoghan Ruadh
Inter-county
- Years: County
- Dublin
Inter-county titles
- All-Irelands: 2

Jim Brogan is an Irish former Gaelic footballer who played for the Dublin county team. Brogan won an All-Ireland SFC medal with Dublin in 1977 in a game in which he made an appearance as a substitute. Dublin beat Armagh in the final by 5–12 to 3–6. The following year he won an NFL title with Dublin in 1978. Brogan won an All-Ireland Minor Football Championship with Dublin in 1956 on the same team as Dublin footballing legend Lar Foley. Brogan is the uncle of former Dublin senior panelists Alan, Bernard Jnr and Paul and the brother of former senior footballer Bernard Snr.

Brogan was also a selector with the Dublin team who won the All-Ireland SFC title in 1995, being part of the management team made up of Pat O Neill and Fran Ryder all of whom have played for Dublin in the 1970s. Ahead of the 2009 season, he joined up as a selector with the Dublin under-21 football team, alongside co-selectors Shane O'Hanlon and Declan Darcy and manager Jim Gavin.
