= 2007 O'Byrne Cup =

Tournament details
- Province: Leinster
- Year: 2007
- Trophy: O'Byrne Cup

Winners
- Champions: Dublin (6th win)
- Manager: Paul Caffrey
- Captain: Colin Moran

The 2007 O'Byrne Cup was a Gaelic football competition played by the teams of Leinster GAA. The competition differs from the Leinster Senior Football Championship as it also features further education colleges.

== O'Byrne Cup ==
First round 6/7/9 January 2007
Longford	0-14
D.I.T.	2-09
Offaly	2-11
U.C.D.	2-06
Laois	1-11
Kildare	0-07
Louth	1-11
Meath	0-13
Wicklow	1-12
Carlow	2-06
Wexford
Dundalk I.T.
Westmeath	2-14
A.I.T	0-06
Dublin	3-14
D.C.U.	0-12

Quarter-finals; 13/14 January 2007
DIT	1-08
Offaly	2-13
Laois	0-13
Louth	0-12
Wicklow	0-07
Wexford	0-05
Westmeath	0-08
Dublin	2-11

Semi-finals; 20/21 January 2007
Offaly	3-08
Laois	2-12
Wicklow	1-05
Dublin	0-15

Final; 28 January 2007
Laois	2-13
Dublin	1-18

=== First round ===
The first round saw the withdrawal of Kilkenny who were then replaced by Dundalk IT. Dundalk IT later dropped out of the competition which means that Wexford go on to play in the quarter-final on January 4, 2007. The first match of the O'Byrne Cup was played between Carlow and Wicklow. It was a much anticipated game as it was the debut of the new Wicklow senior football manager Mick O'Dwyer. Wexford, Wicklow, DIT, Offaly, Laois, Louth, Westmeath and Dublin went on to play in the quarter-finals of the O'Byrne Cup. The teams that exited in the first round were Carlow, Longford, UCD, Kildare, Meath, Athlone IT, and DCU who went on to play in the O'Byrne Shield. Dundalk IT did not continue to the O'Byrne Shield as they dropped out of the competition at the O'Byrne Cup first round stage.

7 January 2007

Longford	0-14 - 2-09	DIT
	Report

Michael Fay Park
7 January 2007

Offaly	2-11 - 2-06	UCD
	Report

Tullamore
7 January 2007

Laois	1-11 - 0-07	Kildare

Portarlington
7 January 2007

Louth	1-09 - 0-12	Meath
	Report

Drogheda
6 January 2007

Wicklow	1-12 - 2-06	Carlow
	Report

Aughrim
7 January 2007

Wexford	Not Played	Dundalk IT

Tagoat
7 January 2007

Westmeath	2-14 - 0-06	Athlone IT

Mullingar
9 January 2007

Dublin	3-14 - 0-12	D.C.U.
	Report

Seán Moore Park
Ringsend

=== Quarter-finals ===
The teams that went on to the semi-final stage of the competition are Wicklow, Dublin, Offaly, Laois. The teams that exited at the quarter-final stage are Wexford, Westmeath, DIT, Louth. Unlike, the teams in the first round, the losing teams did not go on to play in the O'Byrne Shield, their loss means that they no longer took part in any O'Byrne competition in 2007.

14 January 2007

D.I.T.	1-08 - 2-13	Offaly
	Report

Tullamore
14 January 2007

Laois	0-13 - 0-12	Louth
	Report

Portarlington
13 January 2007

Wicklow	0-07 - 0-05	Wexford
	Report

Aughrim
14 January 2007

Westmeath	0-08 - 2-11	Dublin
	Report

Mullingar

=== Semi-finals ===
21 January 2007

Laois	2-12 - 3-08	Offaly
	Report

O'Connor Park
20 January 2007

Dublin	0-15 - 1-05	Wicklow

Aughrim Park

=== Final ===
28 January 2007

Laois	2-13 - 1-18 A.E.T.	Dublin
Fergal Byron, Cathal Ryan, Darren Rooney (Sent Off), Peter O’Leary, John Madigan, Kevin Fitzpatrick, Brian McCormack, Pádraig Clancy, Tom Kelly, Chris Bergin, Paul Lawlor, Gary Kavanagh, Michael John Tierney, Brian McDonald, Colm Parkinson		Stephen Cluxton, Paul Griffin, Niall O'Shea, Colin Prenderville, Coman Goggins, Colin Moran (Capt.), Ger Brennan, Darren Magee, Declan O'Mahony, Derek Murray, Diarmuid Connolly, David O'Callaghan, Kevin Bonner, Conal Keaney, Tomás Quinn

O'Connor Park
Attendance: 5000
Referee: Derek Fahy (Longford)

== O'Byrne Shield ==
Quarter-finals; 14 January 2007
Longford	2-16
U.C.D.	0-10
Kildare	3-09
Meath	1-11
Carlow
A.I.T.

Semi-finals; 21 January 2007
Longford	0-09
Kildare	1-05
Carlow	0-13
A.I.T.	2-10

Final; 30 January 2007
Longford	2-10
A.I.T.	1-07

=== Quarter-finals ===
The O'Byrne Shield involves the losing sides from the O'Byrne Cup. The quarter finals involved Longford, UCD, Meath, Kildare, Athlone IT, DCU, Dundalk IT and Carlow. Longford and Kildare qualified for the semi-finals by beating their respective opponents. Dundalk IT did not continue after dropping out of the O'Byrne Cup as replacements for Kilkenny, therefore their expected opponents Carlow qualified directly for the Shield semi final. DCU withdrew from the competition, conceding to Athlone IT and therefore Athlone IT continued to the semi without kicking a ball.

14 January 2007

Longford	2-16 - 0-10	U.C.D.
	Report

Ballymahon
14 January 2007

Kildare	3-09 - 1-11	Meath
	Report

Newbridge

=== Semi-finals ===
In the semi-finals, Longford defeated Kildare by a point in spite of having been reduced to 14 players before half time when their midfielder Liam Keenan was sent off for a second yellow card offence, while Athlone IT caused a surprise by beating Carlow by three points.

21 January 2007

Longford	0-09 - 1-05	Kildare

Longford (Pearse Park)
21 January 2007

Carlow	0-13 - 2-10	A.I.T.

Carlow

=== Final ===
30 January 2007

Longford	2-10 - 1-07	A.I.T.

Longford (Michael Fay Park)

== See also ==
- 2007 Dr McKenna Cup
