= Dermot Deasy =

Dublin Gaelic footballer

Personal information
- Native name: Diarmaid Mac an Déisigh (Irish)
- Born: Dublin, Ireland
- Height: 6 ft 2 in (188 cm)

Sport
- Sport: Gaelic football
- Position: Full back
Club
| Years | Club | Apps (scores) |
| ?-? | Ballymun Kickhams | ? |
Club titles
- Dublin titles: 2
Inter-county
| Years | County | Apps (scores) |
| | Dublin | ? |
Inter-county titles
- Leinster titles: 3
- All-Irelands: 1
- NFL: 1
- All Stars: 1

Dermot Deasy is a former Gaelic footballer who played for the Dublin county team. He won an all-star for Dublin in 1993, won the National Football League, won the Leinster Senior Football Championship and lost in the semi to eventual all-Ireland winners Derry. Despite not making an appearance in the 1995 all-Ireland final due to injury, Deasy got an all-Ireland medal as a member of the Dublin panel. Deasy won Dublin Senior Football Championship medals with Ballymun Kickhams in 1982 and 1985.

Deasy was born in August 1960 and first played Gaelic football in Sacred Heart BNS in Ballygall and then in St Kevin's Secondary School. His class and school team-mates included Dublin stars Barney Rock, Gerry Hargan, John Kearns and Anto McCaul. These players formed the backbone of Ballymun Kickhams SF team who first won the SF championship under Deasy's captaincy in 1982.

Deasy first played for Dublin under Kevin Heffernan in 1982 and played on and off under successive managers up to 1996. Deasy must be unique in that he has played for Dublin in all the centre spots from full-forward, centre-forward, mid-field, centre-half before finding his niche at full back from 1993 to 1996. He gained a regular spot at full-back at almost 33, an age most players retire. Ironically, he replaced the younger Gerry Hargan on Hargan's retirement.

During his three and a bit years at the top of Gaelic football, Deasy won four Leinster medals, one All Ireland Medal, received three All Star nominations, winning one. He also won one National Football League medal, also receiving the Man of the Match Award for keeping Tony Boyle, then Ireland's top forward, scoreless in the final and the replay.

Deasy remains heavily involved in the GAA and now referees at club level.
