= Brian Stynes =

Irish Gaelic and Australian rules footballer

Personal information
- Born: 29 September 1971 (age 55) Dublin, Ireland
- Height: 6 ft 3 in (191 cm)

Sport
- Sport: Gaelic football
- Position: Midfield
Club
- Years: Club
- ?–?: Ballyboden St Enda's
Club titles
- Dublin titles: 1
- Leinster titles: 0
Inter-county
- Years: County
- ?–?: Dublin
Inter-county titles
- Leinster titles: 2
- All-Irelands: 1
- All Stars: 1

Brian Stynes (born 29 September 1971) is an Irish sportsman who played Gaelic football for the Dublin county team and Australian rules football for Melbourne. He attended De La Salle College, Churchtown, Dublin.

== Playing career ==
=== Australian rules football ===
Stynes saw the success that his older brother Jim (who won the All-Ireland minor football championship with Dublin in 1984) had in Australian rules football's Australian Football League, and was recruited to his brother's club, Melbourne. He debuted in 1992 and at 190 cm was touted as a possible key position player, but his career in the AFL did not blossom, and he played only two games for no goals. In 1993, he played for Victorian Football Association club Port Melbourne, and was part of the club's losing 1993 Grand Final team.

=== Gaelic football ===
Brian Stynes was on Dublins winning team in the 1995 all-Ireland senior football championship against Tyrone at Croke Park. Stynes was awarded an allstar for his performances in 1995. Brian played his club football for Ballyboden St Endas.

=== Other ===
Stynes has since represented Ireland in the International Rules Series against Australia.

His brother David Stynes represented Ireland in Australian rules football at both the 2002 Australian Football International Cup (when Ireland won the cup) and also the 2005 Australian Football International Cup.
