= Mick Galvin =

Irish Gaelic footballer

Personal information
- Native name: Mícheál Ó Gealbháin (Irish)
- Born: Dublin, Ireland
- Height: 6f1"

Sport
- Sport: Gaelic football
- Position: -
Clubs
- Years: Club
- ? -?: St Oliver Plunketts; Na Fianna
Inter-county
- Years: County
- ?: Dublin
Inter-county titles
- Leinster titles: ?
- All-Irelands: 1
- All Stars: 0

Mick Galvin is a former Gaelic footballer who played for the Dublin county team and the St Oliver Plunketts club until they were relegated to the Dublin Intermediate Football Championship and then moved to Na Fianna where he won three Dublin Senior Football Championship medals as player and manager. Galvin returned to his former club St Oliver Plunketts/Eoghan Ruadh for the 2009 season. He took over the Plunketts post from Dermot Kelly who retired after leading he led Oliver Plunketts to the 2007 Dublin AFL Division One title and the 2008 Dublin Senior Football Championship final.

== Football career ==
He won an All-Ireland Senior Football Championship medal with Dublin in 1995. He won three National football league medals with Dublin in 1993, 1991 and in 1987.
