= Bernard Brogan Snr =

Dublin Gaelic footballer

Bernard Brogan
Personal information
- Native name: Bearnard Ó Brógáin (Irish)
- Nickname: Bernie
- Born: 24 September 1953 (age 73) Dublin, Ireland
- Occupation: retired
- Height: 6 ft 2 in (188 cm)

Sport
- Sport: Gaelic football
- Position: Midfield
Club
- Years: Club
- St Oliver Plunketts/Eoghan Ruadh
Inter-county
- Years: County
- Dublin
Inter-county titles
- All-Irelands: 3
- All Stars: 1

Bernard Brogan is a former Gaelic footballer who played for the St Oliver Plunketts/Eoghan Ruadh club and for the Dublin county team. He won three All-Ireland senior football medals in the 1970s.

== Playing career ==
Brogan, who mostly played midfield, received an All Star for his performances in 1979. In 1974 he was on the panel that won Dublin's first All-Ireland title since 1963; however, after being injured playing against Offaly in the Leinster Championship, he did not play in the All-Ireland semi-final or final. He was on the All-Ireland senior football winning side for Dublin in 1976 against rivals Kerry by a scoreline of 3–8 to 0–10. The following year he got the crucial goal when Dublin defeated Kerry in the All Ireland Football semi-final. A few weeks later he collected his third All Ireland medal when Dublin defeated Armagh by a scoreline of 5–12 to 3–6. Brogan also won two National Football League division one medals: in 1978 against Mayo and in 1976 when he appeared as a substitute against Derry. Bernard Snr is the father of former Dublin and St Oliver Plunketts footballers Paul, Bernard and Alan Brogan. His brother Jim Brogan also played for Dublin during the seventies.
