= Barry Cahill (Gaelic footballer) =

Dublin Gaelic footballer

Personal information
- Native name: Barra Ó Cathail (Irish)
- Born: 10 May 1981 (age 45) Dublin, Ireland

Sport
- Sport: Gaelic Football
- Position: Left half-back
Club
- Years: Club
- 1999–2016: St Brigid's
Club titles
- Dublin titles: 2
- Leinster titles: 1
Inter-county
- Years: County
- 2001–2012: Dublin
Inter-county titles
- Leinster titles: 8
- All-Irelands: 1
- All Stars: 1

Barry Cahill (born 10 May 1981) is a former Gaelic footballer who played for the St Brigid's club in Castleknock, the Dublin county team and his province, Leinster, during his playing career. Cahill announced his retirement from Dublin football in February 2013. He retired from St Brigid's in December 2016.

== Playing career ==
=== Inter-county ===
Cahill made his debut for the Dublin senior football team in 2001. He won his first Leinster Senior Football championship medal in 2002, beating Kildare in the Leinster final in Croke Park in front of over 80,000 spectators. Cahill was also on the Dublin team that defeated Laois to win the Leinster Senior Football Championship final in 2005 and again in 2006 against Offaly and again in 2007 against Laois.

He won his fifth Leinster title with Dublin in 2008, beating Wexford by 3–23 to 0–9 to set a new record for the biggest leinster final win with cahill scoring one point from wing back.

Cahill won his sixth leinster title (fifth consecutive) beating Kildare in the 2009 final. He scored a goal and one point from wing back with his goal being a contender for 'Goal of the Year'.

He won his 7th Leinster senior title against Wexford in July 2011 and his 8th Leinster senior title against Meath in 2012.

He was on the victorious Leinster Provincial team in 2005 that defeated Ulster in the Martin Donnelly Inter-Provincial final. He was also on the Leinster team in 2006 when they defeated Connaught in the 2006 final which was played in Boston.

He also captained the Dublin Under 21 team to Leinster glory in 2002. Cahill was awarded an All Star in October 2007 at the Vodafone All Stars Awards ceremony. He was also honoured with an Opel GPA award for being voted onto the GPA Team of the Year in 2007.

He won the All-Ireland Senior Football Championship in September 2011, when Dublin defeated Kerry at Croke Park. He was centre-forward on the team that day.

=== Club ===
Cahill won the Dublin Senior Football Championship with St Brigid's in 2011. In 2011, Cahill was named as the Dub Stars Footballer of the Year. He is now involved with the coaching of younger age groups in the club including minor football teams.

== Personal life ==
His current employment position is the Business Development Manager of the GAA/GPA. Barry holds a Finance/Economics degree (2002) and Computer Science Higher Diploma from UCD (2003), as well as an Executive MBA from DCU Business School in 2016.
