= Colin Moran (Gaelic footballer) =

Irish Gaelic footballer (born 1980)

Personal information
- Native name: Coilín Ó Móráin (Irish)
- Nickname: Collie
- Born: 6 June 1980 (age 46) Dublin
- Height: 6 ft 0 in (183 cm)

Sport
- Sport: Gaelic football
- Position: Centre Back
Club
- Years: Club
- 1997–2009: Ballyboden St Enda's
Inter-county
Years	County	Apps (scores)
1998–2009	Dublin	85 (5-59)
Inter-county titles
- Leinster titles: 5

Colin "Collie" Moran (born 6 June 1980) is a former Gaelic footballer who played for the Dublin county team. He was captain of the Leinster Senior Football Championship-winning Dublin teams in 2006 and 2007.

== Playing career ==
Moran made his senior inter-county debut in October 1998. He plays his club football for Ballyboden St Enda's. Moran broke his arm in a 2004 challenge match against Limerick in between two Championship games. Moran was on the winning side for Leinster against Ulster in the 2005 Railway Cup and repeated the feat, as captain, against Connacht in 2006 in Canton, Boston. He also represented Ireland in the International Rules Series against Australia.

Moran retired on 22 April 2009 as a result of a hip injury.

Preceded by Paddy Christie	Dublin Senior Football Captain; 2006–2007	Succeeded by Alan Brogan
