= 2010 Dublin Senior Football Championship =

Gaelic football competition

- 2010 Craobh Sinsear Peile; Bhaile Átha Cliath

Tournament details
- County: Dublin
- Year: 2010

Winners
- Champions: Kilmacud Crokes (7th win)
- Manager: Paddy Carr

Promotion/Relegation
- Promoted team(s): N/A
- Relegated team(s): N/A

Other
- Player of the Year: Brian Kavanagh

The 2010 Dublin Senior Football Championship is the inter club Gaelic football competition between the top teams in Dublin GAA. The first round draw was announced on 10 March 2010.

== First round ==
The winners of the first round progressed to the second round, the losers went on to a backdoor round with a chance to progress to the second round.

14 March 2010; Round 1	Ballinteer St. Johns	1–12 – 0–13	St Peregrines	Newcastle; Referee: J Turner (Thomas Davis)
14 March 2010; Round 1	F Ward 0–5 (0-4f), P O’Connor 0–4, C Judge 1–0, C Gormley 0–1, P O’Donnell 0–1, J McNally 0–1	Report	R McCarthy 0–7 (0-4f), S Lowndes, E Jennings 0–2 each, S Sweeney, C Lowndes 0–1 each	Newcastle; Referee: J Turner (Thomas Davis)

15 March 2010; Round 1	St Maurs	2–7 – 0–12	St Mary's Saggart	The Naul
15 March 2010; Round 1	M McGrath (1–0 pen), C Reddin 1–0 each, C Moore 0–4 (0-2f), D Carrick. C Maguire, C Carty (0-1f) 0–1 each	Report	D Marshall 0–5 (0-3f), E Murray 0–4 (0-2f), D Carrigan, 0–2 each, M Coyne 0–1	The Naul

12 March 2010; Round 1	O'Tooles	1–15 – 1–10	St Patrick's, Palmerstown	O'Toole Park; Referee: G McMahon (Kilmacud Crokes)
12 March 2010; Round 1	D Farrelly 1–5 (0-4f), G O’Meara 0–3, M Healy 0–2 (2f), R Walker, P O’Donoghue, A Morris, K Horgan, P Bradshaw 0–1 each.	Report	P Faughnan 0–5 (0-3f), D Rushe 1–1, J Kelly 0–3 (0-2f), S Stapleton 0–1.	O'Toole Park; Referee: G McMahon (Kilmacud Crokes)

14 March 2010; Round 1	Lucan Sarsfields	0–13 – 0–9	Clontarf	Russell Park; Referee: A Cummins (Round Tower, Clondalkin)
14 March 2010; Round 1	J Doyle 0–4 (0-4f), S O’Shaughnessy 0–3, D O’Shaughnessy, B O’Neill, T Brennan, B Gallagher, J O’Neill, N Flynn 0–1 each	Report	I O’Dwyer 0–6 (0-6f), C Johnson 0–2 (0-1f), D Mullins 0–1	Russell Park; Referee: A Cummins (Round Tower, Clondalkin)

12 March 2010; Round 1	St Marks	0–5 – 2–14	St Vincents	Balgriffin; Referee: P Fitzsimons (Liffey Gaels)
12 March 2010; Round 1		Report	G Brennan, A Baxter (0-2f) 1–2 each, P Lee 0–5 (0-2f, 0–1 ‘45’), C Dorney 0–2, C Mullins, N Mullins, M Loftus 0–1 e	Balgriffin; Referee: P Fitzsimons (Liffey Gaels)

12 March 2010; Round 1	St Brigids	2–10 – 0–15	Ballymun Kickhams	Parnell Park; Referee: K Roche (Whitehall Colmcilles)
12 March 2010; Round 1	Paddy Andrews 1–1, M Cahill (0-4f), K Darcy (0-3f) 0–4 each, B Cahill 1–0, D O’Connor 0–1.	Report	D Rock 0–6 (0-3f), K Leahy 0–3, T Furman 0–2, A Hubbard, E Reilly, Derek Byrne, David Byrne 0–1 each.	Parnell Park; Referee: K Roche (Whitehall Colmcilles)

12 March 2010; Round 1	St Anne's	3–7 - 0–10	Fingallians	St Margarets; Referee: G McCormack (Naomh Barróg)
12 March 2010; Round 1	N Bergin 2–1, D Walsh 1–1, C McKeown 0–2 (0-2f), J McMahon, J Kelly, C O’Gara 0–1 each.	Report	D Killeen 0–6 (6f), D Farrell 0–2, G Donnelly, P Flynn 0–1 each.	St Margarets; Referee: G McCormack (Naomh Barróg)

14 March 2010; Round 1	UCD	2–10 – 1–9	Thomas Davis	O'Toole Park; Referee: P Faughnan (St Patrick’s (P))
14 March 2010; Round 1	C Lyng 1–3 (0-2f), J O’Loughlin 1–1, D Kingston 0–3, K McGourty 0–2, L Smith 0–1	Report	S McGrath 0–4, S McKeon 1–0 (1–0 pen), C Farrelly 0–2, J O’Connor, N Brogan, P O’Connor (0-1f) 0–1 each	O'Toole Park; Referee: P Faughnan (St Patrick’s (P))

12 March 2010; Round 1	Fingal Ravens	0–7 – 1–20	St Oliver Plunkett's/Eoghan Ruadh	Parnell Park; Referee: D Deasy (Ballymun Kickhams)
12 March 2010; Round 1	D Daly 0–3, G Donoghue, I Kavanagh, W Finnegan (0-1f), N Tormey 0–1 each.	Report	B Brogan 1–9 (0-4f), J Sherlock 0–4, G Smith 0–3, A Brogan 0–2, P Brogan, A Darcy 0–1 each.	Parnell Park; Referee: D Deasy (Ballymun Kickhams)

14 March 2010; Round 1	Whitehall Colmcille	1–6 – 2–16	Na Fianna	Balgriffin; Referee: J Fagan (Erins Isle)
14 March 2010; Round 1	S Walsh 1–3 (0-1f), S Ryan 0–2 (0-1f), J Bridgeman 0–1	Report	C Dignam 0–10 (0-6f), P Quinn 1–1, J McGuirk 1–0, O O Maoileidigh 0–2, E Connolly, M Jarocki, D Quinn 0–1 each	Balgriffin; Referee: J Fagan (Erins Isle)

15 May 2010; Round 1	Naomh Mearnóg	3–7 – 3–9	Templeogue Synge Street	O'Toole Park; Referee: D Conway (Ballyboden St Endas)
15 May 2010; Round 1	S McHale 2–1 (2–0 pens), R O’Sullivan 1–0, J Madden (0-1f), D Barry 0–2 each, R O’Reilly, J Walsh 0–1 each.	Report	A O’Brien 0–7 (0-3f), D Bastick (1–0 pen) 1–1, C McKiernan, F O’Gara 1–0 each, E McKiernan 0–1.	O'Toole Park; Referee: D Conway (Ballyboden St Endas)

13 March 2010; Round 1	Erins Isle	0–6 – 2–13	St Judes	Druimnigh; Referee: G Carthy (Innisfails)
13 March 2010; Round 1	N Crossan (0-2f), L Sweetnam (0-1f, 0–1 45) 0–2 each, S Casey, G O’Connell 0–1 each		K McManamon 1–3 (0-3f), P Cunningham, J Donnelly (1f) 0–3 each, R Joyce 1–0, S Gallagher, R O’Brien 0–2 each	Druimnigh; Referee: G Carthy (Innisfails)

14 March 2010; Round 1	Parnells	1–10 – 3–12	Kilmacud Crokes	Parnell Park; Referee: K Higgins (Na Fianna)
14 March 2010; Round 1	MJ Tierney 0–9 (0-7f), K McGuckian 1–0, J Dignam 0–1	Report	M Vaughan 0–6 (0-2f), P Burke 1–3, D Magee, M Coughlan 1–0 each, R Cosgrove 0–2, B O’Rorke 0–1	Parnell Park; Referee: K Higgins (Na Fianna)

13 March 2010; Round 1	Round Towers, Clondalkin	2–8 – 2–16	St Sylvester's	Balgriffin; Referee: T Lambe (St Vincent’s)
13 March 2010; Round 1	J O’Brien 0–5 (0-4f), C Carr, L Connolly 1–0, D Murray, I Ward, M Hallows 0–1 each		A Relihan 1–4 (0-1f), D Clarke 0–7 (0-3f), E Fanning 1–1, E Bennis, C McIntyre, B Sexton, M McCarthy 0–1 each	Balgriffin; Referee: T Lambe (St Vincent’s)

14 March 2010; Round 1	Ballyboden St. Enda's	1–17 – 0–8	Trinity Gaels	Parnell Park; Referee: B O’Shea (St Mark’s)
14 March 2010; Round 1	D Davey 0–8 (0-3f), S Gibbons 1–1, D Nelson, A Kerin (0-2f) 0–3 each, M McCabe, M MacAuley 0–1 each	Report	E McInerney 0–4, G Dillon 0–2 (0-1f), D Kelly, M Forde 0–1 each	Parnell Park; Referee: B O’Shea (St Mark’s)

- Raheny received a bye to the next round.

== Backdoor Round ==
This round is the first knockout round between the losers of the first round of the 2010 Dublin Championship, the losers will enter the relegation round and the winners go on to qualify for the third round against the losers of the second round ties. Thomas Davis, Ballymun Kickham's, Fingallian's, Round Towers (C), Trinity Gaels and Fingal Ravens progressed to the third round of the competition. St. Mark's, Erin's Isle, Clontarf, Naomh Mearnóg, Parnell's and St. Patrick's, Palmerstown went on to contest the relegation championship, with the eventual losers playing in the Dublin Intermediate Football Championship in 2011.

25 August 2010; 18:45; Backdoor	Thomas Davis	0–14 – 0–10	St Patrick's (P)	O'Toole Park; Referee: Philip Fitzsimons (Liffey Gaels)
25 August 2010; 18:45; Backdoor	S McGrath 0–6, C Farrelly 0–5 (0-4f), Brian Kirby, P Boland, E Kirby 0–1 each. St Pat’s,	Report	J Kelly 0–6 (0-3f), G Kelly 0–2, P Faughnan (0-1f), C Driver 0–1 each.	O'Toole Park; Referee: Philip Fitzsimons (Liffey Gaels)

25 August 2010; 19:30; Backdoor	St Mark's	1–9 – 0–14	Fingal Ravens	Balgriffin; Referee: Timmy McCarthy
25 August 2010; 19:30; Backdoor	W Finnegan 0–5 (0-5f), N Tormey 0–3, A Casey, D Daly 0–2 each, J Morris, D Flanagan 0–1 each.	Report	B Kennedy 0–4 (0-2f), B Redmond 1–0, D O’Callaghan 0–2 (0-1f), S Tynan, J Kelly, G Tynan 0–1 each.	Balgriffin; Referee: Timmy McCarthy

27 August 2010; 18:45; Backdoor	St. Peregrine's	2–16 (AET) 0–22	Whitehall Colmcille's	Parnell Park; Referee: T Dennehy
27 August 2010; 18:45; Backdoor	C McGuinness 1–2 (0-2f), R McCarthy, E Jennings 0–4 each, S Lowndes 1–0, T Reilly, D McGovern 0–2 each, D McGovern, K O’Connor 0–1 each.	Report	S Walsh 0–7 (0-4f), S Ryan 0–5 (0-2f), L O’Donovan, B Mulligan 0–3 each, G O’Hagan 0–2, A Holly, O McCarthy 0–1 each.	Parnell Park; Referee: T Dennehy

27 August 2010; 20:15; Backdoor	Ballymun Kickham's	0–21 – 0–7	Erin's Isle	Parnell Park; Referee: Paul Faughnan
27 August 2010; 20:15; Backdoor	A Hubbard, E Christie (0-1f), D Rock 0–4 each, Derek Byrne 0–3 (0-1f), K Leahy 0–2, T Furman, K Connolly, E Reilly, J McCarthy 0–1 each.	Report	N Crossan 0–3 (0-1f), N Carty (0-1f), C Pike, C Flynn, K Nicholson 0–1 each.	Parnell Park; Referee: Paul Faughnan

28 August 2010; 16:30; Backdoor	Fingallian's	2–16 – 0–3	Clontarf	Naul; Referee: Dave Feeney (Whitehall Colmcilles).
28 August 2010; 16:30; Backdoor	D Farrell 2–1, D Killeen 0–5 (0-2f), C McLoughlin 0–3(0-2f), P Flynn 0–3, D Keane 0–2, P Murtagh, B Clarke 0–1 each.	Report	D Mullins 0–2 (0-1f), C Morrison 0–1.	Naul; Referee: Dave Feeney (Whitehall Colmcilles).

28 August 2010; 16:30; Backdoor	Round Tower's (C)	1–12 – 0–9	Naomh Mearnóg	O'Toole Park; Referee: Senan Finucane (Templeogue Synge Street).
28 August 2010; 16:30; Backdoor	M Hallows 1–2 (1–0 pen), C Carr 0–4 (0-2f), J O’Brien (0-1f), P Clifford 0–2, I Ward, B Keane 0–1 each.	Report	A Sheppard 0–6 (0-4f), M Gibbs 0–2, S McHale 0–1.	O'Toole Park; Referee: Senan Finucane (Templeogue Synge Street).

29 August 2010; 11:00; Backdoor	Trinity Gaels	0–13 – 0–12	Parnell's	Lawless Park; Referee: Kevin Roche(Whitehall Colmcille).
29 August 2010; 11:00; Backdoor	B O’Brien 0–7 (0-4f), E McInerney 0–3, J McCann, M Forde, R Sheridan 0–1 each.	Report	MJ Tierney 0–6 (0-1f), J Peyton 0–3 (1f), C Begley, N Collins, P Hogan 0–1 each.	Lawless Park; Referee: Kevin Roche(Whitehall Colmcille).

31 August 2010; 19:30; Backdoor	St. Peregrine's	0–12 – 0–7	Whitehall Colmcille's	Parnell Park; Referee: G McCormack (Naomh Barróg)
31 August 2010; 19:30; Backdoor	R McCarthy 0–8 (0-1f), C McGuinness 0–3, E Jennings 0–1.	Report	S Ryan 0–3 (0-1f), A Holly 0–2, S Walsh (0-f), L O’Donovan 0–1 each.	Parnell Park; Referee: G McCormack (Naomh Barróg)

== Second round ==
The winners of the second round went on to qualify for the fourth round of the Championship. The losers played in the third round against the winners of the backdoor round. St. Vincent's, Lucan Sarsfields, UCD, St. Oliver Plunkett's Eoghan Ruadh, Na Fianna, St. Brigid's, Kilmacud Crokes and 2009 champions Ballyboden St. Enda's went to the fourth round. Raheny, O'Toole's, Templeogue SS, St. Sylvester's, Ballinteer St. John's, St. Anne's, St. Maur's and last year's finalists St. Jude got a second chance to progress in the third round of the competition.

26 August 2010; 18:45; Second Round	St. Vincent's	2–15 – 0–8	St. Jude's	Parnell Park; Referee: J Rutherford (Ballyboden St Enda’s).
26 August 2010; 18:45; Second Round	C Dorney 2–2, T Quinn 0–7 (0-3f, 0–1 ‘45’), R Trainor 0–4, H Gill, P Lee 0–1 each.	Report	K McManamon 0–4 (0-4f), B McManamon 0–2 (0-1f), P Harlow, D Donnelly (f) 0–1 each.	Parnell Park; Referee: J Rutherford (Ballyboden St Enda’s).

26 August 2010; 18:45; Second Round	Raheny	0–9 – 1–15	Lucan Sarsfields	Parnell Park; Referee: B O’Shea (St Mark’s).
26 August 2010; 18:45; Second Round	D Henry 0–6 (0-5f), E Keogh 0–2, E Delaney 0–1.	Report	J Doyle 0–7 (0-3f), C O’Neill 1–2, T Brennan 0–4 (0-1f), J O’Neill, B Gallagher 0–1 each.	Parnell Park; Referee: B O’Shea (St Mark’s).

26 August 2010; 19:30; Second Round	Ballyboden St. Enda's	0–12 – 1–5	O'Toole's	St. Margaret's; Referee: Andrew McAllister (Starlights).
26 August 2010; 19:30; Second Round	D Davey (0-1f), C Keaney (0-4f) 0–4 each, S Lambert 0–3, C Smith 0–1.	Report	C Farrelly 1–2, D Mooney 0–3.	St. Margaret's; Referee: Andrew McAllister (Starlights).

26 August 2010; 19:30; Second Round	UCD	0–10 – 1–5	Templeogue SS	Kiltipper Road; Referee: Keith Tighe (St Anne’s).
26 August 2010; 19:30; Second Round	C Kelly 0–5 (0-4f), T Warburton 0–2, J Heslin (0-1f), L Smith, P Brady 0–1 each.	Report	D Treanor 1–2 (0-1f), D Bastick 0–2 (1 ‘45’), E O’Gara 0–1.	Kiltipper Road; Referee: Keith Tighe (St Anne’s).

26 August 2010; 20:15; Second Round	St. Sylvester's	3–5 – 1–12	St. Oliver Plunkett's	Parnell Park; Referee: Gary Owen McMahon
26 August 2010; 20:15; Second Round	D Clarke 1–3 (0-1f), A Relihan 1–1 (1–0 pen, 1f), R Cleere 1–0, J Sullivan 0–1 (0-1f).	Report	G Smith 1–7 (1–0 pen, 1f), A Brogan 0–2, B Brogan (0-1f), D Sweeney, A Moyles 0–1 each.	Parnell Park; Referee: Gary Owen McMahon

28 August 2010; 18:00; Second Round	Ballinteer St. John's	0–9 – 0–14	Na Fianna	O'Toole Park; Referee: Tony Lambe (St Vincent’s).
28 August 2010; 18:00; Second Round	P O’Connor 0–3, F Duffy 0–2 (0-1f), P O’Curry, C Gormley, J McNally (‘45’), S O’Connor 0–1 each.	Report	S Connell 0–4 (0-1f), P Quinn 0–3, T Brady, C O’Connor 0–2, C Duignan, B Downes, D Quinn 0–1 each.	O'Toole Park; Referee: Tony Lambe (St Vincent’s).

28 August 2010; 18:00; Second Round	St. Anne's	0–5 – 0–17	St. Brigid's	Newcastle; Referee: Brendan Carroll (Ballyboden St Enda’s).
28 August 2010; 18:00; Second Round	P Andrews 0–5, K Darcy 0–3 (0-3f), Mark Cahill (0-1f), K Bonner, B Cahill 0–2 each, G Kane, A Daly, C Moran 0–1 each.	Report	T Dunne 0–3 (0-2f), D Watson, J Kelly 0–1 each.	Newcastle; Referee: Brendan Carroll (Ballyboden St Enda’s).

28 August 2010; 18:00; Second Round	St. Maur's	0–6 – 2–11	Kilmacud Croke's	Parnell Park; Referee: Dermot Deasy
28 August 2010; 18:00; Second Round	C Carthy 0–3 (0-2f), M McGrath 0–2, J Sweetman 0–1.	Report	P Burke 2–2, B O’Rorke 0–4 (0-1f), B Kavanagh 0–3, R Cosgrove 0–2 (0-1f).	Parnell Park; Referee: Dermot Deasy

== Third round ==
In the third round, the backdoor winners are paired against the losers of the second round. The winners of the third round qualify for the fourth round against the second round winners. Thomas Davis, St Annes, Raheny, Trinity Gaels, St. Maur's, Ballinteer St Johns, Templeogue SS and Round Towers, Clondalkin were eliminated from the championship during this round, their next game will be in the 2011 Dublin championship. St Judes, St Peregrines, Ballymun Kickhams, O'Tooles, Fingallians, Round Towers Clondalkin, Fingal Ravens and St Marys, Saggart have qualified for the fourth round of the 2010 Dublin Championship.

7 September 2010; Third Round	O'Tooles	1–13 – 0–5	Trinity Gaels	Balgriffin; Referee: G McCormack (Nh Barróg).
7 September 2010; Third Round	M Healy 1–4 (1–0 pen, 0-4f), P Carton 0–3 (0-1f), A Morris 0–2, J Bastow, D Mooney, D Hanly 0–1 each.	Report	B O’Brien 0–3 (0-1f), M Forde, J McCann 0–1 each.	Balgriffin; Referee: G McCormack (Nh Barróg).

8 September 2010; Third Round	Templeogue SS	0–8 – 0–17	Ballymun Kickhams	Parnell Park; Referee: B O’Shea (St Mark’s).
8 September 2010; Third Round	D Treanor (1f), F O’Gara 0–3 each, C O’Reilly, A O’Brien(f) 0–1 each.	Report	D Rock 0–6 (0-3f), K Leahy 0–5 (0-1f), Derek Byrne 0–2, T Furman, E Christie, A Hubbard, B McCullagh 0–1 each.	Parnell Park; Referee: B O’Shea (St Mark’s).

{{{date}}}	St Judes	2–13 – 1–11	Thomas Davis	Iveagh Grounds; Referee: T Lambe (St Vincent’s).
{{{date}}}	D Donnelly 1–2, R O’Brien 1–1, K McManamon (0-2f), B McManamon 0–3, S Gallagher 0–2, R Joyce, P Harlow 0–1 each.	Report	C Farrelly 0–5 (0-2f, 0–1 ‘45’), S Ellis 1–0, S Reilly, E Kirby, S McGrath 0–2 each.	Iveagh Grounds; Referee: T Lambe (St Vincent’s).

7 September 2010; Third Round	Ballinteer St Johns	0–10 – 1–12	St Marys, Saggart	Referee: K Tighe (St Anne’s).
7 September 2010; Third Round	F Duffy 0–5 (0-2f), S McCann, C O’Donnell (0–1 ‘45’) 0–2 each, M Kavanagh 0–1.	Report	D McCormack 1–2, B Kelly 0–4 (0-1f), E Murray 0–3 (0-3f), D Marshall 0–2 (0–1‘45’), D Carrigan 0–1.	Referee: K Tighe (St Anne’s).

8 September 2010; Third Round	St Annes	0–12 – 1–10	St Peregrines	Referee: P Fitzsimmons (Liffey Gaels).
8 September 2010; Third Round	J Kelly 0–5 (0-5f), C L’Estrange 0–3 (0-3f), D Watson 0–2, T Connolly, T Dunne 0–1 each.	Report	S Lowndes 1–3 (0–1 ‘45’), R McCarthy 0–3 (0-2f), C Lowndes 0–2, D Rooney, E Jennings (0-1f) 0–1 each.	Referee: P Fitzsimmons (Liffey Gaels).

7 September 2010; Third Round	St Sylvesters	0–15 – 2–4	Fingallians	Parnell Park; Referee: D Deasy (Ballymun Kickhams).
7 September 2010; Third Round	D Clarke, A Relihan (0-2f) 0–5, G Sweeney 0–3, M McCarthy, N Coughlan 0–1 each.	Report	D Killeen (0-1f), D Keane 1–1 each, G Lewis, C McLoughlin (0-1f) 0–1 each.	Parnell Park; Referee: D Deasy (Ballymun Kickhams).

7 September 2010; Third Round	Raheny	1–17 – 0–11	Round Towers, Clondalkin	Russell Park; Referee: T Dennehy (Naomh Mearnóg).
7 September 2010; Third Round	D Henry 0–6 (0-2f, 0–1 sline), J Ryan 0–3, T Ó Doinn 1–0, M O’Keeffe 0–2, Seán Swords, N Sullivan, G Bennett, S Dempsey, E Keogh, E Delaney 0–1 each.	Report	J O’Brien 0–5 (0-3f), D Macken, C Carr (0-1f) 0–2 each, I Ward, P Clifford 0–1 each.	Russell Park; Referee: T Dennehy (Naomh Mearnóg).

7 September 2010; Third Round	St Maurs	0–10 – 0–12	Fingal Ravens	Garristown; Referee: A McAllister (Starlights).
7 September 2010; Third Round	C Carthy 0–10 (0-6f).	Report	W Finnegan 0–7 (0-4f), N Tormey 0–4, C Norton 0–1.	Garristown; Referee: A McAllister (Starlights).

== Fourth round ==
The winners of the fourth round progress to the quarter-finals of the Dublin Championship. The losers are eliminated from the competition. St Judes, O'Tooles, St Sylvesters, Ballymun Kickhams, St Peregrines, Raheny, Fingal Ravens and St Marys, Saggart were eliminated from the competition at the fourth round stage. St Brigids, Na Fianna, Kilmacud Crokes, St Vincents, UCD, Ballyboden St Endas, Lucan Sarsfields and St Oliver Plunketts Eoghan Ruadh all qualified for the semi-final of the championship.

12 September 2010; Fourth round	St. Brigid's	2–10 – 1–10	St Judes	O'Toole Park; Referee: B Carroll (Fingal Ravens).
12 September 2010; Fourth round	Paddy Andrews 1–1, K Darcy 0–4 (0-3f), D Lally 1–0, K Bonner, Mark Cahill (0-1f) 0–2, S Supple 0–1 (‘45’).	Report	K McManamon 0–5 (0-4f), R O’Brien 1–1 (1–0 pen), D Donnelly 0–2 (0-2f), J Donnelly (0-1f), P Harlow 0–1 each.	O'Toole Park; Referee: B Carroll (Fingal Ravens).

11 September 2010; Fourth round	Na Fianna	0–12 – 0–8	O'Tooles	Parnell Park; Referee: A McAllister (Starlights).
11 September 2010; Fourth round	S Connell 0–6 (0-5f), P Quinn 0–2, J Cooper, C Duignan, D Quinn, B Downes 0–1 each.	Report	Peadar Carton 0–4 (0-3f), C Farrelly 0–2, M Cunningham, D Mooney 0–1 each.	Parnell Park; Referee: A McAllister (Starlights).

11 September 2010; Fourth round	Kilmacud Crokes	0–14 – 1–8	St Sylvesters	Parnell Park; Referee: P Faughnan (St Pat’s, Palmerstown).
11 September 2010; Fourth round	B Kavanagh 0–5 (0-1f), R Cosgrove (0-2f), P Burke 0–3 each, L Og O hEineachain, D Kelleher, A Morrissey 0–1 each.	Report	E Bennis 1–1 (1–0 pen), A Relihan 0–3 (0-2f), G Sweeney 0–2, R Hazley, D Clarke 0–1 each.	Parnell Park; Referee: P Faughnan (St Pat’s, Palmerstown).

12 September 2010; Fourth round	St Vincents	2–15 0–5	St Marys, Saggart	O'Toole Park; Referee: John Fagan (Erin's Isle).
12 September 2010; Fourth round	T Quinn 0–8 (6f, 1 '45'), D Connolly 1–3 (0-1f), A O'Malley 1–1, R Trainor 0–2, A Baxter 0–1.	Report	Blaine Kelly 0–2, D Corcoran, D Marshall (f), K O'Sullivan (f) 0–1 each.	O'Toole Park; Referee: John Fagan (Erin's Isle).

12 September 2010; Fourth round	St Oliver Plunketts Eoghan Ruadh	0–11 – 0–8	Ballymun Kickhams	Fingallians; Referee: J Murray (Castleknock).
12 September 2010; Fourth round	B Brogan 0–5 (0-5f), J Sherlock 0–3, G Smith 0–2 (0-2f), A Brogan 0–1.	Report	Derek Byrne, D Rock (0-3f) 0–3 each, E Christie, David Byrne 0–1 each.	Fingallians; Referee: J Murray (Castleknock).

12 September 2010; Fourth round	UCD	2–13 – 0–6	St Peregrines	O’Toole Park; Referee: M Bissett (Whitehall Colmcilles).
12 September 2010; Fourth round	C Kelly 2–3 (0-1f), J Heslin 0–6 (0-1f), D Kingston 0–2 (0-1f), S Redmond, J O’Loughlin 0–1 each.	Report	R McCarthy (0-1f), C McGuinness (0-1f) 0–2 each, D McGovern, K O’Connor 0–1 each.	O’Toole Park; Referee: M Bissett (Whitehall Colmcilles).

{{{date}}}	Ballyboden St Endas	1–16 – 0–7	Raheny	O'Toole Park; Referee: Senan Finucane (Templeogue Synge Street).
{{{date}}}	A Kerins 1–5 (1–0 pen, 0-1f), C Keaney 0–4 (4f), K Naughton 0–3, MD Macauley, S Lambert, D Ryan, P Galvin 0–1 each.	Report	D Henry 0–5 (5f), J Ryan, G Bennett 0–1 each.	O'Toole Park; Referee: Senan Finucane (Templeogue Synge Street).

12 September 2010; Fourth round	Lucan Sarsfields	1–13 – 1–6	Fingal Ravens	Balgriffin; Referee: K Higgins (Na Fianna).
12 September 2010; Fourth round	T Brennan 0–5 (1f), J Doyle 0–4 (3f), P Casey 1–0, D O’Shaughnessy, S O’Shaughnessy, B Gallagher, B Collopy 0–1 each.	Report	N Tormey 1–2, J Morris, D Kavannagh, K Kavannagh, W Finnegan (f) 0–1 each.	Balgriffin; Referee: K Higgins (Na Fianna).

== Quarter finals ==
St Brigids, Kilmacud Crokes, St Vincents and St Oliver Plunketts Eoghan Ruadh progressed to the semi-finals of the Dublin Championship. The UCD, Lucan Sarsfields, Na Fianna and lastyear's champions Ballyboden St Endas were eliminated from the competition.

25 September 2010; 18:00; Quarter-final	St Vincents	0–15 – 0–15	Ballyboden St Endas	Parnell Park; Referee: T Dennehy (Nh Mearnog).
25 September 2010; 18:00; Quarter-final	T Quinn 0–6 (0-1f), D Connolly, C Dorney 0–3 each, A O’Malley 0–2, R Trainor 0–1.	Report	M McCabe 0–4, A Kerin 0–3 (0-2f), S Lambert, P Galvin 0–2 each, D O’Mahoney (0-1f), C Smyth (0–1 ‘45’), MD Macauley, P O’Connell 0–1 each.	Parnell Park; Referee: T Dennehy (Nh Mearnog).

25 September 2010; 17:30; Quarter-final	St Oliver Plunketts Eoghan Ruadh	4–11 – 0–7	Lucan Sarsfields	O'Toole Park; Referee: Brian O'Shea
25 September 2010; 17:30; Quarter-final	B Brogan 2–0, G Smith 1–3 (0-3f), J Sherlock 0–3, D Sweeney 1–0, A Darcy, A Brogan 0–2 each, R McConnell 0–1 (0–1 ‘45’).	Report	T Brennan 0–3, B Gallagher 0–2, J Doyle (0-1f), S Shaughnessy 0–1 each.	O'Toole Park; Referee: Brian O'Shea

26 September 2010; 12:00; Quarter-final	Na Fianna	1–10 – 0–15	Kilmacud Crokes	Parnell Park; Referee: G McCormack (Nh Barróg).
26 September 2010; 12:00; Quarter-final	O O Maoileidigh 1–2, S Connell (0-1f), P Quinn (0-1f), T Brady 0–2 each, C Duignan, K Gormley 0–1 each.	Report	B Kavanagh 0–8 (0-7f), A Morrissey 0–3 (0–1 ‘45’), L Og O hEineacahain, D Kelleher, R Cosgrove, P Burke 0–1 each.	Parnell Park; Referee: G McCormack (Nh Barróg).

24 September 2010; 20:15; Quarter-final	UCD	0–8 – 0–9	St Brigids	Parnell Park; Referee: Keith Tighe (St Annes)
24 September 2010; 20:15; Quarter-final	J O’Loughlin 0–3, J Heslin 0–2 (0-2f), K McGourty, C Kelly (0-1f), D O Laorcain 0–1 each.	Report	K Bonner 0–3, Mark Cahill (0-1f), K Darcy (0-2f) 0–2 each, P Ryan, Paddy Andrews 0–1 each.	Parnell Park; Referee: Keith Tighe (St Annes)

6 October 2010; 19:45; Quarter-final Replay	St Vincents	2–9 – 0–13	Ballyboden St Endas	Parnell Park; Referee: B Feeney (Parnell’s).
6 October 2010; 19:45; Quarter-final Replay	T Quinn (0-3f) 1–3, D Connolly 0–3 (0-1f), T Diamond 1–0, H Gill, A O’Malley, R Trainor 0–1 each.	Report	C Keaney 0–8 (0-3f, 0–1 sline), A Kerin 0–2 (0-2f), MD Macauley, D O’Mahoney, M McCabe 0–1 each.	Parnell Park; Referee: B Feeney (Parnell’s).

== Semi finals ==
St Oliver Plunketts Eoghan Ruadh, Kilmacud Crokes, St Brigids and St Vincents are the teams participating in the last four of the Dublin championship.

9 October 2010; 18:00; Semi-final	St Oliver Plunketts Eoghan Ruadh	0–5 – 1–9	St Brigids	Parnell Park; Referee: Gary McCormack (Nh Barrog).
9 October 2010; 18:00; Semi-final	K Darcy 1–2 (0-2f), Paddy Andrews 0–4 (0-1f), Mark Cahill 0–2 (0-2f), C Mullins 0–1.	Report	B Brogan, G Smith (0-2f) 0–2 each, A Brogan 0–1.	Parnell Park; Referee: Gary McCormack (Nh Barrog).

10 October 2010; 16:00; Semi-final	Kilmacud Crokes	1–10 – 1–9	St Vincents	Parnell Park; Referee: Brian O Shea
10 October 2010; 16:00; Semi-final	B Kavanagh 1–4 (1–0 pen, 0-2f), B O’Rorke 0–4 (0-1f), D Kelleher 0–2.	Report	T Quinn 0–5 (0-4f, 0–1 sline), D Connolly 1–2, A O’Malley, R Trainor 0–1 each.	Parnell Park; Referee: Brian O Shea

== Dublin Senior Football Final ==
Kilmacud Crokes	2–12 – 0–11 (final score after 60 minutes)	St Brigid's
Manager: Team: D. Nestor; C. Lamb; Rory O'Carroll; Ross O'Carroll; B. McGrath; C. O’Sullivan; R. Ryan; N. Corkery; P. Duggan; A. Morrissey; D. Kelleher; L. Ó hEineachain; B. O’Rorke; B. Kavanagh; P. Burke Substitutes: M. Vaughan for O’Rorke (37); C. Dias for Morrissey (50); L. McBarron for Duggan (58); N. McGrath for Corkery (62).	Half-time: Competition: Dublin Senior Football Championship (Final) Date: 16.00 BST Venue: Parnell Park, Dublin Attendance: Referee: K Tighe (St Anne’s). Match rules: 60 minutes. Replay if scores still level. Maximum of 5 substitutions.	Manager: Team: S. Supple; A. Daly; Peadar Andrews; G. Norton; G. Kane; S. Murray; D. Lally; C. Mullins; B. Cahill; K.0 Milmurray; K. Bonner; Mark Cahill; Paddy Andrews; K. Darcy; P. Ryan Substitutes: D Plunkett for K Kilmurray (40); C. Kilmurray for Lally (45); C Freeman for Murray (57); N Davey for Bonner (61).

== Relegation ==
These games are the opposite of a knock out competition, with the winners of each game leaving the competition as they win. Naomh Mearnóg, Erins Isle and St Marks are safe from relegation for 2010. In the end, all relegation games were obsolete, as the Intermediate championship winners St Brigids already had a Senior team.

22 September 2010; Relegation	Clontarf	0–8 – 1–9	Naomh Mearnóg	Iveagh Grounds
22 September 2010; Relegation		Report		Iveagh Grounds

22 September 2010; Relegation	St Marks	1–16 -1-11	Whitehall Colmcille
22 September 2010; Relegation		Report

5 October 2010; Relegation	Erins Isle	2–8 – 2–5	Parnells	St Margarets; Referee: Finbarr Shanahan

{{{date}}}	Clontarf	1–9 – 2–4	Whitehall Colmcille

{{{date}}}	Parnells	v	St Pats, Palmerstown
