= 2008–09 All-Ireland Senior Club Football Championship =

- Dates: 19 October 2008 – 17 March 2009
- Teams: 30
- Sponsor: Allied Irish Bank
- Champions: Kilmacud Crokes (2nd title); Johnny Magee (captain); Paddy Carr (manager)
- Runners-up: Crossmaglen Rangers; John Donaldson (captain); Donal Murtagh (manager)

Tournament statistics
- Matches played: 33
- Top scorer(s): Mark Vaughan (2–32)

The 2008–09 All-Ireland Senior Club Football Championship was the 39th staging of the All-Ireland Senior Club Football Championship since its establishment by the Gaelic Athletic Association in 1970–71. The competition began on 19 October 2008 and concluded on 17 March 2009.

The defending champion was St Vincent's; however, the club lost to Kilmacud Crokes in the 2008 Dublin SFC semi-final replay. No representative clubs from Waterford or Wexford participated because of delays in the SFCs of those counties being completed.

Kilmacud Crokes defeated Crossmaglen Rangers by 1–9 to 0–7 in the final at Croke Park on 17 March 2009 to win the competition. It was the club's second title, and a first since 1995.

Mark Vaughan of Kilmacud was the competition's top scorer, finishing with 2–32.

== Connacht ==
=== Quarter-final ===
19 October 2008 Quarter-final	Eastern Harps	1-15 - 1-05	Glencar–Manorhamilton	Markievicz Park
	P Taylor 1-6 (1f), D O'Grady 0-4, T Taylor 0-2, J Rafferty, T Cryan, R Hannon (1f) 0-1 each.	Report	P Gilmartin 1-0, D Kelly 0-2 (1sl), G Hickey (1f), J Glancy (1f), A Sweeney 0-1each.

=== Semi-finals ===
9 November 2008 Semi-final	Castlerea St Kevin's	0-08 - 1-14	Corofin	Kiltoom
	G Heneghan 0-4 (4f), J Duggan 0-2, R Curran, E Kenny 0-1 each.	Report	A O'Donovan 1-3 (0-1f), D Hanley 0-4, J Canney 0-3, G Sice, A Burke, G Higgins, T Burke all 0-1 each.

9 November 2008 Semi-final	Eastern Harps	0-12 - 0-09	Ballaghadereen	Markievicz Park
	P Taylor 0-8 (0-6f), D O'Grady 0-2, T Cryan, J Rafferty 0-1 each.	Report	B Regan 0-4 (0-3f), A Hanley 0-2, Gary Conway, M Solan, B Kelly 0-1 each.

=== Final ===
23 November 2008 Final	Corofin	0-11 - 0-06	Eastern Harps	Pearse Stadium
	A O'Donovan (0-3, one free), J Killeen (0-2), J Canney (0-2), G Sice (0-2, one free), A Donnellan (0-1), A Burke (0-1).		P Taylor (0-2, frees), T Cryan (0-1, 50); R Hannon (0-1 free), K Cryan (0-1), K Carty (0-1).

== Leinster ==
=== First round ===
2 November 2008 First round	Navan O'Mahonys	w/o - scr.	Kilanerin–Ballyfad

2 November 2008 First round	Kilmacud Crokes	0-13 - 0-08	Celbridge	Parnell Park
	M Vaughan 0-5, B Kavanagh 0-2, B O'Rourke 0-2, P Burke 0-2, M Davoren 0-2.		S Harte 0-3, H McGrillen 0-2, C McEvoy 0-1, M O'Sullivan 0-1, B Moyles 0-1.

2 November 2008 First round	Éire Óg	3-10 - 1-12	Kiltegan	Dr Cullen Park
	M Kelly 2-1, E McCormack 1-1, S Rea 0-3, W Quinlan 0-2, B Carbery 0-2, T Dowling 0-1.		R Finn 1-0, D Daly 0-3, A Foley 0-3, A Furlong 0-2, S Furlong 0-2, J Doyle 0-1, J Keogh 0-1.

=== Quarter-finals ===
9 November 2008 Quarter-final	Kilmacud Crokes	1-13 - 1-09	Newtown Blues	Parnell Park
	M Vaughan 1-8, B Kavanagh 0-4, R Cosgrove 0-1.		H McGinn 0-6, B Kermode 1-0, C Judge 0-3.

9 November 2008 Quarter-final	Navan O'Mahonys	1-17 - 0-04	Castledaly	Pairc Tailteann
	D Bray 0-5 (2f); H Finnegan 0-4 (1f), K Reilly 1-0; M Ward, S Keating, S Bray 0-2 each; S McKeigue, C McGuinness 0-1 each.	Report	MJ McLoughlin 0-2 (2f); M Duffy O-1 (f), B Kelly 0-1.

9 November 2008 Quarter-final	Éire Óg	2-04 - 0-10 (aet)	Colmcille	Dr Cullen Park
	E McCormack 1-2, (2f), M Kelly 1-0, B Carbery, C Mullins 0-1 each.	Report	N Farrell 0-3 (1f), T Doyle 0-2 (2f), E Farrell, B Brady, JP Reilly, D Farrell, P McKeown (1f) 0-1 each.

9 November 2008 Quarter-final	Rhode	2-09 - 1-10	Portlaoise	O'Connor Park
	N Darby 1-2 (2f), P Kelleghan 1-0, N McNamee 0-3 (1f), R Malone, E Byrne, P Sullivan and A Sullivan 0-1 each.	Report	B McCormack 0-4 (2f), Z Tuohy 0-3 (1f, 1'45'), C Rogers 1-0, B Fitzgerald (f), C Parkinson, B Mulligan 0-1 each.

16 November 2008 Quarter-final replay	Colmcille	0-08 - 0-09 (aet)	Éire Óg	Pearse Park
	Declan C Reilly 0-3 (3f), B Brady, T Doyle, B McCabe, A Gormley, N Farrell (f), 0-1 each.	Report	E McCormack 0-6 (5 f), C Mullins 0-2, B Hennessy 0-1.

=== Semi-finals ===
23 November 2008 Semi-final	Kilmacud Crokes	1-11 - 0-07	Navan O'Mahonys	Parnell Park
	M Vaughan 0-6, four frees; M Davoren 1-0; B Kavanagh 0-2; P Burke 0-2; B McGrath 0-1.	Report	D Bray 0-2, one free; S Bray 0-2; S Keating 0-1 free; G O"Brien 0-1; P Smyth 0-1.

23 November 2008 Semi-final	Éire Óg	0-04 - 3-09	Rhode	Dr Cullen Park
	A Curran, J Ryan, E McCormack (1f), B Carbery 0-1 each.	Report	N McNamee 1-7 (3f), A Sullivan 2-0, N Darby 0-2 (1f).

=== Final ===
7 December 2008 Final	Kilmacud Crokes	2-07 - 1-07	Rhode	Parnell Park
	B Kavanagh (1-1), M Davoren (1-0), M Vaughan (0-3, two frees), L Óg Ó hÉinneacháin (0-1), P Griffin (0-1), R Cosgrove (0-1).	Report	N McNamee (1-3), P Sullivan (0-1), P Sullivan (0-1), A McNamee (0-1); N Darby (0-1, free).

== Munster ==
=== Quarter-finals ===
9 November 2008 Quarter-final	Nemo Rangers	2-12 - 0-12	Kerins O'Rahilly's	Páirc Uí Chaoimh
	P Kerrigan 2-5 (0-2f), J Masters 0-4 (2f), D Niblock, D Kearney, D Mehigan 0-1 each.	Report	D Quill 0-5 (3f), D Moran 0-3 (1f, 1 '45), T Walsh 0-2, J O'Connor, B J Keane 0-1 each.

9 November 2008 Quarter-final	Kilmurry-Ibrickane	w/o - scr.	The Nire

=== Semi-finals ===
23 November 2008 Semi-final	Kilmurry-Ibrickane	2-06 - 0-04	Galtee Rovers	Quilty
	N Downes (1-0), P O'Connor (1-0); E Coughlan (0-2, one 45); J Daly (0-1, free), S Moloney (0-1); M O'Dwyer (0-1, free), O O'Dwyer (0-1, free).		Denis Peters (0-1, free), T Egan (0-1, free), Declan Peters (0-1), M O'Brien (0-1).

23 November 2008 Semi-final	Dromcollogher/Broadford	0-07 - 0-06	Nemo Rangers	Gaelic Grounds
	S Buckley 0-3, M Reidy 0-2f, D McCarthy, G Noonan 0-1.	Report	B O'Driscoll P Kerrigan (1f) 0-2 each, S O'Brien, J Masters 0-1 each.

=== Final ===
7 December 2008 Final	Dromcollogher/Broadford	0-06 - 0-05	Kilmurry-Ibrickane	Gaelic Grounds
	M Reidy (0-2f), P Donnelly (0-2f) 0-2 each; D McCarthy and S Buckley 0-1 each.	Report	M O'Dwyer (0-2f), O O'Dwyer (0-1f) 0-2 each; D Callinan 0-1.

== Ulster ==
=== Preliminary round ===
19 October 2008 Preliminary round	Mayobridge	2-05 - 0-12	St Gall's	Pairc Esler
	B Coulter, R Sexton 1-1 each, N Sexton 0-3 (2f).	Report	CJ McGourty 0-4 (1f), K Niblock, K Stewart 0-2 each, S Kelly, A Healy, T O'Neill, K McGourty 0-1 each.

=== Quarter-final ===
2 November 2008 Quarter-final	Clonoe O'Rahilly's	1-08 - 2-10	St Eunan's	Fr. Peter Campbell Park
	RR O'Neill 1-1, RT O'Neill 0-3, S McNulty 0-2, C Dorris 0-1, D Burke 0-1.		K Sharkey 1-1, B Devenney 0-4, D McGinley 1-0, R Wherity 0-2, R Kavanagh 0-1, C Dunne 0-1, K Rafferty 0-1.

2 November 2008 Quarter-final	St Gall's	0-07 - 1-07	Cavan Gaels	Casement Park
	CJ McGourty 0-3, S O'Neill 0-1, Kevin McGourty 0-1, S Kelly 0-1, K Stewart 0-1.		S Johnston 0-5, M Lyng 1-0, N Murray 0-1, E Reilly 0-1.

2 November 2008 Quarter-final	Ballinderry	1-11 - 0-10	Latton O'Rahilly's	Dean McGlinchey Park
	C Gilligan 0-6, R Wilkinson 1-2, E Muldoon 0-2, K (Moss) McGuckin 0-1.		B O'Brien 0-3, H McElroy 0-2, H Lennon 0-1, A Farmer 0-1, E Duffy 0-1, N Coyle 0-1, M O'Brien 0-1.

9 November 2008 Quarter-final	Crossmaglen Rangers	0-13 - 0-06	St Patrick's	Oliver Plunkett Park
	O McConville 0-3, A Kernan 0-3, D McKenna 0-2, M Ahern 0-2, T Kernan 0-2, K Carragher 0-1.		E Maguire 0-3, G Maguire 0-1, S McDermott 0-1, P Cadden 0-1.

=== Semi-finals ===
16 November 2008 Semi-final	Cavan Gaels	0-07 - 0-17	Ballinderry	Athletic Grounds
	M Lyng 0-2, R Moloney-Derham 0-1, E King 0-1, S Johnson 0-1, N Murray 0-1, C McClarey 0-1.		C Devlin 0-5, R Wilkinson 0-4, E Muldoon 0-2, M Harney 0-2, D Conway 0-1, C Gilligan 0-1, M Bell 0-1, J Bateson 0-1.

16 November 2008 Semi-final	Crossmaglen Rangers	0-11 - 0-08	St Eunan's	Brewster Park
	O McConville 0-6, J McEntee 0-2, T Kernan 0-1, A Kernan 0-1, J Murtagh 0-1.		R Wherrity 0-3, C Dunne 0-3, R Kavanagh 0-1, P McGowan 0-1.

=== Final ===
7 December 2008 Final	Crossmaglen Rangers	1-10 - 1-10 (aet)	Ballinderry	Brewster Park
	O McConville (1-2, 0-2 frees), M McNamee (0-2), A Kernan (0-2, both frees), S Kernan (0-1); T Kernan (0-1), D McKenna (0-1); J Murtagh (0-1).	Report	C Devlin (0-6, 0-3 frees); N McCusker (1-0), D Conway (0-1), J Conway (0-1), E Muldoon (0-1), C Gilligan (0-1).

14 December 2008 Final replay	Crossmaglen Rangers	0-12 - 1-04	Ballinderry	Brewster Park
	O McConville 0-6 (3f, 1 pen), M McNamee 0-2, J Clarke, P McKeown, J Murtagh, K Carragher 0-1 each.	Report	J Bateson 1-0, C Gilligan 0-2 (1f), J Conway, M Harney 0-1 each.

== Quarter-final ==
18 January 2009 Quarter-final	Tír Chonaill Gaels	0-06 - 2-07	Corofin	Emerald GAA Grounds
	K Downes 0-5 (0-4f); C McHugh 0-1.	Report	A O'Donovan 0-5 (0-5f); G Higgins, A Donnellan 1-0 each; A Burke, K Comer 0-1 each.

== Semi-finals ==
21 February 2009 Semi-final	Kilmacud Crokes	2-11 - 0-11	Corofin	Cusack Park
	M Vaughan 1-6 (0-4f), P Burke 1-2, M Davoren 0-2, B Kavanagh 0-1.	Report	A O'Donovan 0-4 (0-3f), S Monaghan, J Canney 0-2, G Sice, D Hanley, P Hanley (f) 0-1 each.

21 February 2009 Semi-final	Crossmaglen Rangers	4-12 - 0-06	Dromcollogher/Broadford	Pearse Park
	T Kernan 2-0, J Clarke 1-2, J Murtagh 1-1, O McConville 0-4 (2f), S Kernan 0-2, A Kernan 0-2 (1f), K Carragher 0-1.	Report	R Lynch, M Reidy 0-2 (f) each, P Donnelly (f), D McCarthy 0-1 each.

== Final ==
17 March 2009 Final	Kilmacud Crokes	1-09 – 0–07	Crossmaglen Rangers	Croke Park
	M Vaughan 0-4, M Davoren 1-0, B Kavanagh 0-2, D Magee, N Corkery, R Cosgrove 0-1 each.	Report	O McConville 0-4, T Kernan 0-2, S Kernan 0-1	Referee: G Kinneavy (Galway)

== Finalists ==
Kilmacud Crokes – 2009 All-Ireland Senior Club Football Champions (2nd title)

Paddy Carr managed the winning team.

1. David Nestor
2. Ross O'Carroll
3. Rory O'Carroll
4. Kevin Nolan
5. Brian McGrath
6. Paul Griffin
7. Cian O'Sullivan
8. Darren Magee
9. Niall Corkery
10. Liam Óg Ó hÉineacháin
11. Brian Kavanagh
12. Adrian Morrissey
13. Mark Vaughan
14. Mark Davoren
15. Pat Burke

Subs used

18 Johnny Magee (c) for Ó hÉineacháin
17 Ray Cosgrove for Kavanagh

== Statistics ==
=== Top scorers ===
Overall

Rank	Player	Club	Tally	Total	Matches	Average
1	Mark Vaughan	Kilmacud Crokes	2-32	38	6	6.33
2	Oisín McConville	Crossmaglen Rangers	1-25	28	6	4.66
3	Niall McNamee	Rhode	2-13	19	3	6.33
3	Paul Taylor	Eastern Harps	1-16	19	3	6.33
4	Alan O'Donovan	Corofin	1-15	18	4	4.50
5	Eric McCormack	Éire Óg	2-10	16	4	4.00
6	Brian Kavanagh	Kilmacud Crokes	1-12	15	6	2.50
7	Mark Davoren	Kilmacud Crokes	3-04	13	6	2.16
7	Paul Kerrigan	Nemo Rangers	2-07	13	2	6.50
8	Tony McKernan	Crossmaglen Rangers	2-06	12	6	2.00

In a single game

Rank	Player	Club	Tally	Total	Opposition
1	Paul Kerrigan	Nemo Rangers	2-05	11	Kerins O'Rahilly's
1	Mark Vaughan	Kilmacud Crokes	1-08	11	Newtown Blues
2	Niall McNamee	Rhode	1-07	10	Éire Óg
3	Paul Taylor	Eastern Harps	1-06	9	Glencar-Manorhamilton
3	Mark Vaughan	Kilmacud Crokes	1-06	9	Corofin
4	Paul Taylor	Eastern Harps	0-08	8	Ballaghadereen
5	Mark Kelly	Éire Óg	2-01	7	Kiltegan
6	Anton Sullivan	Rhode	2-00	6	Éire Óg
6	Tony Kernan	Crossmaglen Rangers	2-00	6	Dromcollogher/Broadford
6	Alan O'Donovan	Corofin	1-03	6	Castlerea St Kevin's
6	Niall McNamee	Rhode	1-03	6	Kilmacud Crokes
6	Hugh McGinn	Newtown Blues	0-06	6	Kilmacud Crokes
6	Eric McCormack	Éire Óg	0-06	6	Colmcille
6	Mark Vaughan	Kilmacud Crokes	0-06	6	Navan O'Mahonys
6	Conleith Gilligan	Ballinderry	0-06	6	Latton O'Rahilly's
6	Oisín McConville	Crossmaglen Rangers	0-06	6	St Eunan's
6	Coilin Devlin	Ballinderry	0-06	6	Crossmaglen Rangers
6	Oisín McConville	Crossmaglen Rangers	0-06	6	Ballinderry

=== Miscellaneous ===
- Kilanerin–Ballyfad refused to compete in the Leinster Club SFC after the Leinster Council scheduled their tie with Navan O'Mahonys one day after the Wexford SFC final. Navan O'Mahonys received a walkover as a result of this decision.
- The Nire did not compete in the Munster Club SFC as the Waterford SFC had been completed by the date of its quarter-final tie. Th result of this decision was Kilmurry–Ibrickane being granted a walkover.
- Dromcollogher/Broadford won the Munster Club SFC for the first time. It was the first Limerick club team to win the provincial title.
