= 2008 Dublin Senior Football Championship =

- 2008 Craobh Sinsear Peile; Bhaile Átha Cliath

Tournament details
- County: Dublin
- Year: 2008

Winners
- Champions: Kilmacud Crokes (6th win)
- Manager: Paddy Carr
- Captain: Johnny Magee

Promotion/Relegation
- Promoted team(s): Templeogue Synge Street
- Relegated team(s): Naomh Barróg

The 2008 Dublin Senior Football Championship is the inter club Gaelic football competition between the top teams in Dublin GAA. The 2008 competition opened with group stages. The first round of the group stages began on May 8, 2008. Kilmacud Crokes finished as the 2008 champions and went on to qualify for the Leinster Senior Club Football Championship first round against Celbridge. Tomas Quinn finished the season as highest scorer with 5-34 (0-24f, 0-1 sline 0-1 pen). Dublin Champions Kilmacud Crokes progressed from the Dublin championship to win both the Leinster Senior Club Football Championship and the All-Ireland Senior Club Football Championship.

== Group stages ==
The winning team in each group qualify for a place in the quarter-finals of the competition. The team that finish in second and third position go on to the Dublin Senior B Football Championship. The teams that finish on the bottom contend the relegation championship.

=== Group One ===
Table	P	W	D	L	Pts
Ballymun Kickhams	3	2	1	0	5
St Brigids	3	2	1	0	5
Clontarf	3	1	0	2	0
St Maurs	3	0	0	3	0

==== Fixtures ====
Game	Date	Venue	Team 1	Score	Team 2	Score
Dublin SFC; First round	May 6	Parnell Park	St Brigids; Paddy Andrews 0-6 (0-1f), R Gallagher 1-1, K Darcy 0-4 (0-2f), B Cahill 1-0, Mark Cahill 0-3 (0-2f), G Norton 0-2, C Lynch 0-1.	2-07	Clontarf; A Morrissey 1-0, S McIntyre 0-3 (0-2f), P Curran, K Devine, K Spellman 0-1 each.	1-06
Dublin SFC; First round	May 7	Naul	Ballymun Kickhams; D Byrne 3-4 (0-1f), T Furman 2-2, K Leahy, D Sheehan (0-2f) 0-3 each, S Condon 1-0, A Hubbard, C Connolly 0-2 each, P McMahon 0-1.	6-17	St Maurs; C Carthy 0-3 (0-1f), O McGinty, G Quirke (0-1f) 0-1 each.	0-05
Dublin SFC; Second round	September 10	Parnell Park	St Brigids; L McCarthy 0-3 (3f), R Gallagher, K Bonner 1-0 each, A Daly, Paddy Andrews 0-2 each, Mark Cahill (f), G Norton, D Lally 0-1 each.	2-10	St Maurs; V Whelan 1-4 (1-4f), A Kelly 1-0, D Carrick 0-1.	2-05
Dublin SFC; Second round	September 13	O'Toole Park	Ballymun Kickhams; D Byrne 0-7 (4f), A Hubbard 0-3, T Furman, K Leahy, D Sheehan (f) 0-1 each.	0-13	Clontarf; S McIntyre 0-2 (1f), D Mullins, A Morrissey, G Ryan 0-1 each.	0-05
Dublin SFC; Third round	September 17	Balgriffin	Clontarf; S McIntyre 1-1, P Curran 0-4 (0-4f), G Johnston 1-0, A Morrissey 0-2 (0-1f), D Mullins, D OBrien 0-1 each.	2-09	Naomh Maur; C Moore 0-6 (0-4f), V Whelan 0-2 (0-1f, 0-1 45), J Sweetman, C Carthy 0-1 each.	0-10
Dublin SFC; Third round	September 20	Portmarnock	Ballymun Kickhams; Derek Byrne 0-6 (0-3f), I Robertson 1-0, K Connolly, R Shortall 0-1 each.	1-09	St Brigids; P Andrews 0-5, L McCarthy (1f, 1 45) K Bonner 0-3 each, D Lally 0-1.	0-12

=== Group Two ===
Kilmacud Crokes went on to qualify for the quarter-final of the Dublin Senior Football Championship while second place Round Towers and third place Raheny went on to the Dublin Senior B Football Championship. Naomh Olaf went on to fight for survival in the relegation playoffs.

Table	P	W	D	L	Pts
Kilmacud Crokes	3	3	0	0	6
Round Towers, Clondalkin	3	2	0	1	4
Raheny	3	1	0	2	2
Naomh Olaf	3	0	0	3	0

==== Fixtures ====
Game	Date	Venue	Team 1	Score	Team 2	Score
Dublin SFC; First round	May 7	O'Toole Park	Kilmacud Crokes; B O'Rorke 0-6, M Vaughan 1-3 (0-1f), L Og O hEineachain 0-4, C O'Sullivan 0-2, P Burke, N Corkery, M Davoren 0-1 each.	1-17	Naomh Olaf; F Purcell 0-3 (0-1f), E Kinsella 1-0, C Lucey, F McCann, S White 0-1 each.	1-07
Dublin SFC; First round	May 7	Finglas	Round Towers, Clondalkin; J O’Brien 0-4 (0-1f), M Taylor 0-3 (0-1f), I Ward 0-2, B Kelly, M Hallows, P Clifford, E Kelly, Derek Murray, Damien Murray, B Costello 0-1 each.	0-16	Raheny; D Ryan 0-5 (0-2f), D Henry (0-1f), J Keogh 0-4 each.	0-13
Dublin SFC; Second round	September 10	O'Toole Park	Round Towers, Clondalkin; J OBrien 1-9 (0-4f), I Ward 1-0, D Whelan, J Joyce 0-2 each, Derek Murray, E Moran, E Kelly 0-1, M Taylor 0-1 (f).	2-17	Naomh Olaf; S Whyte, D Kinsella (f), E Kinsella (2f) 0-2 each, S Hickey 0-1.	0-07
Dublin SFC; Second round	September 12	Balgriffin	Kilmacud Crokes; M Vaughan 0-6 (0-6f), B Kavanagh 0-4 (0-1f), P Burke 0-1.	0-11	Raheny; D Henry 0-3(0-3f), C Whelan, M OKeeffe, S Dempsey (0-1f) 0-1 each.	0-06
Dublin SFC; Third round	September 17	Balgriffin	Raheny; D Henry 0-6 (0-3f), S Dempsey 0-4 (0-1 45), C Henry, D Ryan 0-3 each, L Dillon 0-2.	0-18	Naomh Olaf; E Kinsella 0-6 (0-2f), D Kinsella 0-3, D Maxwell, K Lynch, B Begley 0-1 each.	0-12
Dublin SFC; Third round	September 18	Parnell Park	Kilmacud Crokes; B Kavanagh 0-5 (2f), M Vaughan 0-3 (0-2f), J Magee, L McBarron, L Óg Ó hEineacháin 0-2 each, D Magee, B O’Rorke 0-1 each.	0-16	Round Towers, Clondalkin; M Taylor (f), E Kelly, P Clifford, B Kelly 0-1 each.	0-04

=== Group Three ===
Table	P	W	D	L	Pts
Plunketts	3	3	0	0	6
Lucan Sarsfields	3	2	0	1	4
Fingallians	3	0	1	2	0
St Annes	3	0	1	2	0

==== Fixtures ====
Game	Date	Venue	Team 1	Score	Team 2	Score
Dublin SFC; First round	May 7	Parnell Park	Oliver Plunketts; A Darcy 1-5 (0-2f), G Smith 0-4 (0-2f), B Brogan 0-3 (0-1f), K McDonnell 0-1.	1-13	St Annes; N Bergin 1-1 (0-1f), D Watson, A Doran 0-1 each.	1-03
Dublin SFC; First round	May 7	Balgriffin	Fingallians; P Lawless 0-7 (0-6f), P Flynn 1-0, D Farrell 0-4, C Farrell 0-1.	1-12	Lucan Sarsfields; B Gallagher 1-4, T Brennan 0-6(0-3f), J Doyle 0-4(0-2f, 0-1 '45), P Kelly 0-2, M Twomey, M Daly, F O'Hare 0-1 each.	1-19
Dublin SFC; Second round	September 10	Parnell	Oliver Plunketts; G Smith 0-5 (2f, 1 45), D Sweeney 0-4 (4f), M Brides, J Sherlock 0-2 each, J McDonald 0-1.	0-14	Fingallians; P Lawless 0-4 (1f), L Harding 1-0, D Farrell 0-2 (1f), C Farrell, D Campion 0-1 each.	1-08
Dublin SFC; Second round	September 13	O'Toole Park	Lucan Sarsfields; J Doyle (1-0 pen, 0-3f, 0-1 45), T Brennan (0-3f) 1-5 each, D OShaughnessy 1-0, B Gallagher 0-2, F OHare, D Quinn, Alan ONeill 0-1 each.	3-15	St Annes; J Kelly 0-3 (0-1f), D Watson 0-2 (0-1f), D OBrien 0-1.	0-06
Dublin SFC; Third round	September 18	Parnell Park	Saint Oliver Plunketts/Eoghan Ruadh; B Brogan 0-4 (0-1f), J Sherlock 0-3, R McConnell (1 45), A Brogan, G Smith (1f) 0-2 each.	0-13	Lucan Sarsfields; T Brennan 0-4 (0-3f), J Doyle 0-3 (0-2f), B ONeill, M Casey, F OHare, B O’Neill, D OShaughnessy 0-1 each.	0-12
Dublin SFC; Third round	September 20	Parnell Park	Fingallians; P Lawless 0-7 (0-6f), D Farrell 1-0, P Flynn 0-2, P Murtagh 0-1.	1-10	St Annes; J Kelly 1-4 (0-2f), D OKeeffe 1-2, D Watson 0-1.	2-07

=== Group Four ===
Table	P	W	D	L	Pts
Thomas Davis	3	3	0	0	6
St Marks	3	2	0	0	4
Whitehall Colmcille	3	1	0	2	2
Ballinteer St Johns	3	0	0	3	0

==== Fixtures ====
Game	Date	Venue	Team 1	Score	Team 2	Score
Dublin SFC; First round	May 6	Blakestown	Whitehall Colmcille; S Walsh 1-1, S O’Sullivan 1-0, C Byrne 0-2 (0-1f), G O’Hagan 0-1.	2-04	Thomas Davis; E Kirby 2-1, S Smith 0-6, C Farrelly 1-2, S McGrath 0-4, P O’Connor 0-3, E Behan 0-1.	3-17
Dublin SFC; First round	May 6	Boherabreena	St Marks; D O'Callaghan (0-4f), B Kennedy (0-1f) 0-4 each, S McCann 1-0, J Kelly 0-2, D McCann 0-1.	1-11	Ballinteer St. Johns; F Ward 0-5 (0-4f), P O'Connor 0-2, J Oliver, S McCambridge, C Judge, S O'Reilly (0-1f) 0-1 each.	0-11
Dublin SFC; Second round	September 13	O'Toole Park	Thomas Davis; S McGrath 1-2, J OConnor 1-0, P OConnor 0-3 (0-3f), E Kirby, C Farrelly 0-2 each, S Smith, J Owens 0-1 each.	2-11	St Marks; D OCallaghan 0-4 (0-3f), S McCann 0-2, C Mac Fheargusa, D McCarthy, J Kelly, P Murphy (f) 0-1 each.	0-10
Dublin SFC; Second round	September 13	Blakestown	Whitehall Colmcille; C Beirne 0-6 (0-2f), A Holly (1f), S Sharpe, J Morrissey, J Bridgeman 0-1 each.	0-10	Ballinteer St Johns; P OConnor, P ODonnell, S OReilly, 0-2 each, B Gibbons, P McGlynn, F Ward 0-1 each.	0-09
Dublin SFC; Third round	September 18	Belfield	St Marks; S McCann 1-1 (0-1f), D OCallaghan, C Donoghue (0-1f) 0-3 each, J Walsh 1-0, J Kelly 0-2, P Murphy, D McCann 0-1 each.	2-11	Whitehall Colmcille; C Beirne 1-2 (0-1f), C OConnor 0-2, S OSullivan, S Walsh, G McDonald, J Bridgeman 0-1 each.	1-08
Dublin SFC; Third round	September 20	O'Toole Park	Thomas Davis; C Farrelly 3-1, S Smith 0-3 (0-1f), J OReilly 0-2, S McGrath, E Kirby 0-1 each.	3-08	Ballinteer St Johns; S OReilly 2-1, F Ward 0-4 (0-4f), P OConnor 0-1.	2-06

=== Group Five ===
Table	P	W	D	L	Pts
Ballyboden St Endas	2	2	0	0	4
Na Fianna	2	1	0	1	2
Naomh Mearnóg	2	0	0	2	0

==== Fixtures ====
Game	Date	Venue	Team 1	Score	Team 2	Score
Dublin SFC; First round	May 7	Balgriffin	Na Fianna; S Connell 0-8, B O Collarain 1-2, K O'Neill 0-3(0-2f), J McGuirk 0-2, J Cooper, J Boland, R O'Hagan 0-1 each.	1-18	Naomh Mearnóg; A Sheppard 0-3(0-1f), S Ryan Jr, C O'Driscoll 0-2 each, D O'Reilly, R O'Driscoll 0-1 each.	0-09
Dublin SFC; Second round	September 14	O'Toole Park	Ballyboden St Endas; A Kerin 1-2 (1-0 pen), S Hiney, M McAuley 1-1 each, D Homan 1-0, C Hore 0-3 (0-2f), D Davey 0-2, I Clarke, K Naughton 0-1 each.	4-11	Naomh Mearnóg; A Sheppard 0-10 (0-8f), F Doyle, A Doyle 0-1 each.	0-12
Dublin SFC; Second round	September 20	O'Toole Park	Ballyboden St Endas; C Hore 0-4 (0-4f), C Keaney 0-3 (0-2f), A Kerin 0-2, P Galvin, K Naughton 0-1 each.	0-11	Na Fianna; M O Collaráin, C Duignan (0-1f) 0-2 each, B Courtney, S Connell, B O Collaráin 0-1 each.	0-07

=== Group Six ===
Table	P	W	D	L	Pts
UCD	2	2	0	0	4
Fingal Ravens	3	2	0	1	4
Trinity Gaels	2	1	0	1	2
Naomh Barróg	3	0	0	3	0

==== Fixtures ====
Game	Date	Venue	Team 1	Score	Team 2	Score
Dublin SFC; First round	May 6	Balgriffin	Trinity Gaels; B O’Brien 0-8 (0-4f), D Kelly 1-3, C O’Keefe, S O’Connor 0-2 each, G Dillon, M Forde 0-1 each.	1-17	Naomh Barróg; J O’Rourke 0-4 (0-3f), A Grady 0-3 (0-3f), C McDonald, M Moffat, K Higgins, P Ryan 0-1 each.	0-11
Dublin SFC; First round	May 7	St Margarets	Fingal Ravens; D Kavanagh 0-3, M White, Derek Keogh, D Flanagan, I Kavanagh, G Brennan (f) 0-1 each.	0-08	UCD; J O’Loughlin 0-4 (1f), C Lyng 0-3 (2f), P Brady, D Gilhooley, C O’Dwyer 0-1 each.	0-10
Dublin SFC; Second round	September 11	Garristown	Fingal Ravens; N Tormey 0-5 (3f, 1 45, 1s), I Kavanagh 0-4 (2f, 1s), D Daly 1-1, K Kavanagh, J Morris 0-2 each.	1-14	Trinity Gaels; B O'Brien 0-7 (4f, 1s), D Kelly 1-2, M Forde, T Boylan, E McInerney 0-1 each.	1-12
Dublin SFC; Second round	September 11	Garristown	UCD; Shane Lennon 1-7 (0-3f), T Warburton 0-3, P Grady, C ODwyer 0-2, F Canavan, N Brogan 0-1 each.	1-16	Naomh Barróg; N Carey, J ORourke 0-2, N OConnor, D McCormack 0-1 each.	0-06
Dublin SFC; Third round	September 18	Balgriffin	Fingal Ravens; N Tormey 0-5 (0-3f), K Kavanagh 0-3, PJ Casey 0-2, I Kavanagh (0-1f), D Daly, B Caulfield, 0-1 each.	0-13	Naomh Barróg; J ORourke 0-3 (0-2f), P Doyle 0-2, P Garbutt, D Byrne 0-1 each.	0-07
Dublin SFC; Third round	September	Parnell Park	UCD; S Lennon 0-7 (0-4f), C ODwyer 1-0, C Lyng, M MacGabhain 0-3 each, B Teehan, F Canavan, P Brady, M McKenna 0-1 each.	3-15	Trinity Gaels; B OBrien 0-4 (0-4f), R Sheridan 0-1.	0-05

=== Group Seven ===
Table	P	W	D	L	Pts
St Vincents	2	2	0	0	4
St Sylvesters	3	2	0	1	4
St Peregrines	3	2	0	1	2
Parnells	2	0	0	2	0

==== Fixtures ====
Game	Date	Venue	Team 1	Score	Team 2	Score
Dublin SFC; First round	May 6	Portmarnock	Parnells; J Peyton 0-2(0-2f), S Mills (0-1f), P Keogh, I Skelly 0-1 each.	0-05	St Sylvesters; E Bennis 2-1 (1-0 pen), A Relihan 0-6 (0-1f), D Clarke 0-3, D Galvin 0-2, A Keaney, E Fanning, R Hazely 0-1 each.	2-15
Dublin SFC; First round	May 7	Parnell Park	St Vincents; T Quinn 1-5 (0-4f, 0-1 sline ), D Connolly 1-2, R Trainor 1-1, H Coughlan, K Golden 0-3 each, B Maloney 0-2, T Diamond, N Dunne 0-1 each.	3-18	St Peregrines; R McCarthy 0-4 (0-2f), K O'Connor, D Rooney, D Moran 0-1 each.	0-07
Dublin SFC; Second round	September 11	Balgriffin	St Peregrines; C McGuinness 1-4 (0-1f), R McCarthy 0-4 (1f), S McGuinness, J McAnaw 0-1 each.	1-10	Parnells; J Peyton 0-3 (1f), P Keogh 1-0, M Whelan 0-2, C OReilly, A Cromwell, S Cluxton (f) 0-1 each.	1-08
Dublin SFC; Second round	September 16	Balgriffin	St Vincent's; T Quinn 2-5 (0-3f), D Connolly, N Billings 0-2 each, W Lowry, G Brennan, H Coughlan, T Diamond, B Maloney 0-1 each.	2-14	St Sylvester's; S Roche 1-1, A Relihan (0-1f), D Clarke (0-2f) 0-3 each.	1-08
Dublin SFC; Third round	September 20	Portmarnock	St Sylvester's; A Relihan 3-4 (0-3f), D Clarke 0-5 (2f), E Fanning, B Sexton 0-1 each.	3-11	Peregrines; S Sweeney 1-1, R McCarthy 0-3 (2f), C McGuinness (1f) 0-2.	1-06
Dublin SFC; Third round	September	Parnell Park	St Vincents; T Quinn 1-6 (0-5f), B Maloney, K Connolly 1-0 each, A OMalley 0-3, K Golden 0-2 (1f), N Dunne, H Coughlan, N Billings, P Lee 0-1 each.	3-15	Parnells; J Peyton 0-3 (0-3f), J Dignam (0-1f), C Sugrue, I Brady 0-1 each.	0-06

=== Group Eight ===
Table	P	W	D	L	Pts
St Marys, Saggart	3	2	1	0	5
Erins Isle	3	2	1	0	5
St Judes	3	1	0	2	2
O'Tooles	3	0	0	3	0

==== Fixtures ====
Game	Date	Venue	Team 1	Score	Team 2	Score
Dublin SFC; First round	May 6	O'Toole Park	St Marys, Saggart; D Carrigan 1-2, S Cooke 0-4 (1 '45', 1f), E Murray, D Brennan 0-1 each. Erin's Isle: N Crossan 0-6, L Sweetman, J Noonan 0-2 each, G O'Connell 0-1.	1-08	Erins Isle; N Crossan 0-6, L Sweetman, J Noonan 0-2 each, G O'Connell 0-1.	0-11
Dublin SFC; First round	May 6	Parnell Park	O'Tooles; A Morris 0-3, D Mooney, E Fennell 0-2 each, P Carton, A King, M Thompson 0-1 each.	0-10	St Judes; J Donnelly 2-4 (0-2f, 0-1 45), S Gallagher 1-3, K McManamon 1-0, B McManamon 0-3, J Reilly, C Guckian, C Murphy, R O'Brien 0-1 each.	4-14
Dublin SFC; Second round	September 12	Kiltipper Road	St Mary's; B Kelly 0-5 (0-2f), E Murray 1-1, S Cooke (0-1f), S Walsh, L McGee, D Brennan 0-1 each.	1-10	St Judes; C Guckian 1-0, S Gallagher 0-2 (0-2f), P Cunningham, J Donnelly, B McManamon, T McKeown 0-1 each.	1-07
Dublin SFC; Second round	September 13	Balgriffin	Erins Isle; L Sweetman 1-1, J Noonan 0-4 (0-2f), C Flynn 1-0, K Dunne, N Crossan 0-2 each, J Carroll, P McCloskey, N Carty 0-1 each.	2-12	O'Tooles; E Fennell 0-8 (0-6f), P Bradshaw 1-0, D Farley 0-2, P Donoghue 0-1.	1-11
Dublin SFC; Third round	September 18	Balgriffin	Erins Isle; J Noonan 1-3 (0-1f), N Carthy 1-1 (0- 1f), L Sweetman, N Crossan 0-1 each.	3-05	St Judes; B McManamon 0-4 (0-2f), J Donnelly, C Guckian, S Ryan, R OBrien, D Donnelly 0-1 each.	0-09
Dublin SFC; Third round	September 20	Parnell Park	St Marys, Saggart; B Kelly (0-1f), S Cooke (0-4f) 1-6 each, P Doyle, D Carrigan, A Marshall, E Murray 0-1 each.	2-16	O'Tooles; C Farrelly 1-1, M Cunningham, D Webster, E Fennell (1f) 0-2 each, K Wilson 0-1.	1-08

== Relegation playoff ==
Game	Date	Venue	Team 1	Score	Team 2	Score
Dublin SFC; Quarter-final	October		St Maurs	0-11	Ballinteer St Johns	2-07
Dublin SFC; Quarter-final	October		Parnells*	0-00	-	0-00
Dublin SFC; Quarter-final	October		Naomh Olaf	0-11	St Annes	3-13
Dublin SFC; Quarter-final	October		Naomh Barróg	2-04	O'Tooles	3-14
Dublin SFC; Semi-final	October 18		St Maurs	3-08	Parnells	1-07
Dublin SFC; Semi-final	October		Naomh Olaf	0-09	Naomh Barróg	0-08
Dublin SFC; Final	October		Parnells	0-14	Naomh Barróg	0-09

== Quarter-finals ==
Game	Date	Venue	Team 1	Score	Team 2	Score
Dublin SFC; Quarter-final	October 5	Parnell Park	Kilmacud Crokes; B Kavanagh (0-2f), M Vaughan (0-3 45) 0-4 each, P Burke 1-0, B McGrath, K OCarroll, B ORorke 0-1 each.	1-11	UCD; C Lyng 0-2, C ODwyer, D Curran, T Warburton 0-1 each.	0-05
Dublin SFC; Quarter-final	October 4	Parnell Park	St Oliver Plunketts/ER; B Brogan 0-7 (0-2f), J Sherlock 0-6, M Brides, R McConnell (0-1 45), G Smith (0-1f), P Brogan 0-1 each.	0-17	St Mary's; S Cooke 0-5 (0-5f), B Kelly 0-3 (0-1f), D Brennan 1-0, S Walsh, L Magee, P Courtney, D Carrigan 0-1 each.	0-12
Dublin SFC; Quarter-final	October 4	Parnell Park	Ballyboden St Endas; A Kerin 2-1, C Keaney 1-2 (0-1 45), K Naughton, C Hore (0-1f), S Hiney 0-1 each.	3-06	Ballymun Kickhams; D Byrne 0-7 (0-2f), B McCullagh 2-0, T Furman 0-2, P McMahon, J Burke 0-1 each.	2-11
Dublin SFC; Quarter-final	October 5	Parnell Park	St Vincents; T Quinn 0-6 (0-4f), D Connolly, B Maloney 0-3 each, G Brennan, A OMalley 0-1 each.	0-14	Thomas Davis; P OConnor 0-5 (0-5f), C Farrelly, S Smith 0-2 each.	0-09

== Semi-finals + Final ==
Game	Date	Venue	Team 1	Score	Team 2	Score
Dublin SFC; Semi-final	October 13	Parnell Park	Kilmacud Crokes; M Vaughan 0-3 (0-2f, 0-1 45), M Davoren 1-0, P Burke, B Kavanagh (f) 0-1 each.	1-05	St Vincents; T Quinn 0-6 (0-5f), P Kelly, K Golden (0-1f) 0-1 each.	0-08
Dublin SFC; Semi-final Replay	October	Parnell Park	Kilmacud Crokes; M Vaughan 0-9 (0-6f, 0-1 sline, 0-1 45), M Davoren 1-1, P Burke 1-0, L McBarron 0-1.	2-11	St Vincents; T Quinn 1-6 (0-3f, 0-1 pen), W Lowry.	1-07
Dublin SFC; Semi-final	October 13	Parnell Park	St Oliver Plunketts/ER; B Brogan 0-7 (0-2f), J Sherlock1-1, G Smith 0-2 (0-1 45), A Darcy, D Sweeney 0-1 each.	1-12	Ballymun Kickhams; J Burke 1-1 (0-1f), R Shortall, A Hubbard, D Byrne (2f) 0-2 each, I Robertson, T Furman 0-1 each.	1-09
Dublin SFC; Final	October	Parnell Park	St Oliver Plunketts/ER; A Brogan, J Sherlock, G Smith (1f), B Brogan 0-2 each, R McConnell, D Matthews, A Darcy, D Sweeney, Paul Brogan 0-1 each.	0-13	Kilmacud Crokes; P Burke 1-2, M Vaughan 0-4 (4f), M Davoren 0-2, B McGrath, D Magee (s) 0-1 each.	1-10

== Dublin Senior Football Final Replay ==
Kilmacud Crokes	3-06 - 0-13 (final score after 60 minutes)	St Oliver Plunketts Eoghan Ruadh
Manager: Paddy Carr Team: D Nestor; K Nolan; P. Griffin; N. McGrath; B. McGrath; C. O'Sullivan; A. Morrissey; D. Magee; J. Magee 2-00; L. McBarron 0-01; B. Kavanagh 0-02; N. Corkery; M. Vaughan 0-02 (1f, 1’45); M. Davoren 1-00; P. Burke 0-03 Substitutes: C Lamb for N McGrath (inj, 7); B ORorke for McBarron (47); Ross OCarroll for Corkery (50); Kevin OCarroll for Vaughan (Inj, 55).	Half-time: 1-06 - 0-07 Competition: Dublin Senior Football Championship (Final) Date: 19.3o BST; Monday, October 27, 2008 Venue: Parnell Park, Dublin Attendance: Referee: Match rules: 60 minutes. Replay if scores still level. Maximum of 5 substitutions.	Manager: Dermot Kelly Team: E Somerville; R. O'Connor; C. Evans; P. Curtin; J. Brogan 0-01; T. Browne; M. Brides; R. McConnell; D. Mathews; G. Smith; A. Darcy; D. Sweeney; A. Brogan 0-03; B. Brogan 0-09 (2f); J. Sherlock Substitutes: N Murphy for Browne (24); Paul Brogan for Curtin (ht); K McDonnell for Darcy (43); R Glynn for Sweeney (55).

== Dublin Senior B Championship ==
The Dublin Senior B Football Championship is at the semi-final stage of the competition with 4 teams remaining.
