= Dave Billings =

Selector of Dublin Senior Football Team

Dave Billings (born 1953) was a selector for the Dublin senior football team. He worked under the management of Paul Caffrey along with his co-selectors Brian Talty and Paul Clarke. Billings was previously a co-selector along with Paul Caffrey and Paddy Canning when Tommy Lyons was manager of the Dublin Gaelic football team between from 2001 to 2004. He is a UCD Commerce graduate and was in charge of all Gaelic games on the UCD campus.

Billings died on 14 April 2015.
