= Paul Caffrey =

Dublin Gaelic footballer and manager

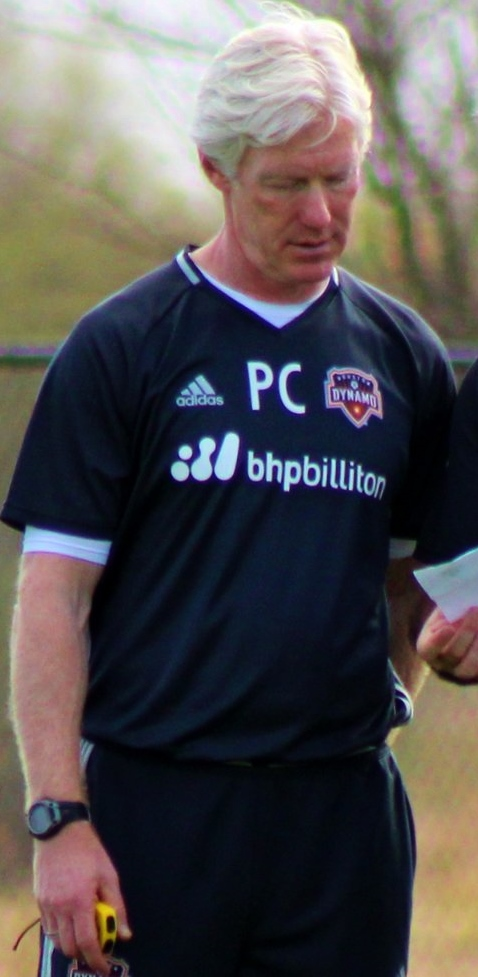

Personal information
- Nickname: Pillar
- Born: 28 June 1962 (age 64) Dublin, Ireland

Sport
- Sport: Gaelic football
Club management
- Years: Club
- 1998–2000 2015–2017: Na Fianna
	3	1	0
Inter-county management
- Years: Team
- 2004–2008: Dublin
Inter-county titles as manager
County	League	Province	All-Ireland
Dublin	0	4	4

Paul Caffrey is a former Gaelic footballer who played for the Na Fianna club and for the Dublin county team. He is also a former manager of his county team and is a Dublin-based Garda.

== Background ==
Caffrey grew up on Dorset Street on the Northside of Dublin, where his parents ran a greengrocers' shop. His football career began in St. Vincent's C.B.S. school in Glasnevin and nearby club Na Fianna. Caffrey represented his county at minor and senior level, and is a brother of John Caffrey, who won a senior All-Ireland medal in 1983.

Caffrey is a member of the Garda Síochána and is stationed at Store Street Garda Station, Dublin.

== Managerial career ==
Caffrey was a co-selector along with Dave Billings and Paddy Canning when Tommy Lyons was manager of the Dublin football team between from 2001 to 2004. During this period, Dublin won one Leinster senior, two Leinster under-21 and one All-Ireland under-21 titles. Previous to his involvement with Dublin, Caffrey was manager of Dublin club side Na Fianna, reaching the All-Ireland Club Final in 2000, where they lost to Crossmaglen Rangers of Armagh.

Caffrey succeeded Tommy Lyons as Dublin manager in November 2004. He worked with David Billings, Paul Clarke and Brian Talty as his management team for a three-year period. In his first year as manager he took Dublin to their 45th Leinster Senior Football Championship title in 2005. He repeated this feat against Offaly in the 2006 Leinster Senior Football Championship final and went on to take Dublin to the All-Ireland semi-final, where Dublin were narrowly beaten by Mayo. Caffrey received a one match ban for shouldering Mayo's John Morrison before the All-Ireland semi-final against Mayo in Croke Park. That meant that he had to watch Dublin's opening 2007 game in the Championship from the stands.

Dublin had a winning start to 2007, taking the O'Byrne Cup with a 1–18 to 2–13 win over Leinster rivals Laois in the final. The 2007 NFL brought mixed fortunes for Caffrey. Dublin were defeated in their first game in Croke Park under floodlights against Tyrone and went on to narrowly defeat Limerick in the second game with a bad performance. The third game was another defeat for Dublin which was followed by a one-sided victory over Cork. Caffrey's Dublin team finished in fifth position in the national football league and were therefore relegated to Division Two for 2008.

In Caffrey's first Championship game as manager in 2007, Dublin drew with Meath. Dublin eventually won the tie in a replay by beating Meath by 0–16 to 0–12 and thus qualified to play Offaly in the Leinster semi-final. Caffrey's decision to replace Tomás Quinn with Mark Vaughan as the freetaker proved the vital difference between the sides. Dublin's 1–12 to 0–10 victory sent them into the Leinster final against Laois. Dublin won the Leinster championship by 3–14 to 1–14 points, giving Caffrey a 100% record in Leinster for three years. Dublin played Derry in the quarter-final of the all-Ireland series and won the game by 0–18 to 0–15 to set up a semi final against Kerry for the first time since 1977. They lost that game on a 1–15 to 0–16 scoreline.

After the 2007 season, Caffrey was offered a one-year extension to his contract for 2008 to take him into his fourth year as Dublin boss. However, despite securing promotion to Division One and winning a fourth Leinster title, Caffrey resigned in the aftermath of Dublin's 12-point defeat in the All Ireland quarter-final against Tyrone. After Caffrey's resignation, both Jack O'Connor and Joe Kernan were touted as front runners. However, both ruled themselves out. Finally Pat Gilroy succeeded Caffrey.

In September 2009, Caffrey was selected as the successor to Val Andrews as the manager of Leinster interprovincial championship for entry in the Martin Donnelly Cup.

Preceded by Tommy Lyons	Dublin Senior Football Manager; 2004–2008	Succeeded by Pat Gilroy
