= Glenalbyn =

Historic house in Dublin, Ireland

Coordinates: 53.28643°N 6.198511°W

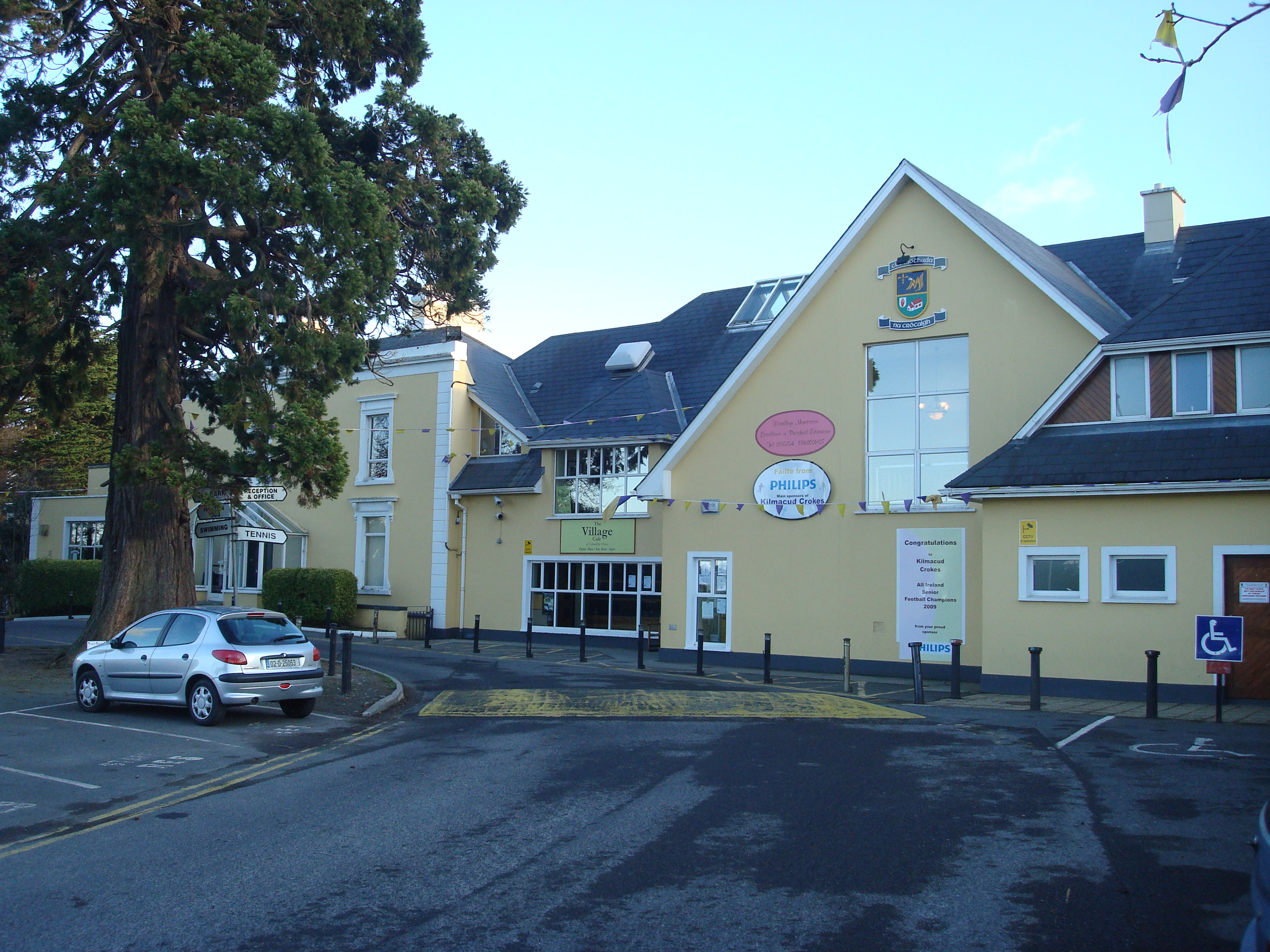
Glenalbyn, home of the Kilmacud Crokes

Glenalbyn (previously Janeville House until 1883) is a Georgian House in Stillorgan, County Dublin constructed circa 1810 which has formed part of the clubhouse complex of the Kilmacud Crokes GAA club since it was acquired in 1963.

The house was originally developed by a paper merchant named George Tinkler who named the house for his wife Jane.

== Glenalbyn House ==
The grounds called Linden Lea pitch measuring 6.5 acres (26,000 m^{2}) was purchased by Kilmacud Crokes GAA in 1963, taking ownership on 4 May 1964 and was named Páirc De Burca. Glenalbyn House was owned by the Wilkinson family and for a brief period by Captain Hartman and was then purchased in 1965 and opened in 1966. On 7 July 1996 the west wing was opened. It has dressing rooms and a gym on the ground floor with a Bar on the first floor looking out on Tennis courts. The House is now marketed as Glenalbyn Sports club and conference center.

== Swimming Pool ==
A 33 metre public swimming pool within the club grounds was operated by Dún Laoghaire–Rathdown County Council until December 2013, when it was suddenly closed due to the dangerous condition of the roof. The pool has since been filled in, with derelict buildings remaining on site. As of January 2020, official plans were being put forward to build a replacement on the same site.

== Location ==
Stillorgan, County Dublin, Ireland 7 acres, 7 miles (11 km) south of Dublin city centre.

== Sports clubs ==
Kilmacud Crokes GAA Club This club promotes Gaelic games in south County Dublin. It hosts the All Ireland 7 a side Championships every September. The club has over 5.000 members.

Glenalbyn Tennis club The club has 6 new omni pro courts.

Glenalbyn Swimming Club presently meets at either Monkstown or Loughlinstown pools.

Glenalbyn Snooker Club The club has 3 championship tables and enters in Dublin district leagues.

Glenalbyn Waterpolo Club The club has 3 teams, a senior ladies team, an under 15s team and an under 13s team.
