= John Caffrey (Gaelic footballer) =

Irish Gaelic footballer

Personal information
- Native name: Seán Mac Gafraidh (Irish)
- Born: Dublin, Ireland

Sport
- Sport: Gaelic football
- Position: -
Club
- Years: Club
- ? -?: CLG Na Fianna
Inter-county
- Years: County
- ?- ?: Dublin
Inter-county titles
- Leinster titles: 4
- All-Irelands: 1
- All Stars: 0

John Caffrey (born c. 1958) is a Gaelic footballer who played for the CLG Na Fianna club and for the Dublin county team. Caffrey won an All-Ireland Senior Football Championship medal with Dublin in 1983. He also won four leinster titles (1979, 1983, 1984 and 1985) along with two Sigerson Cup medals with UCD in 1978 and 1979. John is the brother of the previous Dublin senior football manager, Paul Caffrey. He is a teacher in St Declan's C.B.S., Nephin Road, Dublin 7.
