= Shane Supple =

Irish coach and former footballer (born 1987)

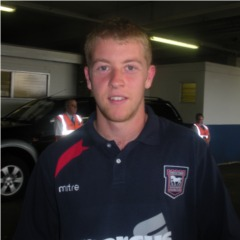
- Supple with Ipswich Town in 2009

Personal information
- Date of birth: 4 May 1987 (age 39)
- Place of birth: Dublin, Ireland
- Height: 6 ft 0 in (1.83 m)
- Position: Goalkeeper

Youth career
- Home Farm
- Ipswich Town

Senior career*
Years	Team	Apps	(Gls)
2005–2009	Ipswich Town	34	(0)
2008	→ Falkirk (loan)	4	(0)
2009	→ Oldham Athletic (loan)	5	(0)
2016–2018	Bohemians	75	(0)
Total		118	(0)

International career
2008	Republic of Ireland U21	1	(0)
- * Club domestic league appearances and goals

Shane Supple (born 4 May 1987) is an Irish coach and former footballer who played as a goalkeeper.

In 2015, he made a return to competitive football, after initially retiring in 2009, by signing for non-league Crumlin United, before returning to top-flight football in 2016 when he signed for Bohemians

Prior to his initial retirement, he spent his career mainly with Ipswich Town, having been a graduate of Ipswich's youth system. He also played for Falkirk and Oldham Athletic and was capped once by the Republic of Ireland U21 side.

== Club career ==
=== Ipswich Town ===
In the 2004–05 season, he was part of the FA Youth Cup-winning Ipswich team. On 13 August 2005 he made his first appearance for the Ipswich first team, when an injury to first-choice goalkeeper Lewis Price forced Supple to play for an hour of the match against Leicester City; Supple kept a clean sheet. He retained the number one spot for Ipswich Town, and in the summer of 2006, Charlton Athletic made a number of bids for the Republic of Ireland player, but Ipswich manager Jim Magilton rejected all them. Leeds United also showed interest but Ipswich informed the public that no bid had been made. He mainly featured among the Ipswich substitutes during the 2006–07 season with Lewis Price being first-choice keeper.

In the summer of 2007, Price was sold to Derby County, and Scottish international Neil Alexander was signed after having been released by Cardiff City at the end of the 2006–07 season. Alexander was the first-choice goalkeeper in the 2007–08 season, consigning Supple once again to the bench. In 2008, Alexander left Ipswich, in a move to Rangers for an undisclosed fee. Stephen Bywater was immediately brought in on loan from Derby County, while Supple was allowed to move to Falkirk on loan. Ahead of the 2008–09 season, Ipswich signed former player, Richard Wright from West Ham United. The former Arsenal, Everton and Southampton was made first-choice keeper.

On 26 February 2009 Supple was linked with a loan move to Grimsby Town, but this was put on hold by Ipswich in order for the club to find a replacement for the departing keeper. Subsequently, the move fell through.

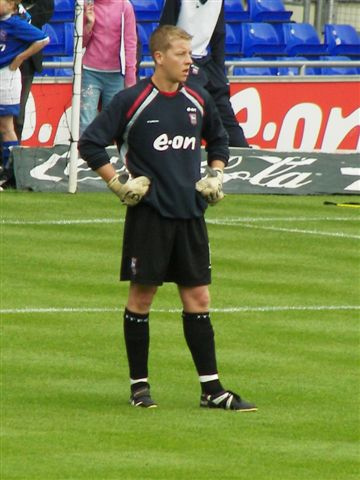
Supple with Ipswich Town during the 2006–07 season

==== Falkirk (loan) ====
On 31 January 2008, Supple, along with teammate Billy Clarke joined Scottish Premier League club Falkirk on loan. Supple was signed due to the injury to Falkirk's first choice goalkeeper Tim Krul, where he made four appearances for the Bairns.

==== Oldham Athletic (loan) ====
Supple was loaned out to League One side Oldham Athletic on 18 March 2009, following Ipswich Town's signing of Polish goalkeeper, Bartosz Białkowski until the end of the season.

=== Retirement from football ===
Supple played his last professional game in the League Cup against Shrewsbury Town on 11 August 2009, a game in which Supple saved a penalty from Jake Robinson in the shootout to help his side progress to the next round. Nine days later, Ipswich Town announced that they had agreed to cancel Supple's contract at the request of the player, allowing him to pursue a career outside professional soccer. He said that he had "fallen out of love with the game" and wished to pursue a different career path. His desire to play Gaelic football with the Dublin county team was a major motivating factor.

=== Return to football ===
Supple returned to playing football when he signed for intermediate club Crumlin United in 2015. On 15 June 2016, it was announced that he had signed with League of Ireland side Bohemians, marking his return to top-flight football. Supple made his first team debut on 9 July 2016 in a mid-season friendly at home to Portsmouth. He made his league debut for Bohemians in a 1–0 defeat to Derry City at Dalymount Park. He would go on to be voted Bohemians Player of the Year for the 2018 season. Supple announced his retirement from football in November 2018 due to an ongoing hip injury.

== International career ==
Supple has represented the Republic of Ireland at under-21 level, his only cap in a UEFA European Under-21 qualification game at home to Montenegro on 25 March 2008, which ended 1-1.

He was called up to the Republic of Ireland side on 21 May 2018 by Martin O'Neill ahead of upcoming friendlies against France and the USA.

== Coaching career ==
In January 2021, he was named as Gaelic football goalkeeping coach of the Meath under-20 county team under the management of Bernard Flynn.

When Flynn prepared his management team to succeed Andy McEntee as Meath senior manager when that vacancy next arose in 2022, Supple was included. However, Colm O'Rourke was then appointed manager instead of Flynn. Supple later joined O'Rourke's management team as goalkeeping coach.

== Career statistics ==
Appearances and goals by club, season and competition
Club	Season	Division	League		National Cup		League Cup		Other		Total	
Club	Season	Division	Apps	Goals	Apps	Goals	Apps	Goals	Apps	Goals	Apps	Goals
Ipswich Town	2005–06	Championship	22	0	1	0	0	0	–		23	0
Ipswich Town	2006–07	Championship	12	0	1	0	0	0	–		13	0
Ipswich Town	2007–08	Championship	0	0	0	0	0	0	–		0	0
Ipswich Town	2008–09	Championship	0	0	0	0	1	0	–		1	0
Ipswich Town	2009–10	Championship	0	0	0	0	1	0	–		1	0
Ipswich Town	Total		34	0	2	0	2	0	0	0	38	0
Falkirk (loan)	2007–08	Scottish Premiership	4	0	0	0	0	0	–		4	0
Oldham Athletic (loan)	2008–09	League One	5	0	0	0	0	0	0	0	5	0
Bohemians	2016	Premier Division	10	0	0	0	0	0	0	0	10	0
Bohemians	2017	Premier Division	32	0	0	0	0	0	0	0	32	0
Bohemians	2018	Premier Division	33	0	0	0	0	0	1 (Note: Appearance in Scottish Challenge Cup)	0	33	0
Bohemians	Total		75	0	0	0	0	0	1	0	76	0
Career total			118	0	2	0	2	0	1	0	123	0

== Honours ==
Ipswich Town

- FA Youth Cup: 2004–05

Individual

- PFAI Team of the Year: 2018 Premier Division
- Bohemians Player of the Year: 2018

== Gaelic football career ==
Shane Supple
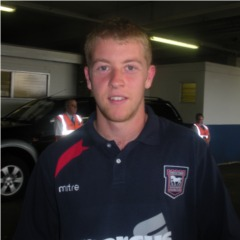

Personal information
- Born: 4 May 1987 (age 39) Castleknock, Dublin
- Height: 6 ft 1 in (185 cm)

Sport
- Sport: Gaelic Football
- Position: Goalkeeper
Club
- Years: Club
- 2010–2016: St Brigid's
Club titles
- Dublin titles: 1
Inter-county
- Years: County
- 2010–2015: Dublin
Inter-county titles
- Leinster titles: 3
- All-Irelands: 2
- NFL: 1

Supple plays Gaelic football, also as a goalkeeper, for St Brigid's.

In 2010, he became a member of the senior Dublin county football team, being substitute goalkeeper for their NFL game against Mayo in March, although he did not play any part in the game.

Supple excelled in his first full season with his home club St Brigid's, acting as vice-captain during their run to the final of the 2010 Dublin Senior Football Championship. Supple was nominated for a Blue Star award due to his performances for Brigid's during the season.

In November 2011, Brigid's won the Dublin Senior Football Championship.
