= St Mac Dara's Community College =

Second-level school in Templeogue, Dublin, Ireland

- Coláiste Pobail Mhic Dara Naofa

Location
- Templeogue, Dublin 6W; Ireland; 53.2972°N 6.3268°W

Information
- Motto: Ar Aghaidh (Forward)
- Established: 1982
- Principal: Frances Gibson
- Staff: 60
- Years offered: 6
- Gender: mixed-sex
- Age: 12 to 18
- Enrolment: 867 (2018)
- Colours: Grey and blue
- Website: Official website

St Mac Dara's Community College (Irish: Coláiste Pobail Mhic Dara Naofa) is a secondary school situated on Wellington Lane in the suburb of Templeogue in Dublin, Ireland. It is run by a board of management appointed by the Dublin and Dún Laoghaire Education and Training Board (ETB; previously the County Dublin Vocational Education Committee (CDVEC)) and the Catholic Archdiocese of Dublin, and including community representatives, and is a non-fee paying school.

== History ==
The school was founded in 1982, under the County Dublin Vocational Education Committee (C.D.V.E.C), after a campaign for a school in the Willington area. It started with 66 pupils, and has since reached a population of over 800. The Catholic archbishop assigned the Marist Order to oversee the school for the diocese. A site on Wellington Lane was secured, and the official opening ceremony was held in May 1984. Derek Ward has been the principal since 2019.

In 2007/2008, to mark the school's 25th anniversary, a number of celebration events were held. The then Minister for Education and Science, Mary Hanafin, visited the school on 5 March 2008 as a guest of honour to celebrate the 25th anniversary of the school.

In 2016, the school held two commemorative days for the centenary of the 1916 Easter Rising. Guests speakers included a former teacher, deputy president of DCU, Daire Keogh.

== Academics ==
St Mac Dara's accommodates both Junior Certificate and Leaving Certificate students. As of 2018 the school was ranked sixth in Ireland in terms of the number of students who progressed to third level and by the types of institution to which the students progressed.

It has an optional Transition Year programme.

== Facilities ==
St Mac Dara's facilities include four science laboratories, three home economics classrooms with appliances, two art classrooms, two woodwork classrooms, two engineering classrooms, two technical graphics rooms and over 40 classrooms. There is also a physical education hall / gymnasium on the school grounds. The school was selected in 2010 as one of 100 schools to be part of the Government's 100mbits Broadband Initiative, and every classroom was fitted with a smartboard, projector and a 100 Mbit/s broadband enabled laptop.

== Extra-curricular activities ==
=== Sport ===
The school's sporting and extra curricular activities include Gaelic football, hurling, soccer, rugby, basketball, golf and canoeing. In 2012, St Mac Dara's won both the Dublin and Leinster Senior Football Championships.

=== Societies and events ===
The school has a number of voluntary organisations and societies, including a history society, choir, orchestra, Irish-language groups and an Amnesty International group, which organises an annual Fair Trade Fair and other fundraisers throughout the year.

The school has tradition of charity fundraising and, in 2010, the school raised more money for Trócaire than any other school in Ireland. Annual fundraising activities undertaken by the college's students include a sponsored 24-hour fast, a table quiz, and a soccer marathon. A group of students traveled to Honduras/Nicaragua in 2005 as part of a charity project.

== Governance ==
The school is overseen by a Board of Management, appointed by the Education and Training Board and the Catholic Archdiocese of Dublin, and including parental, community and teaching representatives. It has an advisory student council.

== Popular culture ==
In October 2006, St MacDara's was used to shoot a scene in the film Assault of Darkness starring Vinnie Jones. Some of the fourth and fifth year students were used as extras in the scene, which was filmed in one of the science rooms.

== Notable alumni ==
- Pat Burke, former Dublin Gaelic footballer
- Lauryn Canny, actress
- Ken Early, sports journalist
- Kerrie Ann Keogh, pop singer
- Kevin McManamon, Dublin Gaelic footballer
- Ryan O'Dwyer, Dublin hurler
- Aidan Power, presenter
- Aidan Turner, actor
- Fintan Warfield, politician
- Lance Daly, Director (1st year only)
