= Craig Dias =

Irish Gaelic footballer

Personal information
- Born: Dublin, Ireland

Sport
- Sport: Gaelic football
- Position: Left Half Back
Club
- Years: Club
- Kilmacud Crokes
Club titles
- Dublin titles: 2
- Leinster titles: 2
- All-Ireland Titles: 1
Inter-county
- Years: County
- 2011-2012: Dublin
Inter-county titles
- Leinster titles: 2
- All-Irelands: 2
- NFL: 2
- All Stars: 0

Craig Dias is a Gaelic footballer who plays for the Kilmacud Crokes club and for the Dublin county team. He made his league debut for Dublin against Kerry at Croke Park in February 2012. He won the all-Ireland senior football championship with Dublin in 2011 as a squad member. Craig made his championship debut scoring two points against Louth in the quarter-finals of the Leinster Senior Football Championship.
