= Des Newton (Gaelic footballer) =

Roscommon and Donegal Gaelic footballer and manager

Personal information
- Born: County Roscommon, Ireland

Sport
- Sport: Gaelic football
- Position: Back
Club
- Years: Club
- Carndonagh(Donegal)
Inter-county
- Years: County
- 1976–1992? c. 1983–1988?: Roscommon; Donegal
Inter-county titles
- Connacht/Ulster titles: 3+1

Des Newton is an Irish former Gaelic footballer and manager who played for the Roscommon and Donegal county teams from the 1970s until the 1990s.

== Career ==
Newton won three Connacht Senior Football Championship titles and an All-Ireland Under-21 Football Championship in 1978 with Roscommon.

Newton also played for the Donegal County team. He won an Ulster Senior Football Championship in 1983, with manager Brian McEniff turning to Newton (then living in Inishowen) as a replacement for Matt Gallagher, who sustained a hand injury before the semi-final and missed the Ulster SFC final and All-Ireland SFC semi-final with appendicitis.

As a manager, Newton has been involved with Dublin GAA clubs Kilmacud Crokes and St Jude's for several years, and served as a selector. In 2011, he was appointed manager of the Roscommon senior team but stood down after the 2012 season.

== Honours ==
- All-Ireland Under-21 Football Championship: 1978
- Connacht Senior Football Championship: 1980, 1990&1991
- Ulster Senior Football Championship: 1983
