= Pat Burke (Gaelic footballer) =

Irish Gaelic footballer

Pat Burke (born 1983 or 1984) is a Gaelic footballer who played club football for Kilmacud Crokes and as an inter-county played for Dublin and Clare. He was a member of the Kilmacud Crokes team that won the 2009 All-Ireland Senior Club Football Championship final. He played with Dublin in the 2011 National Football League final, losing to Cork. He transferred to Clare in late 2014, and was a member of the Clare team that won the 2016 NFL Division 3 final. In late 2016, he announced that he "would not be continuing" with the Clare squad for the 2017 season. As of 2022, he was a member of the coaching team for the St Mac Dara's Community College schoolboy squad that won the Dublin Schools Senior 'C' Football Championship title.
