= Tommy Lyons =

Irish Gaelic football manager and player

Tommy Lyons is an Irish former Gaelic football manager and player from County Mayo who managed two inter-county teams. He was also a regular panellist/analyst on RTÉ's The Sunday Game. Although born in County Mayo, Lyons considers himself a Dubliner, having moved to Dublin at a very young age.

== Career ==
=== Club ===
Lyons's playing career with Dublin GAA club Kilmacud Crokes ended early due to a persistent knee injury. A screw had to be placed within the knee at one point, which hindered his running ability. Lyons managed Kilmacud Crokes to an All-Ireland Club SFC on Saint Patrick's Day, 1995. He also spent time as chairman of Crokes, until 2007.

=== 1997–1999: Offaly ===
Lyons was announced as senior Offaly county football team manager in late 1996. In his first year in charge, in 1997, the team won a Leinster Senior Football Championship, defeating then All-Ireland Senior Football Championship (SFC) title holders Meath in the final. Mayo defeated Offaly in the next game, that year's All-Ireland SFC semi-final. Offaly followed this championship run with a National Football League title in 1998. They were beaten early in both the 1998 and 1999 Leinster SFCs. Following this, Lyons and Offaly parted ways. Lyons was reported to have "retired" as Offaly manager. Lyons returned to his position as an analyst on The Sunday Game.

- O'Byrne Cup (2): 1997 1998
- Leinster Senior Football Championship (1): 1997
- National Football League (1): 1998

=== 2002–2004: Dublin ===
A full record of the performance of Dublin between 2002 and 2004 is available at:

Lyons was confirmed as manager of the Dublin senior football team in October 2001. Dublin had a poor league campaign and only avoided relegation following an away draw with Galway on the last day. Dublin came into the All-Ireland SFC as rank outsiders for the first time in many years and, following a poor performance over Wexford, Dublin's chances were dismissed further. Dublin also faced a tricky Leinster SFC semi-final against Meath, a team Dublin had not defeated for seven years. Lyons risked bringing in a lot of inexperienced players, such as Ray Cosgrove, Alan Brogan, and John McNally. Dublin won, defeating Meath with each of the new additions playing well, particularly Cosgrove, who scored 2–2. Dublin later won the Leinster SFC, defeating Kildare in the final, and reached the All-Ireland SFC semi-final after a replay with Donegal. In the semi-final, against Armagh, Dublin was favourite but lost by a point.

Lyons had played a media game during his first year in charge. When the standard of the team's performances dropped in 2003, the media game Lyons had played came back to haunt him. Lyons's success in his first year was not repeated in the following two years, with Dublin failing to win a Leinster SFc title or to play in an All-Ireland SFC semi-final. Lyons and the media's relationship deteriorated such that by the summer of 2004, he refused to reveal his team selection to the media until minutes before throw-in.

=== Celebrity Bainisteoir ===
In 2008, Lyons mentored Glenda Gilson as she "managed" Crumlin for RTÉ's Celebrity Bainisteoir.

== Media ==
Lyons, one of a string of former Dublin managers never to have won an All-Ireland SFC title, bit into Martin McHugh ahead of the 2012 All-Ireland Senior Football Championship Final, charging McHugh with "being the cute auld hoor". McHugh, being a native of Donegal, whose team were to take on Lyons's native county Mayo in that game.

| Preceded by Tommy Carr | Dublin Senior Football Manager; 2002–2005 | Succeeded by Paul Caffrey |
