= Mark Davoren =

Irish Gaelic football player

Personal information
- Born: Dublin, Ireland

Sport
- Sport: Gaelic football
- Position: Full Forward
Club
- Years: Club
- ?–present: Kilmacud Crokes
Club titles
- Dublin titles: 1
- Leinster titles: 1
Inter-county**
Years	County	Apps (scores)
2009–present	Dublin	0 (0-00)
Inter-county titles
- Leinster titles: 0
- **Inter County team apps and scores correct as of (22:31, 18 August 2006 (UTC)).

Mark Davoren is an Irish Gaelic footballer who plays for the Kilmacud Crokes club and for the Dublin county team.

He made his debut for Dublin against Kerry in the National Football League (Ireland) in 2009 scoring a total of 1–03 in the game which finished as a draw in Parnell Park. He won an All-Ireland Senior Club Football Championship medal with Kilmacud Crokes on St Patricks Day 2009 in Croke Park against Crosmaglen Rangers. He scored a goal in the game. Davoren won a Leinster Senior Club Football Championship medal with Crokes against Rhode of Offalyin 2008 at Parnell Park, he scored 1–00 in the final. He won the Dublin Senior Football Championship in 2008 by beating St Oliver Plunketts/Eoghan Ruadh in Parnell Park scoring a goal in the process. He won an AFL Dublin Division One title with Kilmacud Crokes in 2008, although he did not make an appearance in the league final.

On 7 June 2009, he suffered a torn cruciate ligament during the Leinster Championship victory over Meath, which ruled him out for the rest of the season.
