= Liam Óg Ó hÉineacháin =

Irish Gaelic footballer

Personal information
- Native name: Liam Óg Ó hÉineacháin (Irish)

Sport
- Sport: Gaelic football
Club
- Years: Club
- Kilmacud Crokes
Club titles
- Dublin titles: 1
Inter-county
- Years: County
- Dublin

Liam Óg Ó hÉineacháin is a Gaelic footballer for the Dublin GAA club Kilmacud Crokes. He formerly played for the Dublin county team. He won the Dublin Senior Football Championship with Kilmacud in October 2008 at Parnell Park. Ó hÉineacháin was a panelist against St Oliver Plunketts Eoghan Ruadh but was being rested for the Leinster Senior Club Football Championship. He scored a total of 0-06 in the 2008 Dublin Championship.
