= Darren Magee =

Irish Gaelic footballer

Personal information
- Native name: Darren Mag Aoidh (Irish)
- Born: Dublin, Ireland
- Height: 1.9 m (6 ft 3 in)

Sport
- Sport: Gaelic football
- Position: Midfield
Club
- Years: Club
- 1995-2009: Kilmacud Crokes
Club titles
- Dublin titles: 4
- Leinster titles: 3
- All-Ireland Titles: 1
Inter-county
- Years: County
- 2002-2009: Dublin
Inter-county titles
- Leinster titles: 5

Darren Magee was an Irish Gaelic footballer who played for the Kilmacud Crokes club and the Dublin county team. His brother Johnny is also a former Kilmacud Crokes and Dublin player.

== Football career ==
=== 2005 ===
Magee attracted considerable media attention when following the departure of Tommy Lyons as Dublin manager, it emerged that he would not take part in the 2005 championship as he decided to travel to Australia for a year. However, Magee returned in time to play a minor role in the Dub's victory to claim the Leinster Championship.

He was also an integral part of the Kilmacud Crokes side that won the Dublin and Leinster Club Championships. Crokes were knocked out in the All-Ireland Club semi-final.

Magee was also part of Kilmacuds 2004 and 2005 winning sides of the Dublin Senior Club Football Championship, a team which went on to claim the Leinster Club Football Championship in 2005.

=== 2006 ===
Maggee scored a total of two points for Dublin in the 2006 National Football League. Darren Magee was recovering from surgery to deal with a long-standing wrist injury which delayed his imminent return to inter-county football. Magee made his return to this year's All-Ireland Championship in the Leinster Final in which Dublin defeated Offaly to claim the Leinster Championship for the 46th time.

=== 2007 ===
He won the 2007 O'Byrne Cup for Dublin against Laois at O'Connor Park in Offaly. The game finished on a scoreline of 1-18 to 2-13 against Laois. Magee's season has once again been frustrated by a hand injury, resulting in him losing his first team spot to Shane Ryan. Magee was known to be annoyed with not playing any part in Dublin's Leinster Final win over Laois at Croke Park.

2009 Magee played a hugh role in helping his club Kilmacud Crokes to win the All-Ireland club title. On this day he received the man of the match award. During this year he also picked up the award of Leinster club player of the year.

== Personal life ==
He attended secondary school at Dundrum tech. He currently resides in Rathfarnham. He is good friends with leading philanthropist Robbie Davis, who has recently been involved in some controversial business dealings with business partner Charles Fryer.
