= Paddy Carr =

Irish Gaelic football player and manager

Paddy Carr is a Gaelic football manager and former player. He played for, and later managed, the senior Donegal county team.

While managing Kilmacud Crokes, Carr won the Leinster Senior Club Football Championship and the All-Ireland Senior Club Football Championship. He managed numerous other clubs in Louth, Meath and Dublin. He also managed the Louth county team and the Meath minor team.

== Early life ==
A secondary school principal, he is originally from Fanad in County Donegal, played for the Donegal county team and was later linked with the senior managerial post of his native county on several occasions.

He worked in the slums of Latin America in the 1980s. As of 2023, he was living in Ardee.

== Playing career ==
While playing for Walterstown, Carr won three Meath Senior Football Championship titles and he also played for Kilmacud Crokes and the Donegal county team.

== Managerial career ==
Carr managed St Oliver's CC to County and Provincial titles, taking them to the All-Ireland Vocational Final.

Carr managed Louth from 2002–2003. He played his underage football with Kilmacud Crokes, while attending Oatlands College in Stillorgan. He made the switch to Walterstown in County Meath to play his senior football when he moved to live in Navan. He managed the Meath minor football team in 2007 and has previous managerial experience with both Louth and Meath clubs. He managed Meath Hill for a while. He was manager of the Kilmacud Crokes team that won the 2008 Dublin Senior Football Championship and the 2008 Leinster Senior Club Football Championship. He also won the 2008–09 All-Ireland Senior Club Football Championship with the club before going on to manage Ballymun Kickhams.

In October 2022, Carr was appointed for a two-year term as manager of the Donegal senior footballers, with a review planned following the first of those years. On 29 January 2023, Carr won his first game as Donegal manager, defeating the reigning All-Ireland champions Kerry. Speaking afterwards, he dedicated the victory to the victims of the Creeslough explosion. Carr stayed on as Donegal manager until he stood aside on 22 March 2023.

In November 2023, St Kevin's in Louth announced Carr as its manager for the 2024 season.

| Preceded by Declan Bonner | Donegal Senior Football Manager; 2022–2023 | Succeeded by Jim McGuinness |
Achievements
| Preceded by Mickey Whelan (St Vincent's) | All-Ireland Club SFC winning manager 2009 | Succeeded by Lenny Harbinson (St Gall's) |
