= Barry O'Rorke =

Irish hurler and Gaelic footballer

Personal information
- Native name: Barra Ó Rúairc (Irish)
- Born: 3 March 1989 (age 37) Dublin, Ireland

Sport
- Sport: Hurling
- Football Position: Right corner forward
- Hurling Position: Left corner forward
Club
- Years: Club
- 2007-: Kilmacud Crokes
Club titles
| | Football | Hurling |
| Dublin titles | 2 | 1 |
| Leinster titles | 2 | |
| All-Ireland titles | 1 | |

Barry O'Rorke or baz (born 3 March 1989) is an inter-county Gaelic footballer and hurler for Dublin. He plays his club hurling and football with Kilmacud Crokes and has been a member of the senior panel in both codes. He received his secondary education at the Irish medium school Coláiste Eoin in County Dublin. In 2007, O'Rorke received a sports scholarship to University College Dublin (UCD) for his contributions in both Gaelic football and hurling. O'Rorke is a speaker of the Irish language and is noted for saying his Leinster championship speech in the language in June 2007. He is the brother of former Under-21 Dublin hurling player Shane O'Rorke "shaz" and Dublin minor hurling player Oisin O'Rorke "Oiaz".

== Playing career ==
=== Football ===
He played with Dublin in the Leinster Minor Football Championship in 2007 but failed to make the final after losing to Laois. In 2008, O'Rorke started at corner forward the first round U21 Football Championship match against Kildare which Dublin lost by one point. O'Rorke kicked two points from play. On 27 October 2008 Barry won his first Dublin Senior Football Championship at Parnell Park with an appearance as substitute. He then went on to win, a Leinster Senior Club Football Championship title and then an All-Ireland Senior Club Football Championship medal on St Patrick's day in 2009. He won a Dublin and Leinster Senior Football Championship medal with Kilmacud Crokes for the second time in 2010. He won the Leinster and All-Ireland Under-21 Football Championship with Dublin in 2010.

=== Hurling ===
He began his campaign in the Leinster Minor Hurling Championship against Wexford as team captain of the Dublin minor hurling team for 2007. Dublin beat Wexford by 1–13 to 0–06 to qualify for the final against Kilkenny. O'Rorke won the 2007 Leinster championship with Dublin by 2–14 to 1–10 at Croke Park. He scored a total of 1–02 in the game. O'Rorke also had club success in 2007 as Kilmacud Crokes won the Dublin Minor Hurling Championship scoring a total of 1-04. He won the Dublin Senior Hurling Championship with Kilmacud Crokes in 2012 against Cuala at Parnell Park, he scored during the game.
