= Rory O'Carroll =

Dublin Gaelic footballer and hurler

Personal information
- Native name: Ruaidhrí Ó Cearbhail (Irish)
- Born: 30 November 1989 (age 36) Dublin, Ireland
- Height: 1.85 m (6 ft 1 in)

Sport
- Sport: Gaelic football
- Position: Full Back
Club
- Years: Club
- 2006–: Kilmacud Crokes
Club titles
	Football	Hurling
Dublin titles	2	1
Leinster titles	2	0
All-Ireland titles	2	0
Inter-county
Years	County	Apps (scores)
2009–	Dublin	30 (0–0)
Inter-county titles
- Leinster titles: 5
- All-Irelands: 3
- NFL: 3
- All Stars: 2

Rory O'Carroll (born 30 November 1989) is a footballer and hurler with Dublin and Kilmacud Crokes. He lined out as the full back on the Dublin senior football team. He is the brother of inter-county footballer and hurler Ross O'Carroll, inter-county hurler Bill O’Carroll and Oisin O'Carroll. Rory O'Carroll made his debut for Dublin against Kerry in March 2009.

== Playing career ==
O'Carroll holds two All-Ireland medals. In 2009, he won an All-Ireland Senior Club Football Championship winners medal with Kilmacud Crokes and in 2010, he won the All-Ireland Under 21 Football Championship with Dublin. He was named on the team chosen as the best 15 players at Under-21 level between 2005 and 2010. O'Carroll won the Leinster Senior Football Championship with Dublin in July 2011 at Croke Park against Wexford. He won the All-Ireland Senior Football Championship with Dublin in September 2011 against Kerry at Croke Park.

== Personal ==
O'Carroll went to Oatlands in Stillorgan, and was a student in University College Dublin (UCD), where he studied French and History and played for the college GAA teams. He is also well known for engaging in charitable work in Dublin's inner city, in particular Brother Kevin's Capuchin centre in Smithfield. He is also a keen and capable Irish speaker.

== Honours ==
Football

- All-Ireland Senior Football Championship (3): 2011, 2013, 2015
- Leinster Senior Football Championship (5): 2011, 2012, 2013, 2014, 2015
- All-Ireland Under-21 Football Championship (1): 2010
- Leinster Under-21 Football Championship (2): 2009, 2010
- All-Ireland Senior Club Football Championship (1): 2009
- Leinster Senior Club Football Championship (2): 2008, 2010
- Dublin Senior Football Championship (2): 2008, 2010

Hurling

- Dublin Senior Hurling Championship (1): 2012
- Leinster Under-21 Hurling Championship (1): 2010
- Leinster Minor Hurling Championship (1): 2007

Awards
Preceded by Colm O'Neill (Cork)	U21 Footballer of the Year; 2010	Succeeded by Tom Flynn (Galway)
