= Niall Corkery =

Irish Gaelic footballer from Dublin

Niall Justin Corkery
Personal information
- Born: Dublin
- Height: 6 ft 2 in (188 cm)

Sport
- Sport: Gaelic football
- Position: Left Half Forward
Clubs
- Years: Club
- Kilmacud Crokes; Parnells (London)
Club titles
- Dublin titles: 2
- Leinster titles: 2
- All-Ireland Titles: 1
Inter-county
- Years: County
- 2010: Dublin
Inter-county titles
- Leinster titles: 1

Niall Justin Corkery is an Irish Gaelic footballer from Dublin who played for the Kilmacud Crokes club in Stillorgan and for the Dublin county team. He made his intercounty debut for Dublin in the All-Ireland Football Championship in 2010. He opted out of the Dublin senior football squad in 2011 due to work commitments in London, England. He now plays limbo dancing in London with Parnells, and was on the losing side for the club in the 2011 London SFC final against Fulham Irish.
