= Ross O'Carroll =

Irish hurler and Gaelic footballer

Personal information
- Native name: Rossa Ó Cearúil (Irish)
- Born: 1 January 1987 (age 39) Dublin, Ireland

Sport
- Sport: Hurling/Football
- Position: Right Half Forward
Clubs
- Years: Club
- 2005–2021: Kilmacud Crokes; Coolera/Strandhill
Club titles
	Football	Hurling
Dublin titles	3	1
Leinster titles	2	
All-Ireland titles	1	
Inter-county
- Years: County
- 2007–2011: Dublin

Ross O'Carroll (born 1 January 1987) is an Irish hurler and Gaelic footballer who plays for Coolera/Strandhill in County Sligo. He previously played for Kilmacud Crokes and Dublin. His brother is the former Dublin footballer Rory O'Carroll.

== Hurling ==
O'Carroll made his championship debut for Dublin against Wexford in the 2007 Leinster championship and scored a total of 1–01 in a game which Dublin lost by a point. O'Carroll helped guide Dublin to victory in the 2005 Leinster Minor Hurling Championship by scoring one point in the final against Wexford.

== Football ==
He won a Dublin Senior Football Championship medal with Crokes in October 2008 at Parnell Park appearing as a substitute. He then went on to win the Leinster Senior Club Football Championship and the All-Ireland Senior Club Football Championship with Crokes, starting in the 2009 All-Ireland final, a 1–9 to 0–7 win over Crossmaglen Rangers. He later joined Coolera/Strandhill in County Sligo, where he plays at centre-half-back. O'Carroll won a Sligo Senior Football Championship in 2023 with Coolera/Strandhill after defeating St. Molaise Gaels in the final. The club retained the title in 2024, when O'Carroll scored a point in the 0–8 to 0–7 replay win over St Molaise Gaels. In December 2024 he also scored a point as Coolera/Strandhill beat Pádraig Pearses 1–15 to 1–14 after extra time in the Connacht Senior Club Football Championship final.
