= Kilmacud Crokes GAA =

Sports club in County Dublin, Ireland

Kilmacud Crokes
- Cill Mochuda Na Crócaigh
- Founded: 1959
- County: Dublin
- Nickname: Crokes
- Colours: Purple and gold
- Grounds: Páirc de Burca, Stillorgan; Silverpark, Leopardstown
- Coordinates: 53°17′14.50″N 6°11′58.93″W

Playing kits
Home Kit	Change Kit

Senior Club Championships
	All Ireland	Leinster champions	Dublin champions
Football:	3	7	11
Hurling:	0	0	7
Ladies' football:	0	4	4

Kilmacud Crokes (Irish: Cill Mochuda Na Crócaigh) is a large Gaelic Athletic Association club located in Stillorgan, Dublin, Ireland.

== Background ==
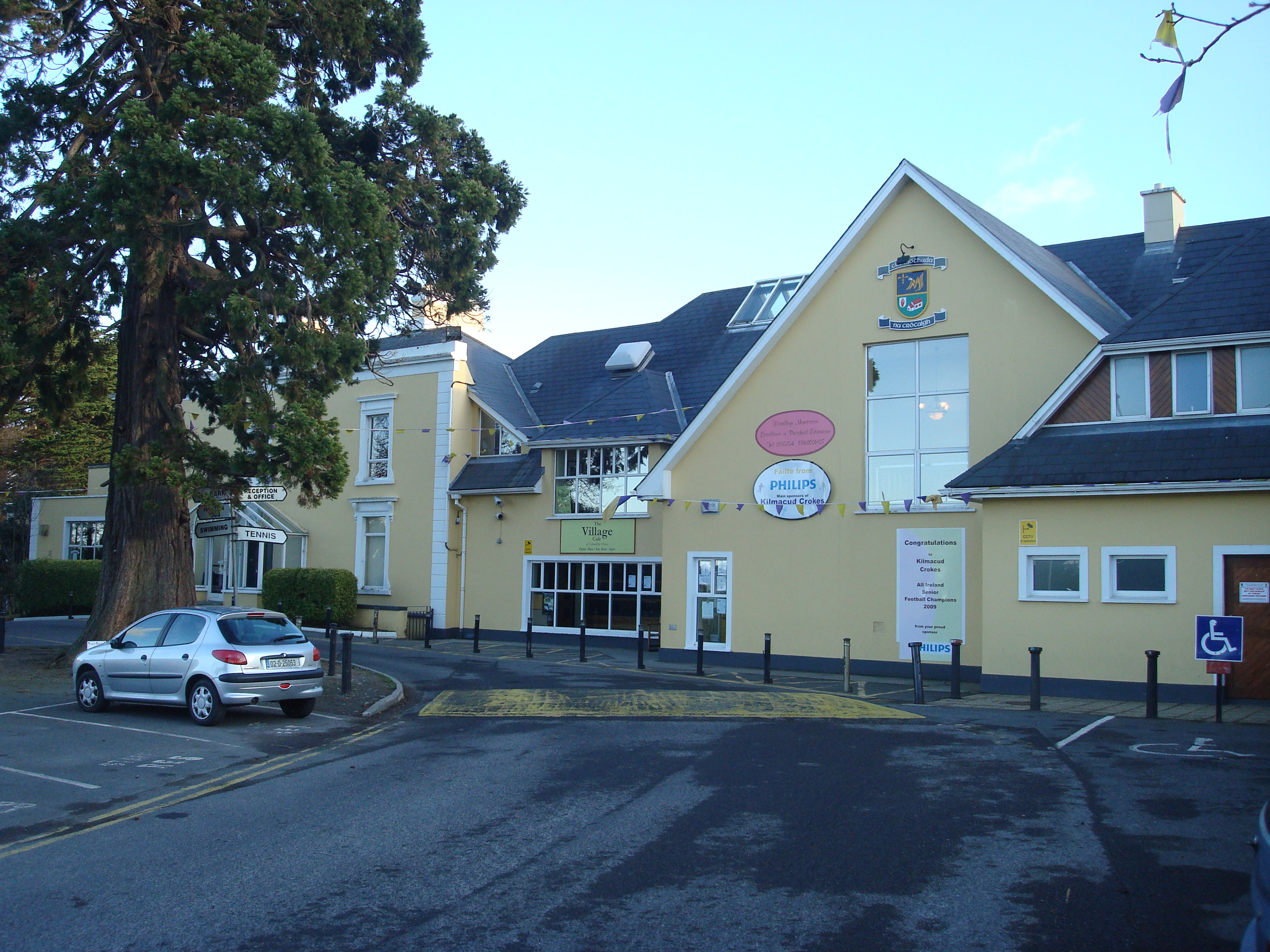
Kilmacud Crokes club house

Kilmacud GAA club was formed in 1959 following a public meeting in Saint Laurence's Hall, where Stillorgan shopping centre now stands. The first meeting of the club took place on 12 March 1959. Sixty people attended the meeting and donated a shilling each, meaning the club made IR£3.30 on the night. The club decided to use green-and-white jerseys, but they later decided to use the gold-and-purple colours, some say because of the local school Scoil Lorcain Naofa who also use gold and purple, others say it was because blue are the colours of the crocus.

In 1963 the club purchased a 6 1/2-acre site behind the Ormonde Cinema as a permanent home pitch for themselves, Páirc de Burca, and in 1965 the adjoining Glenalbyn House was bought. In April 1966, Crokes hurling club joined up with Kilmacud football club. The name of the joint football/hurling teams was changed from Kilmacud G.A.A. club to Kilmacud Crokes G.A.A. club in 1971. In 1972, St. Benburbs Football Club of Clonskeagh joined with Kilmacud Crokes. St. Benburbs FC was famous because the first-ever All-Ireland Final was played on their ground in Clonskeagh in 1887. In 1973, a camogie section of the club was set up and in February 1996 a Ladies' Gaelic football Section was set up.

The club has installed an astro-turf GAA pitch at the paddock, an area formerly used as a carpark/training ground, a venture which was finished in September 2006, and constructed indoor and outdoor hurling walls during 2007.

The current football Senior team is managed by Robbie Brennan and Johnny Magee. Anthony Daly is the current hurling coach.

== The Sevens ==
Kilmacud Crokes are also known for hosting the "Sevens" football and hurling competitions each year. Separate competitions are held on the weekends of the various All-Ireland Finals in September. For example, the Football competition is held on the Saturday before the All-Ireland Football final and the Hurling competition is held on the Saturday before the All-Ireland Hurling final. The Sevens were first played in 1973 and have since become an integral part of the All-Ireland weekends and feature on sports news programmes. Discussions and previews of the All-Ireland final on the following day are the subject of a lot of the media broadcasts.

The competitions run from the morning through to the evening. The games are played at various locations in and around Stillorgan including Glenalbyn, Deer Park, St Benildus College, St Olaf's and Silverpark. The finals are always played in Glenalbyn. The games are played with teams of seven players with two-halves of ten minutes each. Erin's Own of Cork and Castlewellan of Down were crowned Hurling and Football Sevens Champions for 2006 respectively. Longstone of Down won the 2007 football competition.

== Record ==
=== 1990s ===
Kilmacud Crokes won the All-Ireland Senior Club Football Championship final on St Patrick's Day, 1995 under the management of Tommy Lyons. Kilmacud Crokes, captained by Mick Dillon, beat Bellaghy of Derry with a scoreline of 0–8 to 0–5 in front of 18,544 fans at Croke Park. Mick Pender famously saved Damian Cassidy's (Bellaghy) penalty and won the title for Kilmacud. The game will be remembered as one of the coldest days club football final history.

Another county title followed in 1998. Crokes beat Na Fianna in the final. Wins over James Stephens, Kilkenny and Stradbally, Laois set up one of the most memorable Leinster club finals in recent years. Crokes played three games against Éire Óg, Carlow; they eventually lost however.

=== 2000s ===
Crokes won the Dublin championship in 2004. Crokes were nearly disqualified from the 2005 championship due to confusion over the eligibility of player Mark Vaughan. Crokes had defeated 2003 champions, St Brigid's, it was claimed that Mark Vaughan was ineligible for the tie. Crokes claimed that they had received prior approval that Vaughan could play from the Dublin county board, who said the Dublin Championships and The Leinster Championships were different competitions. The Leinster council overruled the Dublin county board. St Brigid's offered Crokes a replay under one condition, that Vaughan could not play. He scored six points in Crokes' original one-point victory over Brigid's. He had received the red card that caused the ban in the previous years defeat to Portlaoise. The DRA eventually awarded Crokes the match after agreeing that the two competitions were different. By this time Crokes' side of the draw was three games behind the other side of the draw. Kilmacud went on to win the 2005 Dublin Championship following a comprehensive 1–14 to 0–09 victory over Na Fianna and added to their success by winning the Leinster Championship following a 0–10 to 0–09 victory over Newbridge at Navan. Crokes were defeated in the All-Ireland semi-final by Salthill-Knocknacarra on a scoreline of 1–09 to 1–07. Mark Vaughan was shown a straight red card, having already been on a yellow, for striking a Salthill player. In 2006 and 2007, Crokes narrowly lost out in the semi-final stage of the Dublin championship. They lost to UCD and St Vincents, respectively. On 27 October 2008, Kilmacud won their sixth Dublin Senior Football Championship at Parnell Park. On 7 December 2008 Kilmacud won the Leinster Senior Football Championship for the third time, beating Rhode of Offaly by a scoreline of 2–07 to 1–07. They ensured their place in the All-Ireland final with a two-goal victory over Corofin of Galway on 21 February, and eventually defeated Crossmaglen Rangers of Armagh to win the final. Kilmacud also went on to win the Dublin Senior Championship with a victory over St Brigid's in 2010, before bowing out in the All-Ireland series to Crossmaglen Rangers at the semi-final stage.

=== 2020s ===
Kilmacud Crokes won the All-Ireland Senior Club Football Championship final in 2023 defeating Derry champions Glen 1–11 to 1-09. However the match caused significant controversy as Kilmacud had an extra player on the pitch during the last play of the game, breaching rule 2.1 of the GAA rulebook. The GAA ordered a replay of the final after Glen lodged an objection. However, after Kilmacud lodged an appeal against a replay, Glen withdrew from the appeals process, saying that they "do not believe the conditions exist for a replay", resulting in Kilmacud retaining their title.

In 2023, Kilmacud made history by winning 3 in-a-row Leinster titles beating Naas (KE) by a scoreline of 1–14 to 0–10. They are the first club to do achieve this in Leinster. They went on to narrowly lose to Glen in the semi-final with a scoreline of 2–10 to 1–14 in a weather affected match.

=== Youth ===
Kilmacud Crokes has won the All-Ireland Football Féile final three times, the first of these coming in 2003, the second in 2008 and the third in 2019. The hurlers added to the club's success with an All-Ireland Hurling Féile of their own in 2005. This hurling victory was the first time in the club's history that they had won the Dublin Hurling Féile and only the second time a Dublin Club had won the All-Ireland Féile. In 2014 the hurlers won Dublin and All-Ireland Hurling Féile titles.

In 2008 the U-14A hurling team again reached the All-Ireland Féile group stages, but after a tough match in the pouring rain they lost to James Stephens from Kilkenny. The U-14A footballers enjoyed more success and emerged victorious as All-Ireland Winners in Cavan in July. The ladies U-14 team also made it to their final also in Cavan, only to be beaten in the end by Naomh Michael.

Kilmacud Crokes won the Dublin Minor Hurling Championship final in 2007. They won the title for the third time in the club's history when they beat Na Fianna in a replay. The manager of the team was former Tipperary player, Richard Stakelum. A fourth title was added in 2009 when the Pat Halpin managed team that had won the All Ireland Feile in 2005 defeated St Vincents in the final. The club won their third Dublin Minor Hurling Championship in four years in November 2010 when a previously unfancied Crokes minor team capped an impressive championship run by beating favourites Ballyboden St. Endas in the final by 9 points.

=== Adult ===
==== Football ====
- All-Ireland Senior Club Football Championships: (3)
  - 1995, 2009, 2023
- Leinster Senior Club Football Championships: (7)
  - 1994, 2005, 2008, 2010, 2021, 2022, 2023
- Dublin Senior Football Championships: (11)
  - 1992, 1994, 1998, 2004, 2005, 2008, 2010, 2018, 2021, 2022, 2023
- Dublin Intermediate Football Championships: (2)
  - 1978, 1987
- Dublin Junior Football Championship (2)
  - 1986, 2016
- Dublin Junior D Football Championship: (2)
  - 2017, 2021
- Dublin Senior Football League (6)
  - 1994, 1997, 1998, 2002, 2008, 2017
- Dublin Senior Football League Division 2 (2)
  - 1980, 1988
- Dublin AFL Division 3 (2)
  - 2015, 2018
- Dublin AFL Division 8 (1)
  - 2018
- Dublin AFL Division 9 (1)
  - 2008

==== Hurling ====
- Dublin Senior Hurling Championships: (8)
  - 1966, 1974, 1976, 1985, 2012, 2014, 2021, 2022, 2026
- Dublin Senior B Hurling Championships: (2)
  - 2014
- Dublin Senior Hurling Leagues: (4)
  - 1996, 2011, 2024, 2025
- Dublin Intermediate Hurling Championships: (2)
  - 1963, 2011
- Dublin Junior Hurling Championships: (4)
  - 1935, 1936, 1992, 2002
- Dublin Junior B Hurling Championship (1)
  - 1998
- Dublin Junior C Hurling Championship (1)
  - 2016

==== Ladies' Football ====
- Leinster Ladies' Senior Club Football Championship (4)
  - 2022, 2023, 2024, 2025
- Dublin Ladies' Senior Football Championship (5)
  - 2022, 2023, 2024, 2025, 2026

==== Juvenile ====
- Dublin Minor A Hurling Championship 10
  - 1985, 1998, 2007, 2009, 2010, 2011, 2018, 2019, 2020, 2022
- Dublin Minor C Hurling Championship 1
  - 2006
- Dublin Under 21 Football Championship 5
  - 1983, 1988, 2002, 2015, 2016
- Dublin Minor A Football Championship 5
  - 1999, 2003, 2005, 2012, 2021
- Dublin Minor B Football Championship 1
  - 1992
- Dublin Minor C Football Championship 1
  - 2020
- Dublin Minor D Football Championship 1
  - 2014

== Notable players ==
- Mick Bermingham
- Pat Burke
- Paddy Carr
- Niall Corcoran
- Niall Corkery
- Ray Cosgrove
- Mark Davoren
- Deirdre Duke
- Paul Griffin
- Brian Kavanagh
- Tommy Lyons
- Darren Magee
- Johnny Magee
- Paul Mannion
- Seán McGrath
- Kevin Nolan
- Liam Óg Ó hÉineacháin
- Rory O'Carroll
- Ross O'Carroll
- Paddy O'Donoghue
- Ryan O'Dwyer
- Tomás Ó Flatharta
- Barry O'Rorke
- Cian O'Sullivan
- Richard Stakelum
- Mark Vaughan

== See also ==
- Des Newton (Gaelic footballer)

Preceded by Erin's Isle	Dublin Senior Champions; 1992	Succeeded by Ballyboden St Enda's

Preceded by Thomas Davis	Dublin Senior Champions; 1994	Succeeded by Ballyboden St Enda's

Preceded by Erin's Isle	Dublin Senior Champions; 1998	Succeeded by Na Fianna

Preceded by St Brigid's	Dublin Senior Champions; 2004–2005	Succeeded by UCD

Preceded by St Vincent's	Dublin Senior Champions; 2008	Succeeded by Ballyboden St Enda's
