= Mark Vaughan =

Irish Gaelic footballer

Personal information
- Native name: Marcas Mac Uachan (Irish)
- Born: 7 May 1985 (age 41) Dublin, Ireland
- Height: 1.8 m (5 ft 11 in)

Sport
- Sport: Gaelic football
- Position: Left corner forward
Club
- Years: Club
- Kilmacud Crokes
Club titles
- Dublin titles: 3
- Leinster titles: 2
- All-Ireland Titles: 1
Inter-county
- Years: County
- 2005–2008: Dublin
Inter-county titles
- Leinster titles: 3

Mark Vaughan (born 7 May 1985 in Dublin) is an Irish Gaelic footballer who plays for the Kilmacud Crokes division 10 junior B team and, formerly, for the Dublin county team. He made his break into the senior Dublin squad in 2005 making his first senior championship start on 19 June against Wexford. He scored two late frees in the Leinster Quarter-Final against Meath to ensure Dublin's win. Mark attended Griffith College Dublin and the Dublin Institute of Technology.

He attended Blackrock College where he excelled in sports including soccer and rugby. He played u-17 soccer for Ireland and had a trial for the U19 Rugby team and he also played rugby for Blackrock but he eventually decided to concentrate solely on Gaelic football. When at Blackrock College he guided them to an All-Ireland Schools soccer title in 2003. It was a game at Croke Park in 2003 that ignited his passion for Gaelic football. He was a star player for Crokes as they won the 2004 and 2005 Dublin Championships, 2005 Leinster Club Football Championships and reached the All-Ireland club semi-final against Salthill-Knocknacara of Galway, which they lost.

== National League appearances ==
#	Date	Venue	Opponent	Score	Result	Competition
1	5 March 2005	Austin Stack Park, Tralee	Kerry	0–2	2–11 : 2–13	National Football League Round 3
2	12 March 2005	Parnell Park, Dublin	Westmeath	–	0–11 : 0–7	National Football League Round 4
3	20 March 2005	Parnell Park, Dublin	Donegal	0–1	1–11 : 0–13	National Football League Round 5
4	26 March 2005	Páirc Uí Rinn, Cork	Cork	0–1	1–6 : 0–18	National Football League Round 6
5	4 March 2006	Parnell Park, Dublin	Offaly	–	1–10 : 3–2	National Football League Round 3
6	11 March 2006	Páirc Uí Rinn, Cork	Cork	–	1–10 : 1–11	National Football League Round 4
7	25 March 2006	Parnell Park, Dublin	Mayo	–	4–10 : 1–10	National Football League Round 6
8	9 April 2006	Fitzgerald Stadium, Killarney	Kerry	0–5	0–13 : 0–13	National Football League Round 7
9	24 March 2007	Parnell Park, Dublin	Fermanagh	0–1	3–15 : 0–7	National Football League Round 5
10	8 April 2007	Parnell Park, Dublin	Kerry	0–3	2–7 : 1–12	National Football League Round 7
11	2 February 2008	Parnell Park, Dublin	Westmeath	0–5	1–7 : 1–5	National Football League Round 1
12	1 March 2008	Kingspan Breffni Park, Cavan	Cavan	0–4	1–9 : 0–7	National Football League Round 3
13	23 March 2008	Parnell Park, Dublin	Monaghan	0–2	1–10 : 0–13	National Football League Round 4
14	13 April 2008	Crossmaglen, Armagh	Armagh	–	1–10 : 3–13	National Football League Round 5
15	20 April 2008	Parnell Park, Dublin	Meath	0–1	0–13 : 2–6	National Football League Round 7
16	26 April 2008	Páirc Tailteann, Navan	Westmeath	0–2	0–10 : 0–15	National Football League Division 2 Final

== Championship Appearances ==
#	Date	Venue	Opponent	Score	Result	Competition
1	15 May 2005	Croke Park, Dublin	Longford	0–2	2–23 : 0–10	2005 Leinster Championship Football Preliminary Quarter final
2	5 June 2005	Croke Park, Dublin	Meath	0–2	1–12 : 1–10	2005 Leinster Championship Football Quarter final
3	19 June 2005	Croke Park, Dublin	Wexford	–	1–17 : 2–10	2005 Leinster Championship Football Semi-final
4	27 August 2005	Croke Park, Dublin	Tyrone	–	1–14 : 2–18	2005 All Ireland Football Quarter final replay
5	4 June 2006	Pearse Park, Longford	Longford	1–0	1–12 : 0–13	2006 Leinster Championship Football Quarter final
6	25 June 2006	Croke Park, Dublin	Laois	–	3–17 : 0–12	2006 Leinster Championship Football Semi-final
7	13 August 2006	Croke Park, Dublin	Westmeath	–	1–12 : 0–5	2006 All Ireland Football Quarter final
8	27 August 2006	Croke Park, Dublin	Mayo	–	2–12 : 1–16	2006 All-Ireland Football Semi-final
9	17 June 2007	Croke Park, Dublin	Meath	0–8	0–16 : 0–12	2007 Leinster Championship Football Quarter final replay
10	24 June 2007	Croke Park, Dublin	Offaly	0–3	1–12 : 0–10	2007 Leinster Championship Football Semi-final
11	15 July 2007	Croke Park, Dublin	Laois	1–6	3–14 : 1–14	2007 Leinster Championship Football Final
12	11 August 2007	Croke Park, Dublin	Derry	0–6	0–18 : 0–15	2007 All Ireland Football Quarter final
13	26 August 2007	Croke Park, Dublin	Kerry	0–5	0–16 : 1–15	2007 All-Ireland Football Semi-final
14	8 June 2008	Croke Park, Dublin	Louth	0–1	1–22 : 0–12	2008 Leinster Championship Football Quarter final
15	29 June 2008	Croke Park, Dublin	Westmeath	–	0–13 : 1–8	2008 Leinster Championship Football Semi-final
16	20 July 2008	Croke Park, Dublin	Wexford	1–0	3–23 : 0–9	2008 Leinster Championship Football Final
17	16 August 2008	Croke Park, Dublin	Tyrone	–	1–8 : 3–14	2008 All Ireland Football Quarter final

== 2006 ==
Vaughan received a place on Dublin's starting panel for the first time this season in their 2006 league encounter with Mayo. He lined out at left corner forward.

Mark began Dublin's leinster championship defence on the starting 15 and scored 1–0 in the process against Longford. He was dropped for Dublins next match against Laois. He came on as a sub against Laois playing quite well and setting up a goal although he failed to make an appearance in the Leinster senior football championship final which Dublin won. Vaughan made a second-half substitute appearance against Westmeath in the All Ireland Quarter Final in Croke Park. Vaughan again made a second-half substitutes appearance against Mayo where he twice hit the upright while also missing a 45-metre kick which would have tied the game up for Dublin.

While attending a nightclub after the Mayo game Vaughan was in an argument and had his cheekbone broken. Despite this incident, Vaughan had publicly stated that he would be cheering on Mayo to collect the All-Ireland title.

== 2007 ==
Vaughan failed to make an appearance for Dublin in their opening match against neighbours Meath which finished as a draw. Vaughan was not announced on the original starting panel for the replay against Meath. Due to an injury to Darren Magee, Shane Ryan was moved from the half forward line to midfield and Vaughan was selected as the replacement. A decision was made by the Dublin management to select Vaughan as the freetaker in place of Tomás Quinn. Vaughan played outstandingly for Dublin in the game scoring eight points (five free kicks) to lead Dublin to a four-point victory over their old rivals, a performance which would lead to a man of the match award. Vaughan was selected in the centre forward position for the semi-final against Offaly to continue his role as freetaker. He finished the game on (0-1f, 0–1 `45') in a forgettable game against the faithful county which sent his team to the Leinster Senior Football Championship final. Mark increased his scoring tally by 1–06 when Dublin defeated Laois to win the 2007 Leinster championship. His rich vein of form continued against Derry sending Dublin into the semi-final while scoring 0–6, 0–3 f, 0–3 ‘45s.

== 2008 – 2009 ==
In 2008 Vaughan lost his free taking role with Dublin for the championship to former kicker Tomás Quinn. Vaughan came on as a substitute in the Leinster final and scored a goal in the victory over Wexford. Vaughan won a Dublin Senior Football Championship medal with Kilmacud Crokes in October 2008 at Parnell Park. 2009, proved a successful year at club level for Mark. Vaughan played a man of the match role as Kilmacud Crokes beat Corofin of Galway in the All-Ireland club semi-final in Mullingar. He chipped in with six points and a solo goal that involved beating three players. He then went on to win the All-Ireland Senior Club Football Championship with Crokes and scored a total of 0–4 (0-3f).

== Trivia ==
- His missed free against Mayo made him the second Kilmacud Crokes forward in a row to miss a free, against an upright, late on in an All-Ireland semi-final to draw up the game (the other being Ray Cosgrove -v- Armagh, 2002).
