= 1984 All-Ireland Senior Football Championship final =

- Event: 1984 All-Ireland Senior Football Championship
Dublin	Kerry
1–6 (9)	0–14 (14)
- Date: 23 September 1984
- Venue: Croke Park, Dublin
- Referee: Paddy Collins (Westmeath)
- Attendance: 68,365

The 1984 All-Ireland Senior Football Championship final was the 97th All-Ireland Final and the deciding match of the 1984 All-Ireland Senior Football Championship, an inter-county Gaelic football tournament for the top teams in Ireland.

This was one of six All-Ireland SFC finals contested by both Dublin and Kerry between 1974 and 1986, a period when one of either team always contested the decider.

== Pre-game ==
Dublin were considered hot favourites to defeat Kerry. Kerry had lost to Offaly on their last appearance at this stage in 1982 and had not made it past Cork in the 1983 final of the Munster Senior Football Championship.

== Match ==
This year's final was played on 23 September.

=== Summary ===
Tom Spillane and Ger Lynch — assigned to mark Tommy Conroy and Barney Rock — began their efforts during the national anthem, which they sang with aplomb. Spillane, quoted in the book Princes of Pigskin, said of this tactic later: "There was no belting but the plot was to sing the National Anthem as loud as we could into their ears to put the fear of God into them. Neither of us were great singers but they must have thought we were wired to the moon".

Kerry controlled the game and won by five points, only two Dublin forwards scoring. Dublin were well beaten (0–14 to 1–6). Kerry claimed great motivation for their victory came from a piece in the RTÉ Guide in which the team were referred to as "a cowardly blend of experienced players, has-beens and a few newcomers."

It was the third of five All-Ireland football titles won by Kerry in the 1980s.

=== Details ===
23 September 1984
Final

Dublin	1–6 – 0–14	Kerry
B Rock 1–5, T Conroy 0–1		J Kennedy 0–5, P Spillane 0–4, E Liston 0–3, J O'Shea 0–1, D Moran 0–1

Croke Park, Dublin
Attendance: 68,365
Referee: Paddy Collins (Westmeath)

Dublin
Kerry

==== Dublin ====
- 1 J. O'Leary
- 2 M. Holden
- 3 G. Hargan
- 4 M. Kennedy
- 5 P. Canavan
- 6 T. Drumm (c)
- 7 P.J. Buckley
- 8 J. Ronayne
- 9 B. Mullins
- 10 B. Rock
- 11 T. Conroy
- 12 K. Duff
- 13 J. Kearns
- 14 A. O'Toole
- 15 J. McNally

Subs used
M. O'Callaghan for J. McNally
C. Sutton for J. Tonayne

Manager
K. Heffernan

==== Kerry ====
- 1 C. Nelligan
- 2 P. Ó Sé
- 3 S. Walsh
- 4 M. Spillane
- 5 T. Doyle
- 6 T. Spillane
- 7 G. Lynch
- 8 J. O'Shea
- 9 A. O'Donovan (c)
- 10 John Kennedy
- 11 D. Moran
- 12 P. Spillane
- 13 G. Power
- 14 E. Liston
- 15 J. Egan

Sub used
18 T. O'Dowd for J. Egan

Subs not used
16 M. Sheehy
19 D. O'Donoghue
20 J. Higgins
21 D. Hartnett
22 G. O'Sullivan
23 W. O'Connor
24 V. O'Connor
25 T. Lynch
26 M. Keating

Manager
M. O'Dwyer
