= 1979 All-Ireland Senior Football Championship final =

- Event: 1979 All-Ireland Senior Football Championship
Kerry	Dublin
3–13 (22)	1–8 (11)
- Date: 16 September 1979
- Venue: Croke Park, Dublin
- Referee: Hugh Duggan (Armagh)
- Attendance: 72,185

The 1979 All-Ireland Senior Football Championship final was the 92nd All-Ireland Final and the deciding match of the 1979 All-Ireland Senior Football Championship, an inter-county Gaelic football tournament for the top teams in Ireland.

This was one of six All-Ireland SFC finals contested by both Dublin and Kerry between 1974 and 1986, a period when one of either team always contested the decider.

== Match ==
=== Summary ===
Kerry had Páidí Ó Sé sent off, but still won by 11 points.

It was the fourth of four All-Ireland football titles won by Kerry in the 1970s.

=== Details ===
16 September 1979; Final	Kerry	3–13 – 1–8	Dublin	Croke Park, Dublin; Attendance: 72,185; Referee: Hugh Duggan (Armagh)
16 September 1979; Final	M Sheehy 2–6, J Egan 1–1, P Spillane 0–4, E Liston 0–1, J O'Shea 0–1		J Ronayne 1–0, B Doyle 0–3, T Hanahoe 0–2, D Hickey 0–2, A O'Toole 0–1	Croke Park, Dublin; Attendance: 72,185; Referee: Hugh Duggan (Armagh)

Kerry

Dublin

==== Kerry ====
- 1 C. Nelligan
- 2 J. Deenihan
- 3 J. O'Keeffe
- 4 M. Spillane
- 5 P. Ó Sé
- 6 T. Kennelly (c)
- 7 P. Lynch
- 8 J. O'Shea
- 9 S. Walsh
- 10 T. Doyle
- 11 D. Moran
- 12 P. Spillane
- 13 M. Sheehy
- 14 E. Liston
- 15 J. Egan

Sub used
16 V. O'Connor

Sub used
17 G. Power
18 G. O'Keeffe
19 B. Walsh
20 J. L. McElligott
21 P. O'Mahony
22 G. O'Driscoll
23 T. O'Regan

Manager
M. O'Dwyer

==== Dublin ====
- 1 P. Cullen
- 2 M. Kennedy
- 3 M. Holden
- 4 D. Foran
- 5 T. Drumm
- 6 F. Ryder
- 7 P. O'Neill
- 8 B. Mullins
- 9 B. Brogan
- 10 A. O'Toole
- 11 T. Hanahoe (c)
- 12 D. Hickey
- 13 M. Hickey
- 14 B. Doyle
- 15 J. McCarthy

Subs used
17 J. Ronayne for M. Hickey
19 G. O'Driscoll for J. McCarthy
21 B. Pocock for A. O'Toole

Subs not used
16 S. Doherty
18 R. Kelleher
20 P. Reilly
22 P. Ellis
23 J. Brogan
24 A. Larkin
25 J. Caffrey
26 P. Canavan
27 P. Norton
28 S. Bannon
29 S. Kearns

Manager
K. Heffernan
