= Tom Spillane Snr =

Kerry Gaelic footballer

Tom Spillane
Personal information
- Native name: Tomás Ó Spealáin (Irish)
- Born: 1923 Cork, Ireland
- Died: 1 October 1964 (aged 41) Templenoe, County Kerry, Ireland
- Occupation: Publican

Sport
- Sport: Gaelic football
- Position: Midfield
Clubs
- Years: Club
- Killarney Legion; Templenoe; Kenmare
Club titles
- Kerry titles: 1
Inter-county
Years	County	Apps (scores)
1948–1955	Kerry	5 (0–1)
Inter-county titles
- Munster titles: 1
- All-Irelands: 0
- NFL: 0

Thomas Francis Spillane (1923 – 1 October 1964) was an Irish Gaelic footballer and selector. At club level he played with Killarney Legion, Templenoe and Kenmare and was also a member of the Kerry senior football team.

== Career ==
Spillane first played Gaelic football as a students at St Brendan's College in Killarney where he enjoyed Dunloe Cup and Bishop O'Sullivan Cup successes. At club level he was part of the Killarney Legion team that won the Kerry SFC title in 1946. Spillane later joined the Templenoe club and was also a member of the Kenmare district team that lost the 1952 and 1954 finals.

Spillane first appeared on the inter-county scene as a member of the Kerry minor football team that won consecutive Munster MFC titles in 1940 and 1941. A period with the junior team followed before making his senior team debut in 1948. Spillane won a Munster SFC medal that season, however, his appearances for the team were sporadic over the next few years. In spite of this he earned a call-up to the Munster team and won consecutive Railway Cup medals in 1948 and 1949. Spillane won an All-Ireland JFC medal with the Kerry junior team in 1954, however, his inter-county career ended after a brief return to the senior team in 1955.

In retirement from playing Spillane served as a selector, and was part of the selection committee when the Kerry senior team was beaten by Galway in the 1964 All-Ireland SFC final.

== Personal life and death ==
Spillane married Maura Lyne, a sister of Mikey, Jackie and Dinny Lyne who all played with Kerry. His sons, Pat, Mick and Tom Jnr, all played with Kerry and won a combined total of 19 All-Ireland SFC medals between 1975 and 1986. His grandsons, Adrian and Killian Spillane, played on the Kerry All-Ireland-winning team in 2022, and again Killian played in the 2025 win over Donegal bringing the family medal haul to 22.

Tom Spillane died from a heart attack on 1 October 1964, aged 41. Days earlier he had been a selector on the sideline for Kerry's All-Ireland final defeat by Galway.

== Honours ==
=== Player ===
St Brendan's College

- Bishop O'Sullivan Cup: 1940, 1941

Killarney Legion

- Kerry Senior Football Championship: 1946

Kerry

- Munster Senior Football Championship: 1948
- All-Ireland Junior Football Championship: 1954
- Munster Junior Football Championship: 1947, 1954
- Munster Minor Football Championship: 1940, 1941

Munster

- Railway Cup: 1948, 1949

=== Selector ===
Kerry

- Munster Senior Football Championship: 1964
