= 2023 Kerry Senior Football Championship =

Gaelic football tournament season

2023 Kerry SFC
Tournament details
- County: Kerry
- Year: 2023
- Trophy: Bishop Moynihan Cup
- Sponsor: Garvey's Supervalu
- Date: 15 September – 5 November
- Teams: 16
- Defending champions: East Kerry

Winners
- Champions: East Kerry (11th win)
- Manager: Jerry O'Sullivan
- Captain: Paudie Clifford

Runners-up
- Runners-up: Mid Kerry
- Manager: Peter O'Sullivan
- Captain: Mike Breen

Promotion/Relegation
- Promoted team(s): Milltown/Castlemaine
- Relegated team(s): Kerins O'Rahilly's

Other
- Matches played: 31
- Total scored: 56–727 (895)
- Top Scorer: Dara Roche (East Kerry) 2–24 (30)
- Website: https://www.kerrygaa.ie/garvey/

The 2023 Kerry Senior Football Championship was the 122nd edition of Kerry GAA's premier tournament for senior Gaelic football teams in County Kerry, Ireland. The tournament consisted of 16 teams (8 senior club teams and 8 divisional teams). The Championship was won by East Kerry who retained their title. As they are a divisional team, the winners of the 2023 Kerry Club Football Championship (Dingle) represented Kerry in the 2023 Munster Senior Club Football Championship.

== Format ==
The format for the 2023 Championship was the same as that used in 2022 beginning with a mini-league phase followed by a single-elimination phase. The eight senior club teams and eight divisional teams (16 in total) were divided into four groups of four teams each, playing a single round-robin format. Teams were awarded 2 points for a win, 1 for a draw and none for a loss. The top two teams in each group advanced to the quarter-finals.

== Teams ==
=== Team changes ===
Rathmore were promoted to the Kerry SFC for 2023 having won the 2022 Kerry Intermediate Football Championship. They replaced Austin Stacks who in turn were relegated to the Intermediate Championship for 2023 having lost the 2022 Kerry Club Football Championship Relegation play-off to Kenmare Shamrocks.

=== 2023 Teams ===
Team	Location	Club/Divisional	Club's Divisional Side	Championship Titles	Last Championship Title
Dingle	Dingle	Club	West Kerry	6	1948
Dr Crokes	Killarney	Club	East Kerry	13	2018
East Kerry	East Kerry	Division	—	10	2022
Feale Rangers	North Kerry	Division	—	3	2007
Kenmare Shamrocks	Kenmare	Club	Kenmare District	0	—
Kerins O'Rahilly's	Tralee	Club	St Brendan's	6	2002
Mid Kerry	Mid Kerry	Division	—	4	2008
Na Gaeil	Tralee	Club	St Brendan's	0	—
Rathmore	Rathmore	Club	East Kerry	0	—
Shannon Rangers	North Kerry	Division	—	5	1977
South Kerry	South Kerry	Division	—	10	2015
Spa	Killarney	Club	East Kerry	0	—
St Brendan's	Tralee	Division	—	0	—
St Kieran's	Castleisland	Division	—	1	1988
Templenoe	Templenoe	Club	Kenmare District	0	—
West Kerry	West Kerry	Division	—	3	1990

== Group stage ==
=== Group 1 ===
Pos	Team	Pld	W	D	L	PF	PA	PD	Pts	
1	East Kerry	3	3	0	0	55	35	+20	6	Advanced to Quarter-finals
2	Templenoe	3	2	0	1	41	43	-2	4	Advanced to Quarter-finals
3	South Kerry	3	1	0	2	23	32	-9	2	
4	West Kerry	3	0	0	3	27	36	-9	0	

Round 1

16 September 2023 Round 1	Templenoe	2–13 (19) – (18) 0–18	West Kerry	Fitzgerald Stadium
15:00 IST (UTC+1)		(HT: 2–05 – 0–08)
	Gls: S O'Sullivan, A Crowley 1 each. Pts: K Spillane 8 (5fs), G Crowley, T Morley, S Sheahan, S O'Sullivan, P Clifford 1 each	Report	Pts: D O'Shea 7 (3fs), C Ferriter 3, R Ó Sé, K Falvey, C Ó Beaglaoich 2 each, J Crean, T O'Donnell 1 each	Referee: B O'Shea (Keel)

16 September 2023 Round 1	East Kerry	3–13 (22) – (14) 1–11	South Kerry	Austin Stack Park
19:30 IST (UTC+1)		(HT: 1–07 – 1–03)
	Gls: E O'Shea 2, D Roche 1 Pts: D Roche 5 (2fs), D O'Sullivan, P D'Arcy, E O'Shea 2 each, C Gammell, L Crowley 1 each	Report	Gls: E Daly 1 Pts: E Daly 5 (1f), I O'Sullivan 3 (2fs), K Brennan 2 (1f), A Murphy 1 (1'45)	Referee: P Hayes (Kerins O'Rahilly's)

Round 2

24 September 2023 Round 2	West Kerry	0–09 (9) – (17) 0–17	East Kerry	Lispole
13:30 IST (UTC+1)		(HT: 0–05 – 0–07)
	Pts: D Ó Sé 5 (4fs), K Falvey, J Crean, C Ó Beaglaoich, C Ferriter 1 each	Report	Pts: D Roche 6 (5fs), P D'Arcy, E O'Shea 3 each, C Gammell, D O'Brien, M Rennie, L Crowley, F Murphy 1 each	Referee: É Moran (Ballydonoghue)

24 September 2023 Round 2	Templenoe	0–10 (10) – (9) 1–06	South Kerry	Templenoe
15:00 IST (UTC+1)		(HT: 0–06 – 1–03)
	Pts: K Spillane 5 (4fs), C Crowley 3, B Crowley, A Crowley 1 each	Report	Gls: F Clifford 1 Pts: F O'Sullivan, J Clifford 2 each, I O'Sullivan 1, K Brennan 1f	Referee: E Sheehy (Rathmore)

Round 3

30 September 2023 Round 3	South Kerry	w/o v	West Kerry	Cahersiveen
15:00 IST (UTC+1)

1 October 2023 Round 3	East Kerry	1–13 (16) – (12) 0–12	Templenoe	Fitzgerald Stadium
13:30 IST (UTC+1)		(HT: 0–07 – 0–06)
	Gls: P D'Arcy 1 Pts: D Roche 4 (3fs), J Sherwood, R Buckley, E O'Shea 2 each, M Rennie, P D'Arcy, D O'Sullivan 1 each	Report	Pts: K Spillane 4 (3fs), P Clifford 2, T Morley, S O'Sullivan, C Crowley, A Crowley 1 each	Referee: P Curran (Brosna)

=== Group 2 ===
Pos	Team	Pld	W	D	L	PF	PA	PD	Pts	
1	Rathmore	3	2	1	0	54	40	+14	5	Advanced to Quarter-finals
2	St Kieran's	3	1	2	0	59	46	+13	4	Advanced to Quarter-finals
3	Kenmare Shamrocks	3	1	1	1	38	37	+1	3	
4	Feale Rangers	3	0	0	3	30	58	-28	0	

Round 1

17 September 2023 Round 1	Rathmore	0–20 (20) – (20) 2–14	St Kieran's	Fitzgerald Stadium
13:30 IST (UTC+1)		(HT: 2–04 – 0–10)
	Pts: S Ryan 7 (1mk, 1'45, 1f), C Spiers 3 (3fs), J Darmody 3, M Ryan, C Ryan, C Collins 2 each, B Friel 1.	Report	Gls: C Brosnan, A Barry 1 each. Pts: P Walsh 4 (2fs), D Keane 3, S Ó Ó Ciardubhán 2 (2fs), A Barry 2 (1f), M Reidy, A Donoghue, V Horan 1 each	Referee: E Moriarty (Dingle)

17 September 2023 Round 1	Feale Rangers	0–09 (9) – (13) 0–13	Kenmare Shamrocks	Fitzgerald Stadium
15:30 IST (UTC+1)		(HT: 0–05 – 0–04)
	Pts: C Dillon 4 (3fs), E Healy, R Mahony, J J Grimes, S Stack, D Keane 1 each	Report	Pts: S O'Shea 7 (4 fs, 1mk), J Lehane, K O'Sullivan 2 each, D Ciuciu, D Allman 1 each	Referee: S Joy (Laune Rangers)

Round 2

23 September 2023 Round 2	Rathmore	1–16 (19) – (8) 1–05	Feale Rangers	Rathmore
14:30 IST (UTC+1)		(HT: 1–05 – 0–04)
	Gls: J Moynihan 1 Pts: S Ryan 4, J Darmody 2 (1mk), P Murphy, M Ryan, F Murphy 2 each, A Dineen, J Moynihan, C Collins, J Mahony 1 each	Report	Gls: B Mahony 1 Pts: C Dillon 3 (3fs), J J Grimes, D Keane 1 each	Referee: B O'Shea (Keel)

23 September 2023 Round 2	St Kieran's	0–13 (13) – (13) 1–10	Kenmare Shamrocks	Cordal
17:30 IST (UTC+1)		(HT: 0–08 – 1–08)
	Pts: P Walsh 6 (4fs), A Barry 4 (1f), E Horan 2, N Collins 1	Report	Gls: D Hallissey 1 Pts: S O'Shea (2fs, 2'45), J Lehane 2, D O'Connor, S O'Brien, D Allman 1 each	Referee: B Brosnan (Glenflesk)

Round 3

1 October 2023 Round 3	Kenmare Shamrocks	0–12 (12) – (15) 1–12	Rathmore	Kenmare
16:00 IST (UTC+1)		(HT: 0–05 – 1–05)
	Pts: S O'Shea 10 (6fs, 2mks), J McCarthy, K O'Sullivan 1 each	Report	Gls: J Moynihan 1 Pts: S Ryan 4 (3fs), C Ryan 2, A Dineen, B Friel, M Ryan, J Darmody, J Moynihan, D Murphy 1 each	Referee: B Griffin (Clounmacon)

1 October 2023 Round 3	Feale Rangers	0–13 (13) – (26) 4–14	St Kieran's	Listowel
16:00 IST (UTC+1)		(HT: 0–03 – 3–05)
	Pts: C Dillon 7 (5fs), D Lynch 3, T Moloney 2, S Stack 1	Report	Gls: P Walsh 2 (1f), E Horan, N Collins 1 each Pts: P Walsh 5(2fs), A Barry 4(2fs), S Ó Ó Ciardubháin 2(2'45), N Collins 2, E Horan 1	Referee: E Moriarty (Dingle)

=== Group 3 ===
Pos	Team	Pld	W	D	L	PF	PA	PD	Pts	
1	Mid Kerry	3	3	0	0	51	38	+13	6	Advanced to Quarter-finals
2	Spa	3	2	0	1	56	45	+11	4	Advanced to Quarter-finals
3	Kerins O'Rahilly's	3	1	0	2	46	44	+2	2	
4	Shannon Rangers	3	0	0	3	46	72	-26	0	

Round 1

16 September 2023 Round 1	Kerins O'Rahilly's	1–21 (24) – (19) 1–16	Shannon Rangers	Austin Stack Park
17:30 IST (UTC+1)		(HT: 1–09 – 0–08)
	Gls: T Hoare 1 Pts: T Hoare 7 (4fs), D Moran 3 (1f), G Savage 3, B Hanafin, T Walsh 2 each, B J Keane 1 (1f), D O'Connor, C Hayes, D O'Sullivan 1 each.	Report	Gls: K Goulding 1 Pts: J Kennelly 5 (2fs), M Boyle 3 (2fs), C Langan, K Goulding 2 each, M Foley, A Segal, R Stack, C O'Connor	Referee: D Clifford (Laune Rangers)

17 September 2023 Round 1	Mid Kerry	3–11 (20) – (14) 0–14	Spa	Austin Stack Park
16:15 IST (UTC+1)		(HT: 1–05 – 0–06)
	Gls: D Cleary, C Burke, C Teahan 1 each Pts: E O'Connor 3 (2fs), D Houlihan, F Clifford 2 each, J O'Connor 1 (1f), K Evans, S O'Brien, L Carey 1 each	Report	Pts: E Cronin 5 (4fs), C Murphy 2 (1f), D O'Donoghue 2, G Vaughan, T Moynihan, M O'Donoghue 1 each	Referee: J M Fitzgerald (Abbeydorney)

Round 2

24 September 2023 Round 2	Shannon Rangers	1–10 (13) – (19) 4–07	Mid Kerry	Asdee
14:00 IST (UTC+1)		(HT: 0–04 – 1–04)
	Gls: J O'Sullivan 1 Pts: C Langan 3 (1f), K Goulding 2, J Foley, M Foley, P Boyle, J Kennelly, J O'Sullivan 1 each	Report	Gls: G O'Grady 1 (1p), K Evans, G Horan, L Carey 1 each Pts: D Cleary 2, J O'Connor 1 (1f), D Houlihan, G Grady, G Hassett, L Carey 1 each	Referee: P O'Sullivan (Firies)

24 September 2023 Round 2	Kerins O'Rahilly's	0–11 (11) – (13) 1–10	Spa	Strand Road
16:00 IST (UTC+1)		(HT: 0–06 – 0–06)
	Pts: T Hoare 5 (4fs), C Hayes 2 (1mk), D Moran, B J Keane, D O'Connor, T Walsh 1 each	Report	Gls: C Murphy 1 Pts: D O'Donoghue 3, E Cronin 2 (1f), M O'Donoghue 2, C Murphy 1 (1f), L Spillane, D Moynihan 1 each	Referee: B Griffin (Clounmacon)

Round 3

30 September 2023 Round 3	Mid Kerry	1–09 (12) – (11) 0–11	Kerins O'Rahilly's	Beaufort
17:00 IST (UTC+1)		(HT: 1–04 – 0–04)
	Gls: D Cleary 1 Pts: E O'Connor 4 (2fs, 1'45), K Evans 2, D Roche, F Clifford, G O'Grady 1 each	Report	Pts: J Savage 7 (4fs, 1mk, 1'45), T Walsh 2 (1mk), T Hoare 1 (1f), G Savage 1	Referee: S Mulvihill (St Senan's)

30 September 2023 Round 3	Spa	4–17 (29) – (14) 1–11	Shannon Rangers	Tullig
17:00 IST (UTC+1)		(HT: 2–06 – 1–04)
	Gls: C Murphy 3, E Cronin 1 Pts: C Murphy 5, D O'Donoghue 3, D Moynihan 2, E Cronin 1 (1f), E Fitzgerald, M McCarthy, G Vaughan, T Moynihan, M O'Donoghue, C Spillane 1 each	Report	Gls: P Boyle 1 Pts: J Kennelly 3 (1f), C Langan 2 (1f), R Stack 2, K Goulding, M Boyle, M Slattery, D Keane 1 each	Referee: J Griffin (Glenbeigh/Glencar)

=== Group 4 ===
Pos	Team	Pld	W	D	L	PF	PA	PD	Pts	
1	Dingle	3	3	0	0	42	27	+15	6	Advanced to Quarter-finals
2	Na Gaeil	3	2	0	1	38	27	+11	4	Advanced to Quarter-finals
3	Dr Crokes	3	1	0	2	45	37	+8	2	
4	St Brendan's	3	0	0	3	21	55	-34	0	

Round 1

15 September 2023 Round 1	Na Gaeil	3–11 (20) – (5) 0–05	St Brendan's	Austin Stack Park
20:00 IST (UTC+1)		(HT: 0–07 – 0–02)
	Gls: D Bourke, J Bourke, K O'Connor 1 each Pts: J Sheehan 3, D Devine 2, D Burns, D Reen, J Doyle, D Bourke, D O'Connor, K O'Connor 1 each	Report	Pts: S Quilter 3 (3fs), A O'Donoghue 1 (1f), J Linehan 1	Referee: P Curtin (Brosna)

17 September 2023 Round 1	Dingle	1–13 (16) – (14) 0–14	Dr Crokes	Austin Stack Park
14:15 IST (UTC+1)		(HT: 0–08 – 0–07)
	Gls: C Geaney 1 Pts: C Geaney 8 (2mks, 2fs), P Geaney 2 (2fs), D Geaney 2 (1mk), C Bambury 1	Report	Pts: T Brosnan 5 (2fs), M Burns 2 (1f), M O'Shea, T Doyle 2 each, D Courtney, B Looney, C McMahon 1 each	Referee: S Mulvihill (St Senan's)

Round 2

23 September 2023 Round 2	Na Gaeil	0–10 (10) – (9) 0–09	Dr Crokes	Killeen
14:30 IST (UTC+1)		(HT: 0–06 – 0–05)
	Pts: D O'Connor, T Ó hAiniféin, J Sheehan 2 each, D Burns 1 (1f), D Devine 1 (1f), D Reen 1 (1mk), J O'Connor 1	Report	Pts: T Brosnan 3 (2fs), C Moynihan 2, M O'Shea, M Burns, G O'Shea, K O'Leary 1 each	Referee: J Griffin (Glenbeigh/Glencar)

23 September 2023 Round 2	St Brendan's	0–05 (5) – (13) 1–10	Dingle	Ardfert
17:30 IST (UTC+1)		(HT: 0–02 – 0–07)
	Pts: Ó Ferris 2 (1f), W Guthrie 1 (1f), R Monahan, S Quilter 1 each	Report	Gls: M Geaney 1 (1p); Pts: C Geaney 5 (4fs), D Geaney 3 (1f), N Geaney, M Geaney 1 each	Referee: D Casey (Scartaglin)

Round 3

30 September 2023 Round 3	Dr Crokes	1–19 (22) – (11) 0–11	St Brendan's	Lewis Road
14:00 IST (UTC+1)		(HT: 0–09 – 0–05)
	Gls: B Looney 1 Pts: M Casey 4, T Brosnan 3 (1f), M Potts, B Looney, D Shaw, C McMahon 2 each, S Murphy 1 (1'45), M Fitzgerald, M Burns, G O'Shea 1 each	Report	Pts: S Quilter 4 (2fs), A O'Donoghue 2 (2fs), E McElligott 2, A Heinrich, N Driscoll, L Dowling 1 each	Referee: G Kissane (Kerins O'Rahilly's)

30 September 2023 Round 3	Dingle	0–13 (13) – (8) 0–08	Na Gaeil	Dingle
16:30 IST (UTC+1)		(HT: 0–04 – 0–04)
	Pts: P Geaney 6 (5fs), T O'Sullivan 3, G Curran 1 (1f), D Geaney, C Geaney, C Bambury 1 each	Report	Pts: D O'Connor 4 (3fs), D Burns 1 (1f), D Devine 1 (1f), T Ó hAiniféin, D Reen 1 each	Referee: E Walsh (Rathmore)

== Knockout stage ==
=== Bracket ===
Quarter-finals; 14/15 October
Rathmore	0–14
Spa	1–08
East Kerry	4–19
St Kieran’s	0–12
Dingle	0–20
Templenoe	1–09
Mid Kerry	1–19
Na Gaeil	1–07

Semi-finals; 21/22 October
Rathmore	1–10
East Kerry	1–16
Dingle	0–09
Mid Kerry	3–10

Final; 5 November
East Kerry	2–10
Mid Kerry	0–15

=== Quarter-finals ===
14 October 2023
14:30 IST (UTC+1)
Quarter-final 1

Report

Rathmore	0–14 (14) – (11) 1–08	Spa
(HT: 0–09 – 0–05)
Pts: S Ryan 5(2fs, 1mk), J Moynihan 4, B Friel, P Murphy, M Ryan, C Ryan, J Darmody 1 each		Gls: C Spillane 1 Pts: C Murphy 3(2fs), M McCarthy, E Cronin 2 each, D Moynihan 1

Fitzgerald Stadium
Referee: S Joy (Laune Rangers)

14 October 2023
16:30 IST (UTC+1)
Quarter-final 2

Report

East Kerry	4–19 (31) – (12) 0–12	St Kieran's
(HT: 1–07 – 0–04)
Gls: P D'Arcy, D Clifford, D Roche, E O'Shea 1 each Pts: D Clifford 5 (3fs), D Roche 5 (2fs), P Clifford 3 (1'45), D O'Sullivan 3, K Murphy, R Buckley, E O'Shea 1 each		Pts: A Barry 3 (3fs), M Hickey 3, P Walsh 2 (1f), A O'Donoghue 1 (1f), S Horan, E Horan, T Hickey 1 each

Austin Stack Park
Referee: J Griffin (Glenbeigh/Glencar)

15 October 2023
13:30 IST (UTC+1)
Quarter-final 3

Report

Dingle	0–20 (20) – (12) 1–09	Templenoe
(HT: 0–07 – 0–05)
Pts: C Geaney 5 (1f, 1mk), P Geaney 5 (2fs, 2mks), D Geaney, C Bambury 3 each, N Geaney, T O'Sullivan, B O'Connor, M Flaherty 1 each		Gls: S O'Sullivan 1 Pts: K Spillane 5 (2fs, 1mk), A Crowley 2 (1f), D Crowley, C Crowley 1 each

Fitzgerald Stadium
Referee: S Mulvihill (St Senan's)

15 October 2023
15:30 IST (UTC+1)
Quarter-final 4

Report

Mid Kerry	1–19 (22) – (10) 1–07	Na Gaeil
(HT: 1–10 – 1–05)
Gls: É O'Connor 1 Pts: É O'Connor 5 (2fs), S O'Brien, G Horan, F Clifford 3 each, G O'Grady 1 (1f), D Roche, D Houlihan, L Carey, D Cleary 1 each		Gls: M Madden 1 Pts: D Reen 2, D Burns 1 (1f), D Devine 1 (1f), J Barry, J Sheehan, D Goggin 1 each

Fitzgerald Stadium
Referee: P O'Sullivan (Firies)

=== Semi-finals ===
21 October 2023
17:30 IST (UTC+1)
Semi-final 1

Report

Dingle	0–09 (9) – (19) 3–10	Mid Kerry
(HT: 0–07 – 1–06)
Pts: C Geaney 4 (2fs, 1mk), P Geaney 3 (1f, 2mks), N Geaney 1 (1mk), D Geaney 1 (1mk)		Gls: C Burke, D Cleary, J O'Connor 1 each Pts: É O'Connor 3 (2fs), G O'Grady 2 (1f), D Cleary 2, S O'Brien, D Houlihan 1 each

Austin Stack Park
Referee: B Evans (Clounmacon)

22 October 2023
14:30 IST (UTC+1)
Semi-final 2

Report

Rathmore	1–10 (13) – (19) 1–16	East Kerry
(HT: 0–04 – 1–04)
Gls: B O'Keeffe 1 Pts: S Ryan 6 (4fs, 1mk), M Ryan, B O'Keeffe, J Darmody, M Reen 1 each		Gls: D Clifford 1 Pts: P Clifford 4, D Roche 4 (1f), D Clifford 3 (1f), D O'Sullivan 1 (1mk), K Murphy, R Buckley, P D'Arcy, 1 each

Fitzgerald Stadium
Referee: P Hayes (Kerins O'Rahilly's)

=== Final ===
TG4

5 November 2023
15:30 WET (UTC)
Final

Report

East Kerry	2–10 (16) – (15) 0–15	Mid Kerry
(HT: 1–06 – 0–05)
Gls: P Clifford, L Crowley 1 each Pts: D Roche 5 (3fs), D Clifford 3 (2fs), D O'Sullivan 2		Pts: É O'Connor 6 (6fs), F Clifford 2 (1f), G O'Grady 2, M Breen, S O'Brien, G Horan, C Burke, L Carey 1 each

Austin Stack Park, Tralee
Referee: Paul Hayes (Kerins O'Rahilly's)
Standby: Séamus Mulvihill (St Senan's)
Linesman: Brendan Griffin (Clounmacon)

== Championship statistics ==
=== Miscellaneous ===
- Kerins O'Rahilly's are relegated for the first time in their history.

== See also ==
- 2023 Kerry Club Football Championship
