= 1986 All-Ireland Senior Football Championship final =

- Event: 1986 All-Ireland Senior Football Championship
Kerry	Tyrone
2–15 (21)	1–10 (13)
- Date: 21 September 1986
- Venue: Croke Park, Dublin
- Man of the Match: Pat Spillane
- Referee: Jimmy Dennigan (Cork)
- Attendance: 68,628

The 1986 All-Ireland Senior Football Championship final was the 99th All-Ireland Final and the deciding match of the 1986 All-Ireland Senior Football Championship, an inter-county Gaelic football tournament for the top teams in Ireland.

This was one of the 13 consecutive All-Ireland SFC finals contested by either Dublin or Kerry between 1974 and 1986, a period when one of either team always contested the decider.

== Match ==
=== Summary ===
Tyrone were seven points clear at one point, but went on to lose by eight, Pat Spillane and Mikey Sheehy scoring goals.

This was the fifth of five All-Ireland SFC titles won by Kerry in the 1980s. Kerry did not win another All-Ireland football title until 1997.

It was also the first championship meeting of Kerry and Tyrone.

=== Details ===
21 September 1986
Final

Kerry	2–15 – 1–10	Tyrone
P Spillane 1–4, M Sheehy 1–4, E Liston 0–2, D Moran 0–2, T O'Dowd 0–2, G Power 0–1		P Quinn 1–1, M Mallon 0–4, S McNally 0–2, M McClure 0–1, K McCabe 0–1, D O'Hagan 0–1

Croke Park, Dublin
Attendance: 65,628
Referee: Jimmy Dennigan (Cork)

Kerry
Tyrone

==== Kerry ====
- 1 C. Nelligan
- 2 P. Ó Sé
- 3 S. Walsh
- 4 M. Spillane
- 5 T. Doyle (c)
- 6 T. Spillane
- 7 G. Lynch
- 8 J. O'Shea
- 9 A. O'Donovan
- 10 W. Maher
- 11 D. Moran
- 12 P. Spillane
- 13 M. Sheehy
- 14 E. Liston
- 15 G. Power

Sub used
17 T. O'Dowd for A. O'Donovan

Subs not used
16 J. Kennedy
18 J. Higgins
19 M. Galwey
20 S. Stack
21 D. Hanafin

Manager
M. O'Dwyer

==== Tyrone ====
- 1 A. Skelton
- 2 J. Mallon
- 3 C. McGarvey
- 4 J. Lynch
- 5 K. McCabe
- 6 N. McGinn
- 7 P. Ball
- 8 P. Donaghy
- 9 H. McClure
- 10 M. McClure
- 11 E. McKenna (c)
- 12 S. McNally
- 13 P. Quinn
- 14 D. O'Hagan
- 15 M. Mallon

Subs
S. Conway for ?
S. Rice for ?
A. O'Hagan for ?

Manager
A. McRory
