= 2025 All-Ireland Senior Football Championship final =

Gaelic football match

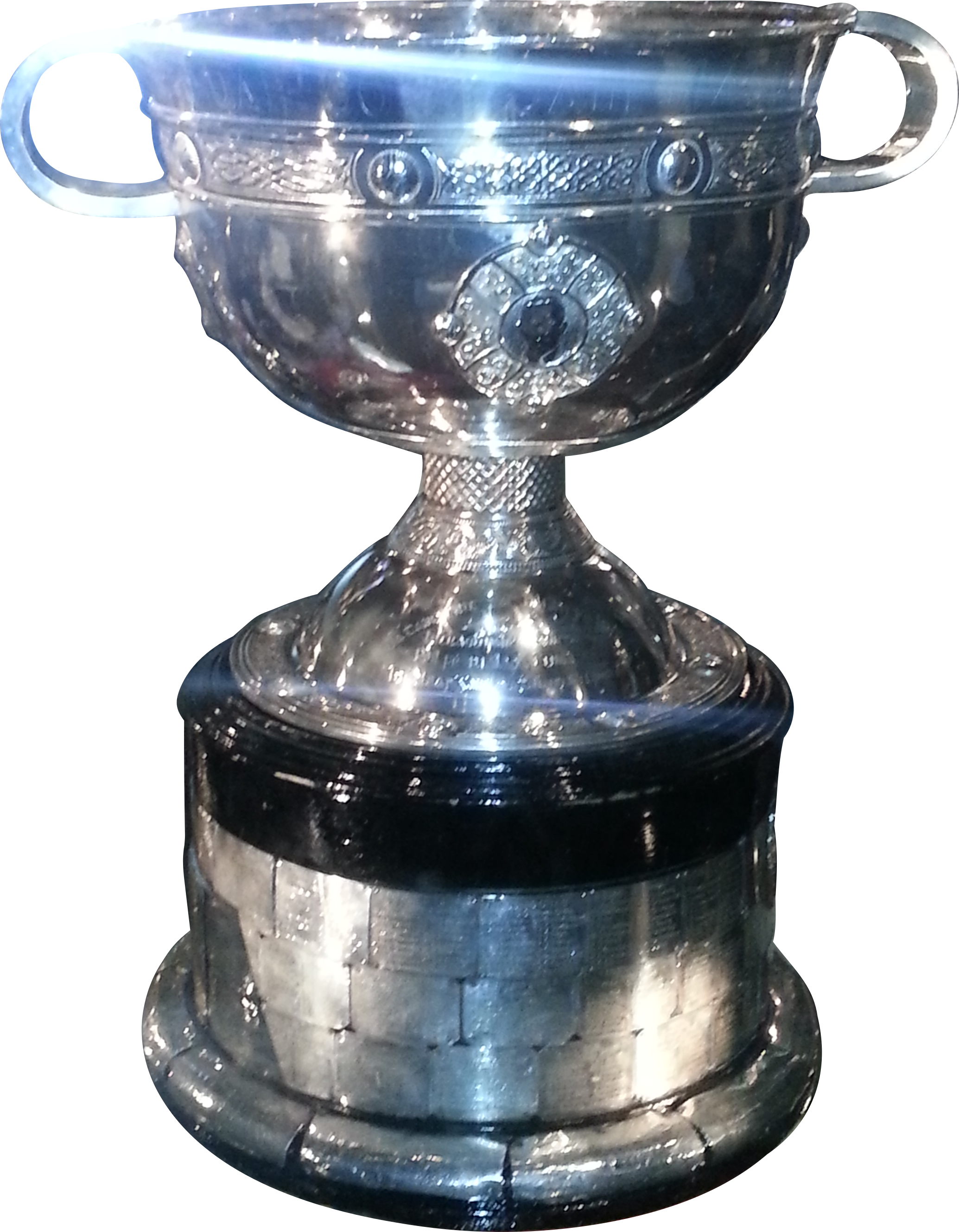
- Event: 2025 All-Ireland Senior Football Championship
Kerry	Donegal
1–26 (29)	0–19 (19)
- Date: 27 July 2025
- Venue: Croke Park, Dublin
- Man of the Match: Gavin White
- Referee: Brendan Cawley (Kildare)
- Attendance: 82,109
- Weather: 19 °C (66 °F), fine

The 2025 All-Ireland Senior Football Championship final was a Gaelic football match played at Croke Park in Dublin on 27 July 2025 between Donegal and Kerry, the culmination of the 2025 All-Ireland Senior Football Championship. It was the 138th final of that sport's primary competition, the All-Ireland Senior Football Championship.

Kerry, the Munster champion, defeated Donegal, the Ulster champion, by ten points, with a score of 1–26 (29) to 0–19 (19), claiming their 39th title.

The game was televised nationally on RTÉ One as part of The Sunday Game live programme, presented by Joanne Cantwell from the Croke Park studio, with analysis from Peter Canavan, Tomás Ó Sé and Lee Keegan. Match commentary was provided by Darragh Maloney and Éamonn Fitzmaurice. The game was also televised on BBC Two in Northern Ireland. BBC covered the final for the 3rd year in a row presented by Sarah Mulkerrins with a different punditry lineup as joined by Oisín McConville, Philly McMahon and Conor McManus. Commentary for a 3rd year was provided by Thomas Niblock and multiple All-Ireland-winning manager Mickey Harte, with pitch-side updates from Mark Sidebottom, Brendan Devenney and Owen Mulligan.

The game received a 76% audience share, with viewers on RTÉ particularly interested in the last appearance of Michael D. Higgins ahead of the game where, as is tradition, he received the players as President of Ireland.

== Background ==
Kerry entered the game as the most successful team in the history of the competition, having previously won 38 titles. They were appearing in their third final in four years and were aiming to win their first All-Ireland since 2022.

Donegal approached the match aiming to win their third All-Ireland, having previously won the title in 1992 and 2012. The 2025 final was a repeat of the 2014 final in which Kerry defeated Donegal by 2-9 to 0-12.

== Paths to the final ==
Kerry manager Jack O'Connor went into this decider looking to defeat the top three teams in Ulster, having already disposed of Armagh and Tyrone in the previous two games. His on-the-record quotes of his loathing for teams like Donegal, quotes such as "There's an arrogance to northern football which rubs Kerry people up the wrong way...'", from his book Keys to the Kingdom, received an airing ahead of the match.

This game meant Donegal became the first team to play 11 championship matches in the same season.

Donegal
Round	Date	Opponent	Venue (H/A/N)	Result	Victory margin	Score	Ref
Ulster SFC preliminary round	6 April 2025	Derry	MacCumhaill Park (H)	Win	10	1–25 to 1–15	
Ulster SFC quarter-final	20 April 2025	Monaghan	St Tiernach's Park (A)	Win	2	0–23 to 0–21	
Ulster SFC semi-final	27 April 2025	Down	St Tiernach's Park (N)	Win	6	1–19 to 0–16	
Ulster SFC final	10 May 2025	Armagh	St Tiernach's Park (N)	Win	1	2–23 to 0–28 a.e.t.	
Group game	24 May 2025	Tyrone	MacCumhaill Park (H)	Loss	–3	0–20 to 2–17	
Group game	1 June 2025	Cavan	Breffni Park (A)	Win	19	3–26 to 1–13	
Group game	15 June 2025	Mayo	Dr Hyde Park (N)	Win	1	0–19 to 1–15	
Preliminary quarter-final	22 June 2025	Louth	MacCumhaill Park (H)	Win	16	2–22 to 0–12	
Quarter-final	29 June 2025	Monaghan	Croke Park (N)	Win	6	1–26 to 1–20	
Semi-final	13 July 2025	Meath	Croke Park (N)	Win	20	3–26 to 0–15	

Kerry
Round	Date	Opponent	Venue (H/A/N)	Result	Victory margin	Score	Ref
Munster SFC semi-final	19 April 2025	Cork	Páirc Uí Chaoimh (A)	Win	2	3–21 to 1–25 a.e.t.	
Munster SFC final	4 May 2025	Clare	Fitzgerald Stadium (H)	Win	11	4–20 to 0–21	
Group game	17 May 2025	Roscommon	Fitzgerald Stadium (H)	Win	10	3–18 to 0–17	
Group game	31 May 2025	Cork	Páirc Uí Chaoimh (A)	Win	11	1–28 to 0–20	
Group game	14 June 2025	Meath	O'Connor Park (N)	Loss	–9	0–16 to 1–22	
Preliminary quarter-final	21 June 2025	Cavan	Fitzgerald Stadium (H)	Win	9	3-20 to 1–17	
Quarter-final	29 June 2025	Armagh	Croke Park (N)	Win	8	0–32 to 1–21	
Semi-final	12 July 2025	Tyrone	Croke Park (N)	Win	6	1–20 to 0–17	

== Pre-match ==
Kerry were favourites to win ahead of the game. Immediately after the semi-final results, Eamonn Sweeney wrote for the Independent that "such a tantalising match-up" had not presented itself for an All-Ireland final since 2005, "Maybe not even since the epochal Kerry-Dublin meeting of 1976".

Ahead of the game, RTÉ Raidió na Gaeltachta's Barrscéalta aired a week of specials between 21 and 25 July, and followed this with a broadcast live from Dublin on 26 July, the day before the decider. Glas agus Buí ("Green and Yellow") was the name of the RnaG pre-match special, and it was carried live from Pipers Corner in central Dublin, Kerry's Sláine Ní Chathalláin and Donegal's Damien Ó Dónaill joining forces to present. On the Thursday evening before the game, Ocean FM hosted a special edition of The Final Whistle at Seán Óg's Bar in Ballyshannon, featuring Seán Meade, who won three All-Ireland SFC titles with Galway in the 1960s, as well as former Donegal players Niall McCready, Sylvester Maguire and Anthony Molloy. RTÉ broadcast its annual television special Up for the Match the night before the game. A statue at the ancient Irish place of pilgrimage on Station Island was lit in the Donegal colours, as was the Polestar at Letterkenny. Supporters flew to Ireland from across the world for the game, including from Australia, Japan and the United States.

Several locations announced they would broadcast the game on giant open-air screens, including Navenny Park in Ballybofey, The Diamond in Donegal Town and "Hill 17" at The Gables in Ballyshannon. The annual Cemetery Sunday event at Cockhill in Buncrana was rescheduled for the previous evening to avoid a clash with the game. The local GAA club in the county's largest town, Letterkenny, began hanging flags around the town more than a week before the match. The local GAA club covering the Twin Towns of Ballybofey and Stranorlar followed suit eight days before the match. O'Hehirs, a bakery with multiple outlets across the county, ran limited edition doughnuts, cakes and cupcakes decorated with the Donegal crest and colours, and manager Jim McGuinness and goalkeeper Shaun Patton visited one outlet for the launch. Patton was set to make his 101st appearance for Donegal in the final.

Senator Manus Boyle called on M1 motorway tolls to be waived for supporters intending to travel to the final. Martin Kenny, TD for the Sligo–Leitrim, called for extra train services to be provided on the day of the final from Sligo railway station, the nearest railway station to County Donegal, to help deal with the large number of supporters intending to travel to the game. Extra train services from Kerry to Dublin were reported to be booked out.

The GAA organised official entertainment for spectators in the venue before the final, this involved music by Fiach Moriarty and John Byrne and a live show named ‘The Warm Up’ featuring former players Rory Kavanagh, Marc Ó Sé and Paddy Andrews. Drumming, fireworks, a cannon "firing kits into the crowd" and, on the silver jubilee, the Kerry team that won the 2000 All-Ireland SFC final being presented to the crowd before the match, whose captain Séamus Moynihan was due to bring the Sam Maguire Cup out with him.

=== Officials ===
On 14 July, the Irish Examiner reported on its website that Brendan Cawley was the leading contender to referee the final. The next day, he was appointed referee, his first final. He was joined by linesmen Martin McNally and David Coldrick, with McNally the stand-in referee. Cawley was following in the footsteps of several Kildare men and he was the first one since 2005 and it was his third final to be involved in overall because he was a linesman in both 2021 and 2024.

In a new initiative, Croke Park invited Donegal-based stewards to be among those working at the All-Ireland final.

=== Colours ===
On 17 July, it was announced that the teams would play the game in their alternative strips for the game, with Donegal in a mostly white jersey and Kerry in a dark blue jersey. This decision was made with the involvement of referee Brendan Cawley, and meant it would be the first final since 2010 that neither team would wear their traditional colours on All-Ireland final day, as Donegal and Kerry wore their yellow and green and green and gold in 2014.

=== Team selection ===
Eight days before the game, Kerry manager Jack O'Connor reported that all except one player had taken part in a morning training session. Tom O'Sullivan was the player not to take part. Midfielder Diarmuid O'Connor, who injured his shoulder in the 2025 NFL and had not played for Kerry since going off injured at the very beginning of the All-Ireland preliminary quarter-final defeat of Cavan, was able to do the session and Paul Geaney, another injury concern, was also able to do it.

On 24 July, Jack O'Connor named an unchanged team for the final, though he gave a list of 28 players instead of the regulation 26, with Diarmuid O'Connor and Dara Moynihan the two extra players. There was no place for Tom O'Sullivan after all. On 25 July, Donegal named an unchanged team for the final, while Kerry excluded the two from the 28: Moynihan and Conor Geaney were the players to miss out.

Eoghan Bán Gallagher and Caolan McGonagle, two of the players named to start for Donegal, also began their county's 2014 All-Ireland Minor Football Championship final loss to Kerry, while substitutes Jamie Brennan and Stephen McMenamin began the 2014 minor decider as well.

== Match ==
If the game was a draw after 70 minutes, 20 minutes of extra time would have been played. If the game was still level, the final would have been replayed on 9 August 2025.

=== Summary ===
Ciarán Thompson limped off after 23 minutes, with a scan later revealing that he had torn his ACL.

=== Details ===
RTÉ One
BBC Two NI

27 July 2025
15:30 IST (UTC+1)
Final

Report

Kerry	1-26 (29) – (19) 0-19	Donegal
(HT: 0-17 – 0-10)
Gls: J. O’Connor 1 Pts: D. Clifford 9 (3 tps), S. O’Shea 6 (2tpf, 1f), D. Geaney 3, G. White 3, P. Clifford 3, S. O’Brien 2		Pts: M. Murphy 8 (6fs), C. O’Donnell 4, O. Gallen 3, S. O’Donnell 2, C. McGonagle 1, D. Ó Baoill 1

Croke Park, Dublin
Referee: Brendan Cawley (Kildare)
Attendance: 82,300
Standby: Martin McNally (Monaghan)
Linesman: David Coldrick (Meath)
Sideline: Thomas Murphy (Galway)
Umpires: Dave Coady & Lee Moore (Ballykelly), Eoghan Fitzpatrick (Nurney), Johnny Farrell (Rathangan)

Kerry	Donegal

GK	1	Shane Ryan
FB	2	Paul Murphy
FB	3	Jason Foley
FB	4	Dylan Casey
HB	5	Brian Ó Beaglaoich	(substituted off) 63'
HB	6	Mike Breen	(substituted off) 65'
HB	7	Gavin White (c)
MF	8	Seán O'Brien	(substituted off) 50'
MF	9	Mark O'Shea
HF	10	Joe O'Connor
HF	11	Seán O'Shea
HF	12	Graham O'Sullivan	(substituted off) 69'
FF	13	David Clifford
FF	14	Paudie Clifford
FF	15	Dylan Geaney	(substituted off) 54'
Substitutes:
	16	Shane Murphy
	17	Killian Spillane	(substituted on) 54'
	18	Evan Looney	(substituted on) 63'
	19	Tom Leo O'Sullivan
	20	Tadhg Morley	(substituted on) 65'
	21	Paul Geaney
	22	Micheál Burns	(substituted on) 69'
	23	Tony Brosnan
	24	Armin Heinrich
	25	Tomás Kennedy
	26	Diarmuid O'Connor	(substituted on) 50'
Manager:
Jack O'Connor

GK	1	Shaun Patton
FB	2	Finnbarr Roarty
FB	3	Brendan McCole
FB	4	Peadar Mogan
HB	5	Ryan McHugh	(substituted off) 40'
HB	6	Eoghán Bán Gallagher	(substituted off) 58'
HB	7	Caolan McColgan	(substituted off) 36'
MF	20	Caolan McGonagle
MF	9	Michael Langan
HF	10	Shane O'Donnell
HF	11	Ciarán Thompson	(substituted off) 23'
HF	12	Ciarán Moore
FF	13	Conor O'Donnell
FF	14	Michael Murphy
FF	15	Oisín Gallen	(substituted off) 50'
Substitutes:
	16	Gavin Mulreany
	17	Stephen McMenamin
	18	Odhran McFadden Ferry
	19	Eoin McHugh
	8	Hugh McFadden	(substituted on) 36'
	21	Aaron Doherty
	22	Patrick McBrearty (c)	(substituted on) 50'
	23	Jamie Brennan	(substituted on) 58'
	24	Niall O'Donnell
	25	Daire Ó Baoill	(substituted on) 23'
	26	Jason McGee	(substituted on) 40'
Manager:
Jim McGuinness

== Post-match ==
Kerry captain Gavin White accepted the Sam Maguire Cup from GAA president Jarlath Burns in the Hogan Stand. In his post-match speech, White praised the Kerry supporters and remembered those who have passed, stating: "Don't ever underestimate the impact you have on the Kerry team's of the past and of the Kerry team".

Kerry's Paudie Clifford stated he was "absolutely over the moon", but felt that Kerry were "disrespected for a long time" by the narrative surrounding his team. Speaking to RTÉ Sport, Kerry manager Jack O'Connor reflected on a "hard-earned" title and hinted that he might be bringing his management term to an end, stating: "I'm a long time at it, and I might be passing the baton onto somebody else".

Donegal manager Jim McGuinness admitted that Kerry were the better team on the day. Speaking to RTÉ Sport after the game, he said: "We struggled with wee bits and pieces in the game and paid heavy prices".

Highlights of the final were shown on The Sunday Game programme which aired at 9:30pm that night on RTÉ2 and was presented by Jacqui Hurley.

=== Reaction ===
Former player Enda McGinley mentioned afterwards how defending was affected by the different rules brought in during 2025, whether the zonal defence deployed by Donegal for this game or the man-to-man marking deployed by other teams in earlier games: "the man-to-man defence can be torn apart with these new rules probably even quicker than the zonal defence. The quality of football that Kerry played in that first 19 minutes would tear apart pretty much whatever defensive strategy you want to do. The only way of trying to defeat that, when a team has that form and that artillery, is to win primary possession in midfield and not give it away. If you're out there competing in midfield, you're limiting the attacking options of your opponents."

Former Donegal player Manus Boyle, who was working on Ocean FM's coverage of the game, said: "[The] 2014 [final loss] was hard to take [for Donegal] as both teams weren't completely at it. But today, no complaints as Kerry were just better".

Conor McManus, referring to how the outcome of this decider had not been expected in advance, said: "No one called it the way it turned out but this was all down to Kerry and their approach to the game". His BBC colleague Oisín McConville said about Kerry: "They've played with a chip on their shoulder. If they continue to play with a chip on their shoulder nobody else in the country stands a chance with them", but, McConville added, Kerry "don't always play like that".

=== Awards ===
The Sunday Game named eight players from the winners on its Team of the Year, as well as four Donegal players and one each from Meath, Tyrone and Armagh. The TV programme gave David Clifford its Footballer of the Year.

At Kerry's banquet, which was held in the Clayton Hotel, Dublin on the night of the game, GAA President Jarlath Burns presented the Man of the Match trophy to Gavin White, after RTÉ announced him as the winner on The Sunday Game. No other nominations for the award were mentioned.

=== Celebrations ===
The Kerry team had a homecoming celebration the day after the final. Thousands of fans gathered and lined the streets as the team travelled across the county on an open top bus from Tralee at 6 pm before arriving in Killarney at 8:30 pm.

Meanwhile, despite "lashing rain" and generally very poor weather conditions, thousands of people gathered in Donegal Town's Pier car park the evening after the final to welcome home the Donegal team, with the Brendan Devenney-presented DL Debate broadcasting live from the town. Among those performing at the homecoming were Christy Murray and Daniel O'Donnell.
