= Dunkerron South =

Barony in County Kerry, Ireland

Dunkerron South Dún Ciaráin Theas (Irish)
- Barony
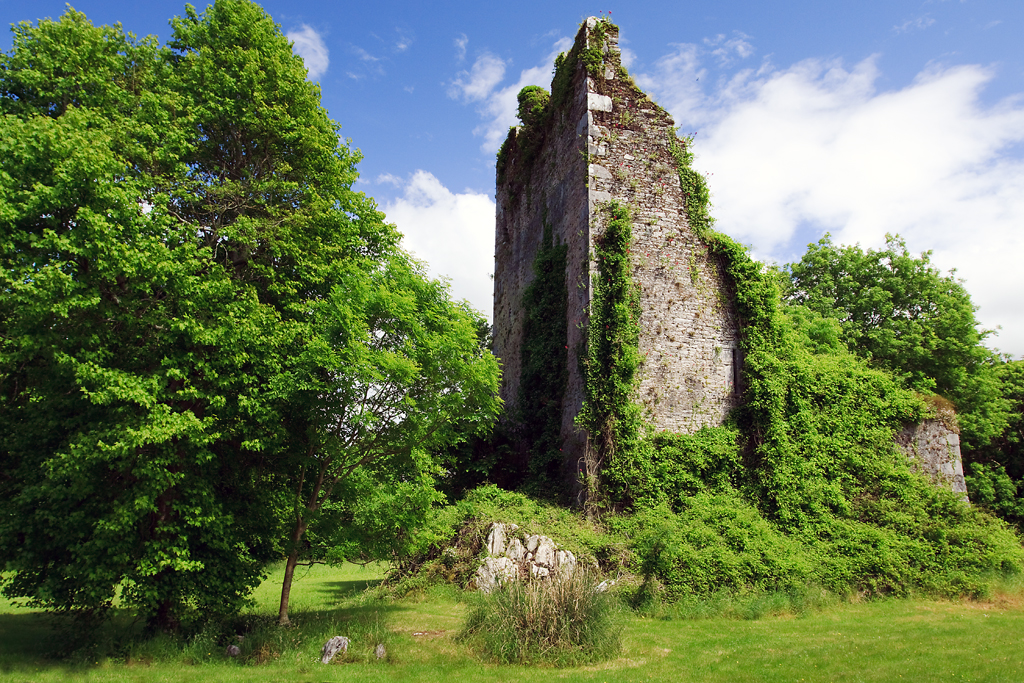
- Dunkerron Castle, west of Kenmare

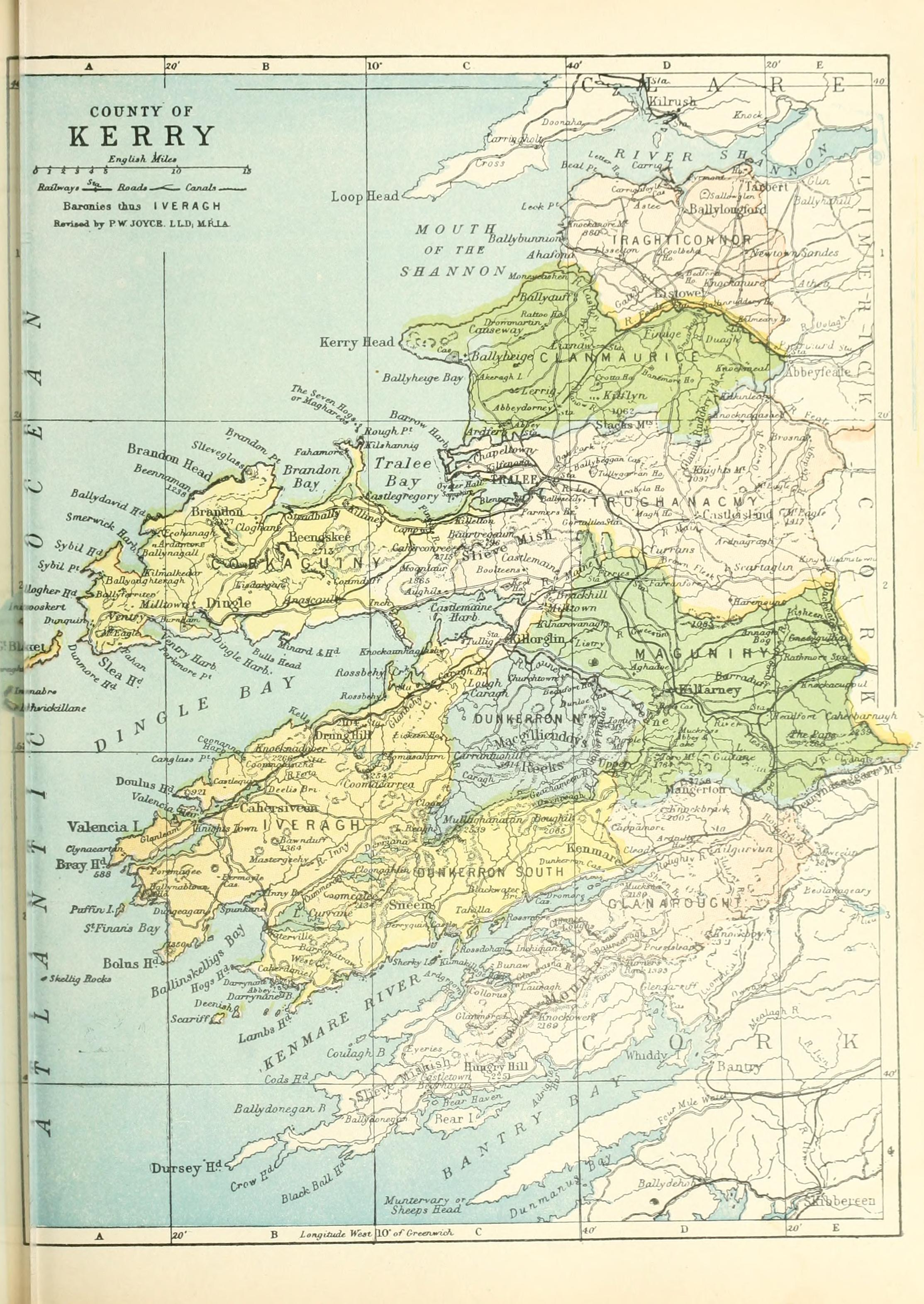
- Barony map of County Kerry, 1900; Dunkerron South barony is in the south, coloured yellow.

- Location within Ireland
- Coordinates: 51°49′N 9°56′W
- Sovereign state: Ireland
- Province: Munster
- County: Kerry

Area
  - Total: 389.7 km^{2} (150.5 sq mi)

Dunkerron South (Irish: Dún Ciaráin Theas) is a historical barony in northeastern County Kerry, Ireland.

Baronies were mainly cadastral rather than administrative units. They acquired modest local taxation and spending functions in the 19th century before being superseded by the Local Government (Ireland) Act 1898.

== History ==
The two Dunkerron baronies were originally one (named for Dunkerron Castle); they were divided into North and South some time before 1851. Dunkerron Castle derives its name from the Irish Dún Ciarán, Ciarán's hillfort; a castle has stood on the outcrop west of Kenmare since the 13th century and was a centre of O'Sullivan Mór's power; the current structure dates to 1596.

The O'Sullivan Mór were lords in this area from the 13th century. The Ó Muircheartaigh (Moriartys) were chiefs of Aes Asdi of Orlar Eiltaigh (modern Templenoe).

== Geography ==
Dunkerron South is in the south of the county, making up the southern third of the Iveragh Peninsula. It is south of MacGillycuddy's Reeks and north of the Kenmare River.

== List of settlements ==
Settlements within the historical barony of Dunkerron South include:

- Caherdaniel
- Sneem
