= Tommy Conroy =

Tommy Conroy may refer to:

- Tommy Conroy (Dublin Gaelic footballer)
- Tommy Conroy (Mayo Gaelic footballer)

== See also ==
- Tom Conroy, American politician
- Tom Conroy (rugby league)
