= John McElligott =

John McElligott may refer to:

- John J. McElligott (1882–1946), American fire commissioner
- John L. McElligott (born 1958), Irish Gaelic footballer
