= Jimmy Dennigan =

Gaelic footballer, hurler, coach and referee

Personal information
- Born: 1939
- Died: 2012
- Years active: c. 1960s–?
- Employer: GAA
- Relative: Colette Swift (daughter)
- Other interests: Greyhound racing

Sport
- Sport: Gaelic football
- Position: Referee
- Club: Fermoy

James "Jimmy" Dennigan (1939 – 2012) was a Gaelic footballer, hurler, coach and referee from County Cork. A member of the Fermoy club, he refereed the 1986 All-Ireland Senior Football Championship Final, as well as numerous other important games.

At the time of his death he was one of only six Corkmen to have refereed an All-Ireland SFC final.

== Career ==
=== Sportsman ===
Jimmy Dennigan played for the Cork GAA minor team in 1956 and was the centre half-back in 1957. He was an Avondhu senior player in 1958 and also played for Cork that year again. In 1959 he was left half-back on the Fermoy team that won the Kelleher Shield. Later, an injury that he got in 1960 forced his retirement from playing, but he still managed to feature for the Fermoy junior hurlers in 1964's North Cork JHC final and replay victory against Ballyhea in Kildorrery. Derry Gowen, the prominent inter-county referee, knew Dennigan and encouraged him to take up the role himself.

=== Referee ===
Soon he was refereeing in the National League. He refereed nine County SFC finals, seven of which were Cork Senior Football Championship finals and the other two in Limerick and Waterford. He was involved in all grades of the game in Munster except senior, owing to Cork's constant presence there. He refereed the All Ireland Minor semi-finals 1968 and 1976, the Minor final of 1978, the 1979 National Football League semi-final and final and the All Ireland Senior semi-final between Dublin and Roscommon. He toured with the Bank of Ireland All Stars in 1982 and refereed games at Gaelic Park New York and in San Francisco. He refereed the 1986 All-Ireland Senior Football Championship Final, where Kerry and Tyrone went at each other, the same day he was a Cork minor selector in the earlier game.

=== Coach ===
After stopping playing, Dennigan took up a position as a coach at Gormanston College, coaching Fermoy to three consecutive North Cork titles, the Fermoy junior football team and the Avondhu senior team.

=== Greyhound racing ===
Later he took up greyhound racing, earning a reputation as an owner/trainer at facilities including Youghal and Curraheen Park.

== Personal life ==
His brother Kieran played senior football for Fermoy, his son John also played for Fermoy. His daughter Colette Swift made her own name as a prominent cyclist in France.

He died in Fermoy on the last day of the year 2012 (see 2012 in Ireland). He was married, with three daughters and a son. He was 73 years old.
