= Tuosist GAA =

Gaelic games club in County Kerry, Ireland

- C.L.G. Tuath O'Siosta
- Founded: 1972
- County: Kerry
- Colours: Green & Red
- Grounds: Phil O'Sullivan Park
- Coordinates: 51°45′51.66″N 9°46′21.16″W

Playing kits
Standard colours

Tuosist GAA (Full name in Irish: Cumann Lúthchleas Gael Tuath O'Siosta) is a Gaelic Athletic Association club from Tuosist in County Kerry, Ireland. It is the only Kerry club on the Beara Peninsula as all other clubs are in County Cork. The club competes as a joint divisional side with other clubs from the Kenmare area like in the county championships and as an individual club in other competitions like the Kerry County League division 3 and the Kerry Novice Football Championship. They are the Current Finnegan Cup holders.

The club was founded in 1972. It provides opportunities for the youth of the parish of Tuosist to play Gaelic football in juvenile, minor, and senior teams. The pitch and dressing rooms are in Lauragh on the road to Castletownbere but a new all-weather pitch is under construction in Ardea to be opened in 2026. As for the parish, Saint Kilian is the patron saint of the club.

== Finnegan Cup ==
The 4 clubs in the Kenmare District play for the Finnegan Cup in the Kenmare district board championship. The Kenmare District is the smallest such district in Kerry. The 4 clubs are:

- Templenoe GAA
- Tuosist GAA
- Kenmare GAA
- Kilgarvan GAA

== Kerry Junior Football Championship ==
They've won the Con Brosnan Cup in 1975.

=== Kerry Novice Football Championship ===
Tuosist have played in three Kerry Novice Football Championship finals and won their first in 2008. The Kerry Novice Football Championship is fourth level Gaelic football. The trophy is known as the Quirke and Hickey Cup. The competition is the second lowest level of adult competition played in County Kerry. The winning team represents Kerry GAA in the Munster Junior B Football championship. The winners will also be promoted to play in the Kerry Junior Football Championship for the following year.

Year	Winner	Opponent
2008	Tuosist	Scartaglin
2005	Beale	Tousist
2001	Renard	Tousist
