= Adrian Spillane =

Kerry Gaelic footballer

Personal information
- Nickname: Moses/Ado
- Born: 19 April 1994 (age 32)

Sport
- Sport: Gaelic football
Club
- Years: Club
- Templenoe
Inter-county
- Years: County
- 2019–2024: Kerry

Adrian Spillane (born 19 April 1994) is a Gaelic footballer who plays for the Templenoe club and formerly the Kerry county team.

He is the son of the famous Kerry footballer Tom and thus his uncles are Mick and Pat who also played for Kerry.

His brother Killian is also a county player.
