= Ger Lynch =

Kerry Gaelic footballer

Personal information
- Native name: Gearóid Ó Loingsigh (Irish)
- Born: 10 December 1958 (age 67) Valentia Island, County Kerry, Ireland
- Occupation: Psychiatric nurse
- Height: 5 ft 11 in (180 cm)

Sport
- Sport: Gaelic football
- Position: Wing back
Club
- Years: Club
- 1970s–1990s: Valentia
Club titles
- Kerry titles: 2
Inter-county
Years	County	Apps (scores)
1982–1989	Kerry	21 (0–1)
Inter-county titles
- Munster titles: 3
- All-Irelands: 3
- NFL: 1
- All Stars: 1

Ger Lynch (born 10 December 1958) is an Irish former Gaelic footballer who played as a wing back at senior level for the Kerry county team.

Lynch made his first appearance for the team during the 1982 championship and became a regular player over subsequent seasons until his retirement in 1989. During that time he won three All-Ireland winners' medals, three Munster winners' medals, one National Football League winners' medal and one All-Star award.

Himself and Tom Spillane — assigned to mark Tommy Conroy and Barney Rock during the 1984 All-Ireland Senior Football Championship Final — began their efforts during the national anthem, which they sang with aplomb. Spillane, quoted in the book Princes of Pigskin, said of this tactic later: "There was no belting but the plot was to sing the National Anthem as loud as we could into their ears to put the fear of God into them. Neither of us were great singers but they must have thought we were wired to the moon".

Lynch has two children: Muireann and Tadhg Lynch. His nephew is County Down referee Philip Cauley of St.Pauls GAC.
