= Dunkerron North =

Barony in County Kerry, Ireland

Dunkerron North Dún Ciaráin Thuaidh (Irish)
- Barony
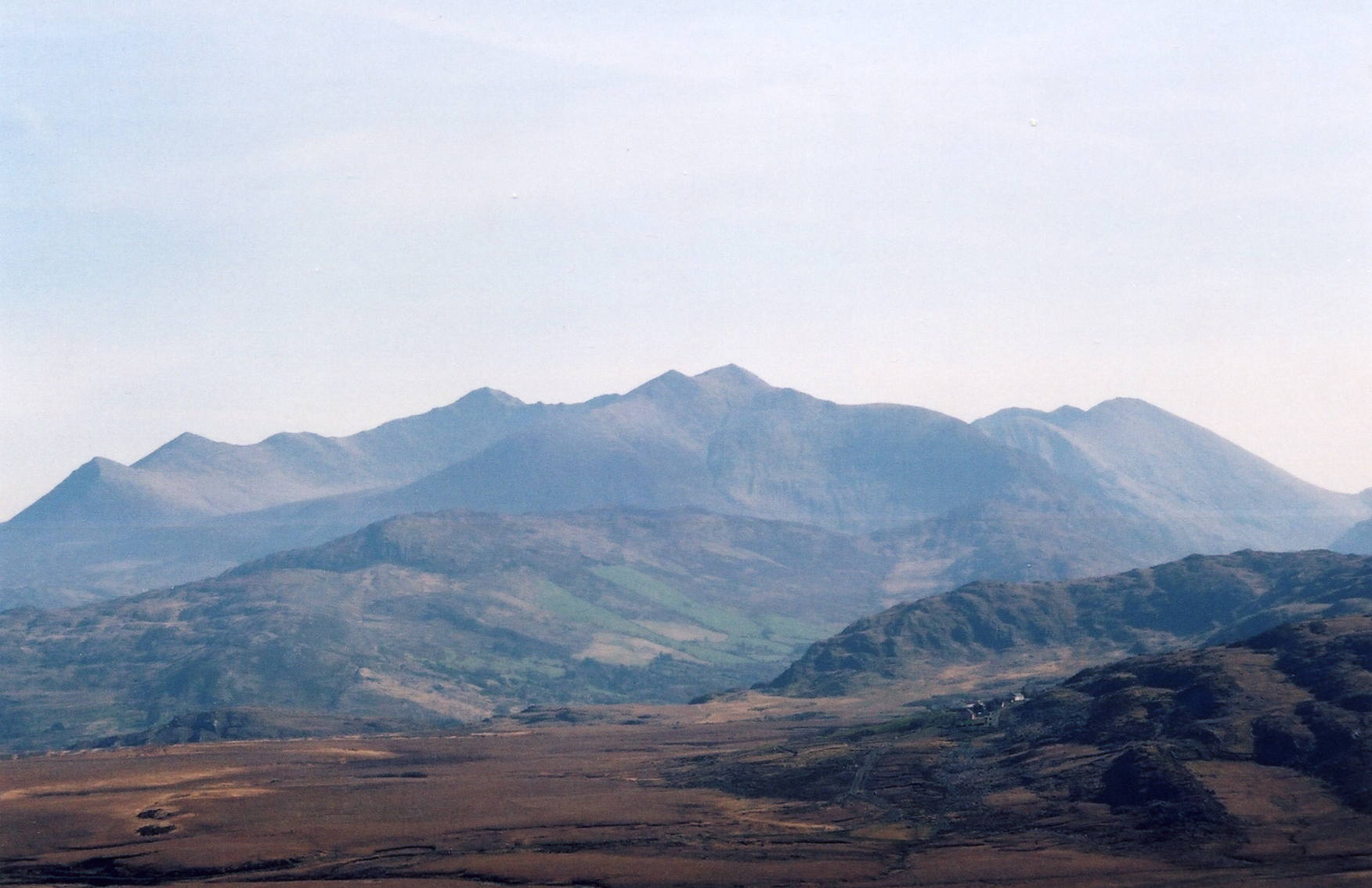
- MacGillycuddy's Reeks

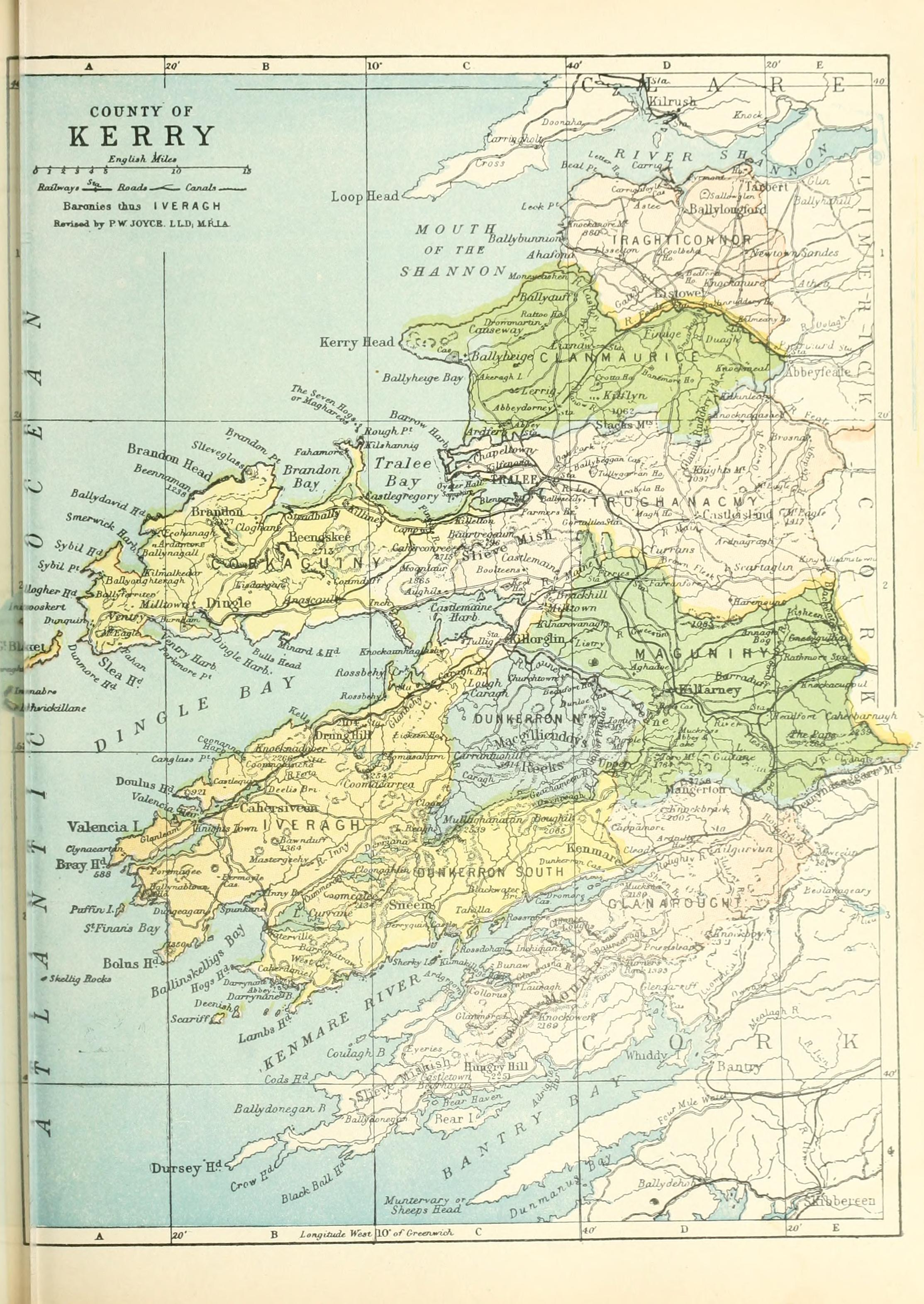
- Barony map of County Kerry, 1900; Dunkerron North barony is in the middle, coloured blue.

- Location within Ireland
- Coordinates: 52°00′N 9°44′W
- Sovereign state: Ireland
- Province: Munster
- County: Kerry

Area
  - Total: 293.0 km^{2} (113.1 sq mi)

Dunkerron North (Irish: Dún Ciaráin Thuaidh) is a historical barony in central County Kerry, Ireland.

Baronies were mainly cadastral rather than administrative units. They acquired modest local taxation and spending functions in the 19th century before being superseded by the Local Government (Ireland) Act 1898.

== History ==
The two Dunkerron baronies were originally one (named for Dunkerron Castle); they were divided into North and South some time before 1851.

The O'Sullivan Mór were lords in this area in the early 13th century; their descendants, the McGillicuddys, were lords here, with the ruler called McGillycuddy of the Reeks.

== Geography ==
Dunkerron North is in the centre of the county, incorporating MacGillycuddy's Reeks and the surrounding area, including Carrauntoohil, Ireland's highest mountain. It is bounded to the east by the River Laune.

== List of settlements ==
Settlements within the historical barony of Dunkerron North include:

- Glencar
- Kilgobnet
