= Christy Murray =

Piper from County Donegal, Ireland

- Also known as: The Donegal Piper
- Born: 1960s
- Origin: Raphoe, County Donegal
- Genres: Woodwind
- Occupation: Music educator
- Instrument(s): Bagpipes; Tin whistle
- Years active: 1980s–present

Christy Murray (born 1960s), known as the Donegal Piper, is an Irish piper, tin whistle player and music educator from County Donegal. He is regarded as "famous across the country" for teaching children how to play the tin whistle. He is also noted as a supporter of the Donegal county football team, and plays his pipes on match-days, hence the name of Donegal Piper. Until the COVID-19 pandemic disrupted the sport, Murray had not missed a competitive Donegal game since the 1990s.

== Biography ==
Murray is from Raphoe. He teaches music, particularly the tin whistle, in schools.

Murray first attended a Donegal match as a supporter during the 1980s, to see the team at under-21 level. His pipes first began to appear at games in the late 1990s when he witnessed a disappointed piper departing Ballyshannon's Fr Tierney Park after his team, Dublin, had lost by one point.

Murray wears a special uniform consisting of his team colours of gold and green. He bought it from a Unionist, who found the circumstances much to his amusement. However, Murray did not wear his uniform to the first game he brought his pipes, a match against Armagh. His daughter has also played for supporters alongside him.

Murray tours local pubs early on match-day. There is camaraderie between him and supporters, including supporters of the opposition team. Children are particularly fond of him. He mainly plays local tunes, but also ensures he has something known to fans of the opposing team. He has joined in with Dublin's bodhrán players at matches in MacCumhaill Park. At each game he attends, he receives requests for photographs from other spectators. However, he was once attacked at a Louth game, "a malicious attack and once or twice things have happened but usually because there has been drink involved".

Murray circles the pitch perimeter one hour before throw-in and marches up and down the stand approximately thirty minutes before throw-in. At throw-in, he places his pipes beneath his seat and produces them again upon the half-time whistle. He has often been on the pitch at half-time and has been on the pitch after the concluding whistle of Donegal's winning finals of the Ulster Senior Football Championship at St Tiernach's Park. He also led the Donegal team into his native Raphoe when they won the Sam Maguire Cup in 2012.

A decision by Croke Park officials to prevent Murray entering the stadium with his pipes before a 2020 National Football League match against Dublin proved contentious; he was told not to play his pipes during matches even though he had been abiding by this since the beginning. He spent forty minutes pleading his case as stewards attempted to confiscate his instrument and security personnel then told him would never be allowed in again with his pipes. A spokeswoman for Croke Park claimed Murray himself had not been denied entry to the stadium (though neglected to mention his pipes). Murray said he had never previously experienced such behaviour. After initially thinking about giving up playing the pipes, he appeared at Fr Tierney Park for Donegal's next game, against Monaghan. He was personally, and officially, welcomed on this occasion.

Murray has performed on Highland Radio. He became a grandfather in October 2020.

He performed at the homecoming for the Donegal team after the 2025 All-Ireland Senior Football Championship final.
