= Dunkerron Castle =

Ruined tower house in County Kerry, Ireland

- Templenoe, County Kerry; Near Kenmare in Ireland
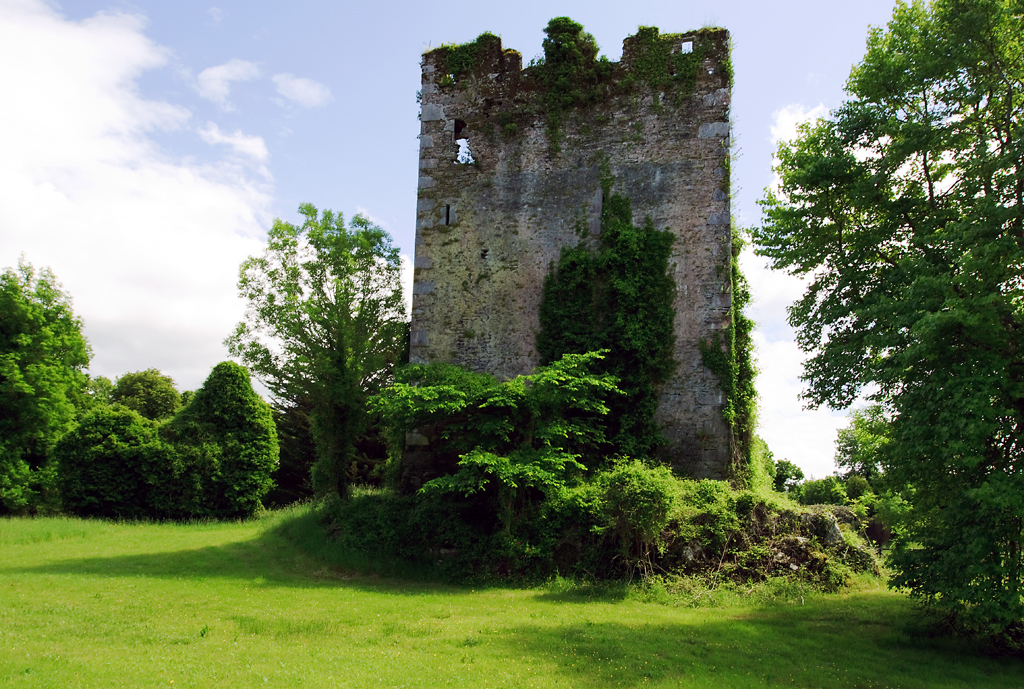
- Tower house at Dunkerron

Site information
- Type: Tower house
- Condition: Ruin

Location
- Coordinates: 51°52′32″N 9°37′15″W
- Height: 4 storeys

Site history
- Built: 13th century (Norman tower house), 16th century (Adjoining court house)

Dunkerron Castle (Irish: Caisleán Dún Ciarán) is a ruined four-storey tower house located in Templenoe, near Kenmare, County Kerry, in south-west Ireland. The castle was the family seat of the O'Sullivan Mór family from the late 16th century.

== History ==
The four-storey tower house was built in the 13th century on a limestone outcrop as a Norman (Carew) stronghold. Several later structures of the castle, including an enclosed court, date to the late 16th century, when Owen O'Sullivan became 'Chief of the Name' and acceded to the title of 'O'Sullivan Mór'. An inscribed plaque, dated 1596, recorded the castle's association with the O'Sullivan Mór and MacCarthy Reagh dynasties. The castle was the family seat of the O'Sullivan Mór for some time.

The main O'Sullivan Mór familial seat moved to nearby Cappanacush Castle during the 17th century, and antiquary Samuel Lewis noted that both castles were "traditionally said to have been defended" by their O'Sullivan Mór owners during the mid-17th century Cromwellian conquest of Ireland. The O'Sullivan castles and lands at Dunkerron and Cappanacush were confiscated following this conflict under the Act for the Settlement of Ireland 1652, and assigned to Cromwellian supporter William Petty. Later O'Sullivan attempts to have the lands returned were not successful.

By the 19th century, maps record the castle and court as being "in ruins", and a Victorian manor house, Dunkerron House, was built on the estate around that time.

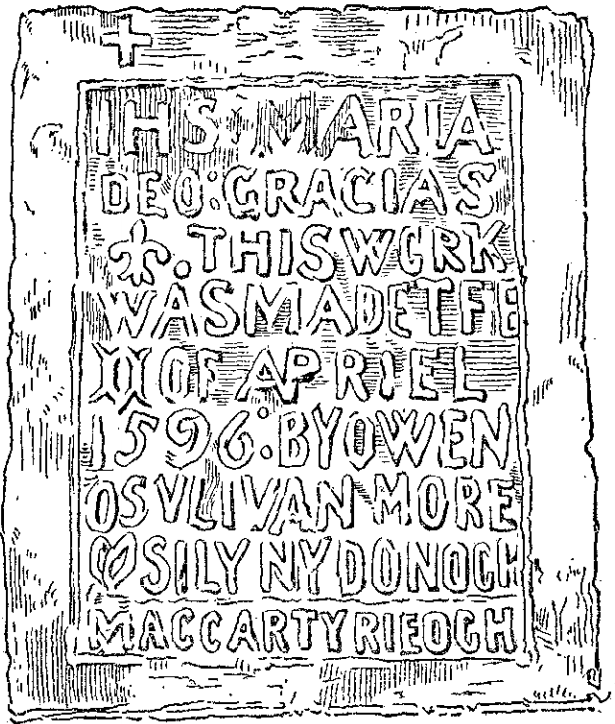
Text from an inscribed stone which is dated 1596, and attributes certain works at the castle to Owen O'Sullivan Mór and his wife Sily Ní Donogh MacCarthy Reagh.

Dunkerron Castle gives its name to the barony of Dunkerron, later divided into Dunkerron South (the southern part of the Iveragh Peninsula) and Dunkerron North (the area around MacGillycuddy's Reeks).

== Title ==
One of the last members of a branch of the O'Sullivans was Donal O'Sullivan, who died on 16 April 1754, without issue or heirs. The title he bore, the "Prince of Dunkerron", became extinct on his death. The British monarchy did issue a peerage title of Baron Dunkeron to John Petty. (John Petty was Sheriff of Kerry from 1732, and a descendant of the William Petty to whom the lands had been given following the Cromwellian confiscations). The title assigned to Petty was not however related to the original title of the native Irish nobility.
