= Shane Ryan (Kerry Gaelic footballer) =

Kerry Gaelic footballer

Shane Ryan is an Irish Gaelic footballer who plays for the Rathmore club and at senior level for the Kerry county team. His inter-county position is goalkeeper, but he plays full-forward for Rathmore.

As a youth he also played association football and once had a trial at goalkeeper for Nottingham Forest Academy.

== Honours ==
Rathmore

- Kerry Intermediate Football Championship: (1) 2022
- Munster Intermediate Club Football Championship: (1) 2022
- All-Ireland Intermediate Club Football Championship: (1) 2023
- East Kerry Senior Football Championship: (4) 2014, 2015, 2016, 2017

East Kerry

- Kerry Senior Football Championship: (3) 2020, 2022, 2023

Kerry

- All-Ireland Senior Football Championship (2): 2022, 2025
- National Football League (3): 2020, 2021, 2022
- McGrath Cup: 2022
- Munster Senior Football Championship (6): 2019, 2021, 2022, 2023, 2024, 2025
- Munster Under-21 Football Championship (1): 2017
- Munster Minor Football Championship (2): 2013, 2014
- All-Ireland Minor Football Championship (1): 2014

Individual

- All Star (1): 2022
- The Sunday Game Team of the Year (2): 2022, 2025
