= Mike O'Donoghue =

Irish Gaelic footballer (born 1987)

Personal information
- Born: 1987 (age 38–39) Killarney, County Kerry, Ireland
- Height: 6 ft 0 in (183 cm)

Sport
- Sport: Gaelic football
- Position: Forward
Club
- Years: Club
- 2000's-: Spa
Inter-county
- Years: County
- 2013-: Kerry

Mike O'Donoghue (born 1987 in Killarney, County Kerry) is an Irish Gaelic footballer. He has played for Spa and the Kerry inter-county teams.

As a teenager, he played with St. Brendan's College, Killarney. He was a member of the Kerry minor team in 2004 where he won a Munster title and later played in the All Ireland final loss to Tyrone. The following year he was captain of the team but had little success.

He then moved on to the Under 21 team, he had little success in 2006 and 2007. In 2008, he won a Munster title, Kerry's first since 2002, he later scored 2 goals in the final as Kerry beat Kildare to win a first title since 1998. He was awarded the award of Munster u-21 Footballer of the year in 2008.

He was part of the Junior team in 2007 but had little success. After the Under 21 success of 2008 he joined the Junior again where he won a Munster title. He was part of the team again in 2009 but had little success. In 2010, he was made captain of the Junior team and O' Donoghue won a second Munster title, Kerry later had a surprise loss to Sligo in the All Ireland final. He was awarded the award of Munster Junior Footballer of the year in 2010. He played no part with the Juniors in 2011 but was back in 2012 where he won a third Munster title and later won an All Ireland title after Kerry overcame Mayo.

In 2013, he played in all of Kerry's McGrath Cup games including the final win over Tipperary. He also played in three National League games.

At club level he won County and Munster Intermediate titles with Spa in 2009 and played in the 2010 All Ireland final but lost out to Tyrone side Cookstown Fr. Rock's. In 2004, he won a Kerry minor championship with East Kerry.
