= Tom Spillane =

Kerry Gaelic footballer

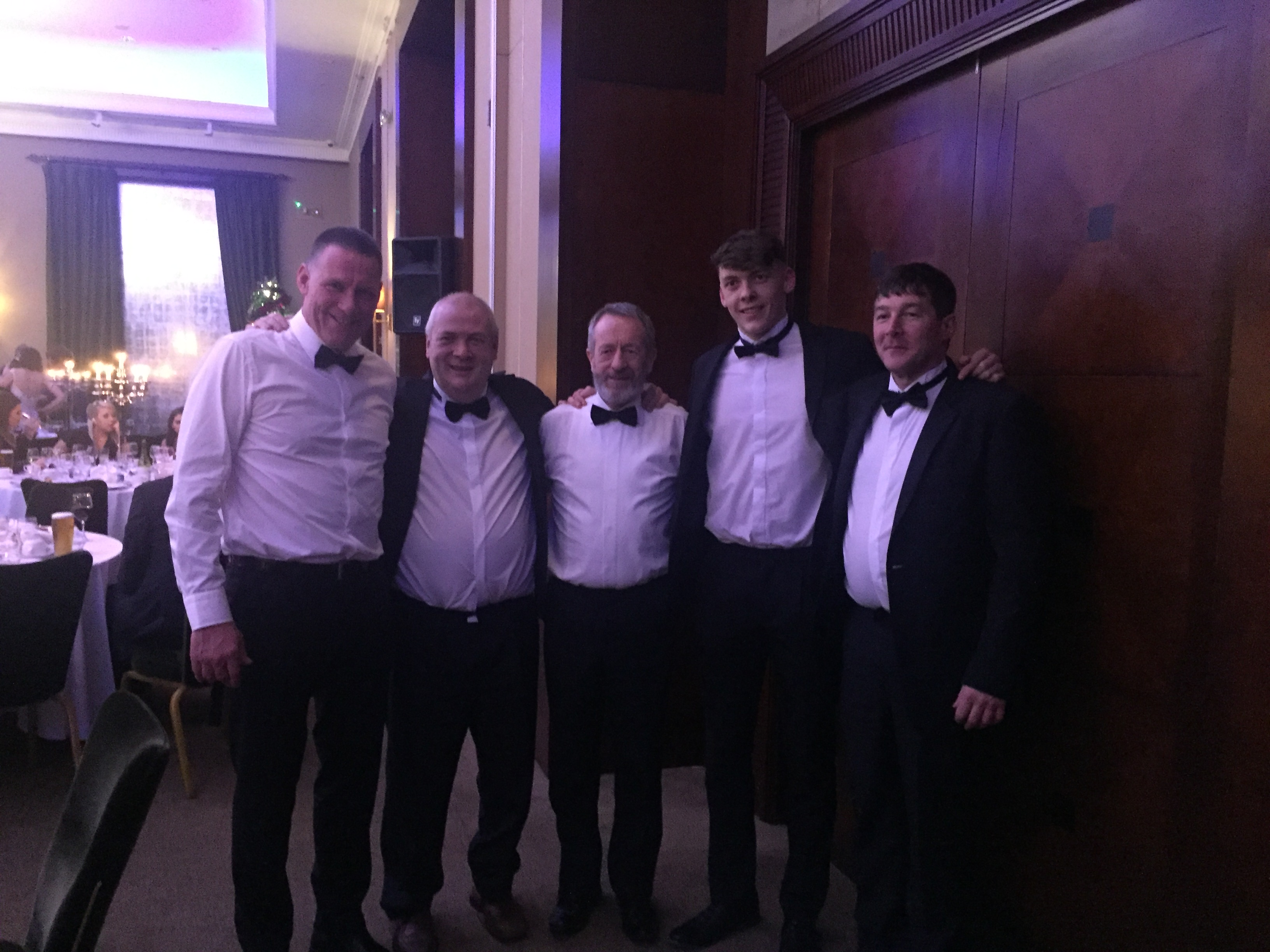
- Tom Spillane (first from left) with Fossa chairman Dermot Clifford, former GAA president Seán Kelly, David Clifford and Fossa secretary Merry Talbot, in 2017

Personal information
- Born: 1962 (age 63–64) Templenoe, County Kerry
- Occupation: Auctioneer

Sport
- Sport: Gaelic football
- Position: Half-back
Club
- Years: Club
- Templenoe
Inter-county
Years	County	Apps (scores)
1981–1991	Kerry	27 (1–13)
Inter-county titles
- Munster titles: 5
- All-Irelands: 4
- All Stars: 3

Tom Spillane (born 1962) is an Irish former Gaelic footballer who played for Templenoe and the Kerry county team in the 1980s.

== Early life ==
Maura Spillane gave birth to Tom in Templenoe, near Kenmare, County Kerry in 1962. He was — along with his brothers Pat and Mick — destined to become a key member of the successful Kerry Gaelic football teams of the 1980s.

== Playing career ==
Spillane won an All-Ireland Minor Football Championship (MFC) medal in 1980 before first breaking into the county panel in 1981. He played with Kerry for the next eleven seasons, winning four All-Ireland Senior Football Championship (SFC) medals, five Munster SFC medals, one Kerry SFC and three All Stars.

Himself and Ger Lynch — assigned to mark Tommy Conroy and Barney Rock during the 1984 All-Ireland SFC final — began their efforts during the national anthem, which they sang with aplomb. Spillane, quoted in the book Princes of Pigskin, said of this tactic later: "There was no belting but the plot was to sing the National Anthem as loud as we could into their ears to put the fear of God into them. Neither of us were great singers but they must have thought we were wired to the moon".

Together with his brothers Mick and Pat, the Spillanes hold a record 19 All-Ireland SFC medals between them. However, he won a mere four All-Ireland medals besides Mick's seven and Pat's eight.

== Personal life ==
Tom Spillane works as an auctioneer and runs his business from Killarney. He specialises in dealing with property in the Killarney and Kenmare areas.

Spillane's brother Pat took over their mother's bar, renaming it Pat Spillane's Bar, and ran it before leasing it. Tom Spillane bought the pub from Pat Spillane in the late 2010s, with the intention of running it alongside his sons Killian and Adrian (also Kerry footballers).
