= Diarmuid O'Connor (Kerry Gaelic footballer) =

Gaelic football player

Diarmuid O'Connor (born 1999) is an Irish Gaelic footballer who plays in midfield for Na Gaeil and at senior level for the Kerry county team.

From Tralee, O'Connor won two All-Ireland Minor Football Championship medals in 2016 and 2017, and was an All-Ireland Under-20 Football Championship semi-finalist in 2018. He was part of the team that won the 2022 All-Ireland Senior Football Championship title. He received a winner's medal in the 2025 All-Ireland Senior Football Championship, marking the occasion with his introduction as a substitute in the fiftieth minute of the final, having been injured since the Cavan game in the preliminary quarter-final.
