= John L. McElligott =

Irish Gaelic footballer

Personal information
- Native name: Seán L. Mac Uileagóid (Irish)
- Born: 1958 (age 67–68) Tralee, County Kerry, Ireland

Sport
- Sport: Gaelic football
- Position: Right wing-forward
Club
- Years: Club
- Austin Stacks
Club titles
- Kerry titles: 3
- Munster titles: 1
- All-Ireland Titles: 1
Inter-county
Years	County	Apps (scores)
1979-1985	Kerry	4 (0-00)
Inter-county titles
- Munster titles: 2
- All-Irelands: 1
- NFL: 2
- All Stars: 0

John L. McElligott (born 1958) is an Irish retired Gaelic footballer. His league and championship career with the Kerry senior team spanned eight seasons from 1979 to 1985.

McElliigott made his debut on the inter-county scene at the age of seventeen when he was selected for the Kerry minor team in 1976. He had one championship season with the minor team in which he was a Munster Minor Football Championship runner-up. McElligott subsequently joined the Kerry under-21 team, culminating as an All-Ireland runner-up in 1978. He later joined the Kerry senior team after being added to the panel for the 1979 championship. Over the course of the next eight seasons, McElligott won one All-Ireland medal. He also won two Munster medals and two National Football League medals. He played his last game for Kerry in October 1985.

== Honours ==
Austin Stacks

- All-Ireland Senior Club Football Championship (1): 1977
- Munster Senior Club Football Championship (1): 1976
- Kerry Senior Football Championship (3): 1976, 1979, 1986

Kerry

- All-Ireland Senior Football Championship (1): 1979
- Munster Senior Football Championship (2): 1979, 1982
- National Football League (2): 1981-82, 1983-84
- Munster Under-21 Football Championship (1): 1978
