= Paudie O'Mahony =

Irish Gaelic footballer

Personal information
- Native name: Páidí Ó Mathúna (Irish)
- Born: 1952 (age 73–74) Killarney, County Kerry, Ireland
- Occupation: Engineer
- Height: 6 ft 0 in (183 cm)

Sport
- Sport: Gaelic football
- Position: Goalkeeper
Club
- Years: Club
- Spa
Club titles
- Kerry titles: 0
Inter-county
Years	County	Apps (scores)
1973-1982	Kerry	15 (0-00)
Inter-county titles
- Munster titles: 8
- All-Irelands: 5
- NFL: 1
- All Stars: 1

Paudie O'Mahony (born 1952) is an Irish former Gaelic footballer. His league and championship career at senior level for the Kerry county team spanned nine seasons from 1973 to 1982.

== Playing career ==
O'Mahony made his debut on the inter-county scene at the age of seventeen when he was selected for the Kerry minor team in 1970. He spent one championship season with the minor team; however, he was an All-Ireland MFC runner-up. O'Mahony subsequently joined the Kerry under-21 team, winning an All-Ireland medal in 1973. Later that year he joined the Kerry senior team, making his debut during the 1973–74 league. Over the course of the next nine seasons, O'Mahony won five All-Ireland SFC medals, beginning with a lone triumph on the field of play in 1975, followed by a record-equalling four championships in-a-row as a non-playing substitute from 1978 to 1981. He also won eight Munster SFC medals and one National Football League medal. He retired from inter-county football following Kerry's failure to secure a fifth successive All-Ireland SFC title in 1982.

== Personal life ==
O'Mahony participated in the 2014 series of Operation Transformation.

O'Mahoney, a civil engineer by profession, ran his own consultancy for 24 years. However, after the post-2008 Irish economic downturn, he was forced to close it down due to major cash-flow problems.

== Honours ==
Kerry

- All-Ireland Senior Football Championship (5): 1975, 1978, 1979, 1980, 1981
- Munster Senior Football Championship (8): 1975, 1976, 1977, 1978, 1979, 1980, 1981, 1982
- National Football League (1): 1973-74
- All-Ireland Under-21 Football Championship (1): 1973
- Munster Under-21 Football Championship (1): 1973
- Munster Minor Football Championship (1): 1970

Munster

- Railway Cup (2): 1976, 1978
