= Killian Spillane =

Kerry Gaelic footballer

Personal information
- Born: Tralee, Ireland
- Occupation: Student
- Height: 1.86 m (6 ft 1 in)

Sport
- Sport: Gaelic football
- Position: Right corner forward
Club
- Years: Club
- 2014-: Templenoe
College
- Years: College
- UCC
College titles
- Sigerson titles: 1
Inter-county*
Years	County	Apps (scores)
2019-	Kerry	14 (2-25)
Inter-county titles
- Munster titles: 2
- All-Irelands: 2
- NFL: 2
- *Inter County team apps and scores correct as of match played 24 July 2022.

Killian Spillane is a Gaelic footballer who plays for the Templenoe club and the Kerry county team.

Killian Spillane is the son of Tom. His uncles Mick and Pat also played for Kerry, as has his brother Adrian.

== Inter-county ==
=== Minor ===
Spillane first played for Kerry in the 2013 All-Ireland Minor Football Championship. He won a Munster Minor Football Championship after beating Tipperary in the final. His side later lost out to Tyrone in the All-Ireland semi-final.

He was underage again for the 2014 All-Ireland Minor Football Championship. He won a second Munster title by overcoming Cork in the final scoring seven points in the final. Kerry qualified a first All-Ireland minor final since 2006 when they took on Donegal. Spillane scored five points as Kerry won the title for the first time since 1994.

=== Under 21 ===
He joined the Kerry Under 21 team in 2016. Despite many of the 2014 MFC winning team Kerry lost out to Cork in the Munster final. He was back again in 2017 and again faced Cork in the Munster final. He scored five points as Kerry won the first Munster Under 21 title since 2008. They suffered a disappointing loss to Galway in the All-Ireland semi-final.

=== Junior ===
Spillane joined the Kerry Junior team in 2015. He joined the panel for the All-Ireland semi-final with Wexford, scoring a goal as a sub. He started in the All-Ireland final with Mayo, he scored two points as Kerry won the title for the first time since 2012.

He was back with the Junior team in 2017 as captain. He won his first Munster Junior title after overcoming Cork in the final. Kerry faced Meath in the final, in a game where Spillane scored three points to help his side to win and pick up a second All Ireland JFC title.

=== Senior ===
In the 2021 Munster final Spillane scored 0–2 as Kerry beat Cork 4–22 to 1–9. In the 2022 Munster final he scored 1–3 as Kerry beat Limerick 1–28 to 0–8. In the 2022 All-Ireland Senior Football Championship Final he came off the bench at half time and scored 0–2 as Kerry beat Galway 0–20 to 0–16.

== Career statistics ==
As of match played 24 July 2022

Team	Year	National League			Munster		All-Ireland		Total	
Team	Year	Division	Apps	Score	Apps	Score	Apps	Score	Apps	Score
Kerry Minor	2013	—								
Kerry Minor	2014	—								
Kerry Minor	Total	—								
Kerry	2019	Division 1	3	0-00	0	0-00	5	1-07	8	1-07
Kerry	2020	Division 1	5	0-02	1	0-04	-		6	0-06
Kerry	2021	Division 1	3	0-06	3	0-08	1	0-00	7	0-14
Kerry	2022	Division 1	5	1-02	1	1-03	3	0-03	9	2-08
Kerry	Total		16	1-10	5	1-15	9	1-10	30	3-35

== Honours ==
Kerry

- All-Ireland Senior Football Championship (2): 2022, 2024
- Munster Senior Football Championship (5): 2021, 2022, 2023, 2024, 2025
- Munster Junior Football Championship (1): 2017 (C)
- All-Ireland Junior Football Championship (2): 2015, 2017 (C)
- Munster Under-21 Football Championship (1): 2017
- Munster Minor Football Championship (2): 2013, 2014
- All-Ireland Minor Football Championship (1): 2014

Templenoe

- Kerry Intermediate Football Championship (1) 2019
- Munster Intermediate Club Football Championship (1) 2019
- Kerry Junior Football Championship (1) 2015
- Munster Junior Club Football Championship (1) 2015
- All-Ireland Junior Club Football Championship (1) 2016
- Kerry Novice Football Championship (1) 2013

Kenmare District Team

- Kerry Senior Football Championship Runner-Up 2016
- Kerry Under-21 Football Championship Winner 2017

University College Cork

- Sigerson Cup (1) 2019
