= Colette Swift =

Irish road cyclist

Personal information
- Born: 28 July 1973 (age 53) Ireland

Cycling career
- Sport: Cycling
- Discipline: Road cycling

Colette Swift (born 28 July 1973) is a former road cyclist from Ireland. She represented her nation at the 2004 UCI Road World Championships.
