= John Higgins (Gaelic footballer) =

Irish Gaelic footballer

Personal information
- Native name: Seán Ó hUiginn (Irish)
- Born: 1963 (age 62–63) Tralee, County Kerry, Ireland

Sport
- Sport: Gaelic football
- Position: Left wing-back
Club
- Years: Club
- John Mitchels
Club titles
- Kerry titles: 0
Inter-county
- Years: County
- 1983-1987: Kerry
Inter-county titles
- Munster titles: 3
- All-Irelands: 3
- NFL: 1
- All Stars: 0

John Higgins (born 1963) is an Irish retired Gaelic footballer. His league and championship career with the Kerry senior teams lasted four seasons from 1983 until 1987.

Higgins first appeared on the inter-county scene when he was selected for the Kerry minor team in 1981. He later won a Munster medal with the Kerry under-21 team, before making his senior debut during the 1983-84 league. Over the course of the following four seasons he won three successive All-Ireland medals as a non-playing substitute between 1984 and 1986. He also won three successive Munster medals and one National League medal. Higgins played his last game for Kerry in June 1987.

== Honours ==
Kerry

- All-Ireland Senior Football Championship (3): 1984, 1985, 1986
- Munster Senior Football Championship (3): 1984, 1985, 1986
- National Football League (1): 1984-84
- Munster Under-21 Football Championship (1): 1983
