= Mick Kennedy (Gaelic footballer) =

Dublin Gaelic footballer

Personal information
- Native name: Mícheál Ó Cinnéide (Irish)
- Born: 1958 (age 67–68) Finglas, County Dublin, Ireland
- Occupation: Driver
- Height: 6 ft 0 in (183 cm)

Sport
- Sport: Gaelic football
- Position: Left wing-forward
Club
- Years: Club
- St Margaret's
Club titles
- Dublin titles: 0
Inter-county
- Years: County
- 1979–1992: Dublin
Inter-county titles
- Leinster titles: 6
- All-Irelands: 1
- NFL: 2
- All Stars: 1

Michael J. Kennedy (born 1958) is an Irish former Gaelic footballer who played for the St Margaret's club and at inter-county level with the Dublin senior football team.

== Career ==
Kennedy first played Gaelic football at juvenile and underage levels with the St Margaret's club. He was still eligible for the minor grade when he was promoted to the club's senior team, but enjoyed little in terms of success.

Kennedy first appeared on the inter-county scene for Dublin as a member of the minor team. He won a Leinster MFC medal in 1976, however, his subsequent three-year spell with the under-21 team without success. Kennedy joined the senior team in 1979 and won the first of six Leinster SFC medals that year before losing the All-Ireland final to Kerry. In all, he made five All-Ireland final appearances, with victory coming on one occasion against Galway in 1983. Kennedy also won a Railway Cup medal with Leinster in 1988, the same year he was named as the All-Star left corner-back.

== Honours ==
Dublin

- All-Ireland Senior Football Championship: 1983
- Leinster Senior Football Championship: 1979, 1983, 1984, 1985, 1989, 1992
- National Football League: 1986–87, 1990–91
- Leinster Minor Football Championship: 1976
