= Pat Canavan =

Dublin Gaelic footballer

Personal information
- Native name: Pádraig Ó Ceannubháin (Irish)
- Nickname: Whac
- Born: c. 1960 Ireland

Sport
- Sport: Gaelic football
- Position: ?
Club
- Years: Club
- St Vincent's
Inter-county
- Years: County
- ?–?: Dublin
Inter-county titles
- Leinster titles: 1
- All-Irelands: 1

Pat Canavan (born c. 1960) is a former Gaelic footballer who played for the Dublin county team. Canavan won an all-Ireland medal for Dublin in 1983 in the final against Galway.
