= 1983–84 National Football League (Ireland) =

Gaelic football competition

League details
- Dates: October 1983 – 29 April 1984

League champions
- Winners: Kerry (15th win)
- Captain: Diarmuid O'Donoghue
- Manager: Mick O'Dwyer

League runners-up
- Runners-up: Galway

The 1983–84 National Football League was the 53rd staging of the National Football League (NFL), an annual Gaelic football tournament for the Gaelic Athletic Association county teams of Ireland.

Kerry defeated Galway in the final, and Mikey Sheehy scored 1-5.

== Format ==
Four divisions of 8 teams: each team plays all the other teams in its division once, earning 2 points for a win and 1 for a draw. Tie-breakers are played to separate teams (if necessary for promotion, relegation or knockout places).

The top two teams in Divisions 2, 3 and 4 are promoted. The bottom two teams in Divisions 1, 2 and 3 are relegated.

The NFL title is awarded after a knockout stage. Eight teams progress to the quarter-finals:

- Teams placed 1st, 2nd, 3rd and 4th in Division 1
- Teams placed 1st and 2nd in Division 2
- Teams placed 1st in Division 3 and 4

== Results ==
=== Division One ===
==== Play-Off ====
26 February 1984 For 4th Place	Cork	0-20 — 4-4 a.e.t	Armagh	Athlone
				Referee: P Kavanagh, Meath

26 February 1984 For 6th Place	Offaly	0-10 — 1-7	Kildare	Carlow
				Referee: P Collins, Westmeath

==== Table ====
Team	Pld	W	D	L	Pts	Status
Kerry	7	3	4	0	10	Qualified for knockout stage
Down	7	3	2	2	8	Qualified for knockout stage
Meath	7	3	2	2	8	Qualified for knockout stage
Cork	7	3	1	3	7	Qualified for knockout stage
Armagh	7	3	1	3	7
Offaly	7	3	4	4	6
Kildare	7	2	2	3	6	Relegated to Division Two of the 1984–85 NFL
Dublin	7	1	2	4	4	Relegated to Division Two of the 1984–85 NFL

=== Division Two ===
==== Play-Off ====
26 February 1984 For 3rd Place	Roscommon	1-11 — 1-7	Mayo	McHale Park, Castlebar
				Referee: T Moran, Leitrim

4 March 1984 For 2nd Place	Tyrone	1-6 — 0-8	Roscommon	Breffni Park, Cavan

==== Table ====
Team	Pld	W	D	L	Pts	Notes
Galway	7	7	0	0	14	Qualified for Knockout Phase and promoted to Division One of the 1984–85 NFL
Tyrone	7	4	0	3	8	Qualified for Knockout Phase and promoted to Division One of the 1984–85 NFL
Roscommon	7	4	0	3	8
Mayo	7	4	0	3	8
Wexford	7	3	1	3	7
Louth	7	3	0	4	6
Cavan	7	2	1	4	5	Relegated to Division Three of the 1983–84 NFL
Derry	7	0	0	7	0	Relegated to Division Three of the 1983–84 NFL

=== Division Three ===
==== Table ====
Team	Pld	W	D	L	Pts	Notes
Monaghan	7	6	0	1	12	Qualified for Knockout Phase and promoted to Division Two of the 1984–85 NFL
Donegal	7	5	0	2	10	Promoted to Division Two of the 1984–85 NFL
Wicklow	7	4	1	2	9
Antrim	7	3	2	2	8
Clare	7	3	0	4	6
Laois	7	2	1	4	5
Carlow	7	1	1	5	3	Relegated to Division Four of the 1984–85 NFL
Westmeath	7	1	1	5	3	Relegated to Division Four of the 1984–85 NFL

=== Division Four ===
==== Table ====
Team	Pld	W	D	L	Pts	Notes
Longford	7	7	0	0	14	Qualified for Knockout Phase and promoted to Division Three of the 1984–85 NFL
Leitrim	7	6	0	1	12	Promoted to Division Three of the 1984–85 NFL
Limerick	7	4	0	3	8
Fermanagh	7	4	0	3	8
Waterford	7	3	0	4	6
Sligo	7	3	0	4	6
Tipperary	7	1	0	6	2
Kilkenny	7	0	0	7	0

== Knockout Phase ==
=== Quarter-finals ===
4 March 1984

Kerry	2-11 – 2-5	Longford

Pearse Park, Longford

11 March 1984

Galway	1-7 – 0-7	Cork

Gaelic Grounds, Limerick

11 March 1984

Meath	1-12 – 1-7	Monaghan

Breffni Park, Cavan

11 March 1984

Down	2-8 – 0-6	Tyrone

Lurgan

=== Semi-finals ===
1 April 1984

Kerry	0-12 – 1-6	Down

Croke Park, Dublin

1 April 1984

Galway	1-10 – 0-13	Meath

Croke Park, Dublin

15 April 1984
replay

Galway	0-10 – 0-9	Meath

Croke Park, Dublin
Attendance: 13,777

=== Finals ===
29 April 1984

Kerry	1-11 – 0-11	Galway
Mikey Sheehy 1-5; Jack O'Shea 0-3; Tommy Doyle, Eoin Liston, Willie Maher 0-1 each

Gaelic Grounds, Limerick
Referee: Paddy Collins (Westmeath)
