= 2013 All-Ireland Minor Football Championship =

Gaelic football competition

All-Ireland Minor Football Championship 2013
Championship details
- Dates: April – 22 September 2013
- Teams: 34

All-Ireland Champions

Provincial Champions

Championship statistics
- No. matches played: 45
- Goals total: 1
- Points total: 1

The 2013 All-Ireland Minor Football Championship is the premier "knockout" competition for under-18 competitors who play the game of Gaelic football in Ireland. The games are organised by the Gaelic Athletic Association. The 2013 series of games started in May with the majority of the games played during the summer months. The All-Ireland Minor Football Final took place on 22 September in Croke Park, Dublin, preceding the Senior Game. In 2013 the title sponsor is Electric Ireland. Mayo won the title after a 2–13 to 1–13 win against Tyrone.

== Results & Fixtures ==
=== Munster Minor Football Championship ===
7 July 2013 Final	Kerry	0-15 – 0-10	Tipperary	Fitzgerald Stadium, Killarney
12:00 PM				Referee: James Bermingham Cork

=== Ulster Minor Football Championship ===
21 July 2013 Final	Monaghan	4-10 – 2-14	Tyrone	St Tiernach's Park, Clones
12:00 PM

=== Connacht Minor Football Championship ===
22 June 2013 Quarter-final	Mayo	1-15 – 1-05	Leitrim	Dr. Hyde Park, Roscommon
12:00 PM

22 June 2013 Semi-final	Roscommon	1-12 – 1-05	Sligo	Dr. Hyde Park, Roscommon
12:00 PM

29 June 2013 Semi-final	Mayo	5-08 – 2-11	Galway	Dr. Hyde Park, Roscommon
7:00 PM

20 July 2013 Final	Mayo	3-7 – 1-10	Roscommon	McHale Park, Castlebar
12:00 PM				Referee: Ray McBrienLeitrim

=== Leinster Minor Football Championship ===
14 July 2013 Final	Kildare	2-15 – 2-07	Westmeath	Croke Park, Dublin
1:00 PM		Lively Lillies End 22 Year Wait – Hoganstand		Referee: David Gough Meath

=== All Ireland Series ===
==== All Ireland Series Quarter-finals ====
4 August 2013 Quarter-final 1	Tyrone	0-17 – 1-12	Kerry	Croke Park, Dublin
12:00 PM

5 August 2013 Quarter-final 2	Mayo	2-13 – 0-8	Westmeath	O'Connor Park, Tullamore
1:15 PM

5 August 2013 Quarter-final 3	Monaghan	0-12 – 0-9	Tipperary	Pearse Park (Longford), Longford
3:00 PM

5 August 2013 Quarter-final 4	Roscommon	3-8 – 0-12	Kildare	O'Connor Park, Tullamore
4:00 PM

==== All Ireland Series Semi-finals ====
25 August 2013 Semi-final	Mayo	3-19 – 1-12	Monaghan	Croke Park, Dublin
1:30 PM		Mayo Crush Monaghan		Referee: Anthony Nolan Wicklow

1 September 2013 Semi-final	Tyrone	1-12 – 0-13	Roscommon	Croke Park, Dublin
1:30 PM		Battling Tyrone Advance		Referee: Derek O'Mahoney Tipperary

==== All Ireland Minor Football Final ====
22 September 2013 Final	Mayo	2-13 – 1-13	Tyrone	Croke Park, Dublin
1:35 PM		Joy For Mayo Minors as Famine Ends in Style		Referee: Conor Lane Cork
