= Templenoe GAA =

Gaelic games club in County Kerry, Ireland

Templenoe
- CLG Teampall Nua
- Founded: 1933
- County: Kerry
- Colours: Blue and white
- Grounds: Dromore, Kenmare, County Kerry
- Coordinates: 51°51′42.74″N 9°41′11.45″W

Playing kits
Standard colours

Templenoe GAA (Irish: CLG Teampall Nua) is a Gaelic Athletic Association club from Templenoe in County Kerry, Ireland. The club competes as a joint divisional side with other clubs from the Kenmare area like Tuosist GAA in the county championship and as an individual club in other competitions. Hurling was by far the stronger of the two codes until the 1920s. However, since then Gaelic football has taken pride of place and hurling is no longer played in the club. The club was founded in 1933 but did not affiliate to the GAA until 1938.

== History ==
The first club meeting was held in 1933 in the Merino House. Dan O'Reilly became the club's first chairman and P.D.M. O'Sullivan became the first secretary. Joe O'Neill was elected treasurer that day and stayed treasurer until 1966. In 1958 Templenoe merged with another Templenoe club from the Blackwater area, which was founded in 1942.

The club played in the 1903 Kerry Senior Hurling Championship. In their only outing they suffered a big loss to Tralee Celtic.

Templenoe did not have its own pitch until 1954 when they acquired a field. In the 1970s they leveled this field and dressing rooms and toilets were added in 1991. The club had many victories over the years in Kenmare district board competitions but the highlight of the playing successes was the winning the Kerry Novice Football Championship in 1973 and the Kerry Junior Football Championship in 1975. Nine Templenoe players won Senior Kerry County Championship medals with Kenmare District in 1974.

== Finnegan Cup ==
The 4 clubs in the Kenmare District play for the Finnegan Cup in the Kenmare district board championship. The Kenmare District is the smallest such district in Kerry. The 4 clubs are Templenoe GAA, Tuosist GAA, Kenmare GAA and Kilgarvan GAA.

== Achievements ==
- Kerry Intermediate Football Championship (1) - 2019 (Runners-Up in 1988, 2016, 2017)
- Munster Intermediate Club Football Championship Winners (1) - 2019
- Kerry Junior Football Championship (2) - 1975, 2015
- Munster Junior Club Football Championship (1) - 2015
- All-Ireland Junior Club Football Championship (1) - 2016
- Kerry Novice Football Championship (2) - 1973, 2013
- Co. Novice shield champions: (3) - 2002, 2005, 2010
- Kerry County Senior Football League Division 2 Winners - 2015
- Kerry County Senior Football League Division 3 Winners - 2014
- Kerry County Senior Football League Division 4 Winners - 1994, 2012
- Kerry County Senior Football League Division 5 Winners - 1993, 2011

== Notable players ==
- Pat Spillane Eight time All-Ireland Senior Football Championship winner. Nine time All-Star winner. Two time Texaco Footballer of the Year 1978, 1986. Gaelic football – Team of the Century and Team of the Millennium.
- Mick Spillane Seven time All-Ireland Senior Football Championship winner.
- Tom Spillane Four time All-Ireland Senior Football Championship winner. Three time All-Star winner.
- Killian Spillane Two times All-Ireland Senior Football Championship winner. 2017 All-Ireland Junior Football Championship winning captain.
- Adrian Spillane 2022 All-Ireland Senior Football Championship winner.
- Tadhg Morley Two times All-Ireland Senior Football Championship winner. All-Star winner.
