= Pat Spillane =

Kerry Gaelic footballer and broadcaster

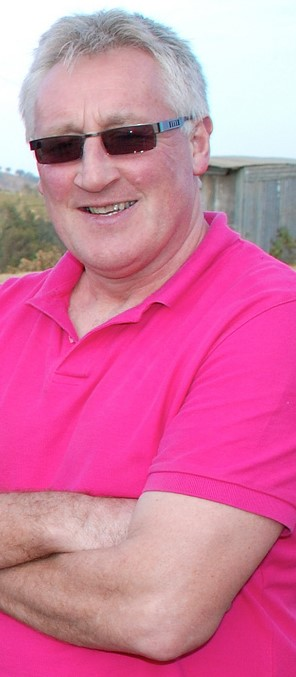
- Spillane in 2012

Personal information
- Native name: Pádraig Ó Spealáin (Irish)
- Born: Patrick Gerard Spillane; 1 December 1955 (age 70) Templenoe, County Kerry, Ireland
- Occupation: Retired secondary school principal
- Height: 6 ft 0 in (183 cm)

Sport
- Sport: Gaelic football
- Position: Left-half forward
Club
- Years: Club
- Templenoe
Club titles
- Kerry titles: 2
- Munster titles: 1
- All-Ireland Titles: 1
Inter-county
Years	County	Apps (scores)
1974–1991	Kerry	56 (19–123)
Inter-county titles
- Munster titles: 12
- All-Irelands: 8
- NFL: 2
- All Stars: 9

Patrick Gerard Spillane (born 1 December 1955), better known as Pat Spillane, is an Irish former Gaelic football pundit and player. His league and championship career at senior level with the Kerry county team spanned seventeen years from 1974 to 1991. Spillane is widely regarded as one of the greatest players in the history of the game.

Born in Templenoe, County Kerry, Spillane was born into a strong Gaelic football family. His father, Tom, and his uncle, Jerome, both played with Kerry and won All-Ireland medals in the junior grade. His maternal uncles, Jackie, Dinny, Mickey, and Teddy Lyne, all won All-Ireland medals at various grades with Kerry throughout the 1940s and 1950s.

Spillane played competitive Gaelic football as a boarder at St Brendan's College. Here, he won back-to-back Corn Uí Mhuirí medals, however, an All-Ireland medal remained elusive. Spillane first appeared for the Templenoe club at underage levels, before winning a county novice championship medal in 1973. With the amalgamated Kenmare District team, he won two county senior championship medals in 1974 and 1987. While studying at Thomond College, Spillane won an All-Ireland medal in the club championship in 1978. He also won one Munster medal and a county senior championship medal in Limerick.

Spillane made his debut on the inter-county scene at the age of sixteen when he was picked on the Kerry minor team. He enjoyed two championship seasons with the minor team, however, he was a Munster runner-up on both occasions. Spillane subsequently joined the Kerry under-21 team, winning back-to-back All-Ireland medals in 1975 and 1976. By this stage, he had also joined the Kerry senior team, making his debut during the 1973–74 league. Over the course of the next seventeen years, Spillane won eight All-Ireland medals, beginning with a lone triumph in 1975, a record-equalling four championships in a row from 1978 to 1981 and three championships in a row from 1984 to 1986. He also won twelve Munster medals, two National Football League medals and was named Footballer of the Year in 1978 and 1986. He played his last game for Kerry in August 1991. Spillane was joined on the Kerry team by his two brothers, Mick and Tom, and together won a total of 19 All-Ireland medals – a record for a set of brothers.

After being chosen on the Munster inter-provincial team for the first time in 1976, Spillane was an automatic choice on the starting fifteen for the following six years. During that time, he won four Railway Cup medals.

In retirement from playing, Spillane combined his teaching career with a new position as a sports broadcaster. His media career began with RTÉ in 1992, where he started as a co-commentator before progressing to the role of studio analyst with the flagship programme The Sunday Game. He also enjoyed a four-year tenure as host of the evening highlights edition of the programme. Spillane also writes a weekly column for the Sunday World. On 9 July 2022, he announced that the 2022 All-Ireland Football final would be his last appearance as a pundit on The Sunday Game.

Even during his playing days, Spillane came to be recognised as one of the greatest players of all time. After fighting his way back from a potentially career-ending anterior cruciate ligament injury, he was named in the right wing-forward position on the Football Team of the Century in 1984. Spillane was one of only two players from the modern era to be named on that team. He switched to the left-wing forward position when he was named on the Football Team of the Millennium in 1999. Spillane's collection of nine All-Stars is a record for a Gaelic footballer, while his tally of eight All-Ireland medals is also a record which he shares with several other players.

== Biography ==
Born in Templenoe, County Kerry, Spillane arrived into a family steeped in Gaelic football history. His father, Tom Snr (1923–1964), played Gaelic football with Kerry and won a Munster title in 1948. A number of maternal uncles (his mother was bred by the Lyne Family of Killarney's Legion) also had the distinction of representing their county in football. His mother's name was Maura.

When Spillane was an eight-year-old, his father died, leaving his mother to take over the running of the family pub while simultaneously raising a family of four children. Spillane was educated at the local national school and later attended St Brendan's College in Killarney, where one of his best friends was future Kerry teammate Páidí Ó Sé. At St Brendan's, his football skills were developed. He played senior football with Brendan's but lost both an All-Ireland Colleges' semi-final and a final.

Spillane subsequently attended Thomond College in Limerick, where he studied to be a P.E. teacher. He was later joined by his brother Mick at Thomond and they both played on the college football team. In the late 1980s, Spillane took over the running of the family pub in Templenoe. He worked as a P.E. and geography teacher at St. Gobán's College in Bantry, County Cork, where he became vice-principal and, subsequently, principal of the school in 2011. He also led the school's under-16 boys team to two 'Munsters' in a row in 2005–06 and 2006–07; both finals were played on Kerry soil against Limerick opposition. As a result of the Croke Park Agreement, he retired as principal in 2012 to secure his right to a pension, but expressed regret at feeling forced to do so. He subsequently chaired CEDRA, the Commission for the Economic Development of Rural Areas, an organisation tasked with creating jobs in rural parts of the country until 2025.

Spillane lives in Templenoe with his wife Rosarii, and three children, Cara (born 1990), Shóna born (1992), and Pat Jnr (born 1997). He still helps to train his local teams. Pat Jnr has played for the Sligo county team since 2022.

Spillane took over his mother's bar, renaming it Pat Spillane's Bar, and he ran it before leasing it. Spillane's footballer brother Tom Jnr bought the pub from Pat in the late 2010s, with the intention of running it alongside his sons Killian and Adrian (also Kerry footballers).

== Playing career ==
=== Club ===
Spillane played his club football with the local club in Templenoe. He won a county novice championship with the club in 1973, before collecting a county junior championship winners' medal in 1975.

Spillane also played club football with Thomond College during his time there in the late 1970s. In 1977, he was captain of the side that defeated Croom to take the Limerick senior championship title. Thomond later represented the county in the provincial club series and even reached the final. A 0–12 to 1–3 defeat of the famous Nemo Rangers club gave Spillane a Munster club winners' medal. He later led his team out in Croke Park for the All-Ireland final against St. John's of Antrim. The Limerick club had no Limerick native on the team, however, victory was secured thanks to goals by Spillane and Sligo's Mick Kilcoyne. The 2–14 to 1–3 victory gave Spillane an All-Ireland club winners' medal.

=== Minor & under-21 ===
By the early 1970s, Spillane had joined the Kerry minor football team, however, he had no success in this grade as Cork dominated the provincial championship. He quickly progressed onto the Kerry under-21 team where he captured a Munster title in 1975, following a nine-point trouncing of Waterford. Spillane's side later qualified for the All-Ireland final with Dublin providing the opposition. A 1–15 to 0–10 score line gave Kerry the victory and gave Spillane an All-Ireland winners' medal.

In 1976, Spillane made it two Munster under-21 titles in a row, as Kerry retained their provincial crown at the expense of Cork. He later lined out in a second All-Ireland final. Kildare provided the opposition on that occasion, however, they were no match for Kerry. Spillane collected a second All-Ireland winners' medal following a 0–14 to 1–3 victory.

=== Senior ===
Spillane made his senior inter-county debut as a substitute in a National Football League game against Galway in March 1974. He lined out in the drawn National League final that year; however, he did not start the replay which Kerry won. Spillane retained his place as a substitute for Kerry's unsuccessful Munster Championship campaign.

In 1975, a new-look Kerry team was formed under the management of former player Mick O'Dwyer. It was the beginning of a glorious era for Kerry football and Spillane played a key role in orchestrating much of the success for the team that would come to be regarded as the greatest of all time. That year, he won his first senior Munster title, dethroning Cork as provincial champions in the process. Spillane later lined out in his first senior All-Ireland final. Reigning champions Dublin provided the opposition and were installed as the red-hot favourites over the youngest Kerry team of all time. On a rain-soaked day John Egan and substitute Ger O'Driscoll scored two goals and the Dubs were ambushed by 2–12 to 0–11. It was Spillane's first All-Ireland winners' medal at senior level. Because team captain Mickey O'Sullivan had left injured in the first half, Spillane, at the age of nineteen, was given the task of accepting the Sam Maguire Cup on the Hogan Stand.

In 1976, Spillane captured his second Munster title, before later lining out in his second All-Ireland final. Once again, it was Dublin who provided the opposition. Both sides were hoping for success, however, new Dub Kevin Moran was causing havoc with the Kerry defence. Jimmy Keaveney converted a penalty to help Dublin to a 3–8 to 0–10 victory and defeat for Spillane.

1977 proved to be another frustrating year. The year began with Spillane capturing a first National League medal on the field of play and a third consecutive Munster title following another win over Cork. Kerry later took on Dublin for the third consecutive year, however, this time it was in the All-Ireland semi-final. In one of the greatest games of football ever-played, the Dubs triumphed and Spillane was still left waiting for a second All-Ireland medal.

In 1978, Kerry faced little competition in the provincial championship once again. A defeat of Cork gave Spillane a fourth Munster winners' medal in a row. Kerry later qualified for a third All-Ireland final in four years. Old rivals Dublin provided the opposition, however, the game turned into a rout. The game is chiefly remembered for Mikey Sheehy's sensational goal. The Kerry forward lobbed the ball over the head of Paddy Cullen, who was caught off his line arguing with the referee. New full-forward Eoin Liston scored a hat-trick of goals. Spillane played all over the field, including goalkeeper after Charlie Nelligan was sent off. At the full-time whistle, Kerry were the winners by 5–11 to 0–9.

In 1979, Kerry made it five-in-a-row in Munster as Cork fell by ten points in the provincial final. Spillane later went in search of a third All-Ireland medal as he lined out in a fourth championship decider. Dublin provided the opposition for the fifth consecutive occasion. Kerry were handicapped throughout the game. Ger Power did not start the game, while John O'Keeffe got injured and Páidí Ó Sé was sent off during the encounter. Two goals by Mikey Sheehy and a third by John Egan helped 'the Kingdom' to a 3–13 to 1–8 victory. It was Spillane's third All-Ireland winners' medal.

Kerry's dominance continued in 1980. Another defeat of Cork in the provincial final gave Spillane a sixth Munster winners' medal in succession. Another All-Ireland final appearance beckoned, this time with Roscommon providing the opposition. The Connacht champions shocked Kerry and took a five-point lead inside the first twelve minutes. Mikey Sheehy popped up again to score the decisive goal, as Kerry went on to claim a 1–9 to 1–6 victory in a game that contained sixty-four frees. The victory gave Kerry a third All-Ireland title in succession, while Spillane added a fourth All-Ireland winners' medal to his ever-growing collection. Kerry had succeeded in winning 3 in a row.

In 1981, Spillane won his seventh consecutive Munster title; however, he later damaged his knee in a club game in August of that year. His movement was severely hampered, but he was still selected as a substitute for the All-Ireland final against Offaly. Spillane was brought on with only a few minutes left in the match and he captured his fifth All-Ireland winners' medal on the field of play, as Kerry won by 1–12 to 0–8.

Spillane played sporadically for Kerry in 1982, as the team attempted to capture an unprecedented fifth All-Ireland medal in a row. He played no part in Kerry's eighth consecutive Munster final victory over Cork, however, he did return for a second consecutive All-Ireland final against Offaly. Kerry had the upper hand for much of the game and were leading by two points with two minutes left to be played. The game, however, was not over as Offaly substitute Séamus Darby, who had entered the game almost unnoticed, produced the most spectacular of finishes by scoring a late goal. Kerry failed to score again to level the match and Offaly went on to win their third All-Ireland title ever. Kerry's five-in-a-row dream was shattered.

Spillane played no part in the 1983 championship, as he was recovering from an operation on his snapped cruciate ligament. While many players would never play again following such an injury Spillane fought his way back to fitness in time to win his second National League medal and his eighth Munster title in 1984. The centenary-year All-Ireland final pitted Kerry against old rivals and reigning champions Dublin. The Kingdom dominated the game from start to finish. Only two Dublin forwards scored as Kerry ran out easy winners by 0–14 to 1–6. It was Spillane's sixth All-Ireland winners' medal.

Kerry made no mistake again in 1985. A two-goal victory over Cork gave Spillane a ninth Munster winners' medal. Another All-Ireland final beckoned, with Dublin providing the opposition for a second consecutive year. Jack O'Shea scored a key goal after eleven minutes and Kerry stormed to a nine-point lead at half-time. The Dubs came storming back with Joe McNally scoring two goals. The gap could not be bridged and Kerry won by 2–1 to 2–8. The victory gave Spillane a record-equalling seventh All-Ireland winners' medal.

In 1986, Kerry's dominance showed no sign of disappearing. Cork fell again in the provincial final, giving Spillane an 11th Munster title. A tenth All-Ireland final appearance quickly followed and it turned out to be an historic occasion. Tyrone provided the opposition in their first-ever championship decider. A Peter Quinn goal gave the Ulster men a six-point lead in the second half, however, the game was far from over. Spillane ran fifty yards up the field for a hand-passed goal to get Kerry back on track. Mikey Sheehy scored a second goal to give the Kingdom a 2–15 to 1–10 victory. Spillane was named man of the match as he collected a third All-Ireland medal in a row. It was his eighth All-Ireland medal overall, a record haul of All-Ireland medals and a record that he shares with several other players. For the last trio of All-Ireland victories Spillane was joined by his two brothers, Mick and Tom, on the Kerry team.

The glory days were now over for Kerry as Cork captured the next four Munster titles. Spillane continued to play with Kerry, winning his 12th Munster title in 1991. Kerry were subsequently defeated by eventual champions Down in the All-Ireland semi-final and Spillane decided to retire from inter-county football.

=== Inter-provincial ===
Spillane also lined out with Munster in the inter-provincial football competition and enjoyed much success. He first lined out with his province in 1976, as Munster defeated Leinster by 2–15 to 2–8. It was his first Railway Cup winners' medal and the first of three-in-a-row for Spillane and for Munster. After losing out in 1979 and 1980, Spillane captured a fourth and final Railway Cup title in 1981.

=== International ===
Spillane's career also included four appearances with Ireland in the International Rules series. He scored a point in the opening game against Australia in 1986. Ireland went on to win the series 2–1. Spillane was back on the team again in 1987. This time, he lined out in all three games of the series. He scored ten points in the final game at Croke Park; however, Australia were victorious on that occasion.

== Records ==
Spillane made and broke a number of records during his football career. In 1986, Spillane and his three Kerry teammates broke Danno O'Keeffe's long-standing record by capturing an unprecedented eighth All-Ireland winners' medal. His inter-county football career, which spanned three decades, saw him earn a record nine All-Star awards, more than any other player in the history of the game. Spillane shares this record of nine All-Star wins with Kilkenny hurlers Henry Shefflin, D. J. Carey, Tommy Walsh and Eddie Keher (although Keher's record is made up of 5 All-Stars and 4 Cú Chulainn Awards). His All-Star accolades were presented as part of a six-in-a-row from 1976 until 1981 and a three-in-a-row from 1984 until 1986. Spillane is also one of only a handful of players to have won senior Munster winners' medals in each of three separate decades.

Spillane was presented with the Texaco Footballer of the Year award on two occasions, the first in 1978 and the second in 1984. His second win was all the more remarkable considering he had battled back from a career-threatening injury. Also in 1984, the GAA's centenary year, Spillane was singled out as one of the greatest players of all-time when he was chosen in the left wing-forward position on the Football Team of the Century. He retained this position on the Football Team of the Millennium in 1999.

The three Spillane brothers – Pat, Tom and Mick – hold the record number of All-Ireland senior winners' medals in either hurling or football with nineteen. Including medals won as non-playing substitutes Pat won eight, Mick won seven and Tom won four.

== Media career ==
Following retirement from Gaelic football, Spillane developed a career in the media. He joined The Sunday Game team as a co-commentator in 1992, before later working as a studio analyst. For a brief time, Spillane presented The Sunday Game highlights programme during the summer months until 2009. On 9 July 2022, Spillane announced his retirement as a pundit on The Sunday Game, after three decades and that the 2022 All-Ireland Football final would be his last appearance. He appeared as a guest on The Late Late Show at the earliest available opportunity on 2 September to speak about this.

As an analyst of games, Spillane has often expressed his disdain for Ulster football teams, particularly those of Armagh, Tyrone and, latterly, Donegal. In 2003, he described Armagh's and Tyrone's style of defence as puke football. This led him to another appearance on Reeling in the Years, following on from most of the 1970s and 1980s. Latterly, Spillane has mocked Tyrone's GPS trackers, referring to the devices as "bras."

In 2011, Spillane aired his views of the Donegal senior football team, he branded their style of play "shite football". After Donegal's Ulster Senior Football Championship defeat of Antrim in May 2011, Spillane was critical on The Sunday Game of Ryan Bradley, scorer of two points in his first Ulster start, being in receipt of the man-of-the-match award. Spillane said Bradley was "the best of a bad bunch" and didn't deserve the award at all, causing Donegal manager Jim McGuinness to react furiously. McGuinness called Spillane's comments "way over the top".

Spillane has a weekly column in the Sunday World newspaper.

Spillane has appeared as himself in an episode of the Irish soap opera Fair City.

== Career statistics ==
Team	Season	National League			Munster		All-Ireland		Total	
Team	Season	Division	Apps	Score	Apps	Score	Apps	Score	Apps	Score
Kerry	1973–74	Division 1A	3	0-03	0	0-00	0	0-00	3	0-03
Kerry	1974–75	Division 1A	5	0-04	2	1-04	2	1-04	9	2–12
Kerry	1975–76	Division 1A	6	1-08	3	2–10	2	0-04	11	3–22
Kerry	1976–77	Division 1 (South)	7	2-07	2	2-03	1	0-00	10	4–10
Kerry	1977–78	Division 1 (South)	4	0-03	2	2-09	2	1-03	8	3–15
Kerry	1978–79	Division 1 (South)	6	6-04	2	3-06	2	0-05	10	9–15
Kerry	1979–80	Division 1 (South)	8	1–11	1	0-05	2	2-03	11	3–19
Kerry	1980–81	Division 1	8	1–18	2	0-06	2	0-03	12	1–27
Kerry	1981–82	Division 1	2	0-01	1	0-04	2	0-01	5	0-06
Kerry	1982–83	Division 1	0	0-00	0	0-00	0	0-00	0	0-00
Kerry	1983–84	Division 1	5	0-03	2	2-04	2	0-07	9	2–14
Kerry	1984–85	Division 1	0	0-00	2	0-06	3	0-08	5	0–14
Kerry	1985–86	Division 1	3	1-07	2	1-02	2	1-06	7	3–15
Kerry	1986–87	Division 1	7	1-07	3	0-03	0	0-00	10	1–10
Kerry	1987–88	Division 1	7	0–16	2	1-07	0	0-00	9	1–23
Kerry	1988–89	Division 1	9	0-08	2	0-04	0	0-00	11	0–12
Kerry	1989–90	Division 1	0	0-00	2	0-02	0	0-00	2	0-02
Kerry	1990–91	Division 1	1	0-03	3	0-02	1	0-02	5	0-07
Total			81	13–103	33	14–77	23	5–46	137	32–226

== Honours ==
Templenoe

- Kerry Novice Football Championship:
  - Winner (1): 1973
- Kerry Junior Football Championship:
  - Winner (1): 1975

Kenmare District

- Kerry Senior Football Championship:
  - Winner (1): 1987

Thomond College

- All-Ireland Senior Club Football Championship:
  - Winner (1): 1978
- Munster Senior Club Football Championship:
  - Winner (1): 1977
- Limerick Senior Football Championship:
  - Winner (1): 1977

Kerry

- All-Ireland Senior Football Championship:
  - Winner (8): 1975, 1978, 1979, 1980, 1981, 1984, 1985, 1986
  - Runner-up (2): 1976, 1982
- Munster Senior Football Championship:
  - Winner (12): 1975, 1976, 1977, 1978, 1979, 1980, 1981, 1982 (sub), 1984, 1985, 1986, 1991
  - Runner-up (6): 1974 (sub), 1983, 1987, 1988, 1989, 1990
- National Football League:
  - Winner (4): 1973–74 (sub), 1976–77, 1981–82 (sub), 1983–84
  - Runner-up (2): 1979–80, 1986–87
- All-Ireland Under-21 Football Championship:
  - Winner (2): 1975, 1976
- Munster Under-21 Football Championship:
  - Winner (2): 1975, 1976

Munster

- Railway Cup:
  - Winner (4): 1976, 1977, 1978, 1981
  - Runner-up (2): 1979, 1980

Ireland

- International Rules:
  - Winner (1): 1986
  - Runner-up (1): 1987
- In May 2020, a public poll conducted by RTÉ.ie named Spillane in the half-forward line alongside Diarmuid Connolly and Peter Canavan in a team of footballers who had won All Stars during the era of The Sunday Game.
- Also in May 2020, the Irish Independent named Spillane at number two in its "Top 20 footballers in Ireland over the past 50 years".

== See also ==
- List of people on the postage stamps of Ireland

Awards
Preceded by Jimmy Keaveney (Dublin)	Texaco Footballer of the Year; 1978	Succeeded by Mikey Sheehy (Kerry)
Preceded by Jack O'Shea (Kerry)	Texaco Footballer of the Year; 1986	Succeeded by Brian Stafford (Meath)
