= Tommy Conroy (Dublin Gaelic footballer) =

Dublin Gaelic footballer

Personal information
- Native name: Tomás Ó Conaire (Irish)
- Nickname: Top Cat
- Born: 1963 (age 62–63) Dublin, Ireland
- Height: 1.85 m (6 ft 1 in)

Sport
- Sport: Gaelic football
- Position: Centre forward
Club
- Years: Club
- St Vincent's
Inter-county
- Years: County
- Dublin
Inter-county titles
- All-Irelands: 1
- All Stars: 1

Tommy Conroy (born c. 1963) is a former Gaelic footballer who played for the Dublin county team. He played a key role in Dublin's victory against Galway in the 1983 All-Ireland Senior Football Championship final. Top Cat won an All Star in 1985 after a particularly noteworthy season for both his club, St Vincent's, and for Dublin. He was part of the backroom staff for St Vincent's 2008 All-Ireland Club Championship-winning team and was the manager of the St Vincent's team that won the 2013 All-Ireland Club championship.
