= Templenoe =

Parish in County Kerry, Ireland

Coordinates: 51°52′N 9°41′W

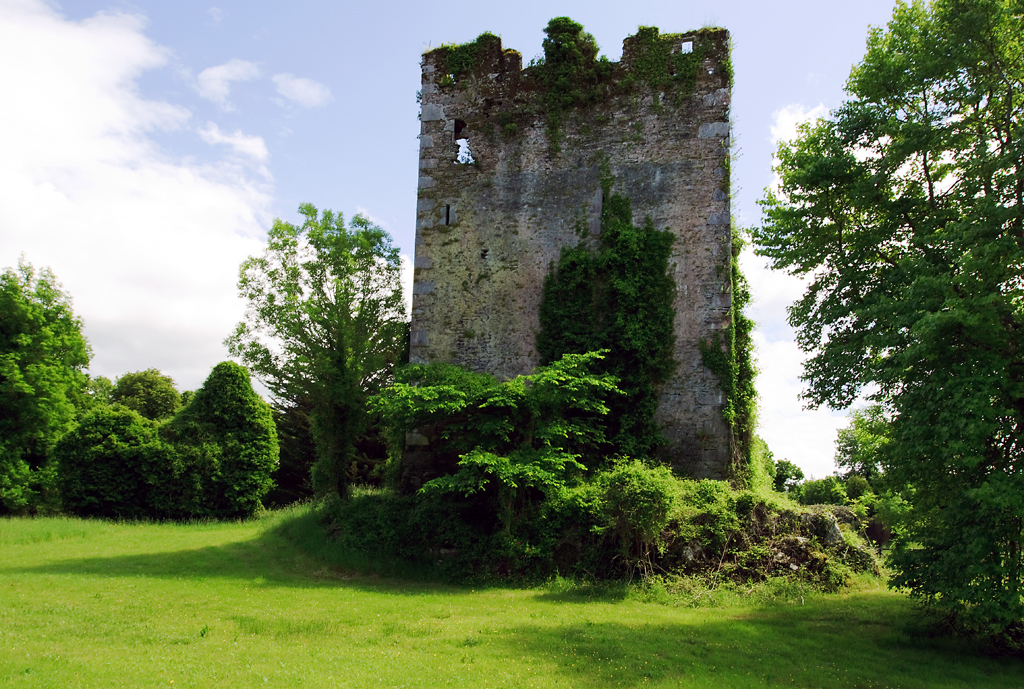
Dunkerron Castle is in Templenoe civil parish

Templenoe (Irish: An Teampall Nua, meaning 'new church') is a civil parish in County Kerry, Ireland. It is on the Iveragh Peninsula and includes part of Kenmare.

Templenoe village is the location of the Ring of Kerry golf club. There is a Gaelic Athletic Association ground, a pier, and a Catholic chapel of ease for the Kenmare parish. Dromore Castle, Dunkerron Castle and Dromquinna House are located in the area.

Templenoe GAA is the local Gaelic Athletic Association club. The Gaelic football-playing brothers of the County Kerry team, Pat Spillane, Mick Spillane and Tom Spillane, were each born in Templenoe.

== See also ==
- List of towns and villages in Ireland
