= Mick Spillane =

Kerry Gaelic footballer

Personal information
- Native name: Mícheál Ó Spealáin (Irish)
- Born: 8 January 1957 (age 69) Templenoe, County Kerry
- Occupation: Insurance Executive
- Height: 6 ft 0 in (183 cm)

Sport
- Sport: Gaelic football
- Position: Corner-back
Club
- Years: Club
- Templenoe
Club titles
- Kerry titles: 0
Inter-county
| Years | County | Apps (scores) |
| 1978–1987 | Kerry | 33 (0-00) |
Inter-county titles
- Munster titles: 7
- All-Irelands: 7
- NFL: 1
- All Stars: 1

Mick Spillane (born 8 January 1957) is an Irish former Gaelic footballer.

Born to Maura in Templenoe, County Kerry, he played for his local club Templenoe and at senior level for the Kerry county team in the 1970s and 1980s. He is a seven-time All-Ireland SFC winner.

Together with his brothers Pat and Tom, the Spillanes hold a record 19 All-Ireland medals between them.
