= 2008 Derry county football team season =

Derry
2008 season
- Chairman: Séamus McCloy
- Manager: Paddy Crozier
- National Football League: Winners
- Dr McKenna Cup: Final
- Ulster Championship: Semi-final
- All-Ireland Championship: Qualifiers Round 1
- Top goalscorer: League: Paddy Bradley (1-39); All: Paddy Bradley (3-71)

The following is a summary of Derry county football team's 2008 season. Details of the 2008 Derry club competitions are also shown.

== Dr McKenna Cup ==
Derry had a relatively successful 2008 Dr McKenna Cup, winning all three groups games and reaching the final, before losing to Down. Manager Paddy Crozier used the competition to try out young promising players, such as Enda Lynn, who won the TG4 Man of the Match award against Armagh on his inter-county debut. Paddy Bradley ended the competition as Derry's top scorer with 2-15.

=== Group games ===
6 January 2008
Round 1
Report: ,

Armagh	0-06 – 2-09	Derry
Brian Mallon 0-02, Stefan Forker 0-02 (0-02 frees), Gregory Loughran and Conor Clarke 0-01 each.		Seán Leo McGoldrick 2-00, Enda Lynn 0-03 (0-01 free), Enda Muldoon 0-02 (0-02 frees), Cathal O'Kane 0-02, Coilin Devlin and Ciarán Mullan 0-01 each.

Davitt Park, Lurgan
Attendance: ?
Referee: Con McReynolds (Down)
9 January 2008
Round 2
Report:

Derry	1-15 – 2-08	St. Mary's University College
Paddy Bradley 1-05 (0-03 frees), Ciarán Mullan 0-03 (0-01 free), Rian Kealey 0-02, Michael McBride, Niall McCusker, Cathal O'Kane, Enda Lynna and Coilin Devlin 0-01 each.		John Cunningham 1-00, Paul McAleer 1-00, Paul Carvill 0-04 (0-03 frees), Barry McGoldrick 0-02 (0-01 free), Gareth O'Neill 0-01, Michael Pollack 0-01 (0-01 free).

Shamrock Park, Ballinderry
Attendance: ?
Referee: Gregory Walsh (Antrim)
13 January 2008
Round 3
Report: ,

Derry	0-13 – 0-08	Fermanagh
Paddy Bradley 0-04 (0-03 frees), Raymond Wilkinson 0-03, Ciarán Mullan 0-02, Coilin Devlin 0-02 (0-02 frees), Rian Kealey and James Conway 0-01 each.		Matthew Keenan 0-04 (0-04 frees), Ronan McCabe 0-01 (0-01 free), Martin McGrath, Ciaran Lennon, Mark Little 0-01 each.

Watty Graham Park, Glen
Attendance: ?
Referee: Robbie O'Donnell (Donegal)

=== Semi-final ===
23 January 2008
Semi-final
Report: , ,

Derry	2-12 – 1-10	Fermanagh
Coilin Devlin 1-01, Raymond Wilkinson 1-00, Paddy Bradley 0-04, James Conway 0-02, Cathal O'Kane, Michael McBride, Seán Leo McGoldrick, Enda Lynn and Fergal Doherty 0-01 each.		Shaun Doherty 1-02, Matthew Keenan 0-03 (0-03 frees), Mark Little 0-02 (0-01 free), Eamon Maguire, Damian Kelly and Ryan Keenan 0-01 each.

Healy Park, Omagh
Attendance: ?
Referee: Martin Sludden (Tyrone)

=== Final ===
26 January 2008
Final
Report: , ,

Down	1-12 – 1-06	Derry
D Hughes 0-04, C Gribben 1-00, J Clarke 0-03, L Doyle 0-01 (0-01 free), J Fegan 0-01 (0-01 free), J Lynch, K McKernan and R Sexton 0-01 each.		Paddy Bradley 1-02 (0-01 free), Eoin Bradley 0-02, Rian Kealey 0-01, Enda Muldoon 0-01 (0-01 free).

Casement Park, Belfast
Attendance: 5,325
Referee: Michael Hughes (Tyrone)

== National Football League ==
Derry won the 2008 National League, their first League success since 1999/2000 and sixth in total. They finished top of the group stage standings and along with Kerry qualified for the final, played in Parnell Park. Derry defeated Kerry on a scoreline of 2-13 to 2-09, with Fergal Doherty grabbing the man of the match award. As in the McKenna Cup, Paddy Bradley ended the competition as Derry's top scorer with 1-39 (42). Indeed, this was third overall in Division 1, behind Kerry's Bryan Sheehan (1-41 (44)) and Galway's Michael Meehan (4-31 (43)).

=== Group games ===
2 February 2008
Round 1
Report: , , ,

Derry	2-09 – 1-09	Mayo
Paddy Bradley 0-05 (0-04 frees), Mark Lynch 1-01, Coilin Devlin 1-00, Ciarán Mullan 0-02 (0-01 free), Enda Muldoon 0-01.		Conor Mortimer 1-02 (0-01 free), Andy Moran 0-02, Alan Dillon 0-02 (0-02 frees), Austin O'Malley, Mickey Mullins and C Barrett 0-01 each.

Celtic Park, Derry
Attendance: ?
Referee: John Bannon (Longford)
16 February 2008
Round 2
Report: ,

Laois	1-09 – 2-12	Derry
Billy Sheehan 1-01, Michael Tierney 0-03 (0-02 frees), Colm Parkinson 0-02, Pauric Clancy, Ross Munnelly and John O'Loughlin 0-01 each.		Mark Lynch 1-02, Paddy Bradley 1-01 (0-01 free), Ciarán Mullan 0-04 (0-02 frees), Barry McGoldrick 0-02, Enda Muldoon, Coilin Devlin and James Conway 0-01 each.

O'Moore Park, Portlaoise
Attendance: ?
Referee: Pat McEnaney (Monaghan)
2 March 2008
Round 3
Report: ,

Kerry	0-10 – 0-09	Derry
Bryan Sheehan 0-06 (0-03 frees, 0-01 ‘45’), Darren O'Sullivan, Sean O'Sullivan, Kieran Donaghy and Paul O'Connor 0-01 each.		Paddy Bradley 0-05 (0-01 free), Enda Muldoon 0-02 (0-01 free, 0-01 ‘45’), James Conway and Liam Hinphey 0-01 each.

FitzGerald Stadium, Killarney
Attendance: ?
Referee: Michael Collins (Cork)
15 March 2008
Round 4
Report: , ,

Derry	1-16 – 0-08	Kildare
Paddy Bradley 0-09 (0-05 frees), Mark Lynch 1-00, Conleith Gilligan 0-02, Barry McGoldrick 0-01 (0-01 free), Liam Hinphey, James Conway, Enda Muldoon and Ciarán Mullan 0-01 each.		John Doyle 0-04 (0-04 frees), J Kavanagh 0-02, M Conway 0-01 (0-01 '45'), M O'Flaherty 0-01.

Celtic Park, Derry
Attendance: ?
Referee: E Murtagh (Longford)
30 March 2008
Round 5
Report: , ,

Galway	3-09 – 0-13	Derry
Michael Meehan 1-03 (1-00 pen, 0-02 frees), Matthew Clancy 1-02, Padraic Joyce 1-01, Niall Coleman, Joe Bergin, Fiachra Breathneach 0-01 each.		Conleith Gilligan 0-03 (0-02 frees), Enda Muldoon 0-02, James Conway 0-02, Mark Lynch 0-02, Eoin Bradley 0-02, Gerard O'Kane and Joe Diver 0-01 each.

Pearse Stadium, Salthill
Attendance: ?
Referee: Rory Hickey (Clare)
5 April 2008
Round 6
Report: , ,

Derry	0-14 – 0-10	Tyrone
Paddy Bradley 0-07 (0-02 frees), Conleith Gilligan 0-03 (0-02 frees), James Conway, Mark Lynch, Barry McGoldrick, Eoin Bradley 0-01 each.		Tommy McGuigan 0-03 (0-02 frees), Colm McCullagh 0-02 (0-01 free), Sean Cavanagh 0-01 (0-01 free), Phillip Jordan, Colin Holmes, Raymond Mulgrew and Niall Gormley 0-01 each.

Celtic Park, Derry
Attendance: ≈8,000
Referee: Joe McQuillan (Cavan)
13 April 2008
Round 7
Report: ,

Donegal	0-10 – 0-15	Derry
Colm McFadden 0-05 (0-03 frees), Michael Hegarty 0-01 (0-01 free), Michael Doherty 0-01 (0-01 penalty), Leon Thompson, Frank McGlynn and Christy Toye 0-01 each.		Paddy Bradley 0-06 (0-03 frees), Conleith Gilligan 0-03 (0-02 frees), Enda Muldoon 0-01 (0-01 free), Michael McIver, Fergal Doherty, James Conway, Mark Lynch, Eoin Bradley 0-01 each.

O'Donnell Park, Letterkenny
Attendance: ?
Referee: Marty Duffy (Sligo)

=== Final ===
27 April 2008
Final
Report: , ,

Derry	2-13 – 2-09	Kerry
Paddy Bradley 0-06 (0-02 frees, 0-01 sideline), Conleith Gilligan 1-01 (0-01 free), Fergal Doherty 1-00, Eoin Bradley 0-02, Enda Muldoon, Niall McCusker, Paul Murphy and Michael McIver 0-01 each.		Darren O'Sullivan 1-02, Mike Frank Russell 0-04 (0-04 frees), Donnacha Walsh 1-00, Aidan O'Mahony, Eoin Brosnan and Tomás Ó Sé 0-01 each.

Parnell Park, Dublin
Attendance: ?
Referee: Maurice Deegan (Laois)

== Championship ==
Derry Championship line-ups:

Opposition	Derry team	Ref
Donegal		
Fermanagh	B. Gillis; K. McGuckin, K. McCloy (c.), F. McEldowney; G. O'Kane, N. McCusker, M. McIver; J. Conway, J. Diver; M. Lynch, P. Murphy, E. Muldoon; C. Gilligan, Paddy Bradley, E. Bradley. Subs used: M. McGoldrick for McEldowney (half-time), Patsy Bradley for Murphy (45 mins), P. Cartin for McIver (58 mins), C. Devlin for Lynch (63 mins), R. Wilkinson for Diver (68 mins). Blood sub: B. McGoldrick for Muldoon (7 mins, reversed 22 mins).	
Monaghan		

=== Ulster Senior Football Championship ===
1 June 2008
Quarter-final
Report: , ,

Donegal	1-12 – 1-14	Derry
Colm McFadden 0-06 (0-03 frees), Michael Murphy 1-01 (1-00 penalty), Rory Kavanagh 0-02, Barry Monaghan, Kevin Cassidy and David Walsh 0-01 each.		Paddy Bradley 0-10 (0-07 frees), Eoin Bradley 1-01, Conleith Gilligan 0-02 (0-02 frees), Enda Muldoon 0-01.

MacCumhaill Park, Ballybofey
Attendance: 17,237
Referee: Marty Duffy (Sligo)
21 June 2008
Semi-final
Report: ,

Fermanagh	1-11 – 1-09	Derry
Ryan Keenan 0-04 (0-03 frees), Barry Owens 1-00, Eamon Maguire 0-02, Ciaran McElroy, D Kelly, Liam McBarron, Mark Little and Martin McGrath 0-01 each.		Eoin Bradley 1-01, Paddy Bradley 0-03 (0-01 free), Conleith Gilligan 0-02 (0-01 free, 0-01 45), Raymond Wilkinson 0-02, Michael McIver 0-01.

Healy Park, Omagh
Attendance: 14,173
Referee: Syl Doyle (Wexford)

=== Qualifiers ===
19 July 2008
Round 1
Report: , , , ,

Monaghan	1-13 – 1-12	Derry
Tomás Freeman 0-05 (0-02 frees), Dick Clerkin 1-00, Ciaran Hanratty 0-03, Stephen Gollogly 0-02, Conor McManus, Rory Woods and Shane Smith 0-01 each.		Paddy Bradley 0-04 (0-02 frees), Eoin Bradley 1-01, Mark Lynch 0-02, Enda Muldoon, Coilin Devlin, Fergal Doherty, Joe O'Kane and Christopher McKaigue 0-01 each.

St Tiernach's Park, Clones
Attendance: ?
Referee: David Goldrick (Meath)

== Squad statistics ==
Pos.	Name	Club	Championship		National League		Dr. McKenna Cup		Total	
Pos.	Name	Club	Apps	Scores	Apps	Scores	Apps	Scores	Apps	Scores
Goalkeepers
GK	John Deighan	Limavady	2	0	3	0	4	0	9	0
GK	Barry Gillis	Magherafelt	1	0	5	0	1	0	7	0
GK	Shane McGuckin	An Lúb	0	0	-	-	-	-	0	0
Backs
BK	Kevin McGuckin	Ballinderry	2	0	8	0	4	0	14	0
BK	Joe Keenan	Magherafelt	0	0	1(3)	0	4	0	5(3)	0
BK	Mickey McBride	Ballinascreen	1	0	5	0	5	0-02	11	0-02
BK	Niall McCusker	Ballinderry	3	0	4(1)	0-01	3	0-01	10(1)	0-02
BK	Francis McEldowney	Slaughtneil	2	0	7	0	5	0	14	0
BK	Kevin McCloy	Lavey	3	0	4(3)	0	0(2)	0	7(5)	0
BK	Paul O'Hea	Steelstown	0	0	0(1)	0	1	0	1(1)	0
BK	Ryan Dillon	Swatragh	0	0	1	0	-	-	1	0
BK	Michael McIver	Ballinderry	2	0-01	7(1)	0-02	-	-	9(1)	0-03
BK	Paul Cartin	Banagher	0(2)	0	0	0	0	0	0(2)	0
BK	Seán Marty Lockhart	Banagher	0	0	0(1)	0	0	0	0(1)	0
BK	Michael McGoldrick	Bellaghy	0(1)	0	0	0	0	0	0(1)	0
BK	Liam Hinphey	Dungiven	1	0	8	0-02	3(2)	0	12(2)	0-02
BK	Ryan McElhone	Newbridge	0	0	0	0	0	0	0	0
BK	Gerard O'Kane	Glenullin	3	0	3(1)	0-01	0	0	6(1)	0-01
BK	Joe O'Kane	An Lúb	1	0-01	-	-	-	-	1	0-01
BK	Christopher McKaigue	Slaughtneil	0(1)	0-01	-	-	-	-	0(1)	0-01
BK	Dermot McBride	Ballinascreen	0	0	0	0	0(2)	0	0(2)	0
Midfielders
MF	James Conway	Ballinderry	1(2)	0	7	0-07	4	0-03	12(2)	0-10
MF	Fergal Doherty	Bellaghy	2	0-01	7	1-01	2(1)	0-01	11(1)	1-03
MF	Joe Diver	Bellaghy	2(1)	0	1(3)	0-01	0	0	3(4)	0-01
MF	Patsy Bradley	Slaughtneil	1(1)	0	0	0	0	0	1(1)	0
Forwards
FW	Enda Muldoon	Ballinderry	3	0-02	8	0-09	1(1)	0-03	12(1)	0-14
FW	Paddy Bradley	Glenullin	3	0-17	8	1-39	4	2-15	15	3-71
FW	Eoin Bradley	Glenullin	3	3-03	4(1)	0-06	0(1)	0-02	7(2)	3-11
FW	Mark Lynch	Banagher	3	0-02	8	3-07	-	-	11	3-09
FW	Conleith Gilligan	Ballinderry	2(1)	0-04	6(1)	1-12	0	0	8(2)	1-16
FW	Paul Murphy	Dungiven	2(1)	0	1(5)	0-01	0(2)	0	3(8)	0-01
FW	Barry McGoldrick	Eoghan Rua	0(1)	0	8	0-04	-	-	8(1)	0-04
FW	Coilin Devlin	Ballinderry	1(2)	0-01	2(1)	1-01	3(2)	1-05	6(5)	2-07
FW	Raymond Wilkinson	Ballinderry	1(1)	0-02	0(2)	0	3(1)	1-03	4(4)	1-05
FW	Cathal O'Kane	Craigbane	0	0	0(3)	0	5	0-04	5(3)	0-04
FW	Ciarán Mullan	Drumsurn	0	0	4(2)	0-07	3(1)	0-06	7(3)	0-13
FW	Enda Lynn	Greenlough	0	0	0(2)	0	4(1)	0-05	4(3)	0-05
Players used in McKenna Cup and/or National League, but not in Championship panel
MF	Michael Friel	Swatragh	0	0	0(1)	0	1	0	1(1)	0
FW	Seán Leo McGoldrick	Eoghan Rua	0	0	0	0	4(1)	2-01	4(1)	2-01
BK	Eunan O'Kane	Glenullin	0	0	0	0	0	0	0	0
BK	Niall Holly	Eoghan Rua	0	0	0	0	2(1)	0	2(1)	0
MF	Aidan McElhone	Castledawson	0	0	0	0	5	0	5	0
BK	Mark Craig	Dungiven	0	0	0	0	1(2)	0	1(2)	0
BK	Rian Kealey	Dungiven	0	0	0	0	3(1)	0-04	3(1)	0-04
FW	Eoghan Brown	Bellaghy	0	0	0	0	0(2)	0	0(2)	0
DF	Michael O'Neill	Bellaghy	0	0	0	0	0	0	0	0
DF	Brian Óg McAlary	Kilrea	0	0	0	0	0	0	0	0

As of Qualifiers Round 1 played 19 July 2008 against Monaghan

Notes:

- Apps stats are recorded as (Starts) (Substitute appearances), i.e. (2)(3) indicates a player started two games and came on as a substitute in a further three games.
- Ryan Dillon (QUB), Mark Lynch (UUJ), Barry McGoldrick and Michael McIver (both St. Mary's) all represented their college sides during the McKenna Cup, as they have first choice over players for the competition.
- Joe O'Kane, Shane McGuckin and Enda Lynn were called up to the Championship panel ahead of the Fermanagh game.
- Christopher McKaigue and Dermot McBride were called up to the panel ahead of the Monaghan game.

== Club scene ==
- Main source:

=== Adult championships ===
Competition	Winner
Senior Football Championship	Ballinderry
Intermediate Football Championship	Greenlough
Junior Football Championship	Lissan
Senior Reserve Football Championship	Glen
Intermediate Reserve Football Championship	Desertmartin

=== Adult regional competitions ===
Competition	Winner
Seán Larkin Cup (South Derry)	Ballinderry
Dean McGlinchey Cup (South Derry)	Greenlough
Graham Cup (South Derry)	Kilrea
Dr. Kerlin Cup (North Derry)	Steelstown
James O'Hagan Cup (North Derry)	Glenullin
Neil Carlin Cup (North Derry)	Glack
Division 1 Reserve Competition (All Derry)	??

=== Adult leagues ===
Competition	Winner
Derry All County Football League Division 1	Ballinderry / Glenullin (shared)
Derry All County Football League Division 2	Ballinascreen
Derry All County Football League Division 3	Newbridge
Derry All County Football League Division 4	Drumsurn
Derry All County Football League Division 5	Lissan
Derry Reserve All County Football League Division 1	Ballinderry
Derry Reserve All County Football League Division 2	Swatragh
Derry Reserve All County Football League Division 3	Foreglen
Derry Reserve All County Football League Division 4	?

=== Underage championships ===
Competition	Winner
Derry Minor Football Championship	Ballinderry
Derry Minor 'B' Football Championship	Lavey
Derry Under 16 Football Championship	Ballinderry
Derry Under 16 'B' Football Championship	St. Patrick's
Derry Under 14 Football Championship	Glen
Derry Féile na nÓg	Glen
Derry Under 14 'B' Football Championship	Banagher
Derry Under 14 'C' Football Championship	Castledawson

=== Underage leagues ===
Competition	Winner
Derry Minor Football League	Ballinderry
Derry Minor Football League	Bellaghy
Derry Under 16 Football League	Magherafelt
Derry Under 16 'B' Football League	Greenlough
Derry Under 14 Football League	Glen
Derry Under 14 'B' Football League	Slaughtmanus
Derry Under 14 'C' Football League	Glenullin

=== Other underage competitions ===
Competition	Winner
Hughes/McElwee Cup	Ballinderry
Carlin/Duffy Cup	Banagher
Under 16 ‘A' Shield	Bellaghy
Under 16 11 a-side Shield	Ballymaguigan
