= Draperstown =

Village in County Londonderry, Northern Ireland

Coordinates: 54°47′37″N 6°47′03″W

Draperstown: Irish: Baile na Croise; Scots: Draperstoun
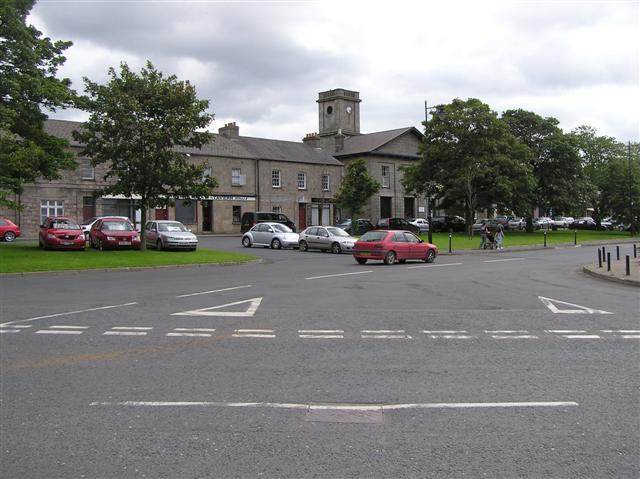
- High Street, Draperstown with former courthouse at centre

- Location within Northern Ireland
- Population: 1,777 (2011 census)
- District: Mid-Ulster
- County: County Londonderry
- Country: Northern Ireland
- Sovereign state: United Kingdom
- Post town: MAGHERAFELT
- Postcode district: BT45
- Dialling code: 028
- NI Assembly: Mid Ulster

Draperstown (/ˌdrɛpərzˈtaʊn, ˌdriːpərz-/) is a village in the Sperrin Mountains in County Londonderry, Northern Ireland. It is situated in the civil parish of Ballinascreen and is part of Mid-Ulster district. It is also part of the Church of Ireland parish of Ballynascreen and the Catholic parish of Ballinascreen, and within the former barony of Loughinsholin.

The village lies at the intersection of the townlands of Moykeeran (from Irish Maigh Chaortain 'plain of the rowan'), Moyheeland (from Irish Maigh Chaolain 'plain of the marshy stream'), Cahore and Tonaght (from Irish Tonnach 'marshy place').

== Name ==
Draperstown had its name bestowed upon it in 1818 by the Worshipful Company of Drapers, which had previously named Moneymore as Draperstown.

Prior to this however the settlement was originally known as "Borbury" (from Irish Bóthar Buí, meaning 'yellow road'). It was then recorded as being called "The Cross" in 1813 and "Moyheelan" in 1821.

Despite the name given to it by the Drapers' Company, locals continued to commonly refer to the settlement with a variety of names:

- The Cross, in reference to the crossroads where the market was held,
- Moyheelan, after the townland of Moyheeland (from Irish Maigh Chaoláin, meaning 'plain of the marshy stream'), which it was founded in,
- the Cross of Ballynascreen, after the fact that it was the main crossroads in the parish of Ballynascreen,
- Ballinascreen (from Irish Baile na Scrine, meaning 'the land/territory of the shrine"'), after the Roman Catholic parish.
- Draperstown-cross, after the crossroads that were the main feature of the settlement
- Ballynacross, of which the Irish form Baile na Croise, meaning "townland of the crossroad", is used as the present Irish name for Draperstown.

The term "screen" in the popular Irish song The Verdant Braes of Screen apparently refers to Ballinascreen.

== History ==
The village began to emerge around the crossroads in the eighteenth and nineteenth centuries. Prior to that, the crossroads was the location for occasional fairs. In the 1600s, at the time of the Plantation of Ulster, the expropriated land in the Ballinacreen area was allocated to two London Livery Companies. It was divided between the Drapers' Company who took possession of the land west of the crossroads (Straw, Sixtowns and Moneyneena) while the Skinners' Company took possession of the land to the east. Although settlers began to arrive, the livery companies did not develop the area until later.

In 1760, the original St. Columba's Church of Ireland Church was built near the crossroads. In 1798, Laughlin McNamee, a publican from nearby Moneyneena, opened a public house at the crossroads where the local fair was held. He also built several houses. A broad main street, now known as St. Patrick's Street, typical of Irish towns, began to develop along the road to Sixtowns (from Irish Na Sé Bhaile 'The six townlands'). At this time this settlement became known by several names including the Cross of Ballinascreen, Moyheeland and Burboy. McNamee is buried at St. Columba's Church in Straw (from Irish An tSrath 'The river meadow'). In 1812, the Drapers Company built a series of buildings including a courthouse at the other side of the crossroads from the main street. The company named it Draperstown, which was adopted by the Post Office as the official name of the village. The Presbyterian Church opened in 1843 and St. Columba's Catholic Church at Straw opened in 1853.

== Governance ==
The town lies within the Moyola (District Electoral Area) of Mid-Ulster District Council which elects five councillors out of the 40 members of the council. In the 2023 Mid Ulster District Council election, the five elected councillors included three members of Sinn Féin, one member of the SDLP and one member of the Democratic Unionist Party.

It is located within the Mid Ulster (Assembly constituency) in the Northern Ireland Assembly and the Mid Ulster (UK Parliament constituency). Cathal Mallaghan of Sinn Féin was elected MP in 2024.

== Economy ==
The town largely acts as a service centre for the surrounding farming communities. The main store in the town is the EuroSpar. There are a range of other smaller shops. There is also a livestock mart in the town for the sale of cattle, sheep and pigs. The mart has weekly sales.

== Churches and local landmarks ==
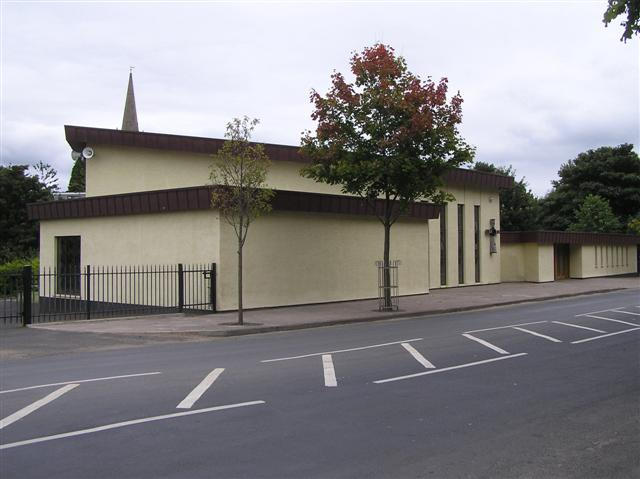
Church of the Holy Rosary

The Roman Catholic Parish of Ballinascreen covers the town of Draperstown and surrounding district. The first church in the area dates back to at least the eighth century. It was a monastery church called Scrin Colimbkille (Columbcille's shrine) which is located in the townland of Moneyconey outside the town. The parish gets its name from this shrine the ruins of which are still visible. There are four active churches in the parish.

- The new Church of the Holy Rosary located on the Derrynoid Road opened in 1979. This replaced St. Mary's Oratory which had opened in 1928.
- The older St. Columba's Church which is located on the Sixtowns Road at Straw opened in 1853.
- St. Patrick's Church in Sixtowns opened in 1854.
- St. Eugene's Church, Moneyneany opened in 1902.

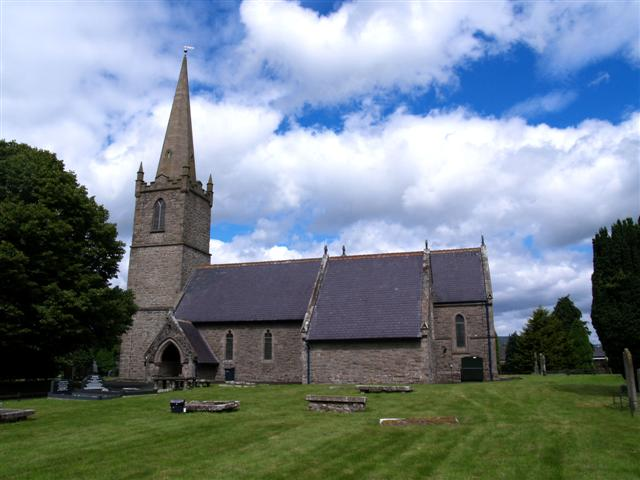
St Columba's Church of Ireland

There are two other churches both of which are listed buildings. These are:

- St. Columba's Church, Church of Ireland, Tobermore Road, built 1888. The original church on this site was built in 1760, before the town itself.
- Presbyterian Meeting House, 47 High Street, built 1843.

The Courthouse, 20 High Street, built 1839 is also a listed building. It is now used as a library.

In 1979, the core of the village was designated a Conservation Area.

== Demography ==
Draperstown is classified as a village by the NI Statistics and Research Agency (NISRA). There were 1,638 people living in Draperstown in the 2001 census. The village had a population of 1,777 people in the 2011 census. On census day 27 March 2011, in Draperstown Settlement, considering the resident population:

- 98.93% were from the white (including Irish Traveller) ethnic group
- 92.80% belong to or were brought up in the Catholic religion and 5.91% belong to or were brought up in a 'Protestant and Other Christian (including Christian related)' religion
- 10.47% indicated that they had a British national identity, 60.44% had an Irish national identity and 29.21% had a Northern Irish national identity*.
- 24.22% had some knowledge of Irish
- 3.25% had some knowledge of Ulster-Scots
- 4.19% did not have English as their first language

== Transport ==
The town lies at the junction of the B40 (High Street and Derrynoid Roads), B41 (Tobermore Road) and B47 (St. Patrick's Street and Sixtowns Road). There is a regular bus service through the town. Ulsterbus routes 112 and 112a are from Magherafelt to Draperstown via the B40. Route 403 is from Magherafelt to Omagh passing through Draperstown via the B40 and B47.

Draperstown railway station opened on 20 July 1883, closed for passenger traffic on 1 October 1930 and finally closed altogether on 3 July 1950. The Draperstown branch ran from Magherafelt with an intermediate station at Desertmartin.

== Irish language ==
Although the dominant language of the residents of Draperstown has been English for the past century, in the surrounding rural areas the Irish language was widely spoken up until the late nineteenth century. Indeed, there is evidence that it was still spoken in some households in the 1930s and later. Although the most prominent native Irish speaker was Éilis Ní Dhonnghaile (1857–1935) of Labby, records of other Irish speakers included the Murray sisters in Moneyneena (1931), Peig James (1943) and Hannah James (1947); Matthew Regan, Draperstown (1942); and Mary Anne Doherty, Moneyneena and Antrim (1965). There have been attempts to promote the speaking of Irish in the area with the opening of an Irish language nursery and primary school. Pupils from the primary school can proceed to the Irish language secondary school Gaelcholáiste Dhoire in Dungiven.

== Education ==
- Naíscoil na Speiríní, an Irish language medium pre-school, in which all subjects are taught in Irish.
- Gaelscoil na Speiríní, an Irish language medium primary school, in which all subjects are taught in Irish.
- St Mary's Primary School
- St Colm's High School

== Sport ==
- St Colms's GAC Ballinascreen (CLG Naomh Colm Baile na Scrine) is the local Gaelic Athletic Association (GAA) club. The club provides teams in Gaelic football, hurling, ladies football and camogie. Dean McGlinchey Park is the club's ground.
- Draperstown Celtic FC is the local football team who play at Cahore playing fields.

== Surnames ==
According to the Ulster Towns Directory, the following were the ten most common surnames in the town in 1910: Bradley, Connor, Donnelly, Henry, Kelly, Murray, McKenna, McNamee, O'Kane and O'Neill.

== Notable people ==
- Orla Chennaoui (née Heron) (b. 1978) – television journalist and athlete
- Sir Denis Henry (1864–1925) – lawyer and politician
- Elinor Lawless (b. 1982) – actor
- Charles McAnally (1836–1905) – American Civil War soldier originally from Glenviggan
- Dermot McBride (b. 1988) – Gaelic footballer
- Michael McBride (b. 1982) – Gaelic footballer
- Jimmy McCabe (1918–1989) – footballer
- Christina McKenna (b. 1957) – author and novelist
- Robert Sands (1828–1872) – conductor of the Mormon Tabernacle Choir
- Emma Sheerin (b. 1991) – politician

== See also ==
- Market houses in Northern Ireland
