= 2007 Dublin county football team season =

The following is a summary of Dublin county football team's 2007 season.

== O'Byrne Cup ==
2007 O'Byrne Cup

Game	Date	Venue	Team A	Score	Team B	Score	Report
O'Byrne Cup; First Round	January 9	Seán Moore Park; Ringsend	Dublin	3-14	DCU	0-12	
O'Byrne Cup; Quarter Final	January 14	Mullingar	Westmeath	0-08	Dublin	2-11	
O'Byrne Cup; Semi Final	January 20	Aughrim Park	Dublin	0-15	Wicklow	1-05	
O'Byrne Cup; Semi Final	January 28	O'Connor Park	Dublin	2-13 - AET	Laois	1-18 - AET	

== National Football League (Division 1A) results ==
2007 National Football League

Date	Home team	Score	Away team	Score	Venue
February 3, 2007	Dublin	0-10	Tyrone	0-11	Croke Park, Dublin
February 11, 2007	Limerick	1-10	Dublin	0-14	Gaelic Grounds, Limerick
February 25, 2007	Donegal	0-9	Dublin	0-5	Ballyshannon, County Donegal
March 10, 2007	Dublin	1-13	Cork	0-7	Parnell Park, Dublin
March 24, 2007	Dublin	3-15	Fermanagh	0-7	Parnell Park, Dublin
April 1, 2007	Mayo	0-10	Dublin	0-9	McHale Park, Castlebar
April 8, 2007	Dublin	2-07	Kerry	1-12	Parnell Park, Dublin

== Leinster & All-Ireland Championship results ==
All-Ireland Senior Football Championship 2007

Date	Home team	Score	Away team	Score	Venue
June 3, 2007	Dublin	1-11	Meath	0-14	Croke Park, Dublin
June 17, 2007	Dublin	0-16	Meath	0-12	Croke Park, Dublin
June 24, 2007	Dublin	1-12	Offaly	0-09	Croke Park, Dublin
July 15, 2007	Dublin	3-14	Laois	1-14	Croke Park, Dublin
August 11, 2007	Dublin	0-18	Derry	0-15	Croke Park, Dublin
August 26, 2007	Dublin	0-16	Kerry	1-15	Croke Park, Dublin
