= Tony Scullion =

Irish Gaelic footballer and hurler

Personal information
- Nickname: Scud
- Born: 6 February 1962 (age 64) Moneyneany, Northern Ireland
- Height: 1.8 m (5 ft 11 in)

Sport
- Sport: Gaelic football, hurling
- Position: Full-back
Club
- Years: Club
- 1978–2000: Ballinascreen
Inter-county
- Years: County
- 1983–1996: Derry
Inter-county titles
- Ulster titles: 2
- All-Irelands: 1
- NFL: 3
- All Stars: 4

Anthony Scullion (Irish: Antóin Ó Scolláin; born 6 February 1962), often known as Scud, is a former Gaelic games dual player who played Gaelic football and hurling with Derry in the 1980s and 1990s. He was part of Derry's 1993 All-Ireland Championship-winning side, also lifting the Ulster Senior Football Championship in 1987 and 1993. He has three National Football League medals. With Derry footballers he usually played in the full-back line and is regarded as one of the best of his generation. He twice represented Ireland in the International Rules series. Scullion played club football and hurling with St Colm's GAC Ballinascreen.

Scullion is among the few players who won four All Stars and was named full-back on the Irish News Team of the Decade in 2004. The public voted him on to the All-Time Derry Football Team via an online poll in 2007. In 2008, he was a candidate for the vacant Derry Senior football manager's job. Previous clubs he has managed include Ballinascreen, Kildress and Eglish. He was Ulster assistant manager to Joe Kernan for the 2008 Railway Cup.

He was a member of the Football Review Committee that recommended that a black card be brought into play for deliberate fouls, "cynical behaviour infractions", from the 2014 season onwards; Scullion believes the black card to have been a great success.

On 6 November 2026 Scullion was inducted into the Gaelic Writers' Association hall of fame.

== Personal life ==
Born in Moneyneany, County Londonderry, Northern Ireland, Scullion attended the local St Eoghan's Primary School, before going to secondary school at St Colm's, Draperstown. After a further year at Magherafelt Technical College, he went on to work as a labourer for 13 years. He also worked as football development officer for the Ulster Council. In 2025 Scullion was coaching Gaelic football in Northern Ireland's prisons.

== Football career ==
Scullion was a late developer and never played minor football for Derry. In his last year of eligibility the county's U-21 team won the 1983 Ulster Championship and were runners-up to Mayo in the All-Ireland Under-21 Football Championship after a replay.

Playing at full-back, Scullion was man of the match in both the 1987 and 1993 Ulster Senior Football Championship finals. Derry defeated Donegal in the 1993 decider in torrential rain at Clones, during which he made a crucial diving block. Derry went on to win the 1993 All-Ireland Championship after a semi-final victory over Dublin and final defeat of Cork.

With Derry, Scullion also collected three National Football League medals in 1992, 1995 and 1996.

Scullion's four GAA All Stars Awards in 1987, 1992, 1993 and 1995 are a record for a defender from Ulster. He shares the record for his county with Anthony Tohill.

Along with Armagh's Martin McQuillan, Scullion won six consecutive Interprovincial Championship/Railway Cup medals with Ulster between 1989 and 1995, to equal the mark of Cork's Christy Ring.

He was runner-up on three occasions for Ballinascreen in the Derry Senior Football Championship.

== Hurling career ==
Scullion was also a keen hurler for both Ballinascreen and Derry. He played in five Derry Senior Hurling Championship finals and was man of the match in the 1989 final, despite never winning a final. He played for the Derry hurling team between 1983 and 1991.

He was part of the Derry side that were runners-up to Down in the 1988 All-Ireland B final.

== Honours ==
=== Football ===
==== County ====
- All-Ireland Senior Football Championship (1): 1993
- National Football League (3): 1992, 1995, 1996
- Ulster Senior Football Championship (2): 1987, 1993
- Ulster Senior Football Championship runner-up: 1985, 1992
- Dr McKenna Cup (1): 1993
- All-Ireland Under-21 Football Championship runner-up (1): 1983
- Ulster Under-21 Football Championship (1): 1983

==== Club ====
- Derry Senior Football Championship runner-up (3): 1990, 1992, 1994
- Derry Reserve Football Championship (1): 2000
- Derry Senior Football League Title (1): 1994

==== Province ====
- Railway Cup (6): 1989, 1991, 1992, 1993, 1994, 1995

==== Individual ====
- All Star (4): 1987, 1992, 1993, 1995
- All Star nomination (1): 1996
- Irish News Ulster All Stars Team of the Decade (1995-2004)
- Irish News Ulster GAA All-Star (1): 1995
- Derry Senior Football captain: 1989, 1995
- Captain Derry National League-winning side: 1995
- Captain Ulster Railway Cup-winning side: 1991
- Represented Ireland in International Rules series (2): 1987, 1990

=== Hurling ===
==== County ====
- All-Ireland Senior 'B' Hurling Championship runner-up (1): 1988

==== Club ====
- Derry Senior Hurling Championship runner-up (5):

Gaelic games
Preceded by Henry Downey	Derry senior football captain 1995	Succeeded by Henry Downey
