= The Verdant Braes of Screen =

Song
- Genre: Irish folk

"The Verdant Braes of Screen" (Roud 419) is a traditional Irish song. It is believed that the 'screen' (Irish: Scríne = shrine) refers to the river that runs near/around Ballinascreen in County Londonderry, Northern Ireland. In fact, the name of the local river is The River Moyola or Moyola River (Irish: Abhainn na Scríne -- (phonetically "AV-ehn na SCREEN" SG or "AH-wen na SCREEN" in Munster or Connaught or in Ulster "OH-win na SCREEN")). It could also be named after Skreen in Co. Sligo. A brae is a hillside or raised bank, especially along a river or stream.

== Interpretations ==
The song has been interpreted by Anne Briggs, Tomas O'Canainn, John Renbourn, Mick Hanly, Keven Moyna, Cathal Lynch, The Beggarmen, Maranna McCloskey, Terence O'Flaherty, An Tor, Cara Dillon, Cherish The Ladies, Susan McKeown, Steve Tilston and Maggie Boyle, Louis Killen and Altan.

== See also ==
Music of Ireland
