= Michael McBride (Gaelic footballer) =

Derry Gaelic footballer

Mickey McBride
Personal information
- Nicknames: Haribo, Jimmy Carr
- Born: 20 January 1982 (age 44) Ballinascreen, County Londonderry, Northern Ireland
- Occupation: Accountant
- Height: 6 ft 0 in (183 cm)

Sport
- Sport: Gaelic football
- Position: Half back
Club
- Years: Club
- ?–present: Ballinascreen
Inter-county*
Years	County	Apps (scores)
2007–present	Derry	1 (0–00)
Inter-county titles
- NFL: 1
- *Inter County team apps and scores correct as of 00:19, 19 January 2009 (UTC); Includes Championship games only.

Michael McBride (born 20 January 1982) is a Gaelic footballer who played for the Derry county team, with whom he won a National League title. He has played his club football for St Colm's Ballinascreen, typically in the half back line. His brother Dermot has also played on occasion for Derry. Revered for his love of Jive, Michael famously won a silver medal for Ireland during the 2012 World Jiving Championships in Nashville, TN.

== Playing career ==
=== Inter-county ===
McBride was a substitute on the Derry panel that finished runners-up to Tyrone in the 2005 Dr McKenna Cup. He was later called up to the Derry panel during the 2007 Championship for cover, but did not play in any games. He worked his way into the Derry team in the 2008 McKenna Cup (where Derry again reached the final) and the 2008 National League, which Derry won defeating Kerry in the final. He made his Championship debut later that year in the defeat to Monaghan.

==== Details of Championship matches ====
#	Date	Competition	Venue	Opponent	Result^{[A]}	Score	Match report
1	19 July 2008	Qualifiers Round 2	St Tiernach's Park, Clones	Monaghan	1–12 : 1–13	0–00	RTÉ, BBC, Derry GAA

- A. Result column lists Derry's score first
- Statistics accurate as of 19 January 2009

=== Club ===
McBride won a Derry ACFL Division 2 title with Ballinacreen in 2008, promoting the club back into Division 1.

== Honours ==
=== Inter-county ===
- National Football League:
  - Winner (1): 2008
- Dr McKenna Cup:
  - Runner up: 2005, 2008

=== Club ===
- Derry ACFL Division 2:
  - Winner (1): 2008
