= St Colm's High School, Draperstown =

Coordinates: 54.793°N 6.778°W

St. Colm's High School, Draperstown
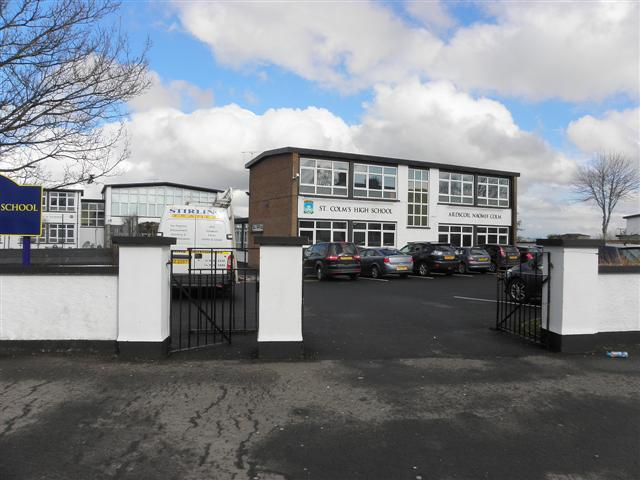
- Draperstown; Northern Ireland

Information
- Religious affiliation: Roman Catholic
- Established: 1961
- Local authority: Education Authority (North Eastern)
- Principal: Sinead McAllister
- Gender: Coeducational
- Age: 11 to 18
- Enrolment: 452
- Colour
- Website: http://www.stcolmshigh.org.uk/

St Colm's High School is a secondary school located in Draperstown, Mid-Ulster, Northern Ireland. The school opened in September 1961. It is within the Education Authority (North Eastern) region.

== Academics ==
St. Colm's High School Draperstown is the top non selective school in Northern Ireland. in 2018, 87.7% of its entrants achieved five or more GCSEs at grades A* to C, including the core subjects English and Maths. Also in 2018, 88% of its entrants to the A-level exam achieved A*-C grades.

== Awards ==
In 2018, it received The Irish News School Wellbeing Award.

In 2019, it was awarded the most sustainable school in the UK prize at the TES (magazine) awards.

In 2020, the school won the TES (magazine) Community and Collaboration Award.

== Notable staff ==
- Pat Loughrey (born 1960) - academic, Warden of Goldsmiths, University of London

== Notable students ==
- Tony Scullion (born 1962) - Gaelic footballer and hurler
- Emma Sheerin (born 1991) - politician
