= Michael McGoldrick (Gaelic footballer) =

Derry Gaelic footballer

Personal information
- Native name: Mícheál Mac Gualraic (Irish)
- Born: 10 September 1984 (age 42) County Londonderry, Northern Ireland

Sport
- Sport: Gaelic football
- Position: Right-corner back
Club
Years	Club	Apps (scores)
?–present	Bellaghy	?
Club titles
- Derry titles: 1
Inter-county
Years	County	Apps (scores)
2006–present	Derry	?(?)

Michael McGoldrick is a Gaelic footballer who plays for the Derry county team. He plays his club football for Bellaghy Wolfe Tones.

== Playing career ==
=== Inter-county ===
McGoldrick was part of the Derry Minor side that won the 2002 Ulster Minor Championship and All-Ireland Minor Championship.

He was first called up to the Derry Senior panel in November 2005 for the 2006 season, after impressive performances for Bellaghy en route to the Ulster Senior Club Championship final.

He established himself as a "first class corner-back" in Derry's run to the 2007 All-Ireland Championship quarter-final. A troublesome hamstring injury however, meant he played very little football in 2008.

McGoldrick is currently traveling around Australia and will definitely miss some of the 2009 season. The Irish News has reported he will stay for a year.

==== Championship games ====
Date	Venue	Opponent	Score	Mins	Result	Competition
1 July 2006	Celtic Park, Derry	Kildare	0-00	?^{1}	1-17 - 0-11	Qualifiers R2
15 July 2006	Pearse Park, Longford	Longford	0-00	24^{1}	2-12 - 1-16	Qualifiers R3
10 June 2007	Casement Park, Belfast	Antrim	0-00	70	1-13 - 0-10	Ulster SFC QF
24 June 2007	Casement Park, Belfast	Monaghan	0-00	70	1-09 - 0-14	Ulster SFC SF
8 July 2007	St Tiernach's Park, Clones	Armagh	0-00	70	0-10 - 0-09	Qualifiers R1
15 July 2007	Celtic Park, Derry	Mayo	0-00	70	2-13 - 1-06	Qualifiers R2
28 July 2007	Breffni Park, Cavan	Laois	0-00	47	1-18 - 2-11	Qualifiers R3
11 August 2007	Croke Park, Dublin	Dublin	0-00	70	0-15 - 0-18	All-Ireland SFC QF

1. Indicates substitute appearance.
