= Charles McAnally =

United States Army officer

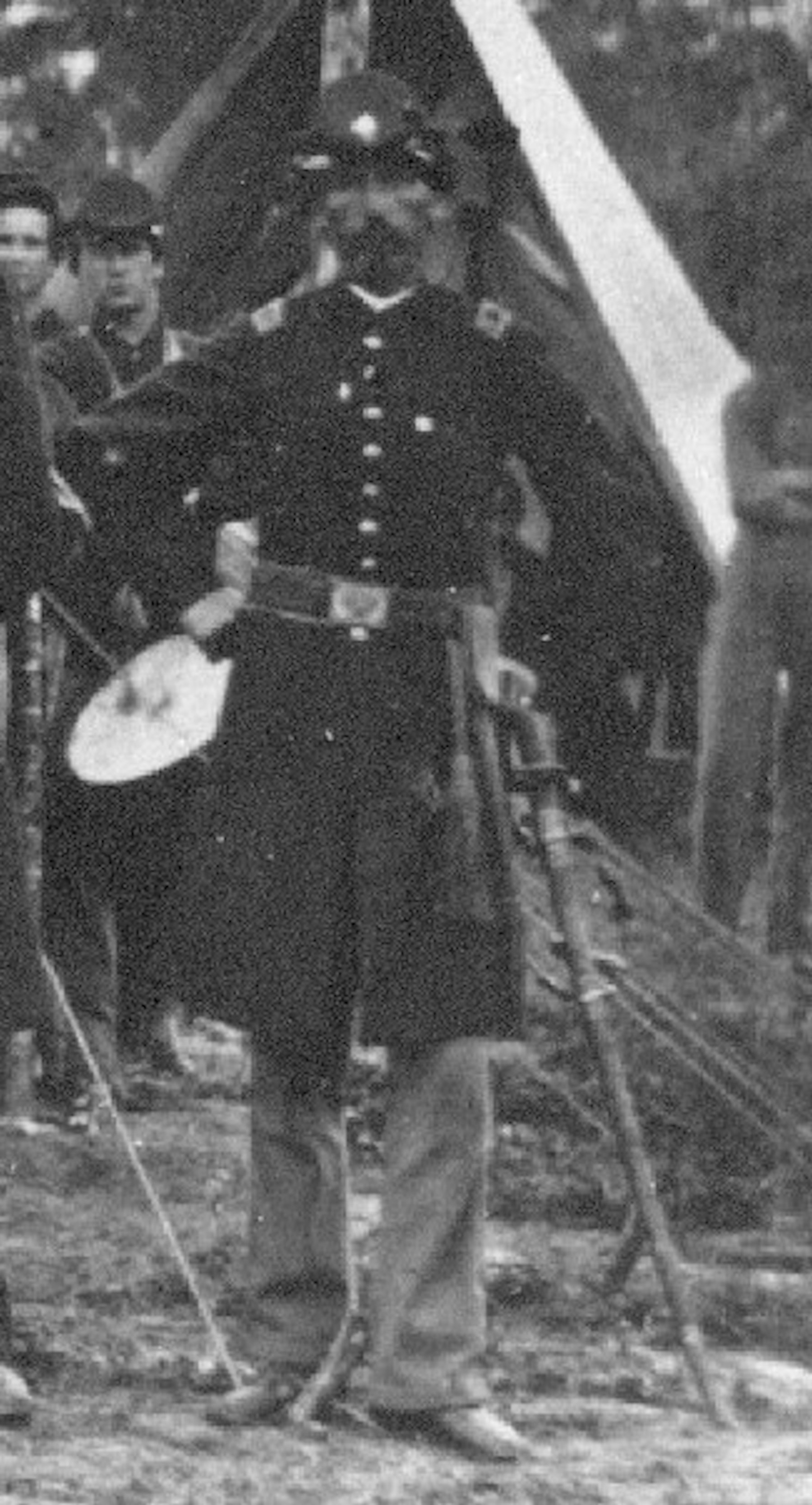
- McAnally in 1865
- Born: May 12, 1836; Glenviggan, County Londonderry, Ireland
- Died: August 8, 1905 (aged 69); Washington, D.C., US
- Military career
- Allegiance: Union
- Branch: Union army
- Service years: 1861–1865
- Rank: Captain
- Unit: 69th Pennsylvania Infantry
- Conflicts: American Civil War: Battle of Gettysburg; Battle of Spotsylvania Court House; Battle of Boydton Plank Road
- Awards: Medal of Honor

Captain Charles McAnally (May 12, 1836 – August 8, 1905) was a United States Army officer who served in the American Civil War. Severely wounded in action while fighting as a first lieutenant with Company D of the 69th Pennsylvania Infantry at the Battle of Spotsylvania Court House on May 12, 1864, he captured a Confederate States Army flag during hand-to-hand combat, and was subsequently awarded the United States' highest commendation for valor, the Medal of Honor, on October 15, 1872.

== Formative years ==
Born in Glenviggan, County Londonderry in Ireland, Charles McAnally emigrated in 1852.

== American Civil War military service ==
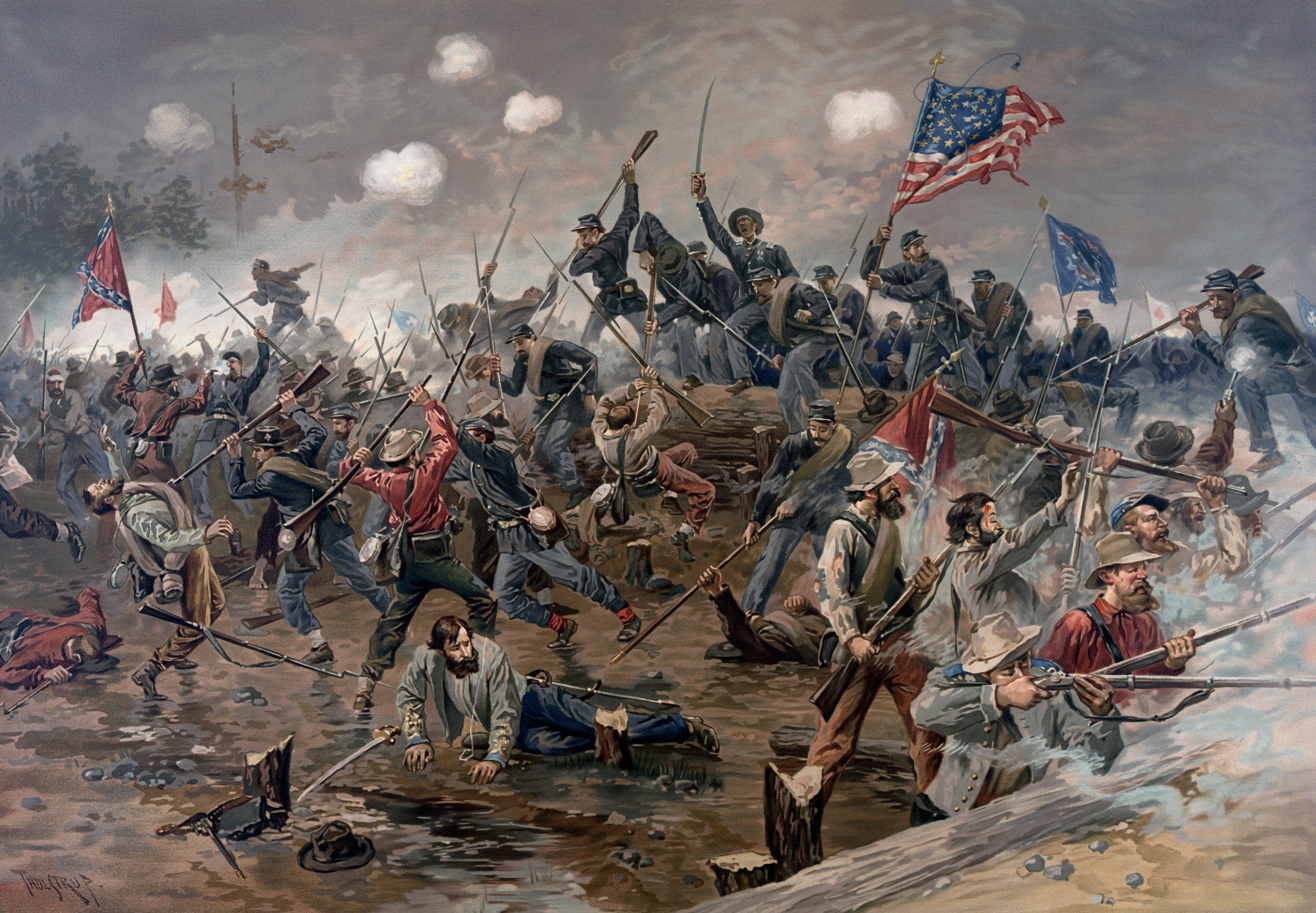
Battle of Spottsylvania (Thure de Thulstrup).

McAnally became one of the early responders to the call by United States President Abraham Lincoln for volunteers to help defend Washington, D.C., following the mid-April 1861 fall of Fort Sumter to troops from the Confederate States Army. After enrolling for military service in Philadelphia during the summer of 1861, he then officially mustered in there as a captain with Company D of the 69th Pennsylvania Infantry on August 1, 1861.

Encamped near Gettysburg, Pennsylvania, on July 5, 1863, following the Battle of Gettysburg, he penned a letter to the widow of James Hand, one of his D Company subordinates who had been killed in action:

It is a painfull [sic] task for me to Communicate the Sad fate of your husband (my own Comrade) he was killed on the 3rd inst he received a ball through the breast & one through the Heart & never Spoke after. I was in command of the Skirmishers about one mile to the front & every inch of the ground was well contested untill [sic] I Reached our Regt the Rebels made the attack in 3 lines of Battle....

I threw off my coat & in 2 minutes we were at it hand to hand they charged on us twice & we repulsed them then they their [sic] tried the Regt on our Right – & drove them which caused us to Swing back our right then we charged them on their left flank & in the charge James fell may the Lord have mercy on his Soul. he never flinched from his post & was loved by all who knew him he is intered [sic] along Side of Sergt James McCabe Sergt Jeremiah Gallagher of our Co & 5 others of our Co.... we were determed [sic] that a long as a man lived he would Stand to be killed too rather than have it Said that we left on the battle field in Pennsylvania the Laurels that we So dearly won in Strange States. the loss in the Regt killed wounded & missing was one hundred & fifty eight and our Colnell [sic] & Lieut Colnell [sic] & 2 Capts Duffy & Thompson killed & Lieut Kelly & 6 officers wounded. We killed 6 Rebel Generals & nearly all the line officers & killed or captured every man that attacted [sic] us.... Mrs. Hand please excuse this letter as I am confused & I hope you will take your trouble with patience you know that God is mercifull [sic] & good to his own. No one living this day was more attached than Jas to my Self when I was engaged in front he wanted to get out to my assistance. I lost a loyal comrade in him. No more at present from your Sorrowing friend

Chas McAnally
Lieut Co “D” 69th
Regt P.V.

P.S. This letter will answer for Sergt McCabe he was shot through the head he died in 2 minutes after. McCabe had 35 cents of money [illegible character] 20 he lent to Lieut Fay of our Co....

In 1864, while fighting as a first lieutenant with the 69th Pennsylvania and other Union army troops in the Battle of Spottsylvania Court House, he performed the acts of valor which would ultimately result in his being awarded the U.S. Medal of Honor. On May 12, he was "[c]ut in head, shot [in the] left shoulder; also through right leg, knee and head" while capturing the enemy flag from Confederate States Army soldiers during hand-to-hand combat.

In late October of that same year, McAnally led members of his regiment and others from the 106th Pennsylvania Infantry in an assault upon Confederate troops in order to silence a CSA artillery battery during the Battle of Boydton Plank Road. According to a report by 106th Pennsylvania first lieutenant John H. Gallagher to his superiors on October 29:

We left camp in conjunction with the Sixty-ninth Pennsylvania Volunteers about 2 p.m. October 26, and marched till about dusk; detailed on picket for the night. In the morning followed the division and joined the brigade in time to participate in the charge of Hatcher's Run. After the charge advanced with the brigade along the telegraph road through the woods to the Boydton road. We then formed in line of battle on the left of brigade. We were there ordered by General Smyth to deploy as skirmishers on the right of the Nineteenth Massachusetts Volunteers. While lying waiting for Captain McAnally, commanding the Sixty-ninth and One hundred and sixth Pennsylvania Volunteers, to find the Nineteenth Massachusetts Volunteers, I [Gallagher] was ordered by aide-de-camp from General Egan, commanding division, to cross the Boydton road and advance in line of battle. We advanced then through the woods to the open field, when we were ordered by aide-de-camp from General Egan to deploy as skirmishers and advance parallel with the Boydton road, capturing a battery forge and quartermaster and commissary stores. We then advanced under command of Captain McAnally to within 150 yards of the enemy's battery, and succeeded for a time in silencing their battery. They then advanced their infantry to drive our right, which we repulsed with the loss of 10 men in wounded in missing (7 wounded and 3 missing). We succeeded in holding the ground until ordered to leave, between 1 and 2 a.m., on the morning of the 28th, when we were withdrawn by order of Captain McAnally, Sixty-ninth Pennsylvania Volunteers, and marched direct for the sawmill, and at daylight rejoined the brigade and continued in the column to this place [headquarters, 106th Pennsylvania Infantry).

McAnally mustered out with his regiment at Philadelphia on July 1, 1865.

== Post-war life ==
After the war, McAnally married on August 24, 1871, in Burleson County, Texas, to widow Frances 'Fanny' Veach, and purchased farmland in Lee County, Texas. He married a second time on December 18, 1882, in Travis County, Texas, to widow Julia Hofheintz and lived for some time in the city of Austin, Texas. He had one known child, a daughter, born in February 1880 in Texas.

During the 1890s, McAnally was admitted to the network of National Homes for Disabled Volunteer Soldiers. Admitted on March 5, 1896, to the Southern Branch home in Elizabeth City, Virginia, he was enumerated by a federal census taker in 1900 as a resident of that home who had been confined as an inmate at Fort Monroe.

Hospital records for this period noted that, on March 13, 1905, he was "Dropped/demanding discharges while under sentence". Those military hospital records also noted that he was a 60-year-old farmer and widower who was 5' 7-1/2" tall with gray hair, blue eyes and a light complexion, and that his residence subject to discharge was Philadelphia, and confirmed that he had sustained a gunshot wound of the left shoulder during the fighting at Spotsylvania in 1864.

Hospitalized in late July 1905 due to heart disease, McAnally died in the asylum hospital in Washington, D.C., on August 8, 1905.

== Medal of Honor citation ==
Rank and organization: Lieutenant, Company D, 69th Pennsylvania Infantry. Place and date: At Spotsylvania, Va., 12 May 1864. Entered service at: Philadelphia, Pa. Birth: Ireland. Date of issue: August 2, 1897.

Citation:

In a hand-to-hand encounter with the enemy captured a flag, was wounded in the act, but continued on duty until he received a second wound.

== See also ==
- List of Medal of Honor recipients
- List of American Civil War Medal of Honor recipients: M–P
