= Pat Loughrey =

Stephen Victor Patrick Loughrey (born 29 December 1955) was the Warden and CEO of Goldsmiths, University of London from 2010 to 2019.

== Early life ==
Loughrey was born in 1955 and grew up in County Donegal, Ireland. He lived in the townland of Ray (pronounced as 'Rai'), on the shores of Lough Swilly. He attended Loreto College in Milford, County Donegal. Loughrey went on to study at the University of Ulster (BA Hons Contemporary History), The Queen's University of Belfast (MA History) and Trent University, Ontario (Doctoral Research Fellowship in 1977).

== Career ==
He began his career as a teacher at St Colm's High School, Draperstown from 1978–84, becoming Head of the Languages department. He became a freelance broadcaster for UTV, BBC and RTÉ before joining the BBC as an education producer in 1984.

In 1987 he was responsible for the highly acclaimed radio series The People Of Ireland and edited the subsequent publication of the same name. He was also editor of the historical journal, Ulster Local Studies.

In 1988 he was appointed Head of Educational Broadcasting, BBC Northern Ireland.

He became Head of Programmes, responsible for all local and network output, in 1991 before becoming Controller, BBC Northern Ireland in 1994.

Loughrey was appointed Director, Nations and Regions, in May 2000. Holding overall responsibility for the BBC's television, radio and online programmes and services in Scotland, Wales, Northern Ireland and the 12 English Regions; he had overall editorial and managerial responsibility for BBC Scotland, Wales, Northern Ireland and English Regions and led 6,500 staff. In December 2009, Loughrey left his post after 25 years service in the BBC. In early 2010 he became Warden (Vice Chancellor) of Goldsmiths, University of London.

Loughrey holds a number of other honorary roles including; Visiting Professor at University of Ulster: School of Journalism & Media, European Television & Media Academy, Strasbourg - Member of Advisory Board / Tutor, University of London Institute, Paris - Vice Chairman and Hong Kong Advanced Institute for Cross Disciplinary Studies - Member of International Advisory Board.

== Recognition ==
He received the University of Ulster's Distinguished Graduate Award in 1997 and was awarded an Honorary Doctorate from Leeds Metropolitan University in 2009. He is a Fellow of The Radio Academy and a member of BAFTA.

Media offices
Preceded by	Controller: BBC Northern Ireland; 1994 - September 2000	Succeeded by Anna Carragher
