= Henry Downey =

Irish former dual player of Gaelic games

Personal information
- Born: 27 December 1966 (age 59) Lavey, County Londonderry, Northern Ireland
- Height: 5 ft 9 in (175 cm)

Sport
- Football Position: Centre back
- Hurling Position: Half-forward
Clubs
- Years: Club
- St Brigids GAC; Lavey
Club titles
	Football	Hurling
Derry titles	4	12
Ulster titles	2	0
All-Ireland titles	1	0
Inter-county
- Years: County
- 1988–2001 (F): Derry (F); Derry (H)
Inter-county titles
	Football	Hurling
Ulster Titles	2	0
All-Ireland Titles	1	0
League titles	4	
All-Stars	1	0

Henry Downey (born 27 December 1966) is a former dual player of Gaelic games, who played as a Gaelic footballer at senior level for the Derry county team in the late 1980s, 1990s and early 2000s, where he usually played in at centre half back.

Downey captained Derry to the 1993 All-Ireland SFC title. He won two Ulster Senior Football Championship (1993 and 1998) and four National League (1992, 1995, 1996 and 2000) medals during his inter-county career. He also played hurling.

== Playing career ==
Downey played club football and hurling with Erin's Own GAC Lavey, with whom he won the 1990–91 All-Ireland Senior Club Football Championship. He was one of very few players in Ireland to complete this unique double of club and inter-county All-Irelands and almost did the extreme rarity of winning both competitions in the same year in 1993, but Lavey were defeated in the All-Ireland club after winning the Ulster Senior Club Football Championship for the second time. Downey also won four Derry Senior Football Championship and 12 Derry Senior Hurling Championship medals with Lavey.

Some of his key attributes included his leadership qualities and his surging runs up the field from the half back line.

=== Inter-county ===
Downey was part of the Derry side which won four national leagues in eight years (1992, 1995, 1996 and 2000), captaining the team in 1992 and 1996. Downey and Derry finished runners-up to Offaly in the 1998 National League decider.

In addition to his All-Ireland Club medal and two Ulster Club Championship medals he had massive success at Derry Championship level. He won four Derry Senior Football Championship, two Derry Minor Football Championships and twelve Derry Senior Hurling Championships.

Downey won an All-star in 1993 at centre back and was named 1993 Texaco Footballer of the Year. He also won Footballer of the Year at the 1993 Ulster GAA Writer's Association Awards.

=== School/college ===
Downey attended school at St Patrick's College, Maghera, for whom he won two consecutive MacRory Cups (1984 and 1985). The school went on to be runners-up in the 1984 Hogan Cup final. He attended Queen's University Belfast, where he won the Sigerson Cup.

== Hurling career ==
Among Downey's hurling honours was winning the Ulster Under 21 Hurling Championship with Derry in 1986, defeating Antrim and Down along the way. He scored 0–12 against Antrim in the semi-final at Loughguile, with his brother Seamus scoring 1–3 in a 2–20 to 1–6 victory. They beat Down in the final after a reply; 3–9 to 1–2.

== Honours ==
=== Football ===
==== County ====
- All-Ireland Senior Football Championship - Winner (1): 1993 (c)
- National Football League - Winner (4): 1992, 1995, 1996, 2000
- National Football League - Runner up: 1998
- Ulster Senior Football Championship - Winner (2): 1993 (c), 1998
- Ulster Senior Football Championship - Runner up: 1992, 1997, 2000
- Dr McKenna Cup - Winner (1): 1993, 1999

==== Club ====
- All-Ireland Senior Club Football Championship - Winner (1): 1991
- Ulster Senior Club Football Championship - Winner (2): 1990, 1992
- Derry Senior Football Championship - Winner (4): 1988, 1990, 1992, 1993
- Derry Senior Football Championship - Runner up: 1998
- Derry Minor Football Championship - Winner (2): 1983, 1984
- Numerous underage awards

==== Province ====
- Railway Cup - Winner (?) – 1998, 2000 (captain), more?

==== School/College ====
- Sigerson Cup - Winner (1): 1990?
- MacRory Cup - Winner (2) – 1984, 1985
- Hogan Cup - Runner up: 1984

==== Individual ====
- Texaco Footballer of the Year: 1993
- All Star - Winner (1): 1993
- All Star - Nominated (runner up): 1992, more?
- Captain Derry Ulster and All-Ireland winning side: 1993
- Captain Derry National League winning sides: 1992, 1996
- Derry Senior football captain: 1991–1994, 1996

=== Hurling ===
==== County ====
- Ulster Under 21 Hurling Championship - Winner (1): 1986, 1987?????

==== Club ====
- Ulster Senior Club Hurling Championship - Runner up: 1986?, 1988?, 1994?, 1997?, 2001?
- Derry Senior Hurling Championship - Winner (12): 1985, 1986, 1988, 1990, 1991, 1992, 1994, 1995, 1997, 1999, 2001, 2002
- Derry Senior Hurling Championship - Runner up: 1993?, more?
- Numerous underage awards

==== Individual ====
- Combined Universities - Winner (1): Year?

Note: The above lists may be incomplete. Please add any other honours you know of.

Gaelic games
Preceded by Anthony Molloy (Donegal)	All-Ireland SFC winning captain 1993	Succeeded by D. J. Kane (Down)
Preceded by Mickey Linden (Down)	Texaco Footballer of the Year; 1993	Succeeded by Martin McHugh (Donegal)
Preceded by ?	Derry senior football captain 1991–1994	Succeeded by Tony Scullion
Preceded by Tony Scullion	Derry senior football captain 1996	Succeeded by Kieran McKeever
