= Stephen Gollogly =

Irish Gaelic footballer (1984–2026)

Personal information
- Nickname: Jinxy
- Born: 1984 or 1985
- Died: 21 July 2026 (aged 41)
- Occupation: Teacher (woodwork/technical graphics)

Sport
- Sport: Gaelic football
- Position: Centre forward/forward
Club
- Years: Club
- 2002–2023: Carrickmacross Emmets
Inter-county
Years	County	Apps (scores)
2004–2017	Monaghan	133 (3–71)
Inter-county titles
- Ulster titles: 2
- NFL: 3

Stephen Gollogly (1984/1985 – 21 July 2026) was an Irish Gaelic footballer who played at club level for Carrickmacross Emmets and at senior inter-county level for the Monaghan county team. Typically positioned as a forward, Gollogly made 133 competitive appearances for Monaghan between 2004 and 2017.

== Playing career ==
=== College ===
Gollogly attended Patrician High School in Carrickmacross, where he competed in Ulster Colleges football. During his secondary school career, he won two Ulster Colleges titles, most notably the 2000 under-16 Rannafast Cup. He also featured on the school's senior team that reached the semi-final of the 2003 MacRory Cup, losing to eventual winners St Patrick's College, Maghera. That year, he was also selected at left half-forward on the Ulster Colleges 2003 All-Star team.

=== Club ===
At club level, Gollogly represented Carrickmacross Emmets from juvenile ranks through to the senior team. In 2008, he was part of the Emmets team that won their first Monaghan Senior Football League title. He retired from club football in 2023. He coached the club's youth team.

=== Inter-county ===
Gollogly made his senior inter-county debut for Monaghan in 2004. Over a 13-year senior career, he accumulated 133 competitive appearances and scored a career total of 3–71, including 1–25 in 42 Senior Football Championship games.

In 2005, Gollogly was a member of the Monaghan side that won the National Football League Division 2 title and reached the Ulster Senior Football Championship final, losing narrowly to Tyrone. He featured in the 2007 All-Ireland SFC quarter-final, in which Monaghan lost to Kerry by a single point.

Gollogly won his first Ulster SFC medal in 2013, helping Monaghan end a 25-year title drought. That same season, Monaghan won the National Football League Division 3 title. He added a second Division 2 league title in 2014 and a second Ulster SFC title in 2015.

Gollogly retired from inter-county football in December 2017.

== Personal life and death ==
Gollogly was from Carrickmacross. Outside of Gaelic games, he worked as a secondary school teacher specializing in woodwork and technical graphics.

Gollogly died from undisclosed causes on 21 July 2026, at the age of 41. His parents, brother, wife and four children survived him. Gollogly's funeral was announced for 27 July. Instead of flowers, his family requested that any donations be sent to the charity Féileacáin.

== Honours ==
Monaghan

- Ulster Senior Football Championship (2): 2013, 2015
- National Football League, Division 2 (2): 2005, 2014
- National Football League, Division 3 (1): 2013

Individual / Schools

- Ulster Colleges All-Star (1): 2003
- Rannafast Cup: 2000
