= 2008 O'Byrne Cup =

Tournament details
- Province: Leinster
- Year: 2008
- Trophy: O'Byrne Cup

Winners
- Champions: Dublin (7th win)
- Manager: Paul Caffrey
- Captain: Alan Brogan

The 2008 O'Byrne Cup was a Gaelic football competition played by the teams of Leinster GAA. The competition differs from the Leinster Senior Football Championship as it also features further education colleges and the winning team does not progress to another tournament at All-Ireland level. Last years winners of the O'Byrne Cup were Dublin. The first game was between defending champions Dublin and Wicklow, Dublin won the game comfortably.

Adrian Reid made his senior inter-county debut for Louth against DCU.

== O'Byrne Cup ==
First round 5/6/9/10 January 2008
Wicklow	0-09
Dublin	2-12
Westmeath	2-08
D.I.T.	0-12
Wexford	1-14
Laois	0-14
Carlow	3-13
Kilkenny	1-06
Kildare	0-07
Longford	0-09
Offaly	5-24
A.I.T	0-09
Meath	2-11
U.C.D.	0-15
Louth	0-11
D.C.U.	1-14

Quarter-finals; 13 January 2008
Dublin	1-16
Westmeath	0-06
Wexford	0-11
Carlow	1-13
Meath	1-06
Longford	0-14
Offaly	1-07
D.C.U.	0-15

Semi-finals; 20/22/27 January 2008
Dublin	1-15; 1-15(R)
Carlow	2-12; 1-07(R)
Longford	1-16
D.C.U.	0-10

Final; 9 February 2008
Dublin	2-12
1-14

=== First round ===
The eight winning teams from the first round of the O'Byrne Cup go on to qualify for the quarter-finals of the tournament. The losers of the first round go on to the O'Byrne Shield quarter finals.

5 January 2008

Dublin	2-12 - 0-09	Wicklow
B Brogan 0-5 (0-3f), B Kennedy 1-1 (0-1f), P Burke 1-0, A Brogan 0-2, C Moran, D O'Mahony, D Lally, J Sherlock 0-1 each.	Report	P Earls 0-3 (0-2f), S Hurley, JP Kelly (0-2f) 0-2 each, T Gill, S Furlong 0-1 each.

Parnell Park
6 January 2008

Westmeath	2-08 - 0-12	D.I.T.
T Cleary 0-05, M Greene 0-02, M Gorman, D Bannon, A Mangan 0-01 each.	Report	K McMenamin, M Vaughan 0-03 each, D Munnelly 0-02, J Donegan, S Ryan, A Kilcoyne, C Ward 0-01 each.

Mullingar
6 January 2008

Wexford	1-14 - 0-14	Laois
M Forde 1-06, S Roche, B Brosnan 0-03 each, P Curtis 0-02.	Report	M Tierney 0-08, D Brennan 0-03, B Fitzgerald 0-02, B Sheehan 0-01.

Wexford
6 January 2008

Carlow	3-13 - 1-06	Kilkenny
S Rea 1-06, E McCormack, J Amond 1-00 each, B Carbery, M Carpenter, J Ryan, D Byrne, R Walker, R Sinnott, J Murphy 0-01 each.	Report	P Maher 0-04, E Brennan 1-00, D Brennan 0-02.

Carlow
6 January 2008

Kildare	0-07 - 0-09	Longford
M Conway 0-2 2f, K Ennis, A Smyth, M Hartnett, J Doyle, T Rossiter 0-1 each.	Report	F McGee 0-4 3f, 1’45, B Kavanagh 0-3 1f, G Murphy, E Farrell 0-1 each.

Newbridge
6 January 2008

Offaly	5-24 - 0-09	Athlone IT
N McNamee 2-07, J O'Hara 3-03, D Egan 0-04, K Casey 0-03, N Smith, J Reynolds 0-02 each, P McConway, T Deehan, B Darby 0-01 each.	Report	J Coughlan 0-04, R Galligan, D Glennon 0-02 each, J Durkan 0-01.

Tullamore
9 January 2008

Meath	2-11 0-15	UCD
G Reilly 1-02, J Queeney 0-03, N Farrell 1-00, N Mooney 0-02, P Curran, E Reilly, C King, C McGuinness 0-01 each.	Report	J O'Loughlin 0-05, S Lennon 0-04, D Gilhooley 0-03, K Kelly, C O'Sullivan, N Corkery 0-01 each.

Páirc Tailteann
10 January 2008

Louth	0-11 1-14	D.C.U.
B White 0-04, M Stanfield, R Carroll 0-2 each, P Matthews, D Clarke, D Finnegan 0-1 each.	Report	S Johnston 0-05, C Mortimer 0-4, C Cregg 1-00, S Smith 0-02, D Kelly, M McElhinney, R Flanagan 0-01 each.

Darver

=== Quarter-finals ===
13 January 2008

Dublin	1-16 - 1-06	Westmeath
B Brogan 0-5 (0-2f), D O'Mahony 1-2 (0-1f), J Sherlock 0-4, D Lally 0-2, P Brogan, S Ryan, J O'Brien 0-1 each.	Report	F Wilson 0-4 (0-1f), M Greene 1-1, D Dolan 0-1.

Parnell Park
13 January 2008

Wexford	0-11 - 1-13	Carlow
M Forde 0-04, B Brosnan 0-03, C Byrne 0-02, K Kennedy, A Flynn 0-01.	Report	S Rea 0-06, E McCormack 1-01, M Carpenter 0-03, R Walker, B Carbery, JJ Smith 0-01.

Wexford
13 January 2008

Meath	1-06 0-14	Longford
N Mooney 1-0, S Bray 0-2, J McQuenney, J Sheridan, P Curran, P Byrne 0-1 each.	Report	F McGee 0-4, B Kavanagh 0-3, E Farrell 0-2, C Flynn, P Dowd, D Farrell, N Farrell, L Keenan 0-01 each.

Navan
13 January 2008

Offaly	1-07 - 0-15	D.C.U.
C Mortimer, S Johnston 0-05 each, D Kelly 0-02, S Smith, C Cregg, C Rodgers 0-01 each.	Report	J O'Hara 0-04, A Mulhall 1-00, N McNamee 0-02, J Reynolds 0-01.

Tullamore

=== Semi-finals ===
22 January 2008

Dublin	1-15 - 2-12	Carlow
B Brogan 1-5 (0-3f), A Brogan, B Cullen, K Bonner 0-2 each, S O’Shaughnessy, P McMahon, J O’Brien (0-1f), G Cullen 0-1 each.	Report	E McCormack 1-5 (0-5f, 1-0 pen), J Murphy 1-0, R Walker 0-2, J Ryan, B Carberry, A Curran, P Walsh, M Nolan 0-1 each.

Parnell Park
20 January 2008

Longford	1-16 - 0-10	D.C.U.
Brian Kavanagh 1-4 (0-1f), Francis McGee 0-6 (0-5f), Colm Flynn, Paddy Dowd, Shane Mulligan, Arthur O'Connor, Liam Keenan, Peter Masterson 0-1 each.	Report	Conor Mortimer 0-5 (0-2f), Ronan Flanagan 0-2, Shane Smith, Cathal Cregg, Seanie Johnston 0-1 each.

Longford
27 January 2008
Replay

Dublin	1-15 - 1-07	Carlow
J O'Brien 0-08, P McMahon 1-01, B Kennedy, C Keaney 0-02 each, D Lally, K Bonner 0-01 each.	Report	J Murphy 1-02, E McCormack 0-03, R Walker, R Sinnott 0-01 each.

Dr Cullen Park

=== Final ===
9 February 2008

Longford	1-14 - 2-12 A.E.T.	Dublin
D Sheridan; D Brady, D Masterson, D Reilly; K Mulligan (0-2), A O'Connor, N Farrell; P Dowd (0-1), E Farrell; D Bardend (0-1), D Farrell (0-2), P Berry; B Kavanagh (1-4), P Bardend (0-1), F McGee (0-3 (0-2f))	Report	J Leonard; D Henry, R McConnell, S O'Shaughnessy; P McMahon, P Casey, D Murray, E Fennell, S Ryan, B Cullen, A Brogan, B McManamon (0-1), J O'Brien (0-3 (0-2f)), B Brogan (0-7 (0-5f)), K Bonner (0-1).

Parnell Park

== O'Byrne Shield ==
The 8 losing first round competitors of the O'Byrne Cup went on to contest the O'Byrne shield. The final of the Shield was postponed from its original date of 9 February 2008, due to a family bereavement of one of the players, and a National Football League match between the two teams doubled as the O'Byrne Shield final. This game ended in a draw, and the decision was taken not to have a replay.

Quarter-finals; 13/20 January 2008		Semi-finals; 20/28 January 2008		Final; 13 April 2008
Kildare	0-14
U.C.D.	0-09	Kildare	1-09
Louth	1-12	Louth	0-07
A.I.T.	1-10			Kildare	1-10
Laois	5-23			Laois	0-13
Kilkenny	1-04	Laois	2-17
Wicklow	3-10	Wicklow	2-12
D.I.T.	1-09

== See also ==
- 2008 Dr McKenna Cup
