= Orla Chennaoui =

Northern Irish television journalist

Orla Chennaoui (née Heron) (born 13 November 1978) is a Northern Irish television journalist and former all-Ireland triple jump champion. Chennaoui was born in Draperstown, County Londonderry in Northern Ireland. After completing a degree in Law and French at Queen's University Belfast, she took a postgraduate diploma in journalism at Edinburgh Napier University. While in Edinburgh Chennaoui began her journalism career, working in print-journalism at Scotland on Sunday and the Edinburgh Evening News.

Chennaoui moved into broadcast journalism at 2 Ten FM, a local radio station in Reading, Berkshire. A move into regional television news followed, working on the Meridian West news service at ITV Meridian and the ITV News network, based in Southampton. She returned to Scotland with a role at STV and Scotland Today.

In 2005, she joined Sky News as Northern Ireland correspondent. In 2010 Chennaoui made a move into sports broadcasting for Sky Sports specialising in cycling; she was also Sky Sports' principal correspondent for the 2012 and 2016 Olympic Games.

In 2019, Chennaoui left Sky to join Eurosport as the lead presenter for the station's coverage of cycling events. Eurosport became TNT Sports from February 2025.

== Personal ==
She is married to Moroccan-born Mourad Chennaoui; they have two children and live in London and Amsterdam.
