= Damien Freeman =

Monaghan Gaelic footballer

Personal information
- Born: Magheracloone, County Monaghan

Sport
- Sport: Gaelic Football
- Position: Centre Back
Club
- Years: Club
- 1997-2011: Magheracloone Mitchell's
Club titles
- Monaghan titles: 1
Inter-county
- Years: County
- 2000-2011: Monaghan
Inter-county titles
- NFL: 1

Damien Freeman is Gaelic footballer from Magheracloone, County Monaghan. He plays for Magheracloone Mitchell's and at senior level for the Monaghan county team.

Damien is a graduate from the minor and under-21 inter-county ranks, and has always been an ace in the Monaghan pack with his quality play. He has experience of captaining a national title winning side at croke park, having led the Monaghan side from right half back to the 2005 Allianz National League Division Two crown. One of the giants of the Magheracloone team that made history in October 2004 with a first county senior title in the history of the club. He also led the Monaghan team to their first Ulster Senior Football Championship final in 19 years in 2007. Damien's team-mates in the County side include Shane Duffy, a fellow Mitchell's player, and his younger brother Tomás Freeman, who was the county's top scorer in 2007.

He has made 26 championship appearances as of 17 May 2008.
