= Michael McIver =

Derry Gaelic footballer

Personal information
- Native name: Mícheál Mac Íomhair (Irish)
- Nickname: Lloyd
- Born: 2 March 1986 (age 40) Ballinderry, County Londonderry, Northern Ireland
- Occupation: Teacher
- Height: 5 ft 9 in (175 cm)

Sport
- Sport: Gaelic football
- Position: Half back
Club
- Years: Club
- ?–present: Ballinderry
Club titles
- Derry titles: 2
Inter-county*
Years	County	Apps (scores)
2007–present	Derry	2 (0–01)
Inter-county titles
- NFL: 1
- *Inter County team apps and scores correct as of 11:46, 8 January 2009 (UTC); Championship games only.

Michael "Lloyd" McIver (born 2 March 1986) is a Gaelic footballer who plays for the Derry county team, with whom he won a National League title. McIver plays his club football for Ballinderry Shamrocks, and has won the Derry Senior Football Championship twice with the club.

For both club and county McIver usually plays in half back line, but has also played corner back.

== Early life ==
McIver has been managed by his father Brian in the past.

== Football career ==
=== Inter-county ===
McIver represented Derry at Minor and Under 21 level. He was captain of the Under 21 side in 2007. He was first called up to the Derry Senior football panel during the 2007 Championship for cover, but didn't play in any games. He worked his way into the Derry team in the 2008 National League campaign.

He was part of the Derry team that won the 2008 National League, when Derry defeated Kerry in the final. His championship debut came later in 2008 against Donegal, who were ironically managed by his father Brian.

==== Championship games ====
#	Date	Competition	Venue	Opponent	Result	Score	Mins	Match report
1	1 June 2008	Ulster SFC QF	MacCumhaill Park, Ballybofey	Donegal	1–14 : 1–12	0–00	35	,,
2	21 June 2008	Ulster SFC SF	Healy Park, Omagh	Fermanagh	1–09 : 1–11	0–01	58	,

Notes:

- Under "Result", Derry scoreline is recorded first.

=== Club ===
McIver won his first Derry Senior Football Championship in 2006. He won a second Derry Championship medal with Ballinderry in 2008. In both years the club also reached the final of the Ulster Senior Club Football Championship.

== Honours ==
=== Inter-county ===
- National Football League:
  - Winner (1): 2008

=== Club ===
- Ulster Senior Club Football Championship:
  - Runner up: 2006, 2008
- Ulster Senior Club Football League:
  - Winner (1): 2008
- Derry Senior Football Championship:
  - Winner (2): 2006, 2008
- Derry Senior Football League:
  - Winner (3/4): 2005?, 2006, 2007, 2008
- Numerous underage competitions

=== Individual ===
- Derry Under 21 captain: 2007
