= Ciarán Mullan =

Derry Gaelic footballer

Personal information
- Native name: Ciarán Ó Maoláin (Irish)
- Nickname: Banty
- Born: 22 March 1984 (age 42) Drumsurn, County Londonderry, Northern Ireland
- Occupation: Electrician
- Height: 5 ft 9 in (175 cm)

Sport
- Sport: Gaelic football
- Position: Corner forward
Club
- Years: Club
- 200x–present: Drumsurn
Inter-county
- Years: County
- 2004–present: Derry
Inter-county titles
- Ulster titles: 1
- All-Irelands: 1
- NFL: 1

Ciarán Mullan (22 March 1984) is a Gaelic footballer who plays for the Derry county team, with whom he has won a National League title. He plays his club football for St Matthew's Drumsurn. He plays in the forward line for both club and county.

== Football career ==
=== Inter-county ===
Mullan was part of the Derry Minor side that won the 2002 Ulster Minor and All-Ireland Minor Championships. He was a member of the Derry Under 21 team that finished runners-up in the 2004 Ulster Under 21 Championship.

He made his Derry Senior debut in 2004, but did not make his Championship debut until Round 2 of the Qualifiers against Kildare in July 2006. Mullan missed most of the 2007 season, due to being in the United States, but has returned for the 2008 campaign. He helped Derry reach the 2008 Dr McKenna Cup final, where they were defeated by Down. He was part of the Derry team that won the 2008 National League where Derry beat Kerry in the final.

=== Club ===
Mullan plays club football for Drumsurn. While in the United States in 2007 he played for the Four Provinces team (from Philadelphia) that won the New York Senior Football Championship.

== Honours ==
=== Inter-county ===
- National Football League:
  - Winner (1): 2008
- Dr McKenna Cup:
  - Runner up: 2008, more?
- Ulster Under-21 Football Championship:
  - Runner up: 2004
- All-Ireland Minor Football Championship:
  - Winner (1): 2002
- Ulster Minor Football Championship:
  - Winner (1): 2002

=== Club ===
- New York Senior Football Championship:
  - Winner (1): 2007

Note: The above lists may be incomplete. Please add any other honours you know of.
