= Liam Hinphey =

Irish hurler and Gaelic footballer

Liam Óg Hinphey
Personal information
- Born: 15 August 1984 (age 42) Dungiven, County Londonderry, Northern Ireland
- Occupation: Student
- Height: 6 ft 1 in (185 cm)

Sport
- Football Position: Right half back
- Hurling Position: Center half back
Clubs
- Years: Club
- ?-Present ?-Present: Dungiven (F); Kevin Lynch's (H)
Club titles
	Football	Hurling
Derry titles	-	5
Inter-county
- Years: County
- 2006- 2003-2008 2009-: Derry (F); Derry (H)
Inter-county titles
	Football	Hurling
Ulster Titles	0	-0
All-Ireland Titles	0	0
League titles	1	0
All-Stars	0	0

Liam Hinphey (Irish: Liam Óg Ó hAnfaidh);(born 15 August 1984) was a dual player of Gaelic games who played Gaelic football and hurling for the Derry GAA, with whom he has won the National Football League title and Nicky Rackard Cup (hurling).

Hinphey played his club football for St Canice's GAC Dungiven and still plays club hurling as a Goalkeeper for Kevin Lynch's, with whom he has won five Derry Senior Hurling Championships.

== Early and family life ==
Hinphey is from Dungiven in County Londonderry, Northern Ireland. His late father (also Liam) was from the hurling stronghold of Kilkenny in the Republic of Ireland, playing for the James Stephens club, one of the most successful hurling clubs of all time and had a big influence on his hurling career. Liam Óg's brother Kevin also played hurling for Derry. He is a cousin of two-time Derry All Star Joe Brolly.

== Football career ==
=== Inter-county ===
Hinphey was first called up to the Derry Senior football panel in November 2005 for the 2006 season. He was part of the Derry team that won the 2008 National League where Derry beat Kerry in the final. Hinphey missed the first round of the 2008 Ulster Senior Football Championship against Donegal with a pelvic injury (osteo pubis), and was expected to be sidelined for the rest of the season. However, early detection and appropriate treatment saw him make a quicker than expected recovery and made his club return in the Derry Championship against Bellaghy on 1 July. He has opted out of the 2009 panel, as he will be traveling around Australia for six months from March 2009 to September 2009.

=== Club ===
Hinphey played his club football for St Canice's Dungiven and won the Derry ACFL Division 2 in 2007. He returned from Australia in late July in time for the latter stages of the 2009 Derry Championship.

=== School/college ===
A relative late-comer to football, Hinphey won the MacRory and Hogan Cups in 2003 with St. Patricks's Maghera.

== Hurling ==
=== Inter-county ===
Hinphey won the Ulster Minor Hurling Championship with Derry minors in 2001. He made his Senior Derry debut when he was 18 years old against Kerry in 2003. Hinphey has represented Derry, Ulster and even captained Ireland at Under 21 level in hurling. He was part of Derry's 2006 Nicky Rackard Cup winning side. He opted out of the Derry hurling side for the 2008 season to concentrate on football. He returned to the hurling panel in 2009, but was only available for the first two rounds of the National Hurling League, as he decided to travel Australia from March. Having arrived in Sydney he signed for the Sydney Shamrocks Hurling club and played brilliantly at centre back as they won the first NSW competition of the year, the Central Coast tournament.

While travelling in Australia he played for ?.

=== Club ===
Hinphey had a highly successful underage career with Kevin Lynchs, for example winning the Ulster Minor Club Hurling Championship with the club in 2002. This success has continued at Senior level. Hinphey has won five Derry hurling Championships with the club (2003, 2004, 2006, 2007 and 2008). He returned from Australia in late July in time for the latter stages of the 2009 Derry Championship.

=== School/college ===
Hinphey won the Mageenan Cup on 1/2? occasions with St Pat's.

=== Province ===
Hinphey has represented Ulster in the Railway Cup and was captain of the province in 2009.

== Honours ==
=== Football ===
==== Inter-county ====
- National Football League:
  - Winner (1): 2008
- Dr McKenna Cup:
  - Runner up: 2008

==== Club ====
- Derry ACFL Division 2:
  - Winner (1): 2007
- Underage competitions

==== School ====
- MacRory Cup:
  - Winner (1): 2003
- Hogan Cup:
  - Winner (1): 2003

=== Hurling ===
==== County ====
- Nicky Rackard Cup:
  - Winner (1): 2006
- Ulster Senior Hurling Championship:
  - Runner up: 2003
- Ulster Under-21 Hurling Championship:
  - Runner up: 2003
- Ulster Minor Hurling Championship:
  - Winner (1): 2001
  - Runner up: 2002, more?

==== Club ====
- Ulster Senior Club Hurling Championship:
  - Runner up: 2003, 2006, 2007
- Derry Senior Hurling Championship:
  - Winner (5): 2003, 2004, 2006, 2007, 2008 (Captain.)
  - Runner up: 2005
- Numerous underage awards

==== School ====
- Mageean Cup:
  - Winner (1/2?): 2001, 2003?

==== Individual ====
- Ulster Colleges Hurling All-Star:
  - Winner (1?): 2003

Note: The above lists may be incomplete. Please add any other honours you know of.
