= Tomás Freeman =

Monaghan Gaelic footballer

Personal information
- Nickname: Tommy
- Born: Magheracloone, County Monaghan
- Occupation: Carpenter
- Height: 5 ft 11 in (180 cm)

Sport
- Sport: Gaelic football
- Position: Corner forward
Club
- Years: Club
- 1997-: Magheracloone Mitchell's
Club titles
- Monaghan titles: 1
Inter-county
- Years: County
- 2001-2013: Monaghan
Inter-county titles
- Ulster titles: 1
- NFL: 1
- All Stars: 1

Tomás "Tommy" Freeman is an Irish Gaelic footballer from Magheracloone, County Monaghan. He plays at senior level for the Monaghan county team. He received an All Star Award in 2007. At a club level, Freeman plays for the Magheracloone Mitchells.

== Personal life ==
Freeman is a carpenter by profession. His brother Damien also played for Magheracloone and Monaghan.

== Playing career ==
=== Inter-county ===
In 2005 Freeman helped Monaghan win the National League Division 2 title. He scored 2–03 against Meath in the final. He also won an Irish News Ulster All-Star award for his performances that year.

In 2007 Freeman helped Monaghan reach the Ulster Senior Football Championship final, where they lost by two points to Tyrone (1–15 to 1–13). Freeman was top scorer in that year's Ulster Championship a total of 0–12. Monaghan however went on to reach the All-Ireland Championship quarter-final, where they met reigning champions Kerry. He cut his thumb in a work-related accident a few days before the match and he had to get a cast on, which was only removed two days before the match. He did however play in the game and scored 1-02, which Kerry won 1–12 to 11. Freeman finished the Championship with 4-22, the second highest scorer behind Cork's James Masters. He was awarded an All Star award for his performances that year and also named Irish News Ulster Player of the year.

Freeman continued to play in 2008 for Monaghan. While Monaghan was not as successful as the year before, Thomas earned another All Star Award. Monaghan were often criticized for their heavy dependence on him and teammate Paul Finlay. This was a disappointing year as they once again lost out to Kerry in the All-Ireland qualifiers, a match where Freeman himself scored.

In 2009, Monaghan made it to the Division 2 league final, where they played Cork. Freeman was supposed to receive an eight-week ban for trying to hit a Derry player in the Ulster Quarter Final. An appeal caused this to be shortend to two days. He missed games against Armagh and Derry. Monaghan would beat Armagh.

=== International Rules ===
Freeman has represented Ireland in the International Rules Series.

=== Province ===
Freeman has played for Ulster in the Railway Cup. He has won the competition on ? occasions with the province, including in 2007 where he scored 1–01 in the final against Munster.
