= PJ Ward =

Irish Gaelic footballer

Personal information
- Born: Tullamore, Ireland
- Height: 1.83 m (6 ft 0 in)

Sport
- Sport: Gaelic football
- Position: Centre forward
Clubs
- Years: Club
- 1999-2007 2007-2011: Kilbeggan Shamrocks; Shamrocks
Inter-county
- Years: County
- 2001-2004 2004-2005 2005-2007 2007-2011: Westmeath; New York; Westmeath; Offaly

PJ Ward is a Gaelic footballer from County Westmeath, Ireland. He played inter-county football with three different counties in the 2000s. He first made his name with Westmeath underage teams helping them to win the Leinster Minor Championship in 2000, scoring 1-04 in the final against Dublin, he then played with New York in the Connacht Championship, before joining up with Offaly.
