= 2008 Dr McKenna Cup =

Tournament details
- Province: Ulster
- Year: 2008

The 2008 Dr McKenna Cup was a Gaelic football competition played under the auspices of Ulster GAA. The tournament was won by Down. They defeated Derry in the final. Down won despite not winning any of their games in the 2007 edition of the competition, and also had not won any of their games in the 2007 National Football League.

== Summary ==
In 2008, the competition was compacted entirely into the month of January. This led to several considerations for all participants, because the students in the university teams had exams in January, while the county teams, who would not have played together for up to six months, had to play three matches in a week. In spite of this, the university teams seemed to have a slight advantage, causing several upsets early in the competition.

Donegal knocked out holders Tyrone.

In the 2008 semi-finals Derry defeated Fermanagh and Down defeated Cavan.

== Teams ==
Counties

- Antrim
- Armagh
- Cavan
- Derry
- Donegal
- Down
- Fermanagh
- Monaghan
- Tyrone

Universities

- Queen's University Belfast
- St Mary's University College
- University of Ulster, Jordanstown

== See also ==
- 2008 O'Byrne Cup
