= Moneyneany =

Village in County Londonderry, Northern Ireland

Coordinates: 54.817°N 6.840°W

Moneyneany: Irish: Móin na nIonadh
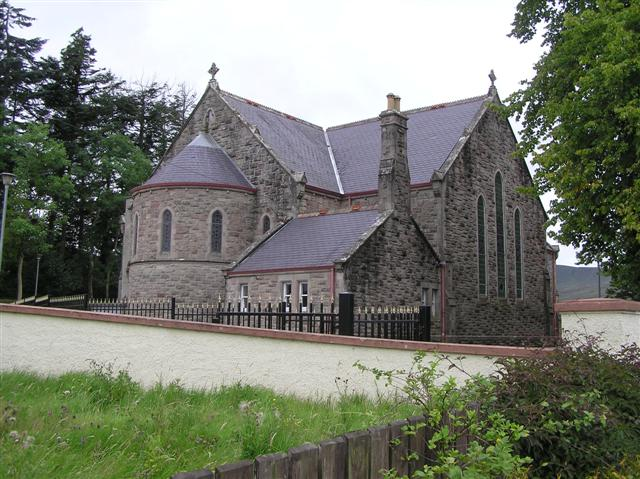
- St Eugene's Roman Catholic church in Moneyneany

- Location within Northern Ireland
- Population: 1,369 (2001 Census)
- Irish grid reference: H8583
- District: Mid-Ulster
- County: County Londonderry
- Country: Northern Ireland
- Sovereign state: United Kingdom
- Post town: MAGHERAFELT
- Postcode district: BT
- Dialling code: 028
- Police: Northern Ireland
- Fire: Northern Ireland
- Ambulance: Northern Ireland
- UK Parliament: Mid Ulster
- NI Assembly: Mid Ulster

Moneyneany or Moneyneena (locally [ˌmʌniˈnini], [ˌmʌniˈniːnə], and [ˌmʌniˈiːnə]; from Irish Móin na nIonadh, meaning 'bog of wonders') is a small village and townland in County Londonderry, Northern Ireland. In the 2001 Census it had a population of 162. It is situated within the Mid-Ulster District. The Douglas River, a tributary to the Moyola River, flows through the village.

== People ==
Tony Scullion, Gaelic Football and Hurling player for Ballinascreen and Derry, was born in Moneyneany. Colonel Brian O'Neill, one of Owen Roe O'Neill's three sons who returned to Ireland with him after serving under him on the continent in 1641, was resident at Moydamlaght in the 1663 Hearth Money Rolls.
