= Dermot McBride =

Derry Gaelic footballer

Personal information
- Born: 26 June 1988 (age 38) Derry, Northern Ireland
- Height: 1.81 m (5 ft 11 in)

Sport
- Sport: Gaelic football
- Position: Left Corner Back
Club
- Years: Club
- 2005-: Ballinascreen
Inter-county
- Years: County
- 2008-: Derry
Inter-county titles
- Ulster titles: 0
- All-Irelands: 0
- NFL: 0
- All Stars: 0

Dermot McBride (born 26 June 1988) is a Gaelic footballer who plays for St Colm's GAC Ballinascreen and has also represented the Derry county team. He grew up in Straw, outside Draperstown. In 2005 he was a member of the Ballinascreen Derry Minor Championship winning team and, the following year, was made captain. Dermot made his club senior debut at the age of 18, and in his first full season he shared the title of 'senior player of the year' with his elder brother Michael, who also played for Derry.

== Inter-county career ==
Dermot made his county senior debut at the age of 19, on 13 January 2008 against Fermanagh in the Dr McKenna Cup.
