= Glenviggan =

Townland in County Londonderry, Northern Ireland

Coordinates: 54.742°N 6.926°W

Glenviggan is a townland in County Londonderry, Northern Ireland with a population of 43 people. In 1911, the population was 77.

Glenviggan is in the Civil Parish of Ballynascreen, the Barony of Loughinsholin and County of Londonderry. Glenviggan has an area of about 2.7 square miles, making it one of the smallest in Ulster. Census records for the 1901 and 1911 censuses are available.

The Irish name for Glenviggan is Gleann-Bheichcean, or Gleann Bhig Fhinne, for the now-drained Loch Beigfhine (pronounced "Glen Vigan"), or "after St. Veggan who was a follower of St. Colmcille," but this folk etymology is derided. The little-known St. Becan of Cork (a/k/a Veggan or Beccán) is supposed to be the origin of Bigín's glen, but even the sources claiming that note the alternate, and more likely, origin as "the little glen" from a 1821 original source. Also, there is a hill near Glenviggan named Crocanlocha ("which means 'the lough hill', referring to the lough which was formally there") and "the Gaelic words bhig gleann [means] 'small glen'."

Although there is evidence of human settlement from the Bronze Age, the agricultural valley was virtually uninhabited until c. 1832. Bog iron ore was mined there in the mid-19th century, which was red enough to be suitable for paint.

== See also ==
- List of townlands in County Londonderry
