= 2007 All-Ireland Senior Football Championship =

Football championship

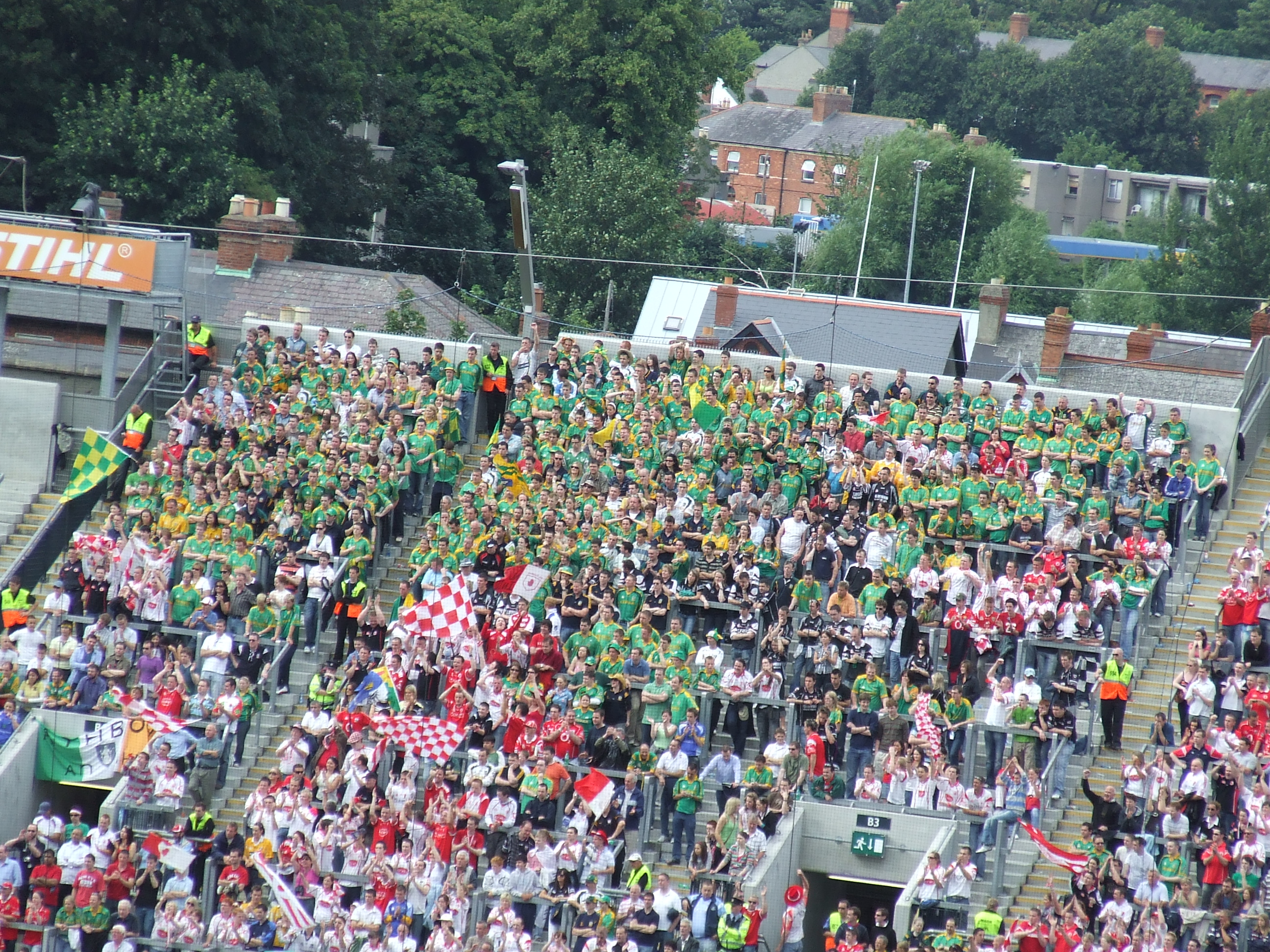

Championship details
- Dates: 13 May – 16 September 2007
- Teams: 33

All-Ireland Champions
- Winning team: Kerry (35th win)
- Captain: Declan O'Sullivan
- Manager: Pat O'Shea

All-Ireland Finalists
- Losing team: Cork
- Captain: Derek Kavanagh
- Manager: Billy Morgan

Provincial Champions
- Munster: Kerry
- Leinster: Dublin
- Ulster: Tyrone
- Connacht: Sligo

Championship statistics
- No. matches played: 56
- Goals total: 101 (1.80 per game)
- Points total: 1409 (25.16 per game)
- Top Scorer: James Masters (3–30)
- Player of the Year: Marc Ó Sé

The 2007 Bank of Ireland All-Ireland Senior Football Championship, was a Gaelic football competition in Ireland, and was the most significant and prestigious competition in the sport held that year. It began on 13 May 2007, with the final game took place for Sunday, 16 September. Kerry were the defending champions, as well as the most successful team in the competition. Donegal entered the Championship as the unbeaten National League champions, as well as having been runners-up to Tyrone in the 2007 Dr. McKenna Cup.

The draw for the provincial championships took place on 4 November 2006.

Kerry retained their championship, the first team to do so since Cork won back-to-back titles in 1989 and 1990. The final was the first occasion when two teams from Munster, Kerry and Cork, competed, although not the first with two teams from the same Province. That distinction belongs to the 2003 Championship where two counties from Ulster competed. The final score was Kerry 3–13 Cork 1-09.

Cork's James Masters was the top scorer, with 3 goals and 30 points (3–30: a total of 39 points). He also held the record for the highest individual tally in a match, getting 2–07 (13) in the game against Tipperary.

== Results ==
=== Munster Senior Football Championship ===
Players names followed by a number indicates their scoring tally. f=free kick, '45'=45m kick, sline=sideline ball, p=goal scored from penalty. SO=Sent Off

Quarter-finals
Waterford	1–06
Clare	0–07
Cork	2–14
Limerick	0–07

Semi-finals
Waterford	0–04
Kerry	2–15
Tipperary	0–10
Cork	2–18

Final
Cork	1–13
Kerry	1–15

==== Quarter-finals ====
20 May 2007
Quarter-final

Waterford	1–06 – 0–07	Clare
G Power (1-01), B Wall (0-03), A Hubbord, L Ó Lionáin (0-01 each)	Report	D Russell (0-02), E Talty, S Hickey, R Donnelly, L Healy (0-01 each)

Fraher Field, Dungarvan

20 May 2007
Quarter-final

Cork	2–14 – 0–07	Limerick
J. Masters 1–7 (4f); N. O’Leary 1–0; K. O’Sullivan 0–3 (1f); G. Spillane, F. Gould, N. Murphy, P. O’Neill 0–1 each.	Report	M. Reidy 0–4 (4f); J. Cooke 0–2; P. Ranahan 0–1.

Páirc Uí Chaoimh, Cork

==== Semi-finals ====
3 June 2007
Semi-final

Waterford	0–04 – 2–15	Kerry
M Ahearne 0–2, B Wall, Hubbard (0–1 each)	Report	E Brosnan (2–2), C Cooper (0–5, 0-2f), P Galvin, P O'Connor (0–2 each), M O'Se, T O'Se, S O'Sullivan, M F Russell (0–1 each)

Fraher Field, Dungarvan

3 June 2007
Semi-final

Cork	2–18 – 0–10	Tipperary
J Masters 2-07 (4f, 1x'45'), D O'Connor 0–3 (1f, 1x'45'), D Kavanagh, P O'Neill (0–2 each), M Shields, C McCarthy, K MacMahon, F Gould (0–1 each)	Report	D Browne (0–5, 2f), D O'Brien, B Grogan (0–2 each), C Morrissey (0–1)

Gaelic Grounds, Limerick
Referee: E. Murtagh (Longford)

==== Final ====
1 July 2007
Final

Kerry	1–15 – 1–13	Cork
MF Russell (0–6, 5f), C Cooper (1–2), D O'Sullivan (0–3), K Donaghy (0–2), E Brosnan, S O'Sullivan (0–1 each)	Report	D O'Connor (1–4, 4f), J Masters (0–4, 2f, 1xsline), M Cussen (0–2), N Murphy, P O'Neill, K MacMahon (0–1 each).

FitzGerald Stadium, Killarney
Attendance: 31,420
Referee: Marty Duffy (Sligo)

Top scorer: J Masters (Cork) 3–18

=== Leinster Senior Football Championship ===
1st round
Louth	2–18
Wicklow	0–11
Westmeath	1–13
Longford	2–13
Meath	2–11
Kildare	1–08

Quarter-finals
Louth	2–08
Wexford	0–16
Longford	0–09
Laois	0–14
Meath	0–12
Dublin	0–16
Carlow	3–07
Offaly	2–19

Semi-finals
Wexford	0–13
Laois	1–13
Dublin	1–12
Offaly	0–10

Final
Laois	1–14
Dublin	3–14

==== Round 1 ====
13 May 2007
1st round

Longford	2–13 – 1–13	Westmeath
B Kavanagh (2-06, 4f), P Barden (0-02, 1f), B McElvaney, L Keenan, T Smullen, D Hanniffy, P Davis (0-01 each)	Report	D Dolan (0-05, 2f), M Flanagan (1-01), D Glennon (0-04), F Wilson (1f), D O Shaughnessy (0-01 each)

Pearse Park, Longford

20 May 2007
1st round

Louth	1–11 – 0–14	Wicklow
D Clarke (0–5, 3f), R Carroll (1–0), A Hoey (0–3, 2f), P Keenan (0–2), M Stanfield (0–1)	Report	T Gill (0–5, 3f), L Glynn (0–3), T Hannon (0–3, 1 ‘45’), P Earls (0–2)

Croke Park, Dublin

27 May 2007
1st round Replay

Louth	1–09 – 0–12 AET	Wicklow
N McDonnell 1–0, A Hoey 0–2 (2f), P Keenan, R Carroll, M Stanfield, S Lennon, M Farrelly, D Reid, JP Rooney (f) 0–1 each	Report	T Hannon 0–5 (3f), J Stafford 0–2, L Glynn, T Walsh, J Slattery, JP Dalton, D Odlum 0–1 each. T Gill S.O.

Parnell Park, Dublin

3 June 2007
1st round 2nd Replay

Louth	2–18 – 0–11	Wicklow
M Stanfield (1–3), JP Rooney (1–2. 1f), A Hoey (0–4, 1f), P Keenan (0–3), S Lennon (0–2), N McDonnell, C Grimes (0–1 each)	Report	T Hannon (0-3f), P Earls (0–2), P Dalton, T Walsh, L Glynn, J Slattery, T Gill, J McGrath (0–1 each)

Croke Park, Dublin

20 May 2007
1st round

Meath	2–11 – 1–08	Kildare
J Sheridan (1–2), S Bray (0–4), D Fay (1–0), P Byrne (0–3), K Reilly, P Curren (0–1 each). B Farrel SO	Report	E Bolton (1–1), J Doyle (0–4, 1f), K O'Neill, A Rainbow, T Fennin (0–1 each)

Croke Park, Dublin

==== Quarter-finals ====
2 June 2007
Quarter-final

Longford	0–09 – 0–14	Laois
B Kavanagh 0-05 (5f), P Barden, P Dowd, D Barden, K Mulligan 0-01 each	Report	M Tierney 0-04 (2f), P Clancy, B McDonald (2f) (0-02 each), P McMahon, B McCormack, N Garvan, R Munnelly, C Conway, P Lawlor (0-01 each)

O'Connor Park, Tullamore

3 June 2007
Quarter-final

Meath	0–14 – 1–11	Dublin
C Ward (0–5), S Bray, J Sheridan (0–3 each), C King, P Curran, G Geraghty (0–1 each)	Report	C Keaney (0–5), A Brogan (1–1), T Quinn (0–3), C Moran, S Ryan (0–1 each)

Croke Park, Dublin

10 June 2007
Quarter-final

Carlow	3–07 – 2–19	Offaly
J Hickey, D Hayden (1-00 each), B Kelly (0-02 1f), M Carpenter, P Reid, D Byrne, JJ Smith, N Conway (0-01 each); A McNamee scored own goal	Report	PJ Ward (0-08 2f), N McNamee (0-06 3f), K Slattery, N Coughlan (1-01 each), A McNamee, P Kellaghan, C McManus, (0-01 each)

O'Moore Park, Portlaoise
Attendance: 12000
Referee: Michael Daly

17 June 2007
Quarter-final Replay

Meath	0–12 – 0–16	Dublin
S Bray 0–4, B Farrell (0-1f) 0–3, G Geraghty 0–2, C Ward (f), A Moyles, N Crawford 0–1 each.	Report	M Vaughan 0–8 (0-4f, 1x sline, 1x'45'), C Keaney 0–4 (0-3f), C Moran, C Whelan, D Henry, A Brogan 0–1 each.

Croke Park, Dublin

17 June 2007
Quarter-final

Louth	2–08 – 0–16	Wexford
JP Rooney 1–1 (1f), J O’Brien 1–0, D Clarke 0–3 (2f), P Keenan 0–2, M Stanfield, S Lennon (0–1 each)	Report	M Forde 0-07 (3fs, 1x45), A Flynn 0–3, E Bradley, C Lyng (0–2 each), C Deely, R Barry (0–1 each)

Croke Park, Dublin

==== Semi-finals ====
24 June 2007
Semi-final

Dublin	1–12 – 0–10	Offaly
C. Keaney (1f), M. Vaughan (1f, 1x'45') (0-03 each), A. Brogan (0-02), T. Quinn, C. Whelan, J. Sherlock, C. Moran (0-01 each); M Quinn scored own goal	Report	N McNamee 0–7 (0-4f), P McConway, N Smith, S Ryan 0–1 each.

Croke Park, Dublin
Attendance: 77623
Referee: Michael Collins (Cork)

1 July 2007
Semi-final

Wexford	0–13 – 1–13	Laois
C Lyng (0–7, 3f), M Forde (0–4, 3f), A Morrissey, R Barry (0–1 each)	Report	MJ Tierney (0–7, 5f), P Lawlor (1–0), C Parkinson (0–2), P Clancy, B Quigley, C Conway, P O'Leary (0–1 each)

Croke Park, Dublin

==== Final ====
15 July 2007
Final

Dublin	3–14 – 1–14	Laois
M. Vaughan (1–6, 5f), A. Brogan (1-01), Bernard Brogan (junior) (1-01), C. Whelan (0-02), C. Keaney (0-02, 1f), T. Quinn, G. Brennan (0-01 each)	Report	MJ Tierney (0–7, 6f, 1 x45), R Munnelly (1–1), C Parkinson (0–3), P McCormack, P O'Leary, B Sheehan (0–1 each)

Croke Park, Dublin
Attendance: 81,394
Referee: Michael Hughes (Tyrone)

Top scorer: M Vaughan (Dublin) 1–17

=== Ulster Senior Football Championship ===
Preliminary round
Cavan	0–11
Down	0–15

Quarter-finals
Armagh	1–08
Donegal	1–09
Fermanagh	1–09
Tyrone	1–13
Down	1–15
Monaghan	2–15
Antrim	0–10
Derry	1–13

Semi-finals
Donegal	1–07
Tyrone	2–15
Monaghan	0–14
Derry	1–09

Final
Tyrone	1–15
Monaghan	1–13

==== Round 1 ====
13 May 2007
Preliminary round

Cavan	2–11 – 3–08	Down
Larry Reilly 1–2, J Crowe 1–0, G Pierson 0–3 (1f)Dermot McCabe and Jason O'Reilly 0–2 (2f) each, Seanie Johnston and S Brady 0–1 each	Report	Ronan Sexton 2–0, Brendan Coulter 1–1, Ronan Murtagh and Martin Cole 0–2 each, Dan Gordan, James McGovern and Paul McComiskey 0–1 each

Breffni Park, Cavan

20 May 2007
Preliminary round Replay

Cavan	0–11 – 0–15	Down
D McCabe 0–5, S Johnstone 0–3, A Ford, L Reilly, S Brady 0–1 each	Report	Danny Hughes 0–3, Paul Murphy, J McGovern, Paul McComiskey 0–2 each, Declan Rooney, Kevin McGuigan, R Murtagh, D Gordan, Stephen Kearney 0–1 each

Páirc Esler, Newry

==== Quarter-finals ====
20 May 2007
Quarter-final

Fermanagh	1–09 – 0–13	Tyrone
C O'Reilly 0–5 (4f, 1x'45'), M Murphy 1–1, T Brewster 0–2 (2f), M Little 0–1	Report	N Gormley 0–4 (1f), T McGuigan 0–3, G Cavlan 0–2 (2f), K Hughes, S Cavanagh, D Harte, R Mellon 0–1 each

St. Tiernach's Park, Clones

27 May 2007
Quarter-final

Donegal	1–09 – 1–08	Armagh
C McFadden 0–6 (6f), B Devenney 1–0, P McConagley, C Toye, A Sweeney 0–1 each	Report	O McConville 1–2 (2f), S McDonnell 0–2, A Kernan, K McGeeney, S Kernan, D Marsden 0–1 each

MacCumhaill Park, Ballybofey

10 June 2007
Quarter-final

Antrim	0–10 – 1–13	Derry
CJ McGourty, P Cunningham (4f) (0-04 each), M McCann (1f), K Niblock (0-01 each)		C Gilligan (0-05, 3f), M Lynch (1-01), E. Muldoon (0-04), J Conway, B McGoldrick, J Diver (0-01 each)

Casement Park, Belfast

10 June 2007
Quarter-final

Down	1–15 – 2–15	Monaghan
McGovern (3f), A Carr (3f, 1x'45') (0-04 each), P Downey (1-00), P Murphy, M Walsh (0-02 each), D Gordon, P McComiskey, S Kearney (0-01 each)	Report	C Hanratty (2-01), P Finlay (1f), T Freeman (3f) (0-05 each), S Gollogly (0-02), S Smith, C McManus (0-01 each)

Páirc Esler, Newry

==== Semi-finals ====
17 June 2007
Semi-final

Tyrone	2–15 – 1–07	Donegal
B Dooher 0-05, C McCullagh (1p, 1f), R Mulgrew (1-01 each), O Mulligan 0-03 (2f), S O'Neill 0-02, D Harte, K Hughes, S Cavanagh (0-01 each)	Report	K Cassidy (1–0), C Bonner, B Devenny (1f) (0-02 each), R Kavanagh, C McFadden, K McMenamin (0-01 each) C McFadden, K McMenamin SO

St. Tiernach's Park, Clones

24 June 2007
Semi-final

Monaghan	0–14 – 1–09	Derry
T Freeman (0–7), S Gollogly (0–4), R Woods (0–3).	Report	Paddy Bradley (1–2), C Gilligan (0–3), J Conway (0–2), J Diver, M Lynch (0–1 each).

Casement Park, Belfast

==== Final ====
15 July 2007
Final

Monaghan	1–13 – 1–15	Tyrone
T Freeman (1–3 1f), P Finlay (0–5 4f), V Corey, D Clerkin, S Gollogly, C Hanratty, R Woods (0–1 each)	Report	C McCullagh (0–5 4f), S Cavanagh (0–4), E Mulligan (0–3 3f), P Jordan (1–0), D Carlin, D Harte, G Cavlan (0–1 each)

St. Tiernach's Park, Clones

Top scorer: T Freeman (Monaghan) 1–15

=== Connacht Senior Football Championship ===
Quarter-finals
New York	1–03
Sligo	2–18
Mayo	0–09
Galway	2–10
London	2–05
Leitrim	1–12

Semi-finals
Sligo	0–13
Roscommon	2–05
Galway	0–17
Leitrim	1–10

Final
Sligo	1–10
Galway	0–12

==== Quarter-finals ====
13 May 2007
Quarter-final

New York	1–03 – 2–18	Sligo
R Garvey (1-01), S Russell, V Gavin (0-01 each)	Report	M Breheny (0-07), E O'Hara, K Quinn (1-00 each), A Marren (0-03), J McPartland, D Kelly, P Gallagher (0-02 each), S Davey, P Doohan (0-01 each)

Gaelic Park, New York City

20 May 2007
Quarter-final

Galway	2–10 – 0–09	Mayo
C Bane (2-01), N Joyce (0-03, 1f); P Joyce (1f), D Savage (0-02 each), M Meehan (1f), N Coleman (0-01 each); N Coleman S.O.	Report	C Mortimer (0-06, 6f), A Dillon (0-02, 1f), A Moran (0-01); P Harte S.O.

Pearse Stadium, Galway
Attendance: 24,387

27 May 2007
Quarter-final

London	2–05 – 1–12	Leitrim
C Donnellan, N Clinton (0-1f) 1–1 each, D Kinneavey 0-2f, P Hehir 0–1. P Hehir & C Beirne S.O.	Report	C Duignan 0–7 (0-4f), D Brennan 1–0, J Glancy, M Foley (f) 0–2 each, C Regan 0–1.

Ruislip, London

==== Semi-finals ====
17 June 2007
Semi-final

Sligo	0–13 – 2–05	Roscommon
M Breheny 0-04 (3f), B Curran 0-03, S Davey 0-02, J Davey (1x'45'), K Quinn, J McPartland, K Sweeney (0-01 each)	Report	K Mannion 1-01, C Cregg 1-00, G Heneghan 0-03 (3f), G Cox 0-01

Dr. Hyde Park, Roscommon

24 June 2007
Semi-final

Galway	0–17 – 1–10	Leitrim
N Joyce (0-06 2f), P Joyce (0-03 2f), J Fallon, S Armstrong (0-02 each), J Bergin, D Savage, C Bane (0-01 each)	Report	G McCloskey (1-00), C Duignan (0-03 1f), D Brennan, D Maxwell (0-02 each), M Foley, J Glancy (0-01 each)

Páirc Sheáin Mhic Dhiarmada, Carrick-on-Shannon

==== Final ====
8 July 2007
Final

Sligo	1–10 – 0–12	Galway
M Breheny 0–4 (3f), E O'Hara (1–0), J McPartland (0–2), M McNamara, J Davey ('45'), K Quinn, K Sweeney (0–1 each)	Report	P Joyce 0–5 (5f), N Joyce (1f), J Fallon (0–2 each), D Savage, M Meehan, C Bane (0–1 each)

Dr. Hyde Park, Roscommon
Referee: Brian Crowe (Cavan)

Top Scorer: M Breheny (Sligo) 0–15

=== All-Ireland qualifiers ===
The first round of the qualifying rounds / 'back door system' includes all the counties that did not qualify for their respective provincial final with the exceptions of Antrim, Carlow, Clare, London, Offaly, Tipperary, Waterford and Wicklow. These eight teams played in the Tommy Murphy Cup because these particular teams all played in Division 4 of the 2008 National Football League.

==== Round 1 ====
An open draw for the first round took place on 24 June, after all but one of the participants were known. This made sure that some teams did not have the advantage of knowing who they are going to be playing against longer than others. The matches were scheduled to be played on the weekend of 7 July and 8.

The eight winning teams from the first round went into another open draw for the second round leaving four teams who then went on to play the four losing teams from the respective provincial finals in the third and final round of qualifiers. The four winning teams from the third round were drawn against one of the four provincial winners in the All-Ireland quarter-finals.

The first round fixture that was most hotly anticipated is the all-Ulster clash of Derry and Armagh.

7 July 2007 Round 1	Limerick	0–13 – 0–14	Louth	Gaelic Grounds, Limerick
	M. Reidy 0–7 (5f), G. Collins 0–3, T. Carroll, M.Crowley, J. Galvin 0–1 each	Report	B. White (2f), M.Stanfield, S. Lennon, D. Clarke, A.Hoey (1f) (0–2 each), C. Judge, M.Farrelly, S. O'Neill, R. Carroll (0–1 each)

7 July 2007 Round 1	Leitrim	1–12 – 1–14; AET	Donegal	Páirc Sheáin Mhic Dhiarmada, Carrick-on-Shannon
	C Duignan (0–7, 4f), J Glancy (1–2), M Duignan (0–2, 1 45), D Reynolds, D Maxwell, F McBrien (0–1)	Report	M Murphy (1–1), K McMenamin (2f), B Devanney (0–3 each), M Hegarty, R Kavanagh, R Bradley (0–2 each), E McGee, C Toye, S McDermott (0–1 each)

7 July 2007 Round 1	Mayo	1–19 – 3–07	Cavan	McHale Park, Castlebar
	C Mortimer 0–7 (3f), A Dillon 0–5 (2f), B Moran 1–0, A Moran, P Hanley (0–2 each), D Heaney, T Mortimer, G Brady (0–1 each).	Report	D McCabe 1–4 (1p, 3f), J O'Reilly 1–0, R Gallagher 1–0, G Pearson, L Reilly, R Cullivan (0–1 each)

7 July 2007 Round 1	Down	0–08 – 1–10	Meath	Páirc Esler, Newry
	A Carr (0–7), B Coulter (0–1)	Report	P Byrne (1–1), S Bray (0–3), B Farrell (0–2), N McLoughlin (0–1)

7 July 2007 Round 1	Roscommon	1–13 – 2–13	Kildare	Dr. Hyde Park, Roscommon
	K Mannion (1-01), G Cox (0-04, 2f), G Heneghan (0-03), D Connellan (0-02), S O Neill, J Tiernan (0-01 each)	Report	J Doyle (1-08, 5f), P O Neill (1-02), E Bolton, K Donnelly, J Phillips, (0-01 each)

7 July 2007 Round 1	Westmeath	0–18 – 0–09	Longford	Cusack Park, Mullingar
	D Dolan (0–6 6f), F Wilson (3f), D Glennon (0–4 each), D O'Donoghue, J Smith, G Dolan, J Connellan (0–1 each); F Wilson SO	Report	B Kavanagh (0–6 6f), B McElvaney, P Barden, P Davis (0–1 each)

8 July 2007 Round 1	Fermanagh	1–12 – 1–08	Wexford	St. Tiernach's Park, Clones
	C O'Reilly 0–4 (4f), J Sherry (1–0), E Maguire, R Keenan, S Doherty (0–2 each), M Little, T Brewster (f) (0–1 each)	Report	R Barry (1–0), M Forde 0–3 (3f), C Lyng 0–2 (1f), A Morrissey, P Wallace, D Fogarty (0–1 each)

8 July 2007 Round 1	Armagh	0–09 – 0–10	Derry	St. Tiernach's Park, Clones
	S McDonnell 0–4 (1x'45'), S Kernan, O McConville (0–2 each), D Marsden (0–1)	Report	P Bradley 0–5 (4f), C Devlin (0–2), P Murphy, M Lynch, B McGoldrick (0–1 each)

==== Round 2 ====
The draw for the second qualifying round took place on 8 July, after the first round results had all been settled. The most anticipated pairing was that of Mayo and Derry. Derry won that game, having already upset Armagh the previous week.

14 July 2007 Round 2	Westmeath	1–08 – 1–13	Donegal	Cusack Park, Mullingar
	M Flanagan 1–0, D Dolan 0–3 (2f), D Glennon 0–2, F Wilson, M Ennis, A Mangan (0–1 each).	Report	B Devaney 1–2 (1f), K McMenamin (2f), R Kavanagh (0–3 each), M Murphy 0–2, N McGready, R Bradley, C Bonner (0–1 each). N McCready and C Bonner SO

14 July 2007 Round 2	Derry	2–13 – 1–06	Mayo	Celtic Park, Derry
	Paddy Bradley (0–5, 2f), E. Muldoon, C Devlin (1–1 each), C Gilligan (0–3, 2f), J Conway, B McGoldrick, R Wilkinson (0–1 each)	Report	B Moran (1–2), P Hanley, A Moran, A Kilcoyne (0–1 each), C Mortimer (0–1, 1f)

14 July 2007 Round 2	Kildare	1–10 – 1–16	Louth	St. Conleth's Park, Newbridge
	J Doyle 1–4 (1p, 1x45, 1f), E Callaghan, E Bolton, J Kavanagh, P O'Neill, M Foley, T Rossiter (0–1 each)	Report	P Keenan 1–1, A Hoey (3f), B White (3f) (0–4 each), C Judge 0–3, J O'Brien, R Carroll, M Stanfield, S Lennon (0–1 each)

14 July 2007 Round 2	Meath	0–11 – 0–09	Fermanagh	Páirc Tailteann, Navan
	B Farrell (0–6 3f), P Byrne (0–2), A Moyles, S Bray, S O'Rourke (0–1 each)	Report	C O'Reilly (0–4 3f), T Brewster (0–3 3f), S McDermott, M Murphy (0–1 each)

==== Round 3 ====
The draw for the third round took place on 14 July, and it included the runners up of the provincial championships, each of whom was drawn to play one of the four successful teams from the second round.

21 July 2007 Round 3	Cork	0–16 – 0–14	Louth	O'Moore Park, Portlaoise
	J Masters (0-05 3f), D O'Connor (3f), K McMahon (0-03 each), K O'Connor, N Murphy, D Kavanagh, C McCarthy, P O'Neill (0-01 each).	Report	A Hoey 0–4 (2f), S Lennon, C Judge, D Clarke (1f), B White (2f) (0–2 each), R Carroll, M Standfield (‘45’) (0–1 each)

21 July 2007 Round 3	Galway	1–14 -2-14	Meath	O'Moore Park, Portlaoise
	M Meehan 1–5 (1p, 2f), N Joyce 0–5 (1f), S Armstrong 0–3, M Clancy 0–1.	Report	S Bray 2–2, B Farrell 0- 6 (5f), S O'Rourke 0–2, C McCarthy, G Geraghty, M Ward, A Moyles (0–1 each).

28 July 2007 Round 3	Laois	2–11 – 1–18	Derry	Breffni Park, Cavan
	M Tierney (0–4, 3f), C Parkinson (0–3), P McMahon, B Sheehan (1–0 each), J Higgins, B McCormack, P Lawlor, R Munnelly (0–1 each)	Report	Paddy Bradley (0–7, 5f), P Murphy (1–2), C Gilligan (0–3, 2f), M Lynch (0–2), G O'Kane, F Doherty, J Conway, C Devlin (0–1 each)

28 July 2007 Round 3	Monaghan	2–12 – 1–07	Donegal	Healy Park, Omagh
	T Freeman 1–5 (2f), P Finlay 0–4 (2f), V Corey (1–1), C Hanratty, S Smith (0–1 each)	Report	R Kavanagh (1–2), E McGee, K McMenamin, K Cassidy, C McFadden, B Devenney (0–1, each).

=== All-Ireland series ===
This stage of the competition is a pure knockout, with teams competing facing off in a single match. As many replays as it takes determines who proceeds in the competition, as at the time there was no definitive tie-breaker in use in Gaelic Games.

The draw for the quarter-finals took place on Sunday 29 July, and it involved the four winning teams from Round Three of the qualifier series being drawn against the four provincial winners; Tyrone, Sligo, Kerry and Dublin.

Quarter-finals
Sligo	0–08
Cork	1–11
Tyrone	2–08
Meath	1–13
Dublin	0–18
Derry	0–15
Kerry	1–12
Monaghan	1–11

Semi-finals
Cork	1–16
Meath	0–09
Dublin	0–16
Kerry	1–15

Final
Cork	1–09
Kerry	3–13

==== Quarter-finals ====
4 August 2007
Quarter-final

Sligo	0–08 – 1–11	Cork
S Davey (0-02), M Breheny (0-03), E O'Hara, J McPartland, P Gallagher (0–1 each)	Report	J Masters (0-04), J Miskella (1–0), D O'Connor (0-03), K O'Sullivan, K McMahon, P O'Neill, C McCarthy (0-01 each)sm

Croke Park, Dublin

4 August 2007
Quarter-final

Tyrone	2–08 – 1–13	Meath
O Mulligan (1-01), S Cavanagh (1-00), R Mulgrew, C McCullagh (0-02 each), G Cavlan, D McCaul, R Mellon (0-01 each)	Report	G Geraghty (1-02), B Farrell (0-04), S Bray (0-03), P Byrne, S O'Rourke, N Crawford, M Ward (0-01 each)

Croke Park, Dublin

11 August 2007
Quarter-final

Dublin	0–18 – 0–15	Derry
M Vaughan (0–6, 0–3 f, 0–3 ‘45s), C Keaney, B Brogan, A Brogan (0–3), J Sherlock (0–2), C Moran (0–1).	Report	Paddy Bradley (0–6), C Gilligan (0–3), C Devlin, P Murphy (0–2), E Bradley, F Doherty (0–1)

Croke Park, Dublin

12 August 2007
Quarter-final

Kerry	1–12 – 1–11	Monaghan
MF Russell (0-04), C Cooper (0-03), Declan O’Sullivan (1-00), B Sheehan (0-02), E Brosnan, K Young (0-01 each).	Report	T Freeman (1–3), R Woods (0–3), C Hanratty, P Finlay (0–2 each), S Gollogly (0–1).

Croke Park, Dublin

==== Semi-finals ====
19 August 2007
Semi-final

Cork	1–16 0–09	Meath
D O’Connor (0-07), K McMahon (1-02), D Goulding (0–2), D Kavanagh, N Murphy, J Miskella, P O’Neill (0-01 each).		B Farrell (0-04), S Bray, S O’Rourke (0–2 each), C King (0–1)

Croke Park, Dublin

26 August 2007
Semi-final

Dublin	0–16 1–15	Kerry
B Cullen (0–2), B Cahill (0–1), A Brogan (0–3), B Brogan (0–1), C Keaney (0–4, 0-2f), M Vaughan (0–5, 0-4f)	Report	T O Se (0–1), D O'Sullivan (1–3), E Brosnan (0–2), P Galvin (0–2), C Cooper (0–3, 0-2f), B Sheehan (0–3, 0-1f), S O'Sullivan (0–1)

Croke Park, Dublin

==== Final ====
16 September 2007
Final

Cork	1–09 – 3–13	Kerry
D Goulding (1–01), Donncha O'Connor (0-04), James Masters (0-03), Michael Cussen (0–01)	Report	Colm Cooper (1-05), Kieran Donaghy (2-00), Bryan Sheehan (0-02), Tomás Ó Sé, Aidan O'Mahony, Seamus Scanlon, Paul Galvin, Declan O'Sullivan, S O'Sullivan (0-01 each)

Croke Park, Dublin
Attendance: 82,196
Referee: David Coldrick (Meath)

== Championship statistics ==
=== Miscellaneous ===
- Waterford win their first Munster championship game since 1988.
- Sligo won their first Connacht title since 1975.
- Monaghan reach the Ulster final for the first time since 1988.

=== Top scorers ===
Position	Player	Tally	Total	Matches	Average
1	James Masters (Cork)	3–30	39 points	6	6.5
2	Tomás Freeman (Monaghan)	3–23	32	5	6.4
3	Mark Vaughan (Dublin)	1–28	31	5	5.2
4	Paddy Bradley (Derry)	1–25	28	5	5.6
=	Donncha O'Connor (Cork)	1–25	28	6	4.7
6	Stephen Bray (Meath)	2–21	27	6	3.8
7	Brian Farrell (Meath)	0–26	26	6	2.8
8	Colm Cooper (Kerry)	2–18	24	5	4.8
9	Brian Kavanagh (Longford)	2–17	23	3	7.6
10	John Doyle (Kildare)	2–16	22	3	7.3
=	Michael Tierney (Laois)	0–22	22	4	5.5

=== Individual feats ===
Player	County	Tally	Opposition
James Masters	Cork	2-07 (13)	Tipperary
Brian Kavanagh	Longford	2-06 (12)	Westmeath
John Doyle	Kildare	1-08 (11)	Roscommon
James Masters	Cork	1-07 (10)	Limerick
Nicky Joyce	Galway	0-09 (9)	Leitrim
Mark Vaughan	Dublin	1-06 (9)	Laois
Eoin Brosnan	Kerry	2-02 (8)	Waterford
PJ Ward	Offaly	0-08 (8)	Carlow
Tomás Freeman	Monaghan	1-05 (8)	Donegal
