= Michael Tierney (Gaelic footballer) =

Irish Gaelic footballer

Michael John Tierney
Personal information
- Native name: Micheál Seán Ó Tiarnaigh (Irish)
- Nickname: MJ
- Born: 1986 (age 39–40) County Laois, Ireland
- Height: 5'11

Sport
- Sport: Gaelic Football
- Position: Corner forward
Clubs
- Years: Club
- 2011–: Ballyroan Abbey; Parnells
Club titles
- Laois titles: 1
Inter-county
- Years: County
- 2004–: Laois
Inter-county titles
- Leinster titles: 3
- All-Irelands: 1

Michael John (MJ) Tierney is a Gaelic football player from Laois in Ireland.

He usually plays in attack for Laois and in 2003 was part of the Laois team that won the All-Ireland Minor Football Championship title for the first time since 1997.

In the same year he played at full forward for his school team St. Marys C.B.S Portlaoise who won the South Leinster and Leinster schools titles and went on to be defeated in the All Ireland Final by St Louis, Kilkeel, County Down.

He was crowned junior footballer of the year and sportsman of the year in his time at C.B.S Portlaoise.

In 2004, he was part of the minor team which won the Leinster Minor Football Championship.

In 2006 and 2007, Michael was part of the Laois team that won the Leinster U21 Football Championship.

At club level, Michael usually lines out as a forward with Ballyroan Abbey and in 2006 he was named as Laois Senior Footballer of the Year after inspiring the Ballyroan/Abbeyleix combination, Ballyroan Gaels to the Laois Senior Football Championship title. He has also played for Hong Kong, starring in their 2008 Asian finals victory over Singapore where he received the finals MVP award. He then returned to play with his club in the Laois Intermediate Football Championship final in October.

In 2010 he joined follow Laois teammates Colm Begley, Colm Parkinson and Darren Rooney at Dublin side Parnells but in early 2013 he made the return trip to rejoin his home club, Ballyroan Abbey.
