= 1942 Dublin Senior Hurling Championship =

Annual hurling competition season

- Champions: Young Irelands (3rd title)
- Runners-up: Eoghan Ruadh

The 1942 Dublin Senior Hurling Championship was the 55th staging of the Dublin Senior Hurling Championship since its establishment by the Dublin County Board in 1887.

Faughs entered the championship as the defending champions.

The final was played on 14 June 1942 at Croke Park in Dublin, between Young Irelands and Eoghan Ruadh, in what was their first ever meeting in the final. Young Irelands won the match by 4–06 to 2–07 to claim their third championship title overall and a first title in five years.

== Results ==
=== Final ===
14 June 1942 Final	Young Irelands	4-06 - 2-07	Eoghan Ruadh	Croke Park
