= 1914 Dublin Senior Hurling Championship =

Annual hurling competition season

- Champions: Faughs (9th title)
- Runners-up: Collegians

The 1914 Dublin Senior Hurling Championship was the 27th staging of the Dublin Senior Hurling Championship since its establishment by the Dublin County Board in 1887.

Thomas Davis entered the championship as the defending champions.

The final was played on 4 May 1914 at Croke Park in Dublin, between Faughs and Collegians, in what was their first ever meeting in the final. Faughs won the match by 11–03 to 3–01 to claim their ninth championship title overall and a first title in three years.

== Results ==
=== Final ===
| 4 May 1914 Final | Faughs | 11-03 - 3-01 | Collegians | Croke Park |
