= 1999 Dublin Senior Hurling Championship =

Annual hurling competition season

- Champions: Faughs (31st title); Tim Murnane (captain)
- Runners-up: St Vincent's; Philip Harney (captain)

The 1999 Dublin Senior Hurling Championship was the 112th staging of the Dublin Senior Hurling Championship since its establishment by the Dublin County Board in 1887.

Craobh Chiaráin entered the championship as the defending champions.

The final was played on 18 September 1999 at Parnell Park in Donnycarney, between Faughs and St Vincent's, in what was their first meeting in the final in 29 years. Faughs won the match by 1–11 to 2–05 to claim their 31st championship title overall and a first title in seven years. It remains their last championship title.

== Results ==
=== Final ===
18 September 1999 Final	Faughs	1-11 - 2-05	St Vincent's	Parnell Park
