= 1995 Dublin Senior Hurling Championship =

Annual hurling competition season

- Champions: O'Tooles (5th title)
- Runners-up: St Vincent's

The 1995 Dublin Senior Hurling Championship was the 108th staging of the Dublin Senior Hurling Championship since its establishment by the Dublin County Board in 1887.

Cuala entered the championship as the defending champions.

The final was played on 1 October 1995 at Lawless Park in Swords, between O'Tooles and St Vincent's, in what was their fourth meeting in the final overall. O'Tooles won the match by 2–08 to 0–10 to claim their fifth championship title overall and a first title in five years.

== Results ==
=== Final ===
1 October 1995 Final	O'Tooles	2-08 - 0-10	St Vincent's	Lawless Park
