= 1931 Dublin Senior Hurling Championship =

Annual hurling competition season

- Champions: Garda (6th title)
- Runners-up: Faughs

The 1931 Dublin Senior Hurling Championship was the 44th staging of the Dublin Senior Hurling Championship since its establishment by the Dublin County Board in 1887.

Faughs entered the championship as the defending champions.

The final was played on 17 May 1931 at Croke Park in Dublin, between Garda and Faughs, in what was their fifth meeting in the final overall. Garda won the match by 5–04 to 3–02 to claim their sixth championship title overall and a first title in two years. It remains their last championship title.

== Results ==
=== Final ===
17 May 1931 Final	Garda	5-04 - 3-02	Faughs	Croke Park
