= 2004 Dublin Senior Hurling Championship =

Annual hurling competition season

- Sponsor: Evening Herald
- Champions: University College Dublin (7th title); Michael Fitzgerald (captain); Michael Keating (manager)
- Runners-up: Ballyboden St Enda's

The 2004 Dublin Senior Hurling Championship was the 117th staging of the Dublin Senior Hurling Championship since its establishment by the Dublin County Board in 1887.

Craobh Chiaráin entered the championship as the defending champions.

The final was played on 3 October 2004 at Parnell Park in Donnycarney, between University College Dublin and Ballyboden St Enda's, in what was their first ever meeting in the final. University College Dublin won the match by 1–13 to 0–09 to claim their seventh championship title overall and a first title in four years.

== Results ==
=== Final ===
3 October 2004 Final	University College Dublin	1-13 - 0-09	Ballyboden St Enda's	Parnell Park
	B Barry 1-5, T Murphy 0-3, B Barr 0-3 (all frees), B Phelan, B Murphy 0-1 each.	Report	D Curtin 0-5 (4f, one 65) C Keaney 0-2, D Daly, T Sweeney 0-1 each.
