= 1992 Dublin Senior Hurling Championship =

Annual hurling competition season

- Champions: Faughs (30th title)
- Runners-up: Craobh Chiaráin

The 1992 Dublin Senior Hurling Championship was the 105th staging of the Dublin Senior Hurling Championship since its establishment by the Dublin County Board in 1887.

Cuala entered the championship as the defending champions.

The final was played on 27 September 1992 at Parnell Park in Donnycarney, between Faughs and Craobh Chiaráin, in what was their first ever meeting in the final. Faughs won the match by 2–13 to 1–06 to claim their 30th championship title overall and a first title in five years.

== Results ==
=== Final ===
27 September 1992 Final	Faughs	2-13 - 1-06	Craobh Chiaráin	Parnell Park
