= 1912 Dublin Senior Hurling Championship =

Annual hurling competition season

- Champions: Rapparees (3rd title)
- Runners-up: Davis

The 1912 Dublin Senior Hurling Championship was the 25th staging of the Dublin Senior Hurling Championship since its establishment by the Dublin County Board in 1887.

Faughs entered the championship as the defending champions.

The final was played on 2 June 1912 at Jones's Road in Dublin, between Rapparees and Davis, in what was their first ever meeting in the final. Rapparees won the match by 4–00 to 2–01 to claim their third championship title overall and a first title in 18 years.

== Results ==
=== Final ===
2 June 1912 Final	Rapparees	4-00 - 2-01	Davis	Jones's Road
