= 2003 Dublin Senior Hurling Championship =

Annual hurling competition season

- Sponsor: Evening Herald
- Champions: Craobh Chiaráin (4th title)
- Runners-up: St Brigid's

The 2003 Dublin Senior Hurling Championship was the 116th staging of the Dublin Senior Hurling Championship since its establishment by the Dublin County Board in 1887.

O'Tooles entered the championship as the defending champions.

The final was played on 11 October 2003 at Parnell Park in Donnycarney, between Craobh Chiaráin and St Brigid's, in what was their first ever meeting in the final. Craobh Chiaráin won the match by 3–15 to 3–06 to claim their fourth championship title overall and a first title in two years.

== Results ==
=== Final ===
11 October 2003 Final	Craobh Chiaráin	3-15 - 3-06	St Brigid's	Parnell Park
		Report
