= 1910 Dublin Senior Hurling Championship =

Annual hurling competition season

- Champions: Faughs (7th title)
- Runners-up: Kickhams

The 1910 Dublin Senior Hurling Championship was the 23rd staging of the Dublin Senior Hurling Championship since its establishment by the Dublin County Board in 1887.

Commercials entered the championship as the defending champions.

The final was played on 5 June 1910 at Jones's Road in Dublin, between Faughs and Kickhams, in what was their second meeting in the final overall. Faughs won the match by 2–13 to 1–09 to claim their seventh championship title overall and a first title in four years.

== Results ==
=== Final ===
5 June 1910 Final	Faughs	2-13 - 1-09	Kickhams	Jones's Road
