= 1965 Dublin Senior Hurling Championship =

Annual hurling competition season

- Champions: Young Irelands (6th title)
- Runners-up: University Colleeg Dublin

The 1965 Dublin Senior Hurling Championship was the 76th staging of the Dublin Senior Hurling Championship since its establishment by the Dublin County Board in 1887.

St Vincent's entered the championship as the defending champions.

The final was played on 20 June 1965 at Croke Park in Dublin, between Young Irelands and University College Dublin, in what was their fifth meeting in the final overall. Young Irelands won the match by 2–11 to 3–05 to claim their sixth championship title overall and a first title in 16 years.

== Results ==
=== Final ===
20 June 1965 Final	Young Irelands	2-11 - 3-05	University College Dublin	Croke Park
