= 1993 Dublin Senior Hurling Championship =

Annual hurling competition season

- Champions: St Vincent's (13th title)
- Runners-up: Crumlin

The 1993 Dublin Senior Hurling Championship was the 106th staging of the Dublin Senior Hurling Championship since its establishment by the Dublin County Board in 1887.

Faughs entered the championship as the defending champions.

The final was played on 24 July 1993 at Parnell Park in Donnycarney, between St Vincent's and Crumlin, in what was their first ever meeting in the final. St Vincent's won the match by 3–10 to 2–11 to claim their 13th championship title overall and a first title in five years. It remains their last championship title.

== Results ==
=== Final ===
24 July 1993 Final	St Vincent's	3-10 - 2-11	Crumlin	Parnell Park
