= 1903 Dublin Senior Hurling Championship =

Annual hurling competition season

- Champions: Faughs (4th title)
- Runners-up: Grocers

The 1903 Dublin Senior Hurling Championship was the 16th staging of the Dublin Senior Hurling Championship since its establishment by the Dublin County Board in 1887.

Faughs entered the championship as the defending champions.

The final was played on 28 February 1904 at Jones's Road in Dublin, between Faughs and Grocers, in what was their first meeting in the final in three years. Faughs won the match by 1–07 to 0–01 to claim their fourth championship title overall and a third consecutive title.

== Results ==
=== Final ===
28 February 1904 Final	Faughs	1-07 - 0-01	Grocers	Jones's Road
