= 1994 Dublin Senior Hurling Championship =

Annual hurling competition season

- Champions: Cuala (3rd title)
- Runners-up: Crumlin

The 1994 Dublin Senior Hurling Championship was the 107th staging of the Dublin Senior Hurling Championship since its establishment by the Dublin County Board in 1887.

St Vincent's entered the championship as the defending champions.

The final was played on 12 November 1994 at Parnell Park in Donnycarney, between Cuala and Crumlin, in what was their first ever meeting in the final. Cuala won the match by 1–16 to 0–16 to claim their third championship title overall and a first title in three years.

== Results ==
=== Final ===
12 November 1994 Final	Cuala	1-16 - 0-16	Crumlin	Parnell Park
