= 2020 Dublin Senior Hurling Championship =

Annual hurling competition season

- Sponsor: Evening Herald
- Champions: Cuala (8th title); Darragh O'Connell (captain); William Maher (manager)
- Runners-up: Ballyboden St Enda's

The 2020 Dublin Senior Hurling Championship was the 133rd staging of the Dublin Senior Hurling Championship since its establishment by the Dublin County Board in 1887.

Cuala entered the championship as the defending champions.

The final was played on 20 September 2020 at Parnell Park in Donnycarney, between Cuala and Ballyboden St Enda's, in what was their first ever meeting in the final. Cuala won the match by 2–20 to 1–18 to claim their eighth championship title overall and a second consecutive title.

== Results ==
=== Final ===
20 September 2020 Final	Cuala	2-20 - 1-18	Ballyboden St Enda's	Parnell Park
	D Treacy 0-11 (7f, 1 ’65); S Moran 2-3 (1-0 pen, 1f); J Malone, N Carty, Con O’Callaghan, C Cronin, M Schutte, N Kenny 0-1 each.	Report	P Ryan 0-8 (3f, 1 ’65); N Ryan 0-4; C Keaney 1-1; A Mellett, C Dooley 0-2 each; P Doherty 0-1.
