= 2002 Dublin Senior Hurling Championship =

Annual hurling competition season

- Sponsor: Evening Herald
- Champions: O'Tooles (8th title)
- Runners-up: Craobh Chiaráin

The 2002 Dublin Senior Hurling Championship was the 115th staging of the Dublin Senior Hurling Championship since its establishment by the Dublin County Board in 1887.

Craobh Chiaráin entered the championship as the defending champions.

The final, a replay, was played on 27 October 2002 at Parnell Park in Donnycarney, between O'Tooles and Craobh Chiaráin, in what was their first ever meeting in the final. O'Tooles won the match by 1–13 to 2–07 to claim their eighth championship title overall and a first title in five years.

== Results ==
=== Final ===
13 October 2002 Final	O'Tooles	3-09 - 0-18	Craobh Chiaráin	Parnell Park

=== Final replay ===
27 October 2002 Final replay	O'Tooles	1-13 - 2-07	Craobh Chiaráin	Parnell Park
