= 1924 Dublin Senior Hurling Championship =

Annual hurling competition season

- Dates: 9 March – 20 April 1924
- Teams: 7
- Champions: Kickhams (4th title)
- Runners-up: Young Irelands

Tournament statistics
- Matches played: 6
- Goals scored: 38 (6.33 per match)
- Points scored: 30 (5 per match)

The 1924 Dublin Senior Hurling Championship was the 37th staging of the Dublin Senior Hurling Championship since its establishment by the Dublin County Board in 1887. The draw for the opening round fixtures took place on 11 February 1924. The championship ran from 9 March to 20 April 1924.

Faughs entered the championship as the defending champions and in search of a record-equalling fifth consecutive title, however, they were beaten by Young Irelands in the first round.

The final was played on 20 April 1924 at Croke Park in Dublin, between Kickhams and Young Irelands, in what was their first ever meeting in the final. Kickhams won the match by 6–07 to 5–02 to claim their fourth championship title overall and a first title in 16 years.

== Results ==
=== First round ===
9 March 1924 First round	Young Irelands	4-02 - 3-02	Faughs	Croke Park

16 March 1924 First round	Col Colberts	1-04 - 0-01	University College Dublin	Croke Park

30 March 1924 First round	Civic Guards	10-01 - 1-01	O'Tooles	Croke Park

- Kickhams received a bye in this round.

=== Semi-finals ===
30 March 1924 Semi-final	Young Irelands	3-01 - 2-03	Con Colberts	Croke Park

6 April 1924 Semi-final	Kickhams	2-03 - 1-03	Civic Guards	Croke Park

=== Final ===
20 April 1924 Final	Kickhams	6-07 - 5-02	Young Irelands	Croke Park
