= 1939 Dublin Senior Hurling Championship =

Annual hurling competition season

- Champions: Faughs (17th title)
- Runners-up: Eoghan Ruadh

The 1939 Dublin Senior Hurling Championship was the 52nd staging of the Dublin Senior Hurling Championship since its establishment by the Dublin County Board in 1887.

Army Metro entered the championship as the defending champions.

The final was played on 25 June 1939 at Croke Park in Dublin, between Faughs and Eoghan Ruadh, in what was their first ever meeting in the final. Faughs won the match by 3–10 to 3–01 to claim their 17th championship title overall and a first title in three years.

== Results ==
=== Final ===
25 June 1939 Final	Faughs	3-10 - 3-01	Eoghan Ruadh	Croke Park
