= 1909 Dublin Senior Hurling Championship =

Annual hurling competition season

- Champions: Commercials (8th title)
- Runners-up: Davis

The 1909 Dublin Senior Hurling Championship was the 22nd staging of the Dublin Senior Hurling Championship since its establishment by the Dublin County Board in 1887.

Kickhams entered the championship as the defending champions.

The final was played on 6 June 1909 at Jones' Road in Dublin, between Commercials and Davis, in what was their first ever meeting in the final. Commercials won the match by 2–11 to 1–08 to claim their eighth championship title overall and a first title in two years.

== Results ==
=== Final ===
6 June 1909 Final	Commercials	2-11 - 1-08	Kickhams	Jones' Road
