= 1981 Dublin Senior Hurling Championship =

Annual hurling competition season

- Champions: St Vincent's (10th title)
- Runners-up: O'Tooles

The 1981 Dublin Senior Hurling Championship was the 94th staging of the Dublin Senior Hurling Championship since its establishment by the Dublin County Board in 1887.

St Brendan's entered the championship as the defending champions.

The final, a replay, was played on 27 September 1981 at Croke Park in Dublin, between St Vincent's and O'Tooles, in what was their first ever meeting in the final. St Vincent's won the match by 5–10 to 3–10 to claim their 10th championship title overall and a first title in six years.

== Results ==
=== Final ===
26 August 1981 Final	St Vincent's	2-07 - 1-10	O'Tooles	Croke Park

=== Final replay ===
27 September 1981 Final	St Vincent's	5-10 - 3-10 (aet)	O'Tooles	Croke Park
