= 1938 Dublin Senior Hurling Championship =

Annual hurling competition season

- Champions: Army Metro (3rd title)
- Runners-up: Young Irelands

The 1938 Dublin Senior Hurling Championship was the 51st staging of the Dublin Senior Hurling Championship since its establishment by the Dublin County Board in 1887.

Young Irelands entered the championship as the defending champions.

The final was played on 26 June 1938 at Croke Park in Dublin, between Army Metro and Young Irelands, in what was their first ever meeting in the final. Army Metro won the match by 4–08 to 5–04 to claim their third championship title overall and a first title in three years.

== Results ==
=== Final ===
26 June 1938 Final	Army Metro	4-08 - 5-04	Young Irelands	Croke Park
