= 1952 Dublin Senior Hurling Championship =

Annual hurling competition season

- Champions: Faughs (24th title)
- Runners-up: St Vincent's

The 1952 Dublin Senior Hurling Championship was the 65th staging of the Dublin Senior Hurling Championship since its establishment by the Dublin County Board in 1887.

Eoghan Ruadhs entered the championship as the defending champions.

The final was played on 6 June 1952 at Croke Park in Dublin, between Faughs and St Vincent's, in what was their first ever meeting in the final. Faughs won the match by 2–10 to 4–01 to claim their 24th championship title overall and a first title in two years.

== Results ==
=== Final ===
6 June 1952 Final	Faughs	2-10 - 4-01	St Vincent's	Croke Park
