= 1926 Dublin Senior Hurling Championship =

Annual hurling competition season

- Champions: Garda (2nd title)
- Runners-up: Kevin's

The 1926 Dublin Senior Hurling Championship was the 39th staging of the Dublin Senior Hurling Championship since its establishment by the Dublin County Board in 1887.

Garda entered the championship as the defending champions.

The final was played on 25 April 1926 at Croke Park in Dublin, between Garda and Kevin's, in what was their first ever meeting in the final. Garda won the match by 7–14 to 1–03 to claim their second consecutive championship title.

== Results ==
=== Final ===
25 April 1926 Final	Garda	7-14 - 1-03	Kevin's	Croke Park
