= 2005 Dublin Senior Hurling Championship =

Annual hurling competition season

- Sponsor: Evening Herald
- Champions: University College Dublin (8th title); Michael Fitzgerald (captain); Michael Keating (manager)
- Runners-up: St Vincent's

The 2005 Dublin Senior Hurling Championship was the 118th staging of the Dublin Senior Hurling Championship since its establishment by the Dublin County Board in 1887.

University College Dublin entered the championship as the defending champions.

The final was played on 28 October 2005 at Parnell Park in Donnycarney, between University College Dublin and St Vincent's, in what was their third meeting in the final overall. University College Dublin won the match by 3–13 to 2–10 to claim their eighth championship title overall and a second consecutive title.

== Results ==
=== Final ===
28 October 2005 Final	University College Dublin	3-13 - 2-10	St Vincent's	Parnell Park
	P Morrissey 1-4 (2f), B Murphy, T Fitzgerald 1-2 each, B Barry 0-2, J O'Connor, B Phelan, R Barry 0-1 each.	Report	T McGrane 1-6 (4f, 1 65), D Russell 1-2, N Bishop, S McHugh 0-1 each.
