= 1985 Dublin Senior Hurling Championship =

Annual hurling competition season

- Champions: Kilmacud Crokes (3rd title)
- Runners-up: O'Tooles

The 1985 Dublin Senior Hurling Championship was the 98th staging of the Dublin Senior Hurling Championship since its establishment by the Dublin County Board in 1887.

O'Tooles entered the championship as the defending champions.

The final was played on 12 July 1985 at Croke Park in Dublin, between Kilmacud Crokes and O'Tooles, in what was their second consecutive meeting in the final. Kilmacud Crokes won the match by 2–10 to 1–11 to claim their third championship title overall and a first in nine years.

== Results ==
=== Final ===
12 July 1985 Final	Kilmacud Crokes	2-10 - 1-11	O'Tooles	Croke Park
