= 1905 Dublin Senior Hurling Championship =

Annual hurling competition season

- Champions: Commercials (6th title)

The 1905 Dublin Senior Hurling Championship was the 18th staging of the Dublin Senior Hurling Championship since its establishment by the Dublin County Board in 1887.

Faughs entered the championship as the defending champions.

Commercials won their sixth championship title overall and a first title in six years.
