= 1904 Dublin Senior Hurling Championship =

Annual hurling competition season

- Champions: Faughs (5th title)
- Runners-up: Shannon Rovers

The 1904 Dublin Senior Hurling Championship was the 17th staging of the Dublin Senior Hurling Championship since its establishment by the Dublin County Board in 1887.

Faughs entered the championship as the defending champions.

The final was played on 16 July 1905 at Jones's Road in Dublin, between Faughs and Shannon Rovers, in what was their first ever meeting in the final. Faughs won the match by 5–08 to 2–04 to claim their fifth championship title overall and a fourth consecutive title.

== Results ==
=== Final ===
16 July 1905 Final	Faughs	5-08 - 2-04	Shannon Rovers	Jones's Road
