= 1977 Dublin Senior Hurling Championship =

Annual hurling competition season

- Champions: O'Tooles (2nd title)
- Runners-up: Faughs

The 1977 Dublin Senior Hurling Championship was the 90th staging of the Dublin Senior Hurling Championship since its establishment by the Dublin County Board in 1887.

Kilmacud Crokes entered the championship as the defending champions.

The final was played on 2 October 1977 at Parnell Park in Donnycarney, between O'Tooles and Faughs, in what was their fourth meeting in the final overall. O'Tooles won the match by 0–14 to 1–09 to claim their second championship title overall and a first title in eight years.

== Results ==
=== Final ===
2 October 1977 Final	O'Tooles	0-14 - 1-09	Faughs	Parnell Park
