= 1964 Dublin Senior Hurling Championship =

Annual hurling competition season

- Champions: St Vincent's (7th title)
- Runners-up: St Columba's

The 1964 Dublin Senior Hurling Championship was the 75th staging of the Dublin Senior Hurling Championship since its establishment by the Dublin County Board in 1887.

Junior Board Selection entered the championship as the defending champions.

The final was played on 4 October 1964 at Croke Park in Dublin, between St Vincent's and St Columba's, in what was their second meeting in the final overall. St Vincent's won the match by 1–10 to 1–05 to claim their seventh championship title overall and a first title in two years.

== Results ==
=== Final ===
| 4 October 1964 Final | St Vincent's | 1-10 - 1-05 | St Columba's | Croke Park |
