= 1954 Dublin Senior Hurling Championship =

Annual hurling competition season

- Champions: St Vincent's (2nd title)
- Runners-up: Faughs

The 1954 Dublin Senior Hurling Championship was the 67th staging of the Dublin Senior Hurling Championship since its establishment by the Dublin County Board in 1887.

St Vincent's entered the championship as the defending champions.

The final was played on 13 June 1954 at Croke Park in Dublin, between St Vincent's and Faughs, in what was their second meeting in the final overall. St Vincent's won the match by 4–08 to 2–07 to claim their second consecutive championship title.

== Results ==
=== Final ===
13 June 1954 Final	St Vincent's	4-08 - 2-07	Faughs	Croke Park
