= 1963 Dublin Senior Hurling Championship =

Annual hurling competition season

- Champions: Junior Board Selection (1st title)
- Runners-up: Young Irelands

The 1963 Dublin Senior Hurling Championship was the 76th staging of the Dublin Senior Hurling Championship since its establishment by the Dublin County Board in 1887.

St Vincent's entered the championship as the defending champions.

The final was played on 6 October 1963 at Croke Park in Dublin, between the Junior Board Selection - made up of players from Grocers, Air Corps and Crokes - and Young Irelands, in what was their first ever meeting in the final. The Junior Board Selection won the match by 4–13 to 2–06 to claim their first ever championship title.

== Results ==
=== Final ===
6 October 1963 Final	Junior Board Selection	4-13 - 2-06	Young Irelands	Croke Park
