= 1976 Dublin Senior Hurling Championship =

Annual hurling competition season

- Champions: Kilmacud Crokes (2nd title)
- Runners-up: Craobh Chiaráin

The 1976 Dublin Senior Hurling Championship was the 89th staging of the Dublin Senior Hurling Championship since its establishment by the Dublin County Board in 1887.

St Vincent's entered the championship as the defending champions.

The final was played on 18 July 1976 at Parnell Park in Donnycarney, between Kilmacud Crokes and Craobh Chiaráin, in what was their first ever meeting in the final. Kilmacud Crokes won the match by 0–17 to 2–08 to claim their second championship title overall and a first title in two years.

== Results ==
=== Final ===
18 July 1976 Final	Kilmacud Crokes	0-17 - 2-08	Craobh Chiaráin	Parnell Park
