= 2001 Dublin Senior Hurling Championship =

Annual hurling competition season

- Sponsor: Evening Herald
- Champions: Craobh Chiaráin (3rd title)
- Runners-up: Ballyboden St Enda's

The 2001 Dublin Senior Hurling Championship was the 114th staging of the Dublin Senior Hurling Championship since its establishment by the Dublin County Board in 1887.

University College Dublin entered the championship as the defending champions.

The final was played on 22 September 2001 at Parnell Park in Donnycarney, between Craobh Chiaráin and Ballyboden St Enda's, in what was their first ever meeting in the final. Craobh Chiaráin won the match by 2–11 to 1–13 to claim their third championship title overall and a first title in three years.

== Results ==
=== Final ===
22 September 2001 Final	Craobh Chiaráin	2-11 - 1-13	Ballyboden St Enda's	Parnell Park
	J McGuirk 1-1, D Kirwan 1-0, S McDonald, G Ennis 0-3 each, C Ring (1 f, 1 65) 0-2, C Hetherton, R Farrelly 0-1 each.	Report	D Curtin 0-8 (7f), C Keaney 1-1, D Sweeney 0-2, J Kenny, E Carroll 0-1 each.
