= 1962 Dublin Senior Hurling Championship =

Annual hurling competition season

- Champions: St Vincent's (6th title)
- Runners-up: St Columba's

The 1962 Dublin Senior Hurling Championship was the 75th staging of the Dublin Senior Hurling Championship since its establishment by the Dublin County Board in 1887.

University College Dublin entered the championship as the defending champions.

The final was played on 9 September 1962 at O'Toole Park in Crumlin, between St Vincent's and St Columba's, in what was their first ever meeting in the final. St Vincent's won the match by 3–10 to 3–02 to claim their sixth championship title overall and a first title in two years.

== Results ==
=== Final ===
9 September 1962 Final	St Vincent's	3-10 - 3-02	St Columba's	O'Toole Park
