= 1986 Dublin Senior Hurling Championship =

Annual hurling competition season

- Champions: Faughs (28th title)
- Runners-up: Erin's Isle

The 1986 Dublin Senior Hurling Championship was the 99th staging of the Dublin Senior Hurling Championship since its establishment by the Dublin County Board in 1887.

Kilmacud Crokes entered the championship as the defending champions.

The final was played on 1 August 1986 at Croke Park in Dublin, between Faughs and Erin's Isle, in what was their first ever meeting in the final. Faughs won the match by 1–07 to 1–04 to claim their 28th championship title overall and a first title in 13 years.

== Results ==
=== Final ===
1 August 1986 Final	Faughs	1-07 - 1-04	Erin's Isle	Croke Park
