= 1936 Dublin Senior Hurling Championship =

Annual hurling competition season

- Champions: Faughs (16th title)
- Runners-up: University College Dublin

The 1936 Dublin Senior Hurling Championship was the 49th staging of the Dublin Senior Hurling Championship since its establishment by the Dublin County Board in 1887.

Army Metro entered the championship as the defending champions.

The final was played on 7 June 1936 at Croke Park in Dublin, between Faughs and University College Dublin, in what was their first ever meeting in the final. Faughs won the match by 4–08 to 3–04 to claim their 16th championship title overall and a first title in six years.

== Results ==
=== Final ===
7 June 1936 Final	Faughs	4-08 - 3-04	University College Dublin	Croke Park
