= 1979 Dublin Senior Hurling Championship =

Annual hurling competition season

- Champions: Crumlin (2nd title)
- Runners-up: St Brendan's

The 1979 Dublin Senior Hurling Championship was the 92nd staging of the Dublin Senior Hurling Championship since its establishment by the Dublin County Board in 1887.

Crumlin entered the championship as the defending champions.

The final, a replay, was played on 7 October 1979 at Croke Park in Dublin, between Crumlin and St Brendan's, in what was their first ever meeting in the final. Crumlin won the match by 1–17 to 0–10 to claim their second consecutive championship title.

== Results ==
=== Final ===
24 August 1979 Final	Crumlin	0-10 - 0-10	St Brendan's	Croke Park

=== Final replay ===
7 October 1979 Final replay	Crumlin	1-17 - 0-10	St Brendan's	Croke Park
