= 1956 Dublin Senior Hurling Championship =

Annual hurling competition season

- Champions: St Columba's (1st title)
- Runners-up: New Irelands

The 1956 Dublin Senior Hurling Championship was the 69th staging of the Dublin Senior Hurling Championship since its establishment by the Dublin County Board in 1887.

St Vincent's entered the championship as the defending champions.

The final was played on 27 July 1956 at Croke Park in Dublin, between St Columba's and New Irelands, in what was their first ever meeting in the final. St Columba's won the match by 2–12 to 1–08 to claim their first ever championship title.

== Results ==
=== Final ===
27 July 1956 Final	St Columba's	2-12 - 1-08	New Irelands	Croke Park
