= 1980 Dublin Senior Hurling Championship =

Annual hurling competition season

- Champions: St Brendan's (1st title)
- Runners-up: Faughs

The 1980 Dublin Senior Hurling Championship was the 93rd staging of the Dublin Senior Hurling Championship since its establishment by the Dublin County Board in 1887.

Crumlin entered the championship as the defending champions.

The final was played on 25 July 1980 at Croke Park in Dublin, between St Brendan's and Faughs, in what was their first ever meeting in the final. St Brendan's won the match by 6–10 to 4–13 to claim their first ever championship title. It remains their only championship title.

== Results ==
=== Final ===
25 July 1980 Final	St Brendan's	6-10 - 4-13	Faughs	Croke Park
