= 1913 Dublin Senior Hurling Championship =

Annual hurling competition season

- Champions: Davis (1st title); J O'Callaghan (captain)
- Runners-up: Kickhams; B O'Brien (captain)

The 1913 Dublin Senior Hurling Championship was the 26th staging of the Dublin Senior Hurling Championship since its establishment by the Dublin County Board in 1887.

Rapparees entered the championship as the defending champions.

The final was played on 18 May 1913 at Jones's Road in Dublin, between Davis and Kickhams, in what was their first ever meeting in the final. Davis won the match by 4–07 to 2–00 to claim their first ever championship title overall.

== Results ==
=== Final ===
18 May 1913 Final	Davis	4-07 - 2-00	Kickhams	Jones's Road
