= 1918 Dublin Senior Hurling Championship =

Annual hurling competition season

- Champions: Collegians (2nd title); John Ryan (captain)
- Runners-up: Faughs

The 1918 Dublin Senior Hurling Championship was the 31st staging of the Dublin Senior Hurling Championship since its establishment by the Dublin County Board in 1887.

Collegians entered the championship as the defending champions.

The final was played on 30 June 1918 at Croke Park in Dublin, between Collegians and Faughs, in what was their second consecutive meeting in the final. Collegians won the match by 3–00 to 0–05 to claim their second consecutive championship title.

== Results ==
=== Final ===
30 June 1918 Final	Collegians	3-00 - 0-05	Faughs	Croke Park
