= 1968 Dublin Senior Hurling Championship =

Annual hurling competition season

- Champions: University College Dublin (5th title)
- Runners-up: Kilmacud Crokes

The 1968 Dublin Senior Hurling Championship was the 81st staging of the Dublin Senior Hurling Championship since its establishment by the Dublin County Board in 1887.

St Vincent's entered the championship as the defending champions.

The final, a repplay, was played on 10 November 1968 at Croke Park in Dublin, between University College Dublin and Kilmacud Crokes, in what was their first ever meeting in the final. University College Dublin won the match by 7–09 to 2–08 to claim their fifth championship title overall and a first title in seven years.

== Results ==
=== Final ===
27 October 1968 Final	University College Dublin	3-08 - 3-08	Kilmacud Crokes	O'Toole Park

=== Final replay ===
10 November 1968 Final replay	University College Dublin	7-09 - 2-08	Kilmacud Crokes	Croke Park
