= 1917 Dublin Senior Hurling Championship =

Annual hurling competition season

- Champions: Collegians (1st title); John Ryan (captain)
- Runners-up: Faughs; Jim Cleary (captain)

The 1917 Dublin Senior Hurling Championship was the 30th staging of the Dublin Senior Hurling Championship since its establishment by the Dublin County Board in 1887.

Commercials entered the championship as the defending champions.

The final was played on 17 June 1917 at Croke Park in Dublin, between Collegians and Faughs, in what was their second meeting in the final overall. Collegians won the match by 3–05 to 1–05 to claim their first ever championship title.

== Results ==
=== Final ===
17 June 1917 Final	Collegians	3-05 - 1-05	Faughs	Croke Park
