= 1925 Dublin Senior Hurling Championship =

Annual hurling competition season

- Champions: Garda (1st title); Mick Gill (captain)
- Runners-up: Faughs

The 1925 Dublin Senior Hurling Championship was the 38th staging of the Dublin Senior Hurling Championship since its establishment by the Dublin County Board in 1887.

Kickhams entered the championship as the defending champions.

The final was played on 9 August 1925 at Croke Park in Dublin, between Garda and Faughs, in what was their first ever meeting in the final. Garda won the match by 6–03 to 3–03 to claim their first ever championship title.

== Results ==
=== Final ===
9 August 1925 Final	Garda	6-03 - 3-03	Faughs	Croke Park
