= 1959 Dublin Senior Hurling Championship =

Annual hurling competition season

- Champions: New Irelands (2nd title)
- Runners-up: St Vincent's

The 1959 Dublin Senior Hurling Championship was the 72nd staging of the Dublin Senior Hurling Championship since its establishment by the Dublin County Board in 1887.

New Irelands entered the championship as the defending champions.

The final was played on 13 September 1959 at Croke Park in Dublin, between New Irelands and St Vincent's, in what was their second meeting in the final overall. New Irelands won the match by 2–11 to 2–06 to claim their second consecutive championship title.

== Results ==
=== Final ===
13 September 1959 Final	New Irelands	2-11 - 2-06	St Vincent's	Croke Park
