= 1966 Dublin Senior Hurling Championship =

Annual hurling competition season

- Champions: Crokes (1st title)
- Runners-up: St Columba's

The 1966 Dublin Senior Hurling Championship was the 77th staging of the Dublin Senior Hurling Championship since its establishment by the Dublin County Board in 1887.

Young Irelands entered the championship as the defending champions.

The final was played on 2 October 1966 at Croke Park in Dublin, between Crokes and St Columba's, in what was their first ever meeting in the final. Crokes won the match by 6–07 to 7–03 to claim their first ever championship title.

== Results ==
=== Final ===
| 2 October 1966 Final | Crokes | 6-07 - 7-03 | St Columba's | Croke Park |
