= 1945 Dublin Senior Hurling Championship =

Annual hurling competition season

- Champions: Faughs (21st title)
- Runners-up: University College Dublin

The 1945 Dublin Senior Hurling Championship was the 58th staging of the Dublin Senior Hurling Championship since its establishment by the Dublin County Board in 1887.

Faughs entered the championship as the defending champions.

The final was played on 3 June 1945 at Croke Park in Dublin, between Faughs and University College Dublin, in what was their second meeting in the final overall. Faughs won the match by 5–06 to 4–05 to claim their 21st championship title overall and a second consecutive title.

== Results ==
=== Final ===
| 3 June 1945 Final | Faughs | 5-06 - 4-05 | University College Dublin | Croke Park |
