= 1978 Dublin Senior Hurling Championship =

Annual hurling competition season

- Champions: Crumlin (1st title)
- Runners-up: Faughs

The 1978 Dublin Senior Hurling Championship was the 91st staging of the Dublin Senior Hurling Championship since its establishment by the Dublin County Board in 1887.

O'Tooles entered the championship as the defending champions.

The final was played on 28 July 1978 at Croke Park in Dublin, between Crumlin and Faughs, in what was their first ever meeting in the final. Crumlin won the match by 3–13 to 1–11 to claim their first ever championship title.

== Results ==
=== Final ===
28 July 1978 Final	Crumlin	3-13 - 1-11	Faughs	Croke Park
