= 1988 Dublin Senior Hurling Championship =

Annual hurling competition season

- Champions: St Vincent's (12th title)
- Runners-up: Ballyboden St Enda's

The 1988 Dublin Senior Hurling Championship was the 101st staging of the Dublin Senior Hurling Championship since its establishment by the Dublin County Board in 1887.

Faughs entered the championship as the defending champions.

The final was played on 25 September 1988 at Parnell Park in Donnycarney, between St Vincent's and Ballyboden St Enda's, in what was their first ever meeting in the final. St Vincent's won the match by 2–16 to 1–14 to claim their 12th championship title overall and a first title in six years.

== Results ==
=== Final ===
25 September 1988 Final	St Vincent's	2-16 - 1-14	Ballyboden St Enda's	Parnell Park
