= 1896 Dublin Senior Hurling Championship =

Annual hurling competition season

- Champions: Commercials (2nd title)
- Runners-up: Rapparees

The 1896 Dublin Senior Hurling Championship was the 10th staging of the Dublin Senior Hurling Championship since its establishment by the Dublin County Board in 1887.

Commercials entered the championship as the defending champions.

The final was played on 18 October 1896 at Clonturk Park in Dublin, between Commercials and Rapparees, in what was their first ever meeting in the final. Commercials won the match by 0–12 to 0–01 to claim their second consecutive championship title.

== Results ==
=== Final ===
18 October 1896 Final	Commercials	0-12 - 0-01	Rapparees	Clonturk Park
