= 1957 Dublin Senior Hurling Championship =

Annual hurling competition season

- Champions: St Vincent's (4th title)
- Runners-up: New Irelands

The 1957 Dublin Senior Hurling Championship was the 70th staging of the Dublin Senior Hurling Championship since its establishment by the Dublin County Board in 1887.

St Columba's entered the championship as the defending champions.

The final was played on 16 June 1957 at Croke Park in Dublin, between St Vincent's and New Irelands, in what was their second consecutive meeting in the final. St Vincent's won the match by 3–10 to 3–04 to claim their fourth championship title overall and a first title in two years.

== Results ==
=== Final ===
16 June 1957 Final	St Vincent's	3-10 - 3-04	New Irelands	Croke Park
