= 1935 Dublin Senior Hurling Championship =

Annual hurling competition season

- Champions: Army Metro (2nd title)
- Runners-up: University College Dublin

The 1935 Dublin Senior Hurling Championship was the 48th staging of the Dublin Senior Hurling Championship since its establishment by the Dublin County Board in 1887.

University College Dublin entered the championship as the defending champions.

The final was played on 2 June 1935 at Croke Park in Dublin, between Army Metro and University College Dublin, in what was their first ever meeting in the final. Army Metro won the match by 3–04 to 1–04 to claim their second championship title overall and a first title in two years.

== Results ==
=== Final ===
2 June 1935 Final	Army Metro	3-04 - 1-04	University College Dublin	Croke Park
