= 1960 Dublin Senior Hurling Championship =

Annual hurling competition season

- Champions: St Vincent's (5th title)
- Runners-up: New Irelands

The 1960 Dublin Senior Hurling Championship was the 73rd staging of the Dublin Senior Hurling Championship since its establishment by the Dublin County Board in 1887.

New Irelands entered the championship as the defending champions.

The final was played on 3 July 1960 at Croke Park in Dublin, between St Vincent's and New Irelands, in what was their second consecutive meeting in the final. St Vincent's won the match by 3–10 to 2–06 to claim their fifth championship title overall and a first title in three years.

== Results ==
=== Final ===
3 July 1960 Final	St Vincent's	3-10 - 2-06	New Irelands	Croke Park
