= 1944 Dublin Senior Hurling Championship =

Annual hurling competition season

- Champions: Faughs (20th title)
- Runners-up: Eoghan Ruadh

The 1944 Dublin Senior Hurling Championship was the 57th staging of the Dublin Senior Hurling Championship since its establishment by the Dublin County Board in 1887.

Young Irelands entered the championship as the defending champions.

The final was played on 11 June 1944 at Croke Park in Dublin, between Faughs and Eoghan Ruadh, in what was their fourth meeting in the final overall. Faughs won the match by 2–11 to 2–08 to claim their 20th championship title overall and a first title in three years.

== Results ==
=== Final ===
11 June 1944 Final	Faughs	2-11 - 2-08	Eoghan Ruadh	Croke Park
