= 1934 Dublin Senior Hurling Championship =

Annual hurling competition season

- Champions: University College Dublin (1st title)
- Runners-up: Young Irelands

The 1934 Dublin Senior Hurling Championship was the 47th staging of the Dublin Senior Hurling Championship since its establishment by the Dublin County Board in 1887.

Army Metro entered the championship as the defending champions.

The final was played on 27 May 1934 at Croke Park in Dublin, between University College Dublin and Young Irelands, in what was their second meeting in the final overall. UCD won the match by 4–05 to 2–04 to claim their first ever championship title.

== Results ==
=== Final ===
27 May 1934 Final	University College Dublin	4-05 - 2-04	Young Irelands	Croke Park
