= 1930 Dublin Senior Hurling Championship =

Annual hurling competition season

- Champions: Faughs (15th title)
- Runners-up: Garda

The 1930 Dublin Senior Hurling Championship was the 43rd staging of the Dublin Senior Hurling Championship since its establishment by the Dublin County Board in 1887.

Garda entered the championship as the defending champions.

The final was played on 18 May 1930 at Croke Park in Dublin, between Faughs and Garda, in what was their fourth meeting in the final overall. Faughs won the match by 2–03 to 1–01 to claim their 15th championship title overall and a first title in seven years.

== Results ==
=== Final ===
18 May 1930 Final	Faughs	2-03 - 1-01	Garda	Croke Park
