= 1950 Dublin Senior Hurling Championship =

Annual hurling competition season

- Champions: Faughs (23rd title)
- Runners-up: University College Dublin

The 1950 Dublin Senior Hurling Championship was the 63rd staging of the Dublin Senior Hurling Championship since its establishment by the Dublin County Board in 1887.

Young Irelands entered the championship as the defending champions.

The final was played on 4 June 1950 at Croke Park in Dublin, between Faughs and University College Dublin, in what was their fifth meeting in the final overall. Faughs won the match by 5–05 to 2–10 to claim their 23rd championship title overall and a first title in four years.

== Results ==
=== Final ===
| 4 June 1950 Final | Faughs | 5-05 - 2-10 | University College Dublin | Croke Park |
