= 1927 Dublin Senior Hurling Championship =

Annual hurling competition season

- Champions: Garda (3rd title)
- Runners-up: Faughs

The 1927 Dublin Senior Hurling Championship was the 40th staging of the Dublin Senior Hurling Championship since its establishment by the Dublin County Board in 1887.

Garda entered the championship as the defending champions.

The final was played on 24 April 1927 at Croke Park in Dublin, between Garda and Faughs, in what was their second meeting in the final overall. Garda won the match by 4–06 to 3–02 to claim their third consecutive championship title.

== Results ==
=== Final ===
24 April 1927 Final	Garda	4-06 - 3-02	Faughs	Croke Park
