= 1919 Dublin Senior Hurling Championship =

Annual hurling competition season

- Champions: Collegians (3rd title)
- Runners-up: Faughs

The 1919 Dublin Senior Hurling Championship was the 32nd staging of the Dublin Senior Hurling Championship since its establishment by the Dublin County Board in 1887.

Collegians entered the championship as the defending champions.

The final was played on 29 June 1919 at Croke Park in Dublin, between Collegians and Faughs, in what was their third consecutive meeting in the final. Collegians won the match by 8–05 to 2–01 to claim their third consecutive championship title.

== Results ==
=== Final ===
29 June 1919 Final	Collegians	8-05 - 2-01	Faughs	Croke Park
