= 1953 Dublin Senior Hurling Championship =

Annual hurling competition season

- Champions: St Vincent's (1st title)
- Runners-up: Civil Service

The 1953 Dublin Senior Hurling Championship was the 66th staging of the Dublin Senior Hurling Championship since its establishment by the Dublin County Board in 1887.

Faughs entered the championship as the defending champions.

The final was played on 14 June 1953 at Croke Park in Dublin, between St Vincent's and Civil Service, in what was their first ever meeting in the final. St Vincent's won the match by 4–10 to 3–05 to claim their first ever championship title.

== Results ==
=== Final ===
14 June 1953 Final	St Vincent's	4-10 - 3-05	Civil Service	Croke Park
				Attendance: 12,912
