= 1922 Dublin Senior Hurling Championship =

Annual hurling competition season

- Champions: Faughs (13th title)
- Runners-up: Grocers

The 1922 Dublin Senior Hurling Championship was the 35th staging of the Dublin Senior Hurling Championship since its establishment by the Dublin County Board in 1887.

Faughs entered the championship as the defending champions.

The final was played on 25 June 1922 at Croke Park in Dublin, between Faughs and Grocers, in what was their second consecutive meeting in the final. Faughs won the match by 9–02 to 2–01 to claim their 13th championship title overall and a third consecutive title.

== Results ==
=== Final ===
25 June 1922 Final	Faughs	9-02 - 2-01	Grocers	Croke Park
