= 2008 Dublin Senior Hurling Championship =

Annual hurling competition season

- Sponsor: Evening Herald
- Champions: Ballyboden St Enda's (2nd title); David Sweeney (captain); Liam Hogan (manager)
- Runners-up: Kilmacud Crokes

The 2008 Dublin Senior Hurling Championship was the 121st staging of the Dublin Senior Hurling Championship since its establishment by the Dublin County Board in 1887.

Ballyboden St Enda's entered the championship as the defending champions.

The final was played on 1 November 2008 at Parnell Park in Donnycarney, between Ballyboden St Enda's and Kilmacud Crokes, in what was their first ever meeting in the final. Ballyboden St Enda's won the match by 0–17 to 0–07 to claim their second championship title overall and a second consecutive title.

== Results ==
=== Final ===
| 1 November 2008 Final | Ballyboden St Enda's | 0-17 - 0-07 | Kilmacud Crokes | Parnell Park |
| | | Report |
