= 1921 Dublin Senior Hurling Championship =

Annual hurling competition season

- Champions: Faughs (12th title)
- Runners-up: Grocers

The 1921 Dublin Senior Hurling Championship was the 34th staging of the Dublin Senior Hurling Championship since its establishment by the Dublin County Board in 1887.

Faughs entered the championship as the defending champions.

The final was played on 3 July 1921 at Croke Park in Dublin, between Faughs and Grocers, in what was their first ever meeting in the final. Faughs won the match by 6–03 to 1–02 to claim their 12th championship title overall and a second consecutive title.

== Results ==
=== Final ===
3 July 1921 Final	Faughs	6-03 - 1-02	Grocers	Croke Park
