= 1901 Dublin Senior Hurling Championship =

Annual hurling competition season

- Champions: Faughs (3rd title); D McCormack (captain)
- Runners-up: Southern Rovers; P Ryan (captain)

The 1901 Dublin Senior Hurling Championship was the 15th staging of the Dublin Senior Hurling Championship since its establishment by the Dublin County Board in 1887.

Faughs entered the championship as the defending champions.

The final was played on 24 November 1901 at Jones's Road in Dublin, between Faughs and Southern Rovers, in what was their first ever meeting in the final overall. Faughs won the match by 3–05 to 1–07 to claim their third championship title overall and a second consecutive title.

== Results ==
=== Final ===
24 November 1901 Final	Faughs	3-05 - 1-07	Southern Rovers	Jones's Road
