= 2010 Dublin Senior Hurling Championship =

Annual hurling competition season

- Sponsor: Evening Herald
- Champions: Ballyboden St Enda's (4th title); Gary Maguire (captain); Liam Hogan (manager)
- Runners-up: St Vincent's

The 2010 Dublin Senior Hurling Championship was the 123rd staging of the Dublin Senior Hurling Championship since its establishment by the Dublin County Board in 1887.

Ballyboden St Enda's entered the championship as the defending champions.

The final was played on 31 October 2010 at Parnell Park in Donnycarney, between Ballyboden St Enda's and St Vincent's, in what was their third meeting in the final overall. Ballyboden St Enda's won the match by 3–17 to 1–10 to claim their fourth championship title overall and a fourth consecutive title.

== Results ==
=== Final ===
31 October 2010 Final	Ballyboden St Enda's	3-17 - 1-10	St Vincent's	Parnell Park
		Report
