= 1946 Dublin Senior Hurling Championship =

Annual hurling competition season

- Champions: Faughs (22nd title)
- Runners-up: Young Irelands

The 1946 Dublin Senior Hurling Championship was the 59th staging of the Dublin Senior Hurling Championship since its establishment by the Dublin County Board in 1887.

Faughs entered the championship as the defending champions.

The final was played on 9 June 1946 at Croke Park in Dublin, between Faughs and Young Irelands, in what was their first ever meeting in the final. Faughs won the match by 7–05 to 0–05 to claim their 22nd championship title overall and a third consecutive title.

== Results ==
=== Final ===
9 June 1946 Final	Faughs	7-05 - 0-05	Young Irelands	Croke Park
