= 1940 Dublin Senior Hurling Championship =

Annual hurling competition season

- Champions: Faughs (18th title)
- Runners-up: Eoghan Ruadh

The 1940 Dublin Senior Hurling Championship was the 53rd staging of the Dublin Senior Hurling Championship since its establishment by the Dublin County Board in 1887.

Faughs entered the championship as the defending champions.

The final was played on 16 June 1940 at Croke Park in Dublin, between Faughs and Eoghan Ruadh, in what was their second consecutive meeting in the final. Faughs won the match by 3–05 to 1–10 to claim their 18th championship title overall and a second consecutive title.

== Results ==
=== Final ===
16 June 1940 Final	Faughs	3-05 - 1-10	Eoghan Ruadh	Croke Park
