= 1907 Dublin Senior Hurling Championship =

Annual hurling competition season

- Champions: Commercials (7th title); P. Hayes (captain)
- Runners-up: Faughs; D. McCormack (captain)

The 1907 Dublin Senior Hurling Championship was the 20th staging of the Dublin Senior Hurling Championship since its establishment by the Dublin County Board in 1887.

Faughs entered the championship as the defending champions.

The final was played on 2 February 1908 at Jones' Road in Dublin, between Commercials and Faughs, in what was their second consecutive meeting in the final. Commercials won the match by 2–04 to 0–09 to claim their seventh championship title overall and a first title in two years.

== Results ==
=== Final ===
2 February 1908 Final	Commercials	2-04 - 0-09	Faughs	Jones' Road
