= 1967 Dublin Senior Hurling Championship =

Annual hurling competition season

- Champions: St Vincent's (8th title)
- Runners-up: St Columba's

The 1967 Dublin Senior Hurling Championship was the 80th staging of the Dublin Senior Hurling Championship since its establishment by the Dublin County Board in 1887.

Crokes entered the championship as the defending champions.

The final was played on 9 July 1967 at Croke Park in Dublin, between St Vincent's and St Columba's, in what was their third meeting in the final overall. St Vincent's won the match by 3–13 to 1–09 to claim their eighth championship title overall and a first title in three years.

== Results ==
=== Final ===
| 9 July 1967 Final | St Vincent's | 3-13 - 1-09 | St Columba's | Parnell Park |
