= 1984 Dublin Senior Hurling Championship =

Annual hurling competition season

- Champions: O'Tooles (3rd title)
- Runners-up: Kilmacud Crokes

The 1984 Dublin Senior Hurling Championship was the 97th staging of the Dublin Senior Hurling Championship since its establishment by the Dublin County Board in 1887.

Erin's Isle, the defending champions, were beaten by Kilmacud Crokes in the quarter-finals.

The final was played on 27 July 1984 at Croke Park in Dublin, between O'Tooles and Kilmacud Crokes, in what was their first ever meeting in the final. O'Tooles won the match by 0–14 to 0–10 to claim their third championship title overall and first in seven years.

== Results ==
=== Final ===
27 July 1984 Final	O'Tooles	0-14 - 0-10	Kilmacud Crokes	Croke Park
