= 1970 Dublin Senior Hurling Championship =

Annual hurling competition season

- Dates: 19 April – 13 September 1970
- Teams: 17
- Champions: Faughs (25th title); Paddy Spellman (captain)
- Runners-up: St Vincent's

Tournament statistics
- Matches played: 17
- Goals scored: 104 (6.12 per match)
- Points scored: 302 (17.76 per match)
- Top scorer(s): Billy Dwyer (5–05)

The 1970 Dublin Senior Hurling Championship was the 83rd staging of the Dublin Senior Hurling Championship since its establishment by the Dublin County Board in 1887. The championship ran from 19 April to 13 September 1970.

O'Tooles entered the championship as the defending champions.

The final was played on 13 September 1970 at Croke Park in Dublin, between Faughs and St Vincent's, in what was their fourth meeting in the final overall. Faughs won the match by 5–15 to 3–09 to claim their 25th championship title overall and a first title in 18 years.

== Results ==
=== Preliminary round ===
19 April 1970 Preliminary round	Erin's Hope	3-03 - 7-13	New Irelands	O'Toole Park
	M Patwell 2-0, T Gubbins 0-2, M Troy 1-1.		J Cronin 3-0, M Byrne 2-2, P Hennessy 2-0, J Doherty 0-4, J Jones 0-2, C Hayes 0-2, L Byrne 0-2, S O'Leary 0-1.

=== First round ===
19 April 1970 First round	O'Tooles	1-09 - 1-05	Good Counsel	Parnell Park
	J Wallace 1-3, J O'Meara 0-2, J Quinn 0-1, M McElhenny 0-1, D Mulligan 0-1, J Murphy 0-1.		D Earley 1-0, H Dalton 0-3, M Treacy 0-1, J McCormack 0-1.

19 April 1970 First round	St Oliver Plunketts/Eoghan Ruadh	2-04 - 6-12	Kilmacud Crokes	Islandbridge Grounds
	P Quinn 1-2, M Lambe 1-0, P O'Brien 0-1, R Begley 0-1.		T Ring 0-7, J Maher 2-0, M Fox 1-1, M Aherne 1-0, J Daly 1-0, S McDonnell 1-0, N Dwyer 0-2, M Regan 0-2.

19 April 1970 First round	University College Dublin	3-09 - 3-03	Naomh Fionnbarra	Parnell Park
	J McCarthy 1-3, Donal Kavanagh 1-1, W Dooley 1-0, D Kavanagh 0-3, P O'Connell 0-2.		R McCarthy 1-0, P Lowry 1-1, T Mullane 1-1, P Keogh 0-1.

17 May 1970 First round	Crumln	5-07 - 4-07	Craobh Chiaráin	Parnell Park
	T Grealish 2-0, K Malone 1-1, S Poole 1-1, A Boothman 1-0, E Hudson 0-3, P Maycock 0-1, B Galvin 0-1.		E Flynn 2-2, P Kenny 1-0, J Burke 1-1, J Elliot 0-3, D Rhinisch 0-1.

3 May 1970 First round	Faughs	2-14 - 0-09	Civil Service	O'Toole Park
	M Kennedy 1-3, S White 1-1, J Aherne 0-3, B Quinn 0-2, B Dwyer 0-2, S Buckley 0-2, M Dervin 0-1.		S Hurley 0-5, T Field 0-2, P O'Rourke 0-1, J Feehan 0-1.

6 May 1970 First round	St Vincent's	3-10 - 4-04	Junior Board Selection	O'Toole Park
	C Hanley 2-2, R Copeland 1-0, P Fitzgerald 0-3, T Hanahoe 0-2, J Keaveney 0-1, G O'Driscoll 0-1, C Leaney 0-1.		S Gibbons 2-0, S Kinsella 1-1, M Wallace 1-1, B Maher 0-1, J Kenny 0-1.

17 May 1970 First round	Young Irelands	4-08 - 3-10	Scoil Uí Chonaill	Parnell Park
	P Croke 2-2, T Houlihan 1-2, T O'Brien 1-0, L Heffernan 0-2, W Nolan 0-1, P Kennedy 0-1.		S Bohan 1-2, A Desmond 0-4, B Sunderland 1-0, P Flanagan 1-0, J Rooney 0-2, D Bohan 0-1, L Flood 0-1.

17 May 1970 First round	Na Fianna	0-06 - 2-16	New Irelands	O'Toole Park
	N Hennessy 0-3, P Kennedy 0-1, L Murray 0-1, E Burke 0-1.		L Byrne 0-7, P Hennessy 1-3, T Cronin 1-0, T O'Donnell 0-2, S O'Leary 0-2, O Murphy 0-2.

=== Quarter-finals ===
17 May 1970 Quarter-final	Kilmacud Crokes	6-18 - 4-12	University College Dublin	Parnell Park
	M Fox 2-3, N Dwyer 2-3, M Regan 1-5, J Maher 1-1, T Ring 0-4, M Aherne 0-1, M Sweeney 0-1.		P O'Connor 2-4, J Broderick 1-3, G McCarthy 1-3, J Russell 0-1, J Ryan 0-1.

26 June 1970 Quarter-final	Faughs	5-16 - 1-06	Young Irelands	Parnell Park
	J Conway 3-2, S Buckley 1-3, R Dwyer 1-1, M Derivan 0-3, F Condon 0-2, S White 0-2, M Kennedy 0-1, J Aherne 0-1, L White 0-1.		P Croke 1-2, L Kiely 0-4.

28 June 1970 Quarter-final	New Irelands	3-05 - 3-04	Crumlin	Parnell Park
	T Blackmore 2-1, T Cronin 1-0, P Farrell 0-1, C Hayes 0-1, L Byrne 0-1, P Hennessy 0-1.		P Madden 2-0, S Poole 1-0, P Maycock 0-3, T Grealish 0-1.

28 June 1970 Quarter-final replay	St Vincent's	4-07 - 3-10	O'Tooles	Parnell Park
	R Copeland 2-3, J Keaveney 1-1, T Hanahoe 1-0, F Fitzgerald 0-2, G O'Driscoll 0-1.		W Wallace 2-0, J Wallace 0-5, F Murphy 1-1, D Mulligan 0-1, D O'Donnell 0-1, S O'Meara 0-1, D Sheehan 0-1.

26 July 1970 Quarter-final	St Vincent's	3-06 - 1-05	O'Tooles	Parnell Park
	M O'Hanlon 2-1, P Lee 1-0, C Leaney 0-2, E Malone 0-1, G O'Driscoll 0-1, J Keaveney 0-1.		M McIlhinney 1-2, F Murphy 0-2, J Wallace 0-1.

=== Semi-finals ===
24 July 1970 Semi-final	Faughs	3-07 - 1-10	Kilmacud Crokes	Parnell Park
	B Dwyer 2-1, S Whyte 1-0, M Derrivan 0-3, J Hearne 0-1, J Conway 0-1, L Whyte 0-1.		M Bermingham 1-1, T Ring 0-3, N Dwyer 0-3, M Fox 0-2, B Cooney 0-1.

23 August 1970 Semi-final	St Vincent's	5-09 - 1-14	New Irelands	Parnell Park
	T Hanahoe 2-2, M Hanlon 1-2, F Fitzgerald 1-0, B Leaney 1-0, J Keaveney 0-3, R Copeland 0-1, C Hanley 0-1.		M Byrne 1-2, J Doherty 0-5, C Hayes 0-3, T Cronin 0-2, L Burns 0-2.

=== Final ===
13 September 1970 Final	Faughs	5-15 - 3-09	St Vincent's	Croke Park
	B Dwyer 2-1, S Buckley 1-4, V Loftus 1-3, S White 1-0, J Hearne 0-2, L White 0-1, M Kennedy 0-1, M Derivan 0-1, J Conway 0-1, F Condon 0-1,		J Keaveney 1-2, F Fitzgerald 1-0, M O'Hanlon 1-0, R Copeland 0-2, C Leaney 0-2, G O'Driscoll 0-2, T Hanahoe 0-1.
