= 1920 Dublin Senior Hurling Championship =

Annual hurling competition season

- Champions: Faughs (11th title)
- Runners-up: Kickhams

The 1920 Dublin Senior Hurling Championship was the 33rd staging of the Dublin Senior Hurling Championship since its establishment by the Dublin County Board in 1887.

Collegians entered the championship as the defending champions.

The final was played on 25 July 1920 at Croke Park in Dublin, between Faughs and Kickhams, in what was their third meeting in the final overall. Faughs won the match by 3–04 to 1–00 to claim their 11th championship title overall and a first title in five years.

== Results ==
=== Final ===
25 July 1920 Final	Faughs	3-04 - 1-00	Kickhams	Croke Park
