= 1983 Dublin Senior Hurling Championship =

Annual hurling competition season

- Champions: Erin's Isle (1st title)
- Runners-up: Ballyboden St Enda's

The 1983 Dublin Senior Hurling Championship was the 96th staging of the Dublin Senior Hurling Championship since its establishment by the Dublin County Board in 1887.

St Vincent's entered the championship as the defending champions.

The final was played on 8 October 1983 at Croke Park in Dublin, between Erin's Isle and Ballyboden St Enda's, in what was their first ever meeting in the final. Erin's Isle won the match by 2–09 to 2–06 to claim their first ever championship title. As of December 2025, it remains their only championship title.

== Results ==
=== Final ===
8 October 1983 Final	Erin's Isle	2-09 - 2-06	Ballyboden St Enda's	Croke Park
