= 1990 Dublin Senior Hurling Championship =

Annual hurling competition season

- Champions: O'Tooles (4th title)
- Runners-up: St Vincent's

The 1990 Dublin Senior Hurling Championship was the 103rd staging of the Dublin Senior Hurling Championship since its establishment by the Dublin County Board in 1887.

Cuala entered the championship as the defending champions.

The final, a replay, was played on 29 July 1990 at Parnell Park in Donnycarney, between O'Tooles and St Vincent's, in what was their third meeting in the final overall. O'Tooles won the match by 2–16 to 1–13 to claim their fourth championship title overall and a first title in six years.

== Results ==
=== Final ===
| 22 July 1990 Final | O'Tooles | 0-14 - 1-11 | St Vincent's | Parnell Park |
| | P Carton 0-9, J Morris 0-2, P Kavanagh 0-1, P Quinlan 0-1, P Dwyer 0-1. | | S McDermott 0-4, P Tobin 0-3, S Dalton 1-0, G Regan 0-2, G Mulcahy 0-1, S Fleming 0-1. |

=== Final replay ===
| 29 July 1990 Final replay | O'Tooles | 2-16 - 1-13 | St Vincent's | Parnell Park |
| | P Carton 0-8, M Morris 1-3, P Smith 1-2, P Pringle 0-1, D O'Brien 0-1, P Dwyer 0-1. | | S McDermott 1-4, T Jennings 0-3, S Fleming 0-2, P McManus 0-2, T Conroy 0-2. |
