= 1975 Dublin Senior Hurling Championship =

Annual hurling competition season

- Champions: St Vincent's (9th title)
- Runners-up: Craobh Chiaráin

The 1975 Dublin Senior Hurling Championship was the 88th staging of the Dublin Senior Hurling Championship since its establishment by the Dublin County Board in 1887.

Kilmacud Crokes entered the championship as the defending champions.

The final was played on 12 October 1975 at Croke Park in Dublin, between St Vincent's and Craobh Chiaráin, in what was their second meeting in the final overall. St Vincent's won the match by 4–08 to 1–11 to claim their ninth championship title overall and a first title in eight years.

== Results ==
=== Final ===
12 October 1975 Final	St Vincent's	4-08 - 1-11	Craobh Chiaráin	Croke Park
