= 1958 Dublin Senior Hurling Championship =

Annual hurling competition season

- Champions: New Irelands (1st title)
- Runners-up: Faughs

The 1958 Dublin Senior Hurling Championship was the 71st staging of the Dublin Senior Hurling Championship since its establishment by the Dublin County Board in 1887.

St Vincent's entered the championship as the defending champions.

The final was played on 25 May 1958 at Croke Park in Dublin, between New Irelands and Faughs, in what was their first ever meeting in the final. New Irelands won the match by 4–11 to 0–08 to claim their first ever championship title.

== Results ==
=== Final ===
25 May 1958 Final	New Irelands	4-11 - 0-08	Faughs	Croke Park
