= 1937 Dublin Senior Hurling Championship =

Annual hurling competition season

- Champions: Young Irelands (2nd title)
- Runners-up: University College Dublin

The 1937 Dublin Senior Hurling Championship was the 50th staging of the Dublin Senior Hurling Championship since its establishment by the Dublin County Board in 1887.

Faughs entered the championship as the defending champions.

The final was played on 6 June 1937 at Croke Park in Dublin, between Young Irelands and University College Dublin, in what was their third meeting in the final overall. Young Irelands won the match by 7–04 to 2–04 to claim their second championship title overall and a first title in five years.

== Results ==
=== Final ===
6 June 1937 Final	Young Irelands	7-04 - 2-04	University College Dublin	Croke Park
