= 1928 Dublin Senior Hurling Championship =

Annual hurling competition season

- Champions: Garda (4th title)
- Runners-up: Faughs

The 1928 Dublin Senior Hurling Championship was the 41st staging of the Dublin Senior Hurling Championship since its establishment by the Dublin County Board in 1887.

Garda entered the championship as the defending champions.

The final was played on 29 April 1928 at Croke Park in Dublin, between Garda and Faughs, in what was their third meeting in the final overall. Garda won the match by 3–04 to 1–01 to claim their fourth consecutive championship title.

== Results ==
=== Final ===
29 April 1928 Final	Garda	3-04 - 1-01	Faughs	Croke Park
