= 1900 Dublin Senior Hurling Championship =

Annual hurling competition season

- Champions: Faughs (2nd title)
- Runners-up: Grocers

The 1900 Dublin Senior Hurling Championship was the 14th staging of the Dublin Senior Hurling Championship since its establishment by the Dublin County Board in 1887.

Commercials entered the championship as the defending champions.

The final was played on 31 March 1901 at Jones's Road in Dublin, between Faughs and Grocers, in what was their first ever meeting in the final overall. Faughs won the match by 5–04 to 0–04 to claim their second championship title overall and a first title in eight years.

== Results ==
=== Final ===
31 March 1901 Final	Faughs	5-04 - 0-04	Grocers	Jones's Road
