= 2000 Dublin Senior Hurling Championship =

Annual hurling competition season

- Sponsor: Evening Herald
- Champions: University College Dublin (6th title); Brian Walton (captain); Brendan Carroll (manager)
- Runners-up: St Vincent's

The 2000 Dublin Senior Hurling Championship was the 113th staging of the Dublin Senior Hurling Championship since its establishment by the Dublin County Board in 1887.

Faughs entered the championship as the defending champions.

The final was played on 8 October 2000 at Parnell Park in Donnycarney, between University College Dublin and St Vincent's, in what was their second meeting in the final overall. University College Dublin won the match by 3–15 to 1–09 to claim their sixth championship title overall and a first title in 32 years.

== Results ==
=== Final ===
8 October 2000 Final	University College Dublin	3-15 - 1-09	St Vincent's	Parnell Park
