= 1951 Dublin Senior Hurling Championship =

Annual hurling competition season

- Champions: Eoghan Ruadh (1st title)
- Runners-up: St Vincent's

The 1951 Dublin Senior Hurling Championship was the 64th staging of the Dublin Senior Hurling Championship since its establishment by the Dublin County Board in 1887.

Faughs entered the championship as the defending champions.

The final was played on 24 June 1951 at Croke Park in Dublin, between Eoghan Ruadh and St Vincent's, in what was their first ever meeting in the final. Eoghan Ruadh won the match by 6–06 to 2–08 to claim their first ever championship title.

== Results ==
=== Final ===
24 June 1951 Final	Eoghan Ruadh	6-06 - 2-08	St Vincent's	Croke Park
