= 1996 Dublin Senior Hurling Championship =

Annual hurling competition season

- Champions: O'Tooles (6th title)
- Runners-up: Kilmacud Crokes

The 1996 Dublin Senior Hurling Championship was the 109th staging of the Dublin Senior Hurling Championship since its establishment by the Dublin County Board in 1887.

O'Tooles entered the championship as the defending champions.

The final was played on 20 July 1996 at Parnell Park in Donnycarney, between O'Tooles and Kilmacud Crokes, in what was their third meeting in the final overall. O'Tooles won the match by 2–12 to 2–10 to claim their sixth championship title overall and a second consecutive title.

== Results ==
=== Final ===
20 July 1996 Final	O'Tooles	2-12 - 2-10	Kilmacud Crokes	Parnell Park
