= 1895 Dublin Senior Hurling Championship =

Annual hurling competition season

- Champions: Commercials (1st title)
- Runners-up: Celtics

The 1895 Dublin Senior Hurling Championship was the ninth staging of the Dublin Senior Hurling Championship since its establishment by the Dublin County Board in 1887.

Rapparees entered the championship as the defending champions.

The final was played on 8 September 1895 at Jones' Road in Dublin, between Commercials and Celtics, in what was their first ever meeting in the final. Commercials won the match by 1–10 to 1–02 to claim their first ever championship title.

== Results ==
=== Final ===
8 September 1895 Final	Commercials	1-10 - 1-02	Celtics	Jones' Road
