= 1898 Dublin Senior Hurling Championship =

Annual hurling competition season

- Champions: Commercials (4th title)

The 1898 Dublin Senior Hurling Championship was the 12th staging of the Dublin Senior Hurling Championship since its establishment by the Dublin County Board in 1887.

Commercials entered the championship as the defending champions.

Commercials won their fourth consecutive championship title.
