= 1897 Dublin Senior Hurling Championship =

Annual hurling competition season

- Champions: Commercials (3rd title)
- Runners-up: Grocers

The 1897 Dublin Senior Hurling Championship was the 11th staging of the Dublin Senior Hurling Championship since its establishment by the Dublin County Board in 1887.

Commercials entered the championship as the defending champions.

The final was played on 5 December 1897 at Jones's Road in Dublin, between Commercials and Grocers, in what was their first ever meeting in the final. Commercials won the match by 5–05 to 2–00 to claim their third consecutive championship title.

== Results ==
=== Final ===
5 December 1897 Final	Commercials	5-05 - 2-00	Grocers	Jones's Road
