= 1989 Dublin Senior Hurling Championship =

Annual hurling competition season

- Champions: Cuala (1st title); Mick Holden (captain)
- Runners-up: St Vincent's; Vincent Conroy (captain)

The 1989 Dublin Senior Hurling Championship was the 102nd staging of the Dublin Senior Hurling Championship since its establishment by the Dublin County Board in 1887.

St Vincent's entered the championship as the defending champions.

The final was played on 10 September 1989 at Parnell Park in Donnycarney, between Cuala and St Vincent's, in what was their first ever meeting in the final. Cuala won the match by 2–08 to 1–05 to claim their first ever championship title.

== Results ==
=== Final ===
10 September 1989 Final	Cuala	2-08 - 1-05	St Vincent's	Parnell Park
