= 1941 Dublin Senior Hurling Championship =

Annual hurling competition season

- Champions: Faughs (19th title)
- Runners-up: Eoghan Ruadh

The 1941 Dublin Senior Hurling Championship was the 54th staging of the Dublin Senior Hurling Championship since its establishment by the Dublin County Board in 1887.

Faughs entered the championship as the defending champions.

The final was played on 8 June 1941 at Croke Park in Dublin, between Faughs and Eoghan Ruadh, in what was their third consecutive meeting in the final. Faughs won the match by 2–09 to 2–06 to claim their 19th championship title overall and a third consecutive title.

== Results ==
=== Final ===
8 June 1941 Final	Faughs	2-09 - 2-06	Eoghan Ruadh	Croke Park
