= 1906 Dublin Senior Hurling Championship =

Annual hurling competition season

- Champions: Faughs (6th title); D McCormack (captain)
- Runners-up: Commercials; P Hayes (captain)

The 1906 Dublin Senior Hurling Championship was the 19th staging of the Dublin Senior Hurling Championship since its establishment by the Dublin County Board in 1887.

Commercials entered the championship as the defending champions.

The final, which went to two replays, was played on 1 September 1907 at Jones's Road in Dublin, between Faughs and Commercials, in what was their fourth meeting in the final overall. Faughs won the match by 4–01 to 4–00 to claim their eighth championship title overall and a second consecutive title.

== Results ==
=== Final ===
12 May 1907 Final	Faughs	5-04 - 5-04	Commercials	Jones's Road

=== Final replay ===
2 June 1907 Final replay	Faughs	2-03 - 0-09	Commercials	Jones's Road

=== Final second replay ===
1 September 1907 Final	Faughs	1-11 - 2-07	Commercials	Jones's Road
