= 2012 Dublin Senior Hurling Championship =

Annual hurling competition season

Tournament details
- County: Dublin
- Year: 2012

Winners
- Champions: Kilmacud Crokes (5th win)
- Manager: Gearóid Ó Riain

Promotion/Relegation
- Relegated team(s): N/A

The 2012 Dublin Senior Hurling Championship was a Dublin-based GAA club competition between the top clubs in Dublin Hurling. Kilmacud Crokes won the senior hurling final by beating Cuala by 2–10 to 0-09.

== Round robin ==
=== Group A ===
| Table | P | W | D | L | F | A | +/- | Pts |
|---|---|---|---|---|---|---|---|---|
| Kilmacud Crokes | 3 | 3 | 0 | 0 | +67 | -31 | +36 | 6 |
| Craobh Chiaráin | 3 | 2 | 0 | 1 | +49 | -46 | +3 | 4 |
| St. Patrick's, Palmerstown | 3 | 1 | 0 | 2 | +44 | -52 | -8 | 2 |
| Ballinteer, St. John's | 3 | 0 | 0 | 3 | +36 | -67 | -31 | 0 |

| Round 1 | Craobh Chiaráin | 2-17 - 2-08 | Ballinteer St. John's | O'Toole Park; Referee: E Mullarkey (Lucan Sarsfields). |
| Round 1 | A McCrabbe 0-10 (0-6f, 0-1sline), R Mahon 0-4, D Keane, K Ryan 1-0 each, F Usanga 0-1. | Report | A Clabby 2-0 (1-0f), O Power (0-3f), G Whelan 0-3 each, James Gilligan 0-2. | O'Toole Park; Referee: E Mullarkey (Lucan Sarsfields). |

| Round 1 | St. Patrick's, Palmerstown | 2-09 - 2-12 | Kilmacud Crokes | O'Toole Park; Referee: J Brennan (Thomas Davis). |
| Round 1 | D O’Hanlon 2-0, S Stapleton 0-4 (0-3f), A Glennon 0-2, L Rushe, D Rushe, C Dolan 0-1 each. | Report | D Kelly 1-2, S McGrath 1-0, R O’Dwyer, K O’Loughlin (2f, 1sline) 0-3 each, Ross O’Carroll, B O’Rorke, J Sweeney, C Clinton 0-1 each. | O'Toole Park; Referee: J Brennan (Thomas Davis). |

| Round 2 | St. Patrick's, Palmerstown | 2-12 - 1-12 | Ballinteer St. John's | O'Toole Park; Referee: B O’Shea (St Mark’s). |
| Round 2 | S Stapleton 1-6 (0-3f, 0-1 ‘65’), L Rushe 1-1 (1-0f), D O’Hanlon 0-2, B O’Hanlon, A Glennon, P Keaney 0-1 each. | Report | O Power 0-5 (0-4f, 0-1 ‘65’), G Whelan 1-1, A Clabby 0-3, G Ó Broin, C Lane, James Gilligan 0-1 each. | O'Toole Park; Referee: B O’Shea (St Mark’s). |

| Round 2 | Kilmacud Crokes | 3-11 - 0-08 | Craobh Chiaráin | O'Toole Park; Referee: D Ryan (St Pat’s, Palmerstown). |
| Round 2 | R O’Dwyer 2-1; Ross O’Carroll 0-5; C Clinton 1-1; K O’Loughlin 0-2 (1f); N Ó Riordáin, S McGrath 0-1 each. | Report | Derek O’Reilly 0-3 (2 ‘65’, 1f); K Ryan (1f), G Ennis 0-2; E Conroy, S McDonnell 0-1 each. | O'Toole Park; Referee: D Ryan (St Pat’s, Palmerstown). |

| Kilmacud Crokes | 4-17 - 0-08 | Ballinteer St. John's | Man of the Match: E Mac Suibhne (St Jude’s). |
| K O’Loughlin 2-7 (2-4f); B O’Rorke 1-4; J Doughan 1-0; C Clinton 0-2; D Mulligan, R O’Dwyer, S McGrath, R Walsh 0-1 each. | Report | A Clabby 0-7 (6f), O Power 0-1 (f). | Man of the Match: E Mac Suibhne (St Jude’s). |

| Craobh Chiaráin | 2-14 - 1-09 | St. Pat's, Palmerstown | O'Toole Park; Referee: E Mullarkey (Lucan Sarsfields). |
| A McCrabbe 1-10 (1-0 pen, 0-7f, 0-1 ‘65’, 0-1 sideline), P O’Boyle 1-0, G Ennis 0-2, R Mahon, F Usanga 0-1 each. | Report | G Dunne, L Dunne 0-3 each, N Sweeney 1-0, P Keaney, S Stapleton (f), A Glennon 0-1 each. | O'Toole Park; Referee: E Mullarkey (Lucan Sarsfields). |

=== Group B ===
| Table | P | W | D | L | F | A | +/- | Pts |
|---|---|---|---|---|---|---|---|---|
| St. Brigid's | 0 | 0 | 0 | 0 | 0 | 0 | 0 | 0 |
| St. Jude's | 0 | 0 | 0 | 0 | 0 | 0 | 0 | 0 |
| Crumlin | 0 | 0 | 0 | 0 | 0 | 0 | 0 | 0 |

| Round 1 | St. Jude's | 1-10 1-09 | St. Brigid's | O'Toole Park; Referee: P Faughnan (St Pat’s, Palmerstown). |
| Round 1 | J Kennedy 1-1, S Larkin 0-4 (0-3f, 0-1 ‘65’), S Lehane 0-3, J McManus 0-2. | Report | D Plunkett 1-3, P McAvinue 0-3 (0-2 ‘65’), J O’Loughlin 0-2, A McEnerney 0-1. | O'Toole Park; Referee: P Faughnan (St Pat’s, Palmerstown). |

| St. Brigid's | 1-15 - 2-10 | Crumlin | Parnell Park; Referee: D O’Donovan (St Mark’s). |
| K Kellett 1-3, P McAvinue 0-5 (0-4f), D Plunkett, P Rohan 0-2, D Doyle, D Smyth, A McEnerney 0-1 each. | Report | W O’Brien 0-7 (0-5f), S Martin, S Ryan 1-0, R Elliott, P Elliott 0-1 each. | Parnell Park; Referee: D O’Donovan (St Mark’s). |

| Round 3 | Crumlin | 3-19 - 1-15 | St. Jude's | Kiltipper Road; Referee: G Delaney (Faughs). |
| Round 3 | W O’Brien 0-8 (0-6f, 0-1 ‘65’), S Ryan, A McGreal 1-2 each, R Elliott 1-1, C Murphy 0-2, C Hennebry, S Stafford, S Martin, J Maher 0-1 each. | Report | S Larkin 0-7 (0-5f), J Kennedy 1-0, D Sutcliffe, S Lehane 0-2 each, G Nolan, F Feore, C Mangan, C McMahon 0-1 each. | Kiltipper Road; Referee: G Delaney (Faughs). |

=== Group C ===
| Table | P | W | D | L | F | A | +/- | Pts |
|---|---|---|---|---|---|---|---|---|
| Cuala | 3 | 2 | 0 | 1 | +57 | +57 | 0 | 4 |
| Lucan Sarsfields | 3 | 2 | 0 | 1 | +49 | -49 | 0 | 4 |
| St. Vincent's | 3 | 1 | 0 | 2 | +53 | -50 | +3 | 2 |
| Ballyboden St. Enda's | 3 | 1 | 0 | 2 | +45 | -48 | 0 | -3 |

| Round 1 | St. Vincent's | 0-10 - 0-15 | Ballyboden St. Enda's | O'Toole Park; Referee: P Behan (Trinity Gaels). |
| Round 1 | T Connolly 0-5 (0-3 ‘65’, 0-2f), J Hetherton, C McBride 0-2, E Dromgoole 0-1. | Report | P Ryan 0-8 (0-6f, 0-1 ’65’), E Carroll 0-3, S Lambert 0-2 (0-1 sline), N McMorrow, S O’Connor 0-1 each. | O'Toole Park; Referee: P Behan (Trinity Gaels). |

| Round 1 | Lucan Sarsfields | 1-09 - 1-18 | Cuala | Parnell Park; Referee: T Lambe (St Vincent’s). |
| Round 1 | A Whyte 1-1 (1-1f); T Lee, K O’Reilly (2f) 0-2 each; A Roche, J McCaffrey, T Somers (f), C Crummey 0-1 each. | Report | B Connolly (0-3f), D Keating 0-4 each; C Waldron, D Treacy 0-3 each; D Cunningham 1-0; C Gough 0-2; S Moran, C O’Farrell 0-1 each. | Parnell Park; Referee: T Lambe (St Vincent’s). |

| Round 2 | St. Vincent's | 3-18 - 2-08 | Cuala | Parnell Park; Referee: J Brennan (Thomas Davis). |
| Round 2 | D Connolly 1-5, J Hetherton 1-3, C McBride, T Connolly (1f, 1 ‘65’) 0-4 each, E Dromgoole 1-0, T McGrane 0-2. | Report | B Connolly 1-7 (0-6f), M Schutte 1-0, S Moran 0-1. | Parnell Park; Referee: J Brennan (Thomas Davis). |

| Round 2 | Lucan Sarsfields | 0-16 - 2-06 | Ballyboden St. Enda's | Parnell Park; Referee: P Faughnan (St Pat’s (P)). |
| Round 2 | M May, A Whyte (2f, 1 ‘65’) 0-4 each; C Crummey 0-3; K O’Reilly 0-2 (1f); J McCaffrey, A Roche, T Lee 0-1 each. | Report | P Ryan, N McMorrow 1-1 each; S Lambert 0-2; C Keaney, S O’Connor 0-1 each. | Parnell Park; Referee: P Faughnan (St Pat’s (P)). |

| Round 3 | Cuala | 1-19 - 3-09 | Ballyboden St. Enda's | Parnell Park; Referee: F McGreevy (St Oliver Plunkett’s/ER). |
| Round 3 | B Connolly 1-9 (0-8f); M Schutte 0-5; D Treacy, C Waldron 0-2 each; S Barron 0-1. | Report | P Ryan 1-3 (1-3f); S Lambert 1-1; C Keaney 1-0; N McMorrow 0-2; C McCormack, S Nagle, S Durkin 0-1 each. | Parnell Park; Referee: F McGreevy (St Oliver Plunkett’s/ER). |

| Round 3 | Lucan Sarsfields | 2-15 - 1-13 | St. Vincent's | Parnell Park; Referee: G McGrath (Setanta). |
| Round 3 | K O’Reilly 1-5 (0-3f, 0-1 sline); A Whyte 1-2 (1-0f, 0-1 ‘65’); M May, T Lee 0-2 each; C Crummey, J McCaffrey, S McClelland, A Roche 0-1 each. | Report | J Hetherton 0-4 (1f); K Connolly 1-0; T Connolly (2f), C McBride 0-3 each; D Connolly 0-2; T McGrane 0-1. | Parnell Park; Referee: G McGrath (Setanta). |

=== Group D ===
| Table | P | W | D | L | F | A | +/- | Pts |
|---|---|---|---|---|---|---|---|---|
| O'Tooles | 0 | 0 | 0 | 0 | 0 | 0 | 0 | 0 |
| Naomh Fionnbarra | 0 | 0 | 0 | 0 | 0 | 0 | 0 | 0 |
| Na Fianna | 0 | 0 | 0 | 0 | 0 | 0 | 0 | 0 |
| Faughs | 0 | 0 | 0 | 0 | 0 | 0 | 0 | 0 |

| Round 1 | O'Toole's | 3-18 - 3-08 | Naomh Fionnbarra | Parnell Park; Referee: D O’Donovan (St Mark’s). |
| Round 1 | P Carton 0-5, C Gettings, S Leonard, G Morris 1-1 each; A Morris 0-4, M Carton 0-3 (0-2f, 0-1 65), A King 0-2, C Carton 0-1. | Report | G O’Reilly 2-0, E Dillon 0-4, J Bailey 1-0, S Costello 0-2 (0-2f), P Turner, C Turner 0-1 each. | Parnell Park; Referee: D O’Donovan (St Mark’s). |

| Round 1 | Na Fianna | 2-11 - 1-10 | Faughs | Parnell Park; Referee: E MacSuibhne (St Jude’s). |
| Round 1 | M Brennan 1-6 (0-6f), T Brady 1-1, F Breathnach 0-3, A Keogh 0-1. | Report | F Heavey 1-6 (0-4f), T Kearns 0-4 (0-3f). | Parnell Park; Referee: E MacSuibhne (St Jude’s). |

| Na Fianna | 0-14 - 2-05 | Faughs | Parnell Park; Referee: P Behan (Trinity Gaels). |
| F Breathnach 0-6, P Ó Laoire 0-3 (0-1f), E Ó Casaide 0-2, M Brennan, K Murphy, A Keogh 0-1 each. | Report | E Dillon 2-3 (2-1f), G Dodrill (0-1f), K Turner 0-1 each. | Parnell Park; Referee: P Behan (Trinity Gaels). |

| O'Toole's | 1-14 - 0-12 | Faughs | O'Toole Park; Referee: D Conway (Ballyboden St Enda’s). |
| M Carton 0-7 (0-7f), G Morris 1-1, K Horgan 0-2, J Bastow, G O’Meara, P Brennan, L Ryan 0-1 each. | Report | F Heavey 0-6 (0-3f), E Mc Kenna 0-3 (0-2 ‘65’, 0-1f), H O’Leary, C Brennan, B Dillon 0-1 each. | O'Toole Park; Referee: D Conway (Ballyboden St Enda’s). |

| Round 3 | O'Toole's | 2-15 - 1-08 | Na Fianna | Parnell Park; Referee: P Behan (Trinity Gaels). |
| Round 3 | K Ryan 0-7 (0-7f), P Carton 1-0, P Brennan 1-0, A Morris 0-3. P McLoughlin 0-2, C Mulligan, C Carton, P Bradshaw 0-1 each. | Report | A Keogh 1-1, E Cassidy, J Boland 0-2 each, D O Maoleidigh, J Sharpson, K Murphy, 0-1 each. | Parnell Park; Referee: P Behan (Trinity Gaels). |

| Faughs | 1-10 - 0-10 | Naomh Fionnbarra | O'Toole Park; Referee: M O’Flaherty (St Mark’s). |
| B Dillon 1-3, T Kearns 0-5 (0-2f, 0-1 ‘65’), C Brennan, E McKenna (0-1 ‘65’) 0-1 each. | Report | E Dillon 0-4 (0-1f), G Dodrill, P Turner, K Turner, N Paget (0-1f), S Costello (0-1f), T Lynch 0-1 each. | O'Toole Park; Referee: M O’Flaherty (St Mark’s). |

== Knockout stages ==
| September 19, 2012; Quarter Final Playoff | St. Brigid's | 1-10 - 0-11 | St. Jude's | Parnell Park; Referee: D Harrington (St Sylvester’s). |
| September 19, 2012; Quarter Final Playoff | P McAvinue 0-5 (0-5f), J O’Loughlin 0-3, A McEnerney 1-0, K Kellett 0-2. | | S Larkin 0-5 (0-3 sideline, 0-2f), N Mangan 0-3 (0-2f), C Mangan, R Joyce, D Sutcliffe 0-1 each. | Parnell Park; Referee: D Harrington (St Sylvester’s). |

| September 21, 2012; Quarter Final | Crumlin | 2-16 - 0-18 | Na Fianna | Parnell Park; Referee: P Carr (Round Tower, Clondalkin). |
| September 21, 2012; Quarter Final | W O’Brien 0-7 (0-5f), S Martin 1-1, D Donnelly 1-2, A McGreal 0-3, K Byrne (0-1 pen), P Elliott, D Whelan 0-1 each. | Report | M Brennan 0-8 (0-7f), J Boland 0-5 (0-1f), T Brady, D Ó Maoléidigh 0-2 each, D Forde 0-1. | Parnell Park; Referee: P Carr (Round Tower, Clondalkin). |

| September 23, 2012; Quarter Final | Kilmacud Crokes | 2-13 - 2-08 | St. Brigid's | O’Toole Park; Referee: J Brennan (Thomas Davis) |
| September 23, 2012; Quarter Final | S McGrath 1-5 (0-5f), R O’Dwyer 1-1, Ross O’Carroll 0-3, B O’Rorke 0-2, R O’Loughlin, K O’Loughlin 0-1 each. | Report | P McAvinue 0-7 (6f), K Kellett, A McEnerney 1-0 each, D Smith 0-1. | O’Toole Park; Referee: J Brennan (Thomas Davis) |

| September 22, 2012; Quarter Final | Cuala | 2-13 - 1-12 | Craobh Chiaráin | O’Toole Park; Referee: D O’Donovan (St Mark’s). |
| September 22, 2012; Quarter Final | D Treacy 1-3, B Connolly 0-5 (0-2f), M Schutte 1-1, C Waldron 0-2, B Fitzgerald, C Gough 0-1 each. | Report | A McCrabbe 0-7 (0-6f,0- 1 ‘65’), D Keane 1-1, G Ennis 0-3, P O’Boyle 0-1. | O’Toole Park; Referee: D O’Donovan (St Mark’s). |

| September 22, 2012; Quarter Final | Lucan Sarsfields | 1-16 - 1-07 | O'Toole's | O’Toole Park; Referee: G McGrath (Setanta). |
| September 22, 2012; Quarter Final | K O’Reilly 1-8 (1-0 pen, 0-6f), T Lee, M May 0–2, C Crummy, J McCaffrey, A Roche, A Whyte 0-1 each. | Report | M Carton 0-4 (0-1f,0- 1 ‘65’), P Carton 1-0, P Brennan, L Ryan, G O’Meara 0-1 each. | O’Toole Park; Referee: G McGrath (Setanta). |

| September 29, 2012; Semi Final | Cuala | 2-19 - 2-12 | Crumlin | Parnell Park; Referee: T Lambe (St Vincent’s). |
| September 29, 2012; Semi Final | B Connolly 0-15 (0-9f), D Treacy 1-1, C Waldron 1-0, S Moran, S Barron, M Schutte 0-1 each. | Report | A McGreal 2-2, W O’Brien 0-6 (0-4f), S Ryan 0-2, K Byrne, D Donnelly 0-1 each. | Parnell Park; Referee: T Lambe (St Vincent’s). |

| September 29, 2012; Semi Final | Kilmacud Crokes | 2-11 - 0-07 | Lucan Sarsfields | Parnell Park; Referee: F McGreevy (St Oliver Plunkett’s/ER). |
| September 29, 2012; Semi Final | J Sweeney 2-0, S McGrath 0-5 (0-1f, 0-1 ‘65’), K O’Loughlin 0-3 (0-1 sideline), R O’Dwyer, Ross O’Carroll, B O’Rorke 0-1 each. | Report | K O’Reilly 0-4 (0-4f), T Somers, C Crummey, M May 0-1each. | Parnell Park; Referee: F McGreevy (St Oliver Plunkett’s/ER). |

| October 14, 2012; Final | Kilmacud Crokes | 2-10 - 0-09 | Cuala | Parnell Park; Attendance: 4,000; Referee: P Behan (Trinity Gaels). |
| October 14, 2012; Final | S MGrath 0-3 (0-1f), B O’Rorke, R O’Dwyer 1-0 each, Ross O’Carroll, K O’Loughlin (0-2f) 0-2 each, J Doughan, D Kelly, D Mulligan 0-1 each. | Report | B Connolly 0-5 (0-2f, 0-1 ‘65’), C Waldron 0-2, D Treacy, S Moran 0-1 each. | Parnell Park; Attendance: 4,000; Referee: P Behan (Trinity Gaels). |
