= Jim Cleary (hurler) =

Irish hurler

Personal information
- Native name: Séamus Ó Cléirigh (Irish)
- Born: 28 September 1889 Nenagh, County Tipperary, Ireland
- Died: 5 November 1937 (aged 48) Baggot Street, Dublin, Ireland
- Occupation: Publican

Sport
- Sport: Hurling
- Position: Left wing-forward
Club
- Years: Club
- Faughs
Club titles
- Dublin titles: 8
Inter-county
- Years: County
- Dublin
Inter-county titles
- Leinster titles: 4
- All-Irelands: 2

James Cleary (28 September 1889 – 5 November 1937) was an Irish hurler. His career included two All-Ireland Championship victories with the Dublin senior hurling team.

== Playing career ==
After moving to Dublin at an early age, Cleary joined the Faughs club in Templeogue. He won eight Dublin County Championships with the club between 1910 and 1923. Cleary's success at club level saw him drafted onto the Dublin senior hurling team. He won his first All-Ireland Championship title in the 1917 All-Ireland Senior Hurling Championship, before claiming a second winners' medal in the 1920 Championship. Cleary also won four Leinster Senior Hurling Championship titles in a five-year period between 1917 and 1921.

== Personal life and death ==
Cleary was born just outside Nenagh, County Tipperary—the youngest of nine children of Cornelius and Annie (née Martin). He spent a brief time in education and then worked in Dublin, first as a grocer's assistant and later as a publican. He married Johanna Connolly from Thurles in April 1926 and had two children.

On 5 November 1937, Cleary died aged 48 after suffering a stroke.

== Honours ==
Faughs

- Dublin Senior Hurling Championship (8): 1910, 1911, 1914, 1915, 1920, 1921, 1922, 1923

Dublin

- All-Ireland Senior Hurling Championship (2): 1917, 1920
- Leinster Senior Hurling Championship (4): 1917, 1919, 1920, 1921
