= 2013 Dublin Senior Hurling Championship =

Annual hurling competition season

The 2013 Dublin Senior Hurling Championship is the 124th staging of the Dublin Senior Hurling Championship since its establishment in 1887. The championship is scheduled to end on 10 November 2013.

Kilmacud Crokes were the defending champions, however, they were defeated in the quarter-final stage. Lucan Sarsfields and Ballyboden St. Enda's contested the final, with Ballyboden winning the game.

== Results ==
=== Quarter-finals ===
12 October Quarter-final	Craobh Chiaráin	2-9 - 1-10	Ballinteer St. John's	O'Toole Park

12 October Quarter-final	St. Brigid's	1-20 - 1-17	St. Patrick's	O'Toole Park

13 October Quarter-final	Lucan Sarsfields	0-25 - 1-17	Crumlin	O'Toole Park
	T Somers 0-8 (6f, 1 ‘65’); A Roche 0-6; K O’Reilly 0-4; J McCaffrey 0-3; P Ward 0-2; B Aird, K Fitzgerald 0-1 each.	Report	A McGreal 1-8 (0-4f, 0-1 ‘65’); S Martin 0-3; K Byrne 0-2; W O’Brien, S Ryan, C Gough, L Coleman 0-1 each.	Referee: D Harrington

13 October Quarter-final	Ballyboden St. Enda's	3-14 - 2-13	Kilmacud Crokes	O'Toole Park
	P Ryan 2-6 (1-2f, 0-2 ‘65’); C Keaney 1-1; C McCormack 0-3; M Nagle 0-2; N McMorrow, G Corrigan 0-1 each.	Report	S McGrath 0-7 (7f); Ross O’Carroll 1-1; Rory O’Carroll 1-0; J Sweeney 0-2; O Ó Ruairc, C Mac Gabhann, D Mulligan 0-1 each.	Referee: D Harrington

=== Semi-finals ===
24 October Semi-final	Ballyboden St. Enda's	2-17 - 1-9	St. Brigid's	Parnell Park
	P Ryan (0-7, 5f), S Durkin (1-1), M Nagle (1-0), C Keaney (0-3), N McMorrow (0-2), G Corrigan (0-2), S O'Connor (0-1), S Hiney (0-1).		J O'Loughlin (1-0), P Winters (0-3, 2f), P McAvinue (0-2), A Nolan (0-1f), P Rohan (0-1), R Dunbar (0-1), D Doyle (0-1).	Referee: P Behan

24 October Semi-final	Lucan Sarsfields	1-13 - 1-9	Craobh Chiaráin	Parnell Park
	A Roche (0-4), P Ward (1-0), T Somers (0-3f), K O'Reilly (0-3, 2f), C Crummey (0-2), J McCaffrey (0-1).		R Mahon (1-2), A McCrabbe (0-5, 3f), M McGuirk (0-1), K Elliott (0-1).	Referee: G McGrath

=== Final ===
10 November Final	Lucan Sarsfields	1-09 - 1-13	Ballyboden St. Enda's	Parnell Park
				Attendance: <5000
