= 1998 Dublin Senior Hurling Championship =

Annual hurling competition season

- Sponsor: Evening Herald
- Champions: Craobh Chiaráin (2nd title)
- Runners-up: Crumlin

The 1998 Dublin Senior Hurling Championship was the 111th staging of the Dublin Senior Hurling Championship since its establishment by the Dublin County Board in 1887.

O'Tooles entered the championship as the defending champions.

The final was played on 24 October 1998 at Parnell Park in Donnycarney, between Craobh Chiaráin and Crumlin, in what was their first ever meeting in the final. Craobh Chiaráin won the match by 2–11 to 1–06 to claim their second championship title overall and a first title in 27 years.

== Results ==
=== Final ===
24 October 1998 Final	Craobh Chiaráin	2-11 - 1-06	Crumlin	Parnell Park
