= 1894 Dublin Senior Hurling Championship =

Annual hurling competition season

- Champions: Rapparees (1st title)

The 1894 Dublin Senior Hurling Championship was the eighth staging of the Dublin Senior Hurling Championship since its establishment by the Dublin County Board.

Davitts entered the championship as the defending chammpions.

On 5 August 1894, Rapparees were awarded the title. It was their second championship title overall and a first title in three years.
