= 1991 Dublin Senior Hurling Championship =

Annual hurling competition season

- Champions: Cuala (2nd title)
- Runners-up: Craobh Chiaráin

The 1991 Dublin Senior Hurling Championship was the 104th staging of the Dublin Senior Hurling Championship since its establishment by the Dublin County Board in 1887.

O'Tooles entered the championship as the defending champions.

The final, a replay, was played on 27 October 1991 at Parnell Park in Donnycarney, between Cuala and Craobh Chiaráin, in what was their first ever meeting in the final. Cuala won the match by 4–06 to 1–07 to claim their second championship title overall and a first title in two years.

== Results ==
=== Final ===
19 October 1991 Final	Cuala	0-08 - 0-08	Craobh Chiaráin	Parnell Park

=== Final replay ===
27 October 1991 Final replay	Cuala	4-06 - 1-07	Craobh Chiaráin	Parnell Park
