= 1961 Dublin Senior Hurling Championship =

Annual hurling competition season

- Champions: University College Dublin (4th title)
- Runners-up: St Vincent's

The 1961 Dublin Senior Hurling Championship was the 74th staging of the Dublin Senior Hurling Championship since its establishment by the Dublin County Board in 1887.

St Vincent's entered the championship as the defending champions.

The final was played on 11 June 1961 at Croke Park in Dublin, between University College Dublin and St Vincent's, in what was their first ever meeting in the final. University College Dublin won the match by 3–09 to 1–09 to claim their fourth championship title overall and a first title in 13 years.

== Results ==
=== Final ===
11 June 1961 Final	University College Dublin	3-09 - 1-09	St Vincent's	Croke Park
