= 1911 Dublin Senior Hurling Championship =

Annual hurling competition season

- Champions: Faughs (8th title)
- Runners-up: Commercials

The 1911 Dublin Senior Hurling Championship was the 24th staging of the Dublin Senior Hurling Championship since its establishment by the Dublin County Board in 1887.

Faughs entered the championship as the defending champions.

The final was played on 14 May 1911 at Jones's Road in Dublin, between Faughs and Commercials, in what was their fourth meeting in the final overall. Faughs won the match by 4–01 to 4–00 to claim their eighth championship title overall and a second consecutive title.

== Results ==
=== Final ===
14 May 1911 Final	Faughs	4-01 - 4-00	Commercials	Jones's Road
