= 2011 Dublin Senior Hurling Championship =

Annual hurling competition season

Tournament details
- County: Dublin
- Year: 2011

Winners
- Champions: Ballyboden St. Enda's (5th win)
- Manager: Liam Hogan

The 2011 Dublin Senior Hurling Championship is a Dublin-based GAA club competition between the top clubs in Dublin Hurling.

== Round robin ==
=== Group A ===
Table	P	W	D	L	F	A	+/-	Pts
St Vincents	1	1	0	0	19	15	4	2
Kilmacud Crokes	1	1	0	0	14	13	1	2
Ballinteer St Johns	0	0	0	0	0-00	0-00	0	0
Craobh Chiaráin	0	0	0	0	0-00	0-00	0	0
Faughs	1	0	1	0	13	14	-1	0
St Brigids	1	0	1	0	15	19	-4	0

11 May 2011	Faughs	1-10 - 0-14	Kilmacud Crokes	Tymon North; Referee: G McGrath (Setanta).
11 May 2011	M Ryan 0-9 (0-9f), C Brennan 1-0; J Kelly 0-1.	Report	S McGrath 0-5 (0-4f), K O’Loughlin 0-4 (0-3f), J Burke, J Doughan, R O’Dwyer, B O’Rorke, J Sweeney 0-1 each.	Tymon North; Referee: G McGrath (Setanta).

11 May 2011	St Brigids	0-15 - 2-13	St Vincents	Russell Park; Referee: M Butler (Kilmacud Crokes).
11 May 2011	D Plunkett 0-7 (0-6f), A McEnerney 0-3 (0-3f), A Nolan (0-1 pen), M Cussen, J Winters, C Morris, K Fox 0-1 each.	Report	T Connolly 0-6 (0-5f), T McGrane 1-1, C McBride 0-3, K Connolly 1-0, D Connolly 0-2, M Chalke 0-1.	Russell Park; Referee: M Butler (Kilmacud Crokes).

TBC	Ballinteer St Johns	v	Craobh Chiaráin	Marley Park

13 August 2011	Kilmacud Crokes	v	Ballinteer St Johns

13 August 2011	St Vincents	v	Faughs

13 August 2011	Craobh Chiaráin	v	St Brigids

=== Group B ===
Table	P	W	D	L	F	A	+/-	Pts
Ballyboden St Endas	1	1	0	0	23	14	9	2
Lucan Sarsfields	1	1	0	0	20	12	8	2
O'Tooles	1	1	0	0	18	11	7	2
St Judes	1	0	1	0	11	18	-7	0
Na Fianna	1	0	1	0	12	20	-8	0
Cuala	1	0	1	0	14	23	-8	0

11 May 2011	Ballyboden St Endas	1-20 - 0-14	Cuala	Páirc Uí Mhurchú; Referee: JC Ryan (St Mark’s).
11 May 2011	P Ryan 0-9 (0-8f, 0-1 ‘65’); C McCormack 1-4; D Curtin (0-1f), C Keaney 0-2 each; S Durkin, M Travers, C Moffatt 0-1 each.	Report	D Treacy 0-6 (0-4f, 0-1 ‘65’); C Waldron 0-2; S Kiely, S Stapleton, P Schutte, C Sheanon, D Cunningham, J Sheanon 0-1 each.	Páirc Uí Mhurchú; Referee: JC Ryan (St Mark’s).

11 May 2011	Lucan Sarsfields	3-11 - 0-11	Na Fianna	12th Lock; Referee: T Lambe (St Vincent’s).
11 May 2011	A Whyte 1-2 (0-2f), J McCaffrey (0-1 ‘65’), A Roche 1-1 each, M May 0–3, P Kelly 0-2, D Brennan, T Somers 0-1 each.	Report	N Ó Ceallacháin 0-3 (3f), T Bergin, S Behan, D Forde 0-2 each, R Lynch (0-1f), E Cassidy 0-1 each.	12th Lock; Referee: T Lambe (St Vincent’s).

11 May 2011	O'Tooles	0-18 - 0-11	St Judes	St Annes Park; Referee: T Carton (Naomh Fionnbarra).
11 May 2011	M Carton 0-7 (0-2f), Peadar Carton 0-3, L Ryan, M Cunningham, K Flynn (0-1f) 0-2 each, G O’Meara, P Bradshaw 0-1 each.	Report	C Mangan 0-4 (0-2f), S Larkin 0-3 (0-2f), S Ryan, R Joyce, J Ryan, B Farrell 0-1 each.	St Annes Park; Referee: T Carton (Naomh Fionnbarra).

13 August 2011	Na Fianna	v	Ballyboden St Endas

13 August 2011	St Judes	v	Lucan Sarsfields

13 August 2011	Cuala	v	O'Tooles

== Revised Championship ==
Due to the success of the Dublin Senior Hurling County team, the format of the tournament was changed to suit the limited timetable leading up to the Leinster Club championship.

=== First round ===
24 September 2011; 17:45; Round 1	Cuala	0-12 - 1-15	Lucan Sarsfields	Parnell Park; Referee: M Butler (Kilmacud Crokes)
24 September 2011; 17:45; Round 1	J Sheanon 0-7 (0-6f), S Kiely 0-2 (0-1 ‘65’, 0-1f), C Waldron (0-1 sline), P Schutte, D Cunningham 0-1 each.	Report	K O’Reilly 0-10 (0-6f, 0-2 ‘65’), C Crummy 1-0, R Lambert, M May 0–2, J McCaffrey 0-1.	Parnell Park; Referee: M Butler (Kilmacud Crokes)

24 September 2011; 16:00; Round 1	St Brigids	2-15 - 2-10	Craobh Chiaráin	Parnell Park; Referee: G McGrath (Setanta).
24 September 2011; 16:00; Round 1	B McEnerney 1-2, P McAvinue 0-5 (0-4f), S Callanan 1-0, D Plunkett 0-3, J O’Loughlin, K Kellett 0-2, P Winters 0-1.	Report	A McCrabbe 0-5 (0-3f, 0-1 ‘65’), K Ryan, S Ennis 1-0, R Mahon 0-2, S McDonnell, P Purtell, P O’Boyle 0-1 each.	Parnell Park; Referee: G McGrath (Setanta).

25 September 2011; 14:15; Round 1	St Judes	0-10 - 1-12	Faughs	Parnell Park
25 September 2011; 14:15; Round 1	C Mangan 0-3 (0-3f), D Sutcliffe, S Larkin (0-1f) 0-2 each, J Ryan, J McManus, C Grogan 0-1 each.	Report	M Ryan 0-4 (0-4f), J Kelly 0-3, C McCann 1-0, B Dillon 0-2, M O’Brien, K O’Brien, C Aherne 0-1 each.	Parnell Park

25 September 2011; 16:00; Round 1	Ballinteer St Johns	2-15 - 0-08	Na Fianna	Parnell Park
25 September 2011; 16:00; Round 1	J Maher 2-10 (0-8f), A Clabby 0-2, D Gormley, James Gilligan, F Clabby 0-1 each.	Report	F Breathnach 0-2, W Lyons (0-1f), P Downes, E Cassidy, O O Maoileidigh, A Keogh, D Forde 0-1 each.	Parnell Park

=== Quarter-finals ===
7 October 2011; Quarter-final	St. Brigid's	2-14 - 2-10	St. Vincent's	Parnell Park; Referee: D O’Donovan (St Mark’s).
7 October 2011; Quarter-final	P McAvinue 1-7 (1-6f), K Kellett 1-1, J O’Loughlin 0-3, M Cussen, D Plunkett, B McEnerney 0-1 each.	Report	D Connolly 2-3, T Connolly 0-3 (3f), D Russell 0-2 (1f), J Hetherton, S O’Neill 0-1 each.	Parnell Park; Referee: D O’Donovan (St Mark’s).

7 October 2011; Quarter-final	O'Toole's	0-12 - 1-06	Kilmacud Crokes	Parnell Park; Referee: D Harrington (St Sylvester’s).
7 October 2011; Quarter-final	M Carton 0-4 (2f), Peadar Carton 0-3, A Morris 0-2 (1f), D Farrelly, L Ryan, C Carton 0-1 each.	Report	R Walsh 1-1, R O’Dwyer 0-3, K O’Loughlin 0-2 (1f).	Parnell Park; Referee: D Harrington (St Sylvester’s).

8 October; Quarter-final	Faughs	1-05 - 0-25	Lucan Sarsfields	Parnell Park
8 October; Quarter-final	F Heavey 1-1, M Ryan 0-2, J Kelly, E McKenna 0-1 each.	Report	D Brennan, K O’Reilly (0-4f) 0-6 each, R Lambert, T Somers, S McClelland (0-2f) 0-3 each, M May, J McCaffrey, P Carroll, A Roche 0-1 each.	Parnell Park

8 October 2011; Quarter-final	Ballyboden St. Enda's	2-15 - 0-09	Ballinteer St. John's	Parnell Park
8 October 2011; Quarter-final	P Ryan 0-8 (0-6f, 0-1 65), C McCormack, T Sweeney 1-0 each, D Curtin, S Lambert, E Carroll 0-2 each, M Travers 0-1.	Report	J Maher (0-1f), James Gilligan (0-2f) 0-3 each, A Clabby 0-2 (0-1f), S Lane 0-1.	Parnell Park

=== Semi-finals ===
19 October 2011; 18:45; Semi-final	O'Toole's	1-17 - 0-15	St. Brigid's	Parnell Park; Referee: G McGrath (Setanta).
19 October 2011; 18:45; Semi-final	A Morris 0-7 (6f), D Webster 1-2 (0-1f), G Morris 0-3, L Ryan 0-2, Paddy Carton, Peadar Carton, M Carton (f) 0-1 each.	Report	P McAvinue 0-7 (6f), J O’Loughlin 0-4, C Doyle, K Kellett, S Callinan, C O’Mahony 0-1 each.	Parnell Park; Referee: G McGrath (Setanta).

19 October 2011; 20:15; Semi-final	Ballyboden St. Enda's	6-10 - 1-08	Lucan Sarsfields	Parnell Park; Referee: T Carton (Naomh Fionnbarra).
19 October 2011; 20:15; Semi-final	P Ryan 2-6 (0-3f), C McCormack 2-0, D O’Connor 1-1, T Sweeney 1-0, S Lambert 0-2, N McMorrow 0-1.	Report	K O’Reilly 0-5 (3f, 1 65), C Crummy 1-0, T Lee 0-2, R Lambert 0-1.	Parnell Park; Referee: T Carton (Naomh Fionnbarra).

== Dublin Senior Club Hurling final ==
O'Toole's	0-09 - 3-12 (final score after 60 minutes)	Ballyboden St. Enda's
Manager: Morris Team: B McLoughlin; R Walker; M Cunningham; G O’Meara; P Brennan; K Ryan; J Bastow; G Morris; Peadar Carton 0-01; M Carton 0-01; A Morris 0-4 (0-2f); L Ryan 0-01; C Mulligan 0-01; D Webster; Patrick Carton. Substitutes: P O’Donoghue 0-01 for Bastow (ht); C Carton for Webster (57).	Half-time: 0-04 - 2-06 Competition: Dublin Senior Hurling Championship (Final) Date: 16.00 BST Venue: Parnell Park, Dublin Attendance: Referee: G McGrath (Setanta). Match rules: 60 minutes. Replay if scores still level. Maximum of 5 substitutions.	Manager: Liam Hogan Team: G Maguire; S Nagle; D Spain; M O’Sullivan; M Travers; S Nolan (f) 0-01; D Curran; D Curtin; S Durkin 0-01; J Doody; S Lambert 0-01; D O’Connor 0-2; E Carroll 1-2; C McCormack 1-1; P Ryan 1-3 (1-2f, 0-1 65). Substitutes: N McMorrow for Carroll (46); T Sweeney 0-01 for Doody (47); P Buckeridge for Nagle (52); S O’Connor for O’Sullivan (54); M Weldon for Ryan (55).
