= 1923 Dublin Senior Hurling Championship =

Annual hurling competition season

- Champions: Faughs (14th title)
- Runners-up: Collegians

The 1923 Dublin Senior Hurling Championship was the 36th staging of the Dublin Senior Hurling Championship since its establishment by the Dublin County Board in 1887.

Faughs entered the championship as the defending champions.

The final was played on 24 June 1923 at Croke Park in Dublin, between Faughs and Collegians, in what was their fifth meeting in the final overall. Faughs won the match by 7–09 to 1–00 to claim their 14th championship title overall and a fourth consecutive title.

== Results ==
=== Final ===
24 June 1923 Final	Faughs	7-09 - 1-00	Collegians	Croke Park
