= 1969 Dublin Senior Hurling Championship =

Annual hurling competition season

- Champions: O'Tooles (1st title)
- Runners-up: Faughs

The 1969 Dublin Senior Hurling Championship was the 82nd staging of the Dublin Senior Hurling Championship since its establishment by the Dublin County Board in 1887.

University College Dublin entered the championship as the defending champions.

The final was played on 31 August 1969 at Parnell Park in Donnycarney, between O'Tooles and Faughs, in what was their first ever meeting in the final. O'Tooles won the match by 4–08 to 2–09 to claim their first ever championship title.

== Results ==
=== Final ===
31 August 1969 Final	O'Tooles	4-08 - 2-09	Faughs	Parnell Park
