= 1987 Dublin Senior Hurling Championship =

Annual hurling competition season

- Champions: Faughs (29th title)
- Runners-up: Cuala

The 1987 Dublin Senior Hurling Championship was the 100th staging of the Dublin Senior Hurling Championship since its establishment by the Dublin County Board in 1887.

Faughs entered the championship as the defending champions.

The final was played on 31 July 1987 at Parnell Park in Donnycarney, between Faughs and Cuala, in what was their first ever meeting in the final. Faughs won the match by 1–11 to 1–07 to claim their 29th championship title overall and a second consecutive title.

== Results ==
=== Final ===
31 July 1987 Final	Faughs	1-11 - 1-07	Cuala	Croke Park
