= 1955 Dublin Senior Hurling Championship =

Annual hurling competition season

- Champions: St Vincent's (3rd title)
- Runners-up: Faughs

The 1955 Dublin Senior Hurling Championship was the 68th staging of the Dublin Senior Hurling Championship since its establishment by the Dublin County Board in 1887.

St Vincent's entered the championship as the defending champions.

The final was played on 31 July 1955 at Croke Park in Dublin, between St Vincent's and Faughs, in what was their second consecutive meeting in the final. St Vincent's won the match by 5–08 to 4–09 to claim their third consecutive championship title.

== Results ==
=== Final ===
31 July 1955 Final	St Vincent's	5-08 - 4-09	Faughs	Croke Park
