= 1908 Dublin Senior Hurling Championship =

Annual hurling competition season

- Champions: Kickhams (3rd title)
- Runners-up: Faughs

The 1908 Dublin Senior Hurling Championship was the 21st staging of the Dublin Senior Hurling Championship since its establishment by the Dublin County Board in 1887.

Commercials entered the championship as the defending champions.

The final was played on 20 July 1908 at Jones' Road in Dublin, between Kickhams and Faughs, in what was their first ever meeting in the final. Kickhams won the match by 2–06 to 2–04 to claim their third championship title overall and a first title in 18 years.

== Results ==
=== Final ===
20 July 1908 Final	Kickhams	2-06 - 2-04	Faughs	Jones' Road
