= 1929 Dublin Senior Hurling Championship =

Annual hurling competition season

- Champions: Garda (5th title)
- Runners-up: Commercials

The 1929 Dublin Senior Hurling Championship was the 42nd staging of the Dublin Senior Hurling Championship since its establishment by the Dublin County Board in 1887.

Garda entered the championship as the defending champions.

The final was played on 28 April 1929 at Croke Park in Dublin, between Garda and Commercials, in what was their first ever meeting in the final. Garda won the match by 8–05 to 2–00 to claim a record-equalling fifth consecutive championship title.

== Results ==
=== Final ===
28 April 1929 Final	Garda	8-05 - 2-00	Commercials	Croke Park
