= 1893 Dublin Senior Hurling Championship =

Annual hurling competition season

- Champions: Davitts (1st title)

The 1893 Dublin Senior Hurling Championship was the seventh staging of the Dublin Senior Hurling Championship since its establishment by the Dublin County Board.

Davitt–Faughs entered the championship as the defending chammpions.

Davitts won the final to claim their first ever championship title.
