= 1997 Dublin Senior Hurling Championship =

Annual hurling competition season

- Champions: O'Tooles (7th title)
- Runners-up: St Vincent's

The 1997 Dublin Senior Hurling Championship was the 110th staging of the Dublin Senior Hurling Championship since its establishment by the Dublin County Board in 1887.

O'Tooles entered the championship as the defending champions.

The final was played on 12 October 1997 at Parnell Park in Donnycarney, between O'Tooles and St Vincent's, in what was their fifth meeting in the final overall. O'Tooles won the match by 2–10 to 0–08 to claim their seventh championship title overall and a third consecutive title.

== Results ==
=== Final ===
| 12 October 1997 Final | O'Tooles | 2-10 - 0-08 | St Vincent's | Parnell Park |
