= 1933 Dublin Senior Hurling Championship =

Annual hurling competition season

- Champions: Army Metro (1st title)
- Runners-up: Garda

The 1933 Dublin Senior Hurling Championship was the 46th staging of the Dublin Senior Hurling Championship since its establishment by the Dublin County Board in 1887.

Young Irelands entered the championship as the defending champions.

The final was played on 111 June 1933 at Croke Park in Dublin, between Army Metro and Garda, in what was their first ever meeting in the final. Army Metro won the match by 3–06 to 3–04 to claim their first ever championship title.

== Results ==
=== Final ===
11 June 1933 Final	Army Metro	3-06 - 3-04	Garda	Croke Park
