= 1982 Dublin Senior Hurling Championship =

Annual hurling competition season

- Champions: St Vincent's (11th title)
- Runners-up: O'Tooles

The 1982 Dublin Senior Hurling Championship was the 95th staging of the Dublin Senior Hurling Championship since its establishment by the Dublin County Board in 1887.

St Vincent's entered the championship as the defending champions.

The final was played on 12 September 1982 at Parnell Park in Donnycarney, between St Vincent's and O'Tooles, in what was their second consecutive meeting in the final. St Vincent's won the match by 3–04 to 3–10 to claim their 11th championship title overall and a second consecutive title.

== Results ==
=== Final ===
12 September 1982 Final	St Vincent's	3-04 - 0-10	O'Tooles	Parnell Park
