= 1932 Dublin Senior Hurling Championship =

Annual hurling competition season

- Champions: Young Irelands (1st title)
- Runners-up: University College Dublin

The 1932 Dublin Senior Hurling Championship was the 45th staging of the Dublin Senior Hurling Championship since its establishment by the Dublin County Board in 1887.

Garda entered the championship as the defending champions.

The final was played on 1 May 1932 at Croke Park in Dublin, between Young Irelands and University College Dublin, in what was their first ever meeting in the final. Young Irelands won the match by 8–02 to 3–01 to claim their first ever championship title.

== Results ==
=== Final ===
1 May 1932 Final	Young Irelands	8-02 - 3-01	University College Dublin	Croke Park
