= 1899 Dublin Senior Hurling Championship =

Annual hurling competition season

- Champions: Commercials (5th title)
- Runners-up: Faughs

The 1899 Dublin Senior Hurling Championship was the 13th staging of the Dublin Senior Hurling Championship since its establishment by the Dublin County Board in 1887.

Commercials entered the championship as the defending champions.

The final was played on 20 August 1899 at Jones's Road in Dublin, between Commercials and Faughs, in what was their first ever meeting in the final. Commercials won the match by 6–07 to 2–05 to claim their fifth consecutive championship title.

== Results ==
=== Final ===
20 August 1899 Final	Commercials	6-07 - 2-05	Faughs	Jones's Road
