= 1974 Dublin Senior Hurling Championship =

Annual hurling competition season

- Champions: Kilmacud Crokes (1st title)
- Runners-up: Faughs

The 1974 Dublin Senior Hurling Championship was the 87th staging of the Dublin Senior Hurling Championship since its establishment by the Dublin County Board in 1887.

Faughs entered the championship as the defending champions.

The final was played on 23 March 1975 at Parnell Park in Donnycarney, between Kilmacud Crokes and Faughs, in what was their first ever meeting in the final. Kilmacud Crokes won the match by 3–13 to 4–09 to claim their first ever championship title.

== Results ==
=== Final ===
23 March 1975 Final	Kilmacud Crokes	3-13 - 4-09	Faughs	Parnell Park
