= 2019 Dublin Senior Hurling Championship =

Annual hurling competition season

- 2019 Craobh Sinsear Peile; Bhaile Átha Cliath

Tournament details
- County: Dublin
- Year: 2019

Winners
- Champions: Cuala (7th win)
- Manager: Willy Maher
- Captain: Colm Cronin

The 2019 Dublin Senior Hurling Championship was the 132nd staging of the Dublin Senior Hurling Championship since its establishment by the Dublin County Board in 1887. The championship began in April 2019.

Ballyboden St. Enda's were the defending champions, defeating Kilmacud Crokes in the 2018 final.

== Group stage ==
=== Group 1 ===
Team	Pld	W	L	D	PF	PA	PD	Pts
Na Fianna	3	2	1	0	86	46	+40	5
Kilmacud Crokes	3	2	1	0	63	39	+24	5
Faughs	3	1	0	2	53	73	-20	2
O'Toole's	3	0	0	3	42	86	-44	0

6 April 2019 Round 1	Kilmacud Crokes	1-16 (19) – (19) 1-16	Na Fianna	Parnell Park
16:00
				Referee: PJ Murray

6 April 2019 Round 1	Faughs	3-18 (27) – (21) 2-15	O'Tooles	Monastery Road
16:00
				Referee: Ciarán Reilly

== Final ==
20 October 2019 Final	Cuala	1-18 – 1-14	St Brigids	Parnell Park
16:00
	Gls: Sean Moran (0-02); Colum Sheanon (0-01); Jake Malone (0-01); Darragh O'Connell (0-01, 0-01f); David Treacy (0-12, 0-12f); Con O'Callaghan (1-00); Nicky Kenny (0-01)		Gls: Daire Plunkett (0-01); Keith Mullally (1-01); Eoghan Dunne (0-01, 0-01 s/l); Paul Winters (0-07, 0-07f); Cian O'Sullivan (0-01); Johnny McGuirk (0-02); Luke Purtill (0-01)	Referee: Thomas Gleeson (Naomh Fionnbarra)
