= 1892 Dublin Senior Hurling Championship =

Annual hurling competition season

- Champions: Davitt–Faughs (1st title)
- Runners-up: Kickhams

The 1892 Dublin Senior Hurling Championship was the sixth staging of the Dublin Senior Hurling Championship since its establishment by the Dublin County Board.

Rapparees entered the championship as the defending chammpions.

The final was played in August 1892 at Clonturk Park in Dublin, between Davitt–Faughs and Kickhams, in what was their first ever meeting in the final. Davitt–Faughs won the match to claim their first ever championship title.
