= Dublin Senior Hurling Championship =

Annual hurling competition

- Current season or competition: 2026 Dublin Senior Hurling Championship
- Irish: Craobh Shinsir Iomána Átha Cliath
- Code: Hurling
- Founded: 1887
- Region: Dublin (GAA)
- No. of teams: 12 (senior 1); 24 (total)
- Title holders: Kilmacud Crokes (8th title)
- Most titles: Faughs (31 titles)
- Sponsors: Go-Ahead
- TV partner: RTÉ/TG4
- Official website: Dublin GAA

The Dublin Senior Hurling Championship (Irish: Craobh Sinsear Iomána Átha Cliath) is an annual hurling competition organised by the Dublin County Board of the Gaelic Athletic Association (GAA) since 1887 for the top hurling clubs in County Dublin, Ireland.

Sixteen clubs compete. Initially the teams are divided into four groups of four with the group matches being played from April to May with a break to accommodate the All-Ireland Championship and resume during August or September. The group stage is followed by a knock-out phase which takes place during the months of October and November.

Sponsored by Go-Ahead, it is therefore officially known as the Go-Ahead Dublin Senior Hurling Championship.

Since the establishment of the Dublin Senior Hurling Championship in 1887, a total of 26 clubs have won the tournament. Faughs have been the most successful club having won 31 titles.

Kilmacud Crokes are the title holders having defeated Cuala 2-17 to 0-12 in the 2026 final.

== History ==
=== Origins ===
The game of hurling has been played in Dublin long since before the foundation of the Dublin Senior Hurling Championship and the GAA. According to Irish historian James Ware (1594–1666), it was customary in the 13th century for the inhabitants of Dublin to organise hurling matches on festive days. On Easter Monday 1209, hundreds of Dublin citizens left the safety of the city walls and descended on the woods near Cullenswood, now Ranelagh, for a hurling match. Tragically, the hurlers and spectators were ambushed by rival clans who had come down from the Wicklow Mountains. Over three hundred Dubliners (including women and children) were slaughtered in the 1209 Cullenswood massacre. This day was commemorated by the citizens of Dublin for many centuries afterwards and became known as Black Monday.

Other early written accounts of hurling matches in Dublin include several 18th-century newspaper reports. According to these reports, the most popular hurling venues in Dublin at that time were the Crumlin Commons, Irishtown Green and Phoenix Park. One such account recalls a match which took place on the Crumlin Commons in May 1748, where a selection of hurlers from Leinster defeated 20 hurlers from Munster. In a re-match a month later, the Leinster hurlers proved their worth by beating the Munster selection for a second time. Another report describes a hurling match which took place on Irishtown Green in 1757. The game was held between married men and bachelors for a wager of 50 guineas a side. The tradition of a 'married versus singles' hurling match is still staged by many Dublin hurling clubs on Saint Stephen's Day. In 1778, police officers dispersed a crowd on Summerhill that had assembled in the fields there every Sunday during the summer for the purpose of playing football and hurling. It is believed that this was the exact spot where Croke Park now stands. According to the Freeman's Journal, in August 1779, there was a bet between the penny boys of Smithfield, who had arranged a bull bait for the Fifteen Acres, that they would draw a bigger crowd than "the hurlers of the Phoenix Park". An account from 1792 describes a hurling match which took place in Phoenix Park in front of what was described as a vast concourse of spectators. The report claims that the game had to be abandoned before full-time because the spectators forced their way onto the playing ground.

=== Foundation ===
The game of hurling illustrated by the Dublin Metropolitan Hurling Club in 1884.

The organisation of hurling clubs in Dublin also predates the foundation of the GAA. In 1882, Michael Cusack attended the first meeting of the 'Dublin Hurling Club', formed "for the purpose of taking steps to re-establish the national game of hurling". In September 1883, Cusack began to organise hurling practices in Phoenix Park on Saturday afternoons. The game had long been lost to the city and to most of the remaining parts of the country as well. As a consequence, just four men turned up on that first Saturday. Slowly the numbers grew, with intrigued spectators joining in. Eventually, Cusack had sufficient numbers to found 'Cusack's Academy Hurling Club' which, in turn, led to the establishment of the Metropolitan Hurling Club. Cusack then established a hurling club in his school on Gardiner Place in October 1883. Immediately, the two clubs began to play matches against each other. A report, written by Cusack, records a game played in December 1883: "During the third and fourth quarters the hurling became so fast and furious, the goals were so threatened on the one hand and defended on the other, that spectators expected to be called on after each charge to help the disabled to Steevens Hospital." On Easter Monday 1884, the Metropolitans played Killimor, in Galway. The game had to be stopped on numerous occasions as the two teams were playing to different rules. It was this clash of styles that convinced Cusack that not only did the rules of the games need to be standardised, but that a body must be established to govern Irish sports.

On Saturday, 1 November 1884, the GAA was founded in Hayes' Hotel, Thurles, County Tipperary. Michael Cusack was among the founding members present that day. From then on, Gaelic games adopted a more structured approach and were governed in each county by a separate body known as the county board. The Dublin County Board was set up in 1886 and within a year had organised a hurling competition known today as the Dublin Senior Hurling Championship. In 1887, the first Dublin Senior Hurling Championship was played out and was won by the Metropolitans, previously formed by Cusack in 1883.

== Qualification for subsequent competitions ==
At the end of the championship, the winning team qualify to the subsequent Leinster Senior Club Hurling Championship.

== Format ==
=== Group stage ===
The 12 teams are divided into two groups of six. Over the course of the group stage, each team plays once against the others in the group, resulting in each team being guaranteed at least five games. Two points are awarded for a win, one for a draw and zero for a loss. The teams are ranked in the group stage table by points gained, then scoring difference and then their head-to-head record. The top four teams in each group qualify for the knock-out stage.

=== Knockout stage ===
Quarter-finals: The team coming first of group 1 faces the team coming fourth of group 2 and so on.

Semi-finals: The four quarter-final winners contest this round. The two winners from these two games advance to the final.

Final: The two semi-final winners contest the final. The winning team are declared champions and represent Dublin in the Leinster Club Hurling Championship.

=== Relegation ===
At the end of the championship, the two 5th-placed teams face the two 6th-placed teams from the group stage with the losing teams being relegated to the Dublin Senior 2 Hurling Championship.

== Teams ==
=== 2026 teams ===
24 clubs competed in the 2026 Dublin Senior Hurling Championships: 12 teams in Senior 1 and 12 teams in Senior 2.

==== Senior 1 teams ====
Team	Location	Division	Colours	In Senior 1 championship since	Championship titles	Last championship title
Ballyboden St Enda's	Knocklyon	South Dublin	Blue and white	2022 (first year)	7	2018
Cuala	Dalkey	Dún Laoghaire–Rathdown	Red and white	2022 (first year)	8	2020
Erins Isle	Finglas	Dublin City	Green with black band	2026	1	1983
Faughs	Templeogue	South Dublin	Green and yellow	2026	31	1999
Kilmacud Crokes	Stillorgan	Dún Laoghaire–Rathdown	Purple and yellow	2022 (first year)	8	2026
Lucan Sarsfields	Lucan	South Dublin	White and green	2022 (first year)	0	—
Na Fianna	Glasnevin	Dublin City	Yellow and blue	2022 (first year)	3	2025
Naomh Barróg	Kilbarrack	Dublin City	Green and red	2025	0	—
St Brigid's	Castleknock	Fingal	Red and white	2022 (first year)	0	—
St Jude's	Templeogue	South Dublin	Navy and Sky Blue	2025	0	—
St Vincent's	Marino	Dublin City	Blue and white	2022 (first year)	13	1993
Whitehall Colmcille	Collins Avenue	Dublin City	White and red	2023	0	—

==== Senior 2 teams ====
Team	Location	Division	Colours	In Senior 2 championship since	Dublin Senior Championship titles	Last senior championship title
Ballinteer St John's	Ballinteer	South Dublin	Orange and black	2025	0	—
Ballyboden St Enda's	Knocklyon	South Dublin	Blue and white stripes	2025	7	2018
Castleknock	Castleknock	Fingal	Blue and yellow	2022 (first year)	0	—
Clontarf	Clontarf	Dublin City	Red and white	2025	0	—
Commercials	Rathcoole	South Dublin	Red and green	2026	9	1916
Craobh Chiaráin	Donnycarney	Dublin City	Maroon and white	2026	5	2006
Kilmacud Crokes	Stillorgan	Dún Laoghaire–Rathdown	Purple and gold	2022 (first year)	8	2026
Naomh Mearnóg	Portmarnock	Fingal	Black and amber	2024	0	—
Raheny	Raheny	Dublin City	Maroon and white	2024	0	—
St Oliver Plunketts/Eoghan Ruadh	Navan Road	Dublin City	Maroon and gold	2026	1	1951 (as Eoghan Rua)
St Sylvester's	Malahide	Fingal	Blue with a green sash	2026	0	—
Thomas Davis	Tallaght	South Dublin	Green with gold sash	2022 (first year)	1	1913

== Roll of honour ==
=== By club ===
#	Club	Titles	Runners-up	Championships won	Championships runner-up
1	Faughs	31	22	1892, 1900, 1901, 1903, 1904, 1906, 1910, 1911, 1914, 1915, 1920, 1921, 1922, 1923, 1930, 1936, 1939, 1940, 1941, 1944, 1945, 1946, 1950, 1952, 1970, 1972, 1973, 1986, 1987, 1992, 1999	1899, 1907, 1908, 1916, 1917, 1918, 1919, 1925, 1927, 1928, 1931, 1947, 1948, 1949, 1954, 1955, 1958, 1969, 1974, 1977, 1978, 1980
2	St Vincents	13	14	1953, 1954, 1955, 1957, 1960, 1962, 1964, 1967, 1975, 1981, 1982, 1988, 1993	1951, 1952, 1959, 1961, 1970, 1971, 1989, 1990, 1995, 1997, 2000, 2005, 2007, 2010
3	Commercials	9	3	1895, 1896, 1897, 1898, 1899, 1901, 1907, 1909, 1916	1906, 1911, 1929
4	UCD	8	8	1934, 1947, 1948, 1961, 1968, 2000, 2004, 2005	1932, 1935, 1936, 1937, 1943, 1945, 1950, 1965
4	Kilmacud Crokes	8	8	1974, 1976, 1985, 2012, 2014, 2021, 2022, 2026	1968, 1984, 1996, 2008, 2016, 2017, 2018, 2024
4	O'Tooles	8	6	1969, 1977, 1984, 1990, 1995, 1996, 1997, 2002	1972, 1973, 1981, 1982, 1985, 2011
4	Cuala	8	3	1989, 1991, 1994, 2015, 2016, 2017, 2019, 2020	1987, 2012, 2026
8	Ballyboden St Enda's	7	7	2007, 2008, 2009, 2010, 2011, 2013, 2018	1983, 1988, 2001, 2004, 2006, 2020, 2023
9	Young Irelands	6	5	1932, 1937, 1942, 1943, 1949, 1965	1924, 1934, 1938, 1946, 1963
9	Garda	6	2	1925, 1926, 1927, 1928, 1929, 1931	1930, 1933
11	Craobh Chiaráin	5	7	1971, 1998, 2001, 2003, 2006	1975, 1976, 1991, 1992, 1999, 2002, 2009
12	Kickhams	4	3	1889, 1890, 1908, 1924	1910, 1913, 1920
13	Collegians	3	2	1917, 1918, 1919	1914, 1923
13	Rapparees	3	0	1891, 1894, 1912	—
13	Army Metro	3	0	1933, 1935, 1938	
13	Na Fianna	3	2	2023, 2024, 2025	2021, 2022
17	New Irelands	2	3	1958, 1959	1956, 1957, 1960
17	Crumlin	2	3	1978, 1979	1993, 1994, 1998
19	Eoghan Ruadhs^{A}	1	5	1951	1939, 1940, 1941, 1942, 1944
19	St Columbas^{B}	1	4	1956	1962, 1964, 1966, 1967
19	Davitts	1	3	1893	1887, 1889, 1891
19	Thomas Davis	1	3	1913	1909, 1912, 1915
19	St Brendan's	1	1	1980	1979
19	Erins Isle	1	1	1983	1986
19	Metropolitans	1	0	1887	—
19	Junior Board Selection	1	0	1963	—
19	Crokes^{C}	1	0	1966	—
28	St Jude's	0	2	—	2014, 2015
28	St Brigid's	0	2	—	2003, 2019
28	Lucan Sarsfields	0	2	—	2013, 2025
28	Dunleary	0	1	—	1888
28	Erin's Pride	0	1	—	1890
28	Celtics	0	1	—	1895
28	Grocers	0	1	—	1921
28	Kevin's	0	1	—	1926
28	Civil Service	0	1	—	1953

=== Notes ===
No competition: 1888, 1902.

^{A}: Eoghan Ruadhs Hurling Club and St Oliver Plunketts Football Club amalgamated to form St Oliver Plunketts/Eoghan Ruadh GAA in the 1990s.

^{B}: St Columbas Hurling Club and St Agnes Football Club amalgamated to form Crumlin GAA in 1970.

^{C}: Crokes Hurling Club and Kilmacud Football Club amalgamated to form Kilmacud Crokes GAA in 1966.

== List of finals ==
=== List of Dublin SHC finals ===
Year	Winners		Runners-up		Referee
Year	Club	Score	Club	Score	Referee
2026	Kilmacud Crokes	2-17	Cuala	0-12	Seán Stack
2025	Na Fianna	1–20	Lucan Sarsfields	0–22	Rory Hanley
2024	Na Fianna	3–16	Kilmacud Crokes	2–18	Seán Stack
2023	Na Fianna	2–19	Ballyboden St Enda's	0-09	Chris Mooney
2022	Kilmacud Crokes	0-20	Na Fianna	0–17	Thomas Gleeson
2021 AET	Kilmacud Crokes	4-26	Na Fianna	2-25	Chris Mooney
2020	Cuala	2-20	Ballyboden St Enda's	1–18	Seán Stack
2019	Cuala	1–18	St Brigid's	1–14	Thomas Gleeson
2018 Replay	Ballyboden St Enda's	2–15	Kilmacud Crokes	1–15	Jason Buckley
2018 AET	Ballyboden St Enda's	2–17	Kilmacud Crokes	1-20	Chris Mooney
2017	Cuala	1–13	Kilmacud Crokes	0–13	Finbarr Gaffney
2016	Cuala	1–15	Kilmacud Crokes	0–15	Seán Stack
2015	Cuala	3–14	St Jude's	0–13	Antoin Keating
2014	Kilmacud Crokes	2–16	St Jude's	1–15	Danny Harrington
2013	Ballyboden St Enda's	0–13	Lucan Sarsfields	0–10	James Brennan
2012	Kilmacud Crokes	2–10	Cuala	0-09	Peader Behan
2011	Ballyboden St Enda's	3–12	O'Toole's	0-09	Gearoid McGrath
2010	Ballyboden St Enda's	3–17	St Vincent's	1–10	Dave O'Donovan
2009	Ballyboden St Enda's	1–16	Craobh Chiaráin	1–12	Eoin Mullarkey
2008	Ballyboden St Enda's	0–17	Kilmacud Crokes	0-07	Paddy Power
2007	Ballyboden St Enda's	2–13	St Vincent's	1-05	Camilus Fitzpatrick
2006	Craobh Chiaráin	2–10	Ballyboden St Enda's	2-08	Mick Butler
2005	UCD	3–13	St Vincent's	2–10	Dave O'Donovan
2004	UCD	1–13	Ballyboden St Enda's	0-09	Tony Lambe
2003	Craobh Chiaráin	3–15	St Brigid's	3-06	Aodhan MacSuibhne
2002 Replay	O'Toole's	1–13	Craobh Chiaráin	2-07	Paul Tobin
2002	O'Toole's	3-09	Craobh Chiaráin	0–18	Eoin Mullarkey
2001	Craobh Chiaráin	2–11	Ballyboden St Enda's	1–13	Aodhan MacSuibhne
2000	UCD	3–15	St Vincent's	1-09	Eamonn Morris
1999	Faughs	1–11	Craobh Chiaráin	2-05	Gene Hernon
1998	Craobh Chiaráin	2–11	Crumlin	1-06	Eamonn Morris
1997	O'Toole's	2–10	St Vincent's	0-08	L Ó Maolamhnaigh
1996	O'Toole's	2–12	Kilmacud Crokes	2–10	N O'Donncha
1995	O'Toole's	2-08	St Vincent's	0–10	
1994	Cuala	1–16	Crumlin	0–16	M Kiely
1993	St Vincent's	3–10	Crumlin	2–11	C Ó Foghlú
1992	Faughs	2–13	Craobh Chiaráin	1-06	Aodhan MacSuibhne
1991 Replay	Cuala	4-06	Craobh Chiaráin	1-07	S Ó Horgáin
1991	Cuala	0-08	Craobh Chiaráin	0-08	S Ó Horgáin
1990 Replay	O'Toole's	2–16	St Vincent's	1–13	Aodhan MacSuibhne
1990	O'Toole's	0–14	St Vincent's	1–11	Aodhan MacSuibhne
1989	Cuala	2-08	St Vincent's	1-05	
1988	St Vincent's	2–16	Ballyboden St Enda's	1–14	J F Bailey
1987	Faughs	1–11	Cuala	1-07	
1986	Faughs	1-07	Erins Isle	1-04	
1985	Kilmacud Crokes	2–10	O'Toole's	1–11	J F Bailey
1984	O'Toole's	0–14	Kilmacud Crokes	0–10	
1983	Erins Isle	2-09	Ballyboden St Enda's	2-06	
1982	St Vincent's	3-04	O'Toole's	0–10	J.F. Bailey
1981 Replay	St Vincents	5–10	O'Toole's	3–10	
1981	St Vincents	2-07	O'Toole's	1–10	J Leonard
1980	St Brendan's	6–10	Faughs	4–13	
1979 Replay	Crumlin	1–17	St Brendan's	0–10	
1979	Crumlin	0–10	St Brendan's	0–10	
1978	Crumlin	3–13	Faughs	1–11	M McCoy
1977	O'Toole's	0–14	Faughs	1-09	N. O'Donoghue
1976	Kilmacud Crokes	0–17	Craobh Chiaráin	2-08	
1975	St Vincent's	4-08	Craobh Chiaráin	1–11	G. Somerville
1974	Kilmacud Crokes	3–13	Faughs	4-09	S. Barcoe
1973 Replay	Faughs	2-07	O'Tooles	1-06	B. Lowth
1973	Faughs	2-08	O'Tooles	1–11	B. Lowth
1972	Faughs	1–12	O'Tooles	3-02	C. Foley
1971	Craobh Chiaráin	3–18	St Vincent's	3-06	T. Kearney
1970	Faughs	5–15	St Vincent's	3-09	
1969	O'Tooles	4-08	Faughs	2-09	
1968 Replay	UCD	7-09	Kilmacud Crokes	2-08	
1968	UCD	3-08	Kilmacud Crokes	3-08	J. Gray
1967	St Vincent's	3–13	St Columbas	1-09	C. Foley
1966	Crokes	6-07	St Columbas	7-03	
1965	Young Irelands	2–11	UCD	3-05	P. Edwards
1964	St Vincent's	1–10	St Columbas	1-05	Willie Walsh
1963	Junior Board Selection	4–13	Young Irelands	2-06	C. McLoughlin
1962	St Vincent's	3–10	St Columbas	3-02	
1961	UCD	3-09	St Vincent's	1-09	C. Foley
1960	St Vincent's	3–10	New Irelands	2-06	C. Foley
1959	New Irelands	2–11	St Vincent's	2-06	E. Barron
1958	New Irelands	4–11	Faughs	0-08	C. McLoughlin
1957	St Vincent's	3–10	New Irelands	3-04	
1956	St Columbas	2–12	New Irelands	1-08	C. McLoughlin
1955	St Vincent's	5-08	Faughs	4-09	P. Connell
1954	St Vincent's	4-08	Faughs	2-07	
1953	St Vincent's	4–10	Civil Service	3-05	
1952	Faughs	2–10	St Vincent's	4-01	J. Silke
1951	Eoghan Ruadhs	6-06	St Vincent's	2-08	R. O'Shea
1950	Faughs	5-05	UCD	2–10	R. Howard
1949	Young Irelands	2–11	Faughs	4-04	Dr. J.J. Stuart
1948	UCD	3-08	Faughs	2-07	G. Kelly
1947	UCD	4-09	Faughs	6-02	
1946	Faughs	7-05	Young Irelands	0-05	
1945	Faughs	5-06	UCD	4-05	
1944	Faughs	2–11	Eoghan Ruadhs	2-08	
1943	Young Irelands	6–10	UCD	3-03	G. Kelly
1942	Young Irelands	4-06	Eoghan Ruadhs	2-07	
1941	Faughs	2-09	Eoghan Ruadhs	2-06	
1940	Faughs	3-05	Eoghan Ruadhs	1–10	Dr. C. Stuart
1939	Faughs	3–10	Eoghan Ruadhs	3-01	J. Hehir
1938	Army Metro	4-08	Young Irelands	5-04	
1937	Young Irelands	7-04	UCD	2-04	
1936	Faughs	4-08	UCD	3-04	
1935	Army Metro	3-04	UCD	1-04	
1934	UCD	4-05	Young Irelands	2-04	
1933	Army Metro	3-06	Garda	3-04	
1932	Young Irelands	8-02	UCD	3-01	
1931	Garda	5-04	Faughs	3-02	
1930	Faughs	2-03	Garda	1-01	
1929	Garda	8-05	Commercials	2-00	
1928	Garda	3-04	Faughs	1-01	J. Hawe
1927	Garda	4-06	Faughs	3-02	W. Small
1926	Garda	7–14	Kevin's	1-03	
1925	Garda	8–10	Faughs	2-02	P. Kennefick
1924	Kickhams	6-07	Young Irelands	5-02	W. Small
1923	Faughs	7-09	Collegians	1-00	
1922	Faughs				
1921	Faughs	6-03	Grocers	1-03	
1920	Faughs	3-04	Kickhams	1-00	G. Kennefick
1919	Collegians	8-05	Faughs	2-01	J. Fletcher
1918	Collegians	3-00	Faughs	0-05	
1917	Collegians	3-05	Faughs	1-05	
1916	Commercials	4-05	Faughs	3-03	
1915	Faughs	9-05	Thomas Davis	2-05	P. Kennefick
1914	Faughs	11–03	Collegians	3-01	F. Crowe
1913	Davis	4-07	Kickhams	2-00	
1912	Rapparees	4-00	Davis	2-01	
1911	Faughs	4-01	Commercials	4-00	P. Kennefick
1910	Faughs	2–13	Kickhams	1-09	J. Quigley
1909	Commercials	2–11	Davis	1-08	
1908	Kickhams	2-06	Faughs	2-04	John Quigley
1907	Commercials	2-04	Faughs	0-09	F. Crowe
1906 2nd Replay	Faughs	1–11	Commercials	2-07	
1906 Replay	Faughs	2-03	Commercials	0-09	
1906	Faughs	5-04	Commercials	5-04	
1905	Commercials				
1904	Faughs				
1903	Faughs				
1902	No Competition				
1901	Faughs				
1900	Faughs				
1899	Commercials	6-07	Faughs	2-05	L. O'Kelly
1898	Commercials				
1897	Commercials				
1896	Commercials				
1895	Commercials	1–10	Celtics	1-02	W. Keogh
1894	Rapparees				
1893	Davitts				
1892	Davitt-Faughs				
1891	Rapparees	4-02	Davitts	1-05	C. Thomson
1890	Kickhams	3-06	Erin's Pride	0-02	T. Power
1889	Kickhams	3-07	Davitts	0-05	
1888	Kickhams	2-06	Dunleary	1-?	
1887	Metropolitans	4-12 (6 forfeit points)	Davitts	1-05 (3 forfeit points)	L. O'Toole

== Records and statistics ==
The Dublin Senior Hurling Championship has been contested 124 times since its inception in 1887. The first team to win the tournament was the Metropolitans, who never won the title again. The most successful club in the history of the Dublin Senior Hurling Championship has been Faughs who have won the competition on 31 occasions, their last title captured in 1999. St Vincents, who are the most successful football club in Dublin, are second with a total of 13 titles, their last in 1993. The record for most consecutive titles is held by Commercials, Garda and more recently Ballyboden St Enda's who each secured a five-in-a-row between the years 1895–99, 1925–29 and 2007-2011 respectively.

Ballyboden St Enda's won 5 consecutive titles since 2007 and contested a total of 8 finals in 10 years. In 2009, they won the double, claiming both the hurling and football championship. This was the first time that a Dublin club had won the double since St Vincents had achieved it in 1981.

== See also ==
- Dublin Senior 2 Hurling Championship
- Dublin Senior 3 Hurling Championship
- Dublin Intermediate Hurling Championship
- Dublin Junior A Hurling Championship
