= Kevin's Hurling Club =

Kevin's
- Cumman Báire Caoimhín
- Founded: 1902
- County: Dublin
- Nickname: Caoimhin
- Colours: Blue and white
- Grounds: Dolphin Park
- Coordinates: 53°19′46.33″N 6°17′36.61″W

Playing kits
Standard colours

Kevin's is a hurling club based in Dolphin's Barn in Dublin's south inner city, Ireland.

== History ==
Kevin's began promoting hurling and Gaelic football in Dublin's south inner city in 1902. It evolved from the Craobh Chaoimhín of Conradh na Gaeilge. The founder members included Joe O'Neill and Jim Maguire. Information on the formative years is sparse, but Harry O'Kelly, a staunch club member, was believed to be of central importance to the club at this time.

The club attained senior status in 1910, in the mid-1920s and again in the late 1930s and had sporadic success at senior, intermediate, junior and juvenile levels. In the mid 1940s, Synge Street P.P. G.F.C. was formed and it assumed responsibility for football in the area. Kevin's became solely a hurling club.

In 1993, the club formed a camogie section. The foundation of Kevin's Camogie section was the result of a new policy being pushed by both the younger members and parent, who wanted to create both a family and community atmosphere within the area.

As of the 21st century, Kevin's Hurling and Camogie club continues to promote hurling (And now Rounders & Handball ) in Dublin's south inner city. The club's home ground is in Dolphin Park on the Crumlin Road.

The club runs an All-Ireland Easter Hurling Festival. This event was first run in April 2007 and it is recognised by the Dublin County Board and the GAA. Emeralds of Urlngford won the inaugural Brian Scott Cup (Senior Competition), beating Camross of Laois in the final. The 2010 tournament was won by Meelick Eyrecourt of Galway.

== Notable players ==
John Dunne was the first Kevin's man to represent the club at senior inter-county level in 1914.

Joe Connolly (Leader in City Hall) and Seamus Doyle (Battle of Mount Street Bridge) were two of many Kevin's men who took part in the 1916 uprising.

Sylvestor "Vesty" Muldowney, Charlie McMahon, Brendan Kinna and John Lawless played for successful Dublin teams in the late 1920s and early 1930s. Kevin's supplied a number of players to the first county team to win a National League title. Vesty played a role in 1932 when Dublin reached the National League final and Charlie won an All-Ireland medal with the Dubs in 1939.

Freddie Strahan was a member of the club team that won the 1956 Dublin Minor Hurling Championship. The following year he signed for the Shelbourne Soccer Club and played in the Republic of Ireland national football team at senior international level.

Gerry Ryan hurled with Dublin at various levels before representing the club at senior inter-county level for a number of years in the early 1970s.

Mick Bollard hurled at minor and under-21 level with the Dubs before establishing himself as a regular keeper on the senior hurling team in the early 1980s. He was on the last senior county hurling panel to reach the National League semi-finals. Other club hurlers who played senior inter-county level included John Treacey, Donal Tutty, Joey Dalton, Andy Doyle, Greg Balfe and Tommy Daly.

Sean O'Shea is the only Kevin's man to play with the Dublin senior intercounty hurling team in its second century.

== Roll of honour ==
=== Hurling ===
- Dublin Senior Hurling Championship:s (0):- Finalists 1926
- Dublin Senior B Hurling Championship Finalists 1999
- Dublin Senior Hurling League Division Two Winners (5): 1913, 1985, 1987, 1989, 1996
- Dublin Intermediate Hurling Championship:s (4): 1924, 1979, 2002, 2010
- Leinster Junior Club Hurling Championship: Finalists 2002
- Dublin Intermediate Hurling Leagues (2): 1979 – runners up in 1978
- Corn Céitinn (2): 1938, 1978
- Dublin Junior Hurling Championships (4): 1910, 1939, 1978, 2025 – finalists in 1977
- Dublin Junior Hurling League (3): 1908, 1937, 1954
- Corn Fogarty (1): 1988
- Miller Shield (1): 2003
- Fletcher Shield (1): 2001
- Dublin Under 21 Hurling Championship:s (0):- Finalists in 1979
- Dublin Minor Hurling Championship:s (4): 1919, 1922, 1923, 1956 – finalists in 1978
- Féile na nGael (3): 1982 Div 3, 1985 Div 5, 2005 Div 2,

=== Camogie ===
- Dublin Junior B Camogie Shield (1): 2008
- Dublin Junior B 2 Camogie League (1): 2008
- Dublin Junior B Camogie Open Cup (1): 2008
- Mascot Cup Winners (1): 1997

=== Gaelic football ===
- Dublin Minor Football Championships (4) 1932, 1937, 1938, 1940. Kevins also won in 1922, but this is not recorded as a championship
