= 1949 Dublin Senior Hurling Championship =

Annual hurling competition season

- Champions: Young Irelands (5th title)
- Runners-up: Faughs

The 1949 Dublin Senior Hurling Championship was the 62nd staging of the Dublin Senior Hurling Championship since its establishment by the Dublin County Board in 1887.

University College Dublin entered the championship as the defending champions.

The final was played on 5 June 1949 at Croke Park in Dublin, between Young Irelands and Faughs, in what was their second meeting in the final overall. Young Irelands won the match by 2–11 to 4–04 to claim their fifth championship title overall and a first title in six years.

== Results ==
=== Final ===
5 June 1949 Final	Young Irelands	2-11 - 4-04	Faughs	Croke Park
