= 1891 Dublin Senior Hurling Championship =

Annual hurling competition season

- Champions: Rapparees (1st title)
- Runners-up: Davitts

The 1891 Dublin Senior Hurling Championship was the fifth staging of the Dublin Senior Hurling Championship since its establishment by the Dublin County Board.

Kickhams entered the championship as the defending chammpions.

The final was played on 4 October 1891 at Clonturk Park in Dublin, between Rapparees and Davitts, in what was their first ever meeting in the final. Rapparees won the match by 4–02 to 1–05 to claim their first ever championship title.

== Results ==
=== Final ===
4 October 1891 Final	Rapparees	4-02 - 1-05	Davitts	Clonturk Park
