= 1887 Dublin Senior Hurling Championship =

Annual hurling competition season

- Champions: Metropolitans (1st title)
- Runners-up: Davitts

The 1887 Dublin Senior Hurling Championship was the inaugural staging of the Dublin Senior Hurling Championship since its establishment by the Dublin County Board.

The final was played on 17 April 1887 at Elm Park in Dublin, between Metropolitans and Davitts, in what was their first ever meeting in the final. Metropolitans won the match by 4–12 to 1–05 to claim their first ever championship title.

== Results ==
=== Final ===
17 April 1887 Final	Metropolitans	4-12 - 1-05	Davitts	Elm Park
