= 2009 Dublin Senior Football Championship =

- 2009 Craobh Sinsear Peile; Bhaile Átha Cliath

Tournament details
- County: Dublin
- Year: 2009

Winners
- Champions: Ballyboden St. Enda's (2nd win)
- Manager: Liam O'Dwyer

Promotion/Relegation
- Promoted team(s): St Patrick's, Palmerstown
- Relegated team(s): Naomh Olaf

The 2009 Dublin Senior Football Championship is the inter club Gaelic football competition between the top teams in Dublin GAA.

== First round ==
The winners of the first round progress to the second round, the losers go on to a backdoor round with a chance to progress to the second round.

April 29
First Round

Whitehall Colmcille	0-03 - 1-17	St Judes
S Gallagher 1-1 (0-1f), J Donnelly 0-4 (2f, 1 45), K McManamon 0-3, P Cunningham, A Glover, R Joyce 0-2 each, C Murphy, M Lyons, R O’Brien 0-1 each.		G Beirne, S Walsh, J Morrissey 0-1 each.

Venue: Parnell Park
Referee: T McCarthy Snr
(St Vincents)

April 30
First Round

St Annes	2-08 - 0-14	Thomas Davis
A Doran (1f), S O’Connor (2f) 0-3, A McNally, C McKeown 1-0, D Watson 0-2.		P O’Connor (3f), S McGrath 0-3 each, C Farrelly, E Behan 0-2, P Boland, J O’Connor, J O’Reilly, S Downey 0-1 each.

Venue: O'Toole Park
Referee: J Rutherford
(Ballyboden St Enda's)

May 12
First Round

St Annes	2-10 - 1-17	Thomas Davis
D Watson 1-1, A McNally 1-0, D OKeeffe 0-3 (0-2f), A Doran (0-2f), L Comiskey 0-2 each, C OGara, J Nolan 0-1 each.		P OConnor 0-5 (0-5f), S McGrath, C Farrelly 0-4 each, S McKeown 1-0, E Behan 0-2, J OConnor, J OReilly 0-1 each.

Venue: O'Toole Park
Referee: T Lambe
(St Vincents)

April 29
First Round

St Vincents	0-11 - 0-07	Ballyboden St Endas
T Quinn 0-8 (6f, 1 ‘45’), D Connolly 0-2, A O’Malley 0-1.		K Naughton (1f), S Owens 0-2 each, J O’Hara, D O’Mahony, M MacAuley 0-1 each.

Parnell Park'
Referee: G McCormack
Naomh Barróg

April 29
First Round

Clontarf	1-08 - 0-07	Erins Isle
I O’Dwyer 0-6 (6f), S Dunlea 1-1, I Smith 0-1.		K Dunne 0-3, P Murray 0-2 (1f), L Sweetman (f), T Gorman (1f) 0-1 each.

Venue: Balgriffin
Referee: K Roche (Whitehall Comcilles)

April 30
First Round

St Marks	1-07 - 0-09	Fingallians
A Gildea 1-01, S McCann, C Donoghue 0-02 each, B Redmond, B Kennedy 0-01 each.		P Flynn 0-03, D Killeen 0-02 (1f), P Lawless, C Farrell, P Murtagh, B Clarke, I Quigley 0-01 each.

Venue: Portmarnock
Referee: T Dennehy
(Naomh Mearnóg)

May 1
First Round

Kilmacud Crokes	1-08 - 2-10	Lucan Sarsfields
M Vaughan 1-4 (0-4f), R Cosgrove 0-2, A Morrissey, B Kavanagh 0-1 each.		J Doyle 1-4 (0-2f, 0-1 45), J ONeill 1-0, D Quinn (0-1f), P Callaghan 0-2 each, D Gallagher, D OShaughnessy 0-1 each.

Venue: Parnell Park
Referee: A McAllister
(Starlights)

April 30
First Round

Fingal Ravens	1-11 - 0-16	St Brigids
W Finnegan 1-2 (0-2f), P Brennan (0-1f), PJ Casey 0-2 each, I Kavanagh (45), K Kavanagh, N Tormey, D Flanagan, S Madigan 0-1 each.		Paddy Andrews 0-5 (0-1f), K Darcy 0-3 (0-3f), Mark Cahill (0-2f), G McIntyre, D Lally 0-2 each, K Bonner, L McCarthy 0-1 each.

Venue: Parnell Park
Referee: N Cocoman
(St Oliver Plunkett's/ER)

April 29
First Round

St Marys	1-14 - 2-10	UCD
C Lyng 1-4 (1-0 pen, 2f), M MacDonald 0-3 (1f), C Kelly, J O’Loughlin, S Quinn 0-2 each, B Moloney 0-1.		D Marshall 2-2 (0-1f), B Kelly 0-3 (2f), L Magee 0-2, C. Broderick, D Byrne, D Carrigan 0-1 each.

Parnell Park
Referee: J Fagan
(Erins Isle)

May 1
First Round

Raheny	0-07 - 1-14	St Oliver Plunketts/Eoghan Ruadh
E Delaney 0-4 (0-4f), M OKeeffe 0-2, D Henry 0-1 (0-1f).		B Brogan 0-7 (0-3f), A Brogan 1-0, G Smith 0-3 (0-1f), R McConnell 0-2, J Brogan, J Sherlock 0-1 each.

Venue: Parnell Park
Referee: T Carton
(Nh Fionnbarra)

May 2
First Round

Naomh Olaf	0-07 - 2-11	O'Tooles
D Farrelly 1-5 (0-2f), W OConnor 1-0, D Mooney 0-2, A Morris, C Mulligan, S Doyle, P Bradshaw 0-1 each.		E Kinsella 0-5 (0-2f, 0-1 45), D Burke, S Hickey 0-1 each.

Venue: O'Toole Park
Referee: J Turner
(Thomas Davis)

April 30
First Round

St Sylvesters	0-11 - 0-12	Ballymun Kickhams
D Clarke 0-7 (0-3f), A Relihan (0-1f), D Kinsella 0-2 each.		Derek Byrne 0-5 (0-4f), J Whelan 0-3 (0-1f), T Furman, D Rock 0-2 each.

Venue: Balgriffin
Referee: J Murray
(Castleknock)

May 2
First Round

Trinity Gaels	1-12 - 4-13	Round Towers (C)
E McInerney 0-6 (0-4f, 0-1 pen), D Kinsella 1-0, G Dillon, D Kelly 0-2 each, C OKeeffe, M Forde 0-1 each.		J OBrien 2-7 (0-1f), D Whelan, J McGrane 1-1 each, Derek Murray, M Taylor (0-1f), B Keane, C Cross 0-1 each.

Venue: O'Toole Park
Referee: P Kiernan
(Nh Olaf)

April 30
First Round

Parnells	1-10 - 1-14	Na Fianna
S Cluxton 1-0 (1-0 pen), J Peyton (0-2f), M Whelan (0-2f) 0-3 each, N Collins 0-2, G Collins, C Parkinson 0-1 each.		D Quinn 1-3, C Duignan 0-5 (0-2f), B Courtney, B Downes, S Connell 0-2 each.

Venue: Parnell Park
Referee: P Fitzsimons
(Liffey Gaels)

May 1
First Round

Naomh Mearnóg	0-07 - 1-13	St Maurs
J Madden, Shane Ryan jr 0-2 each, E Forde, A Byrne, F Doyle 0-1 each.		C Moore 1-6 (0-5f), D Carrick, C Carthy (0-1f) 0-2 each, P Butterly, D Byrne, D McGrath 0-1 each.

Venue: Naul
Referee: D Feeney
Parnells

April 29
First Round

Ballinteer St Johns	0-09 - 0-09	Templeogue Synge St
D Treanor 0-3 (2f), G Vickery (2f), C Morley 0-2 each, A O’Brien, D Bastick 0-1 each.		F Ward 0-5 (5f), P O’Connor 0-2 (1 ‘45’), J Gillick, N McCabe 0-1 each.

Venue: O'Toole Park
Referee: B Carroll
(Fingal Ravens)

May 12
First Round Replay

Ballinteer St Johns	3-12 - 1-05	Templeogue Synge St
D Goggins 1-4, N Devereux, P O’Donnell 1-0, S McCann 0-3, F Ward 0-2 (2f), J Oliver, P O’Connor, J McNally 0-1 each.		D Treanor 1-3, D Bastick (‘45’), G Vickery 0-1 each.

Venue: O'Toole Park
Referee: B O'Shea
(St Marks)

- Bye V St Peregrine's

== Qualifier Round ==
The Backdoor round or the qualifier round features all the teams who lost in the first round of the championship. It gives each team a second chance to progress in the championship by moving on to the third round. The losers of the backdoor games will go on to the relegation playoffs with the eventual loser moving to the Dublin Intermediate Football Championship. The teams taking part in the backdoor round are Whitehall Colmcille, St Annes, Ballyboden St Endas, Erins Isle, St Marks, Kilmacud Crokes, St Brigids, UCD, Raheny, Naomh Olaf, St Sylvesters, Trinity Gaels, Parnells, Naomh Mearnóg, Templepgue Synge Street.

May 13
Backdoor Round

Whitehall Colmcille	0-07 - 1-08	St Sylvesters
G Beirne 0-3 (0-3f), S Ryan 0-2, B Mulligan, S Walsh 0-1 each.		S Roche 1-2, A Relihan 0-4 (0-4f), S OConnor, B Sexton 0-1 each.

Venue: St Margarets
Referee: F Shanahan
(St Margarets)

May 14
Backdoor Round

Parnells	1-09 - 1-06	Fingal Ravens
J Peyton 0-3 (0-1f), D Rooney 1-0, N Collins, J Collins, C Parkinson 0-2 each.		W Finnegan 0-3, C Norton 1-0, N Tormey 0-2 (0-1f), PJ Casey 0-1.

Venue: TBA
Referee: S Farrell
(St Patricks, Donabate)

May 17
Backdoor Round

Kilmacud Crokes	2-05 - 0-05	Templeogue SS
J Magee, P Burke 1-0 each, R Cosgrove 0-3 (0-3f), K Nolan, A Morrissey 0-1 each.		D Treanor 0-2 (0-2f), C Byrne, D Bastick (0-1f), C O’Reilly 0-1 each.

Venue: O'Toole Park
Referee: A Cummins
(Round Towers, Clondalkin)

May 16
Backdoor Round

Naomh Olaf	2-06 - 1-10	Trinity Gaels
E Kinsella (1-0 pen, 0-3f), D Lynch (0-1f) 1-3 each.		E McInerney 1-2 (0-2f), C OKeeffe (0-2f), D Kelly 0-2 each, G Dillon, D Condon, J McCann, M Forde 0-1 each.

Venue: Balgriffin
Referee: T McCarthy
(St Vincents)

May 16
Backdoor Round

St Marys, Saggart	2-14 - 3-09	St Annes
B Kelly 0-6 (0-3f), Declan Byrne 1-1, C Broderick 1-0, D Marshall 0-3 (0-1f), L Magee 0-2, A Marshall, David Byrne 0-1 each.		A McNally 1-1, D OKeeffe 0-4 (0-2f), D Watson (1-0 pen), D Fullam 1-0 each, C McKeown 0-2 (0-1f), S Stewart, C Lestrange 0-1 each.

Venue: O'Toole Park
Referee: J Murray
(Castleknock)

May 20
Backdoor Round

Erins Isle	1-10 - 0-06	Naomh Mearnóg
D Moher, L Sweetman 0-4 each, K Dunne 1-0, N Carty, D Fox 0-1 each.		C Brannigan (0-2f), A Sheppard (0-1f) 0-2 each, E Forde, C O'Driscoll 0-1 each.

Venue: Balgriffin
Referee: D Feeney
Parnells

May 16
Backdoor Round

Raheny	1-16 - 0-11	Fingallians
D Henry 1-4 (0-1f), C Whelan 0-3, M O'Keeffe (0-2f), J Keogh, E Delaney 0-2 each, C Murphy, N Sullivan, J Ryan 0-1 each.		P Lawless 0-6 (0-2f, 0-1 45), D Fagan 0-2, C Farrell, I Quigley, P Flynn 0-1 each.

Venue: Balgriffin
Referee: D Harrington
Nh Mearnóg

- Ballyboden St Enda's bye

== Relegation Playoffs ==
The teams fighting for survival in the 2009 championship are: Whitehall Colmcille, Fingal Ravens, Templeogue Synge Street, Naomh Olaf, St Annes, Naomh Mearnóg and Fingallians.

August
First Round

St Annes	0-07 - 0-14	Naomh Mearnóg

August
Third Round

Whitehall Colmcille	0-00 - 0-00	Naomh Olaf

August
First Round

Fingallians	0-00 - 0-00	Fingal Ravens

- Templeogue Synge Street go straight to the second round.
September 2
Second Round

Fingal Ravens	0-10 - 1-05	Naomh Olaf

August
Second Round

St Annes	3-07 - 1-10	Templeogue Synge Street

September
Second Round

St Olafs	0-00 - 0-00	Templeogue Synge Street

== Second round ==
May 13
Backdoor Round

Clontarf	0-05 - 1-09	Round Towers, (C)
D Mullins 0-2, G Carey, I ODwyer (0-1f), I Smith 0-1 each.		J OBrien 0-6 (0-3f), D Whelan 1-0, M Taylor 0-2 (1f), P Swinburne 0-1.

Venue: Blakestown
Referee: P Faughnan
(St Patrick's, Palmerstown)

May 17
Backdoor Round

St Judes	2-15 - 0-07	Ballinteer St Johns
K McManamon 1-4 (0-2f), J Donnelly 0-6 (0-2f, 0-1 45), B McManamon 0-4, S Gallagher 1-0, C Murphy 0-1.		J McNally 0-3 (0-1f), C O’Donnell, F Ward (0-1f), P O’Connor, S OReilly 0-1 each.

Venue: O'Toole Park
Referee: J Fagan
(Erins Isle)

May 15
Backdoor Round

St Brigids	0-04 - 1-10	St Oliver Plunketts/Eoghan Ruadh
Mark Cahill 0-2 (0-1f), K Darcy, L McCarthy (0-1 45) 0-1 each.		B Brogan 1-4 (0-4f), J Sherlock 0-3, G Smith 0-2 (0-1 45), R McConnell, C Dunleavy 0-1 each.

Venue: Parnell Park
Referee: K Higgins
(Na Fianna)

May 14
Backdoor Round

St Peregrines	0-07 - 0-06	UCD
C McGuinness 0-4 (2f), S Sweeney, S Lowndes, G Moore 0-1 each.		J OLoughlin, C Lyng (1f) 0-2 each, C Kelly, S Quinn 0-1 each.

Venue: Russell Park
Referee: S Finucane
(Templeogue Synge Street)

May 15
Backdoor Round

St Vincents	3-10 - 1-10	Na Fianna
T Quinn 2-4 (1-0 pen, 0-1f), C Dorney 1-0, D Connolly 0-2 (0-1f), G Brennan, K Golden, B Maloney, P Lee 0-1 each.		S Connell 0-5 (0-5f), D Quinn 1-1, C Duignan (1f), N Cooper, B Courtney, B Downes 0-1 each.

Venue: Parnell Park
Referee: D Deasy
(Ballymun Kickhams)

May 16
Backdoor Round

Naomh Maur	1-07 - 0-12	O'Tooles
		P.O'Donoghue (0-1), D. Mooney (0-1), D. Farrelly (0-7; 0-5 frees), P. Bradshaw (0-1), D. Graham (0-2; free and 45).

Venue: Edenmore
Referee: TBA
TBA

May 16
Backdoor Round

Ballymun Kickhams	1-13 - 2-07	Thomas Davis
Derek Byrne 0-6 (0-3f), A Hubbard 1-0, D Rock 0-3 (0-1f), E Reilly 0-2, K Connolly, K Leahy 0-1 each.		P OConnor 0-5 (0-4f), E Behan 1-1, C Farrelly 1-0, S McGrath 0-1.

Venue: O'Toole Park
Referee: P Kiernan
(Nh Olaf)

May 14
Backdoor Round

Lucan Sarsfields	2-13 - 0-09	St Marks
B Gallagher 1-4 (1-0 pen), J Doyle 1-3 (0-1f), J O’Neill 0-2, D Quinn (0-1f), D Herlihy, P Callaghan, T Brennan 0-1 each.		C Donohoe 0-4 (0-2f), S McCann 0-3, S Cowap, P Murphy 0-1 each.

Venue: Kiltipper Road
Referee: K Tighe
(St Annes)

== Third round ==
The third round will be contested by the teams that won their respective backdoor games and the teams who lost their second round games. The winners of the third round progress to the last sixteen of the Dublin football championship. The teams taking part are UCD, Clontarf, St Marks, Parnells, St Brigids, Na Fianna, Raheny, Naomh Maur, Thomas Davis, Ballyboden St Endas, Erins Isle and Ballinteer St Johns.

August 18
Third Round

Kilmacud Crokes	1-16 - 0-08	Na Fianna
L Og O hEineachain 0-5, B Kavannagh 0-4 (1f), D Kelleher 1-1, M Vaughan 0-3, N Corkery, A Morrissey, R Cosgrove 0-1 each.		M Jarocki, B Courtney, C Deighnan (2f) 0-2 each, D Quinn, S Cloherty 0-1 each.

Venue: Panrell Park
Referee: J Harrington
(St Sylvester's)

August 20
Third Round

Clontarf	1-07 - 0-16	Raheny
C Morrissey 1-1, B Stokes, G Devine, P Delaney, S McIntyre, D Mullins, P Curran 0-1 each.		J Keogh 0-6 (0-3), C Whelan, D Ryan, G Bennett 0-2 each, C Murphy, J Ryan, D Henry, M OKeeffe 0-1 each.

Venue: ?
Referee: ?
(?)

August 19
Third Round

Ballinteer St Johns	0-05 - 4-12	St Sylvesters
C O’Donnell, J McNally (f), P McGlynn, F Ward (f), D Hopkins 0-1 each.		E Fanning 2-0, J Coughlan, E Bennis 1-1, D Clarke, A Relihan 0-3, D Kinsella, B Sexton 0-2 each.

Venue: O'Toole Park
Referee: B O'Shea
(St Marks)

August 19
Third Round

Naomh Maur	1-14 - 2-13	St Marys, Saggart
C Moore 1-3 (0-2f), C Carthy 0-3 (0-1f, 0-1 45), J Sweetman, C McGuire 0-2 each, C Reddin, R Wilde, D Byrne, M McGrath 0-1 each.		D Marshall 1-8 (0-3f), B Kelly 1-3 (0-1f), A Marshall 0-2.

Venue: Blaketown Road
Referee: G McMahon
(Kilmacud Crokes)

August 18
Third Round

Ballyboden St Endas	1-13 - 0-10	Thomas Davis
C Keaney 1-7 (0-4f), K Naughton 0-4, M Macauley, D Davey 0-1.		P O'Connor 0-4 (3f), C Farrelly 0-3, O Behan, N Brogan, J O’Reilly 0-1.

Venue: O'Toole Park
Referee: T Lambe
(St Vincents)

August 18
Third Round

St Brigids	2-14 - 1-06	Erins Isle
Mark Cahill 0-6 (0-4f), Paddy Andrews 1-1, K Darcy 0-3 (0-2f), G McIntyre 1-0, K Bonner 0-2, D Dineen, C Mullins 0-1 each.		N Crossan 1-1, N Carty 0-2 (0-2f), G O’Connell, K Dunne, P Murray (0-1f) 0-1 each.

Venue: Parnell Park
Referee: Paddy Power
(Parnells)

August 18
Third Round

UCD	1-17 - 1-14	Trinity Gaels
M Ronaldson 0-5, P Kelly 1-0, B Teehan, D St Ledger (1 ‘45’), S Redmond, R Mellon 0-2 each, S Brennan, A Murphy, T Warborn, P Brady 0-1 each.		B OBrien 0-9 (6f), R Sheridan 1-1, E McInerney 0-2, G Dillon, G Trimble 0-1 each.

Venue: Balgriffin
Referee: S Farrell
(St Pats, Donabate)

August 20
Third Round

Parnells	0-00 - 0-00	St Marks
J Peyton 0-3 (0-3f), D Rooney, N Collins (0-1f), C Parkinson 0-2, P Keogh, C Sugrue, G Collins 0-1 each.		C Donohue 0-3 (0-3f), D O’Callaghan (0-1f) 0-2, D McCann, S Tynan, S McCann, J Kelly, D Kearns, R Neville 0-1 each.

Venue: OToole Park
Referee: John Rutherford
(Ballyboden St Enda's)

== Last 16 ==
Round Towers, Clondalkin, Lucan Sarsfields, Ballymun Kickhams, St Vincents, St Judes, St Oliver Plunketts/Eoghan Ruadh, O'Tooles, Kilmacud Crokes, St Brigids, Ballyboden St Endas, UCD, St Sylvesters, St Marys, Saggart, Parnells, Raheny and Peregrines are in the last 16 of the 2009 championship. The biggest upset of the round was St Mary's of Saggart's win over 2008 All-Ireland club champions St Vincents. O'Tooles, Parnells, St Brigids, Round Towers, Clondalkin, St Peregrines, St Vincents, St Sylvesters and Raheny all exited the competition at the Last 16 stage but retain their place in the Senior Championship for 2010.

September 2
Fourth round

O'Tooles	0-06 - 1-12	UCD
D Farrelly 0-3 (0-2f), M Cunningham, M Healy, K Flynn 0-1 each.		D St Ledger 1-3 (0-2f), M Ronaldson 0-5 (0-4f), J O’Loughlin 0-2, P Brady, B Teehan 0-1 each.

Venue: Blunden Drive
Referee: Derek McKitterick
(Fingallians)

September 5
Fourth round

Ballymun Kickhams	1-11 - 1-11	Parnells
D Rock 0-6 (0-4f), Derek Byrne 1-2, J Burke, E Reilly, K Leahy 0-1 each.		J Peyton 0-5 (0-3f), N Collins 1-0, M Whelan 0-2, S Cluxton (0-1f), P Keogh, C Parkinson, G Collins 0-1 each.

Venue: Parnell Park
Referee: Andrew McAllister
(Starlights)

September 9
Fourth round Replay

Ballymun Kickhams	0-13 - 0-06	Parnells
D Rock 0-5 (0-3f), K Leahy 0-4 (0-1f), J Burke, I Robertson, J Whelan, Derek Byrne 0-1 each.		S Cluxton 0-3 (0-3f), J Collins, J Peyton, M Whelan (0-1f) 0-1 each.

Venue: Parnell Park
Referee: S Finucane
(Templeogue Synge Street)

September 3
Fourth round

St Judes	2-13 - 2-12	St Brigids
K McManamon 1-2 (0-1f), B McManamon 0-4, R Joyce 1-1, J Donnelly 0-3, S Gallagher 0-2, A Glover 0-1.		Paddy Andrews 1-2, G McIntyre 1-1, K Bonner 0-3, K Darcy (1f), Mark Cahill (2f) 0-2 each, D Dineen, D Lally 0-1 each.

Venue: Parnell Park
Referee: G McCormack
(Naomh Barróg)

September 3
Fourth round

Round Towers, Clondalkin	0-04 - 1-18	Kilmacud Crokes
J O’Brien 0-3 (0-1f), M Taylor 0-1 (0-1f).		L Óg Ó hEineachain, R Cosgrove (0-1f) 0-6 each, D Kelleher 1-1, A Morrissey 0-2, J Magee, L McBarron, R O’Carroll 0-1 each.

Venue: Parnell Park
Referee: B O'Shea
(St Mark's)

September 5
Fourth round

St Peregrines	0-05 - 2-23	Ballyboden St Endas
R McCarthy 0-2 (0-1f), S Sweeney, G Moore (0-1f), D Rooney 0-1 each.		C Keaney 0-9 (0-4f), D Davey 0-6, K Naughton 1-2, M MacAuley 0-4, S Lambert 1-0, C Smith, D O’Mahony 0-1 each.

Venue: Parnell Park
Referee: Dave Feeney
(Parnells)

September 5
Fourth round

St Vincents	1-07 - 1-10	St Mary's, Saggart
D Connolly 1-3, T Quinn 0-2 (0-1f), K Golden (0-1f), R Trainor 0-1.		B Kelly 1-3 (0-2f), D Marshall 0-5 (0-4f), C Broderick 0-2.

Venue: O'Toole Park
Referee: Seán Kavanagh
(St Brigid's)

September 2
Fourth round

St Oliver Plunketts/Eoghan Ruadh	1-14 - 1-11	St Sylvester's
B Brogan 0-6, A Brogan 1-1, G Smith 0-3 (0-3f), R McConnell, D Matthews, J Sherlock, A Moyles 0-1 each.		A Relihan 0-4 (0-1f), D Clarke 0-3 (0-2f), S Roche 1-0, B Sexton, D Kinsella (sideline), E Fanning, R Carroll 0-1 each.

Venue: Parnell Park
Referee: Thomas Quigley
(Kilmacud Crokes)

September 3
Fourth round

Lucan Sarsfields	0-18 - 0-15	Raheny
T Brennan 0-5, D Quinn (0-1f), J Doyle (0-1f) 0-3 each, J McCaffrey 0-2, P Callaghan, D Herlihy, D Gallagher, B O’Neill, A O’Neill 0-1 each.		D Ryan 0-5 (0-2f), D Henry 0-4 (0-2f), C Whelan, M O’Keeffe (0-1 ‘45’) 0-2 each, G Bennett, E Delaney 0-1 each.

Venue: Balgriffin
Referee: ?
(?)

== Quarter finals ==
UCD, Kilmacud Crokes, Lucan Sarsfields, St Judes, Ballyboden St Endas, St Marys and St Oliver Plunketts/Eoghan Ruadh have qualified for the last eight the first time of asking. The game between Ballymun Kickhams and Parnells finished all level and the replay was played at Parnell Park on Wednesday September 9. Ballymun won the replay setting them up with a quarter final game against reigning champions Kilmacud Crokes. St Mary's were the first team to qualify for the semi-finals of the Dublin Championship in a tight encounter with UCD. UCD, Ballymun Kickhams and Lucan Sarsfields were knocked out of the Dublin senior football championship at the quarter-final stage. Underdogs St Judes beat St Oliver Plunketts/Eoghan Ruadh by three points after a replay at Parnell Park on September 23.

September 18
Quarter-final

Ballyboden St Endas	2-10 - 1-10	Lucan Sarsfields
C Keaney 1-2 (0-1f), M MacAuley 1-1, D Davey 0-3, A Kerin 0-2 (0-1f), K Naughton, D O’Mahoney 0-1 each.		B Gallagher 1-1, D Quinn 0-3 (0-2f), T Brennan, J Doyle (0-1f) 0-2 each, P Callaghan, D Herlihy 0-1 each.

Venue: Parnell Park
Referee: A Allister
(Starlights)

September 17
Quarter-final

St Judes	2-08 - 0-14	St Oliver Plunketts/Eoghan Ruadh
A Glover, B Monaghan 1-0 each, K McManamon 0-3 (0-2f), J Donnelly (0-1f), D Donnelly (0-2 45) 0-2 each, C Voyles 0-1.		G Smith (0-1f), B Brogan (0-1f) 0-3 each, J Brogan, A Brogan, J Sherlock 0-2 each, R McConnell, C Dunleavy 0-1 each.

Venue: Parnell Park
Referee: Gary McCormack
(Naomh Barróg)

September 23
Quarter-final Replay

St Judes	0-13 - 0-10	St Oliver Plunketts/Eoghan Ruadh
K McManamon 0-7 (0-1f), J Donnelly (0-1f), D Donnelly (0-1f) 0-2 each, P Cunningham, A Glover 0-1 each.		B Brogan 0-5 (0-2f), A Darcy 0-2, A Brogan, G Smith, J Sherlock 0-1 each.

Venue: Parnell Park
Referee: Keith Tighe
(St Annes)

September 17
Quarter-final

St Mary's	1-08 - 0-09	UCD
D Byrne 1-1, D Marshall 0-3 (0-1f), B Kelly 0-2, S Walsh, K Kelly 0-1 each.		M Ronaldson 0-5 (0-5f), R Malone, M Smith, D McWilliams, R Mallon 0-1 each.

Venue: Parnell Park
Referee: Brian O'Shea
(St Mark's)

September 18
Quarter-final

Ballymun Kickhams	1-10 - 2-08	Kilmacud Crokes
D Rock 0-6 (0-6f), T Furman 1-1, K Leahy 0-3 (0-1f).		R Cosgrove 1-3 (0-1f), C O’Sullivan 1-0, P Griffin, B Kavanagh, P Burke, N Corkery, D Kelleher 0-1 each.

Venue: Parnell Park
Referee: T Dennehy
(Naomh Mearnóg)

== Semi finals ==
Ballyboden St Endas, Kilmacud Crokes, St Judes and St Mary's, Saggart have qualified for the semi-finals of the Dublin Senior Football Championship. All teams remaining in the competition are from South Dublin.

October 1
Semi-final

Ballyboden St Endas	0-11 - 0-11	Kilmacud Crokes
C Keaney 0-8 (0-5f, 0-1 45), M McAuley, K Naughton, A Kerin (0-f) 0-1 each.		M Vaughan 0-3 (0-2f), L Og Ó hEineachain, A Morrissey, R Cosgrove (0-1f), B Kavanagh (0-1f) 0-2 each.

Venue: Parnell Park
Referee: Dermot Deasy
(Ballymun Kickhams)

October 1
Semi-final

St Mary's, Saggart	1-07 - 0-15	St Judes
B Kelly 0-5 (4f), D McConn 1-0, D Carrigan, S Walsh 0-1 each.		R O’Brien 0-4, J Donnelly 0-3, D Donnelly (f), K McManamon (1f) 0-2 each, A Glover, B McManamon, B Monaghan, S Ryan 0-1 each.

Venue: Parnell Park
Referee: S Farrell
(St Patrick's, Donabate)

October 6
Semi-final 1st Replay

Ballyboden St Endas	1-10 - 1-10 (AET)	Kilmacud Crokes
C Keaney 0-5 (0-2f), A Kerin 0-4 (0-2f), M MacAuley 1-0, K Naughton 0-1.		M Vaughan 0-4 (0-2f, 0-1 45), C OSullivan 1-1, A Morrissey 0-2, N Corkery, P Burke, R Cosgrove 0-1 each.

Venue: Parnell Park
Referee: G McCormack
(Naomh Barróg)

October 13
Semi-final 2nd Replay

Ballyboden St Endas	0-19 - 1-12 (AET)	Kilmacud Crokes
C Keaney 0-7 (0-3f), K Naughton 0-4, A Kerin 0-3 (0-1f, 0-1 sline), S Lambert, D Nelson 0-2 each, M MacAuley 0-1.		R Cosgrove 1-3 (0-1f), M Vaughan, D Kelleher, A Morrissey 0-2 each, N Corkery, P Burke, L McBarron 0-1 each.

Venue: Parnell Park
Referee: D Feeney
(Parnells)

== Dublin Senior Football Final ==
Ballyboden St Endas	2-12 - 1-13 (final score after 60 minutes)	St Judes
Manager: Liam O'Dwyer Team: D Walsh; C Dolan; I Clarke; M O'Sullivan; D Nelson; J O'Hara; S Durkin; MD MacAuley; D. O'Mahony; S Lambert; D Davey; C Smyth; C Keaney; K Naughton; A Kerin. Substitutes: P Galvin for Davey (42), D Shovlin for Lambert (50), P OBrien for OSullivan (54).	Half-time: 1-0 - 0-07 Competition: Dublin Senior Football Championship (Final) Date: 16.00 BST; Sunday, October 18, 2009 Venue: Parnell Park, Dublin Attendance: Referee:B OShea (St Marks) Match rules: 60 minutes. Replay if scores still level. Maximum of 5 substitutions.	Manager: Padraic Monaghan Team: P Copeland; C McBride; S Breheny; C Guckian; P Cunningham; N O'Shea; S Ryan; C Murphy; A Glover; R O'Brien; B McManamon; B Monaghan; J Donnelly; D Donnelly; K McManamon Substitutes: S Gallagher for Donnelly (ht), R Joyce for O'Brien (23), M Lyons for Monaghan (46), C Voyles for B McManamon (55).
