= 2009–10 All-Ireland Senior Club Hurling Championship =

All-Ireland Senior Club Hurling Championship 2009–10

Championship Details
- Dates: 11 October 2009 – 17 March 2010
- Teams: 15

All Ireland Champions
- Winners: Ballyhale Shamrocks (5th win)
- Captain: Éamonn Walsh
- Manager: Mick Fennelly

All Ireland Runners-up
- Runners-up: Portumna
- Captain: Leo Smith
- Manager: Johnny Kelly

Provincial Champions
- Munster: Newtownshandrum
- Leinster: Ballyhale Shamrocks
- Ulster: Dunloy
- Connacht: Portumna

Championship Statistics
- Matches Played: 14
- Total Goals: 33 (2.35 per game)
- Total Points: 428 (30.57 per game)
- Top Scorer: Henry Shefflin (1–42)

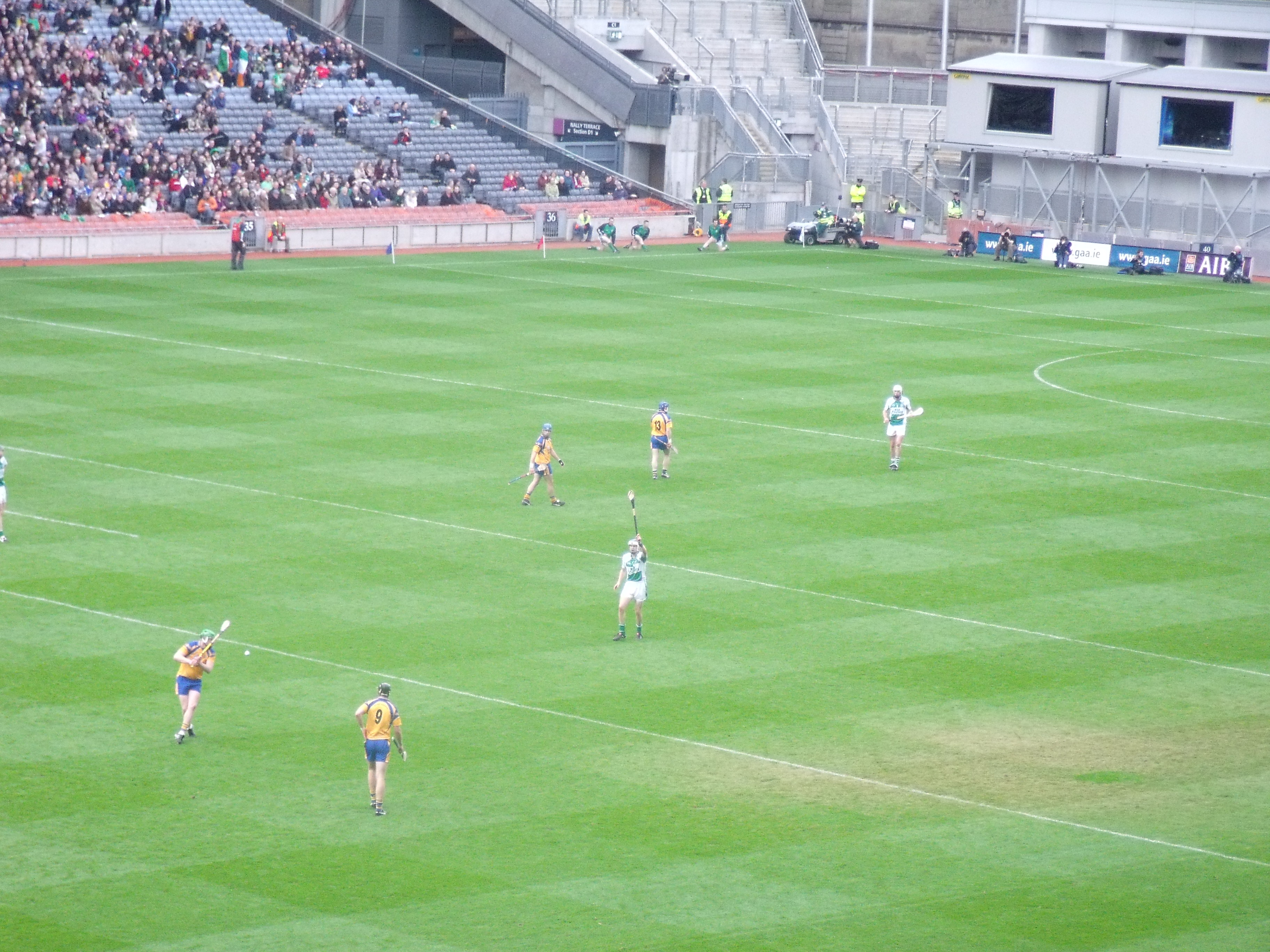
Action from the All-Ireland final between Ballyhale Shamrocks (green) and Portumna (blue and yellow); Croke Park, 17 March 2010.

The 2009–10 All-Ireland Senior Club Hurling Championship was the 40th staging of Ireland's premier inter-county club hurling competition since its establishment by the Gaelic Athletic Association in 1970–71. A total of 15 teams competed in the championship, with Ballyhale Shamrocks unseating the two-time defending champions Portumna by 1–19 to 0–17 in the final at Croke Park, Dublin. The championship began on 11 October 2009 and concluded on 17 March 2010.

== Pre-championship ==
Having secured their fifth county title since 2003, Portumna were eligible to become the first team to win 3 All-Ireland Championships in-a-row, and their fourth in five years. As such, a lot of focus was placed on the team.

Ballyhale Shamrocks were regarded as the main challengers to Portumna. They entered the competition having captured their fourth county title and were hoping to become the first club to win five All-Ireland titles. Ballyhale Shamrocks had been knocked out by Portumna in the semi-finals of the previous championship

== The championship ==
=== Participating counties ===
Team	County	Captain	Most recent success		
Team	County	Captain	All-Ireland	Provincial	County
Adare	Limerick	Donncha Sheehan			2008
Ballyboden St. Enda's	Dublin	Malachy Travers			2008
Ballycran	Down	Seán Ennis		1993	2007
Ballygunner	Waterford	Alan Kirwan		2001	2005
Ballyhale Shamrocks	Kilkenny	Éamonn Walsh	2006	2008	2008
Clonkill	Westmeath	Seán Loughlin			2007
Clough-Ballacolla	Laois	Mick McEvoy			
Cratloe	Clare	Barry Duggan			
Dunloy	Antrim	Michael McClements		2007	2007
Kevin Lynch's	Derry				2008
Newtownshandrum	Cork	Dermot Gleeson	2004	2005	2005
Oulart-the-Ballagh	Wexford	Paul Roche			2007
Portumna	Galway	Leo Smith	2009	2007	2008
Thurles Sarsfields	Tipperary	Johnny Enright			2005
Tullamore	Offaly	Shane Dooley			1964

=== Format ===
The 2009–10 club championship was run on a provincial basis as usual. It was a knockout tournament with pairings drawn at random in the respective provinces – there were no seeds.

Each match was played as a single leg. If a match was drawn there was a replay. If that match ended in a draw a period of extra time was played, however, if both sides were still level at the end of extra time another replay would take place.

Leinster Championship

Quarter-finals: (2 matches) These were two lone matches between the first four teams drawn from the province of Leinster.

Semi-finals: (2 matches) The winners of the two quarter-finals joined the other two Munster teams to make up the semi-final pairings.

Final: (1 match) The winners of the two semi-finals contested this game.

Munster Championship

Quarter-final: (1 match) This was a single match between the first two teams drawn from the province of Munster.

Semi-finals: (2 matches) The winner of the lone quarter-final joined the other three Munster teams to make up the semi-final pairings.

Final: (1 match) The winners of the two semi-finals contested this game.

Ulster Championship

Semi-finals: (1 match) This was a single match between the first two teams drawn from the province of Ulster.

Final: (1 match) The winner of the lone semi-final joined another Ulster team, who received a bye to the final, to make up the final pairings.

All-Ireland Series

Semi-finals: (2 matches) The four provincial champions contested these games.

Final: (1 match) The two semi-final winners contested the final.

== Fixtures ==
=== Ulster Senior Club Hurling Championship ===
2009-10-11
Semi-final

Ballycran	2–17 – 2–13	Kevin Lynch's
J Coyle 2–5, S Wilson 0–8 (1 '65', 0–7 frees), A Clarke 0–2, P Keith, G Savage 0–1 each.	(report)	C Herron 0–4 (0-3f), K Hinphey 0–4, L Craig, P McCloskey 1–0 each, A McCloskey, P Kelly 0–2 each, L Hinphey 0–1.

Casement Park, Belfast
Referee: D. Murphy (Wexford)

2009-10-25
Final

Dunloy	2–16 – 2–11	Ballycran
G McGhee (0-2f), S Dowds (0-5f), L Richmond (0–3), G O’Kane (0–4); A Elliott (0-1f), P Richmond (2–1).	(report)	P Keith (0–1), S Wilson (1-6f), J Coyle (0–1), C Woods (0–1), C Arthurs (0–1), A Clarke (1–0), M Braniff (0–1).

Casement Park, Belfast
Referee: G. Devlin (Armagh)

=== Leinster Senior Club Hurling Championship ===
2009-11-01
Quarter-final

Oulart-the-Ballagh	1–21 – 2–20 (AET)	Ballyhale Shamrocks
J Roche (0–1 free), L Prendergast (0–1), M Jacob (0–1); D Nolan (0–4), R Jacob (0–5), G Sinnott (0–1), N Kirwan (1–8, 0–8 frees).	(report)	TJ Reid (2–4, 0–1 free), H Shefflin (0–8, four frees), C Fennelly (0–2); P Reid (0–1), E Reid (0–3), D Hoyne (0–2).

Wexford Park, Wexford
Referee: B. Gavin (Offaly)

2009-11-01
Quarter-final

Clonkill	1–21 – 2–12	Clough-Ballacolla
Brendan Murtagh 1–9 (0–6 frees), Shane Power, Alan Dowdall, Paddy Dowdall 0–2 each, John Fagan, Andrew Mitchell, Michael Heffernan, Larry Donohue, Luke Folan, Anthony Price 0–1 each.	(report)	Damien Bergin 1–6 (0–6 frees), Willie Hyland 0–3, Kevin Keyes 1–0, Canice Coonan, Mick Dunphy, Tom Delaney 0–1 each.

Cusack Park, Mullingar
Referee: D. Murphy (Wexford)

2009-11-15
Semi-final

Clonkill	1–9 – 1–12	Tullamore
S Dooley 0–8 (7f, 1 '65); F Kerrigan 1–1; S Kelly 0–2; K Martin 0–1.	(report)	B Murtagh 1–1 (1-1f); A Mitchell (0–2 '65); P Dowdall, L Folan 0–2 each; O Price, A Price 0–1 each.

Cusack Park, Mullingar
Referee: J. Owens (Wexford)

2009-11-15
Semi-final

Ballyhale Shamrocks	4–18 – 0–18	Ballyboden St. Enda's
H Shefflin 1–6 (0-4f, 0–1 '65'), E Reid 1–3, TJ Reid 1–2, C Fennelly 1–0, J Fitzpatrick, P Reid 0–2 each, M Fennelly, D Hoyne, M Aylward 0–1 each.	(report)	P Ryan 0–8 (0-5f, 0–3 '65'), D Sweeney 0–4 (0-1sl), C Keaney 0–2, M Travers, D Curtin, N McMorrow, E Carroll 0–1 each.

Nowlan Park, Kilkenny
Referee: B. Kelly (Westmeath)

2009-11-29
Final

Tullamore	1–8 – 1–16	Ballyhale Shamrocks
S Dooley (1–4, 0-3f, 0–1 '65'), J Keane (0–1), S Kelly (0–1); G Treacy (0–1); F Kerrigan (0–1).	(report)	H Shefflin (0–6, 0-3f, 0–1 '65'), P Reid (1–0), E Reid (0–3), D Hoyne (0–2), M Fennelly (0–2); TJ Reid (0–2), C Fennelly (0–1).

O'Connor Park, Tullamore
Referee: J. Owens (Wexford)

=== Munster Senior Club Hurling Championship ===
2009-11-01
Quarter-final

Thurles Sarsfield's	1–15 – 0–19	Newtownshandrum
P. Bourke 1–5 (0–2 frees, 0–1 sideline); D. Maher 0–6; S. Ryan 0–2; J. Enright, M. Gleeson, 0–1 each.	(report)	B. O’Connor 0–8 (0–4 frees, 0–1 65, 0–1 sideline); Jerry O’Connor 0–3; C. Naughton 0–3; R. Clifford 0–2; J. Coughlan, PJ Copse, M. Bowles, 0–1 each.

Semple Stadium, Thurles
Referee: G. Hoey (Clare)

2009-11-15
Semi-final

Newtownshandrum	1–17 – 1–14	Adare
B. O’Connor 0–10 (0-8f, 0–1 65); J. O’Connor 0–3; J. Bowles 1–0; PJ Copse, R. Clifford, M. Bowles, J. Coughlan, 0–1.	(report)	D. Hannon 1–13 (1-9f); D. Sheehan 0–1.

Páirc Uí Chaoimh, Cork
Referee: P. Casey (Waterford)

2009-11-15
Semi-final

Ballygunner	1–14 – 0–15	Cratloe
P Flynn 0–5 (0-5f), B Mullane 1–0, B O'Sullivan, JJ Hutchinson, A Maloney 0–2 each, P Mahony, W Hutchinson, S Power 0–1 each.	(report)	D Browne 0–6 (0-6f), S Collins 0–5, M Oige Murphy 0–2, C McInerney, L Markham 0–1 each.

Walsh Park, Waterford
Referee: J. Sexton (Ballyhea)

2009-11-29
Final

Ballygunner	2–9 – 2–11	Newtownshandrum
P. Flynn 0–8 (all frees); S. Power 1–0; B. Mullane 1–0; B. O’Sullivan 0–1.	(report)	B. O’Connor 0–5 (0–2 frees, 0–1 65, 0–1 sideline); J. Bowles 1–0; J. Coughlan 1–0; R. Clifford 0–2; C. Naughton 0–2; PJ Copse, Jerry O’Connor, 0–1 each.

Semple Stadium, Thurles
Referee: D. O'Driscoll (Limerick)

=== All-Ireland Senior Club Hurling Championship ===
2010-02-14
Semi-final

Ballyhale Shamrocks	0–19 – 0–17	Newtownshandrum
H. Shefflin 0–13 (0–8 frees, 0–2 65’s); M. Aylward 0–2; E. Reid, TJ Reid, C. Fennelly, J. Fitzpatrick, 0–1 each.	(report)	B. O’Connor 0–9 (0–7 frees, 0–1 65, 0–1 sideline); M. Bowles 0–3; R. Clifford 0–2; Jerry O’Connor 0–2; C. Naughton 0–1.

Semple Stadium, Thurles
Referee: J. Ryan (Tipperary)

2010-02-14
Semi-final

Portumna	2–18 – 0–12	Dunloy
J Canning 1–8 (0-8f), C Ryan 1–1, A Smith 0–3, K Hayes 0–3, D Hayes 0–2, P Smith 0–1.	(report)	P Shiels 0-4f, S Dowds 0-2f, K McKeague 0–2, G O’Kane 0–1, L Richmond 0–1, P Doherty 0–1, P Richmond 0–1.

Parnell Park, Dublin
Referee: B Gavin (Offaly)

2010-03-17
Final

Ballyhale Shamrocks	1–19 – 0–17	Portumna
C Fennelly (0–2), H Shefflin (0–9), TJ Reid (0–3), E Reid (0–3), P Reid (0–1), D Hoyne (1–1).	(report)	P Smith (0–1), A Smith (0–1); D Hayes (0–2), J Canning (0–12), M Dolphin (0–1).

Croke Park, Dublin
Referee: C McAllister (Cork)

== Championship statistics ==
=== Scoring ===
- First goal of the championship: James Coyle for Ballycran against Kevin Lynch's (Ulster semi-final)
- Last goal of the championship: David Hoyne for Ballyhale Shamrocks against Portumna (All-Ireland final)
- Widest winning margin: 12 points
  - Ballyhale Shamrocks 4–18 – 0–18 Ballyboden St. Enda's (Leinster quarter-final)
  - Portumna 2–18 – 0–12 Dunloy (All-Ireland semi-final)
- Most goals by one team in a match: 4
  - Ballyhale Shamrocks 4–18 – 0–18 Ballyboden St. Enda's (Leinster quarter-final)

== Top scorers ==
=== Season ===
Rank	Player	Club	Tally	Total	Matches	Average
1	Henry Shefflin	Ballyhale Shamrocks	1–42	45	5	8.00
2	Ben O'Connor	Newtownshandrum	0–32	32	4	8.00
3	Joe Canning	Portumna	1–20	23	2	11.50
4	T. J. Reid	Ballyhale Shamrocks	3–12	21	5	4.20
5	Simon Wilson	Ballycran	1–14	17	2	8.50
6	Brendan Murtagh	Clonkill	2–10	16	2	8.00
6	Declan Hannon	Adare	1–13	16	1	16.00
7	Eoin Reid	Ballyhale Shamrocks	1–13	16	5	3.20
8	Shane Dooley	Tullamore	1–12	15	2	7.50
9	Paul Flynn	Ballygunner	0–13	13	2	6.50

=== Single game ===
Rank	Player	Club	Tally	Total	Opposition
1	Declan Hannon	Adare	1–13	16	Newtownshandrum
2	Henry Shefflin	Ballyhale Shamrocks	0–13	13	Newtownshandrum
3	Brendan Murtagh	Clonkill	1–09	12	Clough-Ballacolla
3	Joe Canning	Portumna	0–12	12	Dunloy
4	James Coyle	Ballycran	2–05	11	Kevin Lynch's
4	Nicky Kirwan	Oulart-the Ballagh	1–08	11	Ballyhale Shamrocks
4	Joe Canning	Portumna	1–08	11	Dunloy
5	Ben O'Connor	Newtownshandrum	0–10	10	Adare
6	Simon Wilson	Ballycran	1–06	9	Dunloy
6	Damien Bergin	Clough-Ballacolla	1–06	9	Clonkill
6	Henry Shefflin	Clough-Ballacolla	1–06	9	Ballyboden St. Enda's
6	Henry Shefflin	Ballyhale Shamrocks	0–09	9	Portumna
6	Ben O'Connor	Newtownshandrum	0–09	9	Ballyhale Shamrocks

== Referees ==
The following referees were used during the championship:

Name	County	Games
James Owens	Wexford	2
Dickie Murphy	Wexford	2
Brian Gavin	Offaly	2
Gerard Devlin	Armagh	1
John Sexton	Cork	1
Pat Casey	Waterford	1
Ger Hoey	Clare	1
Cathal McAllister	Cork	1
Barry Kelly	Westmeath	1
Declan O'Driscoll	Limerick	1
Johnny Ryan	Tipperary	1

== Stadia ==
The following stadia were used during the championship:

County	Stadium	Capacity
Dublin	Croke Park	82,300
Tipperary	Semple Stadium	55,000
Cork	Páirc Uí Chaoimh	43,000
Antrim	Casement Park	32,600
Westmeath	Cusack Park	15,000
Wexford	Wexford Park	25,000
Kilkenny	Nowlan Park	24,000
Offaly	O'Connor Park	20,000
Waterford	Walsh Park	17,000
Dublin	Parnell Park	13,500
