= 2015–16 All-Ireland Senior Club Football Championship =

Irish Football Championship

- Dates: 18 October 2015 – 17 March 2016
- Teams: 32
- Sponsor: Allied Irish Bank
- Champions: Ballyboden St Enda's (1st title); Darragh Nelson (captain); Andy McEntee (manager)
- Runners-up: Castlebar Mitchels; Rory Byrne (captain); Declan O'Reilly (manager); Declan Shaw (manager)

Tournament statistics
- Matches played: 31
- Top scorer(s): Andrew Kerin (2–20)

The 2015–16 All-Ireland Senior Club Football Championship was the 46th annual Gaelic football club championship since its establishment in the 1970–71 season.

The defending champion was Corofin; however, the club was knocked out by Castlebar Mitchels in the Connacht Club SFC final.

Ballyboden St Enda's defeated Castlebar Mitchels by 2–14 to 0–7 in the final at Croke Park on 17 March 2016. It was the club's first title. The winning team received the Andy Merrigan Cup.

== Connacht ==
=== Quarter-final ===
25 October 2015 Quarter-final	Corofin	1-17 - 0-07	Mohill	Tuam Stadium
	Michael Farragher 1-2; J Leonard 0-4 (4f), M Lundy 0-4; I Burke 0-3; S Monaghan 0-2; R Steede & C Cunningham 0-1 each.	Report	K Beirne 0-3 (3f), R Kennedy 0-3; D Flynn 0-1.

=== Semi-finals ===
8 November 2015 Semi-final	Castlebar Mitchels	3-08 - 0-13	Clann na nGael	McHale Park
	D Kirby (1-1); R Feeney, B Moran (1-0 each); E O’Reilly (0-2f); N Douglas (1f), P Durcan, S Hopkins, J Durkan, C Costello (0-1 each).	Report	D Shine (0-9, 8 frees); U Harney (0-2); J Fahy, C Shine (0-1f each).

8 November 2015 Semi-final	Corofin	4-14 - 2-06	St Mary's	Tuam Stadium
	Martin Farragher 3-2 (1f), M Lundy 1-3 (1-0 pen), I Burke 0-4, R Steede 0-2, J Leonard, L Silke and G Sice (1f) 0-1 each.	Report	R Guinan 1-2 (2f), K Cawley 1-0, M Breheny 0-2 (2f), D Kilgallon and C Egan 0-1 each.

=== Final ===
22 November 2015 Final	Castlebar Mitchels	2-10 - 0-11	Corofin	Tuam Stadium
	N Douglas 1-3 (1f), B Moran 1-2, S Hopkins 0-1, R Feeney 0-1, N Lydon 0-1, S Keane 0-1, E O’Reilly 0-1 (f).	Report	Martin Farragher 0-4 (2fs), G Sice 0-3 (3fs), I Burke 0-1, R Steede 0-1, K Fitzgerald 0-1, D Wall 0-1.

== Leinster ==
=== First round ===
25 October 2015 First round	Palatine	1-08 - 0-15	Portlaoise	Dr Cullen Park
	D Reid (2f), B Kelly (3f) 0-3 each, S O'Neill 1-0, J Kenny, S Reilly 0-1 each.	Report	P Cahillane 0-5 (4f), B McCormack 0-3, C Rogers 0-2 (1f), C Healy, G Dillon, B Glynn, D Cullen, R Maher 0-1 each.

25 October 2015 First round	Killoe Young Emmets	5-11 - 1-04	St James'	Pearse Park
	M Hughes 2-1, S McCormack 1-2, D McGoldrick 1-1, M Quinn 0-3, L Moran 1-0, P Kiernan 0-2, D Mimnagh & S Kiernan 0-1 each.	Report	A Parle 1-1 (1f), K O'Grady 0-2 (2f), M O'Hanlon 0-1 (1f).

25 October 2015 First round	Edenderry	0-11 - 0-12	Rathnew	O'Connor Park
	S Doyle 0-7; A McDonell 0-2; S Guing and S Moriarity 0-1 each.	Report	E Doyle 0-4; J Merrigan 0-2; L Glynn, R O'Brien, N Mernagh, T Smyth, G Merrigan and E Glynn 0-1 each.

=== Quarter-finals ===
8 November 2015 Quarter-final	Portlaoise	2-05 - 0-10	Sarsfields	O'Moore Park
	P Cahillane 1-1, C Rogers 1-0 (pen), G Dillon 0-2, B Smith, B McCormack 0-1 each.	Report	R Cahill 0-5 (4f), S Dempsey 0-3, S Campbell, D Nea 0-1 each.

8 November 2015 Quarter-final	Killoe Young Emmets	0-11 - 1-06	Navan O'Mahony's
	S McCormack (0-4, 2f), D McGoldrick (0-3, 3f), S Kiernan (0-2); J McCormack (0-1), M Quinn (0-1).	Report	Ruairi Ó Coileáin (1-3, 3f), S Gillespie (0-2), C McGuinness (0-1).

8 November 2015 Quarter-final	Rathnew	1-06 - 2-10	St Loman's	O'Connor Park
	J Merrigan (4f) 0-04; J Stafford 1-00; R O'Brien, N Mernagh 0-1 each.	Report	J Heslin (4f) 0-4; A Gaffney, D Windsor 1-00 each; K Reilly 0-2; P Sharry (1 45), K Lynam, K Casey, S Dempsey 0-1 each.

8 November 2015 Quarter-final	St Patrick's	0-07 - 1-08	Ballyboden St Enda's	Drogheda Park
	P Keenan (0-4, 3f), K White (0-2, 1f), D O’Connor (0-1).	Report	A Kerin (0-5 4f), C Basquel (1-00), C Keaney (0-3).

=== Semi-finals ===
22 November 2015 Semi-final	Portlaoise	5-12 - 0-11	Killoe Young Emmets	O'Moore Park
	B Smith 1-0, B Fitzgerald 0-3f, B McCormack, A Kelly 0-2 each, C Healy, C Boyle, B Glynn, P Cahillane (f) 0-1 each.	Report	D McGoldrick, S Kiernan 1-0 each, R McGoldrick 0-2, D Mimnagh, M Hughes, S McCormack (f) 0-1 each.

22 November 2015 Semi-final	St Loman's	0-09 - 1-11	Ballyboden St Enda's	Cusack Park
	J Heslin 0-7 (6f), P Sharry and K Casey 0-1 each.	Report	S Molony 1-1, A Kerin (3f) and C Keaney (4f) 0-4 each, C Basquel and MD Macauley 0-1 each.

=== Final ===
6 December 2015 Final	Ballyboden St Enda's	2-09 - 1-11	Portlaoise	O'Connor Park
	A Kerin 1-2, C Keaney 0-4 (4f), MD Macauley 1-0, S Molony, C Basquel, A Waters 0-1 each.	Report	P Cahillane 1-2 (2f), B McCormack, B Smith, C Rogers (1f) 0-2 each, E Whelan, B Glynn, C Healy 0-1 each.

== Munster ==
=== Quarter-finals ===
1 November 2015 Quarter-final	Clonmel Commercials	0-12 - 1-07	Newcastle West	Ned Hall Park
	I Barnes 0-4 (2f), S Kennedy 0-3, M Quinlivan 0-2 (1 45), A Matassa, J Lonergan & P Looram 0-1 each.	Report	J Lee 1-2 (0-2f), S Kelly 0-3 (2f), I Corbett & S Brosnan 0-1 each.

7 November 2015 Quarter-final	Stradbally	0-05 - 1-13	Nemo Rangers	Fraher Field
	T Grey, J Hearn, M Sweeney, R Aherne, S Keane (0-1.	Report	J Masters (1-5, 2 frees); P Kerrigan (1 free), C Horgan (0-2 each); C O’Brien, A O’Donovan, W Morgan, D Mehigan (0-1).

=== Semi-finals ===
15 November 2015 Semi-final	Clonmel Commercials	1-13 - 0-03	Milltown Malbay	Ned Hall Park
	M Quinlivan (1-3, 0-1 free); J Longeran (0-3); P White (0-1 free), J Kennedy (0-2 each); I Fahey (0-1 ’45), I Barnes (0-1 free), S Kennedy (0-1 each).	Report	E Cleary, K Malone, S Malone (0-1 each).

15 November 2015 Semi-final	Nemo Rangers	0-14 - 0-08	Killarney Legion	Páirc Uí Rinn
	L Connolly (0-4, 2 frees, 1 45), P Kerrigan (0-3), B O’Driscoll (0-3, frees), A Cronin, K Fulignati, A O’Donovan, S Martin (0-1 each).	Report	J O’Donoghue (0-3, 1 free), T Moriarty (0-3), D Lyne, C Keane (0-1 each).

=== Final ===
29 November 2015 Final	Clonmel Commercials	1-07 - 0-09	Nemo Rangers	Mallow GAA Complex
	M Quinlivan 1-3 (0-2 45, 0-1 free), J Kennedy, A Matassa, K Harney, J Lonergan 0-1 each.	Report	P Kerrigan 0-3, J Masters 0-2 (0-1 free), J Horgan, D Niblock, L Connolly (0-1 free), D O’Donovan 0-1 each.

== Ulster ==
=== Preliminary round ===
18 October 2015 Preliminary round	Slaughtneil	4-13 - 1-04	Derrygonnelly Harps	Owenbeg
	C Bradley (2-3, 0-1f), C O'Doherty (1-2), K McKaigue (1-0); Paul Bradley (0-3, 2f), S McGuigan (0-1), C McKaigue (0-1), B McGuigan (0-1); Patsy Bradley (0-1), P Kelly (0-1).	Report	P Ward (1-1), Jones (0-2f), D Cassidy (0-1).

=== Quarter-finals ===
1 November 2015 Quarter-final	Crossmaglen Rangers	2-15 - 0-13	Erin's Own	Athletic Grounds
	J Hanratty (1-1), T Kernan (0-4); J Murtagh (1-0), A Kernan (0-3); O O'Neill (0-3), M McNamee (0-2), S Kernan (0-2).	Report	M Magill (0-5), C Close (0-3), P McCann (0-2), T McCann (0-2), T Scullion (0-1).

1 November 2015 Quarter-final	Kingscourt Stars	0-05 - 3-15	Kilcoo	Breffni Park
	B Reilly 0-3 (1f), C McArdle 0-2 (2fs).	Report	D O'Hanlon (3fs), C Laverty 0-5 each, P Devlin, J Johnston 1-2 each, P Greenan 1-0, D Kane 0-1.

1 November 2015 Quarter-final	Naomh Conaill	1-11 - 2-09	Trillick St Macartan's	MacCumhaill Park
	D Gallagher 0-5 (4fs), C Thompson 1-0, B McDyer 0-2, L Thompson, D Molloy (f), J McLoone, J O'Malley (f) 0-1 each	Report	N Gormley 1-2, L Brennan 0-4 (2fs), D Gallagher 1-0, R Donnelly 0-2, M Donnelly 0-1.

1 November 2015 Quarter-final	Scotstown	1-15 - 0-15	Slaughtneil	St Tiernach's Park
	D Hughes 1-4, C McCarthy 0-5 (3f), R Beggan 0-2 (f,’45), O Heaphey 0-2, S Carey 0-2 (2f).	Report	Paul Bradley 0-7 (6f), C Bradley 0-4 (1f), Shane McGuigan 0-2, R Bradley 0-1, Se McGuigan 0-1.

=== Semi-finals ===
15 November 2015 Semi-final	Kilcoo	0-08 - 0-12	Crossmaglen Rangers	Páirc Esler
	D O'Hanlon 0-5 (4fs), M Devlin, J Johnston, R Johnston all 0-1 each.	Report	A Kernan (2fs), T Kernan (3fs) Carragher 0-3 each, O O'Neill, R Kelly, P Hughes 0-1 each.

15 November 2015 Semi-final	Scotstown	2-09 - 2-07	Trillick St Macartan's	Brewster Park
	D Hughes 2-2, S Carey (2f), R Beggan (2f), O Heaphey 0-2 each, C McCarthy 0-1.	Report	N Gormley 1-1, D McDonnell 1-0, E Gormley 0-2, L Brennan (f), D Gallagher, R Donnelly, N Donnelly 0-1 each.

=== Final ===
29 November 2015 Final	Crossmaglen Rangers	2-17 - 2-12 (aet)	Scotstown	Athletic Grounds
	T Kernan (1-6, 0-5f); K Carragher (1-2); J Murtagh (0-3); M McNamee, S Kernan, C Cumiskey, D McKenna, P Studard, A Kernan (1f) (0-1 each).		S Carey (0-6, 5f); D Hughes, B McGinnity (1-0 each); C McCarthy (0-2, 1f); R Beggan (45), O Heaphey, D Morgan, E Caulfield (0-1).

== Quarter-final ==
12 December 2015 Quarter-final	Tir Chonaill Gaels	0-09 - 2-12	Clonmel Commercials	Emerald GAA Grounds
13:30	A Hanlon, S Friel, L Gavaghan 0-2 each, M McCoy, M Gottsche, C McGee 0-1 each.	Report	I Fahey 1-1, J Lonergan, P White 0-3 each, P Looram 1-0, M Quinlivan, I Barnes, S Kennedy, J Kennedy, N Kelly 0-1 each.	Referee: Paddy Neilan (Roscommon)

== Semi-finals ==
13 February 2016 Semi-final	Castlebar Mitchels	0-13 - 0-12	Crossmaglen Rangers	Breffni Park
6:30pm	N Douglas 0-6 (6f), P Durcan 0-3, B Moran 0-2, N Lydon & D Kirby 0-1 each.	Report	J Clarke 0-4, T Kernan (2f), S Kernan & O O’Neill (1f) 0-2 each, C Cumiskey & A Kernan (1f) 0-1 each	Referee: Eddie Kinsella (Laois)

13 February 2016 Semi-final	Ballyboden St Enda's	0-15 - 0-10 (aet)	Clonmel Commercials	O'Moore Park
4:00 pm	A Kerin 0-7 (0-5f), C Keaney 0-4 (0-3f), S Molony, C Basquel, D Nelson & R Basquel 0-1 each.	Report	I Barnes 0-3 (0-2f), J Kennedy 0-2, M Quinlivan 0-2 (0-1f), J Lonergan 0-2, K Harney 0-1.	Referee: Barry Cassidy (Derry)

== Final ==
17 March 2016 Final	Castlebar Mitchels	0-07 - 2-14	Ballyboden St Enda's	Croke Park
4:00 pm	N Douglas (0-1 ’45), A Walsh (0-2f) 0-2 each, J Durcan, N Lydon, P Durcan 0-1 each.	Report	A Kerin 1-2 (1-0 pen), C Basquel 1-1, B Dwan 0-3, R Basquel, S Durkin 0-2 each, S O’Connor, D O’Reilly, C Keaney, MD MacAuley 0-1 each.	Attendance: 31,518; Referee: Conor Lane (Cork)

Daragh Nelson was the winning captain, while Bob Dwan claimed the man of the match award.

== Finalists ==
Ballyboden St Enda's – 2016 All-Ireland Senior Club Football Champions (1st title)

Andy McEntee managed the winning team, with Paul Waters as coach.

1. Paul Durcan
2. Bob Dwan
3. Stephen Hiney
4. Shane Clayton
5. Stephen O'Connor
6. Darragh Nelson
7. Shane Durkin
8. M. D. MacAuley
9. Aran Waters
10. Darren O'Reilly
11. Colm Basquel
12. Robbie McDaid
13. Ryan Basquel
14. Conal Keaney
15. Andrew Kerin

Subs used

22 Simon Lambert for M. D. MacAuley
13 Sam Molony for R. Basquel
12 Daniel Davey for D. O'Reilly
20 Donogh McCabe for A. Waters
25 Seán Gibbons for R. McDaid

== Statistics ==
=== Top scorers ===
Overall

Rank	Player	Club	Tally	Total	Matches	Average
1	Andrew Kerin	Ballyboden St Enda's	2-20	26	5	5.20
2	Darren Hughes	Scotstown	4-06	18	3	6.00
2	Tony Kernan	Crossmaglen Rangers	1-15	18	4	4.50
3	Michael Quinlivan	Clonmel Commercials	2-11	17	5	3.40
4	Conal Keaney	Ballyboden St Enda's	0-16	16	5	3.20
5	Martin Farragher	Corofin	3-06	15	3	5.00
5	Paul Cahillane	Portlaoise	2-09	15	4	3.75
5	Neil Douglas	Castlebar Mitchels	1-12	15	4	3.75
6	Chrissy Bradley	Slaughtneil	2-07	13	2	6.50
7	John Heslin	St Loman's	0-11	11	2	5.50

In a single game

Rank	Player	Club	Tally	Total	Opposition
1	Martin Farragher	Corofin	3-02	11	St Mary's
2	Chrissy Bradley	Slaughtneil	2-03	9	Derrygonnelly Harps
2	Tony Kernan	Crossmaglen Rangers	1-06	9	Scotstown
2	Donie Shine	Clann na nGael	0-09	9	Castlebar Mitchels
3	Darren Hughes	Scotstown	2-02	8	Trillick St Macartan's
3	James Masters	Nemo Rangers	1-05	8	Stradbally
4	Mark Hughes	Killoe Young Emmets	2-01	7	St James'
4	Darren Hughes	Scotstown	1-04	7	Slaughtneil
4	Seán Doyle	Edenderry	0-07	7	Rathnew
4	John Heslin	St Loman's	0-07	7	Ballyboden St Enda's
4	Paul Bradley	Slaughtneil	0-07	7	Scotstown
4	Andrew Kerin	Ballyboden St Enda's	0-07	7	Clonmel Commercials

=== Miscellaneous ===
- On Monday 9 November 2015, Killarney Legion were chosen to represent Kerry in the Munster Championship even though they had not won the county championship at that time. This ruling by the Kerry County Board appears to be in breach of Rule 6.24(a) of the GAA official guide. The Kerry S.F.C. final ended in a draw the day before, meaning that the replay would have to be held on Saturday 14 November, in time for the Munster Semi-Final on Sunday 15th. Because of this, the Kerry County Board decided that Killarney Legion would represent Kerry regardless of whether they beat South Kerry or not in the replay, which was put back to Sunday 22 November (South Kerry can't represent Kerry in the provincial championship as they are a divisional side). This meant that Dingle, the Kerry club champions, were not permitted to represent Kerry in the Munster championship as they normally would if Killarney Legion had lost the county final.
