= Darragh Nelson =

Irish Gaelic footballer (1990–2026)

Personal information
- Native name: Darragh Ó Néill (Irish)
- Born: 1990 Dublin, Ireland
- Died: 8 October 2026 (aged 36) Dublin, Ireland
- Occupation: Account manager

Sport
- Sport: Gaelic football
- Position: Centre-back
Club
- Years: Club
- Ballyboden St Enda's
Club titles
- Dublin titles: 3
- Leinster titles: 2
- All-Ireland Titles: 1
College
- Years: College
- 2009-2013: Dublin Institute of Technology
College titles
- Fitzgibbon titles: 0
Inter-county
- Years: County
- 2010–2014: Dublin
Inter-county titles
- Leinster titles: 2
- All-Irelands: 2
- NFL: 2
- All Stars: 0

Darragh Nelson (1990 – 8 October 2026) was an Irish Gaelic footballer. At club level he played with Ballyboden St Enda's and at inter-county level with the Dublin senior football team.

== Career ==
Born and raised in Ballyroan, Dublin, Nelson attended Coláiste Éanna where he played both Gaelic football and hurling. He later studied at the Dublin Institute of Technology and won an All-Ireland Freshers' SAFC title in 2010.

At club level, Nelson first played with Ballyboden St Enda's at juvenile and underage levels before progressing to adult level. He won three Dublin SFC medals and two Leinster Club SFC medals between 2009 and 2019. Nelson captained Ballyboden St Enda's to a 2–14 to 0–07 win over Castlebar Mitchels in the 2016 All-Ireland Club SFC final.

Nelson first appeared on the inter-county scene for Dublin as a member of the minor team in 2008. He progressed to under-21 level and was part of the Dublin team that beat Donegal to win the All-Ireland U21FC title in 2010. By that stage, Nelson had already appeared for the senior team in the pre-season O'Byrne Cup competition. He was part of Dublin's extended panel when the team won All-Ireland SFC titles in 2011 and 2013.

== Death ==
Nelson died from sarcoma on 8 October 2026, at the age of 36.

== Honours ==
Dublin Institute of Technology

- All-Ireland Freshers' A Football Championship (1): 2010

Ballyboden St Enda's

- All-Ireland Senior Club Football Championship (1): 2016 (c)
- Leinster Senior Club Football Championship (2): 2015 (c), 2019
- Dublin Senior Football Championship (3): 2009, 2015 (c), 2019

Dublin

- All-Ireland Senior Football Championship (2): 2011, 2013
- Leinster Senior Football Championship (2): 2011, 2013
- National Football League (2): 2013, 2014
- All-Ireland Under-21 Football Championship (1): 2010
- Leinster Under-21 Football Championship (1): 2010
