= Conor McCormack =

Conor McCormack may refer to:

- Conor McCormack (hurler)
- Conor McCormack (footballer)
