= Simon Lambert =

Simon Lambert may refer to:

- Simon Lambert (hurler), hurling player for Dublin and Ballyboden
- Simon Lambert (speedway rider) (born 1989), British speedway rider
- Simon Lambert (ice hockey)
