= McManamon =

McManamon is a surname. Notable people with the surname include:

- Brendan McManamon (born 1982), Irish Gaelic footballer
- Colm McManamon, Gaelic footballer
- James Emmett McManamon (1905-1954), American politician
- Kevin McManamon (born 1986), Irish Gaelic footballer
- Matt McManamon, English singer-songwriter and guitarist
- Paul F. McManamon (born 1946), American scientist
