= Robbie McDaid =

Irish gaelic footballer (born 1993)

Personal information
- Born: 1993 (age 32–33) Dublin, Ireland
- Occupation: Secondary school teacher
- Height: 6 ft 2 in (188 cm)

Sport
- Sport: Gaelic football
- Position: Left wing-back
Club
- Years: Club
- Ballyboden St Enda's
Club titles
- Dublin titles: 2
- Leinster titles: 2
- All-Ireland Titles: 1
College
- Years: College
- University College Dublin
College titles
- Sigerson titles: 1
Inter-county
- Years: County
- 2015–2022: Dublin
Inter-county titles
- Leinster titles: 5
- All-Irelands: 3
- NFL: 2
- All Stars: 0

Robert McDaid (born 1993) is an Irish Gaelic footballer who plays for Dublin SFC club Ballyboden St Enda's and at inter-county level with the Dublin senior football team. He usually lines out as a defender.

== Career ==
McDaid played Gaelic football at juvenile and underage levels with the Ballyboden St Enda's club. He eventually progressed onto the club's senior team and was selected at right wing-back when Ballyboden beat Castlebar Mitchels in the 2016 All-Ireland club final. McDaid first appeared on the inter-county scene as captain of the Dublin minor football team that lost the 2011 All-Ireland minor final to Tipperary. He later won an All-Ireland U21 Championship title in 2014. McDaid was drafted onto the Dublin senior football team in 2015, however, he remained a member of the extended panel for a number of seasons. He won two All-Ireland Championship titles as a non-playing substitute in 2016 and 2019, before claiming his first winners' medal on the field of play in 2020. McDaid has also won five Leinster Championships and two National League titles.

== Honours ==
University College Dublin

- Sigerson Cup: 2016

Ballyboden St. Enda's

- All-Ireland Senior Club Football Championship: 2016
- Leinster Senior Club Football Championship: 2016, 2019
- Dublin Senior Football Championship: 2015, 2019

Dublin

- All-Ireland Senior Football Championship: 2015, 2016, 2020
- Leinster Senior Football Championship: 2015, 2016, 2020, 2021
- National Football League: 2015, 2021
- All-Ireland Under-21 Football Championship: 2014
- Leinster Under-21 Football Championship: 2014
- Leinster Minor Football Championship: 2011 (c)

Sporting positions
Preceded by	Dublin minor football team captain 2011	Succeeded by David Byrne
