= Michael Darragh MacAuley =

Dublin Gaelic footballer

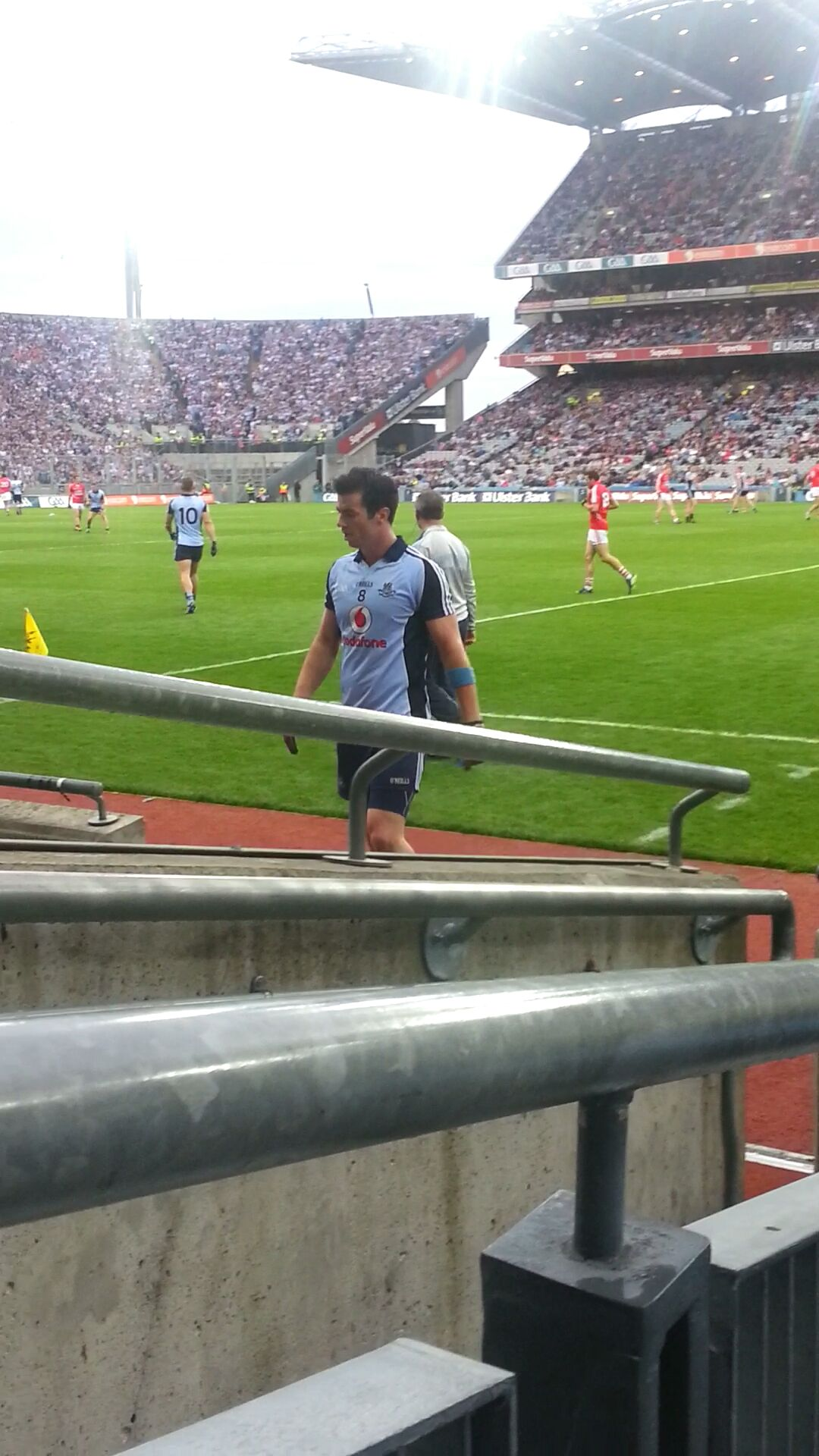

Personal information
- Native name: Micheál Darragh Mac Amhalghaidh (Irish)
- Nicknames: MDMA, Mick
- Born: 21 August 1986 (age 40) Dublin, Ireland
- Occupations: CEO, Sanctuary Runners
- Height: 1.90 m (6 ft 3 in)

Sport
- Sport: Gaelic Football
- Position: Midfield
Club
- Years: Club
- Ballyboden St Enda's
Club titles
- Dublin titles: 3
- Leinster titles: 2
- All-Ireland Titles: 1
College(s)
- Years: College
- Froebel College of Education; Maynooth University
Inter-county*
Years	County	Apps (scores)
2010–2021	Dublin	27 (2-06)
Inter-county titles
- Leinster titles: 10
- All-Irelands: 8
- NFL: 5
- All Stars: 1
- *Inter County team apps and scores correct as of 21 January 2021.

Michael Darragh MacAuley is a Gaelic footballer who plays club football for Ballyboden St Enda's. He played at inter-county level for the Dublin county team from 2010 until 2020, winning eight All-Ireland medals.

With Ballyboden St Enda's, he won the 2016 All-Ireland Senior Club Football Championship. He also won the Dublin Senior Football championship (2009, 2015) and the Leinster Senior Football Club championship (2015). MacAuley was the 2013 GAA/GPA Footballer of the Year.

In 2024, MacAuley took up the position of CEO at Sanctuary Runners, Ireland.

== Playing career ==
=== Club ===
MacAuley plays his club football with Ballyboden St Enda's, with whom he won the Dublin Senior Football Championship in 2009.

=== Inter-county ===
MacAuley made his senior football debut for Dublin against Wexford in the first round of the O'Byrne Cup; he scored a point on his debut. McAuley made his debut in the league against the 2009 All-Ireland Champions Kerry. He scored a decisive point in the game which assured the win for Dublin against Kerry.

MacAuley made his Championship debut as a substitute against Wexford in the 2010 Leinster Senior Football Championship. He made his second appearance against Meath in the semi-final of the Leinster football championship, a game in which Dublin were easily beaten by the Royals. MacAuley had his first start for Dublin against Tipperary in a second round qualifier for the All-Ireland Championship. He scored his first Championship goal and point in a game in which he finished with 1-01 of the final score of 1–21 to 1–13 at Croke Park. MacAuley scored a point in Dublin's eventual exit from that season's All-Ireland Championship at the semi-final stage.

MacAuley won his first All-Ireland Senior Football Championship in September 2011, when Dublin beat Kerry at Croke Park. He wasn't surprised by the comeback nature of the game, saying: "We had been down before in matches. It wasn't the first time we were down. We actually had a training game the week before when the As played the Bs and it was a very similar situation". His second All-Ireland title came against Mayo in 2013, as did the GAA/GPA Footballer of the Year, when he succeeded Karl Lacey to the title.

On 21 January 2021, MacAuley announced his retirement from inter-county football.

== Personal life ==
After retiring from playing inter county football he visited Hikkaduwa - a surfing town on the south coast of Sri Lanka. During the Gaza war he and David Hickey formed a group called Dublin Footballers Support Palestine to advocate for Palestinians and to put pressure on the Irish Government to take a stronger stance against Israeli human rights abuses.

== Honours ==
=== Team ===
==== Dublin ====
- All-Ireland Senior Football Championship (8): 2011, 2013, 2015, 2016, 2017, 2018, 2019, 2020
- Leinster Senior Football Championship (10): 2011, 2012, 2013, 2014, 2015, 2016, 2017, 2018, 2019, 2020
- National Football League (5): 2013, 2014, 2015, 2016, 2018
- O'Byrne Cup (1): 2015

==== Ballyboden St Enda's ====
- All-Ireland Senior Club Football Championship (1): 2016
- Leinster Senior Club Football Championship (2): 2015, 2019
- Dublin Senior Football Championship (3): 2009, 2015, 2019

=== Individual ===
- All Star Awards (2): 2011, 2013
- The Sunday Game Player of the Year (1): 2013
- GAA/GPA Footballer of the Year (1): 2013
