= Ciarán Maher =

Irish Gaelic footballer

Personal information
- Native name: Ciarán Ó Meachair (Irish)
- Born: 1962 Knocklyon, Dublin, Ireland
- Died: 10 December 2012 (aged 50) Marshfield, Massachusetts, United States
- Occupation: Business owner

Sport
- Sport: Gaelic football
- Position: Right corner-forward
Clubs
- Years: Club
- Ballyboden St Enda's; Shannon Blues
Club titles
- Boston titles: 3
Inter-county
- Years: County
- 1983-1984: Dublin
Inter-county titles
- Leinster titles: 0
- All-Irelands: 1
- NFL: 0
- All Stars: 0

Ciarán Maher (1962 - 10 December 2012) was an Irish Gaelic footballer who played as a right corner-forward at senior level for the Dublin county team.

Maher made his first appearance for the team during the 1983 championship and was a regular member of the extended panel for just two seasons. During that time he won one All-Ireland medal on the field of play.

At club level Maher was a three-time county club championship medalist with Shannon Blues in Boston. He began his club career with Ballyboden St Enda's.
