= Conor Dooley =

Irish hurler

Personal information
- Native name: Conchur Ó Dúlaoich (Irish)
- Born: 28 July 1993 (age 33) Dublin, Ireland

Sport
- Sport: Hurling
- Position: Goalkeeper
Club
- Years: Club
- 2013–: Ballyboden St Enda's
Club titles
- Dublin titles: 1
Inter-county
Years	County	Apps (scores)
2015–2017	Dublin	2 (0-0)

Conor Dooley (born 28 July 1993) is an Irish hurler who plays as a forward for Ballyboden St Enda's and formerly as a goalkeeper for the Dublin county hurling team.
