= Conor McCormack (hurler) =

Irish hurler

Personal information
- Native name: Conchúir Mac Cormaic (Irish)
- Born: 2 August 1987 (age 39) Dublin, Ireland
- Height: 1.8 m (5 ft 11 in)

Sport
- Sport: Hurling
- Position: Right Half Forward
Club
- Years: Club
- 2005–: Ballyboden St Enda's
Club titles
- Dublin titles: 6
Inter-county
- Years: County
- 2009–2014: Dublin
Inter-county titles
- Leinster titles: 1
- All-Irelands: 0
- NHL: 1
- All Stars: 0

Conor McCormack (born 2 August 1987) is a hurler with Ballyboden St Enda's and formerly with the Dublin senior hurling team. He won five Dublin Senior Hurling Championship medals with Ballyboden St. Enda's, as well as two medals at U21 and underage. A former goalkeeper until the age of 23, he later moved into a role in the forward line. After a number of Blue Star awards, he was afforded a place in the Dublin senior hurling squad. He was goalkeeper with the Leinster winning minor side captained by Johnny McCaffrey. He went on to win two Blue Star awards, a Walsh Cup, two National League Medals, and a Leinster Minor title (in goal). He also has a number of club medals with Ballyboden St Enda's, including five SHC's and several league medals. He studied at Dublin Institute of Technology.
