= Malachy Travers =

Irish hurler

Personal information
- Born: Wexford, Ireland
- Height: 1.7 m (5 ft 7 in)

Sport
- Sport: Hurling
- Position: Right half back
Clubs
- Years: Club
- Naomh Éanna; Ballyboden St Enda's
Club titles
- Wexford titles: 6
Inter-county
- Years: County
- 2003-2011: Wexford

Malachy Travers is an Irish hurler who plays for the Ballyboden St Enda's club and for the Wexford county team. Mal won his first Dublin Senior Hurling Championship medal with Ballyboden in October 2007, his second in November 2008 and his third in 2009 when he also captained the team to the League and Championship double. He won further titles in 2010 and 2011. He missed most of the 2012 season with injuries.

He retired from inter-county hurling in early 2014.
