= Conal Keaney =

Irish footballer and hurler (born 1982)

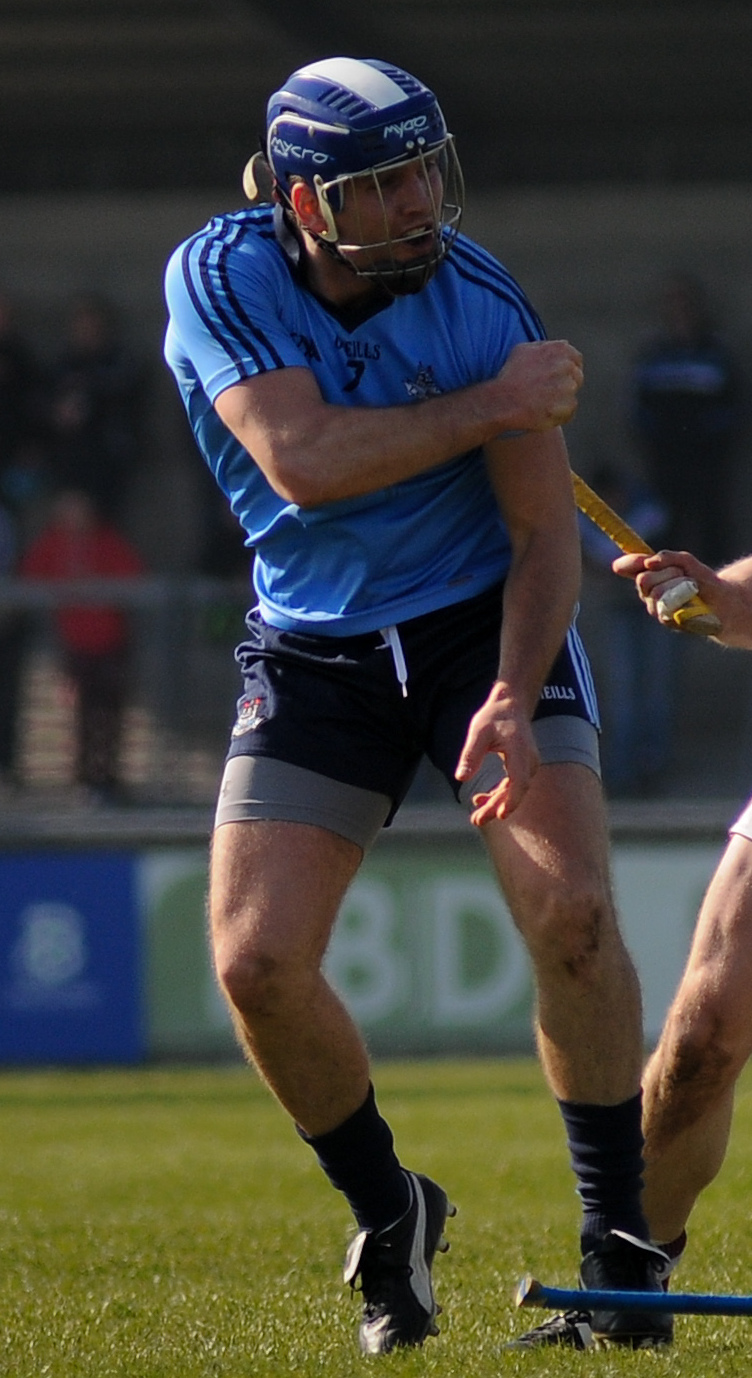
- Keaney in 2015

Personal information
- Native name: Conal Ó Cianaigh (Irish)
- Born: 24 September 1982 (age 44) Dublin, Ireland
- Height: 1.87 m (6 ft 2 in)

Sport
- Position: Full Forward
Club
- Years: Club
- 2000–: Ballyboden St Enda's
Club titles
	Football	Hurling
Dublin titles	2	5
Leinster titles	1	0
All-Ireland titles	1	0
Inter-county
Years	County	Apps (scores)
2001–2003 2004–2010 2011–2016 & 2017-2020	Dublin (H); Dublin (F); Dublin (H)	12 (0-15) 22 (1-26)
Inter-county titles
	Football	Hurling
Leinster Titles	5	1
League titles	0	1

Conal Keaney (born 24 September 1982) is an Irish footballer and hurler who played for Dublin and Ballyboden St Enda's. He was educated at Terenure College.

== Football career ==
He was part of the Dublin side that won the All-Ireland Under-21 Football Championship in 2003. He made his senior debut for Dublin Football during the 2005 NFL campaign. Keaney was announced in the International Rules team to play in Australia but had to opt out due to an ankle injury. In first full term as a Dublin football player in 2005, he was part of the Dublin team that won the Leinster Senior Football Championship against Laois. He opted out of the football team in 2011 to rejoin the hurling team.

=== 2006 ===
Despite a late return to county football in the 2006 National Football League he finished the league as the second highest scorer with a score of 2-12 (0-6f). In his opening game in the Championship for Dublin in the Leinster Senior Football Championship quarter final, he is regarded as single-handedly winning the game for Dublin. In what proved to be a poor Dublin performance, Keaney scored a 0-8 (0-6f) against Longford in a game that sent Dublin into the Leinster Senior Football Championship Semi-final against Laois in Croke Park. His form continued against Laois as Keaney added another 0-06 (2f), as Dublin strolled into the Leinster final. Conal Keaney (for football) and Cork hurling star John Gardiner were named as the Vodafone Players of the Month for June 2006. Keaney won a Leinster senior football medal with Dublin in their victory in the final in 2006. At club level, Keaney made it to the fourth round of the Dublin Senior Football Championship with Ballyboden St Endas, losing to southside rivals Kilmacud Crokes. In October 2006 Conal was called up to represent Leinster in the Railway Cup. Keaney scored 1–03 against Ulster in the Railway Cup semi-final, sending Leinster to the final for a second year in a row. He has been nominated for an all-star for his 2006 performances in the half forward line. Keaney was on the winning team for Leinster in the Martin Donnelly Cup final against Connacht scoring (0–4, 3 frees).

=== 2007 ===
He won the 2007 O'Byrne Cup for Dublin against Laois at O'Connor Park in Offaly. The game finished on a scoreline of 1–18 to 2–13 against Laois. he finished the tournament with 0-12 (0-4f). Conal was the highest scoring player in the Dublin Senior team in the Allianz league, he scored 1-18 (0-8f). Conal scored 0-5 (0-4f) in the opening match of the 2007 Lenster Championship against Meath. The game finished all level with Keaney scoring the crucial point that earned Dublin their draw. In the replay Keaney scored a total of 0-4 (0-3f) and Dublin progressed to the semi-final. The semi final proved a much easier test for Dublin and scored 3 points in Dublins victory over Offaly. Keaney won a Leinster Senior Football Championship medal in Dublins 2007 final victory over Laois.

=== 2008 ===
Conal won his second Dublin Senior Hurling Championship medal in 2008.

=== 2009 ===
Keaney won a Dublin Senior Football Championship medal for Ballyboden St Enda's in 2009 against St Judes in Parnell Park. He then won a Dublin Senior Club Hurling Championship medal, his third in a row, when Ballyboden St Endas beat Craobh Chiaráins in the final. He crowned off a great season by being nominated as Dublin Footballer of the Year. Keaney also won a Leinster Senior Football Championship medal with Dublin in 2009 at Croke Park. His 2009 season finished with speculation that he may return to inter county hurling. He confirmed in January 2010 that he would remain with the football panel for 2010.

=== 2010 ===
Early in 2010 Keaney announced that he would stay with the Football squad for the 2010 season. He was however utilised mainly as a substitute for the 2010 season. He won a fourth SHC club title with Ballyboden

== Hurling ==
Keaney is also renowned as a great hurling player and was a dual-county player for Dublin, he decided to concentrate on Gaelic football in 2005, and opted out of the Dublin Hurling squad in 2005. This dealt a double blow to the Dublin Hurling squad as David O'Callaghan made a similar decision. Keaney amazingly received nomination for an All-star in 2003 despite Dublins lack of progress in the Championship. Also in 2003, Keaney was part of the Dublin side that shocked Leinster hurling by beating Kilkenny in the 2003 Walsh Cup, Keaney scored a point in the game. He rejoined the hurling team in 2011. Keaney played for Ballyboden St Endas in the 2006 Dublin Senior Hurling Championship, losing to Craobh Chiaráin in the final. Keaney won his first Dublin Senior Hurling Championship medal with his club Ballyboden St Endas in October 2007. The Dublin championship win qualified Ballyboden to play in their first ever Leinster Senior Club Hurling Championship game against OULART-THE BALLAGH of Wexford. Boden won the game by 1–17 to 0–15 with Keaney scoring a total of 0-03. Boden then went on to play in the Leinster semi final against Camross and won the game by 2–09 to 1–11. Keaney scored a total of 0–02 in a game which gave Ballyboden their first ever Leinster final game which was held on 2 December 2007 against six-time champions Birr. Boden lost by 1 point.

=== Return to hurling ===
Early in 2011 Keaney, having sat out most of the 2010 season on the bench for the senior footballers, he finally declared his decision to opt off the Football squad and to return to the Hurling squad. In 2011, Keaney played a key role in Dublin's hurling resurgence, scoring 14 points, and winning 'Man of the Match', in Dublin's defeat of the reigning All-Ireland hurling champions, Tipperary, in February 2011. In July 2011, following a motorbike accident, Conal missed the quarter-final victory over Limerick in Semple stadium. Unfortunately, his season was over, despite the Dubs facing Tipperary in the semi-final.

Conal Keaney is one of the only modern Galeic Footballers and Hurler to hold Railway Cups medals in both Hurling and Football

Keaney returned to inter county hurling against Laois in the quarter-finals of the 2012 Leinster Senior Hurling Championship. It proved a facile win for Dublin with a final score of 3–23 to 1-07. Keaney scored a total of 0-02 during his return to senior hurling action and Dublin progressed to the Leinster semi final against Kilkenny.

He announced his retirement from inter-county hurling ahead of the 2021 season.

== Career statistics ==
=== National League appearances ===
#	Date	Venue	Opponent	Score	Result	Competition
1	1 February 2004	Parnell Park, Dublin	Tyrone	0–2	0-9 : 0–8	National Football League Round 1
2	8 February 2004	McHale Park, Castlebar	Mayo	0–1	0-3 : 1–10	National Football League Round 2
3	15 February 2004	Parnell Park, Dublin	Kerry	0–5	0-12 : 1–12	National Football League Round 3
4	7 March 2004	Cusack Park, Mullingar	Westmeath	0–1	0-15 : 0–10	National Football League Round 4
5	4 April 2004	Parnell Park, Dublin	Longford	0–1	2-12 : 2–9	National Football League Round 7
6	13 February 2005	Healy Park, Omagh	Tyrone	-	0-9 : 1–10	National Football League Round 2
7	5 March 2005	Austin Stack Park, Tralee	Kerry	0–2	2-11 : 2–13	National Football League Round 3
8	12 March 2005	Parnell Park, Dublin	Westmeath	0–1	0-11 : 0–9	National Football League Round 4
9	20 March 2005	Parnell Park, Dublin	Donegal	0–1	1-11 : 0–13	National Football League Round 5
10	26 March 2005	Páirc Uí Rinn, Cork	Cork	-	1-6 : 0–18	National Football League Round 6
11	3 April 2005	O'Connor Park, Tullamore	Offaly	0–3	1-13 : 2–6	National Football League Round 7
12	4 March 2006	Parnell Park, Dublin	Offaly	1–3	1-10 : 3–2	National Football League Round 3
13	11 March 2006	Páirc Uí Rinn, Cork	Cork	0–1	1-10 : 1–11	National Football League Round 4
14	19 March 2006	Brewster Park, Fermanagh	Fermanagh	0–2	0-8 : 0–9	National Football League Round 5
15	25 March 2006	Parnell Park, Dublin	Mayo	1–2	4-10 : 1–10	National Football League Round 6
16	9 April 2006	Fitzgerald Stadium, Killarney	Kerry	0–4	0-13 : 0–13	National Football League Round 7
17	3 February 2007	Croke Park, Dublin	Tyrone	0–1	0-10 : 0–11	National Football League Round 1
18	10 February 2007	Gaelic Grounds, Limerick	Limerick	0–3	0-14 : 1–10	National Football League Round 2
19	25 February 2007	Ballyshannon, Donegal	Donegal	0–1	0-5 : 0–9	National Football League Round 3
20	10 March 2007	Parnell Park, Dublin	Cork	1–4	1-13 : 0–7	National Football League Round 4
21	24 March 2007	Parnell Park, Dublin	Fermanagh	0–5	3-15 : 0–7	National Football League Round 5
22	1 April 2007	McHale Park, Castlebar	Mayo	0–3	0-9 : 0–10	National Football League Round 6
23	8 April 2007	Parnell Park, Dublin	Kerry	0–1	2-7 : 1–12	National Football League Round 7
24	2 February 2008	Parnell Park, Dublin	Westmeath	0–1	1-7 : 1–5	National Football League Round 1
25	1 March 2008	Kingspan Breffni Park, Cavan	Cavan	0–2	1-9 : 0–7	National Football League Round 3
26	23 March 2008	Parnell Park, Dublin	Monaghan	0–4	1-10 : 0–13	National Football League Round 4
27	5 April 2008	Parnell Park, Dublin	Roscommon	1–5	3-20 : 0–7	National Football League Round 6
28	13 April 2008	Crossmaglen, Armagh	Armagh	0–4	1-10 : 3–13	National Football League Round 5
29	26 April 2008	Páirc Tailteann, Meath	Westmeath	0–1	0-10 : 0–15	National Football League Division 2 Final
30	31 January 2009	Croke Park, Dublin	Tyrone	0–5	1-16 : 1–18	National Football League Round 1
31	15 February 2009	Pearse Stadium, Salthill	Galway	0–2	0-13 : 3–12	National Football League Round 2
32	8 March 2009	Ballyshannon, Donegal	Donegal	0–4	0-13 : 1–8	National Football League Round 3
33	14 March 2009	Parnell Park, Dublin	Derry	0–3	1-12 : 0-20	National Football League Round 4
34	22 March 2009	Ballina, Mayo	Mayo	0–1	0-9 : 0–9	National Football League Round 5
35	29 March 2009	Parnell Park, Dublin	Kerry	0–2	1-15 : 1–15	National Football League Round 6
36	12 April 2009	Parnell Park, Dublin	Westmeath	1–7	5-22 : 0–10	National Football League Round 7
37	7 March 2010	McHale Park, Castlebar	Mayo	0–1	1-9 : 1–8	National Football League Round 3
38	20 March 2010	Páirc Uí Rinn, Cork	Cork	0–1	2-6 : 2–13	National Football League Round 5
39	27 March 2010	Parnell Park, Dublin	Galway	0–1	0-14 : 1–14	National Football League Round 6

=== Championship appearances ===
#	Date	Venue	Opponent	Score	Result	Competition
1	6 June 2004	Croke Park, Dublin	Westmeath	-	0-12 : 0–14	2004 Leinster Championship Football Quarter final
2	1 August 2004	Croke Park, Dublin	Roscommon	0–1	1-14 : 0–13	2004 Football Qualifiers Round 4
3	14 August 2004	Croke Park, Dublin	Kerry	0–1	1-8 : 1–15	2004 All Ireland Football Quarter final
4	15 May 2005	Croke Park, Dublin	Longford	1–4	2-23 : 0–10	2005 Leinster Championship Football Preliminary Quarter final
5	5 June 2005	Croke Park, Dublin	Meath	0–3	1-12 : 1–10	2005 Leinster Championship Football Quarter final
6	19 June 2005	Croke Park, Dublin	Wexford	0–1	1-17 : 2–10	2005 Leinster Championship Football Semi final
7	17 July 2005	Croke Park, Dublin	Laois	0–1	0-14 : 0–13	2005 Leinster Championship Football Final
8	13 August 2005	Croke Park, Dublin	Tyrone	0–3	1-14 : 1–14	2005 All Ireland Football Quarter final
9	27 August 2005	Croke Park, Dublin	Tyrone	0–5	1-14 : 2–18	2005 All Ireland Football Quarter final replay
10	4 June 2006	Pearse Park, Longford	Longford	0–8	1-12 : 0–13	2006 Leinster Championship Football Quarter final
11	25 June 2006	Croke Park, Dublin	Laois	0–6	3-17 : 0–12	2006 Leinster Championship Football Semi final
12	16 July 2006	Croke Park, Dublin	Offaly	0–2	1-15 : 0–9	2006 Leinster Championship Football Final
13	13 August 2006	Croke Park, Dublin	Westmeath	0–2	1-12 : 0–5	2006 All Ireland Football Quarter final
14	27 August 2006	Croke Park, Dublin	Mayo	1–3	2-12 : 1–16	2006 All-Ireland Football Semi final
15	3 June 2007	Croke Park, Dublin	Meath	0–5	1-11 : 0–14	2007 Leinster Championship Football Quarter final
16	17 June 2007	Croke Park, Dublin	Meath	0–4	0-16 : 0–12	2007 Leinster Championship Football Quarter final replay
17	24 June 2007	Croke Park, Dublin	Offaly	0–3	1-12 : 0–10	2007 Leinster Championship Football Semi final
18	15 July 2007	Croke Park, Dublin	Laois	0–2	3-14 : 1–14	2007 Leinster Championship Football Final
19	11 August 2007	Croke Park, Dublin	Derry	0–3	0-18 : 0–15	2007 All Ireland Football Quarter final
20	26 August 2007	Croke Park, Dublin	Kerry	0–4	0-16 : 1–15	2007 All-Ireland Football Semi final
21	8 June 2008	Croke Park, Dublin	Louth	0–3	1-22 : 0–12	2008 Leinster Championship Football Quarter final
22	29 June 2008	Croke Park, Dublin	Westmeath	0–2	0-13 : 1–8	2008 Leinster Championship Football Semi final
23	20 July 2008	Croke Park, Dublin	Wexford	0–6	3-23 : 0–9	2008 Leinster Championship Football Final
24	16 August 2008	Croke Park, Dublin	Tyrone	1-1	1-8 : 3–14	2008 All Ireland Football Quarter final
25	7 June 2009	Croke Park, Dublin	Meath	0–5	0-14 : 0–12	2009 Leinster Championship Football Quarter final
26	28 June 2009	Croke Park, Dublin	Westmeath	0–4	4-26 : 0–11	2009 Leinster Championship Football Semi final
27	12 July 2009	Croke Park, Dublin	Kildare	0–3	2-15 : 0–18	2009 Leinster Championship Football Final
28	3 August 2009	Croke Park, Dublin	Kerry	1–0	1-7 : 1-24	2009 All Ireland Football Quarter final
29	13 June 2010	Croke Park, Dublin	Wexford	0–2	2-16 : 0–15	Leinster Championship Quarter final
30	27 June 2010	Croke Park, Dublin	Meath	0–1	0-13 : 5–9	Leinster Championship Semi final
31	10 July 2010	Croke Park, Dublin	Tipperary	0–3	1-21 : 1–13	Qualifiers Round 2
32	31 July 2010	Croke Park, Dublin	Tyrone	0–1	1-15 : 0–13	All Ireland Quarter final
