= 2004 National Football League (Ireland) =

Football League

League details
- Dates: 1 February - 2 May 2004
- Teams: 32

League champions
- Winners: Kerry (17th win)
- Captain: Tomás Ó Sé
- Manager: Jack O'Connor

League runners-up
- Runners-up: Galway
- Captain: Gary Fahey
- Manager: John O'Mahony

Other division winners
- Division 2: Offaly

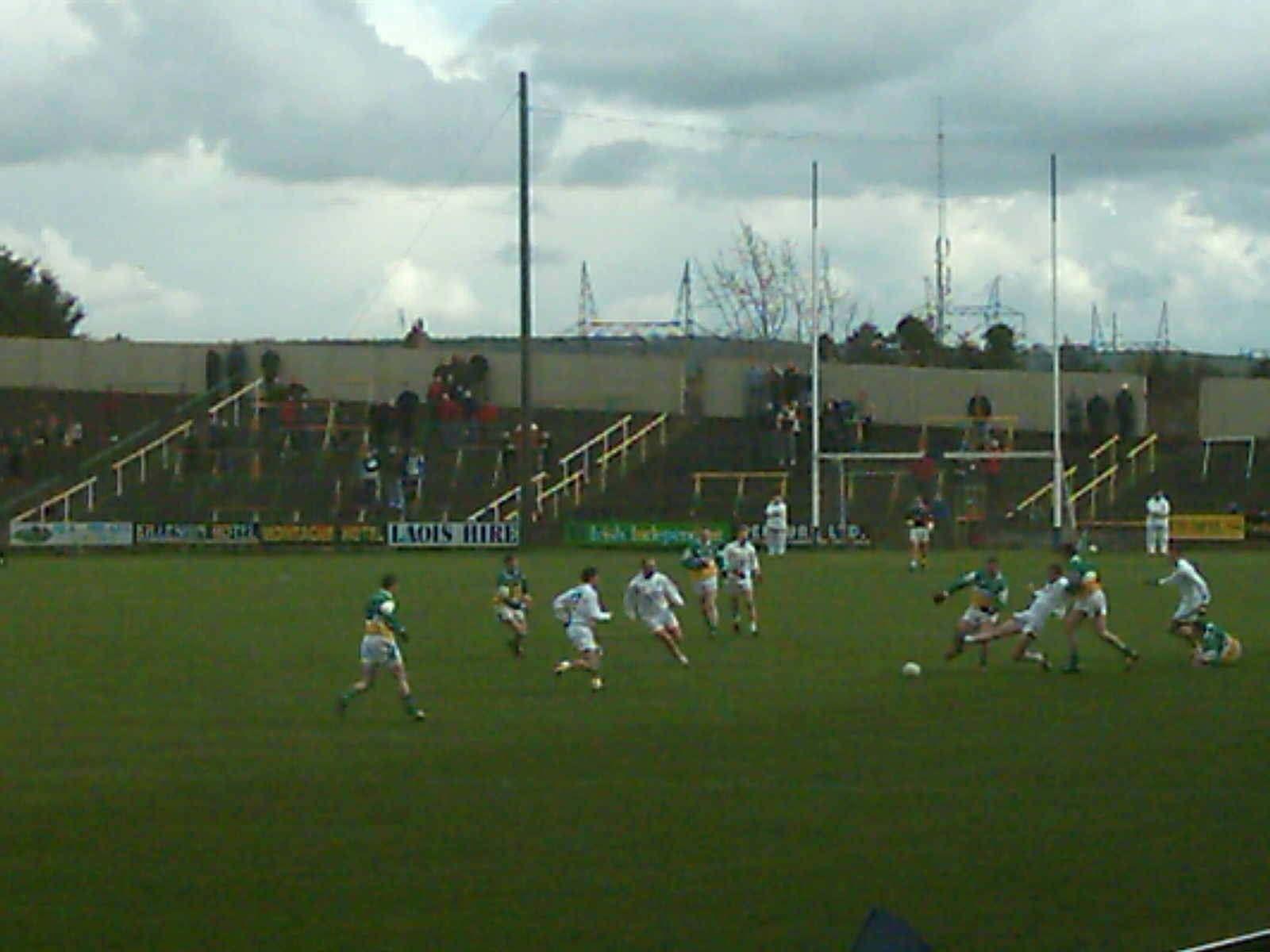
Offaly v. Kildare, Division 2 semi-final, O'Moore Park, 18 April 2004

The 2004 National Football League, known for sponsorship reasons as the Allianz National Football League, was the 73rd staging of the National Football League (NFL), an annual Gaelic football tournament for the Gaelic Athletic Association county teams of Ireland. Kerry beat Galway in the final.

== Format ==
=== League structure ===
The top 16 teams were drawn into Divisions 1A and 1B. The other 16 teams were drawn into Divisions 2A and 2B. Each team played all the other teams in its section once: either home or away. Teams earned 2 points for a win and 1 for a draw.

=== Finals, promotions and relegations ===
The top two teams in Divisions 2A and 2B progressed to the Division 2 semi-finals and were promoted to Division 1. The bottom two teams in Divisions 1A and 1B were relegated. The top two teams in Divisions 1A and 1B progressed to the NFL semi-finals.

=== Tie-breaker ===
If two or more teams are level on points, points difference was used to rank the teams.

== Division 1 ==
=== Division 1A Table ===
Compete in Division 1 semi-finals Automatic relegation to Division 2A

Team	Pld	W	D	L	F	A	Diff	Pts
Tyrone	7	5	1	1	11-71	3-55	40	11
Kerry	7	5	0	2	8-83	4-60	35	10
Cork	7	3	3	1	8-64	4-62	14	9
Dublin	7	3	2	2	2-72	4-70	-4	8
Mayo	7	3	0	4	5-66	7-68	-8	6
Westmeath	7	1	2	4	5-72	10-75	-18	4
Fermanagh	7	1	2	4	1-66	7-76	-28	4
Longford	7	2	0	5	9-63	10-91	-31	4

=== Division 1A Rounds 1 to 7 ===
31/01/04; Round 1	Cork	1-8 - 2-5	Westmeath	Páirc Uí Rinn, Cork

01/02/04; Round 1	Longford	3-7 - 1-12	Kerry	Pearse Park, Longford

01/02/04; Round 1	Dublin	0-9 - 0-8	Tyrone	Parnell Park, Dublin

01/02/04; Round 1	Fermanagh	0-8 - 1-7	Mayo	Brewster Park, Enniskillen

07/02/04; Round 2	Kerry	0-11 - 0-9	Cork	Austin Stack Park, Tralee

08/02/04; Round 2	Tyrone	2-9 - 0-10	Fermanagh	Healy Park, Omagh

08/02/04; Round 2	Westmeath	1-13 - 2-12	Longford	Cusack Park, Mullingar

08/02/04; Round 2	Mayo	1-10 - 0-3	Dublin	MacHale Park, Castlebar

14/02/04; Round 3	Cork	2-9 - 0-10	Mayo	Páirc Uí Rinn, Cork

15/02/04; Round 3	Dublin	0-12 - 1-12	Kerry	Parnell Park, Dublin

15/02/04; Round 3	Longford	0-9 - 3-15	Tyrone	Pearse Park, Longford

15/02/04; Round 3	Fermanagh	1-9 - 0-12	Westmeath	Brewster Park, Enniskillen

07/03/04; Round 4	Westmeath	0-10 - 0-15	Dublin	Cusack Park, Mullingar

07/03/04; Round 4	Kerry	2-18 - 0-6	Fermanagh	Fitzgerald Stadium, Killarney

07/03/04; Round 4	Mayo	0-16 - 0-8	Longford	St Stephen's Park, Ballina

13/03/04; Round 4	Cork	3-10 - 1-10	Longford	Páirc Uí Rinn, Cork

14/03/04; Round 5	Westmeath	0-10 - 2-10	Kerry	Cusack Park, Mullingar

14/03/04; Round 5	Mayo	1-5 - 2-11	Tyrone	MacHale Park, Castlebar

14/03/04; Round 5	Fermanagh	0-12 - 0-12	Dublin	Brewster Park, Enniskillen

21/03/04; Round 5	Tyrone	2-11 - 0-6	Westmeath	Healy Park, Omagh

21/03/04; Round 6	Kerry	1-13 - 0-8	Mayo	Austin Stack Park, Tralee

21/03/04; Round 6	Dublin	0-9 - 0-9	Cork	Parnell Park, Dublin

27/03/04; Round 6	Longford	1-8 - 0-13	Fermanagh	Pearse Park, Longford

27/03/04; Round 6	Tyrone	1-9 - 1-9	Cork	Healy Park, Omagh

03/04/04; Round 7	Cork	1-10 - 0-8	Fermanagh	Páirc Uí Rinn, Cork

04/04/04; Round 7	Tyrone	1-8 - 1-7	Kerry	Healy Park, Omagh

04/04/04; Round 7	Westmeath	2-16 - 2-10	Mayo	Cusack Park, Mullingar

04/04/04; Round 7	Dublin	2-12 - 2-9	Longford	Parnell Park, Dublin

=== Division 1B Table ===
Compete in Division 1 semi-finals Automatic relegation to Division 2B

Team	Pld	W	D	L	F	A	Diff	Pts
Limerick	7	4	2	1	7-74	8-59	12	10
Galway	7	3	2	2	10-79	12-74	-1	8
Sligo	7	3	2	2	7-73	8-74	-4	8
Wexford	7	3	1	3	11-75	7-66	21	7
Laois	7	3	1	3	7-71	9-72	-7	7
Armagh	7	3	1	3	5-67	7-76	-15	7
Meath	7	2	2	3	12-62	7-75	2	6
Cavan	7	1	1	5	7-71	8-76	-8	3

=== Division 1B Rounds 1 to 7 ===
01/02/04; Round 1	Sligo	2-12 - 0-9	Cavan	Markievicz Park, Sligo

01/02/04; Round 1	Meath	2-12 - 1-12	Galway	Páirc Tailteann, Navan

01/02/04; Round 1	Limerick	2-13 - 1-5	Laois	Gaelic Grounds, Limerick

01/02/04; Round 1	Armagh	1-6 - 0-8	Wexford	St. Oliver Plunkett Park, Crossmaglen

08/02/04; Round 2	Wexford	0-10 - 1-5	Meath	Wexford Park, Wexford

08/02/04; Round 2	Galway	0-16 - 0-8	Armagh	Pearse Stadium, Salthill

08/02/04; Round 2	Laois	0-8 - 2-6	Sligo	O'Moore Park, Portlaoise

08/02/04; Round 2	Cavan	0-7 - 0-11	Limerick	Kingscourt Stars GAA Grounds, Cavan

15/02/04; Round 3	Limerick	2-10 - 1-9	Wexford	Gaelic Grounds, Limerick

15/02/04; Round 3	Meath	2-11 - 0-12	Cavan	Páirc Tailteann, Navan

15/02/04; Round 3	Sligo	1-11 - 1-11	Galway	Markievicz Park, Sligo

15/02/04; Round 3	Armagh	1-14 - 2-8	Laois	St. Oliver Plunkett Park, Crossmaglen

07/03/04; Round 4	Laois	1-15 - 1-12	Meath	O'Moore Park, Portlaoise

07/03/04; Round 4	Galway	4-11 - 1-10	Limerick	Dunlo GAA Grounds, Ballinasloe

07/03/04; Round 4	Wexford	3-17 - 0-13	Sligo	Wexford Park, Wexford

07/03/04; Round 4	Cavan	3-12 - 0-8	Armagh	Breffni Park, Cavan

14/03/04; Round 5	Limerick	2-5 - 1-8	Meath	Gaelic Grounds, Limerick

14/03/04; Round 5	Laois	1-10 - 1-10	Galway	O'Moore Park, Portlaoise

14/03/04; Round 5	Armagh	1-12 - 0-10	Sligo	St. Oliver Plunkett Park, Crossmaglen

14/03/04; Round 5	Wexford	1-11 - 1-11	Cavan	Wexford Park, Wexford

21/03/04; Round 6	Meath	2-7 - 2-7	Armagh	Páirc Tailteann, Navan

21/03/04; Round 6	Cavan	1-9 - 1-11	Laois	Breffni Park, Cavan

21/03/04; Round 6	Galway	1-7 - 5-12	Wexford	St Jarlath's Park, Tuam

21/03/04; Round 6	Sligo	1-7 - 0-10	Limerick	Markievicz Park, Sligo

04/04/04; Round 7	Limerick	0-15 - 0-12	Armagh	Gaelic Grounds, Limerick

04/04/04; Round 7	Laois	1-14 - 1-8	Wexford	O'Moore Park, Portlaoise

04/04/04; Round 7	Cavan	2-11 - 2-12	Galway	Breffni Park, Cavan

04/04/04; Round 7	Sligo	1-14 - 3-7	Meath	Markievicz Park, Sligo

=== Division 1 Semi-finals ===
18/04/04; Semi-final	Tyrone	1-16 - 1-16	Galway	Healy Park, Omagh

20/04/03; Semi-final	Limerick	0-10 - 0-12	Kerry	Gaelic Grounds, Limerick

25/04/04; Semi-final replay	Galway	2-18 - 1-19	Tyrone	Pearse Stadium, Salthill

=== Division 1 Final ===
02/05/04; Final	Kerry	3-11 - 1-16	Galway	Croke Park, Dublin
02/05/04; Final	Mike Frank Russell 0-6; Colm Cooper 0-2; Declan O'Sullivan, Eoin Brosnan, Tomás Ó Sé, Ronán O'Connor 0-1 each	Report	Michael Donnellan 1-4; Padraig Joyce 0-5; Declan Meehan, Sean Og de Paor, Joe Bergin, Matthew Clancy, Tommy Joyce 0-1 each	Croke Park, Dublin

== Division 2 ==
=== Division 2A Table ===
Compete in Division 2 semi-finals and automatic promotion to Division 1A

Team	Pld	W	D	L	F	A	Diff	Pts
Donegal	7	7	0	0	11-76	6-49	42	14
Offaly	7	6	0	1	11-71	5-58	31	12
Roscommon	7	5	0	2	3-80	5-56	18	10
Monaghan	7	2	1	4	6-70	7-68	-1	5
Leitrim	7	2	1	4	4-47	6-68	-27	5
Clare	7	2	0	5	5-75	9-65	-2	4
Carlow	7	2	0	5	5-65	7-82	-23	4
London	7	1	0	6	7-54	7-92	-38	2

=== Division 2A Rounds 1 to 7 ===
01/02/04; Round 1	Donegal	2-7 - 1-7	Offaly	MacCumhail Park, Ballybofey

01/02/04; Round 1	Carlow	0-13 - 0-11	Monaghan	Dr. Cullen Park, Carlow

01/02/04; Round 1	London	0-8 - 2-6	Leitrim	Emerald GAA Grounds, Ruislip

01/02/04; Round 1	Clare	0-6 - 0-11	Roscommon	Cuasck Park, Ennis

08/02/04; Round 2	Roscommon	0-17 - 1-9	Carlow	Dr. Hyde Park, Roscommon

08/02/04; Round 2	Monaghan	4-9 - 1-12	Clare	St Tiernach's Park, Clones

08/02/04; Round 2	Offaly	1-13 - 1-8	London	O'Connor Park, Tullamore

08/02/04; Round 2	Leitrim	1-5 - 2-10	Donegal	St Mary's GAA Park, Cloone

15/02/04; Round 3	Donegal	3-6 - 1-11	Monaghan	Fr Tierney Park, Ballyshannon

15/02/04; Round 3	London	2-7 - 2-12	Roscommon	Emerald GAA Grounds, Ruislip

15/02/04; Round 3	Clare	1-13 - 0-9	Leitrim	Cusack Park, Ennis

15/02/04; Round 3	Carlow	1-11 - 2-9	Offaly	Dr. Cullen Park, Carlow

07/03/04; Round 4	Offaly	1-11 - 0-10	Clare	O'Connor Park, Tullamore

07/03/04; Round 4	Leitrim	1-10 - 1-8	Carlow	Páirc Seán Mac Diarmada, Carrick-on-Shannon

07/03/04; Round 4	Monaghan	0-15 - 0-9	London	St Tiernach's Park, Clones

07/03/04; Round 4	Roscommon	0-11 - 0-12	Donegal	Dr. Hyde Park, Roscommon

14/03/04; Round 5	London	1-6 - 1-14	Donegal	Emerald GAA Grounds, Ruislip

14/03/04; Round 5	Roscommon	0-12 - 1-4	Monaghan	Dr. Hyde Park, Roscommon

14/03/04; Round 5	Clare	0-10 - 2-7	Carlow	Cusack Park, Ennis

14/03/04; Round 5	Leitrim	0-4 - 2-10	Offaly	Páirc Seán Mac Diarmada, Carrick-on-Shannon

21/03/04; Round 6	Offaly	1-13 - 1-6	Roscommon	O'Connor Park, Tullamore

21/03/04; Round 6	Donegal	0-12 - 2-4	Clare	MacCumhail Park, Ballybofey

21/03/04; Round 6	Carlow	0-12 - 1-10	London	Dr. Cullen Park, Carlow

21/03/04; Round 6	Monaghan	0-8 - 0-8	Leitrim	St Tiernach's Park, Clones

04/04/04; Round 7	Donegal	3-15 - 0-5	Carlow	Fr Tierney Park, Ballyshannon

04/04/04; Round 7	Offaly	3-8 - 0-12	Monaghan	O'Connor Park, Tullamore

04/04/04; Round 7	Clare	1-20 - 2-6	London	Cusack Park, Ennis

04/04/04; Round 7	Roscommon	0-11 - 0-5	Leitrim	Dr. Hyde Park, Roscommon

=== Division 2B Table ===
Compete in Division 2 semi-finals and automatic promotion to Division 1B

Team	Pld	W	D	L	F	A	Diff	Pts
Kildare	7	6	1	0	5-100	3-66	40	13
Down	7	3	4	0	13-78	9-65	25	10
Wicklow	7	4	1	2	5-68	2-60	17	9
Tipperary	7	4	1	2	8-87	7-79	11	9
Antrim	7	3	1	3	7-70	12-69	-14	7
Derry	7	3	0	4	11-90	9-62	34	6
Louth	7	1	0	6	7-72	6-100	-25	2
Waterford	7	0	0	7	6-56	14-120	-88	0

=== Division 2B Rounds 1 to 7 ===
01/02/04; Round 1	Down	3-11 - 3-11	Tipperary	Páirc Esler, Newry

01/02/04; Round 1	Kildare	1-14 - 0-12	Derry	St Conleth's Park, Newbridge

01/02/04; Round 1	Louth	1-7 - 1-9	Antrim	Páirc na nGael, Dundalk

01/02/04; Round 1	Waterford	0-8 - 1-16	Wicklow	Walsh Park, Waterford

08/02/04; Round 2	Antrim	1-8 - 1-10	Kildare	Casement Park, Belfast

08/02/04; Round 2	Wicklow	1-5 - 0-8	Down	Aughrim County Ground, Aughrim

08/02/04; Round 2	Derry	0-21 - 1-7	Louth	Celtic Park, Derry

08/02/04; Round 2	Tipperary	0-17 - 1-8	Waterford	Clonmel GAA Ground, Clonmel

15/02/04; Round 3	Waterford	3-8 - 1-16	Antrim	Walsh Park, Waterford

15/02/04; Round 3	Down	2-10 - 2-6	Derry	St Patrick's Park, Newcastle

15/02/04; Round 3	Louth	1-8 - 1-11	Wicklow	St Mary's GAA Park, Ardee

15/02/04; Round 3	Kildare	0-13 - 0-8	Tipperary	St Conleth's Park, Newbridge

07/03/04; Round 4	Derry	5-17 - 0-4	Waterford	Dean McGlinchey Park, Ballinascreen

07/03/04; Round 4	Antrim	1-9 - 1-9	Down	Casement Park, Belfast

07/03/04; Round 4	Tipperary	0-16 - 1-10	Louth	Clonmel GAA Ground, Clonmel

07/03/04; Round 4	Wicklow	0-11 - 0-13	Kildare	Aughrim County Ground, Aughrim

14/03/04; Round 5	Down	3-15 - 1-9	Waterford	Páirc Esler, Newry

14/03/04; Round 5	Derry	3-13 - 1-8	Antrim	Celtic Park, Derry

14/03/04; Round 5	Kildare	0-15 - 1-11	Louth	St Conleth's Park, Newbridge

14/03/04; Round 5	Tipperary	0-7 - 0-12	Wicklow	Clonmel GAA Ground, Clonmel

21/03/04; Round 6	Louth	1-12 - 3-15	Down	Drogheda Park, Drogheda

21/03/04; Round 6	Antrim	1-11 - 2-15	Tipperary	Casement Park, Belfast

21/03/04; Round 6	Wicklow	1-6 - 0-7	Derry	Aughrim County Ground, Aughrim

21/03/04; Round 6	Waterford	0-6 - 3-22	Kildare	Walsh Park, Waterford

04/04/04; Round 7	Louth	1-17 - 1-13	Waterford	Drogheda Park, Drogheda

04/04/04; Round 7	Tipperary	3-13 - 1-14	Derry	Semple Stadium, Thurles

04/04/04; Round 7	Down	1-10 - 0-13	Kildare	St Patrick's Park, Newcastle

04/04/04; Round 7	Antrim	1-9 - 1-7	Wicklow	Casement Park, Belfast

=== Division 2 Semi-finals ===
18/04/04; Semi-final	Down	2-05 - 0-10	Donegal	St Tiernach's Park, Clones

18/04/04; Semi-final	Offaly	1-16 - 1-08	Kildare	O'Moore Park, Portlaoise; Referee: M Daly (Mayo)

=== Division 2 Final ===
02/05/04; Final	Offaly	1-16 - 2-12	Down	Croke Park

== Statistics ==
- All scores correct as of 12 March 2016

=== Scoring ===
- Widest winning margin: 28
  - Derry 5-17 - 0-4 Waterford (Division 2b)
- Most goals in a match: 6
  - Galway 1-7 - 5-12 Wexford (Division 1b)
  - Down 3-11 - 3-11 Tipperary (Division 2b)
- Most points in a match: 30
  - Wexford 3-17 - 0-13 Sligo (Division 1b)
  - Louth 1-17 - 1-13 Waterford (Division 2b)
- Most goals by one team in a match: 5
  - Derry 5-17 - 0-4 Waterford (Division 2b)
  - Galway 1-7 - 5-12 Wexford (Division 1b)
- Highest aggregate score: 40 points
  - Down 3-11 - 3-11 Tipperary (Division 2b)
- Lowest aggregate score: 16 points
  - Roscommon 0-11 - 0-5 Leitrim (Division 2a)
  - Monaghan 0-8 - 0-8 Leitrim (Division 2a)
  - Mayo 1-10 - 0-3 Dublin (Division 1a)
  - Wicklow 1-6 - 0-7 Derry (Division 2b)
  - Wicklow 1-5 - 0-8 Down (Division 2b)
