= Leo Smith (hurler) =

Irish hurler

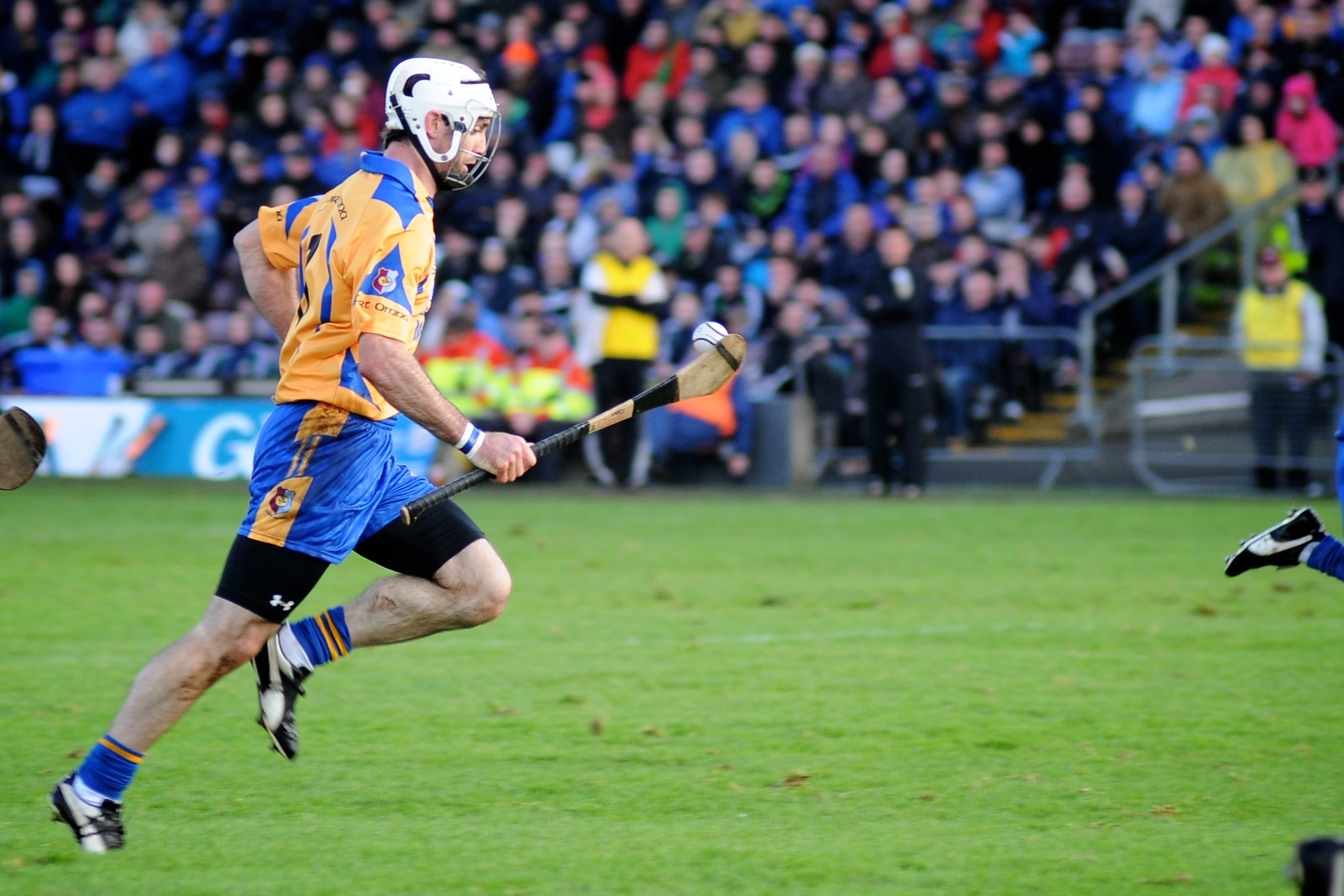
- Leo Smith in action for Portumna in 2013

Personal information
- Native name: Leo Mac Gabhann (Irish)
- Born: 03/07/81 Ballinasloe, County Galway, Ireland
- Occupation: School Teacher
- Height: 1.78 m (5 ft 10 in)

Sport
- Sport: Hurling
- Position: Midfield
Club
- Years: Club
- Portumna
Club titles
- Galway titles: 6
- Connacht titles: 3
- All-Ireland Titles: 3
Inter-county
- Years: County
- 2005-: Westmeath

Leo Smith is a hurler from Portumna in County Galway, Ireland but plays with the Westmeath senior team, with whom he won Christy Ring Cup tiles in 2005 and 2007. With Portumna he has won Galway Senior Hurling Championships in 2005, 2007, 2008 and 2009, 2013Connacht Senior Club Hurling Championships in 2005 & 2007 and All-Ireland Senior Club Hurling Championships in 2006, 2007, 2009 and 2013. Smith qualifies to play for the Lake County through his work as a teacher in Athlone. Now teaching Ag science, biology, and chemistry in his native Portumna.

== Honours ==
=== Portumna ===
- All-Ireland Senior Club Hurling Championship:
  - Winner (4): 2006, 2008, 2009, 2014
  - Runner-up (1): 2010
- Connacht Senior Club Hurling Championship:
  - Winner (3):2003, 2005, 2007
- Galway Senior Hurling Championship:
  - Winner (6): 2003, 2005, 2007, 2008, 2009, 2013
  - Runner-up (2): 2004, 2006

=== Westmeath ===
- Christy Ring Cup:
  - Winner (3): 2005, 2007, 2010
  - Runner-Up (1): 2008
- National Hurling League Div 2:
  - Winner (1): 2008
- Kehoe Cup:
  - Winner (3): 2008 2009 2010
