= Shane Durkin =

Irish hurler

Personal information
- Native name: Shane Mac Dhuarcáin (Irish)
- Born: 1 July 1987 (age 39) Dublin, Ireland
- Occupation: Primary school teacher
- Height: 1.8 m (5 ft 11 in)

Sport
- Sport: Hurling
- Position: Right wing-back
Club
- Years: Club
- 2005–present: Ballyboden St Enda's
Club titles
	Football	Hurling
Dublin titles	2	7
Leinster titles	1	0
All-Ireland titles	1	0
Inter-county*
Years	County	Apps (scores)
2009–2016; 2018	Dublin	29 (0-15)
Inter-county titles
- Leinster titles: 1
- All-Irelands: 0
- NHL: 1
- All Stars: 0
- *Inter County team apps and scores correct as of 18:34, 7 January 2019.

Shane Durkin (born 1 July 1987) is an Irish hurler who plays for Dublin Senior Championship club Ballyboden St Enda's. He usually plays as a wing-back, but can also be deployed at midfield. Durkin was a member of the Dublin senior hurling team that won the 2011 National League and 2013 Leinster Championship.

Durkin first came to prominence as a hurler and Gaelic footballer at juvenile and underage levels with the Ballyboden St Enda's club. After losing back-to-back Dublin Minor Championship finals, he later won back-to-back Dublin Under-21 Championship titles in 2006 and 2007. As a member of the Ballyboden St Enda's senior teams as a dual player, Durkin has won a combined total of nine Dublin Senior Championships, a Leinster Club Football Championship and an All-Ireland Club Football Championship in 2016.

Durkin first played for Dublin as a member of the 2005 Leinster Minor Championship-winning team, before later winning a Leinster Under-21 Championship medal in 2007. He made his first appearance with the Dublin senior team in 2009 and enjoyed his first success by winning a National Hurling League medal in 2011. Durkin later won a Leinster Senior Championship medal in 2013, when Dublin claimed the title for the first time in 52 years. He ended the year by being nominated for an All Star. Durkin announced his retirement from inter-county hurling on 7 January 2019.

Durkin attended secondary school at Terenure College, Dublin.

== Career statistics ==
Team	Year	National League			Leinster		All-Ireland		Total	
Team	Year	Division	Apps	Score	Apps	Score	Apps	Score	Apps	Score
Dublin	2009	Division 1	7	0-06	3	0-01	1	0-01	11	0-08
Dublin	2010	Division 1	7	0-10	2	0-05	2	0-01	11	0-16
Dublin	2011	Division 1	8	0-01	3	0-01	1	0-00	12	0-02
Dublin	2012	Division 1A	6	0-01	2	0-02	1	0-00	9	0-03
Dublin	2013	Division 1B	6	0-02	5	0-03	1	0-01	12	0-06
Dublin	2014	Division 1A	5	0-02	2	0-00	1	0-00	8	0-02
Dublin	2015	Division 1A	7	0-04	2	0-00	2	0-00	11	0-04
Dublin	2016	Division 1A	0	0-00	0	0-00	0	0-00	0	0-00
Dublin	2017	Division 1A	—		—		—		—	
Dublin	2018	Division 1B	0	0-00	1	0-00	—		1	0-00
Total			46	0-26	20	0-12	9	0-03	75	0-41

== Honours ==
Ballyboden St Enda's

- All-Ireland Senior Club Football Championship (1): 2016
- Leinster Senior Club Football Championship (1): 2015
- Dublin Senior Hurling Championship (7): 2007, 2008, 2009, 2010, 2011, 2013, 2018
- Dublin Senior Football Championship (2): 2009, 2015
- Dublin Under-21 Hurling Championship (2): 2006, 2007

Dublin

- Leinster Senior Hurling Championship (1): 2013
- National Hurling League Division 1 (1): 2011
- National Hurling League Division 1B (1): 2013
- Leinster Under-21 Hurling Championship (1): 2007
- Leinster Minor Hurling Championship (1): 2005
