= Niall O'Shea =

London-born Gaelic footballer

Personal information
- Native name: Níall Ó Sé (Irish)
- Born: London, England

Sport
- Sport: Gaelic football
- Position: Corner Back
Club
- Years: Club
- St Jude's
Inter-county
- Years: County
- 2006–2008: Dublin

Niall O'Shea is a London-born Gaelic footballer who plays for the St Jude's GAA club and for the Dublin county team. He won the 2007 O'Byrne Cup for Dublin against Laois at O'Connor Park in Offaly. The game finished on a scoreline of 1–18 to 2–13 against Laois. O'Shea was on Dublin's winning team for the 2008 O'Byrne Cup winning team which defeated Longford in the final.
