= Simon Lambert (hurler) =

Irish hurler

Personal information
- Native name: Simon Laimbeart (Irish)
- Born: 26 October 1988 (age 38) Dublin, Ireland
- Occupation: Games Promotion Officer
- Height: 1.75 m (5 ft 9 in)

Sport
- Sport: Hurling
- Position: Midfield
Club
- Years: Club
- 2007–: Ballyboden St Enda's
Club titles
- Dublin titles: 6
Inter-county
- Years: County
- 2008–2015: Dublin
Inter-county titles
- Leinster titles: 1
- NHL: 1

Simon Lambert (born 17 April 1988) is a hurler for Dublin and Ballyboden St Enda's. He won a Dublin Senior Hurling Championship medal with Ballyboden in 2007. Lambert was dropped from the Dublin hurling panel in December 2015.

Lambert was a member of the Ballyboden St Enda's football team that won the 2015–16 All-Ireland Senior Club Football Championship.
