= Brendan McManamon =

Irish Gaelic footballer

Brendan McManamon (born 1982) is a Gaelic footballer who plays for the St Jude's club and the Dublin county team.

McManamon was on Dublin's winning team for the 2008 O'Byrne Cup which defeated Longford in the final.' He scored 0–1 in the game which saw Dublin win by 2–12 to 1–14. McManamon has been a Dublin senior panelist for the last three years and has many championship appearances to his name, making the first of these against Louth at Croke Park on 8 June 2008, coming on as a 61st minute sub for his boyhood hero Jason Sherlock. The highlight of McManamon's club career came in October 2009, when he was part of the Naomh Jude senior side who narrowly lost out to Ballyboden St Enda's in their first county final. McManamon scored a point in his first league game in 2010 against Derry at Parnell Park.

McManamon is famous for retiring Meath Gaelic football legend Graham Geraghty, who has been quoted as saying he "could have played on for several more years if it were not for Brendan serving up a dose of reality as to the speed of the modern game".

McManamon's brother Kevin is also a Dublin senior footballer.
