= Ballyboden St Enda's GAA =

Gaelic sports club in Dublin, Ireland

Ballyboden St Enda's
- Baile Buadáin Naomh Éanna
- Founded: 1969
- County: Dublin
- Colours: Blue and white stripes
- Grounds: Páirc Uí Mhurchú
- Coordinates: 53°17′19.52″N 6°19′02.65″W

Playing kits
Standard colours

Senior Club Championships
	All Ireland	Leinster champions	Dublin champions
Football:	1	3	5
Hurling:	0	0	7
Ladies' football:	2	6	10
Camogie:	0	1	10

Ballyboden St Enda's (Irish: CLG Baile Buadáin Naomh Éanna) is a Gaelic Athletic Association club located in the suburb of Knocklyon in Dublin, Ireland. The club serves the Rathfarnham, Knocklyon, Ballycullen, Ballyboden, Ballyroan and Firhouse areas. The club fields teams in hurling, camogie, Gaelic football, handball and rounders. Ballyboden St Enda's was founded in 1969 after the merger of two clubs in the Rathfarnham area – Ballyboden Wanderers (founded 1910) and Rathfarnham St. Endas (founded 1966).

The club's home ground, Páirc Uí Mhurchú, is located on the Firhouse Road. It was renamed, in 1984, in honour of the club's founding member and first chairman, Ned Murphy (Éamonn Ó Murchú; 1908–1981).

According to The Irish Times, Ballyboden is "almost certainly... the biggest sports club in Europe", with 172 teams representing it in 2020.

== Overview ==
=== Ladies' Senior Football ===
The 'Boden Ladies' Senior Football team has won two All-Ireland, six Leinster and ten Dublin Ladies' Senior Football Championship. Ballyboden's women's senior football team were crowned All-Ireland Club champions in 2004 with a win over Donoughmore from Cork with a final scoreline of 2–7 to 1–9. They retained their title in 2005. In total, they have won six Leinster titles (2001, 2002, 2004, 2005, 2006, and 2007), and have captured ten county titles – including nine consecutive titles with victory over Na Fianna in 2008. In addition, ten Senior League Division 1 titles have been won.

=== Senior Camogie ===
The Ladies' Senior Camogie team have captured 10 Dublin Senior Championships, as well as four Senior A Dublin League titles (1999, 2001, 2009, 2010) and a Senior Leinster Championship title (2008).

=== Senior Football ===
Ballyboden won their first Dublin Senior Football Championship in 1995, defeating Erin's Isle by a single point – 1-07 to 0-09. They also completed their first league and championship double that year, winning Dublin League Division 1. The club gained their second Dublin Senior Football Championship in 2009, beating local rivals St Jude's by a scoreline of 2-12 to 1-13. A third county title was claimed in 2015 when St. Vincents were beaten on a scoreline of 2-08 to 0-10 and won again in 2019, beating Thomas Davis GAA 0–15 to 0–9. Their fifth and most recent title was won on a scoreline of 1-16 to 1-12 in 2025 against Na Fianna. 'Boden were also beaten county finalists in 2004, losing to Kilmacud Crokes (1–11 to 2–02), in 2020, losing to Ballymun Kickhams, and in 2023, losing to Kilmacud Crokes. In addition, they have won six Dublin AFL Division 1 titles (1995, 2003, 2016, 2023, 2025, 2026), as well as finishing runners up in 2018 and 2019. The club have also claimed five U/21 Dublin Championships (1995, 1997, 2003, 2014, 2023) and seven Dublin Minor Football Championships (1990, 1993, 1996, 1998, 2002, 2010, 2020).

On 6 December 2015, Ballyboden claimed their first Leinster Senior Club Football Championship title, defeating Portlaoise on a scoreline of 2-09 to 1-11, with substitute Aran Waters kicking a late winning point.

Following victory over Clonmel Commercials in the All Ireland semi-final on a scoreline of 0–15 to 0–10 (following extra time), 'Boden went on to contest their first All Ireland Football final on St. Patrick's day in Croke Park. After scoring two goals in the first fifteen minutes, Ballyboden won the title, beating favourites Castlebar Mitchels on a scoreline of 2–14 to 0–07. Andy McEntee, who went on to manage Meath, was manager of Ballyboden at the time.

A second Leinster Club title was added in 2019 following a narrow 0–8 to 0–6 victory over Éire Óg of Carlow. A third title was claimed against Athy in December 2025, with ‘Boden winning on a scoreline of 2-18 to 1-14.

=== Senior Hurling ===
The 'Boden Senior A hurling team made history in 2007 when the side claimed the club's first senior championship crown to complete the full set of senior titles. The final score on an historic night was Ballyboden St Endas 2-13 St. Vincents 1-5. This victory was achieved after the club had finished as runners up in the Dublin Championship on five previous occasions (1983, 1988, 2001, 2004, 2006). They retained their title in 2008 with a victory against southside rivals Kilmacud Crokes. In 2009 they made it three in a row when they defeated old foes, Craobh Chiarán. Captained by Gary Maguire, a fourth successive title was added in 2010 as 'Boden became the first team to achieve this landmark since 1928. 2011 saw Boden, under captain David Curtin, win the SHC for the fifth year in a row. A sixth title was won in 2013, before their most recent title in 2018 following a three-point win over Kilmacud Crokes after a replay. The League title was also added in 2018 following a 4-point victory in the league final over Na Fianna to complete a league/championship double. In 2020, 'Boden narrowly lost out to Cuala in a thrilling final (2-20 to 1-18) in Parnell Park. They also finished runners up in 2023 to Na Fianna - the 7th occasion the club has been beaten in the county final (1983, 1988, 2001, 2004, 2006, 2020, 2023). In June 2010 the club became the first Dublin club to win the Leinster Senior League Division 1. They achieved this (without their 7 Dublin Senior players) by beating Castlecomer after extra time in Nolan Park on a scoreline of 3–21 to 3–19. Further Leinster Senior League titles were added in 2013 and 2016. Ballyboden have also won eleven Dublin Senior Hurling Division 1 league titles (1993, 1999, 2004, 2007, 2009, 2012, 2013, 2017, 2018, 2023, 2026), nine Dublin U/21 and ten Dublin Minor championships.

== Honours ==
=== Dublin Senior Championship Titles ===
- Dublin Senior Football Championship Winners (5 titles): 1995, 2009, 2015, 2019, 2025
- Dublin Senior 2 Football Championship: Winners (1 title): 2017
- Dublin Senior Hurling Championship Winners (7 titles): 2007, 2008, 2009, 2010, 2011, 2013, 2018
- Dublin Senior B Hurling Championship: Winners (1 title): 2012
- Dublin Senior Camogie Championship Winners (10 titles): 1999, 2000, 2001, 2006, 2008, 2010, 2011, 2012, 2013, 2014
- Dublin Ladies' Senior Football Championship Winners (10 titles): 2000, 2001, 2002, 2003, 2004, 2005, 2006, 2007, 2008, 2010

=== Dublin Senior League Division 1 Titles ===
- Dublin Senior Football League Division 1 Winners (6 titles): 1995, 2003, 2016, 2023, 2025, 2026
- Dublin Senior Hurling League Division 1 Winners (11 titles): 1993, 1999, 2004, 2007, 2009, 2012, 2013, 2017, 2018, 2023, 2026
- Dublin Senior Camogie League Division 1 Winners (4 titles): 1999, 2001, 2009, 2010
- Dublin Senior Ladies' Football League Division 1 Winners (9 titles): 2000, 2001, 2002, 2003, 2004, 2005, 2008, 2009, 2010

=== Leinster Senior Championship Titles ===
- Leinster Senior Club Football Championship Winners (3): 2015–16, 2019-20, 2025
- Leinster Senior Club Hurling Championship Runners-Up (2): 2007–08, 2018-19
- Leinster Ladies' Senior Club Football Championship Winners (6): 2001, 2002, 2004, 2005, 2006, 2007

=== All-Ireland Championship Titles ===
- All-Ireland Senior Club Football Championship Winners (1): 2015-16
- All-Ireland Ladies' Club Football Championship Winners (2): 2004, 2005

=== Other Titles ===
==== Intermediate ====
- Dublin Intermediate Football Championship Winners (1): 1971
- Dublin Intermediate Football All County Championship Winners (3): 2022, 2023, 2025
- Dublin Intermediate Hurling Championship Winners (3): 1974, 1996, 1997

==== Junior ====
- Dublin Junior B Football Championship Winners (1): 2011
- Dublin Junior C Football Championship Winners (2): 2004, 2012
- Dublin Junior Hurling Championship Winners (3): 1973, 1988, 2000
- Dublin Junior B Hurling Championship winners (1): 1996
- Dublin Junior C Hurling Championship Winners (1): 2015
- Dublin Junior E Hurling Championship Winners (1): 2015

==== Under 21 ====
- Dublin Under 21 Football Championship Winners (5): 1995, 1997, 2003, 2014, 2023, 2024
- Dublin Under 21 Hurling Championship Winners (10): 1996, 1997, 1999, 2000, 2003, 2006, 2007, 2010, 2011, 2013

==== Minor ====
- Dublin Minor A Football Championship Winners (8): 1990, 1993, 1996, 1998, 2002, 2010, 2021, 2023
- Dublin Minor B Football Championship Winners (2): 1994, 2000
- Dublin Minor D Football Championship Winners (1): 2012
- Dublin Minor E Football Championship Winners (1): 2011
- Dublin Minor A Hurling Championship Winners (10): 1994, 1995, 1996, 1997, 1999, 2000, 2001, 2006, 2008, 2013
- Dublin Minor B Hurling Championship Winners (1): 2008
- Dublin Minor C Hurling Championship Winners (2): 2003, 2015
- Dublin Minor D Hurling Championship Winners (2): 2013, 2016
- Dublin Minor E Hurling Championship Winners (1): 2008

== Notable players ==
=== Senior inter-county men's footballers ===
Dublin

- Colm Basquel
- Paul Bealin
- Seán Doherty
- Darren Homan
- Conal Keaney
- Michael Darragh MacAuley
- Ciarán Maher
- Eric Miller
- Colin Moran
- Robbie McDaid
- Brian Stynes
- David Stynes

Armagh

- Enda McNulty

Donegal

- Paul Durcan

=== Senior inter-county hurlers ===
Dublin

- David Curtin
- Conor Dooley
- Shane Durkin
- Stephen Hiney
- Conal Keaney
- Simon Lambert
- Gary Maguire
- Conor McCormack
- David O'Callaghan
- Paudie O'Neill
- Paul Ryan

Wexford

- Malachy Travers

=== Senior inter-county camogie players ===
Dublin

- Ciara Lucey
- Emer Lucey
- Rachel Ruddy

=== Senior inter-county ladies' footballers ===
Dublin

- Rachel Ruddy

=== Professional Australian rules footballers ===
Brisbane Lions

- James Madden

Melbourne

- Jim Stynes

== Managers ==
Football

*	Temporary charge

Manager	Years
—N/a	1969–2000s?
Liam O'Dwyer	2009–2012
Conor Deegan	2013–2014
Andy McEntee	2014–2016
John O'Brien	2016–2017
Shane Brooks	2017
Anthony Rainbow	2017–2021
Kenny Naughton	2022–2024
Eamon O'Reilly	2025–Present

Hurling

Manager	Years
—N/a	1969–2000s?
Joe Fortune	c. 2018?–2020
Malachy Travers	2020–present
