= Paul Ryan (hurler) =

Irish hurler

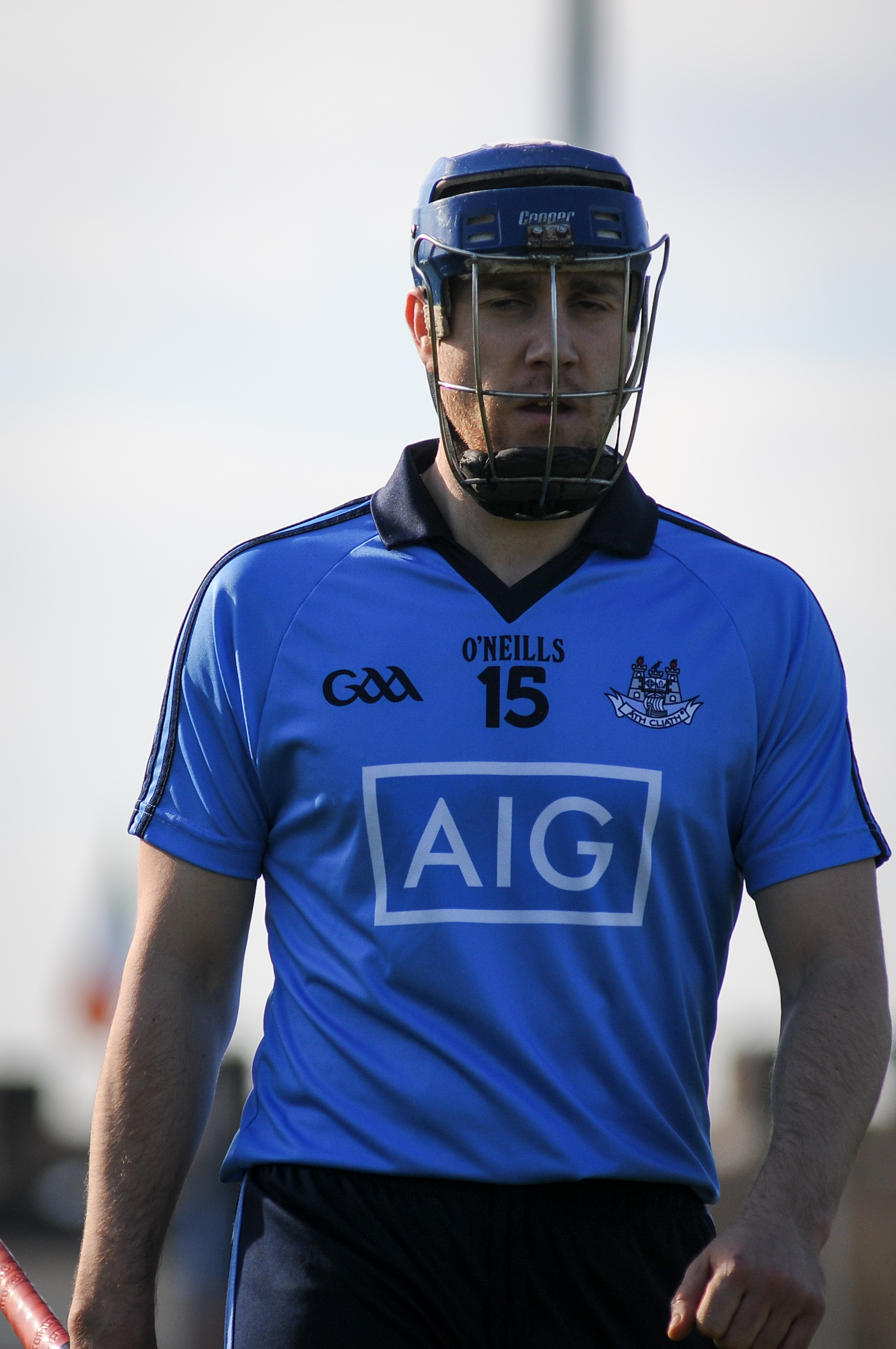

Personal information
- Native name: Pól Ó Riain (Irish)
- Born: 3 November 1988 (age 37) Dublin, Ireland
- Occupation: Sales Executive
- Height: 1.85 m (6 ft 1 in)

Sport
- Sport: Hurling
- Position: Full-forward
Club
- Years: Club
- 2006–present: Ballyboden St Enda's
Club titles
- Dublin titles: 7
College
- Years: College
- Dublin Institute of Technology
College titles
- Fitzgibbon titles: 0
Inter-county*
Years	County	Apps (scores)
2008–2021	Dublin	38 (8-188)
Inter-county titles
- Leinster titles: 1
- All-Irelands: 0
- NHL: 1
- All Stars: 0
- *Inter County team apps and scores correct as of 13:54, 16 June 2019.

Paul Ryan (born 3 November 1988) is an Irish hurler who plays as a full-forward for the Dublin senior team.

Born in Dublin, Ryan first played competitive hurling with the combined Dublin Colleges team, winning an All-Ireland medal in 2006. He simultaneously came to prominence at juvenile and underage levels with the Ballyboden St Enda's club, winning a minor championship medal in 2006. Ryan subsequently joined the Ballyboden St Enda's senior team and has since won six county senior championship medals.

Ryan made his debut on the inter-county scene at the age of seventeen when he was selected for the Dublin minor team. He enjoyed one unsuccessful championship season with the minor team. He subsequently joined the Dublin under-21 team. Ryan made his senior debut during the 2008 league and has since become a regular member of the team, winning Leinster and National League medals.

== Playing career ==
=== Dublin Colleges ===
During the 2005-06 Leinster Championship, Ryan was selected for the amalgamated Dublin Colleges team. On 18 March 2006, he top scored for the team with 0-04 from full-forward when Dublin Colleges suffered a 1–14 to 2–09 defeat by Kilkenny CBS in the final. On 1 May 2006, Ryan won an All-Ireland medal after scoring 0–06 in a 1–11 to 0–11 defeat of St. Flannan's College in the final.

=== Dublin Institute of Technology ===
Ryan studied at the Dublin Institute of Technology and joined the senior hurling team in his second year. He was a regular player in the forwards in various Fitzgibbon Cup and Walsh Cup campaigns.

=== Ballyboden St Enda's ===
Ryan joined the Ballyboden St Enda's club at a young age and played in all grades at juvenile and underage levels. On 20 November 2006, he top scored with 1-06 when Ballyboden defeated Na Fianna by 4–13 to 1–08 to win the Dublin Minor Championship.

Ryan was added to the Ballyboden St. Enda's senior team during the 2006 Dublin Senior Championship. On 1 October 2006, he was introduced as a substitute when Ballyboden suffered a 2–10 to 2–08 by Craobh Chiaráin in the final.

On 26 October 2007, Ryan was named on the bench when Ballyboden St Enda's faced St Vincent's in the Dublin Senior Championship final. He remained as a non-playing substitute but ended the game with a winners' medal following a 2–13 to 1–05 victory.

Ryan became a key member of the starting fifteen during the 2008 Dublin Senior Championship and was at right corner-forward when Ballyboden faced Kilmacud Crokes in the final. He scored 0-03, including two points from frees, in the 0–17 to 0–07 victory.

On 1 November 2009, Ryan was selected at right corner-forward when Ballyboden St Enda's faced Craobh Chiaráin in the Dublin Senior Championship final. He scored 1-11 from frees and general play and collected a third successive winners' medal following the 1–16 to 0–12 victory.

An injury ruled Ryan out of the Ballyboden St Enda's team that faced St Vincent's in the 2010 Dublin Senior Championship final on 31 October 2010. In spite of this, he claimed a fourth successive winners' medal as a non-playing substitute following the 3–17 to 1–10 victory.

On 30 October 2011, Ryan lined out at right corner-forward when Ballyboden St Enda's played in a sixth successive final. He scored 1-03 from frees and collected a fifth successive winners' medal after the 3–12 to 0–09 defeat of O'Toole's.

Six titles in-a-row proved beyond Ballyboden; however, the team were back in another final on 10 November 2013. Ryan top scored with 0-06 from left corner-forward and won a sixth championship medal following a 0–13 to 0–10 defeat of Lucan Sarsfields.

On 28 October 2018, Ryan lined out in his eighth Dublin Senior Championship final. Lining out at left corner-forward, he scored 1–05 in the 2–15 to 1–15 defeat of Kilmacud Crokes. On 2 December 2018, Ryan scored 0-05 from frees when Ballyboden suffered a 2–21 to 0–11 defeat by Ballyhale Shamrocks in the Leinster final.

=== Dublin ===
==== Minor and under-21 ====
Ryan first lined out for Dublin as a member of the minor team during the 2006 Leinster Championship. He made his first appearance for the team on 15 April 2006 when he lined out at left corner-forward in a 1–18 to 1–09 defeat by Kilkenny. Ryan's minor career ended on 24 June 2006 when he top scored for Dublin with 0–05 in a 2–14 to 0–08 defeat by Kilkenny.

Ryan joined the Dublin under-21 team in advance of the 2008 Leinster Championship. He made his first appearance for the team on 28 May 2008 when he lined out at left wing-forward in an 0–18 to 1–12 defeat of Laois. He played his last game in the grade on 26 June 2008 in a 1–20 to 1–11 defeat by Kilkenny.

==== Senior ====
Ryan was added to the Dublin senior panel prior to the start of the 2008 National League. He made his first appearance for the team on 10 February 2008 when he was introduced as a 51st-minute substitute for Kevin Flynn in a 0–22 to 0–15 defeat of Antrim. Ryan made his Leinster Championship debut on 22 June 2008 when he came on as a 63rd-minute substitute in 2–15 to 1–15 defeat by Wexford.

On 8 January 2009 it was announced that Ryan had opted out of the Dublin panel for the 2009 season. He spent the summer travelling abroad, however, he returned to the Dublin panel in advance of the 2010 National League.

On 1 May 2011, Ryan lined out at left corner-forward in the National League final against Kilkenny. He top scored with 0-09, including five frees, and ended the game with a winners' medal following a 1–22 to 1–07 victory. On 3 July 2011, Ryan lined out at left corner-forward when Dublin faced Kilkenny in the Leinster final. He ended the game as Dublin's top scorer with 1-09, however, he also ended on the losing side following a 4–17 to 1–15 defeat. Ryan ended the season by being nominated for an All-Star.

On 7 July 2013, Ryan lined out at left corner-forward when Dublin faced Galway in the Leinster final. He top scored with 2–07 as Dublin claimed their first Leinster Championship title in 52 years following a 2–25 to 2–13 victory. Ryan ended the season by receiving a second All-Star nomination.

On 6 July 2014, Ryan was selected as a substitute when Dublin faced Kilkenny in the Leinster final. He scored a point after being introduced as a 41st-minute substitute for Danny Sutcliffe in the 0–24 to 1–09 defeat.

On 7 November 2016, Ryan failed to be included on Dublin's winter training panel ahead of the 2017 season. He later clarified that it was his own choice not to commit to the team for the upcoming year instead of being dropped. Ryan returned to the panel under new manager Pat Gilroy in 2018.

== Career statistics ==
Team	Year	National League			Leinster		All-Ireland		Total	
Team	Year	Division	Apps	Score	Apps	Score	Apps	Score	Apps	Score
Dublin	2008	Division 1A	3	0-01	1	0-00	1	0-02	5	0-03
Dublin	2009	Division 1	—		—		—		—	
Dublin	2010	Division 1	5	1-07	2	0-02	1	0-01	8	1-10
Dublin	2011	Division 1	8	2-26	3	2-30	2	0-17	13	4-73
Dublin	2012	Division 1A	5	1-37	2	0-13	1	0-09	8	1-59
Dublin	2013	Division 1B	5	2-30	5	3-26	1	0-06	11	5-62
Dublin	2014	Division 1A	3	1-04	2	0-04	1	0-02	6	1-10
Dublin	2015	Division 1A	6	0-30	2	0-07	3	0-22	11	0-59
Dublin	2016	Division 1A	1	0-01	2	0-02	1	0-04	4	0-07
Dublin	2017	Division 1A	—		—		—		—	
Dublin	2018	Division 1B	4	0-10	4	3-21	—		8	3-31
Dublin	2019	Division 1B	3	0-08	3	0-20	1	0-00	7	0-28
Dublin	2020	Division 1B	3	0-13	0	0-00	0	0-00	3	0-13
Total			46	7-158	26	8-125	12	0-63	84	15-346

== Honours ==
Dublin Colleges

- Dr. Croke Cup (1): 2006

Ballyboden St Enda's

- Dublin Senior Hurling Championship (7): 2007, 2008, 2009, 2010, 2011, 2013, 2018
- Dublin Minor Hurling Championship (1): 2006

Dublin

- Leinster Senior Hurling Championship (1): 2013
- National Hurling League (1): 2011

Leinster

- Railway Cup (1): 2012
