= List of Dublin senior hurling team captains =

This article lists players who have captained the Dublin county hurling team in the Leinster Senior Hurling Championship (SHC) and the All-Ireland Senior Hurling Championship (SHC).

== List of captains ==
Year	Player	Club	National titles	Provincial titles
1996	John Twomey	Erins Isle		
1997	Conor McCann	Faughs		
1998	Conor McCann	Faughs		
1999	Sean Power	Commercials		
2000	Sean Power	Commercials		
2003	David Sweeney	Ballyboden St Enda's		
2004	Kevin Flynn	O'Tooles		
2005	David Curtin	Ballyboden St Enda's		
2006	Philip Brennan	O'Tooles		
2007	Philip Brennan	O'Tooles		
2008	Stephen Hiney	Ballyboden St Enda's		
2009	Stephen Hiney	Ballyboden St Enda's		
2010	Stephen Hiney	Ballyboden St Enda's		
2011	John McCaffrey	Lucan Sarsfields		Leinster SHC-winning captain
2012	John McCaffrey	Lucan Sarsfields		
2013	John McCaffrey	Lucan Sarsfields		
2014	John McCaffrey	Lucan Sarsfields		
2015	Liam Rushe	St Patrick's, Palmerstown		
2016	Liam Rushe	St Patrick's, Palmerstown		
2017	Liam Rushe	St Patrick's, Palmerstown		
2018	Chris Crummey	Lucan Sarsfields		
2019	Chris Crummey	Lucan Sarsfields		
2020	Danny Sutcliffe	St Jude's		
2021	Danny Sutcliffe	St Jude's		
2022	Eoghan O'Donnell	Whitehall Colmcille		
