= Dublin Blue Stars =

The Dublin Bus/Evening Herald Dubs Stars Football/Hurling are the players chosen as the top Gaelic football and hurling players in their given position in the year that the Blue stars awards are awarded. The Dublin Blue Stars are a similar award to the GAA All Stars Awards which are awarded annually by the Gaelic Athletic Association. Dublin traditionally play against the Blue stars team in a challenge match, which proves to be an opportunity to see and try out new players for the Dublin football and Hurling teams.

The 2006 Blues Star football challenge match ended with Dublin winning the game by a scoreline of 3–17 to 0–12. The 2006 Blue Star Hurling match was also won by Dublin, the game finished on a scoreline of 2–19 to 0–10. Both 2007 Blue Stars games finished level at full-time and both games were forced into penalties and the Blue Stars won on both occasions.

== 2007 Football Blue Stars Winners ==
=== Goalkeeper ===
- Michael Savage (St Vincent's)

=== Full backs ===
- Paul Griffin (Kilmacud Crokes)
- Martin Cahill (St Brigid's)
- Paul Conlon (St Vincent's)

=== Half backs ===
- Chris Guckian (St Jude's)
- Kevin Nolan (Kilmacud Crokes)
- Ger Brennan (St Vincent's)

=== Midfield ===
- Michael O'Shea (St Vincent's)
- Ken Darcy (St Brigid's)

=== Half forwards ===
- Brendan McMenamin (St Jude's)
- Mark Vaughan (Kilmacud Crokes)
- Gareth Smith (St Oliver Plunkett's/ER)

=== Full forwards ===
- Kevin Bonner (St Brigid's)
- Tomás Quinn (St Vincent's)
- Bernard Brogan (St Oliver Plunkett's/ER)

=== Substitutes ===
- Dan Nelligan (Kilmacud Crokes)
- Eoin Brady (St Vincent's)
- Paul Brogan (St Oliver Plunketts/ER)
- Barry Cahill (St Brigid's)
- Paddy Andrews (St Brigid's)
- Kevin McMenamin (St Jude's)

== 2006 Football Blue Stars ==
- Stephen Gallagher (UCD)
- Willie Lowry (St Vincent's)
- Paddy Navin (UCD)
- John McCarthy (UCD)
- P. Griffin (Kilmacud Crokes)
- G. Brennan (St Vincent's)
- C. Goggins (Ballinteer St John's)
- P. Gilroy (St Vincent's)
- Sean Brady (UCD)
- B. Sheehan (UCD)
- A. Brogan (St Oliver Plunkett's/ER)
- A. O'Malley (UCD)
- D. Connolly (St Vincent's)
- T. Quinn (St Vincent's)
- B. Brogan (St Oliver Plunkett's/ER)

=== Substitutes ===
- P. Copeland (St Jude's)
- Brian Kirby (Thomas Davis)
- Micheal Lyons (St Jude's)
- D. Murray (Round Towers, Clondalkin)
- Tommy Brennan (Lucan Sarsfields)
- M. Davoren (Kilmacud Crokes)
- D. Farrell (Na Fianna)

== 2007 Hurling Blue Stars ==
=== Goalkeeper ===
- G. Maguire (Ballyboden St Enda's)

=== Full backs ===
- Cathal Ryan (Ballyboden St Enda's)
- Stephen Perkins (Ballyboden St Enda's)
- Ruairí Trainor (St Vincent's)

=== Half backs ===
- S. Hiney (Ballyboden St Enda's)
- Rónán Fallon (St Vincent's)
- T. Brady (North Dublin 2, Na Fianna)

=== Midfielders ===
- Malachy Travers (Ballyboden St Enda's)
- A. McCrabbe (Craobh Chiaráin)

=== Half forwards ===
- Dave Sweeney (Ballyboden St Enda's)
- Damien Russell (St Vincent's)
- Michael Griffin (Ballyboden St Enda's)

=== Full forwards ===
- Fintan Clandillon (Lucan Sarsfields)
- C. Keaney (Ballyboden St Enda's)
- Kevin Flynn (O'Toole's)

=== Substitutes ===
- Alan Nolan (St Brigid's)
- Cronan Dooley (Lucan Sarsfields)
- Tom Russell (St Vincent's)
- Tim Sweeney (Ballyboden St Enda's)
- Michael Carton (O'Toole's)
- James Doody (Ballyboden St Enda's)

== 2006 Hurling Blue Stars ==
- A. Nolan (St Brigid's)
- Tom Russell (St Vincent's)
- Stephen Perkins (Ballyboden St Enda's)
- Cathal Ryan (Ballyboden St Enda's)
- D. O'Reilly (Craobh Chiaráin)
- R. Fallon (St Vincent's)
- David Kirwan (Craobh Chiaráin)
- Damien Russell (St Vincent's)
- Johnny McGuirk (Craobh Chiaráin)
- A. McCrabbe (Craobh Chiaráin)
- D. Curtin (Ballyboden St Enda's)
- D. Connolly (St Vincent's)
- D. O'Callaghan (St Mark's)
- Ger Ennis (Craobh Chiaráin)
- K. Flynn (O'Toole's)

=== Substitute awards ===
- Stephen Chester (Craobh Chiaráin)
- Cormac de Frein (Kilmacud Crokes)
- Kevin Ryan (O'Toole's)
- Fergal Armstrong (Kilmacud Crokes)
- Eoghan Dunne (Cuala)
- K. O'Reilly (Lucan Sarsfields)
- M. Carton (O'Toole's)
