= 2009 Dublin Senior Hurling Championship =

Annual hurling competition season

Tournament details
- County: Dublin
- Year: 2009

Winners
- Champions: Ballyboden St. Enda's (3rd win)
- Manager: Liam Hogan
- Captain: Malachy Travers

The 2009 Dublin Senior Hurling Championship is a Dublin-based GAA club competition between the top clubs in Dublin Hurling.

== Round robin ==
=== Group A ===
Table	P	W	D	L	F	A	+/-	Pts
Ballyboden St Endas	3	3	0	0	8-66	1-44	+43	6
St Patrick's, Palmerstown	3	1	1	1	4-44	4-48	+23	3
Na Fianna	3	1	1	1	4-45	5-54	-13	3
Dublin North East	3	0	0	3	2-39	8-48	-27	0

==== Fixtures ====
August 28
First Round

Ballyboden St Endas	2-24 - 0-15	Na Fianna
S Durkin 0-5, S Lambert 1-2, P Ryan 0-4, D Sweeney, D Curtin (0-2f) 0-3 each, D O'Connor 1-0, C McCormack, E Carroll 0-2 each, S Perkins, T Sweeney, C Keaney 0-1 each.		Carroll 0-6 (0-5f, 0-1 65), B Courtney, D O Maoileidigh, P Prenderville 0-2 each, T Brady, N O Ceallachain, T Bergin 0-1 each.

Venue: Parnell Park
Referee: T Carton
(Naomh Fionnbarra)

August 29
First Round

St Patrick's, Palmerstown	2-14 - 0-10	Dublin North East
S Stapleton 1-8 (1-4f, 0-2 65, 0-2 sideline), L Rushe 1-2, R Carson 0-3, P Faughnan 0-1.		E McCabe 0-5 (0-3f), G Bennett, E Power, P McAllister, S Kelly, S Dempsey 0-1 each.

Venue: O'Toole Park
Referee: Eoin Mullarkey
(Lucan Sarsfields)

September 12
Second Round

Ballyboden St Endas	3-22 - 1-14	Dublin North East
P Ryan 0-6 (0-3f), C Keaney 1-2, S Durkin 0-4, D O’Connor 1-1, M Griffin, M Travers 0-3 each, C McCormack 1-0, N McMorrow 0-2, J Doody 0-1.		E McCabe 0-4 (0-3f), P Garbutt 1-1 (1-0 pen), D Henry 0-3, D Rooney 0-2, G Bennett (0-1f), P McAllister, D Harris, C Downey 0-1 each.

Venue: O'Toole Park
Referee: Eoin Mullarkey
(Lucan Sarsfields)

September 12
Second Round

Na Fianna	1-18 - 2-15	St Patrick's, Palmerstown
P Carroll 0-10 (0-6f, 0-1 sline), W Brogan 1-1, B Courtney 0-2, T Brady, M Quinn, D O Maoileidigh, N O Ceallachain, P Prenderville 0-1 each.		L Rushe 1-3, S Stapleton 0-5 (0-4f), P Faughnan 1-1, D Connolly 0-2, B O’Hanlon, D O’Hanlon, A Glennon, R Carson 0-1 each.

Venue: Parnell Park
Referee: E Walker
(O'Tooles)

September 26
Third Round

Ballyboden St Enda's	3-20 - 0-15	St Patrick's, Palmerstown
C Keaney 1-7 (1-4f), E Carroll, N McMorrow 1-4 each, M Travers 0-3 (0-2f), M Griffin 0-2.		S Stapleton 0-13 (10f, 0-1s, 0-1 65), D Connolly, L Rushe 0-1 each.

Venue: O'Toole Park
Referee: P Denieffe
(Round Towers, Clondalkin)

September 26
Third Round

Na Fianna	3-12 - 1-15	Dublin North East
R Freyne 2-0, P Carroll 0-6(0-2f, 0-1 65), D O Maleidigh 1-2, N O’Hara, T Bergin, P Prenderville, B Courtney 0-1 each.		P Garbutt 0-6 (0-1 65), E McCabe 1-1, E Power 0-2, D Markey, D Rooney, A Richardson, P Daly, C Downey, P McAllister 0-1 each.

Venue: Parnell Park
Referee: Eddie Walker
(St Judes)

=== Group B ===
Table	P	W	D	L	F	A	+/-	Pts
Kilmacud Crokes	3	2	1	0	7-37	1-24	+29	5
Craobh Chiaráin	3	2	1	0	8-35	3-28	+22	5
Cuala	3	0	1	2	4-30	8-32	-14	1
Dublin North West	3	0	1	2	2-28 (18)	9-46 (57)	-39	1

==== Fixtures ====
August 29
First Round

Craobh Chiaráin	4-08 - 2-13	Cuala
A McCrabbe 1-6 (1-3f), K Elliot, F Usanga, C English 1-0 each, D OReilly (1f), P O’Boyle (1f) 0-1 each.		S Murphy 1-4, E Dunne 1-3 (0-2), D Treacy 0-3, E Cronin 0-2, B Brown 0-1.

Venue: Parnell Park
Referee: T Lambe
(St Vincents)

August 29
First Round

Kilmacud Crokes	3-19 - 1-07	Dublin North West
O’Loughlin 2-11 (0-8f, 0-1 65), F Armstrong 1-2, H Gannon, Ross O’Carroll 0-2 each, A Cleary, J Burke 0-1 each.		C O’Connor 0-4 (0-3f, 0-1 pen), D De Burca 1-0, K Robinson 0-2 (2f), S McDermott 0-1(1f).

Venue: Parnell Park
Referee: Pat Denniffe
(Round Towers, Clondalkin)

September 10
Second Round

Craobh Chiaráin	4-17 - 0-08	Dublin North West
D Keane 1-3, F Usanga, K Warren 1-2, P O’Boyle (0-3f), K Ryan 0-3 each, J McGuirk 1-0, R Mahon 0-2, D Shanley, S McDonald 0-1.		S Mullen (0-1f), C O’Connor 0 2 each, R Whelan, S Walsh, D Breathnach, A Baird 0-1 each.

Venue: Parnell Park
Referee: Tony Lambe
(St Vincents)

September 13
Second Round

Cuala	0-07 - 3-11	Kilmacud Crokes
S O’Brien, S Murphy (0-1f), L Hand, D Treacy, O Ryan, C Sheanon 0-1 each.		K O’Loughlin 1-6 (0-4f), R Walsh 1-1, J Burke 1-0, Ross O’Carroll 0-2, S Gillan, A Cleary 0-1 each.

Venue: O'Toole Park
Referee: Pat Denieffe
(Round Towers, Clondalkin)

September 26
Third Round

Cuala	2-10 - 1-13	Dublin North West
S Murphy 0-5 (0-4f), D Treacy 1-1, D Cunningham 1-0, E Cronin 0-2, S O’Brien, C Sheanon 0-1.		C O’Connor (0-2f), S Mullen (0-4f) 0-6 each, J Buckley 1-1.

Venue: Parnell Park
Referee: M Butler
(Kilmacud Crokes)

September 26
Third Round

Kilmacud Crokes	1-07 - 0-10	Craobh Chiaráin
K O’Loughlin 0-4 (0-2f, 0-1 65), J Burke 1-0, R O’Carroll 0-2, R Walsh 0-1.		A McCrabbe 0-7 (0-5f, 0-1 sline), J McGuirk, D Kelly, G Ennis 0-1.

Venue: Parnell Park
Referee: E Morris
(St Finian's, Swords)

=== Group C ===
Table	P	W	D	L	F	A	+/-	Pts
O'Tooles	3	3	0	0	3-50	4-38	+9	6
Lucan Sarsfields	3	2	0	1	9-38	5-39	+11	4
St Judes	3	1	0	2	3-37	8-24	+04	2
Dublin South West	3	0	0	3	7-29	5-53	-20	0

==== Fixtures ====
August 29
First Round

O'Tooles	1-21 - 1-16	Lucan Sarsfields
Flynn 0-13 (0-9f, 0-2 65), P Carton 1-0, G O’Meara, M Cunningham, A Morris 0-2, B McLoughlin (0-1f), D Farrelly 0-1.		T Somers 1-9 (0-6f, 0-1 65), P Kelly 0-3, P O’Driscoll 0-2, J McCaffrey (0-1f), A Duff 0-1 each.

Venue: O'Toole Park
Referee: T Quigley
(Kilmacud Crokes)

August 30
First Round

St Judes	1-18 - 2-08	Dublin South West
D Sutcliffe 1-3, K Nealon 0-6 (0-1f), S O’Connor 0-4 (0-1f), R Joyce 0-2, J Ryan, N Mangan, S Lehane 0-1 each.		D O’Callaghan 1-4 (0-4f), J Kelly 1-2, E Walsh, D Murphy 0-1 each.

Venue: O'Toole Park
Referee: D Ryan
(St Patrick's, Palmerstown)

September 10
Second Round

O'Tooles	2-10 - 1-11	St Judes
K Flynn 0-6 (0-4f 0-1 65), B McLoughlin (1-0 pen), P Bradshaw 1-0 each, M Cunningham 0-2, G O’Meara, Peadar Carton 0-1 each.		S OConnor 0-6 (0-5f), S Lehane 1-0, J Ryan, R Joyce 0-2, R O’Brien 0-1.

Venue: Parnell Park
Referee: D Harrington
(Naomh Mearnóg)

September 12
Second Round

Lucan Sarsfields	4-16 - 3-10	Dublin South West
T Somers 0-8 (0-4f, 0-2 65, 0-1 sline), P Brennan 2-0, A Roche 1-4, P Kelly 1-2, J McCaffrey 0-2.		D OCallaghan, N Fleming 1-1 each, M Breathnach 1-0 (1-0 pen), D Murphy 0-3 (0-2f, 0-1 65), B McLaughlin 0-2, E Young, M Small, C McInerney 0-1 each.

Venue: O'Toole Park
Referee: Gerard Delaney
(Faughs)

September 27
Third Round

O'Tooles	0-19 - 2-11	Dublin South West
M Carton 0-5, A Morris 0-4 (0-2f), Peadar Carton 0-3, P O’Donoghue, Paddy Carton 0-2, C White, D Webster, G O’Meara 0-1 each.		D Murphy (0-5f), J Kelly 0-5, D O’Callaghan, E Walsh 1-0, B McLaughlin 0-1.

Venue: O'Toole Park
Referee: Ger Delaney
(Faughs)

=== Group D ===
Table	P	W	D	L	F	A	+/-	Pts
St Vincents	3	3	0	0	6-46	4-26	+26	6
Crumlin	3	1	1	1	7-35	6-31	+07	3
Faughs	3	1	1	1	5-34	3-35	+06	3
Dublin South East	3	0	0	3	3-19	8-43	-35	0

==== Fixtures ====
August 28
First Round

St Vincents	1-21 - 1-16	Dublin South East
S Loughlin 3-3, D Russell 0-7 (0-4f), D Connolly 0-3, C McBride 1-0, N Bishop 0-2, D Higgins 0-1.		A Quinlan 0-3 (0-3f), J Gilligan 1-0, F Chambers 0-2, S Coleman 0-1.

Venue: O'Toole Park
Referee: D O'Donovan
(St Marks)

August 30
First Round

Crumlin	2-13 - 3-10	Faughs
P Elliott 1-7 (0-7f), S Martin 1-2, R Potts 0-2 (0-1 65), S Cullen, C Gough 0-1 each.		C Heavey 2-1, J Small 0-5 (0-4f), P Donohue 1-0, C McCann 0-2, M Connolly, C Brennan 0-1 each.

Venue: O'Toole Park
Referee: M Butler
(Kilmacud Crokes)

September 12
Second Round

St Vincents	0-14 - 1-09	Faughs
T McGrane 0-5 (0-5f), D Connolly 0-3, R Fallon 0-2, S O’Neill, D Russell (0-1 65), C Meehan, S Loughlin 0-1 each.		C Brennan 1-1, J Small 0-4 (0-3f, 0-1 65), M Ryan 0-2 (0-2f), C Crowley, K O’Brien 0-1.

Venue: O'Toole Park
Referee: Fergus McGreevey
(St Oliver Plunkett's/Eoghan Ruadh)

September 13
Second Round

Crumlin	3-11 - 1-05	Dublin South East
P Elliott 1-6 (0-5f), R Elliott 1-1, D Whelan 1-0, R Potts, S Cullen, S Stafford, P Purtell 0-1 each.		James Gilligan 1-1 (1-0f, 0-1f), J Sadlier, S Hilliard, D O’Dwyer, M Kiely 0-1 each.

Venue: Kiltipper Road
Referee: Fergus McGreevey
(St Oliver Plunketts/Eoghan Ruadh)

September 26
Third Round

Crumlin	2-11 - 2-16	St Vincents
P Elliott 0-7 (0-6f), S Stafford, D Whelan 1-0 each, R Potts 0-2, J Cullen, S Cullen 0-1 each.		T McGrane 0-7(0-5f), D Russell 0-4, D Connolly, C McBride 1-0 each, D Higgins 0-2, D Qualter, R Fallon, C Fallon 0-1 each.

Venue: Parnell Park
Referee: Dave O'Donovan
(St Mark's)

September 26
Third Round

Faughs	1-16 - 1-08	Dublin South East
J Small 0-8 (0-8f), C Brennan 1-0, C McCann (0-2f), C Heavey, M Ryan, J Heneghan 0-2 each.		D MacMathuna 0-7 (0-6f), M Kiely 1-0, J Sadlier 0-1.

Venue: O'Toole Park
Referee: E McSuibhne
(St Jude's)

== Quarter finals ==
October 9
Quarter Final

St Vincents	0-11 - 2-10	Craobh Chiaráin
T McGrane 0-7 (0-6f), C Billings, D Qualter, C McBride, N Bishop 0-1 each.		A McCrabbe 1-7 (0-2f, 0-2 65), P O’Boyle 1-0, K Warren, D Keane, C English 0-1 each.

Venue: Parnell Park
Referee: D O'Donovan
(St Mark's)

October 10

Ballyboden St Endas	0-22 - 0-10	Crumlin
D Sweeney (0-1 sline), C Keaney (0-3f), D Curtin (0-3f) 0-4 each, P Ryan 0-3 (0-1f, 0-1 65), M Travers (0-1f), N McMorrow 0-2 each, P Buckeridge, E Carroll, M Griffin 0-1 each.		P Elliott 0-7 (0-7f), D Whelan, P Purtell, R Elliott 0-1 each.

Venue: O'Toole Park
Referee: E Morris
(St Finian's, Sword's)

October 9
Quarter Final
Quarter Final

O'Tooles	3-16 - 0-14	St Patrick's Palmerstown
K Flynn 2-7 (0-2f, 0-1 65), L Ryan 1-0, Patrick Carton, A Morris (0-1f), P O’Donoghue 0-2 each, P Brennan, Peadar Carton, G Morris 0-1 each.		L Rushe 0-6, A Glennon, S Stapleton (0-3f) 0-3 each, D O’Hanlon, R Carson 0-1 each.

Venue: Parnell Park
Referee: T Carton
(Naomh Fionnbarra)

October 10
Quarter Final

Kilmacud Crokes	1-10 - 1-20	Lucan Sarsfields
T Somers 1-9 (0-8f), K OReilly 0-4 (0-2f, 0-1 65), A Roche, P Brennan 0-2 each, P ODriscoll, P Kelly, A Duff 0-1 each.		K OLoughlin 0-8 (0-7), B ORorke 1-0, H Gannon, F Armstrong 0-1 each.

Venue: O'Toole Park
Referee: F McGreevey
(St Oliver Plunketts/Eoghan Ruadh)

== Semi finals ==
The semi finals will feature O'Tooles, Lucan Sarsfields, Ballyboden St Enda's and Craobh Chiaráin.

October 25

Ballyboden St Endas	1-16 - 2-13	O'Tooles
P Ryan 0-8 (0-7f, 0-1 65), S Lambert 1-2, D Sweeney 0-3, D Curtin, C Keaney, N McMorrow, E Carroll 0-1 each.		K Flynn 1-0 (1-0 pen), A Morris (0-2f), B McLoughlin (0-3f) 0-3 each, L Ryan 0-2, G O’Meara, D Farrelly 0-1 each.

Venue: Parnell Park
Referee: T Lambe
(St Vincent's)

October 28

Ballyboden St Endas	1-17 - 1-10	O'Tooles
P Ryan 0-7 (0-6f), D Sweeney 1-3, D Curtin, N McMorrow 0-2 each, S Lambert, S Durkin 0-1 each.		G Morris 1-3, K Flynn 0-4 (0-2f), B McLoughlin 1-0 (1-0f), P Carton 0-2, M Carton, D Farrelly, M Cunningham, A Morris 0-1 each.

Venue: Parnell Park
Referee: D O’Donovan
(St Mark's)

October 24

Craobh Chiaráin	2-06 - 1-08	Lucan Sarsfields
A McCrabbe 0-4 (0-2 slines, 0-2f), D Keane, S McDonald 1-0 each, D Kelly, P OBoyle 0-1 each.		T Somers 1-3 (1-3f), K OReilly 0-2 (0-1 65, 0-1f), J McCaffrey, B Aird 0-1 each.

Venue: Parnell Park
Referee: T Quigley
(Kilmacud Crokes)

== Dublin Senior Club Hurling Final ==
Ballyboden St Endas	1-16 - 0-12 (final score after 60 minutes)	Craobh Chiaráin
Manager: Liam Hogan Team: G. Maguire; J. Duffy; S. Perkins; A. Ryan; M. Travers; D. Spain; T. Sweeney; S. Durkin; D. O'Connor; D. Sweeney; D. Curtin; C. Keaney; P. Ryan; S. Lambert; N. McMorrow Substitutes: M. O'Sullivan for A. Ryan (51); E. Carroll for McMorrow (57); M. Griffin for O'Connor (58); J. Doody for T. Sweeney (58); B. Kennedy for Curtin (64)	Half-time: 0-09 - 0-07 Competition: Dublin Senior Hurling Championship (Final) Date: 16.00 BST; Sunday, November 1, 2009 Venue: Parnell Park, Dublin Attendance: Referee:Eoin Mullarkey (Lucan Sarsfields) Match rules: 60 minutes. Replay if scores still level. Maximum of 5 substitutions.	Manager: Dave Kelly Team: S Chester; Damien OReilly; E Farrell; D Shanley; D Kelly; Derek OReilly; G Kelly; K Elliott; A McCrabbe; P OBoyle; K McGuirk; D Kirwan; K Warren; D Keane; S McDonald. Substitutes: F Usanga for Keane (52); J Ryan for Shanley (53)..

== See also ==
- Dublin Senior Hurling Championship 2006
- Dublin Senior Hurling Championship 2009
