= 2006 Dublin Senior Football Championship =

Tournament details
- County: Dublin
- Year: 2006

Winners
- Champions: UCD (6th win)
- Manager: Malachy O'Rourke

Promotion/Relegation
- Promoted team(s): St Peregrines
- Relegated team(s): St Brigids B

The 2006 Dublin Senior Football Championship was an edition of an annual Gaelic football competition organized by the Dublin County Board of the Gaelic Athletic Association in Ireland. The competition used a modified knockout format. The previous champions in 2005 were Kilmacud Crokes, who were knocked out of the 2006 competition at the semi-final stage. UCD finished the 2006 championship as Dublin champions, by beating St Vincents in the final.

== Rounds 1-4 ==
=== Round 1 ===
The winners of their respective first-round games went on to qualify for the second round, the losers were given a second chance in a backdoor system which gave them a place in the third round when they won their backdoor tie.

Game	Date	Venue	Winner	Score	Loser	Score
Dublin SFC; First Round	20 April	Parnell Park	St Marks	1-18	Trinity Gaels	1-9
Dublin SFC; First Round	20 April	Parnell Park	St Sylvesters	2-09	St Marys	0-14
Dublin SFC; First Round	21 April	Parnell Park	Erins Isle	2-6	St Maurs	0-7
Dublin SFC; First Round	21 April	Parnell Park	Ballymun Kickhams	1-9	Naomh Olaf	0-11
Dublin SFC; First Round	22 April	Naul	Naomh Mearnóg	2-15	Erins Hope	1-13
Dublin SFC; First Round	22 April	Naul	St Brigids A	5-8	St Brigids B	1-6
Dublin SFC; First Round	22 April	Parnell Park	St Vincents	1-14	Fingallians	1-5
Dublin SFC; First Round	22 April	Parnell Park	Raheny	0-10	Na Fianna	0-10
Dublin SFC; First Round Replay	25 April	Parnell Park	Raheny	2-6	Na Fianna	0-7
Dublin SFC; First Round	22 April	O'Toole Park	Ballinteer St. Johns	1-12	Whitehall Colmcille	0-8
Dublin SFC; First Round	22 April	O'Toole Park	Lucan Sarsfields	2-14	Naomh Barróg	0-9
Dublin SFC; First Round	22 April	O'Toole Park	Round Towers(Clondalkin)	1-13	Parnells	0-6
Dublin SFC; First Round	23 April	Parnell Park	UCD	1-12	Clontarf	1-8
Dublin SFC; First Round	23 April	Parnell Park	Kilmacud Crokes	1-17	Thomas Davis	0-5
Dublin SFC; First Round	23 April	O'Toole Park	St Oliver Plunketts	3-9	O'Tooles	0-6
Dublin SFC; First Round	23 April	O'Toole Park	Ballyboden St Endas	3-7	Garda	0-7
Dublin SFC; First Round	23 April	O'Toole Park	St Judes	1-12	St Annes	1-6

=== Round 2 ===
==== Structure ====
All teams in Round two who lost in the first round were drawn against each other in the second round in a phase known as the second round backdoor system. The losers of these backdoor games were knocked out of the championship and went on to play in the relegation playoffs. The winning teams from round one were paired with each other. The losers of these round two games progressed to the third round and the winning teams skipped a round and went on directly to the fourth round.

==== The Games ====
The most notable fixture in this round was the defeat of Kilmacud Crokes by Round Towers. This made it more difficult for Kilmacud to retain their title, Kilmacud went straight to round 3 and Round Towers progressed to Round 4. Also, St Vincents and St Oliver Plunketts were forced to a replay. The replay saw the return of Alan Brogan to Dublin football after a few months on the sidelines. St Oliver Plunketts progressed to the fourth round and St Vincents had a tie against Parnells in the third round.

St Oliver Plunketts/Eoghan Ruadh, Ballymun Kickhams, UCD, Raheny, St Judes, St Brigids A, Ballyboden St Endas progressed to the fourth round as they won their respective second-round games and hadn't lost a game so far in the championship.

St Vincents, St Sylvesters, Lucan Sarsfields, Ballinteer St Johns, St Marks Naomh Mearnóg, Kilmacud Crokes and Erins Isle progressed to the third round despite losing their games as they were a winning team in the first round.

Thomas Davis, Parnells, O'Tooles, Garda, Na Fianna, Naomh Olaf, St Marys and St Annes progressed to the third round as they won their respective second round ties.

St Brigids 'B', Erins Hope, Whitehall Colmcille, Trinity Gaels, Clontarf, Naomh Barróg, Fingallians and St Maurs went on play to retain their senior status in the relegation section.

Game	Date	Venue	Winner	Score	Loser	Score
Dublin SFC; Second Round	9 May	Parnell Park	St Sylvesters	0-9	Ballymun Kickhams	0-9
Dublin SFC; Second Round Replay	15 May	Naul	Ballymun Kickhams	3-6	St Sylvesters	0-5
Dublin SFC; Second Round	9 May	Parnell Park	St Oliver Plunketts	1-15	St Vincents	1-15
Dublin SFC; Second Round Replay	24 May	Parnell Park	St Oliver Plunketts	0-11	St Vincents	0-9
Dublin SFC; Backdoor	9 May	Bohernabreena	Thomas Davis	2-18	St Brigids B	0-9
Dublin SFC; Second Round	9 May	O'Toole Park	UCD	1-11	Lucan Sarsfields	0-11
Dublin SFC; Second Round	10 May	O'Toole Park	Raheny	0-12	Ballinteer St. Johns	0-9
Dublin SFC; Backdoor	10 May	Balgriffin	Parnells	4-17	Erins Hope	0-7
Dublin SFC; Backdoor	10 May	Portmarnock	O'Tooles	1-7	Whitehall Colmcille	0-8
Dublin SFC; Second Round	10 May	Bohernabreena	St Judes	2-12	St Marks	0-10
Dublin SFC; Backdoor	10 May	Finglas	Garda	1-16	Trinity Gaels	1-11
Dublin SFC; Backdoor	10 May	Broomfield	Na Fianna	5-5	Clontarf	0-8
Dublin SFC; Second Round	10 May	Parnell Park	St Brigids A	3-10	Naomh Mearnóg	2-6
Dublin SFC; Second Round	10 May	Parnell Park	Round Towers(Clondalkin)	1-9	Kilmacud Crokes	0-11
Dublin SFC; Backdoor	11 May	O'Toole Park	Naomh Olaf	1-10	Naomh Barróg	0-10
Dublin SFC; Backdoor	11 May	Islandbridge	St Marys	1-17	Fingallians	1-8
Dublin SFC; Backdoor	13 May	O'Toole Park	St Annes	1-12	St Maurs	0-10
Dublin SFC; Second Round	14 May	Blakestown	Ballyboden St Endas	0-13	Erins Isle	0-8

=== Round 3 ===
==== Structure ====
This draw was restricted by a rule that did not allow two clubs who have met earlier in the championship to meet again. Therefore, there was no chance of a repeat of a previous encounter. Round 3 consisted of sixteen teams: the eight losers from Round 2 plus the eight winners from the backdoor system. So it was eight games and the eight winners progressed to Round 4.

St Vincents, Erins Isle, Na Fianna, O'Tooles, St Marys, Ballinteer St Johns, Lucan Sarsfields and Kilmacud Crokes progressed to the fourth round having won their respective games.

Parnells, Garda, Naomh Mearnóg, St Sylvesters, St Marks, St Annes, Thomas Davis, and Naomh Olaf were knocked out of the competition for 2006, although they retained their senior status for the 2007 Dublin Senior Club Football Championship.

Game	Date	Venue	Team A	Score	Team B	Score	Report
Dublin SFC; Third Round	20 July	Parnell Park	St Vincents	4-14	Parnells	0-3	
Dublin SFC; Third Round	18 July	Parnell Park	Erins Isle	1-10	Garda	1-09	
Dublin SFC; Third Round	20 July	Parnell Park	Naomh Mearnóg	1-9	Na Fianna	4-19	
Dublin SFC; Third Round	18 July	Parnell Park	St Sylvesters	1-07	O'Tooles	1-11	
Dublin SFC; Third Round	21 July	O'Toole Park	St Marks	1-15	St Marys	1-15	
Dublin SFC; Third Round	25 July	O'Toole Park	St Marks	2-09	St Marys	2-12	
Dublin SFC; Third Round	21 July	O'Toole Park	Ballinteer St. Johns	0-16	St Annes	1-5	
Dublin SFC; Third Round	22 July	Parnell Park	Lucan Sarsfields	3-8	Thomas Davis	3-7	
Dublin SFC; Third Round	22 July	Parnell Park	Kilmacud Crokes	5-13	Naomh Olaf	1-11	

=== Round 4 ===
The draw for the fourth round or the last 16 took place on 15 August. The draw was from the second-round winners - St Brigid's, UCD, Ballyboden St Enda's, St Judes, Raheny, St Oliver Plunkett's/Eoghan Ruadh, Round Towers Clondalkin and Ballymun Kickhams and the third-round winners - Kilmacud Crokes, Ballinteer St John's, St Vincent's, Na Fianna, O'Toole's, Erin's Isle, Lucan Sarsfields and St Mary's. The winners of the second round were drawn against the third-round winners; they were separated by two distinct lots meaning the second-round winners were kept apart from third-round winners in the fourth-round draw. The draw revealed a potential tie of the round between champions Kilmacud Crokes and Ballyboden St Endas.

Round four saw the exit of Erin's Isle, Ballinteer St John's, Ballyboden St Endas, Ballymun Kickhams, Raheny, O'Tooles, St Marys and St Brigids.

St Vincent's, Round Towers(Clondalkin), St Oliver Plunketts/Eoghan Ruadh, Na Fianna, Lucan Sarsfields, St Judes, UCD and tournament favourites Kilmacud Crokes progressed to the last eight.

Game	Date	Venue	Team A	Score	Team B	Score	Report
Dublin SFC; Fourth round	20 September	Parnell Park	St Vincents	1-08	St Brigids	0-9	
Dublin SFC; Fourth round	20 September	Parnell Park	Round Towers(Clondalkin)	3-17	Erins Isle	0-3	
Dublin SFC; Fourth round	21 September	Parnell Park	St Oliver Plunketts	3-11	Ballinteer St. Johns	1-06	
Dublin SFC; Fourth round	21 September	Parnell Park	Ballymun Kickhams	2-06	Na Fianna	1-09	
Dublin SFC; Fourth round Replay	27 September	Parnell Park	Ballymun Kickhams	1-08	Na Fianna	3-05	
Dublin SFC; Fourth round	22 September	Parnell Park	Raheny	1-09	Lucan Sarsfields	1-14	
Dublin SFC; Fourth round	22 September	Parnell Park	St Judes	2-10	O'Tooles	1-10	
Dublin SFC; Fourth round	23 September	Parnell Park	Ballyboden St Endas	2-06	Kilmacud Crokes	0-13	
Dublin SFC; Fourth round	23 September	Parnell Park	UCD	2-15	St Marys	0-12	

== Quarterfinals ==
The quarter finals saw the exit of Lucan Sarsfields, St Judes, St Oliver Plunketts and Round Towers of Clondalkin. St Vincents, UCD, Na Fianna and the tournament favourites Kilmacud Crokes went on to the semi-finals. The quarter finals saw the first round in the competition so far to have had no drawn matches.

Game	Date	Venue	Team A	Score	Team B	Score	Report
Dublin SFC; Quarter-final	6 October	Parnell Park	St Vincents	3-05	St Judes	2-06	
Dublin SFC; Quarter-final	6 October	Parnell Park	UCD	1-10	Round Towers - Clondalkin	0-08	
Dublin SFC; Quarter-final	7 October	Parnell Park	Na Fianna	1-15	St Oliver Plunkett's	3-08	
Dublin SFC; Quarter-final	7 October	Parnell Park	Kilmacud Crokes	0-11	Lucan Sarsfields	0-08	

== Semi-final ==
The Dublin senior club football championship did not go ahead on the original 12 October date, due to an appeal by St Oliver Plunketts/Eoghan Ruadh and Kilmacud Crokes.

A decision on the dates was to be decided pending the results of Plunkett's appeal which was to be heard by the Dublin GAC on 13 October.

The Leinster council had given an extra week for the Dublin GAC to sort the issues. If the problems were not sorted in time, Dublin would not have a representative in the Leinster Senior Club Football Championship for the 2006/07 season.

=== Na Fianna V St Oliver Plunketts/Eoghan Ruadh dispute ===
St Oliver Plunkett's/Eoghan Ruadh had lodged a complaint objecting to the eligibility of Na Fianna's former Mayo player Gary Mullins, who took part in the quarter-final clash between the two teams.

St Oliver Plunkett's lost their appeal to the Dublin County Board, therefore the Dublin GAC set the fixture of Na Fianna against St Vincents as originally planned.

St Oliver Plunkett's, however, took their appeal to the Leinster Council in hope of being re-instated into the Dublin Championship. This further delayed the Dublin Championship and raised the possibility of the championship not being completed in time for Dublin to produce a representative in the Leinster championship. The Leinster council ruled in favour of the Dublin GAC and the semi-final was slated to proceed on 19 October.

As St Oliver Plunketts lost their appeal to the Leinster Council, Na Fianna played St Vincent's in the semi-final clash as planned. The game was initially scheduled for Friday 27 October 2006 but was cancelled and rescheduled for Monday 30 October to enable Ireland International Rules captain Kieran McGeeney to be available for the first test against Australia at Pearse Stadium.

==== Gary Mullins' appeal to the Disputes Resolution Authority ====
Gary Mullins also appealed to the Disputes Resolution Authority on 13 October 2006 to overturn a 12-week ban he received due to receiving a red card while playing for the Chicago Wolfe Tone's club at the North American Senior Football final in Philadelphia. He lost this appeal.

=== Kilmacud Crokes V Dublin County board dispute ===
The Dublin Championship was met with more scandal when Kilmacud Crokes postponed their game against UCD, stating that it was not within five days of their game against Lucan Sarsfields in the quarter-final. This had the effect that Kilmacud had breached Rule 116 of the official guide. The GAC met Kilmacud representatives on 17 October to discuss the matter. The meeting of the GAC resulted in Kimacud Crokes being excluded from the Senior Club Football Championship.

UCD offered Kilmacud a replay thus reinstating Crokes, which would guarantee a Dublin representative in the Leinster Senior Club Football Championship. The semi final between the students and the Crokes was slated to take place on Thursday 26 October 2006. Kilmacud Crokes went on to play the game against the Students and were narrowly defeated, giving the Dublin Senior Football Championship its first finalist.

The winners of each semi final went on to the Dublin senior club football championship final. The losing teams were eliminated from the competition and there was no third and fourth-place games, therefore a loss would prove to be the respective teams final fixture in the Dublin championship.

Dublin Senior Club Football favourites Kilmacud Crokes crashed out of the Dublin championship to UCD in a tight game. UCD went on their first final since 2002. The 2006 final was a repeat of the 2002 final, as Na Fianna crashed out of the Dublin championship to northside rivals St Vincents. UCD won the 2002 final against St Vincents who were seeking to retain their first title since 1984.

Game	Date	Venue	Team A	Score	Team B	Score	Report
Dublin SFC; Semi-final	30 October	Parnell Park	St Vincents	1-12	Na Fianna	0-05	
Dublin SFC; Semi-final	26 October	Parnell Park	UCD	1-08	Kilmacud Crokes	0-10	

== Last 8 ==
Quarterfinals; 6 October/7 October
St Judes	2-06
St Vincents	3-05
St Oliver Plunkett's	3-08
Na Fianna	1-15
UCD	1-10
Round Towers (C)	0-08
Kilmacud Crokes	0-11
Lucan Sarsfields	0-08

Semifinals; 26 October/30 October
St Vincents	1-12
Na Fianna	0-05
UCD	1-08
Kilmacud Crokes	0-10

Final; 6 November
UCD	0-10
St Vincents	0-09

== Dublin Senior Club Football Final ==
The teams for the final were selected from the following players:
UCD: S Gallagher, D Geraghty, P Navin, J McCarthy, M Duffy, E Cuiv, M Dunne, S Brady, J Sherry, B Sheehan, S Lennon, C Rogers, Colm Judge, A O'Malley, C O'Dwyer, J Kindergen, P McConway, C Fagan, M Ward, J Hanley, P Earls, N McNamee, K Doherty, B Quill, J Donoghue, W Minchin, B Mullin, P McNulty, F Canavan, E McHugh, J Tierney, B O hAnnaidh, N O'Connaughton, B Teehan, B Collins.

St Vincents: M Savage, W Lowry, E Brady, A Costello, P Conlon, G Brennan, R Fallon, P Gilroy, M Loftus, K Golden, N Dunne, T Doyle, D Connolly, T Diamond, T Quinn, E Somerville, J Calvert, C Hayes, J Moloney, B Manning, C Hayden, G Dent, S Loughlin, H Coughlan, A Stack, C Brady, R Brady, R Drumgoole.

UCD	0-10 - 0-09 (final score after 70 minutes)	St Vincents
Manager: Malachy O'Rourke Team: S Gallagher; J McCarthy; P Navin; E O Cúiv; M Duffy; B Quill; M Dunne; M Ward; J Sherry; S Brady; S Lennon; B Sheehan; P Earls; C Rogers; C O'Dwyer Substitutes: N McNamee; A O'Malley; Earls	Half-time: 0-02 - 0-04 Competition: Dublin Senior Football Championship (Final) Date: 20.00 BST; Monday, 6 November 2006 Venue: Parnell Park, Dublin Attendance: 6,000 Referee: Match rules: 70 minutes. Replay if scores still level. Maximum of 5 substitutions.	Manager:Mickey Whelan Team: M Savage; W Lowry; E Brady; A Costello; P Conlon; G Brennan; R Fallon; P Gilroy; M Loftus; H Coughlan; T Diamond; D Connolly; K Golden; T Doyle; T Quinn Substitutes: S Loughlin; B Manning; N Dunne

UCD were crowned winners of the Dublin senior football championship and then went on to play in the Leinster Senior Club Football Championship against the Meath champions Wolfe Tones.

== See also ==
- 2006 Dublin Senior Hurling Championship
