= Dub Stars Football and Hurling Challenge =

The Dubs Star Football and Hurling Challenge is an annual exhibition match played on New Year's Day between Dublin and a select Dub Stars team in both codes of Gaelic football and hurling.

== 2017 ==
=== Football ===
1 January 2017	Dublin	3-13 - 4-9	Dubs Stars	Parnell Park; Referee: Darragh Sheppard (Round Towers Lusk)
1 January 2017	Conor McHugh 2-4, Paul Hudson 0-4 (0-2f), Killian O'Gara 1-1, Niall Walsh 0-3, Ciaran Reddin 0-1	Report	Tomas Quinn 3-5 (0-3f), Darren Gavin 1-0, Niall Coakley 0-3 (0-2f), Gerry Seaver 0-1	Parnell Park; Referee: Darragh Sheppard (Round Towers Lusk)

Dublin:
1	Evan Comerford (Ballymun Kickhams)
15	Eoin O'Brien (Castleknock)
3	Shane Clayton (Ballyboden)
21	Ross McGowan (Kilmacud Crokes)
22	Niall Scully (Templeogue Synge Street)
11	Robbie McDaid (St. Vincents)
13	Conor Mullally (Cuala)
6	Ryan Deegan (Thomas Davis)
18	Ciaran Reddin (St. Maur's)
19	Gary Sweeney (St. Sylvesters)
2	Colm Basquel (Ballyboden)
20	Niall Walsh (St Oliver Plunketts/Eoghan Ruadh)
9	Paul Hudson (Thomas Davis)
17	Killian O'Gara (Templeogue Synge Street)
12	Conor McHugh (Na Fianna)
Subs:
4	Shane Cunningham (Kilmacud Crokes) for Basquel (32)
8	Ross Hazely (St. Sylvesters) for McDaid (32)
5	Mick Deegan (Donaghmore/Ashbourne) for O'Gara (35)
7	Robbie Gaughan (Ballinteer St John's) for Ryan Deegan (40)
10	Gavin Ivory (Raheny) for Scully (40)
14	Sean Newcombe (Lucan Sarsfields) for Hudson (44)
16	John Brian Carthy (St. Jude's) for Comerford (45)

Dubs Stars:
1	Morven Connolly (Castleknock)
2	Craig Wilson (St. Vincents)
3	Graham Hannigan (Castleknock)
4	Tom Shiels (Castleknock)
5	Ross O'Brien (St. Jude's)
6	Maitias MacDonncha (Clontarf)
7	Brian Howard (Raheny)
8	Darren Gavin (Lucan Sarsfields)
9	Shane Boland (Castleknock)
10	Tom Lahiff (St. Jude's)
11	Gerry Seaver (Ballyboughal)
12	Paddy Small (Ballymun Kickhams)
13	Stephen Smith (Skerries Harps)
14	Niall Coakley (St. Jude's)
15	Tomas Quinn (St. Vincents)
Subs:
20	Gavin Carruth (Thomas Davis) for Gavin (21)
16	Sean Blanchfield (Thomas Davis) for M Connolly (40)
19	Eanna O'Toole (Thomas Davis) for Smith (42)
	Gavin for Boland (43)
17	Daire Kerr (Thomas Davis) for Seaver (44)
	Boland for Coakley (55)
	Seaver for Carruth (55)

=== Hurling ===
1 January 2017	Dublin	1-19 - 1-14	Dubs Stars	Parnell Park; Referee: Sean Stack (Parnells)
1 January 2017	Sean Ó Riain 1-3 (0-1f), Tomas Connolly 0-4, Conor Burke and Fergal Whitely 0-3 each, Caolan Conway and Andrew Jamieson-Murphy 0-2 each, Fiontan McGibb and Donal Burke (1 '65) 0-1 each	Report	Alex Quinn 1-4, Oisin O'Rorke 0-4 (0-2f), Donie Fox and Joe McManus 0-2 each, Robbie Mahon and Cillian Costello 0-1 each	Parnell Park; Referee: Sean Stack (Parnells)

Dublin:
1	Jonathan Treacy (Na Fianna)
2	Mark Kavanagh (St. Brigid's)
3	Patrick Smyth (Clontarf)
4	Mark McCallion (Kilmacud Crokes)
5	Fionn Ó Riain Broin (St. Jude's)
6	Matthew McCaffrey (Lucan Sarsfields)
7	Cian MacGabhann (Kilmacud Crokes)
8	Caolan Conway (Kilmacud Crokes)
9	Andrew Jamieson-Murphy (Na Fianna)
10	Conor Burke (St. Sylvesters)
11	Sean Ó Riain (Setanta)
12	James Holland (Ballyboden)
13	Canice Maher (Thomas Davis)
14	Tomas Connolly (St. Vincents)
15	Alan Moore (St. Vincents)
Subs:
19	Fergal Whitely (Kilmacud Crokes) for Conway (HT)
21	Fionntan McGibb (Setanta) for C Burke (40)
22	Donal Burke (Na Fianna) for Holland (48)
23	Ben Qunn (Crumlin) for Jamieson-Murphy (51)
18	Ciaran Dowling (Lucan Sarsfields) for MacGabhann (52)
20	Johnny McGuirk (St. Brigid's) for T Connolly (56)

Dubs Stars:
1	Brendan McLoughlin (O'Tooles)
2	Niall Corcoran (Kilmacud Crokes)
3	Ronan Walsh (Kilmacud Crokes)
4	John Bellew (Lucan Sarsfields)
5	Conor Murphy (Crumlin)
6	Chris Crummey (Lucan Sarsfields)
7	Robbie Mahon (Craobh Chiaráin)
8	Cillian Costello (Naomh Barróg)
9	Donie Fox (St. Jude's)
10	Ross O'Carroll (Kilmacud Crokes)
11	Joe McManus (St. Jude's)
12	Fergal Heavey (Faughs)
13	Kevin O'Reilly (Lucan Sarsfields)
14	Oisin O'Rorke (Kilmacud Crokes)
15	Alex Quinn (Crumlin)
Subs:
17	Eoin Sheehy (Kilmacud Crokes) for Walsh (HT)
18	Ronan Hayes (Kilmacud Crokes) for Costello (HT)
19	Gavin King (Na Fianna) for Heavey (HT)
16	Eoin Skelly (Na Fianna) for McLoughlin (HT)
20	Stephen O'Dwyer (Kilmacud Crokes) for O'Reilly (46)
21	Paul Crummey (Lucan Sarsfields) for McManus (49)
