= 1948 Dublin Senior Hurling Championship =

Annual hurling competition season

- Champions: University College Dublin (3rd title)
- Runners-up: Faughs

The 1948 Dublin Senior Hurling Championship was the 61st staging of the Dublin Senior Hurling Championship since its establishment by the Dublin County Board in 1887.

University College Dublin entered the championship as the defending champions.

The final was played on 30 May 1948 at Croke Park in Dublin, between University College Dublin and Faughs, in what was their second consecutive meeting in the final. UCD won the match by 3–08 to 2–07 to claim their third championship title overall and a second consecutive title.

== Results ==
=== Final ===
| 30 May 1948 Final | University College Dublin | 3-08 - 2-07 | Faughs | Croke Park |
