= Rónán Fallon =

Irish hurler and Gaelic footballer

Personal information
- Native name: Rónán Ó Fallúin (Irish)
- Born: 1984 (age 41–42) Dublin, Ireland

Sport
- Sport: Hurling
- Position: Centre-back
Club
- Years: Club
- 2000s–2010s: St Vincents
Club titles
	Football	Hurling
Dublin titles	1	0
Leinster titles	1	0
All-Ireland titles	1	0
Inter-county*
Years	County	Apps (scores)
2003–2010	Dublin	61 (0–22)
Inter-county titles
- NHL: 1 (Div. 2)
- *Inter County team apps and scores correct as of 20 February 2015. Includes National League and Championship.

Rónán Fallon (born 1984) is an Irish former hurler who played as a centre-back for the Dublin senior team.

Born in Dublin, Fallon played both hurling and Gaelic football with his local club, St Vincents. He won an All-Ireland Senior Club Football Championship with Vincents as a used sub in 2008. At senior inter-county level, Fallon played exclusively with the Dublin hurlers from 2003 to 2010. During this time, he established himself as one of the best centre-backs in the country which culminated in him winning a Vodafone GAA All Stars of the Month award in March 2007 and being nominated for an All Stars Award in 2008.

== Hurling career ==
=== Club ===
Fallon plays hurling with the famous St Vincents club in Marino, Dublin. While he has never won a Dublin Senior Hurling Championship title with them, he has been a runner-up on three occasions. He played in his first county final in 2005 against UCD, losing by a scoreline 3–13 to 2–10. Fallon reached county final with Vincents again in 2007 when they lost to Ballyboden St Endas by 2–13 to 1–5. He suffered another heavy defeat to Ballyboden in the 2010 final, this time losing by a scoreline of 3–17 to 1–10.

=== Inter-county ===
Fallon made his debut for the Dublin senior hurlers in a National League game against Kilkenny in 2003. Earlier that year, he was a substitute on the Dublin team that beat Kilkenny in the Walsh Cup final at Parnell Park by 2–11 to 2–10. This was an unusual start to any Dublin hurlers career as it was Dublin's' first piece of hurling silverware since 1966. In 2005, Dublin were relegated to Division 2 of the National Hurling League after finishing at the bottom of the table in Division 1. The following year, Dublin gained promotion back to Division 1 when they won their first ever Division 2 title, beating Kerry in the final by 0–16 to 0–6. While Fallon was not to win any more silverware with the Dubs thereafter, he made a name for himself at inter-county level as an impressive centre-back, receiving many individual accolades. He was named at centre-back on the 2006 and 2007 Dublin Blue Stars teams and won a Vodafone GAA All Stars of the Month award in March 2007, having led Dublin at centre-back to victories over Galway and Limerick in the League, thus securing their Division 1 status for the following year. That same year at the inaugural awards ceremony hosted by Friends of Dublin Hurling, Fallon was chosen as Dublin Senior Player of the Year. In 2008, he was nominated for an All Stars Award. Fallon missed Dublin's championship campaign in 2009 after he sustained a broken metatarsal against Kilkenny in the National Hurling League. After returning from injury, Fallon failed to break into Anthony Daly's championship line-up and retired in 2010.

=== Inter-provincial ===
In 2008, Fallon was selected at centre-back for the Leinster provincial team. In their first game, they beat Connacht in the semi-final of the Railway Cup. In the final in Portlaoise, Leinster faced a Munster team that was bidding for a three-in-a-row. Leinster beat them by 1–15 to 1–12, winning Fallon his first and only Railway Cup medal.

== Football career ==
=== Club ===
Fallon played football at senior level with St Vincents for many years. In 2006, one year after he lost to UCD in his first hurling county final, he faced the students again, this time in his first football county final. Once more, UCD were victorious, beating Vincents by 0–10 to 0–9. In 2007, Fallon won his first Dublin Senior Football Championship title with Vincents as an unused sub when they beat St Brigids by 0–12 to 1–7. They then went on to win a Leinster Senior Club Football Championship in December of that year, beating Tyrrellspass of Westmeath by 2–8 to 0–7, although Fallon did not take part in this game either. This qualified Vincents for the All-Ireland Senior Club Football Championship, which they had not won since 1985. On Saint Patrick's Day, 17 March 2008, they played Nemo Rangers of Cork in the final in Croke Park, whom they had previously lost to in the final in 1973. However, Vincents were to be victorious on this occasion, beating Nemo by 1–11 to 0–13. Fallon came on as a substitute for Hugh Gill after 58 minutes, winning him his first and only All-Ireland medal.

=== Inter-county ===
Fallon never competed at senior level for the Dublin footballers, but was a dual player for Dublin up to under-21 level. He was on the starting panel that won the Leinster Under-21 Football Championship when they beat Kildare by 0–13 to 0–11 in 2005.

== Honours ==
=== Hurling ===
==== St Vincents ====
- Dublin Senior Hurling Championship

Runner-up (3): 2005, 2007, 2010

==== Dublin ====
- National Hurling League Division 2

Winner (1): 2006

- Walsh Cup

Winner (1): 2003
Runner-up (1): 2010

==== Leinster ====
- Railway Cup

Winner (1): 2008

==== Individual ====
- GAA All Stars

Nominated (1): 2008

- Vodafone GAA All Stars of the Month

Winner (1): March 2007

- Dublin Blue Stars

Winner (2): 2006, 2007

- Dublin Senior Player of the Year

Winner (1): 2007

=== Football ===
==== St Vincents ====
- All-Ireland Senior Club Football Championship

Winner (1): 2008 (sub)

- Leinster Senior Club Football Championship

Winner (1): 2007 (sub)

- Dublin Senior Football Championship

Winner (1): 2007 (sub)
Runner-up (1): 2006

==== Dublin ====
- Leinster Under-21 Football Championship

Winner (1): 2005
