= 2007 Dublin Senior Hurling Championship =

Annual hurling competition season

Tournament details
- County: Dublin
- Year: 2007

Winners
- Champions: Ballyboden St Endas (1st win)
- Manager: Liam Hogan

The 2007 Dublin Senior Hurling Championship is a Dublin-based GAA club competition between the top clubs in Dublin Hurling. 'UCD GAA have elected not to participate in the Dublin SHC for 2007.' The first round of the 2007 championship was due to begin on August 28, 2007. However, these dates were put forward to mid September to accommodate for the Dublin players contesting the All-Ireland Under-21 Hurling Championship.

== Quarter and Semi-finals ==
Game	Date	Venue	Winner	Score	Loser	Score
Dublin SHC; Quarter-final	October 14	O'Toole Park	Cuala; S Murphy 1–2, E Dunne 1-1 (1-1 f), S Kiely 0-2 (0-2f), F O'Brien (0-1f), D Holden 0-1 each.	2-07	O'Tooles; K Flynn 0-10 (0-5f, 0-2 '65'), G O'Meara 0–2, G Morris, L Ryan, D Webster, P Carton 0-1 each.	0-16
Dublin SHC; Quarter-final	October 14	O'Toole Park	Ballyboden St Endas; D Sweeney 1–3, J Doody 1-1, M Travers (0-4f), M Griffin (0-2f) 0-4 each, C Keaney 1–0, S Durkin 0–1.	3-13	Dublin North 2 P Carroll 0-8 (0-8f), S Mullen, P O Laoire, J Boland 0-1 each.	0-11
Dublin SHC; Quarter-final	October 14	Parnell Park	Lucan Sarsfields; F Clandillon 1-4 (0-3f), G Coleman 0–3, J McCaffrey, T Sommers (0-2f) 0-2 each, T Clandillon, P O'Driscoll 0-1 each.	1-13	St Brigids; P McAvenue 0-6 (0-5f, 0-1 '65'), A McEnerney 0–2, C O'Mahony, C Ryan (0-1 sline) A Nolan (0-1f) 0-1 each.	0-11
Dublin SHC; Quarter-final	October 14	Parnell Park	St Vincents; T McGrane 0-8 (7f), G Boyle 2-2, N Bishop, S McHugh 0-1 each.	2-12	Craobh Chiaráin; D O'Reilly 0-5 (0-4f, 0-1 '65'), A McCrabbe 0-3 (0-2f, 0-1 '65'), J McGuirk, S McDonnell (0-2f), K English 0-2 each, P O'Boyle (0-1 f), S Bennett 0-1 each.	0-16
Dublin SHC; Semi-final	October 14	Parnell Park	St Vincents; T McGrane 0-8 (0-6f, 0-1 ‘65’), S O’Neill 1–0, R Fallon 0-2 (0-2f), S Loughlin, D Russell, G Boyle 0-1 each.	1-13	O'Tooles; K Flynn 0-5 (0-5f), L Ryan 0–3, P Carton 1–0, K Horgan 0–1.	1-09
Dublin SHC; Semi-final	October 14	Parnell Park	Ballyboden St Endas; D Sweeney 2–0, M Griffin 0-4 (0-3f), M Travers 0-3 (0-3f), E Kinsella 1–0, C Keaney (0-1f), E Carroll 0-2 each, S Hiney 0–1; Lucan own goal.	4-12	Lucan Sarsfields; T Sommers 0-4 (0-2f, 0-1 ‘65’), P O’Driscoll 0–3, F Clandillon, J McCaffrey (0-1 ‘65’) 0-2 each, A O’Neill, D Quinn 0-1 each.	0-13

== Group A ==
The opening game of the tournament was the Group A clash between South Dublin and Faughs. Faughs won the game by 1–10 to 1–07 at Blunden Drive on September 13. In the second game of the opening round Lucan Sarsfields had a convincing win over Craobh which put them on top of the table after the first round. The second round saw Craobh return to lastyears form with a convincing 1–15 to 0–09 victory over Faughs.

Table	P	W	D	L	F	A	+/-	Pts
Lucan Sarsfields	3	3	0	0	3-42	3-29	+22	6
Craobh Chiaráin	3	2	0	1	4-38	2-28	+15	4
Faughs	3	2	0	1	3-28	3-38	-16	2
South Dublin 1	3	0	0	3	1-22	3-38	-22	0

Game	Date	Venue	Team	Score	Team	Score
SHC A1	September 13	Blunden Drive	South Dublin 1	1-07	Faughs	1-10
SHC A1	September 14	Parnell Park	Craobh Chiaráin	1-08	Lucan Sarsfields	2-13
SHC A2	September 29	Parnell Park	Craobh Chiaráin	1-15	Faughs	0-09
SHC A2	September 29	O'Toole Park	Lucan Sarsfields	0-13	Dublin South 1	0-09
SHC A3	October 6		Craobh Chiaráin	2-15	Dublin South 1	0-06
SHC A3	October 9		Lucan Sarsfields	1-16	Faughs	2-09

== Group B ==
Table	P	W	D	L	F	A	+/-	Pts
St Vincents	3	3	0	0	5-54	4-22	+35	6
St Brigids	3	0	1	2	9-30	3-33	+15	3
Crumlin	3	2	0	1	2-35	8-43	-26	2
North Dublin 1	3	0	1	2	0-29	1-50	-24	1

Game	Date	Venue	Team	Score	Team	Score
SHC A1	September 15	Parnell Park	Crumlin	1-09	St Vincents	2-21
SHC A1	September 15	Parnell Park	St Brigids	0-12	Dublin North 1	0-12
SHC A2	September 24	Parnell Park	Crumlin	0-18	Dublin North 1	0-09
SHC A2	September 29	Parnell Park	St Vincents	2-13	St Brigids	3-05
SHC A3	October 7		St Vincents	1-20	Dublin North 1	0-08
SHC A3	October 8		St Brigids	6-13	Crumlin	1-08

== Group C ==
The first game of Group C between O'Tooles and Naomh Mearnóg was abandoned due to a problem with the floodlights.

Table	P	W	D	L	F	A	+/-	Pts
O'Tooles	3	3	0	0	6-49	2-26	+37	6
North Dublin 2	3	2	0	1	4-47	4-38	+11	4
Naomh Mearnóg	3	1	0	2	4-35	6-46	-17	2
St Marks	3	0	0	3	3-32	5-53	-31	0

Game	Date	Venue	Team	Score	Team	Score
SHC A1	September 15	O'Toole Park	St Marks	2-09	North Dublin 2	1-20
SHC A1	September 15	Páirc N. Uinsionn	O'Tooles	3-13	Naomh Mearnóg	1-09
SHC A2	September 26	Parnell Park	O'Tooles	2-18	St Marks	0-07
SHC A2	September 25	Blunden Drive	Dublin North 2	2-17	Naomh Mearnóg	1-11
SHC A3	October 10		O'Tooles	1-18	North Dublin 2	1-10
SHC A3	October 10		Naomh Mearnóg	2-15	St Marks	1-16

== Group D ==
Kilmacud opened the 2007 Group D first round with a one-sided victory over Dublin South 2.

Table	P	W	D	L	F	A	+/-	Pts
Ballyboden St Endas	3	3	0	0	4-51	1-35	+28	6
Cuala	3	2	0	1	5-46	4-42	+08	4
Kilmacud Crokes	3	1	0	2	3-45	3-39	+09	2
Dublin South 2	3	0	0	3	3-31	8-61	-45	0

Game	Date	Venue	Team	Score	Team	Score
SHC A1	September 14	Blunden Drive	Kilmacud Crokes	3-19	South Dublin 2	1-08
SHC A1	September 15	O'Toole Park	Cuala	1-12	Ballyboden St Endas	2-16
SHC A2	September 29	O'Toole Park	South Dublin 2	0-11	Ballyboden St Endas	1-22
SHC A2	October 6		Cuala	1-14	Kilmacud Crokes	0-14

== See also ==
- Dublin Senior Hurling Championship 2006
- Dublin Senior Hurling Championship 2009
