= Bob Mockler =

Irish hurler

Personal information
- Native name: Roibéard Móicléir (Irish)
- Born: 18 April 1886 Horse and Jockey, County Tipperary, Ireland
- Died: 9 May 1966 (aged 80) Baggot Street, Dublin, Ireland
- Occupation: Labourer

Sport
- Sport: Hurling
- Position: Midfield
Club
- Years: Club
- 1915-1924: Faughs
Club titles
- Dublin titles: 6
Inter-county
- Years: County
- 1908-1913 1915-1924: Tipperary; Dublin
Inter-county titles
- Munster titles: 1
- Leinster titles: 5
- All-Irelands: 3

Robert Mockler (18 April 1886 – 9 May 1966) was an Irish hurler who played as a midfielder for the Tipperary and Dublin senior teams from 1909 until 1924.

Mockler made his first appearance for the Tipperary team during the 1908 championship and was a regular member of the starting seventeen for the next few seasons. He subsequently enjoyed a decade long career with Dublin before retiring from the game after the 1924 championship. During that time he won three All-Ireland medals, five Leinster medals and one Munster medal. Mockler captained Dublin to the All-Ireland title in 1920.

Mockler began his club career with Horse and Jockey before later winning six county championship medals with Faughs in Dublin.

== Playing career ==
=== Club ===
Mockler began his club hurling career with Horse and Jockey. By 1915 Mockler had joined the Faughs team in Dublin. He had a successful beginning with the team winning back-to-back championship medals in 1914 and 1915.

Three-in-a-row proved beyond Faughs, however, the team reached the championship decider once again in 1920. Mockler collected a third championship medal that year as Faughs emerged as county champions once again. It was the first of four-in-row with Mockler, the veteran of the team, playing a key role in all of those victories.

=== Inter-county ===
Mockler first came to prominence on the inter-county scene as a member of the Tipperary senior hurling team in 1908. He made his first appearance in that year's All-Ireland decider as Tipp faced Dublin. A 2–5 to 1–8 draw was the result on that occasion. Tipperary won the replay, however, Mockler played no part in the replay.

By 1909 Mockler was a regular member of the Tipperary team and he lined out in his first provincial final. A 2–10 to 2–6 defeat of Cork gave him his first Munster medal. Tipperary subsequently faced Kilkenny in the All-Ireland decider. Before the game itself there was internal fighting within the Kilkenny camp and a selection row left the team short of substitutes. In spite of this the team still went on to win the game, courtesy of three goals by Bill Hennerby and a fourth by Jimmy Kelly. A 4–6 to 0–12 defeat was the result on that occasion.

It was 1913 before Tipperary emerged as Munster champions once again. Mockler played no part in the provincial decider, however, he was brought onto the team for the subsequent All-Ireland decider against Kilkenny. A 2–4 to 1–2 score line resulted in defeat for Tipp and an historic first three-in-a-row for Kilkenny.

By 1915 Mockler had moved to Dublin and declared for the Dublin senior hurling team. After losing the provincial decider to Laois that year, Mockler lined out in the eastern showpiece once again in 1917. A 5–1 to 4–0 defeat of reigning provincial champions Kilkenny gave Mockler his first Leinster medal. The subsequent All-Ireland final pitted Mockler against his native Tipperary. He scored 1-2 from midfield as Dublin won the game by 5–4 to 4–2. It was Mockler's first All-Ireland medal.

Dublin surrendered their titles the following year, however, a 1–5 to 1–2 defeat of Kilkenny gave Mockler a second Leinster medal in 1919. The All-Ireland final saw Dublin line out against Cork. "The Rebels" were coasting at half-time with Jimmy Kennedy having scored four goals. He had two more disallowed to give his side a 4–2 to 1–1 lead. Cork also dominated the second half to secure a 6–4 to 2–4 victory.

In 1920 Mockler was appointed captain of the Dublin senior hurling team. He won a third Leinster medal that year as Dublin defeated Kilkenny by 4–5 to 2-2. The All-Ireland decider was a repeat of the previous year with Cork providing the opposition once again. A goal blitz by Joe Phelan, Jimmy Walsh and Mick Neville gave Dublin a 4–9 to 4–3 victory. It was Mockler's second All-Ireland medal while he also had the honour of collecting the cup.

Mockler was captain again in 1921. He collected a fourth Leinster medal that year as Kilkenny were defeated by 4–4 to 1–5. The subsequent All-Ireland medal saw Dublin face Limerick. The Munster champions went on a goal-scoring rampage with captain Bob McConkey capturing four goals in all. Dublin went on to lose the game by 8–5 to 3–2.

After back-to-back defeat provincial final defeats, Dublin bounced back in 1924. A 4–4 to 3–1 defeat of Offaly gave Mockler a fifth and final Leinster medal. He later lined out in his last All-Ireland final, with reigning champions Galway providing the opposition. Galway played with the wind in the first half and led by three points at the break. Two goals by Dublin forward Garrett Howard and a great goalkeeping display by Tommy Daly ensured a 5–3 to 2–6 victory for Dublin. It was Mockler's third All-Ireland medal.

Sporting positions
Preceded by Charlie Stuart	Dublin Senior Hurling Captain; 1920-1922	Succeeded by Tommy Moore
Achievements
Preceded by Jimmy ‘Major’ Kennedy (Cork)	All-Ireland Senior Hurling Final winning captain 1920	Succeeded by Bob McConkey (Limerick)
