= 1973 Dublin Senior Hurling Championship =

Annual hurling competition season

- Champions: Faughs (27th title)
- Runners-up: O'Tooles

The 1973 Dublin Senior Hurling Championship was the 86th staging of the Dublin Senior Hurling Championship since its establishment by the Dublin County Board in 1887.

Faughs entered the championship as the defending champions.

The final, a replay, was played on 30 September 1973 at Parnell Park in Dublin, between Faughs and O'Tooles, in what was their second consecutive meeting in the final. Faughs won the match by 2–07 to 1–06 to claim their 27th championship title overall and a second consecutive title.

== Results ==
=== Final ===
9 September 1973 Final	Faughs	2-08 - 1-11	O'Tooles	Parnell Park

=== Final replay ===
30 September 1973 Final	Faughs	2-07 - 1-06	O'Tooles	Parnell Park
