= Alan Nolan =

Alan Nolan may refer to:

- Alan Nolan (hurler), Irish hurler
- Alan T. Nolan, American military historian
