= Martin Hayes =

Martin Hayes may refer to:

- Martin Hayes (bishop) (born 1959), Irish Roman Catholic prelate and current Bishop of Kilmore
- Martin Hayes (footballer) (born 1966), English footballer and manager
- Martin Hayes (hurler) (1890–1967), Irish hurler
- Martin Hayes (musician) (born 1962), Irish fiddler
