= 2006 Dublin Senior Hurling Championship =

Annual hurling competition season

Dublin Senior Hurling Championship 2006
Tournament details
- County: Dublin
- Year: 2006

Winners
- Champions: Craobh Chiaráin (8th win)
- Manager: ?
- Captain: J McGuirk

Promotion/Relegation
- Promoted team(s): St Marks
- Relegated team(s): ?

Other
- Player of the Year: James Ryan

This is a round-up of the 2006 Dublin Senior Hurling Championship. The previous champions were UCD, who did not have a chance to retain their title this year as they were not entered in the competition. Craobh Chiaráin won the 2006 championship by Ballyboden St Endas to claim their 8th title. Craobh went on to the Leinster senior club hurling championship preliminary round against Mount Leinster Rangers of Carlow. They defeated Mount Leinster Rangers to go on to the semi-final of the Leinster championship against Birr of Offaly.

== Quarterfinals ==
Game	Date	Venue	Team A	Score	Team B	Score	Report
Dublin SHC; Quarter-final	September 9	Parnell Park	St Vincents	1-12	Cuala	0-10	
Dublin SHC; Quarter-final	September 9	Parnell Park	Craobh Chiaráin	2-13	Kilmacud Crokes	1-14	

== Semi-final and Final ==
Game	Date	Venue	Team A	Score	Team B	Score	Report
Dublin SHC; Semi-final	September	Parnell Park	Ballyboden St Endas	2-14	St Vincents	1-14	
Dublin SHC; Semi-final	September 16	Parnell Park	Craobh Chiaráin	0-16	O'Tooles	0-11	
Dublin SHC; Final	October 1	Parnell Park	Ballyboden St Endas	2-08	Craobh Chiaráin	2-10	

== Last 16 ==
Quarterfinals
Craobh Chiaráin	2-13
Kilmacud Crokes	1-14
St Vincents	1-12
Cuala	0-10

Semifinals
Craobh Chiaráin	0-16
O'Tooles	0-11
Ballyboden St Endas	2-14
St Vincents	1-14

Final
Craobh Chiaráin	2-10
Ballyboden St Endas	2-08

== Final ==
Craobh Chiaráins victory over Ballyboden St Endas meant that they progressed to the preliminary round of the Leinster championship against the Carlow hurling champions Mount Leinster Rangers. They lost heavily as was expected.

Craobh Chiaráin; Green and Yellow Shirts/White shorts/Green Socks	2-10 - 2-08 (final score after 60 minutes)	Ballyboden St Endas; Blue and White Stripes
Manager:Dave Kelly Team: S Chester (GK); G Kelly; K O'Donoghue; Damien O'Reilly; K Elliot; Derek; J Kingston; D Shanley; P O'Boyle; J McGuirk (Capt.); A McCrabbe; K English; G Ennis; S McDonnell. Substitutes: Seamy Keeley; G Duggan; D Wyse; E Farrell	Half-time: 1-6 - 0-5 Competition: Dublin Senior Hurling Championship (Final) Date: 15.30 BST; Saturday, October 1, 2006 Venue: Parnell Park, Dublin Attendance: Referee: M Butler (Kilmacud Crokes) Match rules: 60 minutes. Replay if scores still level. Maximum of 5 substitutions.	Manager: Liam Hogan Team: C McCormack; C Ryan; S Perkins; A Reilly; M Kenny; D Spain; C Keaney; S Hiney; D Sweeney; D Curtin; J Duffy; D Daly; E Carroll; G Maguire; S Durkin Substitutes: E Kinsella; P Ryan; M Griffin

== See also ==
- 2007 Dublin Senior Hurling Championship
- 2006 Dublin Senior Football Championship
