= 1972 Dublin Senior Hurling Championship =

Annual hurling competition season

- Champions: Faughs (26th title); Seán Buckley (captain)
- Runners-up: O'Tooles; Tom Dowd (captain)

The 1972 Dublin Senior Hurling Championship was the 85th staging of the Dublin Senior Hurling Championship since its establishment by the Dublin County Board in 1887.

Craobh Chiaráin entered the championship as the defending champions.

The final was played on 1 October 1972 at Parnell Park in Dublin, between Faughs and O'Tooles, in what was their second meeting in the final overall. Faughs won the match by 1–12 to 3–02 to claim their 26th championship title overall and a first title in two years.

== Results ==
=== Final ===
1 October 1972 Final	Faughs	1-12 - 3-02	O'Tooles	Parnell Park
