= Paddy Smyth =

Irish hurler

Personal information
- Native name: Pádraig Mac Gabhan (Irish)
- Born: 1998 (age 27–28) Clontarf, Dublin, Ireland
- Occupation: Student

Sport
- Sport: Hurling
- Position: Right corner-back
Club
- Years: Club
- Clontarf
Club titles
- Dublin titles: 0
College
- Years: College
- DCU Dóchas Éireann
College titles
- Fitzgibbon titles: 0
Inter-county*
Years	County	Apps (scores)
2017-present	Dublin	13 (0-01)
Inter-county titles
- Leinster titles: 0
- All-Irelands: 0
- NHL: 0
- All Stars: 0
- *Inter County team apps and scores correct as of 14:50, 1 July 2021.

Paddy Smyth (born 1998) is an Irish hurler who plays for Dublin Championship club Clontarf and at inter-county level with the Dublin senior hurling team. He usually lines out as a corner-back.

== Career ==
A member of the Clontarf club, Smyth first came to prominence on the inter-county scene as captain of the Dublin minor team that won the 2016 Leinster Championship. He subsequently lined out with the Dublin under-21 team as well as with DCU Dóchas Éireann in the Fitzgibbon Cup. Smyth was just out of the minor grade when he was added to the Dublin senior hurling team, making his debut during the 2017 league.

== Career statistics ==
As of match played 26 June 2021.

Team	Year	National League			Leinster		All-Ireland		Total	
Team	Year	Division	Apps	Score	Apps	Score	Apps	Score	Apps	Score
Dublin	2017	Division 1A	1	0-00	0	0-00	0	0-00	1	0-00
Dublin	2018	Division 1B	6	0-00	4	0-01	—		10	0-01
Dublin	2019	Division 1B	7	0-01	4	0-00	1	0-00	12	0-01
Dublin	2020	Division 1B	5	0-00	2	0-00	1	0-00	8	0-00
Dublin	2021	Division 1B	5	0-00	1	0-00	0	0-00	6	0-00
Career total			24	0-01	11	0-01	2	0-00	37	0-02

== Honours ==
Dublin

- Leinster Minor Hurling Championship: 2016

Sporting positions
Preceded by Eoghan O'Donnell	Dublin Senior Hurling Captain; 2024–	Succeeded by Incumbent
