= Tommy Moore (hurler) =

Irish hurler (1890-1973)

Personal information
- Native name: Tomás Ó Mórdha (Irish)
- Nickname: Tommy
- Born: 17 October 1890 Ballyragget, County Kilkenny, Ireland
- Died: 14 May 1973 (aged 82) Rathfarnham, Dublin, Ireland
- Occupation: Publican

Sport
- Sport: Hurling
Club
- Years: Club
- Faughs
Club titles
- Dublin titles: 6
Inter-county
- Years: County
- 1915–1923: Dublin
Inter-county titles
- Leinster titles: 4
- All-Irelands: 2

Thomas Moore (17 October 1890 – 14 May 1973) was an Irish sportsperson. He played hurling with the Faughs hurling club and at inter-county level for the Dublin senior hurling team. Moore also served as chairman of Faughs for forty years (from 1929 to 1969). He became a recipient of the Hall of Fame Award and the All-Ireland Senior Club Hurling Championship trophy is now called the Tommy Moore Cup.

== Biography ==
Moore allowed his pub in Cathedral Street, Dublin to be a meeting place for the club when they had nowhere else to go. His pub was a Gaelic Athletic Association (GAA) landmark and it became an annual tradition for the winning All-Ireland hurling team to bring the Liam MacCarthy Cup to the pub after the final.

== Playing career ==
=== Club ===
Moore won six Dublin Senior Hurling Championship medals with Faughs including a four in a row (1920–23).

=== Inter-county ===
At inter-county level, he won four Leinster Senior Hurling Championship medals with Dublin in 1917, 1919, 1920 and 1921. He also won two All-Ireland medals with Dublin in 1917 and 1920. In 1917, Dublin were represented by the Collegians (UCD) club and in 1920, by his own club, Faughs.

He captured his first Leinster title in 1917 following a 5–1 to 4–0 victory over Kilkenny. The subsequent All-Ireland final pitted Dublin against Tipperary. A 5–4 to 4–2 victory gave Dublin the victory and gave Moore his first All-Ireland medal.

Dublin surrendered their provincial crown in 1918, however, Kilkenny were defeated by Dublin again in 1919 giving Moore his second Leinster medal. Cork provided the opposition on that occasion, however, the Munster champions emerged victorious by 6–4 to 2–4.

Dublin retained their provincial title in 1920, giving Moore his third Leinster medal. The All-Ireland final was a replay of the previous year's encounter as Cork provided the opposition once again. Cork looked to be heading for victory, however, a four-goal blitz by Dublin sealed the 4–9 to 4–3 victory and gave Moore a second All-Ireland medal.

1921 saw Moore add a fourth Leinster memento to his collection before lining out in yet another All-Ireland final. Limerick won the game on a score line of 8–5 to 3–2.

Dublin surrendered their provincial crown the following year. However, 1923 was a special year for Moore as he captained the Dublin team that were beaten in the Leinster final by Kilkenny, 4–1 to 1–1.

Sporting positions
Preceded by Bob Mockler	Dublin Senior Hurling Captain; 1923	Succeeded by Frank Wall
