= Pádraig O'Driscoll =

Irish hurler

Personal information
- Native name: Pádraig Ó Drisceoil (Irish)
- Born: Cork, Ireland

Sport
- Sport: Hurling
- Position: Forward
Club
- Years: Club
- ?–present: Lucan Sarsfields
Inter-county
- Years: County
- ?–present: Dublin
Inter-county titles
- Leinster titles: 0

Pádraig O'Driscoll is a Dublin senior hurler at Lucan Sarsfields. O'Driscoll made substitute appearances with Dublin in the 2006 championship against Clare and Limerick although he made his first start against Wexford on 7 June 2007. While Pádraig "Tubridy" O'Driscoll is often mistaken for the famous RTÉ presenter he is actually no relation.

Originally from Carigaline in County Cork, he learnt his trade from the master Justin McCarthy and spent many's the day in Roches Point playing hurling in the alley with his hero. He captained Carrigaline to the Cork Intermediate Football Championship final, before moving to Lucan to live with his best friend Quenton. He Captained Lucan Sarsfields to the semi-final of the Dublin Senior Hurling Championship in 2009.
