= Kevin O'Reilly (hurler) =

Irish hurler

Personal information
- Native name: Caoimhín Ó Rathaille (Irish)
- Born: 1987 (age 38–39) Dublin, Ireland

Sport
- Sport: Hurling
- Position: Forward
Club
- Years: Club
- ? -Present: Lucan Sarsfields
Inter-county
- Years: County
- ?- Retired: Dublin
Inter-county titles
- Leinster titles: 0

Kevin O'Reilly (born 1987) is hurler for the Dublin senior team and Lucan Sarsfields. O'Reilly was named on the 2007 3rd Level All-Star XV for DIT due to his performance in the Fitzgibbon Cup. O'Reilly was named on the Dublin Blue Stars team five times over his club career, firstly in 2006, then in 2009, 2011, 2013 and again in 2015. O'Reilly played as a forward and was a freetaker for Dublin Hurling Team and his native club, Lucan Sarsfields.

== Playing career ==
=== Minor / U21 ===
O'Reilly won a Leinster Minor Hurling Championship medal for Dublin in 2005, with a five-point win over Wexford. He finished the game with a total of three frees and one point from play. During the same year O'Reilly won the Dublin Minor Hurling Championship with Lucan Sarsfields against Ballyboden St Endas. O'Reilly scored a total of 0–7 in the game. O'Reilly won a Leinster Under-21 Hurling Championship medal for Dublin in 2007, with a win over Offaly. O'Reilly played in the Leinster Under-21 Hurling Championship final in 2006, losing to Kilkenny GAA on a scoreline of 2–16 to 2–11 at Nowlan Park. O'Reilly was Dublin's topscorer with 0–7. O'Reilly won a Dublin Championship in 2008 with Lucan Sarsfields GAA defeating Na Fianna GAA after extra time by one point. O'Reilly finished that game with one goal and eight points.

=== Senior ===
In the 2007 National Hurling League, Kevin O'Reilly was the highest scoring player on the Dublin Hurling Team with 1-19 (1-0 pen, 0-12f, 0-2 sline, 0-1 '65'), before an injury sustained during the 2007 NFL, it was announced that O'Reilly would not be taking part in any senior hurling games for Dublin in the championship. The injury sustained was a cruciate ligament tear. He returned in for the first round of the championship in 2008 and played a major role in Lucan narrowly defeating their opponents by a point. Reilly scored 1 -11 in that game.
