= Peter Kelly (Dublin hurler) =

Irish hurler

Personal information
- Native name: Peadar Ó Ceallaigh (Irish)
- Born: 17 April 1989 (age 37) Dublin, Ireland
- Occupation: Asset Management
- Height: 1.88 m (6 ft 2 in)

Sport
- Sport: Hurling
- Position: Full Back
Club
- Years: Club
- 2006–: Lucan Sarsfields
Inter-county
- Years: County
- 2008–2016: Dublin
Inter-county titles
- Leinster titles: 1
- All-Irelands: 0
- NHL: 1
- All Stars: 1

Peter Kelly (born 17 April 1989) is an Irish hurler who plays as a full-back for Dublin and Lucan Sarsfields.

== County Hurling ==
He made his debut for Dublin in 2008 against Cork in the National Hurling League.

He won the National Hurling League with Dublin in 2011. He won an all star in 2013 after helping Dublin win the Leinster Senior Hurling Championship.

== Honours ==
- Leinster Senior Hurling Championship (1): 2013
- 1 All Star 2013
- National Hurling League Division 1B (1): 2013
- National Hurling League (1): 2011
- Leinster Under-21 Hurling Championship (1): 2010
- Leinster Minor Hurling Championship (1): 2007
