= Daire Plunkett =

Irish hurler (born 1990)

Personal information
- Native name: Daire Pluincéid (Irish)
- Born: 24 January 1990 (age 36) Dublin, Ireland

Sport
- Sport: Hurling
- Position: Midfield
Club
- Years: Club
- 2007-: St Brigid's
Inter-county
Years	County	Apps (scores)
2011-	Dublin	5 (0-2)
Inter-county titles
- Leinster titles: 0
- All-Irelands: 0
- NHL: 1
- All Stars: 0

Daire Plunkett (born 24 January 1990) is an Irish sportsperson. He plays hurling with his local club St Brigid's and has been a member of the Dublin senior inter-county team since 2011.
