= John McCaffrey (hurler) =

Irish hurler

Personal information
- Native name: Seán Mac Gafraidh (Irish)
- Born: 11 September 1987 (age 39) Dublin, Ireland
- Occupation: Games Promotion Officer
- Height: 1.78 m (5 ft 10 in)

Sport
- Sport: Hurling
- Position: Midfield
Club
- Years: Club
- 2004–: Lucan Sarsfields
Inter-county
Years	County	Apps (scores)
2006–	Dublin	21 (0–15)
Inter-county titles
- Leinster titles: 1
- NHL: 1

John McCaffrey (born 11 September 1987) is an Irish sportsperson. He plays hurling with his local club Lucan Sarsfields and has been a member of the Dublin senior inter-county team since 2006.

== Playing career ==
=== Club ===
McCaffrey plays his club hurling with the Lucan Sarsfield's club. He won a county minor championship title with the club in 2005. He also played when the club played their first ever Senior Hurling championship county final in 2013.

=== Inter-county ===
McCaffrey first lined out for the Dublin hurlers at minor level (as well as representing Dublin in minor football). He was captain of the team in 2005 as 'the Dubs' captured the Leinster title following a win over Wexford.

After success at minor level McCaffrey subsequently joined the Dublin under-21 team where he also served as captain. He won a Leinster title in this grade in 2007 following a 2–18 to 3–9 defeat of Offaly. Dublin later qualified for the All-Ireland final, however, the team was heavily defeated by Galway.

By this stage McCaffrey had already joined the Dublin senior hurling team, making his championship debut against Westmeath in 2006. In 2009 Dublin qualified for their first Leinster final since 1991, however, Kilkenny were the winners by 2–18 to 0–18.

In 2011 McCaffrey took over as Dublin senior hurling team captain due to an injury sustained by regular captain Stephen Hiney. Dublin later qualified for their first National Hurling League final in sixty-five years. In the final they over came Kilkenny in the final by 0–22 to 1–07 to win a first league title since 1939.

In July 2013, McCaffrey became the first Dublin captain to lift the Bob O'Keeffe trophy as Dublin won the Leinster hurling final against Galway by 2–25 to 2–13.

== Honours ==
- Leinster Senior Hurling Championship (1): 2013
- National Hurling League (1): 2011
- National Hurling Division 1B (1): 2013
- National Hurling Division 2 (1): 2006
- Leinster Minor Hurling Championship (1): 2005
- Leinster Under-21 Hurling Championship (1): 2007
- Dublin Minor Hurling Championship (1): 2005

Sporting positions
Preceded by Stephen Hiney	Dublin Senior Hurling Captain; 2011–2014	Succeeded by Liam Rushe
Achievements
Preceded by Shane Kavanagh (Galway)	National Hurling League Final (Div 1) winning captain 2011	Succeeded by Eoin Larkin (Kilkenny)
