= Andrew Dunphy =

Irish hurler

Personal information
- Native name: Aindriú Ó Donnchaidh (Irish)
- Born: 2000 (age 25–26) Castleknock, Dublin, Ireland
- Occupation: Student

Sport
- Sport: Hurling
- Position: Right corner-back
Club
- Years: Club
- St. Brigid's
Club titles
- Dublin titles: 0
Inter-county*
Years	County	Apps (scores)
2020-present	Dublin	1 (0-00)
Inter-county titles
- Leinster titles: 0
- All-Irelands: 0
- NHL: 0
- All Stars: 0
- *Inter County team apps and scores correct as of 14:50, 5 July 2021.

Andrew Dunphy (born 16th May 2000) is an Irish hurler who plays for Dublin Senior Championship club St. Brigid's and at inter-county level with the Dublin senior hurling team. He usually lines out as a corner-back.

== Career ==
A member of the St. Brigid's club in Castleknock, Dunphy first came to prominence at schools' level with the combined Dublin North team that won the Leinster Colleges Championship in 2018. He made his first appearance on the inter-county scene as a member of the Dublin minor team during the 2017 Leinster Championship, before later captaining the under-20 team to the Leinster Championship title in 2020. Dunphy joined the Dublin senior hurling team in 2020.

== Career statistics ==
As of 3 July 2021

Team	Year	National League			Leinster		All-Ireland		Total	
Team	Year	Division	Apps	Score	Apps	Score	Apps	Score	Apps	Score
Dublin	2020	Division 1B	4	0-00	0	0-00	0	0-00	4	0-00
Dublin	2021	Division 1B	4	0-04	1	0-00	0	0-00	5	0-04
Career total			8	0-04	1	0-00	0	0-00	9	0-04

== Honours ==
Dublin North

- Leinster Colleges Senior Hurling Championship: 2018

Dublin

- Leinster Under-20 Hurling Championship: 2020 (c)

Sporting positions
Preceded by Diarmuid Ó Floinn	Dublin Under-20 Hurling Captain; 2020	Succeeded by Incumbent
