= 1947 Dublin Senior Hurling Championship =

Annual hurling competition season

- Champions: University College Dublin (2nd title)
- Runners-up: Faughs

The 1947 Dublin Senior Hurling Championship was the 60th staging of the Dublin Senior Hurling Championship since its establishment by the Dublin County Board in 1887.

Faughs entered the championship as the defending champions.

The final was played on 8 June 1947 at Croke Park in Dublin, between University College Dublin and Faughs, in what was their third meeting in the final overall. UCD won the match by 4–09 to 6–02 to claim their second championship title overall and a first title in 13 years.

== Results ==
=== Final ===
8 June 1947 Final	University College Dublin	4-09 - 6-02	Faughs	Croke Park
