= Sean Murray (Gaelic footballer) =

Irish Gaelic footballer

Seán Murray
Personal information
- Nickname: Murray
- Born: Dublin, Ireland

Sport
- Sport: Gaelic football
- Position: Full Back
Club
- Years: Club
- St Brigid's
Club titles
- Dublin titles: 1
Inter-county
- Years: County
- 2010–: Dublin
Inter-county titles
- Leinster titles: 1
- All-Irelands: 1

Sean Murray is a Gaelic footballer who plays for the St Brigid's club and for the Dublin county team. He won the Leinster Senior Football Championship and the All-Ireland Senior Football Championship in 2011 as a squad member with Dublin. He won the 2011 Dublin Senior Football Championship with his club St Brigid's.
