= 1971 Dublin Senior Hurling Championship =

Annual hurling competition season

- Champions: Craobh Chiaráin (1st title)
- Runners-up: St Vincent's

The 1971 Dublin Senior Hurling Championship was the 84th staging of the Dublin Senior Hurling Championship since its establishment by the Dublin County Board in 1887.

Faughs entered the championship as the defending champions.

The final was played on 12 September 1971 at Parnell Park in Donnycarney, between Craobh Chiaráin and St Vincent's, in what was their first ever meeting in the final. Craobh Chiaráin won the match by 3–18 to 3–06 to claim their first ever championship title.

== Results ==
=== Final ===
12 September 1971 Final	Craobh Chiaráin	3-18 - 3-06	St Vincent's	Parnell Park
