= Jimmy Boggan =

Irish hurler

Jimmy Boggan (August 1938 – 6 February 2009) was a mentor for the Dublin hurling team when they won the All-Ireland Minor Hurling Championship in 1965. Jim, as he was known within Crumlin, was a member of Crumlin GAA club in south County Dublin. In 2007 Jimmy was inducted into the Dublin Hurling Hall of Fame.
