= Eoghan O'Donnell =

Irish hurler (born 1995)

Personal information
- Native name: Eoghan Ó Dónaill (Irish)
- Born: 1996 (age 29–30) Harare, Zimbabwe
- Occupation: Student

Sport
- Sport: Hurling
- Position: Full-back
Club
- Years: Club
- Whitehall Colmcille
Club titles
- Dublin titles: 0
College
- Years: College
- 2015-present: DCU Dóchas Éireann
College titles
- Fitzgibbon titles: 0
Inter-county*
Years	County	Apps (scores)
2016-present	Dublin	10 (0-00)
Inter-county titles
- Leinster titles: 0
- All-Irelands: 0
- NHL: 0
- All Stars: 0
- *Inter County team apps and scores correct as of 16:59, 25 March 2019.

Eoghan O'Donnell (born 1995) is an Irish hurler who plays for Dublin Senior Championship club Whitehall Colmcille and at inter-county level with the Dublin senior hurling team. He usually lines out as a full-back. He was born in Harare, Zimbabwe, where his parents were teachers and working for a charity. He has opted to play for the Dublin senior footballers for the 2025 season under Dessie Farrell.

== Career statistics ==
As of match played 24 March 2019.

Team	Year	National League			Leinster		All-Ireland		Total	
Team	Year	Division	Apps	Score	Apps	Score	Apps	Score	Apps	Score
Dublin	2016	Division 1A	6	0-00	2	0-00	1	0-00	9	0-00
Dublin	2017	Division 1A	6	0-00	1	0-00	2	0-00	9	0-00
Dublin	2018	Division 1B	5	0-01	4	0-00	—		9	0-01
Dublin	2019	Division 1B	7	0-01	0	0-00	0	0-00	7	0-01
Career total			24	0-02	7	0-00	3	0-00	34	0-02

== Honours ==
Dublin

- Leinster Under-21 Hurling Championship (1): 2016
- Leinster Minor Hurling Championship (1): 2012

Sporting positions
Preceded by Danny Sutcliffe	Dublin Senior Hurling Captain; 2022–2023	Succeeded by Paddy Smyth
