= Danny McCormack (hurler) =

Irish hurler

Personal information
- Native name: Dónall Mac Cormaic (Irish)
- Born: 1876 Borrisoleigh, County Tipperary, Ireland
- Died: 1938 (aged 61–62) Dublin, Ireland
- Occupation: Bread van driver

Sport
- Sport: Hurling
Club
- Years: Club
- Faughs
Club titles
- Dublin titles: 7
Inter-county
- Years: County
- 1899-1912: Dublin
Inter-county titles
- Leinster titles: 3
- All-Irelands: 0

Daniel "Danny" McCormack (1876-1938) was an Irish hurler who played for the Dublin senior team.

Born in Borrisoleigh, County Tipperary, McCormack first arrived on the inter-county scene at the age of twenty-four when he first linked up with the Dublin senior. He made his debut during the 1899 championship. McCormack immediately became a regular member of the starting fifteen and won three Leinster medals. He was an All-Ireland runner-up on two occasions.

At club level, McCormack was a seven-time championship medallist with Faughs.

McCormack retired from inter-county hurling following the conclusion of the 1912 championship.
