= Dan Devitt =

Irish hurler

Personal information
- Native name: Dónall Mac Daibhéid (Irish)
- Born: 1916 Kilcommon, County Tipperary, Ireland
- Died: September 2003 (aged 87) Tallaght, Dublin, Ireland
- Occupation: Assistant Garda Commissioner

Sport
- Sport: Hurling
Club
- Years: Club
- Faughs
Club titles
- Dublin titles: 7
Inter-county
- Years: County
- 1939-1945: Dublin
Inter-county titles
- Leinster titles: 3
- All-Irelands: 0
- NHL: 0

Daniel Devitt (1916 - September 2003) was an Irish hurler. His championship career with the Dublin senior team lasted seven seasons from 1939 until 1945.

== Honours ==
Faughs

- Dublin Senior Hurling Championship (7): 1936, 1939, 1940, 1941, 1944, 1945, 1946

Dublin

- Leinster Senior Hurling Championship (3): 1941, 1942, 1944
