= Graham Norton (Gaelic footballer) =

Irish Gaelic footballer

Personal information
- Native name: Graham Ó Neachtain (Irish)
- Born: Dublin, Ireland

Sport
- Sport: Gaelic football
- Position: Left Half Forward
Club
- Years: Club
- ? - Present: St Brigid's
Inter-county
- Years: County
- Present: Dublin
Inter-county titles
- Leinster titles: 1

Graham Norton is a Gaelic footballer who plays for the St Brigid's club and the Dublin county team.
