= Derek O'Reilly =

Irish hurler

Personal information
- Native name: Derek Ó Rathaille (Irish)
- Nickname: Smilie
- Born: Dublin, Ireland

Sport
- Sport: Hurling
- Position: Left half back
Club
- Years: Club
- ? -Present: Craobh Chiarain
Club titles
- Dublin titles: 3
Inter-county
- Years: County
- ?- Present: Dublin
Inter-county titles
- Leinster titles: 0

Derek O'Reilly is a hurler for Dublin and Craobh Chiaráin. Derek won a Dublin Senior Hurling Championship medal with Craobh Chiaráin in 2006. O'Reilly scored a (0-2f) in the final against Ballyboden in a game that finished with the score 2-10 to 2-8. O'Reilly was named on the Dublin Blue Stars team for 2006 at right half back.
