= Philip Brennan (Dublin hurler) =

Irish hurler and Gaelic footballer

Personal information
- Native name: Pilib Ó Braonáin (Irish)
- Born: Dublin, Ireland

Sport
- Sport: Hurling
- Position: Centre Back
Club
- Years: Club
- O'Tooles
Club titles
- Dublin titles: 1
Inter-county
- Years: County
- Dublin
Inter-county titles
All-Ireland Titles	1 (U21)	

Philip Brennan (born 1983) is a hurler for Dublin and O'Tooles. Philip captained Dublin to victory against Westmeath in the 2006 Liam MacCarthy Cup and has continued his role as Dublin Senior Hurling captain in 2007. The victory insured Dublins place in the 2007 Liam MacCarthy Cup. Brennan won a Dublin Senior Hurling Championship medal with O'Tooles in 2002.

Philip won an All-Ireland Under-21 Football Championship medal with Dublin in 2003.

Preceded by David Curtin	Dublin Senior Hurling Captain; 2006–2007	Succeeded by Stephen Hiney
