= Mick Neville (hurler born 1891) =

Irish hurler

Personal information
- Native name: Mícheál Ó Nia (Irish)
- Born: 14 February 1891 Kilfinny, County Limerick, Ireland
- Died: 12 September 1973 (aged 82) Kilfinny, County Limerick, Ireland
- Occupation: Publican

Sport
- Sport: Hurling
- Position: Full-forward
Clubs
- Years: Club
- 1911–1922 1923–1929: Faughs; Croagh-Kilfinny
Club titles
- Dublin titles: 6
Inter-county
- Years: County
- 1913–1922 1923–1924: Dublin; Limerick
Inter-county titles
- Munster titles: 1
- Leinster titles: 4
- All-Irelands: 2

Michael Neville (14 February 1891 – 12 September 1973) was an Irish hurler who played as a full-forward for the Dublin and Limerick senior teams from 1913 to 1924.

Neville made his first appearance for the Dublin team during the 1913 championship and became a regular player over much of the next decade. During that time, he won two All-Ireland winner's medals and four Leinster winner's medals. Neville later joined the Limerick team, winning one Munster winners' medal.

At club level, Neville enjoyed a successful career with Faughs in Dublin, winning six county club championship winners' medals. He ended his club career with the Croagh-Kilfinny club in Limerick.

The new county grounds in Rathkeale were gifted to the County Board by the Neville family, so they were named Mick Neville Park in his honour.
