= Danny Sutcliffe =

Irish hurler (born 1992)

Personal information
- Born: 24 February 1992 (age 34) Dublin, Ireland
- Occupation: Student
- Height: 1.89 m (6 ft 2 in)

Sport
- Sport: Hurling
- Position: Left half forward
Club
- Years: Club
- 2009–: St Jude's
Inter-county
Years	County	Apps (scores)
2011–2015; 2018–	Dublin	22 (1-22)
Inter-county titles
- Leinster titles: 1
- All-Irelands: 0
- NHL: 1
- All Stars: 1

Danny Sutcliffe (born 24 February 1992) is a hurler who plays for the St Jude's club and at senior level for the Dublin county team. Sutcliffe was part of the Dublin minor football team in 2009 whom he won a Leinster title.

Sutcliffe later became one of the "well-known names on the New York side" that competes in the Connacht Senior Football Championship, according to the Irish Independent.

== Honours ==
Dublin

- Leinster Minor Football Championship (1): 2009
- Leinster Under-21 Hurling Championship (1): 2011
- Walsh Cup (1): 2013
- Leinster Senior Hurling Championship (1): 2013
- National Hurling League Division 1B (1): 2013
- All Star (1): 2013

Sporting positions
Preceded by Seán Moran	Dublin Senior Hurling Captain; 2020–2021	Succeeded by Eoghan O'Donnell
