= Alan Nolan (hurler) =

Dublin hurling goalkeeper

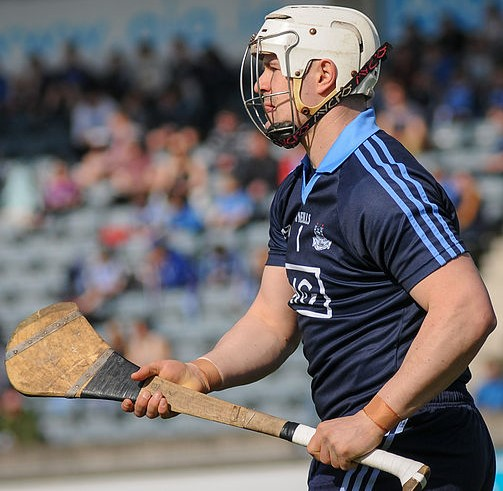

Personal information
- Native name: Alan Ó Nualláin (Irish)
- Born: 4 June 1985 (age 41) Dublin, Ireland
- Occupation: Plumber
- Height: 1.75 m (5 ft 9 in)

Sport
- Sport: Hurling
- Position: Goalkeeper
Club
- Years: Club
- 2003–present: St Brigid's
Inter-county*
Years	County	Apps (scores)
2006–2015; 2017–2022	Dublin	18 (0–3)
Inter-county titles
- Leinster titles: 1
- All-Irelands: 0
- NFL: 1
- All Stars: 0
- *Inter County team apps and scores correct as of 16:28, 4 July 2021.

Alan Nolan (born 4 June 1985) is an Irish hurler who plays for Dublin Senior Championship club St Brigid's and formerly at inter-county level with the Dublin senior hurling team. He was named on the Dublin Blue Stars team for 2006.

== Career statistics ==
As of 3 July 2021.

Team	Year	National League			Leinster		All-Ireland		Total	
Team	Year	Division	Apps	Score	Apps	Score	Apps	Score	Apps	Score
Dublin	2006	Division 2A	1	0-00	0	0-00	0	0-00	1	0-00
Dublin	2007	Division 1B	0	0-00	0	0-00	1	0-00	1	0-00
Dublin	2008	Division 1A	0	0-00	0	0-00	0	0-00	0	0-00
Dublin	2009	Division 1	3	0-00	0	0-00	0	0-00	3	0-00
Dublin	2010	Division 1	0	0-00	0	0-00	0	0-00	0	0-00
Dublin	2011	Division 1	0	0-00	0	0-00	0	0-00	0	0-00
Dublin	2012	Division 1A	1	0-00	0	0-00	0	0-00	1	0-00
Dublin	2013	Division 1B	4	0-02	0	0-00	0	0-00	4	0-02
Dublin	2014	Division 1A	0	0-00	2	0-00	1	0-00	3	0-00
Dublin	2015	Division 1A	5	0-00	2	0-00	0	0-00	7	0-00
Dublin	2016	Division 1A	—		—		—		—	
Dublin	2017	Division 1A	—		—		—		—	
Dublin	2018	Division 1A	6	0-00	4	0-02	—		10	0-02
Dublin	2019	Division 1B	7	0-01	4	0-01	1	0-00	12	0-02
Dublin	2020	Division 1B	3	0-00	1	0-00	1	0-00	5	0-00
Dublin	2021	Division 1B	2	0-00	1	0-00	0	0-00	3	0-00
Career total			32	0-03	14	0-03	4	0-00	50	0-06

== Honours ==
Dublin

- Leinster Senior Hurling Championship: 2013
- National Hurling League Division 1: 2011
- National Hurling League Division 1B: 2013
- National Hurling League Division 2: 2006
- Walsh Cup: 2011, 2013
