= Sean Power (hurler) =

Irish hurler

Sean Power is a former inter-county hurler for Dublin, a Commercials hurling club captain and a former player with St Mary's GFC^{[usurped]} in Saggart.

Power made his debut for Dublin against Galway in the 1992 National Hurling League, with his Championship debut following against Wexford in 1993. His final game for Dublin was a 2001 Leinster Senior Hurling Championship match. He started his Dublin career as a half-back but reverted to full-back for the majority of his intercounty career. He was also captain during the 1999 and 2000 seasons.

Power won a Division 2 National League medal with Dublin in 1997, played with Leinster in 1996, 1997 and 1998, winning a Railway Cup medal in 1998. With Commercials he won Under 21, Intermediate and Senior B Championships and a Junior football championship with St Mary's. He also represented Ireland against Scotland in the composite rules shinty-hurling games in 1995 and 1998. After retiring he started coaching with various Dublin underage teams and was U20 manager for the 2021 & 2022 seasons.

‘We didn’t produce our best on the day’ – Dublin South Schools manager Seán Power after Leinster final loss Sean Power 1985 – 1990 HFCS Dublin U20s hurling manager Seán Power speaks to DubsTV after win over Offaly
