= Martin Hayes (hurler) =

Irish hurler

Personal information
- Native name: Máirtín Ó hAodha (Irish)

Sport
- Sport: Hurling
- Position: Full-back
Club
- Years: Club
- Faughs
Club titles
- Dublin titles: 4
Inter-county
- Years: County
- 1917-1928: Dublin
Inter-county titles
- Leinster titles: 4
- All-Irelands: 3
- NHL: 0

Martin Hayes (1 September 1890 - 27 September 1967) was an Irish hurler who played as a full-back for the Dublin senior team.

Hayes joined the team during the 1917 championship and was a regular member of the starting fifteen until his retirement after the 1928 championship. During that time he won three All-Ireland medals and four Leinster medals.

At club level Hayes was a four-county club championship medallist with Faughs.
