= Friends of Dublin Hurling =

Hurling organisation founded in 2002

Friends of Dublin Hurling (FODH) is an organisation established in 2002 to help project a dynamic image of hurling in Dublin. It organises many events and social functions to enable this to be achieved.

One of the main FODH events is the annual golf classic held in May each year in Castlewarden Golf Club. FODH also raises funding through membership fees and has made this funding available to county teams for training related activities. In 2008 it supported the Dublin colleges' teams that won Leinster ‘A’ hurling titles at senior and juvenile level. In addition, FODH organises buses to take Dublin hurling supporters to matches around the country and a cash incentive is made available for clubs to organise a supporters’ bus to certain games.

The inaugural ‘Celebration of Dublin Hurling’ took place in 2007 in the Red Cow Hotel and attracted four hundred and fifty people, and there was a full house at the second annual event in the Grand Hotel in Malahide. At this annual event, FODH recognise the achievements of hurlers from Dublin and the ‘Senior Hurler of the Year’, ‘Young Hurler of the Year’ and ‘Hall of Fame Award’ recipients are honoured. The 2007 Hall of Fame inductee was Jimmy Boggan (Crumlin). In addition, the work being done by clubs for the development of hurling in Dublin is recognised through the ‘Club of the Year’ awards at senior, intermediate and junior level.

== Winners of Young Hurler of the Year ==
- Alan McCrabbe (Craobh Chiaráin) – 2007
- Liam Rushe – 2011
