= Kevin Flynn (hurler, born 1976) =

Irish hurler

Personal information
- Native name: Caoimhín Ó Floinn (Irish)
- Born: 1976 (age 49–50) Belfast, Northern Ireland

Sport
- Sport: Hurling
- Position: Full Forward
Clubs
- Years: Club
- 1992 - 2011 2012 - 2013: O'Tooles GAC; Harry Bolands, Chicago
Club titles
- Dublin titles: 4
Inter-county**
Years	County	Apps (scores)
1995–2010	Dublin	38 (6-45)
Inter-county titles
- Leinster titles: 0
- **Inter County team apps and scores correct as of (00:03, 6 September 2006 (UTC)).

Kevin Flynn (born 1976) (Irish: Caoimhín Ó Floinn) is a former inter-county hurler for Dublin and former O'Tooles player.

== Club ==
Flynn was named on the Dublin Blue Stars team on seven occasions, most recently in 2007. He won four Dublin Senior Hurling Championship medals with O'Tooles in 2002, 1997, 1996 and 1995 and a Dublin Senior Hurling League in 2006.

In 2011, he immigrated to Chicago and led Harry Bolands to titles in 2012 & 2013 acting as player/manager.

== Inter County ==
He captained Dublin to their Walsh Cup win over Kilkenny in 2003 and also won two division two National Hurling Leagues, the most recent one in 2006. He has also played Railway Cup for Leinster.

Flynn made his league debut in October 1995 with a win over Limerick in Croke Park. He went on to make his championship debut the following summer when Dublin were defeated by Wexford by five points in the Leinster semi-final.

In 2002, he finished in 8th position in the overall Hurling Top Scorers list. Flynn was well-known, along with others for giving his time to autograph hunters and fans after games.

== Honours ==
O'Tooles

- Dublin Senior Hurling Championship:
  - (gold) Winners (4): 1995, 1996, 1997, 2002
  - (silver) Runners-up (1): 2011
- Dublin Senior Hurling League:
  - (gold) Winners (1): 2006

Dublin

- National Hurling League Division 2:
  - (gold) Winners (2): 1997, 2006
- Walsh Cup:
  - (gold) Winners (1): 2003

Individual

- Dublin Blue Stars: 1996, 1997, 2002, 2006, 2007

Preceded by David Sweeney	Dublin Senior Hurling Captain; 2004 & 2005	Succeeded by David Curtin
