= David Curtin =

Irish hurler

Personal information
- Born: 13 September 1980 (age 46) Dublin, Ireland
- Occupation: Teacher

Sport
- Sport: Hurling
- Position: Centre back
Club
- Years: Club
- Ballyboden St Enda's
Club titles
- Dublin titles: 5
Inter-county
- Years: County
- 2001-2012: Dublin
Inter-county titles
- Leinster titles: 1

David Curtin (was born on September 13, 1980) is an inter-county hurling player who plays for Dublin. He plays his club hurling for Dublin side Ballyboden St Enda's. In 2005, he will be remembered for his astounding performance against Laois which confirmed Dublins All-Ireland status for the 2006 championship. Curtin finished the game with an impressive scoreline of 1–7. In the 2006 All-Ireland championship, this feat was repeated when Dublin swept aside Westmeath to once retain their Liam MacCarthy Cup status. He finished the 2006 championship with a scoreline of 0-33, a scoreline which left him 5th of the top scorer list despite Dublins lack of progress in the All-Ireland championship. Curtin was the Dublin hurling captain for 2005. David was named on the 2006 Dublin Bus/Evening Herald Blue Star hurling XV at centre forward. Curtin won his first Dublin Senior Hurling Championship medal with his club Ballyboden St Endas in October 2007. Since then Boden have won 4 titles in a row. The 2007 Dublin championship win qualified Ballyboden to play in their first ever Leinster Senior Club Hurling Championship game against Oulart the Ballagh GAA of Wexford. Boden won the game by 1–17 to 0–15 with Curtin scoring a total of 0-04.

Preceded by Kevin Flynn	Dublin Senior Hurling Captain; 2005	Succeeded by Philip Brennan
