= Stephen Hiney =

Irish hurler

Personal information
- Born: 27 October 1983 (age 43) Dublin, Ireland
- Height: 1.87 m (6 ft 2 in)

Sport
- Sport: Hurling
- Position: Right half back
Club
- Years: Club
- 2000-: Ballyboden St Enda's
Club titles
	Football	Hurling
Dublin titles	2	6
Inter-county
- Years: County
- 2002-2014: Dublin
Inter-county titles
- Leinster titles: 1
- NHL: 1

Stephen Hiney (born 27 October 1983) is a hurler for Ballyboden St Enda's and formerly Dublin. Hiney was the 2008 captain of the Dublin Senior Hurling team. Hiney won his first Dublin Senior Hurling Championship medal with his club Ballyboden St Enda's in October 2007 his second in 2008, his third (with a sore leg) in 2009 and his fourth in 2010. The 2007 Dublin championship win qualified Ballyboden to play in their first ever Leinster Senior Club Hurling Championship game against Oulart-The Ballagh of Wexford. Boden won the game by 1–17 to 0–15. Ballyboden lost in the 2007 Leinster Final against Birr of Offaly.

He won a Senior Football Championship medal with Ballyboden in 2009 together with Hurling Championship and League medals. He is captain of the Dublin Senior Hurling Team and travelled to Argentina with the GAA All-Stars in December 2009. Stephen was back to his powerful self in 2010 having missed a lot of games in 2009 with a sore leg. In a League game for Dublin against Wexford in March 2011, he damaged his cruciate and missed the remainder of the season for both County and Club. After a successful operation and recovery, Hiney made his comeback in a club league game with Ballyboden St Enda's on 19 April 2012.

Hiney announced his retirement from inter-county hurling in December 2014.

Preceded by Philip Brennan	Dublin Senior Hurling Captain; 2008	Succeeded by John McCaffrey
