= Gary Maguire =

Irish hurler and Gaelic footballer

Personal information
- Native name: Garraí Mag Uidhir (Irish)
- Born: 26 June 1983 (age 43) Dublin, Ireland
- Occupation: Engineer
- Height: 6 ft 1 in (185 cm)

Sport
- Sport: Hurling
- Position: Goalkeeper
Club
- Years: Club
- 2001–: Ballyboden St Enda's
Club titles
- Dublin titles: 7
Inter-county
Years	County	Apps (scores)
2004–2018	Dublin	36 (0-0)
Inter-county titles
- Leinster titles: 1
- NHL: 1
- All Stars: 1

Gary Maguire (born 26 June 1983) is an Irish former hurler who played as a goalkeeper for the senior Dublin county team.

Maguire made his first appearance for the team during the 2004 National League and has been Dublin's first-choice goalkeeper since then. Since then he has won one National Hurling League medal and one All-Star award. Maguire has been a runner-up in two Leinster finals.

At club level Maguire plays with Ballyboden St Enda's and has won five consecutive county club championship medals.

== Playing career ==
=== Club ===
Maguire began his senior club career as a dual player with Ballyboden St Enda's; however, he gave up on Gaelic football to concentrate on his hurling career.

After facing some one-point defeats in a number of championship deciders, Ballyboden St Enda's reached the county final once again in 2007. A 2–13 to 1-5 trouncing of St Vincent's gave Ballyboden their first ever championship. It was a first championship medal for Maguire. Ballyboden St Enda's went on to dominate club hurling in Dublin for the rest of the decade. Subsequent county final defeats of Kilmacud Crokes, Craobh Chiaráin, St Vincent's again and O'Toole's gave Ballyboden a record-equaling five championship titles in-a-row. Maguire played a key role in goal in all of these victories, including being named Dublin Hurler of the Year in 2010.

=== Inter-county ===
Maguire first came to prominence on the inter-county scene as goalkeeper on the Dublin minor hurling team in 2000. He spent two seasons with the minors and enjoyed little success, having ended up on the losing side to Offaly in the 2000 Leinster final.

After later joining the Dublin under-21 team, Maguire featured when the team lost back-to-back provincial deciders in 2002 and 2003.

Maguire was still a member of the Dublin under-21 team when he made his senior debut in a National Hurling League game against Kilkenny. He made his championship debut later that same year in a Leinster quarter-final against Westmeath.

His first few championship seasons saw Dublin face some narrow losses in the provincial series of games, however, in 2009 Maguire's side qualified for a first Leinster final in eighteen years. A 2–18 to 0–18 score line gave victory to Kilkenny.

After a disappointing championship in 2010, 'the Dubs' qualified for the National League final in 2011, their first decider in over seventy years. A 0–22 to 1–7 defeat of Kilkenny gave Maguire a National League winners' medal. Both sides met again in the Leinster final that day, however, the result was reversed. A 4–17 to 1–15 score line gave victory to 'the Cats'. In spite of this defeat Dublin remained in the championship and reached an All-Ireland semi-final against reigning All-Ireland champions Tipperary. Maguire's side gave Tipp an almighty scare, however, the champions narrowly won by 1–19 to 0–18. Maguire finished off the season by winning his very first All-Star award.

Maguire retired from the inter-county scene after the 2018 season along with club mate Shane Durkin, Maguire bowed out having represented Dublin for 15 seasons.

=== Inter-provincial ===
Maguire has also been picked for the Leinster inter-provincial hurling team for the Railway Cup competition.

== Honours ==
- 6 Dublin Senior Hurling Championship 2007 2008 2009 2010 2011 2013
- 1 Leinster Senior Hurling Championship 2013
- 1 All-Star 2011
- 1 National Hurling League Division 1 2011
- 1 National Hurling League Division 1B 2013
- 1 National Hurling League Division 2 2006
- 1 Railway Cup 2012
