= St Brigid's GAA (Dublin) =

Sports club in County Dublin, Ireland

St Brigid's GAA Club
- Cumann Naomh Bríd
- Founded: 1932
- County: Dublin
- Nickname: The Redmen
- Colours: Red and white
- Grounds: Russell Park
- Coordinates: 53°22′39.09″N 6°21′04.55″W

Playing kits
Standard colours

Senior Club Championships
	All Ireland	Leinster champions	Dublin champions
Football:	0	1	2

St Brigid's GAA Club (Irish: Cumann Naomh Bríd) is a Gaelic Athletic Association club based in Castleknock, Fingal, Ireland which serves Castleknock, Clonsilla, Blanchardstown and Corduff. Its grounds are at Russell Park. The club supports over 80 teams, from nursery level (four- to seven-year-olds) to adults, in hurling, football, camogie, women's football, handball and badminton.

In 2003, St Brigid's won a first Dublin Senior Football Championship (SFC) and Leinster Club SFC. The club won its second Dublin SFC title in 2011, but lost the year's Leinster Club SFC final to Garrycastle in an injury-time free goal.

St Brigid's senior hurlers lost the 2003 Senior A Hurling final to Craobh Chiarán and the 2019 final to Cuala. The team lost in the semi-finals in 2011 and 2013. St Brigid's senior hurlers won the Senior B and AHL 2 League titles in 2010 and 2014. The club has rivalries with the Castleknock GAA and Oliver Plunketts/Eoghan Ruadh GAA clubs. Dual All Ireland Handball Senior Singles champion Eoin Kennedy is a club member.

In 2007, Justin McNulty was manager. In 2013, Tony McEntee was appointed as manager of the St Brigid's senior football team, succeeding Gerry McEntee and Mark Byrne.

Deputy Leader of Fianna Fáil, Minister Jack Chambers, who also previously served as Minister for Sport (2020–2022), is a member of the club.

== Honours ==
- Leinster Senior Club Football Championship (1): 2003
- Leinster Junior Club Football Championship (1): 1996
- Dublin Senior Football Championship (2): 2003, 2011
- Dublin Intermediate Football Championship (5): 1958, 1980, 1992, 2005, 2010
- Dublin Junior Football Championship (2): 1996, 2010
- Dublin AFL Division 1 (3): 2013, 2005, 1999
- Dublin Senior B Hurling Championship (1): 2009
- Dublin Intermediate Hurling Championship (2): 1975, 1990

== Notable players ==
=== Senior inter-county men's footballers ===
- Dublin
  - Peadar Andrews
  - Kevin Bonner
  - Paddy Andrews
  - Barry Cahill
  - Declan Lally
  - Sean Murray
  - Graham Norton
  - Shane Supple
  - Philip Ryan
- Laois
  - John O'Loughlin
- Leitrim
  - Emlyn Mulligan

=== Senior inter-county hurlers ===
- Dublin
  - Alan Nolan
  - Daire Plunkett
  - Andrew Dunphy
  - Cian O'Sullivan
- Fermanagh
  - Ciaran Breslin
- Leitrim
  - Tadhg Branagan

=== Handball players ===
- Dublin
  - Eoin Kennedy

=== Senior inter-county ladies' footballers ===
- Dublin
  - Noëlle Healy
  - Ashling Nyhan
  - Colleen Barrett
  - Sorcha Furlong
  - Elaine Kelly
  - Ailish McKenna
  - Noelle Healy
  - Ciara Trant
  - Deirdre Murphy
  - Ellen Gribben

=== Others ===
- Ireland women's national field hockey team
  - Sarah Hawkshaw
- Connacht Rugby
  - David Hawkshaw
  - Daniel Hawkshaw
- Irish Rugby Munster Rugby
  - Tom Farrell

== See also ==
- Gael Linn Cup 1977
- Gael Linn Cup 1981
- Gael Linn Cup 1995
- Gael Linn Cup 1996
- Gael Linn Cup 1997
- Gael Linn Cup 2007
- 1979 National Camogie League
- 1981 National Camogie League
- 1983 National Camogie League
