= Lucan Sarsfields GAA =

Sports club in County Dublin, Ireland

- Na Sáirséalaigh Léamhcáin
- Founded: 1886
- County: Dublin
- Colours: White and Green

Playing kits
Standard colours

Lucan Sarsfields (Irish: Sáirséalaigh Leamhcáin) is a Gaelic Athletic Association club based in Lucan, Dublin, Ireland. Founded in 1886, Sarsfields were one of 16 teams which contested the Dublin Senior Championship in 1887. They were also involved in the Senior Championship of 1892, and the club has fielded Gaelic football, hurling and camogie teams ever since.

== History ==
=== Early years ===
Lucan won the Intermediate Football League in the 1904–05 season. It is reported that they did this with the help of five players from France. The story goes that in 1902 a team call Balbriggan Wanderers won the Intermediate League and then for some reason or other went out of existence in 1904. One of the players on that team was a man named Paddy Richardson, who was a fish merchant and regularly attended the Dublin market. At the market he met up with Mickey Ashe who was secretary of Lucan and who also worked in the fish market. With the assistance of Tom Clarke, another fish market worker, the Balbriggan men were persuaded to throw in their lot with Lucan and the result was the winning of the league that year.

The same season also saw the hurlers win their league and being presented with the Michael Smith Cup. Lucan had to wait another 70 years to see this cup again when they won the Junior A League in 1974.

In 1904–05, Lucan Sarsfields also won the Camogie Championship.

The club's footballers were prominent in the 1920s and 1930s. The high point of this era was a victory over a Garda team in 1929 who were the Dublin Senior Football Championship winners at the time.

The hurlers captured the limelight in the 1960s winning the Junior 'B' Hurling League. They won the Corn Céitinn in 1966 and so became the first Junior Hurling team ever to capture this title.

=== 1970s and 1980s ===
The club's footballers were back to the forefront in the 1970s with the help of the club's active juvenile section. The winning of the Dublin Junior Football Championship in 1977 and entry into Intermediate ranks quickly followed success at Under 21 level.

In 1988 a huge ambition was realised when Senior status was achieved. They beat St. Anne's in the Intermediate League Final. Some lean times followed and it reverted to Intermediate status.

=== 1990s ===
The footballers again achieved Senior status in 1995 following a Dublin Intermediate Football Championship victory over St Vincents after a replay in Lawless Park in Swords. Further success followed and the footballers now compete in Division 1 of the Senior Football League. In 1998, the intermediate hurlers won three cup competitions, Corn Céitinn, Corn Fogarty and Corn. They followed up with in 1999 by winning the Intermediate League and Dublin Intermediate Hurling Championship and were competing in Division 2 of the Senior Hurling League.

== Club grounds ==
For many years the club had no permanent pitches. In the early years, games were played at the 12 Lock, Bleach Green in the Demesne (close to Weir View), in a field behind Vesey Park and later on land in Doddsboro, in Tandy's Lane and in Ballydowd. On the morning of a game some of the club members would go to one of these fields and erect posts which would have to be taken down that evening.

In 1952, the Dublin County Board leased grounds in Ballydowd, behind the Foxhunter Pub and gave the club official use of these grounds. This was home for the club for the next 18 years. Dressing rooms consisted of old wooden railway carriages.

In 1970 however, the County Board lost control of the ground and the club was again homeless until granted the use of County Council pitches in Doddsboro where Airlie Heights is now situated.

1976 saw the club move again, this time to County Council grounds near Arthur Griffith Park. It was around this time that the club realised the need for a home of its own and, in 1978, the grounds at the 12th Lock were purchased for the sum of £51,500. Initial finance was provided by members by way of an interest free loan of £50 per head.

Following significant population growth in Lucan in the late 20th century, and new membership of the Lucan Sarsfields club, a new clubhouse was built in 2001. This facility has a bar and function room, viewing balcony, 5 dressing rooms with showers, gym and club shop.

In the early 21st century, the club decided to undertake a project to develop an all-weather playing facility at its grounds at 12th Lock. It was decided that the training pitch would be developed into a 100 m × 60 m synthetic surface. Work commenced during the summer of 2009 and was completed by December 2009. The fully flood lit pitch is enclosed by fencing and netting and was officially opened by the Taoiseach Brian Cowen in February 2010.

== Honours ==
- Dublin Senior Hurling Championship: Runner-Up: 2013, 2025
- Dublin Intermediate Football Championship: Winner 1995
- Dublin Intermediate Hurling Championship; Winner 1999
- Dublin Junior Football Championship: Winner 1977, 2003
- Dublin Junior B Football Championship Winners 2001
- Dublin Junior 6 Football Championship: Winner 2023
- Dublin Junior B Hurling Championship Winner 2012, Runner-up 2023
- Dublin Junior F Hurling Championship Winner 2013, 2025
- Dublin Under 21 Football Championship: Winner 2006, 2010
- Dublin Under 21 Hurling Championship: Winner 2014, 2019, 2024
- Dublin Under 19 Hurling Championship: Winner 2023
- Dublin Minor B Football Championship Winners 2005, 2009, 2011
- Dublin Minor D Football Championship Winners 2007
- Dublin Minor A Hurling Championship Winner 2005, 2023, 2025
- Dublin Minor B Hurling Championship Winners 2001, 2007
- Dublin AFL Div. 7 Winner 2015
- Dublin AFL Div. 11 North Winner 2017

== Notable players ==
- Jack Sheedy - former Dublin inter-county footballer.
- Tommy Carr - former Dublin inter-county footballer and manager.
- Paul Casey - former Dublin inter-county footballer and All Ireland Winner.
- Stephen O’Shaughnessy - former Dublin inter-county footballer.
- Kevin O'Reilly - former Dublin heavy weight inter-county hurler.
- John McCaffrey - current Dublin inter-county hurling captain
- Pádraig O'Driscoll - former Dublin inter-county Hurler
- Peter Kelly - Dublin inter-county hurler.
