= Faughs GAA Club =

Sports club in County Dublin, Ireland

Faughs
- Fág an bealach
- Founded: 1885
- County: Dublin
- Colours: Gold with green sash
- Grounds: Wellington Lane, Templeogue
- Coordinates: 53°17′46.81″N 6°19′32.78″W

Playing kits
Standard colours

Senior Club Championships
	All Ireland	Leinster champions	Dublin champions
Football:	0	0	1
Hurling:	1	8	31

Faughs GAA Club (Irish: CLG Fág an Bealach) is a Gaelic Athletic Association (GAA) hurling and camogie club in Templeogue, Dublin, Ireland. They have won 31 titles.

== History ==
Faughs GAA Club was founded in Easter 1885 in the Phoenix Park in Dublin. Its inaugural meeting was held at 4 Gardiner's Row, home of Michael Cusack. The club name, Faughs, is derived from the Irish language slogan, fág an bealach, anglicized as Faugh A Ballagh, meaning "clear the way".

When the Dublin County Board was formed in 1886, Larry O'Toole was on the committee. At this time the Faughs colours were amber and black, and the club played both hurling and football. The Faughs took part in the first Dublin championships in 1887, and were winners of the Dublin Senior Football Championship in 1889.

=== Merge with Davitts ===
In January 1891, Faughs merged with the "Davitts" who, like Faughs, were mostly "spirit grocers assistants". As the "Faughs–Davitts" they adopted a tri-colour amber, black and blue kit. They won their first Dublin senior hurling championship in 1892, and were beaten by Redmonds of Cork in the All-Ireland final in an unfinished match. The Faughs–Davitts coalition declined after this match.

=== Reorganisation, 1895-1920s ===
In 1895, a number of members of the original Faughs club revived and reorganised the club. After 1895, Faughs became a hurling-only club and adopted the colours of saffron and green, which it has kept to the present day.

In the early 20th century, the club won the first four senior championships (a four-in-a-row lasting from 1900 to 1904) and another five before 1920. Players during this period included Jack and Jimmy Cleary, Danny McCormack, Andy Harty, and Jack and Will Connolly. Harry Boland, known for his part in the 1916 Rising, War of Independence and Civil War, also played for Faughs on the 1914 and 1915 championship teams.

A four-in-a-row was achieved again in 1920–1923. In 1920, they won three titles: the Senior Championship and League, Intermediate Championship and League. The team was led by Bob Mockler and captured the All-Ireland Senior Hurling Championship title beating Cork in the final by six points. The final score was 4–9 to 4–3. Included in this team were Jim "Builder" Walsh, Tommy Moore, Mick Neville, Martin Hayes, Tom Hayes, Jimmy Cleary, Ned Tobin, Bob Doherty and John Joe Callanan, who would later captain Tipperary to beat Dublin in the 1930 All-Ireland final.

=== Mid- to late-20th century ===
From 1939 to 1952, Faughs won eight championships, including two threes-in-a-row in 1939–1941 and 1944–1946. These teams included a number of inter-county and inter-provincial players, including Ned Wade, Mick Butler, Terry Leahy, Mick Gill, Dan Canniffe, Dan Devitt, Jim Prior, Tony Herbert, Jack Sheedy and Tommy Boland.

Faughs' next senior championship success had to wait until 1970. They then won several championships in a row. They beat St. Vincents in Croke Park to win the 1970 title. In May 1971, after a gruelling game, they were beaten by one point by Buffers Alley in the Leinster Senior Club Hurling Championship. A few days later, they were knocked out of the Dublin championship, again by a single point margin by Craobh Ciaran who went on to win their first Dublin title.

Faughs won the next two county championships of 1972 and 1973 and reached the final in 1974, which they lost to Kilmacud Crokes by one point. Two senior titles came in the 1980s—1986 and 1987. Two more came in the 1990s, 1992 and 1999, to bring the total of senior championship titles to 31.

== Grounds ==
From their foundation in 1885 up to 1949, Faughs trained in the Phoenix Park in the Fifteen Acres, Nine Acres, Polo Ground and beside the Hurling Ground or Army Ground, except for a short period in the winter of 1942–1943 when they moved to Dolphin Park. From 1949 to 1958, they leased a ground in St. Anne's Estate in Killester, where they erected their own dressing rooms.

Following serious vandalism of these, they moved back to the Phoenix Park to the original Fifteen Acres of the 1885 period. In 1972, training moved to Terenure College. Then, in 1981, they moved to the ground at Tymon North, Templeogue.

In the early days, club meetings took place at various venues, including Pat Cullen's premises at 27 Upper Ormond Quay, where Dublin County Board and Leinster Council meetings were also held. Later, and for many years, Tommy Moore's premises in Cathedral Street was the home of Faughs.

From the early 1960s, Stephen Bourke's premises at 25 Wexford Street became the new home of Faughs. It was here that the plans were laid to build the clubhouse at Tymon North, Templeogue, which was officially opened by Dr. Patrick Hillery, President of Ireland on 30 November 1986.

== Notable players ==
- Harry Boland, who was prominent in the 1916 Rising and War of Independence, won senior championships with Faughs in 1914 and 1915. He was chairman of Dublin County Board from 1911 to 1916.
- Tommy Moore was Faughs club chairman for 50 years. The Irish club hurling championship cup is named in his honour. The original cup can be seen in the Croke Park museum.
- Pat Farrell, hurling correspondent under the pen-name "P.F." for several decades with the Evening Herald, was chairman of the Dublin Junior Board in 1934–1935, and was also a senior hurling selector for many years.

Faughs Dublin teams won eight Leinster Championships. Bob Mockler captained Faughs to win the 1920 All-Ireland for Dublin. Dublin's All-Ireland win in 1938 included Faughs players Mick Butler, Phil Farrell, Mick Gill, Harry Grey and Charlie Downs. Jim Prior captained Dublin in the 1952 All-Ireland while Mick Kennedy, who got the first score on RTÉ, represented Faughs in Dublin's last All-Ireland final appearance in 1961.

== Roll of honour ==
- All-Ireland Senior Hurling Championship: Winner 1920
- Leinster Senior Hurling Championship: 1892, 1902, 1906, 1920, 1921
- Dublin Senior Hurling Championship Winners: 1892, 1900, 1901, 1903, 1904, 1906, 1910, 1911, 1914, 1915, 1920, 1921, 1922, 1923, 1930, 1936, 1939, 1940, 1941, 1944, 1945, 1946, 1950, 1952, 1970, 1972, 1973, 1986, 1987, 1992, 1999
- Dublin Senior Hurling League: 1904, 1906, 1910, 1911, 1914, 1915, 1920, 1921, 1922, 1925, 1927, 1930, 1937, 1938, 1939, 1942, 1944, 1946, 1948, 1952, 1953, 1961, 1962, 1966, 1971, 1973, 1986, 1987
- Dublin Senior B Hurling Championship: 2001, 2005, 2018
- Dublin Minor B Hurling Championship Winners 2012, 2016
- Dublin Minor C Hurling Championship Winners 2004, 2008
- Dublin Senior Football Championship Winners: 1889
- Dublin Intermediate Hurling Championship Winners: 1920, 1930, 1987
- Dublin Junior Hurling Championship Winners: 1898, 1944, 1947, 1984, 1999, 2007
- Dublin Junior C Hurling Championship Winners 2000, 2012
- Dublin Feile Championship Camogie Division 1 Winners: 2024
