= Donnycarney =

Suburb of Dublin, Ireland

Donnycarney Domhnach Cearna (Irish)
- Suburb
- Location in Ireland
- Coordinates: 53°22′33.6″N 6°13′7.68″W
- Country: Ireland
- Province: Leinster
- County: Dublin
- Local government area: Dublin City Council
- Time zone: UTC+0 (WET)
  - Summer (DST): UTC-1 (IST (WEST))
- Eircode routing key: D05

Donnycarney (Irish: Domhnach Cearna) is a suburb of Dublin, Ireland, in the jurisdiction of Dublin City Council. It is mostly residential, around 5 kilometres (3.1 mi) from the centre of Dublin. Dublin GAA's home stadium, Parnell Park, is located here.

== Location ==
Donnycarney is a mostly residential area, 5 kilometres (3.1 mi) from the centre of Dublin. It is bordered by the suburbs of Artane, Beaumont, Killester and Marino, and lies in the postal districts of Dublin 3, 5 and 9. It is in the Clontarf West Electoral Division 1901, in the Civil Parish of Clonturk, in the Barony of Coolock.

=== Rivers ===
An underground river, the Wad, crosses Donnycarney, while the Naniken River crosses the Malahide Road at the edge of Donnycarney, towards Coolock.

== History ==
The foundational story of Donnycarney is that St Patrick founded the church there. A holy woman, Gentle Segnat, "the virgin of Domhnach Cerine" was believed to have resided in Donnycarney during the early Christian period with a feast day celebrated on 18 December. During the Battle of Clontarf, some fighting took place in the area of Donnycarney and Marino known as the "Bloody Fields".

The lands of Donnycarney were historically owned by the Priory of All Hallows, and after the dissolution of the monasteries, Henry VIII gave the lands to the city of Dublin; at that time, they encompassed the area now known as Marino. Dublin Corporation allowed the incumbent tenant, Christopher Hetherington, to continue his lease, on the proviso that he supply "good and sufficient brawn" to the Mayor of Dublin each Christmas, and maintain the land. After the English Civil War, the Hetherington family lost their lands and their house, which was probably located somewhere in the Marino area.

Colonel Michael Jones, the governor of Dublin, was given the lands in 1648 at a nominal rent. William Basil, Attorney-General for Ireland, leased the lands during the Cromwellian period and retained the lands after the Restoration. John Perceval, 1st Earl of Egmont, succeeded the Basil family in holding the lands, and when he lived there his friend, the philosopher George Berkeley, would visit him. Berkeley described the walk from Trinity College as lonely but said that Donnycarney was beautiful.

The lands were then leased by a number of gentlemen in quick succession, until Thomas Adderley took possession. He built Marino House for his stepson, James Caulfeild, 1st Earl of Charlemont in the southeastern end of Donnycarney which is now called Marino. Caulfield went on to build the Casino at Marino.

The lands reverted to Dublin Corporation after the Caulfields left Marino House, allowing for the construction of the Marino housing scheme, and further Corporation housing schemes in modern-day Donnycarney.

== Development ==
The Dublin Street Directory of 1873 lists the following houses in Donnycarney at the time: Donnycarney Cottage, Laurel Hill, Elm Mount, Kavanagh's Grocery, "The Refuge" (public house), Ganeville, Mount Temple and St. John's.

The area is divided by Malahide Road into two separate parts: Donnycarney West (Old Donnycarney, built in the 1930s) and North Donnycarney (New Donnycarney, built in the 1940s). Donnycarney is predominantly residential, as a result of developments during the 20th century when Dublin Corporation made housing schemes for the suburban areas of the Northside of Dublin. Previously, areas such as Donnycarney were farmland with just one village street.

=== Old Donnycarney ===
Four hundred cottages were planned by Dublin corporation in Donnycarney for tenant purchase, favouring private middle-class housing. Government housing policies were not in favour of the working class at the time. No slum clearance schemes were tackled until the 1930s, which in turn led to corporation housing being built. It was not until the 1930s that Dublin Corporation developed these houses.

The area called Old Donnycarney are these few hundred houses built in the townland in 1931 and 1932. They are situated to the left side of the Malahide Road, perpendicular to Collins Avenue. These roads and streets are named after trees: Hazel, Holly, Oak and Elm. An exception is Belton Park, where the houses were privately built in the 1930s by the Belton family. These houses are slightly larger than those built by the corporation. The former taoiseach (prime minister) Charles Haughey was raised on Belton Park Road.

=== New Donnycarney ===
This consists of around 800 houses, built between 1947 and 1949. Its streets are known as "the clans" because their names are preceded by "Clan", Irish for "family". The later Donnycarney housing scheme was completed in 1949 where it was built on the lands of 'Victoria Park' which was mostly grazing land.

Most of this new Donnycarney housing is opposite Parnell Park as opposed to the old housing that stretches the length of Collins Avenue, towards Whitehall. Our Lady of Consolation National School and Scoil Chiarain Boys School are on Collins Avenue East in New Donnycarney.

== Amenities ==
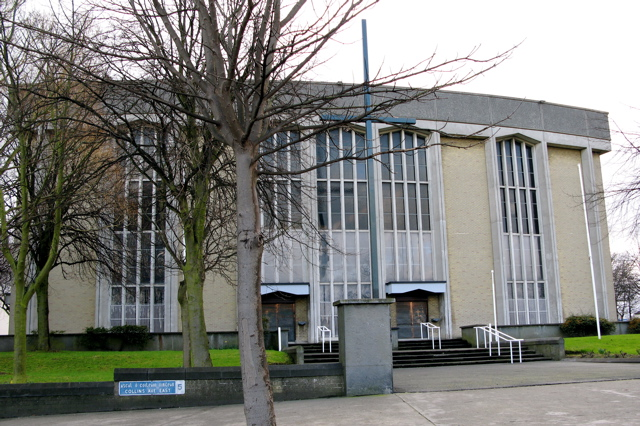
Our Lady of Consolation Roman Catholic church, Donnycarney.

There are restaurants, the Donnycarney/Beaumont Credit Union, a church, a community youth project in the newly-built community centre, (Le Chéile), fish and chip shops, Chinese takeaways, newsagents, and pubs. There are small strips of shops along Collins Avenue West, Malahide Road and Killester Avenue. Killester Village and Artane Castle Shopping Centre are also nearby.

=== Schools ===
There are two primary schools on Collins Avenue West: Our Lady of Consolation National School for girls and Scoil Chiaráin for boys. The secondary schools St. David's College in Artane, and St. Mary's Holy Faith Killester for girls, are just outside Donnycarney.

== Governance ==
Donnycarney is part of the Dáil Éireann constituency of Dublin Bay North, whose five elected representatives are Tom Brabazon of Fianna Fáil, elected in 2024; Barry Heneghan, an Independent, elected in 2024; Cian O'Callaghan of Social Democrats, elected in 2020; Naoise Ó Muirí of Fine Gael, elected in 2024 and Denise Mitchell of Sinn Féin, elected in 2016. Charles Haughey was a teachta dála (member of parliament) for the area for 35 years; he also became taoiseach (prime minister). His son Seán Haughey also held a seat from 1992 to 2011, and again from 2016 to 2024.

== Religion ==
Donnycarney is a Catholic parish in the Fingal South East deanery of the Archdiocese of Dublin, served by Our Lady of Consolation Church, one of the largest churches in Dublin which was built in 1969, replacing the old tin church to cater for the growing local population.

== Sport ==
A 3.25 hectares (8.0 acres) local park, Maypark, has a playground, an all-weather pitch, as well as Gaelic games (GAA) and association football pitches.

Parnell Park is the Dublin GAA home stadium where the Dublin inter-county teams play many of their matches, including lower-profile matches which do not warrant the use of the national stadium, Croke Park.

The local GAA clubs are Craobh Chiaráin and St Vincents. There are also association football teams.

The Clontarf Golf Club, crossed by the Wad River, is on Malahide Road.

== Transport ==
=== Bus ===
The area is served by Dublin Bus routes 14, 15, 27, 27a, 27b, 42 and 43, which all stop at the centre of Donnycarney – the Donnycarney Church bus stops.

Go-Ahead Ireland Route 104 from Dublin City University to Clontarf also serves Collins Avenue East.

Transport for Ireland (TFI) bus route N4 serves a night-link service from Blanchardstown to Point Village, travelling down Collins Avenue, while connecting both sides of Donnycarney.

=== Train ===
The Killester Dart urban rail station is also nearby, at the beginning of Collins Avenue.

== Notable people ==
- The English-born judge Henry Draycott bought the manor of Donnycarney during the reign of Elizabeth I
- Tommy Eglington, a former association footballer who played for Shamrock Rovers, Everton, Tranmere Rovers, and the Irish national football team, was from Donnycarney.
- Atkins Hamerton, British consul in Zanzibar from 1841 to 1857, was born in Donnycarney in 1804.
- Politician Charles Haughey grew up on Belton Park Road.
- Dublin hurler and all-star winner Alan McCrabbe lives in Casino Park.
- Musician Barney McKenna of The Dubliners was born in Donnycarney.
- Musician Paddy Moloney of The Chieftains was from Donnycarney.
- The musician Leo Rowsome (King of Pipers), a founding member of Comhaltas Ceoltóirí Éireann and also one of the founders of Na Píobairí Uilleann, lived and worked in Donnycarney.
