= Balthasar van den Bossche =

Flemish painter (1681–1715)

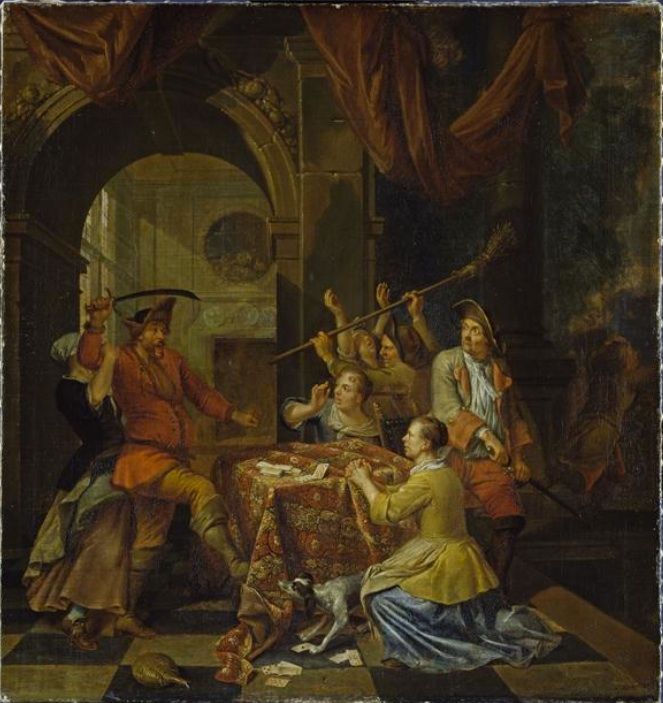
Fight over a card game

Balthasar van den Bossche (1681–1715) was a Flemish painter who is mainly known for his wide range of genre subjects and occasional portraits.

== Life ==
Balthasar van den Bossche was born in Antwerp where he studied under the Flemish genre painter Gerard Thomas, an artist who specialized in paintings of studio and picture gallery interiors. Van den Bossche became a master of the Antwerp Guild in 1697. He then travelled to France and maintained a studio in Paris for some time.

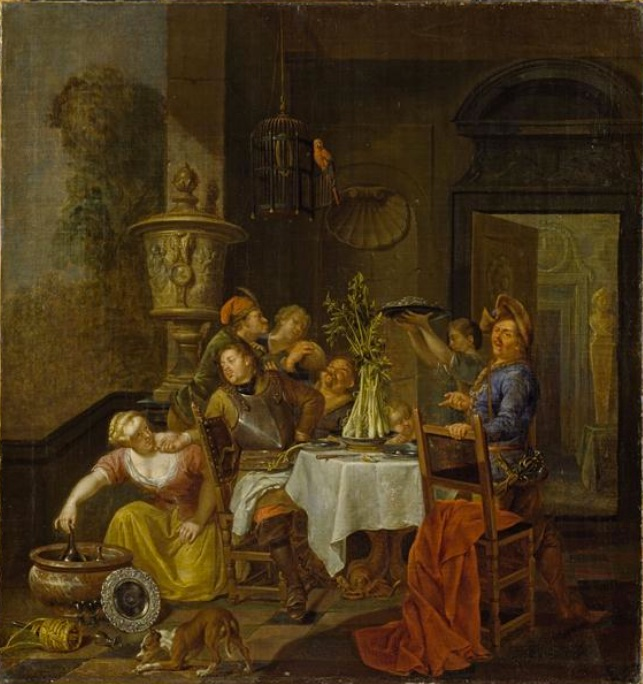
Merry company

He had returned to Antwerp by 1700 and worked for an art dealer. At the same time he continued to paint with notable success. He had important patrons such as the Duke of Marlborough who visited Antwerp after the Battle of Ramillies in 1706. The Duke of Marlborough was so impressed by van den Bossche’s works that he commissioned him to paint a portrait of the Duke including the scene of a battle. Van den Bossche painted the portrait in collaboration with Pieter van Bloemen, a well-known painter of animals, in particular horses.

In 1774 Sir Joshua Reynolds referred to van den Bossche when writing about the French painter Antoine Coypel (1661–1722): 'The modern affectation of grace in his works, as well as in those of Bosch (sic) and Watteau, may be said to be separated by a very thin partition from the more simple and pure grace of Correggio and Parmegiano'.

The artist's successful career was cut short by his death in Antwerp in 1715. The portrait and genre painter Jan Carel Vierpeyl was one of his pupils.

== Work ==
=== General ===
While van den Bossche’s works include the occasional individual and group portrait, the bulk of his output explored the various genre subjects that had been introduced in Flemish and Dutch painting in the 17th century. The preferred subjects of his genre paintings were picture galleries and artist studios, which were also the preferred themes of his master Gerard Thomas. He also painted alchemists in their laboratories, guardroom scenes, conversation pieces, merry companies and doctor visits.

His teacher's style was evident in van den Bossche’s work. He shared the same preference for depicting luxurious bourgeois rooms and conversation pieces, that showcased his patrons' social superiority. These interiors were adorned with the symbols of genteel politeness, artistic discernment, fashion and wealth to highlight that his sitters possessed material wealth as well as social graces.

Like other Flemish artists of his time, van den Bosche was mindful of the prevailing preference in the market for French and Parisian art and adapted his Flemish style to conform to Paris tastes.

As was customary in Antwerp, van den Bossche collaborated with other specialist painters. His collaborations with Pieter van Bloemen (an animal specialist) and Jacob Balthasar Peeters (an architectural painter) are documented.

=== Artist studios and picture galleries ===
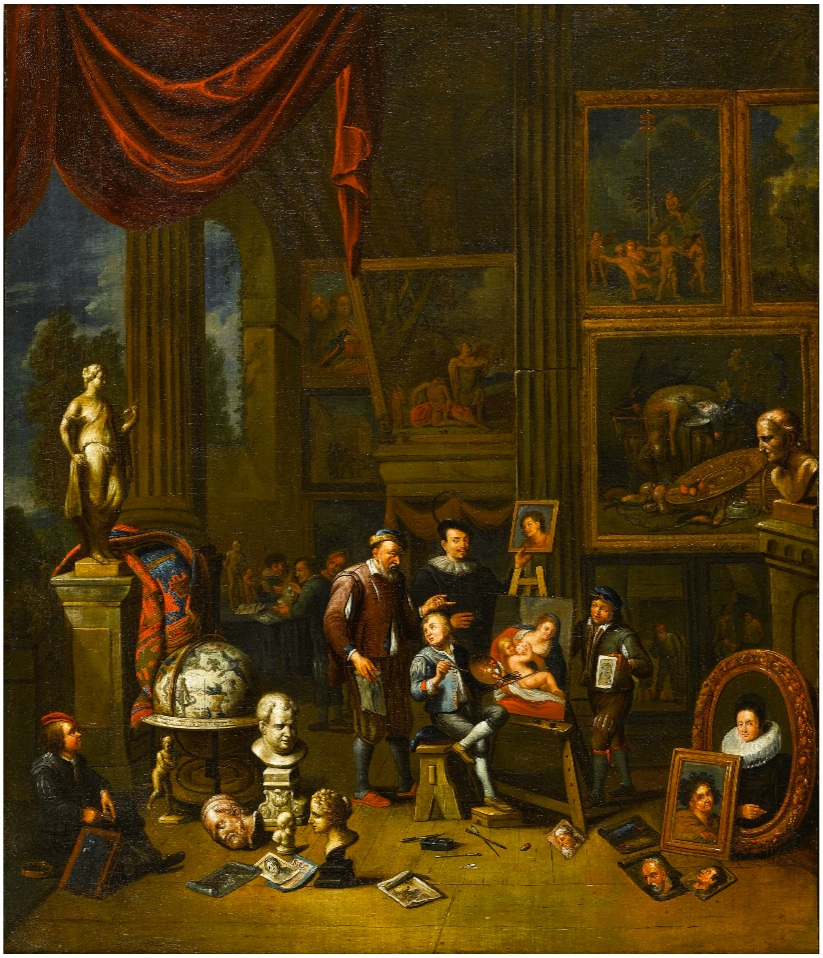
Artist's studio

Van den Bossche gained a reputation with his representations of artist studio interiors and art collector galleries. He often painted pendant works with one of the pair of paintings representing an artist studio and the other the patron in his home with his collection.

The genre of the 'gallery paintings' is native to Antwerp where Frans Francken the Younger and Jan Brueghel the Elder were the first artists to create paintings of art and curiosity collections in the 1620s. Gallery paintings depict large rooms in which many paintings and other precious items are displayed in elegant surroundings usually with the owner present. The earliest works in this genre depicted art objects together with other items such as scientific instruments or peculiar natural specimens. The genre became immediately quite popular and was followed by other artists such as Jan Brueghel the Younger, Cornelis de Baellieur, Hans Jordaens, David Teniers the Younger, Gillis van Tilborch and Hieronymus Janssens. The art galleries depicted were either real galleries or imaginary galleries, sometimes with allegorical figures. The later development of the genre to which van den Bossche contributed depicted the figures in the gallery paintings in a manner which emphasised that they formed part of an elite with privileged knowledge of art. His gallery paintings thus were a medium to accentuate the notion that the powers of discernment associated with connoisseurship are socially superior to or more desirable than other forms of knowledge.

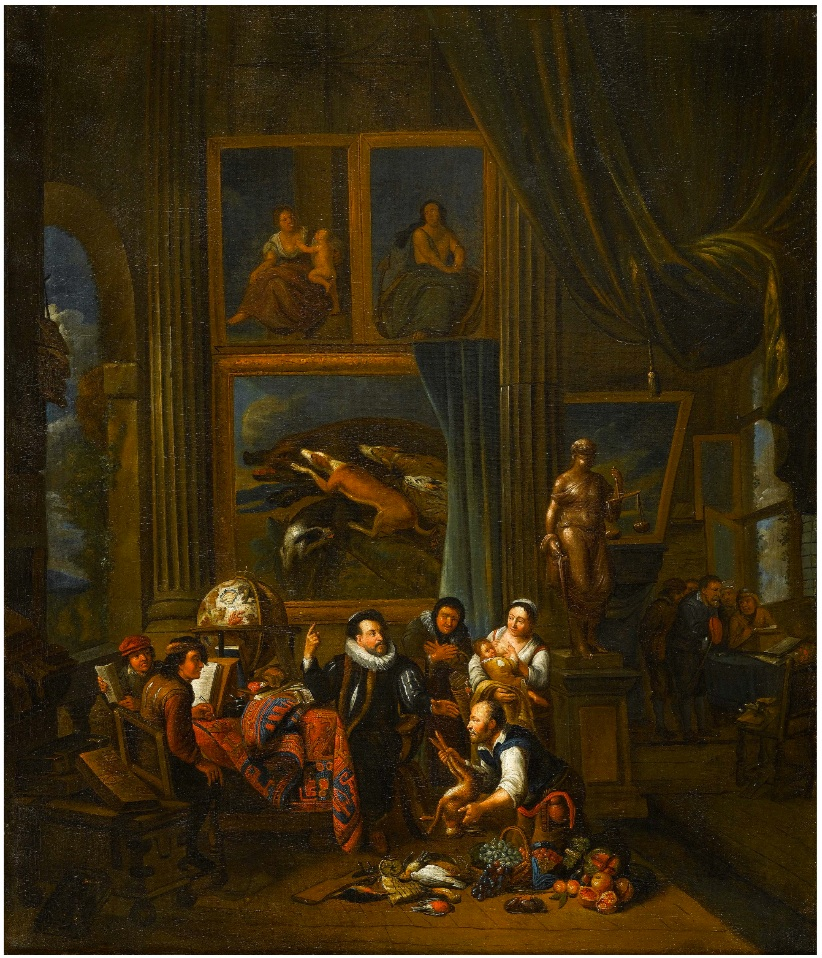
A nobleman’s picture gallery

The artist studio genre developed in the 15th century when artists started representing themselves in elevated historical guises, either as the Evangelist Luke painting Mary and the Infant Jesus or as famous painters from antiquity such as Apelles, painter to Alexander the Great. Seventeenth-century Dutch painters inverted the traditions of the two preceding centuries by rejecting historical guises and idealised settings and substituting more direct, true-to-life images of the painter at work. Some artists such as Adriaen van Ostade created images of very dilapidated studios, as if a painter of peasant scenes like himself should be a peasant in real life. Others such as Gerrit Dou refined the genre by turning them into erudite allegories of the arts. However, the genre was never intended to provide a realistic representation of an artist studio, but was rather a representation and promotion of a particular view of the role or status of artists. The artist studios are usually depicted with the props used by artists in the creation of their work. Van den Bossche often reused the same props in various treatments of artist studios. For instance the heavy drape and globe in An Artist's Studio (sold at Sphinx Fine Art) reappear in the Studio of an Artist held by the Hermitage. Van den Bossche included in these works a window opening to a leafy Italianate view. As in all 17th-century artist studio portraits, the light in these studio and gallery scenes comes from the north and from side windows rather than roof panels.

=== Physicians and alchemists ===
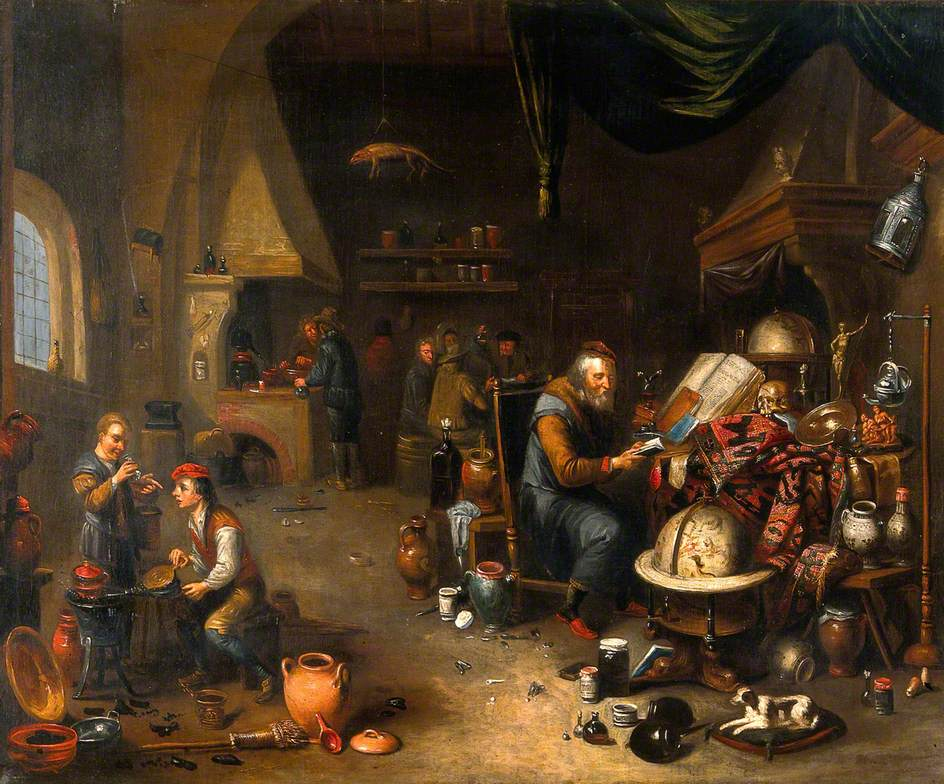
An alchemist in his laboratory

The theme of physicians and alchemists was popular in 17th century Flemish and Dutch genre painting. David Teniers the Younger was the principal contributor to this genre and its iconography in Flanders. The view of the public towards practitioners of either craft was ambivalent and physicians and alchemists were regarded either as persons seriously committed to the pursuit of knowledge or as charlatans and quacks using deception to seek material gain. The ambivalence of this attitude was reflected in the artistic representations of physicians and alchemists.

While alchemists were mainly concerned with transmutation of base metals into more noble ones, their endeavors were wider and also involved the use of their techniques to diagnose or cure people (the so-called 'iatrochemistry', which aimed to provide chemical solutions to diseases and medical ailments). There was therefore an overlap with the role of physicians. One of the popular methods of medical diagnosis was the so-called 'uroscopy', the analysis of the urine of a patient. Whereas this was considered a valid diagnostic method in the Middle Ages its validity had come under attack by more modern-minded physicians in the 17th century. The practice of uroscopy and the questions surrounding its use by medical practitioners were the impetus for genre paintings on the theme of the 'piskijker' ('pee looker'). They typically showed the inspection by a physician or a quack of a flask of urine provided by a young woman. If the inspection revealed the image of a fetus this was proof that the woman was pregnant.

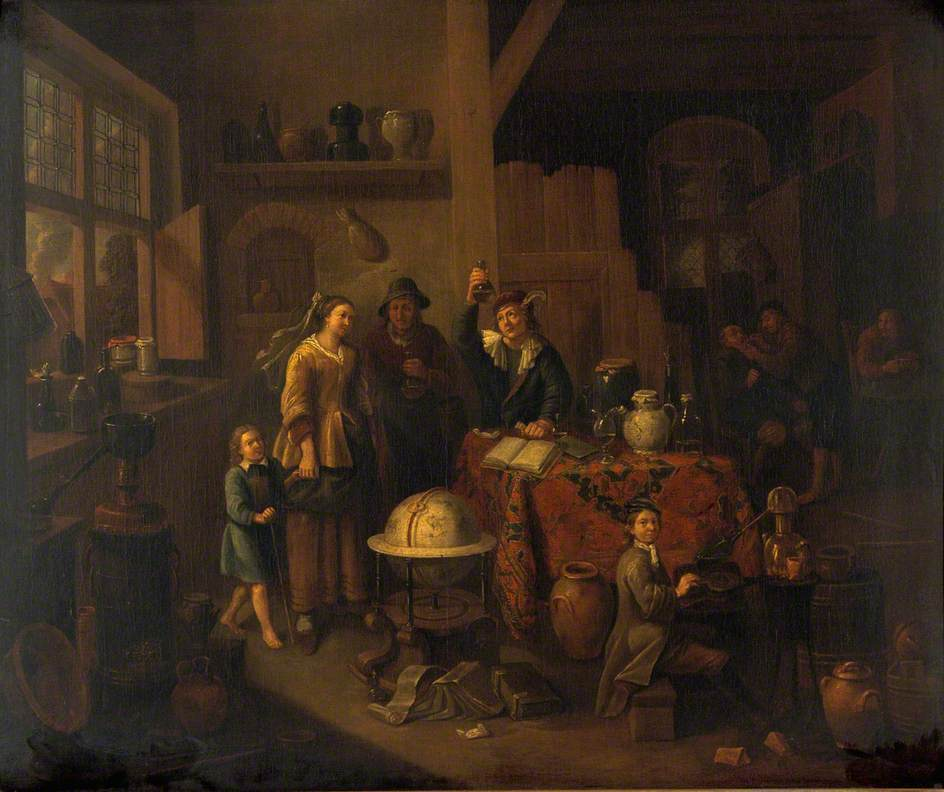
A man examining a urine flask

An example of van den Bossche's contribution to the genre is the composition A man examining a urine flask which shows a man examining a urine flask for the purpose of medical diagnosis. He is surrounded by alchemical and scholarly apparatus and books. A mother, daughter and child are consulting him. A possible interpretation of the scene is that they are trying to find out whether the daughter is pregnant. Another scene with a similar subject called The iatrochemist (Chemical Heritage Foundation) shows a man (the iatrochemist) holding up for inspection a urinal that was brought to him by a servant. The iatrochemist is consulting at the same time a manual. The room contains a number of alchemist tools but is clearly not intended as a realist representation of an alchemist's or physician’s work area. This is clear from the fact that many of the motifs in the scene are borrowed from Teniers or from other works of van den Bossche himself such as the globe and the Turkish carpet which he also used in some of his art studio scenes. The depictions of van den Bossche of the theme of the uroscopy do not appear to criticise the iatrochemist but rather show him as a person to whom the patients come in the confidence that he is a man of knowledge.

=== Guardroom scenes ===
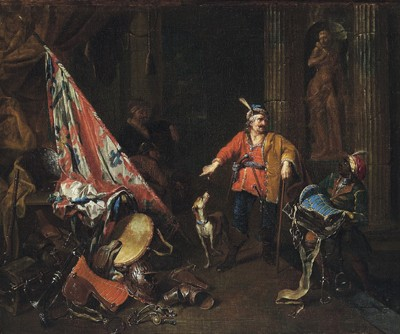
Guardroom scene

Balthasar van den Bossche also painted a number of guardroom scenes. A guardroom scene typically depicts an interior with officers and soldiers engaged in merrymaking. Guardroom scenes often included mercenaries and prostitutes dividing booty, harassing captives or indulging in other forms of reprehensible activities.

Van den Bossche's guardroom scenes did not include the rowdy scenes more common in the 17th century but depicted more intimate settings of officers with their servants. An example of a guardroom scene by van den Bossche is the Guardroom scene (Sold at Dorotheum on 14 April 2005, Vienna, lot 116), which shows an Oriental looking officer who is instructing an African servant to add a saddle to a pile of weapons, a drum, parts of armour and a war standard in the foreground of the picture. The armour depicted in the picture was already out of date at the time it was painted since metal armours, breast plates and helmets fell out of use from the 1620s. It is possible that in line with the moralizing intent of the genre, the armour is a reference to the vanitas motif of the transience of power and fame.
