= Marino House =

Georgian house in Dublin, Ireland (1755 to 1920s)

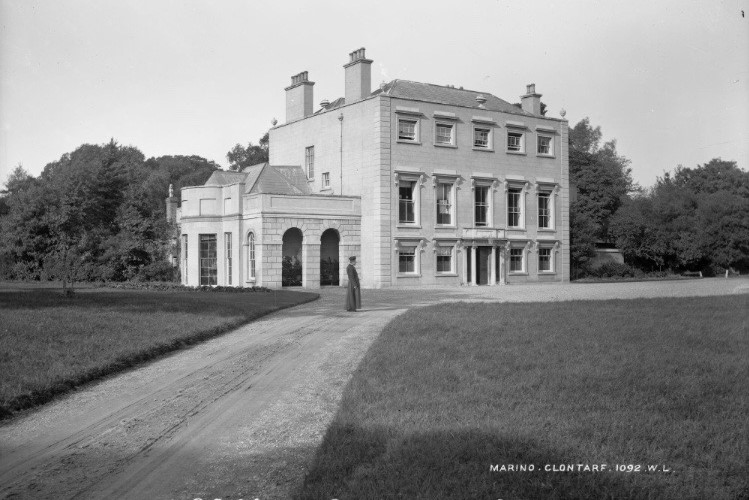
- Interactive map of the Marino House area

General information
- Status: Private dwelling house
- Type: House
- Architectural style: Georgian
- Location: Marino, Dublin, Ireland
- Coordinates: 53.367343°N 6.230090°W
- Estimated completion: 1755
- Demolished: 1920
- Owner: Office of Public Works

Technical details
- Floor count: 3

Design and construction
- Architects: Sir William Chambers (alterations to main house), James Gandon (funerary urns and assorted statuary)
- Developer: The 1st Earl of Charlemont

Marino House was a Georgian house and estate in Marino in the northern suburbs of Dublin, Ireland, constructed sometime around 1755 and later remodelled by Sir William Chambers for the 1st Earl of Charlemont. Chambers later also designed Charlemont House on nearby Rutland Square (now Parnell Square) for Lord Charlemont as well as a summer house within the grounds of Marino House, now known as the Casino at Marino.

The house, which was demolished in the 1920s, was named for Marino in modern day Italy, which the Earl visited on his grand tour of Europe. The later suburb of Marino took its name from the house and estate.

== History ==
The house was designed and constructed following Lord Charlemont's return from his Grand Tour of Italy, Greece, Turkey, Egypt and France which lasted from around 1746-55. The house replaced an earlier Donnycarney House on the site which was acquired by a Thomas Adderley, the step-father of the Earl of Charlemont following his mother's second marriage. A later Donnycarney house was built nearby in 1781 by Thomas Carroll and now forms Clontarf Golf club house.

The grounds of the house included the more famous folly, the Casino at Marino, constructed slightly later from 1755 onwards and completed around 1775.

The Christian Brothers bought Marino House in 1881 and moved their main Dublin base there from nearby Belvidere House in Drumcondra. Later, the Christian Brothers moved to the newly constructed St Mary's building from 1904. An image of the house around this stage in 1911 appears in The Georgian Society records. The house was demolished circa 1920 and the funerary urns from the roof of the House which were designed by James Gandon were transferred to the roof of St. Mary's.

In 1915, Dublin Corporation acquired much of the house and grounds in the surrounding area for the development of social housing and a new garden suburb; however, the outbreak of the First World War delayed the commencement of construction until 1924. Today the site of the house is roughly the location of Brian Road in Marino.

=== Other structures ===
Various follies and pieces of classical and neoclassical artwork were scattered throughout the house and grounds. The house itself was said to have included an Egyptian Room.

Most notable among these was the Casino at Marino which is the only one still standing today and is a national monument.

Other follies includes a Gothic Room or temple sometimes referred to as Rosamond's Bower, with stained glass windows and fretted mouldings, constructed at the same time as the casino, as well as the Gothic seat and the Hermitage.

The original Georgian entrance gate pillars (1770) designed by Sir William Chambers and Giovanni Battista Cipriani were relocated to Griffith Avenue and are still in existence today.

Croydon Park House was also located close to Marino House on the site of present day Croydon Park Avenue. The house was demolished in 1926 and social housing was built on the site. The house was the home of Charles Lucas, a friend and physician to Lord Charlemont. It has also been mentioned by Mary Delany of nearby Delville House in her letters as owned by a Mrs Donnellan.

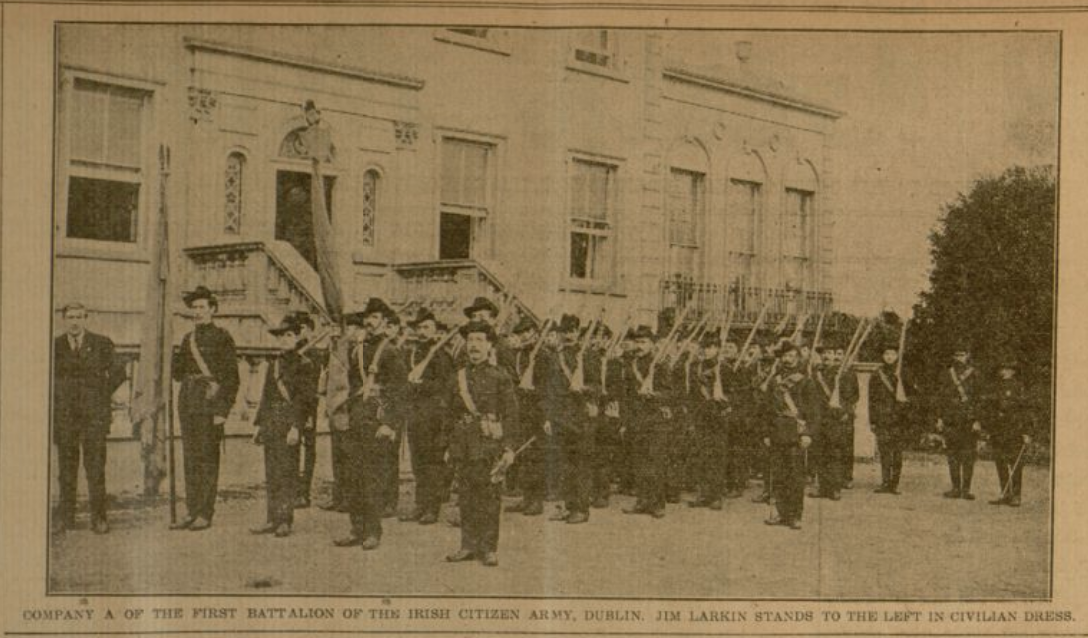
James Larkin with the Irish Citizen Army outside of Croydon Park House in Marino in 1914.
