= Simon Vierpyl =

English sculptor

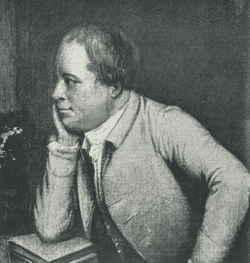
- Vierpyl as featured in a painting by John Trotter for the Blue Coat School, Dublin
- Born: c. 1725; London, England
- Died: 16 February 1810 (aged 84–85)
- Spouse(s): Frances Dickson, Mary Burrows
- Children: Charles Vierpyl
- Family: Jan Carel Vierpeyl

Simon Vierpyl (c. 1725 – 16 February 1810) was an English builder, sculptor and stone carver.

== Life ==
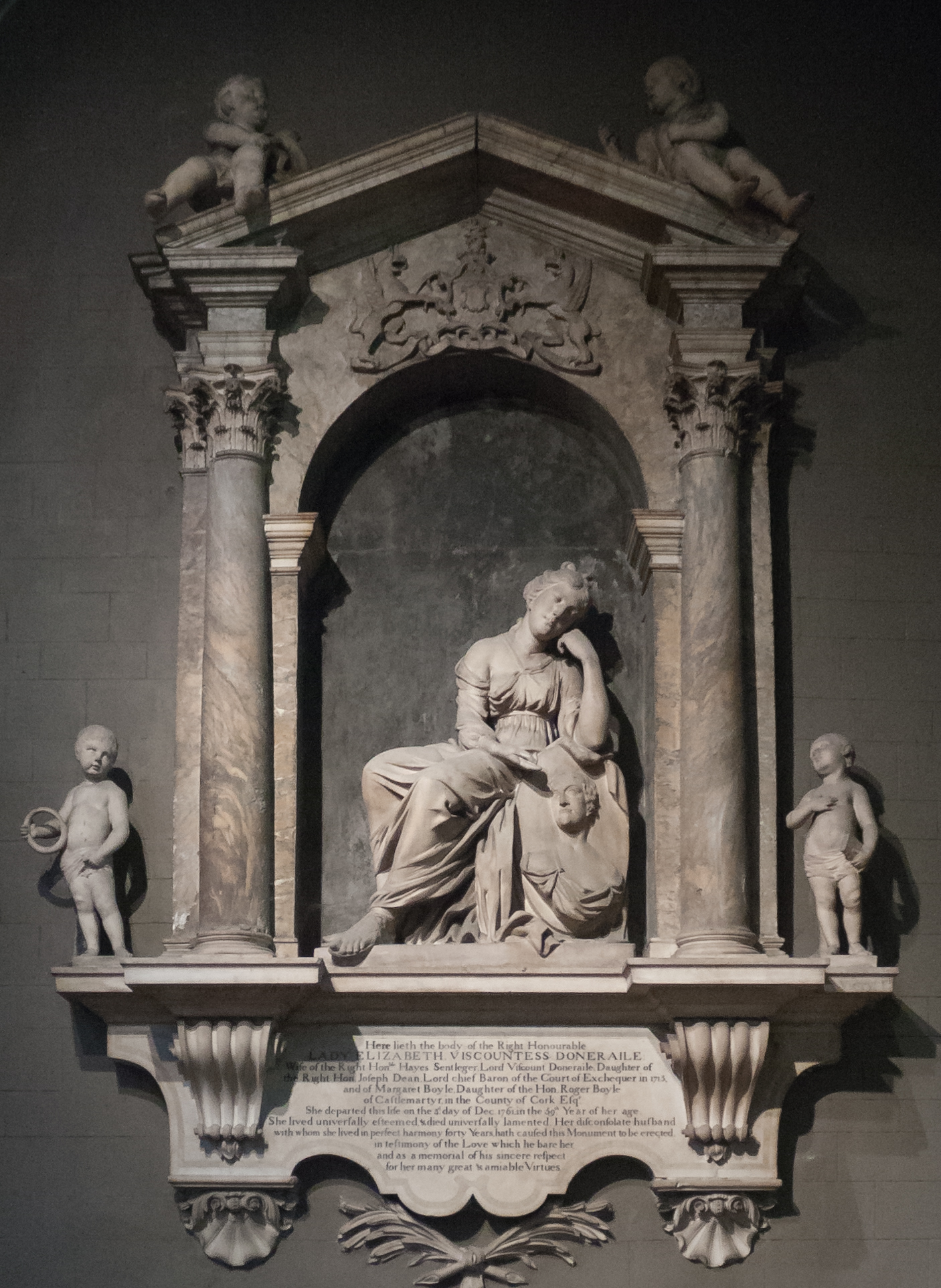
St. Patrick's Cathedral South Transept West Aisle Monument Dedicated to Lady Doneraile by Vierpyl

Simon Vierpyl was born in London, around 1725. His parents were Dutch. He studied sculpture under Peter and Henry Scheemakers. It is unclear if the artist, Jan Carel Vierpeyl, was related to Vierpyl, possibly being his father.

Vierpyl was in Rome went to Rome from 1748 for nine years, when he met James Caulfeild, 1st Earl of Charlemont, who was on his grand tour. Charlemont commissioned him to make copies from the private collections and public galleries of Rome. For Charlemont's travel companion, Rev. Edward Murphy, Vierpyl modelled 22 statues and 78 busts of Roman emperors out of terracotta, which were shipped to Ireland after their completion in 1755. Murphy left the busts to Charlemont after his death in 1777, and were displayed in the James Gandon designed Rockingham library of Charlemont House until the 3rd Earl of Charlemont presented them to the Royal Irish Academy in 1868.

Vierpyl came to Dublin in 1756, when Charlemont asked him to supervise the building of the Casino at Marino, taking up residence on Marlborough Street, and later Henry Street. Vierpyl carved ornamental details for the building out of Portland stone with his pupil, Edward Smyth. These include the four statues of the deities Ceres, Bacchus, Apollo and Venus. He also worked on chambers for Charlemont's townhouse, now the Hugh Lane Gallery. Vierpyl supervised improvements to Castletown House for Lady Louisa Conolly, constructing the large cantilevered stairs with Alexander King.

He is depicted in a painting by John Trotter from 1779, where Vierpyl is shown speaking with Thomas Ivory, the architect of the Blue Coat School. Vierpyl lived on Bachelor's Walk (then number 41) in 1779, with the adjoining property being used as his stone-cutting yard. He also carved 3 marble busts for The Old Library, Trinity College Dublin, including of Claudius Gilbert, and that is now on display in the Old Library. With the carver, Richard Cranfield, Vierpyl built a number of small houses around the city as well as the City Assembly House, a dedicated exhibition space for the Society of Artists in Ireland.

Vierpyl married Frances Dickson at St Andrew's Church, Dublin on 26 December 1758. Frances was described as an "attractive, good-natured, and wealthy woman", and was the niece of the Rev. Dr Henry of Kildare Street. They had two sons, William and Charles, who both became stone carvers, and a daughter, Sophia. Frances died having thrown herself from the top window of their house on Bachelor's Walk.

Vierpyl remarried on 30 August 1779, to Mary Burrows. Following his retirement, Vierpyl moved to Athy, County Kildare, where he died on 16 February 1810.

His son Charles Vierpyl also became a notable architect designing the County Hall in Kilkenny.

== Notable works ==
- Royal Exchange (1769), latterly City Hall with Thomas Cooley
- Blue Coat School in Oxmantown (1773)
- Simpson's Hospital (1786), now demolished
- Casino at Marino
