= Jan Carel Vierpeyl =

Flemish painter

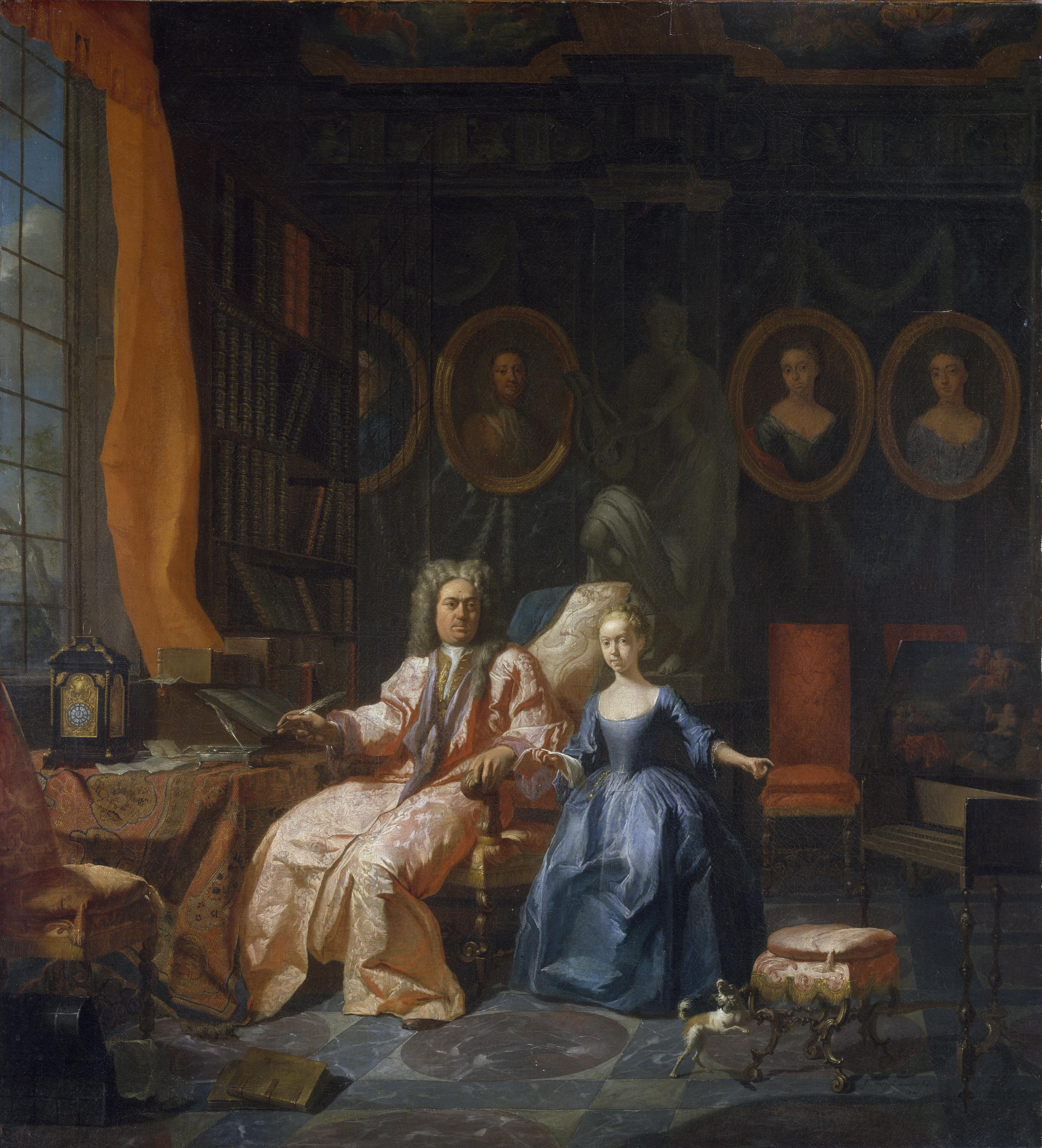
- Born: c. 1675
- Died: in or around 1723
- Occupation: Painter
- Family: Simon Vierpyl

Jan Carel Vierpeyl or Jan Carel Vierpyl (c. 1675 – in or after 1723) was a Flemish painter known mainly for his family portraits and genre scenes of merry and gallant companies.

== Life ==
Details about the life of Vierpeyl are very scarce. He was enrolled in 1698 at the Antwerp Guild of Saint Luke as a pupil of Jacob Balthasar Peeters. It has been deduced from this date that Vierpeyl was likely born somewhere between 1665 and 1685. Jacob Balthasar Peeters was an architectural painter. Balthasar van den Bossche is mentioned as another master of Vierpeyl.

The artist was active in Antwerp between 1697 and 1717 and his last known dated work is dated 1723. In 1616–1617, Josep Verduren is registered in the register of the Antwerp Guild of Saint Luke as pupil of Vierpeyl.

It is not clear whether he was related to, or even the father of, the sculptor and architect Simon Vierpyl, who is presumed to have been born in 1725 in London, where he trained with the Flemish sculptor Peter Scheemakers. A painting by Jan Carel Vierpeyl dated 1721 in the collection of the National Gallery of Ireland, which was believed in the past to depict the philosopher Francis Hutcheson and his daughter, may point to a stay in Great Britain by Jan Carel Vierpeyl. After 1723, all trace of the artist is lost.

== Work ==
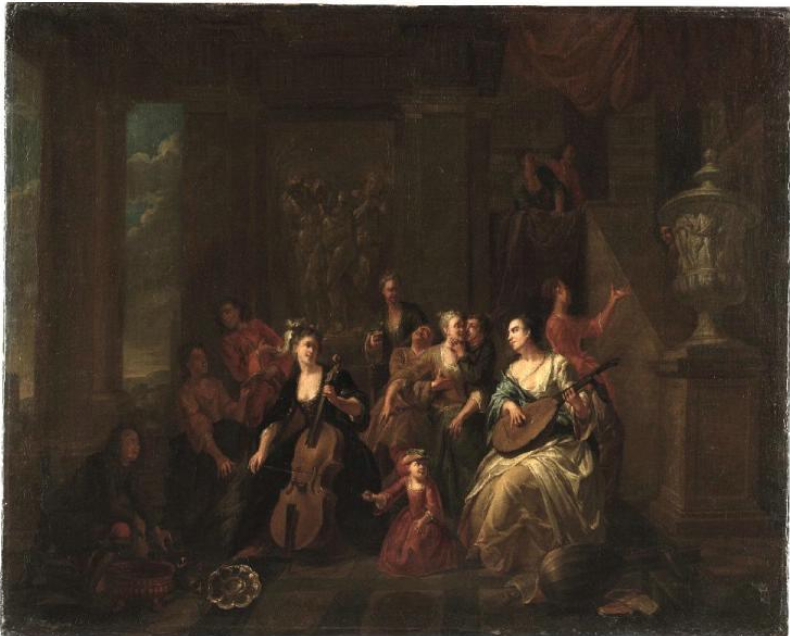
The concert

While some 19th century art historians mention history and vanitas paintings by Vierpeyl, the currently known work of Vierpeyl consists mainly of individual and family portraits and genre scenes.

The family portraits typically depict the larger or smaller family together with the family dog in a formal indoor setting. The ancestors of the sitters are also included through their portraits that are hung on the back wall. The Portrait of a Man and his Daughter dated 1721(National Gallery of Ireland) depicts a seated man with a quill in his hand. His standing teenage daughter is holding a book and is pointing to a harpsichord in the room. The lid of the harpsichord is open and the painting on the inside of the lid is in the Flemish and French tradition. The wall behind the sitters is covered with ancestor portraits in oval frames.

The genre works of Vierpeyl are in the style of merry companies and typically depict a group of men and woman engaged in music making, drinking, dancing and courting. Some of the scenes depict gallant gatherings while others possibly involve courtesans or prostitutes.

The religiously themed Exhumation of the bones of St Dymphna and St Gerebernus in the St Dymphna Church in Geel, Belgium is attributed to Vierpeyl.

Works of Vierpeyl are in the collections of the Brukenthal National Museum, the Pushkin Museum and the National Gallery of Ireland.
