= Casino at Marino =

Ornamental building in Dublin, Ireland

- Ceasaíneo ag Mairíne
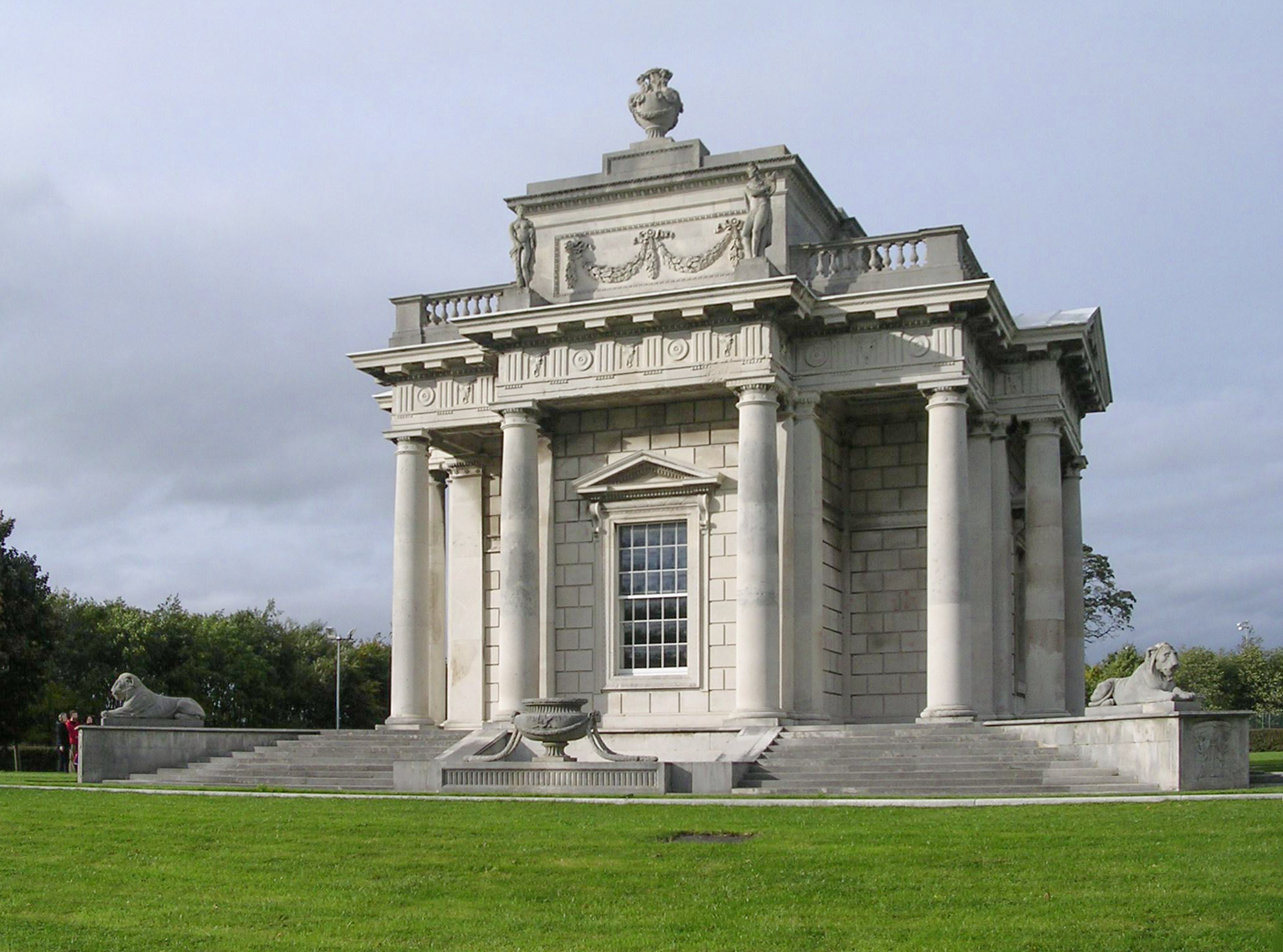
- Etymology: Italian casino, "little house"

General information
- Architectural style: Neoclassical
- Location: Marino, Off Casino Park, Dublin, Ireland
- Coordinates: 53°22′16″N 6°13′37″W
- Elevation: 23 m (75 ft)
- Construction started: 1758
- Completed: 1775

Technical details
- Material: Portland stone
- Floor count: 3
- Floor area: 2,500 square feet (232 m^{2})

Design and construction
- Architects: William Chambers; Simon Vierpyl
- Developer: James Caulfeild, 1st Earl of Charlemont
- Other designers: Simon Vierpyl (Clerk of works)

Other information
- Number of rooms: 16
- Parking: On-site

Website
- casinomarino.ie

National monument of Ireland
- Official name: Casino, Marino
- Reference no.: 302

The Casino at Marino is a Neo-Classical summer or pleasure house, originally located in the grounds of Marino House in Dublin, Ireland. Sometimes described as a folly, it was designed by Scottish architect William Chambers and executed by Simon Vierpyl for James Caulfeild, 1st Earl of Charlemont, starting in the late 1750s and finishing around 1775.

Although proud of the design, Chambers was never able to visit the completed building, as he was constantly employed in England.

== History ==
=== Name ===
The name 'Casino' is the diminutive form of the 18th-century Italian word 'casa' meaning 'house', thus 'little house', and was not used in the modern sense of a gambling establishment. After his 9-year Grand Tour of Italy and Greece, Caulfield was taken with all things Italian, and decided to add a 'little house' or pleasure house to his estate, which he had already named after the town of Marino in Lazio.

=== Planning and development ===
The Casino is one of the few remaining elements that remains of Lord Charlemont's eighteenth-century demesne at Marino. There had also been other ornamental buildings including a gothic room or temple which formed a tall tower (sometimes referred to as Rosamond's Bower), a gothic seat, a cottage orné (the hermitage), extensive walled gardens, a serpentine lake, various ornate gateways and the main Marino House which was itself demolished in the 1920s.

Described by Charles Topham Bowden in his travel guide A Tour Through Ireland of 1791 as a 'terrestrial paradise', the design of the landscape was inspired by Lord Charlemont's extensive Grand Tour. The grounds included a lake and small streams, and at least one tunnel which is still in existence.

=== 19th century ===
In the later 19th century, the estate was sold to the Archdiocese of Dublin under Cardinal Cullen, and later the bulk of it was sold on to the Irish Christian Brothers, with a portion (39 acres) retained for the O'Brien Institute, a school and residence for male orphans.

=== 20th century ===
The tunnel at the Casino was used as a shooting range by Irish revolutionaries including Michael Collins in the 1920s.

In the 1960s, a field attached to the O'Brien Institute was given to the Sisters of Nazareth for the construction of Nazareth House, a residential home for the elderly. Archbishop John Charles McQuaid organised the transfer of the land, and construction began on the new home months before planning permission was granted. The development was a significant encroachment on the views of the Casino.

== Design and construction ==
Widely regarded as one of the most important neo-classical buildings in Ireland, the Casino is notable also for its relatively small size, measuring only fifty feet square to the outer columns. In plan, it takes the form of a Greek Cross with a pair of columns framing each projecting elevation. Seen from the outside, the building has the appearance of a single-roomed structure, with a large panelled door on the north elevation and a single large window on each of the other elevations. This is all an illusion, however, as it actually contains 16 rooms over three floors. Only two of the panels in the door open to allow entrance, and the panes of glass in the windows are subtly curved, disguising the partitioning which allows what looks like a single window to serve several separate rooms.

Many other tricks are used throughout the construction to preserve the apparent simplicity of the design. Four of the columns which surround the building are hollow and, with a length of chain dangling in each, allow rainwater to drain down. The Roman funerary urns on the roof, possibly designed by James Gandon, are also functional chimneys.

Many of the most famous European craftsmen and designers of the era were engaged in the design and construction. Much of the interior was designed by Simon Vierpyl, some of the sculpture including the basalt lions or leopards completed by Joseph Wilton, Johann Heinrich Müntz was engaged to design an Egyptian room and other elements of the interior. It is also likely he designed the large gothic tower in the gardens.

Giovanni Battista Cipriani designed statues of Apollo, Venus, Bacchus and Ceres on the building as well as the dragons or griffins on the gate piers which are still in existence but have been moved to Griffith Avenue rather than their original location near the Malahide Road and now form the entrance to the Marino Institute of Education.

Matthew Peters was also consulted about designing a stove and garden walks for Francis Caulfeild, 2nd Earl of Charlemont.

The structure includes a basement level with servants quarters which were originally labelled as the ale and wine cellar, servants hall, butlers pantry, pantry, kitchen and scullery.

The main floor with reception rooms were labelled as the vestibule (with coffered ceiling), saloon, study and a bedroom.

The top storey included servants' rooms and a State Bedroom. One of the rooms includes the Blue Salon which features an intricately detailed hardwood parquet floor, with the Star of David in the centre, fine stucco work on the ceiling and a white marble fireplace.

Originally the Casino may have been linked to Marino House or other nearby structures by a tunnel. Various tunnels leading to and from the structure are still in existence.

=== Gallery ===
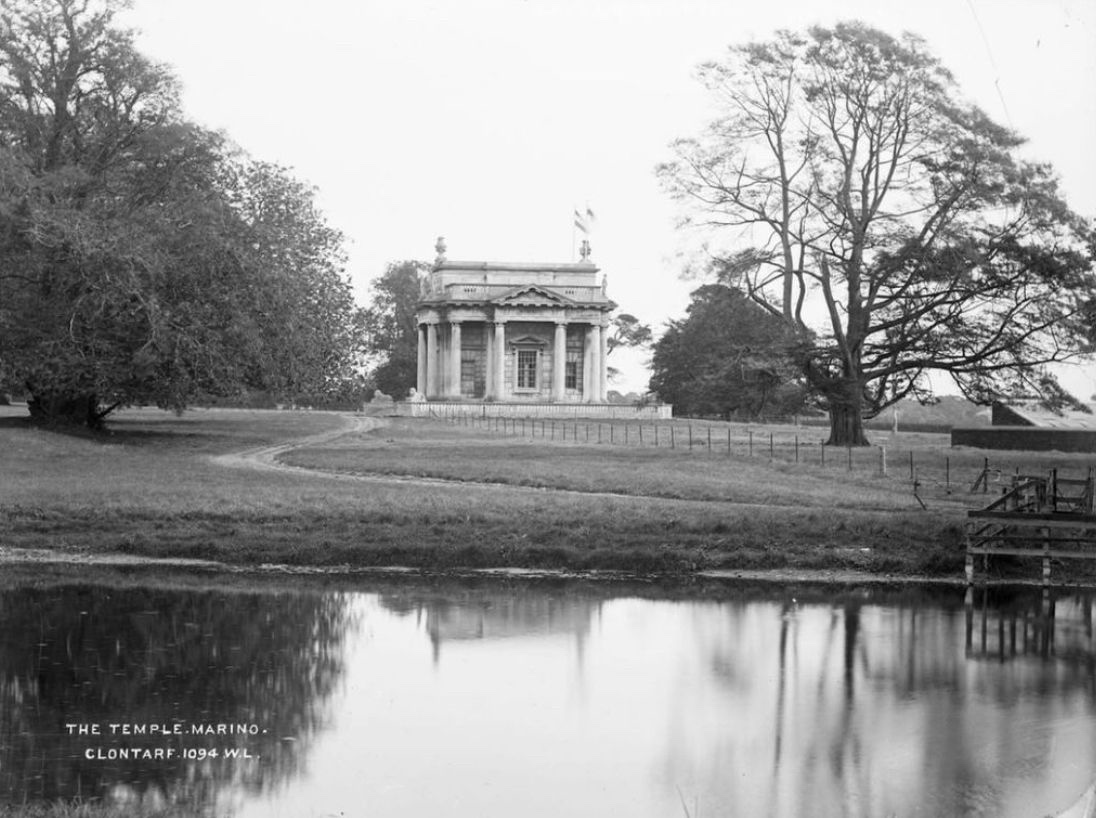
Casino at Marino, Clontarf

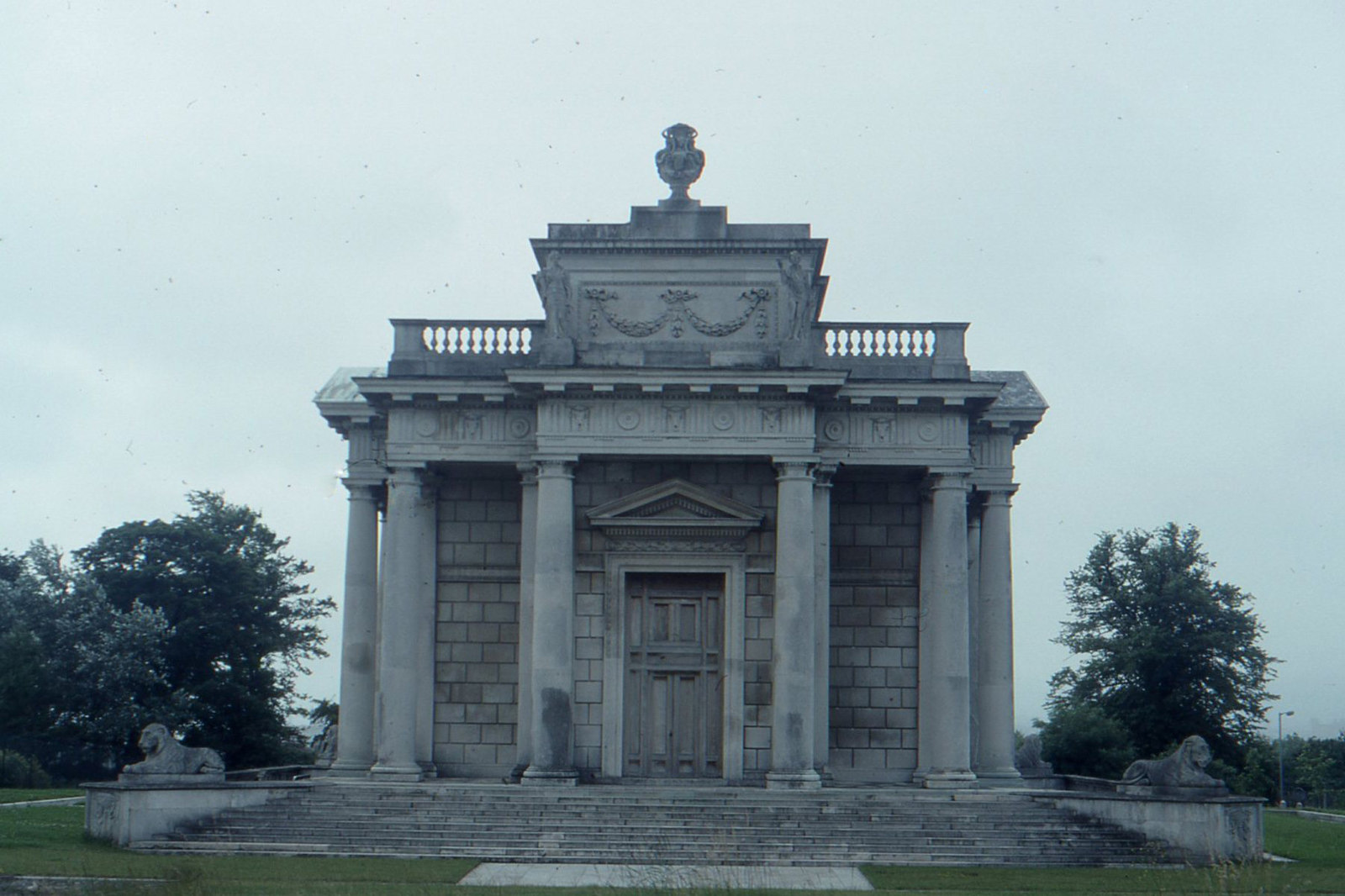
The structure in 1993

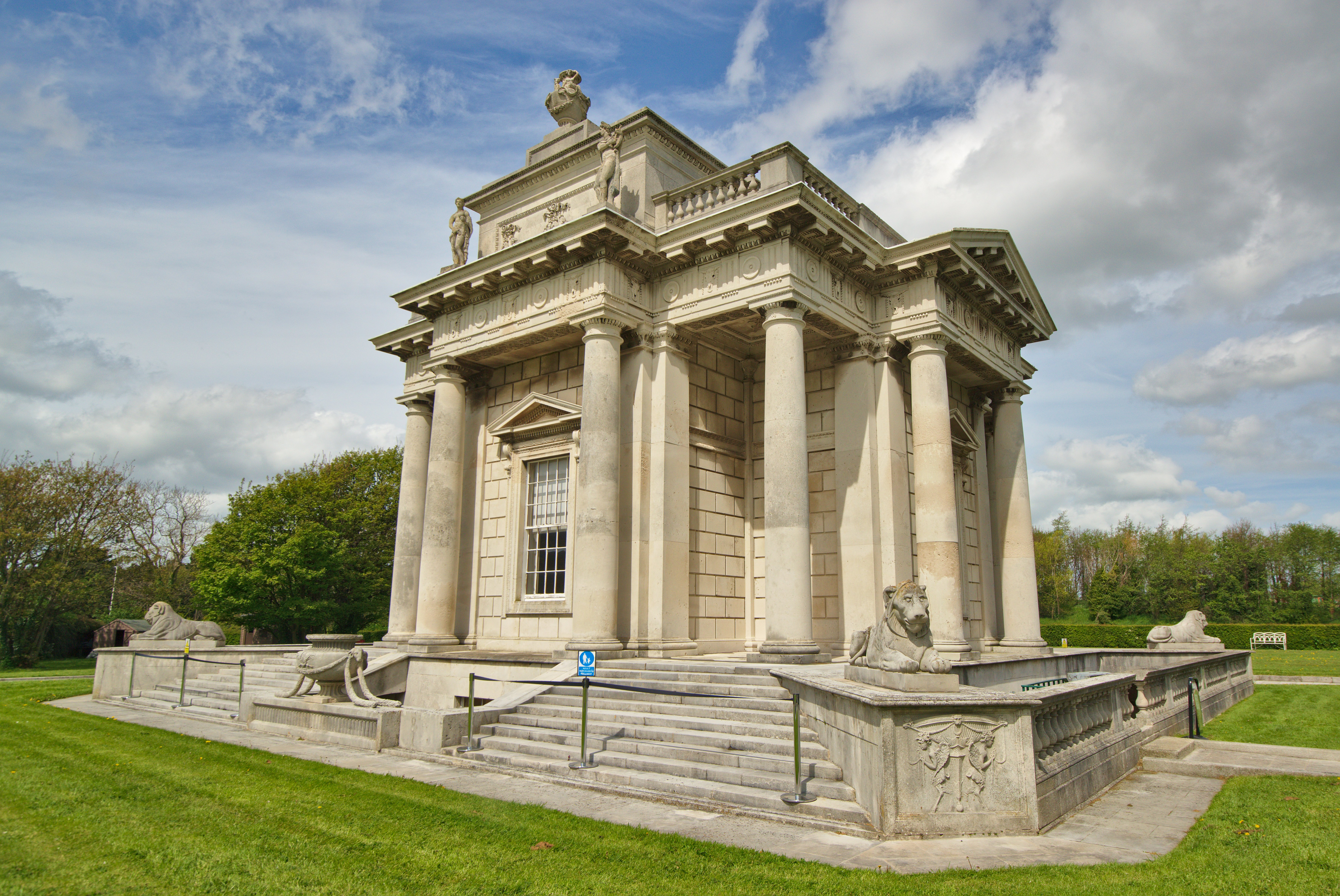
Exterior

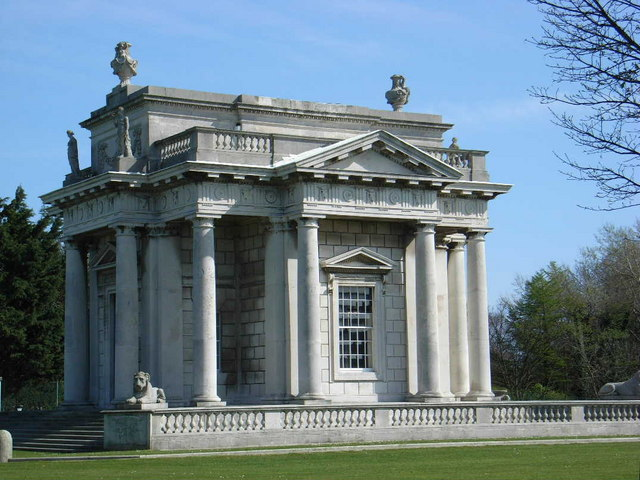
Exterior side

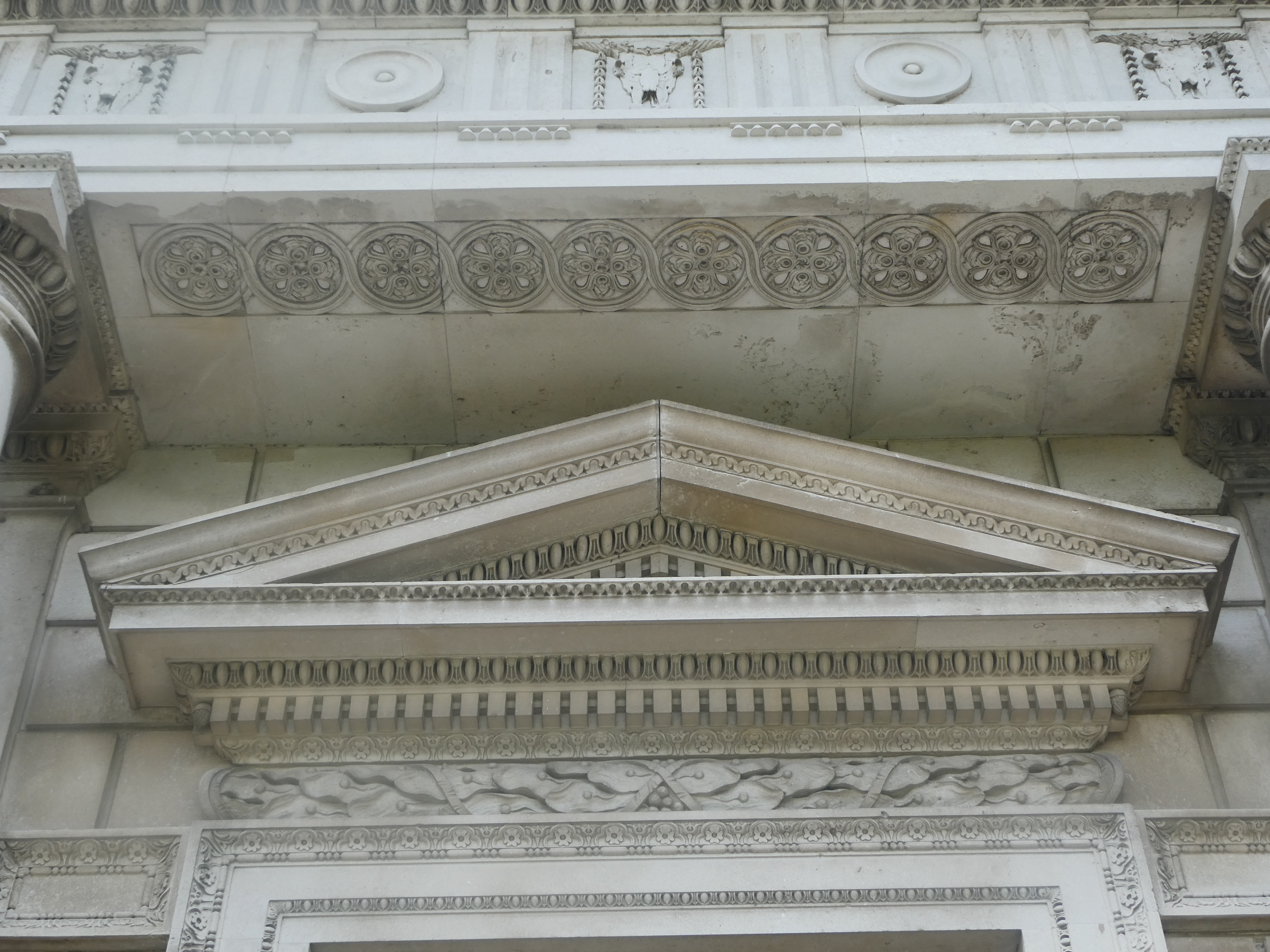
Tympanum with egg-and-dart and dentition

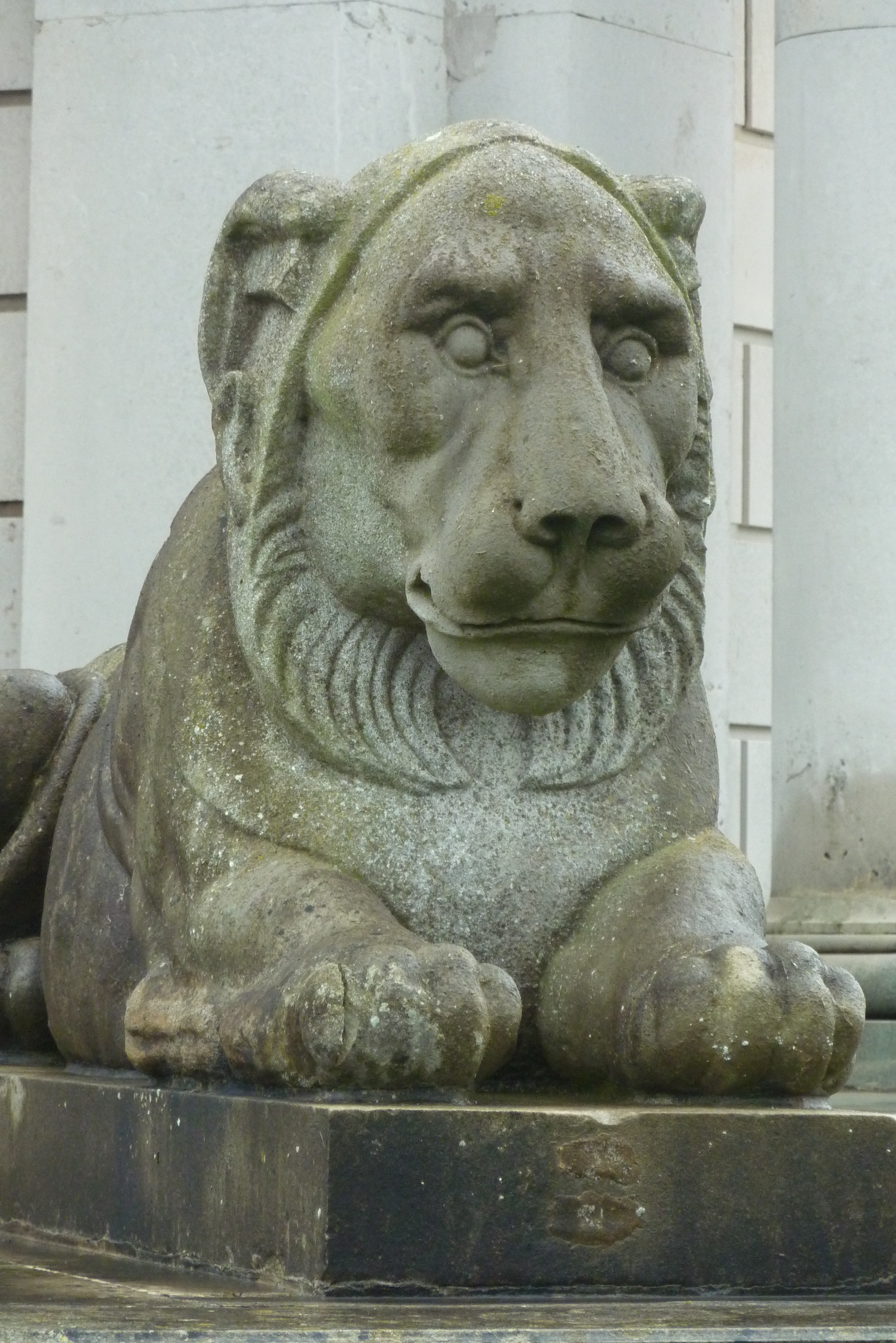
Stone lion

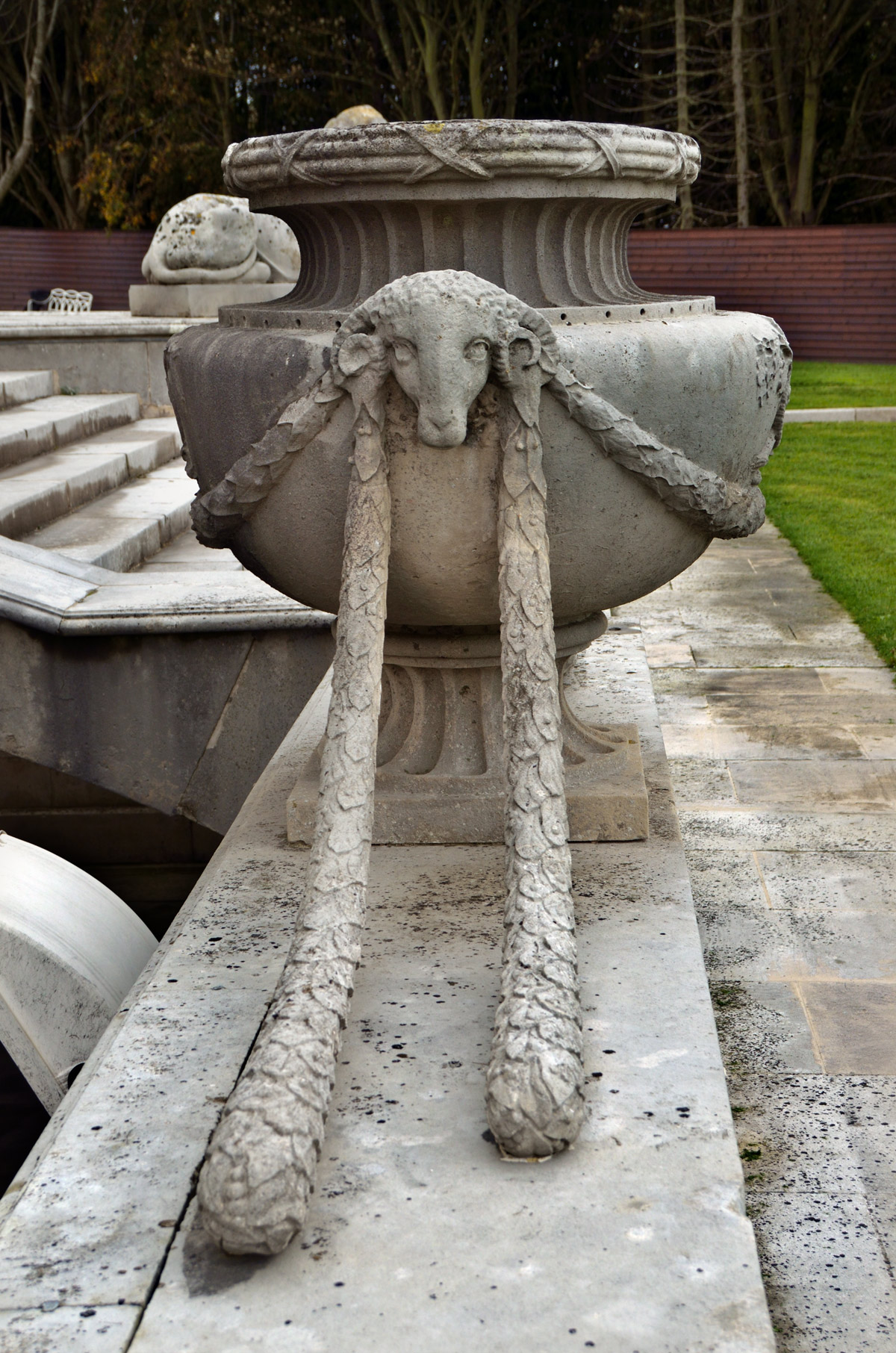
Stone vase with sheep design

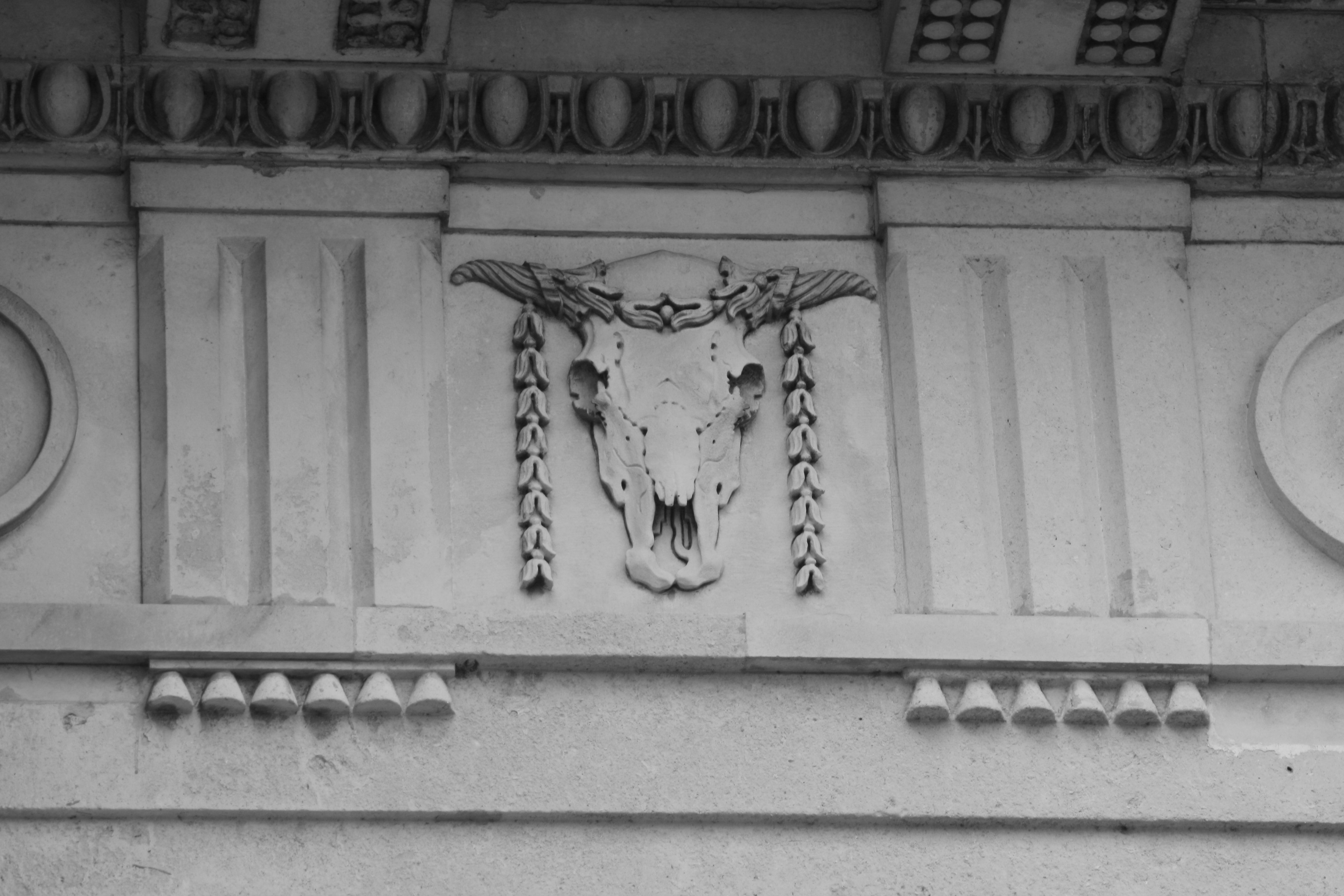
Carved cow's skull with garland

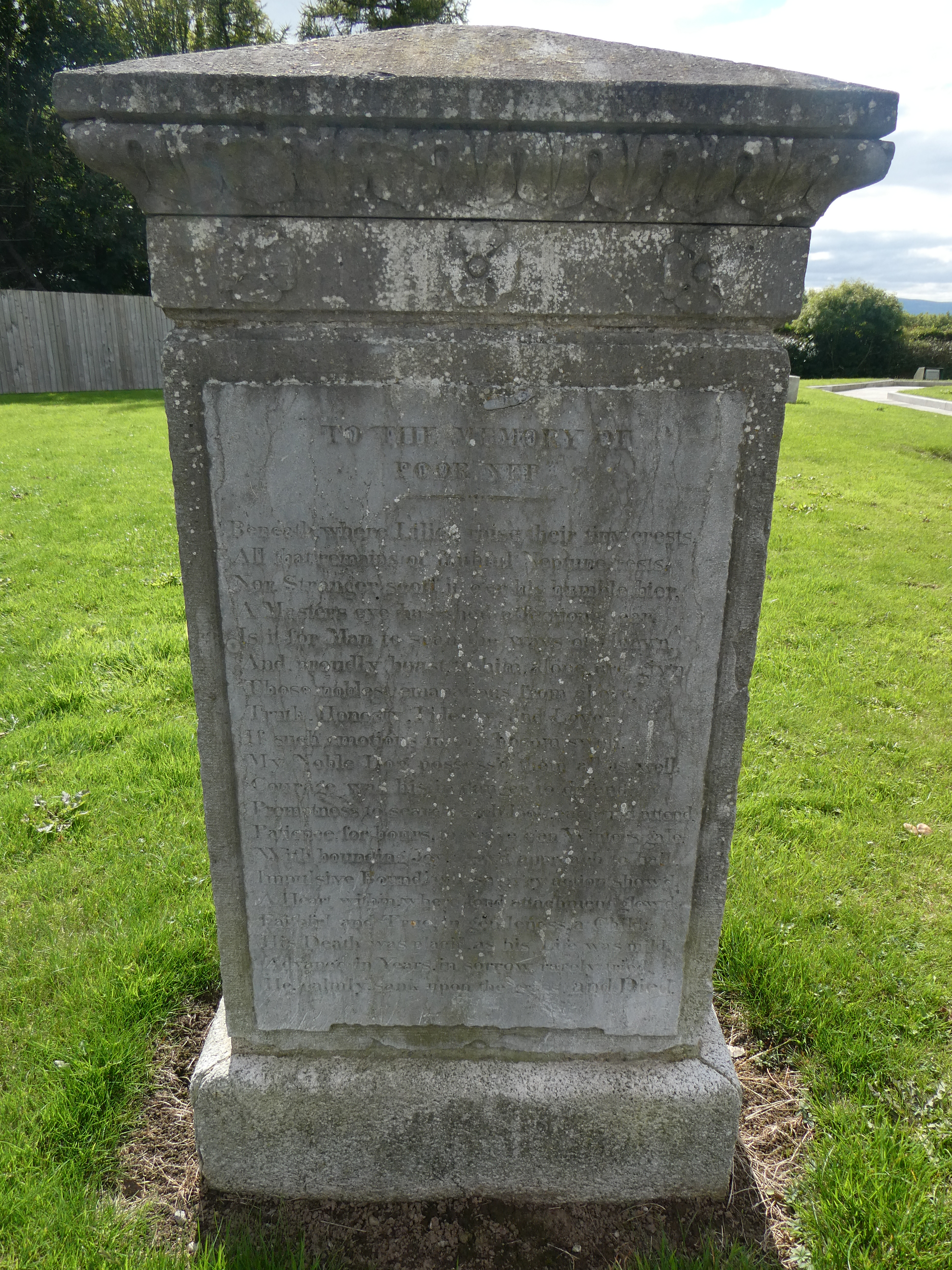
Gravestone of "Neptune", a dog

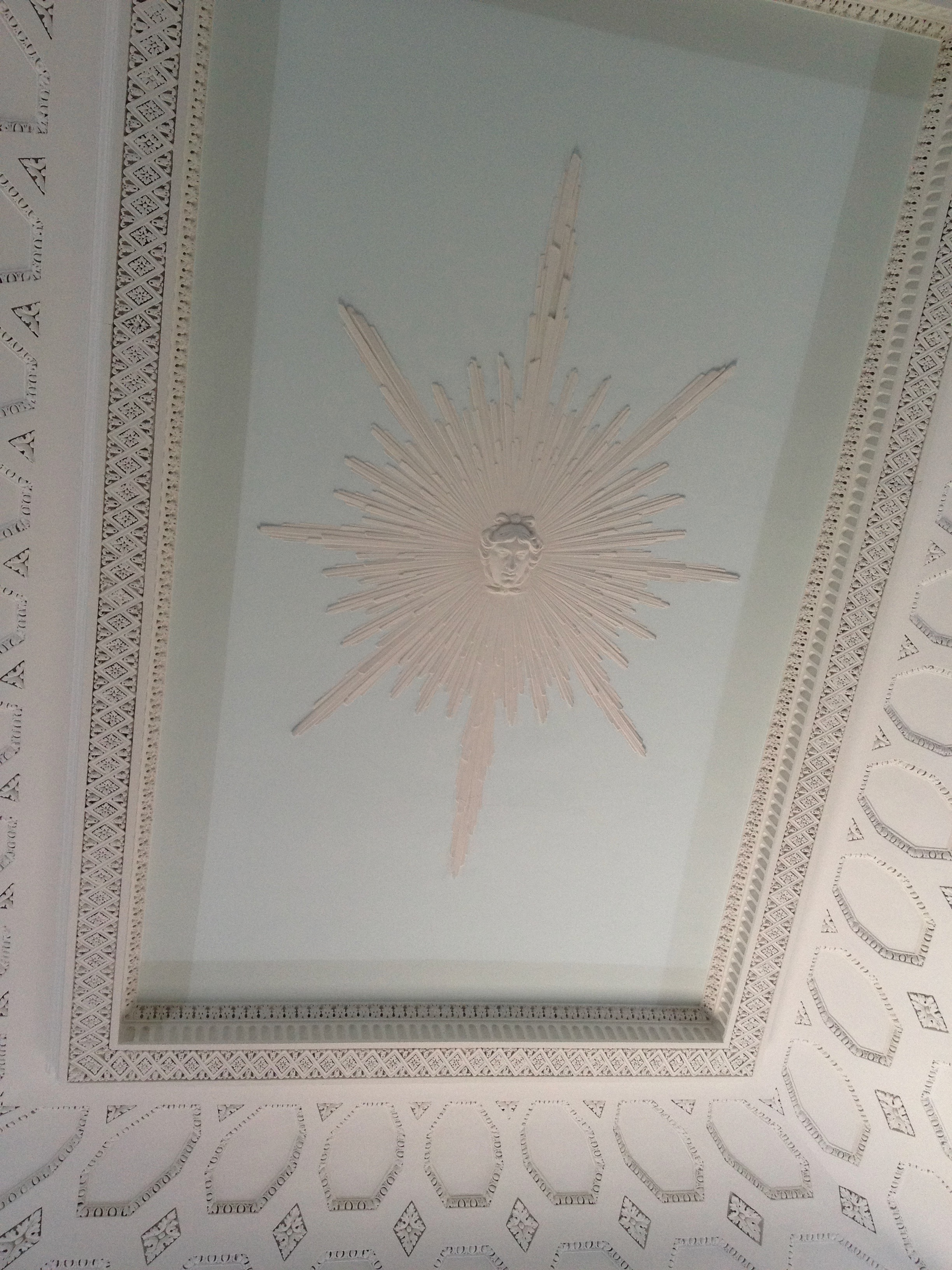
Ceiling of the Blue Salon with rectangular and octagonal coffered design

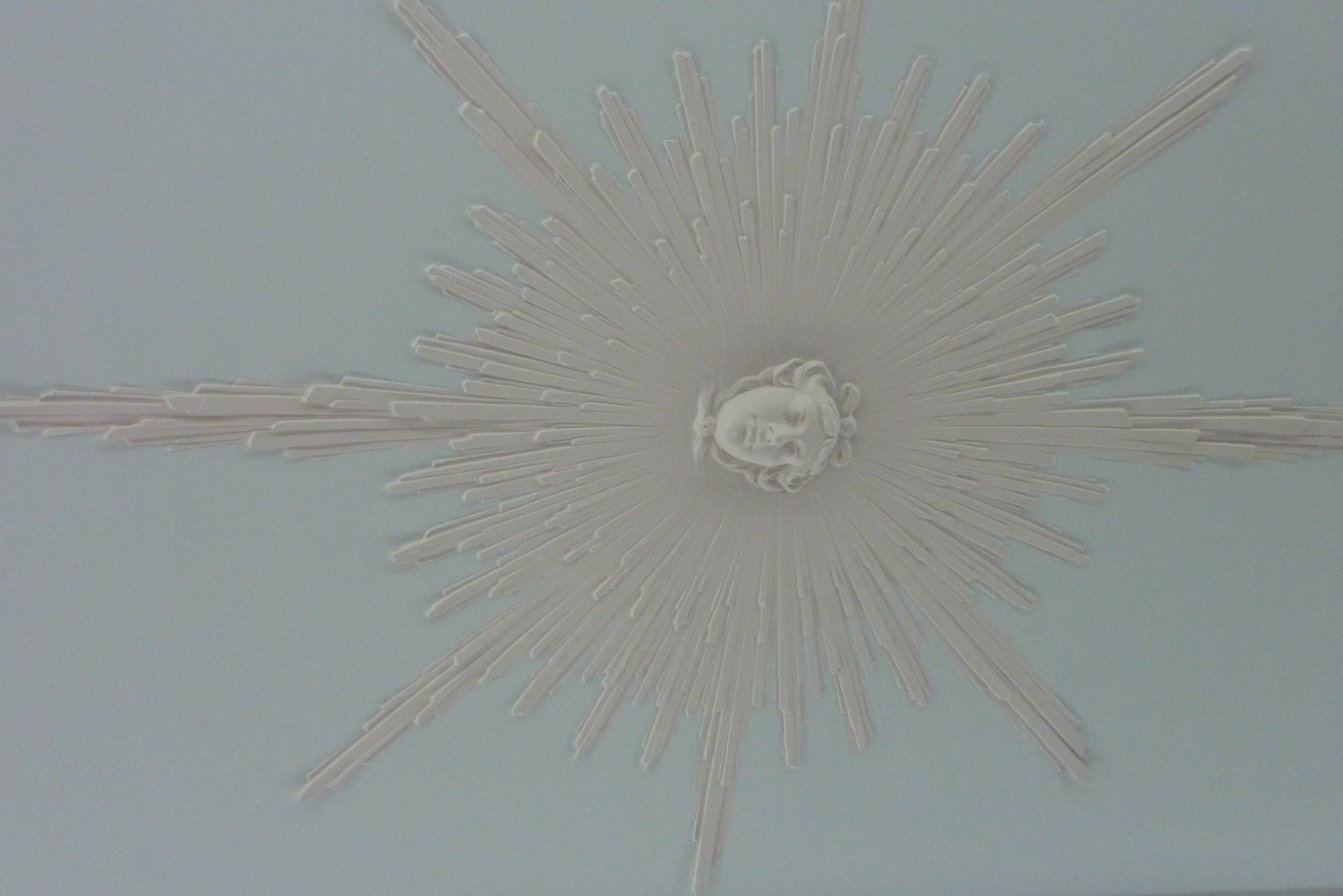
Zeus ceiling rose in the Blue Salon

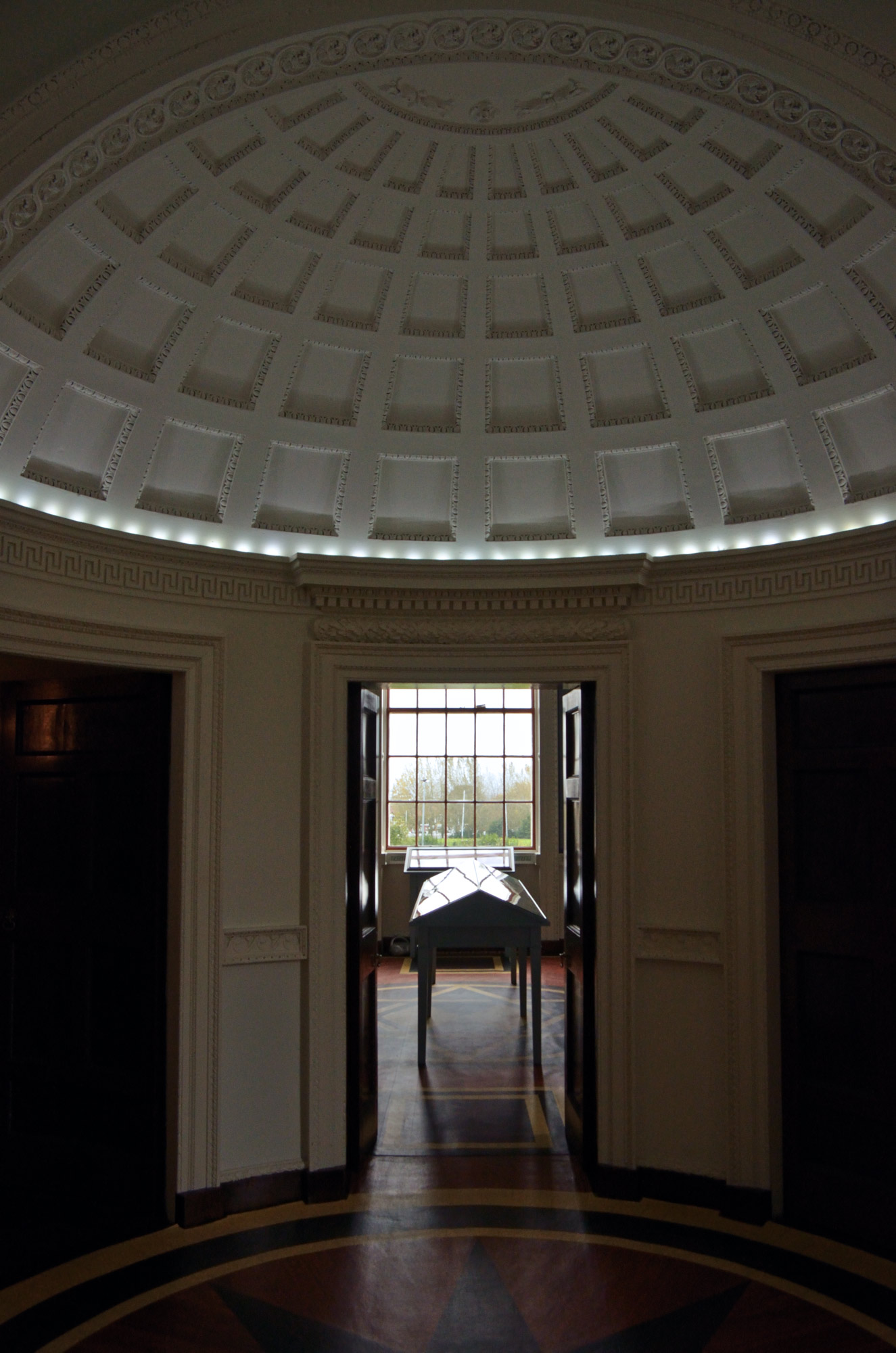
Vestibule

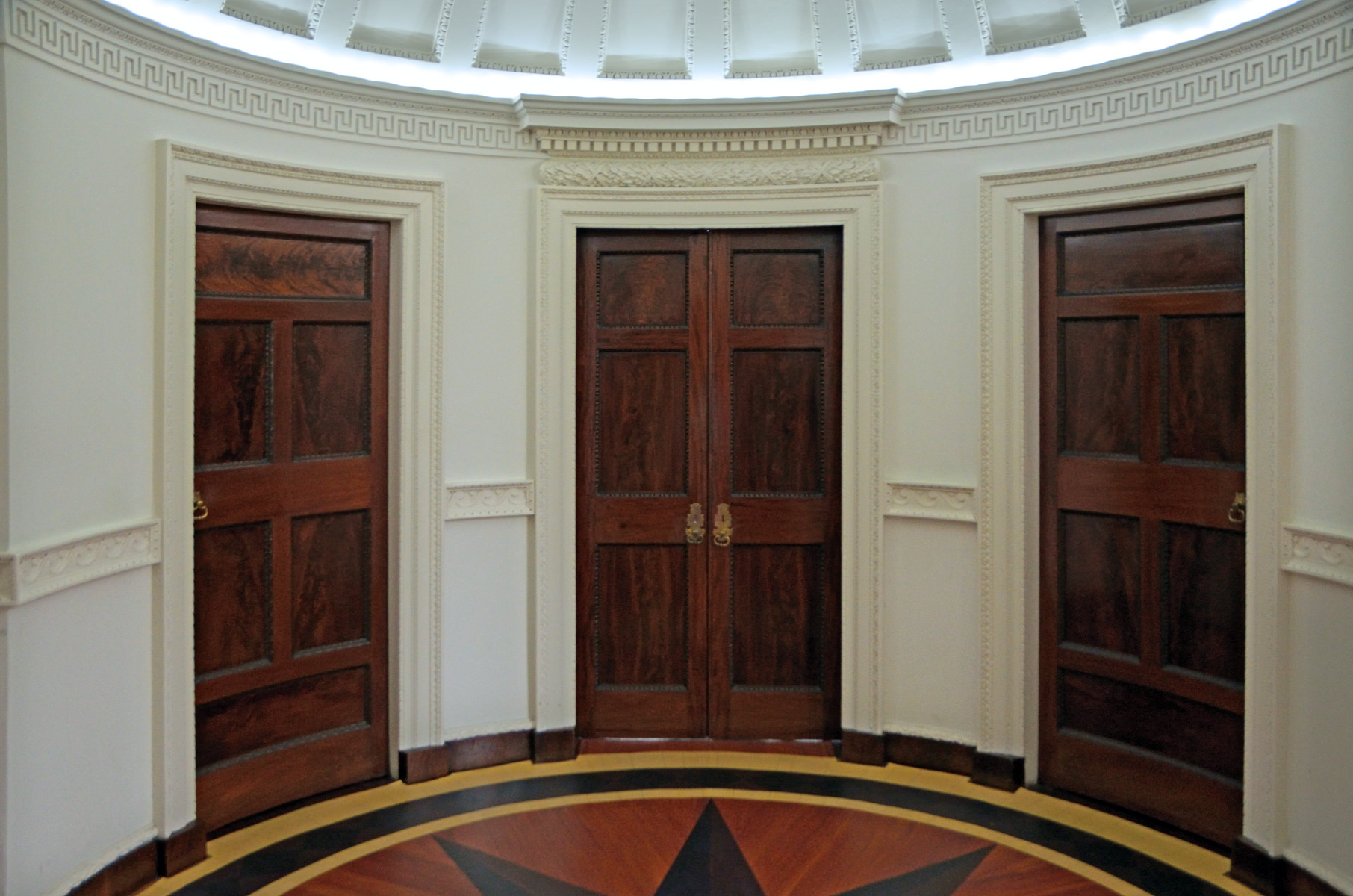
vestibule

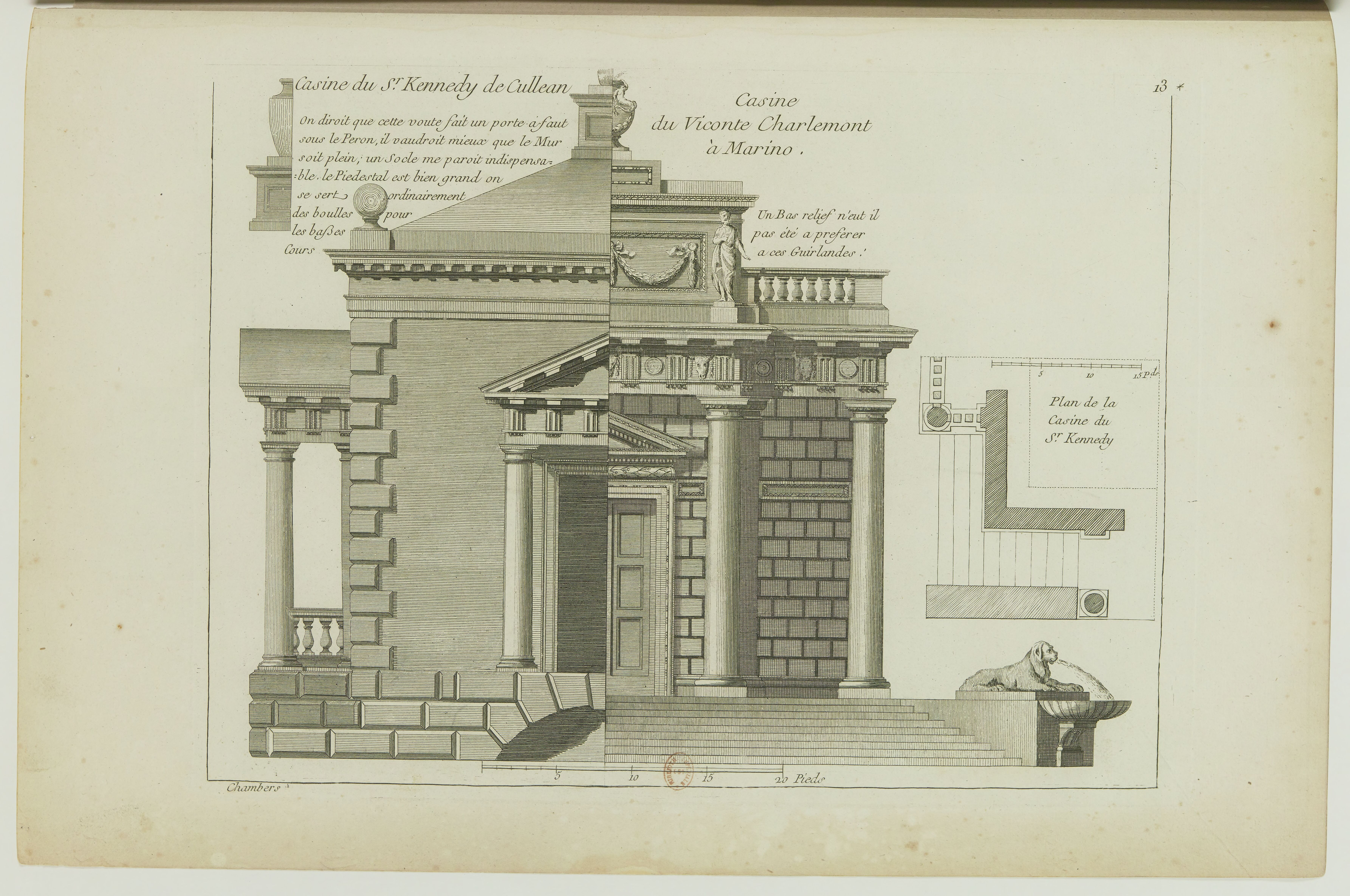
Plan of section

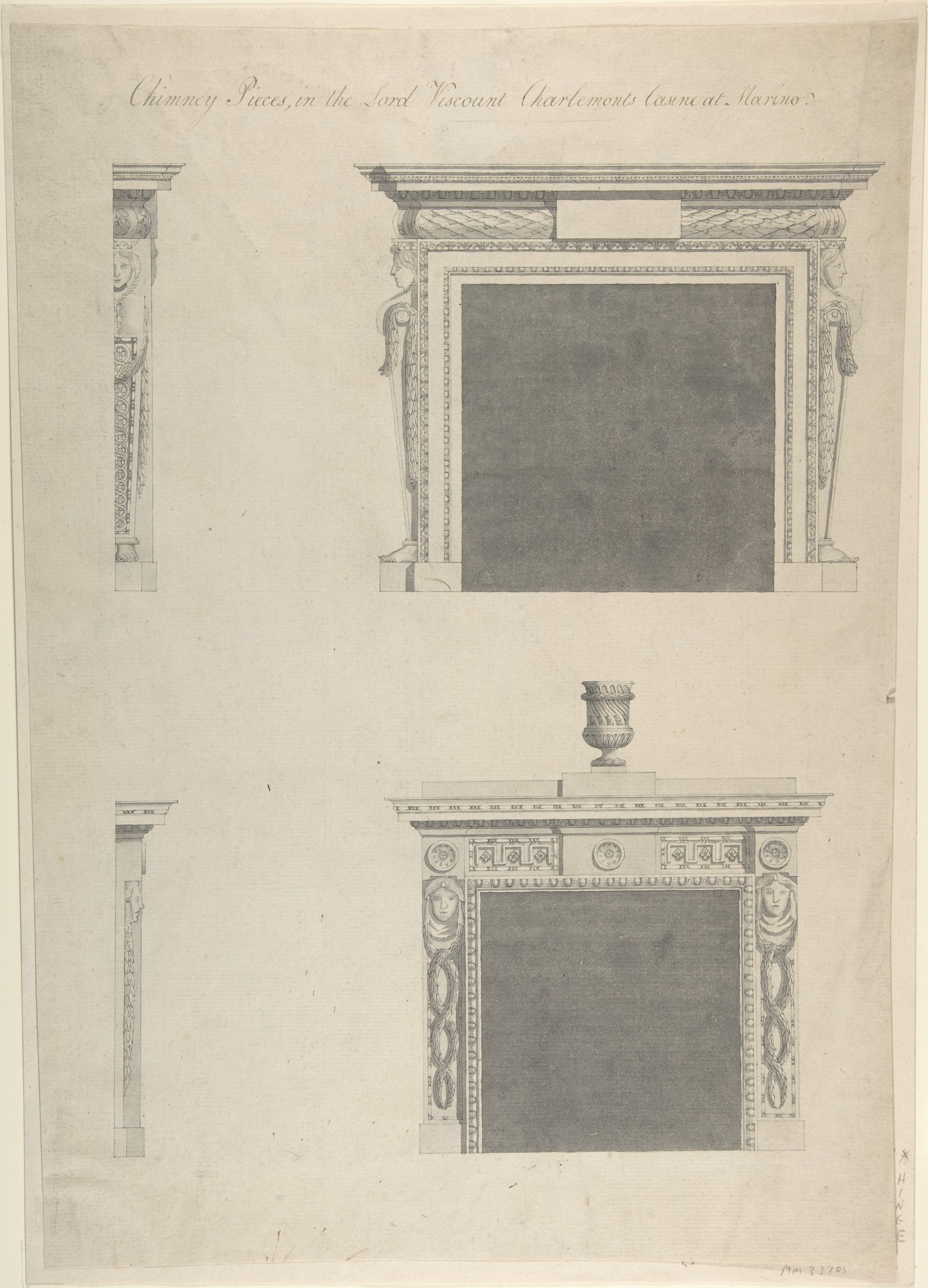
Designs for two chimney-pieces by William Chambers in the Metropolitan Museum of Art

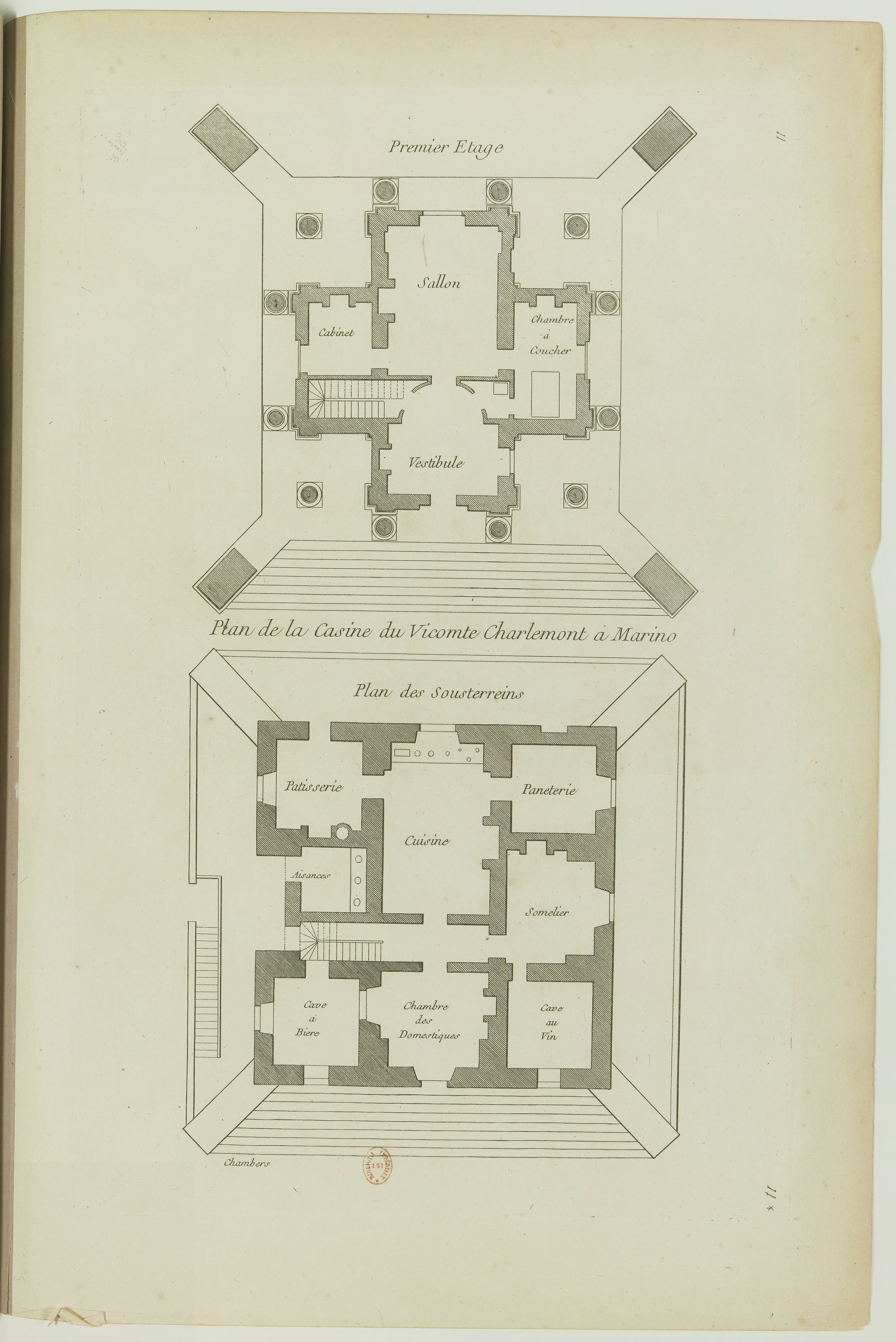
Original interior plan

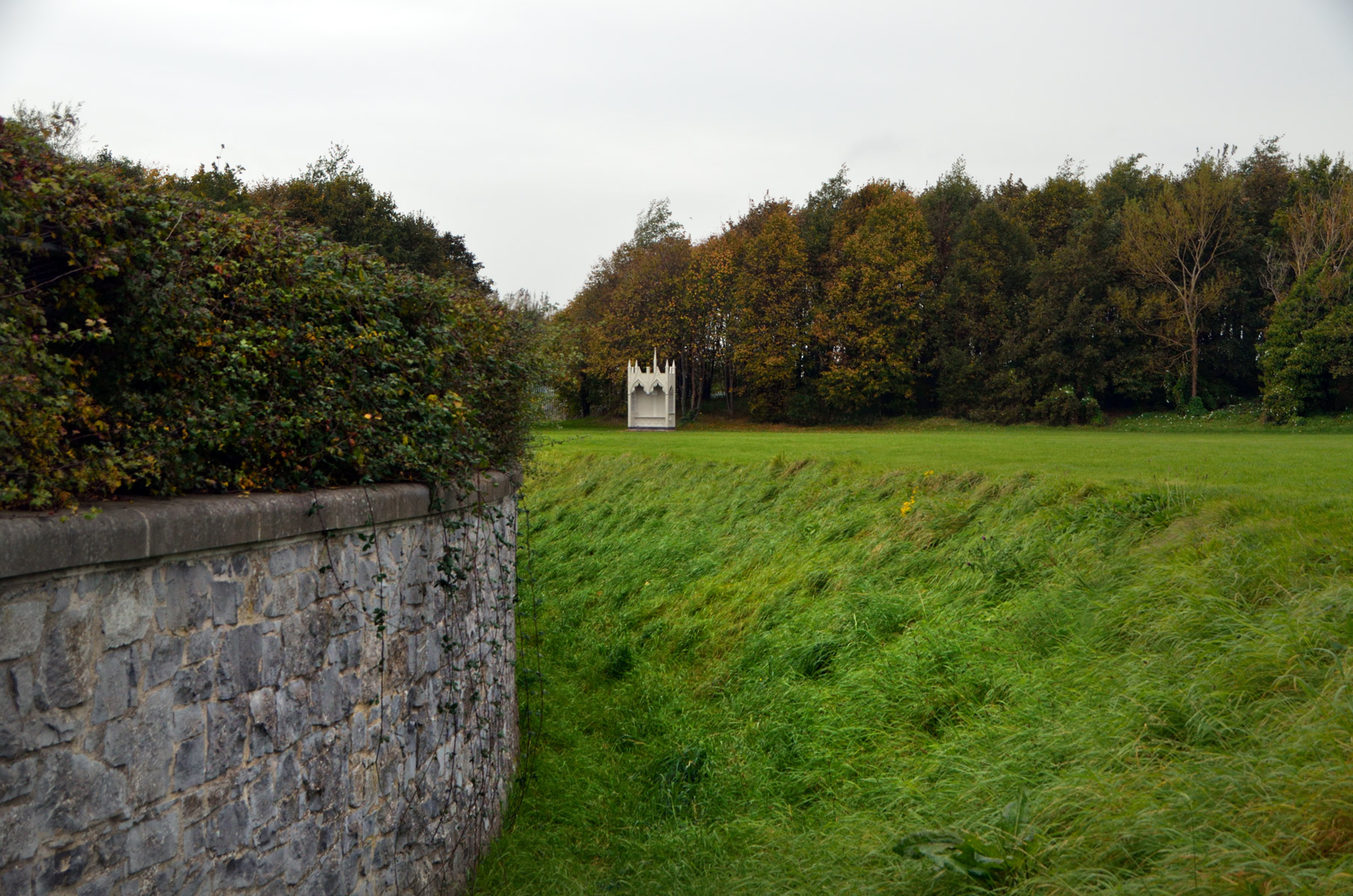
Reproduction of Gothic seat folly within the grounds

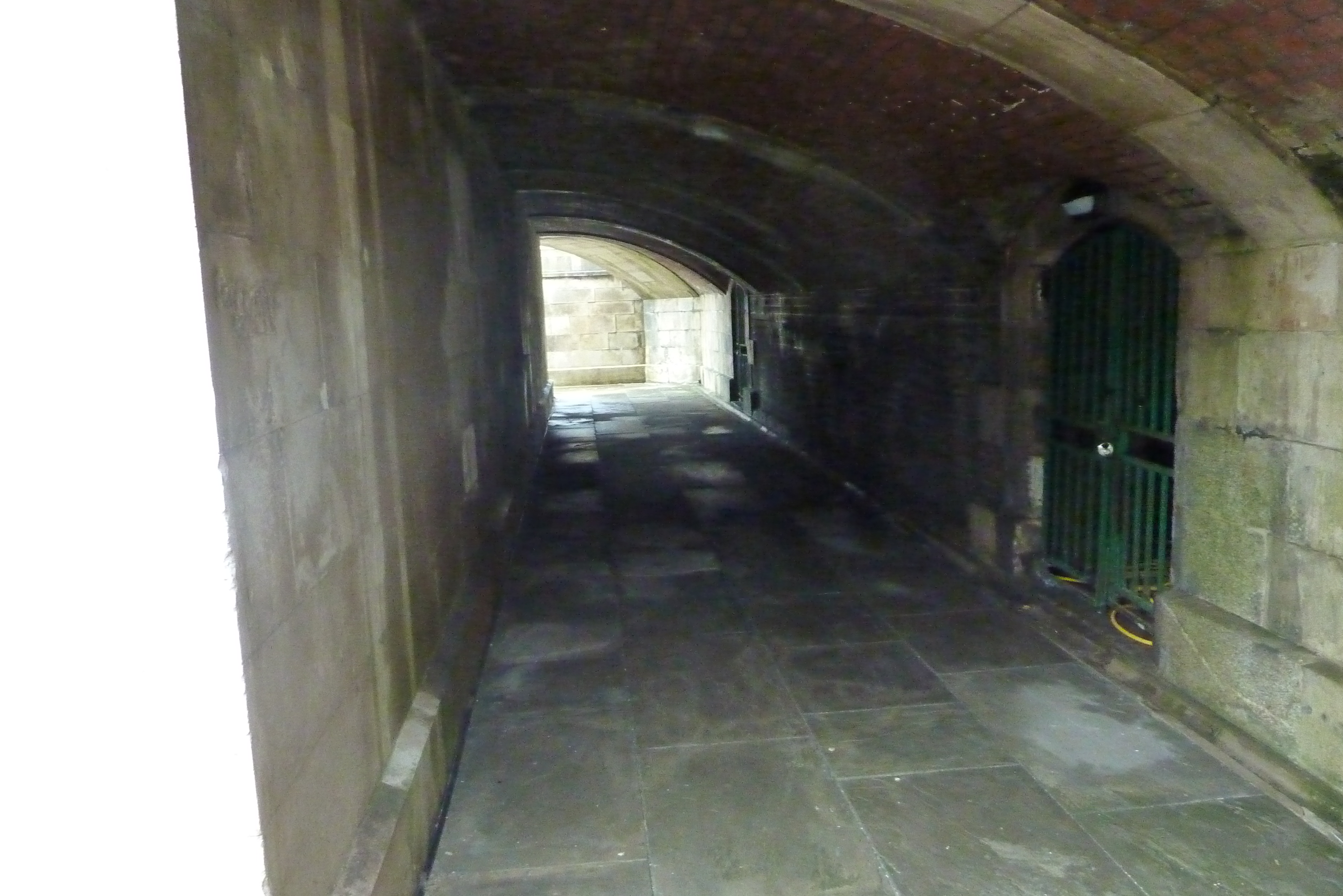
Entrance to tunnels underneath the structure
