= Canning (name) =

Canning is a name. It may refer to:

- Albert Canning (army officer) (1860–1961), English army officer
- Albert Canning (police officer) (1885–1969), English police officer
- Alfred Canning (1860–1936), Australian surveyor
- Andrea Canning (born 1972), North American TV news reporter
- Ava Canning (born 2004), Irish cricketer
- Brendan Canning (born 1969), Canadian musician
- Bridget Canning, Canadian writer
- Charles Canning (1842–1894), American politician from Minnesota
- Charles Canning, 1st Earl Canning (1812–1862), British statesman and Governor-General of India
- Charlotte Canning, Countess Canning (1817–1861), wife of Charles Canning
- Curtis Canning (born 1946), American rower at the 1968 Summer Olympics
- Danny Canning (1926–2014), Welsh footballer
- David Canning, British economist
- Effie I. Canning (1857–1940), American actress, composer of "Rock-a-bye Baby"
- Elizabeth Canning (1734–1773), Englishwoman transported for perjury
- Emma Canning, Irish actress
- Ernest Canning (1902–1995), English cricketer
- Florence Canning (1863–1914), British suffragette
- Ger Canning (born 1951), Irish sports commentator
- Griffin Canning (born 1996), American professional baseball pitcher
- Heather Canning (1933–1996), English actress
- Iain Canning (born 1979), English film and television producer
- Jack Canning (born 1999), Irish hurler
- Joan Canning, 1st Viscountess Canning (1776–1837), wife of George Canning
- Joe Canning (born 1988), Irish hurler
- Joseph A. Canning (1882–1951), American Catholic priest
- Jordan Canning, Canadian film and television director
- Joseph A. Canning (1882–1951), American Jesuit missionary and educator
- Kathleen Canning, American history professor
- Ken Canning, Murri activist and writer
- Larry Canning (1925–2012), Scottish footballer
- Lisa Canning (born 1966), U.S. television presenter
- M. F. A. Canning (born Marinus Francis Alfred Canning, generally known as Alfred Canning; 1829–1911), Australian politician
- Manus Canning (died 2018), Irish republican politician
- Martin Canning (born 1981), Scottish football player
- Ollie Canning (born 1976), Irish hurler
- Patrick Canning (1915–1991), Canadian educator and politician from Newfoundland
- Perry Canning, Canadian politician
- Philomena Canning (1959–2019), Irish midwife and advocate for natural birth
- Richard Canning (1708–1775), English topographer and Anglican priest
- Ryan Canning (born 1984), South African cricketer
- Sadie Canning (1930–2008), Australian healthcare professional and human rights activist
- Samuel Canning (1823–1908), English submarine telegraphy pioneer
- Sara Canning (born 1987), Canadian actress
- Stratford Canning, 1st Viscount Stratford de Redcliffe (1786–1880), British ambassador to the Ottoman Empire
- Tama Canning (born 1977), Australian-born New Zealand cricketer
- Thomas Canning (1911–1989), American composer
- Victor Canning (1911–1986), British novelist
- Warren Canning (1927–2012), Australian footballer
- William Canning (1778–1860), British Anglican priest

== Disambiguation pages ==
- George Canning (disambiguation)
- Mark Canning (disambiguation)

== See also ==
- The Canning family from the Australian soap opera Neighbours, including:
  - Gary Canning
  - Kyle Canning
  - Levi Canning
  - Naomi Canning
  - Sheila Canning
  - Xanthe Canning
