= Ger Millerick =

Irish hurler (born 1999)

Personal information
- Native name: Gearóid Ó Maoilgheiric (Irish)
- Born: 1999 (age 26–27) Ballymacoda, County Cork, Ireland
- Occupation: Secondary school teacher
- Height: 6 ft 1 in (185 cm)

Sport
- Sport: Hurling
- Position: Midfield
Clubs
- Years: Club
- 2017-present 2017-2019: Fr O'Neill's → Imokilly
Club titles
- Cork titles: 3
College(s)
- Years: College
- Waterford Institute of Technology; University College Cork
College titles
- Fitzgibbon titles: 0
Inter-county*
Years	County	Apps (scores)
2018-present	Cork	0 (0-00)
Inter-county titles
- Munster titles: 0
- All-Irelands: 0
- NHL: 1
- All Stars: 0
- *Inter County team apps and scores correct as of 18:41, 1 December 2018.

Ger Millerick (born 1999) is an Irish hurler who plays as a midfielder for club side Fr. O'Neill's, divisional side Imokilly and at inter-county level with the Cork senior hurling team.

== Playing career ==
=== Midleton CBS ===
Millerick played in all grades of hurling with Midleton CBS Secondary School before progressing onto the college's senior team. On 15 December 2016, he was at right corner-forward when Midelton CBS defeated St. Colman's College from Fermoy by 0–11 to 0–10 to win the Dr. O'Callaghan Cup.

On 13 December 2017, Millerick won a second successive Dr. O'Callaghan Cup title following Midleton CBS's 1–20 to 0–13 defeat of Gaelcholáiste Mhuire AG in the final.

=== Fr. O'Neill's ===
Millerick joined the Fr. O'Neill's club at a young age and played in all grades at juvenile and underage levels. . On 8 December 2018, he was described as a "special talent" when Fr. O'Neill's defeated Midleton by 3–34 to 4–18 to win the Cork Premier Under-21 Championship title.

On 16 July 2017, Millerick made his first appearance in the championship appearance for the club's top adult team. He was at right wing-back when Fr. O'Neill's defeated Kilworth by 3–14 to 0-08.

On 12 October 2019, Millerick lined out at left corner-back when Fr. O'Neill's faced Kilworth in the Cork Premier Intermediate Championship final and collected a winners' medal following the 3–23 to 1–20 victory. He was joined on the starting 15 by his three brothers Mike(Hoover) Thomas and Joe another brother John was on the panel.

=== Imokilly ===
Millerick's performances at club level lead to him being selected for the Imokilly divisional team for the 2017 Cork Senior Championship. On 22 October, he scored a point from midfield when Imokilly defeated Blackrock by 3–13 to 0–18 to win the Cork Senior Championship final for the first time since 1998.

On 14 October 2018, Millerick was introduced as a 48th-minute substitute when Imokilly retained the title after a 4–19 to 1–18 defeat of Midleton in the final.

On 20 October 2019, Millerick played in a third successive county final. Lining out at left corner-back, he ended the game with a third successive winners' medal after the 2–17 to 1–16 defeat of Glen Rovers.

=== Cork ===
==== Minor, under-21 and under-20 ====
Millerick first lined out for Cork as a member of the minor team during the 2017 Munster Championship. He made his first appearance on 3 May when he lined out at left wing-back in Cork's 1–24 to 0–08 defeat of Waterford. On 9 July, Millerick was again at left wing-back when Cork defeated Clare by 4–21 to 0–16 to win the Munster Championship for the first time since 2008. On 3 September, he lined out in the 2–17 to 2–14 defeat by Galway in the All-Ireland final at Croke Park.

Millerick subsequently joined the Cork under-21 team for the 2018 Munster Championship. On 4 July, he won a Munster Championship medal as an unused substitute following Cork's 2–23 to 1–13 defeat of Tipperary in the final. On 26 August, Millerick came on as a 67th-minute substitute for Jack O'Connor in Cork's 3–13 to 1-16 All-Ireland final defeat by Tipperary.

On 3 July 2019, Millerick made his first appearance for Cork's inaugural under-20 team in the Munster Championship. He started the game on the bench but was introduced as a 33rd-minute substitute for Ryan Walsh at right corner-back in the 1–20 to 0–16 defeat of Limerick. On 23 July 2019, Millerick was at left wing-back when Cork suffered a 3–15 to 2–17 defeat by Tipperary in the Munster final. He was selected at right wing-back when Cork faced Tipperary for a second time in the All-Ireland final on 24 August 2019, however, he ended the game on the losing side after a 5–17 to 1–18 defeat.

==== Intermediate ====
On 28 July 2018, Millerick was selected for the Cork intermediate team for the first time. He lined out at left corner-back in Cork's 2–19 to 0–18 defeat of Kilkenny in the All-Ireland final.

==== Senior ====
Millerick made his first appearance for the Cork senior team on 3 February 2019. He was introduced as a 68th-minute substitute for Conor O'Sullivan in a 1–18 to 0–17 defeat of Wexford in the National Hurling League.

== Career statistics ==
=== Division ===
As of match played 20 October 2019.

Team	Year	Cork SHC	
Team	Year	Apps	Score
Imokilly	2017	5	0-02
Imokilly	2018	3	0-00
Imokilly	2019	6	0-00
Total		14	0-02

=== Inter-county ===
As of match played 16 June 2019.

Team	Year	National League			Munster		All-Ireland		Total	
Team	Year	Division	Apps	Score	Apps	Score	Apps	Score	Apps	Score
Cork	2019	Division 1A	2	0-00	0	0-00	0	0-00	2	0-00
Career total			2	0-00	0	0-00	0	0-00	2	0-00

== Honours ==
Midleton CBS

- Dr. O'Callaghan Cup: 2016, 2017

Fr. O'Neill's

- Cork Senior A Hurling Championship: 2022
- Munster Intermediate Club Hurling Championship: 2019
- Cork Premier Intermediate Hurling Championship: 2019
- Cork Premier Under-21 A Hurling Championship: 2018

Imokilly

- Cork Senior Hurling Championship: 2017, 2018, 2019

Cork

- National Hurling League: 2025
- All-Ireland Intermediate Hurling Championship: 2018
- Munster Under-21 Hurling Championship: 2018
- Munster Minor Hurling Championship: 2017
