= Brian Turnbull =

Irish hurler (born 1999)

Personal information
- Native name: Brian Torbóil (Irish)
- Born: 1999 (age 26–27) Douglas, Cork, Ireland
- Occupation: Accountant
- Height: 4 ft 7 in (140 cm)

Sport
- Sport: Hurling
- Position: Left corner-forward
Club*
Years	Club	Apps (scores)
2017-present	Douglas	12 (1-26)
Club titles
- Cork titles: 0
College
- Years: College
- 2018-2022: University College Cork
College titles
- Fitzgibbon titles: 0
Inter-county**
Years	County	Apps (scores)
2019-2021	Cork	1 (0-00)
Inter-county titles
- Munster titles: 0
- All-Irelands: 0
- NHL: 0
- All Stars: 0
- * club appearances and scores correct as of 23:15, 11 June 2023. **Inter County team apps and scores correct as of 22:44, 31 October 2020.

Brian Turnbull (born 1999) is an Irish hurler who plays for Cork Senior Championship club Douglas and at inter-county level with the Cork senior hurling team. He usually lines out as a left corner-forward.

== Playing career ==
=== St. Francis College ===
Turnbull first came to prominence as a hurler with St. Francis College in Rochestown. He played in every grade of hurling before eventually joining the college's senior hurling team. On 21 December 2015, Turnbull scored 3-04 for St. Francis College when they defeated Scoil Mhuire gan Smál from Blarney to win the Dr. O'Callaghan Cup.

=== Douglas ===
Turnbull joined the Douglas club at a young age and played in all grades at juvenile and underage levels. On 21 September 2015, he scored three points from right corner-forward when Douglas defeated Sarsfields by 3–12 to 0–13 to win the Premier 1 MHC title.

Turnbull subsequently joined the Douglas under-21 team. On 13 November 2016, he won a Cork Premier Under-21 Championship title after a defeat of reigning-champions Blackrock.

Turnbull made his first senior championship appearance on 7 May 2017 when he came on as a substitute in a 0–22 to 0–20 defeat by Cork Institute of Technology.

On 10 September 2017, Turnbull ruptured his anterior cruciate ligament (ACL) during a training session with the Douglas under-21 football team. He later said: "I was coming onto a ball and while I was turning, another player came into the back of me. The knee was driven inwards, I heard the pop. I went down and I wasn’t able to walk then. I went about getting the scan done as quick as possible. If anybody told me it was going to be the cruciate, I refused to listen. I probably should have because it made the hearing very hard to take. I was very upset for the next couple of weeks after it but I have to start moving on." Turnbull underwent surgery at the Santry Sports Clinic on 31 October.

=== Cork ===
==== Minor, under-21 and under-20 ====
Turnbull first lined out for Cork as a member of the minor team during the 2016 Munster Championship. He was an unused substitute when Cork exited the championship after a 0–23 to 1–12 defeat by Tipperary at the semi-final stage.

Turnbull was eligible for the minor grade again the following year and made his first appearance on 3 May 2017. He scored ten points, including three frees, in Cork's 1–24 to 0–08 defeat if Waterford. On 9 July, Turnbull scored four points when Cork defeated Clare by 4–21 to 0–16 to win the Munster Championship for the first time since 2008. On 3 September, he was at left corner-forward when Cork faced Galway in the All-Ireland final. Turnbull finished the game as top scorer with 1-07, however, Cork were defeated by 2–17 to 2–15. He finished the championship as top scorer while he was later included at left corner-forward on the inaugural GAA Minor Star Awards Hurling Team of the Year as well as being named GAA Minor Star Hurler of the Year.

On 26 August 2018, Turnbull was named on the Cork under-21 team as a substitute for the All-Ireland final against Tipperary. He was introduced as a 38th-minute substitute for Liam Healy in the 3–13 to 1–16 defeat.

On 3 July 2019, Turnbull made his first appearance for Cork's inaugural under-20 team. He scored four points from right corner-forward in the 1–20 to 0–16 defeat of Limerick. On 23 July 2019, Turnbull scored two points from play when Cork suffered a 3–15 to 2–17 defeat by Tipperary in the Munster final. He was selected at right corner-forward when Cork faced Tipperary for a second time in the All-Ireland final on 24 August 2019. Turnbull top scored for Cork with 0-08, including seven frees, but ended the game on the losing side after a 5–17 to 1–18 defeat.

==== Senior ====
Turnbull was added to the Cork senior hurling team for their National Hurling League game against Limerick on 24 February 2019. He remained on the bench throughout and was not included on any of Cork's subsequent league or championship match-day panels.

On 20 December 2019, Turnbull made his first appearance for the Cork senior team when he was selected at left corner-forward for Cork's Munster League game against Kerry. He scored two points from play in the 1–27 to 0–11 victory. Turnbull subsequently made his National League debut on 16 February 2020 when he was introduced as a 60th-minute substitute for Jack O'Connor in a 3–12 to 1–14 defeat of Westmeath. He was later included on Cork's Munster Championship panel and made his debut as a 72nd-minute substitute for Séamus Harnedy in a 1–28 to 1–24 defeat by Waterford.

== Career statistics ==
=== Club ===
As of match played 17 September 2023.

Team	Year	Cork SHC	
Team	Year	Apps	Score
Douglas	2017	2	0-04
Douglas	2018	1	0-02
Douglas	2019	2	0-04
Douglas	Total	5	0-10
Douglas	Year	Cork PSHC	
Douglas	Year	Apps	Score
Douglas	2020	3	0-10
Douglas	2021	4	1-06
Douglas	2022	0	0-00
Douglas	2023	3	0-02
Douglas	Total	10	1-18
Career total		15	1-28

=== Inter-county ===
As of match played 23 May 2021.

Team	Year	National League			Munster		All-Ireland		Total	
Team	Year	Division	Apps	Score	Apps	Score	Apps	Score	Apps	Score
Cork Minor	2016	—			0	0-00	—		0	0-00
Cork Minor	2017	—			4	0-31	2	1-20	6	1-51
Cork Minor	Total	—			4	0-31	2	1-20	6	1-51
Cork U21	2018	—			—		1	0-01	1	0-01
Cork U21	Total	—			—		1	0-01	1	0-01
Cork U20	2019	—			3	0-10	2	0-10	5	0-20
Cork U20	Total	—			3	0-10	2	0-10	5	0-20
Cork	2019	Division 1A	0	0-00	—		—		0	0-00
Cork	2020	Division 1A	1	0-00	1	0-00	0	0-00	2	0-00
Cork	2021	Division 1A	1	0-02	0	0-00	0	0-00	1	0-02
Cork	Total		2	0-02	1	0-00	0	0-00	3	0-02
Career total			2	0-02	8	0-41	5	1-31	15	1-74

== Honours ==
=== Team ===
St. Francis College

- Dr. O'Callaghan Cup (1): 2015

Douglas

- Cork Premier Under-21 A Hurling Championship (1): 2016
- Cork Premier 1 Minor Hurling Championship (1): 2015

Cork

- Munster Minor Hurling Championship (1): 2017

=== Individual ===
Awards

- GAA Minor Star Hurler of the Year (1): 2017
- GAA Minor Star Hurling Team of the Year Award (1): 2017

Achievements
Preceded by New award	GAA Minor Star Hurler of the Year; 2017	Succeeded by Donal O'Shea
