= 2025 Leinster Senior Hurling Championship =

2022 hurling championship

Leinster Senior Hurling Championship
Tournament details
- Province: Leinster
- Year: 2025
- Trophy: Bob O'Keeffe Cup
- Date: 19 April – 8 June 2025
- Teams: 6
- Defending champions: Kilkenny

Winners
- Champions: Kilkenny (77th win)
- Manager: Derek Lyng
- Captain: John Donnelly
- Qualify for: Leinster SHC Final; All-Ireland SHC

Runners-up
- Runners-up: Galway
- Manager: Micheál Donoghue
- Captain: Conor Whelan

Promotion/Relegation
- Relegated team(s): Antrim

Other
- Matches played: 16
- Total scored: 66-654 (53.25 per game)
- Top Scorer: Lee Chin (3-56)
- Website: Leinster GAA

The 2025 Leinster Senior Hurling Championship was the 2025 installment of the annual Leinster Senior Hurling Championship organised by Leinster GAA. Kilkenny were the defending champions having defeated Dublin in the 2024 final. Kilkenny beat Galway in the final to clinch their sixth win in a row and 77th overall.

== Format ==
=== Group stage (15 matches) ===
Each team plays each other once. The 1st and 2nd placed teams advance to the Leinster final and the 3rd placed team advances to the All-Ireland preliminary quarter-finals. All other teams are eliminated from the championship and the bottom placed team will be relegated to next years Joe McDonagh Cup.

=== Final (1 match) ===
The top 2 teams in the group stage contest this game. The Leinster champions advance to the All-Ireland semi-finals and the Leinster runners-up advance to the All-Ireland quarter-finals.

== Team changes ==
=== To Championship ===
Promoted from the Joe McDonagh Cup

- Offaly

=== From Championship ===
Relegated to the Joe McDonagh Cup

- Carlow

== Teams ==
=== General Information ===
Six counties will compete in the Leinster Senior Hurling Championship:

County	Last Championship Title	Last All-Ireland Title	Position in 2024 Championship
Antrim	—	—	5th
Dublin	2013	1938	Runners-up
Galway	2018	2017	4th
Kilkenny	2024	2015	Champions
Offaly	1995	1998	Champions (Joe McDonagh Cup)
Wexford	2019	1996	3rd

=== Personnel and kits ===
County	Manager	Captain(s)	Sponsor
Antrim	Davy Fitzgerald	Conor McCann	Fibrus
Dublin	Niall Ó Ceallacháin	Paddy Smyth	Staycity
Galway	Micheál Donoghue	Conor Whelan	Supermac's
Kilkenny	Derek Lyng	Richie Reid and Eoin Cody	Avonmore
Offaly	Johnny Kelly	Jason Sampson	Glenisk
Wexford	Keith Rossiter	Lee Chin and Kevin Foley	Zurich Insurance Group

== Group stage ==
=== Table ===
Pos	Team	Pld	W	D	L	SF	SA	Diff	Pts	Qualification
1	Kilkenny (F)	5	4	0	1	15-113	9-89	+42	8	Advance to Leinster Final
2	Galway (F)	5	4	0	1	9-131	10-83	+45	8	Advance to Leinster Final
3	Dublin	5	3	0	2	13-112	11-105	+13	6	Advance to All-Ireland preliminary quarter-finals
4	Wexford (E)	5	3	0	2	12-95	6-106	+7	6	
5	Offaly (E)	5	1	0	4	9-81	10-108	-30	2	
6	Antrim (R)	5	0	0	5	4-80	16-121	-77	0	Relegation to Joe McDonagh Cup

- (F) qualified for Leinster final
- (E) eliminated from All-Ireland championship
- (R) relegated to Joe McDonagh Cup

=== Fixtures ===
==== Round 1 ====
19 April 2025 Round 1	Wexford	2-24 (30) - (19) 0-19	Antrim	Wexford
14:00	Lee Chin 0-16 (12 frees), Conor Hearne, Rory O’Connor 0-3 each, Kevin Foley, Cian Byrne 1-0 each, Cathal Dunbar, Seamus Casey 0-1 each	Report	James McNaughton 0-8 (6 frees), Gerard Walsh 0-4 (1 penalty, 2 frees), Keelan Molloy 0-3, Nigel Elliott, Seann Elliott, Joe McLaughlin, Eoin O’Neill 0-1 each	Stadium: Wexford Park; Attendance: 4,774; Referee: Colm Lyons (Cork)

19 April 2025 Round 1	Kilkenny	3-24 (33) - (21) 0-21	Galway	Kilkenny
15:45	Eoin Cody (1-5, 2fs), Martin Keoghan (1-2), Fionan Mackessy (0-4, 1f and 1 '65), Adrian Mullen (1-0), Jordan Molloy (0-3), Billy Ryan, Cian Kenny, Mikey Carey, Stephen Donnelly (0-2 each), John Donnelly, Luke Hogan (0-1 each)	Report	Cathal Mannion (0-10, 6fs), Cianan Fahy, John Fleming, Conor Cooney (0-2 each), Conor Whelan, Declan McLoughlin, Tiernan Killeen, TJ Brennan, Gavin Lee (0-1 each)	Stadium: Nowlan Park; Attendance: 8,243; Referee: Sean Stack (Dublin)

19 April 2025 Round 1	Dublin	1-25 (28) - (25) 2-19	Offaly	Dublin
18:00	Sean Currie 0-9 (5fs), Ronan Hayes 1-1, Donal Burke 0-4 (2fs, 1 65), Conor Donohoe 0-3, Brian Hayes 0-3, Conor Burke 0-2, Diarmaid O Dulaing 0-1, Chris Crummey 0-1, John Hetherton 0-1.	Report	Brian Duignan 0-8 (6fs), Killian Sampson 1-2, Dan Ravenhill 0-5 (3fs), Oisin Kelly 1-1, Charlie Mitchell 0-1, Ross Ravenhill 0-1, Dan Bourke 0-1.	Stadium: Parnell Park; Attendance: 5,394; Referee: Johnny Murphy (Limerick)

==== Round 2 ====
26 April 2025 Round 2	Dublin	3-26 (35) - (31) 4-19	Wexford	Dublin
16:30	Sean Currie (1-11, 0-08f, 1-00pen), John Hetherton (2-03), Cian O'Sullivan (0-03), Darragh Power (0-02), Brian Hayes (0-02), Paddy Dunleavy (0-01), Chris Crummey (0-01), Conor Donohoe (0-01), Ronan Hayes (0-01), Colin Currie (0-01)	Report	Lee Chin (1-07, 1-05f), Rory O'Connor (1-02), Cathal Dunbar (1-01); Cian Byrne (1-01), Kevin Foley (0-02), Simon Donohoe (0-02), Conor Hearne (0-02), Damien Reck (0-01), Richie Lawlor (0-01)	Stadium: Parnell Park; Attendance: 7,734; Referee: Michael Kennedy (Tipperary)

26 April 2025 Round 2	Offaly	1-14 (17) - (31) 2-25	Galway	Tullamore
18:30	Brian Duignan 0-5 (4fsf), Killian Sampson 1-1, Adam Screeney 0-3 (2fs), Charlie Mitchell 0-2, Dan Ravenhill 0-2 (0-1f), Oisín Kelly 0-1	Report	Cathal Mannion 2-8 (1-0 65, 3fs), Colm Molloy 0-5, Brian Concannon 0-3, TJ Brennan 0-3, Conor Whelan 0-2, David Burke 0-1, Tiernan Killeen 0-1, Cianán Fahy 0-1, John Fleming 0-1	Stadium: Glenisk O'Connor Park; Attendance: 10,073; Referee: James Owens (Wexford)

27 April 2025 Round 2	Antrim	2-12 (18) - (36) 2-30	Kilkenny	Belfast
14:00	J McNaughton 1-9 (0-9f), K Molloy 1-1, C Bohill 0-1, N Elliott 0-1	Report	E Cody 1-13 (1-9f), M Keoghan 1-2, S Donnelly 0-3, C Kenny 0-2, J Molloy 0-2, P Deegan 0-1, J Donnelly 0-1, F Mackessy 0-1 (1f), H Shine 0-1, B Ryan 0-1, T Walsh 0-1, M Butler 0-1, B Drennan 0-1	Stadium: Corrigan Park; Referee: S Hynes (Galway)

==== Round 3 ====
10 May 2025 Round 3	Galway	1-29 (32) - (22) 2-16	Wexford	Galway
15:15	C Mannion 0-17 (0-11f), C Cooney 1-0, B Concannon 0-2, G Lee 0-2, J Fleming 0-2, C Fahy 0-2, T Monaghan 0-2, C Molloy 0-1, S Linnane 0-1	Report	L Chin 0-12 (0-9f, 0-1 ’65), C Dunbar 1-0, C Byrne 1-0, J O’Connor 0-1, K Foley 0-1, C Hearne 0-1, R O’Connor 0-1	Stadium: Pearse Stadium; Referee: Thomas Walsh (Waterford)

10 May 2025 Round 3	Antrim	0-19 (19) - (34) 3-25	Dublin	Belfast
16:30	J McNaughton 0-10 (8f, 1 65); R McCambridge, J McLaughlin 0-2 (1f) each; C Boyd, C McKeown, E Campbell, N Elliott, G Walsh (1f) 0-1 each	Report	S Currie 0-12 (8f, 2 65s); C O'Sullivan 1-3; F Whitely 1-1; R Hayes 1-0; C Crummey 0-3; B Hayes, J Hetherton, C Burke, P Doyle, C McHugh, C Currie 0-1 each	Stadium: Corrigan Park; Referee: Liam Gordon (Galway)

10 May 2025 Round 3	Kilkenny	4-25 (37) - (22) 2-16	Offaly	Kilkenny
18:00	TJ Reid 2-9 (7f), J Donnelly, B Ryan 0-4 each, C Kenny (2f), S Donnelly 0-3 each, M Keoghan, A Mullen 1-0 each, H Shine, F Mackessy 0-1 each	Report	B Duignan 0-8f, O Kelly 2-1, C Mitchell 0-3, D Bourke, D Shirley 0-2 each	Stadium: Nowlan Park; Attendance: 5,225; Referee: Colm McDonald (Antrim)

==== Round 4 ====
17 May 2025 Round 4	Galway	6-27 (45) - (17) 1-14	Antrim	Galway
13:30	Galway: C Cooney 0-11 (0-9f), A Burns 2-2, B Concannon 2-0, T Monaghan 0-6, K Cooney 1-1, D McLoughlin 1-1, C Whelan, R Glennon 0-2 each, D Morrissey, S Linnane 0-1 each	Report	J McLaughlin 0-7 (0-6f), N McGarrell 1-0, G Walsh 0-3 (0-3f), E O’Neill 0-2, N O’Connor, C McKeown 0-1 each	Stadium: Pearse Stadium; Referee: Thomas Gleeson (Dublin)

17 May 2025 Round 4	Wexford	2-17 (23) - (20) 1-17	Offaly	Wexford
17:00	Lee Chin 1-8 (6fs, 1 65), Kevin Foley 1-1, Cian Byrne 0-2, Conor Hearne, Cian Molloy, Jack O’Connor, Cathal Dunbar, Rory O’Connor, Conor McDonald 0-1 each	Report	Brian Duignan 1-9 (9fs), Dan Ravenhill 0-3 (2fs), Killian Sampson 0-2, Ross Ravenhill, Daniel Bourke, Donal Shirley 0-1 each	Stadium: Wexford Park; Attendance: 3,722; Referee: Shane Hynes (Galway)

18 May 2025 Round 4	Kilkenny	5-19 (34) - (30) 3-21	Dublin	Kilkenny
15:00	TJ Reid 1-9 (9f), B Ryan 2-3, M Keoghan 1-2, A Mullen 1-1, S Donnelly, K Doyle, J Molloy, L Hogan 0-1 each	Report	S Currie 2-6 (1-4f, 0-1 ‘65), C O’Sullivan 1-5, C Donohoe 0-4, AJ Murphy 0-2, D Power, R McBride, C Crummey, F Whitely 0-1 each	Stadium: Nowlan Park; Attendance: 8,001; Referee: Michael Kennedy (Tipperary)

==== Round 5 ====
25 May 2025 Round 5	Wexford	2-19 (25) - 1-15 (18)	Kilkenny	Wexford
14:00	Wexford: L Chin 1-13 (0-9f), R O’Connor 1-1, J O’Connor, M Dwyer, S Donohoe, C Hearne, C McDonald all 0-1	Report	TJ Reid 1-4 (0-2f, 0-2 ‘65), J Donnelly 0-3, L Connellan 0-2, B Drennan, K Doyle, S Donnelly, A Mullen, R Reid, R Mackessy all 0-1	Stadium: Wexford Park; Attendance: 4,623; Referee: Seán Stack (Dublin)

25 May 2025 Round 5	Dublin	3-15 (24) - (29) 0-29	Galway	Dublin
14:00				Stadium: Parnell Park; Attendance: ~8,200; Referee: Colm Lyons (Cork)

25 May 2025 Round 5	Offaly	3-15 (24) - (19) 1-16	Antrim	Tullamore
14:00				Stadium: Glenisk O'Connor Park; Attendance: ~4,000; Referee: Michael Kennedy (Tipperary)

== Leinster Final ==
8 June 2025
16:00
Leinster Final

Kilkenny	3-22 (31) – (23) 1-20	Galway
	Report

Croke Park
Attendance: 37,503
Referee: Johnny Murphy
Man of the match: Huw Lawlor

== Stadia and Locations ==
Locations of the 2025 Leinster SHC teams.

County	Location	Province	Stadium	Capacity
Neutral venue	Dublin	Leinster	Croke Park	82,300
Antrim	Belfast	Ulster	Corrigan Park	3,700
Dublin	Donnycarney	Leinster	Parnell Park	8,500
Galway	Galway	Connacht	Pearse Stadium	26,197
Kilkenny	Kilkenny	Leinster	Nowlan Park	27,000
Offaly	Tullamore	Leinster	Glenisk O'Connor Park	20,000
Wexford	Wexford	Leinster	Chadwicks Wexford Park	18,000

== Statistics ==
=== Top Scorers ===
==== Top Scorer Overall ====
Rank	Player	County	Tally	Total	Matches	Average
1	Lee Chin	Wexford	3-56	65	5	13
2	Cathal Mannion	Galway	2-54	60	5	12
3	Seán Currie	Dublin	4-44	56	5	11.20
4	Brian Duignan	Offaly	2-37	43	5	8.6
5	James McNaughton	Antrim	2-35	41	4	10.25
6	TJ Reid	Kilkenny	5-26	41	4	10.25
7	Martin Keoghan	Kilkenny	6-08	26	5	4.50
8	Eoin Cody	Kilkenny	2-18	24	2	12.00
9	Cian O'Sullivan	Dublin	2-14	20	5	4
10	Billy Ryan	Kilkenny	2-13	19	5	3.80

==== In A Single Game ====
Rank	Player	County	Tally	Total	Opposition
1	Cathal Mannion	Galway	0-17	17	Wexford
2	Lee Chin	Wexford	0-16	16	Antrim
2	Eoin Cody	Kilkenny	1-13	16	Antrim
2	Lee Chin	Wexford	1-13	16	Kilkenny
4	TJ Reid	Kilkenny	2-09	15	Offaly
5	Seán Currie	Dublin	1-11	14	Wexford
5	Cathal Mannion	Galway	2-08	14	Offaly
7	James McNaughton	Antrim	1-09	12	Kilkenny
7	Seán Currie	Dublin	0-12	12	Antrim
7	Lee Chin	Wexford	0-12	12	Galway
7	Brian Duignan	Offaly	1-09	12	Wexford
7	TJ Reid	Kilkenny	1-09	12	Dublin
7	Seán Currie	Dublin	2-06	12	Kilkenny

=== Scoring events ===
- Widest winning margin: 28 points
  - Galway 6-27 - 1-14 Antrim (Round 4)
- Most goals in a match: 8
  - Kilkenny 5-19 - 3-21 Dublin (Round 4)
- Most points in a match: 45
  - Kilkenny 3-24 - 0-21 Galway (Round 1)
  - Dublin 3-26 - 4-19 Wexford (Round 2)
  - Galway 1-29 - 2-16 Wexford (Round 3)
- Most goals by one team in a match: 6
  - Galway 6-27 - 1-14 Antrim (Round 4)
- Most points by one team in a match: 30
  - Antrim 2-12 - 2-30 Kilkenny (Round 2)
- Highest aggregate score: 66 points
  - Dublin 3-26 - 4-19 Wexford (Round 2)
- Lowest aggregate score: 43 points
  - Wexford 2-17 - 1-17 Offaly (Round 4)
  - Wexford 2-19 - 1-15 Kilkenny (Round 5)
  - Offaly 3-15 - 1-16 Antrim (Round 5)

== See also ==
- 2025 All-Ireland Senior Hurling Championship
- 2025 Munster Senior Hurling Championship
- 2025 Joe McDonagh Cup (Tier 2)
- 2025 Christy Ring Cup (Tier 3)
- 2025 Nicky Rackard Cup (Tier 4)
- 2025 Lory Meagher Cup (Tier 5)
