= Seán O'Leary-Hayes =

Irish hurler

Personal information
- Native name: Seán Ó Laoire-Ó hAodha (Irish)
- Born: 16 July 1999 (age 27) Midleton, County Cork, Ireland
- Occupation: Engineer
- Height: 5 ft 11 in (180 cm)

Sport
- Sport: Hurling
- Position: Full-back
Clubs
- Years: Club
- 2017-2024 2023-present: Midleton; Westmeath NY
Club titles
- Cork titles: 1
College(s)
- Years: College
- 2018-2021 2021-2022: Cork Institute of Technology; Trinity College, Dublin
College titles
- Fitzgibbon titles: 0
Inter-county
- Years: County
- 2019-2021 2025-present: Cork; New York
Inter-county titles
- Munster titles: 0
- All-Irelands: 0
- NHL: 0
- All Stars: 0

Seán O'Leary-Hayes (born 16 July 1999) is an Irish hurler. At club level, he plays with Westmeath New York and at inter-county level with the New York senior hurling team. O'Leary-Hayes previously played with Midleton and Cork.

== Career ==
O'Leary-Hayes was educated at Midleton CBS Secondary School and played in all grades of hurling during his time there. He won a Dean Ryan Cup medal in 2015, after a one-point win over Our Lady's Secondary School in the final. O'Leary-Hayes later won back-to-back Dr O'Callaghan Cup titles in 2017 and 2018.

As a student at the Cork Institute of Technology, O'Leary-Hayes lined out in the Fitzgibbon Cup. He later received a scholarship to Trinity College and also lined out with them in the Fitzgibbon Cup.

O'Leary-Hayes first played for Midleton at juvenile and underage levels before making his senior team debut in June 2017. He won a Cork PSHC medal in November 2021, after lining out at corner-back in the 0–24 to 1–18 win over Glen Rovers. O'Leary-Hayes later played with the Westmeath New York team before officially transferring in 2024. He won a New York SHC medal in 2025, following a 3–22 to 3–18 win over Hoboken in the final.

At inter-county level, O'Leary-Hayes first played for Cork during a two-year tenure with the minor team. He captained the team to a 2–17 to 2–15 defeat by Galway in the 2018 All-Ireland MHC final. He was later named in the full-back position on the inaugural Minor Star Awards Hurling Team of the Year. O'Leary-Hayes later progressed to the under-20 team and was at centre-back for the 5–17 to 1–18 defeat by Tipperary in the 2019 All-Ireland U20HC final.

O'Leary-Hayes made his senior team debut in January 2019. He came on as a substitute for Niall O'Leary in the 3–32 to 1–22 defeat by Limerick in the 2021 All-Ireland SHC final. O'Leary-Hayes continued to play with Cork until 2023, but later joined the New York team. He won a Lory Meagher Cup medal in 2025, after a 4–17 to 2–17 win over Cavan in the final. O'Leary-Hayes was also part of the New York team that won the Nicky Rackard Cup in 2026.

== Honours ==
Midleton CBS

- Dean Ryan Cup (1): 2015

Midleton

- Cork Premier Senior Hurling Championship (1): 2021

Westmeath New York

- New York Senior Hurling Championship (1): 2025

Cork

- Munster Under-20 Hurling Championship (1): 2019
- Munster Minor Hurling Championship (1): 2017 (c)

New York

- Nicky Rackard Cup (1): 2026
- Lory Meagher Cup (1): 2025

Sporting positions
Preceded by Niall O'Leary	Cork minor hurling team captain 2017	Succeeded by Shane Barrett
