= Seán Bleahene =

Irish hurler

Personal information
- Native name: Seán Ó Blichín (Irish)
- Born: 1999 (age 26–27) Kilconnell, County Galway, Ireland
- Occupation: Student

Sport
- Sport: Hurling
- Position: Right corner-forward
Club
- Years: Club
- Ahascragh-Fohenagh
Club titles
- Galway titles: 0
College
- Years: College
- Galway-Mayo Institute of Technology
Inter-county*
Years	County	Apps (scores)
2019-	Galway	0 (0-00)
Inter-county titles
- Leinster titles: 0
- All-Irelands: 0
- NHL: 0
- All Stars: 0
- *Inter County team apps and scores correct as of 19:41, 19 March 2019.

Seán Bleahene (born 1999) is an Irish hurler who plays for Galway Senior Championship club Ahascragh-Fohenagh and at inter-county level with the Galway senior hurling team. He usually lines out as a right corner-forward.

== Honours ==
Galway

- Leinster Under-21 Hurling Championship (1): 2018
- All-Ireland Minor Hurling Championship (1): 2017

== Career statistics ==
As of match played 16 March 2019.

Team	Year	National League			Leinster		All-Ireland		Total	
Team	Year	Division	Apps	Score	Apps	Score	Apps	Score	Apps	Score
Galway	2019	Division 1B	5	0-04	0	0-00	0	0-00	5	0-04
Total			5	0-04	0	0-00	0	0-00	5	0-04
