= Jack O'Connor (Cork hurler) =

Irish hurler (born 1998)

Personal information
- Native name: Seán Ó Conchúir (Irish)
- Born: 1 October 1998 (age 28) Glanmire, County Cork, Ireland
- Occupation: Bank official
- Height: 6 ft 0 in (183 cm)

Sport
- Sport: Hurling
- Position: Right corner-forward
Club*
Years	Club	Apps (scores)
2016-present	Sarsfields	48 (12-125)
Club titles
- Cork titles: 2
- Munster titles: 1
- All-Ireland Titles: 0
College
- Years: College
- 2018-2023: University College Cork
College titles
- Fitzgibbon titles: 0
Inter-county**
Years	County	Apps (scores)
2018-present	Cork	21 (2-15)
Inter-county titles
- Munster titles: 2
- All-Irelands: 0
- NHL: 1
- All Stars: 0
- * club appearances and scores correct as of 21:03, 20 January 2026. **Inter County team apps and scores correct as of 22:42, 8 July 2025.

Jack O'Connor (born 1 October 1998) is an Irish hurler. At club level, he plays with Sarsfields and at inter-county level with the Cork senior hurling team. O'Connor usually lines out as a corner-forward.

== Early life ==
Born and raised in Glanmire, County Cork, O'Connor played hurling and Gaelic football as a student at Glanmire Community College. He later studied at University College Cork and was included on their Fitzgibbon Cup panel.

== Club career ==
O'Connor began his club career at juvenile and underage levels with the Sarsfields club in Glanmire. He won a Premier 1 MHC title in 2014 after a 3–12 to 2–14 defeat of amalgamation side Killeagh/Ita's in a final replay. O'Connor progressed to the club's under-21 team and won Premier U21HC medals in 2017 and 2019, after defeats of Killeagh/Ita's and Blackrock respectively.

O'Connor was just 17-year-old when he made his senior team debut in May 2016. He claimed his first senior silverware in October 2023 when Sarsfields beat Midleton by 0–21 to 0–19 to win the Cork PSHC title. In spite of losing their title to Imokilly a year later, Sarsfields were the Cork representatives for the subsequent provincial series of games and O'Connor added a Munster Club SHC title to his collection after a 3–20 to 2–19 win over Ballygunner in the final. He scored five points from play in the 2–23 to 0–20 defeat by Na Fianna in the 2025 All-Ireland club final.

== Inter-county career ==
O'Connor first played for Cork at minor level in 2016, however, his sole season in the grade ended with a defeat by Tipperary in the Munster semi-final. He immediately progressed to the under-21 grade and won a Munster U21HC medal in July 2018 after scoring 1-02 from play in Cork's 2–23 to 1–13 defeat of Tipperary in the final. His last game in the grade was a 3–13 to 1–16 defeat by Tipperary in the 2018 All-Ireland final.

O'Connor made his senior team debut as a substitute for Alan Cadogan in a National League game against Kilkenny in January 2018. He made a number of appearances that season and claimed a Munster SHC medal as a substitute in Cork's 2–24 to 3–19 defeat of Clare in the final. O'Connor was at corner-forward when Cork suffered a 3–32 to 1–22 defeat by Limerick in the 2021 All-Ireland final. He came on as a substitute for Conor Lehane when Cork lost the 2022 National League final to Waterford.

O'Connor came on as a substitute for Alan Connolly at full-forward for Cork's 3–29 to 1–34 extra-time defeat by Clare in the 2024 All-Ireland final. He claimed his first national silverware, this time as an unused substitute, in April 2025 when Cork won the National Hurling League title following a 3–24 to 0–23 win over Tipperary in the final. This was later followed by a second Munster SHC medal after Cork's penalty shootout defeat of Limerick in the 2025 Munster final.

== Career statistics ==
=== Club ===
As of 16 November 2025

Team	Season	Cork		Munster		All-Ireland		Total	
Team	Season	Apps	Score	Apps	Score	Apps	Score	Apps	Score
Sarsfields	2016	2	0-01	—		—		2	0-01
Sarsfields	2017	7	3-15	—		—		7	3-15
Sarsfields	2018	2	1-03	—		—		2	1-03
Sarsfields	2019	3	0-10	—		—		3	0-10
Sarsfields	2020	4	3-08	—		—		4	3-08
Sarsfields	2021	4	1-08	—		—		4	1-08
Sarsfields	2022	3	1-09	—		—		3	1-09
Sarsfields	2023	6	1-11	1	0-00	—		7	1-11
Sarsfields	2024	5	0-18	2	1-06	2	0-09	9	1-33
Sarsfields	2025	6	1-27	1	0-00	—		7	1-27
Career total		42	11-110	4	1-06	2	0-09	48	12-125

=== Inter-county ===
As of 5 July 2025

Team	Year	National League			Munster		All-Ireland		Total	
Team	Year	Division	Apps	Score	Apps	Score	Apps	Score	Apps	Score
Cork	2018	Division 1A	4	0-01	1	0-00	1	0-01	6	0-02
Cork	2019	Division 1A	3	1-00	1	0-00	0	0-00	4	1-00
Cork	2020	Division 1A	1	0-00	1	0-00	2	0-01	4	0-01
Cork	2021	Division 1A	4	4-03	1	0-03	4	2-07	9	6-13
Cork	2022	Division 1A	7	0-01	3	0-02	2	0-00	12	0-03
Cork	2023	Division 1A	3	0-03	0	0-00	—		3	0-03
Cork	2024	Division 1A	3	1-04	2	0-00	2	0-00	7	1-04
Cork	2025	Division 1A	3	0-01	0	0-00	1	0-01	4	0-02
Total			28	6-13	9	0-05	12	2-10	49	8-28

== Honours ==
Sarsfields

- Munster Senior Club Hurling Championship: 2024
- Cork Premier Senior Hurling Championship: 2023, 2025
- Cork Premier Under-21 A Hurling Championship: 2017, 2019
- Rebel Óg Premier 1 Minor Hurling Championship: 2014

Cork

- Munster Senior Hurling Championship: 2018, 2025
- National Hurling League: 2025
- Munster Under-21 Hurling Championship: 2018
