= Marjorie Carroll =

Canadian politician (1932–2020)

Mayor of Waterloo, Ontario
- In office 1977–1988
- Preceded by: Herb Epp
- Succeeded by: Brian Turnbull

Personal details
- Born: October 8, 1932 Bruce County, Ontario
- Died: October 24, 2020 (aged 88)
- Education: University of Western Ontario

Marjorie Carroll (née Monk) was a former nurse and politician in Ontario, Canada. She served as the first female, and longest-serving mayor of Waterloo from 1977 to 1988.

== Biography ==
Carroll was born October 8, 1932, in Bruce County, Ontario. She grew up on a farm near Elmwood, Ontario. She was educated at the Kitchener-Waterloo School of Nursing and studied public health nursing at the University of Western Ontario. She worked as a nurse in Toronto, where she met her husband, Glenn Carroll, with whom she had two daughters.

Carroll worked on campaigns for the federal and provincial Progressive Conservatives. She was elected to Waterloo city council in 1974. She was appointed mayor in 1977 by the council after Herb Epp resigned to enter provincial politics. She was elected by acclamation three more times. Carroll lost to Brian Turnbull when she ran for reelection in 1988. Carroll's 11-year term marks her as the city's longest-serving mayor.

Following her political career, Carroll consulted with Waterloo Management Education Centre assisting clients with the development of human resources planning. She also served as chair of the Kitchener-Waterloo Hospital Foundation from 1989 until 1992.

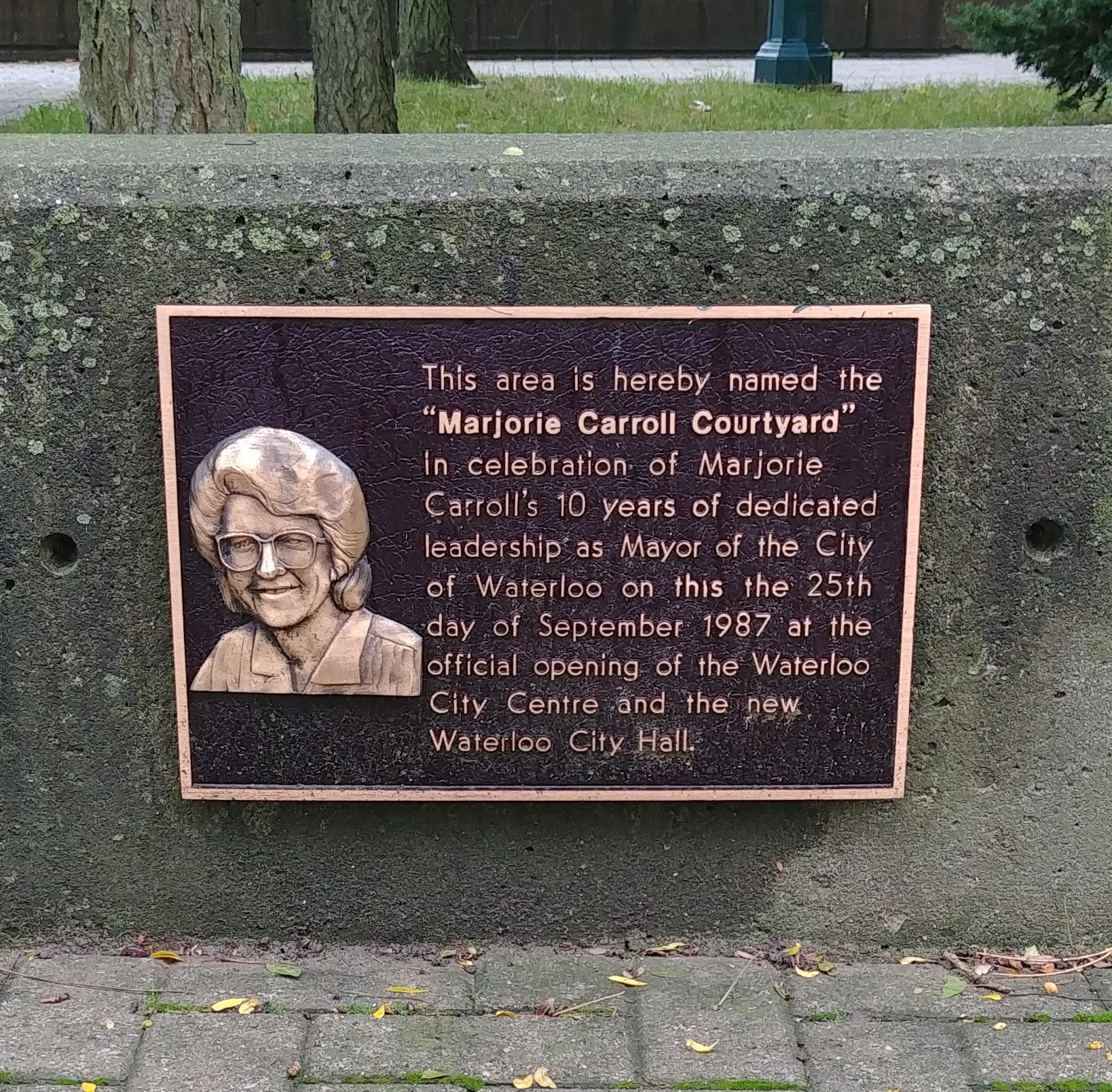
Marjorie Carroll Courtyard plaque

Carroll died on October 24, 2020, in Waterloo, Ontario.

== Honours ==
A courtyard outside of Waterloo City Centre was dedicated in her honour on September 25, 1987. In 2004, the birthing centre at the Grand River Hospital was renamed the Marjorie Carroll Childbirth Centre. A nursing lecture hall at Conestoga College was also named in her honour. She was awarded the Queen Elizabeth II Diamond Jubilee Medal in 2013.
