= Abhinay Muthoo =

Abhinay Muthoo is a British economist who is currently a Research Lead and Fellow at the National Institute of Economic and Social Research (NIESR), a visiting professor at the Meghnad Desai Academy of Economics (MDAE), and Lead Academic of the UK Cross Parliamentary Party Youth Violence Commission.

He has broad interests, including in negotiations, game theory and public policy.

He was educated at the London School of Economics and the University of Cambridge. His academic journey spans over 39 years of teaching and research across several prestigious universities including Cambridge, LSE, Harvard, Bristol, Warwick, Essex, Paris, Delhi, and Mumbai. He has held a full professorship in economics for over 26 years and has published extensively in top economics journals.

In addition to his academic roles, he has over 20 years of leadership and management experience. He served as the Head of the Departments of Economics at the Universities of Warwick and Essex for a combined 15 years, the Dean of Warwick in London for four years, and the Dean of the Meghnad Desai Academy of Economics.

== Education ==
He studied for a BSc in economics at the London School of Economics which he obtained with First Class Honours, before proceeding to obtain his MPhil and PhD in economics at the University of Cambridge, where he was supervised by David Canning and Partha Dasgupta, and his doctoral thesis were examined by Kenneth Binmore and Frank Hahn.

== Academic career ==
Abhinay was a Professor of Economics at the University of Warwick between 2008 and 2022. During that period, he was the Head of Department of Economics for eight years (2008-2016) and the Dean of Warwick in London for four years (2016-2020). Prior to that, he was a professor at the University of Essex and held positions at Harvard University, London School of Economics, Panthéon-Assas University, University of Bristol and the University of Cambridge. He was the Head of the Department of Economics at the University of Essex for seven years.

== Research ==
Muthoo's research interests include art and science of negotiations, Conflict, Dispute Resolution, Game Theory, Bargaining, Law and Economics, Political Institutions, Political Economy, Coalition Formation, Foundations of Social Order, Family, International Development, International Relations, Public Policy, Higher Education, Economics and Literature, and Political Philosophy.

He authored the book Bargaining Theory with Applications.

He also publicly commented on capitalism, university leadership and immigration rules.
