= Albert Canning =

Albert Canning may refer to:

- Albert Canning (British Army officer) (1860–1961), English army officer
- Albert Canning (police officer) (1885–1969), English police officer
