= Jack Canning =

Irish hurler

Personal information
- Native name: Seán Ó Cainin (Irish)
- Born: 1999 (age 26–27) Portumna, County Galway, Ireland
- Height: 6 ft 3 in (191 cm)

Sport
- Sport: Hurling
- Position: Left corner-forward
Club
- Years: Club
- 2020-present: Portumna
Club titles
- Galway titles: 0
Inter-county*
Years	County	Apps (scores)
2021	Galway	0 (0-00)
Inter-county titles
- Leinster titles: 0
- All-Irelands: 0
- NHL: 0
- All Stars: 0
- *Inter County team apps and scores correct as of 22:31, 12 January 2021.

Jack Canning (born 1999) is an Irish hurler. At club level he plays with Portumna, while he has also lined out at inter-county level with the Galway senior hurling team.

== Career ==
Canning played a number of sports as a student at the Cistercian College in Roscrea. He was part of the college's rugby union team that won the Leinster Senior Cup after beating Belvedere College in 2015. Canning began his club hurling career at juvenile and underage levels with Portumna, before making his senior team debut in 2017.

On the inter-county scene, Canning first appeared for Galway during a two-year tenure with the minor team. He scored 2-02 and was man of the match when Galway defeated Cork in the 2017 All-Ireland minor final. He was later named on the minor team of the year. Canning immediately progressed to the under-21 team and won a Leinster U21HC title in 2018.

Canning put his hurling career on hold when he joined Northern Suburbs Rugby Club in Sydney in January 2018. He returned after a year and resumed his club career with Portumna. Canning was drafted onto the Galway senior hurling team in January 2021.

== Personal life ==
His uncles, Ollie and Joe Canning also lined out with Galway.

== Honours ==
Cistercian College

- Leinster Schools Rugby Senior Cup: 2015

Galway

- Leinster Under-21 Hurling Championship: 2018
- All-Ireland Minor Hurling Championship: 2017

Awards

- GAA Minor Star Hurling Team of the Year Award: 2017
- All-Ireland Minor Hurling Final Man of the Match: 2017
