= 2017 All-Ireland Minor Hurling Championship =

All-Ireland Minor Hurling Championship 2017
Championship Details
- Dates: 5 April 2017 – 3 September 2017
- Teams: 20

All Ireland Champions
- Winners: Galway (11th win)
- Captain: Darren Morrissey
- Manager: Jeffrey Lynskey

All Ireland Runners-up
- Runners-up: Cork
- Captain: Seán O'Leary-Hayes
- Manager: Denis Ring

Provincial Champions
- Munster: Cork
- Leinster: Kilkenny
- Ulster: Antrim
- Connacht: Not Played

Championship Statistics
- Matches Played: 30
- Total Goals: 87 (2.9 per game)
- Total Points: 933 (31.1 per game)
- Top Scorer: Brian Turnbull (1-51)

The 2017 All-Ireland Minor Hurling Championship was the 87th staging of the All-Ireland hurling championship since its establishment by the Gaelic Athletic Association in 1928. It is the primary inter-county hurling championship for boys under the age of eighteen. The championship began on 5 April 2017 and ended on 3 September 2017.

Tipperary entered the championship as the defending champions, however, they were defeated by Cork in a Munster semi-final replay.

On 3 September 2017 Galway won the championship following a 2-17 to 2-15 defeat of Cork in the All-Ireland final. This was their 11th All-Ireland title and their first in two championship seasons.

== Participating teams ==
Team	Colours	Most recent success
Team	Colours	All-Ireland	Provincial
Antrim			2016
Armagh
Carlow
Clare		1997	2011
Cork		2001	2008
Donegal
Down			2012
Dublin		1965	2016
Galway		2015
Kildare
Kilkenny		2014	2015
Laois			1964
Limerick		1984	2014
Meath			1929
Offaly		1989	2000
Tipperary		2016	2016
Waterford		2013	2009
Westmeath
Wicklow
Wexford		1968	1985

== Provincial Championships ==
=== Leinster Minor Hurling Championship ===
First round

8 April 2017 First round	Westmeath	0-4 - 3-22	Kilkenny	TEG Cusack Park, Mullingar
12:00	S Broughan 0-4.		A Mullen 0-12, N Brennan 1-2, S Ryan 1-2, T Drea 1-0, E O'Shea 0-2, D Barron 0-1, N Brassil 0-1, B Staunton 0-1, R Connolly 0-1.

8 April 2017 First round	Laois	2-22 - 0-14	Offaly	O'Connor Park, Tullamore
15:00	O Bennett 1-6 (0-6f), C Comerford 0-6, J Phelan 1-0, J Keyes 0-3, P Delaney 0-3f, PJ Daly 0-1, D Comerford 0-1, L Senior 0-1, B McGinley 0-1.		A Kenny 0-4f, D Nally 0-3, O Hickey 0-2, C Langton 0-1, J Keenaghan 0-1, L Kavanagh 0-1, A Maher 0-1 S O’Toole 0-1

8 April 2017 First round	Kildare	3-17 - 1-15	Carlow	St. Conleth's Park, Newbridge
15:00	C Tobin 0-10, B Tobin 2-0, S Cullen 1-2, K Aherne 0-2, J Dolan 0-1, L Conroy 0-1, L O'Flynn 0-1.		J O'Neill 1-6, J Nolan 0-9.

8 April 2017 First round	Meath	4-28 - 0-13	Wicklow	St. Loman's Park, Trim
15:00	J Ryan 2-4, M Mullen 0-10, J Leavy 1-1, E Fitzgerald 0-4, D Hennessy 1-0, B Kelly 0-2, B Dowling 0-2, A Murphy 0-2, D Gilmartin 0-1, N Potterton 0-1, M Farrell 0-1.		J O'Neill 0-6, P O'Toole 0-3, G Hughes 0-2, I Clancy 0-1, P McGing 0-1.

Second round

15 April 2017 Second round	Dublin	1-11 - 1-8	Laois	Parnell Park, Donnycarney
15:00	S Currie 0-8, K Desmond 1-0, L Murphy, J Byrne and E O’Neill 0-1 each.	Report	O Bennett 1-6 (3 frees), J Keyes and P Delaney 0-1 each.

15 April 2017 Second round	Kilkenny	1-20 - 0-11	Wexford	Nowlan Park, Kilkenny
15:00	A Mullen (1-9, 0-6 frees, 0-1 65); J Kelly (0-3); N Brassil (0-2, 0-1 free); E O'Shea (0-2); C Heary, N Brennan, S Ryan, T Drea (0-1 each).	Report	R Banville (0-8, frees); C Turner, S Wall, K Firman (0-1 each).

15 April 2017 Second round	Kildare	1-9 - 1-15	Offaly	St. Conleth's Park, Newbridge
15:00	C Tobin 1-7 (1-5f, 1'65), K Aherne and D Doyle 0-1 each.	Report	J Keenaghan 1-4, A Kenny 0-4(3f), D Nally 0-3, C Quinn and O Hickey 0-2 each.

15 April 2017 Second round	Meath	2-18 - 0-6	Westmeath	Killegland West, Ashbourne
15:00	M Mullen (1-11 five frees, two '65s'), N Potterton (1-3), E Fitzgerald (0-2), J Leavy (0-1); B Dowling (0-1).	Report	S Broughan (0-4 three frees, one '65'), K Carey (0-1), F Heeney (0-1).	Referee: G McGrath (Wexford)

Quarter-finals

29 April 2017 Quarter-final	Laois	1-19 - 1-14	Meath	O'Moore Park, Portlaoise
15:00	C Comerford 1-7, O Bennett 0-3f, J Keyes 0-2, C Duggan, J McCormack, J Phelan, D Comerford, E Gaughan, P Delaney, PJ Daly 0-1 each.	Report	M Mullen 0-8 (7f, 1 '65), B Dowling 1-0, A Murphy, J Ryan 0-2 each, E Fitzgerald, N Potterton 0-1 each.	Referee: M Murtagh (Westmeath)

29 April 2017 Quarter-final	Wexford	2-17 - 1-13	Offaly	Innovate Wexford Park, Wexford
15:00	R Banville 0-9 (7f, 1 '65), J Devereux 1-3, C McGuckin 1-1, S Nolan 0-3, S Wall 0-1.	Report	A Kenny 0-6 (4f), J Kenaghan 1-2, D Nally, M O'Brien 0-2 each, A Maher 0-1.	Referee: G Quilty (Kilkenny)

Semi-finals

13 May 2017 Semi-final	Laois	0-9 - 6-21	Kilkenny	O'Moore Park, Portlaoise
	O Bennett 0-6 (all frees), D Comerford, J Keyes and C Comerford 0-1 each.	Report	A Mullen 1-8 (0-3 frees), N Brassil 1-3, J Roberts 1-2, J Dowd 1-2, S Ryan 1-2, D Barron 1-1, J Ryan 0-2, E O’Shea 0-1.

13 May 2017 Semi-final	Dublin	0-20 - 1-14	Wexford	Parnell Park, Donnycarney
	S Currie 0-12 (0-0-8f), L Murphy 0-4, D Ó Floinn and M Grogan 0-2 each.	Report	R Banville 0-11 (0-11f), J Cullen 1-1, C McGuckin 0-2.

Final

2 July 2017 Final	Kilkenny	3-15 - 1-17	Dublin	Croke Park, Dublin
	A Mullen 1-9 (0-4f, 0-1 65), S Ryan 2-2, N Brasil, C Heary, E O’Shea and J Ryan 0-1 each.	Report	S Currie 0-8 (0-6f, 0-1 65), D Keogh 0-5 (0-2f), L Murphy 0-3, D O Floinn 0-1.

=== Munster Minor Hurling Championship ===
Quarter-finals

5 April 2017 Quarter-final	Clare	1-24 - 0-9	Waterford	Cusack Park, Ennis
18:15	K White (0-6), C Haugh (1-1), L Brack (0-4) 2 f’s, G Cooney (0-3), D Ryan, C Darcy, C Tierney, T Agnew (0-2) each, R Considine, G Cahill (0-1) each.	Report	B Power (0-5) 2 f’s 1 ’65, I Daly, I Beecher, S Crotty, T Douglas (0-1) each.	Attendance: 1,622; Referee: J Mullins (Limerick)

5 April 2017 Quarter-final	Tipperary	4-15 - 2-18	Limerick	Semple Stadium, Thurles
19:00	C McCarthy 1-3, A McKelvey 0-5 (4f), A Ormond 1-1, W Barry & N Hoctor 1-0 each, C Bowe & J Morris 0-2 each, K Breen & C Bourke 0-1 each.	Report	P O’Brien 0-11 (7f, 1 65), D O’Shea 2-2, D Woulfe 0-3, D Minehan & R Connolly 0-1 each.	Attendance: 2,567; Referee: N Wall (Cork)

Play-offs

3 May 2017 Play-off	Cork	1-24 - 0-8	Waterford	Páirc Uí Rinn, Cork
	B Turnbull 0-10 (3fs); B Roche 1-0; D Connery (3fs), C Hanafin, L O’Shea 0-3 each; E Sheehan 0-2, C O’Callaghan, B Murphy, J Geary 0-1 each.	Report	B Power 0-5 (5fs); I Daly (f), T Douglas (f), T Looby 0-1 each.	Referee: P Kelly (Tipperary)

11 May 2017 Play-off	Limerick	0-19 - 1-7	Waterford	Gaelic Grounds, Limerick
19:00	P O’Brien 0-10 (8fs, 1 65’), D O’Shea 0-3, D Woulfe, R Connolly 0-2 each, D Minehan, R Duff 0-1 each.	Report	B Power 0-5 (4fs), T Douglas 1-0 (1-0 pen), I Daly, I Beecher 0-1 each.	Referee: J McCormack (Tipperary)

Semi-finals

28 June 2017 Semi-final	Clare	0-19 - 0-17 (aet)	Limerick	Cusack Park, Ennis
19:30	T Agnew 0-10 (7f, 1’65); G Cooney 0-4; B Horner, D Ryan, K White, G Cahill, A McCarthy 0-1 each.	Report	P O’Brien 0-9 (4f, 1’65); D Woulfe 0-4; R Connolly, D Minehan, D O’Shea, M O’Brien 0-1 each.	Attendance: 3,697; Referee: P Kelly (Tipperary)

29 June 2017 Semi-final	Tipperary	2-18 - 1-21 (aet)	Cork	Semple Stadium, Thurles
19:30	A McKelvey 0-8 (7f), D Woods 1-4 (0-2f), R McCormack 1-0, P Cadell 0-3, J Morris 0-2, W Barry 0-1.	Report	B Turnbull 0-9 (5f), D Connery 0-7 (5f), E Sheehan 1-0f, R Downey 0-2, D Linehan, L O’Shea and D Hanlon 0-1 each.	Attendance: 4,254; Referee: R McGann (Clare)

3 July 2017 Semi-final replay	Cork	2-22 - 2-19	Tipperary	Páirc Uí Rinn, Cork
19:30	B Turnbull 0-8 (4f), C Hanafin 1-4, D Connery 0-6 (0-2f, 0-1 sl), L O’Shea 1-0, R Downey 0-2, S O’Leary-Hayes & E Sheehan 0-1 each.	Report	D Woods 0-6 (5f), J Morris 0-5, A McKelvey 0-4f, C Bourke & K McCarthy 1-0 each, C Bowe 0-3, N Hoctor 0-1.	Attendance: 8,142; Referee: J Murphy (Limerick)

Final

9 July 2017 Final	Clare	0-16 - 4-21	Cork	Semple Stadium, Thurles
14:00	T Agnew 0-7 (0-6f), K McDermott 0-3, C Minogue 0-2 (0-1f), K White, D Ryan, A McCarthy, R Considine 0-1 each.	Report	E Sheehan 2-2, D Connery 0-6 (0-5f), R Downey 1-2, B Murphy 1-1, B Turnbull 0-4 (0-2f), L O’Shea 0-2, B Buckley, S O’Leary-Hayes, C Hanafin, B Roche 0-1 each.

=== Ulster Minor Hurling Championship ===
Quarter-final

3 June 2017 Quarter-final	Donegal	4-24 - 1-8	Armagh	MacCumhaill Park, Ballybofey
19:00	S Anderson 1-7 (0-5f); R Craig 1-5; J Barr 2-1; K Brady 0-4; D Duffy 0-3 (1 pen); P Tourish, PJ McCarron, C McGlynn, R Hilferty 0-1 each.	Report	O Fullerton 0-5 (3f); O Richards 1-0; S McGuinness 0-2; C McGrory 0-1.	Referee: A Ferguson (Fermanagh)

Semi-finals

2 July 2017 Semi-final	Antrim	1-21 - 0-18	Down	Corrigan Park, Belfast
14:00	S Elliott 1 -9 (4f), T Murphy 0-6 (5f), D Smith 0-3, C McHugh 0-2, E McQuillan 0-1.	Report	C McCrickard 0-5 (2f), R McCrickard 0-5f, R Costello 0-3, M McVey 0-2, T Murray, R Blair (f), C Smyth 0-1 each.	Referee: J Connors (Donegal)

2 July 2017 Semi-final	Derry	4-16 - 2-6	Donegal	Celtic Park, Derry
14:00	R Mullan 1-9 (0-8f), T McHugh 2-0, T Rankin 1-1, Declan Quinn 0-3 (1f), F Bradley, C McAlinden, E O'Kane 0-1 each.	Report	S Anderson 0-4 (4f), Ben Doherty 1-1, J Barr 1-0, K Brady 0-1.	Attendance: C Canning (Antrim)

Final

9 July 2017 Final	Derry	2-8 - 3-13	Antrim	Owenbeg
	R Mullan 1-3 (0-3fs), R Rafferty 1-0, T McHugh 0-2, T Rankin, P McLaughlin, D Quinn 0-1 each.	Report	T Murphy 1-5 (0-2fs), E McQuillan 2-1, D Smith 0-3, S Elliott 0-2 (1f), C McHugh, C Boyd 0-1 each.

== All-Ireland Minor Hurling Championship ==
=== Quarter-finals ===
22 July 2017 Quarter-final	Galway	2-19 - 1-12	Clare	Páirc Uí Chaoimh, Cork
13:00	J Canning 1-3, C Walsh 0-5 (0-4f), E Fahey 1-0, S Bleahane 0-3, D Mannion 0-2, J Fleming, C Fahey, B Moran, M McManus, C Elwood, S Ryan 0-1 each.	Report	G Cooney 1-3, K White 0-3, D Ryan, A McCarthy, C Darcy, G Cahill, B Horner, R Considine 0-1 each.	Referee: J O'Brien (Laois)

22 July 2017 Quarter-final	Dublin	2-20 - 0-11	Antrim	Páirc Esler, Newry
18:00	S Currie (2-13, four frees), M Grogan (0-2), E Allen (0-2), B Coffey (0-1), L Murphy (0-1), C Derwin (0-1).	Report	S Elliott (0-5, three frees), T Murphy (0-4, all frees), D Smith (0-1), A McGrath (0-1).	Referee: J Keane (Galway)

=== Semi-finals ===
6 August 2017 Semi-final	Kilkenny	2-8 - 1-12	Galway	Croke Park, Dublin
14:00	E Cody 1-1, A Mullen 0-4 (0-2f, 0-1 65), J Ryan 1-0, J Brennan, N Brassil and E O’Shea 0-1 each.	Report	J Canning 1-4 (1-0 pen), S Bleahane 0-3, C Walsh 0-2 (0-2f), C Molloy, D Mannion and E Fahy 0-1 each.	Referee: J Murphy (Limerick)

13 August 2017 Semi-final	Cork	0-23 - 2-13	Dublin	Croke Park, Dublin
13:30	B Turnbull 0-13 (0-11f), D Connery 0-5 (0-2f), D Linehan and B Roche 0-2 each, G Millerick 0-1.	Report	E O’Neill and M Grogan 1-1 each, S Currie 0-6 (0-3f), L Murphy 0-4 (0-3f) and E Allen 0-1.	Referee: M Murtagh (Westmeath)

=== Final ===
3 September 2017 Final	Galway	2-17 - 2-15	Cork	Croke Park, Dublin
13:15	J Canning (2-02), C Molloy (0-07, 0-07f), S Bleahane (0-05), D Loftus (0-01); B Moran (0-01); D Mannion (0-01).	Report	B Turnbull (1-07, 0-03f), E Sheehan (1-00), L O'Shea (0-03), C Hanafin (0-02), D Connery (0-01), R Downey (0-01), B Murphy (0-01).	Referee: S Cleere (Kilkenny)

== Statistics ==
=== Top scorers ===
Top scorers overall

Rank	Player	Team	Tally	Total	Matches	Average
1	Brian Turnbull	Cork	1-51	54	6	9.00
2	Seán Currie	Dublin	2-47	53	5	10.60
3	Adrian Mullen	Kilkenny	3-42	51	5	10.20
4	Mikey Mullen	Meath	1-29	32	3	10.66
5	Paul O'Brien	Limerick	0-30	30	3	10.00
6	Ross Banville	Wexford	0-28	28	3	9.33
6	Daire Connery	Cork	0-28	28	6	4.67
8	Oisín Bennett	Laois	1-21	24	4	6.00
9	Jack Canning	Galway	4-09	21	3	7.00
10	Ciarán Tobin	Kildare	1-17	20	2	10.00

Top scorers in a single game

Rank	Player	Team	Tally	Total	Opposition
1	Seán Currie	Dublin	2-13	19	Antrim
2	Mikey Mullen	Meath	1-11	14	Westmeath
3	Brian Turnbull	Cork	0-13	13	Dublin
4	Adrian Mullen	Kilkenny	1-09	12	Dublin
4	Seán Elliott	Antrim	1-09	12	Down
4	Richie Mullan	Derry	1-09	12	Donegal
4	Adrian Mullen	Kilkenny	1-09	12	Wexford
4	Seán Currie	Dublin	0-12	12	Wexford
4	Adrian Mullen	Kilkenny	0-12	12	Westmeath
10	Adrian Mullen	Kilkenny	1-08	11	Laois
10	Ross Banville	Wexford	0-11	11	Dublin
10	Paul O'Brien	Limerick	0-11	11	Tipperary

== Awards ==
Team of the Year

1. Darach Fahy
2. Caimin Kelleher
3. Seán O'Leary-Hayes
4. Darren Morrissey
5. Aidan McCarthy
6. James Keating
7. Lee Gannon
8. Daire Connery
9. Conor Fahey
10. Brian Roche
11. Seán Currie
12. Adrian Mullen
13. Seán Bleahene
14. Jack Canning
15. Brian Turnbull
