= Kathleen Canning =

American history scholar

Kathleen Canning is the Andrew W. Mellon Professor of History at Rice University. Previously, she taught at the University of Michigan.

== Early life and education ==
Canning earned her bachelor's degree from University of Oregon and Heidelberg University. She earned her master's and Ph.D. from Johns Hopkins University.

== Publications ==
=== Books ===
- Weimar Publics/Weimar Subjects: Rethinking the Political Culture of Germany in the 1920s
- Gender History in Practice: Historical Perspectives on Bodies, Class & Citizenship
- Gender, Citizenships and Subjectivities
