= Colin Currie (hurler) =

Irish hurler

Personal information
- Native name: Cóilín Ó Camhraí (Irish)
- Born: 1998 (age 27–28) Glasnevin, Dublin, Ireland
- Occupation: Student

Sport
- Sport: Hurling
- Position: Left corner-forward
Club
- Years: Club
- Na Fianna
Club titles
- Dublin titles: 1
College
- Years: College
- DCU Dóchas Éireann
College titles
- Fitzgibbon titles: 0
Inter-county*
Years	County	Apps (scores)
2021-	Dublin	0 (0-00)
Inter-county titles
- Leinster titles: 0
- All-Irelands: 0
- NHL: 0
- All Stars: 0
- *Inter County team apps and scores correct as of 14:50, 1 July 2021.

Colin Currie (born 1998) is an Irish hurler who plays for Dublin Senior Championship club Na Fianna and at inter-county level with the Dublin senior hurling team. He usually lines out as a left corner-forward.

== Career ==
A member of the Na Fianna club in Glasnevin, Currie first came to prominence on the inter-county scene as a member of the Dublin minor team that won the 2016 Leinster Championship. He subsequently lined out with the Dublin under-21 team as well as with DCU Dóchas Éireann in the Fitzgibbon Cup. Currie joined the Dublin senior hurling team in 2021, alongside his brother Seán Currie.

== Career statistics ==
As of match played 12 June 2021.

Team	Year	National League			Leinster		All-Ireland		Total	
Team	Year	Division	Apps	Score	Apps	Score	Apps	Score	Apps	Score
Dublin	2021	Division 1B	0	0-00	0	0-00	0	0-00	0	0-00
Career total			0	0-00	0	0-00	0	0-00	0	0-00

== Honours ==
Dublin

- Leinster Minor Hurling Championship: 2016
