= 2018 All-Ireland Under-21 Hurling Championship =

All-Ireland Under-21 Hurling Championship 2018
Championship Details
- Dates: 7 May 2018 – 26 August 2018
- Teams: 14

All Ireland Champions
- Winners: Tipperary (10th win)
- Captain: Colin English
- Manager: Liam Cahill

All Ireland Runners-up
- Runners-up: Cork
- Captain: Shane Kingston
- Manager: Denis Ring

Provincial Champions
- Munster: Cork
- Leinster: Galway
- Ulster: Not Played
- Connacht: Not Played

Championship Statistics
- Top Scorer: Evan Niland (2-28)

The 2018 All-Ireland Under-21 Hurling Championship was the 55th and last staging of the All-Ireland Under-21 Hurling Championship since its establishment by the Gaelic Athletic Association in 1964. The championship began on 7 May 2018 and ended on 26 August 2018.

Limerick were the defending champions, however, they were defeated by Tipperary in the Munster semi-final.

On 26 August 2018, Tipperary won the championship following a 3-13 to 1-16 defeat of Cork in the All-Ireland final. This was their 10th All-Ireland title overall and their first in eight championship seasons. They were the first team ever to win the All-Ireland title after being defeated in the Munster Championship.

== Format change ==
Central Council motions to alter the format of the championship were endorsed by the Gaelic Athletic Association's Special Congress on 30 September 2017. The proposal to allow Galway and Ulster teams as agreed by the Leinster and Ulster Councils into the Leinster Championship was backed by 72% of delegates. The original recommendation would have ended All-Ireland semi-finals as the Munster winners were set to face off against the Leinster winners from 2018 onwards. Cork argued that the All-Ireland semi-finals should be retained with the Munster champions taking on the runners-up in Leinster and vice versa. Their idea was endorsed by 78% of delegates.

This was the final year of the under-21 championship as the GAA Congress voted on 24 February 2018 to change to an under-20 championship in 2019.

== Team summaries ==
Team	Colours	Most recent success	
Team	Colours	All-Ireland	Provincial
Carlow	Green, red and yellow		
Clare	Saffron and blue	2014	2014
Cork	Red and white	1998	2007
Dublin	Blue and navy		2016
Galway	Maroon and white	2011	
Kilkenny	Black and amber	2008	2017
Laois	Blue and white		1983
Limerick	Green and white	2017	2017
Offaly	Green, white and gold		2000
Tipperary	Blue and gold	2010	2010
Waterford	White and blue	2016	2016
Westmeath	Maroon and white		
Wexford	Purple and gold	1965	2015

== Leinster Under-21 Hurling Championship ==
Playoff Round 1

26 May 2018 Playoff Round 1	Antrim	1-19 - 3-22 (aet)	Carlow	National Sports Campus, Abbotstown
	J McNaughton 0-10 (5f, 2 ’65’), C Cunning 1-3 (0-1f), G Walsh, E O’Neill 0-2 each, K Molloy, E McQuillan 0-1 each.	Report	C Nolan 1-11 (9f), C Whelan 1-5 (4f), P Hynes 1-2, J Wall, K McDonald, J Nolan, A Amond 0-1 each.	Referee: S Stack (Dublin)

26 May 2018 Playoff Round 1	Laois	1-10 - 4-16	Dublin	O'Moore Park, Portlaoise
	C Comerford 0-7 (0-5f), J Cranny 1-0, S Downey, M Kavanagh & B Corby 0-1 each.	Report	S Currie 3-2, C Currie (0-2f, 0-1 ’65) & C Dowling (0-1f) 0-4 each, F Flanagan 1-0 OG, J McGuirk, L Gannon, F Whitely, C Costello, C Ryan & C Burke 0-1 each.

Playoff Round 2

6 June 2018 Playoff Round 2	Carlow	0-12 - 4-18	Dublin	Netwatch Cullen Park, Carlow
	C Nolan 0-11 (7f), C Whelan 0-1 (f).	Report	E Dunne 1-3, P Crummey 1-2, C Costello 1-1, C Currie 0-4 (3f), C O'Sullivan 1-0, E Conroy 0-2, C Burke 0-1, J McGuirk 0-1, D Keogh 0-1, C Dowling 0-1, R Hayes 0-1, S McCaw 0-1.	Referee: B Redmond (Wexford)

Quarter-finals

13 June 2018 Quarter-final	Offaly	0-08 - 1-20	Galway	O'Connor Park, Tullamore
	B Duignan 0-5 (0-4f, 0-1 ’65), W Mooney, C O’Brien, E Woods 0-1 each.	Report	E Niland 0-9 (0-8f), S Loftus 1-2, C Fahy 0-4 (0-1f), S Blehane 0-3, B Concannon, J Canning 0-1 each	Referee: D Hughes (Carlow)

13 June 2018 Quarter-final	Westmeath	1-13 - 2-13	Dublin	Cusack Park, Mullingar
	KDoyle 1-7 (7f), C Doyle 0-6 (1f)	Report	D Burke 2-3 (1f), C Dowling 0-4, R Hayes (2f, 1 “65”) and F Whitely 0-2 each, C Currie and E Conroy 0-1 each.	Referee: J Heffernan (Wexford)

Semi-finals

20 June 2018 Semi-final	Dublin	3-12 - 3-15	Wexford	Parnell Park, Dublin
	C Currie 2-7, D Burke 0-3, C O'Sullivan 0-1 E Conroy 0-1	Report	S Casey 0-10, J O'Connor 1-2, S O'Gorman 0-1, A Maddock 0-1, M Dywer 2-0	Referee: D Hughes

20 June 2018 Semi-final	Kilkenny	1-17 - 3-13	Galway	O'Connor Park, Tullamore
	J Bergin (0-7, 0-5f, 0-1 '65'), J Donnelly (1-2), R Leahy (0-3), A Mullen (0-2), C Hennessy (0-2), C Prendiville (0-1).	Report	E Niland (1-6, 0-3f), C Fahy (1-2), S Bleahene (1-0), K Cooney (0-4), B Concannon (0-1).	Referee: A Devine (Westmeath)

Final

4 July 2018 Final	Galway	4-21 - 2-26 (aet)	Wexford	O'Moore Park, Portlaoise
	E Niland 1-7 (7f), T Monaghan 1-2, K Cooney 1-2, C Fahy 0-5 (1'65, 1f), S Bleahene 1-0, B Concannon 0-2, S Loftus 0-1, F Burke 0-1, C Caulfield 0-1. Wexford:	Report	S Casey 1-11 (9f), R O'Connor 0-7 (2f), I Carthy 1-0, S O'Gorman 0-2, J O'Connor 0-2, R White 0-2, G Molloy 0-1, R Higgins 0-1.	Referee: J O'Brien (Laois)

== Munster Under-21 Hurling Championship ==
Quarter-final

7 May 2018 Quarter-final	Clare	0-13 - 3-18	Limerick	Cusack Park, Ennis
17:45	A McCarthy (0-6, 0-6 frees); G Cooney, P O’Loughlin (0-2 each); S O’Loughlin, S Conway, M Corry (0-1 each).	Report	B Ryan (0-6); B Murphy (0-5, 0-4 frees); C Boylan, S Flanagan (1-2 each); M O’Dwyer (1-1); P O’Loughlin, D O’Connell (0-1 each).	Attendance: 3,135; Referee: P Kelly (Tipperary)

Semi-finals

20 June 2018 Semi-final	Cork	0-23 - 1-17	Waterford	Páirc Uí Chaoimh, Cork
	D Dalton 0-8 (frees), D Fitzgibbon 0-3, S Kingston, R O’Flynn, J O’Connor, D Connery, L Healy 0-2 each, M Coleman, C Cahalane 0-1 each.	Report	JP Lucey 1-2, J Prendergast 0-4 (frees), B Nolan 0-3 (frees), A Casey 0-2, P Hogan, D Lyons, N Montgomery, I Daly, C Prunty, C Lyons 0-1 each.	Attendance: 3,260; Referee: J McCormack (Tipperary)

21 June 2018 Semi-final	Tipperary	1-22 - 1-13	Limerick	Semple Stadium, Thurles
	Mark Kehoe 0-5, Lyndon Fairbrother 0-3 (0-3f), Brian McGrath 0-3 (0-3f), David Gleeson 1-0, Jake Morris 0-3, Colin English 0-3, Ger Browne 0-2, Jerome Cahill 0-1, Cian Darcy 0-1, Darragh Woods 0-1	Report	Brian Murphy 0-4 (0-3f), Kevin Howard 1-0, Micheal Houlihan 0-2 (0-2f), Paddy O’Loughlin 0-2 (0-2f), Brian Ryan 0-1, Conor Boylan 0-1, Willie O’Meara 0-1, Oisin O’Reilly 0-1, Peter Casey 0-1 (0-1f)	Attendance: 3,460; Referee: R McGann (Clare)

Final

4 July 2018 Final	Cork	2-23 - 1-13	Tipperary	Páirc Uí Chaoimh, Cork
	D Dalton (0-7, 0-3 frees, 0-1 sc); J O’Connor (1-2); S Kingston (0-4); R O’Flynn (1-1); M Coleman (0-3, 0-1 free, 0-1 sc); L Healy (0-2); T O’Mahony, E Murphy, C Cahalane, A Myers (0-1 each).	Report	L Fairbrother (0-5, 0-4 frees, 0-1 ‘65); J Cahill (1-1); G Browne (0-4); D Woods (0-2); J Morris (0-1).	Attendance: 6,732; Referee: J Murphy (Limerick)

== All-Ireland Under-21 Hurling Championship ==
=== All-Ireland Semi-Finals ===
4 August 2018 Semi-final	Cork	3-26 - 0-13	Wexford	Nowlan Park, Kilkenny
	T O'Mahony 2-02, D Dalton 0-08 (6f), L Healy 1-01, J O'Connor 0-04, S Kingston 0-04, C Cahalane 0-04, A Myers 0-02 (2f), C O'Leary 0-01.	Report	S Casey 0-06 (3f, 1 sideline), R White 0-02, A Maddock 0-02, D Reck 0-02, C Hearne 0-01.	Referee: A Kelly (Galway)

8 August 2018 Semi-final	Galway	1-17 - 3-17	Tipperary	Gaelic Grounds, Limerick
	E Niland 0-6 (0-6f), J Grealish 1-0, T Monaghan 0-3, B Concannon 0-2, S Loftus 0-2, S Bleahene 0-1, A Greaney 0-1, C Salmon 0-1, J Coyne 0-1.	Report	J Morris 1-9 (0-6f), G Browne 1-2, M Kehoe 1-1, C Darcy 0-2, R Byrne 0-1, C English 0-1, D Quirke 0-1.	Referee: S Cleere (Kilkenny)

=== All-Ireland final ===
26 August 2018 Final	Cork	1-16 - 3-13	Tipperary	Gaelic Grounds, Limerick
17:40	C Cahalane 1-3, D Dalton 0-5 (5fs), R O’Flynn 0-3, T O’Mahony, S Kingston, B Turnbull, D Fitzgibbon, J O’Connor 0-1 each.	Report	J Morris 1-4 (3fs), S Nolan and C Stakelum 1-0 each, J Cahill 0-3, C Darcy 0-2, C English, G Browne, D Gleeson, and P Feehan 0-1 each.	Attendance: 16,173; Referee: J Keenan (Wicklow)

== Statistics ==
=== Top scorers ===
Top scorers overall

Rank	Player	Club	Tally	Total	Matches	Average
1	Evan Niland	Galway	2-28	34	4	8.50
2	Séamus Casey	Wexford	1-27	30	3	10.00
3	Declan Dalton	Cork	0-28	28	4	7.00
4	Chris Nolan	Carlow	1-22	25	2	12.50
5	Jake Morris	Tipperary	2-17	23	4	5.75
6	Colin Currie	Dublin	2-16	22	4	5.50
7	Cianan Fahy	Galway	1-11	14	4	3.50
8	Donal Burke	Dublin	2-06	12	2	6.00
8	Conor Cahalane	Cork	1-09	12	4	3.00
8	Jack O'Connor	Cork	1-09	12	4	3.00
8	Ger Browne	Tipperary	1-09	12	4	3.00

Top scorers in a single game

Rank	Player	Club	Tally	Total	Opposition
1	Chris Nolan	Carlow	1-11	14	Antrim
1	Séamus Casey	Wexford	1-11	14	Galway
3	Colin Currie	Dublin	2-07	13	Wexford
4	Seán Currie	Dublin	3-02	11	Laois
4	Chris Nolan	Carlow	0-11	11	Dublin
6	Killian Doyle	Westmeath	1-07	10	Dublin
6	Evan Niland	Galway	1-07	10	Wexford
6	James McNaughton	Antrim	0-10	10	Carlow
6	Séamus Casey	Wexford	0-10	10	Dublin
10	Donal Burke	Dublin	2-03	9	Westmeath
10	Evan Niland	Galway	1-06	9	Kilkenny
10	Jake Morris	Tipperary	1-06	9	Galway
10	Evan Niland	Galway	0-09	9	Offaly

=== Miscellaneous ===
- Cork won the Munster title for the first time since 2007.
- Cork qualified for the All-Ireland final for the first time since 1998.
- Tipperary became the first team to be beaten in the provincial championship and still qualify for the All-Ireland final.

== Awards ==
2018 Bord Gáis Energy Team of the Year was announced on 17 October.

1. Ger Collins (Cork)
2. Killian O’Dwyer (Tipperary)
3. Brian McGrath (Tipperary)
4. Niall O’Leary (Cork)
5. Fintan Burke (Galway)
6. Robert Byrne (Tipperary)
7. Billy Hennessy (Cork)
8. Mark Coleman (Cork)
9. Ger Browne (Tipperary)
10. Robbie O’Flynn (Cork)
11. Rory O’Connor (Wexford)
12. Cianan Fahy (Galway)
13. Jake Morris (Tipperary)
14. Tim O’Mahony (Cork)
15. Seamus Casey (Wexford)
