= Warren Canning =

Australian rules footballer

Personal information
- Full name: Warren Richard Canning
- Born: 10 June 1927; Melbourne
- Died: 3 October 2012 (aged 85); East Melbourne
- Original team: Bendigo
- Height: 197 cm (6 ft 6 in)
- Weight: 91 kg (201 lb)

Playing career^{1}
Years	Club	Games (Goals)
1949, 1951	Geelong	7 (3)
- ^{1} Playing statistics correct to the end of 1951.

Warren Canning (10 June 1927 – 3 October 2012) was an Australian rules footballer who played with Geelong in the Victorian Football League (VFL).
