= All-Ireland Minor Hurling Championship =

Annual under-17 hurling competition

GAA Hurling All-Ireland Minor Championship
- Current season or competition: 2026 All-Ireland Minor Hurling Championship
- Irish: Craobh Iomána Mionúr na hÉireann
- Code: Hurling
- Founded: 1928; 98 years ago
- Region: (Republic of Ireland) Ireland (GAA)
- Trophy: Irish Press Cup
- No. of teams: 5
- Title holders: Limerick (4th title)
- Most titles: Tipperary (22 titles)
- Sponsors: Electric Ireland
- TV partner: TG4
- Motto: This is major
- Official website: Official website

The GAA Hurling All-Ireland Minor Championship (known for sponsorship reasons as the Electric Ireland GAA Hurling All-Ireland Minor Championship) is an annual inter-county hurling competition organised by the Gaelic Athletic Association (GAA). It is the highest inter-county hurling competition for male players under the age of 17 in Ireland and has been contested every year - except for a three-year absence during the Emergency - since 1928.

The final, currently held on the third Sunday in August, is the culmination of a series of games played during July and August, with the winning team receiving the Irish Press Cup. The qualification procedures for the championship have changed several times throughout its history. Currently, qualification is limited to teams competing in the Leinster and Munster Championships as well as Galway. Having previously been played on a straight knockout basis, the championship has incorporated a round robin since 2018.

Five teams currently participate in the All-Ireland Championship, with the most successful teams coming from the provinces of Leinster and Munster. Kilkenny, Cork and Tipperary are considered "the big three" of hurling. They have won 63 championships between them.

The title has been won by 10 different teams, all of whom have won the title more than once. The all-time record-holders are Tipperary, who have won the championship on 22 occasions. Limerick are the current champions.

== History ==
=== Creation ===
Since 1887 the All-Ireland Senior Championship had provided inter-county games for adult males. This was supplemented by the creation of the All-Ireland Junior Championship in 1912 which provided a springboard to develop players before progressing to senior level. The All-Ireland Minor Championship was the third championship to be created and was aimed at developing younger players who were under the age of 18.

=== Beginning ===
The inaugural All-Ireland Championship in 1928 used a provincial format. 12 teams contested the respective championships in Leinster and Munster, with Cork and Dublin emerging as the respective champions. There were no representatives in Connacht or Ulster.

Cork and Dublin contested the first All-Ireland Championship match - the delayed final - on Sunday 1 September 1929 at Croke Park, Dublin. After a draw on the first day, Cork won the All-Ireland final replay on 27 October 1929 to take the title.

=== Development ===
The first two All-Ireland Championships featured the Munster and Leinster champions facing off in the All-Ireland final. The Ulster Championship was introduced in the 1930 necessitating the need for an All-Ireland semi-final to be introduced. The Connacht champions qualified for the first time in 1931, with the four provincial winners participating in two All-Ireland semi-finals. Over time the Leinster and Munster teams grew to become the superpowers of the game, as Gaelic football was the more dominant sport in Ulster and Connacht. After some time Galway became the only credible team in Connacht and was essentially given an automatic pass to the All-Ireland semi-final every year. This knock-out system persisted for nearly 60 years and was considered to be the fairest system as the All-Ireland champions would always be the only undefeated team of the year.

In the mid-1990s the Gaelic Athletic Association looked at developing a new system whereby a defeat in the championship for certain teams would not mean an immediate exit from the Championship. In the 1997 championship the first major change in format arrived when the 'back-door system' was introduced. This new structure allowed the defeated Munster and Leinster finalists another chance to regain a place in the All-Ireland semi-finals. Clare and Offaly were the first two teams to benefit from the new system when they qualified for the first All-Ireland quarter-finals. Clare subsequently became the first team to win the All-Ireland Championship through the 'back-door' after a 1-11 to 1-09 defeat of Galway in the All-Ireland final.

=== Age reduction ===
On 26 January 2008, a radical motion was brought before a special Congress in an effort to combat player burnout. It was proposed to merge the existing Under-21 and Minor championships to create a new All-Ireland Under-19 Hurling Championship. This motion was defeated by 115 votes to 58.

In an effort to combat player burnout, a new proposal to change the championship from an under-18 competition to an under-17 one was introduced by GAA Director-General Páraic Duffy at Congress on 26 February 2016. The motion was narrowly passed by a 68.2% majority. Cork in 2017 won the inaugural Minor U17 All Ireland Championship Final defeating Dublin in Croke Park 1-19 to 1-17.

=== Team dominance ===
Since the beginning the championship has been dominated by Cork, Kilkenny and Tipperary. As of 2019, they have won a combined total of 59 of the 89 championship titles. These three teams began their hegemony by winning 12 of the first 14 championship titles between 1928 and 1941.

Cork and Tipperary set the first championship record during this time by becoming the first two teams to win three successive All-Ireland Championships. Dublin became the first team outside of the "big three" to win successive All-Ireland Championships in 1945 and 1946.

Tipperary dominated the post-Emergency era by contesting 15 of the 18 All-Ireland finals between 1945 and 1962, including six-in-a-row between 1952 and 1957. They claimed a further eight All-Ireland Championships during this time. After Kilkenny became the third team to win three successive All-Ireland Championships between 1960 and 1962, Wexford won their only three All-Ireland Championships between 1963 and 1968 as Cork reemerged to dominate the fifteen-year period between 1964 and 1979. During this time they claimed eight All-Ireland Championships from 12 final appearances. Kilkenny also reestablished themselves as the standard bearers of the Leinster Championship during this time and won five All-Ireland Championships from 12 final appearances between 1969 and 1984.

The 1980s saw Galway and Offaly claim their first All-Ireland Championships, while Limerick secured the Centenary-year title after a lapse of nearly 30 years.

Galway emerged as the most dominant team of the 21st century. Between 1999 and 2020 they claimed 11 All-Ireland Championships from 15 final appearances, including an historic 4-in-a-row from 2017 to 2020, being the first county to every achieve such a feat.

== Current format ==
=== Championship ===
There are eight teams in the All-Ireland Championship. During the course of a championship season (from May to June) seven games are played comprising two preliminary quarter-finals, two quarter-finals, two semi-finals and the final.

=== Qualification and progression ===
	Teams entering in this round	Teams advancing from previous round
Preliminary quarter-finals (4 teams)	Beaten Leinster semi-finalists; Munster 3rd and 4th-placed teams	
Quarter-finals (4 teams)	Leinster runners-up; Munster runners-up	2 winners from the preliminary quarter-finals
Semi-finals (4 teams)	Leinster champions; Munster champions	2 winners from the quarter-finals
Final (2 teams)		2 winners from the semi-finals

== Trophy and medals ==
At the end of the All-Ireland final, the winning team is presented with a trophy. The Irish Press Cup is held by the winning team until the following year's final. Traditionally, the presentation is made at a special rostrum in the Ard Chomairle section of the Hogan Stand where GAA and political dignitaries and special guests view the match.

The cup is decorated with ribbons in the colours of the winning team. During the game the cup actually has both teams' sets of ribbons attached and the runners-up ribbons are removed before the presentation. The winning captain accepts the cup on behalf of his team before giving a short speech. Individual members of the winning team then have an opportunity to come to the rostrum to lift the cup.

On 30 August 1949, The Irish Press Ltd. announced that they had presented a silver cup to the Gaelic Athletic Association to mark the 21st anniversary of the All-Ireland Championship. The cup is modelled on an ancient Celtic mether. The cup was first presented to John O'Grady of Tipperary in 1949.

In accordance with GAA rules, the Central Council awards up to twenty-six gold medals to the winners of the All-Ireland final. The medals are 9 carat gold and depict the design of the GAA. Trophies are awarded to the All-Ireland runners-up.

== Roll of honour ==
No.	Team	Wins	Years won	Losses	Years lost
1	Tipperary	22	1930, 1932, 1933, 1934, 1947, 1949, 1952, 1953, 1955, 1956, 1957, 1959, 1976, 1980, 1982, 1996, 2006, 2007, 2012, 2016, 2022, 2024	14	1935, 1945, 1946, 1950, 1954, 1960, 1961, 1962, 1987, 1991, 1999, 2002, 2015, 2026
2	Kilkenny	21	1931, 1935, 1936, 1950, 1960, 1961, 1962, 1972, 1973, 1975, 1977, 1981, 1988, 1990, 1991, 1993, 2002, 2003, 2008, 2010, 2014	25	1930, 1932, 1937, 1938, 1939, 1948, 1949, 1956, 1957, 1959, 1969, 1971, 1974, 1976, 1978, 1979, 1984, 1995, 1998, 2004, 2009, 2018, 2019, 2020, 2024
3	Cork	20	1928, 1937, 1938, 1939, 1941, 1951, 1964, 1967, 1969, 1970, 1971, 1974, 1978, 1979, 1985, 1995, 1998, 2001, 2017, 2021	12	1936, 1966, 1968, 1975, 1977, 1986, 1988, 1990, 1994, 2000, 2007, 2017
4	Galway	14	1983, 1992, 1994, 1999, 2000, 2004, 2005, 2009, 2011, 2015, 2017, 2018, 2019, 2020	21	1931, 1933, 1941, 1947, 1951, 1955, 1958, 1970, 1973, 1981, 1982, 1993, 1996, 1997, 2001, 2003, 2006, 2008, 2013, 2021, 2023
5	Dublin	4	1945, 1946, 1954, 1965	6	1928, 1952, 1953, 1983, 2011, 2012
5	Limerick	4	1940, 1958, 1984, 2026	5	1963, 1965, 2005, 2014, 2016
5	Waterford	4	1929, 1948, 2013, 2025	1	1992
8	Wexford	3	1963, 1966, 1968	3	1967, 1980, 1985
8	Offaly	3	1986, 1987, 1989	1	2022
10	Clare	2	1997, 2023	3	1989, 2010, 2025
11	Laois	0	—	2	1934, 1964
11	Meath	0	—	1	1929
11	Antrim	0	—	1	1940

== List of finals ==
=== Recent finals ===
Year	Winners	Score	Runners-up	Score	Venue	Winning Captain	Ref
1966 (R)	Wexford	6–07 (25); 6–07 (25)	Cork	6–07 (25); 1–08 (11)	Croke Park; Croke Park	Pat Bernie	
1967	Cork	2–15 (21)	Wexford	5–03 (18)	Croke Park	Pat Moylan	
1968	Wexford	2–13 (19)	Cork	3–07 (16)	Croke Park	Tom Byrne	
1969	Cork	2–15 (21)	Kilkenny	3–06 (15)	Croke Park	Seán Collins	
1970	Cork	5–19 (34)	Galway	2–09 (15)	Croke Park	Pat Kavanagh	
1971	Cork	2–11 (17)	Kilkenny	1–11 (14)	Croke Park	Séamus Coughlan	
1972	Kilkenny	8–07 (31)	Cork	3–09 (18)	Croke Park	Brian Cody	
1973	Kilkenny	4–05 (17)	Galway	3–07 (16)	Croke Park	Kevin Robinson	
1974	Cork	1–10 (13)	Kilkenny	1–08 (11)	Croke Park	Billy Geaney	
1975	Kilkenny	3–19 (28)	Cork	1–14 (17)	Croke Park	Harry Ryan	
1976	Tipperary	2–20 (26)	Kilkenny	1–07 (10)	Croke Park	Joe Hogan	
1977 (R)	Kilkenny	4–08 (20); 1–08 (11)	Cork	3–11 (20); 0–09 (9)	Croke Park.	Seán Fennelly	
1978	Cork	1–15 (18)	Kilkenny	1–08 (11)	Croke Park	P. Murphy	
1979	Cork	2–11 (17)	Kilkenny	1–09 (12)	Croke Park	Christy Coughlan	
1980	Tipperary	2–15 (21)	Wexford	1–10 (13)	Croke Park	Jim Maher	
1981	Kilkenny	1–20 (23)	Galway	3–09 (18)	Croke Park	E. Kennedy	
1982	Tipperary	2–07 (13)	Galway	0–04 (4)	Croke Park	John Kennedy	
1983	Galway	0–10 (10)	Dublin	0–07 (7)	Croke Park	Anthony Cunningham	
1984 (R)	Limerick	1–14 (17); 2–05 (11)	Kilkenny	3–08 (17); 2–04 (10)	Semple Stadium; Semple Stadium	Anthony O'Riordan	
1985	Cork	3–10 (19)	Wexford	0–12 (12)	Croke Park	M. O'Mahony	
1986	Offaly	3–12 (21)	Cork	3–09 (18)	Croke Park	M. Hogan	
1987	Offaly	2–08 (14)	Tipperary	0–12 (12)	Croke Park	T. Moylan	
1988	Kilkenny	3–13 (22)	Cork	0–12 (12)	Croke Park	Patsy Brophy	
1989	Offaly	2–16 (22)	Clare	1–12 (15)	Croke Park	Brian Whelahan	
1990 (R)	Kilkenny	3–14 (23); 3–16 (25)	Cork	3–14 (23); 1–11 (14)	Croke Park; Semple Stadium	James McDermott	
1991	Kilkenny	0–15 (15)	Tipperary	1–10 (13)	Croke Park	D. O'Neill	
1992	Galway	1–13 (16)	Waterford	2–04 (10)	Croke Park	Conor O'Donovan	
1993	Kilkenny	1–17 (20)	Galway	1–12 (15)	Croke Park	S. Doyle	
1994	Galway	2–10 (16)	Cork	1–11 (14)	Croke Park	Greg Kennedy	
1995	Cork	2–10 (16)	Kilkenny	1–02 (5)	Croke Park	Brian O'Keeffe	
1996 (R)	Tipperary	0–20 (20); 2–14 (20)	Galway	3–11 (20); 2–12 (18)	Croke Park; Croke Park	William Maher	
1997	Clare	1–11 (14)	Galway	1–09 (12)	Croke Park	John Reddan	
1998	Cork	2–15 (21)	Kilkenny	1–09 (12)	Croke Park	Cathal McCarthy	
1999	Galway	0–13 (13)	Tipperary	0–10 (10)	Croke Park	John Culkin	
2000	Galway	2–19 (25)	Cork	4–10 (22)	Croke Park	Richie Murray	
2001	Cork	2–10 (16)	Galway	1–08 (11)	Croke Park	Tomás O'Leary	
2002	Kilkenny	3–15 (25)	Tipperary	1–07 (10)	Croke Park	Michael Rice	
2003	Kilkenny	2–16 (22)	Galway	2–15 (21)	Croke Park	Richie Power	
2004 (R)	Galway	3–12 (21); 0–16 (16)	Kilkenny	1–18 (21); 1–12 (15)	Croke Park; O'Connor Park	John Lee	
2005	Galway	3–12 (21)	Limerick	0–17 (17)	Croke Park	Andrew Keary	
2006	Tipperary	2–18 (24)	Galway	2–07 (13)	Croke Park	Joey McLoughney	
2007	Tipperary	3–14 (23)	Cork	2–11 (17)	Croke Park	Brendan Maher	
2008	Kilkenny	3–06 (15)	Galway	0–13 (13)	Croke Park	Thomas Breen	
2009	Galway	2–15 (21)	Kilkenny	2–11 (17)	Croke Park	Richie Cummins	
2010	Kilkenny	2–10 (16)	Clare	0–14 (14)	Croke Park	Cillian Buckley	
2011	Galway	1–21 (24)	Dublin	1–12 (15)	Croke Park	Shane Moloney	
2012	Tipperary	2–13 (19); 2–18 (24)	Dublin	1–16 (19); 1–12 (15)	Croke Park	Bill Maher	
2013	Waterford	1–21 (24)	Galway	0–16 (16)	Croke Park	Kevin Daly	
2014	Kilkenny	2–17 (23)	Limerick	0–19 (19)	Croke Park	Darragh Joyce	
2015	Galway	4–13 (25)	Tipperary	1–16 (19)	Croke Park	Seán Loftus	
2016	Tipperary	1–21 (24)	Limerick	0–17 (17)	Croke Park	Brian McGrath	
2017 U18	Galway	2–17 (23)	Cork	2–15 (21)	Croke Park	Darren Morrissey	
2018	Galway	0–21 (21)	Kilkenny	0–14 (14)	Croke Park	Seán Neary	
2019	Galway	3–14 (23)	Kilkenny	0–12 (12)	Croke Park	Ian McGlynn	
2020	Galway	1-17 (20)	Kilkenny	1-14 (17)	MW Hire O'Moore Park	Adam Nolan	
2021	Cork	1-23 (26)	Galway	0-12 (12)	Semple Stadium	Ben O'Connor; James Dwyer	
2022	Tipperary	1-17 (20)	Offaly	1-16 (19)	Nowlan Park		
2023	Clare	2-22 (28)	Galway	4-11 (23)	Semple Stadium		
2024	Tipperary	2-17 (23)	Kilkenny	3-12 (21)	Nowlan Park		
2025	Waterford	1-18 (21)	Clare	0-11 (11)	Semple Stadium		
2026	Limerick	2-12 (18)	Tipperary	1-14 (17)	Gaelic Grounds	Shane Waters	

=== All-time record ===
Year	Winner	Opponent
1965	Dublin 4–10	Limerick 2–7
1964	Cork 10–7	Laois 1–4
1963	Wexford 6–12	Limerick 5–9
1962	Kilkenny 3–6	Tipperary 0–9
1961	Kilkenny 3–13	Tipperary 0–15
1960	Kilkenny 7–12	Tipperary 1–11
1959	Tipperary 2–8	Kilkenny 2–7
1958	Limerick 5–8	Galway 3–10
1957	Tipperary 4–7	Kilkenny 3–7
1956	Tipperary 4–16	Kilkenny 1–5
1955	Tipperary 5–15	Galway 2–5
1954	Dublin 2–7	Tipperary 2–3
1953	Tipperary 8–6	Dublin 3–6
1952	Tipperary 9–9	Dublin 2–3
1951	Cork 4–5	Galway 1–8
1950	Kilkenny 3–4	Tipperary 1–5
1949	Tipperary 6–5	Kilkenny 2–4
1948	Waterford 3–8	Kilkenny 4–2
1947	Tipperary 9–5	Galway 1–5
1946	Dublin 1–6	Tipperary 0–7
1945	Dublin 3–14	Tipperary 4–6
1944	Suspended	
1943	Suspended	
1942	Suspended	
1941	Cork 3–11	Galway 1–1
1940	Limerick 6–4	Antrim 2–4
1939	Cork 5–2	Kilkenny 2–2
1938	Cork 7–2	Dublin 5–4
1937	Cork 8–5	Kilkenny 2–7
1936	Kilkenny 2–4	Cork 2–3
1935	Kilkenny 4–2	Tipperary 3–3
1934	Tipperary 4–3	Laois 3–5
1933	Tipperary 4–6	Galway 2–3
1932	Tipperary 8–6	Kilkenny 5–1
1931	Kilkenny 4–7	Galway 2–3
1930	Tipperary 4–1	Kilkenny 2–1
1929	Waterford 5–0	Meath 1–1
1928	Cork 1–8 7–6 (R)	Dublin 3–2 4–0 (R)

== Managers ==
Managers in the All-Ireland Championship are involved in the day-to-day running of the team, including the training, team selection, and sourcing of players from the club championships. Their influence varies from county-to-county and is related to the individual county boards. The manager is assisted by a team of two or three selectors and an extensive backroom team consisting of various coaches. Prior to the development of the concept of a manager in the 1970s, teams were usually managed by a team of selectors with one member acting as chairman.

Winning managers
Manager	Team	Wins	Winning years
Michael O'Brien	Cork	6	1969, 1970, 1971, 1974, 1978, 1979
Mattie Murphy	Galway	6	1992, 1994, 2004, 2005, 2009, 2011
Liam Barron	Kilkenny	3	1990, 1991, 1993
Jeffrey Lynskey	Galway	3	2015, 2017, 2018
Pad Joe Whelehan	Offaly	2	1986, 1987
John Hardiman	Galway	2	1999, 2000
Richie Mulrooney	Kilkenny	2	2008, 2010
Brian Hanley	Galway	2	2019, 2020
James Woodlock	Tipperary	2	2022, 2024
Johnny Clifford	Cork	1	1985
Brendan O'Sullivan	Kilkenny	1	1988
Pat Moylan	Offaly	1	1989
Jimmy Barry-Murphy	Cork	1	1995
Dinny Cahill	Tipperary	1	1996
Kevin Kennedy	Clare	1	1997
Denis Burns	Cork	1	1998
John Considine	Cork	1	2001
Nicky Cashin	Kilkenny	1	2002
Damien Brennan	Kilkenny	1	2003
Liam Sheedy	Tipperary	1	2006
Declan Ryan	Tipperary	1	2007
William Maher	Tipperary	1	2012
Seán Power	Waterford	1	2013
Brian Ryan	Limerick	1	2014
Liam Cahill	Tipperary	1	2016
Noel Furlong	Cork	1	2021
Brian O'Connell	Clare	1	2023
James O'Connor	Waterford	1	2025

== Records and statistics ==
=== By decade ===
The most successful team of each decade, judged by number of All-Ireland Minor Hurling Championship titles, is as follows:

- 1920s: 1 each for Cork (1928) and Waterford (1929)
- 1930s: 4 for Tipperary (1930-32-33-34)
- 1940s: 2 for Tipperary (1947–49)
- 1950s: 6 for Tipperary (1952-53-55-56-57-59)
- 1960s: 3 each for Kilkenny (1960-61-62), Wexford (1963-66-68) and Cork (1964–67-69)
- 1970s: 5 for Cork (1970-71-74-78-79)
- 1980s: 3 for Offaly (1986-87-89)
- 1990s: 3 for Kilkenny (1990-91-93) and Galway (1992-94-99)
- 2000s: 4 for Galway (2000-04-05-09)
- 2010s: 5 for Galway (2011-15-17-18-19)
- 2020s: 2 for Tipperary (2022-24)

=== Gaps ===
Longest gaps between successive All-Ireland titles:

- 65 years: Waterford (1948-2013)
- 42 years: Limerick (1984-2026)
- 26 years: Limerick (1958-1984)
- 20 years: Cork (2001-2021)
- 19 years: Waterford (1929-1948)
- 18 years: Limerick (1940-1958)
- 17 years: Tipperary (1959-1976)
- 14 years: Kilkenny (1936-1950)
- 14 years: Tipperary (1982-1996)
- 13 years: Tipperary (1934-1947)
- 13 years: Cork (1951-1964)

=== Top scorers ===
==== By year ====
Year	Top scorer	Team	Score	Total
1986	Dan O'Connell	Cork	9-02	29
1987	Declan Pilkington	Offaly	2-28	34
1988	Brian Cunningham	Cork	3-29	38
1989	Johnny Dooley	Offaly		
1990	Damien Fleming	Cork	7-27	48
1991	P. J. Delaney	Kilkenny	2-29	35
1992	Paul Flynn	Waterford	6-25	43
1993	Ollie O'Connor	Kilkenny	5-35	50
1994	Brian O'Driscoll	Cork	0-26	26
1995	Stephen Phillips	Dublin	2-24	30
1996	Eugene O'Neill	Tipperary	3-48	57
1997	Henry Shefflin	Kilkenny	5-20	35
1998	Leon O'Connell	Wexford	3-37	46
1999	Eoin Kelly	Tipperary	1-21	24
2000	Brian Carroll	Offaly	2-39	45
2001	Kieran Murphy	Cork	5-38	53
2002	Richard Flynn	Wexford	4-23	35
2003	Richie Power	Kilkenny	1-29	32
2004	Darragh Hickey	Tipperary	4-29	41
2005	Eoin Ryan	Limerick	4-40	52
2006	Richie Hogan	Kilkenny	5-38	53
2007	Ryan Clifford	Cork	5-30	45
2008	Michael O'Hanlon	Wexford	3-37	46
2009	John O'Dwyer	Tipperary	4-37	49
2010	Niall Arthur	Clare	0-50	50
2011	Mattie Lennon	Armagh	4-25	37
2012	Bobby Duggan	Clare	3-49	58
2013	Patrick Curran	Waterford	3-56	65
2014	Alan Murphy	Kilkenny	3-46	55
2015	Andrew Gaffney	Kilkenny	1-38	41
2016	Rory O'Connor	Wexford	3-33	39
2017	Brian Turnbull	Cork	1-51	54
2018	Conor Kelly	Kilkenny	2-72	78
2019	Billy Drennan	Kilkenny	2-66	72
2020	Lochlainn Quinn	Offaly	1-42	45
2021	Jack Leahy	Cork	4-41	53

==== In finals ====
Final	Top scorer	Team	Score	Total
2012	John McGrath	Limerick	1-11	14
2013	Patrick Curran	Waterford	1-07	10
2014	John Walsh	Kilkenny	2-05	11
2015	Evan Niland	Galway	0-09	9
2016	Brian Ryan	Limerick	0-11	11
2017	Jack Canning	Galway	2-02	10
2017	Brian Turnbull	Cork	1-07	10
2018	Donal O'Shea	Galway	0-10	10
2019	Seán McDonagh	Galway	2-08	14
2020	Liam Collins	Galway	1-07	10
2021	Jack Leahy	Cork	0-07	7
