= Ernest Canning =

English cricketer

Ernest George Canning (11 August 1902 – 16 November 1995) was an English first-class cricketer active 1929–31 who played for Middlesex. He was born in Marylebone; died in Southampton.
