= George Canning (disambiguation) =

George Canning (1770–1827) was Prime Minister of the United Kingdom.

George Canning may also refer to:

- George Canning (writer) (c. 1730–1771), Irish writer and father of the prime minister
- George Canning, 1st Baron Garvagh (1778–1840), Anglo-Irish Member of Parliament
- George Canning (athlete) (1889–1955), British athlete
