= Mark Canning =

Mark Canning may refer to:

- Mark Canning (footballer) (born 1983), Scottish footballer for Albion Rovers
- Mark Canning (diplomat) (born 1954), UK ambassador to Indonesia
