= 2018 All-Ireland Under-21 Hurling Championship final =

2018 All-Ireland Under-21 Hurling Championship Final
- Event: 2018 All-Ireland Under-21 Hurling Championship
| Cork | Tipperary |
| 1-16 | 3-13 |
- Date: 26 August 2018
- Venue: Gaelic Grounds, Limerick
- Man of the Match: Robert Byrne
- Referee: John Keenan (Wicklow).
- Weather: Rain

The 2018 All-Ireland Under-21 Hurling Championship final was a hurling match that was played on 26 August 2018 to determine the winners of the 2018 All-Ireland Under-21 Hurling Championship, the 55th season of the All-Ireland Under-21 Hurling Championship, a tournament organised by the Gaelic Athletic Association for the champion and runner-up teams of Leinster and Munster. The final was played at the Gaelic Grounds in Limerick and contested by Cork and Tipperary, who both represent the province of Munster.

The final between Cork and Tipperary was the first time that teams from the same province played each other in a decider. Cork were hoping to claim their 12th championship title overall and a first since 1998. Cork had previously beaten Tipperary by 13 points in the Munster final on 4 July 2018. Tipperary were hoping to win their 10th All-Ireland title.

The final was broadcast live as part of GAA Beo on TG4, presented by Mícheál Ó Domhnaill.

Cork were in front by 1-9 to 1-7 at half time but Tipperary won the game by 3-13 to 1-16 with an injury time goal by Conor Stakelum putting Tipperary into the lead by two points, another point by David Gleeson put them three points in front before the final whistle was blown.

== Match ==
=== Details ===
26 August 2018
17:08:39

| Cork | 1-16 - 3-13 | Tipperary |
|---|---|---|
| Conor Cahalane 1-3, Declan Dalton 0-5 (5fs), Robbie O’Flynn 0-3, Tim O’Mahony, Shane Kingston, Brian Turnbull, Darragh Fitzgibbon, Jack O’Connor 0-1 each. | Report | Jake Morris 1-4 (3fs), Stephen Nolan and Conor Stakelum 1-0 each, Jerome Cahill 0-3, Cian Darcy 0-2, Colin English, Ger Browne, David Gleeson, and Paudie Feehan 0-1 each. |

Gaelic Grounds
Referee: John Keenan (Wicklow)

| Cork | Tipperary |
