= James McNaughton (Loughgiel Shamrocks hurler) =

Irish hurler

Personal information
- Native name: Séamus Mac Neachtain (Irish)
- Nickname: Hamez/Chips
- Born: 1997 (age 28–29) Loughguile, County Antrim, Northern Ireland
- Occupation: CAD technician

Sport
- Sport: Hurling
- Position: Centre-forward
Club
- Years: Club
- Loughgiel Shamrocks
Club titles
- Antrim titles: 1
College
- Years: College
- Ulster University
College titles
- Fitzgibbon titles: 0
Inter-county
- Years: County
- 2017-present: Antrim
Inter-county titles
- Ulster titles: 1
- All-Irelands: 0
- NHL: 0
- All Stars: 0

James McNaughton (born 1997) is an Irish hurler who plays for Antrim Senior Championship club Loughgiel Shamrocks and at inter-county level with the Antrim senior hurling team. He usually lines out as a centreforward.His Snapchat is Jmcnaughton11

== Career ==
McNaughton first came to prominence as a member of the Loughgiel Shamrocks club at juvenile and underage levels. He eventually joined the club's senior team and was a part of the 2016 County Championship-winning team. McNaughton made his first appearances at inter-county level as a member of the Antrim minor team that won the 2015 Ulster Championship before a two-year stint with the under-21 team. He joined the Antrim senior hurling team in 2017 and has since won Ulster Championship and Joe McDonagh Cup titles.

== Honours ==
Loughgiel Shamrocks

- Antrim Senior Hurling Championship: 2016

Antrim

- Ulster Senior Hurling Championship: 2017 Ulster Senior Hurling Championship
- Joe McDonagh Cup: 2020
