= Dr O'Callaghan Cup =

Annual inter-school hurling competition

- Irish: Corn an Dr Uí Cheallacháin
- Code: Hurling
- Founded: 1911
- Region: Cork (GAA)
- Trophy: Dr O'Callaghan Cup
- No. of teams: 8
- Title holders: Gaelcholáiste Mhuire AG (th title)
- Official website: Official website

The Dr O'Callaghan Cup is an annual inter-schools hurling competition organised by the Cork PPS division of the Gaelic Athletic Association (GAA). Sometimes referred to throughout its history as the Cork Colleges Senior A Hurling Championship and officially known as the Cork PPS Senior A Hurling Championship, it has been contested since 1911. It is the highest inter-school hurling competition in the county of Cork.

The final, currently held in March, serves as the culmination of a knockout series of games played between October and March. Eligible players must be under the age of 19. It is a stand-alone competition and runs concurrently with the Dr Harty Cup.

Nine teams currently participate in the Dr O'Callaghan Cup. St Francis College are the title-holders after defeating Christian Brothers College by 2–15 to 2–09 in the 2024 final.

== Participating teams ==
The following teams took part in the 2023–24 series of games.

Team	Location
Christian Brothers College	Cork
Coláiste an Spioraid Naoimh	Bishopstown
Coláiste Choilm	Ballincollig
Gaelcholáiste Mhuire AG	Cork
Hamilton High School	Bandon
Midleton CBS	Midleton
St Colman's College	Fermoy
St Francis College	Rochestown

== List of finals ==
Year	Winners	Score	Runners-up	Score
2000	St Finbarr's College	0–13	St Colman's College	0-07
2001	St Finbarr's College	2–10	St Colman's College	1–11
2002	St Colman's College	2–15	Coláiste Chríost Rí	0-08
2003	Douglas Community School	1–10	St Colman's College	1-09
2004	Coláiste an Spioraid Naoimh	3–10	St Finbarr's College	0-06
2005	St Colman's College	3–16	Coláiste Chríost Rí	0-05
2006	St Colman's College	1–10	Midleton CBS	0-08
2007	Glanmire Community College	1–10	St Brogan's College	1-08
2008	St Brogan's College	2–11	Glanmire Community College	0–14
2009	St Colman's College	4–15	Coláiste Chríost Rí	2–13
2010	Midleton CBS	3–11	St Colman's College	2–12
2011	St Colman's College	3–16	North Monastery	2-08
2012	Midleton CBS	3–11	St Colman's College	0–14
2013	Midleton CBS	2–11	Patrician Academy	1-06
2014	Hamilton High School	2–17	Midleton CBS	2-08
2015	St Francis College	2-09	Gaelcholáiste Mhuire AG	1-06
2016	St Francis College	3-24	Scoil Mhuire gan Smál	0-08
2017	Midleton CBS	0–11	St Colman's College	0–10
2018	Midleton CBS	1-20	Gaelcholáiste Mhuire AG	0–13
2019	Christian Brothers College	2-22	St Colman's College	2–16
2020	Midleton CBS	3-24	St Francis College	1–15
2021	Cancelled due to the COVID-19 pandemic			
2022	Christian Brothers College	3–13	Gaelcholáiste Mhuire AG	1–12
2023	St Colman's College	1-24	Gaelcholáiste Mhuire AG	1-20
2024	St Francis College	2–15	Christian Brothers College	2-09
2025	Gaelcholáiste Mhuire AG	3–18	Christian Brothers College	1–13
2026	Gaelcholáiste Mhuire AG	1–19	Christian Brothers College	1–17
