= Glanmire Community College =

Secondary school near Cork city, Ireland

Coordinates: 51.9310997°N 8.3842679°W

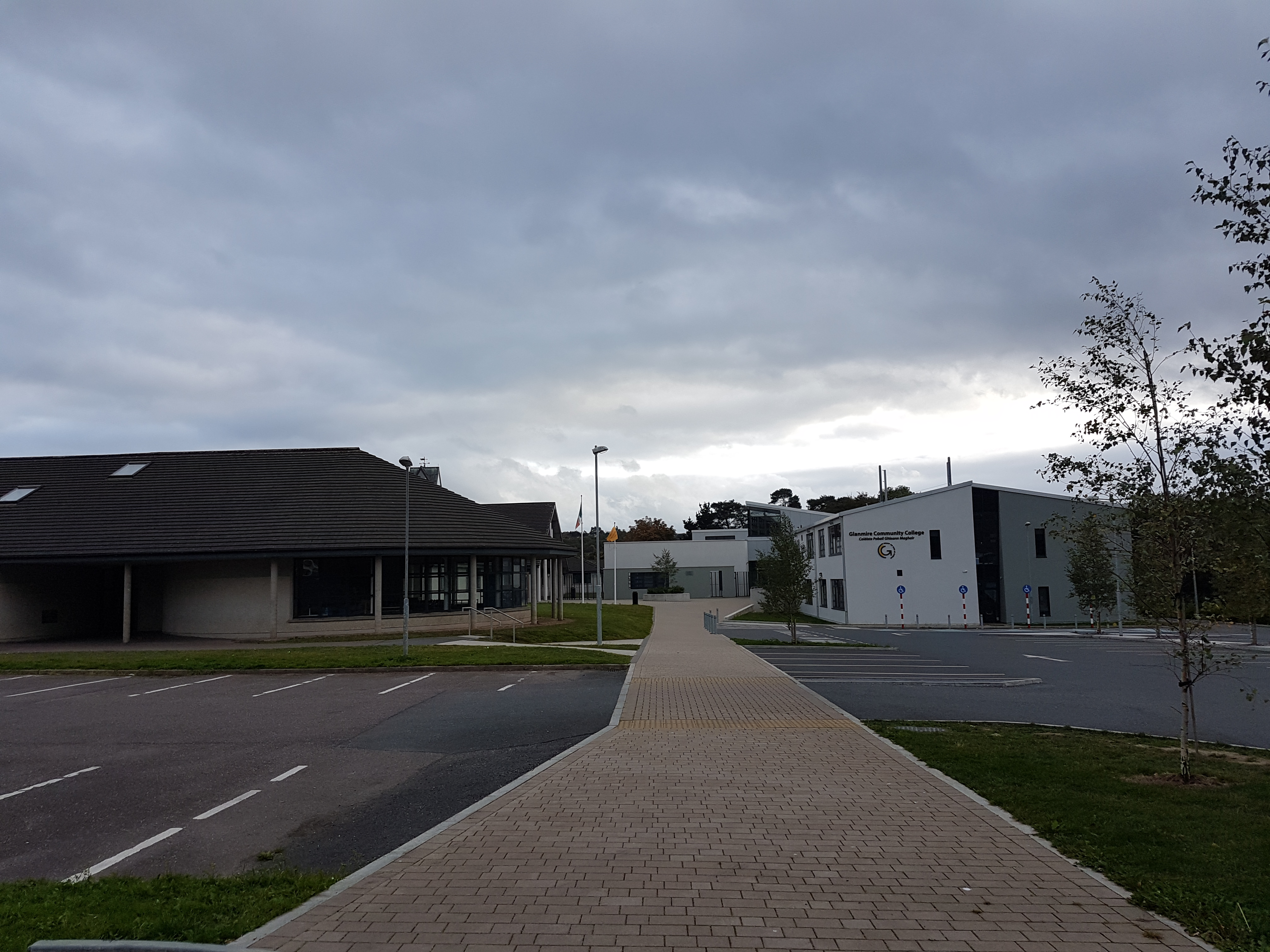
- Glanmire Community College
- Cork, Glanmire; Ireland

Information
- Type: Secondary School
- Motto: Ní neart go cur le chéile. (A chain is only as strong as its weakest link)
- Established: 1997
- Principal: Ronan McCarthy
- Enrollment: approx. 1.000
- Colours: Red, black, and white
- Website: http://www.glanmirecc.ie//

Glanmire Community College is an Irish secondary school located in Glanmire, Cork, Ireland. It was opened in 1997 and has since expanded.

It is a designated Community College under the joint trusteeship of the Cork Education and Training Board and the Diocese of Cork and Ross. It serves the second level education needs of the greater Glanmire area.

There are roughly 85 teachers and 1000 students in Glanmire Community College. The school has many facilities, including a music room, woodwork and metalwork rooms, technical graphics rooms, home economics kitchens, sports facilities, including a tennis/basketball court, a gymnasium, a gym, and a GAA pitch. Glanmire Community College also unveiled an all-weather pitch on 24 September 2021. The school is involved in many projects, such as work with Bothar, and has attained a Green Flag in the Green Schools project.

The school's principal is Ronan McCarthy.

== Alumni ==
- Daniel Kearney (b. 1989) - hurler
- Cathal O'Sullivan (b. 2007) - footballer
- Conor O'Sullivan (b. 1989) - hurler

== See also ==
- Education in the Republic of Ireland
