= David Canning =

British economist

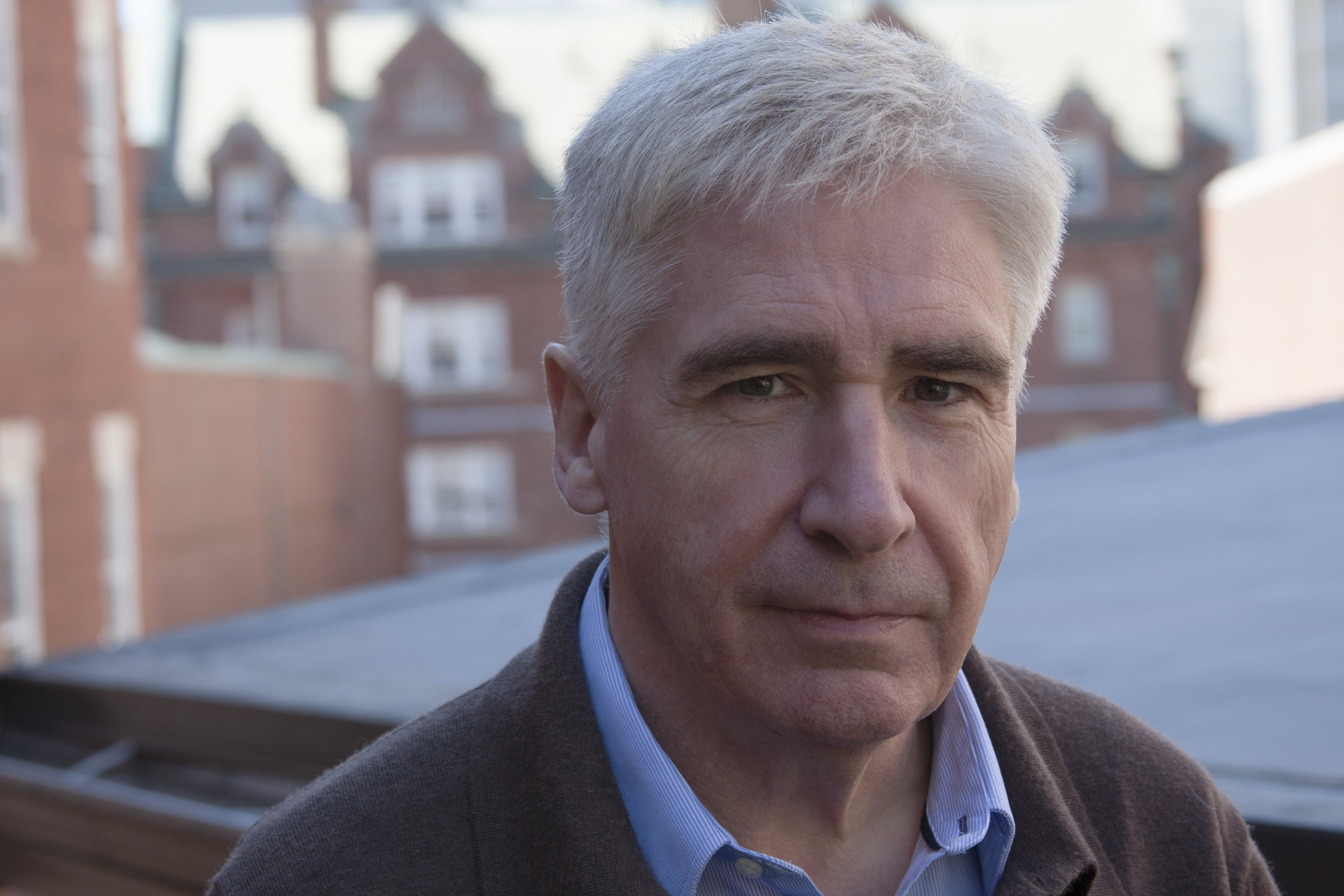
by Claudette Agustin

David Canning is a British economist. He is Richard Saltonstall Professor of Population Sciences and Professor of Economics and International Health at the Harvard School of Public Health. He holds a Ph.D. in economics from Cambridge University and is deputy director of the Program on the Global Demography of Aging. Before assuming his role at the Harvard School of Public Health, Canning held faculty positions at the London School of Economics, Cambridge University, Columbia University, and Queen's University Belfast, where he received his B.A. in economics and mathematics.

Canning has served as a consultant to the World Health Organization, the World Bank, and the Asian Development Bank. He was also a member of Working Group One of the World Health Organization's Commission on Macroeconomics and Health.

Canning's research on demographic change focuses on the effect of changes in age structure on aggregate economic activity, and the effect of changes in longevity on economic behavior. In terms of health, the research focuses on health as a form of human capital and its effect on worker productivity.
