= Seán Currie =

Irish hurler

Personal information
- Native name: Seán Ó Camhraí (Irish)
- Born: 1999 (age 26–27) Glasnevin, Dublin, Ireland
- Occupation: Student

Sport
- Sport: Hurling
- Position: Centre-forward
Club
- Years: Club
- Na Fianna
Club titles
- Dublin titles: 2
- Leinster titles: 1
- All-Ireland Titles: 1
College
- Years: College
- DCU Dóchas Éireann
College titles
- Fitzgibbon titles: 0
Inter-county*
Years	County	Apps (scores)
2021-	Dublin	24 (5-84)
Inter-county titles
- Leinster titles: 0
- All-Irelands: 0
- NHL: 0
- All Stars: 0
- *Inter County team apps and scores correct as of 01:30, 6 July 2025.

Seán Currie (born 1999) is an Irish hurler who plays for Dublin Senior Championship club Na Fianna and at inter-county level with the Dublin senior hurling team. He usually lines out as a centre-forward.

== Career ==
A member of the Na Fianna club in Glasnevin, Currie first came to prominence at schools' level with the combined Dublin North team that won the Leinster Colleges Championship in 2018. He subsequently appeared with DCU Dóchas Éireann in the Fitzgibbon Cup. Currie made his first appearance on the inter-county scene as a member of the Dublin minor team during the 2017 Leinster Championship, ending the season as one of the top scorers and by being named on the Minor Team of the Year. He subsequently progressed onto the under-21/20 teams before joining the Dublin senior hurling team in 2021, alongside his brother Colin Currie.

Currie finished as the top scorer in the 2025 All-Ireland Senior Hurling Championship with a total of 4–68 over 8 matches. He also received an All-Star nomination.

== Career statistics ==
As of match played 12 June 2021.

Team	Year	National League			Leinster		All-Ireland		Total	
Team	Year	Division	Apps	Score	Apps	Score	Apps	Score	Apps	Score
Dublin	2021	Division 1B	0	0-00	0	0-00	0	0-00	0	0-00
Career total			0	0-00	0	0-00	0	0-00	0	0-00

== Honours ==
Na Fianna

- All-Ireland Senior Club Hurling Championship (1): 2025
- Leinster Senior Club Hurling Championship (1): 2025
- Dublin Senior Hurling Championship (2): 2023, 2024

Dublin North

- Leinster Colleges Senior Hurling Championship: 2018

=== Individual ===
Awards

- All-Ireland Senior Hurling Championship Top Scorer: 2025
