= Albert Canning (British Army officer) =

British army officer who served in WWI

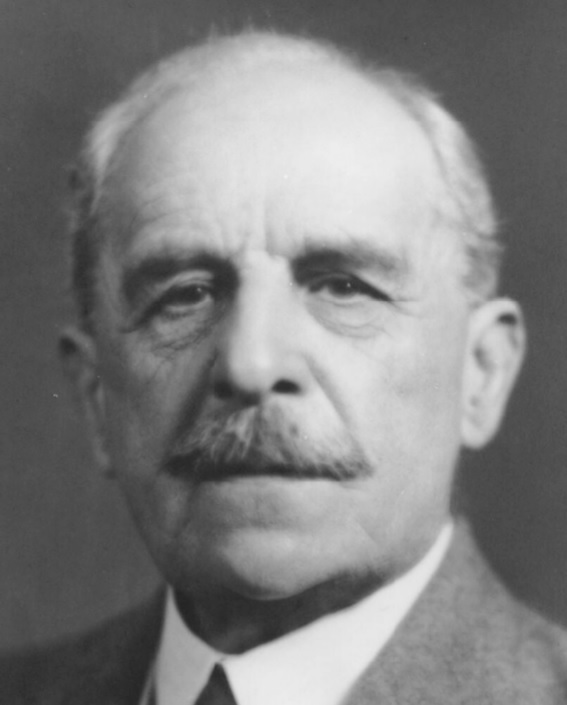
Albert Canning in the 1930s by Elliott & Fry (NPG x92204).

Lieutenant Colonel Albert Canning (3 October 1861 – 20 November 1960) was a British Army officer.

== Life ==
Born in Wiltshire, where he also died, he joined as a private in the 19th Hussars in 1881, with whom he served in the 1882 Anglo-Egyptian War and the 1884–1885 Sudan campaign - on his death he was the oldest surviving veteran of the former. He was made a Second Lieutenant in the South Wales Borderers in 1888. He moved to the Prince of Wales's Leinster Regiment (Royal Canadians) on promotion to Captain on 9 October 1895, and served as adjutant of volunteers for the 5th battalion from 22 January 1898. Returning as a regular officer in his regiment in January 1903, he was promoted to major on 27 May 1903.

He retired in 1911 at the rank of Major only to return to the Leinster Regiment as commander of its 3rd (Special Reserve) Battalion on the outbreak of the First World War. In that role he was usually stationed in Cork, but he was moved to command 1/7th Battalion of the Manchester Regiment in the Gallipoli campaign in June 1915. He spent almost a year in the field before returning to the UK on sick leave.

He then returned to command the 3rd Leinsters for two more years and retired in August 1918. He was not only a justice of the peace in Wiltshire but also a Home Guard volunteer during the Second World War.
