= 2016 All-Ireland Minor Hurling Championship =

All-Ireland Minor Hurling Championship 2016
Championship Details
- Dates: 6 April 2016 - 4 September 2016
- Teams: 20

All Ireland Champions
- Winners: Tipperary (20th win)
- Captain: Brian McGrath
- Manager: Liam Cahill

All Ireland Runners-up
- Runners-up: Limerick
- Captain: Kyle Hayes
- Manager: Pat Donnelly

Provincial Champions
- Munster: Tipperary
- Leinster: Dublin
- Ulster: Antrim
- Connacht: Not Played

Championship Statistics
- Matches Played: 27
- Total Goals: 73 (2.70 per game)
- Total Points: 812 (30.07 per game)
- Top Scorer: Rory O'Connor (3-33)

The 2016 All-Ireland Minor Hurling Championship was the 86th staging of the All-Ireland hurling championship since its establishment by the Gaelic Athletic Association in 1928. It is the primary inter-county hurling championship for boys under the age of eighteen. The championship began on 6 April 2016 and ended on 4 September 2016.

Galway entered the championship as the defending champions, however, they were beaten by Tipperary in the All-Ireland semi-final.

On 4 September 2016 Tipperary won the championship following a 1–21 to 0–17 defeat of Limerick in the All-Ireland final. This was their 20th All-Ireland title and their first in four championship seasons.

== Provincial championships ==
=== Leinster Minor Hurling Championship ===
==== Leinster First Round ====
- The two tier 1 counties are given byes.
- The four tier 2 counties play in two matches.
- The four tier 3 counties play in two matches. The two beaten tier 3 teams are eliminated.

Tier 2

9 April 2016 Tier 2	Westmeath	1-12 - 5-15	Wexford	TEG Cusack Park, Mullingar
13:45	M Kennedy 1-1 (1-0pen, 0-1f), S O'Brien, S Dowd (2fs, 1'65') 0-3 each, E Fox (1f), C O'Brien (2fs) 0-2 each, C McCrossan 0-1(f).	Report	R O'Connor 1-6 (0-3fs, 0-1 '65'), C Hearne 1-4, A Walsh, T Doyle, D Lynch 1-0 each, Q Sanders 0-3, C Flood 0-2.	Referee: A Keating (Dublin)

9 April 2016 Tier 2	Offaly	1-15 - 1-12	Laois	O'Connor Park, Tullamore
14:00	E Woods 0-9 (8fs), C Langton 0-3, D Nally 1-0, M Ryan, E Kelly, D Buckley 0-1 each.	Report	A Bergin 0-6 (3fs, 2 '65s'), A Dunphy 0-4, M Dowling 1-0, L McDonald, S Dunphy 0-1 each.	Referee: A Devine (Westmeath)

Tier 3

9 April 2016 Tier 3	Wicklow	0-7 - 10-22	Meath	Pearse Park, Arklow
13:30	P O'Toole 0-3, I Clancy, A Byrne, C Connolly, S Coogan 0-1 each.	Report	P Farrell 4-7 (2fs), R Byrne 2-4, M Cullen 2-1, J Cummins 1-3 (2fs), B Dowling 1-1, W Flynn, S Martin (f), C McNally, S Coffey, D Murtagh, J Leavy 0-1 each.	Referee: S Cleere (Kilkenny)

9 April 2016 Tier 3	Carlow	0-14 - 0-12	Kildare	Netwatch Cullen Park, Carlow
15:00	C Nolan 0-6 (4fs); C Treacy 0-3; C Lennon 0-2; T Lawlor, J Nolan, N Roche 0-1 each	Report	J Burke 0-6 (5fs); S Ryan 0-3; C O'Regan, C Kielty, C Smith (f) 0-1 each.	Referee: M O'Sullivan (Kilkenny)

==== Leinster Second Round ====
The two tier 1 teams play the two winning tier 2 teams from the first round. The two winning teams advance to the semi-finals. The two beaten teams advance to the quarter-finals.

23 April 2016 Second round	Wexford	0-21 - 1-14 (AET)	Dublin	Innovate Wexford Park, Wexford
	R O'Connor 0-12, C Hearne, C Flood 0-3 each, D Reck, B O'Connor, E Kelly 0-1 each.		R Hayes 1-1, C Curris 0-4, C Sullivan, J McGuirk, D Gray 0-2 each, C Burke, D Keogh, C Dowling 0-1 each.

23 April 2016 Second round	Kilkenny	3-25 - 1-13	Offaly	Nowlan Park, Kilkenny
	E Delaney 0-10, J Bergin 2-3, S Buggy 1-2, S Bolger 0-4, J Connolly 0-2, C Kavanagh, J Donnelly, C Prenderville, N Brassil 0-1 each.		E Woods 0-5, J Keenaghan 0-4, A Kenny 1-0, A Maher, E Kelly, C Langton, D Young 0-1 each.

The two beaten tier 2 teams from the first round play the two winning tier 3 teams from the first round. The two winning teams advance to the quarter-finals. The two beaten teams are eliminated.

23 April 2016 Second round	Westmeath	1-17 - 0-15	Meath	Cusack Park, Mullingar
	M Kennedy 1-4, S O'Brien, C O'Brien 0-4 each, D O'Reilly 0-2, J Murphy, S Loughlin, E Fox 0-1 each.		P Farrell 0-6, M Cullen 0-5, R Byrne 0-3, B McGowan 0-1.

23 April 2016 Second round	Laois	3-20 - 0-9	Carlow	O'Moore Park, Portlaoise
	A Dunphy 1-7, B Corby 2-0, J Keyes 0-3, S Dunphy, L Delaney and C Comerford 0-2 each, E Killeen, L McDonald, J Walshe, J Keyes 0-1 each.		C Nolan 0-4, G Lawlor 0-2, C Treacy, R McEvoy and D Jordan 0-1 each.

==== Leinster Quarter-Finals ====
The two beaten teams from the tier1 versus tier 2 matches in the second round play the two winning teams from the tier 2 versus tier 3 matches in the second round.

30 April 2016 Quarter-final	Laois	0-12 - 1-18	Dublin	O'Moore Park, Portlaoise
	A Dunphy 0-7 (7f); S Dunphy 0-2; C Comerford, J Keyes, M Dowling 0-1 each.	Report	J McGuirk (9f, 65) 0-11; D Keogh 1-1; D Gray 0-2; C Ryan, C Dowling, C Burke, C Currie 0-1 each.	Referee: B Redmond (Wexford)

30 April 2016 Quarter-final	Westmeath	1-7 - 3-9	Offaly	TEG Cusack Park, Mullingar
	C O'Brien 1-2 (0-2fs), C McCrossan 0-3 (2fs), E Fox, M Kennedy (f) 0-1 each.	Report	J Keenaghan 1-4 (0-4fs), E Woods 1-3 (1-0pen, 0-2fs), D Buckley 1-0, E Kelly, C Langton 0-1 each.	Referee: A Keating (Dublin)

==== Leinster Semi-Finals ====
14 May 2016 Semi-final	Offaly	2-13 - 2-24	Wexford	O'Connor Park, Tullamore
	E Woods 1-4, A Kenny 1-0, D Nally 0-3, E Kelly 0-2, A Maher, J Keenaghan, D Buckley and C Langton 0-1 each.		R O'Connor 2-10, C Hearne and D Rock 0-4 each, C Flood and L Pender 0-2 each, B O'Connor and A Walsh 0-1 each.

14 May 2016 Semi-final	Dublin	2-18 - 1-19 (AET)	Kilkenny	Parnell Park, Dublin
	C Currie 1-10 (0-10f), D Burke 1-1, J McGuirk (0-1f), C Dowling, D Gray 0-2 each, C Ryan 0-1.	Report	A Mullen 0-8 (4f), E Delaney (0-3f, 0-1 sideline), J Donnelly 0-5 each, S Mahony 1-0, V Costello 0-1.	Referee: B Redmond (Wexford)

==== Leinster Final ====
3 July 2016 Final	Wexford	0-12 - 2-12	Dublin	Croke Park, Dublin
14:00	R O'Connor 0-5 (0-2f), D Reck 0-3 (0-2f), C Flood 0-2, J Cullen 0-1, G Molloy 0-1.	Report	D Burke 1-3, C Currie 0-5 (0-4f), J McGuirk 1-1, C Burke 0-1, J Walsh 0-1, C Dowling 0-1	Attendance: 29,377; Referee: P. Burke, Kilkenny

=== Munster Minor Hurling Championship ===
==== Munster Quarter-Finals ====
6 April 2016 Quarter-final	Waterford	1-10 - 0-17	Cork	Walsh Park, Waterford
18:30	E McGrath 1-0, B Nolan 0-3 (0-3f), N Montgomery, E Murray (0-2f) 0-2 each, J Prendergast, C Curran, M Mahony 0-1 each.	Report	E Sheehan (0-1 sideline), J Beausang (0-4f) 0-5 each, M Bradley 0-4, C O’Mahony, R Bourke, L Healy 0-1 each.	Attendance: 2,707; Referee: P Kelly (Tipperary)

6 April 2016 Quarter-final	Limerick	2-11 - 1-8	Clare	Gaelic Grounds, Limerick
19:00	M O’Dwyer 0-3 (0-3f); J Ryan, C Magnier Flynn 1-0 each; C Boylan, K Hayes 0-2 each; C McCarthy, B Ryan, D Carroll (1 sideline), C O’Connor 0-1 each.	Report	S O’Loughlin 0-5 (0-5f); I Murray 1-0; A Kennedy 0-2; C Tierney 0-1.	Attendance: 2,240; Referee: T Walsh (Waterford)

==== Munster play-offs ====
23 April 2016 Play-off	Waterford	1-20 - 1-17	Tipperary	Walsh Park, Waterford
	E Murray 0-11 (4fs, 1 s-l); H Ruddle Redmond 0-5 (3 65s, 2fs); N Montgomery 1-1; J Prendergast 0-2; T Douglas 0-1.	Report	L Fairbrother 0-10 (7fs, 2 65s); D Quirke 1-0; C Darcy 0-3; G Browne 0-2; J Morris, M Kehoe 0-1 each.	Referee: R McGann (Clare)

4 May 2016 Play-off	Clare	0-12 - 2-15	Tipperary	Cusack Park, Ennis
	I Murray 0-5, S O'Loughlin 0-2, C Lynch 0-1, K Galvin 0-1, D Fitzgerald 0-1, C Tierney 0-1, S Kennedy 0-1.	Report	C Darcy 1-1, M Kehoe 0-4, G Browne 0-4, D Walsh 1-0, S Neville 0-2, L Fairbrother 0-2, P Cadell 0-1, J Kelly 0-1.	Referee: J Larkin (Cork)

==== Munster Semi-Finals ====
29 June 2016 Semi-final	Waterford	0-17 - 0-19	Limerick	Walsh Park, Waterford
	E Murray 0-5 (3fs); J Prendergast, C Dalton, M Mahony, D Power, T Douglas 0-2 each; C Kirwan, N Montgomery 0-1 each.	Report	P O'Brien 0-10 (8fs); B Ryan 0-3; D Carroll (1 s-l), K Hayes 0-2 each; C Magnier Flynn, D Woulfe 0-1 each.	Referee: N Wall (Cork)

30 June 2016 Semi-final	Cork	1-12 - 0-23	Tipperary	Páirc Uí Rinn, Cork
	J Beausang (1-7, 0-6 frees); J O’Connor (0-3); E Sheehan (0-2); L Healy, M Bradley, D Gunning (0-1 each).	Report	L Fairbrother (0-10, 0-8 frees); D Walsh (0-4); B McGrath (0-1 free, 0-1 ’65), C Darcy (0-2 each); C Flanagan, P Cadell, G Browne (0-1 free), M Kehoe, R Doody (0-1 each)	Referee: J. Murphy (Limerick)

==== Munster Final ====
10 July 2016 Final	Limerick	0-10 - 1-24	Tipperary	Gaelic Grounds, Limerick
14:00	P O’Brien 0-3f, K Hayes & C Boylan 0-2 each, C Magnier Flynn, J Flynn & A Kennedy (f) 0-1 each.	Report	J Morris 1-4, L Fairbrother 0-7 (3f), B McGrath (2f) & D Walsh 0-3 each, G Browne & M Kehoe 0-2 each, R Doody, C English & S Neville 0-1 each.	Referee: R. McGann (Clare)

=== Ulster Minor Hurling Championship ===
==== Ulster Semi-Finals ====
26 June 2016 Semi-final	Down	w/o - scr.	Armagh	Owenbeg Centre of Excellence

26 June 2016 Semi-final	Antrim	4-23 - 3-11 (AET)	Derry	Owenbeg Centre of Excellence
	C Doherty-Cunning 1-13, E O’Neill 2-3, K Malloy 1-4, P McCallan 1-0, R Crummy 0-1, D McShane 0-1, C McLarnon 0-1.	Report	Brian Cassidy 0-9, E O'Kane 2-00, O McKeever 1-00, J Mullan 0-1, J McGuigan 0-1.

==== Ulster Final ====
10 July 2016 Final	Antrim	2-15 - 0-10	Down	Owenbeg Centre of Excellence
	C Doherty-Cunning 0-10 (8f), D McKernan 1-0 (pen), P McCallin 1-0, K Molloy 0-2, A O'Boyle, D Black, E O'Neill 0-1 each	Report	C McCrickard 0-5 (4f), D Sands 0-2, S McKay, A Doran, R McCrickard 0-1 each, D Rooney 0-1 (f)	Referee: J. Connors (Donegal)

== All-Ireland Minor Hurling Championship ==
=== All-Ireland Quarter-Finals ===
23 July 2016 Quarter-final	Galway	2-22 - 0-8	Antrim	Kingspan Breffni Park, Cavan
	E Niland 1-7 (0-4f), J Coyne 0-5 (0-1f, 1 65), C Salmon 1-1, J Canning 0-3, R Murphy, C Fahy, R Malone, K Cooney, E Fahy, M McManus 0-1 each.	Report	C Doherty-Cunning 0-5 (0-4f), D McShane, D McKernan (0-1f), K Molloy 0-1 each.	Referee: G McGrath (Wexford)

24 July 2016 Quarter-final	Wexford	0-9 - 0-17	Limerick	Semple Stadium, Thurles
	D Reck 0-3 (2f, 1 65), L Stafford & T Doyle 0-2 each, C Flood (f) & A Walsh 0-1 each.	Report	B Ryan 0-10 (6f), C Boylan 0-3, J Adams (f), M O’Grady, K Hayes & D Woulfe 0-1 each.	Referee: D Hughes (Carlow)

=== All-Ireland Semi-Finals ===
7 August 2016 Semi-final	Dublin	0-15 - 1-18	Limerick	Croke Park, Dublin
13:30	Colin Currie 0-8 (all frees), Johnny McGuirk 0-2 (0-1f), Ciaran Dowling 0-2, Conor Burke, Eoin Foley, Daire Gray 0-1 each.	Report	Bryan Ryan 0-10 (0-5 frees), Cian Magner-Flynn (1-1), Kyle Hayes, Anthony Barrett (0-2 each), Finn Hourigan, Mark O’Kelly (free), Conor Boylan (0-1 each).	Referee: J Heffernan (Wexford)

14 August 2016 Semi-final	Tipperary	7-12 - 2-12	Galway	Croke Park, Dublin
13:30	C Darcy 3-2, R Doody 2-2 (0-1f), M Kehoe 1-4, G Browne 1-1, L Fairbrother, B McGrath (free) 0-1 each.	Report	E Niland 0-5 (0-4 frees), M Whelan (own goal), R Murphy 1-0 each, L Forde, E Fahy, C Fahey, J Coyne, K Cooney, J Canning 0-1 each.

=== All-Ireland final ===
4 September 2016 Final	Limerick	0-17 - 1-21	Tipperary	Croke Park, Dublin
13:30	B Ryan (0-11, 9f), D Carroll (0-01), C O’Connor (0-01), C Boylan (0-01), K Hayes (0-01), P O’Brien (0-01), D Woulfe (0-01).	Report	J Morris (1-03), L Fairbrother (0-05, 4f), C English (0-04), S Neville (0-03), B McGrath (0-02, 1f, 1 65), M Kehoe (0-02), G Browne (0-01), D Walsh (0-01).	Referee: J Keennan (Wicklow)

== Scoring statistics ==
Overall

Rank	Player	County	Tally	Total	Matches	Average
1	Rory O'Connor	Wexford	3-33	42	4	10.50
2	Lyndon Fairbrother	Tipperary	0-35	35	6	5.83
2	Brian Ryan	Limerick	0-35	35	6	5.83
4	Conal Cunning	Antrim	1-28	31	3	10.33
4	Colin Currie	Dublin	1-28	31	5	6.20
6	Eoin Woods	Offaly	2-21	27	4	6.75
7	Peter Farrell	Meath	4-13	25	2	12.50
8	Aaron Dunphy	Laois	1-18	21	3	7.00
8	Johnny McGuirk	Dublin	1-18	21	5	4.20
10	Cian Darcy	Tipperary	4-8	20	6	3.33

Top scorer in a single game

Rank	Player	Team	Tally	Total	Opposition
1	Peter Farrell	Meath	4-7	19	Wicklow
2	Rory O'Connor	Wexford	2-10	16	Offaly
2	Conal Cunning	Antrim	1-13	16	Derry
4	Colin Currie	Dublin	1-10	13	Kilkenny
5	Rory O'Connor	Wexford	0-12	12	Dublin
6	Cian Darcy	Tipperary	3-2	11	Galway
6	Brian Ryan	Limerick	0-11	11	Tipperary
6	Eoghan Murray	Waterford	0-11	11	Tipperary
6	Johnny McGuirk	Dublin	0-11	11	Laois
10	Ronan Byrne	Meath	2-4	10	Wicklow
10	Josh Beausang	Cork	1-7	10	Tipperary
10	Evan Niland	Galway	1-7	10	Antrim
10	Aaron Dunphy	Laois	1-7	10	Carlow
10	Brian Ryan	Limerick	0-10	10	Wexford
10	Lyndon Fairbrother	Tipperary	0-10	10	Waterford
10	Edmund Delaney	Kilkenny	0-10	10	Offaly
10	Paul O'Brien	Limerick	0-10	10	Waterford
10	Lyndon Fairbrother	Tipperary	0-10	10	Cork
10	Conal Cunning	Antrim	0-10	10	Down
10	Brian Ryan	Limerick	0-10	10	Dublin
