= 2021 Dublin Senior Hurling Championship =

Annual hurling competition season

- Dates: 3 September - 13 November 2021
- Teams: 16
- Sponsor: Go-Ahead
- Champions: Kilmacud Crokes (6th title); Caolan Conway (captain); Kieran Dowling (manager); Donal McGovern (manager)
- Runners-up: Na Fianna; Donal Burke (captain); Niall Ó Ceallacháin (manager)

Tournament statistics
- Matches played: 33
- Goals scored: 93 (2.82 per match)
- Points scored: 1217 (36.88 per match)

The 2021 Dublin Senior Hurling Championship was the 134th and current staging of the Dublin Senior Hurling Championship since its establishment by the Dublin County Board in 1887. The championship began on 3 September 2021 and ended on 13 November 2021.

Cuala entered the championship as the defending champions, however, they were beaten by Kilmacud Crokes at the semi-final stage.

The final was played on 13 November 2021 at Parnell Park in Dublin, between Kilmacud Crokes and Na Fianna, in what was their first ever meeting in a final. Kilmacud Crokes won the match by 4–26 to 2-25 - the first ever to be settled in extra time - to claim their sixth championship title overall and a first title since 2014.

== Team changes ==
There were no changes in personnel in terms of the participating teams as a result of the suspension of promotion/relegation in 2020 due to the impact of the COVID-19 pandemic on Gaelic games.

== Group stage ==
=== Group 1 ===
| Team | Matches | | | | Score | | | Pts |
| Team | Pld | W | D | L | For | Against | Diff | Pts |
|---|---|---|---|---|---|---|---|---|
| Na Fianna | 3 | 3 | 0 | 0 | 90 | 46 | 44 | 6 |
| Craobh Chiaráin | 3 | 2 | 0 | 1 | 81 | 68 | 13 | 4 |
| Whitehall Colmcille | 3 | 1 | 0 | 2 | 55 | 91 | -36 | 2 |
| Ballinteer St John's | 3 | 0 | 0 | 3 | 50 | 71 | -21 | 0 |

=== Group 2 ===
| Team | Matches | | | | Score | | | Pts |
| Team | Pld | W | D | L | For | Against | Diff | Pts |
|---|---|---|---|---|---|---|---|---|
| Lucan Sarsfields | 3 | 3 | 0 | 0 | 78 | 47 | 31 | 6 |
| St Jude's | 3 | 2 | 0 | 1 | 70 | 68 | 2 | 4 |
| St Vincent's | 3 | 1 | 0 | 2 | 80 | 59 | 21 | 2 |
| Setanta | 3 | 0 | 0 | 3 | 40 | 94 | -54 | 0 |

=== Group 3 ===
| Team | Matches | | | | Score | | | Pts |
| Team | Pld | W | D | L | For | Against | Diff | Pts |
|---|---|---|---|---|---|---|---|---|
| Kilmacud Crokes | 3 | 3 | 0 | 0 | 93 | 47 | 46 | 6 |
| Cuala | 3 | 2 | 0 | 1 | 80 | 70 | 10 | 4 |
| St Brigid's | 3 | 1 | 0 | 2 | 71 | 70 | 1 | 2 |
| Thomas Davis | 3 | 0 | 0 | 3 | 37 | 94 | -57 | 0 |

=== Group 4 ===
| Team | Matches | | | | Score | | | Pts |
| Team | Pld | W | D | L | For | Against | Diff | Pts |
|---|---|---|---|---|---|---|---|---|
| Ballyboden St Enda's | 3 | 3 | 0 | 0 | 92 | 46 | 46 | 6 |
| St Oliver Plunketts/Eoghan Ruadh | 3 | 2 | 0 | 1 | 73 | 57 | 16 | 4 |
| Faughs | 3 | 1 | 0 | 2 | 59 | 61 | -2 | 2 |
| Scoil Uí Chonaill | 3 | 0 | 0 | 3 | 27 | 87 | -60 | 0 |

== Relegation stage ==
=== Playoffs ===
| 16 October 2021 Semi-final | Ballinteer St John's | 2-19 - 2-17 | Setanta | O'Toole Park |
| | | | | Referee: Tom Tansey |

| 17 October 2021 Semi-final | Thomas Davis | 1-11 - 3-21 | Scoil Uí Chonaill | Parnell Park |
| | | | | Referee: Paul Faughnan |

| Final | Setanta | v | Thomas Davis | Parnell Park |

== Knockout stage ==
=== Quarter-finals ===
| 16 October 2021 Quarter-final | Na Fianna | 0-26 - 0-23 | St Jude's | Parnell Park |
| | | | | Referee: Mark Ryan |

| 16 October 2021 Quarter-final | Craobh Chiaráin | 1-16 - 1-20 | Lucan Sarsfields | Parnell Park |
| | | | | Referee: Peter Smyth |

| 17 October 2021 Quarter-final | Kilmacud Crokes | 1-26 - 0-19 | St Oliver Plunketts/Eoghan Ruadh | Parnell Park |
| | | | | Referee: PJ Murray |

| 17 October 2021 Quarter-final | Ballyboden St Enda's | 0-28 - 1-27 | Cuala | Parnell Park |
| | | | | Referee: Dave Aston |

=== Semi-finals ===
| 31 October 2021 Semi-final | Lucan Sarsfields | 0-12 - 1-20 | Na Fianna | Parnell Park |
| | | | | Referee: Thomas Gleeson |

| 31 October 2021 Semi-final | Cuala | 1-13 - 1-18 | Kilmacud Crokes | Parnell Park |
| | | | | Referee: Sean Stack |

=== Final ===
| 13 November 2021 Final | Kilmacud Crokes | 4-26 - 2-25 (AET) | Na Fianna | Parnell Park |
| | R Hayes 1-14 (8f, 1 65), O O’Rorke 1-3, A Considine, F Whitley 1-1 each, C Conway 0-3, L McMullan 0-2, D Purcell, D Crowe 0-1 each. | Report | D Burke 2-7 (1-0 pen; 6 f), S Currie 0-8 (1 sideline), AJ Murphy, M Murphy 0-2 each, P Feeney, S Barrett, AJ Murphy, L Rushe, P O’Dea, K Burke 0-1 each. | Referee: Chris Mooney |
