= 2025 Dublin Senior Hurling Championship =

Annual hurling competition season

2025 Dublin Senior 1 Hurling Championship
- Dates: 18 July - 25 October 2025
- Teams: 12
- Sponsor: Go-Ahead Ireland
- Champions: Na Fianna (3rd title); Dónal Burke (captain); Aidan Downes (manager)
- Runners-up: Lucan Sarsfields; Charlie Carter (manager)
- Relegated: Craobh Chiaráin; St Oliver Plunketts/Eoghan Ruadh

The 2025 Dublin Senior 1 Hurling Championship was the 138th staging of the Dublin Senior 1 Hurling Championship since its establishment by the Dublin County Board in 1887. The draw for the group stage pairings took place in April 2025. The championship ran from 18 July to 25 October 2025.

Na Fianna entered the championship as the defending champions.

The final was played on 25 October 2025 at Parnell Park in Donnycarney, between Na Fianna and Lucan Sarsfields in what was their first ever meeting in the final. Na Fianna won the match by 1–20 to 0–22 to claim their third consecutive championship title.

== Format change ==
In February 2025, the Dublin CCC announced a change in format for that year's championship. The number of participating teams increased from 10 to 12, with the participants drawn into two groups of six teams. The top four placed teams in each group qualified for the quarter-finals. The relegation playoffs saw the team finishing 5th in each group playing against the team finishing 6th in the opposite group and the two losing teams were relegated.

== Team changes ==
=== To Championship ===
Promoted from the Dublin Senior 2 Hurling Championship

- Naomh Barróg
- St Oliver Plunketts/Eoghan Ruadh

== Group 1 ==
=== Group 1 table ===
Quarter-finalist Relegation playoff

Team	Matches				Score			Pts
Team	Pld	W	D	L	For	Against	Diff	Pts
Na Fianna	5	5	0	0	155	95	60	10
Lucan Sarsfields	5	4	0	1	116	88	28	8
Ballyboden St Enda's	5	3	0	2	142	100	42	6
Naomh Barróg	5	2	0	3	113	108	-5	4
St Jude's	5	1	0	4	94	128	-34	2
Craobh Chiaráin	5	0	0	5	71	172	-101	0

== Group 2 ==
=== Group 2 table ===
Quarter-finalist Relegation playoff

Team	Matches				Score			Pts
Team	Pld	W	D	L	For	Against	Diff	Pts
Kilmacud Crokes	5	4	0	1	148	96	52	8
St Brigid's	5	4	0	1	133	119	14	8
St Vincent's	5	3	0	2	132	109	23	6
Cuala	5	2	0	3	129	117	12	4
Whitehall Colmcille	5	1	1	3	99	131	-32	3
St Oliver Plunketts/ER	5	0	1	4	113	182	-69	1

== Relegation stage ==
=== Relegation playoffs ===
27 September 2025 Playoff	St Jude's	0-25 - 0-23	St Oliver Plunketts/Eoghan Ruadh	O'Toole Park
	C Nolan 0-11 (7f, 1 ‘65’), J McManus 0-4, K Lahiff 0-3, R O’Reilly 0-2 (2f), C McLoughlin 0-2, S Wiley, D O’Connor, C Graham 0-1 each.	Report	G Ryan 0-12 (6f), B McSweeney 0-3 (1 s/line), I Popa 0-3, J O’Shea, S Clerkin 0-2 each, B McDonnell 0-1.

27 September 2025 Playoff	Whitehall Colmcille	2-23 - 2-22	Craobh Chiaráin	O'Toole Park
	P Spellacy 1-15 (1-11f, 0-1 ‘65’), C Sheedy 1-1, L Gannon 0-3, Enda O’Donnell, Eoghan O’Donnell 0-2 each.	Report	B Ryan 1-11 (0-8f, 0-2 ‘65’), D Kelly 1-1, S Brennan, R Burnett, J Murray 0-2 each, K McGouran (f), E Forbes, M Hayes, S Kelly 0-1 each.

== Knockout stage ==
=== Quarter-finals ===
27 September 2025 Quarter-final	St Vincent's	2-27 - 1-31 (aet)	Ballyboden St Enda's	Parnell Park
	J Hetherton 0-9 (6f); C Burke, D McBride 1-3 each; H Curley 0-3; S Williams, T Connolly 0-2 each; B Moorhouse-Carroll, C O’Neill, M Sweeney, B Bolger, D Peel 0-1 apiece.	Report	D Kenny 1-8 (0-6f, 0-1 ’65); N McMorrow 0-6; J Madden (1 sideline), F Murphy 0-3 each; S O’Connor, S McDonnell, N Ryan, D Gleeson 0-2 each; J Lambert, D Keogh, L McDwyer 0-1 apiece.

27 September 2025 Quarter-final	Kilmacud Crokes	3-27 - 0-18	Naomh Barróg	Parnell Park
	O O’Rorke 0-7 (5f); M Roche 1-3; B Kenny 1-2; A Considine, F Whitely 0-4 each; B Hayes 1-0; C Donovan, B Scanlan 0-2 each; C Conway, R Hayes, D Purcell 0-1 apiece.	Report	J Flanagan 0-13 (9f); A O’Donoghue 0-3; P Doyle, S Ryan 0-1 apiece.

28 September 2025 Quarter-final	Lucan Sarsfields	2-22 - 1-16	St Brigid's	Parnell Park
	P Crummey 1-3; C Keher 0-5 (1f); S Harkness 0-4 (3f); B Coffey (1f), C Walsh 0-3 each; D Mulqueen 1-0; C Crummey, L Garrigan, C Kennedy, C Dowling 0-1 apiece.	Report	C O’Sullivan 0-6 (1f, 1 sideline); P Winters 0-5 (3f, 1 ’65); C Ruane 1-0; J McGuirk (1f) 0-2; D Breslin, M Coyne, C Tierney 0-1 apiece.

28 September 2025 Quarter-final	Na Fianna	2-37 - 2-34 (aet)	Cuala	Parnell Park
	C Currie 0-13 (10f, 1 ’65); D Burke 1-4; J Meagher 0-5; S Currie 1-2; B Ryan, AJ Murphy 0-4 each; C McCarthy 0-2; C Stacey, P Feeney, T Gleeson 0-1 apiece.	Report	D O’Shea 0-12 (8f, 1 ’65); C O’Toole 1-3; S Moran (2f), D Treacy, J Conroy 0-4 each; D Twomey 1-0; G O’Toole 0-3; C O’Callaghan 0-2; J Twomey, C Sheanon 0-1 apiece.

=== Semi-finals ===
12 October 2025 Semi-final	Lucan Sarsfields	1-21 - 1-17	Ballyboden St Enda's	Parnell Park
	B Coffey 1-11 (1-0pen, 0-8f); P Crummey, C Keher, D Mulqueen 0-2 each; M Pappalardo, R Smith, C Dowling, C Kennedy 0-1 apiece.	Report	D Kenny 1-5 (1-0pen, 0-3f); C Dooley, J McGuire 0-2 each; S O’Connor, F Ryan (‘65’), N Ryan, P Dunleavy, D Gleeson, L McDwyer, F Murphy, T Hammersley 0-1 apiece.

12 October 2025 Semi-final	Na Fianna	2-22 - 0-17	Kilmacud Crokes	Parnell Park
	C Currie 0-10 (8f); AJ Murphy 1-3; D Burke 0-5 (0-1 sideline); B Ryan 1-1; P Feeney, S Currie, T Brennan 0-1 apiece.	Report	O O’Rorke 0-6 (4f); F Whitely 0-3; R Hayes 0-2; B Sheehy, D Crowe, B Hayes, A Considine, David Purcell, B Scanlan 0-1 apiece.

=== Final ===
25 October 2025 Final	Na Fianna	1-20 - 0-22	Lucan Sarsfields	Parnell Park
	C Currie 0-9 (7f), B Ryan 0-5, D Burke 1-0 (pen), S Currie 0-2, AJ Murphy 0-2, P O'Dea 0-1, C McCarthy 0-1	Report	B Coffey 0-10 (8f), C Keher 0-4, P Crummey 0-2, C Walsh 0-1, C Kennedy 0-1, D Flannery 0-1, C Crummey 0-1, K Costelloe 0-1, S McClelland 0-1 (0-1f).	Referee: R Hanley (St Brigid's)
