= 2026 Dublin Senior Hurling Championship =

Annual hurling competition season

2026 Dublin Senior 1 Hurling Championship
- Dates: 16 July - October 2026
- Teams: 12
- Sponsor: PTSB
- Champions: Kilmacud Crokes (8th title); Anthony Daly (manager)
- Runners-up: Cuala; Sean Moran (captain)

The 2026 Dublin Senior 1 Hurling Championship was the 139th staging of the Dublin Senior 1 Hurling Championship since its establishment by the Dublin County Board in 1887. The draw for the group stage pairings took place in June 2026.

Na Fianna entered the championship as the defending champions.

The record champion Faughs is back in the championship after winning the Senior 2 Hurling Championship in 2025.

Kilmacud Crokes won the championship after beating Cuala 2-17 to 0-12 in the final for their 8th Dublin Senior championship.

== Format ==
The top four placed teams in each group qualify for the quarter-finals. The relegation playoffs sees the team finishing 5th in each group playing against the team finishing 6th in the opposite group and the two losing teams are relegated.

== Team changes ==
=== To Championship ===
Promoted from the Dublin Senior 2 Hurling Championship

- Erins Isle
- Faughs

=== From Championship ===
- St Oliver Plunketts/ER
- Craobh Chiaráin

== Group 1 ==
=== Group 1 table ===
Quarter-finalist Relegation playoff

Team	Matches				Score			Pts
Team	Pld	W	D	L	For	Against	Diff	Pts
Kilmacud Crokes	5	5	0	0	152	87	65	10
Na Fianna	5	4	0	1	153	100	53	8
Erins Isle	5	2	0	3	104	110	-6	4
Whitehall Colmcille	5	2	0	3	110	146	-36	4
St Vincent's	5	2	0	3	101	140	-39	4
Naomh Barróg	5	0	0	5	110	147	-37	0

=== Group 1 games ===
17 July Round 1	Naomh Barróg	0-24 - 2-19	Whitehall Colmcille	Parnell Park
	J Flanagan 0-14 (9f, 1 ‘65’), S Gallagher 0-4, D Moore 0-2, A O’Donohue, H Nolan, P Doyle, S Doyle 0-1 each.	Report	P Spellacy 0-8 (7f, 1 ‘65’), C Sheedy 1-3, Eoghan O’Donnell 1-0, Enda O’Donnell 0-3, D Gray 0-2 (2f), E Moran, J Rafferty, M Gainey 0-1 each.

17 July Round 1	Na Fianna	0-25 - 1-9	Erins Isle	Parnell Park
	S Currie 0-6 (3f, 1 ‘65’), D Burke 0-6 (3f, 1 ‘65’), W Wheatley 0-3, J Meagher, J Kavanagh, T Brennan 0-2 each, P O’Dea, D Clerkin, S Baxter, D Ryan 0-1 each.	Report	M Donohoe 0-4 (4f), N Fitzgerald 1-1, F Carroll, C Berrigan, T Gorman, C O’Hare 0-1 each.

18 July Round 1	St Vincent's	0-16 - 2-26	Kilmacud Crokes	Parnell Park
	St Vincent’s: B Bolger 0-5 (2f), J Mulcahy 0-3, H Curley, C Burke, M Cardiff 0-2 each, R Dunne, P Reynolds-Hand 0-1 each.	Report	B Hayes 2-1, R Hayes 0-5 (2 ‘65’, 1f), D Purcell 0-5, M Grogan, F O’Donohue 0-3 each, O O’Rorke 0-2 (2f), F Whitely, G Veale, A Considine 0-2 each, C O’Cathasaigh 0-1.

24 July Round 2	Erins Isle	2-22 - 0-17	St Vincent's	Parnell Park
	N Fitzgerald 1-3; T Gorman 1-2; M Donohoe (5f), C Berrigan 0-5 each; O Gaffney (2f) 0-3; C Donohoe (1f) 0-2; F Carroll, D Lynch 0-1 each	Report	B Bolger 0-7 (2f, 1 ’65); T Connolly (1f), C Burke 0-3 each; S Mulcahy 0-2; R Dunne, S Williams 0-1 each

24 July Round 2	Whitehall Colmcille	4-13 - 4-31	Na Fianna	Parnell Park
	Enda O’Donnell 2-4; P Spellacy (1-1f, 0-1 ’65), J Raftery 1-2 each; D Gray, Eoghan O’Donnell 0-2 each; C Sheedy 0-1	Report	D Burke 1-9 (0-6f, 0-1 ’65); D Meagher 1-2; B Ryan 0-5; S Barrett 1-1; J Meagher, W Wheatley 0-3 each; L Stacey 1-0; C McHugh, P O’Dea 0-2 each; S Baxter, S Currie, G Spollen, T Brennan 0-1 each

25 July Round 2	Kilmacud Crokes	2-28 - 3-16	Naomh Barróg	Parnell Park
	R Hayes 0-12 (8f, 1 ’65); F Donohue 2-1; T Stakelum, A Considine, D Purcell 0-3 each; C Ó Cathasaigh 0-2; B Hayes, C Conway, F Whitely, G Flannery 0-1 each	Report	J Flanagan 0-8 (6f); N Kidd 2-1; S Doyle 0-3; P Doyle 1-0; S Gallagher, D Moore, D Flood, E Ó Conghaile 0-1 each

14 August Round 3	St Vincent's	1-28 - 5-15	Whitehall Colmcille	Parnell Park
	B Bolger 0-10 (5f, 2 ’65); C Burke 1-2; T Connolly 0-4; M Sweeney, J Mulcahy 0-3 each; M Cardiff, J Hetherton (1f) 0-2 each; O Mulcahy, S Williams 0-1 apiece	Report	E O’Donnell 3-1; P Spellacy 0-8 (6f, 1 ’65); L Gannon 1-1; M O’Farrell 1-0 (own goal); C Sheedy 0-2; C Cummins, C Costello, M Noonan 0-1 apiece

14 August Round 3	Naomh Barróg	2-15 - 4-22	Na Fianna	Parnell Park
	J Flanagan 0-7 (5f); D Duggan 2-0; D Moore 0-2; S Duggan, A O’Donohoe, S Ryan, N Kidd, F McDonald, N Ring 0-1 apiece	Report	J Tierney 3-1; D Burke 0-10 (5f, 1 ’65); AJ Murphy 1-1; W Wheatley 0-3; P O’Dea, J Kavanagh 0-2 each; D Ryan, T Brennan, S Barrett 0-1 apiece

15 August Round 3	Kilmacud Crokes	1-23 - 2-12	Erins Isle	O'Toole Park
	R Hayes 0-11 (7f), A Hatt 1-1, C Conway, O O’Rorke 0-3 each, G Flannery 0-2, F Whitely, F Donohue, C Ó Riain 0-1 each	Report	M Donohoe 1-1 (0-1f), N Fitzgerald 1-1, O Gaffney 0-3 (3f), C O’Hare 0-3, L Lowndes 0-2, J Perry, J Clerkin 0-1 each.

28 August Round 4	Erins Isle	5-15 - 1-18	Naomh Barróg	Parnell Park
	M Donohoe 1-7 (0-6f, 0-1 ’65); O Gaffney 2-2; C Berigan 1-1; J Clerkin 1-0; G King, T Gorman 0-2 each; C O’Hare 0-1.	Report	J Flanagan 0-14 (9f, 2 ’65); D Moore 1-0; M Tierney, S Doyle 0-2 apiece.

28 August Round 4	Na Fianna	3-23 - 0-13	St Vincent's	Parnell Park
	S Barrett 2-4 (0-3f); S Currie 1-5 (1-0pen, 0-4f); D Burke (2f, 1 ’65), W Wheatley 0-3 each; P Feeney 0-2; J Tracey (f), S Burke, C Kelly, L Rushe, J Tierney, E McHugh 0-1 apiece.	Report	B Bolger 0-5 (4f); J Mulcahy, M Cardiff, B Murray 0-2 each; T Connolly, C Burke (f) 0-1 apiece.

29 August Round 4	Whitehall Colmcille	0-09 - 3-23	Kilmacud Crokes	O'Toole Park
	P Spellacy 0-5 (3f, 1 ‘65’), C Costello 0-3, S Dunphy 0-1.	Report	O O’Rorke 0-7 (5f), D Purcell 0-6, F Donohoe 2-0, B Kenny 1-0, S Purcell 0-3 (1f), C Conway 0-3, C Ó Cathasaigh, C Ó Riain, B Hayes, A Hatt 0-1 each.

11 September Round 5	Naomh Barróg	0-18 - 1-21	St Vincent's	Parnell Park
	J Flanagan 0-12 (9f); D Flood 0-3; A Ó Donnchú, S Doyle, N Kidd 0-1 a piece.	Report	B Bolger 0-11 (5f), J Mulcahy 1-5; C Burke, T Connolly 0-2 each; S Williams 0-1.

11 September Round 5	Erins Isle	0-16 - 0-21	Whitehall Colmcille	Parnell Park
	M Donohoe 0-6 (4f); C Berigan, T Gorman 0-3 each; C Donohoe (1f) 0-2; C O’Hare, O Gaffney 0-1 apiece.	Report	P Spellacy 0-9 (9f); Eoghan O’Donnell 0-5; C Sheedy 0-3; J Raftery 0-2; D Gray, C Cummins 0-1 apiece.

12 September Round 5	Kilmacud Crokes	4-17 - 1-16	Na Fianna	Parnell Park
	R Hayes 1-7 (0-5f, 0-1 ’65); D Purcell, A Considine 1-2 each; G Veale 1-0; B Kenny 0-2; D Lucey, T Stakelum, C Conway, F Donohoe 0-1 apiece.	Report	S Currie 0-10 (9f); E McHugh 1-0; J Tierney 0-2; W Wheatley, B Ryan, AJ Murphy, T Brennan 0-1 apiece.

== Group 2 ==
=== Group 2 table ===
Quarter-finalist Relegation playoff

Team	Matches				Score			Pts
Team	Pld	W	D	L	For	Against	Diff	Pts
Cuala	5	5	0	0	144	86	58	10
Lucan Sarsfields	5	4	0	1	135	96	39	8
St Jude's	5	2	0	3	110	136	-26	4
St Brigid's	5	2	0	3	104	119	-15	4
Ballyboden St Enda's	5	1	0	4	115	116	-1	2
Faughs	5	1	0	4	89	144	-55	2

=== Group 2 games ===
16 July Round 1	St Jude's	0-15 - 3-28	Cuala	O'Toole Park
	D McLoughlin 0-4, C Nolan 0-3 (3f), C Graham 0-3, C Martin 0-1 (f), S Wynne, E McCallion, D Malone, D O’Connor 0-1 each.	Report	D O’Shea 1-10 (0-8f), L Murphy 2-6 (0-4f), J Conroy 0-5, C O’Toole 0-3, E O’Callaghan, D O Floinn, J Twomey, D Treacy 0-1 each.

18 July Round 1	St Brigid's	1-22 - 1-17	Faughs	O'Toole Park
	K O'Sullivan 1-5, P Winters 0-8 (4f, 1 65), C O'Sullivan 0-3, J McGuirk, S Meagher, D Breslin 0-2 each.	Report	J O'Brien 0-7 (3f), A Mostyn 1-1, B Murray 0-3, C Bennett 0-2, N Fitzgibbon, C Nagle, C Brennan, C Dowd 0-1 each.

18 July Round 1	Lucan Sarsfields	3-10 - 1-14	Ballyboden St Enda's	Parnell Park
	B Coffey 0-5 (0-3f, 0-1 ‘65’), S Harkness, P Crummey 1-1 each, D Flannery 1-0, C Crummey, C Keher, D Meehan 0-1 each.	Report	D Gleeson 0-5, N McMorrow 0-3, J O’Driscoll 1-0, D Ormsby 0-1 (f), L McDwyer, J Madden, S O’Connor, F Codd, E Behan 0-1 each.

25 July Round 2	Ballyboden St Enda's	2-17 - 0-25	St Brigid's	O'Toole Park
	N McMorrow 0-6 (2f, 1 ‘65’), D Gleeson 1-2, A Nolan own goal, A Mellett, D Keogh 0-2 each, L Mulligan Lynch, N Ryan, J O’Driscoll, F Murphy, J Norris 0-1 each	Report	P Winters 0-15 (11f), K O’Sullivan 0-3, C O’Sullivan 0-2 (1 s/line), A Dunphy 0-2, A Nolan 0-1 (1f), S Maher, D Breslin 0-1 each

25 July Round 2	Cuala	2-19 - 0-23	Lucan Sarsfields	Parnell Park
	L Murphy 1-3 (0-1f); D O’Shea 0-6 (4f); C O’Toole 1-0; J Conroy, C Sheanon 0-3 each; C Groarke, D Ó Floinn, G O’Toole, K Kirwan 0-1 each	Report	B Coffey 0-7 (6f, 1 ’65); C Keher, K Costello, P Crummey 0-3 each; J Behan 0-2; S McClelland (f), C Crummey, M McCaffrey, M Coogan, C Dowling 0-1 each

25 July Round 2	Faughs	1-21 - 2-16	St Jude's	O'Toole Park
	J O’Brien 0-10 (8f), C Bennett 1-1, L Mostyn 0-3, B Murray 0-2, E MacNamara 0-1 (f), S McDonald, C Dowd, C Nagle, A Mostyn 0-1 each	Report	C Martin 0-6 (6f), C Graham 2-0, C Mangan 0-3, J McManus 0-2, C Nolan 0-1 (f), D Sutcliffe, J Carty, D McLoughlin, D O’Connor 0-1 each

15 August Round 3	Faughs	2-15 - 1-24	Ballyboden St Enda's	O'Toole Park
	C Bennett 1-8 (0-7f), B Murray 1-1, J O’Brien 0-3 (1f), C McCabe, C Nagle, L Mostyn 0-1 each	Report	D Kenny 1-11 (0-8f, 0-2 ‘65’), D Gleeson, T Hammersley 0-3 each, J Lambert, L McDwyer, N McMorrow 0-2 each, J Kennedy 0-1

15 August Round 3	St Brigid's	1-15 - 0-26	Cuala	Parnell Park
	P Winters 1-3 (1-2f); J Hannon 0-4 (1 ’65); C O’Sullivan 0-3; K O’Sullivan, D Breslin 0-2 each; A Dunphy 0-1	Report	D O’Shea 0-9 (7f); J Conroy 0-6; L Murphy 0-3 (1f); S Roche 0-2; C Groarke, D Ó Floinn, J Malone, C Sheanon, J Twomey, K Kirwan 0-1 apiece

15 August Round 3	St Jude's	3-14 - 0-28	Lucan Sarsfields	Parnell Park
	C Martin 1-3 (0-3f); C Nolan 1-2 (1-1f); D Sutcliffe 1-1; J Carty, C Mangan 0-2 each; D McLoughlin, E McCallion, E McLoughlin, C Graham 0-1 apiece	Report	B Coffey 0-13 (9f, 2 ’65); C Keher 0-4; C Dowling 0-3; C Kennedy 0-2; S Coffey, J Bellew, K Costello, P Crummey, C Walsh, S Harkness 0-1 apiece

29 August Round 4	Cuala	3-25 - 0-10	Faughs	Parnell Park
	D O’Shea 0-7 (5f); C Groarke 0-6; C O’Toole 1-2; K Kirwan 0-4; C Cronin, C Spain 1-0 each; J Conroy, S Moran 0-2 each; D Ó Floinn, S Roche 0-1 apiece.	Report	J O’Brien 0-4 (2f, 1 ’65); C Dowd (1f), L Mostyn 0-2 each; C Bennett, O Walsh 0-1 apiece.

29 August Round 4	Lucan Sarsfields	2-23 - 1-14	St Brigid's	O'Toole Park
	B Coffey 0-7 (4f), C Kennedy 1-2, C Walsh 1-0, P Crummey 0-3, C Keher, K Costello 0-2 each, S McClelland 0-1 (f), J Bellew, C Crummey, C Dowling, S Harkness, M Coogan, S Bolger 0-1 each.	Report	P Winters 1-5 (1-3f), S Maher, K O’Sullivan 0-2 each, C Doyle, A McGuirk, C O’Sullivan, J O’Neill, T Hannon 0-1 each.

29 August Round 4	Ballyboden St Enda's	1-25 - 4-17	St Jude's	Parnell Park
	D Kenny 0-7 (4f, 1 ’65); N McMorrow 1-3; J Roche 0-4; D Gleeson, J Lambert, D Durkin 0-2 each; C Dooley, F Codd, J Madden, J Norris, A Mellett 0-1 apiece.	Report	C Martin 1-8 (0-6f, 0-1 ’65); D Sutcliffe 1-2; C Graham, E McLoughlin 1-0 each; C Nolan (f), C Mangan, J Carty, D McLoughlin, J McManus, D O’Connor, F Wardick 0-1 apiece.

12 September Round 5	Ballyboden St Enda's	1-17 - 2-16	Cuala	Parnell Park
	D Kenny 1-1 (0-1f); D Gleeson 0-4; N McMorrow (2f) 0-3; S O’Connor, L McDwyer 0-2 each; D Durkin, C Dooley, J Maddden, E Behan, A Mellett 0-1 apiece.	Report	D O’Shea 0-8 (5f, 1 ’65); G O’Toole 2-0; D Ó Floinn 0-3; S Moran (1f) 0-2; S Roche, C Cronin, K Kirwan 0-1 apiece.

12 September Round 5	Faughs	1-12 - 4-23	Lucan Sarsfields	O'Toole Park
	L Mostyn 0-3, E McNamara 1-0 (pen), J O’Brien 0-2 (1f), B Murray 0-2, C Kenny, O Walsh, C O’Mahony, C Bennett, D Pryce 0-1 each.	Report	P Crummey 1-2, C Crummey, K Costello 0-4 each, C Dowling 1-1, S Harkness, S Bolger 1-0 each, B Coffey 0-3 (2f), C Keher 0-3, C Kennedy 0-2, P Rigney, L Mooney, M McCaffrey, C Walsh 0-1 each.

12 September Round 5	St Brigid's	0-19 - 0-21	St Jude's	O'Toole Park
	P Winters 0-9 (7f, 1 ‘65’), C O’Sullivan 0-5, J Hannon, A Dunphy, D Breslin, B Moran, T Hannon 0-1 each.	Report	C Martin 0-5 (5f), D McLoughlin, J McManus, C Graham 0-3 each, J Carty, M Maguire 0-2 each, M Hade, F Wardick, E McLoughlin 0-1 each.

== Relegation stage ==
=== Relegation playoffs ===
26 September Playoff	St Vincent's	3-24 - 4-17 (a.e.t.)	Faughs	O'Toole Park
	B Bolger 0-9 (5f, 1 ‘65’), J Mulcahy 1-3, M Sweeney 0-4, K Ward 1-1, S McCarry 1-0, D Perry, B Moorehouse-Carroll, R Dunne, T Connolly, O Mulcahy, S Williams, H Curley 0-1 each.	Report	J O’Brien 0-6 (5f, 1 ‘65’), L Mostyn 1-2, C O’Mahony 1-1 (1-0f), A Mostyn 1-1, B Murray 1-0, E McNamara 0-2 (1f), C Nagle 0-2, C McCabe, N Fitzgibbon, O Walsh 0-1.

26 September Playoff	Ballyboden St Enda's	0-23 - 0-17	Naomh Barróg	O'Toole Park
	N McMorrow 0-8 (5f), C Dooley 0-4 (2f), F Codd, A Mellett, J Madden 0-2 each, D Gleeson 0-1 (f), J Lambert, D Kenny, L McDwyer, J Roche 0-1 each.	Report	J Flanagan 0-13 (11f, 2 ‘65’), E Hart, P Doyle, S Doyle, D Moore 0-1 each.

== Knockout stage ==
=== Quarter-finals ===
26 September Quarter-final	Cuala	1-25 - 2-11	Whitehall Colmcille	Parnell Park
	C O’Toole 1-2, D O’Shea (2f, 2 ’65), D Treacy 0-5 each; L Murphy 0-4 (3f); D Ó Floinn, C Sheanon, J Conroy, K Kirwan 0-2 each; G O’Toole 0-1.	Report	P Spellacy 0-7 (6f); E O’Donnell 1-1; L Gannon 1-0; C Sheedy, M Gainey, D Gray 0-1 apiece.

26 September Quarter-final	Kilmacud Crokes	2-22 - 0-17	St Brigid's	Parnell Park
	O O’Rorke 1-1 (0-1f), R Hayes 0-4 (4f); F Whitely, D Purcell 0-3 each; A Considine 1-0; C Conway, C Ó Riain, T Stakelum 0-2 each; F Donohoe, B Hayes, B Kenny, E Gibbons, E Keys 0-1 apiece.	Report	P Winters 0-9 (6f); C O’Sullivan 0-6; J O’Connell, T Hannon 0-1 apiece.

27 September Quarter-final	Lucan Sarsfields	5-20 - 1-12	Erins Isle	Parnell Park
	B Coffey 1-8 (1-6f, 0-1 ’65); P Crummey 1-1; C Kennedy 0-4; K Costello, C Dowling, M Coogan 1-0 each; C Keher, C Walsh, D Flannery 0-2 each; C Crummey 0-1.	Report	C Donohoe 1-3 (0-1 sideline); M Donohue (2f), O Gaffney 0-3 each; G King 0-2, T Gorman 0-1.

27 September Quarter-final	Na Fianna	0-26 - 2-18	St Jude's	Parnell Park
	S Currie 0-12 (10f, 1 pen); AJ Murphy 0-4; J Meagher 0-3; B Ryan, T Brennan 0-2 each; J Tierney, C Currie, J Kavanagh 0-1 apiece.	Report	C Graham 2-1; C Martin 0-4 (3f); C Nolan 0-3 (2f); C Mangan, J McManus (1f), D McLoughlin 0-2 each; S Wynne, J Carty, D Sutcliffe, M Maguire 0-1 apiece.

=== Semi-finals ===
11 October Semi-final	Na Fianna	1-19 - 2-21	Cuala	Parnell Park
	S Currie 0-5 (3f); C Currie 0-4 (4f); AJ Murphy 1-1; B Ryan 0-2; P Feeney, W Wheatley, J Meagher, T Brennan, D Clerkin, D Burke, C Stacey 0-1 apiece.	Report	L Murphy 0-8 (5f); C O’Toole 1-4 (0-1 sideline); C Cronin 1-1; J Malone, S Moran 0-2 each; A English, C O’Callaghan, D O’Shea (f), C Groarke 0-1 apiece.

11 October Semi-final	Kilmacud Crokes	0-20 - 0-19	Lucan Sarsfields	Parnell Park
	A Considine, D Purcell 0-3 each; O O’Rorke (2f), G Veale 0-2 each; E Gibbons (f), C Ó Riain, C Ó Cathasaigh, B Hayes, C Conway, F Whitely, R Hayes (f), B Kenny, D Geraghty, B Lynch 0-1 apiece.	Report	B Coffey 0-7 (5f, 1 sideline); C Crummey 0-3; J Bellew, L Garrigan 0-2 each; S McClelland, C Keher, C Dowling, P Crummey, D Flannery 0-1 apiece.

=== Final ===
24 October Final	Cuala	0-12 - 2-17	Kilmacud Crokes	Parnell Park
	Liam Murphy (0-5, 5f), Donal O'Shea (0-4, 3f), Conor Groarke (0-1), Jamie Conroy (0-1), Kevin Kirwan (0-1)	Report	Ronan Hayes (1-6, 3f), Oisín O'Rorke (1-0), Conal Ó Riain (0-3), Finnian Donohoe (0-3), Fergal Whitely (0-2), Brian Hayes (0-1), Alex Considine (0-1), Dara Purcell (0-1)
