= 2022 Dublin Senior Football Championship =

Gaelic football tournament

Tournament details
- County: Dublin
- Province: Leinster
- Year: 2022
- Trophy: Clerys Cup
- Date: 05 August 2022 - 16 October 2022
- Teams: 16 Senior 1; 16 Senior 2
- Defending champions: Kilmacud Crokes

Winners
- Champions: Kilmacud Crokes
- Qualify for: Leinster Club SFC

Runners-up
- Runners-up: Na Fianna

Other
- Website: Dublin GAA.ie

The 2022 Dublin Senior Football Championship was the 136th edition of Dublin GAA's premier gaelic football tournament for senior clubs in County Dublin, Ireland. 32 teams participate (16 in Senior 1 and 16 in Senior 2), with the winner of Senior 1 representing Dublin in the Leinster Senior Club Football Championship.

Kilmacud Crokes defeated Na Fianna to win the Senior 1 Championship.

St Vincents won the Senior 2 Championship and were promoted along with finalists St Sylvester's to Senior 1. They replaced Clontarf and Round Towers Lusk who were relegated to the 2023 SFC2.

Naomh Barróg won the 2022 I.F.C. and were promoted along with I.F.C. finalists Fingal Ravens to Senior 2. They replaced Trinity Gaels and Parnells who were relegated to the 2023 I.F.C.

== Senior 1 ==
=== Group 1 ===
Team	Pld	W	D	L	PF	PA	PD	Pts
Kilmacud Crokes	3	3	0	0	62	22	+40	6
Ballinteer St John's	3	1	1	1	37	36	+1	4
Templeogue Synge Street	3	0	2	1	38	63	-25	2
Raheny	3	0	1	2	32	48	-16	1

Round 1

6 August 2022 Round 1	Templeogue Synge Street	1-10(13) – (13) 0-13	Ballinteer St John's	O'Toole Park

6 August 2022 Round 1	Kilmacud Crokes	1-13 (16) – (5) 0-05	Raheny	Parnell Park

Round 2

19 August 2022 Round 2	Raheny	1-13 (16) – (16) 3-07	Templeogue Synge Street	Parnell Park

20 August 2022 Round 2	Ballinteer St John's	0-08 (8) – (12) 0-12	Kilmacud Crokes	Parnell Park

Round 3

4 September 2022 Round 3	Kilmacud Crokes	3-25(34) – (9) 1-06	Templeogue Synge Street	Parnell Park

4 September 2022 Round 3	Ballinteer St John's	1-13 (16) – (11) 1-08	Raheny	O'Toole Park

=== Group 2 ===
Team	Pld	W	D	L	PF	PA	PD	Pts
Ballyboden St. Enda's	3	2	1	0	57	40	+17	5
Cuala	3	2	1	0	53	43	+10	5
Ballymun Kickhams	3	1	0	2	43	50	-7	2
Clontarf	3	0	0	3	37	57	-20	0

Round 1

5 August 2022 Round 1	Ballymun Kickhams	0-15 (15) – (14) 0-14	Clontarf	Parnell Park

6 August 2022 Round 1	Ballyboden St. Enda's	0-16 (16) – (16) 1-13	Cuala	O'Toole Park

Round 2

20 August 2022 Round 2	Ballyboden St. Enda's	4-10 (22) – (17) 2-11	Ballymun Kickhams	Parnell Park

20 August 2022 Round 3	Cuala	4-11 (23) – (16) 3-07	Clontarf	O'Toole Park

Round 3

4 September 2022 Round 3	Ballyboden St. Enda's	1-16 (19) – (7) 0-07	Clontarf	O'Toole Park

4 September 2022 Round 3	Ballymun Kickhams	0-11 (11) – (14) 2-08	Cuala	Parnell Park

=== Group 3 ===
Team	Pld	W	D	L	PF	PA	PD	Pts
Na Fianna	3	3	0	0	56	24	+32	6
Thomas Davis	3	2	0	1	48	50	-2	4
St Judes	3	1	0	2	43	39	+4	2
Skerries Harps	3	0	0	3	36	70	-34	0

Round 1

6 August 2022 Round 1	Thomas Davis	0-10 (10) – (15) 1-12	Na Fianna	Parnell Park

6 August 2022 Round 1	St Judes	1-17 (20) – (10) 0-10	Skerries Harps	Balgriffen

Round 2

19 August 2022 Round 2	Skerries Harps	4-09 (21) – (23) 2-17	Thomas Davis	St Margarets

19 August 2022 Round 2	St Judes	0-09 (9) – (14) 2-08	Na Fianna	Parnell Park

Round 3

3 September 2022 Round 3	Thomas Davis	2-09 (15) – (14) 2-08	St Judes	O'Toole Park

3 September 2022 Round 3	Na Fianna	4-15 (27) – (5) 0-05	Skerries Harps	Parnell Park

=== Group 4 ===
Team	Pld	W	D	L	PF	PA	PD	Pts
Whitehall Colmcille	3	2	0	1	67	51	+16	4
Castleknock	3	2	0	1	59	45	+14	4
Lucan Sarsfields	3	2	0	1	55	48	+7	4
Round Towers Lusk	3	0	0	3	27	64	-37	0

Round 1

5 August 2022 Round 1	Lucan Sarsfields	1-11 (14) – (22) 2-16	Castleknock	Monastery Road

6 August 2022 Round 1	Round Towers Lusk	1-08 (11) – (26) 2-20	Whitehall Colmcille	Garristown

Round 2

20 August 2022 Round 2	Whitehall Colmcille	3-16 (25) – (23) 3-14	Castleknock	Parnell Park

20 August 2022 Round 2	Lucan Sarsfields	1-21 (24) – (10) 1-07	Round Towers Lusk	Balgriffin

Round 3

3 September 2022 Round 3	Lucan Sarsfields	1-14 (17) – (16) 1-13	Whitehall Colmcille	O'Toole Park

3 September 2022 Round 3	Round Towers Lusk	0-06 (6) – (14) 1-11	Castleknock	Parnell Park

=== Knockout stages ===
Quarter-Finals		Semi-Finals		Final
Kilmacud Crokes	0-14
Cuala	1-09	Kilmacud Crokes	0-12
Thomas Davis	1-12	Thomas Davis	1-03
Castleknock	0-05			Kilmacud Crokes	0-11
Na Fianna	1-12			Na Fianna	0-10
Whitehall Colmcille	1-11	Na Fianna	1-14
Ballyboden St Enda's	3-15	Ballyboden St Enda's	0-07
Ballinteer St John's	3-10

=== Quarter-finals ===
17 September 2022 Quarter Final	Na Fianna	1-12 (15) – (14) 1-11	Whitehall Colmcille	Parnell Park

17 September 2022 Quarter Final	Kilmacud Crokes	0-14 (14) – (12) 1-09	Cuala	Parnell Park

18 September 2022 Quarter Final	Ballyboden St. Enda's	3-15 (24) – (19) 3-10	Ballinteer St John's	Parnell Park

18 September 2022 Quarter Final	Thomas Davis	1-12 (15) – (5) 0-05	Castleknock	Parnell Park

=== Semi-finals ===
1 October 2022 Semi Final	Na Fianna	1-14 (17) – (7) 0-07	Ballyboden St. Enda's	Parnell Park

2 October 2022 Semi Final	Kilmacud Crokes	0-12 (12) – (6) 1-03	Thomas Davis	Parnell Park

=== Final ===
16 October 2022 Final	Kilmacud Crokes	0-11 (11) – (10) 0-10	Na Fianna	Parnell Park
		Report		TV: TG4

=== Relegation play-offs ===
18 September 2022 Relegation play-off	Raheny	1-11 (14) – (9) 0-09	Clontarf	St Margarets

17 September 2022 Relegation play-off	Skerries Harps	4-11 (23) – (11) 1-08	Round Towers Lusk	Naul

== Senior 2 ==
=== Group 1 ===
Team	Pld	W	D	L	PF	PA	PD	Pts
St Oliver Plunketts	3	2	0	1	54	50	+4	4
St Pat's Donabate	3	1	1	1	44	43	+1	3
Naomh Mearnóg	3	1	1	1	41	55	-14	3
Naomh Ólaf	3	1	0	2	45	36	+9	2

Round 1

6 August 2022 Round 1	Naomh Ólaf	3-17 (26) – (13) 2-07	St Oliver Plunketts

6 August 2022 Round 1	Naomh Mearnóg	1-16 (19) – (19) 2-13	St Pat's Donabate

Round 2

20 August 2022 Round 2	St Pat's Donabate	0-10 (10) – (8) 0-08	Naomh Ólaf

20 August 2022 Round 2	St Oliver Plunketts	4-13 (25) – (9) 0-09	Naomh Mearnóg

Round 3

3 September 2022 Round 3	Naomh Ólaf	1-08 (11) – (13) 1-10	Naomh Mearnóg

3 September 2022 Round 3	St Oliver Plunketts	2-10 (16) – (15) 2-09	St Pat's Donabate

=== Group 2 ===
Team	Pld	W	D	L	PF	PA	PD	Pts
St Vincents	3	3	0	0	69	33	+36	6
St Mary's	3	2	0	1	49	53	-4	4
Ballyboughal	3	1	0	2	38	44	-6	2
Parnells	3	0	0	3	35	61	-26	0

Round 1

6 August 2022 Round 1	Parnells	1-06 (9) – (12) 2-06	Ballyboughal

6 August 2022 Round 1	St Vincents	3-15 (24) – (10) 0-10	St Mary's

Round 2

19 August 2022 Round 2	Ballyboughal	0-12 (12) – (17) 0-17	St Vincents

20 August 2022 Round 1	St Mary's	4-09 (21) – (15) 3-06	Parnells

Round 3

3 September 2022 Round 3	Parnells	2-05 (11) – (28) 4-16	St Vincents

3 September 2022 Round 3	Ballyboughal	1-11 (14) – (18) 5-03	St Mary's

=== Group 3 ===
Team	Pld	W	D	L	PF	PA	PD	Pts
St Maurs	3	2	1	0	65	52	+13	5
Fingallians	3	2	0	1	44	44	+0	4
Erins Isle	3	1	1	1	45	45	+0	3
St Anne's	3	0	0	3	47	60	-13	0

Round 1

6 August 2022 Round 1	Fingallians	0-14 (14) – (13) 1-10	Erins Isle

6 August 2022 Round 1	St Anne's	1-19 (22) – (28) 3-19	St Maurs

Round 2

19 August 2022 Round 2	Erins Isle	1-13 (16) – (15) 0-15	St Anne's

20 August 2022 Round 2	St Maurs	3-12 (21) – (14) 2-08	Fingallians

Round 3

3 September 2022 Round 3	Fingallians	3-07 (16) – (10) 2-04	St Anne's

3 September 2022 Round 1	Erins Isle	1-13 (16) – (16) 0-16	St Maurs

=== Group 4 ===
Team	Pld	W	D	L	PF	PA	PD	Pts
St Sylvester's	3	3	0	0	55	34	+21	6
St Brigid's	3	1	1	1	48	32	+16	3
Round Towers Clondalkin	3	1	1	1	56	54	+2	3
Trinity Gaels	3	0	0	3	33	72	-39	0

Round 1

6 August 2022 Round 1	Trinity Gaels	0-07 (7) – (27) 5-12	St Brigid's

6 August 2022 Round 1	Round Towers Clondalkin	1-14 (15) – (24) 2-18	St Sylvester's

Round 2

20 August 2022 Round 2	Trinity Gaels	2-10 (16) – (21) 4-13	Round Towers Clondalkin

20 August 2022 Round 2	St Brigid's	0-07 (7) – (11) 0-11	St Sylvester's

Round 3

3 September 2022 Round 3	St Sylvester's	2-14 (20) – (10) 0-10	Trinity Gaels

3 September 2022 Round 2	St Brigid's	1-11 (14) – (14) 2-08	Round Towers Clondalkin

=== Quarter-finals ===
17 September 2022 Quarter Final	St Oliver Plunketts	2-13 (19) – (13) 2-07	St Mary's

17 September 2022 Quarter Final	St Brigid's	8-11 (35) – (14) 3-06	St Maurs

17 September 2022 Quarter Final	St Sylvester's	0-14 (14) – (7) 0-07	Fingallians

18 September 2022 Quarter Final	St Vincents	2-18 (24) – (9) 1-06	St Pat's Donabate

=== Semi-finals ===
1 October 2022 Semi Final	St Vincents	2-12 (18) – (13) 1-10	St Oliver Plunketts

2 October 2022 Semi Final	St Sylvester's	1-11 (14) – (11) 0-11	St Brigid's

=== Final ===
16 October 2022 Final	St Vincents	1-08 (11) – (8) 0-08	St Sylvester's	Parnell Park
		Report

=== Relegation play-offs ===
17 September 2022 Relegation play-off	St Anne's	2-10 (16) – (13) 0-13	Trinity Gaels

17 September 2022 Relegation play-off	Naomh Ólaf	1-15 (18) – (14) 1-11	Parnells
