= 2022 Dublin Senior Hurling Championship =

Hurling tournament

- Dates: 19 July - 23 October 2022
- Teams: 10
- Sponsor: Go-Ahead
- Champions: Kilmacud Crokes (7th title); Caolan Conway (captain); Kieran Dowling (manager); Donal McGovern (manager)
- Runners-up: Na Fianna; Tom Gleeson (captain); Niall Ó Ceallacháin (manager)

The 2022 Dublin Senior Hurling Championship was the 135th and current staging of the Dublin Senior Hurling Championship since its establishment by the Dublin County Board in 1887. The championship began on 19 July 2022 and ended on 23 October 2022.

Kilmacud Crokes entered the championship as the defending champions.

The final was played on 13 November 2022 at Parnell Park in Dublin, between Kilmacud Crokes and Na Fianna, it was the second year in a row they met in the final. Kilmacud Crokes won the match by 0-20 to 0-17, to win the championship two years in a row, their seventh championship title overall .

== Senior 1 ==
=== Group 1 ===
Team	Pld	W	D	L	PF	PA	PD	Pts
Cuala	5	5	0	0	115	88	+27	10
Ballyboden St. Enda's	5	4	0	1	106	77	+29	8
Na Fianna	5	3	0	2	84	87	-3	6
St Oliver Plunketts	5	2	0	3	89	107	-18	4
St Judes	5	1	0	4	69	104	-35	2
Bye	5	0	0	5	0	0	0	0

Round 1

20 July 2022 Round 1	Na Fianna	3-20 (29) – (20) 1-17	St Judes	Parnell Park

20 July 2022 Round 1	Ballyboden St. Enda's	8-18 (42) – (20) 1-17	St Oliver Plunketts	Parnell Park

20 July 2022 Round 1	Cuala	Win – Loss	Bye

Round 2

23 July 2022 Round 2	St Judes	1-12 (15) – (21) 1-18	Ballyboden St. Enda's	O'Toole Park

23 July 2022 Round 2	St Oliver Plunketts	3-16 (25) – (29) 2-23	Cuala	O'Toole Park

23 July 2022 Round 2	Na Fianna	Win – Loss	Bye

Round 3

13 August 2022 Round 3	St Oliver Plunketts	2-19 (25) – (15) 0-15	St Judes	O'Toole Park

13 August 2022 Round 3	Cuala	1-25 (28) – (21) 2-15	Na Fianna	Parnell Park

13 August 2022 Round 3	Ballyboden St. Enda's	Win – Loss	Bye

Round 4

27 August 2022 Round 4	St Judes	2-13 (19) – (29) 2-23	Cuala	Parnell Park

27 August 2022 Round 4	Ballyboden St. Enda's	0-20 (20) – (13) 0-13	Na Fianna	Parnell Park

27 August 2022 Round 4	St Oliver Plunketts	Win – Loss	Bye

Round 5

10 September 2022 Round 5	Cuala	2-23 (29) – (23) 2-17	Ballyboden St. Enda's	Parnell Park

10 September 2022 Round 5	St Oliver Plunketts	1-16 (19) – (21) 2-15	Na Fianna	O'Toole Park

10 September 2022 Round 5	St Judes	Win – Loss	Bye

=== Group 2 ===
Team	Pld	W	D	L	PF	PA	PD	Pts
Kilmacud Crokes	5	5	0	0	110	77	+33	10
St Vincents	5	3	1	1	99	93	+6	8
Lucan Sarsfields	5	3	0	2	87	82	+5	6
St Brigid's	5	2	1	2	81	87	-6	4
Craobh Chiaráin	5	1	0	4	67	105	-38	2
Bye	5	0	0	5	0	0	0	0

Round 1

19 July 2022 Round 1	Lucan Sarsfields	0-21 (21) – (24) 2-18	St Vincents	O'Toole Park

20 July 2022 Round 1	Kilmacud Crokes	0-27 (27) – (14) 0-14	Craobh Chiaráin	O'Toole Park

20 July 2022 Round 1	St Brigid's	Win – Loss	Bye

Round 2

23 July 2022 Round 2	Craobh Chiaráin	1-14 (17) – (25) 1-22	Lucan Sarsfields	Parnell Park

23 July 2022 Round 2	St Vincents	2-16 (22) – (22) 1-19	St Brigid's	Parnell Park

23 July 2022 Round 2	Kilmacud Crokes	Win – Loss	Bye

Round 3

13 August 2022 Round 3	St Vincents	2-20 (26) – (19) 2-13	Craobh Chiaráin	Parnell Park

13 August 2022 Round 3	St Brigid's	1-15 (18) – (25) 0-25	Kilmacud Crokes	O'Toole Park

13 August 2022 Round 3	Lucan Sarsfields	Win – Loss	Bye

Round 4

27 August 2022 Round 4	Craobh Chiaráin	2-11 (17) – (27) 1-24	St Brigid's	O'Toole Park

27 August 2022 Round 4	Kilmacud Crokes	1-24 (27) – (18) 0-18	Lucan Sarsfields	O'Toole Park

27 August 2022 Round 4	St Vincents	Win – Loss	Bye

Round 5

10 September 2022 Round 5	St Vincents	3-18 (27) – (29) 2-25	Kilmacud Crokes	Parnell Park

10 September 2022 Round 5	St Brigid's	1-11 (14) – (23) 2-17	Lucan Sarsfields	O'Toole Park

10 September 2022 Round 5	Craobh Chiaráin	Win – Loss	Bye

=== Quarter-finals ===
25 September 2022 Quarter Final	St Vincents	0-17 (17) – (22) 1-19	Na Fianna	Parnell Park

25 September 2022 Quarter Final	Ballyboden St. Enda's	2-21 (27) – (23) 0-23	Lucan Sarsfields	Parnell Park

=== Semi-finals ===
8 October 2022 Semi Final	Kilmacud Crokes	1-21 (24) – (15) 0-15	Ballyboden St. Enda's	Parnell Park

9 October 2022 Semi Final	Cuala	0-17 (17) – (24) 2-18	Na Fianna	Parnell Park

=== Final ===
23 October 2022 Final	Kilmacud Crokes	0-20 (20) – (17) 0-17	Na Fianna	Parnell Park
		Report
