= Conor McHugh =

Irish Gaelic footballer and hurler

Personal information
- Native name: Conchúr Mac Aodha (Irish)
- Born: April 1994 (age 32) Dublin, Ireland
- Occupation: Sales director

Sport
- Sport: Gaelic football
- Position: Centre-forward
Club
- Years: Club
- 2012-present: Na Fianna
Club titles
	Football	Hurling
Dublin titles	0	2
Leinster titles	0	1
All-Ireland titles	0	1
College
- Years: College
- Dublin City University
College titles
- Sigerson titles: 1
Inter-county
- Years: County
- 2015-2021: Dublin
Inter-county titles
- Leinster titles: 5
- All-Irelands: 4
- NFL: 4
- All Stars: 0

Conor McHugh (born April 1994) is an Irish Gaelic footballer and hurler. At club level, he plays with Na Fianna and at inter-county level has lined out at various levels as a dual player with Dublin.

== Career ==
McHugh first played club hurling and Gaelic football at juvenile and underage levels with Na Fianna. He progressed to adult level and won back-to-back Dublin SHC medals in 2023 and 2024. McHugh later claimed a Leinster Club SHC title, before lining out at full-back in the 2-23 to 0-20 defeat of Sarsfields in the 2025 All-Ireland club final.

At inter-county level, McHugh first played for Dublin as a dual player at minor level. He won consecutive Leinster MHC medals in 2011 and 2012 but faced defeat in the subsequent All-Ireland deciders. McHugh also claimed a Leinster MFC medal and was at corner-forward for Dublin's defeat of Meath in the 2012 All-Ireland minor final. He progressed to under-21 level and won an All-Ireland U21FC title in 2014, as well as being named Player of the Year.

McHugh was a member of the extended training panel of the Dublin senior football team across seven seasons from 2015 to 2021. He made 20 appearances across the National League and Championship but failed to break onto the team or the matchday panel. In spite of this, McHugh claimed four All-Ireland SFC medals as part of a four-in-a-row between 2015 and 2018. His last appearance for the team was in 2021.

== Honours ==
Dublin City University

- Sigerson Cup: 2015

Na Fianna

- All-Ireland Senior Club Hurling Championship: 2025
- Leinster Senior Club Hurling Championship: 2024
- Dublin Senior Hurling Championship: 2023, 2024
- Dublin Intermediate Football Championship: 2017

Dublin

- All-Ireland Senior Football Championship: 2015, 2016, 2017, 2018
- Leinster Senior Football Championship: 2015, 2016, 2017, 2018, 2021
- National Football League: 2015, 2016, 2018, 2021
- O'Byrne Cup: 2017
- All-Ireland Under-21 Football Championship: 2014
- Leinster Under-21 Football Championship: 2014, 2015
- All-Ireland Minor Football Championship: 2012
- Leinster Minor Football Championship: 2012
- Leinster Minor Hurling Championship: 2011, 2012
