= Brian Ryan (hurler) =

Irish hurler

Personal information
- Native name: Brian Ó Riain (Irish)
- Nickname: The bear
- Born: 1998 (age 27–28) Ballysheedy, Limerick, Ireland
- Occupation: Tax associate

Sport
- Sport: Hurling
- Position: Left wing-forward
Clubs
- Years: Club
- 2015-2022 2023-present: South Liberties; Na Fianna
Club titles
- Dublin titles: 2
- Leinster titles: 1
- All-Ireland Titles: 1
College
- Years: College
- DCU Dóchas Éireann
College titles
- Fitzgibbon titles: 0
Inter-county*
| Years | County | Apps (scores) |
| 2019-2021 2024-present | Limerick; Dublin | 0 (0-00) |
Inter-county titles
- Leinster titles: 1
- All-Irelands: 1
- NHL: 1
- All Stars: 0
- *Inter County team apps and scores correct as of 10:22, 23 January 2025.

Brian Ryan (born 1998) is an Irish hurler. At club level, he plays with Na Fianna, having previously played with South Liberties. At inter-county level, Ryan lined out at various levels with Limerick before transferring to the Dublin senior hurling team.

== Career ==
Ryan played hurling at all levels during his time as a student at Ardscoil Rís. He was part of the school's senior team that won the Harty Cup title in 2016 after an 0–11 to 0–08 defeat of Our Lady's Secondary School in the final. Ryan was also part of the team that was beaten by St Kieran's College in the 2016 All-Ireland final.

At club level, Ryan began his career with South Liberties. He transferred to the Na Fianna in Dublin in 2023. Ryan won a Dublin SHC medal after a defeat of Ballyboden St Enda's in 2023, before claiming a second following the club's retention of the title the following year. He added a Leinster Club SHC title to his collection, before lining out in the 2–23 to 0–20 defeat of Sarsfields in the 2025 All-Ireland club final.

Ryan first appeared on the inter-county scene with Limerick during a two-year tenure with the minor team. During that time he lined out in consecutive Munster MHC final defeats by Tipperary, as well as a defeat by the same team in the 2016 All-Ireland MHC final. Ryan won a Munster U25HC medal in 2017, before lining out with the under-21 team in 2018.

After joining the senior team's training panel in late 2019, Ryan was first included on a Limerick panel during the pre-season Munster SHL in January 2020. He was a member of the extended panel for the duration of the season as Limerick claimed National League, Munster SHC and All-Ireland SHC honours. Ryan was again included on the panel in 2021 but left midway through the season. He earned a call-up to the Dublin senior hurling team in December 2024.

== Career statistics ==
As of match played 16 May 2021.

| Team | Year | National League | | | Munster | | All-Ireland | | Total | |
| Team | Year | Division | Apps | Score | Apps | Score | Apps | Score | Apps | Score |
|---|---|---|---|---|---|---|---|---|---|---|
| Limerick | 2020 | Division 1A | 3 | 0-02 | 0 | 0-00 | 0 | 0-00 | 3 | 0-02 |
| Limerick | 2021 | Division 1A | 1 | 0-00 | 0 | 0-00 | 0 | 0-00 | 1 | 0-00 |
| Career total | | | 4 | 0-02 | 0 | 0-00 | 0 | 0-00 | 4 | 0-02 |

== Honours ==
Ardscoil Rís

- Dr. Harty Cup (1): 2016

Na Fianna

- All-Ireland Senior Club Hurling Championship (1): 2025
- Leinster Senior Club Hurling Championship (1): 2024
- Dublin Senior Hurling Championship (2): 2023, 2024

Limerick

- All-Ireland Senior Hurling Championship (1): 2020
- Munster Senior Hurling Championship (1): 2020
- National Hurling League (1): 2020
