= 2025 All-Ireland Senior Club Hurling Championship final =

2025 All-Ireland Senior Club Hurling Championship Final
- Event: 2024-25 All-Ireland Senior Club Hurling Championship
Sarsfields	Na Fianna
0-20	2-23
- Date: 19 January 2025
- Venue: Croke Park, Dublin
- Referee: L. Gordon (Galway)
- Attendance: 31,267

The 2025 All-Ireland Senior Club Hurling Championship final was a hurling match that was played at Croke Park on 19 January 2025 to determine the winners of the 2024-25 All-Ireland Senior Club Hurling Championship, the 54th season of the All-Ireland Senior Club Hurling Championship, a tournament organised by the Gaelic Athletic Association for the champion clubs of the four provinces of Ireland. The match was shown live on TG4.

The final was contested by Sarsfields and Na Fianna. Na Fianna captained by Dónal Burke won the match by 2–23 to 0–20 to claim a first All-Ireland Senior Club Hurling Championship title.

== Details ==
19 January 2025 Final	Sarsfields (Cork)	0–20 – 2–23	Na Fianna (Dublin)	Croke Park
13:30 IWT (UTC±0)	A Myers 0–10 (0–8 f), J O’Connor 0–5, D Kearney 0–3 (0–1 65), D Hogan, B Murphy 0–1 each.	Report	T Brennan 2–1, C Currie 0–6 (0–5 f, 0–1 65), AJ Murphy 0–5, D Burke (0–1 f), B Ryan 0–3 each, C Stacey 0–2, S Currie, J Meagher, P O’Dea 0–1 each.	Attendance: 31,267; Referee: L Gordon (Galway)
