= Dublin Under 21 Hurling Championship =

- Irish: Craobh Faoi 21 Iomáint; Bhaile Átha Cliath
- Title holders: Na Fianna
- Sponsors: Evening Herald

The Dublin Under 21 Hurling Championship is an annual Gaelic Athletic Association club competition between the under-21 hurlers of Dublin clubs. The current (2017) under 21 champions of Dublin are Na Fianna who beat Ballyboden St Enda's 2-17 to 2-14 at O'Toole Park on 25 November 2017.

== 2017 Under 21 Hurling Final ==
25 November 2017	Na Fianna	2-17 - 2-14	Ballyboden St Enda's	O'Toole Park; Referee: Peter Smyth (O'Tooles); Man of the Match: Colin Currie
25 November 2017	Colin Currie 1-7 (0-5f), Shane Barrett 0-3, Peter Feeney 1-0, Gavin King (1 sl), Donal Burke, Sean Ryan 0-2 each, Ciaran Casserly 0-1	Report	Conor O'Donoghue 1-6 (1-0 pen, 0-5f, 1 '65), Aidan Mellett 1-1, Shane Kennedy 0-3f, Kevin Desmond and Conor Kennedy 0-2 each	O'Toole Park; Referee: Peter Smyth (O'Tooles); Man of the Match: Colin Currie

== Roll of Honour ==
Year	Winner	Score	Opponent	Score
2025	Kilmacud Crokes	3-19	Cuala	0-17
2024	Lucan Sarsfields	3-10	Faughs	1-08
2023	Kilmacud Crokes	0-27 (3 penalties)	Lucan Sarsfields	0-27 (1 penalty)
2022				
2021				
2020				
2019	Lucan Sarsfields	4-10	Na Fianna	1-09
2018	Na Fianna	3-18	St Vincents	1-18
2017	Na Fianna	2-17	Ballyboden St. Enda's	2-14
2016	Na Fianna	0-18	Kilmacud Crokes	0-15
2015	Kilmacud Crokes	1-17	Na Fianna	1-13 AET
2014	Lucan Sarsfields			
2013	Ballyboden St Enda's			
2012				
2011	Ballyboden St Enda's			
2010	Ballyboden St Enda's			
2009	Cuala			
2008				
2007	Ballyboden St Enda's			
2006	Ballyboden St Enda's			
2005				
2004	O'Tooles			
2003	DIT			
2002				
2001	UCD			
2000				
1999				
1998				
1997				
1996				
1995	Craobh Chiaráin		O'Tooles	
1994	St Vincent's			
1993	St Vincent's			
1992	Craobh Chiaráin		Kilmacud Crokes	
1991	Kilmacud Crokes		Craobh Chiaráin	
1990	Commercials			
1989	Kilmacud Crokes			
1988	St Oliver Plunkett's			
1987	Erin's Hope			
1986	Crumlin			
1985	Crumlin			
1984	Craobh Chiaráin			
1983	St Vincent's			
1982	Craobh Chiaráin			
1981	O'Tooles		Good Counsel	
1980	St Vincent's			
1979	St Vincent's			
1978	St Vincent's			
1977	Erin's Hope			
1976	UCD			
1975	Eoghan Ruadhs			
1974	O'Tooles			
1973	Erin's Hope			
1972	Crumlin		Cuala Casements	
1971	St Vincent's		Cuala Casements	
1970	Erin's Hope		Cuala Casements	
1969	UCD			
1968	St Columba's			
1967	St Vincent's			
1966	St Columba's			
1965	Aer Corps			
1964	Ballyfermot De La Salle			

== Under 21 B Championship ==
Year	Winner	Score	Opponent	Score
2025	Ballinteer St John's	1-17	Faughs	2-07
2024	Naomh Barróg	1-21	Commercials	1-19
2023	St Oliver Plunkett's/Eoghan Ruadh	1-16	Faughs	2-11
2022				
2021				
2020				
2019	St Oliver Plunkett's		Whitehall Colmcille	
2018	St Oliver Plunkett's	2-14	Ballinteer St John's	1-16
2017	Whitehall Colmcille			
2016	Thomas Davis	1-17	Clontarf	2-12

== Under 21 C Hurling Championship ==
Year	Winner	Score	Opponent	Score
2025	Naomh Barróg	2-14	Naomh Mearnóg	1-14
2024	Naomh Mearnóg	1-17	Castleknock	0-19
2023	Clontarf	1-16	St. Jude's	0-13
2022				
2021				
2020				
2019	Naomh Mearnóg		Craobh Chiaráin	
2018	Craobh Chiaráin	0-18	Naomh Mearnóg	1-13
2017	St Sylvester's			
2016	St Maur's		St Sylvester's	

== Under 21 D Hurling Championship ==
Year	Winner	Score	Opponent	Score
2025	O'Tooles	2-14	Skerries Harps	2-09
2024	Cuala	2-14	Skerries Harps	4-03
2023	O'Tooles	2-15	Round Towers Clondalkin	2-08

== Under 21 E Hurling Championship ==
Year	Winner	Score	Opponent	Score
2025	St Oliver Plunkett's/Eoghan Ruadh	3-23	Round Towers, Lusk	2-18
2024	Na Fianna	3-14	Naomh Ólaf	0-11
2023	St Peregrines	3-16	Ballyboden St. Enda's	0-11

== Under 21 F Hurling Championship ==
Year	Winner	Score	Opponent	Score
2025	Ballyboden St. Enda's	1-16	Kilmacud Crokes	1-07
