= A. J. Murphy =

Irish hurler

Personal information
- Native name: Aindriú-Ó Murchú (Irish)
- Nickname: AJ
- Born: 1995 (age 30–31) Glasnevin, Dublin, Ireland
- Occupation: Secondary school teacher

Sport
- Sport: Hurling
- Position: Full-forward
Club
- Years: Club
- Na Fianna
Club titles
- Dublin titles: 3
- Leinster titles: 1
- All-Ireland Titles: 1
College(s)
- Years: College
- 2014-2016 2016-2019 2019-2021: Dublin Institute of Technology; Dublin City University; Trinity College Dublin
College titles
- Fitzgibbon titles: 0
Inter-county
- Years: County
- 2023-present: Dublin
Inter-county titles
- Leinster titles: 0
- All-Irelands: 0
- NHL: 0
- All Stars: 0

Andrew Jamieson-Murphy (born 1995) is an Irish hurler. At club level, he plays with Na Fianna and at inter-county level with the Dublin senior hurling team.

== Career ==
Murphy began his club career at juvenile and underage levels with Na Fianna. He won a Dublin MAHC title in 2012 after scoring a late goal in the 3–07 to 0–14 victory. Murphy subsequently progressed to adult level and won a Dublin SHC medal after a defeat of Ballyboden St Enda's in 2023, before claiming a second following the club's retention of the title the following year. He added a Leinster Club SHC title to his collection, before lining out in the 2–23 to 0–20 defeat of Sarsfields in the 2025 All-Ireland club final. Murphy ended the season by being named Club Huler of the Year.

At inter-county level, Murphy first played for Dublin at minor level in 2013. He later joined the under-21 team and won a Leinster U21HC medal in 2016 after a 2–15 to 1–10 win over Offaly in the final. Murphy joined the senior team in 2023.

== Honours ==
Na Fianna

- All-Ireland Senior Club Hurling Championship: 2025
- Leinster Senior Club Hurling Championship: 2024
- Dublin Senior Hurling Championship: 2023, 2024
- Dublin Minor A Hurling Championship: 2012

Dublin

- Leinster Under-21 Hurling Championship: 2016
