= Paul O'Dea (hurler) =

Irish hurler

Personal information
- Native name: Pól Ó Deá (Irish)
- Born: 1996 (age 29–30) Glasnevin, Dublin, Ireland

Sport
- Sport: Hurling
- Position: Left wing-back
Club
- Years: Club
- Na Fianna
Club titles
- Dublin titles: 0
College
- Years: College
- DCU Dóchas Éireann
College titles
- Fitzgibbon titles: 0
Inter-county*
Years	County	Apps (scores)
2021-present	Dublin	0 (0-00)
Inter-county titles
- Leinster titles: 0
- All-Irelands: 0
- NHL: 0
- All Stars: 0
- *Inter County team apps and scores correct as of 17:22, 5 July 2021.

Paul O'Dea (born 1996) is an Irish hurler who plays for Dublin Senior Championship club Na Fianna and at inter-county level with the Dublin senior hurling team. He usually lines out at wing-back.

== Career ==
A member of the Na Fianna club in Glasnevin, O'Dea first came to prominence on the inter-county scene with the Dublin minor team in 2014. He subsequently won a Leinster Under-21 Championship medal with the Dublin under-21 team, while simultaneously lining out with the DCU Dóchas Éireann in the Fitzgibbon Cup. O'Dea made his senior debut against Kilkenny during the 2021 National Hurling League.

== Career statistics ==
As of 3 July 2021

Team	Year	National League			Leinster		All-Ireland		Total	
Team	Year	Division	Apps	Score	Apps	Score	Apps	Score	Apps	Score
Dublin	2021	Division 1B	1	0-00	0	0-00	0	0-00	1	0-00
Total			1	0-00	0	0-00	0	0-00	1	0-00

== Honours ==
Dublin

- Leinster Under-21 Hurling Championship: 2016
