= Brian Ryan =

Brian Ryan may refer to:

- Brian Ryan (Glee), a character on the TV series Glee
- Brian Ryan (hurler) (born 1998), Irish hurler for Limerick
