= Jason Sherlock =

Irish former Gaelic footballer (born 1976)

Personal information
- Date of birth: 10 January 1976 (age 50)
- Place of birth: Dublin, Ireland
- Position: Striker

Senior career*
Years	Team	Apps	(Gls)
1994–1998	University College Dublin	110	(31)
1998–1999	Shamrock Rovers	31	(8)
Total		141	(39)

International career
1995	Republic of Ireland U21	1	(0)
- * Club domestic league appearances and goals

Jason Sherlock
Personal information
- Native name: Iasan Scorlóg (Irish)
- Born: 10 January 1976 (age 50) Dublin, Ireland
- Height: 5 ft 8 in (173 cm)

Sport
- Sport: Gaelic football
- Position: Full forward
Clubs
- Years: Club
- 2007–present ?–2007: St Oliver Plunketts ER; Na Fianna
Club titles
- Dublin titles: 3
- Leinster titles: 1
Inter-county**
Years	County	Apps (scores)
1995–2010	Dublin	62 (Championship)
Inter-county titles
- Leinster titles: 7
- All-Irelands: 1
- All Stars: 0
- **Inter County team apps and scores correct as of (16:31, 18 August 2006 (UTC)).

Jason Sherlock (born 10 January 1976 in Dublin) is an Irish former Gaelic footballer who played at senior level for the Dublin county team between 1995 and 2010. He played most of his club football for Na Fianna in Glasnevin in the northern suburbs of Dublin. Sherlock was on the Na Fianna team which won the Dublin Championship in 1999, 2000 and 2001. In January 2007, he transferred to the nearby St. Oliver Plunkett GAA.

== Early life ==
Sherlock was born and raised in Finglas on the northside of Dublin, the son of an Irish mother and a father from Hong Kong. He was educated at St. Vincent's C.B.S.

== Playing career ==
Sherlock made his debut for Dublin in their All-Ireland Senior Football Championship winning year, 1995, at the age of 19. He was responsible for crucial scores in the All-Ireland semi-final and final against Cork and Tyrone respectively.

Sherlock also played professional football for UCD and signed for Shamrock Rovers in August 1998 becoming the club's top goalscorer in his first season. While at UCD he scored 31 League of Ireland goals and made one appearance for the Republic of Ireland U21s.

During this time he played basketball before eventually deciding in 2003 to concentrate on football only; since then he has regained his place on the Dublin team. He was part of the 2005 Leinster Senior Football Championship-winning side that defeated Laois, scoring a total of two points in the final. He finished the 2005 Leinster and All-Ireland Championship with a total of one goal and six points compared to his total of one goal and one point in the 2005 National Football League. He finished the 2006 National Football League with one point due to a lack of first-team football. He scored the vital goal in the 2006 Leinster Final against Offaly and his experience was a telling factor throughout the game.

He was nominated for an All Star Award for his 2006 performances in the half forward line. Sherlock was rumoured to be seeking a transfer from Na Fianna to local rivals Plunkett's. Sherlock is now playing with St Oliver Plunketts.

Sherlock was on Dublin's winning team for the 2008 O'Byrne Cup winning team which defeated Longford in the final. He proved to be the hero of the game by coming on as a substitute and scoring two goals to steal victory against Longford in the dying moments of the game.

Dublin went on to win the Leinster championship for the fourth successive time, but were defeated by Tyrone in the All-Ireland quarter-final. Following Dublin's shattering defeat at the hands of Kerry in the All-Ireland quarter-final on 3 August 2009, Sherlock was thinking about hanging his boots up but Pat Gilroy persuaded him to stay. Despite his planned retirement Sherlock was considering giving the 2010 inter-county championship another go. In May 2010, Gilroy decided to call time on Sherlock after spending 15 years on the panel.

Sherlock announced his retirement from football on 1 June 2013.

He was seen in a funny video with members of An Garda Síochána during the 2023 St. Patrick's Day Parade in New York, much to the amusement of onlookers.

=== National League appearances ===
#	Date	Venue	Opponent	Score	Result	Competition
1	10 February 2001	Parnell Park, Dublin	Roscommon	-	0-10 : 0-12	National Football League Round 1
1	3 March 2002	Parnell Park, Dublin	Westmeath	-	3-13 : 1-16	National Football League Round 4
2	24 March 2002	Parnell Park, Dublin	Roscommon	-	0-16 : 2-12	National Football League Round 6
3	31 March 2002	Tuam Stadium, Galway	Galway	-	1-12 : 1-12	National Football League Round 7
4	2 February 2003	Parnell Park, Dublin	Armagh	-	0-7 : 1-15	National Football League Round 1
5	2 March 2003	Fitzgerald Stadium, Killarney	Kerry	-	0-14 : 2-11	National Football League Round 4
6	9 March 2003	Parnell Park, Dublin	Cork	0-2	0-8 : 0-16	National Football League Round 5
7	23 March 2003	Dr. Hyde Park, Roscommon	Roscommon	-	0-17 : 0-14	National Football League Round 6
8	6 April 2003	Parnell Park, Dublin	Galway	-	0-12 : 1-9	National Football League Round 7
9	1 February 2004	Parnell Park, Dublin	Tyrone	0-2	0-9 : 0-8	National Football League Round 1
10	8 February 2004	McHale Park, Castlebar	Mayo	-	0-3 : 1-10	National Football League Round 2
11	15 February 2004	Parnell Park, Dublin	Kerry	0-1	0-12 : 1-12	National Football League Round 3
12	7 March 2004	Cusack Park, Mullingar	Westmeath	0-1	0-15 : 0-10	National Football League Round 4
13	14 March 2004	Brewster Park, Enniskillen	Fermanagh	0-1	0-12 : 0-12	National Football League Round 5
14	21 March 2004	Parnell Park, Dublin	Cork	-	0-9 : 0-9	National Football League Round 6
15	4 April 2004	Parnell Park, Dublin	Longford	1-0	2-12 : 2-9	National Football League Round 7
16	5 February 2005	Parnell Park, Dublin	Mayo	-	2-13 : 1-15	National Football League Round 1
17	13 February 2005	Healy Park, Omagh	Tyrone	-	0-9 : 1-10	National Football League Round 2
18	5 March 2005	Austin Stack Park, Tralee	Kerry	-	2-11 : 2-13	National Football League Round 3
19	20 March 2005	Parnell Park, Dublin	Donegal	-	1-11 : 0-13	National Football League Round 5
20	26 March 2005	Páirc Uí Rinn, Cork	Cork	1-0	1-6 : 0-18	National Football League Round 6
21	3 April 2005	O'Connor Park, Tullamore	Offaly	0-1	1-13 : 2-6	National Football League Round 7
22	5 February 2006	Healy Park, Omagh	Tyrone	-	1-9 : 1-6	National Football League Round 1
23	12 February 2006	Parnell Park, Dublin	Monaghan	-	0-7 : 1-11	National Football League Round 2
24	4 March 2006	Parnell Park, Dublin	Offaly	-	1-10 : 3-2	National Football League Round 3
25	9 April 2006	Fitzgerald Stadium, Killarney	Kerry	0-1	0-13 : 0-13	National Football League Round 7
26	10 March 2007	Parnell Park, Dublin	Cork	0-1	1-13 : 0-7	National Football League Round 4
27	24 March 2007	Parnell Park, Dublin	Fermanagh	0-1	3-15 : 0-7	National Football League Round 5
28	1 April 2007	McHale Park, Castlebar	Mayo	-	0-9 : 0-10	National Football League Round 6
29	8 April 2007	Parnell Park, Dublin	Kerry	1-2	2-7 : 1-12	National Football League Round 7
30	2 February 2008	Parnell Park, Dublin	Westmeath	-	1-7 : 1-5	National Football League Round 1
31	1 March 2008	Kingspan Breffni Park, Cavan	Cavan	-	1-9 : 0-7	National Football League Round 3
32	23 March 2008	Parnell Park, Dublin	Monaghan	0-1	1-10 : 0-13	National Football League Round 4
33	13 April 2008	Crossmaglen, Armagh	Armagh	0-2	1-10 : 3-13	National Football League Round 5
34	20 April 2008	Parnell Park, Dublin	Meath	0-1	0-13 : 2-6	National Football League Round 7
35	26 April 2008	Páirc Tailteann, Meath	Westmeath	0-2	0-10 : 0-15	National Football League Division 2 Final
36	31 January 2009	Croke Park, Dublin	Tyrone	0-2	1-16 : 1-18	National Football League Round 1
31	15 February 2009	Pearse Stadium, Salthill	Galway	-	0-13 : 3-12	National Football League Round 2
32	8 March 2009	Ballyshannon, Donegal	Donegal	-	0-13 : 1-8	National Football League Round 3

=== Championship appearances ===
#	Date	Venue	Opponent	Score	Result	Competition
1	19 June 1995	Páirc Tailteann, Navan	Louth	0-1	0-19 : 2-5	Leinster Championship Quarter final
2	10 July 1995	Páirc Tailteann, Navan	Laois	1-0	1-13 : 0-9	Leinster Championship Semi final
3	31 July 1995	Croke Park, Dublin	Meath	0-2	1-18 : 1-8	Leinster Championship final
4	20 August 1995	Croke Park, Dublin	Cork	1-0	1-12 : 0-12	All Ireland Championship Semi final
5	17 September 1995	Croke Park, Dublin	Tyrone	-	1-10 : 0-12	All Ireland Championship final
6	18 June 1996	Cusack Park, Westmeath	Westmeath	0-1	1-18 : 0-11	Leinster Championship Quarter final
7	9 July 1996	Croke Park, Dublin	Louth	-	1-9 : 0-8	Leinster Championship Semi final
8	30 July 1996	Croke Park, Dublin	Meath	-	0-8 : 0-10	Leinster Championship final
9	17 June 1997	Croke Park, Dublin	Meath	-	1-10 : 1-13	Leinster Championship Quarter final
10	7 June 1998	St. Conleth's Park, Newbridge	Kildare	-	0-10 : 0-10	Leinster Championship Quarter final
11	28 June 1998	Croke Park, Dublin	Kildare	-	1-8 : 0-12	Leinster Championship Quarter final replay
12	16 June 1999	Croke Park, Dublin	Louth	-	2-15 : 0-14	Leinster Championship Quarter final
13	11 July 1999	Croke Park, Dublin	Laois	-	1-11 : 0-14	Leinster Championship Semi final
14	18 July 1999	Croke Park, Dublin	Laois	-	0-16 : 1-11	Leinster Championship Semi final replay
15	27 July 1999	Croke Park, Dublin	Meath	-	0-12 : 1-14	Leinster Championship final
16	16 June 2000	Croke Park, Dublin	Wexford	1-2	2-20 : 1-8	Leinster Championship Quarter final
17	5 July 2000	Croke Park, Dublin	Westmeath	0-1	1-14 : 0-11	Leinster Championship Semi final
18	30 July 2000	Croke Park, Dublin	Kildare	0-2	0-14 : 0-14	Leinster Championship final
19	12 August 2000	Croke Park, Dublin	Kildare	0-3	0-12 : 2-11	Leinster Championship final replay
20	27 May 2001	Croke Park, Dublin	Longford	0-2	2-19 : 1-13	Leinster Championship Quarter final
21	17 June 2001	Croke Park, Dublin	Offaly	0-1	1-12 : 0-13	Leinster Championship Semi final
22	15 July 2001	Croke Park, Dublin	Meath	0-1	0-14 : 2-11	Leinster Championship final
23	22 July 2001	Croke Park, Dublin	Sligo	-	3-17 : 0-12	Qualifiers Round 4
24	4 August 2001	Semple Stadium, Thurles	Kerry	0-1	2-11 : 1-14	All-Ireland Quarter final
25	11 August 2001	Semple Stadium, Thurles	Kerry	0-1	1-12 : 2-12	All-Ireland Quarter final replay
26	1 June 2002	Dr. Cullen Park, Wexford	Wexford	0-2	0-15 : 1-10	Leinster Championship Quarter final
27	23 June 2002	Croke Park, Dublin	Meath	-	2-11 : 0-10	Leinster Championship Semi final
28	14 July 2002	Croke Park, Dublin	Kildare	-	2-13 : 2-11	Leinster Championship Final
29	5 August 2002	Croke Park, Dublin	Donegal	-	2-8 : 0-14	All-Ireland Quarter final
30	17 August 2002	Croke Park, Dublin	Donegal	-	1-14 : 0-7	All-Ireland Quarter final replay
31	1 September 2002	Croke Park, Dublin	Armagh	-	1-13 : 1-14	All-Ireland Semi final
32	28 June 2003	St. Tiernach's Park, Derry	Derry	1-3	3-9 : 1-9	Qualifiers Round 2
33	5 July 2003	Croke Park, Dublin	Armagh	0-2	0-11 : 0-15	Qualifiers Round 3
34	6 June 2004	Croke Park, Dublin	Westmeath	0-4	0-12 : 0-14	Leinster Championship Quarter final
35	12 June 2004	Parnell Park, Dublin	London	0-1	3-24 : 0-6	Qualifiers Round 1
36	3 July 2004	Carrick on Shannon, Leitrim	Leitrim	0-2	1-13 : 0-4	Qualifiers Round 2
37	10 July 2004	O'Moore Park, Portlaoise	Longford	0-2	1-17 : 0-11	Qualifiers Round 3
38	1 August 2004	Croke Park, Dublin	Roscommon	1-4	1-14 : 0-13	Qualifiers Round 4
39	14 August 2004	Croke Park, Dublin	Kerry	1-0	1-8 : 1-15	All Ireland Quarter final
40	15 May 2005	Croke Park, Dublin	Longford	0-1	2-23 : 0-10	Leinster Championship Preliminary Quarter final
41	5 June 2005	Croke Park, Dublin	Meath	-	1-12 : 1-10	Leinster Championship Quarter final
42	19 June 2005	Croke Park, Dublin	Wexford	1-0	1-17 : 2-10	Leinster Championship Semi final
43	17 July 2005	Croke Park, Dublin	Laois	0-2	0-14 : 0-13	Leinster Championship Final
44	13 August 2005	Croke Park, Dublin	Tyrone	0-2	1-14 : 1-14	All Ireland Quarter final
45	27 August 2005	Croke Park, Dublin	Tyrone	0-1	1-14 : 2-18	All Ireland Quarter final replay
46	4 June 2006	Pearse Park, Longford	Longford	-	1-12 : 0-13	Leinster Championship Quarter final
47	25 June 2006	Croke Park, Dublin	Laois	-	3-17 : 0-12	Leinster Championship Semi final
48	16 July 2006	Croke Park, Dublin	Offaly	1-1	1-15 : 0-9	Leinster Championship Final
49	13 August 2006	Croke Park, Dublin	Westmeath	0-1	1-12 : 0-5	All Ireland Quarter final
50	27 August 2006	Croke Park, Dublin	Mayo	1-0	2-12 : 1-16	All-Ireland Semi final
51	17 June 2007	Croke Park, Dublin	Meath	-	0-16 : 0-12	Leinster Championship Quarter final replay
52	24 June 2007	Croke Park, Dublin	Offaly	0-1	1-12 : 0-10	Leinster Championship Semi final
53	15 July 2007	Croke Park, Dublin	Laois	-	3-14 : 1-14	Leinster Championship Final
54	11 August 2007	Croke Park, Dublin	Derry	0-2	0-18 : 0-15	All-Ireland Quarter final
55	26 August 2007	Croke Park, Dublin	Kerry	-	0-16 : 1-15	All-Ireland Semi final
56	8 June 2008	Croke Park, Dublin	Louth	0-2	1-22 : 0-12	Leinster Championship Quarter final
57	29 June 2008	Croke Park, Dublin	Westmeath	0-1	0-13 : 1-8	Leinster Championship Semi final
58	20 July 2008	Croke Park, Dublin	Wexford	0-3	3-23 : 0-9	Leinster Championship Final
59	16 August 2008	Croke Park, Dublin	Tyrone	-	1-8 : 3-14	All-Ireland Quarter final
60	7 June 2009	Croke Park, Dublin	Meath	-	0-14 : 0-12	Leinster Championship Quarter final
61	28 June 2009	Croke Park, Dublin	Westmeath	0-6	4-26 : 0-11	Leinster Championship Semi final
62	12 July 2009	Croke Park, Dublin	Kildare	1-1	2-15 : 0-18	Leinster Championship Final
63	3 August 2009	Croke Park, Dublin	Kerry	-	1-7 : 1-24	All-Ireland Quarter final

== Coaching career ==
In November 2022, Sherlock was announced as performance coach of the Westmeath senior footballers, working under the management of Dessie Dolan.

== Honours ==
- League of Ireland First Division
  - UCD 1994/95
- League of Ireland First Division Shield
  - UCD 1994/95
- Leinster Senior Cup (football): 2
  - UCD 1994/95, 1995/96
