= Cian Boland =

Irish hurler

Personal information
- Native name: Cian Ó Beollain (Irish)
- Nickname: Ciano
- Born: 1995 (age 30–31) Dublin, Ireland
- Height: 5 ft 10 in (178 cm)

Sport
- Sport: Hurling
- Position: Right corner-forward
Club
- Years: Club
- 2013–2023: St. Oliver Plunkett's/Eoghan Ruadh
College
- Years: College
- 2013–2018: Dublin City University
Inter-county*
Years	County	Apps (scores)
2015–2023	Dublin	15 (0-20)
- *Inter County team apps and scores correct as of 21:50, 4 July 2021.

Cian Boland (born 1995) is an Irish hurler who plays for Dublin Senior Championship club St. Oliver Plunkett's/Eoghan Ruadh and at inter-county level with the Dublin senior hurling team. He currently lines out as a right corner-forward.

== Career ==
A member of the St. Oliver Plunkett's/Eoghan Ruadh club, Boland first came to prominence on the inter-county scene on the Dublin minor team that won back-to-back Leinster Minor Championships in 2011 and 2012. He subsequently won a Leinster Under-21 Championship with the Dublin under-21 team as well as lining out with DCU Dóchas Éireann in the Fitzgibbon Cup. Boland was still a member of the under-21 team when he was added to the Dublin senior hurling team, making his debut during the 2015 Walsh Cup.

== Career statistics ==
As of 3 July 2021.

Team	Year	National League			Leinster		All-Ireland		Total	
Team	Year	Division	Apps	Score	Apps	Score	Apps	Score	Apps	Score
Dublin	2015	Division 1A	5	1-02	1	0-01	3	0-01	9	1-04
Dublin	2016	Division 1A	0	0-00	0	0-00	0	0-00	0	0-00
Dublin	2017	Division 1A	4	0-01	0	0-00	0	0-00	4	0-01
Dublin	2018	Division 1A	2	0-02	3	0-04	0	0-00	5	0-06
Dublin	2019	Division 1B	3	0-03	4	0-06	1	0-03	8	0-12
Dublin	2020	Division 1B	2	0-01	1	0-02	1	0-02	4	0-05
Dublin	2021	Division 1B	5	1-06	1	0-01	0	0-00	6	1-07
Career total			21	2-15	10	0-14	5	0-06	36	2-35

== Honours ==
Dublin

- Leinster Under-21 Hurling Championship: 2016
- Leinster Minor Hurling Championship: 2011, 2012
