= 2024 Dublin Senior Hurling Championship =

Annual hurling competition season

- Dates: 13 July - 26 October 2024
- Teams: 10
- Sponsor: Go-Ahead Ireland
- Champions: Na Fianna (2nd title); Dónal Burke (captain); Niall Ó Ceallacháin (manager)
- Runners-up: Kilmacud Crokes; Kieran Dowling (manager); Donal McGovern (manager)

Tournament statistics
- Matches played: 25
- Goals scored: 58 (2.32 per match)
- Points scored: 949 (37.96 per match)

The 2024 Dublin Senior Hurling Championship was the 137th staging of the Dublin Senior Hurling Championship since its establishment by the Dublin County Board in 1887. The draw for the group stage pairings took place in April 2024. The championship ran from 13 July to 26 October 2024.

Na Fianna were the defending champions.

The final was played on 26 October 2024 at Parnell Park in Donnycarney, between Na Fianna and Kilmacud Crokes in what was their third meeting in the final overall and a first final meeting in two years. Na Fianna won the match by 3-16 to 2-18 to claim their second championship title overall.

== Team changes ==
=== To Championship ===
Promoted from the Dublin Senior 2 Hurling Championship

- Craobh Chiaráin
- St Jude's

=== From Championship ===
Relegated to the Dublin Senior 2 Hurling Championship

- Faughs
- St Oliver Plunketts/Eoghan Ruadh

== Group 1 ==
=== Group 1 table ===
Semi-finals Quarter-finals

Team	Matches				Score			Pts
Team	Pld	W	D	L	For	Against	Diff	Pts
Kilmacud Crokes	4	2	2	0	109	77	32	6
Lucan Sarsfields	4	2	2	0	92	89	3	6
Na Fianna	4	2	1	1	122	89	33	5
Cuala	4	1	1	2	93	89	4	3
St Brigid's	4	0	0	4	61	133	-72	0

== Group 2 ==
=== Group 2 table ===
Semi-finals Quarter-finals

Team	Matches				Score			Pts
Team	Pld	W	D	L	For	Against	Diff	Pts
St Vincent's	4	3	1	0	78	67	11	7
Ballyboden St Enda's	4	3	0	1	104	72	32	6
Whitehall Colmcille	4	2	1	1	88	87	1	5
Craobh Chiaráin	4	0	1	3	81	95	-14	1
St Jude's	4	0	1	3	62	92	-30	1

== Knockout stage ==
=== Relegation playoffs ===
28 September 2024 Playoff	Cuala	2-23 - 0-17	St Jude's	Shanganagh Park

28 September 2024 Playoff	Craobh Chiaráin	1-14 - 0-27	St Brigid's	Clonshaugh Grounds

=== Quarter-finals ===
29 September 2024 Quarter-final	Lucan Sarsfields	0-25 - 2-13	Whitehall Colmcille	Parnell Park
	B Coffey 0-9 (4f, 1 ’65, 1 sideline); C Dowling 0-7 (1f); P Crummey, C Walsh 0-2 each; C Stritch, C Crummey, M McCaffrey, S Harkness, J Behan 0-1 apiece.	Report	P Spellacy 1-5 (1-5f); J Raftery 1-1; C Costello 0-3; E Moran, A McDermott, Eoghan O’Donnell, C Sheedy 0-1 apiece.

29 September 2024 Quarter-final	Ballyboden St Enda's	2-14 - 4-26	Na Fianna	Parnell Park
	D Gleeson 1-4; K Desmond 1-1; J Lambert 0-3; P Ryan (1f, 1 ‘65’), N Ryan 0-2 each; S Lambert (f), T Hammersley 0-1 apiece.	Report	C Currie 1-7 (0-6f); C Stacey 1-4; AJ Murphy 1-2; G King (1 sideline), S Currie (2f) 0-4 each; J Tracey 1-0 (pen); B Ryan, J Meagher 0-2 each; W Wheatley 0-1.

=== Semi-finals ===
13 October 2024 Semi-final	St Vincent's	1-21 - 0-26	Na Fianna	Parnell Park
		Report

13 October 2024 Semi-final	Kilmacud Crokes	2-23 - 1-13	Lucan Sarsfields	Parnell Park
		Report

=== Final ===
27 October 2024 Final	Na Fianna	3-16 - 2-18	Kilmacud Crokes	Parnell Park
	C Currie 0-7 (4f, 1 ’65); C McHugh, C Stacey, D Burke (pen) 1-0 each; P O’Dea, B Ryan, J Meagher 0-2 each; S Currie, AJ Murphy, G King (sideline) 0-1 apiece.	Report	O O’Rorke 1-7 (0-4f); C Ó Riain 0-4; David Purcell 1-0; B Hayes, Dara Purcell, R Hayes 0-2 each; F Whitely 0-1.	Referee: S Stack (Parnells)
