= Dublin AFL Division 1 =

Dublin Adult Football League Division 1
- Title holders: Na Fianna

The Dublin Adult Football League Division 1 is the top Gaelic football league in County Dublin. The 2013 champions were St. Brigids who beat St. Sylvesters in the final in Balgriffin.

== Roll of honour ==
Year	Winner	Finalist
2025	Ballyboden St Enda's	Na Fianna
2024	Na Fianna	Ballinteer St. John's
2023		
2022		
2021	Na Fianna 2-16	Kilmacud Crokes 2-12
2020		
2019	Ballymun Kickhams	Ballyboden St Enda's
2018	St Vincents 0-18	Ballyboden St Endas 3-04
2017	Kilmacud Crokes 2-14	St. Maur's 0-12
2016	Ballyboden St Endas 2-18	St. Jude's 3-14
2015	St Vincents 2-10	Kilmacud Crokes 0-12
2014	Na Fianna 0-11	St. Maur's 0-07
2013	St Brigids 2-10	St. Sylvester's 0-12
2012	Na Fianna 1-11	St. Sylvester's 1-10
2011	St. Jude's 1-13	Na Fianna 0-10
2010	St. Sylvester's 0-10	St. Jude's 1-04
2009	Ballymun Kickhams 1-11	St Oliver Plunketts Eoghan Ruadh 0-09
2008	Kilmacud Crokes 2-06	Thomas Davis 0-08
2007	St Oliver Plunketts Eoghan Ruadh 2-13	St Vincents 1-07
2006	Thomas Davis 0-10	Round Towers, Clondalkin 0-07
2005	St Brigids	Thomas Davis
2004	St Marys, Saggart	Lucan Sarsfields
2003	Ballyboden St Endas	Thomas Davis
2002	Kilmacud Crokes	
2001	Thomas Davis	Lucan Sarsfields
2000	Naomh Ólaf	
1999	St Brigids	
1998	Kilmacud Crokes	
1997	Kilmacud Crokes	
1996	Naomh Ólaf	
1995	Ballyboden St Endas	
1994	Kilmacud Crokes	
1993	Whitehall Colmcille	
1992	St Marys, Saggart	
1991		
1990		
1989	St Anne's	
1988	Ballymun Kickhams	
1987	Ballymun Kickhams	
1986		
1985		
1984	Ballymun Kickhams	
1983	Ballymun Kickhams	
1982		Scoil Ui Chonaill
1981		
1980		
1979	Na Fianna	
1978		
1977		
1976		
1975		
1974		
1973		
1972		
1971		
1970	O'Dwyer's	
1969		
1968		
1967	St Marys, Saggart	
1966		
1965		
1964		
1963		
1962		
1961		
1960		
1959		
1958		
1957		
1956		
1955		
1954		
1953		
1952		
1951		
1950		
1949		
1948		
1947		
1946	St Marys, Saggart	
1945		
1944	St Marys, Saggart	
1943	St Marys, Saggart	
1942	St Marys, Saggart	
1941		
1940		
1939	St Marys, Saggart	
1938		
1937	St Marys, Saggart	
1936	St Marys, Saggart	
1935	St Marys, Saggart	
1934		
1933		
1932	Garda	St. Joseph's
1931	Fingallians	
1930	Geraldines	
1929	O'Tooles	
1928	Parnells	
1927	Balbriggan O'Dwyer's	
