= Jimmy Gray (GAA) =

Irish hurler and Gaelic footballer (1929–2023)

Personal information
- Native name: Séamus de Grae (Irish)
- Born: 14 November 1929 Drumcondra, Dublin, Ireland
- Died: 28 March 2023 (aged 93) Blanchardstown; Dublin, Ireland
- Occupation: Sugar Company executive
- Height: 5 ft 8 in (173 cm)

Sport
- Football Position: Centre-forward
- Hurling Position: Goalkeeper
Clubs
- Years: Club
- C. J. Kickhams; Na Fianna
Club titles
	Football	Hurling
Dublin titles	0	0
Inter-county
- Years: County
- 1954–1967: Dublin
Inter-county titles
	Football	Hurling
Leinster Titles	1	1
All-Ireland Titles	0	0
League titles	0	0

James J. Gray (14 November 1929 – 28 March 2023) was an Irish sportsman. He played hurling and Gaelic football with the C. J. Kickhams GAA club until 1955 when he became a founding member of his local club Na Fianna. He was also a member of the Dublin senior inter-county teams in both codes throughout the 1950s and 1960s. He was the goalkeeper on the Dublin senior hurling team that lost to Tipperary in the 1961 All-Ireland Senior Hurling Championship. This was Dublin's last appearance in an All-Ireland Senior Hurling Final.

Gray subsequently served as a referee and as a GAA administrator. He held the position of chairman of the Dublin County Board from 1970 to 1981. As chairman of the Dublin County Board, he was instrumental in the appointment of Kevin Heffernan as manager of the Dublin senior football team in 1973. Gray also served as chairman of the Leinster Council of the GAA from 1990 to 1993. He took charge of the Dublin senior hurling team from 1993 until 1996.

Gray was declared the Hall of Fame Winner at The Friends of Dublin Hurling Awards Night on Friday 13 November 2009.

On 7 July 2013, he was accorded the honour of presenting the Bob O'Keefe Cup to John McCaffrey, captain of the Dublin senior hurling team that won the Leinster Senior Hurling Championship for the first time since 1961, when Gray was the goalkeeper on the winning Dublin team.

Gray held the honorary position of President of Dublin GAA.

Gray died in Dublin on 28 March 2023, at the age of 93.

Sporting positions
Preceded by Lar Foley	Dublin Senior Hurling Manager; 1993–1996	Succeeded by Michael O'Grady
