= 2024–25 All-Ireland Senior Club Hurling Championship =

All-Ireland Senior Club Hurling Championship 2024–25
Championship Details
- Dates: 3 November 2024 – 19 January 2025
- Teams: 17

All Ireland Champions
- Winners: Na Fianna (1st win)
- Captain: Dónal Burke
- Manager: Niall Ó Ceallacháin

All Ireland Runners-up
- Runners-up: Sarsfields
- Captain: Conor O'Sullivan
- Manager: Johnny Crowley

Provincial Champions
- Munster: Sarsfields
- Leinster: Na Fianna
- Ulster: Slaughtneil
- Connacht: Not Played

Championship Statistics
- Matches Played: 16
- Total Goals: 35 (2.18 per game)
- Total Points: 605 (37.81 per game)
- Top Scorer: Colin Currie (0–40)

The 2024–25 All-Ireland Senior Club Hurling Championship is the 54th staging of the All-Ireland Senior Club Hurling Championship, the Gaelic Athletic Association's premier inter-county club hurling tournament. The competition ran from 3 November 2024 until 19 January 2025.

The defending champion was St Thomas'; however, the club did not qualify for the competition after losing to Cappataggle in the Galway SHC semi-final. Doon and Thomstown made their championship debuts, while Clare's Feakle returned after a long absence.

The final was played at Croke Park in Dublin on 19 January 2025, between Na Fianna of Dublin and Sarsfields of Cork, in what was a first championship meeting between the teams. Na Fianna won the match by 2–23 to 0–20 to claim a first title.

Na Fianna's Colin Currie was the competition's top scorer, finishing with 0–40.

== Team summaries ==
Team	County	Captain(s)	Manager	Most recent success		
Team	County	Captain(s)	Manager	All-Ireland	Provincial	County
Ballygunner	Waterford	Pauric Mahony; Conor Sheahan	Darragh O'Sullivan	2022	2023	2023
Castletown–Geoghegan	Westmeath	Aonghus Clarke	Alan Mangan	—	—	2022
Clough–Ballacolla	Laois	Aidan Corby	Willie Hyland	—	—	2022
Doon	Limerick	Darragh O'Donovan	Derek McGrath	—	—	—
Feakle	Clare	Oisín Donnellan	Ger Conway	—	—	1988
Kilcormac–Killoughey	Offaly	Conor Slevin	Shane Hand	—	2012	2023
Loughmore–Castleiney	Tipperary	Liam McGrath	Éamonn Kelly	—	2007	2021
Loughrea	Galway	Ian Hanrahan	Tommy Kelly	—	2006	2006
Na Fianna	Dublin	Dónal Burke	Niall Ó Ceallacháin	—	—	2023
Naas	Kildare	Brian Byrne	Tom Mullally	—	—	2023
Ruairí Óg	Antrim	Neil McManus	Brian Delargy	—	2023	2023
Sarsfields	Cork	Conor O'Sullivan	Johnny Crowley	—	—	2023
Slaughtneil	Derry	Mark McGuigan	Paul McCormack	—	2021	2023
St Martin's	Wexford	Conor Firman	Daithí Hayes	—	—	2019
St Mullin's	Carlow	Ger Coady	Tommy Buggy	—	—	2022
Thomastown	Kilkenny	Jay Burke	Noel Doherty	—	—	1946

== Leinster ==
The draw for the Leinster Club SHC took place in June 2024.

=== Quarter-finals ===
17 November 2024 Quarter-final	Castletown–Geoghegan (Westmeath)	1–25 – 1–14	Thomastown (Kilkenny)	Cusack Park
13:30 IWT (UTC±0)	N O'Brien 1–13 (0-10f), P Clarke, L Varley, D O'Reilly 0–3 each, P Murphy, C Murphy, A Clarke 0–1 each.	Report	R Donnelly 0–8 (all frees), L Connellan 1–1, B Staunton 0–2, E Donnelly, J Donnelly, C Treacy 0–1 each.

17 November 2024 Quarter-final	Naas (Kildare)	0–13 – 1–15	St Martin's (Wexford)	St Conleth's Park
14:00 IWT (UTC±0)	J Sheridan 0–8 (8f), C Boran 0–2, S Leacy 0–1, H Carroll 0–1, F O Sullivan 0–1.	Report	R O'Connor 0–11 (11f), J O Connor 1–0 (1 penalty), D Codd 0–2, J Devereux 0–1, J Coleman 0–1 (1f)

17 November 2024 Quarter-final	St Mullin's (Carlow)	1–12 – 1–17	Kilcormac–Killoughey (Offaly)	Dr Cullen Park
14:30 IWT (UTC±0)	James Doyle 1–4; M Kavanagh 0–3 (2fs); C Kehoe, J Kavanagh, G Coady, M Walsh, P Boland 0–1 each.	Report	A Screeney 0–4 (4f); D Hand 1–0; J Screeney 0–3; C Mahon, C Slevin (2f) 0–2 each; E Grogan, C Mitchell, J Gorman, B Kavanagh, D Kilmartin, C Spain 0–1 each.

17 November 2024 Quarter-final	Na Fianna (Dublin)	3–20 – 1–15	Clough–Ballacolla (Laois)	Parnell Park
15:00 IWT (UTC±0)	C Currie 0–7 (4f, 2 65s); AJ Murphy 1–4; C Stacey 1–1; J Tracey 1–0 (pen); D Burke, J Meagher 0–2 each; P O’Dea, S Currie, B Ryan, D Clerkin 0–1 each.	Report	S Maher 1–9 (7f); C Dunne 0–2; A Corby, R Phelan, S Bergin, K Mulhall 0–1 each.

=== Semi-finals ===
24 November 2024 Semi-final	Castletown–Geoghegan (Westmeath)	1–13 – 2–13	Kilcormac–Killoughey (Offaly)	Cusack Park
13:15 IWT (UTC±0)	N O'Brien 0–6 (0-2f, 0–1 '65), P Clarke 0–3 (0–1 s/cut), A Clarke 1–0, C Murphy 0–2, M Gavigan, S Clavin 0–1 each.	Report	A Screeney 1–8 (0-6f, 0–1 '65), J Gorman 1–0, C Spain (s/cut), C Slevin (f), C Mahon, D Hand, J Screeney 0–1 each.

24 November 2024 Semi-final	Na Fianna (Dublin)	1–16 – 0–15	St Martin's (Wexford)	Parnell Park
15:00 IWT (UTC±0)	C Currie 0–9 (8fs), S Ryan 1–0, G King 0–2 (1 sideline), J Meagher 0–2, C Stacey 0–1, AJ Murphy 0–1, D Burke 0–1.	Report	R O'Connor 0–8 (7fs), D Codd 0–2, D Codd 0–1, J O'Connor 0–1, B Stafford 0–1, J O'Connor 0–1, B O'Connor 0–1.

=== Final ===
30 November 2024 Final	Kilcormac–Killoughey (Offaly)	2–16 – 2–22	Na Fianna (Dublin)	Croke Park
19:40 IWT (UTC±0)	A Screeney 1–8 (0-6f); C Mahon 1–2; C Mitchell 0–3; C Slevin 0–2 (2f); C Spain 0–1.	Report	C Currie 0–8 (7f); D Burke 0–7; AJ Murphy 1–2; S Currie 1–0; J Meagher, B Ryan 0–2 each; C Stacey 0–1.	Attendance: 9,209; Referee: Pádraig Dunne (Laois)

== Munster ==
The draw for the Munster Club SHC took place on 25 July 2024.

=== Quarter-final ===
3 November 2024 Quarter-final	Doon (Limerick)	0–20 – 0–25	Ballygunner (Waterford)	Gaelic Grounds
	A English 0–10 (8fs, 1 65), C Thomas 0–4, P Ryan 0–2, C O'Donovan 0–1, D O'Donovan 0–1, E Stokes 0–1, J Ryan 0–1.	Report	P Mahony 0–11 (9fs), D Hutchinson 0–6, P Fitzgerald 0–4, C Sheahan 0–2, M Mahony 0–2.	Referee: M Kennedy (Tipperary)

=== Semi-finals ===
17 November 2024 Semi-final	Ballygunner (Waterford)	1–26 – 1–16	Loughmore–Castleiney (Tipperary)	Walsh Park
13:15 IWT (UTC±0)	Pauric Mahony (0–9, 4 frees); K Mahony (1–3); P Hogan, D Hutchinson (1 65) (0–4 each); C Power (0–2); S O’Keeffe, C Sheahan, M Mahony, P Fitzgerald (0–1 each).	Report	J McGrath (0–9, 7 frees, 1 65); C McCormack (1–0); C Connolly (0–2); E Meagher, J Ryan, J Meagher, N McGrath (free), L Treacy (0–1 each).	Referee: C O’Regan (Cork)

17 November 2024 Semi-final	Sarsfields (Cork)	1–25 – 1–17	Feakle (Clare)	Páirc Uí Chaoimh
15:15 IWT (UTC±0)	A Myers 1–6, D Hogan 0–6 (0-5f, 0–1 65), Cathal McCarthy, J O’Connor 0–4 each, P Leopold, L Elliott, D Kearney, S O’Regan, Colm McCarthy 0–1 each.	Report	S McGrath 0–7 (0-5f), S Conway, O Donnellan 0–3 each, E Quilligan 1–0 (penalty), E Tuohy 0–2, O O’Connor, E Noonan 0–1 each.	Referee: T Walsh (Waterford)

=== Final ===
1 December 2024 Final	Sarsfields (Cork)	3–20 – 2–19	Ballygunner (Waterford)	Semple Stadium
15:15 IWT (UTC±0)	S O’Regan 2–3, D Hogan 0–5 (0-3f), J O’Connor 1–2, D Kearney 0–4, L Elliott 0–2, C Darcy, Cathal McCarthy, Colm McCarthy, B Murphy 0–1 each.	Report	Pauric Mahony 1–8 (1-7f), P Fitzgeralf 0–5, D Hutchinson 1–2, C Sheahan, P Leavey, K Mahony, C Power 0–1 each.	Attendance: 2,342

== Ulster ==
=== Semi-finals ===
16 November 2024 Semi-final	Slaughtneil (Derry)	1–36 – 3–26 (aet)	Ruairí Óg, Cushendall (Antrim)	Athletic Grounds
19:15 GMT (UTC±0)	B Rogers 0–7, J Cassidy 0–6, C O'Doherty 0–6 (2f), E Cassidy 1–1, M McGuigan 0–3, R Ó Mianáin 0–3, S Cassidy 0–2, Sé McGuigan 0–2, C Coyle 0–2, F McEldowney 0–1, C McAllister 0–1, M McGrath 0–1, G Bradley 0–1	Report	N McManus 3–9 (0-1f, 0–2 65s), F McCambridge 0–3, E Campbell 0–2, F McCurry 0–2, R McAteer 0–2, R McCambridge 0–1, E McQuillan 0–1, S Walsh 0–1, P Burke 0–1, S McAfee 0–1, J McLaughlin 0–1, R McCollam 0–1

=== Final ===
1 December 2024 Final	Portaferry (Down)	1–19 – 2–19	Slaughtneil (Derry)	Athletic Grounds
17:00 GMT (UTC±0)	T McGrattan 0–9 (6f, 2 65), M Conlan 0–3, C Coleman 1–0, F Turpin 0–2, D Sands, N Fitzsimmons 0–2 each and E Sands 0–1.	Report	C O’Doherty 0-7f, J Cassidy, Shane McGuigan, R Ó Mianáin 0–3 each, Sé McGuigan 1–1, Shéa Cassidy 1–0 and B Rogers 0–2	Attendance: 2,274

== Semi-finals ==
15 December 2024 Semi-final	Sarsfields (Cork)	0–18 – 0–17	Slaughtneil (Derry)	St Conleth's Park
13:30 IWT (UTC±0)	A Myers 0–5 (2fs), D Hogan 0–4 (4fs), J O'Connor 0–4, Cathal McCarthy 0–2, B Murphy 0–1, S O'Regan 0–1, L Healy 0–1.	Report	C O'Doherty 0–9 (8fs, 1 65), S McGuigan 0–3, S Cassidy 0–1, E Cassidy 0–1, R O Miainain 0–1, M McGrath 0–1, M McGuigan 0–1.

15 December 2024 Semi-final	Loughrea (Galway)	0–16 – 0–17	Na Fianna (Dublin)	Semple Stadium
15:30 IWT (UTC±0)	T Kileen 0–5 (3f), S Morgan 0–3 (3f), Darren Shaughnessy, A Burns 0–2 each, I Hanrahan, C Kileen, J Mooney, J Ryan 0–1 each.	Report	C Currie 0–10 (7f 1 65), AJ Murphy 0–3, S Currie 0–2, C Stacey, B Ryan.

== Final ==
19 January 2025 Final	Sarsfields (Cork)	0–20 – 2–23	Na Fianna (Dublin)	Croke Park
13:30 IWT (UTC±0)	A Myers 0–10 (0–8 f), J O’Connor 0–5, D Kearney 0–3 (0–1 65), D Hogan, B Murphy 0–1 each.	Report	T Brennan 2–1, C Currie 0–6 (0–5 f, 0–1 65), AJ Murphy 0–5, D Burke (0–1 f), B Ryan 0–3 each, C Stacey 0–2, S Currie, J Meagher, P O’Dea 0–1 each.	Attendance: 31,267; Referee: L Gordon (Galway)

== Statistics ==
=== Top scorers ===
Overall

Rank	Player	Club	Tally	Total	Matches	Average
1	Colin Currie	Na Fianna	0–40	40	5	8.00
2	Pauric Mahony	Ballygunner	1–28	31	3	10.33
3	Adam Screeney	Kilcormac–Killoughey	2–20	26	3	8.66
4	Aaron Myers	Sarsfields	1–21	24	4	6.00
5	Cormac O'Doherty	Slaughtneil	0–22	22	3	7.33
5	Niall O'Brien	Castletown–Geoghegan	1–19	22	2	11.00
7	A. J. Murphy	Na Fianna	2–15	21	5	4.20
8	Rory O'Connor	St Martin's	0–19	19	2	9.50
9	Neil McManus	Ruairí Óg	3-09	18	1	18.00
9	Jack O'Connor	Sarsfields	1–15	18	4	4.50

In a single game

Rank	Player	Club	Tally	Total	Opposition
1	Neil McManus	Ruairí Óg	3-09	18	Slaughtneil
2	Niall O'Brien	Castletown–Geoghegan	1–13	16	Thomastown
3	Stephen Maher	Clough–Ballacolla	1-09	12	Na Fianna
4	Adam Screeney	Kilcormac–Killoughey	1-08	11	Na Fianna
4	Adam Screeney	Kilcormac–Killoughey	1-08	11	Castletown–Geoghegan
4	Pauric Mahony	Ballygunner	1-08	11	Sarsfields
4	Pauric Mahony	Ballygunner	0–11	11	Doon
4	Rory O'Connor	St Martin's	0–11	11	Naas
9	Adam English	Doon	0–10	10	Ballygunner
9	Colin Currie	Na Fianna	0–10	10	Loughrea
9	Aaron Myers	Sarsfields	0–10	10	Na Fianna

=== Miscellaneous ===
- Slaughtneil recorded a first ever Ulster Club SHC defeat of Ruairí Óg, Cushendall.
- There were two first-time provincial final winners, with Na Fianna winning the Leinster Club SHC and Sarsfields winning the Munster Club SHC.

== Awards ==
Team of the Year

== See also ==
- 2024–25 All-Ireland Senior Club Football Championship
