= Niall Ó Ceallacháin =

Irish hurling manager and former player

Personal information
- Born: 1983 (age 42–43) Glasnevin, Dublin, Ireland
- Occupation: Housing body CEO

Sport
- Sport: Hurling
- Position: Midfield
Club
- Years: Club
- Na Fianna
Club titles
- Dublin titles: 0

Niall Ó Ceallacháin
Sport
Club management
- Years: Club
- Na Fianna
Inter-county management
- Years: Team
- 2024–: Dublin
Inter-county titles as manager
County	League	Province	All-Ireland
Dublin	0	0	0

Niall Ó Ceallacháin (born 1983) is an Irish hurling manager and former player. He has been manager of the Dublin senior team since 2024. He played for club side Na Fianna.

== Playing career ==
Born and raised in Glasnevin, as a teenager Ó Ceallacháin played hurling with the amalgamated Dublin Colleges team. He won a Leinster Colleges SHC medal in 2001 after a 1–9 to 1–6 defeat of Good Counsel College in the final. Ó Ceallacháin's performances in this competition resulted in his inclusion on Dublin's minor team in 2001. His club career with Na Fianna began at minor and under-21 levels, before progressing to the senior team.

== Coaching career ==
Ó Ceallacháin coached at all levels with the Na Fianna club before taking over as senior team manager. He guided the club to their first ever Dublin SHC title after a defeat of Ballyboden St Enda's in 2023, before retaining the title the following year. Ó Ceallacháin later guided the club to a first Leinster Club SHC title, before beating Sarsfields by 2–23 to 0–20 in the 2025 All-Ireland Club SHC final.

Ó Ceallachaáin was ratified as manager of the Dublin senior hurling team on 10 September 2024.

== Honours ==
=== Player ===
Dublin Colleges

- Leinster Colleges Senior Hurling Championship: 2001

=== Management ===
Na Fianna

- All-Ireland Senior Club Hurling Championship: 2025
- Leinster Senior Club Hurling Championship: 2024
- Dublin Senior Hurling Championship: 2023, 2024
