= 2023 Dublin Senior Hurling Championship =

Annual hurling competition season

- Dates: 12 July - 29 October 2023
- Teams: 10
- Sponsor: Go-Ahead
- Champions: Na Fianna (1st title); Donal Burke (captain); Seán Baxter (captain); Tom Gleeson (captain); Niall Ó Ceallacháin (manager)
- Runners-up: Ballyboden St Enda's; Niall McMorrow (captain); Luke Corcoran (captain); David Curtin (manager)
- Relegated: Faughs; St Oliver Plunketts/ER

Tournament statistics
- Matches played: 27
- Goals scored: 81 (3 per match)
- Points scored: 996 (36.89 per match)

The 2023 Dublin Senior Hurling Championship was the 136th staging of the Dublin Senior Hurling Championship since its establishment by the Dublin County Board in 1887. The championship ran from 12 July to 29 October 2023.

Kilmacud Crokes entered the championship as the defending champions, however, they were beaten by Na Fianna in the quarter-finals. Faughs and St Oliver Plunketts/Eoghan Ruadh were relegated after losing their respective playoffs.

The final was played on 29 October 2023 at Parnell Park in Donnycarney, between Na Fianna and Ballyboden St Enda's in what was their first ever meeting in the final. Na Fianna won the match by 2-19 to 0-09 to claim their first ever championship title.

== Team summaries ==
Team	Ground	Colours	Manager(s)	Captain(s)
Ballyboden St Enda's	Páirc Uí Mhurchú	Blue and white	David Curtin	Niall McMorrow; Luke Corcoran
Cuala	Shanganagh Park	Blue and white	John McCarthy	Colm Cronin
Faughs	Shanganagh Park	Green and yellow	Johnny Greville	Jack McVeigh; David Croke
Kilmacud Crokes	Glenalbyn	Purple and yellow	Kieran Dowling; Donal McGovern	Fergal Whitely
Lucan Sarsfields	Newcastle Road	White and green	Charlie Carter	Paul Rigney
Na Fianna	St Mobhi Road	Yellow and blue	Niall Ó Ceallacháin	Donal Burke; Seán Baxter
St Oliver Plunketts/Eoghan Ruadh	Martin Savage Park	Maroon and gold	Derek Brennan	Brian McDonnell
St Brigid's	Russell Park	Red and white	Brian Smyth	Kieran Kellett
St Vincent's	Pairc Naomh Uinsionn	Blue and white	Pat Gilroy	John Hetherton
Whitehall Colmcille	Collins Avenue	White and red	Shane Stapleton	

== Group 1 ==
=== Group 1 table ===
Semi-finals Quarter-finals

Team	Matches				Score			Pts
Team	Pld	W	D	L	For	Against	Diff	Pts
Lucan Sarsfields	4	4	0	0	101	89	21	8
Kilmacud Crokes	4	3	0	1	122	72	50	6
Cuala	4	2	0	2	87	92	-5	4
Whitehall Colmcille	4	0	1	3	86	107	-21	1
St Brigid's	4	0	1	3	86	122	-36	1

== Group 2 ==
=== Group 2 table ===
Quarter-finals

Team	Matches				Score			Pts
Team	Pld	W	D	L	For	Against	Diff	Pts
St Vincent's	4	3	0	1	99	75	24	6
Ballyboden St Enda's	4	3	0	1	111	80	31	6
Na Fianna	4	3	0	1	106	62	44	6
St Oliver Plunketts/ER	4	1	0	3	73	97	-24	2
Faughs	4	0	0	4	63	138	-75	0

== Knockout stage ==
=== Relegation playoffs ===
1 October 2023 Playoff	Whitehall Colmcille	1-19 - 0-17	Faughs	O'Toole Park

1 October 2023 Playoff	St Oliver Plunketts/ER	1-20 - 2-18	St Brigid's	O'Toole Park

=== Quarter-finals ===
1 October 2023 Quarter-final	Na Fianna	4-15 - 1-22	Kilmacud Crokes	Parnell Park
	AJ Murphy 3-3, C Currie 0-7 (3f, 1 ‘65’), S Barrett 1-0, B Ryan, S Currie 0-2 each, S Baxter 0-1.	Report	R Hayes 1-3, O O’Rorke 0-5 (4f), D Purcell 0-4, F Whitely 0-3, C Ó Riain, C Conway, B Hayes 0-2 apiece, E Gibbons (f) 0-1.

1 October 2023 Quarter-final	Ballyboden St Enda's	2-25 - 1-21	Cuala	Parnell Park
	P Ryan 1-11 (0-8f, 0-1 sideline), P Christie 1-0, S Durkin, L McDwyer, K Desmond, N McMorrow, E Behan 0-2 apiece, J Lambert, A Mellett, C Dooley, T Hammersley 0-1 each.	Report	L Murphy 0-9 (7f), C Cronin 1-2, J Conroy 0-3, C O’Callaghan 0-2, J Malone, S Brennan (‘65’), S Moran (f), A Power, D Ó Floinn 0-1 each.

=== Semi-finals ===
15 October 2023 Semi-final	Ballyboden St Enda's	0-24 - 1-19	St Vincent's	Parnell Park
		Report

15 October 2023 Semi-final	Lucan Sarsfields	0-14 - 0-18	Na Fianna	Parnell Park
		Report

=== Final ===
29 October 2023 Final	Na Fianna	2-19 - 0-09	Ballyboden St Enda's	Parnell Park
	S Currie (2-5); C Currie (0-10, 7 frees, 1 65); AJ Murphy, S Baxter, G King, C Stacey (0-1).	Report	P Ryan (0-4, 4 frees); K Desmond, L McDwyer, A Mellett, N Ryan, J Lambert (0-1).	Referee: C Mooney (St Pat's)
