= Naomh Ólaf CLG =

Naomh Olaf
- Founded: 1981
- County: Dublin
- Nickname: Olafs
- Colours: Claret and Blue
- Grounds: Páirc Uí Bhriain
- Coordinates: 53°16′51″N 6°13′24″W

Playing kits
Standard colours

Naomh Olaf is a Gaelic Athletic Association club which was founded in 1981 to provide facilities for encouraging the sporting abilities of the people of the developing parish of Balally in south County Dublin, Ireland. A club house was built and players were recruited from around the area, most of them coming from the local schools of St Olaf's, Gaelscoil Thaobh na Coille, St Benildus College, and St Tiernan's. In recent years more and more players are coming from the Leopardstown and Stepaside areas.

== Location ==
The club is located on the Sandyford Industrial Estate in Dublin and recruits players from all around the Sandyford and Balally area. In 1999 Dundrum-Churchtown joined forces with Naomh Olaf to serves both Dundrum and Churchtown areas. The club now has 9 schools in their area stretching from Churchtown right up to Stepaside.

== History ==
In football, the club won promotion back to Division 2 in 2016, winning the promotion playoff after just missing out on automatic promotion. The club won the Dublin Intermediate Championship in 2013 and went on to represent Dublin before losing in the Leinster Intermediate Club Football Championship final replay. The Junior team won Division 9 in 2016 and now football teams compete in AFL2, AFL5 and AFL9.

In hurling, the club's two adult hurling teams play in AHL3 and AHL6 and the first team contests the Intermediate hurling championship.

After a long absence, the club fielded an adult ladies team again in 2012. The ladies Gaelic football team won a championship in 2012, a cup and league double in 2013, and cup honours in 2014 and 2015. As of 2020, the team was due to compete in Div 4.

In 2015, the club fielded an adult camogie team for the first time ever, and finished the season with a championship win.

== Facilities ==
As well as its sporting facilities, the club owns and operates a bar, a function room, and a large hall for training and other events. The club has three senior pitches and a floodlit all-weather hurling wall. There is also a club shop.

== Roll of honour ==
- Dublin Intermediate Football Championship: Winners 1993, 2013, 2026
- Ladies Junior C Football Championship: Winners 2020
- Dublin Junior Football Championship: Winners 1990
- Dublin Junior B Football Championship: Winners 2002
- Dublin Junior All County 2 Championship: Winners 2020
- Dublin Junior D Football Championship: Winners 2016
- Dublin Senior Football League Division 1 Winners 2000
- Dublin Senior Football League Division 2 Winners 2017
- Dublin AFL Division 6 Playoff Winners 2019
- Dublin AFL Division 7 Winners 2018
- Dublin AFL Division 8 Winner 2017
- Dublin AFL Division 9 Winner 2016
- Dublin AFL Division 10 Winners 2019
- Dublin AFL Division 11S Winner 2017

== Players ==
- David Byrne, Captain of the Dublin Minor football All-Ireland winning team 2012, Dublin U21 Leinster Winning Captain 2015, Dublin All Ireland Winner 2015, 2016, 2017, 2018, 2019, 2020, & 2023, National League Winner 2016
- Declan O'Dwyer, Former Dublin Senior Hurler, Leinster Championship Winner
- Luke Fitzgerald, former Irish and Leinster rugby union player
