= Dónal Burke =

Irish hurler

Personal information
- Native name: Dónal de Búrca (Irish)
- Born: 1998 (age 27–28) Glasnevin, Dublin, Ireland
- Occupation: Accountant

Sport
- Sport: Hurling
- Position: Right corner-forward
Club
- Years: Club
- 2016–present: Na Fianna
Club titles
- Dublin titles: 3
- Leinster titles: 1
- All-Ireland Titles: 1
College
- Years: College
- Dublin City University
College titles
- Fitzgibbon titles: 0
Inter-county*
Years	County	Apps (scores)
2017–present	Dublin	32 (5-270)
Inter-county titles
- Leinster titles: 0
- All-Irelands: 0
- NHL: 0
- All Stars: 0
- *Inter County team apps and scores correct as of match played 21 June 2025.

Dónal Burke (born 1998) is an Irish hurler. At club level he plays with Na Fianna and at inter-county level with the Dublin senior hurling team. Burke is Dublin's all-time top championship scorer.

== Career ==
Burke first played hurling to a high standard as a student at St Declan's College in the Dublin Schools' SAHC. His performances for the school resulted in his inclusion on the amalgamated Dublin North team in the Leinster Colleges SAHC. Burke later played for DCU Dóchas Éireann and was a Fitzgibbon Cup runner-up in 2018 before being named on the Rising Stars Team of the Year.

Burke had a very successful underage career at club level with Na Fianna. After winning three successive Dublin MAHC titles from 2014 to 2016 he went on to win back-to-back Dublin U21AHC titles in 2017 and 2018. Burke progressed to the club's senior team and was captain when Na Fianna won the Dublin SHC title in 2023, however, he missed the game due to injury.

Burke first appeared at inter-county level for Dublin during a two-year tenure with the minor team. He won a Leinster MHC after a defeat of Wexford in 2016. He later spent two unsuccessful seasons with the under-21 team. Burke was drafted into the senior team in 2017.

== Career statistics ==
As of 25 May 2025

Team	Year	National League			Leinster		All-Ireland		Total	
Team	Year	Division	Apps	Score	Apps	Score	Apps	Score	Apps	Score
Dublin	2017	Division 1A	6	2-32	1	0-03	2	0-02	9	2-37
Dublin	2018	Division 1B	6	0-34	—		—		6	0-34
Dublin	2019	Division 1B	5	1-11	—		—		5	1-11
Dublin	2020	Division 1B	4	0-13	2	1-28	1	0-12	7	1-53
Dublin	2021	Division 1B	5	1-55	3	0-27	1	0-13	9	1-95
Dublin	2022	Division 1B	2	1-21	5	0-59	—		7	1-80
Dublin	2023	Division 1B	5	1-55	5	2-51	2	0-08	12	3-114
Dublin	2024	Division 1B	3	1-17	6	2-60	1	0-03	10	3-80
Dublin	2025	Division 1B			2	0-04	1	0-00	3	0-04
Total			36	7-238	24	5-232	8	0-38	68	12-508

== Honours ==
Na Fianna

- Dublin Senior Hurling Championship: 2023 (c) 2024 (c) 2025 (c)
- Leinster Senior Hurling Championship : 2024 (c)
- All Ireland Senior Hurling Championship: 2025 (c)
- Dublin Under-21 A Hurling Championship: 2017, 2018
- Dublin Minor A Hurling Championship: 2014, 2015, 2016

Dublin

- Walsh Cup: 2022
- Leinster Minor Hurling Championship: 2016
