= Craobh Chiaráin CLG =

Sports club in County Dublin, Ireland

Craobh Chiaráin
- Craobh Chiaráin
- Founded: 1962
- County: Dublin
- Nickname: The Craobh
- Colours: Maroon and Yellow
- Grounds: Clonshaugh
- Coordinates: 53°22′24.62″N 6°12′58.10″W

Playing kits
Standard colours

Senior Club Championships
	All Ireland	Leinster champions	Dublin champions
Hurling:	0	0	5

Craobh Chiaráin is a Gaelic Athletic Association club in Donnycarney, County Dublin, Ireland. Craobh have won the Dublin Senior Hurling Championship on five occasions, in 1971, 1998, 2001, 2003, 2006. The club was founded in 1962 when two existing clubs, Craobh Rua and Naomh Chiaráin, were amalgamated.

== History ==
In 2006, Craobh beat Ballyboden St Endas in the Dublin senior hurling final at Parnell Park by a scoreline of 2–10 to 2-08. The club later went on to qualify for the Leinster championship against Carlow champions Mount Leinster in the preliminary round of the competition.

== Achievements ==
- Dublin Senior Hurling Championship Winners (5) 1971, 1998, 2001, 2003, 2006
- Dublin Senior Hurling League Winners (9) 1972, 1974, 1991, 1994, 1997, 1998, 2001, 2002, 2010
- Dublin Intermediate Hurling Championship: Winners (2) 1965, 1992
- Dublin Junior Hurling Championship: Winners 1964
- Dublin Junior C Hurling Championship Winners 2007
- Dublin Junior D Hurling Championship Winners 2006
- Dublin Under 21 Hurling Championship Winner 1982, 1984, 1992, 1995
- Dublin Under 21 C Hurling Championship Winner 2018
- Dublin Minor Hurling Championship Winners 1989
- Dublin AFL Division 9 Winner 2006

== Notable players ==
- Alan McCrabbe
- Derek O'Reilly
