= O'Toole Park =

Sports venue in Dublin, Ireland

- Páirc Uí Thuathail
- Interactive map of O'Toole Park
- Location: Crumlin, Dublin, Ireland
- Coordinates: 53.3155°N 6.3072°W
- Owner: Dublin GAA
- Public transit: Kimmage Road West bus stop (Dublin Bus 9, 17); Stannaway Court bus stop (Dublin Bus 83)

Construction
- Opened: 1957; 69 years ago

O'Toole Park (Irish: Páirc Uí Thuathail), also known as Lorcan O'Toole Park (Irish: Páirc Lorcáin Uí Thuathail), is a Gaelic games venue in Crumlin, Dublin. The ground was opened in 1957 by then Minister for Defence Kevin Boland. It is named after Lorcan O'Toole, who was secretary of the Dublin County Board from 1915 to 1940.

Owned by Dublin GAA, it is used for games during the Dublin Senior Football and Dublin Senior Hurling Championships. It also hosts Dublin Intermediate and Junior county finals. It was home to the Dublin county football and county hurling teams prior to the redevelopment of Parnell Park.
