= St Jude's GAA =

Sports club in County Dublin, Ireland

St Jude's
- CLG Naomh Jude
- Founded: 1978
- County: Dublin
- Nickname: Judes
- Colours: Navy and Sky Blue
- Grounds: Tymon Park
- Coordinates: 53°17′49.52″N 6°19′44.30″W

Playing kits
Standard colours

Senior Club Championships
	All Ireland	Leinster champions	Dublin champions
Camogie:	-	-	3

St Jude's (Irish: Naomh Jude) is a Gaelic Athletic Association club based in Templeogue on the southside of Dublin. The club fields teams in Gaelic football, hurling, camogie and Ladies football. Teams are fielded from Senior Grade down to under eight level. The club also runs an academy which caters for children from four years of age to seven years of age.

== History ==
Bishop Galvin National School was formed in 1975. Internal leagues were introduced in the school and, by 1977, football was introduced into the Summer Project.

It was in this period that St Judes G.A.A. Club was formed. The formation took place at a meeting held in the school on 18 July 1978, when a committee was appointed to look after the affairs of the new Cumann Peil Naomh Jude. Within a number of weeks, two teams were entered in the South East Leagues at Under 10 and Under 14 levels.

In those days, St Judes played games wherever a pitch was available. Most of the home ties were played at Bushy Park and then later in Bancroft Park in Tallaght.

The first honours to come to the new club was at Under 11A level in 1980 when the club won the South East League. It was at this stage that St Judes Club found a new permanent home in Tymon Park.

In February 1982, a new hurling and camogie section was inaugurated and the name was officially changed to Cumann Luthcleas Gael Naomh Jude.

As of 2020, St Jude's football team were managed by Gareth Roche.

== Honours ==
- Dublin Senior Football League Division 1 (1): 2011
- Dublin Senior Hurling League (1): 2014
- Dublin Senior B Hurling Championship (1): 2007
- Dublin Intermediate Hurling Championship (1): 2016
- Dublin Junior Hurling Championship (3): 1989, 1996, 2014
- Dublin Junior B Hurling Championship (1): 2002
- Dublin Junior C Hurling Championship (2): 1998, 2004
- Dublin Junior D Hurling Championship (1): 2016
- Dublin Minor C Hurling Championship (1): 2007
- Dublin Junior D Football Championship (1): 2003
- Dublin Senior Camogie Championship (3): 2018, 2020, 2021

== Notable players ==
- Pat Spillane
- Danny Sutcliffe
- Kevin McManamon

== See also ==
- Aodán Mac Suibhne
