= CLG Na Fianna =

Sports club in County Dublin, Ireland

Na Fianna GAA Club
- CLG Na Fianna
- Founded: 1955
- County: Dublin
- Colours: Yellow and Blue
- Grounds: Mobhi Road, St Vincents School, Johnstown Park, Collinstown Lane
- Coordinates: 53°22′29″N 6°15′51″W

Playing kits
Standard colours

Senior Club Championships
	All Ireland	Leinster champions	Dublin champions
Football:	-	1	5
Hurling:	1	1	3
Ladies' football:	–	1	3

CLG Na Fianna (Irish: Cumann Lúthchleas Gael Na Fianna) is a Gaelic Athletic Association club based in Glasnevin, in the Northside of Dublin, Ireland. It operates as a sporting and social club to the neighbouring residential areas and is involved in the promotion of Gaelic games — Gaelic football, hurling, camogie, handball and rounders—and the traditional Irish pursuits of music and dance.

== History ==
Na Fianna was officially formed as a club on 25 April 1955, when 201 members transferred from C.J. Kickham GAA Club to form Cumann Luthchleas Gael Na Fianna. The club's first annual general meeting took place on 27 October 1955. Na Fianna's first clubhouse was originally transported from the Guinness Sports Grounds in Crumlin to Mobhi Road but was burnt to the ground in May 1967. The members built a new clubhouse five years after the fire. Aras Na Fianna was the first GAA clubhouse in the country to include a members' bar and cater for all GAA sports including a handball alley. It served its members for almost 20 years before a further extension was built. Further extensions and a major refurbishment was again undertaken, in 2005, to accommodate an increase in membership in the intervening period.

Na Fianna is a member of the Dublin GAA bodies in all the Gaelic codes of Gaelic football, hurling, camogie, ladies' football and handball. It is affiliated to the national organisation, the Gaelic Athletic Association. Being in the parish of Glasnevin, it connects to the many family residents in the Mobhi Road/ Homefarm Road/ Ballymun Road/ Botanic Road axis, extending to the edges of Phibsboro, North Circular Road, Glasnevin Avenue, Drumcondra Road and Griffith Avenue, thus taking in all the Iona and Drumcondra residents also. The club also has affiliations with several local primary and post-primary schools.

In terms of Irish culture, the Na Fianna Céilí is a longstanding tradition at the club, and the club has also participated in GAA Scór events. Céilí music and dancing is a regular feature in the club hall, while informal music sessions are a feature of the members' bar.

== Football ==
Na Fianna have won the Dublin Senior Football Championship on five occasions, firstly in 1969 and for the second time, exactly ten years later in 1979. They won a championship treble, twenty years later, starting in 1999 and continuing in 2000 and 2001.

After winning the Dublin Senior Football Championship in 1999, they went on to win the Leinster Senior Club Football Championship later that year defeating Sarsfield's, 1–11 to 0–8. They defeated Crossmolina Deel Rovers in the All-Ireland semi-final to qualify for the 2000 All-Ireland Senior Club Football Championship final against Crossmaglen Rangers of Armagh. Na Fianna were defeated in the final by a scoreline of 1–14 to 0–12. The match was played on St. Patricks Day in Croke Park with an attendance of 31,965.

Na Fianna Senior Ladies' team won the County Championship in 2009, the first time the ladies' section have won a championship at senior level. The final score was Na Fianna 1-11 Naomh Mearnog 1–10. The senior ladies' won their second title against Ballyboden St. Enda's in July 2011. The scoreline was 4–12 to 2-08. They went on to defeat Sarsfields from Laois in the Leinster Final on Sunday, 23 October 2011 on a scoreline of 3–03 to 0–10. They progressed to the All-Ireland Final as a result of defeating Donaghmore from County Cork on a scoreline of 2–09 to 0–10. Na Fianna contested the All-Ireland final on 27 November 2011 but unfortunately were defeated by Carnacon from County Mayo on a scoreline of 2–12 to 2–4.

In 2010, Na Fianna's Under 14 football team won the Feile Peile na nOg Division One All-Ireland title for the first time in the club's history.

Na Fianna's Minor (Under 18) Football team have won the Dublin Minor Football "A" Championship nine times in 1960, 1965, 1974, 1975, 2008, 2009, 2014, 2017 and 2025.

In 2013, Na Fianna completed a three-in-a-row of Dublin Under 21 Football "A" Football Championship titles, defeating Ballyboden St. Enda's on a scoreline of 1–8 to 1–6. The second Under 21 team won the "C" Championship final, defeating Clan na Gael Fontenoy, 3–9 to 0–3.

== Hurling ==
In 2017, the Na Fianna Minor Hurling team completed a four-in-a-row of Dublin Minor A Hurling Championship titles and their seventh title in total.

Na Fianna reached the first Dublin Senior Hurling Championship final in their history in 2021, losing to Kilmacud Crokes after extra time on a score line of 4–26 to 2-25. They returned to the final in 2022, again losing to Kilmacud Crokes on a score line of 0–20 to 0-17

The club finally won their first ever Dublin Senior Hurling Championship in 2023 when they defeated Ballyboden St. Enda's in the final on a score line of 2–19 to 0-09 and went on to contest the Leinster Senior Club Hurling Championship final losing to Kilkenny champions, O'Loughlin Gaels by a single point.

The 2024 season proved to be one of the best ever years for hurling in Na Fianna. The senior hurling team successfully defended their Dublin Senior Hurling Championship title in dramatic fashion, scoring an injury time goal to defeat Kilmacud Crokes in the final by a single point on a score line of 3–16 to 2–18. They then went on to win the Leinster Senior Club Hurling Championship, defeating Offaly champions Kilcormac-Killoughey, 2–22 to 2–16. The season was wrapped up with the ultimate achievement of winning the All-Ireland Senior Club Hurling Championship beating Cork champions Sarsfields, 2–23 to 0-20.

Na Fianna won a third Dublin SHC title in a row, following a "dramatic stoppage time winner" over Lucan Sarsfields, in the 2025 final, 1–20 to 0-22.

== Administration ==
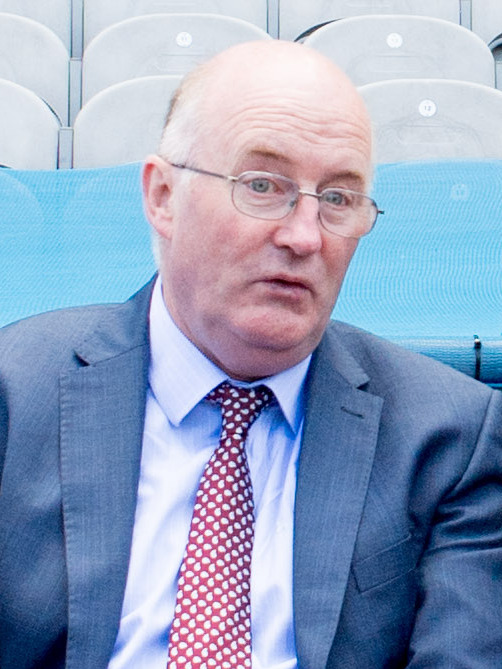
Horan in June 2018

In 2017, club member and former player with Na Fianna, John Horan was elected as the 39th president of the GAA. He held the role until 2021.

== Honours ==
=== Football ===
- All-Ireland Senior Club Football Championship (0): (runners-up - 2000
- Leinster Senior Club Football Championship: (1): 1999-2000 (runners-up in 2000–01, 2001–02)
- Dublin Senior Football Championship (5): 1969, 1979, 1999, 2000, 2001
- Dublin Intermediate Football Championship (2): 2017, 2024
- Dublin Junior Football Championship (2): 1975, 2005
- Dublin Junior B Football Championship (1): 2010
- Dublin Junior D Football Championship (1): 2014
- Dublin Under 21 Football Championship (5): 1977, 2011, 2012, 2013, 2017
- Dublin Under 21 C Football Championship (1): 2013
- Dublin Under 21 D Football Championship (2): 2011, 2016
- Dublin Minor A Football Championship (9): 1960, 1965, 1974, 1975, 2008, 2009, 2014, 2017, 2025
- Dublin Minor D Football Championship (3): 2009, 2011, 2023
- Dublin Senior Football League Division 1 (6): 1979, 2012, 2014, 2021, 2022, 2024
- Dublin AFL Div. 3 (1): 2016
- Dublin AFL Div. 4 (1): 2011

=== Hurling ===
- All-Ireland Senior Club Hurling Championship (1): 2025
- Leinster Senior Club Hurling Championship (1): 2024 (runners-up in 2023)
- Dublin Senior Hurling Championship (3): 2023, 2024, 2025
- Dublin Senior Hurling League Division 1 (1): 2021
- Dublin Junior Hurling Championship (4): 1981, 1986, 1991, 2012
- Dublin Junior D Hurling Championship (1): 2009
- Dublin Junior F Hurling Championship (1): 2017
- Dublin Under 21 Hurling Championship (2): 2017, 2018
- Dublin Under 21 E Hurling Championship (1): 2024
- Dublin Minor A Hurling Championship (7): 1964, 1981, 2012, 2014, 2015, 2016, 2017
- Dublin Minor C Hurling Championship (1): 2013
- Dublin Minor D Hurling Championship (2): 2010, 2014
- Dublin Minor E Hurling Championship (1): 2007

=== Ladies football ===
- Leinster Ladies' Senior Club Football Championship (1): 2011
- Dublin Ladies' Senior Football Championship (3): 2009, 2011, 2014

== World record ==
On 7 May 2012, Na Fianna set a new Guinness world record for the most people to take part in a GAA training session. 1,100 children participated in the event, beating the previous record of 528 set by St Joseph's GAA Club from Glenavy, County Antrim, in May 2010.

== Notable players ==
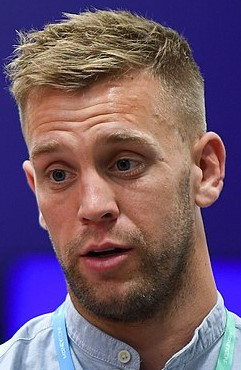
Jonny Cooper in 2018

- Joey Boland, former Dublin inter-county hurling player
- Donal Burke, current Dublin inter-county hurling player
- John Caffrey, former Dublin inter-county football player
- Paul Caffrey, former Dublin inter-county football player and inter-county manager
- Jonny Cooper, former Dublin inter-county football player. Appointed Dublin Under-20 manager in October 2025
- Senan Connell, former Dublin inter-county football player. Later a Today FM and Sky Sports pundit
- Kenny Cunningham, former Republic of Ireland national football team captain
- Colin Currie, current Dublin inter-county hurling player
- Seán Currie, current Dublin inter-county hurling player
- Conor Early, Louth inter-county football player, who transferred in 2023
- A. J. Murphy, current Dublin inter-county hurling player
- Dessie Farrell, former Dublin inter-county football player and inter-county manager
- Jimmy Gray, former dual-player with Dublin. Later Dublin hurling manager
- Kieran McGeeney, former Armagh inter-county footballer and current Armagh manager
- Enda McNulty, former Armagh inter-county football player
- Conor McHugh, Dublin inter-county dual-player
- Eoin Murchan, current Dublin inter-county football player
- Jason Sherlock, former Dublin inter-county football player
- Hannah Tyrrell, Dublin ladies' footballer and Ireland women's rugby international
