= St Oliver Plunketts/Eoghan Ruadh GAA =

Sports club in County Dublin, Ireland

St Oliver Plunkett/Eoghan Ruadh GAA Club
- Founded: 1960
- County: Dublin
- Nickname: Plunketts
- Colours: Maroon and Gold
- Grounds: Martin Savage Park/Glendu Park; Navan Road
- Coordinates: 53°22′30.87″N 6°19′18.60″W

Playing kits
Standard colours

Senior Club Championships
	All Ireland	Leinster champions	Dublin champions
Football:	0	0	0
Camogie:	1	1	5

St Oliver Plunkett/Eoghan Ruadh (Irish: Naomh Oilibhéar Pluincéad, Eoghan Ruadh ) is a Gaelic Athletic Association club situated on the Navan Road on the northside of Dublin, Ireland. St Oliver Plunkett Eoghan Ruadh senior football team currently have no sponsor. Plunketts won the 2006 Dublin AFL Division 2 title and won the 2007 Dublin AFL Division 1 title. Plunketts currently compete in the Dublin Senior Hurling League Division 1 and Dublin Senior B, Division 1 Camogie League.

== Achievements ==
- Dublin Senior Football Championship: Runners-up: (3)
  - 2008, 2011, 2014
- Dublin Senior 2 Football Championship: Winners
  - 2013, 2016
- Dublin Senior Hurling Championship: Winners
  - 1951 (as Eoghan Ruadh)
- Dublin Senior B Hurling Championship: Winners
  - 1999 2015 2026
- Dublin Intermediate Hurling Championship: Winners (3)
  - 1955 (as Eoghan Ruadh), 1978 (as St. Oliver Plunkett's), 1985 (as St. Oliver Plunkett's)
- Dublin Junior Football Championship: Winners (1)
  - 2017
- Dublin Junior Hurling Championship: Winners (6
  - 1929 (as Eoghan Ruadh), 1934 (as Eoghan Ruadh), 1942 (as Eoghan Ruadh), 1946 (as Eoghan Ruadh), 2001 (as St. Oliver Plunkett's) 2022 junior b champions
- Dublin Junior C Football Championship Winner
  - 2009
- Dublin Junior B Hurling Championship Winners
  - 2014 2022
- Dublin Junior C Hurling Championship Winners
  - 2013
- Dublin Junior D Hurling Championship Winners
  - 2011
- Dublin Junior F Hurling Championship Winners
  - 2012
- Dublin AFL Division 1: Winners (1)
  - 2007
- Dublin AFL Division 2: Winners (3)
  - 2006 2021 2026
- Dublin AFL Div. 7 Winners
  - 2014
- Dublin AFL Div. 9 Winners
  - 2017
- Dublin Minor B Football Championship Winners
  - 2016
- Dublin Under 21 Hurling Championship Winner
  - 1975 (as Eoghan Ruadhs), 1988 (as St. Oliver Plunkett's)
- Dublin Under 21 B Hurling Championship Winner
  - 2018 2019 2023
- Dublin Minor A Hurling Championship Winners (14)
  - 1937 (as Eoghan Ruadhs), 1938 (as Eoghan Ruadhs), 1939 (as Eoghan Ruadhs), 1940 (as Eoghan Ruadhs), 1941 (as Eoghan Ruadhs), 1942 (as Eoghan Ruadhs), 1972, (as Eoghan Ruadhs), 1973 (as Eoghan Ruadhs), 1974 (as Eoghan Ruadhs), 1977 (as Eoghan Ruadhs), 1980(as St. Oliver Plunkett's), 1984 (as St. Oliver Plunkett's), 1986 (as St. Oliver Plunkett's), 1987 (as St. Oliver Plunkett's)
- Dublin Minor B Hurling Championship Winners
  - 2013, 2017 2019

Division 5 hurling champions 2023

Division 9b champions ladies football

Junior 1 champions 2025

Minor A2 football champions 2025

Under 21 e hurling champions 2025

minor A2 hurling champions 2026

minor hurling division 2 champions 2026

== Camogie ==
Eoghan Ruadh camogie club were All-Ireland Senior Club Camogie Champions in 1967. The club was founded in 1937 by Muriel Munnelly, Annie Hogan, Elsie Hickey and the O’Briens in Aughrim Street Parish, Dublin. The club was promoted to the senior grade in 1939 and has remained in the top level since. They won their first Dublin senior championship in 1953, another in 1960 and a three-in-a-row from 1967 to 1969. Two presidents of the Camogie Association, Pat Rafferty and Phyllis Breslin, and Dublin chairperson, Anne Ashton, played on the winning 1967 team.

- Alan Brogan,Patrick Shelly former senior inter-county footballers for Dublin
- Bernard Brogan, current senior inter-county footballer for Dublin
- Paul Brogan, former senior inter-county footballer for Dublin
- Mick Galvin, former senior inter-county footballer for Dublin
- Declan Lally, former senior inter-county footballer for Dublin
- Ross McConnell, former senior inter-county footballer for Dublin
- Ciarán McKeever, current senior inter-county footballer for Armagh
- Anthony Moyles, former senior inter-county footballer for meathMeath
- Gareth Smith, former senior inter-county footballer for Cavan
- Seán Bugler, current senior inter-county footballer for Dublin
