= Battle of Omagh =

2006 NFL Gaelic football match

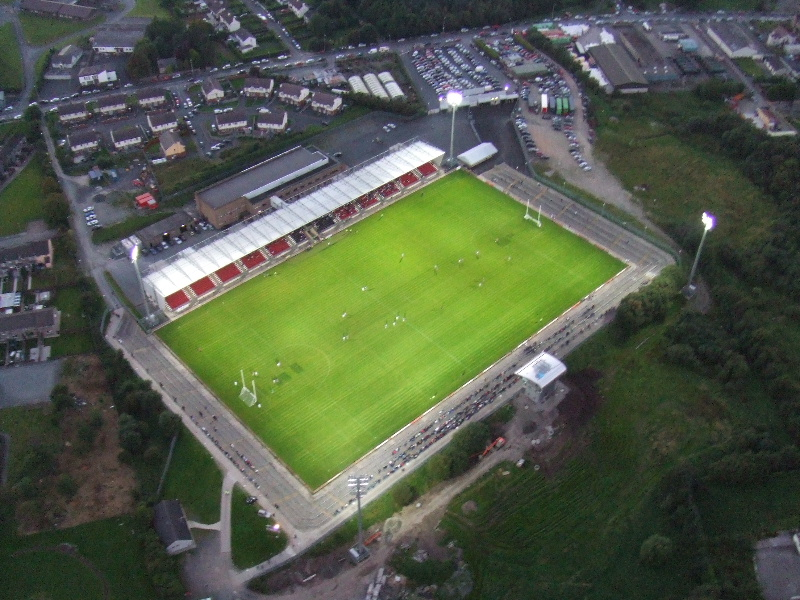
- Event: 2006 National Football League
Tyrone	Dublin
1–6 (9)	1–9 (12)
- Date: 5 February 2006
- Venue: Healy Park, Omagh
- Referee: Paddy Russell (Tipperary)
- Attendance: 12,000

The "Battle of Omagh" was a football match of Ireland's National League, played at Healy Park in Omagh, on Sunday, 5 February 2006 between Dublin and the 2005 All-Ireland SFC champions Tyrone. The final score, of 1–9 to 1–6, was in favour of Dublin.

The highlights of the match included the sendings-off of Dublin's Alan Brogan and Tyrone's Colin Holmes and, subsequently, Dublin's Denis Bastick and Tyrone's Stephen O'Neill after both received second yellow cards. O'Neill had just won the All Stars Footballer of the Year award, presented annually to the footballer who performed outstandingly in that year's All-Ireland Senior Football Championship. Referee Paddy Russell also issued fourteen yellow cards (eight of which were given to Dublin players and six of which were given to Tyrone players), in a game that featured several mass brawls, the first with as many as eighteen players happening in the fourth minute. The Gaelic Athletic Association (GAA) charged players (including Alan Brogan, Bryan Cullen and Ciarán Whelan) for their actions during the game, while others (including Peadar Andrews) received warnings. However, they all appealed and did not have to serve any suspensions. Only Holmes was suspended, because the referee had issued him with a straight red card.

The name "Battle of Omagh" was later applied to the same fixture in 2020.

== Background ==
Dublin and Tyrone were meeting for the first time since the quarter-final of the 2005 All-Ireland SFC, played at Croke Park the previous August. That game had gone to a replay, which Tyrone won by a scoreline of 2–18 to 1–14.

The 2006 National Football League game between Dublin and Tyrone was a Division 1A Round 1 fixture, the opening game of league's top division campaign. The game was broadcast live to a national television audience on TG4.

Tyrone named ten members of the team that had played in the 2005 All-Ireland Senior Football Championship final, with another three players included as substitutes. Five of Tyrone's players from 2005 — Peter Canavan, Mark Harte, Chris Lawn, Colm McCullagh and Leo Meenan — were not involved in the 2006 National League campaign.

== Match ==
=== Summary ===
In the fourth minute of the game the first of several mass brawls occurred and involved as many as eighteen players. Referee Paddy Russell restricted himself to two yellow cards, issued to Dublin player Alan Brogan and to Tyrone player Brian Meenan.

The game's first quarter featured four scores, among them Colin Holmes's point from play for Tyrone. Tyrone's Stephen O'Neill and Dublin's Tomás Quinn scored from frees. O'Neill had just won the All Stars Footballer of the Year award, presented annually to the footballer who performed outstandingly in that year's All-Ireland Senior Football Championship. Owen Mulligan put Tyrone into the lead. Then a foul was committed on young Tyrone debutant Raymond Mulgrew, resulting in Dublin conceding a penalty. O'Neil converted the penalty kick for Tyrone. Then he scored another free, which meant that Tyrone led by a scoreline of 1–5 to 0–5. Quinn scored two further frees as the half closed, his fourth and fifth points of the game. Tyrone, therefore, were ahead by one goal at half-time (on a scoreline of 1–5 to 0–5). However, they would score only a single point in the second half.

The second half featured two brawls. One of the brawls spread off the pitch, and Dublin manager Paul Caffrey beckoned his substitutes down from the stand.

Within nine minutes of the restart, Dublin had drawn level. Tyrone conceded a penalty kick, which Quinn converted. However, a further brawl led to Dublin's Alan Brogan and Tyrone's Colin Holmes being issued with red cards and they both had to leave the field of play.

Within twenty-three minutes of the restart, Tyrone player O'Neill had received a second yellow card, meaning he too had to leave the field of play. Tyrone player Gerard Cavlan sustained an injury, necessitating his departure from the game. It was Bryan Cullen who put Dublin ahead for the first time in the game. Quinn converted two more frees, giving his team a three-point lead. Tyrone made a substitution, sending Peter Donnelly onto the field. Donnelly would score his team's only point of the second half. Dublin player David Henry scored the ultimate point for his team. Quinn's contribution of 1–7 helped Dublin to victory, though he also missed on numerous occasions.

Dublin's Denis Bastick and Tyrone's Stephen O'Neill both received second yellow cards. Bastick was in his second year on the Dublin panel.

Referee Paddy Russell also issued fourteen yellow cards (eight of which were given to Dublin players and six of which were given to Tyrone players). Stewarts had to lead Russell from the field of play after the game had concluded, owing to the vituperation of spectators who were attending the game. The referee called it a "frightening" experience. He thought about abandoning the game, though ultimately he did not. He also thought about ending his career as a referee.

Tyrone manager Mickey Harte said afterwards that divine intervention would not have been enough: "If Paddy Russell had been God Almighty he couldn't have refereed the game today". This quote is often repeated.

=== Details ===
5 February 2006; Round 1	Tyrone	1–6 (9) – (12) 1–9	Dublin	Healy Park, Omagh; Attendance: 12,000; Referee: Paddy Russell (Tipperary)

== Aftermath ==
RTÉ broadcast highlights of the game. The events featured on the front pages of the newspapers, as well as the back pages. GAA president Seán Kelly called upon the Central Disciplinary Committee (CDC) to review the game as "a matter of urgency".

The following day, 6 February, the referee Russell submitted his match report. It had an addendum stating that Dublin player Alan Brogan had been issued with a second yellow card and not a straight red card, as had until then been thought. The report said that "the sideline [official]" reported Holmes as having committed a "striking with the fist", that this was why he had been sent from the field of play and that he had received the only straight red card of the match.

The CDC met on 8 February. The following day, the CDC banned Holmes for four weeks but confirmed it was continuing to examine footage of the game. The referee was contacted and enquiries were made about nine players. On 11 February, the referee responded by sending a letter, while the CDC also met again. One week on from the Battle of Omagh, and a Dublin team featuring Alan Brogan lost unexpectedly to Monaghan in their next NFL game at home in Parnell Park, while Tyrone (minus the suspended Holmes) also lost their next game, against Fermanagh.

On 14 February, the CDC called nine players, five of whom were Dubliners, before it, for the following Saturday, 18 February. The CDC subsequently sanctioned both county boards that oversaw the teams (the Dublin County Board and the Tyrone County Board), fining each a sum of €10,000. The CDC stated the following with regards to the people involved: "Michael Magee (Tyrone) was suspended for eight weeks in accordance with Rule 140; Owen Mulligan (Tyrone) and Kevin Hughes (Tyrone) were suspended for four weeks in accordance with Rule 138 and eight weeks in accordance with Rule 140, to run concurrently. Ryan McMenamin (Tyrone) was cleared of the charge. Dr Seamus Cassidy (Tyrone) was issued with a severe warning as to his future conduct. The Tyrone County Board were fined €10,000 and issued with a severe warning as to the future conduct of their team. Bryan Cullen (Dublin) was suspended for four weeks in accordance with Rule 138. Ciarán Whelan (Dublin), Kevin Bonner (Dublin) and Alan Brogan (Dublin) were all suspended for eight weeks in accordance with Rule 140. Peadar Andrews was issued with a severe warning as to his future conduct. Dublin County Board was fined €10,000 and issued with a severe warning as to the future conduct of their team". However, the affair carried on until the following month as both county boards exploited loopholes to avert the sanctions which had been imposed. The Central Appeals Committee (CAC) struck the suspensions out on a technicality. In the end Holmes was the only player suspended, on the basis that he had received a straight red card. The GAA's disciplinary system was tightened afterwards, with rule changes in a bid to prevent a similar occurrence happening again.

Dublin's full-back Barry Cahill later said: "We wanted to win the game but we wanted to mix it up as well where possible, so we were probably happy enough coming home on the bus… There was definitely a different feel to it… When we got back training, say in December time, we had that fixture ingrained into us… and even the week of training leading into that game. We knew that we were going up to try and lay down a marker… Maybe we were the ones that instigated it and brought that edge and helped create that bit of tension around the place". Cahill also blamed the layout of the stadium for creating the conditions for what had occurred during the game.

Years later, Dublin's so-called "Blue Book" had details from it leaked, including that the team intended the game in Omagh to be "a day when we crossed the line together like a Dublin squad hasn't done in years". Dublin "wanted to get one over on Tyrone, which they did that day and that was their target to win the game and they did that and maybe by whatever means possible".

== Legacy ==
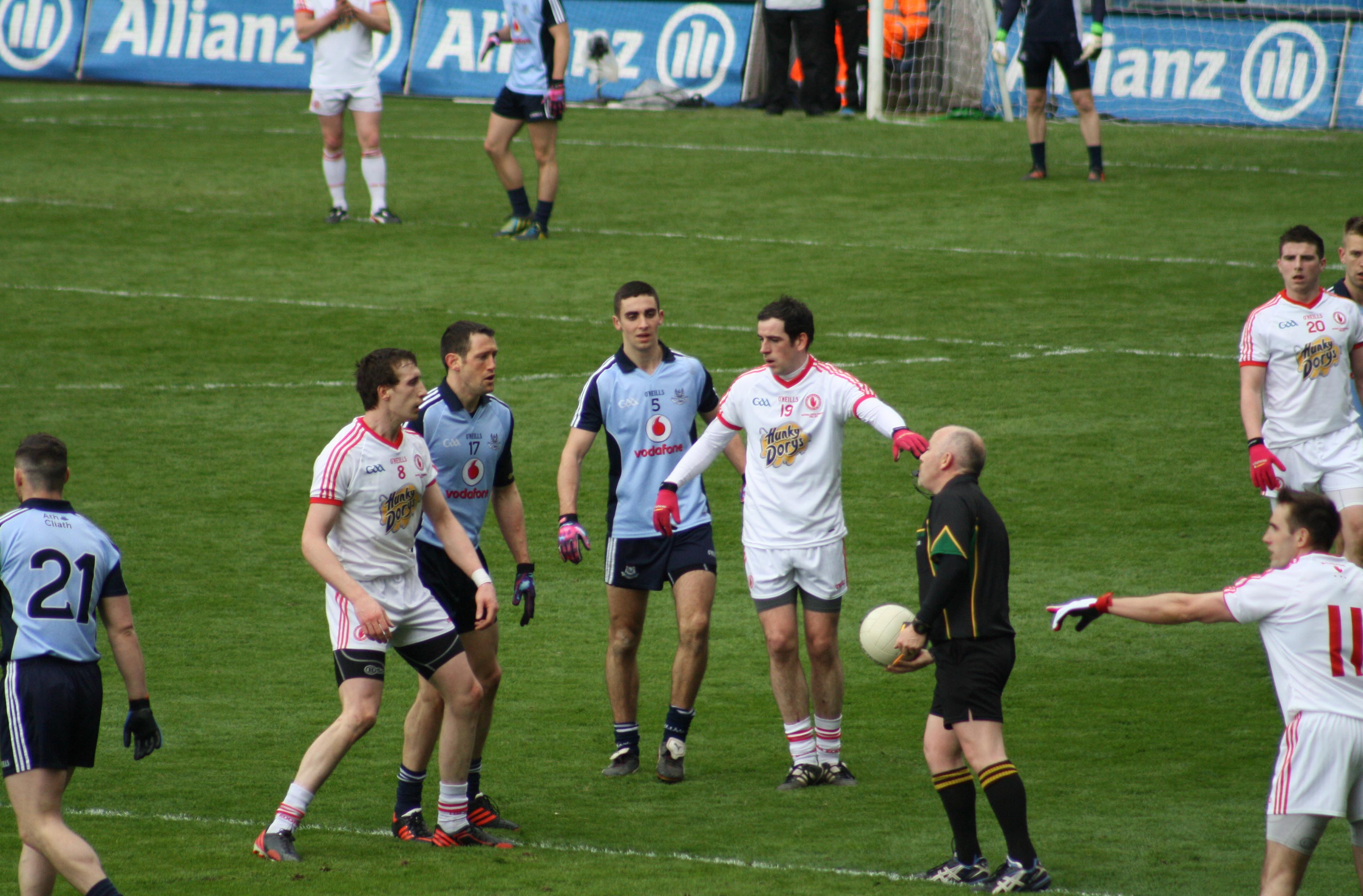
Dublin (blue) against Tyrone (white) in the 2013 National Football League final

Before the 2018 All-Ireland Senior Football Championship final (which paired Dublin and Tyrone), Up for the Match — the RTÉ television programme which is broadcast live on the eve of that competition's concluding game — reviewed the events of the Battle of Omagh.

The name was later applied to the same National Football League fixture in 2020, which took place on the weekend of Storm Jorge. During that game Dublin's Niall Scully was sent off and James McCarthy escaped a similar fate. Dublin manager Dessie Farrell said afterwards that a GAA official had informed him that the game would have been called off on account of Jorge's presence were it not being broadcast live on television. A brawl occurred in the tunnel at half-time.

In 2022, Pat McEnaney described the Battle of Omagh as "handbags stuff" beside the 1996 All-Ireland Senior Football Championship final, which he refereed, and which achieved notoriety for a mass brawl on the pitch involving most of the players from the competing teams, Mayo and Meath.

== Gallery ==
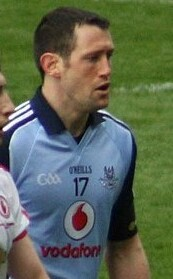
Denis Bastick was sent off for Dublin.

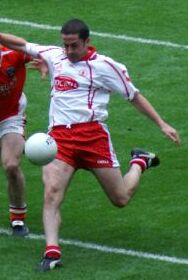
Stephen O'Neill was sent off for Tyrone.

== See also ==
- Other 21st-century games with a "Battle" title
  - Battle of Bramall Lane, a 2002 (English) First Division soccer match
  - Battle of Old Trafford, a 2003 (English) Premier League soccer match
  - Battle of the Buffet, a 2004 (English) Premier League soccer match
  - Battle of Nuremberg, a 2006 FIFA World Cup soccer match
  - Battle of Brookvale, a 2011 (Australian) National Rugby League match
  - Battle at Bristol, a 2016 (American) college football game
