= Alan Brogan =

Dublin Gaelic footballer

Personal information
- Native name: Ailéin Ó Brógáin (Irish)
- Born: 11 January 1982 (age 44) Dublin, Ireland
- Occupation: Sales Advisor
- Height: 1.83 m (6 ft 0 in)

Sport
- Sport: Gaelic football
- Position: Centre forward
Club
- Years: Club
- 1999–: St Oliver Plunketts/Eoghan Ruadh
Inter-county
Years	County	Apps (scores)
2002–2015	Dublin	70 (11–134)
Inter-county titles
- Leinster titles: 11
- All-Irelands: 3
- NFL: 3
- All Stars: 3

Alan Brogan (born 11 January 1982) is a Gaelic footballer from the St Oliver Plunketts/Eoghan Ruadh club who played for the Dublin county team from 2002 until his retirement in 2015. He can play in the full forward line but usually played centre half forward for Dublin.

From a famous family, Brogan, is the son of former all-Ireland winning and All Star player Bernard Snr and is the brother of Dublin players Bernard Jnr and Paul. His uncle Jim was also an inter-county footballer for Dublin. In September 2004, Brogan was appointed as St Oliver Plunkett Eoghan Ruadh's Games Promotion Officer. In 2008, he captained Dublin in the Championship, replacing Colin Moran.

Having represented county, province and country, Brogan won his first Leinster Senior Football Championship medal in 2002, won an All-Ireland under-21 medal with Dublin in 2003 and scored 9 points for Ireland in their 2004 International Rules Series victory over Australia.

== Playing career ==
=== Early years: 2002 – 2005 ===
Brogan made his debut for Dublin in 2002 against Wexford. Brogan finished the 2005 All-Ireland Senior Football Championship with 2–20 compared to his league total of 0–03. He was on the Dublin team that won the 2005 Leinster Senior Football Championship against Laois at Croke Park, finishing the game with just 0-01.

He was named on Ireland's preliminary international rules squad but opted out due to injury.

=== 1st and 2nd All Star years: 2006 – 2007 ===
In a controversial 2006 NFL game against Tyrone, Brogan was sent off for two yellow card offences and suspended for eight weeks in accordance with Rule 140. Brogan, Ciarán Whelan, Bryan Cullen and Kevin Bonner, along with Tyrone's Kevin Hughes, Michael McGee and Owen Mulligan were exonerated of all charges, the official reason given being 'a technicality'.

Brogan finished the 2006 season with only 0–06 in the O'Byrne Cup. His 2006 NFL tally was 1–08, well behind his Dublin counterparts Tomás Quinn 3–22 (2–0 pens, 0-13f, 0–4 '45') and Conal Keaney 2–12 (0-6f). He was part of the Dublin team that beat Offaly to win a Leinster senior title that year. He was tipped, by some (including those at the hoganstand.com) to win an All Star. Ahead of the Dublin Senior Club Football Championship quarter-final with his club St Oliver plunketts, Brogan was a doubt for the game after being taken off in the match with a suspected broken wrist. The injury proved minor and he went on to take Plunketts as far as a controversial loss against Na Fianna in the quarter-final of the 2006 Dublin championship. The club success continued with a Dublin league division two title which gives Brogans team automatic promotion to the top division in Dublin football which is Division one.

In 2006, he won his first All Star in the half forward line for his performances with Dublin. Seán Boylan named him in his compromise rules squad to play Australia in the first test at Pearse Stadium on 29 October 2006. Brogan was named on the inaugural GPA Gaelic Team of the Year which began in 2006. He was named at centre half-forward on the 2006 Dublin Bus/Evening Herald Blue Star football XV.

Brogan had a disappointing league campaign as Dublin were relegated from NFL division one in 2007. Yet he won the 2007 Leinster Senior Football Championship but Dublin were knocked out of the All-Ireland by Kerry in the semi-final. He was awarded an All Star at left half forward.

=== Dublin captaincy: 2008 ===
Brogan captained the 2008 Dublin senior team. He made his debut as captain against Carlow in the O'Byrne Cup. He won the Dublin AFL Division 1 title with his club St Oliver Plunketts Eoghan Ruadh. It was the first league title in the club's history. With Dublin he won the 2008 O'Byrne Cup by beating Longford in the final.

He won his fifth Leinster title in 2008, with Dublin beating Wexford by 3–23 to 0–9 and setting a new record biggest Leinster final win. Brogan scored 1–03.

=== Later years: 2009 – ===
In 2009, Brogan won another Leinster title with Dublin, but his season ended with defeat to Kerry in the All-Ireland quarter-final.

Brogan scored 0–03 points for Dublin against Wexford in the 2011 Leinster Senior Football Championship at Croke Park. Dublin finished the game as Leinster champions with a 2–12 to 1–12 win. In a repeat of the previous years All-Ireland quarter-final, Dublin were drawn against Tyrone. Brogan produced another solid performance for Dublin, scoring 0–03 in a game that forward Connolly dominated play. Dublin ended the game with a comfortable win at a packed Croke Park. The game ended 0–22 to 0–15 and Dublin went on to meet Ulster Champions Donegal the All-Ireland semi-final. Brogan failed to score a goal in a game that finished on a low scoreline of 0–08 to 0–06. Dublin were in an All-Ireland final for the first time since 1995 – their opponents, historical rivals Kerry. Brogan only scored 0–02. Dublin won 1–12 to 1–11, coming from behind in the last four minutes. On 21 October 2011, Brogan won his third All Star and succeeded brother Bernard as GAA/GPA Footballer of the Year.

On 20 September 2015, Brogan won his third All-Ireland title when Dublin defeated Kerry by 0–12 to 0–9 in the final. Brogan came on for the last four minutes of the game and got Dublin's last point of the game.

On 15 December 2015, Brogan announced his retirement from inter-county football. In a statement he said "Today I would like to announce my retirement from inter-county football. I leave behind a wonderfully gifted football team but take with me many great memories, friendships and bonds. I would like to thank all the players that I soldiered with and against, and the managers and mentors who have guided me from an early age when I began the pursuit of my sporting dreams."

== Career statistics ==
Team	Season	Leinster		All-Ireland		Total	
Team	Season	Apps	Score	Apps	Score	Apps	Score
Dublin	2002	3	1-06	3	0-05	6	1–11
Dublin	2003	2	1-03	2	0-00	4	1-03
Dublin	2004	1	0-03	5	2–14	6	2–17
Dublin	2005	4	2-08	2	0-04	6	2–12
Dublin	2006	3	0-07	2	0-08	5	0–15
Dublin	2007	4	2-05	2	0-06	6	2–11
Dublin	2008	3	2–12	1	0-00	4	2–12
Dublin	2009	3	0-09	1	0-03	4	0–12
Dublin	2010	2	0-02	5	0-08	7	0–10
Dublin	2011	3	0-08	3	0-05	6	0–13
Dublin	2012	3	0-05	1	0-00	4	0-05
Dublin	2013	0	0-00	0	0-00	0	0-00
Dublin	2014	3	0-04	2	0-05	5	0-09
Dublin	2015	3	0-04	4	0-02	7	0-06
Total		37	8–76	33	2–60	70	10–136

== Honours ==
County

- Leinster Senior Football Championship (11): 2002, 2005, 2006, 2007, 2008, 2009, 2011, 2012, 2013, 2014, 2015
- All-Ireland Senior Football Championship (3): 2011, 2013, 2015
- National Football League (3): 2013, 2014, 2015

Preceded by Colin Moran	Dublin Senior Football Captain; 2008	Succeeded by Paul Griffin
