= Enon =

Enon may refer to:

== Places ==
=== United States ===
- Enon, Kentucky
- Enon, Louisiana
- Enon, Moniteau County, Missouri
- Enon, St. Charles County, Missouri
- Enon, North Carolina
- Enon, Ohio
- Enon Valley, Pennsylvania
- Enon, Virginia
- Enon, West Virginia

=== Elsewhere ===
- Ænon, where John the Baptist baptised
- Enon, Nova Scotia, Canada
- Enon, South Africa
- Enon Chapel, a Baptist chapel which stood in London in the 19th century
- Enon Formation, a geological formation in South Africa

== Other uses ==
- Enon (band), an American indie band
- Enon (robot), created by Fujitsu
- Enon, a 2013 novel by Paul Harding
- Enon Kawatani, Japanese musician
- Enon Gavin (born 1971), Gaelic footballer from Ireland
- English National Opera North, now Opera North
