= 1996 All-Ireland Minor Football Championship =

Gaelic football competition

Championship details

All-Ireland Champions
- Winning team: Laois (1st win)

All-Ireland Finalists
- Losing team: Kerry

Provincial Champions
- Munster: Kerry
- Leinster: Laois
- Ulster: Donegal
- Connacht: Mayo

The 1996 All-Ireland Minor Football Championship was the 65th staging of the All-Ireland Minor Football Championship, the Gaelic Athletic Association's premier inter-county Gaelic football tournament for boys under the age of 18.

Westmeath entered the championship as defending champions, however, they were defeated in the Leinster Championship.

On 15 September 1996, Laois won the championship following a 2-11 to 1-11 defeat of Kerry in the All-Ireland final. This was their first All-Ireland title. It is the first of three titles they have won at this grade.

== Results ==
=== Connacht Minor Football Championship ===
Quarter-Final

May 1996 Quarter-Final	Sligo	2-11 - 1-8	Galway	Corofin

Semi-Finals

June 1996 Semi-Final	Mayo	3-9 - 1-3	Roscommon	Dr Hyde Park, Roscommon

June 1996 Semi-Final	Leitrim	1-8 - 3-10	Sligo	Páirc Seán Mac Diarmada, Carrick-on-Shannon

Final

21 July 1996 Final	Mayo	0-10 - 0-10	Sligo	McHale Park, Castlebar

27 July 1996 Final Replay	Mayo	2-3 - 0-8	Sligo	Markievicz Park, Sligo

=== Leinster Minor Football Championship ===
Preliminary Round

May 1996 Preliminary Round	Wexford	1-11 - 0-11	Wicklow	Wexford Park, Wexford

May 1996 Preliminary Round	Kildare	3-7 - 0-13	Longford	Pearse Park, Longford

May 1996 Preliminary Round	Kilkenny	1-6 - 0-11	Carlow	Callan

May 1996 Preliminary Round	Meath	0-12 - 0-12	Offaly	O'Connor Park, Tullamore

May 1996 Preliminary Round Replay	Meath	1-15 - 2-11	Offaly	Páirc Tailteann, Navan

Quarter-Finals

June 1996 Quarter-Final	Meath	0-13 - 0-3	Louth	Páirc Tailteann, Navan

June 1996 Quarter-Final	Laois	3-14 - 1-5	Wexford	Wexford Park, Wexford

June 1996 Quarter-Final	Kildare	1-10 - 2-8	Dublin	St Conleth's Park, Newbridge

June 1996 Quarter-Final	Carlow	1-5 - 3-9	Westmeath	Dr Cullen Park, Carlow

Semi-Finals

June 1996 Semi-Final	Dublin	0-10 - 0-8	Meath	Páirc Tailteann, Navan

July 1996 Semi-Final	Laois	1-11 - 1-9	Westmeath	Croke Park, Dublin

Final

28 July 1996 Final	Laois	0-15 - 2-9	Dublin	Croke Park, Dublin

5 August 1996 Final Replay	Laois	2-18 - 1-8	Dublin	O'Connor Park, Tullamore

=== Munster Minor Football Championship ===
Quarter-Finals

May 1996 Quarter-Final	Kerry	1-14 - 1-4	Limerick

May 1996 Quarter-Final	Cork	2-18 - 1-4	Tipperary	Páirc Uí Chaoimh, Cork

Semi-Finals

June 1996 Semi-Final	Cork	3-19 - 2-7	Clare	Semple Stadium, Thurles

June 1996 Semi-Final	Kerry	1-17 - 0-6	Waterford	Killorglin

Final

21 July 1996 Final	Kerry	3-9 - 2-6	Cork	Páirc Uí Chaoimh, Cork

=== Ulster Minor Football Championship ===
Preliminary Round

May 1996 Preliminary Round	Donegal	4-8 - 1-5	Down	St Tiernach's Park, Clones

Quarter-Finals

June 1996 Quarter-Final	Donegal	4-15 - 0-2	Monaghan	St. Molise Park, Irvinestown

June 1996 Quarter-Final	Derry	0-15 - 1-11	Armagh	Celtic Park, Derry

June 1996 Quarter-Final	Fermanagh	1-8 - 0-9	Tyrone	Healy Park, Omagh

June 1996 Quarter-Final	Antrim	1-11 - 1-7	Cavan	Casement Park, Belfast

Semi-Finals

June 1996 Semi-Final	Derry	0-18 - 1-9	Fermanagh	St Tiernach's Park, Clones

July 1996 Semi-Final	Antrim	0-3 - 4-20	Donegal	St Tiernach's Park, Clones

Final

28 July 1996 Final	Derry	0-9 - 0-9	Donegal	St Tiernach's Park, Clones

3 August 1996 Final Replay	Derry	1-5 - 0-9	Donegal	Healy Park, Omagh

=== All-Ireland Minor Football Championship ===
Semi-Finals

11 August 1996 Semi-Final	Kerry	1-8 - 0-9	Mayo	Croke Park, Dublin

18 August 1996 Semi-Final	Laois	1-10 - 2-8	Donegal	Croke Park, Dublin

Final

15 September 1996 Final	Laois	2-11 - 1-11	Kerry	Croke Park, Dublin

== Championship statistics ==
=== Miscellaneous ===
- Laois win the Leinster Championship for the first time since 1967.
