= Ciarán Whelan =

Dublin Gaelic footballer

Personal information
- Native name: Ciarán Ó Faoláin (Irish)
- Nickname: Whelo
- Born: 28 February 1976 (age 50) Raheny, County Dublin, Ireland
- Height: 6 ft 4 in (193 cm)

Sport
- Sport: Gaelic football
- Position: Midfield
Club
- Years: Club
- 1982–2011: Raheny
Inter-county*
Years	County	Apps (scores)
1996–2009	Dublin	53
Inter-county titles
- Leinster titles: 6
- All-Irelands: 0
- All Stars: 2
- *Inter County team apps and scores correct as of 11:28, 2 September 2008 (UTC).

Ciarán Whelan (born 28 February 1976 in Raheny, County Dublin) is a Gaelic footballer who plays for the Raheny club and, formerly, for the Dublin county team. He is right-footed but can kick with both feet and usually plays in midfield. He was a member of the Dublin squad between 1996 and 2009. He never won an All-Ireland, and is to this day known as possibly one of the best high-fielders in the country.

Lately, Whelan has become a Gaelic football pundit for RTÉ's The Sunday Game.

== Playing career ==
=== All-Ireland Senior Football Championship ===
He collected six Leinster Senior Football Championship medals coming in 2002, 2005 and 2006 and 2007, 2008 and 2009. He finished the 2005 Leinster and All-Ireland Championships with a total of three points compared to the one goal and ten points he scored in the league. He captained the Dublin side in 2003 and 2004. He also won an All Star in 1999 and has been nominated many times, his last nomination coming in 2005 the same year in which he captained Leinster in the Railway Cup. He has started the 2006 Championship well, with a solid performance against Longford and then a far better performance against Laois, a game in which he dominated midfield. He played a 'man of the match' performance against Offaly in the Leinster final and set up Jason Sherlock for the winning goal. Unfortunately, Whelan suffered an eye injury against Westmeath which forced him off and also affected him in the defeat to Mayo. Whelan showed his reckless side with a poor tackle on Mayo's Ronan McGarrity which forced McGarrity off. He was nominated for an all-star for his 2006 performances in Midfield with Dublin.

Whelan was awarded his second all-star in October 2007 at the Vodafone all-stars awards ceremony. Ciaran's best point from play in Croke Park was against Kildare in the Leinster Final of 2000. With Dublin leading by 4 points in the first half, Whelan made a surging run of 30 metres and ploughed a beautiful point off his left (weaker) side from 45 metres in to the Hill 16 end. Dublin would ultimately self-destruct in the second half of that final. Another marvellous point came a year later in Thurles against Kerry in the first quarter final game. In the second half Dublin were down by 2 points and Whelan made a trademark surge down the touchline and made a brilliant point from 30-metre range right on the side line. This point was scored in the Killinan end of the ground with Dublin supporters situated here. He announced his retirement from inter-county football on 1 September 2009.

=== National Football League ===
Whelan received a suspension of eight weeks in the controversial 2006 National League clash between Dublin and Tyrone. A game which resulted in disciplinary action against 9 players involved in the game. Whelan, Bryan Cullen, Kevin Bonner and Alan Brogan were all exonerated from all charges along with the Tyrone trio of Kevin Hughes, Michael McGee and Owen Mulligan. The official reason given for the exoneration was stated as 'a technicality'.

He finished the 2006 National Football League with a single point.

=== Railway Cup ===
Whelan was captain on the winning side for Leinster against Ulster in the 2005 Railway Cup which was played in Parnell Park. Leinster claimed the Martin Donnelly Cup for the 28th time.

=== Club football ===
Whelan plays his club football for Raheny, a Dublin AFL Division 1 side on the northside of County Dublin. Whelan played in the side that won the 2007 Division 2 playoff to win participation in Division 1 for the 2008 season.

=== International rules football ===
Whelan helped Ireland defeat Australia in the 1999 International Rules Series by scoring a Goal and an Over. He also played in the 2001 International Rules Series.

== Championship appearances ==
#	Date	Venue	Opponent	Score	Result	Competition
1	30 July 1996	Croke Park, Dublin	Meath	0–2	0–8 : 0–10	Leinster Championship final
2	27 May 2001	Croke Park, Dublin	Longford	0–5	2–19 : 1–13	Leinster Championship Quarter final
3	17 June 2001	Croke Park, Dublin	Offaly	–	1–12 : 0–13	Leinster Championship Semi-final
4	15 July 2001	Croke Park, Dublin	Meath	0–3	0–14 : 2–11	Leinster Championship final
5	22 July 2001	Croke Park, Dublin	Sligo	1–2	3–17 : 0–12	Qualifiers Round 4
6	4 August 2001	Semple Stadium, Thurles	Kerry	0–1	2–11 : 1–14	All-Ireland Quarter final
7	11 August 2001	Semple Stadium, Thurles	Kerry	0–1	1–12 : 2–12	All-Ireland Quarter final replay
8	1 June 2002	Dr. Cullen Park, Carlow	Wexford	0–2	0–15 : 1–10	Leinster Championship Quarter final
9	23 June 2002	Croke Park, Dublin	Meath	–	2–11 : 0–10	Leinster Championship Semi-final
10	14 July 2002	Croke Park, Dublin	Kildare	0–1	2–13 : 2–11	Leinster Championship Final
11	5 August 2002	Croke Park, Dublin	Donegal	0–1	2–8 : 0–14	All-Ireland Quarter final
12	17 August 2002	Croke Park, Dublin	Donegal	0–4	1–14 : 0–7	All-Ireland Quarter final replay
13	1 September 2002	Croke Park, Dublin	Armagh	1–1	1–13 : 1–14	All-Ireland Semi-final
14	1 June 2003	Croke Park, Dublin	Louth	0–3	1–19 : 0–9	Leinster Championship Quarter final
15	15 June 2003	Croke Park, Dublin	Laois	–	0–14 : 0–16	Leinster Championship Semi-final
16	28 June 2003	St. Tiernach's Park, Clones	Derry	0–1	3–9 : 1–9	Qualifiers Round 2
17	5 July 2003	Croke Park, Dublin	Armagh	–	0–11 : 0–15	Qualifiers Round 3
18	6 June 2004	Croke Park, Dublin	Westmeath	–	0–12 : 0–14	Leinster Championship Quarter final
19	12 June 2004	Parnell Park, Dublin	London	–	3–24 : 0–6	Qualifiers Round 1
20	3 July 2004	Carrick on Shannon, Leitrim	Leitrim	–	1–13 : 0–4	Qualifiers Round 2
21	10 July 2004	O'Moore Park, Portlaoise	Longford	0–3	1–17 : 0–11	Qualifiers Round 3
22	1 August 2004	Croke Park, Dublin	Roscommon	0–2	1–14 : 0–13	Qualifiers Round 4
23	14 August 2004	Croke Park, Dublin	Kerry	–	1–8 : 1–15	All-Ireland Quarter final
24	15 May 2005	Croke Park, Dublin	Longford	0–1	2–23 : 0–10	Leinster Championship Preliminary Quarter final
25	5 June 2005	Croke Park, Dublin	Meath	–	1–12 : 1–10	Leinster Championship Quarter final
26	19 June 2005	Croke Park, Dublin	Wexford	0–1	1–17 : 2–10	Leinster Championship Semi-final
27	17 July 2005	Croke Park, Dublin	Laois	0–1	0–14 : 0–13	Leinster Championship Final
28	13 August 2005	Croke Park, Dublin	Tyrone	–	1–14 : 1–14	All-Ireland Quarter final
29	27 August 2005	Croke Park, Dublin	Tyrone	–	1–14 : 2–18	All-Ireland Quarter final replay
30	4 June 2006	Pearse Park, Longford	Longford	–	1–12 : 0–13	Leinster Championship Quarter final
31	25 June 2006	Croke Park, Dublin	Laois	–	3–17 : 0–12	Leinster Championship Semi-final
32	16 July 2006	Croke Park, Dublin	Offaly	–	1–15 : 0–9	Leinster Championship Final
33	13 August 2006	Croke Park, Dublin	Westmeath	–	1–12 : 0–5	All-Ireland Quarter final
34	27 August 2006	Croke Park, Dublin	Mayo	–	2–12 : 1–16	All-Ireland Semi-final
35	3 June 2007	Croke Park, Dublin	Meath	0–1	1–11 : 0–14	Leinster Championship Quarter final
36	17 June 2007	Croke Park, Dublin	Meath	0–1	0–16 : 0–12	Leinster Championship Quarter final replay
37	24 June 2007	Croke Park, Dublin	Offaly	0–1	1–12 : 0–10	Leinster Championship Semi-final
38	15 July 2007	Croke Park, Dublin	Laois	0–2	3–14 : 1–14	Leinster Championship Final
39	11 August 2007	Croke Park, Dublin	Derry	–	0–18 : 0–15	All-Ireland Quarter final
40	26 August 2007	Croke Park, Dublin	Kerry	–	0–16 : 1–15	All-Ireland Semi-final
41	29 June 2008	Croke Park, Dublin	Westmeath	0–1	0–13 : 1–8	Leinster Championship Semi-final
42	20 July 2008	Croke Park, Dublin	Wexford	–	3–23 : 0–9	Leinster Championship Final
43	16 August 2008	Croke Park, Dublin	Tyrone	–	1–8 : 3–14	All-Ireland Quarter final
44	7 June 2009	Croke Park, Dublin	Meath	–	0–14 : 0–12	Leinster Championship Quarter final
45	28 June 2009	Croke Park, Dublin	Westmeath	0–1	4–26 : 0–11	Leinster Championship Semi-final
46	12 July 2009	Croke Park, Dublin	Kildare	0–1	2–15 : 0–18	Leinster Championship Final
47	3 August 2009	Croke Park, Dublin	Kerry	–	1–7 : 1–24	All-Ireland Quarter final

Sporting positions
Preceded by Coman Goggins	Dublin Senior Football Captain; 2003–2004	Succeeded by Paddy Christie
