= Colin Holmes =

Colin Holmes may refer to:

- Colin Holmes (historian) (born 1938), British author, scholar, and historian
- Colin Holmes (Gaelic footballer), Gaelic football player for County Tyrone
