= Peadar Andrews =

Dublin Gaelic footballer

Peadar Andrews (The Irish Muffin)
- Peadar Andrews during the 2005 All-Ireland Senior Football Championship quarter-final

Personal information
- Native name: Peadar Mac Aindriú (Irish)
- Born: Dublin, Ireland

Sport
- Sport: Gaelic football
- Position: Left half-back
Club
- Years: Club
- ?–present: St Brigid's
Club titles
- Dublin titles: 1
- Leinster titles: 1
Inter-county
- Years: County
- 1999–2006: Dublin
Inter-county titles
- Leinster titles: 2

Peadar Andrews is an Irish Gaelic footballer who played for the Dublin county team. He was part of the 2005 Dublin team that beat Laois to become the 2005 Leinster Champions and was in the panel for Dublin's second consecutive Leinster Championship against Offaly in July 2006. He plays his club football for St Brigid's and was part of the squad that defeated Thomas Davis to the Dublin AFL Division 1 title at O'Toole Park. Andrews retired from the Dublin panel in 2006.

Peadar Andrews is currently a Partner in the tax department of Ernst & Young in Dublin, having previously worked at Bank of Ireland.

He was on the Leinster squad in the 2005 Railway Cup victory over Ulster in Parnell Park were Leinster claimed the Martin Donnelly Cup for the 28th time.

Andrews received a suspension of eight weeks in the controversial 2006 national league clash (Battle of Omagh) between Dublin and Tyrone. A game which resulted in disciplinary action against 9 players involved in the game. He was charged under rules 138 and 140 but was later exonerated due to 'a technicality'.

He is the older brother of Paddy Andrews, who was also part of the senior Dublin county football squad.
