= Ger Brady =

Irish Gaelic footballer (1980–2024)

Personal information
- Native name: Gearóid Ó Brádaigh (Irish)
- Born: 4 January 1980 County Mayo, Ireland
- Died: 21 March 2024 (aged 44) Mayo, County Mayo, Ireland
- Occupation: Garda
- Height: 6 ft 1 in (185 cm)

Sport
- Sport: Gaelic football
- Position: Centre forward
Club
- Years: Club
- Claremorris GAA
Club titles
- Mayo titles: 4
- Connacht titles: 3
- All-Ireland Titles: 1
Inter-county
- Years: County
- 2003–2007: Mayo
Inter-county titles
- Connacht titles: 1
- All-Irelands: 0
- NFL: 0
- All Stars: 0

Ger Brady (4 January 1980 – 21 March 2024) was an Irish Gaelic footballer who played for Claremorris and the Mayo county team. He played centre half-forward or, alternatively, left half-forward or, most often, as a utility playmaker.

== Biography ==
Brady was born on 4 January 1980.

He played for Mayo in the 1997 All-Ireland Minor Football Championship defeat to Laois. He also played for the Mayo senior team.

He was based in Co. Galway, working as a bank consultant. Brady died of complications from motor neurone disease at a hospital in County Mayo, on 21 March 2024. He was 44.
