= 1997 All-Ireland Minor Football Championship =

Gaelic football competition

Championship details

All-Ireland Champions
- Winning team: Laois (2nd win)

All-Ireland Finalists
- Losing team: Tyrone

Provincial Champions
- Munster: Kerry
- Leinster: Laois
- Ulster: Tyrone
- Connacht: Mayo

The 1997 All-Ireland Minor Football Championship was the 66th staging of the All-Ireland Minor Football Championship, the Gaelic Athletic Association's premier inter-county Gaelic football tournament for boys under the age of 18.

Laois entered the championship as defending champions.

On 28 September 1997, Laois won the championship following a 3–11 to 1–14 defeat of Tyrone in the All-Ireland final. This was their second All-Ireland title overall and their second title in succession.

== Results ==
=== Connacht Minor Football Championship ===
Quarter-Final

June 1997 Quarter-Final	Mayo	0-9 - 0-6	Galway	McHale Park, Castlebar

Semi-Finals

29 June 1997 Semi-Final	Mayo	2-15 - 1-9	Leitrim	McHale Park, Castlebar

6 July 1997 Semi-Final	Sligo	1-8 - 2-7	Roscommon	Markievicz Park, Sligo

Final

3 August 1997 Final	Mayo	0-13 - 0-9	Roscommon	Dr Hyde Park, Roscommon

=== Leinster Minor Football Championship ===
Preliminary Round

May 1997 Preliminary Round	Wicklow	2-11 - 1-8	Wexford	Páirc Uí Shíocháin, Gorey

May 1997 Preliminary Round	Kildare	0-13 - 0-8	Louth	O'Moore Park, Portlaoise

May 1997 Preliminary Round	Longford	0-16 - 1-7	Westmeath	Pearse Park, Longford

May 1997 Preliminary Round	Laois	0-9 - 0-8	Offaly	O'Moore Park, Portlaoise

Quarter-Finals

June 1997 Quarter-Final	Wicklow	2-9 - 0-5	Carlow	Aughrim Park, Aughrim

June 1997 Quarter-Final	Kildare	0-13 - 2-8	Dublin	St Conleth's Park, Newbridge

June 1997 Quarter-Final	Meath	1-16 - 0-9	Longford	Pearse Park, Longford

June 1997 Quarter-Final	Laois	2-14 - 4-5	Kilkenny	O'Moore Park, Portlaoise

Semi-Finals

July 1997 Semi-Final	Dublin	0-10 - 2-6	Wicklow	Páirc Tailteann, Navan

July 1997 Semi-Final	Laois	1-12 - 0-7	Meath	Croke Park, Dublin

Final

16 August 1997 Final	Laois	4-12 - 1-7	Wicklow	Croke Park, Dublin

=== Munster Minor Football Championship ===
Preliminary Round

May 1997 Preliminary Round	Waterford	1-4 - 2-16	Tipperary	Ned Hall Park, Clonmel

Quarter-Final

May 1997 Quarter-Final	Limerick	3-9 - 3-7	Tipperary	Ned Hall Park, Clonmel

Semi-Finals

June 1997 Semi-Final	Kerry	0-12 - 0-5	Cork	Austin Stack Park, Tralee

June 1997 Semi-Final	Clare	0-7 - 1-6	Limerick	Cusack Park, Ennis

Final

20 July 1997 Final	Kerry	4-12 - 1-7	Limerick	Gaelic Grounds, Limerick

=== Ulster Minor Football Championship ===
Preliminary Round

May 1997 Preliminary Round	Tyrone	2-10 - 1-8	Down	St Tiernach's Park, Clones

Quarter-Finals

June 1997 Quarter-Final	Donegal	0-14 - 4-3	Antrim	MacCumhaill Park, Ballybofey

June 1997 Quarter-Final	Monaghan	2-10 - 2-6	Derry	St Tiernach's Park, Clones

June 1997 Quarter-Final	Cavan	3-16 - 2-5	Fermanagh	St Tiernach's Park, Clones

June 1997 Quarter-Final	Tyrone	1-10 - 0-9	Armagh	Healy Park, Omagh

Semi-Finals

June 1997 Semi-Final	Antrim	1-9 - 0-9	Cavan	St Tiernach's Park, Clones

June 1997 Semi-Final	Monaghan	3-7 - 4-14	Tyrone	St Tiernach's Park, Clones

Final

20 July 1997 Final	Antrim	2-10 - 3-13	Tyrone	St Tiernach's Park, Clones

=== All-Ireland Minor Football Championship ===
Semi-Finals

24 August 1997 Semi-Final	Kerry	1-11 - 1-11	Tyrone	Croke Park, Dublin

31 August 1997 Semi-Final	Laois	3-8 - 1-9	Mayo	Croke Park, Dublin

6 September 1997 Semi-Final Replay	Kerry	0-21 - 0-23	Tyrone	Parnell Park, Dublin

Final

28 September 1997 Final	Laois	3-11 - 1-14	Tyrone	Croke Park, Dublin
