= Mark Harte =

Irish Gaelic footballer and manager

Personal information
- Native name: Marc Ó hAirt (Irish)
- Born: 1979 (age 46–47) Ballygawley, County Tyrone, Northern Ireland
- Occupation: Secondary school teacher

Sport
- Sport: Gaelic football
- Position: Midfield
Club
- Years: Club
- Errigal Ciarán
Club titles
- Tyrone titles: 3
- Ulster titles: 1
Inter-county
- Years: County
- 2003-2005: Tyrone
Inter-county titles
- Ulster titles: 1
- All-Irelands: 2
- NFL: 0
- All Stars: 0

Mark Harte (born 1979) is a Gaelic football manager and former player. His league and championship career at senior level with the Tyrone county team lasted three seasons from 2003 until 2005.

== Career ==
Born in Ballygawley, County Tyrone, Harte was raised in a strong Gaelic football family. His father, Mickey Harte, played with the Tyrone senior team between 1975 and 1982 before later going on to become the team's most successful manager.

At club level Harte played with Errigal Ciarán and enjoyed much success. In 2002 he won an Ulster medal with the club, while he also won three county senior championship medals.

Harte made his debut on the inter-county scene when he was selected for the Tyrone minor team. An Ulster medal winner in 1997, he ended the season as an All-Ireland runner-up. Harte subsequently joined the Tyrone senior team, winning an All-Ireland medal in his final season in 2000. Three years later he was added to the senior panel. Over the course of the following three seasons Harte won two All-Ireland medals and one Ulster medal.

In retirement from playing, Harte became involved in team management and coaching. He has served as joint-manager of the Pomeroy Plunketts and Ballinderry Shamrocks club teams.

Harte has also worked in the media as a Gaelic football analyst for GAA Beo on TG4.

== Honours ==
=== Player ===
Errigal Ciarán

- Ulster Senior Club Football Championship (1): 2002
- Tyrone Senior Football Championship (3): 1997, 2000, 2002

Tyrone

- All-Ireland Senior Football Championship (2): 2003, 2005
- Ulster Senior Football Championship (1): 2003
- All-Ireland Under-21 Football Championship (1): 2000
- Ulster Under-21 Football Championship (1): 2000
- Ulster Minor Football Championship (1): 1997

=== Manager ===
Pomeroy Plunketts

- Ulster Intermediate Club Football Championship (1): 2016
- Tyrone Intermediate Football Championship (1): 2016
