= Tomás Quinn =

Irish gaelic footballer

Personal information
- Native name: Tomás Ó Cuinn (Irish)
- Born: Dublin, Ireland
- Height: 1.83 m (6 ft 0 in)

Sport
- Sport: Gaelic football
- Position: Left corner forward
Club
- Years: Club
- 2000–: St Vincents
Club titles
- Dublin titles: 5
- Leinster titles: 4
- All-Ireland Titles: 2
Inter-county
Years	County	Apps (scores)
2003–2012	Dublin	81 (21–213)
Inter-county titles
- Leinster titles: 7
- All-Irelands: 1

Tomás 'Mossy' Quinn (Irish: Tomás Ó Cuinn) is an Irish Gaelic footballer from Dublin who plays for the St Vincents club and, formerly, for the Dublin county team.

== Biography ==
Sometimes known as Mossy Quinn, he attended Ardscoil Rís in Marino.

He made his debut for Dublin in the opening match of the 2003 National Football League against Armagh. Quinn was part of the Dublin panel that won the All-Ireland Senior Football championship in 2011. On 2 November 2012, Quinn retired as an inter-county player.

He was the free-taker for the senior Dublin team. He has finished the last two seasons in the league as the top scorer for his county and finished as top scorer in the 2003 - 2007 championships. Quinn had been coached by former Dublin player and club-mate Jimmy Keaveney. He played 81 times for Dublin and is currently 9th all time in career top scorers for Dublin senior football with 21 goals and 213 points.

After retiring from the inter-county game, Quinn was an integral part of the St Vincent's team that won Dublin and Leinster SFC in 2013 and then the All-Ireland Club title versus Castlebar Mitchells on St Patrick's Day at Croke Park. St Vincent's retained their Dublin and Leinster SFC crowns in 2014 but were beaten by eventual winners Corofin in the All-Ireland semi-final in Feb 2015. Quinn again played a key role in St Vincent's winning the Dublin SFC, with a man of the match performance in the 2016 final against Castleknock. He collected his fourth Leinster club title after defeating Offaly champions Rhode but Vincent's were beaten by Derry champions Slaughtneil in the All-Ireland final in Feb 2017.

Quinn had previously captained St. Vincents to their first Dublin SFC in 23 years in 2007 beating St. Brigids by 1 point in the final. They went on to win the Leinster Club Championship and added All-Ireland honours on St Patricks Day 2008 defeating Nemo Rangers from Cork in Croke Park. Quinn scored 0-7 and laid on a goal for team mate Diarmuid Connolly.

In January 2014, Quinn took up his role as Commercial and Marketing Director for Dublin GAA, the first role of its kind for GAA counties. He later moved to Shelbourne as CEO.

He is also and independent director for Golf Ireland.

== National League appearances ==
#	Date	Venue	Opponent	Score	Result	Competition
1	2 February 2003	Parnell Park, Dublin	Armagh	0–3	0–7 : 1–15	National Football League Round 1
2	9 February 2003	Ballyshannon, Donegal	Donegal	1–5	1–10 : 0–9	National Football League Round 2
3	16 February 2003	Parnell Park, Dublin	Tyrone	0–1	0–12 : 0–11	National Football League Round 3
4	2 March 2003	Fitzgerald Stadium, Killarney	Kerry	0–3	0–14 : 2–11	National Football League Round 4
5	23 March 2003	Dr. Hyde Park, Roscommon	Roscommon	0–2	0–17 : 0–14	National Football League Round 6
6	6 April 2003	Parnell Park, Dublin	Galway	–	0–12 : 1–9	National Football League Round 7
7	1 February 2004	Parnell Park, Dublin	Tyrone	0–1	0–9 : 0–8	National Football League Round 1
8	8 February 2004	McHale Park, Castlebar	Mayo	0–1	0–3 : 1–10	National Football League Round 2
9	15 February 2004	Parnell Park, Dublin	Kerry	0–4	0–12 : 1–12	National Football League Round 3
10	7 March 2004	Cusack Park, Mullingar	Westmeath	0–4	0–15 : 0–10	National Football League Round 4
11	14 March 2004	Brewster Park, Enniskillen	Fermanagh	0–3	0–12 : 0–12	National Football League Round 5
12	4 April 2004	Parnell Park, Dublin	Longford	0–4	2–12 : 2–9	National Football League Round 7
13	5 February 2005	Parnell Park, Dublin	Mayo	2–2	2–13 : 1–15	National Football League Round 1
15	13 February 2005	Healy Park, Omagh	Tyrone	0–4	0–9 : 1–10	National Football League Round 2
16	5 March 2005	Austin Stack Park, Tralee	Kerry	0–1	2–11 : 2–13	National Football League Round 3
17	12 March 2005	Parnell Park, Dublin	Westmeath	0–7	0–11 : 0–9	National Football League Round 4
18	20 March 2005	Parnell Park, Dublin	Donegal	1–4	1–11 : 0–13	National Football League Round 5
19	26 March 2005	Páirc Uí Rinn, Cork	Cork	0–3	1–6 : 0–18	National Football League Round 6
20	3 April 2005	O'Connor Park, Tullamore	Offaly	1–2	1–13 : 2–6	National Football League Round 7
21	5 February 2006	Healy Park, Omagh	Tyrone	1–7	1–9 : 1–6	National Football League Round 1
22	12 February 2006	Parnell Park, Dublin	Monaghan	0–4	0–7 : 1–11	National Football League Round 2
23	4 March 2006	Parnell Park, Dublin	Offaly	0–2	1–10 : 3–2	National Football League Round 3
24	11 March 2006	Páirc Uí Rinn, Cork	Cork	0–2	1–10 : 1–11	National Football League Round 4
25	19 March 2006	Brewster Park, Fermanagh	Fermanagh	0–5	0–8 : 0–9	National Football League Round 5
26	25 March 2006	Parnell Park, Dublin	Mayo	2–2	4–10 : 1–10	National Football League Round 6
27	10 February 2007	Gaelic Grounds, Limerick	Limerick	0–4	0–14 : 1–10	National Football League Round 2
28	25 February 2007	Ballyshannon, Donegal	Donegal	–	0–5 : 0–9	National Football League Round 3
29	10 March 2007	Parnell Park, Dublin	Cork	0–5	1–13 : 0–7	National Football League Round 4
29	24 March 2007	Parnell Park, Dublin	Fermanagh	1–1	3–15 : 0–7	National Football League Round 5
30	1 April 2007	McHale Park, Castlebar	Mayo	0–1	0–9 : 0–10	National Football League Round 6
31	5 April 2008	Parnell Park, Dublin	Roscommon	1–3	3–20 : 0–7	National Football League Round 6
32	20 April 2008	Parnell Park, Dublin	Meath	0–6	0–13 : 2–6	National Football League Round 7
33	22 March 2009	Ballina, Mayo	Mayo	–	0–9 : 0–9	National Football League Round 5
34	12 April 2009	Parnell Park, Dublin	Westmeath	–	5–22 : 0–10	National Football League Round 7
35	6 February 2011	Athletic Grounds, Armagh	Armagh GAA	– 0-2	2-21 : 1-11	National Football League Round 1
36	19 February 2011	Croke Park, Dublin	Cork GAA	– 1-1	3-13 : 0–16	National Football League Round 2
37	26 Feb 2011	Croke Park, Dublin	Kerry	– 1-1	3-10 : 1-15	National Football League Round 3
38	13 March 2011	St Tiarnachs Park, Clones	Monaghan	–0-1	0-13 : 1-9	National Football League Round 4
39	20 March 2011	Croke Park, Dublin	Mayo GAA	– 1-7	4-15 : 3-13	National Football League Round 5
40	2 April 2011	Croke Park, Dublin	Down	– 0-4	2-10 : 0–13	National Football League Round 6
41	24 April 2011	Croke Park, Dublin	Cork	– 1-2	2-14 : 0–21	National Football League Final
42	4 Feb 2012	Croke Park, Dublin	Kerry	– 0-4	0-11 : 1-14	National Football League Round 1
43	3 March 2012	O'Moore Park, Portlaoise	Laois	– 0-2	1-14 : 0–9	National Football League Round 2
44	11 March 2012	Croke Park, Dublin	Armagh	– 1-4	4-17 : 1-11	National Football League Round 3
45	18 March 2012	Pairc Esler, Newry	Down	–	0-15 : 1-10	National Football League Round 4
46	24 March 2012	Croke Park, Dublin	Donegal	– 0-1	2-16 : 0-13	National Football League Round 5
47	1 April 2012	McHale Park, Mayo	Mayo	– 0-2	0-20 : 0–8	National Football League Round 6

== Championship appearances ==
#	Date	Venue	Opponent	Score	Result	Competition
1	1 June 2003	Croke Park, Dublin	Louth	0–3	1–19 : 0–9	Leinster Championship Quarter final
2	15 June 2003	Croke Park, Dublin	Laois	0–3	0–14 : 0–16	Leinster Championship Semi final
3	28 June 2003	St. Tiernach's Park, Derry	Derry	–	3–9 : 1–9	Qualifiers Round 2
4	12 June 2004	Parnell Park, Dublin	London	1–5	3–24 : 0–6	Qualifiers Round 1
5	3 July 2004	Carrick on Shannon, Leitrim	Leitrim	0–3	1–13 : 0–4	Qualifiers Round 2
6	10 July 2004	O'Moore Park, Portlaoise	Longford	0–5	1–17 : 0–11	Qualifiers Round 3
7	1 August 2004	Croke Park, Dublin	Roscommon	–	1–14 : 0–13	Qualifiers Round 4
8	14 August 2004	Croke Park, Dublin	Kerry	–	1–8 : 1–15	All Ireland Quarter final
9	15 May 2005	Croke Park, Dublin	Longford	0–5	2–23 : 0–10	Leinster Championship Preliminary Quarter final
10	5 June 2005	Croke Park, Dublin	Meath	0–1	1–12 : 1–10	Leinster Championship Quarter final
11	19 June 2005	Croke Park, Dublin	Wexford	0–10	1–17 : 2–10	Leinster Championship Semi final
12	17 July 2005	Croke Park, Dublin	Laois	0–4	0–14 : 0–13	Leinster Championship Final
13	13 August 2005	Croke Park, Dublin	Tyrone	1–7	1–14 : 1–14	All Ireland Quarter final
14	27 August 2005	Croke Park, Dublin	Tyrone	0–2	1–14 : 2–18	All Ireland Quarter final replay
15	4 June 2006	Pearse Park, Longford	Longford	0–2	1–12 : 0–13	Leinster Championship Quarter final
16	25 June 2006	Croke Park, Dublin	Laois	2–3	3–17 : 0–12	Leinster Championship Semi final
17	16 July 2006	Croke Park, Dublin	Offaly	0–8	1–15 : 0–9	Leinster Championship Final
18	13 August 2006	Croke Park, Dublin	Westmeath	1–2	1–12 : 0–5	All Ireland Quarter final
19	27 August 2006	Croke Park, Dublin	Mayo	0–2	2–12 : 1–16	All-Ireland Semi final
20	3 June 2007	Croke Park, Dublin	Meath	0–3	1–11 : 0–14	Leinster Championship Quarter final
21	17 June 2007	Croke Park, Dublin	Meath	0–1	0–16 : 0–12	Leinster Championship Quarter final replay
22	24 June 2007	Croke Park, Dublin	Offaly	0–1	1–12 : 0–10	Leinster Championship Semi final
23	15 July 2007	Croke Park, Dublin	Laois	0–1	3–14 : 1–14	Leinster Championship Final
24	11 August 2007	Croke Park, Dublin	Derry	–	0–18 : 0–15	All Ireland Quarter final
25	26 August 2007	Croke Park, Dublin	Kerry	–	0–16 : 1–15	All-Ireland Semi final
26	8 June 2008	Croke Park, Dublin	Louth	0–6	1–22 : 0–12	Leinster Championship Quarter final
27	29 June 2008	Croke Park, Dublin	Westmeath	0–3	0–13 : 1–8	Leinster Championship Semi final
28	20 July 2008	Croke Park, Dublin	Wexford	0–5	3–23 : 0–9	Leinster Championship Final
29	16 August 2008	Croke Park, Dublin	Tyrone	0–2	1–8 : 3–14	All Ireland Quarter final
30	28 June 2009	Croke Park, Dublin	Westmeath	1–1	4–26 : 0–11	Leinster Championship Semi final
31	13 June 2010	Croke Park, Dublin	Wexford	0–4	2–16 : 0–15	Leinster Championship Quarter final
32	27 June 2010	Croke Park, Dublin	Meath	0–7	0–13 : 5–9	Leinster Championship Semi final
33	24 July 2010	Croke Park, Dublin	Louth	0–1	2–14 : 0–13	Qualifier
34	5 June 2011	Croke Park, Dublin	Laois	0–1	1-16 : 0–11	Leinster Championship Quarter-Final
35	10 July 2011	Croke Park, Dublin	Wexford		2-12 : 1-12	Leinster Championship Final
36	4 August 2012	Croke Park, Dublin	Laois	0–1	1-12 : 0–12	Quarter-Final

== Yearly performance ==
=== 2005 ===
In the 2005 league Quinn became Dublin's first choice free taker. Throughout the National Football League he showed he could hold his nerve scoring the winning points in two matches from dead balls. He finished the NFL campaign with 4–23 (0-13f, 1–0 pen, 0–2 '45').

Quinn was on the Dublin panel that beat Laois in the Leinster Senior Football Championship Final at Croke Park. He scored a total of four points in the final with two being of special note both scored in the dying minutes. The first drew the teams level while the second was the match winning point.

He finished the 2005 All-Ireland and Leinster Championships with a total of 1–29, which confirmed him as the top scoring player from Leinster. He finished in fifth top scorer as the All-Ireland Championship due to a lack of progress on Dublin's part in the 2005 Championship.

=== 2006 ===
He finished the 2006 NFL campaign as top scorer for the Dublin Senior panel with a total score of 3–22 (2–0 pens, 0-13f, 0–4 '45'). He was on Dublin's winning side in the 2006 Leinster Senior football championship final clash against Offaly, helping Dublin gain their 46th championship. Quinn featured in the All-Ireland quarter-final victory over Westmeath, notching a first-half goal. He was substituted in the second half of the All-Ireland semi-final defeat to Mayo.

At club level, Mossy scored a total of 1–4 (0–3 '45', 0-1f) for St Vincent's in their drubbing of Parnells, taking St Vincent's to the fourth round of the 2006 Dublin Senior Football Championship. In the fourth round, St Vincent's met St Brigid's. Quinn's first half goal proved to be the difference between the sides in a game that finished with a scoreline of 1–8 to 0–9. Mossy scored a total of 1–2 in the game which took St Vincent's in the Dublin Senior Club Football Championship quarter-final, where they played St Judes. His form continued against St Judes in a tight game in which Mossy scored 2–2 to take his side into the Dublin Championship semi-final against Na Fianna. Quinn helped guide his team past Na Fianna and went on to lose against UCD in the final. He finished the Dublin Championship as top-scorer in this year's championship with 7–31 (eight games). Quinn was named on the 2006 Dublin Bus/Evening Herald Blue Star football XV at full forward.

=== 2007 ===
He won the 2007 O'Byrne Cup for Dublin against Laois at O'Connor Park in Offaly. The game finished on a scoreline of 1–18 to 2–13 against Laois. Mossy scored 1–11 (0-4f, 0–2 '45') for Dublin during their 2007 campaign in Division 1A. Mark Vaughan replaced Quinn as the freekick taker for the Dublin senior football team for Dublin's second game against Meath in the quarter-final of the Leinster Senior Football Championship. Vaughan scored 0-8 as the freetaker and was selected as the freetaker for the semi-final against Offaly. Quinn retained his position on the Dublin team, despite losing his role as freetaker. Quinn won his first Dublin Senior Football Championship medal with St Vincent's in 2007, scoring 0–4 in the final against St Brigid's at Parnell Park. Mossy then went on to win the Leinster Senior Club Football Championship final against Tyrrellspass of Westmeath.

=== 2008 ===
Tomás won the 2008 All-Ireland Senior Club Football Championship with St Vincent's as captain while scoring total of 0–7 (0-5f) in their final win over Nemo Rangers. Quinn was restored his free e-taking role with the Dublin senior team. He won his fourth Leinster title in a row with Dublin against Wexford in the final at Croke Park.
