= 1995 All-Ireland Minor Football Championship =

Championship details

All-Ireland Champions
- Winning team: Westmeath (1st win)
- Captain: Damien Gavin
- Manager: Luke Dempsey

All-Ireland Finalists
- Losing team: Derry

Provincial Champions
- Munster: Tipperary
- Leinster: Westmeath
- Ulster: Derry
- Connacht: Galway

The 1995 All-Ireland Minor Football Championship was the 64th staging of the All-Ireland Minor Football Championship, the Gaelic Athletic Association's premier inter-county Gaelic football tournament for boys under the age of 18.

Kerry entered the championship as defending champions, however, they were defeated by Cork in the Munster semi-final replay.

On 17 September 1995, Westmeath won the championship following a 1-10 to 0-11 defeat of Derry in the All-Ireland final. This was their first All-Ireland title.

== Results ==
=== Connacht Minor Football Championship ===
Quarter-Final

June 1995 Quarter-Final	Galway	1-16 - 2-8	Sligo	Tourlestrane

Semi-Finals

25 June 1995 Semi-Final	Mayo	2-13 - 2-7	Roscommon	McHale Park, Castlebar

2 July 1995 Semi-Final	Galway	2-16 - 0-7	Leitrim	Páirc Seán Mac Diarmada, Carrick-on-Shannon

Final

23 July 1995 Final	Galway	2-14 - 2-11	Mayo	St Jarlath's Park, Tuam

=== Leinster Minor Football Championship ===
Preliminary Round

May 1995 Preliminary Round	Kildare	0-17 - 1-5	Louth	St Conleth's Park, Newbridge

May 1995 Preliminary Round	Offaly	2-6 - 1-9	Meath	Páirc Tailteann, Navan

May 1995 Preliminary Round	Laois	5-25 - 0-3	Kilkenny	O'Moore Park, Portlaoise

May 1995 Preliminary Round Replay	Offaly	0-8 - 0-5	Meath	O'Connor Park, Tullamore

May 1995 Preliminary Round	Westmeath	0-15 - 0-6	Wexford	O'Moore Park, Portlaoise

Quarter-Finals

June 1995 Quarter-Final	Westmeath	0-15 - 0-6	Wicklow	Páirc Ciarán, Athlone

June 1995 Quarter-Final	Longford	2-6 - 0-5	Offaly	Pearse Park, Longford

June 1995 Quarter-Final	Laois	3-14 - 1-4	Carlow	O'Moore Park, Portlaoise

June 1995 Quarter-Final	Kildare	1-12 - 3-8	Dublin	O'Toole Park, Crumlin

Semi-Finals

July 1995 Semi-Final	Westmeath	1-11 - 2-7	Longford	O'Moore Park, Portlaoise

July 1995 Semi-Final	Kildare	0-15 - 2-9	Laois	Páirc Tailteann, Navan

July 1995 Semi-Final	Kildare	1-6 - 1-14	Laois	Dr Cullen Park, Carlow

Final

30 July 1995 Final	Westmeath	1-9 - 0-12	Laois	Croke Park, Dublin

6 August 1995 Final 1st Replay	Westmeath	3-12 - 2-15 (aet)	Laois	O'Connor Park, Tullamore

12 August 1995 Final 2nd Replay	Westmeath	1-10 - 0-9	Laois	O'Connor Park, Tullamore

=== Munster Minor Football Championship ===
Quarter-Finals

June 1995 Quarter-Final	Cork	4-20 - 1-3	Limerick	Mallow

June 1995 Quarter-Final	Clare	1-9 - 2-7	Waterford	Emly Sportsfield, Emly

Semi-Finals

25 June 1995 Semi-Final	Tipperary	1-6 - 0-9	Waterford	Fraher Field, Thurles

2 July 1995 Semi-Final Replay	Tipperary	1-9 - 0-8	Waterford	Fraher Field, Dungarvan

2 July 1995 Semi-Final	Kerry	0-7 - 0-12	Cork	Páirc Uí Chaoimh, Cork

Final

23 July 1995 Final	Tipperary	2-6 - 0-10	Cork	Fitzgerald Stadium, Killarney

=== Ulster Minor Football Championship ===
Preliminary Round

May 1995 Preliminary Round	Down	2-14 - 0-11	Donegal	St Tiernach's Park, Clones

Quarter-Finals

May 1995 Quarter-Final	Derry	1-12 - 0-14	Monaghan	Athletic Grounds, Armagh

June 1995 Quarter-Final	Down	2-11 - 1-13	Monaghan	Athletic Grounds, Armagh

June 1995 Quarter-Final	Fermanagh	2-13 - 2-10	Tyrone	St. Molaise Park, Irvinestown

June 1995 Quarter-Final	Cavan	3-8 - 2-9	Antrim	Breffni Park, Cavan

Semi-Finals

June 1995 Semi-Final	Derry	3-14 - 1-8	Tyrone	St Tiernach's Park, Clones

July 1995 Semi-Final	Down	4-12 - 0-11	Cavan	St Tiernach's Park, Clones

Final

23 July 1995 Final	Derry	2-12 - 1-7	Down	St Tiernach's Park, Clones

=== All-Ireland Minor Football Championship ===
Semi-Finals

13 August 1995 Semi-Final	Derry	3-7 - 1-12	Galway	Croke Park, Dublin

20 August 1995 Semi-Final	Westmeath	1-14 - 0-10	Tipperary	Croke Park, Dublin

Final

17 September 1995 Final	Westmeath	1-10 - 0-11	Derry	Croke Park, Dublin

== Championship statistics ==
=== Miscellaneous ===
- The All-Ireland final between Westmeath and Derry is the first ever championship meeting between the two teams.
