= Enon (robot) =

Personal assistant robot

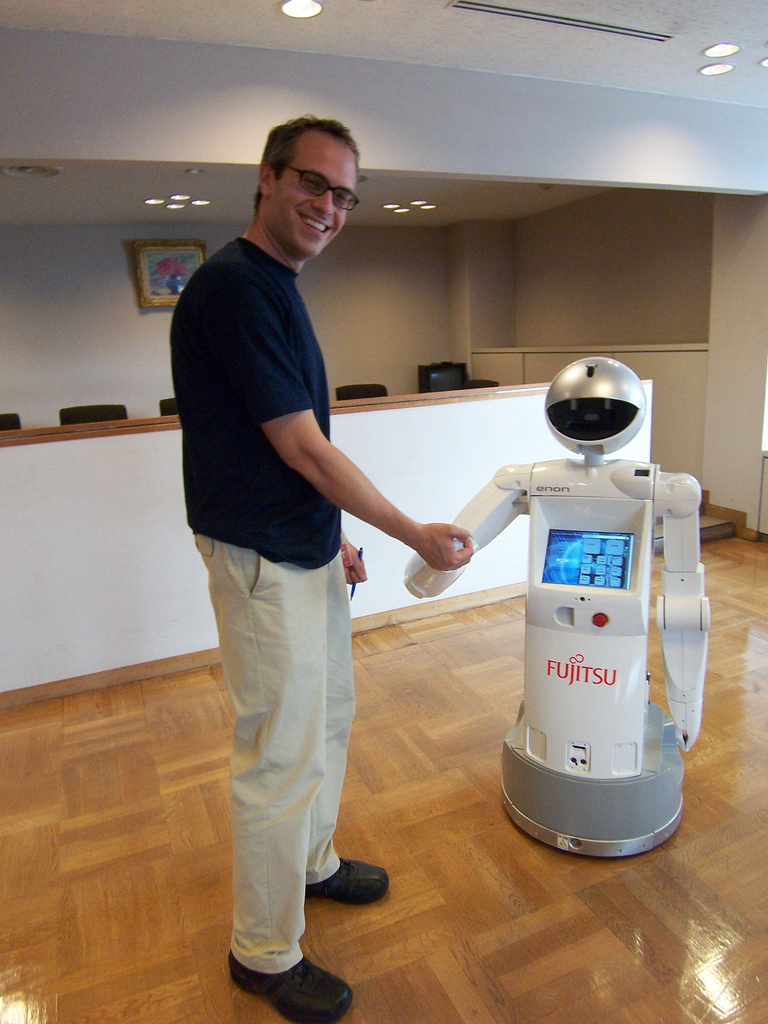
- Enon shaking a man's hand
- Manufacturer: Fujitsu Frontech Limited; Fujitsu Laboratories Ltd.
- Country: Japan
- Year of creation: 2005

Enon (stylised enon) is a service robot developed by Fujitsu Frontech Limited and Fujitsu Laboratories Ltd. It was first offered for sale in Japan in September 2005. The name is an acronym for "Exciting Nova On Network", reflecting the robot's ability to autonomously support tasks while connected to a network.

Enon was designed to assist with multiple tasks in offices and commercial establishments, including providing guidance, escorting guests, transporting objects, and security patrolling. This multi-function capability differentiated Enon from other service robots of the era that were designed for single tasks such as cleaning, transporting, or surveillance.

== Development ==
Development of Enon was motivated by Japan's anticipated labour shortage resulting from its declining birthrate and ageing population. Fujitsu Laboratories and Fujitsu Frontech collaborated to develop a practical service robot, completing a prototype in September 2004. The production model featured enhancements including lighter weight, smaller size, and additional safety features compared to the prototype, including improved arm mechanisms upgraded from four to five degrees of freedom.

Fujitsu developed several key technologies for Enon, including high-speed 3D vision processing hardware with low power consumption, and autonomous locomotion technology using three pairs of stereo cameras and SLAM technology. The robot also incorporated original middleware including a proprietary scripting language for state description during human-robot interaction.

The robot underwent safety appraisal by the NPO Safety Engineering Laboratory, an external third party, as Fujitsu prioritised safe operation in public spaces where the robot would coexist with humans.

== Technical specifications ==
Enon stands 1,300 mm (51 in) tall with a shoulder width of 560 mm (22 in) and weighs approximately 50 kg (110 lb). The robot moves on wheels at a maximum speed of 3 km/h (1.9 mph).

=== Sensors and perception ===
Enon is equipped with six cameras, three ultrasonic sensors, and three proximity sensors. Using its wide-angle head cameras, the robot can perceive people and objects in its surroundings while simultaneously determining their location. It navigates autonomously using pre-programmed maps without requiring special floor or wall markings.

Later versions incorporated face recognition software capable of detecting a person's gender and approximate age, enabling the robot to tailor its interactions accordingly.

=== Movement and manipulation ===
The robot features a swivel-head design allowing its head and arms to rotate independently of its direction of travel. When providing information, Enon faces users with its head and arms aligned with its chest-mounted display; when moving, its head can swivel to face forward.

Each arm has five degrees of freedom, with one degree of freedom per hand, allowing Enon to grasp and pass objects weighing up to 0.5 kg (1.1 lb). The robot can also carry loads of up to 10 kg (22 lb) in an internal storage compartment in its torso for delivery to designated locations.

=== Communication ===
Enon features speech recognition and speech synthesis in Japanese, and has a 10.5 in (27 cm) LCD touchscreen on its chest for visual communication. LEDs on its face enable various facial expressions, with additional LEDs on the back of its head to display operational status to people behind it. The robot connects to networks via wireless LAN (802.11a/b/g), enabling it to retrieve information from servers and transmit images.

== Sales and deployment ==
Enon was announced on 13 September 2005 at a price of six million yen (approximately US$54,000–60,000), with software programmes costing extra. The robot was available in three colours: Citrus Yellow, Lily White, and Lavender Blue. Fujitsu initially planned to sell 20–30 units and had received 10 orders by the announcement date. Deliveries to select customers began in November 2005.

Fujitsu projected that the worldwide service robot market would grow to 100 billion yen (approximately US$900 million) by 2010, and hoped to make Enon a mass-produced product with a reduced price of around 2 million yen (US$18,000).

Enon was presented at the 23rd Annual Conference of the Robotics Society of Japan at Keio University in September 2005 and exhibited at the 2005 International Robot Exhibition at Tokyo Big Sight in November 2005. It was also exhibited at CEATEC in October 2008 and the International Robot Exhibition in 2009.

=== Notable deployments ===
In September 2007, Enon was installed as a permanent visitor guide at the Kyotaro Nishimura Museum in Yugawara, Japan, marking the first permanent museum deployment of the robot. At the museum, which features exhibits related to the Japanese mystery novelist, Enon autonomously moved to the entrance to greet visitors, provided commentary on exhibits using voice and gestures along with its LCD screen, played video greetings from the novelist, and administered interactive quizzes about the author.

In January 2010, an Enon unit was tested in a shopping mall in Osaka, where it interacted with customers throughout a Saturday. Using its face recognition capabilities to detect customers' gender and approximate age, the robot directed shoppers to different stores with tailored recommendations, such as suggesting seafood restaurants to some customers and bars to others.

Enon was also deployed in data centers for transport services and at various commercial establishments for sales promotion and product search guidance.

== Reception ==
At the 2005 press demonstration, Enon greeted reporters in a female voice saying "Hello. Welcome to Fujitsu. I'm enon. Are you a reporter?" before guiding them to a room, though it failed to notice a basket of pamphlets it was supposed to collect. In another demonstration where it attempted to place a box on a table, it knocked over the table twice.

Fujitsu Frontech director Tokuichi Shishido stated at the launch: "We hope that robots like this will be able to help people in an aging society where the population is declining."

== See also ==
- ASIMO
- HOAP
- Pepper (robot)
- Service robot
