= Colin Holmes (Gaelic footballer) =

Irish Gaelic footballer (born 1976)

Personal information
- Nickname: Collie
- Born: May 12, 1976 (age 50) Northern Ireland
- Occupation: Teacher
- Height: 6 ft 2 in (188 cm)

Sport
- Sport: Gaelic football
- Position: Midfield, Half-back, Full-back
Club
- Years: Club
- Armagh Harps
Inter-county
- Years: County
- 1996-2009: Tyrone
Inter-county titles
- Ulster titles: 5
- All-Irelands: 3
- NFL: 2

Colin Holmes is an Irish former Gaelic footballer who played for the Tyrone county team. He was on the Tyrone panel for their first-ever All-Ireland Senior Football Championship win in 2003 and repeated the feat in 2005, appearing as a substitute in both finals. He also starred in midfield in the 2008 final, starting the move that ended in Brian Dooher's now infamous point.

== Playing career ==
=== Club ===
Although he played for Tyrone, Holmes played most of his club football for Armagh Harps where he was club captain.

=== Inter-county ===
Holmes was a long-standing member of the Tyrone panel, and his versatility meant he was an important member of the panel although his career was often blighted by injury. He won honours with the county at youth and senior level, including the 1993 Ulster Minor Championship as well as four Ulster Senior Championship medals and three All-Ireland Championship medals.
