= 2004 All-Ireland Senior Football Championship =

Football championship

Championship details
- Dates: 2 May – 26 September 2004
- Teams: 33

All-Ireland Champions
- Winning team: Kerry (33rd win)
- Captain: Dara Ó Cinnéide
- Manager: Jack O'Connor

All-Ireland Finalists
- Losing team: Mayo
- Captain: Gary Ruane
- Manager: John Maughan

Provincial Champions
- Munster: Kerry
- Leinster: Westmeath
- Ulster: Armagh
- Connacht: Mayo

Championship statistics
- No. matches played: 66
- Goals total: 122 (1.85 per game)
- Points total: 1584 (24 per game)
- Top Scorer: Mattie Forde (3–38)
- Player of the Year: Tomás Ó Sé; Colm Cooper

The 2004 All-Ireland Senior Football Championship, known for sponsorship reasons as the 2004 Bank of Ireland All-Ireland Senior Football Championship was the premier Gaelic football competition in 2004. It consisted of 33 teams and began on Sunday 2 May 2004. The championship concluded on Sunday 26 September 2004, when Mayo were defeated by Kerry by 1–20 to 2–9.

== Format ==
Since the introduction of the so-called "back-door" system, a number of changes have taken place in the championship format. In 2004 the following system was used:

The provincial championships in Munster, Leinster, Ulster and Connacht ran as usual on a "knock-out" basis. These provincial games were then followed by the "Qualifier" system:

- Round 1 of the qualifiers included all the counties (except New York) that do not qualify for the Provincial Semifinals. An open draw was made to give eight pairings.
- Round 2 consisted of the eight defeated teams in the Provincial Semifinals playing against the eight winners from Round 1. A draw was made to determine the eight pairings.
- Round 3 consisted of the eight winners from Round 2. Another open draw was made to determine the four pairings.
- Round 4 consisted of each of the four teams defeated in the Provincial Finals playing against the four winners from Round 3. A draw was made to determine the four pairings.

The All-Ireland Quarterfinals: Each of the four Provincial Champions played one of the four winners from Round 4. The All-Ireland Semifinals were on a Provincial rota basis, initially determined by the Central Council. If a Provincial Championship winning was defeated in its Quarterfinal, the team that defeated it would take its place in the semifinal.

== Provincial championships ==
=== Munster Senior Football Championship ===
Quarter-finals
Limerick	0–16
Tipperary	3–05
Clare	0–09
Kerry	2–10

Semi-finals
Limerick	1–18
Waterford	0–07
Cork	0–07
Kerry	0–15

Final
Limerick	2–09
Kerry	3–10

Quarter-finals

16 May 2004 Quarter-final	Tipperary	3–05 – 0–16	Limerick	Páirc Uí Chaoimh, Cork
	D Browne 1–4, P Cahill 1–0, A Fitzgerald 1–0, G Burke 0–1.		M Gavin 0–7, E Keating 0–4, C Fitzgerald 0–2, J Murphy 0–1, S Kelly 0–1, C Mullane 0–1.	Referee: M Deegan (Laois)

23 May 2004 Quarter-final	Clare	0–09 – 2–10	Kerry	Cusack Park, Ennis
	Denis Russell 0–3, C Mullen 0–2, O O’Dwyer 0–1, David Russell 0–1, M O’Dwyer 0–1, E Talty 0–1.		E Brosnan 1–4, MF Russell 0–5, J Crowley 1–0, C Cooper 0–1.	Referee: G Kinneavy (Roscommon)

Semi-finals

13 June 2004 Semi-final	Limerick	1–18 – 0–07	Waterford	Gaelic Grounds, Limerick
	M Gavin (0–9, six fres), C Mullane (1–0), C Fitzgerald (0–4), M Reidy (0–2), D Reidy (0–1); O Keating (0–1), J Murphy (0–1).		S Walsh (0–4, three frees), G Power (0–2), M Aherne (0–1).	Referee: T Quigley (Wexford)

13 June 2004 Semi-final	Kerry	0–15 – 0–07	Cork	Fitzgerald Stadium, Killarney
	MF Russell 0–7, C Cooper 0–3, W Kirby 0–2, T Ó Sé 0–1, E Brosnan 0–1, D Ó Cinnéide 0–1.		M Ó Cróinín 0–3, A Cronin 0–1, C McCarthy 0–1, M O’Sullivan 0–1, K McMahon 0–1.	Referee: B White (Wexford)

Final

11 July 2004 Final	Limerick	1–10 – 1–10	Kerry	Gaelic Grounds, Limerick
	M Gavin 0–4, S Lavin 1–0, C Fitzgerald 0–2, E Keating 0–2, J Stokes 0–1, C Mullane 0–1.	Report	MF Russell 1–4, D Ó Cinnéide 0–3, C Cooper 0–2, E Brosnan 0–1.	Attendance: 23,214; Referee: E Kinneavy (Roscommon)

18 July 2004 Final replay	Kerry	3–10 – 2–09	Limerick	Fitzgerald Stadium, Killarney
	D Ó Cinnéide 1–7, E Brosnan 1–1, T Ó Sé 1–0, P Galvin 0–1, MF Russell 0–1.	Report	E Keating 1–1, M Galvin 0–4, S Kelly 1–0, J Galvin 0–2, C Fitzgerald 0–2.	Attendance: 29,379; Referee: M Curley (Galway)

=== Leinster Senior Football Championship ===
1st round
Louth	0–08
Wexford	2–10
Westmeath	0–11
Offaly	0–10
Carlow	4–15
Longford	1–16

Quarter-finals
Wexford	0–12
Kildare	0–10
Westmeath	0–14
Dublin	0–12
Carlow	1–07
Laois	0–15
Wicklow	1–08
Meath	2–13

Semi-finals
Wexford	1–14
Westmeath	2–15
Laois	1–13
Meath	0–09

Final
Westmeath	0–12
Laois	0–10

First round

9 May 2004 First round	Carlow	4–15 – 1–16	Longford	O'Connor Park, Tullamore
	S Rea 2–3, (1–0 pen, 3f); M Carpenter, P Hickey (0-1f) 1–1 each; S Kavanagh 0–3; J Nevin 0–2; J Hayden, J Byrne, T Walsh, B Carbery, B Kelly 0–1 each.		P Davis 1–6 (0-3f, 1 line ball); P Barden 0–4, N Sheridan 0–3, L Keenan, T Smullen, J Martin (f) 0–1 each.	Referee: T Quigley (Wexford)

16 May 2004 First round	Wexford	2–10 – 0–08	Louth	Parnell Park, Dublin
	M Forde 0–8, J Hegarty 1–0, D Foran 1–0, G Sunderland 0–1; P Colfer 0–1.		O McDonnell 0–3, P Keenan 0–2; D Clarke 0–1, P Matthews 0–1, M Stanfield 0–1.	Referee: M Hughes (Tyrone)

23 May 2004 First round	Offaly	0–10 – 0–11	Westmeath	Croke Park, Dublin
	J Coughlan 0–3, P Kellaghan 0–2, K Slattery 0–1, C McManus 0–1, J Grennan 0–1, N Coughlan 0–1, T Deehan 0–1.		D Dolan 0–5, B Morley 0–2, M Ennis 0–1, F Wilson 0–1, D Glennon 0–1, JP Casey 0–1.	Attendance: 32,563; Referee: P Russell (Tipperary)

Quarter-finals

23 May 2004 Quarter-final	Wicklow	1–08 – 2–13	Meath	Croke Park, Dublin
	T Gill 0–4, D McGillicuddy 1–0, B Ó hAnnaidh 0–1, A Ellis 0–1, T Hannon 0–1, W O’Gorman 0–1.		D Regan 1–5, D Curtis 1–0, C McCarthy 0–2, T Giles 0–2, E Kelly 0–2, S McKeigue 0–1, S Mac Gabhann 0–1.	Referee: J McKee (Armagh)

30 May 2004 Quarter-final	Carlow	1–07 – 0–15	Laois	Dr. Cullen Park, Carlow
	B Kelly 1–3, S Rea 0–2, M Carpenter 0–1, S Kavanagh 0–1.		R Munnelly 0–4, B McDonald 0–3, M Lawlor 0–2, C Conway 0–2, C Parkinson 0–1, D Rooney 0–1, K Fitzpatrick 0–1, P Clancy 0–1.	Referee: M Ryan (Limerick)

6 June 2004 Quarter-final	Wexford	0–12 – 0–10	Kildare	Croke Park, Dublin
	M Forde (0–7, five frees), P Forde (0–2), W Carley (0–1); D Breen (0–1), J Lawlor (0–1).		J Doyle (0–2, two frees), P Brennan (0–2, one free), M Sullivan (0–2), K Ennis (0–1); D McCormack (0–1), P Hurley (0–1), T Fennin (0–1).	Referee: M Collins (Cork)

6 June 2004 Quarter-final	Westmeath	0–14 – 0–12	Dublin	Croke Park, Dublin
	D Dolan (0–4, two frees), D Glennon (0–2), P Conway (0–2), A Mangan (0–2); B Morley (0–1), G Dolan (0–1), D Mitchell (0–1), J Fallon (0–1).		J Sherlock (0–4), S Connell (0–3, two frees), A Brogan (0–3), B Cullen (0–1), C Moran (0–1).	Referee: M Collins (Cork)

Semi-finals

20 June 2004 Semi-final	Meath	0–09 – 1–13	Laois	Croke Park, Dublin
	J Sheridan 0–6, D Regan 0–2, T Giles 0–1.		R Munnelly 0–6, C Parkinson 1–2, B McDonald 0–2, P Clancy 0–1, C Conway 0–1, M Lawlor 0–1.	Referee: P McEnaney (Monaghan)

27 June 2004 Semi-final	Wexford	1–14 – 2–15	Westmeath	Croke Park, Dublin
	M Forde (0–8), J Lawlor (1–1), J Hegarty (0–2), P Forde (0–2), D Fogarty (0–1).		P Dolan (1–7), S Colleary (1–0), B Morley (0–2), A Mangan (0–2), D Glennon (0–2), D Heavin (0–1), M Ennis (0–1).	Referee: J White (Donegal)

Final

18 July 2004 Final	Laois	0–13 – 0–13	Westmeath	Croke Park, Dublin
	C Conway 0–3, B McDonald 0–3, S Cooke 0–2, R Munnelly 0–2, M Lawlor 0–1, K Fitzpatrick 0–1, D Rooney 0–1.		D Glennon 0–5, D Dolan 0–4, F Wilson 0–2, J Fallon 0–2.	Referee: P McEnaney (Monaghan)

24 July 2004 Final replay	Laois	0–10 – 0–12	Westmeath	Croke Park, Dublin
	R Munnelly 0–3, K Fitzpatrick 0–2; P Clancy 0–1, T Kelly 0–1, B McDonald 0–1, D Brennan 0–1, C Parkinson 0–1.		A Mangan 0–4, D Dolan 0–3, D Glennon 0–2, M Ennis 0–1, B Morley 0–1, F Wilson 0–1.	Referee: M Monahan (Kildare)

=== Ulster Senior Football Championship ===
Preliminary round
Derry	1–06
Tyrone	1–17

Quarter-finals
Down	2–12
Cavan	3–13
Monaghan	0–10
Armagh	2–19
Antrim	1–09
Donegal	1–15
Tyrone	1–13
Fermanagh	0–12

Semi-finals
Cavan	0–11
Armagh	0–13
Donegal	1–11
Tyrone	0–09

Final
Armagh	3–15
Donegal	0–11

Preliminary round

9 May 2004 Preliminary round	Tyrone	1–17 – 1–06	Derry	Healy Park, Omagh
	K Hughes 1–2, S Cavanagh 0–4, M Harte 0–4, B Dooher 0–2, C McCullough 0–2, P Jordan 0–1, E McGinley 0–1, S O’Neill 0–1.		Paddy Bradley 0–4, P Kelly 1–0, F McEldowney 0–1, E. Muldoon 0–1.	Referee: B White (Wexford)

Quarter-finals

16 May 2004 Quarter-final	Down	1–13 – 1–13	Cavan	Casement Park, Belfast
	B Coulter 1–2, D Hughes 0–4, L Doyle 0–4, R Sexton 0–1; J Clarke 0–1, A O’Prey 0–1.		J Reilly 1–2, M Lyng 0–6, G Pierson 0–3, L Reilly 0–1, S Johnston 0–1.	Referee: D Coldrick (Meath)

23 May 2004 Quarter-final	Armagh	2–19 – 0–10	Monaghan	St. Tiernach's Park, Clones
	S McDonnell 1–5, R Clarke 1–2, O McConville 0–5, P McKeever 0–4, T McEntee 0–1, M O’Rourke 0–1, B Mallon 0–1		P Finlay 0–4, D Clerkin 0–2, R Woods 0–2, D Freeman 0–2.	Referee: J Bannon (Longford)

30 May 2004 Quarter-final replay	Cavan	3–13 – 2–12	Down	Breffni Park, Cavan
	J O’Reilly 1–3, M Lyng 0–5, P Reilly 1–0, D McCabe 1–0, M McKeever 0–3, P McKenna 0–1, T Crowe 0–1.		B Coulter 2–2, A O’Prey 0–3, G McCartan 0–3, D Hughes 0–2, D Gordon 0–1, R Murtagh 0–1.	Referee: S McCormack (Meath)

30 May 2004 Quarter-final	Donegal	1–15 – 1–09	Antrim	MacCumhaill Park, Ballybofey
	A Sweeney 0–5, B Boyle 1–0, B Devenney 0–3, C McFadden 0–3, M Hegarty 0–3, C Toye 0–1.		K Madden 0–6, D O’Hare 1–1, K McGourty 0–1, J Marron 0–1.	Referee: P Fox (Westmeath)

6 June 2004 Quarter-final	Tyrone	1–13 – 0–12	Fermanagh	St. Tiernach's Park, Clones
	M Harte (1–2, one pen, one free), O Mulligan (0–5, three frees), K Hughes (0–2), B McGuigan (0–1), S O'Neill (0–1); C Gourley (0–1); Sean Cavanagh (0–1).		S Maguire (0–5, five frees), J Sherry (0–2), M McGrath (0–2), M Little (0–1); E Maguire (0–1), D Kelly (0–1).	Referee: S McCormack (Meath)

Semi-finals

13 June 2004 Semi-final	Cavan	0–11 – 0–13	Armagh	St. Tiernach's Park, Clones
	O McConville 0–5, S McDonnell 0–2, B Mallon 0–2, R Clarke 0–1, P McKeever 0–1, K McElvanna 0–1, D Marsden 0–1.		M Lyng 0–4, G Pierson 0–3, L Reilly 0–3, D McCabe 0–1.	Referee: M Monahan (Kildare)

20 June 2004 Semi-final	Donegal	1–11 – 0–09	Tyrone	St Tiernach's Park, Clones
	C McFadden 1–7, B Roper 0–1, B Monaghan 0–1, C Toye 0–1, A Sweeney 0–1.		O Mulligan 0–4, S O'Neill 0–2, M Harte 0–1, J McMahon 0–1, S Sweeney 0–1.	Referee: G Kinneavy (Roscommon)

Final

11 July 2004 Final	Armagh	3–15 – 0–11	Donegal	Croke Park, Dublin
	O McConville 1–3, P McKeever 1–3, D Marsden 1–2, T McEntee 0–2, S McDonnell 0–2, P Loughran 0–1, R Clarke 0–1, B Mallon 0–1.		C McFadden 0–3, A Sweeney 0–2, B Devenney 0–2, M Hegarty 0–1, B Roper 0–1, J Gildea 0–1, R Kavanagh 0–1.	Referee: M Collins (Cork)

=== Connacht Senior Football Championship ===
Quarter-finals
London	0–08
Galway	8–14
New York	1–08
Mayo	3–28
Sligo	1–15
Roscommon	2–16

Semi-finals
Galway	1–09
Mayo	0–18
Leitrim	0–05
Roscommon	1–09

Final
Mayo	2–13
Roscommon	0–09

Quarter-finals

2 May 2004 Quarter-final	New York	1–08 – 3–28	Mayo	Gaelic Park, New York City
	K O'Connor (1–1), J Killeen (0–3), E Bradley (0–2), K Lilly (0–2).		C Mortimer (1–12, six frees), A O'Malley (1–3), A Moran (0–5), M Moyles (1–1), M McNicholas (0–2), J Gill (0–2), A Dillon (0–1), B Maloney (0–1), F Costello (0–1).	Attendance: 5,000; Referee: M Collins (Cork)

23 May 2004 Quarter-final	Roscommon	1–10 – 0–13	Sligo	Dr. Hyde Park, Roscommon
	F Dolan 0–6, K Mannion 1–2, N Dinneen 0–1, S O’Neill 0–1.		D Sloyan 0–5, G McGowan 0–3, S Davey 0–2, M Brehony 0–2, M McNamara 0–1.	Referee: J McQuillan (Cavan)

29 May 2004 Quarter-final replay	Sligo	1–15 – 2–16 (aet)	Roscommon	Markievicz Park, Sligo
	P Taylor 1–4, D Sloyan 0–4, S Davey 0–3; M Breheny 0–2, M McNamara 0–1, J Davey 0–1.		S Curran 1–1; G Henegan 1–1, F Dolan 0–3, F Grehan 0–2, S O'Neill 0–2, K Mannion 0–2, G Cox 0–1, P Noone 0–1, J Dunning 0–1, A McPadden 0–1, J Tiernan 0–1.	Referee: A Mangan (Kerry)

30 May 2004 Quarter-final	London	0–08 – 8–14	Galway	Emerald GAA Grounds, Ruislip
	S Doran 0–3, F McMahon 0–2, G Kane 0–1, D Kineavey 0–1, G Weldon 0–1.		P Joyce 2–3, M Donnellan 2–1, J Bergin 2–1, T Joyce 1–0, M Meehan 1–0, J Devane 0–3, N Joyce 0–3, S Óg de Paor 0–1, S Ó Domhnaill 0–1, M Clancy 0–1.	Referee: J White (Donegal)

Semi-finals

20 June 2004 Semi-final	Leitrim	1–10 – 0–13	Roscommon	Páirc Seán Mac Diarmada, Carrick-on-Shannon
	M Foley 1–1, C Regan 0–2, J McKeon 0–1, B Prior 0–1, D Maxwell 0–1, J Goldrick 0–1, F McBrien 0–1, S Canning 0–1, P Farrell 0–1.		F Dolan 0–6, S O'Neill 0–3, F Grehan 0–2, S Lohan 0–1, G Cox 0–1.	Referee: M Hughes (Tyrone)

26 June 2004 Semi-final	Roscommon	1–09 – 0–05	Leitrim	Dr. Hyde Park, Roscommon
	J Hanly (1–1), F Dolan (0–3), J Tiernan (0–2), G Cox (0–2), J Dunning (0–1).		M Foley (0–2), F McBrien (0–1), J Goldrick (0–1), J Guckian (0–1).	Referee: S Geaney (Cork)

27 June 2004 Semi-final	Mayo	0–18 – 1–09	Galway	McHale Park, Castlebar
	C Mortimer 0–8, K McDonald 0–3, B Maloney 0–2, J Gill 0–2; R McGarrity 0–1, D Heaney 0–1, T Mortimer 0–1.		P Joyce 0–5, M Meehan 1–1, M Donnellan 0–3.	Referee: D Coldrick (Meath)

Final

18 July 2004 Final	Mayo	2–13 – 0–09	Roscommon	McHale Park, Castlebar
	C Mortimer 0–9, T Mortimer 1–1, A O’Malley 1–0, K McDonald 0–1, C Moran 0–1, A Dillon 0–1.		G Heneghan 0–5, N Dineen 0–1, S Lohan 0–1, J Hanly 0–1, F Dolan 0–1.	Attendance: 34,790; Referee: B White (Wexford)

== Qualifiers ==
=== Round 1 ===
The losers of the preliminary-round matches and quarter final matches of each provincial championship started the qualifier.

12 June 2004 Round 1	Kildare	1–16 – 2–17	Offaly	St. Conleth's Park, Newbridge
				Attendance: 10,000; Referee: J McQuillan (Cavan)

12 June 2004 Round 1	Monaghan	1–16 – 4–15	Longford	St. Tiernach's Park, Clones
		Report

12 June 2004 Round 1	Clare	1–15 – 1–07	Sligo	Cusack Park, Ennis
		Report

12 June 2004 Round 1	Carlow	1–13 – 1–19	Down	Dr. Cullen Park, Carlow
		Report

12 June 2004 Round 1	Wicklow	1–10 – 1–15	Derry	Aughrim Park, Aughrim
		Report

12 June 2004 Round 1	Louth	2–13 – 0–14	Antrim	Drogheda Park, Drogheda
		Report

12 June 2004 Round 1	Dublin	3–24 – 0–06	London	Parnell Park, Dublin
		Report

12 June 2004 Round 1	Tipperary	Not played	Fermanagh	Semple Stadium, Thurles

Tipperary withdrew from the competition following the resignation of their manager, Andy Shorthall, giving Fermanagh a walkover into Round 2.

=== Round 2 ===
The winners of round 1 were joined by the semi-final losers of each provincial championship. The matches would be between a round 2 winner and a provincial championship semi final loser.

3 July 2004 Round 2	Galway	2–08 – 0–09	Louth	Parnell Park, Dublin
		Report

3 July 2004 Round 2	Longford	1–14 – 1–05	Waterford	Pearse Park, Longford
		Report

3 July 2004 Round 2	Clare	0–11 – 0–15	Cork	Cusack Park, Ennis
		Report

3 July 2004 Round 2	Leitrim	1–04 – 0–13	Dublin	Páirc Seán Mac Diarmada, Carrick-on-Shannon
		Report

3 July 2004 Round 2	Down	0–10 – 1–15	Tyrone	Páirc Esler, Newry
		Report

3 July 2004 Round 2	Fermanagh	0–19 – 2–12	Meath	Brewster Park, Enniskillen

4 July 2004 Round 2	Derry	0–25 – 2–09	Cavan	Celtic Park, Derry
		Report

10 July 2004 Round 2	Wexford	2–14 – 0–15	Offaly	Wexford Park, Wexford
		Report		Attendance: 9500; Referee: A. Mangan (Kerry)

=== Round 3 ===
The winners of round 2 contest as the matches from here were lowered to four. Matches were open.

10 July 2004 Round 3	Dublin	1–17 – 0–11	Longford	O'Moore Park, Portlaoise
		Report

17 July 2004 Round 3	Fermanagh	0–18 – 0–11	Cork	Croke Park, Dublin
		Report

17 July 2004 Round 3	Tyrone	1–16 – 0–11	Galway	Croke Park, Dublin
		Report

17 July 2004 Round 3	Derry	2–16 – 2–05	Wexford	Parnell Park, Dublin
		Report

=== Round 4 ===
The winners of round 3 were joined by the losers of each provincial championship final. The matches would be between a round 3 winner and the loser of a provincial championship final.

24 July 2004 Round 4	Derry	0–10 – 0–07	Limerick	Dr. Hyde Park, Roscommon
		Report

24 July 2004 Round 4	Fermanagh	1–10 – 0–12	Donegal	St. Tiernach's Park, Clones
		Report

1 August 2004 Round 4	Dublin	1–14 – 0–13	Roscommon	Croke Park, Dublin
		Report

1 August 2004 Round 4	Tyrone	3–15 – 2–04	Laois	Croke Park, Dublin
		Report

== All-Ireland Senior Football Championship ==
The provincial champions and the winners of round 4 contested the quarter-finals. The quarter final matches would be between a provincial champion and a round 4 winner.

Quarter-finals
Fermanagh	0–12
Armagh	0–11
Mayo	0–16
Tyrone	1–09
Derry	2–09
Westmeath	0–13
Kerry	1–15
Dublin	1–08

Semi-finals
Fermanagh (R)	0–09; 1-08
Mayo (R)	0–09; 0–13
Derry	1–11
Kerry	1–17

Final
Mayo	2–09
Kerry	1–20

Quarter-finals

7 August 2004 Quarter-final	Fermanagh	0–12 – 0–11	Armagh	Croke Park, Dublin
	S Maguire 0–5, T Brewster 0–3, C Bradley 0–2, E Maguire 0–1, J Sherry 0–1.		S McDonnell 0–7, K McGeeney 0–1, P McKeever 0–1, D Marsden 0–1, O McConville 0–1.	Referee: J Bannon (Longford)

7 August 2004 Quarter-final	Mayo	0–16 – 1–09	Tyrone	Croke Park, Dublin
	A Dillon 0–6, D Brady 0–3, C Mortimer 0–3, T Mortimer 0–2, R McGarrity 0–1, K McDonald 0–1.		S O’Neill 1–3, O Mulligan 0–3, M Harte 0–1, G Cavlan 0–1, P Canavan 0–1.	Referee: P Russell (Tipperary)

14 August 2004 Quarter-final	Derry	2–09 – 0–13	Westmeath	Croke Park, Dublin
	E. Muldoon (1–6, 4 frees), Paddy Bradley (1–2, 1 free), E Burke (0–1).		D Dolan (0–5, 3 frees, 1 ’45), J Fallon (0–2, 2 frees), F Wilson (0–2, 2 frees), D Glennon (0–2), A Mangan (0–1), G Dolan (0–1).	Referee: M Curley (Galway)

14 August 2004 Quarter-final	Kerry	1–15 – 1–08	Dublin	Croke Park, Dublin
	D Ó Cinnéide (1–5, 3 frees), C Cooper (0–5, 1 free), W Kirby (0–2), D O'Sullivan (0–1), P Galvin (0–1), L Hassett (0–1).		S Connell (0–5, 5 frees), J Sherlock (1–0), D Homan (0–2), C Keaney (0–1, free).	Referee: P McEnaney (Monaghan)

Semi-finals

22 August 2004 Semi-final	Mayo	0–09 – 0–09	Fermanagh	Croke Park, Dublin
	C Mortimer (0–4), A Dillon (0–2); K McDonald (0–1), D Heaney (0–1), T Mortimer (0–1).		C Bradley (0–3), T Brewster (0–1), J Sherry (0–1), L McBarron (0–1); E Maguire (0–1), S Maguire (0–1), M Little (0–1).	Referee: M Collins (Cork)

28 August 2004 Semi-final replay	Mayo	0–13 – 1–08	Fermanagh	Croke Park, Dublin
	C Mortimer (0–5), T Mortimer (0–3), K McDonald (0–2), R McGarrity (0–1), A O'Malley (0–1), D Brady (0–1).		J Sherry (1–1), C Bradley (0–3), S Maguire (0–2), M Little (0–1); T Brewster (0–1).	Referee: J Bannon (Longford)

29 August 2004 Semi-final	Derry	1–11 – 1–17	Kerry	Croke Park, Dublin
	Paddy Bradley (0–6), E. Muldoon (1–1), C Gilligan (0–2), F Doherty (0–1), P McFlynn (0–1).		C Cooper (0–6), D O'Sullivan (1–0), D O Cinneide (0–2), MF Russell (0–2), T Ó Sé (0–2), E Brosnan (0–1), P Galvin (0–1); D Ó Sé (0–1), P Kelly (0–1), W Kirby (0–1).

Final

26 September 2004 Final	Kerry	1–20 – 2–09	Mayo	Croke Park, Dublin
	C Cooper (1–5), D Ó Cinnéide (0–8), W Kirby (0–3); P Galvin (0–1); D O'Sullivan (0–1), M Ó Sé (0–1), MF Russell (0–1).		A Dillon (1–2), M Conroy (1–1), K McDonald (0–4), C Mortimer (0–1), B Maloney (0–1).	Attendance: 79,749; Referee: P McEnaney (Monaghan)

== Championship statistics ==
=== Miscellaneous ===
- Carlow defeat Longford in the Leinster Championship for the first time since 1977.
- Limerick and Waterford meet in the Munster Championship for the first time since 1991.
- The Ulster final was moved from St Tiernach's Park, Clones to Croke Park, Dublin the venue hosted before in the 1939 replay.
- Westmeath win the Leinster Championship for the very first time in their history.
- Fermanagh reach the All Ireland semi finals for the first time.

=== Top scorers ===
Player	County	Scores	Total
Mattie Forde	Wexford	3–38	47
Conor Mortimer	Mayo	1–42	45
Paddy Bradley	Derry	2–38	44
Padraic Davis	Longford	2–28	34
Enda Muldoon	Derry	3–24	33
Dara Ó Cinnéide	Kerry	2–25	31
Dessie Dolan	Westmeath	1–27	30
Mark Harte	Tyrone	3–18	27
Stephan Maguire	Fermanagh	0–27	27
