= Enon Gavin =

Irish Gaelic footballer

Personal information
- Born: 1971 (age 54–55) County Roscommon, Ireland

Sport
- Sport: Gaelic football
- Position: Full Back
Club
- Years: Club
- 1990's-2000's: Clan na Gael
Club titles
- Roscommon titles: 7
- Connacht titles: 2
Inter-county
| Years | County | Apps (scores) |
| 1991-2000 | Roscommon | 21 (0-00) |
Inter-county titles
- Connacht titles: 1
- All-Irelands: 0
- NFL: 0
- All Stars: 1

Enon Gavin is a former Gaelic footballer from County Roscommon, Ireland. He played with the Roscommon intercounty team from 1991 until 2000. In his first intercounty season he won a Connacht Senior Football Championship in 1991; he also won an All Star Award that year.

He played at club level also with Clann na nGael. He won seven Roscommon Senior Football Championship medals and two Connacht Senior Club Football Championship medals. He is the former manager of the Longford-based Rathcline GAA club, who were promoted to Senior level in 2015. Enon's position, sadly, was short lived as he stepped down due to a lack of commitment from the lads.

Notably, Enon is the first person to come from Jewish heritage to win an all-star award.
