= MacHale Park =

Gaelic football stadium

- Páirc Mhic Éil
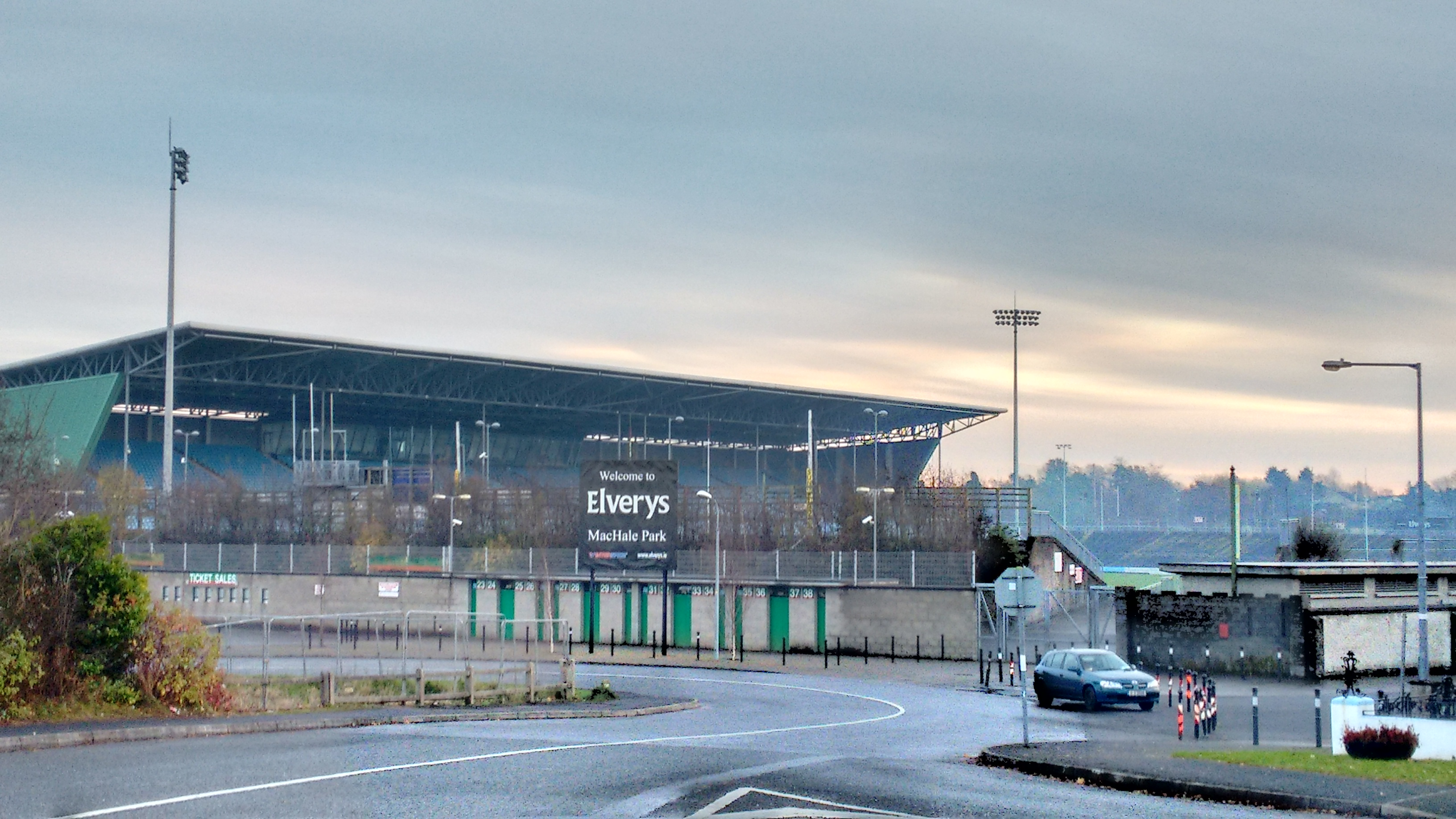
- MacHale Park, November 2016
- Interactive map of MacHale Park
- Location: Castlebar, County Mayo, F23 AC90, Ireland
- Coordinates: 53°51′14″N 9°17′4″W
- Owner: Castlebar Mitchels
- Capacity: 31,000 (pre-2019); 25,369 (2019); 27,870 (2025)
- Field size: 137×82 m
- Public transit: Castlebar railway station Stephen Garvey Way bus stop (Bus Éireann routes 52, 440)

Construction
- Opened: 1931
- Renovated: 1950–1952; 2008
- Cost: IR£1,700 (1930)

MacHale Park (/məˈkeɪl/) is a GAA stadium in Castlebar, County Mayo, Ireland. It is the home of the Castlebar Mitchels GAA and Mayo GAA Gaelic football teams. Built in 1931, the ground currently has a capacity of 28,000 and is named after John MacHale, Catholic Archbishop of Tuam from 1831 to 1881. It is the eighth-biggest sports stadium in the Republic of Ireland by capacity and the largest in the province of Connacht.

== History ==
Discussions with the owners of the land where MacHale Park now stands commenced in 1929 and the deal was concluded on 7 March 1930. In early 1931, development of the pitch took place at a cost of IR£1,700. The first competitive matches took place in MacHale Park on 22 March 1931 when Castlebar Mitchels minors played Balla and Ballina and Cloonacastle played a junior championship match. The first inter-county match was a National Football League match between Mayo and Sligo on 19 April 1931, Mayo winning by 0–7 to 0–2. The official opening took place on 24 May 1931, when about 4,000 spectators attended a match between Mayo and Kildare, which ended in a draw.

A major redevelopment was undertaken between 1950 and 1952 which raised the capacity of the ground to 40,000 with seating for 18,000 costing IR£15,000. The ground was reopened on 15 June 1952 with a game between the reigning All-Ireland champions Mayo and Meath; which also ended in a draw.

In the late 1980s, covered seating was provided in the Gerry McDonald Stand. In 1990 the Connacht Council decided to grant aid Dr. Hyde Park, County Roscommon with a view to making it the main venue in the province. In reaction to this a further redevelopment was embarked upon by the Castlebar Mitchels club. Over the course of the next 12 years, the ground was converted into a 32,000 all-seater stadium and new dressing rooms, improved press facilities, dug-outs and a wheelchair area were constructed.

In March 2005, the Mayo County Board took control of MacHale Park on a 50-year lease with a view to upgrading the stadium.

In 2008, construction work commenced on a detailed renovation of the ground, to include the construction of a new 10,000 seater stand. The €16 million redevelopment works included improved facilities for spectators, a museum, underground training areas, and County Board offices. As part of these works, the famous façade on the MacHale Road side of the ground was demolished. Funding for the project was generated by the sale of the naming rights for the stadium as well as the sale of season tickets for matches taking place at the ground.

In 2019, on health and safety reasons, the capacity of MacHale Park was reduced by a further 6,000 to 25,369.

During the COVID-19 pandemic, MacHale Park was used as a drive-through test centre.

Having been subject to criticism the pitch at MacHale Park was resurfaced in 2022.

The capacity as of 2025 is approximately 28,000, with attendances of 27,870 (Connacht vs Munster - March 29th 2025) and 27,137 (Mayo vs Galway - May 4th 2025) recorded during the year.

== Rugby union ==
In December 2024, it was announced that Connacht would play against Munster in rugby union at MacHale Park for the first time on 29 March 2025. The match was announced as a 25,000 sell-out within days. Munster beat Connacht 24–30 in front of 27,870 spectators.

Rugby Union Matches
Date	Home	Score	Opponent	Competition	Attendance	Report
29 March 2025	Connacht	24–30	Munster	2024-25 United Rugby Championship	27,870	

== Notable MacHale Park matches ==
Year	Competition	Teams	Score	Notes
1934	National Football League final	Mayo vs Dublin GAA	Mayo 2–3, Dublin 1–6 (draw); Replay: Mayo 2–4, Dublin 1–5	First League final played in MacHale Park; attendance c. 8,000; match ended in a draw and Mayo won the replay at Croke Park; it was the first of six League titles in a row for Mayo.
1952	Connacht Senior Football final	Roscommon GAA vs Mayo	Roscommon 3–5, Mayo 0–6	First Connacht final to take place in MacHale Park following the stadium redevelopment; Mayo were reigning All-Ireland champions (two-in-a-row) and four-time Connacht champions; a journalists' strike meant no reporters were present, the result was sent by telegram to RTÉ and was initially misread on air as Mayo 3–5 Roscommon 0–6.
1962	Connacht Senior Football final	Roscommon vs Galway GAA	Roscommon 3–7, Galway 2–9	Galway led until Aidan Brady broke the crossbar; lengthy delay for repairs and on resumption Roscommon recovered to snatch a famous win.
1975	Connacht Senior Football final replay	Sligo vs Mayo	Sligo 2–10, Mayo 0–15	After a drawn match in Markievicz Park, Sligo, inspired by Mickey Kearins, won their first Connacht title in 47 years, prompting joyous scenes among supporters.
1981	Connacht Senior Football semi-final	Mayo vs Galway	Mayo 2–7, Galway 1–8	Mayo, without a Connacht title for 12 years, upset League champions Galway on a hot summer's day; Willie Nally's high fielding was pivotal. Mayo went on to win the Connacht title that year at MacHale Park.
1991	Connacht Senior Football final	Roscommon vs Mayo	Roscommon 0–14, Mayo 0–14 (draw)	With time almost up it appeared Mayo had regained the title, but Derek Duggan kicked a long-range free to level the game and force a replay.
1992	Connacht Senior Football final	Mayo vs Roscommon	Mayo 1–14, Roscommon 0–10	The MacHale Park crossbar was broken again (this time by Roscommon's Enon Gavin); despite that, Mayo dominated and comfortably regained the title.
2001	All-Ireland Senior Football quarter-final	Galway GAA vs Roscommon	Galway 0–14, Roscommon 1–5	The first All-Ireland series match to take place in MacHale Park, an all-Connacht affair; Galway won convincingly and went on to claim the All-Ireland title that year.
2012	Connacht Senior Club Football final	Ballaghaderreen vs St Brigid's	Ballaghaderreen 0–6, St Brigid's 1–12	Dubbed the "All-Rossie" Connacht final; St Brigid's won a provincial three-in-a-row, a platform from which they went on to win the All-Ireland club title four months later.
2013	2013 Connacht Senior Football Final	Mayo vs London	Mayo 5–11, London 0–10	History made as London played in their first ever Connacht final; Mayo won comfortably to claim a third Connacht title in a row.

== See also ==
- List of Gaelic Athletic Association stadiums
- List of stadiums in Ireland by capacity
