= 2005 All-Ireland Senior Football Championship =

Football championship

Championship details
- Dates: 7 May – 25 September 2005
- Teams: 33

All-Ireland Champions
- Winning team: Tyrone (2nd win)
- Captain: Brian Dooher
- Manager: Mickey Harte

All-Ireland Finalists
- Losing team: Kerry
- Captain: Declan O'Sullivan
- Manager: Jack O'Connor

Provincial Champions
- Munster: Kerry
- Leinster: Dublin
- Ulster: Armagh
- Connacht: Galway

Championship statistics
- No. matches played: 65
- Goals total: 115 (1.77 per game)
- Points total: 1533 (23.58 per game)
- Top Scorer: Stephen O'Neill (5–49)
- Player of the Year: Stephen O'Neill

The All-Ireland Senior Football Championship 2005, known for sponsorship reasons as the 2005 Bank of Ireland All-Ireland Senior Football Championship was the premier Gaelic football competition in 2005. It consisted of 33 teams and began on Saturday 7 May 2005. Few surprises came during the championship with the dominance of the Ulster teams evident once again. Gaelic football's "Big Three" of this era – Armagh, Kerry, Tyrone – all progressed to the semi-finals.

The Championship concluded on Sunday 25 September 2005 when Tyrone defeated Kerry, who were playing in their second consecutive All-Ireland Final, by a scoreline of 1–16 to 2–10. Tyrone had to play ten games (including three replays) in order to win the Championship – more than any other team before or since.

== Format ==
Since the introduction of the so-called "back-door" system a few years ago, a number of changes have taken place in the championship format. In 2005 the following system was used.

The provincial championships in Munster, Leinster, Ulster and Connacht ran as usual on a "knock-out" basis. These provincial games were then followed by the "Qualifier" system:

- Round 1 of the qualifiers included all the counties that did not qualify for the Provincial Semi-finals. An open draw was made to give eight pairings.
- Round 2 consisted of the eight defeated teams in the Provincial Semi-finals playing against the eight winners from Round 1. A draw was made to determine the eight pairings.
- Round 3 Consisted of the 8 winners from Round 2 playing each other in an open draw format.
- Round 4 consisted of each of the four teams defeated in the Provincial Finals shall playing against the four winners from Round 3. A draw was made to determine the four pairings.

The All-Ireland Quarter-finals: Each of the four Provincial Champions played one of the four winners from Round 4. The All-Ireland Semi-finals shall be on a Provincial rots basis, initially determined by the Central Council. If a Provincial Championship winning team is defeated in its Quarter-final, the team that defeats it shall take its place in the semi-final.

== Provincial championships ==
=== Munster Senior Football Championship ===
Quarter-finals
Clare | 2–14
Waterford | 2–10
Tipperary | 0–13
Kerry | 2–22

Semi-finals
Clare | 0–06
Cork | 0–18
Limerick | 0–10
Kerry | 2–10

Final
Cork | 0–11
Kerry | 1–11

==== Quarter-finals ====
29 May 2005
Quarter-final

| Tipperary | 0–13 – 2–22 | Kerry |
|---|---|---|
| D Browne 0–9, B Hickey 0–1, K Mulryan 0–1, F O'Callaghan 0–1, P Morrisey 0–1. | Report | C Cooper 1–5, MF Russell 0–8, E Brosnan 1–4, L Hassett 0–3, M Ó Sé 0–1, B Sheehan 0–1. |

Semple Stadium, Thurles
Referee: D Fahy (Longford)

29 May 2005
Quarter-final

| Clare | 2–14 – 2–10 | Waterford |
|---|---|---|
| R Donnelly 1–6, E Coughlan 1–3, O O' Dwyer 0–2, D Russell, P O'Dwyer, S Hickey 0–1 each | Report | N Curran 1–8, G Hurney 1–1, S Briggs 0–1 |

Cusack Park, Ennis

==== Semi-finals ====
12 June 2005
Semi-final

| Clare | 0–06 – 0–18 | Cork |
|---|---|---|
| R Donnelly 0–3 (1f), O O'Dwyer 0–2 (1f), S Hickey 0–1. | Report | M O Croinin 0–6 (3f), J Masters 0–5 (1f, 1 '45'), C McCarthy 0–2, F Gould, J Hayes, N Murphy, K O'Sullivan, A Cronin 0–1 each. |

Cusack Park, Ennis

19 June 2005
Semi-final

| Limerick | 0–10 – 2–10 | Kerry |
|---|---|---|
| M Gavin 0–7, S Lavin, C Mullane, C Fitzgerald 0–1 each. | Report | C Cooper 2–5, E Fitzmaurice, L Hassett, D O Cinneide, S Moynihan, B Sheehan 0–1 each |

Páirc na nGael, Limerick

==== Final ====
10 July 2005
Final

| Kerry | 1–11 – 0–11 | Cork |
|---|---|---|
| D O'Sullivan 1–0, C Cooper, T Ò Sè, D Ò Cinnèide 0–2 each, MF Russell, L Hassett, M Ò Sè, E Brosnan, D Ò Sè 0–1 each. | Report | J Masters 0–3, J Hayes, M Ò Crònìn 0–2 each, F Goold, C McCarthy, N O'Leary, P Clifford 0–1 each. |

Páirc Uí Chaoimh, Cork
Attendance: 32,000
Referee: D. Coldrick (Meath)

=== Leinster Senior Football Championship ===
1st round
Offaly | 1–15
Louth | 1–06
Wicklow | 2–12
Kildare | 1–17
Dublin | 2–23
Longford | 0–10

Quarter-finals
Offaly | 1–08
Laois | 1–10
Kildare | 0–14
Westmeath | 0–11
Dublin | 1–12
Meath | 1–10
Wexford | 3–12
Carlow | 2–10

Semi-finals
Laois | 0–21
Kildare | 0–09
Dublin | 1–17
Wexford | 2–10

Final
Laois | 0–13
Dublin | 0–14

==== Round 1 ====
7 May 2005
1st round

| Offaly | 1–15 – 1–06 | Louth |
|---|---|---|
| | Report |

Páirc Tailteann, Navan
Attendance: 6500
Referee: Michael Hughes

15 May 2005
1st round

| Kildare | 1–17 – 2–12 | Wicklow |
|---|---|---|
| J Doyle 0–7, T Fennin 1–3, E Callaghan 0–3, M Foley, R Sweeney, K Brennan, K Ennis 0–1 each | Report | P Earls 1–6, T Harney 1–1, W O'Gorman 0–2, D Dillon, L Glynn, A Ellis 0–1 each |

Croke Park, Dublin
Referee: F. Flynn (Leitrim)

15 May 2005
1st round

| Dublin | 2–23 – 0–10 | Longford |
|---|---|---|
| C Keaney 1–4, A Brogan 1–3, T Quinn 0–5, B Cullen, S Ryan, M Vaughan 0–2 each, J Sherlock, C Moran, C Goggins, C Whelan, D O'Callaghan 0–1 each | Report | P Davis 0–7, J Martin, B Kavanagh, N Sheridan 0–1 each |

Croke Park, Dublin
Referee: P. Russell (Tipperary)

==== Quarter-finals ====
29 May 2005
Quarter-final

| Kildare | 0–14 – 0–11 | Westmeath |
|---|---|---|
| J Doyle 0–6, T Fennin 0–4, M Foley, D Earley, R Sweeney, D McCormack 0–1 each | Report | D Dolan 0–7, A Mangan, Wilson, P Mulvihill, Paul Conway 0–1 each |

Croke Park, Dublin

29 May 2005
Quarter-final

| Laois | 1–10 – 1–08 | Offaly |
|---|---|---|
| R Munnelly 1–4, C Conway 0–2, P Clancy, N Garvan, D Brennan, K Fitzpatrick 0–1 each | Report | M Daly 1–1, N Coughlan 0–2, C Quinn, N McNamee, P Kelleghan, J Coughlan, J Reynolds 0–1 each |

Croke Park, Dublin
Attendance: 35485
Referee: Michael Collins (Cork)

5 June 2005
Quarter-final

| Dublin | 1–12 – 1–10 | Meath |
|---|---|---|
| B Cahill 0–1, A Brogan 1–3, B Cullen 0–1, C Keaney 0–3, T Quinn 0–1, S Connell 0–1, M Vaughan 0–2 | Report | J Sheridan 1–0, B Farrell 0–4, G Geraghty 0–3, N Crawford, N Kelly, D Regan 0–1 each |

Croke Park, Dublin
Referee: J. Bannon (Longford)

5 June 2005
Quarter-final

| Wexford | 3–12 – 2–10 | Carlow |
|---|---|---|
| M Forde 1–6, D Fogarty 1–1, PJ Banville 1–0, D Breen, R Barry, S Cullen, P Colfer, D Kinsella 0–1 each | Report | S Rea 1–5, M Carpenter 1–0, P Hickey 0–2, T Walsh, B Carberry 0–1 each |

Croke Park, Dublin
Referee: J. McKee (Armagh)

==== Semi-finals ====
19 June 2005
Semi-final

| Laois | 0–21 – 0–09 | Kildare |
|---|---|---|
| R Munnelly 0–7, B Brennan 0–4, C Conway 0–3, B Sheehan 0–2, K Fitzpatrick, N Garvan, B McDonald 0–1 each | Report | D McCormack, J Doyle 0–2 each, M Foley, T Fennin, S McKenzie Smith 0–1 each |

Croke Park, Dublin
Referee: J. Geaney (Cork)

19 June 2005
Semi-final

| Dublin | 1–17 – 2–10 | Wexford |
|---|---|---|
| T Quinn 0–10, J Sherlock 1–0, C Whelan, C Moran 0–2 each, A Brogan, B Cullen, C Keaney 0–1 each | Report | P.J. Banville 1–2, R Barry 1–1, K Kennedy 0–2, D Fogarty, J Hudson 0–1 each |

Croke Park, Dublin

==== Final ====
17 July 2005
Final

| Dublin | 0–14 – 0–13 | Laois |
|---|---|---|
| Tomás Quinn 0–4 (0-3f, 1 '45), Bryan Cullen 0–3, Jason Sherlock 0–2, Stephen O'Shaughnessy, Ciaran Whelan, Collie Moran, Alan Brogan, Conal Keaney 0–1 each | Report | Ross Munnelly 0–5 (0-2f), Chris Conway 0–4 (0-2f), Noel Garvan and Donie Brennan 0–2 each |

Croke Park, Dublin
Attendance: 81,025
Referee: Joe McQuillan (Cavan)

=== Ulster Senior Football Championship ===
Preliminary round
Fermanagh | 1–07
Armagh | 2–12

Quarter-finals
Monaghan | 2–08
Derry | 1–17
Donegal | 1–10
Armagh | 3–11
Down | 1–06
Tyrone | 1–13
Antrim | 2–06
Cavan | 1–15

Semi-finals
Derry | 0–10
Armagh | 1–11
Tyrone | 3–19
Cavan | 0–07

Final
Armagh | 0–13
Tyrone | 0–11

==== Round 1 ====
15 May 2005
1st round

| Armagh | 2–12 – 1–07 | Fermanagh |
|---|---|---|
| | Report |

St. Tiernach's Park, Clones

==== Quarter-finals ====
22 May 2005
Quarter-final

| Tyrone | 1–13 – 1–06 | Down |
|---|---|---|
| M Penrose 1–1, O Mulligan 0–3, S O'Neill, P Canavan, S Cavanagh 0–2 each, P Jordan, R Mellon, E McGinley 0–1 each | Report | B Coulter 1–1, A Rodgers 0–3, L Doyle 0–2 |

Healy Park, Omagh

29 May 2005
Quarter-final

| Cavan | 0–11 – 0–11 | Antrim |
|---|---|---|
| | Report |

Breffni Park, Cavan

4 June 2005
Quarter-final Replay

| Cavan | 1–15 – 2–06 | Antrim |
|---|---|---|
| | Report |

Casement Park, Belfast

5 June 2005
Quarter-final

| Derry | 1–17 – 2–08 | Monaghan |
|---|---|---|
| Paddy Bradley 1–10, E. Muldoon 0–3, P Murphy 0–2, C Devlin, Patsy Bradley 0–1 each | Report | S McManus 1–1, H McElroy 1–0, P Finlay 0–3, D Freeman 0–2, T Freeman, S Gollogly 0–1 each |

St. Tiernach's Park, Clones
Referee: M. Duffy (Sligo)

12 June 2005
Quarter-final

| Armagh | 0–12 – 0–12 | Donegal |
|---|---|---|
| R Clarke 0–3, Aaron Kernan, O McConville, S McDonnell, Brian Mallon 0–2 each, P McGrane 0–1, | Report | C McFadden 0–5, Adrian Sweeney 0–4, C Toye, B Roper, B Devenney 0–1 each |

St. Tiernach's Park, Clones
Referee: J. McQuillan (Cavan)

18 June 2005
Quarter-final Replay

| Armagh | 3–11 – 1–10 | Donegal |
|---|---|---|
| S McDonnell 1–3, R Clarke 1–1, M Mackin 1–0, A Kernan 0–3, M O'Rourke 0–2, O McConville, A O'Rourke 0–1 each | Report | B Devenney 1–4, C McFadden 0–6 |

St. Tiernach's Park, Clones
Referee: M. Deegan (Laois)

==== Semi-finals ====
19 June 2005
Semi-final

| Tyrone | 0–10 – 1–07 | Cavan |
|---|---|---|
| S O'Neill 0–4, P Canavan 0–3, R McMenamin 0–2, O Mulligan 0–1 | Report | J O'Reilly 1–1, L Reilly 0–3, M Cahill, F O'Reilly, Lyng 0–1 each |

St. Tiernach's Park, Clones

25 June 2005
Semi-final Replay

| Tyrone | 3–19 – 0–07 | Cavan |
|---|---|---|
| P Canavan 1–7, S O'Neill 1–5, P Jordan 1–1, C Gormley 0–2, S Cavanagh, M Penrose 0–1 each | Report | J O'Reilly 0–3, M McKeever 0–2, M Lyng, F O'Reilly 0–1 each |

St. Tiernach's Park, Clones
Referee: P. Russell (Tipperary)

26 June 2005
Semi-final

| Armagh | 1–11 – 0–10 | Derry |
|---|---|---|
| A Kernan 0–4, B Mallon, S McDonnell 0–2 each, M O'Rourke, O McConville, R Clarke 0–1 each | Report | Paddy Bradley 0–5, E Bradley 0–2, P Murphy, M Lynch, E. Muldoon 0–1 each |

Casement Park, Belfast
Referee: M. Monahan (Kildare)

==== Final ====
10 July 2005
Final

| Armagh | 2–08 – 0–14 | Tyrone |
|---|---|---|
| S McDonnell 1–2, O McConville 1–1, A Kernan, P McGrane, R Clarke, B Mallon, J McEntee 0–1 each | Report | S O'Neill 0–10, B Dooher 0–2, C Gormley, S Cavanagh 0–1 each |

Croke Park, Dublin
Referee: P. McEnaney (Monaghan)

23 July 2005
Final Replay

| Armagh | 0–13 – 0–11 | Tyrone |
|---|---|---|
| O McConville 0–4, R Clarke 0–3, A Kernan, S McDonnell 0–2 each, B Mallon, P McKeever 0–1 each | Report | S O'Neill 0–5, R McMenamin, D Harte, B Dooher, B McGuigan, M Penrose, R Mallon 0–1 each |

Croke Park, Dublin
Referee: M. Collins (Cork)

=== Connacht Senior Football Championship ===
Quarter-finals
Sligo | 0–09
Leitrim | 1–11
New York | 0–06
Galway | 3–14
London | 1–08
Roscommon | 0–12

Semi-finals
Leitrim | 1–08
Galway | 1–11
Mayo | 1–16
Roscommon | 0–11

Final
Galway | 0–10
Mayo | 0–08

==== Quarter-finals ====
15 May 2005
Quarter-final

| New York | 0–06 – 3–14 | Galway |
|---|---|---|
| PJ Ward 0–4, M Keaveney, M Mitchell 0–1 each | Report | M Meehan 2–2, P Clancy 1–2, M Clancy 0–3, J Bergin, M Donnellan, P Joyce 0–2 each, S Walsh 0–1. |

Gaelic Park, New York
Attendance: 5,000

22 May 2005
Quarter-final

| Leitrim | 1–11 – 0–09 | Sligo |
|---|---|---|
| J Goldrick 1–0, J Glancy, D Maxwell, Michael Foley 0–3 each, D Duignan 0–2, | Report | M Breheny 0–3, J Davey, S Davey 0–2 each, A Marren, J McPartland 0–1 each |

Páirc Seán Mac Diarmada, Carrick-on-Shannon

29 May 2005
Quarter-final

| London | 1–08 – 0–12 | Roscommon |
|---|---|---|
| B Solan 0–5, S McInerney 1–0, S Hehir, J Coffey, S Doran 0–1 each | Report | G Heneghan 0–5, S Lohan, E Kenny 0–2 each, S O'Neill, M Finneran, G Cox 0–1 each |

Ruislip, London

==== Semi-finals ====
12 June 2005
Semi-final

| Galway | 1–11 – 1–08 | Leitrim |
|---|---|---|
| | Report |

Pearse Stadium, Galway

19 June 2005
Semi-final

| Roscommon | 0–11 – 1–16 | Mayo |
|---|---|---|
| G Heneghan 0–5, G Cox 0–2, M Ryan, J Rogers, F Grehan, J Dunning 0–1 each | Report | C Mortimer 1–4, BJ Padden 0–3, A Moran, C McDonald, T Mortimer 0–2 each, S Carolan, A Dillon, James Gill 0–1 each |

Dr. Hyde Park, Roscommon

==== Final ====
10 July 2005
Final

| Galway | 0–10 – 0–08 | Mayo |
|---|---|---|
| M Donnellan 0–4, P Joyce, M Meehan 0–2 each, K Comer, D Savage 0–1 each | Report | C Mortimer 0–4, G Ruane, C McDonald, A Dillon, BJ Padden 0–1 each |

Pearse Stadium, Galway
Attendance: 29, 711
Referee: J. Gainey

== All-Ireland qualifiers ==
The losers of the Preliminary round matches and quarter final matches of each provincial championship started the qualifier.

=== Round 1 ===
| 25 June 2005 | Louth | 1–12 – 1–08 | Waterford | Drogheda Park, Drogheda |
| | D Clarke 0–5, JP Rooney 1–0, P Matthews, S Lennon 0–2 each, D Devanney, R Carroll, N McDonnell 0–1 each | Report | L Ó Lionáin 1–1, N Curran 0–4, A Hubbard, G Hurney, S Walsh 0–1 each |

| 25 June 2005 | Antrim | 0–13 – 5–12 | Meath | Casement Park, Belfast |
| | | Report |

| 25 June 2005 | Sligo | 0–18 – 0–16 | Longford | Markievicz Park, Sligo |
| | M Breheny 0–5, S Davey, E O'Hara 0–4 each, D McGarty, D Sloyan, D McTernan, G McGowan 0–1 each | Report | B Kavanagh, P Bardon 0–5 each, J Martin 0–2, L Keenan, T Smullen, K Mulligan, P Dowd 0–1 each | Referee: J. White (Donegal) |

| 25 June 2005 | Carlow | 0–14 – 1–10 | Offaly | Dr. Cullen Park, Carlow |
| | S Rea 0–8, M Carpenter, B Kelly 0–2 each, C McCarthy, B Carbery 0–1 each | Report | N McNamee 1–6, M Daly 0–2, N Coughlan, J Reynolds 0–1 each | Referee: Aidan Mangan (Kerry) |

| 25 June 2005 | Tipperary | 1–08 – 0–12 | Westmeath | Semple Stadium, Thurles |
| | | Report | | Referee: H. Beirne (Roscommon) |

| 25 June 2005 | Down | 1–11 – 0–07 | Fermanagh | Páirc Esler, Newry |
| | B Coulter 0–4, R Sexton 1–0, L Doyle 0–2, M Cole, P Murphy, A O'Prey, S Ward, D Gordan 0–1 each | Report | T Brewster, C Bradley 0–2 each, D Kelly, E Maguire, R Gallagher 0–1 each |

| 25 June 2005 | Monaghan | 2–18 – 1–09 | London | St. Tiernach's Park, Clones |

| 26 June 2005 | Wicklow | 0–12 – 0–16 | Donegal | Aughrim Park, Aughrim |
| | W O'Gorman 0–4, T Harney, J Daniels 0–2 each, G Duffy, B Ó hAnnaidh, D Smullen, L Glynn 0–1 each | Report | C McFadden 0–6, B Devenney 0–3, A Sweeney 0–2, N Gallagher, C Toye, B Roper, R Bradley 0–1 each | Referee: G. Kinneavey (Galway) |

=== Round 2 ===
The winners of round 1 were joined by the semi-final losers of each provincial championship. The matches would be between a round 2 winner and a provincial championship semi final loser.

| 2 July 2005 | Leitrim | 1–08 – 1–12 | Meath | Páirc Seán Mac Diarmada, Carrick-on-Shannon |
| | | Report |

| 2 July 2005 | Clare | 0–12 – 0–09 | Westmeath | Cusack Park, Ennis |
| | O O'Dwyer, R Donnelly 0–3 each, E Coughlan 0–2, G Quinlan, P O'Dwyer, D Russell 0–1 each | Report | Denis Glennon 0–3, A Mangan, David Glennon 0–2 each, P Mulvihill, F Wilson 0–1 each | Referee: F. Flynn (Leitrim) |

| 2 July 2005 | Down | 2–09 – 3–08 | Derry | Páirc Esler, Newry |
| | B Coulter 1–2, R Sexton 1–0, A Rodgers, D Hughes 0–2 each, P Murphy, R Murtagh, J Clarke 0–1 each | Report | Paddy Bradley 1–4, E. Muldoon 1–1, E Bradley 1–0, M Lynch 0–2, J McBride 0–1 | Referee: S. McCormack (Meath) |

| 2 July 2005 | Cavan | 1–11 – 1–10 | Donegal | Breffni Park, Cavan |
| | F Reilly 0–6, L Reilly 1–2, A Forde, M McKeever 0–1 each | Report | B Devenney 1–5, C McFadden 0–3, B Roper, A Sweeney 0–1 each | Referee: E. Murtagh (Longford) |

| 2 July 2005 | Carlow | 0–07 – 2–15 | Limerick | Dr. Cullen Park, Carlow |
| | | Report |

| 2 July 2005 | Sligo | 1–11 – 1–10 | Kildare | Markievicz Park, Sligo |
| | J McPartland 1–1, M Brehony 0–4, D Sloyan 0–3, S Davey 0–2, D McTernan 0–1 | Report | T Fennin 0–7, J Doyle 1–2, D Lyons 0–1 | Referee: M. Hughes (Tyrone) |

| 2 July 2005 | Louth | 0–11 – 0–10 | Roscommon | Drogheda Park, Drogheda |
| | | Report |

| 9 July 2005 | Monaghan | 0–17 – 0–12 | Wexford | St. Tiernach's Park, Clones |
| | P Finlay, T Freeman 0–4 each, H McElroy 0–3, D Freeman 0–2, G McQuaid, R Ronaghan, N Corrigan, D McKernan 0–1 each | Report | M Forde 0–7, D Kinsella 0–3, P Curtis, N Lambert 0–1 each | Referee: P. McGovern (Galway) |

=== Round 3 ===
The winners of round 2 contest as the matches from here were lowered to four. Matches were open.

| 16 July 2005 | Monaghan | 1–12 – 0–14 | Louth | Breffni Park, Cavan |
| | H McElroy 1–3, P Finlay 0–5, D Clerkin, T Freeman 0–2 each | Report | D Clarke 0–10, C Grimes, P Matthews, N McDonnell, S Lennon 0–1 each | Referee: M. Duffy (Sligo) |

| 17 July 2005 | Cavan | 1–08 – 1–06 | Meath | St. Tiernach's Park, Clones |
| | S Johnston 0–3, J O'Reilly 1–0, D McCabe, F O'Reilly 0–2 each, L Reilly 0–1 | Report | G Geraghty 1–1, J Sheridan 0–3, P Byrne, R Magee 0–1 each | Referee: G O Conamha (Galway) |

| 17 July 2005 | Sligo | 1–13 – 0–11 | Clare | McHale Park, Castlebar |
| | M Breheny 1–6, J McPartland 0–3, S Davey 0–2, P Naughton, J Davey 0–1 each | Report | R Donnelly 0–6, P O'Dwyer 0–2, E Coughlan, O O'Dwyer, M O'Dwyer 0–1 each | Referee: M. Deegan (Laois) |

| 17 July 2005 | Derry | 0–13 – 0–09 | Limerick | McHale Park, Castlebar |
| | Paddy Bradley 0–6, E Bradley 0–3, M Lynch 0–2, P McFlynn, G Donaghy 0–1 each | Report | M Gavin 0–8, S Kelly 0–1 | Referee: J. Bannon (Longford) |

=== Round 4 ===
The winners of round 3 were joined by the losers of each provincial championship final. The matches would be between a round 3 winner and the loser of a provincial championship final.

| 30 July 2005 | Mayo | 0–11 – 0–08 | Cavan | Dr. Hyde Park, Roscommon |
| | M Moyles, A Dillon, A O'Malley 0–2 each, P Kelly, R McGarrity, C McDonald, J Gill, M McNicholas 0–1 each | Report | D McCabe, L Reilly 0–3 each, F O'Reilly 0–2 | Referee: T. Quigley (Wexford) |

| 30 July 2005 | Cork | 3–13 – 0–11 | Sligo | O'Moore Park, Portlaoise |
| | J Hayes 0–4, N O'Leary 0–3, N Murphy, K MacMahon, J Masters 1–0 each, BG O'Sullivan 0–2, D Kavanagh, C McCarthy, M Cronin, P Clifford 0–1 each | Report | S Davey 0–4, M Breheny 0–3, J McPartland, D Sloyan, B Curran, G McGowan 0–1 each | Referee: M. Hughes (Tyrone) |

| 6 August 2005 | Laois | 1–11 – 0–11 | Derry | Croke Park, Dublin |
| | R Munnelly 0–4, B Sheehan 1–1, D Brennan, T Kelly, N Garvan, P Clancy, G Kavanagh, S Kelly 0–1 each | Report | Paddy Bradley 0–4, P Murphy 0–2, P Kelly, E Bradley, J McBride, M Lynch, E. Muldoon 0–1 each | Referee: P. Russell (Tipperary) |

| 6 August 2005 | Tyrone | 2–14 – 1–07 | Monaghan | Croke Park, Dublin |
| | S O'Neill 2–6, P Canavan 0–2, D Harte, C Gormley, S Cavanagh, R Mellon, M Penrose 0–1 each | Report | T Freeman 1–1, H McElroy 0–3, P Finlay 0–2, R Woods 0–1 | Referee: M. Monahan (Kildare) |

== All-Ireland ==
The provincial champions and the winners of round 4 contested the quarter-finals. The quarter final matches would be between a provincial champion and a round 4 winner.

Quarter-finals
Kerry | 2–15
Mayo | 0–18
Cork | 2–14
Galway | 2–11
Armagh | 2–17
Laois | 1–11
Tyrone | 2–18
Dublin | 1–14

Semi-finals
Kerry | 1–19
Cork | 0–9
Armagh | 1–12
Tyrone | 1–13

Final
Tyrone | 1–16
Kerry | 2–10

=== Quarter-finals ===
7 August 2005
Quarter-final

| Kerry | 2–15 – 0–18 | Mayo |
|---|---|---|
| C Cooper 1–1, D Ó Sé 1–0, MF Russell, P Galvin 0–3 each, E Brosnan 0–2, A O'Mahony, W Kirby, L Hassett, D O'Sullivan, M Ó Sé, D O Cinneide 0–1 each, | Report | C McDonald 0–6, A O'Malley 0–5, A Dillon 0–4, B Moran, A Moran, D Heaney 0–1 each |

Croke Park, Dublin
Referee: B. Crowe (Cavan)

7 August 2005
Quarter-final

| Cork | 2–14 – 2–11 | Galway |
|---|---|---|
| BJ O'Sullivan, J Hayes 1–3 each, J Masters 0–3, A Lynch 0–2, E Sexton, K McMahon, P Clifford 0–1 each | Report | M Meehan 2–2, P Joyce 0–7, S Armstrong 0–2 |

Croke Park, Dublin
Referee: M. Deegan (Laois)

13 August 2005
Quarter-final

| Tyrone | 1–14 – 1–14 | Dublin |
|---|---|---|
| S O'Neill 0–6, O Mulligan 1–1, S Cavanagh 0–3, R Mellon, E McGinley, B McGuigan, B Dooher 0–1 each | Report | T Quinn 1–7, C Keaney 0–3, J Sherlock, A Brogan 0–2 each |

Croke Park, Dublin

20 August 2005
Quarter-final

| Armagh | 2–17 – 1–11 | Laois |
|---|---|---|
| S McDonnell 1–5, O McConville 1–3, R Clarke 0–3, A Kernan, M O'Rourke 0–2 each, P McGrane, J McEntee 0–1 each | Report | B Brennan 1–1, R Munnelly 0–4, B Sheehan 0–3, P Clancy, S Kelly, C Conway 0–1 each |

Croke Park, Dublin
Referee: J. Geaney (Cork)

27 August 2005
Quarter-final Replay

| Tyrone | 2–18 – 1–14 | Dublin |
|---|---|---|
| O Mulligan 1–7, S O'Neill 1–3, B Dooher 0–3, S Cavanagh, R Mellon 0–2 each, B McGuigan 0–1, | Report | C Keaney 0–4, T Quinn 0–3, D Farrell 1–0, A Brogan 0–2, S Ryan, C Moran, B Cullen, J Sherlock, S Connell 0–1 each |

Croke Park, Dublin
Referee: G. O Conamha (Galway)

=== Semi-finals ===
28 August 2005
Semi-final

| Kerry | 1–19 – 0–09 | Cork |
|---|---|---|
| E Brosnan 1–2, C Cooper 0–5, P Galvin 0–3, B Sheehan 0–2, D Ó Cinneide, M McCarthy, L Hassett, T Ó Sé, A O'Mahony, W Kirby, MF Russell 0–1 each | Report | J Masters, K McMahon, P Clifford, J Hayes 0–2 each, A Lynch 0–1 |

Croke Park, Dublin
Referee: J. McQuillan (Cavan)

4 September 2005
Semi-final

| Tyrone | 1–11 – 1–12 | Armagh |
|---|---|---|
| S O'Neill 1–4, O Mulligan 0–3, S Cavanagh, P Canavan 0–2 each, R McMenamin, S Sweeney 0–1 each | Report | S McDonnell 1–3, O McConville 0–3, A Kernan 0–2, K McGeeney, R Clarke, B Mallon 0–1 each |

Croke Park, Dublin
Referee: P. Russell (Tipperary)

=== Final ===
25 September 2005
Final

| Kerry | 2–10 – 1–16 | Tyrone |
|---|---|---|
| C Cooper 0–5, D Ó Cinnéide 1–1, T Ó Sé 1–0, D Ó Sé, E Brosnan 0–2 each | Report | O Mulligan 0–5, P Canavan 1–1, B McGuigan, S O'Neill 0–3 each, R Mellon 0–2, P Jordan, B Dooher 0–1 each |

Croke Park, Dublin
Attendance: 82,112
Referee: M. Monahan (Kildare)

== Championship statistics ==
=== Miscellaneous ===
- For the first time since 1991 Kildare vs Westmeath in the Leinster championship.
- Dublin played Laois in the Leinster final for the first time 1985.
- In the old system there would have been Kerry vs Galway and Dublin vs Armagh All Ireland semi-finals.

=== Top scorers ===
Season

| Player | County | Scores | Total |
|---|---|---|---|
| Stephen O'Neill | Tyrone | 5–49 | 64 |
| Paddy Bradley | Derry | 2–29 | 35 |
| Colm Cooper | Kerry | 4–22 | 34 |
| Steven McDonnell | Armagh | 4–21 | 33 |
| Tomás Quinn | Dublin | 1–29 | 32 |
| Ross Munnelly | Laois | 1–24 | 27 |
| Hugh McElroy | Monaghan | 3–17 | 26 |
| Owen Mulligan | Tyrone | 2–20 | 26 |

Single game

| Player | Tally | Opposition |
|---|---|---|
| Paddy Bradley (Derry) | 1–10 | Monaghan |
| Stephen O'Neill (Tyrone) | 2-06 | Monaghan |
| Hugh McElroy (Monaghan) | 1-09 | London |
| Niall Curran (Waterford) | 1-08 | Clare |
| Colm Cooper (Kerry) | 2-05 | Limerick |
