= Madden (name) =

Name list

Madden is the Anglicized surname of Madadhan of Irish origin, meaning "hound". It is also a less popular, gender-neutral given name. According to historian C. Thomas Cairney, the O'Maddens were a chiefly family of the Uí Mháine tribe who in turn were from the Dumnonii or Laigin who were the third wave of Celts to settle in Ireland during the first century BC.

== Notable people with the surname "Madden" include ==
=== A ===
- Alexander Madden (1895–1964), English naval officer
- Alf Madden, Australian rugby league footballer
- Ambrose Madden (1820–1863), Irish soldier
- Anita Madden (1933–2018), American sportswoman
- Anne Madden (disambiguation), multiple people
- Aodhán Madden (1947–2015), Irish playwright

=== B ===
- Beezie Madden (born 1963), American equestrian
- Benji Madden (born 1979), American guitarist
- Bill Madden (disambiguation), multiple people
- Billy Madden (1852–1918), American boxer
- Bobby Madden (born 1978), Scottish football referee
- Brett Madden (1978–2020), American voice actress, actress and producer
- Bunny Madden (1882–1954), American baseball player

=== C ===
- Cain Madden (born 1996), American football player
- Cecil Madden (1902–1987), English television producer
- Charles Madden (disambiguation), multiple people
- Chris Madden (disambiguation), multiple people
- Ciaran Madden (born 1942), English actress
- Cian Madden (born 1999), Irish Gaelic footballer
- Cicely Madden (born 1995), American rower
- Claire Madden (1905–1998), Irish librarian
- Conor Madden (born 1994), Irish Gaelic footballer
- Craig Madden (born 1958), English footballer

=== D ===
- Dave Madden (1931–2014), Canadian-American actor
- David Madden (disambiguation), multiple people
- Deirdre Madden (born 1960), Irish writer
- Denis Madden (born 1948), Irish soldier
- Denis J. Madden (born 1940), American bishop
- Dennis Madden (1913–1967), Welsh rugby union footballer
- Diane Madden (born 1958), American dancer
- Dodgson Hamilton Madden (1840–1928), Irish politician
- Donald Madden (1928–1983), American actor

=== E ===
- Ed Madden, American poet and scholar
- Edward Madden (disambiguation), multiple people
- Elaine Madden (1923–2012), Belgian-British soldier
- Etain Madden (1939–1982), Irish political activist
- Eva Anne Madden (1863–1958), American educator

=== F ===
- Frank Madden (disambiguation), multiple people
- Frederic Madden (1801–1873), English palaeographer
- Fred H. Madden (born 1954), American politician

=== G ===
- Gene Madden (1890–1949), American baseball player
- George Peter Madden (1887–1977), American lawyer and politician
- Golda Madden (1886–1960), American actress
- Gerard Madden, Irish author
- Grace Madden (1911–1987), American figure skater

=== H ===
- Harry Dennis Madden (1895–1945), Canadian politician

=== J ===
- Jack Madden, American basketball referee
- James Madden (disambiguation), multiple people
- Jeanne Madden (1917–1989), American singer
- Jeff Madden, American strength coach
- Jim Madden (born 1958), Australian politician
- J. Lester Madden (1909–1984), American figure skater
- Joanie Madden, American musician
- Jock Madden (born 2000), Australian rugby league footballer
- Joel Madden (born 1979), American singer and record producer
- John Madden (1936–2021), American football coach and sportscaster
- John Madden (disambiguation), multiple people
- Johnny Madden (1865–1948), Scottish footballer
- Justin Madden (born 1961), Australian rules footballer and politician
- J. Warren Madden (1890–1972), American lawyer and judge

=== K ===
- Kathleen Madden, American mathematician
- Kerry Madden (born 1961), American author
- Kevin Madden (born 1972), American pundit
- Kid Madden (1866–1896), American baseball player

=== L ===
- Lawrie Madden (born 1955), English footballer
- Lee Madden (1927–2009), American film director
- Len Madden (1890–1949), American baseball player
- Liam Madden (born 1983/1984), American soldier and entrepreneur
- Lisa Madden (born 1992), Irish model
- Lloyd Madden (1918–2011), American football player

=== M ===
- Madeleine Madden (born 1997), Australian actress
- Mark Madden (born 1960), American journalist and broadcaster
- Martin Madden (disambiguation), multiple people
- Martyn Madden (born 1973), Welsh rugby union footballer
- Mathilde Madden, British author
- Matt Madden (born 1968), American writer
- Maureen Madden (born 1959), American politician
- Max Madden (born 1941), British politician
- Miah Madden (born 2002), Australian actress
- Michael Madden (disambiguation), multiple people
- Mick Madden (Australian footballer) (1882–1943), Australian rules footballer
- Mickey Madden (born 1979), American musician
- Mike Madden (baseball) (born 1958), American baseball player
- Morgan Madden (1906–1962), Irish hurler
- Morris Madden (born 1960), American baseball player

=== N ===
- Niall Madden (born 1985), Irish jockey

=== O ===
- Owen Madden (disambiguation), multiple people
- Owney Madden (1891–1965), American gangster

=== P ===
- Paddy Madden (born 1990), Irish footballer
- Paige Madden (born 1998), American swimmer
- Patrick Madden (essayist), American writer
- Paul Madden (disambiguation), multiple people
- Peter Madden (disambiguation), multiple people

=== R ===
- Rashad Madden (born 1992), American basketball player
- Ray Madden (1892–1987), American politician
- Richard Madden (born 1986), Scottish actor
- Richard Robert Madden (1798–1886), Irish physician and historian
- Roland Madden (born 1938), American meteorologist
- Ron Madden (1923–2012), Australian rugby league footballer
- Russell Madden (disambiguation), multiple people

=== S ===
- Samuel Madden (disambiguation), multiple people
- Simon Madden (born 1957), Australian rules footballer
- Simon Madden (Irish footballer) (born 1988), Irish footballer
- Sinéad Madden, Irish singer-songwriter
- Stacey Madden (born 1982), Canadian writer
- Stella Madden, English actress
- Steve Madden (born 1958), American businessman
- Suzanne Madden, American astronomer

=== T ===
- Tamara Natalie Madden (1975–2017), Jamaican-American painter
- Thomas Madden (disambiguation), multiple people
- Tim Madden, Australian disc jockey
- Timothy Madden, American politician
- T Kira Madden (born 1988), American writer
- Tommy Madden (1883–1930), American baseball player
- Travois Madden (born 1972), American Electrician
- Tre Madden (born 1993), American football player
- Ty Madden (born 2000), American baseball player
- Tyler Madden (born 1999), American ice hockey player

=== W ===
- Walter Madden (1848–1925), Australian politician
- W. C. Madden (born 1947), American journalist
- William Madden (disambiguation), multiple people

== Given name ==
- Madden Williams (born 2007), American football player

== See also ==
- Admiral Madden (disambiguation), a disambiguation page for Admirals with the surname Madden
- Judge Madden (disambiguation), a disambiguation page for Judges with the surname Madden
- Senator Madden (disambiguation), a disambiguation page for Senators with the surname Madden

== See also ==
- Irish clans
