= Admiral Madden =

Admiral Madden may refer to:

- Alexander Madden (1895–1964), British Royal Navy admiral
- Sir Charles Madden, 1st Baronet (1862–1935), British Royal Navy admiral
- Sir Charles Madden, 2nd Baronet (1906–2001), British Royal Navy admiral
