= Madden =

Madden may refer to:

== People ==
- Madden (name), a page for people with the given and surname of Madden
- Madadhan, a page for people with the surname Madadhan
- Madden (music producer) (born 1989), Norwegian singer, songwriter and producer

== Music ==
- "Madden" (song), a 2019 song by Joyryde
- The Madden Brothers, an American pop rock duo

== Places ==
- Madden, Alberta, Canada
- Madden, County Armagh, Northern Ireland
- Madden, Mississippi, United States
- Madden Building, a skyscraper in Detroit, Michigan, United States
- Madden Dam, a dam across the Chagres River, in Panama

== Other ==
- Madden baronets, a UK baronetage
- Madden NFL, American football simulation video game series
- Madden NFL Football, American football simulation for the Nintendo 3DS portable game console
- Madden (film), a 2026 American biographical film
