= Charles Madden =

Charles Madden may refer to:

- Sir Charles Madden, 1st Baronet (1862–1935), Royal Navy Admiral, Commander-in-Chief of the Atlantic Fleet in World War One, First Sea Lord 1927–1930
- Sir Charles Madden, 2nd Baronet (1906–2001), son of the 1st Baronet, also a Royal Navy admiral, Commander-in-Chief of the Home Fleet 1963–1965
- Sir Charles Jonathan Madden, 4th Baronet (born 1949) of the Madden baronets

== See also ==
- Madden baronets, of Kells, County Kilkenny
