= Thomas Madden =

Thomas Madden may refer to:

- Thomas F. Madden (born 1960), American historian
- Thomas Madden (priest) (1853–1915), Archdeacon of Liverpool
- Tommy Madden (1883–1930), baseball player
- Bunny Madden (Thomas Francis Madden, 1882–1954), baseball player
- Thomas M. Madden (1907–1976), U.S. federal judge
- Thomas J. Madden (born 1938), American author and public relations expert
- Thomas More Madden (1838–1902), Irish physician and writer
- Tommy Madden (soccer) (born 1997), American soccer player
