= Patrick Flannery =

Patrick Flannery may refer to:

- Paddy Flannery (born 1976), Scottish footballer
- Patrick Flannery (piper) (died 1855), Irish piper
- Patrick Flannery (politician), Kentucky politician

== See also ==
- Patrick Flanery, American author and academic
