= Conor Burke (hurler) =

Irish hurler

Personal information
- Native name: Conchúr de Búrca (Irish)
- Born: 1998 (age 27–28) Marino, Dublin, Ireland
- Occupation: Student

Sport
- Sport: Hurling
- Position: Midfield
Club
- Years: Club
- St. Vincent's
Club titles
- Dublin titles: 0
College
- Years: College
- DCU Dóchas Éireann
College titles
- Fitzgibbon titles: 0
Inter-county
- Years: County
- 2017-present: Dublin
Inter-county titles
- Leinster titles: 0
- All-Irelands: 0
- NHL: 0
- All Stars: 0

Conor Burke (born 1998) is an Irish hurler who plays for Dublin Senior Championship club St. Vincent's and at inter-county level with the Dublin senior hurling team. He currently lines out at midfield.

== Career ==
A member of the St. Vincent's club in Marino, Burke first came to prominence on the inter-county scene on the Dublin minor team that won the 2016 Leinster Championship. He subsequently progressed onto the Dublin under-21 team as well as lining out with DCU Dóchas Éireann in the Fitzgibbon Cup. Burke was just out of the minor grade when he was added to the Dublin senior hurling team, making his debut during the 2017 Walsh Cup.

== Honours ==
Dublin

- Leinster Minor Hurling Championship: 2016
- Gaa/Gpa hurler of the month June 2025. https://www.gaa.ie/article/conor-burke-hopeful-dublin-can-make-further-progress-next-year
- All Star nominee 2024 and 2025.
