= HMS Battleaxe (D118) =

Weapon-class destroyer

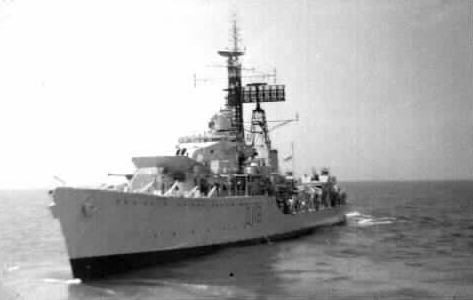
- HMS Battleaxe

History

United Kingdom
- Name: HMS Battleaxe
- Ordered: 7 April 1943
- Builder: Yarrow Shipbuilders
- Laid down: 22 April 1944
- Launched: 12 June 1945
- Commissioned: 23 October 1947
- Identification: Pennant number G18/D118
- Fate: Arrived at Blyth for scrapping on 20 October 1964

General characteristics
- Class & type: Weapon-class destroyer
- Displacement: 1,980 tons standard
- Length: 365 ft (111 m)
- Beam: 38 ft (12 m)
- Armament: 6 x 4-inch DP guns; 6 x 40 mm Bofors AA Guns; 10 x 21 inch (533 mm) torpedo tubes; 2 x Squid ASW mortars

HMS Battleaxe was a Weapon-class destroyer of the Royal Navy, completed just after the Second World War.

== Construction ==
Battleaxe was one of 19 Weapon-class destroyers ordered as part of the Royal Navy's 1943 War Programme. The Weapons were intended to be built in shipyards where the larger Battle class could not be built, but still mounting the heavy anti-aircraft armament and modern fire-control which war experience had shown to be necessary. As designed, the Weapons were to be armed by six 4-in guns in three twin turrets, two forward and one aft, with radar direction, with a close-in anti-aircraft armament of six 40-mm Bofors guns. Ten 21 inch (533 mm) torpedo tubes were carried in two quintuple mounts, while up to 150 depth charges could be carried.

Battleaxe was laid down at Yarrows Scotstoun shipyard in Glasgow on 22 April 1944, and was launched on 12 June 1945. The end of the Second World War meant that most of the class were cancelled, with the remaining four ships, including Battleaxe having their armament fit revised to improve their anti-submarine capability. One of the ships' four inch mounts (in Battleaxe's case the superimposed forward B-mount, leaving one turret forward and another aft) was removed to allow the fitting of two Squid anti-submarine mortars, while the conventional depth charge armament was also removed. Battleaxe commissioned on 23 October 1947, the first of the four Weapon class to be completed.

== Operations ==
On commissioning, Battleaxe served as the leader of the Home Fleet's 6th Destroyer Flotilla, which consisted of the four Weapon class ships. Between 1946 and 1949 it was commanded by Charles Madden. It remained part of the 6th Flotilla through the rest of the 1940s and well into the 1950s, deploying to form part of the Mediterranean Fleet from April 1955 to March 1956. In 1953 she took part in the Fleet Review to celebrate the Coronation of Queen Elizabeth II. Later in 1956, Battleaxe was laid off into the reserve.

In 1957, the four Weapon-class destroyers were selected for conversion to Radar pickets with Battleaxe being converted at Rosyth Dockyard. The ship's torpedo tubes were removed to allow the fitting of an additional lattice mast carrying a Type 965 long-range air-search radar, with deckhouses built to house the radar equipment and operators. Battleaxe's Squid mortars were swapped with the aft mounted 4-inch turret, while a more modern fire control system for the ship's guns were fitted.

Battleaxe recommissioned in February 1959, joining the 2nd Destroyer Squadron based in the Mediterranean, serving there until April 1960 when it transferred back to the British Isles to join the 5th Destroyer Squadron. Duties included fishery protection patrols. On 25 August 1960, she was carrying out steam trials while moored alongside the minelayer Apollo at Portsmouth, when steam was let into the ship's turbines, driving the ship forward and breaking Apollo's mooring lines. Apollo then collided with the frigate Wakeful, which also broke free from her moorings and struck the Caisson at the entrance to a dock. Apollo's stem was damaged, while Wakeful suffered buckled plates from the impact by Apollo and a badly damaged bow from the collision with the caisson. On the night of 18/19 September 1960, Battleaxe was berthed at Londonderry Port undergoing minor repairs before being due to depart for an exercise the next morning, when one of her crew cut the feeder cable to the Type 965 radar, putting the radar system out of order. Battleaxe put into Rosyth Dockyard to repair the radar. The crewman responsible was tried and pleaded guilty to wilfully damaging the ship's radar, and was sentenced to 18 months imprisonment and dismissed with disgrace from the Navy.

On 1 August 1962, during a night-time exercise in the Firth of Clyde, Battleaxe collided with the Type 15 frigate Ursa. The damage to Battleaxe was considered not economical to repair and the ship was laid up at Rosyth to await disposal. Battleaxe arrived at Blyth Shipbuilding Company for scrapping on 20 October 1964. Three of Battleaxe's crew, including her commanding officer, were officially reprimanded by Courts Martial following the accident.

== Publications ==
- Blackman, Raymond V. B. (1960). Jane's Fighting Ships 1960–61. London: Sampson Low, Marston & Co. Ltd.
- Colledge, J. J.; Warlow, Ben (2006) [1969]. Ships of the Royal Navy: The Complete Record of All Fighting Ships of the Royal Navy from the 15th Century to the Present (3rd Rev ed.). London: Chatham Publishing. ISBN 978-1-86176-281-8. OCLC 67375475.
- Critchley, Mike (1982). British Warships Since 1945: Part 3: Destroyers. Liskeard, UK: Maritime Books. ISBN 0-9506323-9-2.
- Gardiner, Robert; Chesneau, Roger (1980). Conway's All the World's Fighting Ships 1922–1946. London: Conway Maritime Press. ISBN 0-85177-146-7.
- Gardiner, Robert; Chumbley, Stephen (1995). Conway's All the World's Fighting Ships 1947–1995. Annapolis, Maryland, USA: Naval Institute Press. ISBN 1-55750-132-7.
- Marriott, Leo (1989). Royal Navy Destroyers Since 1945. Ian Allan Ltd. ISBN 0-7110-1817-0.
- Whitley, M. J. (2000). Destroyers of the Second World War: An International Encyclopedia. London: Cassell & Co. ISBN 1-85409-521-8.
