= Paul Crummey =

Irish hurler

Personal information
- Native name: Pól Ó Cromtha (Irish)
- Born: 1997 (age 28–29) Lucan, Dublin, Ireland
- Occupation: Veterinarian

Sport
- Sport: Hurling
- Position: Left wing-forward
Club
- Years: Club
- Lucan Sarsfields
Club titles
- Dublin titles: 0
College
- Years: College
- University College Dublin
College titles
- Fitzgibbon titles: 0
Inter-county
- Years: County
- 2018-present: Dublin
Inter-county titles
- Leinster titles: 0
- All-Irelands: 0
- NHL: 0
- All Stars: 0

Paul Crummey (born 1997) is an Irish hurler who plays for Dublin Senior Championship club Lucan Sarsfields and at inter-county level with the Dublin senior hurling team. He currently lines out as a wing-forward.

== Career ==
A member of the Lucan Sarsfields club, Crummey first came to prominence on the inter-county scene at underage levels with the Dublin under-21 team. He simultaneously lined out with University College Dublin in the Fitzgibbon Cup. Crummey was added to the Dublin senior hurling team alongside his brother Chris Crummey in 2019.
