= Frank Madden =

Frank Madden may refer to:

- Frank Madden (baseball) (1892–1952), American baseball player
- Frank Madden (politician) (1847–1921), Irish-born Australian politician

== See also ==
- Madden (name)
