= James Madden =

James Madden may refer to:

- J. Lester Madden (1909–1984), American figure skater
- James Loomis Madden (1892–1972), acting chancellor of New York University, 1951–1952
- Jim Madden (born 1958), Australian politician
- James Madden (footballer) (born 1999), Irish Australian rules footballer for the Brisbane Lions
- James Madden (hurler) (born 1996), player for Dublin
