= David Madden =

David Madden may refer to:

- David Madden (novelist) (born 1933), American novelist
- David Madden (musician) (born 1943), Jamaican reggae trumpeter / singer / songwriter
- David Madden (entrepreneur), Australian entrepreneur associated with progressive causes
- David M. Madden (1954–2019), former mayor of Weymouth, Massachusetts
- Dave Madden (1931–2014), Canadian actor
- David Madden (politician) (1880–1955), Irish Fine Gael politician from Limerick
- David Madden (footballer) (born 1963), retired professional footballer
- David Madden (Jeopardy! contestant) (born 1981), American game show contestant and academic competition organizer
- David Madden (executive) (born 1955), American media producer and executive
- Sir David Madden (diplomat), British diplomat, British Ambassador to Greece
