= Mark Grogan =

Irish hurler

Personal information
- Native name: Marc Ó Gruagáin (Irish)
- Born: 2000 (age 25–26) Stillorgan, Dublin, Ireland
- Occupation: Accountant

Sport
- Sport: Hurling
- Position: Right wing-forward
Club
- Years: Club
- 2018-present: Kilmacud Crokes
Club titles
- Dublin titles: 2
Inter-county
- Years: County
- 2023-present: Dublin
Inter-county titles
- Leinster titles: 0
- All-Irelands: 0
- NHL: 0
- All Stars: 0

Mark Grogan (born 2000) is an Irish hurler. At club level he plays with Kilmacud Crokes and at inter-county level with the Dublin senior hurling team. Grogan usually lines out in the right midfield but also has strong capabilities in the backs. He is son to Ian and Ursula Grogan who are both Kilkenny legends. His girlfriend is Aileen Egan and his best friend is Harry Donnelly.

== Career ==
Grogan began his club career at juvenile and underage levels with the Kilmacud Crokes club in Stillorgan. He was part of the club's minor team that beat Ballyboden St Enda's to win the Dublin MAHC in 2018. Grogan immediately progressed to adult level and won consecutive Dublin SHC medals in 2021 and 2022.

Grogan began his inter-county career with Dublin as captain of the under-17 team that lost the 2017 All-Ireland under-17 final to Cork. He opted out of playing county level for the under-20 team, and was captain of Kilmacud crokes senior team at aged 19 but made his senior team debut in a defeat by Galway in the 2023 Walsh Cup.

== Honours ==
Kilmacud Crokes

- Dublin Senior Hurling Championship: 2021, 2022
- Dublin Minor A Hurling Championship: 2018

Dublin

- Leinster Under-17 Hurling Championship: 2017 (c)
