= Jake Malone =

Irish hurler

Personal information
- Native name: Seán Ó Maoileoin (Irish)
- Born: 1996 (age 29–30) Blackrock, County Dublin, Ireland
- Occupation: Business consultant

Sport
- Sport: Hurling
- Position: Midfield
Club
- Years: Club
- Cuala
Club titles
- Dublin titles: 5
- Leinster titles: 2
- All-Ireland Titles: 2
College
- Years: College
- University College Dublin
College titles
- Fitzgibbon titles: 0
Inter-county*
Years	County	Apps (scores)
2017-present	Dublin	11 (1-04)
Inter-county titles
- Leinster titles: 0
- All-Irelands: 0
- NHL: 0
- All Stars: 0
- *Inter County team apps and scores correct as of 12:11, 5 July 2021.

Jake Malone (born 1996) is an Irish hurler who plays for Dublin Senior Championship club Cuala and at inter-county level with the Dublin senior hurling team. He currently lines out as a midfielder.

== Career ==
Malone first came to prominence at club level during a golden age for the Cuala club. He lined out at midfield when the club won consecutive All-Ireland Club Championship titles in 2017 and 2018. He has also won two Leinster Club Championship titles and five County Club Championship titles. Malone first lined out at inter-county level with the Dublin minor team in 2014, before winning a Leinster Championship medal with the under-21 team in 2016. He made his debut with the Dublin senior hurling team in 2017.

== Career statistics ==
As of 3 July 2021.

Team	Year	National League			Leinster		All-Ireland		Total	
Team	Year	Division	Apps	Score	Apps	Score	Apps	Score	Apps	Score
Dublin	2017	Division 1A	1	0-00	1	0-00	0	0-00	2	0-00
Dublin	2018	Division 1B	0	0-00	4	1-04	—		4	1-04
Dublin	2019	Division 1B	7	0-01	3	0-00	0	0-00	10	0-01
Dublin	2020	Division 1B	5	0-02	1	0-00	1	0-00	7	0-02
Dublin	2021	Division 1B	4	0-02	1	0-00	0	0-00	5	0-02
Total			17	0-05	10	1-04	1	0-00	28	1-09

== Honours ==
Cuala

- All-Ireland Senior Club Hurling Championship: 2017, 2018
- Leinster Senior Club Hurling Championship: 2016, 2017
- Dublin Senior Hurling Championship: 2015, 2016, 2017, 2019, 2020

Dublin

- Leinster Under-21 Hurling Championship: 2016
