= Fergal Whitely =

Irish hurler

Personal information
- Native name: Fearghal (Irish)
- Born: 1997 (age 28–29) Kilmacud, Dublin, Ireland
- Occupation: Teacher

Sport
- Sport: Hurling
- Position: Left wing-forward
Club
- Years: Club
- Kilmacud Crokes
Club titles
- Dublin titles: 1
College
- Years: College
- DCU Dóchas Éireann
College titles
- Fitzgibbon titles: 0
Inter-county*
Years	County	Apps (scores)
2017-present	Dublin	13 (2-10)
Inter-county titles
- Leinster titles: 0
- All-Irelands: 0
- NHL: 0
- All Stars: 0
- *Inter County team apps and scores correct as of 14:50, 5 July 2021.

Fergal Whitely (born 1997) is an Irish hurler who plays for Dublin Senior Championship club Kilmacud Crokes and at inter-county level with the Dublin senior hurling team. He usually lines out as a wing-forward.

== Career ==
A member of the Kilmacud Crokes club, Whitely first came to prominence on the inter-county scene as a member of the Dublin minor team that in 2015. He subsequently lined out with the Dublin under-21 team as well as with DCU Dóchas Éireann in the Fitzgibbon Cup. Whitely was later added to the Dublin senior hurling team, making his debut during the 2017 National Hurling League.

== Career statistics ==
As of 3 July 2021

Team	Year	National League			Leinster		All-Ireland		Total	
Team	Year	Division	Apps	Score	Apps	Score	Apps	Score	Apps	Score
Dublin	2017	Division 1A	3	0-00	1	0-01	2	0-02	6	0-03
Dublin	2018	Division 1B	4	0-04	3	2-01	—		7	2-05
Dublin	2019	Division 1B	7	0-04	4	0-05	1	0-00	12	0-09
Dublin	2020	Division 1B	2	0-00	1	0-00	0	0-00	3	0-00
Dublin	2021	Division 1B	3	0-02	1	0-00	0	0-00	4	0-02
Career total			19	0-10	10	2-07	3	0-02	32	2-19
