= John Madden (disambiguation) =

John Madden (1936–2021) was an American football coach and television announcer.

John Madden may also refer to:

== Government ==
- John Madden (judge) (1844–1918), Australian judge and politician
- John Madden (Tasmanian politician) (1896–1971), Australian politician
- John Madden (Irish politician) (c. 1895–1954), Irish politician
- John P. Madden, American politician, member of the New York State Assembly

== Sports ==
- John Madden (hurler) (born 1968), Irish hurling selector and player
- John Madden (ice hockey) (born 1973), Canadian ice hockey player
- John E. Madden (1856–1929), American horse trainer and thoroughbred breeder
- John H. Madden (1889–1982), American college football player and coach
- Jack Madden, Canadian basketball referee
- Johnny Madden (John William Madden, 1865–1948), Scottish footballer and football manager

== Others ==
- John Danny Madden, American singer, often abbreviated as Danny Madden
- John Madden (director) (born 1949), English director of theatre, film, television, and radio
- John Thomas Madden (1882–1948), American educator and business leader
- John Madden (priest) (died 1751), Irish dean of Kilmore
- John F. Madden (1870–1946), officer in the United States Army
- Johnathon Robert Madden (1991–2003), Canadian child murder victim

== See also ==
- Jock Madden (born 2000), Australian rugby league player
- John Madin (1924–2012), English architect
