= Cian O'Sullivan (hurler) =

Irish hurler

Personal information
- Native name: Cian Ó Súilleabháin (Irish)
- Born: 1998 (age 27–28) Castleknock, Dublin, Ireland
- Occupation: Student

Sport
- Sport: Hurling
- Position: Left corner-forward
Club
- Years: Club
- St. Brigid's
Club titles
- Dublin titles: 0
College
- Years: College
- Trinity College
College titles
- Fitzgibbon titles: 0
Inter-county*
Years	County	Apps (scores)
2016-present	Dublin	3 (1-05)
Inter-county titles
- Leinster titles: 0
- All-Irelands: 0
- NHL: 0
- All Stars: 1
- *Inter County team apps and scores correct as of 15:05, 5 July 2021.

Cian O'Sullivan (born 1998) is an Irish hurler who plays for Dublin Championship club St. Brigid's and at inter-county level with the Dublin senior hurling team. He usually lines out as a left corner-forward.

== Career ==
A member of the St. Brigid's club in Castleknock, O'Sullivan first came to prominence on the inter-county scene with the Dublin minor team that won the 2016 Leinster Minor Championship. He subsequently spent two seasons with the Dublin under-21 team, while simultaneously lining out with Trinity College in the Fitzgibbon Cup. O'Sullivan made his senior debut during the 2017 National League.

== Career statistics ==
As of league match played 3 July 2021. Championship 6 july 2025

Team	Year	National League			Leinster		All-Ireland		Total	
Team	Year	Division	Apps	Score	Apps	Score	Apps	Score	Apps	Score
Dublin	2017	Division 1A	5	0-01	0	0-00	2	1-04	7	1-05
Dublin	2018	Division 1B	1	0-00	0	0-00	—		1	0-00
Dublin	2019	Division 1B	0	0-00	0	0-00	0	0-00	0	0-00
Dublin	2020	Division 1B	0	0-00	0	0-00	0	0-00	0	0-00
Dublin	2021	Division 1B	1	0-00	1	0-01	0	0-00	2	0-01
Dublin	2022	Division 1B	0	0-00	0	0-00	0	0-00	0	0-00
Dublin	2023	Division 1B	0	0-00	4	2-08	2	1-14	6	3-22
Dublin	2024	Division 1B	0	0-00	5	1-07	0	0-00	5	1-07
Dublin	2025	Division 1B	0	0-00	5	3-14	3	2-08	8	5-22
Career total			7	0-01	15	6-30	7	5-26	23	10-57

== Honours ==
Dublin

- Leinster Minor Hurling Championship: 2016

Individual

- The Sunday Game Team of the Year (1): 2025
- All Star Award (1): 2025
