= Samuel Madden =

Samuel Madden may refer to:

- Samuel Madden (author) (1686–1765), Irish author
- Samuel Madden (computer scientist) (born 1976), American computer scientist
- Samuel Madden (priest) (1831–1891), English priest
