= Bill Madden =

Bill or William Madden may refer to:

- William Madden (piper) (fl. 1855–1857), Irish piper
- William Madden (sailor) (1843–?), U.S. Navy Medal of Honor recipient
- Billy Madden (1852–1918), American pugilist
- William V. Madden (1868–1921), American architect
- Bill Madden (footballer) (1881–1917), Australian rules footballer
- Bill Madden (soldier) (1924–1951), Australian recipient of the George Cross in the Korean War
- Bill Madden (sportswriter) (born 1946), American sportswriter
- Bill Madden (musician), American singer-songwriter
