= Dublin county hurling team =

Hurling team

Dublin
- Sport: Hurling
- Irish: Áth Cliath
- County board: Dublin GAA
- Manager: Niall Ó Ceallacháin
- Home venue(s): Parnell Park

Recent competitive record
- Current All-Ireland status: QF in 2026
- Last championship title: 1938
- Current NHL Division: 1B (2nd in 2026)
- Last league title: 2011
First colours	Second colours

The Dublin county hurling team represents Dublin in hurling and is governed by Dublin GAA, the county board of the Gaelic Athletic Association. The team competes in the three major annual inter-county competitions; the All-Ireland Senior Hurling Championship, the Leinster Senior Hurling Championship and the National Hurling League.

Dublin's home ground is Parnell Park, Donnycarney. The team's manager is Niall Ó Ceallacháin.

The team last won the Leinster Senior Championship in 2013, the All-Ireland Senior Championship in 1938 and the National League in 2011.

== History ==
Dublin won the All-Ireland Senior Hurling Championship (SHC) in 1938, defeating Waterford in the final.

Dublin played in the 1961 All-Ireland SHC final.

In the 2005 National Hurling League, Dublin experienced relegation to Division 2, while its minor side won the Leinster MHC title for the first time since 1983. In the 2006 National Hurling League, Dublin gained promotion to Division 1 after victory over Kerry in the Division 2 final. Following some indifferent displays in the 2006 All-Ireland SHC, Dublin saved its status in the top flight of hurling counties and again contested the Liam MacCarthy Cup in 2007. Though a favourite for relegation in the 2007 National Hurling League, Dublin avoided the drop by finishing in fourth position. In 2009, former Clare player Anthony Daly was appointed manager of Dublin. Under his management, Dublin contested the 2009 Leinster SHC final, but lost by two goals to Kilkenny.

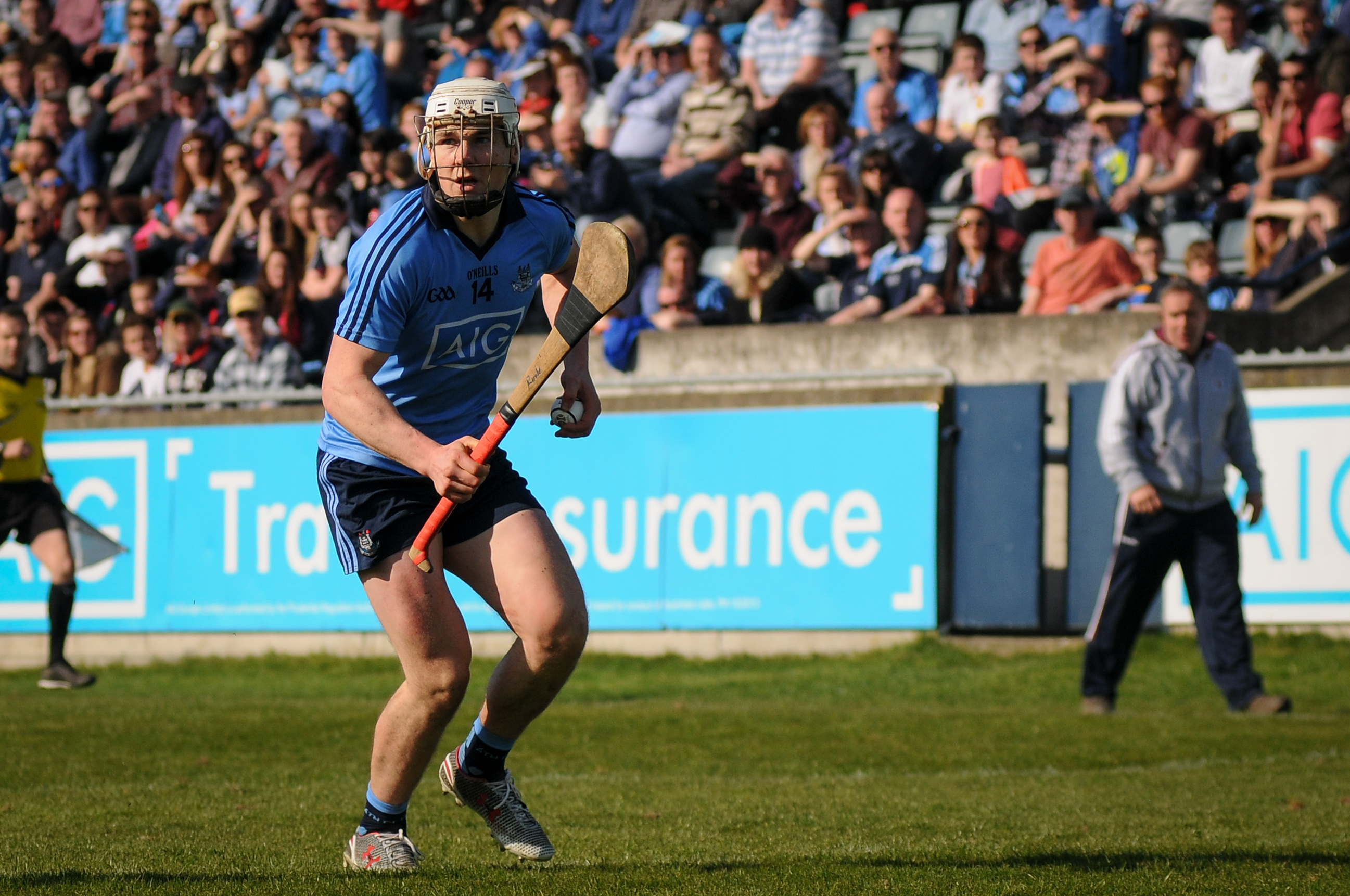
Liam Rushe in action for the Dublin hurlers against Galway in the Allianz Hurling League

Dublin won the 2011 National Hurling League title after a defeating Kilkenny by 12 points in May 2011, the team's first national title since the 1938 All-Ireland SHC.

On 7 July 2013, Dublin defeated Galway by 2–25 to 2–13 (scoring 2–21 from play) to win the Leinster SHC final. This was the first time since 1961 that Dublin had won the competition. The goalkeeper from the 1961 team presented John McCaffrey, the Dublin captain, with the Bob O'Keeffe trophy.

On 21 June 2025, Dublin defeated Limerick by 2–24 to 0–28 to reach the 2025 All-Ireland SHC semi-finals. However, Dublin then heavily lost the All-Ireland SHC semi-final to Cork.

== Support ==
Dublin's hurling team has a fervent following who travel in significant numbers to matches in the provinces. The 2000s brought a revival in the fortunes and popularity of Dublin hurling, and Dublin underage teams also had success at that time. A supporters' club, "Friends of Dublin Hurling and Camogie", offers bus trips to away matches as well as support and assistance for youth teams in the area.

=== Rivalries ===
Dublin shares rivalries with fellow provincial sides Kilkenny, Offaly and Wexford plus regular Leinster Championship guests Galway.

== Panel ==
Team as per Dublin vs Galway in round 5 of the Leinster SHC, 26 May 2024

No.	Player	Position	Club
1	Seán Brennan	Goalkeeper	Cuala
2	John Bellew	Right Corner-back	Lucan Sarsfields
3	Eoghan O'Donnell	Full-back	Whitehall Colmcille
4	Paddy Smyth (c)	Left corner-back	Clontarf
5	Chris Crummey	Right half-back	Lucan Sarsfields
6	Conor Donohoe	Centre-back	Erins Isle
7	Paddy Doyle	Left half-back	Naomh Barróg
8	Brian Hayes	Midfield	Kilmacud Crokes
9	Conor Burke	Midfield	St Vincent's
10	Danny Sutcliffe	Right half-forward	St Jude's
11	Donal Burke	Centre-forward	Na Fianna
12	Seán Currie	Left half-forward	Na Fianna
13	Fergal Whitely	Right corner-forward	Kilmacud Crokes
14	Cian O'Sullivan	Full-forward	St Brigid's
15	Ronan Hayes	Left corner-forward	Kilmacud Crokes

No.	Player	Position	Club
16	Eddie Gibbons	Goalkeeper	Kilmacud Crokes
17	James Madden	Corner back	Ballyboden St Enda's
18	Daire Gray	Wing back	Whitehall Colmcille
19	Seán Gallagher	Midfielder	Naomh Barróg
20	Darragh Power	Midfielder	Fingallians
21	Mark Grogan	Wing back	Kilmacud Crokes
22	Dara Purcell	Midfielder	Kilmacud Crokes
23	Colin Currie	Wing forward	Na Fianna
24	Paul Crummey	Wing forward	Lucan Sarsfields
25	Jake Malone	Midfielder	Cuala
26	Liam Murphy	Corner forward	Cuala

^{INJ} Player has had an injury which has affected recent involvement with the county team.
^{RET} Player has since retired from the county team.
^{WD} Player has since withdrawn from the county team due to a non-injury issue.

== Management team ==
Appointed on a three-year term in September 2024:

- Manager: Niall Ó Ceallacháin
- Backroom: David Curtin, Donal McGovern, Nigel O'Hara

== Managerial history ==
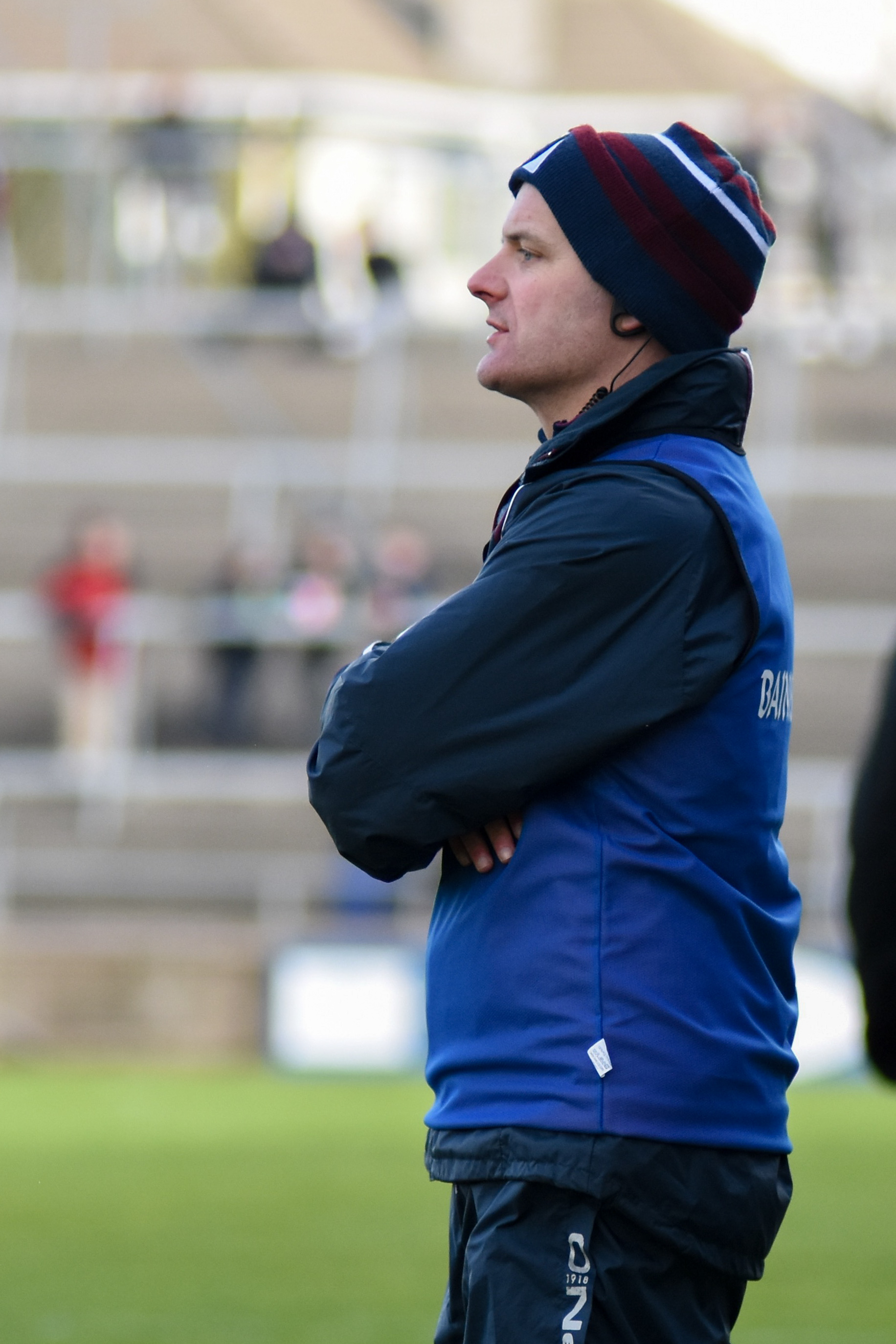
Micheál Donoghue, pictured here while in charge of Galway in 2016, was Dublin manager between 2022 and 2024.

Key
*	Interim manager

Dates	Name	Origin
1982–1988	Jimmy Boggan	Crumlin
1988–1993	Lar Foley	St Vincent's
1993–1996	Jimmy Gray	Na Fianna
1996–2000	Michael O'Grady	
2001–2002	Kevin Fennelly	
2003	Marty Morris	O’Tooles
2003–2005	Humphrey Kelleher	
2005	John Bailey – Mick O'Riordan – Tommy Ryan	Interim
2005–2008	Tommy Naughton	Scoil Uí Chonaill
2008–2014	Anthony Daly	
2014–2017	Ger Cunningham	
2017–2018	Pat Gilroy	St Vincent's
2018–2022	Mattie Kenny	
2022–2024	Micheál Donoghue	
2024–	Niall Ó Ceallacháin	Na Fianna

== Players ==
=== Notable players ===
- Conal Keaney: 2001–2020

=== All Stars ===
As of 2025, Dublin has won 9 All Stars Awards (8 different players), and 1 Cú Chulainn Award in hurling.

- Cú Chulainn Awards (1):
  - 1963: Des Foley
- GAA All Stars Awards (200):
  - 1971: Mick Bermingham
  - 1990: Brian McMahon
  - 2009: Alan McCrabbe
  - 2011: Liam Rushe Gary Maguire
  - 2013: Peter Kelly, Liam Rushe^{2nd}, Danny Sutcliffe
  - 2025: Cian O'Sullivan

== Honours ==
Dublin's hurlers have failed to replicate the success of the county's football side, having won the Senior All-Ireland Hurling final on 6 occasions, most recently in 1938. In terms of All-Ireland titles, they are significantly behind hurling's big three of Kilkenny, Cork and Tipperary. Their six titles do however place them fifth in the overall winners list, jointly tied with Wexford.

Dublin have won the Leinster Championship on 24 occasions (the second highest total of any side), although they remain well behind Kilkenny, who have won the Leinster Championship 70 times.

Dublin have won the National Hurling League three times: in 1929, 1939 and 2011. This places them joint seventh (with Clare) on the overall winners list, having won 16 fewer titles than top-ranked Tipperary.

=== National ===
- All-Ireland Senior Hurling Championship
  - (gold) Winners (6): 1889, 1917, 1920, 1924, 1927, 1938
  - (silver) Runners-up (15): 1892, 1894, 1896, 1906, 1908, 1919, 1921, 1930, 1934, 1941, 1942, 1944, 1948, 1952, 1961
- National Hurling League
  - (gold) Winners (3): 1928–29, 1938–39, 2011
  - (silver) Runners-up (5): 1925–26, 1929–30, 1933–34, 1940–41, 1945–46

=== Provincial ===
- Leinster Senior Hurling Championship
  - (gold) Winners (24): 1889, 1892, 1894, 1896, 1902, 1906, 1908, 1917, 1919, 1920, 1921, 1924, 1927, 1928, 1930, 1934, 1938, 1941, 1942, 1944, 1948, 1952, 1961, 2013
  - (silver) Runners-up (38): 1888, 1893, 1895, 1898, 1899, 1900, 1903, 1904, 1905, 1907, 1910, 1911, 1913, 1915, 1918, 1922, 1923, 1925, 1932, 1933, 1939, 1940, 1943, 1945, 1946, 1947, 1954, 1959, 1963, 1964, 1990, 1991, 2009, 2011, 2014, 2021, 2024, 2026

== Fingal ==
In 2007, the GAA announced that a hurling team from Fingal (north county Dublin) would compete in parallel to the main Dublin team, to encourage hurling in an area of growing population where the game has not been strong. While players from Fingal are eligible for the main Dublin team, non-Fingal players cannot play for Fingal. The new team competed in the Nicky Rackard Cup in 2008, and the Kehoe Cup in 2009. They played in the National Hurling League up until 2016 when the Fingal Hurling project was disbanded.
