= Daire Gray =

Irish hurler

Personal information
- Native name: Daire de Grae (Irish)
- Born: 1998 (age 27–28) Whitehall, Dublin, Ireland
- Occupation: Student

Sport
- Sport: Hurling
- Position: Right wing-back
Club
- Years: Club
- Whitehall Colmcille
Club titles
- Dublin titles: 0
College
- Years: College
- DCU Dóchas Éireann
College titles
- Fitzgibbon titles: 0
Inter-county*
Years	County	Apps (scores)
2017-present	Dublin	4 (0-02)
Inter-county titles
- Leinster titles: 0
- All-Irelands: 0
- NHL: 0
- All Stars: 0
- *Inter County team apps and scores correct as of 14:50, 1 July 2021.

Daire Gray (born 1998) is an Irish hurler who plays for Dublin Senior Championship club Whitehall Colmcille and at inter-county level with the Dublin senior hurling team. He usually lines out as a wing-back. He went to Larkhill BNS and St Aidans CBS in Whitehall.

== Career ==
A member of the Whitehall Colmcille club in Whitehall, Gray first came to prominence on the inter-county scene as a member of the Dublin minor team that won the 2016 Leinster Championship. He subsequently lined out with the Dublin under-21 team as well as with DCU Dóchas Éireann in the Fitzgibbon Cup. Gray was added to the Dublin senior panel in 2017 before making his debut against Galway during the 2019 league.

== Career statistics ==
As of match played 26 June 2021.

Team	Year	National League			Leinster		All-Ireland		Total	
Team	Year	Division	Apps	Score	Apps	Score	Apps	Score	Apps	Score
Dublin	2017	Division 1A	0	0-00	0	0-00	0	0-00	0	0-00
Dublin	2018	Division 1B	0	0-00	0	0-00	—		0	0-00
Dublin	2019	Division 1B	5	0-00	1	0-00	0	0-00	6	0-00
Dublin	2020	Division 1B	5	0-03	2	0-02	1	0-00	8	0-05
Dublin	2021	Division 1B	5	0-07	1	0-00	0	0-00	6	0-07
Career total			15	0-10	4	0-02	1	0-00	20	0-12

== Honours ==
Dublin

- Leinster Minor Hurling Championship: 2016
