= Chris Madden =

Chris Madden may refer to:

- Chris Madden (ice hockey)
- Chris Madden (designer)
