= Richard Robert Madden =

Irish doctor, writer, abolitionist and historian

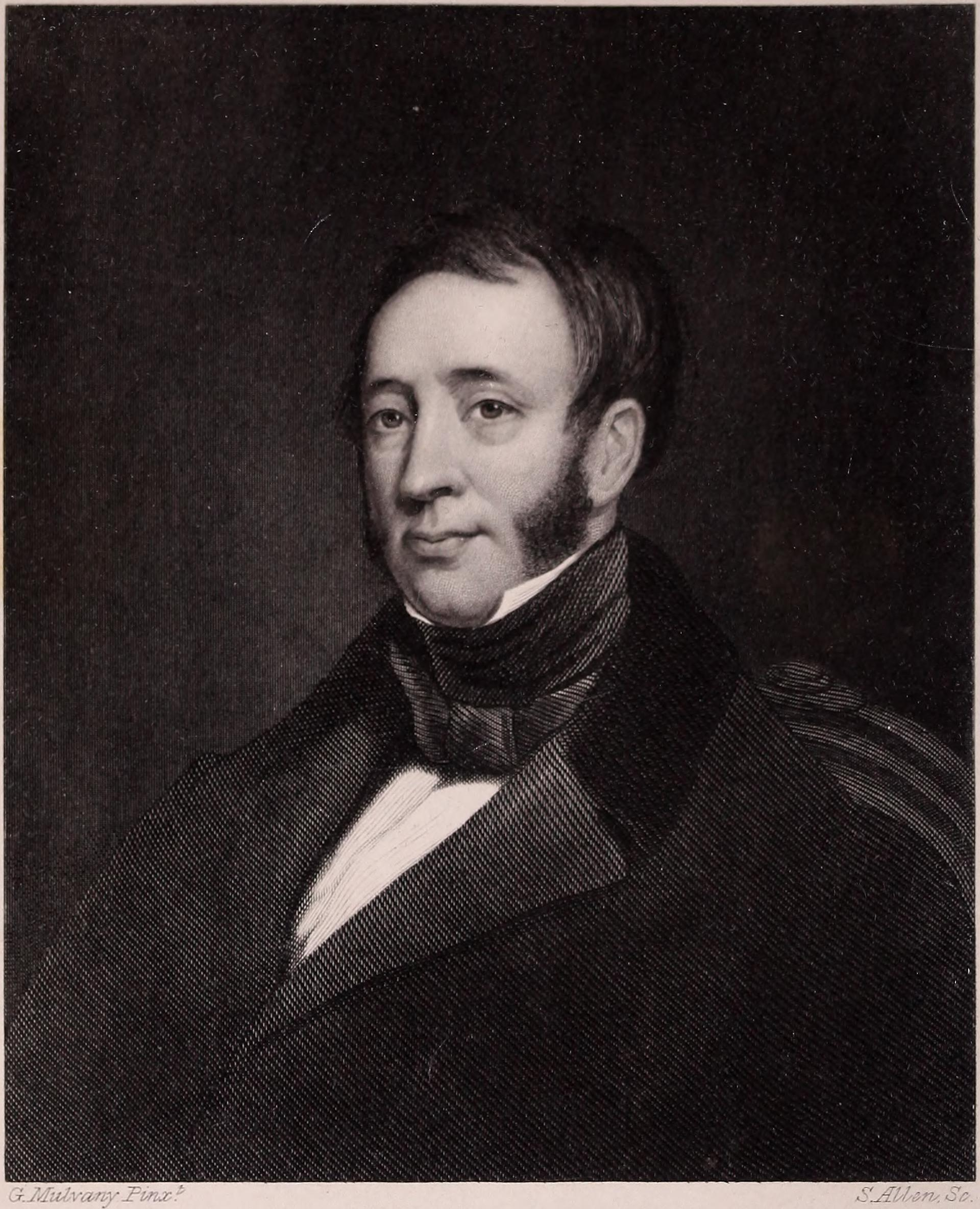
- Richard Robert Madden in 1858
- Born: 22 August 1798; Dublin
- Died: 5 February 1886 (aged 87); Booterstown, Ireland
- Known for: Doctor; Writer; Abolitionist; Historian of the United Irishmen
- Children: Thomas More Madden (son)

Richard Robert Madden (22 August 1798 – 5 February 1886) was an Irish doctor, writer, abolitionist and historian of the United Irishmen. Madden took an active role in trying to impose anti-slavery rules in Jamaica on behalf of the British government.

== Early life ==
Madden was born at Wormwood Gate Dublin on 22 August 1798 to Edward Madden, a silk manufacturer and his wife Elizabeth (born Corey) . His father had married twice and fathered twenty-one children.

Madden attended private schools and was found a medical apprenticeship in Athboy, County Meath. He studied medicine in Paris, Italy, and St George's Hospital, London. While in Naples he became acquainted with Lady Blessington and her circle. From 1824 to 1827 he was in the Levant as a journalist, and later published accounts of his travels.

In 1828 Madden married Harriet Elmslie, daughter of John Elmslie (1739–1822) of Jamaica, a slave-owner. He then for five years practised medicine in Mayfair, London.

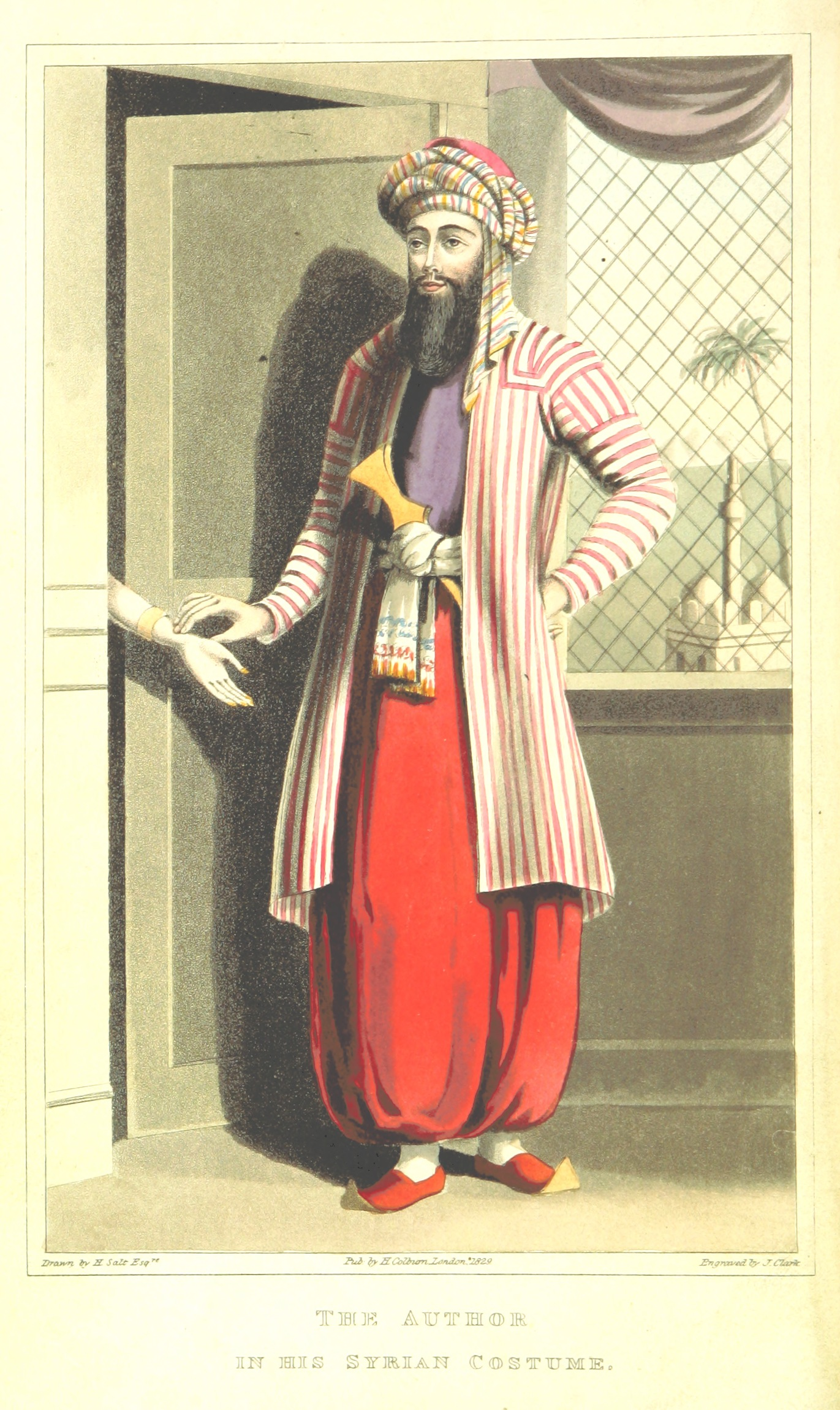
Madden undercover in Syria, exploring the Ottoman Empire

== Abolitionism and government career ==
Madden became a recruit to the abolitionist cause. The transatlantic slave trade had been illegal in the British Empire since 1807, but slavery itself remained legal.

From 1833, Madden was employed in the British civil service, first as a justice of the peace in Jamaica, where he was one of six Special Magistrates sent to oversee the eventual liberation of Jamaica's slave population, according to the terms of the 1833 Slavery Abolition Act. From 1835 he was Superintendent of the freed Africans in Havana, Cuba. In 1839 he left Cuba for New York, where he provided important evidence for the defense of the former slaves who had taken over the slave ship Amistad.

In 1840 Madden became Her Majesty's Special Commissioner of Inquiry into the British Settlements on the West Coast of Africa. His task was to investigate how the slave trade was continuing to operate on the west coast of Africa, despite the shipping of African slaves across the Atlantic Ocean now being illegal. Madden found that London-based merchants (including Whig MP Matthew Forster) were actively helping the slave traders, and that crudely disguised forms of slavery existed in all the coast settlements (he particularly condemned the actions of George Maclean, the Governor of Cape Coast Castle).

In 1847 he became the colonial secretary for Western Australia, and arrived in the colony in 1848. After receiving news of their oldest son's death back in Ireland, he and Harriet returned to Dublin in 1849. In 1850 he was named secretary of the Office for Loan Funds in Dublin.

Madden also campaigned against slavery in Cuba, speaking to the General Anti-Slavery Convention in London on the topic of slavery in Cuba.

== Death ==
Madden died at his home in Booterstown, just south of Dublin city, in 1886 and is interred in Donnybrook Cemetery.

== Published works ==
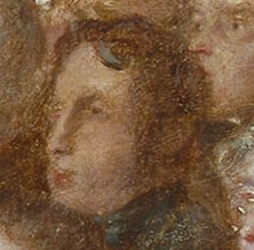
Madden at the 1840 Anti Slavery conference

Besides several travel diaries (Travels in Turkey, Egypt etc. in 1824–27, 1829, and others (1833)), his works include the historically significant book The United Irishmen, their lives and times (1842–1860, 11 Vols.), which contains numerous details on the Irish Rebellion of 1798, including testimonies collected from veteran rebels and from family members of deceased United Irishmen.

His other books include:

- The Mussulman., London, H. Colburn and R. Bentley, 1830. 3 vol. LCCN 42-44802. Available on Google Books: vol. 1, vol. 2 and vol. 3.
- The infirmities of genius illustrated by referring the anomalies in the literary character to the habits and constitutional peculiarities of men of genius., London, Saunders and Otley, 1833. 2 vol. LCCN 15-13521. Available on Google Books: vol. 1 and vol. 2.
- A Twelvemonth’s Residence in the West Indies, during the transition from slavery to apprenticeship; with incidental notice of the state of society, prospects, and natural resources of Jamaica and other islands., Philadelphia, Carey, Lea and Blanchard, 1835. 2 vol. LCCN 02-13566. Available on Google Books: vol. 1 and vol. 2.
  - New edition, under the same title: Westport, Connecticut, Negro Universities Press, 1970. ISBN 0-8371-3232-0. LCCN 70-100309
- Juan Francisco Manzano, Poems by a slave in the island of Cuba, recently liberated; translated from the Spanish, by R. R. Madden, M.D., with the history of the early life of the negro poet, written by himself; to which are prefixed two pieces descriptive of Cuban slavery and the slave-traffic, by R. R. M., London, T. Ward & Co., 1840. [9]-188 p. LCCN 01-13046
  - Note that there is a new edition, under a shorter title: The Life and Poems of a Cuban Slave : Juan Francisco Manzano, 1797–1854 / edited by Edward J. Mullen, Hamden, Connecticut : Archon Books, 1981. vii, 237 p. ISBN 0-208-01900-6. LCCN 81-3652 – Madden's name as editor and translator seems to be given inside the book.
- The Connexion between the Kingdom of Ireland and the Crown of England ... With an appendix of the Privy Council correspondence during ... 1811, 1812, 1816, 1817., Dublin : James Duffy, 1845. iii-340 p.
- The History of the Penal Laws Enacted Against Roman Catholics, London : Thomas Richardson and Son, 1847. 1 vol. (80 p.). Available on Internet Archive.
- The Life and Times of Robert Emmet, Esq., Dublin : James Duffy Publisher, 1847 (first edition), XV-VII-343 p. (available on Internet Archive. Second edition : Glasgow :Cameron, Ferguson & Co., 1902, 272 p. LCCN 04-4402.
- The island of Cuba: its resources, progress, and prospects, considered in relation especially to the influence of its prosperity on the interests of the British West India Colonies., London, C. Gilpin; [etc., etc.] 1849. xxiv-252 p. LCCN 29-23832
- The shrines and sepulchres of the Old and New World; records of pilgrimages in many lands and researches connected with the history of places remarkable for memorials of the dead, or monuments of a sacred character; including notices of the funeral customs of the principal nations, ancient and modern., London, T. C. Newby, 1851. 2 vol. LCCN 16-20251
- The Life and Martyrdom of Savonarola, illustrative of the history of church and state connexion., London, T. C. Newby, 1853. 2 vol. LCCN 06-23658. Available on Google Books: vol. 1 and vol. 2.
- The Literary Life and Correspondence of the Countess of Blessington, London, T. C. Newby, 1855. 3 vol. LCCN 13-7744. Available on Google Books: vol. 1, vol. 2 and vol. 3.
  - New edition, under the same title: New York, AMS Press, 1973. 3 vol. ISBN 0-404-07720-X.
- Phantasmata; or, Illusions and fanaticisms of Protean forms, productive of great evils., London, T. C. Newby, 1857. 2 vol. LCCN 11-6864
- The Turkish Empire. In its Relations with Christianity and Civilization., London, T. C. Newby, 1862. 2 vol. LCCN 05-9240. Available on Google Books: vol. 2.
- Galileo and the Inquisition, London: Burns & Lambert; Dublin: J. Mullany, 1863. vi-210 p.
- Historical Notice of Penal Laws Against Roman Catholics: Their Operation and Relaxation During the Past Century, of Partial Measures of Relief in 1779, 1782, 1793, 1829, and of Penal Laws which Remain Unrepealed, Or Have Been Rendered More Stringent by the Latest So-called Emancipation Act., London : Thomas Richarson and Son, 1865. 241 p. Available on Internet Archive.
- The history of Irish periodical literature, from the end of the 17th to the middle of the 19th century, its origin, progress, and results; with notices of remarkable persons connected with the press in Ireland during the past two centuries., London : T. C. Newby, 1867. 2 vol. (vii-338 p. + 531 p.). Available on Google Books: vol. 1 and vol. 2.
- The memoirs (chiefly autobiographical) from 1798 to 1886 of Richard Robert Madden. Edited by his son Thomas More Madden., London, Ward & Downey, 1891. 4-328 p., LCCN 40-18630

His time in Jamaica is also noticeable for his collection of letters and autobiographical accounts of several Muslim African slaves there at the time. These accounts are dealt with in his two-volume memoir, A Twelve Month's Residence in the West Indies. Some of his archives are held at McGill University in the Osler Library of the History of Medicine.

He also wrote poetry for The Nation.

== Family ==
Madden's wife was Harriet Elmslie (died 1888); they had three sons, among them Thomas More Madden. She was also the youngest of 21 children. Born in Marylebone in 1801 and baptised there into the Church of England, she was the child of John Elmslie (1739–1822), a Scot who owned hundreds of slaves on his plantations in Jamaica, and his wife Jane Wallace (1760 – 1801). Both Harriet's parents were of Quaker stock, but while living in Cuba she converted to Roman Catholicism.

== Bibliography ==
- Beiner, Guy (2007). Remembering the Year of the French: Irish Folk History and Social Memory. Madison: University of Wisconsin Press. ISBN 978-0-299-21824-9.
- Beiner, Guy (2018). Forgetful Remembrance: Social Forgetting and Vernacular Historiography. Oxford: Oxford University Press. ISBN 9780198749356.
- Gera Burton, Ambivalence and the postcolonial subject : the strategic alliance of Juan Francisco Manzano and Richard Robert Madden, New York : Peter Lang, 2004, xii-144 p., ISBN 0-8204-7058-9, LCCN 2003-19581
- Christopher Keniry, An Irish Doctor in the Caribbean, Richard Robert Madden's relationship with the island of Jamaica, Limerick : 2014, available from Mary Immaculate College Library.
