= Owen Madden =

Owen Madden may refer to:

- Owen Madden (footballer) (1916–1991), Irish footballer
- Owney Madden (1891–1965), Owen Victor Madden, Prohibition gangster in Manhattan
