= Patrick Flannery (piper) =

Patrick Flannery (died 1855, New York) was an Irish piper.

Flannery was a native of Aughrim, County Galway, four miles west of Ballinasloe town. Being blind, he was given the uilleann pipes as a means of earning a living.

The lament The Battle of Aughrim (commemorating the Battle of Aughrim which occurred in his home village in July 1691, was his signature tune. He taught it to his pupil, John Coughlan, and his nephew, William Madden of Ballinasloe.

He emigrated to New York City in 1845 with the Coughlan family and his nephew, William, where he died in 1855. According to O'Neill

"He was well along in years when he came to America, about 1845 and as he had no family, he lived for years with Mr. James Quinn in New York City. Money was showered on him as he played in the streets, so keen was the appreciation of his wonderful music, which we can well believe was voluminous as well as melodious.

Flannery died while playing The Bucks of Oranmore before an audience on the streets of Brooklyn in 1855. He had no family, and was survived by his nephew.

O'Neill said of his pipes:

"Concerning his splendid instrument the statement of Michael Egan to Mr. Burke is of unique interest: "I made his pipes in Liverpool. I made him a good instrument, and the right man got it. It made a great name for him and also for me. Until I made Flannery's pipes, there was no more thought of my pipemaking than there was of Michael Mannion's of Liverpool, or Maurice Coyne's of Dublin." The renowned piper had lived at least ten years in America, and taking into consideration his advanced age on arrival, we can safely assume that his birth may be dated a score or so years back into the eighteenth century. Flannery's grand set of pipes, in which Mr. Egan, their maker, took so much pride, became the property of Mr. Quinn, his friend, who honored the old minstrel with a decent burial. Ald McNurney, into whose hands they passed subsequently, found them too large for convenience, so he traded them for a more suitable instrument to Bernard Delaney, who can wake the echoes with them again, although they are far below modern concert pitch.
