= William Madden (piper) =

William Madden (fl. 1855–57), was an Irish piper.

Next to nothing is known of Madden. He was a descendant of the Ó Madadhan family of Síol Anmchadha, and was born in Ballinasloe, County Galway. His uncle was "the renowned piper Patrick Flannery (piper) (died New York, 1855). After the latter's death, both he and John Coughlan (piper) visited Ireland for two years before returning to New York."

O'Neill states that "we are told that this piper was a great performer, excelled only by William Connolly." Unlike most pipers, Madden was not blind;

"necessity was not the motive for his choice of a profession, for all his faculties were unimpaired. The predilection for music not infrequently proves irresistible, and where social position or some luerative calling presents no hindrance or restraint, the profession of wandering musician is taken up as an agreeable means of obtaining a livelihood."

== See also ==
- Paddy Conneely (died 1851)
- Patsy Touhey
- Martin O'Reilly (1829–1904)
