= John H. Madden =

American football player and coach (1889–1982)

Biographical details
- Born: February 26, 1889; Binghamton, New York, U.S.
- Died: June 9, 1982 (aged 93); Longmeadow, Massachusetts, U.S.

Playing career
- 1908–1911: Amherst
- Position: End

Coaching career (HC unless noted)
- 1914: Catholic

Head coaching record
- Overall: 0–6–1

John Harrison Madden (February 26, 1889 – June 9, 1982) was an American college football player and coach who played at Amherst College and coached at the Catholic University of America. He went on to have a legal career in Springfield, Massachusetts.

== Early life ==
Madden was born in Binghamton, New York on February 26, 1889, to John J. and Margaret (Sullivan) Madden. His father was an engineer from the Delaware and Hudson Railway. Madden graduated from Binghamton High School and the Mercersburg Academy.

== Football ==
Madden played left end for the Amherst football team and was known for his drop kicking. On November 21, 1908, he scored the only points (a four-point field goal) in Amherst's annual rivalry game against Williams. He was elected captain of the 1911 Amherst football team.

Madden graduated in 1912 and moved to Washington, D.C. to continue his studies. In 1914, he was named head coach of the Catholic University football team. Catholic went 0–6–1 in their only season under Madden.

From 1920 to 1938, Madden was a college football official.

== Head coaching record ==
Year	Team	Overall	Conference	Standing	Bowl/playoffs
Catholic University Red and Black (Independent) (1914)
1914	Catholic University	0–6–1			
Catholic University:		0–6–1			
Total:		0–6–1			

== Legal career ==
Madden graduated from Georgetown Law School in 1915 and was admitted to the bar in Springfield, Massachusetts that same year. His legal career was interrupted by World War I. He was a lieutenant in the 302nd Infantry Division from May 1917 to July 1919 and served overseas in France from July 1918 to July 1919. From 1921 to 1925, he was the prosecuting attorney for the city of Springfield. Madden was active in the Republican Party and was chairman of the Springfield Republican city committee in the 1930s.

== Personal life ==
In December 1917, Madden married Margaret McCarthy in Middletown, Connecticut. They had two children – John Jr. and Margaret. Margaret Madden died in 1961. In 1970, Madden moved to a nursing home in Longmeadow, Massachusetts. He died there on June 9, 1982.
