= Michael Madden =

Michael' or Mike Madden may refer to:

- Michael Madden (Medal of Honor) (1841–1920), U.S. Army soldier and Medal of Honor recipient
- Mickey Madden (born 1979), American musician with Maroon 5
- Mike Madden (baseball) (born 1957), American former baseball player
- Mike Madden (politician) (born 1943), American politician
- Mick Madden (Australian footballer) (1882–1943), Australian rules footballer
- Mick Madden (rugby union) (1929–2012), Irish rugby union player

== See also ==
- Mike Maden, American novelist
