= James Madden (hurler) =

Irish hurler

Personal information
- Native name: Séamus Ó Maidáin (Irish)
- Born: 1996 (age 29–30) Ballyboden, Dublin, Ireland
- Occupation: Bank official

Sport
- Sport: Hurling
- Position: Right wing-back
Club
- Years: Club
- Ballyboden St. Enda's
Club titles
- Dublin titles: 1
College
- Years: College
- University College Dublin
College titles
- Fitzgibbon titles: 0
Inter-county
- Years: County
- 2016-present: Dublin
Inter-county titles
- Leinster titles: 0
- All-Irelands: 0
- NHL: 0
- All Stars: 0

James Madden (born 1996) is an Irish hurler who plays for Dublin Senior Championship club Ballyboden St. Enda's and at inter-county level with the Dublin senior hurling team. He usually lines out as a wing-back.

== Career ==
Madden joined the Ballyboden St. Enda's club at a young age and played in all grades before eventually joining the club's top adult team. He was at left wing-back when Ballyboden won the County Championship in 2018. Madden first came to prominence on the inter-county scene as a member of the Dublin under-21 team that won the Leinster Under-21 Championship title in 2016, while simultaneously lining out with University College Dublin in the Fitzgibbon Cup. He joined the Dublin senior hurling team in 2016.

== Honours ==
Ballyboden St. Enda's

- Dublin Senior Hurling Championship: 2018

Dublin

- Leinster Under-21 Hurling Championship: 2016
