= Claire Madden =

Irish librarian, feminist and political activist

- Born: Kathleen May Delacheroise Madden; 14 October 1905; Boley House, Coolattin, County Wicklow
- Died: 15 October 1998 (aged 93); London, England
- Occupation: librarian
- Known for: feminist and political activism

Claire Madden (14 October 1905 – 15 October 1998) was an Irish librarian, feminist and political activist.

== Early life ==
Claire Madden was born Kathleen May Delacheroise Madden at Boley House, Coolattin, County Wicklow on 14 October 1905. She was the eldest daughter and second child of teachers Thomas and May Madden (née Glynn). She had an older brother, Tom, and younger sister, Mabel Anne Constance. This was her father's second marriage, and Madden had 7 older half siblings who appear to have cut off contact with their father. She was raised Protestant, but converted to Catholicism later in life, along with her interest in the Irish language and studying Irish history. The family lived in Galway, before moving to Stockport, Cheshire, where her parents ran a small private school. Madden and her two siblings were educated by their parents, with emphasis on the classics and music.

== Career ==
Madden worked for a number of years in a public library as a librarian in Stockport. She moved to London with her mother and sister, working at the London Library Service at Willesden going on to become a branch manager. She excelled in her profession, going on to become a fellow of the Royal College of Librarians. She was a scholar and book collector, with her own library holding a large amount of material relating to classical, Irish and literary subjects.

She was an Irish nationalist, and a sympathiser with Sinn Féin from the 1920s. She became a member of the Communist Party of Great Britain (CPGB) in the 1930s, as well as a number of feminist organisations. She followed the Six Point Group's principles from the 1930s. Madden became pregnant in 1938, and travelled to Dublin to stay with a friend until the birth of her daughter Etain on 8 January 1939. From the 1940s Madden became more involved with the CPGB and became the secretary of the Six Point Group.

Madden resigned from the library service when a less qualified man was promoted ahead of her. She took up the role of librarian at the Daily Worker, a position she held until the 1960s. Continuing her work with the Six Point Group, she oversaw a number of publications, statements and letters to the press. Towards the end of the 1940s, Madden became interested in the "coupled vote", an idea promoted by George Bernard Shaw. Such a vote involved couples of candidates of a man and a woman, rather than individuals, resulting in gender equality in parliament. Madden exchanged letters with Shaw on the topic, and he encouraged her to publish a pamphlet on the subject. The pamphlet, published by the Six Point Group, is quoted at length in Dora Russell's autobiography, and in a preface to one of Shaw's plays.

Madden led a number of CPGB delegations to Russia in the 1950s and 1960s. She visited and travelled around Ireland extensively, going on to buy a cottage in Galway city. She became an active member of the Connolly Association, supported C. Desmond Greaves, and was a member of Sinn Féin. She vote articles for An Phoblacht, particularly on the topic of Irish unity, as well on feminist critique of Irish issues, and studies of the status of women in ancient Irish history. Informed by this study, she followed the Irish tradition of women not taking their husband's surname after marriage.

== Later life ==
Madden lived at 75 Bedford Road, East Finchley until her death on 15 October 1998. The Women's Library, London, holds Madden's correspondence along with the records of the Six Point Group. Madden outlived her daughter, and donated her collection of prints to what would become the Irish Museum of Modern Art in 1989.
