= Judge Madden =

Judge Madden may refer to:

- Dodgson Hamilton Madden (1840–1928), judge of the Irish High Court
- J. Warren Madden (1890–1972), judge of the United States Court of Claims
- John Madden (judge) (1844–1918), Australian judge who became the longest-serving Chief Justice of Victoria
- Ray Madden (1892–1987), municipal judge in Omaha, Nebraska, before serving in the United States Congress
- Thomas M. Madden (1907–1976), judge of the United States District Court for the District of New Jersey
