= Samuel Madden (priest) =

Irish Anglican cleric

Samuel Tarrant Owen Madden (b Mallow, County Cork 6 September 1831 – d Cork 25 June 1891) was a nineteenth century Anglican priest.

Madden was educated at Trinity College, Dublin, graduating BA in 1854 and MA in 1861. He was ordained in 1857 and began his career with curacies at Buttevant and Cork. He was Vicar choral of Cork Cathedral from 1867 to 1869. He was Rector of St Paul, Cork from 1869 to 1875, and of Holy Trinity, Cork from 1875 to 1878. He became Precentor of Cork in 1874, and Dean in 1878. He died at The Deanery in Cork after a period of ill health.
