= David M. Madden =

American mayor (1954–2019)

1st Mayor of Weymouth, Massachusetts
- In office 2000–2008
- Preceded by: None
- Succeeded by: Susan Kay

Personal details
- Born: November 30, 1954 Weymouth, Massachusetts, U.S.
- Died: November 4, 2019 (aged 64)
- Party: Democratic
- Spouse: Helena Madden
- Children: Heather; Patrick
- Occupation: Fire chief

David M. Madden (November 30, 1954 – November 4, 2019) was a mayor of Weymouth, Massachusetts. He was born at South Shore Hospital in South Weymouth. He was married to Dr. Helena Madden and had two children, Heather and Patrick, who now both are grown and currently reside in Weymouth.

Madden joined the Weymouth Fire Department in 1977 and was eventually appointed chief in 1993. While working for the Fire Department, Madden returned to school and graduated cum laude from Boston College in 1995. In 1999, Madden was elected President of the Massachusetts Fire Chiefs Association.

In May 1999, Weymouth residents voted to change the Board of Selectmen/Town Meeting government form to the election of a Mayor and Town Council form. Madden decided to run and was elected in November as the first mayor of Weymouth. In 2003, Madden was reelected.

On July 10, 2007, David M. Madden announced he would not seek re-election.

On November 4, 2019, Madden died at the age of 64. He leaves behind the legacy of being Weymouth's first mayor.
