= Stacey Madden =

Canadian writer

Stacey Madden (born 1982) is a Canadian writer. He is the author of two novels: Poison Shy (2012) and Touching Strangers (2017). He has also written articles for the Globe and Mail, Toronto Review of Books, and Broken Pencil, among other publications. He was born and raised in eastern Toronto, where he still lives as of 2019. He has a BA in English from the University of Toronto and an MFA in creative writing from the University of Guelph.

== Reviews ==
Julia Cooper reviewed Poison Shy for the Toronto Review of Books, concluding that the book "...attempts an existential mapping of desire and revulsion. If it does not quite succeed as a portrait of the modern day Kafkaesque, it nonetheless reminds us of the uglier faces of desire and the painful process of self-transformation." Writing in the National Post, Nicole Dixon gave the book a mixed review, criticizing Madden for his "precious writing" and concluding that the main character's "...awkwardly described encounters with his Dream Girl, his utter passivity and the story’s thin plot are not enough to tempt readers beyond Poison Shy’s first base."

Brett Josef Grubisic reviewed Touching Strangers for the Toronto Star, writing, "Despite the blood, anxiety, and expiring bodies, [Madden's] novel comes across as one-of-a-kind: black comedy grafted with zombie outbreak movie plotting and an oddball marriage-under-duress story." He concluded by describing the book as "engrossing and gross" and as "memorably B-grade." Similarly, a review of the book in Publishers Weekly concluded that "...the story has an appealing B-movie merit: sometimes gory, sometimes crude, sometimes funny, sometimes violent, and altogether engrossing".

== Books ==
- Poison Shy (ECW, 2012)
- Touching Strangers (Now or Never, 2017)
