= Anne Madden =

Anne Madden may refer to:

- Anne Madden (artist) (1932–2025), English-born Irish painter
- Anne Madden (biologist), American biologist, inventor, and science communicator
- Ann Madden, English actress and dancer
