= Thomas More Madden =

Irish physician and writer

Thomas More Madden (1838 – 14 April 1902) was an Irish physician and writer, son and biographer of Richard Robert Madden.

== Life ==
He was born at Havana, Cuba, where his father was an appointee of the British Government working on the abolition of the slave trade, according to the terms of the Slavery Abolition Act 1833. From 1835 he was Superintendent of the freed Africans there.

Madden began his medical studies in Dublin, but after qualification bad health forced him to recuperate abroad. He combined studies with stays in Montpellier and Málaga. He then travelled to Spain, North Africa and Australia. He returned to Dublin in 1868 to concentrate on midwifery and gynaecology. He became assistant Master to the Rotunda Hospital and afterwards took up the position of obstetrical physician at the Mater Hospital, Dublin.

In 1871 he organized an Irish ambulance service for the French side in the Franco-Prussian War.

He wrote a large number of books on medical topics, dealing principally with obstetrics.

In 1901 he was seriously injured in a sailing accident, and died the following year at his house in County Wicklow.
