= Paul Madden =

Paul Madden may refer to:

- Paul Madden (chemist) (born 1948), British chemist
- Paul Madden (diplomat) (born 1959), British diplomat
