= Martin Madden =

Martin Madden may refer to:

- Martin B. Madden (1855–1928), U.S. Representative from Illinois
- Martin Madden (ice hockey), Canadian former ice hockey general manager

== See also ==
- Martin Maddan (1920–1973), British politician
- Martin Madan (1726–1790), English barrister, clergyman and writer
- Martin Madan (politician) (1700–1756), groom of the bedchamber to Frederick, Prince of Wales
