= Senator Madden =

Senator Madden may refer to:

- Edward M. Madden (1818–1885), New York State Senate
- Fred H. Madden (born 1954), New Jersey State Senate
- Robert Bruce Madden (born 1944), Kansas State Senate
- William F. Madden (1897–1979), Massachusetts State Senate
