= Russell Madden =

Russell Madden may refer to:

- Russell Madden (Australian rules footballer) (1910–1966), Australian VFL player
- Russell Madden (rugby league) (1922–1987), Australian rugby league footballer
