= Etain Madden =

- Born: 8 January 1939; Dublin, Ireland
- Died: 1982 (aged 42–43)
- Known for: feminist and political activism

Etain Madden (8 January 1939 – 1982) was an Irish feminist and political activist.

== Life ==
Etain Madden was born in Dublin on 8 January 1939. She was the only daughter of Claire Madden. She studied philosophy at King's College London, when she became active in feminist and political groups. She served as secretary of the Communist Party of Britain Fulham, as well as being active in Irish nationalist and anti-Vietnam-war organisations. In the early 1970s she worked with Pat Arrowsmith with the Stop the War Committee, and took part in numerous demonstrations. At the London March of Protest against Bloody Sunday in 1972 she carried a large Irish tricolour flag. She went on to become the manager of the Housing Aid Service for Hammersmith and Fulham.

On 18 October 1968 she married Dr Fritz Arnholz, an Austrian Jewish doctor who had escaped the Nazi regime in 1939. Arnholz was born on 12 October 1897 to a wealthy merchant family, and qualified as a doctor in Berlin in 1924. After World War II, Arnholz worked in a medical practice in Fulham which he ran until his death. He was also an accomplish pianist. Just a few months before their marriage, Arnholz was diagnosed with terminal cancer. He died on 31 December 1968.

Madden was diagnosed with multiple sclerosis in April 1979. She died in 1982.

Arnholz was a collector of prints and engravings, and amassed an important collection. Following the death of Madden, her mother donated the collection of prints, the Arnholtz-Madden collection, to the institution that would become the Irish Museum of Modern Art in 1989. The collection was curated by a close friends of Madden, Janet and John Banville.
