= Edward Madden =

Edward Madden may refer to:

- Edward Madden (botanist) (1805–1856), Irish botanist
- Edward Madden (lyricist) (1878–1952), American lyricist
- Edward M. Madden (1818–1885), American politician
- Ed Madden (professor) (born 1963), American poet and professor
