= Sir Charles Madden, 2nd Baronet =

Royal Navy Admiral (1906-2001)

Admiral Sir Charles Madden Bt GCB
- Admiral Sir Charles Madden
- Born: 15 June 1906
- Died: 23 April 2001 (aged 94); Henley-on-Thames, Oxfordshire
- Military career
- Allegiance: United Kingdom
- Branch: Royal Navy
- Service years: 1920–1965
- Rank: Admiral
- Commands: Allied Commander-in-Chief Eastern Atlantic; Home Fleet; Commander-in-Chief, Plymouth; Flag Officer Malta; Chief of Naval Staff of the RNZN; 6th Destroyer Flotilla; HMS Battleaxe; HMS Emperor
- Conflicts: Arab revolt in Palestine; Second World War: Battle of Calabria; Battle of Taranto; Battle of Cape Matapan; Battle of Crete; Burma Campaign; Cold War
- Awards: Knight Grand Cross of the Order of the Bath; Mentioned in Despatches (2)

Admiral Sir Charles Edward Madden, 2nd Baronet, GCB (15 June 1906 – 23 April 2001) followed his father in a career with the Royal Navy that culminated in his serving as the Commander-in-Chief of the Home Fleet from 1963 to 1965.

A recognized expert in gunnery, Madden helped in the introduction of radar into the Royal Navy. He participated in the Battle of Calabria, the Battle of Taranto, the Battle of Cape Matapan, and the Battle of Crete during the Second World War. Following the war, Madden introduced the General List for officers which abolished many of the distinctions between the executive and other branches within the Royal Navy. He also served as the Chief of Naval Staff of the Royal New Zealand Navy.

Following his retirement from the Royal Navy, Madden served as Vice Lord-Lieutenant of Greater London from 1969 to 1981.

== Early life and family ==
Charles Edward Madden was born on 15 June 1906, the son of Admiral of the Fleet Sir Charles Madden, for whom the baronetcy was created in 1919. His mother Constance was a daughter of Sir Charles Cayzer, 1st Baronet, the distinguished shipowner, and his aunt Gwendoline had married Admiral of the Fleet John Rushworth Jellicoe when he was a captain in 1902.

=== Pre-war service ===
Madden was educated at Sandroyd School then joined the Royal Navy as a naval cadet in 1920, attending the Royal Naval College, Osborne, and Royal Naval College, Dartmouth. On leaving Dartmouth in 1923 his father presented the prizes. He then went to sea for a cruise in the battleship Thunderer to complete his initial training.

In May 1924 Midshipman Madden was appointed to the battleship Iron Duke, the flagship of the Mediterranean Fleet. He subsequently served on the heavy cruiser Kent, the flagship of the 5th Cruiser Squadron, on the China Station. Madden participated in the annual gatherings at the British-owned anchorage and island of Wei-hai-wei, visited Japan, and attended the funeral of Sun Yat-sen, the president of the Republic of China.

In 1932, Lieutenant Madden joined the battleship Queen Elizabeth as its second gunnery officer. He was subsequently appointed as the flotilla gunnery officer, on board the flagship Exmouth, while the destroyer flotilla served in the Mediterranean Sea during the Second Italo–Abyssinian War.

Newly promoted to lieutenant commander, Madden joined the cruiser Sussex as its gunnery officer in 1935. During the 1936–1939 Arab revolt in Palestine, Madden was involved in running the lightly armoured train (making it vulnerable to attack by Arab terrorists) from Haifa to Samak as well as protecting army encampments with naval field guns landed from the Sussex and light cruiser Arethusa.

Influenced by Kent’s gunnery officer, the future Admiral Sir Philip Vian, Madden joined HMS Excellent Gunnery School at Portsmouth in September 1929 and qualified as an advanced gunnery officer ("dagger"). He returned to the Experimental Department at HMS Excellent Gunnery School as First Lieutenant in 1937. During this two-year stint, he was involved in the development of gunnery fire control systems and supervised the arrangement for the funeral of Admiral Sir William Fisher, the Commander-in-Chief, Portsmouth.

=== Second World War ===
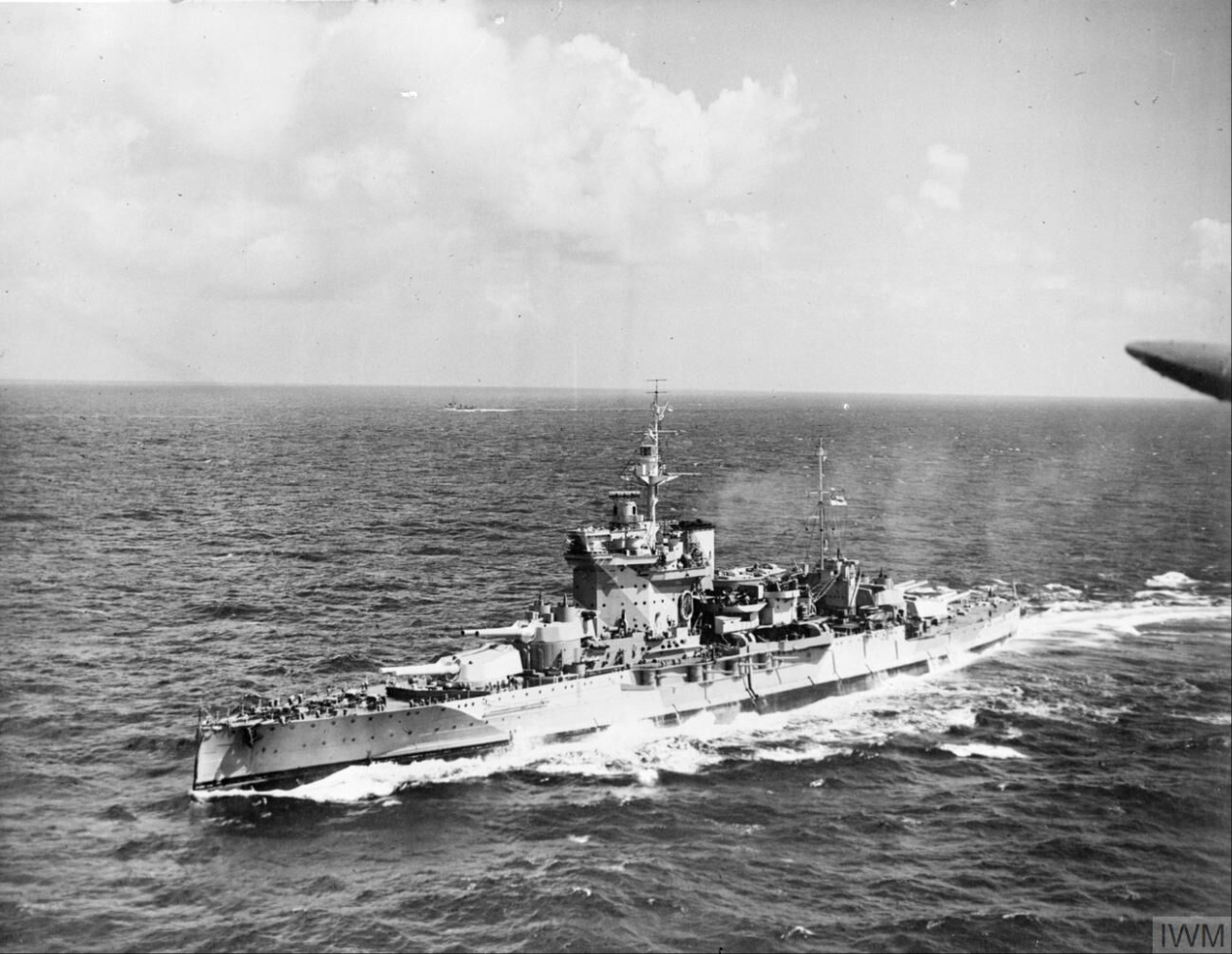
HMS Warspite

Madden was promoted to commander in 1939 and was part of the pre-commissioning crew for the new battleship King George V, which was followed by staff work involving British operations in the Baltic Sea and research on the applications of shipboard radar.

Commander Madden was appointed as the executive officer for the battleship Warspite, the flagship of the Mediterranean Fleet, in May 1940. He participated in the Battle of Calabria, the Battle of Taranto, the Battle of Cape Matapan, the Battle of Crete, and the bombardment of Tripoli during operation in the Mediterranean theatre.

Madden was cited for official praise involving his damage control, fire-fighting, and casualty-relief efforts aboard the Warspite and the cruiser Orion during the Battle of Crete. An eyewitness account described Madden as being "cool, calm and collected, at least on the outside" during the battle and its aftermath. Madden also sustained a neck injury during a German bombing attack against the Warspite on 23 June 1941.

Madden remained with the Warspite during her subsequent overhaul at the U.S. Puget Sound Naval Shipyard in Bremerton, Washington, from August to December 1941, and following the refit, as the flagship of Admiral Sir James Somerville, the Commander-in-Chief of the Eastern Fleet, operating in the Indian Ocean beginning in January 1942.

Madden undertook a two-year stint as the deputy director of the gunnery division within the Admiralty with the rank of acting captain. In late 1944, he took command of the escort aircraft carrier Emperor which, after convoy duty, operated against the Japanese bases in Burma, the Nicobars, and Sumatra as a unit of the Far East Fleet during the closing stages of the Burma campaign.

=== Cold War ===
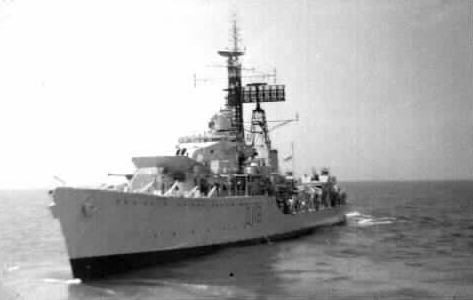
HMS Battleaxe

After the war, Madden was confirmed in the rank of captain and served as the Naval Assistant to the following First Sea Lords:

- Admiral of the Fleet Andrew B. Cunningham, 1st Viscount of Hyndhope, from 1945 to 1946
- Admiral of the Fleet Sir John Cunningham, 1946–1947

In 1947, Captain Madden took command of the destroyer Battleaxe, serving as captain (D) of the 6th Destroyer Flotilla. He subsequently attended the Imperial Defence College in 1950, and then served on the Defence Research Policy Committee that recommended that Ministry of Defence develop guided missiles to meet its future air defense needs. In 1953, Madden was appointed the Chief of Naval Staff and First Naval Member of the Royal New Zealand Navy Board with the honorary rank of commodore. The same year, he was awarded the Queen Elizabeth II Coronation Medal. In the 1955 New Zealand Queen's Birthday Honours, he was appointed a Companion of the Order of the Bath.

Madden was promoted rear admiral in 1955 and appointed deputy to Admiral Sir Charles Lambe, the Second Sea Lord. In this position, Madden introduced the General List for officers in 1956 which abolished many of the distinctions between the executive and other branches within the Royal Navy. From 1957 to 1959, Admiral Madden held the post of Flag Officer, Malta, with responsibilities for three squadrons of minesweepers, an amphibious warfare squadron, and a flotilla of submarines stationed on the island. In this capacity, he had to employ considerable diplomatic skill to maintain good relations with Dom Mintoff, the nationalistic prime minister of Malta.

Madden subsequently served as Flag Officer, Flotillas, Home (FOFH), the flag officer of destroyers and frigates in the Home Fleet from 1959 to 1961. In the Autumn of 1960, under his command, British naval forces led by the aircraft carriers Ark Royal and Hermes participated in NATO exercises against units of the U.S. Second Fleet units, which included the nuclear-powered radar-picket submarine Triton. Promoted to vice admiral in 1961, Madden served as Commander-in-Chief, Plymouth.

In 1963, Madden was appointed Commander-in-Chief Home Fleet, with the rank of admiral, a post that his father held. He concurrently served as NATO’s Allied Commander-in-Chief Eastern Atlantic, and in this capacity, Madden was instrumental in developing Standing Naval Force Atlantic as a permanent multi-national naval task force.

=== Retirement ===
After retiring, Madden served as Vice Lord-Lieutenant of Greater London from 1969 to 1981. He chaired the Royal National Mission to Deep Sea Fishermen, the National Maritime Museum, and the Standing Council of the Baronetage. Madden also served as executive secretary of a trust established to build a replica of HM Bark Endeavour for the bicentenary of James Cook's voyage of discovery to Australia in 1768, as well as serving as the naval adviser to the trust formed for the Overlord Embroidery which is on display at the D-Day Story in Southsea. He was also a member of the Council of the Sail Training Association.

Madden also continued his life-long interest in painting, and he participated in numerous collective and one-man exhibitions at such venues as the Plymouth Art Club. He was best known for landscape paintings and seascapes having been partially taught to paint as a child by William L. Wyllie. This occurred while accompanying his father, Sir Charles Madden, 1st Baronet, on board Royal Naval vessels near the end of the First World War, his father having brought his son to sea in 1918 as a means to protect him from the Spanish flu. Both Wyllie and Madden were on the British vessels escorting the German High Seas Fleet to internment at Scapa Flow.

He and his wife were involved in numerous charitable activities. His memoirs were privately printed in 1988.

Following his death, The Independent described Madden as being "a highly intelligent, thoughtful, caring and modest man. He was seldom ruffled and, like all successful admirals, was much admired by his men" whose 40-year naval career, observed the Times of London, spanned "the big-gun battleship swagger of the imperial high noon to the steely realities of the Cold War."

== Personal life ==
Madden married Olive Robins in 1942 after a two-year engagement: she died in 1989. They were survived by a daughter. Madden was succeeded in the baronetcy by his nephew, Peter John Madden, 3rd Baronet (1942–2006). Sir Peter was succeeded in turn in 2007 by his brother Charles Jonathan Madden, 4th Baronet (born 1949).

== Arms ==
Coat of arms of Sir Charles Madden, 2nd Baronet

Notes
Granted 30 October 1919 by George James Burtchaell, Deputy Ulster King of Arms.
Crest
Out of a ducal coronet Gules a falcon rising Or holding in his beak a cross crosslet fitchée of the first.
Escutcheon
Quarterly 1st Sable a falcon with his wings expanded seizing on a mallard Argent beaked and membered Or on a chief of the last a cross botonnée Gules (Madden) 2nd Or a pile engrailed Sable (Waterhouse) 3rd Sable a chevron between in chief two escallops and in base a boar's head couped Argent (Travers) 4th Sable a saltire Argent (Duckett).
Motto
Fortior Qui Se Vincit

== Bibliography ==
- Obituary by Dan van der Vat The Guardian (4 May 2001)
- Biographical Profile The Daily Telegraph (11 November 2001)
- Arthur, Max (28 April 2001). "Obituary: Admiral Sir Charles Madden". The Independent (London). Archived from the original on 25 September 2008 – via FindArticles.
- "Obituary" Times (London)
- Bernard Hallas "My Life My War: Chapter 10a – The Catastrophe of Crete" WW2 People’s War – BBC (31 May 2005)
- Bernard Hallas "My Life My War: Chapter 10b – The Catastrophe of Crete" WW2 People’s War – BBC (31 May 2005)

Military offices
| Preceded by Wilfred Brittain | Flag Officer, Malta; 1957–1959 | Succeeded by Derick Hetherington |
| Preceded by Sir Richard Onslow | Commander-in-Chief, Plymouth; 1961–1962 | Succeeded by Sir Nigel Henderson |
| Preceded by Sir Wilfrid Woods | Commander in Chief, Home Fleet; 1963–1965 | Succeeded by Sir John Frewen |
Baronetage of the United Kingdom
| Preceded by Charles Madden | Baronet (of Kells); 1935–2001 | Succeeded by Peter John Madden |
