= Alexander Madden =

Royal Navy Admiral (1895–1964)

Admiral Sir Alexander Madden KCB CBE
- Born: Alexander Cumming Gordon Madden; 21 January 1895; Stourbridge, Worcestershire, England
- Died: 21 September 1964 (aged 69); Surrey, England
- Military career
- Allegiance: United Kingdom
- Branch: Royal Navy
- Service years: 1908–1956
- Rank: Admiral
- Commands: HMS Birmingham; HMS Anson; Plymouth Command
- Conflicts: World War I World War II
- Awards: Knight Commander of the Order of the Bath; Commander of the Order of the British Empire

Admiral Sir Alexander Cumming Gordon Madden KCB CBE (21 January 1895 – 21 September 1964) was a senior Royal Navy officer who went on to be Second Sea Lord and Chief of Naval Personnel.

== Early life and education ==
Madden was born in Stourbridge, Worcestershire, the son of the Rev. Andrew Madden. He was educated at Royal Naval College, Osborne.

== Naval career ==
Madden joined the Royal Navy in 1908. He served in World War I as well as World War II. During the latter War he commanded the light cruiser HMS Birmingham from 1941. He then became Naval Assistant to the Second Sea Lord in 1942: he also served as head of the Admiralty Commission and Warrant Branch in which capacity he had the critical role of deciding who received the command of each ship in the Navy. He returned to sea as Commander of the battleship HMS Anson in 1944.

After the War he was appointed Deputy Controller of the Navy and Director of Naval Equipment and then, in 1948 he was made Flag Officer commanding 5th Cruiser Squadron and Flag Officer Second in Command for the Far East Station. In that capacity he became involved in the Amethyst Incident on the Yangtze River in China in 1949.

He was appointed Second Sea Lord and Chief of Naval Personnel in 1950 and then became Commander-in-Chief, Plymouth in 1953. He retired in 1956.

He provided the preface to the book, Walker, R.N., by Terence Robertson in 1956.

In retirement he became Chairman of the Association of Retired Naval Officers.

Military offices
Preceded by Sir Cecil Harcourt	Second Sea Lord; 1950–1953	Succeeded by Sir Guy Russell
Preceded by Sir Maurice Mansergh	Commander-in-Chief, Plymouth; 1953–1955	Succeeded by Sir Charles Pizey
