= Tommy Madden =

American baseball player

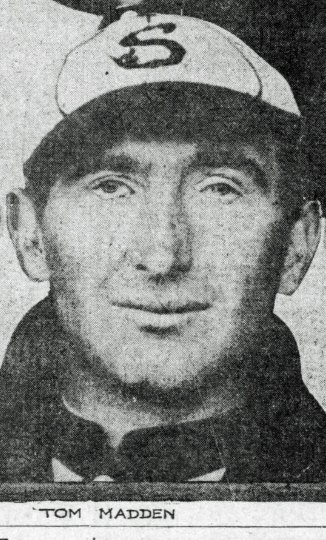
- Leftfielder
- Born: July 31, 1883; Philadelphia, Pennsylvania, U.S.
- Died: July 26, 1930 (aged 46); Philadelphia, Pennsylvania, U.S.
- Batted: Left Threw: Left

MLB debut
- September 10, 1906, for the Boston Beaneaters

Last MLB appearance
- April 25, 1910, for the New York Highlanders

MLB statistics
- Games: 5
- At bats: 16
- Hits: 4
- Stats at Baseball Reference

Teams
- Boston Beaneaters (1906); New York Highlanders (1910)

Thomas Joseph Madden (July 31, 1883 – July 26, 1930) was an American Major League Baseball outfielder. Madden played in four games for the Boston Beaneaters in the 1906 season, and for the New York Highlanders in 1910. In five career games, he had four hits in 16 at-bats.

He was born in and died in Philadelphia
