= Madden baronets =

Baronetcy in the Baronetage of the United Kingdom

The Madden Baronetcy, of Kells, County Kilkenny, is a title in the Baronetage of the United Kingdom. It was created in 1919 for the naval commander, Admiral Sir Charles Madden. He was succeeded by his son, the second Baronet, who was also a distinguished naval officer and served as Commander-in-Chief of the Home Fleet between 1963 and 1965.

== Madden baronets, of Kells (1919) ==
- Sir Charles Edward Madden, 1st Baronet (1862–1935)
- Sir Charles Edward Madden, 2nd Baronet (1906–2001)
- Sir Peter John Madden, 3rd Baronet (1942–2006)
- Sir Charles Jonathan Madden, 4th Baronet (born 1949)

The heir apparent is Samuel Charles John Madden (born 1984).

== Arms ==
Coat of arms of Madden baronets

Notes
Granted 30 October 1919 by George James Burtchaell, Deputy Ulster King of Arms.
Crest
Out of a ducal coronet Gules a falcon rising Or holding in his beak a cross crosslet fitchée of the first.
Escutcheon
Quarterly 1st Sable a falcon with his wings expanded seizing on a mallard Argent beaked and membered Or on a chief of the last a cross botonnée Gules (Madden) 2nd Or a pile engrailed Sable (Waterhouse) 3rd Sable a chevron between in chief two escallops and in base a boar's head couped Argent (Travers) 4th Sable a saltire Argent (Duckett).
Motto
Fortior Qui Se Vincit
