= Sir Charles Madden, 1st Baronet =

Royal Navy Admiral of the Fleet (1862–1935)

Admiral of the Fleet Sir Charles Madden Bt GCB OM GCVO KCMG
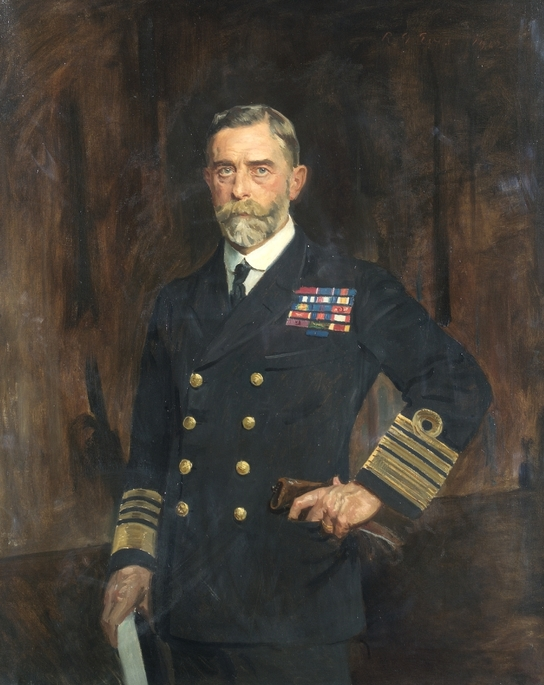
- A portrait of Madden by Reginald Grenville Eves
- Born: 5 September 1862; Gillingham, Kent
- Died: 5 June 1935 (aged 72) London
- Allegiance: United Kingdom
- Branch: Royal Navy
- Service years: 1875–1930
- Rank: Admiral of the Fleet
- Commands: First Sea Lord; Atlantic Fleet; 1st Battle Squadron; 2nd Cruiser Squadron; 3rd Cruiser Squadron; 1st Division, Home Fleet; HMS Dreadnought; HMS Good Hope; HMS Orion
- Conflicts: Anglo-Egyptian War; First World War
- Awards: Knight Grand Cross of the Order of the Bath; Member of the Order of Merit; Knight Grand Cross of the Royal Victorian Order; Knight Commander of the Order of St Michael and St George; Mentioned in Despatches

Admiral of the Fleet Sir Charles Edward Madden, 1st Baronet, GCB, OM, GCVO, KCMG, (5 September 1862 – 5 June 1935) was a Royal Navy officer who served during the First World War as Chief of the Staff to Sir John Jellicoe in the Grand Fleet from 1914 to 1916 and as Second-in-Command of the fleet under Sir David Beatty from 1916 to 1919. He was Commander-in-Chief of the Atlantic Fleet after the war and served as First Sea Lord in the late 1920s. In that role, in order to avoid an arms race, he accepted parity with the United States in the form of 50 cruisers defending his position on the basis that he only actually had 48 cruisers anyway.

== Early career ==
Born the second son of Captain John William Madden of the 4th (King's Own) Regiment and Emily Madden (née Busby), Madden joined the Royal Navy as a cadet in the training ship HMS Britannia in 1875. Promoted to midshipman he was posted to the central battery ship HMS Alexandra, flagship of Admiral Geoffrey Hornby Commander-in-Chief of the Mediterranean Fleet in 1877 and was deployed to Constantinople during the Russo-Turkish War. He transferred to the corvette HMS Ruby in the East Indies Squadron in 1880. Promoted to sub-lieutenant on 27 October 1881, he was deployed to Suez during the Anglo-Egyptian War and was mentioned in despatches in 1883. He transferred to the battleship HMS Minotaur in the Channel Squadron in September 1883.

Promoted to lieutenant on 27 July 1884, Madden transferred to the troopship HMS Assistance in November 1884 and then attended the torpedo school HMS Vernon before joining the directing staff there in 1885. He became torpedo officer in the frigate HMS Raleigh on the Cape of Good Hope Station in March 1888 and then in the battleship HMS Royal Sovereign, flagship of the Channel Squadron in 1892 before rejoining the staff of HMS Vernon in 1893. Promoted to commander on 30 June 1896, he was posted to the cruiser HMS Terrible in the Mediterranean Fleet and then the battleship HMS Caesar also in the Mediterranean Fleet before returning to HMS Vernon again in 1899. Promoted to captain on 30 June 1901, he was in February 1902 appointed to HMS Renown, flagship of the Mediterranean Fleet, as an additional officer for duty with torpedo boat destroyers in the Mediterranean. From April 1902, this included command of the ironclad HMS Orion, depot-ship at Malta for torpedo boats. In September that year, he was posted to the armoured cruiser HMS Good Hope, and was the first captain to commission her as she was completed in November that year. Her first assignment was to convey Joseph Chamberlain, Secretary of State for the Colonies, on his tour of South Africa from December 1902 to March 1903. She then served as flagship of Admiral Wilmot Fawkes, commanding the cruiser squadron on the North America and West Indies Station, to whom Madden thus served as flag captain. Appointed a Lieutenant of the Royal Victorian Order on 11 August 1903, he joined the Ship Design Committee, which produced the Dreadnought and Invincible-class designs for battleships and armoured battlecruisers, in December 1904 and then became naval assistant to Admiral Henry Jackson, Third Sea Lord and Controller of the Navy in February 1905. He became Naval Assistant to the First Sea Lord in December 1905 and was advanced to Commander of the Royal Victorian Order on 3 August 1907.

Madden returned to sea as commanding officer of the battleship HMS Dreadnought and chief of staff to Sir Francis Bridgeman, commander-in-chief of the Home Fleet in August 1907. He became Private Naval Secretary to Reginald McKenna, First Lord of the Admiralty, in December 1908 and, having been appointed a naval aide-de-camp to the King on 4 January 1910, he went on to be Fourth Sea Lord in January 1910 and took part in the funeral of King Edward VII in May 1910. Promoted to rear admiral on 12 April 1911, he was given command of the first division of the Home Fleet during 1912, the 3rd cruiser squadron during 1913, and then the 2nd cruiser squadron during 1914.

== First World War ==
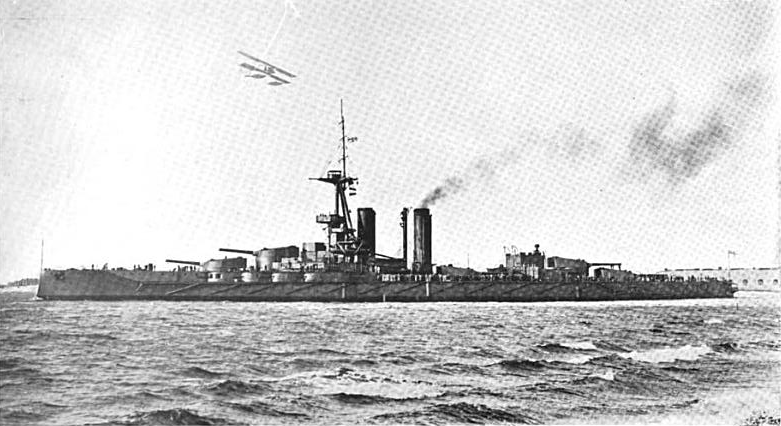
The battleship HMS Iron Duke, in which Madden saw action as Chief of Staff to the Commander-in-Chief of the Grand Fleet at the Battle of Jutland

When Admiral Sir John Jellicoe was appointed to take over the command of the Grand Fleet at the start of the First World War, he asked for his wife's brother-in-law, Madden, who had been designated to rejoin the Board of Admiralty as Third Sea Lord, to accompany him as chief of staff. Madden was accordingly sent to join Jellicoe in the dreadnought HMS Iron Duke, Jellicoe's flagship, in August 1914 and, having been promoted to acting vice admiral in June 1915 and appointed a Knight Commander of the Order of the Bath in the 1916 New Year Honours, he took part in the Battle of Jutland in May 1916. He was appointed a Knight Commander of the Order of St Michael and St George on 31 May 1916 for his services at Jutland and confirmed in the rank of vice-admiral on 9 June 1916. He was also appointed a commander of the French Legion of Honour on 15 September 1916.

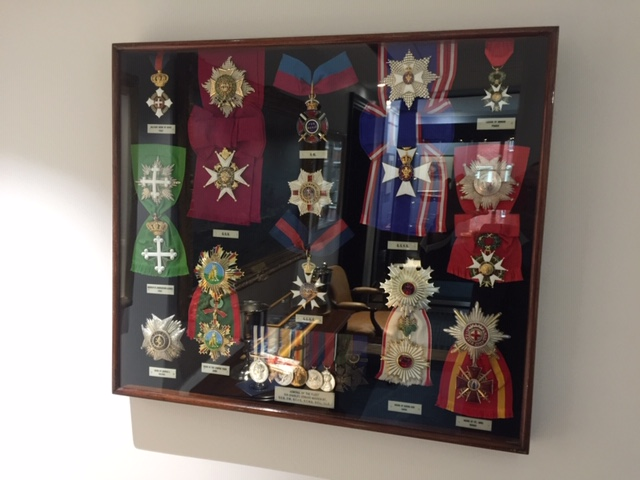
Sir Charles Madden's medals on display at Cayzer House

Madden was given command of the 1st Battle Squadron, as second in command of the Grand Fleet with his flag in the battleship HMS Marlborough in December 1916 later transferring his flag to the battleship HMS Revenge. He was awarded the Russian Order of St. Anna 1st class (with swords) on 5 June 1917, given the Japanese Grand Cordon of the Order of the Rising Sun on 29 August 1917 and appointed a Grand Officer of the Belgian Order of Leopold on 29 November 1918 as well as being awarded the French Croix de Guerre on 15 February 1919 and the Chinese Order of the Striped Tiger on 22 January 1920. He was also advanced to Knight Grand Cross of the Order of the Bath on 1 January 1919 and promoted to full admiral on 19 February 1919.

== Post war ==
When Admiral Sir David Beatty hauled down his flag as commander-in-chief of the Grand Fleet in 1919 and the war organization of the navy was broken up, Madden was appointed to the command of the newly constituted Atlantic Fleet with his flag in the battleship HMS Queen Elizabeth. He was created a baronet on 29 December 1919 and advanced to Knight Grand Cross of the Royal Victorian Order on 23 July 1920. Madden was appointed First and Principal Naval Aide-de-Camp to the King on 15 August 1922 and was promoted to Admiral of the Fleet on 31 July 1924. He served as chairman of the committee on the functions and training of Royal Marines in 1924, and took part in a committee under the chairmanship of Lord Chelmsford on the list of executive officers of the navy in 1925. He was appointed First Sea Lord in July 1927 and, in that role, in order to avoid an arms race, he accepted parity with the United States in the form of 50 cruisers defending his position on the basis that he only actually had 48 cruisers anyway. He retired in July 1930 and died at 29 Wimpole Street in London on 5 June 1935.

== Family ==
On 28 June 1905 Madden married Constance Winifred, third and youngest daughter of Sir Charles Cayzer, 1st Baronet, and sister of Countess Jellicoe; and they had two sons (Charles and John) and four daughters (Conn, Joan, Hope and Mary).

== Arms ==
Coat of arms of Sir Charles Madden, 1st Baronet

Notes
Granted 30 October 1919 by George James Burtchaell, Deputy Ulster King of Arms.
Crest
Out of a ducal coronet Gules a falcon rising Or holding in his beak a cross crosslet fitchée of the first.
Escutcheon
Quarterly 1st Sable a falcon with his wings expanded seizing on a mallard Argent beaked and membered Or on a chief of the last a cross botonnée Gules (Madden) 2nd Or a pile engrailed Sable (Waterhouse) 3rd Sable a chevron between in chief two escallops and in base a boar's head couped Argent (Travers) 4th Sable a saltire Argent (Duckett).
Motto
Fortior Qui Se Vincit

== Sources ==
- Heathcote, Tony (2002). The British Admirals of the Fleet 1734 – 1995. Pen & Sword Ltd. ISBN 0-85052-835-6.
- Mandeles, Mark David (2007). Military Transformation Past and Present: Historic Lessons for the 21st Century. Praeger Publishers Inc. ISBN 978-0275991906.

Military offices
Preceded by Hugh Evan-Thomas	Private Secretary to the First Lord of the Admiralty; 1908–1910	Succeeded by Ernest Troubridge
Preceded by Sir Alfred Winsloe	Fourth Sea Lord; 1910–1911	Succeeded by Sir William Pakenham
New post	Commander-in-Chief, Atlantic Fleet; 1919–1922	Succeeded by Sir John de Robeck
Preceded by The Earl Beatty	First Sea Lord; 1927–1930	Succeeded by Sir Frederick Field
Honorary titles
Preceded by Sir Stanley Colville	First and Principal Naval Aide-de-Camp; 1922–1924	Succeeded by Sir Somerset Gough-Calthorpe
Baronetage of the United Kingdom
New creation	Baronet (of Kells); 1919–1935	Succeeded by Charles Madden
